= Parkes Elvis Festival =

Celebration of Elvis Presley in New South Wales, Australia

Coordinates: 33°08′23.20″S 148°10′29.00″E

- Frequency: Annual
- Location: Parkes, New South Wales
- Years active: 33
- Inaugurated: 1992
- Most recent: 2025
- Participants: Elvis Presley impersonators
- Website: parkeselvisfestival.com.au

The Parkes Elvis Festival is an Australian annual event celebrating the music and the legend of Elvis Presley held on the second weekend in January in the New South Wales regional town of Parkes. The first festival in 1992 was a one-night performance attracting 300 attendees. From then, it has grown to become a five-day-long festival. The festival now includes more than 200 events and continues to attract more than 25,000 people to Parkes annually.

== History ==
=== First event ===
The first Parkes Elvis Festival, held in 1992, was a one-night event attracting 200 people. It was held at Graceland Restaurant to commemorate Presley's birthday. Over the next few years more events were added and the festival was extended to two days with a few hundred people attending.

=== 2005 ===
By January 2005, the attendance had increased to 3,500 people.

=== 2006 ===
In January 2006, there was a 40 per cent increase with around 5,000 attending the festival and it injected an estimated $8 million into the Parkes economy.

=== 2007 ===
The 2007 festival had over 60 events and was held over five days. More than 6,000 visitors were estimated to have attended. A new world record was set for the most Elvis impersonators in one location. SBS Independent commissioned a half-hour documentary on the festival, Elvis Lives in Parkes, which was first aired on Australian television on 10 January 2007.

=== 2008 ===
Featuring over 80 events, the 2008 Festival attracted in excess of 8,000 people.

=== 2009 ===
The 2009 festival became the biggest ever with a huge crowd of 9,500 enjoying the Elvis festivities. The King's Castle, a collection of genuine Elvis memorabilia, was introduced in 2009 adding a new dimension to the festival. The collection is now open year-round.

=== 2010 ===
The festival attracted record crowds again with 12,000 people enjoying over 140 events across 5 days.

=== 2011 ===
The 2011 festival attracted 15,000 people. There were over 150 events across the 5 days. The Kings Castle, a collection of genuine Elvis memorabilia in Parkes, moved to a new and improved complex allowing more visitors to see the collection.

=== 2012 ===
The 2012 festival started on 11 January 2012. It features a guest appearance by Australian singer Kamahl.

=== 2016 ===
US Elvis tribute artist Donny Edwards was the headliner and he was told it was the first time in the festival's history that all four shows had been sold out.

=== 2017 ===
The 2017 festival ran from 11 to 15 January. It was the 25th festival. The theme was Viva Las Vegas. The Elvis tribute artists for the four feature concerts held at the Parkes Leagues Club were Pete Storm and Jake Rowley.

=== 2018 ===
The 2018 festival ran from 10 to 14 January. It was the 26th festival and celebrated 50 years since the "'68 Comeback" theme. More than 26,500 people enjoyed an array of events including international Elvis tribute artist Ben Thompson.

=== 2019 ===
On 23 January 2019 it was reported by Free Malaysia Today as well as the Parkes Champion Post that some $13 million had impacted on the economy of Parkes, as more than 27,000 people visited to attend some 200 Elvis-themed events, with the New South Wales state government projecting an injection of $43 million into the wider region surrounding Parkes in 2019 due to the festival's success.

=== 2022 ===
With 2021's cancellation due to the COVID-19 pandemic, the festival went on hiatus until April 2022. The Parkes Elvis Festival entered its 29th year and attracted close to 25,000 to the town some 222 miles west of Sydney.

== Sponsors ==
Parkes Elvis Festival sponsors include Destination NSW, Australian Rail Track Corporation, Parkes Shire Council and Northparkes, along with many more contributing partners and supporters.

== Transport ==
Since 2004, CountryLink and its successor NSW TrainLink have operated a special XPT train service from Sydney to Parkes.
