= Mickibri =

- Suburb
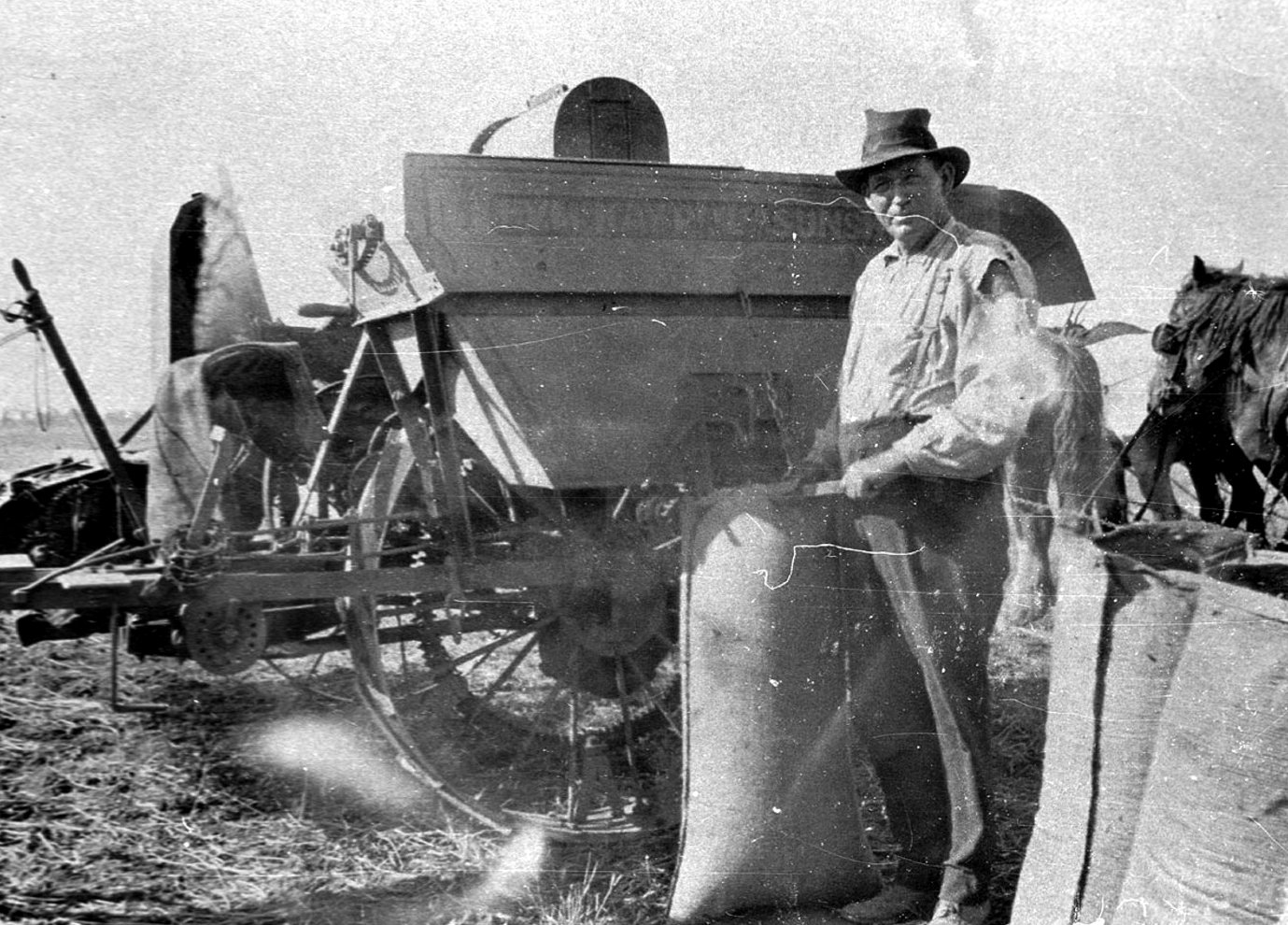
- Mickibri Harvest (1924)

- Coordinates: 32°52′54″S 148°11′04″E
- Country: Australia
- State: New South Wales
- LGA: Parkes Shire
- Location: 382 km (237 mi) WNW of Sydney; 97 km (60 mi) SW of Dubbo; 24 km (15 mi) N of Parkes

Government
  - State electorate: Orange
  - Federal division: Calare

Population
  - Total: 201 (2006 census)
- Postcode: 2870

Mickibri is a bounded rural locality in Parkes Shire in the Central West region of New South Wales located at Latitude-32.858 and Longitude148.198. It is also a station on the Parkes–Narromine railway line west of Alectown, New South Wales.

The Postcode for Mickibri, New South Wales is 2870 and its 301km from Sydney, Australia.

Prior to European colonisation, the Mickibri area was inhabited by the Wiradjuri people, but it opened up in the 1880s Gold Rush. Today the area is agricultural in nature with nearby Parkes as the nearest service centre. The Harvey ranges are 14km away.
