= Parish of Houston =

Houston
- Cadastral division
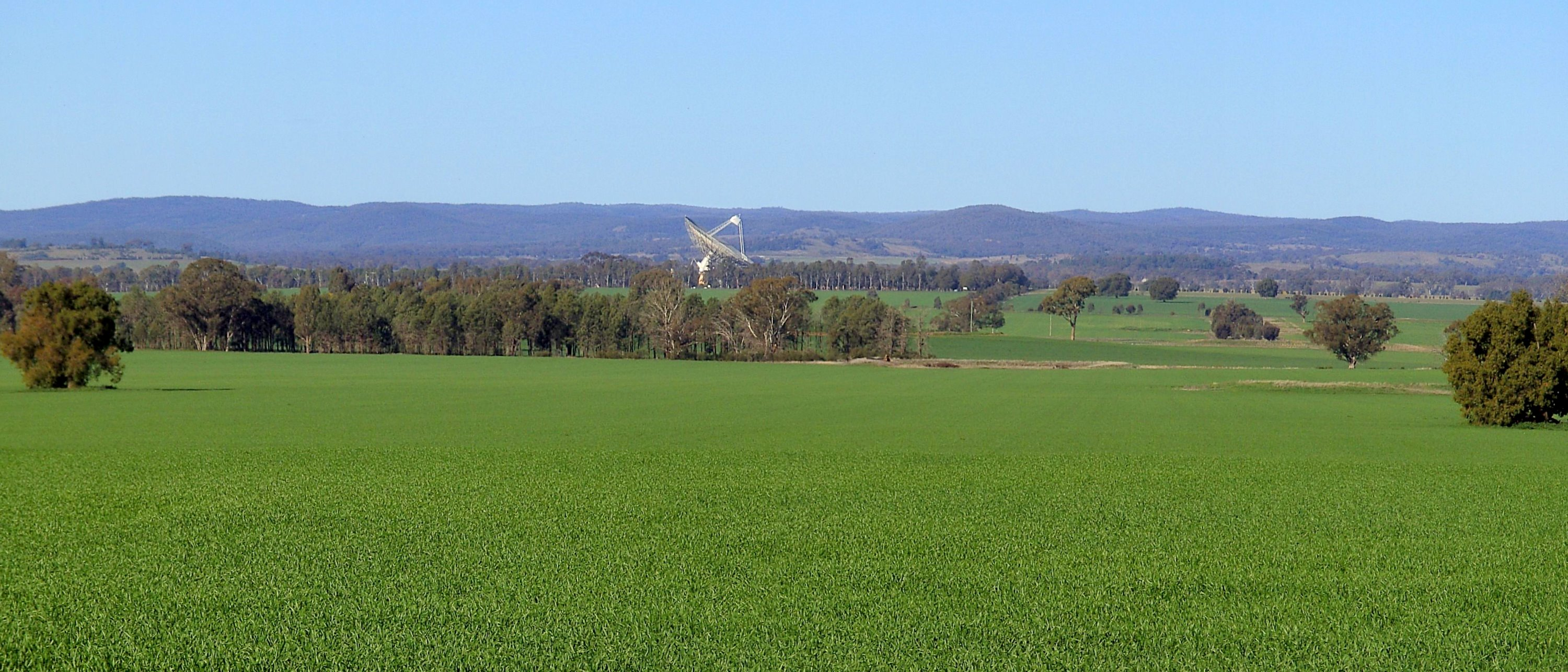
- Houston parish, Alectown

- Coordinates: 32°56′54″S 148°18′04″E
- Country: Australia
- State: New South Wales
- LGA: Parkes Shire
- Location: 382 km (237 mi) WNW of Sydney; 97 km (60 mi) SW of Dubbo; 24 km (15 mi) N of Parkes

Government
  - State electorate: Dubbo
  - Federal division: Calare
- Postcode: 2870
- County: Kennedy County

Houston Parish is a cadastral parish in Parkes Shire and Kennedy County, central New South Wales. It lies on the southern boundary of Alectown township, and its most prominent landmark is the Parkes radio telescope. Houson Parish, New South Wales is about 300 km (186 mi) west-northwest of New South Wales's capital city of Sydney, and is on the Goobang Creek.

Prior to European settlement, the Houston/Mcphail areas was inhabited by the Wiradjuri people. Major Thomas Mitchell and John Oxley were early explorers in the area. The area was first opened up in the 19th century gold rush of western New South Wales, with both companies and artisan mining striking rich veins at Mcphaile for about 20 years. A village soon sprung up but no evidence of the village remains today, and the main economic activity is wheat and sheep.
