= The Peak Hill Express =

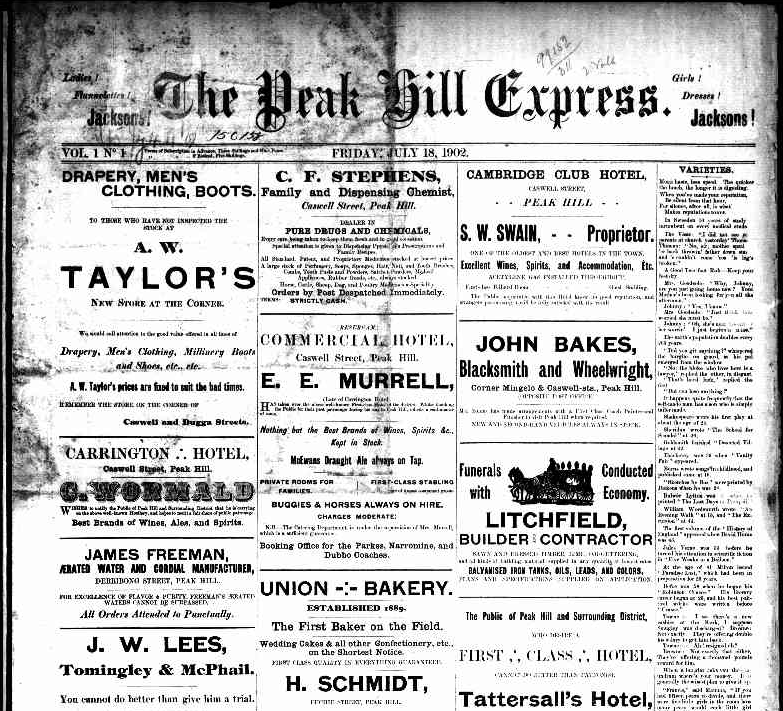
First page of first edition, 18 July 1902

The Peak Hill Express was a weekly English language newspaper published in Peak Hill, New South Wales, Australia.

== History ==
The newspaper began publication on 18 July 1902 and ceased publication on 29 June 1956. Publishers of the newspaper included A. Miles, Robert James Baker, John McIntyre, Rural Newspapers Ltd. and McLong Peak Hill Printing Co. Ltd.

== Digitisation ==
The paper has been digitised as part of the Australian Newspapers Digitisation Program project of the National Library of Australia.

== See also ==
- List of newspapers in Australia
- List of newspapers in New South Wales
