= Peake station =

Peake station, or Peake railway station, may refer to:

- Peake railway station, County Cork, a former railway station on the Cork and Muskerry Light Railway in County Cork, Ireland
- Peake railway station, South Australia, a former railway station on the Pinnaroo railway line in South Australia, Australia

== See also ==
- Peak station (disambiguation)
