= William Yeo =

Sir William Yeo CBE (1 May 1896 – 9 December 1972) was an Australian ex-service leader, farmer and soldier.

== Early life ==
Yeo was born in Alectown, New South Wales, the son of Australian-born schoolteacher Arthur Plane Yeo and his wife Louisa Mary (née Curry). He attended Peak Hill Public School and was enlisted in the First Australian Imperial Force (1st AIF) on 7 March 1915. Posted to the 18th Battalion, he was stationed in Gallipoli, France, and Belgium.

== Career ==
In 1916, after being diagnosed with posttraumatic stress disorder, Yeo was sent to England to recover for some three months. He returned to service in 1917 and was deployed as a battalion bandsman, returning to Australia in March 1919. On 26 July 1919, Yeo was discharged from the army, following which he bought a farm in Peak Hill. The same year, he became a member of the Returned Sailors' and Soldiers' Imperial League of Australia (the predecessor of the Returned Servicemen's League of Australia), and was elected as the honorary secretary of its office in Peak Hill. In 1928, Yeo was appointed as a delegate to the league's yearly congress in New South Wales. On 6 March 1925, he married schoolteacher Eileen Theresa Golding in Hurstville, Sydney. They had no children. In 1949, Yeo was elected as the league's state president and would serve in the position for two decades. He spent much of his time as president in Sydney. A self-declared nationalist, Yeo supported the White Australia policy and was critical of Japan. He also considered himself an anti-Communist and supported more military aggression in Korea, Malaya, and Vietnam.

== Later years ==
Yeo was appointed a Commander of the Most Excellent Order of the British Empire (CBE) in 1954. In 1964, he was knighted by Queen Elizabeth II. Prone to gaffes and a polarising figure in the league, Yeo was ousted as state president in 1969 by schoolteacher F. S. Maher. Yeo assumed the official title of past president and died on 9 December 1972 at Concord Repatriation General Hospital, and was eulogised as a person who "did what he solemnly believed to be in the interest of every ex-serviceman and woman".
