= Parkes Spacemen =

Australian rugby league club, based in Parkes NSW

Parkes
Club information
- Full name: Parkes Rugby League Football Club
- Nickname: Spacemen
- Colours: Red; White; Dark Blue

Current details
- Ground: Pioneer Oval, Parkes
- Competition: Western Premiership

Records
- Premierships: 10 (1954, 1972, 1973, 1983, 1984, 1988, 1995, 1996, 2010, 2013)

The Parkes Rugby League Football Club (nicknamed the Spacemen) is a rugby league club that has played in the Western Premiership since 2022, when that competition was formed by an amalgamation of Group 11, where Parkes used to play, and Group 10. The Spacemen gained media attention when they recruited a number of Fiji national rugby league team players prior to the 2008 Rugby League World Cup.

== Nickname ==
Parkes is a regional town of nearly ten thousand people located near the middle of New South Wales, with its economy based on farming and mining. It is also the location of the Parkes Observatory Radio Telescope, from which the Spacemen took their nickname. The name was also recognised during the 100 year celebrations of rugby league by being listed in the article 100 Reasons Why People Love Rugby League, which appeared in the Sydney Morning Herald.

== Media attention ==
The Spacemen were simply a struggling regional club before circumstances brought media attention. The Spacemen advertised for players; at the same time, Fijian rugby league players sought to join a New South Wales club in preparation for the 2008 Rugby League World Cup. These Fiji national rugby league team players included Alipate Noilea, Semisi Tora and Ilisoni Vonomateiratu.

Local media closely followed the 2008 Rugby League World Cup progress of the Fijian National team and its Spacemen, culminating in their defeat by Australia in the second semi-final. By this time national and international media had picked up the story.

== Notable Juniors ==
- Billy Burns (2019-21 Penrith Panthers) (2021- St George Illawarra Dragons)
- Darby Medlyn (2020- Canberra Raiders)
- Ben Lovett (rugby league) (2021- South Sydney Rabbitohs)
