= Ben Lovett (rugby league) =

Australian rugby league footballer

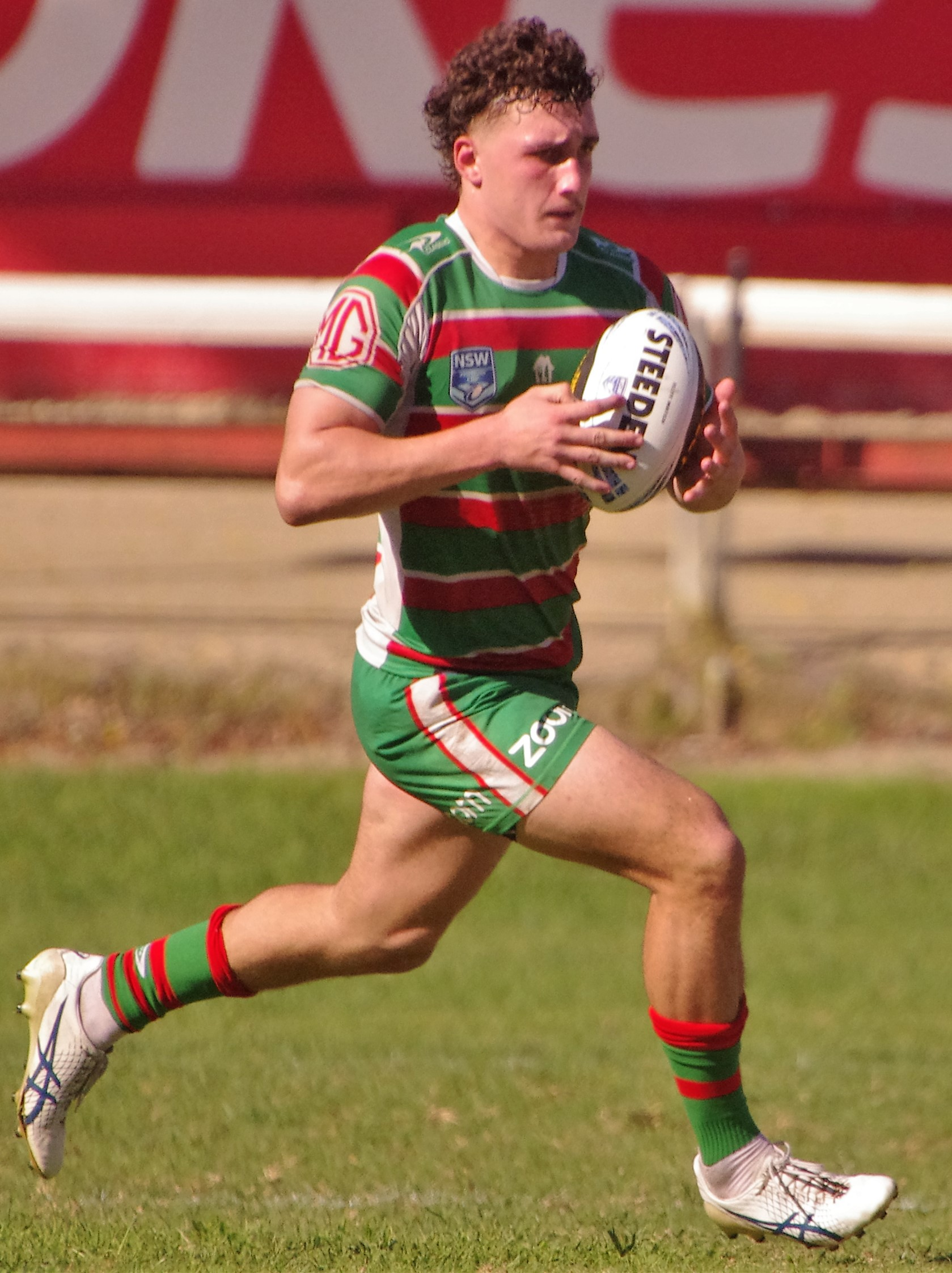

Personal information
- Full name: Benjamin Lovett
- Born: 7 December 2001 (age 24) Penrith, New South Wales, Australia
- Height: 188 cm (6 ft 2 in)
- Weight: 103 kg (16 st 3 lb)

Playing information
- Position: Second-row
Club
Years	Team	Pld	T	G	FG	P
2023	South Sydney	3	0	0	0	0
- Relatives: Kurt Lovett (brother)

Benjamin Lovett (born 7 December 2001) is a retired Australian professional rugby league footballer who last played as a second-row forward for the South Sydney Rabbitohs in the NRL.

== Early life ==
Lovett was raised in Parkes, New South Wales, was a Parkes Spacemen junior and represented the NSW Combined Catholic Colleges in 2019.

== Playing career ==
In 2022, Lovett joined the South Sydney club. He made his first grade debut from the bench in his side's 13−12 victory over the Manly Warringah Sea Eagles at Stadium Australia in round 4 of the 2023 NRL season. On 24 September 2023, he played for South Sydney in their 2023 NSW Cup grand final victory over North Sydney.

=== 2025 ===
On 10 September 2025, Lovett announced his retirement from the NRL aged only 23 due to an ongoing knee injury, Lovett will return to the club in an official capacity behind the scenes.

== Post playing ==
After retiring from the NRL, Lovett took up a role as an assistant coach for the Rabbitohs Jersey Flegg Squad.
