= Parkes Post Office =

Parkes Post Office (former)
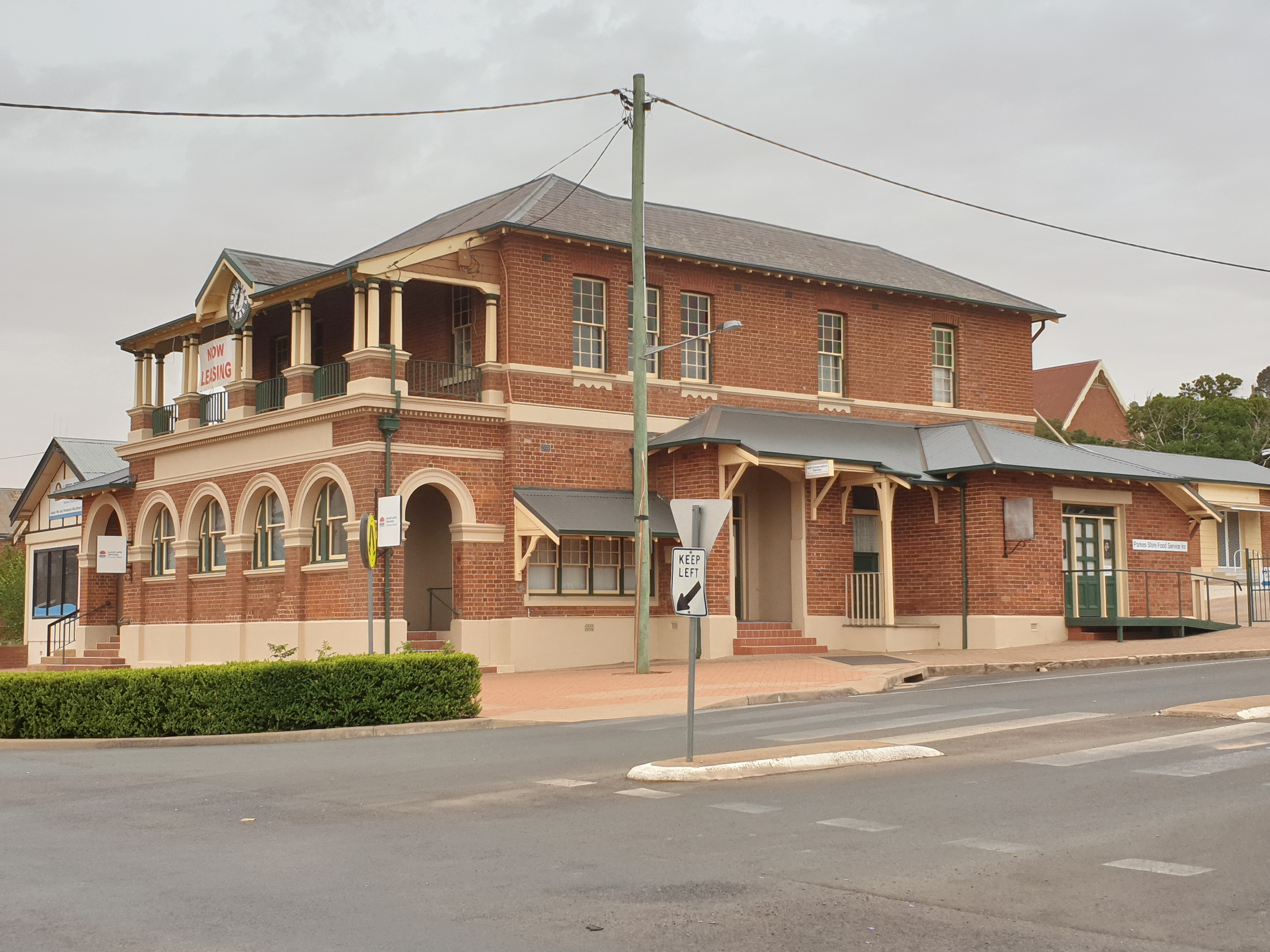

- Location within New South Wales Location within Australia
- 33°08′11″S 148°10′36″E
- Location: 39 Currajong Street, Parkes, Parkes Shire, New South Wales, Australia

History
- Built: 1880

Site notes
- Architects: James Barnet; Walter Liberty Vernon (alteration)

New South Wales Heritage Register
- Official name: Parkes Post Office
- Type: State heritage (built)
- Designated: 2 April 1999
- Reference no.: 717
- Type: Post Office
- Category: Postal and Telecommunications

The Parkes Post Office is a heritage-listed former post office and now offices at 39 Currajong Street, Parkes, Parkes Shire, New South Wales, Australia. It was designed by James Barnet and Walter Liberty Vernon and built during 1880. The property is privately owned. It was added to the New South Wales State Heritage Register on 2 April 1999.

== History ==
Constructed in 1880 and designed by Colonial Architect, James Barnet. Major alterations were completed by his successor, Colonial Architect Walter Liberty Vernon that altered its appearance and further minor alterations were made in 1901–1903. The Post Office is one of an important group of buildings, including the Courthouse, Police Station and churches, which make up the civic heart of Parkes.

The building was one of the first "grand" buildings erected in Parkes and a hub of activity. During its lifetime the building has evolved – catering to the needs of the community. Modifications over time are symbolic of the growth of Parkes – from a pioneering miners' settlement to a contemporary centre in the Central West. For just over 100 years (from 1880–1989) the building was continuously used as a postal and telecommunications facility and an integral part of the Parkes community.

On 28 April 1989 the Parkes Shire Council wrote to the Heritage Council requesting that it give consideration to placing a Permanent Conservation Order over Parkes Post Office as Australia Post was constructing a new premises which would render the Post Office obsolete. Australia Post advised that it would make prospective buyers aware of the possibility of the Heritage Council making a Permanent Conservation Order.

The site ceased operating as a post office in 1990 following the opening of a new facility in Welcome Street. To protect the original post office it was heritage listed and has been used since as offices.

On 6 February 1990 a Permanent Conservation Order was placed over the Post Office. It was transferred to the State Heritage Register on 2 April 1999.

The current owners Peter and Maddalena Sgarlata bought the post office in 1990 and have carried out major works including re-slating the roof, a mammoth taks. A facelift to the exterior of the building has recently been completed, with the assistance of the Heritage Council of NSW, Parkes Shire Council, heritage advisers and contractors. Future works will include a disability access ramp, designed to complement the building, lighting of the upstairs balcony, spot-lighting, repairing the clock and minor paint work.

=== Modifications and dates ===
10 December 1999: Heritage Council approval for internal partitions and external signage.

== Heritage listing ==
As at 13 September 2005, Parkes Post Office is considered to be an item of the State's environmental heritage for its historical value and association with the development of Parkes. For its landmark value and its contribution to the streetscape. For its architectural value as an example of the work of the Colonial Architect and the Government Architect.

The Parkes Post Office was listed on the New South Wales State Heritage Register on 2 April 1999.

== Gallery ==
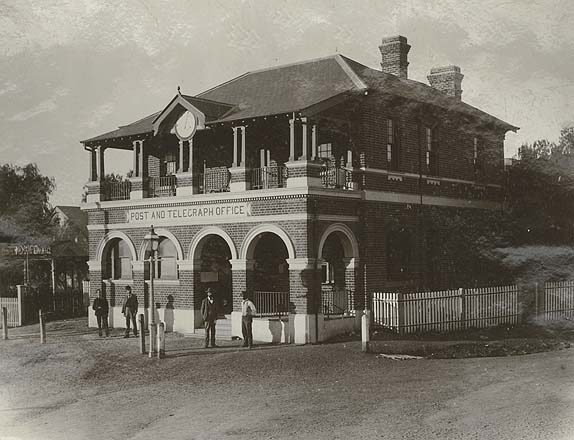
Undated photograph
