= Mike Leary =

Australian rugby league footballer

Personal information
- Full name: Michael Arthur Leary
- Born: 3 April 1944 (age 81); Parkes, New South Wales, Australia

Playing information
- Position: Fullback
Club
Years	Team	Pld	T	G	FG	P
1968–72	Penrith Panthers	92	13	0	2	43
1973	Parramatta Eels	21	1	0	0	3
	Total	113	14	0	2	46

Mike Leary (born 3 April 1944) is an Australian former professional rugby league footballer and executive. He played for the Penrith Panthers and Parramatta Eels in the NSWRFL between 1968 and 1973.

Leary is a native of Parkes, New South Wales and was a Country Firsts representative in 1967, prior to arriving at Penrith. A fullback, Leary was a three-time Penrith player of the year and later served the Panthers in various administrative roles. From 2008 to 2011 he was the club's Chief Executive Officer.
