= Peak Hill District Hospital =

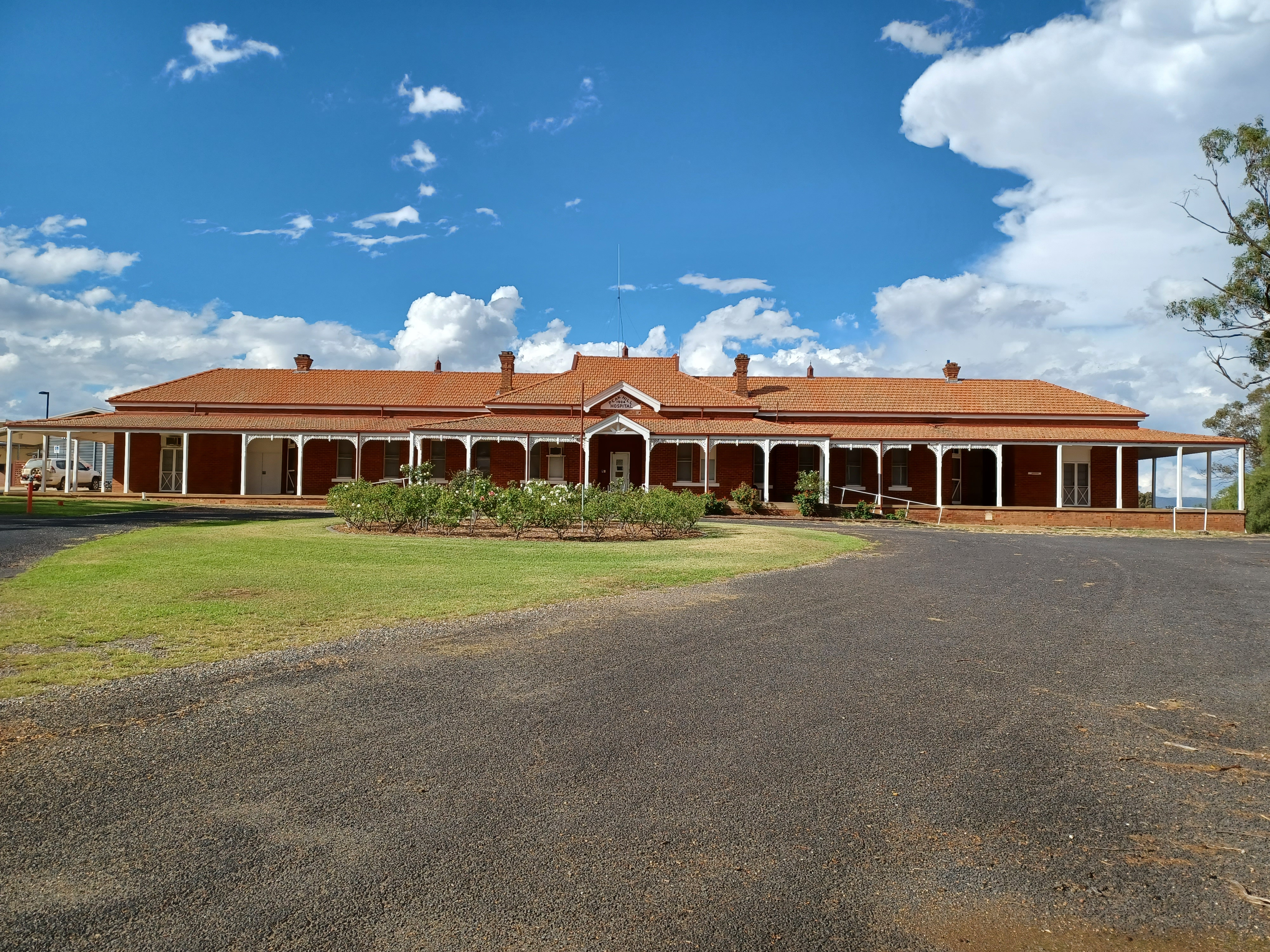
- Heritage Listed Peak Hill District Hospital

- Location in New South Wales

Geography
- Location: Peak Hill, Peak Hill, New South Wales, Australia
- Coordinates: 32.7356004°S 148.1995959°E

Links
- Lists: Hospitals in Australia

The Peak Hill District Hospital is a former public hospital building located at Peak Hill, New South Wales in Australia.

The hospital occupies a 4-hectare plot of land, strategically located on an elevated position that overlooks the Newell Highway. The architectural style of the building reflects the prevalent designs of the late Victorian era, characterized by its distinct features. The structure itself is primarily constructed using red bricks, lending it a charming and timeless appeal. Complementing the brickwork, the roof is adorned with vibrant red terra cotta tiles, further enhancing the overall aesthetics of the building.

In 2012 the Victorian style building was listed on the New South Wales State Heritage Register. The Peak Hill Multi Purpose Service is a new building providing Healthcare to the Peak Hill district and is located at the rear of the older hospital building.

== History ==
The construction of the hospital building began in 1904 as a replacement for the original structure built in 1891. It opened its doors to the public on 9 November 1904, serving as a vital healthcare facility for the community.

The following description was published in the Peak Hill Newspaper " The Peak Hill Hospital is built of brick, with lofty cavity walls, and covered with a tiled roof. A wide hall or vestibule forms the entrance, off which are the medical officer's room on one side, and the matron's sitting room on the other. A passage 5ft wide runs at right angles to the vestibule, leading to the mouth of the male and female wards, which are at either end of the building, but shut off by screen doors to keep the wards quite private. Off this passage are the dispensary, matron, and nurses' bedrooms, medical storeroom, and nurses' dayroom. A short, wide passage leads from the mouth of each ward, giving easy egress to the operating room, which will form a later addition. There is accommodation for sixteen patients —ten males and six females; and each ward has its own bathroom, and complete lavatory, in an annexe leading off the wards, with a ventilated passage between. Ten feet verandahs go round the building, the whole forming a complete, up-to-date hospital on a small scale, with excellent ventilation. No woodwork has been used in any part of the building, excepting the actual sashes and doors. A complete domestic block, consisting of large kitchen and dining-room for the staff, and the usual offices has also been erected."

In 1938 at a cost of £4741, additional male and female intermediate wards were added to the main building, creating separate sections for each gender. Over the years, several outbuildings were also erected at the rear of the hospital to accommodate various needs and services.

In 2013, the decision was made to close the hospital, prompting the construction of a new facility at the rear of the site. As part of this development, certain buildings with little heritage significance were demolished to make way for the modern hospital infrastructure. However, the original Victorian-style Peak Hill Hospital building, recognized for its architectural and historical value, has since been designated as a heritage-listed site.

During its construction, the bricks used in the building were locally produced by Bromley's brickworks, contributing to the regional character of the structure. Additionally, the timbers utilized in the construction were carefully selected from the surrounding area, showcasing the use of local resources and emphasizing the connection to the community.

Today, the new hospital stands on the same site, positioned at the rear of the heritage-listed old hospital. This thoughtful placement ensures a continuation of healthcare services while preserving the historical significance of the original building. The old hospital serves as a reminder of the town's medical history and is now protected as a valuable heritage asset.

== Gallery ==
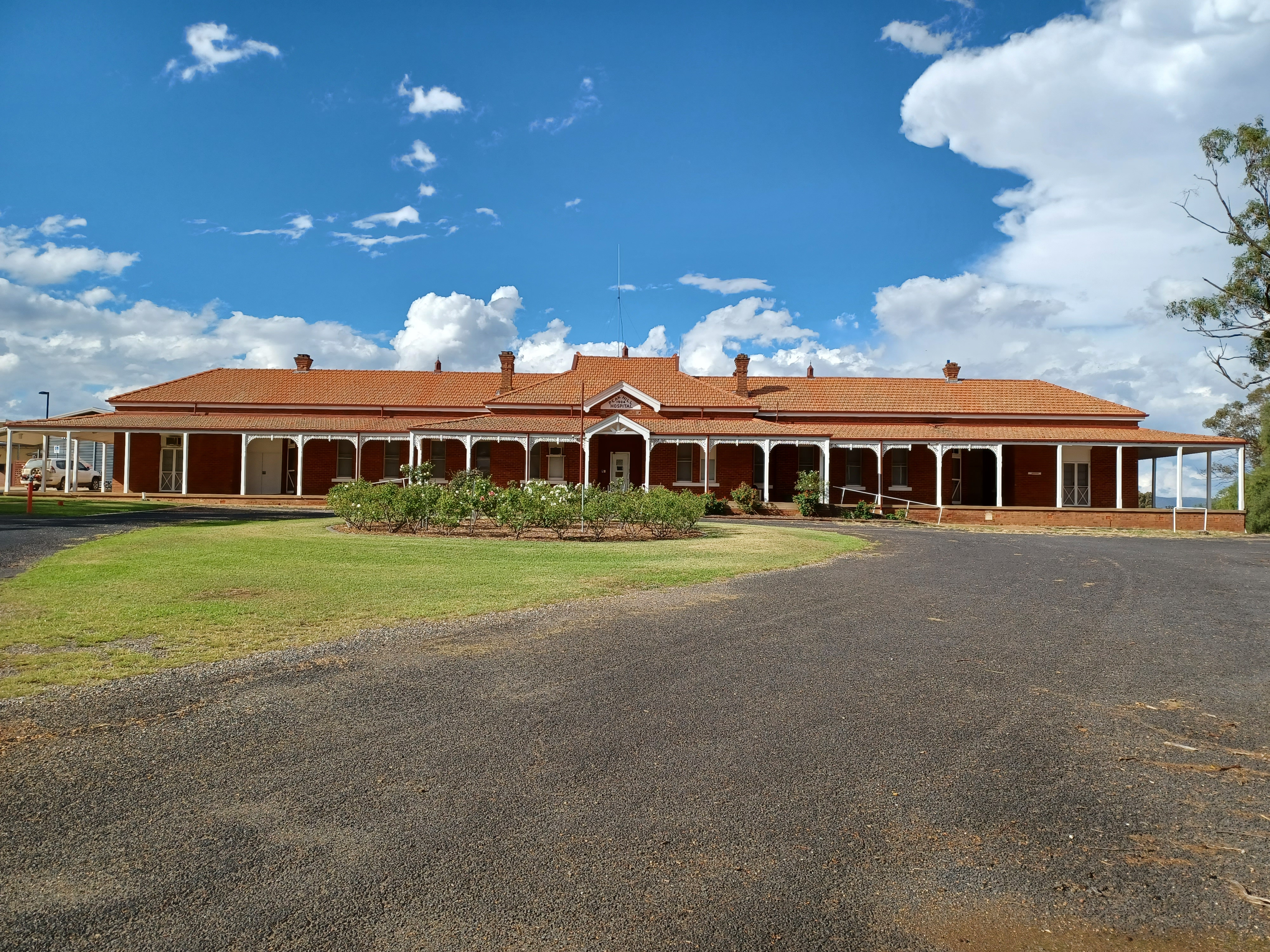

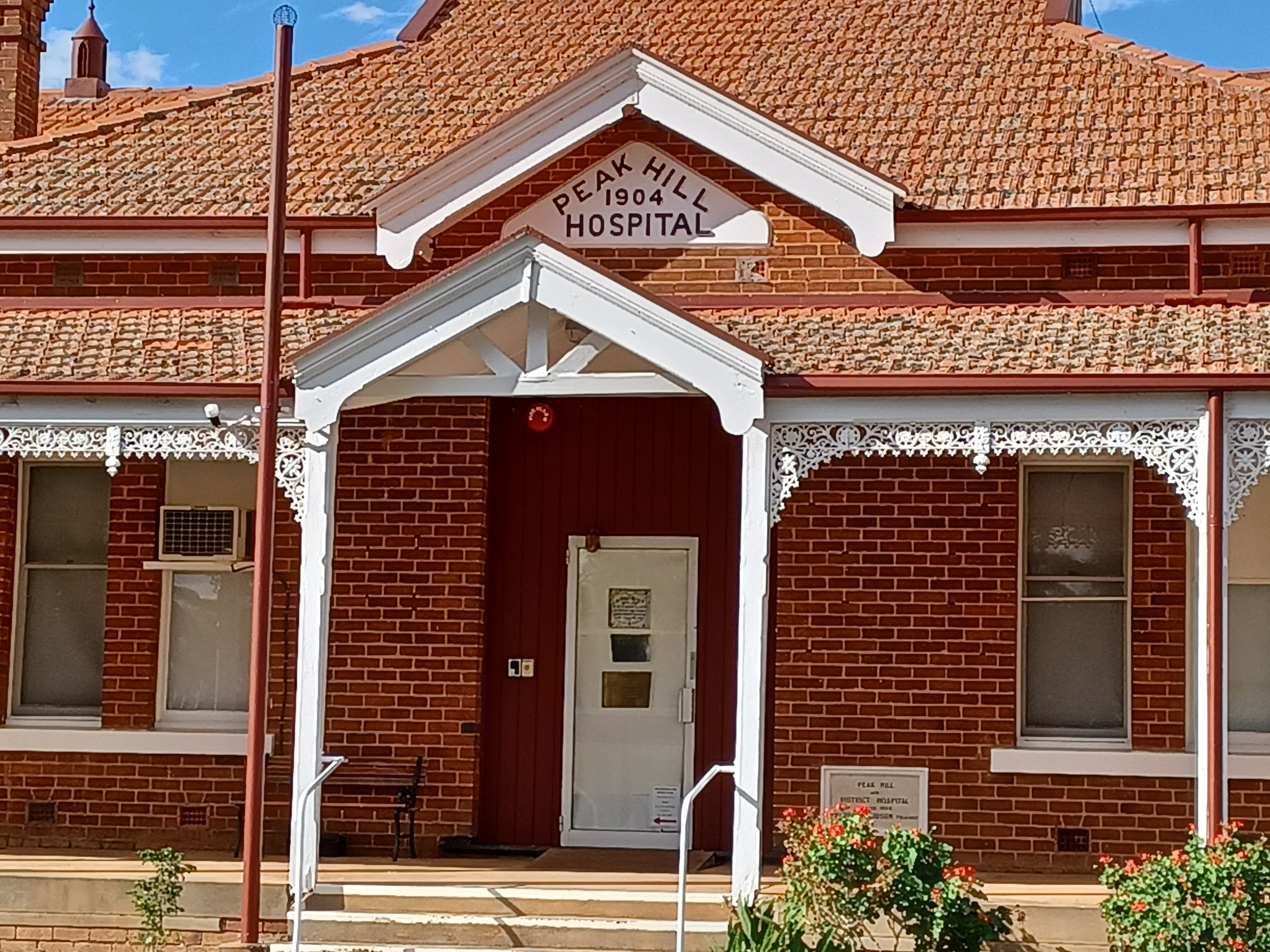

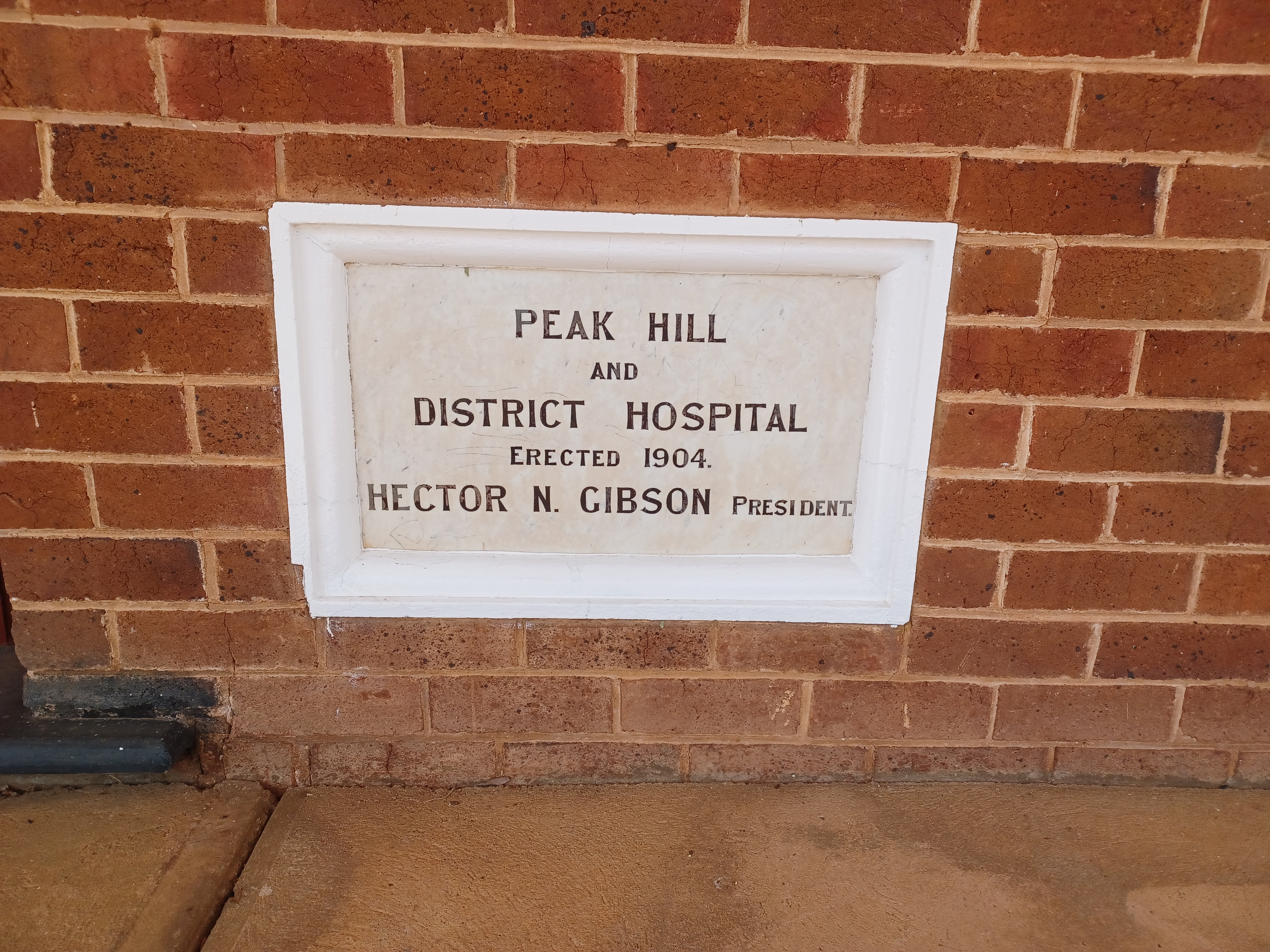
