= Peak station =

Peak station, or Peak railway station, may refer to:

== Railway stations ==
- Peak Forest railway station, a former station on the Midland Railway in the United Kingdom
- Peak Hill railway station, a former station on the Narromine to Peak Hill railway line in New South Wales, Australia
- Phoenix Peak station, a station on the Dalian Metro in Liaoning Province, China
- Ravenscar railway station, a former station on the Scarborough and Whitby Railway in the United Kingdom, originally known as Peak railway station
- The Peak Terminus, the upper station of the Peak Tramway in Hong Kong, China

== Other stations ==
- Antelope Peak Station, a Butterfield Overland Mail station in Arizona, United States
- Castle Peak Power Station, a power station in Hong Kong, China
- Stein's Peak Station, a Butterfield Overland Mail station in New Mexico, United States
- White Peak Station, a property in Western Australia, Australia

== See also ==
- Peake station (disambiguation)
