= Alectown, New South Wales =

Alectown
- Town
- Coordinates: 32°56′0″S 148°14′30″E
- Country: Australia
- State: New South Wales
- LGA: Parkes Shire
- Location: 382 km (237 mi) WNW of Sydney; 97 km (60 mi) SW of Dubbo; 24 km (15 mi) N of Parkes

Government
  - State electorate: Orange
  - Federal division: Parkes

Population
  - Total: 151 (SAL 2021)
- Postcode: 2870

Alectown is a town in the Central West region of New South Wales, Australia. The town is on the Newell Highway and in the Parkes Shire local government area, 382 kilometres (237 mi), west north west of the state capital, Sydney. The name is also applied to the surrounding rural locality, for postal and statistical purposes.

== History ==
Originally known as Alecs Flat, the district was named after the three men who first prospected here - Alexander Cameron, Alexander Patton, and Alexander Whitelaw.

It was originally a gold mining town which once had a population above 1,000. Bachelors Rush Post Office opened on 1 May 1888 and was renamed Alicktown in 1889 and Alectown in 1891. It closed in 1983. The police station closed in 1930. Alectown had a school, from March 1890 until December 1974. Today, only two churches and some residences remain in the town.

Around 7km by road to the west of Alectown, on the Parkes-Narromine railway line. is the former site of Alectown West railway station, which closed in 1974. There is grain storage at the location, but it is no longer used as a train loading point.

== Demographics ==
At the 2016 census, Alectown and the surrounding area had a population of 168. In the 2021 census the population had dropped to 151.

== Notable residents ==
- Scott Westcott

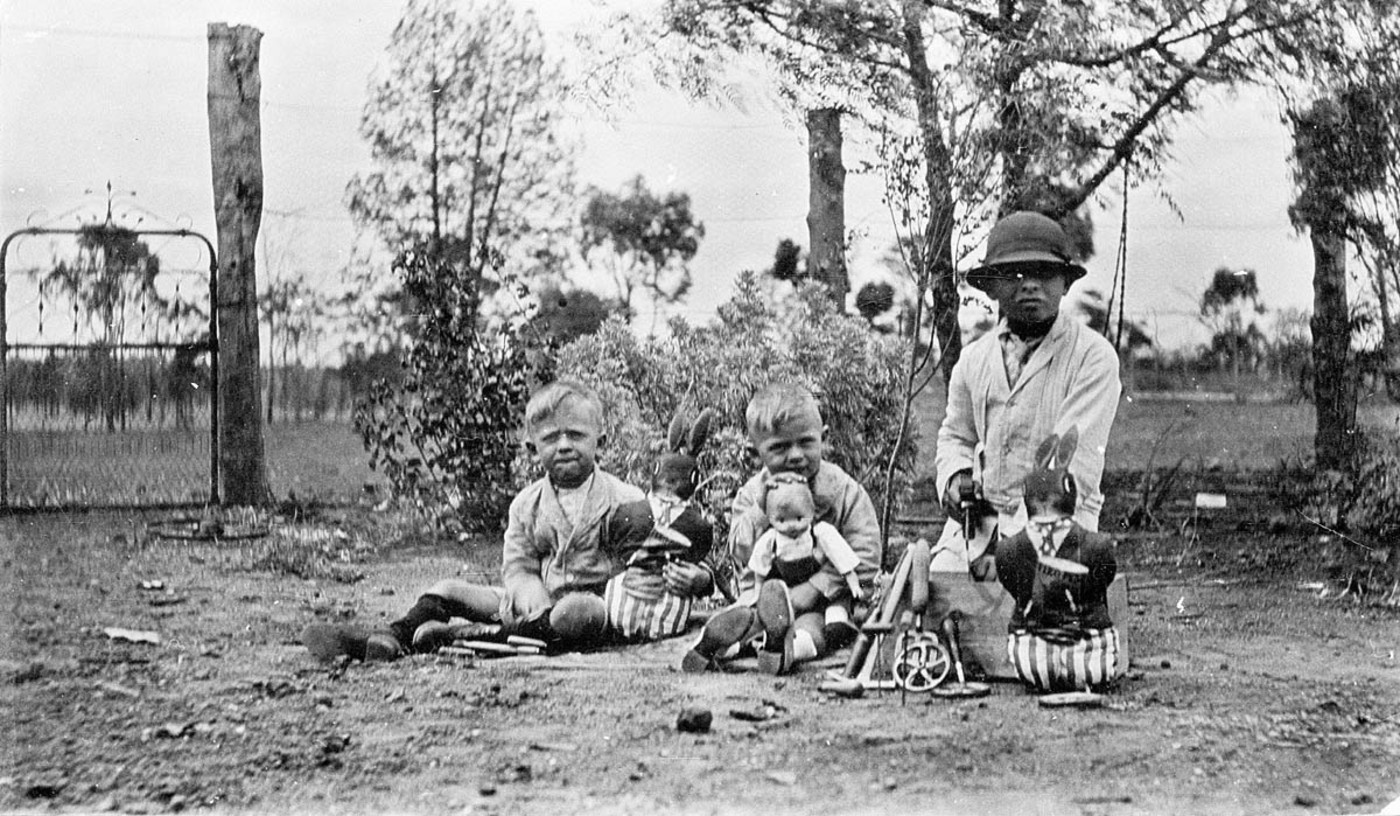
Christmas at Alectown, 1910s, by A B Unger.

== See also ==
- Houston, New South Wales
