= Northparkes =

Mine in Australia

- Location within Australia
- Location: New South Wales, Australia; 32.91052°S 148.03722°E
- Products: Copper (60,000 tonnes); Gold (50,000 ounces)
- Opened: 1994
- Company: Evolution Mining; (80%, 2023–present)

Northparkes is a copper and gold mine in central New South Wales, Australia, approximately 27 kilometres north-northwest of the town of Parkes. The mine was originally started in 1994 using open pit mining, with underground mining using the block caving method starting in 1997.

The mine has an operational capacity to process six million tonnes of ore per year, containing roughly 60,000 tonnes of copper and 50,000 ounces of gold. Economic viability of the mine is projected to extend at least to the year 2032.

Until 2023, the mine was owned by the China Molybdenum Group (CMOC), with the remaining 20% owned by the Sumitomo Group. The mine was previously 80% owned by North Limited, with a takeover by Rio Tinto in 2000, before selling its stake in 2013.

In December 2023, it was announced that Evolution Mining completed the purchase of an 80% controlling interest in the mine for $300 million.

== Technology ==
Northparkes was one of the first mine sites to have automated loaders, and also the first block-cave mine in Australia.
