= Peak Hill railway station =

Former Railway Station at Peak Hill NSW

Peak Hill Railway Station
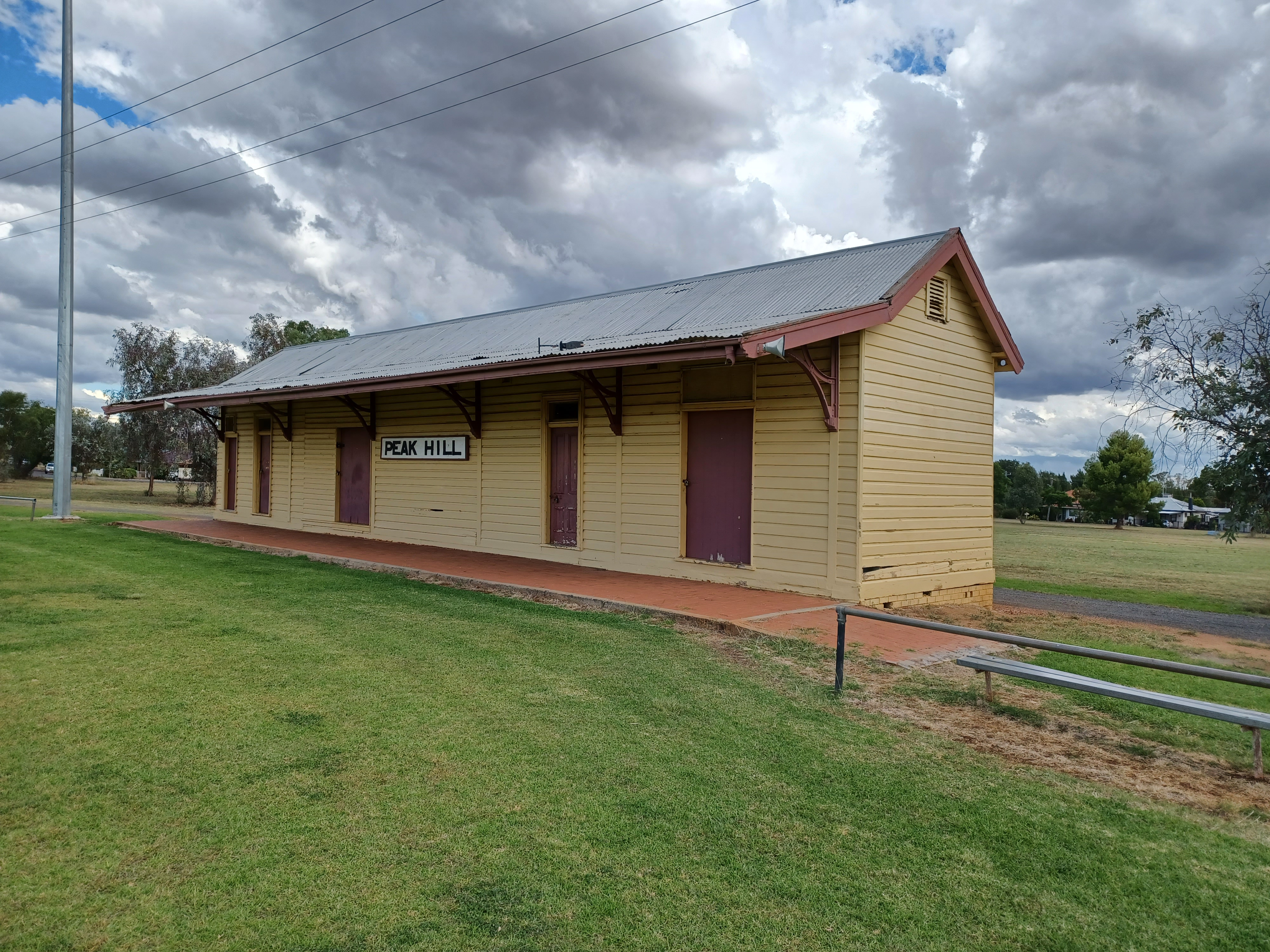
- Peak Hill Railway Station

General information
- Location: Boori Street, Peak Hill, New South Wales; Australia
- Coordinates: 32.727444513°S 148.18758922°E
Location

Peak Hill Railway Station is a former railway station located at Peak Hill, New South Wales.

== History ==
The first Peak Hill railway station was built and came into operation on 12 December 1910. It was located on the Narromine to Peak Hill line. The Peak Hill to Parkes section of the rail line was not completed until 1914. The original station building burnt down on 30 January 1934.

The building was not rebuilt as it was decided to move the Goonumbla railway station to Peak Hill instead. The Goonumbla station c.1920 was larger and more modern than the original building.

Passenger rail services ceased in 1974 and when the railway ceased to operate in February 1982 the building was scheduled for demolition. The community fought to save the building and it was moved once again from the railway line to Lindner oval where it now serves as an amenities block and storeroom.

== Description ==
The Peak Hill (old Goonumbla) station measures 20.7m (68 feet) by 3.6m (12 feet).

== See also ==
List of regional railway stations in New South Wales
