= Peak Hill, New South Wales =

Peak Hill New South Wales
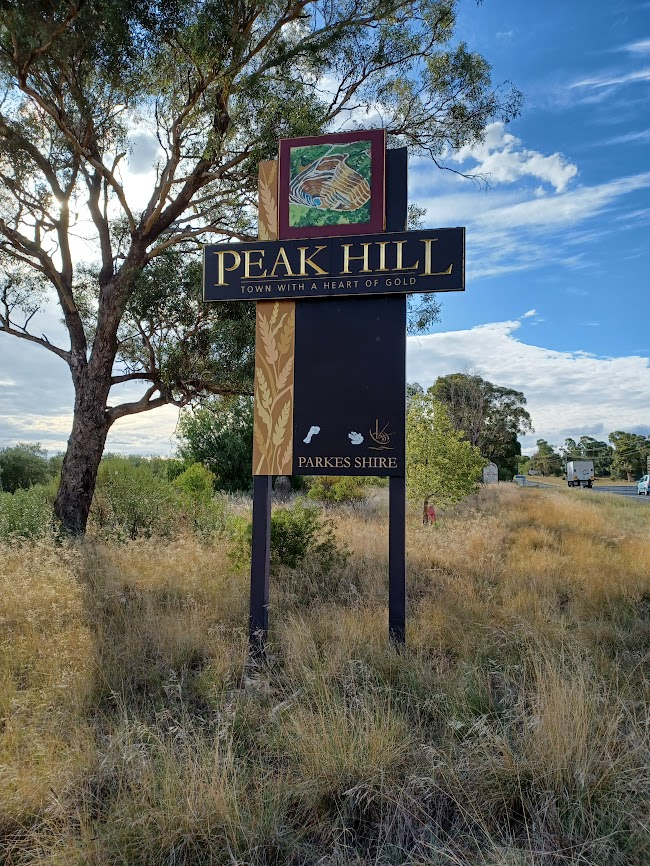
- Peak Hill - Town with a Heart of Gold

- Coordinates: 32°43′S 148°11′E
- Population: 768 (2021 census)
- Established: 1889
- Postcode(s): 2869
- Elevation: 285 m (935 ft)
- Location: 409 km (254 mi) WNW of Sydney; 72 km (45 mi) SW of Dubbo; 49 km (30 mi) N of Parkes
- LGA(s): Parkes Shire
- State electorate(s): Orange
- Federal division(s): Parkes
Mean max temp	Mean min temp	Annual rainfall
24.6 °C; 76 °F	12.0 °C; 54 °F	561.4 mm 22.1 in

Peak Hill is a town in Parkes Shire in the Central West of New South Wales, Australia. At the 2021 census, Peak Hill had a population of 768. It is located on the Newell Highway and the Parkes to Narromine railway line.

== History ==
Before the arrival of Europeans, the Peak Hill area was part of the Wiradjuri people's lands. In 1817, the explorer John Oxley and his party were the first Europeans in the region. In 1889, gold was discovered in the area, and later that year Peak Hill was gazetted in November 1889. The Post office opened on 7 November 1889, and the Bureau of Meteorology's weather station began in 1965. The first public wheat silo built in Australia was constructed at Peak Hill in 1918 after government surveys indicated the district had great potential as a wheat-producing region.

== Agriculture ==
The district is also a renowned sheep producing area, particularly medium-woolled merinos. There are also five merino studs actively operating in the area, namely Cora Lynn, Genanegie, Towalba, Towonga and Westray. Rams from these studs have been sold throughout Australia, and they all have on-property hoggett ram sales in September, supplying commercial sheep breeders with high-quality young rams to breed from.

== Open Cut Mine ==
The Peak Hill Open Cut Experience is a self guided walk around the open cut mine. The walks follow signposted trails and the mine is fenced off for safety. Numerous information panels are located at the mines entry and long the paths at the various viewing platforms. A public toilet is located at the mine site. Relics from the early mining days are on display and the site is very popular with visitors of all ages.

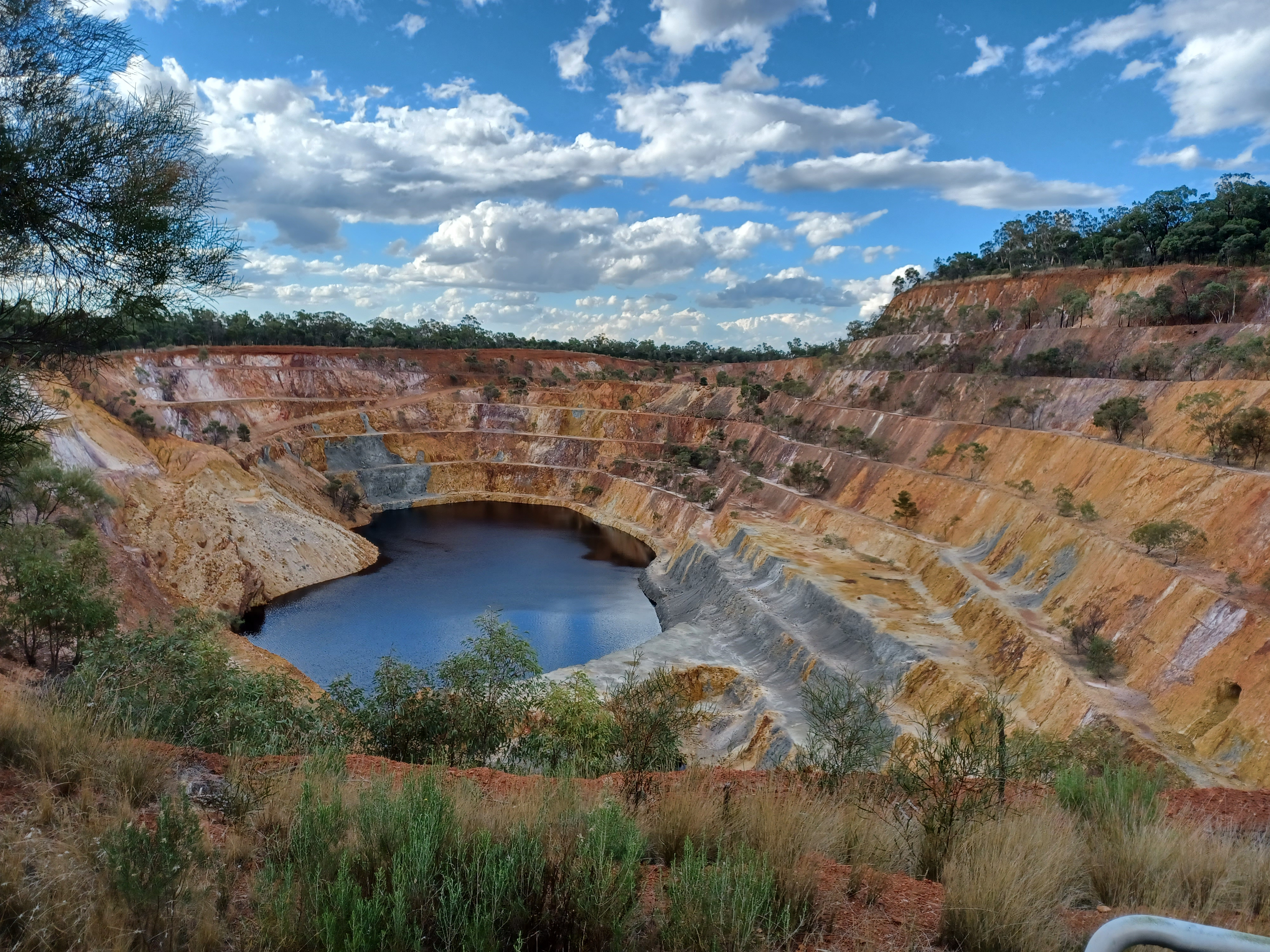
Open Cut Mine Peak Hill

== Facilities ==
Peak Hill has a Catholic primary school St Joseph's, and a public central school.

Peak Hill has three motels, one hotel and two caravan parks. It also has a post office, RSL club, bowling club, golf club, cafes, antique shops, newsagency, supermarket, butcher shop, art gallery, book shop, hairdressers and beauty salons. There is a showground that has harness races and an annual agricultural show.

Peak Hill offers many tourist attractions such as the open cut gold mine, flora and fauna reserve nature walk, Bogan Weir, Australia's first upright wheat silo, heritage listed hospital, arts and crafts, Big Fish fossil hut, and a unique street facade which takes visitors back in time.

The local community operates a volunteer-run radio station: PeakHillFM89.5. The station provides a round-the-clock service of classic hits seven days per week.

Peak Hill styles itself as 'The Town With a Heart of Gold' to reflect its proximity to the goldmine, and lends its facilities as a base for tourists of Wiradjuri Country.

== Climate ==
Peak Hill has a rather dry humid subtropical climate (Cfa), with characteristics of a hot semi-arid climate (BSh). Summers are very hot and winters fairly cool, with significant variation between the seasons. Severe thunderstorms are common in the spring and summer months. Peak Hill is very sunny with 153.8 clear days annually.

Climate data for Peak Hill Post Office (1965–2025, rainfall to 1890); 285 m AMSL; 32.72° S, 148.19° E
Month	Jan	Feb	Mar	Apr	May	Jun	Jul	Aug	Sep	Oct	Nov	Dec	Year
Record high °C (°F)	45.0 (113.0)	46.0 (114.8)	40.0 (104.0)	36.0 (96.8)	28.2 (82.8)	24.7 (76.5)	23.4 (74.1)	28.4 (83.1)	35.9 (96.6)	39.0 (102.2)	43.8 (110.8)	45.5 (113.9)	46.0 (114.8)
Mean daily maximum °C (°F)	33.5 (92.3)	32.6 (90.7)	29.5 (85.1)	25.1 (77.2)	20.0 (68.0)	16.3 (61.3)	15.4 (59.7)	17.2 (63.0)	20.8 (69.4)	25.0 (77.0)	28.5 (83.3)	31.6 (88.9)	24.6 (76.3)
Mean daily minimum °C (°F)	19.5 (67.1)	19.3 (66.7)	16.5 (61.7)	12.3 (54.1)	8.7 (47.7)	6.1 (43.0)	4.9 (40.8)	5.7 (42.3)	8.0 (46.4)	11.6 (52.9)	14.7 (58.5)	17.4 (63.3)	12.1 (53.7)
Record low °C (°F)	7.4 (45.3)	7.8 (46.0)	4.3 (39.7)	1.5 (34.7)	−0.7 (30.7)	−2.8 (27.0)	−3.0 (26.6)	−3.6 (25.5)	−1.0 (30.2)	1.7 (35.1)	3.8 (38.8)	6.2 (43.2)	−3.6 (25.5)
Average rainfall mm (inches)	59.0 (2.32)	50.5 (1.99)	51.8 (2.04)	43.2 (1.70)	44.1 (1.74)	43.4 (1.71)	45.0 (1.77)	42.5 (1.67)	39.3 (1.55)	48.0 (1.89)	49.0 (1.93)	51.4 (2.02)	567.3 (22.33)
Average rainy days (≥ 0.2mm)	5.2	5.0	4.9	4.4	5.9	7.7	7.9	7.1	6.2	6.4	5.6	5.3	71.6
Average afternoon relative humidity (%)	32	36	38	42	52	61	59	51	44	38	36	31	43
Source: Bureau of Meteorology

== Silos ==
Peak Hill's central position in the New South Wales wheat belt may have been the reason why Peak Hill became the site for Australia's first upright bulk wheat silo in 1918. It was not until 1927 that the next stage, the six-bin silos and weighbridge complex, was completed at Peak Hill. In 1950 the construction of three additional 50,000-bushel bins was carried out and the bulkhead was completed in 1959.

After viewing the current silo, it will become apparent that they have grown substantially over the years to cope with the local grain production. A lot of locally grown grain is also taken over to the Parkes silo.

The Peak Hill silo can be viewed from Lindner Avenue, which runs parallel with the railway line.

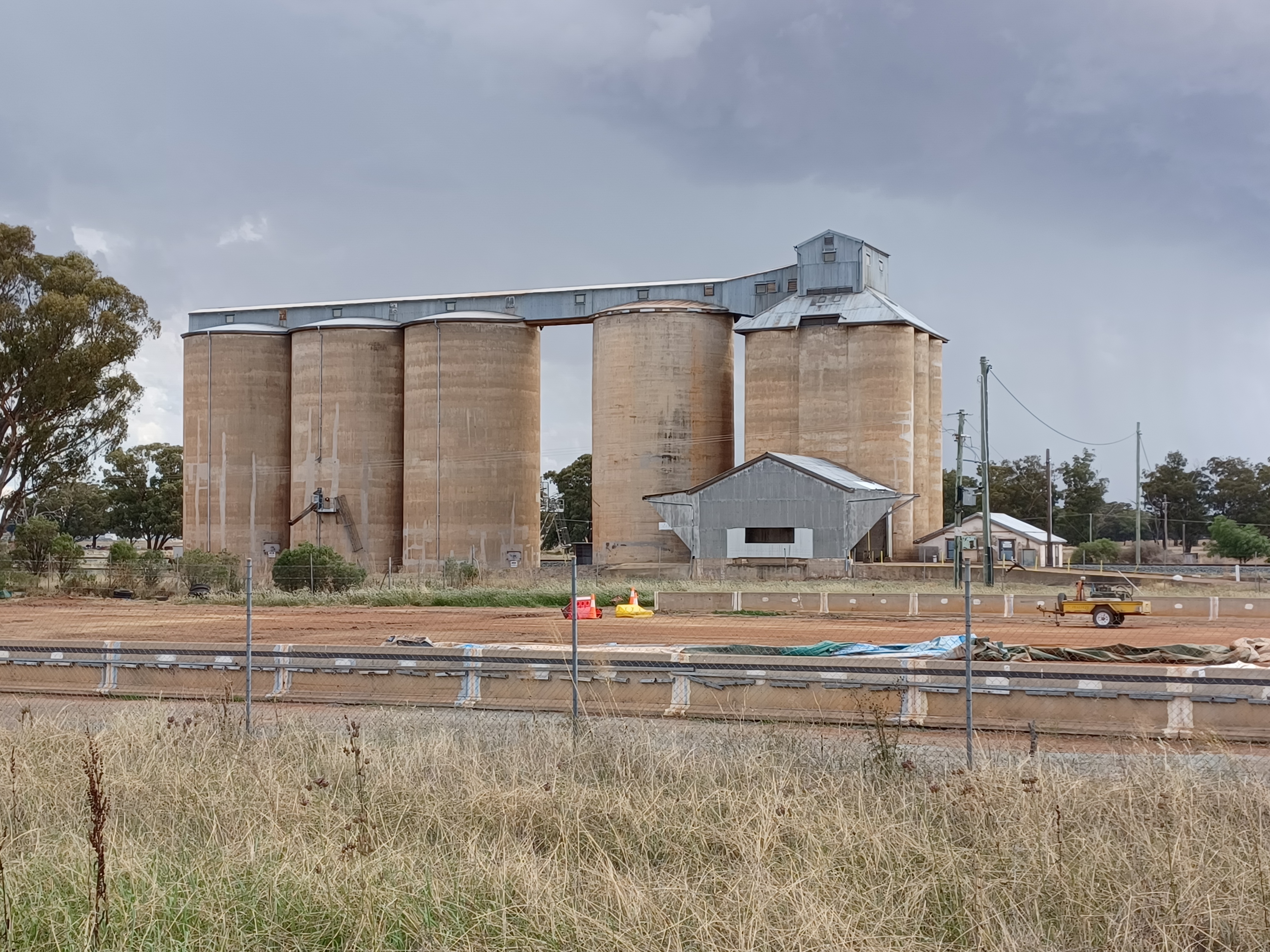
Peak Hill Silo

== War memorials ==
Peak Hill has a war memorial at the Peak Hill Cemetery located north of the town on the Newell Highway.

There is also the AIF War Memorial School of Arts, the War Memorial park, and the War Memorial Pool.

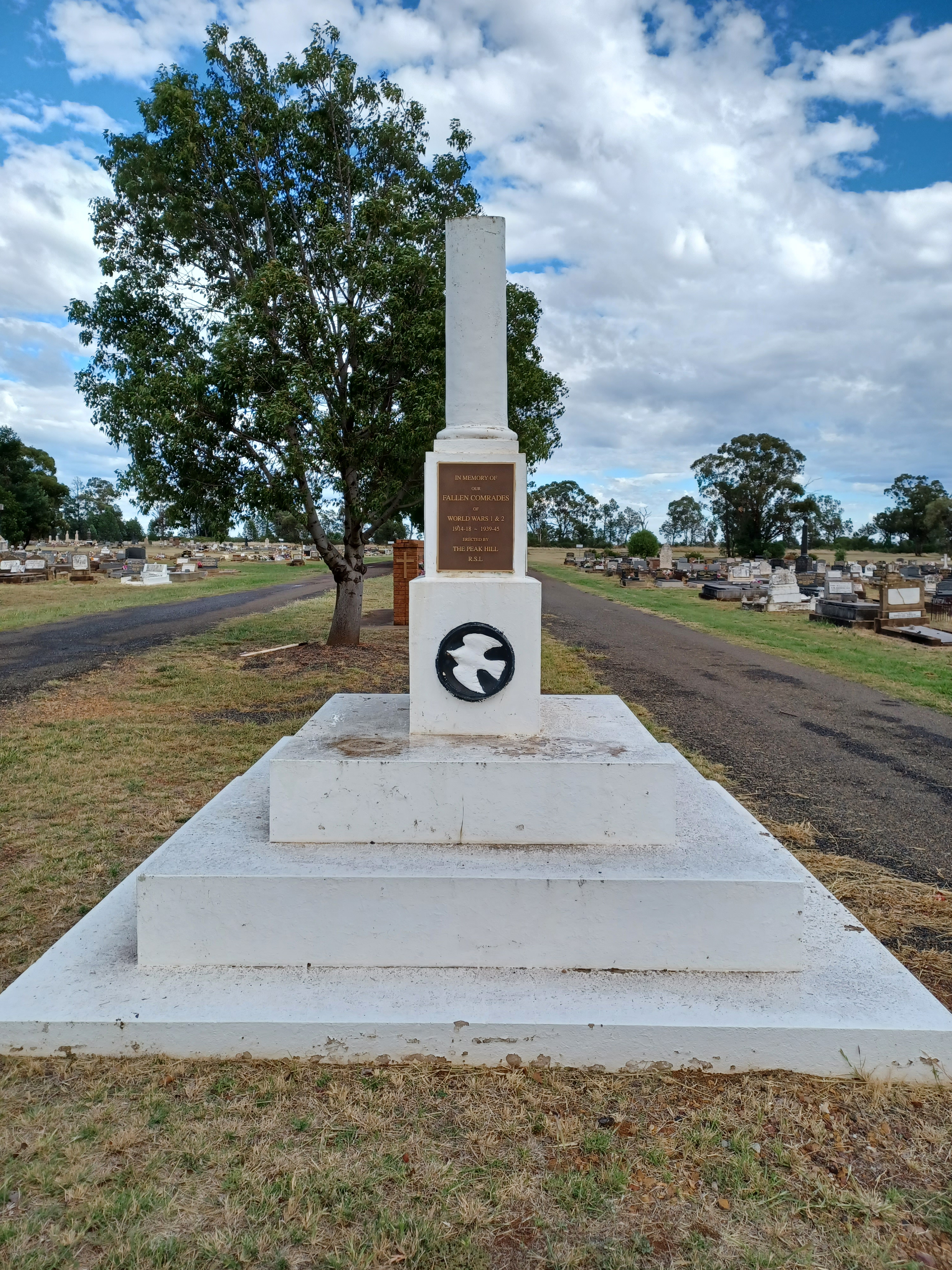
War Memorial Peak Hill

== Places to see ==
- Post Office – built 1899
- Peak Hill Railway Station – now at Lindner Oval
- Club House Hotel – 1910
- Carrington Hotel
- Peak Hill District Hospital – Heritage listed Victorian style building from 1904
- St James Catholic Church – Heritage listed Catholic Church
- St Joseph's Primary School
- Sisters of Mercy Convent
- Masonic Hall
- AIF Memorial School of Arts

== Recreation areas ==
- War Memorial Park
- Lindner Oval and Recreational area
- Commercial Gardens
- Bogan River reserve
- War Memorial Pool
- Bowling Club
- Golf Club

Historical population
Year	Pop.	±%
1921	1,078	—
1933	1,224	+13.5%
1947	1,144	−6.5%
1954	1,409	+23.2%
1961	1,451	+3.0%
1966	1,387	−4.4%
1971	1,258	−9.3%
1976	994	−21.0%
1981	1,037	+4.3%
1986	1,097	+5.8%
1991	981	−10.6%
1996	1,061	+8.2%
2001	965	−9.0%
2006	946	−2.0%
2011	755	−20.2%
2016	722	−4.4%
2021	768	+6.4%
Source: Australian Bureau of Statistics data.

== Notable people ==
- Graham Murray, rugby league player and coach
- Willie Tonga, Rugby League Player
- Esi Tonga, Rugby League Player, Entrepreneur
- Hanley, Kitty (Kate) (c. 1845–1917) Wiradjuri Elder and midwife
- Sergeant George Brayne (c. 1851–1906)
- William Yeo, farmer and State president of the Returned Servicemen's League.
- Frost, Charles Leslie (1897–1971) Aboriginal leader.
- Mingay, Oswald Francis (Ossie) (1895–1973) radio engineer, soldier and publisher
