= Darby Medlyn =

Australian rugby league player

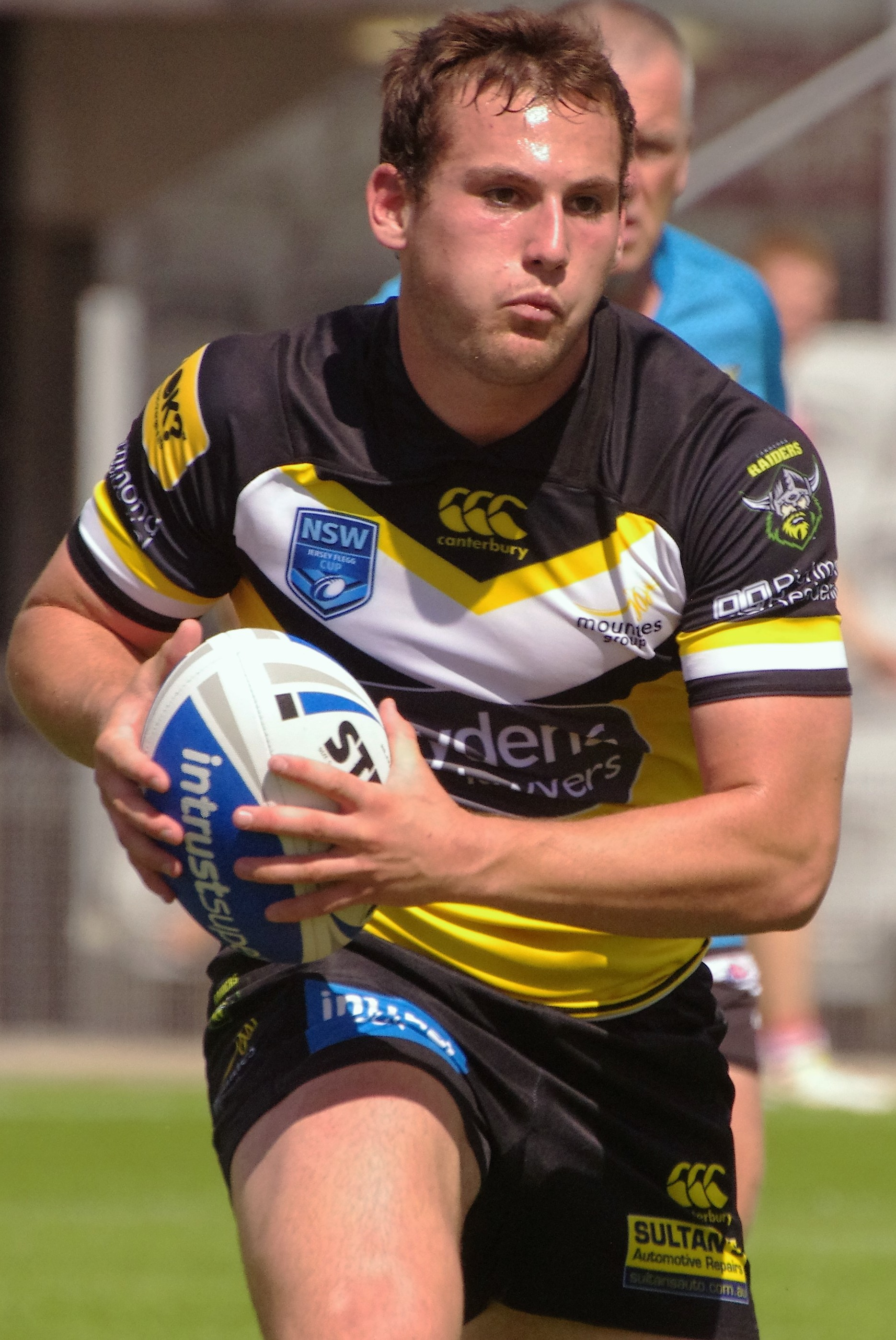

Personal information
- Full name: Darby Medlyn
- Born: 7 November 1999 (age 25); Parkes, New South Wales, Australia
- Height: 184 cm (6 ft 0 in)
- Weight: 94 kg (14 st 11 lb)

Playing information
- Position: Lock
Club
Years	Team	Pld	T	G	FG	P
2020	Canberra Raiders	1	0	0	0	0
- Source: As of 11 October 2020

Darby Medlyn (born 7 November 1999) is a professional rugby league footballer who plays as a lock for the Canberra Raiders in the NRL. He is in a relationship with Nicky Davies.

== Career ==
=== 2020 ===
Medlyn made his first grade debut in round 20 of the 2020 NRL season for Canberra against the Cronulla-Sutherland Sharks at Kogarah Oval.

=== 2021 ===
Medlyn made no appearances for Canberra in the 2021 NRL season. He was later released by the club.
