= Parkes, New South Wales =

Town in New South Wales, Australia

Parkes
- Town
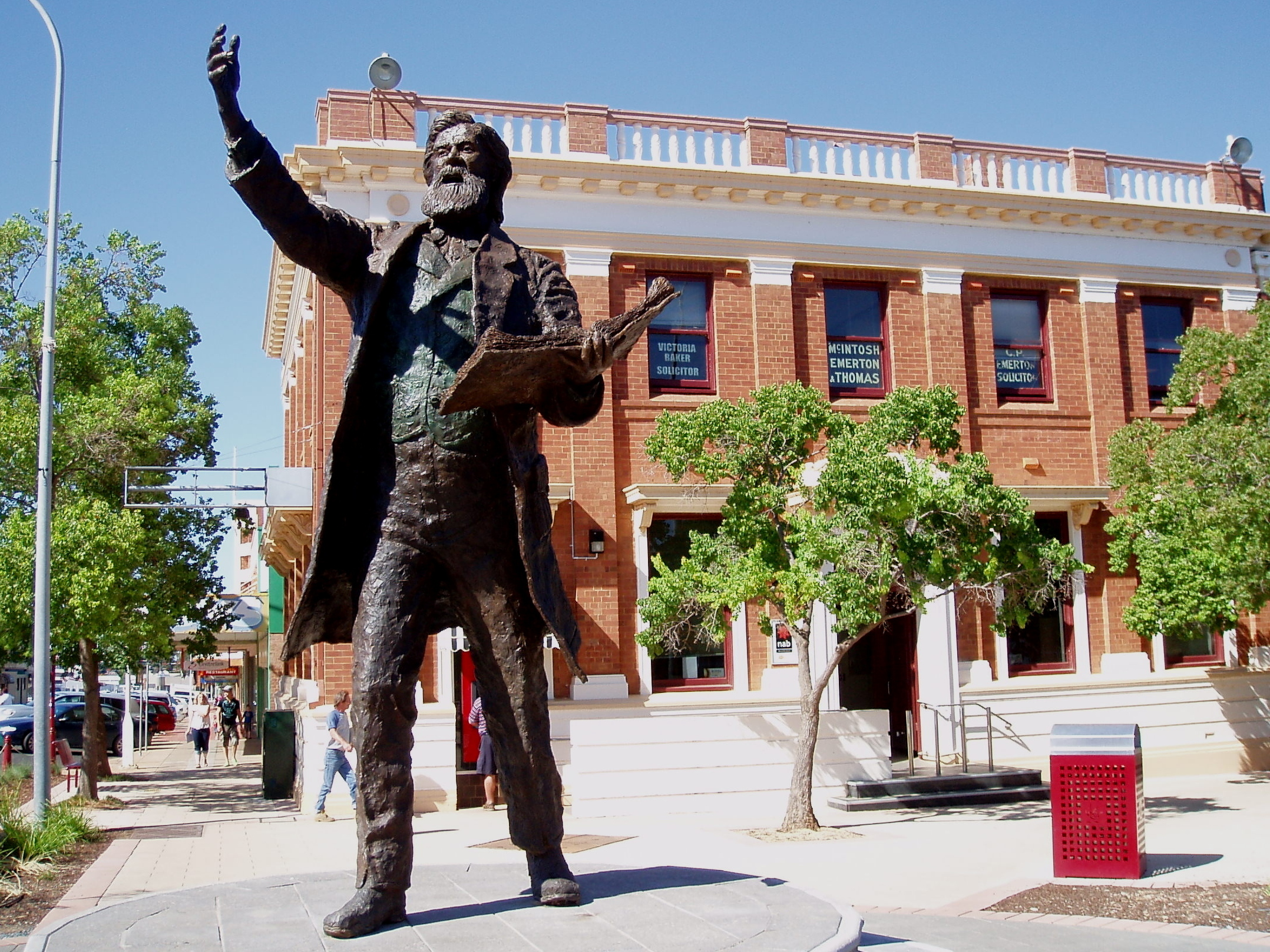
- A statue of Sir Henry Parkes, the town's namesake

- Coordinates: 33°08′0″S 148°10′0″E
- Country: Australia
- State: New South Wales
- LGA: Parkes Shire
- Location: 355 km (221 mi) W of Sydney; 100 km (62 mi) W of Orange; 33 km (21 mi) NNE of Forbes; 102 km (63 mi) E of Condobolin; 120 km (75 mi) SSW of Dubbo
- Established: 1873

Government
  - State electorate: Orange
  - Federal division: Parkes
- Elevation: 324 m (1,063 ft)

Population
  - Total: 9,832 (2021)
- Postcode: 2870
- County: Ashburnham
- Mean max temp: 23.4 °C (74.1 °F)
- Mean min temp: 10.9 °C (51.6 °F)
- Annual rainfall: 587.5 mm (23.13 in)

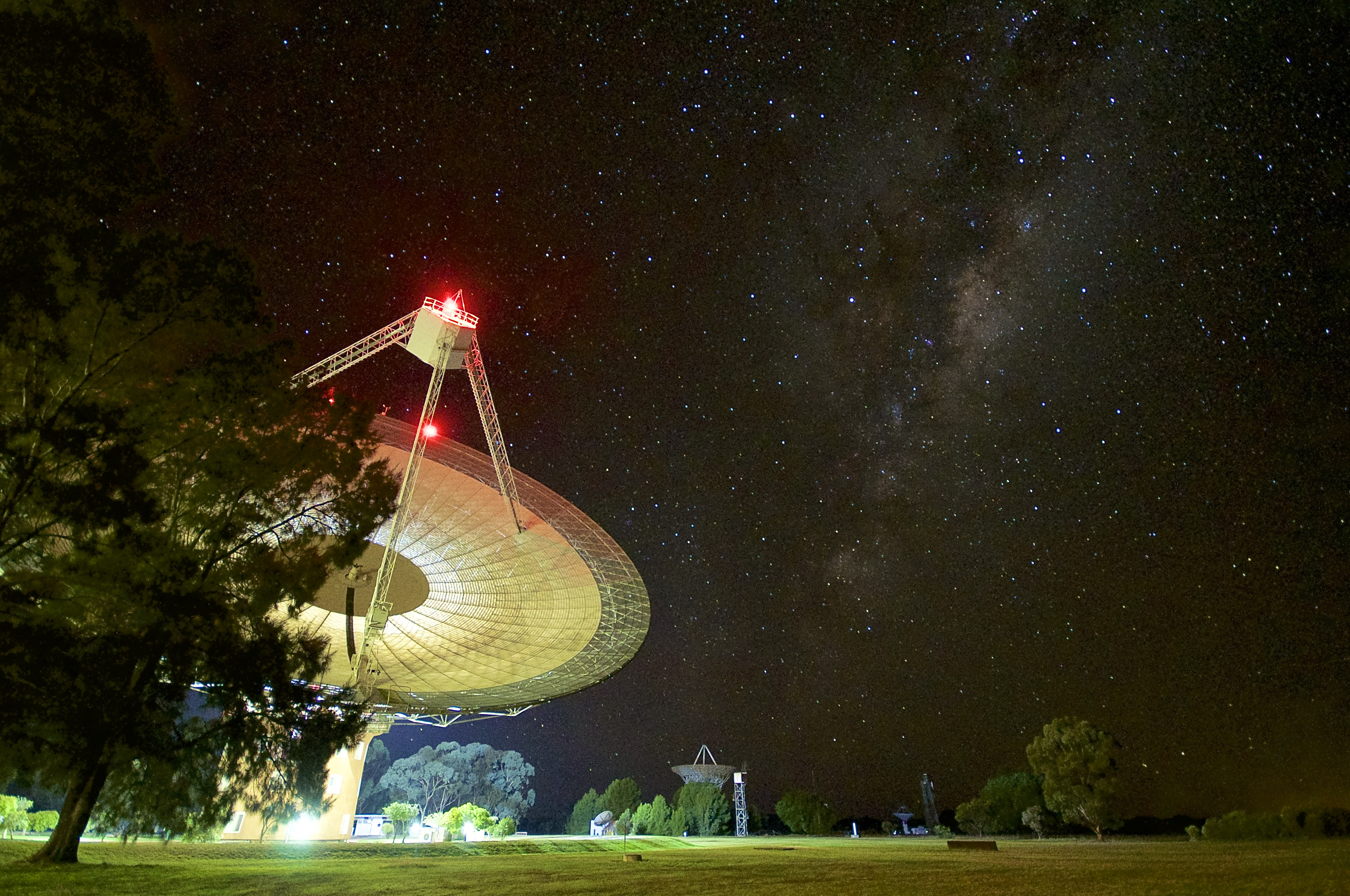
The 64-metre radio telescope of Parkes Observatory in Parkes, New South Wales is an important Southern Hemisphere radio telescope.

Parkes is a town in the Central West region of New South Wales, Australia. It is the main settlement in the local government area of Parkes Shire. Parkes had a population of 9,832 at the 2021 census.

Parkes is part of the traditional lands of the Wiradjuri people, the largest language group in NSW with a country of more than 120,000 square kilometres.

== History ==
The Wiradjuri people have lived on the lands of the 3 rivers, including the Lachlan River, for more than 40,000 years.

The town of Parkes was part of the colonial expansion of the early 19th century, originally founded in 1853 as the settlement Currajong, named for the abundance of kurrajong trees in the local area by the settlers, but was then known as Bushman's (from the local mine named Bushman's Lead).

In August 1873, Henry Parkes, then the Premier of New South Wales, visited the area and in December 1873 the town was officially renamed Parkes in his honour.

Bushman's Lead Post Office opened on 1 August 1872 and was renamed Parkes in 1873. In March 1883 the first local government, Parkes Municipal District (redesignated as Parkes Municipality March 1906), was proclaimed. In January 1981 it was amalgamated with Goobang Shire to create Parkes Shire.

The railway from Molong via Parkes to Forbes, was officially opened on 18 December 1893.

Parkes attracted significant attention during the gold rush of the 1870s onwards, and to this day modern mining companies have sites in the region.

In 1939, Parkes became a sister city with Coventry in the United Kingdom, Sir Henry Parkes birthplace.

In January 2026, Parkes became the destination for the Elvis Express for the annual Elvis Festival, in the world's biggest tribute to Elvis Presley outside Memphis, Tennessee.

=== Newspapers ===
Parkes' first newspaper was the Forbes and Parkes Gazette, founded and conducted for many years by H. H. Cooke. This was followed by the Parkes Independent. The Parkes Chronicle published by W. McNamara was amalgamated with the Parkes Independent which was subsequently purchased by Charles Reynolds; and later again, by George Washington Seaborn. In 1891 came the Parkes Examiner. The Examiner was still operating by 1901, edited by Alderman Harry Bowditch who acquired it in 1893. Commencing in 1894 was the Western Champion by M. J. Little and D. Cameron. At a later time, Cameron also acquired the Independent. In 1899 the Champion was purchased by 1899. Later journalistic ventures included the Western Reminder and the Western People. The Examiner was renamed the Parkes Post in 1923, before becoming part of the Champion company in 1926. By 1934, these were merged to become the Champion Post.

=== Military history ===
During World War II, Parkes was the location of RAAF Station Parkes, and RAAF No.18 Inland Aircraft Fuel Depot (IAFD), completed in 1942 and closed on 14 August 1944. Usually consisting of 4 tanks, 31 fuel depots were built across Australia for the storage and supply of aircraft fuel for the RAAF and the US Army Air Forces at a total cost of £900,000 ($1,800,000).

== Heritage listings ==
Parkes has a number of heritage-listed sites, including:

- 39 Currajong Street: Parkes Post Office
- May Street: Parkes railway station

== Parkes today ==
Historical population
Year	Pop.	±%
1921	3,941	—
1933	5,846	+48.3%
1947	6,897	+18.0%
1954	7,973	+15.6%
1961	8,223	+3.1%
1966	8,442	+2.7%
1971	8,849	+4.8%
1976	8,905	+0.6%
1981	9,047	+1.6%
1986	8,739	−3.4%
1991	8,784	+0.5%
1996	10,094	+14.9%
2001	9,785	−3.1%
2006	9,826	+0.4%
2011	10,026	+2.0%
2016	9,964	−0.6%
2021	9,832	−1.3%
Source: Australian Bureau of Statistics data.

With the presence of the nearby Parkes Observatory, Parkes has had an important role in the scientific community. In addition to local research conducted at the radio telescope, Parkes scientists have assisted NASA for several missions as a Southern Hemisphere relay and communications station. The movie The Dish was based somewhat loosely on the role the telescope played during the 1969 Apollo 11 Moon landing. The Dish, although set in Parkes, was largely filmed in Forbes' historic precinct. This is due to very few historic buildings remaining in Parkes. Parkes is also home to the Parkes Spacemen rugby league club.

Agriculture is one of the primary industries in the Parkes region, particularly cropping, sheep farming and cattle farming.

The area also features a copper and gold mine, Northparkes Mine, 27 km north-north-west of the town.

Parkes became a key country location after the completion of the railway to Broken Hill in 1927, serving as a hub for a great deal of passenger and freight transport until the 1980s. Unfortunately, as successive governments reduced the NSW country rail systems, this part of the economy was largely lost to the community.

Periodically governments and businesses have raised the topic of an "inland port" whereby Parkes Regional Airport would be expanded considerably to serve as a starting point for domestic and international freight destined for areas in NSW, Victoria and Queensland. Environmental studies are complete, development consents are in place, contracts have been exchanged, some properties have changed hands and studies are continuing.

Parkes Shire Council, with approval from the State Government, has rezoned 516 hectares of agricultural and industrial land on the western edge of the town for the development of the Parkes National Logistics Hub with an additional reserve of over 100 hectares. The site has been specifically designed for the 24-hour, 7-day-per-week operation of a multi-modal transport facility.

FCL runs a significant intermodal operation at Goobang Junction on Parkes' western outskirts. On 20 October 2006, Premier Morris Iemma opened Specialised Container Transport's intermodal terminal nearby on a 296-hectare (730-acre) site. It has 5 km of rail sidings, a 7,400-square-metre (80,000 sq ft) warehouse and about 40 staff. An even larger terminal to be sited nearby is also being promoted.

The Roads & Maritime Services' Western Regional Office is located in Parkes. Essential Energy also is represented by a training and maintenance centre.

Main tourist attractions are the CSIRO Telescope 20 km north of town on the Newell Highway, Bushmans Hill, and the War Memorial Lookout. Nearby there is the Goobang National Park, and Peak Hill which features an Open Cut Mine that can be toured during holidays. There are also many great parks.

Parkes has a high percentage population of school age students and an associated number of schools. Parkes Public School was founded in 1876 under Archibald Booth as educator, Parkes East Public School and Middleton Public School are also in the area. Holy Family Catholic School and Parkes Christian School operate in the town, with Saint Patrick's School Trundle and St Joseph's School, Peak Hill also operating the shire.

Parkes High School is the main public high school for the town. Parkes Christian School offers education for students from Kindergarten to Year 10 in 2013, extending to Year 11 in 2014 and Year 12 in 2015. Many Parkes students also attend the nearby Red Bend Catholic College in Forbes, some 35 km south.

== Climate ==
Parkes has a subtropical climate, with significant temperature variations between summer and winter. Under the Köppen climate classification, Parkes lies in the transitional zone between humid subtropical (Cfa) and cold semi-arid (Bsk) climates. Summer maximum temperatures average out at 32 °C (90 °F), however frequently reach 40 °C (104 °F) each year. Winters are cool and partly cloudy, with cold fronts bringing periods of light, misty rain with low maximum temperatures, and rarely even snow. Rainfall in spring and summer usually falls as thunderstorms, with an annual average of 587.5 mm (23.13 in) of rainfall. Extreme temperatures have ranged from −4.2 to 45.5 °C (24.4 to 113.9 °F). Parkes is considerably sunny, having around 135.0 clear days annually.

Climate data for Parkes (Macarthur Street, 1907–2012, rainfall to 1889); 324 m AMSL; 33.14° S, 148.16° E
Month	Jan	Feb	Mar	Apr	May	Jun	Jul	Aug	Sep	Oct	Nov	Dec	Year
Record high °C (°F)	45.2 (113.4)	45.5 (113.9)	40.0 (104.0)	35.4 (95.7)	27.8 (82.0)	26.7 (80.1)	23.3 (73.9)	27.8 (82.0)	34.0 (93.2)	37.7 (99.9)	44.0 (111.2)	42.5 (108.5)	45.5 (113.9)
Mean daily maximum °C (°F)	32.3 (90.1)	31.5 (88.7)	28.5 (83.3)	23.6 (74.5)	18.6 (65.5)	15.0 (59.0)	14.0 (57.2)	15.9 (60.6)	19.5 (67.1)	23.6 (74.5)	27.7 (81.9)	30.6 (87.1)	23.4 (74.1)
Mean daily minimum °C (°F)	17.9 (64.2)	17.8 (64.0)	15.0 (59.0)	10.9 (51.6)	7.5 (45.5)	5.1 (41.2)	4.0 (39.2)	4.9 (40.8)	7.3 (45.1)	10.4 (50.7)	13.5 (56.3)	16.2 (61.2)	10.9 (51.6)
Record low °C (°F)	6.8 (44.2)	6.0 (42.8)	4.5 (40.1)	0.5 (32.9)	−1.5 (29.3)	−4.0 (24.8)	−4.2 (24.4)	−3.6 (25.5)	−2.0 (28.4)	1.0 (33.8)	−0.1 (31.8)	6.2 (43.2)	−4.2 (24.4)
Average precipitation mm (inches)	57.6 (2.27)	49.1 (1.93)	47.4 (1.87)	41.4 (1.63)	47.2 (1.86)	49.5 (1.95)	49.1 (1.93)	49.2 (1.94)	41.8 (1.65)	52.4 (2.06)	49.5 (1.95)	53.0 (2.09)	587.5 (23.13)
Average precipitation days (≥ 0.2 mm)	5.8	5.4	5.4	5.3	7.2	9.3	10.2	9.3	7.7	7.7	6.4	6.2	85.9
Average afternoon relative humidity (%)	34	37	39	43	53	60	60	54	48	42	36	32	45
Source: Bureau of Meteorology

== Transport ==
Parkes has a local bus service provided by Western Road Liners, which acquired Harris Bus Lines in March 2006. The weekly Indian Pacific passes through but does not stop at Parkes. The Outback Xplorer service, run by NSW TrainLink, which heads to Broken Hill on Mondays and Sydney on Tuesdays does stop. Parkes railway station is situated on the Broken Hill railway line, and opened in 1893. A smaller station served Parkes Racecourse between 1923 and 1937. Parkes Airport is served regular air services to Sydney operated by Rex Airlines. The airport is located approximately five kilometres east of the central business district.

Parkes is located on the Australian transcontinental railway line, and the Newell Highway linking Victoria to Queensland.

== Media ==
Radio

- 2PK AM 1404 (talkback radio format aimed at listeners 35 years+ most programs relayed from 2SM, Sydney): owned by Broadcast Operations Group.
- PH FM 88.0 (community access radio station based in Peak Hill, 50 km north from Parkes).
- ROK FM 95.5 (mixed music format aimed at 18–39 years market – Top 40 and Classic Hits): owned by Broadcast Operations Group.
- 2LVR FM 97.9 (community radio)
- Sky Sports Radio FM 99.9 – (Coverage of Thoroughbred, Harness and Greyhound Racing plus other general and specialist sport and talk programming)
- SBS Radio FM 101.3 (mixed format programming for ethnic communities)
- Vision Radio 87.6 FM, Christian Radio

The Australian Broadcasting Corporation (ABC) transmit four stations into Parkes and the surrounding region:

- ABC Classic NSW 2ABCFM 102.7 FM
- ABC Radio National NSW 2ABCRN 104.3 FM
- Triple J NSW 2JJJ 101.9 FM
- ABC Central West NSW 2CR 549 AM – part of the ABC Local Radio network.

Some stations from Dubbo and Orange also transmit into Parkes and the surrounding region.

Television

Parkes receives the following free-to-air television stations:

- Seven, 7two, 7mate, 7flix, 7Bravo – Seven Network owned and operated station channels.
- 10, 10 Drama, 10 Comedy, Nickelodeon, News24 Regional – Network 10 owned and operated station channels.
- WIN Television, 9Go!, 9Gem, 9Life – Nine Network affiliated channels.
- Special Broadcasting Service, SBS, SBS2, SBS Food, SBS WorldWatch, SBS World Movies, NITV
- ABC Television, ABC, ABC Family, ABC Kids, ABC Entertains, ABC News.

Newspapers

There are two local newspapers servicing Parkes.

- The Parkes Champion-Post is published on Monday, Wednesday and Friday. It is owned by Australian Community Media.
- The Parkes Phoenix is a free weekly paper that is published on Fridays. It is part of the independently owned Phoenix Group of papers.

== Notable people ==
- Billy Burns, rugby league player
- Dianna Corcoran, country music singer
- Stephen Davies, field hockey player, 1996 Olympian
- Tommy Emmanuel, guitarist – completed his school education in Parkes
- Ian Evans, historian and writer
- David Field, actor
- Trixie Gardner, Baroness Gardner of Parkes – the first Australian woman to have been elevated to the peerage (1981)
- Bryson Goodwin, Australian rugby league footballer
- Mike Leary, rugby league player
- Ben Lovett, rugby league player
- Greg McGirr, NSW Labor politician and father of Trixie Gardner
- Jim McGirr, NSW Labor politician, 28th Premier of New South Wales
- Patrick McGirr, NSW Labor politician
- Darby Medlyn, Australian rugby league footballer
- Harry 'Breaker' Harbord Morant (1864–1902), Anglo-Australian drover, horseman, bush poet, military officer and convicted war criminal
- David Nash, linguist
- Will H. Ogilvie (1869–1963), Scottish-Australian horseman and bush poet and balladist
- James Pritchard, International Rugby player, Rugby World Cup Representative
- Gordon Watson, pianist
- Scott Westcott, marathon runner, 2016 Olympian
- Mariah Williams, field hockey player, 2016 & 2020 Olympian

== Festivals ==
Parkes hosts the annual Parkes Elvis Festival. It is held in early January to celebrate Elvis Presley's birthday and to boost tourism.

== Gallery ==
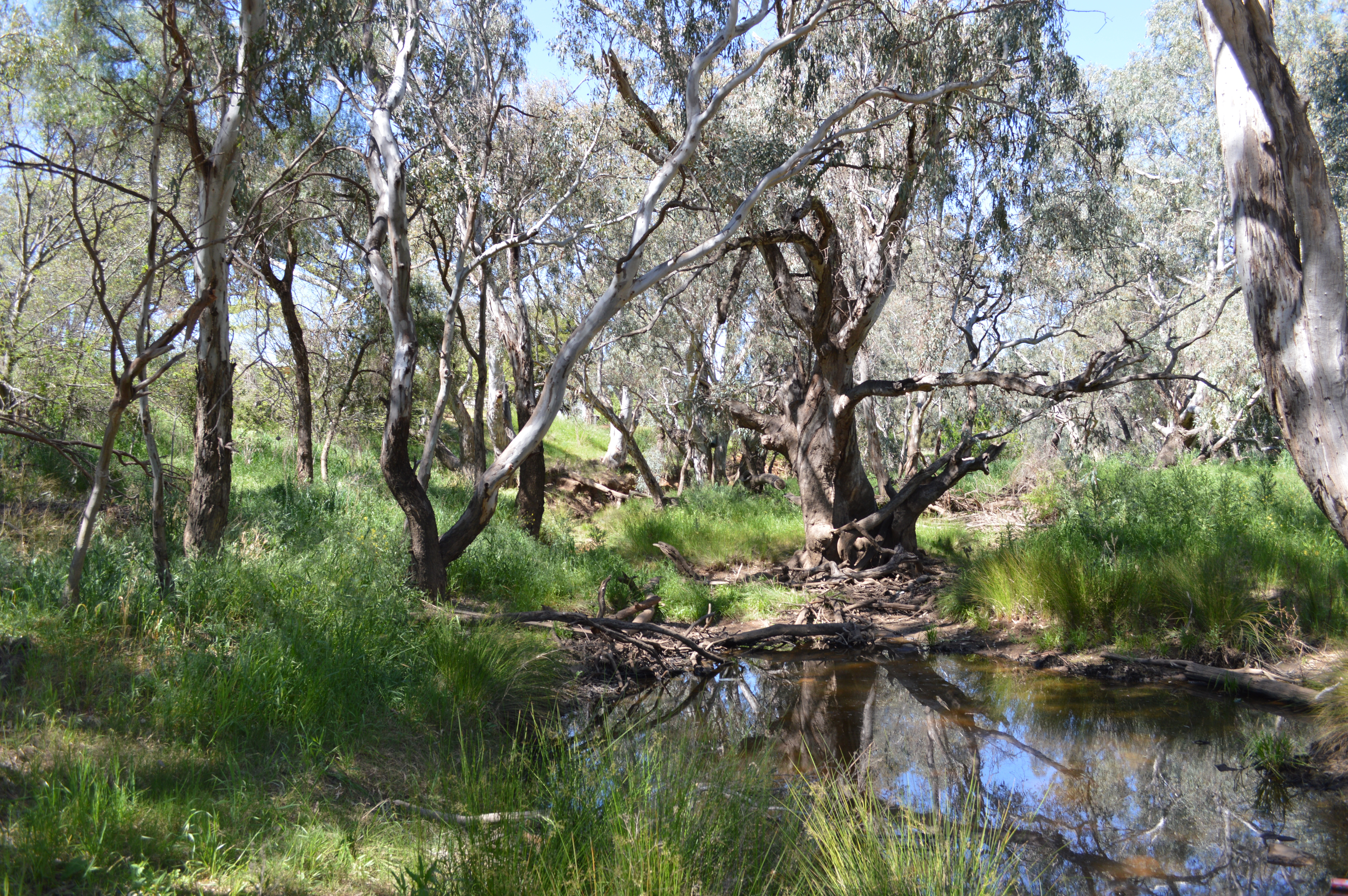
Parkes Billabong Creek

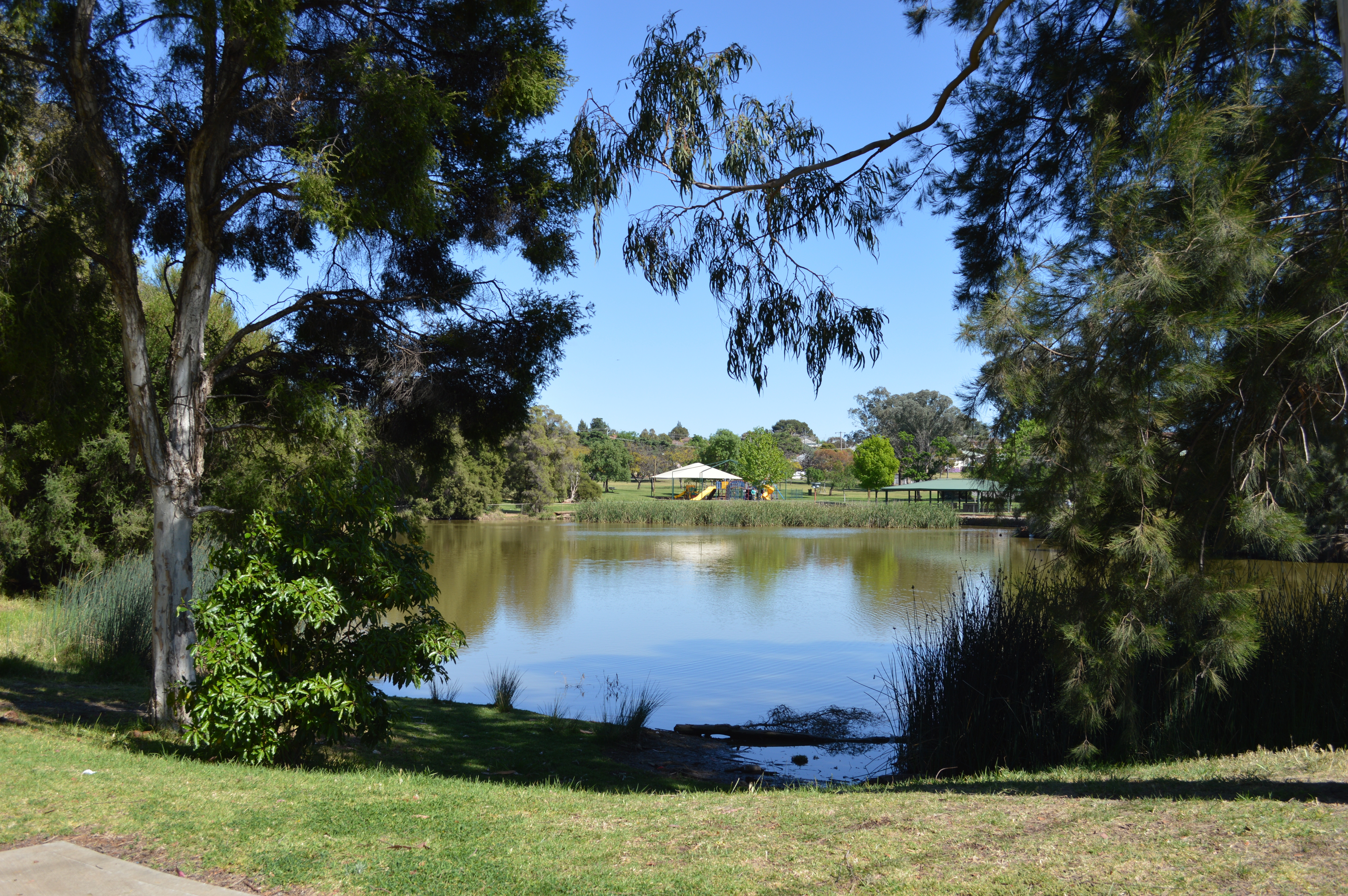
Parkes Bushmans Dam

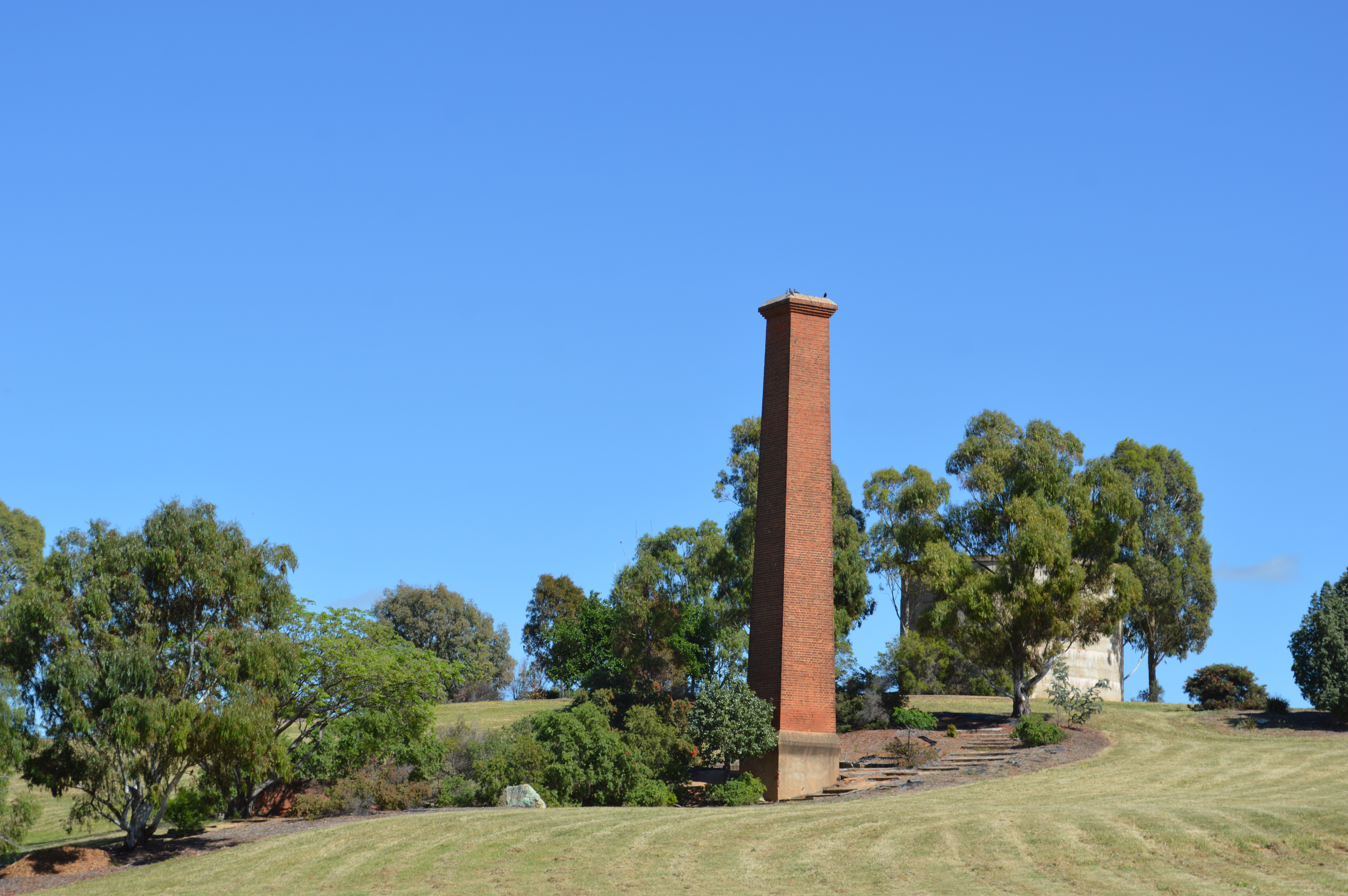
Parkes Bushmans Hill

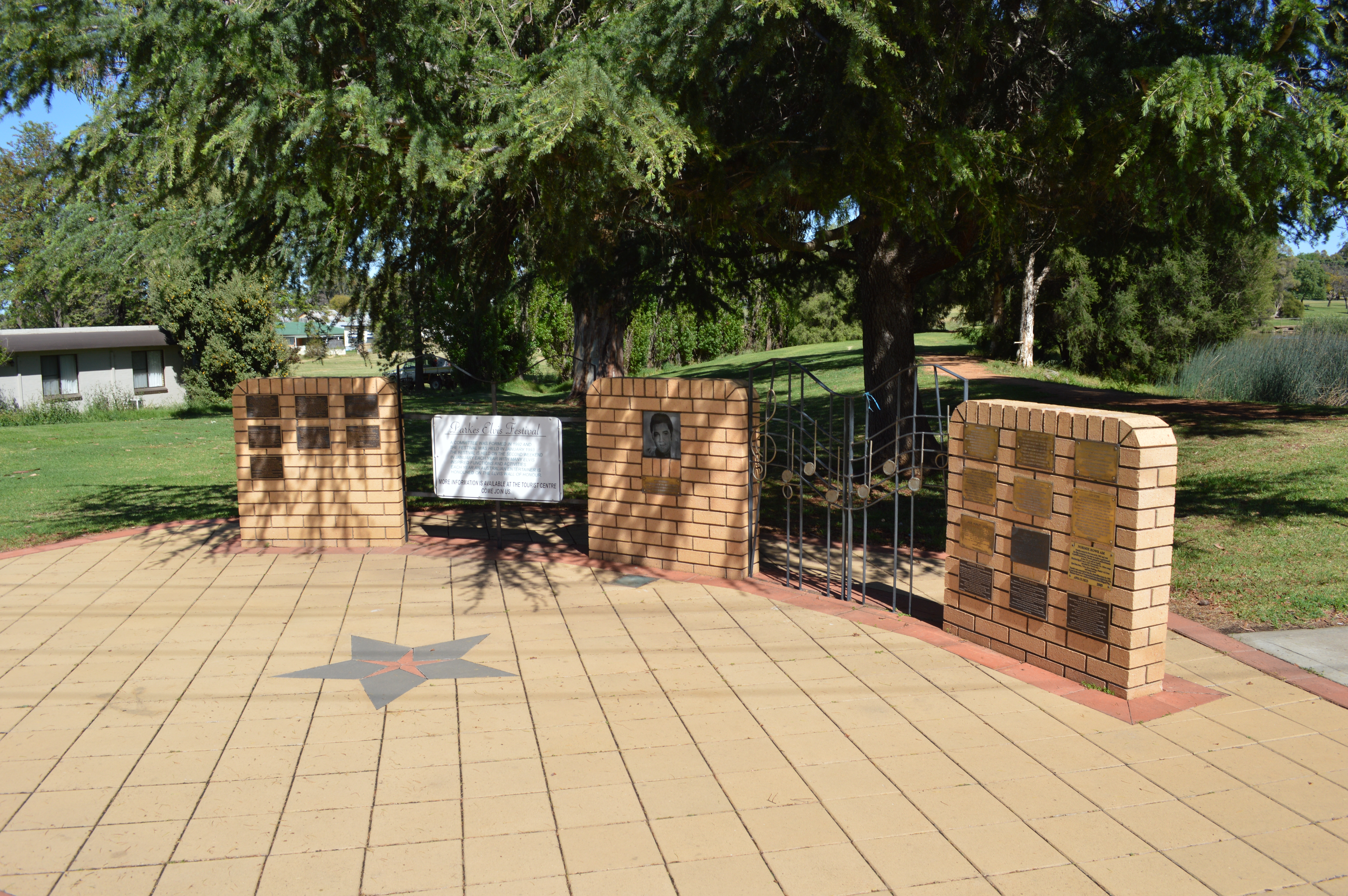
Elvis Memorial

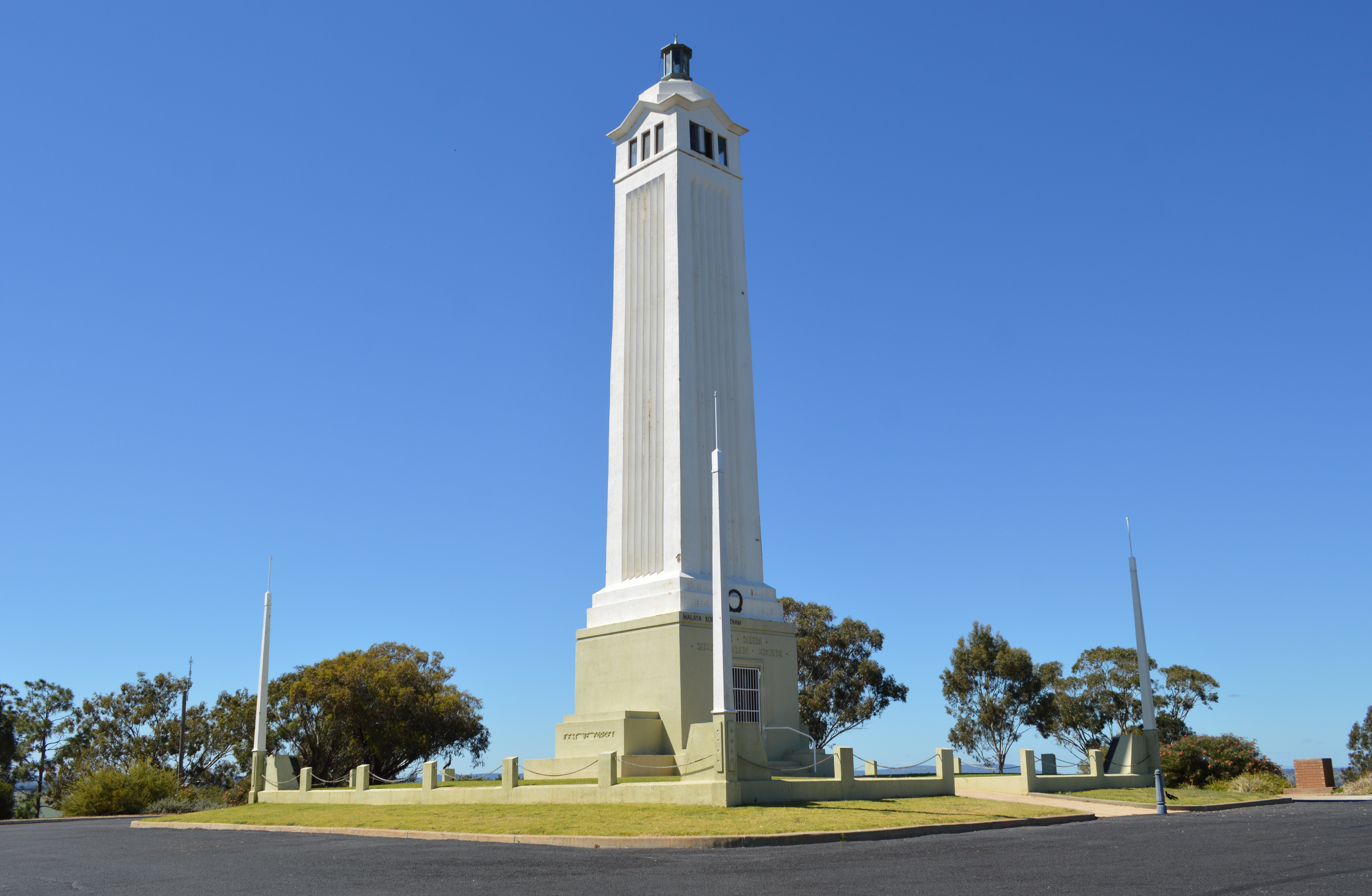
War Memorial

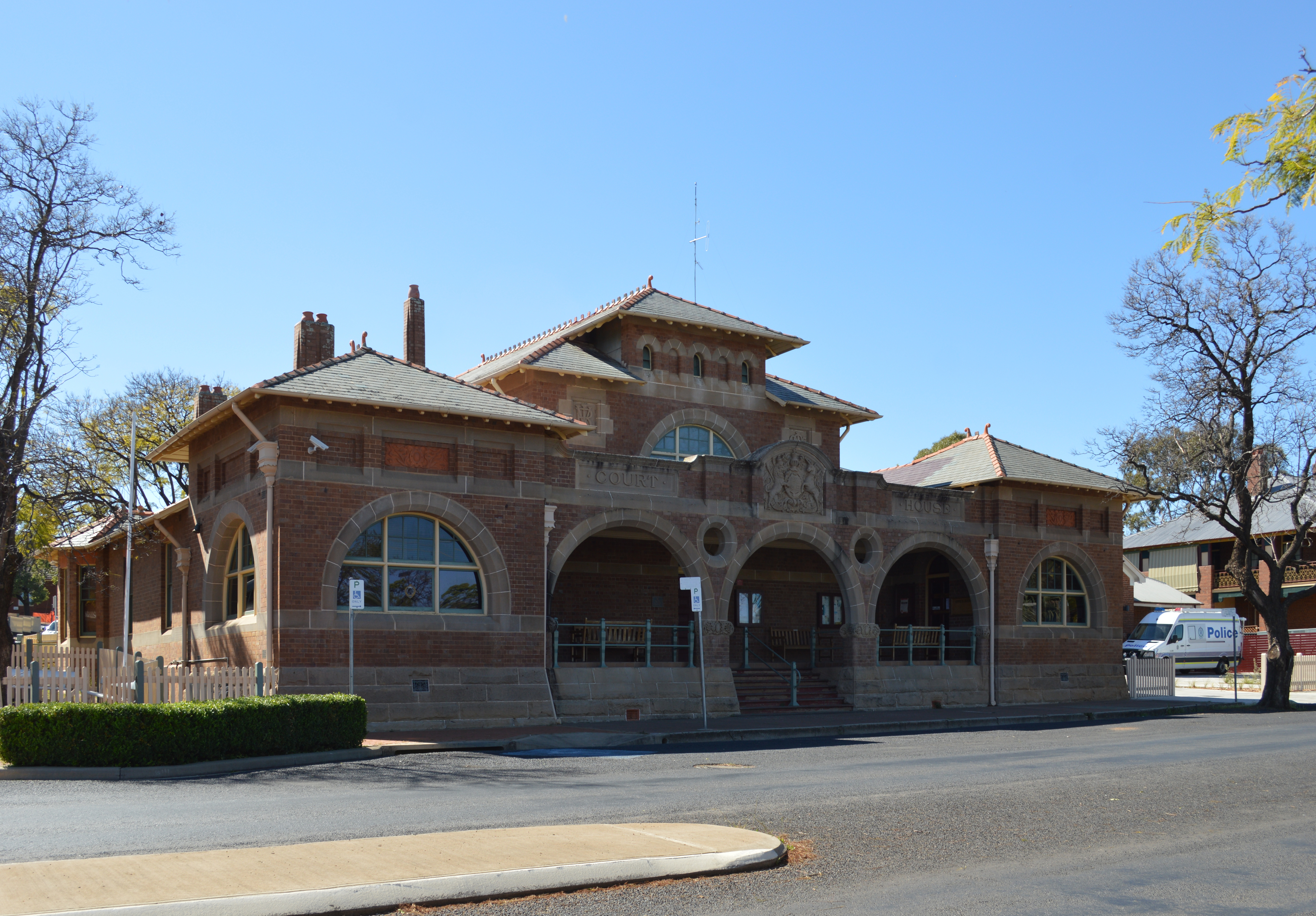
Court House

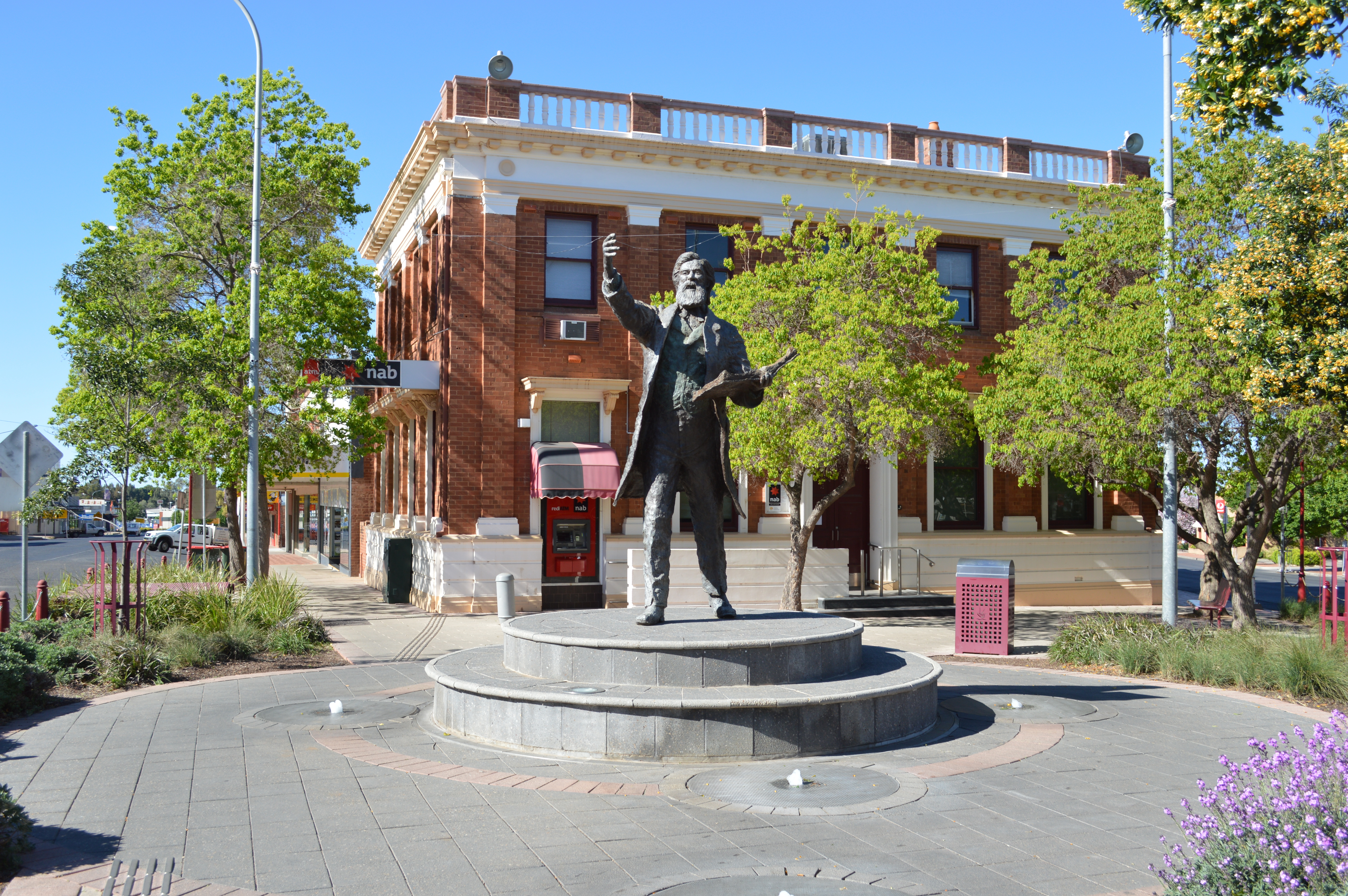
Henry Parkes Statue

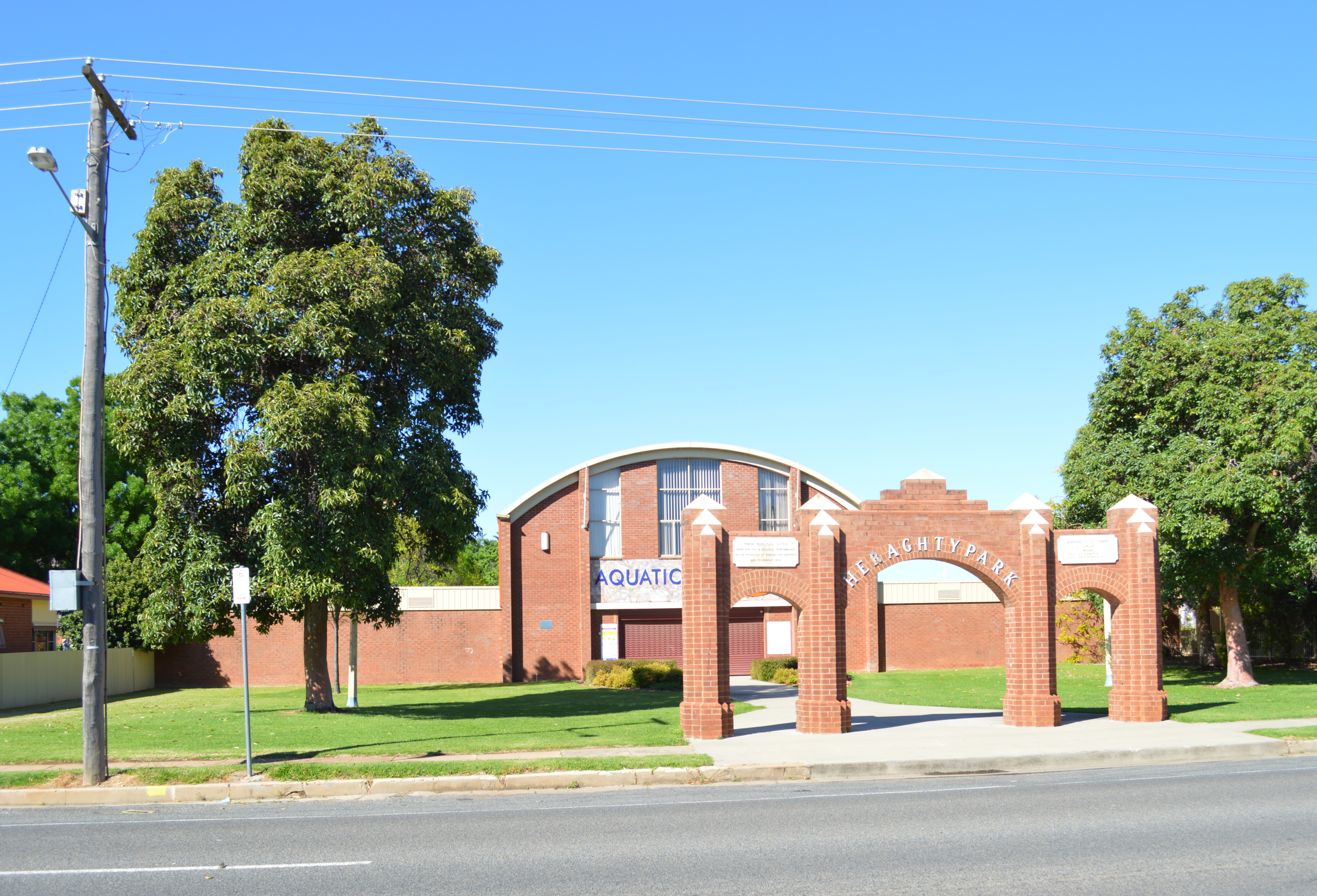
Heraghty Park

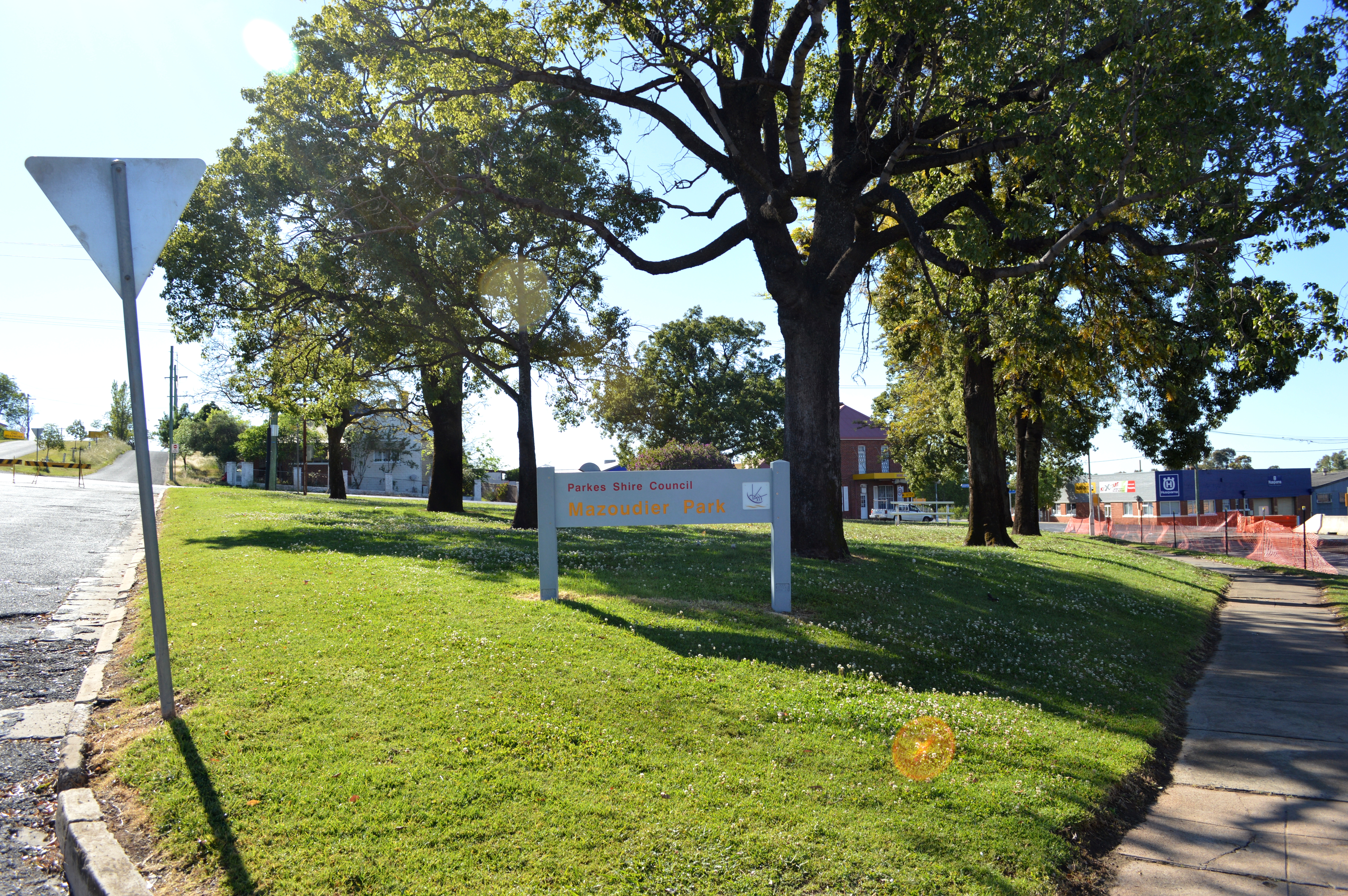
Mazoudier Park

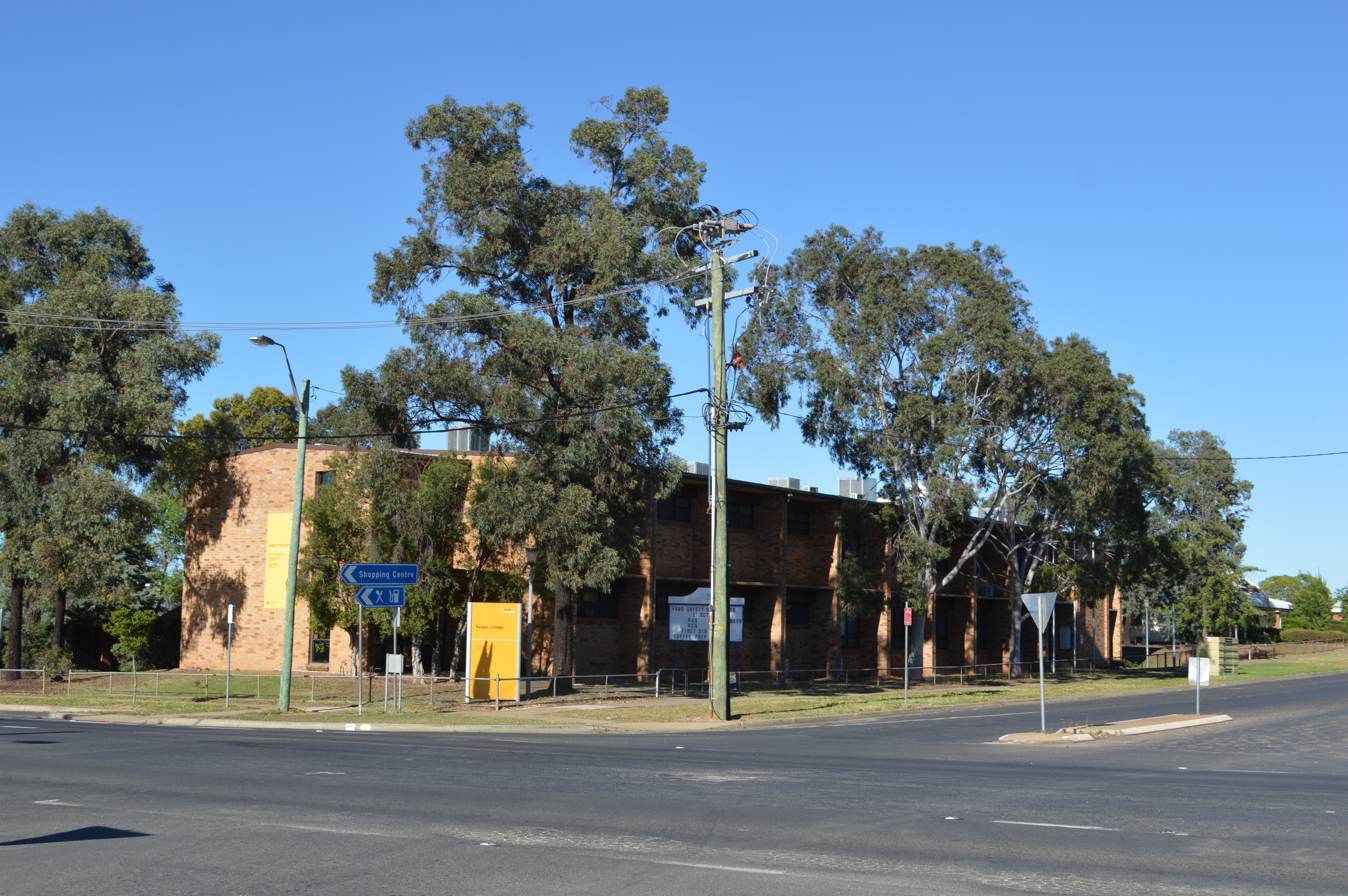
Parkes TAFE College

== See also ==
- ABBA Festival, Trundle
