= Parkes Shire =

- Local government area
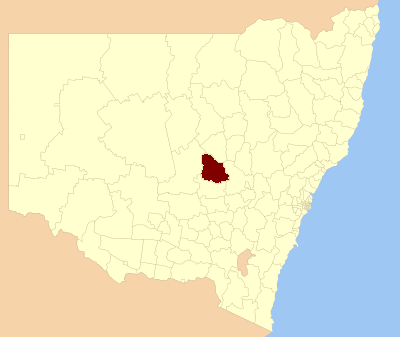
- Location in New South Wales

- Interactive map of Parkes Shire
- Coordinates: 33°08′S 148°10′E
- Country: Australia
- State: New South Wales
- Region: Central West
- Established: 1981
- Council seat: Parkes

Government
  - Mayor: Neil Westcott (Unaligned)
  - State electorate: Orange
  - Federal division: Parkes

Area
  - Total: 5,958 km^{2} (2,300 sq mi)

Population
  - Total: 14,361 (2021 census)
  - Density: 2.41037/km^{2} (6.2428/sq mi)
- Website: Parkes Shire
LGAs around Parkes Shire
Lachlan	Narromine	Dubbo Regional
Lachlan	Parkes Shire	Cabonne
Lachlan	Forbes	Cabonne

Parkes Shire is a local government area in the Central West region of New South Wales, Australia. The Shire is located adjacent to the Broken Hill railway line and the Newell Highway.

The area under administration includes the town of Parkes and the surrounding region of 5,919 square kilometres (2,285 sq mi), with a population of approximately 14,592 as of 2011. The Shire includes the towns of Peak Hill, Alectown, Bogan Gate, Trundle and Tullamore.

The mayor of Parkes Shire Council is Neil Westcott, who is unaligned with any political party.

== Heritage listings ==
Parkes has a number of heritage-listed sites, including:

- 39 Currajong Street: Parkes Post Office
- May Street: Parkes railway station

== Council ==
=== Current composition and election method ===
Parkes Shire Council is composed of ten councillors elected proportionally as a single ward. All councillors are elected for a fixed four-year term of office. The mayor is elected by the councillors at the first meeting of the council. The most recent election was held on 4 December 2021, and the makeup of the council is as follows:

Party	Councillors
Independents	10
Independent National	1
Total	10

== Past councillors ==
=== 2016−present ===
Year	Councillor	Councillor	Councillor	Councillor	Councillor	Councillor	Councillor	Councillor	Councillor	Councillor
2016	Neil Westcott (Ind.)	Louise O'Leary (Ind.)	Ken Keith (Ind. Nat)	Kenny McGrath (Ind.)	Wally Biles (Ind.)	Barbara Newton (Ind.)	George Pratt (Ind.)	Bill Jayet (Ind.)	Alan Ward (Ind.)	Patrica Smith (Ind.)
2021	Neil Westcott (Ind.)	Louise O'Leary (Ind.)	Ken Keith (Ind. Nat)	Kenny McGrath (Ind.)	Glenn Wilson (Ind.)	Marg Applebee (Ind.)	George Pratt (Ind.)	Bill Jayet (Ind.)	Jacob Cass (Ind.)	Daniel Weber (Ind.)

== Election results ==
=== 2024 ===
2024 New South Wales local elections: Parkes
Party	Candidate	Votes	%	±%
Independent	1. Matthew Scherer; 2. Andrew Wilkinson; 3. Ben Drabsch; 4. Jeff Powell; 5. Michael White; 6. Mick Ramsay			
Independent	1. Glenn Wilson; 2. Daniel Weber; 3. Erik Snyman; 4. Rob Bradley; 5. Tim Hall-Matthews; 6. Ray Johnson; 7. Nick Lees; 8. Justin Hill			
Independent	Marg Applebee			
Independent	Neil Hamilton			
Independent	Douglas Pout			
Libertarian	Samuel Jordan			
Independent	Alan Flavel			
Independent National	Ken Keith			
Independent	Kenny McGrath			
Independent	Graeme Hunter			
Independent	Louise O'Leary			
Independent National	Darren Stevenson			
Independent	Hamish Ritchie			
Independent	Irene Ridgeway			
Independent	Anthony Barrott			
Independent	Joy Paddison			
Independent	Jacob Cass			
Independent	Bill Jayet			
Independent	Neil Westcott			
Independent	George Pratt			
Total formal votes				
Informal votes				
Turnout				

=== 2021 ===
2021 New South Wales local elections: Parkes
Party	Candidate	Votes	%	±%
Independent	1. Glenn Wilson (elected); 2. Erik Snyman; 3. Matthew Scherer; 4. Daniel Weber (elected); 5. Peter Weber; 6. Ray Hodge	1,596	19.9	
Independent National	Ken Keith (elected)	1,172	14.6	
Independent	Louise O'Leary (elected)	786	9.8	
Independent	Neil Westcott (elected)	708	8.8	
Independent	Bill Jayet (elected)	707	8.8	
Independent	Jacob Cass (elected)	650	8.1	
Independent	Marg Applebee (elected)	573	7.1	
Independent	Kenny McGrath (elected)	496	6.2	
Independent	George Pratt (elected)	431	5.4	
Independent National	John Southon	332	4.1	
Independent	Johanne Burke	213	2.7	
Independent	Cathy Francis	160	2.0	
Independent	John Coulston	156	1.9	
Independent	Sean White	47	0.6	
Total formal votes		8,027	91.0	
Informal votes		797	9.0	
Turnout		8,824	83.8	
Party total votes
Independent		6,523	81.3	
Independent National		1,504	18.7	
Party total seats			Seats	±
Independent			9	
Independent			1	
