= 2018 Group 10 Rugby League season =

2018 Group 10 Rugby League
- Teams: 9
- Premiers: Bathurst Panthers (3rd title)
- Minor premiers: Cowra Magpies
- Matches played: 74
- Points scored: 3830

The 2018 Group 10 Rugby League season was the 72nd season of premier competition of rugby league in the Central West area of New South Wales. It was run under the auspices of the Country Rugby League. It was the sixth consecutive season to feature nine teams, after the re-admittance of the Blayney Bears in 2013.

Orange CYMS entered the season as defending champions, after defeating Oberon Tigers 23–22 in the 2017 premier league decider. CYMS rallied from 22–8 down with 20 minutes remaining to claim the one-point victory. On the back of off-season recruits which included former South Sydney, Manly and Newcastle forward Josh Starling, Oberon Tigers were labelled the early premiership favourites.

== Premier League season summary ==
Eighteen rounds were contested from April until August, resulting in the top of Cowra Magpies, Orange Hawks, Orange CYMS, Bathurst Panthers and Oberon Tigers. Cowra Magpies won their first minor premiership since 1996.

St Pat's played its first home game at the new Jack Arrow Sporting Complex on April 22, a 16–10 victory over Oberon Tigers. St Pat's originally left its spiritual home of Jack Arrow Oval, at the now Paddy's Hotel, at the end of the 2012 season. The club had been playing its home games at the Bathurst Sports Ground, next door to city rivals Panthers at Carrington Park.

Round 10 was cancelled after snow closed roads to Oberon on June 17. Roads between Oberon and Bathurst were closed on the day, meaning Cowra Magpies were unable to travel to Oberon for their match against the Tigers. Games could have been played in Mudgee, Orange and Bathurst but Group 10 officials were hesitant to find itself in a situation where some games could have been played and some couldn't. Rescheduled mid-week games were not possible, due to being a logistical nightmare. All matches were scrapped and one point was awarded each. Because Orange CYMS had bye that weekend, a decision was made to scrap bye points in the second half of the season, so Orange CYMS wouldn't receive an unfair advantage.

After 16 rounds, Orange Hawks looked likely to claim a first minor premiership since 2013 but after losing to Oberon Tigers 22–20 at Wade Park on August 5, Cowra Magpies jumped into first place after a massive 58–14 win over Mudgee Dragons at Sid Kallas Oval on the same day. Magpies won their final match of the home and away season, 34–16 against Lithgow Workies, to seal their first minor premiership since 1996.

Cowra captain Josh Rainbow was named the Group 10 player of the year on August 31, becoming just the fourth Cowra player to do so, the most recent Magpies player Dean Corrigan winning in 2009. Rainbow earned 17 votes, to finish ahead of Orange Hawks captain-coach Willie Heta with 14 and 2016 winner Jeremy Gordon with 11, Rainbow's teammate who won the award with Bathurst Panthers.

Teams

Club	Home ground	Coach	Captain	President
Bathurst Panthers	Carrington Park	Doug Hewitt	Doug Hewitt	Dennis Comerford
Bathurst St Patrick's	Jack Arrow Sporting Complex	Greg Behan	Greg Behan	David Chapman
Blayney Bears	King George Oval	Tim Mortimer	Tim Mortimer	
Cowra Magpies	Sid Kallis Oval	Steve Sutton	Josh Rainbow	Marc McLeish
Lithgow Workmen's Club	Tony Luchetti Showground	Graeme Osborne		Corey Osborne
Mudgee Dragons	Glen Willow	Ben Gregory		Jared Robinson
Oberon Tigers	Oberon Sports Ground	Luke Braninghan	Luke Braninghan	Ian Christie-Johnston
Orange CYMS	Wade Park	Mick Sullivan	Mick Sullivan	
Orange Hawks	Wade Park	Willie Heta	Willie Heta	

Ladder

Pos	Team	Pld	W	D	L	PF	PA	PD	Pts	Qualification or relegation
1	Cowra Magpies	16	12	1	3	489	276	+213	25	Qualified for the Group 10 Rugby League finals
2	Orange Hawks	16	11	2	3	502	330	+172	24	Qualified for the Group 10 Rugby League finals
3	Orange CYMS	16	11	1	4	524	330	+194	23	Qualified for the Group 10 Rugby League finals
4	Bathurst Panthers	16	10	2	4	400	286	+114	22	Qualified for the Group 10 Rugby League finals
5	Oberon Tigers	16	9	1	6	384	282	+102	19	Qualified for the Group 10 Rugby League finals
6	Bathurst St Patrick's	16	5	2	9	400	409	−9	12	
7	Mudgee Dragons	16	4	1	11	364	524	−160	9	
8	Lithgow Workmen's Club	16	2	1	13	280	492	−212	5	
9	Blayney Bears	16	2	1	13	242	620	−378	5	

Updated to match(es) played on unknown. Source:
Rules for classification: 1) points; 2) point difference; 3) number of points scored.

== Play-off bracket ==
The Group 10 Rugby League finals use the top five McIntyre system:

Qualifying/Elimination Final
2	Orange Hawks	22
3	Orange CYMS	12
4	Bathurst Panthers	22
5	Oberon Tigers	16

Major/Minor Semi-final
1	Cowra Magpies	26
Orange Hawks	24
Orange CYMS	20
Bathurst Panthers	21

Preliminary Final
Orange Hawks	22
Bathurst Panthers	38

Grand Final
Cowra Magpies	10
Bathurst Panthers	12

== Finals ==
Home	Score	Away	Match Information
Home	Score	Away	Date and Time	Venue	Referee
Qualifying Finals
Bathurst Panthers	22-16	Oberon Tigers	18 August 2018, 6:15pm	Carrington Park	TBA
Orange Hawks	22-12	Orange CYMS	19 August 2018, 2:15pm	Wade Park	TBA
Semi-finals
Orange CYMS	20-21	Bathurst Panthers	25 August 2018	Wade Park
Cowra Magpies	26–24	Orange Hawks	26 August 2018	Sid Kallas Oval	TBA
Preliminary Final
Orange Hawks	22–38	Bathurst Panthers	2 September 2018	Wade Park
Grand Final
Cowra Magpies	10–12	Bathurst Panthers	9 September 2018	Sid Kallas Oval

== Grand Final ==
Cowra Magpies	Position	Bathurst Panthers
Jeremy Gordon	FB	Josh Rivett
Caley Mok	WG	Andrew Mendes
Bradyn Cassidy	CE	Blake Lawson
Lee McClintock	CE	Jye Barrow
Zachary Browne	WG	Kade Barrow
Warren Williams	FE	Willie Wright
Joseph Bugg	HB	Doug Hewitt (c)
Zachary Starr	PR	Brent Seager
Benjamin John	HK	Nick Loader
Blake Tidswell	PR	Dane Thorogood
Jay McClintock	SR	Blake Seager
Josh Rainbow (c)	SR	Jack Siejka
Ron Lawrence	LK	Blake Hewitt
Ben Gunn	Bench	Jed Betts
William Ingram	Bench	Kara Rotarangi
Mitchell Browne	Bench	Luke Bain
John Grant	Bench	Trent Hotham
Josh Rainbow	Coach	Doug Hewitt

Cowra Magpies hosted its first grand final since 2014, where they lost 34–12 to Bathurst St Pat's. The match will also be Bathurst Panthers first Group 10 premier league grand final since 2007, when they defeated Lithgow Workies 24–4 at Carrington Park.

Cowra hooker and former St Pat's hooker Benji John opened the scoring from dummy-half and Lee McClintock finished off a sweeping play from left to right to give the hosts a 10–0 lead inside the opening 13 minutes.

It became an arm wrestle and Panthers hung in, determined not to concede again. It was in the 57th when the deadlock was broken with Panthers’ lock Blake Hewitt crashing over and Willie Wright converted to reduce the deficit to 10–6.

With minutes remaining, still trailing 10–6, Panthers winger Andrew Mendes scored the equaliser and Wright's opportunity arose. Having missed his aunty's wedding to play the grand final, Wright made sure he slotted it, and from his boot, he knew it was going over.

To make it even sweeter, the successful conversion was struck directly in front of the Panthers faithful on the eastern side of the ground. The victory marked Panthers’ first Group 10 premier league title since 2007.

Hewitt lifted the Western Challenge Cup soon after and Panthers powerhouse Brent Seager was presented the Dave Scott Medal for player of the match.

Bathurst Panthers 12 (Blake Hewitt, Andrew Mendes tries; Willie Wright 2 conversions)

Cowra Magpies 10 (Benji John, Lee McClintock tries; Caley Mok conversion)

== Top try-scorers ==
Rank	Player	Club	Tries
1	(Australia) Braydn Cassidy	Cowra Magpies	14
2	(Fiji) Josefa Lasagavibau	Orange CYMS	13
3	(Australia) Corin Smith	Mudgee Dragons	12
4	(Australia) Jordan Baker	Orange Hawks	11
5=	(Australia) Doug Hewitt	Bathurst Panthers	10
5=	(Australia) Ryan Griffin	Orange CYMS	10
5=	(Australia) Sam Dwyer	Bathurst St Pat's	10
8=	(Australia) Jack Beasley	Mudgee Dragons	9
8=	(Australia) Warren Williams	Cowra Magpies	9
10=	(Australia) Chanse Burgess	Mudgee Dragons	8
10=	(Australia) Nathan Orr	Mudgee Dragons	8
10=	(Australia) Travis Adelerhof	Orange CYMS	8

== Top point-scorers ==
Rank	Player	Club	Tries
1	(New Zealand) Willie Heta	Orange Hawks	96
2	(Australia) Jack Beasley	Mudgee Dragons	84
3	(Australia) Chris Grevsmuhl	Orange CYMS	72
4	(Australia) Caley Mok	Cowra Magpies	62
5	(Australia) Jeremy Gordon	Cowra Magpies	57
6=	(Australia) Braydn Cassidy	Cowra Magpies	56
6=	(Australia) Josh Howarth	Bathurst St Pat's	56
8	(Australia) Mitchell Evers	Blayney Bears	54
9	(Fiji) Josefa Lasagavibau	Orange CYMS	52
10	(Australia) Brock McGarity	Orange CYMS	50
