= 2017 Group 10 Rugby League season =

2017 Group 10 Rugby League
- Teams: 9
- Premiers: Orange CYMS (12th title)
- Minor premiers: Orange CYMS
- Matches played: 78
- Points scored: 4092

The 2017 Group 10 Rugby League season was the 71st season of the premier competition of rugby league in the Central West area of New South Wales in 2017. It was run under the auspices of the Country Rugby League. It was the fifth consecutive season to feature nine teams, after the re-admittance of the Blayney Bears in 2013.

Mudgee Dragons entered the season as defending champions, after defeating Orange CYMS 14-10 in the 2016 premier league decider. Dragons made the final from fifth position, their win over minor premiers CYMS causing a massive upset.

== Premier League season summary ==
Eighteen rounds were contested from April until August, resulting in the top of Orange CYMS, Bathurst Panthers, Oberon Tigers, Mudgee Dragons and Lithgow Workmen's Club.

Teams

Club	Home ground	Coach	Captain	President
Bathurst Panthers	Carrington Park			Dennis Comerford
Bathurst St Patrick's	Jack Arrow Sporting Complex			David Chapman
Blayney Bears	King George Oval			
Cowra Magpies	Sid Kallis Oval			
Lithgow Workmen's Club	Tony Luchetti Showground			
Mudgee Dragons	Glen Willow			
Oberon Tigers	Oberon Sports Ground	Luke Braninghan	Luke Braninghan	Ian Christie-Johnston
Orange CYMS	Wade Park	Mick Sullivan	Mick Sullivan	
Orange Hawks	Wade Park			

Ladder

	Team	Pld	W	D	L	B	PF	PA	PD	Pts
1	Orange CYMS	16	14	1	1	2	728	250	+478	33
2	Bathurst Panthers	16	14	1	1	2	670	230	+440	33
3	Oberon Tigers	16	10	0	6	2	358	334	+24	24
4	Mudgee Dragons	16	9	0	7	2	444	317	+127	22
5	Lithgow Workmen's Club	16	7	0	9	2	348	445	-97	18
6	Orange Hawks	16	6	1	9	2	486	577	-91	17
7	Cowra Magpies	16	6	0	10	2	321	494	-173	16
8	Bathurst St Patrick's	16	4	0	12	2	300	456	-156	12
9	Blayney Bears	16	0	1	15	2	196	712	-516	5

== Finals ==
The Group 10 Rugby League finals use the top five McIntyre system:

Qualifying/Elimination Final
2	Bathurst Panthers	16
3	Oberon Tigers	20
4	Mudgee Dragons	32
5	Lithgow Workmen's Club	0

Major/Minor Semi-final
1	Orange CYMS	30
Oberon Tigers	12
Bathurst Panthers	38
Mudgee Dragons	12

Preliminary Final
Oberon Tigers	24
Bathurst Panthers	12

Grand Final
Orange CYMS	23
Oberon Tigers	22

== Grand Final ==
Orange CYMS	Position	Oberon Tigers
Benjamin McAlpine	FB	Blake Fitzpatrick
Tom Satterthwaite	WG	Matt Ballinger
Joseph Lasagavibau	CE	Abel Faifua-Lefaoseu
Lachlan Munro	CE	Jackson Brien
Semis Tupou	WG	Tyler Hughes
Luke Petrie	FE	Luke Branighan (c)
Michael Sullivan (c)	HB	Anton Wereta
Cameron Jones	PR	David Sellers
Ryan Griffin	HK	Luke Carpenter
Christopher Bamford	PR	Jake Dawe
Joseph Duffy	SR	Tui Oloapu
Brenden Cousins	SR	Trent Rose
Robert Mortimer	LK	Matthew Wakefield
Sam Hill	Bench	Sione Fotu-Moala
Brock McGarity	Bench	Michael Ingwersen
Timothy Mortimer	Bench	Cody Godden
Dominic Maley	Bench	Nathan Booth
Michael Sullivan	Coach	Luke Branighan

Orange CYMS 23 (Tom Satterthwaite 3, Robert Mortimer, Sam Hill tries; Benjamin McAlphine conversion, Michael Sullivan field goal)

Oberon Tigers 22 (Tui Oloapu, Tyler Hughes, Luke Branighan, Luke Carpenter, Jackson Brien tries; Branighan conversion)
