= 2024 NSWRL Premiership Division =

Australian rugby league

The New South Wales Rugby League will oversee multiple competitions during the 2024 season, as part of the newly created Premiership Division. Presently, only two men's competitions are confirmed to be a part of the division. This division replaces the Presidents Cup. Both the Ron Massey Cup and Denton Engineering Cup will remain a part of the NSWRL Major Competitions.

== Harrigan Premiership ==
The Harrigan Premiership is the Wollongong men's first grade competition. Formerly a president's cup competition, it drops back into the premiership division for the 2024 season.

=== Teams ===
Colours	Club	Home ground(s)	Head coach
	Collegians Collie Dogs	Collegians Sports Stadium	TBA
	Corrimal Cougars	Ziems Park	TBA
	Dapto Canaries	Groundz Precinct	TBA
	De La Salle Caringbah	Captain Cook Oval	TBA
	Thirroul Butchers	Thomas Gibson Park	TBA
	Western Suburbs Red Devils	Sid Parish Park	TBA

=== Ladder ===
Pos	Team	Pld	W	D	L	B	PF	PA	PD	Pts
1	De La Salle Caringbah	15	10	2	3	1	416	270	+146	24
2	Western Suburbs Red Devils	15	8	3	4	1	394	262	+132	21
3	Thirroul Butchers	15	7	4	4	1	344	226	+118	20
4	Collegians Collie Dogs	15	7	2	6	1	332	350	–18	18
5	Dapto Canaries	15	4	3	8	1	292	382	–90	13
6	Corrimal Cougars	15	1	2	12	1	186	474	-288	6

Updated to match(es) played on 17 August. Source:
Rules for classification: 1) points; 2) point difference; 3) points scored

==== Ladder progression ====
- Numbers highlighted in green indicate that the team finished the round inside the top 4.
- Numbers highlighted in blue indicates the team finished first on the ladder in that round.
- Numbers highlighted in red indicates the team finished last place on the ladder in that round.
- Underlined numbers indicate that the team had a bye during that round.

Pos	Team	1	2	5	6	7	8	10	4	3	9	11	12	13	14	15	16
1	De La Salle Caringbah	2	4	6	6	8	10	14	14	15	15	16	18	18	20	22	24
2	Western Suburbs Red Devils	2	2	6	8	8	8	10	12	12	12	13	14	16	17	19	21
3	Thirroul Butchers	0	2	5	7	9	9	9	11	11	12	13	14	16	18	18	20
4	Collegians Collie Dogs	2	2	4	4	6	8	10	12	13	13	14	16	16	16	18	18
5	Dapto Canaries	0	0	3	5	5	7	9	9	9	10	11	11	13	13	13	13
6	Corrimal Cougars	0	2	4	4	4	4	4	4	4	4	5	5	5	6	6	6

=== Season results ===
Season Results:

Round 1

Home	Score	Away	Match Information
Home	Score	Away	Date and Time	Venue	Referee	Video
Dapto Canaries	22 – 28	Collegians Collie Dogs	Saturday, 20 April, 3:00pm	Groundz Precinct	Luke Mungovan
Thirroul Butchers	12 – 18	Western Suburbs Red Devils	Saturday, 20 April, 3:00pm	Thomas Gibson Park	Taylor Cleveland
Corrimal Cougars	4 – 36	De La Salle Caringbah	Saturday, 20 April, 3:00pm	Ziems Park	Darren Van De Moosdyk

Round 2

Home	Score	Away	Match Information
Home	Score	Away	Date and Time	Venue	Referee	Video
De La Salle Caringbah	40 – 16	Western Suburbs Red Devils	Saturday, 27 April, 3:00pm	Captain Cook Oval	Ben Sigmond
Thirroul Butchers	22 – 12	Collegians Collie Dogs	Saturday, 27 April, 3:00pm	Thomas Gibson Park	Luke Mungovan
Corrimal Cougars	16 – 10	Dapto Canaries	Sunday, 28 April, 3:00pm	Ziems Park	Darren Van De Moosdyk

Round 3

Home	Score	Away	Match Information
Home	Score	Away	Date and Time	Venue	Referee	Video
Dapto Canaries	16 – 16	Thirroul Butchers	Saturday, 4 May, 3:00pm	Groundz Precinct	Taylor Cleveland
Western Suburbs Red Devils	30 – 6	Corrimal Cougars	Saturday, 4 May, 3:00pm	Sid Parish Park	Michael Chin
Collegians Collie Dogs	20 – 20*	De La Salle Caringbah	N/A	N/A	N/A

Round 4

Home	Score	Away	Match Information
Home	Score	Away	Date and Time	Venue	Referee	Video
Collegians Collie Dogs	48 – 6	Corrimal Cougars	Saturday, 13 July, 3:00pm	Collegians Sports Stadium	William Damato
Western Suburbs Red Devils	44 – 26	Dapto Canaries	Saturday, 13 July, 3:00pm	Sid Parish Park	Luke Mungovan
Thirroul Butchers	24 – 22	De La Salle Caringbah	Saturday, 13 July, 3:00pm	Thomas Gibson Park	Taylor Cleveland

Round 5

Home	Score	Away	Match Information
Home	Score	Away	Date and Time	Venue	Referee
Collegians Collie Dogs	BYE	Corrimal Cougars
Dapto Canaries	BYE	Thirroul Butchers
Western Suburbs Red Devils	BYE	De La Salle Caringbah

Round 6

Home	Score	Away	Match Information
Home	Score	Away	Date and Time	Venue	Referee	Video
Dapto Canaries	28 – 18	De La Salle Caringbah	Saturday, 25 May, 3:00pm	Groundz Precinct	Taylor Cleveland
Western Suburbs Red Devils	34 – 10	Collegians Collie Dogs	Saturday, 25 May, 3:00pm	Sid Parish Park	Michael Chin
Thirroul Butchers	40 – 8	Corrimal Cougars	Saturday, 25 May, 3:00pm	Thomas Gibson Park	Will Damato

Round 7

Home	Score	Away	Match Information
Home	Score	Away	Date and Time	Venue	Referee	Video
Western Suburbs Red Devils	12 – 26	Thirroul Butchers	Saturday, 1 June, 3:00pm	Sid Parish Park	Taylor Cleveland
Corrimal Cougars	10 – 38	De La Salle Caringbah	Saturday, 1 June, 3:00pm	Ziems Park	Luke Mungovan
Collegians Collie Dogs	26 – 22	Dapto Canaries	Sunday, 2 June, 3:00pm	Collegians Sports Stadium	Will Damato

Round 8

Home	Score	Away	Match Information
Home	Score	Away	Date and Time	Venue	Referee	Video
Collegians Collie Dogs	20 – 12	Thirroul Butchers	Saturday, 15 June, 3:00pm	Collegians Sports Stadium	Michael Chin
Dapto Canaries	24 – 16	Corrimal Cougars	Saturday, 15 June, 3:00pm	Groundz Precinct	Ryan Micallef
Western Suburbs Red Devils	14 – 24	De La Salle Caringbah	Sunday, 16 June, 4:00pm	Noel Mulligan Oval	Harrison Buxton

Round 9

Home	Score	Away	Match Information
Home	Score	Away	Date and Time	Venue	Referee	Video
Collegians Collie Dogs	16 – 38	De La Salle Caringbah	Saturday, 22 June, 3:00pm	Collegians Sports Stadium	Michael Chin
Corrimal Cougars	0 – 44	Western Suburbs Red Devils	Saturday, 22 June, 3:00pm	Ziems Park	Taylor Cleveland
Thirroul Butchers	20 – 20*	Dapto Canaries	N/A	N/A	N/A

Round 10

Home	Score	Away	Match Information
Home	Score	Away	Date and Time	Venue	Referee	Video
De La Salle Caringbah	36 – 16	Thirroul Butchers	Saturday, 29 June, 3:00pm	Captain Cook Oval	Andrew Hutchinson
Dapto Canaries	28 – 16	Western Suburbs Red Devils	Saturday, 29 June, 3:00pm	Groundz Precinct	Luke Mungovan
Corrimal Cougars	24 – 28	Collegians Collie Dogs	Sunday, 30 June, 3:00pm	Ziems Park	Will Damato

Round 11

Home	Score	Away	Match Information
Home	Score	Away	Date and Time	Venue	Referee	Video
De La Salle Caringbah	20 – 20*	Dapto Canaries	N/A	N/A	N/A
Western Suburbs Red Devils	20 – 20*	Collegians Collie Dogs	N/A	N/A	N/A
Corrimal Cougars	20 – 20*	Thirroul Butchers	N/A	N/A	N/A

Round 12

Home	Score	Away	Match Information
Home	Score	Away	Date and Time	Venue	Referee	Video
De La Salle Caringbah	26 – 12	Corrimal Cougars	Saturday, 20 July, 3:00pm	Captain Cook Oval	Drew Blackman
Collegians Collie Dogs	22 – 10	Dapto Canaries	Saturday, 20 July, 3:00pm	Collegians Sports Stadium	Michael Chin
Thirroul Butchers	10 – 10	Western Suburbs Red Devils	Saturday, 20 July, 3:00pm	Thomas Gibson Park	Will Damato

Round 13

Home	Score	Away	Match Information
Home	Score	Away	Date and Time	Venue	Referee	Video
Dapto Canaries	44 – 22	Corrimal Cougars	Saturday, 27 July, 3:00pm	Groundz Precinct	Taylor Cleveland
Thirroul Butchers	36 – 4	Collegians Collie Dogs	Saturday, 27 July, 3:00pm	Thomas Gibson Park	Luke Mungovan
De La Salle Caringbah	6 – 34	Western Suburbs Red Devils	Saturday, 27 July, 3:20pm	Captain Cook Oval	Salvatore Marigliano

Round 14

Home	Score	Away	Match Information
Home	Score	Away	Date and Time	Venue	Referee	Video
De La Salle Caringbah	38 – 36	Collegians Collie Dogs	Saturday, 3 August, 12:50pm	Henson Park	Will Damato
Dapto Canaries	0 – 34	Thirroul Butchers	Saturday, 3 August, 3:00pm	Groundz Precinct	Michael Chin
Western Suburbs Red Devils	20 – 20*	Corrimal Cougars	N/A	N/A	N/A

Round 15

Home	Score	Away	Match Information
Home	Score	Away	Date and Time	Venue	Referee	Video
Dapto Canaries	12 – 44	Western Suburbs Red Devils	Saturday, 10 August, 3:00pm	Groundz Precinct	Luke Mungovan
Thirroul Butchers	10 – 14	De La Salle Caringbah	Saturday, 10 August, 3:00pm	Thomas Gibson Park	Taylor Cleveland
Corrimal Cougars	6 – 20	Collegians Collie Dogs	Saturday, 10 August, 3:00pm	Ziems Park	Michael Chin

Round 16

Home	Score	Away	Match Information
Home	Score	Away	Date and Time	Venue	Referee	Video
Collegians Collie Dogs	22 – 40	Western Suburbs Red Devils	Saturday, 17 August, 3:00pm	Collegians Sports Stadium	Michael Chin
Corrimal Cougars	16 – 46	Thirroul Butchers	Saturday, 17 August, 3:00pm	Ziems Park	Will Damato
De La Salle Caringbah	40 – 10	Dapto Canaries	Saturday, 17 August, 3:10pm	Captain Cook Oval	Cameron Hutchinson

=== Finals series ===
Minor & Major Semi-Finals
1	De La Salle	10
2	Western Suburbs	12
3	Thirroul	32
4	Collegians	18

Preliminary Final
1	De La Salle	4
3	Thirroul	29

Grand Final
2	Western Suburbs	31
3	Thirroul	20

Home	Score	Away	Match Information
Home	Score	Away	Date and Time	Venue	Referee	Video
Major & Minor Semi-Final
Thirroul Butchers	32 – 18	Collegians Collie Dogs	Saturday, 24 August, 3:00pm	Thomas Gibson Park	Michael Chin
De La Salle Caringbah	10 – 12	Western Suburbs Red Devils	Sunday, 25 August, 2:00pm	Forshaw Park	Taylor Cleveland
Preliminary Final
De La Salle Caringbah	4 – 29	Thirroul Butchers	Saturday, 31 August, 3:00pm	Collegians Sports Stadium	Michael Chin
Grand Final
Western Suburbs Red Devils	31 – 20	Thirroul Butchers	Sunday, 8 September, 3:00pm	WIN Stadium	Michael Chin

==== Grand Final ====
2024 Harrigan Premiership Grand Final

Sunday, 8 September
3:00pm (AEST)

Western Suburbs Red Devils	31 – 20	Thirroul Butchers
Tries: Dylan Lauri (21') 1 Colby Pellow (40') 1 Jy Hitchcox (44') 1 Kade Reed (60') 1 George Jennings (65') 1 Dylan Palmer-Quigg (79') 1 Goals: Dane Chisholm 3/6 (23', 61', 67'); Field goals: Dane Chisholm (76') 1	1st: 10 – 12; 2nd: 21 – 8	Tries: 1 (7') Tarje Whitford; 1 (12') Toby Huxley; 1 (70') Brad Deitz; Goals: 4/4 Josh Martin (9', 14', 51'p, 71')

WIN Stadium, Wollongong
Referee: Michael Chin
Player of the Match: Dane Chisholm

Team lists:

FB	1	Mitchell Porter
WG	2	Jy Hitchcox
CE	3	George Jennings
CE	4	Tautau Moga
WG	5	Colby Pellow
FE	6	Kade Reed
HB	7	Dane Chisholm
PR	8	Luke Chalker
HK	9	Joe Dickson
PR	10	Nathan Leatigaga
SR	11	Matt Delbanco
SR	12	Phoenix Vetenibua
LK	13	Levi Pascoe
Substitutes:
IC	14	Dylan Palmer-Quigg
IC	15	Justin Rodrigues
IC	16	Dylan Lauri
IC	17	Tristan Alvarado
Replacement:
RE	18	Zac Blay
Coach:
Peter McLeod

Officials:

Michael Chin (Referee)

Andrew Astill (Touch Judge)

Darren Van De Moosdyk (Touch Judge)

FB	1	Dane Courtney
WG	2	Josh Martin
CE	3	Jackson Shereb
CE	4	Nelson Sharp
WG	5	Bryden Rutledge
FE	6	Jarrod Boyle
HB	7	Tarje Whitford
PR	15	Ammon Cairney
HK	9	Brad Deitz
PR	19	Kristian Williams
SR	11	Hayden Crosland (c)
SR	12	Toby Huxley
LK	13	Tyrell Fuimaono
Substitutes:
IC	8	Sione Afemui
IC	14	Cooper Bennett
IC	16	Kaleb Hocking
IC	17	Marcus Moore
Replacement:
RE	18	Michael Mouawad
Coach:
Jarrod Costello

== Peter McDonald Premiership ==
The Peter McDonald Premiership is the Western Division men's first grade competition that features teams from the former Group 10 and Group 11 competitions. Formerly a president's cup competition, it drops back into the premiership division for the 2024 season.

=== Teams ===
Colours	Club	Home ground(s)	Head coach
	Bathurst Panthers	Carrington Park	TBA
	Bathurst St Patricks Saints	Jack Arrow Sporting Complex	TBA
	Dubbo CYMS Fishies	Apex Oval	TBA
	Dubbo Macquarie Raiders	Apex Oval	TBA
	Forbes Magpies	Spooner Oval	TBA
	Lithgow Workies Wolves	Tony Luchetti Sportsground	TBA
	Mudgee Dragons	Glen Willow Regional Sports Stadium	TBA
	Nyngan Tigers	Larkin Oval	TBA
	Orange CYMS	Wade Park	TBA
	Orange Hawks	Wade Park	TBA
	Parkes Spacemen	Pioneer Oval	TBA
	Wellington Cowboys	Kennard Park	TBA

=== Ladder ===
Pos	Team	Pld	W	D	L	B	PF	PA	PD	Pts
1	Mudgee Dragons	14	13	0	1	1	540	258	+282	28
2	Dubbo CYMS Fishies	14	11	0	3	1	396	260	+136	24
3	Parkes Spacemen	14	10	0	4	1	460	302	+158	22
4	Bathurst St Patricks Saints	14	8	2	4	1	301	280	+21	20
5	Bathurst Panthers	14	8	0	6	1	378	387	–9	18
6	Forbes Magpies	14	7	1	6	1	364	298	+66	17
7	Orange CYMS	14	7	0	7	1	357	298	+59	16
8	Wellington Cowboys	14	6	1	7	1	382	388	–6	13
9	Dubbo Macquarie Raiders	14	5	0	9	1	330	382	–52	12
10	Nyngan Tigers	14	3	0	11	1	266	472	-206	8
11	Lithgow Workies Wolves	14	2	0	12	1	254	467	-213	6
12	Orange Hawks	14	2	0	12	1	184	420	-236	4

Updated to match(es) played on 11 August. Source:
Rules for classification: 1) points; 2) point difference; 3) points scored

==== Ladder progression ====
- Numbers highlighted in green indicate that the team finished the round inside the top 8.
- Numbers highlighted in blue indicates the team finished first on the ladder in that round.
- Numbers highlighted in red indicates the team finished last place on the ladder in that round.
- Underlined numbers indicate that the team had a bye during that round.

Pos	Team	1	2	4	5	6	7	8	9	10	11	3	12	13	14	15
1	Mudgee Dragons	0	2	6	8	10	12	14	16	18	20	20	22	24	26	28
2	Dubbo CYMS Fishies	0	0	4	6	6	8	10	12	14	16	16	18	20	22	24
3	Parkes Spacemen	2	4	6	8	10	10	12	12	14	16	16	18	18	20	22
4	Bathurst St Patricks Saints	2	2	4	6	7	9	9	9	11	13	14	14	16	18	20
5	Bathurst Panthers	2	4	8	8	8	10	12	14	14	14	14	16	16	16	18
6	Forbes Magpies	2	2	4	6	7	9	11	11	11	11	11	11	13	15	17
7	Orange CYMS	2	4	6	8	8	10	12	14	14	16	16	16	16	16	16
8	Wellington Cowboys	2	4	4	4	4	6	6	8	10	10	11	11	11*	13	13
9	Dubbo Macquarie Raiders	2	2	4	4	6	8	8	8	10	12	12	12	12	12	12
10	Nyngan Tigers	0	0	0	0	2	4	4	6	6	6	6	8	8	8	8
11	Lithgow Workies Wolves	0	2	2	2	4	6	6	6	6	6	6	6	6	6	6
12	Orange Hawks	2	2	2	2	2	2*	2	2	2	2	2	4	4	4	4

- Orange Hawks were stripped two points for competition breaches
- Wellington Cowboys were stripped two points for competition breaches

Season Results:

Round 1

Home	Score	Away	Match Information
Home	Score	Away	Date and Time	Venue	Referee	Video
Orange CYMS	46 – 22	Mudgee Dragons	Saturday, 27 April, 3:30pm	Wade Park	Bryce Hotham
Dubbo CYMS Fishies	16 – 22	Dubbo Macquarie Raiders	Sunday, 28 April, 2:00pm	Apex Oval	Willy Barnes
Nyngan Tigers	22 – 34	Wellington Cowboys	Sunday, 28 April, 2:00pm	Larkin Oval	Justin Walker
Orange Hawks	26 – 4	Lithgow Workies Wolves	Sunday, 28 April, 2:00pm	Wade Park	Nicholas McGrath
Bathurst Panthers	24 – 36	Bathurst St Patricks Saints	Sunday, 28 April, 2:00pm	Carrington Park	Nicholas Lander
Forbes Magpies	BYE	Parkes Spacemen

Round 2

Home	Score	Away	Match Information
Home	Score	Away	Date and Time	Venue	Referee	Video
Lithgow Workies Wolves	28 – 16	Nyngan Tigers	Saturday, 4 May, 3:30pm	Tony Luchetti Sportsground	Anthony Pond
Bathurst Panthers	22 – 20	Dubbo CYMS Fishies	Sunday, 5 May, 2:00pm	Carrington Park	Bryce Hotham
Orange CYMS	18 – 12	Forbes Magpies	Sunday, 5 May, 2:00pm	Wade Park	Nicholas Lander
Parkes Spacemen	42 – 16	Bathurst St Patricks Saints	Sunday, 5 May, 2:00pm	Pioneer Oval	Willy Barnes
Wellington Cowboys	42 – 12	Orange Hawks	Sunday, 5 May, 2:00pm	Kennard Park	Michael Madgwick
Dubbo Macquarie Raiders	14 – 34	Mudgee Dragons	Sunday, 5 May, 2:30pm	Apex Oval	Justin Walker

Round 3

Home	Score	Away	Match Information
Home	Score	Away	Date and Time	Venue	Referee	Video
Nyngan Tigers	6 – 46	Orange CYMS	Saturday, 11 May, 3:30pm	Larkin Oval	Willy Barnes
Forbes Magpies	32 – 34	Bathurst Panthers	Sunday, 12 May, 2:00pm	Spooner Oval	Justin Walker
Mudgee Dragons	34 – 28	Parkes Spacemen	Sunday, 12 May, 2:00pm	Glen Willow Regional Sports Stadium	Anthony Pond
Orange Hawks	10 – 24	Dubbo CYMS Fishies	Sunday, 12 May, 2:00pm	Wade Park	Nicholas Lander
Dubbo Macquarie Raiders	46 – 10	Lithgow Workies Wolves	Sunday, 12 May, 2:30pm	Apex Oval	Michael Madgwick
Bathurst St Patricks Saints	0 – 0*	Wellington Cowboys	N/A	N/A	N/A

Round 4

Home	Score	Away	Match Information
Home	Score	Away	Date and Time	Venue	Referee	Video
Wellington Cowboys	28 – 30	Forbes Magpies	Sunday, 19 May, 2:00pm	Kennard Park	Willy Barnes
Dubbo CYMS Fishies	42 – 4	Nyngan Tigers	Sunday, 19 May, 2:00pm	Apex Oval	Shanika Harpur
Parkes Spacemen	28 – 24	Dubbo Macquarie Raiders	Sunday, 19 May, 2:00pm	Pioneer Oval	Justin Walker
Bathurst St Patricks Saints	36 – 14	Orange Hawks	Sunday, 19 May, 2:00pm	Jack Arrow Sporting Complex	Bryce Hotham
Lithgow Workies Wolves	6 – 44	Mudgee Dragons	Sunday, 19 May, 2:00pm	Tony Luchetti Sportsground	Nathan Blanchard
Orange CYMS	14 – 20	Bathurst Panthers	Sunday, 19 May, 2:00pm	Wade Park	Anthony Pond

Round 5

Home	Score	Away	Match Information
Home	Score	Away	Date and Time	Venue	Referee	Video
Orange Hawks	12 – 22	Orange CYMS	Sunday, 26 May, 2:00pm	Wade Park	Bryce Hotham
Bathurst Panthers	26 – 42	Mudgee Dragons	Sunday, 26 May, 2:00pm	Carrington Park	Willy Barnes
Lithgow Workies Wolves	22 – 34	Bathurst St Patricks Saints	Sunday, 26 May, 2:00pm	Tony Luchetti Sportsground	Anthony Pond
Forbes Magpies	34 – 18	Dubbo Macquarie Raiders	Sunday, 26 May, 2:00pm	Spooner Oval	Justin Walker
Nyngan Tigers	18 – 42	Parkes Spacemen	Sunday, 26 May, 2:00pm	Larkin Oval	Michael Madgwick
Dubbo CYMS Fishies	54 – 24	Wellington Cowboys	Sunday, 26 May, 2:00pm	Apex Oval	Nicholas Lander

Round 6

Home	Score	Away	Match Information
Home	Score	Away	Date and Time	Venue	Referee	Video
Bathurst St Patricks Saints	24 – 24	Forbes Magpies	Saturday, 1 June, 3:30pm	Jack Arrow Sporting Complex	Anthony Pond
Mudgee Dragons	68 – 6	Dubbo CYMS Fishies	Sunday, 2 June, 2:00pm	Glen Willow Regional Sports Stadium	Bryce Hotham
Parkes Spacemen	36 – 20	Orange CYMS	Sunday, 2 June, 2:00pm	Pioneer Oval	Willy Barnes
Wellington Cowboys	28 – 30	Lithgow Workies Wolves	Sunday, 2 June, 2:00pm	Kennard Park	Justin Walker
Orange Hawks	24 – 28	Nyngan Tigers	Sunday, 2 June, 2:00pm	Wade Park	Nicholas Lander
Dubbo Macquarie Raiders	22 – 18	Bathurst Panthers	Sunday, 2 June, 2:30pm	Apex Oval	Michael Madgwick

Round 7

Home	Score	Away	Match Information
Home	Score	Away	Date and Time	Venue	Referee	Video
Parkes Spacemen	18 – 22	Forbes Magpies	Sunday, 9 June, 2:00pm	Pioneer Oval	Liam Richardson
Dubbo Macquarie Raiders	BYE	Bathurst Panthers
Wellington Cowboys	BYE	Orange CYMS
Mudgee Dragons	BYE	Lithgow Workies Wolves
Bathurst St Patricks Saints	BYE	Dubbo CYMS Fishies
Orange Hawks	BYE	Nyngan Tigers

Round 8

Home	Score	Away	Match Information
Home	Score	Away	Date and Time	Venue	Referee	Video
Mudgee Dragons	36 – 10	Wellington Cowboys	Saturday, 15 June, 3:30pm	Glen Willow Regional Sports Stadium	Nicholas Lander
Bathurst Panthers	30 – 24	Nyngan Tigers	Sunday, 16 June, 2:00pm	Carrington Park	Nathan Blanchard
Orange CYMS	28 – 18	Dubbo Macquarie Raiders	Sunday, 16 June, 2:00pm	Wade Park	Shanika Harpur
Lithgow Workies Wolves	30 – 36	Parkes Spacemen	Sunday, 16 June, 2:00pm	Tony Luchetti Sportsground	Bryce Hotham
Dubbo CYMS Fishies	32 – 10	Bathurst St Patricks Saints	Sunday, 16 June, 2:00pm	Apex Oval	Simon Hartas
Forbes Magpies	40 – 6	Orange Hawks	Sunday, 16 June, 2:00pm	Spooner Oval	Justin Walker

Round 9

Home	Score	Away	Match Information
Home	Score	Away	Date and Time	Venue	Referee	Video
Wellington Cowboys	36 – 28	Dubbo Macquarie Raiders	Saturday, 22 June, 3:30pm	Kennard Park	Shanika Harpur
Dubbo CYMS Fishies	26 – 12	Parkes Spacemen	Sunday, 23 June, 2:00pm	Apex Oval	Justin Walker
Orange Hawks	16 – 34	Bathurst Panthers	Sunday, 23 June, 2:00pm	Wade Park	Nicholas Lander
Lithgow Workies Wolves	18 – 32	Orange CYMS	Sunday, 23 June, 2:00pm	Tony Luchetti Sportsground	James Fitzgerald
Bathurst St Patricks Saints	10 – 46	Mudgee Dragons	Sunday, 23 June, 2:00pm	Jack Arrow Sporting Complex	Anthony Pond
Nyngan Tigers	18 – 16	Forbes Magpies	Sunday, 23 June, 3:30pm	Larkin Oval	Stuart Duff

Round 10

Home	Score	Away	Match Information
Home	Score	Away	Date and Time	Venue	Referee	Video
Bathurst Panthers	12 – 46	Parkes Spacemen	Sunday, 30 June, 2:00pm	Carrington Park	Anthony Pond
Orange CYMS	20 – 30	Wellington Cowboys	Sunday, 30 June, 2:00pm	Wade Park	Bryce Hotham
Lithgow Workies Wolves	20 – 36	Dubbo CYMS Fishies	Sunday, 30 June, 2:00pm	Tony Luchetti Sportsground	Nicholas Lander
Forbes Magpies	16 – 22	Mudgee Dragons	Sunday, 30 June, 2:00pm	Spooner Oval	Justin Walker
Nyngan Tigers	10 – 34	Bathurst St Patricks Saints	Sunday, 30 June, 2:00pm	Larkin Oval	Shanika Harpur
Dubbo Macquarie Raiders	32 – 10	Orange Hawks	Sunday, 30 June, 2:30pm	Apex Oval	Stuart Duff

Round 11

Home	Score	Away	Match Information
Home	Score	Away	Date and Time	Venue	Referee	Video
Mudgee Dragons	36 – 32	Bathurst Panthers	Saturday, 6 July, 3:30pm	Glen Willow Regional Sports Stadium	Anthony Pond
Orange CYMS	34 – 22	Orange Hawks	Sunday, 7 July, 2:00pm	Wade Park	Nicholas Lander
Bathurst St Patricks Saints	17 – 16	Lithgow Workies Wolves	Sunday, 7 July, 2:00pm	Jack Arrow Sporting Complex	Bryce Hotham
Parkes Spacemen	34 – 20	Nyngan Tigers	Sunday, 14 July, 2:00pm	Pioneer Oval	Shanika Harpur
Wellington Cowboys	18 – 24	Dubbo CYMS Fishies	Sunday, 14 July, 2:00pm	Kennard Park	Justin Walker
Dubbo Macquarie Raiders	20 – 12	Forbes Magpies	Sunday, 14 July, 2:30pm	Apex Oval	Michael Madgwick

Round 12

Home	Score	Away	Match Information
Home	Score	Away	Date and Time	Venue	Referee	Video
Bathurst St Patricks Saints	8 – 22	Bathurst Panthers	Saturday, 20 July, 3:30pm	Jack Arrow Sporting Complex	Justin Walker
Dubbo CYMS Fishies	24 – 14	Forbes Magpies	Sunday, 21 July, 2:00pm	Apex Oval	Michael Madgwick
Parkes Spacemen	28 – 26	Wellington Cowboys	Sunday, 21 July, 2:00pm	Pioneer Oval	Nathan Blanchard
Nyngan Tigers	46 – 30	Dubbo Macquarie Raiders	Sunday, 21 July, 2:00pm	Larkin Oval	Shanika Harpur
Lithgow Workies Wolves	12 – 26	Orange Hawks	Sunday, 21 July, 2:00pm	Tony Luchetti Sportsground	Nicholas McGrath
Mudgee Dragons	44 – 30	Orange CYMS	Sunday, 21 July, 2:00pm	Glen Willow Regional Sports Stadium	Bryce Hotham

Round 13

Home	Score	Away	Match Information
Home	Score	Away	Date and Time	Venue	Referee	Video
Bathurst Panthers	44 – 22	Lithgow Workies Wolves	Saturday, 20 April, 11:00am	Carrington Park	Anthony Pond
Orange Hawks	6 – 28	Mudgee Dragons	Saturday, 27 July, 3:30pm	Wade Park	Nicholas Lander
Orange CYMS	8 – 12	Bathurst St Patricks Saints	Sunday, 28 July, 2:00pm	Wade Park	Bryce Hotham
Forbes Magpies	24 – 12	Parkes Spacemen	Sunday, 28 July, 2:00pm	Spooner Oval	Anthony Pond
Wellington Cowboys	28 – 22	Nyngan Tigers	Sunday, 28 July, 2:00pm	Kennard Park	Shanika Harpur
Dubbo Macquarie Raiders	4 – 32	Dubbo CYMS Fishies	Sunday, 28 July, 2:30pm	Apex Oval	Justin Walker

Round 14

Home	Score	Away	Match Information
Home	Score	Away	Date and Time	Venue	Referee	Video
Forbes Magpies	40 – 24	Lithgow Workies Wolves	Saturday, 3 August, 3:30pm	Spooner Oval	Bryce Hotham
Wellington Cowboys	46 – 34	Bathurst Panthers	Sunday, 4 August, 2:00pm	Kennard Park	Shanika Harpur
Dubbo CYMS Fishies	18 – 16	Orange CYMS	Sunday, 4 August, 2:00pm	Apex Oval	Justin Walker
Mudgee Dragons	42 – 16	Nyngan Tigers	Sunday, 4 August, 2:00pm	Glen Willow Regional Sports Stadium	Anthony Pond
Bathurst St Patricks Saints	44 – 20	Dubbo Macquarie Raiders	Sunday, 4 August, 2:00pm	Jack Arrow Sporting Complex	Nicholas Lander
Parkes Spacemen	64 – 0	Orange Hawks	Sunday, 4 August, 2:00pm	Pioneer Oval	Stuart Duff

Round 15

Home	Score	Away	Match Information
Home	Score	Away	Date and Time	Venue	Referee	Video
Orange Hawks	0 – 20*	Bathurst St Patricks Saints	Sunday, 11 August, 2:00pm	Wade Park	N/A
Mudgee Dragons	42 – 12	Lithgow Workies Wolves	Sunday, 11 August, 2:00pm	Glen Willow Regional Sports Stadium	Bryce Hotham
Bathurst Panthers	26 – 23	Orange CYMS	Sunday, 11 August, 2:00pm	Carrington Park	Nicholas Lander
Forbes Magpies	48 – 32	Wellington Cowboys	Sunday, 11 August, 2:00pm	Spooner Oval	Justin Walker
Nyngan Tigers	16 – 42	Dubbo CYMS Fishies	Sunday, 11 August, 2:00pm	Larkin Oval	Shanika Harpur
Dubbo Macquarie Raiders	30 – 34	Parkes Spacemen	Sunday, 11 August, 2:30pm	Apex Oval	Stuart Duff

=== Finals series ===
Qualifying / Elimination Finals
1	Mudgee	48
4	Bathurst	16
5	Bathurst	36
8	Wellington	38
6	Forbes	30
7	Orange	22
2	Dubbo	12
3	Parkes	32

Semi-Finals
4	Bathurst	28
8	Wellington	26
2	Dubbo	20
6	Forbes	18

Preliminary Finals
3	Parkes	54
4	Bathurst	18
1	Mudgee	29
2	Dubbo	22

Grand Final
1	Mudgee	46
3	Parkes	16

Home	Score	Away	Match Information
Home	Score	Away	Date and Time	Venue	Referee	Video
Qualifying & Elimination Finals
Mudgee Dragons	48 – 16	Bathurst St Patricks Saints	Saturday, 17 August, 3:30pm	Glen Willow Regional Sports Stadium	Bryce Hotham
Forbes Magpies	30 – 22	Orange CYMS	Saturday, 17 August, 3:30pm	Spooner Oval	Anthony Pond
Dubbo CYMS Fishies	12 – 32	Parkes Spacemen	Sunday, 18 August, 2:00pm	Apex Oval	Stuart Duff
Bathurst Panthers	36 – 38	Wellington Cowboys	Sunday, 18 August, 2:00pm	Carrington Park	Justin Walker
Semi-Finals
Dubbo CYMS Fishies	20 – 18	Forbes Magpies	Saturday, 24 August, 2:00pm	Apex Oval	Stuart Duff
Bathurst St Patricks Saints	28 – 26	Wellington Cowboys	Saturday, 24 August, 2:30pm	Jack Arrow Sporting Complex	Anthony Pond
Preliminary Finals
Mudgee Dragons	29 – 22	Dubbo CYMS Fishies	Sunday, 1 September, 2:00pm	Glen Willow Regional Sports Stadium	Anthony Pond
Parkes Spacemen	54 – 18	Bathurst St Patricks Saints	Sunday, 1 September, 2:00pm	Pioneer Oval	Stuart Duff
Grand Final
Mudgee Dragons	46 – 16	Parkes Spacemen	Sunday, 8 September, 3:00pm	Glen Willow Regional Sports Stadium	Anthony Pond

==== Grand Final ====
2024 Peter McDonald Premiership Grand Final

Sunday, 8 September
3:00pm (AEST)

Mudgee Dragons	46 – 16	Parkes Spacemen
Tries: Ethan Pegus (24', 70') 2 Camden Sutton (12', 46') 2 Cody Godden (3') 1 David West (21') 1 Jake Durrant (41') 1 Chad Chandler (52') 1 Thomas Lawson (58') 1 Nathan Orr (74') 1 Goals: Thomas Lawson 2/3 (72', 75'); Billy Carberry 1/6 (25'); Nathan Orr 0/1	1st: 18 – 12; 2nd: 28 – 4	Tries: 2 (8', 39') Jacob Smede; 1 (64') Fiohira Faingaa; Goals: 2/3 Chad Porter (9', 40')

Glen Willow Regional Sports Stadium, Mudgee
Referee: Anthony Pond
Player of the Match: Clay Priest

Team lists:

FB	1	Nathan Orr
WG	2	Ethan Pegus
CE	3	David West
CE	4	Camden Sutton
WG	5	Jake Durrant
FE	6	Jack Littlejohn
HB	7	Thomas Lawson
PR	8	Nick Bligh
HK	9	Jack Beasley
PR	10	Luke Moody
SR	11	Billy Carberry
SR	12	Cody Godden
LK	13	Clay Priest (c)
Substitutes:
IC	14	Ben Thompson
IC	15	Chad Chandler
IC	16	Ryan O'Connor
IC	17	Hayden Carpenter
Coach:
Clay Priest

Officials:

Anthony Pond (Referee)

Bryce Hotham (Touch Judge)

Nicholas Lander (Touch Judge)

Nicholas McGrath (In-Goal Judge)

Justin Walker (In-Goal Judge)

FB	1	Sam Dwyer
WG	2	Malakai Folau
CE	3	Tuhi Pompey
CE	4	Fiohira Faingaa
WG	5	Jacob Smede
FE	6	Aria Cerei
HB	7	Chad Porter (c)
PR	8	Jordan Pope
HK	9	Joseph Dwyer
PR	10	Nikola Sovatabua
SR	11	Riley Scott
SR	12	Brandon Paige
LK	13	Jake Porter
Substitutes:
IC	14	Cody Crisp
IC	15	Eddy Perramond
IC	16	Jake Hutchings
IC	17	Ryan Goodsell
Coach:
Chad Porter
