= Group 10 Rugby League =

Rugby league competition

- Sport: Rugby league
- Instituted: 1947
- Inaugural season: 1947
- Ceased: 2021
- Replaced by: Western Premiership
- Country: Australia
- Most recent premiers: Bathurst Panthers (2019)
- Most titles: Orange CYMS (12 titles)
- Website: Group 10 Homepage

Group 10 is a rugby league competition in the Central West area of New South Wales, under the auspices of the New South Wales Rugby League. It had been under the control of Country Rugby League but that changed after the NSWRL agreed to a new constitution and the CRL voted to wind up its affairs immediately. The decisions was made on 19 October 2019 and the merger means that the aim of a unified administration of the sport in NSW was achieved over a year ahead of time.

Ahead of the 2022 season, the Group 10 and Group 11 competitions merged to form the Western Premiership.

== Origin and formation ==
At the end of the 1946 representative campaign, it was Bathurst that was crowned Western Challenge Cup premiers after finishing ahead of Lithgow, Orange and Oberon in the four-team group. The team's 7–0 win against Oberon in the final match of the round-robin competition in August at the Bathurst Sportsground saw the team finish the campaign undefeated.

Group 10 would meet two months later but Group 10 secretary Harley Brazil put forward a radical proposal, which alter the future of rugby league in the Central West region. Brazil put forward a "scheme" for an inter-town competition, with a goal to kick off in 1947. Brazil's idea was to see the leading eight teams in the Group (Bathurst Railway, Bathurst Waratahs, Lithgow Small Arms Factory, Lithgow Western Suburbs, Oberon, Orange Our Boys, Orange Waratahs and Portland) participate in the competition.

When the districts met in February, not everyone accepted Brazil's proposal, which become referred to as the 'Brazil plan' by the local press. Representatives from Bathurst, Orange, Lithgow, Mudgee, Oberon, Blayney and Portland would debate over three proposals for several hours. The three proposals mentioned in the Lithgow Mercury on 26 February 1947 included:

- The 'Brazil plan': The leading clubs from the major districts competing in an inter-town club competition.
- The 'Bathurst proposal': An inter-district competition with games played every two weeks, to permit the local competitions to be played on alternative weeks. Winners of the inter-district competition would receive a prize of £100 and the Western Challenge Cup.
- The 'Orange proposal': Rugby league would conduct the same way it was in the 1946 season, with the Western Challenge Cup to be played for at least every three weeks.

Ultimately, it was the 'Brazil plan' that was adopted by 10 votes to eight but it was quickly followed by opposition from Orange and Bathurst.

Issues continued and by Group 10's annual general meeting on 16 March, tensions reached boiling point between Orange and Bathurst and the other leagues. According to the Lithgow Mercury, Bathurst and Orange were granted permission to conduct their own competitions, independent of the new inter-town club tournament.

Brazil's plan for a new inter-town club competition was thrown into turmoil, with only four teams nominating, well below the secretary's eight-team dream. At the Group's meeting on 7 April, only Lithgow Small Arms Factory, Lithgow Western Suburbs, Oberon Tigers and Portland Colts had put their hands up for the new competition.

The first ever games in Group 10 had been locked in for Sunday, 13 April. Wests would play Oberon in Lithgow, while Portland would host Factory. Both games would kick-off at 3.15pm, with curtain-raisers the local Lithgow first grade competition games. Match reports in the Lithgow Mercury indicate Wests overcame the Tigers 17–3. C. Hallam scored the first try for Wests, which may have been the first ever try scored in the competition. In the other match, Portland downed Factory 14–7. Factory won the inaugural premiership by defeating Portland 17–7 in the grand final.

== Overview ==
The current season format consists of fourteen rounds, with each team playing each other twice. The top five teams then play-off to the McIntyre final five system, culminating in the grand final which is held at the home ground of the major semi-final winner.

Former NRL players to play in Group 10 in recent times include Luke Branighan (Oberon and Bathurst St Patrick's) and Josh Starling (Oberon and Bathurst Panthers), with the latter signing on for the Panthers ahead of the 2020 season. Former Manly forward George Rose played one season for Oberon in 2016. NSW legend Mark O'Meley played a one-off game for St Pat's in 2016. Mick Sullivan has been one of the most influential ex-NRL players in recent times, leading Orange CYMS to five premierships during his nine-season stint between 2010 and 2018, a record haul for a captain-coach in the competition's history.

== Current clubs and location ==
From 2023, all four grades of Group 10 Clubs play in the Peter McDonald Premiership alongside Group 11 Rugby League clubs. Although a Group 10 Premier is still crowned in all grades, with this being the best team in the Group 10 Pool of the Peter McDonald Premiership. In 2022, Group 10 still officially fielded Reserve and women's League Tag competitions while the First Grade and Under 18s competitions were run as the Peter McDonald Premiership.

Locations of the current Group 10 clubs.

Club	Home Ground	PMP	Winners	Runners-up	Years won	Years runner-up
Bathurst Panthers	Carrington Park	Yes	4	3	2006, 2007, 2018, 2019	2000, 2004, 2005
Bathurst St Patrick's	Jack Arrow Sporting Complex	Yes	6	2	1968, 1973, 1989, 2001, 2008, 2014	1953, 1982
Lithgow Workmen's Club	Tony Luchetti Showground	Yes	4	18	1960, 1991, 2005, 2012	1957, 1959, 1961, 1962, 1963, 1964, 1965, 1972, 1976, 1978, 1988, 1990, 1998, 2006, 2007, 2009, 2011, 2015
Mudgee Dragons	Glen Willow	Yes	8	8	1986, 2000, 2002, 2004, 2009, 2016, 2022, 2023	1984, 1985, 1987, 2001, 2003, 2008, 2010, 2019
Orange CYMS	Wade Park	Yes	12	7	1952, 1953, 1954, 1958, 1959, 1987, 1988, 2010, 2011, 2013, 2015, 2017	1950, 1951, 1956, 2002, 2012, 2016, 2022
Orange Hawks	Wade Park	Yes	3	7	1955, 1999, 2003	1969, 1973, 1974, 1975, 1997, 2013, 2023

== Junior Clubs ==
- Bathurst Panthers
- Bathurst St Patrick's
- Blayney Bears
- Bloomfield Tigers (Feeder club for Orange Hawks)
- Cowra Magpies
- Eglington Eels Bathurst (No seniors)
- Lithgow Storm
- Mudgee Dragons
- Oberon Tigers (Seniors play in Woodbridge Cup)
- Orange CYMS
- Wallerawang Warriors (No seniors)

== Previous clubs ==
Club	Winners	Runners-up	Years won	Years runners-up	Status	Last season
Bathurst Charlestons	1	4	1979	1948, 1952, 1966, 1967	Amalgamated with Bathurst Leagues Club to form Bathurst Penguins in 1990.	1989
Bathurst Penguins	2	3	1994, 1997	1991, 1992, 1995	Amalgamated with Penrith Panthers Leagues Club to form Bathurst Panthers in 2000.	1999
Bathurst Railway	9	0	1948, 1949, 1950, 1957, 1972, 1974, 1976, 1980, 1981		Disbanded	1993
Bathurst Waratahs	0	0			Disbanded	1952
Blayney Bears	5	3	1977, 1990, 1993, 1996, 1998	1986, 1994, 1999	Woodbridge Cup	2023
Cowra Magpies	4	11	1978, 1983, 1992, 1995	1955, 1970, 1971, 1977, 1979, 1980, 1989, 1993, 1996, 2014, 2018	Woodbridge Cup	2023
Glen Davis	0	0			Disbanded	1950
Kandos Waratahs	0	0			Mid West Cup	1975
Katoomba	0	0			Disbanded	1962
Lithgow East Diggers	1	0	1951		Disbanded	1954
Lithgow Shamrocks	3	2	1982, 1984, 1985	1981, 1983	Disbanded	1994
Lithgow Small Arms Factory	2	2	1947, 1956	1949, 1954	Disbanded	1965
Lithgow State Mine	0	0			Disbanded	1956
Lithgow St Patrick's	0	0			Disbanded	1955
Lithgow Western Suburbs	0	0			Disbanded	1951
Millthorpe	0	0			Disbanded	1948
Oberon Tigers	11	4	1961, 1962, 1963, 1964, 1965, 1966, 1967, 1969, 1970, 1971, 1975	1958, 1960, 1968, 2017	Woodbridge Cup	2019
Orange Aces	0	0			Disbanded	1953
Orange Our Boys	0	0			Disbanded	1954
Orange Rovers	0	0			Disbanded	1950
Orange Waratahs	0	0			Disbanded	1949
Portland Colts	0	1		1947	Mid West Cup	1974
Wallerawang Warriors	0	0			Mid West Cup	1961

== Past premiers ==
=== Group 10 (1947-2021) ===
- Between 1948 and 1951, Group 10 was split into a Western Zone and an Eastern Zone, with the top teams from each zone crossing over to contest a finals series.

Season	Champion	Score	Runners-Up	Grand final venue	Minor premiers	Wooden Spoon	Teams
1947	Lithgow Small Arms Factory	17–7	Portland Colts	Lithgow Showground, Lithgow	Portland Colts	Oberon Tigers	4
1948	Bathurst Railway (Note: Bathurst Railway also finished the season undefeated.)	8–6	Bathurst Charlestons	Lithgow Showground, Lithgow	Bathurst Railway (West); Portland Colts (East)	Blayney Bears (West); Glen Davis (East)	10 (West) (Note: Millthorpe withdrew after two rounds and its record was expunged. The club is still included in the total tally of competing teams.); 8 (East)
1949	Bathurst Railway (Note: Bathurst Railway also finished the season undefeated.)	6–4	Lithgow Small Arms Factory	Lithgow Showground, Lithgow	Bathurst Railway (West); Lithgow Small Arms Factory (East)	Bathurst Waratahs (West); Kandos Waratahs (East)	7 (West); 7 (East)
1950	Bathurst Railway (Note: Bathurst Railway also won the Clayton Cup.)	9–8	Orange CYMS	Bathurst Sportsground, Bathurst	Bathurst Charlestons (West); Lithgow East Diggers (East)	Bathurst Waratahs; Glen Davis (East)	8 (West) (Note: Orange Rovers withdrew after one round and its record was expunged. The club is still included in the total tally of competing teams.); 8 (East)
1951	Lithgow East Diggers	17–4	Orange CYMS	Bathurst Sportsground, Bathurst	Bathurst Railway (West); Lithgow East Diggers (East)	Blayney Bears (West); Lithgow Western Suburbs (East)	6 (West); 7 (East) (Note: Oberon Tigers withdrew after three rounds and its record was expunged. The club is still included in the total tally of competing teams.)
1952	Orange CYMS	14–2	Bathurst Charlestons	Wade Park, Orange	Orange CYMS	Bathurst St Patrick's	10 (Note: Bathurst Waratahs withdrew after two rounds and its record was expunged. The club is still included in the total tally of competing teams.)
1953	Orange CYMS	9–8	Bathurst St Patrick's	Bathurst Sportsground, Bathurst	Orange CYMS	Orange Aces	9
1954	Orange CYMS (Note: Orange CYMS also won the Clayton Cup.)	7–2	Lithgow Small Arms Factory	Bathurst Sportsground, Bathurst	Orange CYMS	Oberon Tigers	9
1955	Orange Emmco	13–10	Cowra Magpies	Bathurst Sportsground, Bathurst	Cowra Magpies; Orange CYMS; Orange Emmco	Bathurst Charlestons	10
1956	Lithgow Small Arms Factory	10–4	Orange CYMS	Bathurst Sportsground, Bathurst	Lithgow Small Arms Factory	Lithgow State Mine	10
1957	Bathurst Railway	27–14	Lithgow Workmen's Club	Lithgow Showground, Lithgow	Lithgow Workmen's Club	Orange Emmco	9 (Note: Wallerawang Warriors withdrew after 14 rounds and its record was expunged. The club is still included in the total tally of competing teams.)
1958	Orange CYMS	17–6	Oberon Tigers	Bathurst Sportsground, Bathurst	Orange CYMS	Bathurst Charlestons	10
1959	Orange CYMS	5–4	Lithgow Workmen's Club	Bathurst Sportsground, Bathurst	Oberon Tigers	Blayney Bears	11
1960	Lithgow Workmen's Club	12–11	Oberon Tigers	Bathurst Sportsground, Bathurst	Lithgow Workmen's Club	Lithgow Small Arms Factory	11
1961	Oberon Tigers	22–7	Lithgow Workmen's Club	Bathurst Sportsground, Bathurst	Bathurst Railway	Lithgow Small Arms Factory	11 (Note: Wallerawang Warriors withdrew after seven rounds and its record was expunged. The club is still included in the total tally of competing teams.)
1962	Oberon Tigers	14–7	Lithgow Workmen's Club	Wade Park, Orange	Oberon Tigers	Katoomba	10
1963	Oberon Tigers	23–2	Lithgow Workmen's Club	Bathurst Sportsground, Bathurst	Oberon Tigers	Lithgow Small Arms Factory	9
1964	Oberon Tigers (Note: Oberon Tigers also won the Clayton Cup.)	30–2	Lithgow Workmen's Club	Bathurst Sportsground, Bathurst	Oberon Tigers	Lithgow Small Arms Factory	9
1965	Oberon Tigers	29–5	Lithgow Workmen's Club	Wade Park, Orange	Bathurst St Patrick's	Lithgow Small Arms Factory	9
1966	Oberon Tigers	23–10	Bathurst Charlestons	Bathurst Sportsground, Bathurst	Oberon Tigers	Lithgow Shamrocks	9
1967	Oberon Tigers	23–2	Bathurst Charlestons	Bathurst Sportsground, Bathurst	Oberon Tigers	Lithgow Shamrocks	9
1968	Bathurst St Patrick's	9–8	Oberon Tigers	Bathurst Sportsground, Bathurst	Orange Ex-Services	Cowra Magpies	10
1969	Oberon Tigers	7–3	Orange Ex-Services	Bathurst Sportsground, Bathurst	Orange Ex-Services	Portland Colts	10
1970	Oberon Tigers	7–6	Cowra Magpies	Bathurst Sportsground, Bathurst	Cowra Magpies	Bathurst Charlestons	10
1971	Oberon Tigers	12–5	Cowra Magpies	Bathurst Sportsground, Bathurst	Cowra Magpies	Bathurst Charlestons	10
1972	Bathurst Railway	14–5	Lithgow Workmen's Club	Lithgow Showground, Lithgow	Orange Ex-Services	Bathurst Charlestons	10
1973	Bathurst St Patrick's	20–14	Orange Ex-Services	Bathurst Sportsground, Bathurst	Bathurst St Patrick's	Lithgow Shamrocks	10
1974	Bathurst Railway	12–11	Orange Ex-Services	Bathurst Sportsground, Bathurst	Orange Ex-Services	Portland Colts	11
1975	Oberon Tigers	17–4	Orange Ex-Services	Bathurst Sportsground, Bathurst	Oberon Tigers	Kandos Waratahs	11
1976	Bathurst Railway	21–14	Lithgow Workmen's Club	Bathurst Sportsground, Bathurst	Oberon Tigers	Orange CYMS	10
1977	Blayney Bears	7–6	Cowra Magpies	West Cowra Oval, Cowra	Lithgow Workmen's Club	Orange CYMS	10
1978	Cowra Magpies	12–9	Lithgow Workmen's Club	Lithgow Showground, Lithgow	Mudgee Dragons	Orange Ex-Services	11
1979	Bathurst Charlestons	11–9	Cowra Magpies	Bathurst Sportsground, Bathurst	Mudgee Dragons	Lithgow Shamrocks	11
1980	Bathurst Railway	14–6	Cowra Magpies	Bathurst Sportsground, Bathurst	Cowra Magpies	Bathurst St Patrick's	11
1981	Bathurst Railway	19–16	Lithgow Shamrocks	Bathurst Sportsground, Bathurst	Lithgow Shamrocks	Mudgee Dragons	11
1982	Lithgow Shamrocks	16–15	Bathurst St Patrick's	Lithgow Showground, Lithgow	Lithgow Shamrocks	Blayney Bears	11
1983	Cowra Magpies	31–8	Lithgow Shamrocks	West Cowra Oval, Cowra	Lithgow Shamrocks	Bathurst Charlestons	11
1984	Lithgow Shamrocks	19–12	Mudgee Dragons	Lithgow Showground, Lithgow	Lithgow Shamrocks	Bathurst Charlestons	11
1985	Lithgow Shamrocks	47–8	Mudgee Dragons	Lithgow Showground, Lithgow	Lithgow Shamrocks	Cowra Magpies	11
1986	Mudgee Dragons	16–14	Blayney Bears	Jubilee Oval, Mudgee	Mudgee Dragons	Oberon Tigers	11
1987	Orange CYMS	18–9	Mudgee Dragons	Wade Park, Orange	Mudgee Dragons	Oberon Tigers	11
1988	Orange CYMS	20–19	Lithgow Workmen's Club	Wade Park, Orange	Orange CYMS	Bathurst Charlestons	11
1989	Bathurst St Patrick's	31–14	Cowra Magpies	St Patrick's Sportsground, Bathurst	Bathurst St Patrick's	Bathurst Charlestons	11
1990	Blayney Bears	29–10	Lithgow Workmen's Club	King George Oval, Blayney	Blayney Bears	Oberon Tigers	11
1991	Lithgow Workmen's Club	22–13 (replay)	Bathurst Penguins	Wade Park, Orange	Lithgow Workmen's Club	Bathurst Railway	11
1992	Cowra Magpies	16–6	Bathurst Penguins	West Cowra Oval, Cowra	Cowra Magpies	Lithgow Shamrocks	11
1993	Blayney Bears	54–28	Cowra Magpies	King George Oval, Blayney	Bathurst Penguins	Orange United	11
1994	Bathurst Penguins	16–12 (extra-time)	Blayney Bears	King George Oval, Blayney	Blayney Bears	Orange United	10
1995	Cowra Magpies	19–16	Bathurst Penguins	Carrington Park, Bathurst	Bathurst Penguins	Bathurst St Patrick's	8
1996	Blayney Bears	34–23	Cowra Magpies	West Cowra Oval, Cowra	Cowra Magpies	Oberon Tigers	9
1997	Bathurst Penguins	12–9 (extra-time)	Orange Hawks	Wade Park, Orange	Orange Hawks	Orange CYMS	8
1998	Blayney Bears	29–18	Lithgow Workmen's Club	King George Oval, Blayney	Orange Hawks	Orange CYMS	8
1999	Orange Hawks	30–16	Blayney Bears	King George Oval, Blayney	Orange Hawks	Lithgow Workmen's Club	8
2000	Mudgee Dragons	34–12	Bathurst Panthers	Carrington Park, Bathurst	Bathurst Panthers	Orange Hawks	8
2001	Bathurst St Patrick's	28–6	Mudgee Dragons	Carrington Park, Bathurst	Mudgee Dragons	Cowra Magpies	7
2002	Mudgee Dragons	28–24	Orange CYMS	Jubilee Oval, Mudgee	Mudgee Dragons	Orange Hawks	7
2003	Orange Hawks	34–30	Mudgee Dragons	Jubilee Oval, Mudgee	Mudgee Dragons	Cowra Magpies	7
2004	Mudgee Dragons	17–10	Bathurst Panthers	Carrington Park, Bathurst	Bathurst Panthers	Cowra Magpies	6
2005	Lithgow Workmen's Club	19–4	Bathurst Panthers	Tony Luchetti Showground, Lithgow	Lithgow Workmen's Club	Oberon Tigers	8
2006	Bathurst Panthers	10–4 (extra-time)	Lithgow Workmen's Club	Tony Luchetti Showground, Lithgow	Lithgow Workmen's Club	Orange Hawks	8
2007	Bathurst Panthers	24–4	Lithgow Workmen's Club	Carrington Park, Bathurst	Bathurst Panthers	Oberon Tigers	8
2008	Bathurst St Patrick's	19–12	Mudgee Dragons	Carrington Park, Bathurst	Bathurst St Patrick's	Cowra Magpies	8
2009	Mudgee Dragons	32–29	Lithgow Workmen's Club	Jubilee Oval, Mudgee	Mudgee Dragons	Orange Hawks	7
2010	Orange CYMS	23–16	Mudgee Dragons	Wade Park, Orange	Orange CYMS	Bathurst Panthers	7
2011	Orange CYMS	30–12	Lithgow Workmen's Club	Endeavour Oval, Orange	Lithgow Workmen's Club	Bathurst St Patrick's	7
2012	Lithgow Workmen's Club	40–14	Orange CYMS	Tony Luchetti Showground, Lithgow	Lithgow Workmen's Club	Bathurst Panthers	8
2013	Orange CYMS	22–14	Orange Hawks	Wade Park, Orange	Orange Hawks	Blayney Bears	9
2014	Bathurst St Patrick's	34–12	Cowra Magpies	Sid Kallas Oval, Cowra	Bathurst St Patrick's	Blayney Bears	9
2015	Orange CYMS	14–10	Lithgow Workmen's Club	Wade Park, Orange	Orange CYMS	Oberon Tigers	9
2016	Mudgee Dragons	14–10	Orange CYMS	Wade Park, Orange	Orange CYMS	Lithgow Workmen's Club	9
2017	Orange CYMS	23–22	Oberon Tigers	Wade Park, Orange	Orange CYMS	Blayney Bears	9
2018	Bathurst Panthers	12–10	Cowra Magpies	Sid Kallas Oval, Cowra	Cowra Magpies	Blayney Bears	9
2019	Bathurst Panthers	9–8 (extra-time)	Mudgee Dragons	Carrington Park, Bathurst	Orange Hawks	Blayney Bears	9
2020	Season cancelled due to the COVID-19 pandemic.						
2021	Season abandon before finals could be played due to the COVID-19 pandemic.				Orange CYMS	Lithgow Workmen's Club (Note: Lithgow Workmen's Club could no longer play after round nine due to affects from the COVID-19 pandemic lockdown in Sydney)	6

- 1991 finished in a 16-all draw with no points scored in extra-time. Replay was required.

== Lower grades ==
=== First Division/Reserve Grade ===
- 1952 Wallerawang Warriors
- 1953
- 1954 Bathurst Charlestons
- 1955 Cowra Magpies
- 1956 Orange CYMS
- 1957 Lithgow Small Arms Factory
- 1958 Orange Emmco
- 1959 Orange Emmco
- 1960 Orange Emmco
- 1961 Orange CYMS
- 1962 Oberon Tigers
- 1963 Lithgow Workmen's Club
- 1964 Lithgow Workmen's Club
- 1965 Orange CYMS
- 1966 Oberon Tigers
- 1967 Orange CYMS
- 1968 Lithgow Workmen's Club
- 1969 Orange Ex-Services
- 1970 Bathurst Railway
- 1971 Bathurst Railway
- 1972 Lithgow Workmen's Club
- 1973 Orange Ex-Services
- 1974 Orange Ex-Services
- 1975 Oberon Tigers
- 1976 Oberon Tigers
- 1977 Orange Ex-Services
- 1978 Blayney Bears
- 1979 Cowra Magpies
- 1980 Bathurst Charlestons
- 1981 Bathurst Railway
- 1982 Mudgee Dragons
- 1983 Cowra Magpies
- 1984 Bathurst Charlestons
- 1985 Orange United
- 1986 Mudgee Dragons
- 1987 Blayney Bears
- 1988 Bathurst St Patrick's
- 1989 Bathurst St Patrick's
- 1990 Bathurst Penguins
- 1991 Orange United
- 1992 Cowra Magpies
- 1993 Bathurst Penguins
- 1994 Bathurst Penguins
- 1995 Cowra Magpies
- 1996 Bathurst Railway
- 1997 Orange CYMS
- 1998 Cowra Magpies
- 1999 Blayney Bears
- 2000 Bathurst Panthers
- 2001 Bathurst St Patrick's
- 2002 Bathurst Panthers
- 2003 Bathurst Panthers
- 2004 Bathurst St Patrick's
- 2005 Cowra Magpies
- 2006 Cowra Magpies
- 2007 Bathurst Panthers
- 2008 Bathurst Panthers
- 2009 Cowra Magpies
- 2010 Bathurst St Patrick's
- 2011 Bathurst Panthers
- 2012 Mudgee Dragons
- 2013 Bathurst Panthers
- 2014 Orange CYMS
- 2015 Orange CYMS
- 2016 Bathurst Panthers
- 2017 Lithgow Workmen's Club
- 2018 Bathurst St Patrick's
- 2019 Lithgow Workmen's Club
- 2022 Bathurst Panthers
- 2023 Cowra Magpies

=== Under 18s ===
- 1954 Bathurst St Patrick's
- 1955
- 1956 Orange CYMS
- 1957
- 1958
- 1959
- 1960 Cowra Magpies
- 1961 Bathurst St Patrick's
- 1962 Orange CYMS
- 1963
- 1964 Lithgow Shamrocks
- 1965 Bathurst St Patrick's
- 1966 Lithgow Workmen's Club
- 1967 Orange CYMS
- 1968 Cowra Magpies
- 1969 Bathurst St Patrick's
- 1970 Cowra Magpies
- 1971 Orange Ex-Services
- 1972 Oberon Tigers
- 1973 Bathurst Charlestons
- 1974 Cowra Magpies
- 1975 Cowra Magpies
- 1976 Orange CYMS
- 1977 Bathurst St Patrick's
- 1978 Bathurst Charlestons
- 1979 Cowra Magpies
- 1980 Orange CYMS
- 1981 Orange CYMS
- 1982 Bathurst Railway
- 1983 Blayney Bears
- 1984 Bathurst Railway
- 1985 Cowra Magpies
- 1986 Lithgow Workmen's Club
- 1987 Mudgee Dragons
- 1988 Mudgee Dragons
- 1989 Oberon Tigers
- 1990 Orange CYMS
- 1991 Orange CYMS
- 1992 Bathurst Penguins
- 1993 Mudgee Dragons
- 1994 Cowra Magpies
- 1995 Orange Hawks
- 1996 Orange Hawks
- 1997 Orange CYMS
- 1998 Mudgee Dragons
- 1999 Mudgee Dragons
- 2000 Bathurst Panthers
- 2001 Bathurst Panthers
- 2002 Orange CYMS
- 2003 Cowra Magpies
- 2004 Cowra Magpies
- 2005 Bathurst Panthers
- 2006 Cowra Magpies
- 2007 Orange CYMS
- 2008 Mudgee Dragons
- 2009 Bathurst St Patrick's
- 2010 Bathurst Panthers
- 2011 Bathurst Panthers
- 2012 Bathurst St Patrick's
- 2013 Cowra Magpies
- 2014 Orange Hawks
- 2015 Orange Hawks
- 2016 Lithgow Workmen's Club
- 2017 Orange CYMS
- 2018 Bathurst Panthers
- 2019 Bathurst St Patrick's
- 2020-21: No Premiers - COVID-19 pandemic
- 2022: Nyngan Tigers (Group 11)
- 2023 Orange Hawks

=== Women's League Tag ===
- 2012 Bathurst St Patrick's
- 2013 Bathurst Panthers
- 2014 Bathurst Panthers
- 2015 Bathurst St Patrick's
- 2016 Blayney Bears
- 2017 Bathurst St Patrick's
- 2018 Bathurst St Patrick's
- 2019 Bathurst St Patrick's
- 2022 Bathurst St Patrick's
- 2023 Bathurst St Patrick's

=== Under 18s League Tag ===
- 2018 Orange Hawks
- 2019 Orange Hawks

== See also ==
- Rugby League Competitions in Australia
- Mid West Cup
- Woodbridge Cup
