= 2020 Group 10 Rugby League season =

2020 Group 10 Rugby League
- Teams: 8

The 2020 Group 10 Rugby League season would have been the 74th season of Group 10 Rugby League, the premier rugby league competition in the Central West area of New South Wales. It would have been the first season the competition will be run under the auspices of New South Wales Rugby League, after NSWRL agreed to a new constitution and the Country Rugby League voted to wind up its affairs immediately. The decision was made on 19 October 2019 and the merger means that the aim of a unified administration of the sport in NSW was achieved over a year ahead of time. The Group 10 season was officially cancelled due to the COVID-19 pandemic on 9 June 2020.

The season would have been the first time since 2013 that there would have been a change in competing teams, with the competition planning to drop down to eight teams after Oberon Tigers withdrew due to a lack of numbers. Mudgee Dragons also sought a potential move to Group 11 Rugby League in the off-season, but decided not to nominate at the competition's annual general meeting in November, 2019.
