= Western Premiership (rugby league) =

Australian Rugby League competition

Peter McDonald Premiership
- Sport: Rugby league
- Inaugural season: 2022
- Number of teams: 12
- Region: Central West and Orana (NSWRL)
- Premiers: Forbes Magpies (2026)
- Most titles: Dubbo CYMS & Forbes (2 titles)
- Website: Play Rugby League.com
- Broadcast partner: BarTV
- Related competition: Group 10 Rugby League; Group 11 Rugby League

The Western Premiership (also known as the Peter McDonald Premiership due to the name of its First Grade competition) is a New South Wales, Australia rugby league competition. The competition commenced in 2022 and incorporates the former Group 10 and Group 11 competitions.

The competition is named in honour of the late Peter 'Ace' McDonald, a long-time Cowra Magpies, Group 10, Western Division and Country Rugby League administrator, and is played in four grades, these being First-Grade, Reserve-Grade, Under 18s and Ladies League Tag.

== History ==
The competition is the result of a merger between the historic Group 10 and Group 11 Rugby League competitions.

The competition was founded in 2022 after a series of strategic meetings with Group 10 and 11 clubs conducted by the NSWRL.

The competition initially only had First Grade and Under 18s, with respective reserves and women's tag competitions remaining under the control of Group 10 and Group 11. However, the competition will feature all four grades from 2023, as clubs wanted a full consistent matchday.

Initially, the competition also had two conferences, and implemented a first past the post system to award the historic Group 10 and 11 titles to the clubs who finished first on the ladder the respective historic competitions, however the conference system was scrapped in favour of a single league system from 2024 onwards.

Initially, the First Grade premiers progressed to the two week state NSWRL Presidents Cup finals against the Northern (Newcastle), Southern (Illawarra) and Ron Massey Cup (Sydney) conferences to crown the state semi-professional club champions, however this was scrapped after the 2023 season.

== Clubs ==
12 clubs compete in the Peter McDonald Premiership. All clubs field all grades.

=== Current clubs ===
Club	Moniker	Group	Home ground	Premierships	Premiership Years
First Grade
Bathurst	Panthers	Group 10	Carrington Park, Bathurst	0	None
Bathurst St Patrick's	St Pat's	Group 10	Jack Arrow Sporting Complex, Bathurst	0	None
Dubbo CYMS	Fishies	Group 11	Apex Oval, Dubbo	2	2023, 2025
Dubbo Macquarie	Raiders	Group 11	Apex Oval, Dubbo	0	None
Forbes	Magpies	Group 11	Spooner Park, Forbes	2	2022, 2026
Lithgow Workmen's Club	Wolves	Group 10	Tony Luchetti Showground, Lithgow	0	None
Mudgee	Dragons	Group 10	Glen Willow Oval, Mudgee	1	2024
Nyngan	Tigers	Group 11	Larkin Oval, Nyngan	0	None
Orange CYMS	CYMS	Group 10	Wade Park, Orange	0	None
Orange	Hawks	Group 10	Wade Park, Orange	0	None
Parkes	Spacemen	Group 11	Pioneer Oval, Parkes	0	None
Wellington	Cowboys	Group 11	Kennard Park, Wellington	0	None

=== Former clubs ===
Town	Team	Home ground	Conference	Premierships	Premiership Years
Blayney	Bears	King George Oval	Group 10	0	None
Cowra	Magpies	Sid Kallas Oval	Group 10	0	None

== Grand Finals ==
=== Peter McDonald Premiership (First Grade) ===
Year	Premiers	Score	Runner-up	Venue	Scott Weir Medal	Minor Premiers
2022	Forbes	28-16	Dubbo CYMS	Apex Oval, Dubbo	Mitch Andrews (Forbes)	Mudgee (Group 10) / Dubbo CYMS (Group 11)
2023	Dubbo CYMS	25-12	Mudgee	Apex Oval, Dubbo	Jarryn Powyer (Dubbo CYMS)	Mudgee (Group 10) / Dubbo CYMS (Group 11)
2024	Mudgee	46-16	Parkes	Glen Willow Oval, Mudgee	Clay Priest (Mudgee)	Mudgee
2025	Dubbo CYMS	23-22	Forbes	Apex Oval, Dubbo	Jeremy Thurston (Dubbo CYMS)	Dubbo CYMS
2026	Forbes	36-16	Dubbo CYMS	Spooner Oval, Forbes	Mitch Andrews (Forbes)	Mudgee

=== eserve Grade ===
Year	Premiers	Score	Runner-up	Venue	Minor Premiers
2022	Bathurst Panthers	29-24	Dubbo CYMS	Apex Oval, Dubbo	Bathurst Panthers (Group 10) / Dubbo CYMS (Group 11)
2023	Dubbo CYMS	32-22	Cowra	Apex Oval, Dubbo	Cowra (Group 10) / Dubbo CYMS (Group 11)
2024	Dubbo CYMS	18-10	Mudgee	Glen Willow Oval, Mudgee	Dubbo CYMS
2025	Nyngan	16-8	Dubbo Macquarie	Apex Oval, Dubbo	Dubbo CYMS
2026	Forbes	18-6	Mudgee	Spooner Oval, Forbes	Dubbo Macquarie

=== Western Premiership - League Tag ===
Year	Premiers	Score	Runner-up	Venue	Minor Premiers
2022	Bathurst St Patrick's	28-0	Dubbo CYMS	Apex Oval, Dubbo	Bathurst St Patrick's (Group 10) / Dubbo CYMS (Group 11)
2023	Bathurst St Patrick's	32-8	Dubbo Macquarie	Apex Oval, Dubbo	Bathurst St Patrick's (Group 10) / Dubbo CYMS (Group 11)
2024	Dubbo Macquarie	18-6	Bathurst St Patrick's	Glen Willow Oval, Mudgee	Dubbo Macqurarie
2025	Dubbo Macquarie	14-12	Dubbo CYMS	Apex Oval, Dubbo	Bathurst St Patrick's
2026	Orange CYMS	18-10	Forbes	Spooner Oval, Forbes	Orange CYMS

=== Tom Nelson Under 18s Premiership ===
Year	Premiers	Score	Runner-up	Venue	Minor Premiers
2022	Nyngan	26-12	Bathurst St Patrick's	Apex Oval, Dubbo	
2023	Orange Hawks	42-14	Lithgow	Apex Oval, Dubbo	Orange Hawks (Group 10) / Dubbo CYMS
2024	Orange Hawks	22-8	Dubbo CYMS	Glen Willow Oval, Mudgee	Orange Hawks
2025	Dubbo CYMS	34-8	Bathurst Panthers	Apex Oval, Dubbo	Dubbo CYMS
2026	Bathurst Panthers	18-16	Forbes	Spooners Oval, Forbes	Bathurst Panthers

== Western Women's Rugby League ==
The Western Women's Rugby League (WWRL) is a post-season women's tackle competition contested in the Central West. It features teams from the Peter McDonald Premiership, and their affiliates (in the case of Orange and Panorama), as well as representative sides from other Western Division competitions such as the Castlereagh League and Woodbridge Cup.

=== Clubs ===
Current	Town	Team	Home ground	Titles	Premiership Years
No	Castlereagh	Cougars	Coonamble Sports Ground		
No	Lachlan District	Lachlan	Pioneer Oval, Parkes		
Yes	Mudgee	Dragons	Glen Willow Sports Stadium		
No	Orange	Vipers	Pride Park, Waratah Sports Ground	1	2020
No	Panorama	Platypi	Jack Arrow Sporting Complex	5	2022 (summer), 2022 (spring), 2023, 2024, 2025
No	Wiradjuri	Goannas	Kennard Park, Wellington		
No	Woodbridge	Cup	Henry Lawson Oval, Grenfell		
Yes	Orange	Cyms	Wade Park, Orange	1	2026
Yes	Forbes	Magpies	Spooners Oval, Forbes		
Yes	Dubbo	Cyms	Apex Oval, Dubbo		

== PMP Graduates ==
Nyngan

- Fletcher Hunt (2024- Newcastle Knights)

== Other Notabale players ==
Bathurst Panther

- Grant Garvey (2016 Sydney Roosters)

Bathurst St Pat's

Dubbo CYMS

Dubbo Macquarie

- Justin Carney (2008-10 Canberra Raiders) (2011-12 Sydney Roosters)

Forbes

- Pio Seci (2022 Manly Warringah Sea Eagles)
- Alvin Maungaati (2023 Cook Islands)

Lithgow

- Kadiyae Ioka (2023 Cook Islands)

Mudgee

- Clay Priest (2016-17 Canberra Raiders) (2018Canterbury-Bankstown Bulldogs)
- Jack Littlejohn (2014 Manly Warringah Sea Eagles) (2016-17 Wests Tigers)
- Zac Saddler (2021 Manly Warringah Sea Eagles)
- Anthony Cherrington (2008-12 Sydney Roosters) (2017 South Sydney Rabbitohs)

Nyngan

- Vincent Leuluai (2016 Sydney Roosters) (2017Melbourne Storm)
- Constantine Mika (2009-11 Newcastle Knights)

Orange CYMS

- Jack Buchanan (2013-16 Wests Tigers)
- Daniel Mortimer (2009-11 Parramatta Eels) (2012-14Sydney Roosters) (2014-16 Gold Coast Titans) (2017Cronulla-Sutherland Sharks)
- Blake Ferguson (2009-10 Cronulla-Sutherland Sharks) (2011-13 Canberra Raiders) (2015-18 Sydney Roosters) (2019-21 Parramatta Eels)

Orange Hawks

Parkes Spacemen

- Jack Buchanan (2013-16 Wests Tigers)
- Tikiko Noke (2015 Fiji)

Wellington

- Blake Ferguson (2009-10 Cronulla-Sutherland Sharks) (2011-13 Canberra Raiders) (2015-18 Sydney Roosters) (2019-21 Parramatta Eels)
