= Mid West Cup =

Rugby competition

- Sport: Rugby league
- Instituted: 1913
- Inaugural season: 1913
- Ceased: 2021
- Re-formed: 2022
- Country: Australia
- Most recent premier: Blackheath Blackcats (2023)
- Most titles: Carcoar Crows (13 titles)
- Website: Group 10 Homepage

The Mid West Community Cup is a rugby league competition in the Central West area of New South Wales. The premiers are awarded the Blayney Citizens' Cup, the oldest continuously awarded trophy in Country Rugby League, with Neville the first recipients in 1913. For all intents and purposes, it is a third division competition in the Group 10/11 area.

In its last season under its original model in 2021, the competition encompassed teams from Bathurst, Kandos, Lithgow, Oberon, Orange and Portland. Some of the remaining clubs in the competition merged into the Woodbridge Cup in 2022 after two incomplete seasons due to the COVID-19 Pandemic. However, the competition reformed in late 2022 under a new community cup model similar to Group 17. The three clubs that emerged from the ailing original format of the competition to join the Woodbridge Cup did not rejoin the competition as they sought a higher standard of football, paving the way for the return of other older clubs.

== Current clubs ==
Three clubs are currently listed as part of the Mid West Community Cup competition. The inaugural edition of the competition ran as a four-team single round-robin with finals to follow, with a total four week season in 2022 and in 2023. The competition expanded to seven teams for 2024.

Club	City/Town	Home Ground	No. of Titles	Premierships
Blackheath Blackcats	Blackheath	Jubilee Park	10	1980, 1986, 1989, 1990, 1992, 1993, 2002, 2005, 2015, 2018, 2023
Carcoar Crows	Carcoar	Carcoar Oval	13	1931, 1949, 1950, 1966, 1967, 1968, 1969, 1971, 1973, 1982, 1985, 1988, 1994, 2022
Kandos Waratahs	Kandos	Waratah Park	7	1972, 1974, 1978, 1979, 1981, 2009, 2013
Portland Colts	Portland	Kremer Park	3	1984, 1998, 2008
Rockley Bulls	Rockley	Rockley Sports Ground	1	1956
Wallerawang Warriors	Wallerawang	Wallerawang Oval	6	1976, 1977, 1991, 2000, 2001, 2017
Woodstock Panthers	Woodstock	Woodstock Showground	1	1983

== Former clubs ==
=== 2021 Season teams ===
Seven teams will compete in the 2024 season including former Group 10 side Oberon Tigers, with the women's grade having six teams (Kandos being the extra). The teams were:

Club	City/Town	Home Ground	No. of Titles	Premierships	Notes
CSU Mungoes	Bathurst	Diggings Oval	5	1975, 2012, 2014, 2019, 2021	Joined Woodbridge Cup
Kandos Waratahs‡	Kandos	Waratah Park	7	1972, 1974, 1978, 1979, 1981, 2009, 2013	Competed in League Tag only, joined new Community Cup
Lithgow Bears	Lithgow	Tony Luchetti Showground	2	2010, 2011	Disbanded
Oberon Tigers	Oberon	Oberon Sports Ground	2	2003, 2020	Joined Woodbridge Cup
Portland Colts‡	Portland	Kremer Park	3	1984, 1998, 2008	Joined new Community Cup
Orange United Warriors	Orange	Wade Park	0	N/A	Joined Woodbridge Cup

‡ indicates active participant in the Mid West Community Cup

=== Former Teams (1913–2022) ===
More than 40 teams have reportedly featured in the Mid West Cup over the course of its history. They include:

Club	No. of Premierships	Premiership Years	Moved to
Barry	1	1932	Amalgamated with Neville
Barry-Neville	2	1952, 1953	Disbanded
Binnaway Bombshells	0	NA	Castlereagh Cup
Burrangong Bears	0	None	Disbanded
Blayney Bears	3	1922, 1970, 2006	Group 10 Rugby League
Blayney Blues	1	1923	Disbanded
Blayney Institute	1	1948	Disbanded
Blayney Militia	2	1924, 1925	Disbanded
Blayney Waratahs	2	1926	Disbanded
Browns Creek	2	1927, 1928	Disbanded
Canobolas	0	NA	Disbanded
Coolah Kangaroos	0	NA	Group 14 Rugby League
Cullen Bullen	0	NA	Disbanded
Dunedoo Swans	0	NA	Castlereagh Cup
Gulgong Terriers	5	1987, 1997, 1999, 2004, 2007	Castlereagh Cup
Mandurama	1	1918	NA
Manildra Rhinos	0	NA	Woodbridge Cup
Merriwa Magpies	0	NA	Group 14 Rugby League
Mitchell College	1	1975	Disbanded
Mudgee Tigers	1	1996	Disbanded
Millthorpe	1	1951	Disbanded
Neville	1	1913	Amalgamated with Barry
Newbridge	1	1914	Disbanded
Orange Barbarians	0	NA	Disbanded
Orange Old Boys/Our Boys	0	NA	Disbanded
Villages United	1	2015	Disbanded

== History ==
The Mid West Cup was originally organised as a rugby union competition but made the switch to rugby league after the First World War. The first winner of the competition was Neville and the club awarded the Blayney Citizens' Cup, the oldest trophy still in regular use in Country Rugby League.

While the competition was traditionally based in around the Blayney region, in the 1950s it expanded into Rockley, Carcoar and Cullen Bullen before it was absorbed in the Group 10 Rugby League and renamed the Group 10 Second Division in 1970. It adopted its current name of the Mid West Cup in 1990. The competition only featured four teams in 2019, including CSU Mungoes, Lithgow Bears, Orange Barbarians and Portland Colts, but expanded to eight in 2020 with the inclusion of the reformed Blackheath Blackcats and Kandos Waratahs, Oberon Tigers (who have been relegated from Group 10) and the newly formed Orange United.

The competition's last season under its original model was in 2021, and encompassed teams from Bathurst, Kandos, Lithgow, Oberon, Orange and Portland. The three remaining clubs in the competition (CSU, Oberon and Orange United) merged into the Woodbridge Cup in 2022 after two incomplete seasons due to the COVID-19 Pandemic. However, the competition reformed in late 2022 under a new community cup model similar to Group 17. The three clubs that emerged from the ailing original format of the competition to join the Woodbridge Cup did not rejoin the competition as they sought a higher standard of football, paving the way for the return of other older clubs such as Carcoar, as well as the introduction of Burrangong for the first time. Burrangong returned to the George Tooke Shield for 2023, with Blackheath rejoining the competition in their place.

== Premierships ==
- 1913: Neville
- 1914: Newbridge
- 1918: Mandurama
- 1922: Blayney Bears
- 1923: Blayney Blues
- 1924: Blayney Milita
- 1925: Blayney Milita
- 1926: Blayney Waratahs
- 1927: Browns Creek
- 1928: Browns Creek
- 1931: Carcoar
- 1932: Barry
- 1948: Blayney Institute
- 1949: Carcoar
- 1950: Carcoar
- 1951: Milthorpe
- 1952: Barry-Neville
- 1953: Barry-Neville
- 1956: Rockley
- 1957: Carcoar
- 1958: Carcoar
- 1959: Carcoar
- 1960: Carcoar
- 1961: Cullen Bullen
- 1962: Carcoar
- 1966: Carcoar
- 1967: Carcoar
- 1968: Carcoar
- 1969: Carcoar
- 1970: Blayney Bears
- 1971: Carcoar
- 1972: Kandos
- 1973: Carcoar
- 1974: Kandos
- 1975: Mitchell College
- 1976: Wallerawang
- 1977: Wallerawang
- 1978: Rylstone-Kandos
- 1979: Rylstone-Kandos
- 1980: Blackheath
- 1981: Rylstone-Kandos
- 1982: Carcoar
- 1983: Woodstock
- 1984: Portland
- 1985: Carcoar
- 1986: Blackheath
- 1987: Gulgong
- 1988: Carcoar
- 1989: Blackheath
- 1990: Blackheath
- 1991: Wallerawang
- 1992: Blackheath
- 1993: Blackheath
- 1994: Carcoar
- 1995: Lithgow Bears
- 1996: Mudgee
- 1997: Gulgong
- 1998: Portland
- 1999: Gulgong
- 2000: Wallerawang
- 2001: Wallerawang
- 2002: Blackheath
- 2003: Oberon
- 2004: Gulgong
- 2005: Blackheath
- 2006: Blayney Bears
- 2007: Gulgong
- 2008: Portland
- 2009: Kandos
- 2010: Lithgow Bears
- 2011: Lithgow Bears
- 2012: CSU Blue
- 2013: Kandos
- 2014: CSU Yellow
- 2015: Blackheath
- 2016: Villages United
- 2017: Wallerawang
- 2018: Blackheath
- 2019: CSU
- 2020: Oberon
- 2021: CSU
- 2022: Carcoar

== Grand final results (1970-2024) ==
Season	Premiers	Score	Runners-up	Grand final host	Minor premiers	Teams
Group 10 Second Division era.
1970	Blayney		Carcoar			
1971	Carcoar		Blayney			
1972	Kandos	18–8	Molong	Redmond Oval, Millthorpe	Kandos	7
1973	Carcoar	10–9	Kandos	Redmond Oval, Millthorpe	Carcoar	7
1974	Kandos	17–10	Wallerawang	Wallerawang Sportsground, Wallerawang	Kandos	6
1975	Mitchell College		Portland			
1976	Wallerawang		Rockley	2BOD, Bathurst	Wallerawang	
1977	Wallerawang	10–6	Canobolas	Bathurst Sportsground, Bathurst	Canobolas	12
1978	Rylstone	22–10	Canobolas			11
1979	Rylstone	34–18 (A.E.T.)	Blackheath	Lithgow Sportsground, Lithgow		
1980	Blackheath	16–3	Rylstone	Kremer Park, Portland	Rylstone	
1981	Rylstone	19–0	Carcoar	Wallerawang Sportsground, Wallerawang		
1982	Carcoar	22–14	Portland			11
1983	Woodstock	14–12	Blackheath	Redmond Oval, Millthorpe		
1984	Portland	23–12	Lithgow Bears			9
1985	Carcoar					
1986	Blackheath	20–6	Lithgow Bears			9
1987	Gulgong		Kandos		Gulgong	
1988	Carcoar		Canobolas			
1989	Blackheath	26–8	Orange Old Boys	Blackheath		9
1990	Blackheath		Orange Old Boys			
1991	Wallerawang	16–12	Blackheath			
1992	Blackheath		Gulgong			
1993	Blackheath	16–14	Portland			
1994	Carcoar	20–16	Blackheath			
1995	Lithgow Bears	8–2	Blackheath			16
1996	Mudgee Tigers					
1997	Gulgong		Lithgow Bears			
1998	Portland	40–28	Binnaway			
1999	Gulgong	19–18	Lithgow Bears			
2000	Wallerawang					
2001	Wallerawang					
2002	Blackheath					
2003	Oberon					
2004	Gulgong					
2005	Blackheath	18–17	Lithgow Bears			6
2006	Blayney	32–6	Lithgow Bears	Tony Luchetti Sportsground, Lithgow	Lithgow Bears	7
2007	Gulgong	36–18	Lithgow Bears	Billy Dunn Oval, Gulgong	Gulgong	6
2008	Portland	26–20	Oberon	Oberon Sportsground, Oberon		7
2009	Kandos	50–0	Lithgow Bears	Waratah Park, Kandos	Kandos	7
2010						
2011	Lithgow Bears		Kandos	Tony Luchetti Sportsground, Lithgow		
2012						
2013	Kandos	46–18	CSU Yellow	Waratah Park, Kandos		
2014	CSU Yellow	22–10	Blackheath	Diggings Oval, Bathurst		
2015				Wallerawang Sportsground, Wallerawang		
2016	Villages United	12–8	Blackheath	Jack Arrow Oval, Bathurst		
2017	Wallerawang	28–18	CSU			
2018	Blackheath					
2019	CSU	30–0	Orange Barbarians			
2020	Oberon	23–10	CSU	Carrington Park, Bathurst		
2021	CSU	24–16	Orange United	Diggings Oval, Bathurst		
Competition reverts to Community Cup model.
2022	Carcoar					
2023	Blackheath	34–26	Kandos	Carcoar Showground, Carcoar		
2024	Blackheath	20–0	Carcoar	Blackheath Oval, Blackheath		
2025	Rockley		Blackheath	Rockley Sportsground, Rockley	Rockley	8
2026	Rockley	12–10	Koorawatha	Waratah Park, Kandos	Koorawatha	8

== See also ==
- Rugby League Competitions in Australia
