= Over the Black Dot =

- Genre: Sports / Variety
- Presented by: Jodan Perry (2017–present); Dean Widders (2017–present); Bo De La Cruz (2017–present); Timana Tahu (2017–21); George Rose (2017–20); Djuro Sen (2017–19); Tanisha Stanton (2017–19)
- Starring: Jodan Perry, Dean Widders
- Country of origin: Australia
- Original language: English

Production
- Production locations: SBS (Artarmon, NSW)
- Running time: 60 minutes approx. (inc. adverts)

Original release
- Network: NITV
- Release: 12 April 2017

Related
- Yokayi Footy; Barefoot Sports

Over The Black Dot is an Indigenous-oriented rugby league program that airs on NITV. The show primarily features discussion and highlights of National Rugby League matches, with a particular focus on Indigenous players and their stories and performances. Hosted by Jodan Perry and featuring analysis from former NRL star Dean Widders and touch football world champion Bo De La Cruz, the program airs at 9:30pm every Tuesday.

== Format ==
The format of Over The Black Dot features highlights and discussion of the previous week's NRL matches, followed by interviews with players and then a preview of the following week's games. The show runs for 30 minutes including advertisements.
