= Tony Trudgett =

Australian rugby league footballer

Personal information
- Full name: Tony Keith Trudgett
- Born: 29 March 1955 (age 69); St Marys, New South Wales, Australia

Playing information
- Position: Five-eighth
Club
Years	Team	Pld	T	G	FG	P
1978–83	St George Dragons	135	26	0	0	80
1985	Penrith Panthers	16	5	0	0	20
	Total	151	31	0	0	100
Representative
Years	Team	Pld	T	G	FG	P
1979–80	New South Wales	2	0	0	0	0
1984	NSW Country	1	1	0	0	4

Tony Trudgett (born 29 March 1955) is an Australian former rugby league footballer who played in the 1970s and 1980s. He was a one time premiership winning player with St. George Dragons.

== Playing career ==
Trudgett played for Oberon during his early career. He was signed by English club Workington Town for the 1974–75 season on the recommendation of Tony Paskins, who had played for Workington himself in the 1950s.

He represented Illawarra and Country Seconds between 1976 and 1977, Sydney Seconds in 1979, and New South Wales against Great Britain in 1979.

He transferred to St. George from Dapto in 1978 and played six seasons with the club between 1978 and 1983. Trudgett won a premiership with St. George in 1979. He had one last season at Penrith in 1985 where he made 21 appearances as the club made the finals for the first time in their history. Trudgett played in the clubs inaugural match in the finals against Parramatta where they lost 38-6. Trudgett then moved to Nambucca Heads, New South Wales in 1986 as a player.
