= Josefa Lasagavibau =

Fiji international rugby league footballer

Personal information
- Born: Fiji

Playing information
- Position: Halfback
Representative
Years	Team	Pld	T	G	FG	P
2000	Fiji	2	0	0	0	0

Josefa Lasagavibau is a Fijian rugby league footballer who represented Fiji in the 2000 World Cup.

== Playing career ==
While playing for the Nadera club in the Fiji National Rugby League Competition, Lasagavibau was selected in the Fijian squad for the 2000 World Cup and played in two matches from the bench, against Russia and England.

In 2010 he joined the Orange Hawks in Australia's Group 10 Rugby League competition. In 2012 he joined the Windsor Wolves in the Bundaberg Red Cup.
