= Woodbridge Cup =

Rugby league competition in New South Wales, Australia

- Sport: Rugby league
- Instituted: 1961 (as Group 9 Second Division)
- Inaugural season: 1990 (as Woodbridge Cup)
- Number of teams: 12
- Country: Australia
- Premiers: Oberon Tigers (2026)
- Most titles: Cargo Blue Heelers (8 titles)
- Website: Official Site

The Woodbridge Cup is a rugby league competition run by the New South Wales Country Rugby League. It encompasses smaller senior clubs in the Mid-West and Central West of the state. The neighbouring Mid-West Cup competition's remaining clubs merged into the league in 2022 when that league initially folded (it has since re-formed without the teams that joined the Woodbridge Cup). For all intents and purposes, it is a second division competition in the Group 11 and from 2022, Group 10 areas.

== History ==
=== Group 9 Second Division ===
The competition began as the Group 9 Second Division in the 1940s, with clubs from towns such as Binalong, Stockinbingal and Boorowa among others. The competition has slowly moved north however, and effectively operates as the Group 11 Rugby League second division, with only Grenfell remaining from the Group 9 days, something that was reflected in the name change to the Woodbridge Cup in 1990.

=== Woodbridge Cup ===
In 2022, the Mid West Cup (Group 10 Rugby League Second Division) merged into the competition, taking the competition from a total of 9 to 12 teams. Although that competition has re-formed, the teams that joined the Woodbridge Cup will not return to the competition.

== Current clubs ==
There will be 12 clubs competing in the Woodbridge Cup in 2026.

Club	Nickname	Home Ground	No. of Premierships	Premiership Years
Canowindra	Tigers	Tom Clyburn Oval	1	1995
Cargo	Blue Heelers	Cargo Oval	8	2000, 2002, 2006, 2008, 2009, 2011, 2013, 2014
Cowra	Magpies	Sid Kallas Oval	0	None
Blayney	Bears	King George Oval	0	None
Eugowra	Golden Eagles	Eugowra Sports Ground	3	2001, 2005, 2012
Grenfell	Goannas	Henry Lawson Park	4	1990, 1994, 1998, 2010
Manildra	Rhinos	Jack Huxley Oval	3	2022, 2023, 2024
Molong	Bulls	Molong Recreation Ground	1	1999
Oberon	Tigers	Oberon Sports Ground	2	2025, 2026
Orange United	Warriors	Wade Park	0	None
Peak Hill	Roosters	Lindner Oval	0	None
Trundle	Boomers	Berryman Park	3	2017, 2018, 2019

=== Former Clubs (Woodbridge Cup era) ===
- Binalong Brahmans (moved to George Tooke Shield)
- Boorowa Rovers (moved to George Tooke Shield)
- Burrangong Bears (moved to George Tooke Shield)
- CSU Mungoes (in recess)
- Condobolin Rams (in recess)
- Gooloogong Cowboys (folded)
- Koorawatha Jets (folded)
- Monteagle Magpies (folded)
- Quandialla (folded)

=== Former Clubs (Group 9 Second Division era) ===
- Barmedman
- Bendick Murrell
- Bimbi
- Brunda
- Caragabal
- Galong
- Greenethorpe
- Pinnacle
- Stockinbingal
- Wallendbeen

== Premierships ==
Season	Premiers	Score	Runners-up	Grand final host (attendance)	Minor premiers	Teams
Koorawatha Cup realigned as Group 9 Second Division.
1961						
1962						
1963						
1964	Boorowa					
1965	Wyangala Dam		Boorowa			
1966	Galong		Boorowa			
1967	Boorowa					
1968	Stockinbingal	29–10	Binalong			
1969	Stockinbingal	27–9	Binalong			
1970	Stockinbingal	14–5	Binalong			
1971	Binalong	20–11	Bendick Murrell			
1972	Bendick Murrell		Burrangong	Young		
1973	Bendick Murrell		Stockinbingal	Young		
1974	Barmedman	22–11	Burrangong			
1975	Grenfell	13–5	Barmedman			
1976	Quandialla		Burrangong			
1977	Burrangong	16–15	Boorowa		Burrangong	
1978	Boorowa	30–12	Grenfell		Boorowa	
1979	Quandialla	11–6	Bendick Murrell		Bendick Murrell	
1980	Boorowa	10–8 (replay)	Quandialla		Stockinbingal	
1981	Burrangong	38–18	Boorowa		Burrangong	
1982	Boorowa	31–8	Grenfell		Boorowa	
1983	Boorowa	30–22	Woodstock		Grenfell	
1984	Bendick Murrell		Boorowa			
1985	Grenfell	26–10	Woodstock		Grenfell	
1986	Grenfell	20–6	Burrangong		Grenfell	
1987	Monteagle	17–12	Barmedman		Monteagle	
1988	Grenfell	16–4	Barmedman		Burrangong	
1989	Koorawatha	30–17	Grenfell			
Group 9 Second Division renamed Woodbridge Cup, after admittance of Group 9 clubs.
1990	Grenfell	22–18	Quandialla			
1991	Binalong	22–10	Burrangong		Burrangong	
1992	Burrangong	38–20	Koorawatha		Burrangong	
1993	Monteagle	24–22 (A.E.T.)	Burrangong	Young		
1994	Grenfell	34–14	Canowindra		Grenfell	
1995	Canowindra	30–24	Grenfell		Canowindra	
1996	Koorawatha	32–22	Canowindra		Koorawatha	
1997	Burrangong	29–18	Grenfell		Burrangong	
1998	Grenfell	32–22	Boorowa			
1999	Molong	26–24	Boorowa		Boorowa	
2000	Cargo	30–18	Koorawatha		Cargo	
2001	Eugowra	29–28	Koorawatha		Cargo	
2002	Cargo	24–12	Canowindra		Cargo	
2003	Koorawatha	44–22	Cargo		Burrangong	
2004	Burrangong	34–22 (A.E.T.)	Koorawatha		Burrangong	
2005	Eugowra	28–12	Cargo	Cowra	Eugowra	
2006	Cargo	26–12	Grenfell		Cargo	
2007	Koorawatha	50–32	Condobolin	Cowra	Condobolin	8
2008	Cargo	30–18	Manildra	Cowra	Cargo	11
2009	Cargo	26–14	Eugowra		Manildra	8
2010	Grenfell	26–22	Eugowra	Cowra	Grenfell	10
2011	Cargo	37–24	Canowindra	Cargo (2,112)	Peak Hill	8
2012	Eugowra	32–22	Peak Hill	Canowindra	Eugowra	9
2013	Cargo	22–12	Eugowra	Eugowra	Eugowra	8
2014	Cargo	24–14	Eugowra	Grenfell	Eugowra	9
2015	Binalong	30–28	Trundle	Young	Binalong	9
2016	Condobolin	18–16	Trundle	Canowindra	Trundle	9
2017	Trundle	36–12	Cargo	Condobolin	Trundle	9
2018	Trundle	26–22	Manildra	Manildra (1,800)	Trundle	10
2019	Trundle	56–0	Manildra	Trundle	Trundle	9
2020 and 2021 Seasons cancelled due to COVID-19
2022	Manildra	34–16	Oberon	Grenfell	Manildra	12
2023	Manildra	18–16	Trundle	Manildra (2,341)	Manildra	12
2024	Manildra	20–4	Canowindra	Peak Hill	Cowra	13
2025	Oberon	32–8	Manildra	Canowindra (2,300)	Oberon	12 (Note: Does not include Blayney, who withdrew after five rounds.)
2026	Oberon	24–14	Blayney	Cowra	Oberon	12

== Lower grades ==
=== Youth League ===
Season	Premiers	Score	Runner-up
2010	Peak Hill		Canowindra
2011	Peak Hill	30–22	Canowindra
2012	Canowindra	60–12	Eugowra
2013	Peak Hill	36–12	Canowindra
2014	Peak Hill	17–10	Grenfell
2015	Peak Hill	28–10	Eugowra
2016	Manildra		Binalong
2017	Manildra	26–8	Trundle
2018	Manildra	18–14	Canowindra
2019	Manildra	19–4	Trundle
2022	Molong	30–24	Grenfell
2023	Molong	13–6	Canowindra
2024	Molong	28–16	Orange United
2025	Orange United	16–12	Blayney
2026	Cowra	42–8	Oberon

=== Women's League Tag ===
Season	Premiers	Score	Runner-up
2010	Grenfell
2011	Canowindra	4–2	Eugowra
2012	Canowindra	22–8	Condobolin
2013	Condobolin
2014	Condobolin	16–12	Eugowra
2015	Eugowra	14–6	Binalong
2016	Grenfell		Condobolin
2017	Eugowra
2018	Cargo	20–18	Eugowra
2019	Cargo	32–16	Grenfell
2022	Grenfell	18–14	Manildra
2023	Manildra	10–6	Cargo
2024	Manildra	10–6	Canowindra
2025	Cargo	12–6	Manildra
2026	Cargo	14–12	Manildra

== See also ==
- Rugby League Competitions in Australia
