= Oberon Tigers =

Australian rugby league club, based in Oberon NSW

Club information
- Full name: Oberon Tigers Rugby League Football Club
- Nickname(s): Tigers
- Short name: Oberon Tigers
- Colours: Primary: Black; Gold

Current details
- Ground(s): Oberon Sports Ground
- Competition: Woodbridge Cup

Uniforms
Home colours

Records
- Premierships: 11 (1961, 1962, 1963, 1964, 1965, 1966, 1967, 1969, 1970, 1971, 1975)

Oberon Tigers is an Australian rugby league football team based in the Central West town of Oberon. The Tigers first played in the Country Rugby League-controlled Group 10 Rugby League in the competition's inaugural season in 1947, before dropping out at the end of the 1951 season. The Tigers returned in 1954 and competed in Group 10 until the end of the 1996 season. It also had another two spells in the competition from 2005-2008 and 2011-2019. They now play in the Woodbridge Cup.

The club is one of the most successful teams in Group 10 history, having won 11 top grade titles, including a Group-record seven consecutive premierships from 1961 to 1967 and playing in a record 12 consecutive grand finals from 1960 to 1971. However, the club has not won a Premier League title since 1975 and the Tigers' last grade success was when its Under 18s side won the 1989 grand final.

Oberon was captain-coached by former NRL forward Josh Starling for 2019, who previously played for South Sydney, Manly and Newcastle. Starling left the club at the end of 2019 due to family reasons. The team withdrew from Group 10 at the end of 2019 season and competed in the Mid West Cup from 2020-2021.

== History ==
Oberon Tigers were one of inaugural sides of Group 10 Rugby League in 1947. Throughout the 1960s and 1970s, the Tigers asserted itself as one of the best teams in Country Rugby League, let alone Group 10. From 1958 to 1971, Oberon featured in all but one grand final, missing out in the 1959 decider. The club would achieve a Group 10 record seven consecutive premierships from 1961 and 1967 and featured in 12 consecutive grand finals from 1960 to 1971. The Tigers would also win the prestigious Clayton Cup in 1964, a trophy awarded by Country Rugby League to the NSW country rugby league team with the best overall record.

The club would begin its incredible run in 1961, claiming a 22−7 win over Lithgow Workmen's Club in Bathurst, with star of the match being captain-coach Tony Paskins. The Tigers would enjoy further success Workmen's, defeating the Lithgow-based side in the 1962 decider 14−7 at Wade Park in Orange, the 1963 decider 23−2 in Bathurst, the 1964 decider 30−2, and the 1965 decider 29−5.

Oberon would face a different opponent in 1965, this time taking on Bathurst Charlestons at the Bathurst Sportsground, where Oberon prevailed 23−10.

The Bathurst Sportsground hosted more than 4,000 for the 1967 decider to see Oberon completely outclass Charlestons 23−2. However, Oberon's record run on seven consecutive Group 10 premierships would come to an end, as Bathurst St Patrick's managed a narrow 9−8 win in the 1968 decider. While the Tigers outscored St Patrick's with two tries to one, the goal-kicking from the Bathurst team proved the difference.

Oberon would win three more titles in the 1970s, a 7−6 win over Cowra in 1970, a 12−5 win over Cowra in 1971 and a 17−4 win over Ex-Service's. The 1975 premiership would remains the Tigers last premiership as of the 2018 season.

The club would then go on to struggle for many years and left Group 10 Rugby League in the early 2000s, joining the second-tier Mid West Cup for several seasons, before returning to the top-flight in 2012.

In earlier 2016, Oberon, who were considered the competition's cellar-dwellers, pulled off the signing of the season when it recruit former Manly, Melbourne and St George Illawarra forward George Rose. Rose joined his brothers Matt and Trent for the 2016 season, however, he would leave the club at the end of the season.

Oberon would pull-off another signing coupe when it recruited former NRL playmaker Luke Branighan to the club for the 2017. Branighan had spent the past four years as the coach of Group 9 Rugby League club Young Cherrypickers. Branighan would lead Oberon to the 2017 premiership decider against Orange CYMS, the club's first grand final since 1975, however, the Tigers would surrender a 22−8 lead with 20 minutes remaining to lose 23−22 by a last-gasp field goal from CYMS' captain Mick Sullivan.

The Tigers string of top signings continued in 2018, with Josh Starling recruited to the club. However, the Tigers was unable to match its 2017 run and were knocked out of the finals in the opening week by eventual premiers Bathurst Panthers. Branighan would depart the club at the end of the season, after signing on to coach Bathurst St Patrick's for the 2019 season, meaning Starling was promoted to the captain-coach role for 2019.

== Team of the century ==
Oberon Tigers' Team of the Century was announced in August 2008, in conjunction with the Australian Rugby League's celebration of 100 years of rugby league in Australia.

No.

Position
Player

1 Bill Fawcett – FB 2 Brian Harvey – WG 3 Ken Nicholl – CE 4 Trevor Grady – CE 5 Gordon Rawlings – WG 6 Jock Schrader – FE 7 Norm Brown – HB 8 Don Elwin – PR 9 Col Ewin – HK

No.

Position
Player

10 John Rush – PR 11 Laurie Evans – SR 12 John Harvey – SR 13 Garry Fisher – LK 14 Garry Harvey – positions 15 Chris Ryan – positions 16 Neville Kelly – positions 17 Bruce Gibbs – positions 18 Tony Trudgett – positions

== Team records ==
Premier League: (11) 1961, 1962, 1963, 1964, 1965, 1966, 1967, 1969, 1970, 1971, 1975

Runners-up: (4) 1958, 1960, 1968, 2017

Minor premiers: (8) 1959, 1962, 1963, 1964, 1966, 1967, 1975, 1976

Clayton Cup: (1) 1964

Mid West Cup: (2) 2003, 2020

First Division: (4) 1962, 1966, 1975, 1976

Under 18s: (2) 1972, 1989

== See also ==
- Rugby League Competitions in Australia
