= George Rose (rugby league) =

Indigenous Australian rugby league footballer

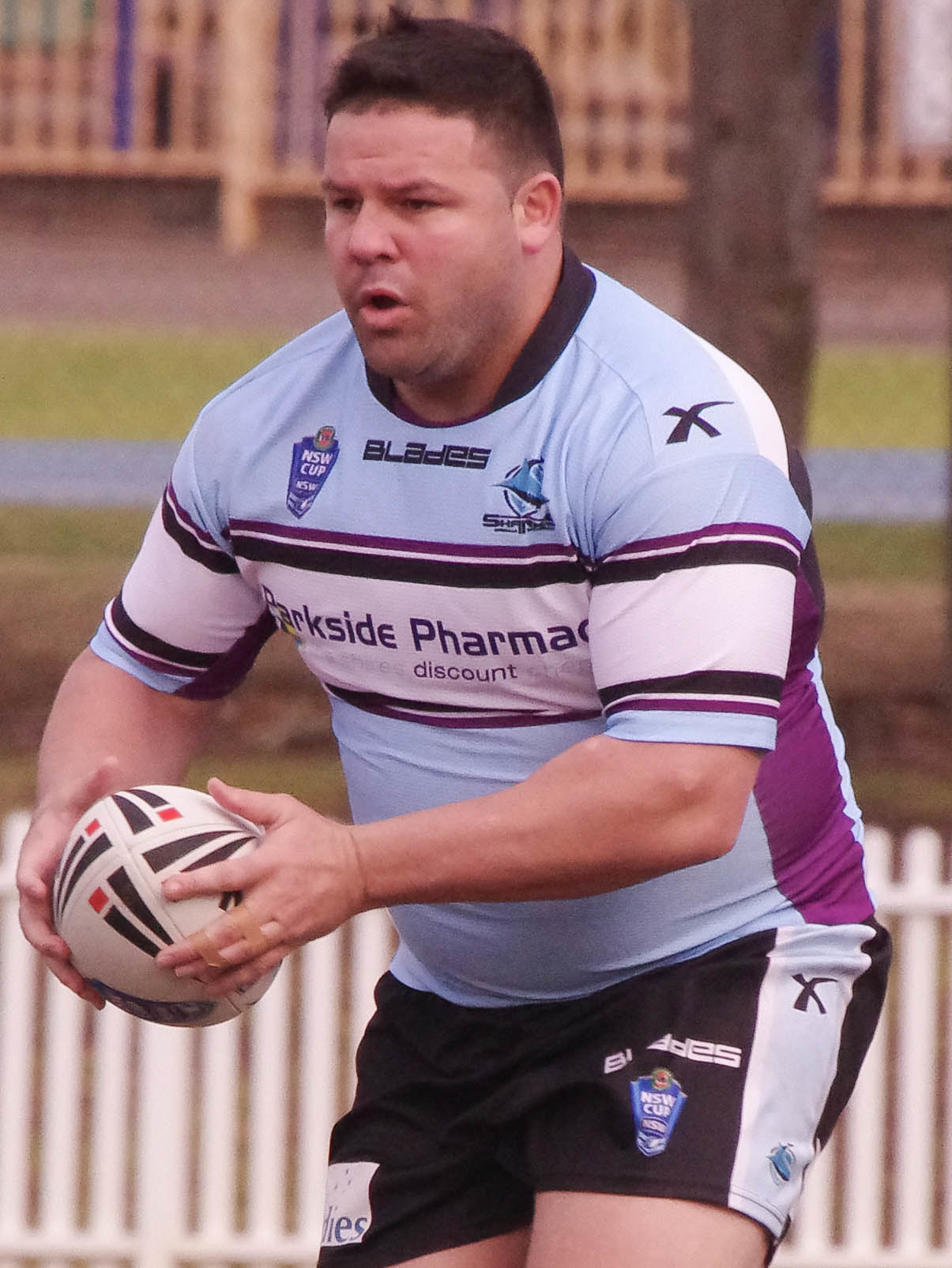

Personal information
- Born: 13 March 1983 (age 43) Bathurst, New South Wales, Australia

Playing information
- Height: 188 cm (6 ft 2 in)
- Weight: 128 kg (20 st 2 lb)
- Position: Prop
Club
Years	Team	Pld	T	G	FG	P
2004–05	Sydney Roosters	6	0	0	0	0
2006–13	Manly Sea Eagles	129	10	0	0	40
2014	Melbourne Storm	9	0	0	0	0
2015	St. George Illawarra	10	0	0	0	0
	Total	154	10	0	0	40
Representative
Years	Team	Pld	T	G	FG	P
2009–15	Prime Minister's XIII	1	1	0	0	4
2010–15	Indigenous All Stars	6	0	0	0	0

George Rose (born 13 March 1983) is an Indigenous Australian Boxing promoter and former professional rugby league footballer. He played for the Melbourne Storm, Manly-Warringah Sea Eagles, Sydney Roosters and the St. George Illawarra Dragons in the NRL.

== Early life ==
Rose was born in Bathurst, New South Wales and was educated at Kelso High School.

George played his junior rugby league for the Bathurst Penguins.

== Playing career ==
An indigenous representative prop forward, he previously played for Sydney NRL clubs the Manly-Warringah Sea Eagles (with whom he won the 2011 NRL Premiership) Melbourne Storm and Sydney Roosters.

During the round 11, 2007, match against the Melbourne Storm, Rose badly broke his leg in a tackle midway through the second half. He missed the rest of the 2007 season, including Manly's grand final appearance, and returned to play for Manly at New South Wales Cup level in 2008.

In 2008, he featured for the Indigenous Dreamtime team against the New Zealand Māori in a curtain-raiser to the opening game of the World Cup. He also featured for the Indigenous All Stars in their match against the NRL All Stars to kick off the 2010 NRL season.

Rose broke back into Manly's top side in 2009, after playing off the bench in Manly's win over Leeds in the 2009 World Club Challenge. Following a breakout year, Rose was named as the Sea Eagles Player of the Year for the 2009 season.

On 2 October 2011 Rose played from the bench in Manly's 2011 NRL Grand Final win over the New Zealand Warriors 24–10 in front of 81,988 fans at the ANZ Stadium in Sydney. Rose was placed on report for an elbow to Warriors hooker Aaron Heremaia in the 29th minute of the game and received a one match ban as a result.

In round 1 of the 2014 NRL season, Rose made his Melbourne Storm debut against his former club Manly-Warringah.

On 28 October 2014, Rose signed a one-year deal with the St George Illawarra Dragons for the 2015 season.

Rose was Awarded the Preston Campbell Medal for Man of the Match performance in the All Stars Game 2015, played at Cbus Super Stadium on the Gold Coast, 13 February 2015.

In 2017, it was revealed that Rose was playing for the Moore Park Broncos in the local Sydney Combined Competition.

== Post playing- Boxing promoter ==
After retiring from the NRL in 2015 Rose Is currently a promoter and CEO of No Limit Boxing as Australian top boxing promotion with fighters like Tszyu Brothers (Tim Tszyu and Nikita Tszyu), Paul Gallen, Sam Goodman, Liam Wilson and top Australian Boxing prospects like Olympians Harry Garside and Paulo Aokuso.

== Personal life ==
Rose studied commerce at the University of Sydney. He currently works in media with National Indigenous Television and hosts the rugby league show "Over the Black Dot".

Rose drew comparisons during his playing career to the immortal Arthur Beetson. Both mentioned in the context of Aboriginal rights and rugby league, particularly in relation to Indigenous round events and the importance of representation.

Rose said on meeting Beetson, "The first time I met Artie, he knew my name and I was in shock. He took me car shopping one day and while I looked at cars he ate pies in the cafe at 8am. What a great bloke."
