= Michael Sullivan (rugby league) =

Australian rugby league footballer

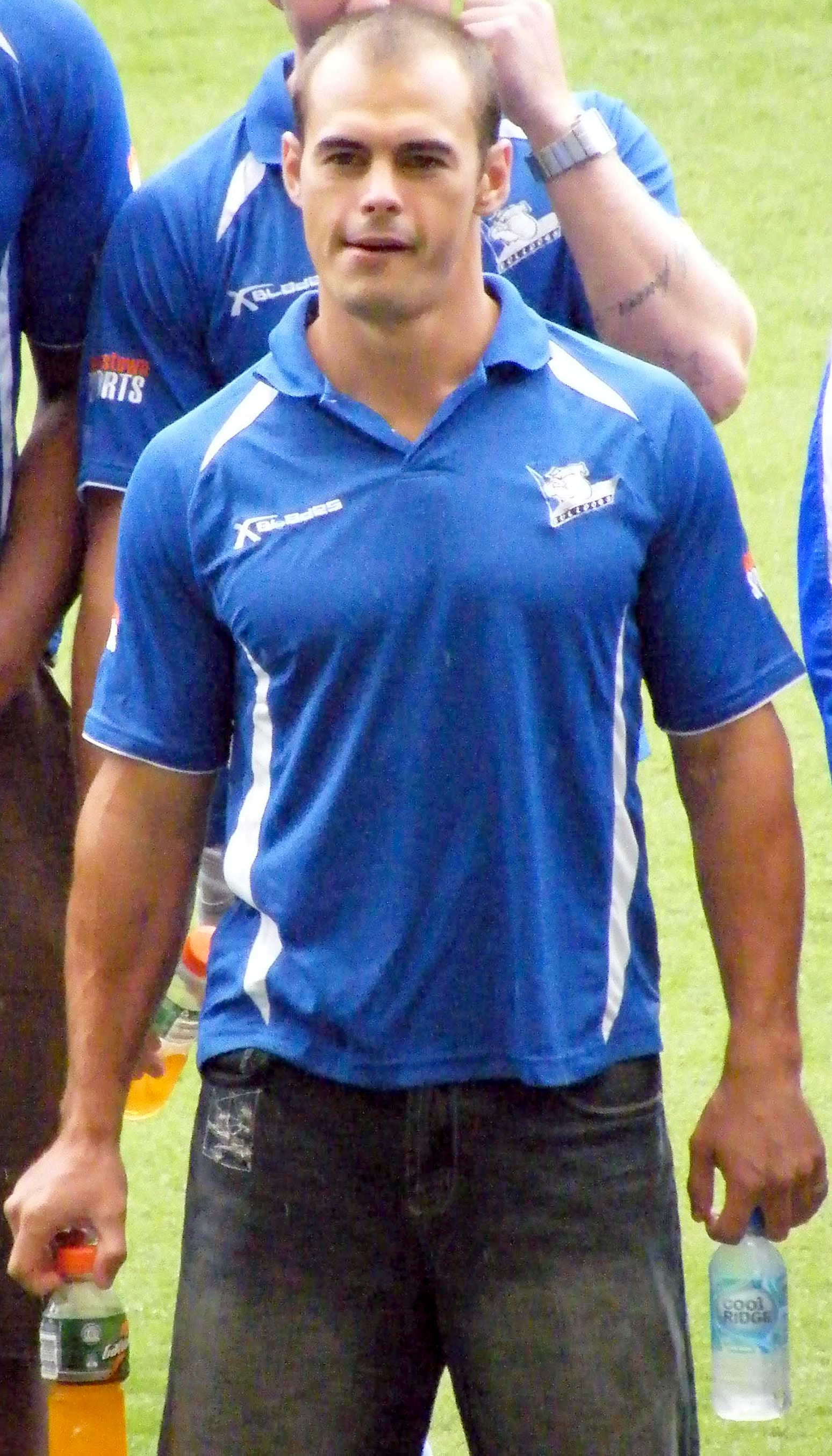

Personal information
- Full name: Michael Sullivan
- Born: 18 June 1980 (age 45); Taree, New South Wales, Australia

Playing information
- Height: 172 cm (5 ft 8 in)
- Weight: 84 kg (13 st 3 lb)
- Position: Hooker
Club
Years	Team	Pld	T	G	FG	P
2000	Northern Eagles	1	0	0	0	0
2003–05	Cronulla-Sutherland	61	13	0	1	53
2006–07	Warrington	42	10	1	0	42
2008–09	Canterbury-Bankstown	12	1	0	0	4
	Total	116	24	1	1	99

Michael Sullivan (born 18 June 1980) is an Australian former professional rugby league footballer who played in the 2000s. He played in the NRL for the Northern Eagles, Cronulla-Sutherland Sharks and Canterbury-Bankstown, as well as in the Super League for the Warrington Wolves, usually as a hooker.

== Background ==
Sullivan was born in Taree, New South Wales, Australia. Michael his junior rugby league for Wingham Tigers & Taree City Bulls.

== Career ==
Sullivan made his first grade debut for the now defunct Northern Eagles in Round 26 2000 against Auckland.

In 2003, Sullivan joined Cronulla-Sutherland and was a consistent member of the first grade side over the next 3 seasons. In 2006, Sullivan joined English side Warrington.

Sullivan returned to the NRL in 2008 to play with Canterbury on a two-year contract.

After finishing his contract with Canterbury, Sullivan signed as Captain/Coach for the Orange CYMS in Group 10 Rugby League.

In Sullivan's nine-year tenure at CYMS, he has got the Club into 7 Grand Finals and won 5. The Grand Final wins were in 2010, 2011, 2013, 2015 & 2017. Sullivan is the most successful coach in CYMS 73-year history. In April 2018, Sullivan announced he would leave Orange CYMS to join his junior club, the Wingham Tigers. In 2022, Sullivan was announced as the head coach for the Berkeley Vale Panthers first grade team for the 2023 season and beyond.

== Off the field ==
One of rugby league's pin-up players, Sullivan was selected as one of Cleo magazine's 50 Most Eligible Bachelors for 2001, and was a finalist in the Sexiest Man in Rugby League competition in 2001 and 2005.

Sullivan posed with former Canterbury teammates Nick Youngquest and Daniel Holdsworth for the Gods of Football charity calendar.

In 2005 Sullivan revealed he had a gambling addiction and had lost over $500,000.

=== Career highlights ===
- Junior Club: Wingham Tigers, North Sydney Bears
- First Grade Debut: Round 26, Northern Eagles v Warriors at Ericsson Stadium, 30 July,
