= Bathurst St Patrick's =

Australian rugby league club, based in Bathurst, NSW

Club information
- Full name: Bathurst St Patrick's Rugby League Football Club
- Nickname(s): St Pat's, Saints
- Short name: Bathurst St Patrick's
- Colours: Primary: Blue; White
- Founded: 1943; 83 years ago (as Bathurst CYMS)

Current details
- Ground: Jack Arrow Sporting Complex
- Coach: Chris Osborne
- Competition: Western Premiership
- 2025 Western Premiership season: 7th

Uniforms
Home colours

Records
- Premierships: 6 (1968, 1973, 1989, 2001, 2008, 2014)
- Runners-up: 2 (1953, 1982)

Bathurst St Patrick's, more commonly referred to as St Pat's, are an Australian rugby league football team based in the Central West city of Bathurst. St Pat's played in the Country Rugby League-controlled Group 10 Rugby League from 1948 to 2022, when they joined the new Western Premiership, an amalgamation of Group 10 and Group 11. The Saints have won six premierships, the most recent a 34–12 win over Cowra Magpies in 2014.

== History ==
Bathurst St Patrick's were established in 1943, originally called Bathurst CYMS, and donned a strip of royal blue and white. The original squad featured Brother Anson, Bill Bell, Keith Bell, Buddy Burke, Dick Burke, Digger Delhunty, Ford Eviston, Kevin Fitzgerald, Tom Hayes, Brother Kevin, Peter Lew, Horace Lloyd, Brother McCormack, Ron McGill, Bill Muldoon, Jack Muldoon and Father Shannon.

St Pat's qualified for its first Group 10 Rugby League grand final in 1953, meeting Orange CYMS at the Bathurst Sports Ground. In front of almost 7,000, CYMS won a close match, prevailing 9–8.

St Pat's would have to wait another 15 years before it made another grand final, this time coming up against an Oberon Tigers side in 1968 that had won the past seven grand finals. Played at the Bathurst Sports Ground, St Pat's were captained by club legend Jack Arrow, with Bill Horder pulling the strings as coach. The Bathurst club lead 4–2 at half-time and pulled out to a 9–8 lead in the second-half, which was enough to secure the club's first premiership.

Five years later, St Pat's would qualify for another grand final as this time the 1973 minor premiers played Orange Ex-Service's in the decider. The side in navy blue and white raced to an early 5–0 lead before hooker Wayne "Jock" Colley was carried from the field with a serious leg injury. It was Graham Toohey who came on to replace Colley, helping his side to a 7–5 lead at half-time against its Orange rivals. A strong second half from St Pat's proved the difference as the hosts won 20–14. Ian Toohey, Roger Toohey and Peter Sikora all scored tries for St Pat's, while Keither Waters was the lone try scorer for Ex-Service's.

St Pat's faced the Lithgow Shamrocks in the 1982 side, with the latter looking for its maiden premiership. The grand final finished in heart-breaking fashion for St Pat's, with Shamrocks five-eighth Glen Holton kicking a field goal minutes from time to seal Shamrocks' first premiership with a 16–15 win.

The club would have to wait another seven years before another grand final, with St Pat's securing a 31–14 win over Cowra Magpies at home. Captain-coach Mick Siejka was chaired off the field by teammates following the match, with a crowd of 2,800 on hand to watch the match at Jack Arrow Oval.

St Pat's would win two grand finals in the first decade of the 21st century, in 2001 and 2008. The 2008 premiership win over the Mudgee Dragons was a special one for St Pat's, after the club had lost club legend Dave Scott to a heart attack in December 2007.

The club would be plagued by financial problems in 2011 after members of the St Pat's Sporting Club decided to place it into liquidation. The sporting club would later be sold and turned into a pub. St Pat's were then forced to find a new home ground and would call the Bathurst Sports Ground home until the end of the 2017 season.

St Pat's most recent premiership came in 2014, after a 34–12 win away to the Cowra Magpies. St Pat's hooker Benji John put in a man of the match performance, scoring three tries, while Garry Reilly, Derryn Clayton and Luke Single all scored a try each for the premiers.

In 2018, St Pat's would play its first game at the newly constructed Jack Arrow Sporting Complex, after a seven-year wait for a new home ground. The Saints would prevail against the Oberon Tigers 16–10.

== Team records ==
Premier League: (6) 1968, 1973, 1989, 2001, 2008, 2014

Runners-up: (2) 1953, 1982

First Division: (6) 1988, 1989, 2001, 2004, 2005, 2018

Under 18s: (7) 1961, 1965, 1969, 1977, 2009, 2012, 2019

Women's League Tag: (5) 2012, 2015, 2017, 2018, 2019

== Notable Juniors ==
- William Kennedy (2019– Cronulla Sharks)

== See also ==
- Rugby League Competitions in Australia
