= Josh Starling =

Australian rugby league footballer

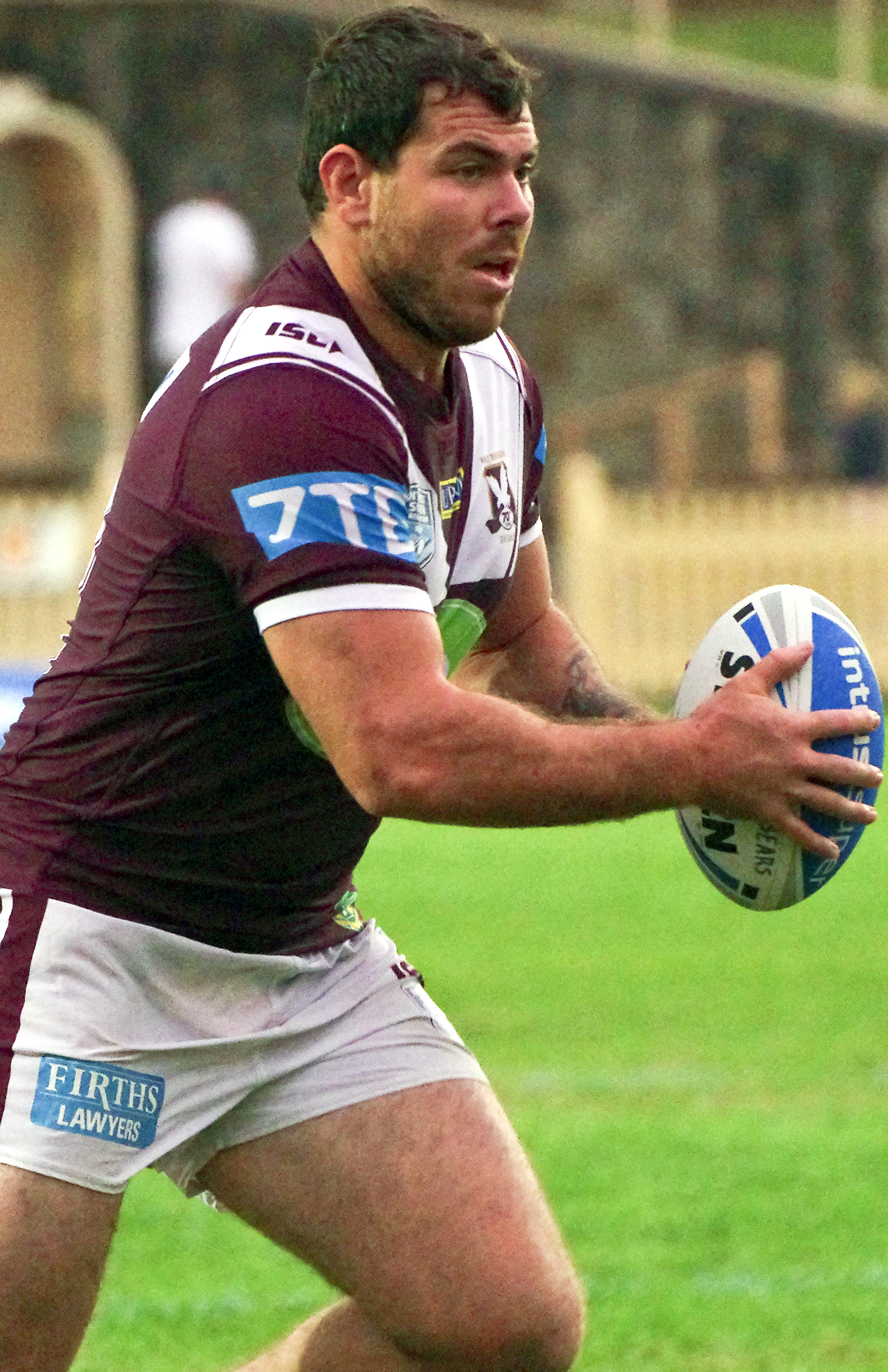

Personal information
- Born: 18 May 1990 (age 36) Woonona, New South Wales, Australia

Playing information
- Height: 186 cm (6 ft 1 in)
- Weight: 115 kg (18 st 2 lb)
- Position: Prop
Club
Years	Team	Pld	T	G	FG	P
2012–13	South Sydney	7	0	0	0	0
2014–16	Manly Sea Eagles	60	2	0	0	8
2017	Newcastle Knights	13	0	0	0	0
	Total	80	2	0	0	8

Josh Starling (born 18 May 1990) is an Australian former professional rugby league footballer. He played for the South Sydney Rabbitohs, Manly Warringah Sea Eagles and Newcastle Knights in the National Rugby League and his position was prop.

== Background ==
Born in Woonona, New South Wales, Starling played his junior rugby league for the Helensburgh Tigers, before being signed by the South Sydney Rabbitohs. In 2009 and 2010, Starling played for the South Sydney Rabbitohs' NYC team, before heading up north in 2011 to play for the Tweed Heads Seagulls in the Queensland Cup. During the 2011 season, he signed a contract with the Brisbane Broncos starting in 2012, but later chose to return to the Rabbitohs instead.

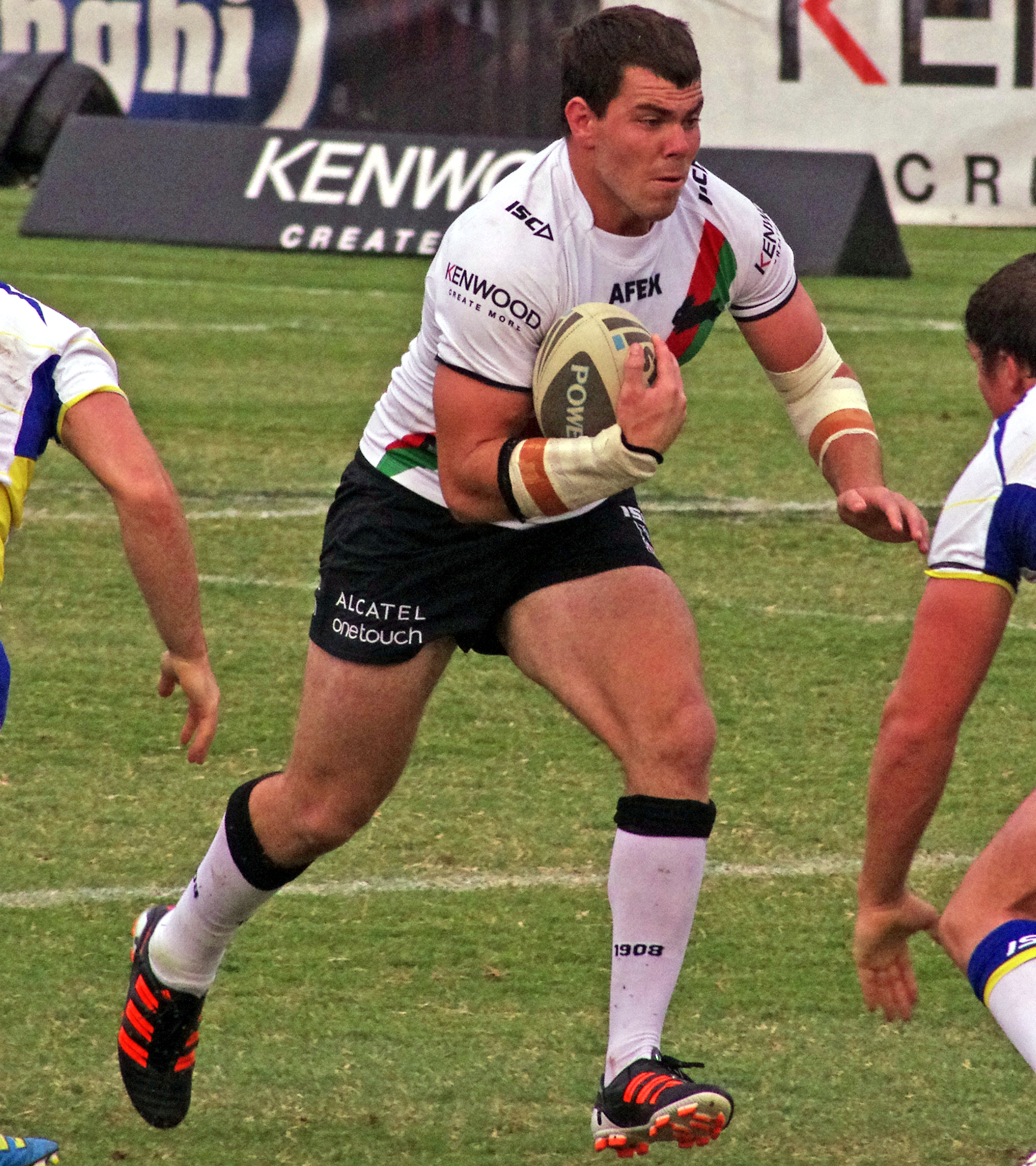
Starling playing for the Rabbitohs

== Playing career ==
=== 2012 ===
In round 8 of the 2012 NRL season, Starling made his NRL debut for South Sydney against the North Queensland Cowboys.

=== 2013 ===
On 7 July, Starling signed a three-year contract with the Manly-Warringah Sea Eagles starting in 2014. Later on that month, Starling, whilst playing for the North Sydney Bears in the second-tier New South Wales Cup competition, was selected in the annual New South Wales Residents clash against the Queensland Residents, playing in the curtain-raiser to the State of Origin decider. In September, he was named at prop in the 2013 New South Wales Cup Team of the Year. Finishing up with South Sydney at the end of 2013, he made a total of 40 appearances and scored 3 tries for their New South Wales Cup side North Sydney.

=== 2014 ===
Starling made his Manly-Warringah debut in round 1 of the 2014 season.

=== 2015 ===
Starling played for the Manly club in the 2015 NRL Auckland Nines.

=== 2016 ===
In November, after failing to gain a new contract from Manly-Warringah, Starling signed a one-year contract with the Newcastle Knights starting in 2017.

=== 2017 ===
Starling played 13 matches for the Knights in 2017, before a back injury ended his season. He left the club at the end of the season after not being offered a new contract beyond 2017, before announcing his retirement from the professional level of the game.

== Post playing ==
In 2019, Starling departed the Oberon Tigers at the end of the season. Starling played for the Bathurst Panthers team in the 2020 season. As of 2024, Starling has been a part of the Kiama Knights U16s coaching staff.

== Statistics ==
Year	Team	Games	Tries	Pts
2012	South Sydney Rabbitohs	3		
2013	South Sydney Rabbitohs	4		
2014	Manly Warringah Sea Eagles	26		
2015	Manly Warringah Sea Eagles	14		
2016	Manly Warringah Sea Eagles	20	2	8
2017	Newcastle Knights	13		
	Totals	80	2	8
