= Bathurst Panthers =

Australian rugby league football team

Club information
- Full name: Bathurst Panthers Rugby League Football Club
- Colours: Primary: Black; Red; Yellow; Green; White
- Founded: 2000

Current details
- Ground: Carrington Park Bathurst, New South Wales (13,000)
- Coach: Doug Hewitt
- Captain: Doug Hewitt
- Competition: Western Premiership
- 2025 season: 11th

Records
- Premierships: 4 (2006, 2007, 2018, 2019)
- Runners-up: 3 (2000, 2004, 2005)
- Minor premierships: 3 (2000, 2004, 2007)
- Wooden spoons: 2 (2010, 2012)

Bathurst Panthers is an Australian rugby league football team based in the Central West city of Bathurst. The Panthers have played Western Premiership since 2022, following the reorganization of Group 10 and Group 11 into one competition

The club has won three premierships during the 21st century under its current incarnation, defeating Lithgow Workmen's Club in both 2006 and 2007 by the scores of 10–4 (after extra-time) and 24–4 respectively, before winning another in 2018 against the Cowra Magpies. The club's most recent success premiership was a thrilling 12–10 win over the Cowra Magpies, with Panthers five-eight Willie Wright kicking a conversion from the sideline late in the second half. Panthers would back on their premiership with a 9–8 win over Mudgee Dragons in extra-time.

The club has a fierce rivalry with Bathurst St Patrick's.

== History ==
Bathurst Panthers Rugby League Football Club was founded in 2000 as a result of the amalgamation of the Bathurst Leagues Club and Penrith Panthers Leagues Club. While the club is only two decades old, Panthers can trace its origins to the 1920s with the establishment of the Charlestons Rugby League Football Club. Charlestons' only Premier League success was in 1979, an 11–9 victory over Cowra at the Bathurst Sports Ground.

In 1989, the Charlestons club amalgamated with the Bathurst Leagues Club to form the Bathurst Penguins Rugby League Football Club. Charlestons' Wayne Boyd and Graeme Bell were the core executive who negotiated the merger with the Bathurst Leagues Club's directors Dan Lavelle and Peter Tobin, as well as club secretary manager Rick Matthews. These three were the founding executives of the new Penguins club; Wayne Boyd as president, Peter Tobin as secretary, Graeme Bell as treasurer and Dan Lavelle as vice-president. The name 'Penguins' was selected as it was the official logo of the Bathurst Leagues Club, who had adopted the bird as its figurehead as the penguin is renowned as "never taking a backward step".

The Penguins enjoyed immediate success and played in the two lower grade grand finals in 1990, winning the First Division but being defeated by Orange CYMS in the Under 18s by a single point. Mal Fitzgerald was the inaugural Premier League coach but the club finished in the middle of the pack.

The first year efforts were subsequently built on under coaches Lindsay Johnson in 1991, beaten in a replay after the scores were lock in the 1992 grand final with Cowra. Penguins would finally break through for its maiden success in 1994 under coach Paul Upfield and in 1997 under coach Dave Scott.

Former NRL player for Parramatta, South Sydney and Sydney Roosters forward John Fearnley was appointed coach in 1998 and oversaw the club as it amalgamated with the Penrith Panthers Leagues Club, to form a new club the new Bathurst Panthers Rugby League Football Club.

Panthers would enjoy two consecutive grand final wins in Premier League against Lithgow Workmen's Club in 2006 and 2007, winning 10–4 after extra-time and 24–4 respectively. The club was coached by Dave Elvy.

In 2018, Panthers broke a 12-year Premier League premiership drought when captain-coach Doug Hewitt led the club to a famous 12–10 win over Cowra Magpies at Sid Kallas Oval, with five-eight Willie Wright kicking a conversion from the sideline with minutes remaining.

== Team of the Century ==
The Bathurst Panthers Team of the Century was announced in 2004, to mark a hundred years since rugby league was first played in Bathurst.

- Neville Smith
- Fred McGarry Sr
- Harold 'Dukey' Lewis
- Bill Bake
- Tom Marsh
- Brian 'Butch' Stevens
- Robbie Cashen
- Dave Nicholls
- Greg Hay
- Tony Burke

== Team records ==
Premier League: (4) 2006, 2007, 2018, 2019

Runners-Up: (3) 2000, 2004, 2005

Minor Premiership: (3) 2000, 2004, 2007

First Division: (8) 2000, 2002, 2003, 2008, 2009, 2011, 2013, 2016

Under 18s: (6) 2000, 2001, 2005, 2010, 2011, 2018

Women's League Tag: (2) 2013, 2014

== Notable Juniors ==
- George Rose (2004-15 (Sydney, Manly, St George Illawarra & Melbourne Storm)
- Harry Siejka (2011-15 Penrith Panthers, Wakefield & Bradford Bulls)

== See also ==
- Rugby League Competitions in Australia
