= Wade Park =

Sports ground in New South Wales, Australia

Coordinates: 33°17′21″S 149°6′5″E

- Interactive map of Wade Park
- Location: Orange, New South Wales
- Capacity: 8,000
- Surface: Grass

Tenant
- New South Wales Country Eagles (NRC) (2014-present)

Wade Park is a sports ground originally constructed for cricket located in the town of Orange, New South Wales, Australia.

== Cricket ==
The park has hosted Sheffield Shield matches, an International T20 match between Hong Kong and Sydney Thunder plus a number of competitive A-League matches featuring the Central Coast Mariners FC – in 2006's Pre-Season against Adelaide United (resulting in a 0–0 draw), and then again in 2007 when the Mariners and Queensland Roar played out a 1–1 draw. Crowds of approximately 3,000 made an appearance at these fixtures.

== Greyhound racing ==
From the 1930s until 2005 it hosted greyhound racing. The racing was under the control of the Orange Greyhound Racing Club when it ended.

== Rugby League ==
Wade Park hosted the 2009 City vs Country Origin NRL Game. The City vs Country Rugby League Game was a huge success. It more than doubled the A league games attendance with a crowd of over 8,000 people.

The ground is home to the Orange Hawks' Group 10 rugby league team. It is also one of the home grounds for the NSW Country Eagles team that plays in the National Rugby Championship.
