= Group 11 Rugby League =

Rugby league competition in Dubbo, New South Wales, Australia

- Sport: Rugby league
- Instituted: 1946
- Inaugural season: 1946
- Ceased: 2021
- Replaced by: Western Premiership
- Number of teams: 8
- Country: Australia
- Premiers: Wellington (2019)
- Most titles: Dubbo CYMS (15 titles)
- Website: Group 11 at SportsTG

Group 11 was a rugby league competition in the surrounding areas of Dubbo, New South Wales, Australia. The competition is played in four grades, these being First-Grade, Reserve-Grade, Under 19s and Ladies League Tag.

Ahead of the 2022 season, the Group 10 and Group 11 competitions merged to form the Western Premiership.

== Current clubs ==
All four grades of Group 11 Clubs play in the Peter McDonald Premiership alongside Group 10 clubs from the 2023 season. For the 2022 season, Group 11 only officially fielded reserve and women's league tag competitions, although a Group 11 Premier was still crowned in First Grade and Under 18s, with this being the best team in the Group 11 Pool of the Peter McDonald Premiership. This model will be used in all grades from 2023.

Town	Moniker	Home Ground	No. of Premierships	Premiership Years
Dubbo	CYMS	Apex Oval, Dubbo	16	1969, 1971, 1975, 1986, 2001, 2002, 2003, 2004, 2007, 2009, 2011, 2014, 2015, 2017, 2023, 2025
Dubbo Macquarie	Raiders	Apex Oval, Dubbo	7	1959, 1960, 1961, 1978, 1979, 1985, 2000, 2008, 2012
Forbes	Magpies	Spooner Oval, Forbes	9	1958, 1962, 1970, 1977, 1987, 2016, 2018, 2022, 2026
Nyngan	Tigers	Larkin Oval, Nyngan	0	None (2 in Group 15; 1979 & 1983)
Parkes	Spacemen	Pioneer Oval, Parkes	9	1954, 1972, 1973, 1983, 1984, 1988, 1996, 2010, 2013
Wellington	Cowboys	Kennard Park, Wellington	7	1946, 1948, 1990, 1991, 1992, 1994, 2019

* Indicates where a club won the Group Premiership in a Year that another team won the overall Peter McDonald Premiership.

== Previous clubs ==
Club	Nickname	No. of Premierships	Premiership Years	Moved to
Canowindra	Tigers	1	1947	Woodbridge Cup
Cobar	Roosters	4	1993, 1997, 1998, 2006	Group 14 Rugby League
Condobolin	Rams	2	1950, 1957	Woodbridge Cup
Cumnock	Cumnock	0	None	Folded
Dubbo	Dubbo	1	1949	Split: Macquarie and CYMS
Dubbo Westside	Rabbitohs	2	1981, 1982	Folded 2020
Eugowra	Golden Eagles	5	1963, 1964, 1965, 1966, 1967	Woodbridge Cup
Gilgandra	Panthers	1	1989	Group 14 Rugby League
Manildra	Rhinos	1	1999	Woodbridge Cup
Narromine	Jets	11	1952, 1953, 1955, 1956, 1968, 1974, 1976, 1980, 1995, 2000, 2005	Group 14 Rugby League
Peak Hill	Roosters	1	1951	Woodbridge Cup

=== Return of Westside ===
At a Group 11 AGM on Sunday 17 November 2013 the Group approved an application by the Dubbo Westside RLFC to be re-admitted to the competition as a result of a ballot undertaken by stakeholders that returned a resounding 25–11 vote in favour of Westside thus returning the club to the competition after the club folded in 1999. The Rabbitohs won the Group 11 Premiership twice with back to back title wins in 1981 and 1982 and It is expected the Rabbitohs will play their home games at No.1 Oval after the ground's previous rugby league tenants Dubbo CYMS elected to make the move to Apex Oval. The club folded as of 2020.

== Group 11 Premiers ==
=== Group 11 Premiers By Grade 1946-2019 ===
Group 11 Premiers
Year	1st Grade	Reserve Grade	Under 18s	N/A
1946	Wellington			N/A
1947	Canowindra			N/A
1948	Wellington			N/A
1949	Dubbo	Dubbo		N/A
1950	Condobolin	Forbes	Forbes	N/A
1951	Peak Hill	Parkes	Parkes	N/A
1952	Narromine	Narromine	Parkes	N/A
1953	Narromine	Cumnock	Dubbo	N/A
1954	Parkes	Parkes	Parkes	N/A
1955	Narromine	Parkes	Dubbo	N/A
1956	Narromine	Dubbo	Condobolin	N/A
1957	Condobolin	Dubbo	Dubbo	N/A
1958	Forbes	Parkes	Wellington	N/A
1959	Dubbo Macquarie	Wellington	Dubbo Macquarie	N/A
1960	Dubbo Macquarie	Wellington	Dubbo CYMS	N/A
1961	Dubbo Macquarie	Dubbo Macquarie	Dubbo CYMS	N/A
1962	Forbes	Forbes	Parkes	N/A
1963	Eugowra	Condobolin	Condobolin	N/A
1964	Eugowra	Dubbo Macquarie	Dubbo Macquarie	N/A
1965	Eugowra	Dubbo Macquarie	Canowindra	N/A
1966	Eugowra	Dubbo CYMS	Parkes	N/A
1967	Eugowra	Parkes	Eugowra	N/A
1968	Narromine	Eugowra	Canowindra	N/A
1969	Dubbo CYMS	Dubbo CYMS	Dubbo Macquarie	N/A
1970	Forbes	Dubbo CYMS	Dubbo Macquarie	N/A
1971	Dubbo CYMS	Dubbo CYMS	Dubbo CYMS	N/A
1972	Parkes	Dubbo Macquarie	Dubbo CYMS	N/A
1973	Parkes	Dubbo CYMS	Dubbo CYMS	N/A
1974	Narromine	Dubbo Macquarie	Dubbo Macquarie	N/A
1975	Dubbo CYMS	Forbes	Dubbo Macquarie	N/A
1976	Narromine	Dubbo Macquarie	Dubbo CYMS	N/A
1977	Forbes	Dubbo Macquarie	Dubbo Macquarie	N/A
1978	Dubbo Macquarie	Dubbo Macquarie	Dubbo CYMS	N/A
1979	Dubbo Macquarie	Dubbo Macquarie	Dubbo Macquarie	N/A
1980	Narromine	Dubbo CYMS	Dubbo Macquarie	N/A
1981	Dubbo Westside	Narromine	Narromine	N/A
1982	Dubbo Westside	Dubbo Macquarie	Dubbo Macquarie	N/A
1983	Parkes	Dubbo Macquarie	Wellington	N/A
1984	Parkes	Parkes	Dubbo Westside	N/A
1985	Dubbo Macquarie	Parkes	Dubbo Macquarie	N/A
1986	Dubbo CYMS	Dubbo CYMS	Forbes	N/A
1987	Forbes	Dubbo CYMS	Dubbo Macquarie	N/A
1988	Parkes	Dubbo CYMS	Dubbo Macquarie	N/A
1989	Gilgandra	Wellington	Dubbo CYMS	N/A
1990	Wellington	Cobar	Cobar	N/A
1991	Wellington	Dubbo CYMS	Dubbo Macquarie	N/A
1992	Wellington	Dubbo Macquarie	Forbes	N/A
1993	Cobar	Dubbo Macquarie	Parkes	N/A
1994	Wellington	Dubbo CYMS	Dubbo CYMS	N/A
1995	Narromine	Dubbo CYMS	Wellington	N/A
1996	Parkes	Parkes	Wellington	N/A
1997	Cobar	Cobar	Parkes	N/A
1998	Cobar	Cobar	Narromine	N/A
1999	Manildra	Wellington	Forbes	N/A
2000	Dubbo Macquarie	Dubbo CYMS	Narromine	N/A
2001	Dubbo CYMS	Forbes	Dubbo CYMS	N/A
2002	Dubbo CYMS	Dubbo CYMS	Narromine	N/A
2003	Dubbo CYMS	Narromine	Narromine	N/A
2004	Dubbo CYMS	Dubbo CYMS	Narromine	N/A
2005	Narromine	Dubbo CYMS	Dubbo CYMS	N/A
2006	Cobar	Dubbo Macquarie	Narromine	N/A
2007	Dubbo CYMS	Dubbo CYMS	Forbes	N/A
2008	Dubbo Macquarie	Dubbo CYMS	Dubbo Macquarie	N/A
2009	Dubbo CYMS	Parkes	Dubbo CYMS	N/A
League Tag Instituted 2010
Year	1st Grade	Reserve Grade	Under 18s	Ladies League Tag
2010	Parkes			
2011	Dubbo CYMS			
2012	Dubbo Macquarie			
2013	Parkes	Dubbo CYMS	Dubbo CYMS	Dubbo CYMS
2014	Dubbo CYMS	Nyngan	Forbes	
2015	Dubbo CYMS	Dubbo Westside		Dubbo Westside
2016	Forbes	Dubbo CYMS	Wellington	
2017	Dubbo CYMS	Nyngan	Forbes	Dubbo CYMS
2018	Forbes	Dubbo CYMS	Forbes	Parkes
2019	Wellington	Wellington	Forbes	Dubbo CYMS

== First Grade grand final results ==
Season	Premiers	Score	Runners-up	Grand final host	Minor premiers	Teams
1946	Wellington		Forbes			
1947	Canowindra		Forbes			13
1948	Wellington		Forbes	Dubbo	Wellington	
1949	Dubbo		Forbes	Dubbo		
1950	Condobolin	16–6	Dubbo	Forbes	Condobolin	
1951	Peak Hill		Wellington			
1952	Dubbo	19–9	Parkes	Narromine		8
1953	Narromine	25–8	Wellington	Dubbo	Narromine	8
1954	Parkes	11–5	Narromine	Parkes		8
1955	Narromine		Wellington	Dubbo		
1956	Narromine	16–7	Dubbo	Dubbo	Condobolin	
1957	Condobolin		Parkes			
1958	Forbes		Cumnock			
1959	Macquarie		Narromine	Wellington		9
1960	Macquarie		Forbes	Dubbo		9
1961	Macquarie		Forbes			9
1962	Forbes		Wellington			
1963	Eugowra	13–10	Forbes	Parkes		
1964	Eugowra	8–7	Forbes	Parkes		
1965	Eugowra	28–2	Narromine			
1966	Eugowra	22–3	Canowindra	Parkes		
1967	Eugowra	14–3	Parkes	Parkes	Eugowra	
1968	Narromine	12–4	CYMS	Parkes		
1969	CYMS		Parkes	Dubbo	Parkes	
1970	Forbes	7–3	CYMS	Dubbo	CYMS	
1971	CYMS	23–20	Parkes			
1972	Parkes		Macquarie			
1973	Parkes		Canowindra			8
1974	Narromine		CYMS			
1975	CYMS		Macquarie			
1976	Narromine		Macquarie	Dubbo		
1977	Forbes		Macquarie			
1978	Macquarie		Narromine			
1979	Macquarie		Parkes			
1980	Narromine		Macquarie			
1981	Westside		Macquarie			
1982	Westside		Narromine			
1983	Parkes		Wellington			8
1984	Parkes		Westside			
1985	Macquarie		Westside			
1986	CYMS		Forbes			
1987	Forbes		Narromine			
1988	Parkes		Macquarie			
1989	Gilgandra		Westside			
1990	Wellington		Cobar			
1991	Wellington		Forbes			
1992	Wellington		Forbes			
1993	Cobar		Wellington			
1994	Wellington		Parkes			8
1995	Narromine		CYMS			
1996	Parkes		Narromine			8
1997	Cobar		Parkes			9
1998	Cobar		Parkes			9
1999	Manildra		Cobar			
2000	Macquarie		Narromine			
2001	CYMS		Forbes			
2002	CYMS		Narromine			
2003	CYMS		Forbes			
2004	CYMS		Forbes			
2005	Narromine		Wellington			
2006	Cobar		Wellington			
2007	CYMS		Macquarie	Dubbo		
2008	Macquarie		CYMS			
2009	CYMS		Parkes			
2010	Parkes		Wellington			
2011	CYMS		Parkes	Parkes	Parkes	
2012	Macquarie		CYMS	Dubbo	Macquarie	
2013	Parkes		CYMS	Dubbo	CYMS	
2014	CYMS		Parkes	Dubbo	CYMS	
2015	CYMS		Parkes	Dubbo	CYMS	
2016	Forbes		CYMS	Dubbo	CYMS	
2017	CYMS		Nyngan	Dubbo	CYMS	
2018	Forbes		CYMS	Dubbo	CYMS	
2019	Wellington		CYMS	Dubbo	CYMS	

== Junior Competition ==
=== Group 11 JRL ===
The following clubs participate in the Group 11 Junior League. Where applicable, the club's differing Senior side/competition is listed.

==== Lachlan District JRL ====
- Cabonne United Roos (Molong and Manildra, Woodbridge Cup)
- Canowindra Tigers (Woodbridge Cup)
- Condobolin Rams JRL (Woodbridge Cup)
- Forbes Magpies
- Grenfell Goannas (Woodbridge Cup)
- Parkes Marist (Spacemen)
- Red Bend College Blues (No seniors)
- West Wyalong JRL (Group 20)

==== Dubbo District JRL ====
- Cobar Roosters JRL (Castlereagh Cup)
- Narromine Jets Juniors (Castlereagh Cup)
- Nyngan Tigers JRL
- South Dubbo Raiders (Dubbo Macquarie)
- St Johns Dubbo (No Seniors)
- Warren Bulldogs (No Seniors)
- Wellington Cowboys JRL

=== Notable Juniors ===
Dubbo

- Matt Burton (2019-21 Penrith Panthers) (2022- Canterbury-Bankstown Bulldogs)
- Isaah Yeo (2014- Penrith Panthers)
- Bernard Wilson (1995 South Sydney Rabbitohs) (1996-97 Balmain Tigers)
- Justin Yeo (1998 North Sydney Bears) (1999 Balmain Tigers)
- David Peachey (1994-05 Cronulla-Sutherland Sharks) (2006-07 South Sydney Rabbitohs)
- Kaide Ellis (2018-19 Penrith Panthers) (2020- St George-Illawarra Dragons)
- Dean Pay (1989-1995 Canterbury-Bankstown Bulldogs) (1996-99 Parramatta Eels)
- Andrew Ryan (rugby league) (2000-02 Parramatta Eels) (2003-11 Canterbury-Bankstown Bulldogs
- Mark Soden (1989-99 North Sydney Bears)
- Wes Maas (2002 South Sydney Rabbitohs)
- Kel Brown (1971-73 Eastern Suburbs)
- Rex Bassingthwaighte (2026- Sydney Roosters)
- Aston Warwick (2026- Sydney Roosters)

Forbes Magpies

- Charlie Staines (2020-22 Penrith Panthers) (2023-25 Wests Tigers) (2026- Catalans Dragons)
- David Schrader (1999 Canberra Raiders)
- Damian Kennedy (1995-98 Western Suburbs Magpies) (1999-2000 Canberra Raiders)
- Josh Miller (rugby league) (2004–11) Canberra Raiders) (2012 St. George Illawarra Dragons)
- Joel Thompson* (2008-13 Canberra Raiders) (2014-17 St. George Illawarra Dragons) (2018-20 Manly Warringah Sea Eagles)
- Bryan Norrie* (2004-05 St. George Illawarra Dragons) (2006-07 Penrith Panthers) (2008-09 Cronulla-Sutherland Sharks) (2010-14 Melbourne Storm)
- Jason Darcy (1994 Balmain Tigers)
- Adrian Toole (1985-1995 North Sydney Bears)
- Chris Anderson (rugby)* (1971-84 Canterbury-Bankstown Bulldogs)
- Billy Phillips* (2025- Penrith Panthers)
- Pat Gibson (rugby league)* (2002-04 Cronulla-Sutherland Sharks)
- Jai Field (2017-19 St. George Illawarra Dragons) (2020 Parramatta Eels) (2021 Wigan Warriors)

Parkes Spacemen

- Billy Burns (2019-21 Penrith Panthers) (2021-23 St George-Illawarra Dragons) (2024- Cronulla-Sutherland Sharks)
- Darby Medlyn (2020 Canberra Raiders)
- Mike Leary (1968-72 Penrith Panthers) (1973 Parramatta Eels)
- Ben Lovett (2023-25 South Sydney Rabbitohs)
- James Pritchard (2001-17 Rugby Union)
- Elizabeth Macgregor (2025- Canterbury-Bankstown Bulldogs)

Wellington Cowboys

- Kotoni Staggs (2018- Brisbane Broncos)
- Tyrone Peachey (2013 Cronulla-Sutherland Sharks) (2014-18 2023-24 Penrith Panthers) (2019-21 Gold Coast Titans) (2022 Wests Tigers)
- Blake Ferguson (2009-10 Cronulla-Sutherland Sharks) (2011-13 Canberra Raiders) (2015-18 Sydney Roosters) (2019-21 Parramatta Eels)
- Trent Runciman (1998 Canterbury-Bankstown Bulldogs) (2001-2002 Wests Tigers)
- Brent Naden (2019-21 Penrith Panthers) (2022 Canterbury-Bankstown Bulldogs) (2022- Wests Tigers)
- Paul Shaw 1986-1989 1994 Manly Warringah Sea Eagles) (1990-91 Gold Coast Seagulls)
- Blaine Stanley (1998–2000) Cronulla-Sutherland Sharks (2002 South Sydney Rabbitohs)
- Mick Peachey (1994 South Sydney Rabbitohs)
- Preston Conn (2026- Melbourne Storm)

Nyghan Tigers

- Justin Carney (2008-10 Canberra Raiders) (2011-12 Sydney Roosters)
- Les Boyd (1976-79 Western Suburbs Magpies) (1980-84 Manly Warringah Sea Eagles)
- Lance Thompson (rugby league, born 1961) (1980 Balmain Tigers) (1983 Newtown Jets)
- Fletcher Hunt (2025- Newcastle Knights)

== Other notable players (non-juniors) ==
Dubbo Cyms

- Eparama Navale (1997-98 Parramatta Eels) (2000 Northern Eagles)
- Joe Williams (2004-07 South Sydney Rabbitohs) (2008 Penrith Panthers) (2008 Canterbury-Bankstown Bulldogs)
- Jayson Bukuya* (2008–13, 2015-19Cronulla-Sutherland Sharks) (2014 One New Zealand Warriors)
- Isaac Gordon (2010-12 Cronulla-Sutherland Sharks)
- Ilisoni Vonomateiratu (2006-08 Fiji)

Dubbo Macquarie

- Liam Fulton (2003–08, 2010-14 Wests Tigers)
- Andrew Hunter (1997-98 Manly Warringah Sea Eagles)
- Joshua Toole (2012-2014 Ireland)
- Justin Carney (2008-10 Canberra Raiders) (2011-12 Sydney Roosters)

Forbes

- Mark Bevan (1986-87 Penrith Panthers) (1988 Western Suburbs Magpies)
- Ted Goodwin (1972-1978 St. George Dragons) (1979 Newtown Jets) (1980-82 Western Suburbs Magpies)
- Ian Walsh (rugby league) (1962-67 St. George Dragons)
- Jason Hoogerwerf (1988-1990 St. George Dragons) (1991 Newcastle Knights)
- Wally Fullerton Smith (1987-92 St. George Dragons)
- Joshua Toole (2012-2014 Ireland)
- Pio Seci (2022 Manly Warringah Sea Eagles)
- Alvin Maungaati (2023 Cook Islands)

Parkes

- Dennis Moran (rugby league) (1997-00 Parramatta Eels)
- Jack Buchanan (2013-16 Wests Tigers)
- Heamani Lavaka (2007-08 Melbourne Rebels)
- Ted Goodwin (1972-1978 St. George Dragons) (1979 Newtown Jets) (1980-82 Western Suburbs Magpies)
- Ian Walsh (rugby league) (1962-67 St. George Dragons)
- Paul Upfield (1984-88 Illawarra Steelers) (1989 St. George Dragons) (1990-91 Balmain Tigers)
- Benjamin John (2007-10 Papua New Guinea)
- Tikiko Noke (2015 Fiji)
- Ilisoni Vonomateiratu (2006-08 Fiji)
- Joel Caine (1998 St. George Dragons) (1999 Balmain Tigers) (2000-03 Wests Tigers)

=== Wellington ===
- Dennis Moran (rugby league) (1997-00 Parramatta Eels)
- Travis Waddell (2009-12 Canberra Raiders) (2013-14 Newcastle Knights) (2016-17 Brisbane Broncos)
- Timana Tahu (1999-04, 2012-14 Newcastle Knights) (2005–07, 2010 Parramatta Eels) (2011 Penrith Panthers)
- Joe Williams (2004-07 South Sydney Rabbitohs) (2008 Penrith Panthers) (2008 Canterbury-Bankstown Bulldogs)

Nyghan

- Stewart Mills (2011-13 Cronulla-Sutherland Sharks)
- Constantine Mika (2009-11 Newcastle Knights)
- Vincent Leuluai (2016 Sydney Roosters) (2017 Melbourne Storm)

== Key ==
- Chris Anderson (rugby)* = attended Red Bend Catholic College
- Joel Thompson* = attented Red Bend Catholic College
- Billy Phillips* = attended Red Bend Catholic College
- Pat Gibson (rugby league)* = attended Red Bend Catholic College

== See also ==
- Woodbridge Cup
- Peter McDonald Premiership
- Rugby League Competitions in Australia
