= 2024 State of Origin series =

Australian rugby league series

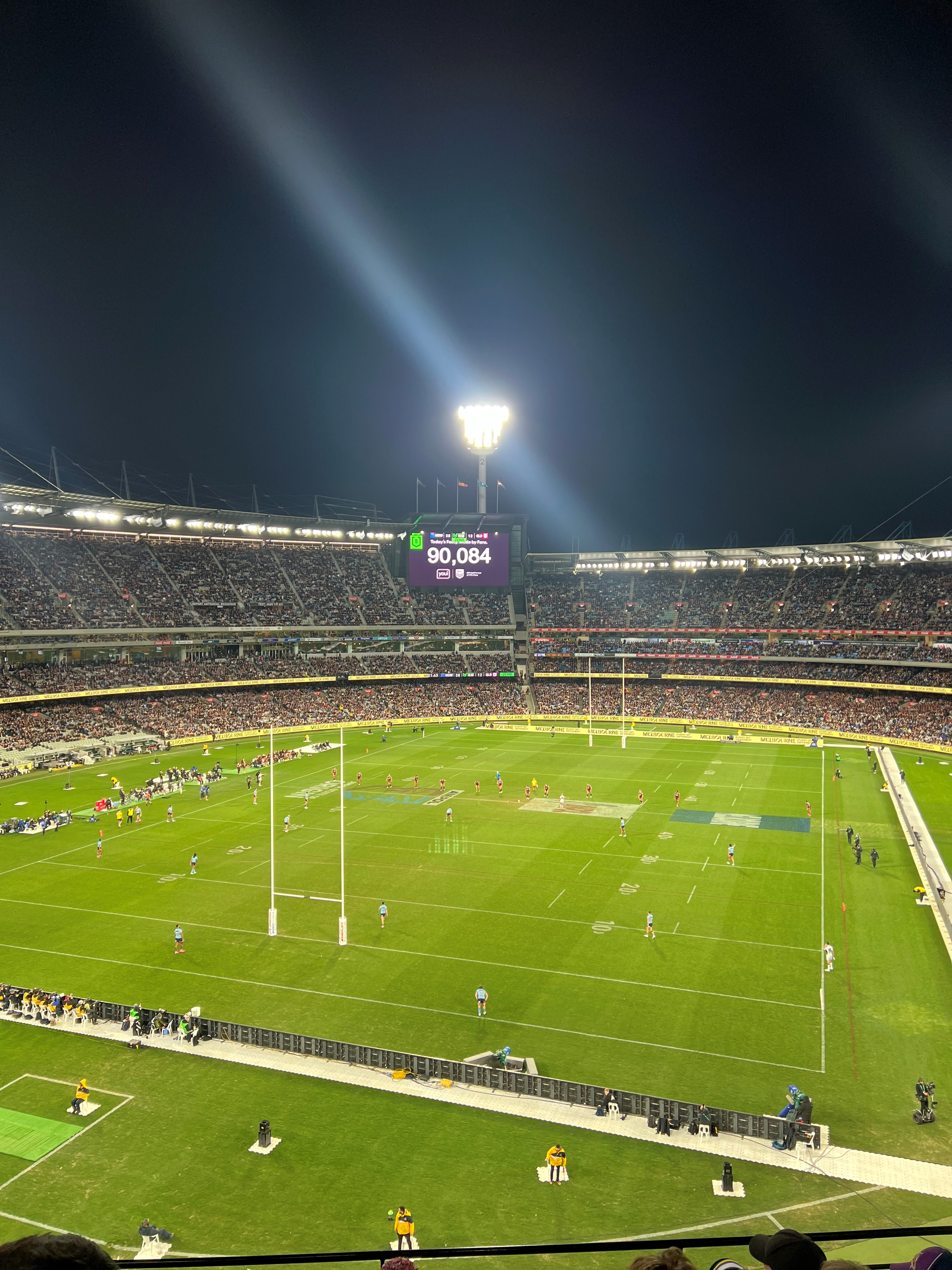
- The Game II of the series in Melbourne
- Won by: New South Wales (17th title)
- Series margin: 2–1
- Points scored: 122
- Attendance: 219,755 (ave. 73,252 per match)
- Player of the series: Angus Crichton (Wally Lewis Medal)
- Top points scorer(s): Zac Lomax (28)
- Top try scorer(s): Hamiso Tabuai-Fidow (4)

The 2024 State of Origin series was the 43rd annual best-of-three series between the Queensland and New South Wales rugby league teams. Before this series, Queensland had won 24 times, NSW 16 times, with two series drawn.

== Game I ==
Game I was held at Accor Stadium in Sydney.

Michael Maguire made his Origin coaching debut for New South Wales.

After initially missing selection, former New South Wales captain James Tedesco was a late inclusion after an injury to fullback Dylan Edwards.

The result was a foregone conclusion when Joseph Sua'ali'i was sent off in the 8th minute for a high hit on Reece Walsh. Sua'ali'i's shoulder made direct contact with Walsh's head knocking him out and ruling him out of the match with a HIA 1 concussion. Sua'ali'i was subsequently charged with a grade two reckless high tackle offence.

The 38–10 score was Queensland's biggest ever win in Sydney. Hamiso Tabuai-Fidow scored a hat-trick of tries, the first Queenslander to do this since Valentine Holmes in Game 3 of 2017.

5 June 2024
20:05 AEST

New South Wales	10–38	Queensland
Tries: 2 Tedesco 13'; Lomax 43'; Goals: 1 Hynes 1/2 15'; Sent off: Sua'ali'i (red card) 8'	1st: 6–20; 2nd: 4–18; Report	Tries: 6 Hunt 4', 66'; Tabuai-Fidow 18', 23', 78'; Coates 70'; Goals: 7 Holmes 7/7 6', pen 9', 19', 24', 67', 71', 79'

Accor Stadium, Sydney
Attendance: 77,214
Referee: Ashley Klein
Player of the Match: Daly Cherry-Evans

== Game II ==
Game II was at Melbourne Cricket Ground in Melbourne. NSW burst out of the blocks going to a 34–0 half time lead. Queensland bounced back in the second half, but the result was a foregone conclusion.

26 June 2024
20:05 AEST

New South Wales	38–18	Queensland
Tries: 7 Martin 10'; To'o 17', 26'; Lomax 23', 38'; Mitchell 32'; Edwards 61'; Goals: 5 Lomax 5/7 12', 19', 27', 33', 39'; Sin bin: Martin (yellow card) 50' to 60'	1st: 34–0; 2nd: 4–18; Report	Tries: 3 Nanai 53'; Tabuai-Fidow 58'; Taulagi 67'; Goals: 3 Holmes 3/3 54', 59', 68'; Sin bin: Carrigan (yellow card) 50' to 60'

Melbourne Cricket Ground, Melbourne
Attendance: 90,084
Referee: Ashley Klein
Player of the Match: Mitchell Moses

== Game III ==
Game III was held at Suncorp Stadium in Brisbane. The first half was a low-scoring affair with Queensland going into half time with a 2-0 lead courtesy of a successful penalty taken by Valentine Holmes. In the second half the close scoring game continued until New South Wales broke the game open with two converted tries scored in quick succession by Bradman Best and Mitchell Moses. With a two games to one finish to the series, New South Wales lifted the 2024 State of Origin Shield, the first series-deciding win by New South Wales in Queensland since 2005. Angus Crichton was named the recipient of the Wally Lewis Medal.

A melee near the Queensland bench area in the 30th minute resulted in Jeremiah Nanai (Queensland) and Cameron Murray (New South Wales) being sent to the sin bin by referee Ashley Klein. Both players were later charged with grade two contrary conduct charges by the NRL Judiciary. Additionally, New South Wales reserve player Haumole Olakau'atu was sent off after entering the field of play to engage in the melee. Olakau'atu was charged with a grade three contrary conduct charge for his part in the melee. In total nine players were charged with offences from the melee, while Kurt Capewell (Queensland) was charged following two separate incidents in the first half.

17 July 2024
20:05 AEST

Queensland	4–14	New South Wales
Tries: 0 Goals: 2 Holmes 2/2 pen 40', pen 61'; Sin bin: Nanai (yellow card) 30' to 40'	1st: 2–0; 2nd: 2–14; Report	Tries: 2 Best 64'; Moses 67'; Goals: 3 Lomax 3/3 pen 45', 66', 69'; Sin bin: Murray (yellow card) 30' to 40'

Suncorp Stadium, Brisbane
Attendance: 52,457
Referee: Ashley Klein
Player of the Match: Dylan Edwards

== Teams ==
=== New South Wales Blues ===
Position	Game 1	Game 2	Game 3
Fullback	James Tedesco	Dylan Edwards	
Wing	Brian To'o		
Centre	Joseph Sua'ali'i	Latrell Mitchell	Bradman Best
Centre	Stephen Crichton		
Wing	Zac Lomax		
Five-eighth	Jarome Luai		
Halfback	Nicho Hynes	Mitchell Moses	
Prop	Jake Trbojevic (c)		
Hooker	Reece Robson		
Prop	Payne Haas		
Second row	Liam Martin		
Second row	Angus Crichton		
Lock	Cameron McInnes	Cameron Murray	
Interchange	Hudson Young	Connor Watson	
Interchange	Isaah Yeo		
Interchange	Haumole Olakau'atu		Mitchell Barnett
Interchange	Spencer Leniu		
Replacement	Matt Burton	Mitchell Barnett	Matt Burton
Reserve	Luke Keary	Cameron McInnes	Haumole Olakau'atu
Reserve	Mitchell Barnett	Luke Keary	Joseph Sua'ali'i
Coach	Michael Maguire		

=== Queensland Maroons ===
Position	Game 1	Game 2	Game 3
Fullback	Reece Walsh		
Wing	Xavier Coates		Selwyn Cobbo
Centre	Valentine Holmes		Dane Gagai
Centre	Hamiso Tabuai-Fidow		
Wing	Murray Taulagi		Valentine Holmes
Five-eighth	Tom Dearden		
Halfback	Daly Cherry-Evans (c)		
Prop	Reuben Cotter		Moeaki Fotuaika
Hooker	Ben Hunt		Harry Grant
Prop	Lindsay Collins		Felise Kaufusi
Second row	Jaydn Su'a		Reuben Cotter
Second row	Jeremiah Nanai		Kurt Capewell
Lock	Patrick Carrigan		
Interchange	Harry Grant		Ben Hunt
Interchange	Moeaki Fotuaika		Lindsay Collins
Interchange	J'maine Hopgood	Felise Kaufusi	Jeremiah Nanai
Interchange	Selwyn Cobbo	Kurt Capewell	Kalyn Ponga
Replacement	Felise Kaufusi	Dane Gagai	Trent Loiero
Reserve	Brendan Piakura	Heilum Luki	Brendan Piakura
Reserve	Ezra Mam	Trent Loiero	Reed Mahoney
Coach	Billy Slater		

=== Debutants ===
Game I

- Cap no. 311, Joseph Sua'ali'i
- Cap no. 312, Zac Lomax
- Cap no. 313, Cameron McInnes
- Cap no. 314, Haumole Olakau'atu
- Cap no. 315, Spencer Leniu
- Cap no. 231, J'maine Hopgood

Game II

- Cap no. 316, Dylan Edwards
- Cap no. 317, Connor Watson

Game III

- Cap no. 318, Mitchell Barnett

== Men's Under 19 State of Origin ==
20 June 2024
19:45 AEST

New South Wales	14–10	Queensland
Tries: 3 Stewart 6'; Votano 29'; Arthur 58'; Goals: 1 Elliott 1/3 7'	1st: 10–6; 2nd: 4–4; Report	Tries: 2 Armstrong 21'; Tait 44'; Goals: 1 Black 1/2 23'

Leichhardt Oval, Sydney
Attendance: 5,268
Referee: Wyatt Raymond
Player of the Match: Chevy Stewart

Team details

FB	1	Chevy Stewart
WG	2	Jesse McLean
CE	3	Casey McLean
CE	4	Hayden Buchanan
WG	5	Michael Gabrael
FE	6	Jake Elliott
HB	7	Mitchell Woods
PR	8	Loko Jnr Pasifiki Tonga
HK	9	Matthew Arthur
PR	10	Fanafou Seve
SR	11	Jermaine McEwen
SR	12	Noah Martin
LF	19	Cody Hopwood
Interchange:
IN	15	Jacob Halangahu
IN	16	Kaiden Lahrs
IN	17	Sam Tuivaiti
IN	18	Connor Votano
CS	14	Zane Harrison
Coach: Andrew Ryan

FB	1	Jaxon Purdue
WG	2	Israel Leota
CE	3	LJ Nonu
CE	4	Sam Stephenson
WG	5	Tyreece Tait
FE	6	Stanley Huen
HB	7	Coby Black
PR	15	Beni Allen
HK	9	Cameron Bukowski
PR	10	De La Salle Va'a
SR	11	Zac Garton
SR	12	Jamal Shibasaki
LK	13	Mason Kira
Interchange:
IN	14	Mutua Brown
IN	16	Lewis Symonds
IN	17	Harry Armstrong
IN	19	Amare Milford
CS	20	Reece Foley
Coach: Ben Te'o

== Women's State of Origin ==
The 2024 Women's State of Origin was the first time that the competition was played as a three-game series. On 16 May, New South Wales won the opening game 22–12 at Suncorp Stadium, Brisbane. On 6 June, Queensland levelled the series with a 11–10 win at McDonald Jones Stadium, Newcastle. On 27 June, Queensland won the decider 22–6 at Queensland Country Bank Stadium, Townsville, for a 2–1 series win. The under-19s game, which was played as a double-header with the men's under-19s game, was won 46–4 by New South Wales.

== Wheelchair State Challenge ==
13 July 2024
15:00 AEST

Queensland	42–36	New South Wales
Tries: 7 Schumacher 42', 51', 57'; Anstey 1 Bazley 1 Gawthorne 1 McKenna 1 Goals: 7 McKenna 6 Schumacher 1	1st: 14–26; 2nd: 28–10; Report	Tries: 7; 2 Grove; 2 Karim; 1 Chemaissem; 1 Engles; 1 Popple; Goals: 4; 3 Karim; 1 Chemaissem

South Pine Sports Centre, Brisbane
Player of the Match: Zac Schumacher

== See also ==
- 2024 NRL season
- 2024 NRL Women's season
