= Zane Harrison =

Australian rugby league footballer (born 2006)

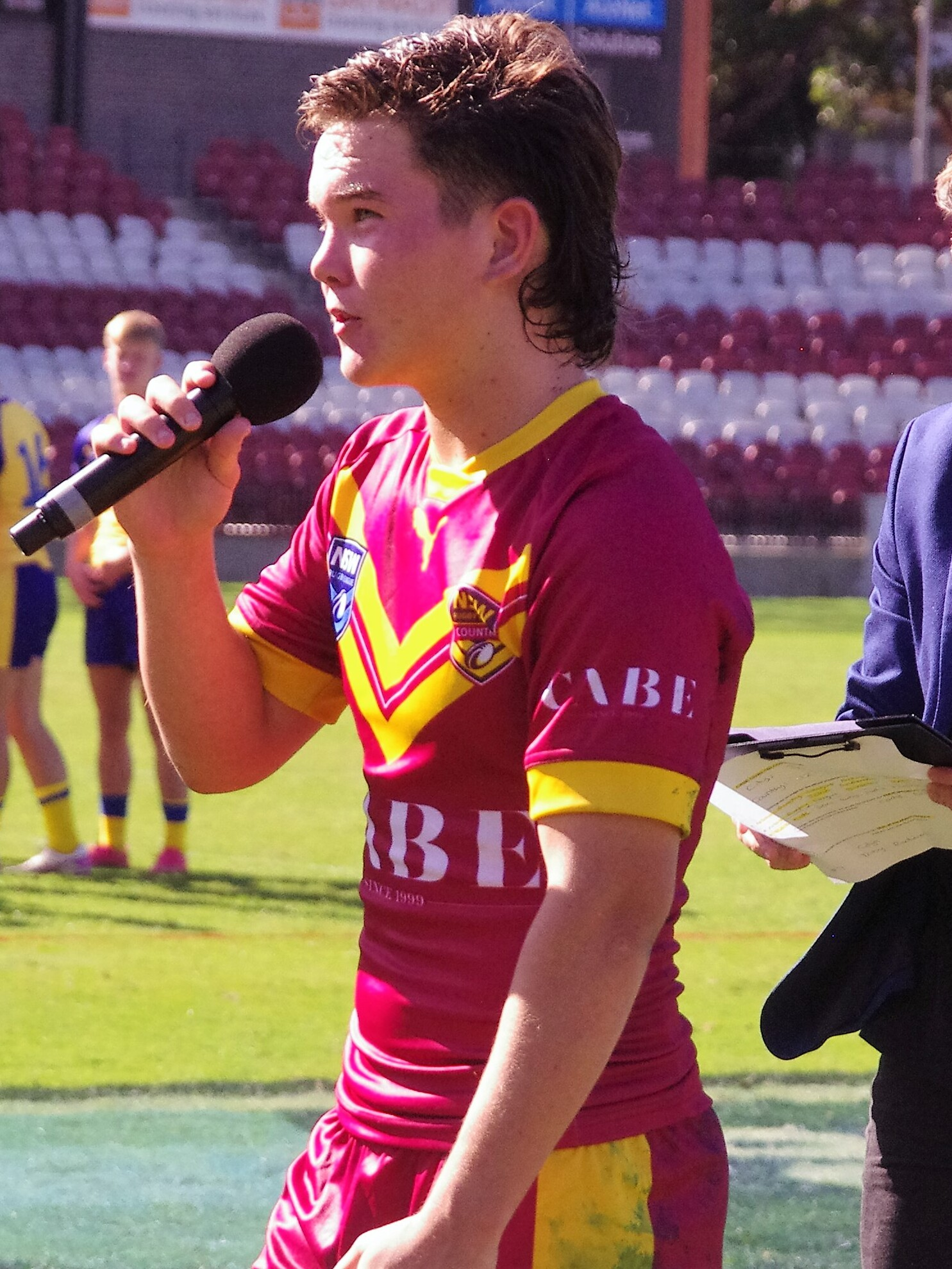

Personal information
- Full name: Zane Harrison
- Born: 22 March 2006 (age 20) Tweed Heads, New South Wales, Australia
- Height: 176 cm (5 ft 9 in)
- Weight: 84 kg (13 st 3 lb)

Playing information
- Position: Halfback
Club
Years	Team	Pld	T	G	FG	P
2026–	Gold Coast Titans	11	0	0	1	1
- Source: As of 22 November 2026

Zane Harrison (born 22 March 2006) is an Australian rugby league footballer who plays as a halfback for the Gold Coast Titans in the NRL.

== Background ==
Zane Harrison was born in Tweed Heads, New South Wales on 22 March 2006. In his youth, he idolised Johnathan Thurston and Nathan Cleary.

He spent his junior years playing for the Northern Rivers Titans and the Tweed Seagulls.

== Playing career ==
=== Early career ===
Harrison had his Queensland Cup debut at the Tweed Heads Seagulls on 5 April 2025, against the Papua New Guinea Hunters.

He also represented New South Wales in the U19 State of Origin.

=== 2026 ===
Zane Harrison made his official NRL debut for the Gold Coast Titans on 8 May 2026, in a 28–12 loss to the Sydney Roosters in Round 10.

In Round 16, Harrison scored the winning field goal, with the Titans beating a depleted Penrith Panthers team 19-18.

On 29 October 2026, the Titans announced that Harrison had re-signed with the club until the end of 2029.

== Statistics ==
As of 24 July 2026

Year	Team	Games	Tries	Goals	FGs	Pts
2026	Gold Coast Titans	11			1	1
2027	Gold Coast Titans					
	Totals	11	0	0	1	1
