= Isaah Yeo =

Australia international rugby league footballer

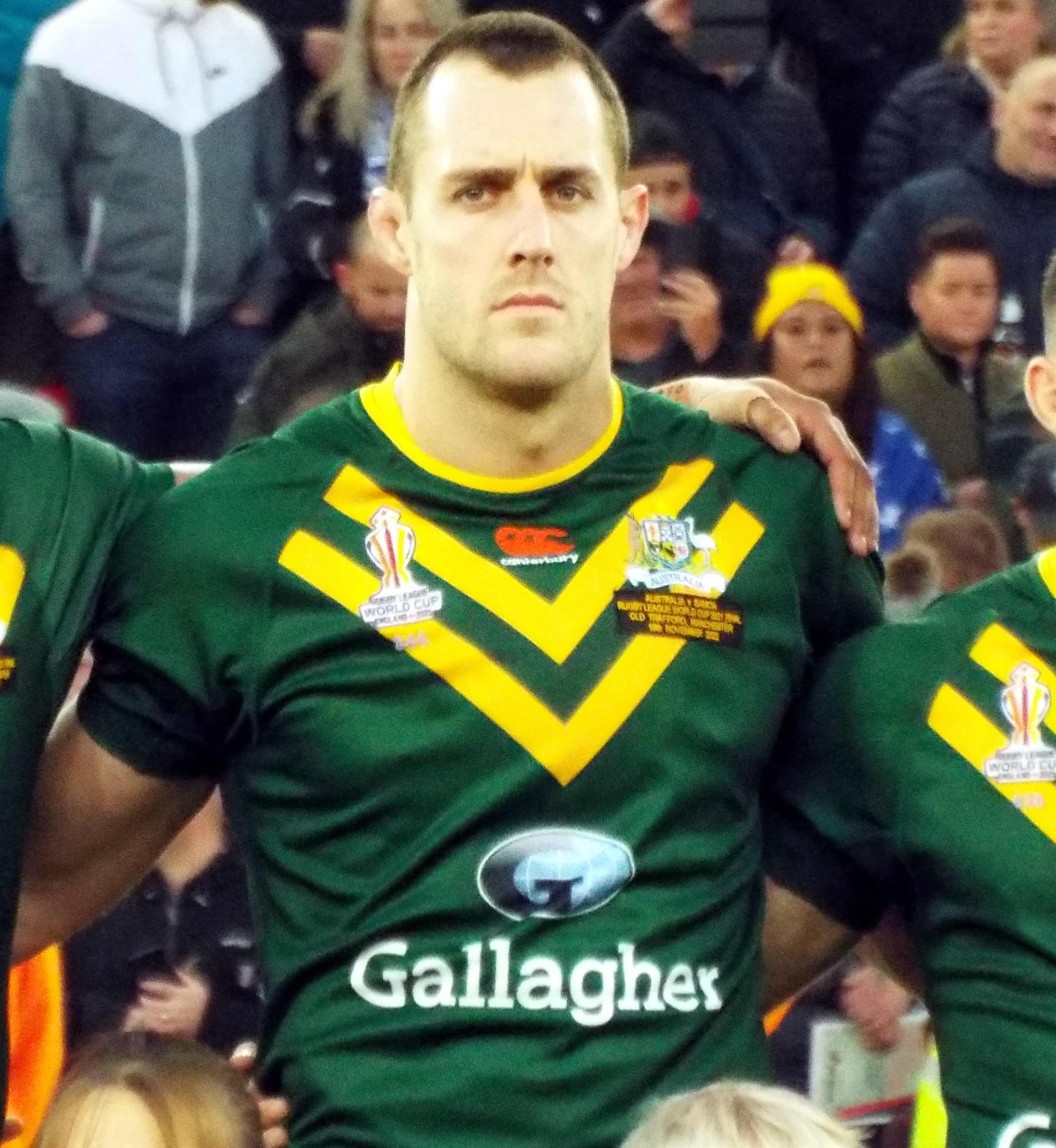

Personal information
- Full name: Isaah Patrick Ferguson-Yeo
- Born: 6 November 1994 (age 32) Dubbo, New South Wales, Australia
- Height: 195 cm (6 ft 5 in)
- Weight: 106 kg (16 st 10 lb)

Playing information
- Position: Lock, Second-row, Centre
Club
Years	Team	Pld	T	G	FG	P
2014–	Penrith Panthers	286	34	0	0	136
Representative
Years	Team	Pld	T	G	FG	P
2014	NSW Residents	1	1	0	0	4
2016	NSW Country	1	0	0	0	0
2020–26	New South Wales	20	0	0	0	0
2022–	Australia	17	2	0	0	8
- Source: As of 22 November 2026
- Father: Justin Yeo

Isaah Patrick Ferguson-Yeo (born 6 November 1994) is an Australian professional rugby league footballer who co-captains and plays as a lock forward for the Penrith Panthers in the NRL and captains New South Wales in State of Origin and Australia at international level.

Yeo was vice-captain of the Australia team that won the 2022 Rugby League World Cup and he has represented New South Wales Country. Yeo is a four time Premiership-winning Co-Captain of the 2021, 2022, 2023 and 2024 NRL Grand Finals with the Panthers. Yeo played as a second-row forward and centre earlier in his career before a full-time move to lock in 2020.

== Early life ==
Yeo was born in Dubbo, New South Wales, Australia. He is the son of former North Sydney Bears and Balmain Tigers player Justin Yeo.

Yeo was educated at the St Johns College, Dubbo and played his junior football for Dubbo CYMS, before being signed by the Penrith Panthers.

== Playing career ==
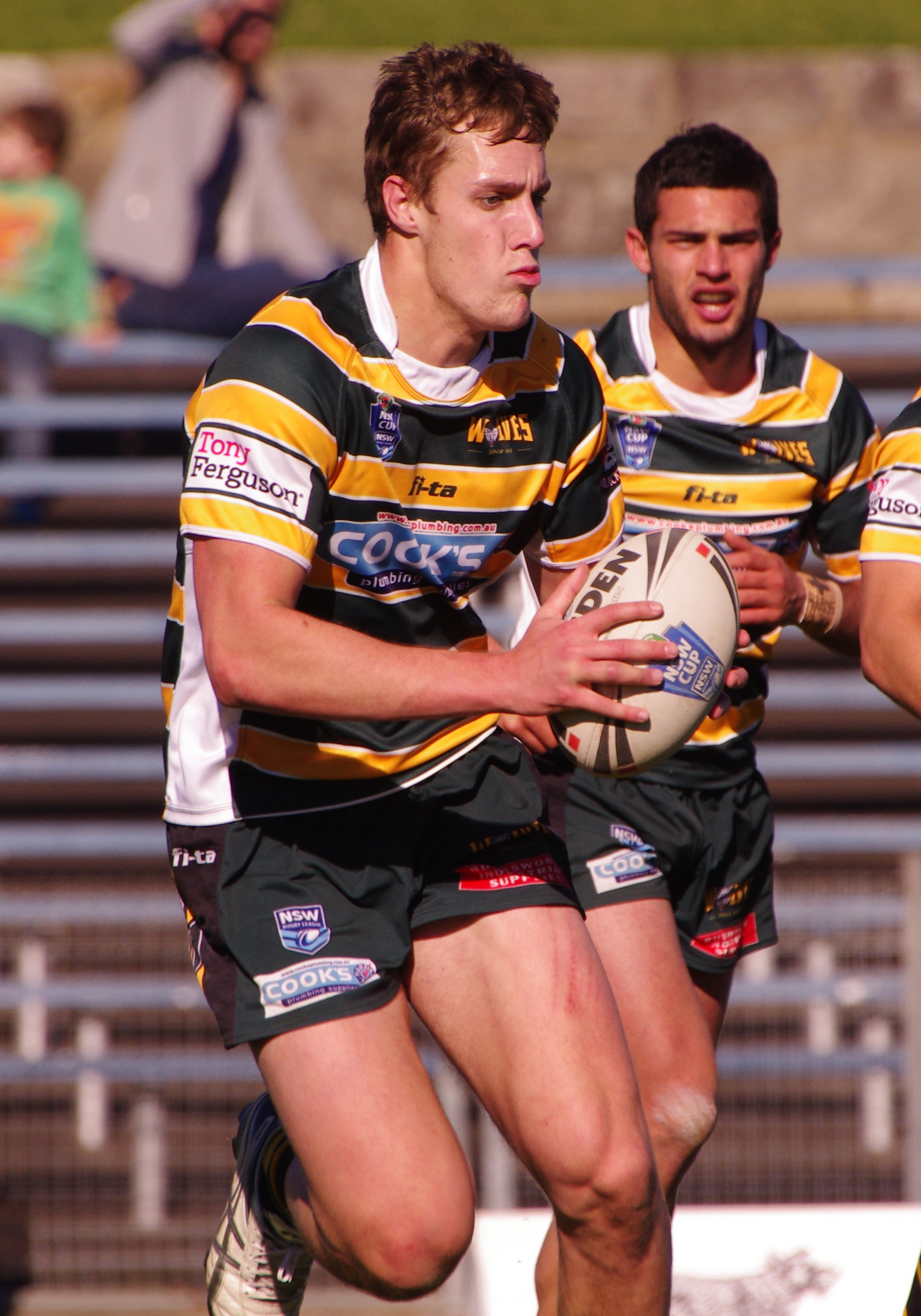
Yeo playing for the Windsor Wolves in 2013

Yeo played for Penrith's NYC team in 2013. Yeo played in Penrith's 2013 NYC Grand Final 42–30 win over the New Zealand Warriors.

=== 2014 ===
In round 1 of the 2014 NRL season, Yeo made his NRL debut for the Penrith club against Newcastle. Yeo scored his first career try in the Penrith club's 38–12 win over Parramatta in round 12. On 9 July 2014, Yeo was selected for the NSW residents team to play against the Queensland residents team at Suncorp Stadium. He played at centre and scored a try in the NSW 16–24 loss. Yeo finished his debut year in the NRL with him playing in 10 matches and scoring two tries.

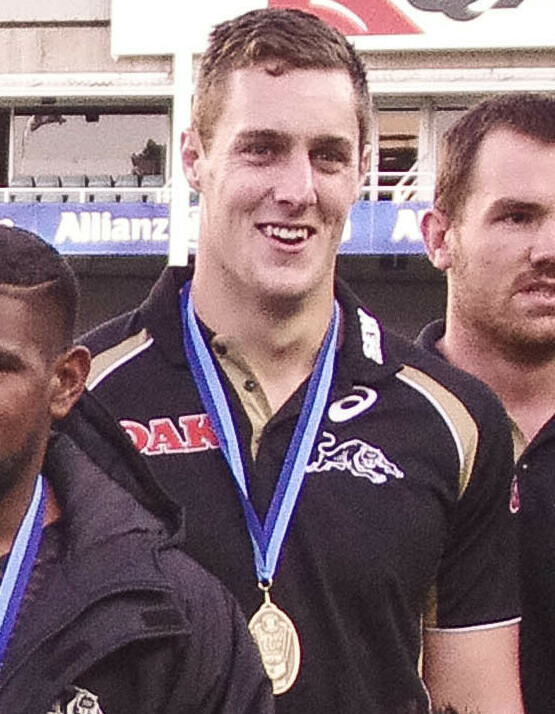
Yeo celebrating winning the NSW State Cup in 2014

=== 2015 ===
On 31 January and 1 February, Yeo played for Penrith in the 2015 NRL Auckland Nines. He finished off the 2015 season having played in 21 matches and scoring two tries for the Penrith club.

=== 2016 ===
In February 2016, Yeo was named in the Penrith's 2016 NRL Auckland Nines squad. On 11 February 2016, Yeo extended his contract with the Penrith club from the end of 2016 to the end of 2019. On 8 May 2016, Yeo played for New South Wales Country against New South Wales City, playing on the wing in the 30–44 loss in Tamworth. Yeo finished the 2016 NRL season with him playing in 26 matches and 5 tries for the Penrith club.

=== 2017 ===
In February 2017, Yeo was named as the captain of Penrith's 2017 NRL Auckland Nines squad, The Panthers were the runner-ups of the tournament, losing to the Sydney Roosters 10–8 in the final.

=== 2018 ===
Yeo made 26 appearances for Penrith and scored 4 tries in 2018 as the club finished 5th on the table at the end of the regular season. Penrith reached the second week of the finals for the third season running but were eliminated by the Cronulla-Sutherland Sharks 21–20 with Yeo scoring a try in the defeat.

=== 2019 ===
Yeo began the 2019 as one of Penrith's first choice second-rowers and played in the club's opening round loss against Parramatta. Yeo was taken from the field after being hit in a high tackle by Michael Jennings. The following week, Yeo scored a try in Penrith's victory over Newcastle but was taken from the field after suffering another concussion. In Round 8 against Canberra, Yeo was taken from the field with a shoulder injury during the club's 30–12 loss.

Yeo made a total of 18 appearances for Penrith in the 2019 NRL season as the club finished a disappointing 10th on the table and missed out on the finals for the first time since 2015.

=== 2020 ===
Yeo enjoyed his best year at Penrith in the 2020 NRL season as the club won the Minor Premiership and reached the 2020 NRL Grand Final. On 19 October, he was named Dally M Lock of the year. Yeo played in the grand final which Penrith lost 26–20 against Melbourne. Following the game, Yeo was named in the preliminary State of Origin side for New South Wales.

In Game 2 of the 2020 State of Origin series, Yeo made his debut off the bench for New South Wales in a 34–10 win. He was selected for Game 3 where New South Wales lost the game 20-14 and the series 2–1 against Queensland.

=== 2021 ===
During the 2021 pre-season, it was announced that Yeo would become co-captain alongside Nathan Cleary. This announcement came after the previous captain; James Tamou, departed the club for the Wests Tigers.

Yeo was selected in the 2021 State of Origin series at Lock for New South Wales. He played all three games in the series and was a part of the winning side as NSW reclaimed the Origin Shield.

On 25 September (alongside his Co-Captain Nathan Cleary), Yeo led the Penrith club to a 10-6 Preliminary Final victory over Melbourne, earning Penrith their second NRL Grand Final in two years.

On 27 September, Yeo was once again named Dally M Lock of the year for the second year in a row.

On 3 October, Yeo helped lead the Penrith club to their third premiership. With a final score of 14–12, Penrith held out a late barrage by South Sydney Yeo played all 80 minutes, making 168 metres, 57 post-contact metres and 36 tackles

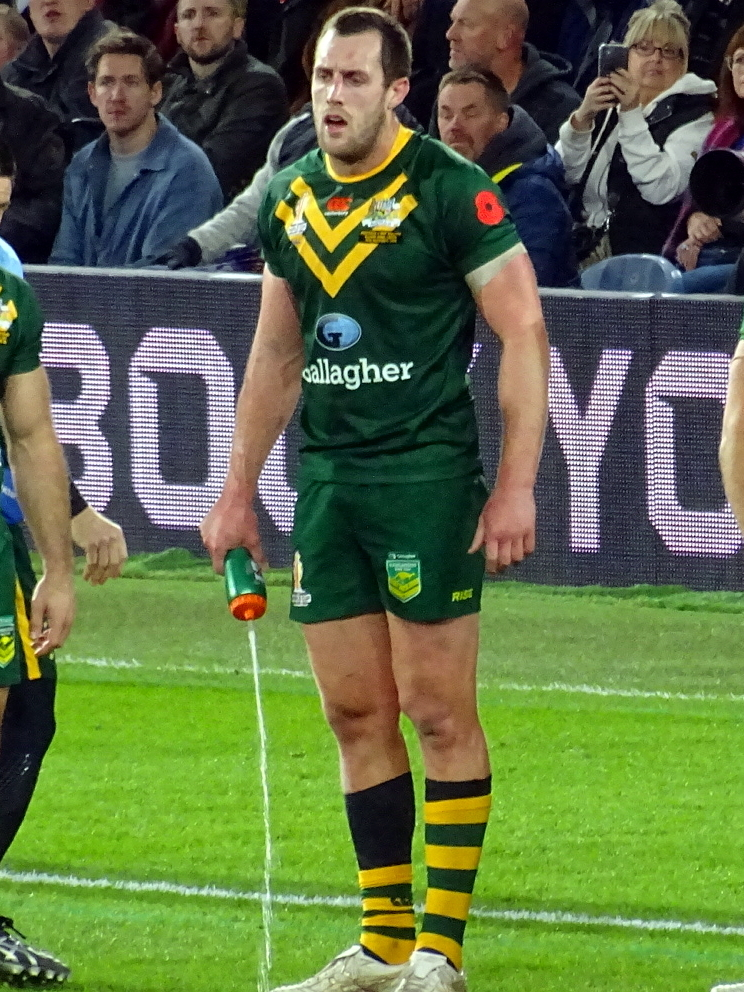
Yeo playing for Australia in 2022

=== 2022 ===
On 29 May, Yeo was selected by New South Wales to play in game one of the 2022 State of Origin series. Yeo played in all three games as New South Wales lost the series 2–1.

Yeo played 23 games for Penrith in the 2022 NRL season including the clubs 2022 NRL Grand Final victory over Parramatta.

In October he was named in the Australia squad for the 2021 Rugby League World Cup. Yeo played for Australia in their 2021 Rugby League World Cup final victory over Samoa.

=== 2023 ===
On 18 February, Yeo played in Penrith's 13–12 upset loss to St Helens RFC in the 2023 World Club Challenge. On 22 May, Yeo was selected by New South Wales for game one of the 2023 State of Origin series. Yeo played 24 games for Penrith in the 2023 NRL season including the clubs 26–24 victory over Brisbane in the 2023 NRL Grand Final as Penrith won their third straight premiership.

=== 2024 ===
On 24 February, Yeo played in Penrith's 2024 World Club Challenge final loss against Wigan. On 26 May, Yeo was selected by New South Wales ahead of the 2024 State of Origin series. Yeo played in all three games as New South Wales won the series 2–1. Yeo played 25 games for Penrith in the 2024 NRL season including the clubs 14-6 grand final victory over Melbourne.

On 11 December, Yeo was named the Golden Boot winner. He became the first Australian Test player since Cameron Smith (in 2017) and the first New South Welshman since Anthony Minichiello (in 2005) to win the award, while also becoming the next Penrith Panthers player after James Fisher Harris to win it.

=== 2025 ===
Yeo was named captain of New South Wales for the 2025 State of Origin series. New South Wales were favourites to win the series but lost 2–1. Yeo played 21 games for Penrith in the 2025 NRL season as the club finished 7th on the table. Yeo played in Penrith's narrow preliminary final loss against Brisbane. Yeo captained Australia in the 1st and 3rd Ashes Tests v England, missing the 2nd test due to concussion protocols, with Australia winning the series 3 - 0.

=== 2026 ===
In May, Yeo was named by New South Wales for game one in the 2026 State of Origin series. Yeo played all three games for New South Wales as they won the series 2-1. Yeo played 20 games as Penrith claimed the minor premiership. Yeo played in Penrith's upset preliminary final loss to Newcastle.

== Honours ==
Individual

- Dally M Lock of the Year: 2020, 2021, 2022, 2024
- Dally M Captain of the Year: 2022
- Merv Cartwright Medal: 2018, 2023, 2024
- John Farragher Award for Courage and Determination: 2017
- IRL Golden Boot: 2024

Penrith Panthers - #537

- 54th Penrith Panthers Captain
- NRL Premiership: 2021, 2022, 2023, 2024
- NSW State Cup: 2014
- NYC Premiership: 2013

New South Wales - #292 / #1016

- 22nd NSW Blues Captain
- State of Origin Series: 2021, 2024, 2026

Australia Kangaroos - #844

- 71st Australia Kangaroos Captain
- IRL World Cup: 2021, 2026
- Pacific Cup: 2024
- Ashes Series: 2025

== Statistics ==
Year	Team	Games	Tries	Pts
2014	Penrith Panthers	10	2	8
2015	Penrith Panthers	21	2	8
2016	Penrith Panthers	26	5	20
2017	Penrith Panthers	25	2	8
2018	Penrith Panthers	26	4	16
2019	Penrith Panthers	18	2	8
2020	Penrith Panthers	22	2	8
2021	Penrith Panthers	25	2	8
2022	Penrith Panthers	23	4	16
2023	Penrith Panthers	24	4	16
2024	Penrith Panthers	25	2	8
2025	Penrith Panthers	21	1	4
2026	Penrith Panthers	19	2	8
2027	Penrith Panthers			
	Totals	285	34	136
