= Justin Yeo =

Australian rugby league footballer

Personal information
- Born: 21 January 1976 (age 49) Dubbo, New South Wales, Australia

Playing information
- Position: Centre
Club
Years	Team	Pld	T	G	FG	P
1998	North Sydney	1	0	0	0	0
1999	Balmain Tigers	10	0	0	0	0
	Total	11	0	0	0	0
- Source: As of 31 May 2019
- Relatives: Isaah Yeo (son)

Justin Yeo is an Australian former professional rugby league footballer who played for North Sydney and Balmain in the National Rugby League competition.

Yeo is noted for his support of local community events including the Gulgong 7s.

== Background ==
Yeo was born in Dubbo, New South Wales, Australia. His son, Isaah Yeo, plays for the Penrith Panthers.

== Playing career ==
Yeo made his first grade debut for North Sydney in Round 12 in 1998 against Cronulla at Shark Park. In 1999, he joined Balmain and made his debut for the club in the Round 1 game which, coincidentally, was also against Cronulla. Balmain lost the match 44–0.

Yeo left Balmain when it merged with Western Suburbs and returned to captain coach Dubbo CYMS in Group 11 of the New South Wales Country Rugby League.
