= David Schrader (rugby league) =

Australian rugby league player (born 1977)

Personal information
- Full name: David John Schrader
- Born: 30 March 1977 (age 49) Forbes, NSW Australia

Playing information
- Position: Centre
Club
Years	Team	Pld	T	G	FG	P
1999	Canberra Raiders	7	2	0	0	8

David Schrader (born 30 March 1977) is an Australian former professional rugby league footballer who played as a centre for the Canberra Raiders in the NRL.

== Playing career ==
Schrader was a Forbes Magpies junior. He was graded by the Canberra Raiders in the 1998 season. Schrader made his first grade debut in his side's 26–6 victory over the Melbourne Storm at Bruce Stadium in round 14 of the 1999 season. He also scored 2 tries on debut. Schrader played another six more first grade games for Canberra, the last of which was his side's 42–14 victory over the Balmain Tigers at Bruce Stadium in the final round of the 1999 season. This match would also turn out to be Balmain's final ever first grade game. He was released by the Raiders at the end of the season and never played first grade rugby league again. He now runs a successful electrical company in forbes named DSW electrical.

After his departure from Canberra, Schrader went on to play for the Forbes Magpies in the Group 11 Rugby League competition, playing in 3 first-grade grand finals in 4 years with the club and in 2004 Schrader was the Captain/Coach of the Forbes reserve grade side while also backing up to play in firsts weekly, on Grand Final day he lost both the Reserves and Firsts Grand finals to Dubbo CYMS.
