= Rex Bassingthwaighte =

Australian rugby league footballer (born 2007)

Personal information
- Born: 9 February 2007 (age 19) Dubbo, New South Wales, Australia
- Height: 183 cm (6 ft 0 in)
- Weight: 85 kg (13 st 5 lb)

Playing information
- Position: Fullback
Club
Years	Team	Pld	T	G	FG	P
2026–	Sydney Roosters	3	3	0	0	12
- Source: RLP

Rex Bassingthwaighte (born 9 February 2007) is an Australian professional rugby league footballer in the National Rugby League (NRL).

Born in Dubbo, Bassingthwaighte played both codes of rugby growing up. He attended Shore School in Sydney and was a member of their 2024 AAGPS premiership-winning team, with his potential recognised with selection to both the under-16s and under-18s Wallabies squads. His junior rugby league was played with St Johns Dubbo.

Bassingthwaighte was player of the year for the Sydney Roosters in the 2024 Harold Matthews Cup before featuring in back to back S. G. Ball Cup premierships in 2025 and 2026. He made his first-grade debut in round 15 of the 2026 NRL season as a winger against the Dolphins at Suncorp.
