= Chevy Stewart =

Australian rugby league footballer

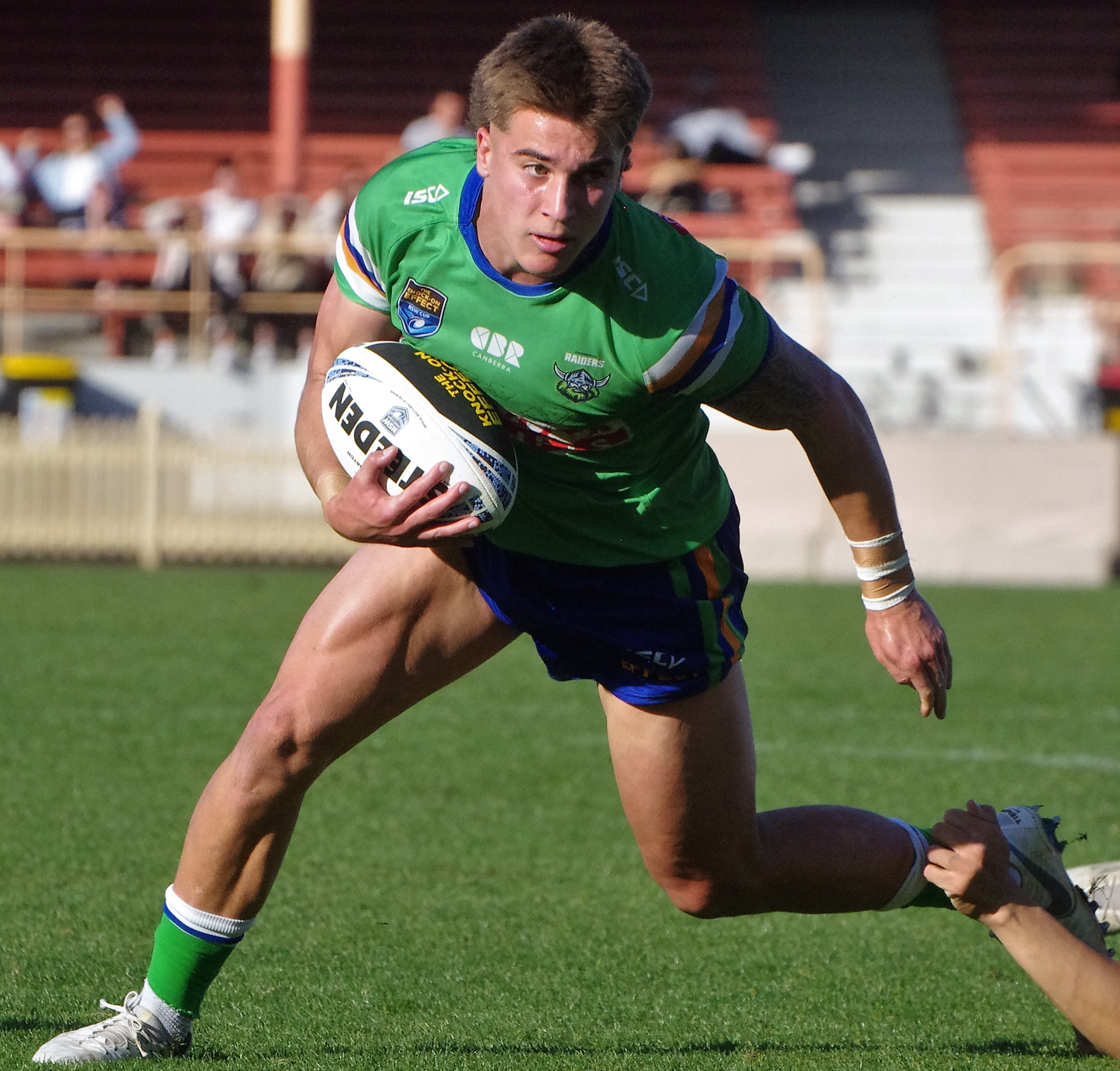

Personal information
- Full name: Chevy Stewart
- Born: 5 July 2005 (age 20) Sutherland, New South Wales, Australia
- Height: 183 cm (6 ft 0 in)
- Weight: 90 kg (14 st 2 lb)

Playing information
- Position: Fullback
Club
Years	Team	Pld	T	G	FG	P
2024–	Canberra Raiders	5	0	1	0	2

Chevy Stewart (born 5 July 2005) is an Australian professional rugby league footballer who plays as a fullback for the Canberra Raiders in the National Rugby League and NSW Cup.

== Background ==
Stewart was born in Sydney, New South Wales. He attended Endeavour Sports High School before being signed by the Cronulla-Sutherland Sharks on a development contract.

== Playing career ==
Stewart played his entire junior career with the Kurnell Stingrays who dominated the competition through the junior grades during his time there. In 2021, he was signed by Cronulla where he was named Junior Representative Player of the Year in 2022 after starring in their Harold Matthews Cup team. In 2022, Stewart was signed by the Canberra Raiders after a meeting with Canberra coach Ricky Stuart.

In 2023, Stewart played 18 games for Canberra's NSW Cup outfit, scoring nine tries and providing eight assists with his electric style earning plenty of plaudits. At the conclusion of the 2023 NRL season, Stewart re-signed with the club on a four-year deal which expires at the end of 2026 season with an option for 2027.

Stewart made his first grade debut for Canberra against the Gold Coast Titans in his side's 21−20 golden point extra-time victory at Canberra Stadium in round 6 of the 2024 NRL season. On 29 July 2025, it was announced that Stewart was told by the Canberra club that he could negotiate with other teams ahead of the 2026 NRL season.

== Controversy ==
On 30 September 2025, it was reported that Stewart was arrested by police and charged with malicious damage to property after allegedly pouring alcohol into a poker machine at Northies in Cronulla. NSW Police released a statement which read "“The 20-year-old man was arrested and issued a Court Attendance Notice for malicious damage. He was set to appear before Sutherland Local Court on Monday 6 November 2025". On 22 January 2026, Stewart was found guilty of damaging property and handed a 12-month conditional release order.
