= Jason Hoogerwerf =

Australian rugby league footballer

Personal information
- Full name: Jason Hoogerwerf
- Born: 10 December 1966 (age 59)

Playing information
- Position: Prop
Club
Years	Team	Pld	T	G	FG	P
1988–90	St. George Dragons	24	0	0	0	0
1991	Newcastle Knights	5	0	0	0	0
	Total	29	0	0	0	0
- Source: Whittacker/Hudson

Jason Hoogerwerf (born 10 December 1966) is an Australian former professional rugby league footballer who played in the 1980s and 1990s. He played for the St. George Dragons from 1988 to 1990 and the Newcastle Knights in 1991.
