= Reece Foley =

Australian rugby league footballer (born 2005)

Personal information
- Born: 6 January 2005 (age 21) Townsville, Queensland, Australia
- Height: 185 cm (6 ft 1 in)
- Weight: 84 kg (13 st 3 lb)

Playing information
- Position: Five-eighth
Club
Years	Team	Pld	T	G	FG	P
2026–	Sydney Roosters	2	0	0	0	0
- Source: RLP

Reece Foley (born 6 January 2005) is an Australian rugby league footballer for the Sydney Roosters in the National Rugby League (NRL).

A native of Townsville, Queensland, Foley was educated at Ignatius Park College and played his junior rugby league for local club the Western Lions. He came through the North Queensland Cowboys academy system and is a former member of the Queensland Emerging Origin (under-19) representative squad.

Foley broke into first-grade for the Sydney Roosters in 2026 during his third NSW Cup season. He debuted as one of the Roosters' State of Origin replacement players for their round 15 fixture against the Dolphins and was unable to finish the game after getting concussed attempting a tackle on Jamayne Isaako.
