= Aston Warwick =

Australian rugby league footballer (born 2003)

Personal information
- Born: 30 April 2003 (age 23) Dubbo, New South Wales, Australia
- Height: 188 cm (6 ft 2 in)
- Weight: 97 kg (15 st 4 lb)

Playing information
- Position: Second-row
Club
Years	Team	Pld	T	G	FG	P
2026–	Sydney Roosters	1	0	0	0	0
- Source: RLP

Aston Warwick (born 30 April 2003) is an Australian rugby league footballer for the Sydney Roosters in the National Rugby League (NRL).

== Early life ==
Born in Dubbo, Warwick is the son of former Macquarie Raiders stalwart Brett Warwick and himself played for the Raiders juniors, as well as the South Dubbo Raiders. He attended Dubbo College.

== Career ==
Warwick, a back-rower, was with the Penrith Panthers from 2021 to 2024. He had the distinction of featuring in both the Panthers' SG Ball Cup and Jersey Flegg premierships-winning teams in 2022.

Moving to the Sydney Roosters in 2025, Warwick made his first-grade debut in the final round of the 2026 NRL season, coming on off the bench against South Sydney.

== Personal life ==
Warwick is the brother-in-law of Canterbury Bulldogs five-eighth Matt Burton.
