= Pat Gibson (rugby league) =

Australian rugby league footballer

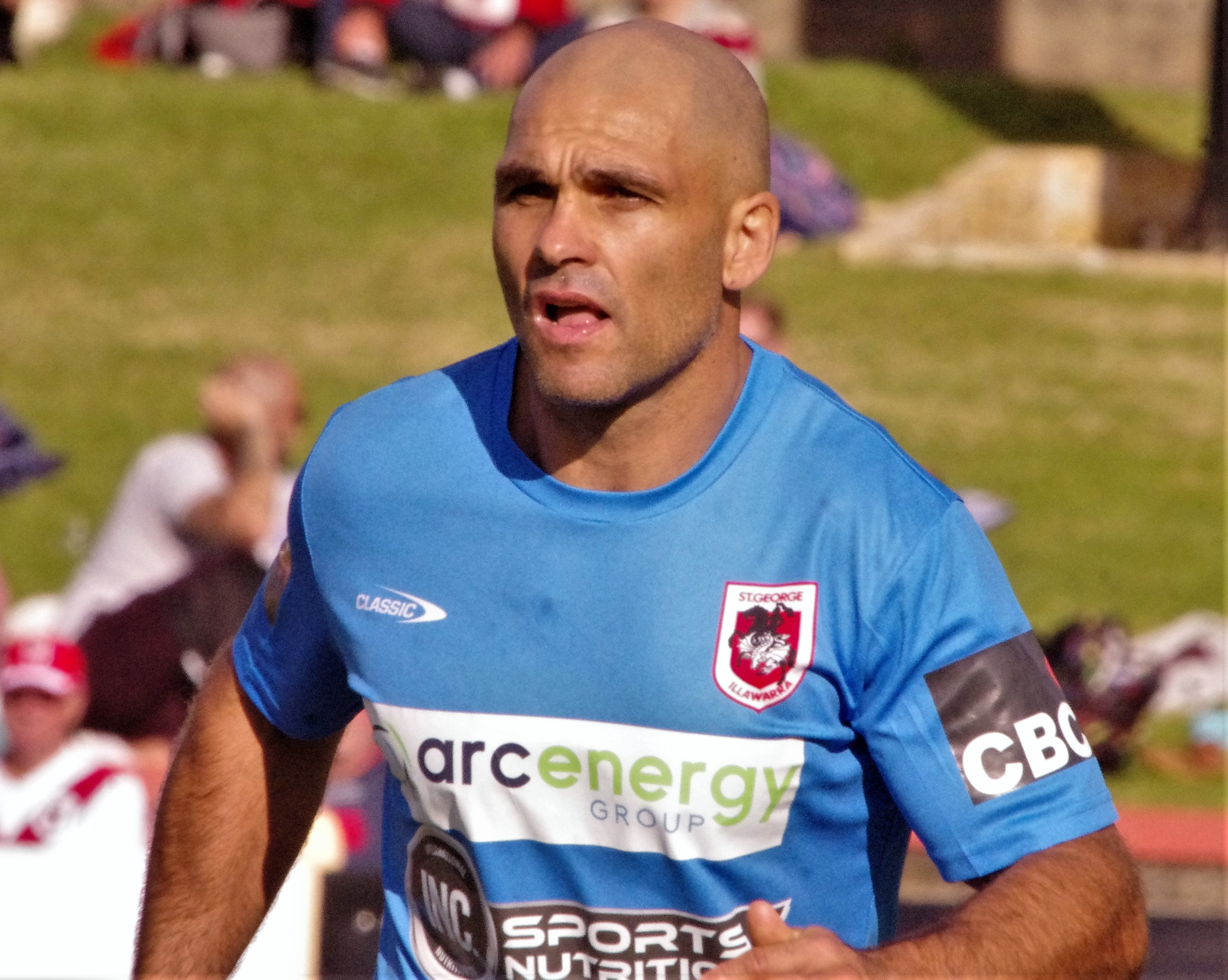

Personal information
- Full name: Patrick Gibson
- Born: 19 June 1981 (age 45) Manildra, New South Wales, Australia

Playing information
- Position: Hooker
Club
Years	Team	Pld	T	G	FG	P
2002–04	Cronulla Sharks	30	6	0	0	24

Pat Gibson (born 19 June 1981) is an Australian former professional rugby league footballer who played as a hooker for the Cronulla Sharks in the NRL.

== Playing career ==
Gibson made his debut game in Round 7 of the 2002 NRL Season. Gibson went on to play 30 matches between 2002 and 2004 for Cronulla.
