= Sydney Roosters =

Rugby league club in Sydney, New South Wales, Australia

Club information
- Full name: Eastern Suburbs District; Rugby League Football Club
- Nickname(s): Roosters, Easts, Tricolours, Chooks, Red White and Bluesters, Sydney City, Eastern Suburbs
- Short name: SYD
- Colours: Navy; White; Red
- Founded: 24 January 1908; 118 years ago as Eastern Suburbs District Rugby League Football Club
- Website: roosters.com.au

Current details
- Ground: Sydney Football Stadium (42,500)
- CEO: Joe Kelly
- Chairman: Nick Politis
- Coach: Trent Robinson (NRL); John Strange (NRLW)
- Captain: James Tedesco (NRL); Isabelle Kelly (NRLW)
- Competition: National Rugby League and NRL Women's Premiership
- 2026 season: 4th (Premiers)
- Current season

Uniforms
| Home colours | Away colours |

Records
- Premierships: 16 (1911, 1912, 1913, 1923, 1935, 1936, 1937, 1940, 1945, 1974, 1975, 2002, 2013, 2018, 2019, 2026)
- Runners-up: 15 (1908, 1919, 1921, 1928, 1931, 1934, 1938, 1941, 1960, 1972, 1980, 2000, 2003, 2004, 2010)
- Minor premierships: 20 (1912, 1913, 1923, 1931, 1934, 1935, 1936, 1937, 1940, 1941, 1945, 1974, 1975, 1980, 1981, 2004, 2013, 2014, 2015, 2018)
- NRL Nines: 1 (2017)
- World Club Challenge: 5 (1976, 2003, 2014, 2019, 2020)
- World Sevens: 1 (1993)
- NSW Cup: 9 (1908, 1909, 1910, 1911, 1935, 1937, 1949, 1986, 2004)
- NRLW: 3 (2022, 2024,2026)
- Wooden spoons: 5 (1949, 1963, 1965, 1966, 2009)
- Most capped: 310 – Jared Waerea-Hargreaves
- Highest try scorer: 198 – Daniel Tupou
- Highest points scorer: 1,454 – Craig Fitzgibbon

Eastern Suburbs District Rugby League Football Club, trading as the Sydney Roosters (Note: The team competes and trades the Sydney Roosters, having adopted that name in 2000 after being known since 1995 as the Sydney City Roosters, but the team's official name remains Eastern Suburbs District Rugby League Football Club) are an Australian professional rugby league football club based in Sydney's Eastern Suburbs. The club competes in the National Rugby League (NRL) competition. The club holds the record for having won more matches than any other in the league, the most minor premierships and the most World Club Challenge trophies. Currently coached by Trent Robinson and captained by James Tedesco, the Roosters play home games at the Sydney Football Stadium.

The club was founded in 1908 in Paddington, Sydney, as Eastern Suburbs; in 1995, the club's name was changed to the Sydney City Roosters and, in 2000, to the Sydney Roosters. The team's Leagues Club is based in Bondi Junction and its home ground, administration and training facilities are located at nearby Moore Park. The Roosters have long-standing and fierce rivalries with other Sydney-based clubs, especially the South Sydney Rabbitohs, a fellow foundation club based in neighbouring Redfern.

First founded as the Eastern Suburbs District Rugby League Football Club (ESDRLFC), it is the only club to have played in every season at the elite level. The Roosters have won sixteen New South Wales Rugby League (NSWRL) and National Rugby League titles, and several other competitions. They are the current reigning premiers after defeating the Newcastle Knights 19-18 in the 2026 NRL Grand Final.

== History ==
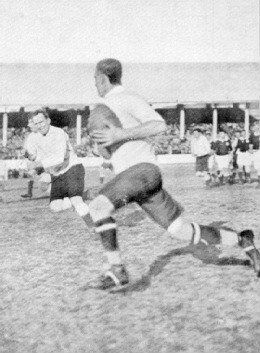
Easts pioneers Dan Frawley (right) and Dally Messenger (left) in action for New South Wales in 1912

== 20th century ==
The Eastern Suburbs District Rugby League Football Club (ESDRLFC) was formed on 24 January 1908 at a meeting at the Paddington Town Hall in Sydney after it was decided that the district should enter a team in the newly formed New South Wales Rugby Football League. The ESDRLFC was formed, under its articles of association with the NSWRFL, to represent the geographic areas in Sydney covering the Waverley, Randwick, Woollahra, Paddington and Vaucluse local government municipalities, as well as the eastern parts of the Sydney CBD.

Unofficially nicknamed the "Tricolours" due to the red, white and blue playing strip, Eastern Suburbs won its first match, defeating Newtown 32–16 at Wentworth Oval on 20 April 1908. In 1911-13 it became the first club to win three consecutive premierships; the line-ups during this period included the likes of Dally Messenger, Harry "Jersey" Flegg and Sandy Pearce, all regarded as all-time rugby league greats. In 1911 John "Dinny" Campbell playing for Eastern Suburbs kicked the last ever soccer-style field goal in premiership history. After 1913 the club rapidly declined and failed to win the premiership for the next nine seasons.

Eastern Suburbs missed the finals once from 1926 to 1942, and in that time won four titles and the minor premiership on seven occasions. During this period, Dave Brown set several point-scoring records that still stand. In 1935, the team lost just one game, and recorded the highest winning margin in their history, an 87–7 (equivalent to 106–8 using the modern scoring system) victory over Canterbury. In 1936, Eastern Suburbs became one of five teams in premiership history to remain undefeated for an entire season, a feat they repeated the following year. It is the only club to remain unbeaten for two consecutive seasons.

Despite claiming the premiership in 1945, Eastern Suburbs failed to make the finals for the following seven seasons. A runners-up finish in 1960 was the closest the club came to claiming the premiership during this era. Eastern Suburbs were soundly defeated 31–6 in the grand final that year, by the famous record-beating St George outfit. In 1966, the club fell to new depths and was winless for the first time in its history. It was also the last occasion in which the Roosters won the wooden spoon until claiming it again in the 2009 season. It ended a poor run for Eastern Suburbs; from 1963 to 1966, they won 8 of 72 matches, finishing second to last in 1964 and last in the other three years. The club underwent a renaissance in 1967 after appointing Jack Gibson as coach (1967–68), and introducing a new emblem on the playing jerseys, the rooster.

From 1972 to 1982, the Roosters won four minor premierships and played in four grand finals, winning two consecutively. Gibson, now dubbed as "Super Coach", returned to lead the team from 1974 to 1976. In 1974 and 1975, the team won 39 of 44 matches, both minor premierships and both grand finals and set a premiership record of 19 consecutive wins. The 38–0 grand final victory in 1975 against St George was the largest margin in a first grade grand final, and the record stood for 33 years until superseded by Manly's 40–0 win over the Melbourne Storm in 2008. Although the 1975 grand final was played during an era of a now-obsolete scoring system - with 3 points awarded for a try - the scoreline using 4 points for tries would mean that the record winning margin for a grand final would still hold with an adjusted score of 46–0. With line-ups including Mark Harris, Elwyn Walters, John Brass, Bill Mullins, Russell Fairfax, Johnny Mayes, John Peard, Ron Coote, Ian Schubert and captain Arthur Beetson, the Centenary of Rugby League panel considered the Roosters of 1974 and 1975 to be among the greatest club teams of all time.

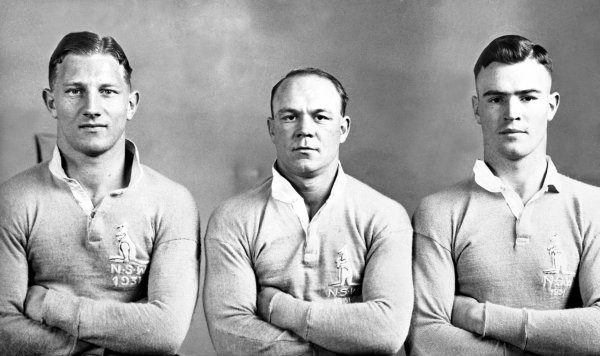
Three representative Roosters in 1931: Brown, Norman and Stehr.

Between 1984 and 1995, the Roosters reached the semi-finals once, and became known to critics as the "transit lounge", due to the high frequency of player purchases and releases. The club came close to reaching the premiership in 1987 under coach and favourite son Arthur Beetson, being defeated by eventual premiers Manly in a "bruising" major semi-final, 10–6.

As the Super League war built up in the mid-1990s, the Roosters recruited high-profile coach Phil Gould and star five-eighth Brad Fittler, both from the Penrith Panthers. This helped to quickly send the Roosters back to the upper end of the ladder. Fittler's presence proved invaluable; during his reign, the Roosters competed in four grand finals in five years.

== 21st century ==
In 2002, the club captured its 12th premiership – the first in 27 years – defeating Minor Premiers the New Zealand Warriors 30–8 in the 2002 NRL grand final.

In the 2003 NRL grand final against the Penrith Panthers, the Roosters lost 18–6 in what was their heaviest defeat for the year. A decisive moment occurred midway through the second half: with the scores tied at 6-all, Roosters winger Todd Byrne made a clear break down the sideline and looked set to score a try before being chased down and tackled into touch by Penrith lock forward, Scott Sattler. From then on, the momentum of the game was with Penrith. The Roosters' made the 2004 NRL Grand Final, in which they ceded a 13–6 half-time lead to be defeated by the Bulldogs 16–13. The match was captain Fittler's last for the team.

Chart of yearly table positions for Sydney Roosters in First Grade Rugby League

In 2007, the Roosters became the first club to play 100 seasons of first grade rugby league; having been the only outfit to play in each season since the competition's inception in 1908. They appointed Chris Anderson as coach in 2007 and 2008 following two relatively unsuccessful years under Ricky Stuart. On 9 July 2007, Anderson resigned after a 56–0 loss to the Manly-Warringah Sea Eagles. Assistant Coach Fittler acted as the caretaker for the remainder of the 2007 season, before being appointed in August to the top job for two years. With eight rounds remaining in a disappointing 2009 season in which the Roosters finished with the wooden spoon for the first time in 43 years, Fittler was informed he would not be the coach in 2010, his position to be taken by veteran coach Brian Smith. The Roosters wound up winning only five games for the entire season; twice against Cronulla and once against each of Canberra in Canberra, eventual grand finalists Parramatta and Newcastle in Newcastle.

A year after finishing last, under the coaching of Brian Smith they reached the 2010 NRL Grand Final where the St. George Illawarra Dragons defeated them 32–8. The Roosters led 8–6 at half time but were overrun in the second half.

What followed was another relatively disappointing season at Bondi Junction, with the Roosters finishing 11th in a 2011 season plagued by off-field issues involving 2010 Dally M Medallist Todd Carney (who was later sacked by the Roosters at season's end). However, a four-game winning streak to end the season brought hope for the 2012 season. Other high-profile players including Nate Myles, Mark Riddell, Jason Ryles, Kane Linnett, and Phil Graham all left the club at season's end.

The Roosters endured a disappointing 2012 season, finishing 13th. Brian Smith resigned from the coaching role shortly after the Roosters' season concluded with a loss to the Minor Premiers Canterbury, and also at season's end captain Braith Anasta left to join the Wests Tigers in 2013.

The 2013 season saw new staff, a new coach, Trent Robinson, and several new players, including big signings Michael Jennings, James Maloney, Luke O'Donnell and Sonny Bill Williams, arrive at the club. This culminated in the Roosters finishing the 2013 season with a 24–12 win over the South Sydney Rabbitohs, securing the Minor Premiership for the 2013 season and were the NRL's best attacking and defensive team. The Roosters defeated the Manly-Warringah Sea Eagles 4–0, in week one of the finals, earning a week's rest. The Roosters defeated the Newcastle Knights 40–14 in week three of the NRL finals, progressing to the 2013 NRL grand final, facing the Manly-Warringah Sea Eagles, winning 26–18. It was a great comeback by the Roosters, down by 10 points in the second half they went on to score three consecutive tries to seal the win and their 13th premiership. They then went on to win the 2014 World Club Challenge against Wigan 36–14 to claim the treble of club titles. No team in premiership history had come from a lower ladder position to win the following season's title.

In the 2014 season, the club finished first on the table winning the Minor Premiership. In the Preliminary Final against arch rivals Souths, Sydney lost the match 32–22 in what was retiring legend Anthony Minichiello's final game. In the 2015 season, Sydney finished first on the table and claimed their third consecutive Minor Premiership. The Roosters again made the Preliminary Final with Brisbane this time being the opponents. The Roosters ended up losing the match 31–12 in front of a sold-out crowd at Suncorp Stadium.

In the 2016 season, the Roosters finished 15th on the table after enduring a horror season where star player Mitchell Pearce was suspended for 8 matches, fined $A125,000 and stripped of the captaincy following a pre season incident where Pearce was intoxicated, simulated a sex act with a dog which was filmed on another party goer's mobile phone. The club also struggled due to injuries to star players such as Boyd Cordner and Jared Waerea-Hargreaves.

The Roosters finished 2nd at the end of the 2017 season and defeated Brisbane in week one of the finals earning the week off. Sydney's opponents in the Preliminary Final were North Queensland who had finished in 8th position on the table and produced upset victories over Cronulla and Parramatta. In a game that the Roosters were expected to win, the Cowboys surprised everyone winning the match 29–16.

In 2018, the Sydney Roosters finished in first place during the regular season, claiming their 20th Minor Premiership. They beat Cronulla-Sutherland 21–12 in week one of the finals, earning the week off.

In March 2018, the NRL announced that the club had been successful in their bid for a team in the inaugural NRL Women's competition set to start in September of that year. This inclusion made Eastern Suburbs the only double foundation club in the league. The team would finish the season in second place, losing in the Grand Final to the Brisbane Broncos.

The club then broke its preliminary final hoodoo by beating rivals South Sydney 12–4 in what was the last sports match ever played at the Sydney Football Stadium. They managed to keep Souths tryless, and the crowd was the largest ever recorded in a sporting match at the Sydney Football Stadium with 44,380 people in attendance. The Roosters played Melbourne in the 2018 NRL Grand Final, and won 21–6 to claim their 14th premiership.

The Roosters started the 2019 NRL season with a round 1 loss against rivals Souths at the Sydney Cricket Ground. The club then went on an eight-game winning run and defeated Melbourne 21–20 in the grand final rematch which was played at AAMI Park. The Roosters also scored impressive victories over Brisbane 36–4 and Wests 42–12 which were both played at the Sydney Cricket Ground.

Midway through the 2019 NRL season, Sydney suffered a drop in form during the 2019 State of Origin series period before recovering by winning 7 of their last 8 matches of the season to finish 2nd behind minor premiers Melbourne. The Roosters defeated rivals South Sydney and Melbourne to reach the 2019 NRL Grand Final. In the grand final, Sydney won their second consecutive premiership after a hard-fought victory against Canberra at ANZ Stadium. It was the first time that a team had won consecutive premierships in a unified competition since Brisbane achieved the feat in the 1992 and 1993 seasons.

The club began the 2020 NRL season once again as one of the teams to beat for the premiership but suffered back to back losses to start the year before the season was interrupted due to the COVID-19 Pandemic. After the return to play, the club won five matches in a row and only lost three matches between round 8 and round 20.

The Roosters finished the season in 4th place and qualified for the finals. In week one of the finals, they were defeated by minor premiers Penrith which forced them into an elimination final match against Canberra. The Roosters quest for a third straight premiership was ended as they lost against Canberra 22–18 at the Sydney Cricket Ground.

The club began the 2021 NRL season as one of the teams tipped to challenge for the premiership. In the opening two rounds of the year, the club defeated both Manly and the Wests Tigers by 40 points. Throughout the season however, the club suffered one of the biggest injury tolls in recent history losing Jake Friend, Boyd Cordner and Brett Morris to retirement and season ending injuries to Luke Keary, Lindsay Collins, Joseph Manu and Billy Smith. The Roosters were forced to blood nine debutants, including the likes of Sam Walker, Ben Marschke, Egan Butcher and Fletcher Baker and call upon players from the club's feeder side the North Sydney Bears. The club also suffered injuries and suspensions to other key players such as Victor Radley.

The Roosters ended the 2021 NRL season in fifth place and qualified for the finals. In week one of the finals, the club defeated the Gold Coast 25–24. The following week, the Roosters season ended after losing 42–6 against Manly. In the 2022 NRL season, the club finished sixth on the table. The Sydney Roosters won eight straight matches late in the season, but were knocked out in the first week of the finals. The Sydney Roosters entered the 2023 NRL season as one of the favourites to take out the competition but by round 20, the club were sat 14th on the table. The tri-colours then went on to win their remaining five matches of the season against also-rans Manly, the Dolphins, Parramatta, Wests Tigers and lastly arch-rivals South Sydney to finish 7th on the table. In week one of the finals, the club would defeat an out of sorts Cronulla side to reach the second week with their opponent being Melbourne. Melbourne were heavy favourites going into the game but with only minutes remaining the Sydney Roosters were in front 13–12 before Melbourne scored a try through William Warbrick to win the match 18–13. The match wasn't without controversy due to Melbourne scoring a try in the first half which came directly after Harry Grant had knocked the ball on from a cross-field kick, which was not called by referee Ashley Klein. In the 2024 NRL season, the club would finish third on the table and qualify for the finals. The club eventually reached the preliminary final but having lost halfback Sam Walker to a season ending ACL injury in the second last round of the season, they were bundled out in the penultimate week, beaten by Melbourne 48-18.

In the 2025 NRL season, the club finished 8th place on the table despite many pundits before the year started who predicted the club to miss the finals due to a high squad turnover in the off-season including the losses of Joseph Suaalii, Joseph Manu, Luke Keary and Jared Waerea-Hargraves - the latter of whom departed as the club's record games holder. The club were eliminated in the opening week of the finals by Cronulla. However, the 2025 season was remembered for the rise of Mark Nawaqanitawase who scored 24 tries during the season and would go on to play a key role in the following season's premiership run.

Prior to the 2026 season, the Sydney Roosters recruited Manly halfback Daly Cherry-Evans on a one-year deal. After losing two of the first three games, the club won 15 of the next 18 matches to find themselves 1st on the ladder at the conclusion of Round 24. After losing the next three games, the club fell to 4th place on the ladder. Despite losing to Penrith in Week 1 of the finals, the club won their next three finals, culminating in the grand final which the club won 19-18 over Newcastle, to secure the club's 16th premiership. Captain James Tedesco won the Clive Churchill Medal.

== Club Identity ==
| Year | Kit Manufacturer | Major Sponsor | Back Top Sponsor | Sleeve Sponsor | Back Bottom Sponsor | Front Shorts Sponsor | Back Shorts Sponsor | Chest Sponsor |
|---|---|---|---|---|---|---|---|---|
| 1908-75 | | | | | | | | |
| 1976-78 | | City Ford | | | | | | |
| 1979-92 | Classic | City Ford | | | | | | |
| 1993-97 | Classic | Samsung | | City Ford | | | | |
| 1998-2000 | Classic | Siemens Mobile | | City Ford | | | | |
| 2001 | Kappa | Siemens Mobile | | City Ford | | | | |
| 2002 | ISC | Western Union | | City Ford | | | | |
| 2003 | ISC | Western Union | | Keno | | | | |
| 2004 | ISC | Samsung | | Keno | | | | |
| 2005 | ISC | Samsung | | Car Buyers Guide | | | | |
| 2006-08 | ISC | Samsung | | Mortgage House | | | | |
| 2008-09 | ISC | Samsung | | Geon Group | | | | |
| 2010-11 | ISC | Steggles | | oo.com.au | | | | |
| 2012-14 | ISC | Steggles | | ISUZU Ute | | | | |
| 2015-16 | ISC | Steggles | | ISUZU Ute | | | | Peugeot |
| 2017 | ISC | Steggles | | QBE | | | | |
| 2018 | ISC | Steggles | | QBE | | | | Magic Glass |
| 2019 | ISC | Steggles | Unibet | | | Budget | | Magic Glass |
| 2020 | ISC | Steggles | Unibet | IKON | | Budget | | Magic Glass |
| 2021 | Castore | Steggles | Unibet | IKON | Grand Platinum | Budget | | Magic Glass |
| 2022-24 | Castore | Steggles | Unibet | IKON | Grand Platinum | Budget | | City Index |
| 2025 | Castore | BYD | Unibet | IKON | Reosteel | Budget | | Adapt Ovate |
| 2026 | Adidas | BYD | Unibet | Adept | Reosteel | Budget | | Adapt Ovate |
| 2027 | Adidas | BYD | | | | | | |

== Emblem and colours ==
The club's red, white and blue colours and initial striped jersey design were adopted at its founding meeting at Paddington Town Hall in 1908 by replicating those of the district's Easts rugby union club. The latter club had its formation in 1900 taken on the colours of the 1899 defunct Paddington FC, copying the same tri-colours hooped jersey worn by the 1899 British Lions on their tour of Australia. The red, white and blue tricolours jersey was first used in Australia in 1872 by Sydney's Wallaroo FC who were also based at Moore Park (home of the Sydney Roosters).

Eastern Suburbs did not traditionally sport a crest badge on their jerseys in the first half of the 20th century. Other clubs occasionally sported simple designs on their strip; however, this was not seen consistently on all jerseys until the 1950s and 1960s. In 1967, the club introduced its first logo, displaying the mantra "Easts to Win", following a winless season. The crest also incorporated a rooster or cockerel in the design; one source suggested that this choice of mascot followed after the Roosters' jersey design was inspired by the French national team's jersey. Given that the French team's mascot was affectionately known to supporters as le coq, "the rooster", connections have been made as to the choosing of a rooster for Eastern Suburbs' mascot.

In 1978, the mantra was replaced with the team's name, "Eastern Suburbs". This name was kept until 1994, when the club changed its team name to the "Sydney City Roosters" for the start of the 1995 season to appeal to the club's widening fan base. In 2000, the club shortened its name to the "Sydney Roosters".

Although marketing names have changed, the Roosters are still registered with the National Rugby League competition as the Eastern Suburbs District Rugby League Football Club, the entity holding the NRL licence.

Sydney Roosters - Logos

1967

1967- 1977

1978-1994

1995-1999

2000-Present

Red, white and blue have been the colours of every jersey design in the club's history; however, the jersey design has undergone several alterations. During World War II, the design of the jersey was modified because the dye used to colour jerseys was needed for the war effort. This saw Eastern Suburbs playing in different colours and an altered design. Instead of using the traditional hoops, the side used a sky-blue based jersey and a red and white V-strip around the collar. This is the only noted time in the club's history where the traditional deep blue, red and white combination was absent from the jersey. After the war, the V-strip design reverted to the original blue that had been present in the original jerseys, and the single red and white stripes around the shirt's chest were incorporated with a single white stripe surrounded by a red stripe on either side. This jersey appeared in the 1950s and remains the team's base design.

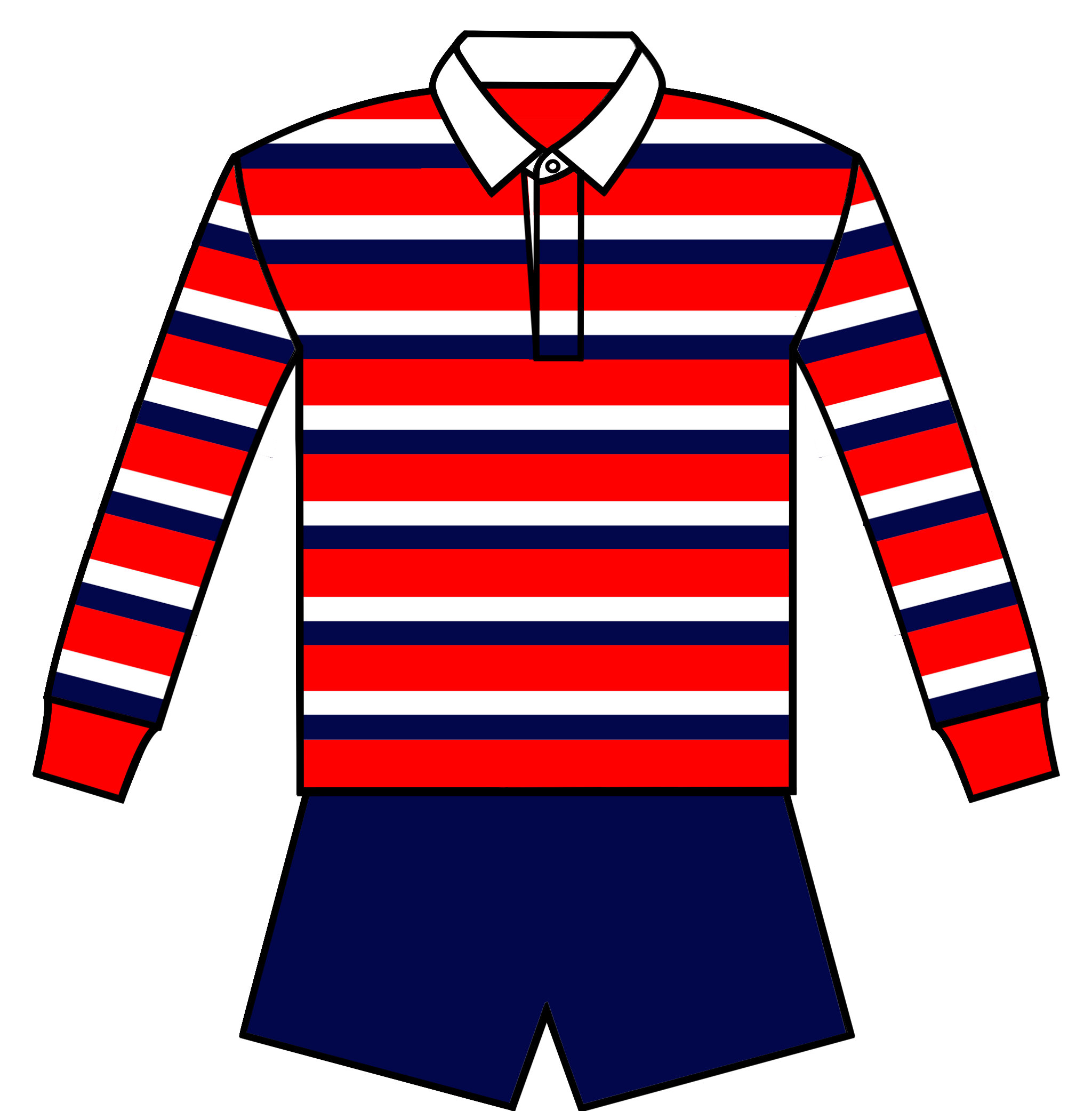
1908–1913

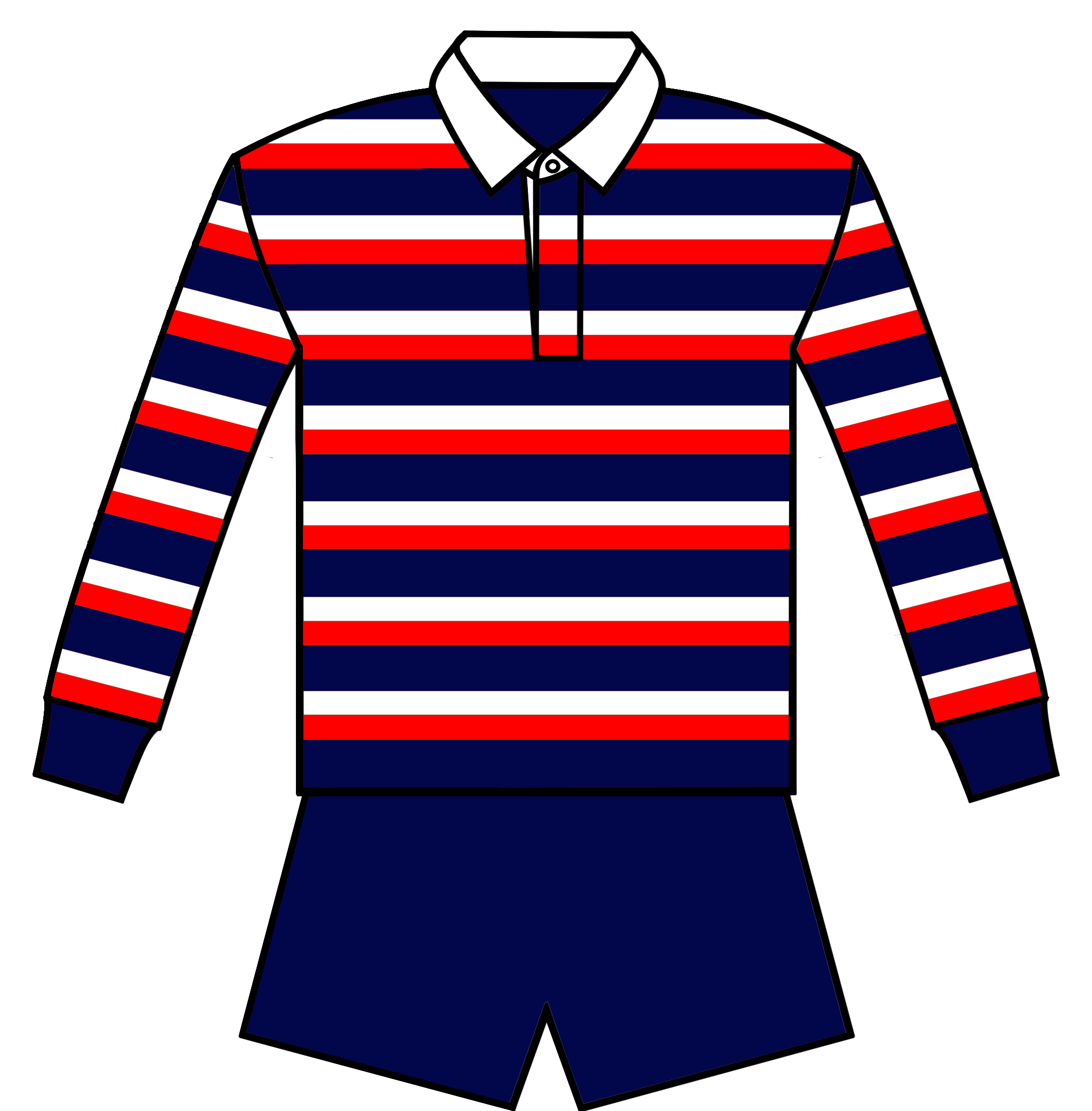
1914–1943, 1947–1953

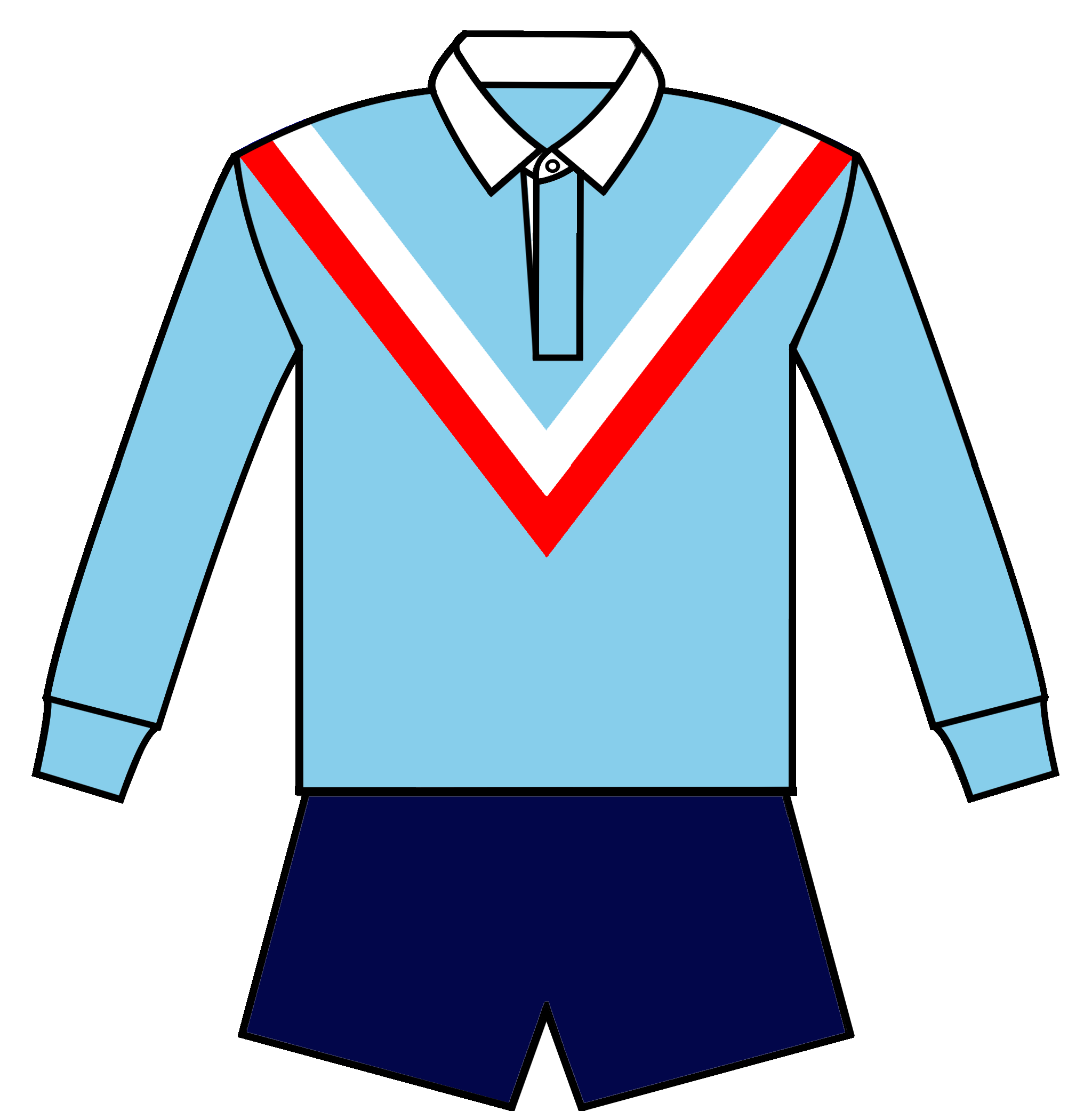
1944–1946

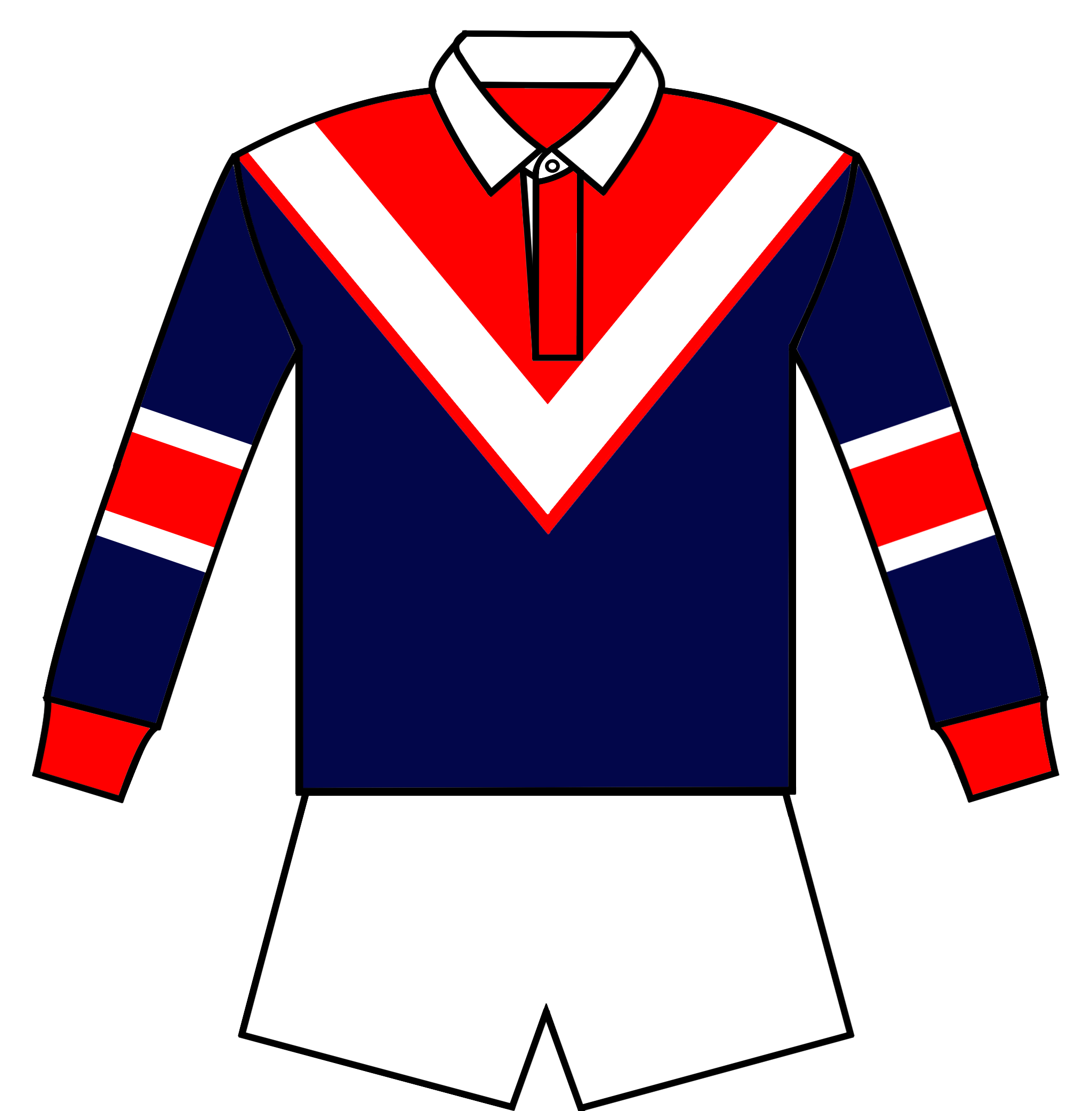
1954–1974

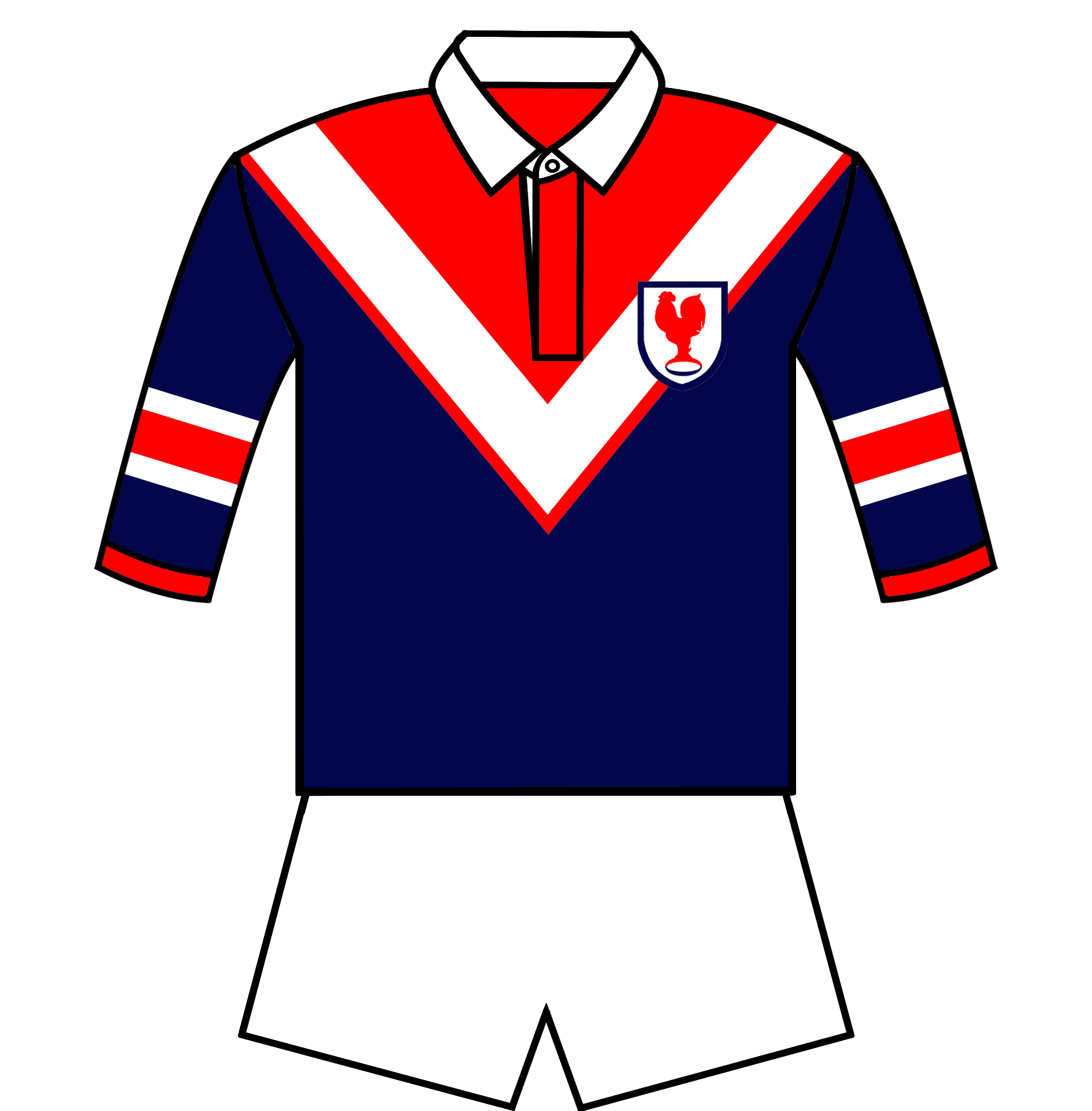
1975–1991

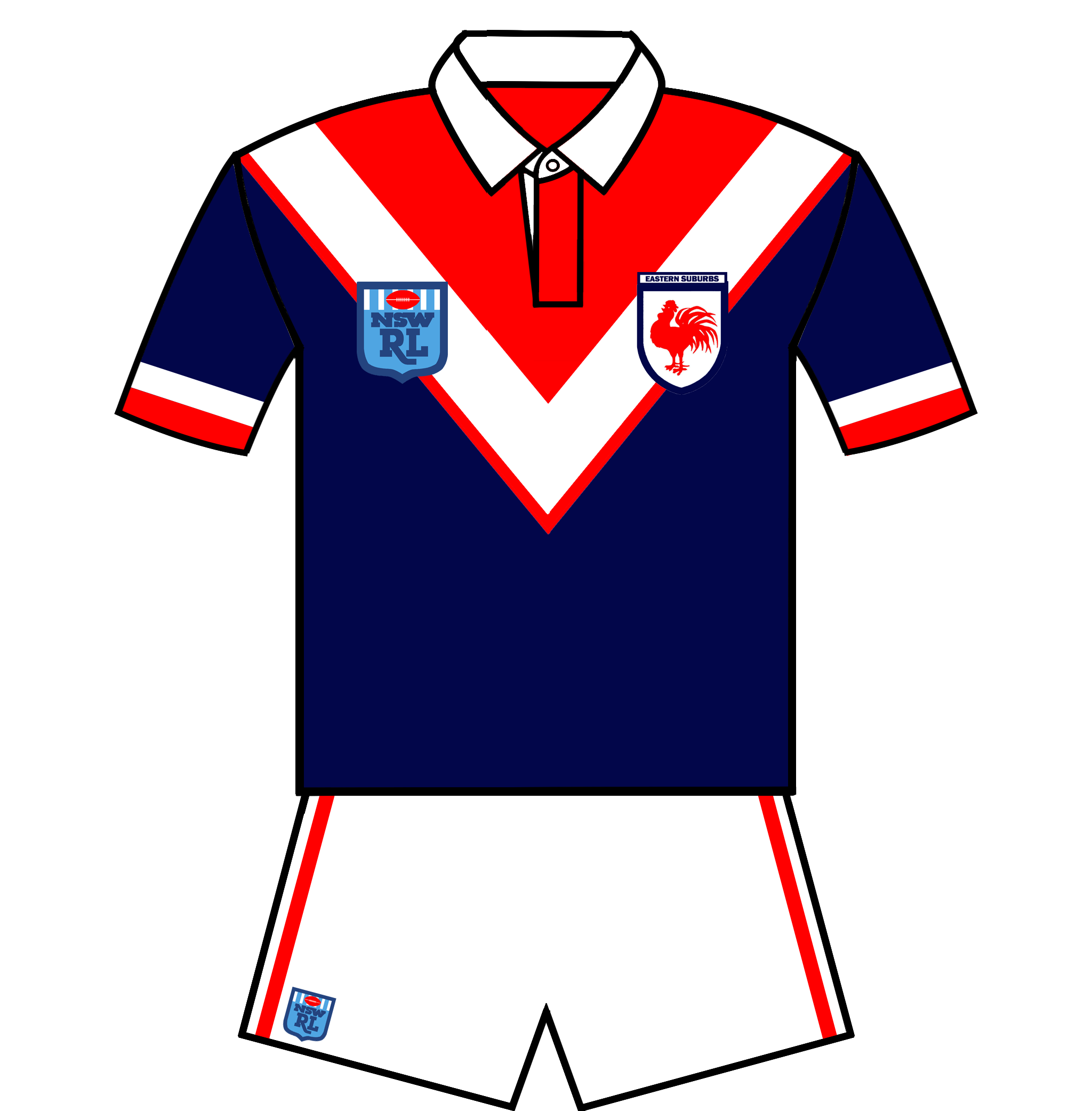
1992–2007

== Rivals ==
Main: South Sydney Rabbitohs.

The Roosters and the Rabbitohs are the only two foundation clubs left from the competition's first season in 1908 and have contested 237 games with South Sydney winning 122, the Roosters winning 110 and 5 games having been drawn. It is widely regarded as the fiercest grudge match not only in the NRL but in Australian sport. The neighbouring clubs are separated only by Sydney's Anzac Parade and reflect a socio-economic and geographic divide - South Sydney's working-class heartland in the Redfern/South Sydney district versus the Roosters more affluent base in Sydney's Eastern Suburbs. Between them, the clubs have won 37 first-grade premierships, making them the most successful clubs. The rivalry has intensified in the last 15 years with 4 finals encounters in 2014, 2018, 2019 and 2022 - after the last finals encounter had come in 1938; and several high-profile player switches including Luke Keary, Angus Crichton and Latrell Mitchell. Since 2007, the clubs have played for the Ron Coote Cup.

Major: St. George Illawarra Dragons (Anzac Day rivals), Canterbury-Bankstown Bulldogs, Melbourne Storm, Brisbane Broncos.

Minor: Penrith Panthers, Manly Warringah Sea Eagles, Parramatta Eels, Cronulla-Sutherland Sharks, Dolphins, Wests Tigers.

== Head-to-head records ==
| Opponent | Played | Won | Drawn | Lost | Win % |
|---|---|---|---|---|---|
| Tigers | 41 | 30 | 0 | 11 | 73.17 |
| Cowboys | 48 | 33 | 0 | 15 | 68.75 |
| Titans | 27 | 18 | 0 | 9 | 66.67 |
| Knights | 66 | 43 | 2 | 22 | 65.15 |
| Dolphins | 8 | 5 | 0 | 3 | 62.50 |
| Sharks | 113 | 70 | 2 | 41 | 61.95 |
| Dragons | 54 | 31 | 1 | 22 | 57.41 |
| Panthers | 111 | 62 | 1 | 48 | 55.86 |
| Raiders | 75 | 41 | 0 | 34 | 54.67 |
| Eels | 157 | 84 | 5 | 68 | 53.50 |
| Bulldogs | 192 | 99 | 5 | 88 | 51.56 |
| Warriors | 49 | 24 | 1 | 24 | 48.98 |
| Broncos | 63 | 30 | 0 | 33 | 47.62 |
| Rabbitohs | 237 | 110 | 5 | 122 | 46.41 |
| Storm | 55 | 21 | 0 | 34 | 38.18 |
| Sea Eagles | 154 | 58 | 2 | 94 | 37.66 |

== Stadium ==
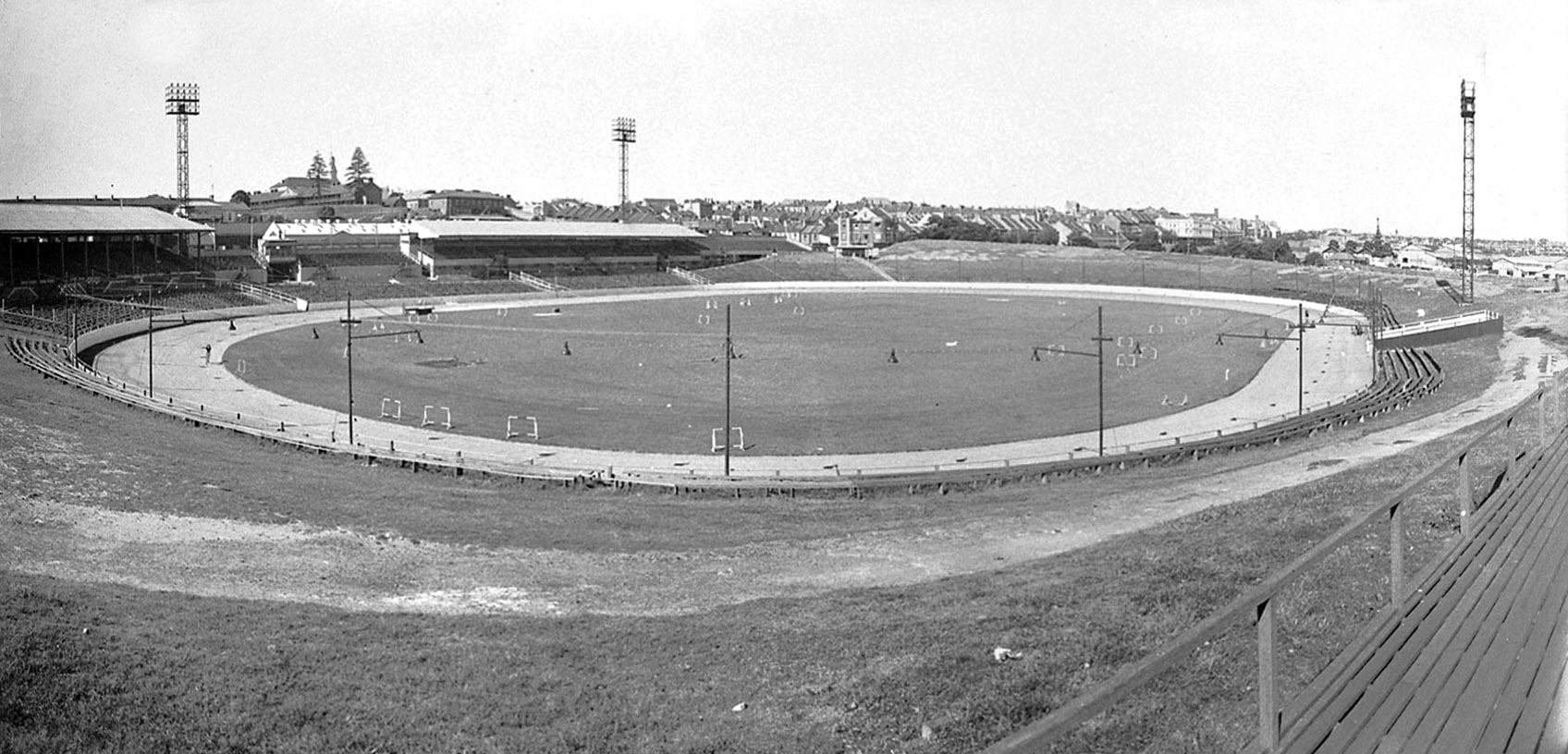
General view of the former Sydney Sports Ground, Moore Park, as it appeared in 1937.

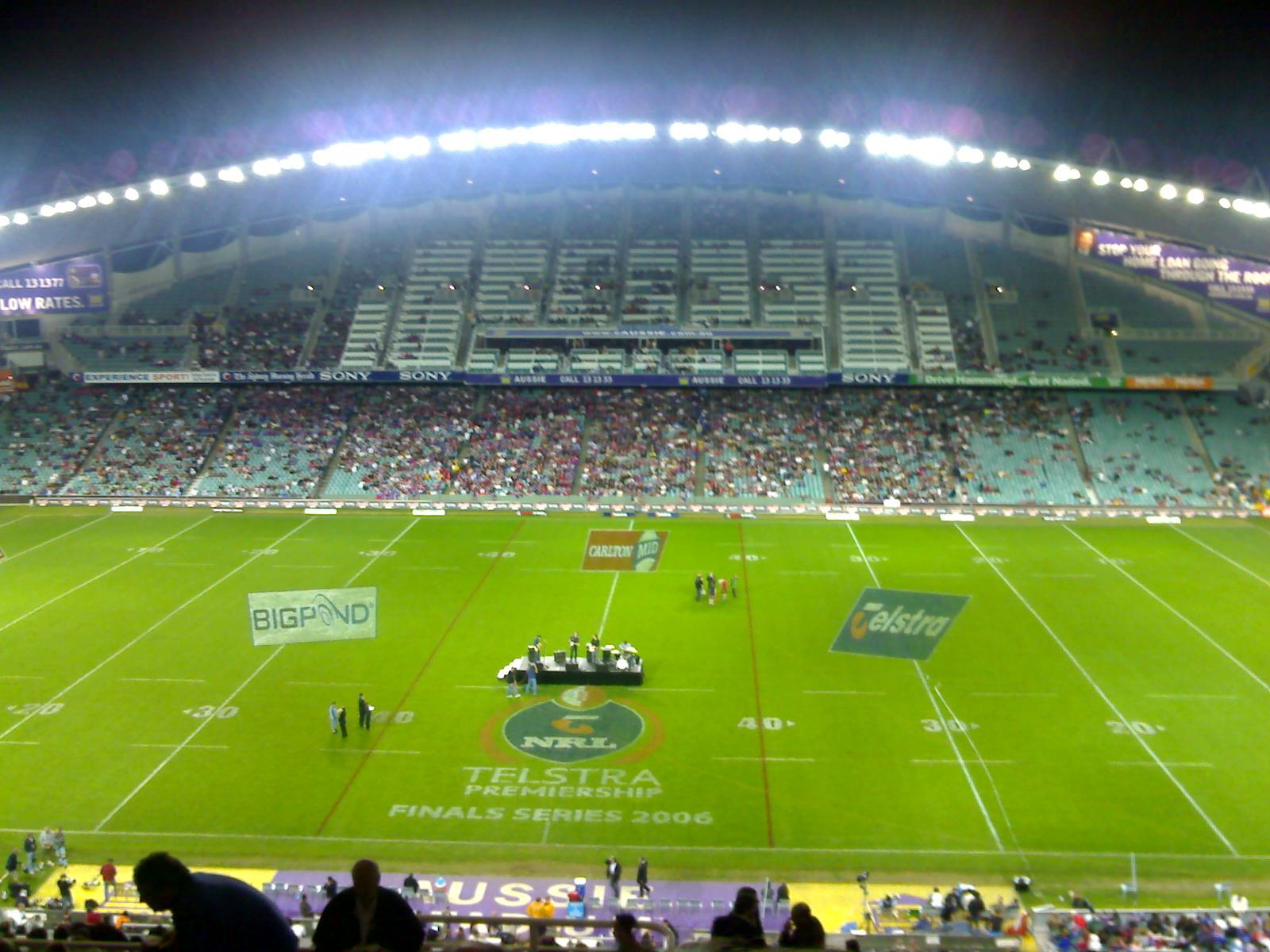
The Sydney Football Stadium as it appears while hosting a National Rugby League finals match.

Most sources suggest that the Royal Agricultural Ground was often used as a home venue between 1908 and 1910, before the club hosted matches at the Sydney Sports Ground from 1911 onwards. It was here that the team played almost all of their home games up until 1986, when the ground was demolished with the Sydney Cricket Ground No. 2 to make way for Sydney's main rectangular field, the Sydney Football Stadium. In 1987, games were moved away to the Newtown Jets' home ground, Henson Park, temporarily to await the completion of the Sydney Football Stadium. The team capitalised on this move, and under coach Arthur Beetson finished second in the regular season, and narrowly missed playing in the grand final. It was the only time between 1983 and 1995 that the club reached the finals.

In 1988, the club moved its home ground to the newly built Sydney Football Stadium on the site of the old Sydney Sports Ground, opening the season with a 24–14 defeat at the hands of the St George Dragons in front of 19,295 spectators on a wet night on 4 March 1988. At the Sydney Football Stadium, the Roosters have a 59% win record from 256 games with a 58% and 55% win record at former home grounds the Sydney Sports Ground and the Sydney Cricket Ground respectively.

The Roosters played their last game, a Preliminary Final against South Sydney, at the Sydney Football Stadium on 22 September 2018 in front of a ground record crowd of 44,380. In 2019, the Sydney Roosters home became the Sydney Cricket Ground whilst the replacement Sydney Football Stadium (2022) was being built.

== Supporters and geographical area ==
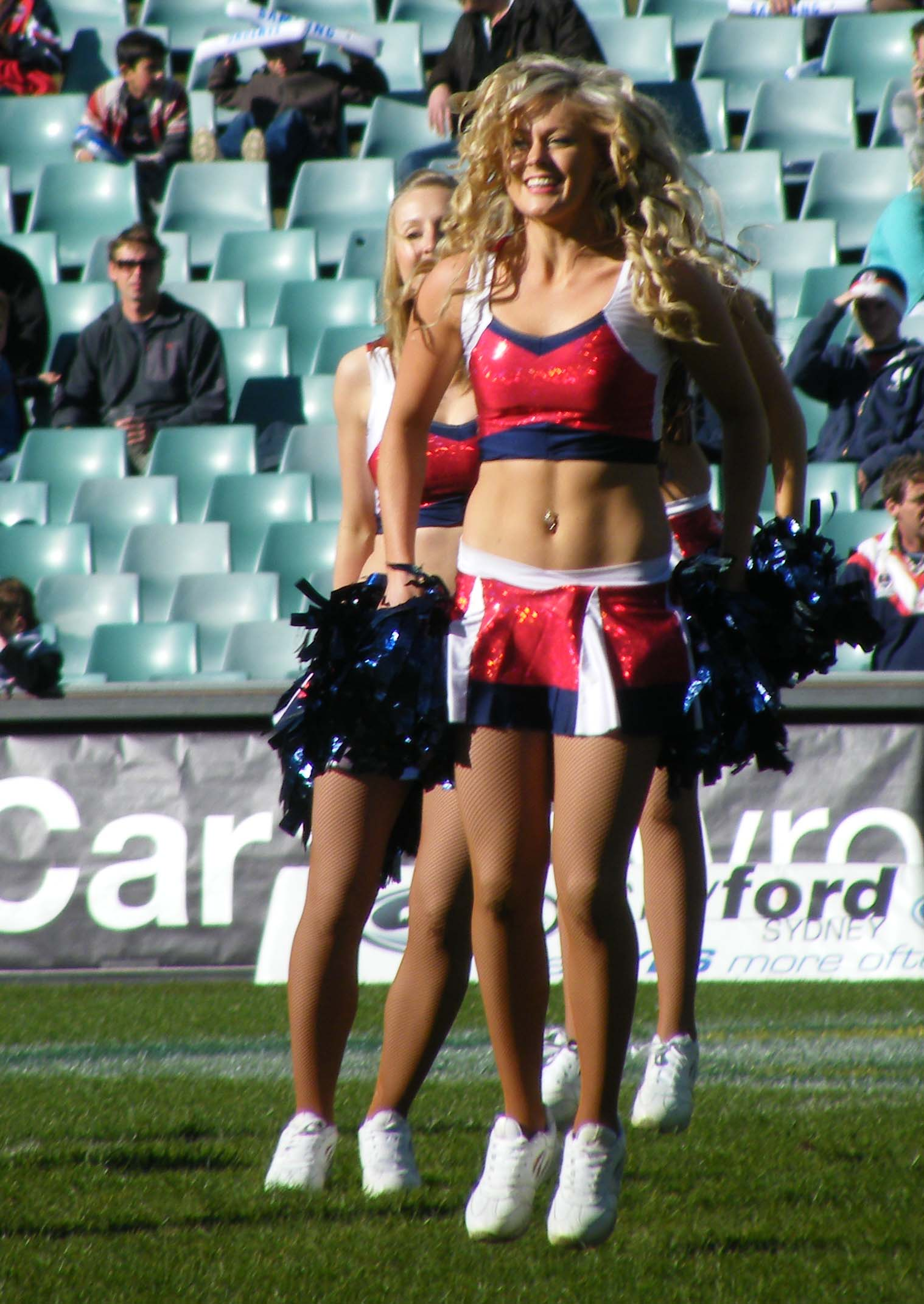
Sydney Roosters Girls cheering for the crowd.

Their main fan base is in Sydney, with particular concentration in Sydney's East.Traditionally they represented the entirety of the Eastern Suburbs (being at the time the municipalities of Paddington, Woollahra, Vaucluse, Randwick and Waverley with many of these councils now since being amalgamated together) however due to junior team boundary lines changing in the late 1930's (of which many Roosters supporters have viewed as bias due to administrator conflicts of interest) the lower part of the Eastern Suburbs from Maroubra to La Perouse were taken off the Roosters and given to the Rabbitohs. However their original articles of association from 1908 still haven't been changed meaning technically at a senior level the Roosters still represent the whole area. Currently though the suburbs represented by the Sydney Roosters as still traditional Eastern Suburbs heartland include Woolloomooloo, Potts Point, Darling Point, Kings Cross, Elizabeth Bay, Rushcutters Bay, Darlinghurst, Surry Hills, Double Bay, Point Piper, Bellevue Hill, Vaucluse, Dover Heights, Rose Bay, Watsons Bay, Paddington, Woollahra, Moore Park, Centennial Park, North Bondi, Bondi, Bondi Junction, Bondi Beach, Tamarama, Waverley, Bronte, Clovelly, Kensington, Randwick, Coogee and South Coogee.

Compared to the early days though the team has now branched out due to the changing demographics of that region with most fans of the club coming from outside the traditional area. Due to the affluence of the Eastern Suburbs, the Roosters fanbase is often perceived as affluent White Collar and Upper Class, although the club (like other Rugby League clubs) was formed mostly by players with a working class background.

They have an estimated 800k fans due to a club estimate. When calculating their 'average exposure value' across the 2019, 2020 and 2021 seasons it was determined that they were the most watched NRL club and the third most watched club across all sporting codes in Australia. They had 18.6 million game views in 2021 alone.

In the premiership winning season of 2013 the club tallied the fourth-highest home attendance of all National Rugby League clubs with an average of 19,368 spectators at the Sydney Football Stadium. This figure does not factor in whether supporters are from the home or away team. Following the re-opening of the newly renovated Sydney Football Stadium, during the 2023 season the Roosters recorded the third-highest average home attendance in the NRL and the highest outside of Queensland with an average of 22,898. This figure was boosted by the fact that the club was the designated "home team" for Magic Round and for the traditional ANZAC Day game. Again in 2024 they recorded the third-highest average home attendance and the most in NSW with 23,364.

At the club's home ground, the Sydney Football Stadium, the supporters congregate in distinct sections. The "Chook Pen", a designated area in Bays 35-37, is the preferred location for the most animated fans. Members of the Sydney Cricket and Sports Ground Trust are seated in the Members Pavilion, and season ticket holders are located in Bays 12–14.

In 2026, the Roosters had over 24,000 paying members which ranked them with the fifth most memberships out of the nine Sydney teams, in addition to the 46,486 members of the Easts Leagues Club, which is the major benefactor of the football club. The Easts Leagues Club and the Sydney Roosters "operate as one entity" known as the Easts Group. Under this arrangement, the Eastern Suburbs District Rugby League Football Club is the 'parent company' of the Easts Group. The Football Club delegates, however, overarching responsibility for both football and leagues club operations to a single general manager who oversees the group's performance. The leagues club provides financial support to the football club only when necessary as the football club's sponsorships and TV revenues are generally adequate to cover most Rugby League expenditures.

=== Notable supporters ===
- Doug Bollinger
  cricketer
- Mark Bouris
  businessman
- Guillaume Brahimi
  chef
- Daryl Braithwaite
  Singer
- Simon Burke
  actor
- Scott Cam
  television host
- Bob Carr
  39th Premier of New South Wales
- Harry Connick Jr.
  American singer, pianist, composer, actor, and television host
- General Sir Peter Cosgrove
  26th Governor-General of Australia
- George Donikian
  news presenter
- Johnny Fisher
  British Heavyweight Boxer
- Luke Foley
  37th New South Wales Opposition Leader
- Sir James Darcy Freeman
  Catholic Cardinal
- Isaac Heeney
  AFL Player
- Wim Hof
  Dutch motivational speaker and extreme athlete
- Hulk Hogan
  retired American professional wrestler
- Bruce Hopkins
  Head lifeguard at Bondi Beach and featuring in the TV show 'Bondi Rescue'
- John Ibrahim
  former Kings Cross nightclub owner, writer and alleged organised crime figure
- George Kambosos Jr.
  professional boxer and former world champion
- Amanda Keller
  media personality
- Paul Kelly
  Australian rules football player
- Krunoslav Lovrek
- Nick Kyrgios
  Australian Professional Tennis Player
- Joel Labi
  journalist
- Harold Larwood
  cricketer
- Erin McNaught
  media personality
- Brett Ogle
  professional golfer
- Peter O'Malley
  professional golfer
- Nick Scott
  American football safety
- Paul Sheehan
  columnist
- Steve Smith
  former captain of the Australia cricket team
- Malcolm Turnbull
  29th Prime Minister of Australia
- Grayson Waller
  WWE Wrestler, Reality TV Star & Actor
- Kate Waterhouse
  media personality
- David Warner
  former vice captain of the Australia cricket team
- Tim Webster
  radio and television personality
- Gus Worland
  Media personality

== Statistics and records ==
Jared Waerea-Hargreaves holds the record for the most first grade games (307), having surpassed Mitchell Aubusson's tally of 306 matches in round 19 of the 2024 season. Former team captain Craig Fitzgibbon holds the club record for scoring the most points, tallying 1,376 over his 210 matches. Fitzgibbon also broke the all-time point scoring record for a forward in the later rounds of 2006. Dave Brown's tally of 45 points (five tries and 15 goals) in a single match against Canterbury in 1935 remains a competition record after more than seven decades. Ivan Cleary scored 284 points in 1998, which at the time was an all-time points scoring record in a season.

Bill Mullins, father of 2002 premiership player Brett, scored 104 tries in his 11-year, 190-game career with Eastern Suburbs between 1968 and 1978, meaning that on average, he scored at least one try every two games. Anthony Minichiello became the highest try scorer in the Roosters history when he scored his 105th try against the Newcastle at Ausgrid Stadium in June 2011. 'Mini' finally retired after the 2014 season, and ended his career with 139 tries. He is also the first fullback in 70 years to win the Grand Final (2013), while captaining the club. Rod O'Loan scored seven tries in a single match against Sydney University in 1935, and Dave Brown's 38 tries in 15 games in the same year remains a competition record.

In 1975, the Eastern Suburbs Roosters set a record 19-match winning streak on their way to their 11th premiership. In a 1935 match against Canterbury, Dave Brown scored 45 points, the highest score and victory margin for the club (the 87–7 scoreline is equivalent to 106–8 under the contemporary scoring system). The winning margin is the second largest overall, behind St. George's 91–6 win over Canterbury a week earlier.

The club's record attendance for a regular season game at its home ground—the Sydney Football Stadium—stands at 40,864, achieved in a match on ANZAC Day against the St George Illawarra Dragons in 2017. The club's record attendance for a regular season game at the SCG stands at 50,130 on 4 May 1974 against the Manly Sea Eagles

The 2000 grand final between the Sydney Roosters and the Brisbane Broncos attracted 94,277 spectators to the Olympic Stadium.

== Squads ==
=== Current squad ===
Sydney Roosters 2026 squad
| Top 30 squad - 2026 NRL season | | | Supplementary list | Coaching staff |
|---|---|---|---|---|
| Egan Butcher – LK, SR; Nat Butcher – SR, PR, LK; Daly Cherry-Evans – FE, HB; Lindsay Collins – PR; Angus Crichton – SR; Jake Elliott – FE, HK; Salesi Foketi – SR, LK; Ben Ioelu – HK; Spencer Leniu – PR; Taylor Losalu – PR | Mark Nawaqanitawase – WG; Fetalaiga Pauga – CE; Cody Ramsey – FB, WG; Victor Radley – LK; Reece Robson – HK; Toby Rodwell – HB; Tom Rodwell – WG; Hugo Savala – CE, FE, HB; Billy Smith – CE, WG; Blake Steep – LK | Tommy Talau – WG, CE; James Tedesco (c) – FB; Robert Toia – CE; Daniel Tupou – WG; Junior Tupou – WG; De La Salle Va'a – PR; Sam Walker – HB; Connor Watson – HK, LK; Naufahu Whyte – PR; Siua Wong – SR | Rex Bassingthwaighte – WG; Reece Foley – CE, FE; Extended squad: Hayden Barton – SR; Lui Lee – CE; Ashton Warwick – SR | Head coach: Trent Robinson; Assistant coaches: Matt King; Michael Cheika; Tait Barnes; Brett Morris (NSW Cup Coach/NRL Assistant Coach); Dean Feeney (Jersey Flegg Coach); Managers: Mitchell Aubusson (Director of Football); Joel Carbone (Head of Recruitment); Legend: (c) Captain(s); (vc) Vice-captain(s); Updated: 22 November 2026; Source(s): Roosters team profiles |

=== Team of the Century ===
In 2000, the Sydney Roosters named their "Team of the Century", which included players from 1908 to 2000. The official team is listed below along with their Sydney Roosters cap number.

Team of the Century
| First team squad | | Coaching staff |
|---|---|---|
| 639 Russell Fairfax – FB; 587 Bill Mullins – WG; 18 Dally Messenger – CE; 202 David Brown – CE; 315 Lionel Cooper – WG; 948 Brad Fittler – FE; 210 Viv Thicknesse – HB; 190 Ray Stehr – PR; 10 Sandy Pearce – HK; 615 Arthur Beetson – PR; 625 Ron Coote – SR; 193 Joe Pearce – SR; 234 Andy Norval – LK | 674 Kevin Hastings; 232 Jack Beaton; 66 Jack Watkins; 570 Barry Reilly | Head coach: Jack Gibson; Legend: (c) Captain(s); (vc) Vice-captain(s); Updated: 22 October 2011; Source(s): Player List (archived) |

=== The Centurions ===
In 2007, the Sydney Roosters announced "The Centurions", a team consisting of those regarded as the greatest players to have played 100 or more games for the club between 1908 and 2007. The team was selected by Ray Chesterton, Ian Heads, David Middleton and Alan Clarkson and was unveiled at the centenary season launch at the Michael Algeri Pavilion on 10 March 2007.

The Centurions
| First team squad | | Coaching staff |
|---|---|---|
| 994 Anthony Minichiello – FB; 587 Bill Mullins – WG; 608 Mark Harris – CE; 595 John Brass – CE; 650 Ian Schubert – WG; 948 Brad Fittler – FE; 674 Kevin Hastings – HB; 190 Ray Stehr – PR; 10 Sandy Pearce – HK; 615 Arthur Beetson (c) – PR; 625 Ron Coote – SR; 193 Joe Pearce – SR; 234 Andy Norval – LK | 989 Craig Fitzgibbon – SR; 206 Ernie Norman; 884 Luke Ricketson – LK; 570 Barry Reilly | Head coach: Jack Gibson; Legend: (c) Captain(s); (vc) Vice-captain(s); Updated: 22 October 2011; Source(s): Centurions |

== Honours ==
=== Titles ===
Premierships – 16
1911, 1912, 1913, 1923, 1935, 1936, 1937, 1940, 1945, 1974, 1975, 2002, 2013, 2018, 2019, 2026

Runners-up – 15
1908, 1919, 1921, 1928, 1931, 1934, 1938, 1941, 1960, 1972, 1980, 2000, 2003, 2004, 2010

Minor Premierships – 20
1912, 1913, 1923, 1931, 1934, 1935, 1936, 1937, 1940, 1941, 1945, 1974, 1975, 1980, 1981, 2004, 2013, 2014, 2015, 2018

World Club Challenge – 5
1976, 2003, 2014, 2019, 2020

Amco Cup – 2
1975, 1978

City Cup – 3
1914, 1915, 1916

Auckland Nines – 1
2017

World Sevens – 1
1993

=== Youth/Pre-season Titles ===
Club Championship – 12
1930, 1931, 1934, 1935, 1936, 1937, 1945, 1970, 1974, 1975, 2004, 2006

Second Grade – 9
1908, 1909, 1910, 1911, 1935, 1937, 1949, 1986, 2004

Third Grade/Under 23 – 11
1914, 1917, 1924, 1929, 1930, 1931, 1932, 1941, 1947, 1970, 1976

Preseason Cup – 4
1974, 1977, 1979, 1981

Under-20s Competition – 1
2016

Jersey Flegg Cup – 3
1995, 2002, 2004

Presidents Cup – 16
1910, 1911, 1913, 1915, 1920, 1922, 1923, 1924, 1927, 1938, 1948, 1949, 1955, 1978, 1993

S. G. Ball Cup – 5
1997, 2008, 2010, 2014 , 2025

The Knock On Effect NSW Cup – 0

NRL State Championship – 0

== Women's team ==
On 27 March 2018, the Sydney Roosters applied for, and won, a license to participate in the inaugural 2018 NRL Women's season. Adam Hartigan was named as the coach of the women's side.

In June 2018, the club used up the maximum of fifteen marquee signings ahead of the inaugural season which subsequently commenced in September. Players signed included Karina Brown, Isabelle Kelly and Ruan Sims.

The club finished runners-up in the inaugural NRL Women's Premiership, losing to the Brisbane Broncos by 34–12 in the 2018 NRL Women's Premiership Grand Final. Zahara Temara claimed the 2018 Player of the Season award.

In 2019, Rick Stone took over as coach. The club, however, failed to win a match, claiming the wooden spoon. Tallisha Harden was awarded the club's Best & Fairest Player for the 2019 season.

Jamie Feeney was appointed the head coach for the 2020 season, being determined to turn the club's fortunes around. He was assisted by Kylie Hilder and John Strange. Feeney immediately appointed Corban McGregor as the club's new captain. The club also announced the big signing of Sevens Rugby star and 2016 Gold Medalist, Charlotte Caslick. The Roosters again made the Grand Final but were beaten again by Brisbane in the Grand Final 20-10.

In 2021, John Strange became senior coach and the club went on a golden run, winning 3 premierships in 2021, 2024 and 2026. In the latter of those years, the Roosters completed a perfect season, going undefeated in 13 games including the finals. In achieving this, the club became the first first-grade side to win every match in a season since South Sydney in 1925.
