= 1964 NSWRFL season =

Rugby league competition

1964 New South Wales Rugby Football League
- Teams: 10
- Premiers: St. George (11th title)
- Minor premiers: St. George (10th title)
- Matches played: 94
- Points scored: 2736
- Total attendance: 1197569
- Top points scorer: Fred Griffiths (160)
- Wooden spoon: Canterbury-Bankstown (3rd spoon)
- Top try-scorer: Reg Gasnier (18)

The 1964 NSWRFL season was the fifty-seventh season of Sydney's professional rugby league football competition, the New South Wales Rugby Football League Premiership, Australia's first. Ten clubs from across the city competed for the J. J. Giltinan Shield and the WD & HO Wills Cup during the season, which culminated in a grand final between St. George and Balmain.

== Teams ==
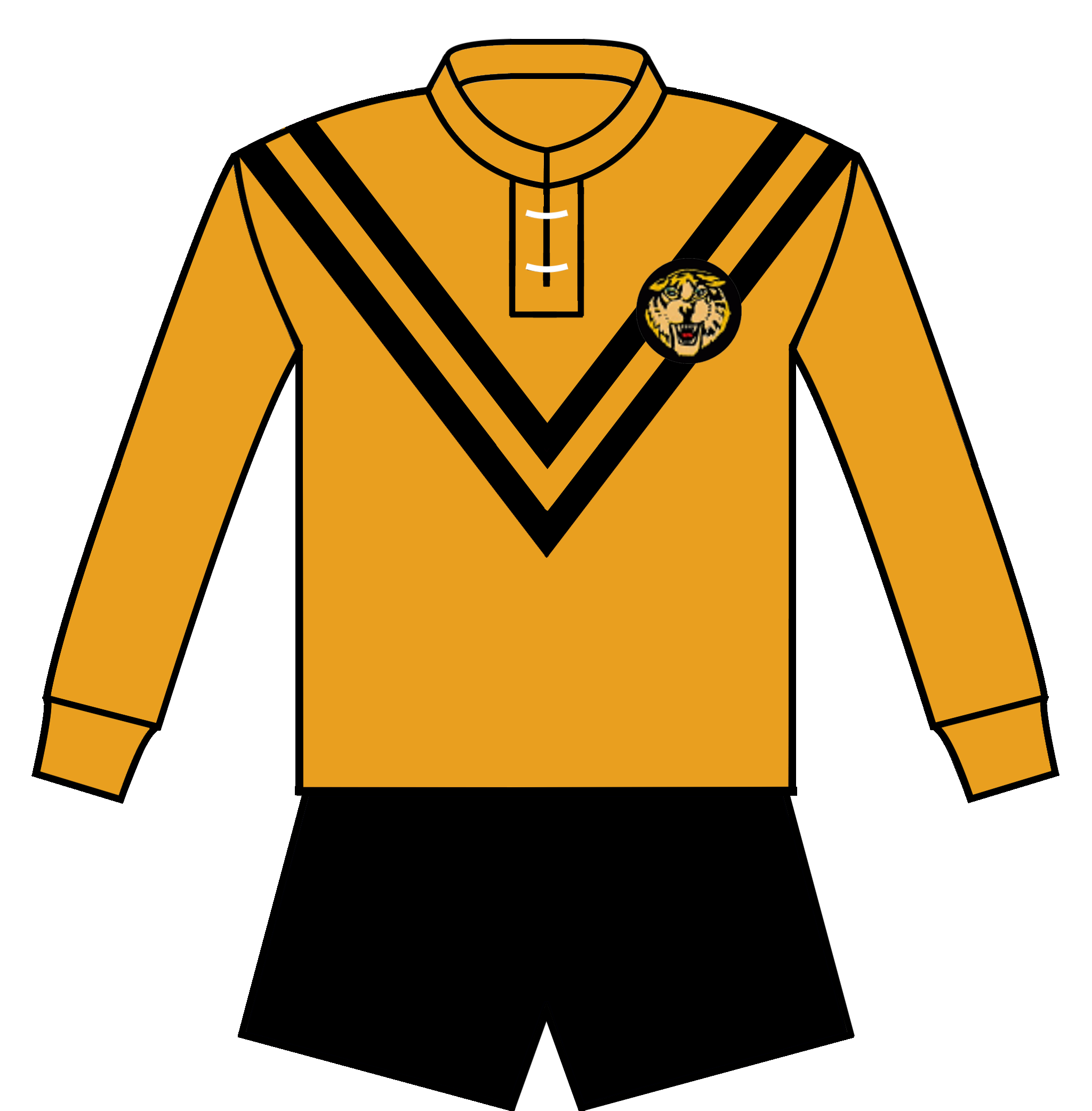
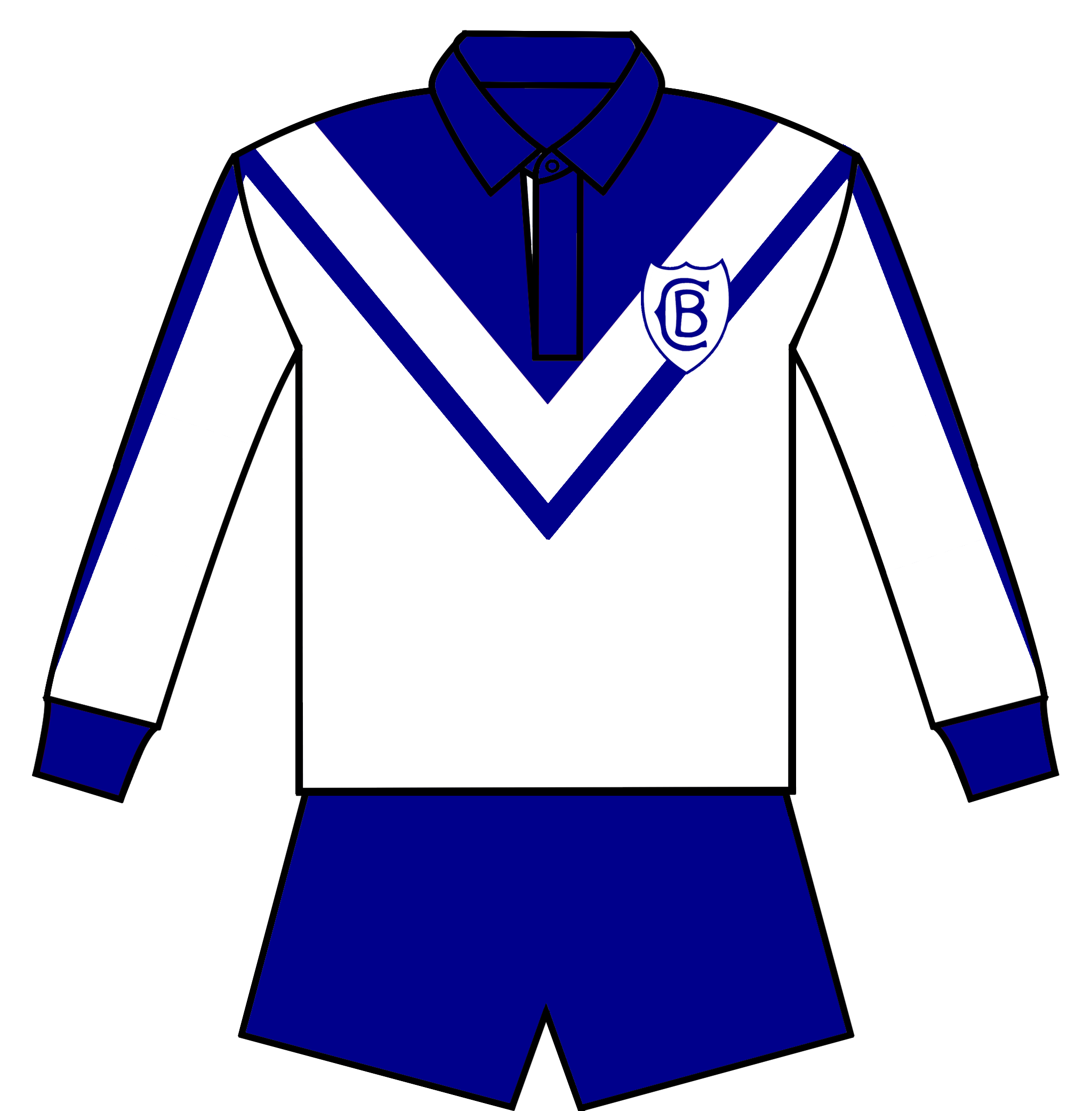
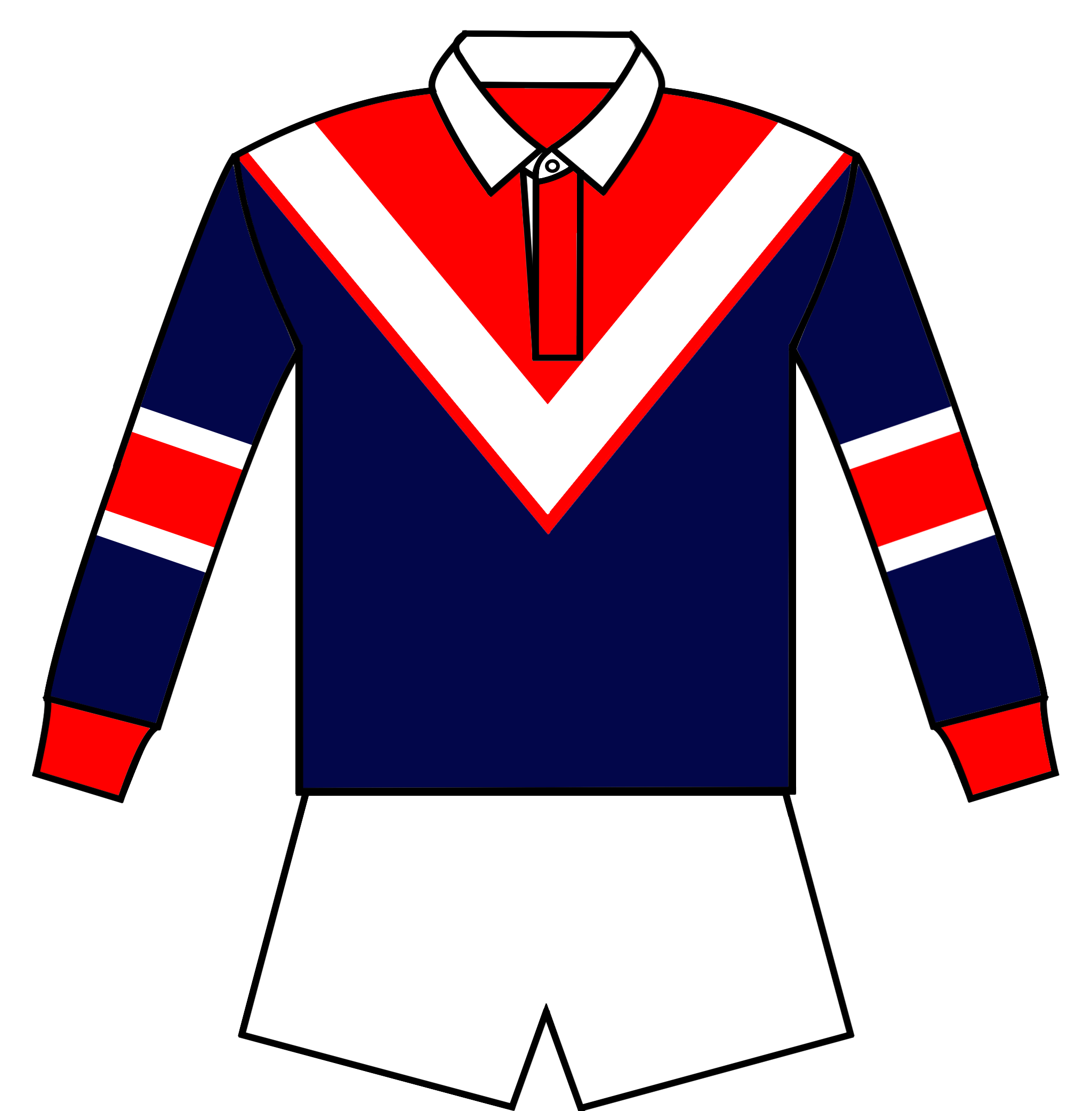
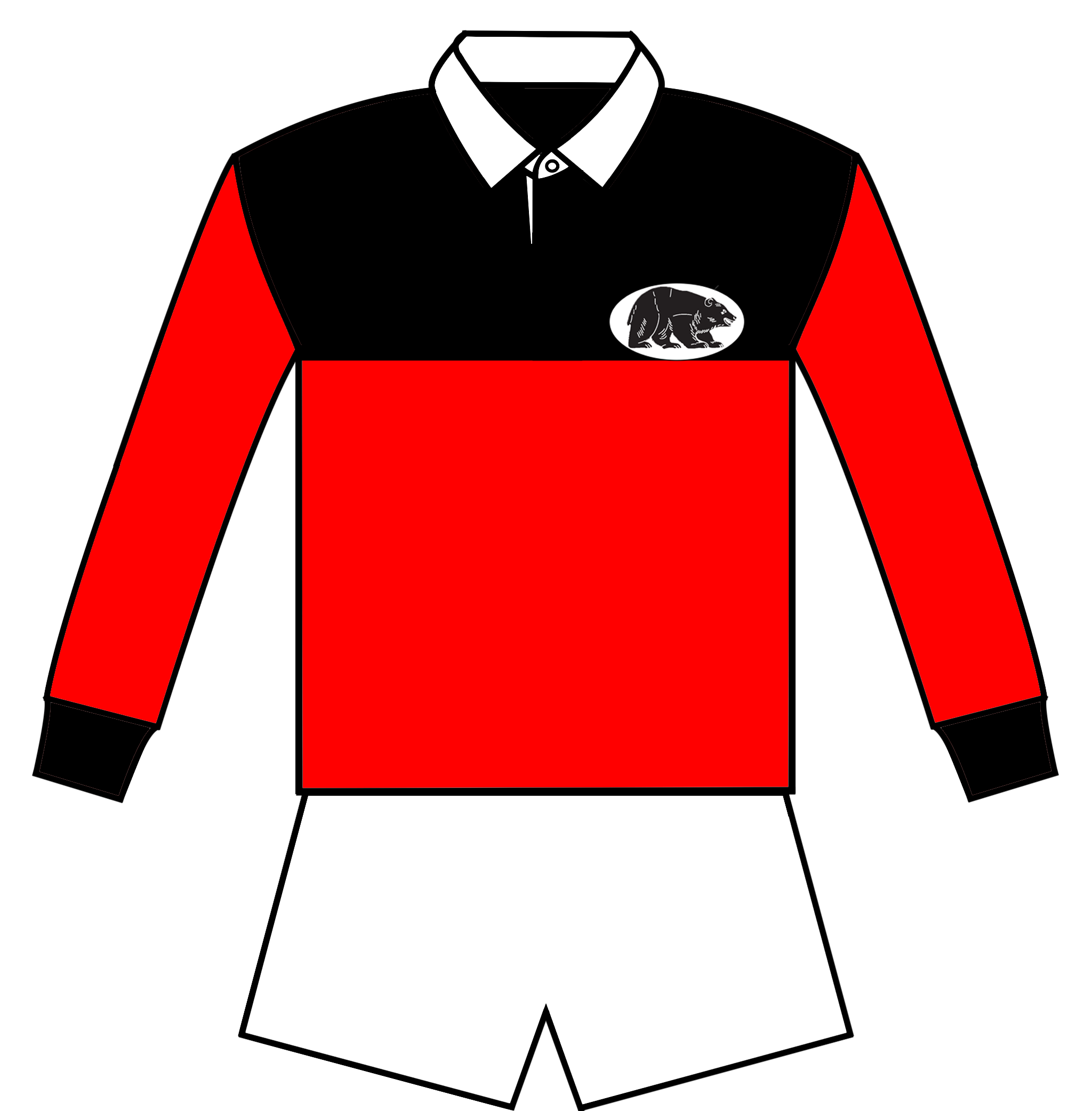
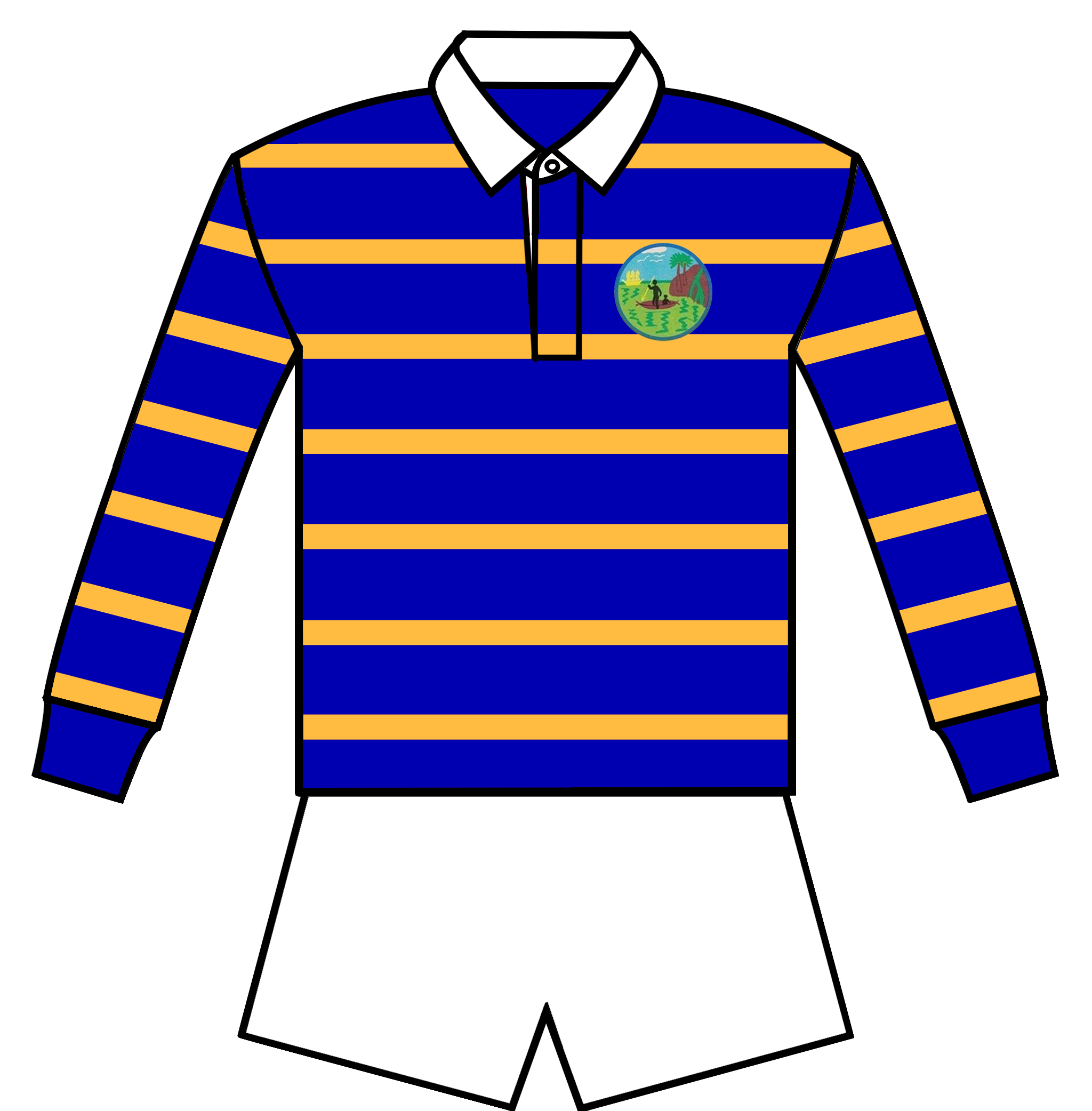
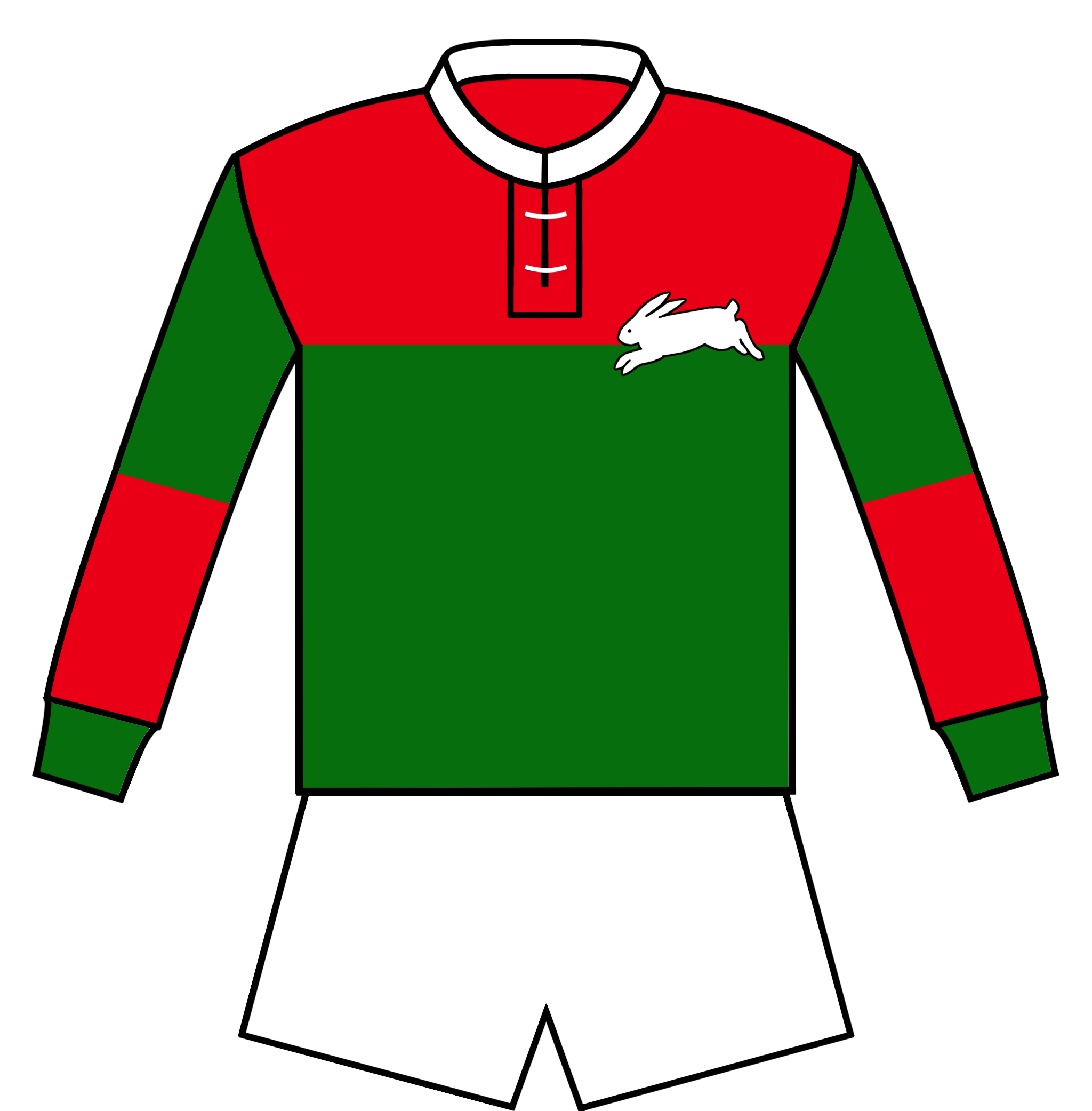
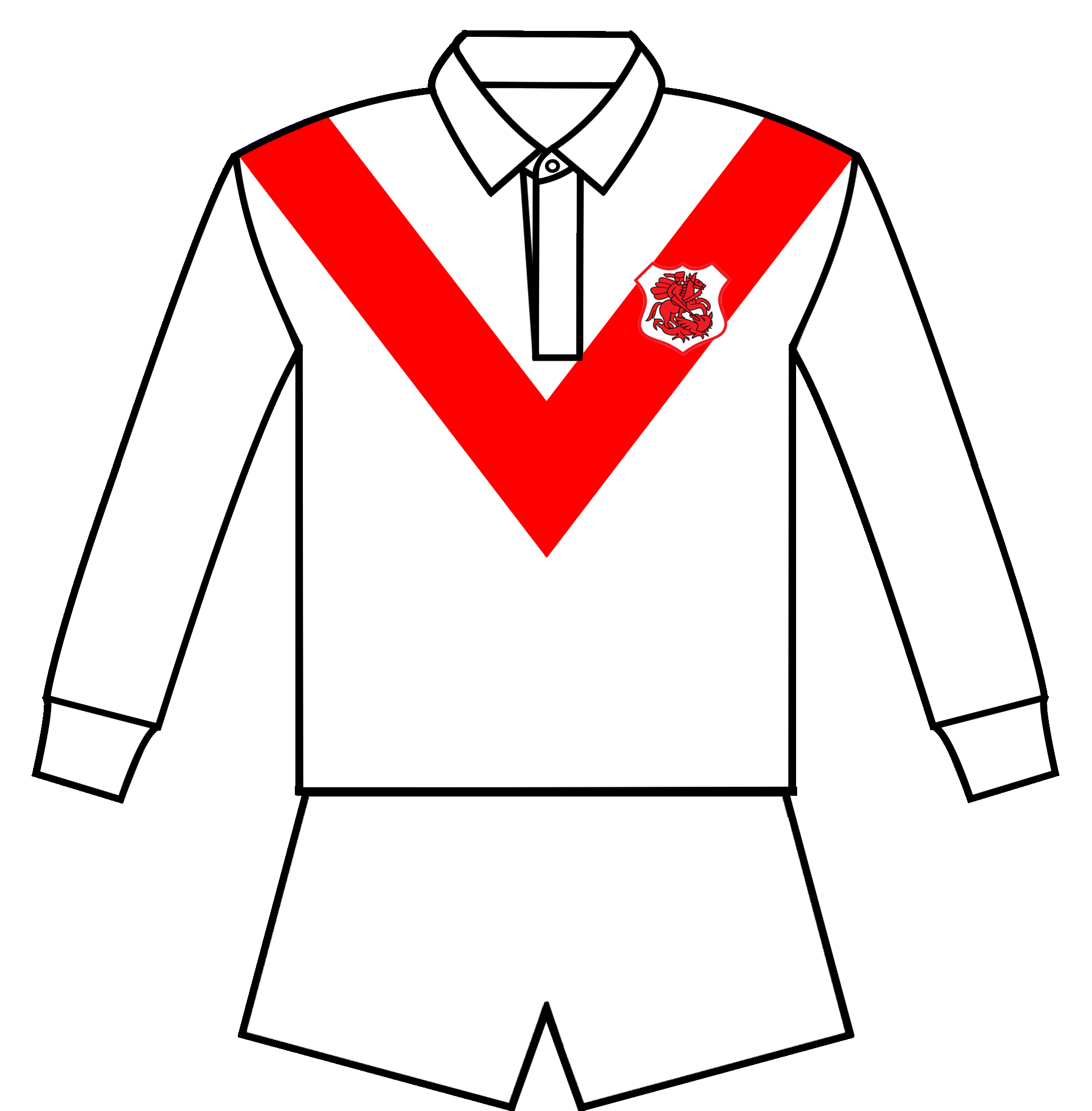
| Balmain 57th season Ground: Leichhardt Oval; Coach: Harry Bath; Captain: Keith Barnes | Canterbury-Bankstown 30th season Ground: Belmore Oval; Coach: Clive Churchill; Captain: Les Johns | Eastern Suburbs 57th season Ground: Sydney Sports Ground; Captain-Coach: Nat Silcock Jr. | Manly-Warringah 18th season Ground: Brookvale Oval; Coach: Tony Paskins; Captain: Barry O'Connell, Tony Paskins | Newtown 57th season Ground: Henson Park; Coach: Allan Ellis; Captain: Tony Brown |
| North Sydney 57th season Ground: North Sydney Oval; Captain-Coach: Fred Griffiths | Parramatta 18th season Ground: Cumberland Oval; Coach: Ken Kearney; Captain: Ron Lynch | South Sydney 57th season Ground: Redfern Oval; Coach: Bernie Purcell; Captains: Darrel Chapman, Jim Lisle | St. George 44th season Ground: Kogarah Jubilee Oval; Captain-coach: Norm Provan | Western Suburbs 57th season Ground: Pratten Park; Coach: Jack Fitzgerald; Captain: Noel Kelly |

== Ladder ==
| | Team | Pld | W | D | L | PF | PA | PD | Pts |
|---|---|---|---|---|---|---|---|---|---|
| 1 | St. George | 18 | 15 | 0 | 3 | 393 | 154 | +239 | 30 |
| 2 | Parramatta | 18 | 14 | 0 | 4 | 274 | 188 | +86 | 28 |
| 3 | Balmain | 18 | 12 | 0 | 6 | 247 | 192 | +55 | 24 |
| 4 | North Sydney | 18 | 11 | 1 | 6 | 334 | 257 | +77 | 23 |
| 5 | South Sydney | 18 | 11 | 0 | 7 | 304 | 250 | +54 | 22 |
| 6 | Newtown | 18 | 9 | 0 | 9 | 236 | 268 | -32 | 18 |
| 7 | Western Suburbs | 18 | 8 | 1 | 9 | 259 | 274 | -15 | 17 |
| 8 | Manly | 18 | 5 | 1 | 12 | 229 | 331 | -102 | 11 |
| 9 | Eastern Suburbs | 18 | 2 | 0 | 16 | 190 | 351 | -161 | 4 |
| 10 | Canterbury | 18 | 1 | 1 | 16 | 168 | 369 | -201 | 3 |

== Finals ==
| Home | Score | Away | Match information |
| Home | Score | Away | Date and time | Venue | Referee | Crowd |
|---|---|---|---|---|---|---|
Semi-finals
| Balmain | 11–9 | North Sydney | 29 August 1964 | Sydney Cricket Ground | Jack Bradley | 35,082 |
| St. George | 42–0 | Parramatta | 5 September 1964 | Sydney Cricket Ground | Col Pearce | 33,659 |
Preliminary Final
| Parramatta | 7–16 | Balmain | 12 September 1964 | Sydney Cricket Ground | Col Pearce | 35,389 |
Grand Final
| St. George | 11–6 | Balmain | 19 September 1964 | Sydney Cricket Ground | Col Pearce | 61,369 |

=== Grand Final ===
| St. George | Position | Balmain |
|---|---|---|
| 1. Graeme Langlands | FB | 1. Keith Barnes (c) |
| 2. Johnny King | WG | 2. Dick Quinn |
| 3. Reg Gasnier | CE | 3. Brian Dunlop |
| 4. Billy Smith | CE | 4. Robert Ridley |
| 5. Eddie Lumsden | WG | 5. Bob Mara |
| 6. Brian Clay | FE | 6. Jack Danzey |
| 7. George Evans | HB | 7. Billy Bischoff Jr. |
| 13. Monty Porter | PR | 13. Bob Boland |
| 12. Peter Armstrong | HK | 12. Dick Wilson |
| 11. Kevin Ryan | PR | 11. George Piper |
| 10. Elton Rasmussen | SR | 10. Ron Clothier |
| 9. Norm Provan (Ca./Co.) | SR | 9. Peter Provan |
| 8. Johnny Raper | LK | 8. Dennis Tutty |
| | Coach | Harry Bath |

St. George captain-coach Norm Provan was matching up against his younger brother (and former Dragon) Peter, who had moved to the Tigers in 1961.

The Tigers’ defence was strong throughout a dour first half and for the first time in nine grand finals the Dragons trailed at half-time (4–2) with Balmain in the lead after penalty goals from Keith "Golden Boots" Barnes.

The turning point of the match came five minutes into the second half. The Tigers were defending their own line with some desperate tackling when they received a relieving penalty from referee Pearce. Balmain's Bob Boland put in a big punt which at first looked like a good touch finder. To Balmain's horror, Graeme Langlands stretched and then caught the ball with his boots only an inch or two from the touchline. The champion fullback then raced cross-field towards the Balmain line and sent a cut-out pass to Billy Smith 25 yards out from the tryline. The centre made further inroads before channeling a pass to Johnny King who sped down the left wing for 20 yards to score a diving try.

Test winger Johnny King thus kept intact his grand final record with this being his fifth successive try in a decider.

Eighteen-year-old Dennis Tutty stood out for the Tigers, providing reliable cover defence that stopped the Dragons on numerous occasions. For St. George, Smith and Langlands had strong games with Langlands tallying 72 points in his last four games of the season. Brian Clay had by now reclaimed his five-eighth position from Bruce Pollard and excelled just as he had in his five previous Grand Final appearances.

St. George 11 (Tries: King. Goals: Langlands 4.)

Balmain 6 (Goals: Barnes 3.)

== Player statistics ==
The following statistics are as of the conclusion of Round 18.

Top 5 point scorers

| Points | Player | Tries | Goals | Field Goals |
|---|---|---|---|---|
| 154 | Fred Griffiths | 2 | 74 | 0 |
| 131 | Ken Bray | 1 | 64 | 0 |
| 128 | Brian Graham | 2 | 61 | 0 |
| 115 | Greg McMillan | 3 | 53 | 0 |
| 82 | Brian Hambly | 0 | 41 | 0 |

Top 5 try scorers

| Tries | Player |
|---|---|
| 16 | Reg Gasnier |
| 16 | Nick Yakich |
| 15 | Ken Irvine |
| 14 | Michael Cleary |
| 11 | Johnny King |

Top 5 goal scorers

| Goals | Player |
|---|---|
| 74 | Fred Griffiths |
| 64 | Ken Bray |
| 61 | Brian Graham |
| 53 | Greg McMillan |
| 41 | Brian Hambly |

== Season notes ==
- The Canterbury-Bankstown Bulldogs' wooden spoon season was their last until 2002, when they were sentenced to finish last that season as punishment due to gross salary cap breaches uncovered by the NRL in August that year. It wouldn't be until 2008 that they would again finish last as a result of poor on-field performances during the season.
