= 2019 Group 10 Rugby League season =

2019 Group 10 Rugby League
- Teams: 9
- Premiers: Bathurst Panthers (4th title)
- Minor premiers: Orange Hawks (9th title)
- Matches played: 78
- Points scored: 3654 (46.85 per game)
- Top points scorer: Willie Wright - 181 (Bathurst Panthers)
- Player of the year: Nathan Potts (Orange Hawks)
- Top try-scorer(s): Jared Robinson - 16 (Mudgee Dragons); Ryan Griffin - 16 (Orange CYMS)

The 2019 Group 10 Rugby League season was the 73rd season of the premier rugby league competition in the Central West area of New South Wales. It was run under the auspices of the Country Rugby League. It was the seventh consecutive season to feature nine teams, after the re-admittance of the Blayney Bears in 2013.

Bathurst Panthers entered the season as defending champions, after defeating Cowra Magpies 12–10 in the 2018 Premier League decider. Panthers five-eighth and goal kicker Willie Wright kicked a match-winning conversion with four minutes remaining in the decider played at Cowra's Sid Kallas Oval, sealing Panthers first Premier League title since 2007.

Panthers would defend its title with a 9–8 win over Mudgee Dragons in the grand final at Carrington Park that went to extra-time.

== Off-season signings ==
Team	In	Out
Bathurst Panthers	Kevin Murray (Moore Park), Max Gay (Yanco-Wamoon), Louis Murphy (Walgett)	Jye Barrow (Molong), Kade Barrow (Molong), Blake Hewitt (Young)
Bathurst St Patrick's	Luke Branighan (Oberon), Mickey Hawkings (Oberon), Traie Merritt (Forbes)	Josh Howarth (Lithgow), Sam Dwyer (Parkes), Brandon Tago (Parkes)
Blayney Bears	Steve Lane (Cargo), Leigh Monaghan (St Patrick's), Chris Shepherd (Bathurst Panthers)	Tim Mortimer (Orange CYMS), Mitch Evers (Northern Rivers RRL)
Cowra Magpies	Lewis Dwyer (Parkes), Claude Gordon (Dubbo Westside), Logan Harris (Newcastle)	
Lithgow Workmen's Club	Jack Sullivan (West Harbour, rugby union), Josh Howarth (St Patrick's), Tui Oloapu (Oberon)	
Mudgee Dragons	Jack Littlejohn (Salford), Casey Burgess (Lakes United), Grant Moore (Gymea Gorillas), Nick Harvey (Dubbo CYMS), Jayden Brown (Canowindra), Tom Shearman (Lakes United), Austin Burgess (Lakes United), Harry Myers (Milton-Ulladulla), Nick Wilson (Canowindra), Ben Thompson (Gulgong), James Okell (injury)	Nathan O'Brien (retired)
Oberon Tigers	Matt Ranse (Blackheath), Richard Peckham (Wellington), Farren Lamb (Forbes)	Luke Branighan (St Patrick's), Mickey Hawkings (St Patrick's), Ben McAlpine (Orange CYMS), Dallas Booth (Portland), Tui Oloapu (Lithgow), Dave Sellers (boxing), Tyler Hughes (Newcastle)
Orange CYMS	Ben McAlpine (Oberon), Tim Mortimer (Orange CYMS), Steve Morris, Jake Williams (East Campbelltown), Jarred Tyack (Forbes), Kain Earsman (Canowindra), Joseph Ualesi (Parramatta), Josh Burke (Campbelltown City)	Mick Sullivan (Wingham)
Orange Hawks	Jared Brodrick (Corrimal), Alex Prout (Parkes), Matt Boss (Berkeley)	Kyle Robbins (Port City Breakers), Tatafu Naaniumotu (Woodbridge Cup), Sia Nemani (Woodbridge Cup)

== Premier League season summary ==
Eighteen rounds was played between March and August, which concluded with a finals played under the top five McIntyre system. Bathurst Panthers played its round one match against Blayney Bears on March 30 at Carrington Park. The match acted as a curtain raiser to NRL match between the Penrith Panthers and Melbourne Storm later that evening. The remainder of the first round of Group 10 Premier League was played on weekend beginning on April 13.

Orange Hawks claimed the minor premiership, but were bundled out in straight sets to be the first minor premier to miss the grand final since 1998, which ironically was the Orange Hawks. The grand final was played between the Bathurst Panthers and Mudgee Dragons. The match went to extra-time after the match finished 8–all after 80 minutes. Panthers captain-coach Doug Hewitt would kick a field goal in extra-time to give his side a 9–8 lead, which would prove enough for Panthers to claim a second consecutive premiership and its fourth overall.

Teams

Club	Home ground	Coach	Captain	President
Bathurst Panthers	Carrington Park	(Australia) Doug Hewitt	(Australia) Doug Hewitt	(Australia) Dennis Comerford
Bathurst St Patrick's	Jack Arrow Sporting Complex	(Australia) Luke Braninghan	(Australia) Luke Braninghan	(Australia) David Chapman
Blayney Bears	King George Oval	(Australia) Ben McKenna		(Australia) Tim Mooney
Cowra Magpies	Sid Kallas Oval	(Australia) Kurt Hancock		(Australia) Marc McLeish
Lithgow Workmen's Club	Tony Luchetti Showground	(Australia) Graeme Osborne		(Australia) Howard Fisher
Mudgee Dragons	Glen Willow	(Australia) Jack Littlejohn	(Australia) Jack Littlejohn	(Australia) Sebastian Flack
Oberon Tigers	Oberon Sports Ground	(Australia) Josh Starling	(Australia) Josh Starling	(Australia) Ian Christie-Johnston
Orange CYMS	Wade Park	(Australia) Dom Maley	(Australia) Dom Maley	(Australia) Dave Penny
Orange Hawks	Wade Park	(New Zealand) Willie Heta	(New Zealand) Willie Heta	

== Group 10 Premier League ladder ==
Pos	Team	Pld	W	D	L	B	PF	PA	PD	Pts	Qualification or relegation
1	Orange Hawks	16	14	0	2	2	501	254	+247	32	Group 10 Minor Premiership
2	Bathurst Panthers (C)	16	14	0	2	2	471	240	+231	32	Group 10 play-offs
3	Mudgee Dragons	15	10	1	4	2	478	217	+261	25	Group 10 play-offs
4	Lithgow Workmen's Club	16	9	0	7	2	390	352	+38	22	Group 10 play-offs
5	Cowra Magpies	16	7	1	8	2	376	308	+68	19	Group 10 play-offs
6	Orange CYMS	15	6	0	9	2	404	414	−10	16	
7	Oberon Tigers (R)	15	5	0	10	2	303	382	−79	14	Withdrew to Mid West Cup in 2020
8	Bathurst St Patrick's	16	4	0	12	2	278	508	−230	12	
9	Blayney Bears	15	0	0	15	2	200	726	−526	4	

Updated to match(es) played on unknown. Source:
Rules for classification: 1) points; 2) point difference; 3) number of points scored.

== Group 10 Premier League results ==
- Results and scorers courtesy of Group 10 Rugby League.
- Match reports courtesy of Blayney Chronicle, Central Western Daily, Cowra Guardian, Lithgow Mercury, Mudgee Guardian, Oberon Review and Western Advocate.

=== Round 1 ===
30 March	Bathurst Panthers	44–10	Blayney Bears	Bathurst
17:00	Tries: Willie Wright; Louis Murphy; Max Gay; Jed Betts; Kevin Murray; Josh Rivett; Elijah Sharwood; Goals: Willie Wright	[(Report) Report]	Tries: Lhiam Burrell; Chris Shephard; Goals: Steve Lane	Stadium: Carrington Park; Attendance: 10,973

13 April	Lithgow Workmen's Club	10–24	Orange Hawks	Lithgow
14:15	Tries: Nick Bender; Jack Sullivan; Goals: Josh Howarth	[(Report) Report]	Tries: Jordan Baker; Matt Boss; Ethan McKellar; Goals: Willie Heta	Stadium: Tony Luchetti Sportsground; Referee: B. Hotham

14 April	Mudgee Dragons	24–12	Cowra Magpies	Mudgee
13:45	Tries: Tom Lawson; Jack Beasley; Harrison Maynard; Corin Smith; Todd Munns; Goals: Jack Beasley	[(Report) Report]	Tries: Lewis Dwyer; Goals: Logan Harris	Stadium: Glen Willow; Referee: N. Blanchard

14 April	Bathurst St Patrick's	26–14	Orange CYMS	Bathurst
14:15	Tries: Chris Kirby; Traie Merritt; Garry Reilly; Adam Booth; Tim Holman; Goals: Traie Merritt	[(Report) Report]	Tries: Kane Earsman; Jarred Tyack; Lachlan Munro; Goals: Chris Grevsmuhl	Stadium: Jack Arrow Sporting Complex; Referee: N. Lander

- The Bathurst Panthers versus Blayney Bears acted as a curtain-raiser to the round three National Rugby League match between Penrith Panthers and Melbourne Storm.
- Oberon Tigers had the bye.

=== Round 2 ===
19 April	Bathurst St Patrick's	28−26	Lithgow Workmen's Club	Bathurst
13:45	Tries: Mick Latu; Mitch Squire; McCoy White; Goals: Traie Merritt	[(Report) Report]	Tries: Harry Bender Goals: Josh Howarth	Stadium: Jack Arrow Sporting Complex; Referee: B. Hotham

19 April	Cowra Magpies	14−21	Orange Hawks	Cowra
14:00	Tries: Warren Williams; Lee McClintlock; Goal: Logan Harris	[(Report) Report]	Tries: Eman Rodriguez; Jordan Baker; Goals: Duncan Young; Field goal: Matt Ross	Stadium: Sid Kallas Oval; Referee: S. Hartas

19 April	Oberon Tigers	18−24	Mudgee Dragons	Oberon
14:15	Tries: Richard Peckham; Farren Lamb; Nick Booth; Goals: Farren Lamb		Tries: Jack Beasley; Nick Willson; Jack Littlejohn; Casey Burgess; Goals: Jack Beasley	Stadium: Oberon Sports Ground; Referee: N. Lander

19 April	Blayney Bears	16−44	Orange CYMS	Blayney
14:30	Tries: Lhiam Burrell; Ryley Oborn; Robert Lane; Goals: Steve Lane	[(Report) Report]	Tries: Travis Adelerhof; Ben McAlpine; Jarred Tyack; Lachie Munro; Josh Burke; Steve Morris; Goals: Ben McAlpine	Stadium: King George Oval; Referee: C. Redding

- Orange CYMS had the bye.

=== Round 3 ===
27 April	Bathurst Panthers	22−20	Bathurst St Patrick's	Bathurst
14:00	Tries: Blake Lawson; Josh Small; Jack Siejka; Blake Seager; Goals: Willie Wright	[(Report) Report]	Tries: Jordan Naylor; Mitch Squires; Hudson White; Goals: Traie Merritt; Garry Reilly	Stadium: Carrington Park; Referee: N. Blanchard

28 April	Blayney Bears	22−66	Mudgee Dragons	Blayney
13:40				Stadium: King George Oval; Referee: B. Hotham

28 April	Oberon Tigers	22−26	Orange CYMS	Oberon
13:45		[(Report) Report]	Tries: Travis Adelerhof; Chris Grevsmuhl; Ryan Griffin; Ethan Bereyne; Goals: Ben McAlpine	Stadium: Oberon Sports Ground; Referee: C. Redding

28 April	Cowra Magpies	40−0	Lithgow Workmen's Club	Cowra
14:00	Tries: Braydn Cassidy; Warren Williams; Lewis Dwyer; Joey Bugg; John Grant; Goals: Caley Mok	[(Report) Report]		Stadium: Sid Kallas Oval; Referee: N. Lander

- Mudgee Dragons scored more than 60 points in a game for the first time since round 16, 2017, when they defeated Blayney Bears 64−0.
- Orange Hawks had the bye.

=== Round 4 ===
5 May	Blayney Bears	8−50	Cowra Magpies	Blayney
13:40	Tries: Steven Nean; Ryley Oborn		Tries: Braydn Cassidy; Mitchell Browne; Jake Pollard; Joey Bugg; Lee McClintlock; Jack Nobes Goals: Caley Mok	Stadium: King George Oval

5 May	Lithgow Workmen's Club	10−24	Oberon Tigers	Lithgow
14:00	Tries: Greg Alderson; Harry Bender; Goal: Josh Howarth		Tries: Richard Peckham; Tye Siakisoni; Josh Starling; Goals: Farren Lamb	Stadium: Tony Luchetti Sportsground

5 May	Mudgee Dragons	32−8	Orange Hawks	Mudgee
14:15	Tries: Thomas Lawson; Corin Smith; Jack Littlejohn; Aidan Woods; Goals: Thomas Lawson	[(Report) Report]	Tries: Jack Aumuller; Jordan Baker	Stadium: Glen Willow

5 May	Orange CYMS	16−46	Bathurst Panthers	Orange
14:15	Tries: Travis Adelerhof; Mitch Collins; Ben McAlpine; Goals: Ben McAlpine	[(Report) Report]	Tries: Nick Loader; Blake Seager; Willie Wright; Jack Siejka; Blake Lawson; Josh Small; Goals: Willie Wright	Stadium: Wade Park

- Bathurst St Patrick's had the bye.

=== Round 5 ===
12 May	Oberon Tigers	12−14	Orange Hawks	Oberon
14:15	Tries: Tye Siakisoni Goals: Farren Lamb		Tries: Jordan Baker; Matthew Boss; Goals: Duncan Young; Matthew Boss	Stadium: Oberon Sports Ground

12 May	Orange CYMS	22−28	Lithgow Workmen's Club	Orange
14:15	Tries: Dom Maley; Ryan Griffin; Jacob Sutherland; Goals: Ben McAlpine	[(Report) Report]	Tries: Greg Alderson; Josh Howarth; Nick Bender; Harley Osland; Eli Felton; Goals: Josh Howarth	Stadium: Wade Park

12 May	Bathurst Panthers	23−20	Mudgee Dragons	Bathurst
14:45	Tries: Kevin Murray; Josh Rivett; Willie Wright; Goals: Willie Wright; Field goal: Willie Wright	[(Report) Report]	Tries: Harrison Maynard; Corin Smith; Tim Condon; Goals: Tom Lawson	Stadium: Carrington Park

12 May	Cowra Magpies	44−14	Bathurst St Patrick's	Cowra
14:45	Tries: Braydn Cassidy; Zach Brown; Lee McClintlock; Joey Bugg; Caley Mok; Will Ingram; Goals: Caley Mok	[(Report) Report]	Tries: Mitch Squire; Jack Mackey; Bailey Waldron; Goal: Traie Merritt	Stadium: Sid Kallas Oval

- Blayney Bears had the bye.

=== Round 6 ===
18 May	Bathurst St Patrick's	10−36	Oberon Tigers	Bathurst
14:15		[(Report) Report]		Stadium: Jack Arrow Sporting Complex

18 May	Orange CYMS	22−14	Cowra Magpies	Orange
19:45	Tries: Ryan Griffin; Lachie Munro; Goals: Ben McAlpine	[(Report) Report]	Tries: Matt Naden; Zac Browne; Toby Apps; Goals: Caley Mok	Stadium: Wade Park

19 May	Lithgow Workmen's Club	40−12	Blayney Bears	Lithgow
13:45		[(Report) Report]		Stadium: Tony Luchetti Sportsground

19 May	Orange Hawks	22−14	Bathurst Panthers	Orange
14:30	Tries: Jack Aumuller; Nathan Potts; Rakai Tuheke; Duncan Young; Goals: Duncan Young	[(Report) Report]	Tries: Mackenzie Atkins; Doug Hewitt; Kevin Murray; Goal: Wille Wright	Stadium: Wade Park

- Mudgee Dragons had the bye.
- Lithgow Workies claimed back-to-back wins for the first time since round 18 in 2017.

=== Round 7 ===
26 May	Oberon Tigers	27−26	Cowra Magpies	Oberon
13:45	Tries: Matt Ranse; Josh Starling; Elias Dukes; Richie Peckham; Goals: Farren Lamb; Field goal: Farren Lamb	[(Report) Report]		Stadium: Oberon Sports Ground

26 May	Bathurst St Patrick's	6−36	Mudgee Dragons	Bathurst
14:15	Try: Chris Kirby; Goal: Adam Booth	[(Report) Report]	Tries: Chanse Burgess; Casey Burgess; Jack Littlejohn; Nick Harvey; Tom Lawson; Jared Robinson; Jayden Brown; Goals: Tom Lawson; Jack Littlejohn	Stadium: Jack Arrow Sporting Complex

26 May	Bathurst Panthers	22−20	Lithgow Workmen's Club	Bathurst
14:15	Tries: Louis Murphy; Kevin Murray; Jack Siejka; Jarred Seager; Goals: Willie Wright; Josh Rivett	[(Report) Report]	Tries: Jack Sullivan; Zac Jones; Kyle Willmott; Goals: Josh Howarth	Stadium: Carrington Park

26 May	Orange Hawks	34−22	Blayney Bears	Orange
14:30	Tries: Alex Prout; James Carr; Ethan McKellar; Willie Heta; Talon Hodge; Tries: Duncan Young	[(Report) Report]	Tries: Robert Lane; Carter Hirini; Tries: Steve Lane	Stadium: Wade Park

- Orange CYMS had the bye.

=== Round 8 ===
2 June	Blayney Bears	16−50	Oberon Tigers	Blayney
13:40	Tries: Nelson Daplin; Michael Toohey; Jade Hooper Goals: Robert Lane		Tries: Matt Ranse; Richard Peckham; Jake Dawe; Jackson Brien; Farren Lamb; Lachlan Gilmore; Elias Dukes; Goals: Farren Lamb; Ty-Lee Simmonds	Stadium: King George Oval

2 June	Cowra Magpies	12−28	Bathurst Panthers	Cowra
13:40	Tries: Lee McClintock; Jay McClintock; Goals: Coley Mok	[(Report) Report]	Tries: Jack Siejka; Kevin Murray; Josh Small; Blake Lawson; Goals:Josh Rivett	Stadium: Sid Kallas Oval

2 June	Mudgee Dragons	44−18	Orange CYMS	Mudgee
14:15	Tries: Jared Robinson; Corin Smith; Lee Hicks; Jack Littlejohn; Goals: Jack Beasley	[(Report) Report]	Tries: Ryan Griffin; Luke Petrie; Goals: Ben McAlpine	Stadium: Glen Willow

2 June	Orange Hawks	52−0	Bathurst St Patrick's	Orange
14:30	Tries: Rakai Tuheke; Ethan McKellar; Talon Hodge; Willie Heta; Jack Aumuller; Eman Rodriguez; Lawrence Fogg; Tom Blimka; Goals: Duncan Young	[(Report) Report]		Stadium: Wade Park

- Lithgow Workmen's Club had the bye.

=== Round 9 ===
7 June	Bathurst Panthers	32−12	Oberon Tigers	Bathurst
20:45	Tries: Louis Murphy; Kevin Murray; Josh Rivett; Jake Betts; Josh Small; Goals: Willie Wright	[(Report) Report]	Tries: Farren Lamb; Richard Peckham; Goals: Farren Lamb	Stadium: Carrington Park

8 June	Lithgow Workmen's Club	26−10	Mudgee Wolves	Lithgow
14:15	Tries: Jack Sullivan; Greg Behan; Nick Bender; Tui Oloapu; Goals: Josh Howarth	[(Report) Report]	Tries: Nathan Orr; Nick Harvey; Goals: Tom Lawson	Stadium: Tony Luchetti Sportsground

8 June	Bathurst St Patrick's	30−10	Blayney Bears	Bathurst
14:30	Tries: Tom Clyburn; Mitch Squire; Adam Booth; Mick Hawkins; Mick Latu; Adam Both	[(Report) Report]		Stadium: Jack Arrow Sporting Complex

9 June	Orange Hawks	30−24	Orange CYMS	Orange
14:30	Tries: Willie Heta; Ethan McKellar; Rakai Tuheke; Eman Rodriguez; Goals: Duncan Young	[(Report) Report]	Tries: Chris Grevsmuhl; Ethan Bereyne; Ryan Griffin; Goals: Ben McAlpine	Stadium: Wade Park

- Cowra Magpies had the bye.

=== Round 10 ===
22 June	Orange CYMS	62–0	Blayney Bears	Orange
15:00	Tries: Ryan Griffin; Tim Mortimer; Dom Maley; Luke Petrie; Aidan Baker; Tyrone Harrison; Travis Adelerhof; Goals: Ben McAlpine; Steve Morris	[(Report) Report]		Stadium: Wade Park

22 June	Mudgee Dragons	50–6	Oberon Tigers	Mudgee
17:30	Tries: Lee Hicks; Nathan Orr; Thomas Lawson; Corin Smith; Jared Robinson; Jack Beasley; Jack Littlejohn; Goals: Jack Beasley	[(Report) Report]	Try: Tye Siakisoni; Goal: Farren Lamb	Stadium: Glen Willow

23 June	Lithgow Workmen's Club	40–18	Bathurst St Patrick's	Lithgow
14:30		[(Report) Report]		Stadium: Tony Luchetti Sportsground

23 June	Orange Hawks	26–6	Cowra Magpies	Orange
14:30	Tries: Willie Heta; Sam Coyte; Duncan Young; Eman Rodriguez; Goals: Duncan Young	[(Report) Report]	Try: Bradyn Cassidy; Goal: Caley Mok	Stadium: Wade Park

- Bathurst Panthers had the bye.

=== Round 11 ===
29 June	Bathurst St Patrick's	24–30	Bathurst Panthers	Bathurst
14:15	Tries: Mick Latu; Aiden Kilburn; Hudson White; Chris Kirby; Goals: Traie Merritt; Adam Booth	[(Report) Report]	Tries: Blake Lawson; Kevin Murray; Willie Wright; James Higgins; Jarrod Seager; Goals: Willie Wright	Stadium: Jack Arrow Sporting Complex

29 June	Lithgow Workmen's Club	42–24	Cowra Magpies	Lithgow
14:45	Tries: Eli Felton; Brendon Van Veen; Jono Van Veen; Greg Behan; Dan Bain; Tui Oloapu; Goals: Josh Howarth	[(Report) Report]	Tries: Caley Mok; Warren Williams; Joey Bugg; Blake Tidswell; Goals: Caley Mok	Stadium: Tony Luchetti Sportsground

30 June	Mudgee Dragons	68–0	Blayney Bears	Mudgee
14:15	Tries: Jared Robinson; Lee Hicks; Nathan Orr; Corin Smith; Chanse Burgess; Ben Thompson; Tom Shearman; Todd Munn; Goals:	[(Report) Report]		Stadium: Glen Willow

30 June	Orange CYMS	52–12	Oberon Tigers	Orange
14:15	Tries: Ryan Griffin; Dom Maley; Ben McAlpine; Luke Petrie; Chris Grevsmuhl; Lachie Munro; Goals: Ben McAlpine	[(Score) Report]	Tries: Jackson Brien; Goals: Farren Lamb	Stadium: Wade Park

- Orange Hawks had the bye.

=== Round 12 ===
7 July	Oberon Tigers	6–14	Lithgow Workmen's Club	Oberon
14:15	Try: Jackson Brien; Goal: Farren Lamb		Tries: Eli Felton; Keelan Bresac; Corey Willmott	Stadium: Oberon Sports Ground

7 July	Cowra Magpies	26–12	Blayney Bears	Cowra
14:30	Tries: Zac Browne; Claude Gordon; Lee McClintock; Brydon Ramien; Goals: Caley Mok	[(Report) Report]	Tries: Robert Lane; Steve Lane; Goals: Steve Lane	Stadium: Sid Kallas Oval

7 July	Orange Hawks	32–26	Mudgee Dragons	Orange
14:30	Tries: Alex Prout; Corey Brown; Ethan McKellar; Jordan Baker; Goals: Duncan Young	[(Report) Report]	Tries: Jack Littlejohn; Chanse Burgess; Nathan Orr; Harrison Maynard; Goals: Tom Lawson; Jack Beasley	Stadium: Wade Park

7 July	Bathurst Panthers	26–20	Orange CYMS	Bathurst
14:45	Tries: Louis Murphy; Mackenzie Atkins; Josh Small; Jed Betts; Kevin Murray; Goals: Willie Wright	[(Report) Report]	Tries: Ryan Griffin; Ben McAlpine; Goals: Ben McAlpine	Stadium: Carrington Park

- Bathurst St Patrick's had the bye.

=== Round 13 ===
13 July	Bathurst St Patrick's	14–22	Cowra Magpies	Bathurst
14:15		[(Report) Report]		Stadium: Jack Arrow Sporting Complex

13 July	Lithgow Workmen's Club	54–18	Orange CYMS	Lithgow
14:45	Tries: Greg Alderson; Eli Felton; Keelan Bresac; Corey Willmott; Tui Oloapu; Goals: Josh Howarth	[(Report) Report]	Tries: Travis Alderholf; Dom Maley; Ryan Griffin; Aidan Baker; Goal: Luke Petrie	Stadium: Tony Luchetti Sportsground

14 July	Mudgee Dragons	10–14	Bathurst Panthers	Mudgee
14:15	Tries: Lee Hick; Goals: Jack Beasley	[(Report) Report]	Tries: Kevin Murray; Louis Murphy; Jack Siejka; Goal: Josh Rivett	Stadium: Glen Willow

14 July	Orange Hawks	28–24	Oberon Tigers	Orange
14:30	Tries: Lawrence Fogg; Alex Prout; Talon Hodge; Duncan Young; Goals: Duncan Young	[(Report) Report]	Tries: Jackson Brien; Matt Ranse; Elias Dukes; Jake Dawe; Goals: Farren Lamb	Stadium: Wade Park

- Blayney Bears had the bye.

=== Round 14 ===
20 July	Cowra Magpies	40–12	Orange CYMS	Cowra
13:45	Tries: Zac Browne; Will Ingram; Logan Harris; Bradyn Cassidy; Brydon Ramien; Caley Mok; Claude Gordon; Goals: Caley Mok	[(Report) Report]	Tries: Aidan Baker; Sam Warner; Goals: Luke Petrie	Stadium: Sid Kallas Oval

20 July	Bathurst Panthers	18–16	Orange Hawks	Bathurst
18:45	Tries: Jake Betts; Kevin Murray; Nick Loader; Goals: Josh Rivett	[(Report) Report]	Tries: Willie Heta; Rakai Tuheke; Alex Proutt; Goals: Duncan Young	Stadium: Carrington Park

21 July	Blayney Bears	18–48	Lithgow Workmen's Club	Blayney
13:40		[(Report) Report]		Stadium: King George Oval

21 July	Oberon Tigers	30–18	Bathurst St Patrick's	Oberon
14:30		[(Report) Report]		Stadium: Oberon Sports Ground

- Mudgee Dragons had the bye.

=== Round 15 ===
28 July	Blayney Bears	16–46	Orange Hawks	Blayney
13:40		[(Report) Report]	Tries: Jordan Baker; Lawrence Fogg; Matt Boss; Brett Morgan; Rakai Tuheke; Goals: Duncan Young	Stadium: King George Oval

28 July	Cowra Magpies	34–16	Oberon Tigers	Cowra
14:00	Tries: Lee McClintock; Blake Tidswell; Caley Mok; Zach Browne; Jeremy Gordon; Goals: Caley Mok	[(Report) Report]	Tries: Ty-Lee Simmonds; Matt Ranse; Jacob Howes; Goals: Farren Lamb	Stadium: Sid Kallas Oval

28 July	Lithgow Workmen's Club	16–6	Bathurst Panthers	Lithgow
14:15	Tries: Jack Sullivan; Cody Godden; Greg Alderson; Goals: Josh Howarth	[(Report) Report]	Try: Jack Siejka; Goal: Josh Rivett	Stadium: Tony Luchetti Sportsground

28 July	Mudgee Dragons	40–8	Bathurst St Patrick's	Mudgee
14:15	Tries: Jared Robinson; Tom Shearman; Lee Hicks; Casey Burgess; Jayden Brown; Goals: Jack Littlejohn	[(Report) Report]		Stadium: Glen Willow

- Orange CYMS had the bye.

=== Round 16 ===
3 August	Cowra Magpies	12–12	Mudgee Dragons	Cowra
14:15	Tries: Lee McClintock; Claude Gordon; Goals: Caley Mok	[(Report) Report]	Tries: Nathan Orr; Ben Thompson; Goals: Ben Thompson	Stadium: Sid Kallas Oval

3 August	Orange Hawks	64–4	Lithgow Workmen's Club	Orange
14:15	Tries: Jordan Baker; Corey Brown; Alex Prout; Lawrence Fogg; Rakai Tuheke; Matt Foliaki; Ethan Monk; Goals: Duncan Young	[(Report) Report]	Try: Matt Swift	Stadium: Wade Park

4 August	Blayney Bears	14–88	Bathurst Panthers	Blayney
13:45	Tries: Carter Hirini; Chris Shephard; Nelson Daplin; Goal: Stephen Lane	[(Report) Report]	Tries: Blake Lawson; Doug Hewitt; Louis Murphy; Jake Betts; Nick Loader; Willie Wright; Kevin Murray; Mackenzie Atkins; Josh Small; Goals: Willie Wright	Stadium: King George Oval

4 August	Orange CYMS	32–22	Bathurst St Patrick's	Orange
14:30	Tries: Ryan Griffin; Damon Goolagong; Travis Adelerhof; Goals: Luke Petrie	[(Report) Report]	Tries: Alex Knight; Garry Reilly; Chris Kirby; Goals: Traie Merritt	Stadium: Wade Park

- Oberon Tigers had the bye.

=== Round 17 ===
Cancelled	Oberon Tigers	v	Blayney Bears	Oberon
				Stadium: Oberon Sports Ground

11 August	Bathurst Panthers	30–0	Cowra Magpies	Bathurst
13:45	Tries: Josh Rivett; Brad Fearnley; Jack Siejka; Noah Griffiths; Goals: Willie Wright; Josh Rivett	[(Report) Report]		Stadium: Carrington Park

11 August	Bathurst St Patrick's	10–50	Orange Hawks	Bathurst
14:15	Tries: Chris Kirby; Goal: Garry Reilly	[(Report) Report]		Stadium: Jack Arrow Sporting Complex

Cancelled	Orange CYMS	v	Mudgee Dragons	Orange
				Stadium: Wade Park

- Lithgow Workmen's Club had the bye.
- The Oberon Tigers versus Blayney Bears and the Orange CYMS versus Mudgee Dragons were postponed after snow closed roads across the Group 10 region. With the result of the games making no difference to the competition ladder, they were not rescheduled.

=== Round 18 ===
17 August	Mudgee Dragons	16–12	Lithgow Workmen's Club	Mudgee
14:45	Tries: Harrison Maynard; Nathan Orr; Jared Robinson; Goals: Ben Thompson	[(Report) Report]	Tries: Greg Behan; Keelan Bresac; Goals: Josh Howarth; Harry Bender	Stadium: Glen Willow

18 August	Oberon Tigers	10–28	Bathurst Panthers	Oberon
13:15	Tries: Josh Starling; Ty-Lee Simmonds; Goal: Matt Ranse	[(Report) Report]	Tries: Louis Murphy; Kevin Murray; Josh Small; Mackenzie Atkins; Goals: Willie Wright	Stadium: Oberon Sports Ground

18 August	Blayney Bears	24–30	Bathurst St Patrick's	Blayney
13:45		[(Report) Report]		Stadium: King George Oval

18 August	Orange CYMS	22–34	Orange Hawks	Orange
14:30	Tries: Ryan Griffin; Joseph Ualesi; Lachlan Munro; Damon Goolagong; Goals: Luke Petrie	[(Report) Report]	Tries: Corey Brown; Duncan Young; Jared Bodrick; Emmanuel Rodriguez; Rakai Tuheke; Talon Hodge; Goals: Duncan Young	Stadium: Wade Park

- Cowra Magpies had the bye.

== Group 10 Premier League finals series ==
Qualifying Finals
2	Bathurst Panthers	40
3	Mudgee Dragons	18
4	Lithgow Workmen's Club	24
5	Cowra Magpies	22

Semi-finals
1	Orange Hawks	16
2	Bathurst Panthers	36
3	Mudgee Dragons	36
4	Lithgow Workmen's Club	30

Preliminary Finals
1	Orange Hawks	0
3	Mudgee Dragons	14

Grand Final
2	Bathurst Panthers	9
3	Mudgee Dragons	8

=== Elimination final/Qualifying final ===
24 August	Bathurst Panthers	40–18	Mudgee Dragons	Bathurst
18:00	Tries: Blake Lawson; Jack Siejka; Josh Rivett; Mackenzie Atkins; Willie Wright; Louis Murphy; Goals: Willie Wright	[(Report) Report]	Tries: Todd Munn; Harrison Maynard; Corin Smith; Chanse Burgess; Goal: Ben Thompson	Stadium: Carrington Park

25 August	Lithgow Workmen's Club	24–22	Cowra Magpies	Lithgow
15:00	Tries: Josh Howarth; Daniel Bain; Nick Miller; Kyle Willmott; Goals: Josh Howarth	[(Report) Report]	Tries: Will Ingram; Blake Tidswell; Joey Bugg; Lee McClintock; Goals: Caley Mok	Stadium: Tony Luchetti Showground

=== Semi-finals ===
31 August	Orange Hawks	16–36	Bathurst Panthers	Orange
15:00	Tries: Alex Prout; Jared Brodrick; Jack Aumuller; Goals: Duncan Young	[(Report) Report]	Tries: Willie Wright; Blake Lawson; Doug Hewitt; Nick Loader; Mackenzie Atkins; Jack Siejka; Goals: Willie Wright	Stadium: Wade Park

1 September	Mudgee Dragons	36–30	Lithgow Workmen's Club	Mudgee
14:45	Tries: Jared Robinson; Lee Hicks; Jayden Brown; Jack Beasley; Goals: Harrison Maynard; Jack Beasley	[(Report) Report]		Stadium: Glen Willow

=== Preliminary final ===
8 September	Orange Hawks	0–14	Mudgee Dragons	Orange
14:00		[(Report) Report]	Tries: Lee Hicks; Harry Maynard; Goals: Jack Beasley	Stadium: Wade Park

=== Grand final ===
15 September	Bathurst Panthers	9–8 (a.e.t.)	Mudgee Dragons	Bathurst
15:00	Try: Jack Siejka; Goals: Willie Wright; Field goal: Doug Hewitt	[(Report) Report]	Tries: Nathan Orr; Jack Beasley	Stadium: Carrington Park

==== Grand final report ====
Bathurst Panthers	Position	Mudgee Dragons
Josh Rivett	FB	Jayden Brown
Mackenzie Atkins	WG	Jared Robinson
Blake Lawson	CE	Nathan Orr
Kevin Murray	CE	Lee Hicks
Louis Murphy	WG	Harrison Maynard
Willie Wright	FE	Jack Littlejohn (c)
Doug Hewitt (c)	HB	Tim Condon
Brent Seager	PR	Tom Shearman
Nick Loader	HK	Ben Thompson
Jason Corliss	PR	Hamish Bryant
Jack Siejka	SR	Chanse Burgess
Blake Seager	SR	Todd Munn
Jake Betts	LK	Casey Burgess
Jed Betts	Bench	Luke Moody
James Higgins	Bench	Sebastian Flack
Josh Small	Bench	Aiden Woods
Brad Fearnley	Bench	Jack Beasley
Doug Hewitt	Coach	Jack Littlejohn

Bathurst Panthers hosted the Group 10 Rugby League grand final day for the first time since 2007. Mudgee Dragons had won all their grand finals against Panthers (in 2000 and 2004) at Carrington Park.

The match was a low-scoring affair and it wasn't until the Dragons gave away two straight penalties that Panthers broke the deadlock with a penalty goal from the boot of Willie Wright in the 18th minute to give the Bathurst side a 2–nil lead.

Neither team could build momentum as both sides continued to shoot themselves in the foot through handling errors or discipline issues, but the Dragons crowd came to life with two minutes remaining in the half, voicing their approval of a huge break down the middle from Ben Thompson. Nathan Orr made the most of the chance close to the line, fending off an opponent before planting down the ball for the only try of the opening half. Mudgee lead 4–2 at half-time.

After play resumed for the second-half, Panthers looked to their left wing for a response eight minutes into the new half, however, Louis Murphy was denied on the try line by desperate Dragons defence.

Another Orr fend gave the Dragons centre a chance to score in the 57th minute but a strong tackle from Josh Rivett put him into touch.

However, Jack Beasley wasn't going to be denied five minutes later and the Mudgee substitute crashed over to give the Dragons a 8–2 lead.

It was on the 67th minute mark that the Panthers found their opening try of the match as second rower Jack Siejka scored between the uprights.

Wright's conversion brought the score level at 8–all and with no team finding the winning points in the remaining minutes, the match went to extra-time, the first grand final to require extra-time since 2006.

Extra-time would be five minutes each way and in their first chance to break the deadlock, captain-coach Doug Hewitt slotted home a field goal.

The Panthers held on to win their second consecutive Group 10 Rugby League Premier League title.

Bathurst Panthers 9 (Jack Siejka try; Willie Wright 2 goals, Doug Hewitt field goal)

Mudgee Dragons 8 (Nathan Orr, Jack Beasley tries)
