= George Evans (rugby league) =

Australian rugby league footballer

Personal information
- Full name: George Kenneth Evans
- Born: 28 January 1941; Sydney, New South Wales, Australia
- Died: 25 December 2015 (aged 74); Corrimal, New South Wales, Australia

Playing information
- Position: Halfback
Club
Years	Team	Pld	T	G	FG	P
1962–68	St. George	68	11	0	0	33
- Source: Whiticker/Hudson.

George Evans (28 January 1941 – 25 December 2015) was an Australian rugby league footballer who played in the 1960s. He won four consecutive premierships with the St. George Dragons in New South Wales Rugby League competition.

== Career ==
George Evans joined St. George in 1961 after playing in local rugby union teams as a younger man. He became the first grade half-back at the St. George club when Bob Bugden joined Parramatta in 1962. He retained his position and went on to win four premierships with St. George in 1962, 1963, 1964 and 1965. He lost his permanent position in the first grade line up when Billy Smith became the starting half-back in 1966. He stayed at the club until 1968 before retiring to captain-coach the Corrimal club.

George Evans died at Corrimal, New South Wales on 25 December 2015, 34 days short of his 75th birthday.

In an opinion piece posted on 20 July 2022 in The Sydney Morning Herald by former Saints coach Roy Masters, George Evans is considered to be one of the top 100 greatest St. George players.
