= Arch Brown =

Australian rugby league footballer

Personal information
- Full name: Archibald William Brown
- Born: 9 July 1944 Goomeri, Queensland, Australia
- Died: 4 October 2018 (aged 74) Queensland, Australia

Playing information
- Position: Wing
Club
Years	Team	Pld	T	G	FG	P
1965–69	Parramatta Eels	72	24	194	0	460
Representative
Years	Team	Pld	T	G	FG	P
1964	Queensland	5	1	12	0	27

Archibald William Brown (9 July 1944 – 4 October 2018) was an Australian rugby league footballer.

Born in Goomeri, Queensland, Brown was a tall and speedy winger who started his career with West Brisbane. He represented Brisbane in the 1964 Bulimba Cup and was the only outside back to represent Queensland in all fixtures that season. After some difficulty, Parramatta subsequently secured a clearance for Brown to join the club in 1965.

Brown, a reliable goal–kicker, began at Parramatta by scoring a club record 131 points in the 1965 NSWRFL season. The following year, Brown received injuries in a car accident, which claimed the life of his baby daughter, and made limited appearances. He remained with Parramatta for a further three seasons and finished with a record 460 points for the Eels (later surpassed by Mick Cronin). During his rugby league career, Brown stayed fit in the off season competing in professional sprinting events.
