= 1965 NSWRFL season =

Rugby league competition

1965 New South Wales Rugby Football League
- Teams: 10
- Premiers: St. George (12th title)
- Minor premiers: St. George (11th title)
- Matches played: 94
- Points scored: 2,485
- Total attendance: 1,171,510
- Top points scorer: Fred Griffiths (181)
- Wooden spoon: Eastern Suburbs (3rd spoon)
- Top try-scorer: Johnny King (15)

The 1965 New South Wales Rugby Football League premiership was the 58th season of the rugby league competition based in Sydney. Ten clubs from across the city competed for the J.J. Giltinan Shield and the WD & HO Wills Cup during the season, which culminated in a grand final between St. George and South Sydney.

The 1965 season also saw the retirement from the League of future Australian Rugby League Hall of Fame inductee, Norm Provan.

== Teams ==
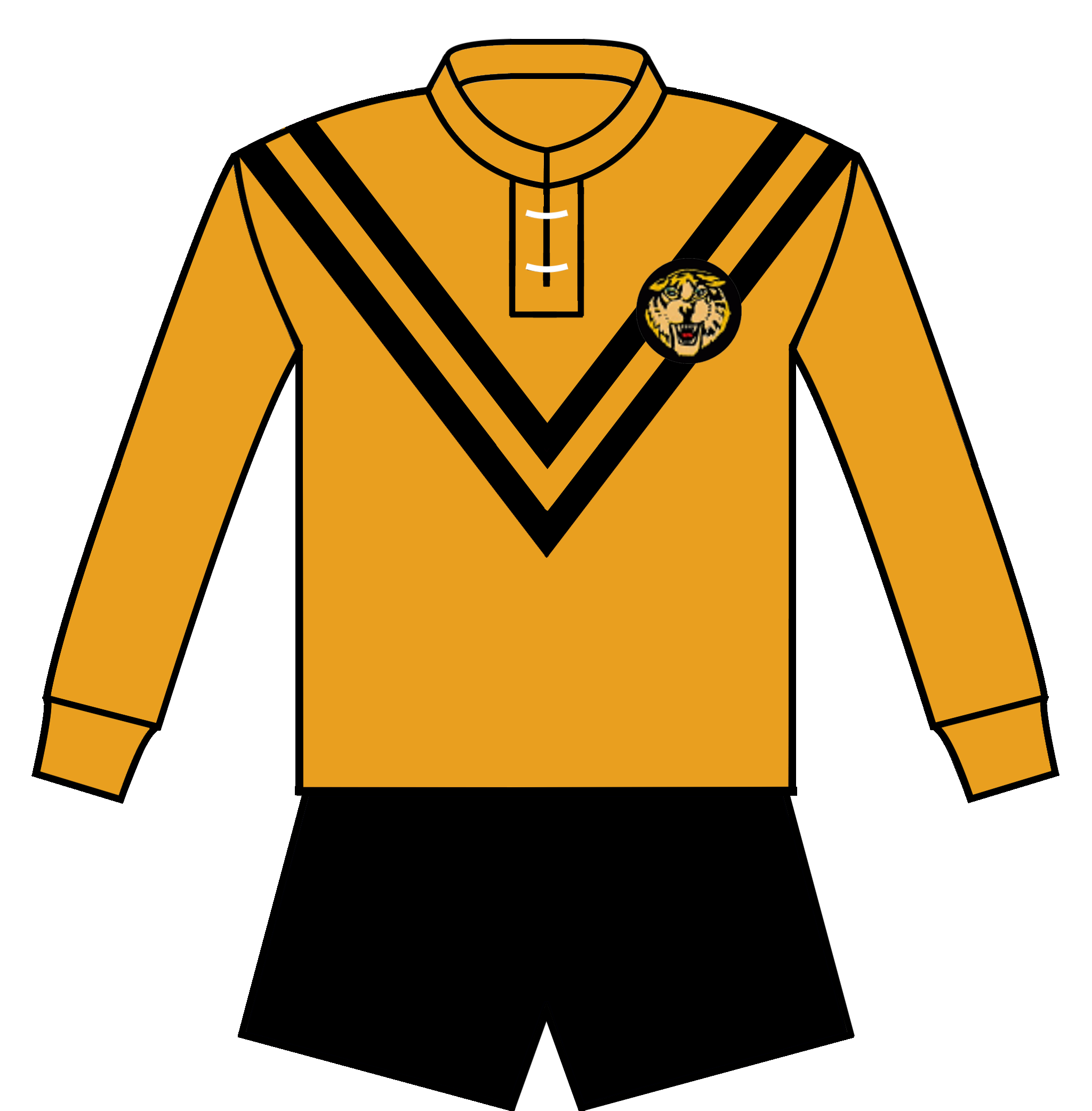
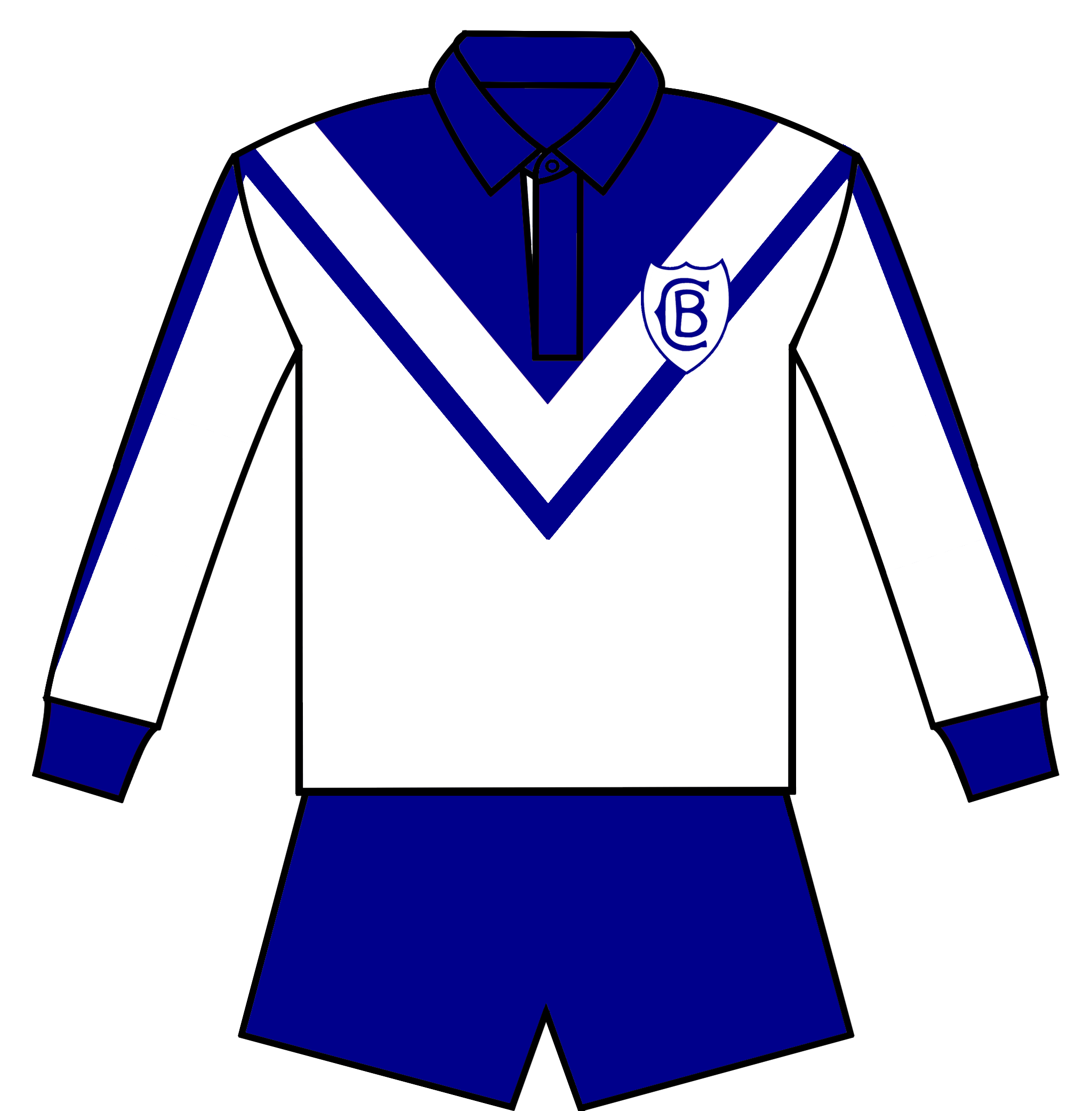
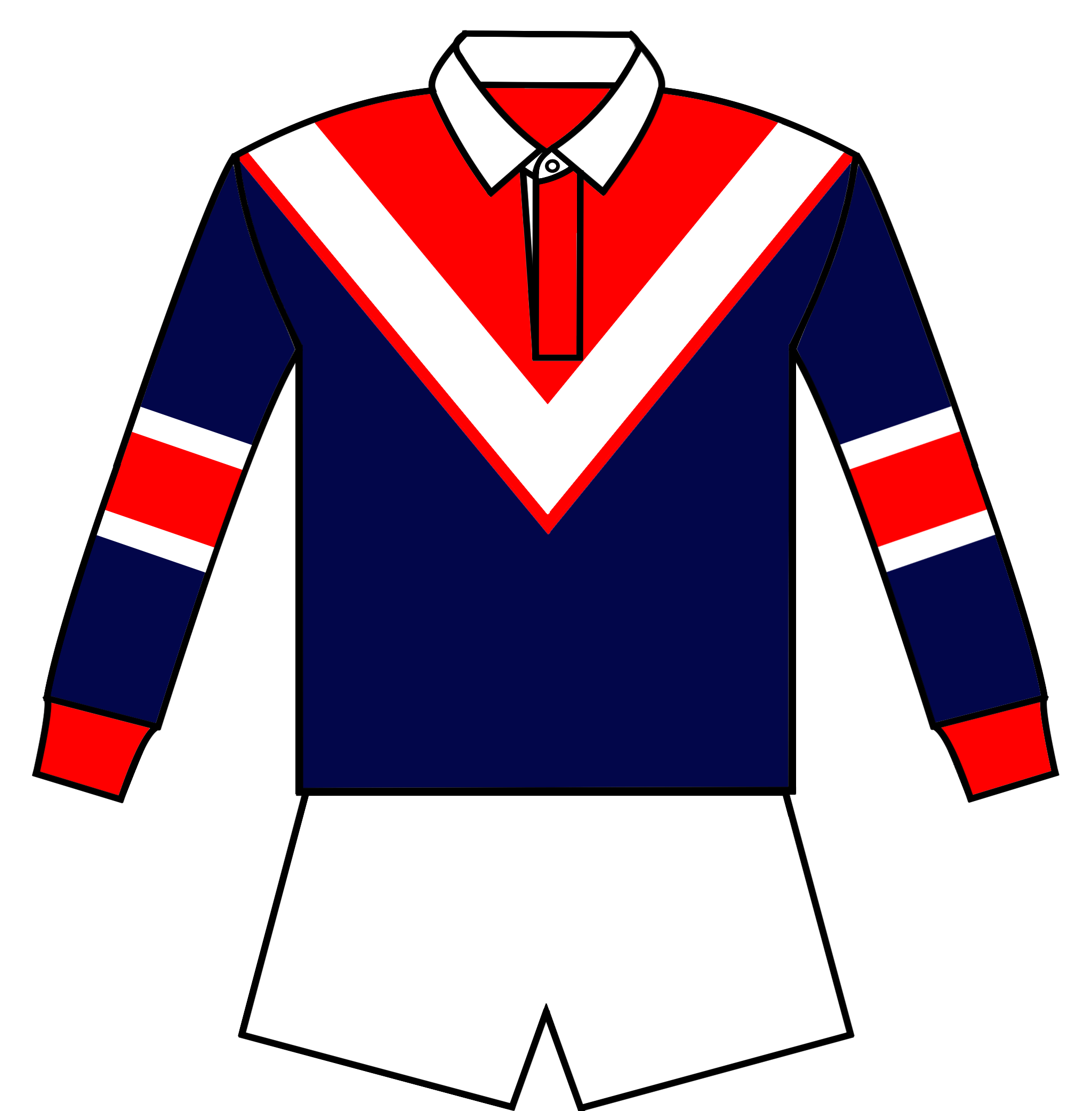
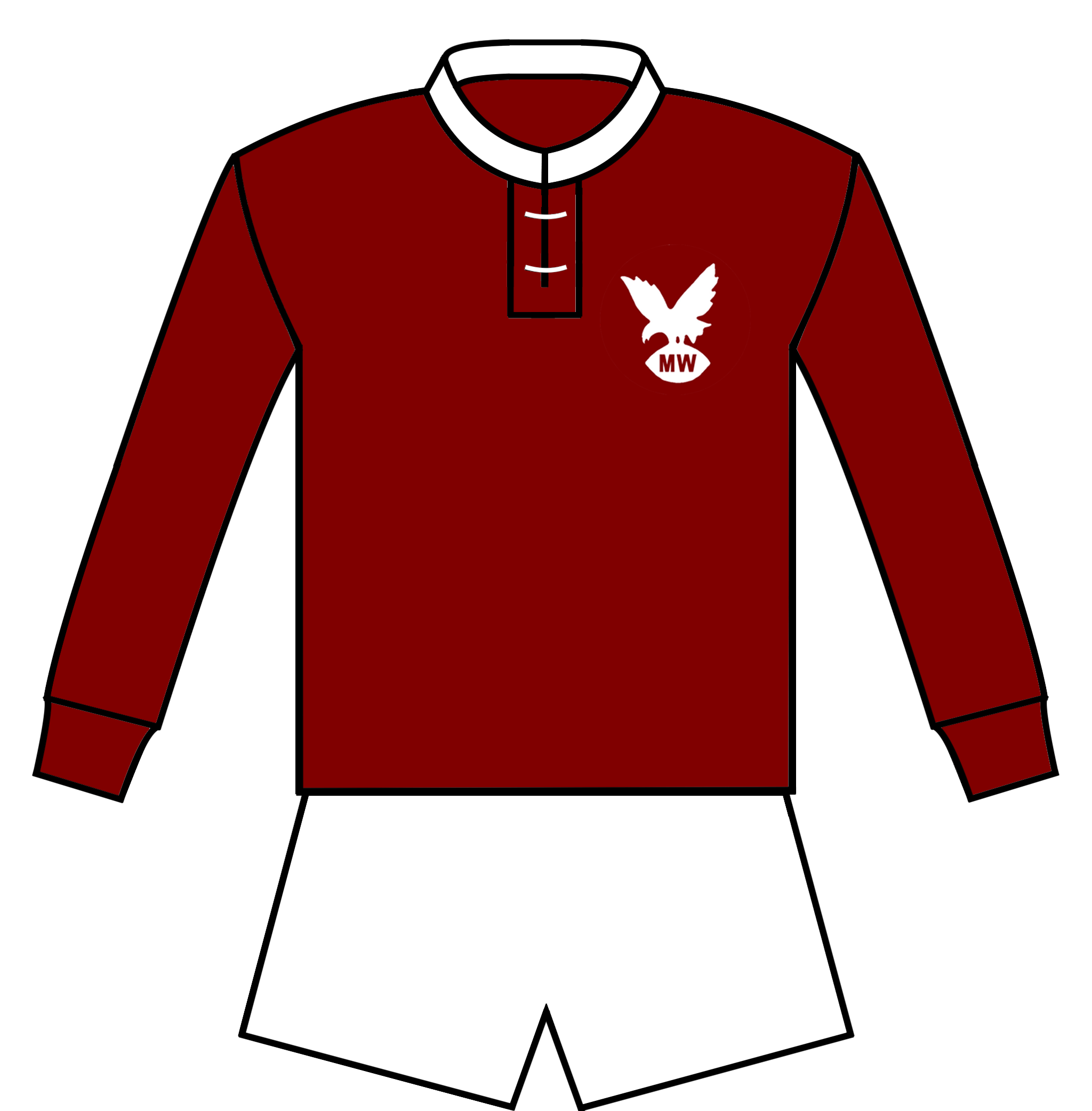
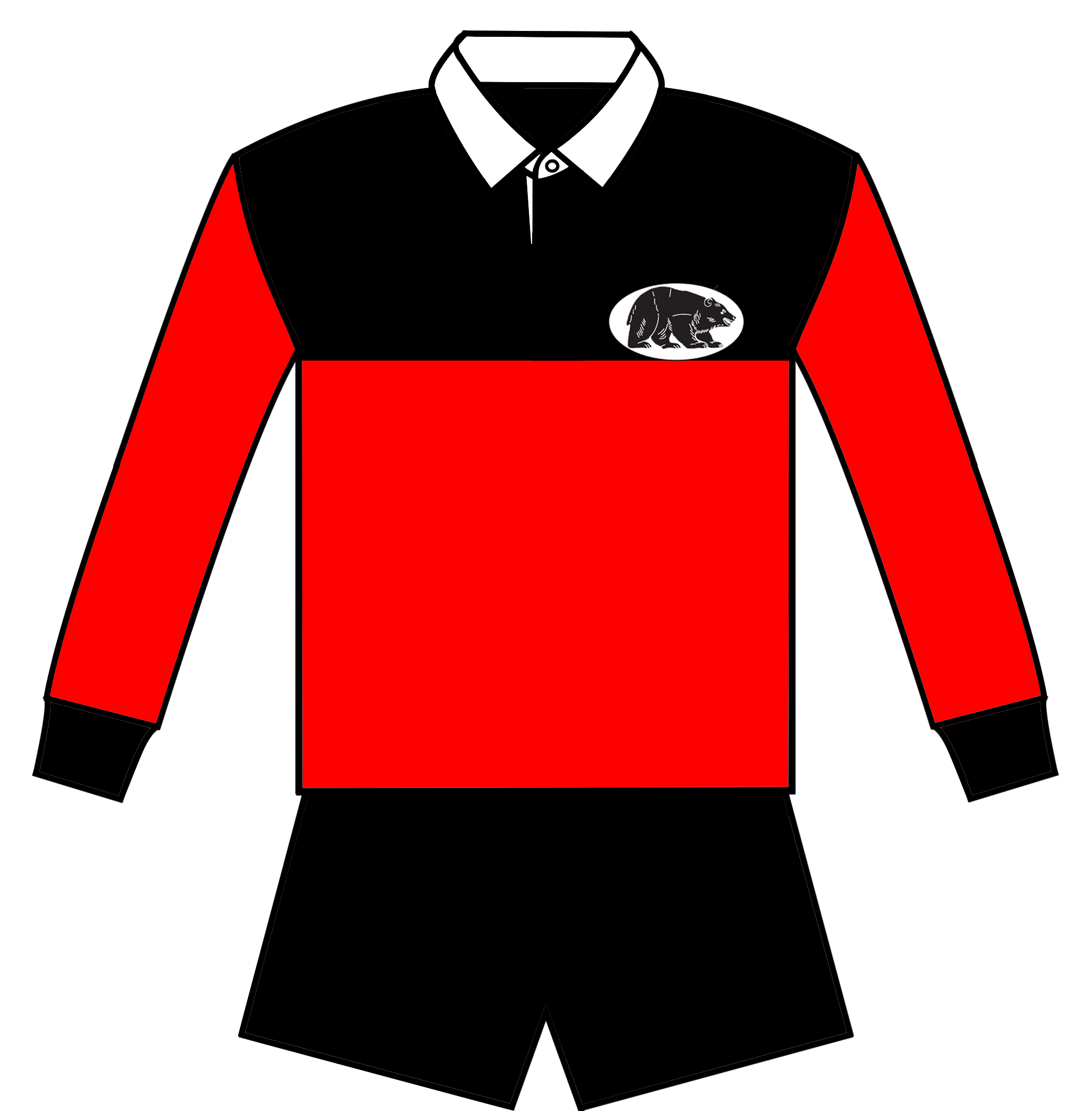
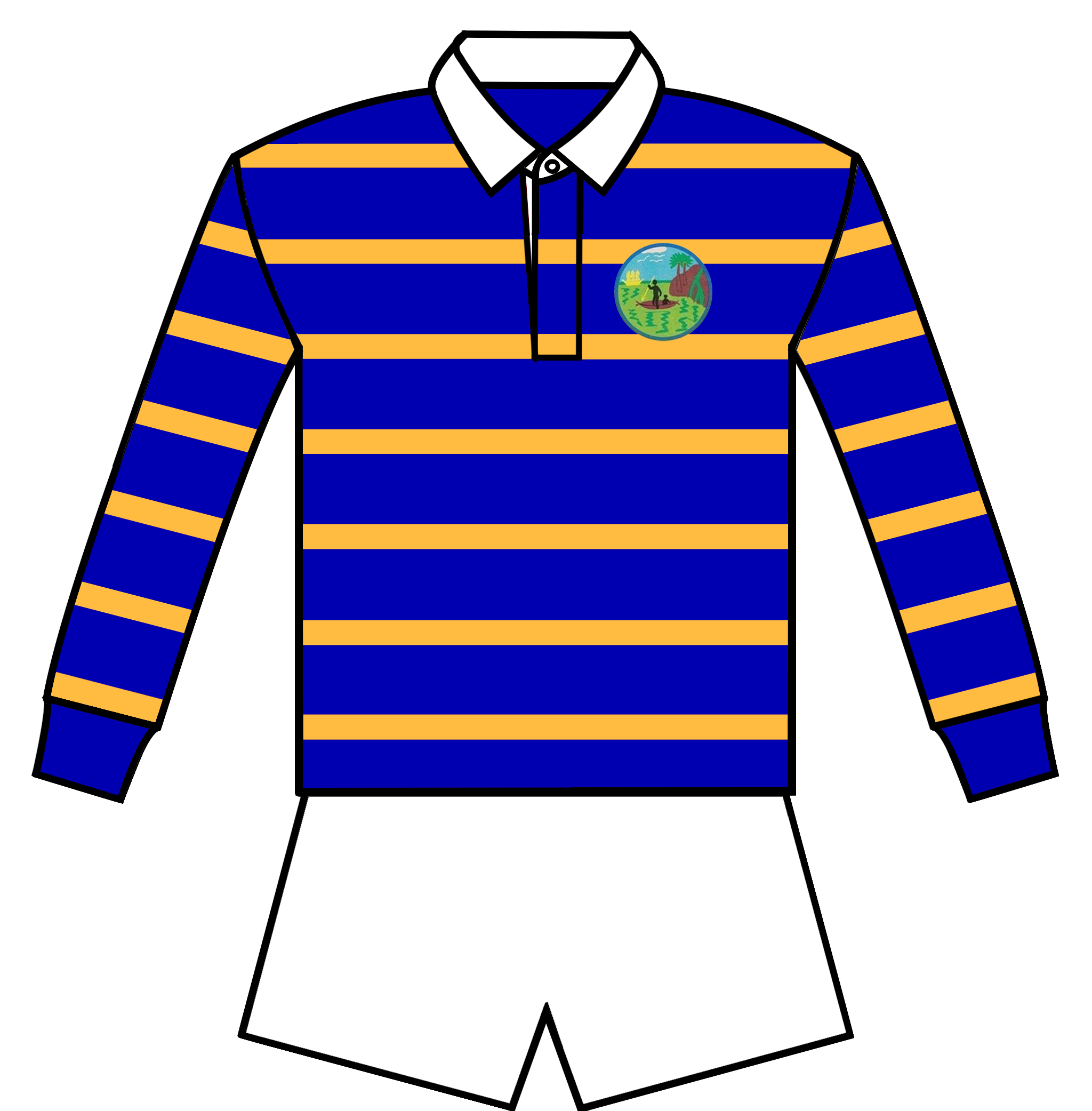
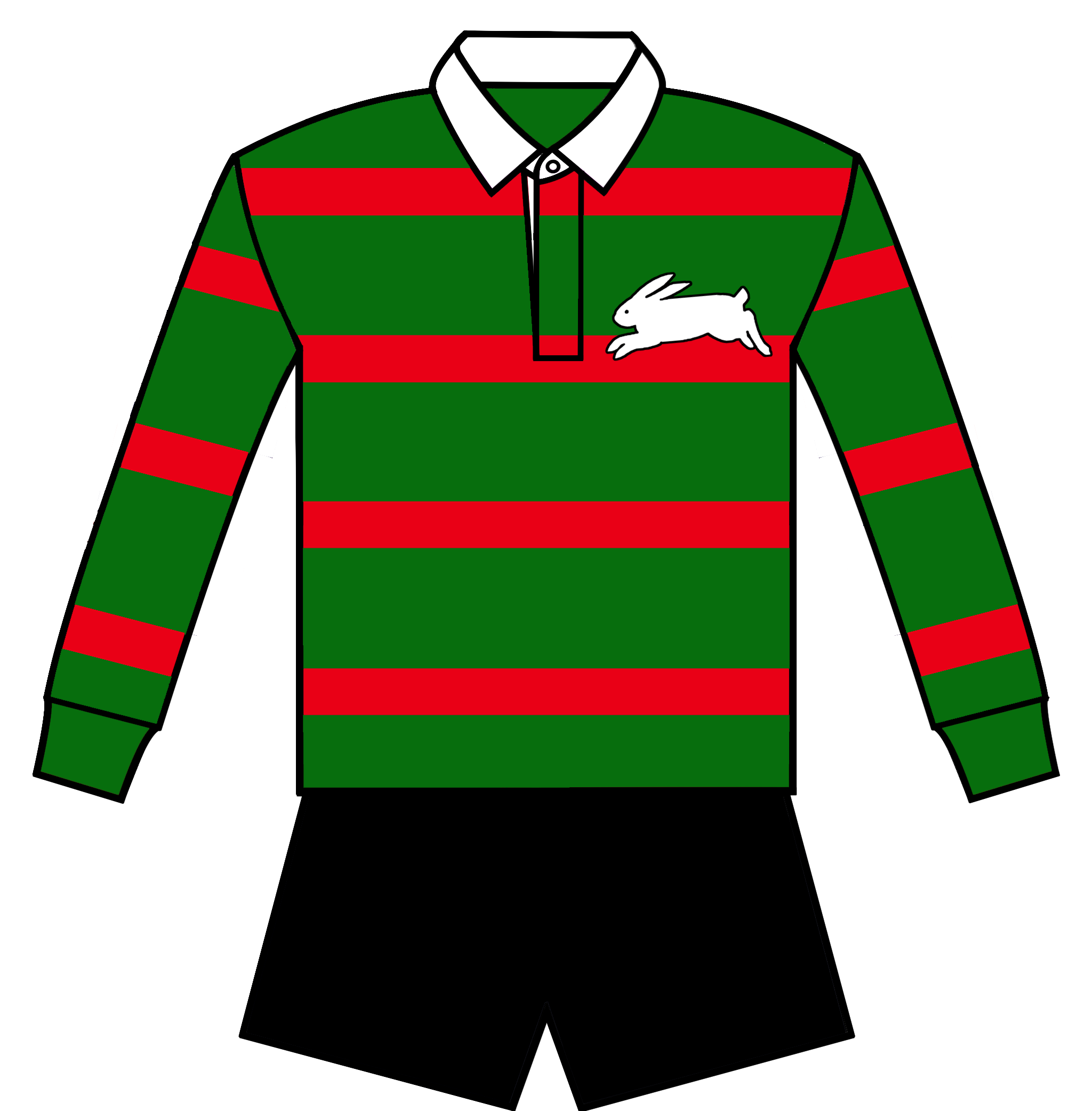
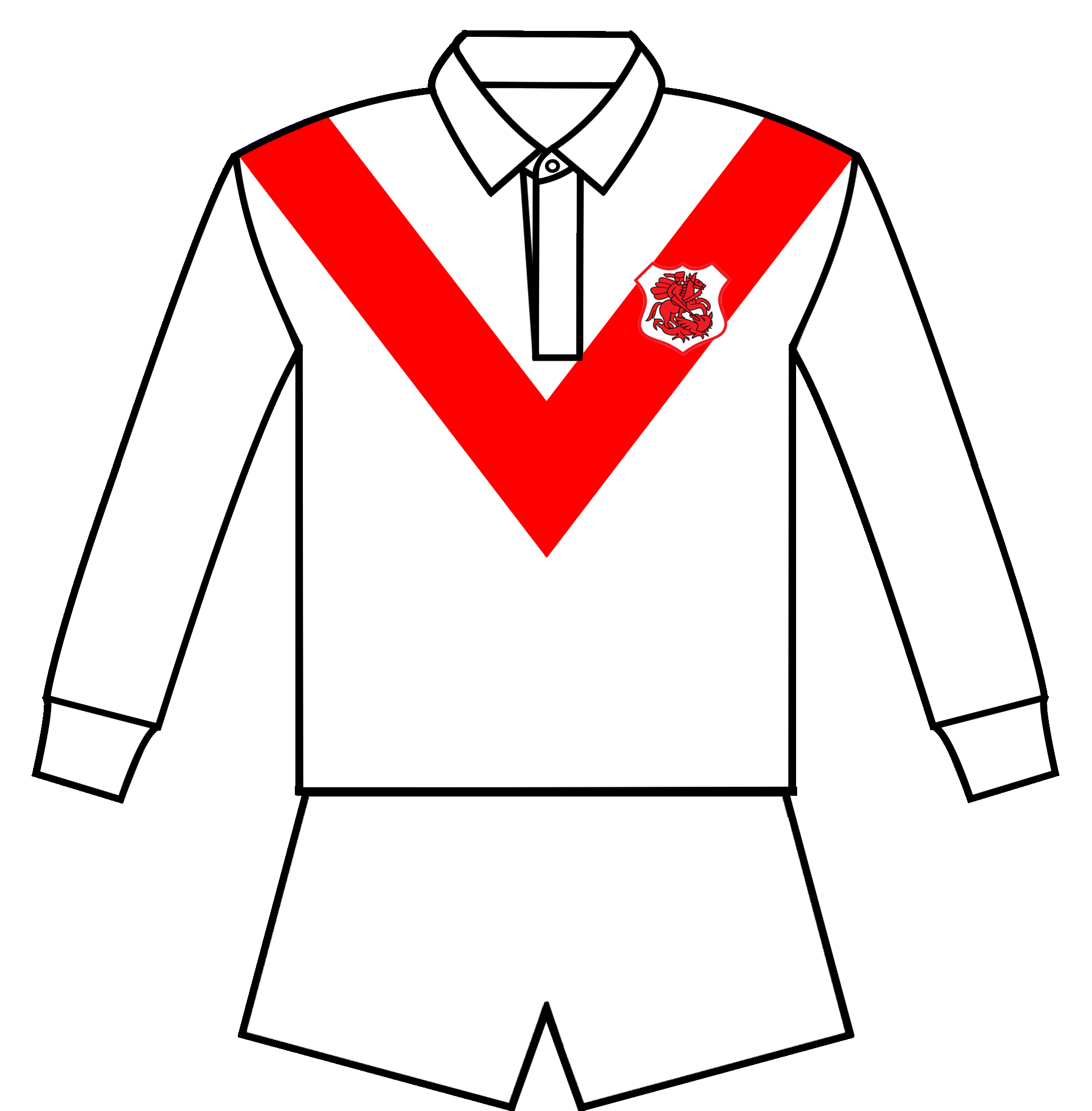
| Balmain 58th season Ground: Leichhardt Oval; Coach: Harry Bath; Captain: Keith Barnes | Canterbury-Bankstown 31st season Ground: Belmore Oval; Coach: Eddie Burns; Captain: Leo Toohey | Eastern Suburbs 58th season Ground: Sydney Sports Ground; Coach: Bert Holcroft; Captain: Frank Drake | Manly-Warringah 19th season Ground: Brookvale Oval; Coach: Russell Pepperell; Captain: Frank Stanton | Newtown 58th season Ground: Henson Park; Coach: Allan Ellis; Captain: Brian Graham |
| North Sydney 58th season Ground: North Sydney Oval; Captain-Coach: Fred Griffiths | Parramatta 19th season Ground: Cumberland Oval; Captain-coach: Ken Thornett | South Sydney 58th season Ground: Redfern Oval; Coach: Bernie Purcell; Captain: Jim Lisle | St. George 45th season Ground: Jubilee Oval; Captain-coach: Norm Provan | Western Suburbs 58th season Ground: Pratten Park; Coach: Ken Kearney; Captain: Bob McGuinness |

== Regular season ==
| Team | 1 | 2 | 3 | 4 | 5 | 6 | 7 | 8 | 9 | 10 | 11 | 12 | 13 | 14 | 15 | 16 | 17 | 18 | 19 | F1 | F2 | F3 | GF |
|---|---|---|---|---|---|---|---|---|---|---|---|---|---|---|---|---|---|---|---|---|---|---|---|
| Balmain | NOR; 0 | **EAS** **+15** | **NEW** **−11** | WES +3 | CBY +5 | MAN +2 | **STG** **−2** | **PAR** **−5** | SOU +13 | **NOR** **+9** | EAS +7 | X | NEW −8 | **WES** **−2** | **CBY** **+17** | **MAN** **+13** | **STG** **−41** | PAR −9 | **SOU** **+6** | | | | |
| Canterbury-Bankstown | **SOU** **+10** | WES +3 | **EAS** **+16** | MAN +1 | **BAL** **−5** | PAR −8 | **NEW** **−15** | NOR −10 | **STG** **−6** | X | **WES** **+1** | SOU −10 | EAS −2 | **MAN** **−20** | BAL −17 | **PAR** **−6** | NEW −8 | **NOR** **−17** | STG −44 | | | | |
| Eastern Suburbs | **MAN** **−21** | BAL −15 | CBY −16 | **NEW** **−6** | **NOR** **−22** | STG −37 | SOU −17 | **WES** **+7** | PAR −24 | X | **BAL** **−7** | MAN +10 | **CBY** **+2** | NEW; 0 | NOR −2 | **STG** **−20** | **SOU** **−14** | WES −8 | **PAR** **−14** | | | | |
| Manly-Warringah | EAS +21 | SOU +13 | NOR −21 | **CBY** **−1** | STG −2 | **BAL** **−2** | **PAR** **−8** | NEW −6 | WES −1 | X | **SOU** **+3** | **EAS** **−10** | NOR −8 | CBY +20 | **STG** **−9** | BAL −13 | PAR −4 | **NEW** **+9** | **WES** **+12** | | | | |
| Newtown | PAR; 0 | **STG** **−11** | BAL +11 | EAS +6 | **SOU** **−2** | **WES** **−8** | CBY +15 | **MAN** **+6** | **NOR** **+4** | **PAR** **−1** | STG −31 | X | **BAL** **+8** | **EAS**; **0** | SOU −4 | WES +10 | **CBY** **+8** | MAN −9 | NOR; 0 | | | | |
| North Sydney | **BAL**; **0** | PAR +23 | **MAN** **+21** | **STG** **+3** | EAS +22 | SOU −2 | **WES** **+1** | **CBY** **+10** | NEW −4 | BAL −9 | **PAR** **−1** | X | **MAN** **+8** | **STG** **−12** | **EAS** **+2** | **SOU** **+9** | WES +12 | CBY +17 | **NEW**; **0** | X | STG −40 | **SOU** **−5** | |
| Parramatta | **NEW**; **0** | **NOR** **−23** | STG −19 | **SOU** **−9** | WES −10 | **CBY** **+8** | MAN +8 | BAL +5 | **EAS** **+24** | NEW +1 | NOR +1 | X | STG −8 | SOU −2 | **WES** **+14** | CBY +6 | **MAN** **+4** | **BAL** **+9** | EAS +14 | **SOU** **−15** | | | |
| South Sydney | CBY −10 | **MAN** **−13** | **WES** **+4** | PAR +9 | NEW +2 | **NOR** **+2** | **EAS** **+17** | **STG** **+10** | **BAL** **−13** | X | MAN −3 | **CBY** **+10** | WES −7 | **PAR** **+2** | **NEW** **+4** | NOR −9 | EAS +14 | **STG** **+9** | BAL −6 | PAR +15 | X | NOR +5 | STG −4 |
| St. George | WES +4 | NEW +11 | **PAR** **+19** | NOR −3 | **MAN** **+2** | **EAS** **+37** | BAL +2 | SOU −10 | CBY +6 | X | **NEW** **+31** | **WES** **+28** | **PAR** **+8** | NOR +12 | MAN +9 | EAS +20 | BAL +41 | SOU −9 | **CBY** **+44** | X | **NOR** **+40** | X | **SOU** **+4** |
| Western Suburbs | **STG** **−4** | **CBY** **−3** | SOU −4 | **BAL** **−3** | **PAR** **+10** | NEW +8 | NOR −1 | EAS −7 | **MAN** **+1** | X | CBY −1 | STG −28 | **SOU** **+7** | BAL +2 | PAR −14 | **NEW** **−10** | **NOR** **−12** | **EAS** **+8** | MAN −12 | | | | |
| Team | 1 | 2 | 3 | 4 | 5 | 6 | 7 | 8 | 9 | 10 | 11 | 12 | 13 | 14 | 15 | 16 | 17 | 18 | 19 | F1 | F2 | F3 | GF |

Bold – Home game
X – Bye
Opponent for round listed above margin

== Ladder ==
| | Team | Pld | W | D | L | PF | PA | PD | Pts |
|---|---|---|---|---|---|---|---|---|---|
| 1 | St. George | 18 | 15 | 0 | 3 | 394 | 142 | +252 | 30 |
| 2 | North Sydney | 18 | 11 | 2 | 5 | 318 | 218 | +100 | 24 |
| 3 | Parramatta | 18 | 11 | 1 | 6 | 243 | 220 | +23 | 23 |
| 4 | South Sydney | 18 | 11 | 0 | 7 | 227 | 205 | +22 | 22 |
| 5 | Balmain | 18 | 10 | 1 | 7 | 223 | 211 | +12 | 21 |
| 6 | Newtown | 18 | 8 | 3 | 7 | 212 | 210 | +2 | 19 |
| 7 | Manly | 18 | 6 | 0 | 12 | 228 | 235 | -7 | 12 |
| 8 | Western Suburbs | 18 | 6 | 0 | 12 | 181 | 244 | -63 | 12 |
| 9 | Canterbury | 18 | 5 | 0 | 13 | 194 | 331 | -137 | 10 |
| 10 | Eastern Suburbs | 18 | 3 | 1 | 14 | 149 | 353 | -204 | 7 |

=== Ladder progression ===
- Numbers highlighted in green indicate that the team finished the round inside the top 4.
- Numbers highlighted in blue indicates the team finished first on the ladder in that round.
- Numbers highlighted in red indicates the team finished last place on the ladder in that round.

| | Team | 1 | 2 | 3 | 4 | 5 | 6 | 7 | 8 | 9 | 10 | 11 | 12 | 13 | 14 | 15 | 16 | 17 | 18 | 19 |
|---|---|---|---|---|---|---|---|---|---|---|---|---|---|---|---|---|---|---|---|---|
| 1 | St. George | 2 | 4 | 6 | 6 | 8 | 10 | 12 | 12 | 14 | 14 | 16 | 18 | 20 | 22 | 24 | 26 | 28 | 28 | 30 |
| 2 | North Sydney | 1 | 3 | 5 | 7 | 9 | 9 | 11 | 13 | 13 | 13 | 13 | 13 | 15 | 15 | 17 | 19 | 21 | 23 | 24 |
| 3 | Parramatta | 1 | 1 | 1 | 1 | 1 | 3 | 5 | 7 | 9 | 11 | 13 | 13 | 13 | 13 | 15 | 17 | 19 | 21 | 23 |
| 4 | South Sydney | 0 | 0 | 2 | 4 | 6 | 8 | 10 | 12 | 12 | 12 | 12 | 14 | 14 | 16 | 18 | 18 | 20 | 22 | 22 |
| 5 | Balmain | 1 | 3 | 3 | 5 | 7 | 9 | 9 | 9 | 11 | 13 | 15 | 15 | 15 | 15 | 17 | 19 | 19 | 19 | 21 |
| 6 | Newtown | 1 | 1 | 3 | 5 | 5 | 5 | 7 | 9 | 11 | 11 | 11 | 11 | 13 | 14 | 14 | 16 | 18 | 18 | 19 |
| 7 | Manly-Warringah | 2 | 4 | 4 | 4 | 4 | 4 | 4 | 4 | 4 | 4 | 6 | 6 | 6 | 8 | 8 | 8 | 8 | 10 | 12 |
| 8 | Western Suburbs | 0 | 0 | 0 | 0 | 2 | 4 | 4 | 4 | 6 | 6 | 6 | 6 | 8 | 10 | 10 | 10 | 10 | 12 | 12 |
| 9 | Canterbury-Bankstown | 2 | 4 | 6 | 8 | 8 | 8 | 8 | 8 | 8 | 8 | 10 | 10 | 10 | 10 | 10 | 10 | 10 | 10 | 10 |
| 10 | Eastern Suburbs | 0 | 0 | 0 | 0 | 0 | 0 | 0 | 2 | 2 | 2 | 2 | 4 | 6 | 7 | 7 | 7 | 7 | 7 | 7 |

== Finals ==
| Home | Score | Away | Match Information |
| Home | Score | Away | Date and Time | Venue | Referee | Crowd |
|---|---|---|---|---|---|---|
Semi-finals
| Parramatta | 2–17 | South Sydney Rabbitohs | 28 August 1965 | Sydney Cricket Ground | Col Pearce | 54,626 |
| St. George Dragons | 47–7 | North Sydney Bears | 4 September 1965 | Sydney Cricket Ground | Col Pearce | 38,944 |
Preliminary Final
| North Sydney Bears | 9–14 | South Sydney Rabbitohs | 11 September 1965 | Sydney Cricket Ground | Col Pearce | 36,695 |
Grand Final
| St. George Dragons | 12–8 | South Sydney Rabbitohs | 18 September 1965 | Sydney Cricket Ground | Col Pearce | 78,056 |

=== Grand Final ===
| St. George Dragons | Position | South Sydney Rabbitohs |
|---|---|---|
| 1. Graeme Langlands | FB | 1. Kevin Longbottom |
| 2. Eddie Lumsden | WG | 2. Eric Simms |
| 3. Reg Gasnier | CE | 3. Arthur Branighan |
| 4. Billy Smith | CE | 4. Bob Moses |
| 5. Johnny King | WG | 5. Michael Cleary |
| 6. Brian Clay | FE | 6. Jim Lisle (c) |
| 7. George Evans | HB | 7. Ivan Jones |
| 13 Robin Gourley | PR | 13. Jim Morgan |
| 12. Ian Walsh | HK | 12. Fred Anderson |
| 11. Kevin Ryan | PR | 11. John O'Neill |
| 10. Elton Rasmussen | SR | 10. Bob McCarthy |
| 9. Norm Provan (Ca./Co.) | SR | 9. John Sattler |
| 8. Johnny Raper | LK | 8. Ron Coote |
| | Coach | Bernie Purcell |

In 1965, the Sydney Cricket Ground could accommodate 70,000. With capacity already reached two hours before kick-off the SCG staff closed the gates and posted an attendance figure of just over 78,000, a ground record that still stands as of 2016 and with changes to the venue in the years since resulting in a decreased capacity of 48,000 is unlikely to be broken. Meanwhile, the surrounding streets and parklands were packed with an estimated 40,000 people who were still trying to get into a ground. Hundreds chose to break in by storming the Members gates and proceeded to climb the grandstands, perching themselves on the roofs. Scores more bought tickets to the Motor Show which was being held next door in the Royal Showground. From here they took up vantage points on the Showground Pavilions with good views of the SCG pitch. After consultation the police allowed thousands to sit on the ground itself, covering the outer ring of the oval.

At 3pm, St George captain-coach Norm Provan, the last player from the Dragons' 1956 premiership-winning side, led his team onto the field in what would be his final match before retiring. Souths had already beaten Saints twice in 1965 and the huge crowd that attended were either looking to see the milestone 10th successive win or to see the dominant run halted. The St George team, with an average age of 27, faced a real threat from their younger South Sydney rivals whose average age was 22.

Rabbitohs fullback, Kevin Longbottom opened the scoring with a 55-yard penalty goal in the 20th minute – the kick receiving applause from St. George fullback Graeme Langlands. St George replied with a Billy Smith try. Langlands and Longbottom exchanged penalty goals with both players booting the ball more than 50 yards. It was a tough encounter with fiery forward charges from Provan, Johnny Raper and Kevin Ryan. The scrums in particular were no place for the faint-hearted, and Ryan was being unsettled by the Souths' front row of Jim Morgan and John O'Neill. In one scrum, after seeing Rabbitohs hooker Fred Anderson reaching into the tunnel, Ryan stood on Anderson, raked him back and proceeded to walk over him. The Dragons pack surged forward, forcing Anderson along the ground through the St George second row and out the back of the scrum. The 'keelhauled' Anderson sat dazed and bleeding on the ground with the ball still in hand.

The second half began with more penalty goals to Langlands and Longbottom. Souths' lock Ron Coote kept his side in the match with two brilliant try-saving tackles. With 13 minutes to go, Johnny King scored, continuing his amazing record of scoring tries in six successive Grand Finals. Souths' Eric Simms kicked a penalty goal, giving them some hope but Saints held their line and at full-time the score was 12–8. St George had won their tenth consecutive Grand Final and Provan bowed out victorious. At the sounding of the full-time siren, the SCG was invaded by thousands of fans and the ground became a sea of people – any chance of a victory lap was soon forgotten. Kevin Ryan was named Man of the Match.

Some records were set in the 1965 Grand Final. The attendance of 78,056 is the record for a rugby league match at the SCG and for thirty four years, until the Sydney Olympic Stadium was opened in 1999, this stood as the highest attendance at a rugby league match in Australia. Norm Provan's ten premiership wins achieved that day stands as the most number of grand final successes by a player. He also holds equal first place with his St George team-mate Brian Clay for the highest number of grand final appearances. Clay's ten appearances include two losses in 1954 and 1955 with Newtown.

St. George 12 (Tries: Smith, King. Goals: Langlands 3.)

South Sydney 8 ( Goals: Longbottom 3, Simms.). Crowd 78,056

== Player statistics ==
The following statistics are as of the conclusion of Round 18.

Top 5 point scorers

| Points | Player | Tries | Goals | Field Goals |
|---|---|---|---|---|
| 177 | Fred Griffiths | 1 | 87 | 0 |
| 141 | Graeme Langlands | 3 | 66 | 0 |
| 129 | Arch Brown | 5 | 57 | 0 |
| 110 | Bob Batty | 2 | 52 | 0 |
| 90 | Keith Barnes | 0 | 45 | 0 |

Top 5 try scorers

| Tries | Player |
|---|---|
| 13 | Ken Irvine |
| 12 | Brian Moore |
| 12 | Nick Yakich |
| 11 | Johnny King |
| 11 | Eddie Lumsden |
| 11 | Michael Cleary |

Top 5 goal scorers

| Goals | Player |
|---|---|
| 87 | Fred Griffiths |
| 66 | Graeme Langlands |
| 57 | Arch Brown |
| 52 | Bob Batty |
| 45 | Keith Barnes |
