= Ivan Jones (rugby league) =

Australian rugby league footballer

Personal information
- Full name: Ivan William Jones
- Born: 10 November 1942 Brisbane, Queensland, Australia
- Died: 22 February 2015 (aged 72) Sydney, New South Wales, Australia

Playing information
- Position: Halfback
Club
Years	Team	Pld	T	G	FG	P
1965–69	South Sydney	80	13	6	0	51
1970	Western Suburbs	1	0	0	0	0
	Total	81	13	6	0	51

Ivan Jones (10 November 1942 – 22 February 2015) was an Australian rugby league footballer who played in the 1960s and 1970s. Jones was a premiership winning halfback with South Sydney.

== Playing career ==
Originally from Brisbane, Jones was a Souths junior who played four first grade seasons with the South Sydney Rabbitohs between 1965 and 1969.

He won a premiership with South Sydney Rabbitohs, playing half-back in the winning 1967 Grand Final team that defeated Canterbury-Bankstown 12–10.

Ivan Jones also played for Souths in the 1965 Grand Final loss to St. George 12–8. He lost his place in the stellar South Sydney first grade team to Bob Grant in 1968, and he finished his career at Western Suburbs Magpies in 1970.

He was awarded Life Membership of Souths in 2002.

Press reports in 2014 suggested that Ivan Jones was not in good health, but he was able to watch his beloved South Sydney Rabbitohs win the 2014 premiership on television in the comfort of his home.

It was reported in the Sydney media that Ivan Jones died on 22 February 2015.
