= Arthur Branighan =

Australian rugby league footballer

Personal information
- Full name: Arthur James Branighan
- Born: 28 January 1943 (age 82); Redfern, New South Wales, Australia

Playing information
- Position: Centre
Club
Years	Team	Pld	T	G	FG	P
1963–71	South Sydney	92	20	0	0	60
- Relatives: Ray Branighan (brother); Luke Branighan (son)

Arthur James Branighan (born 1943) is an Australian former rugby league footballer who played in the 1960s and 1970s.

== Playing career ==
A local junior from the Redfern United Club, Branighan was graded with South Sydney in 1963 and went on to play nine seasons with the club between 1963 and 1971.

He was approached by legendary junior coach, former international Clem Kennedy to play Presidents Cup for South Sydney in 1962, and his career went on from there.

After an illustrious career at Souths, which included two premiership victories in 1968 and 1970 a groin injury forced his retirement in 1972. Branighan was also a member of Souths unsuccessful Grand Final team of 1965 and was a non playing reserve for the 1969 and 1971 Grand Final teams. He is the brother of fellow South Sydney player, Ray Branighan.
