= Peter Armstrong (rugby league) =

Australian rugby league player (1936–2019)

Personal information
- Full name: Peter Raymond Armstrong
- Born: 1936 Sydney, New South Wales, Australia
- Died: 7 April 2019 (aged 82–83) Tweed Heads, New South Wales, Australia

Playing information
- Position: Hooker
Club
| Years | Team | Pld | T | G | FG | P |
|---|---|---|---|---|---|---|
| 1957–64 | St. George | 52 | 8 | 0 | 0 | 24 |
| 1965 | Newtown | 6 | 0 | 0 | 0 | 0 |
| | Total | 58 | 8 | 0 | 0 | 24 |

Peter Armstrong (1936–2019) was an Australian professional rugby league footballer who played in the 1950s and 1960s.

== Playing career ==
Armstrong was a hooker with the St. George Dragons who played eight seasons with the club between 1957 and 1964.

He came into the first grade side when Ken Kearney suffered his career ending injury in 1961. Armstrong became a dual premiership winning player with the St. George Dragons, winning the premiership with them in the 1961 Grand Final and the 1964 Grand Final while deputizing for the injured Ian Walsh.

He finished his career at Newtown in 1965.

== Death ==
Armstrong died on 7 April 2019 at Tweed Heads, New South Wales.
