= Jack Littlejohn =

Australian rugby league footballer (born 1991)

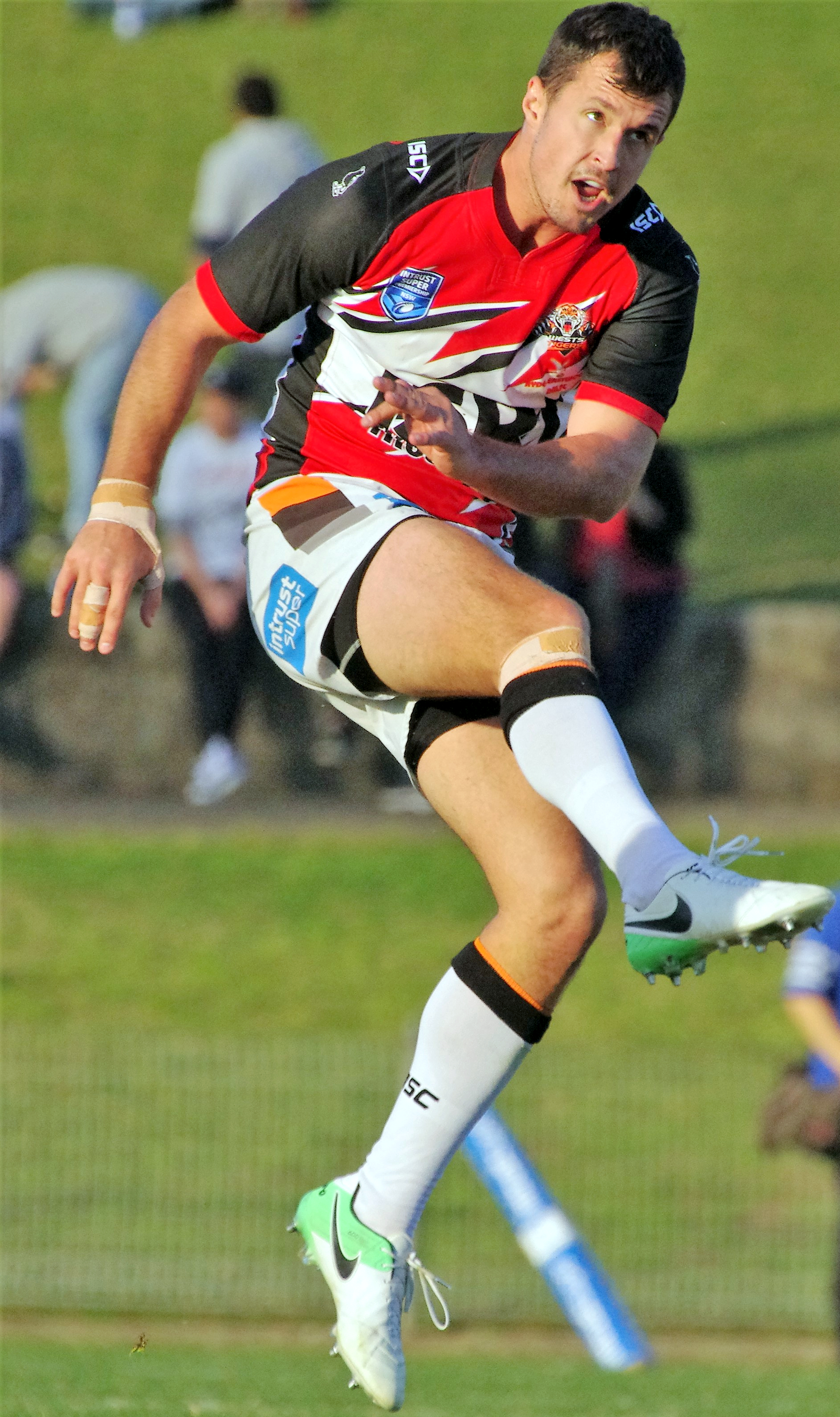

Personal information
- Born: 8 November 1991 (age 35) Wagga Wagga, New South Wales, Australia
- Height: 187 cm (6 ft 2 in)
- Weight: 93 kg (14 st 9 lb)

Playing information
- Position: Halfback, Five-eighth, Hooker
Club
Years	Team	Pld	T	G	FG	P
2014	Manly Sea Eagles	5	0	0	1	1
2016–17	Wests Tigers	16	0	0	0	0
2018	Salford Red Devils	20	3	1	0	14
	Total	41	3	1	1	15
- Source: As of 13 October 2018

Jack Littlejohn (born 8 November 1991) is an Australian professional rugby league footballer who last played for the Salford Red Devils in the Super League. He previously played for the Wests Tigers and the Manly Warringah Sea Eagles in the National Rugby League. He plays as a halfback and five-eighth. He currently plays for the Mudgee Dragons in the Western Premiership

== Background ==
Born in Wagga Wagga, New South Wales, Littlejohn played his junior rugby league for the Wagga Wagga Brothers, before being signed by the Sydney Roosters. Littlejohn currently shares the group 9 highest try scorer in a first grade season with his former teammate and opposite centre for Wagga Wagga Brothers James Campbell who has represented group 9 (Brothers 2011) and group 16 (Narooma Devils 2012) both men scored 32 tries in 24 games with Campbell throwing the pass to Littlejohn that lead to him equalling the record and the try to win the 2011 grand final against Tumut Blues at Twickenham

== Playing career ==
=== Early career ===
In 2010 and 2011, Littlejohn played for the Sydney Roosters' NYC team, before moving on to the Roosters' New South Wales Cup team, Newtown Jets in 2012. On 30 September 2012, he played in the Jets' 2012 New South Wales Cup Grand Final win over the Balmain Ryde-Eastwood Tigers. In 2013, he joined Randwick DRUFC in the Shute Shield, before joining the Canterbury-Bankstown Bulldogs mid-season and playing for their New South Wales Cup team. After impressing for the Bulldogs, he signed a 2-year contract with the Manly Warringah Sea Eagles starting in 2014.

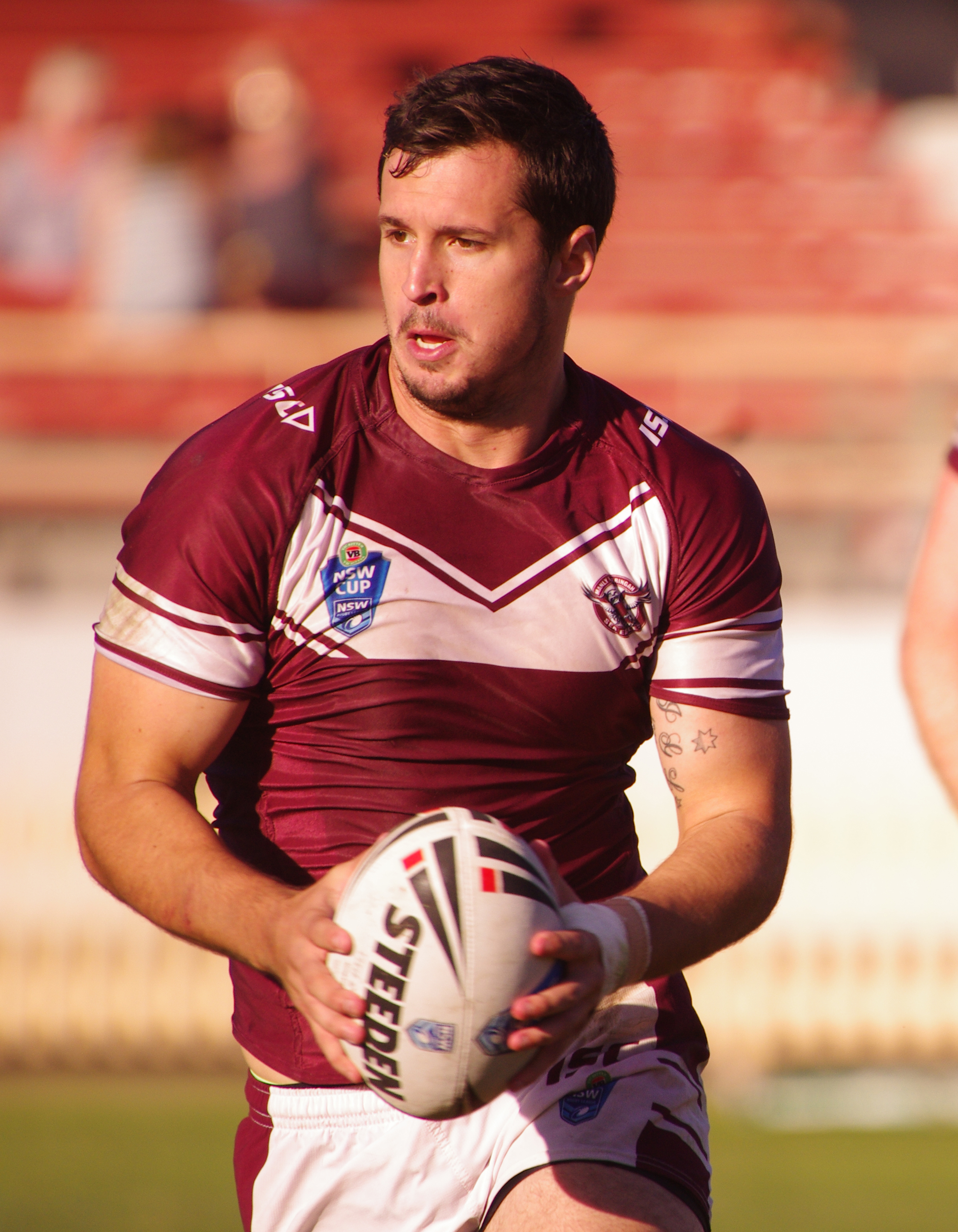
Littlejohn playing for the Sea Eagles

=== 2014 ===
In Round 8 of the 2014 NRL season, Littlejohn made his NRL debut for the Sea Eagles against the Canberra Raiders. He made 5 appearances in the halves over the course of the season.

=== 2015 ===
On 3 August, Littlejohn signed a 1-year contract with the Wests Tigers starting in 2016.

=== 2016 ===
In the absence of regular halfback Luke Brooks, Littlejohn made his debut for Wests Tigers in round 1 against the New Zealand Warriors. He made 2 more similar appearances towards the end of the season.

=== 2017 ===
For the opening three games of the season, Littlejohn was named on the bench and played hooker when he took the field, covering for injuries to Jacob Liddle and Matt Ballin.

After an injury to halfback Luke Brooks, Littlejohn returned to the starting team in round 5. Coach Andrew Webster said, "He was one of our real leaders during pre-season training, the boys love having him around and enjoy playing with him. I’m extremely confident Jack will get the job done.". On 17 November 2017, Littlejohn signed a two-year contract with English side Salford after being told by The Wests Tigers that his contract would not be renewed for the following season.
