= Ken Bray =

Australian rugby league footballer (born 1937)

Personal information
- Full name: Kenneth John Bray
- Born: 1937 (age 88–89) Sydney, New South Wales, Australia

Playing information
- Position: Fullback, Wing
Club
Years	Team	Pld	T	G	FG	P
1957	Balmain	2	0	2	0	4
1960–66	Western Suburbs	38	6	112	0	242
	Total	40	6	114	0	246
- Source: As of 8 May 2019

Ken Bray (born 1937) is an Australian rugby league footballer who played in the 1950s and 1960s. He played for Western Suburbs and Balmain in the New South Wales Rugby League (NSWRL) competition.

== Background ==
Bray was a Balmain junior and played for Drummoyne before being graded by Balmain. Bray then went on to win the third grade premiership and reserve grade premierships with Balmain.

== Playing career ==
Bray made his first grade debut for Balmain against Western Suburbs at Pratten Park in 1957 as a replacement for the injured Keith Barnes. Bray made one further first grade appearance for Balmain but spent the majority of his time in reserve grade. In his final season at Balmain, Bray won the reserve grade premiership at the club.

In 1960, Bray joined Western Suburbs and mainly played reserve grade in his first season as Darcy Russell was the first choice fullback at the club. In 1961, Bray only made 1 appearance for Wests as he suffered a serious knee injury against Newtown in the opening round.

In 1962, Western Suburbs reached their second straight grand final and Bray was called into the grand final team after fullback Don Parish was ruled out injured. Wests went on to lose the grand final 9–6 with Bray kicking 3 goals in a defeated side. In 1964, Wests missed the finals series but Bray did finish the club's top point scorer with 131 points. In his final 2 seasons at Wests, Bray missed the majority of games due to recurring injuries and he retired at the end of 1966.
