= Ron Clothier =

Australian rugby league footballer

Personal information
- Full name: Ronald Clothier

Playing information
- Position: Second-row, Hooker
Club
Years	Team	Pld	T	G	FG	P
1964–68	Balmain	26	5	0	0	15
1969–71	Penrith Panthers	26	5	0	0	15
	Total	52	10	0	0	30
Representative
Years	Team	Pld	T	G	FG	P
1964	New South Wales	1	1	0	0	3
- Source: As of 26 April 2019

Ron Clothier was an Australian professional rugby league footballer who played in the 1960s and 1970s. He played for Balmain and Penrith in the New South Wales Rugby League (NSWRL) competition.

== Playing career ==
Clothier made his first grade debut for Balmain in 1964. In the same season, Balmain reached the 1964 NSWRL grand final by defeating North Sydney and then Parramatta in the preliminary final. The opponents in the grand final were the all conquering St George side. Clothier was selected for the grand final team to cover injuries within the side. Clothier played at second row in the final as Balmain took a shock halftime lead over St George before Saints came back in the second half to win 11–6 at the Sydney Cricket Ground. Clothier was also selected to play for New South Wales in 1964 and featured in one game against Queensland scoring a try.

Clothier missed the 1966 NSWRL season due to injury and did not play in the club's grand final defeat against St George. In 1969, Clothier joined Penrith and played 3 seasons with them before retiring at the end of 1971.
