= Dick Quinn =

Australian rugby league footballer

Personal information
- Full name: Richard Quinn

Playing information
- Position: Wing
Club
Years	Team	Pld	T	G	FG	P
1961–65	Balmain	49	18	0	0	54
1966–67	Newtown	29	9	0	0	27
	Total	78	27	0	0	81
- Source: As of 26 April 2019

Dick Quinn was an Australian professional rugby league footballer who played in the 1960s. He played for Balmain and Newtown in the New South Wales Rugby League (NSWRL) competition.

== Playing career ==
Quinn made his first grade debut for Balmain in 1961. Balmain would go on to reach the preliminary final in 1961 but were defeated by Western Suburbs. In 1963, Quinn finished as the club's top try scorer with 9 tries. Balmain were eliminated from the finals in the first week by Parramatta with Quinn scoring a try in a 9–7 loss.

The following season, Balmain reached the 1964 NSWRL grand final by defeating Parramatta in the preliminary final with Quinn scoring a try. The opponents in the grand final were the all conquering St George side. Quinn played on the wing in the final as Balmain took a shock halftime lead over St George before Saints came back in the second half to win 11–6 at the Sydney Cricket Ground.

Quinn played one final season with Balmain in 1965 before departing to Newtown in 1966. Quinn finished as Newtown's top try scorer in 1966 as the club reached the finals finishing fourth. Newtown were eliminated in the semi-final against Manly-Warringah with Quinn scoring a try in a 10–9 loss. In 1967, Quinn played one final season before retiring as Newtown finished in a disappointing 9th place.
