= Dick Wilson (rugby league) =

Australian rugby league footballer

Personal information
- Full name: Richard Wilson
- Born: Balmain, New South Wales, Australia
- Died: 15 January 2000 Sydney, New South Wales, Australia

Playing information
- Position: Hooker
Club
Years	Team	Pld	T	G	FG	P
1960–66	Balmain	69	4	15	0	42
Representative
Years	Team	Pld	T	G	FG	P
1963	New South Wales	1	0	0	0	0
- Source: As of 26 April 2019

Dick Wilson was an Australian professional rugby league footballer who played in the 1960s. He played for Balmain in the New South Wales Rugby League (NSWRL) competition.

== Playing career ==
Wilson made his first grade debut for Balmain in 1960. In 1963, Wilson was selected to play for New South Wales and played in one game against Queensland which New South Wales won convincingly 31-5. At club level, Wilson played in Balmain's semi final defeat against Parramatta.

Balmain reached the 1964 NSWRL grand final by defeating North Sydney and then Parramatta in the preliminary final. The opponents in the grand final were the all conquering St George side. Wilson played at hooker in the final as Balmain took a shock halftime lead over St George before Saints came back in the second half to win 11-6 at the Sydney Cricket Ground.

Wilson played with Balmain until the end of the 1966 season. He missed out selection in the 1966 NSWRL grand final against St George which Balmain lost. Wilson was then controversially sacked by the Balmain club after it was revealed that he had been betting on matches. Wilson's former teammate Arthur Beetson later came to the defense of Wilson citing hypocrisy from the NSWRL board. Wilson died on 15 January 2000.
