= George Piper (rugby league) =

Australian rugby league footballer

Personal information
- Full name: George Piper
- Born: 10 June 1941; Sydney, New South Wales, Australia
- Died: 22 September 1968 (aged 27); Balmain, New South Wales, Australia

Playing information
- Position: Prop
Club
Years	Team	Pld	T	G	FG	P
1960–66	Balmain	65	10	0	0	30
1967–68	Penrith	25	2	0	0	6
	Total	90	12	0	0	36

George Piper (10 June 1941 – 22 September 1968) was an Australian rugby league footballer who played as a Prop in the 1960s for Penrith and Balmain. Piper was an inaugural player for Penrith and played in the club's first season.

== Playing career ==
Piper made his first grade debut for Balmain in 1960. In 1964, Piper played in the grand final against St George which ended in an 11–6 loss. In 1966, Balmain made the grand final against the same opponents where they were comprehensively beaten 23–4. Piper did not feature in the match due to injury. In 1967, Piper joined Penrith and played in their inaugural season where the club finished second last on the table. In 1968, Penrith won the pre-season cup competition with Piper playing in the match. Later that year on 22 September, Piper was killed outside a Balmain nightclub after suffering head injuries following a fight. He was 27 years of age.
