= Luke Branighan =

Malta international rugby league footballer

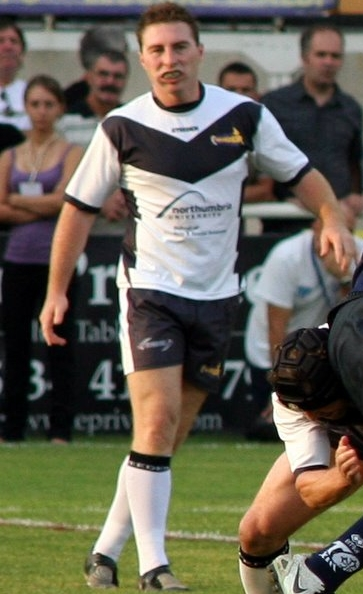

Personal information
- Born: 29 June 1981 (age 44)

Playing information
- Position: Five-eighth
Club
Years	Team	Pld	T	G	FG	P
2000	St George Illawarra	15	2	0	0	8
2001–02	Cronulla-Sutherland	1	0	0	0	0
2009	Gateshead Thunder	26	21	9	0	102
2010	Halifax	24	14	9	0	74
	Total	66	37	18	0	184
Representative
Years	Team	Pld	T	G	FG	P
2005	Malta	1	0	0	0	0
2006	Queensland Residents	1	0	1	0	2
- Source: As of 4 January 2024
- Father: Arthur Branighan
- Relatives: Ray Branighan (uncle)

Luke Branighan (born 29 June 1981) is an Australian former professional rugby league footballer who played in the 2000s. He played in the National Rugby League for the St George Illawarra Dragons and Cronulla-Sutherland Sharks, primarily as a five-eighth.

He is the nephew of both Ray Branighan and son of Arthur Branighan.

== Career ==
Branighan made his debut with St George Illawarra halfway through 2000. He remained in the first-grade team for the rest of the season, playing in the halves with Trent Barrett. He joined the Sharks in 2001, but made only one further NRL appearance.

While playing for NSW Cup side Balmain Tigers in 2005, Branighan was selected to tour with the Malta Knights. In 2009 he played for the Gateshead Thunder and in 2010 he played for Halifax in the Co-operative Championship.

Returning to Australia, Branighan played for Mounties in the Bundaberg Red Cup in 2011. In 2012, he became captain-coach of the Young Cherrypickers in the Group 9 competition.
