= 2022 Newcastle Knights season =

National Rugby League NSW season

- NRL Rank: 14th
- 2022 record: Wins: 6; draws: 0; losses: 18
- Points scored: For: 372; against: 662

Team information
- CEO: Phil Gardner
- Coach: Adam O'Brien
- Captain: Jayden Brailey & Kalyn Ponga
- Stadium: McDonald Jones Stadium
- Avg. attendance: 16,890
- High attendance: 25,169

Top scorers
- Tries: Edrick Lee & Dom Young (14)
- Goals: Jake Clifford (19)
- Points: Edrick Lee & Dom Young (56)
← 2021	2023 →

The 2022 Newcastle Knights season was the 35th in the club's history. Coached by Adam O'Brien and co-captained by Jayden Brailey and Kalyn Ponga, they competed in the NRL's 2022 Telstra Premiership, finishing the regular season in 14th place (out of 16).

== Squad ==
Newcastle Knights 2022 squad
2022 NRL top 30 squad			Development list	Coaching staff
235 Dane Gagai – CE, WG; 261 Lachlan Fitzgibbon – SR; 268 Daniel Saifiti – PR; 269 Jacob Saifiti – PR, SR; 276 Mitchell Barnett – PR, SR, CE; 295 Mitchell Pearce – HB (pre-season loss); 296 Kalyn Ponga (c) – FB (gk); 300 Pasami Saulo – PR, SR; 304 Hymel Hunt – WG; 305 David Klemmer – PR; 306 Edrick Lee – WG	307 Kurt Mann – LK, FB, CE; 310 Phoenix Crossland – LK, HB, HK, FE; 311 Bradman Best – CE; 312 Starford To'a – WG (pre-season loss); 313 Jayden Brailey (c) – HK; 315 Enari Tuala – WG, CE; 317 Chris Randall – HK; 318 Brodie Jones – SR, LK, CE; 321 Tyson Frizell (vc) – SR; 322 Sauaso Sue – PR, LK; 323 Dom Young – WG	324 Brayden Musgrove – WG; 325 Simi Sasagi – LK, CE; 326 Jake Clifford – FE, HB (gk); 328 Jack Johns – SR; 329 Jirah Momoisea – SR, PR; 330 Adam Clune – HB; 331 Leo Thompson – PR, LK; 332 Anthony Milford – FE, FB (gk); 333 Krystian Mapapalangi – CE; 000 Bailey Hodgson – FB; 000 Jacob Kiraz – WG (pre-season loss)	316 Tex Hoy – FB, FE (gk); 327 Mat Croker – PR, LK, SR; Chris Vea'ila – CE; Extended squad: 278 Dylan Phythian – FE; 334 Oryn Keeley – SR; Dylan Lucas – CE; Jaron Purcell – LK; Kobe Rugless – HK; Ben Talty – SR	Head coach: Adam O'Brien; Assistant coaches: Rory Kostjasyn; Willie Peters; Eric Smith; Mark O'Meley - NSW Cup coach; Tony Gleeson - Jersey Flegg Cup coach; Legend: (c) Captain(s); (vc) Vice-captain(s); Updated: 6 August 2022; Source(s): Newcastle Knights Profiles, Rugby League Project

== Transfers and Re-signings ==
=== Gains ===
Player/Coach	Previous club	Length	Source
Adam Clune	St. George Illawarra Dragons	2023	
Dane Gagai	South Sydney Rabbitohs	2024	
Tony Gleeson (Jersey Flegg Cup coach)		2022	
Anthony Milford	Free agent	2022	
Dylan Phythian	Central Newcastle Butcher Boys	2022	
Kobe Rugless	Sydney Roosters	2022	
Leo Thompson	Canberra Raiders	2023	

=== Losses ===
Player/Coach	Club	Source
Blake Green	Retirement	
Josh King	Melbourne Storm	
Jacob Kiraz	Canterbury-Bankstown Bulldogs	
Christian Ma'anaima	Wests Tigers	
Mitchell Pearce	Catalans Dragons	
Andrew Ryan (NSW Cup coach)	South Newcastle Lions	
Gehamat Shibasaki	Green Rockets Tokatsu	
Garrett Smith	New Zealand Warriors	
Starford To'a	Wests Tigers	
Connor Watson	Sydney Roosters	

=== Promoted juniors ===
Player	Junior side	Source
Oryn Keeley	Knights Jersey Flegg Cup	
Krystian Mapapalangi	Knights NSW Cup	
Ben Talty	Knights NSW Cup	

=== Change of role ===
Player/Coach	New role	Source
Mark O'Meley (Harold Matthews Cup coach)	Knights NSW Cup coach	

=== Re-signings ===
Player/Coach	Re-signed to	Source
Mat Croker	2024	
Phoenix Crossland	2022	
Tex Hoy	2022	
Jack Johns	2023	
Edrick Lee	2022	
Kalyn Ponga	2027	
Jaron Purcell	2022	
Chris Randall	2023	
Simi Sasagi	2024	
Leo Thompson	2025	
Enari Tuala	2023	

=== Player contract situations ===
2022 (left)	2023	2024	2025	2026	2027
Mitchell Barnett	Adam Clune	Bradman Best	Jayden Brailey	Daniel Saifiti	Kalyn Ponga
Jake Clifford	Phoenix Crossland	Mat Croker	Leo Thompson		
Tex Hoy	Lachlan Fitzgibbon	Dane Gagai			
Jacob Kiraz	Tyson Frizell	Krystian Mapapalangi			
Edrick Lee	Bailey Hodgson	Jacob Saifiti			
Anthony Milford	Hymel Hunt	Simi Sasagi			
Jirah Momoisea	Jack Johns				
Brayden Musgrove	Brodie Jones				
Mitchell Pearce	David Klemmer				
Pasami Saulo	Kurt Mann				
Sauaso Sue	Chris Randall				
Starford To'a	Enari Tuala				
	Chris Vea'ila				
	Dom Young				

== Ladder ==
2022 NRL season
Pos	Team	Pld	W	D	L	B	PF	PA	PD	Pts
1	Penrith Panthers (P)	24	20	0	4	1	636	330	+306	42
2	Cronulla-Sutherland Sharks	24	18	0	6	1	573	364	+209	38
3	North Queensland Cowboys	24	17	0	7	1	633	361	+272	36
4	Parramatta Eels	24	16	0	8	1	608	489	+119	34
5	Melbourne Storm	24	15	0	9	1	657	410	+247	32
6	Sydney Roosters	24	15	0	9	1	635	434	+201	32
7	South Sydney Rabbitohs	24	14	0	10	1	604	474	+130	30
8	Canberra Raiders	24	14	0	10	1	524	461	+63	30
9	Brisbane Broncos	24	13	0	11	1	514	550	−36	28
10	St. George Illawarra Dragons	24	12	0	12	1	469	569	−100	26
11	Manly Warringah Sea Eagles	24	9	0	15	1	490	595	−105	20
12	Canterbury-Bankstown Bulldogs	24	7	0	17	1	383	575	−192	16
13	Gold Coast Titans	24	6	0	18	1	455	660	−205	14
14	Newcastle Knights	24	6	0	18	1	372	662	−290	14
15	New Zealand Warriors	24	6	0	18	1	408	700	−292	14
16	Wests Tigers	24	4	0	20	1	352	679	−327	10

== Milestones ==
- Round 1: Adam Clune made his debut for the club, after previously playing for the St. George Illawarra Dragons.
- Round 1: Kurt Mann played his 150th career game.
- Round 1: Leo Thompson made his NRL debut for the club.
- Round 2: Tyson Frizell captained his 1st game for the club.
- Round 2: Jacob Saifiti played his 100th career game.
- Round 4: Tyson Frizell played his 200th career game.
- Round 4: Adam O'Brien coached his 50th career game.
- Round 5: Enari Tuala played his 50th game for the club.
- Round 10: Adam Clune scored his 1st try for the club.
- Round 11: Anthony Milford made his debut for the club, after previously playing for the Brisbane Broncos.
- Round 15: Mat Croker scored his 1st career try.
- Round 16: Edrick Lee scored 5 tries, breaking the club record of most tries scored in a match by one player for the Knights.
- Round 16: Anthony Milford kicked his 1st goal for the club.
- Round 17: David Klemmer scored his 1st try for the club.
- Round 18: Anthony Milford played his 200th career game.
- Round 22: Jayden Brailey played his 100th career game.
- Round 23: Oryn Keeley made his NRL debut for the club.
- Round 23: Krystian Mapapalangi made his NRL debut for the club.

== Jerseys and sponsors ==
In 2022, the Knights' jerseys were made by O'Neills and their major sponsor was nib Health Funds.

2022 Home Jersey	2022 Away Jersey	2022 Anzac Jersey	2022 Indigenous Jersey	2022 NSW Mining 10 Year Anniversary Jersey	2022 Women In League Jersey

== Fixtures ==
=== Pre-season Trials ===
Date	Opponent	Venue	Score	Tries	Conversions	Attendance
Monday, 21 February	Canterbury-Bankstown Bulldogs	McDonald Jones Stadium	16–16	J.Clifford, J.Momoisea, D.Young	J.Clifford (2/3)	
Sunday, 27 February	Melbourne Storm	Mars Stadium	10–24	B.Best, J.Clifford	J.Clifford (1/2)	5,127
Legend: Win Loss Draw

== Statistics ==
Name	Appearances	Tries	Goals	Field goals	Points	Captain	Age
Mitchell Barnett	14	1	0	0	4	0	28
Bradman Best	14	5	0	0	20	0	21
Jayden Brailey	8	1	0	0	4	5	26
Jake Clifford	12	2	19	0	46	0	24
Adam Clune	18	2	0	0	8	0	27
Mat Croker	16	1	0	0	4	0	23
Phoenix Crossland	19	1	0	0	4	0	22
Lachlan Fitzgibbon	9	0	0	0	0	0	28
Tyson Frizell	21	3	0	0	12	5	31
Dane Gagai	20	5	0	0	20	0	31
Tex Hoy	12	3	7	0	26	0	23
Hymel Hunt	1	0	0	0	0	0	29
Jack Johns	3	0	0	0	0	0	25
Brodie Jones	13	0	0	0	0	0	24
Oryn Keeley	1	0	0	0	0	0	19
David Klemmer	18	1	0	0	4	0	29
Edrick Lee	16	14	0	0	56	0	30
Kurt Mann	11	1	0	0	4	0	29
Krystian Mapapalangi	2	0	0	0	0	0	20
Anthony Milford	13	0	8	0	16	0	28
Jirah Momoisea	5	0	0	0	0	0	24
Kalyn Ponga	14	4	12	0	40	14	24
Chris Randall	17	1	0	0	4	0	27
Daniel Saifiti	19	2	0	0	8	0	26
Jacob Saifiti	23	1	0	0	4	0	26
Simi Sasagi	14	0	0	0	0	0	21
Pasami Saulo	11	0	0	0	0	0	24
Sauaso Sue	6	0	0	0	0	0	30
Leo Thompson	16	0	0	0	0	0	22
Enari Tuala	21	8	0	0	32	0	24
Dom Young	20	14	0	0	56	0	21
Totals	24	70	46	0	372	–	Average: 26

31 players used.

== NRL Women's team ==
=== 2021 season ===
2022 Newcastle Knights season
- NRLW Rank: 6th (last)
- 2021 record: Wins: 0; draws: 0; losses: 5
- Points scored: For: 48; against: 123

Team information
- CEO: Phil Gardner
- Coach: Casey Bromilow
- Captain: Caitlan Johnston, Krystal Rota & Romy Teitzel
- Stadium: McDonald Jones Stadium
- Avg. attendance: 5,019
- High attendance: 5,019

Top scorers
- Tries: Romy Teitzel (2)
- Goals: Kirra Dibb (4)
- Points: Kirra Dibb & Romy Teitzel (8)
2023 →

Newcastle Knights women's – 2021 squad
2021 NRLW top 24 squad			Development list	Coaching staff
1 Rangimarie Edwards-Bruce – SR, CE; 2 Jayme Fressard – CE; 3 Katie Green – WG; 4 Caitlan Johnston (c) – PR, SR; 5 Bobbi Law – CE; 6 Annetta Nu'uausala – PR; 7 Georgia Page – SR; 8 Charntay Poko – LK, HB (gk); 9 Krystal Rota (c) – HK	10 Autumn-Rain Stephens-Daly – WG, FE; 11 Romy Teitzel (c) – FB; 12 Tahlulah Tillett – HB; 13 Katelyn Vaha'akolo – WG; 14 Charlotte Scanlan – PR; 15 Emma Manzelmann – HK; 16 Phoebe Desmond – PR; 17 Kirra Dibb – FE, LK, HB (gk); 18 Maitua Feterika – PR, SR	19 Ngatokotoru Arakua – PR; 20 Kararaina Wira-Kohu – PR; 21 Kyra Simon – PR; 22 Paige Parker – CE; 23 Shannon Evans – HK; 24 Chantelle Graham – LK; Emma Sykes – WG (pre-season loss)	Bree Chester – SR; Kayla Romaniuk – LK; Extended squad: Sophie Clancy – HK; Matilda Jones – HB; Jesse Southwell – FE; Tylah Vallance – FB	Head coach: Casey Bromilow; Assistant coach: Jess Skinner; Legend: (c) Captain(s); (vc) Vice-captain(s); Updated: 29 March 2022; Source(s): Newcastle Knights Profiles, Rugby League Project

=== Women's Gains 2021 ===
Player/Coach	Previous club	Length	Source
Ngatokotoru Arakua	Chiefs	2022	
Casey Bromilow (head coach)	Knights Tarsha Gale Cup	2022	
Bree Chester	Knights Tarsha Gale Cup	2022	
Sophie Clancy	Knights Tarsha Gale Cup	2022	
Phoebe Desmond	Newcastle Maitland Region Knights	2022	
Kirra Dibb	New Zealand Warriors	2022	
Rangimarie Edwards-Bruce	North Queensland Gold Stars	2022	
Shannon Evans	Central Coast Roosters	2022	
Maitua Feterika	New Zealand Warriors	2022	
Jayme Fressard	Brisbane Broncos	2022	
Chantelle Graham	Newcastle Maitland Region Knights	2022	
Katie Green	North Queensland Gold Stars	2022	
Caitlan Johnston	Central Coast Roosters	2022	
Matilda Jones	Knights Tarsha Gale Cup	2022	
Bobbi Law	Sydney Roosters	2022	
Emma Manzelmann	North Queensland Gold Stars	2022	
Annetta Nu'uausala	New Zealand Warriors	2022	
Georgia Page	St. George Illawarra Dragons	2022	
Paige Parker	Gold Coast Suns	2022	
Charntay Poko	Canterbury	2022	
Kayla Romaniuk	Knights Tarsha Gale Cup	2022	
Krystal Rota	Manurewa Marlins	2022	
Charlotte Scanlan	Japanese Rugby union	2022	
Kyra Simon	Knights Tarsha Gale Cup	2022	
Jess Skinner (assistant coach)	Indigenous All Stars (Women's)	2022	
Jesse Southwell	Australia rugby sevens	2022	
Autumn-Rain Stephens-Daly	Bay of Plenty Rugby Union	2022	
Emma Sykes	Australia rugby sevens	2022	
Romy Teitzel	Brisbane Broncos	2022	
Tahlulah Tillett	North Queensland Gold Stars	2022	
Katelyn Vaha'akolo	Moana Pasifika	2022	
Tylah Vallance	Knights Tarsha Gale Cup	2022	
Kararaina Wira-Kohu	Papakura Sisters	2022	

=== Women's Ladder 2022 ===
2021 NRL Women's season
Pos	Team	Pld	W	D	L	PF	PA	PD	Pts
1	Brisbane Broncos	5	4	0	1	134	64	+70	8
2	St. George Illawarra Dragons	5	4	0	1	104	48	+56	8
3	Gold Coast Titans	5	3	0	2	94	96	−2	6
4	Sydney Roosters	5	2	0	3	77	92	−15	4
5	Parramatta Eels	5	2	0	3	59	93	−34	4
6	Newcastle Knights	5	0	0	5	48	123	−75	0

Source: NRL.com

=== Women's Milestones 2021 ===
- Round 1: Phoebe Desmond made her NRLW debut for the club and scored her 1st career try.
- Round 1: Kirra Dibb made her debut for the club, after previously playing for the New Zealand Warriors and kicked her 1st goal for the club.
- Round 1: Rangimarie Edwards-Bruce made her NRLW debut for the club.
- Round 1: Jayme Fressard made her debut for the club, after previously playing for the Brisbane Broncos.
- Round 1: Katie Green made her NRLW debut for the club.
- Round 1: Caitlan Johnston made her debut for the club, after previously playing for the Sydney Roosters.
- Round 1: Bobbi Law made her debut for the club, after previously playing for the Sydney Roosters.
- Round 1: Emma Manzelmann made her NRLW debut for the club.
- Round 1: Annetta Nu'uausala made her debut for the club, after previously playing for the New Zealand Warriors.
- Round 1: Georgia Page made her debut for the club, after previously playing for the St. George Illawarra Dragons.
- Round 1: Charntay Poko made her debut for the club, after previously playing for the New Zealand Warriors and kicked her 1st career goal.
- Round 1: Krystal Rota made her debut for the club, after previously playing for the New Zealand Warriors.
- Round 1: Charlotte Scanlan made her NRLW debut for the club.
- Round 1: Autumn-Rain Stephens-Daly made her NRLW debut for the club.
- Round 1: Romy Teitzel made her debut for the club, after previously playing for the Brisbane Broncos, scored her 1st career try and captained her 1st game for the club.
- Round 1: Tahlulah Tillett made her NRLW debut for the club.
- Round 1: Katelyn Vaha'akolo made her NRLW debut for the club.
- Round 2: Ngatokotoru Arakua made her debut for the club, after previously playing for the St. George Illawarra Dragons.
- Round 2: Maitua Feterika made her debut for the club, after previously playing for the St. George Illawarra Dragons and scored her 1st try for the club.
- Round 2: Jayme Fressard scored her 1st career try.
- Round 3: Annetta Nu'uausala scored her 1st try for the club.
- Round 4: Kyra Simon made her NRLW debut for the club.
- Round 4: Autumn-Rain Stephens-Daly scored her 1st career try.
- Round 4: Kararaina Wira-Kohu made her NRLW debut for the club.
- Round 5: Shannon Evans made her NRLW debut for the club.
- Round 5: Chantelle Graham made her NRLW debut for the club.
- Round 5: Paige Parker made her NRLW debut for the club and scored her 1st career try.
- Round 5: Katelyn Vaha'akolo scored her 1st career try.

=== Women's Statistics 2021 ===
Name	Appearances	Tries	Goals	Field goals	Points	Captain	Age
Ngatokotoru Arakua	2	0	0	0	0	0	25
Phoebe Desmond	4	1	0	0	4	0	32
Kirra Dibb	5	0	4	0	8	0	25
Rangimarie Edwards-Bruce	5	0	0	0	0	0	25
Shannon Evans	1	0	0	0	0	0	29
Maitua Feterika	3	1	0	0	4	0	30
Jayme Fressard	4	1	0	0	4	0	25
Chantelle Graham	1	0	0	0	0	0	27
Katie Green	3	0	0	0	0	0	26
Caitlan Johnston	1	0	0	0	0	0	21
Bobbi Law	5	0	0	0	0	0	25
Emma Manzelmann	5	0	0	0	0	0	21
Annetta Nu'uausala	5	1	0	0	4	0	27
Georgia Page	4	0	0	0	0	0	27
Paige Parker	1	1	0	0	4	0	27
Charntay Poko	5	0	2	0	4	0	27
Krystal Rota	4	0	0	0	0	0	37
Charlotte Scanlan	5	0	0	0	0	0	34
Kyra Simon	2	0	0	0	0	0	20
Autumn-Rain Stephens-Daly	5	1	0	0	4	0	26
Romy Teitzel	5	2	0	0	8	5	23
Tahlulah Tillett	4	0	0	0	0	0	24
Katelyn Vaha'akolo	5	1	0	0	4	0	22
Kararaina Wira-Kohu	1	0	0	0	0	0	30
Totals	5	9	6	0	48	–	Average: 25

24 players used.

=== 2022 season ===
2022 Newcastle Knights season
- NRLW Rank: 2nd
- Play-off result: Premiers
- 2022 record: Wins: 4; draws: 0; losses: 1
- Points scored: For: 112; against: 68

Team information
- CEO: Phil Gardner
- Coach: Ronald Griffiths
- Captain: Millie Boyle & Hannah Southwell
- Stadium: McDonald Jones Stadium
- Avg. attendance: 8,323
- High attendance: 8,323

Top scorers
- Tries: Tamika Upton (5)
- Goals: Kirra Dibb (15)
- Points: Kirra Dibb (34)
2023 →

Newcastle Knights women's – 2022 squad
2022 NRLW top 24 squad			Development list	Coaching staff
4 Caitlan Johnston – PR, SR; 5 Bobbi Law – CE, WG; 10 Autumn-Rain Stephens-Daly – WG; 11 Romy Teitzel – SR, CE; 15 Emma Manzelmann – HK; 17 Kirra Dibb – FE (gk); 21 Kyra Simon – PR; 25 Millie Boyle (c) – PR; 26 Yasmin Clydsdale – SR, CE	27 Olivia Higgins – HK, LK; 28 Shanice Parker – CE, FB; 29 Hannah Southwell (c) – LK; 30 Jesse Southwell – HB (gk); 31 Kiana Takairangi – WG, CE; 32 Tamika Upton – FB; 33 Tayla Predebon – PR, LK; 34 Simone Karpani – LK; 35 Makenzie Weale – SR	36 Jakiya Whitfeld – WG; 37 Tiana Davison – SR; 38 Caitlin Moran – FE; 39 Emmanita Paki – WG, CE; 40 Jessica Gentle – WG; 41 Kayla Romaniuk – LK; Tamsin Barber – WG; Nicole Nathan – WG	Bree Chester – SR	Head coach: Ronald Griffiths; Legend: (c) Captain(s); (vc) Vice-captain(s); Updated: 4 October 2022; Source(s): Newcastle Knights Profiles, Rugby League Project

=== Women's Gains 2022 ===
Player/Coach	Previous club	Length	Source
Tamsin Barber	Brumbies	2022	
Millie Boyle	Brisbane Broncos	2022	
Yasmin Clydsdale	Sydney Roosters	2022	
Tiana Davison	Clifton Rugby Club	2022	
Jessica Gentle	Central Coast Roosters	2022	
Ronald Griffiths (head coach)	Wests Tigers	2022	
Olivia Higgins	Sydney Roosters	2022	
Simone Karpani	Sydney Roosters	2022	
Caitlin Moran	Wests Panthers	2022	
Nicole Nathan	New South Wales Waratahs	2022	
Emmanita Paki	Central Queensland Capras	2022	
Shanice Parker	North Sydney Bears	2022	
Tayla Predebon	Sydney Roosters	2022	
Hannah Southwell	Sydney Roosters	2022	
Kiana Takairangi	Cronulla-Sutherland Sharks	2022	
Tamika Upton	Brisbane Broncos	2022	
Makenzie Weale	Wests Panthers	2022	
Jakiya Whitfeld	Australian Rugby Sevens	2022	

=== Women's Losses 2022 ===
Player/Coach	Club	Source
Ngatokotoru Arakua	Released	
Phoebe Desmond	Released	
Rangimarie Edwards-Bruce	Released	
Shannon Evans	Released	
Maitua Feterika	Released	
Jayme Fressard	Sydney Roosters	
Chantelle Graham	Released	
Katie Green	Released	
Annetta Nu'uausala	Brisbane Broncos	
Georgia Page	Released	
Paige Parker	Brisbane Broncos	
Charntay Poko	Released	
Krystal Rota	Released	
Charlotte Scanlan	Released	
Emma Sykes	Released	
Tahlulah Tillett	Released	
Katelyn Vaha'akolo	Released	
Kararaina Wira-Kohu	Released	

=== Women's Change of role 2022 ===
Player/Coach	New role	Source
Casey Bromilow (head coach)	Knights Elite Pathways Program Manager	

=== Women's Re-signings 2022 ===
Player/Coach	Re-signed to	Source
Kirra Dibb	2022	
Caitlan Johnston	2022	
Bobbi Law	2022	
Emma Manzelmann	2022	
Kyra Simon	2022	
Autumn-Rain Stephens-Daly	2022	
Romy Teitzel	2022	

=== Women's Ladder 2022 ===
2022 NRL Women's season
Pos	Team	Pld	W	D	L	B	PF	PA	PD	Pts
1	Sydney Roosters	5	5	0	0	0	156	58	+98	10
2	Newcastle Knights	5	4	0	1	0	112	68	+44	8
3	St. George Illawarra Dragons	5	3	0	2	0	75	104	−29	6
4	Parramatta Eels	5	1	0	4	0	86	106	−20	2
5	Brisbane Broncos	5	1	0	4	0	78	111	−33	2
6	Gold Coast Titans	5	1	0	4	0	58	118	−60	2

=== Women's Milestones 2022 ===
- Round 1: Millie Boyle made her debut for the club, after previously playing for the Brisbane Broncos and captained her 1st game for the club.
- Round 1: Yasmin Clydsdale made her debut for the club, after previously playing for the Sydney Roosters.
- Round 1: Olivia Higgins made her debut for the club, after previously playing for the Sydney Roosters.
- Round 1: Caitlan Johnston scored her 1st career try.
- Round 1: Simone Karpani made her debut for the club, after previously playing for the Sydney Roosters.
- Round 1: Bobbi Law scored her 1st try for the club.
- Round 1: Shanice Parker made her debut for the club, after previously playing for the Sydney Roosters.
- Round 1: Tayla Predebon made her debut for the club, after previously playing for the Sydney Roosters and scored her 1st career try.
- Round 1: Hannah Southwell made her debut for the club, after previously playing for the Sydney Roosters and captained her 1st game for the club.
- Round 1: Jesse Southwell made her NRLW debut for the club and scored her 1st career try. She became the youngest player to debut in NRLW history.
- Round 1: Kiana Takairangi made her debut for the club, after previously playing for the Sydney Roosters.
- Round 1: Tamika Upton made her debut for the club, after previously playing for the Brisbane Broncos.
- Round 2: Emma Manzelmann scored her 1st career try.
- Round 2: Tamika Upton scored her 1st try for the club.
- Round 2: Makenzie Weale made her NRLW debut for the club.
- Round 3: Tiana Davison made her NRLW debut for the club.
- Round 3: Olivia Higgins scored her 1st try for the club.
- Round 3: Caitlin Moran made her NRLW debut for the club.
- Round 3: Jakiya Whitfeld made her NRLW debut for the club.
- Round 4: Yasmin Clydsdale scored her 1st try for the club.
- Round 4: Emmanita Paki made her NRLW debut for the club.
- Round 4: Jesse Southwell kicked her 1st career goal.
- Round 5: Jessica Gentle made her NRLW debut for the club and scored her 1st career try.
- Round 5: Emmanita Paki scored her 1st career try.
- Round 5: Kayla Romaniuk made her NRLW debut for the club.
- Round 5: Kiana Takairangi scored her 1st career try.
- Round 5: Makenzie Weale scored her 1st career try.
- Semi Final: Millie Boyle scored her 1st try for the club.
- Semi Final: Kirra Dibb scored her 1st try for the club.
- Semi Final: Tamika Upton became the first Knight to score more than one try in a game.

=== Women's Statistics 2022 ===
Name	Appearances	Tries	Goals	Field goals	Points	Captain	Age
Millie Boyle	7	1	0	0	4	7	24
Yasmin Clydsdale	7	2	0	0	8	0	28
Tiana Davison	2	0	0	0	0	0	22
Kirra Dibb	7	1	15	0	34	0	25
Jessica Gentle	1	1	0	0	4	0	26
Olivia Higgins	7	2	0	0	8	0	30
Caitlan Johnston	7	2	0	0	8	0	21
Simone Karpani	6	0	0	0	0	0	25
Bobbi Law	6	1	0	0	4	0	25
Emma Manzelmann	7	2	0	0	8	0	21
Caitlin Moran	4	0	0	0	0	0	26
Emmanita Paki	4	2	0	0	8	0	19
Shanice Parker	7	0	0	0	0	0	24
Tayla Predebon	7	2	0	0	8	0	22
Kayla Romaniuk	3	0	0	0	0	0	20
Kyra Simon	2	0	0	0	0	0	20
Hannah Southwell	1	0	0	0	0	1	23
Jesse Southwell	7	2	6	0	20	0	17
Autumn-Rain Stephens-Daly	3	2	0	0	8	0	26
Kiana Takairangi	6	4	0	0	16	0	30
Romy Teitzel	7	3	0	0	12	0	23
Tamika Upton	5	5	0	0	20	0	25
Makenzie Weale	4	1	0	0	4	0	20
Jakiya Whitfeld	2	0	0	0	0	0	21
Totals	7	33	21	0	174	–	Average: 24

24 players used.

== Representative honours ==
The following players appeared in a representative match or were named in a representative squad in 2022.

Australian Jillaroos

- Millie Boyle (squad member)
- Yasmin Clydsdale
- Caitlan Johnston
- Tamika Upton (squad member)

Cook Islands (Women's)

- Kiana Takairangi

England

- Dom Young

Fiji

- Kurt Donoghoe (extended squad)
- Daniel Saifiti (extended squad)
- Jacob Saifiti (extended squad)
- Tevita Toloi

Indigenous All Stars (Women's)

- Bree Chester (squad member)
- Kirra Dibb
- Caitlan Johnston
- Bobbi Law
- Kyra Simon
- Tahlulah Tillett

Māori All Stars

- Pasami Saulo (squad member)

Māori All Stars (Women's)

- Rangimarie Edwards-Bruce
- Krystal Rota
- Autumn-Rain Stephens-Daly
- Katelyn Vaha'akolo

New South Wales Blues

- Tyson Frizell (19th man)
- Jacob Saifiti

New South Wales Blues (Women's)

- Kirra Dibb
- Caitlan Johnston

New South Wales Blues extended squad (Women's)

- Bobbi Law

New Zealand Kiwi Ferns

- Ngatokotoru Arakua
- Annetta Nu'uausala
- Shanice Parker
- Charlotte Scanlan
- Autumn-Rain Stephens-Daly
- Katelyn Vaha'akolo
- Kararaina Wira-Kohu

Papua New Guinea (Women's)

- Anika Butler

Queensland Maroons

- Dane Gagai
- Kalyn Ponga

Queensland Maroons (Women's)

- Romy Teitzel (20th man)

Queensland Maroons extended squad (Women's)

- Emma Manzelmann
- Romy Teitzel

Samoa

- Anthony Milford

== Individual honours ==
=== Newcastle Knights awards ===
- Player of the Year (Danny Buderus Medal): Tyson Frizell
- Excalibur Club Players' Player: David Klemmer
- Gladiator of the Year: Dom Young
- Community Player of the Year: Jayden Brailey
- Rookie of the Year: Leo Thompson
- Knight in Shining Armour: Dom Young
- NSW Cup Player of the Year: Luke Huth
- NSW Cup Excalibur Club Players' Player: Luke Huth
- Jersey Flegg Player of the Year: Thomas Cant
- Jersey Flegg Players' Player: Brock Greacen & James Johnson
- Club Person of the Year Paul Wallace
- NRLW Player of the Year 2021: Annetta Nu'uausala
- NRLW Player of the Year 2022: Shanice Parker & Jesse Southwell
- NRLW Player's Player 2022: Yasmin Clydsdale & Tamika Upton
- Harvey Norman NSW Women's Player of the Year 2022: Caitlan Johnston
- Harvey Norman NSW Women's Players' Player 2022: Caitlan Johnston
- NRLW Rookie of the Year 2022: Jesse Southwell
- NRLW Gladiator of the Year 2022: Caitlan Johnston
- NRLW Community Player of the Year 2022: Millie Boyle
- Thrive Award 2022: Caitlan Johnston
