= List of Newcastle Knights Women's players =

This article lists all rugby league footballers who have played first-grade for the Newcastle Knights in the NRL Women's Premiership.

NOTES:

- Debut:
  - Players are listed in the order of their debut game with the club.
  - Players that debuted in the same game are added alphabetically.
- Appearances: Newcastle Knights games only, not a total of their career games.
- Previous Club: refers to the previous first-grade rugby league club (NRLW or Super League) the player played at and does not refer to any junior club, Rugby Union club or a rugby league club she was signed to but never played at.
- Current players are indicated in bold text for their Knights career years.
- The statistics in this table are correct as of the 2026 NRL Women's season.

== List of players ==
Cap no.	Name	Nationality	Knights career	Debut round	Previous club	Position	Appearances	Tries	Goals	Field goals	Points	Age of debut
1.	Rangimarie Edwards-Bruce	(New Zealand)	2021	Rd. 1	Debut	Second-row	5	0	0	0	0	24
2.	Jayme Fressard	(Australia)	2021	Rd. 1	Brisbane Broncos	Centre	4	1	0	0	4	24
3.	Katie Green	(Australia)	2021	Rd. 1	Debut	Wing	3	0	0	0	0	25
4.	Caitlan Johnston-Green	(Australia)	2021–24	Rd. 1	Sydney Roosters	Prop	20	4	0	0	16	21
5.	Bobbi Law	(Australia)	2021–22	Rd. 1	Sydney Roosters	Centre	11	1	0	0	4	24
6.	Annetta Nu'uausala	(New Zealand)	2021	Rd. 1	New Zealand Warriors	Prop	5	1	0	0	4	27
7.	Georgia Page	(Australia)	2021	Rd. 1	St. George Illawarra Dragons	Second-row	4	0	0	0	0	26
8.	Charntay Poko	(New Zealand)	2021	Rd. 1	New Zealand Warriors	Lock	5	0	2	0	4	26
9.	Krystal Rota	(New Zealand)	2021	Rd. 1	New Zealand Warriors	Hooker	4	0	0	0	0	36
10.	Autumn-Rain Stephens-Daly	(New Zealand)	2021–22	Rd. 1	Debut	Wing	8	3	0	0	12	25
11.	Romy Teitzel	(Australia)	2021–22	Rd. 1	Brisbane Broncos	Second-row	12	5	0	0	20	23
12.	Tahlulah Tillett	(Australia)	2021	Rd. 1	Debut	Halfback	4	0	0	0	0	23
13.	Katelyn Vaha'akolo	(New Zealand)	2021	Rd. 1	Debut	Wing	5	1	0	0	4	21
14.	Charlotte Scanlan	(New Zealand)	2021	Rd. 1	Debut	Prop	5	0	0	0	0	33
15.	Emma Manzelmann	(Australia)	2021–22	Rd. 1	Debut	Hooker	12	2	0	0	8	20
16.	Phoebe Desmond	(Australia)	2021	Rd. 1	Debut	Prop	4	1	0	0	4	31
17.	Kirra Dibb	(Australia)	**2021–22, 2026–**	Rd. 1	New Zealand Warriors	Five-eighth	24	3	61	0	134	24
18.	Maitua Feterika	(New Zealand) (Samoa) (Australia)	2021	Rd. 2	St. George Illawarra Dragons	Prop	3	1	0	0	4	29
19.	Ngatokotoru Arakua	(Cook Islands) (New Zealand)	2021	Rd. 2	St. George Illawarra Dragons	Prop	2	0	0	0	0	24
20.	Kararaina Wira-Kohu	(New Zealand)	2021	Rd. 4	Debut	Prop	1	0	0	0	0	30
21.	Kyra Simon	(Australia)	2021–22	Rd. 4	Debut	Prop	4	0	0	0	0	19
22.	Paige Parker	(Australia)	2021	Rd. 5	Debut	Centre	1	1	0	0	4	26
23.	Shannon Evans	(Australia)	2021	Rd. 5	Debut	Hooker	1	0	0	0	0	28
24.	Chantelle Graham	(Australia)	2021	Rd. 5	Debut	Lock	1	0	0	0	0	26
25.	Millie Boyle	(Australia)	2022	Rd. 1	Brisbane Broncos	Prop	7	1	0	0	4	24
26.	Yasmin Meakes	(Australia)	**2022–**	Rd. 1	Sydney Roosters	Second-row	44	12	0	0	48	28
27.	Olivia Higgins	(Australia)	**2022–**	Rd. 1	Sydney Roosters	Hooker	52	16	0	0	64	29
28.	Shanice Parker	(Australia) (New Zealand)	**2022–**	Rd. 1	Sydney Roosters	Centre	53	15	0	0	60	24
29.	Hannah Southwell	(Australia)	2022–24	Rd. 1	Sydney Roosters	Lock	19	3	0	0	12	23
30.	Jesse Southwell	(Australia)	2022–25	Rd. 1	Debut	Halfback	40	7	102	0	232	17
31.	Kiana Takairangi	(Australia) (New Zealand) (Cook Islands)	2022	Rd. 1	Sydney Roosters	Wing	6	4	0	0	16	30
32.	Tamika Upton	(Australia)	2022–24	Rd. 1	Brisbane Broncos	Fullback	26	19	0	0	76	25
33.	Tayla Predebon	(Australia)	**2022–**	Rd. 1	Sydney Roosters	Prop	49	10	0	0	40	21
34.	Simone Karpani	(Australia)	**2022–**	Rd. 1	Sydney Roosters	Prop	35	2	0	0	8	25
35.	Makenzie Weale	(Australia)	2022	Rd. 2	Debut	Second-row	4	1	0	0	4	20
36.	Jakiya Whitfeld	(Australia)	2022	Rd. 3	Debut	Wing	2	0	0	0	0	21
37.	Tiana Davison	(Australia)	**2022–23, 2025–**	Rd. 3	Debut	Prop	32	5	0	0	20	21
38.	Caitlin Moran	(Australia)	2022–23	Rd. 3	Debut	Five-eighth	7	0	0	0	0	25
39.	Emmanita Paki	(Australia)	2022	Rd. 4	Debut	Wing	4	2	0	0	8	19
40.	Jessica Gentle	(Australia)	2022	Rd. 5	Debut	Wing	1	1	0	0	4	26
41.	Kayla Romaniuk	(Australia)	**2022–**	Rd. 5	Debut	Lock	48	6	0	0	24	20
42.	Laishon Albert-Jones	(New Zealand)	2023–24	Rd. 1	Debut	Lock	20	3	0	0	12	25
43.	Rima Butler	(Australia)	2023–24	Rd. 1	Parramatta Eels	Prop	15	2	0	0	8	25
44.	Sheridan Gallagher	(Australia)	2023–25	Rd. 1	Debut	Wing	32	25	7	0	114	21
45.	Abigail Roache	(New Zealand)	2023–24	Rd. 1	Debut	Centre	20	9	0	0	36	22
46.	Jasmin Strange	(Australia)	2023	Rd. 1	Sydney Roosters	Wing	11	4	0	0	16	20
47.	Nita Maynard	(New Zealand)	2023–24	Rd. 1	Brisbane Broncos	Hooker	19	0	0	0	0	31
48.	Viena Tinao	(Australia)	2023–25	Rd. 1	Debut	Prop	15	0	0	0	0	20
49.	Georgia Roche	(England)	**2023–**	Rd. 3	Leeds Rhinos	Five-eighth	42	10	4	0	48	22
50.	Felila Kia	(Australia)	2023	Rd. 4	Debut	Second-row	3	0	0	0	0	19
51.	Jacinta Carter	(Australia)	2023–24	Rd. 8	Debut	Prop	3	0	0	0	0	19
52.	Grace Kukutai	(New Zealand)	2024–25	Rd. 1	Debut	Prop	11	0	0	0	0	27
53.	Isabella Waterman	(New Zealand)	2024	Rd. 1	Debut	Wing	2	0	0	0	0	24
54.	Lilly-Ann White	(Australia)	**2024–**	Rd. 2	Debut	Wing	12	6	0	0	24	18
55.	Tenika Willison	(New Zealand)	**2024–**	Rd. 4	Debut	Centre	31	10	0	0	40	26
56.	Evie Jones	(Australia)	**2024–**	Rd. 5	Debut	Halfback	4	2	0	0	8	19
57.	Evah McEwen	(Australia)	2024–25	Rd. 9	Debut	Second-row	11	4	0	0	16	18
58.	Jules Kirkpatrick	(Australia)	**2025–**	Rd. 1	Debut	Second-row	22	3	0	0	12	21
59.	Joeli Morris	(Australia)	**2025–**	Rd. 1	Sydney Roosters	Hooker	4	0	0	0	0	23
60.	Botille Vette-Welsh	(New Zealand) (Australia)	**2025–**	Rd. 1	Wests Tigers	Fullback	17	1	0	0	4	28
61.	Sienna Yeo	(Australia)	**2025–**	Rd. 1	Debut	Second-row	25	4	0	0	16	20
62.	Tess Staines	(Australia)	2025	Rd. 3	Wests Tigers	Wing	6	4	0	0	16	23
63.	Grace Giampino	(Australia)	**2025–**	Rd. 9	Debut	Prop	8	0	0	0	0	21
64.	Fane Finau	(Tonga)	**2025–**	Rd. 10	Debut	Second-row	14	6	0	0	24	19
65.	Mercedez Taulelei-Siala	(New Zealand)	**2025–**	Rd. 11	Debut	Wing	13	14	0	0	56	18
66.	Keighley Simpson	(New Zealand)	2025	Rd. 11	Debut	Wing	3	4	0	0	16	20
67.	Amelia Pasikala	(New Zealand)	**2026–**	Rd. 1	Canberra Raiders	Prop	11	2	0	0	8	22
68.	Sidney Taylor	(Australia)	**2026–**	Rd. 1	Debut	Centre	12	5	0	0	20	23
69.	Lucy Spain	(Australia)	**2026–**	Rd. 2	Debut	Fullback	11	2	0	0	8	24
70.	Cheyelle Robins-Reti	(New Zealand)	**2026–**	Rd. 6	Canberra Raiders	Wing	1	0	0	0	0	29
71.	Charley Lahmert	(New Zealand)	**2026–**	Rd. 8	Debut	Hooker	5	2	0	0	8	19
72.	Emily McArthur	(Australia)	**2026–**	Rd. 8	Debut	Prop	5	0	0	0	0	18
73.	Stella Lewis	(Australia)	**2026–**	Finals Week 1	Debut	Second-row	1	0	0	0	0	18

== See also ==
- List of Newcastle Knights players
