= Hagiga Mosby =

Australian rugby league footballer (born 2000)

Personal information
- Born: 12 June 2000 (age 25); Thursday Island, Queensland, Australia
- Height: 163 cm (5 ft 4 in)
- Weight: 72 kg (11 st 5 lb)

Playing information

Rugby union
Club
| Years | Team | Pld | T | G | FG | P |
|---|---|---|---|---|---|---|
| 2020 | Queensland Reds |

Rugby league
- Position: Wing
Club
| Years | Team | Pld | T | G | FG | P |
|---|---|---|---|---|---|---|
| 2021– | Brisbane Broncos | 1 | 1 | 0 | 0 | 4 |
- Source: RLP As of 11 March 2022
- Relatives: Gideon Gela-Mosby (uncle)

Hagiga Mosby (born 12 June 2000) is an Australian rugby league footballer who plays as a winger for the Brisbane Broncos in the NRL Women's Premiership.

She previously played rugby union for the Queensland Reds in the Super W.

== Background ==
Born on Thursday Island, Mosby played for the North Queensland Cowboys NRL Touch Premiership team in 2018 before switching to rugby union. Her uncle, Gideon Gela-Mosby, played three seasons with the Cowboys in the NRL.

== Playing career ==
In 2019, Mosby played for the University of Queensland at the AON Uni sevens competition and represented Australia at the 2019 Oceania Women's Sevens Championship. In 2020, she joined the Queensland Reds in the Super W.

In December 2021, Mosby switched to rugby league, signing with the Brisbane Broncos.

In Round 2 of the 2021 NRL Women's season, Mosby made her debut for the Broncos, scoring a try in a win over the Newcastle Knights.
