= Pasami Saulo =

NZ Maori & Samoa international rugby league footballer

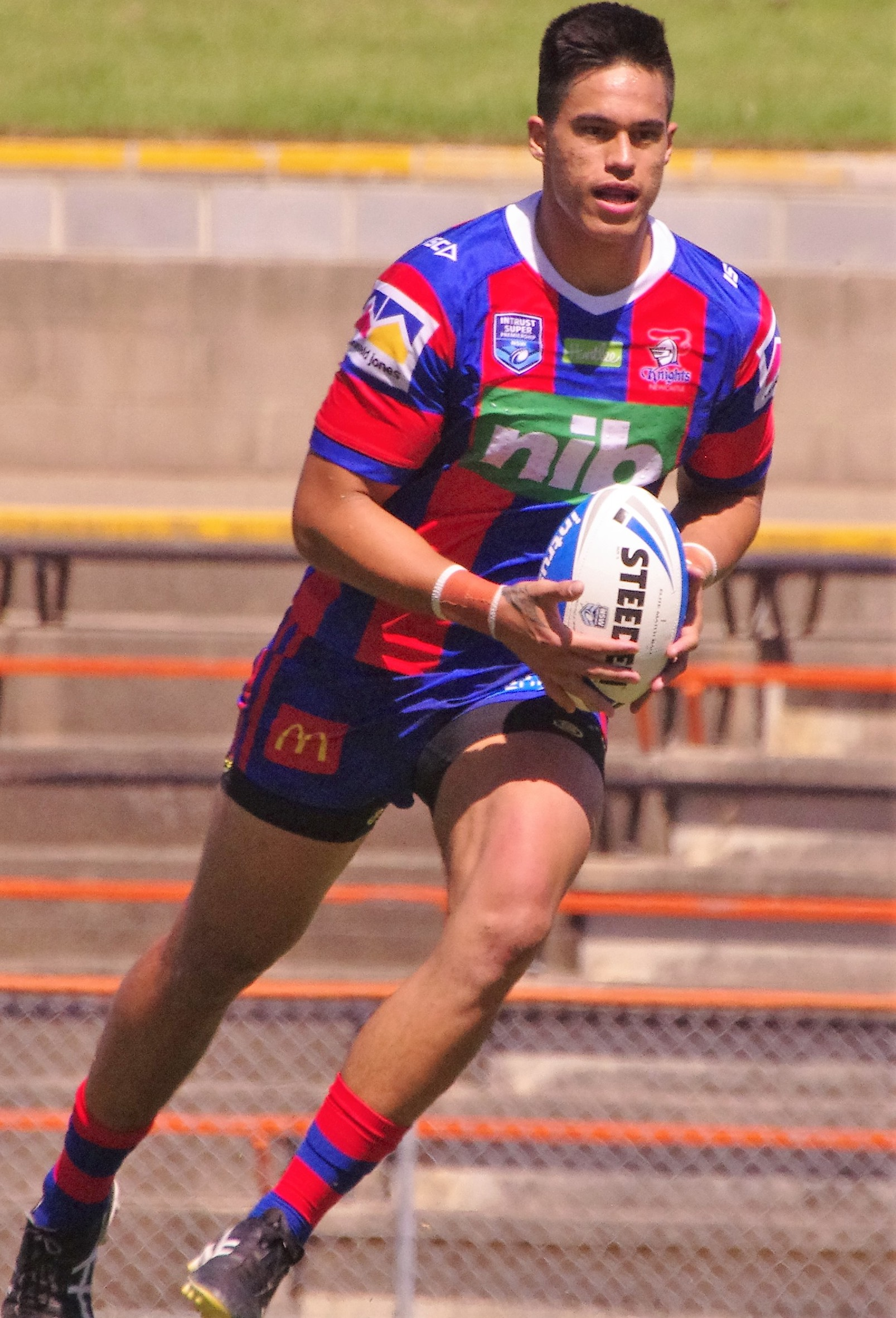

Personal information
- Born: 1 August 1998 (age 28) Belmont, New South Wales, Australia
- Height: 190 cm (6 ft 3 in)
- Weight: 111 kg (17 st 7 lb)

Playing information
- Position: Prop
Club
Years	Team	Pld	T	G	FG	P
2018–22	Newcastle Knights	27	0	0	0	0
2023–25	Canberra Raiders	30	0	0	0	0
2026–	Newcastle Knights	18	0	0	0	0
	Total	75	0	0	0	0
Representative
Years	Team	Pld	T	G	FG	P
2020	Māori All Stars	1	0	0	0	0
2026	Samoa	0	0	0	0	0
- Source: As of 22 November 2026

Pasami Saulo (born 1 August 1998) is a professional rugby league footballer who plays as a prop for the Newcastle Knights in the National Rugby League (NRL) and Samoa.

He previously played for the Canberra Raiders in the NRL.

== Background ==
Saulo was born in Belmont, New South Wales, Australia.

He played his junior rugby league for Fairfield United and the Maitland Pickers, before being signed by the Newcastle Knights. He is of Samoan and Māori descent.

== Playing career ==
=== Early years ===
In July 2016, Saulo played for the Australian Schoolboys. From 2016 to 2017, he played for the Newcastle Knights' National Youth Competition team. In November 2017, he re-signed with the Knights on a 2-year contract until the end of 2020.

=== 2018 ===
In 2018, Saulo played some games for Newcastle in the new Jersey Flegg Cup competition, but mostly appeared in their Intrust Super Premiership NSW side. In round 22 of the 2018 NRL season, Saulo became the 300th player to play NRL for the Newcastle club, after making his debut against the New Zealand Warriors, playing off the interchange bench.

=== 2019 ===
Saulo played three games for Newcastle in the 2019 NRL season as the club finished 11th on the table.

=== 2020 ===
Saulo played seven games for Newcastle in the 2020 NRL season as the club qualified for the finals. Saulo did not play in Newcastle's finals campaign which ended in the first week after they were eliminated by South Sydney.

=== 2021 ===
Saulo was limited to only three appearances for Newcastle in the 2021 NRL season. He did not play in Newcastle's elimination final loss to Parramatta.

=== 2022 ===
Following the conclusion of the 2022 NRL season, Saulo signed a two-year deal to join Canberra ahead of the 2023 NRL season.

=== 2023 ===
Saulo played a total of 22 matches for Canberra in 2023 as the club finished 8th on the table and qualified for the finals. Saulo played in Canberra's 30-28 elimination finals loss to Newcastle.

=== 2024 ===
Saulo was limited to only eight matches with Canberra in the 2024 NRL season as the club finished 9th on the table.

=== 2025 ===
On 30 July, the Newcastle club announced that Saulo had agreed to terms and had signed with them until 2027.

=== 2026 ===
Saulo played 18 games for Newcastle in the 2026 NRL season including their 2026 NRL Grand Final loss to the Sydney Roosters.

== Statistics ==
Year	Team	Games	Tries	Pts
2018	Newcastle Knights	3		
2019	Newcastle Knights	3		
2020	Newcastle Knights	7		
2021	Newcastle Knights	3		
2022	Newcastle Knights	11		
2023	Canberra Raiders	22		
2024	Canberra Raiders	8		
2024	Canberra Raiders	1		
2026	Newcastle Knights	10		
2027	Newcastle Knights			
	Totals	67		

*denotes season competing
