= Shannon Evans (rugby league) =

Australian rugby league player

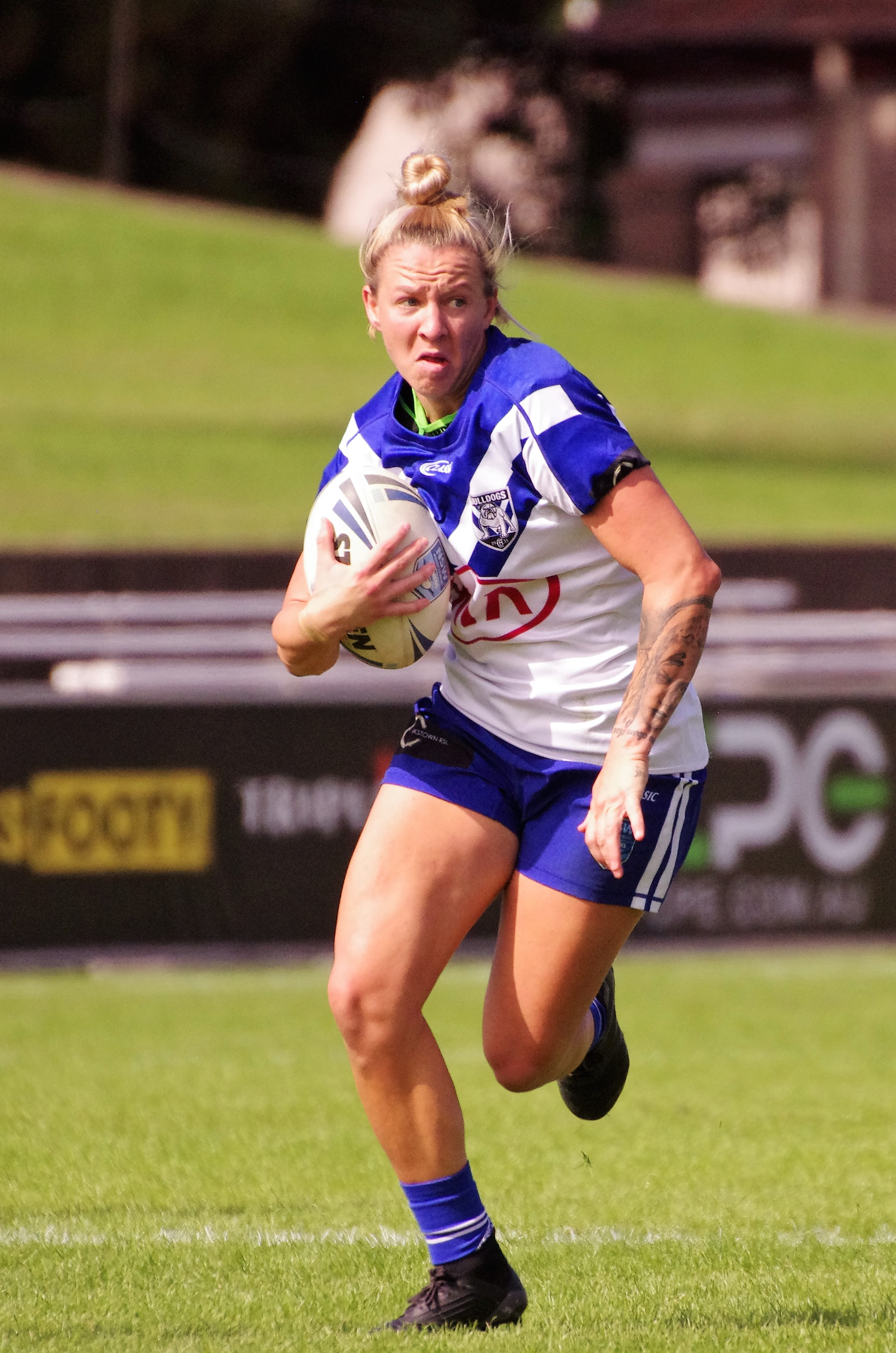

Personal information
- Born: 16 December 1993 (age 31) Newcastle, New South Wales, Australia
- Height: 171 cm (5 ft 7 in)
- Weight: 71 kg (11 st 3 lb)

Playing information
- Position: Fullback, Five-eighth, Hooker
Club
Years	Team	Pld	T	G	FG	P
2021	Newcastle Knights	1	0	0	0	0
- Source: As of 9 August 2022

Shannon Evans (born 16 December 1993) is an Australian professional rugby league footballer. Her positions are fullback, five-eighth and hooker. She previously played for the Newcastle Knights in the NRL Women's Premiership.

== Background ==
Evans was born in Newcastle, New South Wales. She joined the Australian Navy as a 19-year old.

== Playing career ==
=== Early years ===
As an 18-year old, Evans played for the Maitland Women's team. In 2018, she played for the Australian Defence Force representative side. In 2019, she played for the Canterbury-Bankstown Bulldogs in the NSWRL Women's Premiership. In 2021, she played for the Central Coast Roosters and represented the Australian Defence Force side again.

=== 2022 ===
In February, Evans joined the Newcastle Knights' inaugural NRLW squad. In round 5 of the delayed 2021 NRL Women's season, she made her NRLW debut for the Knights against the Gold Coast Titans. She played in 1 match for the Knights, before parting ways with the club at the end of the season.
