= Chantelle Graham =

Australian rugby league footballer

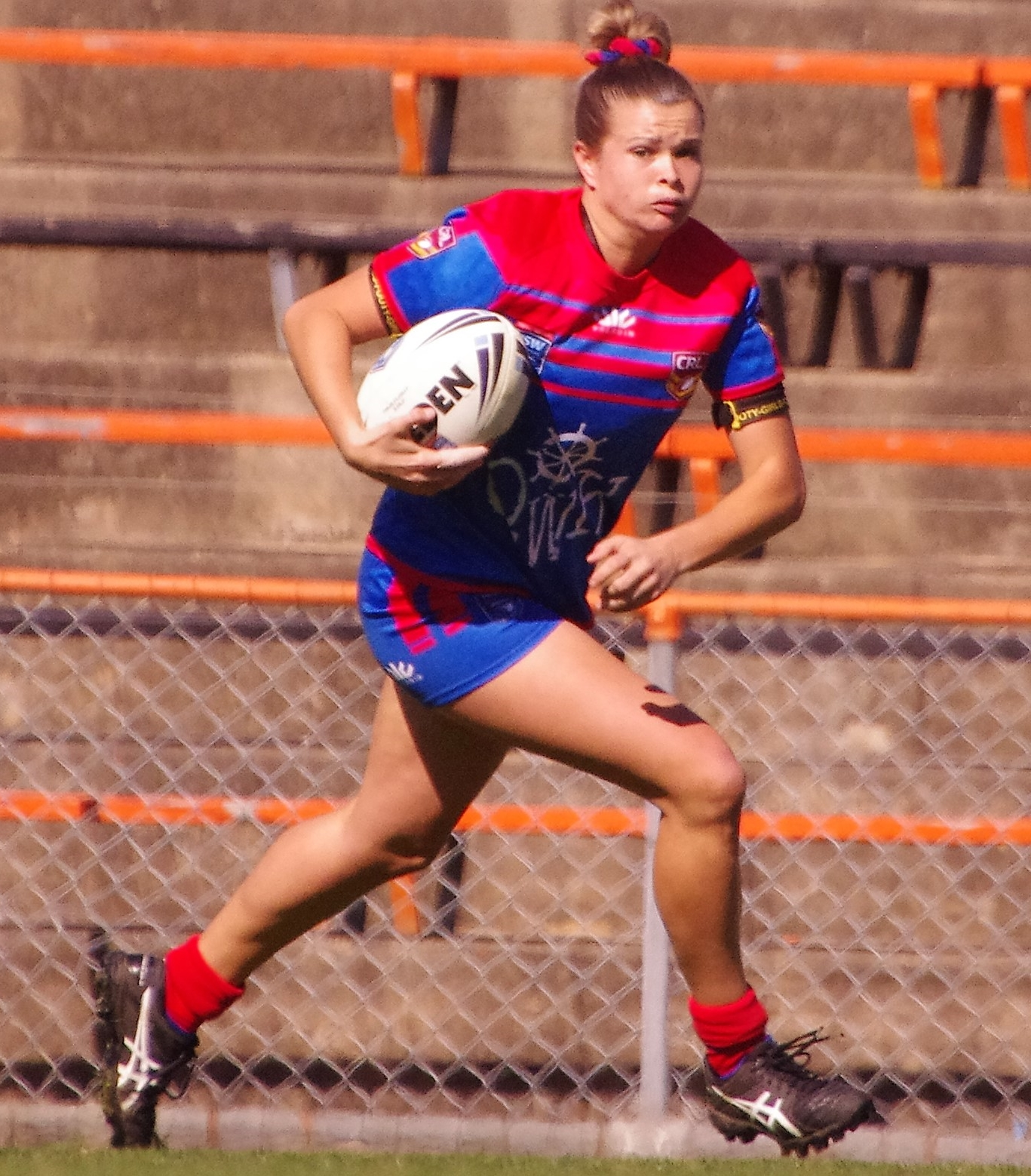

Personal information
- Born: 25 November 1995 (age 29) Newcastle, New South Wales, Australia
- Height: 168 cm (5 ft 6 in)
- Weight: 72 kg (11 st 5 lb)

Playing information
- Position: Second-row, Lock
Club
Years	Team	Pld	T	G	FG	P
2021	Newcastle Knights	1	0	0	0	0
- Source: As of 9 August 2022

Chantelle Graham (born 25 November 1995) is an Australian professional rugby league footballer. Her positions are second-row and lock. She previously played for the Newcastle Knights in the NRL Women's Premiership.

== Background ==
Graham was born in Newcastle, New South Wales. She grew up playing league tag, touch football and Oztag.

== Playing career ==
=== Early years ===
In 2015, Graham played for the Wyong Roos league tag team. In 2017 and 2018, she played for the South Newcastle Lions in the Newcastle Rugby League. She also spent time playing for the Aberglasslyn Ants. In 2019, she represented the CRL Newcastle and Central Coast Roosters sides. In 2020, she represented the Newcastle and Hunter side in the Women's Country Championships. In 2021, she played for the Newcastle Maitland Region Knights representative side. In November 2021, she joined the Newcastle Knights' inaugural NRLW squad. In December 2021, she received the Country Women's Player of the Year award.

=== 2022 ===
In round 5 of the delayed 2021 NRL Women's season, Graham made her NRLW debut for the Knights against the Gold Coast Titans. She played in 1 match for the Knights, before parting ways with the club at the end of the season.
