= Kaitlyn Phillips =

Australian rugby league footballer

Personal information
- Born: 9 July 1997 (age 28); Orange, New South Wales, Australia
- Height: 172 cm (5 ft 8 in)
- Weight: 68 kg (10 st 10 lb)

Playing information
- Position: Second-row
Club
| Years | Team | Pld | T | G | FG | P |
|---|---|---|---|---|---|---|
| 2020 | Sydney Roosters | 2 | 0 | 0 | 0 | 0 |
| 2021–22 | Brisbane Broncos | 7 | 1 | 0 | 0 | 4 |
| 2023– | Gold Coast Titans | 3 | 0 | 0 | 0 | 0 |
| | Total | 12 | 1 | 0 | 0 | 4 |
Representative
| Years | Team | Pld | T | G | FG | P |
| 2019 | Prime Minister's XIII | 1 | 0 | 0 | 0 | 0 |
| 2020–21 | Indigenous All Stars | 2 | 0 | 0 | 0 | 0 |
- Source: RLP As of 1 November 2023

Kaitlyn Phillips (born 9 July 1997) is an Australian rugby league footballer who plays as a second-row for the Gold Coast Titans Women in the NRL Women's Premiership and the Tweed Heads Seagulls in the QRL Women's Premiership.

== Background ==
Phillips was born in Orange, New South Wales and began playing rugby league for the Orange Hawks in 2018. She is of Indigenous Australian descent.

== Playing career ==
In 2019, Phillips joined Mounties RLFC in the NSWRL Women's Premiership. In May 2019, she represented NSW Country at the Women's National Championships. On 11 October 2019, she represented the Prime Minister's XIII in their win over Fiji.

In 2020, Phillips moved to the Tweed Heads Seagulls in the QRL Women's Premiership. On 22 February 2020, she started at second-row for the Indigenous All Stars.

On 22 September 2020, Phillips joined the Sydney Roosters NRL Women's Premiership team. In Round 1 of the 2020 NRLW season, she made her debut for the Roosters in their 18–4 win over the St. George Illawarra Dragons.

On 20 February 2021, she represented the Indigenous All Stars in their 24–0 loss to the Māori All Stars.
