= Adam Clune =

Australian rugby league footballer

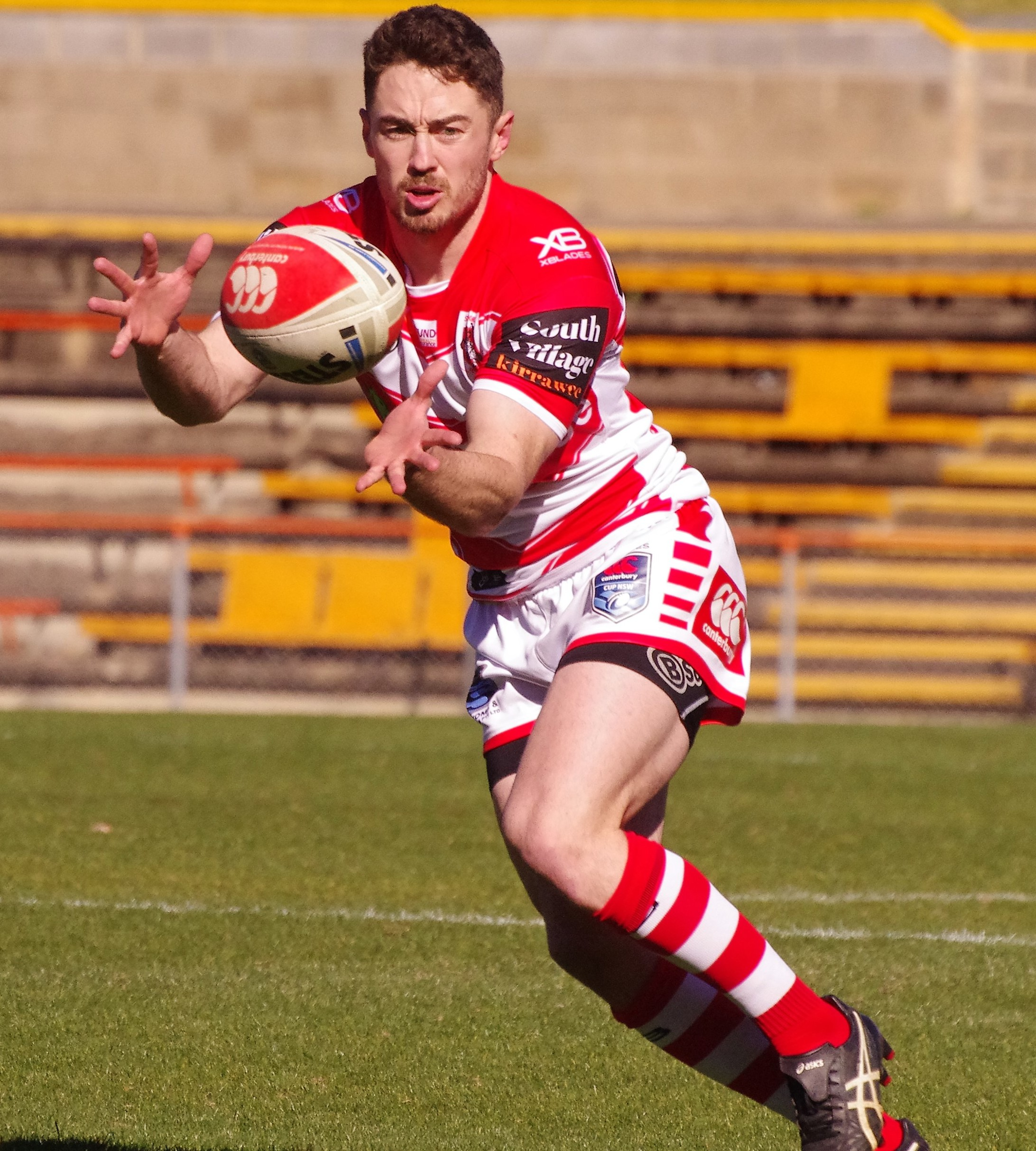

Personal information
- Born: 8 June 1995 (age 31) Orange, New South Wales, Australia
- Height: 5 ft 8 in (1.73 m)
- Weight: 13 st 3 lb (84 kg)

Playing information
- Position: Scrum-half
Club
Years	Team	Pld	T	G	FG	P
2020–21	St. George Illawarra	25	1	0	0	4
2022–23	Newcastle Knights	22	3	0	1	13
2024–	Huddersfield Giants	44	6	0	0	24
	Total	91	10	0	1	41
- Source: As of 20 October 2026

Adam Clune (born 8 June 1995) is a professional rugby league footballer who plays as a scrum-half for the Huddersfield Giants in the Super League. He was named as Giants captain for the 2026 Super League season

He previously played for the St. George Illawarra Dragons and Newcastle Knights in the National Rugby League (NRL).

== Background ==
Clune played his junior rugby league for the Junee Diesels, Albion Park-Oak Flats Eagles and Western Suburbs Red Devils.

== Playing career ==
=== 2020 ===
Clune made his debut in round 4 of the 2020 NRL season for St. George Illawarra against the Canterbury-Bankstown Bulldogs.

He played 15 games for the club in his debut season as they finished 13th on the table and missed out on the finals.

=== 2021 ===
Clune scored his first NRL try in round 1 of the 2021 NRL season against local rivals Cronulla-Sutherland.

In August, he signed a two-year contract with the Newcastle Knights starting in 2022.

Clune played a total of 10 matches for St. George Illawarra in the 2021 NRL season as the club finished 11th on the table and missed out on the finals.

=== 2022 ===
Clune played a total of 18 matches for Newcastle in the 2022 NRL season as the club finished 14th on the table and missed the finals.

=== 2023 ===
In 2023, after spending most of the year in the NSW Cup, Clune was called into the Knights NRL team for the last three weeks of the season, replacing Jackson Hastings due to injury. Clune played in the Knights' 10–40 loss to New Zealand Warriors in week two of the finals. He parted ways with the club at the end of the 2023 season.

On 26 October, it was reported that he had joined the Huddersfield Giants for 2024 on a three-year contract.

=== 2024 ===
Clune played 26 games for Huddersfield in the 2024 Super League season as the club had a difficult campaign finishing 9th on the table, despite this clune had 8 assists and 4 tries to record his most consistent season to date.

=== 2025 ===
Clune played only six matches for Huddersfield in the 2025 Super League season as the club finished 10th on the table.

== Statistics ==
Year	Team	App	T	G	DG	Pts
2020	St. George Illawarra Dragons	15	0	0	0	0
2021	St. George Illawarra Dragons	10	1	0	0	4
2022	Newcastle Knights	18	2	0	0	8
2023	Newcastle Knights	4	1	0	1	0
2024	Huddersfield Giants	26	4	0	0	16
2025	Huddersfield Giants	6				
2026	Huddersfield Giants	11	2			8
	Totals	91	10	0	1	41
