= Kararaina Wira-Kohu =

New Zealand rugby league football player

Personal information
- Born: 9 March 1992 (age 33) Te Tai Tokerau (Whangārei), New Zealand
- Height: 172 cm (5 ft 8 in)
- Weight: 105 kg (16 st 7 lb)

Playing information
- Position: Prop
Club
| Years | Team | Pld | T | G | FG | P |
|---|---|---|---|---|---|---|
| 2021 | Newcastle Knights | 1 | 0 | 0 | 0 | 0 |
Representative
| Years | Team | Pld | T | G | FG | P |
| 2017–22 | NZ Māori Ferns | 4 | 1 | 0 | 0 | 4 |
| 2020 | New Zealand | 1 | 0 | 0 | 0 | 0 |
- Source: As of 9 August 2022

Kararaina Wira-Kohu (born 9 March 1992) is a New Zealand professional rugby league footballer. Her position is prop. She previously played for the Newcastle Knights in the NRL Women's Premiership.

== Background ==
Born in Te Tai Tokerau (Whangārei), New Zealand, Wira-Kohu is of Māori descent.

== Playing career ==
=== Early years ===
Wira-Kohu played for the Papakura Sisters, before moving to the Manurewa Marlins in 2017, also playing for the Northern Swords that season. Later that year she played for the New Zealand Māori Ferns against the Indigenous All Stars. In 2018, she represented the Auckland women's rugby league team and was named in the New Zealand Māori Ferns squad again. In 2019, she returned to Papakura, represented the Counties Manukau Stingrays and played for the Northland Kauri rugby union side in the Farah Palmer Cup. She continued to represent the New Zealand Māori Ferns in both 2019 and 2020. In 2020, she played for the New Zealand Kiwi Ferns against the Fetū Samoa invitational side. In December 2021, she signed with the Newcastle Knights to be a part of their inaugural NRLW squad.

=== 2022 ===
In round 4 of the delayed 2021 NRL Women's season, Wira-Kohu made her NRLW debut for the Knights against the St. George Illawarra Dragons. She played in 1 match for the Knights, before parting ways with the club at the end of the season.
