= Casey Bromilow =

Australian rugby league player and coach

Personal information
- Born: 12 February 1984 (age 42) Brisbane, Queensland, Australia

Playing information
- Position: Halfback, Hooker
Club
Years	Team	Pld	T	G	FG	P
2010	York City Knights	0	0	0	0	0

Coaching information
Club
Years	Team	Gms	W	D	L	W%
2021	Newcastle Knights Women	5	0	0	5	0
- Source: As of 3 November 2023

Casey Bromilow is an Australian professional rugby league football coach. He currently works for the Newcastle Knights and was the inaugural head coach of the NRL Women's Premiership side.

== Background ==
Bromilow is of English descent.

== Playing career ==
Early in his career, Bromilow played rugby league as a halfback and hooker, having stints in Queensland and England, most notably with the Redcliffe Dolphins in the Queensland Cup, and York City Knights in Championship One. After his playing career, Bromilow moved into rugby league administration roles.

=== York City Knights ===
On 13 Jan 2010 it was reported that he had signed for York City Knights in the RFL Championship

== Coaching career ==
=== Newcastle Knights ===
In 2018, Bromilow joined the Newcastle Knights as team manager of their Tarsha Gale Cup side. In 2019, he moved into the role of club Elite Pathway Programs Manager. At the end of 2020, he was announced as the head coach of the Tarsha Gale Cup team. In November 2021, he was announced as the head coach of the Knights' inaugural NRLW team. Ahead of the 2022 NRLW season, he was appointed the Knights' Elite Pathways Program Manager, with Ronald Griffiths replacing him as NRLW head coach.
