= Krystal Rota =

NZ international women's rugby league footballer

Personal information
- Born: 3 October 1985 (age 40) Auckland, New Zealand
- Height: 172 cm (5 ft 8 in)
- Weight: 77 kg (12 st 2 lb)

Playing information
- Position: Hooker
Club
Years	Team	Pld	T	G	FG	P
2018–19	New Zealand Warriors	6	0	0	0	0
2021	Newcastle Knights	4	0	0	0	0
2026	Manurewa Marlins	1	1	0	0	4
	Total	11	1	0	0	4
Representative
Years	Team	Pld	T	G	FG	P
2015–19	New Zealand	15	2	0	0	8
2019–22	Māori All Stars	3	1	0	0	4
2019	New Zealand 9s	4	2	0	0	8
- Source: RLP As of 14 November 2022

Krystal Rota (born 3 October 1985) is a New Zealand rugby league footballer.

She previously played for the New Zealand Warriors and Newcastle Knights in the NRL Women's Premiership.

Primarily a hooker, she is a New Zealand international.

== Background ==
Born in Auckland, Rota began playing rugby league for the Manurewa Marlins when she was 17.

== Playing career ==
In 2008, Rota was selected in the New Zealand train-on squad for the 2008 Women's Rugby League World Cup but was not selected in the final squad.

In 2015, Rota returned to rugby league after a three-year break. On 3 May 2015, she made her debut for New Zealand, coming off the bench in a 14–22 loss to Australia. On 6 May 2016, she started at hooker for New Zealand in their 26–16 win over Australia.

In 2017, Rota represented New Zealand at the 2017 Women's Rugby League World Cup. On 2 December 2017, she started at hooker in New Zealand's final loss to Australia.

On 31 July 2018, she joined the New Zealand Warriors NRL Women's Premiership team. In Round 1 of the 2018 NRL Women's season, she made her debut for the Warriors in their 10–4 win over the Sydney Roosters.

On 15 February 2019, Rota captained the Māori All Stars and scored a try in their 8–4 win over the Indigenous All Stars. In October 2019, she was a member of New Zealand's 2019 Rugby League World Cup 9s-winning squad.

On 22 February 2020, she captained the Māori All Stars in their 4–10 loss to the Indigenous All Stars. Rota withdrew from the 2020 NRL Women's season due to family and work commitments.

On 1 December 2021, Rota signed with the Newcastle Knights to be a part of their inaugural NRLW squad. In February 2022, she was announced as one of the club captains.

In Round 1 of the delayed 2021 NRL Women's season, Rota made her club debut for the Knights against the Parramatta Eels. She played in 4 matches for the Knights, before parting ways with the club at the end of the season.

In October 2022, she was selected for the New Zealand squad at the delayed 2021 Women's Rugby League World Cup in England.
