= Bobbi Law =

Australian rugby league footballer (born 1997)

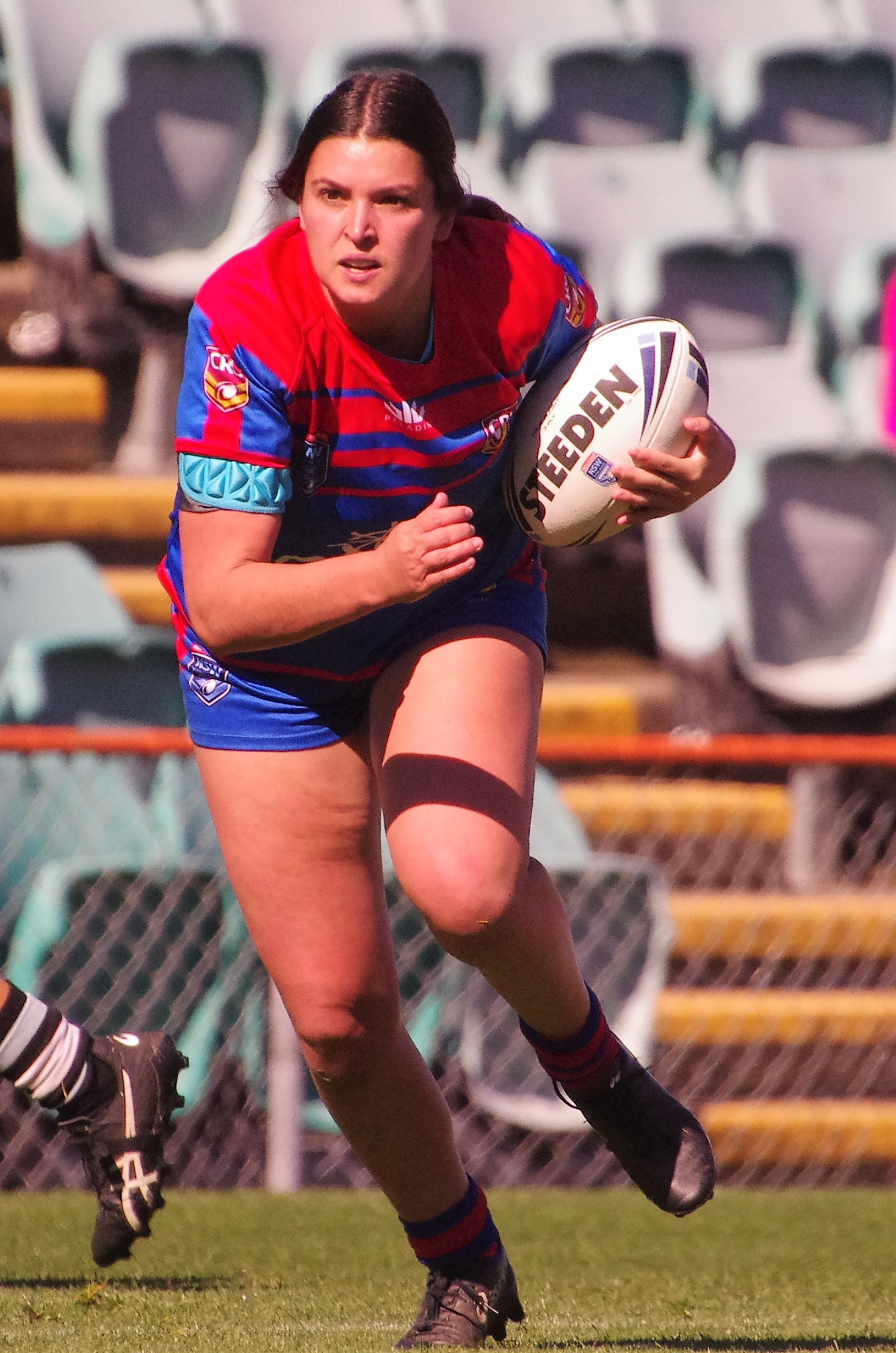
- Law in 2019

Personal information
- Born: 4 June 1997 (age 29) Newcastle, New South Wales, Australia
- Height: 159 cm (5 ft 3 in)
- Weight: 66 kg (10 st 6 lb)

Playing information
- Position: Centre, Wing
Club
Years	Team	Pld	T	G	FG	P
2019–20	Sydney Roosters	2	2	0	0	8
2021–22	Newcastle Knights	11	1	0	0	4
2023–25	St. George Illawarra Dragons	15	4	0	0	16
2026–	Canberra Raiders	8	3	0	0	12
	Total	36	10	0	0	40
Representative
Years	Team	Pld	T	G	FG	P
2019	Prime Minister's XIII	1	0	0	0	0
2022–25	Indigenous All Stars	4	0	0	0	0
- Source: RLP As of 2 November 2026

Bobbi Law (born 4 June 1997) is an Australian rugby league footballer who plays for the Canberra Raiders in the NRL Women's Premiership. Primarily a centre, she is a Prime Minister's XIII and Indigenous All Stars representative. She previously played for the NRL Women's Premiership sides Sydney Roosters Newcastle Knights, with whom she won the 2022 NRLW Grand Final with, and the St George Illawarra Dragons.

== Background ==
Law was born in Newcastle, New South Wales and played her junior rugby league for the Central Coast Roosters.

== Playing career ==
In 2019, Law played for CRL Newcastle in the NSWRL Women's Premiership, scoring a try in their 24–10 Grand Final win over Mounties RLFC. In May 2019, she represented NSW Country at the Women's National Championships.

In July 2019, she joined the Sydney Roosters Women NRL Women's Premiership team. In Round 3 of the 2019 NRL Women's season, she made her debut for the Roosters, scoring a try in their 16–24 loss to the St. George Illawarra Dragons Women. On 11 October 2019, she started at centre for the Prime Minister's XIII in their 22–14 win over the Fiji Prime Minister's XIII.

On 22 February 2020, she represented the Indigenous All Stars in their 10–4 over the Maori All Stars. On 27 September 2020, she started at five-eighth for the Central Coast Roosters in their 16–10 NSWRL Women's Premiership Grand Final win over the North Sydney Bears.

On 25 November 2021, Law signed with the Newcastle Knights Women to be a part of their inaugural NRLW squad.

In round 1 of the delayed 2021 NRL Women's season, Law made her club debut for the Knights against the Parramatta Eels.

On 2 October 2022, Law played in the Knights' 32-12 NRLW Grand Final win over the Parramatta Eels.

In March 2023, she signed with the St. George Illawarra Dragons.

In July 2023, Law made her club debut for the Dragons against her former club the Newcastle Knights.

In October 2023, Law signed a two-year extension with the Dragons, keeping her in red and white until the end of 2025.
