= Tahlulah Tillett =

Australian rugby league football player (born 1998)

Personal information
- Full name: Tahlulah Ava Tillett
- Born: 30 August 1998 (age 27) Cairns, Queensland, Australia
- Height: 176 cm (5 ft 9 in)
- Weight: 74 kg (11 st 9 lb)

Playing information
- Position: Halfback, Five-eighth
Club
Years	Team	Pld	T	G	FG	P
2021	Newcastle Knights	4	0	0	0	0
2023–25	Nth Qld Cowboys	23	0	0	0	0
	Total	27	0	0	0	0
Representative
Years	Team	Pld	T	G	FG	P
2017–23	Indigenous All Stars	3	0	0	0	0
- Source: As of 3 September 2025

Tahlulah Tillett (born 30 August 1998) is a retired Australian professional rugby league footballer.

A halfback and five-eighth, she played for the Newcastle Knights and North Queensland Cowboys in the NRL Women's Premiership.

== Background ==
Tahlulah Ava Tillett was born in Cairns, Queensland and is of Torres Strait Islander descent. She played touch football in her junior years, representing Queensland and Australia, as well as junior rugby league for the Cairns Kangaroos. Her father, Stephen, was a member of the inaugural North Queensland Cowboys squad in 1995, playing reserve grade for the club.

== Playing career ==
=== Early years ===
In 2017, Tillett represented the North Queensland Marlins women's team and Indigenous All Stars women's team. In 2018, she was named in the Australian women's national elite training squad for the upcoming NRLW competition. Three weeks later she played for the Wests Panthers, before rupturing the ACL in her right knee during her first game. In January 2020, she was a part of the Queensland Female Performance Program squad. In 2021, she played for the North Queensland Gold Stars in the BHP Premiership. In December 2021, she signed with the Newcastle Knights to be a part of their inaugural NRLW squad.

=== 2022 ===
In February, Tillett played for the Indigenous All Stars against the Māori All Stars. In round 1 of the delayed 2021 NRL Women's season, she made her NRLW debut for the Knights against the Parramatta Eels. She played in 4 matches for the Knights, before parting ways with the club at the end of the season.

=== 2023 ===
On 5 April, she became the second signing for the inaugural North Queensland Cowboys NRLW team.

In Round 4 of the 2023 NRL Women's season, after missing the first three rounds through injury, Tillett made her club debut for the Cowboys and set up two tries in their 16–12 win over the Wests Tigers.

=== 2024 ===
In May, Tillett started at halfback in the Mackay Cutters' QRLW Grand Final win over the Norths Devils.

In Round 1 of the 2024 NRL Women's season, she started at five-eighth in the Cowboys' 14–0 loss to the Cronulla Sharks. On 16 August, she re-signed with the Cowboys until the end of the 2025 season.

=== 2025 ===
Tillett retired following the 2025 NRL Women's season, taking up a coaching role with the Cowboys.
