= Georgia Page =

Australian rugby league player

Personal information
- Born: 21 March 1995 (age 31) Windsor, New South Wales, Australia
- Height: 169 cm (5 ft 7 in)
- Weight: 70 kg (11 st 0 lb)

Playing information

Rugby union
- Position: Prop
Club
Years	Team	Pld	T	G	FG	P
2019	Melbourne Rebels	4	0	0	0	0

Rugby league
- Position: Second-row
Club
Years	Team	Pld	T	G	FG	P
2020	St George Illawarra	2	0	0	0	0
2021	Newcastle Knights	4	0	0	0	0
	Total	6	0	0	0	0
- Source: As of 16 November 2023

Georgia Page (born 21 March 1995) is an Australian rugby league footballer who plays as a second-row. She previously played for the St George Illawarra Dragons and Newcastle Knights in the NRL Women's Premiership, Cronulla-Sutherland Sharks in the NSWRL Women's Premiership and played rugby union for the Melbourne Rebels in the Super W.

== Background ==
Born in Windsor, New South Wales, Page played track and field, tennis and basketball growing up before attending a rugby union talent identification day as a teenager. From there, she was offered a five-year scholarship to Lindenwood University in St. Charles, Missouri, where she played for their rugby union team.

== Playing career ==
=== Rugby union ===
After one year, Page returned to Australia and played rugby for Bond University. In 2019, she played for the Melbourne Rebels in the Super W.

=== Rugby league ===
In 2020, Page switched to rugby league, playing for the Cronulla-Sutherland Sharks in the NSWRL Women's Premiership.

On 23 September 2020, Page joined the St George Illawarra Dragons NRL Women's Premiership team. In Round 2 of the 2020 NRLW season, Page made her debut for the Dragons in an 18–4 loss to the Brisbane Broncos.

On 25 November 2021, Page signed with the Newcastle Knights to be a part of their inaugural NRLW squad.

In round 1 of the delayed 2021 NRL Women's season, Page made her club debut for the Knights against the Parramatta Eels. She played in 4 matches for the Knights, before parting ways with the club at the end of the season.
