= Jessica Gentle =

Australian rugby league player

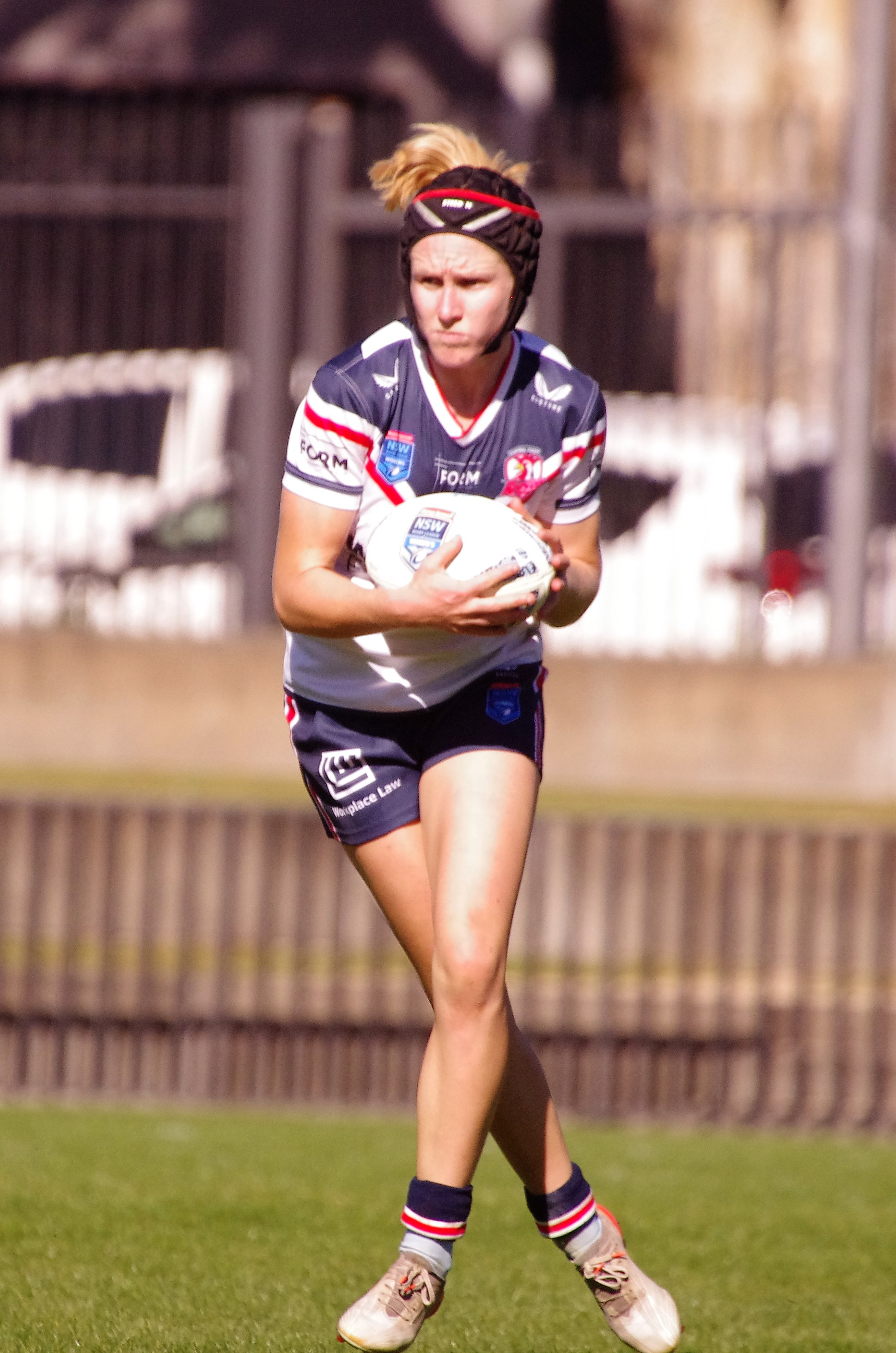

Personal information
- Born: 28 July 1996 (age 29) Coffs Harbour, New South Wales, Australia
- Height: 168 cm (5 ft 6 in)
- Weight: 64 kg (10 st 1 lb)

Playing information
- Position: Wing, Centre
Club
Years	Team	Pld	T	G	FG	P
2022	Newcastle Knights	1	1	0	0	4
2023–	Canberra Raiders	2	1	0	0	4
	Total	3	2	0	0	8
- Source: As of 1 November 2023

Jessica Gentle (born 28 July 1996) is an Australian professional rugby league footballer who currently plays for the Canberra Raiders in the NRL Women's Premiership. Her positions are wing and centre. She previously played for the Newcastle Knights.

== Background ==
Gentle was born in Coffs Harbour, New South Wales and attended Woolgoolga High School. She played soccer and rugby, and competed in cross country running and swimming. In soccer, she was a representative of the Australian Schoolgirls National team, was a part of the North Coast team where her team was the runner up in the State Youth League and earned a players' player award with the North Coast team in 2011 and 2014. She represented Northern NSW soccer at the National Youth Championships in 2010 and 2011 and was awarded the Pierre De Coubertina Award for sporting achievement in her senior year.

== Playing career ==
=== Early years ===
In 2015, Gentle travelled to the United States to play soccer for the Wyoming Cowgirls.

=== 2022 ===
In 2022, Gentle started playing rugby league for the Central Coast Roosters in the NSWRL Women's Premiership. In June, she played for the NSW Country side that beat Western Australia to win the Harvey Norman National Championships, scoring two tries. She later joined the Newcastle Knights' NRL Women's Premiership squad as a development player. In September, she won the Women's Country Championships Player of the Year award. Shortly afterwards, she was named in the extended squad for the Knights' round 5 2022 NRLW season clash with the St. George Illawarra Dragons, after having her contract upgraded to the top 24 squad. She subsequently made her NRLW debut for the Knights against the Dragons, scoring a try in the Knights' 30–8 win.

=== 2023 ===
In May, Gentle joined new NRLW side Canberra Raiders on a one-year contract.
