= Charntay Poko =

New Zealand rugby player

Personal information
- Born: 10 November 1995 (age 31) Auckland, New Zealand
- Height: 174 cm (5 ft 9 in)
- Weight: 91 kg (14 st 5 lb)

Playing information
- Position: Halfback, Lock
Club
Years	Team	Pld	T	G	FG	P
2019	New Zealand Warriors	3	1	0	0	4
2021	Newcastle Knights	5	0	2	0	4
	Total	8	1	2	0	8
Representative
Years	Team	Pld	T	G	FG	P
2019	New Zealand	2	0	4	0	8
2019	New Zealand 9s	2	0	0	0	0
- Source: RLP As of 9 August 2022

Rugby union career
- Position: Midfield Back
Provincial / State sides
Years	Team	Apps	(Points)
2013–2022	Canterbury	34	(65)
Super Rugby
Years	Team	Apps	(Points)
2023	Matatū	4	(0)

Charntay Poko (born 10 November 1995) is a New Zealand rugby league and union footballer. Primarily a halfback or lock, she is a New Zealand representative. She previously played for the New Zealand Warriors and Newcastle Knights in the NRL Women's Premiership.

== Background ==
Born in Auckland, Poko is of Cook Island descent.

== Rugby career ==
=== Rugby league ===
Poko played for the Papanui Tigers in the Canterbury Rugby League competition and represented Canterbury in both rugby league and rugby union. In 2016, she was named in the New Zealand wider squad.

In 2019, Poko began playing for the Richmond Roses in the Auckland Rugby League. On 22 June 2019, she made her debut for New Zealand, starting at five-eighth and kicking four goals in a 46–8 win over Samoa.

On 10 July 2019, Poko joined the New Zealand Warriors NRL Women's Premiership team. In Round 1 of the 2019 NRL Women's season, she made her debut for the Warriors, scoring a try in a 16–12 win over the Sydney Roosters.

In October 2019, she was a member of New Zealand's 2019 Rugby League World Cup 9s-winning squad.

On 1 December 2021, Poko signed with the Newcastle Knights to be a part of their inaugural NRLW squad.

In round 1 of the delayed 2021 NRL Women's season, Poko made her club debut for the Knights against the Parramatta Eels. She played in 5 matches for the Knights, before parting ways with the club at the end of the season.

=== Rugby union ===
Poko signed with Matatū in the Super Rugby Aupiki competition for the 2023 season.
