= Charlotte Scanlan =

New Zealand international rugby league football player (b.1988)

Personal information
- Born: 30 July 1988 (age 37); Wellington, New Zealand
- Height: 173 cm (5 ft 8 in)
- Weight: 81 kg (12 st 11 lb)

Playing information
- Position: Prop, Lock, Second-row
Club
Years	Team	Pld	T	G	FG	P
2021	Newcastle Knights	5	0	0	0	0
Representative
Years	Team	Pld	T	G	FG	P
2013–22	New Zealand	9	1	0	0	4
- Source: As of 14 November 2022

Charlotte Scanlan (born 30 July 1988) is a New Zealand professional rugby league footballer. Her positions are prop, lock and second-row. She previously played for the Newcastle Knights in the NRL Women's Premiership.

== Background ==
Born in Wellington, New Zealand, Scanlan is of Samoan descent. She played her junior rugby league for the Richmond Roses.

== Playing career ==
=== Early years ===
From the years 2007 to 2009, Scanlan played rugby union with Kia Toa RFC and Manawatu. In 2012, she played for the Richmond Roses and Akarana Falcons. She was selected in the Kiwi Ferns squad later that year. In 2013, she played for the Auckland NPC rugby union and rugby sevens sides. She then represented the Kiwi Ferns at the 2013 Women's Rugby League World Cup. In 2014, she was selected for the New Zealand women's sevens team to play at the 2014–15 World Rugby Women's Sevens Series, and was selected again in 2015. In 2016, she represented the Auckland Storm, Auckland women's sevens team and New Zealand women's sevens team again. In 2017, she moved to Japan to play rugby union and captained the Auckland women's sevens team. In 2020, she returned to the Kiwis Ferns squad. In December 2021, she signed with the Newcastle Knights to be a part of their inaugural NRLW squad.

=== 2022 ===
In Round 1 of the delayed 2021 NRL Women's season, Scanlan made her NRLW debut for the Knights against the Parramatta Eels. She played in 5 matches for the Knights, before parting ways with the club at the end of the season.

In October, she was selected for the New Zealand squad at the delayed 2021 Women's Rugby League World Cup in England.
