= Kyra Simon =

Australian rugby league footballer (born 2002)

Personal information
- Born: 11 August 2002 (age 24) Taree, New South Wales, Australia
- Height: 165 cm (5 ft 5 in)
- Weight: 83 kg (13 st 1 lb)

Playing information
- Position: Prop
Club
Years	Team	Pld	T	G	FG	P
2021–22	Newcastle Knights	4	0	0	0	0
2023–	Parramatta Eels	3	0	0	0	0
	Total	7	0	0	0	0
Representative
Years	Team	Pld	T	G	FG	P
2022	Indigenous All Stars	1	0	0	0	0
- Source: As of 4 November 2026

Kyra Simon (born 11 August 2002) is an Australian professional rugby league footballer who currently plays for the Parramatta Eels in the NRL Women's Premiership. Her position is prop. She previously played for the Newcastle Knights.

== Background ==
Simon was born in Taree, New South Wales.

== Playing career ==
=== Early years ===
In 2021, Simon played for the Newcastle Knights' Tarsha Gale Cup team, winning the Coach's award at the conclusion of the season. In November 2021, she joined the Knights' inaugural NRLW squad.

=== 2022 ===
In February, Simon played for the Indigenous All Stars against the Māori All Stars. In round 4 of the delayed 2021 NRL Women's season, she made her NRLW debut for the Knights against the St. George Illawarra Dragons.

=== 2023 ===
In May, Simon joined the Parramatta Eels on a 1-year contract.
