= Phoebe Desmond =

Australian rugby league player

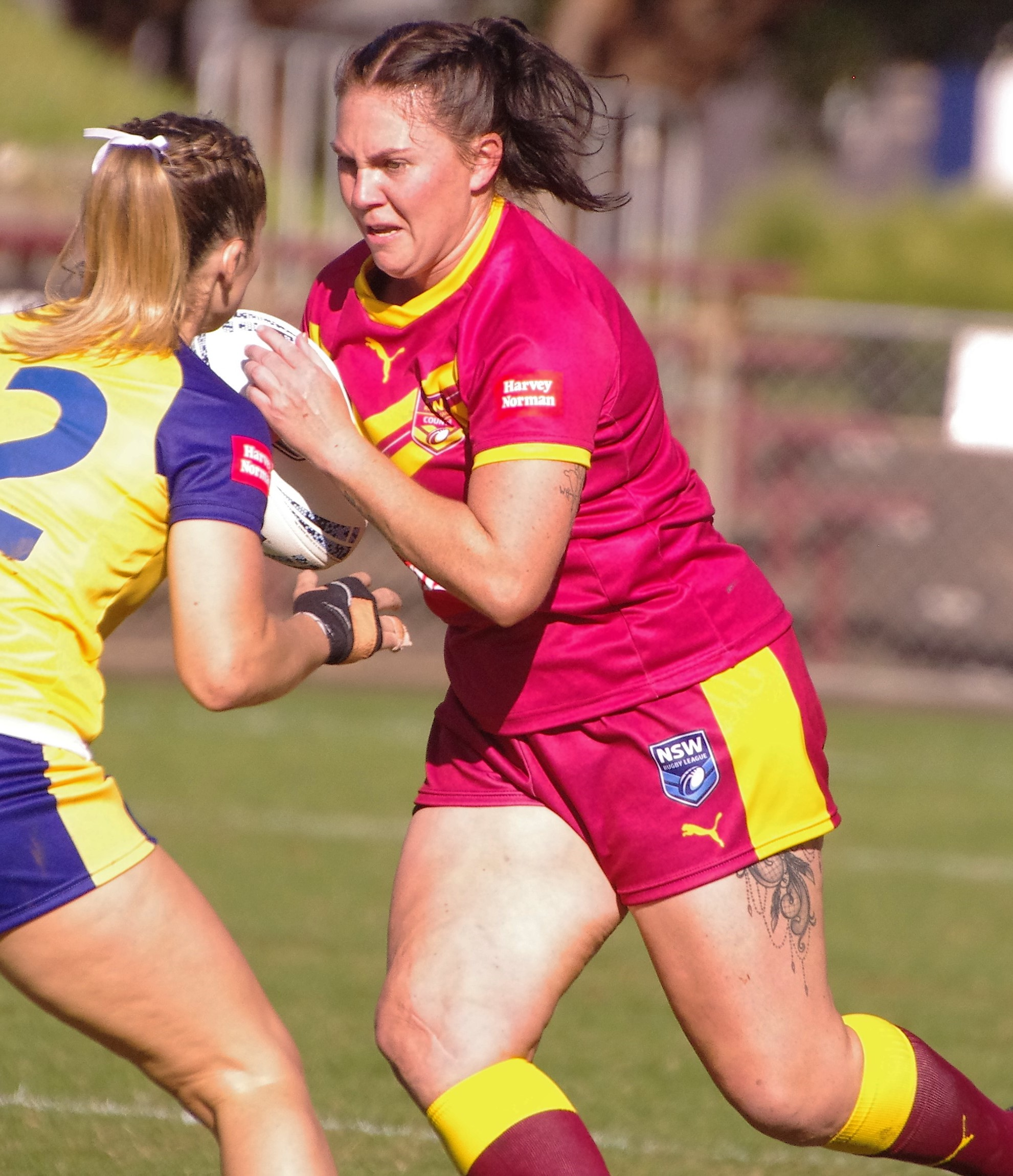

Personal information
- Born: 23 October 1990 (age 36) Singleton, New South Wales, Australia
- Height: 168 cm (5 ft 6 in)
- Weight: 89 kg (14 st 0 lb)

Playing information
- Position: Prop
Club
Years	Team	Pld	T	G	FG	P
2021	Newcastle Knights	4	1	0	0	4
- Source: As of 9 August 2022

Phoebe Desmond (born 23 October 1990) is an Australian professional rugby league footballer. Her position is prop. She previously played for the Newcastle Knights in the NRL Women's Premiership.

== Background ==
Born in Singleton, New South Wales, Desmond played her junior rugby league for the Singleton Greyhounds.

== Playing career ==
=== Early years ===
Desmond played five seasons for the Maitland Pickers, Hunter Stars and North Newcastle in the Sydney Metropolitan Women's Rugby League competition. She also played for the Aberglasslyn Ants. In early 2017, she represented the Singleton Greyhounds rugby league nines team, winning the Group 21 Rugby League nines title, before playing for the Newcastle Knights in an exhibition nines match against the Cronulla Sharks. Later that year, playing for North Newcastle, she was selected to represent the New South Wales Country women's side against New South Wales City. Desmond also spent some time in coaching, after she was kept on the sidelines for extended periods due to injuries. In 2021, she represented the Newcastle Maitland Region Knights side, winning the NSWRL Women's Country Championships final. In November 2021, she signed with the Newcastle Knights to be a part of their inaugural NRLW squad.

=== 2022 ===
In round 1 of the delayed 2021 NRL Women's season, Desmond made her NRLW debut for the Knights against the Parramatta Eels, scoring a try in the Knights' 12-13 loss. She played in 4 matches for the Knights, scoring one try, before parting ways with the club at the end of the season.
