= Autumn-Rain Stephens-Daly =

New Zealand rugby league player (born 1996)

Personal information
- Born: 6 August 1996 (age 29) Rotorua, New Zealand
- Height: 164 cm (5 ft 5 in)
- Weight: 69 kg (10 st 12 lb)

Playing information

Rugby league
- Position: Five-eighth, Fullback, Wing
Club
Years	Team	Pld	T	G	FG	P
2021–22	Newcastle Knights	8	3	0	0	12
2023	Nth Qld Cowboys	3	0	0	0	0
	Total	11	3	0	0	12
Representative
Years	Team	Pld	T	G	FG	P
2020–22	Kiwi Ferns	4	3	0	0	12
2022	Māori All Stars	1	2	0	0	8

Rugby union
- Position: Wing
Club
Years	Team	Pld	T	G	FG	P
2023	Hurricanes Poua	4	5	0	0	25
- Source: As of 30 July 2024

Autumn-Rain Stephens-Daly (born 6 August 1996) is a New Zealand professional rugby league footballer.

A five-eighth, fullback and wing, she previously played for the Newcastle Knights and North Queensland Cowboys in the NRLW and for Hurricanes Poua in the Super Rugby Aupiki competition.

== Background ==
Born in Rotorua, New Zealand, Stephens-Daly is of Māori descent.

== Playing career ==
=== Early years ===
Stephens-Daly started her career playing rugby sevens and rugby union. In 2014, she played for the Waikite rugby union team. She represented the Bay of Plenty Volcanix side from 2015 to 2019, only missing 2018. In November 2018, she was named in the New Zealand Maori Ferns train-on squad. In 2019, she played for the Whakarewarewa rugby union side. In 2020, she played for the Upper Central Stallions in the inaugural NZRL National Women's Championship. In November 2020, she represented the Kiwi Ferns against the Fetū Samoa invitational side, scoring two tries in the Kiwi Fern's 28-8 victory. In December 2020, she won the Kiwi Ferns Rookie of the Year award. In December 2021, she signed with the Newcastle Knights to be a part of their inaugural NRLW squad.

=== 2022 ===
In February, Stephens-Daly played for the Māori All Stars against the Indigenous All Stars, scoring the team's only points with two tries in their 8-18 loss. In round 1 of the delayed 2021 NRL Women's season, she made her NRLW debut for the Knights against the Parramatta Eels.

In October, she was selected for the New Zealand squad at the delayed 2021 Women's Rugby League World Cup in England.

=== 2023 ===
In March, Stephens-Daly signed played for the Hurricanes Poua in the Super Rugby Aupiki. She was one of three final signings confirmed for the side in December 2022.

On 17 May, Stephens-Daly returned to rugby league, signing a two-year contract with the North Queensland Cowboys.

In Round 3 of the 2023 NRL Women's season, she made her debut for the Cowboys in their 40–12 loss to the Brisbane Broncos. In Round 5, she tore her ACL in a loss to the Cronulla Sharks, ruling her out for the season.
