= Katie Green (rugby league) =

Australian professional rugby league footballer

Personal information
- Born: 7 September 1996 (age 29) Mackay, Queensland, Australia
- Height: 163 cm (5 ft 4 in)
- Weight: 68 kg (10 st 10 lb)

Playing information
- Position: Wing, Fullback
Club
Years	Team	Pld	T	G	FG	P
2021	Newcastle Knights	3	0	0	0	0
- Source: As of 9 August 2022

Katie Green (born 7 September 1996) is an Australian professional rugby league footballer. Her positions are wing and fullback. She previously played for the Newcastle Knights in the NRL Women's Premiership.

== Background ==
Green was born in Mackay, Queensland. She played touch football and rugby sevens in her junior years.

== Playing career ==
=== Early years ===
In 2018 and 2019, Green represented the North Queensland Marlins women's side. In May 2019, she represented Mackay in the Northern Region Women's Championship In 2020, she joined the North Queensland Gold Stars in the BHP Premiership. In December 2021, she signed with the Newcastle Knights to be a part of their inaugural NRLW squad.

=== 2022 ===
In round 1 of the delayed 2021 NRL Women's season, Green made her NRLW debut for the Knights against the Parramatta Eels. She played in 3 matches for the Knights, before parting ways with the club at the end of the season.
