= Rangimarie Edwards-Bruce =

New Zealand rugby league footballer

Personal information
- Born: 7 August 1997 (age 28) Kaitaia, New Zealand
- Height: 174 cm (5 ft 9 in)
- Weight: 79 kg (12 st 6 lb)

Playing information
- Position: Second-row
Club
Years	Team	Pld	T	G	FG	P
2021	Newcastle Knights	5	0	0	0	0
Representative
Years	Team	Pld	T	G	FG	P
2022	Māori All Stars	1	0	0	0	0
- Source: As of 9 August 2022

Rangimarie Edwards-Bruce (born 7 August 1997) is a New Zealand professional rugby league footballer. Her position is second-row. She previously played for the Newcastle Knights in the NRL Women's Premiership.

== Background ==
Edwards-Bruce was born in Kaitaia, New Zealand and is of Māori descent.

== Playing career ==
=== Early years ===
In 2018, Edwards-Bruce represented the Queensland Country team. In 2019, she was selected as part of the Queensland Female Performance Program squad. In 2021, she played for the North Queensland Gold Stars in the BHP Premiership. In December 2021, she signed with the Newcastle Knights to be a part of their inaugural NRLW squad.

=== 2022 ===
In February, Edwards-Bruce played for the Māori All Stars against the Indigenous All Stars. In round 1 of the delayed 2021 NRL Women's season, she made her NRLW debut for the Knights against the Parramatta Eels. She played in 5 matches for the Knights, before parting ways with the club at the end of the season.
