= Paige Parker =

Australian rules footballer

Personal information
- Born: 7 May 1995 (age 31) Brisbane Queensland, Australia
- Height: 172 cm (5 ft 8 in)
- Weight: 74 kg (11 st 9 lb)

Playing information
- Position: Centre
Club
Years	Team	Pld	T	G	FG	P
2021	Newcastle Knights	1	1	0	0	4
2022	Brisbane Broncos	0	0	0	0	0
	Total	1	1	0	0	4
- Source: As of 2022
Australian rules football career
Personal information
- Original team: Coorparoo (QWAFL)
- Draft: No. 9, 2018 AFL Women's draft
- Debut: Round 1, 2019, Brisbane vs. Greater Western Sydney, at Moreton Bay Central Sports Complex
- Position: Defender
Playing career^{1}
Years	Club	Games (Goals)
2019	Brisbane	4 (0)
2020–2021	Gold Coast	13 (2)
Total		17 (2)
- ^{1} Playing statistics correct to the end of the 2021 season.

Paige Parker (born 7 May 1995) is an Australian rules football and rugby league footballer. She played for Brisbane and the Gold Coast in the AFL Women's (AFLW), and the Newcastle Knights and Brisbane Broncos in the NRL Women's Premiership (NRLW).

== Early life ==
Parker was raised in Brisbane's northern suburb of Bracken Ridge to a family of Indigenous Australian (Quandamooka) descent. She attended St John Fisher College throughout her upbringing and excelled in touch football where she plays for the Brisbane Broncos and represents Australia at the World Cup level. She also played Australian rules football in her youth and was playing for Coorparoo in the AFL Queensland Women's League when she was drafted by Brisbane with the ninth pick in the 2018 AFL Women's draft.

== AFLW ==
Parker made her debut for Brisbane in the round 1 game against Greater Western Sydney at Moreton Bay Central Sports Complex on 3 February 2019. Following the 2019 season, she joined the Gold Coast. After playing 13 games over two seasons, Parker was delisted by the Gold Coast in June 2021.

== NRLW ==
On 3 December 2021, Parker was recruited by the Newcastle Knights to be a part of their inaugural NRL Women's Premiership squad.

In round 5 of the delayed 2021 NRL Women's season, Parker made her NRLW debut for the Knights against the Gold Coast Titans.

In June 2022, she signed with the Brisbane Broncos for the 2022 season. She left the club ahead of the 2023 season without having played an NRLW game.
