= 2021 NRL Women's season =

2021 NRL Telstra Women's Premiership
- Duration: 27 February – 10 April 2022
- Teams: 6
- Premiers: Sydney Roosters (1st Title)
- Minor premiers: Brisbane Broncos (4th Title)
- Matches played: 18
- Points scored: 616
- Broadcast partners: Nine Network; Fox League; Sky Sport (NZ); Sky Sports (UK)
- Wooden spoon: Newcastle Knights (1st spoon)
- Biggest home win: Broncos 38 — 4 Eels at Suncorp Stadium, Brisbane in Round 5.
- Biggest away win: Dragons 40 — 4 Knights at McDonald Jones Stadium, Newcastle in Round 4.
- Dally M Award: Millie Boyle and Emma Tonegato (Joint winners)
- Top point-scorer: Lauren Brown (38)
- Top try-scorer: Madison Bartlett (6)

New licences
- Expansion: Gold Coast Titans; Newcastle Knights; Parramatta Eels
- Departure: New Zealand Warriors (due to the Covid-19 pandemic restricting international travel).

The 2021 NRLW premiership was the fourth professional season of Women's rugby league in Australia. The season was planned to start in August 2021, postponed to October 2021 and further postponed to 2022 due to the ongoing COVID-19 pandemic.

The competition was held from February to April 2022, with the 2022 NRL Women's season later commencing in August 2022.

== Teams ==
Three new teams joined the competition: the Parramatta Eels, Gold Coast Titans and Newcastle Knights. The New Zealand Warriors entered a recess in this season due to the COVID-19 pandemic.

Teams for the Round 1 matches on Sunday, February 27 were announced on February 22, 2022.

Club	Season	Head coach	Captain(s)	Ref
Brisbane Broncos	4th season	Kelvin Wright	Ali Brigginshaw (6)	
Gold Coast Titans	1st season	Jamie Feeney	Brittany Breayley-Nati (6)	
Newcastle Knights	1st season	Casey Bromilow	Romy Teitzel (5)	
Parramatta Eels	1st season	Dean Widders	Simaima Taufa (5)	
St. George Illawarra Dragons	4th season	Jamie Soward	Kezie Apps (5) also Keeley Davis (2: Rounds 2 & 3)	
Sydney Roosters	4th season	John Strange	Corban Baxter (5) also Hannah Southwell (2: Rounds 1 & 2)	

Notes:

- In the Captain(s) column
- The number next to the name indicates the number of games played as captaincaptains only one, the Broncos, had both appear in every match.
  - The word also indicates the player deputised as captain when the regular captain missed one or more matches.
  - None of the clubs appointed joint captains.

== Win/loss table ==
Team	1	2	3	4	5	SF	GF
Brisbane Broncos	SYD +16	NEW +18	SGI +4	GCT −2	**PAR** **+34**	**SYD** **−6**	
Gold Coast Titans	SGI −8	SYD +10	PAR −10	**BRI** **+2**	**NEW** **+4**	SGI −6	
Newcastle Knights	**PAR** **−1**	**BRI** **−18**	SYD −16	**SGI** **−36**	GCT −4		
Parramatta Eels	NEW +1	SGI −10	**GCT** **+10**	**SYD** **−1**	BRI −34		
St. George Illawarra Dragons	**GCT** **+8**	**PAR** **+10**	**BRI** **−4**	NEW +36	**SYD** **+6**	**GCT** **+6**	**SYD** **−12**
Sydney Roosters	**BRI** **−16**	**GCT** **−10**	**NEW** **+16**	PAR +1	SGI −6	BRI +6	SGI +12
Team	1	2	3	4	5	SF	GF

Bold – Home game
Italics – Game played at neutral venue
Opponent for round listed above margin

== Home and away season ==
* Note all games are played in 2022 NOT 2021 due to the COVID-19 pandemic * All times AEDT Source:

=== Round 1 ===
Home	Score	Away	Match information				
Home	Score	Away	Date and time	Venue	Referees	Attendance	Reports
St. George Illawarra Dragons	20 – 12	Gold Coast Titans	Sunday, 27 February, 12:00 pm	McDonald Jones Stadium	Karra-Lee Nolan	2,615	
Sydney Roosters	4 – 20	Brisbane Broncos	Sunday 27 February, 1:50 pm	McDonald Jones Stadium	Belinda Sharpe	3,847	
Newcastle Knights	12 – 13	Parramatta Eels	Sunday 27 February, 3:40 pm	McDonald Jones Stadium	Kasey Badger	5,049	

=== Round 2 ===
Home	Score	Away	Match information				
Home	Score	Away	Date and time	Venue	Referees	Attendance	Reports
Newcastle Knights	10 – 28	Brisbane Broncos	Sunday, 6 March, 12:00 pm	WIN Stadium	Kasey Badger	1,036	
Sydney Roosters	16 – 26	Gold Coast Titans	Sunday, 6 March, 1:50 pm	WIN Stadium	Karra-Lee Nolan	1,278	
St. George Illawarra Dragons	10 – 0	Parramatta Eels	Sunday, 6 March, 3:40 pm	WIN Stadium	Belinda Sharpe	2,079	

=== Round 3 ===
Home	Score	Away	Match information				
Home	Score	Away	Date and time	Venue	Referees	Attendance	Reports
Sydney Roosters	28 – 12	Newcastle Knights	Saturday, 12 March, 1:00 pm	Sydney Cricket Ground	Karra-Lee Nolan		
St. George Illawarra Dragons	18 – 22	Brisbane Broncos	Sunday, 13 March, 12:00 pm	CommBank Stadium	Belinda Sharpe		
Parramatta Eels	24 – 14	Gold Coast Titans	Sunday, 13 March, 1:45 pm	CommBank Stadium	Kasey Badger		

=== Round 4 ===
Home	Score	Away	Match information				
Home	Score	Away	Date and time	Venue	Referees	Attendance	Reports
Gold Coast Titans	28 – 26	Brisbane Broncos	Saturday, 19 March, 1:00 pm	Cbus Super Stadium	Belinda Sharpe		
Parramatta Eels	18 – 19	Sydney Roosters	Sunday, 20 March, 12:00 pm	McDonald Jones Stadium	Kasey Badger		
Newcastle Knights	4 – 40	St. George Illawarra Dragons	Sunday, 20 March, 1:45 pm	McDonald Jones Stadium	Karra-Lee Nolan		

=== Round 5 ===
Home	Score	Away	Match information				
Home	Score	Away	Date and time	Venue	Referees	Attendance	Reports
St. George Illawarra Dragons	16 – 10	Sydney Roosters	Saturday, 26 March, 1:00 pm	Netstrata Jubilee Stadium	Belinda Sharpe	1,023	
Gold Coast Titans	14 – 10	Newcastle Knights	Sunday, 27 March, 12:00 pm	Suncorp Stadium	Karra-Lee Nolan		
Brisbane Broncos	38 – 4	Parramatta Eels	Sunday, 27 March, 1:45 pm	Suncorp Stadium	Kasey Badger		

=== Ladder ===
2021 NRL Women's season
Pos	Team	Pld	W	D	L	PF	PA	PD	Pts
1	Brisbane Broncos	5	4	0	1	134	64	+70	8
2	St. George Illawarra Dragons	5	4	0	1	104	48	+56	8
3	Gold Coast Titans	5	3	0	2	94	96	−2	6
4	Sydney Roosters	5	2	0	3	77	92	−15	4
5	Parramatta Eels	5	2	0	3	59	93	−34	4
6	Newcastle Knights	5	0	0	5	48	123	−75	0

Source: NRL.com

=== Ladder progression ===
- Numbers highlighted in green indicate that the team finished the round inside the top four.
- Numbers highlighted in blue indicates the team finished first on the ladder in that round.
- Numbers highlighted in red indicates the team finished last place on the ladder in that round.

	Team	1	2	3	4	5
1	Brisbane Broncos	2	4	6	6	8
2	St. George Illawarra Dragons	2	4	4	6	8
3	Gold Coast Titans	0	2	2	4	6
4	Sydney Roosters	0	0	2	4	4
5	Parramatta Eels	2	2	4	4	4
6	Newcastle Knights	0	0	0	0	0

== Finals series ==
On 25 March 2022 it was announced that both NRLW semi-finals will be held at Leichhardt Oval on Sunday, 3 April 2022. At the conclusion of Round 5 on 27 March the semi-finalists, match-ups and playing order were all confirmed.

Home	Score	Away	Match Information
Home	Score	Away	Date and Time (Local)	Venue	Referee	Crowd	Reports
**SEMI Finals**
St. George Illawarra Dragons	24 – 18	Gold Coast Titans	Sunday, 3 April 2022, 12.00pm	Leichhardt Oval	Kasey Badger	1,734
Brisbane Broncos	16 – 22	Sydney Roosters	Sunday, 3 April 2022, 1.45pm	Leichhardt Oval	Belinda Sharpe	2,124

=== Grand Final ===
Sunday, April 10, 2022.
1.30 PM

St. George Illawarra Dragons	4 – 16	Sydney Roosters
Tries: 1 Madison Bartlett; Goals: nil	1st: 4-0; 2nd: 0-16; Reports	Tries: 3 Yasmin Meakes; Isabelle Kelly; Olivia Higgins; Goals: 2 Zahara Temara 2

Moreton Daily Stadium
Attendance: 7,855
Karyn Murphy Medal: Sarah Togatuki
Referee: Belinda Sharpe

== Team of the Week ==
At the conclusion of each round, the media department of the NRL announce a team of the week. Thirteen players — equivalent to the number of players on the field for one team — are named.

Jersey	Position	Round 1	Round 2	Round 3	Round 4	Round 5	Semi-finals
1	Fullback	Botille Vette-Welsh	Tamika Upton	Botille Vette-Welsh	Emma Tonegato	Emma Tonegato	Emma Tonegato
2	Wing	Teagan Berry	Katelyn Vaha'akolo	Hagiga Mosby	Karina Brown	Madison Bartlett	Leianne Tufuga
3	Centre	Jessica Sergis	Amy Turner	Tiana Penitani	Evania Pelite	Shenae Ciesiolka	Jessica Sergis
4	Centre	Tiana Penitani	Shenae Ciesiolka	Isabelle Kelly	Jaime Chapman	Isabelle Kelly	Isabelle Kelly
5	Wing	Emily Bass	Madison Bartlett	Brydie Parker	Hailee-Jay Ormond-Maunsell	Hagiga Mosby	Julia Robinson
6	Five-eighth	Tarryn Aiken	Tarryn Aiken	Tarryn Aiken	Taliah Fuimaono	Taliah Fuimaono	Zahara Temara
7	Halfback	Rachael Pearson	Rachael Pearson	Maddie Studdon	Kimiora Breayley-Nati	Ali Brigginshaw	Raecene McGregor
8	Prop	Millie Boyle	Millie Boyle	Elsie Albert	Mya Hill-Moana	Millie Boyle	Millie Boyle
9	Hooker	Keeley Davis	Brittany Breayley-Nati	Lauren Brown	Lauren Brown	Olivia Higgins	Keeley Davis
10	Prop	Phoebe Desmond	Elsie Albert	Annetta Nu'uausala	Steph Hancock	Sarah Togatuki	Steph Hancock
11	Second-row	Olivia Kernick	Tazmin Gray	Olivia Kernick	Kaitlyn Phillips	Kody House	Keilee Joseph
12	Second-row	Amber Hall	Shaylee Bent	Shaylee Bent	Shaniah Power	Amber Hall	Amber Hall
13	Lock	Simaima Taufa	Destiny Brill	Destiny Brill	Hannah Southwell	Jessika Elliston	Jocelyn Kelleher

== Dream Team ==
In the week between the Semi-finals and Grand Final, the Rugby League Players Association announced a Dream Team. The team was selected by the players, who each cast one vote for each position.

Jersey	Position	Player
1	Fullback	Emma Tonegato
2	Wing	Karina Brown
3	Centre	Jaime Chapman
4	Centre	Shenae Ciesiolka
5	Wing	Teagan Berry
6	Fullback	Taliah Fuimaono
7	Halfback	Rachael Pearson
8	Prop	Elsie Albert
9	Hooker	Lauren Brown
10	Prop	Millie Boyle
11	Second-row	Amber Hall
12	Second-row	Shaniah Power
13	Lock	Destiny Brill

== Individual awards ==
=== Dally M Medal Awards Night ===
The following awards were presented at the Dally M Medal Awards ceremony in Brisbane on the night of 7 April 2022.

Dally M Medal Player of the Year: Tied

- Millie Boyle ( Brisbane Broncos); and
- Emma Tonegato ( St George Illawarra Dragons)

Captain of the Year: Brittany Breayley-Nati ( Gold Coast Titans)

Coach of the Year: Jamie Soward ( St George Illawarra Dragons)

Try of the Year: Shaniah Power for Gold Coast Titans versus Brisbane Broncos (19 March 2022).

Tackle of the Year: Emma Tonegato for St George Illawarra Dragons on Jessica Sergis of the Sydney Roosters (26 March 2022).

=== Grand Final Day Awards ===
The following awards were presented at Redcliffe, Queensland on Grand Final day, 10 April 2022.

Veronica White Medal: Karina Brown ( Gold Coast Titans)

Karyn Murphy Medal Player of the Match: Sarah Togatuki ( Sydney Roosters)

=== RLPA Players' Champion Awards ===
The following awards were voted for by NRLW players at the end of the season.

The Players' Champion: Emma Tonegato ( St George Illawarra Dragons)

Rookie of the Year: Destiny Brill ( Gold Coast Titans)

Dennis Tutty Award: Ali Brigginshaw ( Brisbane Broncos)

=== Statistical Awards ===
Highest Point Scorer in Regular-season: Lauren Brown ( Brisbane Broncos) 34 (17 g)

Top Try Scorers in Regular-season: 4 — Madison Bartlett ( St George Illawarra Dragons), Emily Bass ( Brisbane Broncos), Teagan Berry ( St George Illawarra Dragons), Shenae Ciesiolka ( Brisbane Broncos), and Hagiga Mosby ( Brisbane Broncos).

Highest Point Scorer across the Full Season: Lauren Brown ( Brisbane Broncos) 38 (19 g)

Top Try Scorer across the Full Season: Madison Bartlett ( St George Illawarra Dragons) 6

=== Club Awards ===
Award	Knights	Eels	Titans	Broncos	Dragons	Roosters
Player of the Year	Annetta Nu'uausala	Botille Vette-Welsh	Jessika Elliston	Millie Boyle	Tied. Elsie Albert & Emma Tonegato	Isabelle Kelly
Player's Player	Annetta Nu'uausala	Simaima Taufa	—	Lauren Brown	—	Sarah Togatuki
Highest Point Scorer	Romy Teitzel 8 (2t); Kirra Dibb 8 (4 g)	Maddie Studdon 19 (1t 7 g 1fg)	Steph Hancock 16 (4t); Jasmine Peters 16 (4t)	Lauren Brown 38 (19 g)	Rachael Pearson 28 (1t 12 g)	Zahara Temara 21 (10 g 1fg)
Top Try Scorer	Romy Teitzel 2	Abbi Church 2 Tiana Penitani 2 Christian Pio 2	Steph Hancock 4 Jasmine Peters 4	Emily Bass 4 Shenae Ciesiolka 4 Hagiga Mosby 4	Madison Bartlett 6	Isabelle Kelly 4
Coaches Award	—	Shirley Mailangi	—	Julia Robinson	Shaylee Bent	—
Community Award	—	Simaima Taufa	Karina Brown	Tallisha Harden	—	Jocelyn Kelleher
Rookie of the Year	—	—	—	Emily Bass	—	Olivia Kernick
Try of the Year	—	—	—	Shenae Ciesiolka	—	Isabelle Kelly
Back of the Year	—	—	—	Shenae Ciesiolka	—	—
Forward of the Year	—	—	—	Millie Boyle	—	—

== Players ==
=== Brisbane Broncos ===
The team was coached by Kelvin Wright. Jumper numbers in the table below are those assigned to be used in the Semi-finals.

J#	Player	Position(s)	Debut	Seasons	Mat	Try	Goal	Pts	2018	2019	2020	2021	2021 State	Interstate	Tests
6	Tarryn Aiken	Five-eighth, Halfback	2019	3	14	3	0	12	—	4 m	4 m 1t	6 m 2t	7 m 3t 1 g	2 m 1t	—
5	Emily Bass	Centre, Wing	2021	1	5	4	0	16	—	—	—	5 m 4t	—	—	—
8	Millie Boyle	Prop	2019	3	13	4	0	16	—	4 m	4 m 1t	5 m 3t	7 m 5t	3 m	1m
7	Ali Brigginshaw	Halfback, Lock	2018	4	18	5	0	20	4 m 2t	4 m 1t	4 m 1t	6 m 1t	9 m 3t 13 g	10 m 1t 2 g	17 m 7t 16g
9	Lauren Brown	Hooker, Five-eighth, Lock	2020	2	10	1	19	42	—	—	4 m 1t	6 m 19 g	7 m 25 g	2 m 6 g	—
4	Shenae Ciesiolka	Centre, Fullback, Wing	2020	2	9	4	0	16	—	—	3 m	6 m 4t	9 m 5t	2 m	—
18	Jada Ferguson	Five-eighth	2021	1	4	0	0	0	—	—	—	4 m	6 m 1t	—	—
13	Lavinia Gould	Hooker, Lock	2018	4	14	2	0	8	4 m 1t	4 m 1t	2 m	4 m	8 m 1t	—	—
12	Amber Hall	Second-row, Prop	2019	3	13	4	0	16	—	4 m 1t	3 m 1t	6 m 2t	—	—	6 m 2t
15	Tallisha Harden	Second-row, Lock	2018	4	14	2	0	8	1 m	3 m	4 m 1t	6 m 1t	6 m 2t	4 m	2 m 1t
21	Toni Hunt	Centre, Wing	2021	1	1	0	0	0	—	—	—	1 m	8 m 2t	—	—
24	Lesa Kaleti Mataafa	Loose forward	—	0	0	0	0	0	—	—	—	—	—	—	—
10	Chelsea Lenarduzzi	Second-row, Lock, Prop	2018	4	17	4	0	16	4 m	3 m 1t	4 m 2t	6 m 1t	6 m 4t	4 m	1m
14	Hayley Maddick	Fullback	2021	1	5	0	0	0	—	—	—	5 m	6 m	—	—
19	Hagiga Mosby	Centre, Wing	2021	1	4	4	0	16	—	—	—	4 m 4t	—	—	—
16	Roxette Murdoch	Second-row	2021	1	6	1	0	4	—	—	—	6 m 1t	10 m 3t	—	—
11	Kaitlyn Phillips	Second-row, Prop	2020	2	7	1	0	4	—	—	2 m	5 m 1t	6 m 1t	—	—
20	China Polata	Wing	2021	1	1	0	0	0	—	—	—	1 m	—	—	—
22	Jessikah Reeves	Prop	—	0	0	0	0	0	—	—	—	—	7 m 1t	—	—
2	Julia Robinson	Wing, Five-eighth, Fullback	2018	4	13	6	0	24	4 m 2t	3 m 1t	4 m 2t	2 m 1t	4 m 2t	2 m	1 m 1t
34	Nakita Sao	Lock, Halfback	2021	1	1	0	0	0	—	—	—	1 m	6 m 1t	—	—
17	Sara Sautia	Second-row	2021	1	6	0	0	0	—	—	—	6 m	6 m 1t	—	—
3	Amy Turner	Centre, Five-eighth	2019	2	10	3	0	12	—	4 m 1t	—	6 m 2t	4 m 2t	1 m	?m
1	Tamika Upton	Fullback	2019	3	11	7	0	28	—	3 m 1t	4 m 5t	4 m 1t	5 m 6t	2 m 2t	—

Notes:

- Amy Turner was selected in the 2007 Australian Jillaroos team that played two Test Matches against New Zealand Māori women's rugby league team, however, the lists of players that took the field in those matches are yet to be confirmed by the contributor to this page.
- Nakita Sao played for Wests Panthers and later North Sydney in the 2021 state competitions of, respectively, Queensland and New South Wales.
- Nakita Sao also played for Wests Panthers ( 4 m 1t) in the Queensland's Under 19 club matches in 2021.
- In 2021, Sara Sautia played for Canterbury Bulldogs ( 8 m 2t) played in Tarsha Gale Cup Under 19 matches in New South Wales and subsequently played for Wests Panthers in the senior state competition in Queensland.

=== Gold Coast Titans ===
The team was coached by Jamie Feeney. Jumper numbers in the table are those assigned to be used in the Semi-finals.

J#	Player	Position(s)	Debut	Seasons	Mat	Try	Goal	Pts	2018	2019	2020	2021	2021 State	Interstate	Tests
9	Brittany Breayley-Nati	Hooker	2018	3	14	3	0	12	4 m 1t	4 m	—	6 m 2t	7 m 3t	7 m	10 m 1t
7	Kimiora Breayley-Nati	Centre, Five-eighth, Lock	2021	1	6	0	4	8	—	—	—	6 m 4 g	5 m 1t	—	—
13	Destiny Brill	Lock	2021	1	6	1	0	4	—	—	—	6 m 1t	6 m 2t	1 m 1t	—
2	Karina Brown	Fullback, Wing	2018	4	16	2	0	8	4 m	3 m	3 m	6 m 2t	8 m 4t	9 m 3t	11 m 8t
21	Zara Canfield	Second-row	2021	1	4	0	2	4	—	—	—	4 m 2 g	7 m 3t 7 g	—	—
8	Brianna Clark	Prop	2020	2	6	0	7	14	—	—	2 m	4 m 7 g	5 m 1 g	1 m	—
16	Laikha Clarke	Prop	2021	1	2	0	0	0	—	—	—	2 m	8 m 1t	—	—
23	Lauren Dam	Centre, Wing	2021	1	2	0	0	0	—	—	—	2 m	7 m 7t	—	—
15	Jessika Elliston	Second-row	2019	3	11	1	0	4	—	1 m	4 m	6 m 1t	—	1 m	—
1	Jetaya Faifua	Centre, Wing	2021	1	4	0	0	0	—	—	—	4 m	5 m 7t	—	—
12	Tazmin Gray	Second-row, Lock	2018	4	15	2	0	8	4 m 1t	4 m	3 m	4 m 1t	9 m 5t	6 m 1t	1 m 1t
6	Grace Griffin	Five-eighth	2021	1	4	0	0	0	—	—	—	4 m	9 m 3t	—	—
14	Georgia Hale	Hooker, Lock	2018	4	14	2	0	8	3 m 1t	3 m 1t	3 m	5 m	11 m 1t	—	11m
10	Steph Hancock	Prop	2018	4	17	4	0	16	4 m	4 m	3 m	6 m 4t	—	14 m 8t 4 g	20 m 13t 7g
20	Karli Hansen	Halfback	—	0	0	0	0	0	—	—	—	—	—	—	1 m 1t 2g
33	Shannon Mato	Prop	2020	2	6	1	0	4	—	—	4 m	2 m 1t	5 m 1t	2 m	—
18	Cobie-Jane Morgan	Halfback	2021	1	3	0	0	0	—	—	—	3 m	—	?m	—
24	Lauren Moss	Wing	—	0	0	0	0	0	—	—	—	—	8 m 7t	—	—
19	April Ngatupuna	Second-row, Lock	2021	1	5	0	0	0	—	—	—	5 m	3 m 1t	—	—
5	Hailee-Jay Ormond-Maunsell	Centre	2021	1	4	2	0	8	—	—	—	4 m 2t	—	—	—
22	Evania Pelite	Fullback, Centre	2020	2	8	4	0	16	—	—	3 m 3t	5 m 1t	—	—	—
3	Jasmine Peters	Centre	2021	1	5	4	0	16	—	—	—	5 m 4t	7 m 1t	—	—
41	Rona Peters	Prop	2018	2	8	3	0	12	4 m 1t	4 m 2t	—	—	6 m 1 g	6 m	14 m 7t
4	Shaniah Power	Second-row	2020	2	8	3	0	12	—	—	2 m 2t	6 m 1t	7 m 3t	2 m	—
11	Tiana Raftstrand-Smith	Second-row, Centre	2021	1	6	1	1	6	—	—	—	6 m 1t 1 g	4 m 2t	1 m	—
35	Brooke Saddler	Fullback, Wing	—	0	0	0	0	0	—	—	—	—	7 m 2t	—	—
42	Crystal Tamarua	Second-row	2018	3	7	0	0	0	1 m	3 m	3 m	—	8 m 2t	—	7 m 1t

Notes:

- Crystal Tamarua has played three matches for the Cook Islands and four matches for the Kiwi Ferns.
- Cobie-Jane Morgan was selected in the 2015 New South Wales women's rugby league team.
- The following players participated in Queensland's Under 19 club tournament in 2021: Destiny Brill (West Panthers 4 m 2t), Jetaya Faifua (Burleigh Bears 4 m 1t ), April Ngatupuna (Wests Panthers 4 m 4t), Hailee-Jay Ormond-Maunsell (Burleigh Bears 4 m 4t ), Jasmine Peters (Mackay 1 m 2t), Tiana Raftstrand-Smith (Burleigh Bears 1 m 2t)
- In 2021, Georgia Hale played in both Queensland and NSW state senior competitions for, respectively, the Tweed Head Seagulls ( 7 m 1t) and North Sydney Bears ( 4 m).

=== Newcastle Knights ===
The team was coached by Casey Bromilow. Jumper numbers in the table are those assigned to be used in Round 5.

J#	Player	Position(s)	Debut	Seasons	Mat	Try	Goal	Pts	2018	2019	2020	2021	2021 State	Interstate	Tests
16	Ngatokotoru Arakua	Prop	2018	3	10	2	0	8	4 m 2t	4 m	—	2 m	—	—	8m
8	Phoebe Desmond	Prop	2021	1	4	1	0	4	—	—	—	4 m 1t	—	—	—
7	Kirra Dibb	Five-eighth, Halfback	2019	3	11	1	12	28	—	3 m 4 g	3 m 1t 4 g	5 m 4 g	10 m 4t 26 g	1 m 1 g	1m
11	Rangimarie Edwards-Bruce	Second-row, Lock, Prop	2021	1	5	0	0	0	—	—	—	5 m	8 m 2t	—	—
24	Shannon Evans	Five-eighth, Fullback	2021	1	1	0	0	0	—	—	—	1 m	6 m 2t 4 g	—	—
18	Maitua Feterika	Prop	2018	3	11	3	0	12	4 m 1t	4 m 1t	—	3 m 1t	—	1 m	12 m 8t
3	Jayme Fressard	Centre	2020	2	7	1	0	4	—	—	3 m	4 m 1t	9 m 6t	—	—
21	Chantelle Graham	interchange	2021	1	1	0	0	0	—	—	—	1 m	—	—	—
5	Katie Green	Centre, Wing	2021	1	3	0	0	0	—	—	—	3 m	7 m 5t	—	—
31	Caitlan Johnston	Prop	2019	2	4	0	0	0	—	3 m	—	1 m	10 m 5t	—	—
4	Bobbi Law	Centre	2019	3	7	2	0	8	—	1 m 1t	1 m 1t	5 m	—	—	—
14	Emma Manzelmann	Hooker	2021	1	5	0	0	0	—	—	—	5 m	7 m 2t	—	—
10	Annetta Nu'uausala	Prop, Second-row	2018	3	9	2	0	8	1 m	3 m 1t	—	5 m 1t	—	—	8 m 2t
12	Georgia Page	Second-row	2020	2	6	0	0	0	—	—	2 m	4 m	8 m 2t	—	—
23	Paige Parker	Centre	2021	1	1	1	0	4	—	—	—	1 m 1t	—	—	—
13	Charntay Poko	Lock, Five-eighth, Halfback	2019	2	8	1	2	8	—	3 m 1t	—	5 m 2 g	—	—	2 m 4g
20	Kayla Romaniuk	Lock, Prop	—	0	0	0	0	0	—	—	—	—	—	—	—
9	Krystal Rota	Hooker	2018	3	10	0	0	0	3 m	3 m	—	4 m	—	—	11 m 1t
15	Charlotte Scanlan	Lock	2021	1	3	0	0	0	—	—	—	3 m	—	—	5 m 1t
19	Kyra Simon	Prop	2021	1	2	0	0	0	—	—	—	2 m	—	—	—
6	Autumn-Rain Stephens-Daly	Five-eighth, Wing	2021	1	5	1	0	4	—	—	—	5 m 1t	—	—	1 m 2t
1	Romy Teitzel	Fullback	2020	2	6	2	0	8	—	—	1 m	5 m 2t	8 m 9t 16 g	—	—
17	Tahlulah Tillett	Halfback, Five-eighth	2021	1	4	0	0	0	—	—	—	4 m	8 m 2t	—	—
2	Katelyn Vaha'akolo	Wing	2021	1	5	1	0	4	—	—	—	5 m 1t	—	—	1 m 1t
22	Kararaina Wira-Kohu	Prop	2021	1	1	0	0	0	—	—	—	1 m	—	—	1m

Notes:

- Caitlan Johnston was injured in the first match and did not play again in the season.
- Maitua Feterika has played one match for the Samoa women's national rugby league team in 2011 and, subsequently, eleven matches for the Kiwi Ferns.
- Kayla Romaniuk ( 6 m) and Kyra Simon ( 6 m) played for Newcastle in the 2021 Tarsha Gale Cup for Under 21s.

=== Parramatta Eels ===
The team was coached by Dean Widders. Jumper numbers in the table are those to be used in Round 5.

J#	Player	Position(s)	Debut	Seasons	Mat	Try	Goal	Pts	2018	2019	2020	2021	2021 State	Interstate	Tests
26	Therese Aiton	Hooker	2021	1	2	0	0	0	—	—	—	2 m	6 m 4t	?m	1m
10	Kennedy Cherrington	Prop	2020	2	9	0	0	0	—	—	4 m	5 m	10 m 3t	1 m	—
15	Abbi Church	Centre, Fullback	2021	1	5	2	0	8	—	—	—	5 m 2t	8 m 3t	—	—
6	Emily Curtain	Five-eighth, Halfback	2021	1	3	1	0	4	—	—	—	3 m 1t	10 m 6t 32 g	—	—
18	Jocephy Daniels	Centre	2021	1	3	0	0	0	—	—	—	3 m	10 m 12t	—	—
23	Jade Etherden	Second-row	2020	2	3	0	0	0	—	—	1 m	2 m	10 m 4t	—	—
27	Fatafehi Hanisi	Prop	—	0	0	0	0	0	—	—	—	—	2 m	—	—
8	Filomina Hanisi	Prop	2020	2	9	0	0	0	—	—	4 m	5 m	9 m	2 m 1t	—
5	Rikeya Horne	Wing, Centre, Fullback	2018	4	11	1	0	4	3 m 1t	3 m	1 m	4 m	8 m 6t	—	—
17	Ellie Johnston	Second-row	2020	2	8	1	0	4	—	—	3 m	5 m 1t	11 m 8t	—	—
21	Tommaya Kelly-Sines	Prop	2021	1	4	0	0	0	—	—	—	4 m	7 m 2t	—	—
14	Shirley Mailangi	Hooker, Lock	2021	1	5	0	0	0	—	—	—	5 m	11 m 4t 1 g	—	—
9	Nita Maynard	Hooker	2018	4	15	1	0	4	4 m	3 m	4 m 1t	4 m	10 m 4t	1 m	9 m 2t
16	Sereana Naitokatoka	Five-eighth, Halfback	2021	1	4	0	0	0	—	—	—	4 m	10 m 10t 18 g	—	1 m 4g
2	Taina Naividi	Wing, Fullback	2021	1	5	0	0	0	—	—	—	5 m	10 m 9t	—	—
19	Christine Pauli	Prop	2020	2	5	0	0	0	—	—	3 m	2 m	8 m 2t	—	1m
3	Tiana Penitani	Centre, Fullback	2019	3	11	5	0	20	—	4 m 2t	2 m 1t	5 m 2t	10 m 7t	3 m 1t	1m
25	Katrina May Phippen	Fullback	—	0	0	0	0	0	—	—	—	—	11 m 3t 6 g	—	—
11	Christian Pio	Second-row, Prop	2021	1	4	2	0	8	—	—	—	4 m 2t	10 m 2t	—	—
24	Tess Staines	Centre, Wing	—	0	0	0	0	0	—	—	—	—	—	—	—
7	Maddie Studdon	Halfback	2018	4	13	1	15	35	2 m	4 m 8 g	2 m	5 m 1t 7 g 1fg	9 m 3t 45 g	7 m 1t 7 g	6 m 1t 13g
22	Mareva Swann	Wing	—	0	0	0	0	0	—	—	—	—	8 m 6t	—	—
13	Simaima Taufa	Lock	2018	4	15	3	0	12	4 m	2 m 2t	4 m	5 m 1t	9 m 2t	7 m 1t	9m
1	Botille Vette-Welsh	Fullback	2018	4	12	2	0	8	1 m	4 m 1t	2 m	5 m 1t	8 m 6t	3 m 1t	1m

Notes:

- Maddie Studdon kicked a field goal in the Round 1 match of the 2021 NRLW season.
- Therese Aiton played for Queensland in 2008 (in one or both of two matches that year) and for Papua New Guinea in 2018 (in a trial against the Brisbane Broncos and against the Prime Minister's XIII) and in 2019 (a Test Match against Fiji).
- In 2021, Fatafehi Hanisi played for St George ( 11 m 2t) in the Tarsha Gale Cup for Under 19s.
- Tess Stains played for Riverina and for NSW Country Origin in 2021. In 2019, Staines played for the Prime Minister's XIII.

=== St. George Illawarra Dragons ===
The team was coached by Jamie Soward.Jumper numbers in the table are those assigned to be used in the Grand Final.

J#	Player	Position(s)	Debut	Seasons	Mat	Try	Goal	Pts	2018	2019	2020	2021	2021 State	Interstate	Tests
8	Elsie Albert	Prop	2020	2	10	2	0	8	—	—	3 m	7 m 2t	—	—	3m
10	Kezie Apps	Prop, Second-row, Lock	2018	4	14	1	0	4	3 m	4 m 1t	2 m	5 m	9 m 4t	8 m 2t	10 m 2t
5	Madison Bartlett	Wing	2019	3	11	8	0	32	—	2 m 1t	3 m 1t	6 m 6t	—	—	1 m 1t
12	Shaylee Bent	Second-row, Centre	2019	3	13	2	0	8	—	4 m 1t	2 m	7 m 1t	6 m	1 m	—
2	Teagan Berry	Wing	2020	2	8	5	1	22	—	—	1 m 1t 1 g	7 m 4t	3 m 6t	—	—
19	Keele Browne	Centre	2021	1	3	1	0	4	—	—	—	3 m 1t	3 m 2t	—	—
3	Jaime Chapman	Fullback, Wing	2020	2	9	3	0	12	—	—	3 m	6 m 3t	4 m 1t	—	—
9	Keeley Davis	Hooker	2018	4	17	1	0	4	3 m	4 m	3 m	7 m 1t	8 m 2t	1 m	2m
14	Quincy Dodd	Hooker	2019	3	12	4	0	16	—	1 m	4 m 3t	7 m 1t	10 m 9t	2 m	—
16	Tegan Dymock	Lock	2021	1	3	0	0	0	—	—	—	3 m	4 m	—	—
6	Taliah Fuimaono	Centre, Five-eighth, Halfback	2021	1	7	0	0	0	—	—	—	7 m	9 m 7t	—	1m
11	Talei Holmes	Second-row	2020	2	7	0	0	0	—	—	3 m	4 m	11 m 13t	—	1m
15	Kody House	Second-row	2018	2	7	2	0	8	1 m 1t	—	—	6 m 1t	8 m 6t	4 m	0m
20	Shellie Long	Centre, Wing	—	0	0	0	0	0	—	—	—	—	7 m 6t	—	—
4	Page McGregor	Centre, Fullback	2021	1	7	1	0	4	—	—	—	7 m 1t	10 m 10t	—	—
21	Aliti Namoce Sagano	Second-row, Prop	2019	2	7	0	0	0	—	3 m	—	4 m	6 m 3t	—	—
7	Rachael Pearson	Halfback	2021	1	6	1	12	28	—	—	—	6 m 1t 12 g	9 m 2t 29 g	—	—
23	Matilda Power	Halfback, Five-eighth	—	0	0	0	0	0	—	—	—	—	6 m 3t 31 g	—	—
22	Alexandra Sulusi	Prop	2021	1	1	0	0	0	—	—	—	1 m	4 m 1t	—	5m
18	Renee Targett	Halfback	2021	1	6	0	0	0	—	—	—	6 m	10 m	—	—
1	Emma Tonegato	Fullback, Centre, Wing	2021	1	7	4	0	16	—	—	—	7 m 4t	—	?m	3 m 3t
24	Chantel Tugaga	Second-row, Lock	2021	1	1	0	0	0	—	—	—	1 m	—	—	—
13	Holli Wheeler	Lock, Second-row	2018	3	14	0	2	4	3 m	4 m	—	7 m 2 g	10 m 3t	3 m	2m
17	Janelle Williams	Prop, Second-row	2021	1	4	0	0	0	—	—	—	4 m	9 m	—	—

Notes:

- Natassja Purontakanen (Second-row) from Valleys (9 m 1t) was signed to play in the delayed 2021 season but was injured during pre-season training and did not play.
- Emma Tonegato was selected for the New South Wales women's rugby league team in 2012 and 2013, however, the lists of players that took the field in those matches are yet to be confirmed by the contributor to this page.
- In 2021, Teagan Berry ( 9 m 11t), Keele Browne 8 m 3t), and Chantel Tugaga ( 7 m 2t) played for Illawarra in the Tarsha Gale Cup for Under 19s.
- In 2021, Tegan Dymock played for Cronulla ( 1 m) in the Tarsha Gale Cup for Under 19s.

=== Sydney Roosters ===
The premiership winning team was coached by John Strange.Jumper numbers in the table are those that were used in the Grand Final.

J#	Player	Position(s)	Debut	Seasons	Mat	Try	Goal	Pts	2018	2019	2020	2021	2021 State	Interstate	Tests
1	Corban Baxter	Fullback, Five-eighth	2019	3	12	2	0	8	—	3 m	4 m 2t	5 m	10 m 4t	6 m 1t	7 m 2t
22	Shawden Burton	Prop	2021	1	2	0	0	0	—	—	—	2 m	11 m 3t	—	—
37	Samantha Economos	Second-row	2020	2	4	0	0	0	—	—	3 m	1 m	8 m 1t	—	—
9	Olivia Higgins	Hooker	2021	1	7	1	0	4	—	—	—	7 m 1t	11 m 1t	—	—
19	Kalosipani Hopoate	interchange	—	0	0	0	0	0	—	—	—	—	—	—	—
10	Mya Hill-Moana	Prop	2021	1	6	1	0	4	—	—	—	6 m 1t	10 m 4t	—	—
15	Keilee Joseph	Second-row	2021	1	6	2	0	8	—	—	—	6 m 2t	6 m 2t	—	—
17	Simone Karpani	Lock	2021	1	6	0	0	0	—	—	—	6 m	—	—	—
14	Jocelyn Kelleher	Halfback	2020	2	10	1	0	4	—	—	3 m	7 m 1t	11 m 7t 12 g	—	—
4	Isabelle Kelly	Centre, Fullback	2018	4	16	6	0	24	4 m 2t	3 m	2 m	7 m 4t	7 m 5t	7 m 4t	7 m 9t
12	Olivia Kernick	Second-row	2021	1	7	3	0	12	—	—	—	7 m 3t	11 m 2t	—	—
31	Atasi Lafai	interchange	—	0	0	0	0	0	—	—	—	—	—	—	—
20	Lauretta Leao-Seve	Prop	—	0	0	0	0	0	—	—	—	—	9 m 2t	—	1m
23	Taylor-Adeline Mapusua	Centre	2021	1	2	0	0	0	—	—	—	2 m	8 m 7t	—	—
7	Raecene McGregor	Five-eighth	2018	4	18	1	0	4	3 m	4 m 1t	4 m	7 m	2 m 1t	—	7 m 5t
11	Yasmin Meakes	Second-row, Centre	2020	2	11	3	0	12	—	—	4 m 2t	7 m 1t	10 m 7t	2 m	—
18	Joeli Morris	Lock	2021	1	1	0	0	0	—	—	—	1 m	6 m 2t	—	—
5	Brydie Parker	Wing, Five-eighth	2018	3	13	4	0	16	2 m 1t	—	4 m	7 m 3t	9 m 2 g	0 m	—
16	Tayla Predebon	Prop	2021	1	7	0	0	0	—	—	—	7 m	11 m 7t	—	—
21	Otesa Pule	Second-row, Centre	—	0	0	0	0	0	—	—	—	—	—	—	—
22	Claire Reed	Centre, Fullback	—	0	0	0	0	0	—	—	—	—	4 m 4t	—	—
3	Jessica Sergis	Centre, Fullback	2018	4	16	6	0	24	3 m 1t	4 m 3t	3 m 1t	6 m 1t	9 m 17t	4 m 4t	1 m 1t
13	Hannah Southwell	Lock	2018	4	16	0	3	6	3 m	3 m	3 m	7 m 3 g	9 m 2t 32 g	4 m	2m
41	Chante Temara	Hooker	2020	1	2	0	0	0	—	—	2 m	—	8 m 1t	—	—
6	Zahara Temara	Five-eighth, Halfback	2018	4	18	1	22	49	4 m 3 g	3 m	4 m 1t 9 g	7 m 10 g 1fg	9 m 1t 4 g	4 m	5 m 4t
24	Taneka Todhunter	Hooker, Halfback	—	0	0	0	0	0	—	—	—	—	1 m	—	—
8	Sarah Togatuki	Prop, Lock	2018	3	14	3	0	12	3 m	—	4 m	7 m 3t	10 m 4t	2 m	1m
2	Leianne Tufuga	Wing, Centre	2021	1	7	2	0	8	—	—	—	7 m 2t	11 m 11t	—	1 m 1t

Notes:

- Zahara Temara kicked a field goal in the Round 4 match of the 2021 NRLW season.
- Brydie Parker was selected in the extended squad of the New South Wales women's rugby league team in 2020 and 2021, but did not play in either match.
- In 2021, Keilee Joseph ( 8 m 3t), Otesa Pule ( 11 m 10t) and Taneka Todhunter ( 11 m 6t) played for the Indigenous Academy Sydney Roosters in the Tarsha Gale Cup for Under 19s.
