= 2027 NRL Women's season =

Australian women's rugby league 2027 season

NRL Telstra Women's Premiership
- Duration: 1 July 2027 to 3 October 2027
- Teams: 12
- Matches played: 71
- Broadcast partners: Nine Network; Kayo Sports; Sky Sport (NZ); Sky Sports (UK)

The 2027 NRL Women's season will be the tenth professional season of the NRL Women's Premiership. The release of the draw confirmed that the 2027 NRLW season will follow the same format of the 2025 and 2026 seasons, with twelve teams playing eleven rounds, with the Grand Final to be held on the same day as the men's NRL Grand Final, on Sunday, 3 October 2027 at Accor Stadium.

== Teams ==
The twelve teams that participated in the 2026 season will again compete in 2027: seven from New South Wales, three from Queensland and one each from the Australian Capital Territory and New Zealand.

| Club | Season | Home ground(s) | Head coach | Captain(s) | Titles | Ref |
|---|---|---|---|---|---|---|
| Brisbane Broncos | 10th | Suncorp Stadium and Totally Workwear Stadium | Scott Prince | Tamika Upton | 4 | |
| Canberra Raiders | 5th | GIO Stadium | Darrin Borthwick | Simaima Taufa and Zahara Temara | 0 | |
| Canterbury-Bankstown Bulldogs | 3rd | Accor Stadium and Belmore Sports Ground | Mark O'Meley | Tayla Preston | 0 | |
| Cronulla Sharks | 5th | Ocean Protect Stadium | Tony Herman | Tiana Penitani-Gray | 0 | |
| Gold Coast Titans | 7th | Cbus Super Stadium | Karyn Murphy | Georgia Hale | 0 | |
| Newcastle Knights | 7th | McDonald Jones Stadium | Ben Jeffries | Yasmin Meakes | 2 | |
| New Zealand Warriors | 6th | Go Media Stadium and FMG Stadium Waikato | Ronald Griffiths | Apii Nicholls | 0 | |
| North Queensland Cowboys | 5th | Queensland Country Bank Stadium | Ricky Henry | Emma Manzelmann | 0 | |
| Parramatta Eels | 7th | CommBank Stadium and Eric Tweedale Stadium | Steve Georgallis | Vacant | 0 | |
| St. George Illawarra Dragons | 10th | WIN Stadium Jubilee Stadium and Allianz Stadium | Nathan Cross | Vacant | 0 | |
| Sydney Roosters | 10th | Allianz Stadium and Polytec Stadium | John Strange | Isabelle Kelly | 2 | |
| Wests Tigers | 5th | Leichhardt Oval, Campbelltown Sports Stadium, CommBank Stadium and Allianz Stadium | Craig Sandercock | Kezie Apps | 0 | |

Notes:

- New Zealand Warriors joined forces with the Rabbitohs in a NRLW Pathways partnership for season 2026. As part of the agreement, Warriors players who were not picked to play NRLW we eligible to play for the South Sydney Rabbitohs in the Harvey Norman NSW Women's Premiership.

== Ladder ==
A competition ladder will be added here closer to the commencement of the season.

== Scheduling ==
The start, duration, and conclusion of the 2027 season has been influenced by several factors.

- A seven-week preparation period.
- Two weeks of leave.
- A six teams over three weeks final series. Winners of 3rd place versus 6th place and 4th place versus 5th place in Week 1 elimination finals then meet 1st place and 2nd place in Week 2 semi-finals. Winners of the semi-finals meet in the Grand Final in Week 3.
- A three-match Women's State of Origin series to be played on 29 April (Penrith), 12 May (Townsville), and 27 May (Newcastle) 2027.
- The NRL (men's) Grand Final Day, on 3 October 2027.

== Trial matches ==
Trial matches were arranged in the two previous seasons but were not announced until a few weeks prior to their match dates.

== Regular season ==
The draw was announced on 20 November 2026.

The regular season will consist of a grand total of 66 matches.

The schedule includes 27 double-headers with NRL men's matches.

- In all instances the home team is the same.
- The away clubs are the same in 13 instances. This is an improvement on 2026 when zero double-headers had the same away opponent, but short of the 18 such instances in the 2025 season.
- As in 2026, the NRLW game is played prior to the NRL game. In 2025, double-headers had some NRLW games being played second.

There is also a two NRLW game double-header in Round 3 and the two NRLW triple-headers in Magic Round in Round 5. Magic Round returns to Newcastle after being played in Wagga Wagga in 2026.

=== Round 1 ===
| Home | Score | Away | Match information | | | | | |
| Home | Score | Away | Date and time | Format | Venue | Referees | Attendance | Reports |
|---|---|---|---|---|---|---|---|---|
| Sydney Roosters | | Wests Tigers | Thursday 1 July; 7:45 PM | NRLW (Only) | Allianz Stadium | | | |
| Parramatta Eels | | Gold Coast Titans | Saturday 3 July; 12:45 PM | NRLW (Only) | Eric Tweedale Stadium | | | |
| New Zealand Warriors | | Canberra Raiders | Saturday 3 July; 3:15 PM | NRLW (Only) | Go Media Stadium | | | |
| North Queensland Cowboys | | St. George Illawarra Dragons | Saturday 3 July; 5:15 PM | NRLW; NRL | Queensland Country Bank Stadium | | | |
| Brisbane Broncos | | Cronulla-Sutherland Sharks | Sunday 4 July; 12:00 PM | NRLW (Only) | Totally Workwear Stadium | | | |
| Canterbury-Bankstown Bulldogs | | Newcastle Knights | Sunday 4 July; 1:45 PM | NRLW; NRL | Accor Stadium | | | |

=== Round 2 ===
| Home | Score | Away | Match information | | | | | |
| Home | Score | Away | Date and time | Format | Venue | Referees | Attendance | Reports |
|---|---|---|---|---|---|---|---|---|
| St. George Illawarra Dragons | | Parramatta Eels | Thursday 8 July; 7:45 PM | NRLW (Only) | St George Venues Jubilee Stadium | | | |
| Canberra Raiders | | North Queensland Cowboys | Saturday 10 July; 12:45 PM | NRLW; NRL | GIO Stadium | | | |
| Wests Tigers | | Newcastle Knights | Saturday 10 July; 3:15 PM | NRLW (Only) | Campbelltown Sports Ground | | | |
| Brisbane Broncos | | New Zealand Warriors | Saturday 10 July; 5:15 PM | NRLW; NRL | Suncorp Stadium | | | |
| Gold Coast Titans | | Canterbury-Bankstown Bulldogs | Sunday 11 July; 11:45 AM | NRLW; NRL | Cbus Super Stadium | | | |
| Sydney Roosters | | Cronulla-Sutherland Sharks | Sunday 11 July; 1:45 PM | NRLW (Only) | Polytec Stadium | | | |

=== Round 3 ===
| Home | Score | Away | Match information | | | | | |
| Home | Score | Away | Date and time | Format | Venue | Referees | Attendance | Reports |
|---|---|---|---|---|---|---|---|---|
| Sydney Roosters | | Gold Coast Titans | Saturday 17 July; 12:45 PM | NRLW; NRL | Allianz Stadium | | | |
| Canterbury-Bankstown Bulldogs | | Wests Tigers | Saturday 17 July; 3:15 PM | NRLW; NRLW | CommBank Stadium | | | |
| Parramatta Eels | | North Queensland Cowboys | Saturday 17 July; 5:15 PM | NRLW; NRLW | CommBank Stadium | | | |
| St. George Illawarra Dragons | | New Zealand Warriors | Sunday 18 July; 12:00 PM | NRLW (Only) | WIN Stadium | | | |
| Newcastle Knights | | Brisbane Broncos | Sunday 18 July; 1:45 PM | NRLW; NRL | McDonald Jones Stadium | | | |
| Cronulla-Sutherland Sharks | | Canberra Raiders | Sunday 18 July; 6:15 PM | NRLW (Only) | Ocean Protect Stadium | | | |

=== Round 4 ===
| Home | Score | Away | Match information | | | | | |
| Home | Score | Away | Date and time | Format | Venue | Referees | Attendance | Reports |
|---|---|---|---|---|---|---|---|---|
| New Zealand Warriors | | Newcastle Knights | Saturday 24 July; 12:45 PM | NRLW; NRL | One New Zealand Stadium | | | |
| Gold Coast Titans | | North Queensland Cowboys | Saturday 24 July; 3:15 PM | NRLW; NRL | Cbus Super Stadium | | | |
| Canterbury-Bankstown Bulldogs | | Canberra Raiders | Saturday 24 July; 5:15 PM | NRLW; NRL | Accor Stadium | | | |
| Brisbane Broncos | | Sydney Roosters | Sunday 25 July; 11:50 AM | NRLW; NRL | Suncorp Stadium | | | |
| Wests Tigers | | Parramatta Eels | Sunday 25 July; 1:45 PM | NRLW (Only) | Campbelltown Sports Ground | | | |
| Cronulla-Sutherland Sharks | | St. George Illawarra Dragons | Sunday 25 July; 6:15 PM | NRLW (Only) | Ocean Protect Stadium | | | |

=== Round 5 (Magic Round) ===
| Home | Score | Away | Match information | | | | | |
| Home | Score | Away | Date and time | Format | Venue | Referees | Attendance | Reports |
|---|---|---|---|---|---|---|---|---|
| North Queensland Cowboys | | New Zealand Warriors | Saturday 31 July; 11:35 AM | NRLW; NRLW; NRLW | McDonald Jones Stadium | | | |
| Gold Coast Titans | | Wests Tigers | Saturday 31 July; 1:25 PM | NRLW; NRLW; NRLW | McDonald Jones Stadium | | | |
| St. George Illawarra Dragons | | Brisbane Broncos | Saturday 31 July; 3:15 PM | NRLW; NRLW; NRLW | McDonald Jones Stadium | | | |
| Canberra Raiders | | Newcastle Knights | Sunday 1 August; 11:35 AM | NRLW; NRLW; NRLW | McDonald Jones Stadium | | | |
| Sydney Roosters | | Parramatta Eels | Sunday 1 August; 1:25 PM | NRLW; NRLW; NRLW | McDonald Jones Stadium | | | |
| Canterbury-Bankstown Bulldogs | | Cronulla-Sutherland Sharks | Sunday 1 August; 3:15 PM | NRLW; NRLW; NRLW | McDonald Jones Stadium | | | |

=== Round 6 ===
| Home | Score | Away | Match information | | | | | |
| Home | Score | Away | Date and time | Format | Venue | Referees | Attendance | Reports |
|---|---|---|---|---|---|---|---|---|
| Gold Coast Titans | | Cronulla-Sutherland Sharks | Saturday 7 August; 12:45 PM | NRLW; NRL | Cbus Super Stadium | | | |
| Canberra Raiders | | Brisbane Broncos | Saturday 7 August; 3:15 PM | NRLW; NRL | GIO Stadium | | | |
| Parramatta Eels | | New Zealand Warriors | Saturday 7 August; 5:15 PM | NRLW; NRL | CommBank Stadium | | | |
| Wests Tigers | | St. George Illawarra Dragons | Sunday 8 August; 11:50 AM | NRLW; NRL | CommBank Stadium | | | |
| North Queensland Cowboys | | Canterbury-Bankstown Bulldogs | Sunday 8 August; 1:45 PM | NRLW (Only) | Queensland Country Bank Stadium | | | |
| Newcastle Knights | | Sydney Roosters | Sunday 8 August; 6:15 PM | NRLW (Only) | McDonald Jones Stadium | | | |

=== Round 7 ===
| Home | Score | Away | Match information | | | | | |
| Home | Score | Away | Date and time | Format | Venue | Referees | Attendance | Reports |
|---|---|---|---|---|---|---|---|---|
| North Queensland Cowboys | | Brisbane Broncos | Saturday 14 August; 12:45 PM | NRLW; NRL | Queensland Country Bank Stadium | | | |
| Sydney Roosters | | Canberra Raiders | Saturday 14 August; 3:15 PM | NRLW; NRL | Allianz Stadium | | | |
| New Zealand Warriors | | Wests Tigers | Saturday 14 August; 5:15 PM | NRLW (Only) | FMG Stadium Waikato | | | |
| Newcastle Knights | | Gold Coast Titans | Sunday 15 August; 11:50 AM | NRLW; NRL | McDonald Jones Stadium | | | |
| St. George Illawarra Dragons | | Canterbury-Bankstown Bulldogs | Sunday 15 August; 1:45 PM | NRLW; NRL | St George Venues Jubilee Stadium | | | |
| Cronulla-Sutherland Sharks | | Parramatta Eels | Sunday 15 August; 6:15 PM | NRLW (Only) | Ocean Protect Stadium | | | |

=== Round 8 ===
| Home | Score | Away | Match information | | | | | |
| Home | Score | Away | Date and time | Format | Venue | Referees | Attendance | Reports |
|---|---|---|---|---|---|---|---|---|
| Cronulla-Sutherland Sharks | | North Queensland Cowboys | Saturday 21 August; 12:45 PM | NRLW (Only) | Ocean Protect Stadium | | | |
| Brisbane Broncos | | Wests Tigers | Saturday 21 August; 3:15 PM | NRLW; NRL | Suncorp Stadium | | | |
| Canberra Raiders | | Parramatta Eels | Saturday 21 August; 5:15 PM | NRLW (Only) | GIO Stadium | | | |
| Gold Coast Titans | | New Zealand Warriors | Sunday 22 August; 11:50 AM | NRLW; NRL | Cbus Super Stadium | | | |
| Newcastle Knights | | St. George Illawarra Dragons | Sunday 22 August; 1:45 PM | NRLW; NRL | McDonald Jones Stadium | | | |
| Sydney Roosters | | Canterbury-Bankstown Bulldogs | Sunday 22 August; 6:15 PM | NRLW (Only) | Allianz Stadium | | | |

=== Round 9 ===
| Home | Score | Away | Match information | | | | | |
| Home | Score | Away | Date and time | Format | Venue | Referees | Attendance | Reports |
|---|---|---|---|---|---|---|---|---|
| St. George Illawarra Dragons | | Gold Coast Titans | Saturday 28 August; 12:45 PM | NRLW; NRL | St George Venues Jubilee Stadium | | | |
| North Queensland Cowboys | | Sydney Roosters | Saturday 28 August; 3:15 PM | NRLW; NRL | Queensland Country Bank Stadium | | | |
| Wests Tigers | | Canberra Raiders | Saturday 28 August; 5:15 PM | NRLW; NRL | CommBank Stadium | | | |
| Parramatta Eels | | Newcastle Knights | Sunday 29 August; 11:50 AM | NRLW; NRL | CommBank Stadium | | | |
| New Zealand Warriors | | Cronulla-Sutherland Sharks | Sunday 29 August; 1:45 PM | NRLW (Only) | FMG Stadium Waikato | | | |
| Canterbury-Bankstown Bulldogs | | Brisbane Broncos | Sunday 29 August; 6:15 PM | NRLW (Only) | Belmore Sports Ground | | | |

=== Round 10 ===
| Home | Score | Away | Match information | | | | | |
| Home | Score | Away | Date and time | Format | Venue | Referees | Attendance | Reports |
|---|---|---|---|---|---|---|---|---|
| Newcastle Knights | | North Queensland Cowboys | Saturday 4 September; 12:30 PM | NRLW; NRL | McDonald Jones Stadium | | | |
| Brisbane Broncos | | Parramatta Eels | Saturday 4 September; 2:25 PM | NRLW (Only) | Totally Workwear Stadium | | | |
| Wests Tigers | | Cronulla-Sutherland Sharks | Saturday 4 September; 4:20 PM | NRLW (Only) | CommBank Stadium | | | |
| Canberra Raiders | | Gold Coast Titans | Saturday 4 September; 6:05 PM | NRLW (Only) | GIO Stadium | | | |
| Canterbury-Bankstown Bulldogs | | New Zealand Warriors | Sunday 5 September; 12:00 PM | NRLW (Only) | Belmore Sports Ground | | | |
| St. George Illawarra Dragons | | Sydney Roosters | Sunday 5 September; 1:45 PM | NRLW (Only) | WIN Stadium | | | |

=== Round 11 ===
| Home | Score | Away | Match information | | | | | |
| Home | Score | Away | Date and time | Format | Venue | Referees | Attendance | Reports |
|---|---|---|---|---|---|---|---|---|
| Gold Coast Titans | | Brisbane Broncos | Thursday 9 September; 7:45 PM | NRLW (Only) | Cbus Super Stadium | | | |
| Parramatta Eels | | Canterbury-Bankstown Bulldogs | Friday 10 September; 5:40 PM | NRLW (Only) | CommBank Stadium | | | |
| New Zealand Warriors | | Sydney Roosters | Saturday 11 September; 12:45 PM | NRLW (Only) | To be advised | | | |
| North Queensland Cowboys | | Wests Tigers | Saturday 11 September; 3:15 PM | NRLW (Only) | Queensland Country Bank Stadium | | | |
| Canberra Raiders | | St. George Illawarra Dragons | Sunday 12 September; 12:45 PM | NRLW (Only) | GIO Stadium | | | |
| Cronulla-Sutherland Sharks | | Newcastle Knights | Sunday 12 September; 3:15 PM | NRLW (Only) | Ocean Protect Stadium | | | |

== Finals series ==
The order and dates of the week one fixtures will be confirmed at the conclusion of the regular season.

=== Week 1 ===
| Home | Score | Away | Match information | | | | | |
| Home | Score | Away | Date and time | Format | Venue | Referees | Attendance | Reports |
|---|---|---|---|---|---|---|---|---|
| 3rd place | | 6th place | | | | | | |
| 4th place | | 5th place | | | | | | |

=== Week 2 ===
| Home | Score | Away | Match information | | | | | |
| Home | Score | Away | Date and time | Format | Venue | Referees | Attendance | Reports |
|---|---|---|---|---|---|---|---|---|
| 1st place | | Lowest-placed winner from week one | | | | | | |
| 2nd place | | Highest-placed winner from week one | | | | | | |

=== Grand Final ===
| Home | Score | Away | Match information | | | | | |
| Home | Score | Away | Date and time | Format | Venue | Referees | Attendance | Reports |

== Individual awards ==
This section will be expanded at the conclusion of the season.

== Players and transfers ==
The 2027 season salary cap for clubs is $1,518,000 and the minimum wage for contracted players is $50,600. Squad size is 24 players plus 2 supplementary players and 4 development players. In the recent seasons of 2023, 2024, 205, and 2026, clubs were required to fill their 24-player roster by late May.
Players may be added to each club's roster from outside the initial squad of 24 as injury replacements. This can be to cover season-ending injuries or a significant number of short-term injuries.

=== Transfers ===
Table last updated: 18 November 2026

2027 NRLW transfers
| Player | 2026 club | 2027 club | Length of deal (years) | Announcement date | Reference |
|---|---|---|---|---|---|
| Tori Shipton | St George Illawarra Dragons (Sup) | Newcastle Knights | 2 | 15 Jan 2026 | |
| Emma Verran | Cronulla-Sutherland Sharks (Pregnancy) | St George Illawarra Dragons | 3 | 12 Feb 2026 | |
| Alexis Tauaneai | Canterbury-Bankstown Bulldogs | St George Illawarra Dragons | 2 | 19 Mar 2026 | |
| Angelina Teakaraanga-Katoa | Canterbury-Bankstown Bulldogs | St George Illawarra Dragons | 1 | 20 Mar 2026 | |
| Destiny Mino-Sinapati | Gold Coast Titans | Brisbane Broncos | 2 | 7 Aug 2026 | |
| Teagan Berry | St George Illawarra Dragons | Cronulla-Sutherland Sharks | 2 | 22 Sep 2026 | |
| Zali Hopkins | St George Illawarra Dragons | North Queensland Cowboys | 3 | 30 Sep 2026 | |
| Mamele Misa | Souths Logan Magpies | Parramatta Eels | 2 | 8 Oct 2026 | |
| Rima Butler | Sydney Roosters | Wests Tigers | 3 | 12 Oct 2026 | |
| Martha Mataele | Parramatta Eels | Brisbane Broncos | 2 | 15 Oct 2026 | |
| Jayme Millard | St George Illawarra Dragons | Wests Tigers | 2 | 15 Oct 2026 | |
| Sara Sautia | St George Illawarra Dragons | North Queensland Cowboys | 2 | 15 Oct 2026 | |
| Amanii Misa | Brisbane Broncos | North Queensland Cowboys | 3 | 15 Oct 2026 | |
| Makenzie Weale | North Queensland Cowboys | St George Illawarra Dragons | 3 | 16 Oct 2026 | |
| Sereana Naitokatoka | Canberra Raiders | Wests Tigers | 3 | 20 Oct 2026 | |
| Anastasia Leatupue | Sydney Roosters (Dev) | Wests Tigers | 3 | 20 Oct 2026 | |
| Ashleigh Quinlan | Bulldogs | North Queensland Cowboys | 2 | 21 Oct 2026 | |
| Chelsea Savill | St George Illawarra Dragons (Dev) | York Valkyrie | 1 | 4 Nov 2026 | |
| Mercedez Taulelei-Siala | Newcastle Knights | Canterbury-Bankstown Bulldogs | 2 | 6 Nov 2026 | |
| Brooke Anderson | St George Illawarra Dragons | Cronulla-Sutherland Sharks | 2 | 11 Nov 2026 | |
| Rosie Kelly | North Queensland Cowboys | Canterbury-Bankstown Bulldogs | 3 | 12 Nov 2026 | |
| Chloe Pallisier | Penrith Panthers | St George Illawarra Dragons (Sup) | 2 | 18 Nov 2026 | |
