= List of National Rugby League golden point games =

The golden point, a sudden death overtime system, is used to resolve drawn rugby league matches in the National Rugby League, Australasia's top competition in the sport. The term is borrowed from the golden goal system formerly employed in association football. The golden point is used to determine a winner when scores are level at the end of regular time. Prior to its introduction into the National Rugby League competition at the beginning of the 2003 season, normal season games were left as draws; in finals matches, 20 minutes extra time ensued (10 minutes each way), with a replay in the event of a draw. If the scores are level at the end of 80 minutes, five minutes are played, the teams swap ends with no break, and a further five minutes are played. Any score (try, penalty goal, or field goal) in this 10-minute period secures a win for the scoring team, and the game ends at that point. If the scoring event is a try, no conversion is attempted. If no further scoring occurs, the game is drawn and each team receives one competition point.

As of 12 July 2026, 182 golden point games have been played, with 19 remaining a draw after the ten minutes of golden point extra-time. Daly Cherry-Evans has scored the winning points on seven occasions, more than anyone in the NRL, while Nathan Cleary has scored the winning points on five occasions, followed by Johnathan Thurston, Valentine Holmes, Jamayne Isaako, and Shaun Johnson all behind on four. The Penrith Panthers and North Queensland Cowboys have played the most golden point games with 29, while the Dolphins have played the least with six since entering the competition in 2023. The Canterbury-Bankstown Bulldogs are the most successful team under the format, having won 14 of their 18 golden point matches (including a draw), whilst the Newcastle Knights are the worst, having won just four of their 20 matches. The St. George Illawarra Dragons were the final club to win their first golden point match, after five previous failed attempts. The New Zealand Warriors have featured in the most drawn matches with five.

The two teams that have met each other the most times in golden point games are the Penrith Panthers and the North Queensland Cowboys, with a total of five match-ups. Four of the games were played in Townsville while only one was played in Penrith. The results are evenly spread, each team winning two games and their most recent game resulting in a draw.

The first golden point game in a grand final occurred in 2015, between the Brisbane Broncos and the North Queensland Cowboys, which was won 17–16 by the Cowboys after a Johnathan Thurston field goal sealed the win and a first premiership title for the Cowboys.

Following the 2015 NRL Grand Final the rules for tied NRL finals matches reverted to two five minute periods of extra-time, followed by golden point extra time if required.

The first golden point game in a NRL Women's Premiership match occurred during the fifth season of the competition in 2022, with Rachael Pearson of the St. George Illawarra Dragons scoring a field goal to defeat the Brisbane Broncos 19–18.

== List of golden point matches ==
Key to list
Drawn games
Finals match
Grand Final

#	Home	Score	Away	Date	Venue	Golden point(s) scorer	Ref
1	Manly Warringah Sea Eagles	36–34	Parramatta Eels	18 May 2003	Brookvale Oval	Ben Walker	
2	North Queensland Cowboys	24–28	Penrith Panthers	7 June 2003	Dairy Farmers Stadium	Joe Galuvao	
3	South Sydney Rabbitohs	30–31	New Zealand Warriors	29 June 2003	Aussie Stadium	Stacey Jones	
4	Melbourne Storm	22–26	Brisbane Broncos	20 July 2003	Olympic Park	Scott Minto	
5	South Sydney Rabbitohs	17–16	Wests Tigers	21 March 2004	Aussie Stadium	Willie Peters	
6	Parramatta Eels	14–18	Cronulla-Sutherland Sharks	24 April 2004	Parramatta Stadium	Nigel Vagana	
7	Brisbane Broncos	16–17	Newcastle Knights	14 May 2004	Suncorp Stadium	Kurt Gidley	
8	South Sydney Rabbitohs	20–20	North Queensland Cowboys	15 May 2004	Bluetongue Stadium	None	
9	New Zealand Warriors	26–28	North Queensland Cowboys	20 June 2004	Ericsson Stadium	Josh Hannay	
10	Newcastle Knights	24–28	North Queensland Cowboys	25 July 2004	EnergyAustralia Stadium	Travis Norton	
11	Canberra Raiders	30–29	New Zealand Warriors	25 July 2004	Canberra Stadium	Clinton Schifcofske	
12	Cronulla-Sutherland Sharks	12–16	Brisbane Broncos	31 July 2004	Toyota Park	Brent Tate	
13	South Sydney Rabbitohs	34–34	Brisbane Broncos	31 August 2004	Aussie Stadium	None	
14	Canterbury-Bankstown Bulldogs	21–21	South Sydney Rabbitohs	4 June 2005	Sydney Showground	None	
15	Cronulla-Sutherland Sharks	30–26	Newcastle Knights	16 July 2005	Toyota Park	Vince Mellars	
16	St. George Illawarra Dragons	12–13	Penrith Panthers	19 March 2006	WIN Stadium	Preston Campbell	
17	Canberra Raiders	21–20	Penrith Panthers	1 April 2006	Canberra Stadium	Clinton Schifcofske	
18	North Queensland Cowboys	14–15	Canberra Raiders	27 May 2006	Dairy Farmers Stadium	Todd Carney	
19	Melbourne Storm	17–16	Penrith Panthers	28 May 2006	Olympic Park	Cooper Cronk	
20	Canterbury-Bankstown Bulldogs	22–18	New Zealand Warriors	9 July 2006	Telstra Stadium	Mark O'Meley	
21	Canberra Raiders	20–18	Wests Tigers	16 July 2006	Canberra Stadium	Clinton Schifcofske	
22	Wests Tigers	18–19	Canberra Raiders	13 August 2006	Campbelltown Stadium	Todd Carney	
23	Parramatta Eels	22–20	Wests Tigers	30 March 2007	Parramatta Stadium	Luke Burt	
24	Brisbane Broncos	28–29	Penrith Panthers	30 March 2007	Suncorp Stadium	Peter Wallace	
25	Wests Tigers	14–12	Cronulla-Sutherland Sharks	15 April 2007	Campbelltown Stadium	Benji Marshall	
26	Cronulla-Sutherland Sharks	12–13	Sydney Roosters	26 May 2007	Toyota Park	Anthony Minichiello	
27	Brisbane Broncos	19–18	Gold Coast Titans	6 July 2007	Suncorp Stadium	Darren Lockyer	
28	Sydney Roosters	31–31	New Zealand Warriors	5 August 2007	Sydney Football Stadium	None	
29	Wests Tigers	22–26	Sydney Roosters	10 August 2007	Telstra Stadium	Joel Monaghan	
30	Parramatta Eels	24–25	Cronulla-Sutherland Sharks	11 August 2007	Parramatta Stadium	Brett Seymour	
31	Penrith Panthers	26–30	North Queensland Cowboys	13 August 2007	CUA Stadium	Ashley Graham	
32	Newcastle Knights	13–12	Manly Warringah Sea Eagles	22 March 2008	EnergyAustralia Stadium	Scott Dureau	
33	Parramatta Eels	24–23	Newcastle Knights	28 March 2008	Parramatta Stadium	Luke Burt	
34	St. George Illawarra Dragons	16–18	Cronulla-Sutherland Sharks	5 April 2008	ANZ Stadium	Luke Covell	
35	Cronulla-Sutherland Sharks	20–21	Penrith Panthers	19 April 2008	Toyota Park	Jarrod Sammut	
36	North Queensland Cowboys	18–19	Penrith Panthers	31 May 2008	Dairy Farmers Stadium	Jarrod Sammut	
37	Penrith Panthers	12–12	Brisbane Broncos	27 June 2008	CUA Stadium	None	
38	Bulldogs	30–34	South Sydney Rabbitohs	7 July 2008	ANZ Stadium	Luke Capewell	
39	Brisbane Broncos	25–21	Gold Coast Titans	22 August 2008	Suncorp Stadium	Greg Eastwood	
40	Melbourne Storm	17–16	St. George Illawarra Dragons	13 March 2009	Olympic Park	Greg Inglis	
41	New Zealand Warriors	17–16	Sydney Roosters	19 April 2009	Mt Smart Stadium	Stacey Jones	
42	Melbourne Storm	14–14	New Zealand Warriors	25 April 2009	Olympic Park	None	
43	Parramatta Eels	16–16	South Sydney Rabbitohs	22 May 2009	ANZ Stadium	None	
44	Penrith Panthers	32–32	New Zealand Warriors	1 August 2009	CUA Stadium	None	
45	South Sydney Rabbitohs	18–19	Gold Coast Titans	19 March 2010	ANZ Stadium	Scott Prince	
46	North Queensland Cowboys	19–20	Cronulla-Sutherland Sharks	26 June 2010	Dairy Farmers Stadium	Trent Barrett	
47	St. George Illawarra Dragons	10–11	Gold Coast Titans	23 July 2010	WIN Jubilee Oval	Mat Rogers	
48	North Queensland Cowboys	28–24	Newcastle Knights	24 July 2010	Dairy Farmers Stadium	Will Tupou	
49	South Sydney Rabbitohs	34–30	Wests Tigers	7 August 2010	ANZ Stadium	Dylan Farrell	
50	Wests Tigers	15–19	Sydney Roosters	11 September 2010	Sydney Football Stadium	Shaun Kenny-Dowall	
51	Canberra Raiders	22–23	Gold Coast Titans	2 April 2011	Canberra Stadium	Greg Bird	
52	Parramatta Eels	14–14	St. George Illawarra Dragons	3 June 2011	Parramatta Stadium	None	
53	Wests Tigers	17–16	Newcastle Knights	6 June 2011	Leichhardt Oval	Robbie Farah	
54	Brisbane Broncos	25–24	Canberra Raiders	12 June 2011	Suncorp Stadium	Peter Wallace	
55	Penrith Panthers	23–22	Parramatta Eels	16 July 2011	Centrebet Stadium	Luke Walsh	
56	South Sydney Rabbitohs	21–20	Sydney Roosters	16 July 2011	ANZ Stadium	Chris Sandow	
57	Canterbury-Bankstown Bulldogs	8–7	Parramatta Eels	22 July 2011	ANZ Stadium	Trent Hodkinson	
58	South Sydney Rabbitohs	26–24	North Queensland Cowboys	19 August 2011	ANZ Stadium	Chris Sandow	
59	Parramatta Eels	12–13	Sydney Roosters	26 August 2011	Parramatta Stadium	Braith Anasta	
60	Brisbane Broncos	13–12	St. George Illawarra Dragons	17 September 2011	Suncorp Stadium	Darren Lockyer	
61	Newcastle Knights	14–15	St. George Illawarra Dragons	1 March 2012	Hunter Stadium	Jamie Soward	
62	Wests Tigers	17–16	Cronulla-Sutherland Sharks	4 March 2012	Leichhardt Oval	Benji Marshall	
63	Wests Tigers	16–17	South Sydney Rabbitohs	1 April 2012	Allianz Stadium	Greg Inglis	
64	Gold Coast Titans	14–15	Wests Tigers	5 May 2012	Skilled Park	Robbie Farah	
65	Penrith Panthers	13–12	St. George Illawarra Dragons	14 May 2012	Centrebet Stadium	Lachlan Coote	
66	St. George Illawarra Dragons	18–19	South Sydney Rabbitohs	20 May 2012	WIN Jubilee Oval	Adam Reynolds	
67	Penrith Panthers	18–19	Parramatta Eels	23 June 2012	Centrebet Stadium	Chris Sandow	
68	Cronulla-Sutherland Sharks	14–14	Sydney Roosters	9 July 2012	Toyota Stadium	None	
69	Cronulla-Sutherland Sharks	20–21	Penrith Panthers	28 July 2012	Toyota Stadium	Luke Walsh	
70	Canterbury-Bankstown Bulldogs	23–22	Wests Tigers	17 August 2012	ANZ Stadium	Krisnan Inu	
71	Newcastle Knights	20–21	Cronulla-Sutherland Sharks	5 May 2013	Hunter Stadium	Jeff Robson	
72	Melbourne Storm	10–10	Manly Warringah Sea Eagles	20 May 2013	AAMI Park	None	
73	Manly Warringah Sea Eagles	30–32	Canterbury-Bankstown Bulldogs	14 June 2013	Brookvale Oval	Trent Hodkinson	
74	South Sydney Rabbitohs	18–22	St. George Illawarra Dragons	22 July 2013	ANZ Stadium	Brett Morris	
75	Newcastle Knights	18–18	Brisbane Broncos	2 August 2013	Hunter Stadium	None	
76	Melbourne Storm	23–22	Gold Coast Titans	7 September 2013	AAMI Park	Cooper Cronk	
77	Manly Warringah Sea Eagles	22–23	Melbourne Storm	8 March 2014	Brookvale Oval	Cameron Smith	
78	North Queensland Cowboys	20–19	Cronulla-Sutherland Sharks	1 September 2014	1300SMILES Stadium	Johnathan Thurston	
79	Gold Coast Titans	19–18	Canterbury-Bankstown Bulldogs	7 September 2014	Cbus Super Stadium	William Zillman	
80	Manly Warringah Sea Eagles	17–18	Canterbury-Bankstown Bulldogs	20 September 2014	Allianz Stadium	Trent Hodkinson	
81	Wests Tigers	24–25	Canterbury-Bankstown Bulldogs	27 March 2015	ANZ Stadium	Moses Mbye	
82	North Queensland Cowboys	18–17	Melbourne Storm	30 March 2015	1300SMILES Stadium	Johnathan Thurston	
83	Brisbane Broncos	22–18	Sydney Roosters	10 April 2015	Suncorp Stadium	Ben Hunt	
84	Parramatta Eels	13–17	New Zealand Warriors	16 May 2015	Pirtek Stadium	Bodene Thompson	
85	Gold Coast Titans	22–23	Cronulla-Sutherland Sharks	16 May 2015	Cbus Super Stadium	Valentine Holmes	
86	Canberra Raiders	20–21	Cronulla-Sutherland Sharks	18 July 2015	GIO Stadium	Valentine Holmes	
87	St. George Illawarra Dragons	32–30	Wests Tigers	5 September 2015	ANZ Stadium	Josh Dugan	
88	Parramatta Eels	24–28	Canberra Raiders	6 September 2015	Pirtek Stadium	Josh Hodgson	
89	Canterbury-Bankstown Bulldogs	11–10	St. George Illawarra Dragons	12 September 2015	ANZ Stadium	Josh Reynolds	
90	Brisbane Broncos	16–17	North Queensland Cowboys	4 October 2015	ANZ Stadium	Johnathan Thurston	
91	Newcastle Knights	24–24	Canberra Raiders	19 March 2016	Hunter Stadium	None	
92	Brisbane Broncos	21–20	North Queensland Cowboys	25 March 2016	Suncorp Stadium	Anthony Milford	
93	Sydney Roosters	28–32	New Zealand Warriors	3 April 2016	Central Coast Stadium	Roger Tuivasa-Sheck	
94	Wests Tigers	18–19	Melbourne Storm	17 April 2016	Leichhardt Oval	Cooper Cronk	
95	Canterbury-Bankstown Bulldogs	21–20	Gold Coast Titans	23 April 2016	ANZ Stadium	Josh Reynolds	
96	St. George Illawarra Dragons	16–12	Canberra Raiders	12 May 2016	Jubilee Oval	Euan Aitken	
97	South Sydney Rabbitohs	28–29	Gold Coast Titans	5 June 2016	nib Stadium	Ashley Taylor	
98	Cronulla-Sutherland Sharks	19–18	New Zealand Warriors	25 June 2016	Southern Cross Group Stadium	James Maloney	
99	Canberra Raiders	29–25	Newcastle Knights	3 July 2016	GIO Stadium	Jordan Rapana	
100	Manly Warringah Sea Eagles	15–14	New Zealand Warriors	16 July 2016	nib stadium	Daly Cherry-Evans	
101	Canberra Raiders	26–22	New Zealand Warriors	24 July 2016	GIO Stadium	Jarrod Croker	
102	New Zealand Warriors	20–16	Penrith Panthers	30 July 2016	Mount Smart Stadium	Shaun Johnson	
103	Gold Coast Titans	18–18	Cronulla-Sutherland Sharks	1 August 2016	Cbus Super Stadium	None	
104	Melbourne Storm	15–14	South Sydney Rabbitohs	6 August 2016	AAMI Park	Cameron Smith	
105	Canterbury-Bankstown Bulldogs	20–16	Manly Warringah Sea Eagles	11 August 2016	ANZ Stadium	Josh Reynolds	
106	North Queensland Cowboys	20–16	Canberra Raiders	4 March 2017	1300SMILES Stadium	Gavin Cooper	
107	Brisbane Broncos	20–21	North Queensland Cowboys	10 March 2017	Suncorp Stadium	Johnathan Thurston	
108	Canberra Raiders	18–20	Manly Warringah Sea Eagles	21 April 2017	GIO Stadium	Dylan Walker	
109	Sydney Roosters	13–12	St. George Illawarra Dragons	25 April 2017	Allianz Stadium	Mitchell Pearce	
110	Manly Warringah Sea Eagles	21–20	Canberra Raiders	4 June 2017	Lottoland	Daly Cherry-Evans	
111	Melbourne Storm	23–22	North Queensland Cowboys	17 June 2017	AAMI Park	Brodie Croft	
112	Sydney Roosters	25–24	Melbourne Storm	24 June 2017	Adelaide Oval	Mitchell Pearce	
113	Parramatta Eels	13–12	Canterbury-Bankstown Bulldogs	29 June 2017	ANZ Stadium	Mitchell Moses	
114	Canberra Raiders	18–14	St. George Illawarra Dragons	14 July 2017	GIO Stadium	Elliot Whitehead	
115	New Zealand Warriors	21–22	Manly Warringah Sea Eagles	27 August 2017	Mt. Smart Stadium	Daly Cherry-Evans	
116	Newcastle Knights	19–18	Manly Warringah Sea Eagles	9 March 2018	McDonald Jones Stadium	Mitchell Pearce	
117	Wests Tigers	7–9	Brisbane Broncos	23 March 2018	Campbelltown Stadium	Jamayne Isaako	
118	Cronulla-Sutherland Sharks	32–33	Manly Warringah Sea Eagles	5 August 2018	Southern Cross Group Stadium	Daly Cherry-Evans	
119	Gold Coast Titans	16–17	Penrith Panthers	11 August 2018	Cbus Super Stadium	Nathan Cleary	
120	Penrith Panthers	9–8	Wests Tigers	5 April 2019	Panthers Stadium	Nathan Cleary	
121	Manly Warringah Sea Eagles	13–12	South Sydney Rabbitohs	6 April 2019	Lottoland	Daly Cherry-Evans	
122	Newcastle Knights	12–13	St. George Illawarra Dragons	7 April 2019	McDonald Jones Stadium	Corey Norman	
123	Melbourne Storm	20–21	Sydney Roosters	19 April 2019	AAMI Park	Latrell Mitchell	
124	North Queensland Cowboys	26–27	Wests Tigers	15 June 2019	1300SMILES Stadium	Benji Marshall	
125	New Zealand Warriors	18–19	Penrith Panthers	30 June 2019	Mt. Smart Stadium	James Maloney	
126	Brisbane Broncos	18–18	New Zealand Warriors	13 July 2019	Suncorp Stadium	None	
127	Melbourne Storm	10–11	Manly Warringah Sea Eagles	27 July 2019	AAMI Park	Daly Cherry-Evans	
128	Brisbane Broncos	17–16	Parramatta Eels	30 August 2019	Suncorp Stadium	Jamayne Isaako	
129	Cronulla-Sutherland Sharks	14–15	Canberra Raiders	1 September 2019	PointsBet Stadium	Aidan Sezer	
130	Penrith Panthers	14–14	Newcastle Knights	31 May 2020	Campbelltown Stadium	None	
131	Parramatta Eels	25–24	Canberra Raiders	27 June 2020	Bankwest Stadium	Clinton Gutherson	
132	Melbourne Storm	27–25	Sydney Roosters	2 July 2020	Suncorp Stadium	Cameron Smith	
133	North Queensland Cowboys	23–22	St. George Illawarra Dragons	6 September 2020	Queensland Country Bank Stadium	Valentine Holmes	
134	South Sydney Rabbitohs	18–14	Wests Tigers	17 April 2021	Stadium Australia	Tom Burgess	
135	Cronulla-Sutherland Sharks	13–12	St. George Illawarra Dragons	21 May 2021	Netstrata Jubilee Stadium	Chad Townsend	
136	New Zealand Warriors	18–19	St. George Illawarra Dragons	2 July 2021	Central Coast Stadium	Corey Norman	
137	Melbourne Storm	15–14	South Sydney Rabbitohs	17 March 2022	AAMI Park	Ryan Papenhuyzen	
138	Melbourne Storm	24–28	Parramatta Eels	26 March 2022	AAMI Park	Ray Stone	
139	New Zealand Warriors	25–24	North Queensland Cowboys	8 April 2022	Moreton Daily Stadium	Shaun Johnson	
140	New Zealand Warriors	21–20	Canberra Raiders	30 April 2022	Moreton Daily Stadium	Shaun Johnson	
141	Gold Coast Titans	20–16	St. George Illawarra Dragons	14 May 2022	Suncorp Stadium	Jamayne Isaako	
142	Cronulla-Sutherland Sharks	21–20	South Sydney Rabbitohs	30 July 2022	PointsBet Stadium	Nicho Hynes	
143	New Zealand Warriors	26–27	Gold Coast Titans	3 September 2022	Mount Smart Stadium	Tanah Boyd	
144	Cronulla-Sutherland Sharks	30–32	North Queensland Cowboys	10 September 2022	PointsBet Stadium	Valentine Holmes	
145	Parramatta Eels	12–16	Melbourne Storm	2 March 2023	CommBank Stadium	Harry Grant	
146	Parramatta Eels	17–16	Penrith Panthers	23 March 2023	CommBank Stadium	Mitchell Moses	
147	South Sydney Rabbitohs	13–12	Manly Warringah Sea Eagles	25 March 2023	Accor Stadium	Lachlan Ilias	
148	Manly Warringah Sea Eagles	32–32	Newcastle Knights	1 April 2023	Glen Willow Oval	None	
149	Canterbury-Bankstown Bulldogs	15–14	North Queensland Cowboys	2 April 2023	Accor Stadium	Matt Burton	
150	Newcastle Knights	15–16	Penrith Panthers	15 April 2023	McDonald Jones Stadium	Nathan Cleary	
151	Canberra Raiders	31–30	Dolphins	29 April 2023	McDonald's Park	Jamal Fogarty	
152	North Queensland Cowboys	27–23	Penrith Panthers	16 June 2023	Queensland Country Bank Stadium	Scott Drinkwater	
153	Gold Coast Titans	21–23	Dolphins	9 July 2023	Cbus Super Stadium	Jamayne Isaako	
154	New Zealand Warriors	21–20	Canberra Raiders	21 July 2023	Go Media Stadium	Shaun Johnson	
155	North Queensland Cowboys	21–20	Newcastle Knights	16 March 2024	Queensland Country Bank Stadium	Chad Townsend	
156	New Zealand Warriors	22–22	Manly Warringah Sea Eagles	13 April 2024	Go Media Stadium	None	
157	Canberra Raiders	21–20	Gold Coast Titans	14 April 2024	GIO Stadium	Jamal Fogarty	
158	Dolphins	25–26	Canberra Raiders	1 June 2024	Kayo Stadium	Jordan Rapana	
159	Canterbury-Bankstown Bulldogs	15–14	Cronulla-Sutherland Sharks	28 June 2024	Accor Stadium	Matt Burton	
160	Canterbury-Bankstown Bulldogs	13–12	New Zealand Warriors	6 July 2024	Accor Stadium	Matt Burton	
161	North Queensland Cowboys	20–21	Manly Warringah Sea Eagles	6 July 2024	Queensland Country Bank Stadium	Daly Cherry-Evans	
162	Penrith Panthers	28–26	Dolphins	21 July 2024	Bluebet Stadium	Nathan Cleary	
163	Dolphins	34–32	New Zealand Warriors	11 August 2024	Suncorp Stadium	Sean O'Sullivan	
164	Cronulla-Sutherland Sharks	19–18	Newcastle Knights	18 August 2024	Pointsbet Stadium	Daniel Atkinson	
165	Parramatta Eels	23–22	St. George Illawarra Dragons	5 April 2025	CommBank Stadium	Zac Lomax	
166	New Zealand Warriors	20–18	Brisbane Broncos	19 April 2025	Go Media Stadium	Luke Metcalf	
167	Wests Tigers	20–18	Cronulla-Sutherland Sharks	27 April 2025	Leichhardt Oval	Adam Doueihi	
168	Melbourne Storm	18–20	Canberra Raiders	4 May 2025	Suncorp Stadium	Jamal Fogarty	
169	North Queensland Cowboys	30–30	Penrith Panthers	10 May 2025	Queensland Country Bank Stadium	None	
170	Newcastle Knights	26–22	Manly Warringah Sea Eagles	5 June 2025	McDonald Jones Stadium	Kalyn Ponga	
171	South Sydney Rabbitohs	24–25	Melbourne Storm	21 June 2025	Accor Stadium	Ryan Papenhuyzen	
172	Gold Coast Titans	26–30	Penrith Panthers	2 August 2025	Cbus Super Stadium	Blaize Talagi	
173	Penrith Panthers	18–22	Melbourne Storm	14 August 2025	CommBank Stadium	Harry Grant	
174	Penrith Panthers	16–20	Canberra Raiders	22 August 2025	Glen Willow Oval	Kaeo Weekes	
175	Canberra Raiders	28–29	Brisbane Broncos	14 September 2025	GIO Stadium	Ben Hunt	
176	Canterbury-Bankstown Bulldogs	15–14	St. George Illawarra Dragons	28 February 2026 (Note: Local time in Las Vegas.)	Allegiant Stadium	Stephen Crichton	
177	Manly Warringah Sea Eagles	28–29	Canberra Raiders	7 March 2026	4 Pines Park	Ethan Sanders	
178	Parramatta Eels	20–22	Wests Tigers	6 April 2026	CommBank Stadium	Jock Madden	
179	Dolphins	22–23	Penrith Panthers	17 April 2026	TIO Stadium	Nathan Cleary	
180	North Queensland Cowboys	30–33	Parramatta Eels	8 May 2026	Queensland Country Bank Stadium	Mitchell Moses (Note: Moses kicked a field goal to win the game but was awarded a penalty for pressure on the kicker. Ronald Volkman kicked the subsequent goal, the first ever instance of two scoring actions taking place in a golden point game.)	
181	Canterbury-Bankstown Bulldogs	13–12	Manly Warringah Sea Eagles	20 June 2026	Accor Stadium	Stephen Crichton	
182	Manly Warringah Sea Eagles	18–19	North Queensland Cowboys	12 July 2026	4 Pines Park	Scott Drinkwater	

== Tally ==
Pos	Team	Pld	W	D	L	PF	PA	PD	PCT
1	Canterbury-Bankstown Bulldogs	18	14	1	3	332	317	+15	.806
2	Brisbane Broncos	20	11	4	5	402	384	+18	.650
3	Melbourne Storm	21	12	2	7	401	396	+5	.619
4	Canberra Raiders	28	16	1	11	616	601	+15	.589
5	Penrith Panthers	29	15	4	10	589	595	−6	.586
6	Sydney Roosters	14	7	2	5	282	281	+1	.571
7	North Queensland Cowboys	29	15	2	12	664	647	+17	.552
8	South Sydney Rabbitohs	22	9	4	9	468	461	+7	.500
9	Cronulla-Sutherland Sharks	25	11	2	12	486	486	0	.480
10	Manly Warringah Sea Eagles	23	9	3	11	463	470	−7	.457
11	Parramatta Eels	22	9	2	11	432	442	−10	.455
12	New Zealand Warriors	26	9	5	12	575	576	−1	.442
13	Gold Coast Titans	18	7	1	10	366	373	−7	.417
14	Dolphins	6	2	0	4	160	161	−1	.333
15	Wests Tigers	22	7	0	15	410	431	−21	.318
16	St. George Illawarra Dragons	21	6	1	14	337	345	−8	.310
17	Newcastle Knights	20	4	4	12	400	417	−17	.300

Updated to match(es) played on 12 July 2026. Source: Rugby League Tables

=== Statistics ===
Method of golden point result
Rank	Scoring play	Total
1	1–point field goal	109 (Note: In the 180th golden point game, Mitchell Moses kicked a field goal to win the game but was awarded a penalty for pressure on the kicker. The subsequent goal was the first ever instance of two scoring actions taking place in a golden point game, but the field goal is considered as the winning play.)
2	Try	35
3	No score (draw)	19
4	Penalty goal	16
5	2–point field goal	3

Note: 2–point field goals introduced from 2021 NRL season

Key
^	Active NRL player.

Multiple golden point scorers
Rank	Player	Method				Total
Rank	Player	Try	2pt	1pt	PG	Total
1	Daly Cherry-Evans^	0	0	7	0	7
2	Nathan Cleary^	0	1	4	0	5
=3	Johnathan Thurston	0	0	4	0	4
=3	Valentine Holmes^	0	1	3	0	4
=3	Jamayne Isaako^	1	0	1	2	4
=3	Shaun Johnson	1	0	3	0	4
=7	Clinton Schifcofske	0	0	2	1	3
=7	Chris Sandow	0	0	2	1	3
=7	Trent Hodkinson	0	0	2	1	3
=7	Cooper Cronk	0	0	3	0	3
=7	Josh Reynolds	1	0	2	0	3
=7	Mitchell Pearce	0	0	3	0	3
=7	Benji Marshall	0	0	2	1	3
=7	Cameron Smith	0	0	2	1	3
=7	Matt Burton^	0	0	3	0	3
=7	Jamal Fogarty^	0	0	2	1	3
=7	Mitchell Moses^	0	0	3	0	3

Note: Minimum three golden point scores.

== List of NRLW golden point games ==
Key to list
Drawn games
Finals match
Grand Final

#	Home	Score	Away	Date	Venue	Golden point(s) scorer
1	Brisbane Broncos	18–19	St George Illawarra Dragons	10 September 2022	AAMI Park	Rachael Pearson
2	Brisbane Broncos	16–17	Gold Coast Titans	27 July 2023	The Gabba	Lauren Brown
3	St George Illawarra Dragons	18–19	Canberra Raiders	12 August 2023	WIN Stadium	Zahara Temara
4	Gold Coast Titans	14–14	Canterbury-Bankstown Bulldogs	2 August 2025	McDonald Jones Stadium	None
5	Canberra Raiders	17–16	Wests Tigers	30 August 2025	GIO Stadium	Zahara Temara
6	Cronulla Sharks	19–18	Newcastle Knights	31 August 2025	Sharks Stadium	Chantay Kiria-Ratu
7	Gold Coast Titans	17–16	Canberra Raiders	13 September 2025	Cbus Super Stadium	Lauren Brown
