= Grace Kemp =

Australia international rugby union & league player

- Born: 8 June 2001 (age 25) Goulburn, NSW
- Height: 1.85 m (6 ft 1 in)
- Weight: 98 kg (15 st 6 lb)
- School: Canberra Girls Grammar School

Rugby union career
- Position(s): No. 8, Lock
Senior career
Years	Team	Apps	(Points)
	Brumbies		(0)
International career
Years	Team	Apps	(Points)
2022	Australia	1	(0)
- Rugby league career

Playing information
- Position: Prop
Club
Years	Team	Pld	T	G	FG	P
2023–	Canberra Raiders	39	5	0	0	20
Representative
Years	Team	Pld	T	G	FG	P
2024	Prime Minister's XIII	1	0	0	0	0
2024	New South Wales	3	0	0	0	0
2024–26	Indigenous All Stars	3	0	0	0	0
- As of 13 November 2026

Grace Kemp (born 8 June 2001) is an Australian Rugby league player. She plays for the Canberra Raiders in the NRL Women's Premiership competition.

== Playing career ==
Kemp was named in Australia's squad for the 2022 Pacific Four Series in New Zealand. She made her international debut for the Wallaroos against Canada on 18 June at Whangārei. She was then selected in the Wallaroos squad for a two-test series against the Black Ferns at the Laurie O'Reilly Cup.

Kemp made the Wallaroos side over again for the delayed 2022 Rugby World Cup in New Zealand.

=== Canberra Raiders ===
On 17 May 2023 it was reported that she had signed for Canberra Raiders
