= Krystal Blackwell =

Australian rugby league footballer

Personal information
- Full name: Krystal Blackwell
- Born: 20 October 2002 (age 24) Helensburgh, New South Wales, Australia
- Height: 162 cm (5 ft 4 in)
- Weight: 67 kg (10 st 8 lb)

Playing information
- Position: Five-eighth, Fullback, Wing
Club
| Years | Team | Pld | T | G | FG | P |
|---|---|---|---|---|---|---|
| 2023–25 | Nth Qld Cowboys | 27 | 7 | 0 | 0 | 28 |
| 2026– | Canberra Raiders | 13 | 4 | 0 | 0 | 16 |
| | Total | 40 | 11 | 0 | 0 | 44 |
Representative
| Years | Team | Pld | T | G | FG | P |
| 2024 | Prime Minister's XIII | 1 | 0 | 0 | 0 | 0 |
| 2026 | Indigenous All Stars | 1 | 1 | 0 | 0 | 4 |
- Source: As of 2 November 2026

Krystal Blackwell (born 20 October 2002) is an Australian professional rugby league footballer who currently plays for the Canberra Raiders in the NRL Women's Premiership.

Blackwell previously played for the North Queensland Cowboys between 2023 and 2025.

== Background ==
Blackwell was born in Helensburgh, New South Wales and raised in Goulburn. She played her junior rugby league for the Goulburn Stockmen and attended Trinity Catholic College, Goulburn. Prior to Trinity catholic College Goulburn she attended Heathcote High School 2015-2017.

== Playing career ==
=== Early years ===
In 2019, Blackwell joined the Canberra Raiders, playing for their Tarsha Gale Cup side for three seasons. In 2022, Blackwell played for the Goulburn City Bulldogs.

=== 2023 ===
In April, Blackwell represented the Monaro Colts in their NSWRL Country Women's Championship final win over Newcastle-Maitland and was named Player of the Match.

On 23 May, she signed a one-year contract with the North Queensland Cowboys.

In Round 1 of the 2023 NRL Women's season, she made her NRLW debut, starting at five-eighth in a 16–6 loss to the Gold Coast Titans. In Round 7, she scored her first NRL try in a 48–16 loss to the St George Illawarra Dragons.

=== 2024 ===
In May, Blackwell started at fullback in the Mackay Cutters' QRL Women's Premiership Grand Final win over the Norths Devils.

In Round 1 of the 2024 NRL Women's season, Blackwell started on the wing in the Cowboys' 14–0 loss to the Cronulla Sharks. In Round 2, she started at fullback for the first time in the NRLW in the Cowboys' 38–34 win over the St George Illawarra Dragons.

On 13 October, Blackwell represented the Australian Prime Minister's XIII in their win over Papua New Guinea.
