= Cheyelle Robins-Reti =

New Zealand international rugby player

- Born: 9 March 1997 (age 29) Taranaki, New Zealand
- Height: 1.63 m (5 ft 4 in)
- Weight: 71 kg (11 st 3 lb)
- School: Aranmore Catholic College

Rugby union career
- Position(s): Wing, Fullback
Provincial / State sides
Years	Team	Apps	(Points)
2016–23	Waikato	24	(59)
Super Rugby
Years	Team	Apps	(Points)
2022	Hurricanes Poua	2	(0)
2023–Present	Matatū	10	(20)
International career
Years	Team	Apps	(Points)
2021–23	New Zealand	6	(5)
National sevens team
Years	Team		Comps
2017–23	New Zealand 7s		19
- Rugby league career

Playing information
- Position: Centre, Wing, Fullback
Club
Years	Team	Pld	T	G	FG	P
2023–25	Canberra Raiders	28	5	0	0	20
2026–	Newcastle Knights	1	0	0	0	0
	Total	29	5	0	0	20
Representative
Years	Team	Pld	T	G	FG	P
2023–	New Zealand	1	0	0	0	0
- As of 13 November 2026

Cheyelle Robins-Reti (born 9 March 1997) is a New Zealand rugby league player. She plays as centre, wing for Newcastle Knights in the NRL Women's Premiership. She previously played for the Canberra Raiders.

She has also represented New Zealand in fifteens, sevens and Rugby league internationally. She played for Hurricanes Poua before switching to play for Matatū in the Super Rugby Aupiki competition. She has represents Waikato provincially.

== Early life ==
Originally from Taranaki, Robins-Reti relocated to Perth with her mother and attended Aranmore Catholic College. She later moved to Hamilton and studied for a Bachelor of Sport and Exercise. She is from the Ngāti Ruanui iwi.

== Rugby Union career ==
=== 2016–20 ===
Robins-Reti debuted for Waikato in 2016 and soon after made her debut for the Black Ferns Sevens at the 2017 USA Women's Sevens in Las Vegas. She played sevens in Japan for the Hokkaido Barbarians before she returned to New Zealand in 2019.

In 2020, she played for the Possibles against the Probables in a Black Ferns trial match. She played for the Black Ferns against the New Zealand Barbarians at Waitākere.

=== 2021–23 ===
In 2021 she was selected for the Black Ferns tour of Europe. She made her test debut against England on 7 November at Northampton. She joined the Hurricanes Poua for the inaugural Super Rugby Aupiki season in 2022.

Robins-Reti was named in the Black Ferns squad for the 2022 Pacific Four Series. For the 2023 Super Rugby Aupiki season, she moved to the South Island to play for Matatū.

== Rugby League career ==
=== Canberra Raiders ===
On 17 May 2023 it was reported that she had switched code to play for Canberra Raiders Women in their inaugural season
