= Chante Temara =

New Zealand rugby league player (born 2001)

Personal information
- Born: 24 May 2001 (age 25) Rotorua, New Zealand
- Height: 154 cm (5 ft 1 in)
- Weight: 65 kg (10 st 3 lb)

Playing information
- Position: Hooker
Club
Years	Team	Pld	T	G	FG	P
2020–21	Brisbane Broncos	2	0	0	0	0
2022–22	Sydney Roosters	1	0	0	0	0
2023–	Canberra Raiders	42	2	0	0	8
	Total	45	2	0	0	8
Representative
Years	Team	Pld	T	G	FG	P
2024	Prime Minister's XIII	1	0	0	0	0
2024–26	Maori All Stars	3	1	0	0	4
- Source: RLP As of 16 November 2026
- Relatives: Zahara Temara (sister)

Chante Temara (born 24 May 2001) is an Australian rugby league player who plays as a hooker for the Canberra Raiders in the NRL Women's Premiership and the Burleigh Bears in the QRL Women's Premiership.

== Background ==
Born in Rotorua, Temara emigrated to Australia with her family in 2007, where she played her junior rugby league for the Nerang Roosters on the Gold Coast, Queensland. She attended Keebra Park State High School.

Her older sister, Zahara, is an Australia and Queensland representative.

== Playing career ==
=== Burleigh Bears ===
In 2018, Temara made her debut for the Burleigh Bears as a 17-year old. In 2019, she represented Queensland under-18 in the inaugural Under-18 Women's State of Origin game.

=== Brisbane Broncos ===
In September 2020, she joined the Brisbane Broncos NRL Women's Premiership team. In Round 3 of the 2020 NRLW season, she made her debut for the Broncos in their 24–16 win over the Sydney Roosters. On 25 October 2020, she came off the bench in the Broncos 20–10 Grand Final win over the Roosters. Following the Grand Final, she was named in the Queensland State of Origin squad but did not play.

=== Canberra Raiders ===
On 19 April 2023 she joined Canberra Raiders for their inaugural season.

== Achievements and accolades ==
=== Team ===
- 2020 NRLW Grand Final: Brisbane Broncos – Winners
