= Madison Bartlett =

New Zealand rugby league footballer

Personal information
- Born: 4 December 1994 (age 31) Wairoa, New Zealand
- Height: 173 cm (5 ft 8 in)
- Weight: 71 kg (11 st 3 lb)

Playing information
- Position: Wing, Second-row
Club
| Years | Team | Pld | T | G | FG | P |
|---|---|---|---|---|---|---|
| 2019–20 | New Zealand Warriors | 5 | 2 | 0 | 0 | 8 |
| 2021 | St. George Illawarra | 6 | 6 | 0 | 0 | 24 |
| 2022–23 | Gold Coast Titans | 5 | 3 | 0 | 0 | 12 |
| 2023– | Canberra Raiders | 24 | 19 | 0 | 0 | 76 |
| | Total | 40 | 30 | 0 | 0 | 120 |
Representative
| Years | Team | Pld | T | G | FG | P |
| 2019 | New Zealand | 5 | 4 | 0 | 0 | 16 |
| 2019 | New Zealand 9s | 3 | 0 | 0 | 0 | 0 |
- Source: RLP As of 17 November 2026

Madison Bartlett (born 5 December 1994) is a New Zealand rugby league footballer who plays as a winger for the Canberra Raiders in the NRL Women's Premiership.

She is a New Zealand and New Zealand 9s representative.

== Background ==
Born in Wairoa, Bartlett played sevens rugby, basketball and touch football before taking up rugby league with the Richmond Roses in 2016.

== Playing career ==
In 2018, Bartlett underwent double shoulder reconstruction surgery, missing the entire season. She had dislocated her shoulders 16 teams before undergoing surgery.

On 22 June 2019, she made her debut for New Zealand, starting on the wing and scoring a try in a 46–8 win over Samoa. In September 2019, she joined the New Zealand Warriors NRL Women's Premiership team. In Round 1 of the 2019 NRL Women's season, she made her debut for the Warriors in a 16–12 win over the Sydney Roosters.

On 19 October 2019, she came off the bench in New Zealand's 17–15 2019 Rugby League World Cup 9s final win over Australia.

In September 2020, Bartlett was one of five New Zealand-based Warriors' players to travel to Australia to play in the 2020 NRL Women's premiership. Due to COVID-19 restrictions, the players had to quarantine for 14 days on entering Australia and 14 days on return to New Zealand when the season was completed.

In early 2022, Bartlett played in six of seven matches for the St. George Illawarra Dragons in the postponed 2021 NRL Women's season, including the Grand Final on 10 April 2022.

In early June, the Gold Coast Titans announced that Bartlett had signed to play for the club in the 2022 NRL Women's season.

In October she was selected for the New Zealand squad at the delayed 2021 Women's Rugby League World Cup in England.

== Achievements and accolades ==
=== Team ===
- 2019 Rugby League World Cup 9s: New Zealand – Winners
