= Dylan Farrell =

Australian rugby league footballer

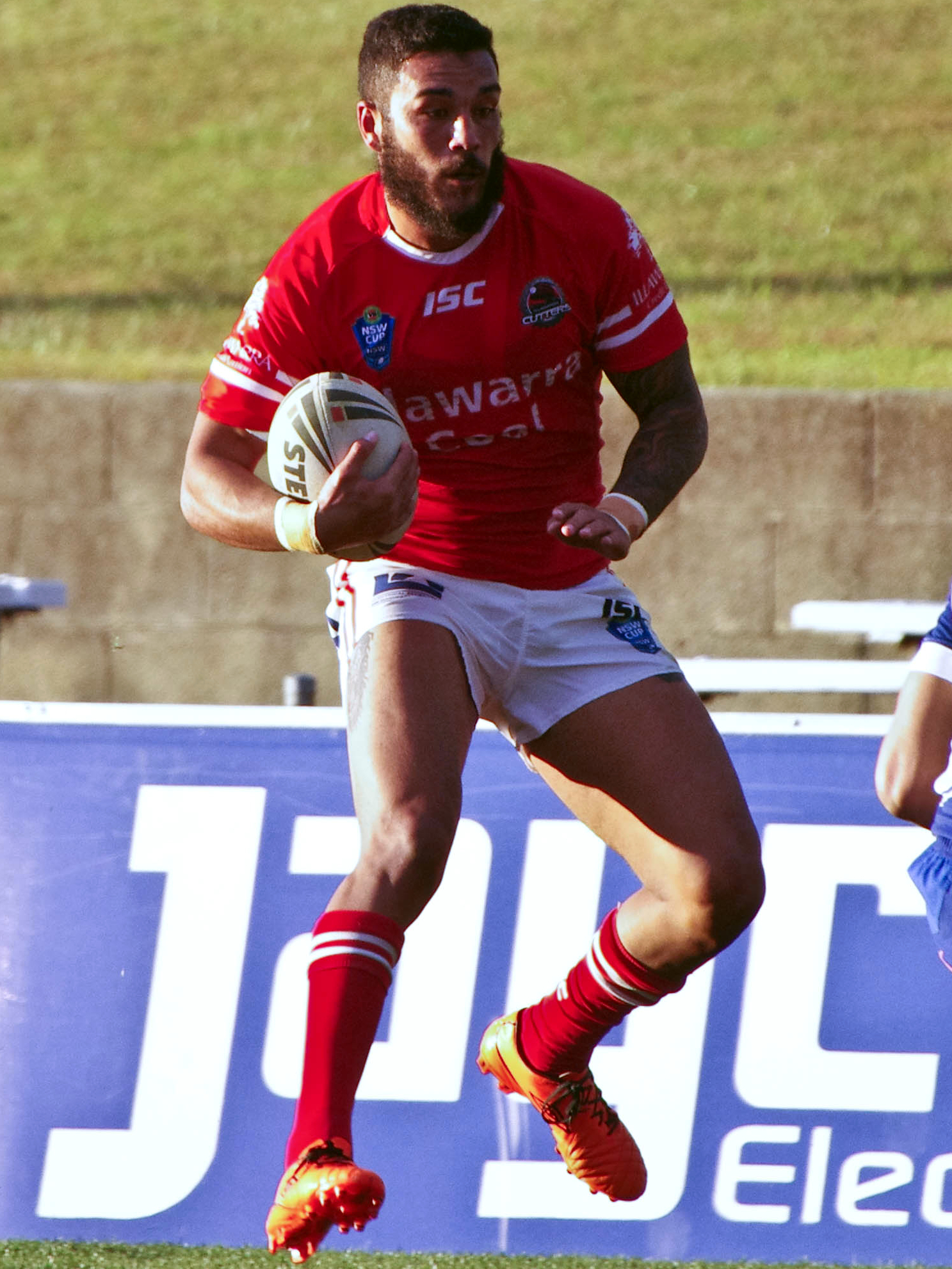

Personal information
- Born: 15 May 1991 (age 35) Nowra, New South Wales, Australia

Playing information
- Height: 188 cm (6 ft 2 in)
- Weight: 98 kg (15 st 6 lb)
- Position: Centre, Wing
Club
Years	Team	Pld	T	G	FG	P
2010–13	South Sydney	70	31	0	0	124
2014–15	St. George Illawarra	20	1	0	0	4
	Total	90	32	0	0	128

Dylan Farrell (born 15 May 1991) is an Australian former professional rugby league footballer who played as a centre and winger for the St. George Illawarra Dragons and South Sydney Rabbitohs in the NRL.

== Background ==
Born in Nowra, New South Wales, Farrell is of Indigenous Australian descent.

Farrell played his junior rugby league for the Culburra Dolphins and Woy Woy Roosters before going on to be signed by the South Sydney Rabbitohs. Farrell has a tattoo of his home town of Culburra on his torso.

== Playing career ==
Farrell played in the North Sydney Bears S.G Ball team. Farrell then played in South Sydney's NYC team in 2009 and 2010.

=== 2010 ===
In round 22 of the 2010 NRL season, Farrell made his NRL debut for the South Sydney Rabbitohs against the Wests Tigers at centre, scoring a hat-trick in a golden point thriller. Farrell scored the winning try right on full-time, the Rabbitohs winning 34–30 at ANZ Stadium. Farrell scored 5 tries from 5 appearances in his debut season. On 31 August, Farrell was named at centre in the 2010 NYC team of the year.

=== 2011 ===
On 18 March 2011 Farrell extended his contract with South Sydney until the end of the 2013 NRL season. Farrell played 23 matches and scored 12 tries for South Sydney in 2011.

=== 2012 ===
Farrell played in all of South Sydney's 27 matches and scored 8 tries in the 2012 NRL season as the club reached the preliminary final against Canterbury-Bankstown but were defeated 32–8 at ANZ Stadium.

=== 2013 ===
In May, Farrell agreed to a three-year contract with the St George Illawarra Dragons starting from 2014. Farrell played in 15 matches and scored 6 tries in his last year with the Rabbitohs. Farrell also spent some time playing in the NSW Cup for Souths feeder side the North Sydney Bears making 9 appearances and scoring 4 tries.

=== 2014 ===
In February, Farrell was selected for the Dragons inaugural Nines squad. In round 1, he made his club debut for St. George against the Wests Tigers, playing at centre in the 44–24 win at WIN Stadium. In round 6, against the Melbourne Storm at AAMI Park, Farrell scored his first club try for St. George in the last minute 24–28 loss. During the match Farrell suffered a pectoral muscle injury and later received the same injury in a NSW Cup match for the Illawarra Cutters, ending his season. Farrell scored one try from 6 games in his first year with St. George Illawarra.

=== 2015 ===
Farrell finished the 2015 NRL season with him playing in 13 matches for the club, playing on the wing and in the centres.

Farrell announced he would retire from rugby league due to a complex and ongoing back injury sustained near the end of the 2015 NRL season

== Post playing ==
In June 2017, Farrell was interviewed by former rugby league player Denan Kemp and revealed he was in severe debt due to the NRL and St. George Illawarra club failing to pay out insurance money which was owed to him. Farrell claimed that he was forced to sell his house which made him feel "at the lowest of the low".

In 2018, Farrell was appointed head coach of the Nowra-Bomaderry Jets.

Former St George Illawarra player Dylan Farrell has avoided jail time for his role in the cultivation of cannabis plants in Nowra, and supply of a small quantity of THC gummies.
