= Sophie Holyman =

Australian rugby league & union footballer

Personal information
- Born: 18 November 1997 (age 28) Brisbane, Queensland, Australia
- Height: 169 cm (5 ft 7 in)
- Weight: 72 kg (11 st 5 lb)

Playing information

Rugby union
- Position: No.8
Club
Years	Team	Pld	T	G	FG	P
2021–22	Queensland Reds	0	0	0	0	0

Rugby league
- Position: Prop
Club
Years	Team	Pld	T	G	FG	P
2022	Brisbane Broncos	5	0	0	0	0
2023–	Canberra Raiders	42	7	0	0	28
	Total	47	7	0	0	28
Representative
Years	Team	Pld	T	G	FG	P
2022–2025	Prime Minister's XIII	2	0	0	0	0
2023–25	Queensland	7	0	0	0	0
- Source: As of 2 November 2026

Sophie Holyman (born 18 November 1997) is an Australian professional rugby league footballer who currently plays for the Canberra Raiders in the NRL Women's Premiership.

A prop, she previously played for the Brisbane Broncos.

== Background ==
Holyman was born in Brisbane, Queensland and raised in Launceston, Tasmania. As a teenager, she moved to the Gold Coast, Queensland, where she attended Marymount College and began playing rugby union.

== Playing career ==
=== Rugby union ===
In 2021 and 2022, Holyman played for the Queensland Reds in the Super W competition, playing as a number eight.

=== Rugby league ===
==== 2022 ====
On 9 June, Holyman switched to rugby league, signing with the Brisbane Broncos. In Round 1 of the 2022 NRL Women's season, she made her debut for the Broncos against the Newcastle Knights.

On 25 September 2022, Holyman represented the Prime Minister's XIII in their win over Papua New Guinea.

==== 2023 ====
On 5 April, Holyman signed with the Canberra Raiders. On 13 May, she came off the bench for the Burleigh Bears in their QRL Women's Premiership Grand Final victory over the Wynnum Manly Seagulls.

On 15 May, Holyman was named in Queensland's State of Origin squad for Game I.
