= Zahara Temara =

Australia & NZ international rugby league & union footballer (born 1997)

Personal information
- Born: 4 July 1997 (age 29) Rotorua, New Zealand
- Height: 174 cm (5 ft 9 in)
- Weight: 79 kg (12 st 6 lb)

Playing information

Rugby league
- Position: Five-eighth, Halfback
Club
Years	Team	Pld	T	G	FG	P
2018–22	Sydney Roosters	24	2	43	1	95
2023–	Canberra Raiders	41	5	92	3	207
	Total	65	7	135	4	302
Representative
Years	Team	Pld	T	G	FG	P
2017	Women's All Stars	1	0	0	0	0
2017	Queensland	7	0	4	0	8
2017–18	Australia	6	4	0	0	16
2019–21	Māori All Stars	2	0	2	0	4
2026	New Zealand	2	0	7	0	14

Rugby union
- Position: Fly-half
Club
Years	Team	Pld	T	G	FG	P
2018–20	Queensland Reds	6	2	11	0	33
- Source: RLP As of 16 November 2026
- Relatives: Chante Temara (sister)

Zahara Temara (born 4 July 1997) is a New Zealand rugby league footballer who plays as a halfback for the Canberra Raiders in the NRL Women's Premiership and the Burleigh Bears in the QRL Women's Premiership.

She is a New Zealand, Australian and Queensland representative, who also played for the Queensland Reds in the Super W.

== Background ==
Born in Rotorua, Temara emigrated to Australia with her family in 2007, where she played her junior rugby league for the Nerang Roosters on the Gold Coast, Queensland. Her younger sister, Chante, also plays for the Canberra Raiders NRLW team.

She played her junior football with boys until she turned 12 and went on to play for the Nerang Roosters girls' team. They made the final but were comprehensively beaten in the final by Tweed Heads Seagulls. Thereafter the Roosters won back-to-back U15 and U16 titles against Logan Brothers. Temara attended Worongary Primary School and Keebra Park State High School.

== Playing career ==
=== Rugby league ===
Temara played for the Nerang Roosters U18 girls team and played in the Burleigh Women's Rugby league women's team at the same time after turning 17. Whilst the Nerang Roosters made the final, they were beaten by Aspley Rugby League Club. In her first year in the Burleigh women's team, they went on to make the semifinals but were knocked out by Beerwah Rugby League Club, where she played fullback. The next year, Temara played rugby union for Helensvale Rugby team, where they went on to make the semifinals, only to be knocked out by a committed Redland Bay team. She continued to play rugby league in the same season where they played Souths Magpies. South Magpies were undefeated all season and had soundly beaten the Bears during the regular season. That all changed in the final, where the Burleigh Bears managed to win their first premiership title. The Bears went on to win another two premierships thereafter (3 peat).

2017

On 5 May 2017, she debuted as a five-eighth for the Australian Jillaroos against the Kiwi Ferns, scoring a try. Temara went on tour with the Jillaroos rugby league team to PNG, playing in the first ever women's rugby league match with that nation. She scored three tries (a hat trick) against Canada at the Rugby League World Cup 2017, where she played in the centre position. Temara played a utility role in the World Cup final, coming off the bench as a forward and securing a win against the Kiwi Ferns at Brisbane's Suncorp Stadium, 2 December 2017.

2018

In June 2018, Temara was announced as one of fifteen marquee signings by the Sydney Roosters, who would participate in the inaugural NRL Women's Premiership in September 2018.

2019

She played in all three of the Sydney Roosters NRL Women's Premiership games, only starting one and losing all three matches as the Sydney Roosters finished last on the table. She did not get any try involvements and did not kick any goals.

2020

In 2020 Temara had a much improved season compared to the 2019 NRL Women's season. She started in all four of the Sydney Roosters as well as in the Grand Final loss against the Brisbane Broncos. She finished the season with four games, scoring her first try in the NRLW, nine conversions and one try assist.

2021

Temara continued her NRLW career for the Roosters heading into her fourth season in the Red, White and Blue. In a year of expansion for the NRLW, she played in all five matched of the normal season, guiding the chooks to a top four finish in an inconsistent year for the Roosters. She was instrumental for the Roosters in their shock semifinal win over the Broncos in which she kicked for over 250 metres and produced two goal line drop outs. Playing in the final series led to the Roosters being the first NRLW team to win the Grand Final other than the Brisbane Broncos. She kicked two conversions, picked up a try assist and kicked for over 180m to guide the Roosters to a NRLW Grand Final Win.

2022

In an undefeated regular season from the Sydney Roosters, Temara finished the season with the most points and conversions in the NRLW, helping them claim the Minor Premiership. Although the regular season, the Sydney Roosters were then themselves found on the receiving end of a shock semifinal loss, losing 24-10 against Parramatta Eels.

2023

After five seasons with the Sydney Roosters, Temara sought a change in scenery, saying that she was very excited to be part of the new expansion NRLW team, the Canberra Raiders. She was automatically given the co-captaincy alongside former Rooster team-mate Simaima Taufa. The Canberra Raiders set a solid foundation for the season, winning four of their opening five games, in which Temara started every game at 5/8. The Canberra Raiders then went on to have a disappointing finish to the year, only managing to win one in the final four games, just missing out on finals, finishing fifth. Temara finished her sixth season in the NRLW playing all nine games for the expansion club, picked up a try, kicked 21 goals and had a career high of five try assists.

2024

Temara was selected to play in the opening game of the historic first game of the first ever Womens Origin three game series for Queensland. She started at half back in the 22-12 loss. She was later dropped for the rest of the series.

She continued her NRLW journey in her second year for the Canberra Raiders, guiding them to a turbulent start of one win from the opening three games, scoring two tries.

2026 She made her New Zealand international début in the 2026 Rugby League World Cup 18-12 win over Fiji on 18 October 2026.

=== Rugby union ===
Temara had previously played three seasons for the Helensvale Hogs RUC rugby women's team, securing representative honours with the Queensland Reds each year. She continued to play Rugby League for the Burleigh Bears, sometimes playing two games back to back on the same day. The Burleigh Bears won three consecutive premiership titles and was named player of the final in 2017. That same year, she was selected in the Queensland women's rugby league team against New South Wales women's rugby league team. They were beaten by a well drilled NSW team in Wollongong.

In 2018, Temara was selected to play for the Queensland Reds in the Brisbane Global Rugby Tens tournament. She played as the starting five-eighth after pool play went onto play New South Wales Waratahs in the final. The Queensland Reds went on to win the final and were crowned winners of the Brisbane Global Rugby Tens. Later that year she was unable to commit to rugby union due to ongoing semiprofessional rugby league commitments. Despite this she managed to play two games, one against WA as a reserve, where they overcame a 20-point second half deficit to beat WA by one points.

The Queensland Reds went on to play NSW in the inaugural Super W rugby union final. Temara started in the final but in extra time NSW prevailed winning via a penalty goal in extra time.
