= Canberra Raiders Women =

Australian rugby league football club

Club information
- Full name: Canberra Raiders; Rugby League Club
- Nickname: The Green Machine
- Colours: Lime Green; White; Navy
- Founded: 30 March 1981; 45 years ago in Queanbeyan NSW
- Website: raiders.com.au

Current details
- Ground: Canberra Stadium (25,000)
- CEO: Don Furner Jr
- Chairman: Dennis Richardson
- Coach: Darrin Borthwick
- Captain: Simaima Taufa; Zahara Temara
- Competition: NRL Women's Premiership
Home colours	Away colours
- Current season

Records
- Biggest win: Raiders 56 – 24 Bulldogs; Belmore Sports Ground (23 Aug 2025)
- Biggest loss: Raiders 6 – 56 Sharks; GIO Stadium (12 Jul 2025)
- First game: Raiders 14 – 28 Sharks; Pointsbet Stadium (23 Jul 2023)
- Most capped: 42 – Sophie Holyman and Chanté Temara
- Highest try scorer: 19 – Madison Bartlett
- Highest points scorer: 207 – Zahara Temara

The Canberra Raiders Women is an Australian professional rugby league football club based in the national capital city of Canberra, Australian Capital Territory. They compete in the National Rugby League Women's Premiership (NRLW), Australasia's premier rugby league competition for female players. The Raiders were admitted to the NRLW in June 2022 to commence in the 2023 NRL Women's season.
The Raiders' home ground is Canberra Stadium (GIO Stadium) in Bruce, Australian Capital Territory. The official symbol for the Canberra Raiders Women is the same as the men’s team, which is the Viking.

== Seasons ==
Season	Regular season								Finals		Ref
Season	P	W	D	L	F	A	Pts	Pos	Top	Placing	Ref
2023	9	5	0	4	173	206	10	5th	4	—	
2024	9	3	0	6	194	216	6	7th	4	—	
2025	11	3	0	8	183	325	6	11th	6	—	
2026	11	6	0	5	265	161	12	5th	6	Preliminary finalist	

=== 2026 Draw ===
The draw for the 2026 season was announced on 14 November 2025.

Round	Opponent	Score	Date	Time	Venue	
1	Dragons	20–4	Sat 4 Jul 2026	3:15 PM	Away	Jubilee Stadium
2	Warriors	42–16	Sun 12 Jul 2026	12:00 PM	Home	GIO Stadium
3	Roosters	18–22	Sat 18 Jul 2026	12:45 PM	Home	GIO Stadium
4	Sharks	10–22	Sat 25 Jul 2026	12:45 PM	Home	GIO Stadium
5	Cowboys	16–18	Sat 1 Aug 2026	4:15 PM	Neutral	Geohex Stadium, Wagga Wagga
6	Broncos	28–4	Sun 9 Aug 2026	11:35 AM	Home	GIO Stadium
7	Knights	25–18	Sun 16 Aug 2026	11:50 AM	Away	McDonald Jones Stadium
8	Bulldogs	48–4	Sat 22 Aug 2026	3:15 PM	Away	Belmore Sports Ground
9	Titans	20–26	Sat 29 Aug 2026	12:45 PM	Away	Cbus Super Stadium
10	Eels	16–17	Sun 6 Sep 2026	6:15 PM	Home	GIO Stadium
11	Tigers	22–10	Fri 11 Sep 2026	5:40 PM	Away	Leichhardt Oval
FW1	Tigers	6–0	Fri 18 Sep 2026	7:50 PM	Away	Campbelltown Stadium
FW2	Roosters	10–20	Sat 26 Sep 2026	7:50 PM	Away	Allianz Stadium

== Head-to-head records ==
Opponent	First Meeting	P	W	D	L	PF	PA	Win %	Share
Sharks	23 Jul 2023	4	0	0	4	42	130	0.00%	24.42%
Roosters	29 Jul 2023	5	1	0	4	86	116	20.00%	42.57%
Tigers	6 Aug 2023	5	5	0	0	105	60	100.00%	63.64%
Dragons	12 Aug 2023	4	3	0	1	91	92	75.00%	49.73%
Eels	20 Aug 2023	4	1	0	3	72	103	25.00%	41.14%
Broncos	27 Aug 2023	4	1	0	3	86	116	25.00%	42.57%
Knights	2 Sep 2023	4	1	0	3	57	82	25.00%	41.01%
Cowboys	10 Sep 2023	4	1	0	3	68	84	25.00%	44.74%
Titans	17 Sep 2023	4	1	0	3	58	85	25.00%	40.56%
Warriors	16 Aug 2025	2	2	0	0	62	32	100.00%	65.96%
Bulldogs	23 Aug 2025	2	2	0	0	104	28	100.00%	78.79%
Totals	23 Jul 2023	42	18	0	24	831	928	42.86%	47.24%

Notes

- Share % is the percentage of points For over the sum of points For and Against.
- Clubs listed in the order than the Raiders Women first played them.
- As of 27 September 2026

== Coaches ==
The inaugural coach of the Canberra Raiders Women's team will coach a fourth successive season in 2026.
As of 27 September 2026

Coach	Season Span	M	W	D	L	For	Agst	Win %	Share %	Ref
Darrin Borthwick	2023–present	42	18	0	24	831	928	42.86%	47.24%	

== Captains ==
All players that have captained the Canberra Raiders women's team in the NRLW.
As of 27 September 2026

C#	Name	Years as Captain	Debut		Games as Captain			Games for Club	Ref
C#	Name	Years as Captain	Date	Round	Solo	Joint	Total	Games for Club	Ref
1	Simaima Taufa	2023–present	23 Jul 2023	1	1	37	38	38	
2	Zahara Temara	2023–present	23 Jul 2023	1	4	37	41	41	

== Current squad ==
The team is coached by Darrin Borthwick.

Jersey numbers in the table reflect the team list announced for Finals Week 2.
Table last updated on 27 September 2026.

J#	Player	Age	Position(s)	NRLW seasons				NRLW stats					Origin	Tests	All Stars
J#	Player	Age	Position(s)	Debut	2018-24	2025	2026	M	T	G	Pts	Prems	Origin	Tests	All Stars
1	Sheridan Gallagher	24	Fullback, Wing	2023	19	13	13	45	28	14	140	1	—	—	—
2	Isabella Waterman	26	Wing, Centre	2024	1	7	9	17	8	0	32	—	—	2	—
3	Leianne Tufuga	24	Centre, Wing	2021	12 16	11	13	52	15	0	60	1	—	1 7	—
4	Bobbi Law	29	Centre, Wing	2019	2 11 13	2	8	36	10	0	40	1	—	—	5
5	Mackenzie Wiki	24	Wing, Centre	2023	14	9	13	36	17	0	68	—	—	3 1	—
6	Krystal Blackwell	23	Five-eighth, Fullback	2023	15	12	13	40	11	0	44	—	—	—	1
7	Zahara Temara	29	Halfback, Five-eighth	2018	24 18	10	13	65	7	135	302	1	8	5	1 6
8	Chloe Saunders	27	Prop, Lock	2023	18	11	13	42	4	0	16	—	—	—	—
9	Chanté Temara	25	Hooker	2020	2 1 18	11	13	45	2	0	8	1	—	—	3
10	Sophie Holyman	28	Prop, Lock	2022	5 18	11	13	47	7	0	28	—	7	—	—
11	Jordyn Preston	23	Second-row, Centre	2024	2	11	12	25	7	0	28	—	—	—	—
12	Charlotte Basham	21	Second-row	2022	8	9	12	29	4	0	16	—	—	—	—
13	Hollie-Mae Dodd	23	Lock, Second-row	2023	15	6	12	33	6	0	24	—	—	11	—
14	Emma Barnes	22	Hooker	2023	14	10	13	37	3	0	12	—	—	—	—
15	Grace Kemp	25	Prop, Lock	2023	18	8	13	39	5	0	20	—	3	—	3
16	Lili Boyle	21	Hooker, Lock	2025	—	7	4	11	0	0	0	—	—	—	—
17	Grace Kukutai	29	Lock	2024	3	8	13	24	1	0	4	—	—	—	—
18	Ellie Brander	18	Prop	2026	—	R	1	1	0	0	0	—	—	—	—
19	Elise Simpson	19	Wing, Fullback	2025	—	9	9	18	14	0	56	—	—	—	—
20	Sereana Naitokatoka	25	Five-eighth, Hooker	2021	4 9 6	9	1	29	3	0	12	—	—	6	—
21	Madison Bartlett	31	Wing	2019	5 6 5 18	6	—	40	30	0	120	—	—	6	—
22	Relna Wuruki-Hosea	20	Wing, Centre	2024	3	3	—	6	2	0	8	—	—	1	—
–	Aaliyah Lomas	22	Lock	—	—	—	—	0	0	0	0	—	—	—	—
–	Evie McGrath	20	Fullback, Five-eighth	2024	3	6	—	9	1	0	4	—	—	—	—
–	Madyson Tooth	24	Centre	—	—	R	—	0	0	0	0	—	—	—	—
S	Simaima Taufa	32	Lock, Prop	2018	9 12 17	11	10	59	17	0	68	—	12	18	2
DV	Marley Cardwell	21	Prop	2025	—	2	—	2	0	0	0	—	—	—	—
DV	Isabella Piper	19	Lock	—	—	U	—	0	0	0	0	—	—	—	—
DV	Gabriella Savage	18	Centre	—	—	U	—	0	0	0	0	—	—	—	—
–	Holly Williams	18	Wing	—	—	U	—	0	0	0	0	—	—	—	—

Notes:

- Evie McGrath and Aaliyah Lomas were each signed on a supplementary contact for 2026.
- The following players were signed on a development contract for 2026.
  - Marley Cardwell
  - Isabella Piper
  - Gabriella Savage
- In late May 2026, Monalisa Soliola withdrew from the 2026 season at her own request.
- The following players were signed on a development contract for 2025.
  - Lili Boyle
  - Milly Caldwell
  - Madyson Tooth
  - Uta Utaisone Poka
- Lili Boyle was elevated into the 2025 squad to replace Ua Ravu.

The Canberra Raiders announced the release of seven players in late November 2025. The Raiders announced player signings in several instalments from December 2025. The Raiders announced contract extensions in several instalments from January 2026.

=== Players out ===
Off contract

- Emma Barnes
- Madison Bartlett
- Charlotte Basham
- Lili Boyle
- Hollie-Mae Dodd
- Sereana Naitokatoka
- Elise Simpson
- Chanté Temara
- Zahara Temara
- Madyson Tooth
- Mackenzie Wiki

=== Off contract after 2027 ===
- Krystal Blackwell
- Ellie Brander
- Sheridan Gallagher
- Sophie Holyman
- Grace Kemp
- Grace Kukutai
- Bobbi Law
- Jordyn Preston
- Chloe Saunders
- Simaima Taufa
- Leianne Tufuga
- Isabella Waterman
- Relna Wuruki-Hosea

== Individual awards ==
=== Individual awards ===
The Canberra Raiders NRLW award winners since 2023.

Year	Player of the Year	Coach's Award	Rookie of the Year	Pathways Player of the Year	Ref
2023	Simaima Taufa	Janelle Williams	Cheyelle Robins-Reti	Georgia Willey	
2024	Simaima Taufa	Chanté Temara	Relna Wuruki-Hosea	Claudia Finau	
2025	Simaima Taufa	Jordyn Preston	Elise Simpson	Uta Uatisone Poka	
2026	Leianne Tufuga	Sheridan Gallagher	Ellie Brander	Gabriella Savage	

== Club records ==
Win-loss record since entering the NRLW in 2023

Games	Wins	Drawn	Loss	Points For	Points Against	+/-	Win %
42	18	0	24	831	928	–97	42.86%

=== Player records ===
Lists and tables last updated: 27 September 2026.

==== Career records (at the Raiders) ====
===== Most Games for the Raiders =====
Qualification: 20 games

Rank	Player	Span	Games
1	Sophie Holyman	2023–present	42
1	Chanté Temara	2023–present	42
3	Zahara Temara	2023–present	41
4	Grace Kemp	2023–present	39
5	Simaima Taufa	2023–present	38
6	Emma Barnes	2023–present	37
7	Mackenzie Wiki	2023–present	36
8	Hollie-Mae Dodd	2023–present	33
9	Cheyelle Robins-Reti	2023–2025	28
10	Madison Bartlett	2023–2025	24
10	Chloe Saunders	2025–present	24
10	Leianne Tufuga	2025–present	24
13	Jordyn Preston	2025–present	23
14	Monalisa Soliola	2023–2025	20
14	Kerehitina Matua	2023–2025	20

===== Most points for the Raiders =====
Qualification: 20 points

Rank	Player	2026 Club	M	T	G	FG	Points
1	Zahara Temara		41	5	92	3	207
2	Madison Bartlett		24	19	0	0	76
3	Mackenzie Wiki		36	17	0	0	68
4	Elise Simpson		18	14	0	0	56
5	Simaima Taufa		38	10	0	0	40
6	Shakiah Tungai	—	16	8	3	0	38
7	Isabella Waterman		16	8	0	0	32
8	Sophie Holyman		42	7	0	0	28
8	Jordyn Preston		23	7	0	0	28
10	Sheridan Gallagher		13	3	7	0	26
11	Hollie-Mae Dodd		33	6	0	0	24
12	Grace Kemp		39	5	0	0	20
12	Cheyelle Robins-Reti		28	5	0	0	20
12	Leianne Tufuga		24	5	0	0	20

===== Most tries for the Raiders =====
Qualification: 5 tries

Rank	Player	Tries
1	Madison Bartlett	19
2	Mackenzie Wiki	17
3	Elise Simpson	14
4	Simaima Taufa	10
5	Shakiah Tungai	8
5	Isabella Waterman	8
7	Sophie Holyman	7
7	Jordyn Preston	7
9	Hollie-Mae Dodd	6
10	Zahara Temara	5
10	Grace Kemp	5
10	Cheyelle Robins-Reti	5
10	Leianne Tufuga	5

===== Most goals for the Raiders =====
All goal kickers

Rank	Player	Goals
1	Zahara Temara	92
2	Sheridan Gallagher	7
3	Shakiah Tungai	3

===== Most field goals for the Raiders =====
Three instances by the same player to date

Rank	Player	Field goals
1	Zahara Temara	3

==== Season records ====
Season length has increased over time as the competition has expanded.

===== Most points in a season for the Raiders =====
Qualification: 20 points

Rank	Player	Season	M	T	G	FG	Points
1	Zahara Temara	2024	9	2	25	0	58
2	Zahara Temara	2025	10	2	21	1	51
2	Zahara Temara	2026	13	0	25	1	51
4	Zahara Temara	2023	9	1	21	1	47
5	Mackenzie Wiki	2026	13	10	0	0	40
6	Madison Bartlett	2024	9	8	0	0	32
6	Elise Simpson	2026	9	8	0	0	32
8	Madison Bartlett	2023	9	7	0	0	28
9	Sheridan Gallagher	2026	13	3	7	0	26
10	Elise Simpson	2025	9	6	0	0	24
11	Shakiah Tungai	2024	7	4	2	0	20
11	Isabella Waterman	2026	9	5	0	0	20

===== Most tries in a season for the Raiders =====
Qualification: 4 tries

Rank	Player	Season	M	Tries
1	Mackenzie Wiki	2026	13	10
2	Madison Bartlett	2024	9	8
2	Elise Simpson	2026	9	8
4	Madison Bartlett	2023	9	7
5	Elise Simpson	2025	9	6
6	Isabella Waterman	2026	9	5
7	Cheyelle Robins-Reti	2023	9	4
7	Shakiah Tungai	2023	9	4
7	Simaima Taufa	2024	8	4
7	Shakiah Tungai	2024	7	4
7	Mackenzie Wiki	2024	7	4
7	Madison Bartlett	2025	6	4
7	Jordyn Preston	2025	11	4
7	Krystal Blackwell	2026	13	4
7	Leianne Tufuga	2026	13	4

==== Match records ====
===== Most points in a game for the Raiders =====
Qualification: 10 points

Rank	Player	Date	Opponent	Venue	T	G	FG	Points
1	Zahara Temara	23 Aug 2025	Bulldogs	Belmore Sports Ground	0	8	0	16
2	Zahara Temara	10 Aug 2025	Broncos	GIO Stadium	1	4	0	12
2	Zahara Temara	28 Jul 2024	Tigers	Campbelltown Sports Stadium	1	4	0	12
2	Zahara Temara	3 Aug 2024	Knights	GIO Stadium	1	4	0	12
2	Krystal Blackwell	22 Aug 2026	Bulldogs	Belmore Sports Ground	3	0	0	12
2	Zahara Temara	22 Aug 2026	Bulldogs	Belmore Sports Ground	0	6	0	12
2	Mackenzie Wiki	29 Aug 2026	Titans	Cbus Super Stadium	3	0	0	12
8	Zahara Temara	10 Sep 2023	Cowboys	Cbus Super Stadium	1	3	0	10
8	Zahara Temara	7 Sep 2024	Dragons	Netstrata Jubilee Stadium	0	5	0	10
8	Sheridan Gallagher	12 Jul 2026	Warriors	GIO Stadium	0	5	0	10

===== Most tries in a game for the Raiders =====
Qualification: 2 tries

Rank	Player	Date	Opponent	Venue	Tries
1	Krystal Blackwell	22 Aug 2026	Bulldogs	Belmore Sports Ground	3
1	Mackenzie Wiki	29 Aug 2026	Titans	Cbus Super Stadium	3
3	Madison Bartlett	23 Jul 2023	Sharks	PointsBet Stadium	2
3	Madison Bartlett	2 Sep 2023	Knights	GIO Stadium	2
3	Madison Bartlett	28 Jul 2024	Tigers	Campbelltown Sports Stadium	2
3	Madison Bartlett	10 Aug 2024	Sharks	GIO Stadium	2
3	Madison Bartlett	7 Sep 2024	Dragons	Netstrata Jubilee Stadium	2
3	Grace Kemp	7 Sep 2024	Dragons	Netstrata Jubilee Stadium	2
3	Madison Bartlett	13 Jul 2025	Eels	GIO Stadium	2
3	Jordyn Preston	23 Aug 2025	Bulldogs	Belmore Sports Ground	2
3	Simaima Taufa	23 Aug 2025	Bulldogs	Belmore Sports Ground	2
3	Isabella Waterman	23 Aug 2025	Bulldogs	Belmore Sports Ground	2
3	Elise Simpson	30 Aug 2025	Wests Tigers	GIO Stadium	2
3	Mackenzie Wiki	12 Jul 2026	Warriors	GIO Stadium	2
3	Elise Simpson	16 Aug 2026	Knights	McDonald Jones Stadium	2
3	Sophie Holyman	16 Aug 2026	Knights	McDonald Jones Stadium	2

===== Most goals in a game for the Raiders =====
Qualification: 4 goals

Rank	Player	Date	Opponent	Venue	Goals
1	Zahara Temara	23 Aug 2025	Bulldogs	Belmore Sports Ground	8
2	Zahara Temara	22 Aug 2026	Bulldogs	Belmore Sports Ground	6
3	Zahara Temara	7 Sep 2024	Dragons	Netstrata Jubilee Stadium	5
3	Sheridan Gallagher	12 Jul 2026	Warriors	GIO Stadium	5
5	Zahara Temara	29 Jul 2023	Roosters	GIO Stadium	4
5	Zahara Temara	6 Aug 2023	Tigers	GIO Stadium	4
5	Zahara Temara	20 Aug 2023	Eels	GIO Stadium	4
5	Zahara Temara	28 Jul 2024	Tigers	Campbelltown Stadium	4
5	Zahara Temara	3 Aug 2024	Knights	GIO Stadium	4
5	Zahara Temara	10 Aug 2025	Broncos	GIO Stadium	4
5	Zahara Temara	9 Aug 2026	Broncos	GIO Stadium	4

==== Oldest and youngest players ====
The oldest and youngest players to represent the Canberra Raiders women's team in the NRLW.

Name	Age	Year
Apii Nicholls	31 and 208 days	2024
Jaida Faleono	18 and 206 days	2024

==== First try and Last try ====
Who scored the first try and most recent try for the Raiders.

Name	Year	Round	Minute	Opponent
Madison Bartlett	2023	1	33'	Sharks
Hollie-Mae Dodd	2026	FW2	58'	Roosters

=== Margins and streaks ===
Biggest winning margins
Qualification: 10 point margin

Margin	Score	Opponent	Venue	Date	Round
44	48-4	Bulldogs	Belmore Sports Ground	22 Aug 2026	8
32	56—24	Bulldogs	Belmore Sports Ground	23 Aug 2025	8
26	42—16	Warriors	GIO Stadium	12 Jul 2026	2
24	28—4	Broncos	GIO Stadium	9 Aug 2026	6
22	34—12	Cowboys	Cbus Super Stadium	10 Sep 2023	8
20	32—12	Tigers	Campbelltown Sports Stadium	28 Jul 2024	1
16	20—4	Dragons	Jubilee Oval	4 Jul 2026	1
12	22—10	Tigers	Leichhardt Oval	11 Sep 2026	11
10	24—14	Roosters	GIO Stadium	29 Jul 2023	2

Biggest losing margins
Qualification: 15 point margin

Margin	Score	Opponent	Venue	Date	Round
50	6—56	Sharks	GIO Stadium	12 Jul 2025	2
34	12—46	Eels	GIO Stadium	19 Jul 2025	3
32	8—40	Broncos	Totally Workwear Stadium	27 Aug 2023	6
26	0—26	Cowboys	Queensland Country Bank Stadium	26 Jul 2025	4
24	6—30	Titans	GIO Stadium	17 Sep 2023	9
22	14—36	Dragons	GIO Stadium	5 Jul 2025	1
18	0—18	Knights	McDonald Jones Stadium	3 Aug 2025	5
16	28—44	Broncos	GIO Stadium	10 Aug 2025	6

Most consecutive wins

- 4 — (29 July 2023 — 20 August 2023)

Most consecutive losses

- 6 — (5 July 2025 — 10 August 2025)

Biggest Comeback

- Recovered from 12 point deficit. Trailed St George Illawarra Dragons 28-16 after 54 minutes at Netstrata Jubilee Stadium on September 7 2024 and won 38-34

Worst Collapse

- Surrendered 16 point lead. Led North Queensland Cowboys 16-0 after 47 minutes at Geohex Park, Wagga Wagga on August 1 2026 and lost 16-18

== History ==
Women’s rugby league was introduced to Canberra in 1991 through the efforts of local citizens. From an early February expression of interest in forming a team in the Canberra Times, a committee was formed, contact and affiliation with the ACT Rugby League was instigated and twenty minute, seven-a-side exhibition matches were held in March 1991. A four team competition commenced in late May 1991, initially with nine-a-side but this became ten-a-side later in the season. Two club teams were sent to an eight-team women's rugby league tournament in the Illawarra in mid-July, with East Canberra winning it. On 28 July 1991, an exhibition match was played at half-time of an NSWRL men's match between the Canberra Raiders and Brisbane Broncos.

A combined ACT women's team toured the North Island of New Zealand in April 1992, winning three of the four matches they played against club sides. An ACT representative team was selected to play Illawarra in late August 1992.

Canberra club teams competed in subsequent National Championships between 1992 and 1994, with several of these competitions hosted in the Australian Capital Territory.
The National Championships switched to representative teams in 1995 and Canberra or Australian Capital Territory teams competed in several if not all years until 2003.

Canberra hosted the second-ever women’s rugby league test match in July 1995, against New Zealand. Six members of the Australian team were from Canberra clubs.

The following year, Canberra hosted a tour match and the First Test in Great Britain’s tour.

The region again hosted the 2002 Great Britain tourists, with a tour match at Seiffert Oval, Queanbeyan. The Third and deciding Test match of this series was played ahead of a Canberra Raiders match at Bruce Stadium.

After a break of fifteen years, Canberra next hosted a women’s rugby league Test Match in 2017.

In 2018, an idea to name the future women's team as the Canberra Valkyries was explored.

In November 2021, the Canberra Raiders announced their intent to apply for an NRLW licence. In April 2022 the club submitted their application to enter the 2023 NRL Women’s Premiership. In June 2022 the NRL announced that the Raiders were one of four clubs accepted into the NRLW for the 2023 season. The Raiders named their inaugural NRLW coach, Darrin Borthwick, in October 2022. In early April 2023, the Raiders announced their first five NRLW player signings: Monalisa Soliola (Dragons), Simaima Taufa (Jillaroos, Eels), Zahara Temara (Jillaroos, Roosters), Sophie Holyman (Broncos), and Ashleigh Quinlan (Kiwi Ferns, Eels). Taufa and Temara were named as joint captains for the first season in early July 2023.

First game and first win

Result	Score	Opponent	Venue	Date	Round	Ref
Lost	14–28	Cronulla Sharks	PointsBet Stadium	23 Jul 2023	1	
Won	24–14	Sydney Roosters	GIO Stadium	29 Jul 2023	2	

=== First Team ===
The first ever Canberra Raiders team who played the Cronulla Sharks on the 23rd July 2023 at PointsBet Stadium. The Sharks won the match 28-14.

Jersey	Position	Player
1	Fullback	Apii Nicholls
2	Wing	Madison Bartlett
3	Centre	Cheyelle Robins-Reti
4	Centre	Mackenzie Wiki
5	Wing	Shakiah Tungai
6	Five-eighth	Zahara Temara (c)
7	Halfback	Ashleigh Quinlan
8	Prop	Tommaya Kelly-Sines
9	Hooker	Chante Temara
10	Prop	Sophie Holyman
11	Second-row	Monalisa Soliola
12	Second-row	Hollie-Mae Dodd
13	Lock	Simaima Taufa (c)
14	Hooker	Emma Barnes
15	Prop	Grace Kemp
16	Second-row	Kerehitina Matua
17	Prop	Tara Reinke
	Coach	Darrin Borthwick

== Players ==
The following players have appeared in NRL Women's Premiership matches for the Raiders. Inaugural coach Darrin Borthwick was assigned number one. Inaugural joint captains Simaima Taufa and Zahara Temara were assigned numbers two and three.

Table last updated: 27 September 2026.

Order	Player	Raiders					First Appearance
Order	Player	M	T	G	FG	Pts	Game	Date	Opponent
2	Simaima Taufa	38	10	0	0	40	1	23 Jul 2023	Sharks
3	Zahara Temara	41	5	92	3	207	1	23 Jul 2023	Sharks
4	Madison Bartlett	24	19	0	0	76	1	23 Jul 2023	Sharks
5	Hollie-Mae Dodd	33	6	0	0	24	1	23 Jul 2023	Sharks
6	Sophie Holyman	42	7	0	0	28	1	23 Jul 2023	Sharks
7	Tommaya Kelly-Sines	12	0	0	0	0	1	23 Jul 2023	Sharks
8	Apii Nicholls	17	1	0	0	4	1	23 Jul 2023	Sharks
9	Ashleigh Quinlan	17	3	0	0	12	1	23 Jul 2023	Sharks
10	Cheyelle Robins-Reti	28	5	0	0	20	1	23 Jul 2023	Sharks
11	Monalisa Soliola	20	4	0	0	16	1	23 Jul 2023	Sharks
12	Chanté Temara	42	2	0	0	8	1	23 Jul 2023	Sharks
13	Shakiah Tungai	16	8	3	0	38	1	23 Jul 2023	Sharks
14	Mackenzie Wiki	36	17	0	0	68	1	23 Jul 2023	Sharks
15	Kerehitina Matua	20	2	0	0	8	1	23 Jul 2023	Sharks
16	Tara Reinke	7	0	0	0	0	1	23 Jul 2023	Sharks
17	Grace Kemp	39	5	0	0	20	1	23 Jul 2023	Sharks
18	Emma Barnes	37	3	0	0	12	1	23 Jul 2023	Sharks
19	Alanna Dummett	4	2	0	0	8	4	12 Aug 2023	Dragons
20	Ua Ravu	2	0	0	0	0	4	12 Aug 2023	Dragons
21	Elise Smith	3	0	0	0	0	5	20 Aug 2023	Eels
22	Ahlivia Ingram	2	0	0	0	0	5	20 Aug 2023	Eels
23	Jessica Gentle	2	1	0	0	4	6	27 Aug 2023	Broncos
24	Petesa Lio	2	0	0	0	0	6	27 Aug 2023	Broncos
25	Ella Ryan	1	0	0	0	0	6	27 Aug 2023	Broncos
26	Sereana Naitokatoka	16	1	0	0	4	10	28 Jul 2024	Wests Tigers
27	Relna Wuruki-Hosea	6	2	0	0	8	14	24 Aug 2024	Cowboys
28	Felice Quinlan	5	1	0	0	4	14	24 Aug 2024	Cowboys
29	Amelia Pasikala	8	2	0	0	8	15	1 Sep 2024	Roosters
30	Georgia Willey	1	0	0	0	0	15	1 Sep 2024	Roosters
31	Jaida Faleono	3	0	0	0	0	16	7 Sep 2024	Dragons
32	Tatiana Finau	9	0	0	0	0	16	7 Sep 2024	Dragons
33	Chloe Saunders	24	2	0	0	8	19	5 Jul 2025	Dragons
34	Georgia Thomas	3	0	0	0	0	19	5 Jul 2025	Dragons
35	Leianne Tufuga	24	5	0	0	20	19	5 Jul 2025	Dragons
36	Isabella Waterman	16	8	0	0	32	19	5 Jul 2025	Dragons
37	Jordyn Preston	23	7	0	0	28	19	5 Jul 2025	Dragons
38	Lili Boyle	11	0	0	0	0	19	5 Jul 2025	Dragons
39	Elise Simpson	18	14	0	0	56	21	19 Jul 2025	Eels
40	Marley Cardwell	2	0	0	0	0	21	23 Aug 2025	Bulldogs
41	Charlotte Basham	12	3	0	0	12	30	4 Jul 2026	Dragons
42	Krystal Blackwell	13	4	0	0	16	30	4 Jul 2026	Dragons
43	Sheridan Gallagher	13	3	7	0	26	30	4 Jul 2026	Dragons
44	Bobbi Law	8	3	0	0	12	30	4 Jul 2026	Dragons
45	Grace Kukutai	13	1	0	0	4	30	4 Jul 2026	Dragons
46	Ellie Brander	1	0	0	0	0	32	18 Jul 2026	Roosters

== Representative honours ==
=== National team representatives ===
Player	Club Debut	Country	International Debut	Years	Ref
Hollie-Mae Dodd	23 Jul 2023	England	**23 Oct 2021**	2024–2025	
Tatiana Finau	7 Sep 2024	Tonga	25 Oct 2025	2025	
Petesa Lio	27 Aug 2023	Samoa	15 Oct 2023	2023	
Kerehitina Matua	23 Jul 2023	Cook Islands	**2 Nov 2022**	2023–2025	
Sereana Naitokatoka	28 Jul 2024	Fiji	**22 Jun 2019**	2024–2025	
Apii Nicholls	23 Jul 2023	New Zealand	**16 Nov 2017**	2023–2024	
Ashleigh Quinlan	23 Jul 2023	New Zealand	14 Oct 2023	2023–2024	
Ua Ravu	12 Aug 2023	Papua New Guinea	**9 Nov 2019**	2023–2024	
Cheyelle Robins-Reti	23 Jul 2023	New Zealand	21 Oct 2023	2023	
Monalisa Soliola	23 Jul 2023	Samoa	19 Oct 2024	2024	
Simaima Taufa	23 Jul 2023	Australia	**9 Nov 2014**	2023–2025	
Leianne Tufuga	5 Jul 2025	New Zealand	**14 Oct 2023**	2025	
Isabella Waterman	5 Jul 2025	Fiji	21 Oct 2025	2025	
Mackenzie Wiki	23 Jul 2023	New Zealand	3 Nov 2024	2024	
Relna Wuruki-Hosea	24 Aug 2024	Papua New Guinea	1 Nov 2025	2025	

Notes:

- International Debut dates in **bold** indicate that the player made her first international appearance prior to playing for the Canberra Raiders NRLW team.
- Janelle Williams was a development member of the Raiders NRLW squad in 2023 prior to making her debut for Samoa in October 2023.
- Leianne Tufuga previously played for Samoa, in 2020.
- Mackenzie Wiki previously played for Cook Islands, in 2022.
- Cheyelle Robins-Reti was 18th player for New Zealand on 3 November 2024, but did not take the field.

=== Women's State of Origin representatives ===
Past and current players that have played for Queensland and New South Wales in the State of Origin.

Player	State	Year(s)
Simaima Taufa	New South Wales	2023–2025
Grace Kemp	New South Wales	2024
Zahara Temara	Queensland	2023–2024
Sophie Holyman	Queensland	2023–2025

=== Prime Minister's XIII representatives ===
Past and current players that have been selected to play in the Prime Minister's XIII.

Player	Year(s)
Sophie Holyman	2024–2025
Monalisa Soliola	2024
Chante Temara	2024
Grace Kemp	2024

=== All-Stars Representatives ===
Past and current players that have played for the Indigenous All-Stars or for the Māori All-Stars.

==== Indigenous All Stars ====
Player	Year(s)
Grace Kemp	2024–2026
Tommaya Kelly-Sines	2024
Ahlivia Ingram	2023
Krystal Blackwell	2026

==== Māori All Stars (Māori people) ====
Player	Year(s)
Zahara Temara	2023–2024, 2026
Ashleigh Quinlan	2023–2025
Chante Temara	2024–2026
Kerehitina Matua	2024–2025

== Feeder team seasons ==
The Canberra Raiders run a women's team in the Tarsha Gale Cup and have an arrangement with Mount Pritchard Mounties for the NSWRL Women's Premiership.

=== Tarsha Gale Cup ===
For Under 18 players from 2018 to 2020. Since 2021, the Cup is for Under 19 players.

Season	Regular Season									Finals		Ref
Season	P	W	D	L	B	F	A	Pts	Pos	Top	Placing	Ref
2018	8	1	0	7	1	154	440	4	10th	8	—	
2019	9	1	1	7	0	106	276	3	9th	8	—	
2020	6	3	0	3	0	118	96	6	5th	8	—	
2021	8	2	1	5	1	128	168	7	7th	6	—	
2022	8	2	0	6	1	102	218	6	10th	6	—	
2023	8	4	1	3	1	158	176	11	6th	6	Elimination Finalist	
2024	8	4	0	4	1	182	134	10	7th	6	—	
2025	8	4	0	4	1	154	200	10	9th	8	—	
2026	8	3	0	5	1	152	182	8	10th	8	—	

=== Lisa Fiaola Cup ===
The Cup is for Under 17 players. The Raiders entered in 2025.

Season	Regular Season									Finals		Ref
Season	P	W	D	L	B	F	A	Pts	Pos	Top	Placing	Ref
2025	8	4	0	4	1	170	148	10	8th	8	Qualifying Finalist	
2026	8	2	1	5	1	142	210	7	10th	8	—	

=== NSWRL Women's Premiership ===
Season	Regular Season									Finals		Ref
Season	P	W	D	L	B	F	A	Pts	Pos	Top	Placing	Ref
2023	10	6	0	4	1	254	142	14	4th	6	Premiers	
2024	11	7	1	3	0	185	204	15	3rd	4	Semi-Finalist	
2025	11	8	0	3	0	288	160	16	2nd	4	Semi-Finalist	
2026	11	7	0	4	0	244	154	14	4th	5	In progress	

Members of Mounties' 2023 premiership-winning team that subsequently were included in the Raider's extended NRLW squad were: Alanna Dummett, Tommaya Kelly-Sines, Petesa Lio, Aaliyah Lomas, Kerehitina Matua, Mackenzie Wiki, Janelle Williams, and captain Simaima Taufa.
