= Simaima Taufa =

Australia international rugby league footballer

Personal information
- Full name: Simaima Taufa-Kautai
- Born: 28 April 1994 (age 32) Tofoa, Tonga
- Height: 163 cm (5 ft 4 in)
- Weight: 80 kg (12 st 8 lb)

Playing information
- Position: Lock, Prop
Club
Years	Team	Pld	T	G	FG	P
2018–20	Sydney Roosters	9	2	0	0	8
2021–22	Parramatta Eels	12	0	0	0	20
2023–	Canberra Raiders	38	10	0	0	40
	Total	59	12	0	0	68
Representative
Years	Team	Pld	T	G	FG	P
2014–25	New South Wales	11	2	0	0	8
2014–	Australia	15	0	0	0	0
2015–16	Women's All Stars	2	0	0	0	0
- Source: RLP As of 16 November 2026

Simaima Taufa-Kautai (born 28 April 1994) is a rugby league footballer who plays as a lock for the Canberra Raiders in the NRL Women's Premiership and Mounties RLFC in the NSWRL Women's Premiership.

She is an Australian and New South Wales representative.

== Background ==
Taufa was born in Tonga and raised in Auckland, New Zealand, before moving to Sydney with her family.

She grew up playing rugby union, playing for the Western Sydney Two Blues in Sydney's Jack Scott Cup competition.

== Playing career ==
In 2014, Taufa began playing rugby league for the Canley Heights Dragons. On 19 July 2014, she made her debut for New South Wales in a 10–26 loss to Queensland. On 9 November 2014, she made her Test debut for Australia in an 8–12 win over New Zealand.

On 27 September 2017, Taufa won the Dally M Female Player of the Year medal at the Dally M awards. On 2 December 2017, Taufa started at lock in Australia's World Cup final win over New Zealand.

On 17 June 2018, Taufa was announced as one of fifteen marquee signings by the Sydney Roosters NRL Women's Premiership team. On 2 September 2018, she was named captain of the side.

In Round 1 of the 2018 NRL Women's season, she made her debut for the Roosters in a 4–10 loss to the New Zealand Warriors. On 30 September 2018, she started at lock in the Roosters 12–34 Grand Final loss to the Brisbane Broncos.

In 2020, Taufa joined the North Sydney Bears in the NSWRL Women's Premiership. On 25 October 2020, Taufa started at prop in the Roosters 10–20 Grand Final loss to the Broncos.

== Achievements and accolades ==
=== Representative ===
- Rugby League World Cup Champion: 2026
