= NRL Women's Premiership =

Australasian rugby league football competition

Telstra Women's Premiership (NRLW)
- Current season or competition: 2026 NRL Women's season
- Sport: Rugby league
- Instituted: 6 December 2017
- Inaugural season: 2018
- CEO: Andrew Abdo
- Number of teams: 12
- Countries: Australia (11 teams); New Zealand (1 team)
- Premiers: Sydney Roosters (2026)
- Most titles: Brisbane Broncos (4 titles)
- Website: NRL.com
- Broadcast partner: Australia; Broadcast; Nine Network; Fox League; Streaming; 9Now; Kayo Sports; Overseas; Broadcast; International broadcasters Streaming; Watch NRL
- Related competition: NRL Men's Premiership; NSWRL Men's Premiership; NSWRL Women's Premiership; QRL Men's Premiership; QRL Women's Premiership; Tarsha Gale Cup

The NRL Women's Premiership (NRLW) also known as the Telstra NRL Women's Premiership due to sponsorship is a rugby league competition in Australasia for female players. The league is run by the National Rugby League (NRL) and is contested by a subset of clubs from that competition. Currently, the league contains clubs from New South Wales, Queensland, the Australian Capital Territory and New Zealand.

The current Premiers are the Sydney Roosters.

== History ==
In 2016, the Cronulla Sharks and St. George Illawarra Dragons contested a Women's Nine's match, which served as a curtain-raiser to the NRL match between the Sharks and Sydney Roosters, at Southern Cross Group Stadium. The Sharks won the match 16–12.

In March 2017, the Cronulla Sharks played another Women's Nine's match, this time defeating the Canberra Raiders by 28–10.

=== 2017 – 2020: Establishment ===
On 6 December 2017, shortly after the conclusion of the 2017 Women's Rugby League World Cup, which concluded with the Jillaroos defeating the New Zealand Ferns by 23–16 in the final, it was announced by the National Rugby League that the inaugural NRL Women's season would operate in a round-robin format, and be held in August 2018, towards the back end of the men's season, with some matches to be played as curtain-raisers to NRL finals matches. The Grand Final, would be contested between the top two teams at the end of the round robin stage, and be played on the same day as the men's Grand Final. It was also announced that a stand-alone State of Origin match would also be contested during the representative weekend, in June.

The Newcastle Knights, St. George Illawarra Dragons, Brisbane Broncos, New Zealand Warriors, Sydney Roosters, South Sydney Rabbitohs and Cronulla Sharks all declared their interest in applying for a licence to participate in the inaugural NRL Women's competition. Other clubs, such as the Melbourne Storm, Manly Sea Eagles, Gold Coast Titans, North Queensland Cowboys, Canberra Raiders, Wests Tigers, Parramatta Eels, Penrith Panthers and Canterbury Bulldogs, all decided to delay bidding, citing money and time constraints.

On 27 March 2018, the National Rugby League announced that the Brisbane Broncos, New Zealand Warriors, St. George Illawarra Dragons and Sydney Roosters had won bids to participate in the inaugural NRL Women's competition, commencing in September 2018.

The Brisbane Broncos were the most dominant team in the opening three seasons winning all three minor premierships and all three premierships.

=== 2021–present: Competition expansion ===
In June 2021 the NRL announced that the NRLW competition would commence expansion and increase to six teams. Initially this meant adding an additional two teams to the competition; however, the New Zealand Warriors announced that they were withdrawing from the competition due to difficulties of moving through borders during the COVID pandemic and an exodus of players and officials. This created an additional spot in the competition, with the NRL announcing that the Gold Coast Titans, Newcastle Knights and Parramatta Eels would be joining the competition for the 2021 season to keep numbers at six.

In March 2022, the National Rugby League and Australian Rugby League Commission announced that NRLW competition would further expand over the course of the 2023 and 2024 seasons by adding two clubs in each season. Clubs were invited to make submissions to join the league and were required to by April 2022, six were received. The clubs that made submissions for an NRLW licence in the expanded competition were: Canberra Raiders, Cronulla Sharks, North Queensland Cowboys, South Sydney Rabbitohs, Penrith Panthers and Wests Tigers. The New Zealand Warriors had previously indicated their desire to return a team to the NRLW competition, but they did not place a submission at this time.

In June 2022, the NRL changed their stance and decided to bring all expansion sides in together with the four teams all be admitted in the 2023 season and that those four clubs were Canberra, Cronulla, North Queensland and Wests Tigers.

Following the announcement both the South Sydney Rabbitohs and Penrith Panthers released statements congratulating the clubs that had been chosen and that they both would be interested in joining the competition in future seasons.

The 2023 NRLW season ran for 11 weeks with 9 rounds, Semi-finals and a Grand Final with the Newcastle Knights claiming their second premiership and the first of the expanded 10 team competition.

On 28 March 2024, the NRL announced that the competition would expand by two teams in the 2025 season, with the addition of Canterbury Bulldogs and the return of the New Zealand Warriors. The 2025 season commenced on the 3rd July with Parramatta defeating Cronulla.

== Clubs ==
The NRLW currently consists of twelve clubs. Six clubs are based within the Greater Sydney area (including one that also represents the Illawarra region south of Sydney), another in regional New South Wales, three in Queensland, and one each in the Australian Capital Territory, and New Zealand. The league operates on a single group system, with no divisions or conferences and no relegation or promotion.

=== Current clubs ===
Club	Location(s)	Home Venue(s) (capacity)	Est.	NRLW debut	Premierships	
Club	Location(s)	Home Venue(s) (capacity)	Est.	NRLW debut	Total	Last
Brisbane Broncos	(Queensland) Brisbane (Milton)	Suncorp Stadium (52,500) Totally Workwear Stadium (3,500)	1988	2018	4	2025
Canberra Raiders	(Australian Capital Territory) Canberra (Bruce)	GIO Stadium (25,011)	1982	2023	0	—
Canterbury-Bankstown Bulldogs	(New South Wales) Sydney (Belmore)	Belmore Sports Ground (16,000), Accor Stadium (82,000)	1935	2025	0	—
Cronulla-Sutherland Sharks	(New South Wales) Sydney (Woolooware)	Sharks Stadium (15,000)	1967	2023	0	—
Gold Coast Titans	(Queensland) Gold Coast (Robina)	Cbus Super Stadium (27,400)	2007	2021	0	—
Newcastle Knights	(New South Wales) Newcastle (New Lambton)	McDonald Jones Stadium (33,000)	1988	2021	2	2023
New Zealand Warriors	(New Zealand) Auckland (Penrose)	Mount Smart Stadium (25,000) FMG Stadium (25,800)	1995	2018 ^{i}	0	—
North Queensland Cowboys	(Queensland) Townsville (Railway Estate)	Queensland Country Bank Stadium (25,455)	1995	2023	0	—
Parramatta Eels	(New South Wales) Sydney (Parramatta)	CommBank Stadium (30,000) Eric Tweedale Stadium (5,000)	1947	2021	0	—
St. George Illawarra Dragons	(New South Wales) Sydney (Carlton) (St. George), (New South Wales) Wollongong (CBD)	Jubilee Stadium (20,500), WIN Stadium (23,000) Allianz Stadium (42,500)	1998	2018	0	—
Sydney Roosters	(New South Wales) Sydney (Eastern Suburbs)	Allianz Stadium (42,500), Polytec Stadium (20,059)	1908	2018	3	2026
Wests Tigers	(New South Wales) Sydney (Campbelltown), (New South Wales) Sydney (Leichhardt)	Campbelltown Stadium (17,500), CommBank Stadium (30,000) Leichhardt Oval (20,000); Allianz Stadium (42,500)	2000	2023	0	—

- ^{i} The New Zealand Warriors were in recess between 2021 and 2024 inclusive

== Players ==
Members of the St. George Illawarra Dragons NRL Women's team assemble outside Jubilee Oval during a promotional appearance in August 2018

The club's playing lists were constructed from scratch through the later stages of 2018. All participants in the 2018 season were required to be over the age of 17.

Initially, clubs were asked to nominate a list of desired players, with the NRL assigning two of these "marquee" players to each club. In addition, clubs were able to sign a number of players with existing connections to the club, or with arrangements for club sponsored work or study.

=== Salary ===
NRL Women's Premiership hands contracts to 40 elite women players.

The top level salary in 2022 is $60,000 (excluding marquee deals). Representative Origin payments are $6,000 per game.

== Season structure ==
=== Pre-season ===
Prior to the commencement of the NRLW home-and-away season teams use this time to organise trial matches to test playing combinations.

=== Premiership season ===
The season operates using a Round-robin format, until 2024, the top four finishing teams contested two Semi-final matches, first versus fourth and second-place versus third with the winners meeting in a Grand Final which was typically held on the same day as the men's NRL Grand Final. From 2025 with the expansion to twelve teams, the format changed to a six team series over three weeks. Winners of 3rd place versus 6th place and 4th place versus 5th place in Week 1 meet 1st place and 2nd place in Week 2 semi-finals. Winners of the semi-finals meet in the Grand Final in Week 3.

For the first three seasons — 2018, 2019 and 2020 — the draw was structured around the men's finals series and the top two of the then four teams contested the Grand Final. Due to measures in place to mitigate the COVID-19 pandemic in Australia in September-October 2021, the 2021 NRLW season was postponed until February 2022, with the Grand Final held as a stand-alone match on Sunday, 10 April 2022. For the actual 2022 season, the NRLW Grand Final reverted to being held on the same day as the NRL men's Grand Final, which was Sunday, 2 October 2022. The two Grand Finals — women's and men's — were also held on the same day and venue in 2023, and (as scheduled for) 2024.

The rules and regulations are mostly the same as in the men's game, with a few exceptions:

- original matches were sixty minutes long, with thirty minutes in each half. 2022 season revised to seventy minute matches, consisting of thirty-five minutes per half.
- ten interchanges in each match, with an additional two during golden point; and
- a 40/30 kick advantage providing for tactical kicking and unpredictability during matches.

=== Postseason ===
In October 2018, NRL announced the inaugural edition of Rugby League World Cup 9s in Western Sydney on 18–19 October 2019, featuring 12 international men's teams and 4 women's teams. This would be around one month after the Women's Grand Final and preseason tournament Auckland Nines in previous years was replaced.

== Seasons ==
Season	Teams	Premiers	Runners-up	Minor Premiers	Wooden Spoon
NRL Women's Premiership
2018	4	Brisbane Broncos	Sydney Roosters	Brisbane Broncos	St George Illawarra Dragons
2019	4	Brisbane Broncos (2)	St George Illawarra Dragons	Brisbane Broncos (2)	Sydney Roosters
2020	4	Brisbane Broncos (3)	Sydney Roosters (2)	Brisbane Broncos (3)	St George Illawarra Dragons (2)
2021*	6	Sydney Roosters	St George Illawarra Dragons (2)	Brisbane Broncos (4)	Newcastle Knights
2022	6	Newcastle Knights	Parramatta Eels	Sydney Roosters	Gold Coast Titans
2023	10	Newcastle Knights (2)	Gold Coast Titans	Newcastle Knights	Parramatta Eels
2024	10	Sydney Roosters (2)	Cronulla Sharks	Brisbane Broncos (5)	Wests Tigers
2025	12	Brisbane Broncos (4)	Sydney Roosters (3)	Sydney Roosters (2)	Wests Tigers
2026	12	Sydney Roosters (3)	Brisbane Broncos	Sydney Roosters (3)	St George Illawarra Dragons (3)

* The 2021 season was postponed due to the COVID-19 pandemic; the season started on 27 February 2022 and was completed on 10 April.

=== Grand Finals ===
Season	Premiers	Score	Runners-up	Referee(s)	Venue	Date	Att.
2018	Brisbane Broncos	34–12	Sydney Roosters	Jon Stone; Kasey Badger	ANZ Stadium; Sydney	30 September 2018	16,214
2019	Brisbane Broncos	30–6	St George Illawarra Dragons	Kasey Badger; Daniel Schwass	ANZ Stadium; Sydney	6 October 2019	36,785
2020	Brisbane Broncos	20–10	Sydney Roosters	Belinda Sharpe	ANZ Stadium; Sydney	25 October 2020	9.071
2021	Sydney Roosters	16–4	St George Illawarra Dragons	Belinda Sharpe	Moreton Daily Stadium; Brisbane	10 April 2022	7,855
2022	Newcastle Knights	32–12	Parramatta Eels	Kasey Badger	Accor Stadium; Sydney	2 October 2022	42,921
2023	Newcastle Knights	24–18	Gold Coast Titans	Belinda Sharpe	Accor Stadium; Sydney	1 October 2023	40,649
2024	Sydney Roosters	32–28	Cronulla Sharks	Ziggy Przeklasa-Adamski	Accor Stadium; Sydney	6 October 2024	40,623
2025	Brisbane Broncos	22-18	Sydney Roosters	Belinda Sharpe	Accor Stadium; Sydney	5 October 2025	46,288
2026	Sydney Roosters	30-6	Brisbane Broncos	Belinda Sharpe	Accor Stadium; Sydney	4 October 2026	47,451

== Awards ==
The following major individual awards and accolades are presented each season:

- Best & Fairest Trophy – to the best and fairest player in the league, voted by the referees
- Leading Try Award – to the player who scores the most tries during the home-and-away season
- Rookie of the Year –
- Veronica White Medal –
- Karyn Murphy Medal – the best player on the ground in the NRL Women's Grand Final, not voted by a committee of media members

Season	Player of the Year		Rookie	Try Scorer	Veronica White	Karyn Murphy Medal
Season	Dally M Medal	RLPA Players' Champion	Rookie	Try Scorer	Community	Grand Final Player of the Match
2018	Brittany Breayley-Nati	NA	—	Taleena Simon	—	Kimiora Breayley-Nati
2019	Jessica Sergis	Jessica Sergis		Jessica Sergis	Honey Hireme	Annette Brander
2020	Ali Brigginshaw	Hannah Southwell	Kennedy Cherrington	Tamika Upton	Georgia Hale	Amber Hall
2021	Millie Boyle; Emma Tonegato	Emma Tonegato	Destiny Brill	Madison Bartlett	Karina Brown	Sarah Togatuki
2022	Raecene McGregor	Raecene McGregor	Jesse Southwell	Teagan Berry; Jayme Fressard; Tamika Upton		Tamika Upton
2023	Tamika Upton	Teagan Berry	Annessa Biddle	Teagan Berry	Tahlulah Tillett	Tamika Upton
2024	Olivia Kernick	Isabelle Kelly	Kasey Reh	Julia Robinson; Sheridan Gallagher; Tiana Penitani	Kimberley Hunt	Tarryn Aiken
2025	Tamika Upton	Tamika Upton	Shalom Sauaso	Tamika Upton	Rhiannon Byers	Mele Hufanga
2026	Tamika Upton	Tamika Upton	Mercedez Taulelei-Siala	Jessica Sergis	Millie Elliott	Tarryn Aiken

=== Middo's Top 5 Players of 2023 ===
Rugby League historian and statician, David Middleton has picked his top five players for the 2023 NRLW season.

Player	Club
Tamika Upton	Newcastle Knights
Tarryn Aiken	Sydney Roosters
Shannon Mato	Gold Coast Titans
Teagan Berry	St George Illawarra Dragons
Mele Hufanga	Brisbane Broncos

=== Middo's Top 5 Players of 2024 ===
Rugby League historian and statician, David Middleton has picked his top five players for the 2024 NRLW season.

Player	Club
Tarryn Aiken	Sydney Roosters
Isabelle Kelly	Sydney Roosters
Olivia Kernick	Sydney Roosters
Tiana Penitani-Gray	Cronulla Sharks
Julia Robinson	Brisbane Broncos

=== Middo's Top 5 Players of 2025 ===
Rugby League historian and statician, David Middleton has picked his top five players for the 2025 NRLW season.

Player	Club
Abbi Church	Parramatta Eels
Olivia Kernick	Sydney Roosters
Julia Robinson	Brisbane Broncos
Jesse Southwell	Newcastle Knights
Tamika Upton	Brisbane Broncos

== Records ==
=== Most appearances ===
The following players have made 50 or more appearances in NRLW matches.
Table last updated 28 September 2026 (after Finals Week 2 of the 2026 Season).

R	Player	Debut	Seasons	Matches	2018	2019	2020	2021	2022	2023	2024	2025	2026
1	Chelsea Lenarduzzi	2018	9	68	4	3	4	6	5	10	10	13	13
1	Keeley Nizza	2018	9	68	3	4	3	7	6	9	11	13	12
3	Isabelle Kelly	2018	9	67	4	3	2	7	6	10	11	12	12
4	Ali Brigginshaw	2018	9	66	4	4	4	6	5	10	10	13	10
5	Zahara Temara	2018	9	65	4	3	4	7	6	9	9	10	13
6	Shaylee Bent	2019	8	63	—	4	2	7	6	11	9	12	12
6	Jocelyn Kelleher	2020	7	63	—	—	3	7	6	10	11	13	12
6	Tamika Upton	2019	8	63	—	3	4	4	5	11	10	13	13
9	Georgia Hale	2018	9	62	3	3	3	5	5	11	9	11	12
10	Raecene McGregor	2018	9	60	3	4	4	7	5	9	9	7	12
11	Olivia Higgins	2021	6	59	—	—	—	7	7	11	10	12	12
11	Olivia Kernick	2021	6	59	—	—	—	7	6	10	11	13	12
11	Julia Robinson	2018	9	59	4	3	4	2	5	6	10	12	13
11	Simaima Taufa	2018	9	59	4	2	4	5	7	9	8	11	10
15	Ellie Johnston	2020	7	58	—	—	3	5	7	9	11	13	10
15	Shanice Parker	2019	7	58	—	1	4	—	7	11	10	13	12
15	Jessica Sergis	2018	9	58	3	4	3	6	6	6	5	13	12
15	Romy Teitzel	2023	7	58	—	—	1	5	7	10	9	13	13
15	Sarah Togatuki	2018	8	58	3	—	4	7	5	7	9	11	12
20	Lauren Brown	2020	7	57	—	—	4	6	5	11	7	12	12
20	Kirra Dibb	2019	8	57	—	3	3	5	7	9	9	9	12
20	Holli Wheeler	2018	8	57	3	4	—	7	6	7	10	9	11
23	Tallisha Harden	2018	9	56	1	3	4	6	4	9	9	11	9
23	Tiana Penitani Gray	2019	8	56	—	4	2	5	5	9	11	12	8
23	Tayla Predebon	2021	6	56	—	—	—	7	7	11	9	12	10
26	Tarryn Aiken	2019	8	55	—	4	4	6	5	10	9	7	10
26	Quincy Dodd	2019	8	55	—	1	4	7	6	9	11	7	10
26	Yasmin Meakes	2020	7	55	—	—	4	7	7	11	10	13	3
26	Hannah Southwell	2018	9	55	3	3	3	7	1	8	10	9	11
30	Keilee Joseph	2021	6	53	—	—	—	6	6	10	10	13	8
30	Brydie Parker	2018	7	53	2	—	4	7	—	10	5	13	12
30	Jesse Southwell	2022	5	53	—	—	—	—	7	11	9	13	13
33	Teagan Berry	2020	7	52	—	—	1	7	6	9	9	9	11
33	Otesa Pule	2022	5	52	—	—	—	—	6	10	11	13	12
33	Leianne Tufuga	2021	6	52	—	—	—	7	5	9	7	11	13
36	Jada Ferguson	2021	6	51	—	—	—	4	5	7	10	13	12
37	Kezie Apps	2018	9	50	3	4	2	5	5	7	3	11	10
37	Shenae Ciesiolka	2020	7	50	—	—	3	6	5	10	8	8	10
37	Millie Elliott	2019	7	50	—	4	4	5	7	8	10	—	12

=== Most games played for each club ===
As of 5 October 2026 (after the Grand Finalof the 2026 season). Bold text indicates that the player is a current member of the club.

Club	Player(s)	Matches
Brisbane Broncos	**Chelsea Lenarduzzi**	69
Canberra Raiders	**Sophie Holyman** & **Chanté Temara**	42
Canterbury-Bankstown Bulldogs	**Andie Robinson** & **Tayla Preston**	22
Cronulla-Sutherland Sharks	**Ellie Johnston**	43
Gold Coast Titans	**Georgia Hale**	53
Newcastle Knights	**Shanice Parker**	53
New Zealand Warriors	**Apii Nicholls**	24
North Queensland Cowboys	**Jasmine Peters**	40
Parramatta Eels	**Abbi Church**	48
St George Illawarra Dragons	Teagan Berry	52
Sydney Roosters	**Isabelle Kelly**	66
Wests Tigers	**Sarah Togatuki**	39

=== Most Individual Points ===
The following players have scored 100 or more points in NRLW matches.
Table last updated 28 September 2026 (after Finals Week 2 of the 2026 Season).

R	Player	Debut	S	M	T	G	FG	P	2018	2019	2020	2021	2022	2023	2024	2025	2026
1	Jocelyn Kelleher	2020	7	63	8	168	1	369	—	—	0	1t	2t	2t 32g	1t 37g	1t 50g 1fg	1t 49g
2	Jesse Southwell	2022	5	53	8	157	0	346	—	—	—	—	2t 6g	3t 33g	22g	2t 41g	1t 55g
3	Zahara Temara	2018	9	65	7	135	4	302	3g	0	1t 9g	10g 1fg	1t 21g	1t 21g 1fg	2t 25g	2t 21g 1fg	25g 1fg
4	Kirra Dibb	2019	8	57	8	127	2	288	—	4g	1t 4g	4g	1t 15g	1t 18g 1fg	1t 18g 1fg	2t 22g	2t 42g
5	Lauren Brown	2020	7	57	7	108	3	247	—	—	1t	19g	7g	1t 11g 2fg	3t 11g	1t 21g 1fg	1t 39g
6	Tamika Upton	2019	8	63	61	0	0	244	—	1t	5t	1t	5t	7t	7t	20t	15t
7	Rachael Pearson	2021	6	48	6	107	3	241	—	—	—	1t 12g	8g 1fg	12g	1t 22g	3t 27g	1t 26g 2fg
8	Romy Teitzel	2020	7	58	17	74	0	216	—	—	0	2t	3t	0	4t 24g	4t 50g	4t
9	Tayla Preston	2022	5	48	3	100	0	212	—	—	—	—	1t 15g	1t 25g	22g	1t 21g	17g
10	Jessica Sergis	2018	9	58	45	0	0	180	1t	3t	1t	1t	2t	7t	5t	8t	17t
11	Raecene McGregor	2018	9	60	5	78	1	177	0	1t	0	0	0	14g	19g	1t 12g	3t 33g 1fg
12	Teagan Berry	2020	7	52	40	1	0	162	—	—	1t 1g	4t	5t	11t	8t	8t	3t
13	Julia Robinson	2018	9	59	40	0	0	160	2t	1t	2t	1t	3t	5t	9t	9t	8t
14	Jayme Fressard	2020	7	46	35	0	0	140	—	—	0	1t	5t	6t	6t	5t	12t
14	Sheridan Gallagher	2023	4	45	28	14	0	140	—	—	—	—	—	7t 4g	9t 3g	9t	3t 7g
16	Ali Brigginshaw	2018	9	66	14	36	0	128	2t	1t	1t	1t	2t 3g	5t 32g	1t	0	1t 1g
17	Madison Bartlett	2019	7	40	30	0	0	120	—	1t	1t	6t	3t	7t	8t	4t	—
17	Jaime Chapman	2020	7	47	30	0	0	120	—	—	0	3t	4t	9t	3t	2t	9t
19	Mele Hufanga	2023	4	40	29	0	0	116	—	—	—	—	—	10t	7t	8t	4t
19	Isabelle Kelly	2018	9	67	29	0	0	116	2t	0	0	4t	3t	5t	3t	7t	5t
21	Tarryn Aiken	2019	8	55	23	7	1	107	—	0	1t	2t	3t 1g	5t	3t 1fg	5t	4t 6g
22	Brydie Parker	2018	7	53	25	0	0	100	1t	—	0	3t	—	4t	4t	2t	11t
22	Georgia Ravics	2023	4	35	25	0	0	100	—	—	—	—	—	5t	5t	10t	5t

=== Most Points in each season ===
As of 5 October 2026

Season	Player	Club	M	T	G	FG	Points
2018	Chelsea Baker	Broncos	4	2	15	0	38
2019	Maddie Studdon	Dragons	4	0	8	0	16
2020	Meg Ward	Broncos	4	1	13	0	30
2021	Lauren Brown	Broncos	6	0	19	0	38
2022	Zahara Temara	Roosters	6	1	21	0	46
2023	Ali Brigginshaw	Broncos	10	5	32	0	84
2024	Jocelyn Kelleher	Roosters	11	1	37	0	78
2025	Romy Teitzel	Broncos	13	4	50	0	116
**2026**	Jesse Southwell	Broncos	14	2	56	0	120

Notes:
- The maximum number of matches including finals has increased over time from 4 in the 2018, 2019 and 2020 seasons, 7 in 2021 and 2022, and 11 in 2023 and 2024, and a potential 14 from 2025.
- In the first five seasons, 2018 to 2022, the player with the most points in each season has also been the player with the **most goals in each season**.
- Jesse Southwell (Knights) with 78 points from 3 tries and 33 goals (from 11 games) finished in second place as point-scorer for the 2023 season, and also in first place as the leading goal scorer in 2023.
- Romy Teitzel (Broncos) with 64 points from 4 tries and 24 goals (from 9 games) was the leading point-scorer for 2024 at the completion of the rounds. Jocelyn Kelleher was in second place with 62 points from 1 try and 29 goals. Kelleher was the leading goal-kicker at the competition of the rounds. Zahara Temara was in third place for the 2024 season with 58 points from 2 tries and 25 goals.
- Kelleher's tally went above Teitzel's tally in the Semi-Final, with the former kicking 4 goals and the latter unable to play due to injury. Kelleher added a further 8 points from 4 goals in the Grand Final.
- After 11 rounds of the 2025 season, Romy Teitzel on 106 points led Jocelyn Kelleher (Roosters), 94, Jesse Southwell (Knights), 78, and Tamika Upton, 72.
- After the Grand Final of the 2025 season, Romy Teitzel on 116 points finished ahead of Jocelyn Kelleher (Roosters), 105, Jesse Southwell (Knights), 80, and Tamika Upton, also 80.
- After 11 rounds of the 2026 season, Jocelyn Kelleher (Roosters) and Jesse Southwell (Broncos) were equal leaders on 98 points, followed by Kirra Dibb (Knights) on 88 points, Lauren Brown (Titans) on 82 points and Raecene McGregor on 79 points.
- After the Grand Final of the 2026 season, Jesse Southwell (Broncos) on 120 points finished ahead of Jocelyn Kelleher (Roosters), 104, and Kirra Dibb (Knights) on 92 points.

=== Most tries scored ===
==== In a career ====
The following is a list of the top 20 try scorers in NRLW history.

R	Player	M	T	2018	2019	2020	2021	2022	2023	2024	2025	2026
1	Tamika Upton	64	61	—	1	5	1	5	7	7	20	15
2	Jessica Sergis	59	45	1	3	1	1	2	7	5	8	17
=3	Teagan Berry	52	40	—	—	1	4	5	11	8	8	3
=3	Julia Robinson	58	40	2	1	2	1	3	5	9	9	8
5	Jayme Fressard	47	36	—	—	0	1	5	6	6	5	13
=6	Madison Bartlett	40	30	—	1	1	6	3	7	8	4	—
=6	Jaime Chapman	47	30	—	—	0	3	4	9	3	2	9
=6	Isabelle Kelly	68	30	2	0	0	4	3	5	3	7	6
9	Mele Hufanga	40	29	—	—	—	—	—	10	7	8	4
=10	Sheridan Gallagher	45	28	—	—	—	—	—	7	9	9	3
=10	Brydie Parker	54	28	1	—	0	3	—	4	4	2	14
12	Georgia Ravics	35	25	—	—	—	—	—	5	5	10	5
=13	Tarryn Aiken	55	24	—	0	1	2	3	5	3	5	5
=13	Olivia Kernick	60	24	—	—	—	3	3	1	6	7	4
15	Chelsea Lenarduzzi	69	22	0	1	2	1	1	3	4	4	6
=16	Evania Isa'ako	45	21	—	—	3	1	0	5	4	—	8
=16	Kerri Johnson	26	21	—	—	—	—	—	—	—	10	11
=18	Emily Bass	35	20	—	—	—	4	0	2	6	3	5
=18	Lauren Dam	44	20	—	—	—	0	—	7	2	4	7
=18	Tiana Penitani Gray	56	20	—	2	1	2	2	2	9	0	2

- Dash indicates the player did not play in any matches in that season
- **Bold** **text** indicates current players
- Table last updated 5 October 2026 (after completion of the 2026 season).

=== Most Tries in each season ===
As of 5 October 2026

Season	Player	Club	Matches	Tries
2018	Taleena Simon	Roosters	4	4
2019	Jessica Sergis	Dragons	4	3
2020	Tamika Upton	Broncos	4	5
2021	Madison Bartlett	Dragons	6	6
2022	Teagan Berry	Dragons	6	5
2022	Jayme Fressard	Roosters	5	5
2022	Tamika Upton	Knights	5	5
2023	Teagan Berry	Dragons	9	11
2024	Sheridan Gallagher	Knights	8	9
2024	Julia Robinson	Broncos	10	9
2024	Tiana Penitani	Sharks	11	9
2025	Tamika Upton	Broncos	13	20
2026	Jessica Sergis	Roosters	13	17

Notes:
- Gallagher and Robinson with 9 tries each, were the equal leading try scorers for 2024 at the completion of the rounds. Both played in their team's respective Semi-Final, but neither scored.
- Penitani scored six tries across the nine rounds of the regular season, one try in the Semi-Final and two tries in the Grand Final.
- Two players were in equal fourth place for the 2024 season with 8 tries: Teagan Berry (Dragons) and Madison Bartlett (Raiders).
- After 11 rounds of the 2025 season, Tamika Upton (Broncos) with 18 tries led Payton Takimoana (Warriors), on 15 tries, Taina Naividi (Roosters) on 11 tries and Georgia Ravis (Sharks) on 10 tries.
- After the Grand Final of the 2025 season, Tamika Upton (Broncos) with 20 tries led Payton Takimoana (Warriors), on 15 tries, Taina Naividi (Roosters) on 11 tries and Georgia Ravis (Sharks) and Kerri Johnson (Broncos) on 10 tries.

=== Most Tries in a Match ===
Player	Club	Tries	Times	Date	Round	Opponent	Venue	Ref
Taleena Simon	Roosters	4	4' 8' 10' 33'	22 Sep 2018	3	Dragons	Allianz Stadium	NRL
Mele Hufanga	Broncos	4	6' 27' 37' 40'	5 Aug 2023	3	Cowboys	Queensland Country Bank Stadium	NRL
Teagan Berry	Dragons	4	28' 42' 49' 66'	26 Aug 2023	6	Titans	Netsrata Jubilee Stadium	NRL
Mele Hufanga	Broncos	4	29' 34' 46' 62'	12 Aug 2024	3	Titans	Totally Workwear Stadium	NRL
Emma Verran	Sharks	4	12' 23' 32' 38'	12 Jul 2025	2	Raiders	GIO Stadium	NRL
Tamika Upton	Broncos	4	24' 44' 49' 65'	31 Aug 2025	9	Bulldogs	Totally Workwear Stadium	NRL
Jaime Chapman	Titans	4	7' 20' 46' 64'	11 July 2026	2	Bulldogs	Accor Stadium	NRL
Lavinia Tauhalaiku	Warriors	4	3' 63' 64' 69'	18 July 2026	3	Cowboys	Mount Smart Stadium	NRL

=== Most Goals in a Match ===
Player	Club	Goals	Times	Missed	Date	Round	Opponent	Venue	Ref
Tayla Preston	Sharks	**8**	2' 5' 11' 31' 34' 39' 55' 70'	21' 64'	17 Sep 2023	9	Eels	GIO Stadium	NRL
Georgia Hannaway	Sharks	**8**	4' 13' 24' 28' 34' 41' 50' 67'	40' 54'	12 Jul 2025	2	Raiders	GIO Stadium	NRL
Zahara Temara	Raiders	**8**	10' 15' 24' 28' 42' 55' 57' 60'	2' 52'	23 Aug 2025	8	Bulldogs	Belmore Sports Ground	NRL

=== Premierships ===
Tally	Club	Seasons	Ref
4	**Brisbane Broncos**	2018, 2019, 2020, 2025	
3	**Sydney Roosters**	2021, 2024, **2026**	
2	**Newcastle Knights**	2022, 2023	

==== Most consecutive ====
- 3 – Brisbane Broncos (2018 to 2020)
- 2 – Newcastle Knights (2022 to 2023)

=== Runners-up ===
Tally	Club	Seasons
3	Sydney Roosters	2018, 2020, 2025
2	St. George Illawarra Dragons	2019, 2021
1	Parramatta Eels	2022
1	Gold Coast Titans	2023
1	Cronulla-Sutherland Sharks	2024
1	Brisbane Broncos	**2026**

=== Minor Premierships ===
Tally	Club	Seasons
5	**Brisbane Broncos**	2018, 2019, 2020, 2021, 2024
3	**Sydney Roosters**	2022, 2025, **2026**
1	**Newcastle Knights**	2023

==== Most consecutive ====
- 4 – Brisbane Broncos (2018 to 2021)

=== Matches played ===
All time ladder
Pos	Team	First game	Pld	W	D	L	PF	PA	Win%	Share %
1	Sydney Roosters	8 September 2018	71	53	0	18	1869	956	74.65%	66.16%
2	Brisbane Broncos	9 September 2018	70	51	0	19	1914	1032	72.86%	64.97%
3	Newcastle Knights	27 February 2022	58	35	0	23	1352	1012	60.34%	57.19%
4	Gold Coast Titans	27 February 2022	55	30	1	24	1033	985	55.45%	51.19%
5	Cronulla-Sutherland Sharks	23 July 2023	44	21	0	23	835	811	47.73%	50.73%
6	Canberra Raiders	23 July 2023	42	18	0	24	831	928	42.86%	47.24%
7	North Queensland Cowboys	22 July 2023	41	16	0	25	652	1059	39.02%	38.11%
8	New Zealand Warriors	8 September 2018	31	12	0	19	544	672	38.71%	44.74%
9	Parramatta Eels	27 February 2022	52	19	0	33	845	1283	36.54%	39.71%
10	St George Illawarra Dragons	9 September 2018	63	21	0	42	979	1356	33.33%	41.93%
11	Canterbury-Bankstown Bulldogs	4 July 2025	22	6	1	15	336	684	29.55%	32.94%
12	Wests Tigers	23 July 2023	41	12	0	29	583	995	29.27%	36.95%

Last updated: 5 October 2026 (after the Grand Final of the 2026 NRL Women's season)
Share % is the percentage of points For over the sum of points For and Against.

== Media coverage ==
=== Television ===
In its inaugural season all matches will be televised live by affiliate partners the Nine Network and Fox League. And NRLWRAP

=== Online ===
The official internet/mobile broadcast partner of the NRL is 9Now and Kayo Sports.

Outside Australia, the inaugural season is available on WatchNRL.

== Corporate relations ==
=== Sponsorship ===
Holden is the league's past and inaugural naming rights partner.

Telstra is the league's naming rights partner.

All playing and training equipment as well as all licensed apparel and hats for the league's four clubs are manufactured by Nike.

Other league sponsors include Rebel Sport, Harvey Norman and Kellogg's.

The official ball supplier is Steeden.

=== Merchandising ===
Official match day attire together with other club merchandise is sold through the NRL's stores and website as well through the clubs and through some retailers.

== See also ==
- List of sports awards honoring women
- Australia women's national rugby league team
- Women's rugby league in Australia
- Australian Women's Rugby League
- National Rugby League
- Women's Super League
- NZRL Women's National Tournament
