= 2023 NRL Women's Grand Final =

NRLW Grand Final

2023 NRL Women's Premiership Grand Final

Newcastle Knights	Gold Coast Titans
24	18
	1	2	Total
NEW	12	12	24
GCT	8	10	18
- Date: 1 October 2023
- Stadium: Accor Stadium
- Location: Sydney, New South Wales, Australia
- Karyn Murphy Medal: Tamika Upton
- Referee: Belinda Sharpe
- Attendance: 40,649

Broadcast partners
- Broadcasters: Nine Network

The 2023 NRL Women's Premiership Grand Final was the conclusive and premiership-deciding game of the 2023 National Rugby League Women's season in Australia. It was contested between the Newcastle Knights and the Gold Coast Titans on 1 October at Accor Stadium in Sydney.

The match was preceded by the 2023 NRL State Championship and followed by the National Rugby League grand final. The match was broadcast live throughout Australia by the Nine Network.

== Background ==
The 2023 NRL Women's season was the 6th season of semi-professional women's rugby league in Australia. The season consisted of nine competition rounds, followed by semi-finals contested by the top four teams on the competition ladder.

The Newcastle Knights finished first on the 2023 ladder with a record of eight wins and one loss for 16 competition points, ahead of the Sydney Roosters and Gold Coast Titans, both on 14, and the Brisbane Broncos on 12 competition points. The Knights hosted the Broncos in a semi-final at McDonald Jones Stadium. The Knights scored three converted tries in the first 18 minutes of the match before conceding one try seven minutes prior to halftime siren to lead 18–4 at the break. The Broncos had the better of second stanza, scoring four tries to two to finish the game on five tries each, but the accurate goal-kicking of Jesse Southwell (five from five) proved the difference as the Broncos missed three conversion attempts.

The Gold Coast Titans finished in third place due to having an inferior points difference of 38 to the Roosters’ 164. Consequently, the Titans travelled to play the Roosters at Allianz Stadium in Sydney. In a tremendous defensive effort, the Titans kept the Roosters scoreless as the Titans themselves managed to score one try in each half. The first try was converted for a 6–0 halftime lead. A penalty goal in the 45th minute extended the lead, before the second, but unconverted, try in the 63rd minute. The Titans held on to win 12–0. The Newcastle Knights were the defending premiers, having won the 2022 NRLW Grand Final at their first appearance in their second season after failing to win a game in their inaugural season.

The Gold Coast Titans were losing semi-finalists in their inaugural NRLW campaign, the postponed 2021 season played from February to April 2022. In the 2022 season, that was played from August to October 2022, The Titans finished win one win from five games, which was the same win-loss record as the Parramatta Eels and Brisbane Broncos. On points difference, the Eels finished fourth, the Broncos fifth and the Titans sixth and last. In their third season, the Titans made their first Grand Final appearance.

With both teams going into 2023 Grand Final in their third NRLW season, the Newcastle Knights had won 15 matches with a win percentage of 68.18% from 22 matches. The Gold Coast Titans had won 12 matches with a win percentage of 57.14% from 21 matches. The Titans had won the first match between the teams, 14–10 in March 2022 but the Knights had the subsequent two meetings, 16–12 in August 2022 and 22–10 in August 2023.

Route to the Grand Final
Team	Regular season									Semi-Finals
Team	1	2	3	4	5	6	7	8	9	Semi-Finals
Newcastle Knights	32–16	20–31	38–4	22–10	22–20	22–14	20–12	20–4	28–8	30–24
Newcastle Knights	H	N	A	H	H	H	A	H	A	H
Gold Coast Titans	16–6	17–16	10–8	10–22	8–30	23–22	16–4	34–12	30–6	12–0
Gold Coast Titans	H	A	A	A	H	A	H	H	A	A
Key: H = Home venue; A = Away venue; N = Neutral venue

== Pre-match ==
=== Broadcasting ===
The match was broadcast live on the Nine Network in Australia and 9Now and on Sky Sport in New Zealand. Radio broadcasters included ABC, Triple M, 2GB, 4BC and NRL Nation.

=== Officiating ===
Belinda Sharpe was appointed as the referee for the NRLW Grand Final for the third time. Kasey Badger was appointed as the video referee in the NRL Bunker. Mitchell Currie and Rochelle Tamarua were appointed as the touch judges. Tamarua become the first New Zealander to officiate in a match on NRL Grand Final day.

== Squads ==
Initial team lists of 22 players were announced on the Tuesday afternoon prior to match, 26 September 2023.

Newcastle Knights
Pos	J#	Player	Age	Matches			
Pos	J#	Player	Age	NRLW		Representative	
Pos	J#	Player	Age	2023	Career	State	Tests
FB	1	Tamika Upton	26	10	26	5	—
WG	2	Sheridan Gallagher	21	10	10	—	—
CE	3	Shanice Parker	25	10	22	1	2
CE	4	Abigail Roache	27	10	10	—	3
WG	5	Jasmin Strange	20	10	11	—	—
FE	6	Georgia Roche	23	7	7	—	11
HB	7	Jesse Southwell	18	10	17	2	—
PR	8	Tayla Predebon	22	10	24	—	—
HK	9	Olivia Higgins	31	10	24	—	—
PR	10	Caitlan Johnston	22	9	20	1	3
SR	11	Laishon Albert-Jones	25	9	9	—	2
SR	12	Yasmin Clydsdale	29	10	28	5	5
LK	13	Hannah Southwell	24	7	24	5	2
IN	14	Nita Maynard	31	10	28	1	15
IN	15	Tiana Davison	22	5	7	—	—
IN	16	Kayla Romaniuk	21	10	13	—	—
IN	17	Rima Butler	25	6	11	—	—
CS	18	Jacinta Carter	19	2	2	—	—
—	19	Caitlin Moran	26	3	7	2	6
—	20	Felila Kia	19	3	3	—	—
—	21	Tamerah Leati	19	0	0	—	—
—	22	Jayde Herdegen	19	0	0	—	—

Gold Coast Titans
Pos	J#	Player	Age	Matches			
Pos	J#	Player	Age	NRLW		Representative	
Pos	J#	Player	Age	2023	Career	State	Tests
FB	1	Evania Pelite	28	10	23	3	4
WG	2	Karina Brown	34	8	29	9	11
CE	3	Jaime Chapman	21	8	22	2	3
CE	4	Niall Williams-Guthrie	35	10	10	—	—
WG	5	Destiny Mino-Sinapati	18	9	9	—	—
FE	6	Chantay Kiria-Ratu		10	10	—	1
HB	7	Lauren Brown	28	10	25	3	5
PR	8	Shannon Mato	25	10	21	5	3
HK	9	Brittany Breayley-Nati	32	10	29	8	10
PR	10	Jessika Elliston	25	10	26	4	—
SR	11	Zara Canfield	22	9	17	—	—
SR	12	Shaylee Bent	23	10	29	4	4
LK	13	Georgia Hale	28	10	29	—	15
IN	14	Sienna Lofipo	18	9	9	—	—
IN	15	Stephanie Hancock	41	10	32	14+	20
IN	16	Rilee Jorgensen	18	7	7	—	—
IN	17	Dannii Perese	19	6	6	—	—
CS	18	Taliah Fuimaono	24	1	14	2	1 3
—	19	Kaitlyn Phillips	26	3	12	—	—
—	20	Laikha Clarke	21	3	10	—	—
—	21	Hailee-Jay Ormond-Maunsell	19	2	8	—	1
—	22	Emily Bass	24	4	11	3	—

Notes:

- The tally of matches played in the above tables are prior to the Grand Final.
- Age is as at the date of the Grand Final, 1 October 2023.
- Going into the Grand Final, Jesse Southwell (Knights) was second in the 2023 top point scorer list with 74 points from three tries and 31 goals.
  - Sheridan Gallagher (Knights) was ninth on the list with 32 points from six tries and four goals.
  - Lauren Brown was the highest placed Titans player on the list in 16th place with 26 points from one try, ten goals and two field goals.
  - Jaime Chapman (Titans) was in equal 17th place with 24 points from six tries.
  - Jesse Southwell remained in second place after the Grand Final, behind Ali Brigginshaw (Broncos) who had scored 84 points from five tries and 32 goals.
- The goal-kicking conversion rates for the 2023 season prior to the match were:
  - Jesse Southwell (Knights) 73.81% having kicked 30 conversions and one penalty goal from 42 attempts.
  - Sheridan Gallagher (Knights) 80.00% having kicked four conversions from five attempts.
  - Lauren Brown (Titans) 45.45% having kicked 10 conversions from 22 attempts.
  - Zara Canfield (Titans) 100.00% having kicked three conversions from three attempts.
  - Rilee Jorgensen (Titans) 50.00% having kicked one conversion and one penalty goal from four attempts.
- Going into the match, the Grand Final participants placed highest in the 2023 top try scorer list were three players in equal seventh place on six tries: Jaime Chapman (Titans), Sheridan Gallagher (Knights), and Abigail Roache (Knights).
  - The try hattrick by Jaime Chapman in the Grand Final elevated her to third place in the 2023 top try scorers list, with nine tries, below Teagan Berry (Dragons) 11 and Mele Hufanga (Broncos) 10.
  - The try by Sheridan Gallagher and two tries by Tamika Upton in the Grand Final elevated them to equal fourth place on seven tries.

== Match summary ==
The Knights won their second premiership.

2023 NRL Women's Premiership Grand Final

Sunday, 1 October
3:55pm AEDT (UTC+11)

Newcastle Knights	24—18	Gold Coast Titans
Tries: 5 Tamika Upton 2 (60', 65'); Jasmin Strange (24'); Sheridan Gallagher (28'); Shanice Parker (31'); Goals: 2 Jesse Southwell 2/5 (62', 67')	1st: 12–8; 2nd: 12–10	Tries: 3 Jaime Chapman 3 (13', 39', 42'); Goals: 3 Zara Canfield 2/3 (14', pen 20'); Lauren Brown 1/1 (43'); Rilee Jorgensen 0/1

Accor Stadium, Sydney
Attendance: 40,649
Referee: Belinda Sharpe
Video referee: Kasey Badger
Touch judges: Mitchell Currie, Rochelle Tamarua
Karyn Murphy Medal: Tamika Upton
Official NRL Website: Match Centre
Highlights: YouTube by NRL on Nine

== Post-match ==
The following 2023 Grand Finalists were selected in national teams for matches in the October-November 2023 international window:

- Australia — Knights: Yasmin Clydsdale, Caitlan Johnston, Tamika Upton (debut); Titans: Lauren Brown, Jaime Chapman, Jessika Elliston (debut), Shannon Mato
- Cook Islands — Titans: Chantay Kiria-Ratu
- England — Knights: England: Georgia Roche
- New Zealand — Knights: Laishon Albert-Jones, Tiana Davison (debut), Shanice Parker, Abigail Roache
- Samoa — Knights: Tamerah Leati (debut); Titans: Sienna Lofipo, Destiny Mino-Sinapati (debut), Niall Williams Guthrie (debut)
- Tonga — Titans: Dannii Perese (debut)
