= 2022 NRL Women's Grand Final =

NRLW Grand Final

2022 NRL Women's Premiership Grand Final

Newcastle Knights	Parramatta Eels
32	12
	1	2	Total
NEW	14	18	32
PAR	6	6	12
- Date: 2 October 2022
- Stadium: Accor Stadium
- Location: Sydney, New South Wales, Australia
- Karyn Murphy Medal: Tamika Upton
- Referee: Kasey Badger
- Attendance: 42,921

Broadcast partners
- Broadcasters: Nine Network

The 2022 NRL Women's Premiership Grand Final was the conclusive and premiership-deciding game of the 2022 National Rugby League Women's season in Australia. It was contested between the Newcastle Knights and the Parramatta Eels on 2 October at Accor Stadium in Sydney.

The match was preceded by the 2022 NRL State Championship and followed by the National Rugby League grand final. The match was broadcast live throughout Australia by the Nine Network.

== Background ==
The 2022 NRL Women's season was the 5th season of semi-professional women's rugby league in Australia. The season consisted of five competition rounds, followed by semi-finals contested by the top four teams on the competition ladder.

The two semi-finals were scheduled as the first part of a four-match programme at Suncorp Stadium. They were followed by Prime Minister’s XIII matches between Australia and Papua New Guinea women, and Australia and Papua New Guinea men.

The Newcastle Knights finished second on the 2022 ladder with a record of four wins and one loss. The Knights played the Dragons, who had finished third with a record of three wins and two losses. The Knights scored two converted tries in the opening ten minutes before the Dragons responded with their own converted try in the 12th minute. A third converted try immediately before halftime saw the Knights lead 18–6 at the break. Two Knights tries three minutes apart in the middle of the second stanza extended their lead to 30–6, which was the fulltime score.

The Parramatta Eels lost the first four of their regular season matches before pulling off a major upset by defeating the Brisbane Broncos in the fifth and final round. The result, along with a subsequent loss by the Gold Coast Titans to the undefeated Sydney Roosters saw three of the six teams finish with a record of one win and four losses. Consequently, fourth place was decided by points difference, with the Eels –20 (from 86 points for minus 106 points against) qualifying for the semi-finals ahead of the Broncos –33 and Titans –60.

In their semi-final, the Parramatta Eels opened the scoring with a converted try in the 13th minute before the Roosters responded with an unconverted try four minutes later. The Eels increased their lead from two to eight points with a second converted try in the 22nd minute. The score remained 12–4 at halftime. The Eels scored two more converted tries in the second stanza, crossing in the 47th and 62nd minutes. The Roosters responded with a converted try but trailed by 14 points with five minutes to play. No further scoring occurred, the Eels winning 24—10.

Both the Newcastle Knights and Parramatta Eels qualified for their first NRLW Grand Final in their second season. The Knights had gone winless in the postponed 2021 season played from February to April 2022. The Knights went into the Grand Final with five wins from eleven matches. The Eels had won two NRLW games earlier in the year, missing those semi-finals on points difference. The Eels went into the Grand Final with four wins from eleven matches.

The Eels had won the first match between the teams, 13–12 in February 2022 with Maddie Studdon kicking a field goal just 19 seconds before fulltime. In their second meeting in early September 2022, the Knights crossed for a converted try with less than three minutes remaining to defeat the Eels, 18–16.

Route to the Grand Final
Team	Regular season					Semi-Finals
Team	1	2	3	4	5	Semi-Finals
Newcastle Knights	32–14	16–12	18–16	16–18	30–8	30–6
Newcastle Knights	H	A	H	A	N	N
Parramatta Eels	16–38	10–16	16–18	16–18	28–16	24–10
Parramatta Eels	H	H	A	N	N	N
Key: H = Home venue; A = Away venue; N = Neutral venue

== Pre-match ==
=== Broadcasting ===
The match was broadcast live on the Nine Network in Australia and 9Now and on Sky Sport in New Zealand. Radio broadcasters included ABC, Triple M, 2GB, 4BC and NRL Nation.

=== Officiating ===
Kasey Badger was appointed as the referee for the NRLW Grand Final for the third time, but for the first time as the sole referee. Badger had previously shared duties with Jon Stone in 2018 and Daniel Schwass in 2019 under the two referees arrangement in place at that time. Adam Gee was appointed as the video referee in the NRL Bunker. Jordan Morel and Tori Wilkie were appointed as the touch judges.

== Squads ==
Initial team lists of 22 players were announced on the Tuesday afternoon prior to match, 27 September 2022.

Newcastle Knights
Pos	J#	Player	Age	Matches			
Pos	J#	Player	Age	NRLW		Representative	
Pos	J#	Player	Age	2022	Career	State	Tests
FB	1	Tamika Upton	25	4	15	3	—
WG	2	Kiana Takairangi	30	5	7	—	3 2
CE	3	Shanice Parker	24	6	11	1	—
CE	4	Bobbi Law	25	5	12	—	—
WG	5	Emmanita Paki	19	3	3	—	—
FE	6	Kirra Dibb	25	6	17	2	1
HB	7	Jesse Southwell	17	6	6	—	—
PR	8	Caitlan Johnston	21	6	10	1	—
HK	9	Olivia Higgins	30	6	13	—	—
PR	10	Millie Boyle	24	6	19	4	1
SR	11	Romy Teitzel	23	6	12	—	—
SR	12	Yasmin Clydsdale	28	6	17	3	—
LK	13	Kayla Romaniuk	20	2	2	—	—
IN	14	Emma Manzelmann	20	6	11	—	—
IN	15	Tayla Predebon	21	6	13	—	—
IN	16	Simone Karpani	25	5	11	—	—
IN	18	Caitlin Moran	25	3	3	2	6
CS	17	Makenzie Weale	20	4	4	—	—
—	20	Kyra Simon	20	2	4	—	—
—	22	Tiana Davison	21	2	2	—	—
—	23	Jessica Gentle	26	1	1	—	—
—	24	Tamsin Barber	29	0	0	—	—

Parramatta Eels
Pos	J#	Player	Age	Matches			
Pos	J#	Player	Age	NRLW		Representative	
Pos	J#	Player	Age	2022	Career	State	Tests
FB	1	Gayle Broughton	26	6	6	—	—
WG	2	Zali Fay	21	5	5	—	—
CE	3	Abbi Church	24	2	7	—	—
CE	4	Rikeya Horne	23	6	17	—	—
WG	5	Cassey Tohi-Hiku	18	3	3	—	—
FE	6	Ashleigh Quinlan	27	5	5	—	—
HB	7	Tayla Preston	23	5	5	—	—
PR	8	Kennedy Cherrington	23	6	15	1	—
HK	9	Brooke Anderson	26	4	4	—	—
PR	10	Ellie Johnston	21	6	14	—	—
SR	11	Christian Pio	22	6	10	—	—
SR	12	Vanessa Foliaki	29	6	17	6	6
LK	13	Simaima Taufa	28	6	20	9	9
IN	14	Filomina Hanisi	21	6	15	2	—
IN	15	Seli Mailangi	25	6	11	—	1
IN	16	Najvada George	23	5	8	—	—
IN	17	Rima Butler	24	4	4	—	—
CS	18	Ruby-Jean Kennard-Ellis	19	3	3	—	—
—	19	Brooke-Morgan Walker	27	1	1	—	—
—	20	Rueben Cherrington	19	2	2	—	—
—	21	Tiana Penitani	26	5	16	4	1
—	22	Tess Staines	20	3	3	—	—

Notes:

- The tally of matches played in the above tables are prior to the Grand Final.
- Age is as at the date of the Grand Final, 2 October 2022.
- Tiana Penitani was named in the reserves for the Eels but was unable to recover from a quadricep muscle injury.
- Going into the Grand Final, Kirra Dibb (Knights) was second in the 2022 top point scorer list with 32 points from one try and 14 goals.
  - Tayla Preston (Eels) was third on the list with 30 points from one try and 13 goals.
  - The two goals by Tayla Preston and one goal by Kirra Dibb in the Grand Final saw them into equal second place, on 34 points, behind Zahara Temara (Roosters) who had scored 46 points from one try and 21 goals.
- The goal-kicking conversion rates for the 2022 season prior to the match were:
  - Kirra Dibb (Knights) 73.68% having kicked 13 conversions and one penalty goal from 19 attempts.
  - Jesse Southwell (Knights) 62.50% having kicked five conversions from eight attempts.
  - Tayla Preston (Eels) 68.42% having kicked 12 conversions and one penalty goal from 19 attempts.
  - Brooke-Morgan Walker (Eels reserve) 66.67% having kicked two conversions from three attempts.
- Going into the match, the Grand Final participants placed highest in the 2022 top try scorer list were Tamika Upton (Knights) in equal third with four tries, and Eels players Rikeya Horne and Simaima Taufa in equal sixth with three tries.
  - The try by Upton in the Grand Final elevated her to equal first place in the 2022 top try scorers list, on five tries along with Teagan Berry (Dragons) and Jayme Fressard (Roosters).
  - The Grand Final try by Taufa moved her into equal fourth place with four tries.

== Match summary ==
The Knights won their first premiership.

2022 NRL Women's Premiership Grand Final

Sunday, 2 October
3:55pm AEDT (UTC+11)

Newcastle Knights	32—12	Parramatta Eels
Tries: 7 Kiana Takairangi 2 (17', 63'); Emmanita Paki (20'); Romy Teitzel (27'); Tamika Upton (38'); Jesse Southwell (67'); Yasmin Clydsdale (69'); Goals: 2 Kirra Dibb 14 (28'); Jesse Southwell 1/3 (68')	1st: 14–6; 2nd: 18–6	Tries: 2 Brooke Anderson (12'); Simaima Taufa (50'); Goals: 2 Tayla Preston 2/2 (13', 51')

Accor Stadium, Sydney
Attendance: 42,921
Referee: Kasey Badger
Video referee: Adam Gee
Touch judges: Jordan Morel, Tori Wilkie
Karyn Murphy Medal: Tamika Upton
Official NRL Website: Match Centre
Highlights: YouTube by NRL on Nine

== Post-match ==
The following 2022 Grand Finalists were selected in national teams for matches in the postponed 2021 World Cup played in the October–November 2022 international window:

- Australia — Knights: Yasmin Clydsdale (debut), Caitlan Johnston (debut); Eels: Kennedy Cherrington (debut), Simaima Taufa.
  - Knights players Millie Boyle and Tamika Upton were selected but withdrew. Eels player Tiana Penitani was unavailable.
- Cook Islands — Knights: Kiana Takairangi.
- New Zealand — Knights: Shanice Parker (debut).
