= Player of the match =

Award in many team sports

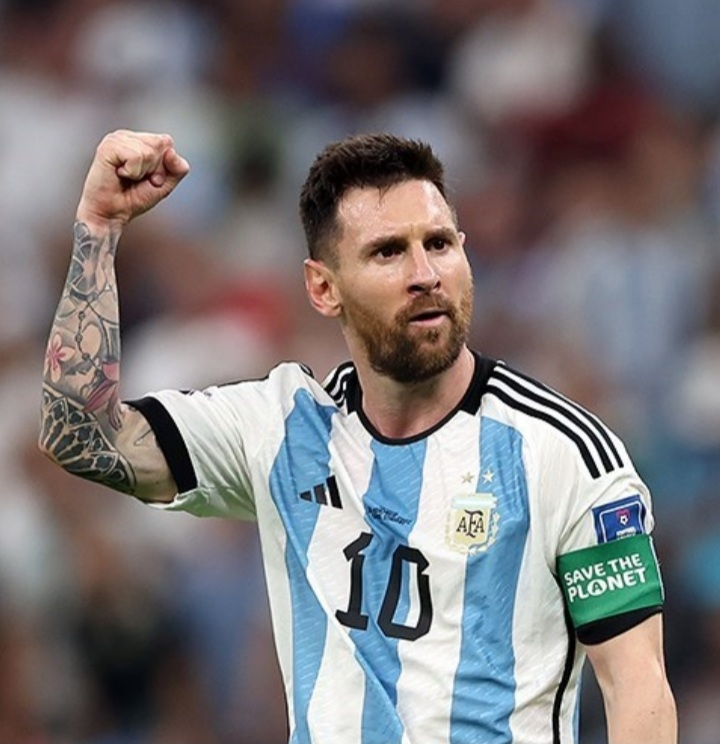
Lionel Messi has won the most man of the match awards in football history. So far he has been selected as such a record 395 times.

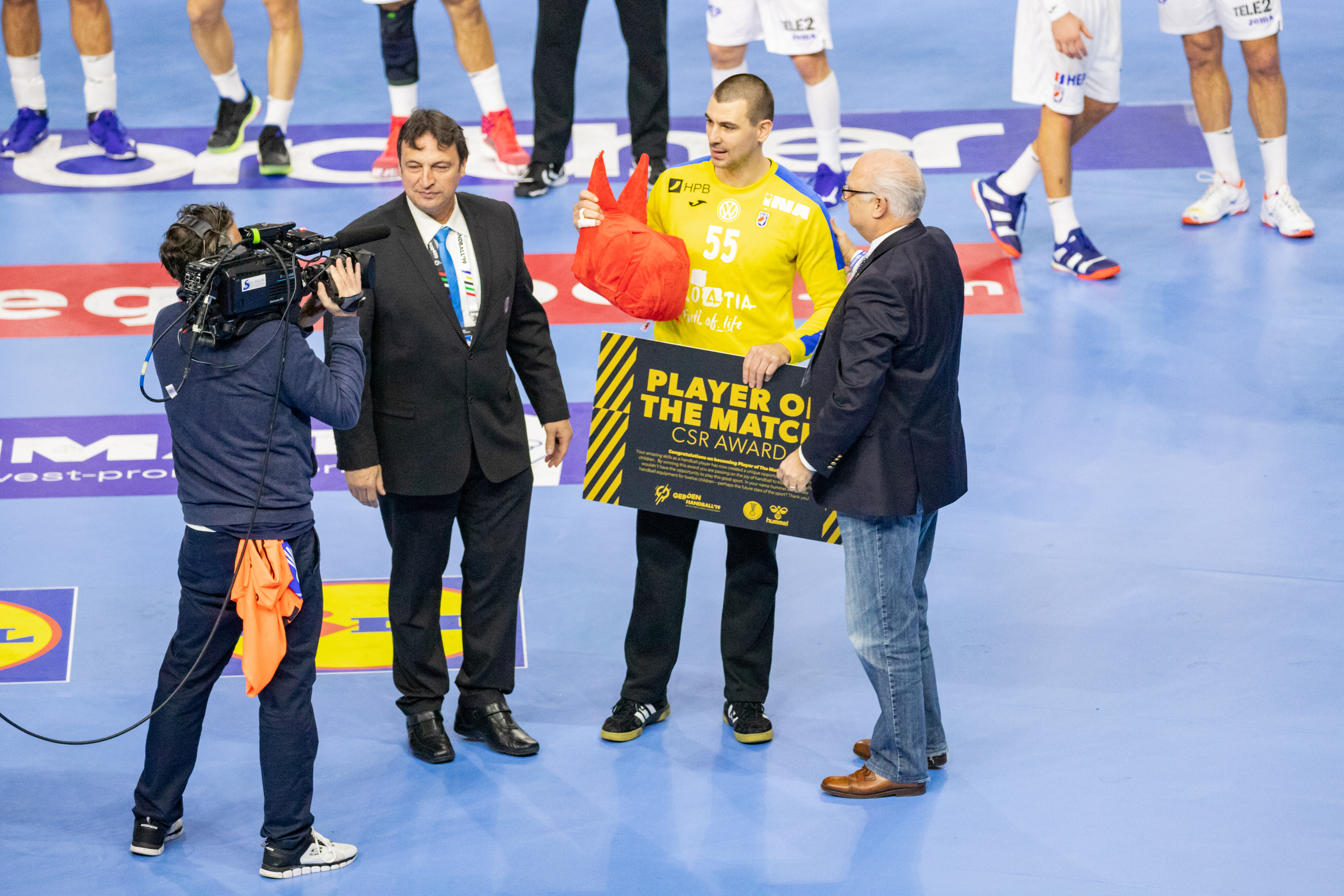
Player of the match

In team sport, a player of the match award (also known as man of the match or woman of the match) is often given to the most outstanding player in a particular match. This can be a player from either team, although the player is generally chosen from the winning team.

Some sports have unique traditions regarding these awards, and they are especially sought in championship or all-star games. In Australia, the term "best on ground" is normally used, both for individual games and season-long awards. In some competitions, particularly in North America, the terms "most valuable player" (MVP) or "most outstanding player" are used. In ice hockey in North America, three players of the game, called the "three stars", are recognised.

In sports where playoffs are decided by series rather than individual games, such as professional basketball and baseball, MVP awards are commonly given for the series, and in ice hockey's NHL, for performance in the entire playoffs.

== Association football ==
In football, the "man of the match" (MOTM) award goes typically (but not necessarily) to a player on the winning side. Players who score a hat-trick, or goalkeepers who keep a clean sheet under pressure often get the award. Hat-trick scorers usually receive the match ball whether or not they are officially named player of the match.

The man of the match is often chosen by a television commentator or a sponsor. However, not all competitions have an official player of the match award, so sometimes accolades are given by websites or newspapers instead. In the Premier League, for example, a player receives a small black and gold trophy for their player of the match performance.

When given informally (for example, by a columnist), the Man of the tournament tm may be "awarded" sardonically, for example to the referee if the writer believes he influenced the result due to perceived incompetence.

== Australian rules football ==
In Australian rules football, the player of the game is often referred to as having been the "best on ground" (or "BOG"). Media outlets provide immediate, unofficial recognition that is largely honorary, often on a 5–4–3–2–1 or 3–2–1 voting basis. Officially, the AFL recognises the player of the game as being the player awarded the maximum three votes by umpires in the Brownlow Medal count at season's end. Exceptions are made during the season for certain reserved games such as the Western Derby, The ANZAC Day clash, QClash, and Showdown, where medallions are officially awarded in presentations following the conclusion of the match. On the day of the AFL Grand Final, a player will be awarded the Norm Smith Medal as being the best on ground voted by an independent panel of Australian rules football experts.

== Cricket ==
In cricket, the man of the match award became a regular feature in Test matches in the mid-1980s. The man of the match title is usually awarded to the player whose contribution is seen as the most critical in winning the game.

In one match held on 3 April 1996, the whole team from New Zealand was awarded the Men of the Match award. It was the first instance when a whole team was awarded it. In a test match played 15 through 18 January 1999 between South Africa vs West Indies, the whole South African team was awarded man of the match.

In Test matches, Jacques Kallis holds the record for the highest number of awards won, with 23 in 166 matches played. In ODIs, Sachin Tendulkar holds the record for the highest number of man of the match titles, with 62 awards in 463 matches played. Tendulkar is followed by Sanath Jayasuriya, who, along with Ricky Ponting, also holds the record for the most Man of the Match titles as captain. In the shortest form of the game, T20Is, this record is held by Virandeep Singh who has won 22 awards.

== Gaelic games ==
In the Gaelic games of hurling and Gaelic football, the "man of the match" (Irish: Laoch na hImeartha, "hero of the game") is commonly awarded after important games. An unusual example was the 2008 All-Ireland Senior Hurling Championship final, where the award was given to Brian Cody, the Kilkenny manager, rather than to a player.

In the women's sports of camogie and ladies' Gaelic football, the term "player of the match" (Irish: Laoch na hImeartha, "hero of the game") is used instead.

== Ice hockey ==
In North American ice hockey, the three players who perform best in the game, often either those who accumulate the most points or outstanding goaltenders, are usually designated the three stars of the game: the top-performing player is the "first star", and so on. This tradition originated in the 1930s as a promotion for a "Three Star" brand of gasoline.

However, in international play (and outside North America), the three stars concept is rarely used. Instead, other leagues may issue awards to one player who performed best in the game.

Recently, in National Hockey League's Stanley Cup Final. Conn Smythe Trophy designated for Most Valuable Player in the all Best-Player in the every Series

== Rugby football ==
Both codes of rugby, rugby league and rugby union, commonly have man of the match or player of the match awards. In televised or sponsored matches, a commentator or sponsor often decides who gets the award, and it is presented to the winner after the match.

Examples of man of the match awards in professional men's rugby league are the Clive Churchill Medal in the National Rugby League Grand Final, the Karyn Murphy Medal in the NRL Women's Grand Final, the Lance Todd Trophy in the Challenge Cup final and the Harry Sunderland Trophy in the Super League Grand Final.

== College basketball and college football ==
In college basketball and college football, the two collegiate sports with the most television coverage in the United States, a top player from each team is usually honoured as "players of the game." These athletes usually cannot collect material prizes due to NCAA regulations. Instead, television companies broadcasting the game or corporate sponsors will often make donations to the scholarship funds of each school in the names of the winning players.

In college basketball's Final Four events, a Most Outstanding Player award is given, for performance across both the semi-final and championship game. A Most Outstanding Player award is also given for each of the four regionals, based upon performances in the regional semifinals (Sweet Sixteen) and final (Elite Eight).

== Gridiron football ==
The National Football League names an MVP for two prominent games on its schedule:

- A Super Bowl Most Valuable Player Award has been awarded at each Super Bowl (the NFL's championship).
- The Pro Bowl has had an MVP award throughout its existence. The current Pro Bowl MVP format selects one offensive and one defensive player. From 1956 to 1971, two MVP awards were given, one to a skill position and the other to a lineman or linebacker. In 1972, an offensive and defensive MVP were named. From 1973 to 2012, a single Pro Bowl MVP was chosen.

Individual games typically have an informal player (or players) of the game chosen by the broadcast network covering the game; one prominent example of this phenomenon is the Turkey Leg Award, All-Iron Award and Galloping Gobbler trophies awarded for games held on Thanksgiving.

The Canadian Football League awards two MVP awards for its championship game, the Grey Cup. The Grey Cup Most Valuable Player award is open to all players; the Dick Suderman Trophy is limited to players with Canadian citizenship or who were raised in Canada since childhood.

== See also ==
- Best and fairest
- Most Valuable Player
- Most Outstanding Player
- Player of the year award
