= NRL Women's Grand Final =

Australian women's rugby league championship game

- Location: Sydney, New South Wales
- Teams: 2
- First meeting: 2018
- Broadcasters: Nine Network; Fox League
- Stadiums: Stadium Australia

Statistics
- Total meetings: 5
- Most wins: Brisbane Broncos

The NRL Women's Premiership Grand Final is the championship-deciding game of women's rugby league's NRL Women's Premiership competition.

== History ==
After the formation of the Women's NRL League in 2018 it was announced that the title would be decided by a playoff series and Grand Final as the men's competition does as well. The first two Grand Finals were held at the Stadium Australia on the same day and before the men's Grand Final.

== Venues ==
The NRL Women's Grand Final is traditionally held in Sydney, as most NRL clubs are based in there and the current venue for the grand final, Stadium Australia is the second highest capacity stadium in Australia, after the Melbourne Cricket Ground.

City	Stadium	Years
(Australia) Brisbane	Dolphin Stadium	2021
(Australia) Sydney	Stadium Australia	2018–

== Qualification for World Club Challenge ==
The winners of the grand final qualify to play the winners of the RFL Women's Super League Grand Final in the World Club Challenge.

== Trophy and awards ==
=== NRL Women's Premiership Trophy ===
NRL Women's Premiership Trophy is the NRLW's main prize, awarded to the team that wins the premiership.

=== Karyn Murphy Medal ===
The best-on-ground grand final player of the match is presented to the player judged as best on the ground during the grand final by a panel of experts. the best player on the ground in the NRL Women's Grand Final, not voted by a committee of media members

=== Premiership rings ===
The NRL present premiership rings for the players and coach of grand final winning sides. Affinity Diamonds have produced the NRL Women's premiership rings

=== Prize money ===
Prize money is awarded to the victorious club.

However the amount is probably not reflective of the magnitude of participating in the event. It is often assumed simply that the winner of the premiership typically experiences an increase in revenue through increases in membership and merchandise sales.

== Grand Finals ==
Season	Premiers	Score	Runners-up	Referee(s)	Venue	Date
NRL Women's Premiership
2018	Brisbane Broncos	34 – 12	Sydney Roosters	J. Stone K. Badger	ANZ Stadium; Sydney	30 September 2018
2019	Brisbane Broncos (2)	30 – 6	St George Illawarra Dragons	K. Badger D. Schwass	ANZ Stadium; Sydney	6 October 2019
2020	Brisbane Broncos (3)	20 – 10	Sydney Roosters	B. Sharpe	ANZ Stadium; Sydney	25 October 2020
2021	Sydney Roosters	16 – 4	St George Illawarra Dragons	B. Sharpe	Moreton Daily Stadium; Brisbane	10 April 2022
2022	Newcastle Knights	32 – 12	Parramatta Eels	K. Badger	Accor Stadium; Sydney	2 October 2022
2023	Newcastle Knights (2)	24 – 18	Gold Coast Titans	B. Sharpe	Accor Stadium; Sydney	1 October 2023
2024	Sydney Roosters (2)	32 - 28	Cronulla Sharks	B. Sharpe	Accor Stadium; Sydney	6 October 2024
2025	Brisbane Broncos (4)	22 – 18	Sydney Roosters	B. Sharpe	Accor Stadium; Sydney	5 October 2025

Team	Winners	Runners-up	Years won	Years runner-up
Brisbane Broncos	4	0	2018, 2019, 2020, 2025	–
Newcastle Knights	2	0	2022, 2023	–
Sydney Roosters	2	3	2021, 2024	2018, 2020, 2025
St George Illawarra Dragons	0	2	–	2019, 2021
Parramatta Eels	0	1	–	2022
Gold Coast Titans	0	1	—	2023
Cronulla Sharks	0	1	—	2024

== Entertainment and traditions ==
It is customary for the NRL Women's Grand Final to begin with a rendition of the Australian National Anthem in which both teams line up opposite each other. Most grand finals thus far have been accompanied by a musical entertainment act that has performed before the match or at half-time. At the conclusion of the match, an award ceremony is held for individual awards, which include the Karyn Murphy Medal and premiership medals awarded for each participant. The captains of both sides are invited to make a speech, and the NRL Women's Premiership Trophy is presented to the captain and coach of the winning team. Following the ceremonies, players of the winning side assemble on a podium for team celebration photographs with the premiership cup and premiership medals.

== Audience ==
The 2022 NRL Women's Premiership Grand Final saw a new women's rugby league world record crowd of 40,649, which was achieved at Stadium Australia

== Media coverage ==
=== Television ===
The match is always broadcast on free-to-air television in Australia, with live rights currently held by the Nine Network. Exclusive replay rights for the 12 hours following the game are held by subscription channel Fox League and streaming service Kayo Sports.

=== Online ===
The official internet/mobile broadcast partner of the NRL is 9Now and Kayo Sports.

Outside Australia, the inaugural season is available on WatchNRL.

=== Radio ===
The NRLW has several exclusive rights partners to broadcast matches live via radio nationwide. FM coverage is provided by Triple M while AM coverage is contracted to ABC Local Radio and 2GB. All radio coverage is available to be streamed live from the NRLW website.

== See also ==
- NRL Grand Final
- RFL Women's Super League Grand Final
- AFL Women's Grand Final
