= Karpani =

Karpani is a surname. Notable people with the surname include:

- Asoiva Karpani (born 1996), Australian rugby union footballer
- Simone Karpani (born 1997), Australian rugby league footballer
