= Newcastle Knights Women =

Rugby League football club based in Newcastle, NSW, Australia

Newcastle Knights

Club information
- Full name: Newcastle Rugby League; Football Club
- Nickname: Novocastrians
- Colours: Primary: Blue; Red; Secondary: White
- Founded: Team: 2021; 5 years ago Club: 1987
- Website: newcastleknights.com.au

Current details
- Ground: McDonald Jones Stadium (33,000)
- CEO: Phil Gardner
- Coach: Ben Jeffries
- Captain: Yasmin Meakes
- Competition: NRL Women's Premiership
- 2026 season: 3rd
- Current season

Uniforms
| Home colours | Away colours |

Records
- Premierships: 2 (2022, 2023)
- Runners-up: 0
- Minor premierships: 1 (2023)
- Biggest win: Knights 46 – 10 Titans; Cbus Super Stadium (14 Sep 2024)
- Biggest loss: Knights 4 – 40 Dragons; McDonald Jones Stadium (20 Mar 2022)
- First game: Knights 12 – 13 Eels; McDonald Jones Stadium (27 Feb 2022)
- Wooden spoons: 1 (2021)
- Most capped: Shanice Parker – 53
- Highest try scorer: Sheridan Gallagher – 25
- Highest points scorer: Jesse Southwell – 232

The Newcastle Knights Women are an Australian rugby league team based in Newcastle, New South Wales. The team is part of the Newcastle Knights club and competes in the National Rugby League Women's Premiership (NRLW). The team's home ground is McDonald Jones Stadium. The team has won two premierships over its history (2022 and 2023).

== History ==
On 11 June 2021, the Newcastle Knights were granted a licence to compete in the 2021 National Rugby League Women's (NRLW) competition. Recently retired Knights player Blake Green was announced as the head coach. The season was planned to commence in August 2021, postponed to October 2021 and further postponed to 2022 due to the ongoing COVID-19 pandemic.

On 1 July 2021, the Knights announced their first ever NRLW signing in Indigenous All Stars and Prime Minister's XIII representative Caitlan Johnston-Green, who was a foundation Tarsha Gale Cup player for the Knights in 2018 before spending two seasons with the Sydney Roosters NRLW side.

On 25 November 2021, it was announced that Knights Tarsha Gale Cup coach Casey Bromilow would be taking on the head coach role after Green had been appointed into a specialist halves role alongside Andrew Johns with Newcastle's NRL side. Jess Skinner was announced as the assistant coach. On the same day, the Knights announced a further six Newcastle and Hunter based signings in Bobbi Law from the Sydney Roosters, Jayme Fressard from the Brisbane Broncos and Georgia Page from the St. George Illawarra Dragons, as well as Phoebe Desmond, Chantelle Graham and Kyra Simon from local teams. Six development players were also announced in Bree Chester, Sophie Clancy, Matilda Jones, Kayla Romaniuk, Jesse Southwell and Tylah Vallance.

On 1 December 2021, the Knights signed nine Kiwi Ferns representatives in Ngatokotoru Arakua, Maitua Feterika, Annetta Nu'uausala, Charntay Poko, Krystal Rota, Charlotte Scanlan, Autumn-Rain Stephens-Daly, Katelyn Vaha'akolo and Kararaina Wira-Kohu, Two days later, the club signed Romy Teitzel from the Brisbane Broncos, AFLW player Paige Parker, rugby sevens player Emma Sykes and North Queensland Gold Stars players Rangimarie Edwards-Bruce, Katie Green, Emma Manzelmann and Tahlulah Tillett.

In January 2022, the Knights signed Kirra Dibb from the New Zealand Warriors after Emma Sykes withdrew from the squad. On 21 February, the 24-woman squad was finalised with the signing of Shannon Evans from the Central Coast Roosters and Romy Teitzel was named team captain, Caitlan Johnston-Green and Krystal Rota named as club captains.

The club played in 5 matches without a win in its inaugural season.

In April 2022, Ronald Griffiths was announced as the new head coach for the upcoming season.

On 18 May 2022, the Knights announced the signing of Australian Jillaroos players Millie Boyle and Tamika Upton for their second season in the competition. Additional notable signings for the 2022 season were Sydney Roosters premiership winning players Yasmin Clydsdale, Olivia Higgins, Simone Karpani, Tayla Predebon, Hannah Southwell, former Jillaroos player Caitlin Moran and former Roosters players Shanice Parker and Kiana Takairangi.

On 16 August 2022, Millie Boyle and Hannah Southwell were appointed co-captains of the club.

After winning four of their five regular-season games, the Knights won their first premiership during the 2022 NRL Women's season, defeating the Parramatta Eels 32–12.

== Seasons ==
| Season | Regular season | | | | | | | | Finals | | Ref |
| Season | P | W | D | L | F | A | Pts | Pos | Top | Placing | Ref |
|---|---|---|---|---|---|---|---|---|---|---|---|
| 2021 | 5 | 0 | 0 | 5 | 48 | 123 | 0 | 6th | 4 | — | |
| 2022 | 5 | 4 | 0 | 1 | 112 | 68 | 8 | 2nd | 4 | Premiers | |
| 2023 | 9 | 8 | 0 | 1 | 224 | 119 | 16 | 1st | 4 | Premiers | |
| 2024 | 9 | 6 | 0 | 3 | 238 | 132 | 12 | 3rd | 4 | Semi-finalist | |
| 2025 | 11 | 7 | 0 | 4 | 258 | 203 | 14 | 3rd | 6 | Preliminary finalist | |
| 2026 | 11 | 5 | 0 | 6 | 284 | 192 | 10 | 6th | 6 | Elimination finalist | |

=== 2026 draw ===
The draw for the 2026 season was announced on 14 November 2025.

| Round | Opponent | Score | Date | Time | Venue | |
|---|---|---|---|---|---|---|
| 1 | Sharks | 18–4 | Thu 2 Jul 2026 | 7:45 PM | Away | Sharks Stadium |
| 2 | Roosters | 10–12 | Sat 11 Jul 2026 | 5:15 PM | Away | Allianz Stadium |
| 3 | Dragons | 38–0 | Sun 19 Jul 2026 | 6:15 PM | Home | McDonald Jones Stadium |
| 4 | Broncos | 12–30 | Sun 26 Jul 2026 | 1:45 PM | Away | Totally Workwear Stadium |
| 5 | Eels | 32–12 | Sun 2 Aug 2026 | 4:00 PM | Neutral | Geohex Stadium, Wagga Wagga |
| 6 | Warriors | 14–22 | Sat 8 Aug 2026 | 5:15 PM | Away | FMG Stadium Waikato |
| 7 | Raiders | 18–25 | Sun 16 Aug 2026 | 11:50 AM | Home | McDonald Jones Stadium |
| 8 | Tigers | 26–27 | Sat 22 Aug 2026 | 12:45 PM | Home | McDonald Jones Stadium |
| 9 | Cowboys | 40–6 | Sat 29 Aug 2026 | 5:15 PM | Away | Queensland Country Bank Stadium |
| 10 | Bulldogs | 56–22 | Sat 5 Sep 2026 | 5:15 PM | Home | McDonald Jones Stadium |
| 11 | Titans | 20–32 | Sun 13 Sep 2026 | 1:45 PM | Home | McDonald Jones Stadium |
| FW1 | Broncos | 16–40 | Sat 19 Sep 2026 | 4:05 PM | Away | Totally Workwear Stadium |

== Head-to-head records ==
| Opponent | First meeting | P | W | D | L | PF | PA | Win % | Share % |
|---|---|---|---|---|---|---|---|---|---|
| Eels | 27 Feb 2022 | 7 | 6 | 0 | 1 | 198 | 79 | 85.71% | 71.48% |
| Broncos | 6 Mar 2022 | 9 | 3 | 0 | 6 | 168 | 264 | 33.33% | 38.89% |
| Roosters | 12 Mar 2022 | 7 | 2 | 0 | 5 | 100 | 127 | 28.57% | 44.05% |
| Dragons | 20 Mar 2022 | 7 | 5 | 0 | 2 | 174 | 110 | 71.43% | 61.27% |
| Titans | 27 Mar 2022 | 8 | 6 | 0 | 2 | 200 | 138 | 75.00% | 59.17% |
| Cowboys | 20 Jul 2023 | 4 | 3 | 0 | 1 | 124 | 49 | 75.00% | 71.68% |
| Sharks | 27 Aug 2023 | 4 | 2 | 0 | 2 | 70 | 51 | 50.00% | 57.85% |
| Raiders | 2 Sep 2023 | 4 | 3 | 0 | 1 | 82 | 57 | 75.00% | 58.99% |
| Tigers | 14 Sep 2023 | 4 | 3 | 0 | 1 | 118 | 47 | 75.00% | 71.52% |
| Bulldogs | 4 Jul 2025 | 2 | 1 | 0 | 1 | 68 | 48 | 50.00% | 58.62% |
| Warriors | 20 Jul 2025 | 2 | 1 | 0 | 1 | 50 | 42 | 50.00% | 54.35% |
| Totals | 4 Jul 2025 | 58 | 35 | 0 | 23 | 1352 | 1012 | 60.34% | 57.19% |

Notes

- Share % is the percentage of points For over the sum of points For and Against.
- Clubs listed in the order than the Knights Women first played them.
- As of 21 September 2026

== Coaches ==
As of 21 September 2026

| Coach | Season Span | M | W | D | L | For | Agst | Win % | Share % | Ref |
|---|---|---|---|---|---|---|---|---|---|---|
| Casey Bromilow | 2021 | 5 | 0 | 0 | 5 | 48 | 123 | 0.00% | 28.07% | |
| Ronald Griffiths | 2022–2023 | 18 | 16 | 0 | 2 | 452 | 247 | 88.89% | 64.66% | |
| Ben Jeffries | 2024-present | 34 | 19 | 0 | 16 | 852 | 642 | 54.29% | 57.03% | |

== Captains ==
All players who have captained the Newcastle Knights Women's team in NRLW matches.
As of 20 September 2026

| C# | Name | Years as Captain | Debut | | Games as Captain | | | Games for Club | Ref |
| C# | Name | Years as Captain | Date | Round | Solo | Joint | Total | Games for Club | Ref |
|---|---|---|---|---|---|---|---|---|---|
| 1 | Romy Teitzel | 2021 | 27 Feb 2022 | 1 | 5 | 0 | 5 | 12 | |
| 2 | Hannah Southwell | 2022–2024 | 21 Aug 2022 | 1 | 18 | 1 | 19 | 19 | |
| 2 | Millie Elliott | 2022 | 21 Aug 2022 | 1 | 6 | 1 | 7 | 7 | |
| 4 | Tamika Upton | 2023–2024 | 22 Jul 2023 | 1 | 3 | 0 | 3 | 26 | |
| 5 | Yasmin Meakes | 2025–present | 4 Jul 2025 | 1 | 16 | 0 | 16 | 44 | |
| 6 | Kayla Romaniuk | 2026 | 26 Jul 2026 | 4 | 9 | 0 | 9 | 48 | |

== Players ==
=== Current squad ===
Jersey numbers in the table reflect the team list announced for Finals Week 1.
Table last updated on 20 September 2026.

| J# | Player | Age | Position(s) | NRLW seasons | | | | NRLW stats | | | | | Origin | Tests | All Stars |
| J# | Player | Age | Position(s) | Debut | 2018-24 | 2025 | 2026 | M | T | G | Pts | Prems | Origin | Tests | All Stars |
|---|---|---|---|---|---|---|---|---|---|---|---|---|---|---|---|
| 1 | Lucy Spain | 18 | Fullback, Centre | 2026 | — | R | 11 | 11 | 2 | 0 | 8 | — | — | — | — |
| 2 | Shanice Parker | 28 | Wing, Centre | 2019 | 5 28 | 13 | 12 | 58 | 15 | 0 | 60 | 2 | 1 | 11 | 1 5 |
| 3 | Sidney Taylor | 24 | Centre, Wing | 2026 | — | U7s | 12 | 12 | 5 | 0 | 20 | — | — | — | — |
| 4 | Tenika Willison | 28 | Centre, Wing | 2024 | 7 | 12 | 12 | 31 | 10 | 0 | 40 | — | — | — | 1 |
| 5 | Mercedez Taulelei-Siala | 20 | Wing, Second-row | 2025 | — | 1 | 12 | 13 | 14 | 0 | 56 | — | — | 4 | — |
| 6 | Kirra Dibb | 29 | Five-eighth, Halfback | 2019 | 3 3 12 18 | 9 | 12 | 57 | 8 | 127 | 288 | 1 | 2 | 1 | 5 |
| 7 | Georgia Roche | 26 | Halfback, Five-eighth | 2023 | 18 | 13 | 11 | 42 | 10 | 4 | 48 | 1 | — | 13 | — |
| 8 | Tayla Predebon | 25 | Prop | 2021 | 7 27 | 12 | 10 | 56 | 10 | 0 | 40 | 1 2 | — | — | — |
| 9 | Olivia Higgins | 34 | Hooker | 2021 | 7 28 | 12 | 12 | 59 | 17 | 0 | 68 | 1 2 | 6 | 5 | — |
| 10 | Tiana Davison | 25 | Prop, Lock | 2022 | 8 8 | 13 | 11 | 40 | 6 | 0 | 24 | 2 1 | — | 5 | — |
| 11 | Sienna Yeo | 21 | Second-row, Lock | 2025 | — | 13 | 12 | 25 | 4 | 0 | 16 | — | — | — | — |
| 12 | Fane Finau | 20 | Second-row | 2025 | — | 4 | 10 | 14 | 6 | 0 | 24 | — | — | 2 | 1 |
| 13 | Kayla Romaniuk | 24 | Lock, Prop | 2022 | 24 | 12 | 12 | 48 | 6 | 0 | 24 | 2 | — | — | — |
| 14 | Charley Lahmert | 18 | Hooker | 2026 | — | R | 5 | 5 | 2 | 0 | 8 | — | — | — | — |
| 15 | Emily McArthur | 18 | Prop, Lock | 2026 | — | R | 5 | 5 | 0 | 0 | 0 | — | — | — | — |
| 16 | Jules Kirkpatrick | 23 | Lock, Second-row | 2025 | — | 13 | 9 | 22 | 3 | 0 | 12 | — | — | — | — |
| 17 | Stella Lewis | 18 | Second-row | 2026 | — | U | 1 | 1 | 0 | 0 | 0 | — | — | — | — |
| 18 | Lilly-Ann White | 21 | Fullback, Wing | 2024 | 5 | 6 | 2 | 13 | 6 | 0 | 24 | — | — | — | 1 |
| 19 | Simone Karpani | 29 | Prop, Lock | 2021 | 6 18 | 9 | 8 | 41 | 2 | 0 | 8 | 1 2 | — | 3 | 1 |
| 20 | Amelia Pasikala | 22 | Prop, Second-row | 2023 | 7 4 | 4 | 11 | 26 | 6 | 0 | 24 | — | — | 2 | — |
| 21 | Cheyelle Robins-Reti | 29 | Wing, Centre | 2023 | 18 | 10 | 1 | 29 | 5 | 0 | 20 | — | — | 1 | — |
| 22 | Botille Vette-Welsh | 30 | Five-eighth, Fullback | 2018 | 3 4 5 16 | 11 | 6 | 45 | 6 | 0 | 24 | — | 3 | 1 | 5 |
| – | Lacey Cross | 18 | Prop | — | — | R | — | 0 | 0 | 0 | 0 | — | — | — | — |
| – | Nakia Davis-Welsh | 30 | Wing, Fullback | 2023 | 2 4 | 8 | — | 14 | 3 | 0 | 12 | — | 3 | 4 | 7 |
| – | Grace Giampino | 22 | Centre | 2025 | — | 4 | 4 | 8 | 0 | 0 | 0 | — | — | — | — |
| – | Joeli Morris | 24 | Lock | 2021 | 7 | 4 | — | 11 | 1 | 0 | 4 | 1 | — | — | — |
| – | Sienna Thomas | 19 | Halfback | — | — | R | — | 0 | 0 | 0 | 0 | — | — | — | — |
| DV | Mariah Brown | 20 | Centre | — | — | R | — | 0 | 0 | 0 | 0 | — | — | — | — |
| IS | Damita Betham | 20 | Centre | — | — | U7s | H | 0 | 0 | 0 | 0 | — | — | — | — |
| IS | Ella-Jaye Harrison-Leaunoa | 19 | Five-eighth | — | — | R | H | 0 | 0 | 0 | 0 | — | — | 3 | — |
| IS | Yasmin Meakes | 32 | Second-row, Centre | 2020 | — | 13 | 3 | 55 | 15 | 0 | 60 | — | — | — | — |
| IS | Evie Jones | 21 | Five-eighth | 2024 | 5 | R | H | 5 | 2 | 0 | 8 | — | — | — | — |

Notes:

- Damita Betham and Grace Giampino have each been signed on a supplementary contact for 2026.
- The following players have been signed on a development contract for 2026:
  - Emily McArthur
  - Lucy Spain
  - Mariah Brown
  - Sienna Thomas
- Ella-Jaye Harrison-Leaunoa was signed on a development contract but was subsequently upgraded to a full contract.
- Following the first round, the club reported that three players would miss the 2026 season due to injury (Damita Betham, Ella-Jaye Harrison-Leaunoa, and Evie Jones) and a fourth (Lilly-Ann White) was expected to miss up to eight weeks.
- Captain Yasmin Meakes sustained a season-ending ACL injury in Round 3. Kayla Romaniuk was appointed captain for the remainder of the season.
- The following players were signed on a development contract for 2025:
  - Fane Finau
  - Mariah Brown
  - Grace Giampino
  - Mercedez Taulelei-Siala
  - Emily McArthur (added in September)

The Newcastle Knights announced contract extensions in several instalments from September 2025. The Newcastle Knights announced player signings in several instalments from October 2025.

=== Players in ===
- Tori Shipton from Dragons

=== Players extended ===
- Tiana Davison (2029)
- Olivia Higgins (2027)
- Georgia Roche (2030)
- Sidney Taylor (2028)

=== Players out ===
Off contract

- Nakia Davis-Welsh
- Fane Finau
- Stella Lewis
- Joeli Morris
- Cheyelle Robins-Reti
- Mercedez Taulelei-Siala
- Sienna Yeo
- Grace Giampino (Sup)
- Emily McArthur (Dev)
- Lucy Spain (Dev)

==== Off contract after 2027 ====
- Olivia Higgins
- Evie Jones
- Simone Karpani
- Jules Kirkpatrick
- Yasmin Meakes
- Amelia Pasikala
- Botille Vette-Welsh
- Lilly-Ann White
- Tenika Willison

== Individual awards ==
=== Club awards ===
The Newcastle Knights player of the year and other club award winners.

| Season | Player of the Year | Player's Player | Gladiator | Knight in Shining Armour | Rookie of the Year | Community Player of the Year | Ref |
|---|---|---|---|---|---|---|---|
| 2021 | Annetta-Claudia Nu'uausala | Annetta-Claudia Nu'uausala | — | — | — | — | |
| 2022 | Shanice Parker & Jesse Southwell | Tamika Upton & Yasmin Clydsdale | Caitlan Johnston-Green | — | Jesse Southwell | Millie Elliott | |
| 2023 | Tamika Upton | Tamika Upton & Shanice Parker | Yasmin Meakes | — | Sheridan Gallagher | Kayla Romaniuk | |
| 2024 | Tamika Upton | Laishon Albert-Jones | Olivia Higgins | Yasmin Meakes | Tenika Willison | Kayla Romaniuk | |
| 2025 | Yasmin Meakes | Jesse Southwell | Sheridan Gallagher | Yasmin Meakes | Sienna Yeo & Jules Kirkpatrick | Kayla Romaniuk | |

Notes:
- The following NRLW awards were given in the 2022 and 2023 seasons:
  - 2022 Thrive Award: Caitlan Johnston-Green.
  - 2023 Coaches Award: Yasmin Meakes; Thrive Award: Tiana Davison.
- Yasmin Meakes played as Yasmin Clydsdale between 2022 and 2025.
- Millie Elliott played as Millie Boyle in 2022.
- Caitlan Johnston-Green played as Caitlan Johnston in 2022.

=== Dally M winners ===
| Season | Year | Ref |
|---|---|---|
| 2023 | Tamika Upton | |

== Club records ==
Win-loss record since entering the NRLW in 2021

| Games | Wins | Drawn | Loss | Points for | Points against | +/- | Win % |
|---|---|---|---|---|---|---|---|
| 58 | 35 | 0 | 23 | 1,352 | 1,012 | +340 | 60.34% |

=== Individual records ===
Lists and tables last updated: 21 September 2026.

==== Career records (at the Knights) ====
===== Most games for the Knights =====
Qualification: 20 games

| Rank | Player | Span | Games |
|---|---|---|---|
| 1 | Shanice Parker | 2022–present | 53 |
| 2 | Olivia Higgins | 2022–present | 52 |
| 3 | Tayla Predebon | 2022–present | 49 |
| 4 | Kayla Romaniuk | 2022–present | 48 |
| 5 | Yasmin Meakes | 2022–present | 44 |
| 6 | Georgia Roche | 2023–present | 42 |
| 7 | Jesse Southwell | 2022–2025 | 40 |
| 8 | Simone Karpani | 2022–present | 35 |
| 9 | Tiana Davison | 2022–present | 32 |
| 9 | Sheridan Gallagher | 2023–2025 | 32 |
| 11 | Tenika Willison | 2024–present | 31 |
| 12 | Tamika Upton | 2022–2024 | 26 |
| 13 | Sienna Yeo | 2025–present | 25 |
| 14 | Kirra Dibb | 2021–present | 24 |
| 15 | Jules Kirkpatrick | 2025–present | 22 |
| 16 | Caitlan Johnston-Green | 2021–2024 | 20 |
| 16 | Abigail Roache | 2023–2024 | 20 |
| 16 | Laishon Albert-Jones | 2023–2024 | 20 |

===== Most points for the Knights =====
Qualification: 20 points

| Rank | Player | 2026 club | M | T | G | FG | Points |
|---|---|---|---|---|---|---|---|
| 1 | Jesse Southwell | | 40 | 7 | 102 | 0 | 232 |
| 2 | Kirra Dibb | | 24 | 3 | 61 | 0 | 134 |
| 3 | Sheridan Gallagher | | 32 | 25 | 7 | 0 | 114 |
| 4 | Tamika Upton | | 26 | 19 | 0 | 0 | 76 |
| 5 | Olivia Higgins | | 52 | 16 | 0 | 0 | 64 |
| 6 | Shanice Parker | | 53 | 15 | 0 | 0 | 60 |
| 7 | Mercedez Taulelei-Siala | | 13 | 14 | 0 | 0 | 56 |
| 8 | Yasmin Meakes | | 44 | 12 | 0 | 0 | 48 |
| 8 | Georgia Roche | | 42 | 10 | 4 | 0 | 48 |
| 10 | Tayla Predebon | | 49 | 10 | 0 | 0 | 40 |
| 10 | Tenika Willison | | 31 | 10 | 0 | 0 | 40 |
| 12 | Abigail Roache | | 20 | 9 | 0 | 0 | 36 |
| 13 | Kayla Romaniuk | | 48 | 6 | 0 | 0 | 24 |
| 13 | Lilly-Ann White | | 13 | 6 | 0 | 0 | 24 |
| 13 | Fane Finau | | 14 | 6 | 0 | 0 | 24 |
| 16 | Romy Teitzel | | 12 | 5 | 0 | 0 | 20 |
| 16 | Tiana Davison | | 32 | 5 | 0 | 0 | 20 |

===== Most tries for the Knights =====
Qualification: 5 tries

| Rank | Player | Tries |
|---|---|---|
| 1 | Sheridan Gallagher | 25 |
| 2 | Tamika Upton | 19 |
| 3 | Olivia Higgins | 16 |
| 4 | Shanice Parker | 15 |
| 5 | Mercedez Taulelei-Siala | 14 |
| 6 | Yasmin Meakes | 12 |
| 7 | Tayla Predebon | 10 |
| 7 | Georgia Roche | 10 |
| 7 | Tenika Willison | 10 |
| 10 | Abigail Roache | 9 |
| 11 | Jesse Southwell | 7 |
| 12 | Kayla Romaniuk | 6 |
| 12 | Lilly-Ann White | 6 |
| 12 | Fane Finau | 6 |
| 15 | Romy Teitzel | 5 |
| 15 | Tiana Davison | 5 |

===== Most goals for the Knights =====
All goal kickers

| Rank | Player | Goals |
|---|---|---|
| 1 | Jesse Southwell | 102 |
| 2 | Kirra Dibb | 61 |
| 3 | Sheridan Gallagher | 7 |
| 4 | Georgia Roche | 4 |
| 5 | Charntay Poko | 2 |

===== Most field goals for the Knights =====
No instances to date

==== Season records ====
Season length has increased over time as the competition has expanded.

===== Most points in a season for the Knights =====
Qualification: 20 points

| Rank | Player | Season | M | T | G | FG | Points |
|---|---|---|---|---|---|---|---|
| 1 | Kirra Dibb | 2026 | 12 | 2 | 42 | 0 | 92 |
| 2 | Jesse Southwell | 2025 | 13 | 2 | 41 | 0 | 90 |
| 3 | Jesse Southwell | 2023 | 11 | 3 | 33 | 0 | 78 |
| 4 | Mercedez Taulelei-Siala | 2026 | 12 | 13 | 0 | 0 | 52 |
| 5 | Jesse Southwell | 2024 | 9 | 0 | 22 | 0 | 44 |
| 6 | Sheridan Gallagher | 2024 | 8 | 9 | 3 | 0 | 42 |
| 7 | Sheridan Gallagher | 2023 | 11 | 7 | 4 | 0 | 36 |
| 7 | Sheridan Gallagher | 2025 | 13 | 9 | 0 | 0 | 36 |
| 9 | Kirra Dibb | 2022 | 7 | 1 | 15 | 0 | 34 |
| 10 | Tamika Upton | 2023 | 11 | 7 | 0 | 0 | 28 |
| 10 | Tamika Upton | 2024 | 10 | 7 | 0 | 0 | 28 |
| 12 | Shanice Parker | 2023 | 11 | 6 | 0 | 0 | 24 |
| 12 | Abigail Roache | 2023 | 11 | 6 | 0 | 0 | 24 |
| 14 | Jesse Southwell | 2022 | 7 | 2 | 6 | 0 | 20 |
| 14 | Tamika Upton | 2022 | 5 | 5 | 0 | 0 | 20 |
| 14 | Sidney Taylor | 2026 | 12 | 5 | 0 | 0 | 20 |

===== Most tries in a season for the Knights =====
Qualification: 4 tries

| Rank | Player | Season | M | Tries |
|---|---|---|---|---|
| 1 | Mercedez Taulelei-Siala | 2026 | 12 | 13 |
| 2 | Sheridan Gallagher | 2024 | 8 | 9 |
| 2 | Sheridan Gallagher | 2025 | 13 | 9 |
| 4 | Sheridan Gallagher | 2023 | 11 | 7 |
| 4 | Tamika Upton | 2023 | 11 | 7 |
| 4 | Tamika Upton | 2024 | 10 | 7 |
| 7 | Shanice Parker | 2023 | 11 | 6 |
| 7 | Abigail Roache | 2023 | 11 | 6 |
| 9 | Tamika Upton | 2022 | 5 | 5 |
| 9 | Sidney Taylor | 2026 | 12 | 5 |
| 11 | Kiana Takairangi | 2022 | 6 | 4 |
| 11 | Yasmin Meakes | 2023 | 11 | 4 |
| 11 | Olivia Higgins | 2023 | 11 | 4 |
| 11 | Jasmin Strange | 2023 | 11 | 4 |
| 11 | Olivia Higgins | 2024 | 10 | 4 |
| 11 | Tenika Willison | 2024 | 7 | 4 |
| 11 | Georgia Roche | 2025 | 13 | 4 |
| 11 | Keighley Simpson | 2025 | 3 | 4 |
| 11 | Tess Staines | 2025 | 6 | 4 |
| 11 | Fane Finau | 2026 | 10 | 4 |
| 11 | Shanice Parker | 2026 | 12 | 4 |
| 11 | Tenika Willison | 2026 | 12 | 4 |

==== Match records ====
===== Most points in a game for the Knights =====
Qualification: 12 points

| Rank | Player | Date | Opponent | Venue | T | G | FG | Points |
|---|---|---|---|---|---|---|---|---|
| 1 | Jesse Southwell | 7 Sep 2025 | Titans | McDonald Jones Stadium | 2 | 4 | 0 | 16 |
| 2 | Kirra Dibb | 5 Sep 2026 | Bulldogs | McDonald Jones Stadium | 0 | 8 | 0 | 16 |
| 3 | Kirra Dibb | 25 Sep 2022 | Dragons | Suncorp Stadium | 1 | 5 | 0 | 14 |
| 3 | Sheridan Gallagher | 1 Sep 2024 | Tigers | McDonald Jones Stadium | 2 | 3 | 0 | 14 |
| 5 | Jesse Southwell | 22 Jul 2023 | Dragons | McDonald Jones Stadium | 1 | 4 | 0 | 12 |
| 5 | Jesse Southwell | 20 Jul 2025 | Warriors | McDonald Jones Stadium | 0 | 6 | 0 | 12 |
| 5 | Sheridan Gallagher | 14 Sep 2023 | Tigers | Leichhardt Oval | 1 | 4 | 0 | 12 |
| 5 | Sheridan Gallagher | 14 Sep 2024 | Titans | Cbus Super Stadium | 3 | 0 | 0 | 12 |
| 5 | Jesse Southwell | 2 Sep 2023 | Raiders | GIO Stadium | 1 | 4 | 0 | 12 |
| 5 | Lilly-Ann White | 31 Aug 2025 | Sharks | Sharks Stadium | 3 | 0 | 0 | 12 |
| 5 | Keighley Simpson | 14 Sep 2025 | Dragons | McDonald Jones Stadium | 3 | 0 | 0 | 12 |
| 5 | Mercedez Taulelei-Siala | 29 Aug 2026 | Cowboys | Queensland Country Bank Stadium | 3 | 0 | 0 | 12 |
| 5 | Kirra Dibb | 29 Aug 2026 | Cowboys | Queensland Country Bank Stadium | 0 | 6 | 0 | 12 |
| 5 | Tayla Predebon | 5 Sep 2026 | Bulldogs | McDonald Jones Stadium | 3 | 0 | 0 | 12 |

===== Most tries in a game for the Knights =====
Qualification: 2 tries

| Rank | Player | Date | Opponent | Venue | Tries |
|---|---|---|---|---|---|
| 1 | Sheridan Gallagher | 14 Sep 2024 | Titans | Cbus Super Stadium | 3 |
| 1 | Lilly-Ann White | 31 Aug 2025 | Sharks | Sharks Stadium | 3 |
| 1 | Keighley Simpson | 14 Sep 2025 | Dragons | McDonald Jones Stadium | 3 |
| 1 | Mercedez Taulelei-Siala | 29 Aug 2026 | Cowboys | Queensland Country Bank Stadium | 3 |
| 1 | Tayla Predebon | 5 Sep 2026 | Bulldogs | McDonald Jones Stadium | 3 |
| 6 | Tamika Upton | 25 Sep 2022 | Dragons | Suncorp Stadium | 2 |
| 6 | Kiana Takairangi | 2 Oct 2022 | Eels | Accor Stadium | 2 |
| 6 | Sheridan Gallagher | 30 Jul 2023 | Cowboys | Belmore Sports Ground | 2 |
| 6 | Abigail Roache | 13 Aug 2023 | Titans | McDonald Jones Stadium | 2 |
| 6 | Abigail Roache | 14 Sep 2023 | Wests Tigers | Leichhardt Oval | 2 |
| 6 | Shanice Parker | 20 Aug 2023 | Broncos | McDonald Jones Stadium | 2 |
| 6 | Shanice Parker | 27 Aug 2023 | Sharks | McDonald Jones Stadium | 2 |
| 6 | Tamika Upton | 9 Sep 2023 | Roosters | McDonald Jones Stadium | 2 |
| 6 | Tamika Upton | 1 Oct 2023 | Titans | Accor Stadium | 2 |
| 6 | Laishon Albert-Jones | 18 Aug 2024 | Sharks | PointsBet Stadium | 2 |
| 6 | Tamika Upton | 24 Aug 2024 | Eels | Eric Tweedale Stadium | 2 |
| 6 | Sheridan Gallagher | 1 Sep 2024 | Tigers | McDonald Jones Stadium | 2 |
| 6 | Yasmin Meakes | 14 Sep 2024 | Titans | Cbus Super Stadium | 2 |
| 6 | Sheridan Gallagher | 21 Sep 2024 | Cowboys | Queensland Country Bank Stadium | 2 |
| 6 | Evah McEwen | 9 Aug 2025 | Tigers | McDonald Jones Stadium | 2 |
| 6 | Sheridan Gallagher | 9 Aug 2025 | Tigers | McDonald Jones Stadium | 2 |
| 6 | Jesse Southwell | 7 Sep 2025 | Titans | McDonald Jones Stadium | 2 |
| 6 | Shanice Parker | 20 Sep 2025 | Titans | McDonald Jones Stadium | 2 |
| 6 | Mercedez Taulelei-Siala | 2 Aug 2026 | Eels | Geohex Park, Wagga Wagga | 2 |
| 6 | Fane Finau | 5 Sep 2026 | Bulldogs | McDonald Jones Stadium | 2 |
| 6 | Mercedez Taulelei-Siala | 13 Sep 2026 | Titans | McDonald Jones Stadium | 2 |

===== Most goals in a game for the Knights =====
Qualification: 4 goals

| Rank | Player | Date | Opponent | Venue | Goals |
|---|---|---|---|---|---|
| 1 | Kirra Dibb | 5 Sep 2026 | Bulldogs | McDonald Jones Stadium | 8 |
| 2 | Jesse Southwell | 20 Jul 2025 | Warriors | McDonald Jones Stadium | 6 |
| 2 | Kirra Dibb | 29 Aug 2026 | Cowboys | Queensland Country Bank Stadium | 6 |
| 4 | Jesse Southwell | 6 Aug 2023 | Eels | CommBank Stadium | 5 |
| 4 | Jesse Southwell | 24 Sep 2023 | Broncos | McDonald Jones Stadium | 5 |
| 4 | Jesse Southwell | 14 Sep 2024 | Titans | Cbus Super Stadium | 5 |
| 4 | Jesse Southwell | 21 Sep 2024 | Cowboys | Queensland Country Bank Stadium | 5 |
| 4 | Jesse Southwell | 12 Jul 2025 | Cowboys | Queensland Country Bank Stadium | 5 |
| 4 | Jesse Southwell | 27 Jul 2025 | Eels | Eric Tweedale Stadium | 5 |
| 4 | Jesse Southwell | 20 Sep 2025 | Titans | McDonald Jones Stadium | 5 |
| 4 | Kirra Dibb | 19 Jul 2026 | Dragons | McDonald Jones Stadium | 5 |
| 4 | Kirra Dibb | 19 Jul 2026 | Tigers | McDonald Jones Stadium | 5 |
| 13 | Kirra Dibb | 21 Aug 2022 | Broncos | McDonald Jones Stadium | 4 |
| 13 | Jesse Southwell | 22 Jul 2023 | Dragons | McDonald Jones Stadium | 4 |
| 13 | Jesse Southwell | 2 Sep 2023 | Raiders | GIO Stadium | 4 |
| 13 | Sheridan Gallagher | 14 Sep 2023 | Tigers | Leichhardt Oval | 4 |
| 13 | Georgia Roche | 24 Aug 2024 | Eels | Eric Tweedale Stadium | 4 |
| 13 | Jesse Southwell | 8 Sep 2024 | Broncos | McDonald Jones Stadium | 4 |
| 13 | Jesse Southwell | 7 Sep 2025 | Titans | McDonald Jones Stadium | 4 |
| 13 | Kirra Dibb | 2 Aug 2026 | Eels | Geohex Park, Wagga Wagga | 4 |

==== First try and last try ====
Player who scored the first try and the most recent try for the Knights.

| Name | Year | Round | Minute | Opponent |
|---|---|---|---|---|
| Romy Teitzel | 2021 | 1 | 2' | Eels |
| Sidney Taylor | 2026 | EF | 68' | Broncos |

==== Oldest and youngest players ====
The oldest and youngest players to represent the Newcastle Knights NRLW team.

| Name | Age | Year |
|---|---|---|
| Krystal Rota | 36 and 168 days | 2022 |
| Jesse Southwell | 17 and 189 days | 2022 |

=== Margins and streaks ===
Biggest winning margin
Qualification: 20 point margin

| Margin | Score | Opponent | Venue | Date | Round |
|---|---|---|---|---|---|
| 38 | 38–0 | Dragons | McDonald Jones Stadium | 19 Jul 2026 | 3 |
| 36 | 46–10 | Titans | Cbus Super Stadium | 14 Sep 2024 | 8 |
| 34 | 38-4 | Eels | Eric Tweedale Stadium | 6 Aug 2023 | 3 |
| 34 | 40-6 | Cowboys | Queensland Country Bank Stadium | 29 Aug 2026 | 9 |
| 34 | 56-22 | Bulldogs | McDonald Jones Stadium | 5 Sep 2026 | 10 |
| 32 | 38-6 | Cowboys | Queensland Country Bank Stadium | 21 Sep 2024 | 9 |
| 28 | 34-6 | Tigers | McDonald Jones Stadium | 1 Sep 2024 | 6 |
| 24 | 30-6 | Tigers | McDonald Jones Stadium | 9 Aug 2025 | 6 |
| 24 | 30-6 | Dragons | Suncorp Stadium | 25 Sep 2022 | Semi final |
| 24 | 30-6 | Eels | Eric Tweedale Stadium | 27 Jul 2025 | 4 |
| 22 | 30-8 | Dragons | Central Coast Stadium | 18 Sep 2022 | 5 |
| 20 | 32-12 | Eels | Accor Stadium | 2 Oct 2022 | Grand Final |
| 20 | 28-8 | Tigers | Leichhardt Oval | 14 Sep 2023 | 9 |
| 20 | 36-16 | Eels | Eric Tweedale Stadium | 24 Aug 2024 | 5 |
| 20 | 26-6 | Cowboys | Queensland Country Bank Stadium | 12 Jul 2025 | 2 |
| 20 | 32-12 | Eels | Geohex Park, Wagga Wagga | 2 Aug 2026 | 5 |

Biggest losing margin
Qualification: 10 point margin

| Margin | Score | Opponent | Venue | Date | Round |
|---|---|---|---|---|---|
| 36 | 4–40 | Dragons | McDonald Jones Stadium | 20 Mar 2022 | 4 |
| 30 | 16-46 | Broncos | McDonald Jones Stadium | 24 Aug 2025 | 8 |
| 24 | 6-30 | Broncos | Suncorp Stadium | 28 Sep 2025 | Preliminary final |
| 24 | 16-40 | Broncos | Totally Workwear Stadium | 19 Sep 2026 | Elimination final |
| 18 | 10-28 | Broncos | WIN Stadium | 6 Mar 2022 | 2 |
| 18 | 12-30 | Broncos | Totally Workwear Stadium | 26 Jul 2026 | 4 |
| 16 | 12-28 | Roosters | Sydney Cricket Ground | 12 Mar 2022 | 3 |
| 16 | 14-30 | Roosters | Polytec Stadium | 17 Aug 2025 | 7 |
| 14 | 12-26 | Bulldogs | Accor Stadium | 4 Jul 2025 | 1 |
| 12 | 20-32 | Titans | McDonald Jones Stadium | 13 Sep 2026 | 11 |
| 11 | 20-31 | Cowboys | Belmore Sports Ground | 30 Jul 2023 | 2 |

Most consecutive wins

- 11 (6 August 2023 – 3 August 2024)

Most consecutive losses

- 5 (27 February 2022 – 27 March 2022)

Biggest comeback

- Recovered from 12 point deficit (twice).
  - Trailed Brisbane Broncos 4-16 after 57 minutes at McDonald Jones Stadium on August 20 2023 and won 22-20.
  - Trailed St George Illawarra Dragons 4-16 after 34 minutes at McDonald Jones Stadium on September 14 2025 and won 30-22.

Worst collapse

- Surrendered 14 point lead (twice)
  - Led Brisbane Broncos 18-4 after 46 minutes at McDonald Jones Stadium on September 8 2024 and lost 24-32
  - Led Cronulla Sharks 18-4 after 61 minutes at Sharks Stadium on August 31 2025 and lost 18-19.

== Inaugural and Grand Final teams ==
First game and first win

| Result | Score | Opponent | Venue | Date | Season | Round | Ref |
|---|---|---|---|---|---|---|---|
| Lost | 12–13 | Parramatta Eels | McDonald Jones Stadium | 27 Feb 2022 | 2021 | 1 | |
| Won | 32–14 | Brisbane Broncos | McDonald Jones Stadium | 21 Aug 2022 | 2022 | 1 | |

=== First team ===
The first Newcastle Knights team played the Parramatta Eels on 27 February 2022 at McDonald Jones Stadium. The Eels won the match 13-12.

| Jersey | Position | Player |
|---|---|---|
| 1 | Fullback | Romy Teitzel (c) |
| 2 | Wing | Katelyn Vaha'akolo |
| 3 | Centre | Jayme Fressard |
| 4 | Centre | Bobbi Law |
| 5 | Wing | Katie Green |
| 6 | Five-eighth | Autumn-Rain Stephens-Daly |
| 7 | Halfback | Tahlulah Tillett |
| 8 | Prop | Caitlan Johnston-Green |
| 9 | Hooker | Krystal Rota |
| 10 | Prop | Annetta-Claudia Nu'uausala |
| 11 | Second-row | Rangimarie Edwards-Bruce |
| 12 | Second-row | Georgia Page |
| 13 | Lock | Charntay Poko |
| 14 | Hooker | Emma Manzelmann |
| 15 | Prop | Charlotte Scanlan |
| 16 | Prop | Phoebe Desmond |
| 17 | Halfback | Kirra Dibb |
| | Coach | Casey Bromilow |

=== Grand Final appearances ===
| Result | Score | Opponent | Venue | Date | Ref |
|---|---|---|---|---|---|
| Won | 32–12 | Parramatta Eels | Accor Stadium | 2 Oct 2022 | |
| Won | 24–18 | Gold Coast Titans | Accor Stadium | 1 Oct 2023 | |

=== Premiership winning teams ===
The Newcastle Knights premiership winning teams from the 2022 and 2023 NRL Women's Premiership Grand Final.

2022 Grand Final

Newcastle Knights 32 defeated Parramatta Eels 12 at Accor Stadium on 2 October 2022.

| Jersey | Position | Player |
|---|---|---|
| 1 | Fullback | Tamika Upton |
| 2 | Wing | Kiana Takairangi |
| 3 | Centre | Shanice Parker |
| 4 | Centre | Bobbi Law |
| 5 | Wing | Emmanita Paki |
| 6 | Five-eighth | Kirra Dibb |
| 7 | Halfback | Jesse Southwell |
| 8 | Prop | Caitlan Johnston-Green |
| 9 | Hooker | Olivia Higgins |
| 10 | Prop | Millie Elliott (c) |
| 11 | Second-row | Romy Teitzel |
| 12 | Second-row | Yasmin Meakes |
| 13 | Lock | Kayla Romaniuk |
| 14 | Hooker | Emma Manzelmann |
| 15 | Prop | Tayla Predebon |
| 16 | Prop | Simone Karpani |
| 17 | Five-eighth | Caitlin Moran |
| | Coach | Ronald Griffiths |

2023 Grand Final

Newcastle Knights 24 defeated Gold Coast Titans 18 at Accor Stadium on 1 October 2023.

| Jersey | Position | Player |
|---|---|---|
| 1 | Fullback | Tamika Upton |
| 2 | Wing | Sheridan Gallagher |
| 3 | Centre | Shanice Parker |
| 4 | Centre | Abigail Roache |
| 5 | Wing | Jasmin Strange |
| 6 | Five-eighth | Georgia Roche |
| 7 | Halfback | Jesse Southwell |
| 8 | Prop | Tayla Predebon |
| 9 | Hooker | Olivia Higgins |
| 10 | Prop | Caitlan Johnston-Green |
| 11 | Second-row | Laishon Albert-Jones |
| 12 | Second-row | Yasmin Meakes |
| 13 | Lock | Hannah Southwell (c) |
| 14 | Hooker | Nita Maynard-Perrin |
| 15 | Lock | Tiana Davison |
| 16 | Prop | Kayla Romaniuk |
| 17 | Prop | Rima Butler |
| | Coach | Ronald Griffiths |

== Representative honours ==
=== National team representatives ===
| Player | Club debut | Country | International debut | Years | Ref |
|---|---|---|---|---|---|
| Laishon Albert-Jones | 22 Jul 2023 | New Zealand | **25 Jun 2022** | 2023 | |
| Ngatokotoru Arakua | 6 Mar 2022 | New Zealand | **5 May 2017** | 2022 | |
| Charlotte Arnopp-Scanlan | 27 Feb 2022 | New Zealand | **8 Jul 2013** | 2022 | |
| Yasmin Clydsdale | 21 Aug 2022 | Australia | 2 Nov 2022 | 2022–2025 | |
| Tiana Davison | 4 Sep 2022 | New Zealand | 21 Oct 2023 | 2023, 2025 | |
| Fane Finau | 7 Sep 2025 | Tonga | 25 Oct 2025 | 2025 | |
| Olivia Higgins | 21 Aug 2022 | Australia | 18 Oct 2024 | 2024–2025 | |
| Caitlan Johnston-Green | 27 Feb 2022 | Australia | 2 Nov 2022 | 2022–2023 | |
| Simone Karpani | 21 Aug 2022 | Samoa | 19 Oct 2024 | 2024–2025 | |
| Tamerah Leati | 22 Jul 2023 | Samoa | 15 Oct 2023 | 2023 | |
| Evah McEwen | 21 Sep 2024 | Samoa | 19 Oct 2024 | 2024 | |
| Shanice Parker | 21 Aug 2022 | New Zealand | 2 Nov 2022 | 2022–2025 | |
| Abigail Roache | 22 Jul 2023 | New Zealand | **10 Nov 2022** | 2023–2024 | |
| Georgia Roche | 6 Aug 2023 | England | **27 Oct 2018** | 2023, 2025 | |
| Krystal Rota | 27 Feb 2022 | New Zealand | **3 May 2015** | 2022 | |
| Jesse Southwell | 21 Aug 2022 | Australia | 26 Oct 2025 | 2025 | |
| Autumn-Rain Stephens-Daly | 27 Feb 2022 | New Zealand | 25 Jun 2022 | 2022 | |
| Kiana Takairangi | 21 Aug 2022 | Cook Islands | 2 Nov 2022 | 2022 | |
| Mercedez Taulelei-Siala | 14 Sep 2025 | Samoa | **19 Oct 2024** | 2025 | |
| Viena Tinao | 22 Jul 2023 | Samoa | 10 Nov 2024 | 2024 | |
| Tamika Upton | 21 Aug 2022 | Australia | 14 Oct 2023 | 2023–2024 | |
| Katelyn Vaha'akolo | 27 Feb 2022 | New Zealand | 25 Jun 2022 | 2022 | |
| Kararaina Wira-Kohu | 20 Mar 2022 | New Zealand | 25 Jun 2022 | 2022 | |

Notes:

- International debut dates in **bold** indicate that the player made her first international appearance prior to playing for the Newcastle Knights NRLW team.
- Tiana Davison represented New Zealand in 2024 as well as 2023 and 2025, but had played the 2024 season with the Sydney Roosters.

=== Women's State of Origin representatives ===
Past and current players who have played for Queensland and New South Wales in the State of Origin.

| Player | State | Year(s) |
|---|---|---|
| Yasmin Clydsdale | New South Wales | 2023–2025 |
| Kirra Dibb | New South Wales | 2022 |
| Olivia Higgins | New South Wales | 2024 |
| Caitlan Johnston-Green | New South Wales | 2022–2024 |
| Jesse Southwell | New South Wales | 2023, 2025 |
| Tamika Upton | Queensland | 2023–2024 |

=== Prime Minister's XIII representatives ===
Past and current players who have been selected to play in the Prime Minister's XIII.

| Player | Year(s) |
|---|---|
| Jesse Southwell | 2024 |
| Kayla Romaniuk | 2025 |

=== All-Stars representatives ===
Past and current players who have played for the Indigenous All-Stars or for the Māori All-Stars.

==== Indigenous All Stars ====
| Player | Year(s) |
|---|---|
| Bobbi Law | 2022 |
| Kirra Dibb | 2022, 2026 |
| Tahlulah Tillett | 2022 |
| Caitlan Johnston-Green | 2022 |
| Evah McEwen | 2025 |

==== Māori All Stars (Māori people) ====
| Player | Year(s) |
|---|---|
| Krystal Rota | 2022 |
| Rangimarie Edwards-Bruce | 2022 |
| Autumn-Rain Stephens-Daly | 2022 |
| Katelyn Vaha'akolo | 2022 |
| Jasmin Strange | 2023 |
| Shanice Parker | 2023–2026 |
| Rima Butler | 2024 |
| Lilly-Ann White | 2025 |
| Tenika Willison | 2026 |
| Fane Finau | 2026 |

== Feeder team seasons ==
The Newcastle Knights run women's pathways teams in the NSWRL Women's Premiership, the Tarsha Gale Cup, and the Lisa Fiaola Cup.

=== NSWRL Women's Premiership ===
| Season | Regular Season | | | | | | | | | Finals | | Ref |
| Season | P | W | D | L | B | F | A | Pts | Pos | Top | Placing | Ref |
|---|---|---|---|---|---|---|---|---|---|---|---|---|
| 2022 | 8 | 4 | 1 | 3 | 1 | 130 | 104 | 11 | 5th | 4 | — | |
| 2023 | 10 | 6 | 0 | 4 | 1 | 236 | 148 | 14 | 5th | 4 | — | |
| 2024 | 11 | 7 | 0 | 4 | 0 | 284 | 168 | 14 | 4th | 4 | Grand Finalist | |
| 2025 | 11 | 10 | 0 | 1 | 0 | 274 | 106 | 20 | 1st | 4 | Grand Finalist | |
| 2026 | 11 | 10 | 0 | 1 | 0 | 306 | 134 | 20 | 1st | 5 | In progress | |

=== Tarsha Gale Cup ===
For Under 18 players from 2018 to 2020. Since 2021, the Cup is for Under 19 players.

| Season | Regular Season | | | | | | | | | Finals | | Ref |
| Season | P | W | D | L | B | F | A | Pts | Pos | Top | Placing | Ref |
|---|---|---|---|---|---|---|---|---|---|---|---|---|
| 2018 | 8 | 5 | 0 | 3 | 1 | 366 | 222 | 12 | 4th | 8 | Grand Finalist | |
| 2019 | 9 | 8 | 0 | 1 | 0 | 320 | 112 | 16 | 2nd | 8 | Grand Finalist | |
| 2020 | 5 | 1 | 0 | 4 | 0 | 54 | 110 | 2 | 9th | 8 | — | |
| 2021 | 8 | 7 | 0 | 1 | 1 | 204 | 64 | 16 | 1st | 6 | Semi-Finalist | |
| 2022 | 8 | 5 | 2 | 1 | 1 | 208 | 56 | 14 | 3rd | 6 | Grand Finalist | |
| 2023 | 8 | 6 | 0 | 2 | 1 | 168 | 86 | 14 | 3rd | 6 | Semi-Finalist | |
| 2024 | 8 | 5 | 1 | 2 | 1 | 202 | 98 | 13 | 5th | 6 | Grand Finalist | |
| 2025 | 8 | 5 | 0 | 3 | 1 | 164 | 112 | 12 | 6th | 8 | Elimination Finalist | |
| 2026 | 8 | 5 | 0 | 3 | 1 | 224 | 116 | 12 | 6th | 8 | Preliminary Finalist | |

=== Lisa Fiaola Cup ===
For Under 17 players.

| Season | Regular Season | | | | | | | | | Finals | | Ref |
| Season | P | W | D | L | B | F | A | Pts | Pos | Top | Placing | Ref |
|---|---|---|---|---|---|---|---|---|---|---|---|---|
| 2024 | 8 | 5 | 0 | 3 | 1 | 212 | 108 | 12 | 6th | 6 | Semi-Finalist | |
| 2025 | 8 | 5 | 0 | 3 | 1 | 152 | 108 | 12 | 7th | 8 | Elimination Finalist | |
| 2026 | 8 | 8 | 0 | 0 | 1 | 264 | 76 | 18 | 2nd | 8 | Preliminary Finalist | |
