= Georgia Roche =

England international rugby league footballer

Personal information
- Full name: Georgia Elizabeth Roche
- Born: 3 September 2000 (age 26) Batley, West Yorkshire England
- Height: 160 cm (5 ft 3 in)
- Weight: 75 kg (11 st 11 lb)

Playing information
- Position: Stand-off, Scrum-half, Loose forward
Club
Years	Team	Pld	T	G	FG	P
2017	Featherstone Rovers
2018–21	Castleford Tigers
2022	Leeds Rhinos	7	5	0	0	20
2023–	Newcastle Knights	42	10	4	0	48
	Total	49	15	4	0	68
Representative
Years	Team	Pld	T	G	FG	P
2018–26	England	15	7	0	0	28
- Source: As of 30 October 2026

Georgia Roche (born 3 September 2000) is an English professional rugby league footballer for the Newcastle Knights in the NRL Women's Premiership. She plays at either stand-off, scrum-half or loose forward. She previously played for the Leeds Rhinos in the Rugby Football League Women's Super League.

== Career ==
Roche began her rugby league career playing for Drighlington ARLFC before moving to neighbouring amateur club Dewsbury Moor, during which time she represented Yorkshire in the 2018 Women's Rugby League Association County of Origin against Lancashire and scored Yorkshire's only points in a 10–4 defeat.

In 2017 Roche joined Featherstone Rovers Ladies, for the inaugural season of the Women's Super League. At the end of the season Featherstone qualified for the Grand Final and Roche scored all of Featherstone's points (1 try, 1 goal) in a 36–6 defeat to Bradford Bulls Women.

Over the winter Roche moved from Featherstone to Castleford and helped Castleford to the final of the 2018 RFL Women's Challenge Cup. In the final she scored one of Castleford's three tries in the 20–14 defeat to Leeds Rhinos Women.

At the 2018 Man of Steel Awards on 8 October 2018 Roche was named as the inaugural winner of the Woman of Steel award. In the same month Roche was one of the ten nominees for the 2018 BBC Young Sports Personality of the Year and was also shortlisted for the first women's Golden Boot Award. Roche made her international debut for England against France in Carcasonne on 27 October 2018, scoring two tries in England's 54–4 win.

Following a 2019 domestic season in which Roche helped Castleford to the League Leaders Shield in the 2019 RFL Women's Super League she was selected to be part of the England squads for both the test series against the Papua New Guinea Orchids and the World 9s tournament in October and November 2019.

Roche played in the June 2021 Test Match for England against Wales.

In 2023, she signed a 5-year contract with Australian side, Newcastle Knights in the NRL Women's Premiership. In round 3 of the 2023 NRLW season, she made her NRLW debut for the Knights against the Parramatta Eels. She went on to play in the 2023 NRLW Grand Final, starting at five-eighth in the Knights' 24-18 victory.
