= Sheridan Gallagher =

Australia international rugby league & association football player

Personal information
- Full name: Sheridan Lea Gallagher
- Born: Sheridan Lea Gallagher; 2 January 2002 (age 24) Douglas Park, New South Wales, Australia
- Height: 170 cm (5 ft 7 in)
- Weight: 82 kg (12 st 13 lb)

Playing information
- Position: Wing, Fullback
Club
Years	Team	Pld	T	G	FG	P
2023–25	Newcastle Knights	32	25	7	0	114
2026–	Canberra Raiders	13	3	7	0	26
	Total	45	28	14	0	140
Representative
Years	Team	Pld	T	G	FG	P
2026	Australia	1	0	0	0	0
- Source: As of 15 November 2026
Association football career
Senior career*
Years	Team	Apps	(Gls)
2021	Western Sydney Wanderers		
2024–2025	Newcastle Jets		
International career
2022	Young Matildas		
- * Club domestic league appearances and goals

Sheridan Lea Gallagher (born 2 January 2002) is an Australian professional rugby league footballer who currently plays for the Canberra Raiders in the NRL Women's Premiership. Her positions are wing and fullback. She also played association football for Western Sydney Wanderers and Newcastle Jets in the A-League Women competition.

== Background ==
Gallagher was born in Douglas Park, New South Wales. She attended Westfields Sports High School, where she was named the 2019 Sports Person of the Year. She also competed in show jumping as a teenager.

== Playing career ==
=== 2021 ===
In 2021, Gallagher played for the Western Sydney Wanderers in the A-League Women competition.

=== 2022 ===
In 2022, Gallagher captained the Young Matildas side at the 2022 FIFA U-20 Women's World Cup in Costa Rica.

=== 2023 ===
In 2023, Gallagher started playing rugby league for the Mount Pritchard Mounties in the NSWRL Women's Premiership.

In May, she signed a 1-year contract with NRLW team Newcastle Knights. In round 1 of the 2023 NRLW season, she made her NRLW debut for the Knights against the St. George Illawarra Dragons.

In October, Gallagher played on the wing and scored a try in the Knights' 24–18 Grand Final victory over the Gold Coast Titans.

=== Representative ===
She made her Australia international début in the 124-6 win over Wales on 1 November 2024 in the 2026 Women's Rugby League World Cup.
