= Abigail Roache =

NZ international rugby league & union player

- Born: 12 September 2000 (age 26) Auckland, New Zealand
- Height: 167 cm (5 ft 6 in)
- Weight: 70 kg (11 st 0 lb)
- Notable relative(s): Nathaniel Roache (brother); Paul Roache (brother)

Rugby union career
- Position(s): Wing, Centre
Provincial / State sides
Years	Team	Apps	(Points)
2019	Auckland Storm	5	(0)
Super Rugby
Years	Team	Apps	(Points)
2023	Chiefs Manawa	5	(0)
- Rugby league career

Playing information
- Position: Centre, Five-eighth
Club
Years	Team	Pld	T	G	FG	P
2023–24	Newcastle Knights	20	9	0	0	36
2025–	North Queensland Cowboys	18	3	0	0	12
	Total	38	12	0	0	48
Representative
Years	Team	Pld	T	G	FG	P
2022–26	New Zealand	13	4	0	0	16
- Source: RLP As of 14 November 2026

Abigail Roache (born 12 September 2000) is a New Zealand professional rugby league player who plays for the North Queensland Cowboys in the NRL Women's Premiership.

Primarily a centre, she has represented New Zealand and previously played for the Newcastle Knights. In rugby union, she played for the Chiefs Manawa in Super Rugby Aupiki and provincially for the Auckland Storm.

== Background ==
Born in Auckland, New Zealand, Roache is the younger sister of former NRL player, Nathaniel Roache. She tore her ACL in both knees before turning 20 and had further surgery to repair meniscus injuries.

== Rugby career ==
=== Rugby union ===
Roache was named in Auckland Storm's squad for the 2019 Farah Palmer Cup season. She joined Chiefs Manawa for the 2023 Super Rugby Aupiki season.

=== Rugby league ===
In 2022, Roache was awarded the Cathy Friend Women's Player of the Year for her outstanding performance for the Richmond Roses in the Auckland Rugby League competition.

Roache was initially left out of the Kiwi Ferns squad for the delayed 2021 Rugby League World Cup, but received a late call-up when Kararaina Wira-Kohu withdrew due to a torn calf days before the tournament. She made her Kiwi Ferns test debut on 10 November 2022 in their pool game loss to the Jillaroos at the World Cup. She also featured in her sides 20–6 semi-final victory over England. She started in the final, where the Kiwi Ferns lost 54–4 to the Jillaroos.

In May 2023, Roache signed a 2-year contract with NRL Women's Premiership side Newcastle Knights. In round 1 of the 2023 NRLW season, she made her NRLW debut for the Knights against the St. George Illawarra Dragons, scoring a try in the Knights' 32–16 win.

In October 2023, Roache played at centre in the Knights' 24-18 Grand Final win over the Gold Coast Titans.

After 20 games with the Knights, Roache parted ways with the club at the end of the 2024 season.

On 18 December 2024, she joined the North Queensland Cowboys on a three-year contract.
