= Laishon Albert-Jones =

NZ international rugby league player

Personal information
- Born: 17 October 1997 (age 29) Point Chevalier, New Zealand
- Height: 175 cm (5 ft 9 in)
- Weight: 90 kg (14 st 2 lb)

Playing information
- Position: Second-row
Club
Years	Team	Pld	T	G	FG	P
2023–24	Newcastle Knights	20	3	0	0	12
2025–	New Zealand Warriors	10	2	0	0	8
	Total	30	5	0	0	20
Representative
Years	Team	Pld	T	G	FG	P
2022	New Zealand	2	1	3	0	10
- Source: As of 1 November 2026
- Relatives: Stacey Jones (uncle)

Laishon Albert-Jones (born 17 October 1997) is a New Zealand professional rugby league footballer who currently plays for the New Zealand Warriors in the NRL Women's Premiership. Her positions are lock, second-row and five-eighth. She previously played for the Newcastle Knights and has represented New Zealand at international level.

== Background ==
Born in Point Chevalier, New Zealand, Albert-Jones played her junior rugby league for the Point Chevalier Pirates. She also spent time with the Richmond Roses and Akarana Falcons.

She is the niece of former New Zealand international and New Zealand Warriors player Stacey Jones.

== Playing career ==
=== 2021 ===
In 2021, while playing for the Richmond Roses, Albert-Jones won the Cathy Friend Medal as the Auckland Rugby League's 2021 women's player of the year.

=== 2022 ===
In 2022, Albert-Jones played two tests for the Kiwi Ferns.

=== 2023 ===
In May, Albert-Jones signed a two-year contract with NRLW side Newcastle Knights. In round 1 of the 2023 NRLW season, she made her NRLW debut for the Knights against the St. George Illawarra Dragons. She

Albert-Jones played at second-row in the Knights' 24-18 Grand Final win over the Gold Coast Titans.

=== 2024 ===
In September, Albert-Jones signed a 3-year contract with the New Zealand Warriors starting in 2025.
