= Hannah Southwell =

Australia rugby footballer (born 1999)

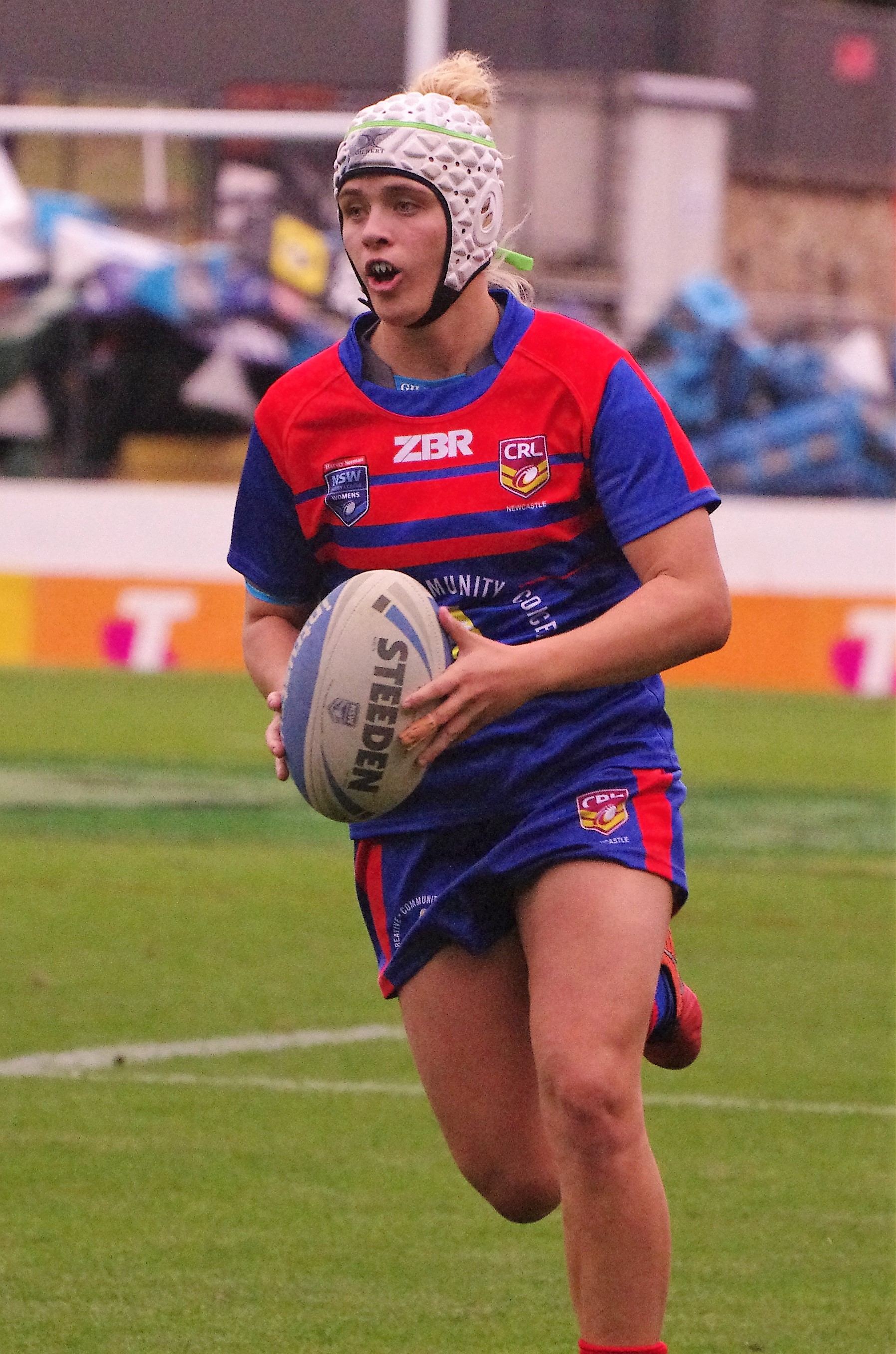
- Southwell in 2018

Personal information
- Born: 4 March 1999 (age 27) Newcastle, New South Wales, Australia
- Height: 172 cm (5 ft 8 in)
- Weight: 75 kg (11 st 11 lb; 165 lb)

Playing information
- Position: Lock, Second-row
Club
Years	Team	Pld	T	G	FG	P
2018	St George Illawarra Dragons	3	0	0	0	0
2019–21	Sydney Roosters	13	0	3	0	6
2022–24	Newcastle Knights	19	3	0	0	12
2025–	St George Illawarra Dragons	20	1	0	0	4
	Total	55	4	3	0	22
Representative
Years	Team	Pld	T	G	FG	P
2018–22	New South Wales	5	0	0	0	0
2018	Prime Minister's XIII	1	0	0	0	0
2018–19	Australia	2	0	0	0	0
2019	Australia 9s	2	1	0	0	5
- Source: RLP As of 8 November 2026
Association football career
- Position: Goalkeeper
Senior career*
Years	Team	Apps	(Gls)
2014–2016	Newcastle Jets	18	(0)
International career
2014	Australia U-17		
2014–2016	Australia U-20		
- * Club domestic league appearances and goals as of 15 October 2015
- Relatives: Jesse Southwell (sister)

Hannah Southwell (born 4 March 1999) is an Australian professional rugby league footballer who currently plays for the St George Illawarra Dragons in the NRL Women's Premiership. Primarily a lock, she is an Australian and New South Wales representative.

She previously played for the Sydney Roosters in the NRLW and the Central Coast Roosters in the NSWRL Women's Premiership. Before switching to rugby league, she played soccer for the Newcastle Jets in the W-League and for the Australia rugby sevens team.

== Background ==
Born in Newcastle, New South Wales, Southwell played junior rugby league for the Kotara Bears. At age 13, she gave up rugby league as she wasn't allowed to play anymore due to her age.

She is the older sister of Knights teammate Jesse Southwell.

== Soccer ==
=== Club ===
Southwell signed with Newcastle Jets in 2014. On 20 September 2014, she made her debut in a match against Perth Glory, becoming the league's youngest goalkeeper at the age of 15. She made six appearances for the team during the 2014–15 W-League season. Newcastle finished in fifth place during the regular season with a 5–5–2 record. During the 2015–16 W-League season, Southwell made 12 appearances for Newcastle and helped the team finish in sixth place with a 3–5–4 record.

=== International ===
Southwell represented Australia in the under-17 and under-20 national teams. In January 2016, Southwell earned a call-up to training camp for the Australia women's national soccer team.

== Rugby union ==
In late 2016, Southwell made the decision to switch codes and play rugby sevens. She made her first appearances for the Australian national team at the 2016 Oceania Women's Sevens Championship, Australia winning the Championship after defeating Fiji in the final.

== Rugby league ==
=== 2018 ===
In 2018, Southwell returned to rugby league, joining CRL Newcastle in the NSWRL Women's Premiership. In June, she represented NSW Country at the Women's National Championships.

On 22 June, she made her debut for New South Wales, coming off the bench in a 16–10 win over Queensland. On 27 July, she signed with the St George Illawarra Dragons NRL Women's Premiership team. In Round 1 of the 2018 NRL Women's season, she made her debut in the Dragons' 4–30 loss to the Brisbane Broncos.

On 6 October, she started at centre for the Prime Minister's XIII in their 40–4 win over Papua New Guinea. On 13 October, she made her Test debut for Australia, starting at centre in a 26–24 win over New Zealand.

=== 2019 ===
In May, Southwell represented NSW Country at the Women's National Championships. In July, she joined the Sydney Roosters NRLW side. On 21 June, she started at lock for New South Wales in their 14–4 win over Queensland.

In Round 1 of the 2019 NRL Women's season, she made her debut for the Roosters in a 12–16 loss to the New Zealand Warriors. In October, she represented Australia at the 2019 Rugby League World Cup 9s.

=== 2020 ===
In 2020, Southwell joined the Central Coast Roosters NSWRL Women's Premiership team. On 27 September, they defeated the North Sydney Bears 16–10 in the Grand Final.

On 20 October, she started at lock in the Roosters' 10–20 Grand Final loss to the Brisbane Broncos. After the game, she was named the RLPA Players' Champion.

=== 2022 ===
Southwell was a member of the Sydney Roosters team that won the premiership in the postponed 2021 NRL Women's season, playing in all seven matches including the Grand Final victory on 10 April 2022.

In late May, Southwell was named in the 22-player extended squad for the New South Wales women's rugby league team, ahead of the women's State of Origin match on 24 June, 2022.

She played in the Roosters' 2021 Grand Final win over the St. George Illawarra Dragons.

On 1 June, the Newcastle Knights announced that local junior Southwell had signed to play for the club in the 2022 season, alongside younger sister Jesse. She made her club debut for the Knights in round 1 of the 2022 NRLW season against the Brisbane Broncos.

=== 2023 ===
In April, Southwell re-signed with the Knights on a contract until the end of 2027. She was captain for the Knights as they went back-to-back NRLW Premiers

=== 2025 ===
Southwell was granted an early release from her contract with the Newcastle Knights to return to the St George Illawarra Dragons on a two year deal.
