= Most Outstanding Player =

The term Most Outstanding Player may refer to:

- The recipient of the CFL's Most Outstanding Player Award
- The NCAA basketball tournament Most Outstanding Player award
- The College World Series Most Outstanding Player in college baseball
- The NCAA Division I Ice Hockey Tournament Most Outstanding Player in college ice hockey
- The WCHA Most Outstanding Player in Tournament in college ice hockey
