= Simone Karpani =

Samoa international rugby league footballer (born 1997)

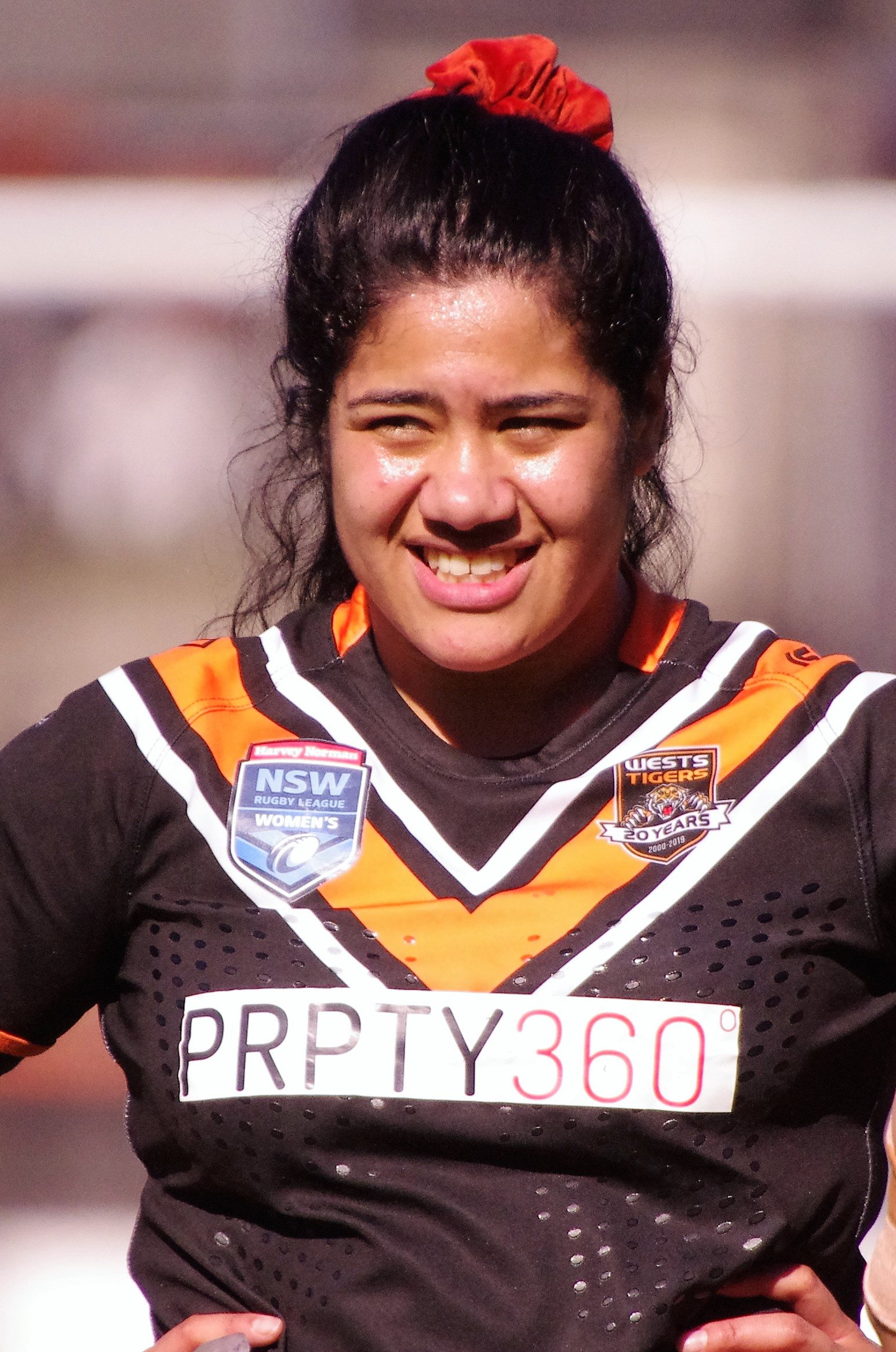
- Karpani in 2019

Personal information
- Born: 16 June 1997 (age 29) Logan, Queensland, Australia
- Height: 165 cm (5 ft 5 in)
- Weight: 74 kg (11 st 9 lb)

Playing information
- Position: Lock
Club
Years	Team	Pld	T	G	FG	P
2021	Sydney Roosters	7	0	0	0	0
2022–	Newcastle Knights	35	2	0	0	8
	Total	42	2	0	0	8
Representative
Years	Team	Pld	T	G	FG	P
2024–25	Samoa	3	0	0	0	0
- Source: As of 1 November 2026
- Relatives: Asoiva Karpani (sister)

Simone Karpani (born 16 June 1997) is an Australian professional rugby league footballer who currently plays for the Newcastle Knights in the NRL Women's Premiership. Her position is lock. She previously played for the Sydney Roosters.

== Background ==
Born in Logan, Queensland, Karpani played her junior rugby league in Adelaide, South Australia.

She is the sister of Australian Wallaroos rugby union representative Asoiva Karpani.

== Playing career ==
=== Early years ===
In 2017, Karpani represented the Women's All Stars side against the Indigenous Women's All Stars. Soon after, she played for the Cronulla Sharks in the Cronulla Sharks Women's Series. In 2019, she joined the Wests Tigers in the NSWRL Women's Premiership. In 2021, she joined the Central Coast Roosters.

=== 2022 ===
Karpani joined the Sydney Roosters NRLW squad in 2022. In round 1 of the delayed 2021 NRL Women's season, she made her NRLW debut for the Roosters against the Brisbane Broncos. She played in the Roosters' 2021 Grand Final win over the St. George Illawarra Dragons.

In June, she signed with the Newcastle Knights for the 2022 season. She made her club debut for the Knights in round 1 of the 2022 NRLW season against the Brisbane Broncos.

On 2 October, Karpani played in the Knights' 2022 NRLW Grand Final win over the Parramatta Eels.
