= Caitlan Johnston-Green =

Australian rugby league player (born 2001)

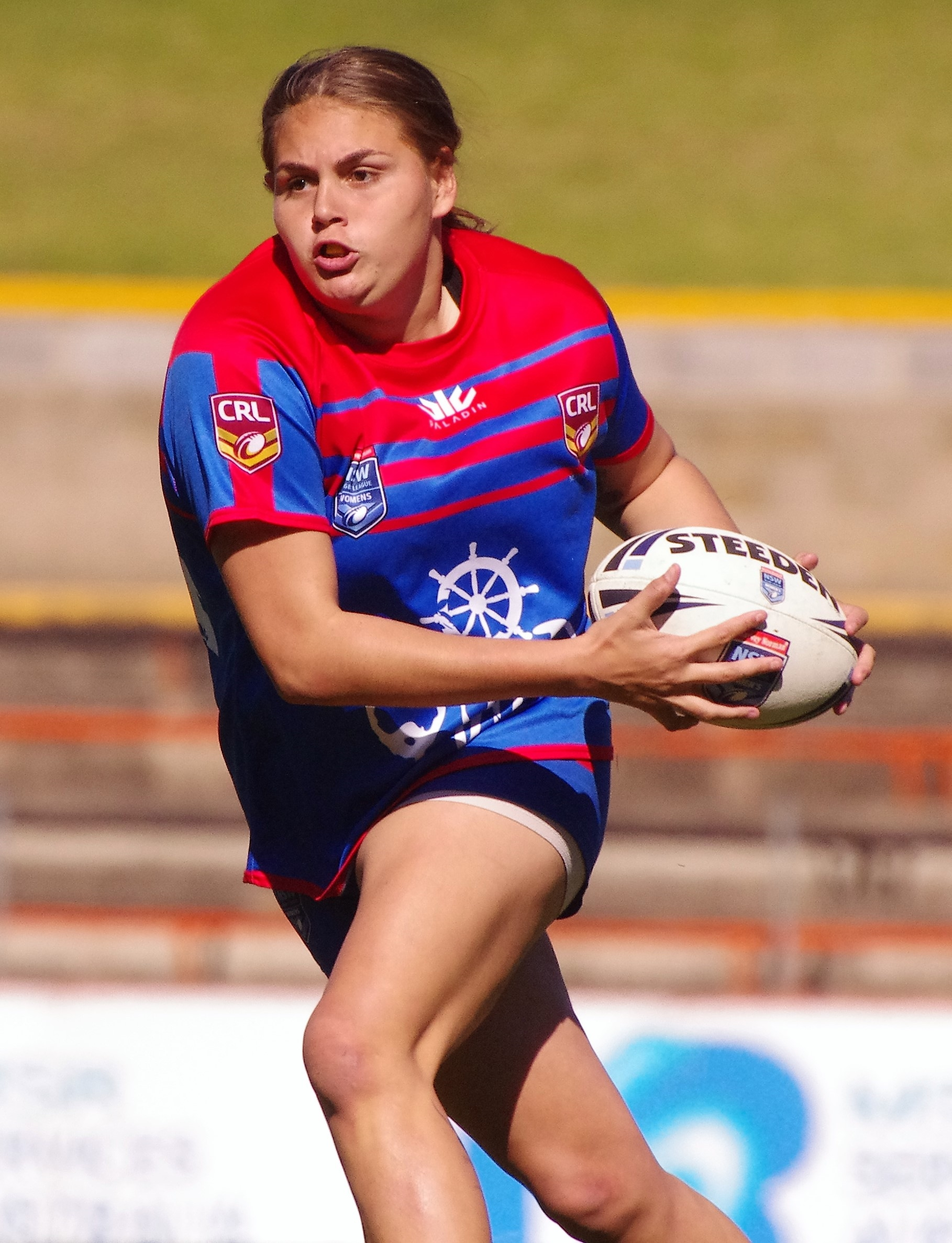
- Johnston-Green in 2019

Personal information
- Born: 12 January 2001 (age 25) Belmont, New South Wales, Australia
- Height: 173 cm (5 ft 8 in)
- Weight: 88 kg (13 st 12 lb)

Playing information
- Position: Second-row, Prop, Lock
Club
| Years | Team | Pld | T | G | FG | P |
|---|---|---|---|---|---|---|
| 2019 | Sydney Roosters | 3 | 0 | 0 | 0 | 0 |
| 2021–24 | Newcastle Knights | 20 | 4 | 0 | 0 | 16 |
| 2025– | Cronulla Sharks | 14 | 1 | 0 | 0 | 4 |
| | Total | 37 | 5 | 0 | 0 | 20 |
Representative
| Years | Team | Pld | T | G | FG | P |
| 2019–22 | Indigenous All Stars | 4 | 0 | 0 | 0 | 0 |
| 2019 | Prime Minister's XIII | 1 | 0 | 0 | 0 | 0 |
| 2022 | Australia | 2 | 1 | 0 | 0 | 4 |
| 2022–24 | New South Wales | 3 | 1 | 0 | 0 | 4 |
- Source: As of 22 November 2026

Caitlan Johnston-Green (born 12 January 2001) is an Australian rugby league footballer who currently plays for the Cronulla-Sutherland Sharks in the NRL Women's Premiership. Her position is prop.

She previously played for the Sydney Roosters and Newcastle Knights, while also representing the Indigenous All Stars, Prime Minister's XIII, Australia and New South Wales.

== Background ==
Born in Belmont, New South Wales, Johnston-Green is of Indigenous Australian descent and began playing rugby league for Windale at age 11.

== Playing career ==
In 2018 and 2019, Johnston-Green played for the Newcastle Knights in the Tarsha Gale Cup, captaining the side in 2019.

On 15 February 2019, she started at second-row for the Indigenous All Stars in their 4–8 loss to the Maori All Stars.

On 21 June 2019, she started at second-row for New South Wales under-18 in their 24–4 win over Queensland in the first ever Women's under-18 Origin game. She scored a try and was named Player of the Match. In July 2019, Johnston-Green joined the Sydney Roosters NRL Women's Premiership team.

In Round 1 of the 2019 NRL Women's season, she made her debut for the Roosters in their 12–16 loss to the New Zealand Warriors. On 11 October 2019, she started at lock for the Prime Minister's XIII in their 22–14 win over the Fiji Prime Minister's XIII. On 25 October 2019, she was named 18th player for Australia for their Test match against New Zealand.

On 22 February 2020, she started at prop for the Indigenous All Stars in their 10–4 win over the Maori All Stars. In March 2020, Johnston-Green joined the Central Coast Roosters NSWRL Women's Premiership team. Johnston-Green suffered a knee injury while playing for the Central Coast and was ruled out of the 2020 NRL Women's season.

On 20 February 2021, she represented the Indigenous All Stars in their 24–0 loss to the Māori All Stars.

On 1 July 2021, Johnston-Green was announced as the Newcastle Knights' first ever NRLW signing. In February 2022, she was announced as one of the club captains.

In round 1 of the delayed 2021 NRL Women's season, Johnston-Green made her club debut for the Knights against the Parramatta Eels.

In late September 2022, Johnston-Green was named in the Dream Team announced by the Rugby League Players Association. The team was selected by the players, who each cast one vote for each position.

On 2 October 2022, Johnston-Green played in the Knights' 32-12 NRLW Grand Final win over the Parramatta Eels.

In 2023, Johnston-Green played at prop in the Knights' 24-18 Grand Final win over the Gold Coast Titans.

In May 2024, Johnston-Green signed a 3-year contract with the Cronulla-Sutherland Sharks, starting in 2025.
