= Shanice Parker =

Australian rugby footballer

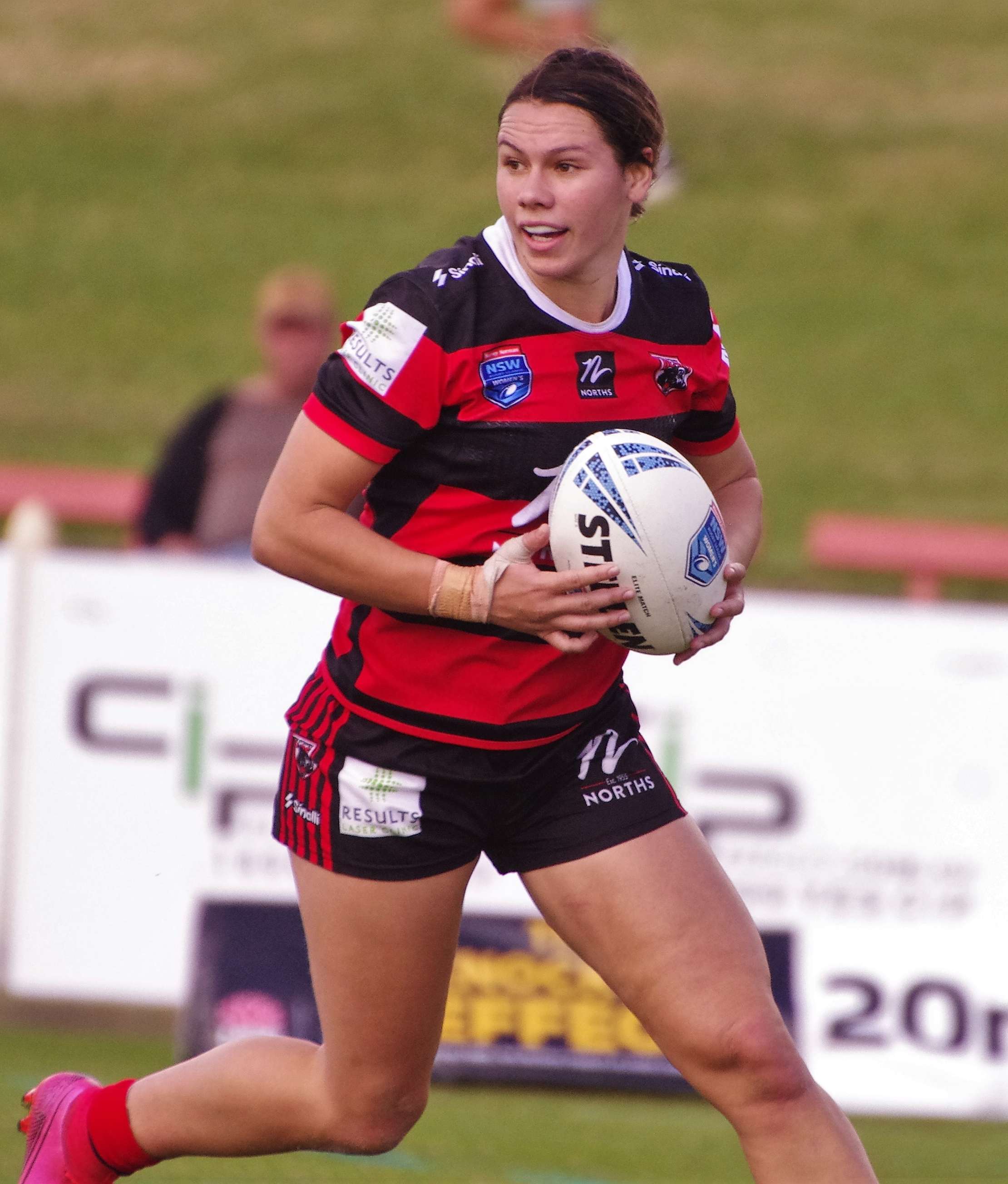
- Parker in 2021

Personal information
- Born: 16 May 1998 (age 28) Yangebup, Western Australia, Australia
- Height: 164 cm (5 ft 5 in)
- Weight: 68 kg (10 st 10 lb)

Playing information

Rugby union
- Position: Wing
Club
Years	Team	Pld	T	G	FG	P
2018–20	NSW Waratahs	13	13	0	0	65
Representative
Years	Team	Pld	T	G	FG	P
2019	Australia

Rugby league
- Position: Wing, Centre, Fullback
Club
Years	Team	Pld	T	G	FG	P
2019–20	Sydney Roosters	5	0	0	0	0
2022–	Newcastle Knights	41	11	0	0	44
	Total	46	11	0	0	44
Representative
Years	Team	Pld	T	G	FG	P
2020	New South Wales	1	0	0	0	0
2021	Māori All Stars	1	1	0	0	4
2022–	New Zealand	10	2	0	0	8
- Source: As of 8 October 2026

Shanice Parker (born 16 May 1998) is an Australian-New Zealand professional rugby league footballer who currently plays for the Newcastle Knights in the NRL Women's Premiership.

Primarily a winger or centre, she has represented Australia in rugby union and New Zealand in rugby league. She previously played for the Sydney Roosters in the NRLW and North Sydney Bears in the NSWRL Women's Premiership.

== Background ==
Born in Yangebup, Western Australia, Parker grew up playing rugby league for the Willagee Bears. She stopped playing league when she was 12 and began playing rugby union when she was 15. Her mother, Danielle, represented Australia at the 2000 Women's Rugby League World Cup.

== Playing career ==
=== Rugby union ===
In 2015, Parker represented Australia at the 2015 Commonwealth Youth Games. In 2016, she was contracted to the Australian sevens team.

In 2018, she moved to Sydney and joined the NSW Waratahs Super W team, winning Grand Finals with the team in 2018 and 2019. In 2019, she made her international debut for Australia.

=== Rugby league ===
In 2018, Parker returned to rugby league, joining the North Sydney Bears NSWRL Women's Premiership team.

In May 2019, she represented NSW City at the Women's National Championships. In June 2019, she joined the Sydney Roosters NRL Women's Premiership team. In Round 3 of the 2019 NRL Women's season, she made her debut for the Roosters in their 16–24 loss to the St George Illawarra Dragons.

On 25 October 2020, Parker started on the wing in the Roosters' 10–20 Grand Final loss to the Brisbane Broncos.

On 20 February 2021, she represented the Māori All Stars, scoring a try in their 24–0 win over the Indigenous All Stars.

In June 2022, Parker signed with the Newcastle Knights for the 2022 season. She made her club debut for the Knights in round 1 of the 2022 NRLW season against the Brisbane Broncos.

On 2 October 2022, Parker played in the Knights' 32-12 NRLW Grand Final win over the Parramatta Eels.

In October 2022, she was selected for the New Zealand squad at the delayed 2021 Women's Rugby League World Cup in England.
