= Tiana Davison =

New Zealand international rugby league player

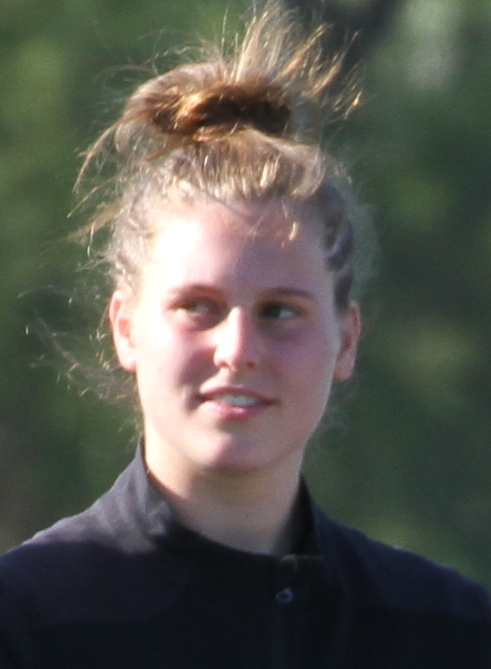
- Davison playing rugby union in 2018

Personal information
- Born: 26 October 2000 (age 26) New Plymouth, Taranaki, New Zealand
- Height: 174 cm (5 ft 9 in)
- Weight: 79 kg (12 st 6 lb)

Playing information
- Position: Second-row, Prop, Lock
Club
Years	Team	Pld	T	G	FG	P
2022–23	Newcastle Knights	8	1	0	0	4
2024	Sydney Roosters	8	1	0	0	4
2025–	Newcastle Knights	24	4	0	0	12
	Total	40	6	0	0	20
Representative
Years	Team	Pld	T	G	FG	P
2023–	New Zealand	5	0	0	0	0
- Source: As of 14 November 2026

Tiana Davison (born 26 October 2000) is a New Zealand professional rugby league footballer who currently plays for the Newcastle Knights in the NRL Women's Premiership. Her position is second-row. She previously played for the Sydney Roosters.

== Background ==
Born in New Plymouth, Taranaki, New Zealand, Davison played rugby union for the Clifton Rugby Club growing up.

== Playing career ==
=== Early years ===
In 2017, Davison was selected in the New Zealand under-17 and under-18 girl's rugby sevens wider training group, to prepare for a development camp in Auckland. By 2018, she was playing for the senior Clifton Rugby Club women's team and was a part of the winning New Zealand side at the Oceania under-18s Sevens Championship. In 2019, she played for the Manawatu Rugby Union club in the Farah Palmer Cup, before joining the Taranaki Whio in 2020. In November 2020, she was selected in the Red Bull Ignite7 sevens squad.

=== 2022 ===
In 2022, Davison returned to the Clifton Rugby Club side in the Taranaki women's competition. In June, she signed with the Newcastle Knights in the NRL Women's Premiership for the 2022 season, making the switch to rugby league, despite never having played a game in the sport before. In round 3 of the 2022 NRLW season, she made her NRLW debut for the Knights against the Parramatta Eels.

=== 2023 ===
In 2023, Davison was a Premiership winner with the Newcastle Knights. On 15 December, Davison signed a one-year deal to play for the Sydney Roosters in the 2024 season.

=== 2024 ===
After playing 8 games for the Roosters, Davison signed a 3-year contract to return to the Newcastle Knights, starting in 2025.

== Personal life ==
Davison is the daughter of Justin and Brenda, and she has a younger brother, Carlin, and a younger sister, Maddison. Carlin is a professional basketball player.
