= Kayla Romaniuk =

Australian rugby league player

Personal information
- Born: 22 February 2002 (age 24) Kurri Kurri, New South Wales, Australia
- Height: 163 cm (5 ft 4 in)
- Weight: 82 kg (12 st 13 lb)

Playing information
- Position: Lock, Prop
Club
Years	Team	Pld	T	G	FG	P
2022–	Newcastle Knights	48	6	0	0	24
Representative
Years	Team	Pld	T	G	FG	P
2025	Prime Minister's XIII	1	0	0	0	0
- Source: As of 1 November 2026

Kayla Romaniuk (born 22 February 2002) is an Australian professional rugby league footballer who currently plays for the Newcastle Knights in the NRL Women's Premiership. Her positions are lock and prop.

== Background ==
Born in Kurri Kurri, New South Wales, Romaniuk played her junior rugby league for the Kurri Kurri Bulldogs. She also played basketball for the Maitland Mustangs growing up and represented the Country Women's side.

== Playing career ==
=== Early years ===
In 2019, Romaniuk joined the Newcastle Knights, playing for their Tarsha Gale Cup side. On 25 November 2021, she signed a development contract with the Knights' NRL Women's Premiership side.

=== 2022 ===
In 2022, Romaniuk spent most of the year playing with the Knights' NSWRL Women's Premiership side. She was named in the extended squad for the Knights' round 5 2022 NRLW season clash with the St. George Illawarra Dragons, after having her contract upgraded to the top 24 squad. She subsequently made her NRLW debut for the Knights against the Dragons, playing at lock in the Knights' 30–8 win.

On 2 October, Romaniuk played in the Knights' 2022 NRLW Grand Final win over the Parramatta Eels.
