= Olivia Higgins =

Australia international rugby league footballer (born 1992)

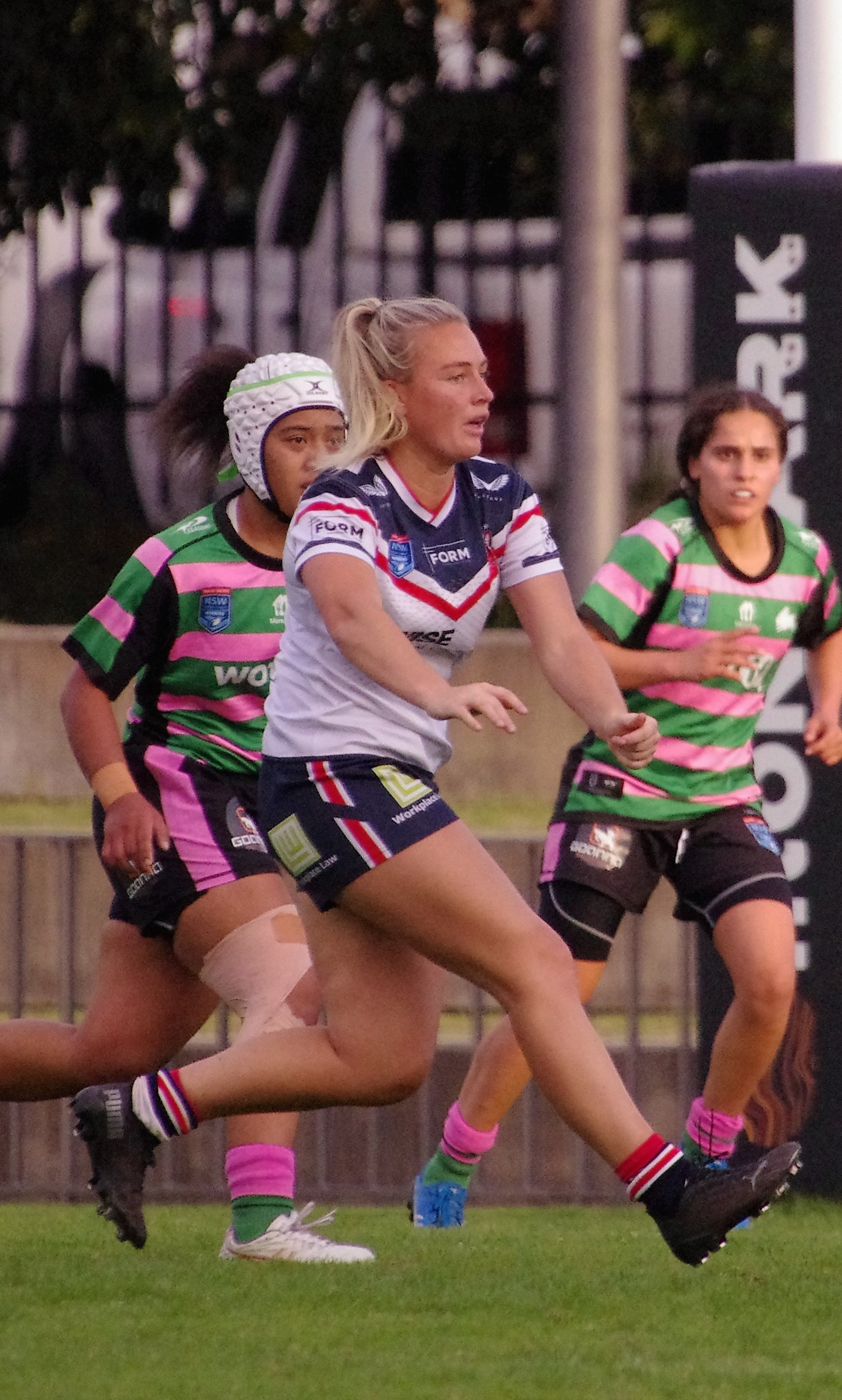
- Higgins (centre) passing the ball

Personal information
- Born: 15 September 1992 (age 34) Newcastle, New South Wales, Australia
- Height: 169 cm (5 ft 7 in)
- Weight: 72 kg (11 st 5 lb)

Playing information
- Position: Hooker
Club
Years	Team	Pld	T	G	FG	P
2021	Sydney Roosters	7	1	0	0	4
2022–	Newcastle Knights	40	13	0	0	52
	Total	47	14	0	0	56
Representative
Years	Team	Pld	T	G	FG	P
2024–26	New South Wales	6	0	0	0	0
2024–26	Australia	9	1	0	0	4
- Source: As of 16 November 2026

Olivia Higgins (born 15 September 1992) is an Australian professional rugby league footballer who plays as a hooker for the Newcastle Knights in the NRL Women's Premiership.

== Background ==
Born in Newcastle, New South Wales, Higgins started out playing league tag. She is currently a high school teacher in Newcastle.

== Playing career ==
=== Early years ===
In 2019, Higgins played for the Aberglasslyn Ants and represented the CRL Newcastle side. In 2020, she joined the Central Coast Roosters in the NSWRL Women's Premiership.

=== 2022 ===
Higgins joined the Sydney Roosters NRLW squad in 2022. In round 1 of the delayed 2021 NRL Women's season, she made her NRLW debut for the Roosters against the Brisbane Broncos. She played in the Roosters' 2021 Grand Final win over the St. George Illawarra Dragons and scored a try.

In June, she signed with the Newcastle Knights for the 2022 season. She made her club debut for the Knights in round 1 of the 2022 NRLW season against the Brisbane Broncos.

On 2 October, Higgins played in the Knights' 2022 NRLW Grand Final win over the Parramatta Eels.

== Achievements and accolades ==
=== Representative ===
- Rugby League World Cup Champion: 2026
