= Tayla Predebon =

Australian rugby league footballer (born 2000)

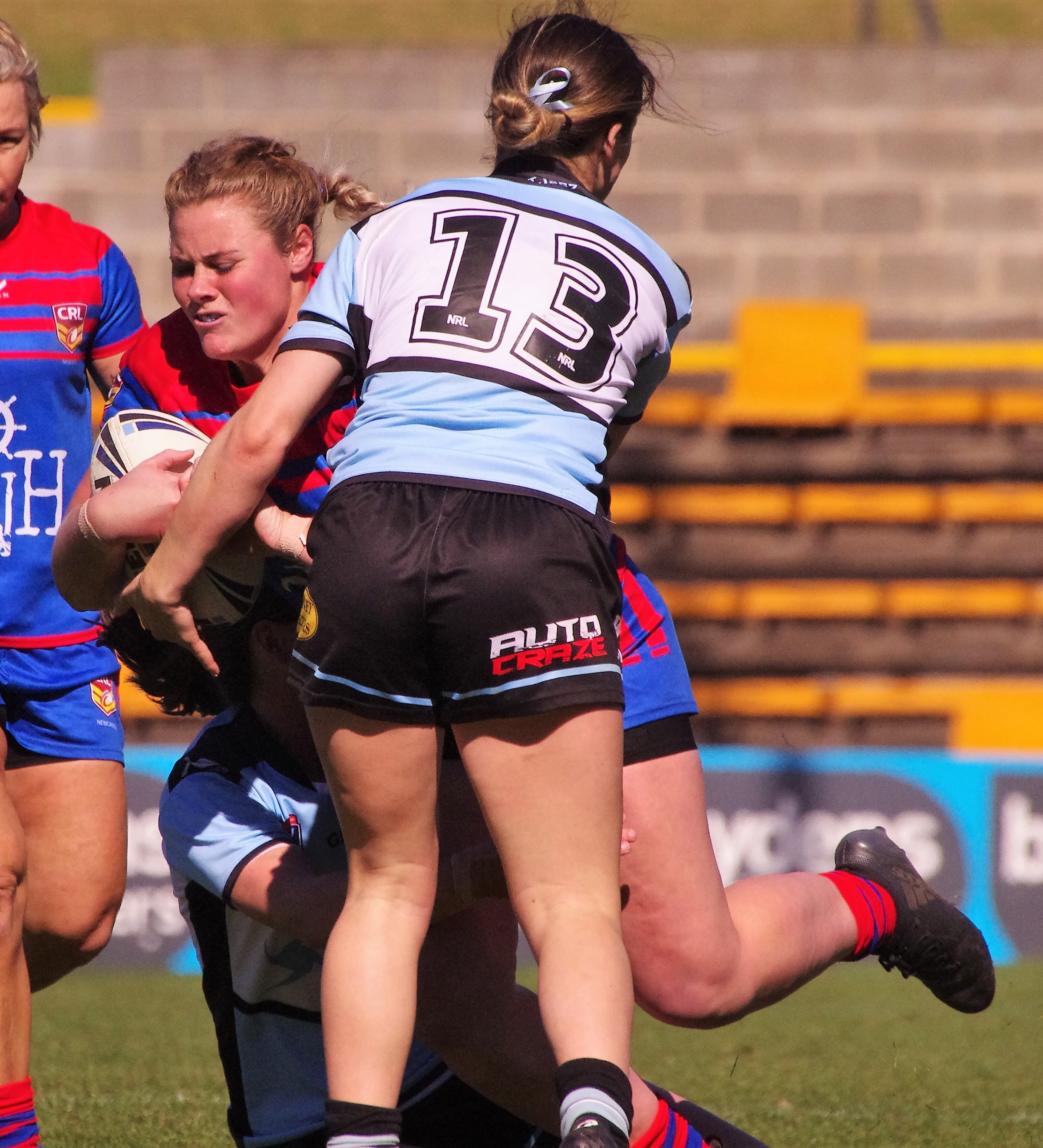
- Predebon running with the ball

Personal information
- Born: 20 November 2000 (age 26) Gloucester, New South Wales, Australia
- Height: 174 cm (5 ft 9 in)
- Weight: 100 kg (15 st 10 lb)

Playing information
- Position: Prop
Club
Years	Team	Pld	T	G	FG	P
2021	Sydney Roosters	7	0	0	0	0
2022–	Newcastle Knights	39	7	0	0	28
	Total	46	7	0	0	28
- Source: As of 22 November 2026

Tayla Predebon (born 20 November 2000) is an Australian professional rugby league footballer who currently plays for the Newcastle Knights in the NRL Women's Premiership. Her position is prop. She previously played for the Sydney Roosters.

== Background ==
Born in Gloucester, New South Wales, Predebon grew up playing netball and rugby league.

== Playing career ==
=== Early years ===
In 2018 and 2019, Predebon represented the CRL Newcastle side. In 2020, she joined the Central Coast Roosters in the NSWRL Women's Premiership.

=== 2022 ===
Predebon joined the Sydney Roosters NRLW squad in 2022. In round 1 of the delayed 2021 NRL Women's season, she made her NRLW debut for the Roosters against the Brisbane Broncos. She played in the Roosters' 2021 Grand Final win over the St. George Illawarra Dragons.

In June, she signed with the Newcastle Knights for the 2022 season. She made her club debut for the Knights in round 1 of the 2022 NRLW season against the Brisbane Broncos, scoring a try in the Knights' 32-14 win.

On 2 October, Predebon played in the Knights' 2022 NRLW Grand Final win over the Parramatta Eels.
