= Jesse Southwell =

Australia international rugby player

Personal information
- Born: 12 February 2005 (age 21) Newcastle, New South Wales, Australia
- Height: 163 cm (5 ft 4 in)
- Weight: 77 kg (12 st 2 lb)

Playing information
- Position: Halfback, Five-eighth
Club
Years	Team	Pld	T	G	FG	P
2022–25	Newcastle Knights	40	7	102	0	232
2026–	Brisbane Broncos	14	2	56	0	120
	Total	54	9	158	0	352
Representative
Years	Team	Pld	T	G	FG	P
2023–26	New South Wales	8	0	16	1	33
2024	Prime Minister's XIII	1	0	1	0	2
2025–	Australia	5	0	40	0	80
- Source: As of 16 November 2026

Rugby union career
National sevens team
Years	Team	Comps
2022	Australia 7s	
- Relatives: Hannah Southwell (sister)
Medal record
Women's rugby sevens
Representing Australia
Commonwealth Games
Gold medal – first place	2022 Birmingham	Team competition

Jesse Southwell (born 12 February 2005) is an Australian rugby league and rugby sevens footballer who currently plays for the Brisbane Broncos in the NRL Women's Premiership. Her positions are halfback and five-eighth. Southwell previously played with the Newcastle Knights where she won two NRL Women's Premierships

== Background ==
Southwell was born in Newcastle, New South Wales. She played her junior rugby league for the Kotara Bears.

She had played rugby league since she was a 5-year-old child and only played rugby sevens for the first time at high school. She also played touch football growing up. Southwell said she was inspired by the Australian gold medal-winning rugby sevens team at the 2016 Olympic Games.

She is the younger sister of Knights player Hannah Southwell.

== Playing career ==
=== Early years ===
In 2020, Southwell made history by becoming the first female player to sign a contract with the Newcastle Knights. In November 2021, she was announced as a development player for the Knights' NRL Women's Premiership side.

=== 2022 ===
Southwell played for the Knights' Tarsha Gale Cup side in 2022. She was selected for the Australian sevens squad in April following her stand out performances in the AON University Sevens Series for the Newcastle University in New South Wales. In May, she played a match for the Knights' NSWRL Women's Premiership side.

She won a gold medal with the Australian sevens team at the 2022 Commonwealth Games in Birmingham.

In August, she officially joined the Knights' NRLW top 24-squad after gaining an exemption from the NRL due to being underage. In round 1 of the 2022 NRLW season, she made her NRLW debut for the Knights against the Brisbane Broncos, scoring a try in the Knights' 32–14 win.

On 2 October, Southwell played in the Knights' 2022 NRLW Grand Final win over the Parramatta Eels, scoring a try and kicking a goal in the Knights' 32–12 victory.

=== 2023 ===
In April, Southwell re-signed with the Knights on a contract until the end of 2027.

Southwell made her State of Origin debut for New South Wales in Game 1 of the 2023 Women's State of Origin at Parramatta's CommBank Stadium.

Her try against the Sydney Roosters was voted the NRLW try of the year.

Southwell was a part of the Knights team that won back-to-back premierships, as the Knights defeated the Titans 24–18 in the 2023 Grand Final. It was the first time that she won the premiership alongside older sister, Hannah.

=== 2025 ===
Southwell was recalled to the NSW team for State of Origin and played a starring role in all three games in the 2–1 series victory.

On October 6, 2025, Southwell was selected for the Australian Jillaroos squad for the 2025 Pacific Championships. Just a week later, Southwell signed a two-year deal with 2025 NRLW Premiers, the Brisbane Broncos.

== Achievements and accolades ==
=== Representative ===
- Rugby League World Cup Champion: 2026
