= 2021 Women's Rugby League World Cup squads =

This article lists the official squads for the 2021 Women's Rugby League World Cup which, postponed due to the COVID-19 pandemic is being held in November 2022.

== Pool A ==
=== Brazil ===
Head coach: (Australia) Paul Grundy
Captains: Maria Graf, Giovanna Moura.
Summary: 3 matches, 3 losses. 5 tries by 4 try-scorers, 2 goals. 24 points scored.

#	Player	Games	Tries	Goals	Points	Club
18	Natalia Momberg	3	1	0	4	Vitoria Rhinos
22	Edna Santini	3	1	0	4	Vitoria Rhinos
3	Leticia Medeiros	3	0	0	0	Melina
12	Amanda Welter	3	0	0	0	Maringa Hawks
4	Daniele Soares	1	0	0	0	Maringa Hawks
6	Giovanna Moura	3	0	0	0	Maringa Hawks
7	Maria Graf	2	0	2	4	Urutau
8	Franciny Amaral	3	1	0	4	Melina
9	Patricia Bodeman	3	1	0	4	Melina
10	Paula Casemiro	3	0	0	0	Vitoria Rhinos
11	Patricia Oliveira	3	0	0	0	Melina
17	Ana Loschi de Quadros	3	0	0	0	Vitoria Rhinos
16	Brena Prioste	3	0	0	0	Urutau
2	Tatiane Fernandes	2	0	0	0	Vitoria Rhinos
13	Bárbara Leal	2	0	0	0	Vitoria Rhinos
15	Franciele Barros	3	0	0	0	Melina
23	Natalia Jonck	1	0	0	0	Melina
20	Pāmella Nascimento Silva	1	0	0	0	Melina
1	Adriana Felix	2	0	0	0	Vitoria Rhinos
5	Byanca Santa Rita	1	0	0	0	Melina
14	Giovanna Barth	2	0	0	0	Maringa Hawks
21	Ellen Trindade	1	0	0	0	Melina
6	Suzana Rodrigues	0	0	0	0	Vitoria Rhinos

Notes:

- The squad was announced on 10 October 2022.
- All players in the squad participated in the warm-up match against France on 27 October 2022, with Franciny Amaral scoring a try.

=== Canada ===
Head coach: (England) Mike Castle
Captain: Gabrielle Hindley
Summary: 3 matches, 1 win, 2 losses. 7 tries by 5 try-scorers. 5 goals. 38 points scored.

#	Player	Games	Tries	Goals	Points	Club
15	Nina Bui	1	0	0	0	
20	Lauren Mueller	3	0	0	0	
10	Laura Mariu	3	0	0	0	
7	Sabrina McDaid	3	0	0	0	
22	Ada Okonkwo	3	0	0	0	
6	Alanna Fittes	2	1	0	4	
24	Elizabeth Steele	3	0	0	0	
11	Gabrielle Hindley	3	0	0	0	
14	Maddy Aberg	3	0	0	0	
13	Megan Pakulis	3	2	0	8	
21	Natasha Naismith	1	0	0	0	
8	Kristy Sargent	3	0	0	0	
12	Sarah Maguire	2	1	0	4	
19	Jade Menin	2	0	0	0	
16	Rachel Choboter	1	0	0	0	
5	Karina Gauto	2	0	0	0	
2	Brittany Jones	1	0	0	0	
9	Natalie Tam	2	0	0	0	
17	Brittany Douglas	1	0	0	0	
18	Alix Evans	1	0	0	0	
23	Zoey Siciliano	1	0	0	0	

Notes:

- The Ravens' World Cup squad was announced in early September.
- Support Staff for the tournament are
  - Assistant Coaches: Ben Hickey, Stevi Schnoor, Darryl Fisher.
  - Team Manager: Katie Grudzinski
- Laura Mariu played for New Zealand Kiwi Ferns from 2000 to 2018 including all five previous World Cups. Mariu qualifies to play for Canada through her mother.

=== England ===
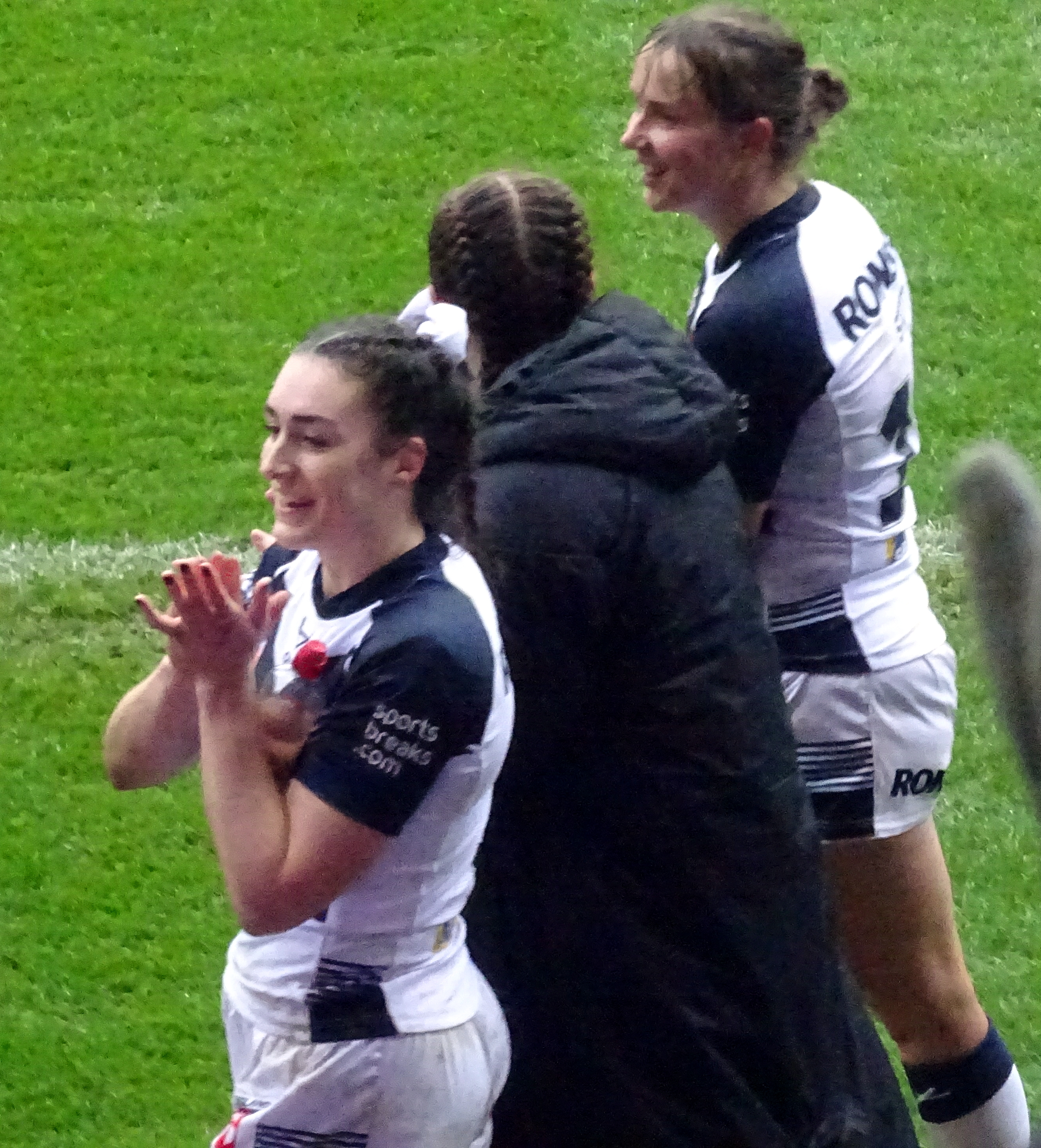
England women's rugby league players taking a lap of honour at 2021 WRLWC

Head coach: (England) Craig Richards
Captain: Emily Rudge
Summary: 4 matches, 3 wins, 1 loss. 34 tries by 14 try-scorers. 19 goals. 174 points scored.

#	Player	Games	Tries	Goals	Points	Club
3	Fran Goldthorp	4	3	0	2	Leeds Rhinos
2	Caitlin Beevers	3	2	0	8	Leeds Rhinos
1	Tara-Jane Stanley	4	6	9	2	York Valkyrie
4	Amy Hardcastle	3	5	0	0	St Helens
5	Leah Burke	4	6	0	4	St Helens
6	Georgia Roche	4	1	0	4	Leeds Rhinos
7	Courtney Winfield-Hill	4	3	0	2	Leeds Rhinos
17	Shona Hoyle	4	0	0	0	St Helens
9	Tara Jones	3	1	0	4	St Helens
18	Olivia Wood	3	1	0	4	York Valkyrie
14	Vicky Molyneux	3	0	0	0	Wigan Warriors
12	Emily Rudge	4	0	0	0	St Helens
13	Jodie Cunningham	3	0	0	0	St Helens
21	Keara Bennett	3	0	0	0	Leeds Rhinos
11	Hollie Dodd	4	2	0	8	York Valkyrie
8	Grace Field	3	1	0	4	York Valkyrie
15	Vicky Whitfield	4	1	0	4	St Helens
19	Paige Travis	2	0	0	0	St Helens
22	Zoe Harris	1	0	0	0	St Helens
23	Carrie Roberts	1	1	0	4	St Helens
20	Georgia Wilson	1	1	0	4	Wigan Warriors
10	Dannielle Anderson	1	0	0	0	Leeds Rhinos
16	Beth Stott	1	0	0	0	St Helens
24	Zoe Hornby	1	0	0	0	Leeds Rhinos

Notes:

- The England squad was announced on 26 September.
- Squad numbers for the tournament were announced on 18 October 2022.

=== Papua New Guinea ===
Head coach: (Australia) Ben Jeffries
Captain: Elsie Albert
Summary: 4 matches, 2 wins, 2 losses. 22 tries by 13 try-scorers. 10 goals by 2 goal-kickers. 108 points scored.

#	Player	Games	Tries	Goals	Points	Club
5	Shae-Yvonne De La Cruz	3	0	0	0	Souths Logan
2	Anika Butler	4	2	0	8	Newcastle Knights
4	Shellie Long	3	1	0	4	Brisbane Tigers
3	Belinda Gwasamun	4	5	0	0	Highlands Confederate
17	Martha Molowia	4	4	0	6	Southern Confederate
6	Sera Koroi	4	1	0	4	Souths Logan
7	Lila Malabag	4	1	8	0	Southern Confederate
8	Elsie Albert	4	1	0	4	St George Illawarra
9	Therese Aiton	3	1	0	4	South Sydney
10	Gloria Kaupa	4	0	0	0	Highlands Confederate
15	Bertshiba Awoi	3	0	0	0	Southern Confederate
12	Essay Banu	4	1	0	4	Wynnum Manly
13	Jessikah Reeves	4	1	0	4	Souths Logan
19	Talitha Kunjil	2	0	0	0	Highlands Confederate
11	Emily Veivers	3	0	2	4	Brisbane Tigers
16	Michelle John Ikupu	3	0	0	0	Northern Confederate
21	Carol Humeu	3	0	0	0	Southern Confederate
22	Shirley Joe	2	1	0	4	Highlands Confederate
1	Tara Moxon	1	2	0	8	Leeds Rhinos
23	Lisa-Marie Alu	2	0	0	0	Highlands Confederate
14	Ua Ravu	3	1	0	4	Riverina
18	Veronica Waula	1	0	0	0	Southern Confederate
20	Roswita Kapo	0	0	0	0	Southern Confederate
24	Joanne Lagona	0	0	0	0	Southern Confederate

Notes:

- A squad of 24 players participated in the World Cup.
- Squad numbers were announced in late October.
- Support staff includes Meg Ward as an assistant coach.
- Elizabeth Kapa (PNG Southern Confederate) was selected in the squad but was ruled out due to an injury. Ua Ravu was brought into the squad.
- The Orchids announced via social media on 26 October that Tara Moxon had been added to the squad.

== Pool B ==
=== Australia ===
Head coach: (Australia) Brad Donald
Captains: Kezie Apps, Sam Bremner, Ali Brigginshaw. Tallisha Harden.
Summary: 5 matches, 5 wins. 58 tries by 16 try-scorers. 40 goals by 4 goal-kickers. 312 points scored.
Table last updated 20 November 2022. Players' ages are as at that date. Players in the table ordered for their playing positions for the Final match against New Zealand on 19 November.

#	Player	Games	Tries	Goals	Points	Club
2	Samantha Bremner	4	4	0	6	Roosters
10	Julia Robinson	4	7	0	8	Broncos
11	Jessica Sergis	4	7	0	8	Roosters
5	Isabelle Kelly	4	5	0	0	Roosters
24	Evania Pelite	4	7	0	8	Titans
12	Tarryn Aiken	4	5	1	2	Broncos
3	Ali Brigginshaw	4	0	5	0	Broncos
8	Keeley Davis	3	1	0	4	Dragons
23	Shannon Mato	3	0	0	0	Titans
16	Kennedy Cherrington	4	2	0	8	Eels
18	Yasmin Clydsdale	5	0	0	0	Knights
1	Kezie Apps	3	0	0	0	Dragons
4	Simaima Taufa	3	0	0	0	Eels
14	Lauren Brown	5	0	0	0	Titans
6	Emma Tonegato	4	5	0	0	Dragons
13	Shaylee Bent	4	1	0	4	Dragons
20	Caitlan Johnston	3	1	0	4	Knights
9	Holli Wheeler	3	0	4	8	Dragons
15	Jaime Chapman	3	4	0	6	Broncos
17	Shenae Ciesiolka	3	4	0	6	Broncos
19	Taliah Fuimaono	3	1	0	4	Dragons
7	Tallisha Harden	2	2	0	8	Broncos
22	Olivia Kernick	4	2	0	8	Roosters
21	Keilee Joseph	2	0	0	0	Roosters

Notes:

- The squad was announced on 3 October 2022 (after the Grand Final of the 2022 NRLW season) and updated on 4 October following the withdrawal and replacement of two players.
- Original selections Millie Boyle (work commitments) and Tamika Upton (calf injury) withdrew on 4 October and were replaced by Shaylee Bent and Emma Tonegato.
- Squad numbers were announced in late October.
- Taliah Fuimaono played her one international match for Samoa in 2019.
- Assistant coaches are Neil Henry, Jess Skinner and Kate Mullaly.

=== Cook Islands ===
Head coach: (New Zealand) Rusty Matua
Captains: Kimiora Breayley-Nati, Elianna Walton.
Summary: 3 matches, 1 win, 2 losses. 12 tries by 9 try-scorers. 3 goals. 54 points scored.

#	Player	Games	Tries	Goals	Points	Club
16	Alekermay Tuaana	3	1	0	4	Souths Union
1	Mackenzie Wiki	3	2	0	8	Manurewa Marlins
14	Jazmon Tupou-Witchman	3	0	0	0	Wynnum Manly
18	Charlize Tumu-Makara	3	0	0	0	Tupapa Panthers
4	Daimzel Rongokea	3	0	0	0	Arorangi Bears
3	Kerehitina Matua	3	0	3	6	Manurewa Marlins
21	Anneka Stephens	3	0	0	0	Joondalup Giants
8	Karol-Ann Tanevesi	3	0	0	0	Mounties
9	Tetuanui Dean	2	1	0	4	Campbelltown Collegians
10	April Ngatupuna	3	1	0	4	Gold Coast
11	Moniqca Mo'ale	2	0	0	0	South Sydney
17	Lavinia Kitai	3	0	0	0	Brisbane Tigers
13	Elianna Walton	2	0	0	0	Mounties
12	Kennedy Harrison-Vahua	2	0	0	0	Wynnum Manly
20	Mireka Dean	1	0	0	0	Oakey Bears
24	Erikana Dean	1	0	0	0	Oakey Bears
23	Terehia Matua	2	1	0	4	Manurewa Marlins
2	Beniamina Koiatu	1	0	0	0	Manukau Magpies
19	Tehinnah-Leal Tatuava	2	0	0	0	Titikaveka Bulldogs
6	Kimiora Breayley-Nati	2	0	0	0	Gold Coast
22	Maleyna Hunapo	1	0	0	0	Truganina Rabbitohs
5	Kiana Takairangi	1	0	0	0	Newcastle Knights
7	Chantay Kiria-Ratu	1	0	0	0	Tweed Heads
15	Toka Natua	1	0	0	0	NZ Rugby 7's

Notes:

- The Cook Islands team was announced on 6 October 2022.
- Squad numbers were announced in late October.
- Kimiora Breayley-Nati has played 6 Internationals for New Zealand from 2017 to 2018. She played Nines for New Zealand in 2017 and for the Cook Islands in 2018.
- Kiana Takairangi played 3 matches for the Cook Islands in the 2017 World Cup, and 2 matches for New Zealand in 2019. She played Nines for New Zealand in 2019.
- Elianna Walton played for Australia debuting in 2009, and participating in the 2013 and 2017 World Cups. In 2019, Walton played for Samoa.
- Mackenzie Wiki is the daughter of New Zealand Rugby League international Ruben Wiki.

=== France ===
Head coach: (France) Vincent Baloup
Captain: Alice Varela
Summary: 3 matches, 3 losses. 4 tries by 3 try-scorers. 1 goal. 18 points scored.

#	Player	Games	Tries	Goals	Points	Club
15	Chloé Guillerot	2	0	0	0	RC Lescure-Arthes XIII
2	Christina Song-Puche	2	1	0	4	Déesses Catalanes
3	Mélanie Bianchini	1	1	0	4	Déesses Catalanes
4	Laureane Biville	3	0	0	0	RC Lescure-Arthes XIII
18	Anaëlle Meunier	1	0	0	0	Bègles Bordeaux WRL
6	Elisa Ciria	3	2	1	0	RC Lescure-Arthes XIII
7	Alice Varela	3	0	0	0	Toulouse Ovalie
10	Gaelle Alvernhe	2	0	0	0	RC Lescure-Arthes XIII
14	Fanny Ramos	3	0	0	0	Déesses Catalanes
9	Cyndia Mansard	3	0	0	0	Toulouse Ovalie
1	Elisa Akpa	3	0	0	0	Déesses Catalanes
12	Perinne Monsarrat	3	0	0	0	RC Lescure-Arthes XIII
21	Dorine Samarra	3	0	0	0	RC Lescure-Arthes XIII
8	Jeanne Bernard	2	0	0	0	RC Lescure-Arthes XIII
17	Mailys Borak	3	0	0	0	Déesses Catalanes
19	Zoe Pastre-Courtine	2	0	0	0	Déesses Catalanes
5	Manon Samarra	3	0	0	0	RC Lescure-Arthes XIII
20	Anais Fourcroy	1	0	0	0	Déesses Catalanes
23	Margot Canal	2	0	0	0	Déesses Catalanes
11	Tallis Kuresa	2	0	0	0	Bègles Bordeaux WRL
16	Elodie Pacull	2	0	0	0	Déesses Catalanes
24	Lise Michel	1	0	0	0	Ayguesvives XIII
13	Leila Bessahli	1	0	0	0	Déesses Catalanes
22	Louisa Tooman	0	0	0	0	RC Lescure-Arthes XIII

Notes:

- The squad was announced in September 2022.
- Squad numbers were announced in late October.
- Sarah Menaa was included in the initial squad but was replaced by Anaëlle Meunier.

=== New Zealand ===
Head coach: (New Zealand) Ricky Henry
Captain: Krystal Rota
Summary: 5 matches, 3 wins, 2 losses. 23 tries by 14 try-scorers. 10 goals by 2 goal-kickers. 112 points scored.

#	Player	Games	Tries	Goals	Points	Club
1	Apii Nicholls	4	2	3	4	Gold Coast
3	Autumn-Rain Stephens Daly	3	1	0	4	Newcastle Knights
24	Mele Hufanga	4	3	0	2	Ponsonby Ponies
4	Page McGregor	5	1	0	4	St George Illawarra
5	Madison Bartlett	4	2	0	8	Gold Coast
15	Abigail Roache	3	0	0	0	Richmond Rovers
7	Raecene McGregor	5	3	0	2	Sydney Roosters
23	Brianna Clark	5	1	7	8	Brisbane Broncos
9	Krystal Rota	5	1	0	4	Newcastle Knights
10	Annetta Nu'uausala	5	1	0	4	Brisbane Broncos
11	Roxy Murdoch-Masila	4	2	0	8	Brisbane Broncos
12	Amber Hall	5	2	0	8	Brisbane Broncos
13	Georgia Hale	4	0	0	0	Gold Coast
14	Nita Maynard	5	0	0	0	Brisbane Broncos
8	Mya Hill-Moana	5	0	0	0	Sydney Roosters
18	Otesa Pule	5	1	0	4	Sydney Roosters
17	Christyl Stowers	3	0	0	0	Counties Manukau
16	Charlotte Arnopp-Scanlan	3	0	0	0	Newcastle Knights
2	Katelyn Vaha'akolo	3	2	0	8	Newcastle Knights
22	Karli Hansen	0	0	0	0	Gold Coast
21	Shanice Parker	2	1	0	4	Newcastle Knights
19	Hailee-Jay Ormond-Maunsell	1	0	0	0	Gold Coast
6	Laishon Albert-Jones	1	0	0	0	Akarana Falcons
20	Crystal Tamarua	1	0	0	0	Brisbane Broncos

Notes

- The squad was announced on 3 October 2022.
- Squad numbers were announced in late October.
- In last October, the New Zealand Rugby League announced that original selection Kararaina Wira-Kohu was withdrawn due to injury and had been replaced by Abigail Roache.
- Mele Hufanga played one match for Tonga in 2020.
- Crystal Tamarua played two matches for the Cook Islands in the 2017 World Cup.
