= 2023 NRL Women's season =

Australian women's rugby league season

NRL Telstra Women's Premiership
- Duration: 11 weeks (9 rounds; SF, GF); 22 July - 1 October
- Teams: 10
- Minor premiers: Newcastle Knights (1st title)
- Matches played: 48
- Broadcast partners: Nine Network; Fox League; Sky Sport (NZ); Sky Sports (UK)
- Champions: Newcastle Knights (2nd title)
- Dally M Award: Tamika Upton
- Top point-scorer: Ali Brigginshaw (84)
- Top try-scorer: Teagan Berry (11)

The 2023 NRLW Premiership was the sixth professional season of Women's rugby league in Australia. As announced in March 2022 by the governing body, the National Rugby League, the number of teams increased from six to ten.
The duration of the season was confirmed by the NRL in a media release on 14 February 2023 as nine rounds followed by semi-finals and a Grand Final.

Contracted players were paid for a seven-week preparation period prior to the commencement of the competition, plus two weeks leave, for a total of 20 weeks. The contract period for players was, however, twelve months. The announcement also confirmed a rise in the salary cap from $350,000 in 2022 to $900,000 in 2023.

== Teams ==
The line-up of teams increased from six to ten. Two of the new clubs announced in October 2022 the appointment of their NRLW coach for the 2023 season.

| Club | Season | Head coach | Captain(s) | Ref |
|---|---|---|---|---|
| Brisbane Broncos | 6th season | Scott Prince | Ali Brigginshaw (10) | |
| Canberra Raiders | 1st season | Darrin Borthwick | Simaima Taufa (9) and Zahara Temara (9) | |
| Cronulla-Sutherland Sharks | 1st season | Tony Herman | Tiana Penitani (9) | |
| Gold Coast Titans | 3rd season | Karyn Murphy | Georgia Hale (11) | |
| Newcastle Knights | 3rd season | Ronald Griffiths | Hannah Southwell (8) and Tamika Upton (11) | |
| North Queensland Cowboys | 1st season | Ben Jeffries | Kirra Dibb (9) and Tallisha Harden (9) | |
| Parramatta Eels | 3rd season | Dean Widders | Kennedy Cherrington (5) and Rachael Pearson (6) | |
| St. George Illawarra Dragons | 6th season | Jamie Soward | Raecene McGregor (9) | |
| Sydney Roosters | 6th season | John Strange | Isabelle Kelly (10) | |
| Wests Tigers | 1st season | Brett Kimmorley | Kezie Apps (7) and Botille Vette-Welsh (7) also Christian Pio (1: Round 9) | |

Notes

- In the Captain(s) column
  - The number next to the name indicates the number of games played as captain
  - The word and indicates joint captains. Of the five clubs that employed joint captains, two clubs had both appear in every match. At two other clubs, the Knights and Eels, only one of the pair played in every game.
  - The word also indicates the player deputised as captain when the regular captain missed one or more matches. This was the case at the Wests Tigers, as both joint captains missed their Round 9 match.

== Scheduling ==
The season saw the ten teams play each other once across nine rounds, followed by a two-week final series that involved the top four teams. They played semi-finals with the winners meeting in the Grand Final.

Scheduling of the season allowed for:

- An All Stars match on 11 February 2023.
- State Competitions in which most NRLW players participated.
  - New South Wales — 11 rounds and a Finals Series from 4 February 2023 to 29 April 2023; and
  - Queensland — 7 rounds and a Finals Series from 11 March 2023 to early May 2023;
- A seven-week preparation period.
- Two weeks of leave.
- A two-match Women's State of Origin series on 1 June (Parramatta) and 22 June 2023 (Townsville).

== Pre-season trial matches ==
| Home | Score | Away | Match information | | | | |
| Home | Score | Away | Date and time | Venue | Referees | Attendance | Reports |
|---|---|---|---|---|---|---|---|
| Gold Coast Titans | 30-6 | North Queensland Cowboys | Saturday 1 July | Pizzey Park | | | |
| Parramatta Eels | 18-14 | St. George Illawarra Dragons | Friday 7 July; 7:00 PM | Eric Tweedale Stadium, Granville | Billy Greatbatch | | |
| Cronulla-Sutherland Sharks | 22-0 | Wests Tigers | Saturday 8 July | PointsBet Stadium | Adam Sirriani | | |
| Newcastle Knights | 4-18 | Brisbane Broncos | Saturday 8 July; 3:00 PM | Maitland No.1 Sportsground | Louis Matheson | | |

== Ladder ==
2023 NRLW season
| Pos | Team | Pld | W | D | L | PF | PA | PD | Pts |
|---|---|---|---|---|---|---|---|---|---|
| 1 | Newcastle Knights | 9 | 8 | 0 | 1 | 224 | 119 | +105 | 16 |
| 2 | Sydney Roosters | 9 | 7 | 0 | 2 | 284 | 120 | +164 | 14 |
| 3 | Gold Coast Titans | 9 | 7 | 0 | 2 | 164 | 126 | +38 | 14 |
| 4 | Brisbane Broncos | 9 | 6 | 0 | 3 | 256 | 165 | +91 | 12 |
| 5 | Canberra Raiders | 9 | 5 | 0 | 4 | 173 | 206 | –33 | 10 |
| 6 | Cronulla-Sutherland Sharks | 9 | 4 | 0 | 5 | 202 | 150 | +52 | 8 |
| 7 | St George Illawarra Dragons | 9 | 3 | 0 | 6 | 182 | 210 | –28 | 6 |
| 8 | Wests Tigers | 9 | 2 | 0 | 7 | 136 | 186 | –50 | 4 |
| 9 | North Queensland Cowboys | 9 | 2 | 0 | 7 | 133 | 266 | –133 | 4 |
| 10 | Parramatta Eels | 9 | 1 | 0 | 8 | 104 | 310 | –206 | 2 |

=== Ladder progression ===
- Numbers highlighted in green indicate that the team finished the round inside the top four.
- Numbers highlighted in blue indicates the team finished first on the ladder in that round.
- Numbers highlighted in red indicates the team finished last place on the ladder in that round.

| | Team | 1 | 2 | 3 | 4 | 5 | 6 | 7 | 8 | 9 |
|---|---|---|---|---|---|---|---|---|---|---|
| 1 | Newcastle Knights | 2 | 2 | 4 | 6 | 8 | 10 | 12 | 14 | 16 |
| 2 | Sydney Roosters | 2 | 2 | 4 | 6 | 8 | 10 | 12 | 12 | 14 |
| 3 | Gold Coast Titans | 2 | 4 | 6 | 6 | 6 | 8 | 10 | 12 | 14 |
| 4 | Brisbane Broncos | 0 | 0 | 2 | 4 | 4 | 6 | 8 | 10 | 12 |
| 5 | Canberra Raiders | 0 | 2 | 4 | 6 | 8 | 8 | 8 | 10 | 10 |
| 6 | Cronulla-Sutherland Sharks | 2 | 2 | 2 | 2 | 4 | 4 | 4 | 6 | 8 |
| 7 | St George Illawarra Dragons | 0 | 2 | 2 | 2 | 4 | 4 | 6 | 6 | 6 |
| 8 | Wests Tigers | 2 | 4 | 4 | 4 | 4 | 4 | 4 | 4 | 4 |
| 9 | North Queensland Cowboys | 0 | 2 | 2 | 4 | 4 | 4 | 4 | 4 | 4 |
| 10 | Parramatta Eels | 0 | 0 | 0 | 0 | 0 | 2 | 2 | 2 | 2 |

== Regular season ==
The first announcement of the 2023 NRLW season's fixtures was released by the NRL on 27 April 2023.

=== Round 1 ===
| Home | Score | Away | Match information | | | | |
| Home | Score | Away | Date and time | Venue | Referees | Attendance | Reports |
|---|---|---|---|---|---|---|---|
| Gold Coast Titans | 16-6 | North Queensland Cowboys | Saturday 22 July; 12:50 PM (Note: This NRLW match is part of a double-header with an NRL (Men's) match, with a different opponent.) | Cbus Super Stadium | Belinda Sharpe | 7,926 (Note: Attendance for the NRLW match in a double-header, distinct from the NRL (Men's) match attendance.) | NRL |
| Newcastle Knights | 32-16 | St. George Illawarra Dragons | Saturday 22 July; 3:10 PM | McDonald Jones Stadium | Darian Furner | 8,109 | NRL |
| Brisbane Broncos | 18-36 | Sydney Roosters | Saturday 22 July; 7:45 PM | Sunshine Coast Stadium | Wyatt Raymond | 2,832 | NRL |
| Parramatta Eels | 8-36 | Wests Tigers | Sunday 23 July; 12:00 PM | CommBank Stadium | Rochelle Tamarua | 2,095 | NRL |
| Cronulla-Sutherland Sharks | 28-14 | Canberra Raiders | Sunday 23 July; 1:50 PM | PointsBet Stadium | Kasey Badger | 10,634 (Note: Attendance for the NRL (Men's) match in a double-header, indistinct from the attendance to the NRLW match.) | NRL |

=== Round 2 ===
| Home | Score | Away | Match information | | | | |
| Home | Score | Away | Date and time | Venue | Referees | Attendance | Reports |
|---|---|---|---|---|---|---|---|
| Brisbane Broncos | 16-17 (GP) | Gold Coast Titans | Thursday 27 July; 5:40 PM | The Gabba | Belinda Sharpe | 7,279 | NRL |
| Canberra Raiders | 24-14 | Sydney Roosters | Saturday 29 July; 12:50 PM | GIO Stadium | Cameron Paddy | 8,034 | NRL |
| St. George Illawarra Dragons | 38-12 | Parramatta Eels | Saturday 29 July; 3:00 PM | WIN Stadium | Wyatt Raymond | 5,872 | NRL |
| Newcastle Knights | 20-31 | North Queensland Cowboys | Sunday 30 July; 12:00 PM | Belmore Sports Ground | Kasey Badger | 1,584 (Note: Attendance for the first match in an NRLW double-header, when announced separately.) | NRL |
| Wests Tigers | 10-0 | Cronulla-Sutherland Sharks | Sunday 30 July; 1:50 PM | Belmore Sports Ground | Rochelle Tamarua | 2,196 (Note: Attendance for the second match in an NRLW double-header, when announced separately.) | NRL |

=== Round 3 ===
| Home | Score | Away | Match information | | | | |
| Home | Score | Away | Date and time | Venue | Referees | Attendance | Reports |
|---|---|---|---|---|---|---|---|
| Sydney Roosters | 30-0 | St. George Illawarra Dragons | Thursday 3 August; 5:40 PM | Sydney Cricket Ground | Wyatt Raymond | 4,201 | NRL |
| North Queensland Cowboys | 12-40 | Brisbane Broncos | Saturday 5 August; 12:50 PM (Note: This NRLW match is part of a double-header with an NRL (Men's) match, with the same opponent.) | Queensland Country Bank Stadium | Nick Pelgrave | | NRL |
| Cronulla-Sutherland Sharks | 8-10 | Gold Coast Titans | Saturday 5 August; 3:10 PM | PointsBet Stadium | Darian Furner | 3,021 | NRL |
| Parramatta Eels | 4-38 | Newcastle Knights | Sunday 6 August; 12:00 PM | CommBank Stadium | Belinda Sharpe | 23,596 | NRL |
| Canberra Raiders | 28-22 | Wests Tigers | Sunday 6 August; 1:50 PM | GIO Stadium | Damian Brady | 7,140 | NRL |

=== Round 4 ===
| Home | Score | Away | Match information | | | | |
| Home | Score | Away | Date and time | Venue | Referees | Attendance | Reports |
|---|---|---|---|---|---|---|---|
| St. George Illawarra Dragons | 18-19 (GP) | Canberra Raiders | Saturday 12 August; 11:05 AM | WIN Stadium | Kasey Badger | | NRL |
| North Queensland Cowboys | 16-12 | Wests Tigers | Saturday 12 August; 12:50 PM | Totally Workwear Stadium | Ziggy Przeklasa-Adamski | 1,173 | NRL |
| Brisbane Broncos | 22-12 | Parramatta Eels | Saturday 12 August; 3:10 PM | Totally Workwear Stadium | Rochelle Tamarua | 1,811 | NRL |
| Cronulla-Sutherland Sharks | 12-36 | Sydney Roosters | Sunday 13 August; 12:03 PM | PointsBet Stadium | Belinda Sharpe | 1,920 | NRL |
| Newcastle Knights | 22-10 | Gold Coast Titans | Sunday 13 August; 1:50 PM | McDonald Jones Stadium | Liam Kennedy | 12,889 | NRL |

=== Round 5 ===
| Home | Score | Away | Match information | | | | |
| Home | Score | Away | Date and time | Venue | Referees | Attendance | Reports |
|---|---|---|---|---|---|---|---|
| North Queensland Cowboys | 12-40 | Cronulla-Sutherland Sharks | Saturday 19 August; 11:05 AM | Queensland Country Bank Stadium | Belinda Sharpe | 1,878 | NRL |
| Wests Tigers | 16-20 | St. George Illawarra Dragons | Saturday 19 August; 12:50 PM | CommBank Stadium | Ziggy Przeklasa-Adamski | 3,652 | NRL |
| Gold Coast Titans | 8-30 | Sydney Roosters | Saturday 19 August; 3:10 PM | Cbus Super Stadium | Rochelle Tamarua | 6,943 | NRL |
| Newcastle Knights | 22-20 | Brisbane Broncos | Sunday 20 August; 12:03 PM | McDonald Jones Stadium | Darian Furner | 17,043 | NRL |
| Canberra Raiders | 28-22 | Parramatta Eels | Sunday 20 August; 1:45 PM | GIO Stadium | Kasey Badger | 7,185 | NRL |

=== Round 6 ===
| Home | Score | Away | Match information | | | | |
| Home | Score | Away | Date and time | Venue | Referees | Attendance | Reports |
|---|---|---|---|---|---|---|---|
| Parramatta Eels | 16-12 | North Queensland Cowboys | Saturday 26 August; 11:05 AM | Netstrata Jubilee Stadium | Cameron Paddy | 520 | NRL |
| St. George Illawarra Dragons | 22-23 | Gold Coast Titans | Saturday 26 August; 1:15 PM | Netstrata Jubilee Stadium | Belinda Sharpe | 1,312 | NRL |
| Sydney Roosters | 48-10 | Wests Tigers | Saturday 26 August; 3:10 PM | Allianz Stadium | Mitch Currie | 8,161 | NRL |
| Brisbane Broncos | 40-8 | Canberra Raiders | Sunday 27 August; 12:03 PM | Totally Workwear Stadium | Rochelle Tamarua | 1,692 | NRL |
| Newcastle Knights | 22-14 | Cronulla-Sutherland Sharks | Sunday 27 August; 1:45 PM | McDonald Jones Stadium | Kasey Badger | 19,519 | NRL |

=== Round 7 ===
| Home | Score | Away | Match information | | | | |
| Home | Score | Away | Date and time | Venue | Referees | Attendance | Reports |
|---|---|---|---|---|---|---|---|
| Canberra Raiders | 12-20 | Newcastle Knights | Saturday 2 September; 11:05 AM | GIO Stadium | Wyatt Raymond | 1,962 | NRL |
| Brisbane Broncos | 32-28 | Cronulla-Sutherland Sharks | Saturday 2 September; 12:50 PM | Queensland Country Bank Stadium | Nick Pelgrave | 1,478 | NRL |
| North Queensland Cowboys | 16-48 | St. George Illawarra Dragons | Saturday 2 September; 3:10 PM | Queensland Country Bank Stadium | Liam Kennedy | 2,497 | NRL |
| Gold Coast Titans | 16-4 | Wests Tigers | Sunday 3 September; 12:03 PM | Cbus Super Stadium | Rochelle Tamarua | 4,790 | NRL |
| Sydney Roosters | 46-12 | Parramatta Eels | Sunday 3 September; 1:50 PM | Industree Group Stadium | Darian Furner | 3,756 | NRL |

=== Round 8 ===
| Home | Score | Away | Match information | | | | |
| Home | Score | Away | Date and time | Venue | Referees | Attendance | Reports |
|---|---|---|---|---|---|---|---|
| Cronulla-Sutherland Sharks | 16-8 | St. George Illawarra Dragons | Thursday 7 September; 7:45 PM | PointsBet Stadium | Wyatt Raymond | 1,630 | NRL |
| Wests Tigers | 18-22 | Brisbane Broncos | Saturday 9 September; 11:30 AM | McDonald Jones Stadium | Darian Furner | | NRL |
| Newcastle Knights | 20-4 | Sydney Roosters | Saturday 9 September; 1:30 PM | McDonald Jones Stadium | Kasey Badger | 3,643 | NRL |
| North Queensland Cowboys | 12-34 | Canberra Raiders | Sunday 10 September; 11:30 AM | Cbus Super Stadium | Belinda Sharpe | 1,096 | NRL |
| Gold Coast Titans | 34-12 | Parramatta Eels | Sunday 10 September; 1:30 PM | Cbus Super Stadium | Rochelle Tamarua | 2,086 | NRL |

=== Round 9 ===
| Home | Score | Away | Match information | | | | |
| Home | Score | Away | Date and time | Venue | Referees | Attendance | Reports |
|---|---|---|---|---|---|---|---|
| Wests Tigers | 8-28 | Newcastle Knights | Thursday 14 September; 7:45 PM | Leichhardt Oval | Rochelle Tamarua | 1,733 | NRL |
| Sydney Roosters | 40-16 | North Queensland Cowboys | Saturday 16 September; 6:00 PM | Netstrata Jubilee Stadium | Wyatt Raymond | 632 | NRL |
| St. George Illawarra Dragons | 12-46 | Brisbane Broncos | Saturday 16 September; 8:10 PM | Netstrata Jubilee Stadium | Belinda Sharpe | 1,736 | NRL |
| Parramatta Eels | 6-56 | Cronulla-Sutherland Sharks | Sunday 17 September; 1:00 PM | GIO Stadium | Darian Furner | | NRL |
| Canberra Raiders | 6-30 | Gold Coast Titans | Sunday 17 September; 3:15 PM | GIO Stadium | Kasey Badger | 2,889 | NRL |

== Finals Series ==
On 25 August 2023, the NRL announced that both NRLW semi-finals will be played on Sunday, 24 September 2023, at the respective, selected home grounds of the teams that finish 1st and 2nd on the ladder. The matches will be 2nd vs 3rd and 1st vs 4th. Within two hours of full time in the last regular season match, the NRL announced the kick-off times of the semi-finals and confirmed the venues.

| Home | Score | Away | Match information | | | | |
| Home | Score | Away | Date and time | Venue | Referees | Attendance | Reports |
|---|---|---|---|---|---|---|---|
| Newcastle Knights | 30-24 | Brisbane Broncos | Sunday. 24 September; 2:05 PM | McDonald Jones Stadium | Belinda Sharpe | 12,689 | NRL |
| Sydney Roosters | 0-12 | Gold Coast Titans | Sunday. 24 September; 4:15 PM | Allianz Stadium | Kasey Badger | 3,028 | NRL |

== Grand Final ==
On 24 July 2023 the ARLC confirmed the men's and women's final will be held in Sydney on a one-year deal, while the new Minns Government continues to negotiate with the ARLC for further stadium upgrades for both NRL competitions.

| Home | Score | Away | Match information | | | | |
| Home | Score | Away | Date and time | Venue | Referees | Attendance | Reports |
|---|---|---|---|---|---|---|---|
| Newcastle Knights | 24-18 | Gold Coast Titans | Sunday 1 October 3:55 PM | Accor Stadium | Belinda Sharpe | 40,649 | NRL |

== Team of the week ==
At the conclusion of each round, the media department of the NRL announce a team of the week. Seventeen players are named.

=== Round 1 to Round 5 ===
| Jersey | Position | Round 1 | Round 2 | Round 3 | Round 4 | Round 5 |
|---|---|---|---|---|---|---|
| 1 | Fullback | Evania Pelite | Teagan Berry | Evania Pelite | Tamika Upton | Tamika Upton |
| 2 | Wing | Sheridan Gallagher | Jakiya Whitfeld | Sheridan Gallagher | Jakiya Whitfeld | Shakiah Tungai |
| 3 | Centre | Leianne Tufuga | Cheyelle Robins-Reti | Mele Hufanga | Bobbi Law | Tiana Penitani |
| 4 | Centre | Jessica Sergis | Jasmine Peters | Isabelle Kelly | Isabelle Kelly | Shanice Parker |
| 5 | Wing | Madison Bartlett | Annessa Biddle | Jayme Fressard | Jayme Fressard | Shenai Lendill |
| 6 | Fullback | Emma Tonegato | Zahara Temara | Tarryn Aiken | Tahlulah Tillett | Tarryn Aiken |
| 7 | Halfback | Ali Brigginshaw | Raecene McGregor | Ashleigh Quinlan | Ali Brigginshaw | Ali Brigginshaw |
| 8 | Prop | Sarah Togatuki | Christian Pio | Sarah Togatuki | Sarah Togatuki | Ellie Johnston |
| 9 | Hooker | Quincy Dodd | Emma Manzelmann | Destiny Brill | Chanté Temara | Quincy Dodd |
| 10 | Prop | Millie Boyle | Shannon Mato | Chelsea Lenarduzzi | Chelsea Lenarduzzi | Shannon Mato |
| 11 | Second-row | Shaniah Power | Kezie Apps | Amelia Pasikala | Romy Teitzel | Otesa Pule |
| 12 | Second-row | Yasmin Clydsdale | Monalisa Soliola | Yasmin Clydsdale | Mahalia Murphy | Yasmin Clydsdale |
| 13 | Lock | Ellie Johnston | Simaima Taufa | Simaima Taufa | Simaima Taufa | Alexis Tauaneai |
| 14 | interchange | Ebony Prior | Tyla Nathan-Wong | Gayle Broughton | Fran Goldthorp | Jada Taylor |
| 15 | interchange | Botille Vette-Welsh | Grace Kemp | Jessika Elliston | Rima Butler | Mariah Denman |
| 16 | interchange | Teagan Berry | Georgia Hale | Kayla Romaniuk | Teagan Berry | Jakiya Whitfeld |
| 17 | interchange | Shannon Mato | Kirra Dibb | Alexis Tauaneai | Makenzie Weale | Cassey Tohi-Hiku |

=== Round 6 to Semi-Finals ===
| Jersey | Position | Round 6 | Round 7 | Round 8 | Round 9 |
|---|---|---|---|---|---|
| 1 | Fullback | Teagan Berry | Tamika Upton | Tamika Upton | Evania Pelite |
| 2 | Wing | Julia Robinson | Madison Bartlett | Shakiah Tungai | Julia Robinson |
| 3 | Centre | Jaime Chapman | Shenai Lendill | Jaime Chapman | Mele Hufanga |
| 4 | Centre | Jessica Sergis | Mackenzie Wiki | Tiana Penitani | Annessa Biddle |
| 5 | Wing | Brydie Parker | Karina Brown | Cassie Staples | Jakiya Whitfeld |
| 6 | Fullback | Gayle Broughton | Tarryn Aiken | Zahara Temara | Tarryn Aiken |
| 7 | Halfback | Ali Brigginshaw | Jesse Southwell | Jesse Southwell | Tayla Preston |
| 8 | Prop | Millie Boyle | Shannon Mato | Caitlan Johnston | Caitlan Johnston |
| 9 | Hooker | Rueben Cherrington | Destiny Brill | Destiny Brill | Destiny Brill |
| 10 | Prop | Jessika Elliston | Angelina Teakaraanga-Katoa | Brianna Clark | Ellie Johnston |
| 11 | Second-row | Olivia Kernick | Otesa Pule | Kezie Apps | Otesa Pule |
| 12 | Second-row | Mahalia Murphy | Ella Koster | Yasmin Clydsdale | Yasmin Clydsdale |
| 13 | Lock | Georgia Hale | Georgia Hale | Holli Wheeler | Holli Wheeler |
| 14 | interchange | Lauren Brown | Keeley Davis | Emma Tonegato | Abigail Roache |
| 15 | interchange | Caitlan Johnston | Gayle Broughton | Apii Nicholls | Isabelle Kelly |
| 16 | interchange | Tyla Amiatu | Annetta Nu'uausala | Chantay Kiria-Ratu | Shaylee Bent |
| 17 | interchange | Shenae Ciesiolka | Emma Tonegato | Rikeya Horne | Shannon Mato |

== Team of the Year ==
=== Dally M Team of the Year ===
Announced on the evening of 27 September 2023.

| Jersey | Position | Player |
|---|---|---|
| 1 | Fullback | Tamika Upton |
| 2 | Wing | Jakiya Whitfeld |
| 3 | Centre | Isabelle Kelly |
| 4 | Centre | Mele Hufanga |
| 5 | Wing | Julia Robinson |
| 6 | Fullback | Tarryn Aiken |
| 7 | Halfback | Ali Brigginshaw |
| 8 | Prop | Shannon Mato |
| 9 | Hooker | Destiny Brill |
| 10 | Prop | Sarah Togatuki |
| 11 | Second-row | Yasmin Clydsdale |
| 12 | Second-row | Olivia Kernick |
| 13 | Lock | Simaima Taufa |

=== Players' Dream Team ===
The Rugby League Players Association announced the 2023 Players' Dream team on 29 September 2023.

| Jersey | Position | Player |
|---|---|---|
| 1 | Fullback | Teagan Berry |
| 2 | Wing | Jakiya Whitfeld |
| 3 | Centre | Shanice Parker |
| 4 | Centre | Mele Hufanga |
| 5 | Wing | Annessa Biddle |
| 6 | Fullback | Tarryn Aiken |
| 7 | Halfback | Ali Brigginshaw |
| 8 | Prop | Shannon Mato |
| 9 | Hooker | Emma Manzelmann |
| 10 | Prop | Sarah Togatuki |
| 11 | Second-row | Yasmin Clydsdale |
| 12 | Second-row | Otesa Pule |
| 13 | Lock | Simaima Taufa |

== Individual Awards ==
=== Dally M Medal Awards Night ===
Announced on the evening of 27 September 2023

Dally M Medal Player of the Year:
Tamika Upton ( Newcastle Knights)

Veronica White Medal:
Tahlulah Tillett ( North Queensland Cowboys).

Captain of the Year:
Simaima Taufa ( Canberra Raiders).

Coach of the Year:
Karyn Murphy ( Gold Coast Titans).

Provan-Summons Medal:
Lavinia Gould ( Brisbane Broncos).

Rookie of the Year:
Annessa Biddle ( Cronulla-Sutherland Sharks).

Try of the Year:
Jesse Southwell ( Newcastle Knights)
vs Sydney Roosters in Round 9.

Tackle of the Year:
Jakiya Whitfeld ( Wests Tigers)
vs Sydney Roosters in Round 6.

=== Grand Final Day Awards ===
The following awards were presented at Olympic Park, New South Wales on Grand Final day, 1 October 2023.
Karyn Murphy Medal Player of the Match:
Tamika Upton Newcastle Knights

=== RLPA Players' Champion Awards ===
The following awards were voted for by NRLW players and announced at the end of the season.
The Players' Champion:
Teagan Berry ( St. George Illawarra Dragons)

Rookie of the Year:
Annessa Biddle ( Cronulla Sharks)

The following award, selected from five nominees, was announced at the end of the season.
Dennis Tutty Award:
Chelsea Lenarduzzi ( Brisbane Broncos)

The Rugby League Players Association announced monthly awards during the season. A panel of three former players selected five players for each month. All current players were eligible to vote for the monthly awards.

- July: Zahara Temara ( Canberra Raiders)
- August: Tarryn Aiken ( Sydney Roosters)

=== Statistical Awards ===
Highest Point Scorer in Regular-season: Ali Brigginshaw ( Brisbane Broncos) 80 (5t 30g)
Top Try Scorer in Regular-season: Teagan Berry ( St George Illawarra Dragons) 11

=== Club Awards ===
| Club | Player of the Year | Player's Player | Members' Award | Coach's Award | Rookie / Emerging Talent | Community | Ref |
|---|---|---|---|---|---|---|---|
| Brisbane | Mariah Denman | Mariah Denman & Mele Hufanga | — | — | Mele Hufanga | — | |
| Canberra | Simaima Taufa | — | — | Janelle Williams | Cheyelle Robins-Reti | — | |
| Cronulla | Tiana Penitani | Annessa Biddle | — | — | Annessa Biddle | Jada Taylor | |
| Gold Coast | Shannon Mato | — | Evania Pelite | Georgia Hale | Chantay Kiria-Ratu | Steph Hancock | |
| Newcastle | Tamika Upton | Tamika Upton & Shanice Parker | — | Yasmin Clydsdale | Sheridan Gallagher | Kayla Romaniuk | |
| North Queensland | Emma Manzelmann | Emma Manzelmann | Kirra Dibb | China Polata | Fran Goldthorp | — | |
| Parramatta | Abbi Church | Cassey Tohi-Hiku | Abbi Church | Mahalia Murphy | — | Shontelle Stowers | |
| St George Illawarra | Teagan Berry | — | Teagan Berry | Alexis Tauaneai | Ella Koster | — | |
| Sydney | Tarryn Aiken | Corban Baxter | — | — | Mia Wood | Brydie Parker | |
| Wests Tigers | Sarah Togatuki | Sarah Togatuki | — | — | Eliza Siilata | — | |

As clubs each define their own award categories there are awards that do not fit into the above categories:

- Brisbane Broncos
  - Most Consistent: Mariah Denman
  - Best Back: Ali Brigginshaw
  - Best Forward: Annetta Nu'uausala
  - Play of the Year: Mele Hufanga (Round 3 four tries v Cowboys)
- Canberra Raiders
  - Junior Representative Player of the Year: Georgia Willey
- Cronulla Sharks
  - Education Excellence Award: Andie Robinson
- Gold Coast Titans
  - "The Preston" Award (full club award): Steph Hancock
- Newcastle Knights
  - Thrive Award: Tiana Davison
  - Gladiator of the Year: Yasmin Clydsdale
- Sydney Roosters
  - Try of the Year: Tarryn Aiken
- Wests Tigers
  - NSW Women's Premiership Players’ Player: Ebony Prior
  - NSW Women's Premiership Player of the Year: Christian Pio
  - Tarsha Gale Cup Players’ Player: Claire Kennedy
  - Tarsha Gale Cup Player of the Year: Jae Patu
  - Lisa Fiaola Cup Players’ Player: Lucyannah Luamanu
  - Lisa Fiaola Cup Player of the Year: Angel Schaafhausen-Mino
  - Woman of the Year: Danielle Sherd

== Players and transfers ==
Player signings for the 2023 season were effectively placed on hold until an in-principle agreement between the NRL and RLPA was reached. This was announced on 14 February 2023.

The 2023 season salary cap for clubs is $900,000 and the minimum wage for contracted players is $30,000. Squad size is 24 players plus 4 development players. The official signing period commenced on 29 March 2023. Clubs are required to fill their 24-player roster by 24 May 2023.

Table last updated: 25 May 2023.

2023 NRLW Transfers
| Player | 2022 Club | 2023 Club | Announcement Date | Reference |
|---|---|---|---|---|
| Bobbi Law | Newcastle Knights | St George Illawarra Dragons | 29 Mar 2023 | |
| Sara Sautia | Brisbane Broncos | St George Illawarra Dragons | 29 Mar 2023 | |
| Angelina Teakaraanga Katoa | Sydney Roosters | St George Illawarra Dragons | 29 Mar 2023 | |
| Cortez Te Pou | No Club | St George Illawarra Dragons | 29 Mar 2023 | |
| Jamilee Bright | No Club | St George Illawarra Dragons | 29 Mar 2023 | |
| Raecene McGregor | Sydney Roosters | St George Illawarra Dragons | 29 Mar 2023 | |
| Simaima Taufa | Parramatta Eels | Canberra Raiders | 30 Mar 2023 | |
| Kaarla Cowan | No Club | St George Illawarra Dragons | 31 Mar 2023 | |
| Maddison Weatherall | No Club | St George Illawarra Dragons | 31 Mar 2023 | |
| Ella Koster | No Club | St George Illawarra Dragons | 31 Mar 2023 | |
| Margot Vella | NSW Waratahs Women (Union) | St George Illawarra Dragons | 31 Mar 2023 | |
| Jaime Chapman | Brisbane Broncos | Gold Coast Titans | 31 Mar 2023 | |
| Shaylee Bent | St George Illawarra Dragons | Gold Coast Titans | 31 Mar 2023 | |
| Gayle Broughton | Parramatta Eels | Brisbane Broncos | 31 Mar 2023 | |
| Destiny Brill | Sydney Roosters | Brisbane Broncos | 2 Apr 2023 | |
| Romy Teitzel | Newcastle Knights | Brisbane Broncos | 2 Apr 2023 | |
| Monalisa Soliola | St George Illawarra Dragons | Canberra Raiders | 3 Apr 2023 | |
| Zahara Temara | Sydney Roosters | Canberra Raiders | 3 Apr 2023 | |
| Emily Bass | Brisbane Broncos | Gold Coast Titans | 3 Apr 2023 | |
| Dannii Perese | Brisbane Broncos (Development) | Gold Coast Titans | 3 Apr 2023 | |
| Kaitlyn Phillips | Brisbane Broncos | Gold Coast Titans | 3 Apr 2023 | |
| Taliah Fuimaono | St George Illawarra Dragons | Gold Coast Titans | 4 Apr 2023 | |
| Emma Manzelmann | Newcastle Knights | North Queensland Cowboys | 4 Apr 2023 | |
| Kezie Apps | St George Illawarra Dragons | Wests Tigers | 4 Apr 2023 | |
| Sarah Togatuki | Sydney Roosters | Wests Tigers | 4 Apr 2023 | |
| Botille Vette-Welsh | Season-long Injury | Wests Tigers | 4 Apr 2023 | |
| Sophie Holyman | Brisbane Broncos | Canberra Raiders | 5 Apr 2023 | |
| Ashleigh Quinlan | Parramatta Eels | Canberra Raiders | 5 Apr 2023 | |
| Mele Hufanga | No Club | Brisbane Broncos | 5 Apr 2023 | |
| Tahlulah Tillett | No Club | North Queensland Cowboys | 6 Apr 2023 | |
| Tazmin Gray | Gold Coast Titans | Brisbane Broncos | 6 Apr 2023 | |
| Macie Carlile | No Club | St George Illawarra Dragons | 6 Apr 2023 | |
| Rachael Pearson | St George Illawarra Dragons | Parramatta Eels | 7 Apr 2023 | |
| Sophie Clancy | No Club | St George Illawarra Dragons | 8 Apr 2023 | |
| Jasmine Peters | Gold Coast Titans | North Queensland Cowboys | 10 Apr 2023 | |
| Najvada George | Parramatta Eels | Wests Tigers | 10 Apr 2023 | |
| Rikeya Horne | Parramatta Eels | Wests Tigers | 10 Apr 2023 | |
| Losana Lutu | Parramatta Eels | Wests Tigers | 10 Apr 2023 | |
| Christian Pio | Parramatta Eels | Wests Tigers | 10 Apr 2023 | |
| Tess Staines | Parramatta Eels | Wests Tigers | 10 Apr 2023 | |
| Madison Bartlett | Gold Coast Titans | Canberra Raiders | 11 Apr 2023 | |
| Shakiah Tungai | Brisbane Broncos | Canberra Raiders | 11 Apr 2023 | |
| Quincy Dodd | St George Illawarra Dragons | Cronulla-Sutherland Sharks | 12 Apr 2023 | |
| Ashleigh Werner | No Club | Brisbane Broncos | 12 Apr 2023 | |
| Shaniah Power | Sydney Roosters | North Queensland Cowboys | 12 Apr 2023 | |
| Hollie Dodd | York Valkyrie | Canberra Raiders | 14 Apr 2023 | |
| Mackenzie Wiki | No Club | Canberra Raiders | 14 Apr 2023 | |
| Filomina Hanisi | Parramatta Eels | Brisbane Broncos | 14 Apr 2023 | |
| Roxy Murdoch-Masila | Gold Coast Titans | St George Illawarra Dragons | 15 Apr 2023 | |
| Emma Tonegato | St George Illawarra Dragons | Cronulla-Sutherland Sharks | 16 Apr 2023 | |
| Taylor-Adeline Mapusua | No Club | St George Illawarra Dragons | 18 Apr 2023 | |
| Kirra Dibb | Newcastle Knights | North Queensland Cowboys | 19 Apr 2023 | |
| Felice Quinlan | No Club | Canberra Raiders | 19 Apr 2023 | |
| Tommaya Kelly-Sines | No Club | Canberra Raiders | 19 Apr 2023 | |
| Chante Temara | Sydney Roosters | Canberra Raiders | 19 Apr 2023 | |
| Niall Williams Guthrie | New Zealand (Union 7s) | Gold Coast Titans | 20 Apr 2023 | |
| Lauren Dam | No Club | Brisbane Broncos | 20 Apr 2023 | |
| Holli Wheeler | St George Illawarra Dragons | Cronulla-Sutherland Sharks | 20 Apr 2023 | |
| Millie Boyle | Newcastle Knights | Sydney Roosters | 21 Apr 2023 | |
| Keeley Davis | St George Illawarra Dragons | Sydney Roosters | 21 Apr 2023 | |
| Amber Hall | Brisbane Broncos | Sydney Roosters | 21 Apr 2023 | |
| Ua Ravu | No Club | Canberra Raiders | 21 Apr 2023 | |
| Elise Smith | No Club | Canberra Raiders | 21 Apr 2023 | |
| Bianca Bennetts | No Club | Wests Tigers | 23 Apr 2023 | |
| Emily Curtain | Gold Coast Titans | Wests Tigers | 23 Apr 2023 | |
| Sophie Curtain | No Club | Wests Tigers | 23 Apr 2023 | |
| Imogen Gobran | No Club | Wests Tigers | 23 Apr 2023 | |
| Jessica Kennedy | No Club | Wests Tigers | 23 Apr 2023 | |
| Josephine Lenaz | No Club | Wests Tigers | 23 Apr 2023 | |
| Rebecca Pollard | No Club | Wests Tigers | 23 Apr 2023 | |
| Ebony Prior | No Club | Wests Tigers | 23 Apr 2023 | |
| Hope Tevaga | No Club | Wests Tigers | 23 Apr 2023 | |
| Jada Taylor | Sydney Roosters | Cronulla-Sutherland Sharks | 24 Apr 2023 | |
| Essay Banu | No Club | North Queensland Cowboys | 24 Apr 2023 | |
| Sera Koroi | No Club | North Queensland Cowboys | 24 Apr 2023 | |
| Shellie Long | No Club | North Queensland Cowboys | 24 Apr 2023 | |
| Jessikah Reeves | No Club | North Queensland Cowboys | 24 Apr 2023 | |
| Chantay Kiria-Ratu | Gold Coast Titans (Development) | Gold Coast Titans | 26 Apr 2023 | |
| Elsie Albert | St George Illawarra Dragons | Parramatta Eels | 27 Apr 2023 | |
| Tarryn Aiken | Brisbane Broncos | Sydney Roosters | 27 Apr 2023 | |
| Kerehitina Matua | No Club | Canberra Raiders | 27 Apr 2023 | |
| Apii Nicholls | Gold Coast Titans | Canberra Raiders | 27 Apr 2023 | |
| Tegan Dymock | St George Illawarra Dragons | Cronulla-Sutherland Sharks | 27 Apr 2023 | |
| Talei Holmes | St George Illawarra Dragons | Cronulla-Sutherland Sharks | 27 Apr 2023 | |
| Andie Robinson | St George Illawarra Dragons | Cronulla-Sutherland Sharks | 27 Apr 2023 | |
| Maddie Studdon | No Club | Cronulla-Sutherland Sharks | 27 Apr 2023 | |
| Kiana Takairangi | Newcastle Knights | Cronulla-Sutherland Sharks | 27 Apr 2023 | |
| Rilee Jorgensen | Gold Coast Titans (Development) | Gold Coast Titans | 28 Apr 2023 | |
| Sienna Lofipo | Gold Coast Titans (Development) | Gold Coast Titans | 28 Apr 2023 | |
| Destiny Mino-Sinapati | Gold Coast Titans (Development) | Gold Coast Titans | 28 Apr 2023 | |
| Fran Goldthorp | Leeds Rhinos | North Queensland Cowboys | 29 Apr 2023 | |
| Nakia Davis-Welsh | No Club | Parramatta Eels | 29 Apr 2023 | |
| Brooke Anderson | Parramatta Eels | Cronulla-Sutherland Sharks | 3 May 2023 | |
| Ellie Johnston | Parramatta Eels | Cronulla-Sutherland Sharks | 3 May 2023 | |
| Tayla Preston | Parramatta Eels | Cronulla-Sutherland Sharks | 3 May 2023 | |
| Cassie Staples | St George Illawarra Dragons | Cronulla-Sutherland Sharks | 3 May 2023 | |
| Tyler Bentley | No Club | Sydney Roosters | 4 May 2023 | |
| Teuila Fotu-Moala | No Club | Sydney Roosters | 4 May 2023 | |
| Alexandrea Kiriwi | No Club | Sydney Roosters | 4 May 2023 | |
| Tavarna Papalii | No Club | Sydney Roosters | 4 May 2023 | |
| Lily Rogan | No Club | Sydney Roosters | 4 May 2023 | |
| Shenai Lendill | No Club | St George Illawarra Dragons | 4 May 2023 | |
| Jules Kirkpatrick | No Club | Newcastle Knights | 5 May 2023 | |
| Jasmin Strange | Sydney Roosters | Newcastle Knights | 5 May 2023 | |
| Sareka Mooka | No Club | North Queensland Cowboys | 6 May 2023 | |
| Bree Chester | Newcastle Knights (Development) | North Queensland Cowboys | 10 May 2023 | |
| Jetaya Faifua | Gold Coast Titans | North Queensland Cowboys | 10 May 2023 | |
| Mia Middleton | No Club | North Queensland Cowboys | 10 May 2023 | |
| April Ngatupuna | Gold Coast Titans | North Queensland Cowboys | 10 May 2023 | |
| China Polata | No Club | North Queensland Cowboys | 10 May 2023 | |
| Makenzie Weale | Newcastle Knights | North Queensland Cowboys | 10 May 2023 | |
| Jessica Gentle | Newcastle Knights | Canberra Raiders | 10 May 2023 | |
| Tara Reinke | No Club | Canberra Raiders | 10 May 2023 | |
| Ella Ryan | NSW Waratahs Women (Union) | Canberra Raiders | 10 May 2023 | |
| Laishon Albert-Jones | No Club | Newcastle Knights | 10 May 2023 | |
| Rima Butler | Parramatta Eels | Newcastle Knights | 10 May 2023 | |
| Jayde Herdegen | No Club | Newcastle Knights | 10 May 2023 | |
| Felila Kia | No Club | Newcastle Knights | 10 May 2023 | |
| Tamerah Leati | No Club | Newcastle Knights | 10 May 2023 | |
| Abigail Roache | No Club | Newcastle Knights | 10 May 2023 | |
| Tyla Amiatu | No Club | Parramatta Eels | 10 May 2023 | |
| Rosemarie Beckett | No Club | Parramatta Eels | 10 May 2023 | |
| Pihuka Berryman-Duff | No Club | Parramatta Eels | 10 May 2023 | |
| Jade Fonua | No Club | Parramatta Eels | 10 May 2023 | |
| Amelia Mafi | No Club | Parramatta Eels | 10 May 2023 | |
| Shannon Muru | No Club | Parramatta Eels | 10 May 2023 | |
| Capri Paekau | No Club | Parramatta Eels | 10 May 2023 | |
| Sarah Riordan | No Club | St George Illawarra Dragons | 11 May 2023 | |
| Tallisha Harden | Brisbane Broncos | North Queensland Cowboys | 11 May 2023 | |
| Leianne Tufuga | Sydney Roosters | Wests Tigers | 11 May 2023 | |
| Jakiya Whitfeld | Newcastle Knights | Wests Tigers | 11 May 2023 | |
| Rhiannon Byers | No Club | Cronulla-Sutherland Sharks | 15 May 2023 | |
| Monique Donovan | No Club | Parramatta Eels | 16 May 2023 | |
| Ahlivia Ingram | No Club | Canberra Raiders | 16 May 2023 | |
| Grace Kemp | ACT Brumbies Women (Union) | Canberra Raiders | 17 May 2023 | |
| Cheyelle Robins-Reti | Matatū (Union) | Canberra Raiders | 17 May 2023 | |
| Autumn-Rain Stephens Daly | Newcastle Knights | North Queensland Cowboys | 17 May 2023 | |
| Pauline Piliae-Rasabale | NSW Waratahs (Union) | Wests Tigers | 19 May 2023 | |
| Sheridan Gallagher | Western Sydney Wanderers (Football) | Newcastle Knights | 19 May 2023 | |
| Nita Maynard | Brisbane Broncos | Newcastle Knights | 19 May 2023 | |
| Tiana Raftstrand-Smith | Gold Coast Titans | North Queensland Cowboys | 20 May 2023 | |
| Shaylee Joseph | No Club | North Queensland Cowboys | 23 May 2023 | |
| Libby Surha | No Club | North Queensland Cowboys | 23 May 2023 | |
| Grace Griffin | No Club | Brisbane Broncos | 23 May 2023 | |
| Toni Hunt | Illness | Brisbane Broncos | 23 May 2023 | |
| Harata Butler | No Club | Cronulla-Sutherland Sharks | 23 May 2023 | |
| Vanessa Foliaki | Parramatta Eels | Cronulla-Sutherland Sharks | 23 May 2023 | |
| Fatafehi Hanisi | Injury | Cronulla-Sutherland Sharks | 23 May 2023 | |
| Kelsey Clark | No Club | Parramatta Eels | 23 May 2023 | |
| Madeline Jones | No Club | Parramatta Eels | 23 May 2023 | |
| Talesha O'Neill | No Club | Parramatta Eels | 23 May 2023 | |
| Kyra Simon | Newcastle Knights | Parramatta Eels | 23 May 2023 | |
| Shontelle Stowers | St George Illawarra Dragons | Parramatta Eels | 23 May 2023 | |
| Salma Nour | No Club | Wests Tigers | 23 May 2023 | |
| Taylor Osborne | No Club | Wests Tigers | 23 May 2023 | |
| Eliza Siilata | No Club | Wests Tigers | 23 May 2023 | |
| Folau Vaki | No Club | Wests Tigers | 23 May 2023 | |
| Tyla Nathan-Wong | New Zealand (Union 7s) | St George Illawarra Dragons | 24 May 2023 | |
| Corban Baxter | Pregnancy | Sydney Roosters | 24 May 2023 | |
| Brydie Parker | Injury | Sydney Roosters | 24 May 2023 | |
| Tafito Lafaele | Blues Women (Union) | Brisbane Broncos | 24 May 2023 | |
| Emma Barnes | No Club | Canberra Raiders | 24 May 2023 | |
| Annessa Biddle | No Club | Cronulla-Sutherland Sharks | 24 May 2023 | |
| Fiona Jahnke | No Club | Cronulla-Sutherland Sharks | 24 May 2023 | |
| Sereana Naitokatoka | No Club | Cronulla-Sutherland Sharks | 24 May 2023 | |
| Georgia Ravics | No Club | Cronulla-Sutherland Sharks | 24 May 2023 | |
| Chloe Saunders | No Club | Cronulla-Sutherland Sharks | 24 May 2023 | |
| Jazmon Tupou-Witchman | No Club | Cronulla-Sutherland Sharks | 24 May 2023 | |
| Vitalina Naikore | Fijiana Drua (Union) | North Queensland Cowboys | 25 May 2023 | |
| Merewalesi Rokouono | Fijiana Drua (Union) | North Queensland Cowboys | 25 May 2023 | |
| Tiana Penitani | Parramatta Eels | Cronulla-Sutherland Sharks | 25 May 2023 | |
| Viena Tinao | No Club | Newcastle Knights | 25 May 2023 | |
