= 2021 Women's Rugby League World Cup =

Sixth staging of the Women's Rugby League World Cup

- Number of teams: 8
- Host country: England
- Winner: Australia (3rd title)
- Runner-up: New Zealand
- Matches played: 15
- Attendance: 128,098 (8,540 per match)
- Points scored: 728 (48.53 per match)
- Tries scored: 157 (10.47 per match)
- Top scorer: (England) Tara-Jane Stanley; 62 points (6 tries + 19 goals)
- Top try scorer: (Australia) Julia Robinson (7 tries)

The 2021 Women's Rugby League World Cup was the sixth staging of the Women's Rugby League World Cup, and was one of three major tournaments part of the 2021 Rugby League World Cup. The tournament was held in England from 1 November to 19 November 2022. Originally planned for 2021, it was delayed a year along with the men's and wheelchair tournaments due to the COVID-19 pandemic. The tournament featured eight teams, an increase of two from the previous tournament.

For the first time the tournament had parity with the men's and wheelchair tournaments with all participants being paid the same while all 61 matches across three tournaments will be broadcast live.

== Teams ==
=== Qualification ===
The competing teams were selected based on criteria including growth and current infrastructure and were announced on 18 July 2019.

Region	Team	Previous appearances	Previous best result	World ranking	Coach	Captain
Americas	Brazil	0	Debut	11	Paul Grundy	Maria Graf
Americas	Canada	1	Semi-finals (2017)	4	Mike Castle	Gabrielle Hindley
Asia-Pacific	Australia	5	Champions (2013, 2017)	1	Brad Donald	Kezie Apps, Sam Bremner, Ali Brigginshaw
Asia-Pacific	Cook Islands	2	Group stage (2003, 2017)	5	Anthony (Rusty) Matua	Kimiora Breayley-Nati
Asia-Pacific	New Zealand	5	Champions (2000, 2003, 2008)	2	Ricky Henry	Krystal Rota
Asia-Pacific	Papua New Guinea	1	Group stage (2017)	6	Ben Jeffries	Elsie Albert
Europe	England (Note: Competed as part of Great Britain in 2 previous tournaments, finishing as runners-up in 2000.)	3	Semi-finals (2008, 2017)	3	Craig Richards	Emily Rudge
Europe	France	2	Group stage (2008, 2013)	7	Vincent Baloup	Alice Varela

=== Draw ===
The teams were drawn into two groups of four. The two seeded teams were England (Group A) as hosts and Australia as holders (Group B). The draw was made at Buckingham Palace on 16 January 2020. Teams from pool 1 were drawn by Prince Harry, Duke of Sussex, pool 2 was drawn by Katherine Grainger and pool 3 by Jason Robinson.

Ahead of the fixture list being announced, the organisers stated that there would be at least four days between a team's games in the interests of player welfare.

The fixtures were announced on 21 July 2020. Following the postponement of the tournament from 2021 to 2022, a revised schedule was published on 21 November 2021. All the games in the tournament were played as double-headers with other games from either the women's or men's tournaments.

Seeded	Pot 1	Pot 2	Pot 3
Australia; England	New Zealand; Papua New Guinea	Canada; France	Cook Islands; Brazil

=== Squads ===
Each nation announced 24 player squads to compete in the tournament.

== Venues ==
=== Stadiums ===
Five venues were used for the women's tournament. Stadiums are referred to by their official name rather than sponsored name, as is International Rugby League policy

Manchester		Wigan
Old Trafford (Note: Venue of the final in double-header with the Men's final)		DW Stadium
Capacity: 74,994		Capacity: 25,138
2021 Women's Rugby League World Cup is located in Northern England
Hull	Leeds	York
MKM Stadium	Headingley Stadium	York Community Stadium
Capacity: 25,586	Capacity: 21,062	Capacity: 8,500

=== Team base camp locations ===
Two locations were used by the eight national team squads to stay and train before and during the World Cup tournament, as follows;

- Leeds: Brazil, Canada, England and Papua New Guinea
- York: Australia, Cook Islands, France and New Zealand

== Officiating ==
=== Match officials ===
The list of match officials who officiated across both the men's and women's tournaments was published on 5 October 2022.

- Grant Atkins (Australia)
- Kasey Badger (Australia)
- Dean Bowmer (England)
- Ben Casty (France)
- James Child (England)
- Darian Furner (Australia)
- Adam Gee (Australia)
- Tom Grant (England)
- Marcus Griffiths (England)
- Robert Hicks (England)
- Neil Horton (England)
- Chris Kendall (England)
- Ashley Klein (Australia)
- Aaron Moore (England)
- Liam Moore (England)
- Paki Parkinson (New Zealand)
- Geoffrey Poumes (France)
- Wyatt Raymond (Australia)
- Liam Rush (England)
- Belinda Sharpe (Australia)
- (New Zealand) Michael Smaill (England) (Note: Smaill is a New Zealander who is currently based in England.)
- Jack Smith (England)
- Todd Smith (Australia)
- Gerard Sutton (Australia)
- Rochelle Tamarua (New Zealand)
- Ben Thaler (England)
- Warren Turley (England)
- (Australia) James Vella (England) (Note: Vella is an Australian who is currently based in England.)

== Warm-up matches ==
Pre-tournament practice matches took place in the weeks before the first round of group stage matches of the World Cup.

20 October 2022
19:00 BST (UTC+01:00)

York Valkyrie	0–38	Papua New Guinea
	Report

York St John University Sports Park, York

25 October 2022
14:00 BST (UTC+01:00)

Ireland	8–6	Canada
	Report

Orrell St James Rugby League Club, Wigan

27 October 2022
14:30 BST (UTC+01:00)

England Knights	14–26	Cook Islands
	Report

Weetwood Sports Park, Leeds

27 October 2022
19:30 BST (UTC+01:00)

Brazil	4–16	France
	Report

Post Office Road, Featherstone

== Group stage ==
=== Group A ===
Pos	Team	Pld	W	D	L	PF	PA	PD	Pts	Qualification
1	England	3	3	0	0	168	12	+156	6	Advance to knockout stage
2	Papua New Guinea	3	2	0	1	108	54	+54	4	Advance to knockout stage
3	Canada	3	1	0	2	38	104	−66	2	
4	Brazil	3	0	0	3	20	164	−144	0	

Source: BBC Sport

1 November 2022
14:30 GMT (UTC±00:00)

England	72–4	Brazil
Tries: Beevers 2'; Hill (3) 16', 22', 73'; Field 28'; Hardcastle (3) 37', 49', 67'; Stanley (2) 6', 40'; Goldthorp 44'; Jones 64'; Burke 70'; Wood 80'; Goals: Stanley (8/14) 23', 29', 38', 45', 65', 68', 74', 80'	Report	Tries: Momberg 59'; Goals: Oliveira (0/1)

Headingley Stadium, Leeds
Attendance: 8,621
Referee: Rochelle Tamarua (New Zealand)
Touch judges: Tom Grant (England), Jack Smith (England)
Player of the Match: Courtney Winfield-Hill (England)

Team details
England		Position	Brazil
Name	Number	Position	Number	Name
Fran Goldthorp	3	Fullback	18	Natalia Momberg
Caitlin Beevers	2	Wing	22	Edna Santini
Tara-Jane Stanley	1	Centre	3	Leticia Medeiros
Amy Hardcastle	4	Centre	1	Adriana Felix
Leah Burke	5	Wing	2	Tati Fernandes
Georgia Roche	6	Stand off/Five eighth	6	Giovana Moura
Courtney Winfield-Hill (c)	7	Scrum half/Half back	7	Maria Graf
Shona Hoyle	17	Prop forward	8	Franciny Amaral
Tara Jones	9	Hooker	9	Patricia Bodeman
Olivia Wood	18	Prop forward	15	Franciele Barros
Vicky Molyneux	14	Second row	11	Patricia Oliveira
Emily Rudge	12	Second row	12	Amanda Welter
Jodie Cunningham	13	Loose forward/Lock forward	13	Barbra Leal
Zoe Harris	22	Interchange	14	Giovanna Barth
Hollie Dodd	11	Interchange	10	Paula Casemiro
Grace Field	15	Interchange	16	Brena Prioste
Victoria Whitfield	8	Interchange	17	Ana Loschi De Quadros
Lois Forsell		Coach		Paul Grundy

1 November 2022
17:00 GMT (UTC±00:00)

Papua New Guinea	34–12	Canada
Tries: Long 25'; Molowia (2) 38', 42'; Ravu 47'; Banu 63'; Gwasamun 76'; Butler 78'; Goals: Veivers (2/5) 43', 80'; Malabag (1/2) 64'	Report	Tries: Woods 31'; Pakulis 60'; Goals: Frananda (2/2) 31', 62'

Headingley Stadium, Leeds
Attendance: 8,621
Referee: Geoffrey Poumes (France)
Touch judges: Aaron Moore (England), James Vella (England)
Player of the Match: Martha Molowia (Papua New Guinea)

Team details
Papua New Guinea		Position	Canada
Name	Number	Position	Number	Name
Martha Molowia	17	Fullback	5	Karina Gauto
Lisa Marie Alu	23	Wing	20	Lauren Mueller
Shellie Long	4	Centre	4	Ferris Sandboe
Belinda Gwasamun	3	Centre	3	Petra Woods
Anika Butler	2	Wing	1	Dani Frananda
Sera Koroi	6	Stand off/Five eighth	10	Laura Mariu
Lilah Malabag	7	Scrum half/Half back	7	Sabrina McDaid
Elsie Albert	8	Prop forward	8	Kirsty Sargent
Therese Aiton	9	Hooker	6	Alanna Fittes
Gloria Kaupa	10	Prop forward	24	Elizabeth Steele
Emily Veivers	11	Second row	11	Gabrielle Hindley
Essay Banu	12	Second row	14	Maddy Aberg
Ua Ravu	14	Loose forward/Lock forward	13	Megan Pakulis
Jessikah Reeves	13	Interchange	9	Natalie Tam
Bertishba Awoi	15	Interchange	12	Sarah Maguire
Michelle John	16	Interchange	22	Ada Jane Okonkwo
Talitha Kunjil	19	Interchange	19	Jade Menin
Ben Jeffries		Coach		Mike Castle

5 November 2022
12:00 GMT (UTC±00:00)

England	54–4	Canada
Tries: Burke (2) 4', 67'; Dodd (2) 17', 26'; Wilson 20'; Goldthorp 33'; Roche 35'; Stanley (3) 41', 44', 60'; Roberts 52'; Goals: Stanley (5/11) 21', 27', 36' 42' 61'	Report	Tries: Woods 47'

DW Stadium, Wigan
Attendance: 23,179 (Note: Match was a double header with the men's game between England and Papua New Guinea)
Referee: Paki Parkinson (New Zealand)
Touch judges: James Vella (England), Liam Rush (England)
Player of the Match: Vicky Molyneux (England)

Team details
England		Position	Canada
Name	Number	Position	Number	Name
Fran Goldthorp	30	Fullback	5	Karina Gauto
Georgia Wilson	20	Wing	2	Brittany Jones
Tara Stanley	1	Centre	14	Maddy Aberg
Carrie Roberts	23	Centre	3	Petra Woods
Leah Burke	5	Wing	20	Lauren Mueller
Georgia Roch	6	Stand off/Five eighth	10	Laura Mariu
Courtney Winfield-Hill	7	Scrum half/Half back	7	Sabrina McDaid
Shona Hoyle	17	Prop forward	8	Kirsty Sargent
Keara Bennett	21	Hooker	9	Natalie Tam
Paige Travis	19	Prop forward	22	Ada Jane Okonkwo
Hollie Dodd	11	Second row	11	Gabrielle Hindley
Emily Rudge	12	Second row	16	Rachel Choboter
Vicky Molyneux	14	Loose forward/Lock forward	13	Megan Pakulis
Vicky Whitfield	15	Interchange	18	Alix Evans
Beth Stott	16	Interchange	24	Elizabeth Steele
Zoe Hornby	24	Interchange	17	Brittany Douglas
Danielle Anderson	10	Interchange	23	Zoey Siciliano
Craig Richards		Coach		Mike Castle

5 November 2022
17:00 GMT (UTC±00:00)

Papua New Guinea	70–0	Brazil
Tries: Gwasamun (4) 2', 27', 51', 59'; Moxon (2) 11', 54'; Butler 16'; Albert 42'; Reeves 45'; Koroi 48'; Joe 66'; Molowia 69'; Malabag 72'; Aiton 75'; Goals: Malabag (7/14) 28', 44', 46', 49', 61', 70', 73'	Report

MKM Stadium, Hull
Attendance: 7,080 (Note: Match was a double header with the men's game between New Zealand and Fiji)
Referee: Ben Casty (France)
Touch judges: Geoffrey Poumes (France), Dean Bowmer (England)
Player of the Match: Belinda Gwasamun (Papua New Guinea)

Team details
Papua New Guinea		Position	Brazil
Name	Number	Position	Number	Name
Martha Molowia	17	Fullback	1	Adriana Felix
Tara Moxon	1	Wing	22	Edna Santini
Shae-Yvonne De La Cruz	5	Centre	3	Leticia Medeiros
Belinda Gwasamun	3	Centre	12	Amanda Welter
Anika Butler	2	Wing	18	Natalia Momberg
Sera Koroi	6	Stand off/Five eighth	6	Giovana Moura
Lilah Malabag	7	Scrum half/Half back	5	Byanca Santa Rita
Elise Albert (c)	8	Prop forward	8	Franciny Amaral
Shirley Joe	22	Hooker	9	Patricia Bodeman
Bertshiba Awoi	15	Prop forward	10	Paula Casemiro
Essay Banu	12	Second row	11	Patricia Oliveira
Carol Humeu	21	Second row	17	Ana Loschi De Quadros
Jessika Reeves	13	Loose forward/Lock forward	16	Brena Prioste
Lia Ravu	14	Interchange	14	Giovanna Barth
Veronica Waula	18	Interchange	15	Franciele Barros
Therese Aiton	9	Interchange	21	Ellen Trindade
Gloria Kaupa	10	Interchange	17	Pamela Silva
Ben Jeffries		Coach		Paul Grundy

9 November 2022
17:00 GMT (UTC±00:00)

Canada	22–16	Brazil
Tries: Sandboe 25'; Maguire 29'; Pakulis 59'; Fittes 79'; Goals: Frananda (3/4) 31', 60', 80'	Report	Tries: Amaral 7'; Santini 44'; Bodeman 73'; Goals: Graf (2/3) 7', 75'

Headingley Stadium, Leeds
Attendance: 5,471
Referee: Michael Smaill (England)
Touch judges: Dean Bowmer (England), Geoffrey Poumes (France)

Team details
Canada		Position	Brazil
Name	Number	Position	Number	Name
Petra Woods	3	Fullback	18	Natalia Momberg
Ferris Sandboe	4	Wing	22	Edna Santini
Dani Frananda	1	Centre	3	Leticia Medeiros
Nina Bui	15	Centre	12	Amanda Welter
Lauren Mueller	20	Wing	4	Danielle Soares
Laura Mariu	10	Stand off/Five eighth	6	Giovanna Moura
Sabrina McDaid	7	Scrum half/Half back	7	Maria Graf
Ada Jane Okonkwo	22	Prop forward	8	Franciny Amaral
Alanna Fittes	6	Hooker	9	Patricia Bodeman
Elizabeth Steele	24	Prop forward	10	Paula Casemiro
Gabrielle Hindley	11	Second row	11	Patricia Oliveria
Maddy Aberg	14	Second row	17	Ana Loschi De Quadros
Megan Pakulis	13	Loose forward/Lock forward	16	Brena Prioste
Natasha Naismith	21	Interchange	2	Tati Fernandes
Kristy Sargent	8	Interchange	13	Barbara Leal
Sarah Maguire	12	Interchange	15	Franciele Barros
Jade Menin	19	Interchange	23	Natalia Jonck
Mike Castle		Coach		Paul Grundy

9 November 2022
19:30 GMT (UTC±00:00)

England	42–4	Papua New Guinea
Tries: Burke (3) 24', 46', 64'; Hardcastle (2) 28', 78'; Stanley 37'; Whitfield 52'; Beevers 75'; Goals: Stanley (5/8)	Report	Tries: Molowia 4'

Headingley Stadium, Leeds
Attendance: 5,471
Referee: Ben Casty (France)
Touch judges: Rochelle Tamarua (New Zealand), Aaron Moore (England)
Player of the Match: Jodie Cunningham (England)

Team details
England		Position	Papua New Guinea
Name	Number	Position	Number	Name
Fran Goldthorp	3	Fullback	17	Martha Molowia
Caitlin Beevers	2	Wing	23	Lisa Marie Alu
Tara-Jane Stanley	1	Centre	4	Shellie Long
Amy Hardcastle	4	Centre	3	Belinda Gwasamun
Leah Burke	5	Wing	2	Anika Butler
Georgia Roche	6	Stand off/Five eighth	6	Sera Koroi
Courtney Winfield-Hill	7	Scrum half/Half back	7	Lilah Malabag
Shona Hoyle	17	Prop forward	8	Elsie Albert
Tara Jones	9	Hooker	22	Shirley Joe
Olivia Wood	18	Prop forward	10	Gloria Kaupa
Hollie Dodd	11	Second row	11	Emily Veivers
Emily Rudge	12	Second row	12	Essay Banu
Jodie Cunningham	13	Loose forward/Lock forward	13	Jessikah Reeves
Vicky Whitfield	15	Interchange	14	Ua Ravu
Keara Bennett	21	Interchange	21	Carol Humeu
Paige Travis	19	Interchange	16	Michelle John
Grace Field	8	Interchange	5	Shae Yvonne De La Cru
Craig Richards		Coach		Ben Jeffries

=== Group B ===
All six of the Group B fixtures were played at the York Community Stadium in York.

Pos	Team	Pld	W	D	L	PF	PA	PD	Pts	Qualification
1	Australia	3	3	0	0	176	8	+168	6	Advance to knockout stage
2	New Zealand	3	2	0	1	88	14	+74	4	Advance to knockout stage
3	Cook Islands	3	1	0	2	30	126	−96	2	
4	France	3	0	0	3	18	164	−146	0	

Source: BBC Sport

2 November 2022
17:00 GMT (UTC±00:00)

New Zealand	46–0	France
Tries: Bartlett 24'; Nicholls 29'; Hall 33'; Murdoch-Masila (2) 39', 76'; Vaha'akolo (2) 42', 56'; P. McGregor 50'; Parker 79'; Goals: Nicholls (1/2) 52'; Clark (4/7) 30', 34', 77', 80'	Report

York Community Stadium, York
Attendance: 3,091
Referee: Ben Thaler (England)
Touch judges: Neil Horton (England), Liam Rush (England)
Player of the Match: Apii Nicholls-Pualau (New Zealand)

Team details
New Zealand		Position	France
Name	Number	Position	Number	Name
Apii Nicholls-Pualau	1	Fullback	5	Manon Samarra
Katelyn Vaha'akolo	2	Wing	23	Margot Canal
Shanice Parker	21	Centre	4	Laureane Biville
Page McGregor	4	Centre	19	Zoe Pastre Courtine
Madison Bartlett	5	Wing	2	Cristina Song-Puche
Autumn-Rain Stephens-Daly	3	Stand off/Five eighth	6	Elisa Ciria
Raecene McGregor	7	Scrum half/Half back	7	Alice Varela
Mya Hill-Moana	20	Prop forward	9	Cyndia Mansard
Krystal Rota	9	Hooker	14	Fanny Ramos
Annetta Nu'Uausala	10	Prop forward	10	Gaelle Alvherne
Roxy Murdoch-Masila	11	Second row	1	Elisa Akpa
Amber Hall	12	Second row	12	Perrine Monsterrat
Georgia Hale	13	Loose forward/Lock forward	13	Leila Bessahli
Nita Maynard	14	Interchange	16	Elodie Pacull
Charlotte Scanlan	16	Interchange	17	Mailys Borak
Otesa Pule	18	Interchange	11	Tallis Kuresa
Brianna Clark	23	Interchange	21	Dorine Samarra
Ricky Henry		Coach		Vincent Baloup

2 November 2022
19:30 GMT (UTC±00:00)

Australia	74–0	Cook Islands
Tries: Pelite (3) 3', 25', 70'; Johnston 9'; Aiken (2) 14', 72'; Bremmer (4) 21', 44', 60', 63'; Ciesiolka 30'; Robinson 33', 57'; Fuimaono 54'; Goals: Brown (6/9) 10', 16', 23', 31', 65', 70'; Wheeler (3/3) 55', 58', 61'	Report

York Community Stadium, York
Attendance: 3,091
Referee: Michael Smaill (England)
Touch judges: Warren Turley (England), Wyatt Raymond (Australia)
Player of the Match: Sam Bremner (Australia)

Team details
Australia		Position	Cook Islands
Name	Number	Position	Number	Name
Samantha Bremner (c)	2	Fullback	1	Mackenzie Wiki
Julia Robinson	5	Wing	2	Beniamina Koiatu
Isabelle Kelly	5	Centre	3	Kerehitina Matua
Shenae Ciesiolka	19	Centre	5	Kiana Takairangi,
Evania Pelite	17	Wing	4	Daimzel Rongokea,
Tarryn Aiken	24	Stand off/Five eighth	6	Kimiora Breayley-Nati (c)
Ali Brigginshaw	12	Scrum half/Half back	7	Chantay Kiria-Ratu
Caitlan Johnston	3	Prop forward	8	Karol Tanevesi
Lauren Brown	20	Hooker	9	Tetuanui Dean
Shannon Mato	14	Prop forward	10	April Ngatupuna
Kezie Apps	23	Second row	16	Alekermay Tuaana
Olivia Kernick	1	Second row	17	Lavinia Kitai
Simaima Taufa	4	Loose forward/Lock forward	21	Anneka Stephens
Holli Wheeler	9	Interchange	14	Jazmon Tupou-Witchman
Kennedy Cherrington	16	Interchange	15	Toka Natua
Yasmin Clydsdale	18	Interchange	18	Charlize Tumu-Makara
Taliah Fuimaono	19	Interchange	19	Tehinnah-Leal Tatuava
Brad Donald		Coach		Rusty Matua

6 November 2022
17:00 GMT (UTC±00:00)

New Zealand	34–4	Cook Islands
Tries: McGregor 10'; Rota 15'; Hall 31'; Albert-Jones 54'; Hufanga (2) 59', 72'; Nu'uausala 79'; Goals: Albert-Jones (1/4) 54'; Clark (3/3) 33', 74', 80'	Report	Tries: Wiki 67'

York Community Stadium, York
Attendance: 3,006
Referee: Michael Smaill (England)
Touch judges: James Vella (England), Liam Rush (England)
Player of the Match: Raecene McGregor (New Zealand)

Team details
New Zealand		Position	Cook Islands
Name	Number	Position	Number	Name
Shanice Parker	21	Fullback	16	Alekermay Tuaana
Madison Barlett	5	Wing	1	Mackenzie Wiki
Page McGregor	4	Centre	4	Daimzel Rongokea
Hailee-Jay Ormond-Maunsell	19	Centre	18	Charlize Tumu-Makara
Mele Hufanga	24	Wing	19	Tehinnah-Leal Tatuava
Laishon Albert-Jones	6	Stand off/Five eighth	6	Kimiora Breayley-Nati
Raecene McGregor	7	Scrum half/Half back	3	Kerehitina Matua
Mya Hill-Moana	8	Prop forward	8	Karol Tanevesi
Annetta Nu'uausala	9	Hooker	21	Anneka Stephens
Krystal Rota	10	Prop forward	10	April Ngatupuna
Amber Hall	12	Second row	14	Jazmon Tupou-Witchman
Otesa Pule	18	Second row	17	Lavinia Kitai
Charlotte Scanlan	16	Loose forward/Lock forward	13	Elianna Walton
Nita Maynard	14	Interchange	11	Moniqca Mo'Ale
Christyl Stowers	17	Interchange	12	Kennedy Harrison-Vahua
Crystal Tamarua	20	Interchange	22	Maleyna Hunapo (yellow card) 63' to 73'
Brianna Clark	23	Interchange	11	Terehia Matua
Ricky Henry		Coach		Rusty Matua

6 November 2022
19:30 GMT (UTC±00:00)

Australia	92–0	France
Tries: Ciesiolka 3'; Chapman (3) 6', 12', 63'; Sergis (4) 9', 17', 37', 42'; Aiken 14'; Tonegato 21'; Harden 27'; Pelite (2) 35', 79'; Robinson (3) 46', 67', 74'; Kernick 55'; Goals: Brown (10/13); Wheeler (1/2); Aiken (1/2)	Report

York Community Stadium, York
Attendance: 3,006
Referee: Rochelle Tamarua (New Zealand)
Touch judges: Neil Horton (England), Aaron Moore (England)
Player of the Match: Tarryn Aiken (Australia)

Team details
Australia		Position	France
Name	Number	Position	Number	Name
Emma Tonegato	6	Fullback	5	Manon Samarra
Julia Robinson	10	Wing	23	Margot Canal
Jessica Sergis	11	Centre	20	Anais Fourcroy
Jaime Chapman	15	Centre	4	Laureane Biville
Shenae Ciesiolka	17	Wing	15	Cloe Guillerot
Taliah Fuimaono	19	Stand off/Five eighth	6	Elisa Ciria
Tarryn Aiken	12	Scrum half/Half back	7	Alice Varela
Tallisha Harden	7	Prop forward	9	Cyndia Mansard
Lauren Brown	14	Hooker	14	Fanny Ramos
Kennedy Cherrington	16	Prop forward	8	Jeanne Bernard
Yasmin Clydsdale	18	Second row	1	Elisa Akpa
Shaylee Bent	13	Second row	12	Perrine Monsterrat
Keilee Joseph	21	Loose forward/Lock forward	21	Dorine Samarra
Shannon Mato	23	Interchange	24	Lise Michel
Holli Wheeler	9	Interchange	16	Elodie Pacull
Olivia Kernick	22	Interchange	17	Mailys Borak
Evania Pelite	24	Interchange	11	Tallis Kuresa
Brad Donald		Coach		Vincent Baloup

10 November 2022
17:00 GMT (UTC±00:00)

France	18–26	Cook Islands
Tries: Bianchini 27'; Ciria (2) 48', 76'; Song-Puche 65'; Goals: Ciria (1/4)	Report	Tries: Ngatupuna 19'; T. Matua 30'; Wiki 42'; Tuaana 61'; Dean 73'; Goals: K. Matua (3/5)

York Community Stadium, York
Attendance: 3,370
Referee: Ben Thaler (England)
Touch judges: Belinda Sharpe (Australia), Marcus Griffiths (England)

Team details
France		Position	Cook Islands
Name	Number	Position	Number	Name
Cloe Guillerot	15	Fullback	21	Alekermay Tuaana
Cristina Song-Puche	2	Wing	24	Mackenzie Wiki
Melanie Bianchini	3	Centre	22	Jazmon Tupou-Witchman
Laureane Biville	4	Centre	20	Charlize Tumu-Makara
Anaelle Meunier	18	Wing	15	Daimzel Rongokea
Elisa Ciria	6	Stand off/Five eighth	10	Kerehitina Matua
Alice Varela	7	Scrum half/Half back	21	Anneka Stephens
Gaelle Alvherne	10	Prop forward	18	Karol-Ann Tanevesi
Fanny Ramos	14	Hooker	4	Tetuanui Dean
Cyndia Mansard	9	Prop forward	14	April Ngatupuna
Elisa Akpa	1	Second row	12	Moniqca Mo'ale
Perrine Monsarrat	12	Second row	8	Lavinia Kitai
Dorine Samarra	21	Loose forward/Lock forward	23	Elianna Walton
Jeanne Bernard	8	Interchange	5	Kennedy Harrison-Vahua
Mailys Borak	17	Interchange	3	Mireka Dean
Zoe Pastre Courtine	19	Interchange	2	Erikana Dean
Manon Samarra	5	Interchange	11	Terehia Matua
Vincent Baloup		Coach		Rusty Matua

10 November 2022
19:30 GMT (UTC±00:00)

Australia	10–8	New Zealand
Tries: Aiken 20'; Robinson 62'; Goals: Brigginshaw (1/1) 22'; Brown (0/1)	Report	Tries: Nicholls-Pualau 30'; Stephens-Daly 55'; Goals: Clark (0/2)

York Community Stadium, York
Attendance: 3,370
Referee: Todd Smith (Australia)
Touch judges: Paki Parkinson (New Zealand), Robert Hicks (England)

Team details
Australia		Position	New Zealand
Name	Number	Position	Number	Name
Samantha Bremner	2	Fullback	1	Apii Nicholls
Julia Robinson	10	Wing	3	Autumn-Rain Stephens-Daly
Jessica Sergis	11	Centre	24	Mele Hufanga
Isabelle Kelly	5	Centre	4	Page McGregor
Jaime Chapman	15	Wing	2	Katelyn Vaha'akolo
Tarryn Aiken	12	Stand off/Five eighth	15	Kararaina Wira-Kohu
Ali Brigginshaw	3	Scrum half/Half back	7	Raecene McGregor
Shannon Mato	23	Prop forward	23	Brianna Clark
Keeley Davis	8	Hooker	9	Krystal Rota
Caitlan Johnston	20	Prop forward	10	Annetta Nu'uausala
Kezie Apps	1	Second row	11	Roxy Murdoch-Masila
Yasmin Clydsdale	18	Second row	12	Amber Hall
Simaima Taufa	4	Loose forward/Lock forward	13	Georgia Hale
Kennedy Cherrington	16	Interchange	14	Nita Maynard
Shaylee Bent	13	Interchange	8	Mya Hill-Moana
Lauren Brown	14	Interchange	18	Otesa Pule
Emma Tonegato	6	Interchange	17	Christyl Stowers
Brad Donald		Coach		Ricky Henry

== Knockout stage ==
Semi-finals
14 November – York
Australia	82
Papua New Guinea	0
14 November – York
England	6
New Zealand	20

Final
19 November – Manchester
Australia	54
New Zealand	4

=== Semi-finals ===
The semi-finals were played as a double-header at the York Community Stadium, York on 14 November 2022.

14 November 2022
17:00 GMT (UTC±00:00)

Australia	82–0	Papua New Guinea
Tries: Davis 10'; Kelly (3) 15', 17', 37'; Bent 22'; Pelite 25'; Ciesiolka (2) 28', 46'; Kernick 34'; Sergis 42'; Harden 49'; Tonegato (3) 52', 56', 75'; Chapman 66'; Goals: Brown (9/13) 11', 23', 36', 38', 43', 47', 50', 53', 58'; Brigginshaw (2/2) 67', 76'	Report

York Community Stadium, York
Attendance: 7,139
Referee: Belinda Sharpe (Australia)
Touch judges: Rochelle Tamarua (New Zealand), Marcus Griffiths (England

Team details
Australia		Position	Papua New Guinea
Name	Number	Position	Number	Name
Emma Tonegato	3	Fullback	5	Shae Yvonne De La Cruz
Evania Pelite	2	Wing	2	Anika Butler
Isabelle Kelly	1	Centre	4	Shellie Long
Jaime Chapman	4	Centre	3	Belinda Gwasamun
Shenae Ciesiolka	5	Wing	17	Martha Molowia
Taliah Fuimaono	6	Stand off/Five eighth	6	Sera Koroi
Lauren Brown	7	Scrum half/Half back	7	Lilah Malabag
Holli Wheeler	17	Prop forward	8	Elsie Albert
Keeley Davis	9	Hooker	9	Therese Aiton
Tallisha Harden	18	Prop forward	10	Gloria Kaupa
Shaylee Bent	14	Second row	15	Bertshiba Awoi
Olivia Kernick	12	Second row	12	Essay Banu
Ali Brigginshaw	13	Loose forward/Lock forward	13	Jessikah Reeves
Jessica Sergis	15	Interchange	19	Talitha Kunjil
Yasmin Clydsdale	21	Interchange	11	Emily Veivers
Samantha Bremner	11	Interchange	16	Michelle John Ikupu
Keilee Joseph	8	Interchange	21	Carol Humeu
Brad Donald		Coach		Rusty Matua

14 November 2022
19:30 GMT (UTC±00:00)

England	6–20	New Zealand
Tries: Goldthorp 5'; Goals: Stanley (1/1) 6'	Report	Tries: Hufanga 16'; R. McGregor 29'; Pule 47'; Clark 52'; Goals: Clark (0/2); Nicholls-Pualau (2/2) 48', 53'

York Community Stadium, York
Attendance: 7,139
Referee: Kasey Badger (Australia)
Touch judges: Geoffrey Poumes (France), Robert Hicks (England)
Player of the Match: Mele Hufanga (New Zealand)

Team details
England		Position	New Zealand
Name	Number	Position	Number	Name
Fran Goldthorp	3	Fullback	1	Apii Nicholls-Pualau
Caitlin Beevers	2	Wing	2	Katelyn Vaha'akolo
Tara-Jane Stanley	1	Centre	24	Mele Hufanga
Amy Hardcastle	4	Centre	4	Page McGregor
Leah Burke	5	Wing	5	Madison Bartlett
Georgia Roche	6	Stand off/Five eighth	15	Abigail Roache
Courtney Winfield-Hill	7	Scrum half/Half back	7	Raecene McGregor
Shona Hoyle	17	Prop forward	23	Brianna Clark
Tara Jones	9	Hooker	9	Krystal Rota
Olivia Wood	18	Prop forward	10	Annetta Nu'Uausala
Vicky Molyneux	14	Second row	11	Roxy Murdoch-Masila
Emily Rudge	12	Second row	12	Amber Hall
Jodie Cunningham	13	Loose forward/Lock forward	13	Georgia Hale
Vicky Whitfield	15	Interchange	14	Nita Maynard
Keara Bennett	21	Interchange	8	Mya Hill-Moana
Hollie Dodd	11	Interchange	18	Otesa Pule
Grace Field	8	Interchange	16	Charlotte Scanlan
Craig Richards		Coach		Ricky Henry

=== Final ===
The final was played at Old Trafford, Manchester on 19 November 2022 as a double-header with the final of the men's tournament.

19 November 2022
13:15 GMT (UTC±00:00)

Australia	54–4	New Zealand
Tries: Sergis (2) 4', 51'; Kelly (2) 14', 35'; Robinson 26'; Tonegato 48'; Aiken 56'; Cherrington (2) 66', 69'; Pelite 72'; Goals: Brigginshaw (2/5) 6', 70'; Brown (5/5) 36', 49', 52', 57', 67'	Report	Tries: Bartlett 64'; Goals: R. McGregor (0/1)

Old Trafford, Manchester
Attendance: 67,502
Referee: Belinda Sharpe (Australia)
Touch judges: Wyatt Raymond (Australia), Darian Furner (Australia)

Team details
Australia		Position	New Zealand
Name	Number	Position	Number	Name
Samantha Bremner	2	Fullback	1	Apii Nicholls-Pualau
Julia Robinson	10	Wing	3	Autumn-Rain Stephens-Daly
Jessica Sergis	11	Centre	24	Mele Hufanga
Isabelle Kelly	5	Centre	4	Page McGregor
Evania Pelite	24	Wing	5	Madison Bartlett
Tarryn Aiken	12	Stand off/Five eighth	15	Abigail Roache
Ali Brigginshaw	3	Scrum half/Half back	7	Raecene McGregor
Shannon Mato	23	Prop forward	23	Brianna Clark
Keeley Davis	8	Hooker	9	Krystal Rota
Kennedy Cherrington	16	Prop forward	10	Annetta Nu'uausala
Yasmin Clydsdale	18	Second row	11	Roxy Murdoch-Masila
Kezie Apps	1	Second row	12	Amber Hall
Simaima Taufa	4	Loose forward/Lock forward	13	Georgia Hale
Lauren Brown	14	Interchange	14	Nita Maynard
Emma Tonegato	6	Interchange	8	Mya Hill-Moana
Shaylee Bent	13	Interchange	18	Otesa Pule
Caitlan Johnston	20	Interchange	17	Christyl Stowers
Brad Donald		Coach		Ricky Henry

== Team of the Tournament ==
Between the Semi-finals and final the RLWC2021 organisers announced the team of the tournament.

#	Position	Player	M	T	G	Pts
1	Fullback	Apii Nicholls	3	2	3	14
2	Wing	Tara-Jane Stanley	4	6	19	62
3	Centre	Mele Hufanga	3	3	0	12
4	Centre	Isabelle Kelly	3	3	0	12
5	Wing	Evania Pelite	3	6	0	24
6	Five-eighth	Tarryn Aiken	3	4	1	18
7	Halfback	Raecene McGregor	4	3	0	12
8	Prop	Elsie Albert	4	1	0	4
9	Hooker	Lauren Brown	4	0	25	50
10	Prop	Vicky Whitfield	4	1	0	4
11	Second-row	Vicky Molyneux	3	0	0	0
12	Second-row	Amber Hall	4	2	0	8
13	Lock	Megan Pakulis	3	2	0	8
14	interchange	Franciny Amaral	3	1	0	4
15	interchange	Courtney Winfield-Hill	4	3	0	12
16	interchange	Emma Tonegato	3	4	0	16
17	interchange	Annetta Nu'uausala	4	1	0	4

== See also ==
- 2021 Men's Rugby League World Cup
- 2021 Wheelchair Rugby League World Cup
- 2021 Festival of World Cups
- Legacy of the 2021 Rugby League World Cup
