= Ben Murdoch-Masila =

Tonga international rugby league footballer

Ben Murdoch Masila
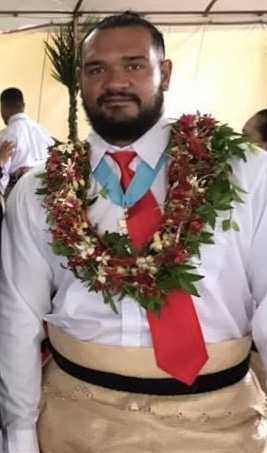

Personal information
- Full name: Benjieman Murdoch-Masila
- Born: 7 February 1991 (age 35) Auckland, New Zealand
- Height: 186 cm (6 ft 1 in)
- Weight: 118 kg (18 st 8 lb)

Playing information
- Position: Second-row, Prop, Lock
Club
Years	Team	Pld	T	G	FG	P
2010–13	Wests Tigers	52	7	0	0	28
2014–15	Penrith Panthers	6	0	0	0	0
2016–17	Salford Red Devils	60	22	0	0	88
2018–20	Warrington Wolves	68	21	0	0	84
2021–22	New Zealand Warriors	27	6	0	0	24
2023–25	St. George Illawarra	36	0	0	0	0
	Total	249	56	0	0	224
Representative
Years	Team	Pld	T	G	FG	P
2013–22	Tonga	16	1	0	0	4
- Source: As of 21 August 2025
- Spouse: Roxette Murdoch

Ben Murdoch-Masila (born 7 February 1991) is a retired Tonga international rugby league footballer who last played as a prop, second-row and lock for the St George Illawarra Dragons in the National Rugby League (NRL).

He played for the Wests Tigers and the Penrith Panthers in the NRL, and the Salford Red Devils and the Warrington Wolves in the Super League.

== Background ==
Murdoch-Masila was born in Otahuhu, New Zealand and is of Tongan descent.

== Playing career ==
Murdoch-Masila played junior football with Otahuhu Black. He undertook a scholarship with Wests Tigers at Keebra Park High School and was a member of the team that won the 2009 Arrive Alive Cup. Murdoch-Masila weighed 150 kg when he arrived at Keebra Park, dropping 40 kg before he joined the Wests Tigers NYC team.

Murdoch-Masila made his NRL debut in the first round of the 2010 NRL semi finals against the Sydney Roosters. He is one of very few players to have made his first appearance in a finals match.

In 2011, Murdoch-Masila made a further seven appearances, and may have made more if not for injuries. At the end of the season he was selected for the Junior Kiwis.

A regular on the bench in 2012, Murdoch-Masila played in 20 games for the season and scored five tries, including a double against Parramatta. He also signed an extension to stay with the club until the end of 2015, with coach Tim Sheens saying, "There is no doubt Ben has enormous talent and potential. He is a strike weapon and can become a top line player of the game with the right kind of commitment to his training regime."

Missing only one game, Murdoch-Masila was one of the most regular first grade players for Wests Tigers in 2013. He started the season playing from the reserve bench, but started in the back row in the last five games of the season. In April, Murdoch-Masila made his international debut, playing in the Pacific Rugby League International for the Tongan side that thrashed Samoa 36–4. He was chosen to represent Tonga in the 2013 World Cup, but a leg injury in his first hit-up of the tournament saw him take no further part.

On 30 April 2014, Murdoch-Masila signed a 1 1/2-year contract effective immediately with the Penrith Panthers, after being released from the final year and a half of his Wests Tigers contract. Murdoch-Masila was a cult hero at Warrington Wolves, and has his own terrace song; ”1,2,3,4 Party on, Ben Murdoch-Masila, Party on - he's a Tongan hero, Party on, he never gives the ball away-ay”. He played in the 2018 Challenge Cup Final defeat by the Catalans Dragons at Wembley Stadium. He played in the 2018 Super League Grand Final defeat by Wigan at Old Trafford. He played in the 2019 Challenge Cup Final victory over St Helens at Wembley Stadium. In round 1 of the 2021 NRL season, he made his club debut for the New Zealand Warriors in their 19–6 victory over the Gold Coast. He made a total of 11 appearances for the New Zealand club as they finished 15th on the table.

=== 2023 ===
On 1 January 2023, Murdoch-Masila signed a two-year contract with the St. George Illawarra Dragons. During round 2 of 2023 NRL season against the Gold Coast Titans, Murdoch-Masila made his club debut for the St. George Illawarra Dragons in the team's first win of the season against the Gold Coast. On 29 June 2023, Murdoch-Masila played his 100th game against the Cronulla-Sutherland Sharks with the club losing 16–52 in their biggest ever loss against their arch rivals. Murdoch-Masila played a total of 21 games for the club in the 2023 NRL season as they finished 16th on the table.

=== 2024 ===
Murdoch-Masila played 14 games for St. George Illawarra in the 2024 NRL season as the club finished 11th on the table.

=== 2025 ===
Murdoch-Masila signed on a development contract for the 2025 season. On 17 September, Murdoch-Masila confirmed he would retire from the NRL at the conclusion of the NRL season. On 28 September, he played in St. George Illawarra's 30-12 NSW Cup Grand Final loss to New Zealand.

== International career ==
On 2 May 2015, Murdoch-Masila played for Tonga in their Polynesian Cup clash with Pacific rivals Samoa. During the 2015 season, he did not play any NRL games for the Panthers and was not re-signed beyond 2015. On 17 October 2015, Murdoch-Masila played for Tonga in their Asia-Pacific Qualifier match against the Cook Islands for the 2017 Rugby League World Cup.

He played in every match of Tonga's historic charge to the semi-finals of the 2017 Rugby League World Cup, and set up a vital try in their shock win over New Zealand in the pool stage of the tournament.

== Statistics ==
Year	Team	Games	Tries	Pts
2010	Wests Tigers	2		
2011	Wests Tigers	7		
2012	Wests Tigers	20	5	20
2013	Wests Tigers	23	2	8
2014	Penrith Panthers	6		
2016	Salford Red Devils	32	6	24
2017	Salford Red Devils	28	16	64
2018	Warrington Wolves	26	11	44
2019	Warrington Wolves	28	6	24
2020	Warrington Wolves	14	4	16
2021	New Zealand Warriors	16	6	24
2022	New Zealand Warriors	11		
2023	St. George Illawarra Dragons	21		
2024	St. George Illawarra Dragons	14		
2025	St. George Illawarra Dragons	1		
	Totals	249	56	220
