= April Ngatupuna =

Cook Islands international rugby league player (born 2003)

Personal information
- Full name: April Ngatupuna
- Born: April 20, 2003 (age 23) Porirua, Wellington, New Zealand
- Height: 173 cm (5 ft 8 in)
- Weight: 108 kg (17 st 0 lb)

Playing information

Rugby league
- Position: Prop
Club
Years	Team	Pld	T	G	FG	P
2021–22	Gold Coast Titans	6	0	0	0	0
2023	North Qld Cowboys	8	1	0	0	4
	Total	14	1	0	0	4
Representative
Years	Team	Pld	T	G	FG	P
2022–25	Cook Islands	4	1	0	0	4

Rugby union
Club
Years	Team	Pld	T	G	FG	P
2024–	Queensland Reds
- Source: As of 18 October 2025

April Ngatupuna (born 20 April 2003) is a New Zealand professional rugby footballer who currently plays for Queensland Reds in Super W.

A prop or lock, she previously played for the Gold Coast Titans and North Queensland Cowboys in the NRL Women's Premiership.

== Background ==
Ngatupuna was born in Porirua, New Zealand and is of Cook Islander and Samoan descent. In Porirua, she played rugby union for the Northern United Rugby Club and attended Porirua College before moving to Brisbane, Queensland.

In Brisbane, Ngatupuna attended Marsden State High School and played junior rugby league for the Wests Panthers.

== Playing career ==
=== Early career ===
In 2021, Ngatupuna played for the Panthers in the QRL under-19 competition and for Valkyries in the QRL Women's Premiership. In June 2021, she represented Queensland under-19.

In June 2021, Ngatupuna made her Super W debut for the Queensland Reds in Round 1 of the 2021 Super W season in a 47–26 loss vs the NSW Waratahs.

In August 2021, she signed with the Gold Coast Titans.

=== 2022 ===
In Round 2 of the delayed 2021 NRL Women's season, Ngatupuna made her NRLW debut against the Sydney Roosters. Following the NRLW season, Ngatupuna played for the North Queensland Gold Stars in the QRL Women's Premiership, starting at prop in their Grand Final win over the Central Queensland Capras. In June, she represented Queensland under-19 for the second time.

Ngatupuna returned to the Titans for the 2022 NRL Women's season, playing just one game.

In November, Ngatupuna represented the Cook Islands at the Women's World Cup, playing three games and scoring a try in their 26–18 win over France.

=== 2023 ===
Ngatupuna began the 2023 season playing for the Souths Logan Magpies in the QRL Women's Premiership.

On 10 May, she signed a two-year contract with the North Queensland Cowboys.

In Round 1 of the 2023 NRL Women's season, she made her debut for the Cowboys, coming off the bench in a 16–6 loss to the Gold Coast Titans. In Round 3, she scored her first NRLW try in a 40–12 loss to the Brisbane Broncos.

=== 2024 ===
In 2024, Ngatupuna returned to rugby union, joining the Queensland Reds in the Super W. In October, Ngatupuna was selected to represent the Cook Islands in the 2024 Rugby League Pacific Championships.
