= Sera Koroi =

PNG international rugby league footballer (born 2002)

Personal information
- Born: 21 August 2002 (age 24) Darwin, Northern Territory, Australia
- Height: 162 cm (5 ft 4 in)
- Weight: 79 kg (12 st 6 lb)

Playing information
- Position: Lock, Five-eighth
Club
Years	Team	Pld	T	G	FG	P
2023	Nth Qld Cowboys	8	0	0	0	0
Representative
Years	Team	Pld	T	G	FG	P
2022–23	Papua New Guinea	5	1	0	0	4
2023	PNG PM's XIII	1	0	0	0	0
- Source: As of 30 July 2024

Sera Koroi (born 21 August 2002) is a professional rugby league footballer who previously played for the North Queensland Cowboys in the NRL Women's Premiership.

She represented Papua New Guinea at the 2021 Women's Rugby League World Cup.

== Background ==
Koroi was born in Darwin, Northern Territory and is of Papua New Guinean and Fijian descent. She played her junior league for the Redbank Plains Bears and attended Redbank Plains State High School.

== Playing career ==
In 2019, while playing for the Goodna Eagles, Koroi was selected to represent Papua New Guinea at the 2019 Rugby League World Cup 9s. She was later ruled ineligible to play as she hadn't turned 18.

In 2021, Koroi played for the Wests Panthers in the QRL Women's Premiership. In 2022, she played for the Souths Logan Magpies.

In November 2022, she represented Papua New Guinea at the Women's World Cup, playing four games and scoring a try in their 70–0 win over Brazil.

=== 2023 ===
On 24 April, Koroi signed with the North Queensland Cowboys on a one-year contract.

In Round 1 of the 2023 NRL Women's season, she made her NRLW debut, coming off the bench in a 16–6 loss to the Gold Coast Titans.

=== 2024 ===
In 2024, Koroi joined Sunnybank Rugby in the Queensland Women's Premier Rugby competition after leaving the Cowboys.
