= Cortez Te Pou =

New Zealand rugby league player

Personal information
- Born: 6 April 2001 (age 25) Hastings, New Zealand

Playing information

Rugby union
Representative
Years	Team	Pld	T	G	FG	P
202?	Hawke's Bay

Rugby league
- Position: Wing, centre
Club
Years	Team	Pld	T	G	FG	P
2023–	St George Illawarra	4	3	0	0	12
- Source: As of 3 November 2023

Cortez P Te Pou (born 6 April 2001) is a New Zealand rugby league footballer who plays as a winger or centre for the St George Illawarra Dragons in Australia's NRL Women's Premiership (NRLW).

== Background ==
Of Māori heritage, Te Pou attended Karamu High School in Hastings and was a Hawkes Bay representative in rugby union. She later moved to New South Wales, Australia, to play rugby league.

== Career ==
=== Early career ===
Te Pou played for the North Sydney Bears in the 2022 Harvey Norman NSW Women's Premiership, before playing for the Canterbury-Bankstown Bulldogs in the same competition the following season. Prior to the 2023 NRLW season, she signed for the St George Illawarra Dragons.

=== 2023 season ===
During her NRLW debut on 29 July, Te Pou scored two tries as the Dragons defeated the Parramatta Eels 38–12.
