= Jessikah Reeves =

PNG international rugby league footballer (born 2001)

Personal information
- Born: 24 May 2001 (age 25) Brisbane, Queensland, Australia
- Height: 170 cm (5 ft 7 in)
- Weight: 87 kg (13 st 10 lb)

Playing information
- Position: Lock, Prop
Club
Years	Team	Pld	T	G	FG	P
2023	Nth Qld Cowboys	5	0	0	0	0
2025	Wests Tigers	3	0	0	0	0
	Total	8	0	0	0	0
Representative
Years	Team	Pld	T	G	FG	P
2022–23	Papua New Guinea	5	1	0	0	4
2023	PNG PM's XIII	1	0	0	0	0
- Source: As of 16 November 2026

Jessikah Reeves (born 24 May 2001) is a professional rugby league footballer who last played as lock or prop for the Wests Tigers in the NRL Women's Premiership.

She represented Papua New Guinea at the 2021 Women's Rugby League World Cup.

== Background ==
Reeves was born in Brisbane, Queensland and is of Papua New Guinean descent. Her father is from Rabaul. She played her junior rugby league for Brothers Saint Brendan’s and attended St Thomas More College.

== Playing career ==
In 2019, while playing for Brothers St Brendans, Reeves represented Queensland under-18 in their 24–4 loss to New South Wales at North Sydney Oval.

In 2020 and 2021, she played for the Easts Tigers in the QRL Women's Premiership. In 2022, she played for the Souths Logan Magpies.

In November 2022, she represented Papua New Guinea at the Women's World Cup, playing four games and scoring a try in their 70–0 win over Brazil.

=== 2023 ===
In 2023, Reeves played for the Central Coast Roosters in the NSWRL Women's Premiership.

On 24 April, Reeves signed with the North Queensland Cowboys NRLW side.

In Round 4 of the 2023 NRL Women's season, she made her NRLW debut in the Cowboys' 16–12 win over the Wests Tigers. She left the Cowboys at the end of the 2023 season.
