= Paul Grundy =

American healthcare administrator

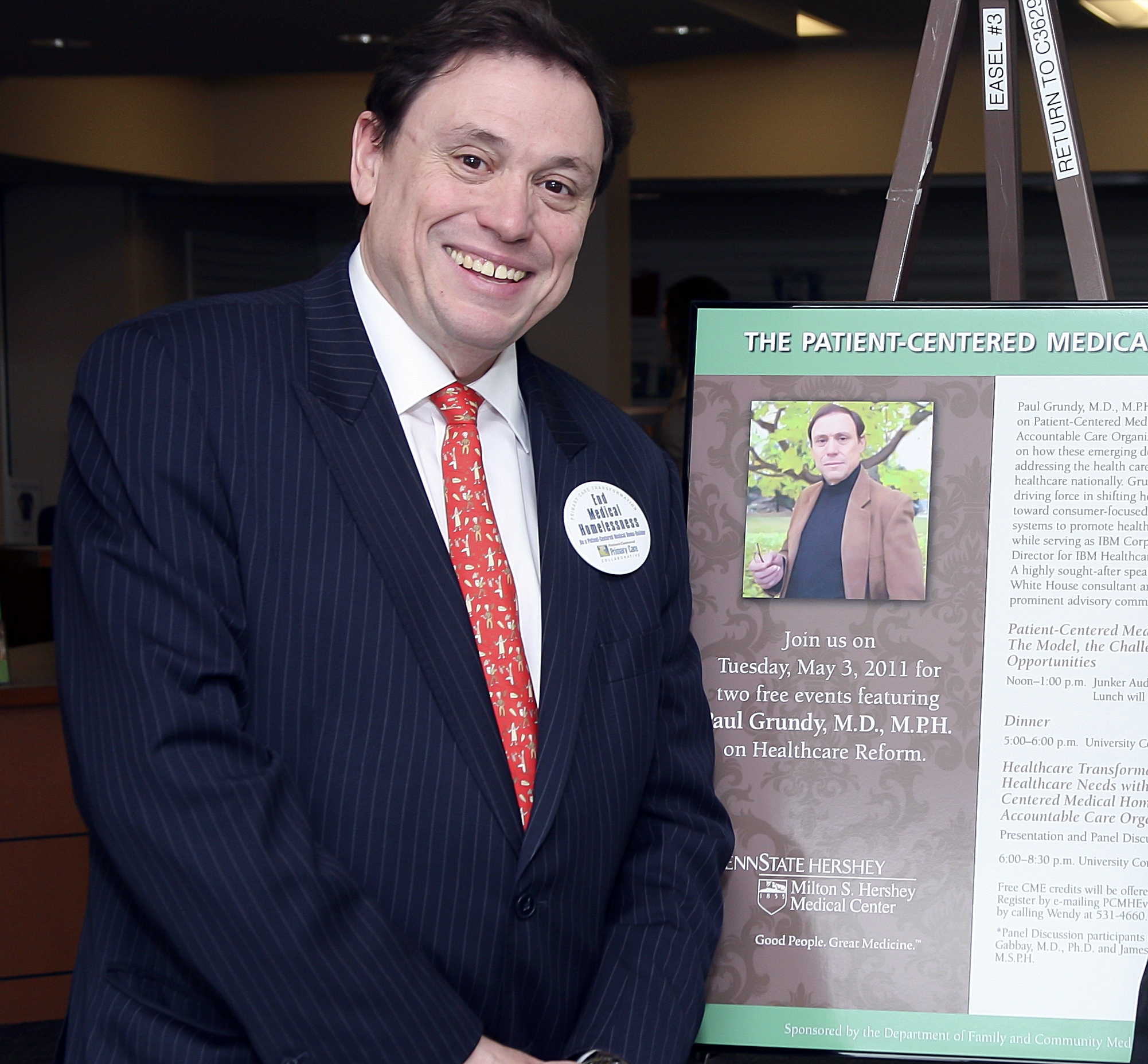
- Education: University of California, San Francisco; University of California, Berkeley
- Occupation: Physician

Paul Grundy is an American physician who led the Patient-Centered Primary Care Collaborative and contributed to the development of the medical home model. He is a member of the Institute of Medicine, a recipient of the Barbara Starfield Primary Care Leadership Award, and the 2012 National Committee for Quality Assurance (NCQA) Quality Award.

He served as IBM's Global Director of Healthcare Transformation and Chief Medical Officer of IBM's Healthcare and Life Science Industry. During his time at IBM, he worked with Randy MacDonald, Dan Pelino, Sean Hogan, and Nick Donofrio to promote the medical home model. Grundy developed strategies for shifting healthcare delivery towards consumer-focused, primary care based systems through the adoption of new philosophies, primary care pilot programs, incentives systems, and information technology. He is one of 38 IBM employees and the only physician selected into the IBM Industry Academy.

He is the founding president, and current chairman of the Patient-Centered Primary Care Collaborative. He is an adjunct professor at the University of Utah School of Medicine in the Departments of Family Medicine and Preventive Medicine and at the University of California San Francisco School of Medicine in the Department of Family and Community Medicine. He is a founding board member of the Get the Medications Right (GTMRx) Institute.

Grundy is a speaker whose work focuses on global healthcare transformation. His work primarily centers on advocating for the Patient-Centered Medical Home model and has been reported in Forbes, Economist, and the Huffington Post. Grundy spoke at TEDx Maastricht in a talk titled "Smarter healthcare by smarter use of data", and at the NHS Confederation conference and Foundation for Healthcare Transformation.

Grundy is the subject of a book on healthcare entitled Trusted Healers: Dr. Paul Grundy and the Global Healthcare Crusade by Dan Pelino with Bud Ramey, which was published in the fall of 2019. He is also a co-author of the book Lost and Found: A Consumer's Guide to Healthcare and The Familiar Physician by Dr. Peter B. Anderson, Bud Ramey, and Tom Emswiller. He is the featured physician in the 2015 book The Familiar Physician by Dr. Peter Anderson with Bud Ramey (co-author) and Tom Emswiller.

== Early life and education ==
Paul Grundy grew up in Sierra Leone, West Africa as the son of Quaker missionaries. He attended medical school at the University of California, San Francisco and earned his master's degree in public health at the University of California, Berkeley. Grundy performed his residency training at Johns Hopkins in preventive medicine and completed a post-doctoral fellowship at Johns Hopkins in occupational health in the international environment.

== Career ==
From 1979 to 1985, Paul Grundy was a medical officer in the U.S. Air Force, where he taught at the School of Aerospace Medicine, served as a flight surgeon, and was Chief of Hospital Services in Korea.

From 1985 to 1994, he was a regional medical officer and counselor of the embassy for medical affairs at the U.S. Department of State. As an Embassy Regional Medical Officer in 1985 he was stationed in Sanaa, Yemen due to the health risks in Yemen at the time. In this role, Grundy was responsible for leading the interactions between health and diplomacy, organizing activities such as the Clinton/Yeltsin health initiative, a $157 million bilateral initiative in Russia. He advised United States Ambassadors on healthcare programs for diplomatic posts. Working closely with Nelson Mandela and Helene Gayle and State Department Tex Harris, he set up the first U.S. policy and program addressing the HIV/AIDS epidemic in Africa. He worked to organize a Congressional fact-finding mission on the extent of the HIV/AIDS problem and drafted the first bill in Congress dealing with the HIV/AIDS epidemic in Africa. Grundy finished his career in the Department of State as a Minister Counselor.

From 1994 to 1997, Grundy was the medical director of Adventist Health Systems, Pennsylvania, and the medical director for the largest occupational medicine program in Berks County, Pennsylvania.

From 1997 to 2000, he was the corporate occupational medical director for International SOS, providing and coordinating care and medical assistance for multinational corporations.

Grundy has served as a director of the Accreditation Council for Graduate Medical Education, the body responsible for accrediting graduate medical training programs. Grundy is the president of the Patient-Centered Primary Care Collaborative, a coalition that was established with the involvement of IBM in early 2006 and is dedicated to advancing the Patient-Centered Medical Home model, an approach to primary care aimed at reforming healthcare delivery. It represents employers covering approximately 50 million people across the United States as well as physician groups representing more than 330,000 medical doctors, consumer organizations, and seven US health-benefits companies.

Following his retirement in 2018 from IBM, Grundy accepted a role with Innovaccer, Inc. of San Francisco.

Paul Grundy currently serves as president and a member of the board of directors for the Get the Medications Right (GTMRx) Institute and Foundation, a non-profit "dedicated to ensure appropriate and personalized use of medication and gene therapies."

== Awards ==
Grundy won the 2016 Barbara Starfield Primary Care Leadership Award for his work on the medical home model of care. He also won the Tim Ferriss Globetrotter Award 2010 from VT. He received the Defense Superior Service Award for his service addressing HIV/AIDS and The Defense Meritorious Service Medal.

Grundy was named an Ambassador for Healthcare Denmark in October 2014, a role in which he shares practices from the Danish Healthcare system with doctors in the United States and other parts of the world.
