= Rochelle Tamarua =

New Zealand rugby league referee

- Born: Auckland, New Zealand
- Occupation: Rugby League referee
- Relatives: Crystal Tamarua (sister)

Rochelle Tamarua is a New Zealand rugby league referee. Born in Auckland, New Zealand, Tamarua is of Maori and Cook Island descent.

Tamarua took up officiating rugby league in 2012 and within three years was a member of the New Zealand Rugby League (NZRL) officials team for test matches between Australia and New Zealand. She was the first woman to referee in the Fox Premiership, the leading domestic rugby league competition of the Auckland Rugby League.

In 2017 Tamarua took time away from refereeing to concentrate on running her own restaurant but returned to the sport in 2018. Continuing her career, she took a job with the Auckland Rugby League as the league's referees development officer. On the pitch she continued to referee domestic games and in 2022 took charge of several games in the National Rugby League (NRL) Women's National Championship in Australia. In August 2022 she became the first New Zealander to referee a match in the NRL Women's Premiership (NRLW).

Tamarua was one of only two NZRL referees selected for the officials team at the 2021 Rugby League World Cup in England. Her first world cup appearance will be as a touch judge in the match between Wales and Cook Islands on 18 October 2022.

After moving to Brisbane in 2023 to take up a post as officiating co-ordinator for the Queensland Rugby League, she became the first New Zealander to officiate in the Women’s State of Origin when she was one of the touch judges in the first match of the 2024 series.
