= Brianna Clark =

NZ international rugby league footballer

Personal information
- Born: 25 May 1995 (age 31) Brisbane, Queensland, Australia
- Height: 177 cm (5 ft 10 in)
- Weight: 89 kg (14 st 0 lb)

Playing information
- Position: Prop, Lock, Second-row
Club
Years	Team	Pld	T	G	FG	P
2020	New Zealand Warriors	2	0	0	0	0
2021	Gold Coast Titans	4	0	7	0	14
2022–	Brisbane Broncos	43	4	9	0	34
	Total	49	4	16	0	48
Representative
Years	Team	Pld	T	G	FG	P
2019	Prime Minister's XIII	1	0	0	0	0
2022–	New Zealand	5	1	7	0	18
2021–26	Queensland	3	0	0	0	0
- Source: RLP As of 1 November 2026

Brianna Clark (born 25 May 1995) is an Australian rugby league footballer who plays as a second-rower for the Brisbane Broncos in the NRL Women's Premiership and the Valleys Diehards in the QRL Women's Premiership.

She is a New Zealand, Prime Minister's XIII and Queensland representative.

== Background ==
Born in Brisbane, Clark was raised in Sarina, Queensland and attended Sarina State High School. Clark played soccer growing up, moving to the United States to play for Indian Hills Community College in Ottumwa, Iowa.

== Playing career ==
In 2017, Clark began playing rugby league for the Mackay Magpies. In 2019, Clark joined the Wests Panthers in South East Queensland Women's Division 1, starting at lock in their Grand Final win over the Burleigh Bears.

In May 2019, she represented Queensland Country at the Women's National Championships. On 11 October 2019, she represented the Prime Minister's XIII in their win over Fiji in Suva.

=== 2020 ===
Clark began the 2020 season playing for Wests in the QRL Women's Premiership. On 19 September, Clark joined the New Zealand Warriors NRL Women's Premiership team. In Round 2 of the 2020 NRL Women's season, Clark made her debut for the Warriors in a 14–28 loss to the Brisbane Broncos.

On 26 October, Clark was named in the Queensland squad for the 2020 Women's State of Origin but did not play in their 24–18 win over New South Wales.

=== 2021 ===
In 2021, Clark joined the Valleys Diehards in the QRL Women's Premiership.

She made her Queensland debut in Game 1 of the 2021 State of Origin on 25 June 2021 in the 8-6 win, coming off the bench.

=== 2022 ===
In October she was selected for the New Zealand squad at the delayed 2021 Women's Rugby League World Cup in England.
