= Mele Hufanga =

New Zealand & Tonga international rugby league & union player

- Born: 18 October 1994 (age 32) Tofua, Nukuʻalofa, Tonga
- Height: 183 cm (6 ft 0 in)
- Weight: 93 kg (14 st 9 lb)

Rugby union career
- Position: Centre
Provincial / State sides
Years	Team	Apps	(Points)
2011–2022	Auckland	48	(200)
2020	Counties Manukau	6	(5)
Super Rugby
Years	Team	Apps	(Points)
2022	Blues Women	2	(5)
International career
Years	Team	Apps	(Points)
2022	Tonga	3	(35)
- Rugby league career

Playing information
- Position: Wing, Centre
Club
Years	Team	Pld	T	G	FG	P
2022–23	Ponsonby Ponies		10	15	0	70
2023–25	Brisbane Broncos	32	24	0	0	96
2026–	New Zealand Warriors	7	4	0	0	16
	Total	39	38	15	0	182
Representative
Years	Team	Pld	T	G	FG	P
2020	Tonga	1	3	9	0	30
2022–26	New Zealand	17	11	0	0	44
2023	Auckland	1	1	0	0	4
- As of 17 November 2026

Mele Hufanga (born 18 October 1994) is a New Zealand rugby league player who plays at wing or centre for the New Zealand Warriors in the NRLW.

She has competed for Tonga internationally in rugby union, and for Tonga and New Zealand in rugby league. She played for the Blues Women in the inaugural season of Super Rugby Aupiki in 2022. She also made her test debut for the Tonga women's national rugby union team. She competed for the Kiwi Ferns at the delayed 2021 Women's Rugby League World Cup.

== Rugby union career ==
Hufanga scored 16 tries for Auckland in the 2015 Farah Palmer Cup season. Hufanga played for Counties Manukau in the 2020 season of the Farah Palmer Cup. In 2021 she played for the Moana Pasifika women's sevens team at the Takiwhitu Tutūru tournament in Wellington.

Hufanga signed with the Blues for the inaugural season of Super Rugby Aupiki. She scored a try in their match against Matatū in round 2 of the 2022 Super Rugby Aupiki season.

Hufanga captained Tonga at the 2022 Oceania Championship in New Zealand. She scored a brace of tries against Samoa in the opening match of the tournament. She scored again against Fiji in their 34–7 loss in the second game. She scored four tries in her sides 108–7 trouncing of Papua New Guinea in their final match.

== Rugby league career ==
Hufanga represented Tonga in a test match against Niue in 2020. She competed for the Kiwi Ferns at the delayed 2021 Women's Rugby League World Cup in England.

=== New Zealand Warriors Women ===
On 8 October 2025 it was reported that she had signed for New Zealand Warriors in the NRLW on a 2-year deal.
