= Crystal Tamarua =

New Zealand & Cook Islands international rugby league footballer

Personal information
- Born: 30 July 1995 (age 30) Auckland, New Zealand
- Height: 174 cm (5 ft 9 in)
- Weight: 89 kg (14 st 0 lb)

Playing information
- Position: Prop, Second-row, Halfback
Club
Years	Team	Pld	T	G	FG	P
2018–20	New Zealand Warriors	7	0	0	0	0
2021	Gold Coast Titans		0	0	0	0
2022	Brisbane Broncos	2	0	0	0	0
	Total	9	0	0	0	0
Representative
Years	Team	Pld	T	G	FG	P
2017–	New Zealand	7	1	0	0	4
2017	Cook Islands	3	0	0	0	0
2019	New Zealand 9s	3	0	0	0	0
2021	Māori All Stars	1	0	0	0	0
- Source: RLP As of 24 May 2026

Crystal Tamarua (born 30 July 1995) is a New Zealand rugby league footballer who last played as a prop for the Brisbane Broncos in the NRL Women's Premiership and Burleigh Bears in the QRL Women's Premiership.

She is a New Zealand and Cook Islands representative.

== Background ==
Born in Auckland, Tamarua played her junior rugby league for the Bay Roskill Vikings. Her sister, Rochelle, is a NZRL referee.

== Playing career ==
On 6 May 2017, while playing for the Richmond Roses, Tamarua made her Test debut for New Zealand, starting at second-row in a 4–16 loss to Australia.

In November 2017, Tamarua represented the Cook Islands at the 2017 Women's Rugby League World Cup.

On 1 August 2018, Tamarua joined the New Zealand Warriors NRL Women's Premiership team. In Round 2 of the 2018 NRL Women's season, she made her debut for the Warriors, starting at prop in a 10–22 loss to the St. George Illawarra Dragons.

In October 2019, she was a member of New Zealand's 2019 Rugby League World Cup 9s-winning squad.

In September 2020, Tamarua was one of five New Zealand-based Warriors' players to travel to Australia to play in the 2020 NRL Women's premiership. Due to COVID-19 restrictions, the players had to quarantine for 14 days on entering Australia and 14 days on return to New Zealand when the season was completed.

On 20 February 2021, she represented the Māori All Stars in their 24–0 win over the Indigenous All Stars. She joined the Burleigh Bears QRL Women's Premiership team for the 2021 season.

In October 2022 she was selected for the New Zealand squad at the delayed 2021 Women's Rugby League World Cup in England.
