= Roxette Murdoch =

New Zealand international rugby league footballer (born 1999)

Personal information
- Full name: Roxette Murdoch-Masila
- Born: 10 August 1992 (age 33) Auckland, New Zealand
- Height: 170 cm (5 ft 7 in)
- Weight: 86 kg (13 st 8 lb)

Playing information
- Position: Prop
Club
Years	Team	Pld	T	G	FG	P
2018	St Helens
2019–20	Warrington Wolves
2022	Brisbane Broncos	6	2	0	0	8
2022	Gold Coast Titans	2	0	0	0	0
2023	St George Illawarra Dragons	8	1	0	0	4
	Total	16	3	0	0	12
Representative
Years	Team	Pld	T	G	FG	P
2021–22	Māori All Stars	2	0	0	0	0
2022–	New Zealand	5	3	0	0	12
- Source: RLP As of 3 November 2023
- Spouse: Ben Murdoch-Masila

Roxette Murdoch (née Mura; born 10 August 1992) is a New Zealand rugby league footballer who last played as a prop for the St George Illawarra Dragons in the NRL Women's Premiership.

A Māori All Stars representative, she previously played for St Helens and the Warrington Wolves in the RFL Women's Super League.

== Background ==
Born in Auckland, New Zealand, Murdoch began playing rugby league and touch football in New Zealand before moving to the Gold Coast, Queensland. In 2011, she represented Australia Under-18 at the Youth Trans Tasman Touch series in Canberra.

She is married to New Zealand Warriors forward Ben Murdoch-Masila.

== Playing career ==
=== St Helens ===
In 2018, Murdoch signed with St Helens in the RFL Women's Super League. In 2019, she joined the Warrington Wolves and captained the side, leading them to promotion to the Super League. In May 2020, she was named in the England women's performance squad, later pledging her allegiance to England for the 2021 Women's Rugby League World Cup.

=== Central Coast Roosters ===
In 2021, Murdoch returned to Australia, joining the Central Coast Roosters in the NSWRL Women's Premiership. In February 2021, she represented the Māori All Stars in the NRL All Stars match.

=== Brisbane Broncos ===
In December 2021, Murdoch signed with the Brisbane Broncos. Before the 2021 NRL Women's season was postponed, she originally signed with the Sydney Roosters but instead joined the Broncos when her family relocated to Queensland. In February 2022, she again represented the Māori All Stars.

In Round 1 of the 2021 NRL Women's season, Murdoch made her debut for the Broncos, scoring a try in a win over the Sydney Roosters Women.

=== International ===
In October 2022 she was selected for the New Zealand squad at the delayed 2021 Women's Rugby League World Cup in England.
