= List of rugby league clubs in Queensland by competition =

This is a list of Queensland Rugby League clubs by competition. There are over 250 clubs in Queensland, across over 20 competitions administered by five regions.

== National Rugby League ==
Club	Location	Home ground(s)	First season
Brisbane Broncos	Brisbane, Queensland	Suncorp Stadium 52,500 (12 home games)	1988
Dolphins	Brisbane, Queensland	Suncorp Stadium 52,500 (7 home games) Moreton Daily Stadium 11,500 (4 home games)	2023
Gold Coast Titans	Gold Coast, Queensland	Cbus Super Stadium 27,500 (12 home games)	2007
North Queensland Cowboys	Townsville, Queensland	North Queensland Stadium 25,000 (12 home games)	1995

== State competitions ==
=== Queensland Cup and Hastings Deering Colts ===
Queensland Cup
Colours	Rugby league club	Est.	Joined*	City/town	State/territory	Stadium	Titles	Last	NRL affiliate
	Brisbane Tigers	1917	1996	Brisbane	Queensland	Langlands Park	0	-	Storm
	Burleigh Bears	1934	1997	Gold Coast	Queensland	Pizzey Park	4	2019	Titans
	Central Queensland Capras	1996	1996	Rockhampton	Queensland	Browne Park	0	-	Dolphins
	Ipswich Jets	1982	1996	Ipswich	Queensland	North Ipswich Reserve	1	2015	Roosters
	Mackay Cutters	2007	2008	Mackay	Queensland	BB Print Stadium Mackay	1	2013	Cowboys
	Northern Pride	2007	2008	Cairns	Queensland	Barlow Park	2	2014	Cowboys
	Norths Devils	1933	1996	Brisbane	Queensland	Bishop Park	3	2022	Broncos
	PNG Hunters	2013	2014	Port Moresby	National Capital District	National Football Stadium	1	2017	None
	Redcliffe Dolphins	1947	1996	Moreton Bay	Queensland	Moreton Daily Stadium	6	2018	Dolphins
	Souths Logan Magpies	1918	2003	Brisbane	Queensland	Davies Park	1	2008	Broncos
	Sunshine Coast Falcons	1996	2008	Sunshine Coast	Queensland	Sunshine Coast Stadium	1	2009	Storm
	Townsville Blackhawks	2014	2015	Townsville	Queensland	Jack Manski Oval	0	-	Cowboys
	Tweed Heads Seagulls	1909	2003	Tweed Heads	NSW	Piggabeen Sports Complex	1	2007	Titans
	Western Clydesdales	2016	2023	Toowoomba	Queensland	Clive Berghofer Stadium	0	-	Bulldogs
	Wynnum Manly Seagulls	1951	1996	Brisbane	Queensland	Kougari Oval	2	2012	Broncos
* The season the team joined the competition in its current form and consecutive tenure.

== Brisbane/Suburban Leagues ==
=== Brisbane Rugby League ===
Team name	Nickname	Home ground
Beenleigh	Pride	Hammel Park
Brighton	Roosters	Jim Lawrie Oval
Bulimba	Bulldogs	Balmoral Recreation Reserve
Carina	Tigers	Leo Williams Oval
Fortitude Valley	Diehards	Emerson Park
Normanby	Hounds	Bert St Clair Oval
Pine Rivers	Bears	Mathieson Oval
Souths Juniors	Magpies	Brandon Park
Wests	Panthers	Frank Lind Oval
Wynnum-Manly Juniors	Seagulls	Kitchener Park

=== Brisbane Second Division Rugby League The Poinsettias / The Stingers (Juniors) ===
Northside 1 (10)	Northside 2 (9)	Northside 3 (8)	Southside 1 (8)	Southside 2 (8)	Southside 3 (12)
Aspley Devils; Brisbane Natives RLFC; Brisbane Brothers; Dayboro Cowboys; Gators RLFC; North Lakes Kangaroos; Pine Central Holy Spirit Hornets; Wests Arana Hills Panthers; Wests Mitchelton Panthers; Valleys Diehards	Banyo Devils; Brighton Roosters; Gators RLFC (2); Narangba Rangers; Normanby Hounds; North Lakes Kangaroos (2); Pine Central Holy Spirit Hornets (2); Pine Rivers Bears; Wests Mitchelton Panthers (2)	Aspley Devils (2); Brighton Roosters (2); Burpengary Jets; North Lakes Kangaroos (3); Pine Rivers Bears (2); Samford Stags; Wests Mitchelton Panthers (3); Valleys Diehards (2)	Beenleigh Pride; Bulimba Valley Bulldogs; Carina Tigers; Easts Tigers; Logan Brothers RLFC; Redlands Parrots; Souths Sunnybank RLFC; Waterford Demons	Beenleigh Pride (2); Browns Plains Bears; Bulimba Valley Bulldogs (2); Carina Tigers (2); Eagleby Giants; Souths Acacia Ridge Magpies; Wynnum-Manly Seagulls	Beaudesert Kingfishers; Brothers St. Brendans RLFC; Capalaba Warriors; Logan Brothers RLFC (2); Logan Wanderers; Mt. Gravatt Eagles; Mustangs RLFC; North Stradbroke Island Sharks; Rochedale Tigers; Souths Inala Warriors; Redlands Parrots (2); Waterford Demons (2)

== Regional leagues ==
=== Central Queensland Capras ===
==== Bundaberg Rugby League ====
- Brothers Bundaberg
- Easts
- Hervey Bay
- Wallaroo Maryborough
- Waves Tigers
- Western Suburbs

==== Central Highlands Rugby League ====
- Blackwater Crushers
- Bluff Rabbitohs
- Clermont Bears
- Dysart Bulls
- Emerald Brothers
- Emerald Tigers
- Middlemount Panthers
- Peak Downs Pirates
- Springsure Mountain Men

==== Central West Rugby League ====
- Alpha Brumbies
- Barcaldine Sandgoannas
- Blackall Magpies
- Longreach-Ilfracombe Tigers
- Winton Diamantina Devils

==== Gladstone & District Rugby League ====
- Calliope Roosters
- Brothers Gladstone
- Tannum Sands Seagulls
- Valleys Diehards Gladstone
- Wallaby RLFC

==== Rockhampton & District Rugby League ====
- Biloela Panthers
- Brothers Rockhampton
- Emu Park RLFC
- Fitzroy-Gracemere Sharks
- Norths Chargers
- Yeppoon Seagulls

=== South West Queensland Mustangs ===
==== Roma District Rugby League ====
- Chinchilla Bulldogs
- Roma Cities
- Miles Devils
- Mitchell Magpies
- St George Dragons
- Taroom-Wandoan Battlers
- Wallumbilla-Surat Red Bulls
- Western Ringers

==== Toowoomba Rugby League ====
- Brothers Toowoomba
- Dalby Devils
- Gatton Hawks
- Goondiwindi Boars
- Highfields Eagles
- Newtown Lions
- Oakey Bears
- Pittsworth Danes
- Southern Suburbs Tigers
- Toowoomba Valleys Roosters
- Warwick Cowboys
- Wattles Warriors

Border Rivers Rugby League (part of Toowoomba Rugby League)

- Stanthorpe Gremlins
- Tenterfield Tigers (NSWCRL)
- Texas Terriers
- Inglewood Roosters

==== Defunct competitions ====
- Western Rugby League

=== Wide Bay Bulls ===
==== Central Burnett Rugby League ====
- Eidsvold Eagles
- Gayndah Gladiators
- Monto Roos
- Mundubbera Tigers

==== Northern Districts Rugby League ====
- Agnes Water Marlins
- Avondale Tigers
- Gin Gin Hawks
- Isis Devils (Childers)
- Miriam Vale Magpies
- South Kolan Sharks

==== South Burnett Rugby League ====
- Cherbourg Hornets
- Kingaroy Red Ants
- Murgon Mustangs
- Nanango Stags
- Wondai Proston Wolves

==== Sunshine Coast Gympie Rugby League ====
- Beachmere
- Beerwah Bulldogs
- Bribie Island Warrigals
- Caboolture Snakes
- Caloundra Sharks
- Coolum Colts
- Gympie Devils
- Kawana Dolphins
- Maroochydore-Coolum Swans
- Nambour Crushers
- Noosa Pirates
- Palmwoods Devils
- Pomona-Cooran Cutters
- Yandina Raiders

=== North Queensland Marlins ===
==== Cairns District Rugby League ====
- Atherton Roosters
- Cairns Brothers
- Innisfail Brothers
- Edmonton Storm
- Ivanhoes Knights
- Cairns Kangaroos
- Mareeba Gladiators
- Mossman Port Douglas Sharks
- Southern Suburbs Cockatoos
- Tully Tigers
- Yarrabah Seahawks

==== Mackay & District Rugby League ====
- Brothers Mackay
- Carltons
- Magpies
- Moranbah Miners
- Sarina Crocodiles
- Souths Sharks
- Wests Tigers Mackay
- Whitsundays Brahmans

==== Mid West Rugby League ====
- Hughenden Eagles
- Julia Creek Saints
- Normanton Stingers

==== Mount Isa Rugby League ====
- Mt Isa Brothers
- Cloncurry
- Black Star Diehards
- Mt Isa Townies
- Mt Isa Wranglers
- Mt Isa Wanderers

==== Remote Areas Rugby League ====
- Aurukun Kang Kang
- Central Cape Suns
- Cooktown Crocs
- Hope Vale Cockatoos
- Lockhart River Scorpions
- Mulga Tigers
- Napranum Bulldogs
- Old Mapoon
- Pormpuraaw Crocs
- Weipa Raiders
- Wujal Wujal Yindili
- Zenadth Kes RLFC

==== Townsville & District Rugby League ====
- Bowen Seagulls
- Townsville Brothers
- Burdekin (Ayr)
- Centrals Tigers
- Charters Towers Miners
- Herbert River Crushers
- Souths Bulls
- Norths Devils
- Western Lions
- Upper Ross Rams
- JCU Saints
- Palm Island Barracudas

==== Defunct competitions ====
- Mid West Rugby League
- Northern Peninsula Area Rugby League

=== South East Poinsettias ===
==== Gold Coast Rugby League (The Vikings) ====
- Beaudesert Kingfishers
- Burleigh Bears
- Coolangatta Knights
- Coomera Cutters
- Currumbin Eagles
- Helensvale Hornets
- Jimboomba Thunder
- Mount Tamborine Bushrats
- Mudgeeraba Redbacks
- Nerang Roosters
- Ormeau Shearers
- Parkwood Sharks
- Robina Raptors
- Runaway Bay Seagulls
- South Tweed Koalas
- Southport Tigers
- Tugun Seahawks
- Tweed Heads Seagulls

==== Ipswich Rugby League (The Diggers) ====
- Brisbane Valley Bulls
- Brothers Ipswich Leprechauns
- Fassifern Bombers
- Goodna Eagles
- Karalee Tornadoes
- Laidley Lions
- Lowood Stags
- Northern Suburbs Tigers
- Redbank Plains Bears
- Rosewood Roosters
- Springfield Panthers
- Ipswich Swifts Bluebirds
- West End Bulldogs
