= List of rugby league competitions in Australia =

This is a list of rugby league competitions in Australia with their respective premiers. This list contains only the first-grade tier for professional competitions as well as country and statewide semi-professional youth competitions.

== Domestic ==
=== National ===
Name	Teams	Founded	Most Recent Premier	Score	Runner-up
National Rugby League	17	1998	Brisbane Broncos	26–22	Melbourne Storm
NRL State Championship	2	2014	New Zealand Warriors	50–20	Burleigh Bears
NRL Women's Premiership	10	2018	Brisbane Broncos Women	22–18	Sydney Roosters Women

== Men's competitions ==
=== New South Wales ===
Name	Location	Founded	Teams	Most Recent Premier	Score	Runner-up
Knock-On Effect NSW Cup	NSW, ACT, VIC, NZ	1908	13	New Zealand Warriors	30–12	St George Illawarra Dragons
City (NSWRL)
Ron Massey Cup	Sydney	2003	9	St Mary's Saints	34–22	Wentworthville Magpies
Sydney Shield	Sydney	2012	12	East Campbelltown Eagles	32-22	Guildford Owls
Sydney Combined - Northern Open Age	Northern Beaches	?	6	Narrabeen Sharks	26-6	Berowra Wallabies
Sydney Combined - South Eastern Open Age Gold	Sutherland	1964	5	De La Salle Caringbah	20-8	Engadine Dragons
South Sydney District A Grade	Inner-City	1908	7	Redfern All Blacks	28-12	Mascot Jets
Penrith & District A Grade	Western Sydney	1967	8	Windsor Wolves	28-4	Glenmore Park Brumbies
Parramatta District A-Grade	Western Sydney	1948	6	St Johns Eagles	34-24	Wentworthville Magpies
Country (CRL)
Northern Rivers Rugby League	Northern Rivers	2005 (Note: Merger of Group 1 Rugby League and Group 18 Rugby League(1914-05) which both field junior competitions.)	11	Cudgen Hornets	18-4	Ballina Seagulls
Group 2 Rugby League	Mid North Coast	1966	9	Woolgoolga Seahorses	26-10	South Grafton Rebels
Group 3 Rugby League	Mid North Coast	1946 (Note: Formed as Group 18 in 1946 but when the boundaries were re-drawn in 1966 to include three new clubs the group's name was changed to Group 3.)	8	Old Bar Pirates	22-10	Port Maquarie Sharks
Group 4 Rugby League	New England	1913	6	North Tamworth Bears	26-16	Moree Boars
Group 19 Rugby League	New England	1980 (Note: Group 5 was the local competition from 1961 until it merged with another local competition to form Group 19 in 1980.)	9	Narwan Eels	34-22	Inverell Hawks
Group 21 Rugby League	Hunter	1955	6	Scone Thoroughbreds	30-28	Greta Branxton Colts
Canberra Raiders Cup	ACT & surroundings	1998 (Note: This competition was formed by Group 8 and Group 19 which were formed in 1932 and 1946 respectively.)	9	Queanbeyan Roos	34-14	Tuggeranong Bushrangers
George Tooke Shield	ACT & surroundings	1995	9	Boorowa Rovers	22-8	Crookwell Green Devils
Group 9 Rugby League	Wagga & districts	1923	11	Tumut Blues	23-18	Wagga Wagga Kangaroos
Group 20 Rugby League	Griffith & districts	1954	9	Leeton Greenies	28-24	Darlington Point-Coleambally Roosters
Peter McDonald Premiership (10/11)	Central West	2022	12	Dubbo CYMS	25-12	Mudgee Dragons
Castlereagh Cup	Central West	2001	8	Gulgong Terriers	10-6	Cobar Roosters
Woodbridge Cup	Central West	1991	9	Manildra Rhinos	18-16	Trundle Boomers
Outback Rugby League	Broken Hill & districts	1980	6	Wilcannia Boomerangs	23-22	Menindee Yabbies
Illawarra Rugby League	Illawarra	1911	7	Thirroul Butchers	24-18	Collegians
Group 6 Rugby League	Southern Highlands & Macarthur	1914 (Note: Formed as Berrima District Rugby League and changed its name to Group 6 in 1946.)	8	Thirlmere-Tahmoor Roosters	28-26	Camden Rams
Group 7 Rugby League	South Coast	1914 (Note: Formed as South Coast Rugby League and changed its name to Group 7 in 1955.)	11	Gerringong Lions	32-22	Shellharbour Sharks
Group 16 Rugby League	Far South Coast	1946	8	Merimbula-Pambula Bulldogs	38-18	Eden Tigers
Newcastle & Hunter Rugby League	Newcastle & Hunter	2010	38	Dora Creek Swampies	20-14	Waratah Mayfield Cheetahs
Tooheys Newcastle Cup	Newcastle	1910	8	Maitland Pumpkin Pickers	46-10	South Newcastle
Central Coast Rugby League	Central Coast, New South Wales	1947 (Note: Formed in 1947 as a junior competition for Newcastle club, Lakes United. It was upgraded to full CRL membership as Group 12 in 1967 then renamed in 1981.)	10	Toukley Hawks	8-6	Erina Eagles

City updated as of 2019; Country Updated as of 2023.

=== Queensland ===
Name	Location	Teams	Founded	Winner	Score	Runners-up
Hostplus Cup	Queensland & PNG	14	1996	Redcliffe Dolphins	36-22	Easts Tigers
South East Region
Brisbane A-Grade Rugby League	Brisbane & Districts	6	2014	Bayside Seagulls	28-20	Redcliffe Dolphins
Gold Coast A-Grade	Gold Coast & Districts	8	1996	Runaway Bay Seagulls	36-10	Tweed Heads Seagulls
Ipswich A-Grade	Ipswich & Districts	6	1992	Fassifern Bombers	32-10	Norths Tigers
Northern Region
Cairns District Rugby League	Cairns & Districts	11	1918	Mossman Port Douglas Sharks	36-12	Tully Tigers
Mackay & District Rugby League	Mackay & Districts	8	1919	Wests Tigers	42-18	Mackay Brothers
Mid West Rugby League						
Mount Isa Rugby League	Mount Isa	3	1953	Town Lions	26-20	Wanderers
Townsville District Rugby League	Gulf Country	7	1978	Centrals Tigers	46-22	Townsville Brothers
Remote Areas Rugby League						
Central Region
Border Rivers Rugby League						
Central Burnett Rugby League	North Burnett	3	1921	Gayndah Gladiators	38-34	Mundubbera Tigers
Central Highlands Rugby League	Central Highlands	8	1983	Blackwater Crushers	24-16	Bluff Rabbitohs
Central West Rugby League	Central West	5	1900s	Barcaldine Sandgoannas	14-10	Blackall Magpies
Gladstone District Rugby League	Gladstone	5	1918	Valleys	14-10	Wallabys
Northern Districts Rugby League	Wide Bay	6	1900s	Miriam Vale Magpies	34-24	South Kolan Sharks
Rockhampton District Rugby League	Rockhampton	6	1918	Yeppoon Seagulls	26-16	Rockhampton Brothers
Roma District Rugby League	Roma & Districts	7	1914	Chinchilla Bulldogs	28-14	Wallumbilla-Surat Red Bulls
Toowoomba Rugby League	Toowoomba	11	1919	Toowoomba Valleys Roosters	24-22	Wattles Warriors
Bundaberg Rugby League	Bundaberg & Districts	6	1913	Waves Tigers	23-20	Wallaroos
South Burnett Rugby League	South Burnett	5	1923	Nanango Stags	48-0	Kingaroy Red Ants
Sunshine Coast-Gympie Rugby League	Sunshine Coast & Gympie	8	1919	Maroochydore Swans	22-20	Beerwah Bulldogs

Updated 2018

=== Other states ===
Name	Location	Teams	Founded	Winner	Score	Runners-up
Western Australia (NRL WA)
Smarter Than Smoking Premiership	Perth	6	1948	North Beach Sea Eagles	26-24	South Perth Lions
Pilbara Rugby League	Pilbara	5	2000s			
Northern Territory (NRL NT)
Quitline A Grade Premiership	Darwin	6	1950	Northern Sharks RLFC	14-8	Palmerston Raiders
Central Australian Rugby Football League	Alice Springs	4	1963	Wests Dragons	30-38	Alice Springs Brothers
South Australia (NRL SA)
NRL SA Metro First Grade	Adelaide	5	1976	Eastern Eels	26-22	Central Districts Roosters
Limestone Coast Rugby League	Mount Gambier	5		Gunditjmara Bulls	22-8	Stawell Mounties
Victoria (NRL Victoria)
Storm Premiership	Melbourne	6	1952	Truganina Rabbitohs	52-16	Altona Roosters
Murray Cup	Wodonga	8	1998	Wodonga Wombats	40-4	Bonegilla Gorillas

Updated 2022

== Women's competitions ==
=== New South Wales & Queensland ===
Name	Location	Teams	Founded	Winner	Score	Runners-up
New South Wales (NSWWRL)
NSWRL Women's Premiership	Statewide	9	2005	Mount Pritchard Mounties	12-10	South Sydney Rabbitohs
Tarsha Gale Cup (U/18s)	Statewide	10	2017	Illawarra Steelers	24-12	Newcastle Knights
Country (CRL)
Northern Rivers Rugby League	Northern Rivers	11	2005	Marist Brothers Rams	14-6	Byron Bay Red Devils
Group 2 Rugby League	Mid North Coast	8	?	South Grafton Rebels	8-4	Sawtell Panthers
Group 3 Rugby League	Mid North Coast	8	1946	Port City Breakers	22-10	Port Maquarie Sharks
Group 4 Rugby League	West New England	11	?	Kootingal-Moonbi Roosters	12-11	North Tamworth Bears
Group 19 Rugby League	New England	7	1980	Inverell Hawks	18-4	Glen Innes Magpies
Group 21 Rugby League	Hunter	8	1955	Scone Thoroughbreds	38-4	Muswellbrook Rams
Katrina Fanning Shield	ACT & surroundings	8	2017	Goulburn Workers Bulldogs	20-8	Yass Magpies
Group 9 Rugby League	Wagga & districts	10	1923	Wagga Wagga Brothers	18-0	Albury Thunder
Group 20 Rugby League	Griffith & districts	9	?	Griffith Black & White Panthers	36-18	Hay Magpies
Group 10 Rugby League	Central West	9	1958	Bathurst Saint Patricks	16-6	Orange Hawks
Group 11 Rugby League	Dubbo	8	1946	Parkes Spacecats	22-10	Dubbo Westside
Castlereagh Cup	Central West	9	2001	Baradine Magpies	6-0	Coonamble Bears
Woodbridge Cup	Central West	9	1991	Cargo Blue Heelers	20-18	Eugowra Golden Eagles
Barwon Darling	?	6	?	Walgett Dragons	4-0	Brewarrina Golden Googettes
Illawarra Rugby League	Illawarra	7	?	Corrimal Cougars	28-0	Helensburgh Tigers
Group 6 Rugby League	Southern Highlands & Macarthur	11	1914	City Kangaroos Blue	18-16	Narellan Jets
Group 7 Rugby League	South Coast	7	1914	Kiama Knights	20-18	Jambaroo Superoos
Group 16 Rugby League	Far South Coast	8	1946	Eden Tigerettes Tigers	18-0	Bombala High Heelers
Newcastle & Hunter Rugby League	Hunter	7	?	Aberglasslyn Ants	18-4	University of Newcastle Seahorses
Queensland (QWRL)
Brisbane and District Women's Rugby League	Brisbane		2004	Burleigh Bears	14-0	West Brisbane Panthers

=== Other states ===
Name	Location	Founded	Teams	Winner	Score	Runners-up
Western Australia (WARL)
All Flags Signs & Banners Women's Rugby League	Perth	?	4	Ellenbrook Rabbitohs	20-16	Joondalup Giants
South Australia (SARL)
NRL South Australia Women's	Adelaide	2023	3			
Northern Territory (NTRL)
Women's Premiership	Darwin & Katherine	1950	5	Nightcliff Dragons	18-12	Northern Sharks
Victoria (VRL)
NRL VIC Women's First Grade	Melbourne	?	6	Werribee Bears	14-12	Truganina Rabbitohs

Updated 2018

== Youth competitions ==
Name	Location	Teams	Founded	Winner	Score	Runners-up
Holden Cup U20s	Australia, New Zealand	16	2008	Manly-Warringah Sea Eagles	20-18 (Note: 2017 Holden Cup Finals Result)	Parramatta Eels
Under 18 National Final	Australia	2	2011	Penrith Panthers (NSWRL)	38-32	Souths Logan Magpies (QLD)
Under 16 National Final	Australia	2	2011	Parramatta Eels	32-0 (Note: 2016 Under 16 National Finals Result.)	Townsville Blackhawks
GIO Schoolboy Cup	Australia		1975	Palm Beach Currumbin SHS	20-12	Patrician Brothers' College Blacktown
New South Wales (NSWRL)
Jersey Flegg Cup (U/21s)	Statewide, VIC & WA	12	1961	Cronulla-Sutherland Sharks	22-12	Penrith Panthers
SG Ball Cup (U/19s)	Statewide, VIC & WA	17	1965	Illawarra Steelers	34-23	Manly Warringah Sea Eagles
Harold Matthews Cup (U/17s)	Statewide	15	1970	Newcastle Knights	28-8	Canterbury-Bankstown Bulldogs
Andrew Johns Cup (U16's)	Australia	2	2018	Manly Warringah Sea Eagles (NSWRL)	32-12	Western Rams (CRL)
Queensland (QRL)
Hastings Deering Colts (U/20s)	Statewide, NSW	15	2018	Norths Devils	20-16	Townsville Blackhawks
Mal Meninga Cup (U/18s)	Statewide, NSW	16	2009	Souths Logan Magpies	18-16	Norths Devils
Cyril Connell Cup (U/16s)	Statewide & NT	15	2009	Townsville Blackhawks	20-18 (Note: 2016 Cyril Connell Finals Result.)	Souths Logan Magpies

Updated as of 1 October 2017

== See also ==
- Rugby league in Australia
- Australian Rugby League Commission
- List of Australian rugby league clubs
- List of Australian rugby league stadiums by capacity
- List of results of the Australian Kangaroos
- Sport in Australia
