= Rugby league in Queensland =

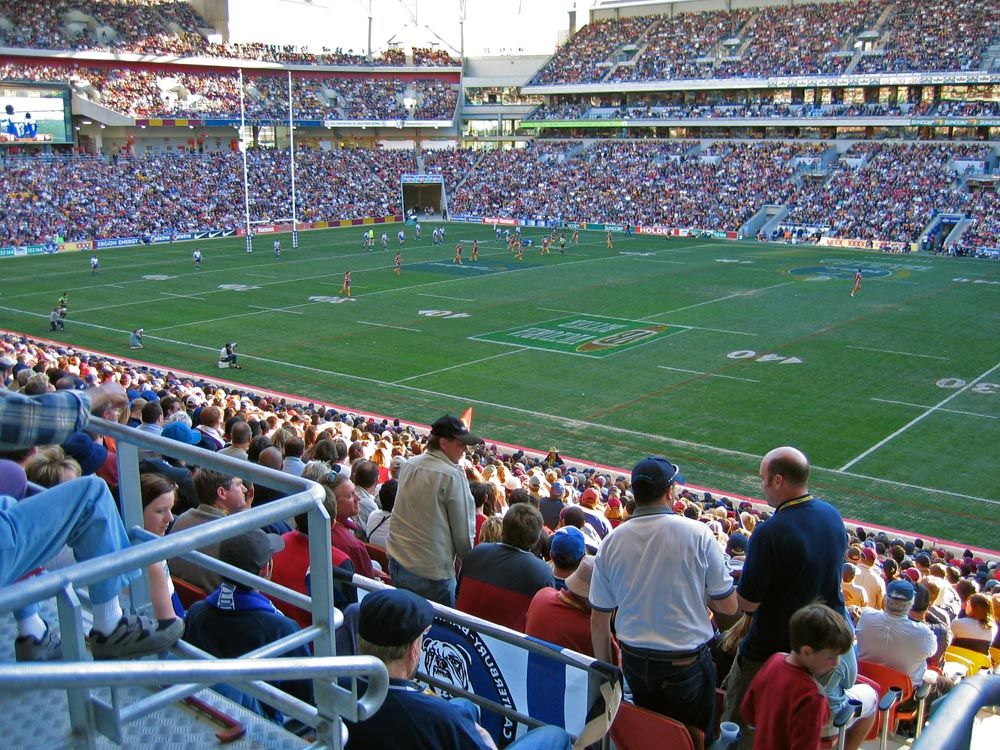
- Brisbane Broncos at Suncorp Stadium
- Governing body: Queensland Rugby League
- Representative team: Queensland
- Nicknames: football, footy
- First played: 1908 in Brisbane
- Registered players: 62,618 (adult) (+ touch: 68,686); 10,943 (child) (+ touch: 11,328)

Club competitions
- Queensland Cup; Brisbane A-Grade; Brisbane Second Division; Gold Coast Rugby League; Foley Shield; FOGS Colts Challenge

Audience records
- Single match: 58,912 1997 Super League Grand Final (ANZ Stadium, Brisbane)

In Queensland, Rugby league was introduced in 1908 and is the most watched winter sport in the state and the third most participated football code after soccer and touch football. Queensland Rugby League is the governing body and has 62,618 adult and 10,943 child tackle players. Rugby league authorities often count touch football players as participants, though that sport is only loosely affiliated and is separately governed by Touch Football Queensland.

Within its first decade it surpassed rugby union there to become the most popular football code as players switched to play professionally in the Queensland Rugby League (QRL). In the 1920s, Queenslanders began leaving to play professionally in the New South Wales Rugby League which became a more popular competition. However Queensland maintained a strong rugby league culture, with the state continuing to perform well in interstate rugby league. The later advent of the State of Origin series ensured that players would return to represent their state. Regarded as "Australian sport's greatest rivalry", the term "Origin fever" is used by the media to describe the passion of the Queenslanders public for the competition and the chant "Queenslander!", attributed to Billy Moore in 1995, has become the state's battle cry.

Queensland is home to four professional clubs, the Brisbane Broncos (1988), North Queensland Cowboys (1995), Gold Coast Titans (2007) and Redcliffe Dolphins (NRL) (2023) all participating in the National Rugby League (NRL). Lang Park, the spiritual home of the code in Queensland, is home to the two Brisbane based clubs. The Broncos, the oldest and most popular in the state, records the highest annual revenue of all NRL clubs. Along with financial competitiveness, the Broncos have been voted one of Australia's most popular and most watched football teams, and has one of the highest average attendances of any rugby league club in the world; 33,337 in the 2012 NRL season. Since 2019 Brisbane has also hosted Magic Round, a special NRL round in which all matches are played at Lang Park, the event is highly popular and averages near capacity for attendance at Lang Park.

Queensland origin legends include: Wally Lewis, Darren Lockyer, Mal Meninga, Allan Langer, Johnathan Thurston, Arthur Beetson, Shane Webcke, Gorden Tallis, Wendell Sailor, Greg Inglis, Bob Lindner, Trevor Gillmeister, Cameron Smith, Billy Slater, Cooper Cronk, Paul Vautin, Lote Tuquiri, and Petero Civoniceva.

== History ==
=== Rugby Football in Queensland ===
The earliest record of rugby football being played in Queensland is in 1876, when the Brisbane Football Club, formed in 1866 to play 'Victorian Rules', commenced playing according to the recently codified Rugby (Union) rules, to fit in with two newly formed football clubs (Rangers and Bonnet Rouge), before reverting to Australian Rules (with occasional Rugby matches) in 1879. The Queensland Rugby Union was subsequently constituted as the Northern Rugby Union in 1883, and a year later the first organised club competition took place in Brisbane. By 1887, the switch of private schools to rugby and regular contests between Queensland and New South Wales saw rugby's popularity overtake the Australian code, resulting in its complete demise in the colony by 1892.

=== Introduction of Rugby League and impact of Professionalism ===
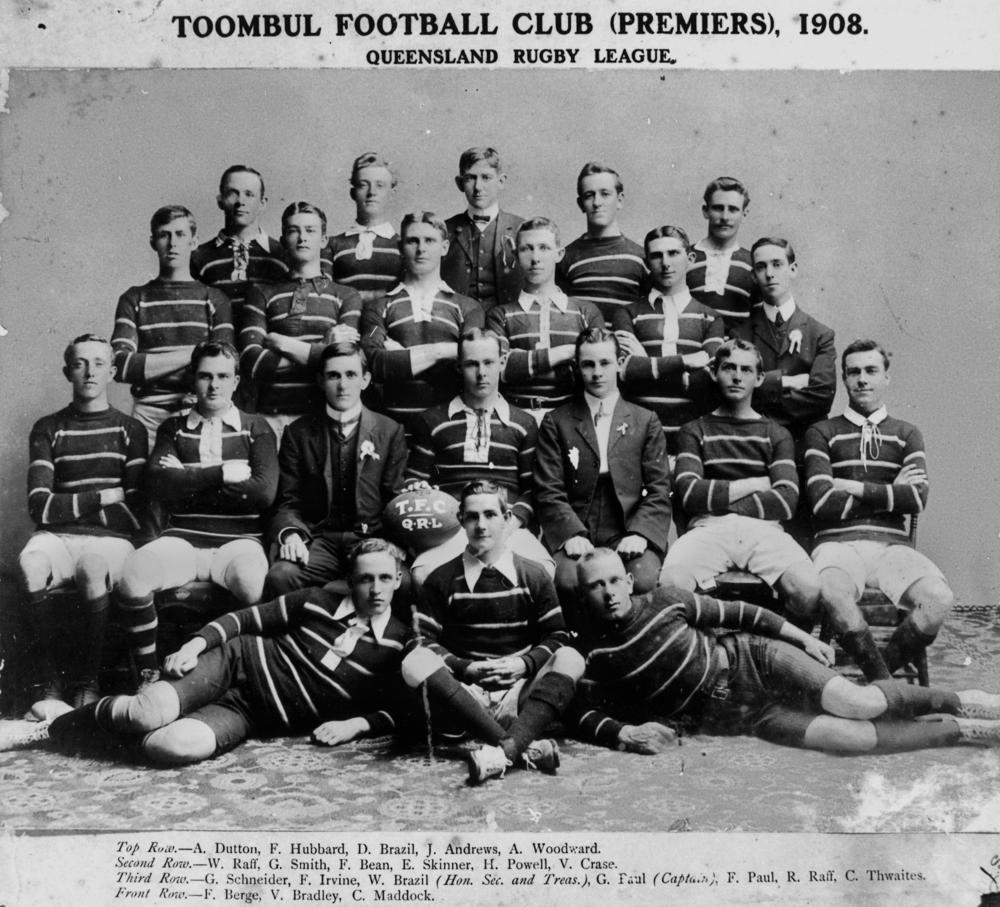
Toombul Football Club, first Queensland premiers in 1908

On 16 May 1908 the first game of rugby league was played in the state when the touring New Zealand team played Queensland at the Brisbane Exhibition Ground.

The advent of professional rugby league in New South Wales saw many Queensland rugby players leaving for Sydney to play rugby league.

=== First Competitions ===
In 1908, the Queensland Rugby Union banned its players from going to Sydney to play rugby league, which resulted in disgruntled players forming the Queensland Amateur Rugby Football League (QARFL) (later renamed Queensland Rugby League). The new organisation was attacked by the local press and the QRU for introducing professionalism, which they claimed would destroy the sport. The first official club competition kicked off in Brisbane on May 8, 1909.

The league put down strong roots in the bush and in working class communities and these areas are still the heartland of the modern game of rugby league. Between 1914 and 1918 some major rugby union clubs switched to rugby league. By 1920, rugby union ceased to exist in Queensland.

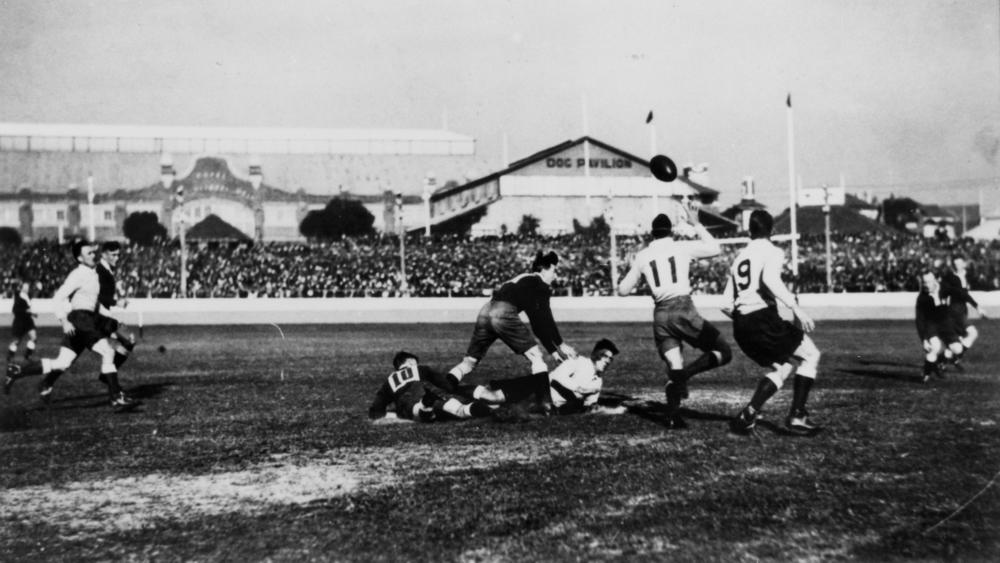
Queensland vs New South Wales interstate match, 1920

In 1922 the Brisbane Rugby Football League (BRFL, later BRL) was formed out of dissatisfaction with the way the QRL ran the game. Those involved took particular exception to the salary being earned by Harry Sunderland as secretary of the QRL. It remained the premier competition in Queensland for 75 years and the premier level of rugby league in the state until 1988.

By the late-1970s, crowds began to desert the BRL competition. Clubs found themselves in financial hardship, and the public began to support the Sydney competition which by then was being broadcast in Queensland. However, a small resurgence in the popularity of the Brisbane competition occurred after Queensland dominated the Interstate Series under new State of Origin rules. A statewide top tier short-format competition similar to the NSWRL's Amco Cup - the Winfield State League would run in parallel to the BRL competition from 1982 to 1995.

==== Demise of the BRL into a Second Tier Competition ====
From 1909 to 1987, the Queensland Rugby Football League Premiership and the Brisbane Rugby League were considered to be top tier competitions parallel to the NSWRL premiership. This changed when, in 1988, the newly formed Brisbane Broncos and the Gold Coast-Tweed Giants joined the New South Wales Rugby League premiership. This led to the Brisbane Rugby League premiership being considered by most senior rugby league historians to have become a second-tier league in this year, as almost all of the top players in the competition left to play for either of the two new Queensland franchises in the NSWRL, including Wally Lewis, Gene Miles, Colin Scott, Joe Kilroy, Bryan Niebling, Greg Conescu, and Greg Dowling who all joined the QRL's original bid, the Brisbane Broncos.

=== Local Competitions after the NSWRL Expansion ===
After the Broncos and Giants joined the NSWRL, the Brisbane Rugby League, along with its companion statewide competition the Winfield State League, remained, at least officially, first tier competitions. Both competitions eventually merged with each other into the statewide Queensland Cup in 1996, and after existing as a short post-season tournament to find a Brisbane champion in 1996 and 1997, the BRL was officially disbanded after 75 seasons in 1997.

The Brisbane Rugby League (2001) was re-established as a third-tier competition below the NRL and Queensland Cup. This completed a remarkable fall from grace for the local Brisbane competition in stature, from a top level competition alongside the NSWRL until 1987, to a second-tier league from 1988 to 1997 and then a third-tier league from 2001, although most BRL clubs joined the Queensland Cup exclusively in 1998 and their reserve grade teams compete in the current BRL competition along with community clubs.

== Governing body ==
The Queensland Rugby League (QRL) is the governing body for the sport of rugby league in Queensland. It is a member of the Australian Rugby League (ARL) and selects the members of Queensland State of Origin teams.

== Participation ==
Registered players
2022-23	2023-24	2024-25
67,911	63,628	62,618

== National Rugby League ==
The National Rugby League (NRL) is Australia's top-level competition for the sport of rugby league.

The first Queensland teams joined the New South Wales Rugby League Premiership (the forerunner to the NRL) in 1988, which ultimately led to the downfall of the local Brisbane Premiership. These teams to begin play in the NSWRL were the Brisbane Broncos and Gold Coast-Tweed Giants. Following this, the NSWRL expanded again in 1995, changing its name to the Australian Rugby League (ARL) to reflect the growth of the competition from a state based league into creating two Queensland expansion teams, the North Queensland Cowboys (Townsville) and South Queensland Crushers (Brisbane). However, the Super League War led to the demise of the South Queensland Crushers and the Gold Coast Chargers (name change of the aforementioned Giants), who were culled by the league at the end of the 1997 and 1998 seasons respectively. In 2007, after nine years, top level rugby league returned to the Gold Coast with the admission of the Titans to the NRL. 16 years later the Dolphins was the 17th and the 3rd Brisbane team to be admitted to the league.

There are four Queensland based teams in the NRL: Brisbane Broncos, Dolphins, Gold Coast Titans, and North Queensland Cowboys.

The Gold Coast-Tweed Giants/Gold Coast Seagulls/Gold Coast Chargers played in the 1988-1998 seasons and the South Queensland Crushers competed from 1995 to 1997.

=== Current ===
Club	Location	Home Ground(s)	First season
Brisbane Broncos	Brisbane	Suncorp Stadium 52,500; QEII (ANZ) Stadium 48,500 *	1988
Dolphins	Brisbane	Suncorp Stadium 52,500; Kayo Stadium 11,500	2023
Gold Coast Titans	Gold Coast	Carrara Stadium 22,000; Cbus Super Stadium 27,500	2007
North Queensland Cowboys	Townsville	Stockland Stadium/Malanda Stadium/ Dairy Farmers Stadium/1300SMILES Stadium; North Queensland Stadium 25,000	1995

- Brisbane Broncos played 114 games at QEII (ANZ) Stadium/QSAC from round 1, 1993 to round 10, 2003

=== Former ===
Club	Location	Home Ground(s)	Seasons
Gold Coast-Tweed Giants*	Gold Coast	Seagulls Stadium 22,000 (12 home games)	1988 - 1998
Gold Coast Seagulls*	Gold Coast	Seagulls Stadium 22,000 (12 home games)	1988 - 1998
Gold Coast Chargers*	Gold Coast	Carrara Stadium 22,000 (12 home games)	1988 - 1998
South Queensland Crushers	Brisbane	Lang Park 22,000 (11 home games)	1995 - 1997

- = Gold Coast-Tweed Giants (1988-1989), Gold Coast Seagulls (1990-1995), Gold Coast Chargers (1996-1998)

== Major competitions in Queensland ==
=== Queensland Cup ===
The Queensland Cup has been contested since 1996. Since 1998 the team winning the Queensland Cup is considered to be the premier club team in Queensland. This is because in 1996 and 1997 it was contested parallel to the Brisbane Rugby League, which was considered the premier competition in the state.

The Queensland Cup grew out of the Winfield State League. Since its formation in 1995, the Queensland Cup has been known as the Queensland Cup, Bundy Gold Cup, Channel 9 Cup, Intrust Super Cup.
For sponsorship reasons it is currently known as the Hostplus Cup.

=== FOGS Cup & FOGS Colts Challenge ===
Also known as the FOGS Cup & FOGS Colts Challenge, they are run by the Queensland Rugby League's South East Division. It is made up of 12 clubs, 7 of which play in the Queensland Cup. Generally, it is regarded as the division below the Queensland Cup. The FOGS Cup and FOGS Colts Challenge used to be known as the Quest Cup and Mixwell Cup, respectively.

=== Foley Shield ===
The Foley Shield competition began in North Queensland in 1948. With the introduction of the Queensland Cup in 1996 the Foley Shield competition was scrapped, only to be reintroduced in 2000. Since the revamp in 2000 it has only contested by the three largest cities in North Queensland; Cairns, Mackay and Townsville.

=== 47th Battalion Shield ===
Like the Northern Division's "Foley Shield" or the South-East Division's "Bulimba Cup" the "47th Battalion Shield" is run as the Central Region's regional Carnival and none of the teams are club teams, with the only exception being some of the Women's teams. Its traditionally held over one weekend and normally at one venue with multiple grounds to play on.

== Local Competitions ==
There are over 250 clubs in Queensland, across over 20 competitions:

- Cairns District Rugby League
- Mackay & District Rugby League
- Mid West Rugby League
- Mount Isa Rugby League
- Remote Areas Rugby League
- Townsville District Rugby League
- Central Highlands Rugby League
- Central West Rugby League
- Gladstone District Rugby League
- Rockhampton District Rugby League
- Border Rivers Rugby League
- Roma District Rugby League
- Toowoomba Rugby League
- Bundaberg Rugby League
- Central Burnett Rugby League
- Northern Districts Rugby League
- South Burnett Rugby League
- Sunshine Coast Gympie Rugby League
- Brisbane A-Grade Rugby League
- Brisbane Second Division Rugby League (Women)
- Ipswich Rugby League
- Gold Coast Rugby League

== Regions ==
The game in the state is administered by five regions, these being:

- Central Queensland Capras
- North Queensland Marlins
- South East Poinsettias
- South West Queensland Mustangs
- Wide Bay Bulls

== Past competitions ==
- The Brisbane Rugby League (BRL) premiership was the premier competition in Queensland from 1909 until 1997. It was superseded by the Queensland Cup.
- The Bulimba Cup was a representative competition contested between Brisbane, Ipswich and Toowoomba. It was contested between 1925 and 1972.
- The Winfield State League was a Queensland-wide competition that was held in a variety of formats between 1982 and 1995. This competition was superseded by the Queensland Cup.

== State of Origin ==
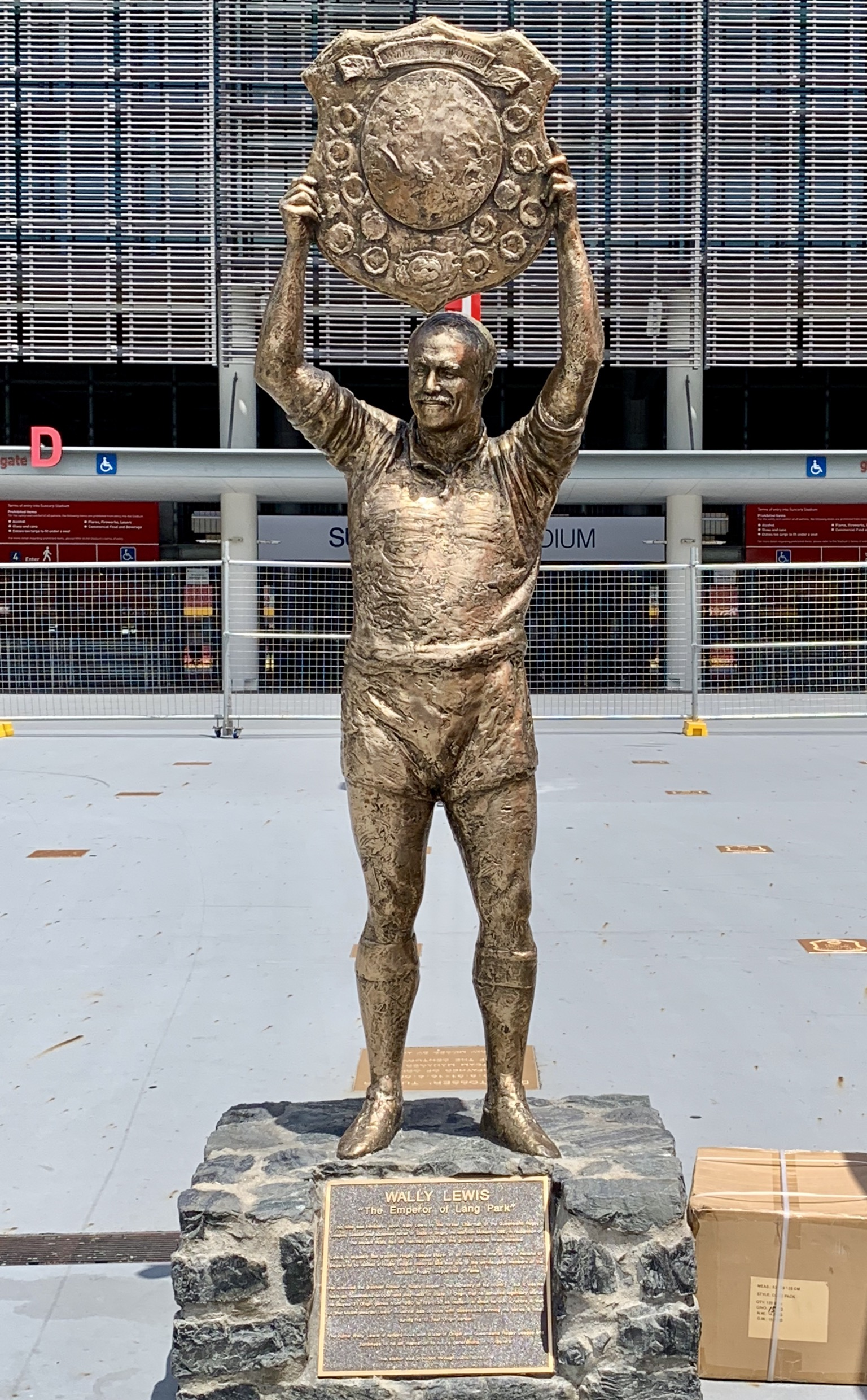
Wally Lewis statue outside Suncorp Stadium (Lang Park), Brisbane (2022)

The Queensland State of Origin side, known as the 'Maroons', is celebrated within Queensland. Purely a representative team, they play three games a year against New South Wales, the 'Blues', in the competition known as the State of Origin, thus named because players represent their state of birth or the state where they played their first senior game of football. They are currently captained by Daly Cherry-Evans and coached by Billy Slater.

The Queensland and New South Wales teams are heavily competitive, known as 'Australia's greatest sporting rivalry'. During the 1980s Queensland had the upper hand (8 out of 10 to Qld); during the 1990s, factoring in Super League which took out most of the Queensland team (through the Brisbane Broncos), the results were reasonably similar (6 out of 10 to NSW); and during the first decade of the 2000s, New South Wales has had the upper hand, but are by no means dominant (4 out of 7 to NSW, with the most recent to Qld).

== See also ==
- Rugby league in Australia
- Sport in Queensland
