= Queensland Rugby League =

Governing body of rugby league football in Queensland, Australia

- Founded: 1908, Brisbane, Australia
- Formerly named: Queensland Rugby Association (1908); Queensland Amateur Rugby League (1909–1911)
- Responsibility: Queensland
- Headquarters: Castlemaine Street, Milton, Brisbane
- Key people: John McDonald (Chair); Jeff ReibelCEO (Chief Executive)
- Men's coach: Billy Slater
- Women's coach: Tahnee Norris
- Competitions: Queensland Cup; FOGS Cup; FOGS Colts Challenge; Foley Shield; Bulimba Cup; 47th Battalion Shield
- Website: http://www.qrl.com.au/

(Queensland)
- As of 2 December 2009

The Queensland Rugby Football League (QRL) is the governing body for rugby league in Queensland. It is a member of the Australian Rugby League Commission (ARL Commission) and selects the members of the Queensland rugby league team.

The QRL aims to "foster, develop, extend, govern and control Rugby League Football throughout the State of Queensland". Today the QRL administers the rugby league through its regional divisions. It is also responsible for the Queensland Rugby League team. The QRL's headquarters are on Vulture Street, Woolloongabba in Brisbane.

Logo from 2013 to 2020

== History of the QRL ==
The Queensland Rugby Football League was formed in 1908 by seven rugby players who were dissatisfied with the administration of the Queensland Rugby Union (QRU) as the Queensland Rugby Association. Those founding fathers were Micky Dore, George Watson, Jack Fihelly, J O'Connor. E Buchanan, Alf Faulkner and Sine Boland. Discussion about breaking away from the rugby 'union' and forming a professional 'league' in Queensland can be traced as far back as 1905 through the visions of then Deputy State Premier, Michael Allison.

Founders of the QRL, 1907

On 14 March 1908, the breakaway group was first mentioned in the local media, and a fortnight later the first official announcement was made regarding the formation of the Queensland Rugby Association was made. On 16 May that year a hastily assembled Queensland team played the touring New Zealand "All Golds" side in Brisbane. Later that month there were three representative games against New South Wales, which acted as selection trials for a national team.

In 1909, club rugby league officially began, with W. Evans scoring the inaugural try before backing up with another as North Brisbane beat Toombul 8–0 at the Brisbane Cricket Ground, although Valleys were the first premiers. Other teams that entered the competition include: Milton (1909), South Brisbane (1909), West End (1910), Natives (1912), Merthyr (1917) and Coorparoo (1917).

In 2012, the QRL formally joined with the NSWRL and each National Rugby League club, to form the Australian Rugby League Commission, which is the overarching governing body for all of Rugby League throughout Australia. Notwithstanding the Commission's role as supreme governing authority for the code, the QRL retains responsibility for both management of the Queensland State of Origin team in Origin series, as well as day-to-day accountability for the operations of the Queensland Cup second-tier league, and junior representative Rugby League, plus divisional leagues, throughout Queensland.

== Current Major Competitions ==
=== Hostplus Cup ===
The Queensland Cup has been contested since 1996. Since 1998 the team winning the Queensland Cup is considered to be the premier club team in Queensland.

The teams currently playing are:

Brisbane Tigers (Eastern Suburbs Tigers)
Burleigh Bears
Central Queensland Capras
Ipswich Jets
Mackay Cutters
Northern Queensland Pride
Northern Suburbs Devils
Papua New Guinea Hunters
Redcliffe Dolphins
Southern Suburbs Logan Magpies
Sunshine Coast Falcons
Townsville Blackhawks
Tweed Heads Seagulls
Western Queensland Clydesdales
Wynnum Manly Seagulls

The teams formerly playing were:

Aspley Devils/Aspley Broncos
Brothers Valleys Diehards
Cairns Cyclones
Gold Coast Vikings
Logan City Scorpions
Mackay Sea Eagles
North Queensland Young Guns
Past Brothers Brisbane Leprechauns
Port Moresby Vipers
Townsville Stingers
Toowoomba Clydesdales
Western Suburbs Panthers

=== Brisbane A-Grade Rugby League/FOGS Cup ===
The Brisbane A-Grade Rugby League, also known as the FOGS Cup, and the FOGS Colts Challenge is run by the Queensland Rugby League's South East Division. It is regarded as the division below the Queensland Cup.

The teams are:

Beenleigh Pride
Brighton Roosters
Bulimba Valley Bulldogs
Carina Tigers
Fortitude Valley Diehards
Normanby Hounds
Pine Rivers Bears
Southern Suburbs Logan Magpies
Western Suburbs Panthers
Wynnum-Manly Seagulls

=== Cyril Connell Cup and Mal Meninga Cup ===
The Cyril Connell Cup & Mal Meninga Cup were introduced in 2009 to provide a pathway for young rugby league players to reach the professional levels of the game. Named after famous Queensland rugby league personalities Cyril Connell and Mal Meninga, the Cups have proved popular. Both competitions have the same structure of sixteen team split into two geographically aligned groups. Pool A contains teams from outside of Brisbane while Pool B comprises teams from the Brisbane metropolitan area and two Gold Coast Rugby League selections. The Cyril Connell Cup was discontinued after 2016.

The teams are:

Pool A	Pool B
Central Qld Capras	Northern Suburbs Devils
Central United	Souths Logan Magpies
Ipswich RL	Eastern Suburbs Tigers
Mackay Cutters	Western Suburbs Panthers
Northern Pride	Redcliffe Dolphins
Toowoomba Clydesdales	Wynnum Manly Seagulls
Townsville Stingers	Gold Coast RL Gold
Sunshine Coast RL	Gold Coast RL Green

=== 47th Battalion Shield ===
Like the Northern Division's "Foley Shield" or the South-East Division's "Bulimba Cup" the "47th Battalion Shield" is run as the Central Region's regional Carnival and none of the teams are club teams, with the only exception being some of the Women's teams. Its traditionally held over one weekend and normally at one venue with multiple grounds to play on.

=== The Foley Shield ===
The Foley Shield competition began in North Queensland in 1948. With the introduction of the Queensland Cup in 1996 the Foley Shield competition was scrapped, only to be reintroduced in 2000. Since the revamp in 2000 it has only contested by the three largest cities in North Queensland; Cairns, Mackay and Townsville.

=== Former ===
==== Brisbane Rugby League Premiership ====
The Brisbane Rugby League Premiership was a former top-flight rugby league competition. The competition ran from 1922 until 1997, but became a second-tier competition with the advent of the ARL Premiership in 1995.

==== Bulimba Cup ====
The Bulimba Cup was similar to the Foley Shield in that it was contested by city representative sides in a region, this time the South East Region, with the teams being Brisbane, Ipswich and Toowoomba.

== QRL Divisions ==
The QRL administers rugby league in Queensland through the following divisions.

- As of 2010 the Central, South West and Wide Bay divisions were amalgamated to form the new Central Division.

=== Central Queensland Capras ===
- Central Highlands Rugby League
- Central West Rugby League
- Gladstone District Rugby League
- Rockhampton District Rugby League

==== South West Queensland Mustangs ====
- Roma District Rugby League
- Toowoomba Rugby League
  - Border Rivers Rugby League

==== Defunct Competitions ====
- Western Rugby League

==== Wide Bay Bulls ====
- Bundaberg Rugby League
- Central Burnett Rugby League
- Northern Districts Rugby League
- South Burnett Rugby League
- Sunshine Coast Gympie Rugby League

=== North Queensland Marlins ===
- Cairns District Rugby League
- Mackay & District Rugby League
- Mid West Rugby League
- Mount Isa Rugby League
- Remote Areas Rugby League
- Townsville District Rugby League

==== Defunct Competitions ====
- Northern Peninsula Area Rugby League

=== South East Poinsettias ===
- Brisbane Second Division Rugby League (The Poinsettias / The Stingers)
- Gold Coast Rugby League (The Vikings)
- Ipswich Rugby League (The Diggers)

== Seasons ==
- 1908 Queensland Rugby League season
- 1909 Queensland Rugby League season
- 1910 Queensland Rugby League season
- 1911 Queensland Rugby League season

== See also ==
- Rugby league in Queensland
- Australian Rugby League Commission
- Queensland rugby league team
