= 1911 Queensland Rugby League season =

- League: Queensland Amateur Rugby League
- Teams: 6
- Premiers: Valley-Toombul
- Runners-up: Ipswich B
- New teams: Ipswich B South United
- Disbanded: East Brisbane

Junior Premiership First Grade
- Number of teams: 7
- Premiers: South Brisbane B
- Runners-up: St. Bridget's

Junior Premiership Second Grade
- Number of teams: 4
- Premiers: Toombul
- Runners-up: Mildura

The Queensland Amateur Rugby League conducted four grade competitions during 1911 and in representative football, played three sets of three-match series by Queensland teams against New South Wales, New Zealand and the "Northern Districts" on New South Wales. Ipswich fielded two teams in the senior QARL competition and also held two lower grade premierships. Club competitions continued in Maryborough.

== Season summary ==
=== Senior Grade ===
The QARL Senior premiership began and ended with four teams, but six teams played during the season. From the previous season, East Brisbane did not return. Valley and Toombul fielded a combined senior team, although they fielded separate junior teams.

On May 6, "The League officials plumed their feathers yesterday afternoon, and set out in two directions— to Ipswich and the 'Gabba — for the opening of their fixtures." South Brisbane played Valley-Toombul in Brisbane and Ipswich hosted North Brisbane.

Two new teams joined the competition whilst the Queensland representative team was in Sydney. On June 3, Ipswich B hosted and defeated Valley-Toombul, by 24 to 2, on the North Ipswich Cricket Reserve. One week later, they met South Brisbane United on the Brisbane Cricket Ground, Woolloongabba. Ipswich B defeated South United, 41 to 3.

All six teams played on June 17 before the suspension of the senior competition for a benefit match to the widow and child of Micky Dore and representative matches against New Zealand. Competitions matches were played on July 15 and 22 prior to another break for a trial and matches against the Northern Districts on NSW. The six teams played when the senior competition resumed but just one week later, on August 26, North Brisbane forfeited to Ipswich B and four of their players appeared for South United.

In fixtures listed in The Queensland Times, South United were due to play Ipswich A on September 2. There is no newspaper report of that match, nor any further mention of South United, in either the Times, The Brisbane Courier, Truth or The Telegraph.

The four remaining teams played on September 9 and 16. Valley-Toombul won both their matches. Ipswich B and South Brisbane each had one win. Ipswich A lost both. On September 23, Valley-Toombul met Ipswich B in, "the final match of the second round of the Queensland Rugby League's fixtures." Scoreless at half-time, Valley-Toombul triumphed 13 to nil as, "The soaked and mud-bespattered players worked with a will along most unorthodox lines, providing fun and plenty for the onlookers, by their scrambles and slips in the mud and splashes in the pools."

In sunnier conditions the following Saturday, September 30, Valley-Toombul again met Ipswich B at the 'Gabba. Playing in their maroon and white strip, Ipswich B had a try disallowed early in the match. Later they kicked a goal from a mark. Under the rules of the time, a mark could be claimed when an opponent's kick was caught. At half-time, Ipswich B led two-nil. Superior skills in the scrums secured the Valley-Toombul navy blues a larger share of possession, and they scored three second half tries to win, 13 to 2, and claim the premiership.

At the QRFL Annual Meeting in April 1912, it was reported that Valley-Toombul played 11 matches for 9 wins, a draw and one loss.

=== Junior Grades ===
Three junior competitions were held, First Grade, Second Grade and Third Grade. Matches began on May 13, although Third Grade may have started one week later. Whilst results of some junior matches were published in the newspapers most weeks, reporting on these matches was inconsistent.

Venues used for junior matches included the Brisbane Cricket Ground (as a curtain-raiser to a senior game), Albert Park, Albion Flats, Balmoral, Bulimba, Kelvin Grove, Land's Paddock, Paddington Reserve, Toombul, Toowong and West End Reserve.

Teams in the Junior First Grade competition included Kelvin Gordon, North Brisbane, South Brisbane A, South Brisbane B, St Bridget's, Toowong and Valley.

First Grade Semi-finals were played on September 9, with Toowong beating South Brisbane A and St. Bridget's defeating the team "leading on points after the second round", South Brisbane B. On the 16th, St. Bridget's beat Toowong. In a match advertised as a "Junior Challenge Final", South Brisbane B defeated St. Bridget's 12 to nil to claim the premiership. Their record was 10 wins and 3 losses from 13 matches.

The Junior Second Grade competition comprised at least four teams: Mildura, St. Bridget’s, Toombul and Violet.

In semi-finals held on September 9, Mildura defeated St. Bridget's 18-nil and Toombul 22 beat Violet 9. The result of a final, played on the 16th, was a win to Toombul by 19 points to Mildura's 5. Premiers Toombul were undefeated in their 12 matches.

The Junior Third Grade competition comprised at least six teams: Britannia, North Brisbane, South Brisbane A, South Brisbane B, Toombul and Toowong.

North Brisbane defeated Toombul in a final on September 9. However, "By virtue of being ahead in points on the second round, the Toombul club hold the right to challenge." In the second final on the following Saturday, Toombul won, but North Brisbane lodged a protest. This must have been dismissed, as Toombul were named as Junior Third Grade premiers in a report given at the QRFL Annual Meeting in April 1912. Toombul's record was 12 matches, 10 wins, 1 drawn, 1 loss. Runner's up North Brisbane played 12 matches for 8 wins, 2 draws and 2 losses.

=== Ipswich ===
Ipswich began the season with the intention of holding a local senior competition as well as two lower grades. Only two of the five clubs that had participated in the 1910 Ipswich Senior premiership nominated for 1911. One senior match was held on May 13, between Belvideres and Starlights, but both sides needed to call upon junior players. At a delegates meeting of the Ipswich Amateur Rugby League on the following Monday, May 15, there was agreement that a second Ipswich team be entered into the QARL senior competition. Senior players not required for either Ipswich team were permitted to play for their junior club.

The two lower grade premiership competitions in Ipswich saw teams join after they commenced and teams withdraw before the season ended. The competitions were also disrupted by forfeits, at a rough average of one per week.

Nine teams competed in what was initially called the Junior competition, but later was known as B Grade. Starlight B were the premiers, winning gold medals and a cup presented by the publican of the Commonwealth Hotel, Mr. W. Hartigan. The nine teams were Belvideres, Blackstone, Harrisville (late entry), Montes (also known as Silkstone), St Paul’s, Starlights A, Starlights B, Western Suburbs A and Western Suburbs B (withdrew).

The teams that finished second to fifth were invited to compete for a cup donated by the publican of the North Australian Hotel, Mr. Jack Lindsay. This was played as a knock-out in September. On the 16th, St. Paul's defeated Blackstone but Harrisville forfeited to the Belvideres. The following Saturday, Belvideres defeated St. Paul's to claim the Lindsay Cup.

The minor competition, also referred to as C Grade, was for Under 18 players. The competition began on May 6 with three teams, Belvideres, Starlights and Western Suburbs. They were joined by the Catholic Young Men’s Society (CYMS) on June 3, Silkstone and St. Paul’s on June 17 and Blackstone on July 14. Belvideres won the premiership without a final being played.

=== Maryborough ===
For the second year, Rugby League competitions were held in Maryborough. All three grades commenced on May 6.

Four teams entered the senior competition. Howard left to play in a Burrum district competition. Christian Brothers switched from Rugby Union to join Glebe, Natives and Wallaroos.

Seven teams competed in the Junior grade. Wallaroos were premiers, finishing one point ahead of Natives. They were followed by Glebe, Granville, Past Grammars, Present Grammars and Pialba.

Three teams competed in the Third grade. Wallaroos were premiers, ahead of Glebe and Natives.

== Representative Season ==
=== New South Wales ===
In early June, a representative Queensland team travelled to Sydney to play three matches in eight days against New South Wales. They were defeated by large margins in each encounter: 65 to 9 on the 3rd, 49 to nil on the 7th and 32 to 8 on June 10.

=== New Zealand ===
In June and July a New Zealand team toured Australia, playing against New South Wales, Newcastle and Queensland, although they did not play against an Australian team. Queensland won the second of three matches.

=== Northern Districts ===
A team billed in the newspapers as New South Wales, but composed of players from the Newcastle and Maitland competitions, visited Brisbane in August.

=== Players ===
Forty-five players represented Queensland in the nine matches played in 1911.

== Sources ==
- Digitised newspapers at the National Library of Australia's Trove website

- The Brisbane Courier
- The Bundaberg Mail and Burnett Advertiser
- The Maryborough Chronicle, Wide Bay and Burnett Advertiser
- The Queensland Times (Ipswich)
- The Telegraph (Brisbane)
- The Truth (Brisbane)

- http://www.rugbyleagueproject.org
