= FOGS Colts Challenge =

Rugby league competition in Australia

- Sport: Rugby league
- Instituted: 1986
- Inaugural season: 1986
- Ceased: 2017
- Replaced by: Hastings Deering Colts
- Chairman: Bruce Hatcher
- Number of teams: 15
- Country: Australia (15 teams)
- Premiers: Redcliffe Dolphins (2017)
- Most titles: Norths Devils
- Website: qrl.com.au
- Related competition: Jersey Flegg Cup; Mal Meninga Cup

The FOGS Colts Challenge is an 11-team rugby league competition run by the QRL. It is the highest level of junior rugby league in Brisbane before players move into senior rugby. FOGS in an acronym for Former Origin Greats.

The competition provides the highest standard for young players ranging 16-18 who wish to further their rugby league careers and is seen as the first step for young Queensland boys in reaching the National Rugby League. Although the competition is based in Brisbane, scouts from all the NRL clubs have a presence in Colts rugby. Players are chosen from the FOGS Cup for U17, U18, state, and national representative sides, and it is also the stepping stone to play in the Queensland Cup. It is not unusual for young stars in the FOGS Cup to have already signed contracts with an NRL side.

== History ==
The FOGS Colts Challenge, which ran from 1986 to 2017, only featured sides from south east Queensland. From 2008 to 2017, the National Rugby League (NRL) administered their own under-20 competition, the National Youth Competition, which featured the three Queensland-based NRL clubs, the Brisbane Broncos, Gold Coast Titans and North Queensland Cowboys, and a plethora of young players from the state. In 2016, the NRL announced that the National Youth Competition would be discontinued after the 2017 season, in favour of state-based under-20 competitions, administered by the Queensland Rugby League (QRL) and New South Wales Rugby League (NSWRL).

In 2017, while in preparation for the new competition, the QRL ran a shortened, statewide under-20 competition called the FOGS U20s Cup. The competition, which was won by the Redcliffe Dolphins, ran over nine-weeks, alongside the Mal Meninga Cup, and featured all 15 teams who would eventually participate in the Hastings Deering Colts.

== Current Teams ==
- Burleigh Bears
- Easts Tigers
- Ipswich Jets
- Norths Devils
- Redcliffe Dolphins
- Souths Logan Magpies
- Sunshine Coast Sea Eagles
- Tweed Heads Seagulls
- Toowoomba Clydesdales
- Wynnum-Manly Seagulls

== 2009 Ladder ==
	Team	Pld	W	D	L	B	PF	PA	PD	Pts
1	Souths Logan Magpies	20	16	1	3	2	548	350	+198	37
2	Easts Tigers	20	14	1	5	2	734	372	+362	33
3	Sunshine Coast Sea Eagles	20	13	3	4	2	489	398	+91	33
4	Tweed Heads Seagulls	20	11	1	8	2	487	425	+50	27
5	Western Districts Panthers	20	9	2	9	2	464	462	+2	24
6	Norths Devils	20	9	0	11	2	447	495	-48	22
7	Burleigh Bears	20	8	1	11	2	379	488	-109	21
8	Wynnum Manly Seagulls	20	6	0	14	2	422	596	-174	16
9	Ipswich Jets	20	5	0	15	2	349	522	-173	14
10	Redcliffe Dolphins	20	4	1	15	2	390	599	-209	13

== Grand Final Results ==
Year	Winner	Score	Loser
1998	Norths Devils	44 - 20	Past Brothers
1999	Redcliffe Dolphins	26 - 22	Norths Devils
2000	Norths Devils	32 - 14	Wests Panthers
2001	Redcliffe Dolphins	24 - 22	Norths Devils
2002	Wests Panthers	30 - 20	Redcliffe Dolphins
2003	Redcliffe Dolphins	24 - 20	Norths Devils
2004	Norths Devils	48 - 6	Easts Tigers
2005	Norths Devils	28 - 18	Wests Panthers
2006	Norths Devils	28 - 22	Wynnum-Manly Seagulls
2007	Tweed Heads Seagulls	18 - 14	Norths Devils
2008	Western Districts Panthers	30 - 16	Aspley Devils
2009	Easts Tigers	30 - 28	Souths Logan Magpies
2010	Easts Tigers	20 - 18	Wynnum-Manly Seagulls
2015	Burleigh Bears	22 - 12	Wynnum-Manly Seagulls
2016	Easts Tigers	21 - 20	Redcliffe Dolphins
2017	Redcliffe Dolphins	56 - 18	Norths Devils

== See also ==
- Rugby League Competitions in Australia
