= Central Highlands Rugby League (Queensland) =

Australian Rugby League

- Sport: Rugby league
- Instituted: 1920s
- Number of teams: 8
- Country: Australia
- Most titles: Emerald TIgers (11 titles)
- Website: www.qrl.com.au Central Highlands Rugby League

The Central Highlands Rugby League is a rugby league football competition in the Central Queensland region in Australia. The competition features 8 clubs who compete for the premiership across both men's,women's and U20's..

== Clubs ==
The Central Highlands Rugby League features nine clubs.

Central Highlands Rugby League
Colours	Club	Established	Home ground(s)	No. of A-Grade Premierships	A-Grade Premiership Years
	Blackwater Crushers		Hinricks Oval, Blackwater	5	1983, 1989, 1999, 2005, 2018
	Bluff Rabbitohs	1954	Macca's Oval, Bluff	2	2015, 2021
	Clermont Bears		Sportsground, Clermont	7	1993, 2006, 2007, 2013, 2014, 2022, 2024
	Dysart Bulls		Hickey Oval, Dysart	2	1984, 2019
	Emerald Brothers	1993	McIndoe Park, Emerald	4	1996, 1998, 2001, 2004
	Emerald Tigers	1968	McIndoe Park, Emerald	11	1972,1973,1978,1985, 1986, 1998, 2002, 2003, 2008, 2016, 2026
	Gemfield Giants(Now Defunct)		Roy Day Park	1	
	Middlemount Panthers		Norm Blanche Oval, Middlemount	4	1994, 2000, 2010, 2017
	Peak Downs Pirates(Now Defunct)		Langerak Park / Bridgeman Park, Peak Downs	3	2009, 2011, 2012
	Springsure Mountain Men		Bauhinia Park, Springsure	0	Nil

=== Former Teams ===
Notable Defunct Clubs: Bunyip (1997); Capella Roadrunners (2006); Gemfields Giants (2009 - Premiership 1997); Tieri (Premiership - 1995 then Renamed to Peak Downs Pirates and now defunct). Alpha Brumbies moved to Central West Rugby League in 2004. Emerald Brothers formerly known as Emerald Seagulls (Premiers 1996) and Emerald Cowboys (Premiers 1998 & 2001).

== Recent Premiers ==
=== Men's ===
A Grade Premiers Central Highlands Senior RL
Year	Premiers	Score	Runners up	MOM	Minor Premiers	Jim Gallagher Medal (Season B&F)
2026	Emerald Tigers	26-20	Clermont Bears	Jason King(ET)	Dysart Bulls	Steve Hardie(EB) & Sahlie Komndi(SM)
2025	Bluff Rabbitohs		Middlemount Panthers			
2024	Clermont Bears	18-16	Bluff Rabbitohs			
2023	Clermont Bears	42-14	Dysart Bulls			
2022	Clermont Bears	34-28	Dysart Bulls			
2021	Bluff Rabbitohs	40-18	Clermont Bears		Bluff Rabbitohs	
2020	No competition-Covid 19					
2019	Dysart Bulls	55-12	Bluff Rabbitohs	Clayton Kilpatrick(DB)	Dysart Bulls	Chris Conway (Bluff Rabbitohs)
2018	Blackwater Crushers	24 – 16	Bluff Rabbitohs	Josh Tanner(BW)	Bluff Rabbitohs	Brodee Barrett (Clermont Bears)
2017	Middlemount Panthers	34 – 22	Bluff Rabbitiohs			Ray Ebsworth (Springsure Mountain Men)
2016	Emerald Tigers	22 – 14	Middlemount Panthers	Meirana Parata(ET)	Emerald Tigers	Jared Owens (Springsure Mountain Men)
2015	Bluff Rabbitohs	36 – 20	Clermont Bears		Bluff Rabbitohs	Peter McLaughlin (Bluff Rabbitohs)
2014	Clermont Bears	48 – 38	Bluff Rabbitohs	Clayton Humphries(CB)	Bluff Rabbitohs	Brad Gorman (Blackwater Crushers)
2013	Clermont Bears	26-20	Emerald Tigers	Sean Haufe(CB)	Clermont Bears	Nick Deaves (Clermont Bears)
2012	Peak Downs Pirates	16-12	Clermont Bears	Mitch Wyatte(PD)	Clermont Bears	Todd Williams (Emerald Cowboys)
2011	Peak Downs Pirates		Dysart Bulls		Dysart Bulls	Logan Sullivan (Dysart Bulls)
2010	Middlemount Panthers		Blackwater Crushers		Clermont Bears	Ryan Douglas (Emerald Tigers)
2009	Peak Downs Pirates	42-32	Middlemount Panthers		Peak Downs Pirates	Mitch Wyatte (Peak Downs Pirates)
2008	Emerald Tigers		Peak Downs Pirates		Peak Downs Pirates	Mitch Wyatte (Peak Downs Pirates)
2007	Clermont Bears		Emerald Tigers		Blackwater Crushers	Clayton Humphreys (Clermont Bears)
2006	Clermont Bears		Blackwater Crushers		Clermont Bears	Brendon Finger (Clermont Bears)
2005	Blackwater Crushers		Middlemount Panthers		Middlemount Panthers	Jason Randell (Middlemount Panthers)
2004	Emerald Cowboys		Blackwater Crushers	RJ Stewart(EC)	Blackwater Crushers	Steven Henderson (Middlemount Panthers)
2003	Emerald Tigers		Emerald Cowboys		Emerald Tigers	Travis Ness (Emerald Tigers)
2002	Emerald Tigers		Middlemount Panthers		Emerald Tigers	Kurt Sullivan (Peak Downs Pirates)
2001	Emerald Cowboys		Middlemount Panthers		Emerald Cowboys	Greg Dann (Middlemount Panthers)
2000	Middlemount Panthers		Emerald Cowboys		Emerald Cowboys	Fabian Colley (Middlemount Panthers)
1999	Blackwater Crushers		Middlemount Panthers		Middlemount Panthers	Craig Baguley (Middlemount Panthers)
1998	Emerald Cowboys		Blackwater Crushers		Middlemount Panthers	Terry Benson (Dysart Bulls)
1997	Gemfields Giants		Middlemount Panthers		Middlemount Panthers	Tony Caffrey (Emerald Cowboys)
1996	Emerald Seagulls	21-12	Middlemount Panthers		Clermont Bears	Steven Bell (Emerald Seagulls)
1995	Tieri Eagles	21-14	Middlemount Panthers		Middlemount Panthers	Jason Jackson (Gemfields Giants)
1994	Middlemount Panthers		Tieri Eagles			Scott Sewell (Emerald Tigers)
1993	Clermont Bears		Bluff Rabbitohs			Phil Jarvis (Peak Downs Pirates)
1992	Dysart Bulls		Clermont Bears			
1991	Clermont Bears		Bluff Rabbitohs			
1990	Bluff Rabbitohs		Middlemount Panthers			
1989						
1988						
1987	Blackwater Devils		Blackwater Centrals			
1986	Emerald Tigers				Emerald Tigers	
1985	Emerald Tigers		Blackwater Devils		Emerald Tigers	
1984					Moranbah Sharks	
1983	Blackwater Centrals		Emerald Tigers		Blackwater Centrals	
1982					Blackwater Centrals	
1981					Blackwater Centrals	
1980					Blackwater Centrals	
1979					Moranbah Sharks	
1978	Emerald Tigers	20-8	Blackwater/Bluff	Mick McGuane(ET)		
1977					Dysart Bulls	
1976					Blackwater Devils	
1975					Clermont Bears	
1974					Moranbah Sharks	
1973	Moranbah Nuggets		Clermont Bears		Moranbah Sharks	
1972	Emerald Tigers	31-10	Clermont Bears	Monty Gilmore(ET)	Emerald Tigers	
1971	Clermont Bears				Clermont Bears	
1970					Springsure Mountainmen	
1969					Emerald Tigers	

=== Women's ===
Central West Women's Premiers
Year	Premiers	Score	Runners up	MOM	Minor Premiers	Best and Fairest
2026	Emerald Tigers Ladies	34-26	Dysart Bulls		Emerald Tigers	
2025	Emerald Tigers Ladies	30-4	Blackwater Crushettes		Emerald Tigers	
2024	Emerald Tigers Ladies	60 – 0	Bluff Rabbitohs		Emerald Tigers	
2023	Emerald Tigers Ladies	34 – 0	Blackwater Crushettes		Emerald Tigers	
2022	Blackwater Crushettes	38 – 0	Bluff Rabbitohs			
2021	No competition					
2020	No competition					
2019	Blackwater Crushettes	26 – 12	Emerald Brothers Cowgirls			
2018	Blackwater Crushettes	22 – 16	Emerald Cowgirls			
2017	Clermont Bears Ladies	34-16	Blackwater Crushettes			Miranda Davidson (Blackwater Crushers)
2016	Emerald Tigers Ladies		Clermont Bears Ladies			Kelsie Parter (Emerald Tigers)
2015	Clermont Bears Ladies		Emerald Tigers Ladies			Elle Waters (Clermont Bears)
2014	Emerald Tigers Ladies	10 – 6	Clermont Bears Ladies	Casey Watkins(ET)		Elle Stitt (Clermont Bears)

Central Highlands JRL
Central Highlands Junior Rugby League
- Blackwater Crushers
- Central West
- Clermont Bears
- Dysart Bulls
- Emerald Brothers
- Emerald Tigers
- Gemfields Giants(Defunct)
- Moranbah(Now in Mackay Comp
- Middlemount Panthers
- Peak Downs Pirates
- Springsure Mountain Men

== See also ==
- Queensland Rugby League Central Division
