= Cyril Connell =

Cyril Connell may refer to:

- Cyril Connell, Snr. (1899–1974), former rugby league footballer, administrator and university registrar
- Cyril Connell, Jr. (1928–2009), former rugby league five-eighth, former scout for Brisbane Broncos
