= Queensland Rugby League Northern Division =

Australian sport administrating body

Northern Division
- Current season or competition: Foley Shield
- Sport: Rugby league
- Instituted: 1909
- Country: Australia; Queensland
- Related competition: Central Division; South-East Division

The Northern Division of the Queensland Rugby League is responsible for administering the game of rugby league in North Queensland, specifically in the area from Sarina in the south to Cape York and the Torres Strait Islands in the north and west to Mount Isa as well as into the Gulf Communities. There are over 8000 registered players across 36 senior clubs and 39 junior clubs in this division. The Northern Division is responsible for the historic Foley Shield competition that is held each year. Mid West and Mount Isa play in the Toyota Outback Carnival.

== Team of the Century ==
In 2008, the centennial year of rugby league football in Australia, the Northern Division named its team of the century:

- 1. Ray Laird (Mackay, NQ, Qld, Aus)
- 2. Kerry Boustead (Innisfail, NQ, Qld, Aus)
- 3. Alan Gil (Cairns, NQ, Qld, Aus)
- 4. Garry Wellington (Burdekin, Herbert River, Qld, Aus)
- 5. Dale Shearer (Sarina, NQ, Qld, Aus)
- 6. Bob Banks (Charters Towers, Tully, Cairns, NQ, Qld, Aus)
- 7. Arch Foley (Townsville, NQ, Qld – career cut short by World War I)
- 8. Martin Bella (Sarina, NQ, Qld, Aus)
- 9. Brian Fitzsimmons (Cairns, Ayr, Qld, Aus)
- 10. Dan Clifford (Tully, NQ, Qld)
- 11. Jim Paterson (Townsville, Innisfail, Herbert River, NQ, Qld, Aus)
- 12. Angelo Crema (Tully, NQ, Qld, Aus)
- 13. Kel O'Shea (Ayr, Qld, NSW, Aus)
- Reserves:
- 14. Lionel Williamson (Innisfail, NQ, Qld, Aus)
- 15. Matt Bowen (NQ Cowboys, Qld, Aus)
- 16. Marshall Colwell (Mackay, Townsville, NQ, Qld)
- 17. Greg Dowling (Herbert River, Innisfail, NQ, Qld, Aus)

== Competitions ==
=== Cairns District Rugby League ===
The C.D.R.L (The Marlins) is the governing body for the Cairns eleven club senior competition, which has three grades: A-grade, reserves and colts (under 18's). All finals matches are played at Barlow Park.

Cairns is represented in the Queensland Cup and Mal Meninga Cup (Under 18's) state leagues by the Northern Pride. The competition was renamed the Far North Queensland Rugby League in 2020.

The region's representative teams are known as the Marlins.

=== Mackay & District Rugby League ===
The Mackay & District Rugby League runs an eight club senior competition of three grades, A-Grade, reserve grade and colts (under 18's) and selects representative sides also represented in the Queensland Cup and Mal Meninga Cup (Under 18's) state leagues by the Mackay Cutters.

The region's representative teams are known as the Sea Eagles.

=== Mid West Rugby League ===
The Mid West Rugby League is a competition played North Western Queensland, Australia under the auspices of the Queensland Rugby League Northern Division.

The league features six clubs and runs an A-Grade competition for both Men and Women, as well as Junior competitions in the Under 9s, 12s and 16s grades. Uniquely, rounds are played as "musters", where all teams travel to one location for the entire round of games due to the vast travel distances and low population density of the area. This model has since been adopted by other competitions including the Western Riverina Community Cup and Mid West Cup in neighbouring New South Wales.

==== Clubs ====
Mid West Rugby League
Colours	Club	Established	Home ground(s)	No. of A-Grade Premierships	A-Grade Premiership Years
	Cloncurry Eagles		Cloncurry Sports Ground		
	Doomadgee Dragons		Doomadgee Sports Ground		
	Hughenden Eagles		Hughenden Sports Ground		
	Julia Creek Saints		Julia Creek Sports Ground		
	Normanton Stingers		Normanton Sports Ground		
	Richmond Tigers		Richmond Sports Ground		

==== Recent Premiers ====
Mid West Rugby League Premierships

A-Grade

- 2023: Normanton
- 2024: Normanton

==== Juniors ====
Mid West JRL clubs
- Cloncurry
- Hughenden
- Julia Creek
- Richmond
- Normanton (juniors in recess)

=== Mount Isa Rugby League ===
The Mount Isa Rugby League is a competition played the vicinity of Mount Isa, Queensland, Australia under the auspices of the Queensland Rugby League Northern Division.

Founded in 1929, the league features six clubs and runs competitions in grades from Under 6s-Under 12s and an A-Grade for both Men and Women, with three teams participating in the premier competition in both the Men's and Women's grades.

Two foundation clubs remain from the 1929 season, the Black Star Diehards and the Mount Isa Brothers.

==== Clubs ====
Mount Isa Rugby League
Colours	Club	Established	Home ground(s)	No. of A-Grade Premierships	A-Grade Premiership Years
A Grade
	Mount Isa Brothers	1929	Alec Inch Oval, Mount Isa		
	Mount Isa Townies		Alec Inch Oval, Mount Isa		
	Mount Isa Wanderers	1953	Alec Inch Oval, Mount Isa		
Women's
	Black Star Diehards Mt Isa	1929	Alec Inch Oval, Mount Isa	20	1932, 1933, 1935, 1936, 1947, 1948, 1952, 1954, 1957, 1962, 1964, 1973, 1976, 1979, 1983, 1984, 1985, 1987, 2010 & 2013
	Cloncurry Eagles		Cloncurry Showground		
	Wranglers RLFC Mount Isa		Alec Inch Oval, Mount Isa		

==== Recent Premiers ====
Mount Isa Rugby League Premierships

A-Grade

- 2013: Black Star
- 2014: Wanderers
- 2015: Wanderers
- 2016: Cloncurry
- 2017: Townies
- 2018: Townies
- 2019: Townies
- 2020: Wanderers
- 2021: Cancelled due to COVID-19
- 2022: Wanderers
- 2023: Wanderers
- 2024: Townies

=== Remote Areas Rugby League ===
Remote Areas Rugby League
Colours	Club	Established	Home ground(s)	No. of A-Grade Premierships	A-Grade Premiership Years
	Aurukun Kang Kang				
	Central Cape Suns				
	Cooktown Crocs				
	Hope Vale Cockatoos				
	Lockhart River Scorpions				
	Mulga Tigers				
	Napranum Bulldogs				
	Old Mapoon				
	Pormpuraaw Crocs				
	Weipa Raiders				
	Wujal Wujal Yindili				
	Zenadth Kes RLFC				

==== Zenadth Kes Rugby League ====
- Mulga Tigers
- Suburbs
- Roosters (est 2004)
- Pioneer Knights (est 2004)

=== Townsville District Rugby League ===
The Townsville District Rugby League runs an eight club senior competition of three grades: A-Grade, reserve grade, under 19's and colts (under 18's).

The league selects representative teams to compete in the yearly Foley Shield and Mal Meninga Cup (Under 18's) state league as the Townsville Stingers.

== Major Venues ==
- Barlow Park - Cairns (18,000 / 3,750 Grandstand seating)
- BB Print Stadium - Mackay (12,000 / 1,050 Grandstand seating)
- Jack Manski Oval - Townsville (4,000 / 250 Grandstand seating)
- Queensland Country Bank Stadium - Townsville (25,000 / 25,000 Grandstand seating)

== See also ==
- Rugby league in Queensland
