= South East Poinsettias =

South East Poinsettias is the name of the southeast division of the Queensland Rugby League. They run competitions such as "The Mixwell Cup," which is the division below the Queensland Cup, and "The Mixwell Colts."

Teams participating in The Mixwell Cup and The Mixwell Colts
Burleigh Bears
Easts Tigers
Hills District Panthers
Ipswich Jets
Norths Devils
Redcliffe Dolphins
Runaway Bay Seagulls
Souths Logan Magpies
Tugun Seahawks
Wests Panthers
Wynnum-Manly Seagulls

Brothers-Valleys participated until the end of the 2004, with Hills District Panthers and the Tugun Seahawks entering.
