= Queensland Rugby League Central Division =

Rugby league

Central Division
- Current season or competition: 47th Battalion Shield
- Sport: Rugby league
- Formerly known as: Central Rugby League; South West Rugby League; Wide Bay Rugby League
- Instituted: 2010
- Country: Australia; Queensland
- Related competition: Northern Division; South-East Division

The Central Division of the Queensland Rugby League is responsible for the promotion, administration, and facilitation of rugby league throughout most of regional Queensland. Regional areas include the Darling Downs, Wide Bay–Burnett, the South West, the Central West, and Fitzroy & Mackay.

The Division was formed in 2010 as part of an amalgamation between the Central, South West, and Wide Bay divisions. Shortly after the amalgamation, three Regions of the Central Rugby League were established. The Division's three regions are the Capricorn Region, responsible for the former Central Division, the South West Region, responsible for the former South West Division, and the Wide Bay Region responsible for the former Wide Bay Division.

== 47th Battalion Shield ==
- Bundaberg
- Central Highlands
- Gladstone
- Northern Wide Bay
- Rockhampton
- South West Country
- Sunshine Coast
- Toowoomba

47th Battalion Shield: Under 20s

- Bundaberg
- Central Highlands
- Gladstone
- Rockhampton
- Qld Outback
- South Burnett

47th Battalion Shield: Women's

- Bundaberg
- Capras
- Mustangs
- Sunshine Coast

Like the Northern Division's "Foley Shield" or the South-East Division's "Bulimba Cup" the "47th Battalion Shield" is run as a regional Carnival and none of the teams are club teams, with the only exception being some of the Women's teams. Its traditionally held over one weekend and normally at one venue with multiple grounds to play on.

Carnival Competition Rules
Carnival Competition Rules

Period of Play:

- Each match will be played in 2 × 25 minute halves with NO time off for injuries.
- The referee may signal time off in the last 10 minutes of the 2nd half at his or her discretion.
- A half-time break of 10 minutes will be allowed for all matches.

Players:

- All competing squads will comprise a maximum of 25 people, including no more than 20 players.
- All 20 players may play in any match on an unlimited interchange basis.
- To be eligible to play at the Carnival, a player must have played in at least 1 Local League fixture match in the current season.
- Any player whose name has appeared on the Match Report sheet for more than three (3) Queensland Cup matches in the current season is ineligible to play at the Carnival.
- Each team must complete a Match Report sheet for each match it participates in.
- A player must play in the same jersey number as the program in every match irrespective of position played. (replacement players take the jersey number in the program of the person they replaced).
- An interchange player must report to a Touch Judge and must not enter the field of play until such time as the player he is interchanging has left the field.

Competition Points:

- Points will be awarded for each match as follows
- Win = 3 points
- Draw = 1½ points
- Loss = 0 points
- Most points scored 1st half = 1 point
- Most points scored 2nd half = 1 point
- If a match is cancelled, each team will be awarded 2½ points.

If teams are tied on points at the conclusion of all matches, their final standings will be determined as follows:

- (i) Most wins, then (if equal)
- (ii) Points For and Against, then (if equal)
- (iii) Most tries scored, then (if equal)
- (iv) Least penalties incurred

General:

- All matches will be played in accordance with the International Laws of the Game, the ARL On-Field Policy, and any other such Rules as might apply.
- Player misconduct during the course of the Carnival will be dealt with forthwith by a Judiciary Tribunal comprising 3 independent persons. QRL Rules 33–64 apply except that the time limitations stated in Rules 44 and 45 shall be suspended.

== Capricorn Region ==
The Capricorn Region of the Queensland Rugby League Central Division is responsible for administering the game of rugby league in the Central area of Queensland under the QRL. Formally known as the Central Division until 2010 when it was amalgamated with the South West & Wide Bay divisions to form the current Central Division.

The Region's boundaries take in Miriam Vale and Gladstone to the south, out to Winton in the west and north to Moranbah. There are 3150 players in this region, playing for 25 senior clubs and 32 junior clubs. The Division has four senior Local Leagues. Additionally, Central Region club, Moura, played in the Central Burnett competition until recently becoming defunct. Another Club, Tambo, plays in the Western League competition in the South West Region. The Division is represented by the Central Queensland Capras in the Queensland Cup and formerly also in the Winfield State League.

Central Division Team of the Century (1908-2008)
First team squad		Coaching staff
1 Ray Laird (?) – FB; 2 Alan McIndoe (Emerald Tigers-CH) – WG; 3 Matt McCoy (?) – CE; 4 'Sugar' Ray Robinson (?) – CE; 5 Matt Sing (Dysart Bulls-CH) – WG; 6 Darren Lockyer (?) – FE; 7 Cyril Connell, Jr. (Rockhampton) – HB; 8 Duncan Hall (Rockhampton) – PR; 9 Brian Fitzsimmons (?) – HK; 10 John Wittenberg (?) – PR; 11 Rod Reddy (Rockhampton) – SR; 12 Gary Larson (Gladstone) – SR; 13 Ian Thinee (?) – LK	14 Peter Apps (?); 15 Jack Kelly (?); 16 Greg Reynolds (?); 17 PJ Marsh (Blackwater Crushers-CH)	Head coach: Not named; Legend: (c) Captain(s); (vc) Vice-captain(s)

Notice: The names listed in the brackets above represent the league the player was from and not the club(s) the player was from. No Coach or Captain was named. Had to play at senior level (excludes Central Division Juniors such as Jason Hetherington who left before senior level).

=== Rockhampton Senior Local Rugby League ===
The Rockhampton District Rugby League (RDRL) is the administrative body for the game of rugby league football in Rockhampton, Queensland. Formed in 1918 and a part of the Queensland Rugby League's Central Division, the RDRL runs senior, junior and women's club competitions and has its headquarters at Browne Park. The competition changed its name to Rockhampton Senior Local Rugby League in 2018.

The local senior competition was established in 1918, and continued with just Rockhampton based clubs until it merged with the Gladstone District Rugby League in 2024.

The league's representative team is known as the Rustlers.

=== Central Highlands Rugby League ===
The Central Highlands Rugby League is a rugby league football competition in the Central Queensland region in Australia. The competition features eight clubs who compete for the premiership across both men's and women's grades.

=== Central West Rugby League ===
The Central West Rugby League is a rugby league football competition in Queensland, Australia. The competition is run by the Queensland Rugby League, and features five teams, who compete for the Wellshot Hotel Senior Men's Premiership. The league formerly had six clubs, before the Longreach Tigers and Ilfracombe Scorpions merged in 2017 to form Longreach-Ilfracombe Tigers. The representative team is known as the Teamsters.

== South West Region ==
The South West Region of the Queensland Rugby League Central Division is responsible for administering the game of rugby league in the Southern area of Queensland under the QRL. Formally known as the South West Division until 2010 when it was amalgamated with the Central & Wide Bay divisions to form the current Central Division.

It is also responsible for the Toowoomba Clydesdales team who compete in the Queensland Cup (and formerly the Winfield State League), and the Toowoomba Fillies women's Rugby League team. The representative side, South West Mustangs, currently wear Blue, Gold and White jerseys.

South West Division Team of the Century (1908-2008)
First team squad		Coaching staff
1 Darren Lockyer (Roma) – FB; 2 Des McGovern (?) – WG; 3 Tom Gorman (Toowoomba) – CE; 4 John McDonald (Toowoomba) – CE; 5 Michael Hancock (Toowoomba) – WG; 6 Bob Banks (Toowoomba) – FE; 7 Duncan Thompson (Toowoomba) – HB; 8 Herb Steinohrt (Toowoomba) – PR; 9 Dan Dempsey (Toowoomba) – HK; 10 Mick Madsen (Toowoomba) – PR; 11 Arthur Beetson (Roma) – SR; 12 Duncan Hall (Toowoomba) – SR; 13 Elton Rasmussen (Toowoomba) – LK	14 Ian "Ripper" Doyle (?); 15 Vic Armbruster (Toowoomba); 16 John Gleeson (Toowoomba); 17 Pat McMahon (Toowoomba)	Head coach: Duncan Thompson (Toowoomba); Legend: (c) Captain(s); (vc) Vice-captain(s)

Notice: The names listed in the brackets above represent the league the player was from and not the club(s) the player was from. No Captain was named.

=== Border Rivers Rugby League ===
The Border Rivers Rugby League is a rugby league football competition based in South West Queensland, Australia. The competition features five clubs competing across two grades, Senior Men's and Senior Women's Tag.

==== Clubs ====
Border Rivers Rugby League Clubs
Colours	Club	Town	Home ground(s)	No. of A-Grade Premierships	A-Grade Premiership Years
	Inglewood Roosters	Inglewood	MacIntyre Sports Complex		
	MacIntyre Warriors	Boggabilla (NSW)	Boggabilla Sports Ground		
	Stanthorpe Gremlins	Stanthorpe	Sullivan Oval		
	Tenterfield Tigers	Tenterfield (NSW)	Rugby League Park		
	Texas Terriers	Texas	Reg Saunders Oval		

==== Recent Premiers ====
Border Rivers Rugby League Premierships

A-Grade

- 2021: Tenterfield
- 2022: Texas
- 2023: Inglewood
- 2024: Texas

=== Roma District Rugby League ===
The Roma District Rugby League is a competition in the Maranoa district of South West Queensland, Australia, run under the auspices of the Queensland Rugby League. The competition was established in 1914, and features seven clubs competing across four grades (u16,u18, reserve and A grade).

There is also a Junior Roma and District Rugby league competition with grades from u6s-u14s. THe clubs that compete in these leagues are Roma saints, ST. George RLFC, Miles Devils (Miles Devils only has a team in u14s RDJRL League ,as the miles devils u6s-u12 compete in the Western downs junior rugby league), Carnarvon Cubs, Benderoo Bulls, Mitchell magpies.

The league fields a joint representative team with other leagues in the region known as the South West Stockmen.

=== Toowoomba Rugby League ===
The Toowoomba Rugby League is a competition involving football clubs from the city of Toowoomba and surrounding towns and districts. Established in 1919, the competition features twelve clubs competing across three men's and one women's grade.

The representative teams are known as the Clydesdales and wear blue and red jerseys.

== Wide Bay Region ==
The Wide Bay Region of the Queensland Rugby League Central Division is responsible for administering the game of rugby league in the Wide Bay area of Queensland under the QRL. Formally known as the Wide Bay Division until 2010 when it was amalgamated with the Central & South West divisions to form the current Central Division.

The Wide Bay Bulls had previously represented the division in the 1980s and 1990s in the Winfield State League. At that time they wore Mustard and Dark Brown jerseys. They currently wear Red, Black and White jerseys. The Sunshine Coast Falcons currently represent the division in the Queensland Cup.

Wide Bay Division Team of the Century (1908-2008)
First team squad		Coaching staff
1 Ian Pearce (South Burnett) – FB; 2 Les Kiss (Bundaberg) – WG; 3 Noel Hazzard (Bundaberg) – CE; 4 Rex McGlynn (c) (Bundaberg) – CE; 5 Brad Backer (Fraser Coast) – WG; 6 Frank Fisher (South Burnett) – FE; 7 James Ward (Sunshine Coast) – HB; 8 Gary Pearson (Fraser Coast) – PR; 9 Noel Gallagher (Bundaberg) – HK; 10 Norm Potter (Fraser Coast) – PR; 11 Bryan Niebling (South Burnett) – SR; 12 Tom Duggan (South Burnett) – SR; 13 Col Weiss (Bundaberg) – LK	14 Phil Braithwaite (South Burnett); 15 Mick Plant (Sunshine Coast); 16 Don Nixon (Bundaberg); 17 Brad Kennedy (Gympie)	Head coach: Rex McGlynn (c) (Bundaberg); Legend: (c) Captain(s); (vc) Vice-captain(s)

Notice: The names listed in the brackets above represent the league the player was from and not the club(s) the player was from.

=== Bundaberg Rugby League ===
The Bundaberg Rugby League is a rugby league competition in the Wide Bay and Fraser Coast regions of Queensland, Australia. Headquartered in Bundaberg, the competition was founded in 1913, and features six clubs competing across three senior grades. The Bundaberg Rugby League has two junior competitions; the Bundaberg Junior Rugby League and the Fraser Coast Junior Rugby League. Some of the clubs in these leagues field senior sides in the Northern Districts Rugby League competition.

Bundaberg representative teams are known as the Bears and wear red and black jerseys.

=== Central Burnett Rugby League ===
The Central Burnett Rugby League is a rugby league football competition based in the Northern half of the Burnett region of Queensland, Australia. The competition features four clubs competing across four junior and one Senior Grade (A-Grade).

The league fields a joint representative side with the South Burnett Rugby League called the Burnett Brahmans.

==== Clubs ====
Central Burnett Rugby League Clubs
Colours	Club	Established	Home ground(s)	No. of A-Grade Premierships	A-Grade Premiership Years
	Biggenden Warriors		Biggenden Sports Ground		
	Eidsvold Eagles		Eidsvold Show & Sports Grounds		
	Gayndah Gladiators	1915	Gayndah Sports Ground	7	2017, 2018, 2019, 2021, 2022, 2023, 2024
	Monto Roos	1963	Monto Combined Sports Complex	1	2015
	Mundubbera Tigers	1921	Archer Park, Mundubbera	2	2014, 2016

==== Recent Premiers ====
Central Burnett Rugby League Premierships

A-Grade

- 2014: Mundubbera
- 2015: Monto
- 2016: Mundubbera
- 2017: Gayndah
- 2018: Gayndah
- 2019: Gayndah
- 2020: No competition
- 2021: Gayndah
- 2022: Gayndah
- 2023: Gayndah
- 2024: Gayndah

=== Northern Districts Rugby League ===
The Northern Districts Rugby League is a rugby league football competition based in the Northern Wide Bay region of Queensland, Australia. The competition features eight clubs across two grades, Senior Men's and Senior Women's Tag.

==== Clubs ====
Northern Districts Rugby League Clubs
Colours	Club	Established	Home ground(s)	No. of A-Grade Premierships	A-Grade Premiership Years
	Agnes Water Marlins	2011	Discovery Coast Sports Ground	0	Nil
	Avondale Tigers	1920s	Avondale	3	2013, 2016, 2017
	Gin Gin Hawks		Gin Gin	1	2009
	Calliope Roosters	1960	Calliope	0	Nil
	Isis Devils		Childers	2	2023, 2024
	Miriam Vale Magpies	1966	Gary Larson Oval	5	2005, 2008, 2010, 2011, 2022
	South Kolan Sharks		South Kolan	3	?
	Wallabys Gladstone	1923	Gladstone	0	Nil

==== Recent Premiers ====
Northern Districts Rugby League Premierships

A-Grade

- 2009: Gin Gin
- 2010: Miriam Vale
- 2011: Miriam Vale 38 South Kolan 34
- 2012:
- 2013:
- 2014: South Kolan 30 Avondale 26
- 2015: South Kolan 50 Miriam Vale 14
- 2016: Avondale 26 Gin Gin 6
- 2017: Avondale 54 Gin Gin 16
- 2018: Miriam Vale 18 South Kolan 12
- 2019:
- 2020:
- 2021: South Kolan 22 Gin Gin 4
- 2022: Miriam Vale 34 South Kolan 24
- 2023: Isis Devils 46 South Kolan 14
- 2024: Isis Devils 26 Gladstone Wallabies 22

=== South Burnett Rugby League ===
The South Burnett Rugby League is a competition played in Queensland, Australia under the auspices of the Queensland Rugby League Central Division. Featuring five senior and six junior clubs, the league runs competitions in grades from Under 6s-Under 12s and an A-Grade, with combined Under 14s, 16s and 18s (known as the Eagles) sides travelling to play in the Toowoomba Rugby League and Bundaberg Rugby League competitions.

The league fields a joint representative side with the Central Burnett Rugby League called the Burnett Brahmans.

=== Sunshine Coast Gympie Rugby League ===
The Sunshine Coast Gympie Rugby League is the local rugby league competition on Australia's Sunshine Coast. Through SCGRL Limited it serves as the governing body for rugby league on the Sunshine Coast. The SCGRL Premiership currently has 16 clubs across the senior and junior divisions. While some clubs field teams in the junior and senior divisions, not all clubs are in the junior division and not all clubs are in the senior division.

The league's representative teams are known as the Falcons like the region's Queensland Cup side.

== Former Leagues ==
=== Gladstone District Rugby League ===
The Gladstone District Rugby League (GDRL) is a former rugby league competition in Gladstone, Queensland, run by the Queensland Rugby League. The competition, founded in 1918, folded in 2024 after going into recess from 2017 to 2021.

The competition still runs junior grades and fields representative teams, known as the Gladstone Raiders.

Gladstone District Rugby League (1918–1921; 1923–1941; 1944–1960; 1966–2016; 2022–present) / Previously known as "Port Curtis Rugby League" (1918-1952)
Club	Est.	City / Town	Home ground(s)	Seasons
Calliope Roosters	1960	Calliope	Liz Cunningham Park	1960–1961; ^; 1991–1992; 2013–2016; 2022–present
Past Brothers Gladstone	1930	Gladstone	Briffney Creek Fields	1930–1932; 1968–2015; 2022-present
Tannum Sands Seagulls	1994	Boyne Island-Tannum Sands	Dennis Park	1994–2015; 2022–present
Valleys Diehards	1919	Gladstone	Valleys Grounds	1919–1941; 1944–1961; 1966–2008; ^; 2010–2015; 2022–present
Wallabys	1923	Gladstone	Albion Park	1923–1941; 1944–1951; 1954–1961; 1966–1983; 1993–2008; ^; 2010–2016; 2022–present

=== Western Rugby League ===
Western Rugby League Clubs
Colours	Club	Town	Home ground(s)	No. of A-Grade Premierships	A-Grade Premiership Years
	Augathella Meat Ants	Augathella	Augathella Sports Ground		2017
	Charleville Comets	Charleville	Charleville Sports Ground		
	Cunnamulla Rams	Cunnamulla	Cunnamulla Sports Ground		
	Quilpie Magpies	Quilpie	Quilpie Sports Ground		

== Major Venues ==
- Browne Park – Rockhampton (8,000 / 5,200 Grandstand seating)
- Clive Berghofer Stadium – Toowoomba (9,000 / 2,300 Grandstand seating)
- Marley Brown Oval – Gladstone (6,000 / 1,000 Grandstand seating)
- Salter Oval – Bundaberg (8,000 / 500 Grandstand seating)
- Sunshine Coast Stadium – Kawana Waters (12,000 / 1,500 Grandstand Seating)

== See also ==
- Rugby league in Queensland
