= South Burnett Rugby League =

Rugby league in Queensland, Australia

- Sport: Rugby league
- Country: Australia
- Premiers: Murgon Mustangs (2024)
- Most titles: Cherbourg Hornets (10 titles)
- Website: SBRL at SportsTG

The South Burnett Rugby League is a competition played in Queensland, Australia under the auspices of the Queensland Rugby League Central Division.

Featuring five senior and six junior clubs, the league runs competitions in grades from Under 6s-Under 12s and an A-Grade, with combined Under 14s, 16s and 18s sides travelling to play in the Toowoomba Rugby League and Bundaberg Rugby League competitions.

== Clubs ==
There are five senior and six junior clubs in the South Burnett Rugby League.

South Burnett Rugby League
Colours	Club	Established	Home ground(s)	No. of A-Grade Premierships	A-Grade Premiership Years
	Cherbourg Hornets	1930s	Cherbourg	10	1983, 1988, 1989, 1997, 2001, 2010, 2012, 2013, 2016, 2021
	Kingaroy Red Ants	1920	Kingaroy	3	1999, 2015, 2023
	Murgon Mustangs	1920	Murgon	7	1990, 1991, 2003, 2017, 2019, 2022, 2024
	Nanango Stags	1949	Nanango	5	1984, 1987, 2000, 2002, 2018
	Wondai-Proston Wolves		Wondai / Proston	9	1985, 1986, 1995, 1996, 1995, 1996, 1998, 2011, 2014

=== Former clubs ===
- Blackbutt-Yarraman Timbertowners

South Burnett Junior Rugby League
South Burnett Junior Rugby League
- Blackbutt-Yarraman Timbertowners
- Cherbourg Hornets
- Kingaroy Red Ants
- Murgon Mustangs
- Nanango Stags
- Wondai Proston Wolves

== Premiers ==
Grand Final results compiled from scores published in the Rugby League Week.

Season	Grand Final Information				Minor Premiers
Season	Premiers	Score	Runners-up	Report	Minor Premiers
1983	Cherbourg	45–34	Wondai
1984	Nanango	17–6	Wondai
1985	Wondai	24–22	Murgon
1986	Wondai	12–6	Nanango		Wondai
1987	Nanango	20–18	Murgon		Murgon
1988	Cherbourg	28–20	Nanango
1989	Cherbourg	65–26	Wondai
1990	Murgon	16–15	Cherbourg
1991	Murgon	30–21	Cherbourg
1992-94 Unknown
1995	Wondai	60–16	Nanango
1996	Wondai	34–26	Cherbourg
1997	Cherbourg	44–2	Blackbutt-Yarraman
1998	Wondai	37–16	Blackbutt-Yarraman
1999	Kingaroy	32–26	Cherbourg
2000	Nanango	50–24	Murgon		Nanango
2001	Cherbourg	18–14	Kingaroy
2002	Nanango	38–22	Kingaroy
2003	Murgon	46–10	Kingaroy
2004-2011 Unknown
2012	Cherbourg	–	Kingaroy
2013	Cherbourg	40–14	Wondai
2014 Unknown
2015	Kingaroy	26–24	Wondai	SBT	Wondai
2016	Cherbourg	68–20	Nanango	SBT
2017	Murgon	44–42	Cherbourg	SBT, QRL	Murgon
2018	Nanango	48–0	Kingaroy	SBT	Nanango
2019	Murgon	28–14	Cherbourg	QRL	Murgon
2020	No competition due to COVID-19 pandemic
2021	Cherbourg	40–24	Murgon	PRL	Nanango
2022	Murgon	36–10	Nanango	PRL	Nanango
2023	Kingaroy	28–12	Cherbourg	PRL	Kingaroy
2024	Murgon	26–24	Nanango	BFBF	Cherbourg

== External links and sources ==
- Rugby League Week at State Library of NSW Research and Collections
- The centenary of the greatest game under the sun : one hundred years of Rugby League in Queensland, Prof. Maxwell Howell, Celebrity Books, 2008.
- History of the South Burnett Rugby League on Facebook
