= Roma District Rugby League =

Australian rugby competition

- Sport: Rugby league
- Instituted: 1914
- Inaugural season: 1914
- Country: Australia
- Premiers: Chinchilla Bulldogs (2018)
- Most titles: Roma Cities Gladiators (22 titles)
- Website: SportsSG – Roma

The Roma District Rugby League is a competition in the Maranoa district of South West Queensland, Australia, run under the auspices of the Queensland Rugby League.

== History ==
The Roma District Rugby League was established in 1914.

Rugby League Immortal Arthur Beetson played for the Roma Cities Gladiators, before moving to play for Redcliffe in the Brisbane Rugby League and Balmain, Eastern Suburbs and Parramatta in the NSWRFL Premiership, in addition to captaining New South Wales in the residency-based Interstate Series, Queensland in State of Origin, and becoming the first ever Indigenous captain of the Kangaroos.

The Western Rugby League folded in 2021, with the remaining clubs, Charleville and Cunnamulla, forming a combined side, known as the Western Ringers, who entered into the Roma competition from 2022.

== Clubs ==
=== Current ===
| Club | City | Home ground(s) | No. of A-Grade Premierships | A-Grade Premiership Years |
|---|---|---|---|---|
| Chinchilla Bulldogs | Chinchilla | Bulldog Park | 7 | 1996, 1998, 2010–11, 2014–15, 2018 |
| Roma Cities Gladiators | Roma | Arthur Beetson Oval | 13 | 1983, 1990, 1992, 1995, 2000, 2003–04, 2016–17, 2019, 2021–22, 2024 |
| Miles Devils | Miles | Centenary Oval | 1 | 2013 |
| Mitchell Magpies | Mitchell | Mitchell RSL Sporting Complex | 2 | 2002,2023 |
| St George Dragons | St George | Rowden Park | 4 | 2001, 2005, 2007–09 |
| Taroom-Wandoan Battlers (Reserves Only) | Taroom & Wandoan | Ross Bourke Oval, Taroom | 2 | 1988-89 |
| Wallumbilla-Surat Red Bulls | Wallumbilla & Surat | Wallumbilla Football Ground | 4 | 1997, 2006, 2012,2025 |

=== Former ===
| Club | City | Home ground(s) | No. of A-Grade Premierships | A-Grade Premiership Years |
|---|---|---|---|---|
| Wattles RLFC | Roma | Arthur Beetson Oval | 8 | 1984-87, 1991, 1993–94, 1999 |
| Western Ringers | Charleville & Cunnamulla | Charleville Showgrounds | 0 | None |

== Premiers ==
Grand Final results compiled from scores published in the Rugby League Week.

| Season | Grand Final Information | | | | Minor Premiers |
|---|---|---|---|---|---|
| Season | Premiers | Score | Runners-up | Report | Minor Premiers |
| 1983 | Cities | 61–30 | Wallumbilla |
| 1984 | Wattles | 32–16 | Wallumbilla |
| 1985 | Wattles | 31–12 | Cities |
| 1986 | Wattles | 20–18 | Taroom | | Taroom |
| 1987 | Wattles | 18–2 | Taroom | | Mitchell |
| 1988 | Taroom | 28–22 | Wattles |
| 1989 | Taroom-Wondoan | 18–14 | Wattles |
| 1990 | Cities | 23–12 | Wattles | YT |
| 1991 | Wattles | 48–0 | Taroom |
| 1992 | Cities | 18–16 | Wattles | | Cities |
| 1993 | Wattles | 22–10 | Taroom | | Taroom |
| 1994 | Wattles | 21–10 | Wallumbilla |
| 1995 | Cities | 26–10 | Wattles |
| 1996 | Chinchilla | 32–22 | Wallumbilla |
| 1997 | Wallumbilla | 40–36 | St George |
| 1998 | Chinchilla | 22–20 | St George |
| 1999 | Wattles | 32–20 | St George |
| 2000 | Cities | 28–24 | Chinchilla |
| 2001 | St George | 46–26 | Cities |
| 2002 | Mitchell | 41–35 | St George |
| 2003 | Cities | 38–32 | St George |
| 2004 | Cities | 45–14 | Wallumbilla-Surat | | Wallumbilla-Surat |
| 2005 | St George | 44–28 | Mitchell | | St George |
| 2006 | Wallumbilla-Surat | 32–24 | Mitchell | | St George |
| 2007 | St George | 42–30 | Cities | | Chinchilla |
| 2008 | St George | 68–30 | Chinchilla | | St George |
| 2009 | St George | 36–34 | Wallumbilla-Surat | | St George |
| 2010 | Chinchilla | 46–16 | Wallumbilla-Surat | | Chinchilla |
| 2011 | Chinchilla | 19–18 | St George | | Miles |
| 2012 | Wallumbilla-Surat | 36–30 | Cities | | Wallumbilla-Surat |
| 2013 | Miles | 44–12 | St George | | St George |
| 2014 | Chinchilla | 44–18 | St George | | Chinchilla |
| 2015 | Chinchilla | 24–16 | Cities | MPM | Chinchilla |
| 2016 | Cities | 34–10 | Chinchilla | QRL | Cities |
| 2017 | Cities | 32–14 | Miles | | Cities |
| 2018 | Chinchilla | 28–14 | Wallumbilla-Surat | QRL | Chinchilla |
| 2019 | Cities | 30–10 | Wallumbilla-Surat |
| 2020 | No competition due to COVID-19 pandemic |
| 2021 | Cities | 34–10 | Wallumbilla-Surat | | Cities |
| 2022 | Cities | 38–10 | Mitchell |
| 2023 | Mitchell | 18–12 | Wallumbilla-Surat |
| 2024 | Cities | 34–22 | St George | | Cities |

== External Links and Sources ==
- Rugby League Week at State Library of NSW Research and Collections
- The centenary of the greatest game under the sun : one hundred years of Rugby League in Queensland, Prof. Maxwell Howell, Celebrity Books, 2008.
