= Gladstone District Rugby League =

- Sport: Rugby league
- Instituted: 1918
- Number of teams: 5
- Country: Australia
- Website: www.qrl.com.au Rugby League Gladstone

The Gladstone District Rugby League (GDRL) is a former rugby league competition in Gladstone, Queensland, run by the Queensland Rugby League. The competition, founded in 1918, folded in 2024 after going into recess from 2017 to 2021.

The competition still runs junior grades and fields representative teams.

== History ==
Its most recent season of competition was 2017 for Inter City Women's and 2015 for A-Grade & Under 20s. From 2017 until 2022 Rockhampton Senior Local Rugby League incorporated many of the former GDRL clubs' Women's, First Grade and Under 20s sides, and from 2017 until 2021, Gladstone's Reserve Grade teams.

Gladstone began running its own reserves competition in order to offer senior local competition again from 2022, with other grades continuing to play in Rockhampton. A-Grade returned the following year, however, in 2024 the competition was disbanded in favour of clubs joining the Rockhampton competition again.

== Representative Team ==
Although the league no longer runs a senior competition, it still fields a representative side. The representative team for Gladstone in the 47th Battalion Shield is known as the Gladstone Raiders.

== Rugby League Gladstone Senior Clubs ==
=== 2023 Final Clubs ===
Gladstone District Rugby League (1918–1921; 1923–1941; 1944–1960; 1966–2016; 2022–2023) / Previously known as "Port Curtis Rugby League" (1918–1952)
Club	Established	City / Town	Home ground(s)	Seasons	Fate
Calliope Roosters (Reserves only)	1960	Calliope	Liz Cunningham Park	1960-1961; ^; 1991–1992; 2013–2016; 2022–2023	Joined Northern Districts Rugby League
Past Brothers Gladstone	1930	Gladstone	Briffney Creek Fields	1930–1932; 1968–2015; 2022–2023	Joined Rockhampton District Rugby League
Tannum Sands Seagulls	1994	Boyne Island-Tannum Sands	Dennis Park	1994–2015; 2022–2023	Joined Rockhampton District Rugby League
Valleys Diehards	1919	Gladstone	Valleys Grounds	1919–1941; 1944–1961; 1966–2008; ^; 2010–2015; 2022–2023	Joined Rockhampton District Rugby League
Wallabys	1923	Gladstone	Albion Park	1923–1941; 1944–1951; 1954–1961; 1966–1983; 1993–2008; ^; 2010–2016; 2022–2023	Joined Northern Districts Rugby League

=== Former clubs ===
Former Gladstone District Rugby League Clubs
	Boyne Valley Bluebells	1933	Boyne Valley	"Boyne Valley"	1933; 1935–1936; 1960; ^
?	Calliope-Boyne Valley United	1980	Calliope & Boyne Valley	Liz Cunningham Park "Boyne Valley"	1980–1982; ^
?	Colts	1939	Gladstone	"Gladstone"	1939–1940
?	Country	1929	Gladstone	"Gladstone"	1929
	Dawson Valley	2016	Moura	"Moura"	2016
	Gladstone Rebels	2016	Gladstone	Marley Brown Oval	2016
?	Meatworks	1919	Gladstone	"Gladstone"	1919–1922
	Miriam Vale Magpies	1966	Miriam Vale	Gary Larson Oval	1966–1968
?	Natives	1918	Gladstone	"Gladstone"	1918–1926
	QASC Red Devils ^	1966	Gladstone	Yaralla Sports Club	1966; 1978–1979; ^; 1992
	QASC/CBVU Red Devils ^	1983	GladstoneCalliopeBoyne Valley	Yaralla Sports Club Liz Cunningham Park "Boyne Valley"	1983–1991; ^
?	Railway	1918	Gladstone	"Gladstone"	1918; 1927–1928; 1944–1948; 1951–1952
?	Wallabys-Valleys	2009	Gladstone	Albion Park Valleys Grounds	2009; ^
?	Wanderers	1918	Gladstone	"Gladstone"	1918
?	Waratahs	1937	Gladstone	"Gladstone"	1937–1941
	Wests Seagulls	1949	Gladstone	"Gladstone"	1949–1960; 1969–1983; 1985–1990

== Premiers ==
Gladstone District Rugby League Premierships

A-Grade (Established: 1918)

- 1918: Railways (1)
- 1919: Meatworks (1)
- 1920: Natives (1)
- 1921: Valleys Gladstone Diehards (1)
- 1922: abandoned
- 1923: Wallabys (1)
- 1924: Natives (2)
- 1925: ?
- 1926: ?
- 1927: ?
- 1928: ?
- 1929: Wallabys (?)
- 1930: ?
- 1931: ?
- 1932: ?
- 1933: ?
- 1934: ?
- 1935: ?
- 1936: ?
- 1937: ?
- 1938: Waratahs (1)
- 1939: Colts (1)
- 1940: Wallabys (?)
- 1941: Wallabys (?)
- 1942: Break - WWII
- 1943: Break - WWII
- 1944: Wallabys (?)
- 1945: Wallabys (?)
- 1946: Wallabys (?)
- 1947: Wallabys (?)
- 1948: Wallabys (?)
- 1949: Wallabys (?)
- 1950: ?
- 1951: Wests Seagulls (1)
- 1952: ?
- 1953: ?
- 1954: ?
- 1955: ?
- 1956: ?
- 1957: ?
- 1958: Biloela (1)
- 1959: ?
- 1960: Biloela (2)
- 1961: abandoned
- 1962: abandoned
- 1963: abandoned
- 1964: abandoned
- 1965: abandoned
- 1966: ?
- 1967: Miriam Vale (1)
- 1968: ?
- 1969: ?
- 1970: ?
- 1971: Past Brothers Gladstone (1)
- 1972: ?
- 1973: ?
- 1974: ?
- 1975: ?
- 1976: ?
- 1977: ?
- 1978: ?
- 1979: ?
- 1980: ?
- 1980: QASC Red Devils (1)
- 1981: ?
- 1982: QASC Red Devils (2)
- 1983: Wests Seagulls (6)
- 1984: ?
- 1985: ?
- 1986: ?
- 1987: QASC Red Devils (3)
- 1988: ?
- 1989: Past Brothers Gladstone (8)
- 1990: Past Brothers Gladstone (9)
- 1991: No A-Grade competition^
- 1992: No A-Grade competition^
- 1992: Valleys Gladstone Diehards (14)
- 1993: Valleys Gladstone Diehards (15)
- 1994: Past Brothers Gladstone (10)
- 1995: Tannum Sands (1)
- 1996: Tannum Sands (2)
- 1997: Tannum Sands (3)
- 1998: Tannum Sands (4)
- 1999: Wallabys (25)
- 2000: Valleys Galdstone Diehards (16)
- 2001: Past Brothers Gladstone (11)
- 2002: Wallabys (26)
- 2003: Past Brothers Gladstone (12)
- 2004: Wallabys (27)
- 2005: Wallabys (28)
- 2006: Wallabys (29)
- 2007: Past Brothers Gladstone (13)
- 2008: Tannum Sands (5)
- 2009: Wallabys-Valleys (1)
- 2010: Past Brothers Gladstone (14)
- 2011: Past Brothers Gladstone (15)
- 2012: Wallabys (30)
- 2013: Valleys Gladstone Diehards (?)
- 2014: Past Brothers Gladstone (16)
- 2015: Past Brothers Gladstone (17)
- 2016: No A-Grade competition^
- 2017: Merged into Rockhampton District Rugby League All remaining clubs from 2016 either joined "Rockhampton District Rugby League" or went into recess. From 2022, the reformed Reserve Grade is the top competition run by Gladstone District Rugby League

First Grade Titles by club:

- Past Brothers Gladstone: winners of 13 grand finals between 1971–2007.
- Valleys Gladstone Diehards: winners of 16 grand finals between 1921–2000.
- Wallabys: winners of 29 grand finals between 1923–2006.
- Wests Seagulls: winners of 6 grand finals between 1951–1983.

Reserve Grade (Established: ?)

- Past-1990: ?
- 1991–92: ?^
- 1993–2014: Unknown
- 2015: Unknown
- 2016: Calliope Roosters^
- 2017–21: Merged with Rockhampton District Rugby League^ Gladstone Reserve Grade reformed as the local senior competition in 2022
- 2022: Valleys Gladstone

== Gladstone District Junior Rugby League ==
Gladstone District Junior Rugby League
Gladstone District Junior Rugby League
- Biloela Panthers
- Calliope Roosters
- Gladstone Past Brothers
- Gladstone Valleys Diehards
- Gladstone Wallabys
- Tannum/Boyne Seagulls

== See also ==
- Rockhampton District Rugby League
- Queensland Rugby League Central Division
