= Rockhampton District Rugby League =

- Sport: Rugby league
- Instituted: 1918
- Number of teams: 10
- Country: Australia
- Premiers: Emu Park (2024)
- Most titles: Rockhampton Brothers (13 titles)
- Website: www.qrl.com.au Rockhampton District RL
- Related competition: Gladstone District Rugby League

The Rockhampton District Rugby League (RDRL) is the administrative body for the game of rugby league football in Rockhampton, Queensland. Formed in 1918 and a part of the Queensland Rugby League's Central Division, the RDRL runs senior, junior and women's club competitions and has its headquarters at Browne Park. The competition changed its name to Rockhampton Senior Local Rugby League in 2018.

== Representative Team ==
Rockhampton is represented by the Central Queensland Capras, who compete in the Queensland Rugby League's statewide Queensland Cup competition, and are an affiliate of National Rugby League club Dolphins.

The local leaue's representative team is the Rockhampton Rustlers who participate in QRL Carnivals and events. The team formerly competed in the Winfield State League before the advent of the Capras and the Queensland Cup and won the competition in 1995 over the Gold Coast Vikings 26–22.

== Rockhampton Senior Local Rugby League ==
The local senior competition was established in 1918, and continued with just Rockhampton based clubs until it merged with the Gladstone District Rugby League in 2024.

=== Current clubs ===
Rockhampton Senior Local Rugby League Clubs; Previously known as "Rockhampton District Rugby League"
Club	Moniker	Established	City / Town	Home ground(s)	Premierships
Biloela	Panthers	1954	Biloela	Biloela Oval	None
Brothers Rockhampton	Leprechauns	1918	Rockhampton	Victoria Park	1995-96, 1998-2001, 2006, 2008–10, 2013, 2017–18
Emu Park	Emus	2015	Emu Park	Bicentennial Park	2024
Fitzroy	Sharks	1886	Rockhampton	Saleyards Park/ Cedric Archer Park	2012
Norths	Chargers	1921	Rockhampton	Browne Park	1992-94, 2003–05, 2007, 2015
Past Brothers Gladstone	Leprechauns	1930	Gladstone	Briffney Creek Fields	None
Tannum Sands	Seagulls	1994	Boyne Island-Tannum Sands	Dennis Park	None
Valleys Gladstone	Diehards	1919	Gladstone	Valleys Grounds	None
Wallaby	Wallabies	1923	Gladstone	Albion Park	None
Yeppoon	Seagulls	1968	Yeppoon	Webb Park	1997, 2002, 2011, 2014–15, 2019, 2021–23

=== Former clubs ===
- Railways

=== 2024 Grades ===
Club	A Grade	Reserve Grade	Under 19s	Inter City Women's
Biloela Panthers	No	Yes	Yes	No
Brothers Rockhampton	Yes	Yes	Yes	Yes
Emu Park Emus	Yes	Yes	Yes	Yes
Fitzroy Gracemere Sharks	Yes	Yes	Yes	No
Norths Chargers	Yes	Yes	Yes	Yes
Past Brothers Gladstone	Yes	Yes	Yes	No
Tannum Sands Seagulls	Yes	Yes	Yes	Yes
Valleys Diehards	Yes	Yes	Yes	Yes
Wallabys	No	No	No	Yes
Yeppoon Seagulls	Yes	Yes	Yes	Yes

== Recent Premiers (1992–present) ==
Rockhampton Senior Local Rugby League Premierships

A-Grade (Established: 1918)

- 1992: Norths Chargers
- 1993: Norths Chargers
- 1994: Norths Chargers
- 1995: Brothers Rockhampton
- 1996: Brothers Rockhampton
- 1997: Yeppoon Seagulls
- 1998: Brothers Rockhampton
- 1999: Brothers Rockhampton
- 2000: Brothers Rockhampton
- 2001: Brothers Rockhampton
- 2002: Yeppoon Seagulls
- 2003: Norths Chargers
- 2004: Norths Chargers
- 2005: Norths Chargers
- 2006: Brothers Rockhampton
- 2007: Norths Chargers
- 2008: Brothers Rockhampton
- 2009: Brothers Rockhampton
- 2010: Brothers Rockhampton
- 2011: Yeppoon Seagulls
- 2012: Fitzroy-Gracemere Sharks
- 2013: Brothers Rockhampton
- 2014: Yeppoon Seagulls
- 2015: Yeppoon Seagulls
- 2016: Norths Chargers
- 2017: Brothers Rockhampton
- 2018: Brothers Rockhampton
- 2019: Yeppoon Seagulls
- 2020: No Premier due to COVID-19 Pandemic
- 2021: Yeppoon Seagulls
- 2022: Yeppoon Seagulls
- 2023: Yeppoon Seagulls
- 2024: Emu Park

Womens (Established: 2016)

- 2016: Wallabys Gladstone
- 2017: Emu Park Emus
- 2018: Tannum Sands
- 2019: Rockhampton Brothers
- 2020: No Premier due to COVID-19 Pandemic
- 2021: Rockhampton Brothers
- 2022: Rockhampton Brothers
- 2023: Rockhampton Brothers
- 2024: Emu Park

== Juniors ==
There are two junior competitions in the Rockhampton District, the Rockhampton & District Junior Rugby League and the Callide Dawson Junior Rugby League.

Rockhampton & District Junior Rugby League (2018)
Club	Established	City / Town	Home ground(s)	Boys U18's	Boys U16's	Boys U15's	Boys U14's	Boys U13's	Girls U17's	Girls U14's
Brothers Rockhampton	1918	Rockhampton	Victoria Park	Yes	Yes	Yes	Yes 2	Yes	Yes	Yes
Capricorn Coast Brothers	2007	Pacific Heights	St Benedicts	Yes	Yes ^	Yes	Yes	Yes	No	No
Emu Park Emus	2015	Emu Park	Bicentennial Park	Yes	No	Yes	Yes	Yes	No	No
Fitzroy Sharks	?	Rockhampton	Saleyards Park	No	No	No	No	Yes	No	No
Gladstone Raiders	?	Gladstone	Marley Brown Oval	No	No	No	No	No	Yes	Yes
Gracemere Lions	?	Gracemere	Cedric Archer Park	No	No	Yes	No	Yes	No	No
North Rockhampton Knights	1921	Rockhampton	Jimmy Grounds	Yes 2	Yes	Yes	Yes	Yes	Yes	Yes
Rockhampton Tigers	?	Rockhampton	Elizabeth Park	No	No	Yes	Yes	Yes	Yes ^	Yes ^
Woorabinda Warriors	?	Woorabinda	"Woorabinda"	No	Yes	No	Yes	No	No	No
Yeppoon Seagulls	1968	Yeppoon	Webb Park	Yes	Yes	Yes	Yes	Yes	Yes	Yes

Callide-Dawson Junior Rugby League

Callide-Dawson Junior Rugby League

=== Callide-Dawson Junior Rugby League ===
- Baralaba Panthers
- Duaringa Loggers
- Moura Tigers
- Theodore Roosters
- Woorabinda Warriors

== See also ==
- Gladstone District Rugby League
- Queensland Rugby League Central Division
