= Townsville District Rugby League =

Rugby League Townsville & District Ltd
- Sport: Rugby league
- Instituted: 1920s
- Number of teams: 9
- Country: Australia
- Website: www.qrl.com.au Rugby League Townsville & District

The Rugby League Townsville & District Ltd (RLTD) is a rugby league football competition in Townsville, Queensland, Australia. The competition is run under the Queensland Rugby League, and features nine clubs, who contest a Premiership season across four senior men's and one senior women's grade from April until August.

== Representative Team ==
The local representative team in the Queensland Cup is the Townsville Blackhawks, who play at Jack Manski Oval. Junior squads are nicknamed the Townsville Stingers, which was also the name of the former representative team in the Queensland Cup. RLTD selects representative teams to compete in the yearly Foley Shield and Mal Meninga Cup (Under 19's) state league as the Townsville Stingers/Townsville Blackhawks.

== Senior Clubs ==
The Rugby League Townsville & District Ltd runs an eight club senior competition comprising four grades:

- A-Grade
- Reserve Grade
- Under 20's
- Women

Townsville & District Rugby League
Club	City	Home ground(s)	No. of A-Grade Premierships	A-Grade Premiership Years
Bowen Seagulls *	Bowen	Denison Park		
Townsville Brothers Leprechauns	Townsville	Jack Manski Oval		
Burdekin Roosters	Ayr	Rugby Park		
Centrals ASA Tigers	Townsville	Townsville Sports Reserve		
Charters Towers Miners	Charters Towers	Bill Lewis Oval		
Herbert River Crushers	Ingham	Artie Gofton Oval		
Northern Suburbs Devils	Townsville	Peggy Banfield Park		
Southern Suburbs Bulls	Townsville	Ross River Sports Ground		
Western Suburbs Lions	Townsville	Neil Stewart Park		

- Bowen Seagulls compete only in the Reserve Grade, Under 20's and Women's.

== Recent Grand Finals ==
Townsville & District Rugby League Grand Finals
Year	Premiers	Score	Runners-up	Venue
2013	Herbert River	24 – 12	Townsville Brothers	Townsville Sports Reserve
2014	Townsville Brothers	22 – 8	Burdekin Roosters	Townsville Sports Reserve
2015	Burdekin Roosters	20 – 18	Herbert River	Townsville Sports Reserve
2016	Herbert River	32 – 20	Centrals ASA Tigers	Townsville Sports Reserve
2017	Townsville Brothers	18 – 16	Herbert River	Townsville Sports Reserve
2018	Centrals ASA Tigers	46 – 22	Townsville Brothers	Townsville Sports Reserve
2019	Townsville Brothers	42 – 10	Herbert River	Townsville Sports Reserve
2020	Season Cancelled due to COVID-19			N/A
2021	Townsville Brothers	32 – 0	Centrals ASA Tigers	Townsville Sports Reserve
2022	Herbert River	24 – 14	Townsville Brothers	Townsville Sports Reserve
2023	Townsville Brothers	42-16	Southern Suburbs Bulls	Townsville Sports Reserve
2024	Southern Suburbs Bulls	34-24	Western Suburbs Lions	Townsville Sports Reserve
2025	Southern Suburbs Bulls	22-8	Townsville Brothers	Jack Manski Oval
2026	Southern Suburbs Bulls	23-16	Centrals ASA Tigers	Jack Manski Oval

== Townsville District Juniors ==
The Townsville & District Junior Rugby League (the Kangaroos) runs a ten club juniors competitions with grades ranging from under 6's to under 18's. Townsville's juniors competed in the Cyril Connell Cup state league formerly as the Townsville Stingers, but now go by Mendi Townsville & Districts Blackhawks.

The TDJRL clubs are shown below.

Townsville District JRL clubs
- Abergowrie
- Bowen
- Burdekin
- Centrals A.S.A
- Charters Towers
- Herbert River
- North Thuringowa Devils
- Townsville Brothers
- United Suburbs
- Upper Ross
- Western Lions
- Palm Island Barracudas

== See also ==
- Cairns District Rugby League
- Mackay & District Rugby League
- Queensland Rugby League Northern Division
