= Mackay & District Rugby League =

Mackay District Rugby League
- Sport: Rugby league
- Instituted: 1919
- Number of teams: 8
- Country: Australia
- Website: www.qrl.com.au Rugby League Mackay & District

Mackay & District Rugby League is the governing body for rugby league and the principal competition in Mackay, Queensland, Australia. Founded in 1919, the competition contains eight clubs who compete across three men's grades and one women's grade.

== Representative sides ==
Mackay & District Rugby League selects representative sides for the Queensland Cup and Mal Meninga Cup (Under 18's) state leagues, known as the Mackay Cutters. They were formerly known as the Mackay Sea Eagles during the 1990s.

== Mackay & District Rugby League ==
=== Senior clubs ===
The Mackay & District Rugby League (the Sea Eagles) runs an eight club senior competition of three men's grades, A-Grade, Reserve Grade and Colts (under 18's).

Mackay & District Rugby League
Club	City	Home ground(s)	No. of A-Grade Premierships	A-Grade Premiership Years
Mackay Brothers Leprechauns	Mackay	Leprechaun Park		
Carltons	Mackay	Mackay JRL Grounds		
Magpies RLFC	Mackay	Sologinkin Oval		2023
Moranbah Miners	Moranbah	Darryl Bourke Oval		
Sarina Crocodiles	Sarina	Ray Edwards Oval		2021, 2024
Southern Suburbs Sharks	Mackay	Shark Park		2012, 2013, 2014
Western Suburbs Tigers	Mackay	Tiger Park		2018, 2020, 2022
Whitsundays Brahmans	Proserpine	Les Stagg Oval		2015, 2017, 2019

== Recent Grand Finals ==
Mackay & District Rugby League Grand Finals
Year	Premiers	Score	Runners-up	Venue
2012	Southern Suburbs Sharks			Stadium Mackay
2013	Southern Suburbs Sharks		Moranbah Miners	Stadium Mackay
2014	Southern Suburbs Sharks	36 – 30	Western Suburbs Tigers	Stadium Mackay
2015	Whitsundays Brahmans	21 – 12	Sarina Crocodiles	Stadium Mackay
2016				Stadium Mackay
2017	Whitsundays Brahmans	31 – 6	Western Suburbs Tigers	Stadium Mackay
2018	Western Suburbs Tigers	34 – 16	Moranbah Miners	Stadium Mackay
2019	Whitsundays Brahmans	38 – 4	Western Suburbs Tigers	Stadium Mackay
2020	Western Suburbs Tigers	42 – 18	Brothers Mackay	Stadium Mackay
2021	Sarina Crocodiles	24 – 20	Western Suburbs Tigers	Stadium Mackay
2022	Western Suburbs Tigers	40 – 24	Magpies RLFC	Stadium Mackay
2023	Magpies RLFC	26 – 6	Brothers Mackay	Stadium Mackay
2024	Sarina Crocodiles	16 – 14	Brothers Mackay	Stadium Mackay

== Mackay Juniors ==
The Mackay Junior Rugby League (the Junior Sea Eagles) runs a nine club juniors competitions with grades ranging from under 6's to under 16's. Mackay's juniors competed in the Cyril Connell Cup state league as the Mackay Cutters.

Mackay District JRL
- Brothers Bulldogs JRLFC
- Moranbah Miners JRLFC
- North Mackay Magpies JRLFC
- Northern Suburbs JRLFC
- Proserpine Brahmans JRLFC
- Sarina JRLFC
- Southern Suburbs JRLFC
- Walkerston Wanderers JRLFC
- Western Districts JRLFC

== See also ==
- Cairns District Rugby League
- Townsville District Rugby League
- Queensland Rugby League Northern Division
