= Bundaberg Rugby League =

- Sport: Rugby league
- Instituted: 1913
- Number of teams: 8
- Country: Australia
- Premiers: Waves Tigers (2024)
- Most titles: Past Brothers (15 titles)
- Website: www.qrl.com.au Bundaberg Rugby League

The Bundaberg Rugby League is a rugby league competition in the Wide Bay and Fraser Coast regions of Queensland, Australia. Headquartered in Bundaberg, the competition was founded in 1913, and features six clubs competing across three senior grades.

== Representative Team ==
The local representative team for the league is known as the Bundaberg Grizzlies. The side formerly competed in the Queensland Cup competition, and is based at Salter Oval in the city centre of Bundaberg.

== Current clubs ==
There are currently six clubs in the Bundaberg Rugby League competition. The South Burnett Rugby League enters a combined team into the Under 18s competition.

Bundaberg Rugby League Clubs
| Colours | Club | Formed | Home Ground & City/Town | No. of A-Grade Premierships | A-Grade Premiership Years |
|---|---|---|---|---|---|
| | Eastern Suburbs Magpies | 1913 | Salter Oval, Bundaberg | 3 | 1999, 2001, 2005 |
| | Hervey Bay Seagulls | 1972 | Stafford Park, Hervey Bay | 2 | 2015, 2022 |
| | Maryborough Wallaroos | 1893 | Eskdale Park, Maryborough | 2 | 2003, 2009 |
| | Past Brothers Bundaberg Leprechauns | 1947 | Brothers Sports Ground, Bundaberg | 15 | 1991, 1993, 1994, 1995, 1998, 2000, 2004, 2008, 2010, 2011, 2012, 2017, 2019, 2021, 2023 |
| | Waves Tigers | 1993 | Salter Oval, Bundaberg | 3 | 2007, 2018, 2024 |
| | Western Suburbs Panthers | 1919 | Salter Oval, Bundaberg | 5 | 1989, 1996, 1997, 2006, 2013 |

=== Former clubs ===
- Past Brothers Maryborough Leprechauns (senior club folded 2018)

== Premiers ==
Bundaberg Rugby League Premierships

A-Grade (Established: 1913)

- 1989: Western Suburbs Panthers
- 1990:
- 1991: Past Brothers Bundaberg Leprechauns
- 1992:
- 1993: Past Brothers Bundaberg Leprechauns
- 1994: Past Brothers Bundaberg Leprechauns
- 1995: Past Brothers Bundaberg Leprechauns
- 1996: Western Suburbs Panthers
- 1997: Western Suburbs Panthers
- 1998: Past Brothers Bundaberg Leprechauns
- 1999: Eastern Suburbs Magpies
- 2000: Past Brothers Bundaberg Leprechauns
- 2001: Eastern Suburbs Magpies
- 2002:
- 2003: Maryborough Wallaroos
- 2004: Past Brothers Bundaberg Leprechauns
- 2005: Eastern Suburbs Magpies
- 2006: Western Suburbs Panthers
- 2007: Waves Tigers
- 2008: Past Brothers Bundaberg Leprechauns
- 2009: Maryborough Wallaroos
- 2010: Past Brothers Bundaberg Leprechauns
- 2011: Past Brothers Bundaberg Leprechauns
- 2012: Past Brothers Bundaberg Leprechauns
- 2013: Western Suburbs Panthers
- 2014: Isis Devils
- 2015: Past Brothers Bundaberg Leprechauns
- 2016: Hervey Bay Seagulls
- 2017: Past Brothers Bundaberg Leprechauns
- 2018: Waves Tigers
- 2019: Past Brothers Bundaberg Leprechauns
- 2020: No Premier due to COVID-19 Pandemic
- 2021: Past Brothers Bundaberg Leprechauns
- 2022: Hervey Bay Seagulls
- 2023: Past Brothers Bundaberg Leprechauns
- 2024: Waves Tigers

== Junior League ==
The Bundaberg Rugby League has two junior competitions; the Bundaberg Junior Rugby League and the Fraser Coast Junior Rugby League. Some of the clubs in these leagues field senior sides in the Northern Districts Rugby League competition.

Bundaberg and Fraser Coast Junior Clubs
Bundaberg Junior Rugby League
- Across the Waves Tigers
- Agnes Water Marlins
- Burnett Sea Eagles
- Childers Devils
- Eastern Suburbs Magpies
- Hervey Bay Seagulls
- Past Bundaberg Brothers
- Western Suburbs Panthers

=== Fraser Coast Junior Rugby League ===
- Burrum District Miners
- Hervey Bay Seagulls
- Past Brothers Maryborough
- Rover Saints
- Maryborough Wallaroos

== See also ==
- Queensland Rugby League Central Division
