= Central West Rugby League =

- Sport: Rugby league
- Instituted: 1920s
- Number of teams: 5
- Country: Australia
- Website: www.qrl.com.au Central West Rugby League

The Central West Rugby League is a rugby league football competition in Queensland, Australia. The competition is run by the Queensland Rugby League, and features five teams, who compete for the Wellshot Hotel Senior Men's Premiership. The reigning premiers of the 2023 season are the Blackall Magpies.

== Central West Rugby League Clubs ==
There are five clubs currently competing in the Central West Rugby League competition. The league formerly had six clubs, before the Longreach Tigers and Ilfracombe Scorpions merged in 2017 to form Longreach-Ilfracombe Tigers.

Central West Rugby League
Colours	Club	Established	Town	No. of A-Grade Premierships	A-Grade Premiership Years
	Alpha Brumbies	?	Alpha	?	?
	Barcaldine Sand Goannas	?	Barcaldine	?	1994, 1995, 1996, 1998, 1999, 2000, 2001, 2002, 2004, 2005, 2008, 2009, 2022
	Blackall Magpies	?	Blackall	?	2018, 2019, 2023
	Longreach-Ilfracombe Tigers	?	LongreachIlfracombe	?	1989, 1990, 1993, 1997, 2006, 2007
	Winton Diamantina Devils	?	Winton	?	2003, 2010, 2011, 2013, 2014, 2017
Former Clubs
	Ilfracombe Scorpions	?	Ilfracombe	Merged with Longreach 2017	

== See also ==
- Queensland Rugby League Central Division
