= Toowoomba Rugby League =

Rugby Competition

- Sport: Rugby league
- Instituted: 1919
- Inaugural season: 1919
- Number of teams: 12
- Country: Australia
- Premiers: Gatton Hawks
- Most titles: Valleys Roosters (35 titles)
- Website: TRL at SportsTG

The Toowoomba Rugby League is a competition involving football clubs from the city of Toowoomba and surrounding towns and districts in Queensland, Australia.

Established in 1919, the competition features twelve clubs competing across three men's and on women's grade, and is run under the auspices of Queensland Rugby League Central Division.

== Clubs ==
All the clubs with A-Grade sides also field Reserve Grade sides.

Club	Colours	City	Home ground(s)	No. of A-Grade Premierships	A-Grade Premiership Years
Dalby Devils		Dalby	Dalby Leagues Club, Dalby	1	2017
Gatton Hawks		Gatton	Cahill Park Sporting Complex, Gatton	4	1989, 2013, 2024–2025
Goondiwindi Boars		Goondiwindi	Gilbert Oval, Goondiwindi	2	2005, 2021
Highfields Eagles		Toowoomba	Kuhls Road Oval, Toowoomba	0	None
Newtown Lions		Toowoomba	Jack Martin Centre, Toowoomba	3	1983, 1985, 2002
Oakey Bears		Oakey	Oakey Rugby League Fields	4	1980, 1994, 1998–99
Pittsworth Danes		Pittsworth	Pittsworth Rugby League Oval	2	1986, 2016
Southern Suburbs Tigers		Toowoomba	Gold Park, Toowoomba	1	1996
Brothers Toowoomba Leprechauns		Toowoomba	Glenholme Park, Toowoomba	6	1990-91, 1995, 2000–01, 2012
Toowoomba Valleys Roosters		Toowoomba	John McDonald Sports Complex, Toowoomba	10	1984, 1992, 2006–11, 2018–19
Warwick Cowboys		Warwick	Collegians Junior Rugby League Oval, Warwick	2	1987-88
Wattles Warriors		Toowoomba	Platz Oval, Toowoomba	4	1997, 2014–15, 2022

== Toowoomba Rugby League Grand Final results (1980-present) ==
Grand Final results compiled from scores published in the Rugby League Week.

Season	Grand Final Information				Minor Premiers
Season	Premiers	Score	Runners-up	Report	Minor Premiers
1980	Oakey Bears	28–2	Millmerran Rams
1981	Millmerran Rams	25–7	Valleys Roosters
1982	Millmerran Rams	13–10	Valleys Roosters
1983	Newtown Lions	38–20	Wattles Warriors
1984	Valleys Roosters	19–14	Oakey Bears
1985	Newtown Lions	18–8	Toowoomba All Whites		Newtown Lions
1986	Pittsworth Danes	17–6	Souths Tigers		Pittsworth Danes
1987	Warwick Cowboys	12–10	Pittsworth Danes		Warwick Cowboys
1988	Warwick Cowboys	30–12	Toowoomba All Whites
1989	Gatton Hawks	30–18	Toowoomba All Whites		Millmerran Rams
1990	Toowoomba All Whites	18–10	Souths Tigers
1991	Toowoomba All Whites	24–22	Valleys Roosters		Oakey Bears
1992	Valleys Roosters	26–23	Newtown Lions		Valleys Roosters
1993	Toowoomba All Whites	26–23	Oakey Bears		Wattles Warriors
1994	Oakey Bears	24–18	Toowoomba All Whites
1995	Toowoomba All Whites	36–20	Oakey Bears
1996	Souths Tigers	12–10	Dalby Diehards		Valleys Roosters
1997	Wattles Warriors	42–8	Newtown Lions		Wattles Warriors
1998	Oakey Bears	39–16	Wattles Warriors		Oakey Bears
1999	Oakey Bears	34–16	Warwick Cowboys
2000	Toowoomba All Whites	24–6	Inglewood Roosters		Goondiwindi Boars
2001	Toowoomba All Whites	20–18	Valleys Roosters
2002	Newtown Lions	30–18	Valleys Roosters
2003	Brisbane Broncos Colts	34–26	Valleys Roosters	ABC	Valleys Roosters
2004	Pittsworth Danes	–	Goondiwindi Boars		Goondiwindi Boars
2005	Goondiwindi Boars	36–24	Toowoomba Brothers Leprechauns	STG	Goondiwindi Boars
2006	Valleys Roosters	24–14	Toowoomba Brothers Leprechauns		Valleys Roosters
2007	Valleys Roosters	42–18	Toowoomba Brothers Leprechauns		Valleys Roosters
2008	Valleys Roosters	68–16	Newtown Lions		Valleys Roosters
2009	Valleys Roosters	18–16	Toowoomba Brothers Leprechauns	STG	Valleys Roosters
2010	Valleys Roosters	34–16	Dalby Diehards		Dalby Diehards
2011	Valleys Roosters	37–30	Oakey Bears	TC	Oakey Bears
2012	Toowoomba Brothers Leprechauns	–	Souths Tigers	QT TC	Valleys Roosters
2013	Gatton Hawks	32–20	Valleys Roosters	TC QRL	Souths Tigers
2014	Wattles Warriors	36–12	Gatton Hawks		Wattles Warriors
2015	Wattles Warriors	52–26	Dalby Diehards	TC WDN	Wattles Warriors
2016	Pittsworth Danes	18–12	Warwick Cowboys	QRL TC	Warwick Cowboys
2017	Dalby Diehards	48–4	Pittsworth Danes	TC QRL	Valleys Roosters
2018	Valleys Roosters	24–22	Wattles Warriors	WDN QRL
2019	Valleys Roosters	24–16	Warwick Cowboys	YT
2020	Cancelled due to COVID
2021	Goondiwindi Boars	26–20	Highfields Eagles		Goondiwindi Boars
2022	Wattles Warriors	51–20	Gatton Hawks		Gatton Hawks
2023	Dalby Diehards	20-14	Valleys Roosters		Valleys Roosters
2024	Gatton Hawks	24-20	Valleys Roosters		Gatton Hawks
2025	Gatton Hawks	28-12	Wattles Warriors		Gatton Hawks

== Toowoomba Rugby League Premiers (1920-present) ==
Premiers published in The Chronicle.

Year	Decade
Year	1920s	1930s	1940s	1950s	1960s	1970s	1980s	1990s	2000s	2010s	2020s
0	Roosters	Leprechauns	Carlton	All Whites	All Whites	Warriors	Bears	All Whites	All Whites	Roosters	Cancelled
1	Leprechauns	Roosters	Roosters	Tigers	Tigers	Roosters	Rams	Roosters	All Whites	Roosters
2	Roosters	Roosters	Roosters	Roosters	All Whites	Roosters	Rams	Lions	All Whites	Leprechauns
3	Leprechauns	Lions	All Whites	All Whites	Roosters	Lions	Lions	All Whites	Broncos (C)	Hawks
4	Roosters	Roosters	All Whites	All Whites	Roosters	Danes	Roosters	Bears	Danes	Warriors	TBA
5	Roosters	Leprechauns	All Whites	All Whites	Roosters	Bears	Lions	All Whites	Boars	Warriors	TBA
6	Roosters	Leprechauns	Roosters	All Whites	Roosters	Danes	Danes	Tigers	Roosters	Danes	TBA
7	Roosters	Roosters	Roosters	Tigers	Danes	Bears	Cowboys	Warriors	Roosters	Diehards	TBA
8	Brothers	Roosters	All Whites	Lions	Roosters	Tigers	Cowboys	Bears	Roosters	Roosters	TBA
9	Roosters	Roosters	All Whites	All Whites	Roosters	Bears	Hawks	Bears	Roosters	Roosters	TBA

- (C) = Colts

== Border Rivers Rugby League ==
The Border Rivers Rugby League is a Division 2 competition within the same geographical region, that is also administered by the Toowoomba Rugby League.

=== Clubs ===
Colours	Club	Town	Home ground(s)	No. of A-Grade Premierships	A-Grade Premiership Years
	Eastern Suburbs Hornets	Warwick	East Warwick		
	Inglewood Roosters	Inglewood	MacIntyre Sports Complex		
	MacIntyre Warriors	Boggabilla (NSW)	Boggabilla Sports Ground		
	Stanthorpe Gremlins	Stanthorpe	Sullivan Oval		
	Tenterfield Tigers	Tenterfield (NSW)	Rugby League Park		
	Texas Terriers	Texas	Reg Saunders Oval		

== External links and Sources ==
- Rugby League Week at State Library of NSW Research and Collections
- The centenary of the greatest game under the sun : one hundred years of Rugby League in Queensland, Prof. Maxwell Howell, Celebrity Books, 2008.
