= Group 1 Rugby League =

Rugby league competition in New South Wales, Australia

- Sport: Rugby league
- Ceased: 2005
- Replaced by: Northern Rivers Regional Rugby League
- Country: Australia
- Website: Group 1 Juniors at SportsTG

Group 1 Rugby League was a rugby league competition held in the Northern Rivers region of New South Wales, Australia, run under the auspices of the Country Rugby League. The group, however, still runs a junior rugby league competition. When the Group 18-Gold Coast competition dissolved in 2005, the New South Wales sides joined with Group 1 to form a divisional league, Northern Rivers Regional Rugby League (NRRRL). Group 18 also still holds its own individual junior rugby league competition.

== Seniors ==
The Group 1 Senior Rugby League Premiership amalgamated with Group 18 Rugby League in 2005 to form the Northern Rivers Regional Rugby League, and was thus discontinued in its own right.

== Juniors ==
=== Current teams ===
The following clubs are affiliated with Group 1 juniors, but run senior teams in the NRRRL competition:

- Ballina Seagulls
- Casino RSM
- Clarence Coast Magpies (as Lower Clarence in NRRRL)
- Kyogle Turkeys
- Lismore Marist Brothers Rams

The following clubs are affiliated with Group 1 juniors, but run senior teams in the Group 2 Rugby League competition:

- Grafton Ghosts
- South Grafton Rebels

=== Former teams ===
The following clubs fielded junior teams in Group 1 competitions earlier in the 2010s

- Evans Head Bombers
- Lennox Head Dolphins
- Northern United Dirrawongs
- South Lismore Rabbits
- Upper Clarence

== Notable juniors ==
=== Ballina Seagulls ===
- Frank Curran (1931–1937 South Sydney Rabbitohs)
- James Aubusson (2007–2010 Melbourne Storm & Sydney Roosters)
- Mitchell Aubusson (2007–present Sydney Roosters)
- James Roberts (2011–present South Sydney Rabbitohs, Penrith Panthers, Gold Coast Titans & Brisbane Broncos)
- Tyrone Roberts (2011–present Newcastle Knights, Warrington Wolves & Gold Coast Titans)
- Caleb Binge (2014 Gold Coast Titans)
- Brian Kelly (2017–present Manly Sea Eagles & Gold Coast Titans)
- Nick Meaney (2018–present Newcastle Knights & Canterbury Bulldogs)

=== Casino RSM ===
- Brian Smith
- Tony Smith
- Albert Torrens
- Ben Kennedy
- Cody Walker (rugby league)
- John Elford
- Matt King

=== Clarence Coast Magpies (Lower Clarence Coast Magpies) ===
- Nathan Brown
- Daine Laurie (born 1999)
- Daniel Wagon
- Kevin Plummer
- Luke Douglas
- Tony Priddle

=== Kyogle Turkeys ===
- David Grant – Former Canberra Raiders (1982–85) Balmain Tigers (1978–1981), Eastern Suburbs Roosters (1977) & South Sydney Rabbitohs (1976) player.
- Paul Doolan – Former St George Dragons (1990), Canterbury-Bankstown Bulldogs (1991–93) and Cronulla-Sutherland Sharks (1994–95) player
- Ken Nagas – Former Canberra Raiders (1992–2002) player.
- Nigel Roy – Former Illawarra Steelers (1993–94), North Sydney Bears (1995–99), Northern Eagles (2000) & London Broncos (2001–04) player.
- Jone Macilai – Former Fiji Bati (2008–09) player.
- Shannon Walker – Former Gold Coast Titans (2008–10) & Australia Rugby 7's (2012–17) player.
- Will Mathews – Former Gold Coast Titans (2008–11, 2018–19) & St George Illawarra Dragons (2012–17) player.

=== Lismore Marist Brothers Rams ===
- Andrew King (rugby league)
- Chris King (rugby league)
- David Mead (rugby league)
- Nick Ford-Daley (rugby league)

== First Grade Premierships ==
1964–1983 (Web Archive)

From The Vault on Wayback Machine

1961 Ballina def Casino RSM * Ballina also won the Clayton Cup.

1962 Casino RSM 19–14 Ballina

1963 Casino RSM 8–0 Woodburn

1964 Casino RSM

1965 Casino RSM

1966 Lismore Marist Brothers def Casino RSM

1967 Casino RSM * Casino RSM also won the Clayton Cup.

1968 Casino RSM 32–10 South Lismore

1969 (Two competitions) Ballina 7–3 Casino RSM & 1969 Mallanganee 23–15 Baryulgil

1970 Grafton 12–5 South Grafton

1971 Kyogle+ 14–9 Lower Clarence

1972 South Grafton+ 19-6 Kyogle

1973 Lower Clarence 27–13 Lismore Marist Brothers

1974 Western Suburbs 24–0 South Lismore-Woodburn

1975 South Grafton 17–8 South Lismore-Evans Head

1976 Casino RSM 22–7 South Grafton

1977 Grafton 16–14 South Grafton

1978 South Lismore-Evans Head 18–14 Casino RSM

1979 Casino RSM 33–10 South Grafton

1980 Lismore Marist Brothers 24–8 South Grafton

1981 Lismore Marist Brothers 20–2 Western Suburbs-Alstonville

1982 Ballina 14–4 Casino RSM

1983 Kyogle 14–12 Lower Clarence

=== 1984–Present (Grand Final results compiled from scores published in the rugby league Week.) ===
| Season | Grand Final Information | | | Minor Premiers |
| Season | Premiers | Score | Runners-up | Minor Premiers |
|---|---|---|---|---|
| 1984 | Lower Clarence Mapgies | 25–8 | Grafton Ghosts |
| 1985 | Casino Cougars | 17–10 | Lismore Marist Brothers Rams | Casino Cougars |
| 1986 | Lismore Marist Brothers Rams | 19–14 | South Grafton Rebels | Lismore Marist Brothers Rams |
| 1987 | Lismore Marist Brothers Rams | 22–6 | Kyogle Turkeys | Lismore Marist Brothers Rams |
| 1988 | Grafton Ghosts | 14–8 | Lismore Marist Brothers Rams | Grafton Ghosts |
| 1989 | Ballina Seagulls | 12–10 | Grafton Ghosts | Ballina Seagulls |
| 1990 | Casino Cougars | 38–29 | Kyogle Turkeys | Casino Cougars |
| 1991 | Grafton Ghosts | 29–14 | Ballina Seagulls | Grafton Ghosts |
| 1992 | Lismore Marist Brothers Rams | 6–4 | Ballina Seagulls |
| 1993 | Ballina Seagulls | 12–8 | Lismore Marist Brothers Rams |
| 1994 | Lismore Marist Brothers Rams | 13–6 | South Grafton Rebels | Lismore Marist Brothers Rams |
| 1995 | Byron Bay Red Devils | 17–10 | South Grafton Rebels |
| 1996 | Byron Bay Red Devils | 11–10 | Lismore Marist Brothers Rams |
| 1997 | Lismore Marist Brothers Rams | 20–10 | Ballina Seagulls |
| 1998 | Lismore Marist Brothers Rams | 46–6 | Byron Bay Red Devils |
| 1999 | Lismore Marist Brothers Rams | 29–16 | Casino Cougars |
| 2000 | Lismore Marist Brothers Rams | 34–10 | Byron Bay Red Devils |
| 2001 | Lismore Marist Brothers Rams | 26–2 | Ballina Seagulls |
| 2002 | Grafton Ghosts | 22–20 | Lismore Marist Brothers Rams | Grafton Ghosts |
| 2003 | Lismore Marist Brothers Rams | 42–41 | South Grafton Rebels |
| 2004 | Mullumbimby Giants | 14–12 | Lismore Marist Brothers Rams | Mullumbimby Giants |

== External links and Sources ==
- Rugby League Week at State Library of NSW Research and Collections
