= Country New South Wales rugby league team =

Representative rugby league football team

Country
Team information
- Governing body: Country Rugby League
- Head coach: Craig Fitzgibbon
- Captain: Mitchell Aubusson
- Most caps: 12 – Wally Prigg
- Top try-scorer: 6 – Brian Carlson
- Top point-scorer: 26 – William Conlon

Team results
- First game
- City 29–8 Country (10 June 1911)
- First City vs Country Origin
- City Origin 30–22 Country Origin (1987)
- Biggest win
- Country Origin 42–10 City Origin (2001)
- Biggest defeat
- City 55–2 Country (1980)

The Country New South Wales rugby league team is a representative rugby league football team. Between 1987 and 2017 there were two tiers: the Origin team that consisted of professional players who originated from clubs of the Country Rugby League and a representative team of amateur and semi-professional players. The Country Origin team played annually in the City vs Country Origin competition against the City New South Wales rugby league team, which was made up of players originating from Sydney. This match was discontinued in 2017.

The representative team has played in a number of formats over the years: quad and tri series, annual fixtures and tour matches. The most recent change is the introduction of an Under 23 age limit to the top representative team. The Country Rugby League was absorbed by the New South Wales Rugby League at the end of 2019. The NSWRL continued to run competitions for country regions in February and March 2020 until they were curtailed by lockdown restrictions. This suggests that a NSW Country representative side will be reinstated in the future.

== Men's Open Age Country Team ==
The following players werre selected in the Country squad for the 2022 Open Age Men's match against City at Leichhardt Oval on Sunday, 15 May 2022. The team is coached by Terry Campese.

J#	Position	Player	Club	Region
1	Fullback	Oliver Regan	Ballina Seagulls	Northern Rivers Titans
2	Wing	Dillon Rota	Goulburn City Bulldogs	Monaro Colts
3	Centre, Fullback	Mitchell Andrews	Forbes Magpies	Western Rams
4	Centre	Kayne Brennan	Gerringong Lions	Illawarra South Coast Dragons
5	Wing, Fullback	Donte Efaraimo	Albion Park-Oak Flats Eagles	Illawarra South Coast Dragons
6	Five-eighth	Jake Brisbane	Warilla-Lake South Gorillas	Illawarra South Coast Dragons
7	Halfback	Blair Grant	Warilla-Lake South Gorillas	Illawarra South Coast Dragons
8	Prop	Caleb Ziebell	Cudgen Hornets	Northern Rivers Titans
9	Hooker	James Luff	Gundagai Tigers	Riverina Bulls
10	Prop	Zac Saddler	Tuggeranong Bushrangers	Monaro Colts
11	Second-row	Matthew Delbanco	Stingrays of Shellharbour	Illawarra South Coast Dragons
12	Second-row	Ron Leapai	Goulburn City Bulldogs	Monaro Colts
13	Lock	Keiran Rankmore	Stingrays of Shellharbour	Illawarra South Coast Dragons
14	interchange, Five-eighth	Toby McIntosh	Murwillumbah Mustangs	Northern Rivers Titans
15	interchange, Lock	Darby Medlyn	Tuggeranong Bushrangers	Monaro Colts
16	interchange, Lock	Connor Ziebell	Cudgen Hornets	Northern Rivers Titans.
17	interchange, Prop	Zachary Masters	Tumut Blues	Riverina Bulls
18	interchange	Richard Roberts		North Coast Bulldogs
—	Prop	Bradley Prior	Woden Valley Rams	Monaro Colts

== CRL Team of the Century ==
In 2008, the centenary year of rugby league in Australia, the Country Rugby League named its "Team of the Century":

No.

Position
Player

1 Clive Churchill – FB 2 Brian Carlson – WG 3 Michael Cronin – CE 4 Graeme Langlands – CE 5 Eddie Lumsden – WG 6 Bob Fulton – FE 7 Andrew Johns – HB 8 Steve Roach – PR 9 Ian Walsh – HK

No.

Position
Player

10 Glenn Lazarus – PR 11 Herb Narvo – SR 12 Bradley Clyde – SR 13 Wally Prigg – LK

=== Kit suppliers and sponsors ===
Period	Manufacturers	Sponsors
1999–	Classic Sportswear	Victoria Bitter

== 2017 Country NSW squad ==
Country NSW rugby league team
2017 squad		Coaching staff
1 Michael Gordon – FB; 2 Anthony Don – WG; 3 Mitchell Aubusson (c) – CE; 4 Cheyse Blair – CE; 5 Brian Kelly – WG; 6 Cody Walker – FE; 7 Tyrone Roberts – HB; 8 Dale Finucane – PR; 9 Damien Cook – HK; 10 Paul Vaughan – PR; 11 Tariq Sims – SR; 12 Kyle Turner – SR; 13 Jack De Belin – LK	14 Connor Watson – FE; 15 Matt Prior – PR, SR, LK; 16 Adam Elliott – SR; 17 Daniel Alvaro – PR	Head coach: Craig Fitzgibbon; Legend: (c) Captain(s); (vc) Vice-captain(s)

== Women's City vs Country Match ==
City v Country Women's matches were occasionally played prior to the re-introduction of a stand-alone match in 2017. In 2018 and 2019 the games were played within the National Championships. The 2020 National Championships were cancelled due to the COVID-19 Pandemic in Australia. In 2021 the National Championships were reorganised, and an open age City v Country Women's Origin was scheduled separately from the National Championships.

=== 2022 Squad ===
The following players were selected in the Country Origin Women's team to play on Saturday, 14 May 2022 at 4 Pines Park. The team is coached by Ruan Sims.

J#	Player	2022 State Club	Position(s)	Country						NRLW										2021 State	Interstate	Tests	All Stars
J#	Player	2022 State Club	Position(s)	Dbt	S	M	T	G	Pts	Dbt	S	M	T	G	Pts	2018	2019	2020	2021	2021 State	Interstate	Tests	All Stars
1	Sam Bremner	Cronulla	Fullback	2018	2	4	1	0	4	2018	2	4	1	0	4	1m 1t	—	3m	—	—	—	—	—
2	Teagan Berry	Cronulla	Wing	—	1	1	0	0	0	2020	2	8	5	1	22	—	—	1m 1t 1g	7m 4t	3m 6t	—	—	—
3	Keele Browne	Wests Tigers	Centre	—	1	1	0	0	0	2021	1	3	1	0	4	—	—	—	3m 1t	3m 2t	—	—	—
4	Jayme Fressard	Central Coast	Centre	2020	4	6	1	0	4	2020	2	7	1	0	4	—	—	3m	4m 1t	9m 6t	—	—	—
5	Abbi Church	St Marys	Wing	—	1	1	0	0	0	2021	1	5	2	0	8	—	—	—	5m 2t	8m 3t	—	—	—
6	Bobbi Law	Newcastle Knights	Five-eighth	2019	2	4	3	0	12	2019	3	7	2	0	8	—	1m 1t	1m 1t	5m	—	—	—	2m
7	Jocelyn Kelleher	Central Coast	Halfback	2020	2	2	1	0	4	2020	2	10	1	0	4	—	—	3m	7m 1t	11m 7t 12g	—	—	—
8	Phoebe Desmond	Newcastle Knights	Prop	2021	2	2	0	0	0	2021	1	4	1	0	4	—	—	—	4m 1t	—	—	—	—
9	Olivia Higgins	Newcastle Knights	Hooker	—	1	1	0	0	0	2021	1	7	1	0	4	—	—	—	7m 1t	11m 1t	—	—	—
10	Caitlan Johnston	Newcastle Knights	Prop	2019	2	2	1	0	4	2019	2	4	0	0	0	—	3m	—	1m	10m 5t	—	—	4m
11	Kaitlyn Phillips	Brisbane Broncos	Second-row, Prop	2020	2	4	1	0	4	2020	2	7	1	0	4	—	—	2m	5m 1t	6m 1t	—	—	3m
12	Olivia Kernick	Central Coast	Second-row	—	1	1	0	0	0	2021	1	7	3	0	12	—	—	—	7m 3t	11m 2t	—	—	1m 1m
13	Kirra Dibb	North Sydney	interchange, Lock	2019	2	4	0	7	14	2019	3	11	1	12	28	—	3m 4g	3m 1t 4g	5m 4g	10m 4t 26g	1m 1g	1m	1m 3g
14	Shawden Burton	Central Coast	Hooker	—	1	1	0	0	0	2021	1	2	0	0	0	—	—	—	2m	11m 3t	—	—	—
15	Vanessa Foliaki	St Marys	Prop	2018	3	5	1	0	4	2018	3	11	0	0	0	4m	3m	4m	—	—	6m 1t	6m 4t	1m
16	Tayla Predebon	Newcastle Knights	interchange, Prop	2021	2	2	1	0	4	2021	1	7	0	0	0	—	—	—	7m	11m 7t	—	—	—
17	Melanie Howard	Newcastle Knights	interchange, Halfback	2018	3	6	0	8	16	2018	3	7	2	0	8	3m	2m 1t	2m 1t	—	4m	1m 1g	—	—
—	Rikeya Horne	St Marys	Wing, Centre, Fullback	2018	3	5	2	0	8	2018	4	11	1	0	4	3m 1t	3m	1m	4m	8m 6t	—	—	—

Notes:

- In the above tables J# = Jersey number, Dbt = Debut Year, S = Seasons, M = Matches, T = Tries, G = Goals
- Tallies in the table include the 2022 match.
- Olivia Kernick played for the Indigenous All Stars team in 2021 and for the Māori All Stars team in 2022.

== Matches ==
=== Country Firsts / Combined Country ===
Year	Date	Team name	WLD	Score	Opposition	Location	Game Type	Team List	Report
1911	Jun 10th	Country	L	8-29	Metropolis	Sydney	Opener	SMH	Times
1912	Jun 3rd	Country	L	2-51	Metropolis	Sydney	Main	Referee	Sun
1912	Jun 24th	Country	L	5-23	Metropolis	Sydney	Main	MDM	SMH
1913	Jun 23rd	Country	L	0-18	Metropolis	Sydney	Opener	SMH	SMH
1914	Jun 29th	Country	L	0-25	Metropolis	Sydney	Opener	Times	SMH
1919	Jul 19th	Country	L	5-18	AIF	Sydney	Opener	Sun	Times
1920	Jun 5th	Country	L	7-36	Metropolis	Sydney	Opener	RLN	Referee
1922	Jun 5th	Country	L	26-28	Newcastle	Sydney	Opener	RLN	nSun
1923	Jun 23rd	Combined Country 1st	W	14-8	Newcastle	Sydney	Opener	RLN	Times
1923	Jun 25th	Combined Country-Newcastle	L	12-22	Metropolis	Sydney	Opener	RLN	SMH
1924	May 24	Combined Country	W	10-5	Newcastle	Sydney	Opener	RLN	NMH
1925	Jul 11th	Combined Country	W	10-8	Newcastle	Sydney	Opener	RLN	Sun
1925	Aug 11th	Country	W	13-11	Metropolis	Sydney	Main		SMH
1925	Aug 15th	Country	L	8-28	Metropolis	Sydney	Opener	RLN	SMH
1927	Jun 6th	Combined Country	L	7-66	Combined Metropolis	Sydney	Main	RLN	SMH
1927	Jun 25th	Combined Country	L	10-19	A Metropolitan Thirteen	Sydney	Opener	RLN	EN
1928	May 9	Country	W	35-34	City Firsts	Sydney	Main	SMH	NMH SMH
1928	May 12	Combined Country	W	23-14	Combined City	Sydney	Opener	RLN	Sun
1929	May 27	Country Firsts	L	5-16	City Firsts	Sydney	Main	RLN	
1929	Jun 1st	Combined Country	L	9-13	Combined City	Sydney	Opener	RLN	
1930	May 31	Country Firsts	W	35-26	City Firsts	Sydney	Main	RLN	
1931	May 30	Country Firsts	L	15-17	City Firsts	Sydney	Main	RLN	
1932	Apr 30th	Country Firsts	L	15-27	City Firsts	Sydney	Main	RLN	
1932	May 7	Country Firsts	W	39-23	Metropolis	Sydney	Opener	RLN	
1932	Jul 16th	Country	L	19-25	Sydney	Sydney	Opener	RLN	
1933	May 27	Combined Country Firsts	L	6-47	Combined Sydney Firsts	Sydney	Main	RLN	
1933	Jun 5th	Country	D	17-17	Sydney	Sydney	Opener	RLN	
1934	May 26	Country Firsts	L	14-28	Sydney Firsts	Sydney	Main	RLN	
1934	Sep 15th	Country	L	29-32	Sydney	Sydney	Main	RLN	
1935	May 25	Country Combined Firsts	L	5-20	Sydney Firsts	Sydney	Main	RLN	
1936	May 9	Country Firsts	L	8-41	Sydney Firsts	Sydney	Main	RLN	Sun NMH
1937	May 29	Country Firsts	W	20-12	Sydney Firsts	Sydney	Main	RLN	
1937	Jun 5th	Country	W	15-5	Sydney	Sydney	Opener	RLN	
1938	Jun 4th	Country Firsts	L	12-42	Sydney Firsts	Sydney	Main	RLN	
1939	Jun 3rd	Country Firsts	L	17-38	Sydney Firsts	Sydney	Main	RLN	
1940	Jun 8th	Far Northern	L	5-30	Combined Team	Sydney	Opener	RLN	
1940	Aug 10th	Country	L	10-28	Sydney	Sydney	Main	RLN	Sun Sun
1941	Jun 7th	Country Firsts	L	21-44	City Firsts	Sydney	Main	RLN	
1942	Jul 4th	Country Firsts	W	14-11	City Firsts	Sydney	Main	RLN	
1943	Jun 12th	Country Firsts	L	25-37	City Firsts	Sydney	Main	RLN	
1944	Jun 12th	Country Firsts	L	10-17	City Firsts	Sydney	Main	RLN	
1945	Jun 9th	Country	L	12-41	Sydney	Sydney	Main	RLN	
1946	May 4	Country Firsts	L	10-31	Sydney Firsts	Sydney	Main	RLN	
1947	Jun 7th	Country Firsts	L	10-33	Sydney Firsts	Sydney	Main	RLN	
1948	May 8	Country Firsts	L	13-28	Sydney Firsts	Sydney	Main	RLN	Sun DT
1948	May 26	Combined Country	L	16-30	New Zealand	Wollongong	Main	RLN	IM
1948	May 29	Country Firsts	L	5-6	City Firsts	Wollongong		RLN	IM
1949	Jun 4th	Country Firsts	L	2-23	Sydney Firsts	Sydney	Main	RLN	Sun Sun
1949	Jun 19th	Combined Country	W	18-6	Queensland	Wollongong	Tour		SMH SCT
1950	May 13	Country Firsts	L	13-51	Sydney Firsts	Sydney	Main	RLN	Sun
1951	May 12	Country Firsts	L	6-24	Sydney Firsts	Sydney	Main	RLN	Sun DT
1952	May 17	Country Firsts	L	21-23	Sydney Firsts	Sydney	Main	RLN	DT
1952	Jun 1st	Country Firsts	L	18-27	Sydney	Sydney	Rep Weekend	RLN	IM DT
1953	May 16	Country Firsts	W	28-27	Sydney Firsts	Sydney	Main	RLN	Sun CT
1953	Jun 7th	Country Firsts	W	35-9	American All Stars	Wollongong	Tour		IM DT
1954	May 8	Country Firsts	L	9-50	Sydney Firsts	Sydney	Main	RLN	DT SH
1955	May 14	Country Firsts	L	18-31	Sydney Firsts	Sydney	Main	RLN	
1956	May 19	Country Firsts	L	17-32	Sydney Firsts	Sydney	Main	RLN	
1956	Aug 26th	Country	L	22-34	Sydney	Sydney	Trial	RLN	CT
1957	May 18	Country Firsts	L	2-53	Sydney Firsts	Sydney	Main	RLN	
1958	May 17	Country Firsts	L	14-55	Sydney Firsts	Sydney	Main	RLN	CT
1959	May 23	Country Firsts	L	7-37	Sydney Firsts	Sydney	Main	RLN	
1959	Aug 16th	Country	L	18-19	Sydney	Sydney	Trial	RLN	CT
1960	May 14	Country Firsts	L	2-20	Sydney Firsts	Sydney	Main	RLN	CT
1960	Aug 28th	Country	L	18-27	Metropolis	Sydney	Trial	RLN	CT
1961	Jun 3rd	Country Firsts	W	19-5	Sydney Firsts	Sydney	Main	RLN	
1962	May 12	Country Firsts	W	18-8	Sydney Firsts	Sydney	Main	RLN	CT
1963	May 11	Country Firsts	L	11-35	Sydney Firsts	Sydney	Main	RLN	
1963	Aug 25th	Country	L	10-15	Sydney	Sydney	Trial	RLN	
1964	May 16	Country Firsts	L	4-27	Sydney Firsts	Sydney	Main	RLN	
1965		NSW Country	L	5-18	Auckland	Auckland	On Tour		CT
1965	May 22	Country Firsts	L	2-32	Sydney Firsts	Sydney	Main	RLN	CT
1966	May 29	NSW Country	L	-	Auckland	NZ	On Tour	CT	
1966	Jun 4th	Country Firsts	L	14-18	Sydney Firsts	Sydney	Main	RLN	CT
1967	May 6	Country Firsts	L	17-18	Sydney Firsts	Sydney	Main	RLN	CT
1967	Sep 3rd	Country	W	16-12	Sydney	Sydney	Trial	RLN	CT
1968	May 1	Combined Country	L	10-12	South Island	Christchurch	On Tour		CT
1968	May 4	Combined Country	L	5-13	North Island	Auckland	On Tour		
1968	May 5	Combined Country	L	12-18	New Zealand Maori	Auckland	On Tour		
1968	May 11	Country Firsts	L	14-34	Sydney Firsts	Sydney	Main	RLN	CT
1969	May 10	Country Firsts	L	20-27	Sydney Firsts	Sydney	Main	RLN	CT
1970	May 16	Country Firsts	L	18-22	Sydney Firsts	Sydney	Main	RLN	CT
1970	Sep 13th	Country	L	20-26	Sydney	Sydney	Trial	RLN	CT
1971	May 2	Combined Country	W	13-2	North Queensland	Townsville	On Tour		CT
1971	May 5	Combined Country	W	25-6	Central Queensland	Rockhampton	On Tour		
1971	May 8	Combined Country	W	11-9	Brisbane	Brisbane	On Tour		
1971	May 22	Country Firsts	L	0-17	Sydney Firsts	Sydney	Main	RLN	
1971	Aug 7th	Combined Country	L	18-19	Queensland	Newcastle	Tour	CT	
1972	May 7	Combined Country	W	26-9	North Queensland	Townsville	On Tour		
1972	May 10	Combined Country	W	24-0	Central Queensland	Rockhampton	On Tour		
1972	May 13	Combined Country	W	20-14	Southern Queensland	Brisbane	On Tour		
1972	May 20	Country Firsts	L	8-35	Sydney Firsts	Sydney	Main	RLN	
1972	Jul 4th	Combined Country	W	26-10	New Zealand	Queanbeyan	Tour	CT	CT
1973	May 6	Combined Country	W	24-16	North Queensland	Mackay	On Tour	CT	
1973	May 9	Combined Country	W	14-11	Southern Queensland	Brisbane	On Tour		CT
1973	May 13	Combined Country	W	34-24	South Queensland Country	Toowoomba	On Tour		CT
1973	May 19	Country Firsts	L	17-33	Sydney Firsts	Sydney	Main	RLN	CT
1974	May 5	Combined Country	W	34-11	South Island	Christchurch	On Tour		CT
1974	May 8	Combined Country	W	16-5	Wellington	Wellington	On Tour		
1974	May 11	Combined Country	W	21-6	Auckland	Auckland	On Tour	CT	CT
1974	May 18	Country Firsts	L	0-23	City Firsts	Sydney	Main	CT	CT
1975	May 4	Combined Country	W	31-8	North Queensland	Townsville	On Tour		
1975	May 7	Combined Country	W	39-5	Central Queensland	Rockhampton	On Tour		CT
1975	May 11	Combined Country	W	27-14	Southern Queensland	Brisbane	On Tour	CT	CT
1975	May 17	Country Firsts	W	19-9	Sydney Firsts	Sydney	Main	CT	YT CT
1975	May 24	Combined Country	L	26-33	New Zealand	Newcastle	Tour	CT	
1976	May 2	Combined Country	W	56-9	Central Queensland	Rockhampton	On Tour	CT	CT
1976	May 5	Combined Country	W	25-10	Toowoomba	Toowoomba	On Tour	CT	CT
1976	May 9	Combined Country	L	11-18	Southern Queensland	Brisbane	On Tour		CT
1976	May 15	Country Firsts	L	0-47	City Firsts	Sydney	Main	CT	CT
1977	May 1	Combined Country	W	31-18	Wide Bay	Wondai	On Tour	CT	CT
1977	May 4	Combined Country	W	22-13	Central Queensland	Rockhampton	On Tour		CT
1977	May 8	Combined Country	W	22-18	Southern Queensland	Brisbane	On Tour		
1977	May 14	Country Firsts	L	0-36	City Firsts	Sydney	Main	CT	CT
1978	May 9	Combined Country	W	33-13	Southern North Coast	Wauchope	On Tour		
1978	May 11	Combined Country	W	34-8	Far North Coast	Tweed Heads	On Tour		
1978	May 13	Combined Country	W	23-7	Ipswich	Ipswich	On Tour		
1978	May 14	Combined Country	W	28-21	Southern Queensland	Brisbane	On Tour		
1978	May 16	Combined Country	W	26-17	Northern	West Tamworth	On Tour		
1978	May 20	Country Firsts	L	13-30	City Firsts	Sydney	Main	CT	
1979	May 9	Combined Country	W	20-15	Monaro	Queanbeyan	Split Tour		CT
1979	May 9	Combined Country	W	13-5	Group 12 (Central Coast)	Gosford	Split Tour		
1979	May 12	Combined Country	W	28-5	Riverina	Wagga	Split Tour		CT
1979	May 13	Combined Country	L	23-32	Western Division	Dubbo	Split Tour		
1979	May 19	Country Firsts	L	0-29	City Firsts	Sydney	Main	CT	CT
1979	May 23	NSW Country	L	10-25	South Sydney	Sydney	Midweek Cup		CT
1979	Jun 6th	NSW Country	W	14-11	Western Suburbs	Sydney	Midweek Cup		
1979	Jul 11th	NSW Country	L	11-25	Balmain	Lismore	Midweek Cup		CT
1980	May 7	Combined Country	W	17-3	Far North Coast	Tweed Heads	On Tour		
1980	May 9	Combined Country	L	16-18	Riverina	Wagga	On Tour		
1980	May 11	Combined Country	W	35-5	Monaro	Queanbeyan	On Tour	CT	CT
1980	May 17	Country Firsts	L	2-55	City Firsts	Sydney	Main	CT	CT
1980	May 21	NSW Country	L	3-35	Canterbury	Sydney	Midweek Cup		CT
1980	Jul 2nd	NSW Country	L	9-18	Penrith	Queanbeyan	Midweek Cup		CT
1981	Apr 30th	NSW Country	W	20-7	Central Coast	Gosford	On Tour		
1981	May 2	NSW Country	D	5-5	Far North Coast	Lismore	On Tour		
1981	May 6	NSW Country	W	12-5	Monaro	Queanbeyan	On Tour		CT
1981	May 10	NSW Country	W	25-20	Western	Dubbo	On Tour		
1981	May 16	Country Firsts	L	7-38	City Firsts	Canberra	Main	CT	CT
1981	May 27	NSW Country	L	14-23	Western Suburbs	Sydney	Midweek Cup		
1981	Jun 17th	NSW Country	L	9-13	North Sydney	Sydney	Midweek Cup		CT
1982	May 8	NSW Country	W	21-19	Newcastle	Newcastle	On Tour		
1982	May 12	NSW Country	W	28-9	Northern Rivers	Tweed Heads	On Tour		
1982	May 16	NSW Country	L	10-21	Riverina	Wagga	On Tour		
1982	May 22	Country Firsts	L	3-47	City Firsts	Newcastle	Main	CT	CT
1982	May 26	NSW Country	L	2-15	Cronulla	Sydney	Midweek Cup		CT
1982	Jun 16th	NSW Country	L	3-41	Parramatta	Sydney	Midweek Cup		CT CT
1983	May 15	Combined Country	W	52-12	South Island	Christchurch	On Tour		CT
1983	May 21	Country Firsts	L	14-30	City Firsts	Newcastle	Partly Origin	CT	CT
1983	May 25	NSW Country	W	20-12	South Sydney	Sydney	Midweek Cup		CT
1983	Jul 20th	NSW Country	L	14-54	Brisbane Firsts	Sydney	Midweek Cup		YT CT
1984	May 9	NSW Country	W	17-4	Western Suburbs	Bathurst	Midweek Cup		
1984	May 19	Country Firsts	L	12-38	City Firsts	Sydney	Partly Origin	CT	CT
1984	Jul 4th	NSW Country	L	4-24	Eastern Suburbs	Sydney	Midweek Cup		CT
1985	Apr 10th	NSW Country	L	4-24	Cronulla	Tamworth	Midweek Cup		CT
1985	May 18	Country Firsts	L	12-18	City Firsts	Newcastle	Partly Origin	CT	CT
1986	Apr 23rd	NSW Country	L	4-36	St George	Bathurst	Midweek Cup		CT
1986	May 17	Country Firsts	L	18-34	City Firsts	Newcastle	Partly Origin	CT	CT
1987	Apr 29th	NSW Country	L	0-54	Eastern Suburbs	Sydney	Midweek Cup		CT
1987	May 6	NSW Country	W	18-0	Waikato League	Huntly	On Tour		
1987	May 10	NSW Country	L	8-44	Auckland	Auckland	On Tour		CT
1987	May 16	Country Firsts	L	12-52	Sydney Firsts	Parramatta	Opener	CT	CT
1988	Feb 20th	Country Firsts	W	28-18	Balmain	Bathurst	Trial		CT
1988	Mar 22nd	NSW Country	W	25-0	Port Moresby Vipers	Goroka	Midweek Cup		
1988	Mar 25th	NSW Country	L	0-8	Combined Brisbane	Brisbane	Midweek Cup		CT
1988	May 11	Country Firsts	L	16-54	Sydney Firsts	Sydney	Opener	CT	CT
1988	Jul 24th	NSW Country	W	28-10	Papua New Guinea	Bathurst	Tour		CT
1989	Feb 25th	Country Firsts	L	14-36	Canberra Raiders	Queanbeyan	Trial	CT	CT
1989	Apr 7th	NSW Country	L	2-9	Combined Brisbane	Tweed Heads	Midweek Cup		
1989	May 13	Country Firsts	L	10-18	Sydney Firsts	Broadmeadow	Opener		CT
1990	Apr 25th	Country Firsts	L	26-38	Sydney Firsts	Sydney	Opener	CT	CT
1990	May 16	NSW Country	W	23-18	Brisbane	Moree	Quad Series		
1990	May 19	NSW Country	W	17-4	Queensland Country	Brisbane	Quad Series		
1990	May 22	NSW Country	W	54-10	Port Moresby	Tweed Heads	Quad Series		
1991	Apr 25th	Country Firsts	L	20-36	City Firsts	Sydney	Opener	CT	CT
1991	Jun 2nd	NSW Country	W	36-28	Western Australia	Perth	On Tour		
1992	Apr 24th	Country Firsts	L	8-28	City Firsts	Sydney	Opener	CT	
1992	Jun 16th	NSW Country	L	6-24	Great Britain	Parkes	Tour	CT	YT CT
1992	Jul 3rd	NSW Country	L	8-28	Queensland Country	Brisbane	Main	CT	
1993	Apr 23rd	Country Firsts	L	4-40	City Firsts	Parramatta	Opener	CT	
1994	May 6	Country Firsts	W	25-22	Metropolitan Cup	Broadmeadow	Opener		CT
1995	May 5	Country Firsts	W	16-8	Metropolitan Cup	Wollongong	Opener		
1996	May 3	Country Firsts	D	10-10	Metropolitan Cup	Wollongong	Opener		
1998	May 22	Country Firsts	L	18-28	Presidents Cup	Sydney	Opener		
1999	Apr 23rd	Country Firsts	D	18-18	NSWRL First Division	Olympic Park	Opener		
2000	Apr 21st	Country Firsts	L	0-38	NSWRL First Division	Olympic Park	Opener		
2001	Jun 8th	Country Firsts	L	22-32	NSWRL First Division	Bathurst	Opener		
2002	Jun 15th	Country Firsts	W	54-16	Queensland Country	Narrabri	Quad Series		
2002		NSW Country	L	10-28	UTS Perpignan	France	On Tour		
2002		NSW Country	W	30-22	St Gaudens	France	On Tour		
2002		NSW Country	W	46-16	Toulouse	France	On Tour		
2004	Jun 26th	NSW Country	L	22-50	Queensland Rangers	Murwillumbah	On Tour		RLW
2004	Jul 7th	NSW Country	W	24-14	Auckland	Auckland	On Tour		
2004	Jul 7th	NSW Country	L	18-36	New Zealand A	Auckland	On Tour		
2005	Jun 26th	NSW Country	W	28-24	Queensland Rangers	Blackwater	Tri Series		
2005	Oct 1st	NSW Country	W	34-4	New Zealand Residents	Wollongong	Tri Series		
2006	Jun 21st	NSW Country	W	28-10	Jim Beam Cup	NZ	Quad Series	RLW	
2006	Jun 24th	NSW Country	W	34-32	Queensland Rangers	NZ	Quad Series		RLW
2006	Jun 27th	NSW Country	W	22-8	New Zealand Residents	NZ	Quad Series		
2006	Jul 1st	NSW Country	L	18-32	New Zealand Residents	NZ	Quad Series		
2007	Jul 10th	NSW Country	W	32-14	Affiliated States	Narrabri	Quad Series		
2007	Jul 11th	NSW Country	W	40-22	Queensland Rangers	Tamworth	Quad Series		
2007	Jul 14th	NSW Country	L	16-29	Jim Beam Cup	Narrabri	Quad Series		
2007	Jul 21st	NSW Country	W	26-16	Jim Beam Cup	Tamworth	Quad Series		RLW
2008	July	NSW Country	L	14-28	Jim Beam Cup		Quad Series		
2008	July	NSW Country	W	28-26	Queensland Rangers		Quad Series		
2008	July	NSW Country	W	64-8	GB Community Lions		Quad Series		
2008	July	NSW Country	L	8-28	Jim Beam Cup	Kawana	Quad Series		RLW
2009	Jul 11th	NSW Country	W	28-24	Queensland Rangers	Forster	Annual		RLW
2010	Jul 10th	NSW Country	L	16-19	Queensland Rangers	Bundaberg	Annual	RLW	
2010	Oct 16th	NSW Country	L	22-26	Cook Islands	Tamworth	Warm-Up		
2011	Jul 9th	NSW Country	W	34-24	Queensland Rangers	Coonabarabran	Annual		
2013	Oct 12th	NSW Country	W	50-0	Combined Clubs	South Arica	On Tour		
2013	Oct 18th	NSW Country	W	58-18	South African Rhinos	Brakpen	On Tour		NH
2014	July	NSW Country Bulls	L	22-34	Queensland Rangers	Rockhampton	Annual		
2014	July	NSW Country	W	-	Hawaiian Chiefs	Hawaii	On Tour		
2014	July	NSW Country	W	52-12	Hawaiian Chiefs	Hawaii	On Tour		
2015		NSW Country Firsts		-	Fiji	Fiji	On Tour	APRL	
2016	Jul 16th	NSW Country Bulls	L	12-22	Western Australia	Perth	On Tour	NDL	FA
2017	October	NSW Country U23	L	26-40	Samoa	Wagga	Warm-Up		YT
2017	October	NSW Country U23	W	50-14	Scotland	Ballina	Warm-Up		YT
2018	October	NSW Country U23	W	44-10	Australian Defence Force	Ipswich	On Tour		YT
2018	October	NSW Country U23	L	12-18	Papua New Guinea U23	Port Moresby	On Tour		YT
2019	Oct 8th	NSW Country U23	W	74-6	North Island Champions	Rotorua	On Tour		YT
2019	Oct 12th	NSW Country U23	L	16-17	Canterbury Bulls	Christchurch	On Tour		YT
2021	May 16th	Country	L	12-38	City	Collegians Sporting Complex	Residential	NSWRL	NSWRL
2022	May 15th	Country	W	36-34	City	Leichhardt Oval	Residential	NSWRL	NSWRL

=== Origin ===
Year	Date	Team name	WLD	Score	Opposition	Location	Game Type	Team List	Report
1987	May 16	Country Origin	L	22-30	City Origin	Sydney	Origin	CT	CT
1988	May 11	Country Origin	L	18-20	City Origin	Sydney	Origin	CT	CT
1989	May 13	Country Origin	L	8-16	City Origin	Newcastle	Origin	CT	CT
1990	Apr 25th	Country Origin	L	26-28	City Origin	Sydney	Origin	CT	CT
1991	Apr 25th	Country Origin	L	12-22	City Origin	Sydney	Origin	CT	CT
1992	Apr 24th	Country Origin	W	17-10	City Origin	Sydney	Origin	CT	YT CT
1993	Apr 23rd	Country Origin	L	0-7	City Origin	Sydney	Origin	CT	CT
1994	May 6	Country Origin	W	22-2	City Origin	Newcastle	Origin	CT	CT
1995	May 5	Country Origin	L	8-16	City Origin	Wollongong	Origin	CT	CT
1996	May 3	Country Origin	W	18-16	City Origin	Wollongong	Origin		YT
1997	Apr 25th	Country Origin	W	17-4	City Origin	Newcastle	Origin		YT
2001	Jun 8th	Country Origin	W	42-10	City Origin	Bathurst	Origin		
2002	May 10	Country Origin	L	16-26	City Origin	Wagga Wagga	Origin		
2003	May 16	Country Origin	L	16-17	City Origin	Gosford	Origin		
2004	May 7	Country Origin	W	22-18	City Origin	Gosford	Origin		
2005	May 6	Country Origin	L	22-29	City Origin	Lismore	Origin		
2006	May 12	Country Origin	W	12-10	City Origin	Dubbo	Origin		
2007	May 3	Country Origin	L	6-12	City Origin	Coffs Harbour	Origin		
2008	May 2	Country Origin	D	22-22	City Origin	Wollongong	Origin		
2009	May 8	Country Origin	L	18-40	City Origin	Orange	Origin		
2010	May 7	Country Origin	W	36-18	City Origin	Port Macquarie	Origin		YT
2011	May 6th	Country Origin	W	18-12	City Origin	Albury	Origin		
2012	Apr 22nd	Country Origin	L	22-24	City Origin	Mudgee	Origin		YT
2013	Apr 21st	Country Origin	W	18-12	City Origin	Coffs Harbour	Origin		
2014	May 4th	Country Origin	D	26-26	City Origin	Dubbo	Origin		
2015	May 3rd	Country Origin	W	34-22	City Origin	Wagga Wagga	Origin		YT
2016	May 8th	Country Origin	L	30-44	City Origin	Tamworth	Origin		
2017	May 7th	Country Origin	L	10-20	City Origin	Mudgee	Origin		

=== Women's ===
Year	Date	Team name	WLD	Score	Opposition	Location	Game Type	Team List	Report
2017	May 14	Country Origin	L	8-20	City Origin	North Sydney	Origin	NRL	
2018	Jun 1st	NSW Country	W	34-10	Australian Defence Force	Southport	Nationals	NRL	QRL
2018	Jun 2nd	NSW Country	W	16-6	Queensland City	Southport	Nationals		QRL
2018	Jun 3rd	NSW Country	W	16-12	NSW City	Southport	Nationals		QRL
2019	May 30th	NSW Country	W	54-0	Australian Defence Force	Burleigh	Nationals	NRL	QRL
2019	Jun 1st	NSW Country	W	20-14	Queensland Country	Burleigh	Nationals		NRL
2019	Jun 2nd	NSW Country	L	4-34	NSW City	Burleigh	Nationals		NRL
2021	May 15	Country Origin	L	16-40	City Origin	Bankwest Stadium	Origin	NSWRL	NRL
2022	May 14th	Country Origin	W	14-6	City Origin	4 Pines Park	Origin	NSWRL	NSWRL

== Country Origin Player of the Year ==
Year	Player	Club
1992	Laurie Daley	Canberra Raiders
1993	Paul Harragon	Newcastle Knights
1994	John Simon	Illawarra Steelers
1995	Paul Harragon	Newcastle Knights
1996	Paul Harragon	Newcastle Knights
1997	Paul McGregor	Illawarra Steelers
2001	Danny Buderus	Newcastle Knights
2002	Steve Simpson	Newcastle Knights
2003	Glenn Morrison	North Queensland Cowboys
2004	Scott Hill	Melbourne Storm
2005	Trent Barrett	St. George Illawarra Dragons
2006	Brent Kite	Manly Warringah Sea Eagles
2007	Craig Fitzgibbon	Sydney Roosters
2008	Anthony Laffranchi	Gold Coast Titans
2009	Ben Creagh	St. George Illawarra Dragons
2010	Josh Dugan	Canberra Raiders
2011	Glenn Stewart	Manly Warringah Sea Eagles
2012	Greg Bird	Gold Coast Titans
2013	Aiden Tolman	Canterbury-Bankstown Bulldogs
2014	Jamal Idris	Penrith Panthers
2015	Ryan Hinchcliffe	Melbourne Storm
2016	James Maloney	Cronulla-Sutherland Sharks
2017	Dale Finucane	Melbourne Storm

== See also ==
- List of Country Origin team players
- Sydney rugby league team
- Newcastle rugby league team
- Brisbane rugby league team

== Sources ==
Years	Acronym	Item	Available Online	Via
1911 to 2017	RLP	Rugby League Project	Yes	RLP website
1920 to 1973	RLN	Rugby League News	Yes	Trove
1911 to 1954	SMH	The Sydney Morning Herald	Yes	Trove
1911 to 1954	Sun	The Sun	Yes	Trove
1911 to 1954	DT	Daily Telegraph	Yes	Trove
1911 to 1954	NMH	Newcastle Morning Herald	Yes	Trove
1911 to 1954	IM	Illawarra Mercury	Yes	Trove
1955 to 1991	CT	Canberra Times	Yes	Trove
1911 to 1954		Various other Newspapers	Yes	Trove
1967–69, 1971–96	-	Country Rugby League Annual Report	No	State Library of NSW
1935, 41–44, 48, 53, 58, 72–76, 78, 80–81, 1991-96, 1998–2009	-	New South Wales Rugby League Annual Report	No	State Library of NSW
2014–19	-	New South Wales Rugby League Annual Report	Yes	NSWRL website
2003 to 2014	RLW	Rugby League Week	Yes	eResources at State Library of NSW
1974 to 2016	BL	Big League	No	State Library of NSW
2010 to 2019	-	Various Newspaper Websites	Yes	As referenced
