= Brent Kite =

Australia & Tonga international rugby league footballer

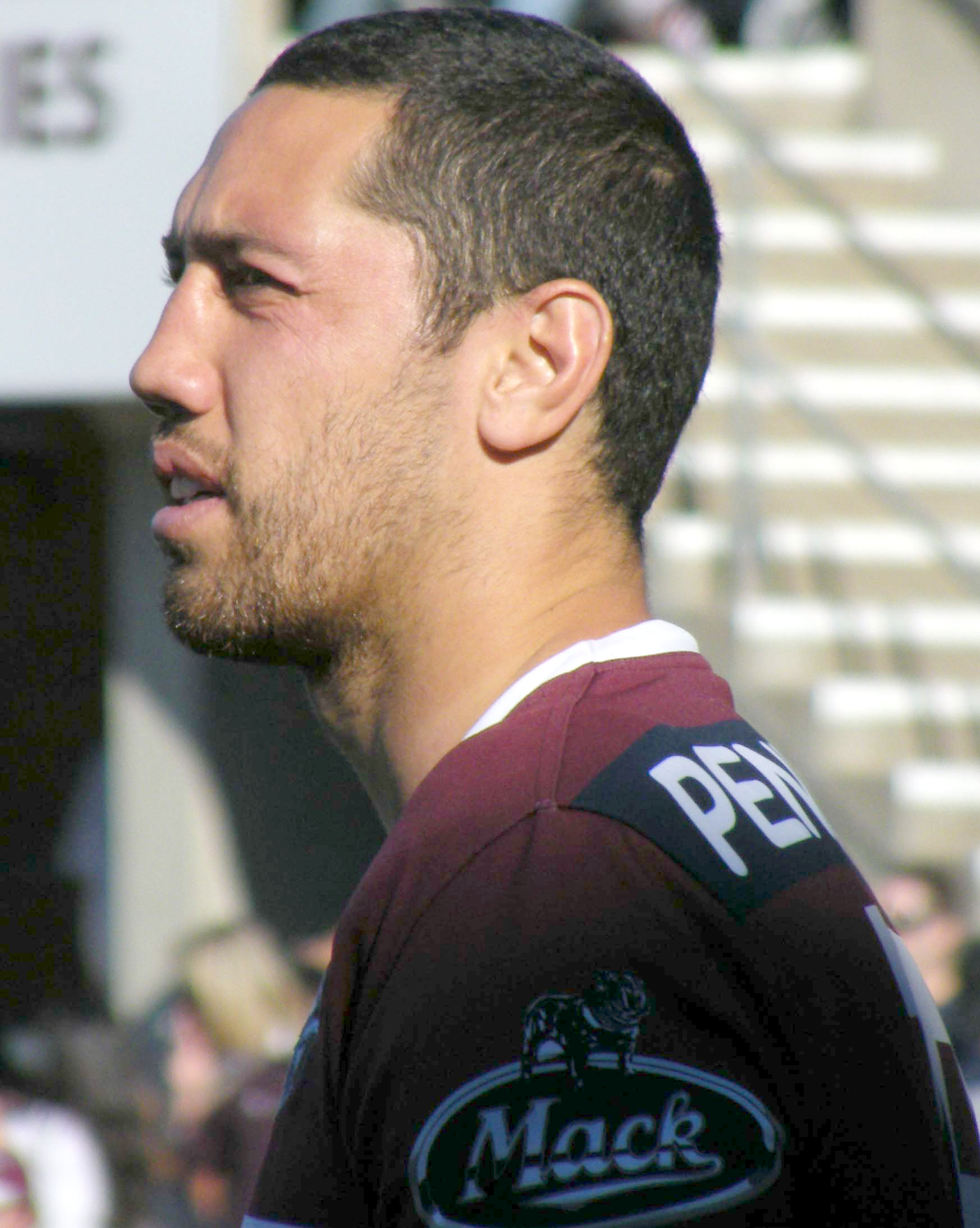

Personal information
- Born: 7 March 1981 (age 45) Queanbeyan, New South Wales, Australia

Playing information
- Height: 190 cm (6 ft 3 in)
- Weight: 105 kg (16 st 7 lb)
- Position: Prop, Second-row
Club
| Years | Team | Pld | T | G | FG | P |
|---|---|---|---|---|---|---|
| 2002–04 | St. George Illawarra | 67 | 9 | 0 | 0 | 36 |
| 2005–13 | Manly Sea Eagles | 221 | 12 | 0 | 0 | 48 |
| 2014–15 | Penrith Panthers | 25 | 0 | 0 | 0 | 0 |
| | Total | 313 | 21 | 0 | 0 | 84 |
Representative
| Years | Team | Pld | T | G | FG | P |
| 2000–13 | Tonga | 6 | 0 | 0 | 0 | 0 |
| 2004–06 | NSW Country | 2 | 0 | 0 | 0 | 0 |
| 2004–09 | New South Wales | 10 | 0 | 0 | 0 | 0 |
| 2006–09 | Australia | 14 | 0 | 0 | 0 | 0 |

Brent Kite (born 7 March 1981) is a former professional rugby league footballer who played in the 1990s, 2000s and 2010s. A Tonga and Australia international, and New South Wales State of Origin representative front-row forward, he played club football for the St. George Illawarra Dragons, Manly Warringah Sea Eagles and Penrith Panthers. Kite was named the Clive Churchill Medallist for his performance in the 2008 NRL Grand Final, in which he helped steer Manly-Warringah to a 40–0 thumping of the Melbourne Storm, scoring a try.

== Early life ==
Kite was born in Queanbeyan, New South Wales of Tongan descent. He played junior football with the Queanbeyan Blues. He represented the Australian Schoolboys side their tour of New Zealand in 1998. He spent three years with the Canberra Raiders' lower grades sides following his graduation from Erindale College.

== Professional playing career ==
In late 2000 he travelled to Europe to play for the Tonga national rugby league team alongside Willie Mason in the 2000 World Cup tournament.

=== St George Illawarra Dragons ===
Kite made his NRL debut for the St George Illawarra Dragons against the Cronulla-Sutherland Sharks at Sydney Football Stadium on 17 March 2002. Kite moved from the second-row into the front-row following injuries at St George in early 2004. After showing good form in early 2004, Kite was selected for the Country Origin side. Kite was also selected to represent New South Wales, playing all three games in the 2004 State of Origin series. Kite left the Dragons at the end of the 2004 NRL season with both parties citing salary cap constraints as the reason for his move to the Manly Sea Eagles.

=== Manly-Warringah Sea Eagles ===
Kite moved to Brookvale Oval for the 2005 NRL season, with Manly beating off the likes of Canberra for his signature. Kite was recalled to the Blues side for the 2006 State of Origin series, where he played the first two games. Kite was also selected to play at international level for Australia, where he played in the 2006 Tri-Nations series off the bench.

Kite was selected to play for the Australian national team at prop forward in the 2007 ANZAC Test victory against New Zealand. Kite played all three games of the 2007 State of Origin series. Kite played in the 2007 NRL Grand Final defeat by the Melbourne Storm.

Kite was selected for the Centenary Test against New Zealand at the Sydney Cricket Ground. Kite was controversially not selected for any game of the 2008 State of Origin series.

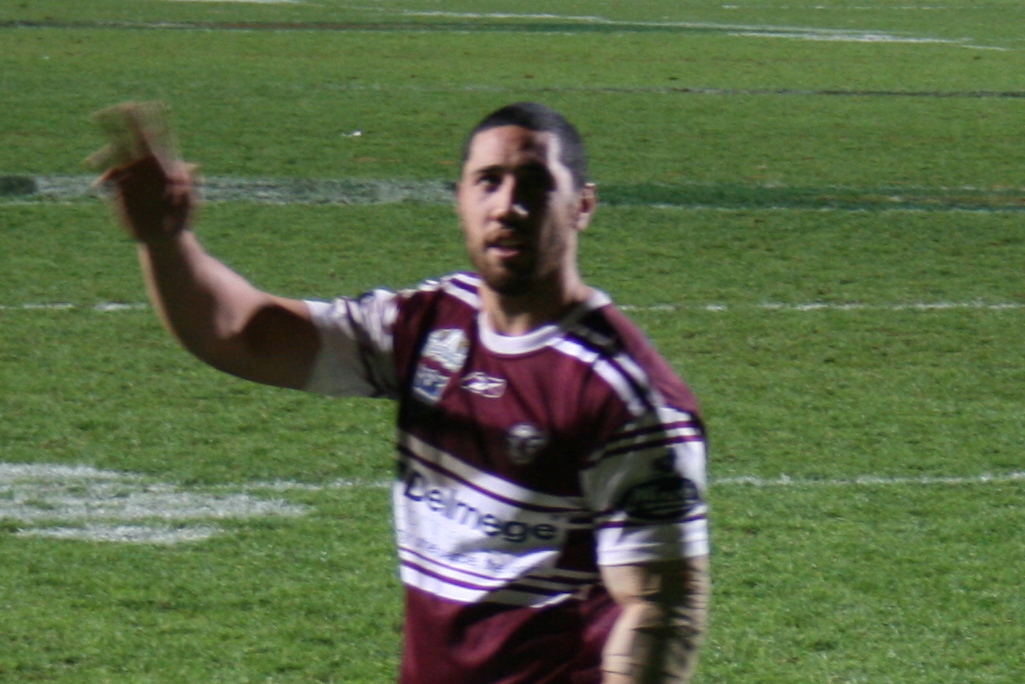
Kite playing for the Sea Eagles in 2008

He played for Manly in the 2008 NRL Grand Final, again against Melbourne. His powerhouse display which included a try in the 59th minute helped Manly to decimate the defending premiers 40–0. For his effort, Kite was awarded the Clive Churchill Medal as man-of-the-match.

Kite was named in the Tonga training squad for the 2008 Rugby League World Cup. In August 2008, Kite was named in the Australia train-on squad for the 2008 Rugby League World Cup, and in October 2008 he was selected in the final 24-man Australia squad.

In May 2009, Kite was named in the 17-man squad to represent New South Wales in the opening State of Origin match on 3 June 2009, in Melbourne. He was selected for Australia in the one-off test match against New Zealand on 8 May 2009. In 2011, Kite won his second premiership with Manly as they defeated the New Zealand Warriors in the 2011 NRL Grand Final.

In April 2013, Kite captained Tonga in their Pacific Rugby League International fixture against fierce Pacific rivals Samoa. He led his team to demolish Samoa by 36–4.

In October 2013, Kite once again captained Tonga, this time in their 2013 Rugby League World Cup campaign. However, even though he was a great leader, Tonga could not advance past the group stage. He played in all 3 of Tonga's matches.

=== Penrith Panthers ===
Kite moved to the Panthers in the 2014 season. In his first season at Penrith, Kite was part of the side which reached the preliminary final after defeating Eastern Suburbs 19–18 in week one of the finals before being defeated by Canterbury the following week and missing out on a first grand final appearance since 2003. In 2015, Kite announced it would be his final year as a professional rugby league footballer and retired at the end of the season.

== Statistics ==
| Year | Team | Games | Tries | Pts |
|---|---|---|---|---|
| 2002 | St. George Illawarra Dragons | 21 | 2 | 8 |
| 2003 | St. George Illawarra Dragons | 23 | 5 | 20 |
| 2004 | St. George Illawarra Dragons | 23 | 2 | 8 |
| 2005 | Manly Warringah Sea Eagles | 22 | 2 | 8 |
| 2006 | Manly Warringah Sea Eagles | 24 | 3 | 12 |
| 2007 | Manly Warringah Sea Eagles | 23 | 1 | 4 |
| 2008 | Manly Warringah Sea Eagles | 27 | 4 | 16 |
| 2009 | Manly Warringah Sea Eagles | 24 | 1 | 4 |
| 2010 | Manly Warringah Sea Eagles | 24 | | |
| 2011 | Manly Warringah Sea Eagles | 23 | | |
| 2012 | Manly Warringah Sea Eagles | 27 | 1 | 4 |
| 2013 | Manly Warringah Sea Eagles | 27 | | |
| 2014 | Penrith Panthers | 19 | | |
| 2015 | Penrith Panthers | 6 | | |
| | Totals | 313 | 21 | 84 |

== Coaching career ==
In 2018, Kite coached the Tweed Coast Raiders to win a Northern Rivers Regional Rugby League premiership and the NSW Country Rugby League's Clayton Cup.

In 2026, Manly confirmed that Kite is expected to return as an assistant coach with the club under former teammate and current coach Kieran Foran.
