= Group 18 Rugby League =

Australian rugby league

- Sport: Rugby league
- Formerly known as: Tweed District Rugby League (TDRL); Gold Coast Group 18 Rugby League
- Instituted: 1914 (as TDRL)
- Inaugural season: 1914
- Ceased: 2004
- Replaced by: Northern Rivers Regional Rugby League
- Number of teams: 9: Bilambil Jets; Cudgen Hornets; Murwillumbah Colts; Mullumbimby Giants; South Tweed Bears; Tugun Seahawks; Tweed Coast/Cabarita Raiders; Tweed Heads Seagulls; Byron Bay-Lennox Head Red Devil Dolphins
- Country: Australia
- Most titles: Tweed Heads Seagulls/Cudgen Hornets (1st), Bilambil Jets (2nd), South Tweed (3rd)

Group 18 is the name of a junior rugby league competition on the far north coast of New South Wales, Australia. Currently, the group has no senior competition. Prior to 2005, there was a joint Gold Coast-Group 18 competition which fielded teams from both the Queensland and New South Wales sides of the border. With the Burleigh Bears joining the Queensland Cup in 1997 and the Tweed Heads Seagulls joining them in 2003, the combined competition started to lose some of its lustre. In 2005, it was dissolved with the remaining Queensland teams forming a dedicated Gold Coast competition and the NSW teams joining an expanded Group 1 competition, now named Northern Rivers Regional Rugby League. Both Group 1 and Group 18 run junior competitions.

== Seniors ==
The Group 18 Senior Rugby League Premiership amalgamated with Group 1 Rugby League in 2005 to form the Northern Rivers Regional Rugby League, and was thus discontinued in its own right.

== Current clubs ==
In the 2020 season, there are 119 teams participating through the age groups of U6's to U16.5's. In the U16's, the following club have teams participating in the competition:

- Bilambil Jets
- Cudgen Hornets
- Murwillumbah Colts
- Mullumbimby Giants
- South Tweed Bears
- Tugun Seahawks
- Tweed Coast/Cabarita Raiders
- Tweed Heads Seagulls
- Byron Bay-Lennox Head Red Devil Dolphins (combined team of the former Byron Bay Red Devils and the Lennox Head Dolphins)

== Group 18 Grand Finals ==
Group 18 Grand Finals (1968–1997 where available)

1969 Murwillumbah Brothers 11–0 Cudgen Headland

1970 Cudgen Headland 20–7 Tweed Heads Seagulls

1971 South Murwillumbah 21–10 Burleigh Heads

1972 Gold Coast 16–11 Tweed Heads Seagulls

1973 Tweed Heads Seagulls 45–5 Murwillumbah Brothers

1974 Tweed Heads Seagulls 16–8 Mullumbimby

1975 Tweed Heads Seagulls 12–11 South Murwillumbah

1976 Cudgen Headland 19–7 Tweed Heads Seagulls

1977 Tweed Heads Seagulls 47–0 South Murwillumbah

1978 Murwillumbah Old Boys 20–11 Tweed Heads Seagulls

1979 Murwillumbah Old Boys 16–5 Tweed Heads Seagulls

1980 Bilambil-Terranora Lakes 23–11 Murwillumbah Old Boys

1981 Byron Bay 13–19 Tweed Heads Seagulls

1982 Bilambil-Terranora Lakes 22–12 Tweed Heads Seagulls

1983 Tweed Heads Seagulls 30–1 Bilambil-Terranora Lakes * Tweed Heads Seagulls also won the Clayton Cup.

1984 Tweed Heads Seagulls 35–18 Cudgen Headland

1985 Tweed Heads Seagulls 14-8 Cudgen Headland

1986 Cudgen Headland 24-0 Tweed Heads Seagulls

1987 South Tweed 20–18 Cudgen Headland

1988 Cudgen Headland 8–4 Tweed Heads Seagulls

1989 Tweed Heads Seagulls 36–16 Southport * Tweed Heads Seagulls also won the Clayton Cup.

1990 Beaudesert 20–18 Bilambil-Terranora Lakes

1991 Beaudesert 32–18 Runaway Bay

1992 Bilambil-Terranora Lakes 24–0 Nerang

1993 Bilambil-Terranora Lakes 26–4 Beaudesert

1994 Tweed Heads Seagulls 27–26 Nerang

1995 Burleigh Heads 26–6 South Tweed

1996 South Tweed 16–10 Burleigh Heads

1997 Runaway Bay 18–17 Cudgen Headland
