= Karl Lawton =

Australian rugby league footballer

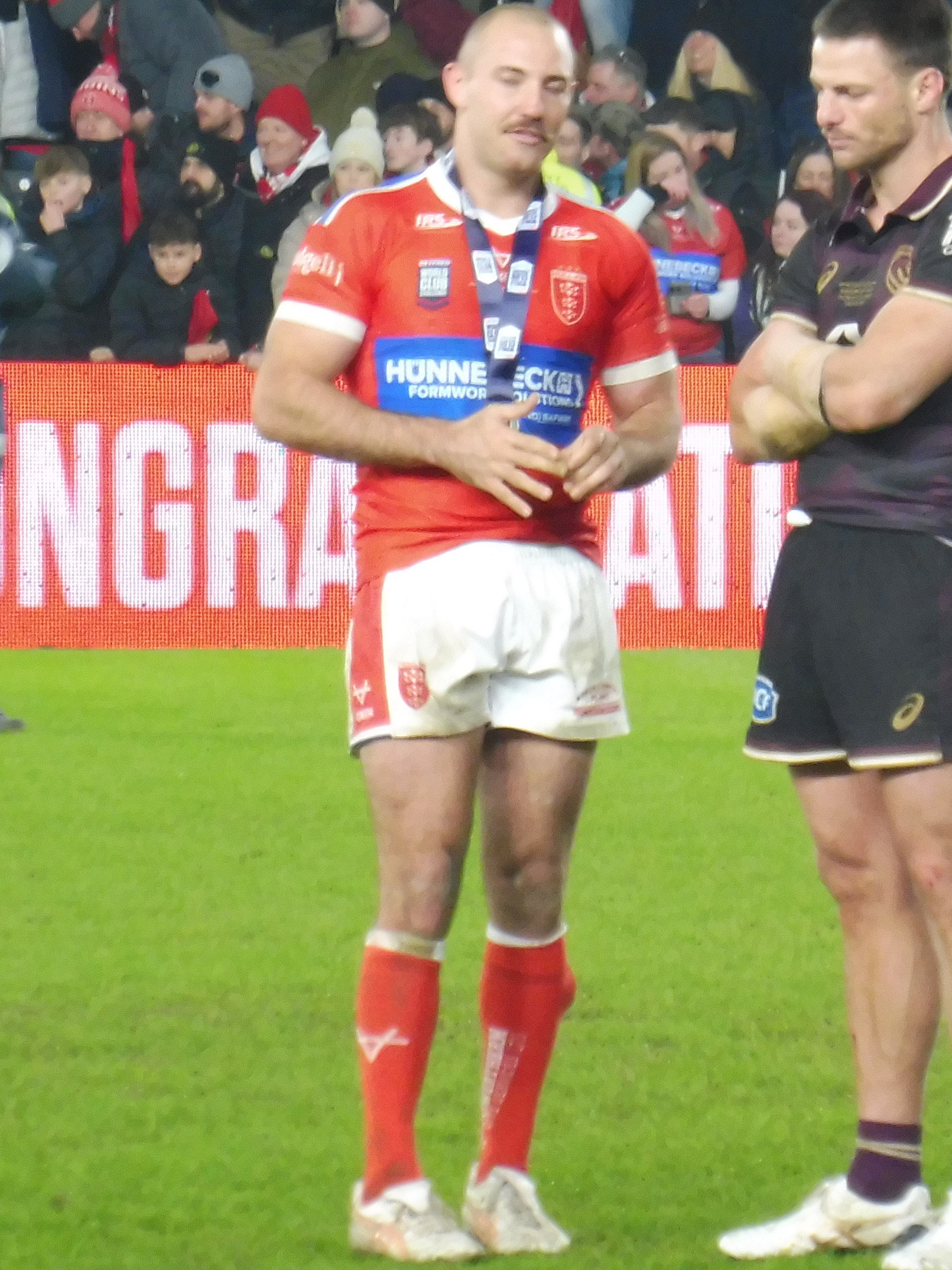

Personal information
- Born: 29 November 1995 (age 30) Murwillumbah, New South Wales, Australia
- Height: 5 ft 11 in (1.81 m)
- Weight: 14 st 11 lb (94 kg)

Playing information
- Position: Hooker, Loose forward, Second-row
Club
Years	Team	Pld	T	G	FG	P
2016–17	Gold Coast Titans	12	2	0	0	8
2018–20	New Zealand Warriors	33	6	0	0	24
2021–24	Manly Sea Eagles	59	6	0	0	20
2025	North Qld Cowboys	11	0	0	0	0
2026–	Hull Kingston Rovers	27	4	0	0	16
	Total	142	18	0	0	68
- Source: As of 15 November 2026
- Relatives: Kayne Lawton (brother)

Karl Lawton (born 29 November 1995) is an Australian professional rugby league footballer who plays as a hooker, second-row or loose forward for Hull Kingston Rovers in the Super League.

He previously played for the Gold Coast Titans and the New Zealand Warriors in the NRL.

== Background ==
Lawton was born in Murwillumbah, New South Wales, Australia. He is the younger brother of former Titans player Kayne Lawton.

Lawton played his junior rugby league for the Bilambil Jets, Tweed Coast Raiders and Burleigh Bears, before being signed by the Gold Coast Titans.

== Playing career ==
=== Early career ===
In 2014 and 2015, Lawton played for the Gold Coast Titans' NYC team. On 5 May 2015, he re-signed with the Titans on a 2-year contract to the end of 2017. On 8 July 2015, he played for the Queensland under-20s team against the New South Wales under-20s team.

=== 2016 ===
In 2016, Lawton graduated to the Titans' Queensland Cup team, Tweed Heads Seagulls. In Round 17 of the 2016 NRL season, he made his NRL debut for the Titans against the New Zealand Warriors. Joining his brother Kayne Lawton as a first-grade player, they became the first set of brothers to play for the Titans at NRL level. His debut was cut short however, as he suffered a severe leg injury seven minutes into the second half.

In September 2016, Lawton was arrested and charged with assault and destruction of property over an alleged family dispute. The charges were later dropped and Lawton was cleared.

=== 2017 ===
Playing 11 games for the club in 2017, Lawton geared up for one of his better years of Rugby League, scoring his first career try in the Gold Coast Titans Round 2 loss to the Newcastle Knights at McDonald Jones Stadium Newcastle and his second a month later in his sides other loss to the Canberra Raiders at home. Lawton finished his 2017 campaign with 2 tries to his name and 11 first grade games for the club.

=== 2018 ===
On 1 March, Lawton was given an immediate release from the final year of his contract with the Titans to take up a two-year deal with the New Zealand Warriors, exactly one week before the 2018 Telstra Premiership season commenced.

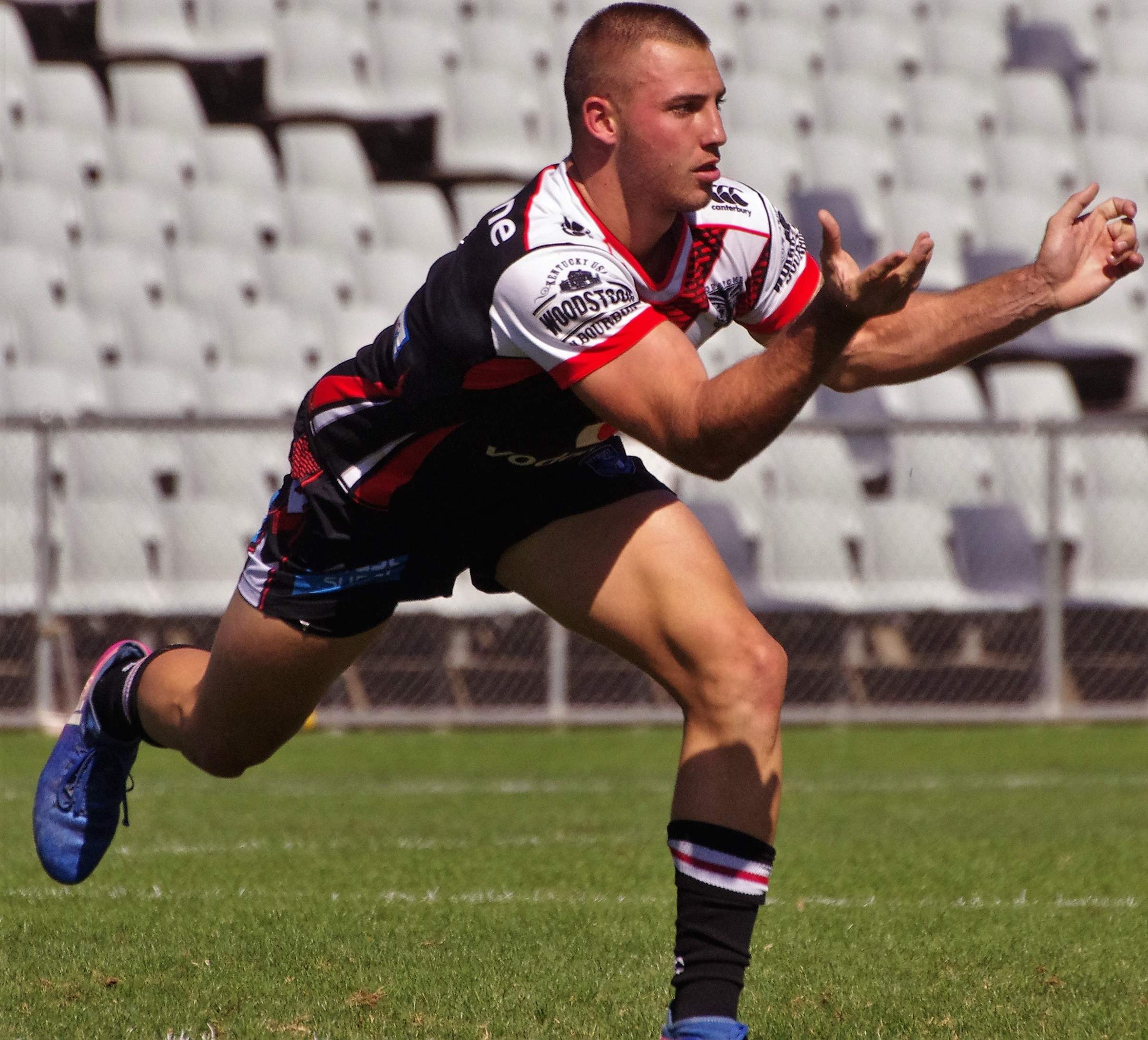
Lawton playing for the New Zealand Warriors in April 2018

Lawton debuted for the Warriors in Round 9 against the Tigers, scoring two tries, and played 6 games in all for the team this season, scoring 3 tries.

=== 2019 ===
Lawton's first game for the Warriors in the new season was on 11 May 2019, in round 9, when he came on the field from the bench for an "explosive" 20 minutes, helping the Warriors to a 26-18 comeback win against the Dragons. Picked for every game from then, on 26 June it was announced that he had signed a two-year contract extension with the Warriors, taking him up to the end of the 2021 season.

=== 2020 ===
Lawton played 18 games for New Zealand in the 2020 NRL season as the club missed out on the finals. On 21 December, Lawton suffered an Achilles injury at training which meant he would miss most of the 2021 NRL season.

=== 2021 ===
On 14 March, Manly-Warringah signed Lawton on a two-year deal.

Lawton made his club debut for Manly-Warringah against Parramatta in round 11 of the 2021 NRL season. He scored a try and was sent to the sin bin during Manly's 28–6 victory. Lawton played 16 games for Manly in the 2021 NRL season including the club's preliminary final loss against South Sydney.

=== 2022 ===
In round 8 of the 2022 NRL season, Lawton was sent off for a dangerous lifting tackle in Manly's 40–22 loss against South Sydney. Lawton was later suspended for four matches over the incident. On 7 June, Lawton was ruled out for rest of the 2022 NRL season with an ACL injury.

=== 2023 ===
Lawton was limited to only ten games for Manly in the 2023 NRL season as the club finished 12th on the table and missed the finals. On 4 December 2023, it was reported that he had signed for the London Broncos in the Super League.

=== 2024 ===
On 18 April, it was announced that Lawton had signed a two-year deal to join North Queensland ahead of the 2025 NRL season. Lawton played a total of 24 matches for Manly in the 2024 NRL season as they finished 7th on the table and qualified for the finals. Manly would be eliminated in the second week of the finals by the Sydney Roosters.

=== 2025 ===
Lawton played eleven games for North Queensland in the 2025 NRL season as the club finished 12th on the table. On 11 December 2025, the Cowboys announced that Lawton was released from the final year of his contract. A day later, it was announced that Lawton had signed a three-year contract with Super League club Hull KR ahead of their 2026 season.

=== 2026 ===
On 19 February, Lawton played in Hull Kingston Rovers World Club Challenge victory against Brisbane.

== Statistics ==
Year	Team	Games	Tries	Pts
2016	Gold Coast Titans	1	0	0
2017	Gold Coast Titans	11	2	8
2018	New Zealand Warriors	6	3	12
2019	New Zealand Warriors	9	1	4
2020	New Zealand Warriors	18	2	8
2021	Manly Warringah Sea Eagles	16	3	12
2022	Manly Warringah Sea Eagles	9	2	8
2023	Manly Warringah Sea Eagles	10	0	0
2024	Manly Warringah Sea Eagles	24	1	4
2025	North Queensland Cowboys	11		
2026	Hull Kingston Rovers	17	3	12
	Totals	132	17	64
