= Denis Meaney =

Australian rugby league footballer

Personal information
- Full name: Denis James Meaney
- Born: 1 October 1936 Manly, New South Wales
- Died: 25 July 2011 (aged 74) Ballina, New South Wales

Playing information
Club
Years	Team	Pld	T	G	FG	P
1957–59	Manly-Warringah	41	6	0	0	18
1960–66	Western Suburbs	131	12	1	0	38
	Total	172	18	1	0	56
- Source: Whiticker/Hudson
- Relatives: Nick Meaney (grandson)

Denis James Meaney (1 October 1936 – 25 July 2011) was a professional Australian rugby league footballer who played in the 1950s and 1960s.

Born at Manly, New South Wales in 1936, Meaney began his first grade rugby league career at Manly in 1957. He played three seasons for Manly-Warringah Sea Eagles between 1957 and 1959, playing alongside internationals such as Roy Bull and Rex Mossop. He then played seven seasons for the Western Suburbs Magpies including 135 first grade games between 1960 and 1966, often playing alongside legendary forwards such as Noel Kelly, Kel O'Shea, Jack Gibson and Jim Cody. He played prop-forward for his whole career and will be remembered as one of the toughest forwards of his era. He played in three losing grand finals: 1957, 1962, and 1963.

He represented New South Wales rugby league team Colts in 1958 against Great Britain but was not selected on the Kangaroo Tour. He also played for N.S.W. City Firsts in 1961. His long NSWRFL career came to a close in 1967, although he later went on to become a Country NSWRL selector for 17 years and a successful rugby league coach at Lismore Marist Brothers, who he coached to the Clayton Cup in 1987.

He retired to Ballina, New South Wales until his death in 2011, age 74. The Ballina Seagulls play Lismore Marist Brothers annually for the Denis Meaney Shield, which was named in his honour in 2010.

He is the grandfather of current Melbourne Storm player Nick Meaney.
