= Grafton Ghosts =

Australian rugby league club, based in Grafton, NSW

Club information
- Full name: Grafton Ghosts Rugby League Football Club
- Nickname: Ghosties
- Short name: Ghosts
- Colours: Blue; White
- Founded: 1963; 63 years ago

Current details
- Ground: Frank McGuren Field
- Coach: Danny Wicks
- Captain: Danny Wicks
- Competition: Northern Rivers Regional Rugby League; Group 2 Rugby League; Clayton Cup; Group 1 Rugby League
- 2019: Premiers

Records
- Premierships: 7 (2002, 2008, 2010, 2011, 2014, 2017, 2019)

The Grafton Ghosts are an Australian rugby league football team based in Grafton, New South Wales. The club was founded in 1963 as a joint venture of the Grafton All Blacks and Grafton United teams.

== Notable players ==
- Danny Wicks (2006–2016 St George Illawarra Dragons, Newcastle Knights & Parramatta Eels)
- Anthony Don (2013–2021 Gold Coast Titans)
- Daine Laurie (2020–present Penrith Panthers, Wests Tigers)

== Life Members ==
- 1970 Boyd Nattrass
- 1976 Peter Nay
- 1976 John Stokes
- 1978 Harry Blair
- 1978 Joe Kinnane
- 1986 John Morgan
- 1986 Barry Woolfe
- 1990 Grahame Brotherson
- 1996 Stephen Haines
- 1998 Greg Vidler
- 2000 Kerry Godwin
- 2000 Gary Smith
- 2003 Vic McInnes
- 2004 Michael Rogan
- 2007 Tony Duroux
- 2011 Fred Johnson

== Clayton Cup ==
The Clayton Cup has been awarded to the best team each year in the Country Rugby League which has been happening since 1937. The Grafton Ghosts have won the prestigious award on three occasions, in 2010, 2011 and 2017.

== Playing Record ==
Playing record compiled from scores published in the Rugby League Week.

Year	Group	Ladder Position	Points	Final Position	Report
1984	1	Played Finals		Grand Finalist	
1985	1	9	12		
1986	1	8	15		
1987	1	3	24	Semi-Finalist	
1988	1	2	27	Premiers	
1989	1	3	25	Grand Finalist	
1990	1	4	22	Semi-Finalist	
1991	1	1	32	Premiers	
1992	1	Missed Finals			
1993	1	Missed Finals			
1994	1	Missed Finals			
1995	1	Missed Finals			
1996	1	Missed Finals			
1997	1	9	0		
1998	1	9	2		
1999	1	9	8		
2000	1	8	12		
2001					
2002	1	3	27	Premiers	
2003	1	Missed Finals			
2004	1	6	18		
2005	NRRRL	13	6		
2006	NRRRL	12	8		
2007	NRRRL	11	10		
2008	NRRRL	1	32	Grand Finalist	FNC
2009	NRRRL	4	24	Semi-Finalist	
2010	NRRRL	1	32	Premiers	DM
2011	NRRRL	2	29	Premiers	DE
2012	NRRRL	2	28	Grand Finalist	ABC
2013	NRRRL	3	24	Finalist	
2014	2	1	26	Premiers	DE
2015	2	3	17	Semi-Finalist	
2016	2	2	30	Grand Finalist	DE
2017	2	1	36	Premiers	DE
2018	2	1	28	Finalist	
2019	2	2	22	Premiers	

== External links and Sources ==
- Grafton Ghosts on Facebook
- Rugby League Week at State Library of NSW Research and Collections
