= Michael Ross (rugby league) =

Australian rugby league footballer

Mick Ross
Personal information
- Full name: Michael Ross
- Born: 1946 (age 78–79)

Playing information
- Position: Fullback
Club
Years	Team	Pld	T	G	FG	P
1966–73	Balmain	40	9	18	0	63
- Source: As of 11 April 2021

Michael Ross is an Australian former professional rugby league footballer who played in the 1960s and 1970s. He played for Balmain in the New South Wales Rugby League (NSWRL) competition.

== Background ==
In 1964 Ross captained the Tamworth High School First XIII to win the University Shield (NSW Combined High Schools competition) and the NSW State Championship (All Schools). After high school, he moved to Sydney to study and play for the Balmain club.

== Playing career ==
Ross made his New South Wales Rugby League first grade debut for Balmain in 1966, last playing in 1973, having appeared in the top grade in all seasons, except 1970. From 1974 to 1978 he played for the Ballina Seagulls.

== Post playing ==
Ross taught economics at Ballina High School. In 2008 he was named at Fullback in the Ballina Seagulls Team of the Century.

== Sources ==
- Alan Whiticker & Glen Hudson (1993). The Encyclopedia of Rugby League Players. Wetherill Park, New South Wales: Gary Allen Pty Ltd. ISBN 978-1-87516-936-8.
- Ian Collis (2018). The A to Z of Rugby League Players. Chatswood, New South Wales: New Holland Publishers. ISBN 978-1-92102-498-6.
