= Mullumbimby Giants =

Australian rugby league club, based in Mullumbimby, NSW

Club information
- Full name: Mullumbimby Giants Rugby League Football Club
- Colours: Yellow; Blue
- Founded: 1909; 116 years ago

Current details
- Ground: Giants League, Mullumbimby
- Competition: Northern Rivers Rugby League

Records
- Premierships: 4 (1924, 1960, 2004, 2007)

Mullumbimby Giants is a rugby league side from Mullumbimby, New South Wales, Australia which competes in the Northern Rivers Regional Rugby League competition.

Mullumbimby Giants is one of the oldest rugby league clubs in Australia, playing its first competition game of rugby league in 1909. Formed between 1900 and 1903, it is now one of the oldest rugby league teams still competing in Australia. 'One of Australia's earliest Rugby League Towns'. quote taken from Jim Huxley's story on 'Mullumbimby sets the standard' Rugby League Week, 5 July 1984 page 25. Mullumbimby Giants play in all three senior competitions; A Grade, Reserve Grade and Under 18s. The Giants' junior teams compete in the Group 18 Rugby League competition. Giants are represented in the junior competitions from under-7s to under-16s.

== Premierships ==
- Mullumbimby's A grade side won premierships in: 1924, 1960, 2004, 2007
- Mullumbimby's Reserve grade side won premierships in: 1960, 1985, 2008, 2012
- Mullumbimby's Under 18's side won premierships in: 1958, 1960, 1966, 1988, 2007, 2008, 2012

== Notable Juniors ==
- Albert Broomham (1908–1914 North Sydney Bears)
- Harold King (1922–1925 St George Dragons)
- Glen Godbee (1998 Gold Coast Chargers)
- Jacob Miller (2011–present West Tigers, Hull F.C. & Wakefield Trinity)
- Dane Chisholm (2011 Melbourne Storm)
- Cody Nelson (2014 Gold Coast Titans, Parramatta Eels)
- Jy Hitchcox (2014 West Tigers)
- Jack Gosiewski (2016–present South Sydney Rabbitohs)
- Aaron Booth (2020–present Melbourne Storm)
- Ken Mcmorrow, Captain/Coached the A grade premiership winning team in 1960.
- Vic Armbruster

== Notable Coaches ==
- Ken Mcmorrow 1959, 1960
- Bill Petley 1964
- Peter Burke 1967
- Peter Hanna 1970, 1971
- Joe Grainey 1972, 1974
- Elwyn Walters 1978–79, 1981–82
- Neil Pringle 1984–85
- Con Theodossiou 1988–1992, 1996–2000
- Arthur Sauverain 2001–2003
- Graham Eadie 2012
- Chris Anderson 2024

== See also ==
- List of rugby league clubs in Australia
- List of senior rugby league clubs in New South Wales
