= Matt King (rugby league) =

Australia international rugby league footballer and coach

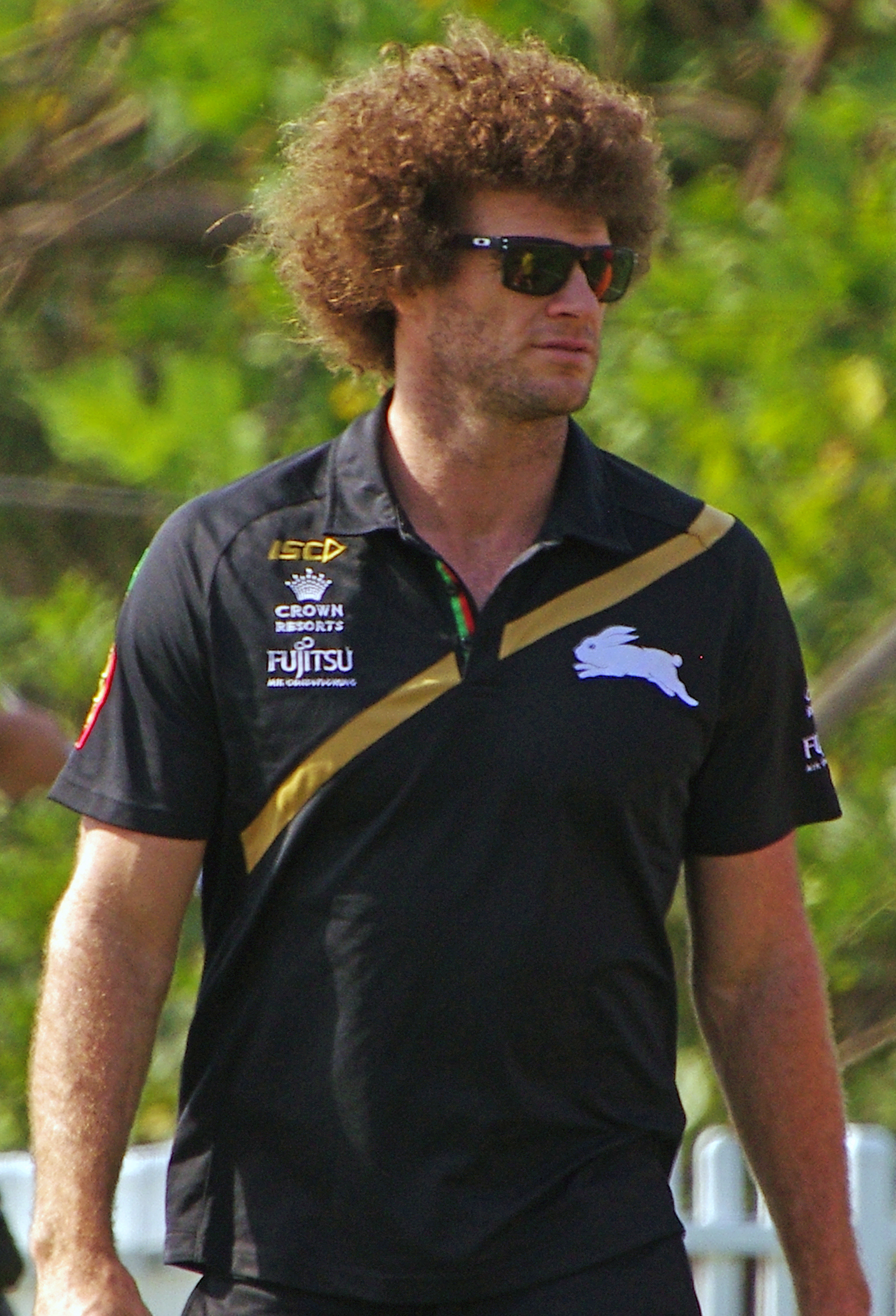

Personal information
- Full name: Matthew King
- Born: 22 August 1980 (age 46) Casino, New South Wales, Australia
- Height: 190 cm (6 ft 3 in)
- Weight: 100 kg (15 st 10 lb)

Playing information
- Position: Centre, Wing
Club
Years	Team	Pld	T	G	FG	P
2003–07	Melbourne Storm	91	60	1	0	242
2008–11	Warrington Wolves	106	66	0	0	264
2012–13	South Sydney	23	3	0	0	12
	Total	220	129	1	0	518
Representative
Years	Team	Pld	T	G	FG	P
2004–12	Country NSW	3	0	0	0	0
2005–07	New South Wales	9	6	0	0	24
2005–07	Australia	10	2	0	0	8

Coaching information
Club
Years	Team	Gms	W	D	L	W%
2022	Sydney Roosters	1	1	0	0	100
Representative
Years	Team	Gms	W	D	L	W%
2027–	New South Wales	0	0	0	0
- Source: As of 17 August 2008
- Relatives: Andy King (brother); Chris King (brother); Ethan King (nephew)

Matt King (born 22 August 1980) is an Australian former professional rugby league footballer who is the current head coach of the New South Wales Blues. A New South Wales State of Origin and Australian international representative centre or wing, he played in the Super League for English club the Warrington Wolves and in the National Rugby League (NRL) for the South Sydney Rabbitohs and Melbourne Storm. During his time in England he won the 2009 and 2010 Challenge Cups with Warrington Wolves and was also named at centre in the 2010 Super League Dream Team.

== Background and early life ==
Matthew King was born in Casino, New South Wales, Australia on 22 August 1980.

King began playing rugby league at the age of seven for his local club side the Casino RSM Cougars in northern New South Wales. When he was eleven he moved to Wauchope where he played Junior League for the Wauchope Blues in the under-11 and under-12 teams before moving back to Casino. He attended St Mary's Primary School and then went on to attend St John’s College Woodlawn for High School until Year 12 where he played in the First XIII Rugby League team under coach Kim Evans. In 2000, he was signed by the North Sydney Bears where he worked his way through the grades at the club playing in both Jersey Flegg and reserve grade. King suffered a serious shoulder injury in 2002 while playing off the bench for the Cronulla-Sutherland Sharks' reserve grade side and then quit rugby league because of a claimed disinterest.

After hanging up his boots at the age of 22, King took up several odd jobs such as working as a bar man and a garbage collector before deciding to give rugby league another go in 2003. He then signed with the Melbourne Storm's feeder club, Brisbane Norths on the insistence of former North Sydney teammate Matt Orford who was now at the Storm. Ray Warren began to refer to him as "Ropehead", after his return to the NRL with dreadlocked hair.

== Professional playing career ==
=== Melbourne ===
After moving to the Storm's feeder club in Brisbane, King played for nearly a year before being selected to make his début in the National Rugby League at the age of 23 against the St George Illawarra Dragons at WIN Stadium in round 24 of the 2003 season, impressing on his début without scoring. King went on to make another two appearances for the club in the regular season that year, scoring his first try in round 26 against the Manly-Warringah Sea Eagles.

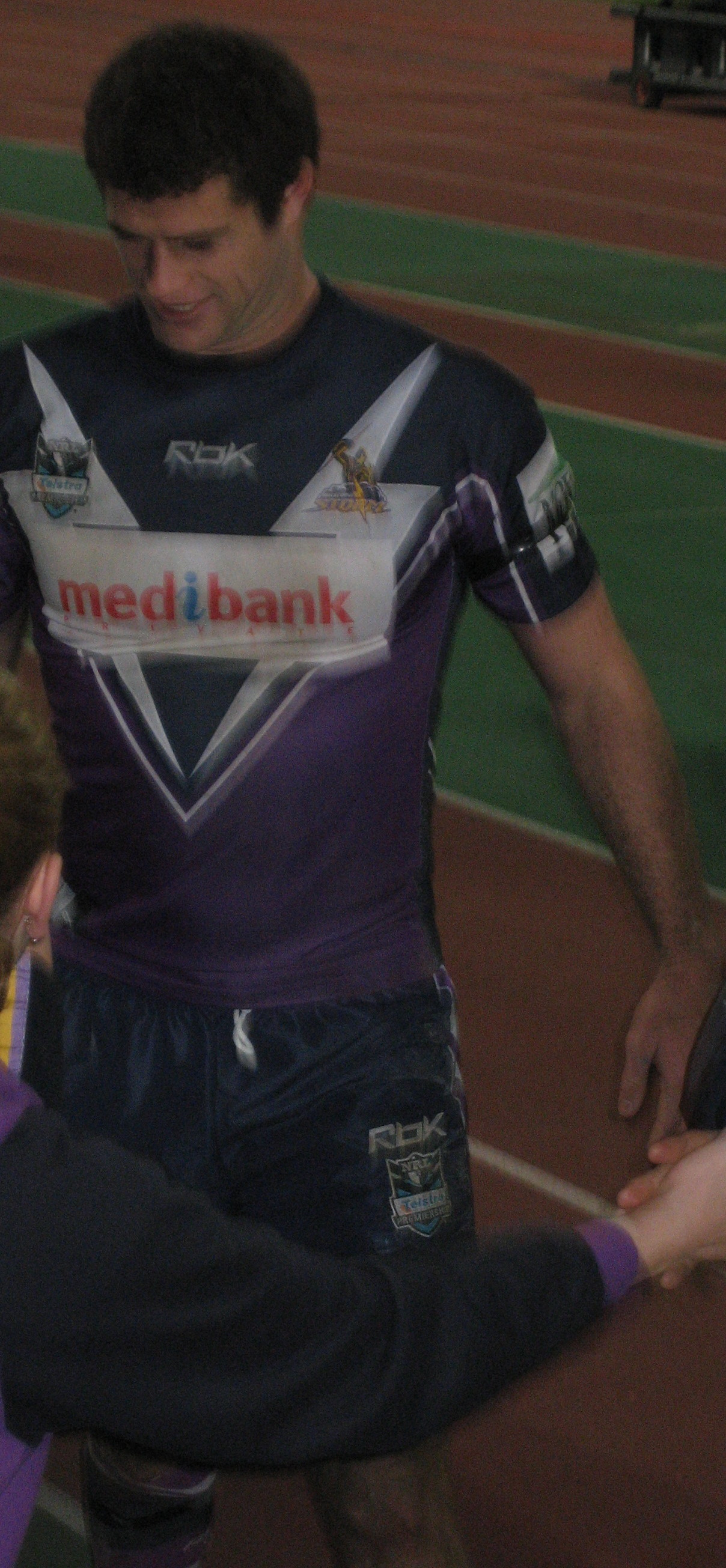
King greeting fans after a Melbourne Storm game in 2007

The 2004 NRL season saw King develop further as a player at the Storm, he cemented his place in the squad and was vital in the Melbourne side's attack, becoming a potent offensive weapon with his agility, pace, strength and ability to find the try line. At the conclusion of the 2004 club season, King finished with a total of 15 tries and had developed into one of the up-and-coming centres in rugby league. This was recognised with his selection in the annual City vs Country Origin match for the Country side. He was also named as the Storm's rookie of the year.

2005 became the season where King would stamp his mark on rugby league, beginning the season by scoring seven tries in the first seven games of the season including a set of doubles against Brisbane and Canberra and again impressing City v Country selectors enough to be again selected in the annual clash. After further impressive performances King was called up for his first major representative honour, being selected for the New South Wales State of Origin side for all three games in 2005. In the decider he became the 9th player (and 4th New south Welshman) to score a hat-trick in state of Origin.

King finished the 2005 season at Melbourne with 14 tries, and coupled with his three for New South Wales, earned a spot in the Australian international side for the 2005 tour of Great Britain. He played in every game on tour and was again selected out of position on the wing, yet played well enough to earn praise from the Great Britain and Ireland international winger Brian Carney who stated King was "the best winger in the world".

The following year in 2006 started off slowly for King, but as the year progressed he worked his way into form again. He was once again selected in the New South Wales side again for the annual State of Origin series, which NSW lost 2–1 to Queensland. After his side's 15–8 loss to the Brisbane Broncos in the 2006 NRL grand final, in which he scored a try, he cost his club $5,000 after publicly criticising match referee Paul Simpkins.

King was selected to play for the Australian national team on the wing in the 2007 ANZAC Test match against New Zealand, scoring a try in the Kangaroos' 30–6 victory. After being consistently linked with a move to the Super League during the early half of 2007, Matt King finally announced on 10 July 2007, that he had signed a four-year deal with the Warrington Wolves. The deal was worth approximately A$600,000 a year, making King one of the highest paid players in rugby league.

In September 2007, he finally realised his dream of playing in a premiership. Melbourne won convincingly over Manly-Warringah, 34–8, and King scored an inspiring try in his last game in the NRL. Overcome with emotions, King admitted when interviewed that he had been crying shortly after the victory and that this was "the best feeling ever". Melbourne was subsequently stripped of this premiership due to major and deliberate salary cap breaches.

=== Warrington Wolves ===
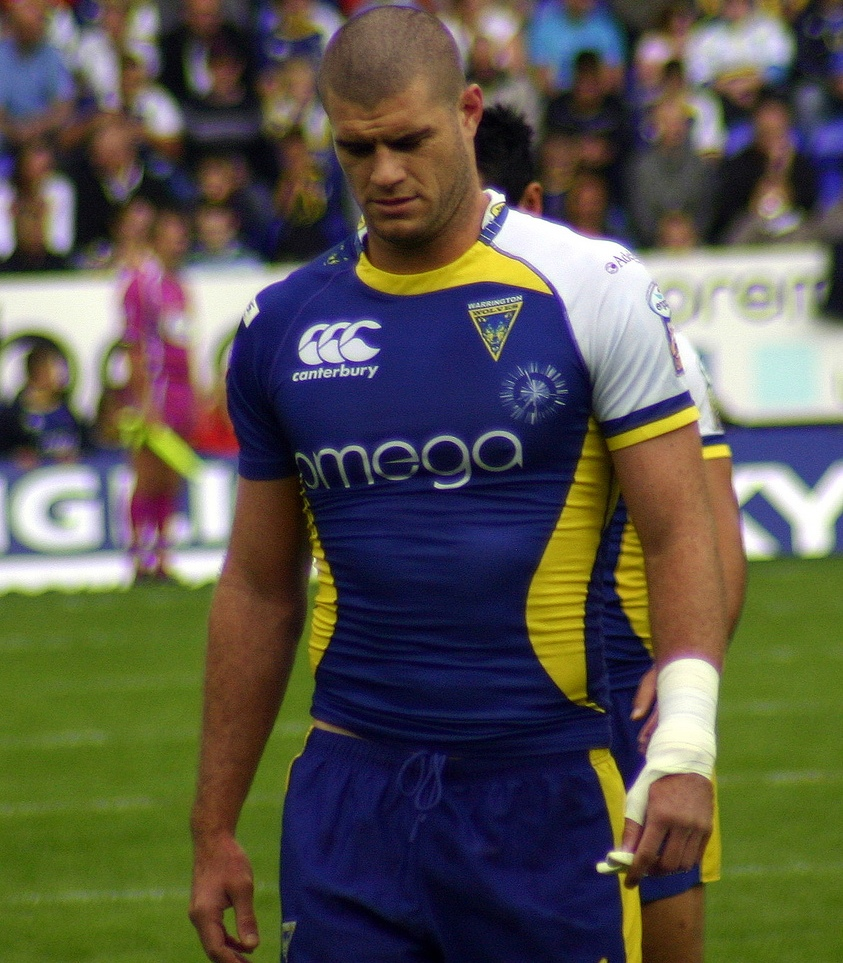
King while playing for Warrington in 2008

King started playing in England with the Warrington Wolves for 2008's Super League XIII. In the semi-final of the 2009 Challenge Cup against Wigan Warriors, King scored a hat-trick of tries to help Warrington Wolves book a place in the Wembley final for the first time in nearly 20 years. He played in the Challenge cup when the Wolves defeated the Giants on 29 August, 25–16 ironically the same day his previous club, Storm, played their last game at Olympic Park Stadium.

On 28 November 2008, King married his longtime girlfriend Kirsten Deane in Richmond who he had met while living and playing in Melbourne. His bridal party included former teammates Ian Donnelly, Dallas Johnson and Cooper Cronk, while guests included Craig Bellamy, Billy Slater and Matt Geyer.

He played in the 2010 Challenge Cup Final victory over the Leeds Rhinos at Wembley Stadium.

King was selected for the Exiles squad for the International Origin match against England at Headingley on 10 June 2011.

On 29 June 2011 King announced that he would leave the Warrington Wolves at the end of 2011's Super League XVI to join up with departing Wigan Warriors coach, Michael Maguire at Russell Crowe's NRL team, the South Sydney Rabbitohs.

=== South Sydney ===
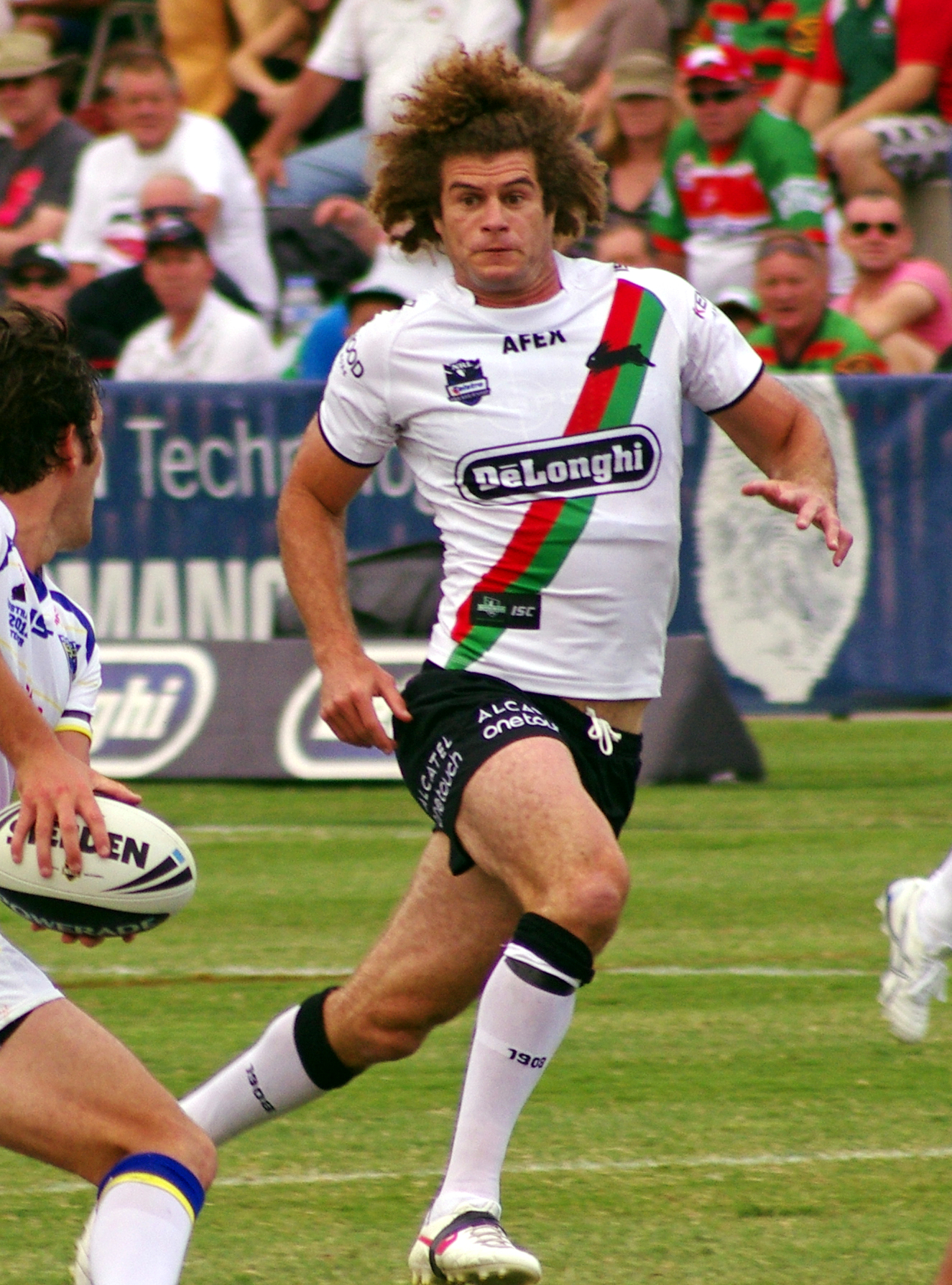
King playing for South Sydney

King joined the South Sydney Rabbitohs from 2012 onwards on a three-year contract at the NRL club, joining former Melbourne teammates Greg Inglis and Michael Crocker who had both been playing for the Redfern club for a few seasons. It was announced that he would captain the South Sydney Rabbitohs in the 2012 NRL season along with Michael Crocker, John Sutton, Roy Asotasi and Sam Burgess.

An arm injury kept King out of most of the 2013 South Sydney Rabbitohs season. King played 8 games for Souths feeder club side the North Sydney Bears in the 2013 NSW Cup scoring 5 tries. Unable to regain the form he had at Melbourne, he retired at the end of the season.

In 2015, King returned to the South Sydney Rabbitohs side for the Auckland Nines Competition scoring four tries, including the grand final winning try against Cronulla-Sutherland in extra time.

== Statistics ==
Year	Team	Games	Tries	Goals	Pts
2003	Melbourne	4	1		4
2004	Melbourne	20	15		60
2005	Melbourne	23	14		56
2006	Melbourne	21	10		40
2007	Melbourne	23	20	1	82
2008	Warrington Wolves	28	11		44
2009	Warrington Wolves	26	13		52
2010	Warrington Wolves	31	20		88
2011	Warrington Wolves	21	22		96
2012	South Sydney	20	3		12
2013	South Sydney	3			
	Totals	220	129	1	518

== Post playing and coaching career ==
King joined the coaching staff of the South Sydney Rabbitohs following his retirement at the end of the 2013 regular NRL season, contributing to the club winning the 2014 NRL premiership. Following a South Sydney coaching restructure at the end of the 2016 season, King accepted an offer to join the Sydney Roosters coaching staff.

In 2021, King was appointed assistant coach for Lebanon during the 2021 World Cup.

In 2023, King was added to the NSW Blues high performance coaching staff when Michael Maguire became coach of the Blues.

Upon Laurie Daley's resignation as New South Wales Blues coach in August 2026, King became coach of the team.

== Quotes ==
"For a winger to have the impact he did in a game was incredible, his input to the team's performance was significant, especially in the second game. He had such an important bearing on the result. I knew he was a good player but I didn't know he was that good." (New South Wales coach Ricky Stuart, commenting on King's performances after the 2005 State of Origin)

"I haven't had the rise of a normal first-grader so I really appreciate where I am at the moment and it's something I don't take for granted."
