= Ethan King =

Australian rugby league footballer

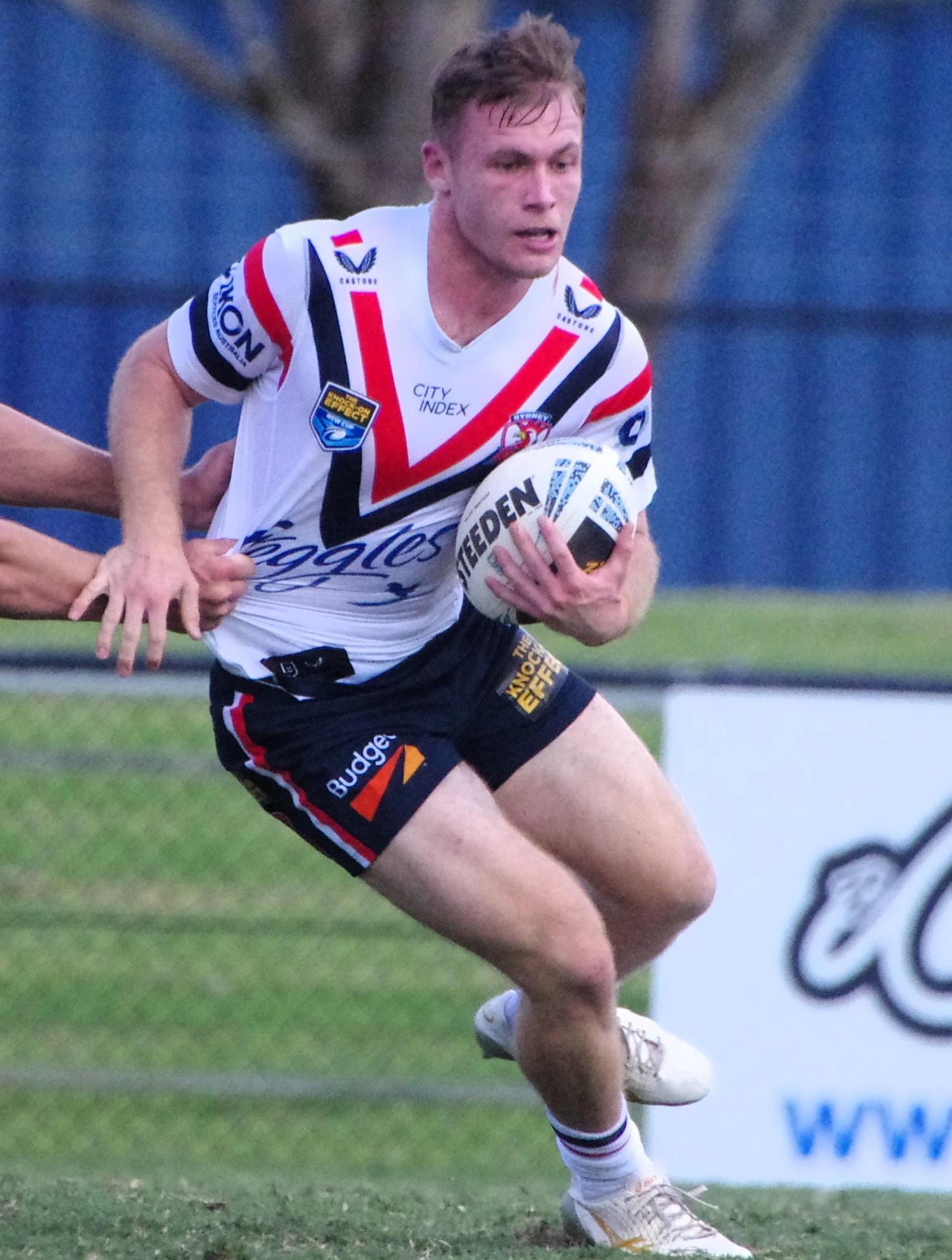

Personal information
- Full name: Ethan King
- Born: 12 July 2002 (age 24) Sydney, New South Wales, Australia
- Height: 180 cm (5 ft 11 in)
- Weight: 90 kg (14 st 2 lb)

Playing information
- Position: Fullback, Centre
Club
Years	Team	Pld	T	G	FG	P
2024–25	Sydney Roosters	3	0	0	0	0
2026–	North Qld Cowboys	5	0	0	0	0
	Total	8	0	0	0	0
- Source: As of 29 August 2026
- Education: Ipswich Grammar School
- Father: Andrew King
- Relatives: Chris King (uncle); Matt King (uncle)

Ethan King (born 12 July 2002) is an Australian rugby league footballer who plays as a fullback for the North Queensland Cowboys in the National Rugby League (NRL).

He previously played for the Sydney Roosters.

== Background ==
King was born in Sydney and played his junior rugby league for the Central Cape Suns in Weipa, Queensland. He attended Ipswich Grammar School and played for the North Ipswich Tigers before being signed by the Sydney Roosters.

King's father Andrew, and his uncles, Chris and Matt, are former professional rugby league players.

== Playing career ==
=== Early career ===
In January 2018, King was a member of Queensland's Under-16 Emerging Origin squad. Later that year he represented SEQ Green at the Under-16 State Championships.

In 2019 and 2020, King played for the Ipswich Jets in the Mal Meninga Cup.

In 2021, King joined the Sydney Roosters, playing for their SG Ball Cup and Jersey Flegg Cup teams.

In 2022, after starting the season in Flegg, King moved up to the New South Wales Cup, playing for the North Sydney Bears. In 2023, he played 17 games for the Roosters' NSW Cup team.

=== 2024 ===
In round 18 of the 2024 NRL season, he made his first grade debut, coming off the bench in a 42–12 win over the St. George Illawarra Dragons.

=== 2025 ===
On 29 October, King joined the North Queensland Cowboys on a development contract for the 2026 season.
