= Kayne Lawton =

Australian rugby league footballer

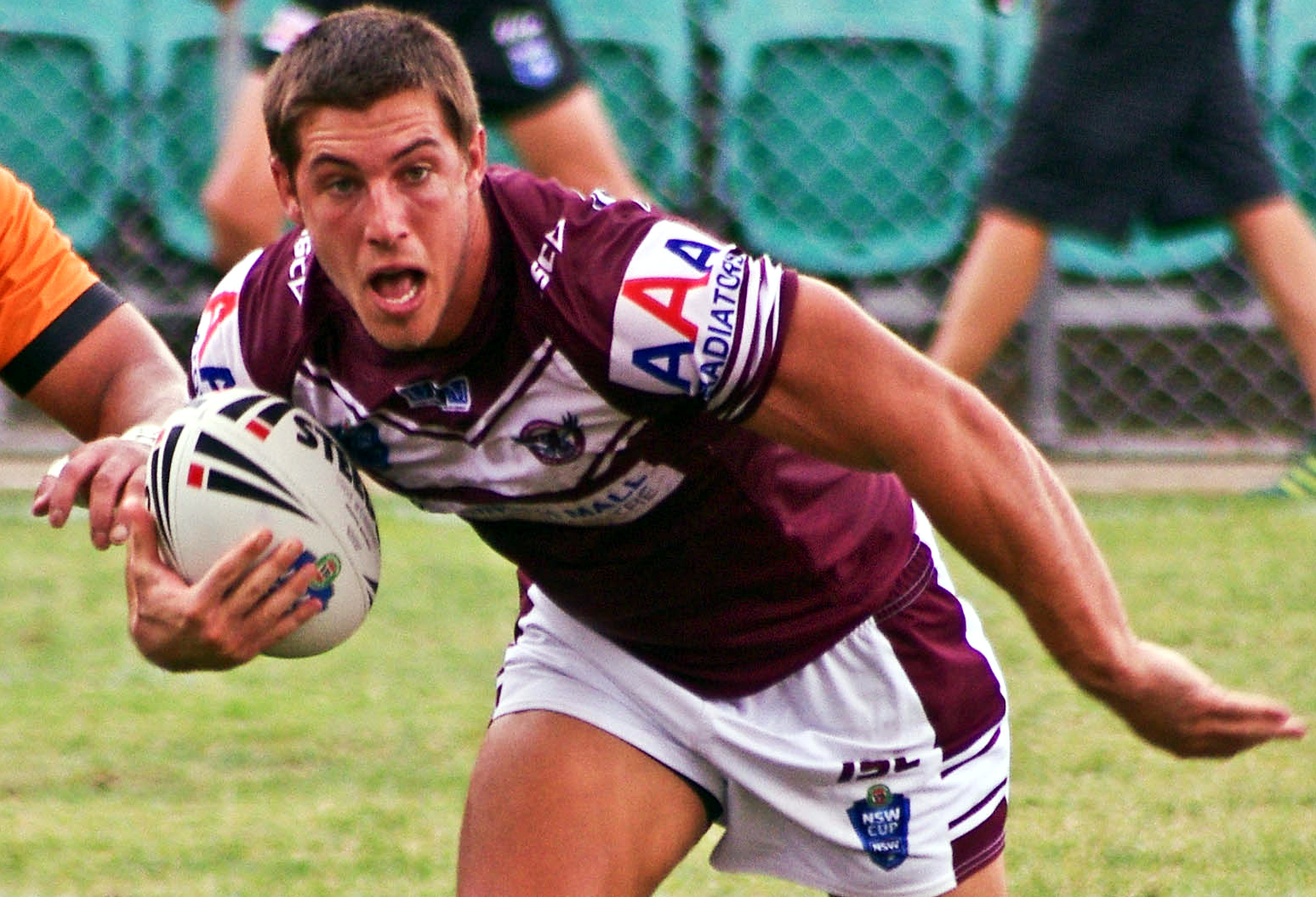

Personal information
- Full name: Kayne Lawton
- Born: 31 May 1989 (age 37) Penrith, New South Wales, Australia
- Height: 174 cm (5 ft 9 in)
- Weight: 85 kg (13 st 5 lb)

Playing information
- Position: Hooker, Halfback, Five-eighth
Club
Years	Team	Pld	T	G	FG	P
2009–12	Gold Coast Titans	7	0	0	0	0
2015–16	AS Carcassonne	9	3	6	0	24
	Total	16	3	6	0	24
Representative
Years	Team	Pld	T	G	FG	P
2011	Queensland Residents	1	0	0	0	0
- Source: As of 5 January 2024
- Relatives: Karl Lawton (brother)

Kayne Lawton (born 31 May 1989) is an Australian former professional rugby league footballer who last played for AS Carcassonne in the Elite One Championship. He previously played for the Gold Coast Titans in the National Rugby League.

== Playing career ==
He made his NRL debut in round 20 of the 2009 NRL season against the Brisbane Broncos. In the 2010 and 2011 seasons, Lawton managed to make only one appearance in each year. In the 2011 NRL season, the Gold Coast finished last on the table and claimed the wooden spoon.

On 12 November 2012, Lawton signed a one-year contract with the Manly-Warringah Sea Eagles but he failed to make any appearances for the first grade team in his time there.

In August 2015 Lawton signed with AS Carcassonne in the Elite One Championship.

== Personal life ==
Lawton is the older brother of Karl Lawton.
