= Andrew King (rugby league) =

Australian rugby league footballer (born 1975)

Personal information
- Born: 3 July 1975 (age 51) Lismore, New South Wales, Australia

Playing information
- Height: 189 cm (6 ft 2 in)
- Weight: 95 kg (209 lb; 14 st 13 lb)
- Position: Centre, Fullback
Club
Years	Team	Pld	T	G	FG	P
1995	Gold Coast	7	0	0	0	0
1996	Keighley Cougars	17	7	0	0	0
1997–98	Gold Coast	42	10	0	0	40
1999	Manly Sea Eagles	17	6	0	0	24
2000–01	Northern Eagles	47	18	0	0	72
2002	South Sydney	20	4	0	0	16
2003	London Broncos	24	15	2	0	64
	Total	174	60	2	0	216
- Relatives: Ethan King (son) Ava King (daughter); Chris King (brother); Matt King (brother)

Andrew King (born 3 July 1975) is an Australian former professional rugby league footballer who played for the Gold Coast Chargers, Manly-Warringah, Northern Eagles and South Sydney in the National Rugby League (NRL), and London Broncos in the Super League.

== Biography ==
Born in Lismore, King started his first grade career at the Gold Coast Seagulls, recruited from the Marist Brothers Rams. He played as a full-back for the Gold Coast and made 49 first-grade appearances from 1995 to 1998, missing the 1996 season when he went to England to play for the Keighley Cougars. King played for the Gold Coast Chargers in their final ever game as a club before they were liquidated which came in round 24 of the 1998 NRL season against Cronulla with the Gold Coast club losing 20-18.

King featured for Manly-Warringah in 1999 and played what was to be their final ever game which occurred in round 26 of the 1999 NRL season against St. George Illawarra at Brookvale Oval. King then had two seasons at the Northern Eagles following Manly's merger. In the 2001 season he began playing as a centre.

In 2002 he joined South Sydney for the club's first season back in the NRL and played in their first game since readmission which was against arch-rivals the Sydney Roosters. King featured in 20 first-grade games for the South Sydney club.

King was retained by South Sydney in 2003 and finished his professional career in England, with the London Broncos in the Super League.

He is the middle of the three King brothers who played in the NRL. His elder brother Chris King played for Parramatta and his younger brother Matt King won a grand final with the Melbourne Storm which was later stripped by the NRL due to the clubs salary cap breaches.
