= Chris King (rugby league) =

Australian rugby league footballer

Personal information
- Born: 29 November 1969 (age 55); New South Wales, Australia

Playing information
- Position: Second-row
Club
Years	Team	Pld	T	G	FG	P
1991–97	Parramatta Eels	96	9	0	0	36
- Relatives: Andy King (brother); Matt King (brother); Ethan King (nephew)

Chris King (born 29 November 1969) is an Australian former professional rugby league footballer who played for the Parramatta Eels in the 1990s.

King is the older brother of former professional rugby league footballer Matt King. At the end of his playing career, King was made a life member of the club in 1997.
