= Nick Meaney =

Australian rugby league footballer

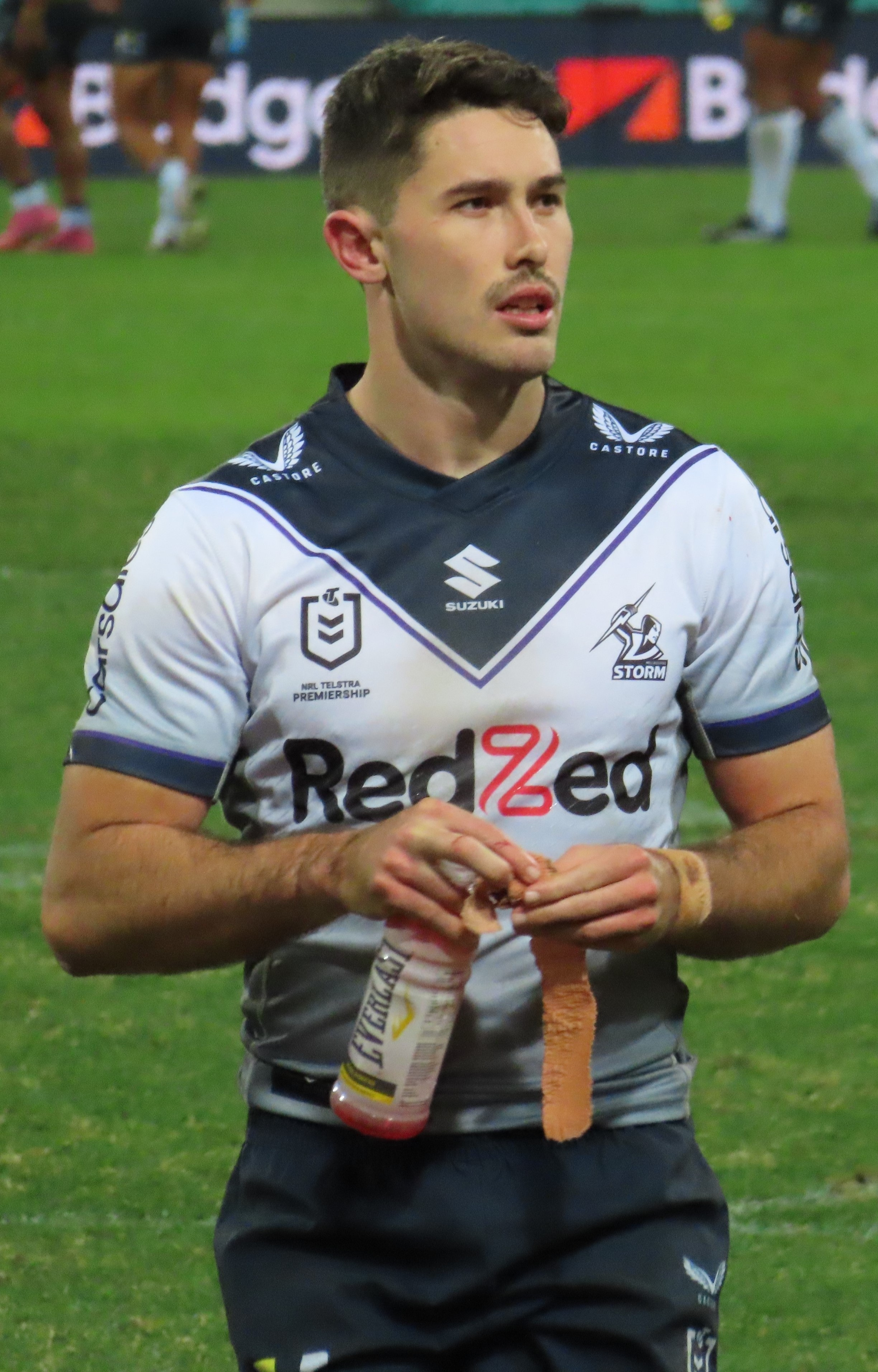

Personal information
- Full name: Nicholas Meaney
- Born: 10 September 1997 (age 29) Lismore, New South Wales, Australia
- Height: 187 cm (6 ft 2 in)
- Weight: 90 kg (14 st 2 lb)

Playing information
- Position: Fullback, Centre, Wing
Club
Years	Team	Pld	T	G	FG	P
2018	Newcastle Knights	5	2	1	0	10
2019–21	Canterbury Bulldogs	60	22	59	0	206
2022–26	Melbourne Storm	114	43	357	0	886
2027–	Perth Bears	0	0	0	0	0
	Total	179	67	417	0	1102
Representative
Years	Team	Pld	T	G	FG	P
2017	NSW Residents	1	0	0	0	0
2026	Prime Minister's XIII	1	1	7	0	18
- Source: As of 15 November 2026
- Relatives: Denis Meaney (grandfather)

Nicholas Meaney (born 10 September 1997) is an Australian professional rugby league footballer who plays as a fullback or centre for the Perth Bears in the National Rugby League.

He previously played for the Newcastle Knights,Canterbury-Bankstown Bulldogs and Melbourne Storm in the NRL.

== Background ==
Meaney was born in Lismore, New South Wales, Australia. He is the grandson of former Manly Warringah Sea Eagles and Western Suburbs Magpies player Denis Meaney. Meaney was educated at St John's College, Woodlawn.

He played his junior rugby league for the Ballina Seagulls, before being signed by the Newcastle Knights.

== Playing career ==
=== Early years ===
In 2016, Meaney played for the Newcastle Knights' NYC team, being named their NYC Player of the Year, before graduating to their Intrust Super Premiership NSW team in 2017. In May 2017, he was named 19th man for the New South Wales Residents in their clash against the Queensland Residents. Later that same month, he played for the New South Wales under-20s team against the Queensland under-20s team. At the end of the 2017 season, he was awarded the Knights' ISP NSW Player of the Year. In September 2017, he re-signed with the Knights on a 1-year contract until the end of 2018.

=== 2018: Newcastle Knights ===
Meaney suffered an ankle injury in the first round of the Knights' Intrust Super Premiership NSW campaign, facing a lengthy recovery period, before returning in round 12. With new recruit Kalyn Ponga establishing himself as the Knights' first-choice fullback, Meaney signed a 3-year contract with the Canterbury-Bankstown Bulldogs starting in 2019, looking for a better opportunity to play first-grade. In round 18 of the 2018 NRL season, he made his NRL debut for the Knights against the Parramatta Eels, after a hamstring injury to Ponga. He went on to play five games in his debut year, scoring two tries and kicking one goal, his final game for the Knights, playing at fullback in his side's 14-24 loss against the St. George Illawarra Dragons in round 25.

=== 2019–2021: Canterbury-Bankstown Bulldogs ===
In round 25 of the 2019 NRL season, Meaney scored a hat-trick and kicked five goals as Canterbury defeated Brisbane 30-14 at ANZ Stadium in the last match of the season. Canterbury missed out on the finals finishing 12th on the table.

Meaney made 16 appearances for Canterbury in the 2020 NRL season and finished as the side's top point scorer. The club finished in 15th place on the table, only avoiding the Wooden Spoon by for and against. Midway through the 2021 NRL season, Meaney signed a contract to join Melbourne starting in the 2022 season. In the final round of the 2021 NRL season, Meaney scored two tries for Canterbury in a 38-0 victory over the Wests Tigers, in a season where the Bulldogs finished 16th.

=== 2022–present: Melbourne Storm ===
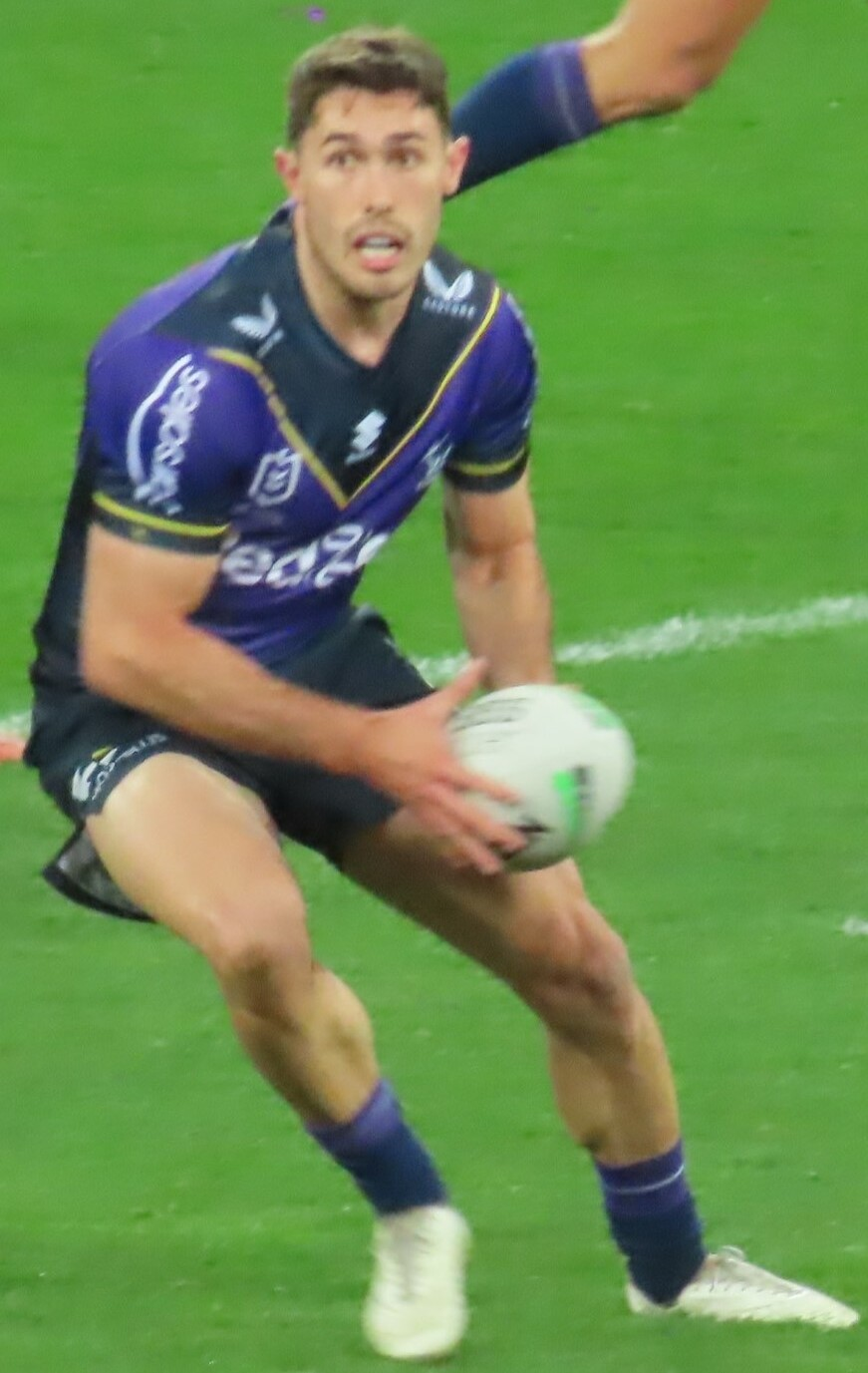
Meaney in action for Melbourne Storm

Meaney made his debut for the Melbourne club in round 1 of the 2022 NRL season, against Wests Tigers which ended in a win at Bankwest Stadium. He had his club debut jersey (cap number 218) presented to him by Melbourne Storm teammate Cameron Munster. Meaney would be named joint winner of the club's Best Back award for 2022, in a tie with Ryan Papenhuyzen. In round 8 of the 2023 NRL season, Meaney scored two tries and kicked five goals in Melbourne's 30-22 victory over the New Zealand Warriors.

=== 2023 ===
Meaney played 25 games for Melbourne in the 2023 NRL season as the club finished third on the table. Meaney played in Melbourne's preliminary final loss against the Penrith Panthers.

=== 2024 ===
In April, Meaney re-signed with Melbourne on a two years deal keeping him at the club until 2026. Meaney played 24 games for Melbourne in the 2024 NRL season as the club finished first on the ladder, claiming the J.J Giltinan Shield. Meaney played in Melbourne's 2024 NRL Grand Final loss to Penrith.

=== 2025 ===
Meaney played 22 games for Melbourne in the 2025 NRL season including their 26-22 2025 NRL Grand Final loss against Brisbane.

=== 2026 ===
On 9 January, Melbourne announced that Meaney would depart the club at the end of the season, he had signed a long term deal with the Perth Bears. A day later, the Perth club confirmed Meaney had signed with the club for three years.

He made his Prime Minister's XIII début on 3 October 2026 in the 10-60 win over PNG Prime Minister's XIII in Port Moresby, scoring 1 try and 7 goals.

== Statistics ==
Year	Team	Games	Tries	Goals	Pts
2018	Newcastle Knights	5	2	1	10
2019	Canterbury-Bankstown Bulldogs	22	6	32	88
2020	Canterbury-Bankstown Bulldogs	16	6	22	68
2021	Canterbury-Bankstown Bulldogs	22	10	5	50
2022	Melbourne Storm	23	13	48	148
2023	Melbourne Storm	25	10	91	222
2024	Melbourne Storm	24	5	106	232
2025	Melbourne Storm	22	10	46	132
2026	Melbourne Storm	20	5	66	152
2027	Perth Bears				
	Totals	179	67	417	1102
