= Byron Bay Red Devils =

Australian rugby league club, based in Byron Bay, NSW

Club information
- Full name: Byron Bay Red Devils Rugby League Football Club
- Nickname(s): The Red Devils
- Colours: White; Red
- Founded: 1914; 111 years ago

Current details
- Ground(s): Red Devil Park
- Competition: Northern Rivers Regional Rugby League, Group 18 Rugby League
- 2023: 8th
- Current season

Records
- Premierships: 2008, 1996, 1995, 1981

The Byron Bay Red Devils are an Australian rugby league football team based in Byron Bay, New South Wales.

Their senior grades play in the Northern Rivers Regional Rugby League, while the junior teams play in Group 18 Rugby League

== See also ==
- List of rugby league clubs in Australia
- List of senior rugby league clubs in New South Wales
