= Ballina Seagulls =

Australian rugby league club, based in Ballina, NSW

Club information
- Full name: Ballina Seagulls Rugby League Football Club
- Short name: Seagulls
- Colours: Dark blue Sky blue White; Black
- Founded: 1920; 106 years ago
- Website: Official website

Current details
- Ground: Kingsford Smith Park
- CEO: Brad Mansfield
- Captain: Jamie Lyon
- Competition: Northern Rivers Regional Rugby League; Group 1 Rugby League

Records
- Premierships: 5 (2013, 2014, 2015, 2017, 2019)

Ballina Seagulls Rugby League Football Club is an Australian rugby league football club based in Ballina, New South Wales formed in the late 1920s. The club has both junior and senior teams.

== Team of the century ==
To coincide with the centenary of Rugby League in Australia, the Seagulls picked their team of the century:

- Fullback: Michael Ross.
- Wingers: Brian Adam, Len McMullen.
- Centres: Jack Reardon (captain), Brad Mansfield.
- Five-eighth: Chris Storrier.
- Halfback: Wayne Cullen.
- Lock: Shane Miles.
- Second-row: Mitchell Aubusson, Michael Boyd.
- Front-row: Frank Curran, Mick Koellner.
- Hooker: Brenton Bowen.
- Reserve backs: Dick Roberts, Darren Hampton, Ron Cooper.
- Reserve forwards: Max Beecher, Josh Mather, Keith ‘Sprogs’ Miller.
- Coach: Greg Fryer.

== Notable juniors ==
- Frank Curran (1931–37 South Sydney Rabbitohs)
- Mick Koellner South Sydney
- Danny Sharpe 1988-1991 Gold Coast Giants / Gold Coast Seagulls
- Mitchell Aubusson (2007–2020 Sydney Roosters)
- James Aubusson (2007–2010 Melbourne Storm & Sydney Roosters)
- James Roberts (2011–present South Sydney Rabbitohs, Penrith Panthers, Gold Coast Titans & Brisbane Broncos)
- Caleb Binge (2014 Gold Coast Titans)
- Brian Kelly (2017–present Manly Sea Eagles & Gold Coast Titans)
- Nick Meaney (2018–present Newcastle Knights, Canterbury & Melbourne Storm)
- Harrison Graham (2023–present Redcliffe Dolphins)

== See also ==
- List of rugby league clubs in Australia
- List of senior rugby league clubs in New South Wales
