= Cudgen Hornets =

Australian rugby league club, based in Kingscliff, NSW

Club information
- Full name: Cudgen Rugby League Football Club
- Nickname: Hornets
- Colours: Green, Gold
- Founded: 1950; 76 years ago

Current details
- Ground: Ned Byrne Field, Kingscliff
- Competition: Gold Coast Rugby League

Records
- Premierships: 1 (2006)

The Cudgen Rugby League Football Club, more commonly known as the Cudgen Hornets, was formed in 1950 and plays at Ned Byrne Field at Kingscliff. It competes in the Gold Coast Rugby League.

Cudgen Hornets Seniors compete in the Gold Coast/Tweed Bycroft Cup and fields teams in the age groups of Under 17's, Under 19's, Reserve Grade, and First Grade. The Cudgen Juniors compete in the New South Wales Group 18 competition from under 7's through to under 16's.

== Notable Juniors ==
- Col Bentley (Penrith Panthers)
- Jamie Mathiou (North Queensland Cowboys & Leeds Rhinos)
- Max Bryant (2018–present Brisbane Heat Cricket)
- Matt Daylight (1995–2001 Adelaide Rams & Gateshead Thunder)
- Bill Dunn (Cronulla-Sutherland Sharks & Illawarra Steelers & Western Suburbs Magpies)
- Matt Seers (North Sydney Bears & Wests Tigers)
- Tom Weaver (2023- Gold Coast Titans)
- Jaylan De Groot (2024- Gold Coast Titans)

== See also ==
- List of rugby league clubs in Australia
- List of senior rugby league clubs in New South Wales
