= Tweed Coast Raiders =

Australian rugby league club, based in Cabarita Beach, NSW

Club information
- Full name: Tweed Coast Raiders Rugby League Football Club
- Nickname: Raiders
- Colours: Primary: Lime Green; Secondary: White; Blue; Yellow
- Founded: 1980; 46 years ago

Current details
- Ground: Les Burger Fields
- Coach: Drew Lanston
- Competition: Northern Rivers Regional Rugby League; Gold Coast Rugby League

Records
- Premierships: 2 (2011, 2018,)

The Tweed Coast Raiders is an Australian rugby league club. It was formed in 1980 and currently field male and female teams in all junior grades of the Northern Rivers Regional Rugby League and Gold Coast Rugby League. The club is based at Les Burger Fields in Cabarita Beach, New South Wales.

== Notable Juniors ==
- Michael Gordon
- Karl Lawton (2016–present Gold Coast Titans & New Zealand Warriors)

== See also ==
- List of rugby league clubs in Australia
- List of senior rugby league clubs in New South Wales
