= Northern Rivers Regional Rugby League =

League in New South Wales, Australia

- Sport: Rugby league
- Formerly known as: Group 1 Rugby League / Group 18 Rugby League
- Instituted: 2005
- Inaugural season: 2005
- Number of teams: 13
- Country: Australia
- Premiers: Casino Cougars (2026)
- Most titles: Ballina Seagulls (7 titles)
- Website: NRRRL Facebook
- Broadcast partner: BarTV

The Northern Rivers Regional Rugby League (NRRRL) is a rugby league competition run in the far north of New South Wales, Australia. It is run under the auspices of the Country Rugby League. The league formed in 2005 as an extended Group 1 Rugby League competition, featuring teams from Group 18 Rugby League. Prior to this, teams from Group 18 played in a competition with teams from the Gold Coast region of Queensland; these clubs have since gone on to form the Gold Coast Rugby League competition. Both Group 1 and Group 18 continue to run junior competitions from Under 5s to Under 16s.

The competitions run by NRRRL include: First grade, Reserve grade, Under-18's and Ladies League Tag.

Due to sponsorship reasons, in 2007 and 2008 the competition was known as the Retravision Northern League. As a result of the Coronavirus pandemic, the 2020 competition was suspended until August, with four clubs withdrawing. When it resumed, the competition was split in two due to Queensland border restrictions. The former Group 18 teams contested the Green competition, with the former Group 1 teams contesting the Gold competition.

== Teams ==
There are fourteen member clubs of the Northern Rivers Regional Rugby League as 2023.

The following clubs in NRRRL fielded teams in the 2024 Senior Mens and Ladies League Tag competitions:

=== Current clubs ===
Club	City/Town	Formed	Group	Home Ground	Premierships	Premiership Years
Ballina Seagulls	Ballina	1920	Group 1	Kingsford Smith Park	7	2013–15, 2017, 2019–20, 2024
Bilambil Jets	Bilambil	1923	Group 18	Bilambil East Sports Field	1	2022
Byron Bay Red Devils	Byron Bay	1974	Group 18	Red Devil Park	1	2008
Casino Cougars	Casino		Group 1	Queen Elizabeth Park	1	2026
Cudgen Hornets	Cudgen	1950	Group 18	Ned Byrne Oval	2	2006, 2023
Evans Head Bombers	Evans Head	1999	Group 1	Stan Payne Oval	0	None
Kyogle Turkeys	Kyogle	1960	Group 1	New Park	0	None
Lismore Marist Brothers Rams	Lismore	1912	Group 1	Oakes Oval	1	2025
Lower Clarence Magpies	Yamba	1915	Group 1	Yamba Sporting Complex	1	2009
Mullumbimby Giants	Mullumbimby	1909	Group 18	Mullumbimby RLFC	1	2007
Murwillumbah Mustangs	Murwillumbah	1989	Group 18	Murwillumbah Colts JRL	2	2012, 2016
Northern United Dirawongs	Lismore	2009	N/A	Clifford Park	0	None
Tweed Coast Raiders	Cabarita Beach	1980	Group 18	Les Burger Field	2	2018, 2020
Tweed Heads Seagulls	Tweed Heads	1909	Group 18	Piggabeen Sports Complex	1	2005

=== Former clubs ===
- Grafton Ghosts (joined Group 2 in 2014)
- Grafton Rhinos (replaced by South Grafton in 2013)
- South Grafton Rebels (joined Group 2 in 2014)

=== Juniors ===
The following clubs fielded teams in 2018 Group 1 junior competitions: Ballina Seagulls, Casino Cougars, Clarence Coast Magpies, Grafton Ghosts, Kyogle Tukeys, Lismore Marist Brothers Rams, South Grafton Rebels

The following clubs fielded teams in 2019 Group 18 junior competitions: Bilambil Terranora Jets, Byron Bay Lennox Head Red Devils/Dolphins, Cudgen Headland Hornets, Mullumbimby Giants, Murwillimbah Colts, South Tweed Koala Bears/Ospreys, Tugun Seahawks, Tweed Coast Raiders, Tweed Heads Seagulls

== First Grade Premierships ==
Season	Grand Final Information				Minor Premiers
Season	Premiers	Score	Runners-up	Reports	Minor Premiers
2005	Tweed Heads Seagulls	44–18	Murwillumbah Mustangs	MDN	Tweed Heads Seagulls
2006	Cudgen Hornets	19–16	Murwillumbah Mustangs		Murwillumbah Mustangs
2007	Mullumbimby Giants	34–30	Ballina Seagulls	Star	Mullumbimby Giants
2008	Byron Bay Red Devils	25–24	Grafton Ghosts	FNC	Grafton Ghosts
2009	Lower Clarence Magpies	21–20	Northern United	ABC	Lower Clarence Magpies
2010	Grafton Ghosts	14–6	Ballina Seagulls	FNC	Grafton Ghosts
2011	Grafton Ghosts	10–6	Murwillumbah Mustangs	FNC	Murwillumbah Mustangs
2012	Murwillumbah Mustangs	27–26	Grafton Ghosts	MDN	Murwillumbah Mustangs
2013	Ballina Seagulls	30–24	Murwillumbah Mustangs	Star	Murwillumbah Mustangs
2014	Ballina Seagulls	17–6	Byron Bay Red Devils	Star	Ballina Seagulls
2015	Ballina Seagulls	34–6	Murwillumbah Mustangs	Star	Murwillumbah Mustangs
2016	Murwillumbah Mustangs	16–14	Cudgen Hornets	ABC	Murwillumbah Mustangs
2017	Ballina Seagulls	36–28	Cudgen Hornets	Star	Ballina Seagulls
2018	Tweed Coast Raiders	24–4	Ballina Seagulls	TDN	Tweed Coast Raiders
2019	Ballina Seagulls	38–18	Murwillumbah Mustangs	NBN Star	Ballina Seagulls
2020 (Green)	Tweed Coast Raiders	24–18	Murwillumbah Mustangs	NBN	Tweed Coast Raiders
2020 (Gold)	Ballina Seagulls	30–16	Lismore Marist Brothers	NBN	Ballina Seagulls
2021 season cancelled due to COVID-19 pandemic
2022	Bilambil Jets	30–18	Evans Head Bombers		Murwillumbah Mustangs
2023	Cudgen Hornets	18–4	Ballina Seagulls		Ballina Seagulls
2024	Ballina Seagulls	16–10	Bilambil Jets	BFBF	Ballina Seagulls
2025	Lismore Marist Brothers	20–12	Murwillumbah Mustangs	BFBF	Cudgen Hornets
2026	Casino Cougars	26–14	Murwillumbah Mustangs	BFBFRVKN	Murwillumbah Mustangs

== Ladies League Tag ==
Season	Grand Final Information				Minor Premiers
Season	Premiers	Score	Runners-up	Reports	Minor Premiers
2017	Byron Bay Red Devils	12–8	Lismore Marist Brothers
2018	Lismore Marist Brothers	22–4	Byron Bay Red Devils		Lismore Marist Brothers
2019	Tweed Coast Raiders	12–10	Lismore Marist Brothers
2020 (Green)	Tweed Coast Raiders	4–2	Cudgen Hornets		Cudgen Hornets
2020 (Gold)	Lismore Marist Brothers	18–0	Ballina Seagulls		Lismore Marist Brothers
2021 season cancelled due to COVID-19 pandemic
2022	Cudgen Hornets	14–10	Lismore Marist Brothers		Cudgen Hornets

== Juniors ==
Both Group 1 and Group 18 run independent junior competitions as was before the merger to form the NRRRL in seniors.

== See also ==
- Rugby league in New South Wales
- Rugby League Competitions in Australia

== Sources ==
Years	Acronym	Item	Available Online	Via
1967–69, 1971–96	-	Country Rugby League Annual Report	No	State Library of NSW
2003 to 2014	RLW	Rugby League Week	Yes	eResources at State Library of NSW
2007 to 2019	Star	The Northern Star	Yes	Northern Star website
2005 to 2019	-	Various Newspaper Websites	Yes	As referenced
