= Queensland Rugby League South East Queensland Division =

Rugby league division in Queensland, Australia

The Queensland Rugby League South East Division (also known as the South East Division) is a rugby league division responsible for the running of rugby league in South-East Queensland. This makes the South East Division responsible for the FOGS Cup, FOGS Colts Challenge and Brisbane Second Division competitions. This Division also administers the City team in the annual QRL City-Country match. It is also responsible for administering the game of rugby league across the Gold Coast and Ipswich. These two cities alone comprise over 7000 junior and senior players.

In 2007 the East Division merged with the Southern Division to form the South East Queensland Division, decreasing the number of QRL divisions from 6 to 5.

== Federations ==
=== Brisbane First Division ===
Team name	Nickname	Home ground
Beenleigh	Pride	Hammel Park
Brighton	Roosters	Jim Lawrie Oval
Bulimba	Bulldogs	Balmoral Recreation Reserve
Carina	Tigers	Leo Williams Oval
Fortitude Valley	Diehards	Emerson Park
Normanby	Hounds	Bert St Clair Oval
Pine Rivers	Bears	Mathieson Oval
Souths Juniors	Magpies	Brandon Park
Wests	Panthers	Frank Lind Oval
Wynnum-Manly Juniors	Seagulls	Kitchener Park

=== Brisbane Second Division ===
==== Senior ====
In 2019 the open age Brisbane Second Division has teams in the following divisions:

Northside 1 (10)	Northside 2 (9)	Northside 3 (8)	Southside 1 (8)	Southside 2 (8)	Southside 3 (12)
Aspley Devils; Brisbane Natives RLFC; Brisbane Brothers; Dayboro Cowboys; Gaters RLFC; North Lakes Kangaroos; Pine Central Holy Spirit Hornets; Wests Arana Hills Panthers; Wests Mitchelton Panthers; Valleys Diehards	Banyo Devils; Brighton Roosters; Gaters RLFC; Narangba Rangers; Normanby Hounds; North Lakes Kangaroos; Pine Central Holy Spirit Hornets; Pine Rivers Bears; Wests Panthers	Aspley Devils; Brighton Roosters; Burpengary Jets; North Lakes Kangaroos; Pine Rivers Bears; Samford Stags; Wests Mitchelton Panthers; Valleys Diehards	Beenleigh Pride; Bulimba Valley Bulldogs; Carina Tigers; Easts Tigers; Logan Brothers RLFC; Redlands Parrots; Souths Sunnybank RLFC; Waterford Demons	Beenleigh Pride; Browns Plains Bears; Bulimba Valley Bulldogs; Carina Tigers; Eagleby Giants; Souths Acacia Ridge Magpies; Wynnum-Manly Seagulls	Beaudesert Kingfishers; Brothers St. Brendans RLFC; Capalaba Warriors; Logan Brothers RLFC; Logan Wanderers; Mt. Gravatt Eagles; Mustangs RLFC; North Stradbroke Island Sharks; Rochedale Tigers; Souths Inala Warriors; Redlands Parrots; Waterford Demons

===== Junior =====
The QRL South East Division Juniors, soon to be known as the Greater Brisbane Junior Rugby League, or "The South East Stingers" is the arm of the Queensland Rugby League which administers and develops junior rugby league in the greater Brisbane area.

Its boundaries stretch from Burpengary in the North, to Beenleigh in the South and the Ipswich City/Brisbane boundary in the West. There's even a junior club on North Stradbroke Island.

Within this region are 45 affiliated junior rugby league clubs which had a combined Season 2006 total of 11,455 registered junior players within the Under 7 to Under 18 age groups. This equated to 676 teams in the overall competition for which an average of 320 fixture matches were played each weekend during the season across Brisbane. Each weekend an estimated 30,000 spectators attended those matches.

=== Gold Coast ===
The Gold Coast Rugby League Premiership currently has 18 clubs, for senior and junior. All clubs are in the junior division but not all for the senior division.

Colours	Club	Nickname	Founded	Homeground	Suburb	Seniors	Juniors
	Beaudesert	Kingfishers	1962	R.S. Willis Park	Beaudesert	Yes	Yes
	Bilambil	Jets	1923	Bilambil Sports Complex	Bilambil	Yes	Yes
	Burleigh	Bears	1934	Pizzey Park	Miami	Yes	Yes
	Coolangatta	Knights	2014	Goodwin Park	Coolangatta	Yes	No
	Coomera	Cutters	2012	Coomera Sports Park	Coomera	No	Yes
	Cudgen	Hornets	1950	Ned Byrne Field	Kingscliff	Yes	Yes
	Currumbin	Eagles	1976	Merv Craig Sporting Complex	Currumbin Waters	Yes	Yes
	Helensvale	Hornets	1991	Robert Dalley Park	Helensvale	Yes	Yes
	Jimboomba	Thunder	2003	Jimboomba Park	Jimboomba	No	Yes
	Mount Tamborine	Bushrats	1992	Firth Park	Mount Tamborine	Yes	Yes
	Mudgeeraba	Redbacks	1992	Firth Park	Mudgeeraba	Yes	Yes
	Nerang	Roosters	1977	Glennon Park	Nerang	Yes	Yes
	Ormeau	Shearers	1999	Ormeau Oval	Ormeau	Yes	Yes
	Parkwood	Sharks	1976	Musgrave Sports Park	Parkwood	Yes	Yes
	Robina	Raptors	2005	Station Reserve	Robina	Yes	Yes
	Runaway Bay	Seagulls	1979	Bycroft Oval	Runaway Bay	Yes	Yes
	South Tweed	Koalas	2012	Les Burger Fields	South Tweed	Yes	Yes
	Southport	Tigers	1931	Owen Park	Southport	Yes	Yes
	Tugun	Seahawks	1978	Betty Diamond Complex	Tugun	Yes	Yes
	Tweed Coast	Raiders	1980	Les Burger Fields	Cabarita	Yes	Yes
	Tweed Heads	Seagulls	1908	Piggabeen Sports Complex	Tweed Heads	Yes	Yes

=== Ipswich ===
Colours	Club	Nickname	Founded	Homeground	Suburb	Seniors	Juniors
	Brisbane Valley	Bulls	1962	RJ Rashford Recreation Ground	Esk	No	Yes
	Brothers Ipswich	Leprechauns	1914	Blue Ribbon Motors Field Wildey St.	Raceview	Yes	Yes
	Fassifern	Bombers	1975	Hayes Oval	Harrisville	Yes	Yes
	Goodna	Eagles	1912	Richardson Park	Goodna	No	Yes
	Karalee	Tornadoes	1994	Bluegum Reserve	Karalee	No	Yes
	Laidley	Lions	1976	Laidley Recreation Reserve	Laidley	Yes	Yes
	Lowood	Stags	1991	Lowood Recreational Reserve	Lowood	No	Yes
	Northern Suburbs (Ipswich)	Tigers	1971	Keith Sternberg Oval	North Ipswich	Yes	Yes
	Redbank Plains	Bears	1986	Redbank Plains Recreational Reserve	Redbank Plains	Yes	Yes
	Rosewood	Roosters	1977	Anzac Oval	Rosewood	Yes	Yes
	Springfield	Panthers	1998	Bob Gibbs Park	Springfield	Yes	Yes
	Ipswich Swifts	Swifts Bluebirds	1919	Swifts RLFC	Purga	Yes	Yes
	West End	Bulldogs	1914	Daniel's Park	Basin Pocket	Yes	Yes

Previous clubs in the league include the Eastern Cobras, Boonah Rabbitohs, South Burnett Eagles, Gatton Hawks and Tivoli.

== Masters Rugby League ==
=== Queensland Masters ===
- Aspley Leagues Club
- Beenleigh Juniors RLFC
- Browns Plains RLFC
- Capalaba RLFC
- Deception Bay RLFC
- Easts Carina RLFC
- Easts Mt Gravatt Junior RLFC
- Goodna & Districts RLFC
- Logan Brothers RLFC
- Mustangs Brothers RLFC
- Rochedale Tigers RLFC
- Slacks Creek RLFC
- Sunnybank RLFC
- Wests RLFC
- Wynnum RLFC
- Redlands RLFC
- Waterford RLFC
- Banyo RLFC
- Inala RLFC
- Arana Hills RLFC
- Goodna RLFC
- Souths RLFC

== Former competitions ==
=== Brisbane ===
Former top-flight rugby league competition from 1922 to 1994, second tier 1995 to 1997.

== Sources ==
- Pramberg, Bernie (18 February 2006). "Mick in a league of his own". The Courier-Mail.
