= 2024 Rugby League Pacific Championships squads =

This article lists the official squads for the 2024 Rugby League Pacific Championships which are to be played from 18 October to 10 November 2024.

For an explanation of the acronyms and abbreviations are used in the tables, please see the key to acronyms section at the end of this article.

== Pacific Cup men ==
=== Australia ===
The Australian squad was announced on 7 October 2024.
Jersey numbers in the table reflect team selection for the Week 4 Game against Tonga.
Statistics in this table are compiled from the website, Rugby League Project.

J#	Player	Age	Position(s)	Tournament					Kangaroos Career						2024 Club
J#	Player	Age	Position(s)	M	T	G	F	P	Dbt	M	T	G	F	P	2024 Club
1	Dylan Edwards	29	Fullback	3	0	0	0	0	2023	6	1	0	0	4	Penrith Panthers
2	Xavier Coates	23	Wing	3	1	0	0	4	2024	3	1	0	0	4	Melbourne Storm
3	Hamiso Tabuai-Fidow	23	Centre	3	2	0	0	8	2023	6	4	0	0	16	Dolphins (NRL)
4	Tom Trbojevic	28	Centre, Fullback	3	3	0	0	12	2017	7	6	0	0	24	Manly Warringah Sea Eagles
5	Zac Lomax	25	Wing, Centre	3	2	8	0	24	2024	3	2	8	0	24	St. George Illawarra Dragons
6	Tom Dearden	23	Five-eighth	3	1	0	0	4	2024	3	1	0	0	4	North Queensland Cowboys
7	Mitchell Moses	30	Halfback	3	1	0	0	4	2024	3	1	0	0	4	Parramatta Eels
8	Patrick Carrigan	26	Prop, Lock	3	0	0	0	0	2022	11	0	0	0	0	Brisbane Broncos
9	Harry Grant	26	Hooker	3	0	0	0	0	2022	11	1	0	0	4	Melbourne Storm
10	Lindsay Collins	28	Prop	3	1	0	0	4	2022	9	4	0	0	16	Sydney Roosters
11	Angus Crichton	29	Second-row	3	0	0	0	0	2022	8	2	0	0	8	Sydney Roosters
12	Hudson Young	26	Second-row	3	0	0	0	0	2024	3	0	0	0	0	Penrith Panthers
13	Isaah Yeo	29	Lock	3	0	0	0	0	2022	11	2	0	0	8	Penrith Panthers
14	Matt Burton	24	Five-eighth, Centre	3	0	0	0	0	2022	5	1	0	0	4	Canterbury-Bankstown Bulldogs
15	Mitchell Barnett	30	Second-row, Lock	3	0	0	0	0	2024	3	0	0	0	0	New Zealand Warriors
16	Reuben Cotter	25	Second-row, Prop	3	0	0	0	0	2022	8	0	0	0	0	North Queensland Cowboys
17	Lindsay Smith	25	Prop	1	0	0	0	0	2024	1	0	0	0	0	Penrith Panthers
18	Ben Hunt	34	Hooker, Halfback	0	0	0	0	0	2014	15	4	0	0	16	St. George Illawarra Dragons
19	Bradman Best	23	Centre	0	0	0	0	0	—	0	0	0	0	0	Newcastle Knights
20	Reece Robson	26	Hooker	0	0	0	0	0	—	0	0	0	0	0	North Queensland Cowboys
IJ	Cameron Murray	26	Second-row, Lock	2	0	0	0	0	2019	10	7	0	0	28	South Sydney Rabbitohs

Notes:

- On 10 October 2024, the NRL announced that Hudson Young had replaced an injured Liam Martin.
- Three members of the squad have previously played for other nations.
  - Lebanon: Mitchell Moses (2017 and 2022, 8 matches).
  - Papua New Guinea: Xavier Coates (2019, 1 match)
  - Samoa: Hamiso Tabuai-Fidow (2022, 1 match)
- Eight of the 21 squad members have played for Queensland, twelve for New South Wales. The one player yet to play Origin, Lindsay Smith qualifies for New South Wales.
- Three squad members have played in an All Stars match
  - Indigenous: Cotter & Tabuai-Fidow
  - NRL All Stars team: Moses
- Eleven members have played for the Prime Minister's XIII.

=== New Zealand ===
The New Zealand squad was announced on 8 October 2024.
Jersey numbers in the table reflect team selection for the Week 3 Game against Tonga.
Statistics in this table are compiled from the website, Rugby League Project.

J#	Player	Age	Position(s)	Tournament					Kiwis Career						2024 Club
J#	Player	Age	Position(s)	M	T	G	F	P	Dbt	M	T	G	F	P	2024 Club
1	Keano Kini	20	Fullback	3	1	0	0	4	2024	3	1	0	0	4	Gold Coast Titans
2	Jamayne Isaako	28	Wing, Fullback	3	4	11	0	38	2018	11	9	36	1	109	Dolphins (NRL)
3	Matthew Timoko	25	Centre	3	0	0	0	0	2023	6	1	0	0	4	Canberra Raiders
4	Peta Hiku	32	Centre	3	0	0	0	0	2014	22	7	0	0	28	Hull Kingston Rovers
20	Casey McLean	18	Wing, Centre	1	4	0	0	16	2024	1	4	0	0	16	Penrith Panthers
6	Charnze Nicoll-Klokstad	29	Five-eighth, Fullback	3	1	0	0	4	2019	14	5	0	0	20	New Zealand Warriors
7	Shaun Johnson	34	Halfback	3	0	1	0	2	2012	35	14	84	1	225	Melbourne Storm
8	James Fisher-Harris	29	Prop	3	0	0	0	0	2016	18	2	0	0	8	Penrith Panthers
9	Phoenix Crossland	24	Hooker, Halfback	3	1	0	0	4	2024	3	1	0	0	4	Newcastle Knights
10	Joseph Tapine	30	Prop, Lock	3	1	0	0	4	2016	23	3	0	0	12	Canberra Raiders
11	Isaiah Papali'i	26	Second-row	3	1	0	0	4	2018	13	3	1	0	14	Wests Tigers
12	Scott Sorensen	31	Second-row	3	0	0	0	0	2022	4	0	0	0	0	Penrith Panthers
13	Naufahu Whyte	22	Lock, Prop	3	1	0	0	4	2024	3	1	0	0	4	Sydney Roosters
14	Kodi Nikorima	30	Five-eighth, Halfback	3	0	0	0	0	2015	19	3	0	0	12	Dolphins (NRL)
15	Griffin Neame	24	Prop	3	0	0	0	0	2023	6	1	0	0	4	North Queensland Cowboys
16	Marata Niukore	28	Second-row	2	0	0	0	0	2022	5	1	0	0	4	New Zealand Warriors
17	Leo Thompson	24	Prop	2	1	0	0	4	2023	5	1	0	0	4	Newcastle Knights
18	Erin Clark	27	Hooker	1	0	0	0	0	2024	1	0	0	0	0	Gold Coast Titans
19	Jordan Riki	25	Second-row	1	0	0	0	0	2024	1	0	0	0	0	Brisbane Broncos
5	Will Warbrick	26	Wing	2	1	0	0	4	2024	2	1	0	0	4	Melbourne Storm
21	Trent Toelau	25	Hooker, Five-eighth	0	0	0	0	0	—	0	0	0	0	0	Penrith Panthers
IJ	Jahrome Hughes	30	Halfback	0	0	0	0	0	2019	11	7	0	0	28	Melbourne Storm

Notes

- On 10 August 2024, the NZRL announced that Shaun Johnson had replaced the injured Jahrome Hughes.
- Peta Hiku played 29 games for Hull Kingston Rovers in the 2024 Super League season, including the Grand Final on 12 October 2024, and a further three matches in the 2024 Challenge Cup. .
- Five members of the squad had previously played for other nations:
  - Samoa (3): Clark (2 matches), Isaako (1), and Papali'i (1).
  - Cook Islands (2): Nicoll-Klokstad (3) and Niukore (3).
- Ten squad members have played in All Stars matches.
  - Māori All Stars (10): Clark, Hiku, Fisher-Harris, Hughes, Nicoll-Klokstad, Nikorima, Riki, Tapine, Thompson, Timoko.
  - NRL All Stars team (1): Johnson
- Naufahu Whyte was an unused 18th player replacement in all three New Zealand matches in the 2023 tournament.
- Casey McLean played for New South Wales Under 19s in June 2024.

=== Tonga ===
The Tonga Mate Ma'a squad was announced on 8 October 2024.
Jersey numbers in the table reflect team selection for the Week 4 game against Australia.
Statistics in this table are compiled from the website, Rugby League Project.

J#	Player	Age	Position(s)	Tournament					Tonga Mate Ma'a Career						2024 Club
J#	Player	Age	Position(s)	M	T	G	F	P	Dbt	M	T	G	F	P	2024 Club
1	Lehi Hopoate	20	Fullback, Wing	3	0	0	0	0	2024	3	0	0	0	0	Manly Warringah Sea Eagles
2	Daniel Tupou	33	Wing	3	0	0	0	0	2013	19	12	0	0	48	Sydney Roosters
18	Toluta'u Koula	22	Centre	1	0	0	0	0	2022	8	3	0	0	12	Manly Warringah Sea Eagles
4	Paul Alamoti	21	Centre	3	0	0	0	0	2024	3	0	0	0	0	Penrith Panthers
5	Sione Katoa	27	Wing	3	2	0	0	8	2022	8	4	0	0	16	Cronulla-Sutherland Sharks
6	Tui Lolohea	30	Five-eighth, Fullback	3	0	0	0	0	2015	21	5	6	0	32	Huddersfield Giants
7	Isaiya Katoa	20	Halfback	3	0	5	1	11	2022	10	2	33	1	75	Dolphins (NRL)
8	Addin Fonua-Blake	29	Prop	3	1	0	0	4	2017	15	1	0	0	4	New Zealand Warriors
9	Siliva Havili	32	Hooker	3	1	0	0	4	2013	19	3	0	0	12	South Sydney Rabbitohs
10	Felise Kaufusi	32	Prop, Second-row	3	0	0	0	0	2015	13	1	0	0	4	Dolphins (NRL)
11	Haumole Olakau'atu	26	Second-row	3	1	0	0	4	2022	9	2	0	0	8	Manly Warringah Sea Eagles
12	Eliesa Katoa	25	Second-row	3	1	0	0	4	2023	5	2	0	0	8	Melbourne Storm
13	Jason Taumalolo	31	Lock	3	0	0	0	0	2013	17	4	0	0	16	North Queensland Cowboys
14	Soni Luke	29	Hooker	3	1	0	0	4	2022	8	1	0	0	4	Penrith Panthers
19	Keaon Koloamatangi	26	Second-row	2	0	0	0	0	2022	11	2	0	0	8	South Sydney Rabbitohs
16	Taniela Paseka	27	Prop	3	0	0	0	0	2024	3	0	0	0	0	Manly Warringah Sea Eagles
17	Siua Wong	21	Second-row	2	0	0	0	0	2023	3	0	0	0	0	Sydney Roosters
15	Sitili Tupouniua	27	Second-row	2	0	0	0	0	2019	4	0	0	0	0	Sydney Roosters
3	Moses Suli	26	Centre	2	0	0	0	0	2017	11	1	0	0	4	St. George Illawarra Dragons
20	Isaiah Iongi	—	Fullback	0	0	0	0	0	—	0	0	0	0	0	Penrith Panthers
21	Kulikefu Finefeuiaki	21	Second-row	0	0	0	0	0	—	0	0	0	0	0	North Queensland Cowboys

Notes

- Tuimoala Lolohea played 25 games for Huddersfield Giants in the 2024 Super League season and a further three matches in the 2024 Challenge Cup. He has played 82 matches for his current club and 154 matches for Super League clubs.
- Ten members of the squad have previously played for other international teams:
  - Tonga Invitational team in 2019 (5): Havili (2 matches), Lolohea (2), Taumalolo (2), Tupou (2), and Tupouniua (1).
  - Fiji (1): Wong (4 matches).
  - New Zealand (4): Fonua-Blake (1 match), Havili (1), Lolohea (1), Taumalolo (10). Taumalolo also played one match for the NRL All Stars
  - Australia (2): Kaufusi (1 match) and Tupou (1) in 2014. Tupou has played for the Prime Minister's XIII.
- Four members of the squad have played State of Origin.
  - NSW (3): Koloamatangi (1 match), Olakau'atu (2) and Tupou (10). Tupou also played for NSW City.
  - Queensland (1): Kaufusi (17).

== Pacific Bowl men ==
=== Cook Islands ===
The Cook Islands squad was announced on 9 October 2024.
Jersey numbers in the table reflect team selection for the Week 3 Game against the PNG Kumuls.
Statistics in this table are compiled from the website, Rugby League Project.

J#	Player	Age	Position(s)	Tournament					Cook Islands Career						2024 Club
J#	Player	Age	Position(s)	M	T	G	F	P	Dbt	M	T	G	F	P	2024 Club
7	Esan Marsters	28	Fullback, Halfback	2	0	0	0	0	2015	10	2	0	0	8	Huddersfield Giants
2	Steven Marsters	25	Wing	2	1	5	0	14	2019	10	5	29	0	78	Thirroul Butchers
3	Reubenn Rennie	29	Centre	2	0	0	0	0	2016	9	3	0	0	12	Toulouse Olympique
4	Delahia Wigmore	—	Centre, Lock	2	0	0	0	0	2024	2	0	0	0	0	Canberra Raiders
1	Esom Ioka	22	Wing, Fullback	2	1	0	0	4	2023	4	3	1	0	14	Western Clydesdales
6	Brad Takairangi	35	Five-eighth, Centre	2	0	0	0	0	2009	14	1	3	0	10	South West Goannas
15	Mason Teague	21	Halfback, Lock	2	0	0	0	0	2024	2	0	0	0	0	Dolphins (NRL)
8	Tepai Moeroa	29	Prop	2	0	0	0	0	2019	6	0	0	0	0	Melbourne Storm
9	Rua Ngatikaura	24	Hooker	2	1	0	0	4	2022	6	1	0	0	4	North Sydney Bears
10	Davvy Moale	21	Prop	2	1	0	0	4	2022	8	3	0	0	12	South Sydney Rabbitohs
21	Alex Glenn	36	Second-row	1	0	0	0	0	2017	3	1	0	0	4
12	Reuben Porter	27	Second-row	2	0	0	0	0	2017	8	0	0	0	0	Wests Tigers
13	Pride Petterson-Robati	29	Lock, Prop	2	0	0	0	0	2019	7	0	0	0	0	Souths Logan Magpies
11	Zane Tetevano	34	Second-row, Prop	2	0	0	0	0	2009	12	0	0	0	0	Canterbury-Bankstown Bulldogs
16	Rhys Dakin	—	Prop	1	0	0	0	0	2023	3	0	0	0	0	Newtown Jets
18	Junior Teroi	—	Hooker, Second-row	2	0	0	0	0	2024	2	0	0	0	0	Bulimba Valley Bulldogs
20	Makahesi Makatoa	32	Prop	1	0	0	0	0	2015	9	1	0	0	4	Parramatta Eels
5	Rixson Andrew	—	Wing, Fullback	1	0	0	0	0	2024	1	0	0	0	0	Souths Logan Magpies
17	Justin Makirere	—	Prop	1	0	0	0	0	2023	3	0	0	0	0	Ipswich Jets
14	Kobe Tararo	26	Second-row	1	0	0	0	0	2017	2	0	0	0	0	Souths Logan Magpies
19	Malachi Morgan	—	Wing	0	0	0	0	0	2023	2	0	0	0	0	Helensvale Hornets
–	Xavier Willison	22	Prop	0	0	0	0	0	2022	1	0	0	0	0	Brisbane Broncos

Notes

- Three members of the squad have previously played for another national team.
  - New Zealand (3): Marsters (6 matches), Takairangi (4), Tetevano (3)
- Five squad members have played for other representative teams:
  - Māori All Stars (4): Marsters (4 matches), Takairangi (2), Tetevano (1), Willison (1)
  - NRL All Stars team (1): Moeroa (1)
  - Prime Minister's XIII (1): Moeroa (1)
- Two squad members played for northern hemisphere clubs in 2024: Esan Marsters for Huddersfield Giants and Reubenn Rennie for Toulouse Olympique.
- Eight squad members played in NSWRL competitions during 2024. Four also played in NRL matches. Three played in NSW Cup matches only: Rhys Dakin (Newtown Jets), Ruatapu Ngatikaura (North Sydney Bears), and Zane Tetevano (Canterbury Bulldogs). Delahia Wigmore played Jersey Flegg for Canberra.
- Six members played in the 2024 Queensland Cup: Esom Ioka (Western Clydesdales), Justin Makirere (Ipswich Jets), Kobe Tararo and Rixson Andrew (both Souths Logan Magpies). Two also played in NRL matches.
- Five members played in lower tiers: Steven Marsters for Thirroul Butchers in Illawarra, Malachi Morgan for Helensvale Hornets on the Gold Coast, Brad Takairangi for the South West Goannas in Macarthur, Junior Teroi for Bulimba Valley Bulldogs in Brisbane A Grade, and Zane Tetevano for Wyong Roos in Newcastle.

=== Fiji ===
The Fiji Bati squad was announced on 8 October 2024.
Jersey numbers in the table reflect team selection for the Week 2 Game against Cook Islands Aitu.
Statistics in this table are compiled from the website, Rugby League Project.

J#	Player	Age	Position(s)	Tournament					Fiji Bati Career						2024 Club
J#	Player	Age	Position(s)	M	T	G	F	P	Dbt	M	T	G	F	P	2024 Club
1	Sunia Turuva	22	Fullback, Wing	2	1	0	0	4	2022	8	5	0	0	20	Penrith Panthers
2	Maika Sivo	31	Wing	2	3	0	0	12	2019	12	12	0	0	48	Parramatta Eels
3	Michael Jennings	36	Centre	2	3	0	0	12	2024	2	3	0	0	12	Sydney Roosters
4	Waqa Blake	30	Centre, Wing	2	0	0	0	0	2017	7	3	0	0	12	St Helens R.F.C.
5	Semi Valemei	26	Wing	2	3	0	0	12	2022	8	4	0	0	16	North Queensland Cowboys
6	Kevin Naiqama	36	Five-eighth, Centre	2	0	1	0	2	2009	27	10	1	0	42	Huddersfield Giants
7	Kurt Donoghoe	23	Halfback, Lock	2	0	0	0	0	2023	5	2	0	0	8	Dolphins (NRL)
8	Tui Kamikamica	30	Prop	2	0	0	0	0	2016	22	3	0	0	12	Melbourne Storm
9	James Valevatu	24	Hooker, Halfback	1	0	0	0	0	2024	1	0	0	0	0	Wests Tigers
10	Ben Nakubuwai	28	Prop, Second-row	2	1	0	0	4	2016	16	5	0	0	20	Leigh Leopards
11	Viliame Kikau	29	Second-row, Prop	2	0	0	0	0	2015	18	11	0	0	44	Canterbury-Bankstown Bulldogs
12	Taane Milne	29	Second-row, Centre	2	0	8	0	16	2017	15	4	16	0	48	South Sydney Rabbitohs
13	Caleb Navale	21	Lock, Second-row	2	0	0	0	0	2023	5	1	0	0	4	Manly Warringah Sea Eagles
14	Penioni Tagituimua	26	Hooker	2	0	0	0	0	2019	14	2	0	0	8	Canterbury-Bankstown Bulldogs
15	Kitione Kautoga	22	Second-row	2	1	0	0	4	2023	4	1	0	0	4	Canterbury-Bankstown Bulldogs
16	Kylan Mafoa	—	Prop	1	0	0	0	0	2024	1	0	0	0	0	Manly Warringah Sea Eagles
17	Jordan Miller	20	Prop	2	0	0	0	0	2024	2	0	0	0	0	Wests Tigers
18	Jethro Rinakama	—	Wing	0	0	0	0	0	—	0	0	0	0	0	Canterbury-Bankstown Bulldogs
19	Ronald Philitoga	23	Wing	0	0	0	0	0	—	0	0	0	0	0	Brisbane Tigers
20	Nathan Kegg-Smith	23	Lock	1	0	0	0	0	2024	1	0	0	0	0	Brisbane Tigers
21	Joe Lovodua	26	Five-eighth	1	0	0	0	0	2017	9	3	0	0	12	Doncaster R.L.F.C.
–	Bayleigh Bentley-Hape	24	Fullback	0	0	0	0	0	—	0	0	0	0	0	South Sydney Rabbitohs

Notes:

- Four members played for English clubs in 2024.
  - Waqa Blake for St Helens (Super League)
  - Kevin Naiqama for Huddersfield Giants (Super League)
  - Ben Nakubuwai for both Leigh Leopards early in the 2024 Super League season and then on loan to Featherstone Rovers in the Championship
  - Joe Lovodua for Doncaster in the Championship.
- One member of the squad has previously played for another nations. Michael Jennings played for Australia (7 matches, 2009–15), Tonga (10, 2008–18), Tonga Invitational XIII (1, 2019), Prime Minister's XIII (4, 2008-12), NSW (18, 2009–16), NSW City (4, 2009-13), and the NRL All Stars (3, 2010–12).
- One member has played for the Fiji Prime Minister’s XIII: Penioni Tagituimua in 2019.
- Seven squad members played in NSWRL competitions during 2024
  - South Sydney Rabbitohs: Bayleigh Bentley-Hape (20 NSW Cup)
  - Manly / Blacktown Sea Eagles: Caleb Navale (12 NSW Cup & 2 NRL)
  - Wests Magpies: James Valevatu (20 NSW Cup) and Jordan Miller (19 NSW Cup & 2 NRL).
  - Canterbury Bulldogs: Kitione Kautoga (18 NSW Cup and 2 NRL), Penioni Tagituimua (Ron Massey Cup & 2 NSW Cup) and Ratu Jethro Rinakama (U21 Jersey Flegg. Premiers & Ron Massey Cup).
- Two member played in the 2024 Queensland Cup
  - Brisbane Tigers: Nathan Kegg-Smith and Ronald Philitoga.

=== Papua New Guinea ===
The PNG Kumuls squad was announced on 11 October 2024.
Jersey numbers in the table reflect team selection for the Week 4 game against the NZ Kiwis.
Statistics in this table are compiled from the website, Rugby League Project.

J#	Player	Age	Position(s)	Tournament					Kumuls Career						2024 Club
J#	Player	Age	Position(s)	M	T	G	F	P	Dbt	M	T	G	F	P	2024 Club
1	Nene Macdonald	30	Fullback, Centre	3	3	0	0	12	2013	20	14	0	0	56	Salford Red Devils
2	Elijah Roltinga	21	Wing, Centre	3	2	0	0	8	2024	3	2	0	0	8	Papua New Guinea Hunters
3	Robert Mathias	—	Centre	3	0	0	0	0	2024	3	0	0	0	0	Papua New Guinea Hunters
4	Rodrick Tai	26	Centre, Wing	3	0	0	0	0	2022	9	2	0	0	8	Warrington Wolves
5	Robert Derby	22	Wing	3	3	0	0	12	2022	7	6	0	0	24	Northern Pride RLFC
6	Kyle Laybutt	29	Five-eighth, Lock	3	0	5	0	10	2019	14	2	10	0	28	Townsville Blackhawks
7	Lachlan Lam	26	Halfback	3	1	0	0	4	2017	13	7	0	0	28	Leigh Leopards
8	Valentine Richard	—	Prop	3	0	0	0	0	2023	6	1	0	0	4	Papua New Guinea Hunters
9	Liam Horne	27	Hooker	3	0	0	0	0	2022	6	0	0	0	0	Castleford Tigers
10	Jacob Alick	25	Prop, Second-row	3	0	0	0	0	2022	10	0	0	0	0	Tweed Heads Seagulls
11	Rhyse Martin	32	Second-row	2	0	5	0	10	2014	19	5	58	0	136	Leeds Rhinos
12	Jeremiah Simbiken	24	Second-row	3	0	0	0	0	2022	5	0	0	0	0	Norths Devils
13	Jack de Belin	33	Lock, Prop	3	0	0	0	0	2023	6	0	0	0	0	St. George Illawarra Dragons
14	Judah Rimbu	23	Hooker	3	1	0	0	4	2023	6	1	0	0	4	Papua New Guinea Hunters
15	Koso Bandi	—	Prop	3	0	0	0	0	2024	3	0	0	0	0	Papua New Guinea Hunters
16	Sylvester Namo	24	Second-row	3	3	0	0	12	2022	7	3	0	0	12	Castleford Tigers
17	Ila Alu	29	Lock	3	0	0	0	0	2024	3	0	0	0	0	Papua New Guinea Hunters
18	Daniel Russell	29	Second-row	1	0	0	0	0	2019	11	2	0	0	8	St. George Illawarra Dragons
19	Morea Morea	—	Fullback	1	1	0	0	4	—	1	1	0	0	4	Papua New Guinea Hunters
20	Sanny Wabo	25	Fullback	0	0	0	0	0	—	0	0	0	0	0	Papua New Guinea Hunters
21	Benji Kot	27	Centre	0	0	0	0	0	2023	2	1	0	0	4
–	Finley Glare	—	Five-eighth, Halfback	0	0	0	0	0	—	0	0	0	0	0	Papua New Guinea Hunters
–	Edwin Ipape	26	Hooker	0	0	0	0	0	2019	9	2	0	0	8	Leigh Leopards
–	Alex Max	—	Centre	0	0	0	0	0	—	0	0	0	0	0	Papua New Guinea Hunters
–	Khaiya Waiembi	—	Prop	0	0	0	0	0	—	0	0	0	0	0	Central Queensland Capras

Notes:

- Seven members of the squad played for Super League teams in 2024.
  - Castleford Tigers (2): Horne & Namo
  - Leigh Leopards (2): Ipape & Lam
  - Salford Red Devils (1): Macdonald
  - Leeds Rhinos (1): Martin
  - Warrington Wolves (1): Tai
- Seventeen members of the squad have previously played for the PNG Prime Minister's XIII, including the recent match on 13 October 2024. Judah Rimbu has played 3 matches. The other sixteen players have played one or two matches. Alick, De Belin, Ipape, Lam, Waiembi have not played for the Prime Minister's XIII.
- Fourteen members of the squad are current or former PNG Hunters players.
- Three squad members have played for Australian representative teams:
  - NSW and NSW Country: de Belin
  - Indigenous All Stars: Laybutt
  - NRL All Stars: Macdonald

== Pacific Cup women ==
=== Australia ===
The Australian Jillaroos squad was announced on 7 October 2024.
Jersey numbers in the table reflect team selection for the Week 4 Game against New Zealand.

J#	Player	Age	Position(s)	Tournament					Jillaroos Career						2024 Club
J#	Player	Age	Position(s)	M	T	G	F	P	Dbt	M	T	G	F	P	2024 Club
1	Tamika Upton	27	Fullback	3	4	0	0	16	2023	5	6	0	0	24	Newcastle Knights
2	Julia Robinson	27	Wing, Fullback	3	7	0	0	28	2018	9	15	0	0	60	Brisbane Broncos
3	Isabelle Kelly	28	Centre	3	3	0	0	12	2017	16	17	0	0	68	Sydney Roosters
4	Tiana Penitani	29	Centre, Five-eighth	3	3	0	0	12	2019	4	3	0	0	12	Cronulla-Sutherland Sharks
5	Jakiya Whitfeld	23	Wing	3	5	0	0	20	2023	4	5	0	0	20	North Queensland Cowboys
6	Ali Brigginshaw	35	Five-eighth, Halfback	2	0	0	0	0	2009	25	7	23	0	74	Brisbane Broncos
7	Tarryn Aiken	25	Halfback, Five-eighth	3	1	11	0	26	2022	9	6	12	0	48	Sydney Roosters
8	Millie Elliott	26	Prop	3	0	0	0	0	2019	4	0	0	0	0	Sydney Roosters
9	Olivia Higgins	32	Hooker	3	0	0	0	0	2024	3	0	0	0	0	Newcastle Knights
10	Shannon Mato	26	Prop	3	0	0	0	0	2022	8	0	0	0	0	Gold Coast Titans
11	Kezie Apps	34	Second-row, Prop	3	0	0	0	0	2014	18	2	0	0	8	Wests Tigers
12	Yasmin Clydsdale	30	Second-row, Centre	3	0	0	0	0	2022	9	0	0	0	0	Newcastle Knights
13	Simaima Taufa	30	Lock	3	0	0	0	0	2014	17	0	0	0	0	Canberra Raiders
14	Keeley Davis	24	Hooker	1	0	0	0	0	2018	7	1	0	0	4	Sydney Roosters
15	Sarah Togatuki	27	Prop, Lock	3	0	0	0	0	2019	4	0	0	0	0	Wests Tigers
16	Keilee Joseph	23	Lock, Second-row	3	0	0	0	0	2022	5	0	0	0	0	Brisbane Broncos
18	Jessica Sergis	27	Centre	3	2	0	0	8	2019	10	10	0	0	40	Sydney Roosters
19	Jessika Elliston	27	Prop, Second-row	0	0	0	0	0	2023	2	0	0	0	0	Gold Coast Titans
17	Mahalia Murphy	31	Second-row, Centre	2	0	0	0	0	2015	3	3	0	0	12	Parramatta Eels
20	Abbi Church	26	Fullback, Centre	0	0	0	0	0	—	0	0	0	0	0	Parramatta Eels
21	Jesse Southwell	20	Five-eighth	0	0	0	0	0	—	0	0	0	0	0	Newcastle Knights
IJ	Quincy Dodd	24	Hooker	1	0	0	0	0	2024	1	0	0	0	0	Cronulla-Sutherland Sharks
IJ	Lauren Brown	29	Hooker, Halfback	0	0	0	0	0	2022	7	0	31	0	62	Gold Coast Titans

Notes:

- Two members of the squad has previously played for another nation.
  - Tonga: Penitani (2023, 1 match, having played for Australia in 2019).
  - Samoa: Togatuki (2019, 1 match).
- 19 of the 21 squad members have played Origin.
  - Queensland (8): Aiken (8), Brigginshaw (17), Brown (6), Elliston (7), Joseph (4), Mato (8), Robinson (7), Upton (8).
  - NSW (11): Apps (14), Clydsdale (8), Davis (7), Dodd (5), Elliott (9), Higgins (3), Kelly (13), Murphy (1), Penitani (8), Sergis (10), Southwell (2), Taufa (9), Togatuki (8).
  - The two players yet to play Origin, Church and Whitfeld qualify for New South Wales.
- Nine squad members have played in an All Stars match
  - Indigenous (4): Dodd (6), Joseph (4), Murphy (4), and Upton (2).
  - Māori (1): Mato (4)
  - NRL All Stars team (4): Apps (2), Brigginshaw (6), Kelly (1), and Taufa (2).
- Other Australian-based teams.
  - Prime Minister's XIII (11): Apps (2), Brigginshaw (1), Brown (2), Church (2), Dodd (3), Elliston (1), Davis (1), Sergis (1), Southwell (1), Togatuki (1), Whitfeld (1).
  - NSW City (6): Dodd (7), Murphy (1), Penitani (4), Sergis (3), Taufa (2), and Togatuki (4).
  - NSW Country (4): Apps (7), Church (1), Higgins (2), and Kelly (3).

=== New Zealand ===
The Kiwi Ferns squad was announced on 8 October 2024.
Jersey numbers in the table reflect team selection for the Week 4 game against the Australian Jillaroos

J#	Player	Age	Position(s)	Tournament					Kiwi Ferns Career						2024 Club
J#	Player	Age	Position(s)	M	T	G	F	P	Dbt	M	T	G	F	P	2024 Club
1	Apii Nicholls	32	Fullback	2	0	0	0	0	2017	16	5	6	0	32	Canberra Raiders
2	Leianne Tufuga	23	Wing, Centre	3	3	0	0	12	2023	6	4	0	0	16	Wests Tigers
3	Mele Hufanga	30	Centre	3	0	0	0	0	2022	10	6	0	0	24	Brisbane Broncos
4	Abigail Roache	28	Centre, Wing	3	0	0	0	0	2022	8	3	0	0	12	Newcastle Knights
5	Shanice Parker	26	Wing, Fullback	3	0	0	0	0	2022	8	1	0	0	4	Newcastle Knights
6	Gayle Broughton	28	Five-eighth, Fullback	3	0	0	0	0	2024	3	0	0	0	0	Brisbane Broncos
7	Tyla King	30	Halfback, Five-eighth	3	0	4	0	8	2023	6	0	4	0	8	St George Illawarra Dragons
8	Brianna Clark	29	Prop	3	0	0	0	0	2022	8	1	7	0	18	Brisbane Broncos
9	Brooke Anderson	29	Hooker, Lock	3	0	0	0	0	2023	6	0	0	0	0	Cronulla-Sutherland Sharks
16	Alexis Tauaneai	20	Prop, Lock	3	0	0	0	0	2024	3	0	0	0	0	St George Illawarra Dragons
11	Annessa Biddle	21	Second-row, Wing	2	0	0	0	0	2023	5	2	0	0	8	Cronulla-Sutherland Sharks
12	Amber Hall	30	Second-row, Prop	3	0	0	0	0	2013	14	4	0	0	16	Sydney Roosters
13	Georgia Hale	29	Lock	3	0	0	0	0	2015	20	0	0	0	0	Gold Coast Titans
14	Ashleigh Quinlan	30	Five-eighth, Halfback	3	1	0	0	4	2023	5	1	0	0	4	Canberra Raiders
15	Najvada George	26	Prop, Lock	3	0	0	0	0	2023	6	0	0	0	0	Wests Tigers
10	Angelina Teakaraanga-Katoa	22	Prop	3	1	0	0	4	2023	6	1	0	0	4	St George Illawarra Dragons
17	Otesa Pule	21	Second-row, Centre	2	0	0	0	0	2022	10	1	0	0	4	Sydney Roosters
18	Tiana Davison	24	Second-row	1	0	0	0	0	2023	3	0	0	0	0	Sydney Roosters
19	Mackenzie Wiki	23	Wing, Centre	1	3	0	0	12	2024	1	3	0	0	12	Canberra Raiders
20	Cheyelle Robins-Reti	27	Wing, Centre	0	0	0	0	0	2023	1	0	0	0	0	Canberra Raiders
21	Brooke Talataina	20	Second-row, Halfback	1	0	0	0	0	2024	1	0	0	0	0	Wests Tigers
W	Mya Hill-Moana	22	Prop	0	0	0	0	0	2020	10	0	0	0	0	Sydney Roosters

Notes:

- Two members of the squad has previously played for another nation.
  - Samoa: Tufuga (1 match)
  - Cook Islands: Wiki (3)
- Six squad members have previously played for Australian-based representative teams.
  - Prime Minister’s XIII (2): Clark (1) and George (1).
  - NSW (1): Anderson (1) and Parker (1).
  - Queensland (1): Clark (1).
  - NSW City (Sydney) (5): Anderson (2), Quinlan (1), George (2), Tufuga (2), and Parker (2).
  - NRL All Stars (1): Parker (1).
- Six squad members have played for the Māori All Stars: Anderson 2, Biddle 1, Broughton 1, Hill-Moana 4, Parker 3, Quinlan 2.

=== Papua New Guinea ===
The PNG Orchids squad was announced on 15 October 2024.
Jersey numbers in the table reflect team selection for the Week 4 game against the Fetu Samoa.

J#	Player	Age	Position(s)	Tournament					Orchids Career						2024 Club
J#	Player	Age	Position(s)	M	T	G	F	P	Dbt	M	T	G	F	P	2024 Club
1	Shae Yvonne De La Cruz	28	Fullback	2	0	0	0	0	2019	3	0	0	0	0	—
2	Jenny Wesley	—	Wing	2	0	0	0	0	2024	2	0	0	0	0	Goroka Lahanis
3	Belinda Gwasamun	28	Centre	3	0	0	0	0	2022	8	5	0	0	20	Wentworthville Magpies
4	Leila Kerowa	—	Centre, Second-row	3	0	0	0	0	2023	4	1	0	0	4	Central Dabaris
5	Lyiannah Allen	—	Wing, Centre	3	0	0	0	0	2022	4	2	0	0	8	Mt Hagen Eagles
6	Sera Koroi	22	Five-eighth	3	0	0	0	0	2022	8	1	0	0	4	Souths Logan Magpies
7	Ua Ravu	28	Halfback, Hooker	3	0	0	0	0	2019	9	2	0	0	8	Canberra Raiders
8	Elsie Albert	28	Prop	3	2	0	0	8	2019	10	3	0	0	12	Parramatta Eels
12	Emily Veivers	23	Hooker, Second-row	3	0	2	0	4	2022	7	0	6	0	12	Norths Devils
10	Essay Banu	22	Prop, Second-row	3	0	0	0	0	2022	8	2	0	0	8	North Queensland Cowboys
11	Sareka Mooka	25	Second-row, Lock	3	0	0	0	0	2023	4	0	0	0	0	North Queensland Cowboys
15	Jessikah Reeves	23	Second-row, Lock	3	0	0	0	0	2022	8	1	0	0	4	Western Clydesdales
13	Gloria Kaupa	25	Lock, Prop	3	0	0	0	0	2017	12	0	0	0	0	Wentworthville Magpies
14	Delailah Ahose	—	Halfback, Hooker	2	0	0	0	0	2017	5	0	0	0	0	Goroka Lahanis
9	Therese Aiton	35	Hooker	2	0	0	0	0	2019	6	1	0	0	4	Western Clydesdales
16	Yolanda Taute	—	Prop	2	0	0	0	0	2018	3	0	0	0	0	Goroka Lahanis
17	Mala Mark	—	Wing, Fullback	2	0	0	0	0	2017	3	0	0	0	0	Central Dabaris
18	Talitha Kunjil	—	Second-row	1	0	0	0	0	2022	3	0	0	0	0	Mt Hagen Eagles
19	Meli Joe	—	Halfback	0	0	0	0	0	2018	1	0	0	0	0	Mt Hagen Eagles
20	Lilah Malabag	—	Halfback	1	0	0	0	0	2018	3	0	0	0	0	Port Moresby Vipers
21	Roswita Kapo	23	Hooker	2	0	0	0	0	2019	6	2	0	0	8	Wentworthville Magpies
–	Frida Anthony	—	Lock	0	0	0	0	0	—	0	0	0	0	0	Central Dabaris
–	Freda Waula	29	Wing, Fullback	1	0	0	0	0	2017	2	0	0	0	0	Mt Hagen Eagles
IJ	Latoniya Norris	23	Centre, Fullback	1	0	0	0	0	2022	2	1	0	0	4	Darwin Brothers

Notes:

- All members of the squad have previously played for PNG representative teams
  - PNG Prime Minister’s XIII.
  - PNG in tour or trial matches against Far North Queensland (2017), Brisbane Broncos (2018, 2019) and or York Valkyrie (2022).
- Two members of the squad have previously played for Australian-based representative teams
  - Indigenous All Stars: Banu & Mooka.
  - Australian Prime Minister’s XIII: Mooka (2022)

== Pacific Bowl women ==
=== Cook Islands ===
The Cook Islands Moana squad was announced on 9 October 2024.
Jersey numbers in the table reflect team selection for the Week 2 game against Fiji Bulikula

J#	Player	Age	Position(s)	Tournament					Moana Career						2024 Club
J#	Player	Age	Position(s)	M	T	G	F	P	Dbt	M	T	G	F	P	2024 Club
1	Kiana Takairangi	32	Fullback, Centre	1	0	0	0	0	2017	6	1	0	0	4	South Sydney Rabbitohs
2	Chantelle Holloway-Samuels	25	Wing, Centre	1	0	0	0	0	2023	2	1	0	0	4	Tweed Heads Seagulls
3	Tyler Birch	29	Centre	1	0	0	0	0	2024	1	0	0	0	0	Burleigh Bears
4	Kaiyah Atai	—	Centre, Second-row	1	0	0	0	0	2023	2	0	0	0	0	Richmond Roses
5	Kiarah Siauane	19	Wing, Centre	1	0	0	0	0	2024	1	0	0	0	0	Souths Logan Magpies
6	Charntay Poko	29	Five-eighth, Lock	1	0	1	0	2	2024	1	0	1	0	2	Papanui Tigers
7	Lydia Turua-Quedley	25	Halfback	1	0	0	0	0	2017	5	0	0	0	0	Richmond Roses
8	Crystal Tamarua	29	Prop, Second-row	1	0	0	0	0	2017	4	0	0	0	0	Runaway Bay Seagulls
9	Chelsea Makira	20	Hooker	1	0	0	0	0	2023	2	1	0	0	4	Parramatta Eels
10	April Ngatupuna	21	Prop, Lock	1	0	0	0	0	2022	1	0	0	0	0	—
11	Jazmon Tupou-Witchman	21	Second-row, Prop	1	0	0	0	0	2022	5	0	0	0	0	North Queensland Cowboys
12	Kerehitina Matua	25	Second-row	1	1	0	0	4	2022	5	1	3	0	10	Canberra Raiders
13	Anneka Stephens	35	Lock	1	0	0	0	0	2022	5	0	0	0	0	Joondalup Giants
14	Jodeci Joseph	—	Centre	1	0	0	0	0	2023	2	0	0	0	0	Papakura Sea Eagles
15	Lavinia Kitai	20	Prop	1	0	0	0	0	2022	5	0	0	0	0	Cronulla-Sutherland Sharks
18	Tahleisha Maeva	21	Second-row	1	0	0	0	0	2024	1	0	0	0	0	Parramatta Eels
19	Ryvrr-Lee Alo	18	Lock	1	0	0	0	0	2024	1	0	0	0	0	Parramatta Eels
21	Chazmin Holloway-Samuels	—	Centre	0	0	0	0	0	—	0	0	0	0	0	Runaway Bay Seagulls
16	Elianna Walton	40	Prop	0	0	0	0	0	2022	2	0	0	0	0	Mounties
17	Wanita Leatherby	19	Second-row	0	0	0	0	0	—	0	0	0	0	0	Manly Warringah Sea Eagles
–	Ngatokotoru Arakua	27	Prop	0	0	0	0	0	2023	1	0	0	0	0	Gold Coast Titans

Notes:

- Five members of the squad have previously played for other nations.
  - New Zealand (4): Arakua (9 matches), Poko (2), Takairangi (2), and Tamarua (5).
  - Australia Samoa: Elianna Walton played for Australia (11 matches, 2009-2018), Samoa (1 match, 2019), NSW (7), the NRL All Stars, NSW City and the Prime Minister’s XIII. Takairangi also played for NSW City (3 matches).
- Four squad members have played for the Māori All Stars: Birch (1), Matua (3), Takairangi (1), Tamarua (1).
- Three members played in the 2024 NRLW season and a further seven have NRLW experience from previous seasons.
- Four members were selected from New Zealand clubs: Charntay Poko (Papanui Tigers), Jodeci Joseph (Papakura Sea Eagles), Kaiyah Atai and Lydia Turua-Quedley (both Richmond Roses).
- Seven members played in the 2024 NSWRL Women's Premiership: Lavinia Kitai (Cronulla Sharks), Kiana Takairangi (South Sydney Rabbitohs), Elianna Walton (Mounties), Ryvrr-Lee Alo, Chelsea Makira, and Tahleisha Maeva (all Parramatta Eels). Jazmon Tupou-Witchman played for South Sydney prior to a late season recruitment by the Cowboys.
- Wanita Leatherby played for Manly Sea Eagles Under 19 team in 2023, but did not play in the 2024 season.
- Five members played in the QRL Women's Premiership: Chantelle Holloway-Samuels (Tweed Heads Seagulls), Tyler Birch, Lavinia Kitai (both Burleigh Bears), Ngatokotoru Arakua, and Kiarah Siauane (both Souths Logan Magpies).
- Chazmin Holloway-Samuels and Crystal Tamarua both played for the Runaway Bay Seagulls in an A Grade competition.
- Anneka Stephens played for the Western Force in the 2024 Super Rugby Women's season and subsequently for the Joondalup Giants in the NRL Western Australia Women’s Competition.

=== Fiji ===
The Fiji Bulikula squad was announced on 8 October 2024.
Jersey numbers in the table reflect team selection for the Week 3 game against Fetu Samoa

J#	Player	Age	Position(s)	Tournament					Fiji Bulikula Career						2024 Club
J#	Player	Age	Position(s)	M	T	G	F	P	Dbt	M	T	G	F	P	2024 Club
1	Cassie Staples	32	Fullback	2	0	0	0	0	2023	3	0	0	0	0	Cronulla-Sutherland Sharks
4	Vitalina Naikore	24	Wing	2	3	3	0	18	2023	3	5	3	0	26	North Queensland Cowboys
3	Sienna Laing	19	Centre, Five-eighth	2	1	0	0	4	2023	3	1	0	0	4	Burleigh Bears
6	Taina Naividi	23	Centre, Wing	2	0	0	0	0	2024	2	0	0	0	0	Sydney Roosters
19	Abigayle Sekitoga	19	Wing, Centre	2	1	0	0	4	2024	2	1	0	0	4	Canterbury-Bankstown Bulldogs
17	Luisa Yaranamua	21	Five-eighth, Lock	2	0	0	0	0	2024	2	0	0	0	0	Cronulla-Sutherland Sharks
5	Losana Lutu	20	Halfback, Five-eighth	2	0	0	0	0	2024	2	0	0	0	0	Wests Tigers
8	Sereana Maragi	—	Prop	1	0	0	0	0	2024	1	0	0	0	0	Yasawa Saints
9	Sereana Naitokatoka	23	Hooker, Halfback	2	0	0	0	0	2019	4	0	4	0	8	Canberra Raiders
2	Ilisapeci Bari	19	Prop	2	0	0	0	0	2024	2	0	0	0	0	Canterbury-Bankstown Bulldogs
11	Nanise Vakacavu	21	Second-row	2	0	0	0	0	2024	2	0	0	0	0	Canterbury-Bankstown Bulldogs
12	Latisha Smythe	19	Second-row, Lock	2	0	0	0	0	2024	2	0	0	0	0	Canterbury-Bankstown Bulldogs
18	Talei Holmes	24	Lock, Second-row	2	1	0	0	4	2019	4	1	0	0	4	Cronulla-Sutherland Sharks
14	Anastasia Shum	23	Second-row	2	0	0	0	0	2023	3	0	0	0	0	South Sydney Rabbitohs
20	Mere Kilawekana	—	Prop	2	0	0	0	0	2023	3	0	0	0	0	USP Raiders
21	Rory Muller	19	Hooker	1	0	0	0	0	2024	1	0	0	0	0	Parramatta Eels
25	Teaghan Hartigan	29	Hooker	2	0	0	0	0	2019	3	0	0	0	0	Currumbin Eagles
10	Asenaca Diranuve	24	Fullback	0	0	0	0	0	—	0	0	0	0	0	Police Sharks
15	Ema Rainima	—	Second-row	1	0	0	0	0	2023	2	0	0	0	0	South Sydney Rabbitohs
23	Rusila Camaibure	—	Second-row	0	0	0	0	0	—	0	0	0	0	0	Victoria
24	Ateca Naicaucauceva	—	—	0	0	0	0	0	—	0	0	0	0	0	Police Sharks
–	Aliti Namoce	27	Prop	1	0	0	0	0	2023	2	1	0	0	4	Parramatta Eels

Notes:

- Five members of the squad have played in other representative matches.
  - Fiji Prime Ministers XIII (1): Naitokatoka (1 match).
  - NSW City (4): Holmes (2), Naividi (2), Namoce (3), Staples (1).
- Six members of the squad have NRLW experience. In addition, Sienna Laing was a development player with the Gold Coast Titans in 2023 and promoted to a full contract in 2024, but did not play due to injury.
- Four members were selected from Fiji clubs: Police Sharks (2), USP Raiders and Yasawa Saints.
- Nine members were selected from NSWRL teams: Canterbury Bulldogs (4), South Sydney Rabbitohs (2), Cronulla Sharks (1), and Parramatta Eels (2).
- One member, Teaghan Hartigan, was selected from the Currumbin Eagles.
- Six squad members played in the 2024 Australasian National Championships: Rusila Camaibure for Victoria; Taina Naividi for NSW City; Abigayle Sekitoga and Nanise Vakacavu for the Northern Territory; and Asenaca Diranuve and Mere Kilawekana for the Fiji team.

=== Samoa ===
The Fetu Samoa squad was announced on 9 October 2024.
Jersey numbers in the table reflect team selection for the Week 4 Game against PNG Orchids.

J#	Player	Age	Position(s)	Tournament					Fetu Samoa Career						2024 Club
J#	Player	Age	Position(s)	M	T	G	F	P	Dbt	M	T	G	F	P	2024 Club
1	Cassie Staples	32	Fullback	2	0	0	0	0	2023	3	0	0	0	0	Cronulla-Sutherland Sharks
4	Vitalina Naikore	24	Wing	2	3	3	0	18	2023	3	5	3	0	26	North Queensland Cowboys
3	Sienna Laing	19	Centre, Five-eighth	2	1	0	0	4	2023	3	1	0	0	4	Burleigh Bears
6	Taina Naividi	23	Centre, Wing	2	0	0	0	0	2024	2	0	0	0	0	Sydney Roosters
19	Abigayle Sekitoga	19	Wing, Centre	2	1	0	0	4	2024	2	1	0	0	4	Canterbury-Bankstown Bulldogs
17	Luisa Yaranamua	21	Five-eighth, Lock	2	0	0	0	0	2024	2	0	0	0	0	Cronulla-Sutherland Sharks
5	Losana Lutu	20	Halfback, Five-eighth	2	0	0	0	0	2024	2	0	0	0	0	Wests Tigers
8	Sereana Maragi	—	Prop	1	0	0	0	0	2024	1	0	0	0	0	Yasawa Saints
9	Sereana Naitokatoka	23	Hooker, Halfback	2	0	0	0	0	2019	4	0	4	0	8	Canberra Raiders
2	Ilisapeci Bari	19	Prop	2	0	0	0	0	2024	2	0	0	0	0	Canterbury-Bankstown Bulldogs
11	Nanise Vakacavu	21	Second-row	2	0	0	0	0	2024	2	0	0	0	0	Canterbury-Bankstown Bulldogs
12	Latisha Smythe	19	Second-row, Lock	2	0	0	0	0	2024	2	0	0	0	0	Canterbury-Bankstown Bulldogs
18	Talei Holmes	24	Lock, Second-row	2	1	0	0	4	2019	4	1	0	0	4	Cronulla-Sutherland Sharks
14	Anastasia Shum	23	Second-row	2	0	0	0	0	2023	3	0	0	0	0	South Sydney Rabbitohs
20	Mere Kilawekana	—	Prop	2	0	0	0	0	2023	3	0	0	0	0	USP Raiders
21	Rory Muller	19	Hooker	1	0	0	0	0	2024	1	0	0	0	0	Parramatta Eels
25	Teaghan Hartigan	29	Hooker	2	0	0	0	0	2019	3	0	0	0	0	Currumbin Eagles
10	Asenaca Diranuve	24	Fullback	0	0	0	0	0	—	0	0	0	0	0	Police Sharks
15	Ema Rainima	—	Second-row	1	0	0	0	0	2023	2	0	0	0	0	South Sydney Rabbitohs
23	Rusila Camaibure	—	Second-row	0	0	0	0	0	—	0	0	0	0	0	Victoria
24	Ateca Naicaucauceva	—	—	0	0	0	0	0	—	0	0	0	0	0	Police Sharks
–	Aliti Namoce	27	Prop	1	0	0	0	0	2023	2	1	0	0	4	Parramatta Eels

Three members of the squad have previously played for another nation:

  - Australia (1): Pelite (4 matches)
  - New Zealand (2): Fogavini (3), Nu'uausala (14)

Eight squad members have previously played for Australasian based representative teams:

  - Māori All Stars (2): Brill (2), Clarke (1)
  - Prime Minister’s XIII (3): Clarke (1), Pio (2), Soliola (1)
  - Queensland (3): Brill (6), Lofipo (1), Pelite (6)
  - NSW (1): Stowers (1)
  - NSW City (Sydney) (3): Pio (3), Soliola (1), Stowers (3)
  - NSW Country (1): Tinao (1)
  - NRL All Stars (1): Karpani (1)
- 18 squad members played in the 2024 NRLW season. Another, Stowers, has previous NRLW experience.
- Stowers and Eli played for Manly-Warringah Sea Eagles in the 2024 NSWRL Women's Premiership.
- Mercedez Taulelei-Siala played for Tweed Heads Seagulls in the 2024 QRL Women's Premiership and the 2023 and 2024 QRL Under 19 competitions.

=== Tonga ===
The Tonga squad was announced on 8 October 2024.
Jersey numbers in the table reflect team selection for the Week 1 Game against Samoa

J#	Player	Age	Position(s)	Tournament					Mata Ma'a Tonga Career						2024 Club
J#	Player	Age	Position(s)	M	T	G	F	P	Dbt	M	T	G	F	P	2024 Club
1	Anaseini Malupo	18	Fullback, Centre	1	0	0	0	0	2024	1	0	0	0	0	Townsville Blackhawks
2	Maatuleio Fotu-Moala	26	Wing, Centre	1	0	0	0	0	2020	3	0	0	0	0	St George Illawarra Dragons
3	Litia Fusi	20	Centre	1	0	0	0	0	2023	2	0	0	0	0	Canterbury-Bankstown Bulldogs
4	Kate Fallon	21	Centre	1	0	0	0	0	2024	1	0	0	0	0	Parramatta Eels
5	Lavinia Tauhalaliku	25	Wing	1	1	0	0	4	2022	3	1	0	0	4	North Queensland Cowboys
6	Emmanita Paki	22	Five-eighth, Centre	1	0	2	0	4	2024	1	0	2	0	4	Central Queensland Capras
7	Cassey Tohi-Hiku	21	Halfback	1	0	0	0	0	2023	2	0	1	0	2	Parramatta Eels
8	Kalosipani Hopoate	20	Prop	1	0	0	0	0	2022	2	0	0	0	0	Sydney Roosters
9	Jade Fonua	—	Lock	1	0	0	0	0	2023	2	0	0	0	0	Parramatta Eels
10	Tegan Dymock	22	Prop	1	0	0	0	0	2022	3	0	0	0	0	Cronulla-Sutherland Sharks
11	Manilita Takapautolo	18	Second-row, Prop	1	1	0	0	4	2024	1	1	0	0	4	Cronulla-Sutherland Sharks
12	Vanessa Foliaki	31	Second-row	1	0	0	0	0	2023	2	0	0	0	0	Cronulla-Sutherland Sharks
13	Natasha Penitani	25	Lock, Prop	1	0	0	0	0	2022	3	0	0	0	0	Wests Tigers
15	Filomina Hanisi	23	Prop	1	1	0	0	4	2024	1	1	0	0	4	Cronulla-Sutherland Sharks
16	Dannii Perese	20	Lock	1	0	0	0	0	2023	2	0	0	0	0	Gold Coast Titans
17	Paea Uilou	18	Prop	1	0	0	0	0	2024	1	0	0	0	0	Canterbury-Bankstown Bulldogs
19	Seli Mailangi	27	Hooker	1	0	0	0	0	2022	3	0	0	0	0	Cronulla-Sutherland Sharks
14	Tatiana Finau	21	Second-row	0	0	0	0	0	—	0	0	0	0	0	Canberra Raiders
18	Shannon Muru	—	Second-row	0	0	0	0	0	2022	2	0	0	0	0	Canterbury-Bankstown Bulldogs
20	Metanoia Fotu-Moala	26	Wing, Centre	0	0	0	0	0	2020	1	0	0	0	0	Richmond Roses
21	Claudia Finau	18	Prop	0	0	0	0	0	—	0	0	0	0	0	Canberra Raiders

Notes:

- Six members of the squad were selected from outside the 2024 NRLW clubs, as indicated by the shading in the Clubs column of the above table: Richmond Roses in New Zealand (Metanoia Fotu-Moala), the Central Queensland Capras (Paki) and from the NSWRL HNWP — Canterbury Bulldogs (Fusi, Muru & Uilou) and Cronulla Sharks (Mailangi).
- Six squad members have played other representative matches.
  - Australia Vanessa Foliaki (6 matches), who has played for NSW (6), All Stars (1), City (1), and the Prime Minister's XIII (1).
  - Queensland (1): Paki (2)
  - NSW (2): Hanisi (2), Foliaki (6)
  - NSW City (4): Foliaki (1), Hanisi (3), Hopoate (1), Tohi-Hiku (1)
  - Prime Minister's XIII (3): Foliaki (1), Perese (1), Tohi-Hiku (1).

== Wheelchair ==
=== Australia ===
The Australian squad was announced on 8 October 2024.

J#	Player	2024 Matches					2021 World Cup					State
J#	Player	M	T	G	F	P	M	T	G	F	P	State
7	Daniel Anstey	2	10	1	0	42	0	0	0	0	0	Queensland
1	Peter Arbuckle	2	1	0	0	4	4	2	0	0	8	Queensland
6	Cory Cannane	2	5	0	0	20	3	1	0	0	4	NSW
2	Brad Grove	2	5	0	0	20	4	6	0	0	24	NSW
12	Diab Karim	2	2	3	0	14	4	6	8	0	40	NSW
5	Bayley McKenna	2	9	16	0	68	4	3	18	0	48	Queensland
9	Toby Popple	2	2	1	0	10	0	0	0	0	0	NSW
10	Zac Schumaker	2	4	7	0	30	4	0	0	0	0	Queensland

=== New Zealand ===
The squad was announced on 31 October 2024.

J#	Player	2024 Matches
J#	Player	M	T	G	F	P
1	Ryan Charles	2	1	0	0	4
2	Nikia Fa’atau	1	0	0	0	0
3	Robert Graham	1	0	0	0	0
4	Jayson Hooker	2	0	0	0	0
5	Charles Joyce	1	0	0	0	0
6	Kauri Murray	2	0	0	0	0
7	Dan Scott	1	0	0	0	0
11	Jamie Tapp	2	2	0	0	8
12	Steven Hei	0	0	0	0	0
10	Slade St John	1	0	0	0	0
9	Lance Pakura	1	0	0	0	0
8	Yann Roux	1	0	0	0	0

== Key to acronyms ==
The following acronyms and abbreviations are used in the above tables:

- J# — Jersey Number
- Tournament - Appearance and scoring tallies within the 2024 Championships. Will be blank until matches are played.
  - M — Matches
  - T — Tries
  - G — Goals
  - F — Field Goals (also known as Drop goals)
  - P — Points
- International Career basic statistics appear under the team moniker - e.g. Kiwi Ferns Career for the New Zealand women's team.
  - Dbt — Debut Year. Where a player has played for two or more nations. the year displayed reflects the first appearance foe their current team.
- Club Competitions
  - 2024 Club
  - Where a player's 2024 club is outside the Super League, NRL or NRLW it is shaded in the table.
  - Matches - Tally of games played in club competitions
    - T1 — Tier 1 club competitions.
      - For men: Super League and National Rugby League
      - For women: National Rugby League Women's Premiership. This is the tier 1 competition for women in Australia. No players have been selected from the RFL Women's Super League in England.
    - T2 — Tier 2 club competitions.
      - For men: RFL Championship in England and France; and the Queensland Cup and NSW Cup in Australasia.
      - For women: Matches played between 2021 and 2024 in the NSWRL Women's Premiership and or QRL Women's Premiership. have also included matches playe din the semi-professional women's club competition in Papua New Guinea that was introduced in 2024.
- Other Representative Matches — An icon and number of matches is used.
