= Tugun Seahawks =

Australian rugby league club, based in Gold Coast QLD

Club information
- Full name: Tugun-Coolangatta Seahawks RLFC
- Colours: Blue; White
- Founded: 1978; 48 years ago

Current details
- Ground: Betty Diamond Complex, Coolangatta
- Competition: Northern Rivers Regional Rugby League; Gold Coast Rugby League

Records
- Premierships: 5 (2007, 2013, 2016, 2024, 2025)

The Tugun Seahawks are a rugby league club based in the Gold Coast suburb of Tugun. Their home ground (Betty Diamond Complex) is adjacent to Gold Coast Airport and their colours are Blue & White.

The Seahawks' first season in the Gold Coast Rugby League competition was in 1978 and they made the 1st grade grand final in their inaugural season but lost the game to Nerang Roosters 26-5. They tasted their first 1st grade title in 1985 when Tugun accounted for Beaudesert 31-10.

It took another 19 years for the Seahawks claim a second 1st grade title. After finishing runners up in both 2002 & 2003, Tugun enjoyed success in 2004 by downing Tweed Heads 39-10 in the Gold Coast -Group 18 Grand Final. The competition disbanded at the end of this year and the Seahawks joined the Mixwell Cup and the Gold Coast competition in 2005.

Tugun enjoyed considerable success in the Mixwell A Grade Cup finishing 6th out of 11 teams but often struggled to field teams in Colts and finished second last.

== Notable Juniors ==
Notable First Grade Players that have played at Tugun Seahawks include:

- Ben Ikin (1995-04 Gold Coast, North Sydney & Brisbane)
- Scott Anderson (2007-16 Melbourne Storm, Brisbane & Wakefield)
- Kevin Proctor (2008- Melbourne Storm & Gold Coast Titans)
- Jordan Rapana (2008- Gold Coast Titans & Canberra)
- Justin Hunt (2012-16 South Sydney, Parramatta, St George Illawarra & Wests)
- Ryan Simpkins (2012-18 Penrith & Gold Coast Titans)
- Jahrome Hughes (2013- Gold Coast Titans, North Queensland & Melbourne Storm)
- Kane Elgey (2015- Gold Coast Titans & Manly)
- Tazmin Gray (2018- Sydney Roosters, Brisbane Broncos & New Zealand Warriors)

== See also ==
- List of rugby league clubs in Australia
