= Kevin Proctor =

New Zealand international rugby league footballer

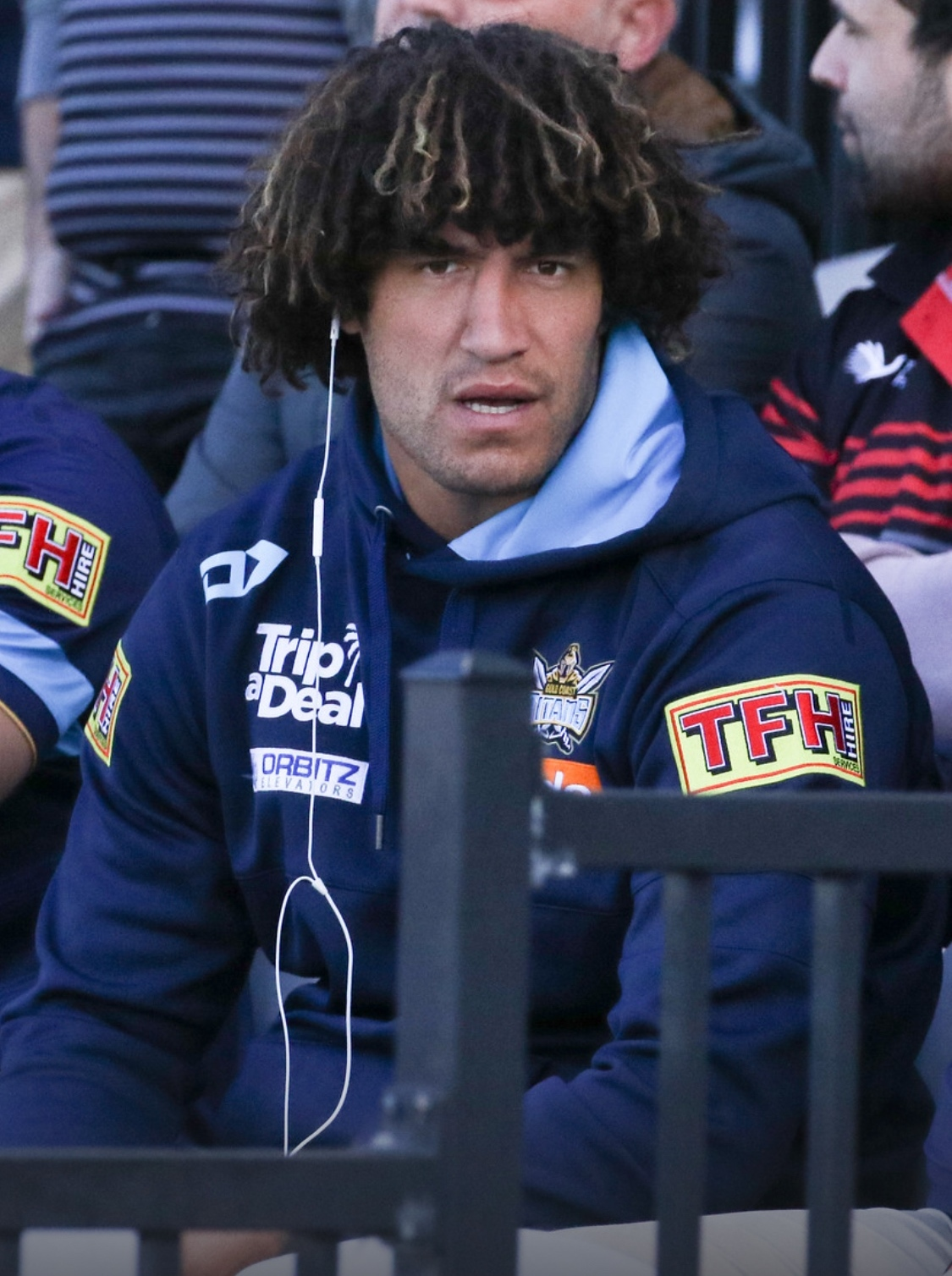

Personal information
- Born: 28 February 1989 (age 37) Te Kūiti, Waikato, New Zealand
- Height: 189 cm (6 ft 2 in)
- Weight: 107 kg (16 st 12 lb)

Playing information
- Position: Second-row
Club
Years	Team	Pld	T	G	FG	P
2008–16	Melbourne Storm	179	28	0	0	112
2017–22	Gold Coast Titans	104	18	1	0	74
2023	Wakefield Trinity	21	1	0	0	4
2024	AS Carcassonne	6	0	0	0	0
	Total	310	47	1	0	190
Representative
Years	Team	Pld	T	G	FG	P
2008	New Zealand Māori	1	0	0	0	0
2012–19	New Zealand	22	2	0	0	8
2019–20	Māori All Stars	2	0	0	0	0
- Source: As of 13 October 2023

Kevin Proctor (born 28 February 1989) is a New Zealand professional rugby league footballer who plays as a second-row forward for Currumbin Eagles in the Gold Coast Rugby League, and the New Zealand Māori and New Zealand at international level.

Proctor was a member of the Melbourne Storm squad in 2012, with whom he won the 2012 NRL Grand Final.

== Early life ==
Proctor was born in Te Kūiti, New Zealand. He is of the Maori iwi (tribe) Ngā Puhi and also of Scottish descent. Proctor moved with his parents to Perth, Western Australia where he took up Australian rules football before they moved again to the Gold Coast, Australia as a 12-year-old where he attended Palm Beach Currumbin High School.

He played his junior rugby league for the Currumbin Eagles and represented 2006 Australian Schoolboys and the 2007 Junior Kiwis before playing for the Melbourne Storm NYC team in 2008.

== NRL career ==
=== 2008 ===
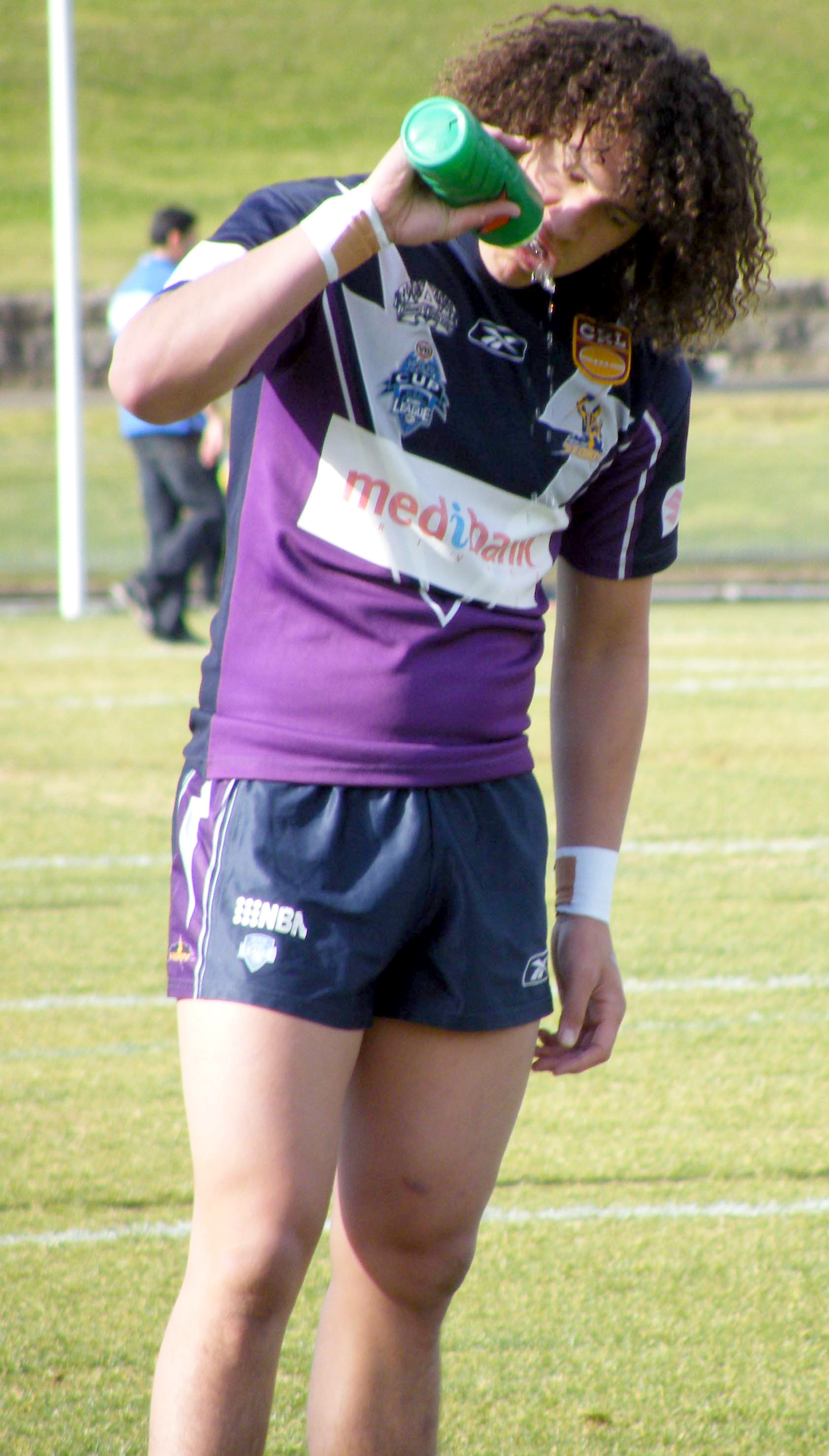
Proctor playing for the Melbourne Storm in 2008

In Round 10 of the 2008 NRL season, Proctor made his NRL debut for the Melbourne Storm against the St George Illawarra Dragons playing off the interchange bench in the Storms 36–12 loss at ANZ Stadium. He played in 3 matches, filling in on the interchange bench in the State of Origin period.

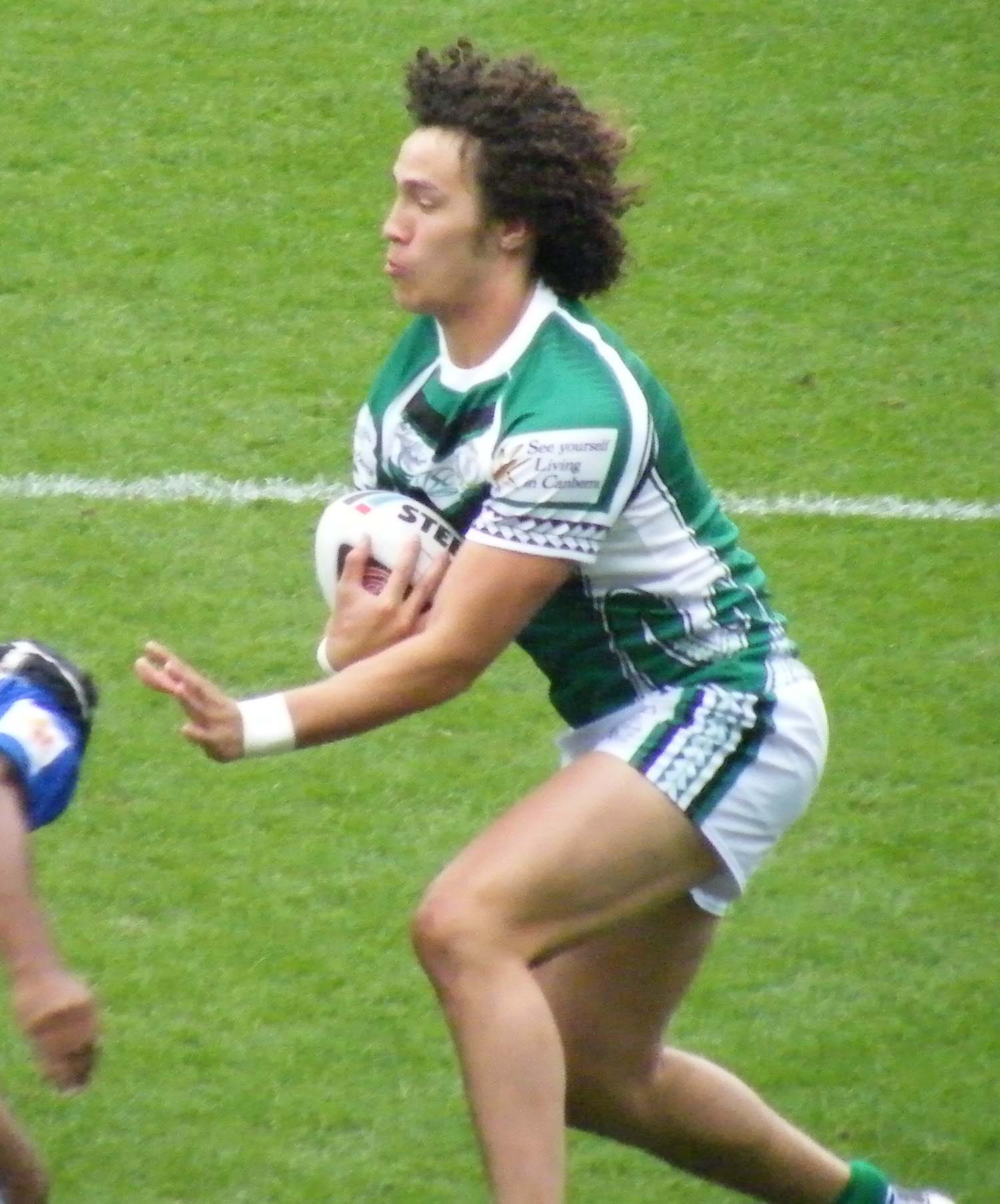
Proctor playing for the New Zealand Māori in 2008

Proctor played in the World Cup curtain opener match for the New Zealand Māori rugby league team against the Indigenous Dreamtime team in the Māori's 34–26 loss at SFS.

=== 2009 ===
Proctor scored his first NRL career try in Round 2 against the Brisbane Broncos in the Storms 16–14 loss at Suncorp Stadium. In Round 7, Proctor suffered an ankle injury and didn't play first grade for the Storm for the rest of the year, playing in the NYC. On 15 June 2009, Proctor extended his contract with the Melbourne Storm to the end of the 2011 season. Proctor played in the Storm's NYC Grand Final team against the Wests Tigers playing off the interchange bench in the 24–22 win. Proctor played in 7 matches for the Storm in 2009 and was named the club's Rookie of the Year.

=== 2010 ===
Proctor played off the interchange bench the Storm's 2010 World Club Challenge 18–14 win over Leeds Rhinos. He finished the club's drama filled season with 22 appearances. Proctor played for the Māori team against England off the interchange bench in the 18–18 draw.

=== 2011 ===
In April, Proctor signed an extension to take him through until the end of the 2014 season. He played in all of the Storm's 26 matches, scoring 4 tries. Proctor toured with the New Zealand national rugby league team squad during the 2011 Four Nations tournament but didn't play a match.

=== 2012 ===
Proctor played in Storm's 2012 NRL Grand Final victory over the Canterbury-Bankstown Bulldogs playing at second-row in the 14–4 win. He scored 6 tries from 23 matches for the Storm. Proctor was selected to make his international debut for New Zealand in the October test at 1300SMILES Stadium, starting at second-row in the 20–12 loss against Australia.

=== 2013 ===
For the Anzac Test, Proctor again represented the Kiwis in their 32–12 loss to Australia. In Round 24 in the Storm's smashing 64–4 win over the Parramatta Eels, he played in 100th career NRL match. Proctor finished the year with 23 matches and 3 tries for the Storm. He was selected the Kiwis World Cup train-on squad but did not make the final 24-man squad.

=== 2014 ===
In February, Proctor was included in the Storm's inaugural Nines squad. He played for New Zealand in the 2014 Anzac Test in the Kiwis 30–18 loss. On 27 May, Proctor re-signed with the Storm, keeping him at the club till the end of the 2018 season. He finished the season playing in all of the Storm's 25 matches and scoring 5 tries. Proctor was selected in the Kiwis squad for the Four Nations series. He scored his first international try in the Kiwis 30–12 win over Australia at Suncorp Stadium, and went on to play in the victory over Australia in the final.

=== 2015 ===
On 3 May 2015, Proctor was selected to play for the New Zealand Kiwis against Australia in the 2015 Anzac Test, playing at second-row in the Kiwis 26-12 win at Suncorp Stadium. In Round 23 against the Cronulla-Sutherland Sharks, Proctor played his 150th NRL career match in the Storms' 30-2 win at Remondis Stadium. Proctor finished the 2015 NRL season with him playing in all of the Storms' 26 matches and scoring 3 tries. On 8 October 2015, Proctor was selected in the 23-man New Zealand squad to tour England. Proctor played in all 3 matches against England in the Kiwis 2-1 Baskerville Shield series loss.

=== 2016 ===
On 6 May, Proctor played for the Kiwis against Australia, starting at second-row in the 16-0 loss. In the 2016 NRL Grand Final against the Cronulla-Sutherland Sharks, Proctor started at second-row in the Storm's 14-12 loss. He finished the season with 24 appearances and 6 tries. Selected for the Kiwis Four Nations side, he played in 4 matches and scored 1 try in the tournament, including in the Kiwis 34-8 Final loss against Australia.

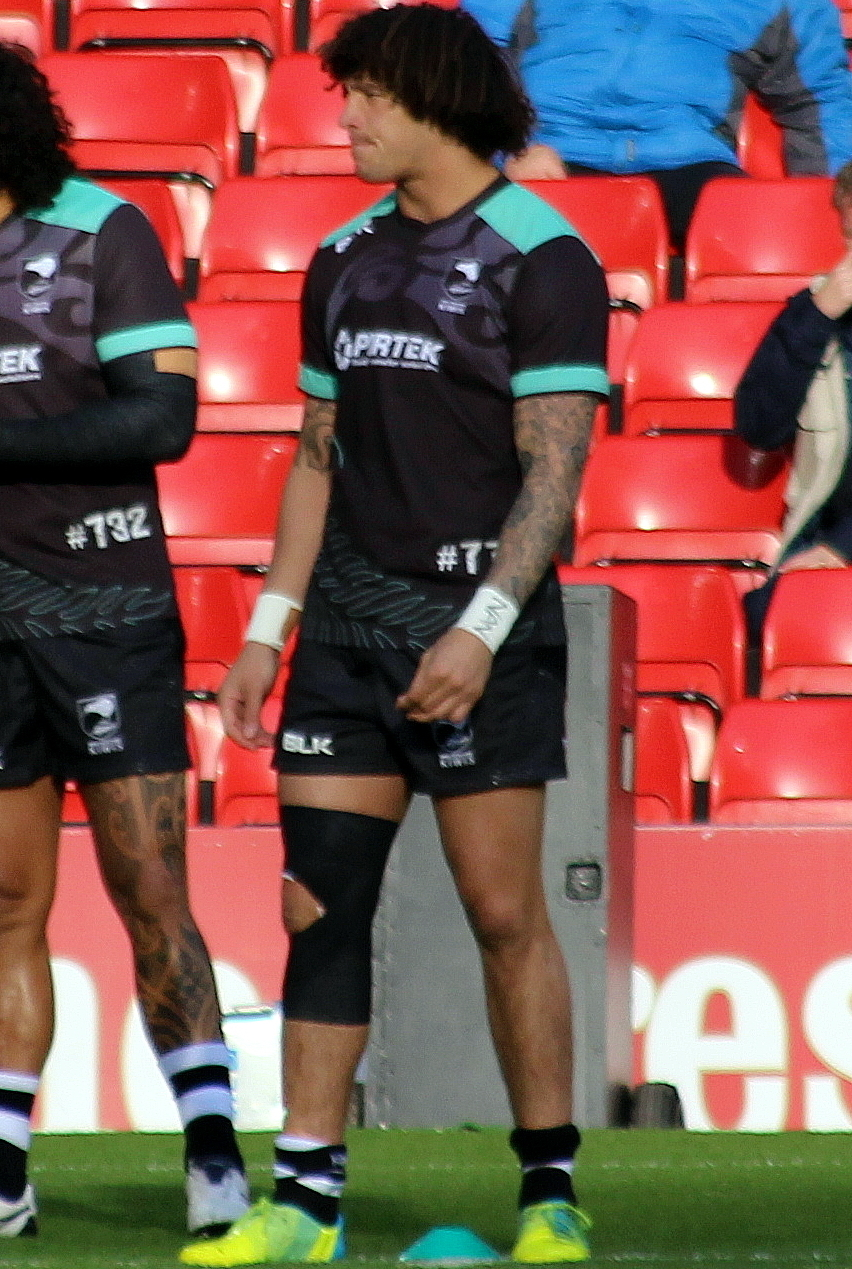
Proctor warming up with the Kiwis ahead of the Four Nations Final at Anfield in 2016

On 2 November, Proctor was released from his contract with the Storm and signed a 4-year deal with the Gold Coast Titans starting in 2017, an ideal signing for the club after losing senior forwards Greg Bird and Luke Douglas to the Super League and the retirement of hooker Nathan Friend. Proctor commented about the signing, "This is a great opportunity to return home to the Gold Coast with my young family to be closer to all of our family. It has been a long process and I needed to feel comfortable with the decision as I have had a successful time at the Melbourne Storm and made some great friends but now I am looking forward to joining Neil and the Titans players and contributing to the team's success."

=== 2017 ===
Proctor and Ryan James were announced as the Titans co-captains for the 2017 season. In Round 1, Proctor made his debut for Titans against the Sydney Roosters, where he started at second-row in the 32-18 loss at Cbus Super Stadium. After the Anzac Test, Proctor and Kiwis team mate Jesse Bromwich were caught on a police CCTV camera, showing the two consuming cocaine. Proctor was suspended and stripped off his Gold Coast Titans captaincy, and missed out on the Rugby League World Cup near the end of 2017. Proctor did attempt to switch to play for Scotland during the 2017 Rugby League World Cup but officials from the Scotland Rugby League checked it was his great grandparent's heritage ruling him ineligible.

=== 2018 ===
In round 5 of the 2018 NRL season, Proctor play his 200th NRL game in the 32-20 win over the Manly Warringah Sea Eagles at Marley Brown Oval.

=== 2019 ===
Proctor started the 2019 NRL season as one of the Gold Coast's first choice second-rowers as the club lost their first 4 games. On 25 July, he was named one of the club's co-captains. Following their round 20, 58-6 loss to the Sydney Roosters, Proctor wrote an apology letter to the club's fans which said "As a playing group, we were humiliated, embarrassed and appalled at the result and the way that we played as a team, I don't have any explanation for why the game panned out the way it did, It has been a hard year, and you deserve better than the results we have delivered, and we're sorry. We will not give up. We hope that you will not give up on us".

Proctor made a total of 22 appearances for the Gold Coast as the club endured a horror year on and off the field. During the halfway mark of the season, head coach Garth Brennan was sacked by the club after a string of poor results. The Gold Coast managed to win only 4 games for the entire season, claiming the wooden spoon.

=== 2020 ===
In round 14 of the 2020 NRL season, Proctor played his 250th first grade game against Cronulla-Sutherland at Kogarah Oval. In the same match, Proctor was sent off after allegedly biting Cronulla player Shaun Johnson.

On 18 August, Proctor was found guilty of biting Johnson and suspended for four matches.

=== 2021 ===
Proctor played 23 games for the Gold Coast in the 2021 NRL season including the club's elimination final loss against the Sydney Roosters.

=== 2022 ===
On 25 July, Proctor was terminated by the Gold Coast club after he uploaded to Instagram a video of himself vaping during the half time interval at the Western Sydney Stadium. He was not playing in the club's round 19 match against Canterbury but was on the reserves list. Proctor was also fined $15,000 by the club. On 31 October 2022 it was confirmed that Proctor had signed for Wakefield Trinity on a one-year deal.

=== 2023 ===
Proctor made his club debut for Wakefield Trinity in round 1 of the 2023 Super League season against the Catalans Dragons which saw Wakefield lose 24-38. In round 11 against Warrington, Proctor was given a red card for a dangerous high tackle during Wakefield's 32-18 loss. Proctor played 20 matches for Wakefield Trinity in the Super League XXVIII season as the club finished bottom of the table and were relegated to the RFL Championship which ended their 24-year stay in the top flight.

On 13 October 2023, it was reported that he had signed for AS Carcassonne in the French Elite One Championship following the relegation of Wakefield Trinity from the Super League.

=== 2025 ===
On 10 January 2025 it was reported that he had signed for Currumbin Eagles in the Gold Coast Rugby League.

== Post NRL ==
In June 2025, Proctor made headlines after he was knocked out cold during a 'RUNIT' event held in Dubai.

== Statistics ==
Year	Team	Games	Tries	Goals	Pts
2008	Melbourne Storm	3			
2009	Melbourne Storm	7	1		4
2010	Melbourne Storm	22			
2011	Melbourne Storm	26	4		16
2012	Melbourne Storm	23	6		24
2013	Melbourne Storm	23	3		12
2014	Melbourne Storm	25	5		20
2015	Melbourne Storm	26	3		12
2016	Melbourne Storm	24	6		24
2017	Gold Coast Titans	16	3		12
2018	Gold Coast Titans	23	3	1	14
2019	Gold Coast Titans	22	2		8
2020	Gold Coast Titans	12	4		16
2021	Gold Coast Titans	23	6		24
2022	Gold Coast Titans	8			
2023	Wakefield Trinity	21	1		4
	Totals	331	47	1	190
