= Gold Coast Rugby League =

Australian rugby league football competition based in Gold Coast, Queensland

- Current season or competition: 2026 Gold Coast Rugby League season
- Sport: Rugby league
- Formerly known as: Gold Coast-Group 18 (1989–2003)
- Instituted: 1983
- Number of teams: 18 (7 A-Grade-teams)
- Country: Gold Coast, Queensland, Australia
- Premiers: Tugun Seahawks (2026)
- Most titles: Southport Tigers (9 titles)
- Related competition: Queensland Cup

The Gold Coast Rugby League premiership (also known as the Kevin Bycroft Cup) is a rugby league football competition based in Gold Coast, Queensland, Australia. It is under the administration of the Queensland Rugby League through the South East Queensland Division, which also administers the competitions from Brisbane and Ipswich.

The Gold Coast Rugby League Premiership consists of ten clubs, competing in three senior leagues; A-Grade (Seniors), Reserves and Colts (under-19s). The Gold Coast Junior Rugby League was formed in 1976 and consists of seventeen clubs, competing in multiple age groups from under-7s to under-17s.

== Representative Gold Coast Rugby League team ==
Selected players from the Gold Coast Rugby League, represented Gold Coast in a representative team called Gold Coast Firsts or Gold Coast Vikings, whose teams also competed in the statewide competitions, the Cyril Connell Cup and the Mal Meninga Cup.

The Gold Coast Rugby League had previously entered sides in the Queensland Cup and in the Winfield State League as the Gold Coast Vikings. They participated in the Queensland Cup in 1998 only and in the Winfield State League from the first season (1982) to the last season (1995). Gold Coast also made one appearance in the Amco Cup.

== Premiership winners ==
Grand Final results compiled from scores published in the Rugby League Week.

Season	Grand Final Information				Minor Premiers
Season	Premiers	Score	Runners-up	Venue	Minor Premiers
1983	Beaudesert Kingfishers	23–6	Southport Tigers
1984	Beaudesert Kingfishers	20–2	Beenleigh Pride
1985	Tugun Seahawks	31–10	Beaudesert Kingfishers
1986	Southport Tigers	26–14	Tugun Seahawks		Beenleigh Pride
1987	Southport Tigers	20–10	Nerang Roosters		Beaudesert Kingfishers
1988	Southport Tigers	22–16	Beenleigh Pride
1989	Tweed Heads Seagulls	36–16	Southport Tigers		Tweed Heads Seagulls
1990	Beaudesert Kingfishers	20–18	Bilambil Jets		Beaudesert Kingfishers
1991	Beaudesert Kingfishers	32–18	Runaway Bay Seagulls		Runaway Bay Seagulls
1992	Bilambil Jets	24–0	Nerang Roosters		Bilambil Jets
1993	Bilambil Jets	26–4	Beaudesert Kingfishers		Beaudesert Kingfishers
1994	Tweed Heads Seagulls	27–26	Nerang Roosters		Nerang Roosters
1995	Burleigh Bears	26–6	South Tweed Koalas		Burleigh Bears
1996	South Tweed Koalas	16–10	Burleigh Bears		Burleigh Bears
1997	Runaway Bay Seagulls	18–17	Cudgen Hornets		Runaway Bay Seagulls
1998	Tweed Heads Seagulls	18–12	Southport Tigers
1999	Burleigh Bears	18–14	Tweed Heads Seagulls		Burleigh Bears
2000	Runaway Bay Seagulls	32–0	Burleigh Bears		Runaway Bay Seagulls
2001	Tweed Heads Seagulls	40–28	Runaway Bay Seagulls		Tweed Heads Seagulls
2002	Tweed Heads Seagulls	38–24	Tugun Seahawks		Tweed Heads Seagulls
2003	Mt Tamborine Bushrats	26–12	Mudgeeraba Mustangs		Murwillumbah Mustangs
2004	Beaudesert Kingfishers	22–4	Burleigh Bears		Parkwood Sharks
2005	Runaway Bay Seagulls	18–16	Parkwood Sharks		Parkwood Sharks
2006	Burleigh Bears	30–26	Tugun Seahawks		Tugun Seahawks
2007	Tugun Seahawks	36–6	Ormeau Shearers		Tugun Seahawks
2008	Southport Tigers	30–20	Currumbin Eagles		Southport Tigers
2009	Southport Tigers	12–6	Bilambil Jets		Southport Tigers
2010	Southport Tigers	18–6	Bilambil Jets		Southport Tigers
2011	Bilambil Jets	34–30	Tugun Seahawks		Burleigh Bears
2012	Burleigh Bears	13–12	Tugun Seahawks		Southport Tigers
2013	Tugun Seahawks	26–18	Southport Tigers		Southport Tigers
2014	Southport Tigers	24–18	Tugun Seahawks		Southport Tigers
2015	Burleigh Bears	36–24	Tugun Seahawks		Burleigh Bears
2016	Tugun Seahawks	27–14	Burleigh Bears		Tweed Heads Seagulls
2017	Burleigh Bears	20–12	Runaway Bay Seagulls		Burleigh Bears
2018	Runaway Bay Seagulls	36–10	Tweed Heads Seagulls		Currumbin Eagles
2019	Burleigh Bears	30–12	Southport Tigers		Burleigh Bears
2020	Runaway Bay Seagulls	22-14	Burleigh Bears	Cbus Super Stadium
2021	Burleigh Bears	26–6	Tugun Seahawks	Cbus Super Stadium
2022	Southport Tigers	40–0	Burleigh Bears	Cbus Super Stadium	Burleigh Bears
2023	Southport Tigers	36-6	Tugun Seahawks	UAA Park	Southport Tigers
2024	Tugun Seahawks	18-10	Currumbin Eagles	Betty Diamond Sports Complex	Burleigh Bears
2025	Tugun Seahawks	30-26	Burleigh Bears	Owen Park	Burleigh Bears
2026	Tugun Seahawks	15-14	Currumbin Eagles	Bycroft Oval	Burleigh Bears

== Gold Coast Rugby League Club Teams ==
The Gold Coast Rugby League Premiership currently has 18 clubs, for the senior and junior divisions.
All clubs are in the junior division but not all for the senior division.

Colours	Club	Nickname	Founded	Homeground	Suburb	Seniors	Juniors
	Beaudesert	Kingfishers	1962	R.S. Willis Park	Beaudesert	Yes	Yes
	Bilambil	Jets	1923	Bilambil Sports Complex	Bilambil	Yes	Yes
	Burleigh	Bears	1934	Pizzey Park	Miami	Yes	Yes
	Coolangatta	Knights	2014	Goodwin Park	Coolangatta	Yes	No
	Coomera	Cutters	2012	Coomera Sports Park	Coomera	No	Yes
	Cudgen	Hornets	1950	Ned Byrne Field	Kingscliff	Yes	Yes
	Currumbin	Eagles	1976	Merv Craig Sporting Complex	Currumbin Waters	Yes	Yes
	Helensvale	Hornets	1991	Robert Dalley Park	Helensvale	Yes	Yes
	Jimboomba	Thunder	2003	Jimboomba Park	Jimboomba	No	Yes
	Mount Tamborine	Bushrats	1992	Firth Park	Mount Tamborine	Yes	Yes
	Mudgeeraba	Redbacks	1992	Firth Park	Mudgeeraba	Yes	Yes
	Nerang	Roosters	1977	Glennon Park	Nerang	Yes	Yes
	Ormeau	Shearers	1999	Ormeau Oval	Ormeau	Yes	Yes
	Parkwood	Sharks	1976	Musgrave Sports Park	Southport	Yes	Yes
	Robina	Raptors	2005	Station Reserve	Robina	Yes	Yes
	Runaway Bay	Seagulls	1979	Bycroft Oval	Runaway Bay	Yes	Yes
	South Tweed	Koalas	2012	Dave Burns Field	South Tweed	Yes	Yes
	Southport	Tigers	1931	Owen Park	Southport	Yes	Yes
	Tugun	Seahawks	1978	Betty Diamond Complex	Tugun	Yes	Yes
	Tweed Coast	Raiders	1980	Les Burger Fields	Cabarita	Yes	Yes
	Tweed Heads	Seagulls	1908	Piggabeen Sports Complex	Tweed Heads	Yes	Yes

=== Senior Division ===
Colours	Club	Nickname	Founded	Homeground	Suburb
	Beaudesert	Kingfishers	1962	R.S. Willis Park	Beaudesert
	Bilambil	Jets	1923	Bilambil Sports Complex	Bilambil
	Burleigh	Bears	1934	Pizzey Park	Miami
	Coolangatta	Knights	2014	Goodwin Park	Coolangatta
	Cudgen	Hornets	1950	Ned Byrne Field	Kingscliff
	Currumbin	Eagles	1976	Merv Craig Sporting Complex	Currumbin Waters
	Helensvale	Hornets	1991	Robert Dalley Park	Helensvale
	Mount Tamborine	Bushrats	1992	Firth Park	Mount Tamborine
	Mudgeeraba	Redbacks	1992	Firth Park	Mudgeeraba
	Nerang	Roosters	1977	Glennon Park	Nerang
	Ormeau	Shearers	1999	Ormeau Oval	Ormeau
	Parkwood	Sharks	1976	Musgrave Sports Park	Southport
	Robina	Raptors	2005	Station Reserve	Robina
	Runaway Bay	Seagulls	1979	Bycroft Oval	Runaway Bay
	South Tweed	Koalas	2012	Les Burger Fields	South Tweed
	Southport	Tigers	1931	Owen Park	Southport
	Tugun	Seahawks	1978	Betty Diamond Complex	Tugun
	Tweed Coast	Raiders	1980	Les Burger Fields	Cabarita
	Tweed Heads	Seagulls	1908	Piggabeen Sports Complex	Tweed Heads

=== Junior Division ===
Colours	Club	Nickname	Founded	Homeground	Suburb
	Beaudesert	Kingfishers	1962	R.S. Willis Park	Beaudesert
	Bilambil	Jets	1923	Bilambil Sports Complex	Bilambil
	Burleigh	Bears	1934	Pizzey Park	Miami
	Coomera	Cutters	2012	Coomera Sports Park	Coomera
	Cudgen	Hornets	1950	Ned Byrne Field	Kingscliff
	Currumbin	Eagles	1976	Merv Craig Sporting Complex	Currumbin Waters
	Helensvale	Hornets	1991	Robert Dalley Park	Helensvale
	Jimboomba	Thunder	2003	Jimboomba Park	Jimboomba
	Mount Tamborine	Bushrats	1992	Firth Park	Mount Tamborine
	Mudgeeraba	Redbacks	1992	Firth Park	Mudgeeraba
	Nerang	Roosters	1977	Glennon Park	Nerang
	Ormeau	Shearers	1999	Ormeau Oval	Ormeau
	Parkwood	Sharks	1976	Musgrave Sports Park	Parkwood
	Robina	Raptors	2005	Station Reserve	Robina
	Runaway Bay	Seagulls	1979	Bycroft Oval	Runaway Bay
	South Tweed	Koalas	2012	Les Burger Fields	South Tweed
	Southport	Tigers	1931	Owen Park	Southport
	Tugun	Seahawks	1978	Betty Diamond Complex	Tugun
	Tweed Coast	Raiders	1980	Les Burger Fields	Cabarita
	Tweed Heads	Seagulls	1908	Piggabeen Sports Complex	Tweed Heads

== See also ==
- Rugby League Competitions in Australia
