= Jimboomba Thunder =

Club information
- Full name: Jimboomba Junior Rugby League Football Club
- Nickname: Thunder
- Colours: Green; Gold
- Founded: 2004

Current details
- Ground: Jimboomba Park “The Thunderdome”Jimboomba, Queensland
- Competition: Gold Coast Rugby League

Records
- Premierships: 1 - 2017 BSDRL men's open 3 (1)

The Jimboomba Thunder were formed in 2004 and currently field male and female teams in all junior grades of the Gold Coast Rugby League. The club is based at Jimboomba Park, Jimboomba, Queensland and the Gold Coast Titans Ambassadors are Luke Bailey, Beau Falloon and Cody Nelson.

== See also ==
- List of rugby league clubs in Australia
