= Runaway Bay Seagulls =

Australian rugby league club

Club information
- Full name: Runaway Bay Seagulls RLFC
- Colours: Navy Blue; White; Red
- Founded: 1979; 46 years ago

Current details
- Ground(s): Bycroft Oval
- Competition: Gold Coast Rugby League

Records
- Premierships: 4 (1997, 2000, 2018, 2020)

The Runaway Bay Seagulls is a rugby league club based on the northern end of the Gold Coast, Queensland, Australia. They play out of Bycroft Oval and their colours are Navy Blue, Red & White.

The Seagulls' first season in the Gold Coast Rugby League competition was in 1979 but did not win their first 1st grade title until 1997 when they defeated Cudgen 18–17 in the Gold Coast – Group 18 competition. They won again in 2000 by easily accounting for Burleigh 32–0.

In season 2018 Bay defeated Tweed Heads 36–10 and in 2020 CBus Super Stadium Robina was host to Runaway Bay 22 def Burleigh 14 Grand Final. Runaway Bay Seagulls were crowned Undefeated Minor and Major Premiers 2020.

Runaway Bay joined the Mixwell Cup in 2003 but have struggled to compete in both A Grade and Colts sometimes forfeiting matches due to lack of players. It was expected they would pull out of the competition in 2006 and concentrate their efforts fully on the Gold Coast Rugby League.

== Notable juniors ==
Notable First Grade Players that have played at Runaway Bay Seagulls include:

- Ian Turner
- Peter Jackson (1987–93 Canberra Raiders, Brisbane Broncos, and North Sydney Bears)
- Brett Horsnell (1989–98 Gold Coast Chargers, South Queensland Crushers, and Parramatta Eels)
- Eddie Fallins (1990–95 Gold Coast Seagulls)
- Scott Sattler (1992–04 Gold Coast Chargers, Eastern Suburbs Roosters, South Queensland Crushers, Penrith Panthers, and West Tigers)
- Nathan Antonik (1996–97 South Queensland Crushers)
- Jeremy Smith (2004– Melbourne Storm, St George, Cronulla, and Newcastle)
- Tim Smith (2005– Parramatta Eels, Wigan, Cronulla, Wakefield Trinity, and Salford)
- Jace Van Dijk (2006–09 Celtic Crusaders)
- Jarrod Wallace (2012– Brisbane Broncos, Gold Coast Titans and Dolphins)
- Brendan Elliot (2014–23 Sydney Roosters, Newcastle Knights, Gold Coast Titans, Manly Sea Eagles, and Leigh Centurions)
- Jesse Arthars (2019– Gold Coast Titans and Brisbane Broncos)
- Tanah Boyd (2019– Gold Coast Titans and New Zealand Warriors)
- Jayden Berrell (2022– Cronulla Sharks)
- Jahream Bula (2023– West Tigers)
- Blake Mozer (2023 Brisbane Broncos)
- Jye Gray (2024– South Sydney Rabbitohs)

== Sponsors ==
The Seagulls' sponsors have included Queensland Rugby League chief Ben Ikin.

== See also ==
- List of rugby league clubs in Australia
