= Southport Tigers =

Australian rugby league football club

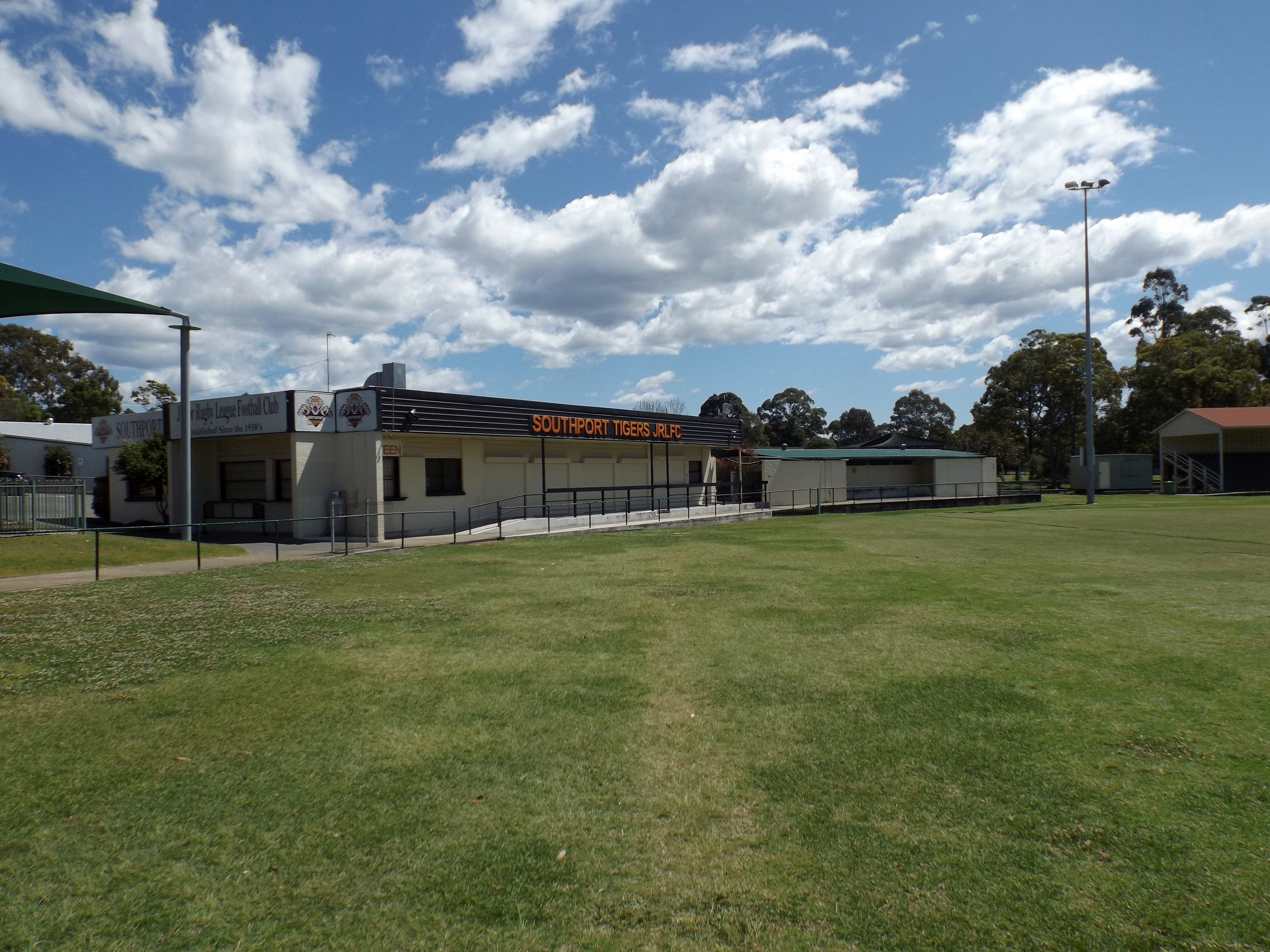

Club information
- Full name: Southport Rugby League Football Club
- Nickname: Tigers
- Colours: Gold/Orange; Black; White
- Founded: 1931

Current details
- Ground: Owen Park, Southport
- Competition: Gold Coast Rugby League

Records
- Premierships: 17 (1931, 1939, 1968, 1972, 1976, 1977, 1980, 1981, 1986, 1987, 1988, 2008, 2009, 2010, 2014, 2022, 2023)

Initially formed as the Southport Football Club the Southport Tigers compete in both the junior and senior Gold Coast Rugby League competitions. The club is based at Owen Park in Southport, Queensland, Australia.

== History ==
There has been a long history of Southport being represented in Rugby league dating back to the 1930s. They were then known as the Southport Wanderers. In 1931, the Southport Wanderers were the A Grade undefeated Premiers winning the Plunket Cup in that year. The Southport Wanderers Football Club A Grade side were the South Coast League Premiers and winners of the Mathias Cup in 1939. Southport also played local competition in the late forties and early fifties. The Southport Wanderers also had south coast representative teams in the Brisbane Rugby League Premiership competition.

In the late fifties the team was revived as the All Whites. The team was resurrected again in the sixties as the Gold Coast R.L.F.C. In 1966 they lost the grand final to Seagulls. In 1968 the Gold Coast Tigers won the grand final against the Seagulls and won the Caltex Cup the same year. Gold Coast Tigers beat Seagulls again in the grand final in 1972 and went on to win the grand final in 1976 and 1977.

In 1978 Gold Coast Tigers changed the name to the Southport Tigers to accommodate new Gold Coast clubs. Southport Tigers went on to win the grand final of the Gold Coast competition in 1980, 1981, 1986, 1987 and 1988.

Their most successful A grade season was 2008, in which they won every match and beat Currumbin Eagles in the grand final. A win that not only saw the A Grade team win the Grand Final as undefeated Premiers but also backed it up with a Reserve Grade Premiership. In 2009,the reserves went undefeated the whole season beating Burleigh Bears 16-18 in the grand final. The A grade also had a good year defending their premiership after beating Bilambil Jets 12-6 in the grand final.

== Notable Juniors ==
Southport Tigers have produced some notable players:

- Greg Eastwood
- Steve Rogers
- Paul Wild
- Peter Inskip
- Jay Hoffman
- Clive Palmer
- Keith Harris
- Wayne Chisholm
- David Boyd
- Shaun Devine
- Jamahl Lolesi

== See also ==
- List of rugby league clubs in Australia
