= Jesse Arthars =

NZ rugby league footballer

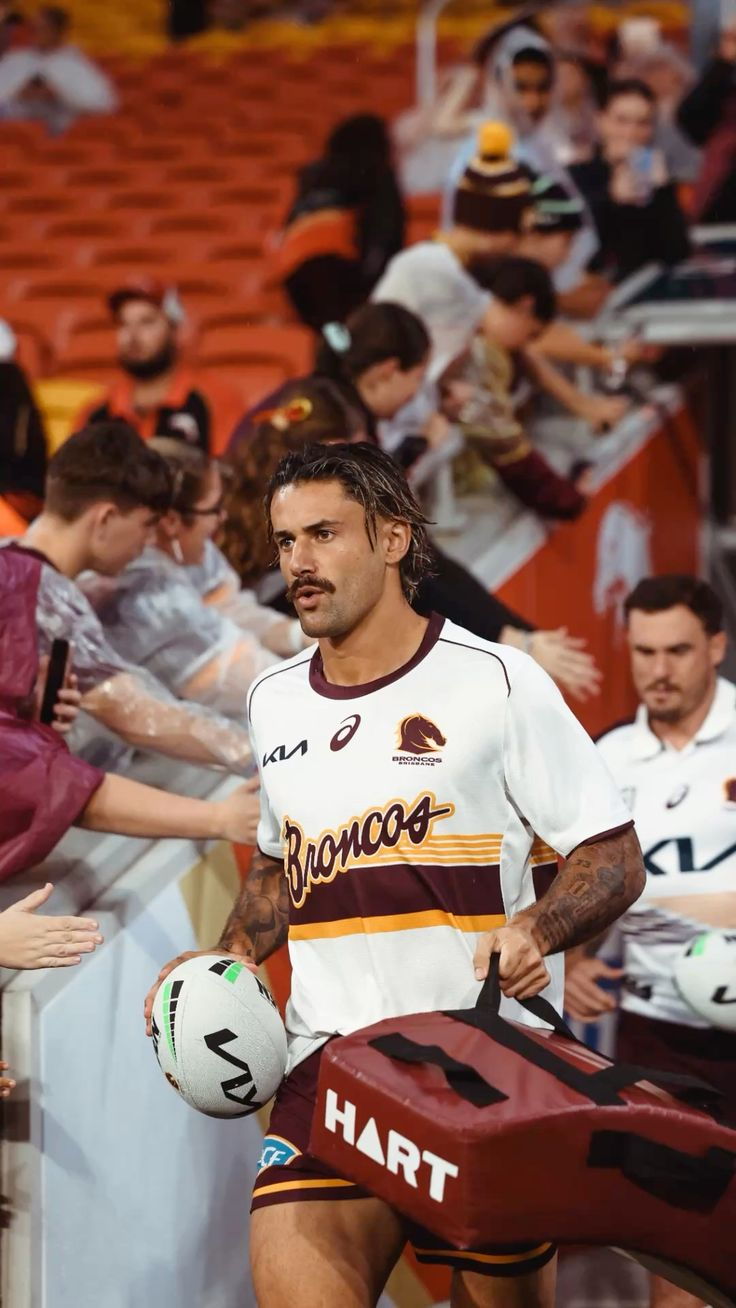

Personal information
- Full name: Jesse Arthars
- Born: 8 July 1998 (age 28) Auckland, New Zealand
- Height: 189 cm (6 ft 2 in)
- Weight: 97 kg (15 st 4 lb)

Playing information
- Position: Wing, Centre, Fullback
Club
Years	Team	Pld	T	G	FG	P
2019	Gold Coast Titans	12	2	0	0	8
2020–26	Brisbane Broncos	84	36	2	0	148
2022(loan)	→ New Zealand Warriors	12	5	0	0	20
2027–	Catalans Dragons	0	0	0	0	0
	Total	108	43	2	0	176
Representative
Years	Team	Pld	T	G	FG	P
2023–25	Māori All Stars	4	2	0	0	8
- Source: As of 19 November 2026

Jesse Arthars (born 8 July 1998) is a New Zealand professional rugby league footballer who plays as a winger or centre for the Catalans Dragons in the Super League.

He previously played for the Gold Coast Titans and the New Zealand Warriors in the NRL.

== Background ==
Arthars was born and raised in Auckland, New Zealand, he is of Māori, Samoan, Croatian and English descent. In late 2010, when Arthars was 12, his family moved to Gold Coast, Queensland, where he attended Keebra Park State High School and played junior rugby league for the Helensvale Hornets.

== Playing career ==
=== Early career ===
From 2016 to 2017, Arthars played for the Melbourne Storm in the Holden Cup, scoring 22 tries and kicked 160 goals for 408 points in 44 games.

=== 2018 ===
In 2018, Arthars signed a one-year deal to join South Sydney after leaving Melbourne Storm at the end of 2017. On 5 October 2018, Arthars was released by Souths on compassionate grounds. Arthars spent the majority of 2018 playing with South Sydney's feeder club side North Sydney in the Intrust Super Premiership NSW making 6 appearances.

=== 2019 ===
On 9 May 2019, Arthars made his NRL debut for the Titans against the Cronulla-Sutherland Sharks. In Round 22 of the 2019 NRL season, Arthars scored his first try for the Gold Coast in a 36–12 loss against Parramatta at Cbus Super Stadium.

On 29 October 2019, Arthars signed a two-year deal to join the Brisbane Broncos.

=== 2020 ===
Arthars made his club debut for the Broncos against the North Queensland Cowboys in a 28–21 victory. In the 2020 NRL season, Arthars played six games for Brisbane scoring 1 try as the club claimed the wooden spoon by finishing last on the table.

=== 2021 ===
Arthars was set to play his first game of the season in Round 6 against the Penrith Panthers before falling ill the day before the game and was replaced by Corey Oates. In the 2021 NRL season, Arthars eventually played his first game of the season against the Gold Coast Titans scoring a try, as Brisbane achieved their greatest ever comeback coming back from 22–0 down, then winning 36–28. Arthars played 11 games scoring 5 tries and kicking 2 goals in the 2021 NRL season.

=== 2022 - Loan to New Zealand Warriors ===
On 30 November, Brisbane agreed to loan Arthars to the New Zealand Warriors for the 2022 season before returning to the Brisbane club in 2023. He played 12 games, scoring 5 tries for the Warriors in 2022.

=== 2023 - Return to Brisbane Broncos ===
Arthars experienced a breakout season with Brisbane in 2023 as he cemented a starting position on the team and was the preferred wing option over veteran Corey Oates. On the 4 April 2023, Arthars resigned with the Brisbane outfit for a further three seasons. extending his deal until the end of the 2026 season. Arthars played a total of 20 games for Brisbane in the 2023 NRL season. Arthars played in Brisbane's 26–24 loss against Penrith in the 2023 NRL Grand Final. He has also been chosen to play for Toa Samoa, but ended up having to withdraw to attend the wedding of Jayden Nikorima.

=== 2024 ===
During Brisbane's round 9 loss against the Sydney Roosters in the 2024 NRL season, Arthars was taken from the field with a facial injury. It was later revealed Arthars had suffered a fractured jaw and would be ruled out for six weeks. Arthars played 19 games for Brisbane in the 2024 season as the club finished 12th on the table and missed the finals.

=== 2025 ===
In round 2 of the 2025 NRL season, Arthars scored a hat-trick in Brisbane's 32–22 loss against Canberra. In round 5, Arthars scored two tries for Brisbane in their 46–24 victory over the Wests Tigers. Arthars was selected as 18th man in the 2025 NRL Grand Final victory against Melbourne. It was the club's seventh premiership, and first since 2006.

=== 2026 ===
On 18 June, it was announced that Arthars would depart the Brisbane club at the end of the season and hours later it was confirmed that he would be joining the Catalans Dragons in the Super League for the 2027 season, on a two-year deal.

== Statistics ==
Year	Team	Games	Tries	Goals	Pts
2019	Gold Coast Titans	12	2		8
2020	Brisbane Broncos	6	1		4
2021	Brisbane Broncos	11	5	2	24
2022	New Zealand Warriors (loan)	12	5		20
2023	Brisbane Broncos	20	9		36
2024	Brisbane Broncos	19	5		20
2025	Brisbane Broncos	18	11		40
2026	Brisbane Broncos	10	5		20
2027	Catalans Dragons				
	Totals	108	43	2	176

*denotes season competing
