= Tyler Birch =

New Zealand rugby league footballer (born 1995)

Personal information
- Born: 30 December 1995 (age 29) Wellington, New Zealand
- Height: 175 cm (5 ft 9 in)
- Weight: 80 kg (12 st 8 lb)

Playing information
- Position: Centre, Wing
Club
| Years | Team | Pld | T | G | FG | P |
|---|---|---|---|---|---|---|
| 2020– | Brisbane Broncos | 2 | 0 | 0 | 0 | 0 |
Representative
| Years | Team | Pld | T | G | FG | P |
| 2019 | Māori All Stars | 1 | 1 | 0 | 0 | 4 |
- Source: RLP As of 1 December 2020

Tyler Birch (born 30 December 1995) is a New Zealand rugby league footballer who plays as a centre for the Brisbane Broncos in the NRL Women's Premiership and Burleigh Bears in the QRL Women's Premiership.

== Background ==
Born in Wellington, Birch played rugby union before moving to Australia. In Australia, she played rugby sevens for the University of Adelaide and Bond University.

== Playing career ==
In 2018, Birch joined the Burleigh Bears, starting on the wing in their 14–0 Grand Final win over the Wests Panthers. On 15 February 2019, she started on the wing and scored a try for the Māori All Stars in their 8–4 win over the Indigenous All Stars.

In May 2019, she represented South East Queensland at the Women's National Championships.

=== 2020 ===
On 28 September, Birch joined the Brisbane Broncos NRL Women's Premiership team. In Round 1 of the 2020 NRL Women's season, Birch made her debut for the Broncos, coming off the bench in a 28–14 win over the New Zealand Warriors.
