= Beaudesert Kingfishers =

Australian rugby league club, based in Beaudesert, QLD

Club information
- Full name: Beaudesert and District Junior Rugby League Football Club
- Nickname: Kingfishers
- Colours: Light Blue; Black
- Founded: 1962; 64 years ago

Current details
- Ground: R.S. Willis Park, Beaudesert, QLD
- Competition: Gold Coast Rugby League

The Beaudesert and District Junior Rugby League Football Club, more commonly known as the Beaudesert Kingfishers, was formed in 1962 as the Beaudesert Rugby League Football Club. The club is based at R.S. Willis Park in Beaudesert, Queensland and competes in the Gold Coast Rugby League. The club's emblem of the Kingfisher was adopted in 1973 and it currently fields teams in all junior grades, from under 8's to under 15's.

The Gold Coast Titans Ambassadors is Will Smith

== History ==
The current Beaudesert club was formed at the Grand Hotel in Beaudesert in 1962 when a meeting of interested parties was called to re-form the Beaudesert Rugby League Football Club. For much of its early history the club also ran teams in local touch football, netball and basketball competitions at the Beaudesert Showgrounds.

In 1970 the club purchased 2.6 hectares of land in Peterson Street, Beaudesert with the intention of building a sporting complex, with the first games at the new location played in 1972.

Between 1962 and 1975 the club participated a number of leagues, in particular the Brisbane Church League and the Brisbane Commercial League. In 1976 it was one of the five clubs to form the new Gold Coast District Rugby League. The Beaudesert competed in the GCRL until 1996 and from 1997 until 2001 it competed in the Ipswich Rugby League. Beaudesert rejoined the GCRL in 2002.

=== R.S. Willis Park ===
The Peterson Street sporting complex was officially named the R.S. Willis Park in recognition of the long time contribution to the game of Rugby League in the Beaudesert District by Ron Willis.

=== Club honours ===
Year	Competition
1964	Fassifern District Rugby League
1978	Gold Coast Rugby League
1983	Gold Coast Rugby League
1984	Gold Coast Rugby League
1990	Gold Coast/Group 18 Rugby League
1991	Gold Coast/Group 18 Rugby League
2001	Ipswich District Rugby League
2004	Gold Coast Rugby League
2009	Gold Coast Rugby League
2010	Gold Coast Rugby League
2011	Gold Coast Rugby League
2011	Gold Coast Rugby League

== Notable Juniors ==
- Chris Close
- Jamal Fogarty (2017 Gold Coast Titans)
- Keith Gee Brisbane Bronco's and Gold Coast Seagulls
- Andrew Gee Brisbane Bronco's
- Mark Gee Gold Coast Seagulls

== See also ==
- List of rugby league clubs in Australia
