= Bilambil, New South Wales =

Suburb of Tweed Shire, New South Wales, Australia

Bilambil
- Town
- Coordinates: 28°13′28″S 153°27′57″E
- Country: Australia
- State: New South Wales
- LGA: Tweed Shire
- Location: 106 km (66 mi) SSE of Brisbane; 832 km (517 mi) N of Sydney

Government
  - State electorate: Tweed
  - Federal division: Richmond

Population
  - Total: 441 (2021 census)
- Time zone: UTC+10 (AEST)
  - Summer (DST): UTC+11 (AEDT)
- Postcode: 2486

Bilambil is a town in north-eastern New South Wales, Australia, in the Tweed Shire.

The Ngandowal and Minyungbal speaking people of the Bundjalung people are the traditional owners of the Tweed region, including Bilambil, and the surrounding areas.

== Demographics ==
As of the 2021 census, the population of Bilambil was 441, 50.9% male and 49.1% female, with a median age of 45, 7 years above the Australian median.

74.4% of people living in Bilambil were born in Australia. The other top responses for country of birth were England (5.9%), New Zealand (2%) and Papua New Guinea (1.1%).

89.3% of people spoke only English at home, with Dutch (0.7%) and Polish (0.7%) also being reported.

== Sport and recreation ==
A number of well-known sporting teams represent the local area, including the Bilambil Jets, the rugby league club who play home games at Bilambil Sports Complex which is located in Bilambil Road Bilambil NSW. Bilambil Terranora soccer club play in Football Queensland South Coast competitions, despite being based in New South Wales.
