= Owen Park, Tulsa =

- Owen Park Historic District
- U.S. National Register of Historic Places
- U.S. Historic district
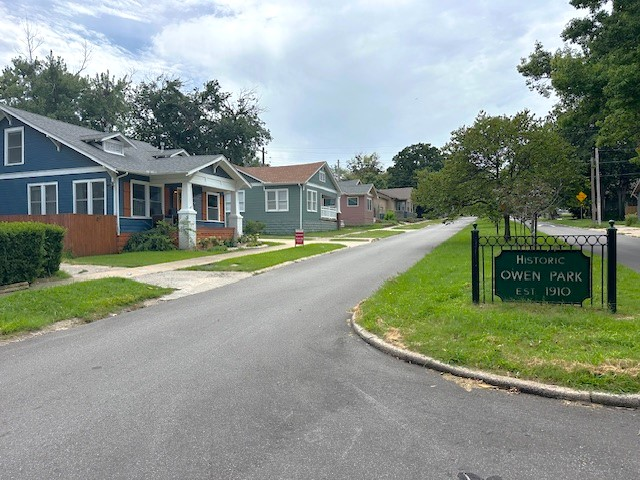
- The Owen Park district in July of 2025

- Location within Oklahoma Location within the United States
- Location: Tulsa, Oklahoma
- Coordinates: 36.160538°N 96.005425°W
- Built: 1910
- NRHP reference No.: 99001137
- Added to NRHP: September 9, 1999

Owen Park is a residential neighborhood and historic district in Tulsa, Oklahoma. Its borders are Edison Street on the north, the municipal Owen Park on the east, the Sand Springs Expressway (Hwy 412) on the south, and Zenith Avenue on the west. Opened on June 8, 1910, it was Tulsa's first municipal park. The district covers 163.48 acres (66.16 ha), while Owen Park itself covers 24 acres (9.7 ha) on the east side of the District.

== History ==
The history of the Owen Park neighborhood can be traced back to early territorial days. In 1825, preparing for the arrival of the Five Civilized Tribes in the Indian Territory, the U.S. Government made a treaty with the Osage Indians. The Osage conceded lands for the use of the Cherokee and Creek Tribes. Though the Osage were to vacate their land in Oklahoma, they were still present in 1832 when U.S. Rangers arrived with civilian observers. Among them was Washington Irving, perhaps the best known American author of the time. On October 14, the party was traveling to their camp destination at the convergence of the Cimarron and Arkansas Rivers. Pausing briefly at a lookout point, Irving enjoyed the panorama from the hilltop in the Owen Park neighborhood. The descriptions of the view can be found in his book, Tour of the Prairies. A monument to this event stands at the corner of Easton Boulevard and Vancouver Avenue.

By 1834, the Osage Tribe had been convinced to move to a reservation in Kansas. Following this period, it has been suggested that Owen Park was the location of a Creek settlement called Big Springs Town. After the Civil War, the Osage were relocated back to the land which is now Osage County. The point where the Osage, Cherokee and Creek Nations joined is commemorated by a monument in Owen Park.

=== Oldest house in Tulsa ===
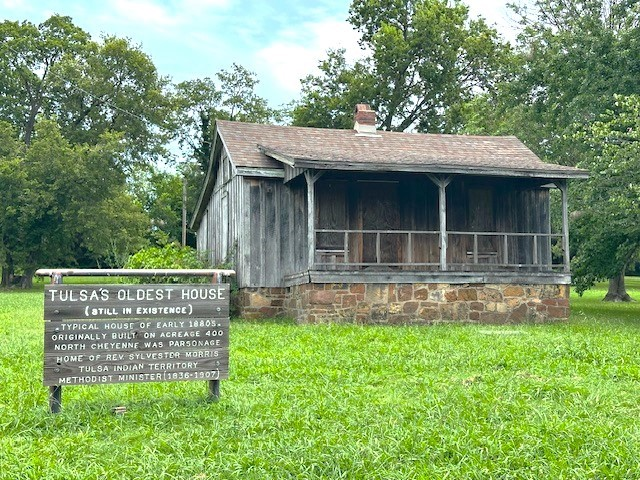
Tulsa's Oldest House, located in Owen Park, July of 2025

A Methodist missionary minister, Rev. Sylvester Morris, built a house before the Land Rush of 1889 that now stands in Tulsa's Owen Park. Originally, it stood on what became North Cheyenne Street. Morris served from 1836 until 1907. In 1976, it was set on fire, which gained the attention of Beryl D. Ford, a historian who discovered letters to Morris from 1895 within the walls. According to a sign in front of the house, it is the oldest surviving house in Tulsa.

=== Nitroglycerine explosion ===
Sometime before 1904, a large wooden warehouse-type building was erected on part of Owen's land now occupied by Owen Park. Western Torpedo Company, an early day oil well services company that used nitroglycerine for shooting oil wells stored its entire inventory of the chemical in this warehouse. On the afternoon of January 23, 1904, an employee named McDonald reportedly went to the warehouse, which erupted in a violent explosion moments later, creating a large crater and leaving no trace of McDonald. The crater was partially filled to create the first Owen Park Lake when it filled with rainwater. It was further reduced in size and renamed Owen Park Pond. In the 1930s, the Works Progress Administration built a topless, hollowed out grotto for the pond that deteriorated over time. In 1985, the grotto was rebuilt, but the original WPA style was preserved.

For several years, Tulsans made their way to Owen's now-vacant land to attend city-wide events. The first reported event was for Labor Day in 1906. July 4 became a regular event, since it could accommodate band concerts, picnics and fireworks to entertain the crowds.

== Chauncey Owen ==
Chauncey A. Owen (1847 - 1930), a Pennsylvania entrepreneur and Civil War veteran, conducted a freighting business in Kansas before coming to Indian Territory and marrying Jane Wolfe, a Creek woman. During the 1870s, Owen established himself as a leading rancher and farmer in the Broken Arrow area. Using imported white labor, he planted peach trees, cultivated large areas of fertile land, owned herds of cattle and harvested walnut timber on the Verdigris. He built a ranch home known throughout the region as the “Big House.”

In 1882, the railroad was on the way from Vinita across the Verdigris to the Arkansas River. Owen followed the railroad grading work, hauling a large tent. He used the tent as a boarding establishment. With beef and produce from his farm, he supplied hundreds of rail workers, including James Monroe Hall and his brother, Harry C. Hall. James was in charge of the railroad contracting company and Harry was one of the contracting suppliers. Although the Hall brothers are considered to be the founders of modern Tulsa, Chauncey Owen was already in the boardinghouse business at the nearby riverbank. After pitching the company store tent near the future terminal site on that summer evening in 1882, the Halls made their way to Owen's tent to sample his wife's home cooking.

Owen immediately moved his tent boardinghouse near the new terminal location, and soon after began to build the first hotel in Tulsa. The six-room wood-frame building was also Tulsa's first two-story building. Appropriately named the Tulsa Hotel, it began business in the winter of 1882. The hotel was managed by Mrs. Owen (aka "Aunt Jane") and until 1890, when it was leased and renamed the St. Elmo.

In 1892, Owen leased 80 acres (320,000 m^{2}) of his wife's Creek land to J. P. Goumaz, who built a home at Brady Street and Santa Fe Avenue. Around 1895, the Goumaz family planted 7,000 peach trees, an apple orchard, strawberry fields, and established a large concord grape vineyard from the top of the hill east to Quanah Avenue. Some remnants of the vineyard are still evident on alley fences.

== Creation of Owen Park ==
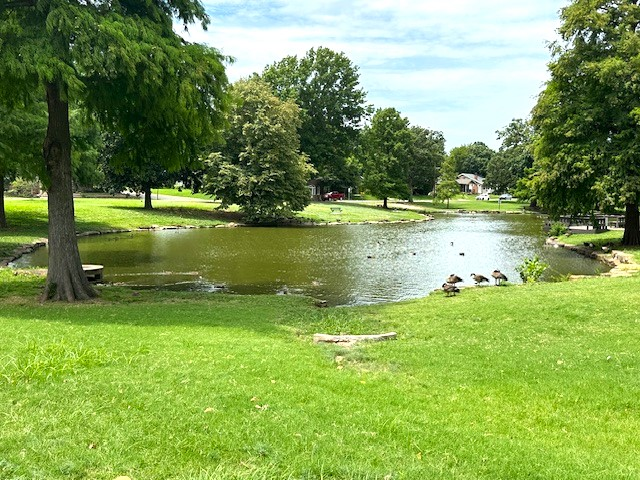
Owen Park, with lake, in July 2025

Chauncey Owen's wife, Jane, died in 1902. Her heirs received an allotment of 160 acres (0.65 km^{2}) from the Creek Nation, which encompassed the present Owen Park and neighborhood. In the early twentieth century, the lands of Owen Park were often used for public events, even before the park received official designation. Fourth of July celebrations took place there, with firework displays entertaining crowds who sometimes numbered in the thousands.

Following the discovery of oil in the summer of 1901 at Red Fork, Tulsa began to rapidly grow and prosper. Owen wanted to divide and sell his land, but at over an acre, there was scant public interest. He offered more than 20 acres (81,000 m^{2}) of park land to the city. In March 1909, the city held its first Park Commission meeting and, by August 18, 1909, decided to purchase the land from Chauncey and Mary Owen for $13,500. The decision met with criticism due to the land's price and distance from downtown. In those days, many considered it to be too far out in the country. Most were placated, though, when it was announced that a streetcar line would be run to the park, running west on Archer and turning north on Rosedale to Easton Boulevard. Owen Park officially opened on June 8, 1910.

Also in 1910, the city sold 5 acres (20,000 m^{2}) of the park land to the nearby Tulsa Vitrified Brick Company, located at the southeast edge of the park. Owen attempted to prohibit the sale. He contended that the brick company would “excavate large quantities of earth which will make a dangerous hole for the accumulation of water and the production of sickness...” and would be a “detriment to the health and comfort of the citizens.” He lost an appeal to the State Supreme Court, who held that the deed did not specify that the land would be used for park purposes only. Owen's concern proved to be prophetic when a young lad drowned in the abandoned brick pit in 1954. The city soon moved to repurchase and fill the pit. The reclaimed property was again added to the park.

In 1913, the ravine in Owen Park was dammed to create a small lake which was used as a city swimming pool. In spite of annual efforts each spring to line the pond with sand hauled by wagons from Sand Springs, it was never long before rains and usage negated those attempts. The muddy bottom, however, did not detract from its popularity. The major problem occurred when bathers, jumping from the twelve-foot tower, sometimes missed the diving hole. Lifeguards would then be called upon to rescue victims stuck in the mud. During the winter, the lake served as a skating rink. Its use as a swimming pool continued through the 1920s. Today, bathing and skating are prohibited, but fishing is a popular pastime and the lake is home to a thriving population of ducks and geese.

By 1915, the neighborhood was growing rapidly. The boulevard had been paved and the Irving monument was dedicated on April 30. An advertisement in the Tulsa World on July 4 announced that, “Lots are going fast in Tulsa’s most beautiful residence suburb—Irving Place and Park Hill.” The oil boom that had made many wealthy also provided abundant jobs for a burgeoning middle class. New homes were in high demand and residential construction progressed rapidly. By the end of the 1920s, the lots were filled with homes ranging from craftsman bungalows to estate mansions. Schools had been built in the neighborhood. In 1918, Pershing Elementary was built on the hilltop and, in 1926, Theodore Roosevelt Junior High was built on 8 acres (32,000 m^{2}) of land adjoining the park on the south.

== General description ==
OPHD is primarily residential. There are a few commercial buildings, one historic church, an elementary school and a previous junior high school, now converted into a high-school. (Tulsa School of Arts and Sciences). (Note: Irving Presbyterian Church is the historic name of the church building.) The houses were mostly wood frame with weather board siding. Some houses had shingles, stucco, brick veneer and stone veneer. Nearly all originally had wood shingle roofs, though a few had tile roofs. The shingle roofs have been replaced with asphalt composition roofs. About 70 percent of the houses were built in Bungalow Craftsman style. About 6 percent of the houses are Colonial Revival style, which was the second most popular style. Other styles include Tudor Revival (2 percent), Mission/Spanish Colonial Revival, Italian Renaissance, Modern Movement/Minimal Traditional, National Folk, and Commercial Style. A significant number (about 7 percent) are primarily garage apartments, categorized as "No Style."

== NRHP listing ==
Owen Park Historic District was added to the National Register of Historic Places on September 9, 1999.
