= Helensvale Hornets =

Australian rugby league club, based in Gold Coast, QLD

Club information
- Full name: Helensvale Junior Rugby League Football Club
- Nickname: Hornets
- Colours: Green; Yellow
- Founded: 1991

Current details
- Ground: Robert Dalley Park, Helensvale, QLD
- Competition: Gold Coast Rugby League

The Helensvale Hornets were formed in 1991 the Helensvale Hornets currently field teams in all junior grades of the Gold Coast Rugby League. The club is based at Robert Dalley Park, Helensvale, Queensland and the club's Gold Coast Titans Ambassadors are David Mead and Beau Henry.

== Notable Juniors ==
- Jesse Arthars (2019–Present Gold Coast Titans & Brisbane Broncos & New Zealand Warriors)
- Jayden Campbell (2021- Gold Coast Titans)
- Brendan Piakura (2021–Present Brisbane Broncos)

== See also ==
- List of rugby league clubs in Australia
