= Nerang Roosters =

Australian rugby league football club

Club information
- Full name: Nerang Roosters Rugby League Football Club
- Nickname: Roosters
- Colours: Navy Blue; Red
- Founded: 1977

Current details
- Ground: Glennon Park
- Competition: Gold Coast Rugby League

Records
- Premierships: 1 (2011)

The Nerang Roosters were formed in 1977 and currently field male and female teams in all junior grades of the Gold Coast Rugby League. The club is based at Glennon Park.

== Notable juniors ==
- Benji Marshall (2001 Wests Tigers 2003-2013 St George-Illawarra Dragons 2014-16 Brisbane Broncos 2017]] Wests Tigers 2018-20 South Sydney Rabbitohs 2021
- Jaelen Feeney (2016 Newcastle Knights)
- Keegan Hipgrave (2017–2021 Gold Coast Titans & Parramatta Eels)
- Kevin Kingston (2005–14 Parramatta Eels, Cronulla Sharks & Penrith Panthers)
- Blake Leary (2012–2017 North Queensland Cowboys & Manly Sea Eagles)
- Mat Rogers (1995–2001, 2007–2011 Cronulla Sharks & Gold Coast Titans)
- Keenan Palasia (2019–present Brisbane Broncos)
- Reece Walsh (2021–present New Zealand Warriors & Brisbane Broncos)
- Klese Haas (2022–present Gold Coast Titans)
- Daejarn Asi(2020–present North Queensland cowboys, New Zealand warriors, Parramatta Eels
- Zahara Temara
- Chanté Temara
- Arama Hau

== See also ==
- List of rugby league clubs in Australia
