= Currumbin Eagles =

Australian rugby league club, based in Currumbin Waters, QLD

Club information
- Full name: Currumbin Rugby League Football Club
- Nickname: Eagles
- Colours: Red; White
- Founded: 1974; 52 years ago

Current details
- Grounds: Merv Craig Sporting Complex, Currumbin Waters, QLD; Currumbin Primary School 1976; Palm Beach Currumbin High School; Betty Diamond Field Tugun
- Coach: Matt Geyer
- Competition: Gold Coast Rugby League
- 2015: 5th

Formed in 1974 as the Currumbin Football Club, the Currumbin Eagles compete in both the junior and senior Gold Coast Rugby League competitions. The club is based at the Merv Craig Sporting Complex in Currumbin Waters, Queensland and the club's Gold Coast Titans Ambassadors are Jahrome Hughes, Albert Kelly and William Zillman.

The Eagles were formed by brothers John and Mervin Hall, Beth Hall, Elaine Markwell and John and Kay Turner.

John Hall served as the club’s inaugural President with Beth Hall as Secretary and Elaine Markwell as Treasurer.

Using the Currumbin primary school ground as their home ground the club originally played in the Tweed Group 18 competition as there was no equivalent Gold Coast league. The club then moved to the PBC oval having to construct their own goal posts.

Once the Gold Coast league was formed the Eagles were required to play north of the border.

After the club contacted the Redcliffe Dolphins, they gifted the club their first jumpers which is where the iconic red and white colours are derived.

The Currumbin Eagles, although not having the backup of a leagues club like most of their opposition clubs, continue to be a competitive force in the local Gold Coast competition.

== Notable players ==
- Kevin Proctor (2008- Melbourne Storm & Gold Coast Titans)
- Ryan Simpkins (2012-18 Penrith Panthers & Gold Coast Titans)
- Jahrome Hughes (2013- Melbourne Storm, Gold Coast Titans & North Queensland Cowboys)
- Thomas Dearden (2019- North Queensland Cowboys & Brisbane Broncos)
- Xavier Coates (2019- Melbourne Storm & Brisbane Broncos)

== See also ==
- List of rugby league clubs in Australia
