= Clayton Cup =

Rugby trophy

The Clayton Cup is a trophy that was awarded by the Country Rugby League to the NSW country rugby league team with the best overall record for that season. To be eligible, the team must win the highest level of competition in its region. Usually the winner of the Clayton Cup goes through the season undefeated. In late 2019, the Country Rugby League was absorbed by the New South Wales Rugby League.

The Cup was donated by Reub Clayton, an early rugby league administrator in country NSW. The cup was first awarded in 1937 to West Tamworth. Since then, the Tweed Heads Seagulls, Grafton Ghosts, North Tamworth Bears and Cobar Roosters have been the most successful clubs, each winning the trophy three times.

== Winners ==
Year	Club	Group	P	W	L	D	For	Agst	Pct	Coach	Report
1937	West Tamworth	4	22	22	0	0					MG
1938	Nimmitabel	19 (Original)								George King	DL
1939	Wagga Magpies	13	21	17	2	1	314	60	83.96%	Eric Weissel	DA
1940	Henty	13	13	12	0	1	234	72	76.47%	Brian Bourke	DA
No cup awarded for 1941-1945 seasons due to World War II
1946	Port Kembla	Illawarra	18	16	0	2	412	196	67.76%	Harry Nolan	RLN
1947	Bombala	19 (Original)									
1948	Cootamundra	9	30	27	3	0	469	252	65.05%	Bob Hobbs	CH
1949	Tumut	9	24	15	7	2	225	225	50.00%	Jim Jeffrey	TAT
1950	Bathurst Railway	10	19	16	3	0	284	109	72.26%	W 'Snow' Garlick	NA
1951	North Tamworth Bears	4	16	15	1	0				Vic Williams	NMH
1952	Gundagai	9	44	35	9	0	1074	501	68.19%	Nev. Hand	DA
1953	Young	9	25	21	4	0	777	230	77.16%	Ian Johnston	NA
1954	Orange CYMS	10	18	16	2	0	300	119	71.60%	Mick Newland	LM
1955	Young (2)	9	33	30	3	0	1056	297	78.05%	Leo Trevena	YTC
1956	Maitland	Newcastle									RLN
1957	Temora	9	25	19	4	2	455	183	71.32%	Tom Kirk	
1958	Coonamble	14	20	19	0	1	311	81	79.34%	Ray Hyde	RLN
1959	Dubbo Macquarie	11	18	17	1	0	472	118	80.00%	Leo Nosworthy	
1960	Goulburn Workers	8								Phil Jackson	CT
1961	Ballina	1								John Gillard	RLN
1962	Warialda	5	18	17	1	0	511	165	75.59%	Jim Payne	
1963	Tweed Heads Seagulls	18									
1964	Oberon	10	18	16	2	0	427	66	86.61%	Rolf Trudgett	
1965	Tullibigeal	17									
1966	Picton Magpies	6	14	12	1	1	172	63	73.19%	Billy Peel	
1967	Casino RSM	1	18	18	0	0	480	126	79.21%	Terry O'Brien	RLN
1968	Darlington Point	17	21	20	1	0	864	79	91.62%	Bill Watson	RLN
1969	Tarcutta	13	14	12	2	0	362	84	81.17%	A. Hills	CT
1970	Delegate	19 (Original)	14	14	0	0	388	118	76.68%	Paul Clear	BT
1971	Cobar	15	16	13	1	2	521	218	70.50%	Brian Lawrence	
1972	Cobar (2)	15	17	16	1	0	567	239	70.35%	Brian Lawrence	RLN
1973	Gunnedah	4	16	15	1	0	427	122	77.78%	Roger Buttenshaw	
1974	Queanbeyan United	8	17	17	0	0	499	116	81.14%	Don Furner	CT
1975	Albury Blues	13	18	17	1	0	680	219	75.64%		CT
1976	Bombala (2)	16	22	21	1	0	653	179	78.49%	B. Laurence	CT
1977	Belconnen United	19 (Canberra)	17	16	1	0	406	106	79.30%	Bob Belford	CT
1978	Sawtell	2	20	20	0	0	461	152	75.20%	Les Cleal	CT
1979	Scone	21	14	14	0	0	428	152	73.79%	Les Cleal	
1980	Narwan	19	16	16	0	0	563			Eric Kelly	CT
1981	Bellingen	2	18	18	0	0	504	97	83.86%	R Taylor	
1982	Warilla	7	20	18	1	1	552	171	76.35%	Col O'Rourke	
1983	Tweed Heads Seagulls (2)	18	16	15	1	0	432	119	78.40%	John Harvey	
1984	Bourke	15	15	15	0	0	606	166	78.50%	Tony Bock	
1985	Tumbarumba	13	16	16	0	0	770	111	87.40%	Les Cleal	
1986	Tumbarumba (2)	13	16	16	0	0	639	91	87.53%	Les Cleal	
1987	Lismore Marist Brothers	1	18	17	0	1	481	196	71.05%	Denis Meaney	
1988	Bega Roosters	16	16	16	0	0	630	138	82.03%	Lloyd Martin	
1989	Tweed Heads Seagulls (3)	18	17	16	1	0	558	155	78.26%	John Harvey	
1990	Singleton	21	23	22	0	1	855	263	76.48%	Richard Jones	
1991	Mittagong Lions	6	22	21	1	0	803	204	79.74%	Graeme Andrews	CT
1992	Western Suburbs	Newcastle	20	20	0	0	630	248	71.75%	Neil Baker	
1993	Rankins Springs	17	16	15	1	0	494	190	72.22%	Stuart Vearing	
1994	Forster Tuncurry Hawks	3	14	14	0	0				Dennis Tutty	
1995	Forster Tuncurry Hawks (2)	3	19	19	0	0				Dennis Tutty	
1996	Werris Creek	4	16		0		857	272	75.91%	Ron Dellar	
1997	Eden	16	17	17	0	0				Chris Brennan	
1998	Cobar (3)	11	18	18	0	1				Scott Mieni	
1999	Barellan	17									
2000	Taree City	3	17	16	1	0	776	293	72.59%	Terry McCartney	
2001	Port Macquarie Sharks	2	20	19	0	1					
2002	Barellan (2)	17	12	11	1	0	394	175	69.24%	Clint Halden	
2003	Narooma	16	14	14	0	0				David Boyle	
2004	Temora (2)	9	19	19	0	0	964	218	81.56%	Chris Brennan	
2005	Umina Beach	Central Coast	20	19	1	0	770	242	76.09%	Nathan Johnson	
2006	Hillston Bluebirds	17	12	12	0	0	450	148	75.25%	Steve Parr	TAN
2007	Albion Park-Oak Flats	7	16	16	0	0	606	270	69.18%	Jade Lucas & Shane Sainsbury	
2008	The Entrance Tigers	Central Coast			0	0				Gavin Westwood	
2009	Yenda	20	18	16	2	0				Andrew Lavaka	RLW
2010	Grafton Ghosts	Northern Rivers	18	18	0	0	807	206	79.66%	Col Speed	DM
2011	Grafton Ghosts (2)	Northern Rivers	18	16	1	1	566	237	70.49%	Col Speed	DE
2012	East Campbelltown Eagles	6	18	18	0	0				Richard Barnes	CA
2013	Wauchope Blues	3	14	14	0	0	552	196	73.80%	Robbie Trembath	WG
2014	North Tamworth Bears (2)	4	17	17	0	0	1061	263	80.14%	Brad McManus	NDL
2015	Port Macquarie Sharks (2)	3	14	13	1	0	484	197	71.07%	Matt Shipway	
2016	Moruya Sharks	16	16	16	0	0	754	228	76.78%	Tim Weyman	TB
2017	Grafton Ghosts (3)	2	18	18	0	0	852	158	84.36%	Danny Wicks	DE
2018	Tweed Coast Raiders	Northern Rivers	21	18	2	1	604	236	71.90%	Brent Kite	TDN
2019	North Tamworth Bears (3)	4	14	14	0	0	700	164	81.02%	Scott Blanch	NDL
No cup awarded for the 2020 and 2021 seasons due to the COVID-19 pandemic
2022	Scone Thoroughbreds (2)	21	14	14	0	0	750	148	80.27%	Adam Clydsdale	NSWRL
2023	Gulgong Terriers	Castlereagh League	13	13	0	0	500	190		Brad James	NSWRL
2024	Camden Rams	Macarthur Rugby League	16	16	0	0	689	120		Jake Dooner & Brad Speechley	BFBF
2025	Coolah Kangaroos	Castlereagh League	13	13	0	0	486	160		Chanse Burgess & Casey Burgess	BFBF

== Sources ==
Years	Item	Via
1937 to 1954	Various Newspapers	Trove
1937 to 1973	Rugby League News	Trove
1960 to 1991	Canberra Times	Trove
1967–69, 1971–1996	Country Rugby League Annual Report	State Library of NSW
2003 to 2014	Rugby League Week	eResources at State Library of NSW
2010 to 2019	Various Newspaper Websites	As referenced
2015 to 2019	Group Rugby League past seasons	SportsTG websites - No longer available
2022-present	New South Wales Rugby League	Website
2023-present	Battlers For Bush Footy	Website

== See also ==
- Rugby league in New South Wales
- http://crlnsw.com.au/country-rugby-leagues-clayton-cup-oberon-saturday/ - List to 2013
- dailytelegraph.com.au - Story on 2017 winners
- https://www.tweeddailynews.com.au/news/ziebell-and-raiders-take-out-top-country-league-go/3540117/ - Story on 2018 winners
