= Tom Learoyd-Lahrs =

Australia international rugby league footballer

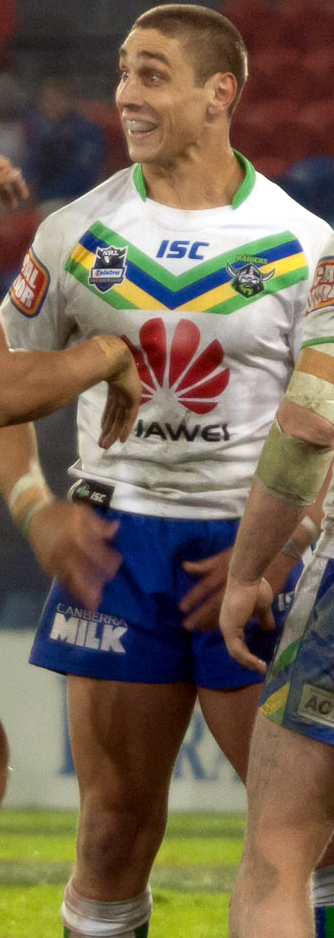

Personal information
- Full name: Thomas Learoyd-Lahrs
- Born: 13 September 1985 (age 41) Tweed Heads, New South Wales, Australia

Playing information
- Height: 194 cm (6 ft 4 in)
- Weight: 115 kg (18 st 2 lb)
- Position: Prop, Second-row
Club
Years	Team	Pld	T	G	FG	P
2004–05	Brisbane Broncos	10	0	0	0	0
2006–14	Canberra Raiders	109	8	0	0	32
2015	Melbourne Storm	1	0	0	0	0
	Total	120	8	0	0	32
Representative
Years	Team	Pld	T	G	FG	P
2005	Queensland Residents	1	0	0	0	0
2009–10	New South Wales	4	0	0	0	0
2010–12	NSW Country	3	0	0	0	0
2010–12	Indigenous All Stars	3	0	0	0	0
2010	Australia	4	0	0	0	0
- Relatives: Kaiden Lahrs (son)

Tom Learoyd-Lahrs (born 13 September 1985) is an Australian former professional rugby league footballer who played in the 2000s and 2010s. An Australian international and New South Wales State of Origin representative, he played in the National Rugby League (NRL) for the Brisbane Broncos, Canberra Raiders and the Melbourne Storm.

== Background ==
Learoyd-Lahrs was born in Tweed Heads, New South Wales and is of Indigenous Australian and German descent. Growing up, he spent time in Kingscliff, New South Wales and Wandoan, Queensland before moving to Tamworth, New South Wales in his early teens, where he boarded at Farrer Memorial Agricultural High School. In Tamworth, he played junior rugby league for the Werris Creek Magpies and North Tamworth Bears.

While at Farrer, Learoyd-Lahrs signed a scholarship contract with the Brisbane Broncos and represented the Australian Schoolboys in 2003 and 2004, New South Wales under-17 in 2002 and New South Wales under-19 in 2003. In 2003, he played for the New South Wales under-19 side.

== Playing career ==
=== Brisbane Broncos ===
In Round 2 of the 2004 NRL season, Learoyd-Lahrs made his NRL debut for the Broncos in their loss to the Parramatta Eels at Suncorp Stadium. He played a further seven NRL games in 2004, including the Broncos' Qualifying Final loss to the Melbourne Storm. He also represented Queensland under-19, Queensland Residents and the Junior Kangaroos.

In 2005, Learoyd-Lahrs played just two NRL games for the Broncos, spending the majority of the season with the Toowoomba Clydesdales in the Queensland Cup, where he once again represented the Queensland Residents.

=== Canberra Raiders ===
In 2006, he joined the Canberra Raiders, where he played just 31 games over three injury-interrupted seasons. In 2009, he rediscovered his best form and was selected to play for New South Wales in the Game III of the State of Origin series.

In 2010, he played 20 games for the Raiders and all three games for New South Wales in State of Origin. In October, he made his Test debut for Australia, playing four games in the Four Nations. Following his breakout season in 2010, Learoyd-Lahrs would play just 42 games over the next four seasons due to injuries. In 2014, his final season at the club, he did not feature in first grade.

=== Melbourne Storm ===
On 1 September 2014, Learoyd-Lahrs signed with the Melbourne Storm for the 2015 season.

He played just one game for the Storm, their Round 2 loss to the Manly Sea Eagles, and five games for their Queensland Cup feeder club, the Sunshine Coast Falcons, due to a knee injury. In October 2015, he announced his retirement from the NRL.

=== Post-NRL career ===
In 2016, following his NRL retirement, Learoyd-Lahrs returned to Tamworth, playing for the North Tamworth Bears, winning the Group 4 premiership with the club. In 2021, he moved to Townsville, Queensland with his family and worked as a coach for the Norths Thuringowa Devils in the Townsville & Districts Rugby League competition in 2022.

== Personal life ==
In 2005, Learoyd-Lahrs, who played under the name Tom Learoyd up until that point, added Lahrs to his surname in honour of his biological father, Michael Lahrs. His son Kaiden Lahrs is currently a member of the North Queensland Cowboys NRL squad.
