= Scone Thoroughbreds =

Australian rugby league club, based in Scone, NSW

Club information
- Full name: Scone Thoroughbred Rugby League Football Club
- Colours: Blue; White

Current details
- Ground: Scone Park, Scone
- CEO: Jamie Munn
- Competition: Group 21 Rugby League

Records
- Premierships: 20 (1954, 1958, 1966, 1969, 1970, 1972, 1976, 1979, 1988, 1994, 1995, 1996, 1998, 1999, 2000, 2003, 2006, 2016, 2018, 2019)

Scone Thoroughbreds is a country rugby league team, based in Scone, New South Wales, competing in the Group 21 competition under the auspices of the Country Rugby League.

The club is the most successful team in Rugby League history, winning 29 titles in its existence. The Thoroughbreds surpassed the South Sydney Rabbitohs in terms of 1st grade premierships in 1994.

In addition, they won the Clayton Cup once in 1974, and an undefeated club Premiership (2003).

Players successfully moving up to NRL from the club are John Morris, Darren Albert and Todd Lowrie, Noel and Les Cleal, and local legend Don "Bandy" Adams, all of whom have represented Australia.

The club plays its games at Scone Park, located along Hill Street, Scone. The club's colours are blue and white, using jerseys similar to that of the Canterbury Bulldogs.

In 2006, Scone won both the first grade and under 18s titles, defeating Singleton 26–6 and Aberdeen 10–6 respectively at Scone Park. In 2018, with all four grades winning their grand finals, culminating in an upset victory over rivals Aberdeen Tigers 10–6 at Aberdeen.

On Saturday 7 September 2019 the first grade team convincingly beating Aberdeen 40–6 at Scone Park. In addition the ladies league tag was won 18–10 beating Murrurundi.

== Premiership titles ==
Years Won
1922	1930	1931	1932	1938	1940	1950	1951	1952	1954	1955	1958	1966	1969	1970	1972	1976	1979	1988	1994	1995	1996	1998	1999	2000	2003	2006	2016	2018	2019

== Notable Juniors ==
Notable First Grade Players that have played at Scone Throughbreds include:

- Don "Bandy" Adams
- Rees Duncan
- Les Cleal
- Noel Cleal (1980–90 Eastern Suburbs & Manly Sea Eagles)
- Darren Albert (1996–06 Newcastle Knights & Cronulla Sharks)
- John Morris (2001–14 Newcastle Knights, Parramatta Eels, West Tigers & Cronulla Sharks)
- Todd Lowrie (2003–15 Newcastle Knights, Parramatta Eels, Melbourne Storm, NZ Warriors & Brisbane Broncos)
- Dane Tilse (2004–2016, Newcastle Knights, Canberra Raiders) and Hull Kingston Rovers
- Adam Clydsdale (2013–2017Newcastle Knights & Canberra Raiders)
- Cade Cust (2019- Manly Sea Eagles, Wigan Warriors, Salford Red Devils & Hull FC)
- Jock Madden (2021- West Tigers & Brisbane Broncos)
