= Central Coast Junior Rugby League =

Central Coast Division Junior Rugby League
- Current season or competition: 2019 season
- Sport: Rugby league
- Website: http://www.sportingpulse.com/assoc_page.cgi?c=0-2377-0-0-0
- Related competition: Central Coast Rugby League

Central Coast Division Junior Rugby League (CCDJRL) is a junior rugby league competition based on the Central Coast of NSW, Australia. There are 17 teams ranging from Under 6's to Under 17's. There are non-competitive competitions for Under 6's to Under 9's and competitive competitions for Under 10's to Under 17's.
