= David McLean (rugby league) =

Australian rugby league footballer

Personal information
- Full name: David McLean
- Born: 5 October 1977 (age 47); Sydney, New South Wales, Australia

Playing information
- Position: Second-row, Centre
Club
Years	Team	Pld	T	G	FG	P
1998	Balmain Tigers	1	0	0	0	0
2001–05	Penrith Panthers	10	1	0	0	4
	Total	11	1	0	0	4
- Source: As of 9 January 2024

David McLean (born 5 October 1977) is an Australian former professional rugby league footballer who played for the Balmain Tigers and the Penrith Panthers in the NRL.

== Playing career ==
A Parramatta junior, McLean was graded by the now defunct Balmain Tigers in 1997. He made his first grade debut from the bench in his side's 30−16 loss to the Newcastle Knights at Leichhardt Oval in round 23 of the 1998 season. This was his only game of first grade for Balmain. The Tigers finished the season in 13th position and folded at the end of following the season. McLean remained at Balmain during the 1999 season, but did not make any appearances in first grade. Balmain controversially merged with rivals the Western Suburbs Magpies to form the Wests Tigers as part of the NRL's rationalization strategy. McLean was not offered a contract to play with the newly formed team for the 2000 NRL season and subsequently left the club at season's end.

He later joined the Penrith Panthers, making his club debut for Penrith coming off the bench in his side's 31−12 loss to the Cronulla Sharks at Penrith Stadium in round 6 of the 2001 season. This was his only first grade appearance in the 2001 season. His opportunities in the top grade would be limited in the coming seasons, with solitary appearances in both 2003 and 2004 and in the meantime being captain of the St. Marys-Penrith Cougars in the NSWRL Premier League.

In 2005 however he earned some more consistent time in the NRL, making 7 appearances that were spaced out throughout the season. Although primarily a forward his one starting appearance for the Panthers that year was at centre. His final game of first grade came in his side's 38−22 victory over the Wests Tigers at Stadium Australia in the final round of the 2005 season. At season's end he left the Panthers, taking up the role of captain-coach of Berkeley Eagles in the Illawarra competition. In 2007 he was crowned the player of the year by the Country Rugby League, and later joined Ourimbah Wyoming Magpies in the Central Coast competition where he played out his career. Post-career he stayed on at the Central Coast and was involved with coaching with a number of clubs.
