= St Edwards Bears =

Australian rugby league club on the Central Coast, NSW

Club information
- Full name: St Edwards Junior Rugby League Football Club
- Colours: Red; Black
- Founded: 1970; 56 years ago

Current details
- Ground: Various grounds (Central Coast)
- Competition: Central Coast Division of Country Rugby League

The St Edwards Bears are an Australian rugby league club based on the Central Coast of New South Wales. Although they share a name with St Edward's College, East Gosford, the Bears operate as an independent community club and are not administered by the college.

== History ==
The club was founded in 1970 and initially competed as a junior rugby league organisation. St Edwards quickly became one of the leading junior clubs on the Central Coast, winning the junior club championship in 1971 and again in 1972, 1973 and 1974.

For much of its history the club fielded multiple junior teams across the local Central Coast competition. Over time the junior program declined, and the club eventually ceased entering junior sides.

== Senior team ==
In 2013 the club entered a team in the Open Age competition for the first time. Following the discontinuation of the junior program, the Open Age side became the club’s sole remaining team. The senior squad is largely composed of former St Edward’s College students and past juniors who continue to represent the club and maintain its identity.

Since the inception of the senior side, the Bears have appeared in four Open Age Grand Finals, though they were unsuccessful in each attempt. The team was coached during this period by Mark Churcher, who led the side during all four Grand Final campaigns.

As of 2025, the team is captain-coached by Dale Wilson.

== Club structure and identity ==
The Bears do not operate with a permanent clubhouse or dedicated home ground, instead utilising available fields within the Central Coast competition schedule. Despite this, the club has retained a continuous presence in the local rugby league community through its senior team. The club's traditional colours are red and black.

== Honours ==
- Junior Club Champions (7): 1971, 1972, 1973, 1974, 2014, 2018, 2019
- Under 16 (2): 1994, 1997
- Under 16 Division 2 (1): 2005
- Under 10 Division 3 (1): 2014
- Under 14 Division 3 (1): 2018
- Under 15 Division 3 (1): 2019

== Team Numbers ==
Team numbers obtained and compiled from competition tables and match results published in the newspapers, Central Coast Express, Wyong Shire Advocate and Central Coast Express Advocate. Numbers for 2003 and 2011 taken from copies of the Central Coast Division Junior Rugby League Yearbook of those years, supplied by Toukley Hawks RLFC. Age groups Under 9 and younger not included as team numbers from 1985 to 2011 not known to the author.

== See also ==
- List of NSW Central Coast Rugby League First Grade Premiers
