= Bega Roosters =

Australian rugby league club, based in Bega, NSW

Club information
- Full name: Bega Roosters Rugby League Football Club
- Short name: The Roosters
- Colours: Red, Blue, White
- Founded: 1960; 66 years ago

Current details
- Ground: Bega Recreation Ground, Bega
- Chairman: Ricky “chooka” Staplegun
- Competition: Group 16 Rugby League
- 2022: Premiers

Records
- Premierships: 12 (1966, 1971, 1972, 1985, 1986, 1987, 1988, 1990, 2000, 2001, 2014, 2022)
- Runners-up: 15 (1967, 1970, 1979, 1981, 1983, 1991, 1994, 2008, 2010, 2011, 2013, 2015, 2016, 2018, 2019)
- Minor premierships: 12 (1968, 1970, 1977, 1985, 1986, 1987, 1988, 1994, 2000, 2001, 2018, 2019)

The Bega Roosters are an Australian rugby league football team based in Bega, a coastal town of the Far South Coast region of New South Wales. The club was formed in 1960 as the result of the amalgamation of the Bega Rovers and the Bega West football clubs who were also both members of Group 16 Rugby League.

== History ==
After forming in 1960 from the Bega Rovers-Bega West merger, the club's first premiership came in their seventh season when Jim Gibson's men defeated Moruya 9–7 in the 1966 Grand Final.

The side then took back-to-back premierships in 1971 and 1972. The best years of the club came in the late 1980s when the side won five grand finals in six years including four straight from 1985 to 1988. The club would have to wait a decade before claiming back-to-back titles yet again in 2000 and 2001.

=== Name, colours, and emblem ===
Bega plays in a red, blue and white predominant strip and were known as the tri-colours. Wearing a similar jersey to their NSWRL counter parts Easts (Sydney), they adopted their nickname "Roosters". The emblem is of a Rooster running with a football wearing a tri-colours jersey. The name "Bega Roosters" is inscribed underneath. This is similar to the logo of the Sydney City Roosters in the late 1990s.

=== Home ground ===
The Bega Roosters play out of the Bega Recreation Ground for their home games.

== Juniors ==
- Matt McCoy (1945–52 Eastern Suburbs Roosters & St George Dragons)
- Deon Apps (2011 South Sydney Rabbitohs)
- Dale Finucane (2012– Canterbury Bulldogs & Melbourne Storm)
- Kezie Apps (2018– St George Illawarra Dragons)

== Honours ==
=== Team ===
- Group 16 Rugby League Premierships: 12

1966, 1971, 1972, 1985, 1986, 1987, 1988, 1990, 2000, 2001, 2014, 2022

- Group 16 Rugby League Runners-Up: 15

1967, 1970, 1979, 1981, 1983, 1991, 1994, 2008, 2010, 2011, 2013, 2015, 2016, 2018, 2019

- Clayton Cup: One

1988

== See also ==
- Country Rugby League
