= Kezie Apps =

Australia international rugby league footballer

- Apps in 2018

Personal information
- Born: 4 February 1991 (age 35) Bega, New South Wales, Australia
- Height: 182 cm (6 ft 0 in)
- Weight: 82 kg (12 st 13 lb)

Playing information
- Position: Second-row, Prop
Club
Years	Team	Pld	T	G	FG	P
2018–22	St George Illawarra Dragons	19	2	0	0	8
2023–	Wests Tigers	21	6	0	0	24
	Total	40	8	0	0	32
Representative
Years	Team	Pld	T	G	FG	P
2018–26	New South Wales	16	1	0	0	4
2014–26	Australia	26	4	0	0	16
2015–17	Women's All Stars	3	0	0	0	0
2019	Australia 9s	3	1	0	0	4
2024	Prime Minister’s XIII	1	1	0	0	4
- Source: As of 16 November 2026
- Relatives: Deon Apps (brother)

Kezie Apps (born 4 February 1991) is an Australian rugby league footballer who plays as a second-row for the Wests Tigers in the NRLW and the NSWRL Women's Premiership.

She is an Australian international and New South Wales representative.

== Background ==
Born in Bega, New South Wales, Apps played her junior rugby league for the Bega Roosters alongside current Cronulla Sharks player Dale Finucane. Apps later said "Going through life before playing, I loved sport and I really wanted to play sport. But I'm not a small person – I'm a big human – so I stood out for the wrong reasons being tall and with my build. In a way I didn't fit in, but finding rugby league, I felt my purpose. I could use my strength and build in a sport I absolutely loved, and I never thought that would be possible."

At age 12, she was forced to stop playing due to age restrictions that were in place. Her older brother Deon, played two games for the South Sydney Rabbitohs in 2011.

== Playing career ==
In 2014, Apps returned to rugby league, joining the Helensburgh Tigers women's side. Later that year, she made her debut for New South Wales in the annual Women's Interstate Challenge against Queensland and Australia in their Four Nations curtain-raiser against New Zealand. At the end of the season, she was named the Illawarra Women's Player of the Year and the NSWRL Women's Player of the Year.

In 2015, she made her debut for the Women's All Star side in their fixture against the Indigenous All Stars.

On 28 September 2016, she won the women's Dally M Medal for Player of the Year at the Dally M awards.

In October 2017, she was named in Australia's 2017 Women's Rugby League World Cup squad. On 2 December, she started at second row in the Jillaroos 23-16 final win over the New Zealand.

In June 2018, Apps, along with Sam Bremner and Talesha Quinn, were named as the three marquee players for the St. George Illawarra Dragons women's team which commenced playing in the NRL Women's Premiership in September.

On 6 October 2019, she captained the Dragons in their 6–30 Grand Final loss to the Brisbane Broncos Women.

== Achievements and accolades ==
=== Individual ===
- Dally M Medal: 2016
- NSWRL State Player of the Year: 2014, 2016

Captained NSW to State of Origin win in 2022

St George Illawarra Dragons NRLW Captain 2021 - 2022

=== Team ===
- 2017 Women's Rugby League World Cup: Australia – Winners

=== Representative ===
- Rugby League World Cup Champion: 2026
