= Todd Lowrie =

Australian rugby league footballer

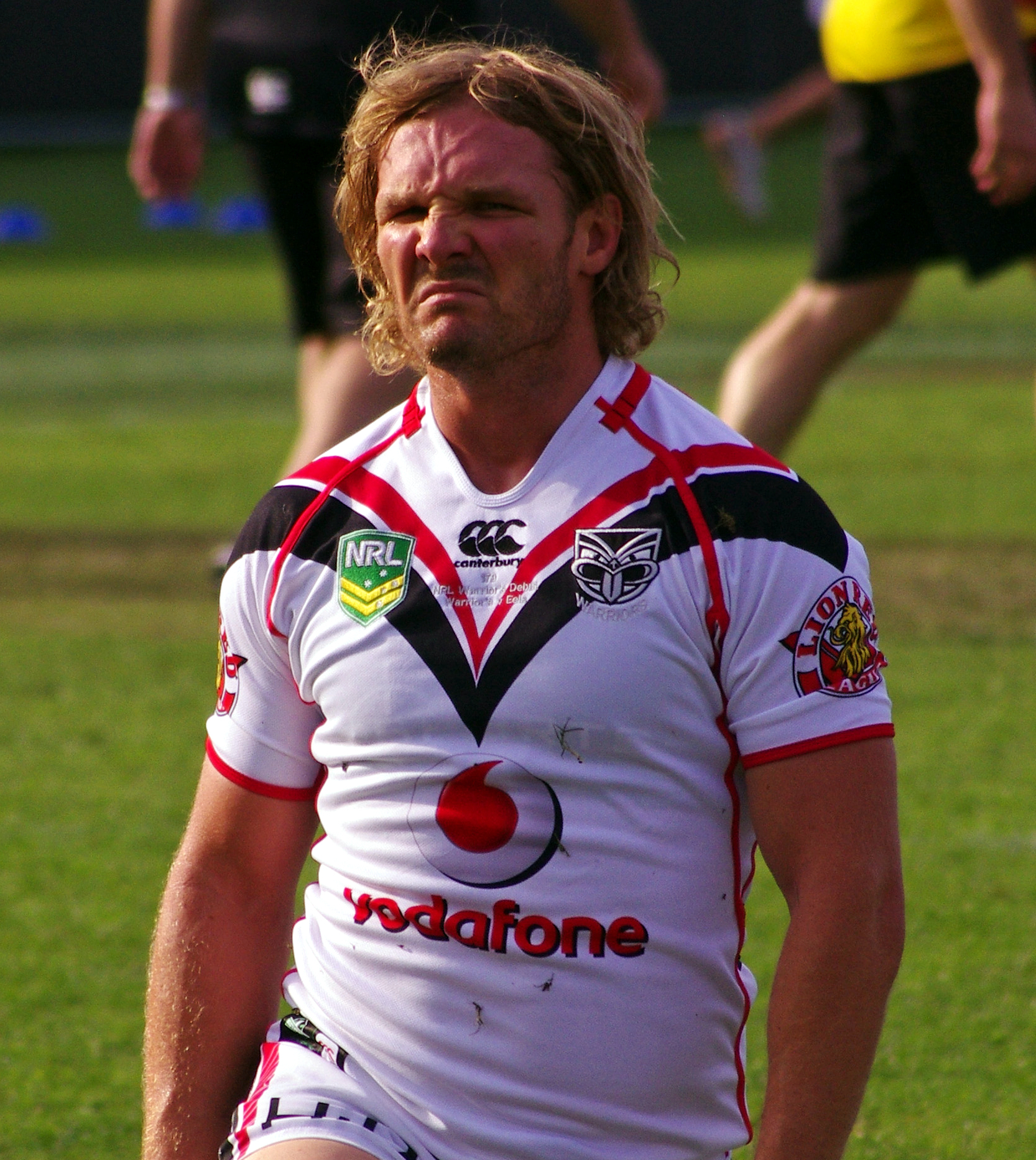

Personal information
- Born: 14 July 1983 (age 43) Scone, New South Wales, Australia

Playing information
- Height: 187 cm (6 ft 2 in)
- Weight: 98 kg (15 st 6 lb)
- Position: Lock, Second-row
Club
Years	Team	Pld	T	G	FG	P
2003–06	Newcastle Knights	57	7	0	0	28
2007–09	Parramatta Eels	42	2	0	0	8
2010–12	Melbourne Storm	65	6	0	0	24
2013	New Zealand Warriors	21	0	0	0	0
2014–15	Brisbane Broncos	18	1	0	0	4
	Total	203	16	0	0	64

Todd Lowrie (born 14 July 1983) is an Australian former professional rugby league footballer. He played at lock and second-row and played for the Newcastle Knights, Parramatta Eels, Melbourne Storm, New Zealand Warriors and Brisbane Broncos.

== Early years ==
In his younger years Lowrie was a State representative athlete in a number of track, field and sporting events.

His father, Bert Lowrie, is the current team manager for the State of Origin NSW Blues, and has a major role in the Country Rugby League.

== Playing career ==
A Scone Thoroughbreds junior, Lowrie began his career with the Newcastle Knights between 2003 and 2006.

He joined the Parramatta Eels in 2007. After a few extensive injuries to the Parramatta Eels squad Lowrie was given a chance in the first-grade run on side, he played almost every game of the 2009 season and has proved himself to be a valuable and hard-working asset to the team. Lowrie played for Parramatta in the 2009 NRL grand final against Melbourne where despite a second half comeback the eels went down 23-16.

The Melbourne Storm announced the signing of Todd Lowrie for the 2010 and 2011 seasons. In the first season that Lowrie joined Melbourne, the club were stripped of the two premierships they won and ordered to play the 2010 season for no points after it was revealed the club deliberately breached the salary cap from 2006 until 2010. He played in their 2012 Grand Final victory over Canterbury-Bankstown, despite suffering a leg injury in the club's final training session before the match.

In 2013, Lowrie signed the New Zealand Warriors for two seasons. After the 2013 season Lowrie was released on compassionate grounds.

After his release from the Warriors, Lowrie was signed by the Brisbane Broncos. Just two days before the Broncos 2014 match against the Manly-Warringah Sea Eagles, Lowrie commented on Brookvale Oval, labelling it a "shithole", claiming that "the [field is] heavy, muddy and boggy". On the night of the game, Lowrie was interchanged into the match and met with a chorus of boos from the Manly fans. He played 18 games for the Broncos in the 2014 NRL season but did not play a first grade game in 2015, instead playing for the Norths Devils in the Queensland Cup.

On 25 July 2015, Lowrie signed a one-year contract to return to the Newcastle Knights starting in 2016. However, on 6 November 2015, before playing a game, he announced his retirement from rugby league to instead take up the Knights' NYC head coaching role.

== Post playing ==
In March 2020, Lowrie was named as the coach for the Scone Thoroughbreds. On 3 November 2022, Lowrie returned to the Storm as the development coach for the Storm's feeder side.

== Statistics ==
Year	Team	Games	Tries	Pts
2003	Newcastle Knights	6		
2004	Newcastle Knights	15	1	4
2005	Newcastle Knights	15	1	4
2006	Newcastle Knights	21	5	20
2007	Parramatta Eels	2		
2008	Parramatta Eels	14	1	4
2009	Parramatta Eels	26	1	4
2010	Melbourne Storm	22	1	4
2011	Melbourne Storm	19	1	4
2012	Melbourne Storm	23	4	16
2013	New Zealand Warriors	21		
2014	Brisbane Broncos	18	1	4
	Totals	203	16	64
