= North Tamworth Bears =

Australian rugby league football club based in Tamworth, NSW

Club information
- Full name: North Tamworth Bears Rugby League Football Club
- Nickname: The Bears
- Colours: Red; Black
- Founded: 1911

Current details
- Ground: Jack Woolaston Oval
- CEO: Greg Hodge
- Competition: Group 4 Rugby League
- 2019: Premiers

Records
- Premierships: 23 (1913, 1921, 1924, 1926, 1927, 1929, 1931, 1950, 1951, 1953, 1980, 2005, 2006, 2007, 2008, 2014, 2015, 2016, 2017, 2018, 2019, 2022, 2023)
- Runners-up: 15 (1912, 1914, 1919, 1920, 1922, 1923, 1930, 1952, 1984, 2000, 2001, 2003, 2011, 2012, 2013)
- Minor premierships: 8 or more (2003, 2005, 2006, 2007, 2014, 2016, 2017, 2019)

The North Tamworth Bears are a rugby league team located in the suburb of North Tamworth, in Tamworth, New South Wales, Australia. They were formed in 1911, three years after Rugby league came to New South Wales, and are one of the oldest clubs in New South Wales, in particular in the Country. They play in the Group 4 Rugby League competition, which is administered by the New South Wales Country Rugby League. The North Tamworth Bears won the 2006 premiership beating the Coonabarabran Unicorns.

== History ==
The North Tamworth Bears were formed in 1911 and were first known as the Rebels until 1947. They played their first game at No 1 Oval at 4:10 P.M. on 22 July 1911, which was also to be the first game of rugby league to be played in Tamworth. The team was made up of nearly the entire first grade North Tamworth Rugby Union team who switched codes. As the rebels they played in 14 grand finals between 1911 and 1947 winning seven of these games.

From 1947 to 1955 the club were known as the Tri-colours and during this period the team played in four grand finals, winning three.

1951 – Won Clayton's cup awarded to most successful Country league team.

In 1956 the Tri-colours changed their name to the Bears which is currently their name. Between 1965 and 1967 the Bears established their own oval and facilities on Manilla Road. The oval and facilities were titled Jack Woolaston Oval in 1985 in commemoration of the founding President Jack Woolaston.

During the 1980s the bears played in two grand finals winning the 1980 game, however losing the 1984 game.

The club's first grade team made the grand final two consecutive years in 2001, 2002 and also in 2003 however they lost all three matches. In 2005 the Bears won the Northern Division pre-season club championship, first grade major premiership, the minor premiership and the pre-season Knockout.

Additionally the Reserve Grade and Under 18 teams won the minor premiership and both were grand finalists.

In 2006 the first grade team won the Northern Division pre-season club championship, the preseason Easter knockout competition, and were undefeated for the entire regular season. The Bears then won their second successive premiership against the Coonabarabran Unicorns at Jack Woolaston Oval. The reserve grade team also won the premiership.

2014 saw the Bears win the first grade premiership against the Gunnedah Bulldogs, a feat that earned them the Clayton Cup for the first time since 1951.

2000 Runners up 2001 Runners up 2002 Runners up 2003 Runners up 2005 First grade premiers against West Tamworth Lions 34–28 2005 the Bears won the Northern Division pre-season club championship, first grade major premiership, the minor premiership and the pre-Season Knockout. 2006 First grade premiers against Coonabarabran Unicorns 42–14 2007 First grade premiers against West Tamworth Lions 32–12 2008 First grade premiers against West Tamworth Lions 8–6 2009 Runners up 2011 Runners up 2012 Runners up 2013 Runners up 2014 saw the Bears win the first grade premiership against the Gunnedah Bulldogs, a feat that earned them the Clayton Cup for the first time since 1951. 2015 first grade premiers against West Tamworth Lions 46–25 2016 first grade premiers against West Tamworth Lions 36–12 2017 first grade premiers against Narrabri Blues 30–22 2018 first grade premiers against Gunnedah Bulldogs 34–28 2019 first grade premiers against Kootingal Roosters 40–4 a feat that earned them the Clayton cup for the third time, earning the title along with 3 other CRL as the most successful clubs for country league. North Tamworth bears have won 6 successive grand finals 2019 undefeated.

== Playing record ==
Playing record compiled from scores published in the Rugby League Week.

Year	Group	Ladder Position	Points	Final Position	Report
1984	4	Played Finals		Grand Finalist	
1985	4	10	8		
1986	4	8	10		
1991	4	3	19	Semi-finalist	
1992	4	Missed Finals			
1993	4	Missed Finals			
1994	4	Missed Finals			
1995	4	Missed Finals			
1996	4	Missed Finals			
1997	4	7	8		
1998	4	9	6		
1999	4	4	22	Semi-finalist	
2000	4	2	28		
2001	4	4	25		
2002	4	7	10		
2003	4	1	30		
2004	4	3	28	Semi-finalist	
2005	4	1	31	Premiers	
2006	4	1	35	Premiers	
2007	4	1	35	Premiers	
2008	4	2	34	Premiers	
2009	4	2	22		
2010	4	4	22	Semi-finalist	
2011	4	2	23	Grand Finalist	YT
2012	4	2	29	Grand Finalist	
2013	4	3	19	Grand Finalist	NDL
2014	4	1	30	Premiers	NDL
2015	4	2	26	Premiers	
2016	4	1	27	Premiers	NBN YT
2017	4	1	26	Premiers	NDL YT
2018	4	2	24	Premiers	NDL
2019	4	1	28	Premiers	

== Sources ==
- 1 North Tamworth Bears History retrieved 14 July 2007
