= Deon Apps =

Australian rugby league footballer (born 1987)

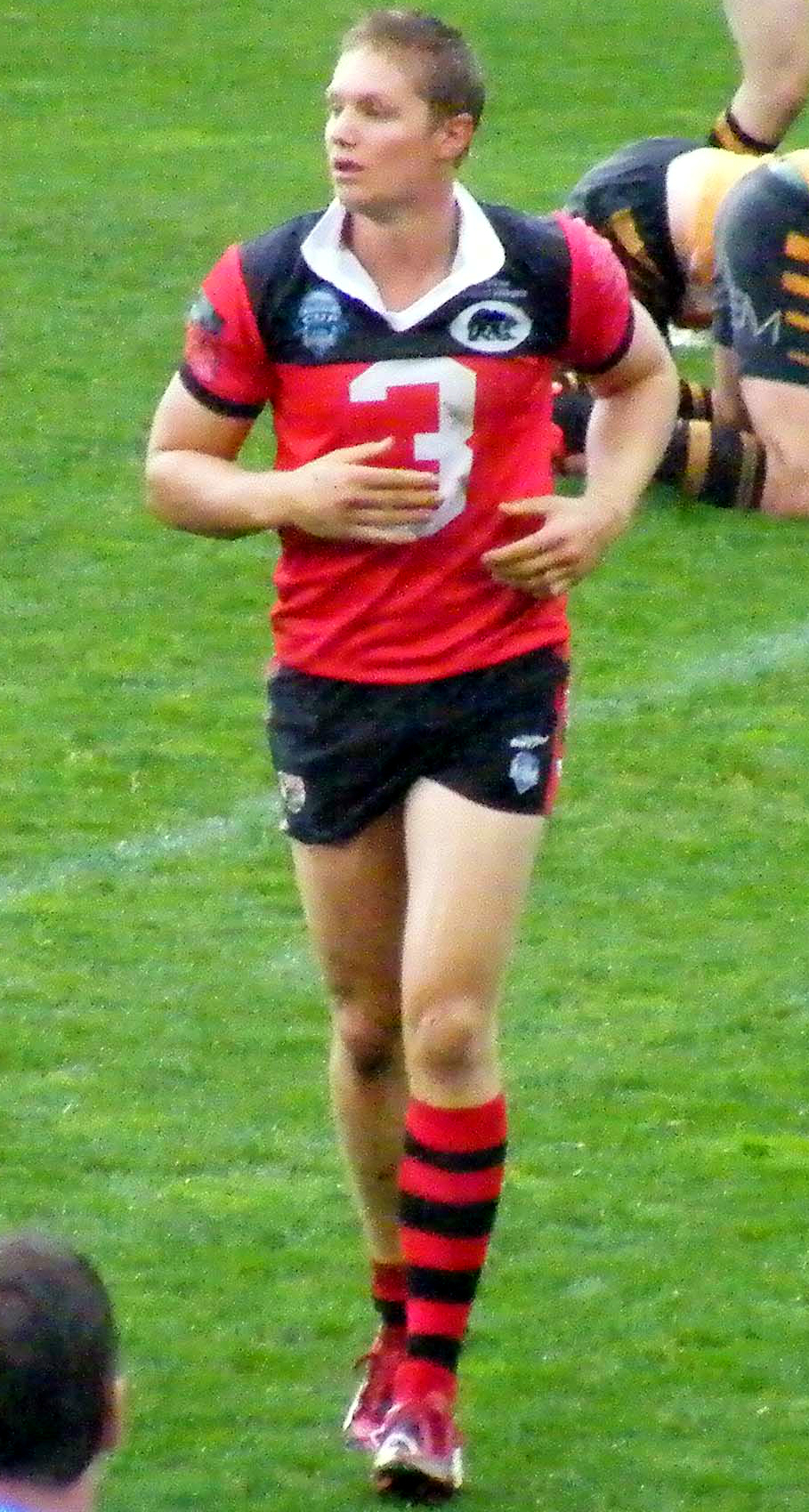

Personal information
- Born: 12 October 1987 (age 39) Bega, New South Wales, Australia

Playing information
- Height: 185 cm (6 ft 1 in)
- Weight: 99 kg (15 st 8 lb)
- Position: Second-row
Club
| Years | Team | Pld | T | G | FG | P |
|---|---|---|---|---|---|---|
| 2011 | South Sydney | 2 | 0 | 0 | 0 | 0 |
- Relatives: Kezie Apps (sister)

Deon Apps (born 12 October 1987) is a former professional rugby league footballer who played for the South Sydney Rabbitohs in the National Rugby League.

== Background ==
Deon Apps was born in Bega, New South Wales, Australia.

== Playing career ==
Apps made his National Rugby League debut during round 12 of the 2011 NRL season against the Penrith Panthers. Apps played a total of 51 games for Norths after spending a majority of his time playing in the NSW Cup.

His junior club was the Bega Roosters and his nickname iPhone was given to him by club hooker Issac Luke. He is the older brother of Dragons, Blues and Jillaroos representative player Kezie Apps.
