= Group 19 Rugby League (1950–1970) =

Australian rugby competition

The Original Group 19 Rugby League was a competition which ran from the 1950 until 1970, in the Southern Tablelands region of New South Wales. Many clubs left for other competitions after this time, including Group 16 and Group 8. The Group 19 tag was then transferred to Canberra and later Northern New South Wales.

== History ==
A senior Rugby League competition under the enumeration Group 19 ran from the post-war years until 1970. Participating teams included Bibbenluke, Bombala, Delegate, Jindabyne and (usually) Adaminaby. In most seasons two or three Cooma teams participated – the Cooma Rovers and St Patricks, Cooma Blues or Cooma Citizens. Employees engaged in the Snowy River Scheme fielded teams for short periods – Public Service, Snowy and the intriguingly named Utah-Island Bend.

In 1971 the northern Group 19 clubs – Cooma Rovers, Adaminaby, Jindabyne, Cooma Citizens and Nimmitabel agreed to combine playing resources and field a team in the Group 16 competition, as the Alpine Wanderers. The three teams from southern Monaro, Bibbenluke, Bombala and Delegate, also joined the combined competition, although they remained separate clubs.

The enumeration Group 19 was later redeployed to the Canberra District competition, before again being used in the Northern Tablelands of New South Wales, with teams from Armidale, Glen Innes, Guyra, Narwan, Uralla and Walcha competing under that banner in the 1980s.

== Former Teams ==
Club	Moniker	Years	Premierships
Adaminaby			1952
Berridale			None
Bibbenluke	Roosters	??	1963
Bombala	Blueheelers	??–1970	1950, 1966–68
Cooma	Blues	??–1970	
Cooma	Citizens	??–1970	1951, 1955
Cooma	Rovers	??–1970	1956, 1958, 1960
Cooma	St Patricks	??–1970	1959, 1962
Delegate	Tigers	??–1970	1969–70
Jindabyne	Bears	??–1970	1954, 1961, 1965
Nimmitabel	Magpies	None	
Public Service			1957
Snowy			1953
Utah-Island Bend			1964

== Grand Finals ==
Season	Grand Final information				Minor Premiers
Season	Premiers	Score	Runners-up	Report	Minor Premiers
1950	Bombala	17–14	Cooma	CME	Bombala
1951	Cooma	13–3	Bombala	CME	Cooma
1952	Adaminaby	14–8	Bombala	CME	Bombala
1953	Snowy	8–5	Bombala	CME	Bombala
1954	Jindabyne	11–10	Snowy	CME	Jindabyne
1955	Cooma-Snowy	18–11	Bombala	CME	Cooma-Snowy
1956	Cooma Rovers	9–7	Berridale	CME
1957	Public Service	11–7	Berridale	CME	Cooma Rovers
1958	Cooma Rovers	8–7	St Patricks	CME	Cooma Rovers
1959	St Patricks	18–10	Cooma Rovers	CME	St Patricks
1960	Cooma Rovers	9–5	Adaminaby	CME
1961	Jindabyne	9–5	Cooma Rovers	CME	Cooma Rovers
1962	St Patricks	8–3	Cooma Rovers	CME	Cooma Rovers
1963	Bibbenluke	13–12	Bombala	CME	Bombala
1964	Utah-Island Bend	21–14	Bombala	CME	Utah-Island Bend
1965	Jindabyne	32–2	Delegate	CME	Jindabyne
1966	Bombala	20–9	Jindabyne	CME
1967	Bombala	14–8	Cooma Rovers	CME
1968	Bombala	20–0	Cooma Rovers	CME	Cooma Rovers
1969	Delegate	20–13	Bombala	CME	Cooma Rovers
1970	Delegate	15–7	Bibbenluke	CME	Delegate
