= Country Rugby League =

Governing body for rugby league football in rural New South Wales, Australia

- Founded: 1934
- Ceased: 2019
- Responsibility: Regional New South Wales
- Membership: 24 leagues (296 senior clubs)
- Key people: Jock Colley (Chair); Terry Quinn (Chief Executive)
- Website: crlnsw.com.au

(New South Wales)
- As of 1 December 2009

The Country Rugby League of New South Wales (CRL), formed in 1934 and disbanded in 2019, was the governing body for the sport of rugby league football in areas of New South Wales outside the Sydney metropolitan area until it merged with NSW Rugby League in 2019. The CRL was superseded by 6 NSWRL Country Divisions represented by 4 members of the nine-person NSWRL board. Despite its name, the CRL also governed rugby league in the Australian Capital Territory. Apart from selecting a Country Origin side to play in the annual City vs Country Origin game, the CRL administered many senior and junior competitions across the state.

== History ==
Country Rugby League logo used until 2012

In New South Wales, Newcastle was the first city outside Sydney to start a league competition, despite being involved in the Sydney Premiership in 1908–09 and then starting their own competition in 1910.

On 11 February 1911, the Hunter District Rugby Football League (HDRFL) was established at a large meeting in Maitland, thus becoming the first branch of the New South Wales Rugby League in "the bush" (i.e. outside the urban centres of Sydney and Newcastle). The HDRFL territory encompassed a lower part of the Hunter Valley from Singleton down to the Maitland district and towns on the nearby coalfields (the major ones being Cessnock, Kurri Kurri and Weston). Competition games were scheduled to kick off on 13 May but were pushed back to 20 May when clubs complained they had not had enough time to practice the new code. In the first senior-grade games played, West Maitland defeated Kurri Kurri (12–0) and Cessnock defeated Morpeth (23–0) in a double-header on the enclosed Albion Ground at Maitland.

On 13 May 1911, another branch of the NSWRL was established in the Wollongong area, the Illawarra Rugby League. A Goldfields' League was formed in West Wyalong, and games were played in Tamworth, Aberdeen, and along the South Coast. The game was introduced to Orange in 1912 and spread quickly through the western districts. In 1913 branch leagues were formed at Bathurst, Dubbo, Nowra and Tamworth.

In 1920, the NSWRL set up a Country Committee. NSW Country was divided into six sections: South Coast, Northern Districts, Central Northern Districts, Western Districts, Southern, and North Coast. The group system was introduced in 1922, with neighbouring towns being organised into 12 groups.

The Country Rugby League (CRL) was officially formed in 1934, "subject to the NSW Rugby League still being the paramount institution." In 1939 a dispute arose between the CRL and the NSWRL. The CRL wanted a new administration structure, an equal partnership in which the NSWRL looked after league in Sydney, and the CRL looked after it in the bush. When their proposal was rejected the CRL broke away from the NSWRL for a week, but returned to the fold with a promise that a committee would be set up to sort things out. Eventually the CRL gave in on the grounds that it was in no one's best interests to have the game divided during World War II.

The NSWRL and CRL have since cooperated in the running of rugby league in NSW, including various 'joint ventures' such as the Ron Massey Cup which features three teams from areas under the control of the CRL.

On 24 August 2018, the NSWRL and CRL announced that they had entered into a Memorandum of Understanding to begin formal discussions in relation to a possible merger of the two organisations, and a single body governing all rugby league in the state for the first time in more than 80 years. In 19 October 2019 the organisations merged after the NSWRL agreed a new constitution and the CRL, over a year ahead of time.

== Representative ==
The CRL selected the Country New South Wales rugby league team from its inception in 2011. The first City versus Country match (advertised as such by the NSWRL in the Sydney Morning Herald of 10/6/1911) was played at the Sydney Agricultural Ground on that same Saturday. City won 29–8 with a team composed exclusively of players from the Newcastle ("Northern") and the Hunter competitions.

The first NSW Country team to tour was a squad of 17 players (12 from Newcastle and 5 from Hunter) that was unbeaten in four matches. The team played three matches in Queensland between 5/8/1911 and 12/8/1911, defeating Queensland twice and a Queensland Country representative side once. They then travelled to Sydney to play the Sydney Metropolitan team, again winning 31–24.

Both sides were originally made up of the best players playing in the Country Rugby League and the Sydney-based NSWRL Premiership. However, the increasing drain of players from rural areas to the NSWRL clubs led to the City side becoming increasingly dominant and the Country side uncompetitive.

On 21 November 2016, the NRL announced that the City versus Country annual match would be scrapped, with the 2017 match to be the final edition. The fixture would be revived without NRL participation in 2021, with players selected entirely from NSWRL competitions.

The first ever country divisional match (described as such in the Maitland Daily Mercury of 31/7/1911) was played at Newcastle on 29/7/1911 between Newcastle and Hunter, the home side winning 29–14.

== Regions ==
The CRL administered the following senior competitions:

=== Region 1 – East Coast Dolphins ===
- **Northern Rivers Regional Rugby League** (Group 1 and 18's Merger)*
- Group 2 Rugby League (Northern Mid North Coast)*
- **Group 3 Rugby League** (Southern Mid North Coast)*
- Hastings League (Mid North Coast Second Tier)

=== Region 2 – Greater Northern Tigers ===
- Group 4 Rugby League (Western New England)*
- Group 19 Rugby League (New England)*
- Group 21 Rugby League (Hunter)*

=== Region 3 – Bidgee Bulls (Riverina & Monaro Colts) ===
- **Canberra Division Rugby League**
  - George Tooke Shield
- **Group 9 Rugby League** (Wagga Wagga and Districts)*
- Group 16 Rugby League (Far South Coast)*
- Group 17 Rugby League (Western Riverina Community Cup)
- Group 20 Rugby League (Griffith and Districts)*

=== Region 4 – Western Rams ===
- **Group 10** (Central West)*
- **Group 11** (Dubbo and Districts)*
- Group 14 Rugby League (Castlereagh Cup)
- Barwon Darling Rugby League
- Outback Rugby League (Outback RL)
- Woodbridge Cup (Central West Division 2)
- Mid-West Cup (Central West Division 3)

=== Region 5 – Greater Southern ===
- **Illawarra Division Rugby League***
- **Group 6 Rugby League** (Macarthur & Southern Highlands)*
- **Group 7 Rugby League** (South Coast & Southern Highlands)*

=== Region 6 – Newcastle & Central Coast ===
- **Central Coast Division Rugby League***
- **Newcastle Division Rugby League***
- Newcastle & Hunter Rugby League

* = Top-level Country leagues; Premiers eligible for Clayton Cup as best regional team in the state.

Major leagues in bold.

=== NRL Victoria Competitions Involving NSW Teams ===
- Goulburn Murray Rugby League
- Sunraysia-Riverlands Rugby League

== Disbanded Groups ==
- Group 1 Rugby League – merged with Group 18 to form Northern Rivers Regional Rugby League (still hold junior competitions)
- Group 5 Rugby League – now forms part of Group 19
- Group 8 Rugby League – merged with Group 19 (Canberra) in 1980 to form ACTRL and CDRL, which formed Canberra Rugby League in 1982
- Group 13 Rugby League – now part of the Group 9 Rugby League in Region 3 (Bidgee Bulls)
- Group 18 Rugby League – merged with Group 1 to form Northern Rivers Regional Rugby League (still holds junior competitions)
- Group 19 Rugby League (1950-1970) - Southern Tablelands, merged into Group 16 in c.1978-79
- Group 19 Rugby League (1974-1979) - Canberra district, merged with Group 8 in 1980 to form ACTRL and CDRL, which formed Canberra Division in 1982
- Sunraysia-Riverlands Rugby League (reformed briefly as a singular side in 1997 in Group 12, later reformed by the Victorian Rugby League).

== Team of the Century ==
In 2008, rugby league football's centenary year in Australia, the Country Rugby League named its 'Team of the Century':

1. Clive Churchill (Central Newcastle)
2. Brian Carlson (North Newcastle)
3. Eddie Lumsden (Kurri Kurri)
4. Michael Cronin (Gerringong)
5. Graeme Langlands (Wollongong)
6. Bob Fulton (Wests Wollongong)
7. Andrew Johns (Cessnock)
8. Steve Roach (Wests Wollongong)
9. Ian Walsh (Condobolin)
10. Glenn Lazarus (Queanbeyan Blues)
11. Herb Narvo (North Newcastle)
12. Bradley Clyde (Belconnen United)
13. Wally Prigg (Wests Newcastle/Centrals Newcastle)

== Junior competitions ==
- Andrew Johns Cup – named after Andrew Johns, made up of players aged under 16 from NSW-based clubs and includes both junior regional representative teams and junior teams of National Rugby League (NRL).
- Laurie Daley Cup – named after Laurie Daley, the competition includes both junior representative teams from regional rugby league clubs and junior teams of National Rugby League clubs, made up players under 18.

== Player of the Year Award ==
Year	Player	Club
1965	Laurie Moraschi	Griffith
1966	Terry Pannowitz	Maitland
1967	Allan Thomson	Newcastle
1968	Allan Thomson	Newcastle
1969	John Cootes	Newcastle
1970	Les Hutchings	Condobolin
1971	Dick Jeffrey	Glen Innes
1972	Brian Burke	Maitland
1973	John Donnelly	Gunnedah
1974	Mick Cronin	Gerringong
1975	Steve Hewson	Queanbeyan
1976	Peter Kennedy	Forbes
1977	Barry Pearson	Illawarra
1978	Ray Brown	Griffith
1979	Pat Smith	Maitland
1980	Perry Haddock	Erina
1981	Terry Regan	Cessnock
1982	Willie Tarry	Cessnock
1983	Paul Field	Cootamundra
1984	Ross Gibson	Wyong
1985	Peter Hawthorne	Griffith
1986	Neil Moy	Parkes
1987	Steve Walters	Lakes United
1988	Chris Cumming	Aberdeen
1989	Mark Ryan	Moree
1990	Paul Danes	Wagga Wagga
1991	Richard Jones	South Newcastle
1992	Trevor Crow	South Newcastle
1993	Warren Douch	Erina
1994	Brian Quinton	Kurri Kurri
1995	Jamy Forbes	Cessnock
1996	Brett Gallard	Orange
1997	Darren Leaney	Bellingen
1998	Paul Skovgaard	Western Suburbs Newcastle
1999	Troy Clear	Belconnen
2000	Jarrod O'Doherty	Western Suburbs Newcastle
2001	Jamie O'Connor	Burleigh Heads
2002	Ryan Dagwell	Newcastle
2003	John Johnson	Scone
2004	Phil Stonham	Queanbeyan
2005	Chris Bailey	Northern Blues
2006	Darren Jackson & Dean Amos	Cobar / Northern Blues
2007	David McLean	Berkeley
2008	Grant Wooden	Wagga Wagga
2009	Grant Wooden	Wagga Wagga
2010	Mitch Williams	Wyong
2011	Jimmy Grehan	Wests Illawarra
2012	Todd Maloney	Umina
2013	Rory O'Brien & Riley Brown	Collegians Illawarra / Cessnock
2014	Chris Adams	Cessnock
2015	Jarrod Thompson	Collegians Illawarra
2016	Chris Adams	Lakes United
2017	Tori Freeman-Quay	Belconnen
2018	Caleb Ziebell	Cudgen
2019	Cameron Vazzoler	Illawarra South Coast

== See also ==
- List of CRL clubs
