= Toukley Hawks =

Australian rugby league club, based on the Central Coast, NSW

Toukley RLFC

Club information
- Full name: Toukley Rugby League Football Club
- Colours: Blue; Gold
- Founded: 1967; 59 years ago

Current details
- Ground: Darren Kennedy Oval
- Competition: Central Coast Division of Country Rugby League
- 2025 RLCC First Grade: Finished 2nd in reg. season

Records
- Premierships: 2 (2022, 2023)
- Runners-up: 2 (2024, 2025)
- Minor premierships: 1 (2023)

The Toukley Hawks are an Australian rugby league football youth club based in the suburb of Toukley on the Central Coast of New South Wales. They have numerous teams competing in competitions run by the Central Coast Division of Country Rugby League, from U/7s through to First Grade. The Hawks' current home ground is Darren Kennedy Oval and their traditional colours are blue and gold. Toukley reached their maiden first grade Grand Final in 2022 and won against the Erina Eagles 20-10, their first premiership since the club began in 1967.

== History ==
Toukley began as a junior rugby league club in 1967. In 1971, when Group 12 Schoolboys switched from weight limit teams to age limit teams, Toukley fielded a side in each age group from Under 8 to Under 14, although not in Under 15.

When a Second Division competition commenced in 1976, Toukley entered a team. The Hawks' were competitive in their inaugural season of senior football and reached the semi-finals. The following year, Toukley finished at the top of the table, then defeated Milson Island in a major-semi-final and Wyong in a Grand Final, to claim the Second Division premiership.

Toukley switched to First Division in 1979 and entered teams in First Grade, Second Grade, Third Grade, Under 19s and Under 17s. During the 1980s, Toukley's appearances in finals football were limited. The Hawks were Second Grade Grand Finalists in 1981 and Under 18 Semi-finalists in 1985, 1988 and 1989.

In 1991 Toukley qualified for the finals series in Third, Second and, for the first time, First Grade. Sadly for the club, all finals matches were lost by small margins. In Third Grade Toukley had led 8–0 after twenty minutes, but The Entrance won 22–16. In Second Grade, Erina led 18–0, before a rally by the Hawks saw the scores level, 20-all at full time. Two tries by Erina in the second period of extra-time denied Toukley, 28–20 being the final score. One week later, Toukley met Erina in the First Grade major semi-final. The 6-all half-time score, was broken by an Erina field goal. A later try was added by the Eagles, to beat the Hawks 11–6. Toukley then met Woy Woy in the preliminary final. Despite dominating possession and field position in the first twenty minutes, Toukley trailed 12–2 at half-time. A try, conversion and later penalty goal by Toukley reduced the margin to two points, but Woy Woy kicked away with an unconverted try and subsequent field goal. Final score, 17–10.

In 1995 Toukley dropped out of First Division and returned to Second Division, which came to be known as the Saturday League. The number of wins each season increased over the ensuing seasons, culminating in a Grand Final win over the Peninsula Raiders in 1998. The match was scoreless for 76 minutes, at which point the Raiders landed a field goal. Toukley responded in the last minute, "On the fourth tackle the ball went out the backline until lock and captain Mark Burns had to regather a sloppy pass. In desperation Burns passed back inside to David Sant, who sped through a gap" and "crashed over beside the posts". The try was converted, 6–1 the full time score.

Toukley's success in the Saturday League continued in 1999 as they reached the Grand Final undefeated. The Hawks led early and again late in the second half, prior to a penalty goal by opponents Budgewoi taking the score to 14-all at full time. Toukley scored a converted try early in extra-time and held on to win, 20–14.

Toukley and Budgewoi met again in the 2000 Grand Final. A strong performance in the first half saw the Hawks cross for five tries and lead 22–0 at the break. The Bulldogs rallied and a second try with nine minutes to go, brought them within ten points. Toukley, however, held firm to win 22–12, and claim a third successive Saturday League title.

Budgewoi players and supporters must have derived both satisfaction and relief when they defeated Toukley in the minor semi-final of 2001, ending the Hawk's season. Budgewoi went on to win the Grand Final.

After finishing seventh in 2002, Toukley returned to the final series in 2003. The second division competition was now known as the Ken Cosgrove Cup. Losing the major semi-final to defending premiers Central Wyong (10–20), Toukley recovered with a win over Gosford Cougars, 38–14, to set-up a rematch. Trailing by six points for much of the second half, "a try to fullback Daniel Lewis with 13 seconds remaining followed by a storming performance in extra-time propelled the Toukley Hawks to grand final glory." Two unconverted tries were added by Toukley, to win 24–16.

Toukley had strong seasons in the Ken Cosgrove Cup in 2004 and 2005, finishing as losing Finalists in both years. In 2006, local Rugby League was reorganised and the second division competition was discontinued. Toukley entered teams in First Grade, Second Grade and Under 17s and finished in sixth or seventh place in each competition.

The club has fielded a team in many of the senior-level competitions since, and reached three lower grade grand finals: Under 17s and the inaugural Open Age league in 2010 and Under 18/1s in 2012.

In 2015 and 2016 Toukley fielded teams in First Grade, Reserve Grade, Open Age and in Ladies League Tag. In 2017, the club also entered an Under 19 team, competing in all five senior competitions. In 2017 the club has fielded 23 junior teams, from Under 6's to Under 17's, an increase of six teams from 2016, and the most in the club's 50 year history.

== Notable Juniors ==
Jack Cogger Adam Keighran Daniel Saifiti Jacob Saifiti

== Honours and records ==
=== Team ===
- First Grade (2); 2022, 2023
- Second Division (5): 1977, 1998, 1999, 2000, 2003.
- Under 17 (1): 2014.
- Under 16 (1): 2013.
- Under 16 Division 2 (2): 2012, 2016.

== Team Numbers ==
Team numbers obtained and compiled from competition tables and match results published in the newspapers, Central Coast Express, Wyong Shire Advocate and Central Coast Express Advocate. Numbers for 2003 and 2011 taken from copies of the Central Coast Division Junior Rugby League Yearbook of those years, supplied by Toukley Hawks RLFC.

== See also ==
****** There is likely some inaccurate information on this page as updates are rare.

- List of NSW Central Coast Rugby League First Grade Premiers
