= Dale Finucane =

Australian rugby league footballer

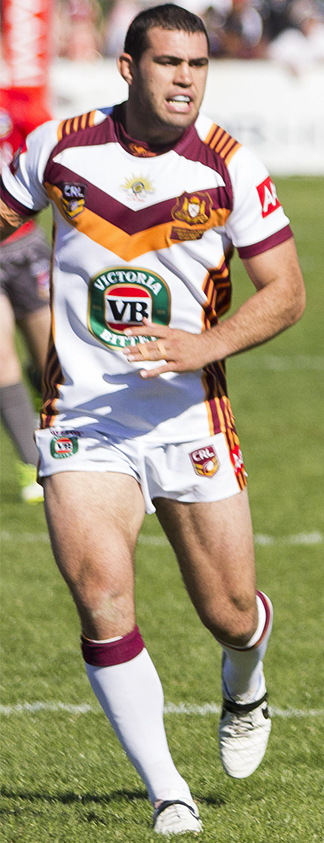

Personal information
- Born: 7 September 1991 (age 35) Bega, New South Wales, Australia

Playing information
- Height: 188 cm (6 ft 2 in)
- Weight: 102 kg (16 st 1 lb)
- Position: Lock
Club
Years	Team	Pld	T	G	FG	P
2012–14	Canterbury Bulldogs	66	2	0	0	8
2015–21	Melbourne Storm	152	15	1	0	62
2022–24	Cronulla Sharks	33	0	0	0	0
	Total	251	17	1	0	70
Representative
Years	Team	Pld	T	G	FG	P
2014–17	NSW Country	4	0	0	0	0
2019–21	New South Wales	5	0	0	0	0

Dale Finucane (born 7 September 1991) is a former Australian professional rugby league footballer who played as a lock forward for the Cronulla-Sutherland Sharks in the National Rugby League (NRL). Finucane is a dual premiership winner 2017 and 2020 with the Melbourne Storm.

Finucane previously played for the Canterbury-Bankstown Bulldogs and Melbourne Storm in the NRL. He has played for the Country Origin and New South Wales sides.

== Early life ==
Finucane was born in Bega, New South Wales, and is of Irish descent.

Finucane played his junior football for the Bega Roosters and studied at Bega High School.

In 2009, he signed with the Canterbury-Bankstown Bulldogs. When signed at Canterbury-Bankstown, he was educated at Bass High School.

== Playing career ==
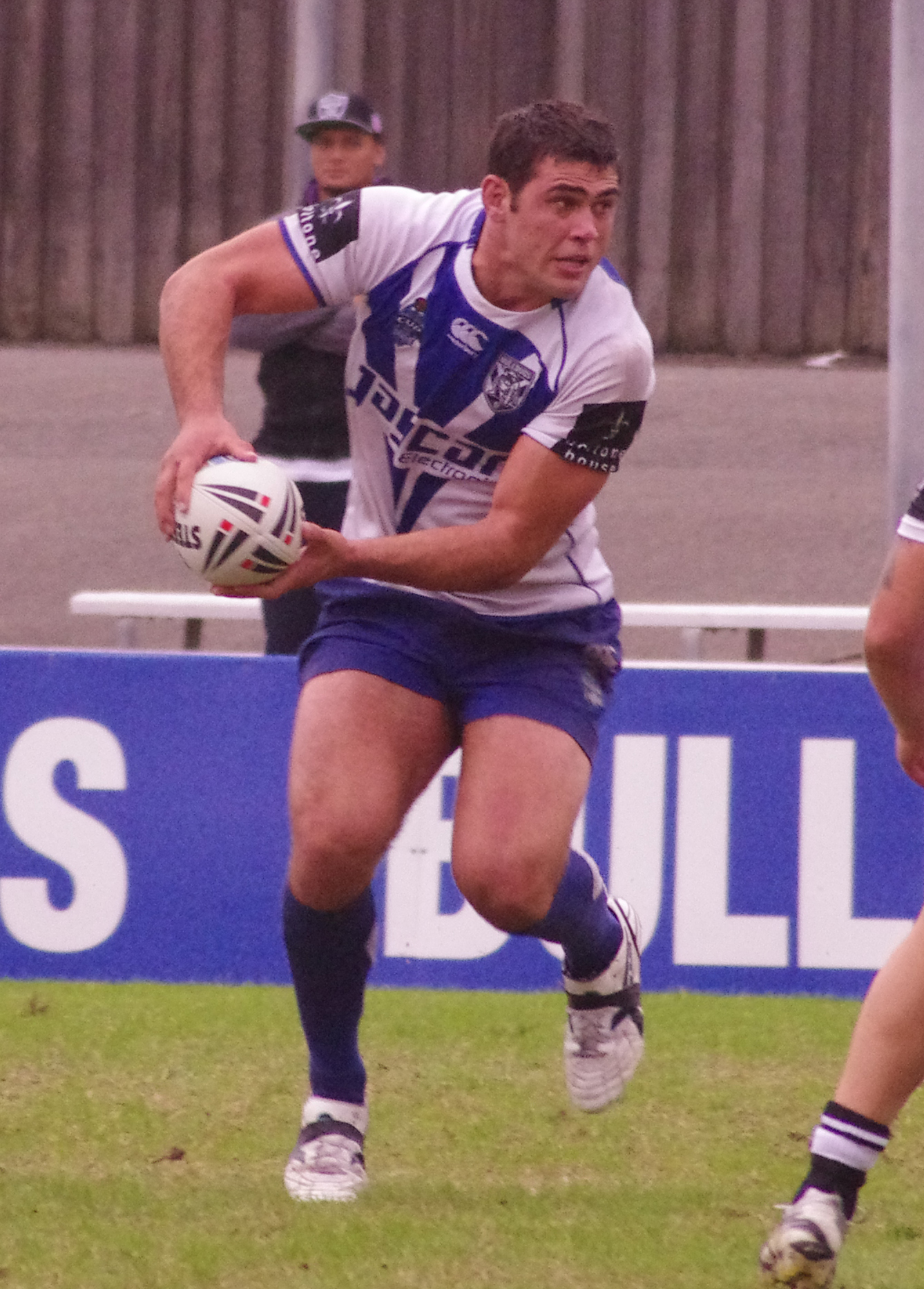
Finucane playing for the Bulldogs in 2012

=== Early career ===
In 2009, Finucane played for the Canterbury-Bankstown Bulldogs' S. G. Ball Cup team, winning the S. G. Ball Cup Player of the Year award and playing for the New South Wales Under 18s team. Later that same year, he moved straight into the Bulldogs' NRL Under-20s team. He played in that competition for the Bulldogs from 2009 to 2011, playing over 60 games. On 31 August 2010, Finucane was named on the interchange bench in the 2010 NRL Under-20s Team of the Year. On 30 August 2011, Finucane was named at prop in the 2011 NRL Under-20s Team of the Year. On 16 October 2011, Finucane played for the Junior Kangaroos against the Junior Kiwis, where he played at lock in the 28-16 loss. In 2012, Finucane moved on to the Bulldogs' New South Wales Cup team.

=== 2012–2014: Canterbury-Bankstown Bulldogs ===
In round 13 of the 2012 NRL season, Finucane made his NRL debut for the Canterbury-Bankstown Bulldogs against the South Sydney Rabbitohs, playing off the interchange bench in the 23–18 win at ANZ Stadium. On 30 September 2012, in the Bulldogs 2012 NRL Grand Final against the Melbourne Storm, Finucane played off the interchange bench in the 14-4 defeat. Finucane finished his debut NRL year with him playing in 14 matches for the Canterbury-Bankstown club in the 2012 NRL season.

In round 20 against the Parramatta Eels, Finucane scored his first NRL career try in Canterbury-Bankstown's 40-12 win at ANZ Stadium. On 11 August 2013, Finucane extended his contract with Canterbury from the end of 2014 to the end of 2016. Finucane finished the 2013 NRL season with him playing all of Canterbury's 25 matches and scoring one try.

In February 2014, Finucane was selected in Canterbury's 2014 NRL Auckland Nines squad. On 4 May 2014, Finucane played for Country Origin against City Origin where he played off the interchange bench in the 26-26 all draw in Dubbo. On 5 October 2014, in Canterbury's 2014 NRL Grand Final against the South Sydney Rabbitohs, Finucane played off the interchange bench in the 32-6 defeat. Finucane finished the 2014 NRL season with him playing in 27 matches and scored 1 try for Canterbury. On 18 December 2014, after gaining a release from his Canterbury contract, Finucane signed a three-year contract with the Melbourne Storm starting in 2015.

=== 2015–2021: Melbourne Storm ===
In round 1 of the 2015 NRL season, Finucane made his club debut for the Melbourne Storm against the St. George Illawarra Dragons, starting at lock in the 12-4 win at Jubilee Oval. On 3 May 2017, Finucane played for Country Origin against City Origin where he started at prop in the 34-22 win in Wagga Wagga. In round 9 against the Parramatta Eels, Finucane scored his first club try for Melbourne in the 28–10 win at Parramatta Stadium. Finucane finished the 2015 NRL season with playing in 23 matches and scoring two tries in his first year with the Melbourne Storm.

In February 2016, Finucane was selected in the Storm’s 2016 NRL Auckland Nines squad. On 8 May 2016, Finucane played for Country Origin against City Origin where he started at lock in the 44-30 loss in Tamworth. On 2 October 2016, in the Storm’s 2016 NRL Grand Final against the Cronulla-Sutherland Sharks, Finucane played in his third grand final, starting at lock and sadly losing another premiership in the 14-12 defeat. Finucane finished the 2016 NRL season with him playing in all of Melbourne's 27 matches and scoring two tries.

On 22 March 2017, Finucane extended his contract with the Melbourne club to the end of the 2021 season. On 7 May 2017, Finucane played for Country Origin against City Origin where he started at prop in the 20-10 loss in Mudgee. On 1 October 2017, in the Storm’s 2017 NRL Grand Final against the North Queensland Cowboys, Finucane appeared in his 4th grand final, starting at lock and scoring a try in the breaking of the hoodoo match with a 34–6 victory. Finucane finished the 2017 NRL season on a high with him playing in 26 matches, scoring four tries and kicking one goal for the Melbourne club.

To start the season, Finucane was part of the successful 2018 World Club Challenge team. In round 12 of the 2018 NRL season against the North Queensland Cowboys, Finucane play his 150th NRL games in the Storms' 7–6 win at 1300SMILES Stadium. September, Finucane played in his fifth grand final and took part in the 2018 NRL Grand Final.

Finucane was called up by New South Wales Blues for the second game of the 2019 State of Origin series. It was his first appearance in the interstate series. He came off the bench as inter-change No. 14. However a late change by coach Brad Fitler saw Finucane start the match at lock in place of Paul Vaughan who dropped to the bench and Jake Trbojevic came into the front row.

At club level, Finucane played 26 games as Melbourne won the minor premiership and were amongst the favourites to take out the title. Finucane played in Melbourne's preliminary final loss to the Sydney Roosters at the Sydney Cricket Ground.

Finucane is a member of Melbourne's 2020 NRL Grand Final team, his second NRL premiership with the club, in his sixth grand final appearance. On 19 February, Finucane and Jesse Bromwich are announced as co-captains of Melbourne, succeeding Cameron Smith. Finucane was named New South Wales Blues vice-captain for 2021 Origin game 3, despite missing the first two games of the 2021 series.

On 25 July, Finucane announced he would join Cronulla-Sutherland Sharks from the 2022 season on a four-year contract. Finucane played 17 games for Melbourne in the 2021 NRL season as the club won 19 matches in a row and claimed the Minor Premiership. Finucane's final match for Melbourne was their upset 10–6 defeat against the Penrith Panthers at Suncorp Stadium in the preliminary final.

=== 2022–2024 Cronulla-Sutherland Sharks ===
In round 1 of the 2022 NRL season, Finucane made his club debut for Cronulla-Sutherland in their 24-19 loss against the Canberra Raiders. In round 10, Finucane was taken from the field during Cronulla's loss to Canberra. Finucane was later ruled out from playing for six weeks with a medial ligament sprain. On 26 July, Finucane was suspended for two matches after using a dangerous high tackle during Cronulla's round 19 loss to the Penrith Panthers. Finucane played a total of 17 games for Cronulla in the 2022 NRL season as the club finished second on the table. Finucane played in both of Cronulla's finals matches as they were eliminated in straight sets. On 25 July 2023, it was announced that Finucane would miss the remainder of the 2023 NRL season with a bicep injury.

In round 3 of the 2024 NRL season, Finucane was taken from the field during Cronulla's upset loss to the Wests Tigers. It was later announced that Finucane would miss up to a month with a fractured eye socket.

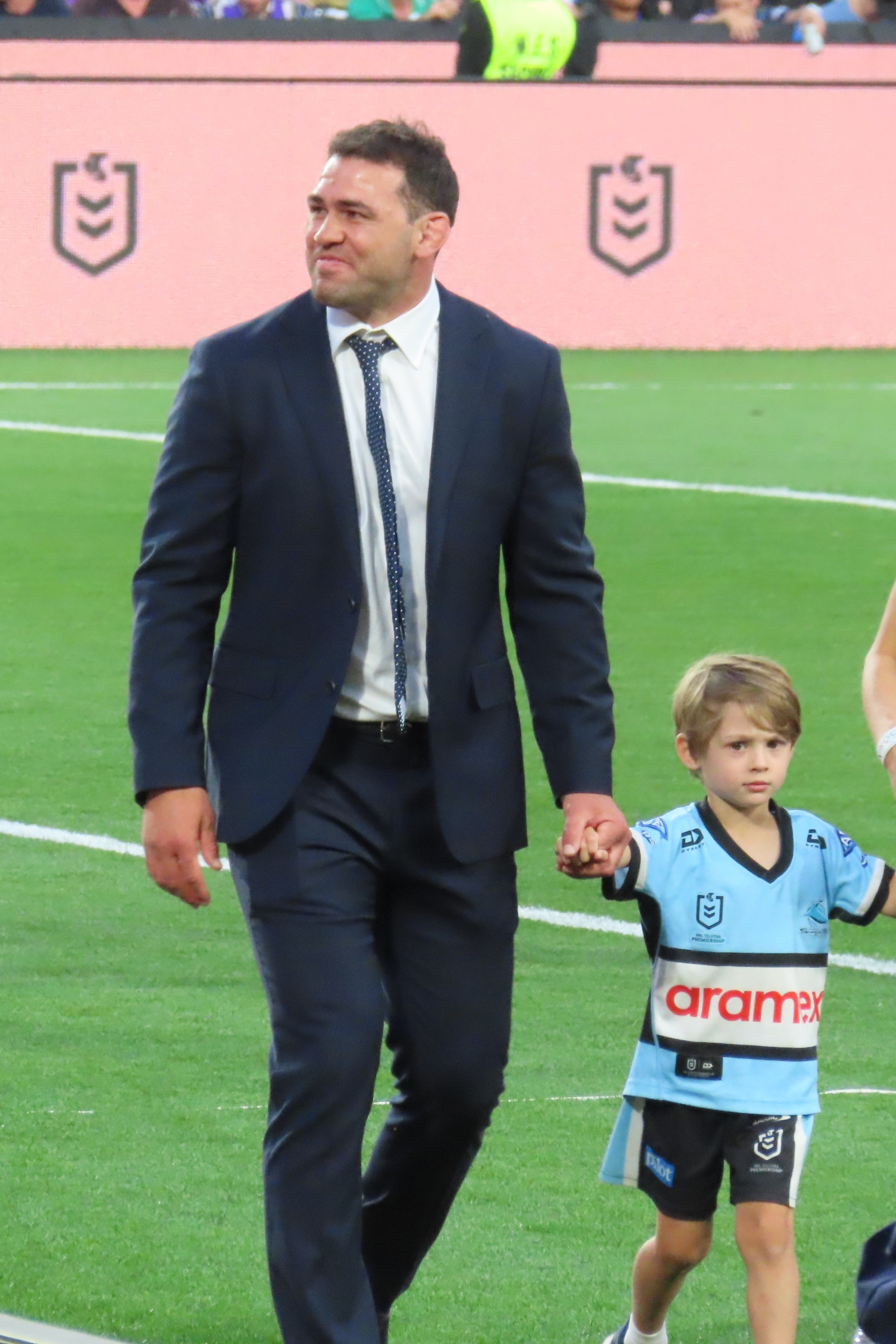
Finucane walked a lap of honour at the 2024 NRL Grand Final.

On 23 April 2024, Finucane announced his immediate retirement from rugby league on medical advice, due to repeated head knocks.

== Honours ==
=== Individual ===
- 2018 – Melbourne Storm: Forward of the Year
- 2019 – Melbourne Storm: Player of the Year
- 2021 – Melbourne Storm: Co Captain

=== Canterbury-Bankstown Bulldogs ===
- 2012 Minor Premiership winners

=== Melbourne Storm ===
- 2016 Minor Premiership Winners
- 2017 NRL Grand Final Winners
- 2017 Minor Premiership Winners
- 2018 World Club Challenge Winners
- 2019 Minor Premiership Winners
- 2020 NRL Grand Final Winners
- 2021 Minor Premiership Winners

== Statistics ==
=== NRL ===
Season	Team	Matches	T	G	GK %	F/G	Pts
2012	Canterbury-Bankstown Bulldogs	14	0	0	—	0	0
2013	Canterbury-Bankstown Bulldogs	25	1	0	—	0	4
2014	Canterbury-Bankstown Bulldogs	27	1	0	—	0	4
2015	Melbourne Storm	23	2	0	—	0	8
2016	Melbourne Storm	27	2	0	—	0	8
2017	Melbourne Storm	26	4	1/1	100.00%	0	18
2018	Melbourne Storm	18	1	0	—	0	4
2019	Melbourne Storm	26	2	0	—	0	8
2020	Melbourne Storm	15	2	0	—	0	8
2021	Melbourne Storm	17	2	0	—	0	8
2022	Cronulla-Sutherland Sharks	17	0	0	—	0	0
2023	Cronulla-Sutherland Sharks	13	0	0	—	0	0
2024	Cronulla-Sutherland Sharks	3	0	0	—	0	0
Career totals		251	17	1/1	100.00%	0	70

=== City vs Country ===
Season	Team	Matches	T	G	GK %	F/G	Pts
2014	NSW Country	1	0	0	—	0	0
2015	NSW Country	1	0	0	—	0	0
2016	NSW Country	1	0	0	—	0	0
2017	NSW Country	1	0	0	—	0	0
Career totals		4	0	0	—	0	0

=== State of Origin ===
Season	Team	Matches	T	G	GK %	F/G	Pts
2019	New South Wales	2	0	0	—	0	0
2020	New South Wales	2	0	0	—	0	0
2021	New South Wales	1	0	0	—	0	0
Career totals		5	0	0	—	0	0
