= Jarrod O'Doherty =

Australian rugby league footballer

Personal information
- Full name: Jarrod O'Doherty
- Born: 16 September 1977 (age 47); Newcastle, New South Wales, Australia

Playing information
- Position: Second-row
Club
Years	Team	Pld	T	G	FG	P
1997–02	Newcastle Knights	28	2	0	0	8
2003	Huddersfield	27	3	0	0	12
	Total	55	5	0	0	20
- Source: As of 7 February 2019

Jarrod O'Doherty (born 16 September 1977) is a former professional rugby league footballer who played in the 1990s and 2000s. He played for the Newcastle Knights from 1997 to 1998 and 2001 to 2002 and finally the Huddersfield Giants in 2003.
