= Group 21 Rugby League =

Local rugby league competition

Group 21 – Hunter Valley Rugby League
- Sport: Rugby league
- Formerly known as: Upper Hunter Football Association
- Instituted: 1920
- Inaugural season: 1897 (Union), 1920 (League)
- Number of teams: 9 (6 in First Grade)
- Country: Australia
- Premiers: Scone Thoroughbreds (2026)
- Most titles: Scone Thoroughbreds (39 titles)
- Website: Group 21
- Broadcast partner: Bar TV Sports (Australia)

Group 21 Rugby League is a local rugby league competition, run under the control of the Country Rugby League. It covers the Upper Hunter area of New South Wales, and has three divisions, first grade, reserves and Under 18s. For sponsorship reasons, it is known as the Bengalla Group 21 Competition.

The Scone Thoroughbreds have won the most titles, winning 39 titles, and are considered one of the most successful country rugby league teams.

In 2006, the Greta-Branxton Colts joined the competition.

== Teams ==
Due to the COVID-19 pandemic in Australia the 2020 season did not commence as originally scheduled and was cancelled in mid-June. The 2021 season was also cancelled mid-season.

Eight clubs contest the competition, with six teams competing in First Grade, seven in Reserve Grade, five in Ladies League Tag and four in Under 18s as of 2023.

Club	Nickname	Home Ground	No. of Premierships	Premiership Years
First Grade Clubs
Aberdeen	Tigers	McKinnon Oval	24	1897–1902, 1904, 1906, 1909, 1911, 1926–27, 1933–34, 1949, 1985, 1987, 1989, 1991–93, 2001, 2010, 2017
Denman	Devils	Denman Oval	11	1936, 1957, 1961–63, 1968, 1975, 1997, 2005, 2013, 2015
Greta-Branxton	Colts	Greta Central Oval	2	2009, 2014
Muswellbrook	Rams	Olympic Park	16	1910, 1913, 1925, 1928, 1935, 1937, 1939, 1953, 1956, 1959–60, 1967, 1983–84, 2002, 2004
Scone	Thoroughbreds	Scone Park	39	1905, 1907–08, 1912, 1914, 1922, 1930–32, 1938, 1940, 1950–52, 1954–55, 1958, 1966, 1969–70, 1972, 1976, 1979, 1988, 1994–96, 1998–2000, 2003, 2006, 2016, 2018–19, 2022–24, 2026
Singleton	Greyhounds	Pirtek Park	11	1947–48, 1971, 1973–74, 1990, 2007–08, 2011–12, 2025
Reserve Grade Clubs
Merriwa	Magpies	Merriwa No.1 Oval	2	1964–65
Murrurundi	Mavericks	Wilson Memorial Oval	6	1903, 1914, 1920–21, 1923–24
Quirindi	Grasshoppers	Longfield Oval	5	1929, 1977–78, 1980–81

Locations of the current Group 21 clubs.

=== Former teams ===
- Muswellbrook Sharks (merged with the Rams)
- Bunnan Bears (1990s, merged with Scone)
- Werris Creek Magpies (1980s, 2 premierships, Group 4)
- Raymond Terrace Magpies (entered competition in 2009, returned to NHRL after)
- Branxton (1 premiership)
- Army (Singleton Army base, 1940s, 1 premiership, also 1952–53 in 2nd Grade)
- Sandy Hollow (1946)
- Singleton St Patrick's (mid 1940s)
- Caroona (1990s)

Lower Grades

- Budgewoi Buff Point Bulldogs (2009, Under 18s only, returned to NHRL)
- Bendemeer (1997, 2nd Division)
- Willow Tree (late 1920s, 2nd Grade)
- Wybong (mid 1930s, 2nd Grade)
- Moonan Flat (mid 1930s, 2nd Grade)
- Jerry's Plains (late 1930s & 1948, 2nd Grade)

== Competition winners ==
=== First Grade Premiers ===
Season	Grand Final Information						Minor Premiers
Season	Premiers	Score	Runners-up	Venue	Report	Coach	Minor Premiers
1920	Murrurundi	13–4	Aberdeen	Scone
1921	Murrurundi	10–5	Scone	Aberdeen
1922	Scone	No Final	Quirindi	Quirindi
1923	Murrurundi	No Final
1924	Murrurundi	No Final
1925	Muswellbrook	10–2	Scone	Scone Park
1926	Aberdeen	11–0	Scone
1927	Aberdeen	32–2	Murrurundi				Aberdeen
1928	Muswellbrook	No Final
1929	Quirindi	No Final
1930	Scone	15–9	Muswellbrook	Aberdeen	SA	Lewis Boyd	Scone
1931	Scone	13–9	Aberdeen	Aberdeen		Lewis Boyd	Scone
1932	Scone	16–8	Aberdeen	Aberdeen		Lewis Boyd	Scone
1933	Aberdeen	15–12	Scone	Scone Park		Jack Coote	Scone
1934	Aberdeen	27–5	Scone	Muswellbrook		R. Jeffree	Aberdeen
1935	Muswellbrook	18–13	Singleton	Hill Street Ground; Muswellbrook		Norman Forbes	Muswellbrook
1936	Denman	20–16	Muswellbrook	Aberdeen		George King	Denman
1937	Muswellbrook	28–5	Singleton	Muswellbrook		Roger Brennan	Muswellbrook
1938	Scone	25–3	Singleton	Muswellbrook		Roy Sneddon	Scone
1939	Muswellbrook	11–2	Aberdeen				Muswellbrook
1940	Scone	3–2	Aberdeen	Town Park; Scone			Scone
1944	Branxton	8–4	St Pats Singleton
1945	Army I.	17–10	St Pats Singleton	St. Patrick's Ground		Jack Chadd	Army I.
1946	St.Pats Singleton	7–5	Scone	St. Patrick's Ground		William Geddes	St.Pats Singleton
1947	Singleton	3–0	Muswellbrook			Alan Reading	Muswellbrook
1948	Singleton	8–8	Aberdeen			William Geddes	Singleton
1949	Aberdeen	28–2	Singleton	Aberdeen		W. Woodward	Aberdeen
1950	Scone	30–0	Muswellbrook	Scone		Bruce Shepherd	Scone
1951	Scone	10–4	Muswellbrook	Aberdeen		Bob Watson	Scone
1952	Scone	10–2	Singleton	Aberdeen		Bob Watson	Scone
1953	Muswellbrook	14–2	Singleton	Aberdeen		Nev. Hogan	Singleton
1954	Scone	22–7	Muswellbrook	Howe Park; Singleton		Harry Melville	Scone
1955	Scone	19–7	Muswellbrook	Scone
1956	Muswellbrook	7–5	Denman
1957	Denman	13–6	Muswellbrook
1958	Scone	13–3	Singleton
1959	Muswellbrook	26–6	Singleton
1960	Muswellbrook	13–5	Merriwa
1961	Denman	7–2	Merriwa	Merriwa
1962	Denman	6–2	Merriwa
1963	Denman	20–13	Singleton	Olympic Park; Muswellbrook
1964	Merriwa	8–5	Denman	Olympic Park; Muswellbrook
1965	Merriwa	23–7	Denman	Olympic Park; Muswellbrook
1966	Scone	12–5	Merriwa	Scone Park
1967	Muswellbrook	6–5	Merriwa	Scone Park
1968	Denman	5–2	Scone	Olympic Park; Muswellbrook
1969	Scone	14–2	Singleton			Don "Bandy" Adams
1970	Scone	19–3	Singleton
1971	Singleton	29–11	Denman			Pat Kelly
1972	Scone	21–9	Singleton	Olympic Park; Muswellbrook
1973	Singleton	17–10	Scone
1974	Singleton	22–17	Scone			Pat Kelly	Muswellbrook
1975	Denman	19–13	Muswellbrook	Denman Sports Ground		J. McDonald
1976	Scone	16–11	Quirindi	Quirindi			Quirindi
1977	Quirindi	13–6	Singleton
1978	Quirindi	30–12	Scone			Bill Monie
1979	Scone	13–12	Muswellbrook	Scone Park		Les Cleal	Scone
1980	Quirindi	29–10	Singleton			Brian Purtell
1981	Quirindi	18–11	Muswellbrook	Olympic Park; Muswellbrook		Brian Purtell
1982	Werris Creek	16–13	Muswellbrook	Taylor Oval; Werris Creek
1983	Muswellbrook	32–22	Scone	Olympic Park; Muswellbrook		Arthur Earl
1984	Muswellbrook	13–12	Denman			Arthur Earl
1985	Aberdeen	4–2	Muswellbrook	Harrison Oval Aberdeen		Wayne Smith
1986	Werris Creek	24–15	Aberdeen	Werris Creek		Mark Gallienne
1987	Aberdeen	24–12	Muswellbrook	Olympic Park; Muswellbrook		Chris Cumming	Muswellbrook
1988	Scone	13–12	Singleton	Scone Park		Les Cleal	Singleton
1989	Aberdeen	21–20	Singleton	Singleton Showground		Chris Cumming
1990	Singleton	22–16	Aberdeen	Singleton Showground		Richard Jones	Singleton
1991	Aberdeen	14–13	Muswellbrook	Olympic Park; Muswellbrook		Troy Logan
1992	Aberdeen	22–12	Muswellbrook	McKinnon Field; Aberdeen		Troy Logan
1993	Aberdeen	14–12	Muswellbrook	McKinnon Field; Aberdeen		Jason Hoogerwerf
1994	Scone	30–18	Aberdeen	McKinnon Field; Aberdeen		Darryl Rando
1995	Scone	20–8	Singleton			Darryl Rando
1996	Scone	27–14	Singleton			Darryl Rando
1997	Denman	34–16	Muswellbrook	Denman Oval		Ben Daniels
1998	Scone	40–2	Denman			Daryl Rando
1999	Scone	36–10	Quirindi			Darryl Rando
2000	Scone	12–2	Aberdeen	McKinnon Field; Aberdeen		Karne Gleeson	Scone
2001	Aberdeen	38–26	Muswellbrook	McKinnon Field; Aberdeen		Mark Feeney
2002	Muswellbrook	32–8	Scone	Olympic Park; Muswellbrook		Barry Edwards
2003	Scone	46–10	Aberdeen	Scone Park		Scott Pennell	Scone
2004	Muswellbrook	34–22	Scone	Olympic Park; Muswellbrook		Barry Edwards	Scone
2005	Denman	28–14	Singleton	Denman Oval		Scott Donnelly	Denman
2006	Scone	26–6	Singleton	Scone Park		John Johnson	Singleton
2007	Singleton	30–14	Aberdeen	Singleton Showground		Mark Newman	Singleton
2008	Singleton	36–10	Greta-Branxton	Resco Park; Singleton		Mark Newman	Singleton
2009	Greta-Branxton	22–16	Singleton	Greta Oval		Matt Lantry	Singleton
2010	Aberdeen	26–24	Denman	McKinnon Field; Aberdeen		Mark Wilton	Scone
2011	Singleton	26–4	Scone	Scone Park		Russell Richards	Singleton
2012	Singleton	26–6	Muswellbrook	Resco Park; Singleton		Mark Newman	Denman
2013	Denman	20–4	Greta-Branxton	Denman Oval		Dean Amos	Greta-Branxton
2014	Greta-Branxton	18–16	Denman	Greta Oval		Ron Griffiths	Scone
2015	Denman	24–20	Scone	Scone Park		Paul Gallagher	Scone
2016	Scone	16–14	Muswellbrook	Olympic Park; Muswellbrook		Daniel Ritter	Scone
2017	Aberdeen	36–26	Muswellbrook			Daniel Hoogerwerf and Shane Hasselmann	Muswellbrook
2018	Scone	10–6	Aberdeen	McKinnon Field; Aberdeen		Aaron Watts	Aberdeen
2019	Scone	40–6	Aberdeen	Scone Park		Aaron Watts	Scone
2020 and 2021 seasons cancelled due to COVID-19 pandemic
2022	Scone	42–6	Denman	Scone Park		Adam Clydsdale	Scone
2023	Scone	30–28	Greta-Branxton	Greta Oval		Blake Johnston	Greta-Branxton
2024	Scone	18–10	Greta-Branxton
2025	Singleton	28–22	Greta-Branxton	Pirtek Park; Singleton		Kerrod Holland	Greta-Branxton
2026	Scone	22-20	Singleton	Scone Park		Mitch Garbutt	Singleton

== Rugby Union ==
A Rugby Union competition ran in the Upper Hunter from 1897 to 1914, and in 1919, as a direct predecessor to the Rugby League competition. Aberdeen, Muswellbrook, Scone and in some years Murrurundi participated. In the early stages Finals appear to be held only when the top two teams were equal on points at the conclusion of the round-robin matches. Union matches were played during the World War One, in the seasons 1915 to 1918, on an irregular and social basis. Singleton played in competitions centred in Maitland..

Season	Premiers	Score	Runners-up	Venue	Report	Minor Premier
1897	Aberdeen					
1898	Aberdeen	16–0	Muswellbrook	Scone	MC	
1899	Aberdeen	No Final			MC	
1900	Aberdeen	3–0	Murrurundi	Muswellbrook	SA	
1901	Aberdeen					
1902	Aberdeen	16–0	Murrurundi	Scone	SA	
1903	Murrurundi	14–0	Aberdeen	Scone	SA	
1904	Aberdeen	No Final			SA	
1905	Scone		Murrurundi		SA	
1906	Aberdeen	No Final			SA	
1907	Scone	No Final			SA	
1908	Scone	3–0	Aberdeen	Muswellbrook Showground	SA	
1909	Aberdeen	6–0	Muswellbrook	Aberdeen	SA	
1910	Muswellbrook				MC	
1911	Aberdeen					
1912	Scone				SA	
1913	Muswellbrook				MC	
1914	Scone	Forfeit	Muswellbrook	Muswellbrook		
1919	Murrurundi	8–0	Muswellbrook	Scone Park	MC	

== Title Tally ==
Club	Premiership Tally			Years	
Club	League 1920–2019, 2022–	Union 1897–1914, 1919	Totals	Union	League
First Grade Clubs
Aberdeen Tigers	14	10	24	1897–1902, 1904, 1906, 1909, 1911	1926–27, 1933–34, 1949, 1985, 1987, 1989, 1991–93, 2001, 2010, 2017
Denman Devils	11	0	11	None	1936, 1957, 1961–63, 1968, 1975, 1997, 2005, 2013, 2015
Greta-Branxton Colts	2	0	2	None	2009, 2014
Muswellbrook Rams	14	2	16	1910, 1913	1925, 1928, 1935, 1937, 1939, 1953, 1956, 1959–60, 1967, 1983–84, 2002, 2004
Scone Thoroughbreds	34	5	39	1905, 1907–08, 1912, 1914	1922, 1930–32, 1938, 1940, 1950–52, 1954–55, 1958, 1966, 1969–70, 1972, 1976, 1979, 1988, 1994–96, 1998–2000, 2003, 2006, 2016, 2018-19, 2022-24, 2026
Singleton Greyhounds	11	0	10	None	1947–48, 1971, 1973–74, 1990, 2007–08, 2011–12, 2025
Lower Grade Clubs
Murrurundi Mavericks	4	2	6	1903, 1914	1920–21, 1923–24
Merriwa Magpies	2	0	2	None	1964–65

== Junior League ==
The following clubs field teams in Group 21 Junior Competitions:

- Aberdeen Tigers
- Denman Devils
- Merriwa Magpies
- Muswellbrook Rams
- Scone Thoroughbreds
- Singleton Greyhounds

== See also ==
- Rugby League Competitions in Australia

== External links and Sources ==
- Group 21 homepage
- Rugby League Week at State Library of NSW Research and Collections
