= Group 19 Rugby League =

Rugby tournament in Australia

- Sport: Rugby league
- Formerly known as: Group 5 Rugby League
- Instituted: 1980
- Inaugural season: 1980
- Number of teams: 12 (8 active)
- Country: Australia
- Premiers: Uralla Tigers (2026)
- Most titles: Warialda Wombats (9 titles)
- Website: Group 19

The New England Group 19 Rugby League competition is a Rugby league competition which is run under the auspices of the NSWRL, which absorbed the NSWCRL in 2019. It is based in the New England region. It was originally called the Group 5 Rugby League Premiership but that competition merged with another local competition to form New England Group 19. The competition is generally played on Sundays throughout the winter months, with strong local rivalries as well as inter – town rivalries.

== History ==
=== Group 5 Rugby League ===
Historically, rugby league in the Northern Tablelands and North West was administered under the Group 5 Rugby League banner.

Group 19 emerged from Group 5 in the early 1980s, and initially featured roughly half of all the clubs from the Northern Tablelands and North West NSW. Group 5 eventually merged into the Group 19 competition after the 1981 season and the league has been known as New England Group 19 ever since.

=== Group 19 Rugby League ===
In the 1980's, Noel Cleal and his brother Les emerged from Warialda to rise to prominence in the NSWRL Premiership. But it was the Armidale clubs who dominated the 80’s with Narwan winning 5 premierships in a row from 1980 to 84.

The early 1990's were dominated by Glen Innes and the two Moree sides, the Boomerangs and Boars, before the Armidale, Warialda and Inverell sides rose to the top of the league in the mid to late 1990's.

Guyra, known as the Super Spuds, won a hat trick of Premierships from 2002-2004. Glen Innes, Tingha and Inverell dominated the late 2000's and early 2010's with the Moree Boomerangs emerging as the dominant side with back-to-back titles in 2013 and 2014.

In just their second season in Group 19 the MacIntyre Warriors claimed the A Grade honours, winning a tight contest over the returning Narwan Eels in 2017. The Eels returned to the competition after several years hiatus due to unruly supporters and unsportsmanlike behaviour.

Unfortunately the MacIntyre Warriors folded in 2018, as a result of many players rejoining the nearby Goondiwindi league side. Their absence paved the way for a return to the premiers circuit for the Moree Boomerangs, a team that wear their indigenous flag themed jerseys with pride.

Ashford folded after the COVID-19 plagued 2021 season, and Moree Boars left the year prior to join Group 4.

The 2023 Under 18's competition was won by the Glen Innes Magpies against Narwan Eels.

== Clubs ==
=== Current clubs in Group 19 ===
The Tooheys New England Group 19 Premiership currently contains eleven clubs, two of which are in Armidale (the Armidale Rams and Narwan Eels), and nine from the surrounding area.

Team	Moniker	Ground	Men's	LLT	Group 5 / 19 Premierships
Barraba	Bulldogs	Barraba Recreation Ground	Yes	Yes	None
Guyra	Super Spuds	Guyra Sports Ground	Yes	Yes	6 (1969, 1988, 2002-04, 2006)
Glen Innes	Magpies	Kerry Meade Park, Glen Innes	Yes	Yes	6 (1959, 1989, 1991, 2008, 2010, 2012)
Inverell	Hawks	Varley Oval, Inverell	Yes	Yes	6 (1975, 1998, 2000, 2011, 2016, 2025)
Moree	Boomerangs	Burt Jovanovich Oval, Moree	Yes	Yes	6 (1992, 1994, 2013-14, 2018-19)
Tingha	Tigers	Tingha Sports Ground	Yes	Yes	1 (2009)
Uralla	Tigers	Woodville Oval, Uralla	Yes	Yes	3 (1985, 1990, 2026)
Warialda	Wombats	Rugby League Park, Warialda	Yes	Yes	13 (1961-65, 1973-74, 1980, 1996, 1999, 2001, 2007, 2024)
In Recess 2026
Armidale	Rams	Harris Park, Armidale	No	No	None
Bingara	Bullets	Bingara Sports Ground	No	No	None
Narwan	Eels	Newling Oval, Armidale	No	No	8 (1980-84, 2005, 2022, 2023)
Walcha	Roos	Walcha Showground, Walcha	No	No	None

=== Former clubs ===
==== Part of Final 2nd Division Season in 2019 ====
- Ashford Roosters (promoted to A Grade 2020-21, then folded)
- Bundarra Bears (promoted to A Grade, then folded)
- Tenterfield Tigers (moved to QRL-administered Border Rugby League)

(Plus Bingara, Bundarra, Guyra, Tingha, Walcha and Warialda who have moved up to the A Grade competition)

==== Other Former Clubs ====
- Armidale Galloping Greens (merged with YCW Armidale)
- Gilgai Wolves (folded)
- Gwydir Gumbies (demerged to re-form separate Bingara and Warialda clubs)
- Goondiwindi Boars (Toowoomba Rugby League)
- MacIntyre Warriors (Boggabilla, Border Rugby League)
- Moree Boars (Group 4)
- Uralla-Walcha TigerRoos (demerged to re-form separate Uralla and Walcha clubs)
- Wright College Redmen Armidale (folded)
- YCW Armidale (merged with Armidale Galloping Greens)

== Champions ==
Group 19 Rugby League Champions

Season	Champions	Score	Runners-up
1980	Narwan	23-12	Armidale
1981	Narwan	23–8	Wright College Armidale
1982	Narwan	20–17	Glen Innes
1983	Narwan	16–12	Walcha
1984	Narwan	50–12	Guyra
1985	Uralla	20–4	Glen Innes
1986	YCW Armidale	4–0	Guyra
1987	YCW Armidale	20–18	Uralla
1988	Guyra	36–18	Tingha
1989	Glen Innes	35–6	Armidale
1990	Uralla	12–4	Glen Innes
1991	Glen Innes	28–12	Tingha
1992	Moree Boomerangs	26–18	Glen Innes
1993	Moree Boars	22–20	Armidale
1994	Moree Boomerangs	30–20	Inverell RSM
1995	Armidale	36–28	Glen Innes
1996	Warialda	36–20	Inverell RSM
1997	Armidale	34–24	Guyra
1998	Inverell RSM	28–14	Armidale
1999	Warialda	22–20	Inverell RSM
2000	Inverell RSM	24–12	Glen Innes
2001	Warialda	50–14	Guyra
2002	Guyra	56–24	Narwan
2003	Guyra	44–36	Narwan
2004	Guyra	46–22	Narwan
2005	Narwan	35–22	Guyra
2006	Guyra	28–8	Inverell RSM
2007	Warialda	38–24	Guyra
2008	Glen Innes	26–10	Tingha
2009	Tingha	46–14	Guyra
2010	Glen Innes	14–4	Guyra
2011	Inverell RSM	33–26	Glen Innes
2012	Glen Innes	60–12	Guyra
2013	Moree Boomerangs	48–22	Gwydir
2014	Moree Boomerangs	56–18	Inverell RSM
2015	Inverell RSM	26–24	Moree Boomerangs
2016	Inverell RSM	42–28	MacIntyre
2017	MacIntyre	26–22	Narwan
2018	Moree Boomerangs	36–28	Glen Innes
2019	Moree Boomerangs	36–34	Glen Innes
2020 and 2021 seasons cancelled due to COVID-19 pandemic
2022	Narwan	22–20	Moree Boomerangs
2023	Narwan	36–22	Inverell RSM
2024	Warialda	60–32	Inverell RSM
2025	Inverell RSM	22–12	Tingha
2026	Uralla	25–24	Inverell RSM

== Group 5 Rugby League ==
The competition in the area was previously known as Group 5. Once the Group 19 name became available after the demise of the previous competitions of that name, a breakaway competition from Group 5 became known as New England Group 19. Group 5 merged into this league two years later. The 'Moree' listed is the predecessor of the Moree Boars.

Group 5 Rugby League Champions

Season	Champions	Score	Runners-up
1957	Walcha	11-9	Inverell RSM
1958	Walcha	13-9	Moree
1959	Glen Innes	8-2	Moree
1960	Moree	11-2	Armidale
1961	Warialda	22–8	Moree
1962	Warialda	17–6	Armidale
1963	Warialda	16–11	Guyra
1964	Warialda	21–2	Guyra
1965	Warialda	28–9	Armidale
1966	Armidale	15–10	Warialda
1967	Armidale	7–6	Glen Innes
1968	Moree Mission Jets	9–4	Armidale
1969	Guyra	20–7	Warialda
1970	Armidale	13–3	Glen Innes
1971	Armidale	4–2	Guyra
1972	Moree	11–7	Inverell RSM
1973	Warialda	36–7	Inverell RSM
1974	Warialda	17–8	Glen Innes
1975	Inverell RSM	9–8	Moree
1976	Armidale	12–11	Moree
1977	Moree	18–13	Inverell RSM
1978	Moree	37–10	Glen Innes
1979	Moree	12–5	Glen Innes
1980	Warialda	14–9	Glen Innes
1981	Moree	30–13	Inverell RSM

== Group 19 Junior League ==
=== Current Teams ===
- Armidale Rams
- Tingha Tigers
- Glen Innes Magpies
- Guyra Superspuds
- Inverell Hawks
- Moree Boars (Seniors: Group 4)
- Warialda Wombats

== See also ==
- Rugby League Competitions in Australia
