= Group 4 Rugby League =

Sporting competition in Australia

- Sport: Rugby league
- Instituted: 1913
- Inaugural season: 1913
- Number of teams: 9
- Country: Australia
- Premiers: Gunnedah Bulldogs (2026)
- Most titles: West Tamworth Robins/Lions (29 titles)
- Website: Group 4

Group 4 is a rugby league competition in the New England and north west area of New South Wales, run under the auspices of the Country Rugby League.

== Structure ==
The Group runs a first grade, reserve grade, league tag and under 18s competitions. All nine first grade clubs run at least one lower grade team and most will have three or four. In addition to the nine first grade clubs, there was also one junior club involved in under 16s: Farrer MAHS. The Under 16s competition has since become a part of the junior league organisation in the region, Group 4 JRL. It also formerly ran a second division competition called the Wests Shield. The second division competition contained stand-alone senior teams from smaller towns within the region, who eventually moved up to first grade in 2018 after a merger between the divisions. Kootingal-Moonbi, Dungowan and Boggabri moved up to being full first grade teams, whilst Manilla and Barraba moved into the reserves competition. Manilla then re-joined the first grade competition in 2022.

There are also Group 4 senior Under 18s and Under 16s representative teams that competes against other Group sides. They compete against Groups 19 and 21 in trials for the Greater Northern Tigers regional team.

== Teams ==
=== Current teams ===
Nine teams currently compete in Group 4 Rugby League first grade, from towns across the New England and north west area of New South Wales.

The 2020 season was postponed and subsequently cancelled due to the COVID-19 pandemic in Australia.

First Grade Clubs

Team	Home ground	No. of Premierships	Premierships
Boggabri Kangaroos	Jubilee Oval	2	1963, 1964
Dungowan Cowboys	Dungowan Oval	0	None
Gunnedah Bulldogs	Kitchener Park	8	1956, 1965, 1973, 1983, 1984, 1985, 1998, 2026
Kootingal-Moonbi Roosters	Kootingal Oval	0	None
Moree Boars	Boughton Oval	5	1988, 1989, 1999, 2002, 2024, 2025
Narrabri Blues (in recess)	Collins Park	5	1940, 1970, 1971, 1976, 1990
North Tamworth Bears	Jack Woolaston Oval	23	1913, 1921, 1924, 1926, 1927, 1929, 1931, 1950, 1951, 1953, 1980, 2005, 2006, 2007, 2008, 2014, 2015 2016, 2017, 2018, 2019, 2022, 2023
Wee Waa Panthers	Cook Oval	2	1992, 2004
Werris Creek Magpies	David Taylor Oval	10	1925, 1933, 1948, 1949, 1952, 1979, 1993, 1995, 1996, 1997

== Former teams ==
The following teams have competed in Group 4 First Grade since 1983:

- Armidale (2016) (moved back to Group 19)
- Barraba (1980s–2021, on and off) (folded)
- Bendemeer (2018) (folded)
- Collegians Tamworth (2017) (Returned to junior football only)
- Coonabarabran (1998–2009) (moved to Castlereagh)
- Inverell (1980s–1989) (moved to Group 19)
- Moree Boomerangs (1980s–1990) (moved to Group 19)
- Manilla Tigers (–2022) (folded)
- Oxley Diggers Tamworth (2014–16) (folded)
- Tamworth City (1956–1995, merged with West Tamworth)
- Tamworth United (1990–91)
- Warialda (1980s–1988) (moved to Group 19)
- West Tamworth (1913–1995 as the Robins, merged with Tamworth City 1995–2016), rebranded as South West (2017).

Many of these clubs have moved to Group 19.

These clubs fielded teams in at least one Division 2 competition during the seasons 2011 to 2017.

- Bendemeer (folded)
- Bingara (Group 19)
- Bundarra (moved to Group 19, in recess)
- Quirindi (moved to Group 21, Folded)
- Uralla (moved to Group 19, amalgamated with Walcha)
- Walcha (moved to Group 19, amalgamated with Uralla)

In 2018, the clubs Bendemeer, Boggabri, Dungowan, Kootingal-Moonbi and Werris Creek were elevated from Division 2 into a reorganised First Grade competition. Manilla moved into the lower grades.

== Map ==
Local Area	in New South Wales
Locations of the current Group 4 clubs.	Relation to state & national capitals

== Grand finals ==
Year	Premiers	Score	Runners-up	Report	Winning Coach	Grand Final venue	Minor Premiers	Wooden Spoon
1912	East Tamworth	10–4	North Tamworth Rebels			Outer Oval, Tamworth		
1913	North Tamworth Rebels	-	East Tamworth		Paddy McGuinness	No Final		
1914	West Tamworth	12–3	North Tamworth Rebels					
1915	West Tamworth	-	East Tamworth					
1919	East Tamworth	24–0	North Tamworth			Tamworth Oval		
1920	West Tamworth	8–3	North Tamworth			Tamworth Oval		
1921	North Tamworth	5–4	West Tamworth		E. (LEG) Frame			
1922	West Tamworth	7–6	North Tamworth					
1923	West Tamworth	7–0	North Tamworth					
1924	North Tamworth	-	No Final		Tom McCormack	No Final		
1925	Werris Creek	-	No Final		Alec Main	No Final		
1926	North Tamworth	10–3	Manilla		Harry Pinkerton	Tamworth Oval		
1927	North Tamworth	8–4	West Tamworth		Harry Pinkerton			
1928	West Tamworth	10–3	East Tamworth					
1929	North Tamworth	-	No Final		Harry Pinkerton	No Final		
1930	Nundle	8–5	North Tamworth					
1931	North Tamworth	9–0	East Tamworth		Harry Thompson	Tamworth Oval		West Tamworth
1932	East Tamworth	8–5	West Tamworth		Jim Tait			
1933	Werris Creek	8–7	East Tamworth		Benny Bell			
1934	East Tamworth	20–15	West Tamworth		Cec Anderton			
1935	Cup & Shield Games Only							
1936	Cup & Shield Games Only							
1937	West Tamworth	13–5	Werris Creek					
1938	West Tamworth	8–5	Tamworth					
1939	Tamworth	-	No Final			No Final		
1940	Narrabri Blues	31–7	Tamworth			Collins Park; Narrabri	Narrabri Blues	
1941	Tamworth	7–4	Army					
1942	Tamworth	17–15	RAAF All Blues					
1943	Con Depot	17–10	Tamworth					
1944	Tamworth	6–3	Railways					
1945	Railways	17–11	Werris Creek					
1946	Tamworth	13–3	Quirindi					
1947	Quirindi	19–6	East Tamworth					
1948	Werris Creek	14–7	East Tamworth		Eric Frazer		Werris Creek	
1949	Werris Creek	18–11	West Tamworth		Eric Frazer		Werris Creek	
1950	North Tamworth Bears	10–2	Werris Creek		Allan Nelson			
1951	North Tamworth	13–2	Werris Creek		Vic Williams			
1952	Werris Creek	11–9	North Tamworth		Greg Wilkins		Werris Creek	
1953	North Tamworth	23–5	Gunnedah		Lloyd Russell		North Tamworth Bears	
1954	Armidale	24–12	West Tamworth		Ron Madden	Tamworth Oval	Armidale	
1955	West Tamworth	16–7	Armidale					
1956	Gunnedah	23–5	Armidale					
1957	West Tamworth	21–7	Boggabri					
1958	Tamworth City RSL	16–12	Boggabri					
1959	Tamworth City RSL	24–2	West Tamworth					
1960	Tamworth City RSL	13–8	West Tamworth					
1961	Manilla	10–8	Gunnedah					
1962	West Tamworth	22–7	Gunnedah					
1963	Boggabri	22–10	West Tamworth					
1964	Boggabri	18–17	West Tamworth					
1965	Gunnedah	29–4	Quirindi					
1966	West Tamworth	11–9	Gunnedah					
1967	West Tamworth	25–13	Manilla					
1968	West Tamworth	26–12	Narrabri Blues					
1969	West Tamworth	5–2	Gunnedah		Wiliam Bischoff			
1970	Narrabri Blues	32–9	West Tamworth					
1971	Narrabri Blues	8–7	West Tamworth					
1972	West Tamworth	22–14	Gunnedah Bulldogs		Wiliam Bischoff			
1973	Gunnedah Bulldogs	25–5	West Tamworth					
1974	West Tamworth	21–8	Werris Creek		Des Kimmorley			
1975	Walcha Roos	12–4	Werris Creek		Marty Williamson		Walcha Roos	
1976	Narrabri Blues	18–5	West Tamworth		Frank Fish			
1977	West Tamworth	34–0	Narrabri Blues					
1978	Tamworth City RSL Lions	15–7	Gunnedah Bulldogs		Dempsey Joy			
1979	Werris Creek	21–3	Gunnedah Bulldogs		Wiliam Bischoff	David Taylor Park; Werris Creek	Werris Creek	
1980	North Tamworth Bears	23–15	Narrabri Blues		Russell Worth		North Tamworth Bears	Wee Waa Panthers
1981	West Tamworth	22–16	Werris Creek			Scully Park	North Tamworth Bears	
1982	Tamworth City RSL Lions	21–2	Moree Boomerangs		Neville Baldock			
1983	Gunnedah Bulldogs	26–22	Tamworth City RSL Lions		Terry Donnelly			
1984	Gunnedah Bulldogs	35–20	North Tamworth Bears		John Lennan			
1985	Gunnedah Bulldogs	19–12	Narrabri Blues		John Lennan	Kitchener Park; Gunnedah	Gunnedah Bulldogs	Boggabri Kangaroos
1986	West Tamworth	6–4	Inverell RSM		Steve Martin	Scully Park	West Tamworth	Moree Boars
1987	West Tamworth	10–0	Gunnedah Bulldogs		Steve Martin	Scully Park	West Tamworth	Wee Waa Panthers
1988	Moree Boars	32–28	Gunnedah Bulldogs		John Kirkwood	Burt Jovanovich Park	Gunnedah Bulldogs	Warialda Wombats
1989	Moree Boars	16–15	Narrabri Blues		John Kirkwood	Burt Jovanovich Park	Moree Boars	Inverell RSM
1990	Narrabri Blues	18–14	West Tamworth		Kevin Hill	Collins Park; Narrabri	Narrabri Blues	Tamworth United
1991	West Tamworth	21–6	Narrabri Blues		Gary Maguire	Scully Park	Narrabri Blues	Tamworth United
1992	Wee Waa Panthers	18–12	West Tamworth		John Harvey	Cook Oval; Wee Waa		
1993	Werris Creek	20–16	Gunnedah Bulldogs		Ron Dellar	David Taylor Park; Werris Creek		
1994	Tamworth City RSL Lions	24–14	Gunnedah Bulldogs		Mick Schmiedel	Kitchener Park		
1995	Werris Creek	16–14	Gunnedah Bulldogs		Ron Dellar		Gunnedah Bulldogs	
1996	Werris Creek	45–14	Gunnedah Bulldogs		Ron Dellar		Werris Creek	
1997	Werris Creek	32–32; Replay; 22-21	Wee Waa Panthers		Ron Dellar		Gunnedah Bulldogs	Moree Boars
1998	Gunnedah Bulldogs	33–14	Wee Waa Panthers		Peter Ryman		Wee Waa Panthers	North Tamworth Bears
1999	Moree Boars	32–20	West Tamworth Lions		Mark Ryan		West Tamworth Lions	Coonabarabran Unicorns
2000	West Tamworth Lions	23–6	North Tamworth Bears		Tony La Chiusa	Jack Woolaston Oval	West Tamworth Lions	Gunnedah Bulldogs
2001	West Tamworth Lions	34–24	North Tamworth Bears		Tony La Chiusa	Scully Park	West Tamworth Lions	Gunnedah Bulldogs
2002	Moree Boars	34–18	West Tamworth Lions		Tony Murray	Burt Jovanovich Oval, Moree	Moree Boars	Wee Waa Panthers
2003	Coonabarabran Unicorns	33–24	North Tamworth Bears		Mark Watton	Jack Woolaston Oval	North Tamworth Bears	Werris Creek
2004	Wee Waa Panthers	46–10	Moree Boars		Matt Hogan	Cook Oval, Wee Waa	West Tamworth Lions	Werris Creek
2005	North Tamworth Bears	34–28	West Tamworth Lions		Luke Taylor	Jack Woolaston Oval	North Tamworth Bears	Wee Waa Panthers
2006	North Tamworth Bears	42–14	Coonabarabran Unicorns		Luke Taylor	Jack Woolaston Oval	North Tamworth Bears	Narrabri Blues
2007	North Tamworth Bears	32–12	West Tamworth Lions		Matt Parsons	Jack Woolaston Oval	North Tamworth Bears	Werris Creek
2008	North Tamworth Bears	8–6	West Tamworth Lions		Matt Parsons	Jack Woolaston Oval	West Tamworth Lions	Narrabri Blues
2009	West Tamworth Lions	52–28	North Tamworth Bears		Tony La Chiusa	Scully Park	West Tamworth Lions	Narrabri Blues
2010	West Tamworth Lions	55–12	Wee Waa Panthers		Tony La Chiusa	Scully Park	West Tamworth Lions	Moree Boars
2011	West Tamworth Lions	54–14	North Tamworth Bears		Tony La Chiusa	Jack Woolaston Oval	West Tamworth Lions	Moree Boars
2012	West Tamworth Lions	23–12	North Tamworth Bears		Tony La Chiusa	Jack Woolaston Oval	West Tamworth Lions	Moree Boars
2013	West Tamworth Lions	33–24	North Tamworth Bears		Tony La Chiusa	Scully Park	West Tamworth Lions	Moree Boars
2014	North Tamworth Bears	56–18	Gunnedah Bulldogs		Brad McManus	Jack Woolaston Oval	North Tamworth Bears	Oxley Diggers
2015	North Tamworth Bears	46–25	West Tamworth Lions		Zac Russ	Jack Woolaston Oval	West Tamworth Lions	Oxley Diggers
2016	North Tamworth Bears	36–12	West Tamworth Lions		Brad McManus	Jack Woolaston Oval	North Tamworth Bears	Armidale Rams
2017	North Tamworth Bears	30–22	Narrabri Blues		Brad McManus	Jack Woolaston Oval	North Tamworth Bears	Wee Waa Panthers
2018	North Tamworth Bears	34–28	Gunnedah Bulldogs		Scott Blanch	Jack Woolaston Oval	Kootingal Moonbi Roosters	Boggabri Kangaroos
2019	North Tamworth Bears	40–4	Kootingal Moonbi Roosters		Scott Blanch	Jack Woolaston Oval	North Tamworth Bears	Boggabri Kangaroos
2020 and 2021 seasons cancelled due to COVID-19 pandemic.
2022	North Tamworth Bears	22–14	Dungowan Cowboys		Paul Boyce	Dungowan Recreation Reserve	North Tamworth Bears	Manilla Tigers
2023	North Tamworth Bears	26–16	Moree Boars		Paul Boyce	Jack Woolaston Oval	Moree Boars	Narrabri Blues
2024	Moree Boars	40–18	Boggabri		Michael Watton	Boughton Oval	Moree Boars	Wee Waa Panthers
2025	Moree Boars	32–16	Gunnedah Bulldogs			Boughton Oval	Moree Boars	Wee Waa Panthers
2026	Gunnedah Bulldogs	28–12	Moree Boars		Sean Hayne	Kitchener Park	Moree Boars	Kootingal Moonbi Roosters

== Junior League ==
=== Current Teams ===
Team	Home ground
Dungowan Cowboys	Dungowan Oval
Farrer Memorial AHS	Farrer HS
Gunnedah Bulldogs	Kitchener Park
Kootingal-Moonbi Roosters	Kootingal Oval
Manilla Tigers	Manilla Oval
Collegians Tamworth JRLFC	Tamworth
Narrabri Blues	Collins Park
North Tamworth Bears	Jack Woolaston Oval
South West Robins Junior Sporting Assoc.	Scully Park Precinct
Werris Creek Magpies	David Taylor Oval

== Notable juniors ==
=== Gunnedah Bulldogs ===
- John Donnelly
- James Wynne
- John O’Neill
- Lindsay Johnston
- Ron Turner
- Aaron Donnelly

== See also ==
- Rugby League Competitions in Australia

== External links and sources ==
- Country Rugby League official site
- Group 4 on SportsTG
- Rugby League Week at State Library of NSW Research and Collections
