= Group 19 Rugby League (1974–1979) =

The Group 19 Rugby League (1974–1979) was a rugby league competition, held in the area around Canberra, the broader Australian Capital Territory and Southern New South Wales. The competition merged with Group 8 in 1979 to form the ACTRL and Canberra District Rugby League, which again combined to form the Canberra Division system in 1982.

The Canberra Rugby League considers the competition part of its history.

== Former clubs ==
| Club | Moniker | Years | Premierships |
|---|---|---|---|
| Batemans Bay | Tigers | | None |
| Belconnen United | Panthers | 1974–79 | 1975, 1976, 1977, 1978, 1979 |
| Canberra | Gallopers | 1974–79 | None |
| Lakes United | Sharks | | None |
| North Canberra | Bears | 1974–79 | 1974 |
| South Woden | Saints | 1974–79 | None |
| West Belconnen | Warriors | | None |
| Weston Creek | Rabbitohs | 1978–81 | None |

== Group 19 Premiers ==
=== Group 19 First Grade Premiers ===
| Year | Winner | Score | Loser | Referee | Venue | Date | Source |
Group 19 Premiership
| 1974 | North Canberra Bears | 12 – 9 | Batemans Bay Tigers | B. Foran | Manuka Oval; Canberra | 8 September 1974 | CT |
| 1975 | Belconnen United Panthers | 17 – 11 | South Woden Saints | N. Bissett | Manuka Oval; Canberra | 14 September 1975 | CT |
| 1976 | Belconnen United Panthers (2) | 22 – 5 | West Belconnen Warriors | N. Bissett | Northbourne Oval; Canberra | 29 August 1976 | CT |
| 1977 | Belconnen United Panthers (3) | 24 – 14 | West Belconnen Warriors | B. Foran | Manuka Oval; Canberra | 4 September 1977 | CT |
| 1978 | Belconnen United Panthers (4) | 22 – 13 | Lakes United Sharks | N. Bissett | Northbourne Oval; Canberra | 3 September 1978 | CT |
| 1979 | Belconnen United Panthers (5) | 20 – 18 | Canberra Gallopers | K. Pickard | Northbourne Oval; Canberra | 23 September 1979 | CT |

=== Group 19 Reserve Grade Premiers ===
| Year | Winner | Score | Loser | Referee | Venue | Date | Source |
|---|---|---|---|---|---|---|---|
| 1974 | South Woden Saints | 16 – 10 | North Canberra Bears | | Manuka Oval Canberra | 8 September 1974 | |
| 1975 | South Woden Saints (2) | 18 – 13 | Lakes United Sharks | | Manuka Oval Canberra | 14 September 1975 | |
| 1976 | Lakes United Sharks | 22 – 7 | Belconnen United Panthers | | Northbourne Oval Canberra | 29 August 1976 | |
| 1977 | Lakes United Sharks (2) | 8 – 7 | Weston Creek | | Manuka Oval Canberra | 4 September 1977 | |
| 1978 | Belconnen United Panthers | 12 – 8 | Lakes United Sharks | | Northbourne Oval Canberra | 3 September 1978 | |
| 1979 | Canberra Gallopers | 22 – 3 | South Woden Saints | | Northbourne Oval Canberra | 23 September 1979 | |

=== Group 19 Under 18s Premiers ===
| Year | Winner | Score | Loser | Referee | Venue | Date | Source |
Group 19 Under 18's
| 1975 | Lakes United Sharks | 5 – 3 | Belconnen United Panthers | | Manuka Oval Canberra | 14 September 1975 | |
| 1976 | Lakes United Sharks (2) | 26 – 2 | Batemans Bay Tigers | | Northbourne Oval Canberra | 29 August 1976 | |
| 1977 | Lakes United Sharks (3) | 26 – 3 | North Canberra Bears | | Manuka Oval Canberra | 4 September 1977 | |
| 1979 | Belconnen United Panthers | 24 – 5 | Canberra Gallopers | | Northbourne Oval Canberra | 23 September 1979 | |
