= Central Coast Division Rugby League =

Rugby league competition

Rugby League Central Coast
- Sport: Rugby league
- Formerly known as: Group 12 Rugby League (1967-80), Central Coast Division Rugby League (1981-2023)
- Instituted: 1947
- Inaugural season: 1967 (as Group 12 Rugby League); 1981 (as Central Coast Rugby League)
- Number of teams: 14 (9 in First Grade)
- Country: Australia
- Premiers: Kincumber Colts (2025)
- Most titles: Wyong Roos (20 titles)

Rugby League Central Coast is a rugby league competition based on the Central Coast of New South Wales between Sydney and Newcastle. The competition was founded in 1947 as a junior competition for the Newcastle club, Lakes United. The competition rapidly expanded and grew, so much so that in 1967, it was upgraded to full membership of the Country Rugby League as Group 12. In 1981, it was upgraded and renamed Central Coast Division. The division covers the entire region of the Central Coast from Woy Woy and Umina in the south up to Budgewoi and Gwandalan in the north. In 2023, CCDRL and CCDJRL merged under one banner to become Rugby League Central Coast. Senior Competition - RLCC, Junior Competition - RLCCJ

== Current clubs ==
| Club | | 2025 | | First Grade Years & Premierships | | | | | Other Senior Competitions |
| Name | Est | Jnr | Snr | Span | 1915–1936 | 1947–2026 | Other | Total | Span |
Senior clubs
| Berkeley Vale Panthers | 1987 | Yes | 1st | 1995–2001, 2003–present | – | 2 | – | 2 | 2nd Division 1987–1994, 2nd Grade 2002; Sydney Women 2015-now |
| Erina Eagles | 1949 | Yes | 1st | 1949–present (Predecessor 1915, 1919–26, 1930–34, 1936) | 2 | 5 | 0 | 7 | Jim Beam Cup 2003–2008 |
| Kincumber Colts | 1978 | Yes | 1st | 2004–present (Predecessor 1932–36) | 0 | 2 | – | 2 | 2nd Division 1978–2000; U17 2003 |
| Terrigal Sharks | 1975 | Yes | 1st | 1976–present (Predecessor 1921) | 0 | 2 | – | 2 | Predecessor 2nd Grade 1931–1932 |
| The Entrance Tigers | 1934 | Yes | 1st | 1947–present | – | 15 | 3 | 18 | Challenge Cups 1930s; Jim Beam Cup 2003–2007, Ron Massey Cup 2010–2014 |
| Toukley Hawks | 1976 | Yes | 1st | 1979–1994, 2006–2017, 2021–present | – | 2 | – | 2 | 2nd Division 1976–1978, 1995–2005. |
| Woy Woy Roosters | 1915 | Yes | 1st | 1947–present (Predecessor 1930–1934) | 0 | 18 | 0 | 18 | Challenge Cups 1935–1941; Jim Beam Cup 2003–2004 |
| Wyong Roos | 1910 | Yes | 1st | 1915, 1919–1924, 1926–1936, 1947–1957, 1960–2006, 2013–present | 7 | 14 | 1 | 21 | Newcastle: 2nd Grade 1912–1914, 3rd Grade 1945, Southern 1946, 1st Grade 2003–2012; NSW Cup 2013–2017 |
| Ourimbah Wyoming Magpies | 1913 | Yes | 1st | 1915, 1919–1936, 1947–2019 | 4 | 8 | 0 | 12 | Challenge Cups 1938–1941, 1946; Jim Beam Cup 2003–2005 |
| Budgewoi-Buff Point Bulldogs | 1978 | Yes | 3rd | Nil | – | – | – | – | 2nd Division 1978–2002, 2005; 2nd Grade 2006 |
| Gosford Kariong Storm | 2000 | Yes | 3rd | (Predecessors 1919–1934, 1936, 1948–1999) | 3 | 7 | 0 | 10 | 2nd Division 2000–2005; 2nd Grade 2006; Open Age 2010–2011, 2014, 2016, 2018. Predecessor North Sydney 1928 |
| Northern Lakes Warriors | 1976 | Yes | 3rd | 1981–1982, 1992–1993 (as Munmorah), 1994–1997, 2004–2017. 2019 | – | 0 | – | 0 | 2nd Division 1976–1980, 1983–1990 (as Munmorah), 2000–2003, 2nd Grade 1991, U18 1999, 2nd Grade 2018. |
| St Edwards Bears (Gosford) | 2013 | Yes | 3rd | Nil | – | – | – | – | U16 1971–1972, 1974; Open Age 2013–present |
| Umina Beach Bunnies | 1964 | Yes | 3rd | 1964–1995, 1999–2002, 2004–2015 | – | 3 | – | 3 | Newcastle & Hunter A Grade 2017, Ladies League Tag 2016–2017 |
Junior-only clubs
| Blue Haven Raiders | 2007 | Yes | No | Nil | – | – | – | – | Open Age 2011 |
| Warnervale Bulls | 2010 | Yes | No | Nil | – | – | – | – | Nil |

=== Teams timeline ===
This timeline indicates the highest grade played.

=== Team numbers ===
View source data.

Team numbers obtained and compiled from results published in the newspapers, Central Coast Express, Wyong Shire Advocate and Central Coast Express Advocate.

== Previous teams ==
=== First grade ===
Current clubs Ourimbah, Wyong and later Woy Woy participated in the Central Coast Rugby League competitions that were held in 1915 and between 1919 and 1936. Teams from Gosford, Erina, Kincumber and Terrigal also competed, predecessors to the current clubs. The following teams were also involved:

- Matcham (1915)
- the Yarramalong Bunyips (1917–1923)
- Jilliby (1919–1921)
- Narara (1920, 1923)
- Dora Creek (1921, 1926–1928, 1931–1932)
- Gosford Light Horse (1925)
- Mooney (1926)
- Wyong Creek (1928)
- Tuggerah Kings (1930–1932)
- Morisset (1932–1936)
- Nord's Wharf (1932)
- Dooralong (1933–1934)

The following teams have participated in Central Coast First or 'A' Grade competitions since 1947:

- Central Wyong (2006, 2013–15)
- Gosford Townies/Giants (1948–1999)
- Kariong Kookaburras (??–1990s)
- Morisset (1947–1948)
- Toronto (1954–1959)
- Rathmines (1955)
- South Lakes (1958)
- Dora Creek Swampies (2024)

Wyong and Morisset combined in 1957 to field teams in A, B, C and D grades. Mount Penang competed in Under 18s from 1969 to 1975. The Gosford Townies fielded grade teams from 1948 to 1999, and junior teams from the 1950s.

=== Second division/open age ===
A Second Division competition ran from 1976 to 2005. Clubs that were promoted to First Division / Grade were Toukley, Northern Lakes (Munmorah), Berkeley Vale and Kincumber. Junior club Budgewoi-Buff Point ran Second Division teams from 1978 to 2002 and in 2005.

Central Wyong competed in Second Division from 1977 to 2005, until 1988 as Grand Hotel. The club entered First Grade in 2006, dropped back to lower grades between 2007 and 2011, spent 2012 in the Newcastle & Hunter competition, and returned to Central Coast First Grade between 2013 and 2015. Central Wyong ran junior teams from 1994 to 2015.

This competition is now known as Open Age.

The teams that competed in Second Division were:

- Budgewoi-Buff Point Bulldogs (1978–2002, 2005)
- Central Wyong (1977–2005, 2007–11)
- Davistown (1976)
- Milson Island (1976–1979)
- The Valley (1977–1978)
- Gwandalan (1977–1978)
- Doyalson-Wyee (1980–1983)
- Terrigal Hotel (1981–1985)
- Woy Woy Hotel (1982–1989)
- Northlakes (1984–1986)
- Northern Lakes Warriors (Promoted to 1st Division)
- Toukley Hawks (Promoted to 1st Division)
- Berkeley Vale Panthers (Promoted to 1st Division)
- Kincumber Colts (Promoted to 1st Division)
- Mangrove Mountain (1988–1998)
- Tall Timbers Hotel (1989–2005)
- Peninsula Raiders (1990–2001)
- Terrigal Marlins (1996–1997)
- Mannering Park Lions (1997–1998)
- Bateau Bay Bees (1999–2005)
- Kulnura Bears (2000–2007)
- Wamberal Whales (2000–2005)
- Long Jetty Jets (2001–2005)

== Central Coast teams in other competitions ==
In 2003 four Central Coast teams (Erina, Ourimbah, The Entrance and Woy Woy) decided to field teams in the then Jim Beam Cup, the third highest ranked NSW Competition (below NRL and NSW Cup) featuring mainly Sydney-based competition teams. All teams remained in the Central Coast first grade competition with effectively reserve grade teams. After three seasons, all apart from The Entrance withdrew from the competition. The Entrance Tigers entered teams in the competition until 2007 and again, under different competition names, between 2010 and 2014. The Entrance Tigers won the Jim Beam Cup in 2003 and 2007 and the Ron Massey Cup in 2014.

Also in 2003, Wyong entered the Newcastle Rugby League Competition which was perceived to be a stronger league. Wyong remained part of the Central Coast junior competition and up until 2006, also fielded senior teams locally. Wyong were runner's up in the Newcastle Rugby League in 2007 and First Grade Premiers in 2009. This was Wyong's third stint in Newcastle rugby league competitions, having previously competed in Second Grade in 1912, 1913 and 1914; in Third Grade in 1945 and in a Southern Newcastle competition in 1946.

In 2013 Wyong left the Newcastle competition in a dispute over salary caps and instead entered a team in the NSW Cup, the second highest level of senior rugby league in NSW after the NRL. For two seasons, Wyong was the only team in that competition without a direct affiliation with an NRL club. At the same time Wyong returned to the Central Coast first grade competition after a six-year absence. In 2015, Wyong affiliated with the Sydney Roosters.

The Berkeley Vale Panthers competed in the NSWRL Sydney Metropolitan Women's Rugby League competition in 2015, 2016 and 2017.

== Senior Competition Premiers (2010–present) ==
The highest grade of senior rugby league in the Central Coast Division is the First Grade competition. In 2017 ten teams have entered the first grade competition; all ten also field teams in the Reserve Grade competition. Ten teams are competing the 2017 'Open Age' competition, a league for senior players at a standard below the first/reserve grade competition. A Ladies League tag competition began in 2015 and in 2017 involves ten teams and is sponsored by White Lady Funerals.

The 2020 and 2021 seasons were incomplete after being abandoned due to the COVID-19 pandemic. For full lists click the top of the section for that grade.

=== First grade results ===
| Year | Premiers | Grand final score | Runners up | Minor premiers |
|---|---|---|---|---|
| 2010 | Ourimbah Wyoming | 22–10 | Berkeley Vale | Ourimbah Wyoming |
| 2011 | Berkeley Vale | 38–18 | Ourimbah Wyoming | Ourimbah Wyoming |
| 2012 | Kincumber | 12–10 | Umina Beach | Terrigal |
| 2013 | Berkeley Vale | 21–20 | Erina | Terrigal |
| 2014 | Wyong | 8–6 | Berkeley Vale | Berkeley Vale |
| 2015 | The Entrance | 22–14 | Kincumber | The Entrance |
| 2016 | Wyong | 20–0 | Woy Woy | Wyong |
| 2017 | Terrigal | 12–4 | Wyong | Wyong |
| 2018 | The Entrance | 30–24 | Wyong | The Entrance |
| 2019 | The Entrance | 16–14 | Wyong | Wyong |
| 2022 | Toukley | 20–10 | Erina | Erina |
| 2023 | Toukley | 8–6 | Erina | Toukley |
| 2024 | Erina | 12–6 | Toukley | Erina |
| 2025 | Kincumber | 18-14 | Toukley | Erina |
| 2026 | Wyong | 18 - 4 | Erina | Erina |

=== Second grade results ===
| Year | Premiers | Grand final score | Runners up | Minor premiers |
|---|---|---|---|---|
| 2010 | Berkeley Vale | 36–12 | Erina | Erina |
| 2011 | The Entrance | 16–4 | Erina | The Entrance |
| 2012 | Umina Beach | 22–10 | Ourimbah Wyoming | Umina Beach |
| 2013 | Wyong | 42–24 | Berkeley Vale | Wyong |
| 2014 | Berkeley Vale | 26–20 | Wyong | Wyong |
| 2015 | The Entrance | 32–14 | Wyong | Wyong |
| 2016 | Kincumber | 22–14 | The Entrance | The Entrance |
| 2017 | The Entrance | 23–22 | Terrigal | The Entrance |
| 2018 | The Entrance | 34–14 | Wyong | Wyong |
| 2019 | The Entrance | 16–8 | Kincumber | The Entrance |
| 2022 | Erina | 30–4 | The Entrance | Erina |
| 2025 | The Entrance | 18–14 | Wyong | Erina |
| 2026 | Wyong | 30 - 14 | Erina | Erina |

=== Open age results ===
| Year | Premiers | Grand final score | Runners up | Minor premiers |
|---|---|---|---|---|
| 2010 | Erina | 24–16 | Toukley | Erina |
| 2011 | Central Wyong | 24–18 | Berkeley Vale | Erina |
| 2012 | Terrigal | 24–22 | Umina Beach | Umina Beach |
| 2013 | Northern Lakes | 32–6 | Erina | Wyong |
| 2014 | Wyong | 26–12 | Kincumber | Wyong |
| 2015 | Ourimbah Wyoming | 44–10 | Wyong | Ourimbah Wyoming |
| 2016 | Berkeley Vale | 15–14 | St. Edwards | St. Edwards |
| 2017 | Erina | 22–10 | St. Edwards | St. Edwards |
| 2018 | Woy Woy | 12–7 | Erina | Erina |
| 2019 | Wyong | 22–8 | Kincumber | Wyong |
| 2022 | Erina | 20–16 | St. Edwards | St. Edwards |
| 2025 | Wyong | 30-18 | Kincumber | Wyong |
| 2026 | Wyong | 12 - 8 | Erina | Wyong |

=== Women's Tackle results ===
| Year | Premiers | Grand final score | Runners up | Minor premiers |
|---|---|---|---|---|
| 2023 | Berkeley Vale | 18-4 | The Entrance | Berkeley Vale |
| 2024 | Berkeley Vale | 16-12 | The Entrance | The Entrance |
| 2025 | Wyong | 24-12 | Budgewoi | Wyong |
| 2026 | The Entrance | 22 - 14 | Wyong | Wyong |

=== Ladies league tag results ===
| Year | Premiers | Grand final score | Runners up | Minor premiers |
|---|---|---|---|---|
| 2015 | Kincumber | 18–0 | The Entrance | Kincumber |
| 2016 | Erina | 11–10 | The Entrance | The Entrance |
| 2017 | Terrigal | 26–6 | The Entrance | The Entrance |
| 2018 | The Entrance | 26–10 | Terrigal | The Entrance |
| 2019 | Wyong | 10–4 | The Entrance | The Entrance |
| 2022 | The Entrance | 8–0 | Wyong | Wyong |

== See also ==
- Rugby League Competitions in Australia
- Rugby league in New South Wales
