= 2025 Newcastle Knights season =

National Rugby League NSW season

Team information
- CEO: Phil Gardner
- Coach: Adam O'Brien
- Captain: Kalyn Ponga
- Stadium: McDonald Jones Stadium
- Avg. attendance: 20,884
← 2024	2026 →

The 2025 Newcastle Knights season is the club's 38th season in the professional National Rugby League (NRL) football competition in Australia.

Coached by Adam O'Brien and captained by Kalyn Ponga, the club competed in the NRL's 2025 Telstra Premiership. Ultimately they finished with the wooden spoon.

== Squad ==
Newcastle Knights 2026 squad
Top 30 squad - 2026 NRL season			Development list	Coaching staff
Matt Arthur – HK; Bradman Best – CE; Dylan Brown – HB; Tom Cant – SR; Mat Croker – LK; Phoenix Crossland – HK; Lachlan Crouch – PR; Wilson De Courcey – CE; Tyson Frizell – LK; Dane Gagai – CE	Tyson Gamble – FE; Peter Hola – PR; Cody Hopwood – PR; Brodie Jones – PR; Asu Kepaoa – SR; Dylan Lucas – SR; Francis Manuleleua – SR; Greg Marzhew – WG; Jermaine McEwen – SR; Trey Mooney – PR	Kalyn Ponga (c) – FB; Jacob Saifiti – PR; Elijah Salesa-Leaumoana – LK; Pasami Saulo – PR; James Schiller – WG; Fletcher Sharpe – FE, FB; Sandon Smith – HB, FE; Wil Sullivan – PR; Dominic Young – WG	Harrison Graham – HK; Fletcher Hunt – FB, CE; Matthew Hunter – HB; Kyle McCarthy – CE; Connor Votano – FB	Head coach: Justin Holbrook; Assistant coaches: Brett White - Defence; Steven Hales - Attack; Danny Buderus; Matt Lantry - Pathways; Michael Dobson - NSW Cup Coach; Alex Moore - Jersey Flegg coach; Will Markwick - NRL Head of Performance; Chris James - Director of Football; Legend: (c) Captain(s); (vc) Vice-captain(s); Updated: 11 September 2026; Source(s): Newcastle Knights Profiles, Rugby League Project

== Transfers and re-signings ==
=== Gains ===
Player/Coach	Previous club	Length	Ref.
Taj Annan	Queensland Reds	2027	
Matt Arthur	Parramatta Eels	2027	
Francis Manuleleua	Penrith Panthers	2027	
James Schiller	Canberra Raiders	2027	
Tyrone Thompson	Chiefs	2025	

=== Losses ===
Player/Coach	Club	Ref.
David Armstrong	Leigh Leopards	
Jed Cartwright	Hull F.C.	
Ronald Griffiths (NSW Cup coach)	New Zealand Warriors	
Zach Herring	Featherstone Rovers	
Thomas Jenkins	Penrith Panthers	
Rory Kostjasyn (assistant coach)	Dolphins	
Krystian Mapapalangi	Western Suburbs Magpies	
Myles Martin	Canberra Raiders	
Fletcher Myers	South Sydney Rabbitohs	
Laitia Moceidreke	Released	
Ryan Rivett	Toulouse Olympique	
Daniel Saifiti	Dolphins	
Enari Tuala	Canterbury-Bankstown Bulldogs	

=== Promoted juniors ===
Player	Junior side	Ref.
Wilson De Courcey	Jersey Flegg Cup	
Cody Hopwood	Jersey Flegg Cup	
Jermaine McEwen	Jersey Flegg Cup	
Connor Votano	Jersey Flegg Cup	

=== Player contract situations ===
2025 (leaving)	2025 (off-contract)	2026	2027	2028
Leo Thompson	Jayden Brailey	Tom Cant	Taj Annan	Cody Hopwood
	Paul Bryan	Jack Cogger	Matt Arthur	
	Mat Croker	Phoenix Crossland	Bradman Best	
	Adam Elliott	Wilson De Courcey	Dylan Lucas	
	Jackson Hastings	Tyson Frizell	Francis Manuleleua	
	Jack Hetherington	Dane Gagai	Kyle McCarthy	
	Brodie Jones	Tyson Gamble	Jermaine McEwen	
	Riley Jones	Greg Marzhew	Kalyn Ponga	
	Kai Pearce-Paul	Fletcher Sharpe	Jacob Saifiti	
	Will Pryce		James Schiller	
	Sebastian Su'a			
	Tyrone Thompson			
	Connor Votano			

== Pre-season ==
Newcastle played the Parramatta Eels in Newcastle and the Sydney Roosters in Gosford as their pre-season fixtures. Both matches were part of the third edition of the NRL Pre-season Challenge.

Win Draw Loss

Round 2: 14 February 2025	Newcastle Knights	18-44	Parramatta Eels	Newcastle
18:00 AEDT	Tries: Marzhew 22'; Aoake 46'; McCarthy 49'; McEwen 58'; Goals: Votano 1/3 59'	[1st: 4-22; 2nd: 14-22; Report Report]	Tries: Brown 2'; Tago 26'; Tuilagi 29'; Papalii 38'; Samrani 61'; Miller-Stephen 64', 77'; Loizou 72'; Goals: Volkman 3/4 4', 31', 39'; Lynn 3/4 63', 65', 78'	Stadium: McDonald Jones Stadium; Attendance: 5,964; Referee: Belinda Sharpe

Round 3: 23 February 2025	Sydney Roosters	10-48	Newcastle Knights	Gosford
16:00 AEDT	Tries: Tupou 17'; Smith 75'; Goals: Smith 1/2 75'; Sin bin: Leniu (yellow card) 2' to 12'	[1st: 4-36; 2nd: 6-12; Report Report]	Tries: Saifiti 3', 13'; Sharpe 7', 27'; Brailey 33'; Ponga 37'; Cant 52'; Votano 71'; Goals: Ponga 7/1 5', 9', 13', 28', 35', 38', 54'; Pryce 1/1 72'	Stadium: Industree Group Stadium; Attendance: 4,964; Referee: Peter Gough

== Regular season ==
=== Ladder ===
Pos	Team	Pld	W	D	L	B	PF	PA	PD	Pts	Qualification
1	Canberra Raiders	24	19	0	5	3	654	506	+148	44	Advance to finals series
2	Melbourne Storm	24	17	0	7	3	671	459	+212	40	Advance to finals series
3	Canterbury-Bankstown Bulldogs	24	16	0	8	3	534	414	+120	38	Advance to finals series
4	Brisbane Broncos (P)	24	15	0	9	3	680	508	+172	36	Advance to finals series
5	Cronulla-Sutherland Sharks	24	15	0	9	3	599	490	+109	36	Advance to finals series
6	New Zealand Warriors	24	14	0	10	3	517	496	+21	34	Advance to finals series
7	Penrith Panthers	24	13	1	10	3	576	469	+107	33	Advance to finals series
8	Sydney Roosters	24	13	0	11	3	653	521	+132	32	Advance to finals series
9	Dolphins	24	12	0	12	3	721	596	+125	30	
10	Manly Warringah Sea Eagles	24	12	0	12	3	555	534	+21	30	
11	Parramatta Eels	24	10	0	14	3	502	578	−76	26	
12	North Queensland Cowboys	24	9	1	14	3	538	684	−146	25	
13	Wests Tigers	24	9	0	15	3	477	612	−135	24	
14	South Sydney Rabbitohs	24	9	0	15	3	427	608	−181	24	
15	St. George Illawarra Dragons	24	8	0	16	3	498	628	−130	22	
16	Gold Coast Titans	24	6	0	18	3	520	719	−199	18	
17	Newcastle Knights	24	6	0	18	3	338	638	−300	18	

Source: National Rugby League
(P) Premiers

=== Results by round ===
Round	1	2	3	4	5	6	7	8	9	10	11	12	13	14	15	16	17	18	19	20	21	22	23	24	25	26	27
Ground	A	H	A	–	A	H	H	A	A	H	H	A	A	H	H	A	H	–	H	H	A	–	H	A	H	A	A
Result	W	W	L	B	L	L	L	L	W	L	L	W	L	W	L	W	L	B	L	L	L	B	L	L	L	L	L
Position	7	4	10	8	9	12	14	15	12	14	15	14	15	15	15	13	13	13	13	14	15	14	15	16	16	16	17
Points	2	4	4	6	6	6	6	6	8	8	8	10	10	12	12	14	14	16	16	16	16	18	18	18	18	18	18

Source: National Rugby League
A = Away; H = Home; N = Neutral; B = Bye; W = Win; D = Draw; L = Loss

=== Matches ===
The league fixtures were released on 21 November 2024.

Bye Win Draw Loss Fixtures

Round 1: 7 March 2025	Wests Tigers	8–10	Newcastle Knights	Campbelltown
18:00 AEDT	Tries: Skelton 6'; Goals: Doueihi 2/2 7', 28 pen'	1st: 8–0; 2nd: 0–10; Report	Tries: Sharpe 51'; Marzhew 66'; Goals: Ponga 1/2 52'	Stadium: Campbelltown Sports Stadium; Attendance: 13,160; Referee: Liam Kennedy

Round 2: 13 March 2025	Newcastle Knights	26–12	Dolphins	Newcastle
20:00 AEDT	Tries: Schiller 9', 13'; Best 19'; Gagai 27'; Lucas 44'; Goals: Ponga 3/5 11', 29', 45'; Sin bin: Pearce-Paul (yellow card) 68' to 78'	1st: 20–6; 2nd: 6–6; Report	Tries: Nicholls 32'; Katoa 66'; Goals: Isaako 2/2 33', 67'	Stadium: McDonald Jones Stadium; Attendance: 18,531; Referee: Gerard Sutton

Round 3: 22 March 2025	Gold Coast Titans	26–6	Newcastle Knights	Gold Coast
18:35 AEST	Tries: S. Fifita 16'; Campbell 32'; Fermor 54'; D. Fifita 67'; Goals: Campbell 5/6 17', 39 pen', 46 pen', 56', 69'	1st: 12–0; 2nd: 14–6; Report	Tries: Best 74'; Goals: Ponga 1/1 75'	Stadium: Cbus Super Stadium; Attendance: 14,602; Referee: Liam Kennedy

Round 4 (Bye for Newcastle Knights)

Round 5: 6 April 2025	Canterbury-Bankstown Bulldogs	20–0	Newcastle Knights	Sydney Olympic Park
18:15 AEST	Tries: Curran 41'; Todd 45'; Mann 70'; Goals: Crichton 4/4 3 pen', 43', 47', 71'	1st: 2–0; 2nd: 18–0; Report	Sin bin: Crossland (yellow card) 45' to 55'	Stadium: Accor Stadium; Attendance: 24,113; Referee: Ashley Klein

Round 6: 13 April 2025	Newcastle Knights	4–20	Wests Tigers	Newcastle
16:05 AEST	Tries: Sharpe 79'; Sin bin: Gagai (yellow card) 52' to 62'	1st: 0–14; 2nd: 4–6; Report	Tries: Turuva 18' To'a 27'; Bula 32'; Doueihi 32'; Goals: Doueihi 2/5 34', 53 pen' Sin bin: To'a (yellow card) 52' to 62'	Stadium: McDonald Jones Stadium; Attendance: 25,960; Referee: Gerard Sutton

Round 7: 20 April 2025	Newcastle Knights	14–34	Cronulla-Sutherland Sharks	Newcastle
16:05 AEST	Tries: Marzhew 30' Sharpe 70'; Schiller 78'; Goals: Ponga 1/3 71'; Sin bin: Schiller (yellow card) 44' to 54'	1st: 4–16; 2nd: 10–18; Report	Tries: Kaufusi 11' Fonua-Blake 16'; Stonestreet 21', 46'; Kennedy 49'; Hiroti 73'; Goals: Hynes 5/6 13', 18', 47', 50', 75'	Stadium: McDonald Jones Stadium; Attendance: 24,248; Referee: Ashley Klein

Round 8: 25 April 2025	New Zealand Warriors	26–12	Newcastle Knights	Christchurch
18:05 AEST	Tries: Pompey 8', 71' Ford 28', 35'; Egan 71'; Goals: Metcalf 2/4 10', 36'; Tuaupiki 1/1 72'; Sin bin: Niukore (yellow card) 1' to 11'	1st: 16–0; 2nd: 10–12; Report	Tries: Schiller 49' Jones 76'; Goals: Ponga 2/2 50', 70'; Sin bin: Thompson (yellow card) 4' to 14'	Stadium: Apollo Projects Stadium; Attendance: 17,095; Referee: Wyatt Raymond

Round 9: 3 May 2025	South Sydney Rabbitohs	4–30	Newcastle Knights	Brisbane
15:00 AEST	Tries: Tass 65'	1st: 0–18; 2nd: 4–12; Report	Tries: Sharpe 4', 8', 60'; Cogger 12'; Best 36'; Goals: Ponga 5/5 6', 10', 13', 47', 62'	Stadium: Suncorp Stadium; Attendance: 39,682; Referee: Liam Kennedy

Round 10: 9 May 2025	Newcastle Knights	20–24	Gold Coast Titans	Newcastle
18:00 AEST	Tries: Lucas 15'; Sharpe 23'; Croker 27'; Goals: Ponga 4/4 3 pen', 17', 24', 28'	1st: 20–6; 2nd: 0–18; Report	Tries: Sami 34', 46'; Brimson 65', 77'; Goals: Campbell 4/4, 35', 48', 66', 77'	Stadium: McDonald Jones Stadium; Attendance: 15,193; Referee: Belinda Sharpe

Round 11: 16 May 2025	Newcastle Knights	6–28	Parramatta Eels	Newcastle
18:00 AEST	Tries: Schiller 74'; Goals: Ponga 74'; Sin bin: Pearce-Paul (yellow card) 61' to 71'	1st: 0–10; 2nd: 6–18; Report	Tries: Moses 10'; Lomax 14', 55'; Brown 63'; Samrani 66'; Goals: Zac Lomax 4/6 11', 56', 62 pen', 65'	Stadium: McDonald Jones Stadium; Referee: Todd Smith

Round 12: 24 May 2025	Penrith Panthers	6–25	Newcastle Knights	Bathurst
17:30 AEST	Tries: Hasset 57'; Goals: Alamoti 1/1 59'; Sin bin: Henry (yellow card) 22' to 32'	1st: 0–24; 2nd: 6–1; Report	Tries: Sharpe 4'; Lucas 9', 11', 23'; Goals: Gagai 4/4 5', 10', 13', 25'; Drop goals: Cogger 1/1 74'	Stadium: Carrington Park; Referee: Belinda Sharpe

Round 13: 30 May 2025	St. George Illawarra Dragons	20–6	Newcastle Knights	Kogarah
20:00 AEST	Tries: Jaydn Su'A 20'; Clinton Gutherson 24'; Loko Pasifiki Tonga 36'; Goals: Valentine Holmes 4/4 22', 26', 38', pen 62'	1st: 18–0; 2nd: 2–6; Report	Tries: Kai Pearce-Paul 69'; Goals: Dane Gagai 1/1 70'	Stadium: Jubilee Stadium; Attendance: 10,411; Referee: Grant Atkins

Round 14: 5 June 2025	Newcastle Knights	26–22 (g.p.)	Manly Warringah Sea Eagles	Newcastle
19:50 AEST	Tries: Fletcher Sharpe 45', 74'; Fletcher Hunt 53'; James Schiller 61'; Kalyn Ponga 81'; Goals: Dane Gagai 3/4 46', 55', 75'	1st: 0–16; 2nd: 22–8; ET1: 4–0; Report	Tries: Toluta'u Koula 12'; Toafofoa Sipley 26'; Haumole Olakau'atu 33'; Tommy Talau 67'; Goals: Reuben Garrick 3/4 14', 28', 68'	Stadium: McDonald Jones Stadium; Referee: Wyatt Raymond

Round 15: 14 June 2025	Newcastle Knights	8–12	Sydney Roosters	Newcastle
17:30 AEST	Tries: McCarthy 3'; Goals: Gagai 2/2 5', pen 56'	1st: 6–0; 2nd: 2–12; Report	Tries: Foketi 60'; Wong 70'; Goals: Smith 2/2 61', 71'	Stadium: McDonald Jones Stadium; Attendance: 24,849; Referee: Gerard Sutton

Round 16: 21 June 2025	Dolphins	20–26	Newcastle Knights	Perth
17:30 AEST	Tries: Nikorima 10'; Lemuelu 31'; Isaako 53'; Tabuai-Fidow 59'; Goals: Isaako 2/4 32', 61'	1st: 10–16; 2nd: 10–10; Report	Tries: Sharpe 4'; Best 18', 63'; Young 24'; Jones 78'; Goals: Gagai 3/5 5', 19', 79'; Sin bin: Gagai (yellow card) 50' to 60'	Stadium: HBF Park; Attendance: 10,077; Referee: Grant Atkins

Round 17: 27 June 2025	Newcastle Knights	18–22	Canberra Raiders	Newcastle
20:00 AEST	Tries: Schiller 49', 74'; McEwen 64'; Goals: Ponga 1/1 51'; Gagai 2/2 66', 75'	1st: 0–16; 2nd: 18–6; Report	Tries: Sasagi 15'; Weekes 23'; Strange 27'; Stuart 57'; Goals: Fogarty 3/4 25', 29', 59'	Stadium: McDonald Jones Stadium; Referee: Peter Gough

Round 18 (Bye for Newcastle Knights)

Round 19: 12 July 2025	Newcastle Knights	14–32	Melbourne Storm	Newcastle
15:00 AEST	Tries: Young 11', 27'; Hunt 70'; Goals: Hastings 1/3 71'	1st: 8–6; 2nd: 6–26; Report	Tries: Katoa 38', 75'; Loiero 43', 58'; Bradley 47', 61'; Goals: Meaney 3/5 9 pen.', 45', 59'; Pezet 1/1 76'	Stadium: McDonald Jones Stadium; Attendance: 21,017; Referee: Todd Smith

Round 20: 20 July 2025	Newcastle Knights	15–20	New Zealand Warriors	Newcastle
16:05 AEST	Tries: Hunt 21'; Gagai 25'; Marzhew 30'; Goals: Hastings 0/2; Gagai 1/2 56 pen' Field goals: Cogger 74'	1st: 12–6; 2nd: 3–14; Report	Tries: Pompey 7'; Vaimauga 49'; Halasima 80'; Goals: Boyd 4/4 8', 50', 67 pen', 80'	Stadium: McDonald Jones Stadium; Attendance: 21,117; Referee: Grant Atkins

Round 21: 27 July 2025	Canberra Raiders	44–18	Newcastle Knights	Canberra
14:00 AEST	Tries: Weekes 9'; Sasagi 24'; Savage 37'; Starling 46'; Timoko 53', 72'; Martin 66'; Goals: Fogarty 8/8 10', 25', 39', 47', 55', 57pen', 68', 73'	1st: 18–18; 2nd: 26–0; Report	Tries: Kai Pearce-Paul 17'; Marzhew 34'; Hunt 30'; Goals: Gagai 3/3 19', 35', 40'	Stadium: GIO Stadium; Attendance: 11,068; Referee: Wyatt Raymond

Round 22 (Bye for Newcastle Knights)

Round 23: 8 August 2025	Newcastle Knights	12–48	Penrith Panthers	Newcastle
18:00 AEST	Tries: Croker 51'; McEwen 56'; Goals: Cogger 52', 57'	1st: 0–26; 2nd: 12–22; Report	Tries: Garner 2'; Smith 5'; Henry 25'; To'o 37'; Jenkins 39'; McLean 43', 66'; Papali'i 62'; Tago 72'; Goals: Cleary 6/9 6', 27', 40', 44', 63', 73'	Stadium: McDonald Jones Stadium; Attendance: 20,197; Referee: Wyatt Raymond

Round 24: 17 August 2025	North Queensland Cowboys	38–4	Newcastle Knights	Townsville
16:05 AEST	Tries: Drinkwater 3', 71'; Dearden 29'; Burns 31'; Purdue 46'; Nanai 66'; Goals: Drinkwater 6/6 5', 29', 33', 47', 67', 72'; Sin bin: Robson (yellow card) 18' to 28'	1st: 20–0; 2nd: 18–4; Report	Tries: Young 53'	Stadium: Queensland Country Bank Stadium; Attendance: 16,640; Referee: Grant Atkins

Round 25: 24 August 2025	Newcastle Knights	12–46	Brisbane Broncos	Newcastle
18:00 AEST	Tries: Thompson 32'; Best 54'; Goals: Cogger 33', 55'	1st: 6–14; 2nd: 6–32; Report	Tries: Staggs 2'; Karapani 7'; Hetherington 26'; Mariner 44', 73'; Haas 59'; Walsh 66'; Shibasaki 68'; Riki 76'; Goals: Walsh 3/6 28', 45', 60'; Smoothy 1/1 67'; 1/2 Hunt 77'	Stadium: McDonald Jones Stadium; Attendance: Todd Smith; Referee: 25,813

Round 26: 31 August 2025	Cronulla-Sutherland Sharks	40–16	Newcastle Knights	Cronulla
14:00 AEST	Tries: Fonua-Blake 25'; Mulitalo 30', 42', 71'; Talakai 39'; Hiroti 61'; Hamlin-Uele 79'; Goals: Hynes 6/7 26', 32', 40', 44', 72', 79'	1st: 18–10; 2nd: 22–6; Report	Tries: Hunt 4'; Marzhew 16'; Salesa-Leaumoana 77'; Goals: Cogger 2/3 5', 77'	Stadium: Sharks Stadium; Attendance: 12,234; Referee: Gerard Sutton

Round 27: 7 September 2025	Parramatta Eels	66–10	Newcastle Knights	Parramatta
16:05 AEST	Tries: Brown 1'; Moses 4', 16', 35'; Smith 20'; Doorey 32'; Addo-Carr 43', 46', 72'; Paulo 48'; Da Silva 75'; Penisini 78'; Goals: Lomax 8/10 3', 18', 21', 34', 36', 47', 50', 73'; Brown 1/2 79'	1st: 34–4; 2nd: 32–6; Report	Tries: McEwen 27'; Marzhew 55'; Goals: Gagai 1/2 57'	Stadium: CommBank Stadium; Attendance: 23,359; Referee: Wyatt Raymond

== NRL Women's team ==
2025 Newcastle Knights season

Team information
- CEO: Phil Gardner
- Coach: Ben Jeffries
- Captain: Yasmin Clydsdale
- Stadium: McDonald Jones Stadium
← 2024	2026 →

The 2025 Newcastle Knights Women's season will be the 5th in the club's history. Coached by Ben Jeffries and captained by Yasmin Clydsdale, they will compete in the NRLW's 2025 NRL Women's Premiership.

Newcastle Knights women's – current squad
2025 NRLW top 24 squad			Development list	Coaching staff
26 Yasmin Clydsdale (c) – SR; 27 Olivia Higgins – HK, LK; 28 Shanice Parker – CE; 29 Sienna Yeo – SR; 30 Jesse Southwell – HB; 33 Tayla Predebon – PR; 34 Simone Karpani – LK, PR; 37 Tiana Davison – LK	41 Kayla Romaniuk – LK, PR; 44 Sheridan Gallagher – WG; 48 Viena Tinao – PR; 49 Georgia Roche – FE; 52 Grace Kukutai – LK; 53 Keighley Simpson – WG; 54 Lilly-Ann White – FB; 55 Tenika Willison – WG	56 Evie Jones – FE; 57 Evah McEwen – SR; Leilani Ahsam – HB; Fane Finau – SR; Jules Kirkpatrick – LK; Joeli Morris – LK; Leah Ollerton – HK; Botille Vette-Welsh – FB	Mercedez Taulelei-Siala – CE	Head coach: Ben Jeffries; Legend: (c) Captain(s); (vc) Vice-captain(s); Updated: 21 November 2024; Source(s): Newcastle Knights Profiles, Rugby League Project

=== Player gains and losses ===
Player gains
Player/Coach	Previous club	Length	Source
Tiana Davison	Sydney Roosters	2027	
Mercedez Taulelei-Siala	Tweed Heads Seagulls	2025	
Botille Vette-Welsh	Wests Tigers	2027	

Losses
Player/Coach	Club	Source
Laishon Albert-Jones	New Zealand Warriors	
Rima Butler	Sydney Roosters	
Jacinta Carter	Released	
Jayde Herdegen	Released	
Caitlan Johnston-Green	Cronulla-Sutherland Sharks	
Tamerah Leati	Released	
Nita Maynard	Released	
Abigail Roache	Released	
Tamika Upton	Brisbane Broncos	

Promoted juniors
Player	Junior side	Source
Joeli Morris	Knights NSW Women's Premiership	

==== Player contract situations ====
2025	2026	2027
Leilani Ahsam	Fane Finau	Tiana Davison
Yasmin Clydsdale	Olivia Higgins	Evie Jones
Sheridan Gallagher	Simone Karpani	Evah McEwen
Grace Kukutai	Jules Kirkpatrick	Georgia Roche
Leah Ollerton	Joeli Morris	Hannah Southwell
Shanice Parker	Tayla Predebon	Jesse Southwell
Mercedez Taulelei-Siala	Kayla Romaniuk	Botille Vette-Welsh
Viena Tinao	Tenika Willison	
Isabella Waterman		
Lilly-Ann White		

=== Results by round ===
Round	1	2	3	4	5	6	7	8	9	10	11
Ground	A	A	H	A	H	H	A	H	A	H	H
Result	L	W	W	W	W	W	L	L	L	W	W
Position	8	6	4	3	3	3	3	5	5	5	3
Points	0	2	4	6	8	10	10	10	10	12	14

Source: National Rugby League
A = Away; H = Home; W = Win; D = Draw; L = Loss

=== Matches ===
The league fixtures were released on 21 November 2024.

Win Draw Loss Fixtures

Round 1: 4 July 2025	Canterbury-Bankstown Bulldogs	26-12	Newcastle Knights	Sydney Olympic Park
17:40 AEST	Tries: Courtenay 29', 51'; Quinlan 33', 63'; Teakaraanga-Katoa 48'; Goals: Preston 3/5 34', 50', 52'	1st: 10-6; 2nd: 16-6 [Report Report]	Tries: Roche 15'; Vette-Welsh 54'; Goals: Southwell 17', 55'	Stadium: Accor Stadium; Referee: Ziggy Przeklasa-Adamski

Round 2: 12 July 2025	North Queensland Cowboys	6-26	Newcastle Knights	Townsville
17:15 AEST	Tries: Alisha Foord 68'; Goals: Kirra Dibb 1/1 68'	1st: 0-14; 2nd: 6-12 [Report Report]	Tries: Shanice Parker 14'; Gallagher 31'; Predebon 41'; Higgins 61'; Goals: Southwell 16', 29pen', 32', 42', 62'	Stadium: Queensland Country Bank Stadium; Attendance: 7,286; Referee: Liam Kennedy

Round 3: 20 July 2025	Newcastle Knights	36-20	New Zealand Warriors	Newcastle
18:15 AEST	Tries: Romaniuk 9'; Clysdale 11'; Staines 20'; Willison 27'; Kirkpatrick 49'; McEwen 55'; Goals: Jesse Southwell 6/6 10', 12', 21', 29', 51', 56'	1st: 24-6; 2nd: 12-14 [Report Report]	Tries: Takimoana 31', 36', 61'; Brake 65'; Goals: Patricia Maliepo 2/4 33', 62'	Stadium: McDonald Jones Stadium; Attendance: 3,348; Referee: Kasey Badger

Round 4: 27 July 2025	Parramatta Eels	6-30	Newcastle Knights	Granville Park
12:00 AEST	Tries: Albert 39'; Goals: Pearson 1/1 39'	1st: 0-12; 2nd: 6-18 [Report Report]	Tries: Staines 12'; Willison 24'; Clydsdale 46'; Gallagher 55'; Romaniuk 59'; Goals: Southwell 5/5 13', 25', 47', 57', 61'	Stadium: Eric Tweedale Stadium; Attendance: 618; Referee: Ziggy Przeklasa-Adamski

Round 5: 3 August 2025	Newcastle Knights	18-0	Canberra Raiders	Newcastle
13:45 AEST	Tries: Gallagher 38'; Davison 46'; Higgins 62'; Goals: Southwell 3/3 40', 47', 63'	1st: 6-0; 2nd: 12-0 [Report Report]		Stadium: McDonald Jones Stadium; Attendance: 6,093; Referee: Kasey Badger

Round 6: 9 August 2025	Newcastle Knights	30-6	Wests Tigers	Newcastle
15:15 AEST	Tries: Gallagher 2', 16'; Yeo 49'; Staines 54'; McEwen 61', 69'; Goals: Southwell 3/6 4', 51', 63'	1st: 10-6; 2nd: 20-0 [Report Report]	Tries: Bass 10'; Goals: Bass 1/1 11'	Stadium: McDonald Jones Stadium; Attendance: 1,637; Referee: Todd Smith

Round 7: 17 August 2025	Sydney Roosters	30-14	Newcastle Knights	Gosford
13:45 AEST	Tries: Strange 9'; Parker 26'; Aiken 43', 49'; Kernick 64'; Goals: Kelleher 5/5 10', 27', 45', 51', 65'	1st: 12-6; 2nd: 18-8 [Report Report]	Tries: Kirkpatrick 31'; Roche 46'; Staines 57'; Goals: Southwell 1/3 33'	Stadium: Industree Group Stadium; Attendance: 2,294; Referee: Ziggy Przeklasa-Adamski

Round 8: 24 August 2025	Newcastle Knights	16-46	Brisbane Broncos	Newcastle
11:50 AEST	Tries: Gallagher 9'; Davison 15'; Roche 23'; Goals: Southwell 2/3 16', 25'; Sin bin: Romaniuk (yellow card) 55' to 65'	1st: 16-18; 2nd: 0-28 [Report Report]	Tries: Hufanga 20'; Sauaso 29'; Johnson 32'; Maddick 35', 56'; Dam 38'; Upton 48'; Teitzel 59'; Robinson 66'; Goals: Teitzel 5/9 30', 39', 49', 57', 68'	Stadium: McDonald Jones Stadium; Attendance: 15,935; Referee: Kasey Badger

Round 9: 31 August 2025	Cronulla-Sutherland Sharks	19-18	Newcastle Knights	Cronulla
11:50 AEST	Tries: Ravics 25', 61', 65'; Anderson 69'; Goals: Kiria-Ratu 1/4 70'; Drop goals: Kiria-Ratu 1/1 70'	1st: 4-8; 2nd: 15-10 [Report Report]	Tries: White 3', 15', 46'; Gallagher 36'; Goals: Southwell 1/4 48'	Stadium: Sharks Stadium; Attendance: 2,757; Referee: Belinda Sharpe

Round 10: 7 September 2025	Newcastle Knights	28-22	Gold Coast Titans	Newcastle
13:45 AEST	Tries: Southwell 1', 68'; Gallagher 5'; Yeo 33'; Finau 41'; Goals: Southwell 4/5 3', 34', 43', 69'	1st: 16-12; 2nd: 12-10 [Report Report]	Tries: Clarke 17'; Elliston 22'; Faitala-Mariner 52'; Hippi 59'; Goals: Brown 3/4 18', 24', 60'	Stadium: McDonald Jones Stadium; Attendance: 2,047; Referee: Peter Gough

Round 11: 14 September 2025	Newcastle Knights	30-22	St. George Illawarra Dragons	Newcastle
13:45 AEST	Tries: Taulelei-Siala 16'; Gallagher 34'; Simpson 44', 55', 66'; Roche 48'; Goals: Southwell 3/6 45', 50', 57'	1st: 8-16; 2nd: 22-6 [Report Report]	Tries: Wilson 20'; Paseka 25'; Berry 31'; Sautia 62'; Goals: Millard 3/4 21', 33', 63'	Stadium: McDonald Jones Stadium; Attendance: 2,477; Referee: Matt Noyen
