= 2026 Newcastle Knights season =

National Rugby League NSW season

Team information
- CEO: Phil Gardner
- Coach: Justin Holbrook
- Captain: Kalyn Ponga
- Stadium: McDonald Jones Stadium
← 2025	2027 →

The 2026 Newcastle Knights season is the club's 39th season in the professional National Rugby League (NRL) football competition in Australia.

Coached by Justin Holbrook and captained by Kalyn Ponga, the club will compete in the NRL's 2026 Telstra Premiership.

== Squad ==
Newcastle Knights 2026 squad
Top 30 squad - 2026 NRL season			Development list	Coaching staff
Matt Arthur – HK; Bradman Best – CE; Dylan Brown – HB; Tom Cant – SR; Mat Croker – LK; Phoenix Crossland – HK; Lachlan Crouch – PR; Wilson De Courcey – CE; Tyson Frizell – LK; Dane Gagai – CE	Tyson Gamble – FE; Peter Hola – PR; Cody Hopwood – PR; Brodie Jones – PR; Asu Kepaoa – SR; Dylan Lucas – SR; Francis Manuleleua – SR; Greg Marzhew – WG; Jermaine McEwen – SR; Trey Mooney – PR	Kalyn Ponga (c) – FB; Jacob Saifiti – PR; Elijah Salesa-Leaumoana – LK; Pasami Saulo – PR; James Schiller – WG; Fletcher Sharpe – FE, FB; Sandon Smith – HB, FE; Wil Sullivan – PR; Dominic Young – WG	Harrison Graham – HK; Fletcher Hunt – FB, CE; Matthew Hunter – HB; Kyle McCarthy – CE; Connor Votano – FB	Head coach: Justin Holbrook; Assistant coaches: Brett White - Defence; Steven Hales - Attack; Danny Buderus; Matt Lantry - Pathways; Michael Dobson - NSW Cup Coach; Alex Moore - Jersey Flegg coach; Will Markwick - NRL Head of Performance; Chris James - Director of Football; Legend: (c) Captain(s); (vc) Vice-captain(s); Updated: 3 November 2026; Source(s): Newcastle Knights Profiles, Rugby League Project

== Pre-season ==
Newcastle played the Parramatta Eels in Newcastle and the Sydney Roosters in Gosford as their pre-season fixtures. Both matches were part of the third edition of the NRL Pre-season Challenge.

Win Draw Loss

Saturday, 7 February	St. George Illawarra Dragons	28–18	Newcastle Knights	Jubilee Stadium, Sydney
18:30 AEST (UTC+10:00)	Tries: Reed 12'; Tu 23'; Kerr 49'; Feagai 69'; Buchanan 75'; Sloan 77'; Goals: Reed 13', 25' (2/5); O'Neill (0/0)	Report	Tries: McCarthy 16'; Jones 27'; Schiller 31'; Cant 64'; Goals: Cant 66' (1/1); Smith (0/3)	Attendance: 3,926; Referee: Peter Gough

Saturday, 14 February	Newcastle Knights	0–28	Canterbury-Bankstown Bulldogs	McDonald Jones Stadium, Newcastle
17:00 AEST (UTC+10:00)		1st: 0–16; 2nd: 0–12; Report	Tries: Sua 15'; Burton 19'; Salmon 33'; Kikau 64'; Toy 74'; Goals: Crichton 2/3 21', 35' O'Sullivan 2/2 65', 75'	Attendance: 8,358; Referee: Liam Kennedy

== Regular season ==
=== Ladder ===
Pos	Team	Pld	W	D	L	B	PF	PA	PD	Pts	Qualification
1	Penrith Panthers	24	18	0	6	3	683	347	+336	42	Advance to finals series
2	New Zealand Warriors	24	18	0	6	3	728	418	+310	42	Advance to finals series
3	Dolphins	24	17	0	7	3	662	506	+156	40	Advance to finals series
4	Sydney Roosters (P)	24	16	0	8	3	619	501	+118	38	Advance to finals series
5	Cronulla-Sutherland Sharks	24	14	0	10	3	672	523	+149	34	Advance to finals series
6	South Sydney Rabbitohs	24	14	0	10	3	694	581	+113	34	Advance to finals series
7	Newcastle Knights	24	14	0	10	3	633	591	+42	34	Advance to finals series
8	North Queensland Cowboys	24	13	0	11	3	568	652	−84	32	Advance to finals series
9	Manly Warringah Sea Eagles	24	11	0	13	3	623	524	+99	28	
10	Melbourne Storm	24	11	0	13	3	594	576	+18	28	
11	Canberra Raiders	24	11	0	13	3	581	626	−45	28	
12	Canterbury-Bankstown Bulldogs	24	11	0	13	3	476	536	−60	28	
13	Parramatta Eels	24	9	0	15	3	497	678	−181	24	
14	Brisbane Broncos	24	8	0	16	3	471	677	−206	22	
15	Wests Tigers	24	8	0	16	3	445	699	−254	22	
16	Gold Coast Titans	24	6	0	18	3	477	663	−186	18	
17	St. George Illawarra Dragons	24	5	0	19	3	392	717	−325	16	

Source: National Rugby League
Rules for classification: 1) competition points; 2) points differential; 3) percentage; (Note: Greater percentage of points scored for and against, being determined by points scored for divided by points scored against expressed as a percentage.) 4) tries scored; (Note: Further tiebreakers (in order) include goals scored, field goals kicked; least amount of penalties conceded.)
(P) Premiers

=== Results by round ===
Round	1	2	3	4	5	6	7	8	9	10	11	12	13	14	15	16	17	18	19	20	21	22	23	24	25	26	27
Ground	H	A	H	A	H	A	A	H	H	A	A	-	H	A	-	H	H	H	A	A	H	A	A	H	H	A	-
Result	W	W	L	W	W	L	L	L	W	W	W	B	W	L	B	W	W	W	L	L	L	W	W	W	L	L	B
Position	5	4	8	4	3	6	8	11	10	8	6	5	4	7	7	5	5	4	5	6	7	6	6	6	6	7	7
Points	2	4	4	6	8	8	8	8	10	12	14	16	18	18	20	22	24	26	26	26	26	28	30	32	32	32	34

A = Away; H = Home; N = Neutral; B = Bye; W = Win; D = Draw; L = Loss

=== Matches ===
The league fixtures were released on 14 November 2025.

Bye Win Draw Loss Fixtures

Round 1: Sunday 1st March	Newcastle Knights	28–18	North Queensland Cowboys	Las Vegas
13:15 AEDT	Tries: Sharpe 6' Marzhew 13'; Best 45'; Young 47'; Mooney 72'; Goals: Ponga 4/5 7', 14', 46', 73'	1st: 12–12; 2nd: 16–6; Report	Tries: Luki 25' Taulagi 30', 51'; Goals: Clifford 3/3 26', 31', 53'	Stadium: Allegiant Stadium; Attendance: 45,719; Referee: Ashley Klein

Round 2: Sunday 15th March	Manly-Warringah Sea Eagles	16–36	Newcastle Knights	Brookvale
16:05 AEDT	Tries: Fogarty 14'; Trbojevic 20'; Olakau'atu 43'; Goals: Fogarty 2/3 16', 44'; Sin bin: Hetherington (yellow card) 76' to 86'	1st: 10–30; 2nd: 6–6; Report	Tries: Marzhew 1'; Young 11', 46'; Ponga 25'; Hunt 35'; Frizell 38'; Goals: Ponga 2/2 2', 13'; Smith 4/5 26', 37', 39', 67 Pen'	Stadium: 4 Pines Park; Attendance: 17,107; Referee: Todd Smith

Round 3: Saturday 21st March	Newcastle Knights	12–38	New Zealand Warriors	Newcastle
15:00 AEDT	Tries: Hunt 3'; Marzhew 65'; Goals: Smith 2/2 4', 67'; Sin bin: Hunt (yellow card) 32' to 42'; Mooney (yellow card) 75' to 85'	1st: 6–18; 2nd: 6–20; Report	Tries: Clark 12'; Ford 29'; Halasima 38'; Fisher-Harris 51'; Boyd 54'; Hanson 80'; Goals: Boyd 5/6 30', 39', 53', 56'; Ford 5/6 80'	Stadium: McDonald Jones Stadium; Attendance: 21,682; Referee: Liam Kennedy

Round 4: Saturday 28th March	Canterbury-Bankstown Bulldogs	16–24	Newcastle Knights	Sydney
15:00 AEDT	Tries: Burton 48', 54'; Kiraz 72'; Goals: Crichton 2/3 50', 55'	1st: 0–16; 2nd: 16–8; Report	Tries: Young 6', 60', 69'; Frizell 33'; Lucas 39'; Goals: Smith 2/5 34', 40'; Sin bin: Lucas (yellow card) 8' to 18'	Stadium: Accor Stadium; Attendance: 20,572; Referee: Peter Gough

Round 5: Sunday 5th April	Newcastle Knights	32–12	Canberra Raiders	Newcastle
16:05 AEST	Tries: Marzhew 28', 68'; Sharpe 32'; Young 43', 76'; Crossland 47'; Goals: Smith 4/6 34', 49', 70', 77'	1st: 10–6; 2nd: 22–6; Report	Tries: Sasagi 10'; Strange 70'; Goals: Sanders 2/2 12', 71'; Sin bin: Tamale (yellow card) 42' to 52'	Stadium: McDonald Jones Stadium; Referee: Adam Gee

Round 6: Sunday 12th April	Wests Tigers	42–22	Newcastle Knights	Sydney
16:05 AEST	Tries: Turuva 3', 15', 54'; Koroisau 11'; Herbert 34'; Bula 38', 61'; May 65'; Goals: Madden 5/8 5', 12', 35', 40', 66'	1st: 28–4; 2nd: 14–18; Report	Tries: Young 27'; Gagai 58'; Hunt 76'; Mooney 78'; Goals: Smith 3/4 59', 76', 78'	Stadium: Campbelltown Sports Stadium; Referee: Wyatt Raymond

Round 7: Sunday 19th April	Sydney Roosters	38–24	Newcastle Knights	Sydney
14:00 AEST	Tries: Wong 2'; Savala 13', 50'; Walker 43'; Tedesco 55'; Nawaqanitawase 60', 68'; Goals: Walker 5/7 3', 14', 44', 51', 57'	1st: 12–24; 2nd: 26–0; Report	Tries: Hunt 9', 20', 27'; Mooney 17'; Goals: Smith 4/4 10', 19', 22', 29'	Stadium: Sydney Football Stadium (2022); Attendance: 22,409; Referee: Ashley Klein

Round 8: Sunday 26th April	Newcastle Knights	12–44	Penrith Panthers	Newcastle
14:00 AEST	Tries: Crossland 36'; Brown 52'; Goals: Smith 2/2 37', 54'	1st: 6–24; 2nd: 6–20	Tries: Edwards 12', 15', 20'; Cleary 29'; Lussick 47'; To'o 64', 68'; Tago 76'; Goals: Cleary 6/8 13', 17', 21', 30', 49', 77'	Stadium: McDonald Jones Stadium; Referee: Gerard Sutton

Round 9: Sunday 3rd May	Newcastle Knights	42–38	South Sydney Rabbitohs	Newcastle
14:00 AEST	Tries: Mooney 5', 73'; Lucas 9', 29'; Marzhew 20', 23', 62'; Goals: Ponga 7/8 6', 11', 22', 31', 63', 75', 47 Pen'	1st: 28–10; 2nd: 14–28; Report	Tries: Keppie 26'; Johnston 31', 57'; Walker 42', 65'; Duncan 54'; Mitchell 70'; Goals: Mitchell 5/7 28', 44', 55', 66', 72'	Stadium: McDonald Jones Stadium; Referee: Liam Kennedy

Round 10: Saturday 9th May	St. George Illawarra Dragons	10–44	Newcastle Knights	Wollongong
15:00 AEST	Tries: Stewart 43'; Tu 64'; Goals: Holmes 1/2 66'	1st: 0–32; 2nd: 10–12; Report	Tries: Marzhew 7', 23', 53', 57', 75'; Young 16', 36'; Best 29'; Lucas 32'; Goals: Ponga 4/9 18', 25', 31', 32'	Stadium: WIN Stadium; Attendance: 10,916; Referee: Todd Smith

Round 11: Sunday 17th May	Gold Coast Titans	12–36	Newcastle Knights	Brisbane
14:00 AEST	Tries: Pascoe 2'; Morrin 56'; Goals: Campbell 2/2 3', 57'	1st: 6–6; 2nd: 6–30; Report	Tries: Sharpe 26', 68'; Marzhew 45'; Young 51', 61', 72'; Gagai 66'; Goals: Ponga 4/7 28', 46', 52', 67'	Stadium: Suncorp Stadium; Referee: Wyatt Raymond

Round 12 (Bye for Newcastle Knights)

Round 13: Saturday 30th May	Newcastle Knights	28–22	Parramatta Eels	Newcastle
15:00 AEST	Tries: Lucas 2', 58'; Marzhew 22'; Graham 44'; Hunt 70'; Goals: Ponga 4/5 4', 23', 45', 60'	1st: 12–10; 2nd: 16–12; Report	Tries: Kelly 9'; Walker 28'; Samrani 63'; Iongi 73'; Goals: Papalii 3/4 30', 64', 74'	Stadium: McDonald Jones Stadium; Attendance: 23,001

Round 14: Friday 5th June	Melbourne Storm	32–30	Newcastle Knights	Melbourne
18:00 AEST	Tries: Utoikamanu 7'; Waitere 22'; Warbrick 37'; Hughes 45'; Leo 55'; Loiero 69'; Goals: Faalogo 4/6 8', 46', 56', 70'	1st: 14–12; 2nd: 18–18	Tries: Sharpe 16'; Lucas 29'; Brown 40'; McEwen 60'; Saifiti 72'; Goals: Ponga 5/5 17', 31', 42', 61', 73'	Stadium: AAMI Park; Attendance: 14,268; Referee: Ashley Klein

Round 15 (Bye for Newcastle Knights)

Round 16: Friday 19th June	Newcastle Knights	22–20	St. George Illawarra Dragons	Newcastle
20:00 AEST	Tries: Sharpe 5', 8'; Smith 54'; Goals: Smith 5/5 6', 9', 55', 38 Pen', 40 Pen'	1st: 16–12; 2nd: 6–8; Report	Tries: Holmes 24'; Sloan 32'; Tu 60'; Egan 70'; Goals: Holmes 2/4 25', 33'	Stadium: McDonald Jones Stadium; Attendance: 19,092; Referee: Gerard Sutton

Round 17: Sunday 28th June	Newcastle Knights	12–6	Wests Tigers	Newcastle
16:05 AEST	Tries: Lucas 53'; Best 74'; Goals: Ponga 2/2 54', 75'	1st: 0–6; 2nd: 12–0; Report	Tries: Sukkar 10'; Goals: Doueihi 1/1 12'	Stadium: McDonald Jones Stadium; Attendance: 22,968; Referee: Peter Gough

Round 18: Sunday 5th July	Newcastle Knights	13–12	Dolphins	Newcastle
16:05 AEST	Tries: Lucas 15'; Hunt 36'; Goals: Smith 2/2 17', 37'; Brown 1/1 75 FG'	1st: 12–0; 2nd: 1–12; Report	Tries: Isaako 50'; Donoghoe 58'; Goals: Isaako 2/3 59', 68 Pen'	Stadium: McDonald Jones Stadium; Attendance: 16,896; Referee: Wyatt Raymond

Round 19: Sunday 12th July	South Sydney Rabbitohs	26–24	Newcastle Knights	Sydney
14:00 AEST	Tries: Graham 9'; Tatola 17'; Fifita 28'; Duncan 39'; Gray 63'; Goals: Ward 1/1 18'; Humphreys 2/4 40', 65'	1st: 20–6; 2nd: 6–18; Report	Tries: Young 33'; Ponga 68', 69'; Graham 75'; Goals: Ponga 4/4 34', 69', 70', 75'	Stadium: Accor Stadium; Referee: Grant Atkins

Round 20: Friday 17th July	Cronulla-Sutherland Sharks	20–18	Newcastle Knights	Sydney
18:00 AEST	Tries: Kennedy 14'; Katoa 26'; Mulitalo 48'; Goals: Hynes 4/4 15', 28', 35 Pen', 50'	1st: 14–12; 2nd: 6–6; Report	Tries: Ponga 8'; Marzhew 19', 78'; Lucas 38'; Goals: Ponga 1/4 78'	Stadium: Ocean Protect Stadium; Attendance: 11,123; Referee: Ashley Klein

Round 21: Friday 24th July	Newcastle Knights	22–23	Sydney Roosters	Newcastle
18:00 AEST	Tries: Manuleleua 22' Croker 28'; Young 47'; Best 71'; Goals: Smith 3/5 29', 49', 73'	1st: 10–6; 2nd: 12–17; Report	Tries: Tedesco 14', 43', 58' Smith 68'; Goals: Walker 3/4 16', 59', 69'; Cherry-Evans 1/1 77'	Stadium: McDonald Jones Stadium; Attendance: 21,313; Referee: Wyatt Raymond

Round 22: Saturday 1st August	Brisbane Broncos	6–30	Newcastle Knights	Brisbane
19:35 AEST	Tries: Walsh 59'; Goals: Walsh 1/1 60'; Sin bin: Mariner (yellow card) 6' to 16' Walsh (yellow card) 24' to 34'	1st: 0–14; 2nd: 6–16; Report	Tries: Sharpe 2', 75'; Young 7'; Marzhew 32', 62'; Crossland 46'; Goals: Smith 3/6 4', 48', 76'; Sin bin: McEwen (yellow card) 24' to 34'	Stadium: Suncorp Stadium; Attendance: 37,538; Referee: Grant Atkins

Round 23: Sunday 9th August	Canberra Raiders	24–30	Newcastle Knights	Canberra
14:00 AEST	Tries: Stuart 17'; Hosking 22'; Sasagi 34', 43'; Goals: Sanders 4/5 19', 24', 35', 55 Pen'; Sin bin: Horsburgh (yellow card) 73' to 83'	1st: 18–18; 2nd: 6–12; Report	Tries: Sharpe 2'; Young 10', 78'; Ponga 25'; Gagai 57'; Goals: Smith 5/6 3', 11', 27', 59', 64 Pen'	Stadium: GIO Stadium; Attendance: 8,507; Referee: Ashley Klein

Round 24: Sunday 16th August	Newcastle Knights	36–26	Gold Coast Titans	Newcastle
14:00 AEST	Tries: Gagai 4', 17'; Marzhew 7', 69'; Hunt 48'; Sharpe 60', 74'; Goals: Smith 4/7 6', 18', 62', 75'	1st: 16–10; 2nd: 20–16; Report	Tries: Fermor 32', 77'; Campbell 36'; Morrin 56'; Ilias 78'; Goals: Campbell 3/5 33', 77', 78'	Stadium: McDonald Jones Stadium; Attendance: 20,003; Referee: Liam Kennedy

Round 25: Saturday 22nd August	Newcastle Knights	24–44	Manly-Warringah Sea Eagles	Newcastle
15:00 AEST	Tries: Hunt 9', 61'; Marzhew 14'; Young 22'; Goals: Smith 4/5 10', 24', 30 Pen', 63'; Sin bin: Young (yellow card) 34' to 44'	1st: 18–24; 2nd: 6–20; Report	Tries: Faulalo 2'; Navale 32'; Feledy 34', 38', 49'; Garrick 58'; Saab 68'; Hopoate 71'; Goals: Fogarty 6/8 4', 33', 36', 40', 50', 72'	Stadium: McDonald Jones Stadium; Attendance: 24,537; Referee: Wyatt Raymond

Round 26: Sunday 30th August	New Zealand Warriors	46–32	Newcastle Knights	Auckland
	Tries: Laban 18', 76'; Egan 22'; Clark 26'; Vaimauga 35'; Leiataua 42'; Pompey 51'; Khan-Pereira 62'; Goals: Tuaupiki 7/8 23', 27', 36', 44', 52', 64', 77'	1st: 22–20; 2nd: 24–12; Report	Tries: Hunt 4', 39'; Manuleleua 9'; McEwen 14'; Marzhew 54', 57'; Goals: Smith 4/6 11', 16', 56', 58'; Sent off: Saifiti (red card)	Stadium: Go Media Stadium; Attendance: 25,853; Referee: Adam Gee (referee)

== Finals series ==
=== Matches ===
Win Draw Loss Fixtures

QEF: 11 September 2026	South Sydney Rabbitohs	10–20	Newcastle Knights	Sydney
19:50 AEST	Tries: Graham 35'; Gray 74'; Goals: Mitchell 1/2 36'	Report	Tries: McEwen 4', 61'; Gagai 25'; Young 65'; Goals: Smith 2/4 27', 62'	Stadium: Allianz Stadium; Attendance: 28,152; Referee: Ashley Klein

SF: 20 September 2026	New Zealand Warriors	10–12	Newcastle Knights	Auckland
18:05 NZST	Tries: Halasima 12', 69'; Goals: Tuaupiki 1/2 14'	Report	Tries: Sharpe 28'; Young 44'; Goals: Smith 2/2 30', 46'	Stadium: Eden Park; Attendance: 48,511; Referee: Ashley Klein

PF: 27 September 2026	Penrith Panthers	14–22	Newcastle Knights	Sydney
16:00 AEST	Tries: Talagi 11'; Smith 38'; Goals: Edwards 1/2 13'; Talagi 2/2 35', 39'	Report	Tries: Manuleleua 7'; Young 41'; Smith 58', 79'; Goals: Smith 3/4 8', 60', 79'; Sent off: Crossland (red card)	Stadium: Accor Stadium; Attendance: 57,102; Referee: Gerard Sutton

Grand Final: Sunday 4th October	Sydney Roosters	19–18	Newcastle Knights	Sydney
19:30 AEST	Tries: Nawaqanitawase 35', 59' Smith 47'; Goals: Walker 3/4 37', 48', 54 Pen'	1st: 6 -12; 2nd: 13 - 6 Report	Tries: Manuleleua 15' Ponga 29'; Marzhew 76'; Goals: Smith 3/3 17', 30', 76'	Stadium: Accor Stadium; Attendance: 80,814
