= Kyle McCarthy =

Kyle McCarthy may refer to:

- Kyle McCarthy (American football)
- Kyle McCarthy (rugby league)
