= Brett Mullins =

Australia international rugby league footballer

Personal information
- Born: 21 January 1972 (age 54) Sydney, New South Wales, Australia

Playing information
- Height: 190 cm (6 ft 3 in)
- Weight: 89 kg (14 st 0 lb)
- Position: Fullback, Wing, Centre
Club
Years	Team	Pld	T	G	FG	P
1990–00	Canberra Raiders	183	105	0	0	420
2001	Leeds Rhinos	12	4	0	0	16
2002	Sydney Roosters	26	17	0	0	68
	Total	221	126	0	0	504
Representative
Years	Team	Pld	T	G	FG	P
1992–96	NSW Country	4	0	0	0	0
1994–96	New South Wales	5	4	0	0	16
1994	Australia	5	4	0	0	16
1997	New South Wales (SL)	2	3	0	0	12
1997	Australia (SL)	3	2	0	0	8
- Father: Bill Mullins
- Relatives: Russell Mullins (uncle); James Schiller (nephew); Jack Hetherington (nephew); Brett Hetherington (brother in law)

Brett Mullins (born 21 January 1972) is an Australian former professional rugby league footballer who played in the 1990s, and early 2000s. A New South Wales State of Origin and Australian international representative back, he played his club football for Australian clubs the Canberra Raiders and Sydney Roosters, and for English club, the Leeds Rhinos. He was described as "one of the most exciting attacking weapons in rugby league."

Brett Mullins played in 209 first grade games during his 12-year career in Australia (183 for Canberra, 26 for the Roosters), during which he scored 105 tries for the Raiders and 17 for the Roosters and was equal second with Canberra teammate Jason Croker on the league's try scoring list in 1994 with 22 (Brisbane's Steve Renouf top scored with 23). He played 12 games for Leeds, scoring 4 tries.

He played in 8 test matches for Australia (5 under ARL control, 3 for SL) between 1994 and 1997, though only his tests under the ARL banner are counted as official as the SL tests aren't recognised by the ARL. He scored 7 tries from his 8 tests. He also played 7 games for New South Wales between 1994 and 1997, scoring 7 tries.

His father, William "Bill" Mullins was an Australian representative who played 190 first grade games for Eastern Suburbs Roosters, and his uncles Russell and Terry Mullins played for Sydney's Western Suburbs Magpies.

In 2015, Brett's son Bradley Mullins signed with the Sydney Roosters, playing in their Holden Cup squad in 2015 and 2016.

== Club career ==
=== Canberra Raiders ===
Brett Mullins made his first grade début for Canberra from the substitution bench in a 48–0 rout of the South Sydney Rabbitohs in 1990. He was recruited by Canberra from the Young Cherrypickers where he played as a junior. Mullins played on the wing, in the centres and also filled in at fullback during 1991, but an injury suffered in the Minor Preliminary Semi-final against Western Suburbs saw him miss a place in the Raiders Grand Final side that went down 12-19 to the Penrith Panthers.

Mullins continued playing in the three-quarters before securing the Raiders fullback spot following the retirement of Gary Belcher at the end of the 1993. During the 1994 NSWRL season, Mullins overcame several niggling injuries to play in the Raiders 36–12 Grand Final victory over Canterbury-Bankstown.

That season he finished with a total of 22 tries, which included back to back games against the Illawarra Steelers, and the Newcastle Knights where he scored four tries in each game. His end of season total of 22 tries equalled Noa Nadruku's club record and created the record for a fullback in the New South Wales Rugby League premiership (since equalled by Manly-Warringah fullback Brett Stewart in 2008).

During the Super League war which began in early 1995, Mullins remained loyal to the Super League aligned Raiders. Although he had risen to be the game's #1 fullback in 1994, between 1995 and 2000 he would alternate playing at fullback, centre or wing for Canberra.

Tall (6'3" or 190 cm) with a long stride, Mullins was known for his pace, though he would later state that "I wasn't really that quick. Over 40 metres or 50 metres I guess I was, but I wasn't over 100. I think I used to drink and smoke too much. There's no doubting I had a good time."

In 2000, in his final year with the club, Mullins emulated his father by surpassing the 100 try scoring mark in first grade rugby league. After his on-field altercation with his teammate Mark McLinden against Parramatta, where he abused and pushed his team-mate, Mullins was dropped from the squad by team coach and former teammate Mal Meninga, and fined $25,000.

=== Leeds Rhinos ===
Following his sacking from the Raiders, Mullins signed with English Super League team Leeds Rhinos. He played 12 games for the Rhinos in 2001 (4 of them Challenge Cup ties), scoring 4 tries.

=== Sydney Roosters ===
Mullins returned to Australia for the 2002 NRL season having signed with the Sydney Roosters (his father's former team when known as Eastern Suburbs) under the coaching of former Canberra, New South Wales and Australian teammate Ricky Stuart. In his final season before retiring, Mullins played 26 games for the Roosters (mostly on the wing) and scored 17 tries to take his tally to 122 tries from 209 premiership matches in Australia. His final season was a triumph as the Roosters won the 2002 NRL Grand Final, defeating the New Zealand Warriors 30–8 at Telstra Stadium in front of 80,130 fans. It was the club's first premiership since 1975, and saw him join his father as a premiership winner with the club (coincidentally, Bill Mullins had also played on the wing for the Roosters).

== Representative career ==
Brett Mullins made his senior representative début for NSW Country in the annual City vs Country Origin game played at the Sydney Football Stadium on 24 April 1992. He would play 4 games for Country until 1996.

Mullins made his State of Origin début on the wing for New South Wales in Game 2 of the 1994 State of Origin series at the Melbourne Cricket Ground in front of a then record rugby league attendance in Australia of 87,161. He would go on to represent NSW in 5 Origin games between 1994 and 1996 and twice under the Super League banner in 1997.

Despite playing on the wing for New South Wales in their 2-1 Origin series win over Queensland in 1994 (and despite the good form of incumbent Blues fullback Tim Brasher), Mullins made his test début at fullback for Australia in a one-off Test against France on 6 July 1994 at the Parramatta Stadium in Sydney, scoring a try in the Kangaroos record 58–0 win. At the end of the 1994 season, he went on the 1994 Kangaroo tour, playing fullback in all four tests on tour. Mullins played in 13 games on tour (once as a replacement) and was the 3rd leading try scorer with 11 behind only Andrew Ettingshausen (15) and Steve Renouf (12). The trio were the only players to reach a double figure of tries scored on the tour.

In 1995 during the Super League war, the Australian Rugby League (ARL) refused to select players who were aligned with Super League for representative games. This saw Mullins miss selection for both NSW and Australia in 1995. Towards the end of the year Mullins, along with fellow Canberra test players Laurie Daley, Ricky Stuart, Steve Walters and Bradley Clyde took the ARL to court in order to be ruled eligible for selection at the 1995 Rugby League World Cup to be played in the United Kingdom. The players won their court case, though it came as no surprise when only ARL loyal players were selected for the Australian World Cup squad.

Following the 1997 Super League season, Mullins was selected to play from the bench for the Australian Super League team against New Zealand in a one-off test at the North Harbour Stadium in Auckland with the Kiwis providing a shock 30–12 win. He was then selected in two matches of the Super League Test series against Great Britain. He played on the wing and scored 2 tries in Australia's 38-14 first test win over Great Britain at Wembley Stadium, and in the centres during the 20-12 second test loss at Old Trafford. Injury would keep him from Australia's 37–20 win in the third test at Elland Road in Leeds and the non playing Mullins was knocked unconscious by Great Britain prop Dean Sampson during the post match function after he spat on Sampson's wife. The test at Old Trafford would prove to be his final representative appearance.
