= Jack Hetherington =

Australian rugby league footballer

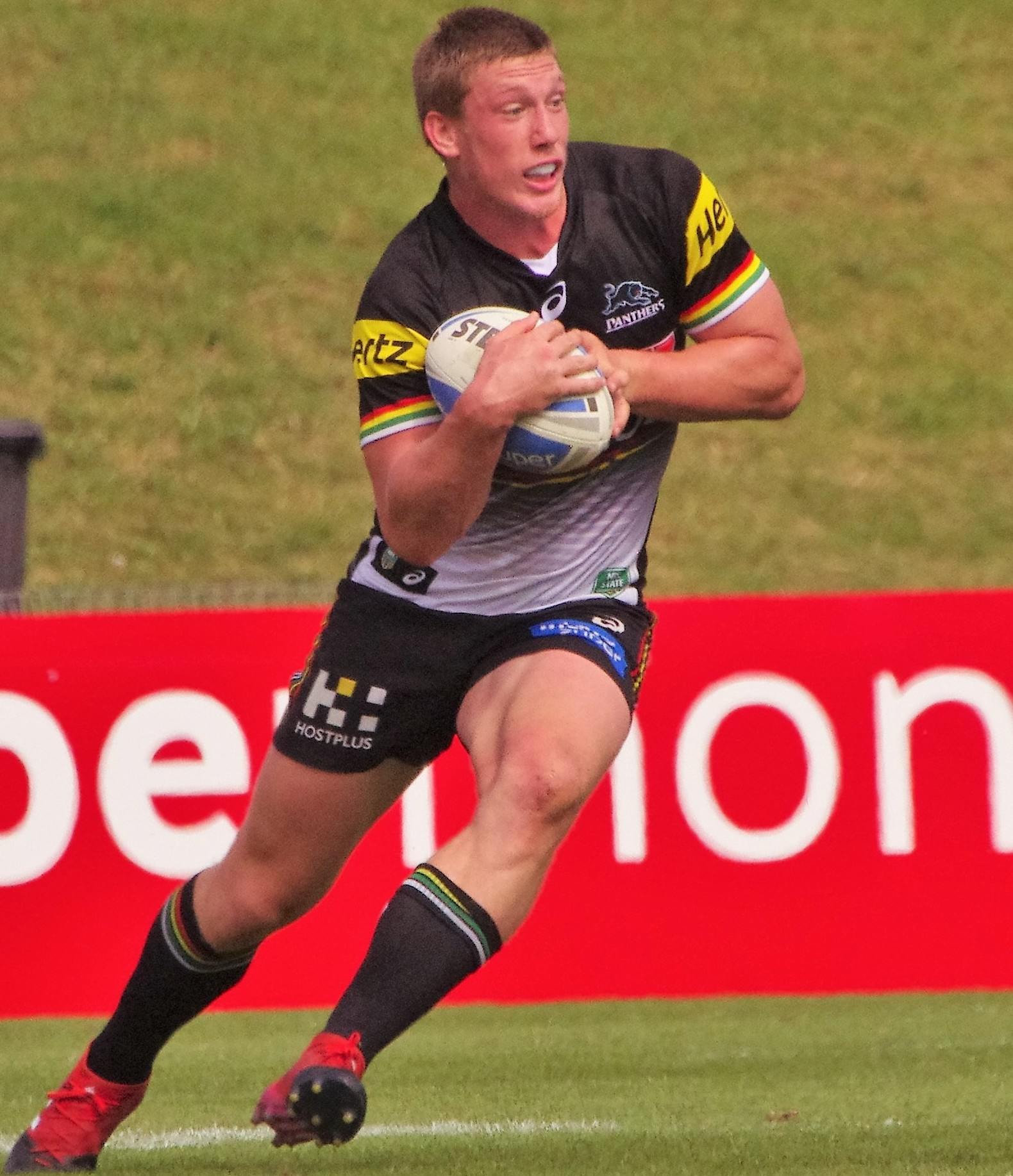

Personal information
- Born: 8 June 1996 (age 30) Canberra, ACT, Australia
- Height: 190 cm (6 ft 3 in)
- Weight: 107 kg (16 st 12 lb)

Playing information
- Position: Prop
Club
Years	Team	Pld	T	G	FG	P
2018–20	Penrith Panthers	17	0	0	0	0
2020(loan)	→ New Zealand Warriors	6	0	0	0	0
2021–22	Canterbury Bulldogs	20	1	0	0	4
2023–25	Newcastle Knights	53	2	0	0	8
2026–	Melbourne Storm	9	0	0	0	0
	Total	105	3	0	0	12
- Source: As of 24 July 2026
- Father: Brett Hetherington
- Relatives: Bill Mullins (grandfather); Brett Mullins (uncle); James Schiller (cousin)

Jack Hetherington (born 8 June 1996) is an Australian professional rugby league footballer who plays as a prop forward for the Melbourne Storm in the National Rugby League (NRL).

He previously played for the Penrith Panthers, New Zealand Warriors, Canterbury-Bankstown Bulldogs, and the Newcastle Knights in the NRL.

== Background ==
Hetherington was born in Canberra, Australian Capital Territory. He is the grandson of Bill Mullins, son of Brett Hetherington, nephew of Brett Mullins and cousin of Canberra Raiders player James Schiller.

Hetherington played his junior rugby league for the Valentine Devils and Young Cherrypickers.

== Playing career ==
=== 2018 & 2019 ===
In 2018, he made his National Rugby League début for Penrith against the Cronulla-Sutherland Sharks. Hetherington played 13 NRL games in his rookie season, later re-signing with Penrith until the end of the 2021 season.

=== 2020 ===
On 18 June 2020, Hetherington was temporarily released to join the New Zealand Warriors on loan. In round 13 of the 2020 NRL season, Hetherington was placed on report for a dangerous tackle on Manly player Martin Taupau. Hetherington was later suspended for four matches after pleading guilty to the dangerous tackle.

In October 2020, Hetherington was released by Penrith and he signed a contract to join Canterbury.

=== 2021 ===
In round 6 of the 2021 NRL season, Hetherington was sent off after hitting North Queensland player Valentine Holmes around the head with a dangerous high tackle. Canterbury would go on to lose the match 30–18.

On 20 April, Hetherington was given a five-game suspension for his dangerous high tackle after taking an early guilty plea.

In round 21, Hetherington was sent to the sin bin yet again after using a dangerous high tackle during Canterbury's 28–16 loss against the Wests Tigers. Hetherington made a total of 17 appearances for Canterbury in the 2021 NRL season as the club finished last and claimed the Wooden Spoon.

=== 2022 ===
In round 3 of the 2022 NRL season, Hetherington was taken from the field during Canterbury's loss against Manly. It was later announced that Hetherington would require shoulder surgery which ruled him out for the remainder of the season.

In June, Hetherington signed a three-year contract with the Newcastle Knights starting in 2023.

=== 2023 ===
Hetherington played 26 matches for Newcastle in the 2023 NRL season as the club finished 5th on the table. Hetherington played in both finals games as Newcastle were eliminated in the second week of the finals by the New Zealand Warriors.

=== 2024 ===
In round 8 of the 2024 NRL season, Hetherington was sent to the sin bin during Newcastle's loss against Canterbury. Hetherington was then spotted on video camera shadowboxing Reed Mahoney in the tunnel who had also been sin binned. Hetherington then punched Mahoney and the two players needed to be separated. Hetherington was handed a one-match ban over the incident. Hetherington played 21 matches for Newcastle in the 2024 NRL season as the club finished 8th and qualified for the finals. They were eliminated in the first week of the finals by North Queensland.

=== 2025 ===
Hetherington managed to make only seven appearances for Newcastle in the 2025 NRL season which saw the club finish last on the table and claim the wooden spoon. He was released by the Knights at the end of the season, joining the Melbourne Storm on a one-year contract for the 2026 NRL season.

=== 2026 ===
On 17 September 2026, the Storm announced that Hetherington had re-signed with the storm for a further year.

== Statistics ==
Year	Team	Games	Tries	Pts
2018	Penrith Panthers	13		
2019	Penrith Panthers	2		
2020	Penrith Panthers	2		
2020	New Zealand Warriors	6		
2021	Canterbury-Bankstown Bulldogs	17	1	4
2022	Canterbury-Bankstown Bulldogs	3		
2023	Newcastle Knights	26	1	4
2024	Newcastle Knights	20	1	4
2025	Newcastle Knights	7		
2026	Melbourne Storm	9		
2027	Melbourne Storm			
	Totals	105	3	12
