= Bill Mullins =

Australian rugby league footballer (b.1948)

Personal information
- Full name: William Mullins
- Born: 30 January 1948 (age 78) Campsie, New South Wales, Australia

Playing information
- Height: 184 cm (6 ft 0 in)
- Weight: 90 kg (14 st 2 lb)
- Position: Wing
Club
Years	Team	Pld	T	G	FG	P
1968–78	Eastern Suburbs	190	104	0	0	312
Representative
Years	Team	Pld	T	G	FG	P
1971–74	City Firsts	4	0	0	0	0
1971	New South Wales	1	1	0	0	3
- Source: Rugby League Project
- Relatives: Brett Mullins (son); Russell Mullins (brother); Jack Hetherington (grandson); James Schiller (grandson); Brett Hetherington (son in law)

William Mullins (born 30 January 1948) is an Australian former rugby league footballer who played during the 1960s and 1970s in the New South Wales Rugby League premiership, the major rugby league competition in Australia at the time.

== Career ==
=== Eastern Suburbs Roosters ===
A former professional runner, Mullins played his junior football with the Canterbury-Bankstown club before joining Eastern Suburbs in 1968 where he played 190 first grade matches in the years until 1978. At the time of his retirement, he was the club's leading try-scorer with 104 tries.

A tall, powerfully built wing, Mullins played in some of the great Easts sides of the seventies, winning premierships in 1974 and 1975, and finishing runners up in 1972 Grand Final. He also won pre-season cups in 1974 and 1977, mid-week cups in 1975 and 1978.

Mullins was a representative of City Firsts and New South Wales, though injuries suffered at the wrong times during his career prevented him from representing his country. In a trial for World Cup selection in 1971, Mullins suffered a broken jaw and again, in 1973 when he was 'king hit' in a game against Manly-Warringah costing him any chance of being selected to the 1973 Kangaroo tour.

During the 1976 NSWRFL season, Mullins played as a wing for Eastern Suburbs in their unofficial 1976 World Club Challenge match against British champions St. Helens in Sydney.

=== Young Cherry Pickers ===
At the end of the 1978 NSWRFL season, Mullins moved to the rural NSW town of Young where he played for the Young Cherry Pickers, but a series of broken legs brought about an end to his rugby league career.

== Personal life ==
Mullins for many years owned a fish and chip shop in Sydney's Charing Cross.

Brothers Russell and Terry Mullins played for Sydney's Western Suburbs Magpies against Bill and his son Brett Mullins is an Australian representative who has won premierships with Canberra and Sydney Roosters.

Mullins is the grandfather of the rugby league footballer for the Canterbury Bankstown Bulldogs; Jack Hetherington and Canberra Raiders outside back James Schiller.
