= Russell Mullins =

Australian rugby league footballer

Personal information
- Full name: Russell Robert Mullins
- Born: 3 August 1952 Sydney, New South Wales, Australia
- Died: 23 June 2025 (aged 72)

Playing information
- Position: Wing
Club
Years	Team	Pld	T	G	FG	P
1971–77	Western Suburbs	113	54	0	0	162
1978–79	Penrith Panthers	18	0	0	0	0
	Total	131	54	0	0	162
- Source: As of 2 July 2019
- Relatives: Bill Mullins (brother); Brett Mullins (nephew)

Russell Mullins (3 August 1952–23 June 2025) nicknamed "Flight" was an Australian rugby league footballer who played in the 1970s. He played for Western Suburbs and Penrith in the New South Wales Rugby League (NSWRL) competition.

== Background ==
Mullins was the brother of Bill Mullins and uncle of Brett Mullins.

== Playing career ==
Mullins made his first grade debut for Western Suburbs in 1971. The club would go on to finish last that season and claim the wooden spoon. In 1973, Mullins finished as the club's top try scorer with 8 tries. In 1974, Mullins again finished as the club's top try scorer with 15 tries as Wests made the finals and eventually the preliminary final against Eastern Suburbs. Mullins played on the wing against his brother Bill as Easts won the match 25-2 at the Sydney Cricket Ground.

In 1975 and 1976, Mullins finished as Wests top try scorer but the club missed out on the finals. Mullins' final season for Wests was in 1977, and he only managed 11 appearances and scored 3 tries before departing to Penrith. Mullins finished as Western Suburbs sixth highest try scorer. Mullins spent 2 uneventful years at Penrith where the club struggled towards the bottom of the ladder before retiring at the end of 1979.
