= James Schiller =

Australian rugby league footballer

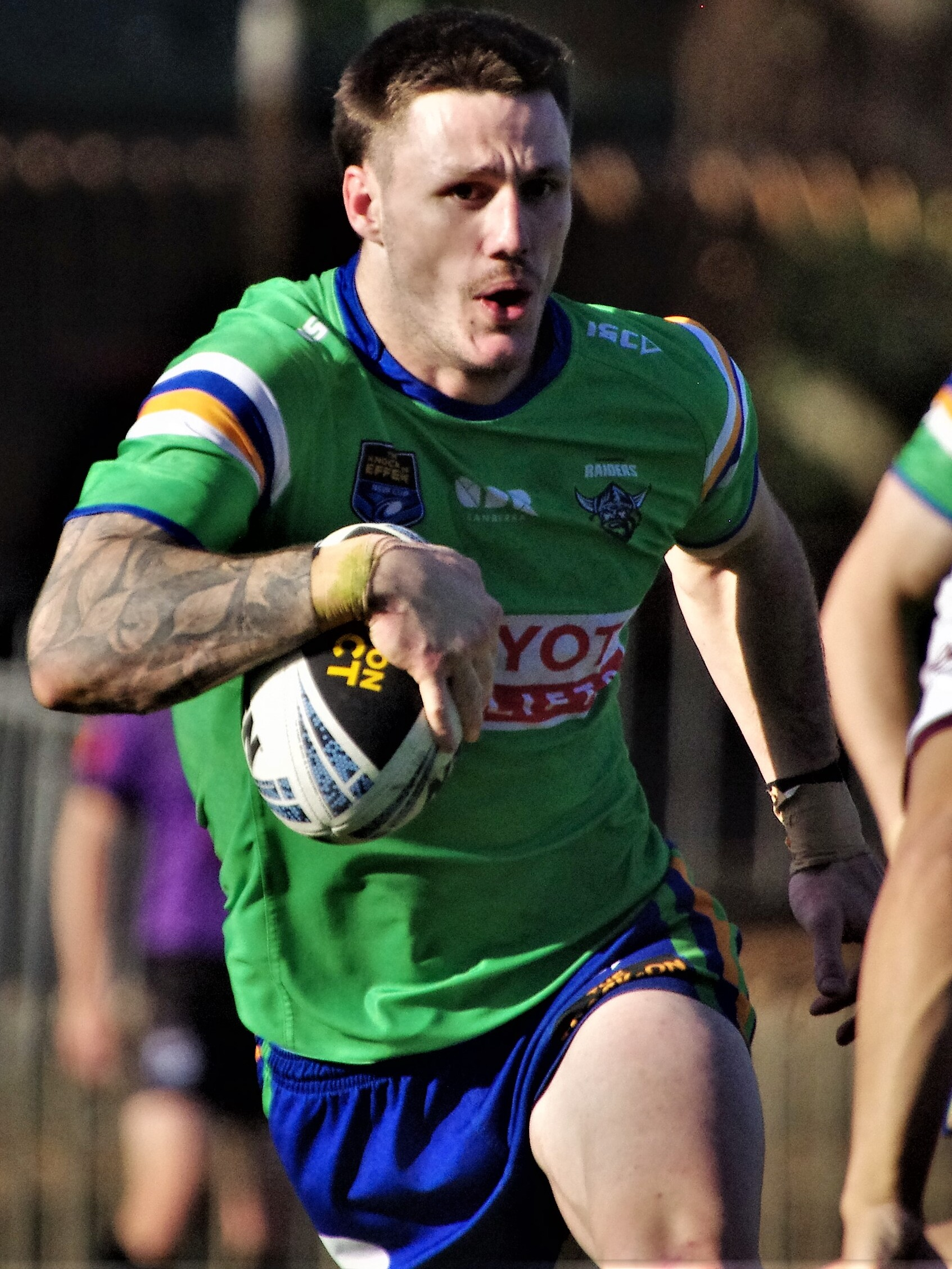

Personal information
- Born: 14 July 2001 (age 25) Young, New South Wales, Australia
- Height: 190 cm (6 ft 3 in)
- Weight: 95 kg (14 st 13 lb)

Playing information
- Position: Wing, Centre
Club
Years	Team	Pld	T	G	FG	P
2022–24	Canberra Raiders	15	9	0	0	36
2025–26	Newcastle Knights	18	8	0	0	32
2027–	Parramatta Eels	0	0	0	0	0
	Total	33	17	0	0	68
- Source: As of 14 November 2026
- Relatives: Brett Mullins (uncle); Bill Mullins (grandfather); Jack Hetherington (cousin)

James Schiller (born 14 July 2001) is an Australian professional rugby league footballer who plays as a winger or centre for the Parramatta Eels in the National Rugby League.

He previously played for the Canberra Raiders and Newcastle Knights.

== Background ==
Before turning to rugby league, Schiller was part of the Brumbies junior system. Schiller is the nephew of former Canberra Raiders player Brett Mullins, cousin of Newcastle Knights player Jack Hetherington, and grandson of former Eastern Suburbs winger of the century Bill Mullins.

== Playing career ==
=== 2022 ===
Schiller made his first grade debut in round 1 of the 2022 NRL season for Canberra against the Cronulla-Sutherland Sharks. In round 18, Schiller scored two tries for Canberra in their 20-16 upset victory over Melbourne.

=== 2023 ===
In the 2023 elimination final, Schiller scored two tries for Canberra in their 30-28 golden point extra-time loss against Newcastle.

=== 2024 ===
In round 4 of the 2024 NRL season, Schiller scored two tries for Canberra in their 36-22 loss against Cronulla.

In April, it was reported that Schiller had signed a three-year contract with the Newcastle Knights for the 2025 season.

=== 2025 ===
In round 2 of the 2025 NRL season, Schiller scored two tries for Newcastle in their 26-12 victory over the Dolphins. Schiller played a total of 17 games for Newcastle in the 2025 NRL season and scored eight tries. Newcastle would finish bottom of the table and claim their fifth Wooden Spoon in club history.

=== 2026 ===
On 12 November 2026, the Eels announced Schiller had signed with the club on a two year deal.

== Statistics ==
Year	Team	Games	Tries	Pts
2022	Canberra Raiders	6	2	8
2023	Canberra Raiders	4	2	8
2024	Canberra Raiders	5	5	20
2025	Newcastle Knights	17	8	32
2026	Newcastle Knights	1		
2027	Parramatta Eels			
	Totals	33	17	68
