= Connor Votano =

Australian rugby league player

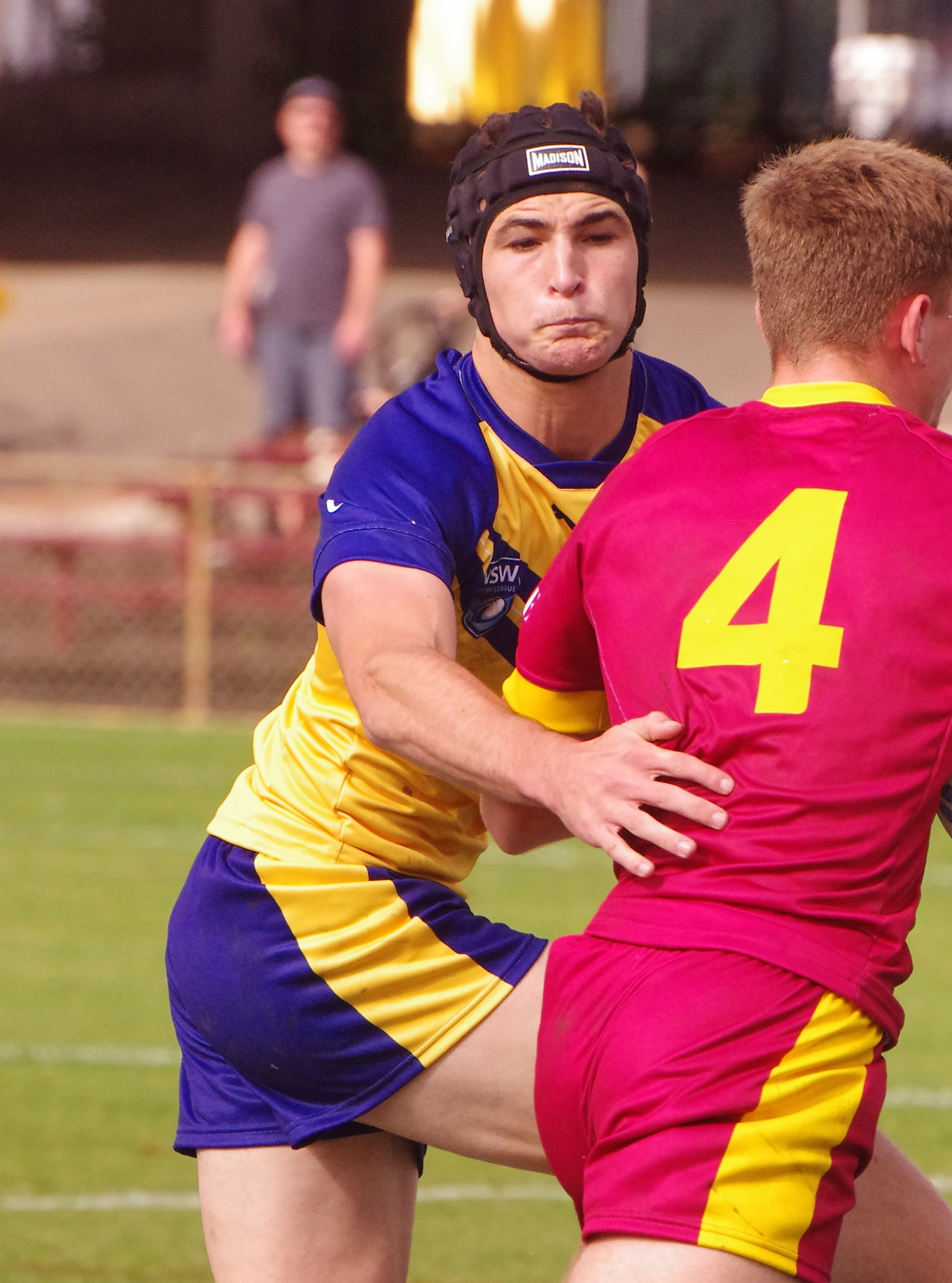

Personal information
- Born: 14 April 2006 (age 20) Gosford, New South Wales, Australia
- Height: 190 cm (6 ft 3 in)
- Weight: 90 kg (14 st 2 lb)

Playing information
- Position: Fullback
Club
Years	Team	Pld	T	G	FG	P
2025–26	Newcastle Knights	1	0	0	0	0
- Source: As of 17 August 2025

Connor Votano (born 14 April 2006) is an Australian professional rugby league footballer who currently plays for the Canterbury Bulldogs in the National Rugby League. His position is fullback.

== Background ==
Born in Gosford, New South Wales, Votano played his junior rugby league for The Entrance Tigers, before being signed by the Newcastle Knights. Connor has Italian heritage.

== Playing career ==
=== Early years ===
Votano rose through the ranks for the Newcastle Knights, representing the New South Wales under-19s team for the first time in 2024.

=== 2025 ===
In 2025, Votano joined the Knights' NRL development list. In round 24 of the 2025 NRL season, he made his NRL debut for the Knights against the North Queensland Cowboys.
