= Jermaine McEwen =

Samoa international rugby league player

Personal information
- Born: 6 April 2005 (age 21) Sydney, New South Wales, Australia
- Height: 185 cm (6 ft 1 in)
- Weight: 106 kg (16 st 10 lb)

Playing information
- Position: Second-row
Club
| Years | Team | Pld | T | G | FG | P |
|---|---|---|---|---|---|---|
| 2025– | Newcastle Knights | 40 | 7 | 0 | 0 | 28 |
Representative
| Years | Team | Pld | T | G | FG | P |
| 2026– | Samoa | 4 | 1 | 0 | 0 | 4 |
- Source: As of 8 November 2026

Jermaine McEwen (born 6 April 2005) is an Australian professional rugby league footballer who plays as a second-row forward for the Newcastle Knights in the National Rugby League and Samoa.

== Background ==
Born in Sydney, New South Wales, McEwen played his junior rugby league for the Bloomfield Tigers before being signed by the Newcastle Knights. McEwen attended Tregear Public School.

McEwen is the younger brother of Newcastle Knights NRLW player Evah McEwen.

== Playing career ==
=== Early Development ===
In 2023, McEwen was awarded the SG Ball Cup Player of the Year award, which is given to the top under-19s player in the competition.

=== Representative Honours ===
In June 2024, McEwan was selected to represent New South Wales in the Under-19s State of Origin match against Queensland.

He scored a try on his Samoa international début in the 2026 Rugby League World Cup 78-4 win over France on 16 October 2026.

== NRL career ==
McEwen rose through the ranks for the Newcastle Knights, before signing a three-year contract to join the top 30 NRL squad in 2025. McEwen made his NRL debut for Newcastle in Round 3 of the 2025 season, when they faced the Gold Coast Titans at Cbus Super Stadium. McEwan made 16 appearances for Newcastle in the 2025 NRL season as the club finished with the wooden spoon.

On 14 May 2026, Newcastle announced that McEwen re-signed with the club until the end of 2028.

McEwen played 24 matches for Newcastle in the 2026 NRL season including their 2026 NRL Grand Final loss to the Sydney Roosters.
