= Elijah Salesa-Leaumoana =

Samoan rugby league player

Personal information
- Born: 1 May 2004 (age 22) Motoʻotua, Samoa
- Height: 189 cm (6 ft 2 in)
- Weight: 100 kg (15 st 10 lb)

Playing information
- Position: Second-row, Prop
Club
Years	Team	Pld	T	G	FG	P
2025–	Newcastle Knights	9	1	0	0	4
- Source: As of 24 July 2026

Elijah Salesa-Leaumoana (born 1 May 2004) is a Samoan professional rugby league footballer who plays as second-row and prop for the Newcastle Knights in the National Rugby League.

== Background ==
Born in Motoʻotua, Samoa, Salesa-Leaumoana played his junior rugby league for the Mangere East Hawks, before being signed by the Newcastle Knights.

== Playing career ==
=== Early years ===
Salesa-Leaumoana rose through the ranks for the Newcastle Knights, playing with their S. G. Ball Cup and Jersey Flegg Cup teams in 2023, before graduating to their NSW Cup team.

=== 2025 ===
In March, Salesa-Leaumoana re-signed with the Knights, moving into their top 30 NRL squad in 2026. In round 14 of the 2025 NRL season, he made his NRL debut for the Knights against the Manly Warringah Sea Eagles.
