= Cody Hopwood =

Australian rugby league player

Personal information
- Born: 25 May 2006 (age 20) Gosford, New South Wales, Australia
- Height: 196 cm (6 ft 5 in)
- Weight: 105 kg (16 st 7 lb)

Playing information
- Position: Prop
Club
Years	Team	Pld	T	G	FG	P
2025–	Newcastle Knights	19	0	0	0	0
- Source: As of 4 October 2026

Cody Hopwood (born 25 May 2006) is an Australian professional rugby league footballer who plays as a prop for the Newcastle Knights in the National Rugby League.

== Background ==
Born in Gosford, New South Wales, Hopwood played his junior rugby league for the West Maitland Wallaroos, before being signed by the Newcastle Knights.

== Playing career ==
=== Early years ===
Hopwood rose through the ranks for the Newcastle Knights, also representing the New South Wales under-19s and Australian Schoolboys teams. In September 2024, he re-signed with the Knights on a 4-year contract until the end of 2028.

=== 2025 ===
In round 27 of the 2025 NRL season, Hopwood made his NRL debut for Newcastle against the Parramatta Eels. The match would finish in a 66-10 loss for Newcastle and also meant the club would finish with the Wooden Spoon in 2025.

=== 2026 ===
Hopwood played 18 games for Newcastle in the 2026 NRL season including their 2026 NRL Grand Final loss to the Sydney Roosters.
