= Newcastle Knights =

Australian rugby league football club

Club information
- Full name: Newcastle Rugby League; Football Club
- Nickname: Newy
- Short name: NEW
- Colours: Primary: Blue; Red; Secondary: White
- Founded: 1987
- Website: newcastleknights.com.au

Current details
- Ground: Newcastle International Sports Centre (30,000)
- CEO: Peter Parr
- Coach: Justin Holbrook (NRL); Ben Jeffries (NRLW)
- Captain: Kalyn Ponga (NRL); Yasmin Clydsdale (NRLW)
- Competition: National Rugby League
- 2026 season: 7th (Grand Finalists)
- Current season

Uniforms
| Home colours | Away colours |

Records
- Premierships: 2 (1997, 2001)
- Runners-up: 1 (2026)
- NSW Cup: 2 (1995, 2015)
- Wooden spoons: 5 (2005, 2015, 2016, 2017, 2025)
- Most capped: 257 – Danny Buderus
- Highest try scorer: 109 – Akuila Uate
- Highest points scorer: 2,176 – Andrew Johns

The Newcastle Knights are an Australian professional rugby league team based in Newcastle, the largest city in the Hunter Region of New South Wales, Australia. The club competes in the National Rugby League (NRL) premiership. Playing in red and blue, the Knights joined the top-tier competition in 1988, 79 years after the previous Newcastle-based team, the Newcastle Rebels, had departed the Sydney competition with the formation of a separate league competition based in the Newcastle region.

The club has won the premiership twice, in 1997 and 2001. Notable players include: Paul Harragon, Robbie O'Davis, Danny Buderus and rugby league Immortal Andrew Johns. The team's home ground is McDonald Jones Stadium.

== History ==
A Newcastle rugby league team had been assembled from players in the Newcastle Rugby League to compete in various competitions for most of the 20th century. The Newcastle Knights entered the New South Wales Rugby League (NSWRL) competition in 1988 with Allan McMahon as coach. Newcastle had previously been invited to field a team in the NSWRL competition for the 1982 season but declined, worried it would weaken the area's local league competition. The Canberra Raiders were admitted to the 1982 competition in their place.

The team was a success from the start, becoming one of the most popular clubs in its first season. By 1990, the team was strong enough to enter a play-off for fifth spot.

The club won their first competition, the Nissan Sevens, in 1991 and made the playoffs in 1992, where they were beaten by the St George Dragons. The Knights made the semi-finals again in 1995 when the competition became the Australian Rugby League (ARL), and won the reserve grade premiership the same year.

The club stayed loyal to the ARL when Rupert Murdoch started Super League in an attempt to win pay television rights to rugby league. This decision was very popular in the Newcastle and Hunter Region areas. News Limited formed the Hunter Mariners to compete with the Knights in the only season of Super League in Australia, but the Mariners failed to win much support in the area.

From 1997 to 2003, the Knights achieved a finals berth for seven consecutive years. The Knights won the 1997 Australian Rugby League premiership, defeating the Manly-Warringah Sea Eagles 22–16 in the Grand Final. The match is best remembered for its classic finish – with Darren Albert breaking a 16-all deadlock with a try just seven seconds from full-time. This win was a huge morale boost to the district following the closure of the area's biggest employer, the BHP Newcastle Steelworks, being announced earlier the same year. Seventy per cent of the winning squad were Newcastle juniors. This year, Robbie O'Davis won the Clive Churchill Medal.

The following season, Knights players Robbie O'Davis, Wayne Richards and Adam MacDougall tested positive for performance-enhancing drugs; however, all three maintained they started use after the Knights' 1997 victory. The three were suspended, despite O'Davis' claims the club was not notified his drug was banned until after his positive test, and MacDougall's medical reason for taking the steroids (his usage continued after he completed his suspension, now approved by the NRL). In addition, the Knights terminated Wayne Richards' contract.

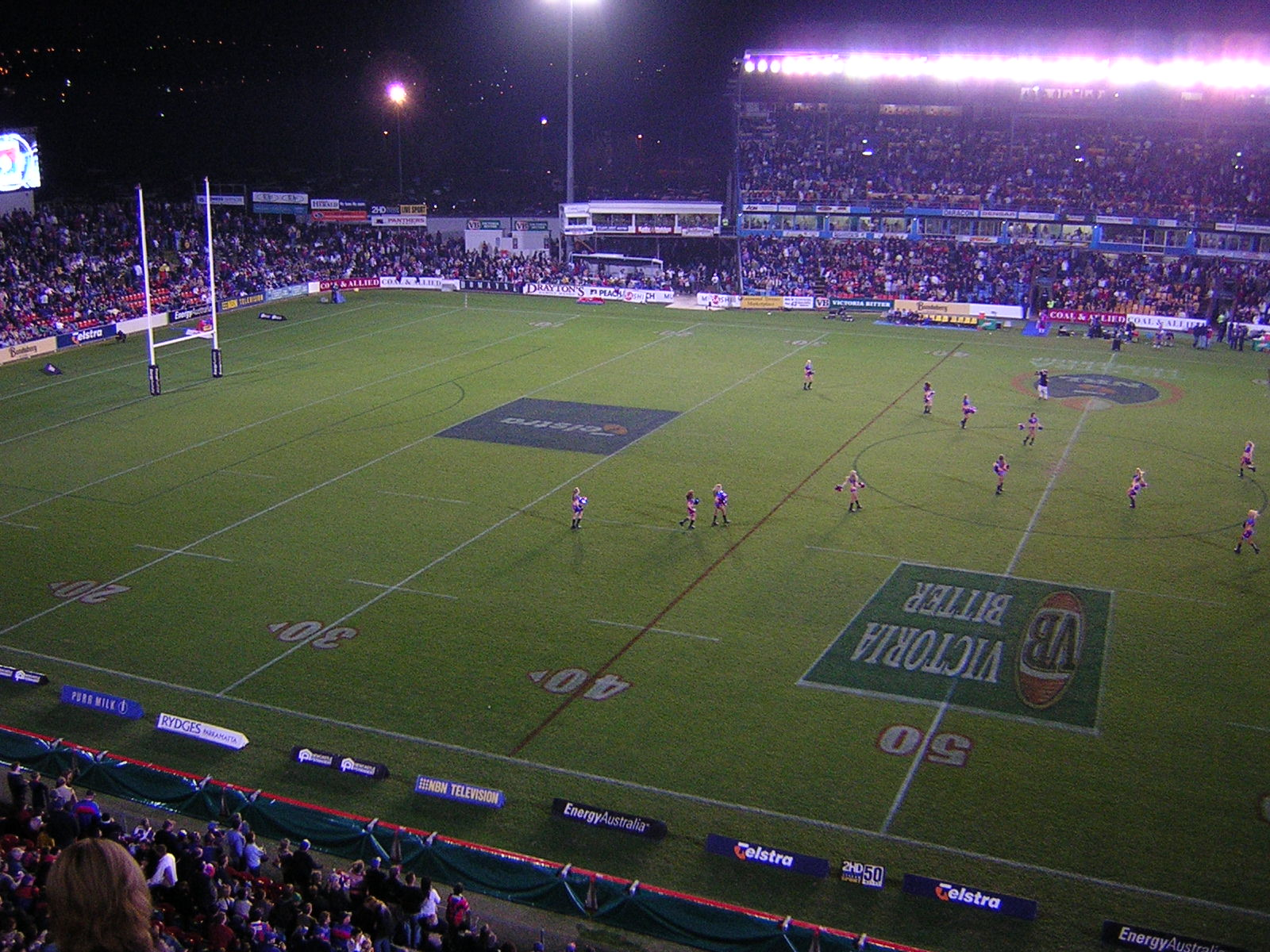
Newcastle International Sports Centre at night showing the old main grandstand

In 1998, the Newcastle club finished equal on competition points with the Brisbane Broncos, but finished second on points differential (sum of points scored minus points scored against). In 1999, the Knights lost their final two games of the regular season to finish 7th, before being knocked out a week later by the Parramatta Eels. The Knights came third in 2000, followed by a National Rugby League Premiership victory over the Parramatta Eels in 2001, with Andrew Johns winning the Clive Churchill Medal.

Andrew Johns won the Dally M Medal for best player in the National Rugby League twice in a row in 1998 and 1999, and won an unprecedented third Dally M Medal in 2002. In addition, Johns also won the Provan-Summons Medal (the people's choice award for player of the year) four years in a row from 1998 to 2001, the best performance by any player in the history of the award.

The club failed to win a single match in the first half of the 2005 premiership, losing 13 consecutive matches, which was the worst start to a season by any club since the 1960s. In 2006, the Knights finished the season in fourth position, a stunning reversal in form, but were eliminated from the finals after losing in the semi-final to the Brisbane Broncos, going down 50–6.

Chart of yearly table positions for Newcastle Knights in First Grade Rugby League

Prior to the 2006 NRL season kick-off, it was announced that the club's longest serving coach, Michael Hagan, would depart the club following the 2006 season to begin a three-year contract with the Parramatta Eels. Ironically, during the week of the 2006 season-opening game against Parramatta, the Newcastle outfit confirmed Parramatta coach Brian Smith would take over coaching duties in 2007.

The 2007 NRL season was a year of turmoil for the club, both on and off the field. After making a promising start to the season with victories over contenders such as the Canterbury-Bankstown Bulldogs – the club and rugby league world was rocked by the shock retirement of Andrew Johns. The departure of their captain and most influential player had an obvious effect on the team, and although they managed to stay in touch with the top eight until the last third of the season, their season was irreparably damaged by his absence. In addition to this, the Knights endured the worst injury toll in the 2007 season, fielding thirty-seven players in first grade by season's end.

The club also struggled off-field, with Brian Smith's decision to release players such as Clint Newton, Kirk Reynoldson, and Josh Perry. Newton took a contract at Melbourne, and Reynoldson threatened legal action over the club's refusal to play him in the fifteen games required to trigger his fourth contract.

Before the final round of 2007, Tab Sportsbet's Glenn Munsie was reported in the Daily Telegraph saying that the Newcastle side were certainties for the 'wooden spoon' (coming last in the season) and "it was pointless taking money on the wooden spoon gong given Newcastle would be firmly planted at the bottom of the ladder by the end of the weekend". Despite these pressures, the Knights managed to avoid a second wooden spoon in three years – offloading the dreaded piece of 'silverware' to the Penrith Panthers with a last round victory over the Wests Tigers.

2008 was a resurgence year for the Novocastrians, as they narrowly missed out on the finals. Newcastle started the 2009 NRL season convincingly, equaling their best home winning streak of nine wins in 1995. Towards the end of the season, coach Brian Smith announced he was leaving Newcastle to join the troubled Sydney Roosters in 2010. Over the next few weeks, assistant coach Rick Stone was announced as the new coach of the Newcastle club. Toward the end of the season, the Knights lost three games in a row, which put them in doubt for the finals. They then had an outstanding comeback to beat eventual grand finalists, Parramatta up the ladder. They finished the year 7th out of 16 after losing to the Canterbury-Bankstown Bulldogs in week one of the finals.

On 16 December 2009, it was announced that player Danny Wicks was caught up in a drug issue involving amphetamines, cocaine and ecstasy. He was stood down from the club. Wicks' contract was terminated. For the 2010 NRL season Newcastle signed McDonald's and Coca-Cola as major sponsors. In March 2010, Chris Houston was served with notice to attend court on charges of supplying ecstasy and cocaine. He was stood down indefinitely. June 2010 signalled a good period for the Knights after they confirmed the signings of 2009 Toyota Cup Player of the Year Beau Henry on a three-year contract, 2009 Toyota Cup Centre of the Year Siuatonga Likiliki on a two-year contract and former Australian international prop Antonio Kaufusi on a two-year contract. In the next few days, the Knights also confirmed the signings of current Queensland Maroons star Neville Costigan on a three-year contract, and the promising young backrower Kyle O'Donnell on a two-year contract.

The Knights finished 11th in 2010. While the club did not play in the finals, Adam MacDougall recorded the most tries for the club, and Akuila Uate equalled the most tries in a season. In December 2010, former Newcastle player Chris Houston was cleared of all drug charges and re-signed with the club for two years. In March 2011, Newcastle were officially taken over by mining magnate Nathan Tinkler after a member's vote in which Tinkler won by 97%. In April 2011, Newcastle confirmed the signing of Wayne Bennett. The Knights finished 8th in 2011, being eliminated in the first week of the finals. After the 2011 season, the Knights cleaned out 15 players, but nine other renowned players were signed, including club legends Danny Buderus and Timana Tahu, Kangaroos winger Darius Boyd and Kangaroos forward Kade Snowden.

The Newcastle club celebrated 25 years in the NRL competition in 2012. Captain Kurt Gidley succumbed to a shoulder injury early in the season, which resulted in him missing the remainder of the year. The team failed to click and won only 10 of their 24 games to finish 12th. During the year, the club signed Willie Mason and Dane Gagai.

Newcastle finished 7th on the ladder and made it to the third week of the finals by beating the Melbourne Storm in Melbourne in the second week of the finals. Newcastle were defeated the following week by the Sydney Roosters in the preliminary final 40–14.

In round 3 of the 2014 NRL Season, Newcastle played against the Melbourne Storm at AAMI Park. Shortly before half-time, Newcastle forward Alex McKinnon was involved in a three-man tackle that involved Jordan McLean and the Bromwich brothers (Jesse and Kenny). McKinnon suffered fractures to his C4 and C5 vertebrae. Later in Round 19, the NRL held the 'Rise for Alex Round', where for every ticket sold, $1 would be donated to McKinnon to assist with his continuous medical bills and rehabilitation funds.

On 7 July 2015 coach Rick Stone was sacked after a string of disappointing results, and Danny Buderus would coach for the remainder of the 2015 season. In round 26 against Penrith, Newcastle went down 30–12 to claim their second wooden spoon.

In September 2015, Newcastle signed Nathan Brown to a three-year contract to coach starting from 2016. During the 2016 season, the club debuted 11 players in the NRL, while losing co-captain Tariq Sims midway through the year to go to St. George Illawarra. Against Cronulla in round 10, Newcastle were defeated 62–0, their biggest defeat at home and second biggest defeat in history. Newcastle would only win one game all year, to claim the wooden spoon for a second consecutive season, and third overall.

2017 was the Knights' 30th year in the NRL where they finished last again, claiming their third Wooden Spoon in a row.

In December 2017, the Newcastle Knights expressed their interest in applying for a licence to participate in the inaugural NRL Women's season.

In November 2017, the club was sold to The Wests Group, a Newcastle-based not for profit club, after being administered by the NRL since the departure of Nathan Tinkler. The following season marked a resurgence for the club, with the arrivals of high-profile halfback Mitchell Pearce, sought after rookie fullback Kalyn Ponga, as well as Queensland Origin representative Aidan Guerra and several other players. The team started the season strongly, winning five of their opening eight games to sit comfortably inside the top 8. However, with a long-term injury to Mitchell Pearce, the side won only four of their remaining 12 matches to finish 11th.

2019 saw the arrival of forwards David Klemmer and Tim Glasby, boosting the team's forward pack. After winning their opening match, Newcastle lost five consecutive games before reversing their fortunes with five consecutive victories to reach 4th place. The Knights would finish in 11th place. In the 2020 season, Newcastle would reach the finals for the first time since 2013 after finishing 7th on the table. Newcastle were eliminated in the first week of the finals by South Sydney, losing 46–20.

In 2021, Newcastle would reach the finals once again, finishing 7th on the table. For the second straight year, they would go out in the first week of the finals, losing to Parramatta 28–20.

In 2022, the Newcastle side finished 14th on the table, winning six games for the entire year.

In round 18 of the 2023 NRL season, Newcastle recorded their biggest ever victory as a club when they defeated Canterbury 66–0. Newcastle would end up finishing the 2023 NRL season in 5th place after winning nine straight matches, coming from 14th on the table after round 17. In week one of the finals, Newcastle defeated Canberra in extra time 30–28. In week two, Newcastle would lose 40–10 against the New Zealand Warriors, which ended their season.

In the 2024 NRL season, Newcastle finished in 8th place on the table and qualified for the finals. They would be eliminated in week one of the finals series by North Queensland.

In the 2025 NRL season, Newcastle started the season brightly, winning their opening two matches. The club then went on a five-game losing streak after this. Newcastle would then only manage to record wins over State of Origin and injury-ravaged South Sydney and Penrith sides. Towards the back end of the season, Adam O'Brien announced he was stepping down as Newcastle head coach. Newcastle finished in last place after losing the final game of the season against the Parramatta Eels 66-10, claiming their 5th Wooden Spoon. The loss also meant that Newcastle had lost nine games in a row to close out the year. Newcastle also were held scoreless in eleven of their matches at half-time.

In the 2026 NRL Season, Newcastle finished 7th on the table and qualified for the finals. The club would then upset South Sydney, New Zealand Warriors and Penrith to make the grand final. In the preliminary final against Penrith, Newcastle played for over 40 minutes with 12 men on the field after Phoenix Crossland was sent off. In the grand final, Newcastle took a 12-0 lead but eventually lost 19-18 against the Sydney Roosters. Newcastle became just the fifth team to make the grand final after finishing as wooden spooners the year before.

== Emblem and colours ==
Newcastle Knights - Logos

1988–1997

1998–2007

2008–2019

2020–Present

In 1988, the Newcastle Knights were re-established to represent rugby league in the Hunter region once more. Newcastle adopted 'The Knights' moniker as a reference to its 'steel city' industrial heritage. The jersey colours of red and blue were adopted from the district's representative side that wore red jerseys, white shorts and blue socks.

Newcastle Knights - Jerseys

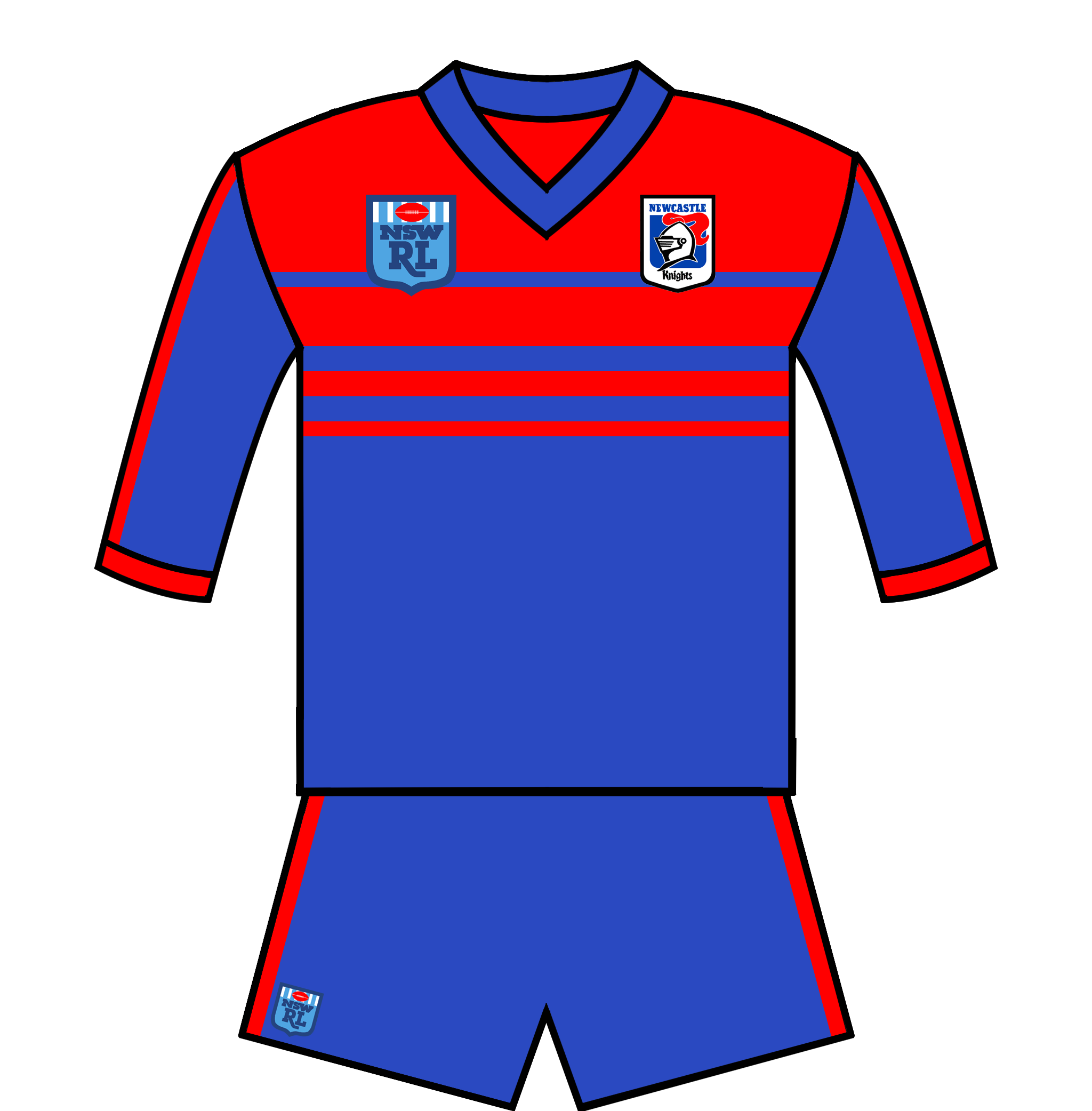
1988–1991

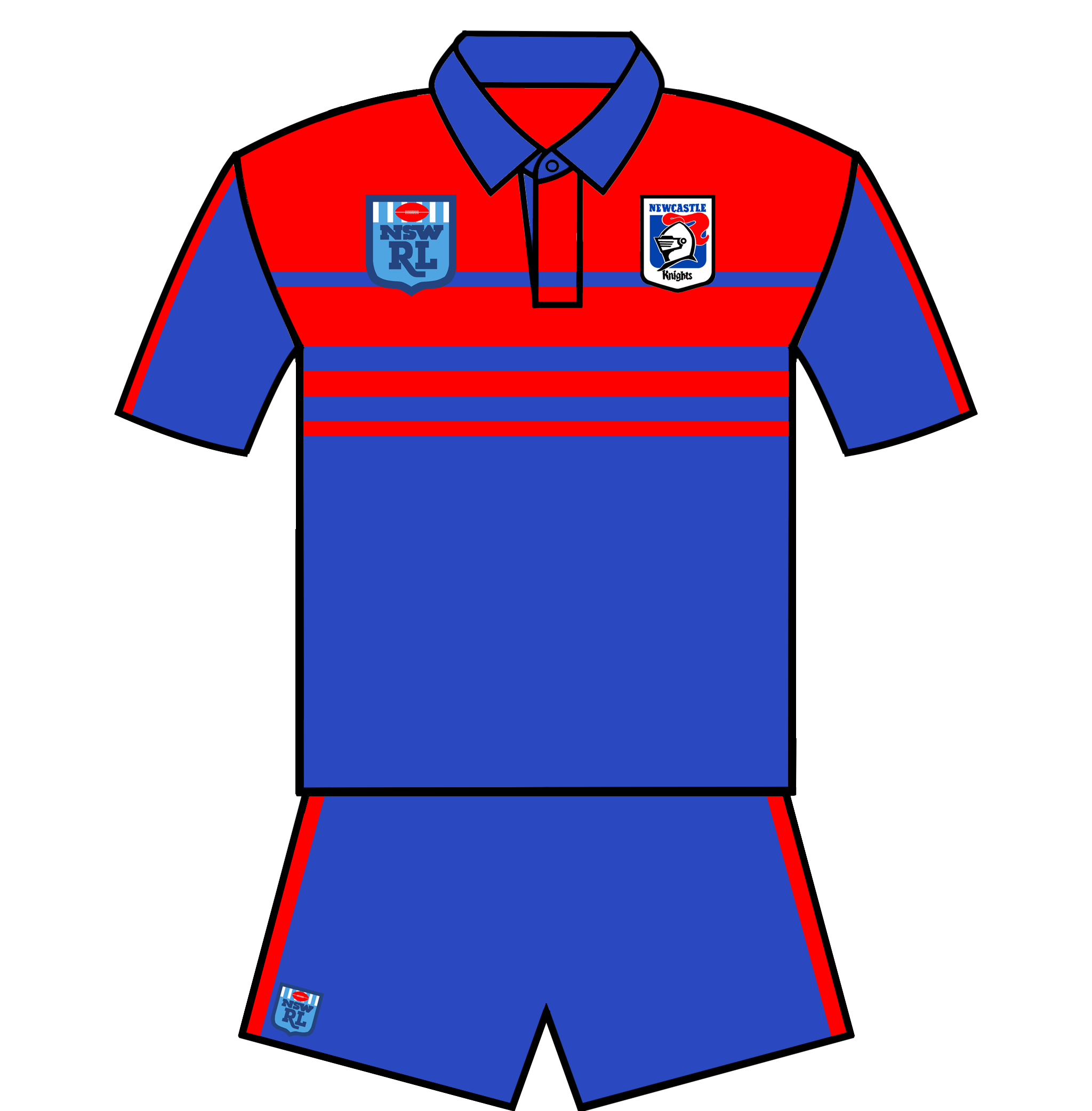
1992–1996

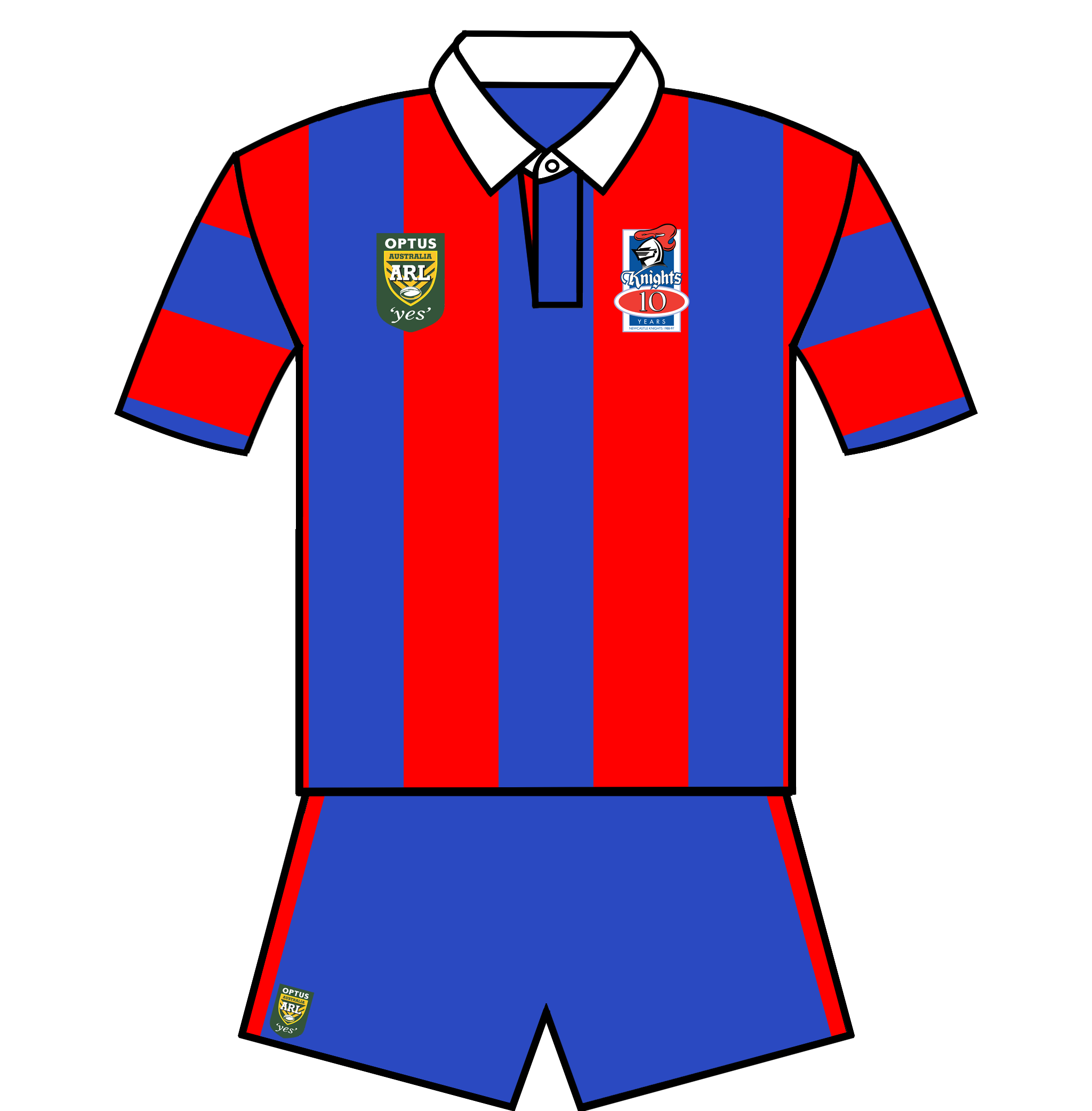
1997–2000

== Players ==
=== Current squad ===
Newcastle Knights 2026 squad
| Top 30 squad - 2026 NRL season | | | Development list | Coaching staff |
|---|---|---|---|---|
| Matt Arthur – HK; Bradman Best – CE; Dylan Brown – HB; Tom Cant – SR; Mat Croker – LK; Phoenix Crossland – HK; Lachlan Crouch – PR; Wilson De Courcey – CE; Tyson Frizell – LK; Dane Gagai – CE | Tyson Gamble – FE; Peter Hola – PR; Cody Hopwood – PR; Brodie Jones – PR; Asu Kepaoa – SR; Dylan Lucas – SR; Francis Manuleleua – SR; Greg Marzhew – WG; Jermaine McEwen – SR; Trey Mooney – PR | Kalyn Ponga (c) – FB; Jacob Saifiti – PR; Elijah Salesa-Leaumoana – LK; Pasami Saulo – PR; James Schiller – WG; Fletcher Sharpe – FE, FB; Sandon Smith – HB, FE; Wil Sullivan – PR; Dominic Young – WG | Harrison Graham – HK; Fletcher Hunt – FB, CE; Matthew Hunter – HB; Kyle McCarthy – CE; Connor Votano – FB | Head coach: Justin Holbrook; Assistant coaches: Brett White - Defence; Steven Hales - Attack; Danny Buderus; Matt Lantry - Pathways; Michael Dobson - NSW Cup Coach; Alex Moore - Jersey Flegg coach; Will Markwick - NRL Head of Performance; Chris James - Director of Football; Legend: (c) Captain(s); (vc) Vice-captain(s); Updated: 20 November 2026; Source(s): Newcastle Knights Profiles, Rugby League Project |

=== Captains ===
All players who have captained the Newcastle Knights in first-grade.

| Cap No. | Name | Years As Captain | Debut Round | Games As Captain |
|---|---|---|---|---|
| 1. | Sam Stewart | 1988–90 | Round 1 | 40 |
| 2. | Glenn Miller | 1988 | Round 17 | 3 |
| 3. | Michael Hagan | 1989–93 | Round 15 | 91 |
| 4. | Peter Johnston | 1990 | Round 8 | 1 |
| 5. | Mark Sargent | 1994–95 | Round 1 | 26 |
| 6. | Robbie McCormack | 1994 | Round 4 | 3 |
| 7. | Paul Harragon | 1995–99 | Round 7 | 71 |
| 8. | Matthew Johns | 1995–99 | Round 18 | 21 |
| 9. | Tony Butterfield | 1997, 1999–00 | Round 3 | 46 |
| 10. | Andrew Johns | 1998, 2000–07 | Round 23 | 106 |
| 11. | Bill Peden | 2000–02 | Round 10 | 13 |
| 12. | Ben Kennedy | 2001, 2003–04 | Round 24 | 9 |
| 13. | Matt Parsons | 2002–03 | Finals Week 2 | 5 |
| 14. | Steve Simpson | 2003, 2006–10 | Round 15 | 18 |
| 15. | Danny Buderus | 2004–08, 2012 | Round 7 | 67 |
| 16. | Robbie O'Davis | 2004 | Round 14 | 1 |
| 17. | Matthew Gidley | 2004–05 | Round 17 | 2 |
| 18. | Craig Smith | 2005 | Round 14 | 3 |
| 19. | Jarrod Mullen | 2007, 2010–11, 2013–14 | Round 11 | 21 |
| 20. | Kirk Reynoldson | 2007 | Round 13 | 1 |
| 21. | Adam Woolnough | 2007 | Round 16 | 1 |
| 22. | Kurt Gidley | 2007–15 | Round 19 | 123 |
| 23. | Chris Houston | 2008–09, 2012–13 | Round 13 | 5 |
| 24. | Daniel Tolar | 2010 | Round 14 | 1 |
| 25. | Wes Naiqama | 2011 | Round 16 | 2 |
| 26. | Beau Scott | 2015 | Round 1 | 2 |
| 27. | Trent Hodkinson | 2016–17 | Round 1 | 30 |
| 28. | Jeremy Smith | 2016 | Round 1 | 21 |
| 29. | Tariq Sims | 2016 | Round 6 | 8 |
| 30. | Sione Mata'utia | 2017 | Round 8 | 15 |
| 31. | Jamie Buhrer | 2017–19 | Round 18 | 30 |
| 32. | Mitchell Pearce | 2018–20 | Round 1 | 59 |
| 33. | Aidan Guerra | 2018 | Round 8 | 9 |
| 34. | Shaun Kenny-Dowall | 2019 | Round 16 | 1 |
| 35. | Jayden Brailey | 2021–24 | Round 1 | 38 |
| 36. | Daniel Saifiti | 2021 | Round 1 | 17 |
| 37. | Kalyn Ponga | 2021–24 | Round 21 | 55 |
| 38. | Tyson Frizell | 2022–24 | Round 2 | 35 |
| 39. | Dane Gagai | 2023–24 | Round 3 | 5 |
| 40. | Jackson Hastings | 2023 | Round 3 | 1 |
| 41. | Jacob Saifiti | 2023 | Round 27 | 1 |

=== Team of the Era ===
In August 2007, the Knights announced their team of 20 years. This team was:

Newcastle Knights – Team of the Era (1988–2007)
| Starting 13 | Reserves | Coach |
|---|---|---|
| 68 Robbie O'Davis – FB; 128 Timana Tahu – WG; 98 Matthew Gidley – CE; 108 Mark Hughes – CE; 102 Adam MacDougall – WG; 73 Matthew Johns – FE; 75 Andrew Johns – HB; 39 Mark Sargent – PR; 103 Danny Buderus – HK; 35 Paul Harragon – PR; 126 Steve Simpson – SR; 130 Ben Kennedy – SR; 26 Marc Glanville – LK | 37 Michael Hagan; 143 Kurt Gidley; 2 Tony Butterfield; 70 Adam Muir | Head coach: Mal Reilly; Legend: (c) Captain(s); (vc) Vice-captain(s) |

== Coaches ==
- Allan McMahon (1988 – 30 June 1991)
- David Waite (5 July 1991 – 1994)
- Mal Reilly (1995–1998)
- Warren Ryan (1999–2000)
- Michael Hagan (2001–2006)
- Brian Smith (2007 – 14 August 2009)
- Rick Stone (15 August 2009 – 2011)
- Wayne Bennett (2012–2014)
- Rick Stone (2015 – 26 July 2015)
- Danny Buderus (27 July 2015 – 5 September 2015)
- Nathan Brown (2016 – 26 August 2019)
- Kristian Woolf (27 August 2019 – 8 September 2019)
- Adam O'Brien (2020 – September 2025)
- Justin Holbrook (September 2025 - present)

== Jersey ==
=== Manufacturers ===
- Good Fellows (1988–94)
- Peerless (1995–1996)
- Canterbury (1997–1999)
- Fila (2000–2001)
- ISC (2002–2007)
- KooGa (2008–2010)
- XBlades (2011)
- ISC (2012–2019)
- O'Neills (2020–2022)
- Classic Sportswear (2023–present)

=== Home jerseys ===
| 1988–1996 | 1997–2000 | 2001–2004 | 2005–2007 |
| 2008–2010 | 2011–2012 | 2013–2014 | 2015–2016 |
| 2017–2018 | 2019–present | | |

=== Away jerseys ===
| 2000–2002 | 2003–2005 | 2006–2007 | 2008–2009 |
| 2010–2011 | 2012 | 2013 | 2014–2015 |
| 2016–2018 | | | |

=== Other jerseys ===
| 1988 Trial | 2008 Heritage | 2009–2011 Heritage | 2012 Heritage |
| 2014 Women in League | 2015 Heritage | | |

== Record ==
=== Head-to-head records ===
| Opponent | Played | Won | Drawn | Lost | Win % |
|---|---|---|---|---|---|
| Dolphins | 6 | 5 | 0 | 1 | 83.33 |
| Rabbitohs | 49 | 30 | 0 | 19 | 61.22 |
| Tigers | 41 | 22 | 0 | 19 | 53.66 |
| Titans | 32 | 17 | 0 | 15 | 53.13 |
| Eels | 61 | 31 | 1 | 29 | 50.82 |
| Sharks | 63 | 32 | 1 | 30 | 50.79 |
| Cowboys | 48 | 23 | 0 | 25 | 47.92 |
| Warriors | 54 | 25 | 1 | 28 | 46.30 |
| Raiders | 62 | 28 | 2 | 32 | 45.16 |
| Bulldogs | 60 | 27 | 1 | 32 | 45.00 |
| Panthers | 59 | 25 | 4 | 30 | 42.37 |
| Sea Eagles | 63 | 26 | 1 | 36 | 41.27 |
| Storm | 49 | 17 | 0 | 32 | 34.69 |
| Roosters | 63 | 21 | 2 | 40 | 33.33 |
| Dragons | 45 | 15 | 0 | 30 | 33.33 |
| Broncos | 57 | 17 | 1 | 39 | 29.82 |

| Games | Wins | Drawn | Losses |
|---|---|---|---|
| 886 | 415 | 18 | 453 |

Last updated on 3 March 2023. Source:

=== Summary ===
| Competition | Regular season | | | | | Finals progression | Season |
| Competition | Pld | W | D | L | Pos. | Finals progression | Season |
|---|---|---|---|---|---|---|---|
| 1988 NSW Rugby League | 22 | 5 | 1 | 16 | 14/16 | —N/a | |
| 1989 NSW Rugby League | 22 | 11 | 0 | 11 | 7/16 | —N/a | |
| 1990 NSW Rugby League | 22 | 13 | 2 | 7 | 6/16 | PO | |
| 1991 NSW Rugby League | 22 | 6 | 3 | 13 | 13/16 | —N/a | |
| 1992 NSW Rugby League | 22 | 12 | 2 | 8 | 4/16 | SF | |
| 1993 NSW Rugby League | 22 | 10 | 0 | 12 | 9/16 | —N/a | |
| 1994 NSW Rugby League | 22 | 9 | 0 | 13 | 10/16 | —N/a | |
| 1995 Australian Rugby League | 22 | 15 | 0 | 7 | 5/20 | PF | |
| 1996 Australian Rugby League | 21 | 10 | 1 | 10 | 9/20 | —N/a | |
| 1997 Australian Rugby League | 22 | 14 | 1 | 7 | 2/12 | F (W) | |
| 1998 National Rugby League | 24 | 18 | 1 | 5 | 2/20 | SF | |
| 1999 National Rugby League | 24 | 14 | 1 | 9 | 7/17 | QF | |
| 2000 National Rugby League | 26 | 15 | 1 | 10 | 3/14 | PF | |
| 2001 National Rugby League | 26 | 16 | 1 | 9 | 3/14 | F (W) | |
| 2002 National Rugby League | 24 | 17 | 0 | 7 | 2/15 | SF | |
| 2003 National Rugby League | 24 | 14 | 0 | 10 | 7/15 | QF | |
| 2004 National Rugby League | 24 | 10 | 0 | 14 | 10/15 | —N/a | |
| 2005 National Rugby League | 24 | 8 | 0 | 16 | 15/15 | —N/a | overview |
| 2006 National Rugby League | 24 | 14 | 0 | 10 | 4/15 | SF | overview |
| 2007 National Rugby League | 24 | 9 | 0 | 15 | 15/16 | —N/a | overview |
| 2008 National Rugby League | 24 | 12 | 0 | 12 | 9/16 | —N/a | overview |
| 2009 National Rugby League | 24 | 13 | 0 | 11 | 7/16 | QF | overview |
| 2010 National Rugby League | 24 | 10 | 0 | 14 | 11/16 | —N/a | overview |
| 2011 National Rugby League | 24 | 12 | 0 | 12 | 8/16 | QF | overview |
| 2012 National Rugby League | 24 | 10 | 0 | 14 | 12/16 | —N/a | overview |
| 2013 National Rugby League | 24 | 12 | 1 | 11 | 7/16 | PF | overview |
| 2014 National Rugby League | 24 | 10 | 0 | 14 | 12/16 | —N/a | overview |
| 2015 National Rugby League | 24 | 8 | 0 | 16 | 16/16 | —N/a | overview |
| 2016 National Rugby League | 24 | 1 | 1 | 22 | 16/16 | —N/a | overview |
| 2017 National Rugby League | 24 | 5 | 0 | 19 | 16/16 | —N/a | overview |
| 2018 National Rugby League | 24 | 9 | 0 | 15 | 11/16 | —N/a | overview |
| 2019 National Rugby League | 24 | 10 | 0 | 14 | 11/16 | —N/a | overview |
| 2020 National Rugby League | 20 | 11 | 1 | 8 | 7/16 | EF | overview |
| 2021 National Rugby League | 24 | 12 | 0 | 12 | 7/16 | EF | overview |
| 2022 National Rugby League | 24 | 6 | 0 | 18 | 14/16 | —N/a | overview |
| 2023 National Rugby League | 24 | 14 | 1 | 9 | 5/17 | SF | overview |
| 2024 National Rugby League | 24 | 12 | 0 | 12 | 8/17 | EF | overview |
| 2025 National Rugby League | 24 | 6 | 0 | 18 | 17/17 | —N/a | overview |
| 2026 National Rugby League | 24 | 14 | 0 | 10 | 7/17 | F (L) | overview |

== Major sponsors ==
- Henny Penny (1988–1990)
- BP (1991–1993)
- Stockland (1995–1997)
- Impulse Airlines (1998–2001)
- Flight Centre (2001)
- QantasLink (2002–2004)
- Coal & Allied (2005–2011)
- Hunter Ports (2012–2014)
- Newpave Asphalt (2015–2016)
- nib Health Funds (2017–present)
- Palmerbet (2021–present)

== Club Premiership honours ==
Premierships: 2 (1997*, 2001) Finals Series: 17 (1992, 1995, 1997*, 1998, 1999, 2000, 2001, 2002, 2003, 2006, 2009, 2011, 2013, 2020, 2021, 2023, 2024, 2026) * ARL season only

== Statistics ==
=== Individual records ===
==== Career ====
Most Games

- Danny Buderus 257

Most Points

- Andrew Johns 2,176

Most Tries

- Akuila Uate 110

Most Goals

- Andrew Johns 917

==== Season ====
Most Points

- Andrew Johns (2001) 279

Most Tries

- Dom Young (2023) 23

==== Match ====
Most Points

- Andrew Johns (Rd 21, 2001) 34 v Canberra

Most Tries

- Edrick Lee (Rd 16, 2022) 5 v Gold Coast
- Greg Marzhew (Rd 8, 2026) 5 v St. George Illawarra Dragons

Most Goals

- Kalyn Ponga (Rd 18, 2023) 11 v Canterbury-Bankstown
- Andrew Johns (Rd 2, 2006) 11 v Canberra

== Club song ==
Go Hard, Go Knights (1995–present)

Playin' hard, playin' tough,
Just plain good is not good enough,
We're gonna show you what league's all about,
If there's a lesson to be learned we're handing it out.

This game is our game,
This town is our town,
Turn the heat up and listen to the crowd.
Go hard, Go Knights, Go proud.

This game is our game,
This town is our town,
Turn the heat up and listen to the crowd.
Go hard, Go Knights, Go proud.

== Supporters ==
Newcastle Knights fans have been described as being among the most rabid in the NRL and in 2008, 2011 and 2012, were the third best supported club in the league. In 2008, the average home game attendance was 18,750, 19,186 in 2011 and 20,919 in 2012. In 2012, the Knights also had the largest Monday Night Football crowd of the year with 18,637 fans turning up in Round 16.

Some notable supporters of the club include;

- Kim Beazley, former Australian politician, former Opposition Leader
- Catherine Britt, Australian musician
- Dr. Chris Brown, Australian celebrity veterinarian
- Tim Clark, Australian jockey
- Michael Costa, former Australian politician
- Brad Cranfield & Lara Welham, The Block Season 5 winners
- Iva Davies, Australian musician
- James Duckworth, former Australian tennis player
- Morgan Evans, Australian country singer
- Kurt Fearnley, Australian paralympian
- Joel Fitzgibbon, former Australian politician
- Thomas Fraser-Holmes, former Australian swimmer
- Adam Gilchrist, Australian cricketer and sportscaster
- Ben Gillies, Australian musician
- Sharon Grierson, former Australian politician
- Jennifer Hawkins, former Miss Universe
- Josh Hazlewood, Australian cricketer
- Daniel Johns, Australian musician
- Barnaby Joyce, Australian politician, former Deputy Prime Minister
- Sophie Lee, Australian actress and author
- Greg Matthews, Australian cricketer and sportscaster
- Mark McGowan, 30th Premier of Western Australia
- Jack Newton, former Australian golfer
- Josh Pyke, Australian musician
- Mike Rabbitt, Australian sports journalist
- Mark Richards, Australian surfer
- Ben Simmons, professional basketball player for the Brooklyn Nets of the NBA
- Warren Smith, Surfest organiser
- John Stuart Tate, Lord City Mayor of Newcastle
- Nathan Tinkler, Australian mining magnate
- Jane Turner, Australian actress
- Corey Tutt, Young Australian of the year NSW 2020 and Charity founder
- Felicity Ward, Australian comedian
- Paul Wilson, former Australian cricketer and umpire
- Sam Worthington, English-Australian actor

== Women's team ==
On 11 June 2021, the Newcastle Knights were granted a licence to compete in the 2021 National Rugby League Women's (NRLW) competition. Recently retired Knights player Blake Green was announced as the head coach. The season was planned to commence in August 2021, postponed to October 2021 and further postponed to 2022 due to the ongoing COVID-19 pandemic.

On 1 July 2021, the Knights announced their first ever NRLW signing in Indigenous All Stars and Prime Minister's XIII representative Caitlan Johnston, who was a foundation Tarsha Gale Cup player for the Knights in 2018 before spending two seasons with the Sydney Roosters NRLW side.

On 25 November 2021, it was announced that Knights Tarsha Gale Cup coach Casey Bromilow would be taking on the head coach role after Green had been appointed into a specialist halves role alongside Andrew Johns with Newcastle's NRL side. Jess Skinner was announced as the assistant coach. On the same day, the Knights announced a further six Newcastle and Hunter based signings in Bobbi Law from the Sydney Roosters, Jayme Fressard from the Brisbane Broncos and Georgia Page from the St. George Illawarra Dragons, as well as Phoebe Desmond, Chantelle Graham and Kyra Simon from local teams. Six development players were also announced in Bree Chester, Sophie Clancy, Matilda Jones, Kayla Romaniuk, Jesse Southwell and Tylah Vallance.

On 1 December 2021, the Knights signed nine Kiwi Ferns representatives in Ngatokotoru Arakua, Maitua Feterika, Annetta Nu'uausala, Charntay Poko, Krystal Rota, Charlotte Scanlan, Autumn-Rain Stephens-Daly, Katelyn Vaha'akolo and Kararaina Wira-Kohu, Two days later, the club signed Romy Teitzel from the Brisbane Broncos, AFLW player Paige Parker, rugby sevens player Emma Sykes and North Queensland Gold Stars players Rangimarie Edwards-Bruce, Katie Green, Emma Manzelmann and Tahlulah Tillett.

In January 2022, the Knights signed Kirra Dibb from the New Zealand Warriors after Emma Sykes withdrew from the squad. On 21 February, the 24-woman squad was finalised with the signing of Shannon Evans from the Central Coast Roosters and Romy Teitzel was named team captain, Caitlan Johnston and Krystal Rota named as club captains.

The club played in 5 matches without a win in its inaugural season.

In April 2022, Ronald Griffiths was announced as the new head coach for the upcoming season.

On 18 May 2022, the Knights announced the signing of Australian Jillaroos players Millie Boyle and Tamika Upton for their second season in the competition. Additional notable signings for the 2022 season were Sydney Roosters premiership winning players Yasmin Clydsdale, Olivia Higgins, Simone Karpani, Tayla Predebon, Hannah Southwell, former Jillaroos player Caitlin Moran and former Roosters players Shanice Parker and Kiana Takairangi.

On 16 August 2022, Millie Boyle and Hannah Southwell were appointed co-captains of the club.

After winning 4 of their 5 regular-season games, the Knights won their first premiership during the 2022 NRL Women's season, defeating the Parramatta Eels 32–12.
