= Lachlan Crouch =

Australian rugby league footballer

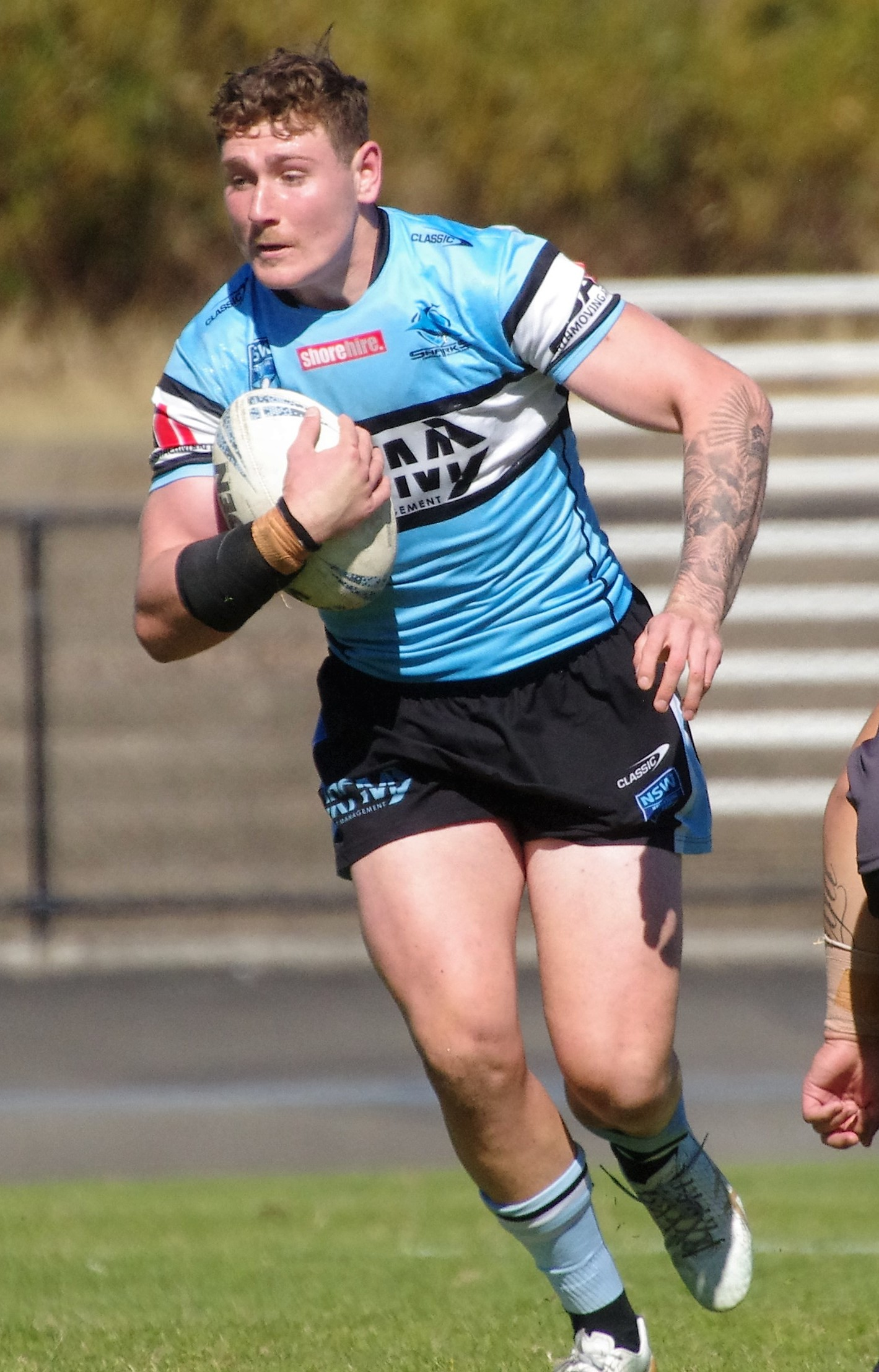

Personal information
- Born: 16 January 2003 (age 23) Maitland, New South Wales, Australia
- Height: 191 cm (6 ft 3 in)
- Weight: 106 kg (16 st 10 lb)

Playing information
- Position: Prop
Club
Years	Team	Pld	T	G	FG	P
2026–	Newcastle Knights	12	0	0	0	0
- Source: As of 4 October 2026

Lachlan Crouch (born 16 January 2003) is an Australian professional rugby league footballer who plays as a prop for the Newcastle Knights in the National Rugby League.

== Background ==
Born in Maitland, New South Wales, Crouch played his junior rugby league for the East Maitland Griffins, before being signed by the Newcastle Knights.

== Playing career ==
=== Early years ===
After starting in the junior ranks with the Newcastle Knights, Crouch joined the Cronulla-Sutherland Sharks in 2022.

In June 2025, he signed a 3-year contract to return to the Newcastle Knights starting in 2026.

=== 2026 ===
In round 18 of the 2026 NRL season, Crouch made his NRL debut for Newcastle against the Dolphins. Crouch played 12 matches for Newcastle in the 2026 NRL season including their 2026 NRL Grand Final loss to the Sydney Roosters.
