= Wilson De Courcey =

Australian rugby league player

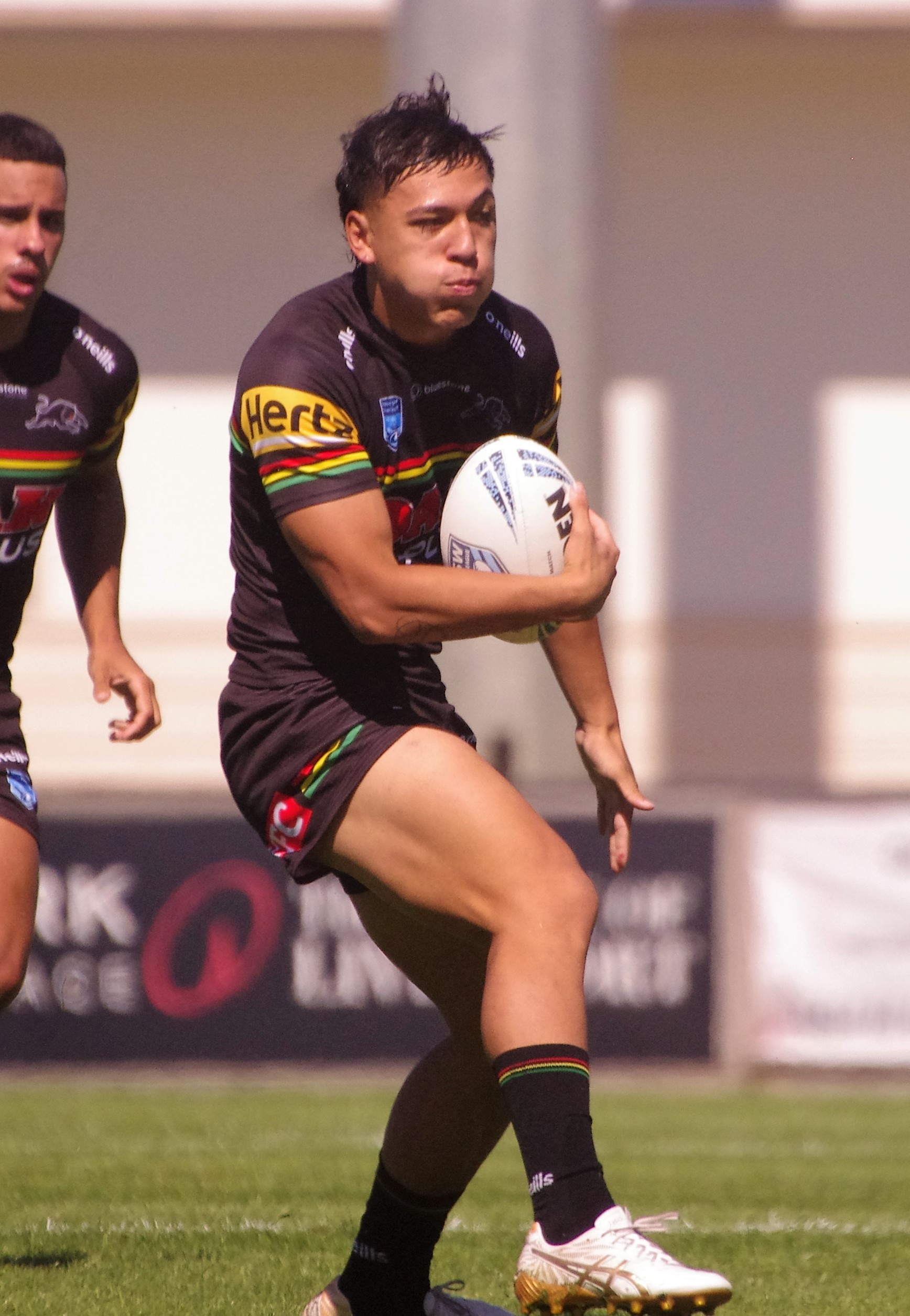

Personal information
- Born: 2 October 2005 (age 21) Sydney, New South Wales, Australia
- Height: 184 cm (6 ft 0 in)
- Weight: 100 kg (15 st 10 lb)

Playing information
- Position: Centre
Club
Years	Team	Pld	T	G	FG	P
2026	Newcastle Knights	2	0	0	0	0
2027–	Brisbane Broncos	0	0	0	0	0
	Total	2	0	0	0	0
- Source: As of 12 April 2026

Wilson De Courcey (born 2 October 2005) is an Australian professional rugby league footballer who currently plays for the Brisbane Broncos in the National Rugby League. His positions are centre and wing.

== Background ==
Born in Sydney, New South Wales, De Courcey played his junior rugby league for the St Clair Comets, before being signed by the Penrith Panthers.

== Playing career ==
=== Early years ===
De Courcey rose through the ranks for the Penrith Panthers, also representing the Australian Schoolboys in 2023.

In 2024, he joined the Newcastle Knights. In October 2024, he re-signed with the Knights on a 2-year contract until the end of 2026, the first year starting in the NRL development list, then in the Top 30 list the year after.

=== 2026 ===
In round 5 of the 2026 NRL season, De Courcey made his NRL debut for the Knights against the Canberra Raiders.

On 4 September 2026, it was announced that De Courcey signed a two year deal with the Broncos. On 19 October 2026, the Broncos officially announced that they had signed De Courcey.
