= Fletcher Hunt =

Australian rugby league player

Personal information
- Born: 26 December 2005 (age 20) Warren, New South Wales, Australia

Playing information
- Position: Fullback, Centre, Wing
Club
Years	Team	Pld	T	G	FG	P
2025–	Newcastle Knights	30	18	0	0	72
Representative
Years	Team	Pld	T	G	FG	P
2025	Prime Minister's XIII	1	0	0	0	0
- Source: As of 31 August 2026

Fletcher Hunt (born 26 December 2005) is an Australian professional rugby league footballer who plays as a fullback, centre and winger for the Newcastle Knights in the National Rugby League.

== Background ==
Born in Warren, New South Wales, Hunt played his junior rugby league for the Warren Bulldogs, before being signed by the Newcastle Knights. Hunt is also of Indigenous Australian descent.

== Playing career ==
=== Early years ===
Hunt spent some time with the Western Rams before rising through the ranks for the Newcastle Knights.

=== 2025 ===
In round 11 of the 2025 NRL season, Hunt made his NRL debut for Newcastle against the Parramatta Eels. On 13 June, Newcastle announced that Hunt had re-signed with the club until the end of the 2027 season. Hunt played 12 games for Newcastle in the 2025 NRL season which saw the club finish last on the table and claim the Wooden Spoon.
