= Kyle McCarthy (rugby league) =

Hong Kong rugby league player (born 2004)

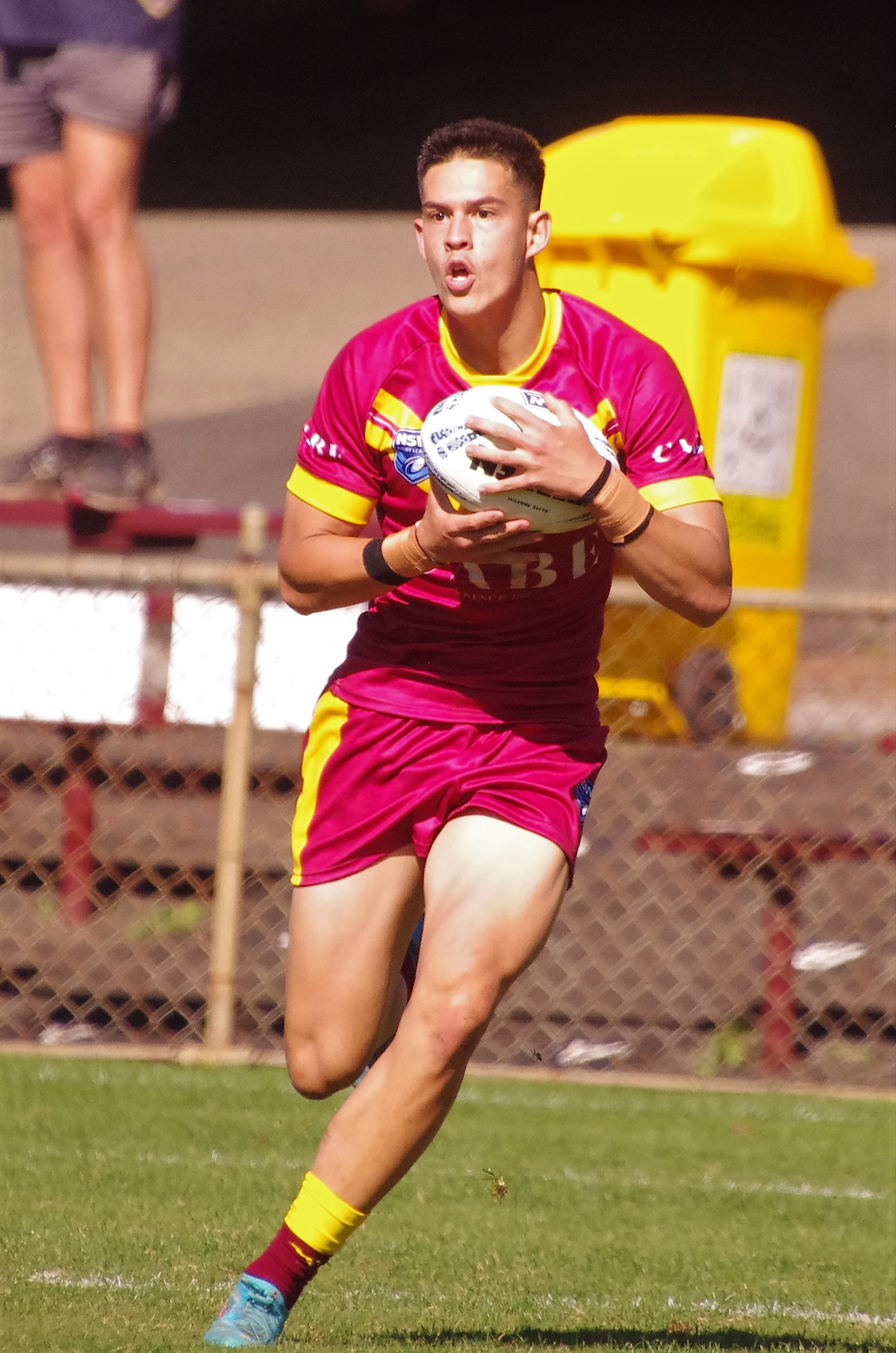

Personal information
- Born: 10 March 2004 (age 21) Hong Kong
- Height: 193 cm (6 ft 4 in)
- Weight: 98 kg (15 st 6 lb)

Playing information
- Position: Centre, Wing
Club
Years	Team	Pld	T	G	FG	P
2024–	Newcastle Knights	6	1	0	0	4
- Source: As of 27 July 2025

Kyle McCarthy (born 10 March 2004) is a professional rugby league footballer who plays as a centre and winger for the Newcastle Knights in the National Rugby League.

== Background ==
McCarthy although being born in Hong Kong he has a Filipino/Australian background .

== Playing career ==
=== Early years ===
In 2022, McCarthy played for the Illawarra South Coast Dragons. In 2023, he joined the Newcastle Knights.

=== 2024 ===
In round 24 of the 2024 NRL season, McCarthy made his NRL debut for the Knights against the Cronulla-Sutherland Sharks.
