= 2023 Newcastle Knights season =

National Rugby League NSW season

- NRL Rank: 5th
- 2023 record: Wins: 14; draws: 1; losses: 9
- Points scored: For: 645; against: 312

Team information
- CEO: Phil Gardner
- Coach: Adam O'Brien
- Captain: Jayden Brailey & Kalyn Ponga
- Stadium: McDonald Jones Stadium
- Avg. attendance: 21,312
- High attendance: 29,548

Top scorers
- Tries: Dom Young (25)
- Goals: Kalyn Ponga (45)
- Points: Kalyn Ponga (126)
← 2022	2024 →

The 2023 Newcastle Knights season was the 36th in the club's history. Coached by Adam O'Brien and co-captained by Jayden Brailey and Kalyn Ponga, they competed in the NRL's 2023 Telstra Premiership, finishing the regular season in 5th place (out of 17), thus reaching the finals. The Knights made it to the second week of finals, before being knocked out by the New Zealand Warriors.

== Squad ==
Newcastle Knights 2023 squad
2023 NRL top 30 squad			Development list	Coaching staff
235 Dane Gagai (vc) – CE, FB (gk); 261 Lachlan Fitzgibbon – SR; 268 Daniel Saifiti – PR; 269 Jacob Saifiti (vc) – PR; 296 Kalyn Ponga (c) – FB, FE (gk); 304 Hymel Hunt – WG; 305 David Klemmer – PR (pre-season loss); 307 Kurt Mann – LK, SR, HK; 310 Phoenix Crossland – HK, FE, LK; 311 Bradman Best – CE; 313 Jayden Brailey (c) – HK	315 Enari Tuala – WG, CE; 317 Chris Randall – HK (pre-season loss); 318 Brodie Jones – SR, LK, PR; 321 Tyson Frizell (vc) – SR; 323 Dom Young – WG; 325 Simi Sasagi – LK; 327 Mat Croker – PR, LK; 328 Jack Johns – LK; 330 Adam Clune – HB; 331 Leo Thompson – PR, LK; 333 Krystian Mapapalangi – CE	335 Adam Elliott – LK, HK; 336 Jackson Hastings (vc) – HB (gk); 337 Jack Hetherington – PR, LK; 338 Lachie Miller – FB (gk); 339 Tyson Gamble – FE, LK (gk); 340 Dylan Lucas – SR, CE; 343 Greg Marzhew – WG (pre-season signing); 344 Fa'amanu Brown – HK (mid-season signing); 000 Dane Aukafolau – SR (mid-season signing); 000 Bailey Hodgson – FB	334 Oryn Keeley – SR; Myles Martin – LK; Kobe Rugless – HK (mid-season loss); Tevita Toloi – SR (pre-season loss); Chris Vea'ila – CE (mid-season loss); Extended squad: 341 Ryan Rivett – FE, HK; 342 Tom Cant – LK; 345 Riley Jones – HK; David Armstrong – FB; Ben Talty – LK (mid-season loss)	Head coach: Adam O'Brien; Assistant coaches: Rory Kostjasyn; Brian McDermott; Michael Monaghan - NSW Cup coach; Tony Gleeson - Jersey Flegg Cup coach; Legend: (c) Captain(s); (vc) Vice-captain(s); Updated: 16 September 2023; Source(s): Newcastle Knights Profiles, Rugby League Project

== Transfers and re-signings ==
=== Gains ===
Player/Coach	Previous club	Length	Source
Dane Aukafolau	North Sydney Bears	2023	
Fa'amanu Brown	Canterbury-Bankstown Bulldogs	2023	
Adam Elliott	Canberra Raiders	2025	
Tyson Gamble	Brisbane Broncos	2024	
Jackson Hastings	Wests Tigers	2025	
Jack Hetherington	Canterbury-Bankstown Bulldogs	2025	
Greg Marzhew	Gold Coast Titans	2025	
Brian McDermott (assistant coach)	Fiji national rugby league team	2023	
Lachie Miller	Cronulla-Sutherland Sharks	2025	
Michael Monaghan (NSW Cup coach)	Manly Warringah Sea Eagles	2023	
Ryan Rivett	Cronulla-Sutherland Sharks	2023	

=== Losses ===
Player/Coach	Club	Source
Mitchell Barnett	New Zealand Warriors	
Jake Clifford	Hull F.C.	
Tex Hoy	Hull F.C.	
Jacob Kiraz	Canterbury-Bankstown Bulldogs	
David Klemmer	Wests Tigers	
Edrick Lee	Dolphins	
Anthony Milford	Dolphins	
Jirah Momoisea	Parramatta Eels	
Brayden Musgrove	Cessnock Goannas	
Mark O'Meley (NSW Cup coach)	Released	
Mitchell Pearce	Catalans Dragons	
Willie Peters (assistant coach)	Hull Kingston Rovers	
Dylan Phythian	Lakes United	
Jaron Purcell	Tweed Heads Seagulls	
Chris Randall	Gold Coast Titans	
Kobe Rugless	Blacktown Workers	
Pasami Saulo	Canberra Raiders	
Eric Smith (assistant coach)	Released	
Sauaso Sue	Hull Kingston Rovers	
Ben Talty	North Sydney Bears	
Starford To'a	Wests Tigers	
Tevita Toloi	Redcliffe Dolphins	
Chris Vea'ila	Cronulla-Sutherland Sharks	

=== Promoted juniors ===
Player	Junior side	Source
David Armstrong	Knights NSW Cup	
Tom Cant	Knights NSW Cup	
Riley Jones	Knights NSW Cup	
Dylan Lucas	Knights NSW Cup	
Myles Martin	Knights Jersey Flegg Cup	
Kobe Rugless	Knights NSW Cup	
Tevita Toloi	Knights Jersey Flegg Cup	

=== Re-signings ===
Player/Coach	Re-signed to	Source
David Armstrong	2024	
Thomas Cant	2024	
Phoenix Crossland	2026	
Tyson Frizell	2026	
Brodie Jones	2024	
Riley Jones	2025	
Dylan Lucas	2025	
Greg Marzhew	2026	
Ryan Rivett	2024	
Enari Tuala	2024	

=== Player contract situations ===
2023 (left)	2024	2025	2026	2027
Dane Aukafolau	David Armstrong	Jayden Brailey	Phoenix Crossland	Kalyn Ponga
Fa'amanu Brown	Bradman Best	Adam Elliott	Tyson Frizell	
Adam Clune	Tom Cant	Jackson Hastings	Greg Marzhew	
Lachlan Fitzgibbon	Mat Croker	Jack Hetherington	Daniel Saifiti	
Bailey Hodgson	Dane Gagai	Riley Jones		
Hymel Hunt	Tyson Gamble	Dylan Lucas		
Jack Johns	Brodie Jones	Leo Thompson		
Oryn Keeley	Krystian Mapapalangi			
David Klemmer	Myles Martin			
Kurt Mann	Ryan Rivett			
Lachie Miller	Jacob Saifiti			
Chris Randall	Enari Tuala			
Kobe Rugless				
Simi Sasagi				
Ben Talty				
Tevita Toloi				
Chris Vea'ila				
Dom Young				

== Ladder ==
2023 NRL season
Pos	Team	Pld	W	D	L	B	PF	PA	PD	Pts
1	Penrith Panthers (P)	24	18	0	6	3	645	312	+333	42
2	Brisbane Broncos	24	18	0	6	3	639	425	+214	42
3	Melbourne Storm	24	16	0	8	3	627	459	+168	38
4	New Zealand Warriors	24	16	0	8	3	572	448	+124	38
5	Newcastle Knights	24	14	1	9	3	626	451	+175	35
6	Cronulla-Sutherland Sharks	24	14	0	10	3	619	497	+122	34
7	Sydney Roosters	24	13	0	11	3	472	496	−24	32
8	Canberra Raiders	24	13	0	11	3	486	623	−137	32
9	South Sydney Rabbitohs	24	12	0	12	3	564	505	+59	30
10	Parramatta Eels	24	12	0	12	3	587	574	+13	30
11	North Queensland Cowboys	24	12	0	12	3	546	542	+4	30
12	Manly Warringah Sea Eagles	24	11	1	12	3	545	539	+6	29
13	Dolphins	24	9	0	15	3	520	631	−111	24
14	Gold Coast Titans	24	9	0	15	3	527	653	−126	24
15	Canterbury-Bankstown Bulldogs	24	7	0	17	3	438	769	−331	20
16	St. George Illawarra Dragons	24	5	0	19	3	474	673	−199	16
17	Wests Tigers	24	4	0	20	3	385	675	−290	14

=== Result by round ===
Round	1	2	3	4	5	6	7	8	9	10	11	12	13	14	15	16	17	18	19	20	21	22	23	24	25	26	27
Ground	A	A	H	H	A	H	H	A	A	–	H	A	H	–	A	H	A	A	–	H	H	A	A	H	H	H	A
Result	L	W	L	W	D	W	L	L	L	B	W	L	W	B	L	L	L	W	B	W	W	W	W	W	W	W	W
Position	13	11	14	12	11	8	11	12	14	12	11	12	12	11	13	14	14	14	14	10	10	9	7	7	7	5	5
Points	0	2	2	4	5	7	7	7	7	9	11	11	13	15	15	15	15	17	19	21	23	25	27	29	31	33	35

Source: National Rugby League
A = Away; H = Home; N = Neutral; B = Bye; W = Win; D = Draw; L = Loss

== Milestones ==
- Round 1: Adam Elliott made his debut for the club, after previously playing for the Canberra Raiders.
- Round 1: Jackson Hastings made his debut for the club, after previously playing for the Wests Tigers, and kicked his 1st goal for the club.
- Round 1: Jack Hetherington made his debut for the club, after previously playing for the Canterbury-Bankstown Bulldogs.
- Round 1: Lachie Miller made his debut for the club, after previously playing for the Cronulla-Sutherland Sharks.
- Round 2: Lachlan Fitzgibbon played his 100th career game.
- Round 2: Tyson Gamble made his debut for the club, after previously playing for the Brisbane Broncos.
- Round 3: Tom Cant made his NRL debut for the club.
- Round 3: Dane Gagai played his 150th game for the club and captained his 1st game for the club.
- Round 3: Tyson Gamble scored his 1st try for the club.
- Round 3: Jackson Hastings captained his 1st game for the club.
- Round 3: Dylan Lucas made his NRL debut for the club.
- Round 3: Lachie Miller scored his 1st try for the club and kicked his 1st career goal.
- Round 3: Ryan Rivett made his NRL debut for the club.
- Round 4: Greg Marzhew made his debut for the club, after previously playing for the Gold Coast Titans, and scored his 1st try for the club.
- Round 5: Bradman Best played his 50th game for the club.
- Round 5: Dane Gagai played his 250th career game.
- Round 7: Tyson Gamble kicked his 1st field goal for the club.
- Round 7: Jack Hetherington played his 50th career game.
- Round 8: Kalyn Ponga played his 100th career game.
- Round 12: Tyson Frizell played his 50th game for the club.
- Round 13: Daniel Saifiti played his 150th career game.
- Round 17: Phoenix Crossland played his 50th career game.
- Round 17: Jackson Hastings scored his 1st try for the club.
- Round 18: The Knights broke the record of biggest win in the club's history by defeating the Canterbury-Bankstown Bulldogs 66-0.
- Round 18: Kalyn Ponga equaled the club record of 11 goals kicked in a single match.
- Round 20: Kalyn Ponga played his 100th game for the club.
- Round 22: Brodie Jones played his 50th career game.
- Round 24: Jack Hetherington scored his 1st try for the club.
- Round 24: Leo Thompson scored his 1st career try.
- Round 25: Adam Clune kicked his 1st career field goal.
- Round 26: Fa'amanu Brown made his debut for the club, after previously playing for the Canterbury-Bankstown Bulldogs.
- Round 26: Dylan Lucas scored his 1st career try.
- Round 27: Fa'amanu Brown scored his 1st try for the club.
- Round 27: Tyson Gamble kicked his 1st goal for the club.
- Round 27: Jacob Saifiti captained his 1st game for the club.
- Round 27: Dom Young broke the club record of 21 tries in a season, setting a new record of 23.
- Finals Week 1: Dom Young played his 50th game for the club.

== Jerseys and sponsors ==
In 2023, the Knights' jerseys were made by Classic Sportswear and their major sponsor was nib Health Funds.

2023 Home Jersey	2023 Away Jersey	2023 Anzac Jersey	2023 Indigenous Jersey	2023 NSW Mining Jersey

== Fixtures ==
=== Pre-season trials ===
Date	Opponent	Venue	Score	Tries	Conversions	Attendance
Friday, 10 February	Cronulla-Sutherland Sharks	Industree Group Stadium	16–28	T.Gamble, P.Crossland, L.Pietzner	R.Rivett (2/2)	
Friday, 17 February	Parramatta Eels	Industree Group Stadium	14–36	D.Young, B.Best, G.Marzhew	J.Hastings (1/3)	
Legend: Win Loss Draw

=== Regular season ===
Date	Round	Opponent	Venue	Score	Tries	Goals	Attendance
Friday, 3 March	1	New Zealand Warriors	Sky Stadium	20 - 12	Lachlan Fitzgibbon 1'; Hymel Hunt 45'	Jackson Hastings (2/2)	16,676
Sunday, 12 March	2	Wests Tigers	Leichhardt Oval	12 - 14	Dominic Young 10', 60'; Lachlan Fitzgibbon 15'	Jackson Hastings 12'	13,214
Friday, 17 March	3	Dolphins	McDonald Jones Stadium	20 - 36	Tyson Gamble 18'; Lachlan Miller 35', 45'	Jackson Hastings (3/3); Lachlan Miller (1/1)	20,093
Sunday, 26 March	4	Canberra Raiders	McDonald Jones Stadium	24 - 14	Greg Marzhew 11', 43'; Bradman Best 17'; Dane Gagai 45'; Tyson Frizell 49'	Lachlan Miller (2/6)	15,106
Saturday, 1 April	5	Manly Warringah Sea Eagles	Glen Willow Oval	32 - 32	Greg Marzhew 12'; Jack Johns 17'; Dominic Young 23', 32', 55', 77'	Jackson Hastings (2/3); Lachlan Miller (2/3)	9,024
Sunday, 9 April	6	New Zealand Warriors	McDonald Jones Stadium	34 - 24			18,007
Saturday, 15 April	7	Penrith Panthers	McDonald Jones Stadium	15 - 16			26,084
Saturday, 22 April	8	North Queensland Cowboys	Queensland Country Bank Stadium	18 - 16			17,970
Friday, 28 April	9	Parramatta Eels	CommBank Stadium	43 - 12			15,875
	10	BYE					
Sunday, 14 May	11	Gold Coast Titans	McDonald Jones Stadium	46 - 26			13,064
Saturday, 20 May	12	Cronulla-Sutherland Sharks	Coffs Harbour International Stadium	26 - 6			N/A
Sunday, 28 May	13	Manly Warringah Sea Eagles	McDonald Jones Stadium	28 - 18			20,661
	14	BYE					
Saturday, 10 June	15	Brisbane Broncos	Lang Park	24 -20			35,814
Saturday, 17 June	16	Sydney Roosters	McDonald Jones Stadium	16 - 18			21,966
Saturday, 24 June	17	Penrith Panthers	BlueBet Stadium	20 - 12			18,589
Sunday, 2 July	18	Canterbury-Bankstown Bulldogs	Accor Stadium	0 - 66	Jackson Hastings 12', 51'; Bradman Best 16', 36', 56'; Lachlan Fitzgibbon 24'; Phoenix Crossland 34', 70'; Kurt Mann 42'; Greg Marzhew 49'; Enari Tuala 64'	Kalyn Ponga (11/11)	11,004
	19	BYE					
Friday, 14 July	20	Wests Tigers	McDonald Jones Stadium	34 - 18			18,470
Saturday, 22 July	21	Melbourne Storm	McDonald Jones Stadium	26 - 18			20,392
Saturday, 29 July	22	Canberra Raiders	GIO Stadium	28 - 6			15,487
Saturday, 5 August	23	Dolphins	Optus Stadium	30-28			42,042
Sunday, 13 August	24	Canterbury-Bankstown Bulldogs	McDonald Jones Stadium	42-6			23,464
Sunday, 20 August	25	South Sydney Rabbitohs	McDonald Jones Stadium	29-10			29,018
Sunday, 27 August	26	Cronulla-Sutherland Sharks	McDonald Jones Stadium	32-8			
Saturday, 2 September	27	St. George Illawarra Dragons	Netstrata Jubilee Stadium	32-12			
Legend: Win Loss Draw Bye | * Magic Round

Round 1: 3 March 2023	New Zealand Warriors	20–12	Newcastle Knights	Wellington
20:00 NZDT	Tries: Kosi 25'; Afoa 29'; Nicoll-Klokstad 51'; Egan 73'; Goals: Johnson 2/4 30', 74'	[Report Report]	Tries: Fitzgibbon 1'; Hunt 45'; Goals: Hastings 2/2 3', 46'; Sin bin: Crossland (yellow card) 57' to 67'	Stadium: Sky Stadium; Attendance: 16,676; Referee: Chris Sutton

Round 2: 3 March 2023	Wests Tigers	12–14	Newcastle Knights	Sydney
16:05 AEDT	Tries: Kepaoa 33'; Utoikamanu 79'; Goals: Doueihi 2/2 36', 79'	[Report Report]	Tries: Young 10', 60'; Fitzgibbon 15'; Goals: Hastings 1/3 12'; Sin bin: Young (yellow card) 29' to 39'; Sent off: J. Saifiti (red card) 64'	Stadium: Leichhardt Oval; Attendance: 13,214; Referee: Peter Gough

Round 3: 17 March 2023	Newcastle Knights	20–36	Dolphins	Newcastle
18:00 AEDT	Tries: Gamble 18'; Miller 35', 45'; Goals: Hastings 3/3 19', 37', 46'; Miller 1/1 69 pen'	[Report Report]	Tries: Niu 9', 32', 66'; Nikorima 28'; Tabuai-Fidow 57'; Isaako 75', 79'; Goals: Isaako 4/7 11', 29', 68', 80'; Sin bin: Kaufusi (yellow card) 68' to 78'	Stadium: McDonald Jones Stadium; Attendance: 20,093; Referee: Chris Butler

Round 4: 26 March 2023	Newcastle Knights	24–14	Canberra Raiders	Newcastle
16:05 AEDT	Tries: Marzhew 11', 43'; Best 17'; Gagai 45'; Frizell 49'; Goals: Hastings 0/2; Miller 2/4 44', 47'	[Report Report]	Tries: Young 3'; Wighton 23'; Goals: Harawira-Naera 2/2 5', 25'; Field goals: Frawley 39 (2pt)' Sin bin: Wighton (yellow card) 48' to 58'	Stadium: McDonald Jones Stadium; Attendance: 15,106; Referee: Gerard Sutton

Round 5: 1 April 2023	Manly Warringah Sea Eagles	32–32	Newcastle Knights	Mudgee
15:00 AEDT	Tries: Olakau'atu 3'; Tuipulotu 8'; Parker 27'; Tuilagi 58'; Weekes 66'; Garrick 68'; Goals: Garrick 4/6 4', 28', 60', 67'; Sin bin: Olakau'atu (yellow card) 11' to 21'	[Report Report]	Tries: Marzhew 12'; Johns 17'; Young 23', 32', 55', 77'; Goals: Hastings 2/3 19', 25'; Miller 2/3 33', 57'; Sin bin: Fitzgibbon (yellow card) 20' to 30'	Stadium: Glen Willow Regional Sports Stadium; Attendance: 9,024; Referee: Chris Butler

Round 6: 9 April 2023	Newcastle Knights	34–24	New Zealand Warriors	Newcastle
18:15 AEST	Tries: Young 5'; Marzhew 18', 69'; Frizell 28'; Crossland 36'; Mann 64'; Goals: Miller 5/6 6', 29', 37', 65', 70'	[Report Report]	Tries: Pompey 22', 49'; Kosi 55'; Ford 71'; Goals: Johnson 4/4 23', 50', 56', 72'	Stadium: McDonald Jones Stadium; Attendance: 18,007; Referee: Liam Kennedy

Round 7: 15 April 2023	Newcastle Knights	15–16	Penrith Panthers	Newcastle
17:30 AEST	Tries: Gamble 11'; Frizell 16'; Crossland 27'; Goals: Miller 1/4 29'; Field goals: Gamble 76'	[Report Report]	Tries: To'o 21'; Salmon 57'; Goals: Cleary 3/4 3 pen', 54 pen', 58'; Field goals: Cleary 77', 80'	Stadium: McDonald Jones Stadium; Attendance: 26,084; Referee: Peter Gough

Round 8: 22 April 2023	North Queensland Cowboys	18–16	Newcastle Knights	Townsville
19:35 AEST	Tries: Robson 9'; Feldt 25'; Dearden 64'; Goals: Holmes 3/4 10', 26', 66'; Sin bin: Taulagi (yellow card) 46' to 56'	[Report Report]	Tries: Marzhew 12'; Young 47'; Fitzgibbon 56'; Goals: Miller 2/3 13', 57'	Stadium: Queensland Country Bank Stadium; Attendance: 17,970; Referee: Ben Cummins

Round 9: 28 April 2023	Parramatta Eels	43–12	Newcastle Knights	Sydney
18:00 AEST	Tries: Brown 1'; Moses 9'; Gutherson 22', 34', 46'; Russell 37'; Paulo 69'; Goals: Moses 7/7 3', 10', 24', 35', 38', 47', 71'; Field goals: Moses 79'	[Report Report]	Tries: Croker 6'; Young 62'; Goals: Miller 2/2 7', 64'	Stadium: CommBank Stadium; Attendance: 15,875; Referee: Chris Sutton

Round 10 (Bye for Newcastle Knights)

Round 11: 14 May 2023	Newcastle Knights	46–26	Gold Coast Titans	Newcastle
14:00 AEST	Tries: Young 11', 79'; Frizell 39'; Marzhew 49'; Best 56', 73'; Ponga 60'; Gagai 64'; Goals: Miller 7/9 21 pen', 40', 57', 61', 65', 75', 80'	[Report Report]	Tries: D. Fifita 25', 70'; Sami 29'; Campbell 44'; Khan-Pereira 77'; Goals: Boyd 3/5 26', 30', 46'	Stadium: McDonald Jones Stadium; Attendance: 13,064; Referee: Peter Gough

Round 12: 20 May 2023	Cronulla-Sutherland Sharks	26–6	Newcastle Knights	Coffs Harbour
15:00 AEST	Tries: Kennedy 6'; Mulitalo 26'; Tracey 44'; Hunt 69'; Goals: Hynes 5/5 8', 27', 46', 55 pen', 70'	[Report Report]	Tries: Ponga 19'; Goals: Miller 1/1 20'	Stadium: C.ex Coffs International Stadium; Attendance: 10,156; Referee: Liam Kennedy

== Statistics ==
Name	Appearances	Tries	Goals	Field goals	Points	Captain	Age
Bradman Best	25	13	0	0	52	0	22
Jayden Brailey	5	0	0	0	0	5	27
Fa'amanu Brown	2	1	0	0	4	0	29
Tom Cant	1	0	0	0	0	0	21
Adam Clune	4	1	0	1	5	0	28
Mat Croker	24	3	0	0	12	0	24
Phoenix Crossland	25	6	0	0	24	0	23
Adam Elliott	18	0	0	0	0	0	29
Lachlan Fitzgibbon	21	5	0	0	20	0	29
Tyson Frizell	22	4	0	0	16	17	32
Dane Gagai	22	4	1	0	18	1	32
Tyson Gamble	24	6	1	1	27	0	27
Jackson Hastings	22	4	16	0	48	1	27
Jack Hetherington	26	1	0	0	4	0	27
Hymel Hunt	4	1	0	0	4	0	30
Jack Johns	5	1	0	0	4	0	26
Brodie Jones	11	0	0	0	0	0	24
Riley Jones	1	0	0	0	0	0	21
Oryn Keeley	1	0	0	0	0	0	20
Dylan Lucas	7	2	0	0	8	0	23
Kurt Mann	18	4	0	0	16	0	30
Greg Marzhew	22	22	0	0	88	0	26
Lachie Miller	12	2	26	0	60	0	29
Kalyn Ponga	20	9	45	0	126	20	25
Ryan Rivett	1	0	0	0	0	0	21
Daniel Saifiti	22	2	0	0	8	0	27
Jacob Saifiti	21	1	0	0	4	1	27
Leo Thompson	25	1	0	0	4	0	23
Enari Tuala	6	3	0	0	12	0	25
Dom Young	25	25	0	0	100	0	22
Totals	26	121	89	2	666	–	Average: 26

30 players used.

== NRL Women's team ==
2023 Newcastle Knights season
- NRLW Rank: 1st
- Play-off result: Premiers
- 2023 record: Wins: 8; losses: 1
- Points scored: For: 224; against: 119

Team information
- CEO: Phil Gardner
- Coach: Ronald Griffiths
- Captain: Hannah Southwell
- Stadium: McDonald Jones Stadium
- Avg. attendance: 12,239
- High attendance: 19,519

Top scorers
- Tries: Sheridan Gallagher & Tamika Upton (7)
- Goals: Jesse Southwell (33)
- Points: Jesse Southwell (78)
← 2022	2024 →

The 2023 Newcastle Knights Women's season was the 3rd in the club's history. Coached by Ronald Griffiths and captained by Hannah Southwell, they competed in the NRLW's 2023 NRL Women's Premiership, finishing the regular season in 1st place (out of 10), thus reaching the finals. The Knights made it to the Grand Final, defeating the Gold Coast Titans and claiming the 2023 NRLW premiership. During the absence of Hannah Southwell due to injury, the side was captained by Tamika Upton.

Newcastle Knights women's – 2023 squad
2023 NRLW top 24 squad			Development list	Coaching staff
4 Caitlan Johnston – SR, PR; 26 Yasmin Clydsdale – SR; 27 Olivia Higgins – HK; 28 Shanice Parker – CE; 29 Hannah Southwell (c) – LK; 30 Jesse Southwell – HB (gk); 32 Tamika Upton (vc) – FB; 33 Tayla Predebon – PR; 34 Simone Karpani – PR	37 Tiana Davison – SR; 38 Caitlin Moran – FE; 41 Kayla Romaniuk – LK; 42 Laishon Albert-Jones – LK, SR; 43 Rima Butler – PR; 44 Sheridan Gallagher – WG (gk); 45 Abigail Roache – CE; 46 Jasmin Strange – WG; 47 Nita Maynard – HK	48 Viena Tinao – PR; 49 Georgia Roche – FE; 50 Felila Kia – SR; 51 Jacinta Carter – PR; Jayde Herdegen – FE; Jules Kirkpatrick – LK; Tamerah Leati – WG	Evie Jones – FE; Tazmyne Luschwitz – HK; Tylah Vallance – CE	Head coach: Ronald Griffiths; Legend: (c) Captain(s); (vc) Vice-captain(s); Updated: 11 June 2023; Source(s): Newcastle Knights Profiles, Rugby League Project

=== Player gains & losses ===
Player gains
Player/Coach	Previous club	Length	Source
Laishon Albert-Jones	Mount Pritchard Mounties	2024	
Rima Butler	Parramatta Eels	2024	
Sheridan Gallagher	Mount Pritchard Mounties	2023	
Jayde Herdegen	Wynnum Manly Seagulls	2024	
Felila Kia	Wynnum Manly Seagulls	2024	
Tamerah Leati	Parramatta Eels	2024	
Nita Maynard	Brisbane Broncos	2023	
Abigail Roache	Chiefs Manawa	2024	
Georgia Roche	Leeds Rhinos	2027	
Jasmin Strange	Sydney Roosters	2023	
Viena Tinao	Illawarra Steelers	2023	

Player losses
Player/Coach	Club	Source
Tamsin Barber	Released	
Millie Boyle	Sydney Roosters	
Bree Chester	North Queensland Cowboys	
Sophie Clancy	St. George Illawarra Dragons	
Kirra Dibb	North Queensland Cowboys	
Jessica Gentle	Canberra Raiders	
Bobbi Law	St. George Illawarra Dragons	
Emma Manzelmann	North Queensland Cowboys	
Mia Middleton	North Queensland Cowboys	
Nicole Nathan	Released	
Emmanita Paki	Released	
Kyra Simon	Parramatta Eels	
Autumn-Rain Stephens-Daly	North Queensland Cowboys	
Kiana Takairangi	Cronulla-Sutherland Sharks	
Romy Teitzel	Brisbane Broncos	
Makenzie Weale	North Queensland Cowboys	
Jakiya Whitfeld	Wests Tigers	

Promoted juniors
Player	Junior side	Source
Jacinta Carter	Knights NSWRL Women's Premiership	
Evie Jones	Knights NSWRL Women's Premiership	
Jules Kirkpatrick	Knights NSWRL Women's Premiership	
Tazmyne Luschwitz	Knights NSWRL Women's Premiership	
Tylah Vallance	Knights NSWRL Women's Premiership	

Player re-signings
Player/Coach	Re-signed to	Source
Yasmin Clydsdale	2025	
Tiana Davison	2023	
Olivia Higgins	2023	
Caitlan Johnston	2025	
Simone Karpani	2023	
Caitlin Moran	2023	
Shanice Parker	2024	
Tayla Predebon	2024	
Kayla Romaniuk	2024	
Hannah Southwell	2027	
Jesse Southwell	2027	
Tamika Upton	2027	

==== Player contract situations ====
2023 (left)	2024	2025	2026	2027
Tiana Davison	Laishon Albert-Jones	Yasmin Clydsdale	Olivia Higgins	Jacinta Carter
Felila Kia	Rima Butler	Sheridan Gallagher	Simone Karpani	Georgia Roche
Tazmyne Luschwitz	Jayde Herdegen	Caitlan Johnston		Hannah Southwell
Caitlin Moran	Evie Jones	Viena Tinao		Jesse Southwell
Jasmin Strange	Jules Kirkpatrick			Tamika Upton
Tylah Vallance	Tamerah Leati			
	Nita Maynard			
	Shanice Parker			
	Tayla Predebon			
	Abigail Roache			
	Kayla Romaniuk			

=== Women's milestones ===
- Round 1: Laishon Albert-Jones made her NRLW debut for the club.
- Round 1: Rima Butler made her debut for the club, after previously playing for the Parramatta Eels.
- Round 1: Sheridan Gallagher made her NRLW debut for the club.
- Round 1: Nita Maynard made her debut for the club, after previously playing for the Brisbane Broncos.
- Round 1: Abigail Roache made her NRLW debut for the club and scored her 1st career try.
- Round 1: Kayla Romaniuk scored her 1st career try.
- Round 1: Jasmin Strange made her debut for the club, after previously playing for the Sydney Roosters and scored her 1st try for the club.
- Round 1: Viena Tinao made her NRLW debut for the club.
- Round 2: Rima Butler scored her 1st try for the club.
- Round 2: Sheridan Gallagher scored her 1st career try.
- Round 2: Shanice Parker scored her 1st career try.
- Round 3: Georgia Roche made her debut for the club, after previously playing for the Leeds Rhinos.
- Round 4: Felila Kia made her NRLW debut for the club.
- Round 7: Georgia Roche scored her 1st try for the club.
- Round 8: Jacinta Carter made her NRLW debut for the club.
- Round 9: Sheridan Gallagher kicked her 1st career goal.
- Finals Week 1: Tiana Davison scored her 1st career try.
- Finals Week 1: Hannah Southwell scored her 1st career try.

=== Women's statistics ===
Name	Appearances	Tries	Goals	Field goals	Points	Captain	Age
Laishon Albert-Jones	10	0	0	0	0	0	26
Rima Butler	7	1	0	0	4	0	26
Jacinta Carter	2	0	0	0	0	0	19
Yasmin Clydsdale	11	4	0	0	16	0	29
Tiana Davison	6	1	0	0	4	0	23
Sheridan Gallagher	11	7	4	0	36	0	21
Olivia Higgins	11	4	0	0	16	0	31
Caitlan Johnston	10	1	0	0	4	0	22
Simone Karpani	5	0	0	0	0	0	26
Felila Kia	3	0	0	0	0	0	20
Nita Maynard	11	0	0	0	0	0	31
Caitlin Moran	3	0	0	0	0	0	27
Shanice Parker	11	6	0	0	24	0	25
Tayla Predebon	11	3	0	0	12	0	23
Abigail Roache	11	6	0	0	24	0	23
Georgia Roche	8	1	0	0	4	0	23
Kayla Romaniuk	11	2	0	0	8	0	21
Hannah Southwell	8	1	0	0	4	8	24
Jesse Southwell	11	3	33	0	78	0	18
Jasmin Strange	11	4	0	0	16	0	21
Viena Tinao	4	0	0	0	0	0	21
Tamika Upton	11	7	0	0	28	3	26
Totals	11	51	37	0	278	–	Average: 24

22 players used.

=== Women's draw ===
Round 1: 22 July 2023	Newcastle Knights Women	32 - 16	St. George Illawarra Dragons Women	Newcastle
15:00 AEST	Tries: Predebon 11'; Clydsdale 17'; Romaniuk 27'; Strange 44'; Roache 56'; Southwell 68'; Goals: Southwell 4/6 13', 18', 28', 69'	[ Report]	Tries: Berry 33', 61'; Nathan-Wong 64'; Goals: Bright 1/1 34'; Nathan-Wong 1/2 62'	Stadium: McDonald Jones Stadium; Attendance: 8,109; Referee: Darian Furner

Pre-Season Trial
Date	Round	Opponent	Venue	Score	Tries	Goals	Attendance
Saturday, 8 July	N/A	Brisbane Broncos Women	Maitland No. 1 Sportsground	4 - 18	Tamerah Leati 3'	Sheridan Gallagher (0/1)	N/A

Regular Season
Date	Round	Opponent	Venue	Score	Tries	Goals	Attendance
Saturday, 22 July	1	St. George Illawarra Dragons Women	McDonald Jones Stadium	32 - 16	Tayla Predebon 11'; Yasmin Clydsdale 17'; Kayla Romaniuk 27'; Jasmin Strange 44'; Abigail Roache 56'; Jesse Southwell 68'	Jesse Southwell (4/6)	8,109
Sunday, 30 July	2	North Queensland Cowboys Women	Belmore Sportsground	20 - 31	Sheridan Gallagher 1', 46'; Shanice Parker 8'; Rima Butler 50'	Jesse Southwell (2/6)	2,196
Sunday, 6 August	3	Parramatta Eels Women	CommBank Stadium	4 - 38	Yasmin Clydsdale 6'; Tamika Upton 8'; Olivia Higgins 18'; Tayla Predebon 44'; Abigail Roache 47'; Sheridan Gallagher 57'; Kayla Romaniuk 68'	Jesse Southwell (2/6)	23,596
Sunday, 13 August	4	Gold Coast Titans Women	McDonald Jones Stadium	22 - 10			12,889
Sunday, 20 August	5	Brisbane Broncos Women	McDonald Jones Stadium	22 - 20			17,043
Sunday, 27 August	6	Cronulla-Sutherland Sharks Women	McDonald Jones Stadium	22 - 14			19,519
Saturday, 2 September	7	Canberra Raiders Women	GIO Stadium	12 - 20			1,962
Saturday, 9 September	8	Sydney Roosters Women	McDonald Jones Stadium	20 - 4			3,634
Thursday, 14 September	9	Wests Tigers Women	Campbelltown Sports Stadium	8 - 28			1,733

Finals Series
Date	Round	Opponent	Venue	Score	Tries	Goals	Attendance
Sunday, 24 September	Semi Final	Brisbane Broncos Women	McDonald Jones Stadium	30 - 24	Olivia Higgins 4'; Hannah Southwell 10'; Caitlan Johnston 18'; Tamika Upton 43'; Tiana Davison 65'	Jesse Southwell (5/5)	12,869
Sunday, 1 October	Grand Final	Gold Coast Titans Women	Accor Stadium				

=== Women's ladder ===
2023 NRLW season
Pos	Team	Pld	W	D	L	PF	PA	PD	Pts
1	Wests Tigers	1	1	0	0	36	8	+28	2
2	Sydney Roosters	1	1	0	0	36	18	+18	2
3	Newcastle Knights	1	1	0	0	32	16	+16	2
4	Cronulla-Sutherland Sharks	1	1	0	0	28	14	+14	2
5	Gold Coast Titans	1	1	0	0	16	6	+10	2
6	North Queensland Cowboys	1	0	0	1	6	16	−10	0
7	Canberra Raiders	1	0	0	1	14	28	−14	0
8	St. George Illawarra Dragons	1	0	0	1	16	32	−16	0
9	Brisbane Broncos	1	0	0	1	18	36	−18	0
10	Parramatta Eels	1	0	0	1	8	36	−28	0

== Representative honours ==
The following players appeared in a representative match or were named in a representative squad in 2023.

Australia

- Bradman Best (train-on squad)
- Kalyn Ponga (train-on squad)

Australia (Women's)

- Yasmin Clydsdale
- Caitlan Johnston
- Tamika Upton

England

- Dom Young (squad member)

England (Women's)

- Georgia Roche

Fiji

- Noah Nailagoliva

Indigenous All Stars

- Ronald Griffiths (coach)

Indigenous All Stars (Women's)

- Bree Chester (squad member)
- Kirra Dibb
- Caitlan Johnston (squad member)
- Bobbi Law
- Mia Middleton

Māori All Stars

- Leo Thompson

Māori All Stars (Women's)

- Shanice Parker
- Jasmin Strange

New South Wales

- Tyson Frizell
- Bradman Best
- Jacob Saifiti

New South Wales (Women's)

- Yasmin Clydsdale
- Jesse Southwell

New Zealand

- Fa'amanu Brown
- Leo Thompson

New Zealand (Women's)

- Laishon Albert-Jones
- Tiana Davison
- Shanice Parker
- Abigail Roache

Queensland (Women's)

- Tamika Upton

Samoa

- Greg Marzhew

Samoa (Women's)

- Tamerah Leati

Tonga

- Tyson Frizell

== Individual honours ==
=== Newcastle Knights awards ===
==== NRL ====
- Player of the Year (Danny Buderus Medal): Kalyn Ponga
- Players' Player: Tyson Frizell
- Gladiator of the Year: Phoenix Crossland
- Community Player of the Year: Jacob Saifiti
- Rookie of the Year: Dylan Lucas
- Knight in Shining Armour: Leo Thompson
- NSW Cup Player of the Year: Adam Clune
- NSW Cup Players' Player: Jack Johns
- Jersey Flegg Player of the Year: Jack Cullen
- Jersey Flegg Players' Player: Brock Greacen

==== NRLW ====
- Player of the Year: Tamika Upton
- Players' Player: Shanice Parker & Tamika Upton
- Coaches Award: Yasmin Clydsdale
- Rookie of the Year: Sheridan Gallagher
- Gladiator of the Year: Yasmin Clydsdale
- Community Player of the Year: Kayla Romaniuk
- Thrive Award: Tiana Davison

=== NRL awards ===
- Player of the Year (Dally M Medal): Kalyn Ponga
- Fullback of the Year: Kalyn Ponga

=== NRLW awards ===
- Player of the Year (Dally M Medal): Tamika Upton
- Grand Final Player of the Match (Karyn Murphy Medal): Tamika Upton
- Fullback of the Year: Tamika Upton
- Second-rower of the Year: Yasmin Clydsdale
