= Riley (given name) =

- Pronunciation: /ˈraɪli/ RY-lee
- Gender: Unisex
- Language: English

Origin
- Languages: Old English; Irish Gaelic
- Origin: Riley (surname)
- Meaning: 'rye' + 'wood, clearing'
- Region of origin: England and Ireland

Other names
- Variant forms: Reilly, Rileigh, Rylee, Ryleigh, Rylie etc.

Riley is a transferred use of an English surname derived from Old English ryge 'rye' + lēah 'wood, clearing'.

It is also derived from the Irish surname O'Reilly, which originated from the Irish name Raghallach, of unknown meaning.

== Regional variations ==
=== Europe ===
In the United Kingdom, it is still primarily a boy's name, and was the 40th most popular name for boys in 2016.

=== United States ===
Until the 1990s and early 2000s, Riley was primarily a boy's name in the United States. However, it has become a popular name for girls in the United States and remains in wide use there for girls, with many variant spellings also in use, including Reiley, Reilly, Reily, Rhilee, Rhiley, Rhylee, Rhylei, Rhyleigh, Rhyley, Rhyli, Rhylie, Rielee, Rilee, Rileigh, Rilie, Ryelee, Rylea, Rylee, Rylei, Ryleigh, Ryley, Ryli, Rylie, Ryliee, and Ryliegh. It also remains a well-used name there for boys, also with variant spellings.

== People with the name ==
=== A ===
- Riley Adams (born 1996), American baseball player
- Riley Amos (born 2002), American cyclist
- Riley Armstrong (ice hockey) (born 1984), Canadian ice hockey player and coach
- Riley Armstrong (musician) (born 1976), Canadian singer-songwriter
- Riley Ayre (born 1996), Australian cricketer

=== B ===
- Riley Balsom (born 1996), Canadian politician
- Riley Barber (born 1994), American ice hockey player
- Riley Bartholomew (1807–1894), American politician and pioneer
- Riley Baugus, American guitarist
- Riley P. Bechtel (born 1952), American businessman
- Riley A. Bender (1890–1973), American businessman and politician
- Riley Bidois (born 2002), New Zealand footballer
- Riley Biggs (1900–1971), American football player
- Riley Black, American paleontologist
- Riley Bonner (born 1997), Australian rules footballer
- Riley Breckenridge (born 1975), American musician
- Riley Brengman (born 2002), American ice hockey player
- Riley Brett (1895–1982), American race car driver
- Riley Brockington (born 1975), Canadian politician
- Riley Brown (born 1984), Australian rugby union footballer
- Riley Bullough (born 1993), American football player
- Riley Burruss (born 2002), American television personality

=== C ===
- Riley Chamberlain (born 2004), American runner
- Riley Chamberlin (1852–1917), American actor
- Riley Clemmons (born 1999), American musician
- Riley Cooper (born 1987), American football player
- Riley Cote (born 1982), Canadian ice hockey player

=== D ===
- Riley Damiani (born 2000), Canadian ice hockey player
- Riley Darnell (1940–2020), American lawyer and politician
- Riley Day (born 2000), Australian sprinter
- Riley Dean (born 2001), Irish rugby union footballer
- Riley Dickinson (born 2002), American racing driver
- Riley Dixon (born 1993), American football player
- Riley Dodge (born 1988), American football player
- Riley Dolezal (born 1985), American javelin thrower
- Riley Duran (born 2002), American ice hockey player

=== E ===
- Riley Etheridge Jr., American singer-songwriter

=== F ===
- Riley Ferguson (born 1995), American football player
- Riley Fitzsimmons (born 1996), Australian canoeist

=== G ===
- Riley Gaines (born 2000), American swimmer
- Riley Gardner (1921–2007), American psychologist
- Riley Gentry (born 1999), American stock car racing driver
- Riley Gibbs (born 1996), American sailor
- Riley Gill (born 1985), American ice hockey player
- Riley Grant (born 1995), American soccer player
- Riley Green (singer) (born 1988), American singer-songwriter
- Riley Greene (born 2000), American baseball player
- Riley Griffiths (born 1997), American football player
- Riley Gunnels (1937–2024), American football player

=== H ===
- Riley Harbottle (born 2000), English footballer
- Riley Hardeman (born 2005), Australian rules footballer
- Riley Hatch (1862–1925), American singer
- Riley Hawk (born 1992), American skateboarder
- Riley Hekure (born 1994), Papua New Guinean cricketer
- Riley Herbst (born 1999), American stock car racing driver
- Riley Hern (1878–1929), Canadian ice hockey player
- Riley Higgins (born 2002), New Zealand rugby union footballer
- Riley Hill (actor) (1914–1993), American actor
- Riley Hohepa (born 1995), New Zealand rugby union footballer
- Riley Holzapfel (born 1988), Canadian ice hockey player
- Riley Hoover (born 1998), Guamanian-American footballer
- Riley D. Housewright (1913–2003), American microbiologist

=== I ===
- Riley Ingram (born 1941), American politician

=== J ===
- Riley Jackson (born 2005), American soccer player
- Riley Janes (born 1980), Canadian swimmer
- Riley Jones (disambiguation), multiple people

=== K ===
- Riley Keaton (born 1997), American politician
- Riley Keough (born 1989), American actress
- Riley Knight (born 1995), Australian rules footballer
- Riley B. King, American blues artist

=== L ===
- Riley Larkin, American football coach
- Riley Lee (born 1951), American-Australian shakuhachi player
- Riley Leonard (born 2002), American football player
- Riley Loos (born 2000), American gymnast
- Riley Lumb (born 2004), English rugby league footballer

=== M ===
- Riley MacLeod (born 2002), Canadian football player
- Riley Mahlman (born 2002), American football player
- Riley Mants (born 1978), Canadian swimmer
- Riley Martin (1946–2015), American author
- Riley Martin (baseball) (born 1998), American baseball player
- Riley Masters (born 1990), American runner
- Riley Matheson (1914–1987), American football player
- Riley Mattson (born 1938), American football player
- Riley McCarron (born 1993), American football player
- Riley McCormick (born 1991), Canadian diver
- Riley McCusker (born 2001), American artistic gymnast
- Riley McGree (born 1998), Australian footballer
- Riley Melanson (born 1999), Canadian kayaker
- Riley Meredith (born 1996), Australian cricketer
- Riley Mesepitu, Solomon Islander politician
- Riley Carter Millington (born 1993/1994), English actor
- Riley Milne (born 1990), Australian rules footballer
- Riley Minix (born 2000), American basketball player
- Riley Montana (born 1990), American fashion model
- Riley Moore (born 1980/1981), American politician
- Riley Morris (1935–2017), American football player
- Riley Moss (born 2000), American football player

=== N ===
- Riley Nash (born 1989), Canadian ice hockey player
- Riley Nelson (born 1977), Canadian ice hockey player
- Riley Newman (born 1993), American professional pickleball player
- Riley Dobi Noel (1972–2003), American murderer
- Riley Nottingham (born 1991), Australian actor
- Riley Nowakowski (born 2002), American football player

=== O ===
- Riley O'Brien (born 1995), American baseball player
- Riley O'Neill (born 1985), Canadian soccer player
- Riley Odoms (born 1950), American football player
- Riley Osborne (born 1998), British professional wrestler

=== P ===
- Riley Parker (disambiguation), multiple people
- Riley Parsons (born 2000), English snooker player
- Riley Patterson (born 1998), American football player
- Riley Pettijohn (born 2007), American football player
- Riley J. Petree (1853–1928), American politician
- Riley Pickett (born 1997), Canadian football player
- Riley Pickrell (born 2000), Canadian cyclist
- Riley Pint (born 1997), American baseball player
- Riley L. Pitts (1937–1967), American soldier
- Riley Price (born 2001), Australian rugby league footballer
- Riley Puckett (1894–1946), American musician

=== Q ===
- Riley Quick (born 2004), American baseball player

=== R ===
- Riley Reddish (1933–2008), American politician
- Riley Redgate, American author
- Riley Reid (born 1991), American pornographic actress
- Riley Reiff (born 1988), American football player
- Riley Ridley (born 1996), American football player
- Riley Edward Robinson (1847–1921), English minister
- Riley Rossmo, Canadian comic book artist

=== S ===
- Riley Salmon (born 1976), American volleyball player
- Riley Sawchuk (born 1999), Canadian ice hockey player
- Riley Ann Sawyers (2005–2007), American murder victim
- Riley Schillaci (born 1982), American performance artist
- Riley Senft (born 1979), Canadian humanitarian
- Riley Sheahan (born 1991), Canadian ice hockey player
- Riley Sheehan (born 2000), American cyclist
- Riley Shepard (1918–2009), American musician
- Riley Skinner (born 1986), American football player
- Riley Smith (born 1978), American actor
- Riley Smith (American football) (1911–1999), American football player
- Riley Stearns (born 1986), American filmmaker
- Riley Steele (born 1987), American pornographic actress
- Riley Stewart (1919–2000), American baseball player
- Riley Stillman (born 1998), Canadian ice hockey player
- Riley E. Stratton (1823–1866), American attorney
- Riley Swanson (born 1984), American attorney

=== T ===
- Riley Thilthorpe (born 2002), Australian rules footballer
- Riley Thomson (1912–1960), American animator
- Riley Tiernan (born 2002), American soccer player
- Riley Tufte (born 1998), American ice hockey player

=== U ===
- Riley Uggla (born 1995), British-Canadian designer

=== V ===
- Riley Voelkel (born 1990), American-Canadian actress

=== W ===
- Riley Wallace (born 1941), American basketball coach
- Riley "Special" Wallace (born 1983), Canadian musician
- Riley Walz (born 2002), American software engineer
- Riley Wang (born 1996), Canadian-Taiwanese actor
- Riley Ware (born 1962), American football player
- Riley Warland (born 2002), Australian footballer
- Riley Watson (1859–1915), English doctor
- Riley Weselowski (born 1985), Canadian ice hockey player
- Riley Weston (born 1966), American actress
- Riley Williams (born 1998), American political figure
- Riley J. Wilson (1871–1946), American attorney and legislator
- Riley Woodcock (born 1995), Australian footballer

=== Y ===
- Riley S. Young (1860–1952), American politician

== Fictional characters ==
Fictional characters with the given name include:

- Riley Abel, a character in the video game The Last of Us: Left Behind
- Riley Andersen, a character in the Inside Out franchise
- Riley Biers, a character in the novel series The Twilight Saga
- Riley Blue, a character in the Netflix series Sense8
- Riley Daring, a character in The Replacements
- Riley Dawson, character in the television series Terminator: The Sarah Connor Chronicles
- Riley Finn, character in the television series Buffy the Vampire Slayer
- Riley Freeman, character in the animated television series The Boondocks
- Riley Griffin, a character in Power Rangers Dino Charge.
- Riley Matthews, a character in the Disney Channel spinoff series Girl Meets World
- Riley Parker, a character in Neighbours
- Riley Roberts, a character from the Disney Channel show The Torkelsons
- Riley Valdor, a character in the game Timecrest

== See also ==
- Riley (surname), a page for people with the surname "Riley"
- Raili, a similarly pronounced Estonian and Finnish name
