= Railio =

Railio is a Finnish surname. Notable people with the surname include:

- Antti Railio (born 1984), Finnish rock and pop rock singer
- Eino Railio (1886–1970), Finnish gymnast

== See also ==
- Raili
