= Schillaci =

Schillaci may refer to:

== People ==
- Giovanni Schillaci (born 1967), Italian wrestler
- Jenna Schillaci (born 1984), English football defender
- Jon Schillaci (born 1971), American sex offender
- Orazio Schillaci (born 1966), Italian politician
- Riley Schillaci (born 1982), American sword swallower
- Salvatore Schillaci (1964–2024), Italian football striker

== Horse racing ==
- Schillaci (horse) (1988–2001), Australian Thoroughbred racehorse
- Schillaci Stakes, Australian thoroughbred horse race
