= 2024 NRL Women's season squads =

Australian rugby league players

The 2024 NRL Women's Premiership comprised 10 competing teams. Starting squad size was 24 players on contract with a further 4 players on development contracts. Squad size could grow above these initial limits subject to the approval of the administrative body, the National Rugby League, to cover contracted players who sustained season-ending injuries.

Approval for replacements into the squad could be sought for injured players who were on multi-year contracts, including for injuries carried over from the 2023 NRLW season or 2023 Pacific Championships. Similarly, a club could seek approval to replace a player injured in pre-season training or a trial match.

The 10 clubs in total used 239 players. Each club used between 22 and 26 players. The number of players making their NRLW debut in the 2024 season was 49. By club this ranged from two (North Queensland Cowboys) to nine (Wests Tigers) debutants.

During the season, 358 tries were scored by 139 individual players. So, 58.16% of players scored at least one try. A tally of 232 goals were kicked by 17 players, with five of the ten teams having a single successful goalkicker. Two field-goals were kicked during the season, the first by Kirra Dibb for North Queensland Cowboys in their Round 4, 11–10 win over the Gold Coast Titans, and the second by Tarryn Aiken for Sydney Roosters in their semi-final, 25–16 win over Newcastle Knights.

Statistics for the past seasons drawn from the Rugby League Project.

== Key ==
- Age is at 22 September 2024, the last day of the regular season (Round 9).
- Position(s) are those played during the season. Players who made appearances only off the interchange bench are listed with the position or positions played when they took the field.
- In the NRLW Career columns:
  - S is the number of NRLW seasons played.
  - M is the number of NRLW matches played at the end of the 2024 season.
- in the 2024 Reps columns:
  - The Int'l column includes matches in the Pacific Championships and other internationals.
    - The number to the right of the flag indicates the number of matches played.
    - A zero (0) indicates the player was included in an international squad but did not play in a match during 2024.
  - The Origin series consisted on 3 matches played on May 16, June 6 and 27, 2024.
    - New South Wales
    - Queensland
    - The number to the right of the icon indicates the number of matches played. A zero (0) indicates the player was included in an Origin squad but did not play in the 2024 series.
  - Other includes the All Stars match, the Prime Minister's XIII match and the Under 19 State of Origin match
    - 1 indicates an appearance for the Indigenous All Stars.
    - 1 indicates an appearance for the Māori All Stars.
    - 1 indicates an appearance for the Australian Prime Minister's XIII Women's team.
    - 1 indicates an appearance for the Papua New Guinea Prime Minister's XIII Women's team.
    - U indicates an appearance for the New South Wales Under 19 State of Origin team.
    - U indicates an appearance for the Queensland Under 19 State of Origin team.

== Brisbane Broncos ==
The Brisbane Broncos were coached by Scott Prince.

Jersey numbers in the table reflect the Broncos' Semi-Final Team List.

J#	Player	Age	Position(s)	NRLW Career			Past Seasons 2018-23	2024 NRLW					2024 Reps
J#	Player	Age	Position(s)	Debut	S	M	Past Seasons 2018-23	M	T	G	F	Pts	Int'l	Origin	Other
1	Hayley Maddick	32	Fullback	2021	4	29	19	10	3	0	0	12	—	—	—
2	Julia Robinson	26	Wing	2018	7	34	24	10	9	0	0	36	3	3	—
3	Mele Hufanga	29	Centre	2023	2	20	10	10	7	0	0	28	3	—	—
4	Shenae Ciesiolka	27	Centre	2020	5	32	24	8	5	0	0	20	—	3	—
5	Lauren Dam	27	Wing, Centre	2021	3	19	2 10	7	2	0	0	8	—	—	—
6	Gayle Broughton	28	Five-eighth	2022	3	23	7 8	8	2	0	0	8	3	—	—
7	Ali Brigginshaw	34	Halfback	2018	7	43	33	10	1	0	0	4	2	3	—
8	Brianna Clark	29	Prop	2020	5	26	2 4 12	8	1	2	0	8	3	—	—
9	Jada Ferguson	22	Hooker	2021	4	26	16	10	3	0	0	12	—	—	—
10	Annetta Nu'uausala	29	Prop	2018	6	24	4 5 9	6	0	0	0	0	3	—	—
11	Mariah Denman	27	Second-row	2018	4	23	17	6	0	6	0	12	—	—	—
19	Tazmin Rapana	29	Second-row	2018	6	32	4 14 3 4	7	1	0	0	4	—	—	—
13	Keilee Joseph	22	Lock, Prop	2021	4	32	22	10	0	0	0	0	3	2	1
14	Destiny Brill	21	Hooker	2021	4	30	6 6 9	9	2	0	0	8	2	2	1
15	Chelsea Lenarduzzi	28	Prop	2018	7	42	32	10	4	0	0	16	—	1	—
16	Lavinia Gould	41	Hooker, Lock	2018	7	30	21	9	1	0	0	4	—	—	—
17	Tafito Lafaele	23	Prop, Second-row	2021	2	13	5	8	1	0	0	4	—	—	—
18	Skyla Adams	19	Five-eighth	2024	1	2	—	2	0	0	0	0	—	0	U
IJ	Romy Teitzel	25	Second-row	2020	5	32	11 12	9	4	24	0	64	—	3	—
20	Jasmine Fogavini	27	Lock	2022	3	14	10	4	0	0	0	0	1	—	—
21	Ashleigh Werner	31	Wing	2023	1	7	7	0	0	0	0	0	—	—	—
22	Bree Spreadborough	25	Wing	2024	1	2	—	2	0	0	0	0	—	—	—
–	Bridget Hoy	25	Fullback	2024	1	1	—	1	0	0	0	0	—	—	—
–	Hannah Larsson	21	Second-row	2022	1	3	3	0	0	0	0	0	—	—	—
IJ	Stacey Waaka	28	Wing	2024	1	6	—	6	6	0	0	24	—	—	—
DV	Shaylee Joseph	18	Second-row	—	0	0	—	0	0	0	0	0	—	—	U
DV	Reegan Hicks	18	Second-row	—	0	0	—	0	0	0	0	0	—	—	U
DV	Montaya Hudson	18	Fullback	—	0	0	—	0	0	0	0	0	—	—	U
DV	Shalom Sauaso	17	Centre	—	0	0	—	0	0	0	0	0	—	—	—

- The following players were signed on a Development contract for 2024:
  - Montaya Hudson (Norths Devils, BMD 10 games and U19 game in 2024)
  - Reegan Hicks (Norths Devils, BMD 5 games and Dolphins U19 4 games in 2024)
  - Shaylee Joseph (Brisbane Tigers, BMD 7 games and 5 U19 games in 2024)
  - Shalom Sauaso (Rugby Union and Queensland City U17 Rugby League in 2024)

The Brisbane Broncos announced player signings in several instalments from December 2023 to 7 June 2024.

== Canberra Raiders ==
The Canberra Raiders are coached by Darrin Borthwick.

Jersey numbers in the table reflect the Raiders' Round 9 Team List.

J#	Player	Age	Position(s)	NRLW Career			Past Seasons 2018-23	2024 NRLW					2024 Reps
J#	Player	Age	Position(s)	Debut	S	M	Past Seasons 2018-23	M	T	G	F	Pts	Int'l	Origin	Other
1	Apii Nicholls	31	Fullback	2018	5	28	6 5 8	9	1	0	0	4	2	—	—
2	Madison Bartlett	29	Wing	2019	6	34	5 6 5 9	9	8	0	0	32	—	—	—
3	Cheyelle Robins-Reti	27	Centre	2023	2	18	9	9	0	0	0	0	0	—	—
18	Relna Wuruki-Hosea	18	Centre	2024	1	3	—	3	0	0	0	0	—	—	U
5	Shakiah Tungai	27	Wing	2018	6	26	8 2 9	7	4	2	0	20	—	—	—
6	Zahara Temara	27	Five-eighth	2018	7	42	24 9	9	2	25	0	58	—	1	1
7	Ashleigh Quinlan	29	Halfback	2022	3	23	6 9	8	2	0	0	8	3	—	1
8	Grace Kemp	23	Prop	2023	2	18	9	9	2	0	0	8	—	3	1 1
9	Chanté Temara	23	Hooker, Lock	2020	4	21	2 1 9	9	0	0	0	0	—	—	1 1
10	Sophie Holyman	26	Prop	2022	3	23	5 9	9	1	0	0	4	—	2	1
11	Monalisa Soliola	20	Second-row	2022	3	20	5 8	7	1	0	0	4	3	—	1
12	Hollie-Mae Dodd	21	Second-row	2023	2	15	7	8	1	0	0	4	1	—	—
13	Simaima Taufa	30	Lock	2018	7	39	10 12 9	8	4	0	0	16	3	—	—
14	Emma Barnes	20	Hooker	2023	2	14	5	9	1	0	0	4	—	—	—
15	Jaida Faleono	18	Prop	2024	1	3	—	3	0	0	0	0	—	—	—
16	Amelia Pasikala	20	Prop	2023	2	11	7	4	1	0	0	4	—	—	—
17	Felice Quinlan	26	Second-row	2024	1	5	—	5	1	0	0	4	—	—	—
19	Tatiana Finau	20	Second-row	2024	1	1	—	1	0	0	0	0	0	—	—
4	Mackenzie Wiki	22	Centre	2023	2	14	7	7	4	0	0	16	1	—	—
20	Georgia Willey	19	Wing	2024	1	1	—	1	0	0	0	0	—	—	—
21	Alanna Dummett	20	Wing	2023	2	4	2	2	1	0	0	4	—	—	—
22	Tommaya Kelly-Sines	29	Prop	2021	3	16	4 7	5	0	0	0	0	—	—	1
DV	Ua Ravu	27	Lock	2023	1	2	2	0	0	0	0	0	3	—	1
S	Kerehitina Matua	25	Second-row	2023	2	16	9	7	1	0	0	4	1	—	1
C	Sereana Naitokatoka	23	Halfback	2021	3	19	4 9	6	0	0	0	0	2	—	—
DV	Ella Ryan	22	Centre	2023	1	1	1	0	0	0	0	0	—	—	—
DV	Elise Smith	31	Second-row	2023	1	3	3	0	0	0	0	0	—	—	—
DV	Claudia Finau	18	Prop	—	0	0	—	0	0	0	0	0	0	—	—

Notes:

- The following players have been signed on a Development contract for 2024:
  - Claudia Finau
  - Ua Ravu
  - Ella Ryan
  - Elise Smith
- Felice Quinlan returned from an ankle injury that prevented her playing in the 2023 season.

The Canberra Raiders announced player signings in several instalments from December 2023 to 22 May 2024.

== Cronulla-Sutherland Sharks ==
The Cronulla-Sutherland Sharks were coached by Tony Herman.

Jersey numbers in the table reflect the Sharks' Grand Final Team List.

J#	Player	Age	Position(s)	NRLW Career			Past Seasons 2018-23	2024 NRLW					2024 Reps
J#	Player	Age	Position(s)	Debut	S	M	Past Seasons 2018-23	M	T	G	F	Pts	Int'l	Origin	Other
1	Emma Tonegato	29	Fullback, Five-eighth	2021	4	31	13 9	9	0	0	0	0	—	3	—
2	Cassie Staples	31	Wing, Fullback	2022	3	17	1 5	11	4	0	0	16	2	—	—
3	Tiana Penitani	28	Centre	2019	6	36	6 10 9	11	9	0	0	36	3	3	—
4	Annessa Biddle	21	Centre	2023	2	19	8	11	4	0	0	16	2	—	1
5	Georgia Ravics	29	Wing	2023	2	16	5	11	5	0	0	20	—	—	—
6	Georgia Hannaway	23	Five-eighth	2024	1	7	—	7	1	0	0	4	—	—	—
7	Tayla Preston	24	Halfback	2022	3	26	6 9	11	0	22	0	44	—	—	—
8	Ellie Johnston	23	Prop	2020	5	35	3 12 9	11	4	0	0	16	—	0	—
9	Quincy Dodd	24	Hooker	2019	6	38	5 13 9	11	3	0	0	12	1	—	1
17	Tegan Dymock	22	Prop	2021	4	25	6 8	11	1	0	0	4	1	—	—
11	Talei Holmes	24	Second-row	2020	5	29	10 9	10	0	0	0	0	2	—	—
12	Rhiannon Byers	25	Second-row	2023	2	11	1	10	1	0	0	4	—	—	—
13	Brooke Anderson	28	Lock	2022	3	25	5 9	11	0	0	0	0	3	—	1
14	Filomina Hanisi	23	Prop	2020	5	24	4 12 4	4	0	0	0	0	1	—	—
15	Manilita Takapautolo	18	Prop	2024	1	7	—	7	0	0	0	0	1	—	U
16	Vanessa Foliaki	31	Second-row	2018	6	38	11 7 9	11	0	0	0	0	1	—	—
10	Holli Wheeler	34	Prop	2018	6	37	20 7	10	1	0	0	4	—	—	—
19	Nakia Davis-Welsh	28	Wing	2023	2	6	2	4	2	0	0	8	—	—	—
20	Chloe Saunders	–	Prop, Lock	2023	2	18	9	9	0	0	0	0	—	—	—
21	Dominique du Toit	27	Wing	2024	1	1	—	1	0	0	0	0	—	—	—
22	Sharni Smale	36	Lock	2024	1	4	—	4	0	0	0	0	—	—	—
23	Leki Leilua	18	Prop	—	0	0	—	0	0	0	0	0	—	—	—
–	Pia Tapsell	26	Prop, Lock	—	0	0	—	0	0	0	0	0	—	—	—
–	Andie Robinson	22	Wing	2022	2	11	5 6	0	0	0	0	0	—	—	—
DV	Jaydika Tafua	18	Second-row	—	0	0	—	0	0	0	0	0	—	—	—
IS	Jada Taylor	21	Fullback	2022	3	9	1 6	2	1	0	0	4	—	—	—
IS	Grace-Lee Weekes	20	Wing	—	0	0	—	0	0	0	0	0	—	—	—
DV	Joy Levy	19	Centre	—	0	0	—	0	0	0	0	0	—	—	—
DV	Stephanie Faulkner	19	Lock	—	0	0	—	0	0	0	0	0	—	—	—
DV	Tia-Jordyn Vasilovski	19	Wing, Fullback	—	0	0	—	0	0	0	0	0	—	—	U

Notes:

- The following players have been signed on a Development contract for 2024:
  - Joy Levy (Cronulla Sharks U19, 10 games in 2024)
  - Stephanie Faulkner (Cronulla Sharks U19, 8 games in 2024)
  - Jaydika Tafua (Cronulla Sharks U19, 10 games in 2024)
  - Tia-Jordyn Vasilovski (Cronulla Sharks U19, 9 games in 2024)
- Following Round 2, the Cronulla Sharks announced that Jada Taylor (ACL) and Grace-Lee Weekes (fractured fibula on top of syndesmosis) had sustained injuries that were season-ending.
- On 13 August 2024, the Cronulla Sharks announced that Australian Rugby Sevens player, Sharni Smale, had signed with the club for the remainder on the 2024 season. Smale has recently returned from the Paris Olympics.
- On 20 August 2024, the Cronulla Sharks announced that Australian Rugby Sevens player, Dominique du Toit, had signed with the club for the remainder on the 2024 season. Du Toit has recently returned from the Paris Olympics.

The Cronulla Sutherland Sharks announced player signings in several instalments from January 2024 to 8 July 2024.

== Gold Coast Titans ==
The Gold Coast Titans were coached by Karyn Murphy.

Jersey numbers in the table reflect the Titans' Round 9 Team List.

J#	Player	Age	Position(s)	NRLW Career			Past Seasons 2018-23	2024 NRLW					2024 Reps
J#	Player	Age	Position(s)	Debut	S	M	Past Seasons 2018-23	M	T	G	F	Pts	Int'l	Origin	Other
21	Evania Pelite	29	Fullback	2020	5	33	3 21	9	4	0	0	16	2	3	—
2	Georgia Grey	19	Wing	2024	1	8	—	8	2	0	0	8	—	—	—
3	Jaime Chapman	22	Centre	2020	5	31	9 5 9	8	3	0	0	12	—	3	1 1
4	Sarina Masaga	–	Centre	2024	1	3	—	3	1	0	0	4	3	—	—
1	Karina Brown	35	Wing	2018	7	32	7 3 20	2	0	0	0	0	—	—	—
6	Taliah Fuimaono	25	Five-eighth, Centre	2021	4	21	13 1	7	1	0	0	4	—	3	1
7	Lailani Montgomery	18	Five-eighth, Halfback	2024	1	5	—	5	0	0	0	0	—	—	—
16	Sienna Lofipo	19	Five-eighth, Prop	2023	2	14	10	4	1	0	0	4	3	1	—
9	Brittany Breayley-Nati	33	Hooker	2018	6	39	4 4 22	9	0	0	0	0	—	—	—
10	Jessika Elliston	26	Prop, Second-row	2019	6	36	5 22	9	0	0	0	0	0	3	—
11	Zara Canfield	23	Second-row	2021	4	24	18	6	0	1	0	2	—	—	—
12	Shaylee Bent	24	Second-row	2019	6	39	19 11	9	0	0	0	0	—	—	1 1
13	Georgia Hale	29	Lock	2018	7	39	9 21	9	0	0	0	0	3	—	—
14	Lily-Rose Kolc	19	Hooker	2024	1	7	—	7	0	0	0	0	—	—	—
15	Laikha Clarke	22	Prop	2021	4	19	10	9	2	0	0	8	2	—	—
8	Shannon Mato	26	Prop	2020	5	31	4 18	9	0	0	0	0	3	3	1
17	Dannii Perese	20	Prop	2023	2	12	7	5	0	0	0	0	1	—	—
19	Hailee-Jay Ormond-Maunsell	20	Centre	2021	4	11	8	3	1	0	0	4	—	—	—
20	Georgia Sim	26	Wing	2024	1	1	—	1	0	0	0	0	—	—	—
22	Rilee Jorgensen	18	Second-row	2023	2	12	8	4	0	0	0	0	—	—	—
23	Emily Bass	25	Wing	2021	4	18	7 4	7	6	0	0	24	—	1	—
–	Malaela Sua	18	Prop	—	0	0	—	0	0	0	0	0	—	—	U
S	Ngatokotoru Arakua	27	Prop	2018	4	13	4 4 2	3	1	0	0	4	0	—	—
IS	Chantay Kiria-Ratu	19	Five-eighth	2023	1	11	11	0	0	0	0	0	—	—	—
IS	Destiny Mino-Sinapati	19	Centre	2023	1	10	10	0	0	0	0	0	—	—	—
IS	Ivana Lolesio	20	Centre	—	0	0	—	0	0	0	0	0	—	—	—
IS	Niall Williams-Guthrie	36	Centre	2023	2	17	11	6	1	0	0	4	—	—	—
IS	Lauren Brown	29	Halfback	2020	5	33	10 16	7	3	11	0	34	0	3	1
IS	Matekino Gray	19	Prop	2024	1	4	—	4	0	0	0	0	—	—	U
DV	Tiresa Elika	18	Lock	—	0	0	—	0	0	0	0	0	—	—	—
DV	Estanoa Faitala-Mariner	–	Wing	—	0	0	—	0	0	0	0	0	—	—	—

Notes:

- The following players were signed on a Development contract for 2024:
  - Tiresa Elika (Brisbane Tigers, U19 7 games and BMD 1 game in 2024)
  - Estanoa Faitala-Mariner (Returning from injury)
  - Lailani Montgomery (Indigenous Academy Sydney Roosters, U19 7 games in 2024)
  - Sarina Masaga (Burleigh Bears, U19 5 games and BMD 5 games in 2024)
- Destiny Mino-Sinapati and Ivana Lolesio both suffered knee injuries in BMD Premiership matches during April 2024. Chantay Kiria-Ratu also suffered a knee injury in the BMD Premiership in early May 2024 The lengthy recovery period requires them to miss the 2024 NRLW season.
- Georgia Grey was initially signed to a Development contract for 2024 but was subsequently elevated to a full contract, to fill a gap created by the three season-ending injuries to Kiria-Ratu, Lolesio, and Mino-Sinapati. Lailani Montgomery was elevated from the Titans Academy into a Development contract.
- The Gold Coast Titans entered into a feeder-club agreement with the Manly Warringah Sea Eagles. Georgia Grey, Laikha Clarke, and Ngatokotoru Arakua played for Manly in their Round 1 match of the 2024 Harvey Norman NSW Women's Premiership on 14 July 2024.

The Gold Coast Titans announced player signings in several instalments from January 2024.

== Newcastle Knights ==
The Newcastle Knights were coached by Ben Jeffries.

Jersey numbers in the table reflect the Knights' Semi-Final Team List.

J#	Player	Age	Position(s)	NRLW Career			Past Seasons 2018-23	2024 NRLW					2024 Reps
J#	Player	Age	Position(s)	Debut	S	M	Past Seasons 2018-23	M	T	G	F	Pts	Int'l	Origin	Other
1	Tamika Upton	27	Fullback	2019	6	37	11 16	10	7	0	0	28	3	3	1
2	Sheridan Gallagher	22	Wing	2023	2	19	11	8	9	3	0	42	—	—	—
3	Shanice Parker	26	Centre	2019	5	33	5 18	10	2	0	0	8	3	—	1
4	Abigail Roache	28	Centre	2023	2	20	11	9	3	0	0	12	3	—	—
5	Tenika Willison	26	Wing, Centre	2024	1	7	—	7	4	0	0	16	—	—	—
6	Georgia Roche	24	Five-eighth	2023	2	18	8	10	2	4	0	16	—	—	—
7	Jesse Southwell	19	Halfback	2022	3	27	18	9	0	22	0	44	—	—	1
16	Tayla Predebon	23	Prop	2021	4	34	7 18	9	1	0	0	4	—	—	—
9	Olivia Higgins	32	Hooker	2021	4	35	7 18	10	4	0	0	16	3	3	—
10	Simone Karpani	27	Prop	2021	4	24	6 11	7	0	0	0	0	3	—	—
11	Laishon Albert-Jones	26	Second-row	2023	2	20	10	10	3	0	0	12	—	—	—
12	Yasmin Clydsdale	30	Second-row	2020	5	39	11 18	10	3	0	0	12	3	3	—
13	Hannah Southwell	25	Lock	2018	7	35	3 13 9	10	2	0	0	8	—	—	—
14	Nita Maynard	32	Hooker	2018	7	37	11 4 3 11	8	0	0	0	0	—	—	—
15	Kayla Romaniuk	22	Prop	2022	3	24	14	10	1	0	0	4	—	—	—
19	Evah McEwen	18	Second-row	2024	1	2	—	2	1	0	0	4	3	—	U
17	Viena Tinao	21	Prop	2023	2	10	4	6	0	0	0	0	1	—	—
18	Evie Jones	19	Halfback	2024	1	5	—	5	2	0	0	8	—	—	U
8	Rima Butler	26	Prop	2022	3	20	5 7	8	1	0	0	4	—	—	1
20	Lilly-Ann White	19	Wing	2024	1	5	—	5	3	0	0	12	—	—	U
21	Jules Kirkpatrick	21	Lock, Second-row	—	0	0	—	0	0	0	0	0	—	—	—
22	Jacinta Carter	20	Prop	2023	2	3	2	1	0	0	0	0	—	—	—
–	Grace Kukutai	27	Lock, Second-row	2024	1	3	—	3	0	0	0	0	—	—	—
–	Jayde Herdegen	19	Five-eighth, Halfback	—	0	0	—	0	0	0	0	0	—	—	—
–	Felila Kia	20	Prop	2023	1	3	3	0	0	0	0	0	—	—	—
–	Isabella Waterman	24	Wing	2024	1	1	—	1	0	0	0	0	—	—	—
DV	Leah Ollerton	20	Hooker	—	0	0	—	0	0	0	0	0	—	—	—
IS	Caitlan Johnston-Green	23	Prop	2019	5	23	3 18	2	1	0	0	4	—	3	—
IS	Tamerah Leati	20	Fullback, Centre	—	0	0	—	0	0	0	0	0	—	—	—
DV	Leilani Ahsam	18	Prop	—	0	0	—	0	0	0	0	0	—	—	—

Notes:

- The following players have been signed on a Development contract for 2024:
  - Leilani Ahsam
  - Evah McEwen
  - Leah Ollerton
  - Lilly-Ann White
- On 26 July 2024 it was reported that current New Zealand Black Ferns sevens player Tenika Willison had signed with the Newcastle Knights following a season-ending knee injury to Tamerah Leati. Willison had been signed on a two-year deal, to commence after the conclusion of her commitments at the Paris Olympics.
- On 13 August 2024 the NRL reported that Caitlan Johnston-Green was out for the remainder of the 2024 season. Having sustained an MCL tear at training prior to Round 3, the prospect of surgery and an expected recovery period of eight weeks would see her return to fitness after the 2024 Grand Final.

The Newcastle Knights had announced player signings in several instalments from December 2023 to 24 May 2024.

== North Queensland Cowboys ==
The North Queensland Cowboys were coached by Ricky Henry.
Jersey numbers in the table reflect the Cowboys' Round 9 Team List.

J#	Player	Age	Position(s)	NRLW Career			Past Seasons 2018-23	2024 NRLW					2024 Reps
J#	Player	Age	Position(s)	Debut	S	M	Past Seasons 2018-23	M	T	G	F	Pts	Int'l	Origin	Other
1	Francesca Goldthorp	21	Fullback, Wing	2023	2	16	8	8	2	0	0	8	—	—	—
2	Krystal Blackwell	21	Wing, Fullback	2023	2	15	7	8	1	0	0	4	—	—	1
3	Jakiya Whitfeld	23	Centre	2022	3	20	2 9	9	6	0	0	24	3	0	—
4	Jasmine Peters	22	Centre	2021	4	26	8 9	9	4	0	0	16	—	—	1
5	Lavinia Tauhalaliku	25	Wing	—	1	4	—	4	1	0	0	4	1	—	—
6	Tahlulah Tillett	26	Five-eighth	2021	3	19	4 6	9	0	0	0	0	—	—	—
7	Kirra Dibb	27	Halfback	2019	6	36	3 3 12 9	9	1	18	1	41	—	0	1 1
15	Lily Peacock	19	Prop	2023	2	11	3	8	1	0	0	4	—	0	1 U
9	Emma Manzelmann	22	Hooker	2021	4	30	12 9	9	0	0	0	0	—	3	1
10	Essay Banu	22	Prop	2023	2	8	1	7	0	0	0	0	3	—	1
11	Shaniah Power	27	Second-row	2020	5	23	2 6 5 5	5	0	0	0	0	—	—	—
IJ	Shellie Long	24	Second-row	2023	2	11	8	3	0	0	0	0	—	—	—
13	Bree Chester	22	Lock	2023	2	17	8	9	1	0	0	4	—	—	1
14	Jetaya Faifua	21	Fullback	2021	4	18	7 5	6	1	0	0	4	3	—	—
8	Tallisha Harden	32	Prop	2018	7	36	15 3 9	9	0	0	0	0	—	—	1
16	Sareka Mooka	24	Prop	2023	2	12	6	6	0	0	0	0	3	—	1
22	Libby Surha	20	Wing	2023	2	5	1	4	0	0	0	0	—	—	—
21	Ebony Raftstrand-Smith	19	Wing	2024	1	1	—	1	0	0	0	0	—	—	U
18	Jazmon Tupou-Witchman	20	Prop	2023	2	3	2	1	0	0	0	0	1	—	—
24	Vitalina Naikore	24	Wing	2023	2	11	7	4	2	0	0	8	2	—	—
–	Harata Butler	31	Prop	2023	2	12	8	4	0	0	0	0	—	—	—
C	Tiana Raftstrand-Smith	21	Second-row	2021	4	27	11 8	8	4	0	0	16	—	—	1
C	Makenzie Weale	22	Prop	2022	3	13	4 7	2	0	0	0	0	—	3	—
DV	Caitlin Tanner	18	Halfback	—	0	0	—	0	0	0	0	0	—	—	U
DV	Emily Bella	20	Halfback	—	0	0	—	0	0	0	0	0	—	—	—
IS	Lillian Yarrow	20	Prop	2024	1	3	—	3	0	0	0	0	—	—	—
IS	Alisha Foord	27	Hooker	2023	2	4	1	3	0	0	0	0	—	—	—
IS	China Polata	22	Second-row	2021	3	15	1 8	6	1	0	0	4	—	—	—

Notes:

- The following players were signed on a Development contract for 2024:
  - Emily Bella
  - Caitlin Tanner
- In addition to the full and development members of the squad, Ana Malupo and Kayla Shepherd were named to play in the trail match on 14 July 2024.

== Parramatta Eels ==
The Parramatta Eels were coached by Steve Georgallis.

Jersey numbers in the table reflect the Eels' Round 9 Team List.

J#	Player	Age	Position(s)	NRLW Career			Past Seasons 2018-23	2024 NRLW					2024 Reps
J#	Player	Age	Position(s)	Debut	S	M	Past Seasons 2018-23	M	T	G	F	Pts	Int'l	Origin	Other
1	Abbi Church	26	Fullback	2021	4	26	17	9	1	0	0	4	0	—	1
2	Zali Fay	23	Wing	2022	3	24	15	9	2	0	0	8	—	—	1
3	Rory Owen	20	Centre	2024	1	9	—	9	5	0	0	20	—	—	1
4	Rosie Kelly	24	Centre	2024	1	9	—	9	1	0	0	4	—	—	—
5	Monique Donovan	–	Wing, Centre	2023	2	15	6	9	5	0	0	20	—	—	1
6	Cassey Tohi-Hiku	20	Five-eighth, Centre	2022	3	22	13	9	1	0	0	4	1	—	—
7	Rachael Pearson	31	Halfback	2021	4	27	12 6	9	1	22	0	48	—	3	—
8	Elsie Albert	28	Prop	2020	5	25	15 1	9	2	0	0	8	3	—	—
9	Taneka Todhunter	22	Hooker, Halfback	2023	2	13	4	9	0	0	0	0	—	—	1
10	Madeline Jones	30	Prop, Lock	2023	2	17	8	9	0	0	0	0	—	—	—
11	Chloe Jackson	20	Second-row	2024	1	8	—	8	0	0	0	0	—	—	—
12	Mahalia Murphy	30	Second-row, Centre	2020	3	21	3 9	9	3	0	0	12	2	—	1
13	Breanna Eales	–	Prop, Lock	2023	2	8	4	4	0	0	0	0	—	—	—
14	Rosemarie Beckett	19	Halfback, Fullback	2023	2	10	2	8	4	0	0	16	—	—	—
15	Tyla Amiatu	20	Prop, Lock	2023	2	13	5	8	1	0	0	4	—	—	—
16	Jade Fonua	–	Lock	2023	2	14	5	9	0	0	0	0	1	—	—
17	Lindsay Tui	19	Centre	2022	2	7	3	4	0	0	0	0	3	—	U
18	Mia Middleton	21	Wing, Centre	2023	1	4	4	0	0	0	0	0	—	—	—
19	Pihuka Berryman-Duff	–	Five-eighth	2023	1	9	9	0	0	0	0	0	3	—	—
20	Ruby-Jean Kennard-Ellis	21	Prop	2022	3	14	11	3	0	0	0	0	—	—	—
21	Kate Fallon	20	Centre	—	0	0	—	0	0	0	0	0	1	—	—
23	Tafao Asaua	–	Prop	2024	1	2	—	2	0	0	0	0	—	—	—
DV	Yasmine Baker	–	Fullback	—	0	0	—	0	0	0	0	0	—	—	—
DV	Chelsea Makira	19	Hooker	—	0	0	—	0	0	0	0	0	1	—	—
IS	Kelsey Clark	–	Five-eighth	2023	1	1	1	0	0	0	0	0	—	—	—
IS	Kennedy Cherrington	25	Lock, Prop	2020	5	27	4 17	6	3	0	0	12	—	—	1
IS	Rueben Cherrington	21	Hooker, Lock	2022	3	12	11	1	0	0	0	0	—	—	—
IS	Boss Kapua	19	Second-row	2023	2	5	4	1	0	0	0	0	—	—	—
DV	Aaliyah Haumono	19	Centre	—	0	0	—	0	0	0	0	0	—	—	—

Notes:

- The following players were signed on a Development contract for 2024
  - Aaliyah Haumono (Parramatta Eels, U19 8 games in 2024)
  - Chelsea Makira
  - Yasmine Baker
- Boss Kapua appeared as Noaria Kapua in the 2023 NRLW season.
- Breanna Eales had played 4 matches in the first 5 rounds of the 2024 HNWP prior to her selection on the extended bench for NRLW Round 3. Eales played for Wentworthville Magpies, the second of the Eels' NRLW two feeder-teams.

The Parramatta Eels announced player signings in several instalments from February 2024 to 9 July 2024.

== St. George Illawarra Dragons ==
The St. George Illawarra Dragons were coached by Jamie Soward.

Jersey numbers in the table reflect the Dragons' Round 9 Team List.

J#	Player	Age	Position(s)	NRLW Career			Past Seasons 2018-23	2024 NRLW					2024 Reps
J#	Player	Age	Position(s)	Debut	S	M	Past Seasons 2018-23	M	T	G	F	Pts	Int'l	Origin	Other
1	Teagan Berry	22	Fullback	2020	5	32	23	9	8	0	0	32	—	—	1
2	Kimberley Hunt	31	Wing	2023	2	11	7	4	5	0	0	20	—	—	1
3	Keele Browne	22	Centre	2021	4	23	14	9	3	0	0	12	—	—	1
4	Bobbi Law	27	Centre	2019	6	26	2 11 5	8	2	0	0	8	—	—	1
22	Maatuleio Fotu-Moala	25	Wing	2024	1	6	—	6	3	0	0	12	1	—	—
6	Tyla King	30	Five-eighth	2023	2	13	9	4	0	0	0	0	3	—	—
7	Raecene McGregor	26	Halfback	2018	7	41	12 8 12	9	0	19	0	38	—	—	1
8	Angelina Teakaraanga-Katoa	22	Prop	2022	3	19	1 9	9	0	0	0	0	3	—	—
13	Kasey Reh	18	Hooker, Five-eighth	2024	1	9	—	9	2	0	0	8	—	—	1 U
15	Jamilee Bright	26	Prop	2023	2	16	7	9	0	0	0	0	—	—	—
11	Shenai Lendill	24	Second-row, Centre	2023	2	18	9	9	1	0	0	4	—	—	—
12	Ella Koster	19	Second-row	2023	2	14	8	6	3	0	0	12	—	—	1 U
10	Alexis Tauaneai	19	Lock	2023	2	16	7	9	3	0	0	12	3	—	—
14	Zali Hopkins	22	Five-eighth, Hooker	2022	3	19	10	9	1	0	0	4	—	—	—
9	Sophie Clancy	21	Hooker	2023	2	8	3	5	1	0	0	4	—	—	—
16	Madison Mulhall	20	Prop	2023	2	10	3	7	1	0	0	4	—	—	—
18	Stephanie Hancock	42	Prop	2018	7	40	8 3 22	7	0	0	0	0	—	—	—
17	Charlotte Basham	19	Second-row	2022	2	8	1	7	0	0	0	0	—	—	U
5	Alice Gregory	26	Wing	2024	1	5	—	5	0	0	0	0	—	—	—
19	Jordyn Preston	19	Second-row, Centre	2024	1	2	—	2	0	0	0	0	—	—	—
20	Kaarla Cowan	26	Lock	2023	2	5	4	1	0	0	0	0	—	—	—
21	Bronte Wilson	18	Prop	2024	1	4	—	4	0	0	0	0	—	—	U
–	Tayla Curtis	21	Second-row	—	0	0	—	0	0	0	0	0	—	—	—
–	Maria Paseka	18	Wing	2024	1	1	—	1	0	0	0	0	—	—	U
IS	Sara Sautia	22	Second-row	2021	4	15	9 4	2	0	0	0	0	—	—	—
IS	Margot Vella	25	Wing	2023	2	10	8	2	2	0	0	8	—	—	—
IS	Tara McGrath-West	23	Prop	2022	2	13	13	0	0	0	0	0	—	—	—
DV	Jessica Patea	18	Fullback, Wing	—	0	0	—	0	0	0	0	0	3	—	—
DV	Trinity Tauaneai	17	Lock, Prop	—	0	0	—	0	0	0	0	0	—	—	—
DV	Indie Bostock	17	Centre	—	0	0	—	0	0	0	0	0	—	—	U
DV	Koffi Brookfield	17	Halfback	—	0	0	—	0	0	0	0	0	—	—	—

Notes:

- The following players were signed on a Development contract for 2024:
  - Jessica Patea
  - Trinity Tauaneai
  - Indie Bostock (2024 Illawarra U19s, 2023 Illawarra U17s)
  - Koffi Brookfield (2023 Illawarra U17s)
- On 25 May 2024 the Dragons announced their two squads — St George Dragons and Illawarra Steelers — for the 2024 Harvey Norman Women's Premiership.
- In the Dragons' team list announcement for Round 4 the club indicated that Sara Sautia and Margot Vella, who suffered injuries in the Round 2 match, were out for the remainder of the 2024 season.
- In the Dragons' team list announcement for Round 4 the club indicated that Maria Paseka had been elevated from the Illawarra Steelers' HNWP team into the NRLW team.

== Sydney Roosters ==
The Sydney Roosters were coached by John Strange.

Jersey numbers in the table reflect the Roosters' Grand Final Team List.

J#	Player	Age	Position(s)	NRLW Career			Past Seasons 2018-23	2024 NRLW					2024 Reps
J#	Player	Age	Position(s)	Debut	S	M	Past Seasons 2018-23	M	T	G	F	Pts	Int'l	Origin	Other
1	Samantha Bremner	32	Fullback	2018	4	19	4 5	10	6	0	0	24	—	—	—
2	Jayme Fressard	27	Wing, Five-eighth	2020	5	29	3 4 13	9	6	0	0	24	—	—	—
3	Jessica Sergis	27	Centre	2018	7	33	10 18	5	5	0	0	20	3	3	—
4	Isabelle Kelly	28	Centre, Five-eighth	2018	7	43	30 2	11	3	0	0	12	3	3	—
5	Brydie Parker	24	Wing, Five-eighth	2018	5	28	23	5	4	0	0	16	—	—	—
6	Jocelyn Kelleher	24	Five-eighth, Halfback	2020	5	37	26	11	1	37	0	78	—	—	—
7	Tarryn Aiken	25	Halfback	2019	6	38	19 10	9	3	0	1	13	3	3	—
8	Millie Elliott	26	Prop	2019	6	38	13 7 8	10	0	0	0	0	3	3	—
9	Keeley Davis	24	Hooker	2018	7	43	23 9	11	1	0	0	4	1	3	—
10	Otesa Pule	21	Prop, Second-row	2022	3	27	16	11	2	0	0	8	2	—	—
11	Amber Hall	29	Second-row	2019	6	29	18 1	10	5	0	0	20	3	—	—
12	Olivia Kernick	23	Second-row	2021	4	34	23	11	6	0	0	24	—	3	1
13	Tiana Davison	23	Lock	2022	3	16	8	8	1	0	0	4	1	—	—
14	Tavarna Papalii	19	Lock	2024	1	8	—	8	0	0	0	0	3	—	—
15	Jasmin Strange	21	Centre, Second-row	2022	3	23	1 11	11	1	0	0	4	—	—	1
16	Samantha Economos	30	Second-row	2020	4	13	3 3	7	0	0	0	0	—	—	—
17	Kalosipani Hopoate	20	Prop	2022	3	24	13	11	0	0	0	0	1	—	—
18	Mia Wood	25	Wing	2023	2	14	5	9	5	0	0	20	—	—	—
19	Mya Hill-Moana	22	Prop	2021	4	25	19	6	0	0	0	0	0	—	1
20	Taina Naividi	23	Wing, Lock	2021	2	11	5	6	1	0	0	4	2	—	—
21	Eliza Lopamaua	19	Second-row	2024	1	4	—	4	1	0	0	4	—	—	—
22	Shannon Rose	27	Fullback	2022	1	1	1	0	0	0	0	0	—	—	—
DV	Kayla Jackson	21	Wing	—	0	0	—	0	0	0	0	0	—	—	—
–	Aliyah Nasio	18	Lock, Prop	2024	1	4	—	4	0	0	0	0	—	—	—
–	Imogen Hei	18	Hooker	—	0	0	—	0	0	0	0	0	—	—	U
IS	Corban Baxter	30	Fullback	2019	4	22	22	0	0	0	0	0	—	3	1
IS	Shawden Burton	24	Hooker	2021	3	13	13	0	0	0	0	0	—	—	—
DV	Tyra Ekepati	19	Centre	—	0	0	—	0	0	0	0	0	—	—	—
DV	Taneisha Gray	19	Second-row	—	0	0	—	0	0	0	0	0	—	—	—
DV	Tess McWilliams	19	Prop, Second-row	—	0	0	—	0	0	0	0	0	—	—	—
IS	Liz Tafuna	21	Second-row	—	0	0	—	0	0	0	0	0	—	—	—

Notes:

- The following players were signed on a Development contract for 2024.
  - Tyra Ekepati (who moves to a full contract for the 2025 season)
  - Taneisha Gray
  - Kayla Jackson
  - Tess McWilliams
- Liz Tafuna (U.S.A Rugby 7's) was signed for the 2024 season however was released due to a medical condition prior to the season starting.
- Taina Naividi was added to the squad and played in the trial match (vs Sharks) on 14 July, scoring two tries. Naividi played for the Parramatta Eels in early 2022, but incurred an ACL injury during the 2022 HNWP season and missed the 2022 NRLW, 2023 HNWP and 2023 NRLW seasons.
- Corban Baxter suffered an ACL injury during the trial match, ruling her out of the 2024 NRLW season.
- Shawden Burton, who had rehabilitated an ACL injury sustained during the 2023 NRLW season, tore her hamstring during pre-season training, ruling her out of the 2024 season.
- Brydie Parker sustained a forearm fracture in the trail match, but recovered to return to play in Round 7.
- Eliza Lopamaua was promoted from a Development contract to a full contract in the top 24 as injury replacement. Lopamaua had played three seasons in Under 19 competitions, for Wynnum in 2022 and the Indigenous Academy Sydney Roosters in 2023 and 2024. Lopamaua participated in the NRLW trial match.
- On 19 July 2024, the Roosters announced that Sam Bremner was to come out of retirement to play for the Roosters in the 2024 NRLW season.

The Sydney Roosters announced player signings in several instalments from September 2023 to 30 May 2024.

== Wests Tigers ==
The Wests Tigers were coached by Brett Kimmorley

Jersey numbers in the table reflect the Tigers' Round 9 Team List.

J#	Player	Age	Position(s)	NRLW Career			Past Seasons 2018-23	2024 NRLW					2024 Reps
J#	Player	Age	Position(s)	Debut	S	M	Past Seasons 2018-23	M	T	G	F	Pts	Int'l	Origin	Other
1	Botille Vette-Welsh	28	Fullback	2018	6	28	3 4 5 7	9	2	0	0	8	—	—	1
2	Rebecca Pollard	25	Wing	2023	2	10	4	6	4	0	0	16	—	—	—
3	Leianne Tufuga	22	Centre	2021	4	28	12 9	7	1	0	0	4	3	—	—
4	Rikeya Horne	25	Centre	2018	7	34	7 11 8	8	2	0	0	8	—	—	—
5	Claudia Nielsen	–	Wing	2024	1	2	—	2	1	0	0	4	—	—	—
6	Evie McGrath	18	Five-eighth	2024	1	3	—	3	1	0	0	4	—	—	U
7	Losana Lutu	20	Halfback	2022	3	13	1 3	9	2	1	0	10	2	—	—
8	Sarah Togatuki	26	Prop	2018	6	35	19 7	9	0	0	0	0	3	3	—
9	Ebony Prior	22	Hooker	2023	2	13	8	5	1	0	0	4	—	—	—
10	Christian Pio	24	Prop	2021	4	29	11 9	9	1	0	0	4	3	—	—
11	Brooke Talataina	20	Second-row	2023	2	12	3	9	1	0	0	4	1	—	—
12	Montana Clifford	20	Second-row	2024	1	4	—	4	0	0	0	0	—	—	—
13	Najvada George	25	Lock	2019	4	27	3 6 9	9	0	0	0	0	3	—	—
14	Chelsea Savill	19	Hooker	2024	1	3	—	3	0	0	0	0	—	—	U
15	Natasha Penitani	24	Prop	2024	1	9	—	9	0	0	0	0	1	—	—
16	Tara Reinke	25	Prop	2023	2	16	7	9	0	0	0	0	—	—	—
17	Pauline Piliae-Rasabale	32	Centre, Five-eighth	2023	2	18	9	9	1	13	0	30	3	—	—
18	Claudia Brown	19	Second-row	2024	1	2	—	2	0	0	0	0	1	—	U
19	Tess Staines	22	Wing, Centre	2022	3	11	3 3	5	1	0	0	4	—	—	—
20	Jessica Kennedy	22	Second-row, Lock	2023	2	8	7	1	0	0	0	0	1	—	—
21	Emily Curtain	23	Halfback	2021	2	9	3 6	0	0	0	0	0	—	—	—
22	Iemaima Etuale	18	Lock	—	0	0	—	0	0	0	0	0	—	—	—
–	Imogen Gobran	21	Prop	2023	1	4	4	0	0	0	0	0	—	—	—
–	Amelia Huakau	29	Second-row	2020	2	10	1 9	0	0	0	0	0	—	—	—
IJ	Shaianne McGlone	30	Second-row	2024	1	6	—	6	0	0	0	0	—	—	—
IJ	Tiana-Lee Thorne	18	Wing	2024	1	3	—	3	0	0	0	0	—	—	—
IS	Sophie Curtain	23	Hooker	2023	2	15	9	6	0	0	0	0	—	—	—
IS	Salma Nour	21	Hooker	2023	2	10	4	6	2	0	0	8	—	—	—
IS	Kezie Apps	33	Second-row	2018	7	29	19 7	3	0	0	0	0	3	3	1
IS	Harmony Crichton	19	Wing	2024	1	3	—	3	0	0	0	0	—	—	—

Notes:

- The following players were signed on a Development contract for 2024
  - Chelsea Savill (Illawarra Steelers, U19 10 games in 2024)
  - Claudia Brown (Wests Tigers, U19 7 games in 2024)
  - Iemaima Etuale (Wests Tigers, U19 3 games in 2024) - NRLW full contract in 2025
  - Evie McGrath (Illawarra Steelers, U19 10 games in 2024) - NRLW full contract in 2025

The Wests Tigers announced player signings in several instalments from December 2023.
