= Riley Jones =

Riley Jones may refer to:

- Riley Jones (actor), English actor
- Riley Jones (rugby league) (born 2002), Australian rugby league footballer

== See also ==
- Riley Janes (born 1980), Canadian swimmer
