= Riley "Special" Wallace =

Special
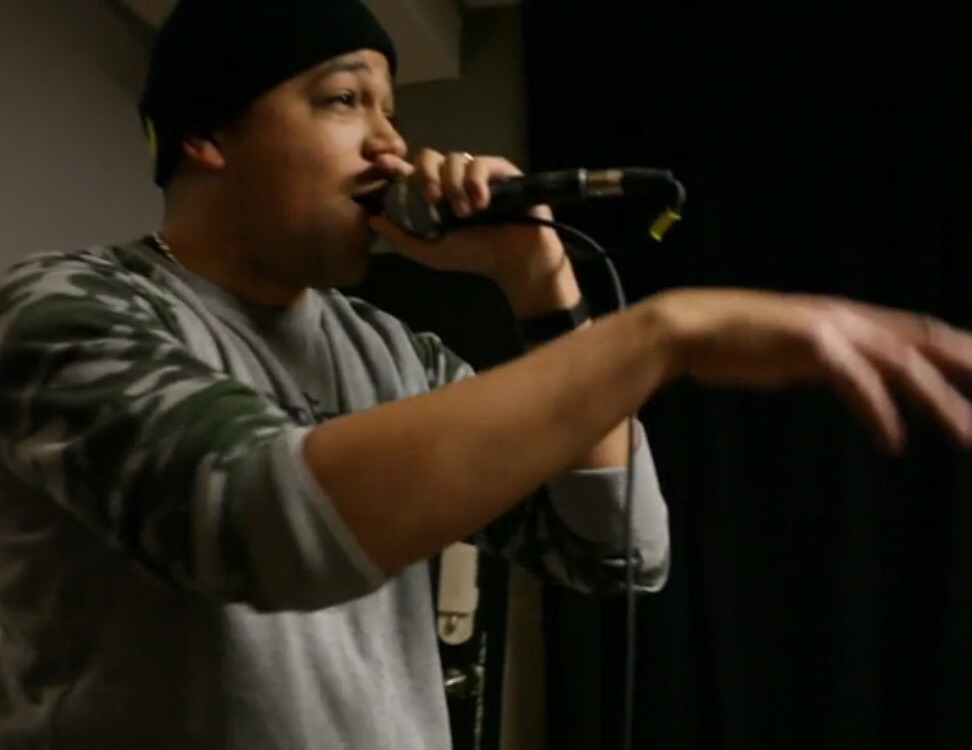
- Special performing in 2015

Background information
- Born: Riley Wallace; January 20, 1983 (age 43)
- Origin: Toronto, Ontario
- Genres: Hip hop
- Occupation: Rapper,
- Years active: 2007-present
- Labels: Jersey Sound Lab, Universal/EMI, Above Average Hip Hop
- Website: toronto.hiphop twitter.com/special

Riley Wallace, known by the stage name Special, is a Canadian rapper. He has collaborated with rappers such as Craig G, El Da Sensei and Sadat X, among others.

== Career ==
In 2009, Special wrote the song "Get Ready To Strike", which was originally intended to inspire the Communications Workers of America members during a Local 6222 rally, but word of it spread to other chapters, who shared it on the internet. The song garnered thousands of views and downloads and was featured in The Wall Street Journal.

As a music artist, Special released two official music videos as part of the E-Team. One, "The Bar Ain't Far Away", was in rotation on Much. The other, "A Rapper's Motivation", was praised by industry insiders and urban bloggers. Special, along with his crew, the E-Team, released two mixtapes (BAFA: The Art of The Remix and Art is Life: The Mixtape) and an album (Art is Life: The Album), before they signed a major label deal with Universal/EMI Canada. They released the song "T-Shirt Time" in 2011, which has over two million plays. Their subsequent release, Get Right, featuring Tasha The Amazon, was released later that same year.

As a solo artist, Special has numerous projects and has worked with artists including Sadat X, Craig G, Money B and El Da Sensei, among others. He is also closely affiliated with Jersey Sound Lab and has released a collaborative project with Internal Quest.

== Discography ==
=== Singles ===
- T-Shirt Time (2011)
- "Get Right featuring Tasha The Amazon" (2012)
- "Never Know Me" (with Lilly Mason 2014)

=== Collaborative albums ===
- Special and Internal Quest — Engineered To Win (2012)
- Special and Tony Blount — Special & Tony Blount EP (2014)

=== EPs ===
- Mind's Eye (2013)
- Oakland Masters (2014)
