= Troy Rugless =

Australian rugby league footballer and coach

Personal information
- Full name: Troy Rugless
- Born: Australia

Playing information
- Position: Stand-off
Club
Years	Team	Pld	T	G	FG	P
1993–94	London Crusaders	15	4	0	0	16

Coaching information
Club
Years	Team	Gms	W	D	L	W%
	La Perouse United	0	0	0	0
- Source: As of 24 July 2024

Troy Rugless is an Australian former professional rugby league footballer who played in the 1990s and 2000s, and has coached in the 2000s and 2010s. He played for the London Crusaders as a five-eighth.

In 2010, Rugless was coach of La Perouse United RLFC.

His son Kobe Rugless is a professional rugby league footballer who, like his father, also played for London.
