= Riley Edward Robinson =

American politician (1847–1921)

Member of the Florida House of Representatives from the Nassau County district
- In office 1883–1885; 1885–1887

Personal details
- Born: November 4, 1847 Tennessee, U.S.
- Died: February 1921 (aged 73)
- Party: Republican

Riley Edward Robinson (November 4, 1847 – February 1921) was a carpenter, minister in the Episcopal Church, councilman, custom house inspector, and state legislator in Florida. He served on the city council in Fernandina, Florida from 1875 to 1879 and from 1883 to 1890, as well as from 1892 to 1894. He represented Nassau County in the Florida House of Representatives in 1883 and 1885.

He was born in Tennessee in 1847. He was described as having been enslaved and categorized as "mulatto". He moved to Alachua County, Florida in 1858 and lived there until after the American Civil War when he moved to Duval County, Florida and apprenticed as a carpenter. He moved to Nassau County in 1870.

He belonged to the mason fraternal order. He was a leader in Nassau County's Republican Party. He was listed as a state legislator as R. E. Robinson. He served as postmaster of the Kings Ferry post office in Nassau County.

The Christian Advocate noted his assigned area.

== See also ==
- Samuel Petty
