= Ryan Rivett (rugby league) =

Australian league rugby player

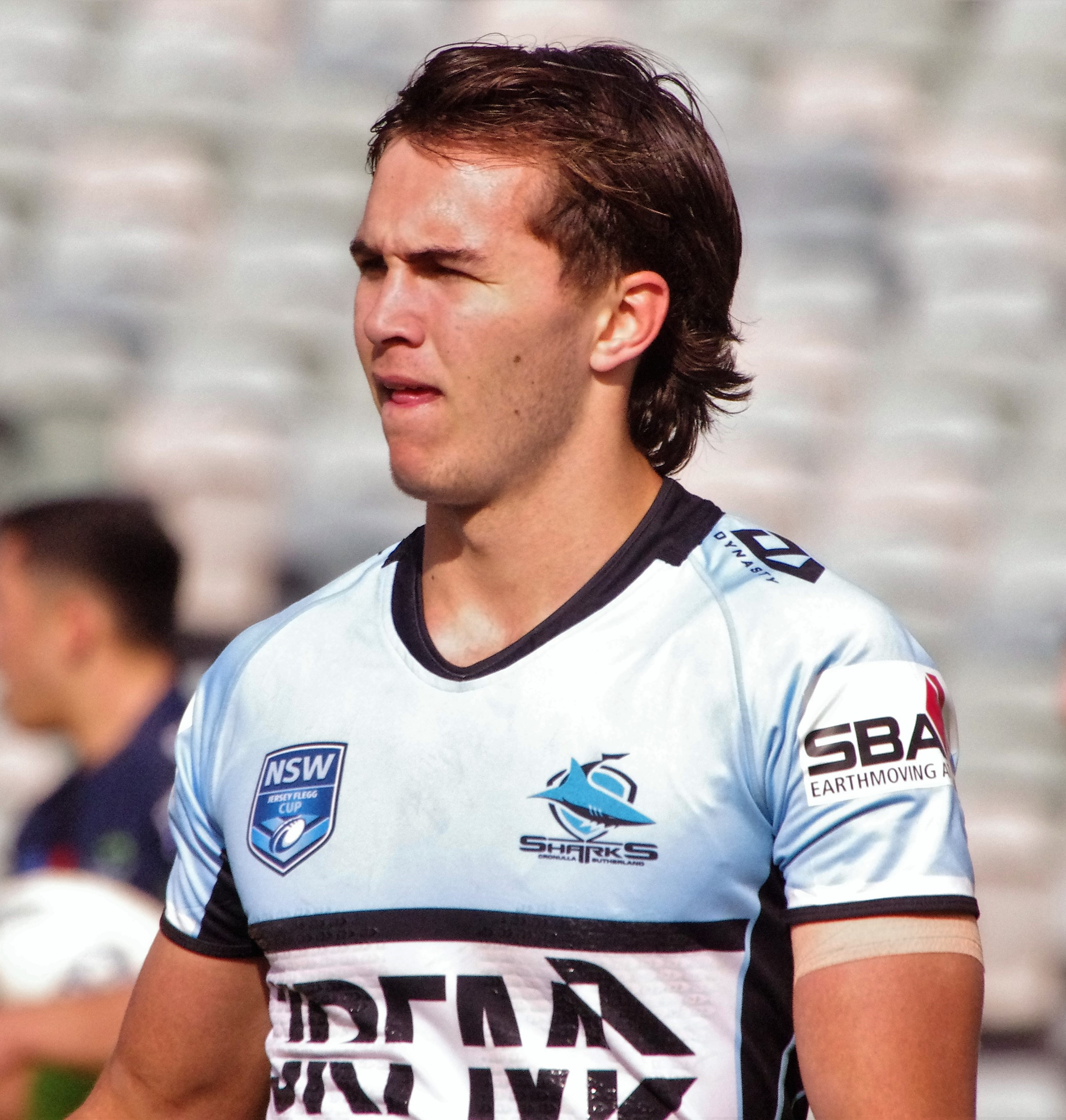

Personal information
- Born: 2 May 2002 (age 23) Gosford, New South Wales, Australia
- Height: 187 cm (6 ft 2 in)
- Weight: 86 kg (13 st 8 lb)

Playing information
- Position: Halfback, Five-eighth
Club
Years	Team	Pld	T	G	FG	P
2023	Newcastle Knights	1	0	0	0	0
2024	Toulouse Olympique	27	12	21	0	90
	Total	28	12	21	0	90
- Source: As of 30 July 2025

Ryan Rivett (born 2 May 2002) is an Australian professional rugby league footballer who currently plays for Mackay Cutters in the Queensland Cup. His positions are halfback and five-eighth.

He previously played for the Newcastle Knights in the National Rugby League and Toulouse Olympique in the Betfred Championship.

== Background ==
Born in Gosford, New South Wales, Rivett moved to the Gold Coast, Queensland as a youngster and played his junior rugby league for the Burleigh Bears, before being signed by the Cronulla-Sutherland Sharks.

He is of Indigenous Australian descent.

== Playing career ==
=== Early years ===
Rivett played for the Cronulla-Sutherland Sharks' S. G. Ball Cup team in 2021, and the Jersey Flegg Cup team in 2022.

=== 2023 ===
In 2023, Rivett joined the Newcastle Knights and trained with the NRL side during the pre-season, also playing in a trial match against his former club Cronulla. In round 3 of the 2023 NRL season, he made his first grade debut for Newcastle against the Dolphins.

=== 2024 ===
In 2024, Rivett signed a 2-year contract with French club Toulouse Olympique after gaining a release from his Knights contract.

=== 2025 ===
In 2025, Rivett returned to Australia, joining the Mackay Cutters in the Queensland Cup. In February, he played in a pre-season trial for the North Queensland Cowboys and during the season was named in several of their 21-man squads.
