= Tom Cant =

Australian rugby league footballer (born 2002)

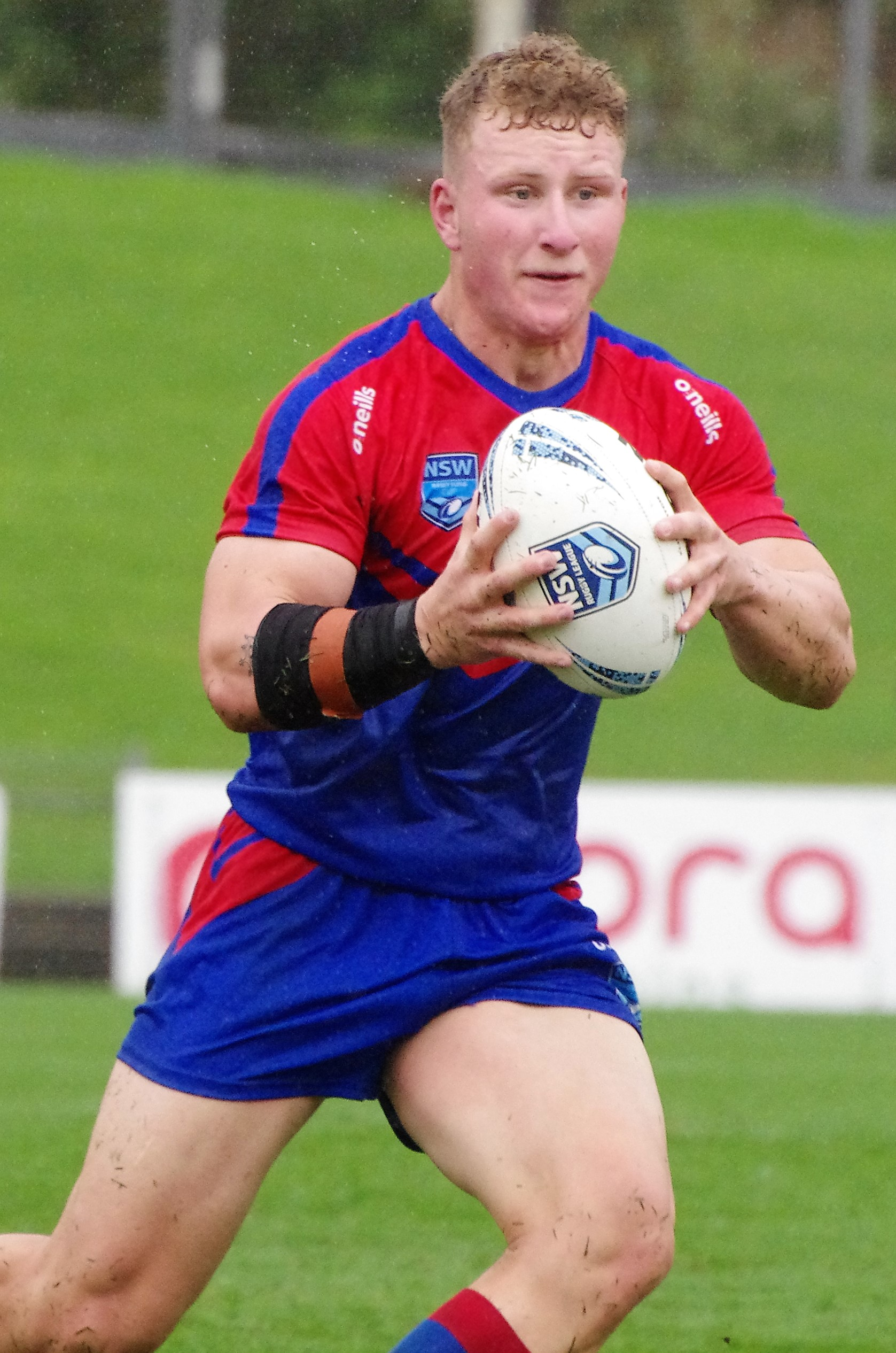

Personal information
- Full name: Thomas Cant
- Born: 13 June 2002 (age 24) East Maitland, New South Wales, Australia
- Height: 181 cm (5 ft 11 in)
- Weight: 96 kg (15 st 2 lb)

Playing information
- Position: Second-row, Lock
Club
Years	Team	Pld	T	G	FG	P
2023–	Newcastle Knights	40	0	0	0	0
- Source: As of 4 October 2026

Thomas Cant (born 13 June 2002) is an Australian professional rugby league footballer who plays as a second-row forward and lock for the Newcastle Knights in the National Rugby League.

== Background ==
Born in East Maitland, New South Wales, Cant played his junior rugby league for the East Maitland Griffins, before being signed by the Newcastle Knights.

== Playing career ==
=== Early years ===
Cant rose through the ranks for the Newcastle Knights, playing with their Harold Matthews Cup team in 2018, the S. G. Ball Cup side from 2019 to 2021 and finally the Jersey Flegg Cup team in 2022, captaining the side that year.

=== 2023 ===
In 2023, Cant got the chance to play in both of Newcastle's NRL trial matches during the pre-season. In round 3 of the 2022 NRL season, he made his first grade debut for Newcastle against the Dolphins.

=== 2024 & 2025 ===
Cant was limited to only three appearances with Newcastle in the 2024 NRL season. In the 2025 NRL season, Cant played a total of 18 games for Newcastle which saw the club finish with the Wooden Spoon for a fifth time.

=== 2026 ===
Cant played 18 matches for Newcastle in the 2026 NRL season including their 2026 NRL Grand Final loss to the Sydney Roosters.
