= Riley Parker =

Riley Parker may refer to:

- Riley Parker (Neighbours), a character from the Australian television soap opera Neighbours
- Riley Parker (soccer), an American professional women's soccer player
- William Riley Parker, an American scholar noted for his works on John Milton
