= Kobe Rugless =

Australian rugby league footballer

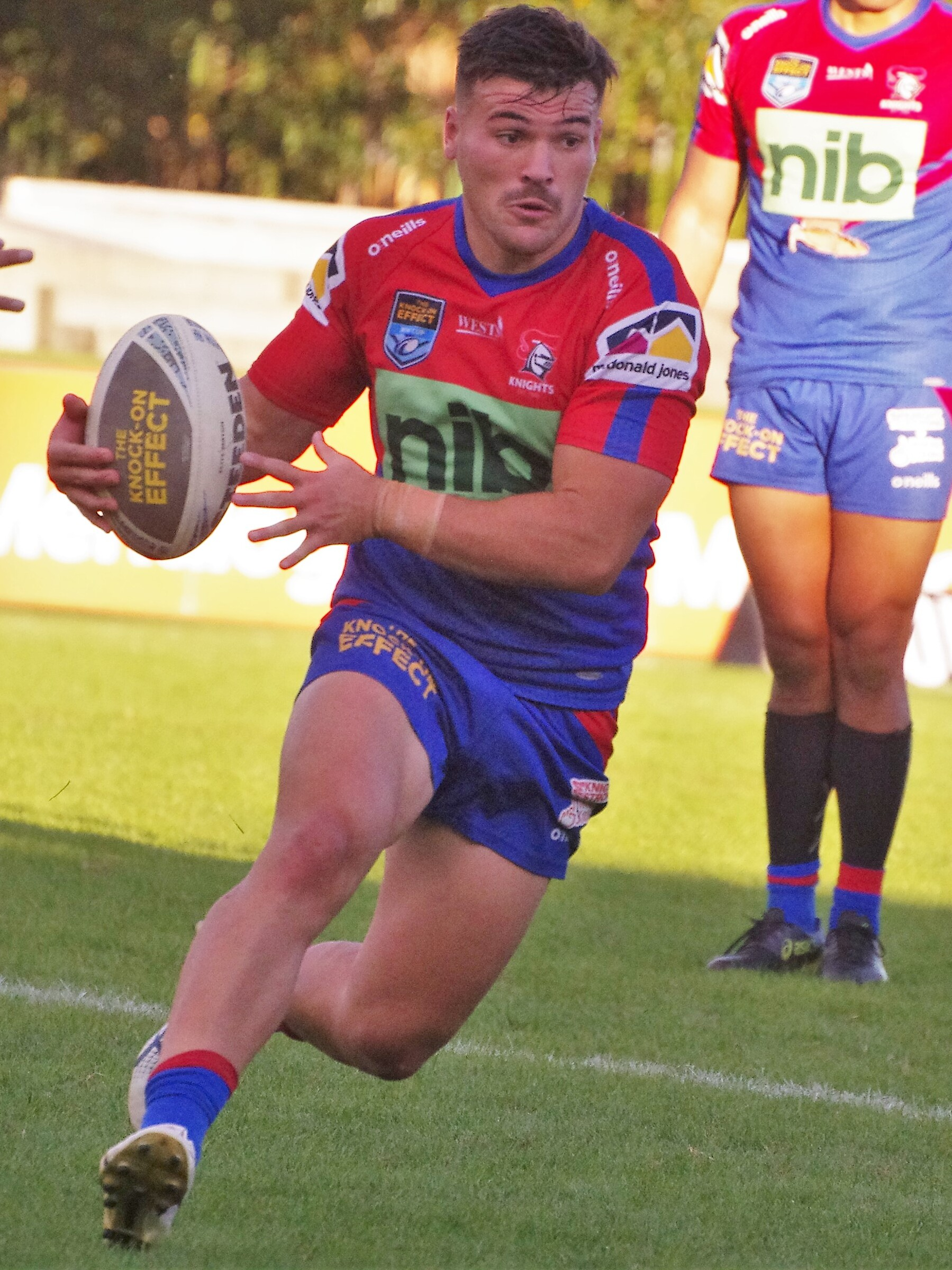

Personal information
- Full name: Kobe Rugless
- Born: 7 June 2001 (age 25) Sydney, Australia
- Height: 175 cm (5 ft 9 in)
- Weight: 88 kg (13 st 12 lb)

Playing information
- Position: Hooker, Five-eighth
Club
Years	Team	Pld	T	G	FG	P
2025	Hunslet	11	1	0	0	4
2025(loan)	→ Salford Red Devils	2	0	0	0	0
2025	London Broncos	5	0	0	0	0
	Total	18	1	0	0	4
- Source: As of 22 November 2026

Kobe Rugless (born 7 June 2001) is an Australian professional rugby league footballer who plays as a hooker or lock for the Ipswich Jets in the Queensland Cup.

He has previously played for Hunslet in the RFL Championship, and spent time away from Hunslet on loan at the Salford Red Devils in the Super League. Rugless has also played for the London Broncos in the Betfred Championship. He played for the North Sydney Bears, Newcastle Knights and the Blacktown Workers in the NSW Cup.

== Background ==
Rugless was born in Hurstville, Sydney, Australia. His father Troy Rugless played as a professional rugby league footballer for the London Crusaders, as well as playing in reserve grade for Eastern Suburbs and the South Sydney Rabbitohs.

He played for the Paddington Colts as a junior. Rugless played for the NSW Koori U16 at representative level. He played for the NSW Combined Independent Schools side.

He graduated through the Sydney Roosters junior system, playing in their Harold Matthews, SG Ball and Jersey Flegg sides. He moved mid-season to the Newcastle Knights system in 2022 and played in their Jersey Flegg side.

He is a junior Australian boxing champion.

== Career ==
Rugless was contracted to the Sydney Roosters, and made his debut in May 2021 for their feeder club, the North Sydney Bears against the Canberra Raiders. He scored a try in his only game in the 2021 NSW Cup, before leaving at the end of year. He was named in an NRL trial game against the Wests Tigers in February 2021.

In 2022 he moved to the Newcastle Knights and played 14 NSW Cup matches over the course of the 2022 and 2023 NSW Cup seasons. He was named in the development squad, just outside of the Knights NRL top squad in 2023.

Midway through the 2023 season Rugless moved to the Manly Warringah Sea Eagles, featuring 20 times in the NSW Cup over the course of one a half seasons playing for Manly's feeder club, the Blacktown Workers. He played in a pre-season National Rugby League trial game for the Manly Sea Eagles in 2024.

Rugless moved to Hunslet in the RFL Championship in November 2024, ahead of the 2025 RFL Championship season.

In June 2025 he was subject of a highly controversial loan from Hunslet to the Salford Red Devils in the Betfred Super League. He made his Salford debut in the Super League against Hull FC.

In August 2025 the London Broncos bought out the remainder of his Hunslet contract.

He signed for the Ipswich Jets ahead of their 2026 Queensland Cup season.
