= Tyson Gamble =

Australian rugby league player (born 1996)

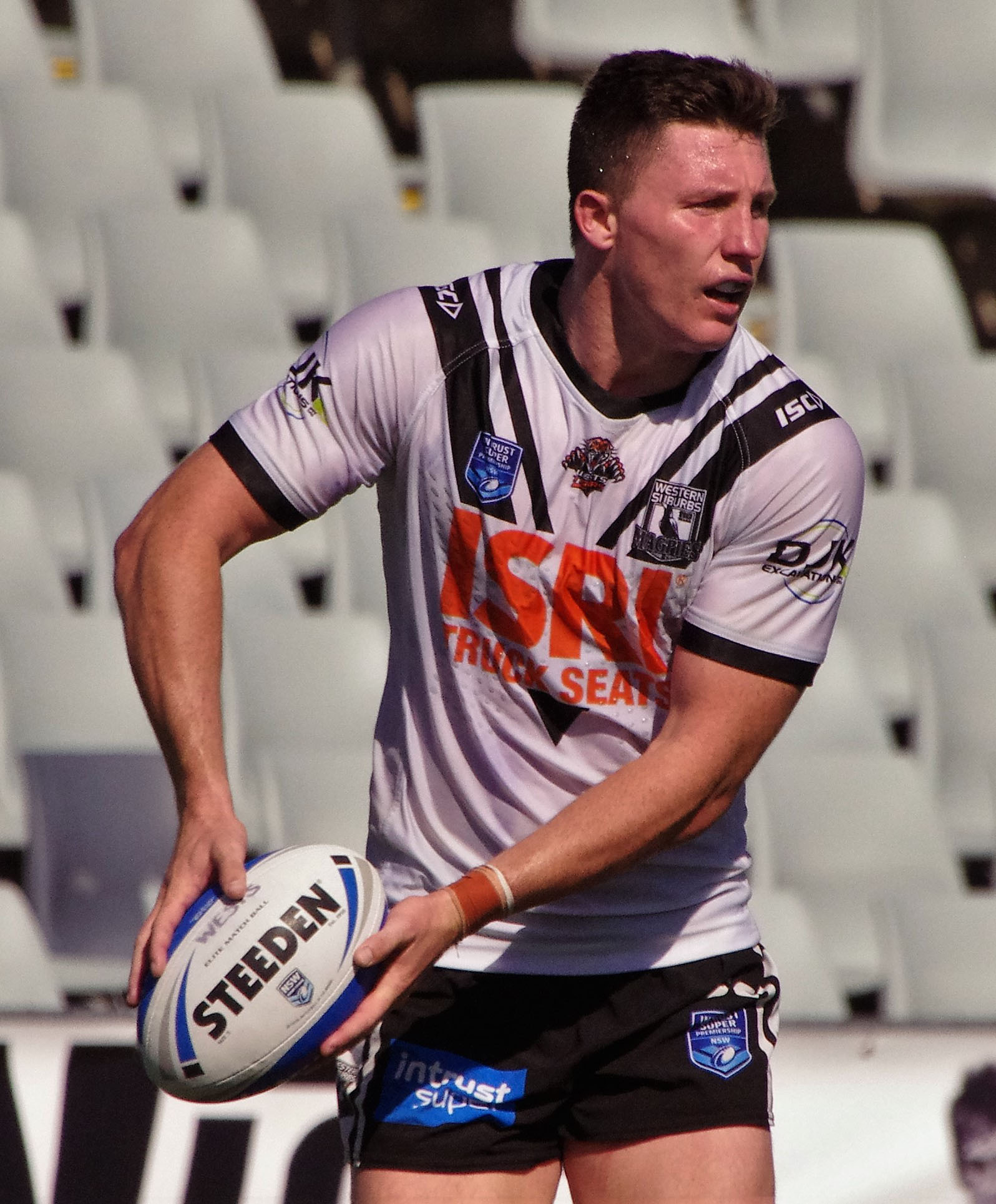

Personal information
- Born: 21 June 1996 (age 30) Brisbane, Queensland, Australia
- Height: 189 cm (6 ft 2 in)
- Weight: 95 kg (14 st 13 lb)

Playing information
- Position: Five-eighth, Halfback
Club
Years	Team	Pld	T	G	FG	P
2018	Wests Tigers	1	0	0	0	0
2020–22	Brisbane Broncos	24	1	3	2	12
2023–26	Newcastle Knights	45	8	1	1	35
2027–	Catalans Dragons	0	0	1	0	0
	Total	70	9	5	3	47
- Source: As of 16 November 2026

Tyson Gamble (born 21 June 1996) is an Australian professional rugby league footballer who plays as five-eighth and halfback for the Catalans Dragons in the Super League.

He previously played for the Wests Tigers and Brisbane Broncos in the NRL.

== Background ==
Gamble was born in Brisbane, Queensland, Australia. Gamble played his junior football at Albany Creek and moved to the Redcliffe Dolphins at age 16.

== Playing career ==
=== Early years ===
In 2016, when Gamble played in the Redcliffe Dolphins’ Brisbane Rugby League team, he won the Don McLennan Trophy for best player in the grand final. Gamble progressed through to the grades to play for the Redcliffe Dolphins senior side in the Queensland Cup. In May 2017, he signed a 2-year contract with the Wests Tigers starting in 2018.

=== 2018 ===
Gamble started the season playing for the Wests Tigers Intrust Super Premiership NSW team, Western Suburbs. He played a part in the Magpies’ early successes that year – scoring a try in Round 1, and playing a leading role in his team's consecutive wins early in the year.

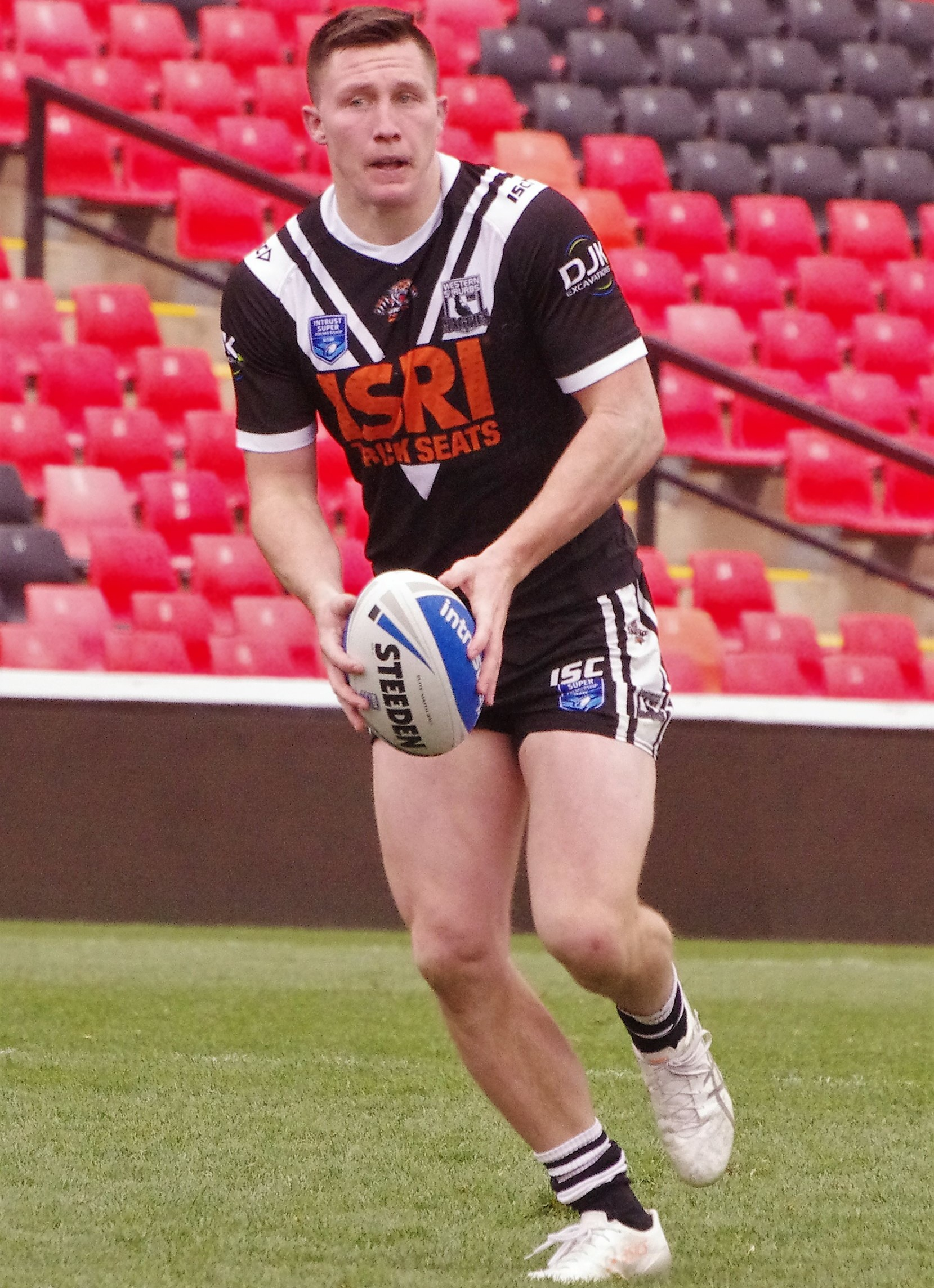
Gamble playing for the Wests Tigers in 2018

In round 15 of the 2018 NRL season, he made his NRL debut for the Wests Tigers against the Canberra Raiders, but it was his only appearance for the season.

=== 2019 ===
On 6 May, Gamble was selected for the Canterbury Cup NSW residents side to play against the Queensland residents representative team.

On 25 June, it was announced that Gamble had been released from the Wests Tigers, effective immediate, to return to Queensland.

On 29 June, Gamble was a late inclusion for his former junior club, the Redcliffe Dolphins, in their Round 15 clash against the previously undefeated Sunshine Coast Falcons. Redcliffe won the match with Gamble kicking five conversions.

=== 2020 ===
In round 19, Gamble made his first start for Brisbane after appearing before off the bench. In the first sixty seconds of the game, Gamble was knocked unconscious after attempting to tackle Parramatta player Maika Sivo. He played no further part in the match which ended in a 26-12 defeat.

=== 2021 ===
In round 8, Gamble was called into the Brisbane side for their match against the Gold Coast. Brisbane won the game 36-28 after being down 22-0. It was Gamble's first win in the NRL. Commentator Billy Slater said, "He's the one organising play, he's the one talking and pointing. He is getting to the points and getting these plays on. He was outstanding in this game, he just gave so much structure and gave Milford that freedom."

In round 10 against Manly-Warringah, Gamble was sent to the sin bin during the club's 50-6 loss.

On 16 August, Gamble was suspended by the NRL for two matches after being placed on report for using a crusher tackle during Brisbane's 21-20 loss against the Sydney Roosters.

=== 2022 ===
In September, Gamble signed a two-year contract with the Newcastle Knights starting in 2023.

=== 2023 ===
In round 7 of the 2023 NRL season, Gamble scored a try and kicked one field goal during Newcastle's 16-15 golden point extra-time loss against Penrith. In round 24, Gamble scored two tries for Newcastle in their 42-6 victory over Canterbury. Gamble played a total of 24 games for Newcastle in the 2023 NRL season as the club finished 5th on the table. Gamble played in both finals games as Newcastle were eliminated in the second week of the finals by the New Zealand Warriors.

=== 2024 ===
On 5 July, Gamble re-signed with the Newcastle outfit on a two-year extension. Gamble played 14 games for Newcastle in the 2024 NRL season as the club finished 8th and qualified for the finals. They were eliminated in the first week of the finals by North Queensland.

=== 2025 ===
Gamble was limited to only six appearances with Newcastle in the 2025 NRL season as the club finished with the Wooden Spoon for a fifth time.

== Statistics ==
Year	Team	Games	Tries	Goals	FGs	Pts
2018	Wests Tigers	1				
2020	Brisbane Broncos	2				
2021	Brisbane Broncos	13	1	3	1	11
2022	Brisbane Broncos	9			1	
2023	Newcastle Knights	24	6	1	1	27
2024	Newcastle Knights	14	2			8
2025	Newcastle Knights	6				
2026	Newcastle Knights	1				
2027	Catalans Dragons					
	Totals	70	9	4	3	47
