= Raili =

Female given name

Raili is a Finnish feminine given name that may refer to

- Raili Halttu (1909–2006), Finnish sprint runner
- Raili Hoviniemi (1936–2018), Finnish Olympic gymnast
- Raili Kauppi (1920–1995), Finnish philosopher
- Raili Pietilä (1926–2021), Finnish architect
- Raili Riuttala (1933–2024), Finnish swimmer
- Raili Sallinen, Finnish ski orienteering competitor

== See also ==
- Riley (given name)
