= Tevita Toloi =

Fiji international rugby league footballer

Personal information
- Born: 5 March 2002 (age 24) Macuata, Fiji
- Height: 190 cm (6 ft 3 in)
- Weight: 100 kg (220 lb; 15 st 10 lb)

Playing information
- Position: Second-row, Centre
Representative
Years	Team	Pld	T	G	FG	P
2022–	Fiji	1	0	0	0	0
- Source: As of 1 November 2022

Tevita Toloi is a Fijian professional rugby league footballer who plays as a centre and second-row forward. He has played for Fiji at international level. He currently plays for Villefranche XIII Aveyron in the Super XIII.

== Background ==
Toloi was born in Macuata, Fiji. He grew up in Rockhampton, Queensland and played his junior rugby league for the Yeppoon Seagulls. He attended Wavell State High School before being signed by the Newcastle Knights.

== Playing career ==
=== Club career ===
Toloi was contracted to the Newcastle Knights in the NRL.

=== International career ===
In October 2022 Toloi was called up as a late replacement in the Fiji squad for the 2021 Rugby League World Cup.

In October 2022 he made his international début for the Fiji Bati side against Scotland.
