= Phoenix Crossland =

New Zealand international rugby league footballer

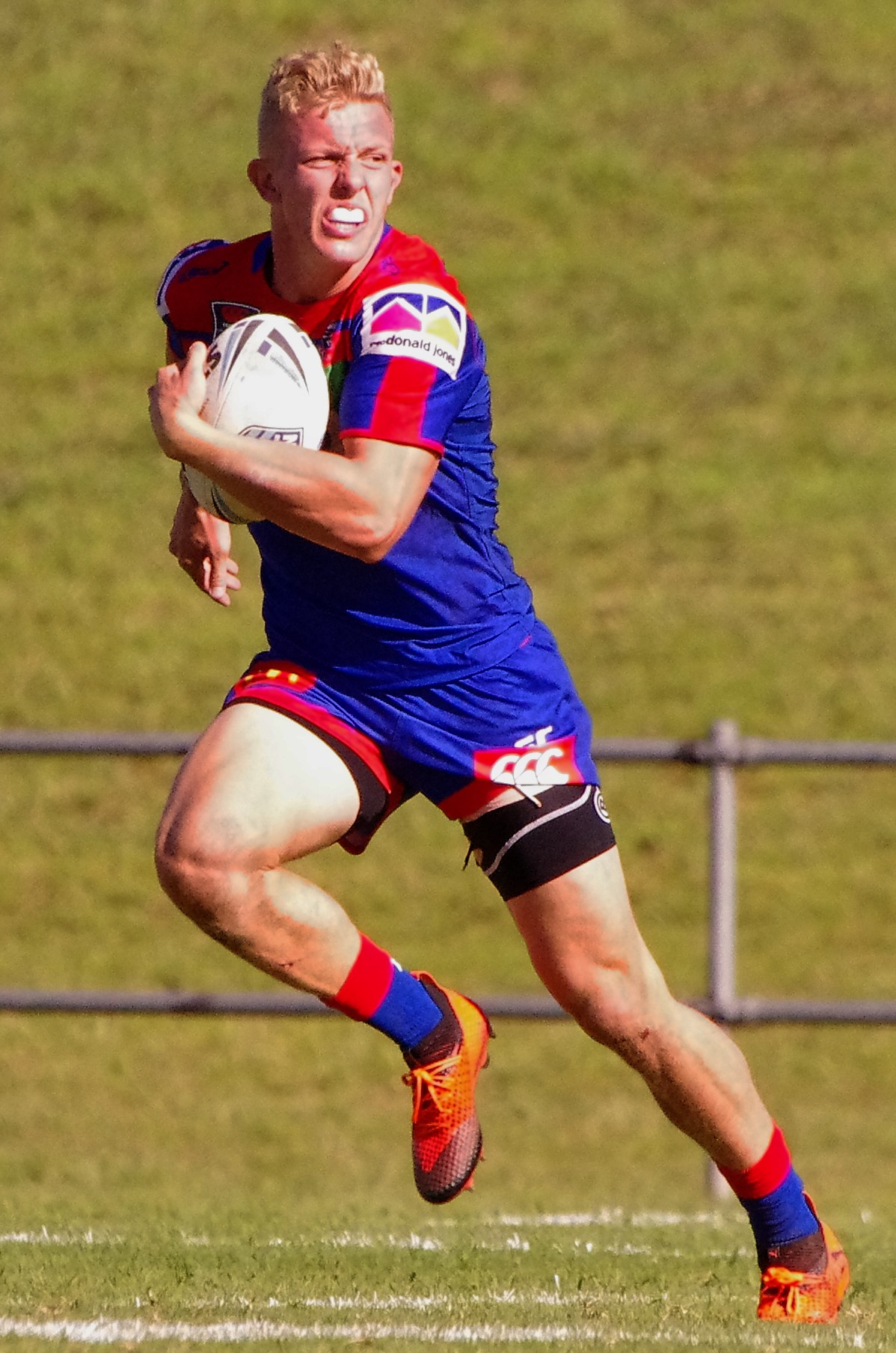

Personal information
- Born: 7 July 2000 (age 26) Wellington, New Zealand
- Height: 183 cm (6 ft 0 in)
- Weight: 100 kg (15 st 10 lb)

Playing information
- Position: Hooker, Halfback, Lock, Five-eighth
Club
Years	Team	Pld	T	G	FG	P
2019–	Newcastle Knights	132	13	1	0	54
Representative
Years	Team	Pld	T	G	FG	P
2024–26	New Zealand	8	2	0	0	8
- Source: As of 19 November 2026

Phoenix Crossland (born 7 July 2000) is a New Zealand professional rugby league footballer who plays as a hooker or lock for the Newcastle Knights in the National Rugby League and for New Zealand at international level.

He played as a five-eighth and halfback earlier in his career.

== Background ==
Crossland was born in Wellington, New Zealand, and moved to Newcastle, New South Wales, Australia with his family as a child.

He played his junior rugby league for the Erina Eagles, before being signed by the Newcastle Knights.

== Playing career ==
=== Early years ===
In 2018, Crossland captained the Newcastle S. G. Ball Cup team and played 9 games for their Jersey Flegg Cup team. In November 2018, he re-signed with the Newcastle outfit on a three-year contract until the end of 2021.

=== 2019 ===
In 2019, Crossland played most of his football for the Knights' Canterbury Cup NSW side. On 1 July, he was named 20th man for the New South Wales under-20s side. In round 16 of the 2019 NRL season, he made his NRL debut for the Newcastle club, in a loss to the New Zealand Warriors, becoming the first person to play for Newcastle born in the 2000s.

=== 2020 ===
Crossland made six appearances for Newcastle in the 2020 NRL season as the club reached the finals for the first time since 2013.

=== 2021 ===
Crossland made nine appearances for Newcastle in the 2021 NRL season as the club reached the finals for a second consecutive year. Crossland did not feature in the club's elimination final loss to Parramatta.

=== 2022 ===
Crossland made a total of 19 appearances for Newcastle in the 2022 NRL season scoring one try as the club finished 14th on the table.

=== 2023 ===
Crossland played a total of 25 games for Newcastle in the 2023 NRL season as the club finished 5th on the table. Crossland played in both finals games as Newcastle were eliminated in the second week of the finals by the New Zealand Warriors.

=== 2024 ===
Crossland played every game for Newcastle in the 2024 NRL season as the club finished 8th and qualified for the finals. Crossland played in the clubs elimination final loss against North Queensland.

At the end of the season, Crossland was selected to make his test debut for New Zealand. He scored his first try in his second game whilst also being picked as New Zealand's MVP in the same game.

=== 2025 ===
On 20 March, Newcastle announced that Crossland had re-signed with the club for a further two years. Crossland made 23 appearances for Newcastle in the 2025 NRL season as the club finished with the wooden spoon for a fifth time.

=== 2026 ===
During Newcastle's preliminary final match against the Penrith Panthers, Crossland was sent off in the first half after a hip-drop tackle on Panthers halfback Nathan Cleary, resulting in an double compound fracture to his lower leg. Newcastle went on to win the match 22–14. Crossland was referred straight to the NRL Judiciary and he was suspended for four matches.

== Statistics ==
Year	Team	Games	Tries	Goals	Pts
2019	Newcastle Knights	1			
2020	Newcastle Knights	6	1		4
2021	Newcastle Knights	9	1	1	6
2022	Newcastle Knights	19	1		4
2023	Newcastle Knights	25	6		24
2024	Newcastle Knights	24	1		4
2025	Newcastle Knights	23			
2026	Newcastle Knights	24	3		12
2027	Newcastle Knights				
	Totals	132	13	1	54

*denotes season competing
