= Internal Quest =

American rapper

- Born: Terry Booker; July 4, 1985 (age 40)
- Origin: Newark, New Jersey, U.S.
- Genres: Hip hop
- Occupations: Rapper, Audio Engineer, Producer, Music Consultant, Poet, Songwriter, Mentor
- Years active: 2006-present
- Label: Jersey Sound Lab
- Website: jerseysoundlab.com

Terry Booker (born July 4, 1985), professionally known as Internal Quest, is an American rapper. He began rapping in the early 2000s. He has worked with notable hip-hop artists such as El Da Sensei, Sadat X, Craig G and Trick-Trick

== Biography ==
Terry Booker (born July 4, 1985 in Newark, New Jersey), professionally known as Internal Quest is an audio engineer, music producer, and youth mentor. He began his career in the Barringer High School marching band, producing for local artists and competing in area beat battles and talent shows. Internal Quest attended the Institute of Audio Research in New York City graduating with high honors. In 2010, he became the lead engineer and general manager of Jersey Sound Lab Recordings based in Newark, NJ. Internal Quest calls his sound, style and delivery of his music as, “Hip-Hop: With a little innovation.”

Internal Quest gained notoriety when he collaborated with Sydney, Australia based DJ “Nino Brown” in 2010 where they released “Flight 973 to Sydney”, an international Mix CD that reached the United Kingdom, Saudi Arabia, Canada, and Australia. Flight 973 to Sydney featured a remixed single “Where We @?” with Bahraini former auto racing driver, Hamad Al Fardan that gained underground success due to its diverse mix of six artists from five countries.

Universal Records Australia DJ Nino Brown was impressed with "Flight 973 to Sydney" which led to a production credit on his Blazin' 2011 3-disk compilation. The compilation also featured Internal Quest as a rapper on Prinnie Stevens single "Lion".

Internal Quest has since gone on to release several singles, an album and features within underground hip hop.

His latest Release "Fade Away" (2018) was featured on "Fresh Finds" Spotify Editorial Playlist

== Discography ==
EP and Compilations
- Flight 973 to Sydney” with DJ Nino Brown (2010)
- “Jersey Sound Lab Presents: All Hands On Deck” (2011)
- “Ideology” (2013)
- "We Came From Chains" (2018)

Features and Singles
- “Talk of the City” with El Da Sensei (2010) (Germany)
- Lion” (Remix) with Prinnie Stevens (2010) (Australia)
- Problems” (Remix) featuring El Da Sensei, Sadat X, Craig G (2011) (USA)
- Comes Around” featuring El Da Sensei (2011) (Japan)
- We Gon Turn It Out” featuring Jas Mace from (2011) (United States)
- I’m On the Edge” featuring DJ Hush (2012)
- ”Goin Dummy” (2012)
- “No Shade” from Blood Album with Scifi Stu (2012) (Scotland)
- “We go to war” with Мс Атила (2014) (Bulgaria)
- "Got It" with Sicaa from Organic Symposium V.A Lp on Highlife Recordings (2017) (France)
- "CAPO" (2017)
- "PACK" (2018) (USA)
- "Last Days" with Jody McCoy (2018)
- "Fade Away" (2018)
Engineering Credit
- “The Wait Is Over” Intro from Blazin 2011 with DJ Nino Brown (2011)
- All Night” with Queen Aminah and Rueben Toro (2010)
- “XL” album with El Da Sensei and Sadat X (2018)
