= Viena Tinao =

Samoa international rugby league player

Personal information
- Born: 14 October 2002 (age 24) Mount Druitt, New South Wales, Australia
- Height: 162 cm (5 ft 4 in)
- Weight: 97 kg (15 st 4 lb)

Playing information
- Position: Prop
Club
Years	Team	Pld	T	G	FG	P
2023–25	Newcastle Knights	15	0	0	0	0
Representative
Years	Team	Pld	T	G	FG	P
2024	Samoa	1	0	0	0	0
- Source: As of 4 November 2026

Viena Tinao (born 14 October 2002) is an Australian professional rugby league footballer who currently plays for the Newcastle Knights in the NRL Women's Premiership. Her position is prop.

== Background ==
Tinao was born in Mount Druitt, New South Wales.

== Playing career ==
=== 2023 ===
In 2023, Tinao played for the Illawarra Steelers in the NSWRL Women's Premiership.

In May, she signed a 1-year contract with the Newcastle Knights. In round 1 of the 2023 NRLW season, she made her NRLW debut for the Knights against the St. George Illawarra Dragons.
