= Riley Schillaci =

American performance artist

- Born: December 22, 1982 (age 43); Rochester, New York, United States
- Occupations: performance artist (sword swallower, fire artist)
- Years active: 2007 – present
- Known for: America's Got Talent contestant, season 6. Ripley's Believe It or Not
- Website: oddgirl.net

Riley Schillaci (born December 22, 1982) is an American performance artist, specializing in sword swallowing as one of few professional female sword swallowers in the world.

== Early life and inception of career ==
Riley Schillaci was born on December 22, 1982, in Rochester, New York. In her childhood, she observed a relative who swallowed forks and knives and stuck licorice up his nose, only to have it reemerge through his mouth. At around 14, Schillaci decided to try swallowing objects because she believed the talent was genetic. She moved on to swallowing drum sticks and glow sticks, and by post-college she swallowed swords. She swallowed her first sword (17 inches (43 cm)) in a sword store. Her second sword (36 inches (91 cm)) was ordered by mail. Her parents held it while she "eased up into it ... 'until it just barely hit the bottom of my stomach'". She cut off the protruding part, making the sword 19 inches (48 cm). Although her parents wanted her to be a singer, they supported her as a sword swallower by attending some of her performances.

== Career ==
=== Performance ===
Schillaci was a featured season 6 contestant on America's Got Talent but was rejected by the judges because she did not smile enough. One of fewer than 20 female sword swallowers in the world, she worked with Ripley's Believe It or Not! and is a member of the Sword Swallowers Association International. She uses rum to disinfect her sword before swallowing it. Schillaci said that her throat becomes faintly sore after sword swallowing a few times per week.

Besides sword swallowing, her acts include fire eating, fire breathing, human blockhead, human pincushion, and bed of nails. She calls her overall act "Odd Girl".

=== Other ===
Having earned a degree in sociology and health science, Schillaci has worked in factories, special education, child care, web development, and in administration. Her hobbies include writing and playing music.
