= Riley Jones (rugby league) =

Australian rugby league player

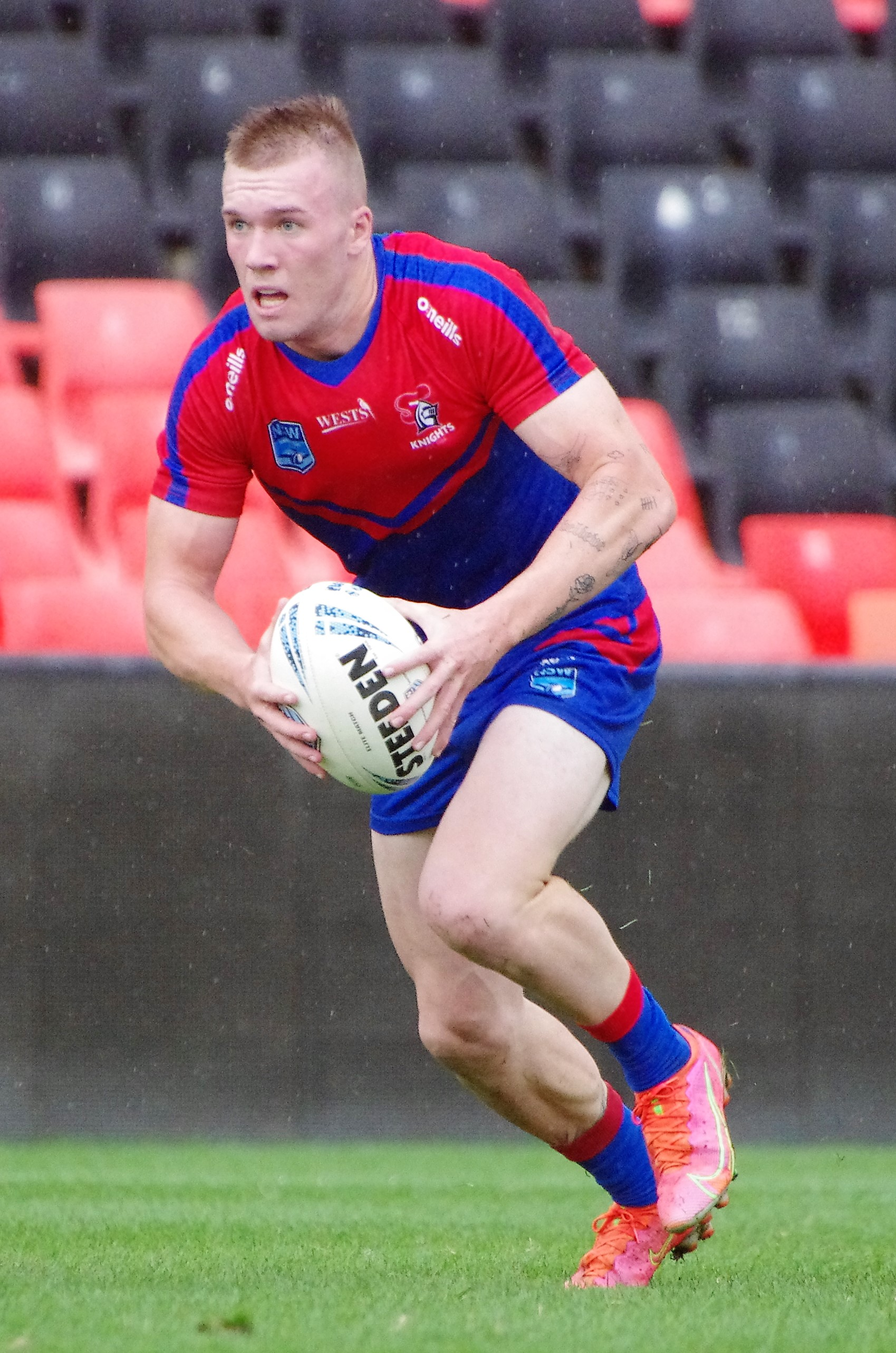

Personal information
- Born: 11 January 2002 (age 24) Gosford, New South Wales, Australia
- Height: 190 cm (6 ft 3 in)
- Weight: 92 kg (14 st 7 lb)

Playing information
- Position: Hooker, Centre
Club
| Years | Team | Pld | T | G | FG | P |
|---|---|---|---|---|---|---|
| 2023 | Newcastle Knights | 1 | 0 | 0 | 0 | 0 |
| 2026– | Cronulla Sharks | 2 | 1 | 0 | 0 | 4 |
| | Total | 3 | 1 | 0 | 0 | 4 |
- Source: As of 12 September 2026

Riley Jones (born 11 January 2002) is an Australian professional rugby league footballer who plays as a centre and hooker for the Cronulla Sharks in the National Rugby League.

== Background ==
Born in Gosford, New South Wales, Jones played his junior rugby league for The Entrance Tigers, before being signed by the Newcastle Knights.

== Playing career ==
=== Early years ===
Jones rose through the ranks for the Newcastle Knights, playing with their Harold Matthews Cup team in 2018, the S. G. Ball Cup side from 2019 to 2021 and finally the Jersey Flegg Cup team from 2022 to 2023.

=== 2023 ===
In round 27 of the 2023 NRL season, Jones made his NRL debut for the Knights against the St. George Illawarra Dragons.
