= 2024 Newcastle Knights season =

National Rugby League NSW season

- NRL Rank: 8th
- Play-off result: QEF
- 2024 record: Wins: 12; losses: 12
- Points scored: For: 470; against: 510

Team information
- CEO: Phil Gardner
- Coach: Adam O'Brien
- Captain: Kalyn Ponga
- Stadium: McDonald Jones Stadium
- Avg. attendance: 22,635
- High attendance: 29,433

Top scorers
- Tries: Fletcher Sharpe (11)
- Goals: Kalyn Ponga (46)
- Points: Kalyn Ponga (104)
← 2023	2025 →

The 2024 Newcastle Knights season was the 37th in the club's history. Coached by Adam O'Brien and captained by Kalyn Ponga, they competed in the NRL's 2024 Telstra Premiership, finishing the regular season in 8th place (out of 17), thus reaching the finals but were knocked out after losing to the North Queensland Cowboys in week 1.

== Squad ==
Newcastle Knights 2024 squad
2024 NRL top 30 squad			Development list	Coaching staff
235 Dane Gagai (vc) – CE (gk); 268 Daniel Saifiti – PR; 269 Jacob Saifiti – PR; 275 Jack Cogger – HB; 296 Kalyn Ponga (c) – FB (gk); 310 Phoenix Crossland – HK; 311 Bradman Best – CE; 313 Jayden Brailey (vc) – HK; 315 Enari Tuala – WG; 318 Brodie Jones – SR	321 Tyson Frizell (vc) – SR; 327 Mat Croker – PR; 331 Leo Thompson – PR; 333 Krystian Mapapalangi – CE; 335 Adam Elliott – LK; 336 Jackson Hastings – HB (gk); 337 Jack Hetherington – PR; 339 Tyson Gamble – FE; 340 Dylan Lucas – SR; 341 Ryan Rivett – FE (pre-season loss)	343 Greg Marzhew – WG; 345 Riley Jones – HK; 346 Kai Pearce-Paul – SR; 347 Jed Cartwright – SR (mid-season loss); 348 Thomas Jenkins – WG; 349 David Armstrong – FB; 350 Fletcher Sharpe – FB; 351 Will Pryce – FE (gk); Paul Bryan – PR; Myles Martin – LK	342 Tom Cant – LK; 353 Sebastian Su'a – PR; Zach Herring – HB; Laitia Moceidreke – WG; Fletcher Myers – CE (mid-season loss); Extended squad: 352 Kyle McCarthy – PR	Head coach: Adam O'Brien; Assistant coaches: Rory Kostjasyn; Brian McDermott; Ronald Griffiths - NSW Cup coach; Michael Dobson - Jersey Flegg Cup coach; Legend: (c) Captain(s); (vc) Vice-captain(s); Updated: 14 September 2024; Source(s): Newcastle Knights Profiles, Rugby League Project

== Transfers and re-signings ==
=== Gains ===
Player/Coach	Previous club	Length	Source
Jed Cartwright	South Sydney Rabbitohs	2025	
Jack Cogger	Penrith Panthers	2026	
Zach Herring	St. George Illawarra Dragons	2024	
Thomas Jenkins	Penrith Panthers	2025	
Fletcher Myers	Manly Warringah Sea Eagles	2024	
Kai Pearce-Paul	Wigan Warriors	2025	
Will Pryce	Huddersfield Giants	2025	

=== Losses ===
Player/Coach	Club	Source
Dane Aukafolau	Northern Pride RLFC	
Fa'amanu Brown	Hull F.C.	
Jed Cartwright	Hull F.C.	
Adam Clune	Huddersfield Giants	
Lachlan Fitzgibbon	Warrington Wolves	
Tony Gleeson (Jersey Flegg Cup coach)	Released	
Bailey Hodgson	Manly Warringah Sea Eagles	
Hymel Hunt	Released	
Jack Johns	Released	
Oryn Keeley	Dolphins	
David Klemmer	Wests Tigers	
Kurt Mann	Canterbury-Bankstown Bulldogs	
Lachie Miller	Leeds Rhinos	
Michael Monaghan (NSW Cup coach)	Gold Coast Titans	
Fletcher Myers	South Sydney Rabbitohs	
Chris Randall	Gold Coast Titans	
Ryan Rivett	Toulouse Olympique	
Kobe Rugless	Blacktown Workers	
Simi Sasagi	Canberra Raiders	
Ben Talty	North Sydney Bears	
Tevita Toloi	Released	
Chris Vea'ila	Cronulla-Sutherland Sharks	
Dom Young	Sydney Roosters	

=== Promoted juniors ===
Player	Junior side	Source
Paul Bryan	Jersey Flegg Cup	
Kyle McCarthy	S. G. Ball Cup	
Laitia Moceidreke	NSW Cup	
Fletcher Sharpe	Jersey Flegg Cup	
Sebastian Su'a	NSW Cup	

=== Re-signings ===
Player/Coach	Re-signed to	Source
Bradman Best	2027	
Tom Cant	2026	
Mat Croker	2025	
Dane Gagai	2026	
Tyson Gamble	2026	
Adam O'Brien (head coach)	2027	
Jacob Saifiti	2027	
Fletcher Sharpe	2026	

=== Change of role ===
Player/Coach	New role	Source
Michael Dobson (Head of Pathways)	Jersey Flegg Cup coach	
Ronald Griffiths (NRLW coach)	NSW Cup coach	

=== Player contract situations ===
2024 (left)	2025	2026	2027
David Armstrong	Jayden Brailey	Tom Cant	Bradman Best
Jed Cartwright	Paul Bryan	Jack Cogger	Kyle McCarthy
Zach Herring	Mat Croker	Phoenix Crossland	Kalyn Ponga
Thomas Jenkins	Adam Elliott	Tyson Frizell	Jacob Saifiti
Krystian Mapapalangi	Jackson Hastings	Dane Gagai	
Myles Martin	Jack Hetherington	Tyson Gamble	
Laitia Moceidreke	Brodie Jones	Greg Marzhew	
Fletcher Myers	Riley Jones	Fletcher Sharpe	
Ryan Rivett	Dylan Lucas		
Daniel Saifiti	Kai Pearce-Paul		
Enari Tuala	Will Pryce		
	Sebastian Su'a		
	Leo Thompson		

== Fixtures ==
=== Pre-season trials ===
Date	Opponent	Venue	Score	Tries	Conversions	Attendance
Saturday, 17 February	Cronulla-Sutherland Sharks	Industree Group Stadium	44–18	D.Armstrong (2), D.Lucas (2), K.McCarthy, R.Jones, J.Cogger, W.Pryce	J.Cogger (3/3), W.Pryce (2/4), T.Gamble (1/1)	7,952
Saturday, 24 February	Melbourne Storm	Churchill Park	10-28	E.Tuala, B.Best	K.Ponga (1/2)	5,218
Legend: Win Loss Draw

=== Ladder ===
Pos	Team	Pld	W	D	L	B	PF	PA	PD	Pts	Qualification
1	Melbourne Storm	24	19	0	5	3	692	449	+243	44	Advance to finals series
2	Penrith Panthers (P)	24	17	0	7	3	580	394	+186	40	Advance to finals series
3	Sydney Roosters	24	16	0	8	3	738	463	+275	38	Advance to finals series
4	Cronulla-Sutherland Sharks	24	16	0	8	3	653	431	+222	38	Advance to finals series
5	North Queensland Cowboys	24	15	0	9	3	657	568	+89	36	Advance to finals series
6	Canterbury-Bankstown Bulldogs	24	14	0	10	3	529	433	+96	34	Advance to finals series
7	Manly Warringah Sea Eagles	24	13	1	10	3	634	521	+113	33	Advance to finals series
8	Newcastle Knights	24	12	0	12	3	470	510	−40	30	Advance to finals series
9	Canberra Raiders	24	12	0	12	3	474	601	−127	30	
10	Dolphins	24	11	0	13	3	577	578	−1	28	
11	St. George Illawarra Dragons	24	11	0	13	3	508	634	−126	28	
12	Brisbane Broncos	24	10	0	14	3	537	607	−70	26	
13	New Zealand Warriors	24	9	1	14	3	512	574	−62	25	
14	Gold Coast Titans	24	8	0	16	3	488	656	−168	22	
15	Parramatta Eels	24	7	0	17	3	561	716	−155	20	
16	South Sydney Rabbitohs	24	7	0	17	3	494	682	−188	20	
17	Wests Tigers	24	6	0	18	3	463	750	−287	18	

Source: National Rugby League
(P) Premiers

=== Result by round ===
Round	1	2	3	4	5	6	7	8	9	10	11	12	13	14	15	16	17	18	19	20	21	22	23	24	25	26	27
Ground	H	A	H	A	H	H	A	A	H	A	N	–	H	A	H	–	H	A	A	H	–	A	H	A	A	H	H
Result	L	L	W	L	W	L	L	W	W	W	W	B	L	L	L	B	W	W	L	L	B	L	W	L	W	W	W
Position	14	15	13	15	12	14	15	13	11	10	8	7	11	13	13	12	11	9	10	13	11	12	10	11	11	9	8
Points	0	0	2	2	4	4	4	6	8	10	12	14	14	14	14	16	18	20	20	20	22	22	24	24	26	28	30

Source: National Rugby League
A = Away; H = Home; N = Neutral; B = Bye; W = Win; D = Draw; L = Loss

=== Matches ===
The league fixtures were announced on 13 November 2023.

Win Draw Loss Fixtures

Round 1: 7 March 2024	Newcastle Knights	12–28	Canberra Raiders	Newcastle
20:00 AEDT	Tries: Frizell 30'; Hastings 76'; Goals: Ponga 2/2 32', 76'	[Report Report]	Tries: Hosking 25'; Levi 47'; Savage 63'; Rapana 69'; Young 79'; Goals: Fogarty 4/6 15 pen', 26', 48', 79'; Sin bin: Young (yellow card) 24' to 34'	Stadium: McDonald Jones Stadium; Attendance: 22,378; Referee: Todd Smith

Round 2: 16 March 2024	North Queensland Cowboys	21–20 (g.p.)	Newcastle Knights	Townsville
17:30 AEST	Tries: Townsend 41'; Feldt 44'; Dearden 60'; Nanai 76'; Goals: Holmes 2/4 43', 61'; Field goals: Townsend 81'	[Report Report]	Tries: Elliott 18', 36'; Marzhew 48'; Goals: Ponga 4/4 19', 37', 49', 53 pen'	Stadium: Queensland Country Bank Stadium; Attendance: 18,986; Referee: Adam Gee

Round 3: 24 March 2024	Newcastle Knights	14–12	Melbourne Storm	Newcastle
18:15 AEDT	Tries: Gagai 23'; Tuala 28'; Goals: Ponga 3/3 25', 29', 37 pen'	[Report Report]	Tries: Papenhuyzen 48'; Wishart 75'; Goals: Meaney 2/2 50', 75'	Stadium: McDonald Jones Stadium; Attendance: 21,889; Referee: Grant Atkins

Round 4: 31 March 2024	New Zealand Warriors	20–12	Newcastle Knights	Auckland
18:05 NZDT	Tries: Ford 15'; Harris-Tavita 18'; Montoya 43'; Goals: Johnson 4/4 17', 19', 44', 71 pen'	[Report Report]	Tries: Frizell 35'; Best 73'; Goals: Ponga 2/2 36', 74'	Stadium: Go Media Stadium; Attendance: 24,112; Referee: Peter Gough

Round 5: 5 April 2024	Newcastle Knights	30–10	St. George Illawarra Dragons	Newcastle
20:00 AEDT	Tries: Hastings 4'; Tuala 24'; D. Saifiti 29'; Lucas 34'; Ponga 73'; Goals: Ponga 5/5 5', 26', 30', 36', 74'	[Report Report]	Tries: Lomax 13'; Hunt 21'; Goals: Lomax 1/2 22'	Stadium: McDonald Jones Stadium; Attendance: 9,448; Referee: Belinda Sharpe

Round 6: 11 April 2024	Newcastle Knights	20–22	Sydney Roosters	Newcastle
19:50 AEST	Tries: Hastings 5'; Best 37'; Elliott 76'; Goals: Ponga 4/4 6', 13 pen', 38', 76'	[Report Report]	Tries: Tupou 16', 64'; Radley 22'; Br. Smith 31'; Goals: Sua'ali'i 3/4 24', 33', 65'	Stadium: McDonald Jones Stadium; Attendance: 21,940; Referee: Gerard Sutton

Round 7: 21 April 2024	Canterbury-Bankstown Bulldogs	36–12	Newcastle Knights	Sydney Olympic Park
14:00 AEST	Tries: Hughes 4'; Kiraz 21'; Xerri 34'; Hayward 48'; Addo-Carr 58'; Crichton 71'; Goals: Burton 6/6 6', 23', 35', 50', 59', 73'; Sin bin: Mahoney (yellow card) 76' to 80'	[Report Report]	Tries: Lucas 30'; Best 79'; Goals: Ponga 1/1 32'; Hastings 1/1 79'; Sin bin: Hetherington (yellow card) 76' to 80'	Stadium: Accor Stadium; Attendance: 17,784; Referee: Peter Gough

Round 8: 28 April 2024	Dolphins	14–18	Newcastle Knights	Brisbane
14:00 AEST	Tries: Keeley 25'; Isaako 77'; Averillo 78'; Goals: Isaako 1/3 26'	[Report Report]	Tries: Armstrong 8'; Gagai 17'; Gamble 47'; Goals: Gagai 3/4 18', 49', 66 pen'	Stadium: Suncorp Stadium; Attendance: 18,033; Referee: Liam Kennedy

Round 9: 5 May 2024	Newcastle Knights	14–8	New Zealand Warriors	Newcastle
14:00 AEST	Tries: Gamble 10'; Saifiti 62'; Goals: Gagai 3/3 11', 15 pen', 64'	[Report Report]	Tries: Walker 26'; Goals: Johnson 2/2 28', 53 pen'	Stadium: McDonald Jones Stadium; Attendance: 16,094; Referee: Chris Butler

Round 10: 11 May 2024	Wests Tigers	14–20	Newcastle Knights	Tamworth
15:00 AEST	Tries: Papali'i 15', 52'; Naden 78'; Goals: Sullivan 1/3 16'; Sin bin: Bula (yellow card) 25' to 35'	[Report Report]	Tries: Marzhew 27'; Tuala 39'; Armstrong 43'; Best 63'; Goals: Gagai 2/5 44', 65'; Sin bin: Saifiti (yellow card) 73' to 80'	Stadium: Scully Park; Attendance: 10,107; Referee: Ziggy Przeklasa-Adamski

Round 11: 18 May 2024	Gold Coast Titans	24–28	Newcastle Knights	Brisbane
15:00 AEST	Tries: Haas 14'; Khan-Pereira 18', 36'; S. Fifita 24'; Kini 34'; Goals: Schoupp 1/3 19'; Kelly 1/2 35'; Sin bin: Schoupp (yellow card) 30' to 40'	[Report Report]	Tries: Armstrong 4', 8', 46'; Jones 50'; J. Saifiti 67'; Goals: Hastings 4/5 5', 48', 52', 68'	Stadium: Suncorp Stadium; Attendance: 38,154; Referee: Gerard Sutton

Round 12 (Bye for Newcastle Knights)

Round 13: 31 May 2024	Newcastle Knights	2–32	Canterbury-Bankstown Bulldogs	Newcastle
20:00 AEST	Goals: Hastings 1/1 6 pen' Sin bin: J. Saifiti (yellow card) 78' to 80'	[Report Report]	Tries: Addo-Carr 14', 27'; Preston 47', 67'; Curran 61'; Xerri 73'; Goals: Sexton 4/6 16', 68', 74', 79 pen' Hayward 0/1; Sin bin: Tracey (yellow card) 6' to 16'; Sexton (yellow card) 53' to 63'	Stadium: McDonald Jones Stadium; Attendance: 21,204; Referee: Grant Atkins

Round 14: 9 June 2024	Melbourne Storm	36–28	Newcastle Knights	Melbourne
14:00 AEST	Tries: Meaney 16', 39'; Hughes 38'; Wishart 47', 59'; Coates 54'; Goals: Meaney 6/7 18', 39', 40', 48', 61', 80 pen'	[Report Report]	Tries: Lucas 20', 41'; Sharpe 30'; Gagai 65'; Tuala 75'; Goals: Hastings 4/5 22', 31', 66', 76'; Sin bin: Frizell (yellow card) 79' to 80'	Stadium: AAMI Park; Attendance: 20,269; Referee: Adam Gee

Round 15: 16 June 2024	Newcastle Knights	18–26	Penrith Panthers	Newcastle
16:05 AEST	Tries: Sharpe 3'; Lucas 52'; Best 57'; Goals: Hastings 3/3 5', 53', 59'	[Report Report]	Tries: Sorensen 13'; To'o 18'; Luai 32'; Smith 38'; Edwards 64'; Goals: Alamoti 3/5 14', 39', 66'	Stadium: McDonald Jones Stadium; Attendance: 27,966; Referee: Grant Atkins

Round 16 (Bye for Newcastle Knights)

Round 17: 29 June 2024	Newcastle Knights	34–26	Parramatta Eels	Newcastle
17:30 AEST	Tries: Pryce 22'; Marzhew 36', 45'; Tuala 64'; Best 72', 78'; Goals: Hastings 5/6 24', 46', 66', 74', 79'	[Report Report]	Tries: Talagi 12', 51'; Moses 25', 60'; Paulo 75'; Goals: Moses 3/5 13', 26', 75'	Stadium: McDonald Jones Stadium; Attendance: 27,424; Referee: Peter Gough

Round 18: 7 July 2024	Canberra Raiders	12–16	Newcastle Knights	Canberra
16:05 AEST	Tries: Papali'i 6'; Weekes 53'; Goals: Rapana 2/3 7', 55'	[Report Report]	Tries: Gagai 9', 43'; Marzhew 17'; Goals: Hastings 1/2 11'; Pryce 1/1 44'	Stadium: GIO Stadium; Attendance: 12,553; Referee: Gerard Sutton

Round 19: 14 July 2024	Manly Warringah Sea Eagles	44–6	Newcastle Knights	Brookvale
16:05 AEST	Tries: Humphreys 5'; T. Trbojevic 16'; Saab 21'; Talau 34'; Garrick 42'; Hopoate 58', 77'; Olakau'atu 66'; Goals: Garrick 3/5 6', 17', 44'; Humphreys 3/3 59', 68', 78'	[Report Report]	Tries: Frizell 72'; Goals: Pryce 1/1 73'	Stadium: 4 Pines Park; Attendance: 17,298; Referee: Grant Atkins

Round 20: 20 July 2024	Newcastle Knights	14–30	Brisbane Broncos	Newcastle
17:30 AEST	Tries: Hetherington 54'; Croker 66'; Marzhew 74'; Goals: Hastings 0/1; Ponga 1/2 67'	[Report Report]	Tries: Mariner 23', 37'; Walsh 29'; Piakura 48'; Mam 64'; Goals: Reynolds 5/5 24', 30', 39', 51', 64'	Stadium: McDonald Jones Stadium; Attendance: 26,952; Referee: Chris Butler

Round 21 (Bye for Newcastle Knights)

Round 22: 4 August 2024	Penrith Panthers	22–14	Newcastle Knights	Penrith
14:00 AEST	Tries: C. McLean 9'; Tago 25'; Cleary 69'; Goals: Cleary 5/5 11', 26', 39 pen', 71', 79 pen'	[Report Report]	Tries: D. Saifiti 6'; Frizell 56'; Goals: Ponga 3/3 8', 57', 65 pen'	Stadium: BlueBet Stadium; Attendance: 20,261; Referee: Adam Gee

Round 23: 11 August 2024	Newcastle Knights	34–18	Wests Tigers	Newcastle
16:05 AEST	Tries: Frizell 12'; Sharpe 20', 30', 39', 55'; Mapapalangi 44'; Goals: Ponga 5/6 13', 21', 39', 45', 57'	[Report Report]	Tries: Doueihi 16'; Faataape 26'; Bula 47'; Goals: Sezer 3/3 17', 28', 48'	Stadium: McDonald Jones Stadium; Attendance: 22,183; Referee: Belinda Sharpe

Round 24: 18 August 2024	Cronulla-Sutherland Sharks	19–18 (g.p.)	Newcastle Knights	Cronulla
16:05 AEST	Tries: Atkinson 2'; Nikora 7'; Mulitalo 72'; Goals: Atkinson 3/5 4', 63 pen', 74'; Field goals: Atkinson 84'	[Report Report]	Tries: Pearce-Paul 20'; Marzhew 30'; Gagai 49'; Goals: Ponga 3/4 21', 31', 45 pen' Sin bin: Crossland (yellow card) 40' to 50'	Stadium: PointsBet Stadium; Attendance: 11,503; Referee: Gerard Sutton

Round 25: 24 August 2024	South Sydney Rabbitohs	16–36	Newcastle Knights	Sydney Olympic Park
19:35 AEST	Tries: Milne 16'; Wighton 19'; Duncan 69'; Goals: Myers 2/3 18', 20'; Sin bin: Murray (yellow card) 37' to 47'	[Report Report]	Tries: Sharpe 11'; Lucas 31'; Gagai 34', 76'; Cogger 52', 58'; Goals: Ponga 6/7 12', 33', 35', 37 pen', 53', 60'; Sin bin: Su'a (yellow card) 71' to 80'	Stadium: Accor Stadium; Attendance: 9,659; Referee: Chris Butler

Round 26: 1 September 2024	Newcastle Knights	36–14	Gold Coast Titans	Newcastle
14:00 AEST	Tries: Ponga 20', 37'; Sharpe 42', 46', 50'; Crossland 55'; Thompson 78'; Goals: Ponga 4/7 22', 38', 57', 79'	[Report Report]	Tries: S. Fifita 6', 59'; De Groot 69'; Goals: Campbell 1/3 70'	Stadium: McDonald Jones Stadium; Attendance: 24,712; Referee: Gerard Sutton

Round 27: 8 September 2024	Newcastle Knights	14–6	Dolphins	Newcastle
16:05 AEST	Tries: Elliott 27'; Jones 44'; Goals: Ponga 3/3 29', 46', 53 pen'	[Report Report]	Tries: Tabuai-Fidow 70'; Goals: Isaako 1/1 71'; Sin bin: J. Bromwich (yellow card) 67' to 77'	Stadium: McDonald Jones Stadium; Attendance: 29,433; Referee: Ashley Klein

== Finals series ==
=== Matches ===
Win Draw Loss Fixtures

QEF: 14 September 2024	North Queensland Cowboys	28–16	Newcastle Knights	Townsville
19:50 AEST	Tries: Feldt 13'; Taulagi 44'; McLean 51'; Cotter 72'; Dearden 78'; Goals: Holmes 4/5 45', 52', 73', 79'	[Report Report]	Tries: Brailey 21'; Sharpe 32'; Lucas 63'; Goals: Ponga 2/3 23', 33'; Sin bin: Thompson (yellow card) 77' to 80'	Stadium: Queensland Country Bank Stadium; Attendance: 24,861; Referee: Todd Smith

== Statistics ==
Name	Appearances	Tries	Goals	Field goals	Points	Captain	Age
David Armstrong	5	5	0	0	20	0	23
Bradman Best	17	7	0	0	28	0	23
Jayden Brailey	23	1	0	0	4	8	28
Tom Cant	3	0	0	0	0	0	22
Jed Cartwright	3	0	0	0	0	0	28
Jack Cogger	17	2	0	0	8	0	27
Mat Croker	16	1	0	0	4	0	25
Phoenix Crossland	24	1	0	0	4	0	24
Adam Elliott	23	4	0	0	16	0	30
Tyson Frizell	19	5	0	0	20	13	33
Dane Gagai	22	8	10	0	52	4	33
Tyson Gamble	14	2	0	0	8	0	28
Jackson Hastings	16	3	19	0	50	0	28
Jack Hetherington	20	1	0	0	4	0	28
Thomas Jenkins	5	0	0	0	0	0	23
Brodie Jones	18	2	0	0	8	0	26
Dylan Lucas	21	7	0	0	28	0	24
Krystian Mapapalangi	4	1	0	0	4	0	22
Greg Marzhew	22	7	0	0	28	0	27
Kyle McCarthy	1	0	0	0	0	0	20
Kai Pearce-Paul	22	1	0	0	4	0	23
Kalyn Ponga	16	3	46	0	104	16	26
Will Pryce	5	1	2	0	8	0	22
Daniel Saifiti	23	3	0	0	12	0	28
Jacob Saifiti	16	1	0	0	4	0	28
Fletcher Sharpe	12	11	0	0	44	0	20
Sebastian Su'a	1	0	0	0	0	0	21
Leo Thompson	23	1	0	0	4	0	24
Enari Tuala	15	5	0	0	20	0	26
Totals	25	83	76	0	486	–	Average: 25

29 players used.

== Milestones ==
- Round 1: Kai Pearce-Paul made his NRL debut for the club, after previously playing for the Wigan Warriors.
- Round 2: Jed Cartwright made his debut for the club, after previously playing for the South Sydney Rabbitohs.
- Round 2: Adam Elliott scored his first try for the club.
- Round 2: Thomas Jenkins made his debut for the club, after previously playing for the Penrith Panthers.
- Round 6: Greg Marzhew played his 50th career game.
- Round 8: David Armstrong made his NRL debut for the club and scored his first career try.
- Round 8: Jacob Saifiti played his 150th career game.
- Round 10: Leo Thompson played his 50th career game.
- Round 11: Enari Tuala played his 100th career game.
- Round 14: Jayden Brailey played his 50th game for the club.
- Round 14: Fletcher Sharpe made his NRL debut for the club and scored his first career try.
- Round 17: Will Pryce made his NRL debut for the club, after previously playing for the Huddersfield Giants, scoring a try.
- Round 18: Tyson Frizell played his 250th career game.
- Round 18: Will Pryce kicked his first goal for the club.
- Round 19: Mat Croker played his 50th career game.
- Round 19: Jackson Hastings played his 100th career game.
- Round 23: Krystian Mapapalangi scored his first career try.
- Round 24: Kyle McCarthy made his NRL debut for the club.
- Round 24: Kai Pearce-Paul scored his first try for the club.
- Round 25: Sebastian Su'a made his NRL debut for the club.

== NRL Women's team ==
2024 Newcastle Knights season
- NRLW Rank: 3rd
- 2024 record: Wins: 6; losses: 3
- Points scored: For: 238; against: 132

Team information
- CEO: Phil Gardner
- Coach: Ben Jeffries
- Captain: Hannah Southwell
- Stadium: McDonald Jones Stadium
- Avg. attendance: 6,700
- High attendance: 9,479

Top scorers
- Tries: Sheridan Gallagher (9)
- Goals: Jesse Southwell (22)
- Points: Jesse Southwell (44)
← 2023	2025 →

The 2024 Newcastle Knights Women's season was the 4th in the club's history. Coached by Ben Jeffries and captained by Hannah Southwell, they competed in the NRLW's 2024 NRL Women's Premiership, finishing the regular season in 3rd place (out of 10), thus reaching the finals but were knocked out after losing to the Sydney Roosters in the Grand Final qualifier.

Newcastle Knights women's – 2024 squad
2024 NRLW top 24 squad			Development list	Coaching staff
4 Caitlan Johnston-Green – SR, PR; 26 Yasmin Clydsdale – SR; 27 Olivia Higgins – HK; 28 Shanice Parker – CE; 29 Hannah Southwell (c) – LK; 30 Jesse Southwell – HB; 32 Tamika Upton – FB; 33 Tayla Predebon – PR; 34 Simone Karpani – PR	41 Kayla Romaniuk – LK; 42 Laishon Albert-Jones – LK, SR; 43 Rima Butler – PR; 44 Sheridan Gallagher – WG; 45 Abigail Roache – CE; 47 Nita Maynard – HK; 48 Viena Tinao – PR; 49 Georgia Roche – FE; 51 Jacinta Carter – PR	52 Grace Kukutai – LK; 53 Isabella Waterman – FB; 55 Tenika Willison – WG (mid-season signing); 56 Evie Jones – FE; Jayde Herdegen – FE; Jules Kirkpatrick – LK; Tamerah Leati – WG (mid-season loss)	54 Lilly-Ann White – FB; 57 Evah McEwen – SR; Leilani Ahsam – HB; Fane Finau – SR; Leah Ollerton – HK	Head coach: Ben Jeffries; Legend: (c) Captain(s); (vc) Vice-captain(s); Updated: 30 September 2024; Source(s): Newcastle Knights Profiles, Rugby League Project

=== Player gains and losses ===
Player gains
Player/Coach	Previous club	Length	Source
Leilani Ahsam	Tweed Heads Seagulls	2025	
Ben Jeffries (head coach)	North Queensland Cowboys	2026	
Grace Kukutai	Chiefs Manawa	2025	
Isabella Waterman	Hurricanes Poua	2025	
Tenika Willison	New Zealand Black Ferns Sevens	2025	

Losses
Player/Coach	Club	Source
Tiana Davison	Sydney Roosters	
Ronald Griffiths (head coach)	Knights NSW Cup coach	
Felila Kia	Released	
Tamerah Leati	Released	
Tazmyne Luschwitz	Released	
Caitlin Moran	Illawarra Steelers	
Jasmin Strange	Sydney Roosters	
Tylah Vallance	Released	

Promoted juniors
Player	Junior side	Source
Evah McEwen	Knights Tarsha Gale Cup	
Leah Ollerton	Knights Tarsha Gale Cup	
Lilly-Ann White	Knights Tarsha Gale Cup	

Player re-signings
Player/Coach	Re-signed to	Source
Jacinta Carter	2027	
Fane Finau	2026	
Sheridan Gallagher	2025	
Olivia Higgins	2026	
Simone Karpani	2026	
Nita Maynard	2024	
Viena Tinao	2025	

==== Player contract situations ====
2024 (left)	2025	2026	2027
Laishon Albert-Jones	Leilani Ahsam	Fane Finau	Evie Jones
Rima Butler	Yasmin Clydsdale	Olivia Higgins	Evah McEwen
Jacinta Carter	Sheridan Gallagher	Simone Karpani	Georgia Roche
Jayde Herdegen	Grace Kukutai	Jules Kirkpatrick	Hannah Southwell
Caitlan Johnston-Green	Leah Ollerton	Tayla Predebon	Jesse Southwell
Tamerah Leati	Shanice Parker	Kayla Romaniuk	
Nita Maynard	Viena Tinao		
Abigail Roache	Isabella Waterman		
Tamika Upton	Lilly-Ann White		
	Tenika Willison		

=== Women's statistics ===
Name	Appearances	Tries	Goals	Field goals	Points	Captain	Age
Laishon Albert-Jones	10	3	0	0	12	0	27
Rima Butler	8	1	0	0	4	0	27
Jacinta Carter	1	0	0	0	0	0	20
Yasmin Clydsdale	10	3	0	0	12	0	30
Sheridan Gallagher	8	9	3	0	42	0	22
Olivia Higgins	10	4	0	0	16	0	32
Caitlan Johnston-Green	2	1	0	0	4	0	23
Evie Jones	4	2	0	0	8	0	19
Simone Karpani	7	0	0	0	0	0	27
Grace Kukutai	3	0	0	0	0	0	27
Nita Maynard	8	0	0	0	0	0	32
Evah McEwen	2	1	0	0	4	0	18
Shanice Parker	10	2	0	0	8	0	26
Tayla Predebon	9	1	0	0	4	0	24
Abigail Roache	9	3	0	0	12	0	24
Georgia Roche	10	2	4	0	16	0	24
Kayla Romaniuk	10	1	0	0	4	0	22
Hannah Southwell	10	2	0	0	8	10	25
Jesse Southwell	9	0	22	0	44	0	19
Viena Tinao	6	0	0	0	0	0	22
Tamika Upton	10	7	0	0	28	0	27
Isabella Waterman	2	0	0	0	0	0	24
Lilly-Ann White	5	3	0	0	12	0	19
Tenika Willison	7	4	0	0	16	0	27
Totals	10	49	29	0	254	–	Average: 24

24 players used.

== Representative honours ==
The following players appeared in a representative match or were named in a representative squad in 2024.

Australia

- Bradman Best (squad member)

Australia (Women's)

- Yasmin Clydsdale
- Olivia Higgins
- Jesse Southwell (squad member)
- Tamika Upton

Indigenous All Stars

- Adam Elliott
- Ronald Griffiths (coach)

Indigenous All Stars (Women's)

- Tamika Upton

Māori All Stars

- Dane Gagai
- Leo Thompson

Māori All Stars (Women's)

- Rima Butler
- Shanice Parker

New South Wales

- Bradman Best

New South Wales (Women's)

- Yasmin Clydsdale
- Olivia Higgins
- Caitlan Johnston-Green

New Zealand

- Phoenix Crossland
- Leo Thompson

New Zealand (Women's)

- Laishon Albert-Jones (extended squad)
- Shanice Parker
- Abigail Roache

Prime Minister's XIII

- Dylan Lucas
- Fletcher Sharpe

Prime Minister's XIII (Women's)

- Jesse Southwell

Queensland

- Dane Gagai
- Kalyn Ponga

Queensland (Women's)

- Tamika Upton

Samoa (Women's)

- Simone Karpani
- Evah McEwen
