= List of people from Wollongong =

The following is a list of people from Wollongong, New South Wales, Australia, as well as its surrounding suburbs:

== Politics ==
- Sally Bowen women's rights activist, unionist and member of the Communist Party of Australia
- Rex Connor, Minister for Minerals and Energy in the Whitlam government
- Bryan Green, member of the Tasmanian House of Assembly
- Dr. Stephen Martin, former speaker of the Australian House of Representatives
- Chris Rath, New South Wales Liberal Party member of the New South Wales Legislative Council
- Rev. Gordon Bradbery AM Lord Mayor of Wollongong

== Arts and media ==
- Natalie Bassingthwaighte, actress and singer, lead vocalist of Rogue Traders
- Michael Cusack, animator and voice actor, Smiling Friends and Koala Man
- Adam Demos, actor, Sex/Life
- DPR Ian, singer-songwriter
- Frenchy, comedian and podcaster
- Nikki Gemmell, author
- Ricardo Gonçalves, television journalist and presenter
- Steven Jacobs, actor and television presenter
- John Jarratt, actor, Wolf Creek
- Catriona Rowntree, television presenter
- The Sunday Painters, 1980s avant-pop group
- Nic Testoni, actor, Home and Away
- Esme Timbery, artist and shellworker
- Richard Tognetti, violinist, current artistic director of the Australian Chamber Orchestra
- Anthony Warlow, opera and musical theater star
- Con Mourmourakis, Reality TV Star, Aussie Shore

== Sports ==
- Bill Beach, world champion sculler (rowing) 1884–87
- Nicole Beck, rugby sevens, current Australian player and Olympic gold medalist, Rio 2016
- Michael Bolt, rugby league player
- Shaun Boyle, Winter Olympic athlete in skeleton
- Greg Carberry, rugby league player
- Scott Chipperfield, retired football (soccer) player who played for the Australia men's national soccer team
- Allan Fitzgibbon, former professional rugby league footballer and coach
- Craig Fitzgibbon, rugby league player and coach, coach of the Cronulla Sharks
- Tyson Frizell, professional rugby league player currently playing for the Newcastle Knights in the NRL
- Wayne Gardner, 500cc motorcycle racing world champion
- Jackson Hastings, professional rugby league player who has played for Wigan Warriors and Salford Red Devils in the Super League
- Brian Hetherington, rugby league player
- Ben Hornby, rugby league player who captained the St George Illawarra Dragons
- Matt Horsley, former football (soccer) player
- Bruno Hortelano, Spanish runner, gold medalist
- Dan Hunt, rugby league player
- Erin Hunter, soccer player
- Phil Jaques, cricketer
- Trent Johnston, Irish cricketer
- Brett Lee, Test cricketer
- Shane Lee, former One-Day International cricketer
- Nathan McAndrew, cricketer
- Kerryn McCann, marathon runner, Commonwealth games gold medalist
- Emma McKeon, swimmer, five-time Olympic and eight-time Commonwealth gold medalist
- Dean Mercer, iron man
- Trent Merrin, rugby league player
- Reagan Ogle, football (soccer) player who plays professionally in England
- Jason Ryles, rugby league player and coach
- Noel Spencer, football (soccer) player formerly of Sydney FC
- Mile Sterjovski, retired football (soccer) player who played in France, Switzerland and England; as well as for the Socceroos
- Brett Stewart, rugby league player
- Glenn Stewart, rugby league player
- Shannan Taylor, professional boxer
- Jacob Timpano, football (soccer) player who played for Sydney FC and managed Wollongong Wolves
- Emma Tonegato, rugby sevens, current Australian player and Olympic gold medallist, Rio 2016
- Alexander Volkanovski, mixed martial artist and two time UFC Featherweight Champion
- Luke Wilkshire, former football (soccer) player, commentator

== Other ==
- Bev Lawson, police officer and deputy commissioner of the New South Wales Police Force
- John Tasioulas, professor of Ethics and Legal Philosophy, University of Oxford and first Greek-Australian Rhodes Scholar
- Hal Waldron, prospector and gold diviner
