= Mat Croker =

Australian rugby league player (born 1999)

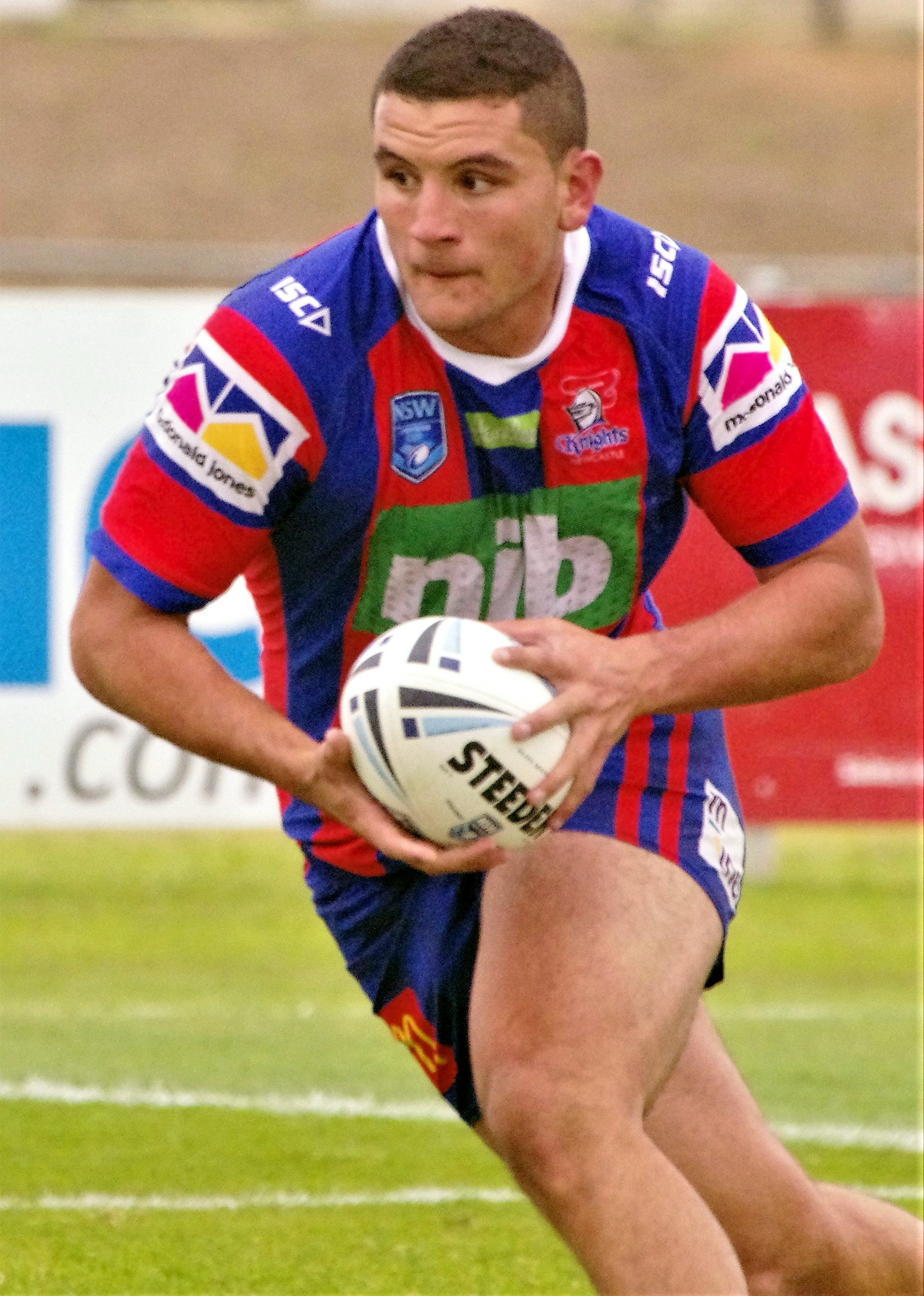

Personal information
- Full name: Mathew Croker
- Born: 11 September 1999 (age 27) Nabiac, New South Wales, Australia
- Height: 191 cm (6 ft 3 in)
- Weight: 108 kg (17 st 0 lb)

Playing information
- Position: Prop, Lock
Club
| Years | Team | Pld | T | G | FG | P |
|---|---|---|---|---|---|---|
| 2021– | Newcastle Knights | 110 | 8 | 0 | 0 | 32 |
- Source: As of 4 October 2026

Mathew Croker (born 11 September 1999) is an Australian professional rugby league footballer who plays as a prop and lock for the Newcastle Knights in the NRL.

== Background ==
Croker was born in Nabiac, New South Wales, Australia. He is of Chilean descent.

He played his junior rugby league for Taree City Bulls and Taree Panthers, before being signed by the Newcastle Knights.

== Playing career ==
=== Early years ===
Croker rose through the ranks for the Newcastle Knights, playing with their Harold Matthews Cup team in 2015, the S. G. Ball Cup side from 2016 to 2017, captaining the side in the latter year, and finally the under-20s side from 2017 to 2019. During those years, he also played for the New South Wales under-16s and under-20s teams. In November 2017, he re-signed with the Knights on a 3-year contract until the end of 2020. In 2020, he joined the Knights' NRL squad as one of their 6 allocated development players, as he graduated to the Canterbury Cup NSW team.

=== 2021 ===
In 2021, Croker started the year without a contract but played with Newcastle's NSW Cup squad as captain of the side. Ahead of round 13 of the 2021 NRL season, Croker signed an NRL contract with the Newcastle Knights after they lost three forwards from the last round in Tyson Frizell (injury), David Klemmer (suspension) and Daniel Saifiti (State of Origin selection). This allowed Croker to make his NRL debut for the Newcastle club against the Parramatta Eels which ended in a 40-4 defeat.

=== 2023 ===
Croker played a total of 24 games for Newcastle in the 2023 NRL season as the club finished 5th on the table. Croker played in both finals games as Newcastle were eliminated in the second week of the finals by the New Zealand Warriors.

=== 2024 ===
Croker played 17 games for Newcastle in the 2024 NRL season as the club finished 8th and qualified for the finals. They were eliminated in the first week of the finals by North Queensland. On 2 October, Croker re-signed with the club on a one year deal.

=== 2025 ===
On 12 May, the Newcastle outfit announced Croker had re-signed with the club for a further two years. Croker played 24 games for Newcastle in the 2025 NRL season which saw the club finish last on the table and claim the Wooden Spoon.

=== 2026 ===
Croker played 28 matches for Newcastle in the 2026 NRL season including their 2026 NRL Grand Final loss to the Sydney Roosters.

== Statistics ==
| Year | Team | Games | Tries | Pts |
|---|---|---|---|---|
| 2021 | Newcastle Knights | 2 | | |
| 2022 | Newcastle Knights | 16 | 1 | 4 |
| 2023 | Newcastle Knights | 24 | 3 | 12 |
| 2024 | Newcastle Knights | 17 | 1 | 4 |
| 2025 | Newcastle Knights | 24 | 2 | 8 |
| 2026 | Newcastle Knights | 19 | 1 | 4 |
| | Totals | 101 | 8 | 32 |

== Personal life ==
Croker is currently the lead host and face of the 257 Collective podcast with fellow NRL players Kalyn Ponga and Connor Watson.
