= Mary Puckey =

Australian medical doctor and hospital administrator

- Born: Mary Grace Courtenay Puckey; 17 February 1898; Wollongong, Australia
- Died: 25 March 1990 (aged 92); Wentworth Falls, New South Wales
- Education: MBBS, The Women's College, 1923; Diploma in Public Health, The Women's College, 1925
- Occupation(s): Medical doctor, hospital administrator

Mary Grace Courtenay Puckey MBE, (17 February 1898 – 25 March 1990) was an Australian medical doctor and hospital administrator. As general superintendent of the Rachel Forster Hospital in Sydney for 22 years, she was the first woman to serve as superintendent of an Australian hospital.

== Early life and education ==
Mary Puckey was born in Wollongong in 1898 to Courtenay Puckey, an English-born pharmacist, and Grace (née Spence). They lived in Fairy Meadow, where Mary attended Wollongong High School. She then enrolled at the University of Sydney, residing in The Women's College. She completed an MBBS in 1923 and a Diploma in Public Health in 1925.

== Career ==
In 1925, Puckey moved to South Australia and began working for the state Department of Education as a medical inspector of schools. She remained in that role until 1937, when she was appointed to the Metropolitan Infectious Diseases Hospital in Northfield as a bacteriologist. She returned to Sydney in 1941 as the general superintendent of the Rachel Forster Hospital; this made her the first woman appointed to such a position in an Australian hospital. She held the post until her retirement in 1962. Under her leadership, the hospital had expanded from a 12-bed facility in the Sydney central business district to a 120-bed hospital in Redfern. She established a library for medical records at the hospital and co-founded the New South Wales Association of Medical Records Librarians in 1949, serving as its first president. Puckey also served on the council of the Australian Institute of Hospital Administrators and the councils of the New South Wales branches of the British Medical Association and the Australian Medical Association. She was awarded an MBE in 1963.

== Retirement ==
After retiring in 1962, Puckey moved from Sydney to the Blue Mountains, settling in Blackheath with her sister Selina, who was also a doctor. She died in Wentworth Falls in 1990.
