= Sebastian Su'a =

Australian rugby league player

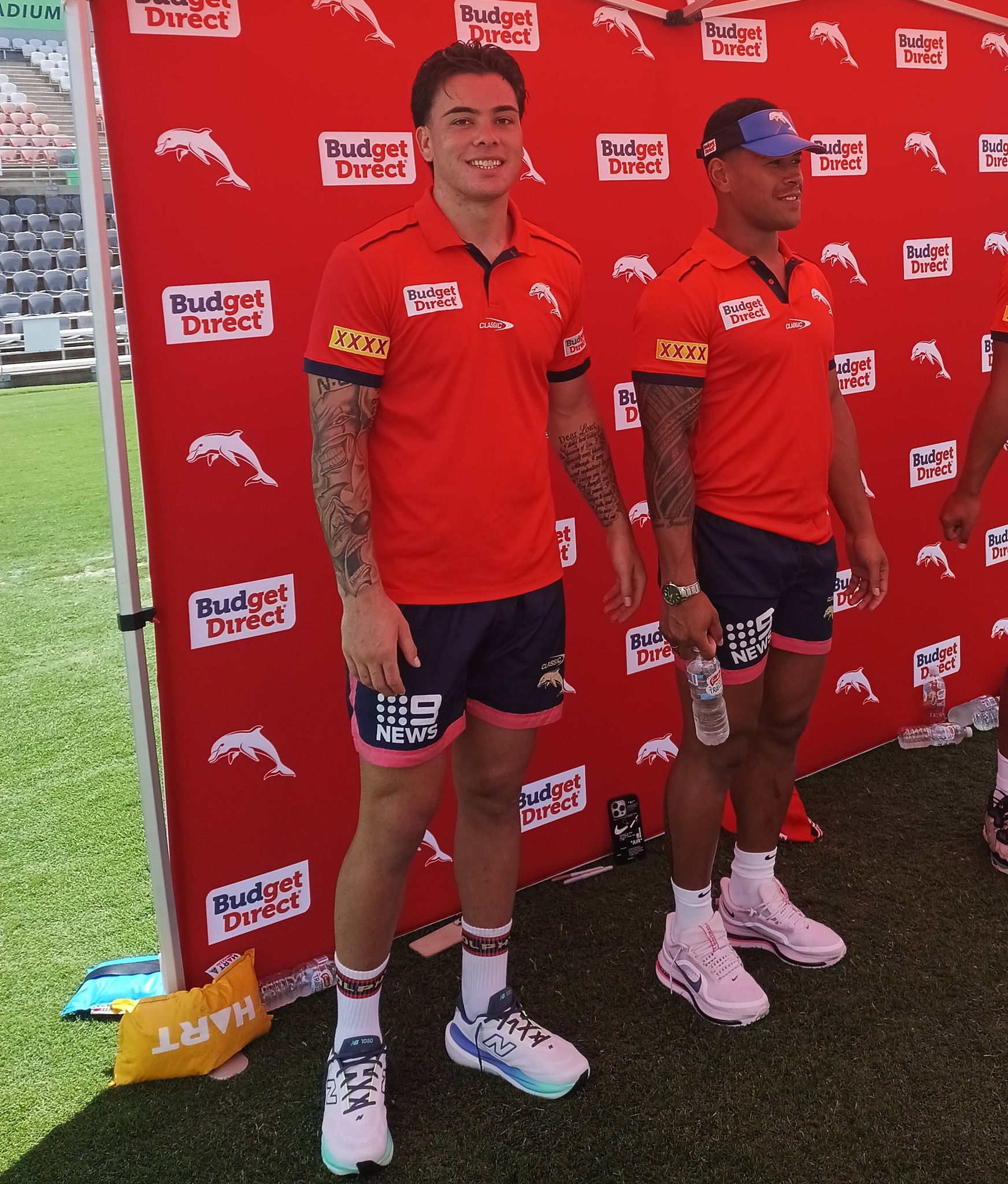

Personal information
- Born: 15 September 2003 (age 23) Onehunga, New Zealand
- Height: 196 cm (6 ft 5 in)
- Weight: 110 kg (17 st 5 lb)

Playing information
- Position: Prop
Club
Years	Team	Pld	T	G	FG	P
2024	Newcastle Knights	1	0	0	0	0
2025–	Dolphins	1	0	0	0	0
	Total	2	0	0	0	0
- Source: As of 5 July 2026
- Father: Murphy Su'a

Sebastian Su'a (born 15 September 2003) is a New Zealand professional rugby league footballer who plays as a prop forward for the Dolphins in the National Rugby League (NRL).

== Background ==
Born in Onehunga, New Zealand, Su'a played his junior rugby league for the Mount Albert Lions. He also played rugby union growing up. He is the son of former New Zealand test cricketer Murphy Su'a.

== Playing career ==
=== Early years ===
After a stint with the Akarana Falcons, Su'a joined the Newcastle Knights in 2022.

=== Newcastle Knights (2024) ===
In 2024, Su'a signed an NRL development contract with the Knights, moving into the NRL top 30 squad in 2025. In round 25 of the 2024 NRL season, he made his NRL debut for the Knights against the South Sydney Rabbitohs. He was originally named 18th man, but following the loss of Tyson Frizell due to foul play, the Knights were able to activate Su'a as a usable player. His night finished early, after he was sin-binned for a high tackle.

=== Dolphins (2025- ) ===
On 27 February 2025, the Dolphins announced that they had signed Su'a for the 2026 and 2027 seasons. Su'a was granted an immediate release by the Knights to join the Dolphins in 2025. On 13 April, the move was immediate with Su'a in a swap deal with Dolphins player Mason Teague.

In round 18 of the 2026 NRL season against the Newcastle Knights at McDonald Jones Stadium, Su'a played as an interchange in his first match for the Dolphins. The forward then went onto win the 2026 Queensland Cup and NRL State Championship playing for the Redcliffe Dolphins.
