= Wollongong High School of the Performing Arts =

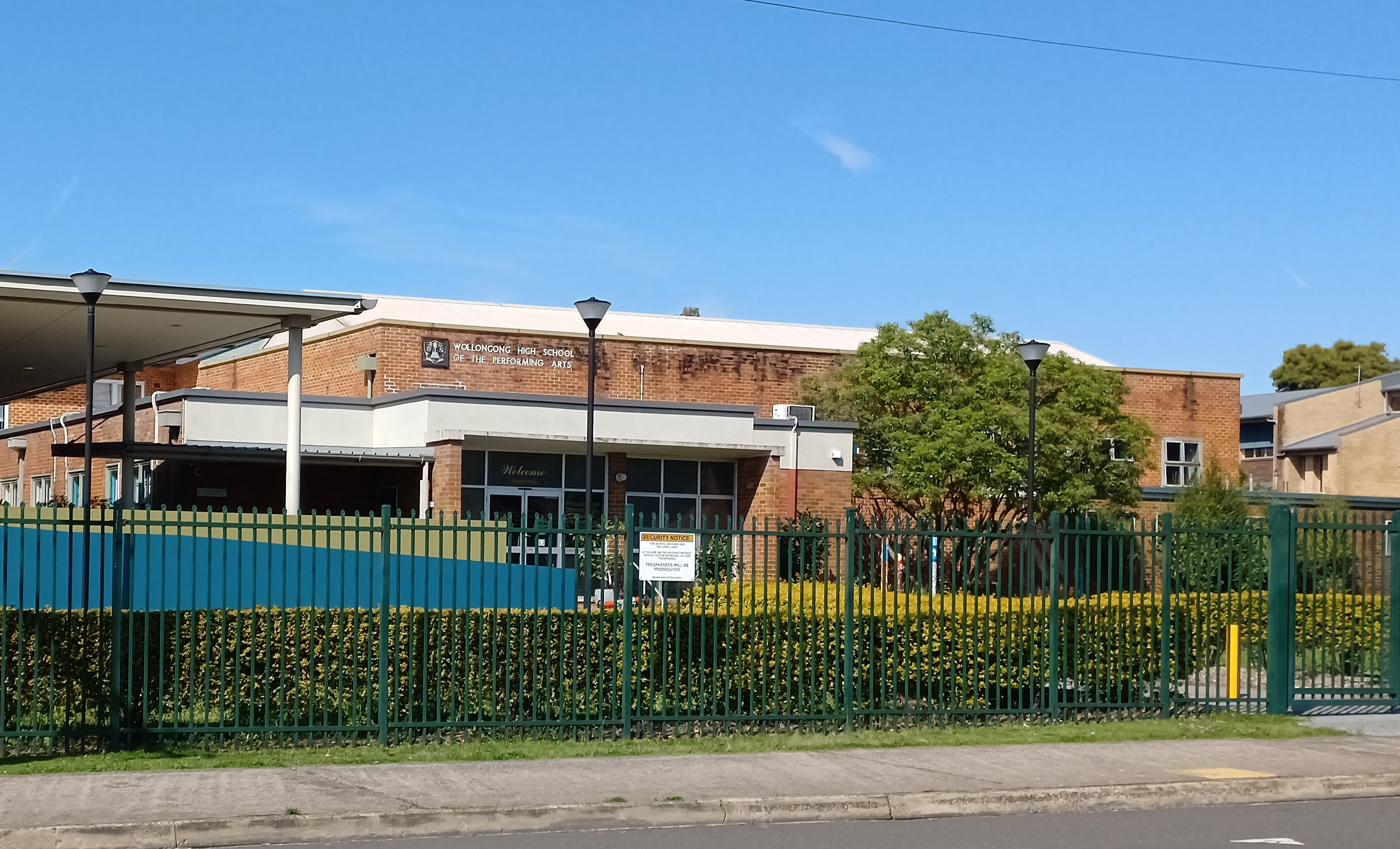

Location
- Fairy Meadow, New South Wales; Australia; 34°24′23″S 150°53′22″E

Information
- Former name: Wollongong High School
- Type: Government-funded co-educational comprehensive and specialist secondary day school
- Motto: Latin: Age Quod Agis (Whatever you do, do well)
- Established: 1916; 110 years ago
- School district: Illawarra
- Educational authority: New South Wales Department of Education
- Specialist: Performing arts
- Principal: Kylie Woods
- Teaching staff: 86.0 FTE (2018)
- Years: 7–12
- Enrolment: 1,188 (2018)
- Campus type: Suburban
- Colours: Green, black and yellow
- Website: wollongong-h.schools.nsw.gov.au

The Wollongong High School of the Performing Arts is a government-funded co-educational comprehensive and specialist secondary day school with speciality in performing arts, located in Fairy Meadow, a suburb of Wollongong, New South Wales, Australia.

Established in 1916, the school enrolled approximately 1,190 students in 2018, from Year 7 to Year 12, of whom five percent identified as Indigenous Australians and 25 per cent were from a language background other than English. The school is operated by the NSW Department of Education.

Approximately one-third of students gain entry through auditions.

== History ==
The school was established in 1916 in Smith Street Wollongong as Wollongong Home Science School, for girls only. At the time it was the only high school between Sydney and the Victorian border.

== Notable alumni ==
- Natalie Bassingthwaighte – singer and actress
- Ashley Fisher – former tennis player
- Nicholas Cowdery AO, QC – former New South Wales Director of Public Prosecutions
- Mark Kerry – Olympic gold medalist in swimming
- Peter MacKinnon and Peter Raengel, bandmates in the Sunday Painters
- Stephen Martin – former politician
- Evelyn Owen – Inventor
- Mary Puckey – first female superintendent of an Australian hospital
- Mary Fowler – professional footballer
- DPR Ian – Korean-Australian singer, rapper and director

== See also ==
- List of government schools in New South Wales
- List of selective high schools in New South Wales
