= Hal Waldron =

Australian prospector and gold diviner (1873–1937)

Harold Alfred Waldron or Hal Waldron (29 November 1873 – 3 October 1937), was also known as "The Professor", was a prospector and gold diviner who travelled throughout Central Australia, and met an untimely, and widely publicised, death.

== Early life ==
Waldron was born on 29 November 1873 in Wollongong in New South Wales to Alfred Adolphus and Lucy Sarah Waldron née Lovett; he was baptised on 28 January 1874.

On 5 July 1899, at the age of 26 and now living around Woollahra, he married his first wife, Clarence Vere Deniehy, who died 29 February 1932. Clarence was the daughter of Daniel Deniehy. Following her death, and now 60 years old, Waldron married Elizabeth Tibbetts, who also died in 1935; forming a huge part of his desire to travel throughout Central Australia.

== Life in the Northern Territory ==
Waldron began prospecting around Central Australia in 1935, presumably after his second wife's death, in many trackless places and he was a well-known eccentric "even in a land of queer people".

He was known everywhere in the outback as "The Professor" but, although he did spend time at the University of Sydney, there appears to be no justification for the title. It is said that he appeared to be a man of substantial means and that it was not known how he financed his numerous expeditions, but it was his aim to find a new, rich, goldfield in Australia. Waldron said that he was led by the spirit of his dead wife who led him when he was wandering in the desert and that she appeared to him every night when he held a séance to commune with her.

It was this spirit that told Waldron not to stay at Moonlight Rockhole, a goldfield he found in 1935, and instead he continued to the already "discovered" The Granites goldfield. When camped 80 kilometres from The Granites Waldron, and his teams, camp was destroyed in a fire (including all food supplies) and, rather than return to the rich Moonlight Rockhole with most of his team, he continued on to (via a trip to Alice Springs to collect necessary supplies) approximately 100 km from Ti-Tree where he was killed in questionable circumstances.

How Waldron died is still a mystery with many believing that Jack Simpson, known as "The Brindled Stag", and Doug Cooper, itinerant prospectors, had in fact murdered him. Walter Smith said that Simpson and Cooper, who had already stolen from him, latched on to Waldron (who he referred to only as "the gold diviner") and went with him to his camp and returned with the story, that the Tennant Creek police accepted, that Waldron's "head had been battered when, in falling from a camel, he caught his foot in a stirrup and was dragged at a gallop across the country". It is, instead, believed by many that the two killed Waldron with a blow to the head and, to make it appear accidental, attached the body to a mule and dragged in around.

An inquiry was made into the death and it was reported in newspapers around Australia (most of which reported that he fell from a horse). Despite no one being prosecuted many Warlipiri people firmly believe that it was a case of murder.

The land where Waldron camped is known by the Warlipiri traditional owners as Munyupanji and it is located just within the Wirliyajarrayi Land Trust area (previously Willowra Station) and it is here that he is buried with the epitath "To strive, to seek, to find and not to yield".

A hill nearby is also known, in English, as "Waldron's Hill".

== Resources ==
Waldron's diaries are available at the Alice Springs Public Library and are digitised on Territory Stories, the Library & Archives NT digital library:

- Library & Archives NT. (1937). Waldron Diaries, volume 1. Historical Publications Collection. https://hdl.handle.net/10070/765789.
- Library & Archives NT. (1937). Waldron Diaries, volume 2. Historical Publications Collection. https://hdl.handle.net/10070/765790.
