= Fletcher Sharpe =

Australian rugby league player

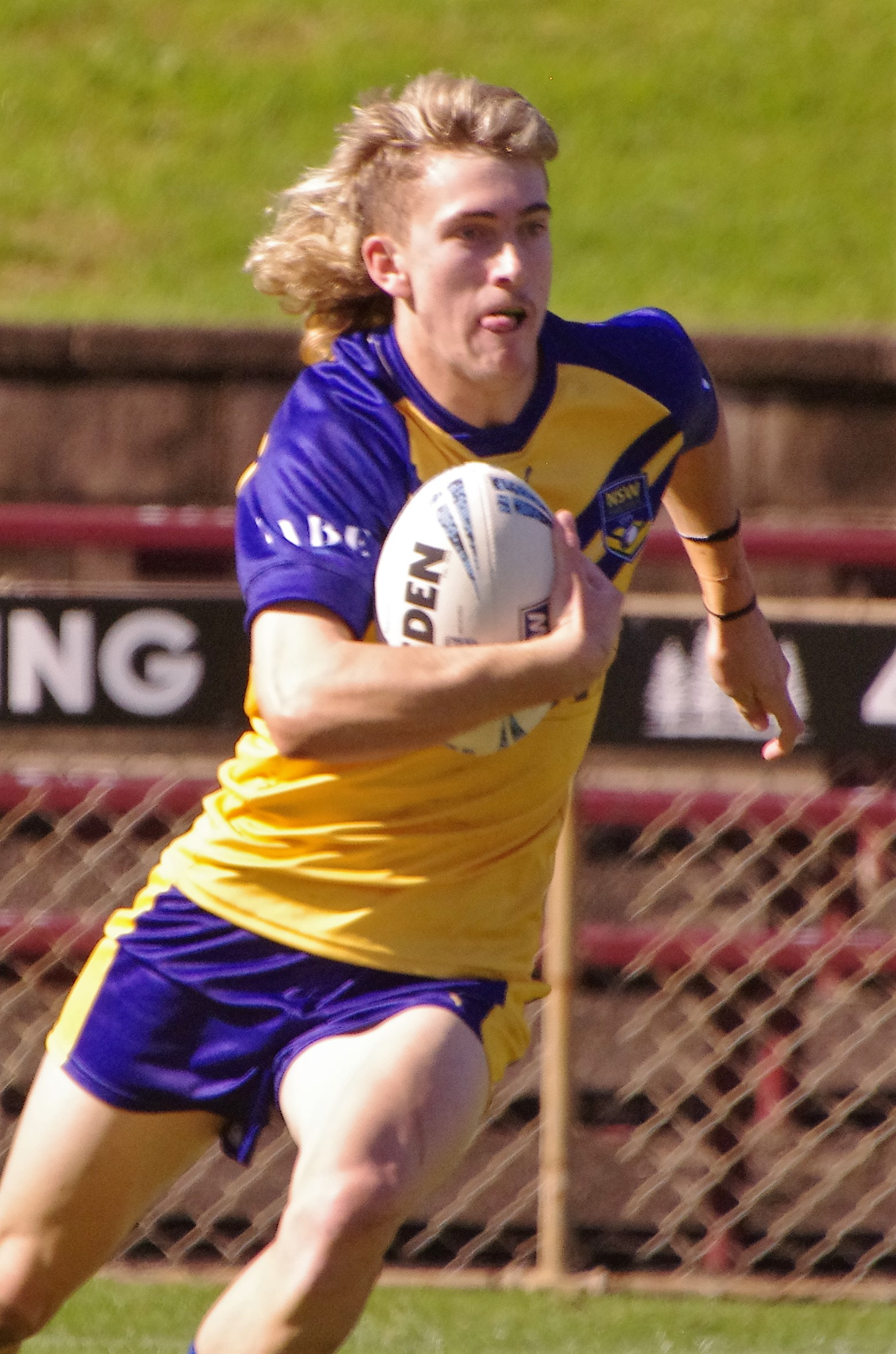

Personal information
- Born: 3 May 2004 (age 22) Maitland, New South Wales, Australia
- Height: 186 cm (6 ft 1 in)
- Weight: 86 kg (13 st 8 lb)

Playing information
- Position: Five-eighth, Fullback
Club
Years	Team	Pld	T	G	FG	P
2024–	Newcastle Knights	52	35	0	0	140
Representative
Years	Team	Pld	T	G	FG	P
2024	Prime Minister's XIII	1	0	0	0	0
- Source: As of 6 November 2026

Fletcher Sharpe (born 3 May 2004) is an Australian professional rugby league footballer who plays as a five-eighth for the Newcastle Knights in the National Rugby League.

He previously played as a winger or fullback before moving to five-eighth in 2025.

== Background ==
Born in Maitland, New South Wales, Sharpe attended St Joseph's College, Lochinvar and All Saints' College St Mary's, Maitland and played his junior rugby league for the Cessnock Goannas, before being signed by the Newcastle Knights.

== Playing career ==
=== Early years ===
Sharpe spent his early years rising through the junior ranks for the Newcastle Knights as a halfback.

=== 2024 ===
In February, Sharpe's contract with the Newcastle outfit was extended until the end of 2026, along with an immediate promotion into the club's top 30 NRL squad. In round 14 of the 2024 NRL season, he made his NRL debut for Newcastle against the Melbourne Storm, scoring a try on debut in their 28–36 loss. In round 24, Sharpe scored four tries in Newcastle's 34-18 victory over the Wests Tigers. In round 26, Sharpe scored a hat-trick in Newcastle's 36-14 victory over the Gold Coast.

Sharpe would become a mainstay for the Newcastle Knights on the wing for the rest of the season after his debut before the Knights got knocked out in round 1 of the NRL final series by the North Queensland Cowboys but not before also scoring a try in the 28-16 loss

He would go on to be selected in the Australian PMs XIII where he got selected to play his natural fullback position in a dominant 42-20 win against the PNG PMs XIII

=== 2025 ===
On 22 January, Newcastle Knights announced that Sharpe had re-signed with the club until the end of the 2028 season. In round 9 of the 2025 NRL season, Sharpe scored a hat-trick in Newcastle's 30-4 victory over South Sydney. Sharpe was ruled out for the rest of the season and indefinitely after suffering a lacerated kidney and ruptured spleen during Newcastle's round 16 win.

=== 2026 ===
Sharpe played 26 games for Newcastle in the 2026 NRL season including their 2026 NRL Grand Final loss to the Sydney Roosters.

== Statistics ==
Year	Team	Games	Tries	Pts
2024	Newcastle Knights	12	11	44
2025	Newcastle Knights	14	11	44
2026	Newcastle Knights	23	12	48
2027	Newcastle Knights			
	Totals	49	34	136
