= Bev Lawson =

Australian police officer (1940-1998)

Beverley Ann Lawson APM (14 October 1940 - 22 January 1998) was an Australian police officer who was the first woman to reach the position of deputy commissioner within the New South Wales Police Force.

== Early life ==
Lawson was born in Wollongong, in New South Wales, and was the daughter of Joseph and Vera (née Rowles) Lawson. She attended local schools and, throughout her education, was a promising athlete and musician and, in addition to playing piano, she represented NSW in hockey and softball.

Lawson left school at the age of 15 to work as a typist and the Port Kembla steelworks, which were operated by BlueScope, where her father was employed as a miner. She soon found that this did not appeal as a career and, in the early 1960s, joined the New South Wales Police Force. She was the only woman at the Redfern Police Academy in a class of 111. On 11 May 1964 she graduated as a probationary constable.

== Career as a police officer ==
Lawson spent the majority of her career as a police officer stationed in Wollongong and she was promoted a number of times and, in many of these promotions, became the first woman to hold the role. The highest rank that she held was deputy commissioner, field operations, in February 1997. She was also an active member of the Police Association of New South Wales.

In addition to her police work she was very active in the Wollongong community and was involved in many community organisations.

Lawsons career and reputation suffered following the Royal Commission into the New South Wales Police Service in which she admitted to 'lost opportunities' in investigating allegations, relating to child sexual abuse, made against local priests Michael Evans and Peter Comensoli. She was also implicated in the lack of action taken to investigate the actions of Tony Bevan, a former mayor of Wollongong.

== Death ==
Lawson died of stroke on 22 January 1998.

Condolences for her death were given in NSW Parliament and Paul Whelan, the then Minister for Police, said of her:

For 34 years until that day she had been one of the New South Wales Police Service's most dedicated and loyal officers. She was popular, respected, competent and effective. She was a trailblazer in the true sense of the word. Bev Lawson was the first to do many things on behalf of women police throughout the country. Her successes, particularly in the early days of the service when women were not encouraged to achieve, have been an inspiration to thousands of other women officers who have followed her in achieving success

— Paul Whelan, Death of Deputy Commissioner Beverley Ann Lawson, Hansard, 31 March 1998

== Honours ==
Lawson was the recipient of the following awards:

- National Medal; received 20 January 1981.
- Australian Police Medal; received 14 June 1993.

== Legacy ==
The Bev Lawson memorial award, for women in law enforcement, was established in her honour.
