= Kai Pearce-Paul =

England international rugby league footballer

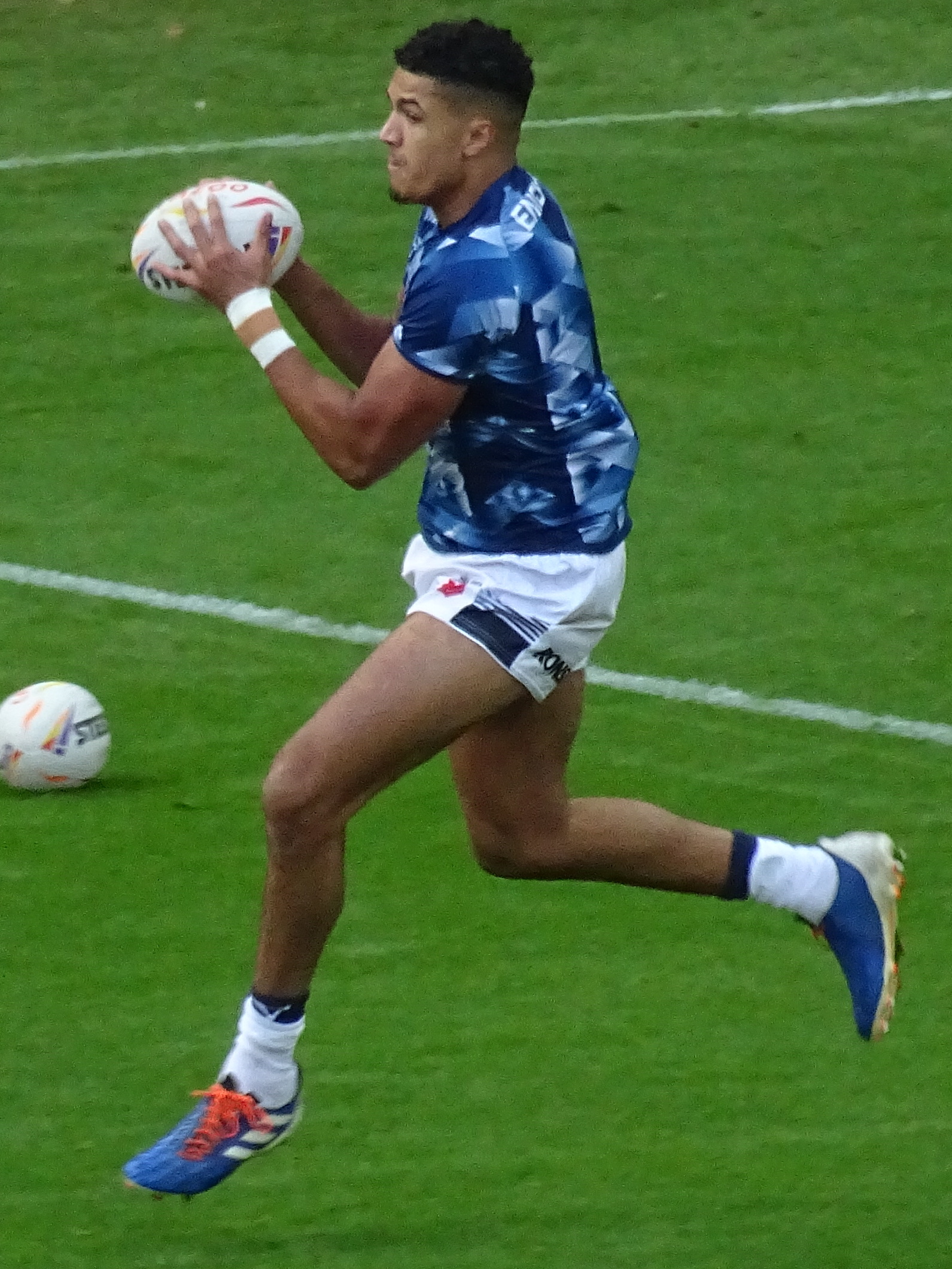

Personal information
- Full name: Kai Winfield Pearce-Paul
- Born: 19 February 2001 (age 25) Lewisham, London, England
- Height: 198 cm (6 ft 6 in)
- Weight: 108 kg (17 st 0 lb)

Playing information
- Position: Second-row, Centre
Club
Years	Team	Pld	T	G	FG	P
2020–23	Wigan Warriors	61	7	0	0	28
2024–25	Newcastle Knights	44	3	0	0	12
2026–	Wests Tigers	12	4	0	0	16
	Total	117	14	0	0	56
Representative
Years	Team	Pld	T	G	FG	P
2021	England Knights	1	0	0	0	0
2022–	England	9	2	0	0	8
- Source: As of 6 November 2026
- Relatives: Kam Pearce-Paul (brother)

Kai Pearce-Paul (born 19 February 2001) is an English professional rugby league footballer who plays as a second-row forward for the Wests Tigers in the National Rugby League and England at international level.

He previously played for the Wigan Warriors in the Super League and Newcastle Knights in the NRL. He played as a centre earlier in his career.

== Background ==
Pearce-Paul played his amateur rugby league for the Croydon Hurricanes. He is a product of the London Broncos academy.

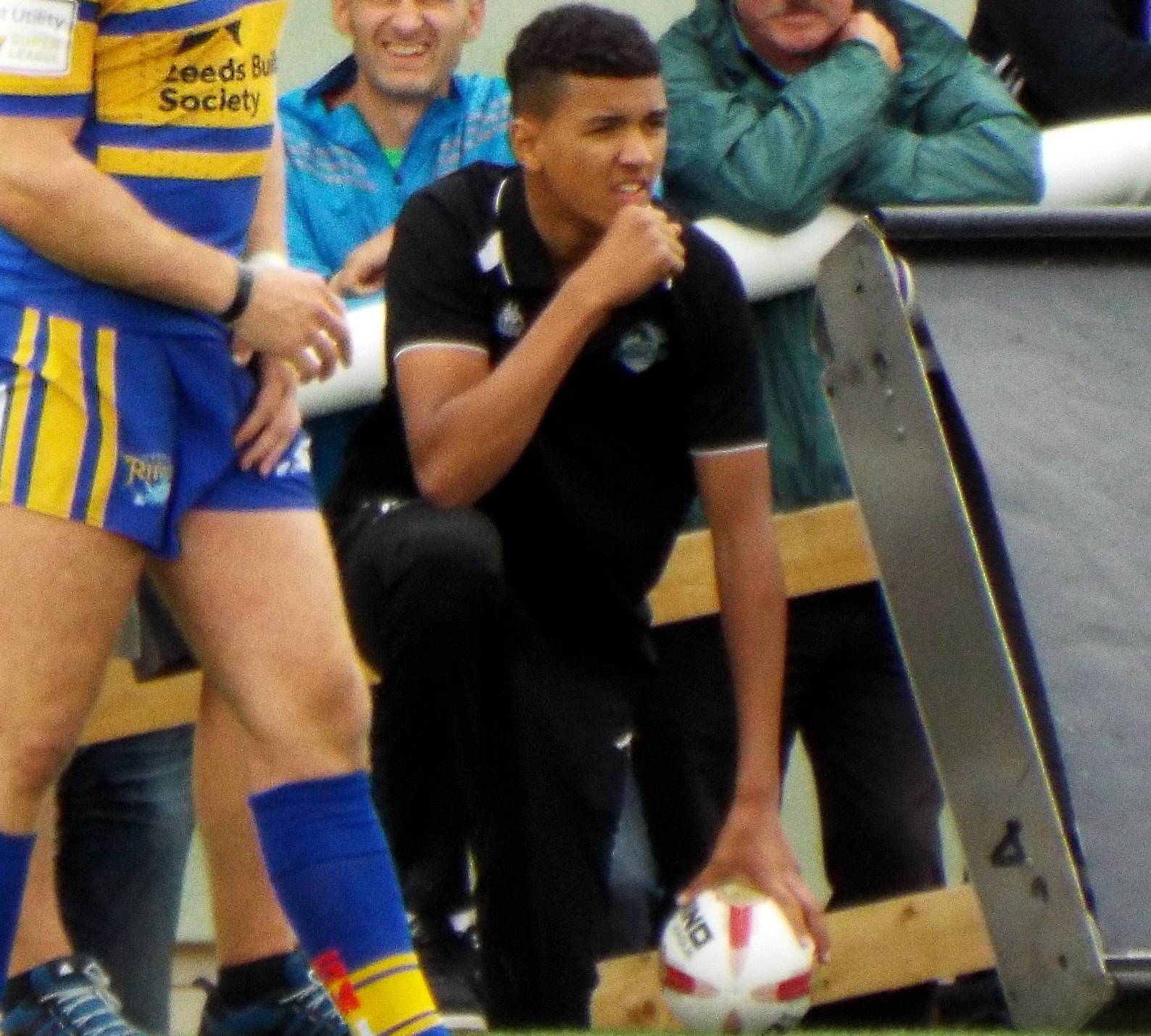
Pearce-Paul as part of the London Broncos academy in 2016

Pearce-Paul is of English, Faroese, St Vincent and Antiguan descent. He is the younger brother of former London Broncos and London Skolars player Kam Pearce-Paul and older brother of Saracens rugby union footballer Kaden Pearce-Paul. His father Junior Paul played for the London Broncos.

== Club career ==
=== Wigan Warriors ===
==== 2020 ====
Pearce-Paul made his Super League debut in round 14 of the 2020 Super League season for the Warriors against St Helens where Wigan went on to lose 42–0 against a much more experienced St Helens squad, Pearce-Paul started from the bench and became Wigan Warriors player #1109.

==== 2022 ====
Pearce-Paul played 18 games for Wigan in the 2022 Super League season including the clubs shock semi-final loss against Leeds.

In December, it was announced that Pearce-Paul had signed a two-year contract with the Newcastle Knights in the NRL, starting in 2024.

==== 2023 ====
In 2023, Pearce-Paul played in 23 matches for Wigan, scoring three tries. His final game for the club was the 2023 Super League Grand Final, in which Wigan defeated the Catalans Dragons 10-2.

=== Newcastle Knights ===
==== 2024 ====
In round 1 of the 2024 NRL season, Pearce-Paul made his club debut for Newcastle in their loss against Canberra. He played 22 games for Newcastle in the 2024 NRL season as the club finished 8th and qualified for the finals. He played in their elimination finals loss against North Queensland.

=== 2025 ===
On 6 June, the Wests Tigers announced that they had signed Pearce-Paul on a three year deal starting in 2026.

=== 2026 ===
He made a memorable Wests Tigers debut with two tries on 14 March 2026 in the 44-16 win over North Queensland Cowboys. Pearce-Paul played 12 matches for the Wests Tigers in the 2026 NRL season as the club finished 15th on the table.

== International career ==
In 2022, Pearce-Paul was selected for England's 2021 Rugby League World Cup campaign, and made his debut against Greece scoring a try in a 94-4 victory.

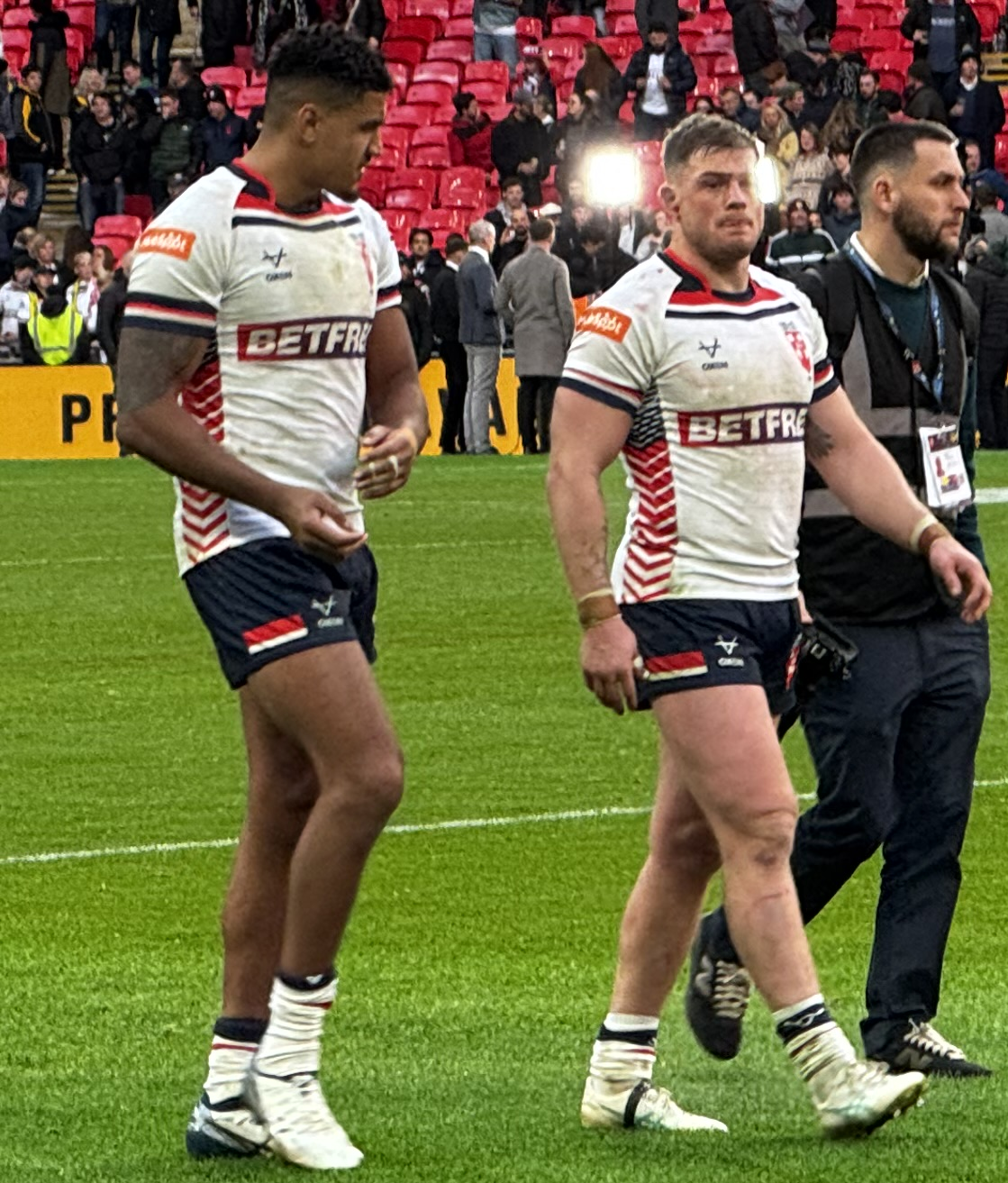
Pearce-Paul & Morgan Knowles in 2025

== Honours ==
=== Wigan Warriors ===
- Super League
  - Winners (1): 2023
- League Leaders' Shield
  - Winners (2): 2020, 2023
- Challenge Cup
  - Winners (1): 2022

== Statistics ==
Year	Team	Games	Tries	Pts
2020	Wigan Warriors	1	0	0
2021	Wigan Warriors	19	0	0
2022	Wigan Warriors	18	4	16
2023	Wigan Warriors	23	3	12
2024	Newcastle Knights	22	1	4
2025	Newcastle Knights	22	2	8
2026	Wests Tigers	12	4	16
2027	Wests Tigers	0	0	0
	Total	117	14	56
