= Jacob Saifiti =

Fiji international rugby league footballer

Jacob "JSaf" Saifiti
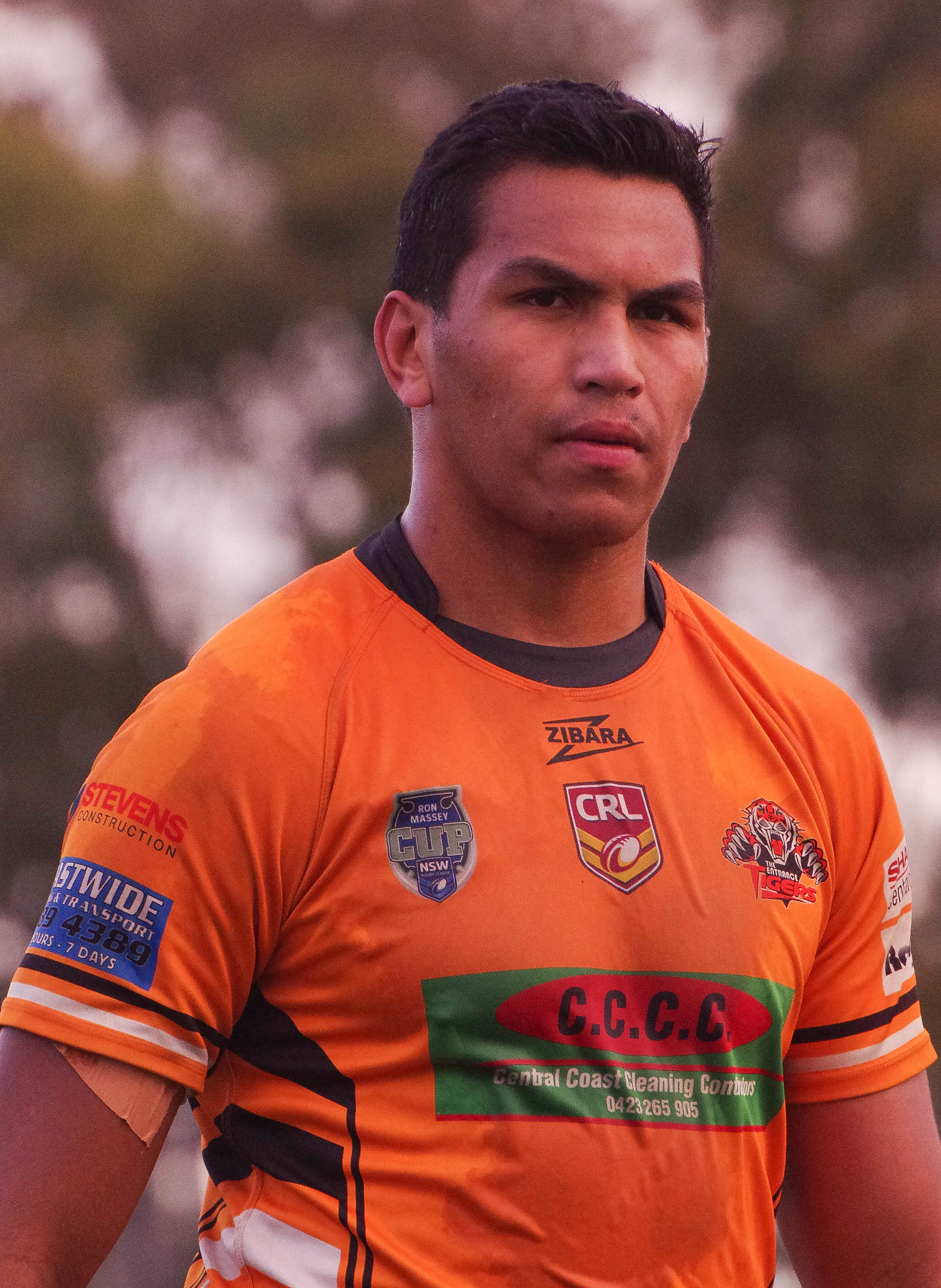

Personal information
- Full name: Jacob Saifiti
- Born: 1 May 1996 (age 30) Newcastle, New South Wales, Australia
- Height: 195 cm (6 ft 5 in)
- Weight: 114 kg (17 st 13 lb)

Playing information
- Position: Prop
Club
Years	Team	Pld	T	G	FG	P
2016–	Newcastle Knights	192	13	0	0	52
Representative
Years	Team	Pld	T	G	FG	P
2015–	Fiji	10	1	0	0	4
2022–23	New South Wales	2	1	0	0	4
- Source: As of 22 November 2026
- Relatives: Daniel Saifiti (brother)

Jacob Saifiti (born 1 May 1996) is a Fiji international rugby league footballer who plays as a prop forward for the Newcastle Knights in the NRL.

== Background ==
Saifiti was born in Newcastle, New South Wales, Australia. He is of Fijian and Samoan descent and moved to the Central Coast at a young age. He is the identical twin brother of Daniel Saifiti.

Saifiti played his junior rugby league for the Terrigal Sharks and The Entrance Tigers, before joining the Newcastle Knights in 2015.

== Playing career ==
=== 2015 ===
In 2015, Saifiti played for the Newcastle Knights' NYC team. On 2 May, he played for Fiji against Papua New Guinea, alongside his twin brother Daniel. On 27 September, he played in Newcastle's 2015 New South Wales Cup Grand Final win over the Wyong Roos. During the year, he re-signed with the Newcastle club on a two-year contract.

=== 2016 ===
In round 1 of the 2016 NRL season, Saifiti made his NRL debut for the Newcastle Knights against the Gold Coast Titans, playing alongside his brother Daniel, becoming the first twins in Australian rugby league's 108-year history to debut together. On 12 May, he and his brother extended their contracts with the Knights from the end of 2017 until the end of 2018. He made a total of 18 appearances for Newcastle in his debut season as the club finished last on the table.

=== 2017 ===
Saifiti played 21 games for the Newcastle club in the 2017 season, before having his contract extended until the end of 2020. Newcastle would finish bottom of the table for a third straight season.

=== 2018 ===
Saifiti was limited to only eight games for Newcastle in the 2018 NRL season as the club finished 11th on the table.

=== 2019 ===
Saifiti played 7 games for Newcastle in the 2019 NRL season as the club finished 11th on the table.

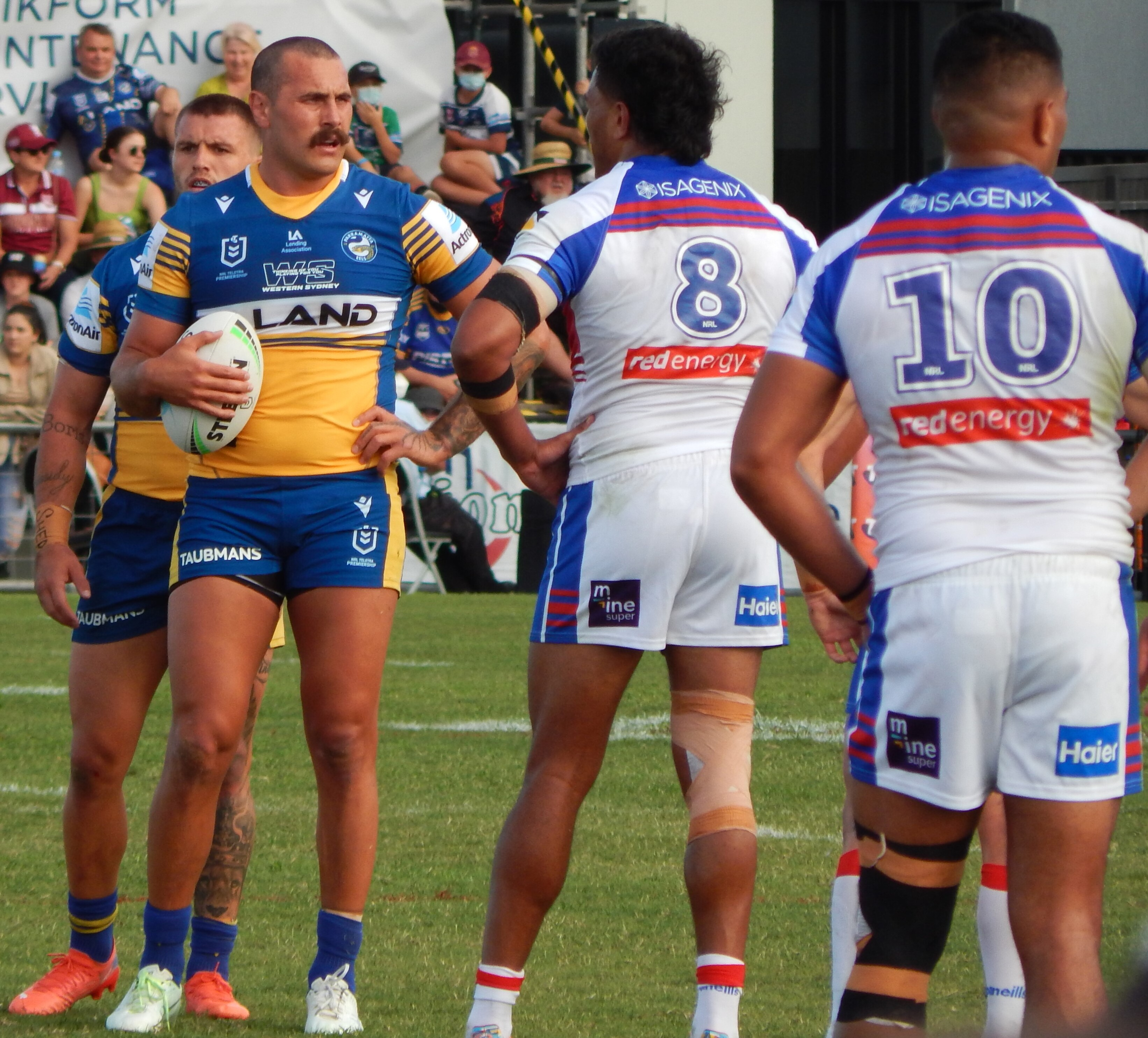
Jacob Saifiti (8) and Daniel Saifiti (10) wait as Reagan Campbell Gillard waits to play the ball in 2021

=== 2020 ===
Saifiti played 21 games for Newcastle in the 2020 NRL season. He played in Newcastle's first finals game since 2013 which was a 46-20 loss against South Sydney in the elimination final.

=== 2021 ===
He played 23 matches for Newcastle in the 2021 NRL season including the club's elimination finals loss against Parramatta.

=== 2022 ===
Saifiti was selected as a reserve player for New South Wales in the 2022 State of Origin series. He made his Origin debut against Queensland after the withdrawal of Jordan McLean in Game 3 of the series at Suncorp Stadium. Saifiti scored a first half try as New South Wales eventually lost the match 22-12.

Saifiti played 23 games for Newcastle in the 2022 NRL season as the club missed the finals finishing 14th on the table.

=== 2023 ===
In round 2 of the 2023 NRL season, Saifiti was sent off for a dangerous high tackle on Wests Tigers player Jake Simpkin. Newcastle would go on to win the match 14-12. Saifiti was later suspended for five matches over the incident. On 3 July, Saifiti was a surprise selection for New South Wales ahead of their match in game 3 of the 2023 State of Origin series. In round 27, Saifiti captained Newcastle for the first time and scored the opening try in a 32-12 win over the St. George Illawarra Dragons. Saifiti played a total of 21 games for Newcastle in the 2023 NRL season as the club finished 5th on the table. Saifiti played in both finals games as Newcastle were eliminated in the second week of the finals by the New Zealand Warriors.

=== 2024 ===
Saifiti played 16 games for Newcastle in the 2024 NRL season as the club finished 8th and qualified for the finals.

=== 2025 ===
Saifiti made 16 appearances for Newcastle in the 2025 NRL season as the club finished with the wooden spoon for a fifth time. It was Saifiti's third wooden spoon as a player.

=== 2026 ===
Saifiti played 18 matches for Newcastle in the 2026 NRL season. Saifiti did not feature in the Knights' 2026 NRL Grand Final loss to the Sydney Roosters due to a four-match suspension.

== Statistics ==
Year	Team	Games	Tries	Pts
2016	Newcastle Knights	18	2	8
2017	Newcastle Knights	21	1	4
2018	Newcastle Knights	8		
2019	Newcastle Knights	7		
2020	Newcastle Knights	21	3	12
2021	Newcastle Knights	23	3	12
2022	Newcastle Knights	23	1	4
2023	Newcastle Knights	21	1	4
2024	Newcastle Knights	16	1	4
2025	Newcastle Knights	16		
2026	Newcastle Knights	18	1	4
2027	Newcastle Knights			
	Totals	192	13	52

== Controversy ==
On 2 December 2018, Saifiti was found unconscious and with a broken leg after a fight with Dane Cordner, the brother of NSW captain and Sydney Roosters player Boyd Cordner. Saifiti was later cleared of any wrongdoing but was fined $50,000 by Newcastle over the incident.
