= The Sunday Painters =

Australian avant-pop band

- Origin: Wollongong, New South Wales, Australia
- Genres: Avant-pop
- Years active: 1979–1986
- Labels: Terminal
- Past members: Bruce Ellis; Peter MacKinnon; Katherine Lorenc; Peter Raengel; Dennis Kennedy; Allan Coop; Eddie Zeidan; Kerrie Erwin; Tony Tziolas; Chris Flanagan

The Sunday Painters were an Australian avant-pop band formed in Wollongong in 1979 by Peter MacKinnon on guitar and Peter Raengel on vocals, guitar, bass guitar and keyboards. In 1982 Dennis Kennedy joined on bass guitar but switched to lead guitar in 1984. The group issued two studio albums, Something to Do (1982) and Fourth Annual Report (1983), before disbanding in 1986. American label, What's Your Rupture?, compiled their early extended plays and a live album, which was issued as In My Dreams, in 2015. Peter Raengel died in September 2008.

== History ==
The Sunday Painters were an Australian avant-pop band formed in Wollongong in 1979 by Bruce Ellis on synthesisers (ex-Art Throbs), Peter MacKinnon on guitar, Katherine Lorenc on vocals, flute and keyboards and Peter Raengel on vocals, guitar, bass guitar and keyboards (ex-Winged Death, Art Throbs). Ellis and Raengel had performed in various groups since secondary school and formulated the Sunday Painters' direction as "part-pop/rock garage band, part-classical experimentalists", with a political focus on oppression, alienation, pain and identity seeking. One of their previous bands, Art Throbs, were recorded by Ellis at Sydney University. Both MacKinnon and Raengel had attended Wollongong High School. Raengel later recalled "We weren't actually musicians before we started, we started off learning our instruments and writing songs."

Two extended plays with three tracks each were issued during 1980, Alternatives to Perfection (April) and Painting by Numbers (1980). Australian musicologist Ian McFarlane found them "strangely appealing" as they demonstrated a garage rock and early Velvet Underground sound. Their third EP, Three Kinds of Escapism, followed in 1981. The group's debut studio album, Something to Do, was released in 1982. McFarlane determined that it "displayed an extraordinary breadth of stylistic reference", citing influences from United Kingdom band Wire for their track "Emotion Sickness" to 1970s krautrockers, Faust and Neu!, for "ECT". In 1982 Dennis Kennedy joined on bass guitar; by 1984 Ellis and Lorenc had left and Kennedy switched to lead guitar. Allan Coop joined on bass guitar and Eddie Zeidan on alto saxophone.

Fourth Annual Report is their second studio album, which was issued in late 1983. McFarlane observed that it varied "from the abrasive ('God is My Biro', 'Concertina') and the eerie ('Surface Paradise') to soundscapes of the epic kind ('Through a Shattered Lens')." MacKinnon left soon after the album appeared. Further changes occurred to the line-up with successive bass guitarists Kerrie Erwin and Tony Tziolas; as well as Chris Flanagan joining on drums. However, no new material was recorded and the group disbanded in 1986. Peter Raengel died in September 2008, aged 47. American label, What's Your Rupture?, compiled their early EPs and a live album, which was issued as In My Dreams, in 2015. To explain the group's lack of contemporaneous recognition, Illawarra Mercury's Glen Humphries described their material, "a mix of full-on electronic noise, rock, discordant pop, classical, punk, jazz and whatever else they wanted to play - was probably too out there for Wollongong in the 1980s."

== Members ==
- Bruce Ellis – synthesisers
- Peter MacKinnon – guitar
- Katherine Lorenc – vocals, flute, keyboards
- Peter Raengel – vocals, guitar, bass guitar, keyboards (died 2008)
- Dennis Kennedy – bass guitar, guitar
- Allan Coop – bass guitar
- Eddie Zeidan – alto saxophone
- Kerrie Erwin – bass guitar
- Tony Tziolas – bass guitar
- Chris Flanagan – drums

== Discography ==
=== Albums ===
- Something to Do (1982) – Terminal Records
- Fourth Annual Report (1983) – Terminal Records

=== Compilation albums ===
- In My Dreams (2015) – What's Your Rupture?

=== Live albums ===
- On the Beach (1983)

=== Extended plays ===
- Like a Reptile (1979)
- In My Dreams (1980)
- Alternatives to Perfection (April 1980)
- Painting by Numbers (October 1980)
- Three Kinds of Escapism (1981)
