= Fletcher Myers =

Australian rugby league footballer

Personal information
- Full name: Fletcher Myers
- Born: 12 May 2003 (age 22) Newcastle, New South Wales, Australia
- Height: 187 cm (6 ft 2 in)
- Weight: 94 kg (14 st 11 lb)

Playing information
- Position: Centre, Wing
Club
Years	Team	Pld	T	G	FG	P
2024–25	South Sydney	8	2	9	0	26
- Source: As of 16 September 2025

Fletcher Myers (born 12 May 2003) is an Australian professional rugby league footballer who most recently played as a centre or winger for the South Sydney Rabbitohs in the National Rugby League.

== Early life ==
Myers was born in Newcastle, New South Wales and played his junior football for the Waratah Mayfield Cheetahs. He represented New South Wales under‑16s and was named man‑of‑the‑match in the NSW Koori vs QLD Murri clash in 2019.

== Playing career ==
=== Development and NSW Cup ===
Originally part of the Manly Warringah Sea Eagles and Newcastle Knights development systems, Myers played 20 NSW Cup matches across those clubs before joining South Sydney in mid‑2024.

=== Playing career ===
Myers made his first-grade debut in Round 18 of the 2024 NRL season, scoring two tries against the Melbourne Storm. Through to 22 July 2025, he has played eight NRL matches and scored two tries. In September 2025, it was announced that Myers would be departing the South Sydney club after not being offered a new contract.
