= Leo Thompson =

NZ international rugby league footballer

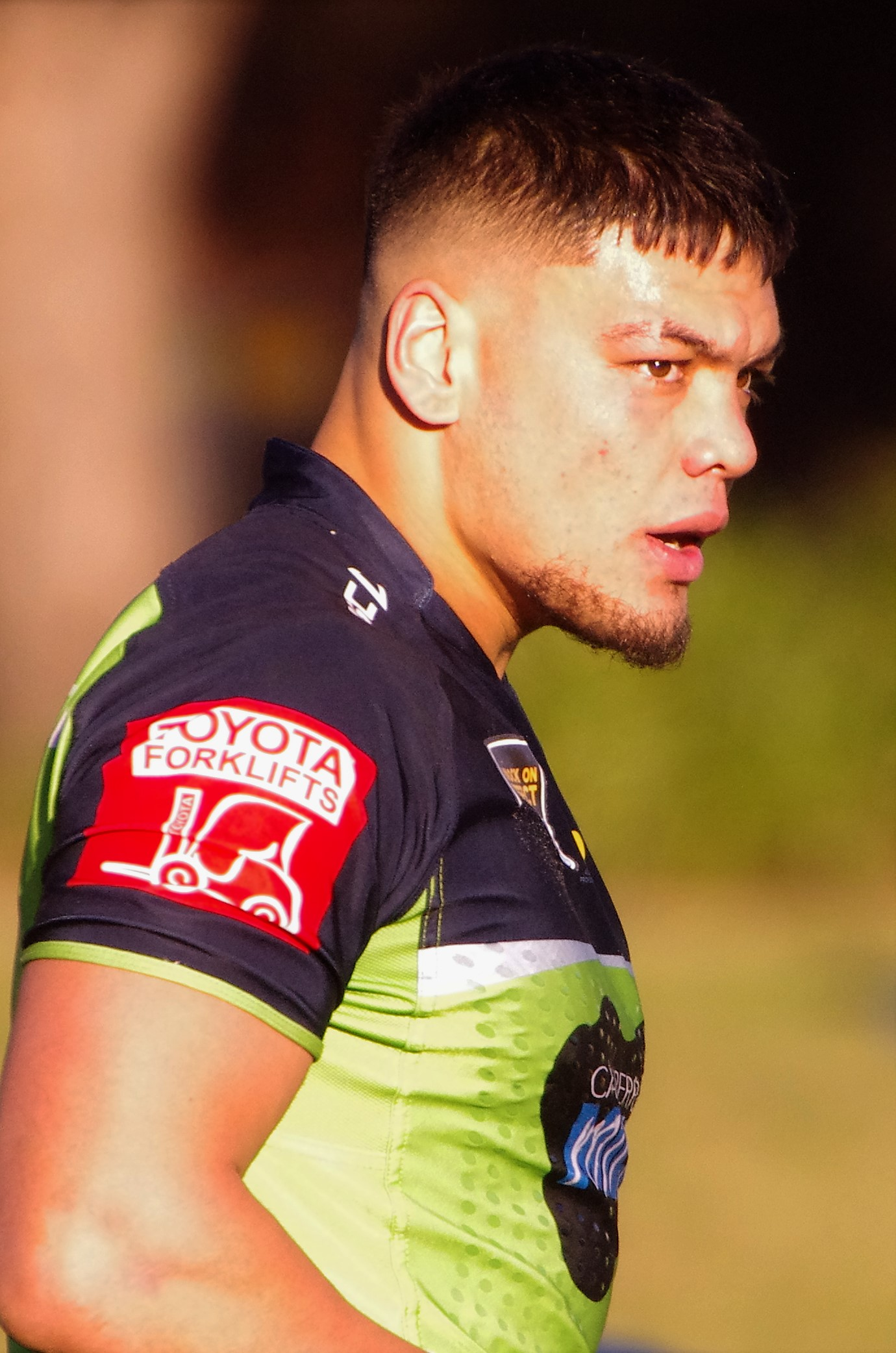

Personal information
- Born: 28 May 2000 (age 26) Muriwai, Gisborne, New Zealand
- Height: 186 cm (6 ft 1 in)
- Weight: 107 kg (16 st 12 lb)

Playing information
- Position: Prop, Lock
Club
Years	Team	Pld	T	G	FG	P
2022–25	Newcastle Knights	80	3	0	0	12
2026–	Canterbury Bulldogs	19	0	0	0	0
	Total	99	3	0	0	12
Representative
Years	Team	Pld	T	G	FG	P
2023–25	Māori All Stars	3	0	0	0	0
2023–	New Zealand	6	1	0	0	4
- Source: As of 6 November 2026
- Relatives: Tyrone Thompson (twin brother)

Leo Thompson (born 28 May 2000) is a New Zealand professional rugby league footballer who plays as a prop for the Canterbury-Bankstown Bulldogs in the National Rugby League and New Zealand at international level.

== Background ==
Born in Muriwai, Gisborne, New Zealand, Thompson is of Māori descent. He played rugby union as a youth, before being signed by the Canberra Raiders.

Thompson is the identical twin brother of Knights teammate Tyrone Thompson.

== Playing career ==
=== Early years ===
Thompson was a part of the Canberra Raiders' Jersey Flegg Cup team in 2020 and 2021. Ahead of the 2022 season, he signed a 2-year contract with the Newcastle Knights.

=== 2022 ===
In March, Thompson had his Knights contract upgraded from a development contract to a Top 30 contract, allowing him to join the NRL squad. In round 1 of the 2022 NRL season, he made his NRL debut for the Knights against the Sydney Roosters.

In July, Thompson had his contract extended until the end of 2025.

=== 2023 ===
Thompson played a total of 25 matches for Newcastle in the 2023 NRL season as the club finished 5th on the table. Thompson played in both finals games as Newcastle were eliminated in the second week of the finals by the New Zealand Warriors.

=== 2024 ===
Thompson played 23 games for Newcastle in the 2024 NRL season as the club finished 8th and qualified for the finals. He played in their elimination finals loss against North Queensland.

=== 2025 ===
On 3 January, Thompson signed a four-year deal to join the Canterbury-Bankstown Bulldogs from 2026 onwards. Thompson played 16 games for Newcastle in the 2025 NRL season as the club finished bottom of the table receiving the Wooden Spoon.

=== 2026 ===
Thompson played 19 matches for the Canterbury outfit in the 2026 NRL season as they finished 12th on the table missing the finals.

== Statistics ==
Year	Team	Games	Tries	Pts
2022	Newcastle Knights	16		
2023	Newcastle Knights	25	1	4
2024	Newcastle Knights	23	1	4
2025	Newcastle Knights	16	1	4
2026	Canterbury-Bankstown Bulldogs	10		
2027	Canterbury-Bankstown Bulldogs			
	Totals	90	3	12
