= David Armstrong (rugby league) =

Australian rugby league footballer

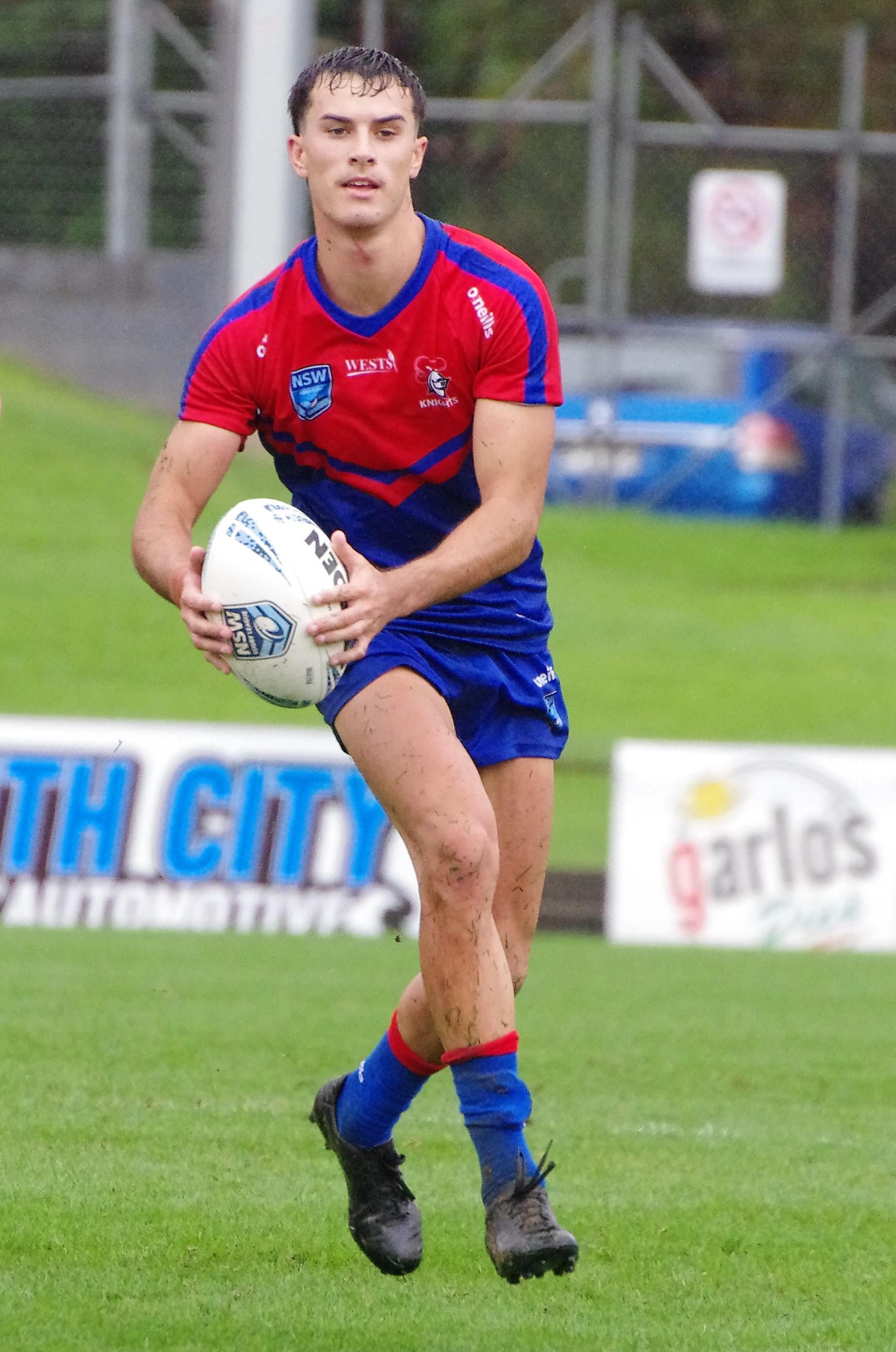

Personal information
- Born: 9 April 2001 (age 25) Moree, New South Wales, Australia
- Height: 6 ft 0 in (1.84 m)
- Weight: 12 st 13 lb (82 kg)

Playing information
- Position: Fullback
Club
| Years | Team | Pld | T | G | FG | P |
|---|---|---|---|---|---|---|
| 2024 | Newcastle Knights | 5 | 5 | 0 | 0 | 20 |
| 2025– | Leigh Leopards | 32 | 17 | 0 | 0 | 68 |
| | Total | 37 | 22 | 0 | 0 | 88 |
- Source: As of 30 August 2025

David Armstrong (born 9 April 2001) is an Australian professional rugby league footballer who plays as a fullback for the Leigh Leopards in the Super League.

He previously played for the Newcastle Knights in the National Rugby League.

== Background ==
Born in Moree, New South Wales, Armstrong played his junior rugby league for the Mungindi Grasshoppers before moving to Goondiwindi, Queensland with his family when he was 12. He finished his schooling as a boarder at Toowoomba Grammar School and was a talented rugby union player.

== Playing career ==
=== Early years ===
In 2019, Armstrong joined the Redcliffe Dolphins, playing for their Mal Meninga Cup and Hastings Deering Colts teams.

In 2020, Armstrong signed with the Newcastle Knights and was set to play for their Jersey Flegg Cup team before the season was cancelled due to COVID-19. He returned to Queensland, playing for the Goondiwindi Boars in the Toowoomba Rugby League, where he scored a hat trick in their 2021 Grand Final win over Highfields.

In 2022, Armstrong returned to Newcastle, playing for their Jersey Flegg and NSW Cup teams. In 2023, he began training with the club's NRL squad and was named on the extended bench for their round 27 match against the St. George Illawarra Dragons.

=== 2024 ===
In 2024, Armstrong joined Newcastle's NRL top 30 squad on a one-year contract. In round 8 of the 2024 NRL season, he made his NRL debut for Newcastle against the Dolphins, scoring a try on debut.

In round 11, Armstrong scored a hat-trick in the clubs 28-24 victory over the Gold Coast. On 11 June, Armstrong handed in a transfer request stating he wished to leave the Newcastle club.

In June, it was revealed that Armstrong would be joining English Super League side Leigh Leopards in 2025 on a three-year deal.

=== 2025 ===
Armstrong made his club debut for Leigh in round 1 of the 2025 Super League season against rivals Wigan. Leigh would win the match 1-0 in extra-time after the game finished 0-0 at the conclusion of 80 minutes. Armstrong played only eleven matches for Leigh in the 2025 Super League season and did not feature in their playoffs campaign.
