= Daniel Saifiti =

Fiji international rugby league footballer

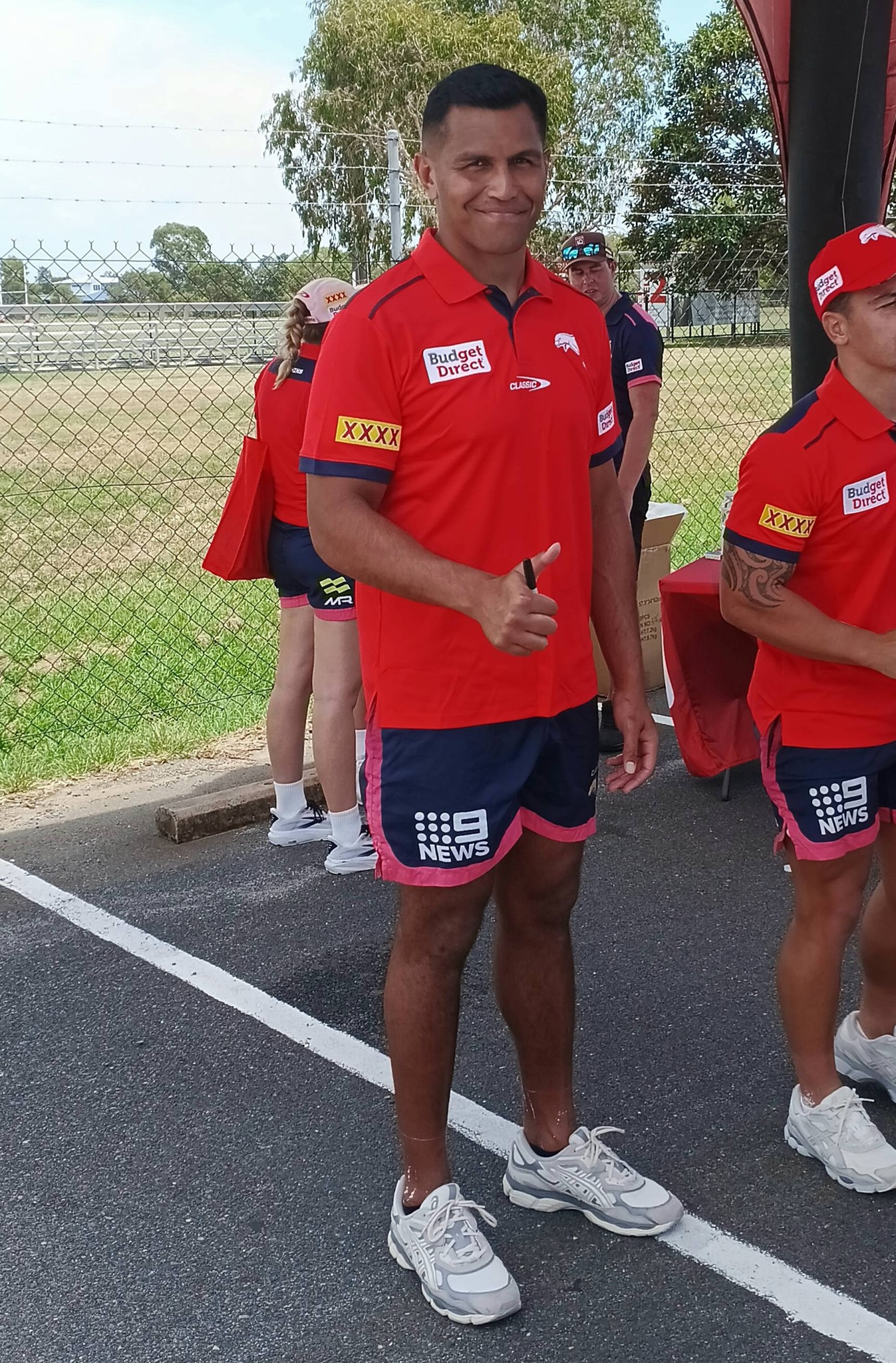

Personal information
- Full name: Daniel Saifiti
- Born: 1 May 1996 (age 30) Newcastle, New South Wales, Australia
- Height: 195 cm (6 ft 5 in)
- Weight: 121 kg (19 st 1 lb)

Playing information
- Position: Prop
Club
Years	Team	Pld	T	G	FG	P
2016–24	Newcastle Knights	183	19	0	0	76
2025	Dolphins	8	2	0	0	8
	Total	191	21	0	0	84
Representative
Years	Team	Pld	T	G	FG	P
2015–17	Fiji	3	1	0	0	4
2019–21	New South Wales	7	1	0	0	4
- Source: As of 31 January 2026
- Relatives: Jacob Saifiti (brother)

Daniel Saifiti (born 1 May 1996) is a former Fiji international rugby league footballer who played as a prop for the Newcastle Knights and the Dolphins in the National Rugby League.

Saifiti has also played for New South Wales in the State of Origin series.

== Background ==
Saifiti was born in Newcastle, New South Wales, Australia. He is of Fijian and Samoan descent and moved to the Central Coast at a young age.

He played his junior rugby league for the Terrigal Sharks and The Entrance Tigers, before joining the Newcastle Knights in 2015.

Saifiti is the identical twin brother of Knights prop forward Jacob Saifiti.

== Playing career ==
=== Newcastle Knights (2015–2024) ===
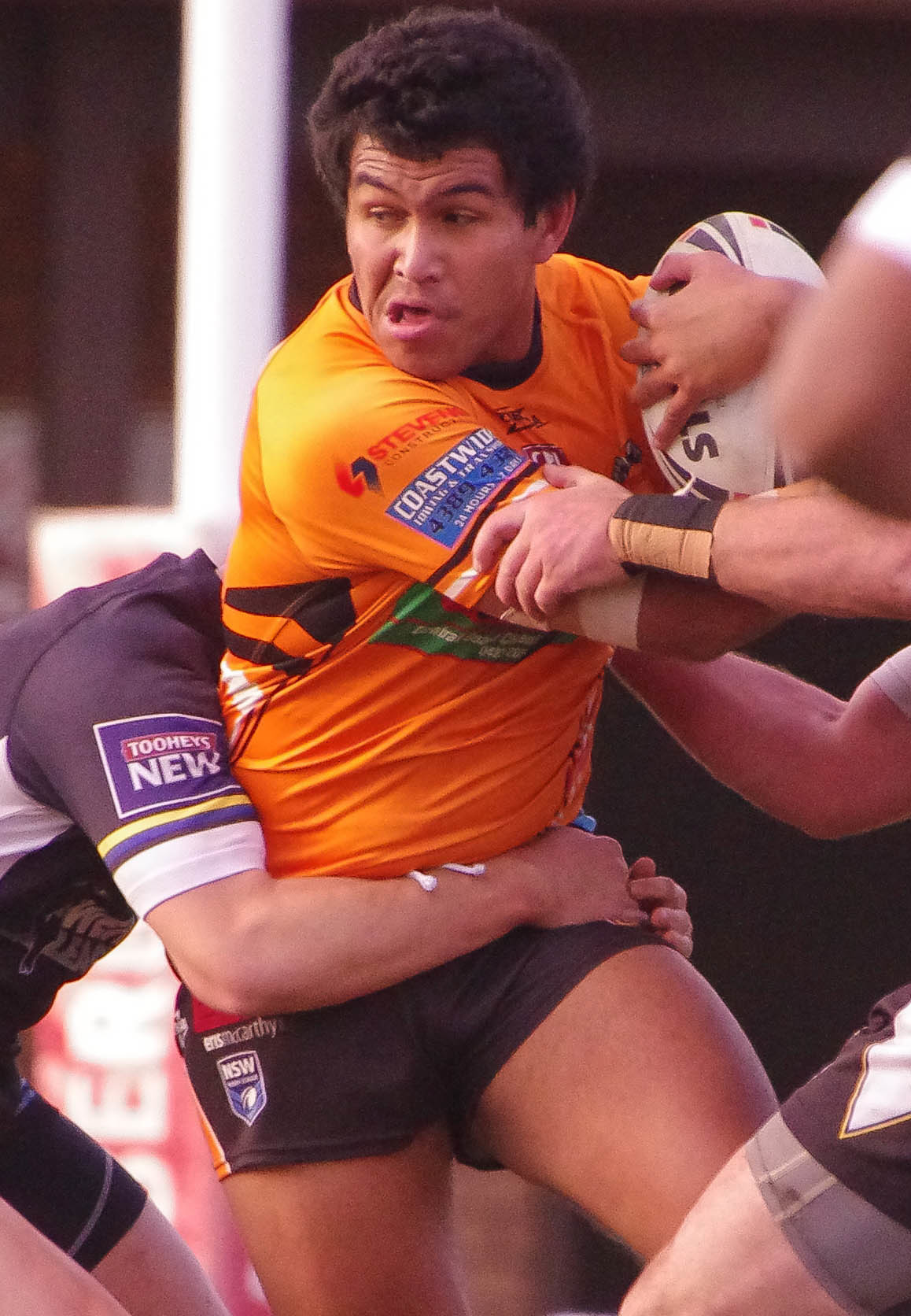
Saifiti in 2014

In 2015, Saifiti played for the Newcastle Knights' NYC team. On 2 May, he played for Fiji against Papua New Guinea, alongside his twin brother Jacob in the 2015 Melanesian Cup. During the year, he re-signed with the Newcastle club on a two-year contract.

In round 1 of the 2016 NRL season, Saifiti made his NRL debut for the Knights against the Gold Coast Titans, playing alongside his brother Jacob, becoming the first twins in Australian rugby league's 108-year history to debut together. He scored a try on debut. On 7 May, he again played for Fiji against Papua New Guinea in the 2016 Melanesian Cup. On 12 May, he and his brother extended their contracts with the Knights from the end of 2017 until the end of 2018. In his 8th game of first-grade, he ran for a game-high 237 metres against the Wests Tigers. Saifiti finished his debut season with Newcastle making 20 appearances as the club finished last on the table.

Saifiti played 23 games for the Knights in the 2017 season, before having his contract extended until the end of 2020. Newcastle would finish the year on the bottom of the table for a third straight season.

Saifiti played 21 games for Newcastle in the 2018 NRL season as the club finished 11th on the table.

Saifiti was selected in the starting side for Game 2 of the 2019 State of Origin series.

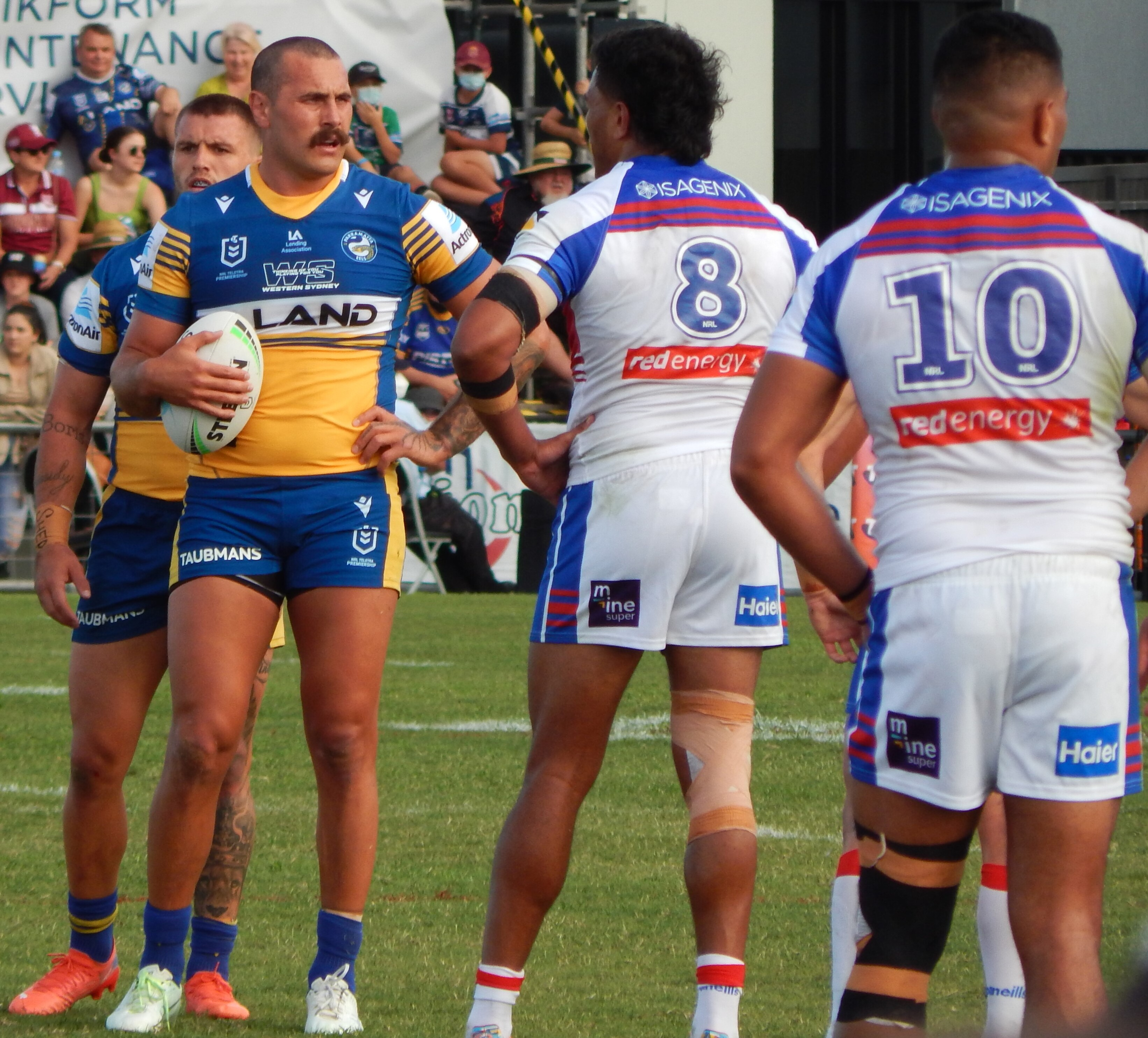
Jacob Saifiti (8) and Daniel Saifiti (10) wait as Reagan Campbell Gillard waits to play the ball in 2021

Saifiti was retained for Game 3 of the 2019 State of Origin series which was won by New South Wales 26-20 at ANZ Stadium. It was the first time since 2005 that New South Wales had won back to back series.

At club level, he played 21 games for Newcastle as the club finished a disappointing 11th on the table after being expected by many to qualify for the finals.

He was selected for New South Wales in the 2020 State of Origin series. He played in all three games as New South Wales suffered a 2-1 series defeat to Queensland.

For round 1 of the 2021 NRL season, Saifiti was announced as a Knights co-captain alongside Jayden Brailey.

He was selected for game one of the 2021 State of Origin series. Saifiti scored his first try for New South Wales in game one as the Blues defeated Queensland 50-6. Saifiti played in the first two games during the series but was ruled out of the third due to injury. New South Wales went on to win the series 2-1.

Saifiti caused a shock when he ruled himself of World Cup selection for Fiji, citing covid and injury issues earlier in the year as the reason. Saifiti played 19 games for Newcastle in the 2022 NRL season as the club missed the finals finishing 14th on the table.

Saifiti played a total of 22 games for Newcastle in the 2023 NRL season as the club finished 5th on the table. Saifiti played in Newcastle's golden point extra-time victory over Canberra in week one of the finals.

=== Dolphins (2025) ===
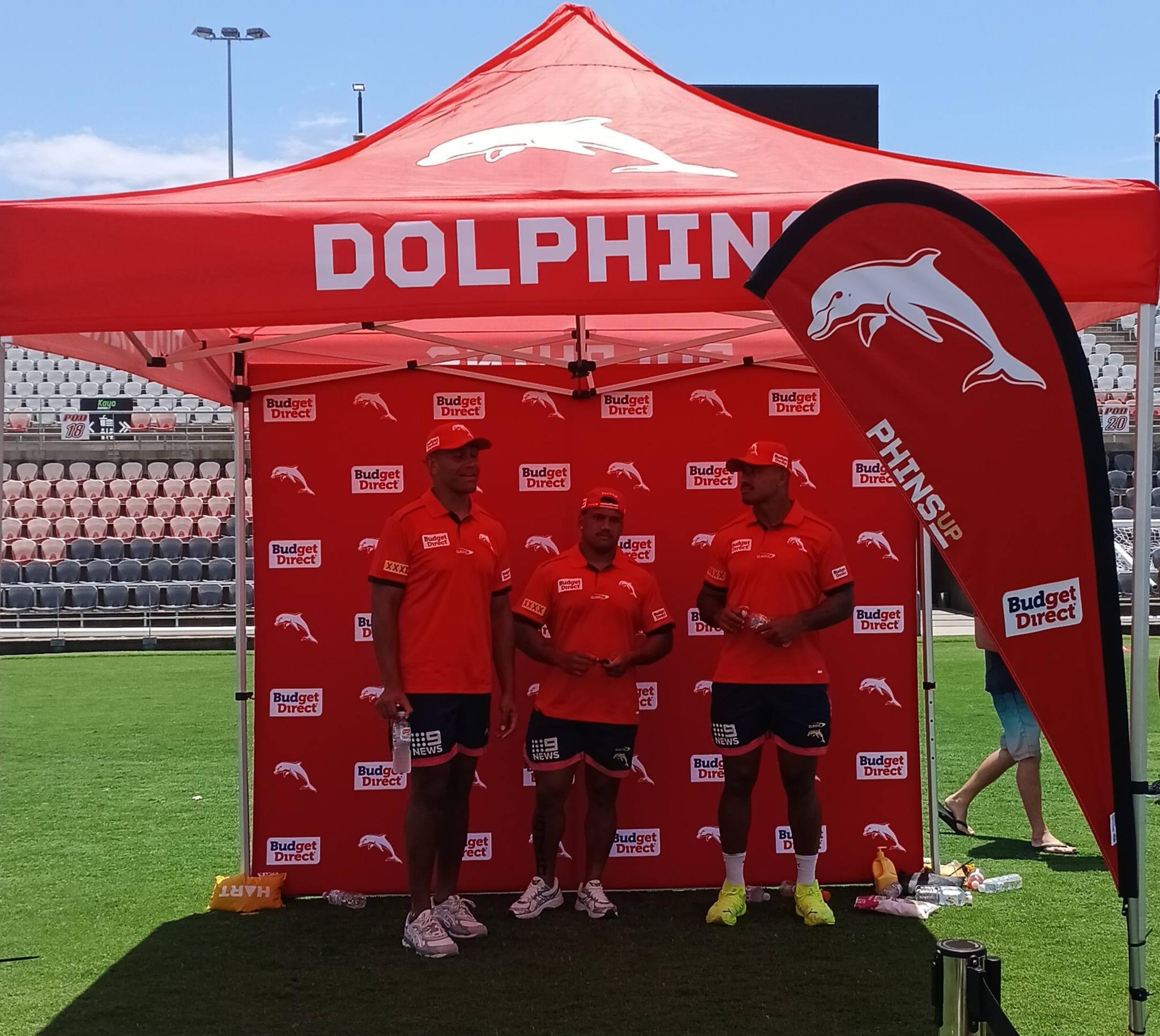
Daniel Saifiti, John Fineanganofo and Felise Kaufusi in January 2026

Late in the 2024 season, Saifiti was given permission by the Knights to negotiate with a new club for the 2025 season. In October, he signed a three-year contract with the Dolphins.

On 4 May 2026, Saifiti announced his immediate medical retirement from the NRL after failing to overcome a shoulder injury sustained in the previous season, the injury failed to respond to treatment and the damage was "pretty bad.", the Dolphins confirmed he would transition to a role within the club.

== Statistics ==
Year	Team	Games	Tries	Pts
2016	Newcastle Knights	20	1	4
2017	Newcastle Knights	23	2	8
2018	Newcastle Knights	21	3	12
2019	Newcastle Knights	21		
2020	Newcastle Knights	14	3	12
2021	Newcastle Knights	20	3	12
2022	Newcastle Knights	19	2	8
2023	Newcastle Knights	22	2	8
2024	Newcastle Knights	23	3	12
2025	Dolphins	8	2	8
	Totals	191	21	84
