= Tyson Frizell =

Australia, Tonga, and Wales international rugby league footballer

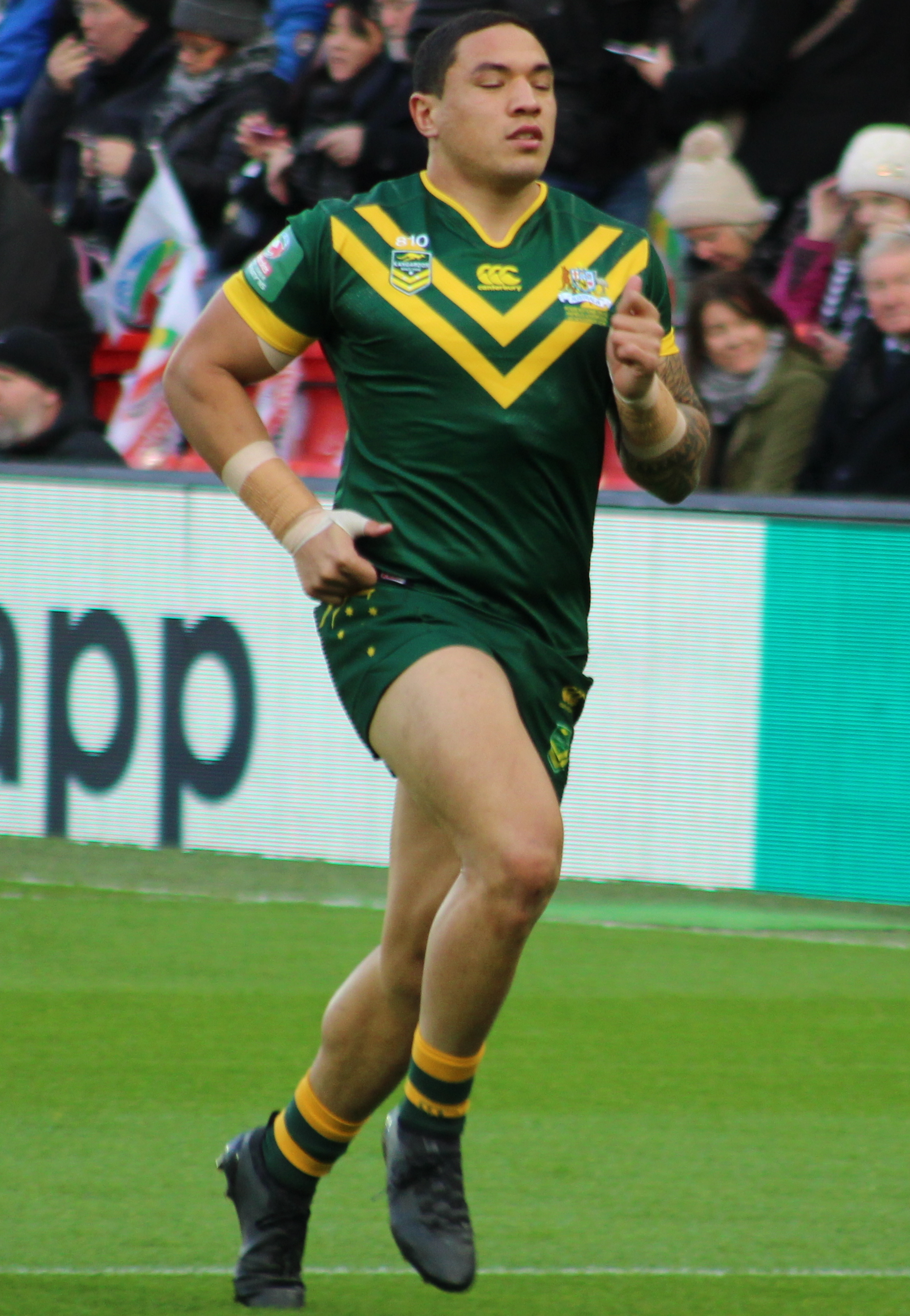

Personal information
- Full name: Tyson Lomano David Frizell
- Born: 9 October 1991 (age 35) Wollongong, New South Wales, Australia
- Height: 183 cm (6 ft 0 in)
- Weight: 108 kg (17 st 0 lb)

Playing information
- Position: Second-row, Lock, Prop
Club
Years	Team	Pld	T	G	FG	P
2011–12	Cronulla Sharks	12	2	0	0	8
2013–20	St. George Illawarra	165	23	0	0	92
2021–	Newcastle Knights	129	17	0	0	68
	Total	306	42	0	0	168
Representative
Years	Team	Pld	T	G	FG	P
2011–13	Wales	5	0	0	0	0
2015–16	NSW Country Origin	2	0	0	0	0
2016–23	New South Wales	16	3	0	0	12
2016–19	Australia	14	4	0	0	16
2019	Prime Minister's XIII	1	0	0	0	0
2019	Australia 9s	4	1	0	0	5
2023–	Tonga	6	1	0	0	4
- Source: As of 16 November 2026

Tyson Lomano David Frizell (born 9 October 1991) is a professional rugby league footballer who usually plays as a second-rower for the Wests Tigers in the National Rugby League. Frizell has the distinction of appearing for three different national teams. (Note: One source describes Frizell as the first player to achieve this feat. The source discounts several players who represented Great Britain, England, and another Home Nation, such as Jim Sullivan, Leslie White, Emlyn Jenkins, Gus Risman, Garreth Carvell (Wales), and Joe Philbin (Ireland).) He represented Wales in the 2011 Four Nations and 2013 World Cup, then Australia between 2016 and 2019, including the 2017 World Cup, and most recently Tonga.

Prior to joining the Newcastle Knights, he played for the Cronulla-Sutherland Sharks and St. George Illawarra Dragons and Newcastle Knights in the NRL. He has also represented NSW Country Origin, New South Wales in the State of Origin series and the Prime Minister's XIII.

== Background ==
Frizell was born in Wollongong, in the Illawarra region of New South Wales, Australia to a Welsh father and Tongan mother. Tyson's adoptive brother Shannon is a rugby union player for the Highlanders in Super Rugby and the All Blacks internationally. Like Shannon, Tyson played rugby union growing up.

== Playing career ==
=== 2009 ===
He played his junior rugby league with the Corrimal Cougars, while also playing his junior rugby union with the Woonona Shamrocks club. Frizell attended the Illawarra Sports High School in Wollongong on the NSW South Coast. In 2009 he was selected as a centre for the Australian Rugby Union Schoolboys Tour of the United Kingdom and Ireland.

=== 2010 & 2011 ===
Shortly after returning from the tour, Frizell announced that he would be joining the Cronulla-Sutherland Sharks NYC squad for the 2010 season. In the 2010/11 seasons Frizell played 42 NYC games with the Sharks. While in his second NYC year, Frizell made his NRL début for the Cronulla-Sutherland Sharks on 29 July 2011 against the Brisbane Broncos at Suncorp Stadium, following up with a second NRL appearance in 2011 against the Sydney Roosters. At the conclusion of the 2011 season, Frizell joined the Welsh Rugby League team, and played two tests in the Gillette Four Nations Series.

In his first full NRL season in 2012, Frizell played 10 games for Cronulla but despite some good performances, failed to hold down a regular back-row spot in the starting 17.

=== 2012 & 2013 ===
On 12 April 2012, Frizell announced he would joining the St. George Illawarra Dragons on a two-year deal beginning November 2012. His debut for the club occurred on 10 March 2013 against the Melbourne Storm at AAMI Park, Melbourne. In the 2013 season Frizell played 22 games for St. George and was credited as being one of the few shining lights in a team that endured a very poor season.

At the conclusion of the 2013 NRL season, Frizell re-joined the Welsh team and played another 3 tests in the 2013 Rugby League World Cup held in the United Kingdom.

Upon returning from World Cup duties, St. George Illawarra announced on 11 December 2013 that Frizell had re-signed with the club at least until the end of the 2017 season.

=== 2016 ===
Frizell enjoyed a breakout season in 2016 earning both a State of Origin début and an Australian début.

=== 2017 ===
Frizell was selected in the Australian side for the 2017 rugby league world cup. Frizell came off the bench in Australia's 6–0 victory over England in the final.

=== 2018 ===
In 2018, Frizell was selected to play for New South Wales in the 2018 State of Origin series. Frizell played in all three games as The Blues won the series 2–1. Frizell was part of the St George side which qualified for the finals in 2018. In week one, St George upset Brisbane at Suncorp Stadium winning the match 48–18. The following week, St George were eliminated from the finals series losing 13–12 to South Sydney.

=== 2019 ===
In Round 1 2019, Frizell suffered a freak injury in St George's defeat against the North Queensland Cowboys. Frizell had attempted to tackle North Queensland player Jordan Kahu but suffered a ruptured testicle after being hit in the groin by accident. Frizell later underwent surgery and was ruled out for 4–6 weeks.

Frizell was selected to play in the 2019 State of Origin series and featured in all 3 matches as New South Wales won the series 2–1. It was the first time since 2005 that New South Wales had won back to back series.

Frizell made a total of 21 appearances for St. George in the 2019 NRL season as the club endured one of their worst ever seasons finishing in 15th place just above the last placed Gold Coast.

On 30 September 2019, Frizell was named at second row in the Australia PM XIII side. On 7 October, Frizell was named in the Australian side for the 2019 Rugby League World Cup 9s and the upcoming Oceania Cup fixtures.

=== 2020 ===
In March 2020, it was revealed that Frizell had accepted a three-year contract with the Newcastle Knights starting in 2021, however the contract wasn't immediately registered by the NRL due to the ongoing uncertainty around the competition during the COVID-19 pandemic.

Frizell made a total of 20 appearances for St. George in the 2020 NRL season, in his final game for the club he scored two tries during their 30–22 victory over Melbourne at Kogarah Oval.

=== 2021 ===
Frizell played 19 games for Newcastle in the 2021 NRL season including the club's elimination finals loss against Parramatta.

=== 2022 ===
Frizell played 21 games for Newcastle in the 2022 NRL season scoring three tries as the club missed the finals finishing 14th on the table.

=== 2023 ===
On 22 May, Frizell was selected by New South Wales for game one of the 2023 State of Origin series. Frizell played in the opening two games of the series but wasn't retained for game three. Frizell played a total of 22 games for Newcastle in the 2023 NRL season as the club finished 5th on the table. Frizell played in both finals games as Newcastle were eliminated in the second week of the finals by the New Zealand Warriors.

In October 2023, Frizell made his test debut (and scored a try) for Tonga in the opening match of Tonga's tour to England becoming the first player to represent three different nations at international level.

=== 2024 ===
Frizell played 19 games for Newcastle in the 2024 NRL season as the club finished 8th and qualified for the finals. They were eliminated in the first week of the finals by North Queensland. On 21 November, Frizell announced that he was retiring from representative football to focus solely on playing club football.

=== 2025 ===
Frizell has an option in his contract to extend past 2024 whilst it was never announced that he activated it, he has been seen training with the first team squad during the Newcastle Knights 2025 pre-season suggesting he did in fact activate it. On 11 August, the Newcastle outfit announced that Frizell had re-signed with the club for a further year. Frizell played 23 games for Newcastle in the 2025 NRL season as the club finished with the wooden spoon.

=== 2026 ===
On 12 October 2026, the Wests Tigers announced that they had signed Frizell for the 2027 season. Frizell said, "Leadership is something people at the Tigers want me to do. I don’t know if leadership comes naturally to me, but it's come with time in the game. It's a younger squad, and I need to earn the respect once I get there. I need to lead by example, and that needs to be earned through the pre-season."

== Statistics ==
Season	Team	Games	Tries	Pts
2011	Cronulla-Sutherland	2		
2012	Cronulla-Sutherland	10	2	8
2013	St. George Illawarra Dragons	22	2	8
2014	St. George Illawarra Dragons	15	3	12
2015	St. George Illawarra Dragons	21	4	16
2016	St. George Illawarra Dragons	21	3	12
2017	St. George Illawarra Dragons	22	1	4
2018	St. George Illawarra Dragons	23	5	20
2019	St. George Illawarra Dragons	22	2	8
2020	St. George Illawarra Dragons	20	3	12
2021	Newcastle Knights	19	3	12
2022	Newcastle Knights	21	3	12
2023	Newcastle Knights	22	4	16
2024	Newcastle Knights	19	5	20
2025	Newcastle Knights	23		
2026	Newcastle Knights	25	2	8
2027	Wests Tigers			
	Totals	306	42	168

source;
