= List of Newcastle Knights players =

This article lists all rugby league footballers who have played first-grade for the Newcastle Knights in the National Rugby League.

Notes:

- Debut:
  - Players are listed in the order of their debut game with the club.
  - Players that debuted in the same game are added alphabetically, however there are exceptions at times, such as Tom Cant being a late inclusion into his debut game, after Dylan Lucas and Ryan Rivett were already confirmed to be debuting and having their numbers assigned already.
- Appearances: Newcastle Knights games only, not a total of their career games. For example, Jeremy Smith has played a career total of 214 first-grade games but of those, 75 were at Newcastle.
- Previous Club: refers to the previous first-grade rugby league club (NRL or Super League) the player played at and does not refer to any junior club, Rugby Union club or a rugby league club he was signed to but never played at.
- Current players are indicated in bold text for their Knights career years.
- The statistics in this table are correct as of the 2026 NRL season.

== List of players ==
Cap no.	Name	Nationality	Knights career	Debut round	Previous club	Position	Appearances	Tries	Goals	Field goals	Points	Age of debut
1.	David Boyd	(Australia)	1988–93	Rd. 1	Canterbury-Bankstown Bulldogs	Second-row	114	8	1	0	34	21
2.	Tony Butterfield	(Australia)	1988–00	Rd. 1	Penrith Panthers	Prop	229	27	0	0	108	22
3.	Glen Frendo	(Australia)	1988–90	Rd. 1	Canterbury-Bankstown Bulldogs	Wing	47	2	0	0	8	23
4.	Gavin Hanrahan	(Australia)	1988	Rd. 1	Balmain Tigers	Centre	9	0	0	0	0	23
5.	Michael McKiernan	(Australia)	1988–89	Rd. 1	Debut	Second-row	34	1	19	0	42	24
6.	Glenn Miller	(Australia)	1988–92	Rd. 1	Penrith Panthers	Centre	84	11	0	0	44	24
7.	Brian Quinton	(Australia)	1988–89	Rd. 1	St. George Dragons	Wing	28	6	16	0	56	24
8.	Sam Stewart	(New Zealand)	1988–92	Rd. 1	Debut	Second-row	81	7	0	0	28	25
9.	Robbie Tew	(Australia)	1988	Rd. 1	Debut	Halfback	7	0	14	0	28	26
10.	David Thorne	(Australia)	1988–89, 1991	Rd. 1	Debut	Prop	36	1	0	0	4	22
11.	Tony Townsend	(Australia)	1988–90	Rd. 1	St. George Dragons	Hooker	25	2	0	0	8	26
12.	Steve Walters	(Australia)	1988–91	Rd. 1	Debut	Halfback	23	3	0	0	12	20
13.	Rod Whitaker	(Australia)	1988	Rd. 1	Debut	Wing	5	0	0	0	0	24
14.	Scott Carter	(Australia)	1988–91	Rd. 1	Debut	Hooker	42	4	0	0	16	?
15.	Peter Malcolm	(Australia)	1988	Rd. 2	Debut	Hooker	2	0	0	0	0	?
16.	George Mann	(New Zealand) (Tonga)	1988	Rd. 1	Debut	Second-row	8	0	0	0	0	22
17.	Tea Ropati	(New Zealand) (Samoa)	1988	Rd. 1	Debut	Centre	2	0	1	0	2	23
18.	Steve Fulmer	(Australia)	1988–91	Rd. 2	Debut	Halfback	64	14	0	1	57	21
19.	Tony Kemp	(New Zealand)	1988–93	Rd. 3	Debut	Centre	87	20	0	1	81	20
20.	Scott Seamer	(Australia)	1988	Rd. 3	Debut	?	2	0	0	0	0	?
21.	Brett Shore	(Australia)	1988	Rd. 3	Debut	Prop	11	0	0	0	0	?
22.	Troy Clarke	(Australia)	1988–89	Rd. 4	Debut	Wing	7	0	1	0	2	20
23.	James Goulding	(New Zealand)	1988–90	Rd. 4	Debut	Second-row	29	0	0	0	0	22
24.	Jeff Doyle	(Australia)	1988–91	Rd. 5	Debut	Centre	71	20	19	0	118	20
25.	Robbie McCormack	(Australia)	1988–96	Rd. 6	Debut	Hooker	154	17	0	0	68	23
26.	Marc Glanville	(Australia)	1988–97	Rd. 6	St. George Dragons	Lock	188	17	0	1	69	21
27.	Michael Reid	(Australia)	1988–89	Rd. 7	Canterbury-Bankstown Bulldogs	Hooker	3	0	0	0	0	?
28.	Greg Hayward	(Australia)	1988	Rd. 9	Debut	Second-row	3	0	0	0	0	?
29.	Graeme Foster	(Australia)	1988	Rd. 10	Manly Warringah Sea Eagles	Wing	1	0	0	0	0	?
30.	Adrian Shelford	(New Zealand)	1988	Rd. 10	Debut	Prop	5	0	0	0	0	24
31.	Charlie McAlister	(New Zealand)	1988	Rd. 12	Debut	Centre	1	0	0	0	0	25
32.	Darren Meredith	(Australia)	1988	Rd. 16	Canberra Raiders	Wing	2	0	0	0	0	25
33.	John Crooks	(Australia)	1988	Rd. 17	Debut	?	2	0	0	0	0	?
34.	Adrian Bubb	(Australia)	1988	Rd. 18	Debut	Prop	1	0	0	0	0	?
35.	Paul Harragon	(Australia)	1988–99	Rd. 18	Debut	Prop	169	19	0	0	76	19
36.	Darren Forward	(Australia)	1988–89	Rd. 22	Debut	Prop	4	0	0	0	0	?
37.	Michael Hagan	(Australia)	1989–93	Rd. 1	Canterbury-Bankstown Bulldogs	Five-eighth	111	16	0	3	67	24
38.	Peter Johnston	(Australia)	1989–91	Rd. 1	Sydney Roosters	Prop	45	5	16	0	52	25
39.	Mark Sargent	(Australia)	1989–95	Rd. 1	Canterbury-Bankstown Bulldogs	Prop	126	18	0	0	72	24
40.	Gary Wurth	(Australia)	1989–91	Rd. 1	Sydney Roosters	Fullback	39	8	0	5	37	27
41.	John Allanson	(Australia)	1989–90	Rd. 1	Western Suburbs Magpies	Wing	14	1	0	0	4	21
42.	Arnold Krewanty	(Papua New Guinea)	1989	Rd. 1	Debut	Wing	2	0	0	0	0	?
43.	Dairi Kovae	(Papua New Guinea)	1989	Rd. 2	North Sydney Bears	Wing	8	1	0	0	4	?
44.	Dean Carney	(Australia)	1989	Rd. 4	Illawarra Steelers	Wing	2	0	1	0	2	27
45.	Richard Clarke	(France)	1989	Rd. 17	St. George Dragons	Prop	1	1	0	0	4	27
46.	Ashley Gordon	(Australia)	1989–92, 1995	Rd. 17	Debut	Wing	71	38	56	2	266	20
47.	Tony Herman	(Australia)	1989–95	Rd. 21	Debut	Wing	48	7	0	0	28	22
48.	Paul Marquet	(Australia)	1990–96, 2001	Rd. 1	Debut	Second-row	137	9	0	0	36	20
49.	David Mullane	(Australia)	1990–93	Rd. 1	Debut	Hooker	61	2	0	0	8	20
50.	Shane Christensen	(Australia)	1990	Rd. 2	Debut	Hooker	3	0	0	0	0	20
51.	Adrian Brunker	(Australia)	1990–93	Rd. 4	Debut	Centre	57	18	36	0	144	19
52.	Marty Crequer	(New Zealand)	1990	Rd. 7	Debut	Wing	11	0	25	0	50	24
53.	Matthew Rodwell	(Australia)	1990, 1992–93	Rd. 7	Debut	Halfback	44	7	0	2	30	18
54.	Graham Settree	(Australia)	1990	Rd. 7	Penrith Panthers	Second-row	2	0	0	0	0	?
55.	Todd Anderson	(Australia)	1990	Rd. 16	Debut	Forwards	1	0	0	0	0	?
56.	Max Chapman	(Australia)	1990–91, 1993	Rd. 16	Debut	Hooker	17	1	0	0	4	?
57.	Steve Linnane	(Australia)	1991	Rd. 1	St. George Dragons	Halfback	18	2	0	0	8	26
58.	Mike McLean	(Australia)	1991	Rd. 1	Sydney Roosters	Second-row	17	1	0	0	4	28
59.	Jason Hoogerwerf	(Australia)	1991	Rd. 1	St. George Dragons	Prop	5	0	0	0	0	24
60.	John Schuster	(Samoa) (New Zealand)	1991–93	Rd. 1	Debut	Centre	47	16	101	0	266	27
61.	Dave Woods	(Australia)	1991	Rd. 3	Canberra Raiders	Prop	12	0	0	0	0	24
62.	Wayne Richards	(Australia)	1991–94, 1997–98	Rd. 4	Debut	Second-row	51	4	0	0	16	20
63.	Rod Shoesmith	(Australia)	1991	Rd. 7	Debut	Wing	4	1	0	0	4	?
64.	Steve Crowe	(Australia)	1991–95, 1997–98	Rd. 8	Debut	Second-row	50	1	0	0	4	22
65.	Jason Edwards	(Australia)	1991–92	Rd. 9	Debut	Wing	5	1	0	0	4	?
66.	Brad Godden	(Australia)	1991–96	Rd. 14	Debut	Fullback	89	17	0	0	68	21
67.	Peter Graham	(Australia)	1991	Rd. 22	Debut	Prop	1	0	0	0	0	?
68.	Robbie O'Davis	(Australia)	1992–04	Rd. 1	Debut	Fullback	223	78	45	1	403	19
69.	Jamie Ainscough	(Australia)	1992–96	Rd. 5	Western Suburbs Magpies	Centre	87	47	4	2	198	19
70.	Adam Muir	(Australia)	1992–97	Rd. 8	Debut	Second-row	99	29	0	0	116	20
71.	Shane Mackley	(Australia)	1992	Rd. 12	Debut	Wing	4	1	0	0	4	?
72.	Rodney Howe	(Australia)	1992–93	Rd. 13	Debut	Prop	10	1	0	0	4	19
73.	Matthew Johns	(Australia)	1992–00	Rd. 17	Debut	Five-eighth	176	22	0	9	97	20
74.	Jason Martin	(Australia)	1993–94	Rd. 1	North Sydney Bears	Halfback	16	2	0	0	8	22
75.	Andrew Johns	(Australia)	1993–07	Rd. 6	Debut	Halfback	249	80	917	22	2176	18
76.	Logan Campbell	(New Zealand) (Scotland)	1993	Rd. 6	Debut	Centre	1	0	0	0	0	21
77.	David Smith	(Australia)	1993–94	Rd. 7	Sydney Roosters	Centre	13	2	0	0	8	25
78.	Tim Maddison	(Australia)	1993–95, 2003	Rd. 9	Debut	Second-row	14	0	0	0	0	19
79.	Andrew Tangata-Toa	(Tonga)	1993, 1995–96	Rd. 19	Debut	Wing	10	0	0	0	0	19
80.	Nathan Barnes	(Australia)	1994–95	Rd. 1	Penrith Panthers	Centre	41	18	0	0	72	18
81.	Russell Wyer	(Australia)	1994	Rd. 1	Western Suburbs Magpies	Centre	19	11	0	0	44	31
82.	Darren Treacy	(Australia)	1994–96	Rd. 1	Debut	Second-row	60	15	0	0	60	22
83.	Robbie Ross	(Australia)	1994–95	Rd. 4	Debut	Fullback	20	4	0	0	16	19
84.	Michael Eagar	(Australia) (Republic of Ireland)	1994–95	Rd. 7	Debut	Five-eighth	11	2	0	0	8	20
85.	Stuart Collins	(Australia)	1994–95	Rd. 10	Debut	?	9	0	0	0	0	?
86.	Bill Peden	(Australia)	1994–02	Rd. 11	Debut	Lock	190	42	35	0	238	24
87.	Shane Vincent	(Australia)	1994	Rd. 19	Penrith Panthers	Centre	3	1	0	0	4	21
88.	Brett Grogan	(Australia)	1994–98	Rd. 22	Debut	Wing	62	26	0	0	104	21
89.	Craig Kimmorley	(Australia)	1995	Rd. 4	Debut	Halfback	2	0	0	0	0	20
90.	Chris Joynt	(England) (Republic of Ireland)	1995	Rd. 12	Debut	Second-row	7	1	0	0	4	23
91.	Owen Craigie	(Australia)	1995–99	Rd. 15	Debut	Centre	76	32	7	0	142	17
92.	Brett Kimmorley	(Australia)	1995–96	Rd. 17	Debut	Halfback	6	1	0	0	4	18
93.	Scott Conley	(Australia)	1995–97, 1999	Rd. 19	Debut	Second-row	39	5	0	0	20	22
94.	Darren Albert	(Australia)	1996–01	Rd. 2	Debut	Wing	89	65	0	0	260	20
95.	Glenn Grief	(Australia)	1996, 1998–01	Rd. 2	Western Suburbs Magpies	Prop	96	12	1	0	50	22
96.	Andrew Hodge	(Australia)	1996	Rd. 2	Gold Coast Chargers	Wing	2	0	0	0	0	?
97.	Lee Jackson	(England)	1996–98	Rd. 2	South Sydney Rabbitohs	Hooker	58	3	0	0	12	27
98.	Matthew Gidley	(Australia)	1996–06	Rd. 4	Debut	Centre	221	68	0	1	273	18
99.	Keith Beauchamp	(Australia)	1996	Rd. 5	Illawarra Steelers	Wing	18	9	0	0	36	28
100.	Troy Fletcher	(Australia)	1996–01	Rd. 7	Debut	Second-row	89	2	0	0	8	22
101.	Leo Dynevor	(Australia)	1997	Rd. 1	London Broncos	Halfback	19	8	36	0	104	23
102.	Adam MacDougall	(Australia)	1997–03, 2007–11	Rd. 1	Sydney Roosters	Centre	158	87	1	0	350	21
103.	Danny Buderus	(Australia)	1997–08, 2012–13	Rd. 3	Debut	Hooker	257	61	1	0	246	19
104.	Jason Moodie	(Australia)	1997–99	Rd. 2	Debut	Wing	54	28	0	0	112	22
105.	Brett Clements	(Australia)	1997–98	Rd. 5	Canterbury-Bankstown Bulldogs	Hooker	19	1	0	0	4	24
106.	Evan Cochrane	(Australia)	1997–98	Rd. 6	London Broncos	Wing	21	4	0	0	16	24
107.	Jarrod O'Doherty	(Australia)	1997–98, 2001–02	Rd. 6	Debut	Second-row	28	2	0	0	8	19
108.	Mark Hughes	(Australia)	1997–05	Rd. 9	Debut	Centre	161	66	0	0	264	20
109.	Daniel Smailes	(Australia)	1997–00	Rd. 13	Debut	Second-row	21	1	0	0	4	23
110.	Neil Piccinelli	(Australia)	1998	Rd. 1	Hunter Mariners	Second-row	26	6	0	0	24	31
111.	Peter Shiels	(Australia)	1998–00	Rd. 1	Perth Reds	Second-row	61	12	0	0	48	24
112.	Jason Allen	(Australia)	1998	Rd. 8	Debut	Fullback	2	0	0	0	0	?
113.	Mick Jenkins	(Australia) (Wales)	1998	Rd. 11	Debut	Hooker	3	0	0	0	0	25
114.	David Lomax	(New Zealand)	1998–99	Rd. 13	Paris Saint-Germain RL	Second-row	29	0	0	0	0	27
115.	Aaron Grainger	(Australia)	1998	Rd. 16	Debut	Halfback	2	0	0	0	0	20
116.	Sean Rudder	(Australia)	1998–03	Rd. 17	Debut	Five-eighth	131	21	0	0	84	19
117.	Brock Mueller	(Australia)	1998–99	Rd. 23	Debut	Second-row	6	1	0	0	4	20
118.	Grant Stuart	(Australia)	1998–99	Rd. 24	Balmain Tigers	Centre	2	2	0	0	8	23
119.	Lenny Beckett	(Australia)	1999–00	Rd. 1	Debut	Wing	27	13	0	0	52	18
120.	Steve Walters	(Australia)	1999	Rd. 1	North Queensland Cowboys	Hooker	7	2	0	0	8	33
121.	Clinton O'Brien	(Australia)	1999–02	Rd. 1	Gold Coast Chargers	Prop	59	3	0	0	12	25
122.	Jason Temu	(New Zealand) (Cook Islands)	1999–00	Rd. 2	Hull F.C.	Prop	3	0	0	0	0	26
123.	Greg Smith	(United States)	1999	Rd. 3	Debut	Wing	1	0	0	0	0	26
124.	Chris Mandalidis	(Australia)	1999	Rd. 8	Debut	Prop	6	0	0	0	0	24
125.	Shane O'Grady	(Australia)	1999	Rd. 8	Penrith Panthers	Prop	1	0	0	0	0	29
126.	Steve Simpson	(Australia)	1999–10	Rd. 9	Debut	Second-row	216	32	0	0	128	19
127.	Justin Holbrook	(Australia)	1999–00	Rd. 12	Debut	Halfback	5	2	10	0	28	23
128.	Timana Tahu	(Australia)	1999–04, 2012–14	Rd. 12	Debut	Centre	126	93	2	0	376	18
129.	Paul Rauhihi	(New Zealand)	1999–00	Rd. 17	Debut	Prop	19	3	0	0	12	25
130.	Ben Kennedy	(Australia)	2000–04	Rd. 1	Canberra Raiders	Second-row	86	29	0	0	116	25
131.	Matt Parsons	(Australia)	2000–04	Rd. 1	South Sydney Rabbitohs	Prop	106	1	0	0	4	26
132.	David Fairleigh	(Australia)	2000	Rd. 1	North Sydney Bears	Prop	26	1	0	0	4	29
133.	Justin Ryder	(Australia)	2000–02	Rd. 1	Debut	Wing	27	9	0	0	36	19
134.	Ben Donaldson	(Australia)	2000–01	Rd. 10	Debut	Hooker	9	1	0	0	4	21
135.	Ben MacDougall	(Australia)	2000	Rd. 10	Western Suburbs Magpies	Wing	2	0	0	0	0	22
136.	Daniel Abraham	(Australia)	2000–07	Rd. 14	Debut	Second-row	100	16	65	0	194	19
137.	Josh Perry	(Australia)	2000–07	Rd. 17	Debut	Prop	142	15	0	0	60	19
138.	Julian Bailey	(Australia)	2001–02	Rd. 1	Sydney Roosters	Second-row	39	9	0	0	36	22
139.	Clint Newton	(United States) (Australia)	2001–07, 2014–15	Rd. 7	Debut	Second-row	112	13	0	0	52	19
140.	Matt Jobson	(Australia)	2001–03	Rd. 15	Debut	Second-row	24	1	0	0	4	20
141.	John Morris	(Australia)	2001–02	Rd. 17	Debut	Hooker	31	11	0	0	44	20
142.	James Wynne	(Australia) (France)	2001–02	Rd. 23	Debut	Halfback	5	0	0	0	0	24
143.	Kurt Gidley	(Australia)	2001–15	Rd. 24	Debut	Fullback	251	80	452	4	1228	19
144.	Anthony Quinn	(Australia)	2002–06, 2013	Rd. 1	Debut	Wing	107	48	0	0	192	19
145.	Trent Estatheo	(Australia)	2002	Rd. 5	Debut	Prop	3	0	0	0	0	20
146.	Adam Woolnough	(Australia)	2002–07	Rd. 10	Debut	Prop	117	11	0	0	44	19
147.	Luke Quigley	(Australia)	2002–06	Rd. 15	Debut	Hooker	41	1	0	0	4	20
148.	Daniel Quinn	(Australia)	2002	Rd. 15	Northern Eagles	Prop	1	0	0	0	0	23
149.	Neil Sweeney	(Australia)	2002	Rd. 19	Debut	Wing	4	2	0	0	8	25
150.	Josh Smith	(Australia)	2003	Rd. 1	Northern Eagles	Wing	6	0	0	0	0	24
151.	Todd Bates	(Australia)	2003	Rd. 2	Debut	Halfback	4	1	0	0	4	20
152.	Matthew Kennedy	(Australia)	2003–05	Rd. 2	Debut	Prop	45	2	0	0	8	22
153.	Craig Hall	(Australia)	2003–05	Rd. 3	Debut	Wing	39	18	0	0	72	25
154.	Andrew Price	(Australia)	2003–05	Rd. 3	Debut	Second-row	34	2	0	0	8	20
155.	Reegan Tanner	(Australia)	2003–07	Rd. 7	Debut	Lock	83	3	3	0	18	20
156.	Blake Mueller	(Australia)	2003–05	Rd. 8	Debut	Lock	15	0	0	0	0	21
157.	Gavin Quinn	(Australia)	2003	Rd. 8	Debut	Wing	1	0	0	0	0	21
158.	Todd Lowrie	(Australia)	2003–06	Rd. 15	Debut	Second-row	57	7	0	0	28	19
159.	Michael Ennis	(Australia)	2003–04	Rd. 20	Debut	Lock	20	2	0	0	8	19
160.	Russell Richardson	(Australia)	2004	Rd. 1	South Sydney Rabbitohs	Centre	7	1	0	0	4	27
161.	David Seage	(Australia)	2004–06	Rd. 1	Debut	Fullback	16	5	0	0	20	24
162.	George Carmont	(New Zealand) (Samoa)	2004–07	Rd. 2	Debut	Centre	83	33	0	0	132	25
163.	Jamie Fitzgerald	(Australia)	2004	Rd. 4	South Sydney Rabbitohs	Hooker	5	0	0	0	0	25
164.	Michael Young	(Australia)	2004, 2007–08	Rd. 4	Debut	Hooker	20	0	0	0	0	20
165.	Riley Brown	(Australia)	2004–07	Rd. 4	Debut	Hooker	40	7	0	0	28	19
166.	Steve Witt	(Australia)	2004–05	Rd. 5	Debut	Five-eighth	19	5	0	0	20	20
167.	Daniel Tolar	(Australia)	2004–11	Rd. 12	Debut	Prop	101	5	0	0	20	21
168.	Kevin Henderson	(England) (Scotland)	2004	Rd. 14	Debut	Second-row	4	0	0	0	0	23
169.	Dane Tilse	(Australia)	2004	Rd. 15	Debut	Prop	3	0	0	0	0	19
170.	Kirk Reynoldson	(Australia)	2005–07	Rd. 1	Melbourne Storm	Lock	41	4	0	0	16	26
171.	Dustin Cooper	(Australia)	2005	Rd. 1	Melbourne Storm	Centre	14	3	0	0	12	23
172.	Kade Snowden	(Australia) (Italy)	2005, 2007, 2012–16	Rd. 1	Debut	Prop	92	4	0	0	16	18
173.	Matthew White	(Australia)	2005, 2007–08	Rd. 1	Debut	Prop	28	0	0	0	0	20
174.	Brad Tighe	(Australia)	2005–07	Rd. 2	Debut	Centre	44	20	2	0	84	20
175.	Brendan Worth	(Australia)	2005	Rd. 2	Debut	Prop	6	1	0	0	4	20
176.	Craig Smith	(New Zealand) (Australia)	2005–06	Rd. 4	Wigan Warriors	Prop	45	2	0	0	8	33
177.	Trent Salkeld	(Australia)	2005	Rd. 5	Debut	Wing	17	10	0	0	40	23
178.	Dane Campbell	(Australia)	2005	Rd. 9	Debut	Halfback	6	0	6	0	12	20
179.	Jarrod Mullen	(Australia)	2005–16	Rd. 10	Debut	Five-eighth	211	39	0	9	165	18
180.	Milton Thaiday	(Australia)	2005–07	Rd. 10	Debut	Fullback	29	14	0	0	56	25
181.	Kurt Hancock	(Australia)	2005	Rd. 14	Debut	Hooker	1	0	0	0	0	25
182.	Brian Carney	(Republic of Ireland)	2006	Rd. 1	Wigan Warriors	Wing	26	16	0	0	64	29
183.	Luke Davico	(Australia)	2006–07	Rd. 8	Canberra Raiders	Prop	18	2	0	0	8	32
184.	Chris Bailey	(Australia)	2006–08	Rd. 10	Debut	Five-eighth	29	10	0	0	40	23
185.	Nathan Hinton	(Australia)	2006–07	Rd. 15	Debut	Fullback	7	2	0	0	8	20
186.	James McManus	(Scotland) (Australia)	2007–15	Rd. 1	Debut	Wing	166	72	0	0	288	21
187.	Todd Polglase	(Australia)	2007	Rd. 1	South Sydney Rabbitohs	Wing	7	3	0	0	12	25
188.	Terence Seu Seu	(New Zealand) (Samoa)	2007	Rd. 1	Debut	Hooker	10	1	0	0	4	19
189.	Cory Paterson	(Australia)	2007–11	Rd. 2	Debut	Second-row	77	21	12	0	108	19
190.	Jesse Royal	(New Zealand)	2007–08	Rd. 7	Debut	Prop	29	3	0	0	12	27
191.	Mark Taufua	(Australia) (Samoa)	2007–11	Rd. 7	Debut	Prop	67	5	0	0	20	25
192.	Steve Gordon	(Australia)	2007	Rd. 8	Debut	Fullback	2	0	0	0	0	20
193.	Marvin Karawana	(New Zealand)	2007–09, 2011	Rd. 9	Debut	Second-row	34	1	0	0	4	20
194.	Cooper Vuna	(New Zealand) (Tonga)	2007–10	Rd. 11	New Zealand Warriors	Wing	54	35	0	0	140	20
195.	Luke MacDougall	(Australia)	2007	Rd. 12	St. George Illawarra Dragons	Centre	2	0	0	0	0	25
196.	Mitchell Sargent	(Australia)	2007	Rd. 12	North Queensland Cowboys	Prop	14	1	0	0	4	27
197.	Luke Walsh	(Australia)	2007	Rd. 12	Debut	Halfback	13	1	0	2	6	20
198.	Zeb Taia	(Australia) (Cook Islands) (New Zealand)	2007—12	Rd. 16	Parramatta Eels	Second-row	101	12	0	0	48	22
199.	Scott Dureau	(Australia)	2007–10	Rd. 22	Debut	Halfback	42	5	12	4	48	21
200.	Richard Fa'aoso	(Australia) (Tonga)	2008–12	Rd. 1	Parramatta Eels	Prop	99	12	0	0	48	23
201.	Matt Hilder	(Australia)	2008–13	Rd. 1	Gold Coast Titans	Lock	101	13	1	0	54	25
202.	Chris Houston	(Australia)	2008–09, 2011–15	Rd. 1	St. George Illawarra Dragons	Second-row	160	27	0	0	108	23
203.	Wes Naiqama	(Australia) (Fiji)	2008–12	Rd. 1	St. George Illawarra Dragons	Centre	75	15	60	0	180	25
204.	Danny Wicks	(Australia)	2008–09	Rd. 1	St. George Illawarra Dragons	Prop	40	4	0	0	16	22
205.	Cameron Ciraldo	(Australia) (Italy)	2008–11	Rd. 2	Cronulla-Sutherland Sharks	Second-row	43	4	0	0	16	23
206.	Keith Lulia	(Australia) (Cook Islands)	2008–11	Rd. 2	St. George Illawarra Dragons	Centre	46	10	0	0	40	20
207.	Ben Cross	(Australia)	2008–10	Rd. 5	Melbourne Storm	Prop	39	0	0	0	0	29
208.	Junior Sa'u	(New Zealand) (Samoa)	2008–12	Rd. 13	Debut	Centre	86	26	0	0	104	21
209.	Akuila Uate	(Fiji) (Australia)	2008–16	Rd. 19	Debut	Wing	161	110	0	0	440	20
210.	Isaac De Gois	(Australia) (Portugal)	2009–11	Rd. 1	Cronulla-Sutherland Sharks	Hooker	63	7	0	0	28	24
211.	Ben Rogers	(Australia)	2009–11	Rd. 1	St. George Illawarra Dragons	Five-eighth	30	4	0	1	17	23
212.	Tim Natusch	(Papua New Guinea)	2009	Rd. 3	Debut	Prop	3	0	0	0	0	22
213.	George Ndaira	(Australia) (Lebanon)	2009–10	Rd. 3	South Sydney Rabbitohs	Hooker	8	0	1	0	2	24
214.	Shannon McDonnell	(Australia) (Republic of Ireland)	2009–11	Rd. 12	Wests Tigers	Fullback	29	7	0	0	28	21
215.	Constantine Mika	(New Zealand) (Samoa)	2009–11	Rd. 12	Debut	Second-row	14	1	0	0	4	19
216.	Sione Tovo	(Australia) (Tonga)	2009	Rd. 23	Debut	Prop	1	0	0	0	0	21
217.	Evarn Tuimavave	(New Zealand) (Samoa)	2010–12	Rd. 1	New Zealand Warriors	Prop	33	2	0	0	8	25
218.	Joel Edwards	(Australia)	2010–12	Rd. 15	Debut	Lock	45	0	0	0	0	21
219.	Antonio Kaufusi	(Tonga) (Australia)	2010–11	Rd. 18	North Queensland Cowboys	Prop	33	2	0	0	8	25
220.	Kevin Naiqama	(Australia) (Fiji)	2010, 2012–13	Rd. 26	Debut	Wing	15	9	0	0	36	21
221.	Neville Costigan	(Papua New Guinea) (Australia)	2011–13	Rd. 1	St. George Illawarra Dragons	Lock	57	6	0	0	24	25
222.	Beau Henry	(Australia)	2011	Rd. 1	Debut	Five-eighth	6	2	0	0	8	21
223.	Tyrone Roberts	(Australia)	2011–15	Rd. 6	Debut	Halfback	97	21	163	0	410	19
224.	Steve Southern	(Australia)	2011	Rd. 6	North Queensland Cowboys	Lock	7	0	0	0	0	28
225.	Marvin Filipo	(New Zealand)	2011–12	Rd. 10	Debut	Second-row	4	0	0	0	0	24
226.	Peter Mata'utia	(Australia) (Samoa)	2011–12, 2016–17	Rd. 11	Debut	Centre	41	12	0	0	48	20
227.	Ryan Stig	(Australia)	2011	Rd. 15	Debut	Five-eighth	13	1	2	0	8	21
228.	Zane Tetevano	(New Zealand) (Cook Islands)	2011–14	Rd. 20	Debut	Prop	29	2	0	0	8	20
229.	Siuatonga Likiliki	(New Zealand) (Tonga)	2011	Rd. 25	New Zealand Warriors	Centre	2	0	0	0	0	21
230.	Darius Boyd	(Australia)	2012–14	Rd. 1	St. George Illawarra Dragons	Fullback	62	17	0	0	68	24
231.	Adam Cuthbertson	(Australia)	2012–14	Rd. 1	St. George Illawarra Dragons	Lock	53	2	0	0	8	27
232.	Alex McKinnon	(Australia)	2012–14	Rd. 1	St. George Illawarra Dragons	Second-row	46	4	0	0	16	20
233.	Willie Mason	(New Zealand) (Australia) (Tonga)	2012–14	Rd. 8	Hull Kingston Rovers	Prop	60	2	0	0	8	32
234.	Chris Adams	(Australia)	2012, 2016	Rd. 10	Debut	Hooker	8	0	0	0	0	25
235.	Dane Gagai	(Australia)	2012–17, 2022–26	Rd. 14	Brisbane Broncos	Centre	242	54	34	0	284	21
236.	Kyle O'Donnell	(Australia)	2012	Rd. 18	Debut	Prop	1	0	0	0	0	21
237.	Robbie Rochow	(Australia)	2012–16	Rd. 19	Melbourne Storm	Second-row	72	7	0	0	28	21
238.	Beau Scott	(Australia)	2013–15	Rd. 1	St. George Illawarra Dragons	Second-row	54	9	0	0	36	28
239.	Jeremy Smith	(New Zealand)	2013–16	Rd. 1	Cronulla-Sutherland Sharks	Lock	75	6	1	0	26	32
240.	Travis Waddell	(Australia)	2013–14	Rd. 1	Canberra Raiders	Hooker	20	1	0	0	4	23
241.	David Fa'alogo	(New Zealand) (Samoa)	2013–15	Rd. 3	Huddersfield Giants	Prop	56	3	0	0	12	32
242.	Korbin Sims	(Australia) (Fiji)	2013–16	Rd. 3	Debut	Prop	76	7	0	0	28	21
243.	Joseph Leilua	(Australia) (Samoa) (New Zealand)	2013–15	Rd. 6	Sydney Roosters	Centre	54	30	0	0	120	21
244.	Adam Clydsdale	(Australia)	2013–15	Rd. 9	Debut	Hooker	40	4	0	0	16	20
245.	Josh Mantellato	(Australia) (Italy)	2013–14	Rd. 12	Debut	Wing	2	1	6	0	16	26
246.	Craig Gower	(Australia) (Italy)	2013	Rd. 14	London Broncos	Hooker	6	1	0	0	4	35
247.	Michael Dobson	(Australia)	2014	Rd. 1	Hull Kingston Rovers	Five-eighth	6	0	0	0	0	27
248.	Matt Minto	(Australia)	2014	Rd. 2	Debut	Fullback	2	0	0	0	0	23
249.	Jake Mamo	(Australia)	2014–16	Rd. 7	Debut	Fullback	29	11	0	0	44	19
250.	Joseph Tapine	(New Zealand)	2014–15	Rd. 9	Debut	Lock	20	1	0	0	4	20
251.	Paterika Vaivai	(Samoa)	2014–15	Rd. 9	Debut	Prop	6	0	0	0	0	22
252.	Chanel Mata'utia	(Australia) (Samoa)	2014–17	Rd. 20	Debut	Wing	13	7	0	0	28	21
253.	Sione Mata'utia	(Australia) (Samoa)	2014–20	Rd. 20	Debut	Centre	124	31	0	0	124	18
254.	Tyler Randell	(Australia)	2014–17	Rd. 25	Debut	Hooker	44	5	2	0	24	21
255.	Jack Stockwell	(Australia)	2015–17	Rd. 1	St. George Illawarra Dragons	Prop	28	2	0	0	8	23
256.	Tariq Sims	(Australia) (Fiji)	2015–16	Rd. 5	North Queensland Cowboys	Second-row	27	4	0	0	16	25
257.	Chad Redman	(Australia)	2015	Rd. 10	Debut	Hooker	2	1	0	0	4	22
258.	Sam Mataora	(Cook Islands)	2015–17	Rd. 12	Canberra Raiders	Prop	30	2	0	0	8	24
259.	Carlos Tuimavave	(New Zealand) (Samoa)	2015	Rd. 12	New Zealand Warriors	Five-eighth	5	1	0	0	4	23
260.	Danny Levi	(New Zealand)	2015–19	Rd. 15	Debut	Hooker	83	5	0	0	20	19
261.	Lachlan Fitzgibbon	(Australia)	2015–23	Rd. 21	Debut	Second-row	119	32	0	0	128	21
262.	Nathan Ross	(Australia)	2015–18	Rd. 21	Debut	Wing	60	23	0	0	92	26
263.	David Bhana	(New Zealand)	2016	Rd. 1	Debut	Lock	7	1	0	0	4	23
264.	Jaelen Feeney	(Australia)	2016–17	Rd. 1	Debut	Halfback	13	1	0	0	4	21
265.	Trent Hodkinson	(Australia)	2016–17	Rd. 1	Canterbury-Bankstown Bulldogs	Halfback	40	2	93	2	196	27
266.	Pat Mata'utia	(Australia) (Samoa)	2016	Rd. 1	Debut	Centre	14	2	0	0	8	22
267.	Pauli Pauli	(Australia) (Samoa)	2016	Rd. 1	Parramatta Eels	Second-row	15	1	0	0	4	21
268.	Daniel Saifiti	(Australia) (Fiji)	2016–24	Rd. 1	Debut	Prop	183	19	0	0	76	19
269.	Jacob Saifiti	(Australia) (Fiji)	**2016–**	Rd. 1	Debut	Prop	192	13	0	0	52	19
270.	Cory Denniss	(Australia)	2016–18	Rd. 3	Debut	Wing	18	4	0	0	16	18
271.	Mickey Paea	(Australia) (Tonga)	2016–17	Rd. 3	Hull F.C.	Prop	20	0	0	0	0	29
272.	Will Pearsall	(Australia)	2016	Rd. 6	Debut	Hooker	3	0	0	0	0	21
273.	Josh King	(Australia)	2016–21	Rd. 7	Debut	Prop	78	2	0	0	8	20
274.	Brock Lamb	(Australia)	2016–18	Rd. 9	Debut	Five-eighth	32	5	30	1	81	19
275.	Jack Cogger	(Australia)	2016–18, 2024–25	Rd. 10	Debut	Halfback	58	4	6	2	30	18
276.	Mitchell Barnett	(Australia)	2016–22	Rd. 14	Canberra Raiders	Second-row	126	21	16	0	116	22
277.	Brendan Elliot	(Australia)	2016–17	Rd. 14	Sydney Roosters	Wing	24	10	0	0	40	22
278.	Dylan Phythian	(Australia)	2016–17	Rd. 25	Debut	Fullback	3	1	0	0	4	21
279.	Jamie Buhrer	(Australia)	2017–19	Rd. 1	Manly Warringah Sea Eagles	Lock	45	1	0	0	4	27
280.	Ken Sio	(Australia)	2017–18	Rd. 1	Hull Kingston Rovers	Wing	41	17	25	0	118	26
281.	Josh Starling	(Australia)	2017	Rd. 1	Manly Warringah Sea Eagles	Prop	13	0	0	0	0	26
282.	Sam Stone	(Australia)	2017–18	Rd. 1	Debut	Second-row	18	2	0	0	8	19
283.	Luke Yates	(Australia)	2017–18	Rd. 1	Debut	Lock	25	0	0	0	0	21
284.	Joe Wardle	(England) (Scotland)	2017	Rd. 4	Huddersfield Giants	Centre	17	4	0	0	16	25
285.	Anthony Tupou	(Australia) (Tonga)	2017	Rd. 5	Wakefield Trinity	Prop	4	0	0	0	0	34
286.	Jacob Gagan	(Australia)	2017	Rd. 5	Cronulla-Sutherland Sharks	Wing	1	1	0	0	4	24
287.	Shaun Kenny-Dowall	(Australia) (New Zealand)	2017–19	Rd. 20	Sydney Roosters	Wing	53	18	0	0	72	29
288.	Tyrone Amey	(Australia)	2017	Rd. 26	Debut	Prop	1	0	0	0	0	21
289.	Herman Ese'ese	(New Zealand) (Samoa)	2018–20	Rd. 1	Brisbane Broncos	Prop	62	5	0	0	20	23
290.	Slade Griffin	(Australia) (New Zealand)	2018	Rd. 1	Melbourne Storm	Hooker	16	2	0	0	8	27
291.	Aidan Guerra	(Australia) (Italy)	2018–20	Rd. 1	Sydney Roosters	Second-row	57	9	1	0	38	30
292.	Chris Heighington	(Australia) (England)	2018	Rd. 1	Cronulla-Sutherland Sharks	Prop	21	1	0	0	4	36
293.	Jacob Lillyman	(Australia)	2018	Rd. 1	New Zealand Warriors	Prop	15	0	0	0	0	34
294.	Tautau Moga	(Australia) (Samoa)	2018–20	Rd. 1	Brisbane Broncos	Centre	14	4	0	0	16	24
295.	Mitchell Pearce	(Australia)	2018–21	Rd. 1	Sydney Roosters	Halfback	71	15	0	5	65	28
296.	Kalyn Ponga	(Australia)	**2018–**	Rd. 1	North Queensland Cowboys	Fullback	156	58	291	0	814	19
297.	Connor Watson	(Australia)	2018–21	Rd. 1	Sydney Roosters	Five-eighth	66	14	0	0	56	21
298.	Nick Meaney	(Australia)	2018	Rd. 18	Debut	Fullback	5	2	1	0	10	20
299.	JJ Collins	(Australia)	2018	Rd. 21	Wests Tigers	Prop	2	0	0	0	0	22
300.	Pasami Saulo	(Australia)	**2018–22, 2026–**	Rd. 22	Debut	Prop	45	0	0	0	0	20
301.	Tom Starling	(Australia)	2018	Rd. 25	Debut	Hooker	1	0	0	0	0	20
302.	James Gavet	(Australia) (Samoa)	2019	Rd. 1	New Zealand Warriors	Prop	18	1	0	0	4	29
303.	Tim Glasby	(Australia)	2019–20	Rd. 1	Melbourne Storm	Lock	28	2	0	0	8	29
304.	Hymel Hunt	(New Zealand) (Samoa)	2019–23	Rd. 1	South Sydney Rabbitohs	Wing	66	22	0	0	88	25
305.	David Klemmer	(Australia)	2019–22	Rd. 1	Canterbury-Bankstown Bulldogs	Prop	81	1	0	0	4	25
306.	Edrick Lee	(Australia)	2019–20, 2022	Rd. 1	Cronulla-Sutherland Sharks	Wing	41	26	0	0	104	26
307.	Kurt Mann	(Australia)	2019–23	Rd. 1	St. George Illawarra Dragons	Five-eighth	90	15	0	1	61	26
308.	Jesse Ramien	(Australia)	2019	Rd. 1	Cronulla-Sutherland Sharks	Centre	17	2	0	0	8	21
309.	Mason Lino	(Samoa)	2019–20	Rd. 4	New Zealand Warriors	Five-eighth	17	2	48	0	104	25
310.	Phoenix Crossland	(New Zealand)	**2019–**	Rd. 16	Debut	Hooker	132	13	1	0	54	18
311.	Bradman Best	(Australia)	**2019–**	Rd. 23	Debut	Centre	123	47	0	0	188	18
312.	Starford To'a	(New Zealand)	2019–21	Rd. 25	Debut	Wing	20	11	0	0	44	19
313.	Jayden Brailey	(Australia)	2020–25	Rd. 1	Cronulla-Sutherland Sharks	Hooker	85	5	0	0	20	23
314.	Gehamat Shibasaki	(Australia)	2020–21	Rd. 1	Brisbane Broncos	Centre	14	6	0	0	24	22
315.	Enari Tuala	(Australia)	2020–24	Rd. 1	North Queensland Cowboys	Centre	87	40	0	0	160	21
316.	Tex Hoy	(Australia)	2020–22	Rd. 3	Debut	Fullback	29	5	15	0	50	20
317.	Chris Randall	(Australia)	2020–22	Rd. 3	Debut	Hooker	29	3	0	0	8	28
318.	Brodie Jones	(Australia)	2020–26	Rd. 3	Debut	Second-row	91	7	0	0	28	22
319.	Andrew McCullough	(Australia)	2020	Rd. 4	Brisbane Broncos	Hooker	8	2	0	0	8	30
320.	Blake Green	(Australia)	2020–21	Rd. 13	New Zealand Warriors	Halfback	9	0	0	0	0	33
321.	Tyson Frizell	(Australia) (Wales)	2021–26	Rd. 1	St. George Illawarra Dragons	Second-row	129	17	0	0	68	29
322.	Sauaso Sue	(New Zealand) (Samoa)	2021–22	Rd. 1	Canterbury-Bankstown Bulldogs	Lock	30	2	0	0	8	28
323.	Dom Young	(England)	**2021–23, 2025–**	Rd. 3	Huddersfield Giants	Wing	88	70	0	0	280	19
324.	Brayden Musgrove	(Australia)	2021	Rd. 6	Debut	Wing	7	1	0	0	4	23
325.	Simi Sasagi	(New Zealand)	2021–22	Rd. 11	Debut	Lock	16	0	0	0	0	20
326.	Jake Clifford	(Australia)	2021–22	Rd. 13	North Queensland Cowboys	Five-eighth	25	4	52	0	120	23
327.	Mat Croker	(Australia)	**2021–**	Rd. 13	Debut	Lock	110	8	0	0	32	21
328.	Jack Johns	(Australia)	2021–23	Rd. 13	South Sydney Rabbitohs	Second-row	14	2	0	0	8	23
329.	Jirah Momoisea	(New Zealand)	2021–22	Rd. 23	Debut	Prop	8	0	0	0	0	22
330.	Adam Clune	(Australia)	2022–23	Rd. 1	St. George Illawarra Dragons	Halfback	22	3	0	1	13	26
331.	Leo Thompson	(New Zealand)	2022–25	Rd. 1	Debut	Prop	80	3	0	0	12	21
332.	Anthony Milford	(Australia) (Samoa)	2022	Rd. 11	Brisbane Broncos	Five-eighth	13	0	8	0	16	27
333.	Krystian Mapapalangi	(Australia)	2022, 2024	Rd. 23	Debut	Centre	6	1	0	0	4	19
334.	Oryn Keeley	(Australia)	2022–23	Rd. 23	Debut	Second-row	2	0	0	0	0	19
335.	Adam Elliott	(Australia)	2023–25	Rd. 1	Canberra Raiders	Lock	47	4	0	0	16	28
336.	Jackson Hastings	(Australia) (England)	2023–25	Rd. 1	Wests Tigers	Halfback	43	7	36	0	100	27
337.	Jack Hetherington	(Australia)	2023–25	Rd. 1	Canterbury-Bankstown Bulldogs	Prop	53	2	0	0	8	26
338.	Lachie Miller	(Australia)	2023	Rd. 1	Cronulla-Sutherland Sharks	Fullback	12	2	26	0	60	28
339.	Tyson Gamble	(Australia)	2023–26	Rd. 2	Brisbane Broncos	Five-eighth	45	8	1	1	35	26
340.	Dylan Lucas	(Australia)	**2023–**	Rd. 3	Debut	Second-row	60	25	0	0	96	22
341.	Ryan Rivett	(Australia)	2023	Rd. 3	Debut	Five-eighth	1	0	0	0	0	20
342.	Tom Cant	(Australia)	**2023–**	Rd. 3	Debut	Second-row	40	0	0	0	0	20
343.	Greg Marzhew	(New Zealand)	**2023–**	Rd. 4	Gold Coast Titans	Wing	88	60	0	0	240	25
344.	Fa'amanu Brown	(New Zealand) (Samoa)	2023	Rd. 26	Canterbury-Bankstown Bulldogs	Hooker	2	1	0	0	4	28
345.	Riley Jones	(Australia)	2023	Rd. 27	Debut	Hooker	1	0	0	0	0	21
346.	Kai Pearce-Paul	(England)	2024–25	Rd. 1	Wigan Warriors	Second-row	44	3	0	0	12	23
347.	Jed Cartwright	(Australia)	2024	Rd. 2	South Sydney Rabbitohs	Second-row	3	0	0	0	0	27
348.	Thomas Jenkins	(Australia)	2024	Rd. 2	Penrith Panthers	Wing	5	0	0	0	0	23
349.	David Armstrong	(Australia)	2024	Rd. 8	Debut	Fullback	5	5	0	0	20	23
350.	Fletcher Sharpe	(Australia)	**2024–**	Rd. 14	Debut	Five-eighth	52	35	0	0	140	20
351.	Will Pryce	(England)	2024	Rd. 17	Huddersfield Giants	Five-eighth	5	1	2	0	8	21
352.	Kyle McCarthy	(China)	**2024–**	Rd. 24	Debut	Centre	6	1	0	0	4	20
353.	Sebastian Su'a	(New Zealand)	2024	Rd. 25	Debut	Prop	1	0	0	0	0	20
354.	James Schiller	(Australia)	**2025–**	Rd. 1	Canberra Raiders	Wing	17	8	0	0	32	23
355.	Jermaine McEwen	(Australia)	**2025–**	Rd. 3	Debut	Second-row	40	7	0	0	28	19
356.	Matt Arthur	(Australia)	**2025–**	Rd. 6	Parramatta Eels	Hooker	2	0	0	0	0	20
357.	Tyrone Thompson	(New Zealand)	2025	Rd. 6	Debut	Prop	3	0	0	0	0	24
358.	Fletcher Hunt	(Australia)	**2025–**	Rd. 11	Debut	Centre	30	18	0	0	72	19
359.	Paul Bryan	(Australia)	2025	Rd. 12	Debut	Prop	1	0	0	0	0	22
360.	Elijah Salesa-Leaumoana	(Samoa)	**2025–**	Rd. 14	Debut	Second-row	9	1	0	0	4	21
361.	Brock Greacen	(Australia)	2025	Rd. 15	Debut	Prop	1	0	0	0	0	22
362.	Jake Arthur	(Australia)	2025	Rd. 23	Manly Warringah Sea Eagles	Five-eighth	5	0	0	0	0	22
363.	Connor Votano	(Australia)	2025	Rd. 24	Debut	Fullback	1	0	0	0	0	19
364.	Cody Hopwood	(Australia)	**2025–**	Rd. 27	Debut	Prop	19	0	0	0	0	19
365.	Dylan Brown	(New Zealand)	**2026–**	Rd. 1	Parramatta Eels	Halfback	15	2	1	0	9	25
366.	Trey Mooney	(Australia) (New Zealand)	**2026–**	Rd. 1	Canberra Raiders	Prop	22	5	0	0	20	23
367.	Sandon Smith	(Australia)	**2026–**	Rd. 1	Sydney Roosters	Halfback	25	3	61	0	134	23
368.	Harrison Graham	(Australia)	**2026–**	Rd. 2	Dolphins	Hooker	20	2	0	0	8	24
369.	Francis Manuleleua	(New Zealand)	**2026–**	Rd. 3	Debut	Second-row	15	4	0	0	16	21
370.	Wilson De Courcey	(Australia)	**2026–**	Rd. 5	Debut	Centre	2	0	0	0	0	20
371.	Peter Hola	(Australia)	**2026–**	Rd. 7	Dolphins	Prop	1	0	0	0	0	26
372.	Lachlan Crouch	(Australia)	**2026–**	Rd. 18	Debut	Prop	12	0	0	0	0	23
373.	Toby Winter	(Australia)	**2026–**	Rd. 24	Debut	Centre	1	0	0	0	0	19

== See also ==
- List of Newcastle Knights Women's players
