= 1999 NRL Grand Final =

Final game of Australian rugby league season

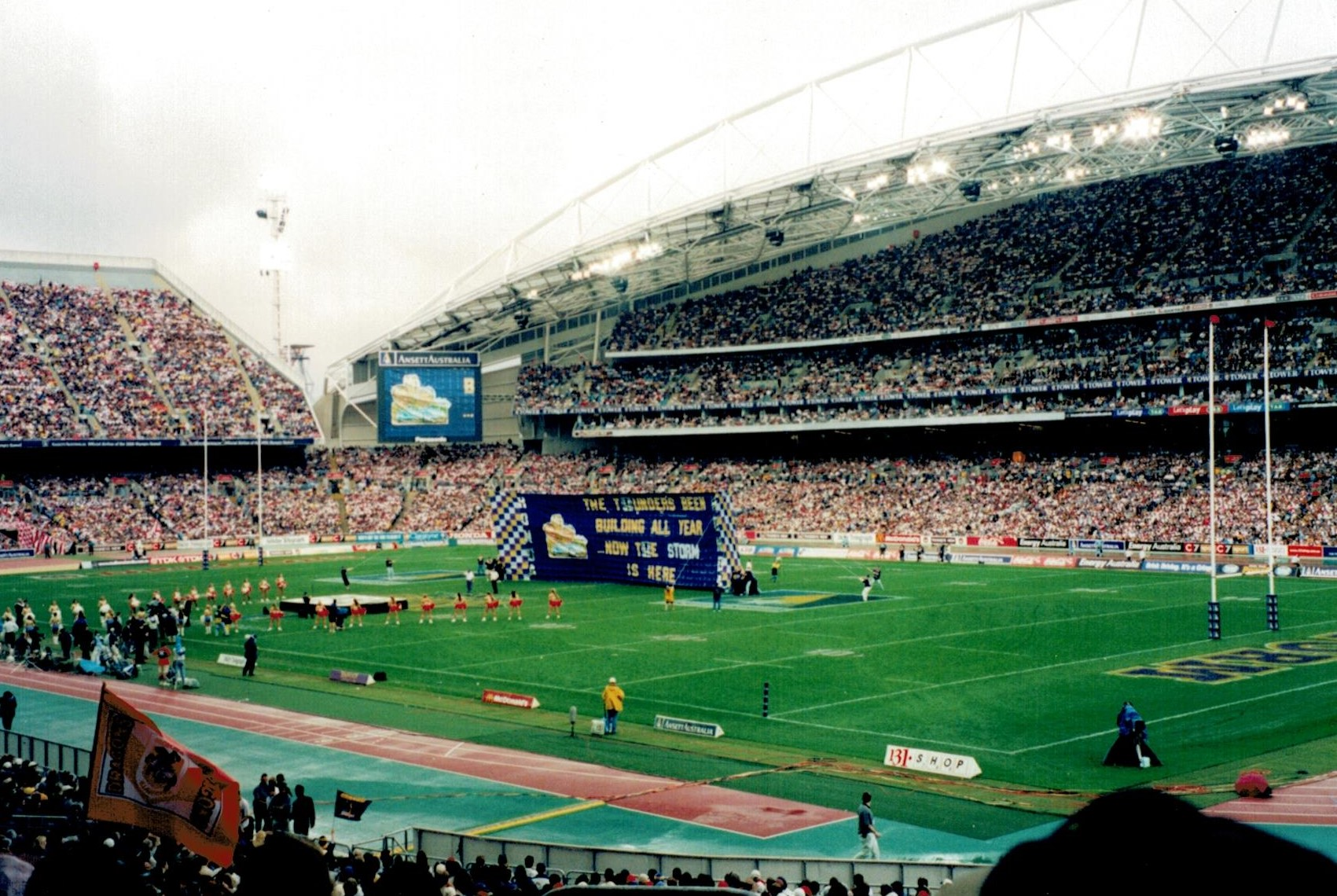
- Stadium Australia, where the match was played

Melbourne Storm	St George Illawarra Dragons
20	18
	1	2	Total
MEL	0	20	20
STG	14	4	18
- Date: 26 September 1999
- Stadium: Stadium Australia
- Location: Sydney, Australia
- Clive Churchill Medal: Brett Kimmorley (MEL)
- National anthem: Hugh Jackman
- Referee: Bill Harrigan
- Attendance: 107,999

Broadcast partners
- Broadcasters: Nine Network
- Commentators: Ken Sutcliffe (host); Ray Warren; Peter Sterling; Paul Vautin; Laurie Daley, Paul Harragon & Steve Roach (sideline)

The 1999 NRL Grand Final was the conclusive and premiership-deciding game of the 1999 NRL season. It was contested by the competition's two newest clubs: the Melbourne Storm, competing in only its second year (having finished the regular season in 3rd place); and the St. George Illawarra Dragons, in their first year as a joint-venture club (having finished the regular season in 6th place), after both sides eliminated the rest of the top eight during the finals.

A new rugby league world record crowd of 107,999 was at Stadium Australia for the game. The attendance, which saw 67,142 more people attend than had done so for the 1998 NRL Grand Final at the Sydney Football Stadium, broke the record attendance for a Grand Final, eclipsing the previous record of 78,065 set in 1965 when St. George defeated South Sydney 12–8 at the Sydney Cricket Ground. It was the last time that the Clive Churchill Medal was presented in a case before it was changed the following season where it is presented separately with a ribbon being worn around the neck. Due to its competitive nature, it has been regarded as one of the greatest NRL grand finals of all time.

Pre-match entertainment featured Hugh Jackman's rendition of the Australian national anthem.

== Background ==
The 1999 NRL season was the 92nd season of professional rugby league football in Australia, and the second to be run by the National Rugby League. With the exclusion of the Adelaide Rams and Gold Coast Chargers, and the merger of the St. George Dragons and Illawarra Steelers, seventeen teams competed for the NRL Premiership during the 1999 season, which culminated in the first grand final to be played at Stadium Australia.

=== Melbourne Storm ===
The 1999 Melbourne Storm season was the second in the club's history. Coached by Chris Anderson and captained by Glenn Lazarus, they competed in the NRL's 1999 Telstra Premiership, finishing the regular season in 3rd (out of 17).

Round	1	2	3	4	5	6	7	8	9	10	11	12	13	14	15	16	17	18	19	20	21	22	23	24	25	26
Result	W	L	W	W	L	W	L	W	W	W	W	B	L	L	L	W	W	L	W	W	W	W	W	W	L	B
Ladder Position	3	7	4	3	6	5	5	4	4	4	3	3	3	4	6	5	4	7	6	6	5	4	3	2	4	3

Source: Rugby League Tables
B = Bye; W = Win; D = Draw; L = Loss

=== St. George Illawarra Dragons ===
The 1999 St. George Illawarra Dragons season was the first in the newly formed joint-venture club's history. Coached by David Waite and Andrew Farrar, and captained by Paul McGregor, they competed in the NRL's 1999 Telstra Premiership, finishing the regular season in 6th place (out of 17).

Round	1	2	3	4	5	6	7	8	9	10	11	12	13	14	15	16	17	18	19	20	21	22	23	24	25	26
Result	L	L	W	L	W	W	W	L	W	L	L	W	W	B	W	W	W	B	W	W	L	W	L	L	W	W
Ladder Position	12	15	13	13	13	9	6	9	6	10	11	10	9	8	7	6	5	4	4	4	6	5	7	7	7	6

Source: Rugby League Tables
B = Bye; W = Win; D = Draw; L = Loss

== Teams ==
Melbourne named an unchanged team from their preliminary final win against Parramatta. The injured Robbie Kearns and utility Brad Watts were named as the travelling reserves. In a bid to prove his fitness in recovering from a torn quadriceps muscle, Kearns admitted "if I was to play, it would break someone's heart in taking his spot, so I will really have to weigh things up before making a final decision." Three Storm players — Robbie Ross (corked thigh), Craig Smith (shoulder and knee) and Ben Roarty (shoulder) all spent time in recovery in the week leading up to the Grand Final, missing some training sessions, but made it through to take their places in the team. Kearns ruled himself out of the Melbourne team in the lead-up, making the call to sit out of the match due to his persistent thigh injury. Melbourne had two players with Grand Final experience — Tawera Nikau (Cronulla, 1997) and Glenn Lazarus, who had won twice before with Canberra (1989, 1990) and Brisbane (1992, 1993).

St. George-Illawarra were also unchanged from their win over the Cronulla Sharks. The Dragons resisted the urge to change wingers, keeping Rod Wishart on the bench. There was also no room in the team for the retiring Mark Coyne, who had not played for more than two months due to a neck injury, despite resuming training during the finals series. Prop forward Corey Pearson was also ruled out by the Dragons after he injured his shoulder in the club's qualifying final win earlier in the month. It was reported in the lead-up that Anthony Mundine had been suffering from a bout of tonsilitis, but was in no doubt of missing the match. The Dragons had six players with past Grand Final experience — Wayne Bartrim, Nathan Brown, Brad Mackay, Anthony Mundine, Lance Thompson and Colin Ward. Of those players only Mundine had been on the winning side with the Brisbane Broncos in the 1997 Super League Grand Final.

The Dragons would start favourite with the bookmakers, Melbourne given a 5.5 points start on FootyTAB, with the head-to-head odds of $1.45 for the Dragons, with the Storm at $2.55.

Team details
Melbourne Storm		Position	St. George-Illawarra Dragons
Name	Number	Position	Number	Name
Robbie Ross	1	Fullback	1	Luke Patten
Craig Smith	2	Wing	2	Jamie Ainscough
Aaron Moule	3	Centre	3	Paul McGregor (c)
Tony Martin	4	Centre	4	Shaun Timmins
Marcus Bai	5	Wing	5	Nathan Blacklock
Matt Geyer	6	Five eighth	6	Anthony Mundine
Brett Kimmorley	7	Half back	7	Trent Barrett
Glenn Lazarus (c)	8	Prop forward	8	Craig Smith
Richard Swain	9	Hooker	9	Nathan Brown
Rodney Howe	10	Prop forward	10	Chris Leikvoll
Stephen Kearney	11	Second row	11	Lance Thompson
Paul Marquet	12	Second row	12	Darren Treacy
Tawera Nikau	13	Lock forward	13	Wayne Bartrim
Matt Rua	14	Interchange	14	Craig Fitzgibbon
Russell Bawden	15	Interchange	15	Rod Wishart
Ben Roarty	16	Interchange	16	Brad Mackay
Danny Williams	17	Interchange	17	Colin Ward
Chris Anderson		Coach		David Waite & Andrew Farrar

=== Officials ===
Bill Harrigan was appointed as the referee for the match, the sixth time he was appointed for a Grand Final match. Harrigan got the appointment ahead of fellow referee Steve Clark. The touch judges were John McCormack and Colin White, while Chris Ward was appointed as the video referee.

It was reported that Clark was disappointed to be overlooked for the appointment, enquiring with NRL CEO Neil Whittaker and NRL operations manager Graham Annesley whether death threats issued by a Dragons fan played any role in the decision to appoint Harrigan.

== Entertainment ==
Before the match an "entertainment spectacular" was staged featuring Jay Laga'aia, Thelma Houston, John Swan, Mark Gable, Angry Anderson, Rick Price, Genevieve Davis, Hugh Jackman, and Vanessa Amorosi who sang her then latest single Have a Look.

Houston was in Australia playing in the lead role in a production of the musical Fame.

Jackman would sing the Australian national anthem prior to kickoff.

== Broadcast ==
On television, the match was broadcast live in Australia on the Nine Network under their Nine's Wide World of Sports branding. The Grand Final was, uniquely for commercial free-to-air television in Australia, broadcast without advertisements during the match itself. Subscription television channels Fox Sports and C7 Sport also had live coverage of the match.

Radio broadcasters included 2UE, whose Continuous Call team led by Ray Hadley broadcast more than 12 hours of coverage from the venue; while ABC Radio Sydney (then known as 2BL) also provided coverage from 1pm through 6pm local time. Youth broadcaster Triple J also provided coverage of the match with Roy & H.G. commentating.

== Match details ==
St. George Illawarra were up 14–0 at half time, with a converted try and penalty goal to Craig Fitzgibbon, and a converted try to Nathan Blacklock. However, an Anthony Mundine knock-on over the try line early in the second half proved to be a major turning point in the match, with Melbourne running in tries through Tony Martin and Ben Roarty and winger Craig Smith kicking two penalty goals. An unconverted try to Dragons captain Paul McGregor couldn't stem Melbourne's momentum, with Craig Smith kicking the Storm to within four points of the Dragons at 18–14.

In the 77th minute the Storm forced the Dragons to a goal line dropout. Melbourne's halfback Brett Kimmorley then bombed to Craig Smith's wing. Dragons centre Jamie Ainscough, anticipating a Melbourne try, caught Smith in a head-high tackle over the try-line, resulting in Smith being knocked unconscious and, in the process of falling to the ground, Smith knocking on. Referee Bill Harrigan requested video referee Chris Ward adjudicate on the decision. The Melbourne Storm were granted a penalty try, drawing them level with the Dragons. Being a penalty try, the subsequent conversion was taken from directly in front of the posts. Matt Geyer was successful in the conversion and the Storm, for the first time in the match, pulled ahead of the Dragons and took out their first grand final 20–18.

The Melbourne side thus became the quickest expansion team to win a premiership, eclipsing the Canterbury side who won the 1938 premiership in just their fourth season. It was the last game of champion prop and captain Glenn Lazarus, who retired after a remarkable fifth grand final victory (having won premierships with the Canberra Raiders in 1989 and 1990 and with the Brisbane Broncos in 1992 and 1993).

For traditional St. George fans the loss was hard to take. The club were unsuccessful in their four previous visits to the grand final (1985, 1992, 1993 and 1996) and had not won a premiership since 1979. It would not be until 2010 that they would return to another Grand Final, in which it would win its first premiership as a joint-venture.

The grand final attracted a peak television viewership of over 600,000 in Melbourne, a traditional Australian Rules football stronghold. Across Australia according to AC Nielsen figures, the match was watched by 2,440,500 viewers on television, an increase of 34% from the previous year.

Melbourne's 14-point comeback set the record for the largest successful comeback in Grand Final history, until it was surpassed by Penrith's comeback in the 2023 NRL Grand Final.

=== Scoreboard ===
1999 NRL Grand Final

Sunday, 26 September
15:00 AEST (UTC+10)

Melbourne Storm	20–18	St. George-Illawarra Dragons
Tries: 3 Martin 53'; Roarty 57'; Smith (penalty) 75'; Goals: 4 Smith pen 42', 59', pen 64' (3/4); Geyer 77' (1/1)	1st: 0–14; 2nd: 20–4; Report	Tries: 3 Fitzgibbon 13'; Blacklock 29'; McGregor 56'; Goals: 3 Bartrim 15', 31' (2/3); Fitzgibbon pen 23' (1/1)

Stadium Australia, Sydney
Attendance: 107,999
Referee: Bill Harrigan
Video referee: Chris Ward
Touch judges: Colin White, John McCormack
Clive Churchill Medal: Brett Kimmorley (Melbourne)

== Opening matches ==
Two opening matches were played on the ground prior to the Grand Final — the Jersey Flegg Cup final between Canterbury-Bankstown Bulldogs and Newcastle Knights, followed by the First Division final between Balmain Tigers and Parramatta Eels.

Canterbury won the Jersey Flegg Cup final 18–12 over Newcastle, while Parramatta won the First Division final 44–8 over Balmain.

1999 NSWRL Jersey Flegg Cup Grand Final

Sunday, 26 September
10:30 AEST (UTC+10)

Canterbury-Bankstown Bulldogs	18–12	Newcastle Knights
Tries: 3 Amidy; Barton; Hall; Goals: 3 Byrne (3/3)	1st: 12–0; 2nd: 6–12	Tries: 2 Gambrill; Perry; Goals: 2 Johnston (2/2)

Stadium Australia
Referee: Tony Archer
Touch judges: Brian Bonnie, Kevin Russell

Team details
Canterbury-Bankstown Bulldogs		Position	Newcastle Knights
Name	Number	Position	Number	Name
Nathan Barry	1	FB	1	Matthew Petersen
Matthew Amidy	2	WG	2	Ben Gambrill
Andrew Emelio	3	CE	3	Andrew Johnson
Matthew Utai	4	CE	4	Paul Franze
Luke Barton	5	WG	5	Justin Ryder
Nathan Murphy	6	FE	6	Rob Smith
Dean Byrne	7	HB	7	Ben Jeffries (c)
Aaron Findlay	8	PR	8	Josh Perry
Adam Brideson	9	HK	9	John Morris
Ryan O'Hara (c)	10	PF	10	Mark White
Sam Angianga	11	SR	11	Clint Newton
Andrew Johnston	12	SR	12	Matt Jobson
Mark Leafa	13	LK	13	Justin White
Glenn Hall	14	IN	14	Todd Polglase
Grant Wells	15	IN	15	Russell Richards
Tim Murphy	16	IN	16	Adam Woolnough
Brad Morrin	17	IN	17	Matt Kennedy
Kevin Moore		Coach		Steve Burraston

1999 NSWRL First Division Grand Final

Sunday, 26 September
12:30 AEST (UTC+10)

Parramatta Eels	44–8	Balmain Tigers
Tries: 9 Whereat (2); McGuire; Barnes; Cross; Bandy; Patterson; Moran; Lyon; Goals: 4 Marsh (3/6); Whereat (1/1); Moran (0/1); Patterson (0/1); Barnes (0/1)	1st: 24–4; 2nd: 20–4	Tries: 2 Magnus; O'Donnell; Goals: 0 Webber (0/1); Parker (0/1)

Stadium Australia
Referee: Kelvin Jeffes
Touch judges: Martin Ryan, Tom Peek

Team details
Parramatta Eels		Position	Balmain Tigers
Name	Number	Position	Number	Name
Casey McGuire	1	FB	1	Garth Wood
Shane Whereat	2	WG	18	David Parker
Nathan Barnes	3	CE	3	Jacin Sinclair
Tim Patterson	4	CE	4	Justin Yeo
Nathan Cross	14	WG	5	Nathan Webber
Jason Bell (c)	6	FE	6	Brendan Magnus
PJ Marsh	7	HB	7	Shayne Dunley
Adam Wheeler	8	PR	8	Michael Ostini
Dennis Moran	9	HK	9	Ben Galea (c)
Andrew Ryan	10	PF	10	Adam Starr
Charlie Strachan	11	SR	11	Troy Wozniak
Ian Hindmarsh	12	SR	12	Brad Smith
Jay Bandy	13	LK	13	Steve Price
Jamie Lyon	23	IN	15	David Wright
Mitchell Sargent	15	IN	17	Richard Villasanti
Wes Maas	16	IN	19	Tere Glassie
Jason Power	17	IN	20	Luke O'Donnell
Daniel Anderson		Coach		David Bayssari

== See also ==
- 1999 Melbourne Storm season
- 2000 World Club Challenge
