= Todd Bates =

Todd Bates may refer to:

- Todd Bates (rugby league) (born 1983), Australian rugby league player
- Todd Bates (American football) (born 1983), American football player
