= Peter Malcolm =

Peter Malcolm may refer to:

- Peter Malcolm (rugby league) (active 1988), an Australian rugby league player
- Peter Malcolm (rugby union) (born 1994), an American rugby union player
