= Adam Wheeler =

Adam Wheeler may refer to:

- Adam Wheeler (wrestler) (born 1981), American Greco-Roman wrestler
- Adam Wheeler (rugby league) (born 1980), Australian rugby league footballer
- Adam B. Wheeler (fl. 2000s–2020s), guilty of fabricating his academic credentials to gain admission to Harvard University , see Adam Wheeler fraud case
