= Salkeld =

Salkeld may refer to:

- Bill Salkeld (1917–1967), American baseball player
- Blanaid Salkeld (1880–1959), Irish poet, dramatist, and actor
- Catherine Salkeld (1909–1980), Scottish actress
- John Louis Salkeld (1858–1941), Canadian farmer and political figure
- Lancelot Salkeld (1475–1560), last Prior and then first Dean of Carlisle
- Philip Salkeld (1830–1857), British soldier
- Roger Salkeld (born 1971), American baseball player
- Trent Salkeld (born 1981), Australian rugby league footballer
- William Salkeld (1671-1715) English legal writer (Salkeld's Reports)

== See also ==
- Great Salkeld
- Little Salkeld
- Salkeld Hall
