= Gil MacDougall =

Australian rugby league footballer

Personal information
- Full name: Gil MacDougall
- Born: 1942 Sydney, New South Wales, Australia
- Died: 3 March 2011 (aged 68–69) Sydney, New South Wales, Australia

Playing information
- Position: Centre
Club
Years	Team	Pld	T	G	FG	P
1961	Balmain	20	4	0	0	12
1962–66	Western Suburbs	90	15	0	0	45
	Total	110	19	0	0	57
Representative
Years	Team	Pld	T	G	FG	P
1963	New South Wales	3	2	0	0	6
1963	NSW City	1	2	0	0	6
- Relatives: Ben MacDougall (son); Luke MacDougall (son); Adam MacDougall (son)

Gil MacDougall (1942-2012) was an Australian rugby league footballer who played in the 1960s. He played for Western Suburbs and Balmain in the NSWRL competition, as a centre. MacDougall was the father of rugby league players Adam MacDougall, Luke MacDougall and Ben MacDougall.

== Early life ==
MacDougall was born and raised in Sydney and played his junior rugby league in the Balmain area before being graded by Balmain in 1961.

== Playing career ==
MacDougall made his debut for Balmain in 1961 and scored 4 tries for the club as they finished third on the table. Balmain made it to the preliminary final against Western Suburbs but lost the match 7-5 with MacDougall scoring a try in the game. In 1962, MacDougall joined Western Suburbs and in his first year played in the 1962 grand final against St George who were looking at winning their 6th premiership in a row. The game was a much closer affair than the 1961 final but Wests went on to lose the match 9-6. The following year, MacDougall played in his second grand final and the opponents were once again St George. St George went on to win the match 8-3 with MacDougall scoring a try in the losing side. The match was also remembered for the horrid conditions the players had to compete in and the photo of opposition players Norm Provan and Arthur Summons embracing at full time.

The 1963 grand final would be the last time that Wests would reach a final before exiting the competition in 1999. In the same year, MacDougall represented New South Wales and New South Wales City teams. MacDougall stayed loyal to Wests and played there until the end of 1966 and then retired. MacDougall died suddenly on 3 March 2011 following a stroke aged 70.
