= 2002 World Club Challenge =

Rugby league match

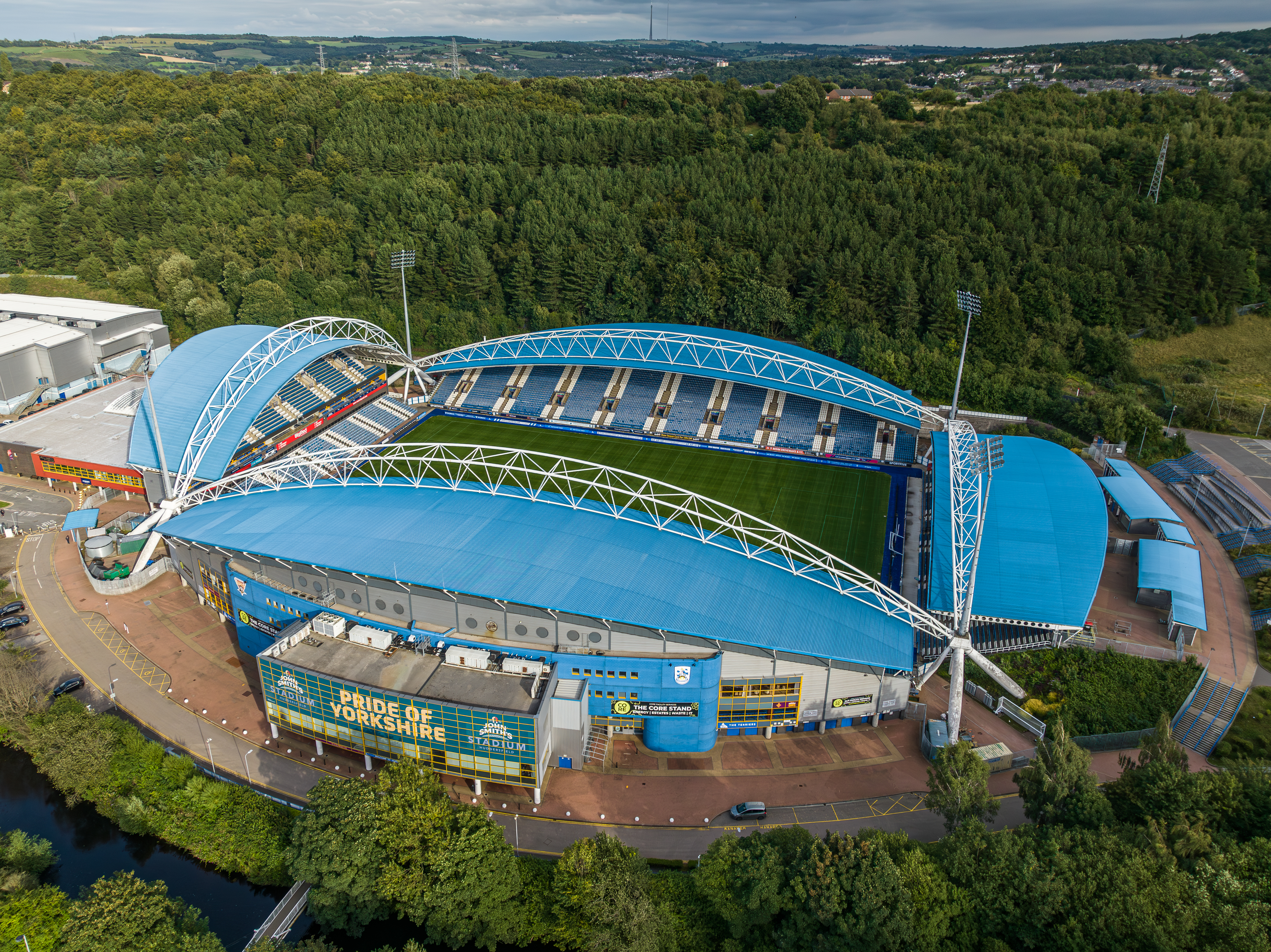
- The Kirklees Stadium hosted the match
Bradford Bulls	Newcastle Knights
(Super League)	(National Rugby League)
41	26
	1	2	Total
BRA	26	15	41
NEW	14	12	26
- Date: 1 February 2002
- Stadium: Kirklees Stadium
- Location: Huddersfield, England
- Man of the Match: James Lowes
- Referee: Stuart Cummings (England)
- Attendance: 21,113

Broadcast partners
- Broadcasters: (United Kingdom) Sky Sports
- Commentators: Eddie Hemmings; Mike Stephenson

The 2002 World Club Challenge was held on Friday, 1 February 2002, at the Alfred McAlpine Stadium, Huddersfield, England. The game was contested by Bradford Bulls and Newcastle Knights.

== Background ==
=== Bradford Bulls ===
The 2001 Super League Grand Final was held on Saturday 13 October 2001, at Old Trafford, Manchester, UK. The game was contested by Bradford Bulls and Wigan Warriors.

=== Newcastle Knights ===
The 2001 NRL grand final was the conclusive and premiership-deciding game of the 2001 NRL season. It was contested by the Newcastle Knights (who had finished the regular season in 3rd place), and the Parramatta Eels (who had finished the regular season in 1st place), after both sides eliminated the rest of the top eight during the finals. The attendance of 90,414 was the third highest ever seen at a rugby league match in Australia.

== Match summary ==
1 February 2002

Bradford Bulls	41 – 26	Newcastle Knights
Tries: Michael Withers (2); Robbie Paul (2); Lesley Vainikolo; Daniel Gartner; Goals: Paul Deacon (8); Field Goals: Paul Deacon	(Report)	Tries: Andrew Johns (2); Josh Smith; Matthew Gidley; Danny Buderus; Goals: Andrew Johns (3)

Alfred McAlpine Stadium, Huddersfield
Attendance: 21,113
Referee: Stuart Cummings (England)
Player of the Match: James Lowes

== Teams ==
Bradford Bulls	Newcastle Knights

FB	1	Michael Withers
RW	2	Tevita Vaikona
RC	3	Scott Naylor
LC	4	Lee Gilmour
LW	5	Lesley Vainikolo
SO	6	Robbie Paul (c)
SH	7	Paul Deacon
PR	8	Joe Vagana
HK	9	James Lowes
PR	10	Brian McDermott
SR	11	Jamie Peacock
SR	12	Daniel Gartner
LF	13	Mike Forshaw
Substitutions:
IC	14	Leon Pryce
IC	15	Brandon Costin
IC	16	Paul Anderson
IC	17	Stuart Fielden
Coach:
(England) Brian Noble

FB	1	Robbie O'Davis
LW	2	Josh Smith
RC	3	Matthew Gidley
LC	4	Mark Hughes
RW	5	Kurt Gidley
FE	6	Sean Rudder
HB	7	Andrew Johns (c)
PR	8	Matt Parsons
HK	9	Danny Buderus
PR	10	Josh Perry
SR	11	Daniel Abraham
SR	12	Steve Simpson
LK	13	Bill Peden
Substitutions:
IC	14	Clinton O'Brien
IC	15	Clint Newton
IC	16	John Morris
IC	17	Matt Jobson
Coach:
(Australia) Michael Hagan
