= Kurt Hancock =

Australian rugby league footballer

Personal information
- Full name: Kurt Hancock
- Born: 9 January 1980 (age 46) Kempsey, New South Wales, Australia

Playing information
Club
Years	Team	Pld	T	G	FG	P
2005	Newcastle Knights	1	0	0	0	0
- Source: As of 2 November 2023

Kurt Hancock (born 9 January 1980 in Kempsey, New South Wales) is an Australian former professional rugby league footballer who played in the 2000s. He played for the Newcastle Knights in 2005.

== Playing career ==
Hancock played his one and only first grade game for Newcastle in round 14 of the 2005 NRL season against Parramatta which saw Newcastle lose 50–0. After being released by Newcastle, Hancock played in the local country competitions and then went into coaching.
