= Michael Ostini =

Australian rugby league footballer

Personal information
- Full name: Michael Ostini
- Born: 7 May 1975 (age 51) Orange, New South Wales, Australia

Playing information
- Position: Prop, Second-row
Club
Years	Team	Pld	T	G	FG	P
1996	Sydney City Roosters	2	0	0	0	0
1997–98	South Sydney	29	1	0	0	4
1999	Balmain Tigers	4	0	0	0	0
	Total	35	1	0	0	4
- Source: As of 30 May 2019

Michael Ostini is an Australian former professional rugby league footballer who played in the 1990s. He played for the Balmain Tigers, Eastern Suburbs and the South Sydney Rabbitohs in the New South Wales Rugby League (NSWRL) competition, Australian Rugby League and NRL competitions.

== Background ==
Ostini played his junior rugby league for Orange CYMS. In 1994, Ostini was named as the Penrith Panthers under 21 player of the year.

== Playing career ==
Ostini made his first grade debut for the Sydney City Roosters in Round 15 1996 who had just changed their name from Eastern Suburbs, which was the club's name from 1908 to 1995. Ostini only made 2 appearances for the club before joining arch rivals South Sydney for the 1997 season.

Ostini made 29 appearances for Souths over 2 seasons before joining Balmain for the 1999 season. Ostini only made 4 appearances for Balmain which was their last season as a stand-alone club before they decided to merge with Western Suburbs to form the Wests Tigers. Ostini's final game in the top grade was in Round 18 1999 against the Brisbane Broncos which Brisbane won 42–10.

== Post playing ==
In 2004, Ostini became head coach of Orange CYMS who play in the Group 10 competition.
