= Chris Mandalidis =

Australian rugby league footballer

Personal information
- Full name: Chris Mandalidis
- Born: 10 January 1975 (age 51) Australia

Playing information

Rugby union
Club
Years	Team	Pld	T	G	FG	P
1997–98	ACT Brumbies	0	0	0	0	0
Representative
Years	Team	Pld	T	G	FG	P
2001	Australian Barbarians	0	0	0	0	0

Rugby league
Club
Years	Team	Pld	T	G	FG	P
1999–00	Newcastle Knights	6	0	0	0	0
- Source: As of 15 Jul 2021

Chris Mandalidis (born 10 January 1975) is an Australian former rugby league footballer who played in the 1990s. He played for the Newcastle Knights from 1999/2000. Chris also played with the ACT brumbies in 1997/1998 and represented Australia at U17,19 and 21 level. Australian barbarians representative in 2001.
