= Darren Forward =

Australian rugby league player

Personal information
- Full name: Darren Forward

Playing information
- Position: Prop
Club
Years	Team	Pld	T	G	FG	P
1988–89	Newcastle Knights	4	0	0	0	0
- Source: As of 8 February 2019

Darren Forward is a former professional rugby league footballer who played in the 1980s. He played for the Newcastle Knights from 1988 to 1989. Post playing career he gave his surname to Newcastle local legend, Mitchell Forward.
