= Blake Mueller =

Australian rugby league footballer

Personal information
- Born: 10 March 1982 (age 44) Belmont, New South Wales, Australia

Playing information
- Position: Halfback
Club
Years	Team	Pld	T	G	FG	P
2003–05	Newcastle Knights	15	0	0	0	0
- Source: As of 8 February 2019
- Relatives: Brock Mueller (brother)

Blake Mueller (born 10 March 1982) is an Australian former professional rugby league footballer. He played as a half back. His brother Brock played for the Newcastle Knights between 1998 and 1999.

== Background ==
Mueller was born in Belmont, New South Wales.

== Playing career ==
Mueller made his first grade debut for Newcastle against Melbourne in Round 8 2003 against Melbourne which ended in a 34-6 loss.

Mueller made 10 appearances for Newcastle in 2005 as the club endured a horror season finishing last and claiming the wooden spoon. His final game for the club was a 28–14 loss against the Sydney Roosters in Round 17 2005.
