= Scott Seamer =

Australian rugby league footballer

Personal information
- Full name: Scott Seamer
- Born: Australia

Playing information
Club
| Years | Team | Pld | T | G | FG | P |
|---|---|---|---|---|---|---|
| 1988 | Newcastle Knights | 2 | 0 | 0 | 0 | 0 |
- Source: As of 14 Jul 2021

Scott Seamer is an Australian former professional rugby league footballer who played for the Newcastle Knights in 1988.
