= Aaron Findlay =

Personal information
- Born: Australia

Playing information
- Position: Second-row
Club
Years	Team	Pld	T	G	FG	P
	Canterbury-Bankstown Bulldogs
Representative
Years	Team	Pld	T	G	FG	P
2000	Russia	2	0	0	0	0

Aaron Findlay is a former member of the Russian national rugby league team who played in the 2000 Rugby League World Cup.

== Biography ==
Findlay was born in Australia and holds Australian citizenship. In 2000, he became one of seven Australian citizens who, because of his Russian roots, received the right to play for the Russian team at the 2000 Rugby League World Cup. He played two matches in the tournament for Russia.

He played lower grades for the Canterbury-Bankstown Bulldogs.
