= Brock Mueller =

Australian rugby league footballer

Personal information
- Born: 23 May 1978 (age 48) Belmont, New South Wales, Australia
- Height: 178 cm (5 ft 10 in)
- Weight: 93 kg (14 st 9 lb)

Playing information
- Position: Second-row
Club
Years	Team	Pld	T	G	FG	P
1998–99	Newcastle Knights	6	1	0	0	4
2001–02	Villeneuve Leopards	14	5	0	0	20
	Total	20	6	0	0	24
- Relatives: Blake Mueller (brother)

Brock Mueller (born 23 May 1978 in Belmont, New South Wales, Australia) is an Australian former professional rugby league footballer. He played for the Newcastle Knights from 1998 to 1999. His position of preference was in the Back Row.

== Playing career ==
Between 1998 and 1999 Mueller was at the Newcastle Knights, coming off the bench in six matches and scoring one try.

Mueller then moved to France and played for the Villeneuve Leopards in 2001 and 2002.

== Personal life ==
His brother Blake played for the Newcastle Knights between 2003 and 2005.
