= Greg Hayward =

Australian rugby league footballer

Personal information
- Full name: Gregory Hayward
- Born: 1963 (age 62–63)
- Height: 6 ft (183 cm)
- Weight: 49 lb (22 kg)

Playing information
- Position: Second-row
Club
Years	Team	Pld	T	G	FG	P
1988	Newcastle Knights	3	0	0	0	0
- Source: As of 5 February 2019

Greg Hayward is an Australian former professional rugby league footballer who played in the 1980s. He played for the Newcastle Knights in 1988 during their inaugural season.

== Playing career ==
Hayward made his first grade debut for Newcastle in Round 9 1988 against St George. Hayward went on to make 2 further appearances for the club in their first season. Haywards last game in the top grade was a 18–16 loss against Balmain at Leichhardt Oval.
