= Luke MacDougall =

Australian rugby league footballer

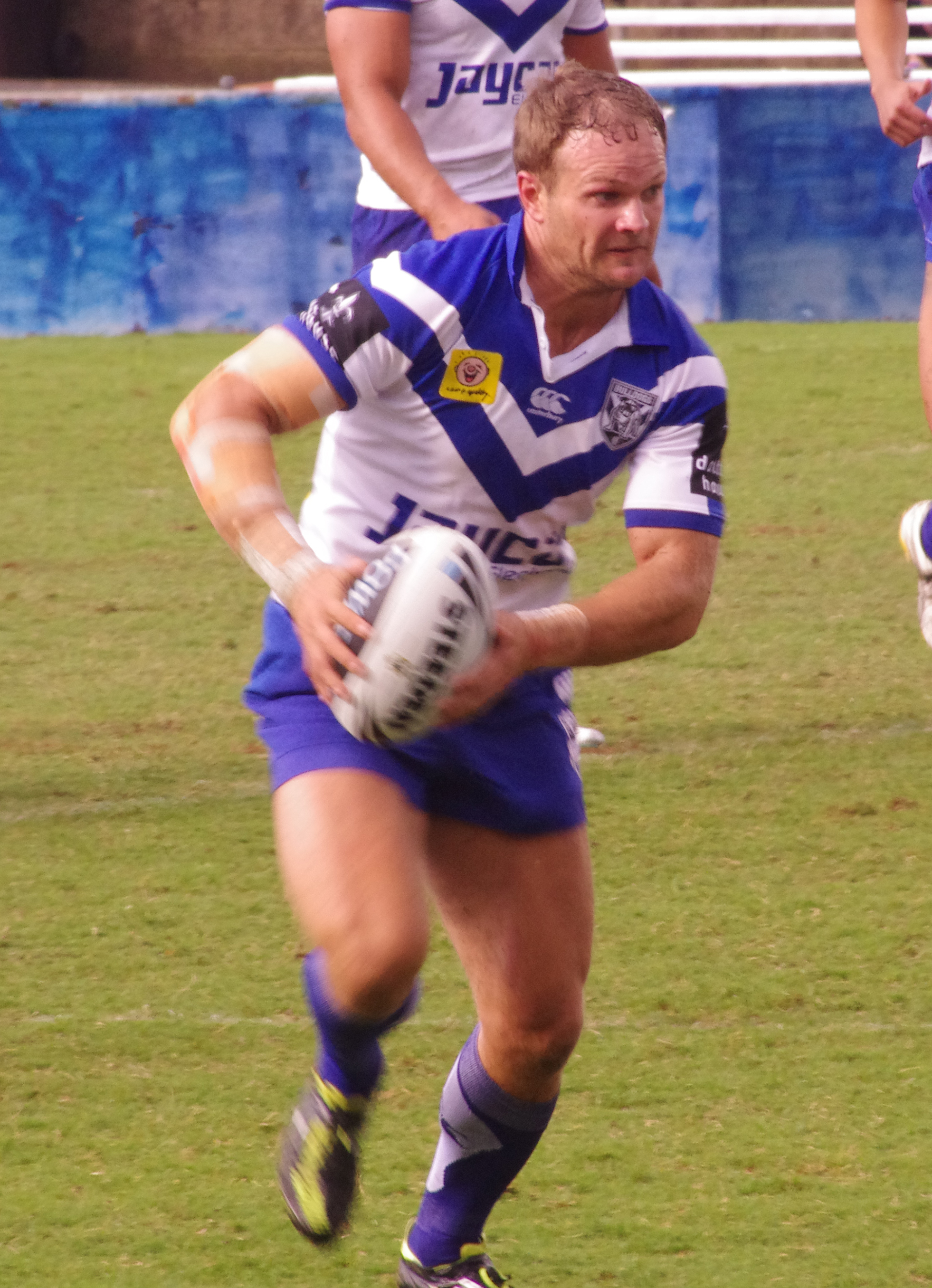

Personal information
- Full name: Luke MacDougall
- Born: 5 February 1982 (age 44) Sydney, New South Wales, Australia

Playing information
- Height: 183 cm (6 ft 0 in)
- Weight: 94 kg (14 st 11 lb)
- Position: Wing
Club
Years	Team	Pld	T	G	FG	P
2002	Cronulla Sharks	7	4	0	0	16
2003–06	South Sydney	47	31	0	0	124
2007	St. George Illawarra	4	1	0	0	4
2007	Newcastle Knights	2	0	0	0	0
2010	Melbourne Storm	10	4	0	0	16
2012	Canterbury Bulldogs	2	0	0	0	0
	Total	72	40	0	0	160
- Father: Gil MacDougall
- Relatives: Ben MacDougall (brother); Adam MacDougall (brother)

Luke MacDougall (born 5 February 1982) is an Australian former professional rugby league footballer in the National Rugby League competition, who last played for the Canterbury-Bankstown Bulldogs. He previously played for the Cronulla-Sutherland Sharks, South Sydney Rabbitohs, St. George Illawarra Dragons, Newcastle Knights and the Melbourne Storm. MacDougall's position of choice was on the wing.

== Background ==
MacDougall was born in Sydney, New South Wales, Australia.

MacDougall is the youngest brother of Australian Kangaroos and State of Origin representative Adam MacDougall, former rugby league and Scottish rugby union player, Ben MacDougall and son of former NRL player Gil MacDougall.

== Playing career ==
MacDougall made his first grade debut for Cronulla-Sutherland in round 4 of the 2002 NRL season against the Brisbane Broncos scoring a try in a 18–16 loss. MacDougall made a total of seven appearances in his debut year and scored four tries.

In 2003, MacDougall signed with the Brisbane Broncos but spent the early part of the season playing for the Toowoomba Clydesdales in the Queensland Cup. In June 2003, he joined the South Sydney Rabbitohs. MacDougall played for Souths during a difficult period in their history where the club finished last in 2003, 2004 and 2006. During the 2005 NRL season, MacDougall was suspended for ten matches after performing a dangerous tackle on Sydney Roosters player Anthony Minichiello.

In 2007, MacDougall joined St. George Illawarra but only managed to play four games before being released to join Newcastle mid-season. In 2010, he signed with Melbourne and played for them during a year in which the club had two premierships stripped from them and were forced to play for no points after the NRL discovered the club had deliberately breached the salary cap between 2006 and 2010.

MacDougall joined Canterbury-Bankstown full-time NRL squad in 2012. He only featured in two games for Canterbury and did not play in the 2012 NRL Grand Final defeat by his former club Melbourne.

== Career highlights ==
- First Grade Debut: 2002 - round 4, Cronulla-Sutherland vs Brisbane Broncos at ANZ Stadium, 7 April

== Retirement ==
MacDougall decided to retire from rugby league at the end of the 2012 NRL season.
