= Robbie Tew =

Australian rugby league footballer & coach

Personal information
- Full name: Robbie Tew
- Born: 28 June 1961 (age 64); Gatton, Queensland, Australia

Playing information
- Position: Five-eighth, Halfback
Club
| Years | Team | Pld | T | G | FG | P |
|---|---|---|---|---|---|---|
| 1988 | Newcastle Knights | 7 | 0 | 14 | 0 | 28 |

Coaching information
Club
| Years | Team | Gms | W | D | L | W% |
| 1997–98 | Workington Town | 0 | 0 | 0 | 0 |
- Source: As of 26 July 2021

Robbie Tew (born 28 June 1961) is a former professional rugby league footballer who played in the 1980s. He was part of the inaugural Newcastle Knights squad in 1988. He was born in Australia.

== Background ==
Tew played rugby league for Redcliffe Dolphins and Toowoomba Clydesdales before signing with newly admitted side Newcastle in 1988.

== Playing career ==
Tew made his first grade debut for Newcastle in the club's inaugural game and scored the side's first ever points in a 28–4 loss against Parramatta. Tew went on to make a further 6 appearances in 1988 with his final game being a 24–16 loss against Illawarra.

== Post playing ==
Tew was the coach of Workington Town in the UK in 1997. Tew later became Newcastle's footman and in 2020 was made a life member of the club.
