= Jay Bandy =

Australian rugby league footballer and administrator

Personal information
- Full name: Jay Bandy
- Born: 29 May 1979 (age 47) Leeton, New South Wales, Australia

Playing information
- Position: Hooker, Lock
Club
Years	Team	Pld	T	G	FG	P
1999	Parramatta Eels	1	0	0	0	0
2000–01	Northern Eagles	10	1	0	0	4
2002	South Sydney	2	0	0	0	0
	Total	13	1	0	0	4
- Source: As of 03 September 2019

Jay Bandy (born 29 May 1979) is an Australian former professional rugby league footballer who played in the 1990s and 2000s. He played for Parramatta, Northern Eagles and South Sydney in the NRL competition.

== Playing career ==
Bandy made his first grade debut for Parramatta against South Sydney in round 26 1999. Bandy played at hooker in a 34–16 victory. At the time, this match was to be South Sydney's last in the competition as they were controversially axed from the league for the 2000 NRL season.

At the end of 1999, Bandy was released by Parramatta and joined the newly formed Northern Eagles. Bandy scored his only first grade try in round 4 of the 2001 NRL season against Canterbury-Bankstown at the Sydney Showground Stadium.

At the end of 2001, Bandy was released by the Northern Eagles and he joined South Sydney who had just won readmission back into the NRL after a long battle through the court system. Bandy made his debut for Souths in round 13 2002 against arch rivals the Sydney Roosters at the Sydney Football Stadium which ended in a 42–6 loss. The following week, Bandy played in his final top grade game as Souths were thrashed 46-10 by the New Zealand Warriors.
