= Tim Patterson (rugby league) =

Australian rugby league footballer

Personal information
- Full name: Tim Patterson
- Born: 6 July 1973 (age 51); Newcastle, New South Wales, Australia

Playing information
- Position: Wing
Club
Years	Team	Pld	T	G	FG	P
1995	Gold Coast Seagulls	16	5	0	0	20
1996	Sydney Tigers	14	2	0	0	8
1999	Parramatta Eels	1	0	0	0	0
	Total	31	7	0	0	28

Tim Patterson (born 6 July 1973) is an Australian former professional rugby league footballer who played as a winger during the 1990s.

He played for the Gold Coast Seagulls, Sydney Tigers and the Parramatta Eels in the NRL.

== Playing career ==
Patterson was an Australian Schoolboys representative in 1991. In 1993, he was graded by the Gold Coast Seagulls. He made his first grade debut in his sides' 28−6 victory over the South Sydney Rabbitohs at the Seagulls Stadium in round 3 of the 1995 season. In 1996, Patterson joined the Sydney Tigers. He played 14 games with the Tigers before leaving the club at season's end. After a few seasons in the lower grades, Patterson joined the Parramatta Eels in the 1999 season. He played only one first grade game with the Eels before retiring from playing at season's end. In total, Patterson played 31 games and scored 7 tries.
