= Brendan Magnus =

Australian rugby league player

Personal information
- Full name: Brendan Magnus
- Born: 20 January 1976 (age 50) Sydney, New South Wales, Australia

Playing information
- Position: Five-eighth, Halfback
Club
| Years | Team | Pld | T | G | FG | P |
|---|---|---|---|---|---|---|
| 1998–99 | Balmain Tigers | 10 | 3 | 0 | 0 | 12 |
| 2000 | London Broncos | 3 | 1 | 0 | 0 | 4 |
| | Total | 13 | 4 | 0 | 0 | 16 |

Brendan Magnus (born 20 January 1976) is an Australian former professional rugby league footballer who played in the 1990s and 2000s. He played for the Balmain Tigers and the London Broncos. His position of choice was five-eighth.

== Playing career ==
Magnus was graded by the now defunct Balmain Tigers in 1997. He made his first grade debut from the bench in his side's 25−16 loss to the Melbourne Storm at Leichhardt Oval in round 13 of the 1998 season. His final game of first grade came in the Tigers' 64−12 loss to the North Sydney Bears at North Sydney Oval in round 13 of the 1999 season. The Tigers finished the season in 15th position and folded at the end of the season.

Magnus was left out of the side for Balmain's final ever first grade game against the Canberra Raiders at Bruce Stadium. Balmain controversially merged with rivals the Western Suburbs Magpies to form the Wests Tigers as part of the NRL's rationalization strategy. Magnus was not offered a contract to play with the newly formed team for the 2000 NRL season and subsequently left Australia at the end of the season.

After his departure from Balmain, Magnus went on to play for the London Broncos in the English Super League competition.
