= Sail Down to Australia =

Single by Genevieve Davis
- Released: October 1993
- Recorded: 1993
- Studio: ABC Studios, Rich Music Studio, Sydney
- Genre: Pop
- Length: 2:37
- Label: EastWest / Warner
- Songwriter: Robie Porter

"Sail Down to Australia" is the debut and only single by Australian singer Genevieve Davis. The song was released to commemorating Australia's 2000 Summer Olympics successful bid. The song peaked at number 38 on the ARIA charts.

== Track listing ==
CD single (4509943212)

1. "Sail Down to Australia" (Vocal Version) - 2:37
2. "Sail Down to Australia" (Instrumental Version) - 2:37
3. "Sail Down to Australia" (Backing Track) - 2:35
4. "Sail Down to Australia" (Orchestral Track) - 2:11

== Charts ==
Chart (1993)	Peak position
Australia (ARIA)	38
