= Adam MacDougall =

Australia international rugby league footballer (born 1975)

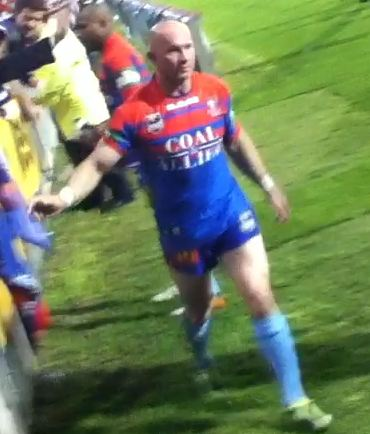

Personal information
- Born: 8 May 1975 (age 51) Sydney, New South Wales, Australia

Playing information
- Height: 183 cm (6 ft 0 in)
- Weight: 93 kg (14 st 9 lb)
- Position: Centre, Wing, Fullback
Club
Years	Team	Pld	T	G	FG	P
1995	Sydney Roosters	6	0	0	0	0
1997–03	Newcastle Knights	86	57	0	0	228
2004–06	South Sydney	31	5	0	0	20
2007–11	Newcastle Knights	72	30	1	0	122
	Total	195	92	1	0	370
Representative
Years	Team	Pld	T	G	FG	P
2006	Country Origin	1	0	0	0	0
1998–01	New South Wales	11	4	0	0	16
2000–01	Australia	11	8	0	0	32
- Father: Gil MacDougall
- Relatives: Ben MacDougall (brother); Luke MacDougall (brother)

Adam "Mad Dog" MacDougall (born 8 May 1975) is an Australian author, businessman and former professional rugby league footballer who played in the 1990s and 2000s. A New South Wales State of Origin and Australian international representative centre and wing, he could also play fullback and spent the majority of his career at the Newcastle Knights, with whom he won the 1997 and 2001 Premierships. He has also played for the Sydney Roosters and South Sydney Rabbitohs. His brothers, Luke MacDougall, Ben MacDougall and Scott MacDougall have also played in the NRL. His father, Gil MacDougall, played for the Balmain Tigers and Western Suburbs Magpies NSWRFL.

In retirement, MacDougall founded a nutrition company that produces the popular meal replacement product, The MAN Shake.

== Background ==
MacDougall was born in Sydney, New South Wales, Australia.

== Sydney Roosters ==
MacDougall made his first-grade debut for the Sydney City Roosters in the 1995 ARL season.

== Newcastle Knights ==
MacDougall is third on the club's all time try scorers list and sixth on the club's all time point-scorers list.

In MacDougall's first season with Newcastle he scored five tries in eleven games that culminated in the club's victory in the 1997 ARL Grand Final where he famously stood on the head of Manly-Warringah captain Geoff Toovey after being tackled by the Manly halfback.

In 1998, MacDougall made his representative debut for New South Wales rugby league team after a stellar start to the season.

On 8 July 1998, MacDougall tested positive to stimulants ephedrine and amfepramone. MacDougall's A and B samples both also recorded an epitestosterone to testosterone level greater than the allowable 6:1 ratio – indicating the possible use of steroids. On 28 August he pleaded guilty to using one banned stimulant and was found to have inadvertently used another and received an 11-match ban along with teammates Robbie O'Davis and Wayne Richards who each received 22-week bans. It was revealed during his appeal that MacDougall had suffered a severe head injury in 1993 that damaged his pituitary gland and it was essential that he take prescribed medication, called Sustanon 250, which included a banned steroid. This medication restored normal hormone levels in his body and without it, he would suffer potentially serious side effects and not be able to lead a normal life, let alone play football.

After just two games back for the Knights in 1999, MacDougall was recalled to the New South Wales rugby league team.

Arguably MacDougall's best seasons came in 2000 and 2001, where he scored 30 tries in 41 games and starred in NSW comprehensive 3–0 series win against Queensland in 2000.

He also played in Australia's victory in the 2000 World Cup Final. In round 20 2001, MacDougall equalled Darren Albert's club record of four tries in a match during Newcastle's 37–30 victory over the New Zealand Warriors at Ericsson Stadium. MacDougall won a second premiership with the Knights, playing on the wing in their 2001 NRL Grand Final victory over the Parramatta Eels. After that he went on the 2001 Kangaroo tour.

== South Sydney Rabbitohs ==
MacDougall switched to the South Sydney Rabbitohs for the 2004 NRL season.

== Return to the Knights ==
MacDougall re-commenced playing for the Knights in the 2007 NRL season. He had already enjoyed a long and successful career with the Knights, having played with them from 1996 to 2003.

In Round 26 of the 2011 NRL season, MacDougall was farewelled in his last home game for the Knights. He played his last game the following week against the Melbourne Storm at AAMI Park in the first week of the finals series.

== Career highlights ==
- Junior Club: Harbord Diggers, De La Salle-Caringbah
- Career Stats: 195 career games with 92 tries

== Representative games ==
- State of Origin: Played 11 games in total for New South Wales
- International: Played 11 tests for Australia including the 2000 World Cup

== The MAN Shake ==
In retirement, MacDougall, who has master's degrees in Business Administration and Business Coaching as well as a Bachelor of Economics, started a nutrition company called Cranky Health. Its flagship product is The MAN Shake, a meal replacement made specifically for men. The company also produces protein bars and meal replacement shakes for women called The Lady Shake.

In 2015, MacDougall released his first book with publisher Penguin Books called The Man Plan. The books promotes a healthy lifestyle for men, focusing on simple 10-minute workouts and easy to follow recipes. He also launched The Man Challenge, an online health and fitness program specifically created for the needs of men. The Man Challenge is built on the premise of exercising for just 10 minutes a day and giving men a simple to follow meal plan that still allows them to enjoy a beer and a burger. Also involved is AFL Premiership winning Coach Paul Roos who acts as a motivator for users of the program, while another feature includes taking on celebrity athletes such as Sonny Bill Williams to exercise challenges.
