= Josh Smith (rugby league, born 1979) =

Australian rugby league footballer

Personal information
- Full name: Josh Smith
- Born: 31 January 1979 (age 47)

Playing information
- Position: Wing
Club
Years	Team	Pld	T	G	FG	P
2000	Northern Eagles	3	1	0	0	4
2003	Newcastle Knights	7	0	0	0	0
	Total	10	1	0	0	4
- Source: As of 7 February 2019

Josh Smith is a former professional rugby league footballer who played in the 2000s. He played for the Northern Eagles in 2000 and the Newcastle Knights in 2003. Having won the 2001 NRL Premiership, the Knights traveled to England to play the 2002 World Club Challenge against Super League champions, the Bradford Bulls. Smith played on the wing and scored a try in Newcastle's loss.
