= Craig Hall (rugby league, born 1977) =

Australian rugby league footballer

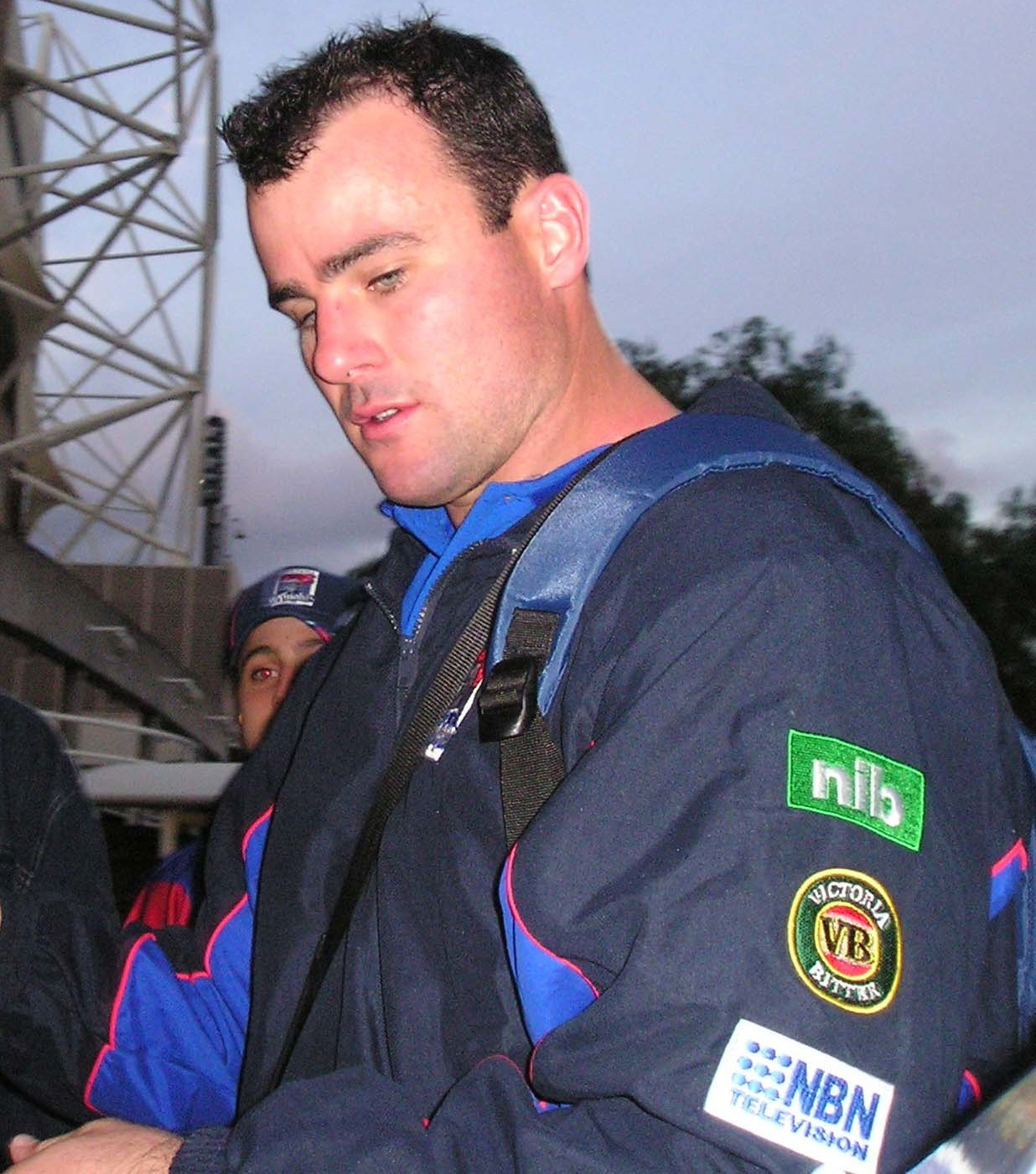

Personal information
- Full name: Craig Hall
- Born: 6 November 1977 (age 49) Hornsby, New South Wales, Australia

Playing information
- Position: Wing
Club
Years	Team	Pld	T	G	FG	P
2003–05	Newcastle Knights	39	18	0	0	72

Craig Hall (born 6 November 1977) is an Australian former professional rugby league footballer who played in the 2000s. He played in the National Rugby League for the Newcastle Knights between 2003 and 2005.

== Background ==
Hall was born in Hornsby, New South Wales and raised on the Sunshine Coast, Queensland, where he played his junior rugby league for the Caloundra Sharks.

== Playing career ==
Hall made his first grade debut for Newcastle against Parramatta in Round 3 2003. Hall played in the clubs 2003 elimination final loss against the Sydney Roosters.

In 2005, he was named in the Queensland's Emerging Origin squad in the pre-season but only managed to make 4 appearances in total as Newcastle finished last on the table claiming the wooden spoon. Hall's last game in first grade was a 50-0 loss against Parramatta in Round 14 2005.

In 2006, it was revealed that Hall was close to signing with English side Wakefield Trinity but the players transfer was cancelled after he suffered a serious knee injury in the 2005 off season.
