= Toby Winter =

Australian rugby league footballer

Personal information
- Born: 2 August 2007 (age 19) Newcastle, New South Wales, Australia
- Height: 183 cm (6 ft 0 in)
- Weight: 88 kg (13 st 12 lb)

Playing information
- Position: Centre, Fullback
Club
Years	Team	Pld	T	G	FG	P
2026–	Newcastle Knights	1	0	0	0	0
- Source: As of 16 August 2026

Toby Winter (born 2 August 2007) is an Australian professional rugby league footballer who plays as a centre and fullback for the Newcastle Knights in the National Rugby League.

== Background ==
Born in Newcastle, New South Wales, Winter played his junior rugby league for the Dudley-Redhead Magpies, before being signed by the Newcastle Knights.

== Playing career ==
=== Early years ===
Winter rose through the ranks for the Newcastle Knights, playing with their Harold Matthews Cup, S. G. Ball Cup and Jersey Flegg Cup teams from 2024. In 2025, he played for the Australian Schoolboys.

=== 2026 ===
In March, Winter had his contract with the Knights upgraded to include him in the side's NRL development list for the remainder of 2026 and 2027, before moving into the club's Top 30 squad in 2028 through to 2029. In June, he played for the New South Wales under-19s team.

In round 24 of the 2026 NRL season, he made his NRL debut for the Knights against the Gold Coast Titans.
