= Matt Parsons =

Australian rugby league footballer

Personal information
- Born: 18 June 1973 (age 52) Tamworth, New South Wales, Australia

Playing information
- Height: 201 cm (6 ft 7 in)
- Weight: 135 kg (21 st 4 lb)
- Position: Prop
Club
Years	Team	Pld	T	G	FG	P
1997–99	South Sydney	58	2	0	0	8
2000–04	Newcastle Knights	106	1	0	0	4
	Total	164	3	0	0	12
Representative
Years	Team	Pld	T	G	FG	P
2002	NSW Country	1	0	0	0	0

Matt Parsons (born 18 June 1973) is an Australian former professional rugby league footballer who played in the 1990s and 2000s. A Country New South Wales representative prop, he played his club football in the NRL for the South Sydney Rabbitohs and Newcastle Knights with whom he won the 2001 NRL Premiership.

== Background ==
Parsons played his junior rugby league for St. George and featured in the club's Jersey Flegg Cup and Under 21 teams before signing with South Sydney.

== Playing career ==
Parsons made his first grade debut for Souths in round 1 of the 1997 ARL season against the Illawarra Steelers which ended in a 50–10 loss at WIN Stadium. Parsons played for Souths in what was at the time to be their last game in the NRL when they played against Parramatta in round 26 1999 at Parramatta Stadium. At the end of the 1999 NRL season, Souths were controversially expelled from the competition as part of the NRL's rationalisation policy.

Parsons then joined Newcastle for the 2000 NRL season. He played in the club's preliminary final loss against the Sydney Roosters that year. Parsons played for the Newcastle Knights at prop forward in their 2001 NRL grand final victory over the Parramatta Eels.

Having won the 2001 NRL Premiership, Newcastle traveled to England to play the 2002 World Club Challenge against Super League champions, the Bradford Bulls. Parsons played as a prop forward in Newcastle's loss.
