= Rod Whitaker (rugby league) =

Australian rugby league footballer (born 1963)

Personal information
- Full name: Rodney Whitaker
- Born: 2 June 1963 (age 63)

Playing information
- Position: Wing
Club
| Years | Team | Pld | T | G | FG | P |
|---|---|---|---|---|---|---|
| 1988 | Newcastle Knights | 5 | 0 | 0 | 0 | 0 |
- Source: As of 5 February 2019

Rod Whitaker is an Australian former professional rugby league footballer. He was part of the inaugural Newcastle Knights squad in 1988.

== Background ==
Whitaker played in the local leagues with Cessnock before signing with Newcastle in 1988.

== Playing career ==
Whitaker made his first-grade debut for Newcastle in Round 1, 1988, against the Parramatta Eels in the club's inaugural match. Whitaker played four additional games for Newcastle. His last match in first grade was a 14–8 loss against the Penrith Panthers.
