= Rod Shoesmith =

Australian rugby league footballer

Personal information
- Full name: Rod Shoesmith

Playing information
- Position: Wing
Club
Years	Team	Pld	T	G	FG	P
1991	Newcastle Knights	4	1	0	0	4
- Source: As of 6 February 2019

Rod Shoesmith is a former professional rugby league footballer who played in the 1990s. He played for the Newcastle Knights in 1991.
