= Peter Graham (rugby league) =

Australian rugby league footballer

Personal information
- Full name: Peter Graham

Playing information
Club
| Years | Team | Pld | T | G | FG | P |
|---|---|---|---|---|---|---|
| 1991 | Newcastle Knights | 1 | 0 | 0 | 0 | 0 |
- Source: As of 14 Jul 2021

Peter Graham is an Australian former professional rugby league footballer who played in the 1990s. He played for the Newcastle Knights in 1991.
