= Ben MacDougall =

Scotland international rugby union & league footballer

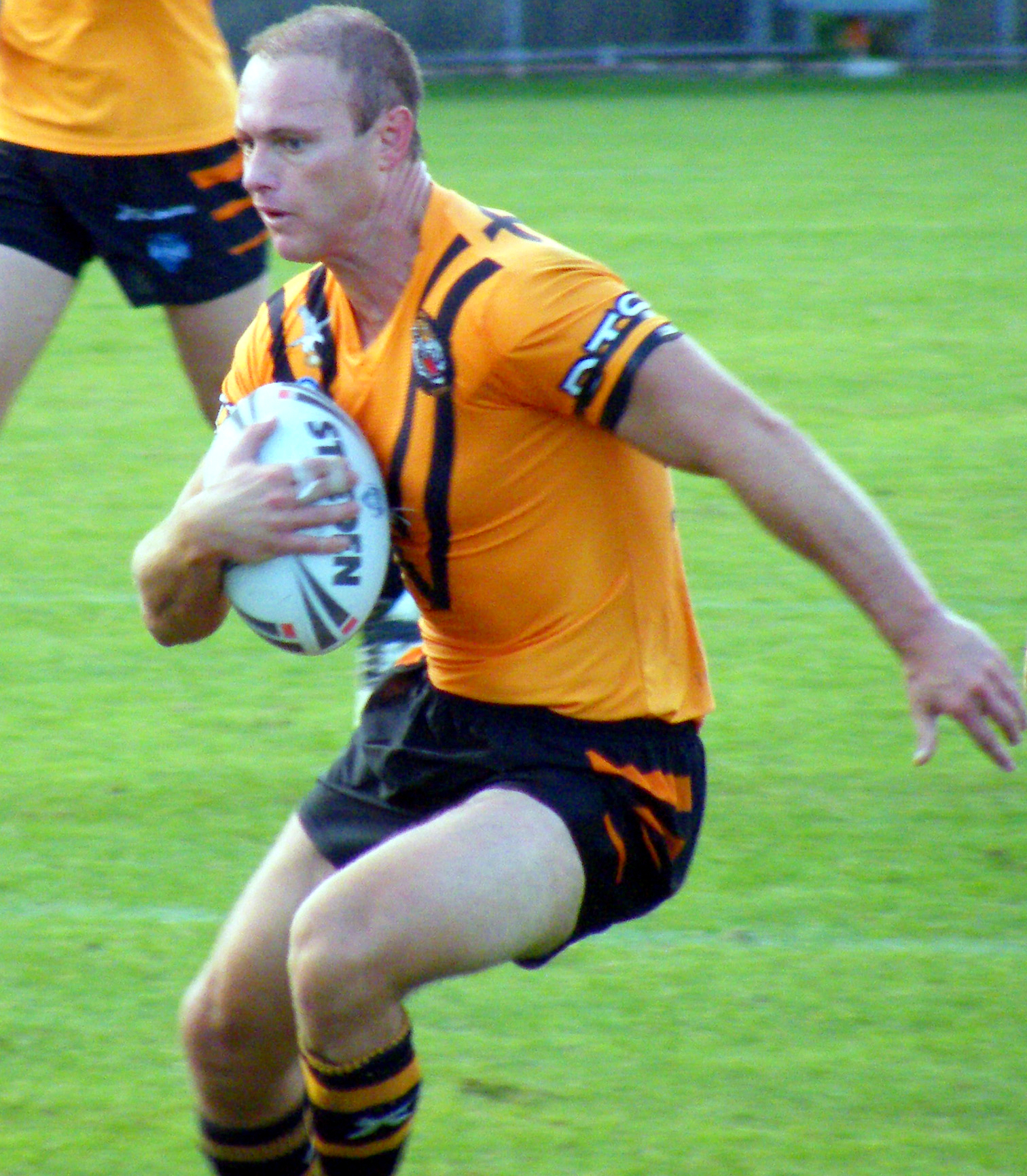

Personal information
- Full name: Benjamin MacDougall
- Born: 25 May 1977 (age 49) Sydney, New South Wales, Australia

Playing information
- Height: 193 cm (6 ft 4 in)
- Weight: 92 kg (14 st 7 lb)

Rugby league
- Position: Centre
Club
Years	Team	Pld	T	G	FG	P
1998	Western Suburbs	3	0	0	0	0
2000	Newcastle Knights	2	0	0	0	0
2001–02	Northern Eagles	31	10	0	0	40
2003	Manly Sea Eagles	23	8	0	0	32
2004	Melbourne Storm	22	7	0	0	28
	Total	81	25	0	0	100

Rugby union
- Position: Outside Back
Club
Years	Team	Pld	T	G	FG	P
2004–05	Edinburgh	11	4
2005–07	Border Reivers	7	5
2010–11	London Scottish	28	4
	Total	46	13	0	0	0
Representative
Years	Team	Pld	T	G	FG	P
2006	Scotland	2	0	0	0	0
- Father: Gil MacDougall
- Relatives: Luke MacDougall (brother); Adam MacDougall (brother)

Ben MacDougall (born 25 May 1977) is a former professional rugby footballer of the 1990s, 2000s and 2010s. After playing rugby league in Australia for the Western Suburbs Magpies, Newcastle Knights, Manly Warringah Sea Eagles and Melbourne Storm, he started playing rugby union in the United Kingdom, and represented Scotland internationally.

== Background ==
Born in Sydney, New South Wales, Ben MacDougall has three siblings, Adam MacDougall, Luke MacDougall and Scott MacDougall, all three of whom would also become rugby league players, and son of former NRL player Gil MacDougall

== Playing career ==
MacDougall made his first grade debut for the Western Suburbs Magpies in round 6 of the 1998 NRL season. He joined the Newcastle Knights in the 2000 season. In 2001-2002 he played for the Northern Eagles who then reverted to the Manly Sea Eagles in 2003.

He played rugby union in Scotland for three years from 2004 to 2007, representing the Scotland national rugby union team. MacDougall qualified for Scotland through his grandfather, Alan, who came from Glasgow.He made his Scotland debut against Wales on 12 February 2006 in a 2006 Six Nations Championship match at the Millennium Stadium.

MacDougall joined Edinburgh Rugby in 2004 and in 2006 moved to the Border Reivers. MacDougall joined London Scottish in the 2010/11 season and helped them win the RFU National One trophy and get promoted into the RFU The Championship for the 2011/2012 season.

Before departing for Scotland in 2005, MacDougall played for the Western Suburbs Magpies, the Newcastle Knights, the Northern Eagles, the Manly-Warringah Sea Eagles and the Melbourne Storm in the National Rugby League.

== Career highlights ==
- First Grade Debut: 1998 - Round 6, Western Suburbs vs South Sydney Rabbitohs at Aussie Stadium, 19 April
- International Debut (RU): 2006 - Scotland vs Wales at Cardiff, 12 February in the Six Nations Championship
