= Matthew Kennedy (rugby league) =

Australian rugby league footballer

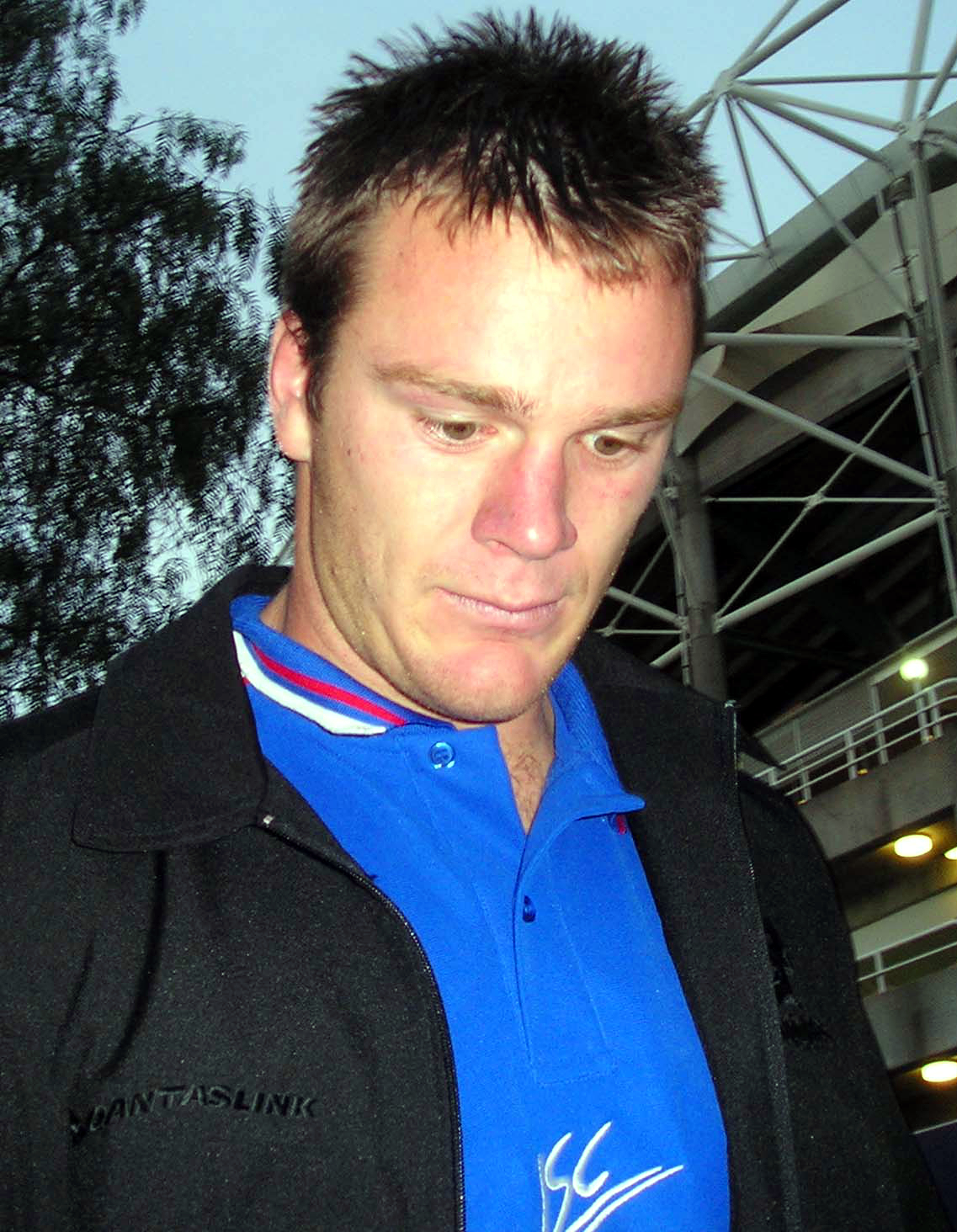

Personal information
- Full name: Matthew Kennedy
- Born: 13 February 1981 (age 45) Nambour, Queensland, Australia

Playing information
- Height: 187 cm (6 ft 2 in)
- Weight: 104 kg (16 st 5 lb)
- Position: Prop, Second-row
Club
Years	Team	Pld	T	G	FG	P
2003–05	Newcastle Knights	45	4	0	0	8

Matthew Kennedy is an Australian former professional rugby league footballer who played for the Newcastle Knights in the 2000s. He last played for the Western Suburbs Rosellas of the Newcastle Rugby League.

== Playing career ==
Kennedy made his first grade debut for Newcastle against the Sydney Roosters in round 2 of the 2003 NRL season. Kennedy played 16 games in his debut season including the 36-8 qualifying loss against the same opponents.

In 2005, Kennedy was one of 11 players fined by the club for misconduct after a pre-season game in Bathurst.

It was alleged that some of the Newcastle players had broken curfew to visit dormitories at Charles Sturt University. It was reported that one of the players had jumped on a student as she slept in her bed and touched her inappropriately. One of the Newcastle players Dane Tilse was deregistered by the NRL for 12 months.

2005 would also be Kennedy's last season in first grade. Kennedy made 8 appearances that season (All of them losses) as Newcastle claimed the wooden spoon after finishing bottom of the table.
