= Dean Byrne (rugby league) =

Australian rugby league footballer

Personal information
- Born: 21 October 1981 (age 44) Kogarah, New South Wales, Australia

Playing information
- Position: Halfback, Five-eighth
Club
Years	Team	Pld	T	G	FG	P
2003	St. George Illawarra	6	2	3	0	14
2004	South Sydney	1	0	2	0	4
	Total	7	2	5	0	18
Representative
Years	Team	Pld	T	G	FG	P
2003	NSW Residents	1	0	2	0	4

Dean Byrne (born 21 October 1981) is an Australian former professional rugby league footballer who played in the 2000s, he played in the National Rugby League (NRL) for the St. George Illawarra Dragons and South Sydney Rabbitohs.

A product of the Peakhurst Hawks, Byrne's career was curtailed by a serious leg injury that forced his premature retirement in 2004. Byrne has played Oztag at representative level, and has been picked to represent Australia on many occasions.
