= Brad Smith (rugby league) =

Australian rugby league footballer

Personal information
- Full name: Brad Smith
- Born: 27 September 1975 (age 49)

Playing information
- Position: Second-row
Club
Years	Team	Pld	T	G	FG	P
1995–98	St. George Dragons	27	2	0	0	8
1999	Balmain Tigers	11	1	0	0	4
	Total	38	3	0	0	12

Brad Smith (born 27 September 1975) is an Australian former professional rugby league footballer who played in the 1990s.

== Background ==
Smith played his junior rugby league at Hurstville United.

== Playing career ==
Smith started his career at the St. George Dragons, his local club, in the 1995 ARL season. His debut was from the bench, playing in a 25–12 win against the Western Suburbs Magpies in round 16. He played there for four years, predominantly off the bench. His first try was against the Gold Coast Chargers in a 18–12 win in round 4 of the 1997 ARL season. He scored again later that season against the North Sydney Bears in a 54–14 loss three weeks later.

In 1999, he moved to the Balmain Tigers. He scored on his club debut against the Melbourne Storm in a 16–6 win in round 2 of the 1999 NRL season.
