= Todd Polglase =

Australian rugby league footballer

Personal information
- Born: 21 March 1981 (age 45) Cessnock, New South Wales, Australia

Playing information
- Position: Fullback
Club
Years	Team	Pld	T	G	FG	P
2002–03	Canterbury Bulldogs	3	1	0	0	4
2004–06	South Sydney	38	10	0	0	40
2007	Newcastle Knights	7	3	0	0	12
	Total	48	14	0	0	56

Todd Polglase (born 21 March 1981) is an Australian former professional rugby league footballer. He played for the Canterbury-Bankstown Bulldogs, South Sydney Rabbitohs and Newcastle Knights in the National Rugby League competition.

== Early life ==
Polglase was born in Cessnock and raised in Pelaw Main, New South Wales, Australia, and played his junior rugby league for the Kurri Kurri Bulldogs.

== Playing career ==
Polglase made his first grade debut for Canterbury against his boyhood club Newcastle in the 2002 NRL season. Polglase mainly played reserve grade during his time with Canterbury before transferring to South Sydney. Polglase played three seasons at Souths, two of those finished with the club coming last and earning the Wooden Spoon. In 2007, Polglase signed with Newcastle and only managed to play one season for the club before retiring due to a recurring hamstring injury.
