= Adam Wheeler (rugby league) =

Australian rugby league footballer

Personal information
- Born: 3 April 1980 (age 44); Sydney, New South Wales, Australia

Playing information
- Position: Prop
Club
Years	Team	Pld	T	G	FG	P
2000	Parramatta Eels	1	0	0	0	0

Adam Wheeler (born 3 April 1980) is an Australian former professional rugby league footballer who played as a prop for the Parramatta Eels in the NRL in 2000.

== Playing career ==
A Camden junior, Wheeler captained the Parramatta Eels in his side's 28–12 loss to the North Sydney Bears in the 1998 Jersey Flegg Cup. He made his first grade appearance from the bench in his sides' 32−24 victory over the St George Illawarra Dragons at the Sydney Football Stadium in round 26 of the 2000 season.
