= Justin Ryder =

Australian rugby league footballer

Personal information
- Full name: Justin Ryder
- Born: 14 July 1980 (age 46) Nepean, New South Wales, Australia

Playing information
- Position: Wing
Club
Years	Team	Pld	T	G	FG	P
2000–02	Newcastle Knights	27	9	0	0	36
2004	Wakefield Trinity Wildcats	22	11	0	0	44
	Total	49	20	0	0	80

Justin Ryder (born 14 July 1980 in Nepean), also known by the nickname of Knight Rider, is an Australian former professional rugby league footballer who played in the 2000s. He played at club level for Newcastle Knights and Wakefield Trinity Wildcats, as a wing.
