= Nathan Barnes =

Australian rugby league footballer

Personal information
- Full name: Nathan Barnes
- Born: 22 July 1975 (age 50) Sydney, New South Wales, Australia

Playing information
- Position: Centre, Fullback, Wing
Club
Years	Team	Pld	T	G	FG	P
1992–93	Penrith	12	2	0	0	8
1994–95	Newcastle Knights	41	18	0	0	72
1996–99	Parramatta	69	20	1	0	82
2000	Canberra	1	0	0	0	0
	Total	123	40	1	0	162
- Source: As of 18 January 2019

Nathan Barnes (born 22 July 1975) is a former professional rugby league footballer who played in the 1990s and 2000s. Barnes played for the Penrith Panthers from 1992 to 1993, the Newcastle Knights from 1994 to 1995, the Parramatta Eels from 1996 to 1999 and finally the Canberra Raiders in 2000.

== Playing career ==
Barnes made his first grade debut for Penrith in 1992. After spending 2 years with Penrith, Barnes signed with Newcastle for the 1994 season. Barnes was a regular starter for Newcastle in his 2 seasons with the club but missed out on playing in the 1995 finals series.

In 1996, Barnes joined Parramatta and in 1997 played in the club first finals campaign since 1987. Parramatta went on to lose both matches against Newcastle and North Sydney. In 1998, Parramatta finished 4th on the table and Barnes played in their finals' victory over Norths but missed out on playing in the clubs other 2 finals games against Brisbane and Canterbury.

In 1999, Barnes only made 10 appearances for Parramatta and was released at the end of the season. In 2000, Barnes joined Canberra and played only one game for the club which in turn proved to be his last in first grade, which was a 22–8 victory over the now defunct Northern Eagles.

== Post playing ==
After retiring from the National Rugby League, Barnes filled the captain / coach role at Windsor Wolves in the Jim Beam New South Wales Cup from 2002 to 2005.
