= Peter Malcolm (rugby league) =

Australian rugby league footballer

Personal information
- Full name: Peter Malcolm

Playing information
- Position: Hooker
Club
Years	Team	Pld	T	G	FG	P
1988	Newcastle Knights	2	0	0	0	0
- Source: As of 5 February 2019

Peter Malcolm is an Australian former professional rugby league footballer, who played in the 1980s. He made two appearances in 1988 as hooker for the Newcastle Knights, New South Wales of the National Rugby League.

== Playing career ==
Malcolm made his first grade debut for Newcastle in Round 2 1988 during the club's inaugural season. Malcolm played from the bench as the club recorded their first ever victory defeating Western Suburbs 20–16. Malcolm made his final appearance in first grade against Balmain in Round 18 1988 which ended in an 18–16 loss.
