= Todd Bates (rugby league) =

Australian rugby league footballer

Personal information
- Full name: Todd Bates
- Born: 2 March 1983 (age 43)
- Height: 173 cm (5 ft 8 in)
- Weight: 99 kg (218 lb; 15 st 8 lb)

Playing information
- Position: Halfback
Club
Years	Team	Pld	T	G	FG	P
2003	Newcastle Knights	4	1	0	0	4
- Source: As of 7 February 2019

Todd Bates (born 2 March 1983) is an Australian former professional rugby league footballer who played in the 2000s. He played for the Newcastle Knights in 2003.

Post Rugby League career Todd forged a successful career in the mining industry with UGM Mining Services.
