= Trent Salkeld =

Australian rugby league footballer

Personal information
- Full name: Trent Salkeld
- Born: 20 August 1981 (age 45)

Playing information
- Position: Wing
Club
Years	Team	Pld	T	G	FG	P
2005	Newcastle Knights	17	10	0	0	40
- Source: As of 15 Jul 2021

Trent Salkeld is an Australian former professional rugby league footballer who played in the 2000s. He played for the Newcastle Knights in the NRL competition.

== Playing career ==
Salkeld made his first grade debut for Newcastle against South Sydney in round 5 of the 2005 NRL season. In one match, he scored three tries against the Sydney Roosters but the Novocastrians lost the match 28–14. Salkeld finished the season as the club's second highest try scorer but it wasn't enough to stop Newcastle finishing with their first Wooden Spoon. Salkeld was later forced into an early retirement due to nephrotic syndrome, which caused his kidneys to operate at just 60 per cent of their capacity.
