= List of Women's Interstate Challenge results =

Women's Interstate Challenge (1999–2017)

The Women's Interstate Challenge (Note: Although referred to as State of Origin in some contemporary sources, at the time eligibility for players was based on residency.) was the predecessor to the Women's State of Origin; an annual competition between the Australian state representative sides of New South Wales and Queensland. It was first contested in 1999 and from 2005 the teams played for the Nellie Doherty Cup. In the 2018 season the competition was rebranded by the NRL as the Women's State of Origin.

The following article summarises the results of the competition before its 2018 rebranding: (Note: Information for some fixtures is incomplete as accurate records were not kept in early years of the Women's Interstate Challenge by either the QRL or the NSWRL. In 2018, a list of players published by the NSWRL noted several gaps in their records. The spelling of some names varies between sources and from those given on the Queensland and NSW lists of representatives)

== 1999 ==
The 1999 game was played as a curtain raiser to the Round 18 NRL game between the Brisbane Broncos and Balmain Tigers.

Sunday, 4 July 1999

Queensland	18 – 16	New South Wales
Tries: 4 Tracey Thompson (2); Teresa Anderson; Sharon Mitchell-Cowen; Goals: 1 Karen Shaw	1st: 6–6; 2nd: 12–10	Tries: 3 Nicky Richards; Tahnee Norris; Natalie Dwyer; Goals: 2 Natalie Dwyer (2)

ANZ Stadium, Brisbane

Team details
Queensland		Position	New South Wales
Name	Number	Position	Number	Name
Erica Ross	1	FB	1	Loretta O'Neill
Teresa Anderson	2	WG	2	Sue Osborn
Karen Shaw	3	CE	3	Alyssa Campbell
Tammy Pohatu	4	CE	4	Caryl Jarrett
Tracey Thompson	5	WG	5	Viola Dilol
Karyn Murphy (c)	6	FE	6	Natalie Dwyer
Annie Banks	7	HB	7	Tarsha Gale
Debbie Merritt	8	PR	8	Kylie Mackay
Karen Stuart	9	HK	9	Katrina Moss
Kellie Batchelor	10	PF	10	Casey Manning
Kirsty Taylor	11	SR	11	Kelly Chessor
Veronica White	12	SR	12	Tahnee Norris
Jodie Billing	13	LK	13	Nicky Richards
Kerri Shiplock	14	IN	14	Kylie Egan
Megan Stiller	15	IN	15	Jenny Starr
Gina Sterling	16	IN	16	Simone Taylor
Debbie Mulhern	17	IN	17	Kiri Olsen
Sharon Mitchell-Cowan	18	-
Tony Ashton		Coach

== 2001 ==
Sunday, 22 July 2001

Queensland	34 – 14	New South Wales

ANZ Stadium, Brisbane

== 2002 ==
The 2002 game was used as part of the selection process for the squad to face the Great Britain tourists.

Sunday, 23 June 2002

Queensland	26 – 16	New South Wales

Brisbane

== 2004 ==
In 2004, the competition was played as a two-game series which was won 2–0 by Queensland. The first game was played as a curtain raiser to the ARL Foundation U15s grand final and the Round 20 NRL game between the Brisbane Broncos and Manly Warringah Sea Eagles.

Saturday, 24 July 2004

Queensland	40 – 8	New South Wales

Suncorp Stadium, Brisbane

Saturday, 31 July 2004

New South Wales	8 – 32	Queensland
	1st: 8–8; 2nd: 0–24

EnergyAustralia Stadium, Newcastle

== 2005 ==
In the ARL 2004 annual report, the 2025 competition was scheduled to be a two-game series played in Brisbane and Sydney. A single match was played in which the teams competed for the inaugural Nellie Doherty Cup.

Saturday, 6 August 2005

New South Wales	18 – 20 (Note: The ARL 2005 annual report gives the score as NSW 20–22 QLD,)	Queensland
Tries: ? Goals: ?		Tries: ? Tahnee Norris; Goals: ?

Henson Park, Marrickville

== 2006 ==
The 2006 game was played as a curtain raiser to the Round 21 NRL game between the Brisbane Broncos and Wests Tigers.

Sunday, 30 July 2006
12.15 AEST

Queensland	40 – 24	New South Wales
Tries: 7 Steph Hancock (2); Leah Williams (2); Teresa Anderson; Karyn Murphy; Megan Spicer; Goals: 6 Neena Fraser (4); Steph Hancock; Megan Spicer	1st: 16–10; 2nd: 24–14	Tries: 4 Teina Clark; Dahlia Tahu; Nadine Schmidt; Johnnie Tukwaho; Goals: 4 Teina Clark (4)

Suncorp Stadium, Brisbane
Player of the Match: Steph Hancock

Team details
Queensland		Position	New South Wales
Name	Number	Position	Number	Name
Teresa Anderson	1	FB	1	Tiana Wynard
Megan Spicer	2	WG	2	Chelsea Petroux
Jaye Christensen	3	CE	3	Dahlia Tahu
Carolyn White	4	CE	4	Teina Clark
Tammy Cole	5	WG	5	Sandy Scott
Erin Elliott	6	FE	6	Belinda Holmes
Karyn Murphy (c)	7	HB	7	Sue Curtis
Leah Williams	8	PR	8	Chloe Caldwell
Rebecca Jones	9	HK	9	Sandra Laughlin
Neena Fraser	10	PF	10	Karol Tanevesi
Melissa Edwards	11	SR	11	Johnnie Tukwaho
Tahnee Norris (vc)	12	SR	12	Kylie Pennell (c)
Steph Hancock	13	LK	13	Farlane Wineera
Jenny Pope	14	IN	14	Katrina Fanning (vc)
Anne Marie Bukri	15	IN	15	Nadine Schmidt (Note: A 2018 NSWRL article lists Joy Mauga instead of Nadine Schmidt)
Jasmine Green	16	IN	16	Natalie Bell
Kerryanne Stead	17	IN	17	Shellie Brown
		Coach		Ray Windle

== 2007 ==
The game was played as a curtain raiser to the Round 22 NRL game between the Penrith Panthers and North Queensland Cowboys.

Monday, 13 August 2007
15.30 AEST

New South Wales	16 – 38	Queensland
Tries: ? Goals: ?	1st: 10–12; 2nd: 6–26	Tries: 7 Rachele Whelan (2); Bianca Ambrum; Teresa Anderson; Kellie Batchelor; Suzanne Johnson; Leah Williams; Goals: 5 Kellie Batchelor (5)

CUA Stadium, Penrith

Team details
New South Wales		Position	Queensland
Name	Number	Position	Number	Name
	1	FB	1	Jasmine Green
	2	WG	2	Megan Spicer
	3	CE	3	Casey Watkins
	4	CE	4	Suzanne Johnson
	5	WG	5	Rachele Whelan
	6	FE	6	Erin Elliott
	7	HB	7	Teresa Anderson
	8	PR	8	Leah Williams
	9	HK	9	Tooa Nanai
	10	PF	10	Bianca Ambrum
	11	SR	11	Kellie Batchelor
	12	SR	12	Hayley Vankempen
	13	LK	13	Tahnee Norris (c)
		IN	14	Alisha Creed
		IN	15	Melissa Edwards
		IN	16	Tania Davis
		IN	17	Alex Robertson
		Coach		Karen Stuart

== 2008 ==
In 2008, the competition was played as a two-game series which was won 2–0 by Queensland. The Australia squad for the 2008 World Cup was announced following the second game.

Tuesday, 8 July 2008
16.00 AEST

New South Wales	6 – 8	Queensland
Tries: 1 Jessica Palmer; Goals: 1 Teina Clark		Tries: 2 Steph Hancock; Tegan Rolfe

CUA Stadium, Penrith
Player of the Match: Renae Kunst

Team details
New South Wales		Position	Queensland
Name	Number	Position	Number	Name
Jamie Blazenewski (vc)	1	FB	1	Erin Elliott
Natalie Levi	2	WG	2	Therese Aiton
Elianna Wilson	3	CE	3	Tegan Rolfe
Lisa Fiaola (c)	4	CE	4	Steph Hancock
Melissa Khoury	5	WG	5	Suzanne Johnson
Teina Clark	6	FE	6	Karyn Murphy
Denise McGrath	7	HB	7	Teresa Anderson (c)
Shellie Brown	8	PR	8	Tracey Bailey
Jessica Palmer	9	HK	9	Tarah Westera
Kylie Pennell	10	PF	10	Neena Fraser
Nutta Ahipene	11	SR	11	Amie Solomona
Chris Ross	12	SR	12	Renae Kunst
Bronwyn McIntosh	13	LK	13	Deanna Turner
Caroline Layat	14	IN	14	Naomi Bobongie
Dahlia Tahu	15	IN	15	Bianca Ambrum
Joy Mauga	16	IN	16	Anne Marie Burki
Margaret Learasa	17	IN	17	Leah Williams
		R	18	Ashley Oberleuter
Mel Vayro		Coach		Gordon Robson
(Note: The QRL Brolgas website gives alternative numbering for the Queensland team, but positions are unchanged)

Saturday, 9 August 2008
17.00 AEST

Queensland	46 – 4	New South Wales
Tries: 10; Bianca Ambrum (3); Suzanne Johnson (2); Tarah Westera (2); Tegan Rolfe; Renae Kunst; Steph Hancock; Goals: 3 Steph Hancock (3)	1st: 26–0; 2nd: 20–4	Tries: 1 Lisa Fiaola

Kougari Oval, Brisbane
Attendance: 800

== 2009 ==
The Australia squad for the 2009 tour of New Zealand was announced the week after the game.

Saturday, 18 July 2009
13.40 AEST

New South Wales	14 – 20	Queensland
Tries: 3 Poihaera Clark; Natalie Levi; Jessica Palmer; Goals: 1 Renee Gloss		Tries: 4 Erin Elliott; Tahnee Norris; Nive Moefaauo; Tarah Westera; Goals: 2 Natalie Dwyer; Tegan Rolfe

CUA Stadium, Penrith
Player of the Match: Tahnee Norris

== 2010 ==
Saturday, 26 June 2010

Queensland	36–6	New South Wales
Tries: 7 Latisha Gary (2); Tegan Rolfe (2); Karina Brown; Natalie Dwyer; Suzanne Johnson; Goals: 4 Natalie Dwyer (4)	1st: 20–0; 2nd: 16–6	Tries: 1 Kylie Hilder; Goals: 1 Teina Clark

Albert Park, Gympie
Referee: Jon Kennedy
Player of the Match: Latisha Gary

== 2011 ==
The 2011 game was played as a curtain raiser to Game I of the 2011 State of Origin series.

Wednesday, 25 May 2011

Queensland	26 – 0	New South Wales
Tries: 6 Bianca Ambrum; Natasha Baggow; Natalie Dwyer; Natalie Gala; Steph Hancock; Karyn Murphy; Goals: 1 Natalie Dwyer	1st: 14–0; 2nd: 12–0

Suncorp Stadium, Brisbane

== 2012 ==
Saturday, 23 June 2012
15.00 AEST

New South Wales	10–34	Queensland
Tries: 2 Sam Hammond; Tarah Westera; Goals: 1 Maddie Studdon	1st: 10–16; 2nd: 0–18	Tries: 8 Bianca Ambrum (4); Natalie Dwyer (2); Karina Brown; Karyn Murphy; Goals: 1 Amber Saltner

Centrebet Stadium, Penrith
Player of the Match: Heather Ballinger

== 2013 ==
Sunday, 7 April 2013

Queensland	30 – 12	New South Wales
Tries: 6 Bianca Ambrum; Jo Barrett; Steph Hancock; Renae Kunst; Tahnee Norris; Amber Saltner; Goals: 3 Amber Saltner (3)	1st: 10–6; 2nd: 20–6	Tries: 2 Tegan Chandler (2); Goals: 2 Margaret Watson (2)

Davies Park, Brisbane
Player of the Match: Steph Hancock

Team details
Queensland		Position	New South Wales
Name	Number	Position	Number	Name
Teresa Anderson	1	FB	(Note: team list gives NSW team in alphabetical order)	Hariata Ahipene
Bianca Ambrum	2	WG		Emily Andrews
Jo Barrett	3	CE		Katrina Barker
Tegan Rolfe	4	CE		Tegan Chandler
Amber Saltner	5	WG		Eunice Grimes
Ali Brigginshaw	6	FE		Sam Hammond
Karyn Murphy (c)	7	HB		Victoria Latu
Natalie Dwyer	8	PR		Jessica Palmer
Heather Ballinger	9	HK		Hanna Sio
Steph Hancock	10	PF		Alex Sulusi
Renae Kunst	11	SR		Dahlia Tahu
Deanna Turner	12	SR		Emma Tonegato
Tahnee Norris	13	LK		Eilianna Watson
Jenni-Sue Hoepper	14	IN		Margaret Watson
Nichole Richards	15	IN		Tarah Westera
Millie Edwards	16	IN		Emma Young
Kaitlin Moss	17	IN		Julie Young
		-		Rebecca Young
Brad Donald		Coach		Daniel Lacy

== 2014 ==
The 2014 game was used as a squad selection game for the Australia team to play New Zealand later in the year.

Saturday, 19 July 2014

New South Wales	10 – 26	Queensland
Tries: 2 Kezie Apps; Teina Clark; Goals: 1 Maddie Studdon	1st: 0–16; 2nd: 10–10	Tries: 5 Steph Hancock; Kellye Hodges; Jenni-Sue Hoepper; Renae Kunst; Deanna Turner; Goals: 3 Ali Brigginshaw (2); Jenni-Sue Hoepper

Leichhardt Oval, Sydney
Player of the Match: Renae Kunst

Team details
New South Wales		Position	Queensland
Name	Number	Position	Number	Name
Kezie Apps	(Note: team list gives NSW team in alphabetical order)	FB	1	Latisha Gary
Charlette Butler		WG	2	Kellye Hodges
Teina Clark		CE	3	Annette Brander
Ruby Ewe		CE	4	Jenni-Sue Hoepper
Vanessa Foliaki		WG	5	Kady Tinker
Sam Hammond		FE	6	Ali Brigginshaw
Jennifer Latu		HB	7	Karyn Murphy
Chloe Leaupepe		PR	8	Steph Hancock
Sharon McGrady		HK	9	Brittany Breayley
Denise McGrath		PF	10	Heather Ballinger
Hanna Sio		SR	11	Renae Kunst
Ruan Sims		SR	12	Deanna Turner
Maddie Studdon		LK	13	Tarah Westera
Alex Sulusi		IN	14	Talia Poutini-Lawrence
Dahlia Tahu		IN	15	Nicole Richards
Simaima Taufu-Kautai		IN	16	Teri Nukunuku
Elianna Walton		IN	17	Jazmyn Taumafai
Margaret Watson		-	18	Aleasha Brider
Mathew Head		Coach		Brad Donald

== 2015 ==
The 2015 game was played as a curtain raiser to the Round 16 NRL game between the North Queensland Cowboys and Cronulla-Sutherland Sharks.

Saturday, 27 June 2015

Queensland	4 – 4	New South Wales
Tries: 1 Chelsea Baker	1st: 4–0; 2nd: 0–4	Tries: 1 Isabelle Kelly

1300SMILES Stadium, Townsville
Player of the Match: Simaima Taufa

Team details
Queensland		Position	New South Wales
Name	Number	Position	Number	Name
Karina Brown	1	FB	1	Sam Hammond
Chelsea Baker	2	WG	2	Shani Sleeman
Kody House	3	CE	3	Mahalia Murphy
Annette Brander	4	CE	4	Corban McGregor
Latoya Billy	5	WG	5	Isabelle Kelly
Jenni-Sue Hoepper	6	FE	6	Allana Ferguson
Courtney Lockwood	7	HB	7	Chloe Leaupepe
Steph Hancock (c)	8	PR	8	Elianna Walton
Brittany Breayley	9	HK	9	Charmayne Nathan
Heather Ballinger	10	PF	10	Ruan Sims
Renae Kunst	11	SR	11	Kezie Apps
Carly Bell	12	SR	12	Vanessa Foliaki
Tarah Westera	13	LK	13	Simaima Taufa
Casey Karklis	14	IN	14	Cobie-Jane Morgan
Jazmyn Taumafai	15	IN	15	Alexandra Sulusi
Florence Faamita	16	IN	16	Rebecca Young
Sarah Walker	17	IN	17	Jen Latu
Jessica Gracie	18	-	18	Jasmin Allende
Mathew Head		Coach		Brad Donald

== 2016 ==
The 2016 game was played as a triple-header with the a Holden Cup match and the Round 20 NRL game between the Gold Coast Titans and Parramatta Eels.

Saturday, 23 July 2016
15.10 AEST

Queensland	4 – 8	New South Wales
Tries: 1 Ali Brigginshaw 79'	1st: 0–0; 2nd: 4–8	Tries: 1 Simaima Taufa 52'; Goals: 2 Maddie Studdon 54', pen 76'

Cbus Super Stadium, Gold Coast
Referee: Jakson Shearer
Player of the Match: Kezie Apps

Team details
Queensland		Position	New South Wales
Name	Number	Position	Number	Name
Karina Brown	1	FB	1	Sam Bremner
Chelsea Baker	2	WG	2	Isabelle Kelly
Annette Brander	3	CE	3	Corban McGregor
Amelia Kuk	4	CE	4	Caitlin Moran
Kody House	5	WG	5	Nakia Davis-Welsh
Ali Brigginshaw	6	FE	6	Allana Ferguson
Courtney Lockwood	7	HB	7	Maddie Studdon
Heather Ballinger	10	PR	8	Ruan Sims
Brittany Breayley-Nati	9	HK	9	Rebecca Riley
Selena Tranter	16	PF	10	Elianna Walton
Renae Kunst	11	SR	11	Kezie Apps
Tazmin Gray	12	SR	12	Vanessa Foliaki
Rona Peters	13	LK	13	Simaima Taufa
Steph Hancock	8	IN	14	Lavina O'Mealey
Libby Cook-Black	14	IN	15	Jenifer Latu
Stefanie Gallagher	15	IN	16	Jasmin Allende
Tegan Rolfe	17	IN	17	Rebecca Young
Brad Donald		Coach		Ben Cross

== 2017 ==
The 2017 game was played as the first game of a double-header with the Round 20 NRL game between St George Illawarra Dragons and Manly Warringah Sea Eagles. It was the first women's match to use NRL Bunker technology.

Sunday, 23 July 2017

New South Wales	22 – 6	Queensland
Tries: 5 Jessica Sergis 6', 11', 61'; Corban McGregor 51'; Vanessa Foliaki 55'; Goals: 1 Caitlin Moran 12'	1st: 10–6; 2nd: 12–0	Tries: 1 Jenni-Sue Hoepper 21'; Goals: 1 Chelsea Baker 23'

WIN Stadium, Wollongong
Referee: Chris Treneman
Player of the Match: Kezie Apps

Team details
New South Wales		Position	Queensland
Name	Number	Position	Number	Name
Sam Bremner	1	FB	1	Karina Brown
Jessica Sergis	2	WG	2	Chelsea Baker
Corban McGregor	3	CE	3	Amelia Kuk
Isabelle Kelly	4	CE	4	Jenni-Sue Hoepper
Nakia Davis-Welsh	5	WG	5	Courtney Robinson
Caitlin Moran	6	FE	6	Zahara Temara
Maddie Studdon	7	HB	7	Ali Brigginshaw
Ruan Sims	8	PR	8	Steph Hancock
Rebecca Riley	9	HK	9	Brittany Breayley-Nati
Elianna Walton	10	PF	10	Heather Ballinger
Kezie Apps	11	SR	11	Renae Kunst
Talesha O'Neill	12	SR	12	Tazmin Gray
Simaima Taufa	13	LK	13	Rona Peters
Lavina O'Mealey	14	IN	14	Sasha Mahuika
Rebecca Young	15	IN	15	Kody House
Ruby Ewe	16	IN	16	Asipau Mafi
Vanessa Foliaki	17	IN	17	Chelsea Lenarduzzi
Ben Cross		Coach		Adrian Vowles
