= 2018 Women's State of Origin =

New South Wales	Queensland
16	10
	1	2	Total
NSW	6	10	16
QLD	6	4	10
- Date: 22 June 2018
- Stadium: North Sydney Oval
- Location: Sydney, New South Wales, Australia
- Nellie Doherty Medal: Isabelle Kelly
- Referees: Jon Stone, Peter Gough
- Attendance: 6,824

Broadcast partners
- Broadcasters: Nine Network (Live) Fox League (Live)

The 2018 Women's State of Origin was the first State of Origin rugby league match between the New South Wales and Queensland women's teams played at North Sydney Oval on 22 June 2018.

The game was the first played under the State of Origin banner. Prior to 2018, the teams played each other annually in the Women's Interstate Challenge before being rebranded as State of Origin. New South Wales defeated Queensland 16–10 to record their third straight win over the Maroons. New South Wales centre Isabelle Kelly was awarded the Nellie Doherty Medal for Player of the Match.

== Background ==
On 6 December 2017, the National Rugby League announced that the Women's Interstate Challenge, which ran from 1999 to 2017, would be rebranded as the Women's State of Origin. The game which, was previously played as a curtain-raiser, would now be a standalone fixture broadcast on the Nine Network and Fox Sports.

== Match summary ==
Friday, 22 June
7:40 pm (AEDT)

New South Wales	16 – 10	Queensland
Tries: 3 Isabelle Kelly 7', 54'; Nakia Davis-Welsh 36'; Goals: 2 Maddie Studdon (2/3) 9', 55'	1st: 6–6; 2nd: 10–4; Highlights; Match Stats (NRL); Report	Tries: 2 Karina Brown 12', 45'; Goals: 1 Chelsea Baker (1/2) 13'

North Sydney Oval
Attendance: 6,824
Nellie Doherty Medal: Isabelle Kelly
Referee: Jon Stone, Peter Gough

== Teams ==
New South Wales	Position	Queensland
Sam Bremner	Fullback	Chelsea Baker
Taleena Simon	Wing	Karina Brown (c)
Corban McGregor	Centre	Amelia Kuk
Isabelle Kelly	Centre	Meg Ward
Nakia Davis-Welsh	Wing	Rhiannon Revell-Blair
Lavina O'Mealey	Five-Eighth	Zahara Temara
Maddie Studdon (c)	Halfback	Ali Brigginshaw
Simaima Taufa	Prop	Rona Peters
Rebecca Riley	Hooker	Brittany Breayley
Elianna Walton	Prop	Heather Ballinger
Talesha Quinn	2nd Row	Tazmin Gray
Kezie Apps	2nd Row	Maitua Feterika
Vanessa Foliaki	Lock	Annette Brander
Nita Maynard	Interchange	Mariah Storch
Rebecca Young	Interchange	Steph Hancock
Holli Wheeler	Interchange	Kody House
Hannah Southwell	Interchange	Tallisha Harden
Ben Cross	Coach	Jason Hetherington
