= 2021 Women's State of Origin =

Queensland	New South Wales
8	6
1	2	Total
6	2	8
4	2	6
- Date: 25 June 2021
- Stadium: Sunshine Coast Stadium
- Location: Sunshine Coast, Queensland, Australia
- Nellie Doherty Medal: Tazmin Gray
- Referee: Belinda Sharpe
- Attendance: 7,183

Broadcast partners
- Broadcasters: Nine Network (Live) Fox League (Live) Kayo Sports (Live)

The 2021 Women's State of Origin was the fourth official Women's State of Origin rugby league match between the New South Wales and Queensland. It was played at Sunshine Coast Stadium on 25 June 2021. The teams have played each other annually since 1999 with the 2021 game being the fourth played under the State of Origin banner.

== Background ==
On 5 May 2021, it was announced that Sunshine Coast Stadium would host Women's State of Origin for the second consecutive year. The curtain-raiser for the senior Women's Origin game was the under-19 Origin between Queensland and New South Wales.

The match is historically notable for being the first Women's State of Origin fixture where the players, coaches and on-field officials were all women.

== Match summary ==
25 June 2021
7:45 pm (AEST)

Queensland	8 – 6	New South Wales
Tries: 1 Destiny Brill 24'; Goals: 2 Lauren Brown (2/2) 25', pen 70'	1st: 6–4; 2nd: 2–2; Highlights; Match stats (NRL); Report	Tries: 1 Isabelle Kelly 5'; Goals: 1 Maddie Studdon (1/2) pen 53'

Sunshine Coast Stadium
Attendance: 7,183
Nellie Doherty Medal: Tazmin Gray
Referee: Belinda Sharpe

== Teams ==
Queensland	Position	New South Wales
Tamika Upton	Fullback	Botille Vette-Welsh
Shenae Ciesiolka	Wing	Yasmin Meakes
Lauren Brown	Centre	Jessica Sergis
Julia Robinson	Centre	Isabelle Kelly
Karina Brown	Wing	Tiana Penitani
Tarryn Aiken	Five-Eighth	Corban Baxter
Zahara Temara	Halfback	Maddie Studdon
Chelsea Lenarduzzi	Prop	Simaima Taufa
Destiny Brill	Hooker	Keeley Davis
Shannon Mato	Prop	Millie Boyle
Tazmin Gray	2nd Row	Kezie Apps (c)
Tiana Raftstrand-Smith	2nd Row	Sarah Togatuki
Ali Brigginshaw (c)	Lock	Hannah Southwell
Tallisha Harden	Interchange	Quincy Dodd
Rona Peters	Interchange	Filomina Hanisi
Shaniah Power	Interchange	Kennedy Cherrington
Brianna Clark	Interchange	Holli Wheeler
Tahnee Norris	Coach	Kylie Hilder

== Under-19s ==
The Under-19 Women's State of Origin was played as a curtain-raiser to the senior Women's State of Origin match.

=== Match summary ===
25 June
5:15 pm (AEDT)

Queensland	12 – 16	New South Wales
Tries: 2 Sara Sautia 29'; Hannah Larsson 33'; Goals: 2 Zoe Cook 30', 35'	1st: 6–10; 2nd: 6–6; Match stats (NRL); Report	Tries: 3 Luisa Yaranamua 12'; Teagan Berry 23', 45'; Goals: 2 Rueben Cherrington 25'; Luisa Yaranamua 47'

Sunshine Coast Stadium
Player of the Match: Luisa Yaranamua

=== Teams ===
Queensland	Position	New South Wales
Jasmine Peters	Fullback	Jaime Chapman (c)
Tyesha Mikaio	Wing	Charlize Lloyd-Phillips
Emmanita Paki	Centre	Andie Robinson
Makenzie Weale	Centre	Cassey Tohi-Hiku
Traevonnah Fisher	Wing	Teagan Berry
Jada Ferguson	Five-Eighth	Luisa Yaranamua
Courtney Tamati	Halfback	Tayla Montgomery
Keilee Joseph (c)	Prop	Fatafehi Hanisi
Jetaya Faifua	Hooker	Rueben Cherrington
April Ngatupuna	Prop	Rose Lina Tau
Zoe Cook	2nd Row	Hope Tevaga
Sara Sautia	2nd Row	Chantel Tugaga
Nakita Sao	Lock	Lilly Baker
Jazmon Tupou-Witchman	Interchange	Taneka Todhunter
Ebony Laing	Interchange	Tegan Dymock
Jordii Mahendrarajah	Interchange	Folau Vaki
Hannah Larsson	Interchange	Leilani Wilson
Kelvin Wright	Coach	Blake Cavallaro
