= Queensland women's rugby league team =

Queensland Maroons

Team information
- Nickname: Maroons
- Governing body: Queensland Rugby League
- Head coach: Nathan Cross
- Captain: Tamika Upton
- Most caps: Karyn Murphy (20)
- Home stadium: Sunshine Coast Stadium (12,000)

Team results
- First game
- Queensland 18–16 New South Wales (ANZ Stadium, Brisbane; 4 July 1999)
- Biggest win
- Queensland 46–4 New South Wales (Kougari Oval, Brisbane; 9 August 2008)
- Biggest defeat
- Queensland 10–50 Great Britain (Brothers Leagues Club, Ipswich; 17 July 2002)

The Queensland women's rugby league team represents the Australian state of Queensland in rugby league football. Nicknamed the "Maroons", after the colour of their jersey, the team compete in the annual Women's State of Origin game against arch-rivals New South Wales. Coached by Nathan Cross and captained by Tamika Upton, the team is administered by the Queensland Rugby League.

Until 2017, the team competed in the Women's Interstate Challenge before the game was rebranded as State of Origin in 2018. From 1999 to 2015, the Maroons went on an unprecedented 17-year undefeated streak.

== History ==
In 1999, Queensland played New South Wales for the first time at Brisbane's ANZ Stadium, with the Maroons' winning 18–16. The win started an undefeated streak that would last for 17 years. The team were originally nicknamed the "Brolgas".

In 2015, Queensland failed to defeat New South Wales for the first time, drawing with them 4–all at Townsville's 1300SMILES Stadium.

In 2016, New South Wales defeated Queensland for the first time, winning 8–4 at Cbus Super Stadium.

In 2018, the Women's Interstate Challenge was rebranded as State of Origin. On 22 June 2018, New South Wales won the first game under the State of Origin banner, defeating Queensland 16–10 at North Sydney Oval. In 2020, Queensland won their first game under the Origin banner, defeating New South Wales 24–18.

On 23 March 2021, Tahnee Norris, who played 13 interstate games for Queensland, was announced as new head coach of the side.

In March 2022, it was announced that the one fixture in 2022 would be played at Canberra Stadium on 24 June, and that from 2023 onwards, two Women's State of Origin matches would be played each season.

== Players ==
Prior to 2019, the Queensland and New South Wales teams were largely selected under residency rules, meaning a number of players represented both states. Tahnee Norris, who captained Queensland, and Natalie Dwyer, both represented New South Wales before moving to Queensland, while Tarah Westera represented Queensland before moving south.

In 2019, the eligibility rules were revised to be more inline with the men's State of Origin rules. The residency rule was removed, which saw New Zealand representatives Maitua Feterika (Queensland) and Nita Maynard (New South Wales) ruled ineligible. Rona Peters was also ruled ineligible as she had previously represented New Zealand. This was later overturned and she was given special dispensation, as she had retired from international rugby league in 2015, before she first represented Queensland in 2016.

=== Current squad ===
On 22 April 2026, the QRL announced the squad for the first match of the three-match series, subsequently played on 30 April 2026. On 6 May 2026, the squad for the second match on 14 May 2026, was announced with one change.
The squad announced for game three was adjusted for a further three injuries.

Table last updated 29 May 2026.

J#	Player	Age	Position(s)	Queensland					NRLW			Tests	All Stars
J#	Player	Age	Position(s)	Dbt	M	T	G	Pts	2026 Club	CM	TM	Tests	All Stars
1	Destiny Mino-Sinapati	21	Fullback	2026	1	0	0	0	Titans	13	13	1	—
2	Shenae Ciesiolka	28	Wing	2020	13	1	0	4	Dragons	0	40	3	—
3	Rory Owen	22	Centre	2025	5	2	0	8	Eels	14	14	—	—
4	Ivana Lolesio	22	Centre	2026	3	0	0	0	Titans	12	12	—	—
5	Jasmine Peters	23	Centre	2025	5	1	0	4	Cowboys	30	38	—	6
6	Chantay Kiria-Ratu	20	Five-eighth	2026	3	0	0	0	Sharks	13	24	2	—
7	Lauren Brown	31	Halfback	2020	12	0	19	39	Titans	35	45	7	—
8	Otesa Pule	23	Prop, Second-row	2026	3	1	0	4	Roosters	40	40	10	—
9	Destiny Brill	22	Hooker, Lock	2021	11	2	0	8	Broncos	29	41	3	2
10	Jessika Elliston	28	Prop	2019	13	0	0	0	Titans	43	48	2	—
11	Sienna Lofipo	21	Second-row	2024	7	1	0	4	Titans	24	24	4	—
12	Romy Teitzel	27	Second-row	2023	11	1	1	6	Broncos	33	45	—	—
13	Keilee Joseph	24	Lock	2023	9	0	0	0	Eels	0	45	6	6
14	Emma Manzelmann	24	Hooker	2023	8	0	0	0	Cowboys	30	42	1	—
15	Brianna Clark	31	Prop	2021	2	0	0	0	Broncos	31	37	8	—
16	Lillian Yarrow	22	Prop	2026	1	0	0	0	Broncos	0	15	—	—
17	Jada Ferguson	23	Hooker	2025	5	1	0	4	Broncos	39	39	—	—
18	Chelsea Lenarduzzi	30	Lock, Prop, Second-row	2017	9	1	0	4	Broncos	55	55	1	—
19	Sophie Holyman	28	Prop, Lock	2023	7	0	0	0	Raiders	29	34	—	—
20	Georgia Ravics	—	Wing	—	0	0	0	0	Sharks	28	28	—	—
IJ	Phoenix-Raine Hippi	19	Wing	2026	1	0	0	0	Titans	7	7	—	1
IJ	Julia Robinson	28	Wing	2020	12	3	0	12	Broncos	46	46	10	—
IJ	Tamika Upton	29	Fullback	2020	12	5	0	20	Broncos	24	50	6	2
IJ	Makenzie Weale	23	Prop	2024	9	1	0	4	Cowboys	20	24	—	—

Notes

- Lauren Brown kicked a field goal within the last three minutes of the second match of the 2024 series. Brown had kicked match-winning field goals in Rounds 2 and 6 of the 2023 NRLW season.
- Incumbent captain Ali Brigginshaw, who made 20 appearances for Queensland, announced her retirement from representative rugby league in January 2026.
- Incumbent five-eighth Tarryn Aiken was unavailable due to injury.
- The squad announced for game two saw:
  - Jasmine Peters brought in to replaced the injured Phoenix-Raine Hippi on the wing.
  - Otesa Pule named to start at prop with Makenzie Weale reverting to the bench.
  - Destiny Brill and Brianna Clark elevated from 18th and 19th players to the interchange bench.
  - Chelsea Lenarduzzi and Emma Manzelmann were dropped to the reserves.
  - Destiny Brill started at dummy-half ahead of Jada Ferguson. Ferguson scored her try from dummy-half.
  - Emma Manzelmann was elevated to the interchange bench ahead of Shenae Ciesiolka. Manzelmann also spent game time at dummy-half.
- The squad announced for game three saw:
  - Destiny Mino-Sinapati and Shenae Ciesiolka elevated from the extended bench to replace, respectively, the injured Tamika Upton at fullback and Julia Robinson on the wing.
  - Lillian Yarrow brought into the squad and onto the interchange bench to replace the injured Makenzie Weale.
  - Sophie Holyman and Georgia Ravics brought into the squad and onto the extended bench.
  - A shuffle of jersey numbers for the three dummy-halves: Destiny Brill to 9, Emma Manzelmann to 14, and Jada Ferguson to 17.
- Under the change to State of Origin eligibility rules announced by the NRL in February 2026, New Zealand Kiwi Ferns representatives Brianna Clark and Otesa Pule became eligible for Queensland. Clark had previously played for Queensland in 2021 prior to declaring her national allegiance to New Zealand.
- Shenae Ciesiolka, Keilee Joseph, and Lillian Yarrow changed clubs between the conclusion of the 2025 NRLW season and the 2026 State of Origin series.

Key to icons used in the above table

- Tests: Australia, Cook Islands, New Zealand and Samoa
- All Stars: Indigenous All Stars and Māori All Stars.

== Coaches ==
Accurate records were not kept in early years of the Women's Interstate Challenge by either the QRL or the NSWRL. The following list of coaches is therefore incomplete.

Coach	Years	Games	Wins	Win %	Ref
Tony Ashton	1999	1	1	100%	
Karen Stuart	2001, 2007-2008	3	3	100%	
Darrell Rogers	2005	1	1	100%	
Gordon Robson	2008	2	2	100%	
Steve Belsham	2009–2011	3	3	100%	
Beth Harlow	2012	1	1	100%	
Brad Donald	2013–2016	4	2	50%	
Adrian Vowles	2017	1	0	0%	
Jason Hetherington	2018–2020	3	1	33%	
Tahnee Norris	2021–2025	10	5	50%	
Nathan Cross	2026	3	0	0%	

Table last updated: 29 May 2026

== Results ==
Note: Queensland score is given first.

Date	Opponent	Score	Competition	Venue	Attendance	Video	Ref.
12 July 1995	New Zealand	0–48	1995 NZ Women's tour	Davies Park, Brisbane		—	
15 July 1995	New Zealand	0–36	1995 NZ Women's tour	Seagulls Stadium, Tweed Heads		—	
24 July 1996	Great Britain	8–22	1996 GB Women's tour (Note: The games against Great Britain in 1996 and 2002 were played between Test Matches and did not include Queensland representatives who were in the Australian squad.)	Gilbert Park, Brisbane		—	(Note: Queensland XIII team)
4 July 1999	New South Wales	18–16	1999 Interstate Challenge	ANZ Stadium, Brisbane			
9 July 2000	New South Wales	–	2000 Interstate Challenge	ANZ Stadium, Brisbane		—	
22 July 2001	New South Wales	34–14	2001 Interstate Challenge	ANZ Stadium, Brisbane		—	
23 June 2002	New South Wales	26–16	2002 Interstate Challenge	Ipswich		—	
17 July 2002	Great Britain	10–50	2002 GB Women's tour	Ipswich Brothers Leagues Club	≈ 1,050	—	
2003	New South Wales	–	2003 Interstate Challenge			—	
24 July 2004	New South Wales	40–8	2004 Interstate Challenge (QLD win series 2–0)	Suncorp Stadium, Brisbane		—	
31 July 2004	New South Wales	46–8	2004 Interstate Challenge (QLD win series 2–0)	Newcastle		—	
6 August 2005	New South Wales	20–18	2005 Interstate Challenge	Henson Park, Marrickville		—	
30 July 2006	New South Wales	40–24	2006 Interstate Challenge	Suncorp Stadium, Brisbane		—	
13 August 2007	New South Wales	38–16	2007 Interstate Challenge	CUA Stadium, Penrith		—	
8 July 2008	New South Wales	8–6	2008 Interstate Challenge (QLD win series 2–0)	CUA Stadium, Penrith		—	
9 August 2008	New South Wales	46–4	2008 Interstate Challenge (QLD win series 2–0)	Kougari Oval, Brisbane	800	—	
18 July 2009	New South Wales	20–14	2009 Interstate Challenge	CUA Stadium, Penrith		—	
26 June 2010	New South Wales	36–6	2010 Interstate Challenge	Albert Park, Gympie		—	
25 May 2011	New South Wales	26–0	2011 Interstate Challenge	Suncorp Stadium, Brisbane		—	
23 June 2012	New South Wales	34–10	2012 Interstate Challenge	Centrebet Stadium, Penrith		—	
7 April 2013	New South Wales	30–12	2013 Interstate Challenge	Davies Park, Brisbane		—	
19 July 2014	New South Wales	26–10	2014 Interstate Challenge	Leichhardt Oval, Sydney		—	
27 June 2015	New South Wales	4–4	2015 Interstate Challenge	1300SMILES Stadium, Townsville		—	
23 July 2016	New South Wales	4–8	2016 Interstate Challenge	Cbus Super Stadium, Gold Coast		—	
23 July 2017	New South Wales	6–22	2017 Interstate Challenge	WIN Stadium, Wollongong		—	
22 June 2018	New South Wales	10–16	2018 State of Origin	North Sydney Oval, Sydney	6,824		
21 June 2019	New South Wales	4–14	2019 State of Origin	North Sydney Oval, Sydney	10,515		
13 November 2020	New South Wales	24–18	2020 State of Origin	Sunshine Coast Stadium, Sunshine Coast	4,833		
25 June 2021	New South Wales	8–6	2021 State of Origin	Sunshine Coast Stadium, Sunshine Coast	7,183		
24 June 2022	New South Wales	14–20	2022 State of Origin	GIO Stadium, Canberra	11,321		
21 June 2023	New South Wales	18–10	2023 State of Origin (1–1, QLD win on aggregate score)	Commbank Stadium, Sydney	12,972		
22 June 2023	New South Wales	14–18	2023 State of Origin (1–1, QLD win on aggregate score)	Queensland Country Bank Stadium, Townsville	18,275		
16 May 2024	New South Wales	12–22	2024 State of Origin (QLD win series 2–1)	Suncorp Stadium, Brisbane	25,492		
6 June 2024	New South Wales	11–10	2024 State of Origin (QLD win series 2–1)	McDonald Jones Stadium, Newcastle	25,782		
27 June 2024	New South Wales	22–6	2024 State of Origin (QLD win series 2–1)	Queensland Country Bank Stadium, Townsville	22,819		
1 May 2025	New South Wales	12–32	2025 State of Origin (NSW win series 2–1)	Suncorp Stadium, Brisbane	26,022		
15 May 2025	New South Wales	6–26	2025 State of Origin (NSW win series 2–1)	Allianz Stadium, Sydney	16,026		
29 May 2025	New South Wales	18–14	2025 State of Origin (NSW win series 2–1)	McDonald Jones Stadium, Newcastle	21,912		
30 April 2026	New South Wales	6–11	2026 State of Origin (NSW win series 3-0)	McDonald Jones Stadium, Newcastle	20,179		
14 May 2026	New South Wales	10–14	2026 State of Origin (NSW win series 3-0)	Suncorp Stadium, Brisbane	23,846		
28 May 2026	New South Wales	4–12	2026 State of Origin (NSW win series 3-0)	Cbus Super Stadium, Gold Coast	11,816		

== Margins and streaks ==
Biggest winning margins

Margin	Score	Opponent	Venue	Date
16	22—6	New South Wales	Queensland Country Bank Stadium	27 June 2024
8	26—6	New South Wales	CommBank Stadium	1 June 2023
6	24—18	New South Wales	Sunshine Coast Stadium	13 Nov 2020
4	18—14	New South Wales	McDonald Jones Stadium	29 May 2025

Biggest losing margins

Margin	Score	Opponent	Venue	Date
20	12–32	New South Wales	Suncorp Stadium	1 May 2025
20	6–26	New South Wales	Allianz Stadium	15 May 2025
10	12–22	New South Wales	Suncorp Stadium	16 May 2024
10	4–14	New South Wales	North Sydney Oval	21 June 2019

== Match details ==
=== 2006 ===
Played as a curtain raiser to the Round 21 NRL game between the Brisbane Broncos and Wests Tigers.

Sunday, 30 July 2006
12.15 AEST

Queensland	40 – 24	New South Wales
Tries: 7 Steph Hancock (2); Leah Williams (2); Teresa Anderson; Karyn Murphy; Megan Spicer; Goals: 6 Neena Fraser (4); Steph Hancock; Megan Spicer	1st: 16–10; 2nd: 24–14	Tries: 4 Teina Clark; Dahlia Tahu; Nadine Schmidt; Johnnie Tukwaho; Goals: 4 Teina Clark (4)

Suncorp Stadium, Brisbane
Player of the Match: Steph Hancock

Team list:

Queensland Maroons
2006 team		Coaching staff
1 Teresa Anderson – FB; 2 Megan Spicer – WG; 3 Jaye Christensen – CE; 4 Carolyn White – CE; 5 Tammy Cole – WG; 6 Erin Elliott – FE; 7 Karyn Murphy (c) – HB; 8 Leah Williams – PR; 9 Rebecca Jones – HK; 10 Neena Fraser – PR; 11 Melissa Edwards – SR; 12 Tahnee Norris – SR; 13 Steph Hancock – LK	14 Jenny Pope – SR; 15 Anna-Marie Burki – SR; 16 Jasmine Green – SR; 17 Kerryanne Stead – SR	Legend: (c) Captain(s); (vc) Vice-captain(s)

=== 2007 ===
Played as a curtain raiser to the Round 22 NRL game between the Penrith Panthers and North Queensland Cowboys.

Monday, 13 August 2007
15.30 AEST

New South Wales	16 – 38	Queensland
Tries: ? Goals: ?	1st: 10–12; 2nd: 6–26	Tries: 7 Rachele Whelan (2); Bianca Ambrum; Teresa Anderson; Kellie Batchelor; Suzanne Johnson; Leah Williams; Goals: 5 Kellie Batchelor (5)

CUA Stadium, Penrith

Team list:

Queensland Maroons
2007 team		Coaching staff
1 Jasmine Green – FB; 2 Megan Spicer – WG; 3 Casey Watkins – CE; 4 Suzanne Johnson – CE; 5 Rachele Whelan – WG; 6 Erin Elliott – FE; 7 Teresa Anderson – HB; 8 Leah Williams – PR; 9 Tooa Nanai – HK; 10 Bianca Ambrum – PR; 11 Kellie Batchelor – SR; 12 Hayley Vankempen – SR; 13 Tahnee Norris (c) – LK	14 Alisha Creeed – SR; 15 Melissa Edwards – SR; 16 Tania Davis – SR; 17 Alex Robertson – SR	Head coach: Karen Stuart; Legend: (c) Captain(s); (vc) Vice-captain(s)

=== 2008 ===
The Woman's Interstate Challenge was played as a two-game series in 2008.

==== Game 1 ====
Tuesday, 8 July 2008
16.00 AEST

New South Wales	6 – 8	Queensland
Tries: 1 Jessica Palmer; Goals: 1 Teina Clark		Tries: 2 Steph Hancock; Tegan Rolfe

CUA Stadium, Penrith
Player of the Match: Renae Kunst

Team list:

Queensland Maroons
2008 team		Coaching staff
1 Erin Elliott – FB; 2 Teresa Aiton – WG; 3 Tegan Rolfe – CE; 4 Steph Hancock – CE; 5 Suzanne Johnson – WG; 6 Karyn Murphy (c) – FE; 7 Teresa Anderson – HB; 8 Neena Fraser – PR; 9 Tarah Westera – HK; 10 Tracey Bailey – PR; 11 Amie Solomona – SR; 12 Renae Kunst – SR; 13 Deanna Turner – LK	14 Bianca Ambrum – PR; 15 Leah Williams – PR; 16 Anna-Marie Burki – SR; 17 Naomi Bobongie – HK	Head coach: Gordon Robson; Legend: (c) Captain(s); (vc) Vice-captain(s)

==== Game 2 ====
Saturday, 9 August 2008
17.00 AEST

Queensland	46 – 4	New South Wales
Tries: 10; Bianca Ambrum (3); Suzanne Johnson (2); Tarah Westera (2); Tegan Rolfe; Renae Kunst; Steph Hancock; Goals: 3 Steph Hancock (3)	1st: 26–0; 2nd: 20–4	Tries: 1 Lisa Fiaola

Kougari Oval, Brisbane
Attendance: 800

Game 2 team was different to game 1 team.

=== 2009 ===
Played as a curtain raiser to the Round 19 NRL game between the Penrith Panthers and Canberra Raiders.

Saturday, 18 July 2009
13.40 AEST

New South Wales	14 – 20	Queensland
Tries: 3 Poihaera Clark; Natalie Levi; Jessica Palmer; Goals: 1 Renee Gloss		Tries: 4 Erin Elliott; Tahnee Norris; Nive Moefaauo; Tarah Westera; Goals: 2 Natalie Dwyer; Tegan Rolfe

CUA Stadium, Penrith
Player of the Match: Tahnee Norris

=== 2010 ===
Saturday, 26 June 2010

Queensland	36–6	New South Wales
Tries: 7 Latisha Gary (2); Tegan Rolfe (2); Karina Brown; Natalie Dwyer; Suzanne Johnson; Goals: 4 Natalie Dwyer (4)	1st: 20–0; 2nd: 16–6	Tries: 1 Kylie Hilder; Goals: 1 Teina Clark

Albert Park, Gympie
Referee: Jon Kennedy
Player of the Match: Latisha Gary

Team list:

Queensland Maroons
2010 team		Coaching staff
1 Latisha Gary – FB; 2 Tarah Westera – WG; 3 Ali Brigginshaw – CE; 4 Tegan Rolfe – CE; 5 Karina Brown – WG; 6 Erin Elliott – FE; 7 Karyn Murphy (c) – HB; 8 Jo Barrett – PR; 9 Natalie Dwyer – HK; 10 Steph Hancock – PR; 11 Suzanne Johnson – SR; 12 Renae Kunst – SR; 13 Tahnee Norris – LK	14 Delwyn Fraser – SR; 15 Heather Ballinger – PR; 16 Sarah Robbins – SR; 17 Yvette Martin – SR	Head coach: Steve Belsham; Legend: (c) Captain(s); (vc) Vice-captain(s)

=== 2011 ===
Played as a curtain raiser to Game I of the 2011 State of Origin series.

Wednesday, 25 May 2011

Queensland	26 – 0	New South Wales
Tries: 6 Bianca Ambrum; Natasha Baggow; Natalie Dwyer; Natalie Gala; Steph Hancock; Karyn Murphy; Goals: 1 Natalie Dwyer	1st: 14–0; 2nd: 12–0

Suncorp Stadium, Brisbane

Team list:

Queensland Maroons
2011 team		Coaching staff
1 Tegan Rolfe – FB; 2 Bianca Ambrum – WG; 3 Steph Hancock – CE; 4 Nicole Curtis – CE; 5 Tui Cope – WG; 6 Erin Elliott – FE; 7 Karyn Murphy (c) – HB; 8 Heather Ballinger – PR; 9 Natalie Dwyer – HK; 10 Jo Barrett – PR; 11 Renae Kunst – SR; 12 Suzanne Johnson – SR; 13 Tahnee Norris – LK	14 Natasha Baggow – SR; 15 Delwyn Fraser – PR; 16 Natalie Gala – SR; 17 Kaitlin Moss – SR	Head coach: Steve Belsham; Legend: (c) Captain(s); (vc) Vice-captain(s)

=== 2012 ===
Played as a curtain raiser to the Round 16 NRL game between the Penrith Panthers and Parramatta Eels.

Saturday, 23 June 2012
15.00 AEST

New South Wales	10–34	Queensland
Tries: 2 Sam Hammond; Tarah Westera; Goals: 1 Maddie Studdon	1st: 10–16; 2nd: 0–18	Tries: 8 Bianca Ambrum (4); Natalie Dwyer (2); Karina Brown; Karyn Murphy; Goals: 1 Amber Saltner

Centrebet Stadium, Penrith
Player of the Match: Heather Ballinger

Team list:

Queensland Maroons
2012 team		Coaching staff
1 Teresa Anderson – FB; 2 Karina Brown – WG; 3 Bianca Ambrum – CE; 4 Tegan Rolfe – CE; 5 Amber Saltner – WG; 6 Ali Brigginshaw – FE; 7 Karyn Murphy (c) – HB; 8 Heather Ballinger – PR; 9 Natalie Dwyer – HK; 10 Steph Hancock – PR; 11 Renae Kunst – SR; 12 Deanna Turner – SR; 13 Tahnee Norris – LK	14 Jo Barrett – PR; 15 Erin Elliott – FE; 16 Kate Haren – SR; 17 Natalie Gala – SR	Head coach: Beth Harlow; Legend: (c) Captain(s); (vc) Vice-captain(s)

=== 2013 ===
Sunday, 7 April 2013

Queensland	30 – 12	New South Wales
Tries: 6 Bianca Ambrum; Jo Barrett; Steph Hancock; Renae Kunst; Tahnee Norris; Amber Saltner; Goals: 3 Amber Saltner (3)	1st: 10–6; 2nd: 20–6	Tries: 2 Tegan Chandler (2); Goals: 2 Margaret Watson (2)

Davies Park, Brisbane
Player of the Match: Steph Hancock

Team list:

Queensland Maroons
2013 team		Coaching staff
1 Teresa Anderson – FB; 2 Bianca Ambrum – WG; 3 Jo Barrett – CE; 4 Tegan Rolfe – CE; 5 Amber Saltner – WG; 6 Ali Brigginshaw – FE; 7 Karyn Murphy (c) – HB; 8 Heather Ballinger – PR; 9 Natalie Dwyer – HK; 10 Steph Hancock – PR; 11 Renae Kunst – SR; 12 Deanna Turner – SR; 13 Tahnee Norris – LK	14 Jenni-Sue Hoepper – FE; 15 Nichole Richards – SR; 16 Millie Edwards – PR; 17 Kaitlin Moss – SR	Head coach: Brad Donald; Legend: (c) Captain(s); (vc) Vice-captain(s)

=== 2014 ===
Saturday, 19 July 2014

New South Wales	10 – 26	Queensland
Tries: 2 Kezie Apps; Teina Clark; Goals: 1 Maddie Studdon	1st: 0–16; 2nd: 10–10	Tries: 5 Steph Hancock; Kellye Hodges; Jenni-Sue Hoepper; Renae Kunst; Deanna Turner; Goals: 3 Ali Brigginshaw (2); Jenni-Sue Hoepper

Leichhardt Oval, Sydney
Player of the Match: Renae Kunst

Team list:

Queensland Maroons
2014 team		Coaching staff
1 Latisha Gary – FB; 2 Kellye Hodges – WG; 3 Annette Brander – CE; 4 Jenni-Sue Hoepper – CE; 5 Kady Tinker – WG; 6 Ali Brigginshaw – FE; 7 Karyn Murphy (c) – HB; 8 Steph Hancock – PR; 9 Brittany Breayley – HK; 10 Heather Ballinger – PR; 11 Renae Kunst – SR; 12 Deanna Turner – SR; 13 Tarah Westera – LK	14 Talia Poutini-Lawrence – PR; 15 Nichole Richards – SR; 16 Teri Nukunuku – PR; 17 Jazmyn Taumafai – SR	Head coach: Brad Donald; Legend: (c) Captain(s); (vc) Vice-captain(s)

=== 2015 ===
Played as a curtain raiser to the Round 16 NRL game between the North Queensland Cowboys and Cronulla-Sutherland Sharks.

Saturday, 27 June 2015

Queensland	4 – 4	New South Wales
Tries: 1 Chelsea Baker	1st: 4–0; 2nd: 0–4	Tries: 1 Isabelle Kelly

1300SMILES Stadium, Townsville
Player of the Match: Simaima Taufa

Team list:

Queensland Maroons
2015 team		Coaching staff
1 Karina Brown – FB; 2 Chelsea Baker – WG; 3 Kody House – CE; 4 Annette Brander – CE; 5 Latoya Billy – WG; 6 Jenni-Sue Hoepper – FE; 7 Courtney Lockwood – HB; 8 Steph Hancock (c) – PR; 9 Brittany Breayley – HK; 10 Heather Ballinger – PR; 11 Renae Kunst – SR; 12 Carly Bell – SR; 13 Tarah Westera – LK	14 Jazmyn Taumafai – PR; 15 Florence Faamita – SR; 16 Sarah Walker – PR; 17 Amie Solomona – SR	Head coach: Brad Donald; Legend: (c) Captain(s); (vc) Vice-captain(s)

=== 2016 ===
Played as a curtain raiser to the Round 20 NRL game between the Gold Coast Titans and Parramatta Eels.

Saturday, 23 July 2016
15.10 AEST

Queensland	4 – 8	New South Wales
Tries: 1 Ali Brigginshaw 79'	1st: 0–0; 2nd: 4–8	Tries: 1 Simaima Taufa 52'; Goals: 2 Maddie Studdon 54', pen 76'

Cbus Super Stadium, Gold Coast
Referee: Jakson Shearer
Player of the Match: Kezie Apps

Team list:

Queensland Maroons
2016 team		Coaching staff
1 Karina Brown – FB; 2 Chelsea Baker – WG; 3 Annette Brander – CE; 4 Amelia Kuk – CE; 5 Kody House – WG; 6 Ali Brigginshaw – FE; 7 Courtney Lockwood – HB; 16 Selena Tranter – PR; 9 Brittany Breayley – HK; 10 Heather Ballinger – PR; 11 Renae Kunst – SR; 12 Tazmin Gray – SR; 13 Rona Peters – LK	8 Steph Hancock (c) – PR; 14 Libby Cook-Black – SR; 15 Stefanie Gallagher – PR; 17 Tegan Rolfe – FB	Head coach: Brad Donald; Legend: (c) Captain(s); (vc) Vice-captain(s)

=== 2017 ===
Played as a curtain raiser to the Round 20 NRL game between the St George Illawarra Dragons and Manly Warringah Sea Eagles.

Sunday, 23 July 2017

New South Wales	22 – 6	Queensland
Tries: 5 Jessica Sergis 6', 11', 61'; Corban McGregor 51'; Vanessa Foliaki 55'; Goals: 1 Caitlin Moran 12'	1st: 10–6; 2nd: 12–0	Tries: 1 Jenni-Sue Hoepper 21'; Goals: 1 Chelsea Baker 23'

WIN Stadium, Wollongong
Referee: Chris Treneman
Player of the Match: Kezie Apps

Team list:

Queensland Maroons
2017 team		Coaching staff
1 Karina Brown (c) – FB; 2 Chelsea Baker – WG; 3 Amelia Kuk – CE; 4 Jenni-Sue Hoepper – CE; 5 Courtney Robinson – WG; 6 Zahara Temara – FE; 7 Ali Brigginshaw – HB; 8 Steph Hancock – PR; 9 Brittany Breayley – HK; 10 Heather Ballinger – PR; 11 Renae Kunst – SR; 12 Tazmin Gray – SR; 13 Rona Peters – LK	14 Sasha Mahuika – HK; 15 Kody House – SR; 16 Asipau Mafi – PR; 17 Chelsea Lenarduzzi – PR	Head coach: Adrian Vowles; Legend: (c) Captain(s); (vc) Vice-captain(s)

=== 2018 ===
The first "official" State of Origin game.

Friday, 22 June
7:40 pm (AEDT)

New South Wales	16 – 10	Queensland
Tries: 3 Isabelle Kelly 7', 54'; Nakia Davis-Welsh 36'; Goals: 2 Maddie Studdon (2/3) 9', 55'	1st: 6–6; 2nd: 10–4; Highlights; Match Stats (NRL); Report	Tries: 2 Karina Brown 12', 45'; Goals: 1 Chelsea Baker (1/2) 13'

North Sydney Oval
Attendance: 6,824
Nellie Doherty Medal: Isabelle Kelly
Referee: Jon Stone, Peter Gough

Team list:

Queensland Maroons
2018 team		Coaching staff
1 Chelsea Baker – FB; 2 Karina Brown (c) – WG; 3 Amelia Kuk – CE; 4 Meg Ward – CE; 5 Rhiannon Revell-Blair – WG; 6 Zahara Temara – FE; 7 Ali Brigginshaw – HB; 8 Rona Peters – PR; 9 Brittany Breayley – HK; 10 Heather Ballinger – PR; 11 Tazmin Gray – SR; 12 Maitua Feterika – SR; 13 Annette Brander – LK	14 Mariah Storch – SR; 15 Steph Hancock – PR; 16 Kody House – SR; 17 Tallisha Harden – SR	Head coach: Jason Hetherington; Legend: (c) Captain(s); (vc) Vice-captain(s)

=== 2019 ===
Friday, 21 June
7:40 pm (AEDT)

New South Wales	14 – 4	Queensland
Tries: 3 Jessica Sergis 38'; Shakiah Tungai 44'; Maddie Studdon 50'; Goals: 1 Kirra Dibb (1/2) 51'	1st: 0–4; 2nd: 14–0; Highlights; Match Stats (NRL); Report	Tries: 1 Tazmin Gray 24'

North Sydney Oval
Attendance: 10,515
Nellie Doherty Medal: Maddie Studdon
Referee: Grant Atkins, Belinda Sharpe

Team list:

Queensland Maroons
2019 team		Coaching staff
1 Chelsea Baker – FB; 2 Karina Brown – WG; 3 Stephanie Mooka – CE; 4 Amber Pilley – CE; 5 Meg Ward – WG; 6 Ali Brigginshaw (c) – FE; 7 Jenni-Sue Hoepper – HB; 8 Heather Ballinger – PR; 9 Brittany Breayley – HK; 13 Rona Peters – PR; 11 Tazmin Gray – SR; 15 Tallisha Harden – SR; 12 Annette Brander – LK	10 Steph Hancock – SR; 14 Amy Turner – PR; 16 Chelsea Lenarduzzi – SR; 17 Jessika Elliston – SR	Head coach: Jason Hetherington; Legend: (c) Captain(s); (vc) Vice-captain(s)

=== 2020 ===
Friday, 13 November
7:45 pm (AEDT)

Queensland	24 – 18	New South Wales
Tries: 4 Tamika Upton 14', 43'; Tarryn Aiken 51'; Steph Hancock 57'; Goals: 4 Lauren Brown (4/4) 15', 44', 52', 58'	1st: 6–6; 2nd: 18–12; Highlights; Match Stats (NRL); Report	Tries: 4 Kezie Apps 24'; Tiana Penitani 59'; Filomina Hanisi 67'; Botille Vette-Welsh 69'; Goals: 1 Melanie Howard (1/1) 26'

Sunshine Coast Stadium
Attendance: 4,833
Nellie Doherty Medal: Tarryn Aiken
Referee: Belinda Sharpe

=== 2021 ===
25 June 2021
7:45 pm (AEST)

Queensland	8 – 6	New South Wales
Tries: 1 Destiny Brill 24'; Goals: 2 Lauren Brown (2/2) 25', pen 70'	1st: 6–4; 2nd: 2–2; Highlights; Match stats (NRL); Report	Tries: 1 Isabelle Kelly 5'; Goals: 1 Maddie Studdon (1/2) pen 53'

Sunshine Coast Stadium
Attendance: 7,183
Nellie Doherty Medal: Tazmin Gray
Referee: Belinda Sharpe

=== 2022 ===
24 June 2022
7:45 pm (AEST)

New South Wales	20 – 14	Queensland
Tries: 3 Emma Tonegato 13'; Kirra Dibb 15'; Isabelle Kelly 67'; Goals: 4 Rachael Pearson (4/5) 14', 17', pen 27', pen 41'	1st: 14–10; 2nd: 6–4; Highlights; Match stats (NRL); Report	Tries: 3 Destiny Brill 8'; Tarryn Aiken 21'; Evania Pelite 56'; Goals: 1 Ali Brigginshaw (1/2) 22'

GIO Stadium
Attendance: 11,321
Nellie Doherty Medal: Isabelle Kelly
Referee: Belinda Sharpe

=== 2023 ===
Game I

Thursday, 1 June
19:45 AEST (UTC+10:00)

New South Wales	10–18	Queensland
Tries: Sergis 16'; Chapman 50'; Goals: Southwell 1/2 18'	1st: 6–10; 2nd: 4–8; Match stats (NRL); Report	Tries: Robinson 7', 45'; Gray 32'; Bass 40'; Goals: Temara 1/4 34'

Commbank Stadium, Sydney
Attendance: 12,972
Referee: Adam Gee
Bunker: Kasey Badger
Touch judges: Dave Munro, Belinda Sharpe

Game II

Thursday, 22 June

Queensland	14–18	New South Wales
Tries: Upton 17'; Bass 25'; Aiken 27'; Goals: Temara 1/3 29'	1st: 14–6; 2nd: 0–12; Match stats (NRL); Report	Tries: Penitani 3', 40'; Clydsdale 68'; Goals: Southwell 3/5 10 (pen)', 45 (pen)', 69'

Queensland Country Bank Stadium, Townsville
Attendance: 18,275
Referee: Belinda Sharpe
Bunker: Kasey Badger
Touch judges: Darian Furner, Wayne Raymond

=== 2024 ===
Game 1

16 May 2024
19:45 AEST

Queensland	12–22	New South Wales
Tries: 2 Upton 53'; Bass 67'; Goals: 2 Temara 2/2 53', 68'	1st: 0–14; 2nd: 12–8; Match stats (NRL); Report	Tries: 3 Tonegato 5'; Chapman 9'; Johnston 64'; Goals: 5 Pearson 5/5 6', 10', pen 18', pen 37', 65'

Suncorp Stadium, Brisbane
Attendance: 25,492
Referee: Kasey Badger
Player of the Match: Yasmin Clydsdale

Game 2

6 June 2024
19:45 AEST

New South Wales	10–11	Queensland
Tries: 2 Davis 24'; Penitani 58'; Goals: 1 Pearson 1/2 25'	1st: 6–0; 2nd: 4–11; Match stats (NRL); Report	Tries: 2 Ciesiolka 54'; Aiken 61'; Goals: 1 Brown 1/2 63'; Field goals: Brown 68'

McDonald Jones Stadium, Newcastle
Attendance: 25,782
Referee: Belinda Sharpe
Player of the Match: Shannon Mato

Game 3

27 June 2024
19:45 AEST

Queensland	22–6	New South Wales
Tries: 3 Pelite 1'; Robinson 29'; Gray 67'; Goals: 5 Brown 4/4 3', pen 8', 31', 68'; Teitzel 1/1 pen 38'	1st: 14–0; 2nd: 8–6; Match stats (NRL); Report	Tries: 1 Chapman 58'; Goals: 1 Pearson 1/1 59'

Queensland Country Bank Stadium, Townsville
Attendance: 22,819
Referee: Belinda Sharpe
Player of the Match: Evania Pelite

=== 2025 ===
Game 1

Thursday, 1 May 2025
19:45 AEST

Queensland	12–32	New South Wales
Tries: 2 Sienna Lofipo 7'; Rory Owen 24'; Goals: 2 Lauren Brown 2/2 8', 25'	1st: 12–14; 2nd: 0–18; Highlights; Match stats (NRL)	Tries: 6 Jessica Sergis 4'; Isabelle Kelly 14'; Jayme Fressard 19', 40'; Ellie Johnston 50'; Abbi Church 64'; Goals: 4 Jesse Southwell 4/7 5', 52', pen 56', 65'

Suncorp Stadium, Brisbane
Attendance: 26,022
Referee: Belinda Sharpe
Player of the Match: Isabelle Kelly

Game 2

Thursday, 15 May 2025
19:45 AEST

New South Wales	26–6	Queensland
Tries: 5 Simaima Taufa 16'; Olivia Kernick 29', 61'; Jayme Fressard 38'; Jaime Chapman 45'; Goals: 3 Jesse Southwell 3/5 18', 30', 62'	1st: 12–6; 2nd: 14–0; Highlights; Match stats (NRL)	Tries: 1 Tamika Upton 5'; Goals: 1 Lauren Brown 6'

Allianz Stadium, Sydney
Attendance: 16,026
Referee: Belinda Sharpe
Player of the Match: Olivia Kernick

Game 3

Thursday, 29 May 2025
19:45 AEST

New South Wales	14–18	Queensland
Tries: 3 Jessica Sergis 20'; Jayme Fressard 30'; Jocelyn Kelleher 48'; Goals: 1 Jesse Southwell 49'	1st: 8–6; 2nd: 6–12; Highlights; Match stats (NRL)	Tries: 3 Makenzie Weale 7'; Romy Teitzel 53'; Chelsea Lenarduzzi 64'; Goals: 3 Lauren Brown 8', 55', 65'

McDonald Jones Stadium, Newcastle
Attendance: 21,912
Referee: Belinda Sharpe
Player of the Match: Jessika Elliston

=== 2026 ===
Game 1

Thursday, 30 April 2026
19:45 AEST

New South Wales	11—6	Queensland
Tries: 2 Ellie Johnston 45'; Jessica Sergis 70'; Goals: 1 Jesse Southwell 46'; Field goals: 1 Jesse Southwell 62'	1st: 0–6; 2nd: 11–0; NRL Match Centre	Tries: 1 Otesa Pule 2'; Goals: 1 Lauren Brown 3'

McDonald Jones Stadium, Newcastle
Attendance: 20,179
Referee: Belinda Sharpe
Player of the Match: Yasmin Meakes

Game 2

Thursday, 14 May 2026
19:45 AEST

Queensland	10—14	New South Wales
Tries: 2 Rory Owen 31'; Jada Ferguson 43'; Goals: 1 Lauren Brown (1/2) 32'	1st: 6–8; 2nd: 4–6; NRL Match Centre	Tries: 3 Jaime Chapman 7'; Keeley Nizza 22'; Jessica Sergis 46'; Goals: 1 Jesse Southwell (1/3) 48'

Suncorp Stadium, Brisbane
Attendance: 23,846
Referee: Belinda Sharpe
Player of the Match: Jesse Southwell

Game 3

Thursday, 28 May 2026
19:45 AEST

Queensland	4—12	New South Wales
Tries: 1 Jasmine Peters 30'; Goals: nil Lauren Brown (0/1)	1st: 4–4; 2nd: 0–8; NRL Match Centre	Tries: 2 Isabelle Kelly 26'; Jayme Fressard 52'; Goals: 1 Jesse Southwell (2/3) 48', 54'

Cbus Super Stadium, Gold Coast
Attendance: 11,816
Referee: Belinda Sharpe
Player of the Match: Isabelle Kelly
Katrina Fanning Medal
(Player of the Series): Yasmin Meakes

== Under 19 Women's team ==
In 2019, a women's under-18s match was played as a curtain-raiser to the Women's State of Origin match. In 2021, the first Women's Under 19s State of Origin match was played.

== See also ==
- Queensland Residents rugby league team
- Queensland under-20 rugby league team
- Queensland under-18 rugby league team
- Queensland under-16 rugby league team
- List of Women's Interstate Challenge results
