= New South Wales women's rugby league team =

New South Wales Women
Team information
- Nickname: Blues
- Governing body: New South Wales Women's Rugby League
- Region: New South Wales
- Head coach: John Strange
- Home stadium: North Sydney Oval

Team results
- First game
- (1999)
- Biggest win
- New South Wales 32–12 Queensland (Suncorp Stadium, Brisbane, Qld; 1 May 2025)

The New South Wales Women's rugby league team represents the Australian state of New South Wales in Women's rugby league football. Also known as the Blues due to their sky blue jerseys, the team competes in the annual State of Origin series against the neighboring team, the Queensland Women's rugby league team.

== History ==
The first state of Origin match began in 1999. Since that time, a 17-year reign had been completed by the Queensland side.

New South Wales won their first interstate challenge in 2016 after coming so close to winning in 2015, drawing with Queensland 4 all. New South Wales would then win back to back title winning in 2017. In 2018 New South Wales won the first ever Women's State of Origin match which was held at North Sydney Oval in mid-2018.NSW retained the shield with a win once again at North Sydney Oval in 2019.

== Coaches ==
The current coach of the New South Wales team is John Strange.
The table is incomplete, with the coach unknown for 2002, 2003, 2007, 2009, and 2011.

Name	Span	M	W	D	L	W%	Ref.
Name	Jason Tassell	1999	1	0	0	1	0.00%
Tony Ashton		1	0	0	1	0.00%	
Graham Rogers	2001–	?	0	0	?	0.00%	
Graham Willard	–2004	?	0	0	?	0.00%	
Ray Windle	2005–	?	0	0	?	0.00%	
Mel Vayro	–2008–	?	0	0	?	0.00%	
Karen Stuart	2010 –	?	0	0	?	0.00%	
Mark Riddell	2012	1	0	0	1	0.00%	
Mathew Head	2013–2015	3	0	1	2	16.67%	
Ben Cross	2016–2019	3	3	0	0	100.00%	
Andrew Patmore	2019–2020	2	1	0	1	50.00%	
Kylie Hilder	2021–2024	7	3	0	4	42.86%	
John Strange	2025–2026	6	5	0	1	83.33%	

== Players ==
=== Current squad ===
On 22 April 2026, the NSWRL announced the squad for the first match of the three-match series, subsequently played on 30 April 2026. On 6 May 2026, the squad for the second match, played on 14 May 2026, was announced with one change. The squad announced for game three was unchanged in personnel, with just two pairs of jersey swaps.
Table last updated 29 May 2026.

J#	Player	Age	Position(s)	New South Wales					NRLW			Tests	All Stars
J#	Player	Age	Position(s)	Dbt	M	T	G	Pts	Club	CM	TM	Tests	All Stars
1	Abbi Church	28	Fullback	2025	6	1	0	4	Eels	37	37	—	—
2	Jaime Chapman	24	Wing	2023	11	5	0	20	Titans	22	36	5	6
3	Jessica Sergis	28	Centre	2017	16	9	0	36	Roosters	36	46	11	—
4	Isabelle Kelly	29	Centre	2015	19	7	0	28	Roosters	53	55	17	1
5	Jayme Fressard	28	Wing	2025	6	5	0	20	Roosters	30	37	—	—
6	Jocelyn Kelleher	26	Five-eighth	2025	6	1	0	4	Roosters	51	51	—	—
7	Jesse Southwell	21	Halfback	2023	8	0	16	33	Broncos	0	40	—	—
8	Millie Elliott	28	Prop	2019	12	0	0	0	Roosters	18	38	4	—
9	Olivia Higgins	33	Hooker	2024	6	0	0	0	Knights	40	47	4	—
10	Ellie Johnston	25	Prop	2025	6	2	0	8	Sharks	33	48	—	—
11	Kezie Apps	35	Second-row	2014	20	2	0	8	Tigers	21	40	19	2
12	Yasmin Meakes	32	Second-row	2020	14	1	0	4	Knights	41	52	10	—
13	Olivia Kernick	25	Lock	2022	12	2	0	8	Roosters	47	47	7	3 2
14	Keeley Nizza	25	Hooker	2021	13	2	0	8	Roosters	33	56	7	—
15	Kennedy Cherrington	27	Lock, Prop	2021	9	0	0	0	Eels	29	33	6	5
16	Rima Butler	28	Prop	2026	2	0	0	0	Roosters	13	33	—	3
17	Teagan Berry	24	Fullback, Wing	2026	3	0	0	0	Dragons	41	41	—	—
18	Quincy Dodd	26	Hooker	2020	5	0	0	0	Sharks	27	45	2	8
19	Corban Baxter	32	Five-eighth	2015	10	1	0	4	Roosters	31	31	—	1 4
20	Hannah Southwell	27	Second-row, Lock	2018	5	0	0	0	Dragons	12	44	2	—
IJ	Tiana Penitani Gray	30	Second-row	2019	12	4	0	16	Sharks	32	48	1 5	—

Notes

- Age is at 28 May 2026.
- Jesse Southwell kicked a field goal in Game 1 of the 2026 series.
- An injury to Tiana Penitani Gray in game one prompted three positional changes in the team initially named for game two. Hannah Southwell joined the squad on the extended bench. Rima Butler moved from the reserves to the interchange bench. Kezie Apps moved from the interchange bench into the starting line-up.
- For game three, Olivia Higgins who had started at dummy-half in game two in jersey 14, was assigned jersey 9, swapping with Keeley Nizza. Jersey numbers were also swapped for Quincy Dodd and Corban Baxter.
- Millie Elliott missed the 2025 series and 2025 NRLW season and due to pregnancy.
- Keeley Nizza previously played as Keeley Davis.
- Yasmin Meakes played as Yasmin Clydsdale between 2022 and 2025.
- Jesse Southwell changed clubs between the conclusion of the 2025 NRLW season and the 2026 State of Origin series.

Key to icons used in the above table

- Tests: Australia, Samoa and Tonga
- All Stars: Indigenous All Stars, Māori All Stars, All Stars

== Results summary ==
Note: New South Wales score is given first.

Results From 1999 to present
Date	Opponent	Score	Competition	Venue	Attendance	Ref.
4 July 1999	Queensland	16–18	1999 Interstate Challenge	ANZ Stadium, Brisbane		
2000	Queensland	–	2000 Interstate Challenge			
22 July 2001	Queensland	14–34	2001 Interstate Challenge	ANZ Stadium, Brisbane		
23 June 2002	Queensland	16–26	2002 Interstate Challenge	Ipswich		
2003	Queensland	–	2003 Interstate Challenge			
24 July 2004	Queensland	8–40	2004 Interstate Challenge (QLD win series 2–0)	Suncorp Stadium, Brisbane		
31 July 2004	Queensland	8–46	2004 Interstate Challenge (QLD win series 2–0)	EnergyAustralia Stadium, Newcastle		
6 August 2005	Queensland	18–20	2005 Interstate Challenge	Henson Park, Marrickville		
30 July 2006	Queensland	24–40	2006 Interstate Challenge	Suncorp Stadium, Brisbane		
13 August 2007	Queensland	16–38	2007 Interstate Challenge	CUA Stadium, Penrith		
8 July 2008	Queensland	6–8	2008 Interstate Challenge (QLD win series 2–0)	CUA Stadium, Penrith		
9 August 2008	Queensland	4–46	2008 Interstate Challenge (QLD win series 2–0)	Kougari Oval, Brisbane		
18 July 2009	Queensland	14–20	2009 Interstate Challenge	CUA Stadium, Penrith		
26 June 2010	Queensland	6–36	2010 Interstate Challenge	Albert Park, Gympie		
25 May 2011	Queensland	0–26	2011 Interstate Challenge	Suncorp Stadium, Brisbane		
23 June 2012	Queensland	10–34	2012 Interstate Challenge	Centrebet Stadium, Penrith		
7 April 2013	Queensland	12–30	2013 Interstate Challenge	Davies Park, Brisbane		
19 July 2014	Queensland	10–26	2014 Interstate Challenge	Leichhardt Oval, Sydney		
27 June 2015	Queensland	4–4	2015 Interstate Challenge	1300SMILES Stadium, Townsville		
23 July 2016	Queensland	8–4	2016 Interstate Challenge	Cbus Super Stadium, Gold Coast		
23 July 2017	Queensland	22–6	2017 Interstate Challenge	WIN Stadium, Wollongong		
22 June 2018	Queensland	16–10	2018 State of Origin	North Sydney Oval, Sydney	6,824	
21 June 2019	Queensland	14–4	2019 State of Origin	North Sydney Oval, Sydney	10,515	
13 November 2020	Queensland	18–24	2020 State of Origin	Sunshine Coast Stadium, Sunshine Coast	4,833	
25 June 2021	Queensland	6–8	2021 State of Origin	Sunshine Coast Stadium, Sunshine Coast	7,183	
24 June 2022	Queensland	20–14	2022 State of Origin	GIO Stadium, Canberra	11,321	
21 June 2023	Queensland	10–18	2023 State of Origin (1–1, QLD win on aggregate score)	Commbank Stadium, Sydney	12,972	
22 June 2023	Queensland	18–14	2023 State of Origin (1–1, QLD win on aggregate score)	Queensland Country Bank Stadium, Townsville	18,275	
16 May 2024	Queensland	22–12	2024 State of Origin (QLD win series 2–1)	Suncorp Stadium, Brisbane	25,492	
6 June 2024	Queensland	10–11	2024 State of Origin (QLD win series 2–1)	McDonald Jones Stadium, Newcastle	25,782	
27 June 2024	Queensland	6–22	2024 State of Origin (QLD win series 2–1)	Queensland Country Bank Stadium, Townsville	22,819	
1 May 2025	Queensland	32–12	2025 State of Origin (NSW win series 2–1)	Suncorp Stadium, Brisbane	26,022	
26 May 2025	Queensland	26–6	2025 State of Origin (NSW win series 2–1)	Allianz Stadium, Sydney	16,026	
29 May 2025	Queensland	14–18	2025 State of Origin (NSW win series 2–1)	McDonald Jones Stadium, Newcastle	21,912	
30 April 2026	Queensland	11–6	2026 State of Origin (NSW win series 3–0)	McDonald Jones Stadium, Newcastle	20,179	
14 May 2026	Queensland	14–10	2026 State of Origin (NSW win series 3–0)	Suncorp Stadium, Brisbane	23,846	
28 May 2026	Queensland	12–4	2026 State of Origin (NSW win series 3–0)	Cbus Super Stadium, Gold Coast	11,816	

=== Upcoming Fixtures ===
The date and venue of the second of the 2027 three match series was announced by the National Rugby League on 16 November 2026.

- Match 1: Date and venue yet to be announced.
- Match 2: Wednesday, 12 May 2027 at Queensland Country Bank Stadium, Townsville.
- Match 3: Date and venue yet to be announced.

== Results detail ==
=== 2006 ===
30 July 2006

Queensland Women	40 – 24	New South Wales Women
Tries; Steph Hancock 2 Leah Williams 2 Teresa Anderson 1 Karyn Murphy 1 Megan Spicer 1 Goals; Neena Fraser 4 Steph Hancock 1 Megan Spicer 1	Report	Tries; 1 Teina Clark; 1 Dahlia Tahu; 1 Nadine Schmidt; 1 Johnnie Tukwaho Goals; 4 Teina Clark

Suncorp Stadium, Brisbane

=== 2007 ===
13 August 2007
3.30 PM

Queensland Women	38 – 16	New South Wales Women
Tries; Rachele Whelan 2 Bianca Ambrum 1 Teresa Anderson 1 Kellie Batchelor 1 Suzanne Johnson 1 Leah Williams 1 Goals; Kellie Batchelor 5	Report; HT 12-10

CUA Stadium, Penrith

=== 2008 ===
The Woman's Interstate Challenge was played as a two-game series in 2008.

==== Game 1 ====
8 July 2008

Queensland Women	8 – 6	New South Wales Women
Tries; Steph Hancock 1 Tegan Rolfe 1	Report	Tries; 1 Jessica Palmer Goals; 1 Teina Clark

CUA Stadium, Penrith
Player of the Match: Renae Kunst

==== Game 2 ====
9 August 2008

Queensland Women	46 – 4	New South Wales Women
Tries; Bianca Ambrum 3 Suzanne Johnson 2 Tarah Westera 2 Tegan Rolfe 1 Renae Kunst 1 Steph Hancock 1 Goals; Steph Hancock 3	Report; Scores	Tries; 1 Lisa Fiaola

Kougari Oval, Brisbane

=== 2009 ===
18 July 2009
1:40 PM

Queensland Women	20 – 14	New South Wales Women
Tries; Erin Elliott 1 Tahnee Norris 1 Nive Moefaauo 1 Tarah Westera 1 Goals; Natalie Dwyer 1 Tegan Rolfe 1	Report	Tries; 1 Poihaera Clark; 1 Natalie Levy; 1 Jessica Palmer Goals; 1 Renee Gloss

CUA Stadium, Penrith
Player of the Match: Tahnee Norris

=== 2010 ===
26 June 2010

Queensland Women	36 – 6	New South Wales Women
Tries; Latisha Gary 2 Tegan Rolfe 2 Karina Brown 1 Natalie Dwyer 1 Suzanne Johnson 1 Goals; Natalie Dwyer 4	Report; Report	Tries; 1 Kylie Hilder Goals; 1 Teina Clark

Albert Park, Gympie
Referee: Jon Kennedy
Player of the Match: Latisha Gary

=== 2011 ===
25 May 2011

Queensland Women	26 – 0	New South Wales Women
Tries: Natalie Dwyer 1 Bianca Ambrum 1 Natasha Baggow 1 Natalie Gala 1 Karyn Murphy 1 Steph Hancock 1 Goals: Natalie Dwyer 1	Report	Tries: nil Goals: nil

Suncorp Stadium

=== 2012 ===
23 June 2012
3.30 PM

Queensland Women	34 – 10	New South Wales Women
Tries: Bianca Ambrum 4 Natalie Dwyer 2 Karina Brown 1 Karyn Murphy 1 Goals: Amber Saltner 1	Report; QLD Annual Report; HT 16–10	Tries: 1 Tarah Westen; 1 Samantha Hammond; Goals: 1 Maddie Studdon

Penrith Park
Player of the Match: Heather Ballinger

=== 2013 ===
7 April 2013

Queensland Women	30 – 12	New South Wales Women
Tries: Bianca Ambrum 1 Steph Hancock 1 Amber Saltner 1 Joanne Barrett 1 Renae Kunst 1 Tahnee Norris 1 Goals: Amber Saltner 3	QLD Annual Report; Video Snippet; HT 10–6	Tries: 2 Tegan Chandler; Goals: 2 Margaret Watson

Davies Park, West End, Brisbane

=== 2014 ===
19 July 2014

Queensland Women	26 – 10	New South Wales Women
Tries: Renae Kunst 1 Deanna Turner 1 Kellye Hodges 1 Jenni-Sue Hoepper 1 Steph Hancock 1 Goals: Ali Brigginshaw 2 Jenni-Sue Hoepper 1	Report; HT 16–0	Tries: 1 Teina Clark; 1 Kezie Apps; Goals: 1 Maddie Studdon

Leichhardt Oval

=== 2015 ===
27 June 2015

New South Wales Women	4 – 4	Queensland Women
Tries: Isabelle Kelly 1	Report; HT 0–4	Tries: 1 Chelsea Baker

1300SMILES Stadium, Townsville

=== 2016 ===
23 July 2016

New South Wales Women	8 – 4	Queensland Women
Tries: Simaima Taufa 1 Goals: Maddie Studdon 2	Report; HT 0–0	Tries: 1 Ali Brigginshaw

Cbus Super Stadium, Gold Coast
Player of the Match: Kezie Apps

Notes:

- This was the first time New South Wales won the trophy in all women's interstate challenge history.

=== 2017 ===
23 July 2017

New South Wales Women	22 – 6	Queensland Women
Tries: Jessica Sergis 3 Corban McGregor 1 Vanessa Foliaki 1 Goals: Caitlin Moran 1	Report; QRL Annual Report; HT 10–6	Tries: 1 Jenni-Sue Hoepper; Goals: 1 Chelsea Baker

WIN Stadium, Wollongong
Referee: Chris Treneman
Player of the Match: Kezie Apps

=== 2018 ===
22 June 2018

New South Wales Women	16 – 10	Queensland Women
Tries: Isabelle Kelly (7', 54') 2 Nakia Davis-Welsh (36') 1 Goals: Maddie Studdon 2/3 (9', 55')	Report; Highlights; HT 6–6	Tries: 2 (12', 45') Karina Brown; Goals: 1/2 Chelsea Baker (13')

North Sydney Oval, Sydney
Player of the Match: Isabelle Kelly
Attendance: 6,824
Referee: Jon Stone
Peter Gough (Assistant)

Notes:

- First official Women's State of Origin match.

=== 2019 ===
21 June 2019

New South Wales Women	14 – 4	Queensland Women
Tries: Jessica Sergis 1 Shakiah Tungai 1 Maddie Studdon 1 Goals: Kirra Dibb 1	Report; Highlights; HT 0–4	Tries: 1 Tazmin Gray; Goals: nil

North Sydney Oval, Sydney
Player of the Match: Maddie Studdon
Attendance: 10,300
Referee: Belinda Sharpe

=== 2020 ===
13 November 2020
7:45 PM

Queensland Women	24 – 18	New South Wales Women
Tries: Tamika Upton 2 Tarryn Aiken 1 Steph Hancock 1 Goals: Lauren Brown 4	Report; Highlights; HT 6–6	Tries: 1 Kezie Apps; 1 Tiana Penitani; 1 Filomina Hanisi; 1 Botille Vette-Welsh; Goals: 1 Melanie Howard

Sunshine Coast Stadium
Player of the Match: Tarryn Aiken
Referee: Belinda Sharpe

=== 2021 ===
25 June 2021
7:45 PM

Queensland Women	8 – 6	New South Wales Women
Tries: Destiny Brill 1 Goals: Lauren Brown 2	Report; Highlights; HT 6–4	Tries: 1 Isabelle Kelly; Goals: 1 Maddie Studdon

Sunshine Coast Stadium
Attendance: 7,183
Referee: Belinda Sharpe
Player of the Match: Tazmin Gray

=== 2022 ===
24 June 2022
7:45 PM

New South Wales	20 – 14	Queensland
Tries: 3 Emma Tonegato (13') 1 Kirra Dibb (15') 1 Isabelle Kelly (67') 1 Goals: Rachael Pearson 4/5 (14', 17', 27', 41')	HT 14–10; Highlights; Match Stats (NRL); Reports	Tries: 3; 1 (8') Destiny Brill; 1 (21') Tarryn Aiken; 1 (56') Evania Pelite; Goals: 1; 1/2 Ali Brigginshaw (22'); 0/2 Lauren Brown

GIO Stadium, Canberra
Attendance: 11,321
Referee: Belinda Sharpe
Player of the Match: Isabelle Kelly
(Nellie Doherty Medal)

=== 2023 ===
The two-match series was decided — as the teams won one match each — on aggregate, with Queensland winning 32–28.

==== Game 1 ====
1 June 2023
7:45 PM

Queensland	18 – 10	New South Wales
Tries: 4 Julia Robinson (7', 45') 2 Tazmin Gray (32') 1 Emily Bass (40') 1 Goals: 1 Zahara Temara 1/4 (34')	HT 10–6; Highlights; Match Stats (NRL); Reports	Tries: 2; 1 (16') Jessica Sergis; 1 (50') Jaime Chapman; Goals: 1; 1/2 Jesse Southwell (18')

CommBank Stadium, Parramatta
Attendance: 12,972
Referee: Adam Gee
Player of the Match: Keilee Joseph
(Nellie Doherty Medal)

==== Game 2 ====
22 June 2023
7:45 PM

New South Wales	18 – 14	Queensland
Tries: 3 Tiana Penitani (3', 40') 2 Yasmin Clydsdale (68' penalty try) 1 Goals: 3 Jesse Southwell 3/5 (9', 45', 69')	HT 6-14; Highlights; Match Stats (NRL); Reports	Tries: 3; 1 (17') Tamika Upton; 1 (25') Emily Bass; 1 (27') Tarryn Aiken; Goals: 1; 1/3 Zahara Temara (29')

Queensland Country Bank Stadium, Townsville
Attendance: 18,275
Referee: Belinda Sharpe
Player of the Match: Tazmin Gray
(Nellie Doherty Medal)

=== 2024 ===
==== Game 1 ====
16 May 2024
7:45 PM

New South Wales	22 – 12	Queensland
Tries: 3 Emma Tonegato (5') 1 Jaime Chapman (9') 1 Caitlan Johnston (64') 1 Goals: 5 Rachael Pearson 5/5 (6', 10', 18', 38, 65')	HT 14-0; Highlights; Match Stats (NRL); Reports	Tries: 2; 1 (53') Tamika Upton; 1 (67') Emily Bass; Goals: 2; 2/2 Zahara Temara (53', 68')

Suncorp Stadium, Brisbane
Attendance: 25,492
Referee: Kasey Badger
Player of the Match: Yasmin Clydsdale

==== Game 2 ====
Thursday, 6 June 2024
7:45 PM

Queensland	11 – 10	New South Wales
Tries: 2 Shenae Ciesiolka (54') 1 Tarryn Aiken (61')1; Goals: 1 Lauren Brown 1/2 (63'); Field Goals: 1 Lauren Brown 1 (68')	1st: 6–0; 2nd: 4–11; Highlights; Match Stats (NRL); Reports	Tries: 2; 1 (24') Keeley Davis; 1 (58') Tiana Penitani; Goals: 1; 1/2 Rachael Pearson (25')

McDonald Jones Stadium, Newcastle
Attendance: 25,782
Referee: Belinda Sharpe
Player of the Match: Shannon Mato

==== Game 3 ====
Thursday, 27 June 2024
7:45 PM

Queensland	22 – 6	New South Wales
Tries: 3 Evania Pelite (1') 1 Julia Robinson (29') 1 Tazmin Rapana (67') 1 Goals: 5 Lauren Brown 4/4 (3', 8' pen, 31', 68'); Romy Teitzel 1/1 (38' pen)	1st: 14–0; 2nd: 8–6; Highlights; Match Stats (NRL); Reports	Tries: 1; 1 (58') Jaime Chapman; Goals: 1 Rachael Pearson 1/1 (59')

Queensland Country Bank Stadium, Townsville
Attendance: 22,819
Referee: Belinda Sharpe
Player of the Match: Evania Pelite
Nellie Doherty Medal for Player of the Series: Shannon Mato

=== 2025 ===
==== Game 1 ====
1 May 2025
7:45 PM

New South Wales	32 – 12	Queensland
Tries: 6 Jayme Fressard (19', 40') 2 Jessica Sergis (4') 1 Isabelle Kelly (14') 1 Ellie Johnston (50') 1 Abbi Church (64') 1 Goals: 4 Jesse Southwell 4/7 (5', 52', pen 56', 65')	HT 14-12; Highlights; Reports	Tries: 2; 1 (7') Sienna Lofipo; 1 (24') Rory Owen; Goals: 2; 2/2 Lauren Brown (8', 25')

Suncorp Stadium, Brisbane
Attendance: 26,022
Referee: Belinda Sharpe
Player of the Match: Isabelle Kelly

==== Game 2 ====
15 May 2025
7:45 PM

New South Wales	26 – 6	Queensland
Tries: 5 Olivia Kernick (29', 61') 2 Simaima Taufa (16') 1 Jayme Fressard (38') 1 Jaime Chapman (45') 1 Goals: 3 Jesse Southwell 3/5 (18', 30', 62')	HT 12-6; Reports	Tries: 1; 1 (5') Tamika Upton; Goals: 1; 1/1 Lauren Brown (6')

Allianz Stadium, Sydney
Attendance: 16,026
Referee: Belinda Sharpe
Player of the Match: Olivia Kernick

==== Game 3 ====
29 May 2025
7:45 PM

Queensland	18 – 14	New South Wales
Tries: 3 Makenzie Weale (7') 2 Romy Teitzel (53) 3 Chelsea Lenarduzzi (64) Goals: 3 Lauren Brown 3/5 (8', 55', 65')		Tries: 3; 1 (20') Jessica Sergis 2 (30') Jayme Fressard 3 (48') Jocelyn Kelleher; Goals: 1; 1/1 Jesse Southwell (49')

McDonald Jones Stadium, Newcastle
Attendance: 21,912
Referee: Belinda Sharpe

=== 2026 ===
Game 1

Thursday, 30 April 2026
19:45 AEST

New South Wales	11—6	Queensland
Tries: 2 Ellie Johnston 45'; Jessica Sergis 70'; Goals: 1 Jesse Southwell 46'; Field goals: 1 Jesse Southwell 62'	1st: 0–6; 2nd: 11–0; NRL Match Centre	Tries: 1 Otesa Pule 2'; Goals: 1 Lauren Brown 3'

McDonald Jones Stadium, Newcastle
Attendance: 20,179
Referee: Belinda Sharpe
Player of the Match: Yasmin Meakes

Game 2

Thursday, 14 May 2026
19:45 AEST

Queensland	10—14	New South Wales
Tries: 2 Rory Owen 31'; Jada Ferguson 43'; Goals: 1 Lauren Brown (1/2) 32'	1st: 6–8; 2nd: 4–6; NRL Match Centre	Tries: 3 Jaime Chapman 7'; Keeley Nizza 22'; Jessica Sergis 46'; Goals: 1 Jesse Southwell (1/3) 48'

Suncorp Stadium, Brisbane
Attendance: 23,846
Referee: Belinda Sharpe
Player of the Match: Jesse Southwell

Game 3

Thursday, 28 May 2026
19:45 AEST

Queensland	4—12	New South Wales
Tries: 1 Jasmine Peters 30'; Goals: nil Lauren Brown (0/1)	1st: 4–4; 2nd: 0–8; NRL Match Centre	Tries: 2 Isabelle Kelly 26'; Jayme Fressard 52'; Goals: 1 Jesse Southwell (2/3) 48', 54'

Cbus Super Stadium, Gold Coast
Attendance: 11,816
Referee: Belinda Sharpe
Player of the Match: Isabelle Kelly
Katrina Fanning Medal
(Player of the Series): Yasmin Meakes

== Records ==
=== Margins and streaks ===
Biggest winning margins

Margin	Score	Opponent	Venue	Date
20	32—12	Queensland	Suncorp Stadium	1 May 2025
20	26—6	Queensland	Allianz Stadium	15 May 2025
16	22—6	Queensland	WIN Stadium	23 Jul 2017
10	14—4	Queensland	North Sydney Oval	21 Jun 2019
10	22—12	Queensland	Suncorp Stadium	16 May 2024

Biggest losing margins

Margin	Score	Opponent	Venue	Date
42	4–46	Queensland	Kougari Oval, Wynnum	9 Aug 2008
38	8–46	Queensland	Energy Australia Stadium	31 Jul 2004
32	8–40	Queensland	Suncorp Stadium	24 Jul 2004
30	6–36	Queensland	Albert Park, Gympie	26 Jun 2010

== Player awards ==
The following table displays

1. The player of the match (to 2022) or player of the series (since 2023) awards, open to players from both New South Wales and Queensland teams. This award is presented at the conclusion of the series.
2. Awards presented by the New South Wales Rugby League at their Brad Fittler Medal Awards night, typically held towards the end of the club competition seasons. Only New South Wales players are eligible for these awards.

Year	Both Teams		New South Wales						Ref
Year	Player of the Match (2014–2022) Player of the Series (2023–2026)		Player of the Year		Women's Origin Award		Daily Telegraph People's Choice		Ref
Year	Player	Club	Player	Club	Player	Club	Player	Club	Ref
2014			Kezie Apps	Helensburgh Tigers	Not awarded		Not awarded		
2015			Simaima Taufa	PCYC Mount Druitt	Not awarded		Not awarded		
2016	Kezie Apps	Helensburgh Tigers	Kezie Apps	Helensburgh Tigers	Not awarded		Not awarded		
2017	Kezie Apps	Helensburgh Tigers	Simaima Taufa	Mounties	Not awarded		Not awarded		
2018	Isabelle Kelly	CRL Newcastle	Isabelle Kelly	CRL Newcastle	Not awarded		Not awarded		
2019	Maddie Studdon	Cronulla Sharks	Simaima Taufa	Mounties	Not awarded		Not awarded		
2020	Tarryn Aiken	Tweed Heads Seagulls	Hannah Southwell	Central Coast Roosters	Not awarded		Not awarded		
2021	Tazmin Gray	Burleigh Bears	Isabelle Kelly	Central Coast Roosters	Not awarded		Not awarded		
2022	Isabelle Kelly	Sydney Roosters	Isabelle Kelly	Sydney Roosters	Caitlan Johnston	Newcastle Knights	Not awarded		
2023	Tazmin Gray	Burleigh Bears	Emma Tonegato	Cronulla Sharks	Kezie Apps	Wests Tigers	Not awarded		
2024	Shannon Mato	Mackay Cutters	Jaime Chapman	Gold Coast Titans	Yasmin Clydsdale	Newcastle Knights	Not awarded		
2025	Olivia Kernick	Sydney Roosters	Olivia Kernick	Sydney Roosters	Abbi Church	Parramatta Eels	Olivia Kernick	Sydney Roosters	
2026	Yasmin Meakes	Newcastle Knights	Yasmin Meakes	Newcastle Knights	Ellie Johnston	Cronulla Sharks	Jesse Southwell	Brisbane Broncos	

== See also ==
- New South Wales State team
- New South Wales Residents team
- New South Wales Under-20 team
- New South Wales Under-18 team
- New South Wales Under-16 team
- Holden Women's Premiership
- Harvey Norman NSW Women's Premiership
- New South Wales Women's Rugby League
- List of Women's Interstate Challenge results
