= List of Papua New Guinea women's national rugby league team players =

Papua New Guinea rugby league players

This is a list of Papua New Guinea women's national rugby league team players. 37 players have represented Papua New Guinea Orchids since 2017 starting with Orchid #1 Cathy Neap and the latest being Gemma Schnaubelt in 2019 who is PNG Orchid #37.

== Orchids register ==
No.	Name	Selected^{a}	Matches^{b}
1	Cathy Neap	2017	4
2	Naomi Kaupa	2017	1
3	Della Audama	2017	2
4	Joan Kuman	2017	1
5	Anne Oiufa	2017	1
6	Elvina Aaron	2017	2
7	Helen Abau	2017	1
8	Delilah Ahose	2017	1
9	Akosita Baru	2017	2
10	Christie Bulhage	2017	1
11	Brenda Goro	2017	1
12	Martha Karl	2017	1
13	Grace Mark	2017	2
14	Shirley Joe	2017	2
15	Mala Mark	2017	5
16	Janet Michael	2017	1
17	Vanessa Palme	2017	1
18	Vero Waula	2017	1
19	Kia Monaei	2017	2
20	Carol Humeu	2017	1
21	Amelia Kuk	2018	1
22	Seroge Sabumei	2018	1
23	Roswita Kapo	2018	4
24	Janet Johns	2018	1
25	Gloria Kaupa	2018	1
26	Elizabeth Paisoi	2018	2
27	Belinda Gwasamun	2018	1
28	Lila Malabag	2019	1
29	Angela Watego	2019	1
30	Elsie Albert	2019	1
31	Therese Aiton	2019	1
32	Lyannah Allan	2019	1
33	Erswin Kaiat	2019	2
34	Jazmyn Taumafai	2019	1
35	Ua Ravu	2019	1
36	Tahina Booth	2019	1
37	Gemma Schnaubelt	2019	1
