= Tahnee Norris =

Australia international rugby league footballer and coach

Personal information
- Born: 26 June 1974 (age 52) Orange, New South Wales, Australia

Playing information
- Position: Second-row
Representative
Years	Team	Pld	T	G	FG	P
1998–13	Australia	33	6	0	0	24
1999–02	New South Wales	5	0	0	0	0
2003–13	Queensland	13	0	0	0	0
2011–14	Women's All Stars	4	0	0	0	0

Coaching information
Club
Years	Team	Gms	W	D	L	W%
2021–25	Queensland	10	5	0	5	50
2024–26	Papua New Guinea	5	0	0	5	0
	Total	15	5	0	10	33
- Source: As of 16 November 2026

Tahnee Norris (born 26 June 1974) is an Australian professional rugby league coach and former player. She is the former head coach of the Papua New Guinea women's sides.

A member of the NRL Hall of Fame, Norris played for both New South Wales and Queensland during her career. She played in four World Cups for Australia, winning in 2013, and is the most capped Jillaroo of all time.

She was the head coach of Queensland from 2021 to 2025, winning three series.

== Playing career ==
Born and raised in Orange, New South Wales, Norris played netball growing up before moving to Sydney to play for the South Sydney Rabbitohs women's team in the 1990s.

In 1998, Norris made her Test debut for Australia against Fiji on their tour of the country. She was named Player of the Match in her debut game.

Norris would go on to represent Australia a record-setting 33 times over the next 15 years, playing at four World Cups (2000, 2003, 2008 and 2013). In three of those, she was named in the World XIII Team of the Tournament. After losing the 2008 final, she co-captained the team (alongside Karyn Murphy) to Australia's first ever title in 2013.

In 1999, Norris played in the inaugural Women's Interstate Challenge for New South Wales, going on to play five games for the Blues. After relocating to Queensland for work in the early 2000s, Norris began representing the state due to the eligibility laws of the time, which were based on residency.

Norris never lost an Interstate Challenge while playing for Queensland, who won every game from its inception in 1999 until 2016.

In 2011, Norris represented the Women's All Stars against the Indigenous All Stars in the inaugural women's All Stars game. She would also play in 2012, 2013 and 2014.

On 21 August 2024, Norris was one of the inaugural six female players to be inducted into the NRL Hall of Fame.

== Coaching career ==
Following her retirement at the end of the 2014 season, Norris became the strength and conditioning coach for the Jillaroos under head coach Steve Folkes.

In 2015, she became head coach of the Burleigh Bears women's team, winning the South East Queensland Division 1 premiership in her first season in charge. Under Norris, the Bears won six Grand Finals in eight seasons, including the inaugural QRL Women's Premiership Grand Final in 2021.

On 23 March 2021, Norris was appointed head coach of Queensland's State of Origin side. In her first year in charge, Queensland defeated New South Wales 8–6 at Sunshine Coast Stadium.

After losing to New South Wales in 2022, Norris and Queensland regained the shield in 2023 in the first ever two-game series. In 2024, the series was played using a three-game format for the first time with Norris leading the Maroons to a 2–1 series victory.

On 2 September 2024, Norris was appointed head coach of the Papua New Guinea women's team. They competed in the Pacific Championships, losing 84–0 to Australia and 36–0 to New Zealand.

On 7 August 2025, following a 2–1 series loss to New South Wales, Norris stepped down as Queensland coach, confirming that she would not be seeking reappointment to the position.
