= Renae Kunst =

Australia international rugby league player

Personal information
- Born: 5 August 1982 (age 44) Mackay, Queensland, Australia
- Height: 1.73 m (5 ft 8 in)
- Weight: 80 kg (180 lb; 12 st 8 lb)

Playing information
- Position: Second-row
Representative
Years	Team	Pld	T	G	FG	P
2008	Queensland	-				-
2008	Australia	-				-

Renae Kunst is an Australian former international rugby league player.

== Career ==
In 2008, Kunst was named Player of the Tournament at the Queensland Women's State Championships and was named in the Queensland squad for the 2008 Interstate Challenge series. Following the series, Kunst was named in the Australia squad for the 2008 Women's Rugby League World Cup in which the Jillaroos finished as runners-up.

In 2013, Kunst was named in the Australia squad for the 2013 World Cup. Australia won the tournament, and repeated their success at the 2017 World Cup with Kunst co-captaining the team to a 23–16 win over New Zealand in the final. At the start of the tournament, Kunst had announced her retirement following the competition.

Kunst, who had been a NRL Ambassador between 2015 and 2017, became a NRL Community Program Deliverer in 2018.

== Achievements and accolades ==
=== Team ===
- 2013 Women's Rugby League World Cup: Australia – Winners
- 2017 Women's Rugby League World Cup: Australia – Winners
