= Jasmin Allende =

Australian rugby league footballer

Personal information
- Born: 28 August 1996 (age 29) Paddington, New South Wales, Australia
- Height: 165 cm (5 ft 5 in)
- Weight: 75 kg (11 st 11 lb)

Playing information
- Position: Lock
Club
Years	Team	Pld	T	G	FG	P
2019	Sydney Roosters	1	0	0	0	0
Representative
Years	Team	Pld	T	G	FG	P
2015–20	Indigenous All Stars	3	0	0	0	0
2016	New South Wales	1	0	0	0	0
2019	Prime Minister's XIII	1	0	0	0	0
- Source: RLP As of 5 October 2020

Jasmin Allende (born 28 August 1996) is an Australian rugby league footballer who plays for the South Sydney Rabbitohs in the NSWRL Women's Premiership. Primarily a lock, she played for the Sydney Roosters in the NRL Women's Premiership in 2019.

She is a New South Wales, Indigenous All Stars and Prime Minister's XIII representative.

== Playing career ==
A La Perouse Panthers junior, Allende joined the Redfern All Blacks in 2015. In 2016, she made her debut for New South Wales.

In 2017, she was named in the NSWRL Women's Premiership Team of the Year. In 2018, she joined the newly established South Sydney Rabbitohs women's team.

In 2019, she joined the Sydney Roosters NRL Women's Premiership team. In Round 3 of the 2019 NRL Women's Premiership season, she made her debut for the Roosters in a 16–24 loss to the St George Illawarra Dragons.

On 11 October 2019, she represented the Prime Minister's XIII in their 22–14 win over the Fiji Prime Minister's XIII side in Suva.
