= Papua New Guinean Australians =

- (Papua New Guinea) (Australia)
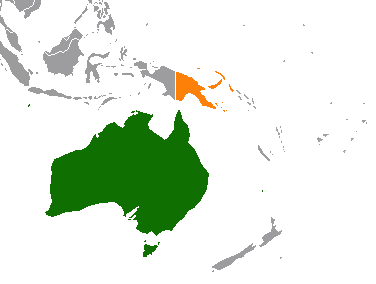

Total population
- 2021 Census: 29,995 (by birth); 22,664 (by ancestry)

Regions with significant populations
- Queensland: 14,500
- New South Wales: 5,428
- Victoria: 2,534
- Western Australia: 1,763
- South Australia: 1,065
- Torres Strait Islands: 365 (by ancestry), 148 (by birth)

Languages
- Australian English · Papua New Guinean English · Tok Pisin · Hiri Motu · Motu · Other Papuan languages

Religion
- Christianity (Predominantly Roman Catholicism) · Other

Related ethnic groups
- Papuans, Aboriginal Australian

Papua New Guinean Australians (Tok Pisin: pipol bilong Papua Niugini long Ostrelia) are the citizens and residents of Australia (including the Torres Strait Islands, where 6.5% of all people claimed Papua New Guinean ancestry) who were born in Papua New Guinea (PNG) or have Papua New Guinean ancestry.

Due to the country's proximity, the vast majority of Papua New Guinean Australians live in Queensland, particularly in Far North Queensland and the Torres Strait Islands. Cairns, the largest city in Far North Queensland, has the highest number of Papua New Guineans than anywhere outside Papua New Guinea itself.

== History ==
A handful of people from Papua New Guinea, crew members of boats and mission-sponsored villagers, visited Australia in the 1870s. In the early 1880s, more than 3000 Papuan workers were recruited to work in the sugarcane industry in Queensland. A majority of these labourers later returned to Papua New Guinea, but a minority remained in Australia.

From 1914 to 1975, Papua New Guinea was administered by Australia, divided into the Territory of Papua and the Territory of New Guinea (a League of Nations mandate). Despite being administered by Australia, the indigenous peoples of the island were nonetheless subject to the White Australia policy. As a result, only limited numbers of Papuans were allowed to enter the rest of Australia, notably to work in the Queensland pearling industry.

The number of Papua New Guineans in Australia is considered relatively small, given the countries are neighbours and PNG's status as a former Australian territory. Other Pacific island countries have much larger populations in Australia.

== Demographics ==
Percentage of people in the Torres Strait Islands with Papua New Guinean ancestry, as of the 2021 census. <5% 5–10% 10–15% 15–20% >20%

At the time of the 2021 Australian census, there were 22,664 people of Papua New Guinean descent in Australia and 29,995 Papua New Guinea-born people residing in the country. The gap between the two figures reflects the fact that many of those born in PNG were the children of Australian expatriates; only 8,752 (less than one-third) of Australian residents born in PNG reported that they were of Papua New Guinean ancestry.

== See also ==
- Portal:Australia
- Papuan people
- Australia–Papua New Guinea relations
