= Nakia Davis-Welsh =

Australia international rugby league player (born 1996)

Personal information
- Born: 22 May 1996 (age 30) Kempsey, New South Wales, Australia
- Height: 156 cm (5 ft 1 in)
- Weight: 63 kg (9 st 13 lb)

Playing information
- Position: Fullback, Five-eighth
Club
Years	Team	Pld	T	G	FG	P
2023	Parramatta Eels	2	0	0	0	0
2024–2025	Cronulla Sharks	12	3	0	0	12
2026	Newcastle Knights	0	0	0	0	0
	Total	14	3	0	0	12
Representative
Years	Team	Pld	T	G	FG	P
2013–17	Indigenous All Stars	5	0	0	0	0
2016–17	New South Wales	2	0	0	0	0
2017	Australia	4	3	0	0	12
- As of 16 September 2026
- Father: Paul Davis
- Relatives: Greg Inglis (cousin)

Nakia Davis-Welsh (born 22 May 1996) is an Australian rugby league player. Primarily a fullback, she is an Australian international and New South Wales representative, and currently plays for Newcastle Knights in the NRLW.

== Background ==
Born in Kempsey, New South Wales, Davis-Welsh is the daughter of former Balmain Tigers five-eighth Paul Davis and the cousin of Australian and Queensland representative Greg Inglis. She attended Hunter Sports High and only began playing organised rugby league in 2012.

== Playing career ==
In 2013, Davis-Welsh, aged 16 at the time, represented the Indigenous All Stars in the annual women's All Stars match.

In 2016, she made her debut for New South Wales in the annual Women's Interstate Challenge against Queensland.

In 2017, she played at fullback in the Redfern All Blacks' NSW Women's Premiership Grand Final win over North Newcastle. She finished as the top try scorer in the competition.

In October 2017, she was named in Australia's 2017 Women's Rugby League World Cup squad. She made her international debut in Australia's opening round win over the Cook Islands. On 2 December, she started at fullback in the Jillaroos 23-16 final win over the New Zealand. She played four games in the tournament, scoring three tries.

In June 2018, Davis-Welsh was announced as one of fifteen marquee signings by the Sydney Roosters women's team which participated in the inaugural NRL Women's Premiership in September 2018. She did not play a match during the season, as it was revealed in October 2018 that she had fallen pregnant.
