= Vanessa Foliaki =

Australia & Tonga international rugby league footballer (born 1993)

Personal information
- Born: 20 August 1993 (age 33) Auckland, New Zealand
- Height: 165 cm (5 ft 5 in)
- Weight: 75 kg (11 st 11 lb)

Playing information
- Position: Second-row, Prop
Club
Years	Team	Pld	T	G	FG	P
2018–20	Sydney Roosters	11	0	0	0	0
2022	Parramatta Eels	7	1	0	0	4
2023–	Cronulla-Sutherland Sharks	20	1	0	0	4
	Total	38	2	0	0	8
Representative
Years	Team	Pld	T	G	FG	P
2014–19	New South Wales	6	1	0	0	4
2014–17	Australia	6	4	0	0	16
2016	Women's All Stars	1	0	0	0	0
2023	Tonga	1	0	0	0	0
- Source: RLP As of 17 November 2026

Vanessa Foliaki (born 20 August 1993) is a New Zealand-born Australian rugby league footballer who plays for the Cronulla-Sutherland Sharks in the NRL Women's Premiership and the Wentworthville Magpies in the NSWRL Women's Premiership.

Primarily a second-rower, she has represented Australia and New South Wales.

== Background ==
Born in Auckland, Foliaki grew up in Māngere, where she played rugby union before moving to Australia in 2010.

== Playing career ==
In Australia, Foliaki first played rugby league for the Orange Hawks. In 2014, Foliaki joined the Canley Vale Dragons in Sydney, and was selected to represent Australia and New South Wales. In 2016, Foliaki moved to Queensland, joining the Burleigh Bears.

In 2017, Foliaki and teammates Karina Brown and Sasha Mahuika left Burleigh to form the Easts Tigers women's team. In December 2017, she was a member of Australia's 2017 Women's Rugby League World Cup-winning squad.

=== 2018 ===
In June, Foliaki represented NSW Country at the Women's National Championships. In July, she joined the Sydney Roosters NRL Women's Premiership team.

In Round 1 of the 2018 NRL Women's season, Foliaki made her debut for the Sydney Roosters, starting at second-row in their 4–10 loss to the New Zealand Warriors. On 30 September, she started at second-row in the Roosters' 12–34 Grand Final loss to the Brisbane Broncos.

=== 2019 ===
On 21 June, Foliaki came off the bench in New South Wales' 14–4 State of Origin win over Queensland at North Sydney Oval. She played three games for the Roosters during their winless 2019 NRL Women's season.

=== 2020 ===
In 2020, Foliaki joined the Mounties RLFC NSWRL Women's Premiership team before moving to the Wentworthville Magpies in August. On 25 October, she started at second-row in the Roosters' 10–20 NRLW Grand Final loss to the Brisbane Broncos.

=== 2022 ===
In early June 2022, the Parramatta Eels announced that Foliaki had signed to play for the club in the 2022 NRL Women's season.

== Achievements and accolades ==
=== Team ===
- 2017 Women's Rugby League World Cup: Australia – Winners
