= Jason Hetherington =

Australia international rugby league footballer (born 1970)

Personal information
- Full name: Jason Hetherington
- Born: 23 August 1970 (age 55) Baralaba, Queensland, Australia
- Height: 1.75 m (5 ft 9 in)
- Weight: 90 kg (14 st 2 lb)

Playing information
- Position: Hooker
Club
Years	Team	Pld	T	G	FG	P
1993	Gold Coast Seagulls	15	3	0	0	12
1994–00	Canterbury Bulldogs	118	13	0	0	52
2001–02	London Broncos	40	9	0	0	36
	Total	173	25	0	0	100
Representative
Years	Team	Pld	T	G	FG	P
1998–00	Queensland	8	0	0	0	0
1998–00	Australia	2	1	0	0	4
- Source: As of 23 October 2019
- Relatives: Kobe Hetherington (son)

Jason Hetherington is an Australian former rugby league footballer who played in the 1990s and 2000s. Hetherington played club football for the Gold Coast Seagulls and Canterbury-Bankstown in Australia and for the London Broncos in the Super League.

== Background ==
Hetherington was born in Baralaba, Queensland, Australia.

== Playing career ==
He established himself as a hooker, but he started his career off as a five-eighth. Hetherington made his first grade debut for the Gold Coast in round 1 1993 against the Western Suburbs at Campbelltown Stadium. Hetherington made 15 appearances in his debut season as the Gold Coast finished last on the table and claimed the wooden spoon.

Hetherington then joined Canterbury in 1994. Hetherington played for Canterbury in their 1994 Grand Final loss against the Canberra Raiders. The following year, Hetherington was part of the Canterbury side which won the 1995 premiership defeating Manly-Warringah in the grand final.

In the 1998 NRL season, Hetherington played 27 games as Canterbury finished 9th on the table and qualified for the finals. Canterbury proceeded to make the 1998 NRL Grand Final after winning 4 sudden death elimination matches in a row including the club's famous preliminary final victory over rivals Parramatta which is considered to be one of the greatest comebacks of all time. After being 18-2 down with less than 10 minutes remaining, Canterbury scored 3 tries to take the game into extra-time before winning the match 32–20.

The following week, he played at hooker for Canterbury in the 1998 NRL grand final loss to the Brisbane Broncos. Hetherington also gained selection for Australia in 1998.

He also played representative football for Queensland, including one Man of the Match performance in the opening game of the 1999 series.

In Super League he played for the London Broncos. In 2000, Hetherington was awarded the Australian Sports Medal for his contribution to Australia's international standing in the sport of rugby league.
