= Ben Cross (rugby league) =

Australian rugby league footballer

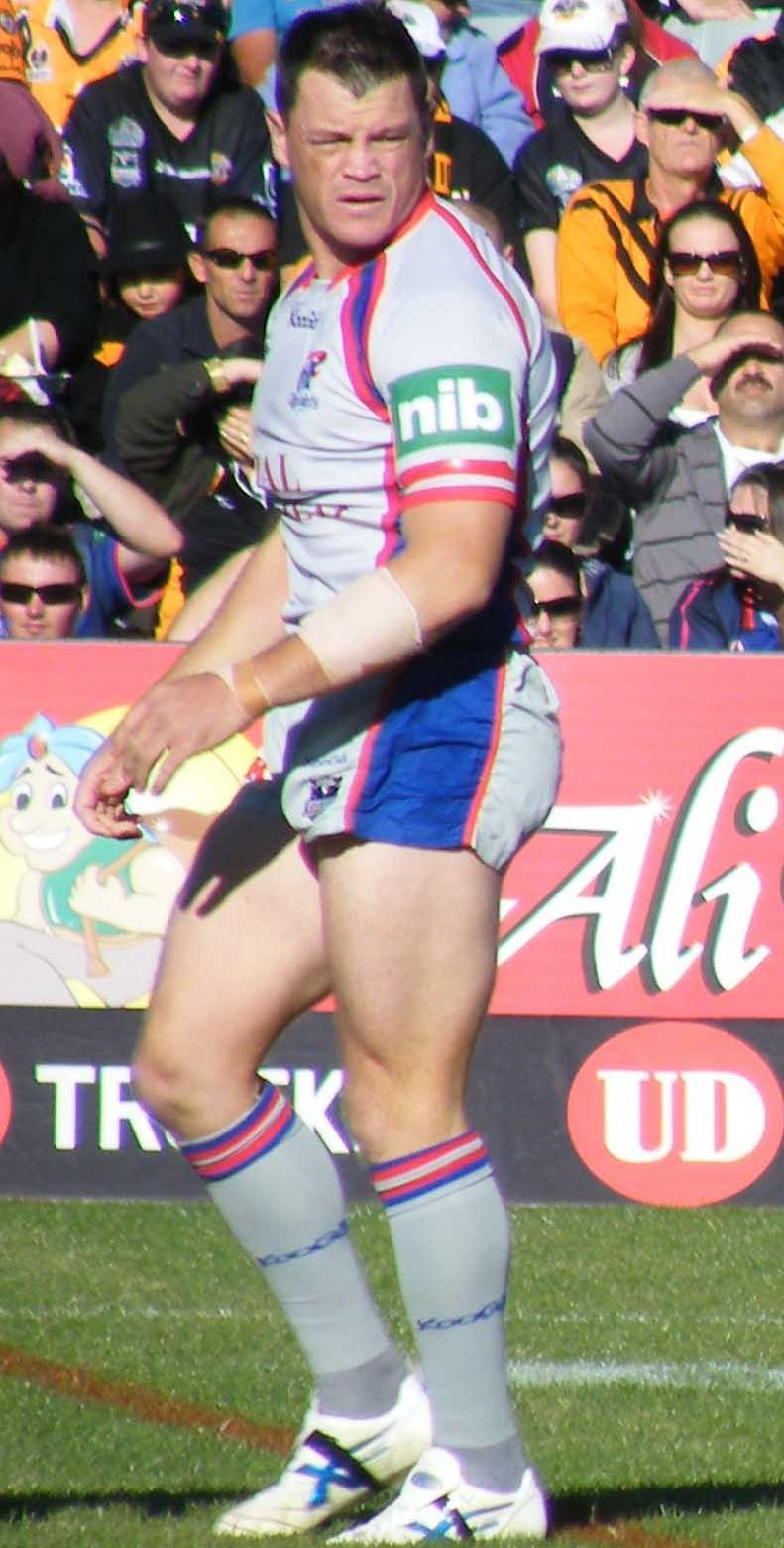
- Cross playing for the Knights in 2009.

Personal information
- Full name: Benjamin Cross
- Born: 6 December 1978 (age 47) Wagga Wagga, New South Wales, Australia
- Height: 191 cm (6 ft 3 in)
- Weight: 112 kg (17 st 9 lb)

Playing information
- Position: Prop
Club
Years	Team	Pld	T	G	FG	P
2003–05	Canberra Raiders	24	0	0	0	0
2006–07	Melbourne Storm	32	0	0	0	0
2008–10	Newcastle Knights	39	0	0	0	0
2011	Leeds Rhinos	10	0	0	0	0
2011	Wigan Warriors	5	0	0	0	0
2012–13	Widnes Vikings	30	2	0	0	8
	Total	140	2	0	0	8
Representative
Years	Team	Pld	T	G	FG	P
2007–08	Country Origin	2	0	0	0	0
2008	New South Wales	2	0	0	0	0

Coaching information
Representative
Years	Team	Gms	W	D	L	W%
2016–19	New South Wales Women	3	3	0	0	100
- Source: Rugby League Project As of 16 November 2026
- Relatives: Matt Cross (brother)

Ben Cross (born 6 December 1978 in Wagga Wagga, New South Wales) is an Australian former professional rugby league footballer and coach. A New South Wales State of Origin representative prop, he previously played for Canberra Raiders, Melbourne Storm, Newcastle Knights, Leeds Rhinos, Wigan Warriors and Widnes Vikings.

== Early life ==
Born at Wagga Wagga, New South Wales. Cross was educated at Batemans Bay High School.

Ben played his junior rugby league for Batemans Bay Tigers.

== Playing career ==
Cross, also known as "The Boss", had an explosive start to his National Rugby League career with a suspension for striking following his début match in 2003. He moved to Melbourne Storm, and they reached the 2006 NRL Grand Final in which Cross was selected to play from the interchange bench in Melbourne's loss to Brisbane. There was another citing for contrary conduct was made against him for an incident in the 2007 NRL Telstra Grand Final. The charge resulted in a two-week suspension.

A powerful ball-runner, Cross endeared himself to Melbourne Storm fans with his wholehearted efforts and aggression. In the 2007 NRL season, Melbourne again reached the grand final where they defeated Manly-Warringah at Telstra Stadium. This premiership was later stripped by the NRL for major and deliberate breaches of the salary cap.

In August, 2008, Cross was named in the preliminary 46-man Kangaroos squad for the 2008 Rugby League World Cup.

Late in 2010, Cross re-signed with Newcastle for 2011, however in October, 2010 Leeds offered Cross a two-year deal. Cross asked the Knights for a release and it was granted. Cross was then released by Leeds mid season by mutual consent. On 12 July 2011 he joined Wigan until the end of the season, and on the same day it was announced he would join Widnes for the 2012 season.

He scored his first ever professional try whilst playing for Widnes against Huddersfield in a victory 26–22 at Halton Stadium.

== Coaching career ==
After the 2013 season, Cross returned to Newcastle, New South Wales to be an assistant coach to the Newcastle Knights' New South Wales Cup team.

On 11 March 2016, Cross was named the head coach of the New South Wales Rugby League Women's side. Andy Patmore replaced him in 2019.

After resigning as the head coach of the New South Wales Rugby League Women's side, Cross moved to Brisbane to be an assistant coach to the Brisbane Broncos' team. The Brisbane Broncos cut Cross from their coaching staff in 2020.

In April 2021, Cross joined the PNG Hunters in the Queensland Cup as a specialist coach.

On 13 October 2021, Cross was named the head coach of the Ipswich Jets' team.

Following a string of losses during the 2024 Queensland Cup season, Cross was sacked by the Jets. During his tenure at Ipswich, the Jets encountered heavy defeats including going winless through the 2023 Queensland Cup season.
