= Amelia Kuk =

Australia & PNG international rugby league footballer

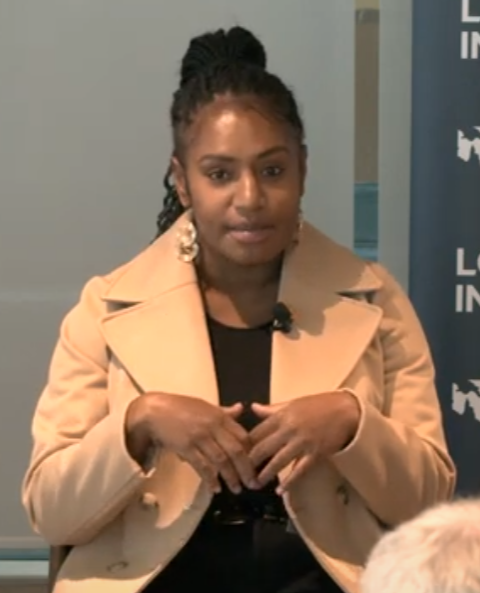
- At a Lowy Institute discussion in 2023

Personal information
- Born: 22 July 1995 (age 30) Mount Hagen, Papua New Guinea
- Height: 176 cm (5 ft 9 in)
- Weight: 73 kg (11 st 7 lb)

Playing information
- Position: Centre, Wing
Club
Years	Team	Pld	T	G	FG	P
2018	Brisbane Broncos	2	0	0	0	0
Representative
Years	Team	Pld	T	G	FG	P
2016–18	Queensland	3	0	0	0	0
2017	Women's All Stars	1	0	0	0	0
2017	Australia	1	0	0	0	0
2017–19	Papua New Guinea	5	0	0	0	0
2018	PNG Prime Minister's XIII	1	0	0	0	0
- Source: RLP As of 24 May 2026

Amelia Kuk (born 22 July 1995) is a Papua New Guinean-Australian rugby league footballer who last played for the Brisbane Broncos in the NRL Women's Premiership.

A centre or winger, she has represented Papua New Guinea, Australia and Queensland.

== Background ==
Kuk was born in Mount Hagen, Papua New Guinea. In 2008, she moved with her family to Perth, Western Australia and later to Brisbane, Queensland.

== Playing career ==
Originally a rugby sevens player, representing Papua New Guinea in the sport, Kuk began playing rugby league in 2016 for the Souths Logan Magpies. Later that year, she represented Queensland in a 4–8 loss to New South Wales.

On 23 September 2017, she made her Test debut for Australia in a 42–4 win over Papua New Guinea. In November 2017, she represented Papua New Guinea at the 2017 Women's Rugby League World Cup.

In June 2018, she represented South East Queensland at Women's National Championships. On 24 July 2018, she signed with the Brisbane Broncos NRL Women's Premiership team.

In Round 1 of the 2018 NRL Women's season, she made her debut in the Broncos' 30–4 win over the St George Illawarra Dragons. On 30 September 2018, she started on the wing in the Broncos' 34–12 Grand Final win over the Sydney Roosters.

In 2020, she played for the Souths Logan Magpies in the inaugural QRL Women's Premiership.
