= Kody House =

Australia international rugby league footballer (born 1990)

Personal information
- Born: 6 June 1990 (age 36) Gladstone, Queensland, Australia
- Height: 177 cm (5 ft 10 in)
- Weight: 79 kg (12 st 6 lb)

Playing information
- Position: Centre
Club
Years	Team	Pld	T	G	FG	P
2018	Brisbane Broncos	1	1	0	0	4
2021–	St. George Illawarra Dragons	1	0	0	0	0
	Total	2	1	0	0	4
Representative
Years	Team	Pld	T	G	FG	P
2015–18	Queensland	4	0	0	0	0
2016	Women's All Stars	1	0	0	0	0
2017	Australia	1	1	0	0	4
- Source: RLP As of 18 October 2020

Kody House (born 6 June 1990) is an Australian rugby league footballer who in 2021 signed to play with Valleys Diehards after previous seasons with Ipswich Brothers and Souths Logan Magpies in the QRL Women's Premiership.

Primarily a centre, she is an Australian and Queensland representative and played for the Brisbane Broncos in the NRL Women's Premiership.

== Playing career ==
In 2014, House began playing rugby league for the Gladstone Raiderettes.

In 2015, while playing for the Calliope Roosters, House made her debut for Queensland in a 4–all draw with New South Wales.

On 23 September 2017, she made her debut for Australia, scoring a try in a 42–4 win over Papua New Guinea.

In June 2018, House represented Queensland Country at the inaugural Women's National Championships. On 14 June 2018, House signed one of 40 historic WNRL Elite contracts across the competition (4 Teams) hers with the Brisbane Broncos for the inaugural season of the NRL Women's Premiership. Injury prevented House from debuting or making an impact on the 2018 NRL Women's season until Round 3, where she made her debut for the Broncos, scoring a try in a 32–10 win over the New Zealand Warriors.

In 2020, House joined Ipswich Brothers in the QRL Women's Premiership. In 2021, House joined Valleys Diehards in the QRL Women's Premiership
