= Corban Baxter =

Australia international rugby league footballer

Personal information
- Born: Corban McGregor; 10 April 1994 (age 32) Auckland, New Zealand
- Height: 173 cm (5 ft 8 in)
- Weight: 78 kg (12 st 4 lb)

Playing information
- Position: Centre, Fullback, Five-eighth
Club
Years	Team	Pld	T	G	FG	P
2019–25	Sydney Roosters	30	10	0	0	40
Representative
Years	Team	Pld	T	G	FG	P
2015–24	New South Wales	8	1	0	0	4
2016–19	Australia	8	3	0	0	12
2016	Women's All Stars	1	0	0	0	0
2019	Australia 9s	4	4	0	0	18
2020–21	Māori All Stars	2	0	0	0	0
- Source: RLP As of 6 November 2020

Corban Baxter (née McGregor; born 10 April 1994) is an Australian international rugby league footballer who plays as a fullback, centre or five-eighth for the Sydney Roosters in the NSWRL Women's Premiership.

Corban is an Australia and New South Wales representative.

== Background and personal life ==
Baxter was born in Auckland, New Zealand, and has Māori ancestry. She moved to Australia with her family at the age of 3. Baxter has a son, who was born when she was aged 16, and has announced she is expecting another child in January 2023.

== Playing career ==
In 2015, Baxter began playing rugby league for the Helensburgh Tigers. That year, she made her debut for New South Wales in a 4-all draw with Queensland.

On 6 May 2016, she made her Test debut for Australia, starting at centre in a 16–26 loss to New Zealand.

On 2 December 2017, Baxter started at centre in Australia's 23–16 2017 Women's Rugby League World Cup final win over New Zealand.

In June 2018, she represented NSW City at the Women's National Championships. On 17 June 2018, she signed for the Sydney Roosters NRL Women's Premiership team. On 22 June 2018, during the inaugural Women's State of Origin, Baxter suffered a shoulder injury, ruling her out of the entire 2018 NRL Women's season.

In Round 1 of the 2019 NRL Women's season, Baxter made her debut for the Roosters in their 12–16 loss to the New Zealand Warriors. In October 2019, she represented Australia at the 2019 Rugby League World Cup 9s, where they lost to New Zealand in the finals.

On 22 February 2020, she represented the Māori All Stars in their 4–10 loss to the Indigenous All Stars.

On 25 October 2020, she started at centre and captained the Roosters in their 10–20 Grand Final loss to the Brisbane Broncos.

On 20 February 2021, she captained the Māori All Stars in their 24–0 win over the Indigenous All Stars.

On 27 June 2022, Corban Baxter announced that due to pregnancy, she had missed the 2022 State of Origin match, and would miss the 2022 NRL Women's season (held from August to early October) and the World Cup (in November 2022).
