= Chelsea Baker =

Australia international rugby league footballer (born 1986)

Personal information
- Born: 17 March 1986 (age 39) Windsor, Queensland, Australia
- Height: 165 cm (5 ft 5 in)
- Weight: 68 kg (10 st 10 lb)

Playing information
- Position: Fullback, Wing, Five-eighth
Club
Years	Team	Pld	T	G	FG	P
2018–19	Brisbane Broncos	7	2	18	0	44
Representative
Years	Team	Pld	T	G	FG	P
2015–19	Queensland	5	1	2	0	8
2016	Women's All Stars	1	0	0	0	0
2016–18	Australia	7	3	10	0	32
- Source: RLP As of 13 October 2021

Chelsea Baker (born 17 March 1986) is an Australian former rugby league footballer who played for the Central Queensland Capras in the QRL Women's Premiership.

Primarily a fullback, she played for the Brisbane Broncos in the NRL Women's Premiership, winning a premiership with them in 2017, and was a Queensland and Australian representative.

== Background ==
Born in Windsor, Queensland, Baker began playing rugby league for the Gladstone Wallabys in 2012.

== Playing career ==
In 2015, Baker made her debut for Queensland, scoring a try in a 4–all draw with New South Wales. On 6 May 2016, she made her Test debut for Australia, starting on the wing in a 16–26 loss to New Zealand.

On 2 December 2017, she started on the wing in Australia's 23–16 Women's World Cup final win over New Zealand. In 2018 and 2019, she represented Queensland Country at the NRL Women's National Championships.

In June 2018, Baker joined the Brisbane Broncos NRL Women's Premiership team and finished the season as the top point scorer in the competition. On 30 September 2018, she started at fullback in the Broncos' 34–12 Grand Final win over the Sydney Roosters. In 2019, she played all three regular season games for the Broncos but was dropped for their Grand Final win over the St George Illawarra Dragons.

In 2020, Baker played for the Central Queensland Capras in the newly established QRL Women's Premiership. In August 2020, Baker, a full-time mother to two children, withdrew from the 2020 NRL Women's Premiership season.

Baker captained the Central Queensland Capras in the 2021 QRL Women's Premiership, primarily playing as a five-eighth. On Friday, November 12th, she announced her retirement from Rugby League.

== Achievements and accolades ==
=== Team ===
- 2017 Women's Rugby League World Cup: Australia – Winners
- 2018 NRLW Grand Final: Brisbane Broncos – Winners
