= Karina Brown =

Australian rugby league footballer (born 1989)

Personal information
- Born: 9 March 1989 (age 36) Warragul, Victoria, Australia
- Height: 168 cm (5 ft 6 in)
- Weight: 70 kg (11 st 0 lb)

Playing information
- Position: Fullback, Wing
Club
Years	Team	Pld	T	G	FG	P
2018–19	Sydney Roosters	7	0	0	0	0
2020	New Zealand Warriors	3	0	0	0	0
2021–24	Gold Coast Titans	22	3	0	0	8
	Total	32	3	0	0	8
Representative
Years	Team	Pld	T	G	FG	P
2010–20	Queensland	9	4	0	0	16
2012–17	Women's All Stars	5	0	0	0	0
2013–18	Australia	11	8	0	0	32
2019	Prime Minister's XIII	1	0	0	0	0
- Source: RLP As of 1 November 2023

Karina Brown (born 9 March 1989) is a former Australian rugby league footballer who last played for the Gold Coast Titans Women in the NRL Women's Premiership and the Burleigh Bears in the QRL Women's Premiership.

A fullback or winger, she represented Queensland and Australia, winning two World Cups in 2013 and 2017.

== Background ==
Born in Warragul, Victoria, Brown moved to the Gold Coast, Queensland with her family at the age of two and attended Marymount College. Brown grew up playing rugby league but was forced to stop when she was 13 years old, as there were no longer any opportunities for her to play competitively.

== Playing career ==
In 2010, she returned to rugby league, playing for the Runaway Bay Seagulls and making her debut for Queensland.

In 2012, after a year off, Brown founded the Burleigh Bears women's team. She captained Burleigh for four years, leading them to two premiership victories in 2015 and 2016.

In 2013, Brown made her first Test debut for the Australia, playing two games in their 2013 Women's Rugby League World Cup-winning campaign.

In 2017, to ensure the ongoing development of women's rugby league in Queensland, Brown and teammates Vanessa Foliaki and Sasha Mahuika left Burleigh to form another women's side, the Easts Tigers in Brisbane. On 2 December 2017, Brown started on the wing in Australia's 23–16 2017 Women's Rugby League World Cup final win over New Zealand.

On 17 June 2018, Brown signed with the Sydney Roosters for the inaugural NRL Women's Premiership season. On 22 June 2018, Brown captained Queensland in the inaugural Women's State of Origin, scoring her side's only two tries in their 10–16 loss to New South Wales.

In Round 1 of the 2018 NRL Women's season, Brown made her debut for the Sydney Roosters, starting on the wing in their 4–10 loss to the New Zealand Warriors. On 30 September 2018, she started at fullback in the Roosters' 12–34 Grand Final loss to the Brisbane Broncos.

On 11 October 2019, Brown captained the Prime Minister's XIII in their 22–14 win over the Fiji Prime Minister's XIII.

In 2020, Brown joined the New Zealand Warriors for the 2020 NRL Women's season.

Brown announced her retirement from top flight rugby league in September 2024.

== Achievements and accolades ==
=== Team ===
- 2013 Women's Rugby League World Cup: Australia – Winners
- 2017 Women's Rugby League World Cup: Australia – Winners
