= 2013 Women's Rugby League World Cup =

Fourth staging of the Women's Rugby League World Cup

2013 Women's World Cup
- Number of teams: 4
- Host country: England
- Winner: Australia (1st title)
- Runner-up: New Zealand
- Matches played: 8
- Points scored: 384 (48 per match)
- Tries scored: 71 (8.88 per match)
- Top scorer: (England) Natalie Gilmour 44 (3t 16g)
- Top try scorer: (Australia) Sam Hammond 8

The 2013 Women's Rugby League World Cup was the fourth staging of the Women's Rugby League World Cup. The tournament was held in Great Britain from 5 July, culminating in the final between Australia and New Zealand on 14 July. It was held at Headingley, Leeds. Four teams took part and these teams were: Australia, England, France and New Zealand.

== Participating teams ==
Each team was to play the other three once during the round robin tournament. The top two finishing teams would then contest the final.

The competition featured four teams: 3 time World Cup champions New Zealand, the tournament hosts England, Australia and France

Team	Nickname	Coach	Captain	RLIF rank
Australia	Jillaroos	Paul Dyer	Karyn Murphy	2
England	Lionesses	Chris Chapman	Natalie Gilmour	3
France				4
New Zealand	Kiwi Ferns	Lynley Tierney-Mani	Sarina Fiso	1

== Round robin ==
=== New Zealand v. France ===
Friday, 5 July 2013

New Zealand	88 – 0	France
Tries: 17; Honey Hireme 5 Karley Te Kawa 3 Sarina Fiso 2 Nora Maaka; Lisa Campbell; Amber Hall; Laura Mariu; Kahurangi Peters; Kelly Maipi; Kathleen Keremete; Goals: 10; Laura Mariu 7 Lisa Campbell 3	Video; Report	Tries: nil Goals: nil

The Tetley's Stadium, Dewsbury, England

=== England v. Australia ===
Friday, 5 July 2013

England	6 – 14	Australia
Tries: 1 Lindsay Anfield; Goals: 1 Lindsay Anfield	Video; Report	Tries: 2 Sam Hammond 2 Goals: 3 Ali Brigginshaw 3

The Tetley's Stadium, Dewsbury, England
Referee: Andy Sweet

=== Australia v. France ===
Monday, 8 July 2013

Australia	72 – 0	France
Tries: 14; Sam Hammond 5 Emma Tonegato 3 Jenni-Sue Hoepper 2 Steph Hancock 2 Joanne Barrett; Jessica Palmer; Goals: 8 Ali Brigginshaw 8	Video; Report	Tries: nil Goals: nil

Post Office Road, Featherstone, England

=== England v. New Zealand ===
Monday, 8 July 2013
3.00 pm

England	16 – 34	New Zealand
Tries: 3 Amy Hardcastle 3 Goals: 2 Natalie Gilmour 2	Report; Report	Tries: 7 Sarina Fiso 2 Akanese Pereira 2 Honey Hireme; Karley Te Kawa; Kelly Maipi; Goals: 3 Laura Mariu 3

Post Office Road, Featherstone, England
Referee: Jamie Bloem

=== Australia v. New Zealand ===
Thursday, 11 July 2013

Australia	6 – 14	New Zealand
Tries: 1 Tarah Westera; Goals: 1 Ali Brigginshaw	Video; Report	Tries: 3 Amber Hall; Nora Maaka; Honey Hireme; Goals: 1 Geneva Webber

Fox's Biscuits Stadium, Batley, England

=== England v. France ===
Thursday, 11 July 2013

England	42 – 4	France
Tries: 8 Holly Myers 3 Katie Cooper-Birkenhead; Natalie Gilmour; Dannielle Titterington; Amy Hardcastle; Tara-Jane Stanley; Goals: 5 Natalie Gilmour 5	Video; Report	Tries: 1 Elisa Ciria; Goals: nil

Fox's Biscuits Stadium, Batley, England

== Third Place Play Off ==
Saturday, 13 July 2013

England	54 – 0	France
Tries: 9 Clare McGinnis 3 Jodie Cunningham 2 Natalie Gilmour 2 Danielle Bound; Kirsty Moroney; Goals: 9 Natalie Gilmour 9	Video; Report	Tries: nil Goals: nil

South Leeds Stadium, Hunslet, England

== Final ==
The fourth Women's Rugby League World Cup were held in Leeds alongside the student and police World Cups, with the final taking place at Headingley, Leeds.

Sunday, 14 July 2013

Australia	22 – 12	New Zealand
Tries 4 Jenni Sue Hoepper; Tarah Westera; Sam Hammond; Heather Ballinger; Goals: 3 Ali Brigginshaw	Video; Report; Report	Tries 1 Sharnita Woodman; Charlotte Arnopp-Scanlan; Aimee Gilbert; Goals: nil

Headingley, Leeds

== See also ==
Rugby league
