= Steph Hancock =

Australian rugby league footballer (born 1982)

Personal information
- Full name: Stephanie Hancock
- Born: 9 March 1982 (age 44) Killarney, Queensland, Australia
- Height: 172 cm (5 ft 8 in)
- Weight: 92 kg (14 st 7 lb)

Playing information
- Position: Prop
Club
Years	Team	Pld	T	G	FG	P
2018–19	Brisbane Broncos	8	0	0	0	0
2020–2024	St George Illawarra	18	0	0	0	0
2021–23	Gold Coast Titans	22	8	0	0	32
	Total	48	8	0	0	32
Representative
Years	Team	Pld	T	G	FG	P
2003–18	Australia	20	5	0	0	20
2004–20	Queensland	16	7		0	30
2011–17	Women's All Stars	7	0	0	0	0
- Source: As of 1 November 2023
- Father: Rohan Hancock

Stephanie Hancock (born 9 March 1982) is an Australian rugby league footballer who plays for the St. George Illawarra Dragons in the NRL Women's Premiership.

Primarily a prop, she is a Queensland and Australia representative, winning two World Cups in 2013 and 2017. She previously played for the Brisbane Broncos, winning two premierships in 2018 and 2019.

== Background ==
Born in Killarney, Queensland, Hancock played her junior rugby league for the Eastern Suburbs Hornets in Warwick.

Her father, Rohan, is a former Queensland and Australian representative. They are the first ever father-daughter pair to represent Queensland and Australia.

== Playing career ==
In 2003, Hancock made her Test debut for Australia at the 2003 Women's Rugby League World Cup. In 2004, she made her debut for Queensland in their win over New South Wales at Suncorp Stadium. Hancock became a regular for both Australia and Queensland over the next 15 years, playing in nine straight wins for Queensland.

In 2008, she played in her second World Cup, with Australia losing 0–34 to New Zealand in the final. On 14 July 2013, Hancock was a member of the Australian side that defeated New Zealand 22–12 in the World Cup final at Headingley Rugby Stadium.

On 7 November 2014, she was named captain of Australia, a position she held until 2017, replacing the retiring Karyn Murphy. On 2 December 2017, she started at prop for Australia in their 23–16 World Cup final win over New Zealand at Suncorp Stadium.

=== 2018 ===
In June, Hancock represented Queensland Country at the inaugural Women's National Championships. On 21 June, she signed with the Brisbane Broncos NRL Women's Premiership team.

In Round 1 of the 2018 NRL Women's season, Hancock made her debut in the Broncos' 30–4 win over the St George Illawarra Dragons. On 30 September, she came off the bench in the Broncos' 34–12 Grand Final win over the Sydney Roosters.

=== 2019 ===
In May, she represented Queensland Country at the Women's National Championships. On 6 October, she came off the bench in the Broncos' 30–6 Grand Final win over the Dragons.

=== 2020 ===
On 24 September, Hancock joined the St George Illawarra Dragons for the 2020 NRL Women's season.

On 13 November, Hancock scored a try in Queensland's 24–18 State of Origin win over New South Wales. She retired from representative rugby league following the match, her 16th for Queensland.

== Achievements and accolades ==
=== Individual ===
- QRL Representative Player of the Year: 2013, 2018

=== Team ===
- 2013 Women's Rugby League World Cup: Australia – Winners
- 2017 Women's Rugby League World Cup: Australia – Winners
- 2018 NRLW Grand Final: Brisbane Broncos – Winners
- 2019 NRLW Grand Final: Brisbane Broncos – Winners
