= Sam Bremner =

Australia international rugby league footballer (born 1991)

Personal information
- Full name: Samantha Bremner
- Born: Samantha Hammond; 19 December 1991 (age 34) Sydney, New South Wales, Australia

Playing information
- Height: 165 cm (5 ft 5 in)
- Weight: 63 kg (9 st 13 lb)
- Position: Fullback
Club
Years	Team	Pld	T	G	FG	P
2018–20	St George Illawarra	4	1	0	0	4
2022–24	Sydney Roosters	15	8	0	0	32
	Total	19	9	0	0	36
Representative
Years	Team	Pld	T	G	FG	P
2012–18	New South Wales	7	1	0	0	4
2013–22	Australia	9	14	0	0	56
2013–17	Women's All Stars	5	1	0	0	4

Samantha Bremner (née Hammond; born 19 December 1991) is an Australian former rugby league footballer who played as a fullback for the Sydney Roosters and St George Illawarra Dragons in the NRL Women's Premiership and the Cronulla-Sutherland Sharks in the NSWRL Women's Premiership.

She is also a former New South Wales and Australia representative, winning three World Cups.

== Background ==
Bremner was born in Sydney. Her father, Gary Hammond, was a professional rugby league player for the Cronulla-Sutherland Sharks and Illawarra Steelers in the 1980s.

== Playing career ==
In 2012, while playing for the Helensburgh Tiger Lillies, Bremner made her debut for New South Wales, scoring a try in a 10–34 loss to Queensland. In July 2013, she was a member of Australia's World Cup-winning squad, scoring five tries in a 72–0 win over France and a try in the final against New Zealand.

In 2017, Bremner was a member of Australia's World Cup-winning squad but missed the final due to injury.

In June 2018, she joined the St George Illawarra Dragons NRL Women's Premiership team, being named captain. In July 2018, Bremner represented New South Wales Country at the NRL Women's National Championships, winning the Player of the Carnival award.

In Round 1 of the 2018 NRL Women's season, she made her debut in the Dragons' 4–30 loss to the Brisbane Broncos, scoring the Dragons only try. She fractured her toe in the loss, ruling her out for the season.

In 2019, Bremner sat out the 2019 NRL Women's season due to the birth of her first child. Instead, she joined the team's coaching staff as an assistant coach.

In February 2020, she returned to rugby league, captaining the Dragons successful 2020 NRL Nines side. In Round 1 of the 2020 NRL Women's season, she played her first NRLW game in 755 days in a 4–18 loss to the Sydney Roosters.

In September 2022, Bremner was named in the Dream Team announced by the Rugby League Players Association. The team was selected by the players, who each cast one vote for each position.

On July 19, Bremner announced that she would return to the Sydney Roosters after Corban Baxter did her ACL 1 week out from the season kick off.

== Achievements and accolades ==
=== Individual ===
- RLPA Players' Champion: 2016

=== Team ===
- 2013 Women's Rugby League World Cup: Australia – Winners
- 2017 Women's Rugby League World Cup: Australia – Winners
- 2021 Women's Rugby League World Cup: Australia – Winners
