= Maddie Studdon =

Australia international rugby league footballer

Personal information
- Full name: Maddison Studdon
- Born: 16 October 1994 (age 32) Mascot, New South Wales, Australia
- Height: 154 cm (5 ft 1 in)
- Weight: 59 kg (9 st 4 lb)

Playing information
- Position: Halfback
Club
Years	Team	Pld	T	G	FG	P
2018	Sydney Roosters	2	0	0	0	0
2019–20	St George Illawarra	6	0	8	0	16
2022	Parramatta Eels	5	1	7	1	19
2023–24	Cronulla Sharks	1	0	0	0	0
2025–	St George Illawarra	1	0	1	0	2
	Total	15	1	16	1	37
Representative
Years	Team	Pld	T	G	FG	P
2014–17	Women's All Stars	3	0	0	0	0
2014–17	Australia	6	1	13	0	30
2012–19	New South Wales	6	1	6	0	16
- Source: As of 2 November 2026

Maddison Studdon (born 16 October 1994) is an Australian rugby league footballer who plays for the St George Illawarra Dragons in the NRLW.

Primarily a halfback, she is an Australian and New South Wales representative.

== Background ==
Studdon began playing rugby league as a four-year old for Mascot Jets. She continued to play until she was too old and then switched to touch rugby.

== Playing career ==
In 2010, she returned to rugby league, making her senior debut for the Helensburgh Tiger Lillies, playing for the club until 2014. In 2016, she began playing for Cronulla-Caringbah Sharks.

In 2017, she was a member of the Jillaroos 2017 Women's Rugby League World Cup winning side.

In 2018, she captained New South Wales in the inaugural Women's State of Origin, which New South Wales won 16–10.

In June 2018, Studdon was announced as one of the fifteen marquee signings by the Sydney Roosters women's team. Later that year, she played for the Wests Tigers team in the inaugural NRL Touch Premiership, which they won.

In Round 1 of the 2018 NRL Women's Premiership, Studdon made her debut for the Sydney Roosters, starting at halfback in their 10–4 loss to the New Zealand Warriors.

On 14 June 2019, she signed with the St. George Illawarra Dragons for the 2019 NRL Women's season.
