= Tazmin Gray =

Australia international rugby league footballer (born 1995)

Personal information
- Born: 4 August 1995 (age 30) Tweed Heads, New South Wales, Australia
- Height: 174 cm (5 ft 9 in)
- Weight: 90 kg (14 st 2 lb)

Playing information
- Position: Second-row
Club
Years	Team	Pld	T	G	FG	P
2018	Sydney Roosters	4	1	0	0	4
2019	Brisbane Broncos	4	0	0	0	0
2020	New Zealand Warriors	3	0	0	0	0
2021	Gold Coast Titans	4	1	0	0	4
2023–25	Brisbane Broncos	16	5	0	0	12
	Total	31	7	0	0	20
Representative
Years	Team	Pld	T	G	FG	P
2016–	Queensland	11	2	0	0	4
2017	Women's All Stars	1	0	0	0	0
2018	Australia	1	1	0	0	4
2019–21	Māori All Stars	2	0	0	0	0
- Source: RLP As of 8 December 2020
- Education: Palm Beach Currumbin State High School
- Relatives: Jordan Rapana (brother)

Tazmin Gray (born 4 August 1995) is an Australian retired rugby league footballer who last played for the Gold Coast Titans in the NRL Women's Premiership and the Burleigh Bears in the QRL Women's Premiership.

Primarily a second-rower, she has represented Australia and Queensland and won an NRL Women's Premiership with the Brisbane Broncos.

== Background ==
Born in Tweed Heads, New South Wales, Gray played her junior rugby league for the Tugun Seahawks and Currumbin Eagles and attended Palm Beach Currumbin State High School.

Her brother, Jordan Rapana, is a professional rugby league player who has represented New Zealand and the Cook Islands.

== Playing career ==
In 2016, Gray began playing rugby league for the Burleigh Bears. In June 2016, she made her debut for Queensland in their 4–8 loss to New South Wales.

On 10 February 2017, she started at second-row for the Women's All Stars in their 4–14 loss to the Indigenous All Stars.

=== 2018 ===
In June, she represented South East Queensland at the Women's National Championships. In July, she joined the Sydney Roosters NRL Women's Premiership team.

In Round 1 of the 2018 NRL Women's season, she made her debut for the Roosters in their 4–10 loss to the New Zealand Warriors. On 30 September, she started at second-row in the Roosters' Grand Final loss to the Brisbane Broncos, scoring a try.

On 13 October, she made her international debut for Australia, starting at second-row and scoring a try in a 26–24 win over New Zealand.

=== 2019 ===
On 15 February, she represented the Māori All Stars in their 8–4 win over the Indigenous All Stars.

In May, Gray represented South East Queensland at the Women's National Championships. In July, she signed with the Brisbane Broncos NRLW team.

On 6 October, she started at second-row in the Broncos' 30–6 Grand Final win over the St George Illawarra Dragons. That day, Gray and her brother Jordan, became the first brother and sister to play on NRL Grand Final day when Rapana played for the Canberra Raiders in the 2019 NRL Grand Final.

=== 2020 ===
On 18 September, Gray joined the New Zealand Warriors for the 2020 NRL Women's season. In Round 1 of the 2020 NRL Women's season, she made her debut for the Warriors in a loss to the Broncos, becoming the first person to play for three NRLW teams.

On 13 November, Gray started at second-row for Queensland in their 24–18 State of Origin win over New South Wales.

=== 2021 ===
On 20 February, Gray represented the Māori All Stars in their 24–0 win over the Indigenous All Stars.

During 2021, she signed with the Gold Coast Titans, one of three new NRLW franchises. In doing so she became the first player in the NRLW to play for four different clubs, and in four consecutive seasons.

=== 2023 ===
On 1 June, Gray played in game 1 of the women's state of origin series in Queensland win 18–10, scoring a try, and again in the second and last game of the series in the QLD loss to NSW 18–14. She finished the series starting both games for Queensland and scored one try.

Gray returned to the Brisbane Broncos for her second stint and second year after three years away at two different clubs. She made her return match in round 1 of the NRLW season on 22 July in the Brisbane Broncos 36–18 loss against the Sydney Roosters. She finished her return year playing all ten games for the Broncos, including their elimination final loss against eventual premiers, Newcastle Knights. She scored four tries, her highest try scoring tally in any of her NRLW seasons.

=== 2024 ===
Gray earned another call up for the Queensland, starting at backrow for the first two games in the first women's three-game series.

=== 2025 ===
On 7 May, Gray announced her medical retirement from the NRLW.
