= 2020 NRL Women's Grand Final =

NRLW Grand Final

2020 NRL Women's Premiership Grand Final

Brisbane Broncos	Sydney Roosters
20	10
	1	2	Total
BRI	12	8	20
SYD	10	0	10
- Date: 25 October 2020
- Stadium: ANZ Stadium
- Location: Sydney, New South Wales, Australia
- Karyn Murphy Medal: Amber Hall
- Referee: Belinda Sharpe

Broadcast partners
- Broadcasters: Nine Network

The 2020 NRL Women's Premiership Grand Final was the conclusive and premiership-deciding game of the 2020 National Rugby League Women's season in Australia. It was contested between the Brisbane Broncos and the Sydney Roosters on 25 October at Accor Stadium in Sydney.

The match was followed by the National Rugby League grand final. Unlike 2019 and 2022 onwards, there was no NRL State Championship match in 2020 due to the NSW Cup competition being suspended due to the COVID-19 pandemic.

The match was broadcast live throughout Australia by the Nine Network.

== Background ==
The 2020 NRL Women's season was the 3rd season of semi-professional women's rugby league in Australia. The season was originally planned to start in September 2020 but was postponed to October 2020 due to the COVID-19 pandemic.

All three rounds were played as the first two matches in triple-headers prior to and with an NRL (men’s) final series match. The NRL games were Canberra Raiders versus Cronulla-Sutherland Sharks at GIO Stadium on 3 October, Parramatta Eels versus South Sydney Rabbitohs on 10 October at Bankwest Stadium, and Penrith Panthers versus South Sydney Rabbitohs at ANZ Stadium on 17 October 2020. On each game day, time was allowed between the three matches for the players from the earlier game to clear the field before players from the next game took the field to warm-up. Other measures to mitigate against the potential spread of Covid-19 included the NRLW players using temporary marquee tents as change rooms in Canberra.

The Broncos and Roosters both won their first two games, defeating the other teams in the four-team competition, the Dragons and Warriors. This meant that the Grand Finalists were decided before the third and final round. The Round 3 match between the Roosters and Broncos was effectively a dress rehearsal at the same venue to be used for the Grand Final eight days later.

In their Round 3 match the Broncos opened the scoring against the Roosters in the eleventh minute with a converted try. This action was repeated three minutes later, albeit with a sideline conversion, to establish a 12–0 lead. The Roosters responded with a try on the left wing less than three minutes prior to the break to trail by eight points at half-time. The Roosters scored a converted try two minutes into the second stanza to reduce the margin to two. The response from Broncos was quick, as they scored two further converted tries in the next eight minutes, to lead 24–10 with twenty minutes to play. With eight minutes to play, Roosters five-eighth Corban McGregor intercepted a pass from Broncos five-eighth Raecene McGregor are ran 90 metres to score a converted try. No further score was registered, the Broncos winning 24–16.

Route to the Grand Final
Team	Regular season		
Team	1	2	3
Brisbane Broncos	28–14	18–4	24–16
Brisbane Broncos	N	N	N
Sydney Roosters	18–4	22–12	16–24
Sydney Roosters	N	N	N
Key: H = Home venue; A = Away venue; N = Neutral venue

== Pre-match ==
=== Broadcasting ===
The match was broadcast live on the Nine Network in Australia and 9Now and on Sky Sport in New Zealand. Radio broadcasters included ABC, Triple M, 2GB, 4BC and NRL Nation.

=== Officiating ===
Belinda Sharpe was appointed as the referee for the NRLW Grand Final for the first time. Jared Maxwell was appointed as the video referee in the NRL Bunker. Liam Kennedy and Drew Oultram were appointed as the touch judges.

== Squads ==
Initial team lists of 21 players were announced on the Tuesday afternoon prior to match, 20 October 2020.

Brisbane Broncos
Pos	J#	Player	Age	Matches			
Pos	J#	Player	Age	NRLW		Representative	
Pos	J#	Player	Age	2020	Career	State	Tests
FB	1	Tamika Upton	23	3	6	—	—
WG	2	Shenae Ciesiolka	23	2	2	—	—
CE	3	Julia Robinson	22	3	10	—	1
CE	4	Jayme Fressard	23	2	2	—	—
WG	5	Meg Ward	26	3	9	2	3
FE	6	Raecene McGregor	23	3	10	—	6
HB	13	Tarryn Aiken	21	3	7	—	—
PR	8	Millie Boyle	22	3	7	1	1
HK	9	Lauren Brown	25	3	3	—	—
PR	16	Shannon Mato	22	3	3	—	—
SR	11	Amber Hall	25	2	6	—	6
SR	12	Tallisha Harden	28	3	7	2	2
LK	7	Ali Brigginshaw	30	3	11	9	17
IN	14	Annette Brander	27	3	10	5	10
IN	15	Jessika Elliston	23	3	4	1	—
IN	10	Chelsea Lenarduzzi	24	3	10	2	1
IN	17	Chanté Temara	19	1	1	—	—
CS	21	Lavinia Gould	37	2	10	—	—
—	18	Romy Teitzel	21	1	1	—	—
—	19	Tyler Birch	24	2	2	—	—
—	20	Zara Canfield	19	0	0	—	—

Sydney Roosters
Pos	J#	Player	Age	Matches			
Pos	J#	Player	Age	NRLW		Representative	
Pos	J#	Player	Age	2020	Career	State	Tests
FB	19	Botille Vette-Welsh	24	1	6	1	1
WG	1	Shanice Parker	22	3	4	—	—
CE	3	Corban McGregor	26	3	6	5	7
CE	4	Yasmin Meakes	26	3	3	—	—
WG	5	Brydie Parker	21	3	5	—	—
FE	6	Melanie Howard	27	1	6	—	—
HB	7	Zahara Temara	23	3	10	2	5
PR	8	Simaima Taufa	26	2	8	6	9
HK	9	Nita Maynard	28	3	10	1	8
PR	10	Filomina Hanisi	19	3	3	—	—
SR	11	Vanessa Foliaki	27	3	10	6	6
SR	12	Sarah Togatuki	23	3	6	—	1
LK	13	Hannah Southwell	21	2	8	2	2
IN	14	Quincy Dodd	20	3	4	—	—
IN	15	Kennedy Cherrington	21	3	3	—	—
IN	16	Grace Hamilton	28	2	2	—	—
IN	17	Jocelyn Kelleher	20	3	3	—	—
CS	18	Amelia Mafi	25	1	1	—	—
—	2	Taleena Simon	27	1	5	1	—
—	20	Bobbi Law	23	1	2	—	—
—	21	Kaitlyn Phillips	23	2	2	—	—

Notes:

- The tally of matches played in the above tables are prior to the Grand Final.
- Age is as at the date of the Grand Final, 25 October 2020.
- Line-up changes from the two teams previous meeting, eight days prior, were:
  - Broncos: Jayme Fressard in for Tyler Birch at centre. Amber Hall returned from suspension for Jessika Elliston, who moved to the bench, displacing Romy Teitzel from the seventeen.
  - Roosters: Zahara Temara fullback to halfback, Corban McGregor five-eighth to centre, Melanie Howard halfback to five-eighth, and Brydie Parker centre to wing. Taleena Simon (wing) was replaced by Botille Vette-Welsh (fullback). Simaima Taufa replaced Grace Hamilton at prop, who dropped to the bench. Hannah Southwell replaced Kennedy Cherrington at lock, who dropped to the bench. Amelia Mafi and Kaitlyn Phillips dropped off the interchange bench.
- Going into the Grand Final, Meg Ward (Broncos) lead the 2020 top point scorer list with 26 points from one try and 11 goals. Zahara Temara (Roosters) was in second place with 20 points from a try, and eight goals.
  - The two goals by Meg Ward and one goal by Zahara Temara in the Grand Final Maintained their positions.
- The goal-kicking conversion rates for the 2020 season prior to the match were:
  - Meg Ward (Broncos) 91.67% having kicked 11 conversions from 12 attempts.
  - Zahara Temara (Roosters) 72.73% having kicked seven conversions and one penalty goal from eleven attempts.
- Going into the match, the Grand Final participants placed highest in the 2020 top try scorer list were Tamika Upton (Broncos) in first place with four tries. Corban Baxter (Roosters), Quincy Dodd (Roosters) and Julia Robinson were three of five players sharing third place on two tries.
  - The try by Upton in the Grand Final confirmed her first placing. The try by Quincy Dodd elevated her into equal second place alongside Evania Pelite (Warriors) on three tries.

== Match summary ==
The Broncos won their third premiership in the third season of the competition.

2020 NRL Women's Premiership Grand Final

Sunday, 25 October
4:05pm AEDT (UTC+11)

Brisbane Broncos	20—10	Sydney Roosters
Tries: 4 Tamika Upton (3'); Amber Hall (8’); Chelsea Lenarduzzi (34’); Tallisha Harden {44’); Goals: 2 Meg Ward 2/4 (5' 9’)	1st: 12–10; 2nd: 8–0	Tries: 2 Yasmin Meakes (13'); Quincy Dodd (25'); Goals: 1 Zahara Temara 1/2 (26')

ANZ Stadium, Sydney
Referee: Belinda Sharpe
Video referee: Jared Maxwell
Touch judges: Liam Kennedy, Drew Oultram
Karyn Murphy Medal: Amber Hall
Official NRL Website: Match Centre
Highlights: YouTube by NRL on Nine

== Post-match ==
From the 34 players who took the field in this Grand Final, 22 were selected for and played in the State of Origin match on 13 November 2020. With one exception each, the Broncos supplied Queensland players and the Roosters supplied New South Wales players. Twelve of the 22 players made their interstate debut, six from each grand finalist, and six for each state.

- Broncos
  - New South Wales: Millie Boyle
  - Queensland debutants: Tamika Upton, Shenae Ciesiolka, Julia Robinson, Lauren Brown, Tarryn Aiken, Shannon Mato
  - Queensland returnees: Tallisha Harden, Ali Brigginshaw, Annette Brander, Chelsea Lenarduzzi
- Roosters
  - Queensland: Zahara Temara
  - New South Wales debutants: Shanice Parker, Yasmin Meakes, Melanie Howard, Filomina Hanisi, Sarah Togatuki, Quincy Dodd
  - New South Wales returnees: Botille Vette-Welsh, Corban McGregor, Simaima Taufa, Hannah Southwell

Players to have changed their name since this Grand Final include:

- Millie Boyle to Millie Elliott
- Corban McGregor to Corban Baxter
- Yasmin Meakes to Yasmin Clydsdale
- Nita Maynard to Nita Maynard-Perrin
- Amelia Mafi to Amelia Huakau
