= 2019 NRL Women's season results =

Second season of professional women's rugby league in Australia

The 2019 NRL Women's Premiership is the second season of professional women's rugby league in Australia. The competition coincided with the 2019 NRL Finals Series.

All times are in AEST (UTC+10:00) on the relevant dates.

== Round 1 ==
Home	Score	Away	Match Information			
Home	Score	Away	Date and Time	Venue	Referee	Attendance
Sydney Roosters	12 – 16	New Zealand Warriors	14 Sep 2019	AAMI Park	Ziggy Przeklasa-Adamski, Daniel Schwass	
St. George Illawarra Dragons	4 – 14	Brisbane Broncos	15 Sep 2019	Bankwest Stadium	Adam Cassidy, Martin Jones	6,609
Source: LeagueUnlimted.com NRL.com NZW-SR Highlights NZW-SR Replay BB-SGID Highlights BB-SGID Replay

== Round 2 ==
Home	Score	Away	Match Information			
Home	Score	Away	Date and Time	Venue	Referee	Attendance
Brisbane Broncos	20 – 0	Sydney Roosters	21 Sep 2019	AAMI Park	Adam Cassidy, Martin Jones	
New Zealand Warriors	6 – 26	St. George Illawarra Dragons	22 Sep 2019	Mt. Smart Stadium	Kasey Badger, Ethan Menchin	2,518
Source: LeagueUnlimited.com NRL.com BB-SR Highlights BB-SR Replay SGID-NZW Highlights SGID-NZW Replay

== Round 3 ==
Home	Score	Away	Match Information			
Home	Score	Away	Date and Time	Venue	Referee	Attendance
Brisbane Broncos	8 – 10	New Zealand Warriors	28 Sep 2019	Sydney Cricket Ground	Ziggy Przeklasa-Adamski, Ethan Menchin	6,208
St. George Illawarra Dragons	24 – 16	Sydney Roosters	29 Sep 2019	Leichhardt Oval	Kasey Badger, Daniel Schwass	2,293
Source: LeagueUnlimited.com NRL.com NZW-BB Highlights NZW-BB Replay SGID-SR Highights SGID-SR Replay

== Grand Final ==
Sunday, 6 October
4:05pm

Brisbane Broncos	30 – 6	St. George Illawarra Dragons
Tries: Lavinia Gould (3') 1 Raecene McGregor (15') 1 Julia Robinson (39') 1 Chelsea Lenarduzzi (41') 1 Amber Pilley (48') 1 Goals: Meg Ward 5/6 (17', 32', 40', 42', 49')	1st: 10 – 0; 2nd: 20 – 6 Highlights; Replay; Reports	Tries: Kezie Apps (50') 1 Goals: Maddie Studdon 1/1 (51')

ANZ Stadium
Attendance: 36,785
Karyn Murphy Medallist: Annette Brander (Brisbane)
Referee: Kasey Badger, Daniel Schwass

Team lists:

FB	18	Tamika Upton
WG	2	Julia Robinson
CE	3	Amy Turner
CE	4	Amber Pilley
WG	5	Meg Ward
FE	6	Raecene McGregor
HB	7	Ali Brigginshaw (c)
PR	8	Millie Boyle
HK	9	Lavinia Gould
PR	10	Amber Hall
SR	11	Annette Brander
SR	12	Tazmin Gray
LK	13	Rona Peters
Substitutes:
IC	14	Tarryn Aiken
IC	15	Steph Hancock
IC	16	Mariah Storch
IC	17	Chelsea Lenarduzzi
Coach: Kelvin Wright

FB	1	Botille Vette-Welsh
WG	2	Rikeya Horne
CE	3	Jessica Sergis
CE	4	Tiana Penitani
WG	5	Shakiah Tungai
FE	6	Keeley Davis
HB	7	Maddie Studdon
PR	8	Ngatokotoru Arakua
HK	9	Brittany Breayley
PR	10	Maitua Feterika
SR	11	Kezie Apps (c)
SR	12	Shaylee Bent
LK	13	Holli Wheeler
Substitutes:
IC	14	Aaliyah Fasavalu-Fa'amausili
IC	15	Takilele Katoa
IC	16	Maddison Weatherall
IC	17	Najvada George
Coach: Daniel Lacey
