= 2025 Women's State of Origin =

Rugby league series

- Won by: New South Wales
- Series margin: 2–1
- Points scored: 108
- Attendance: 63,960 (ave. 21,320 per match)
- Player of the series: Olivia Kernick (Nellie Doherty Medal)
- Top points scorer(s): Jayme Fressard; Jesse Southwell; (16 points each)
- Top try scorer(s): Jayme Fressard (4)

The 2025 Women's State of Origin Series was the eighth official Women's State of Origin rugby league series between New South Wales and Queensland. It was the second time in Women's State of Origin history that it was played as a three-game series and the fourth time of the eight official series to be won by New South Wales. The first game was played at Suncorp Stadium in Brisbane on 1 May 2025. The second game was on 15 May at Allianz Stadium, Sydney, and the third game was played in Newcastle at McDonald Jones Stadium on 29 May 2025. The teams have played each other annually since 1999 with the 2018 match being the first under the State of Origin banner.

== Game 1 ==
Thursday, 1 May 2025
19:45 AEST

Queensland	12–32	New South Wales
Tries: 2 Sienna Lofipo 7'; Rory Owen 24'; Goals: 2 Lauren Brown 2/2 8', 25'	1st: 12–14; 2nd: 0–18; Highlights; Match stats (NRL)	Tries: 6 Jessica Sergis 4'; Isabelle Kelly 14'; Jayme Fressard 19', 40'; Ellie Johnston 50'; Abbi Church 64'; Goals: 4 Jesse Southwell 4/7 5', 52', pen 56', 65'

Suncorp Stadium, Brisbane
Attendance: 26,022
Referee: Belinda Sharpe
Player of the Match: Isabelle Kelly

== Game 2 ==
Thursday, 15 May 2025
19:45 AEST

New South Wales	26–6	Queensland
Tries: 5 Simaima Taufa 16'; Olivia Kernick 29', 61'; Jayme Fressard 38'; Jaime Chapman 45'; Goals: 3 Jesse Southwell 3/5 18', 30', 62'	1st: 12–6; 2nd: 14–0; Highlights; Match stats (NRL)	Tries: 1 Tamika Upton 5'; Goals: 1 Lauren Brown 6'

Allianz Stadium, Sydney
Attendance: 16,026
Referee: Belinda Sharpe
Player of the Match: Olivia Kernick

== Game 3 ==
Thursday, 29 May 2025
19:45 AEST

New South Wales	14–18	Queensland
Tries: 3 Jessica Sergis 20'; Jayme Fressard 30'; Jocelyn Kelleher 48'; Goals: 1 Jesse Southwell 49'	1st: 8–6; 2nd: 6–12; Highlights; Match stats (NRL)	Tries: 3 Makenzie Weale 7'; Romy Teitzel 53'; Chelsea Lenarduzzi 64'; Goals: 3 Lauren Brown 8', 55', 65'

McDonald Jones Stadium, Newcastle
Attendance: 21,912
Referee: Belinda Sharpe
Player of the Match: Jessika Elliston

== Teams ==
=== New South Wales Sky Blues ===
Position	Game 1	Game 2	Game 3
Fullback	PAR: Abbi Church		
Wing	GCT: Jaime Chapman		
Centre	SYD: Jessica Sergis		
Centre	SYD: Isabelle Kelly (c)		
Wing	SYD: Jayme Fressard		
Five-eighth	CRO: Tiana Penitani		
Halfback	NEW: Jesse Southwell		
Prop	CAN: Simaima Taufa		
Hooker	SYD: Keeley Davis		
Prop	CRO: Ellie Johnston		
Second row	WTI: Kezie Apps		
Second row	NEW: Yasmin Clydsdale		
Lock	SYD: Olivia Kernick		
Interchange	SYD: Jocelyn Kelleher		
Interchange	PAR: Kennedy Cherrington		
Interchange	WTI: Sarah Togatuki		
Interchange	CRO: Emma Verran		
Replacement	GCT: Shaylee Bent		NEW: Olivia Higgins
Reserve	NQL: Kirra Dibb	NEW: Olivia Higgins	GCT: Shaylee Bent
Reserve	NEW: Olivia Higgins	SYD: Brydie Parker	
Coach	John Strange		

=== Queensland Maroons ===
Position	Game 1	Game 2	Game 3
Fullback	BRI: Tamika Upton		BRI: Hayley Maddick
Wing	BRI: Julia Robinson		
Centre	BRI: Shenae Ciesiolka		
Centre	PAR: Rory Owen		WTI: Emily Bass
Wing	NQL: Jasmine Peters		
Five-eighth	SYD: Tarryn Aiken		
Halfback	BRI: Ali Brigginshaw		GCT: Lauren Brown
Prop	BRI: Keilee Joseph	NQL: Makenzie Weale	
Hooker	GCT: Lauren Brown		BRI: Destiny Brill
Prop	GCT: Jessika Elliston		
Second row	GCT: Sienna Lofipo		
Second row	BRI: Romy Teitzel		
Lock	BRI: Destiny Brill	BRI: Keilee Joseph	BRI: Chelsea Lenarduzzi
Interchange	BRI: Jada Ferguson		BRI: Ali Brigginshaw
Interchange	CAN: Sophie Holyman		CRO: Georgia Hannaway
Interchange	NQL: Makenzie Weale	BRI: Chelsea Lenarduzzi	CAN: Sophie Holyman
Interchange	SYD: Tavarna Papalii		
Replacement	CRO: Georgia Hannaway	BRI: Hayley Maddick	BRI: Jada Ferguson
Reserve	BRI: Chelsea Lenarduzzi	CRO: Georgia Hannaway	
Reserve	BRI: Hayley Maddick	BRI: Destiny Brill	
Coach	Tahnee Norris		

== Under-19s ==
Thursday, 19 June 2025
17:45 AEST

Queensland	10–26	New South Wales
Tries: 2 Reegan Hicks 14'; Jennifer Kimber 33'; Goals: 1 Ella-Jaye Harrison-Leaunoa 15'	1st: 6–16; 2nd: 4–10; Highlights; Match Stats (NRL)	Tries: 5 Bronte Wilson 20'; Evie McGrath 23'; Tyra Ekepati 26'; Kasey Reh 47'; Maria Paseka 50'; Goals: 3 Logan Fletcher 21', 27', 48'

Sunshine Coast Stadium, Sunshine Coast
Player of the Match: Kasey Reh

=== Teams ===
Queensland	Position	New South Wales
BRT: Fleur Ginn	Fullback	Logan Fletcher: SYD
IPS: Pauline To'o	Wing	Liesl Hopoate: Ill
TWE: Phoenix-Raine Hippi	Centre	Indie Bostock: Ill
NEW: Mariah Brown	Centre	Tyra Ekepati: SYD
MAC: Jennifer Kimber	Wing	Maria Paseka: Ill
IPS: Ella-Jaye Harrison-Leaunoa	Five-Eighth	Evie McGrath: WTI
MAC: Caitlin Tanner	Halfback	Kasey Rah (c): Ill
SLM: Harlem Walker	Prop	Ella Walker: WTI
BUR: Nadia Windleborn (c)	Hooker	Tori Shipton: Ill
RED: Reegan Hicks	Prop	Tess McWilliams: PAR
RED: Deleni Paitai	2nd Row	Fontayne Tufuga: PAR
SUN: Takoda Thompson	2nd Row	Evah McEwen: NEW
SLM: Amanii Misa	Lock	Ryvrr-Lee Alo: PAR
SUN: Lila Parr	Interchange	Ava Jones: PAR
CBY: Mackenzie Stephens	Interchange	Bronte Wilson: Ill
SLM: Keira Rangi	Interchange	Siulolo Richter: Ill
IPS: Shalom Sauaso	Interchange	Khyliah Gray: PAR
IPS: Mercedez Taulelei-Siala	Reserve	Tahlia O'Brien: Ill
Maia Tua-Davidson	Coach	Courtney Crawford

Notes:

- Squad lists:

== See also ==
- 2025 NRL season
- 2025 NRL Women's season
- 2025 State of Origin series
