= 2022 Women's State of Origin =

New South Wales	Queensland
20	14
1	2	Total
14	10	20
6	4	14
- Date: 24 June 2022
- Stadium: GIO Stadium
- Location: Canberra, ACT, Australia
- Nellie Doherty Medal: Isabelle Kelly
- Referee: Belinda Sharpe
- Attendance: 11,321

Broadcast partners
- Broadcasters: Nine Network (Live) Fox League (Live) Kayo Sports (Live)

The 2022 Women's State of Origin was the fifth official Women's State of Origin rugby league match between the New South Wales and Queensland. It was played at Canberra's GIO Stadium on 24 June 2022. The teams have played each other annually since 1999 with the 2022 game being the fifth played under the State of Origin banner.

== Background ==
On 9 March 2022, the NRL, alongside the Canberra Raiders and ACT government, announced that Canberra's GIO Stadium would host the Women's State of Origin for the first time. The under-19 fixture, which had been held before the senior game in prior years, was played the day before on June 23 at Leichhardt Oval.

== Match summary ==
24 June 2022
7:45 pm (AEST)

New South Wales	20 – 14	Queensland
Tries: 3 Emma Tonegato 13'; Kirra Dibb 15'; Isabelle Kelly 67'; Goals: 4 Rachael Pearson (4/5) 14', 17', pen 27', pen 41'	1st: 14–10; 2nd: 6–4; Highlights; Match stats (NRL); Report	Tries: 3 Destiny Brill 8'; Tarryn Aiken 21'; Evania Pelite 56'; Goals: 1 Ali Brigginshaw (1/2) 22'

GIO Stadium
Attendance: 11,321
Nellie Doherty Medal: Isabelle Kelly
Referee: Belinda Sharpe

== Teams ==
New South Wales	Position	Queensland
SGI: Emma Tonegato	Fullback	Tamika Upton: NEW
NEW: Yasmin Clydsdale	Wing	Emily Bass: BRI
SYD: Jessica Sergis	Centre	Evania Pelite: GCT
SYD: Isabelle Kelly	Centre	Shenae Ciesiolka: BRI
PAR: Tiana Penitani	Wing	Julia Robinson: BRI
NEW: Kirra Dibb	Five-Eighth	Tarryn Aiken: BRI
SGI: Rachael Pearson	Halfback	Ali Brigginshaw (c): BRI
PAR: Simaima Taufa	Prop	Chelsea Lenarduzzi: BRI
SGI: Keeley Davis	Hooker	Brittany Breayley-Nati: GCT
NEW: Millie Boyle	Prop	Shannon Mato: GCT
SGI: Kezie Apps (c)	2nd Row	Tallisha Harden: BRI
SGI: Shaylee Bent	2nd Row	Tazmin Gray: GCT
NEW: Hannah Southwell	Lock	Destiny Brill: GCT
SGI: Quincy Dodd	Interchange	Lauren Brown: GCT
SYD: Sarah Togatuki	Interchange	Jessika Elliston: GCT
NEW: Caitlan Johnston	Interchange	Steph Hancock: GCT
SYD: Olivia Kernick	Interchange	Tiana Raftstrand-Smith: GCT
Kylie Hilder	Coach	Tahnee Norris

== Under-19s ==
The Under-19 Women's State of Origin was played the day before the senior Women's State of Origin match as a curtain raiser for the under-19 men's game.

=== Match summary ===
23 June 2022
5:45 pm (AEDT)

New South Wales	22 – 6	Queensland
Tries: 5 Andie Robinson 4', 39', 46'; Jada Taylor 20', 53'; Goals: 1 Rueben Cherrington 40'	1st: 8–6; 2nd: 14–0; Match stats (NRL); Report	Tries: 1 Jada Ferguson 14'; Goals: 1 Chantay Kiria-Ratu 15'

Leichhardt Oval
Referee: Karra-Lee Nolan
Player of the Match: Jada Taylor (NSW)

=== Teams ===
New South Wales	Position	Queensland
SIA: Jada Taylor	Fullback	Chantay Kiria-Ratu: TWE
PAR: Petesa Lio	Wing	Jetaya Faifua: TWE
CRO: Andie Robinson	Centre	Emmanita Paki: CQC
NEW: Mia Middleton	Centre	Felila Kia: WYN
STG: Cassey Tohi-Hiku	Wing	Helen Uitualagi: WYN
WTI: Losana Lutu	Five-Eighth	Jada Ferguson: TWE
SIA: Tayla Montgomery (c)	Halfback	Jayde Herdegen: WYN
CBY: Monalisa Soliola	Prop	April Ngatupuna: NQG
CRO: Rueben Cherrington	Hooker	Lily-Rose Kolc: BUR
PAR: Ruby-Jean Kennard	Prop	Fiona Jahnke: WBP
SIA: Leilani Wilson	2nd Row	Otesa Pule: CCR
STG: Chantel Tugaga	2nd Row	Hannah Larsson (c): WBP
SIA: Iesha Duckett	Lock	Georgina Tuitaalili: RED
SIA: Anneka Wilson	Interchange	Jasmine Peters: NQG
Ill: Tiana Kore	Interchange	Montana Mook: NOR
PAR: Tahleisha Maeva	Interchange	Lavinia Kitai: BRT
NEW: Jules Kirkpatrick	Interchange	Jacinta Carter: WYN
Blake Cavallaro	Coach	Ben Jeffries
