= 2019 NRL Women's season =

2019 NRL Women's Premiership
- Duration: 14 September to 6 October 2019
- Teams: 4
- Premiers: Brisbane Broncos (2nd title)
- Minor premiers: Brisbane Broncos (2nd title)
- Matches played: 7
- Points scored: 192
- Top points scorer(s): Maddie Studdon (16)
- Biggest away win: Dragons 26 — 6 Warriors at Mt Smart Stadium, Auckland; Round 2 (22 September 2019)
- Dally M Award: Jessica Sergis
- Top try-scorer(s): Jessica Sergis (3)

The 2019 NRL Women's Premiership was the second season of professional women's rugby league in Australia.

== Teams ==
Club	Season	Head coach	Captain(s)	Ref
Brisbane Broncos	2nd season	Kelvin Wright	Ali Brigginshaw (4)	
New Zealand Warriors	2nd season	Luisa Avaiki	Georgia Hale (3)	
St. George Illawarra Dragons	2nd season	Daniel Lacey	Kezie Apps (4)	
Sydney Roosters	2nd season	Rick Stone	Simaima Taufa (2) also Isabelle Kelly (1: Round 3)	

Notes:

- In the Captain(s) column
  - The number next to the name indicates the number of games played as captain
  - The word also indicates the player deputised as captain when the regular captain missed one or more matches.

== Pre-season ==
Home	Score	Away	Match Information
Home	Score	Away	Date and Time (Local)	Venue	Referees	Crowd
Brisbane Broncos	14–0	Papua New Guinea Orchids	31 August 2019, 4:00pm	PNG Football Stadium

== Regular season ==
The season again operated under a round-robin format, with games played as curtain-raisers to the 2019 NRL Finals Series as well as two standalone matches. The top two finishing teams will then contest the Grand Final, which is to be played before the men's Grand Final on 6 October.

== Ladder ==
2019 NRL Women's season
Pos	Team	Pld	W	D	L	PF	PA	PD	Pts
1	Brisbane Broncos	3	2	0	1	42	14	+28	4
2	St. George Illawarra Dragons	3	2	0	1	54	36	+18	4
3	New Zealand Warriors	3	2	0	1	32	46	−14	4
4	Sydney Roosters	3	0	0	3	28	60	−32	0

=== Ladder progression ===
- Numbers highlighted in green indicate that the team finished the round inside the top two.
- Numbers highlighted in blue indicates the team finished first on the ladder in that round.
- Numbers highlighted in red indicates the team finished last place on the ladder in that round.

	Team	1	2	3
1	Brisbane Broncos	2	4	4
2	St. George Illawarra Dragons	0	2	4
3	New Zealand Warriors	2	2	4
4	Sydney Roosters	0	0	0

== Grand Final ==
Sunday, 6 October
4:05pm

Brisbane Broncos	30 – 6	St. George Illawarra Dragons
Tries: Lavinia Gould (3') 1 Raecene McGregor (15') 1 Julia Robinson (39') 1 Chelsea Lenarduzzi (41') 1 Amber Pilley (48') 1 Goals: Meg Ward 5/6 (17', 32', 40', 42', 49')	1st: 10 – 0; 2nd: 20 – 6 Highlights; Replay; Reports	Tries: Kezie Apps (50') 1 Goals: Maddie Studdon 1/1 (51')

ANZ Stadium
Attendance: 36,785
Karyn Murphy Medallist: Annette Brander (Brisbane)
Referee: Kasey Badger, Daniel Schwass

Team lists:

FB	18	Tamika Upton
WG	2	Julia Robinson
CE	3	Amy Turner
CE	4	Amber Pilley
WG	5	Meg Ward
FE	6	Raecene McGregor
HB	7	Ali Brigginshaw (c)
PR	8	Millie Boyle
HK	9	Lavinia Gould
PR	10	Amber Hall
SR	11	Annette Brander
SR	12	Tazmin Gray
LK	13	Rona Peters
Substitutes:
IC	14	Tarryn Aiken
IC	15	Steph Hancock
IC	16	Mariah Storch
IC	17	Chelsea Lenarduzzi
Coach: Kelvin Wright

FB	1	Botille Vette-Welsh
WG	2	Rikeya Horne
CE	3	Jessica Sergis
CE	4	Tiana Penitani
WG	5	Shakiah Tungai
FE	6	Keeley Davis
HB	7	Maddie Studdon
PR	8	Ngatokotoru Arakua
HK	9	Brittany Breayley
PR	10	Maitua Feterika
SR	11	Kezie Apps (c)
SR	12	Shaylee Bent
LK	13	Holli Wheeler
Substitutes:
IC	14	Aaliyah Fasavalu-Fa'amausili
IC	15	Takilele Katoa
IC	16	Maddison Weatherall
IC	17	Najvada George
Coach: Daniel Lacey

== Individual awards ==
=== Dally M Medal Awards Night ===
The following award was presented at the Dally M Medal Awards ceremony in Sydney on the night of 2 October 2019.

Dally M Medal Player of the Year: Jessica Sergis ( St. George Illawarra Dragons)

=== Grand Final Day Awards ===
The following awards were presented at ANZ Stadium on Grand Final day, 6 October 2019.

Veronica White Medal: Honey Hireme ( New Zealand Warriors).

Karyn Murphy Medal Player of the Match: Annette Brander ( Brisbane Broncos)

=== Statistical Awards ===
Highest Point Scorer in Regular Season: Maddie Studdon ( St. George Illawarra Dragons) 14 (7g)

Top Try Scorers in Regular Season: Jessica Sergis ( St. George Illawarra Dragons) 3

Highest Point Scorer across the Full Season: Maddie Studdon ( St. George Illawarra Dragons) 16 (8g)

Top Try Scorer across the Full Season: Jessica Sergis ( St. George Illawarra Dragons) 3

== Postseason ==
In October 2018, NRL announced the inaugural edition of Rugby League World Cup 9s in Western Sydney on 18–19 October 2019, featuring 12 international men's teams and 4 women's teams. This would be around one month after the Women's Grand Final and replaced the Auckland Nines which had been run as a preseason tournament in previous years.
