= 2020 Women's State of Origin =

Queensland	New South Wales
24	18
	1	2	Total
QLD	6	18	24
NSW	6	12	18
- Date: 13 November 2020
- Stadium: Sunshine Coast Stadium
- Location: Sunshine Coast, Queensland, Australia
- Nellie Doherty Medal: Tarryn Aiken
- Referee: Belinda Sharpe
- Attendance: 4,833

Broadcast partners
- Broadcasters: Nine Network (Live) Fox League (Live)

The 2020 Women's State of Origin was the third official Women's State of Origin rugby league match between the New South Wales and Queensland played at Sunshine Coast Stadium on 13 November 2020. The teams have played each other annually since 1999 with the 2020 game being the third played under the State of Origin banner.

Queensland defeated New South Wales 24–18, winning their first State of Origin game and winning their first game since 2014. Queensland five-eighth Tarryn Aiken was awarded the Nellie Doherty Medal for Player of the Match.

== Background ==
The 2020 Women's State of Origin game was originally due to be played in June but, due to the COVID-19 pandemic, was moved to the post-season for the first time. The game was played in Queensland for the first time under the State of Origin banner and for the first time overall since 2016. Unlike in 2019, a women's under-18 Origin game was not held as the curtain-raiser.

== Match summary ==
Friday, 13 November
7:45 pm (AEDT)

Queensland	24 – 18	New South Wales
Tries: 4 Tamika Upton 14', 43'; Tarryn Aiken 51'; Steph Hancock 57'; Goals: 4 Lauren Brown (4/4) 15', 44', 52', 58'	1st: 6–6; 2nd: 18–12; Highlights; Match Stats (NRL); Report	Tries: 4 Kezie Apps 24'; Tiana Penitani 59'; Filomina Hanisi 67'; Botille Vette-Welsh 69'; Goals: 1 Melanie Howard (1/1) 26'

Sunshine Coast Stadium
Attendance: 4,833
Nellie Doherty Medal: Tarryn Aiken
Referee: Belinda Sharpe

== Teams ==
Queensland	Position	New South Wales
Tamika Upton	Fullback	Botille Vette-Welsh
Shenae Ciesiolka	Wing	Jessica Sergis
Julia Robinson	Centre	Tiana Penitani
Lauren Brown	Centre	Isabelle Kelly
Karina Brown	Wing	Shanice Parker
Tarryn Aiken	Five-Eighth	Corban McGregor
Zahara Temara	Halfback	Melanie Howard
Chelsea Lenarduzzi	Prop	Simaima Taufa
Brittany Breayley	Hooker	Kylie Hilder
Rona Peters	Prop	Millie Boyle
Tallisha Harden	2nd Row	Kezie Apps (c)
Tazmin Gray	2nd Row	Shaylee Bent
Ali Brigginshaw (c)	Lock	Hannah Southwell
Steph Hancock	Interchange	Quincy Dodd
Annette Brander	Interchange	Filomina Hanisi
Shannon Mato	Interchange	Sarah Togatuki
Shaniah Power	Interchange	Yasmin Meakes
Jason Hetherington	Coach	Andy Patmore
