= Amy Turner (rugby, born March 1984) =

New Zealand rugby league & union player

Personal information
- Full name: Amy Justine Turner
- Born: 25 March 1984 (age 42) Tokoroa, New Zealand

Playing information
- Height: 165 cm (5 ft 5 in)
- Weight: 65 kg (10 st 3 lb)

Rugby league
- Position: Centre
Club
| Years | Team | Pld | T | G | FG | P |
|---|---|---|---|---|---|---|
| 2019–22 | Brisbane Broncos | 5 | 1 | 0 | 0 | 4 |
Representative
| Years | Team | Pld | T | G | FG | P |
| 2019 | Queensland | 1 | 0 | 0 | 0 | 0 |
| 2003–21 | Māori All Stars | 2 | 2 | 0 | 0 | 8 |

Rugby union
- Position: Back
Club
| Years | Team | Pld | T | G | FG | P |
|---|---|---|---|---|---|---|
| 2019 | Queensland Reds | 4 | 1 | 0 | 0 | 5 |
Representative
| Years | Team | Pld | T | G | FG | P |
| 2013–16 | Australia 7s |
- Source: RLP
Medals
Women's rugby sevens
Representing Australia
Olympic Games
| Gold medal – first place | 2016 Rio de Janeiro | Team competition |

Amy Justine Turner OAM (born 25 March 1984) is an Australian rugby union and rugby league player.

In rugby sevens, she represented Australia, winning a gold medal at the 2016 Summer Olympics in Rio de Janeiro. In rugby league, she played for the Brisbane Broncos, winning an NRL Women's Premiership, and representing Queensland.

== Background ==
Born in Tokoroa, New Zealand, Turner is of Māori descent, and affiliates to the Tainui iwi (tribe). Growing up in Tokoroa, she played rugby league.

== Playing career ==
When she was six she began playing rugby league and as her childhood progressed also began playing touch rugby and rugby union.

She went on to play for the New Zealand Touch Football team.

=== Rugby union ===
Turner was introduced by Honey Hireme to the Aotearoa Māori sevens team and played for them in 2004 when they won the Whangarei sevens tournament and the Hong Kong sevens tournament.

When she was 20 Turner moved from Tokoroa to Queensland, where she settled in Brisbane. Three years later she briefly moved back to New Zealand before returning to Queensland where she obtained employment driving trucks on the night shift at the mines at Mt Isa.

Playing as a utility, Turner earned her first call up to the Australian Women's Sevens for the Houston leg of the 2012–13 IRB Women's Sevens World Series.

Initially Turner would fly from Queensland to Sydney a week or so before a tournament to train with the squad before returning home where she would train alone. Turner was a member of the squad that won the Dubai and São Paulo legs in the 2013–14 IRB Women's Sevens World Series. Two years prior to the 2016 Rio Olympics, Turner gave up her job in the mines and took a massive drop in income down to 25% of what she had been earning when she moved to Sydney to concentrate on playing sevens and making the Olympics. Turner played a pivotal role as Australia won the London leg of the World Series in May 2015. Turner also scored a try in the 2014 World Cup.

She was a member of Australia's team at the 2016 Olympics, defeating New Zealand in the final to win the inaugural Olympic gold medal in the sport. As a result she became the first Māori to win Olympic gold in sevens rugby.

=== Rugby league ===
In 2019, Turner returned to rugby league, playing for the Wests Panthers. In May 2019, she represented South East Queensland at the Women's National Championships. On 21 June 2019, she made her State of Origin debut for Queensland, coming off the bench in a 4–14 loss to New South Wales.

On 4 July 2019, she signed with the Brisbane Broncos NRL Women's Premiership team. In Round 1 of the 2019 NRL Women's season, she made her debut for the Broncos in a 14–4 win over the St George Illawarra Dragons. On 6 October 2019, she started at centre in the Broncos' 30–6 Grand Final win over the Dragons.

In 2020, Turner missed the entire season due the birth of her second child.

On 8 October 2003 she made a try scoring debut for NZ Māori in the 46-0 win over Cook Islands in North Harbour Stadium, Auckland.

On 20 February 2021, Turner again represented the Māori All Stars, scoring a try in their 24–0 win over the Indigenous All Stars.

== See also ==
- List of players who have converted from one football code to another
