= Romy Teitzel =

Australian rugby league footballer (born 1999)

Personal information
- Born: 23 February 1999 (age 27) Townsville, Queensland, Australia
- Height: 176 cm (5 ft 9 in)
- Weight: 72 kg (11 st 5 lb)

Playing information
- Position: Second-row, Fullback, Centre
Club
Years	Team	Pld	T	G	FG	P
2020	Brisbane Broncos	1	0	0	0	0
2021–22	Newcastle Knights	12	5	0	0	20
2023–	Brisbane Broncos	46	12	76	0	200
	Total	59	17	76	0	220
Representative
Years	Team	Pld	T	G	FG	P
2023–26	Queensland	11	1	1	0	6
- Source: RLP As of 1 November 2026
- Father: Craig Teitzel

Romy Teitzel (born 23 February 1999) is an Australian rugby league footballer who plays for the Brisbane Broncos in the NRL Women's Premiership. She previously played for the Newcastle Knights in the NRL Women's Premiership, with whom she won the 2022 NRLW Grand Final, and the North Queensland Gold Stars in the QRL Women's Premiership. Her positions are second-row, fullback and centre.

== Background ==
Teitzel was born in Townsville, Queensland and played her junior rugby league for the Tully Tigers. Her father, Craig, played first grade for the Western Suburbs Magpies, Illawarra Steelers, Warrington Wolves and North Queensland Cowboys.

== Playing career ==
In 2019, while playing for the Western Lions, Teitzel represented Queensland Country at the Women's National Championships.

In March 2020, Teitzel joined the North Queensland Gold Stars for their inaugural season, playing in their first game before the season was cancelled. She later played for the Wests Panthers in the Holcim Cup.

In September 2020, she joined the Brisbane Broncos in the NRL Women's Premiership. In Round 3 of the 2020 NRL Women's season, she made her debut for the Broncos in their 24–16 win over the Sydney Roosters.

In September 2021, Teitzel was named the BHP Premiership Player of the Year.

On 3 December 2021, Teitzel signed with the Newcastle Knights to be a part of their inaugural NRLW squad. In February 2022, she was announced as the on-field captain.

In round 1 of the delayed 2021 NRL Women's season, Teitzel made her club debut for the Knights against the Parramatta Eels.

On 2 October 2022, Teitzel played in the Knights' 2022 NRLW Grand Final win over the Parramatta Eels, scoring a try in the Knights' 32-12 victory.

In April 2023, she re-joined the Brisbane Broncos on a 1-year contract. She played in all 10 games during the Brisbane Broncos 2023 campaign, including their 30-24 semi final loss against her former team Newcastle Knights. She played in the 2023 origin series for the Queensland, playing both games for the Maroons. The Maroons won the series on for and against after beating the New South Wales 18-10 in game 1, and losing the second game 18-14.

On 29 February 2024, It was announced that she signed a new 3-year extension with the Brisbane Broncos. In her 2024 campaign, Romy played all 9 games throughout the Brisbane Broncos regular season scoring 4 tries and kicking 24 conversions, but missed their 14-0 semi final loss to Cronulla Sharks due to a hip injury. She also played in the 2024 origin campaign for Queensland, playing all 3 games for the Maroons and kicking a conversion. Queensland won the series 2-1 after winning the last 2 games in NSW.
