= Botille Vette-Welsh =

Australia international rugby league player (born 1996)

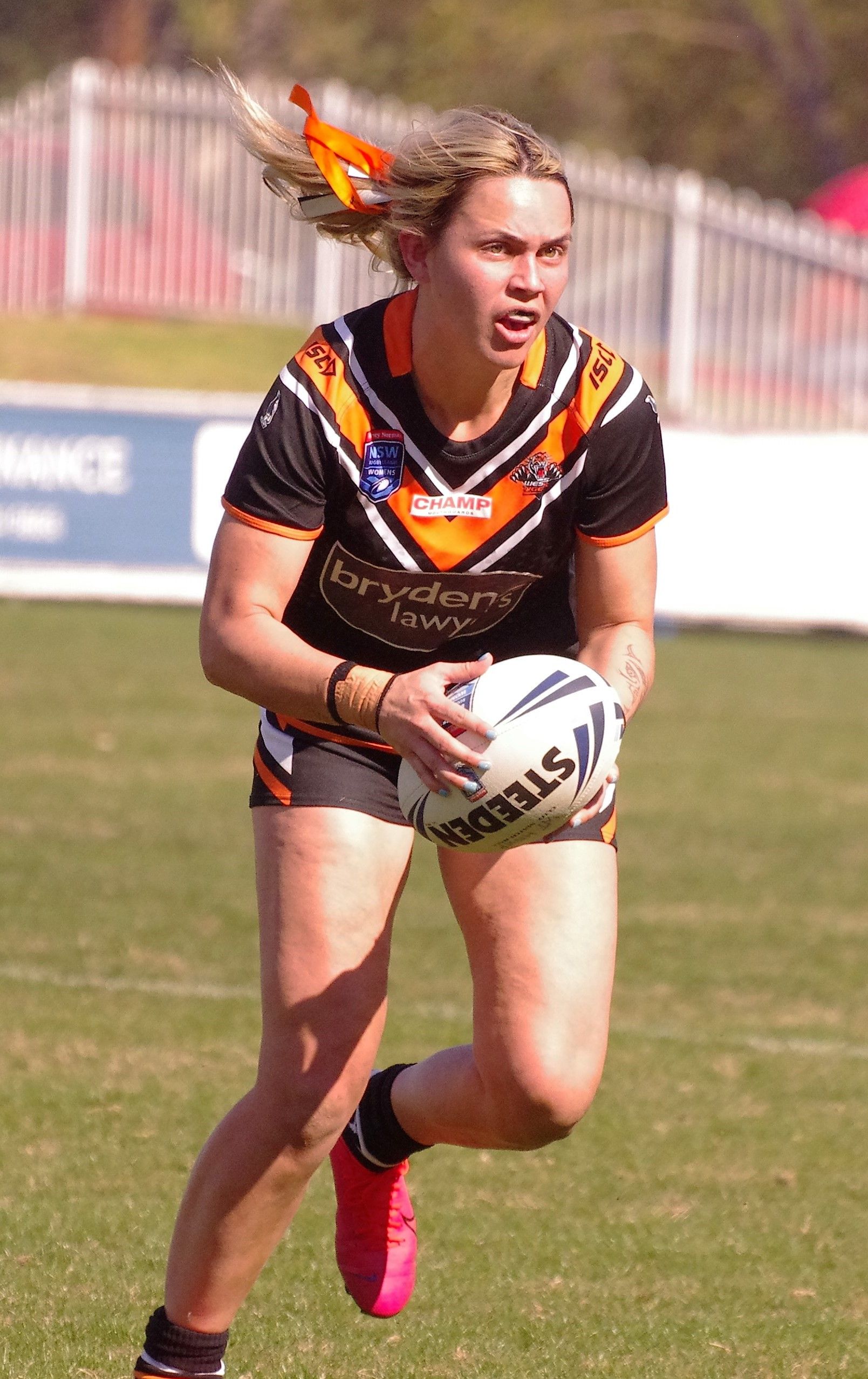
- Vette-Welsh in 2020

Personal information
- Born: 13 September 1996 (age 30) Kaitaia, New Zealand
- Height: 173 cm (5 ft 8 in)
- Weight: 66 kg (10 st 6 lb)

Playing information
- Position: Fullback
Club
| Years | Team | Pld | T | G | FG | P |
|---|---|---|---|---|---|---|
| 2018 | Sydney Roosters | 1 | 0 | 0 | 0 | 0 |
| 2019 | St. George Illawarra Dragons | 4 | 1 | 0 | 0 | 4 |
| 2020 | Sydney Roosters | 2 | 0 | 0 | 0 | 0 |
| 2021 | Parramatta Eels | 5 | 1 | 0 | 0 | 4 |
| 2023–24 | Wests Tigers | 16 | 3 | 0 | 0 | 12 |
| 2025– | Newcastle Knights | 17 | 1 | 0 | 0 | 4 |
| | Total | 45 | 6 | 0 | 0 | 24 |
Representative
| Years | Team | Pld | T | G | FG | P |
| 2019–24 | Māori All Stars | 3 | 0 | 0 | 0 | 0 |
| 2019–21 | New South Wales | 3 | 1 | 0 | 0 | 4 |
| 2019 | Australia 9s | 4 | 0 | 0 | 0 | 0 |
| 2019 | Australia | 1 | 0 | 0 | 0 | 0 |
| 2023 | Prime Minister's XIII | 1 | 0 | 0 | 0 | 0 |
- Source: As of 2 November 2026

Botille Vette-Welsh (born 13 September 1996) is a New Zealand-born Australian rugby league player who plays as a fullback for the Newcastle Knights in the NRLW.

She previously played for the St. George Illawarra Dragons, Sydney Roosters, Parramatta Eels and Wests Tigers and has represented Australia and New South Wales.

== Playing career ==
Before switching to rugby league, Vette-Welsh played rugby sevens for Macquarie University. In 2017, Vette-Welsh represented the NSW City side while playing for Cronulla-Caringbah.

=== 2018 ===
In 2018, Vette-Welsh played for Cabramatta in the NSWRL Women's Premiership and represented NSW City at the Women's National Championships.

In Round 1 of the 2018 NRL Women's Premiership, Vette-Welsh made her debut for the Sydney Roosters, starting at fullback in their 10-4 loss to the New Zealand Warriors.

=== 2019 ===
On 15 February, Vette-Welsh started at fullback for the Māori All Stars in their 8–4 win over the Indigenous All Stars. On 18 March, she joined the Wests Tigers NSWRL Women's Premiership team.

In May, she represented NSW City at the Women's National Championships.

On 14 June, she joined the St George Illawarra Dragons NRLW team. On 21 June, she made her State of Origin debut for New South Wales.

In October, she represented Australia at the 2019 Rugby League World Cup 9s. On 25 October, she made her Test debut for Australia in a 8–28 win over New Zealand.

=== 2020 ===
On 22 February, Vette-Welsh started at fullback for the Māori All Stars in their 4–10 loss to the Indigenous All Stars.

On 22 September, Vette-Welsh re-joined the Roosters NRLW team. On 25 October, she started at fullback in the Roosters' 10–20 Grand Final loss to the Brisbane Broncos.

On 13 November, she started at fullback and scored a try for New South Wales in their 18–24 State of Origin loss to Queensland.

=== 2021 ===
On 20 February, she represented the Māori All Stars in their 24–0 win over the Indigenous All Stars.

=== 2023 ===
As early as 2021, Wests Tigers Board Chairperson, Lee Hagipantelis, stated he was hoping to build the club's WNRL team around Vette-Welsh. He said, "Bo Vette-Welsh is one of those players, whether it be in the men or women's game, that draws you to watch rugby league. The way she leads that team around the park, you want to go and watch her specifically." In July 2023, she was named as co-captain, with Kezie Apps, of the Wests Tigers in their inaugural NRLW season. She said, "We're not here to be a number, we’re not here to just compete against clubs. We’re here to represent the Wests Tigers and do a good job at it. I think we have got all the capabilities in the world to win a premiership."

Vette-Welsh had missed the entirety of the 2022 season with an ACL injury and played limited minutes in the club's only pre-season trial. Six minutes into the first game, she scored the inaugural try for the NRLW team, and was said to be "enormous" as she set up another four.

=== 2024 ===
In December, Vette-Welsh signed a 3-year contract with the Newcastle Knights starting in 2025.
