= Mariah Storch =

Australian rugby league footballer

Mariah Denman
Personal information
- Born: 21 June 1997 (age 29) Barcaldine, Queensland, Australia
- Height: 170 cm (5 ft 7 in)
- Weight: 71 kg (11 st 3 lb)

Playing information
- Position: Second-row, Lock
Club
Years	Team	Pld	T	G	FG	P
2018–24	Brisbane Broncos	23	1	6	0	16
Representative
Years	Team	Pld	T	G	FG	P
2018	Queensland	1	0	0	0	0
- Source: RLP As of 23 November 2020

Mariah Denman (nee Storch, born 21 June 1997) is an Australian rugby league footballer who plays for the Central Queensland Capras in the QRL Women's Premiership and the Brisbane Broncos in the NRL Women's Premiership.

Primarily a second-rower, she is a Queensland representative and previously played in two grand final wins for the Brisbane Broncos.

== Background ==
Born in Barcaldine, Queensland in the central west, Denman moved 385 kilometres east to the mining town of Blackwater after her parents obtained work in the local coal industry. Denman attended school in Blackwater. After graduating from high school, she became an apprentice diesel mechanic.

She began playing rugby league with the newly formed Blackwater Crushettes in 2015. In 2016, she was named as Blackwater's Player of the Year. Storch subsequently began playing for the Central Queensland Capras, coached by Alan McIndoe before Adrian Vowles selected her as a wildcard for the emerging Queensland women's side.

In 2020, Central Highlands Regional Council recognised Denman as Senior Sportsperson/Administrator of the Year for the Blackwater/Duaringa district at the local Australia Day awards.

== Playing career ==
=== 2018 ===
In June, Denman represented Queensland Country at the Women's National Championships. On 22 June, she made her debut for Queensland, coming off the bench in their 10–16 State of Origin loss to New South Wales.

On July, Denman joined the Brisbane Broncos NRL Women's Premiership team. In Round 1 of the 2018 NRL Women's season, she made her debut for the Broncos, coming off the bench in a 30–4 win over the St. George Illawarra Dragons.

On 30 September, Denman came off the bench in the Broncos' Grand Final win over the Sydney Roosters.

=== 2019 ===
In May, Denman represented Queensland Country at the Women's National Championships. On 6 October, Denman won her second NRLW premiership, coming off the bench in the Broncos' 30–6 Grand Final win over the Dragons.

=== 2020 ===
In 2020, Denman joined the Central Queensland Capras for the inaugural season of the QRL Women's Premiership. She later missed the 2020 NRL Women's season due to pregnancy.

=== 2021 ===
Less than two months after giving birth to her first child, Denman returned to the QRL Women's Premiership competition for the Capras, playing six games during the season.

=== 2022 ===
After playing nine QRL Women's games for the Capras in 2022, Denman was named the Steph Hancock BMD Premiership Player of the Year after helping lead the Capras to the 2022 minor premiership.

=== 2023 ===
Denman continued playing for the Capras in 2023. In May, it was announced she would be making her return to the NRLW after re-signing with the Brisbane Broncos. On her re-signing with the team, coach Scott Prince said Denman had been playing great football for a long period of time and therefore deserved to be rewarded with another chance in the NRLW.
