= Hayley Maddick =

Australian rugby league footballer (born 1999)

Personal information
- Born: 25 May 1992 (age 34) Sunshine Coast, Queensland, Australia
- Height: 173 cm (5 ft 8 in)
- Weight: 56 kg (8 st 11 lb)

Playing information
- Position: Fullback, Wing
Club
Years	Team	Pld	T	G	FG	P
2021–25	Brisbane Broncos	42	14	0	0	56
Representative
Years	Team	Pld	T	G	FG	P
2025–	Queensland	1	0	0	0	0
- Source: RLP As of 1 November 2026

Hayley Maddick (born 25 May 1992) is an Australian rugby league footballer who last played as a fullback for the Brisbane Broncos in the NRL Women's Premiership.

== Background ==
Born on the Sunshine Coast, Queensland, Maddick played touch football for Caboolture and later the Brisbane Broncos NRL Touch Premiership side before switching to rugby league. In 2019, she was named the competition's Player of the Year.

== Playing career ==
In 2020, Maddick played for the Brisbane Broncos at the NRL Nines in Perth. Later that year, she played for the Souths Logan Magpies in the Holcim Cup.

In 2021, she joined the Valleys Diehards in the QRL Women's Premiership. In August 2021, she signed with the Broncos for the 2021 NRL Women's Premiership season, which was later postponed.

In Round 2 of the 2021 NRL Women's season, Maddick made her debut for the Broncos in a win over the Newcastle Knights.
