= Amber Hall (rugby league) =

New Zealand & Samoa international rugby league footballer

Personal information
- Full name: Amber-Paris Hall
- Born: 7 January 1995 (age 31) Auckland, New Zealand
- Height: 171 cm (5 ft 7 in)
- Weight: 108 kg (17 st 0 lb)

Playing information
- Position: Second-row, Prop
Club
Years	Team	Pld	T	G	FG	P
2019–22	Brisbane Broncos	18	4	0	0	16
2023–	Sydney Roosters	22	9	0	0	36
	Total	40	13	0	0	52
Representative
Years	Team	Pld	T	G	FG	P
2013–25	New Zealand	10	4	0	0	16
2026	Samoa	1	1	0	0	4
- Source: RLP As of 23 October 2026

Amber-Paris Hall (born 7 January 1995) is a New Zealand rugby league footballer who plays for the Sydney Roosters in the NRL Women's Premiership.

Primarily a prop, she is a New Zealand and Samoa representative.

== Playing career ==
In 2012, Hall, a Richmond Roses player, was named in New Zealand's 2012 training squad, although no games were played that season. In 2013, she made her debut for New Zealand at the 2013 Women's Rugby League World Cup, playing two games.

On 10 August 2018, Hall represented Auckland in a trial game against the New Zealand Warriors NRL Women's Premiership team.

=== 2019 ===
On 11 June, she signed with the Brisbane Broncos NRLW team. On 22 June, after a six-year absence, Hall started at prop for New Zealand in their 46–8 win over Samoa.

In Round 1 of the 2019 NRL Women's season, Hall made her debut for the Broncos, scoring a try in a 14–4 win over the St George Illawarra Dragons. On 6 October, she started at prop in the Broncos' 30–6 Grand Final win over the Dragons.

On 25 October, Hall started at prop for New Zealand in their 8–28 loss to Australia.

=== 2020 ===
In Round 2 of the 2020 NRL Women's season, she was charged with Grade 1 dangerous contact on Dragons' centre Isabelle Kelly and was suspended for one game. On 25 October, she started at second-row and scored a try in the Broncos' 20–10 Grand Final win over the Sydney Roosters. She was named Player of the Match, winning the Karyn Murphy Medal.

On 27 November, at the Broncos' end of season awards, Hall won the Player of the Year, Players' Player and Best Forward awards.

=== 2022 ===
In late September, Hall was named in the Dream Team announced by the Rugby League Players Association. The team was selected by the players, who each cast one vote for each position. In October she was selected for the New Zealand squad at the delayed 2021 Women's Rugby League World Cup in England.

=== 2026 ===
She made her Samoa début, scoring a try, in the 2026 Rugby League World Cup 76-0 win over Wales on 23 October 2026.

== Achievements and accolades ==
=== Individual ===
- Karyn Murphy Medal: 2020
- Brisbane Broncos Player of the Year: 2020
- Brisbane Broncos Players' Player: 2020
- Brisbane Broncos Best Forward: 2020

=== Team ===
- 2019 NRLW Grand Final: Brisbane Broncos – Winners
- 2020 NRLW Grand Final: Brisbane Broncos – Winners
