= Annette Brander =

Australia international rugby league player (born 1993)

Personal information
- Born: 21 January 1993 (age 33) New Lambton, New South Wales, Australia
- Height: 165 cm (5 ft 5 in)
- Weight: 78 kg (12 st 4 lb)

Playing information
- Position: Second-row, Lock, Centre
Club
Years	Team	Pld	T	G	FG	P
2018	St George Illawarra	3	0	0	0	0
2019–20	Brisbane Broncos	8	1	0	0	4
2021	Gold Coast Titans	1	0	0	0	0
	Total	12	1	0	0	4
Representative
Years	Team	Pld	T	G	FG	P
2014–20	Queensland	6	0	0	0	0
2014–19	Australia	11	0	0	0	0
2014–16	Women's All Stars	3	0	0	0	0
- Source: RLP As of 3 December 2020

Annette Brander (born 12 January 1993) is an Australian rugby league footballer who plays as a second-rower for the Brisbane Broncos in the NRL Women's Premiership and the Central Queensland Capras in the QRL Women's Premiership.

She is an Australian and Queensland representative.

== Background ==
Born in New Lambton, New South Wales, Brander moved to Caboolture, Queensland with her family when she was two-years old.

== Playing career ==
In 2010, Brander began playing rugby league for the Caboolture under-18 side and the Sunshine Coast Sirens. In 2012, she joined Brisbane Women's Division 1 side, the Beerwah Bulldogs. In 2014, she made her debut for Australia in their 12-8 loss to New Zealand in Wollongong.

In October 2017, she was named in Australia's 2017 Women's Rugby League World Cup squad, playing four games in the tournament.

=== 2018 ===
In June 2018, she represented Queensland Country at the 2018 NRL Women's National Championships. In July 2018, Brander joined the St George Illawarra Dragons in the NRL Women's Premiership.

In Round 1 of the 2018 NRL Women's season, Brander made her debut for the Dragons in their 4–30 loss to the Brisbane Broncos.

=== 2019 ===
In June 2019, she again represented Queensland Country at the NRL Women's National Championships. Later that month, she signed with the Brisbane Broncos.

On 6 October 2019, she started at second-row in the Broncos' 30–6 Grand Final win over the Dragons and won the Karyn Murphy Medal for Player of the Match.

=== 2020 ===
On 25 October 2020, she came off the bench in the Broncos' 20–10 Grand Final win over the Sydney Roosters.

=== 2021 ===
In 2021, Brander joined the Central Queensland Capras in the QRL Women's Premiership.

== Achievements and accolades ==
=== Individual ===
- Karyn Murphy Medal: 2019
- QRL Representative Player of the Year: 2019

=== Team ===
- 2017 Women's Rugby League World Cup: Australia – Winners
- 2019 NRLW Grand Final: Brisbane Broncos – Winners
- 2020 NRLW Grand Final: Brisbane Broncos – Winners
