= Lauren Brown =

Australian rugby and association footballer

Personal information
- Born: 18 April 1995 (age 31) Gold Coast, Queensland, Australia
- Height: 169 cm (5 ft 7 in)
- Weight: 70 kg (11 st 0 lb)

Playing information

Rugby union
- Position: Outside back
Representative
Years	Team	Pld	T	G	FG	P
2018–20	Australia 7s	5	1

Rugby league
- Position: Hooker, Halfback
Club
Years	Team	Pld	T	G	FG	P
2020–21	Brisbane Broncos	10	1	19	0	42
2022–	Gold Coast Titans	35	5	50	3	123
	Total	45	6	69	3	165
Representative
Years	Team	Pld	T	G	FG	P
2020–26	Queensland	12	0	19	1	39
2022–23	Australia	7	0	31	0	62
2024	Prime Minister's Women's XIII	1	0	1	0	2
- Source: RLP As of 30 October 2026
Association football career
- Position: Attacking midfielder
Senior career*
Years	Team	Apps	(Gls)
2012	Brisbane Roar	2	(0)
2013–14	Newcastle Jets	9	(0)
International career
2011	Australia U-16		
- * Club domestic league appearances and goals as of 5 December 2020

Lauren Brown (born 18 April 1995) is an Australian rugby league footballer who plays as a utility for the Gold Coast Titans in the NRL Women's Premiership and the Burleigh Bears in the QRL Women's Premiership.

Before switching to rugby league, she played soccer for the Brisbane Roar and Newcastle Jets in the W-League and for Australia in rugby sevens.

== Background ==
Born on the Gold Coast, Queensland, Brown played rugby league growing up before having to give up the sport when she was 12, taking up soccer, touch football and surf lifesaving.

== Playing career ==
=== Soccer ===
In 2011, Brown represented Australia at the 2011 AFC U-16 Women's Championship, scoring one goal. In 2012, she played for the Brisbane before moving to the Newcastle Jets for the 2013–14 W-League season.

=== Rugby sevens ===
In 2017, Brown played for Griffith University at the Aon University Sevens and represented Australia at the Oceania Games.

In 2018, she played for Bond University at the Aon University Sevens. In April 2018, she made her Rugby Sevens Series debut for Australia in Japan.

=== Rugby league ===
In 2020, Brown returned to rugby league, joining the Burleigh Bears. On 5 September 2020, she started at five-eighth and was named Player of the Match in Burleigh's Holcim Cup Grand Final win over the Souths Logan Magpies.

On 23 September 2020, Brown joined the Brisbane Broncos Women NRL Women's Premiership squad. In Round 1 of the 2020 NRL Women's season, she made her debut for the Broncos in a 28–14 win over the New Zealand Warriors. On 25 October 2020, she started at hooker in the Broncos' 20–10 Grand Final win over the Sydney Roosters.

On 13 November 2020, Brown made her State of Origin debut for Queensland, starting at centre and kicking four goals in a 24–18 win over New South Wales.

On 1st of October 2023, she started at Half Back for the Gold Coast Titans Women in the Grand Final, losing to the Newcastle Knights Women 24-18

== Achievements and accolades ==
=== Team ===
- 2020 NRLW Grand Final: Brisbane Broncos – Winners

2023 NRLW Grand Final: Gold Coast Titans - Runners Up
