= Jada Ferguson =

Australian rugby league footballer (born 1999)

Personal information
- Born: 8 July 2002 (age 24) Toowoomba, Queensland, Australia
- Height: 167 cm (5 ft 6 in)
- Weight: 66 kg (10 st 6 lb)

Playing information
- Position: Five-eighth, Hooker
Club
Years	Team	Pld	T	G	FG	P
2021–	Brisbane Broncos	52	9	0	0	36
Representative
Years	Team	Pld	T	G	FG	P
2025–26	Queensland	5	1	0	0	4
- Source: RLP As of 1 November 2026
- Relatives: Shenae Ciesiolka (cousin)

Jada Ferguson (born 8 July 2002) is an Australian rugby league footballer and premiership winner who plays as a five-eighth or hooker for the Brisbane Broncos in the NRL Women's Premiership and Tweed Heads Seagulls in the QRL Women's Premiership.

== Background ==
Born in Toowoomba, Queensland, Ferguson began playing rugby league at age 11 but was forced to stop due to age restrictions, instead switching to touch football and rugby sevens. She is cousins with Brisbane Broncos teammate Shenae Ciesiolka.

== Playing career ==
In 2021, Ferguson joined the Tweed Heads Seagulls in the QRL Women's Premiership. In June 2021, she played five-eighth for Queensland Under-19 in their loss to New South Wales Under-19 at Sunshine Coast Stadium.

In December 2021, Ferguson signed with the Brisbane Broncos for the rescheduled 2021 NRL Women's Premiership season.

In Round 1 of the 2021 NRL Women's season, she made her debut for the Broncos, coming off the bench in a win over the Sydney Roosters.

On the 1st May 2025, Ferguson made her Origin debut for Queensland off the bench in the 32–12 loss to New South Wales at Suncorp Stadium, and went on to play game two at Allianz Stadium.

In 2025 Ferguson was a part of the Brisbane Broncos side that claimed their fourth premiership scoring a try in the 22-18 Grand Final win over the Sydney Roosters at Accor Stadium
