= Shenae Ciesiolka =

Australia international rugby league footballer (born 1997)

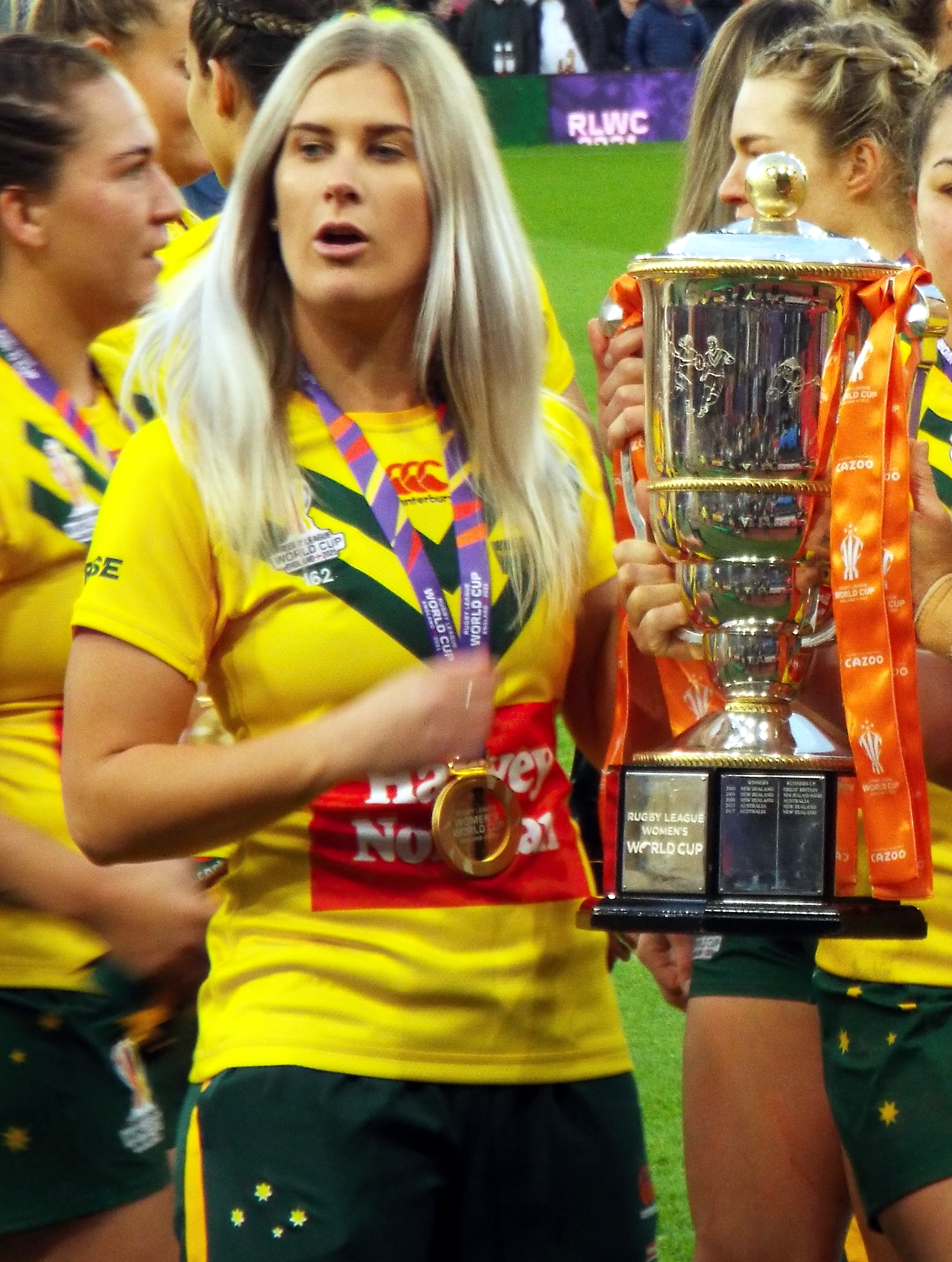

Personal information
- Born: 7 August 1997 (age 29) Toowoomba, Queensland, Australia
- Height: 171 cm (5 ft 7 in)
- Weight: 65 kg (10 st 3 lb)

Playing information

Rugby union
- Position: Outside back
Representative
Years	Team	Pld	T	G	FG	P
2015–16	Australia 7s	5	1	0	0	5

Rugby league
- Position: Wing, Centre
Club
Years	Team	Pld	T	G	FG	P
2020–25	Brisbane Broncos	39	17	0	0	68
2026–	St. George Illawarra Dragons	10	2	0	0	8
	Total	49	19	0	0	76
Representative
Years	Team	Pld	T	G	FG	P
2020–26	Queensland	12	1	0	0	4
2022–	Australia	3	4	0	0	16
- Source: As of 31 October 2026
- Relatives: Jada Ferguson (cousin)
Medals
Women's rugby sevens
Representing Australia
Youth Olympic Games
Gold medal – first place	2014 Nanjing	Team competition

Shenae Ciesiolka (born 7 August 1997) is an Australian rugby league footballer who plays as a winger or centre for the St George Illawarra Dragons in the NRL Women's Premiership and Valleys Diehards in the QRL Women's Premiership.

Prior to switching to rugby league, she represented the Australia rugby sevens team.

Ciesolka is a Queensland and Australia representative, and a two time premiership winner with the Brisbane Broncos.

== Background ==
Ciesiolka was born in Toowoomba, Queensland and played rugby league, rugby union and touch football growing up. In 2013, she represented the Australian under-18 touch team against New Zealand.

== Playing career ==
=== Rugby sevens ===
In 2014, Ciesiolka represented Australia in rugby sevens at the 2014 Summer Youth Olympics, winning a gold medal. On 3 July 2015, she signed with the Australia sevens program. In April 2016, she made her debut for Australia at the 2016 Canada Women's Sevens.

After two years in the Australian program, Ciesiolka returned to Queensland, playing for the University of Queensland at the 2018 and 2019 Aon University Sevens series.

=== Rugby league ===
==== Brisbane Broncos ====
In September 2020, Ciesiolka switched to rugby league, joining the Brisbane Broncos NRL Women's Premiership squad. In Round 2 of the 2020 NRL Women's season, she made her debut for the Broncos, coming off the bench in an 18–4 win over the St. George Illawarra Dragons. On 25 October 2020, she started on the wing in the Broncos' 20–10 Grand Final win over the Sydney Roosters.

==== Valley Diehards ====
In 2021, she joined the Valleys Diehards in the QRL Women's Premiership, starting in the centres and scoring a try in their Grand Final loss to the Burleigh Bears. On 25 June 2021, she started on the wing for Queensland in their 8–6 win over New South Wales.

==== St George Illawarra Dragons ====
On 5 March 2026 it was reported that she had signed a 4-year deal to join St. George Illawarra Dragons

==== Representative ====
On 13 November 2020, Ciesiolka made her State of Origin debut for Queensland, starting on the wing in their 24–18 win over New South Wales.

In October 2022, Ciesiolka was named in the Australia squad for the 2021 World Cup. She played three games for the Jillaroos during the tournament, scoring a try on debut against the Cook Islands also scoring in the match against France, and scoring twice in the semi-final against Papua New Guinea.

== Achievements and accolades ==
=== Team ===
- 2020 NRLW Grand Final: Brisbane Broncos – Winners
