= Tamika Upton =

Australia international rugby league footballer (born 1997)

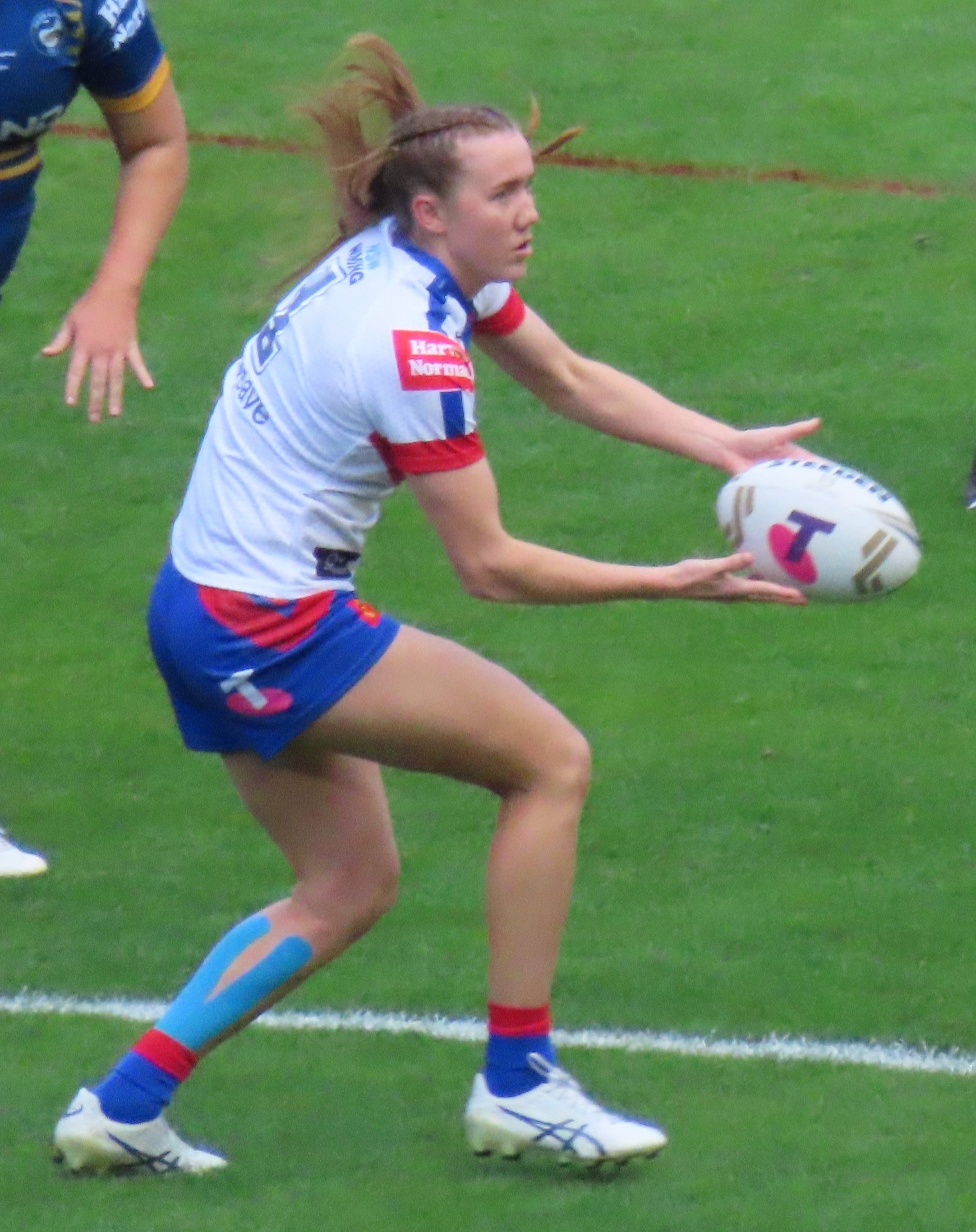
- Upton in 2022

Personal information
- Born: 17 March 1997 (age 29) Rockhampton, Queensland, Australia
- Height: 178 cm (5 ft 10 in)
- Weight: 64 kg (10 st 1 lb)

Playing information
- Position: Fullback
Club
Years	Team	Pld	T	G	FG	P
2019–21	Brisbane Broncos	11	7	0	0	28
2022–24	Newcastle Knights	26	19	0	0	76
2025–	Brisbane Broncos	27	35	0	0	140
	Total	64	61	0	0	244
Representative
Years	Team	Pld	T	G	FG	P
2020–26	Queensland	11	4	0	0	16
2022–24	Indigenous All Stars	2	0	0	0	0
2023–26	Australia	13	18	0	0	72
- Source: As of 16 November 2026

Tamika Upton (born 17 March 1997) is an Australian professional rugby league footballer who currently plays for the Brisbane Broncos in the NRL Women's Premiership. Her position is fullback. She previously played for the Newcastle Knights in the NRLW, and the CQ Capras and Burleigh Bears in the QRL Women's Premiership.

== Background ==
Born in Rockhampton, Upton grew up in Central Queensland and first started playing rugby league as a child in Blackwater. She is of Indigenous Australian (Barada) descent.

Prior to her career as a rugby league player, Upton played touch football. She represented the Australian national side, the Emus, during the 2017 Trans Tasman series. She also served as co-captain of the Queensland Cowboys during the NRL Touch competition in 2017. Upton has also played netball for local Central Queensland team, the Capricorn Claws.

== Playing career ==
In 2018, she joined the Yeppoon Seagulls' women's side, where she played in five-eighth in the Rockhampton District competition.

=== 2019 ===
On 15 July, Upton signed with the Brisbane Broncos NRL Women's Premiership team. In Round 1 of the 2019 NRL Women's season, she made her debut for the Broncos, starting on the wing in a 14–4 win over the St George Illawarra Dragons. On 6 October, she started at fullback in the Broncos' 30–6 Grand Final win over the Dragons.

On 7 October, Upton was named in the Australian team for the 2019 World Cup 9s but withdrew and was replaced by Tarryn Aiken.

=== 2020 ===
In February, Upton played for the Broncos at the NRL Nines, where she was named in the Team of the Tournament. In March, Upton joined the Central Queensland Capras in the QRL Women's Premiership and later played for the Souths Logan Magpies in the Holcim Cup.

In Round 1 of the 2020 NRL Women's season, Upton scored a hat-trick in the first half for the Broncos in their win over the New Zealand Warriors at GIO Stadium. On 25 October, Upton started at fullback and scored a try in the Broncos' 20–10 Grand Final win over the Sydney Roosters.

On 13 November, Upton made her State of Origin debut for Queensland, scoring two tries in a 24–18 win over New South Wales.

=== 2021 ===
In 2021, Upton joined the Burleigh Bears in the QRL Women's Premiership, starting at fullback and scoring two tries in their Grand Final win over the Valleys Diehards. On 25 June, she started at fullback for Queensland in their 8–6 win over New South Wales.

On 29 June, Upton re-signed with the Broncos for the 2021 NRL Women's season.

=== 2022 ===
On 18 May 2022, the Newcastle Knights announced the signing of Upton and Millie Boyle ahead of the 2022 NRL Women's season. Upton made her club debut for the Knights in round 1 of the 2022 NRLW season against her former club the Brisbane Broncos.

In the 2022 Semi Final against the St. George Illawarra Dragons, Upton became the first Knights player to score more than one try in a game, when she scored two tries in the Knights' 30-6 win to qualify them for the Grand Final. Upton would be awarded the Karyn Murphy Medal when she was named player of the match in the 2022 NRL Women's Grand Final, scoring a try in the Knights' 32–12 victory over the Parramatta Eels. The victory was Upton's third premiership title.

Upton was named in the Australian squad for the 2021 Women's Rugby League World Cup, but withdrew from the squad due to injury.

=== 2023 ===
In April, Upton re-signed with the Knights on a contract until the end of 2027. Upton won the Dally M Medal (Player of the Year) as well as a second Karyn Murphy Medal (Grand Final Player of the Match) after back to back premierships with the Knights.

=== 2024 ===
In November, Upton was granted an immediate release from the remainder of her Knights contract due to family and personal circumstances. Upton returned to the Brisbane Broncos

=== 2025 ===
Upton was appointed co-captain of the Queensland Maroons for the State of Origin series alongside Ali Brigginshaw, she played the first two games, before missing game three due to injury. Upton was also appointed Co-Captain of the Brisbane Broncos in her return season at Red Hill along with Brigginshaw. Upton became the first NRLW player to win the Dally M Medal for a second time, having a huge hand in getting the Broncos to their first NRLW Grand Final in five years. Upton scored a whopping 19 tries in 12 games. In 2025, awarded the National Sportsperson of the Year at the National Aboriginal and Torres Strait Islander Sports Awards.

== Achievements and accolades ==
=== Representative ===
- Rugby League World Cup Champion: 2026
