= Julia Robinson (rugby league) =

Australia international rugby league footballer (born 1998)

Personal information
- Born: 6 January 1998 (age 28) Ipswich, Queensland, Australia
- Height: 170 cm (5 ft 7 in)
- Weight: 73 kg (11 st 7 lb)

Playing information
- Position: Centre, Wing
Club
Years	Team	Pld	T	G	FG	P
2018–	Brisbane Broncos	60	40	0	0	160
Representative
Years	Team	Pld	T	G	FG	P
2018–	Australia	15	24	0	0	96
2019	Australia 9s	4	1	0	0	5
2020–26	Queensland	11	3	0	0	12
- Source: RLP As of 16 November 2026

Julia Robinson (born 6 January 1998) is an Australian rugby league footballer who plays for the Brisbane Broncos in the NRL Women's Premiership. She has won four premierships with the Broncos: 2018, 2019, 2020, and 2025. Robinson previously played for Wests Panthers in the QRL Women's Premiership.

A centre or wing, she is an Australia and Queensland representative.

== Background ==
Robinson was born in Ipswich, Queensland and played netball growing up. Robinson attended Ferny Grove State High School graduating in 2015. As of 2025, Robinson is a Lance Corporal in the Australian Army, appointed to the Royal Australian Corps of Transport.

== Playing career ==
=== 2018 ===
In 2018, Robinson began playing rugby league, representing the Australian Defence Force at the Women's National Championships. On 21 June, she signed with the Brisbane Broncos NRL Women's Premiership team.

In Round 1 of the 2018 NRL Women's season, Robinson made her debut for the Broncos in a 30–4 win over the St George Illawarra Dragons. On 30 September, Robinson started on the wing in the Broncos' 34–12 Grand Final win over the Sydney Roosters.

On 13 October, Robinson made her debut for Australia, starting on the wing and scoring a try in a 26–24 win over New Zealand.

=== 2019 ===
In 2019, Robinson broke her leg in two places while playing for the Wests Panthers. The injury ruled her out of the Women's National Championships and the Women's State of Origin. She returned from her injury in Round 2 of the 2019 NRL Women's season.

On 6 October, she started on the wing and scored a try in the Broncos' 30–6 Grand Final win over the Dragons. Later that month, she represented Australia at the 2019 Rugby League World Cup 9s.

=== 2020 ===
On 25 October, Robinson won her third NRLW premiership, starting at centre in the Broncos' 20–10 Grand Final win over the Roosters. On 13 November, Robinson made her debut for Queensland, starting at centre in a 24–18 win over New South Wales.

=== 2021 ===
Robinson entered her 4th season in the NRLW. She was named to start on the wing in the Broncos opening match against the Roosters. She played the opening 52 minutes before succumbing to injury, she only managed 5 runs for 38 metres. She returned from her injury in the Semi final match, again against the Roosters. She scored her first and only try against for the 2021 season, as the Broncos came short in a shock loss, knocking them out of the finals.

=== 2022 ===
In September 2022, Robinson was named in the Dream Team announced by the Rugby League Players Association. The team was selected by the players, who each cast one vote for each position.

=== 2023 ===
In the opening game for the Brisbane Broncos of the 2023 NRLW season, Robinson played in their 36-18 loss against the Roosters, and came off early after 57 minutes. She returned from her hamstring injury in round 6 in a big 40-8 win against the Raiders. She picked up a try and ran for 160 metres, the most of any player. She scored a hat trick in the last game of the regular season in another big win for the Broncos, winning 46-12 and qualifying for the finals. She played in the semifinal loss to the eventual NRLW premiers Newcastle Knights. She finished the season with six games and five tries. This was her highest try tally in her career.

=== 2024 ===
In May and June, Robinson played on the wing in all three matches of the 2024 Women's State of Origin series, scoring the second of three tries for Queensland in the deciding third match.

From July to September, Robinson appeared in all ten matches played by the Brisbane Broncos in the 2024 NRLW season, including the semi-final loss to the Cronulla Sharks. With a tally of nine tries, Robinson shared top try scorer honours with Sheridan Gallagher (Newcastle Knights) and Tiana Penitani (Cronulla Sharks). Robinson was selected as the Broncos' NRLW Player of the Year.

During October and November, Robinson appeared on the wing in all three matches played by Australia in the 2024 Pacific Championships. in the opening match against Papua New Guinea Orchids, Robinson scored six tries. This was a new record for most tries in a match by the Australian Jilaroos and equalled the international record held by New Zealand Kiwi Ferns Fuarosa Time (versus Tokelau in 2003) and Honey Hireme (versus Cook Islands in 2017).

=== 2025 ===
In March, Robinson scored three of Australia's seventeen tries in their 90-4 win over England.

During May, Robinson played on the wing in all three matches of the 2025 Women's State of Origin series.

From July to October, Robinson appeared at centre in twelve of the thirteen matches played by the Broncos as they won the 2025 NRLW season premiership. This included the Grand Final. Robinson again scored nine tries in the NRLW season, however in a competition expanded in both teams and rounds, she finished equal sixth in the top try scorers list.

Robinson appeared on the wing in all three matches played by Australia in the 2025 Pacific Championships during October and November. The two tries Robinson scored in Australia's first match against Fetu Samoa saw her equalise and then pass her teammate, Isabelle Kelly, as the Jillaroos all time top try scorer. For her second try, Robinson leapt at an angle and with arms outstretched caught a kick to immediately touchdown. Robinson added two tries in the Pacific Cup Final. The first saw her leap vertically and with arms outstretched catch a kick, before making a short run to touchdown. Robinson's second try of the final extended her tally in international matches to 22.

In December, Robinson was announced as the winner of the women's 2025 IRL Golden Boot Award, alongside Harry Grant (men) and Rob Hawkins (wheelchair).

== Achievements and accolades ==
=== Representative ===
- Rugby League World Cup Champion: 2026
