= Brisbane Broncos Women =

Australian rugby league football club

Brisbane Broncos

Club information
- Full name: Brisbane Broncos Rugby League Club Ltd.
- Nickname: Broncos
- Colours: Maroon; Gold
- Founded: Team: September 2018; 8 years ago Club: April 1988; 38 years ago
- Website: broncos.com.au

Current details
- Ground: Suncorp Stadium (52,500)
- CEO: Dave Donaghy
- Chairman: Karl Morris
- Coach: Scott Prince
- Manager: Paul Dyer
- Captain: Tamika Upton
- Competition: National Rugby League
- 2025 season: Premiers
- Current season

Uniforms
Home colours	Away colours

Records
- Premierships: 4 (2018, 2019, 2020, 2025)
- Runners-up: 0
- Minor premierships: 5 (2018, 2019, 2020, 2021, 2024)
- Biggest win: Broncos 50 – 4 Cowboys; Totally Workwear Stadium (13 Sep 2025)
- Biggest loss: Broncos 4 – 28 Raiders; GIO Stadium (9 Aug 2026)
- First game: Broncos 30 – 4 Dragons; Suncorp Stadium (9 Sep 2018)
- Most capped: 69 – Chelsea Lenarduzzi
- Highest try scorer: 42 – Tamika Upton
- Highest points scorer: 196 – Romy Teitzel

Brisbane Broncos Women are a rugby league team, representing the city of Brisbane, Queensland. The team is part of the Brisbane Broncos club and plays in the National Rugby League Women's Premiership.

== Seasons ==
Season	Regular season								Finals		Nines	Ref
Season	P	W	D	L	F	A	Pts	Pos	Top	Placing	Nines	Ref
2018	3	3	0	0	76	18	6	1st	2	Premiers	—	
2019	3	3	0	0	42	14	4	1st	2	Premiers	—	
2020	3	3	0	0	70	34	6	1st	2	Premiers	RU	
2021	5	5	0	0	134	64	8	1st	4	Semi-finalist	—	
2022	5	1	0	4	78	111	2	5th	4	—	—	
2023	9	6	0	3	256	165	12	4th	4	Semi-finalist	—	
2024	9	7	0	2	272	156	14	1st	4	Semi-finalist	—	
2025	11	10	0	1	404	116	20	2nd	6	Premiers	—	
2026	11	8	0	3	340	182	16	3rd	6	Runners up	—	

=== 2026 Draw ===
The draw for the 2026 season was announced on 14 November 2025.

Round	Opponent	Score	Date	Time	Venue	
1	Cowboys	50–4	Sat 4 Jul 2026	5:15 PM	Home	Suncorp Stadium
2	Sharks	22–16	Thu 9 Jul 2026	7:45 PM	Away	Sharks Stadium
3	Tigers	40–12	Sun 19 Jul 2026	1:45 PM	Home	Totally Workwear Stadium
4	Knights	30–12	Sun 26 Jul 2026	1:45 PM	Home	Totally Workwear Stadium
5	Bulldogs	34–4	Sun 2 Aug 2026	12:00 PM	Neutral	Geohex Stadium, Wagga Wagga
6	Raiders	4–28	Sun 9 Aug 2026	11:35 AM	Away	GIO Stadium
7	Roosters	20–34	Sat 15 Aug 2026	5:15 PM	Home	Suncorp Stadium
8	Titans	20–28	Sun 23 Aug 2026	11:50 AM	Away	Cbus Super Stadium
9	Eels	44–10	Sun 30 Aug 2026	1:45 PM	Away	CommBank Stadium
10	Dragons	24–16	Sun 6 Sep 2026	11:50 AM	Away	WIN Stadium
11	Warriors	52–18	Sun 13 Sep 2026	12:00 PM	Home	Totally Workwear Stadium
FW1	Knights	40–16	Sat 19 Sep 2026	4:05 PM	Home	Totally Workwear Stadium
FW2	Titans	20–8	Sun 27 Sep 2026	1:05 PM	Away	Cbus Super Stadium
GF	Roosters	6–30	Sun 4 Oct 2026	4:00 PM	Neutral	Accor Stadium

== Head-to-head records ==
Opponent	First meeting	P	W	D	L	For	Agst	Win %	Share %
Dragons	9 Sep 2018	10	9	0	1	276	103	90.00%	72.82%
Roosters	14 Sep 2018	14	7	0	7	260	272	50.00%	48.87%
Warriors	21 Sep 2018	5	4	0	1	146	58	80.00%	71.57%
Knights	6 Mar 2022	9	6	0	3	264	168	66.67%	61.11%
Titans	19 Mar 2022	7	4	0	3	192	93	57.14%	67.37%
Eels	27 Sep 2022	6	4	0	2	168	80	66.67%	67.74%
Cowboys	5 Aug 2023	4	4	0	0	178	32	100.00%	84.76%
Raiders	27 Aug 2023	4	3	0	1	116	86	75.00%	57.43%
Sharks	2 Sep 2023	5	4	0	1	102	88	80.00%	53.68%
Tigers	9 Sep 2023	4	4	0	0	134	48	100.00%	73.63%
Bulldogs	31 Aug 2025	2	2	0	0	78	4	100.00%	95.12%
Totals	9 Sep 2018	70	51	0	19	1914	1032	72.86%	64.97%

Notes

- Share % is the percentage of points For over the sum of points For and Against.
- Clubs listed in the order that the Broncos Women first played them.
- As of 9 October 2026

== Coaches ==
In mid-November 2022 the Broncos announced the appointment of Scott Prince as head coach for the 2023 NRL Women's season.
As of 9 October 2026

Coach	Season Span	M	W	D	L	For	Agst	Win %	Share %
Paul Dyer	2018	4	4	0	0	110	30	100.00%	78.57%
Kelvin Wright	2019–2022	19	12	0	7	390	261	63.16%	59.91%
Scott Prince	2023–2026	46	35	0	12	1,414	741	74.47%	65.61%

== Captains ==
All players that have captained the Brisbane Broncos Women's team in NRLW matches.
As of 5 October 2026

C#	Name	Years as Captain	Debut		Games as Captain			Games for Club	Ref
C#	Name	Years as Captain	Date	Round	Solo	Joint	Total	Games for Club	Ref
1	Ali Brigginshaw	2018–2025	9 Sep 2018	1	43	13	56	67	
2	Tamika Upton	2025–present	5 Jul 2025	1	14	13	27	38	

== Current squad ==
Jersey numbers in the table reflect the team list announced for the Grand Final.
Table last updated on 5 October 2026.

J#	Player	Age	Position(s)	NRLW seasons				NRLW stats					Origin	Tests	All Stars
J#	Player	Age	Position(s)	Debut	2018–24	2025	2026	M	T	G	Pts	Prems	Origin	Tests	All Stars
1	Tamika Upton	29	Fullback	2019	11 26	13	14	64	61	0	244	3 2	12	8	2
2	Kerri Johnson	23	Wing	2025	—	13	13	26	21	0	84	1	—	—	—
3	Deleni Paitai	18	Centre, Second-row	2026	—	R	11	11	2	0	8	—	—	2	—
4	Georgia Bartlett	—	Centre, Five-eighth	2026	—	R	14	14	6	0	24	—	—	—	—
5	Julia Robinson	28	Wing, Centre	2018	34	12	14	60	40	0	160	4	12	13	—
6	Ali Brigginshaw	36	Five-eighth, Lock	2018	43	13	11	67	14	36	128	4	20	29	6
7	Jesse Southwell	21	Halfback	2022	27	13	14	54	9	158	352	2	8	3	—
8	Shannon Mato	28	Prop	2020	4 27	P	14	45	4	0	16	1	8	9	5
9	Jada Ferguson	24	Hooker, Five-eighth	2021	26	13	13	52	9	0	36	1	5	—	—
10	Brianna Clark	31	Prop	2020	2 4 20	11	12	49	4	16	48	1	2	9	—
11	Lauren Dam	29	Second-row, Centre	2021	2 17	11	14	44	20	0	80	1	—	—	—
12	Romy Teitzel	27	Second-row	2020	20 12	13	14	59	17	74	216	2 1	11	—	—
13	Lillian Yarrow	22	Lock, Prop	2024	3	12	13	28	1	0	4	—	1	—	—
14	Rhemy Hinckesman	—	Hooker, Lock	2026	—	R	12	12	2	0	8	—	—	—	—
15	Chelsea Lenarduzzi	30	Prop, Second-row	2018	42	13	14	69	22	0	88	4	9	1	—
16	Reegan Hicks	20	Second-row	2025	—	4	7	11	0	0	0	1	—	—	—
17	Harlem Walker	18	Second-row	2026	—	R	10	10	2	0	8	—	—	—	—
18	Caitlin Urwin	26	Wing	2026	—	RU	8	8	2	0	8	—	—	—	—
19	Tara McGrath-West	25	Second-row, Prop	2022	13	3	1	17	0	0	0	1	—	—	—
20	Linneke Gevers	28	Second-row, Prop	—	—	R	—	0	0	0	0	—	—	4	—
21	Breanna Eales	35	Prop, Lock	2023	4 4	10	—	18	0	0	0	—	—	—	—
22	Amanii Misa	19	Prop, Second-row	—	—	R	—	0	0	0	0	—	—	—	—
–	Skyla Adams	21	Five-eighth, Centre	2024	2	1	—	3	0	0	0	1	—	—	—
–	Azalleyah Maaka	26	Centre	2025	—	2	—	2	0	0	0	1	—	—	—
–	Tavarna Papalii	21	Lock	2024	8	R	1	9	0	0	0	1	3	5	—
–	Lila Parr	18	Five-eighth, Centre	—	—	R	—	0	0	0	0	—	—	—	—
IJ	Destiny Brill	23	Hooker	2021	6 6 18	11	2	43	12	0	48	1	11	5	2
IJ	Bree Spreadborough	28	Lock, Prop	2024	2	5	12	19	2	0	8	1	—	—	—
DV	Tia Molo	18	Centre	—	—	U	—	0	0	0	0	—	—	2	—
IS	Shalom Sauaso	18	Lock, Centre	2025	—	10	—	10	5	0	20	1	—	2
P	Hayley Maddick	34	Wing, Fullback	2021	29	13	P	42	14	0	56	1	1	—	—

Notes:

- Hayley Maddick will miss the 2026 season due to her pregnancy.
- Linneke Gevers and Rhemy Hinckesman were signed on a supplementary contract for 2026.
- The following players are on a development contract in 2026:
  - Breanna Eales
  - Tia Molo
  - Deleni Paitai
  - Lila Parr
- Supplementary contract player Rhemy Hinckesman was named on the interchange bench in the Round 1 team. Linneke Gevers and Deleni Paitai were named amongst the five reserves.
- The following players were on a development contract in 2025:
  - Georgia Bartlett (Queensland Country in 2024)
  - Amanii Misa (Queensland City in 2024)
- Tafito Lafaele was released in early April 2026, enabling her to take up a rugby union contract offer with the Blues in the 2026 Aupiki season.

The Brisbane Broncos announced contract extensions in several instalments from August 2025. The Brisbane Broncos announced player signings in several instalments from October 2025.

== 2027 Gains & Losses ==
=== Players in ===
- Destiny Mino-Sinapati from Titans
- Martha Mataele from Eels

=== Players out ===
- Amanii Misa to Cowboys

Retirement

- Ali Brigginshaw

Released

- Skyla Adams
- Breanna Eales (Dev)
- Linneke Gevers (Sup)
- Azalleyah Maaka
- Tara McGrath-West
- Caitlin Urwin

Off contract

- Rhemy Hinckesman
- Kerri Johnson
- Deleni Paitai (Sup)

=== Off contract after 2027 ===
- Georgia Bartlett
- Destiny Brill
- Brianna Clark
- Lauren Dam
- Reegan Hicks
- Chelsea Lenarduzzi
- Shannon Mato
- Tavarna Papalii
- Julia Robinson
- Shalom Sauaso
- Jesse Southwell
- Bree Spreadborough
- Romy Teitzel
- Tamika Upton
- Lillian Yarrow

== Individual award winners ==
=== Club awards ===
The Brisbane Broncos player of the year and other club award winners since 2018.

Season	Player of the Year	Player's Player	Best Back	Best Forward	Rookie	Play of the Year	Ref
2018	Brittany Breayley-Nati	Kimiora Breayley-Nati	Kimiora Breayley-Nati	Brittany Breayley-Nati	—	—	
2019	Ali Brigginshaw	Rona Peters	Ali Brigginshaw	Millie Elliott	—	—	
2020	Amber Hall	Amber Hall & Tarryn Aiken	Tamika Upton	Amber Hall	—	Chelsea Lenarduzzi	
2021	Millie Elliott	Lauren Brown	Shenae Ciesiolka	Millie Elliott	Emily Bass	Shenae Ciesiolka	
2022	Jaime Chapman	Jaime Chapman	Tarryn Aiken	Jasmine Solia	Jasmine Solia	Tarryn Aiken	
2023	Mariah Denman	Mariah Denman & Mele Hufanga	Ali Brigginshaw	Annetta Nu'uausala	Mele Hufanga	Mele Hufanga	
2024	Julia Robinson	Julia Robinson	Julia Robinson	Keilee Joseph	Stacey Waaka	Chelsea Lenarduzzi	
2025	Tamika Upton	Tamika Upton	Tamika Upton	Keilee Joseph	Shalom Sauaso	Tamika Upton	
2026	Tamika Upton	Tamika Upton	Tamika Upton	Chelsea Lenarduzzi	Georgia Bartlett	Tamika Upton & Chelsea Lenarduzzi	

The following other club awards have been presented:
- 2019: Fan Player of the Year: Amber Pilley
- 2021: Coach's Award: Julia Robinson
- 2023: Most Consistent: Mariah Denman
- 2024: Most Consistent: Julia Robinson
- 2025: Most Consistent: Julia Robinson
- 2026: Most Consistent: Lauren Dam
- 2026: Community: Ali Brigginshaw

Name changes since winning an award

- Brittany Breayley to Brittany Breayley-Nati
- Kimiora Nati to Kimiora Breayley-Nati
- Millie Boyle to Millie Elliott
- Jasmine Fogavini to Jasmine Solia
- Mariah Storch to Mariah Denman

=== Dally M Winners ===
Year	Name	Ref
2018	Brittany Breayley-Nati	
2020	Ali Brigginshaw	
2021	Millie Elliott	
2025	Tamika Upton	
2026	Tamika Upton	

== Club records ==
Win loss record since entering the NRLW in 2018

Games	Wins	Drawn	Loss	Points For	Points Against	+/-	Win %
70	51	0	19	1,914	1,032	+882	72.86%

=== Player records ===
Lists and tables last updated: 9 October 2026.

==== Career records (at the Broncos) ====
===== Most games for the Broncos =====
Qualification: 20 games

Rank	Player	Span	Games
1	Chelsea Lenarduzzi	2018–	69
2	Ali Brigginshaw	2018–26	67
3	Julia Robinson	2018–	60
4	Jada Ferguson	2021–	52
5	Romy Teitzel	2020, 2023–	47
7	Brianna Clark	2022–	43
6	Hayley Maddick	2021–25	42
6	Lauren Dam	2023–	42
9	Shenae Ciesiolka	2020–25	40
10	Tamika Upton	2019-21, 2025–	38
11	Mele Hufanga	2023–25	33
12	Destiny Brill	2023–	31
13	Lavinia Gould	2018–24	30
14	Gayle Broughton	2023–25	29
15	Annetta Nu'uausala	2022–25	26
15	Kerri Johnson	2025–	26
17	Mariah Denman	2018-19, 2023-24	23
17	Keilee Joseph	2024–25	23
19	Tazmin Rapana	2019, 2023-24	21

===== Most points for the Broncos =====
Qualification: 20 points

Rank	Player	2026 Club	M	T	G	FG	Points
1	Romy Teitzel		47	12	74	0	196
2	Tamika Upton		38	42	0	0	168
3	Julia Robinson		60	40	0	0	160
4	Ali Brigginshaw		67	14	36	0	128
5	Jesse Southwell		14	2	56	0	120
6	Mele Hufanga		33	25	0	0	100
7	Chelsea Lenarduzzi		69	22	0	0	88
8	Kerri Johnson		26	21	0	0	84
9	Lauren Dam		42	20	0	0	80
10	Shenae Ciesiolka		40	17	0	0	68
11	Hayley Maddick	—	42	14	0	0	56
12	Meg Ward	—	10	3	18	0	48
13	Chelsea Baker	—	7	2	18	0	44
14	Lauren Brown		10	1	19	0	42
15	Jada Ferguson		52	9	0	0	36
16	Brianna Clark		43	4	9	0	34
17	Destiny Brill		31	8	0	0	32
17	Gayle Broughton		29	8	0	0	32
19	Tarryn Aiken		19	6	1	0	26
20	Stacey Waaka		6	6	0	0	24
20	Georgia Bartlett		14	6	0	0	24
22	Tazmin Rapana	—	21	5	0	0	20
22	Shalom Sauaso		10	5	0	0	20

===== Most tries for the Broncos =====
Qualification: 5 tries

Rank	Player	Tries
1	Tamika Upton	42
2	Julia Robinson	40
3	Mele Hufanga	25
4	Chelsea Lenarduzzi	22
5	Kerri Johnson	21
6	Lauren Dam	20
7	Shenae Ciesiolka	17
8	Ali Brigginshaw	14
8	Hayley Maddick	14
10	Romy Teitzel	12
11	Jada Ferguson	9
12	Destiny Brill	8
12	Gayle Broughton	8
14	Tarryn Aiken	6
14	Stacey Waaka	6
14	Georgia Bartlett	6
17	Tazmin Rapana	5
17	Shalom Sauaso	5

===== Most goals for the Broncos =====
All goal kickers

Rank	Player	Goals
1	Romy Teitzel	74
2	Jesse Southwell	56
3	Ali Brigginshaw	36
4	Lauren Brown	19
4	Chelsea Baker	19
6	Meg Ward	18
7	Brianna Clark	9
8	Mariah Denman	6
9	Tarryn Aiken	1

===== Most Field Goals for the Broncos =====
No instances to date

==== Season records ====
Season length has increased over time as the competition has expanded.

===== Most points in a season for the Broncos =====
Qualification: 20 points

Rank	Player	Season	M	T	G	FG	Points
1	Jesse Southwell	2026	14	2	56	0	120
2	Romy Teitzel	2025	13	4	50	0	116
3	Ali Brigginshaw	2023	10	5	32	0	84
4	Tamika Upton	2025	13	20	0	0	80
5	Romy Teitzel	2024	9	4	24	0	64
6	Tamika Upton	2026	14	15	0	0	60
7	Kerri Johnson	2026	13	11	0	0	44
8	Mele Hufanga	2023	10	10	0	0	40
8	Kerri Johnson	2025	13	10	0	0	40
10	Chelsea Baker	2018	4	2	15	0	38
10	Lauren Brown	2021	6	0	19	0	38
12	Julia Robinson	2024	10	9	0	0	36
12	Julia Robinson	2025	12	9	0	0	36
14	Mele Hufanga	2025	13	8	0	0	32
14	Hayley Maddick	2025	13	8	0	0	32
14	Julia Robinson	2026	14	8	0	0	32
17	Meg Ward	2020	4	1	13	0	30
18	Lauren Dam	2023	10	7	0	0	28
18	Mele Hufanga	2024	10	7	0	0	28
18	Lauren Dam	2026	14	7	0	0	28
21	Stacey Waaka	2024	6	6	0	0	24
21	Georgia Bartlett	2026	14	6	0	0	24
21	Chelsea Lenarduzzi	2026	14	6	0	0	24
24	Tamika Upton	2020	4	5	0	0	20
24	Shenae Ciesiolka	2023	10	5	0	0	20
24	Julia Robinson	2023	6	5	0	0	20
24	Shenae Ciesiolka	2024	8	5	0	0	20
24	Shalom Sauaso	2025	10	5	0	0	20

===== Most tries in a season for the Broncos =====
Qualification: 5 tries

Rank	Player	Season	M	Tries
1	Tamika Upton	2025	13	20
2	Tamika Upton	2026	13	15
3	Kerri Johnson	2026	12	11
4	Mele Hufanga	2023	10	10
4	Kerri Johnson	2025	13	10
6	Julia Robinson	2024	10	9
6	Julia Robinson	2025	12	9
8	Mele Hufanga	2025	13	8
8	Hayley Maddick	2025	13	8
8	Julia Robinson	2026	13	8
11	Lauren Dam	2023	10	7
11	Mele Hufanga	2024	10	7
11	Lauren Dam	2026	13	7
14	Stacey Waaka	2024	6	6
14	Georgia Bartlett	2026	13	6
14	Chelsea Lenarduzzi	2026	13	6
17	Tamika Upton	2020	4	5
17	Ali Brigginshaw	2023	10	5
17	Shenae Ciesiolka	2023	10	5
17	Julia Robinson	2023	6	5
17	Shenae Ciesiolka	2024	8	5
17	Shalom Sauaso	2025	10	5

==== Match records ====
===== Most points in a game for the Broncos =====
Qualification: 12 points

Rank	Player	Date	Opponent	Venue	T	G	FG	Points
1	Chelsea Baker	9 Sep 2018	Dragons	Suncorp Stadium	2	5	0	18
2	Mele Hufanga	5 Aug 2023	Cowboys	Queensland Country Bank Stadium	4	0	0	16
2	Mele Hufanga	11 Aug 2024	Titans	Totally Workwear Stadium	4	0	0	16
2	Tamika Upton	31 Aug 2025	Bulldogs	Totally Workwear Stadium	4	0	0	16
2	Romy Teitzel	11 Aug 2024	Titans	Totally Workwear Stadium	1	6	0	16
2	Romy Teitzel	10 Aug 2025	Raiders	GIO Stadium	1	6	0	16
2	Jesse Southwell	19 Jul 2026	Tigers	Totally Workwear Stadium	1	6	0	16
8	Romy Teitzel	13 Sep 2025	Cowboys	Totally Workwear Stadium	0	7	0	14
8	Romy Teitzel	24 Aug 2025	Knights	McDonald Jones Stadium	1	5	0	14
8	Jesse Southwell	13 Sep 2026	Warriors	Totally Workwear Stadium	0	7	0	14
11	Kimiora Breayley-Nati	30 Sep 2018	Roosters	ANZ Stadium	3	0	0	12
11	Tamika Upton	3 Oct 2020	Warriors	GIO Stadium	3	0	0	12
11	Julia Robinson	16 Sep 2023	Dragons	Netstrata Jubilee Stadium	3	0	0	12
11	Tamika Upton	2 Aug 2025	Sharks	McDonald Jones Stadium	3	0	0	12
11	Tamika Upton	13 Sep 2025	Cowboys	Totally Workwear Stadium	3	0	0	12
11	Jaime Chapman	3 Sep 2022	Titans	Moreton Daily Stadium	3	0	0	12
11	Romy Teitzel	13 Jul 2025	Titans	Cbus Super Stadium	0	6	0	12
11	Ali Brigginshaw	5 Aug 2023	Cowboys	Queensland Country Bank Stadium	1	4	0	12
11	Kerri Johnson	4 Jul 2026	Cowboys	Suncorp Stadium	3	0	0	12
11	Tamika Upton	9 Jul 2026	Sharks	Ocean Protect Stadium	3	0	0	12
11	Kerri Johnson	30 Aug 2026	Eels	CommBank Stadium	3	0	0	12
11	Jesse Southwell	30 Aug 2026	Eels	CommBank Stadium	0	6	0	12
11	Jesse Southwell	19 Sep 2026	Knights	Totally Workwear Stadium	0	6	0	12

===== Most tries in a game for the Broncos =====
Qualification: 3 tries

Rank	Player	Date	Opponent	Venue	Tries
1	Mele Hufanga	5 Aug 2023	Cowboys	Queensland Country Bank Stadium	4
1	Mele Hufanga	11 Aug 2024	Titans	Totally Workwear Stadium	4
1	Tamika Upton	31 Aug 2025	Bulldogs	Totally Workwear Stadium	4
4	Kimiora Breayley-Nati	30 Sep 2018	Roosters	ANZ Stadium	3
4	Tamika Upton	3 Oct 2020	Warriors	GIO Stadium	3
4	Jaime Chapman	3 Sep 2022	Titans	Moreton Daily Stadium	3
4	Julia Robinson	16 Sep 2023	Dragons	Netstrata Jubilee Stadium	3
4	Tamika Upton	2 Aug 2025	Sharks	McDonald Jones Stadium	3
4	Tamika Upton	13 Sep 2025	Cowboys	Totally Workwear Stadium	3
4	Kerri Johnson	4 Jul 2026	Cowboys	Suncorp Stadium	3
4	Tamika Upton	9 Jul 2026	Sharks	Ocean Protect Stadium	3
4	Kerri Johnson	30 Aug 2026	Eels	CommBank Stadium	3

===== Most goals in a game for the Broncos =====
Qualification: 5 goals

Rank	Player	Date	Opponent	Venue	Goals
1	Romy Teitzel	13 Sep 2025	Cowboys	Totally Workwear Stadium	7
2	Jesse Southwell	13 Sep 2026	Warriors	Totally Workwear Stadium	7
3	Romy Teitzel	11 Aug 2024	Titans	Totally Workwear Stadium	6
3	Romy Teitzel	25 Aug 2024	Tigers	Leichhardt Oval	6
3	Romy Teitzel	13 Jul 2025	Titans	Cbus Super Stadium	6
3	Romy Teitzel	10 Aug 2025	Raiders	GIO Stadium	6
3	Jesse Southwell	19 Jul 2026	Tigers	Totally Workwear Stadium	6
3	Jesse Southwell	30 Aug 2026	Eels	CommBank Stadium	6
3	Jesse Southwell	19 Sep 2026	Knights	Totally Workwear Stadium	6
10	Chelsea Baker	9 Sep 2018	Dragons	Suncorp Stadium	5
10	Chelsea Baker	30 Sep 2018	Roosters	ANZ Stadium	5
10	Meg Ward	6 Oct 2019	Dragons	ANZ Stadium	5
10	Lauren Brown	27 Mar 2022	Eels	Suncorp Stadium	5
10	Ali Brigginshaw	16 Sep 2023	Dragons	Netstrata Jubilee Stadium	5
10	Mariah Denman	21 Sep 2024	Dragons	Queensland Country Bank Stadium	5
10	Romy Teitzel	24 Aug 2025	Knights	McDonald Jones Stadium	5
10	Jesse Southwell	4 Jul 2026	Cowboys	Suncorp Stadium	5
10	Jesse Southwell	26 Jul 2026	Knights	Totally Workwear Stadium	5
10	Jesse Southwell	1 Aug 2026	Bulldogs	Geohex Stadium, Wagga Wagga	5

==== Oldest and youngest players ====
The oldest and youngest players to represent the Brisbane Broncos NRLW team.

Name	Age	Year
Lavinia Gould	41 and 199 days	2024
Shalom Sauaso	18 and 32 days	2025

==== First Try and Last Try ====
Who scored the first try and most recent try for the Broncos.

Name	Year	Round	Minute	Opponent
Chelsea Baker	2018	1	2'	Dragons
Jesse Southwell	2026	GF	65'	Roosters

=== Margins and streaks ===
Biggest winning margins
Qualification: 25 point margin

Margin	Score	Opponent	Venue	Date	Round
46	50–4	Cowboys	Totally Workwear Stadium	13 Sep 2025	11
46	50–4	Cowboys	Suncorp Stadium	4 Jul 2026	1
44	44–0	Bulldogs	Totally Workwear Stadium	31 Aug 2025	9
40	44–4	Titans	Totally Workwear Stadium	11 Aug 2024	3
40	44–4	Titans	Cbus Super Stadium	13 Jul 2025	2
34	38–4	Eels	Suncorp Stadium	27 Mar 2022	5
34	46–12	Dragons	Netstrata Jubilee Stadium	16 Sep 2023	9
34	38–4	Eels	Suncorp Stadium	16 Aug 2025	7
34	44–10	Eels	CommBank Stadium	30 Aug 2026	9
34	52–18	Warriors	Totally Workwear Stadium	15 Sep 2026	11
32	40–8	Raiders	Totally Workwear Stadium	27 Aug 2023	6
30	46–16	Knights	McDonald Jones Stadium	24 Aug 2025	8
30	44–14	Tigers	Leichhardt Oval	25 Aug 2024	5
30	44–14	Dragons	Queensland Country Bank Stadium	21 Sep 2024	9
30	34–4	Bulldogs	Geohex Park, Wagga Wagga	2 Aug 2026	5
28	40–12	Cowboys	Queensland Country Bank Stadium	5 Aug 2023	3
28	40–12	Tigers	Totally Workwear Stadium	19 Jul 2026	3
26	30–4	Dragons	Suncorp Stadium	9 Sep 2018	1
26	38–12	Cowboys	Totally Workwear Stadium	1 Sep 2024	6

Biggest losing margins
Qualification: 10 point margin

Margin	Score	Opponent	Venue	Date	Round
24	4–28	Raiders	GIO Stadium	9 Aug 2026	6
24	6–30	Roosters	Accor Stadium	4 Oct 2026	Grand Final
20	8–28	Roosters	Suncorp Stadium	27 Aug 2022	2
18	18–36	Roosters	Sunshine Coast Stadium	22 Jul 2023	1
18	14–32	Knights	McDonald Jones Stadium	21 Aug 2022	1
16	12–28	Roosters	Allianz Stadium	4 Aug 2024	2
14	0–14	Sharks	Totally Workwear Stadium	29 Sep 2024	Semi Final
14	20–34	Roosters	Suncorp Stadium	15 Aug 2026	7
12	10–22	Eels	Suncorp Stadium	27 Jul 2024	1
12	16–28	Eels	Central Coast Stadium	18 Sep 2022	5

Most consecutive wins

- 15 – (27 July 2025 – 5 October 2025, and 4 July 2026 – 2 August 2026)
- 8 – (6 October 2019 – 13 March 2022)
- 7 – (11 August 2024 – 21 September 2024)

Most consecutive losses

- 4 – (11 September 2022 — 27 July 2023)
- 3 – (3 April 2022 — 27 August 2022)
- 3 – (24 September 2023 — 4 August 2024)
- 3 – (9 August 2026 — 23 August 2026)

Biggest Comeback

- Recovered from 14 point deficit, trailed Newcastle Knights 18-4 after 46 minutes at McDonald Jones Stadium on September 8 2024 and won 32-24

Worst Collapse

- Surrendered a 16 point lead. Led Sydney Roosters 16-0 after 19 minutes at Leichhardt Oval in 2021 Semi Final on April 3 2022 and lost 16-22

== Attendances ==
As of 28 September 2026

Ground	Game day format	Matches	Aggregate	Average	Highest				
Ground	Game day format	Matches	Aggregate	Average	Crowd	Match details			
Ground	Game day format	Matches	Aggregate	Average	Crowd	Season	Round	Opponent	NRL Opponent
Lang Park	Stand Alone	1	11,816	11,816	11,816	2022	2	Roosters	—
Lang Park	NRLW and NRL	6	88,613	14,769	21,367	2025	PF	Knights	Panthers
Lang Park	Total	7	100,429	14,347	21,367	2025	PF	Knights	Panthers
Langlands Park	Stand Alone	10	19,722	1,972	2,521	2026	EF	Knights	—
Dolphin Stadium (Brisbane)	Stand Alone	1	1,619	1,619	1,619	2022	3	Titans	—
Sunshine Coast Stadium	Stand Alone	1	2,832	2,832	2,832	2023	1	Roosters	Zero

Note: Tallies exclude matches for which the NRLW crowd was either not published or not distinct from the crowd published for the NRL match.
- Suncorp Stadium: 2021 (postponed season), Round 5 (27 March 2022) vs Eels.
- Totally Workwear Stadium: 2024, Round 4 vs Raiders.
- Totally Workwear Stadium: 2024, Round 6 vs Cowboys.

== History ==
In 2017, the Brisbane Broncos launched a bid to enter a team in the inaugural NRL Women's Premiership in 2018. On 27 March 2018, the club won a license to participate in the inaugural NRL Women's season, on the back of a strong bid which included the NRL's desire for a geographical spread. Paul Dyer was named as the coach of the women's side, but stepped down after the inaugural season to concentrate on his role as game development manager. Kelvin Wright was named his replacement in May 2019.

In June 2018, Ali Brigginshaw, Brittany Breayley, Heather Ballinger, Teuila Fotu-Moala and Caitlyn Moran were unveiled as the club's first five signings. Tain Drinkwater was also appointed the CEO of the team.

The club won the inaugural NRL Women's Premiership title by defeating the Sydney Roosters by 34–12 in the 2018 NRL Women's Premiership Grand Final.

First game

Result	Score	Opponent	Venue	Date
Won	30–4	St George Illawarra Dragons	Suncorp Stadium	9 Sep 2018

=== First Team ===
The first ever Brisbane Broncos who played the St George Illawarra Dragons on the 9th September 2018 at Suncorp Stadium. The Brisbane Broncos won the match 30-4.

Jersey	Position	Player
1	Fullback	Chelsea Baker
2	Wing	Julia Robinson
3	Centre	Amelia Kuk
4	Centre	Amber Pilley
5	Wing	Meg Ward
6	Five-eighth	Kimiora Breayley-Nati
7	Halfback	Ali Brigginshaw (c)
8	Prop	Heather Ballinger
9	Hooker	Brittany Breayley-Nati
10	Prop	Steph Hancock
11	Second-row	Teuila Fotu-Moala
12	Second-row	Maitua Feterika
13	Lock	Rona Peters
14	Hooker	Lavinia Gould
15	Prop	Chelsea Lenarduzzi
16	Lock	Mariah Denman
17	Prop	Ngatokotoru Arakua
	Coach	Paul Dyer

=== Grand Final appearances ===
Result	Score	Opponent	Venue	Date	Ref
Won	34–12	Sydney Roosters	ANZ Stadium	30 Sep 2018	
Won	30–6	St George Illawarra Dragons	ANZ Stadium	6 Oct 2019	
Won	20–10	Sydney Roosters	ANZ Stadium	25 Oct 2020	
Won	22–18	Sydney Roosters	Accor Stadium	5 Oct 2025	

==== Premiership winning teams ====
The four Brisbane Broncos premiership winning teams from 2018, 2019, 2020 and 2025.

2018 Grand Final
Brisbane Broncos 34 defeated Sydney Roosters 12 at ANZ Stadium on 30th September 2018.

Jersey	Position	Player
1	Fullback	Chelsea Baker
2	Wing	Julia Robinson
3	Centre	Meg Ward
4	Centre	Amber Pilley
5	Wing	Amelia Kuk
6	Five-eighth	Kimiora Breayley-Nati
7	Halfback	Ali Brigginshaw (c)
8	Prop	Heather Ballinger
9	Hooker	Brittany Breayley-Nati
15	Prop	Chelsea Lenarduzzi
11	Second-row	Teuila Fotu-Moala
12	Second-row	Maitua Feterika
13	Lock	Rona Peters
10	Prop	Steph Hancock
14	Hooker	Lavinia Gould
16	Lock	Mariah Denman
17	Prop	Ngatokotoru Arakua
	Coach	Paul Dyer

2019 Grand Final
Brisbane Broncos 30 defeated St George Illawarra Dragons 6 at ANZ Stadium on 6th October 2019.

Jersey	Position	Player
18	Fullback	Tamika Upton
2	Wing	Julia Robinson
3	Centre	Amy Turner
4	Centre	Amber Pilley
5	Wing	Meg Ward
6	Five-eighth	Raecene McGregor
7	Halfback	Ali Brigginshaw (c)
8	Prop	Millie Elliott
9	Hooker	Lavinia Gould
10	Prop	Amber Hall
11	Second-row	Annette Brander
12	Second-row	Tazmin Rapana
13	Lock	Rona Peters
14	Prop	Tarryn Aiken
15	Hooker	Steph Hancock
16	Lock	Mariah Denman
17	Prop	Chelsea Lenarduzzi
	Coach	Kelvin Wright

2020 Grand Final

Brisbane Broncos 20 defeated Sydney Roosters 10 at ANZ Stadium on 25th October 2020.

Jersey	Position	Player
1	Fullback	Tamika Upton
2	Wing	Shenae Ciesiolka
3	Centre	Julia Robinson
4	Centre	Jayme Fressard
5	Wing	Meg Ward
6	Five-eighth	Raecene McGregor
7	Halfback	Tarryn Aiken
8	Prop	Millie Elliott
9	Hooker	Lauren Brown
16	Prop	Shannon Mato
11	Second-row	Amber Hall
12	Second-row	Tallisha Harden
7	Lock	Ali Brigginshaw (c)
10	Prop	Chelsea Lenarduzzi
14	Second-row	Annette Brander
15	Prop	Jessika Elliston
17	Hooker	Chante Temara
	Coach	Kelvin Wright

2025 Grand Final

Brisbane Broncos 22 defeated Sydney Roosters 18 at Accor Stadium on 5th October 2025.

Jersey	Position	Player
1	Fullback	Tamika Upton (c)
2	Wing	Kerri Johnson
3	Centre	Mele Hufanga
4	Centre	Julia Robinson
5	Wing	Hayley Maddick
6	Five-eighth	Gayle Broughton
7	Halfback	Ali Brigginshaw (c)
8	Prop	Annetta-Claudia Nu'uausala
14	Hooker	Destiny Brill
10	Prop	Brianna Clark
11	Second-row	Lauren Dam
12	Second-row	Romy Teitzel
13	Lock	Keilee Joseph
9	Hooker	Jada Ferguson
15	Prop	Chelsea Lenarduzzi
16	Centre	Shenae Ciesiolka
17	Prop	Shalom Sauaso
	Coach	Scott Prince

== Representative honours ==
=== National team representatives ===
Past and current players that have been selected to play for a national women's team and competed internationally.

Player	Club Debut	Country	International Debut	Years	Ref
Tarryn Aiken	15 Sep 2019	Australia	2 Nov 2022	2022	
Ngatokotoru Arakua	9 Sep 2018	New Zealand	**5 May 2017**	2018	
Chelsea Baker	9 Sep 2018	Australia	**6 May 2016**	2018	
Heather Ballinger	9 Sep 2018	Australia	**3 Sep 2011**	2018	
Annette Brander	15 Sep 2019	Australia	**9 Nov 2014**	2019-2020	
Brittany Breayley-Nati	9 Sep 2018	Australia	**9 Nov 2014**	2018	
Kimiora Breayley-Nati	9 Sep 2018	New Zealand	**16 Nov 2017**	2018	
Ali Brigginshaw	9 Sep 2018	Australia	**29 Sep 2009**	2018–2019, 2022–2025	
Destiny Brill	22 Jul 2023	Samoa	15 Oct 2023	2023–2025	
Gayle Broughton	22 Jul 2023	New Zealand	27 Oct 2024	2024	
Jaime Chapman	21 Aug 2022	Australia	6 Nov 2022	2022	
Shenae Ciesiolka	10 Oct 2020	Australia	2 Nov 2022	2022	
Brianna Clark	27 Aug 2022	New Zealand	2 Nov 2022	2022, 2024–2025	
Millie Elliott	15 Sep 2019	Australia	25 Oct 2019	2019	
Maitua Feterika	9 Sep 2018	New Zealand	**9 Nov 2014**	2018	
Teuila Fotu-Moala	9 Sep 2018	New Zealand	**9 Nov 2014**	2018	
Amber Hall	15 Sep 2019	New Zealand	**5 Jul 2013**	2019–2022	
Stephanie Hancock	9 Sep 2018	Australia	**Oct-Nov 2003**	2018	
Tallisha Harden	21 Sep 2018	Australia	**3 May 2015**	2022	
Mele Hufanga	22 Jul 2023	New Zealand	**6 Nov 2022**	2023–2025	
Keilee Joseph	27 Jul 2024	Australia	**6 Nov 2022**	2024–2025	
Chelsea Lenarduzzi	9 Sep 2018	Australia	25 Oct 2019	2019	
Nita Maynard-Perrin	21 Aug 2022	New Zealand	**16 Nov 2017**	2022	
Raecene McGregor	15 Sep 2019	New Zealand	**19 Nov 2017**	2019	
Roxy Murdoch	27 Feb 2022	New Zealand	25 Jun 2022	2022	
Annetta-Claudia Nu'uausala	10 Sep 2022	New Zealand	**6 May 2016**	2022	
Annetta-Claudia Nu'uausala	10 Sep 2022	Samoa	15 Oct 2023	2023–2025	
Julia Robinson	9 Sep 2018	Australia	13 Oct 2018	2018, 2022–2025	
Shalom Sauaso	5 Jul 2025	Samoa	19 Oct 2025	2025	
Jasmine Solia	21 Aug 2022	New Zealand	14 Oct 2023	2023	
Jasmine Solia	21 Aug 2022	Samoa	10 Nov 2024	2024	
Crystal Tamarua	21 Aug 2022	New Zealand	**5 May 2017**	2022	
Karley Te Kawa	14 Sep 2018	New Zealand	**10 Oct 2010**	2018	
Amy Turner	15 Sep 2019	New Zealand	25 Jun 2022	2022	
Tamika Upton	15 Sep 2019	Australia	14 Oct 2023	2025	

Notes:

- International Debut dates in **bold** indicate that the player made her first international appearance prior to playing for the Brisbane Broncos NRLW team.

==== Test Captains ====
Name	Team	Year(s)
Ali Brigginshaw	Australia	2018-19, 2022-2025
Tallisha Harden	Australia	2022

=== Women's State of Origin representatives ===
Past and current players that have played for Queensland and New South Wales in the State of Origin.

Player	State	Year(s)
Tarryn Aiken	Queensland	2020–2022
Chelsea Baker	Queensland	2018–2019
Heather Ballinger	Queensland	2018–2019
Emily Bass	Queensland	2022
Annette Brander	Queensland	2019–2020
Brittany Breayley-Nati	Queensland	2018
Ali Brigginshaw	Queensland	2018–2025
Destiny Brill	Queensland	2023–2025
Lauren Brown	Queensland	2020–2022
Shenae Ciesiolka	Queensland	2020–2025
Jessika Elliston	Queensland	2019
Jada Ferguson	Queensland	2025
Steph Hancock	Queensland	2018–2019
Tallisha Harden	Queensland	2018 , 2020– 2022
Keilee Joseph	Queensland	2024–2025
Kody House	Queensland	2018
Chelsea Lenarduzzi	Queensland	2019–2022, 2024–2025
Hayley Maddick	Queensland	2025
Shannon Mato	Queensland	2020
Amber Pilley	Queensland	2019
Tazmin Rapana	Queensland	2019, 2023–2024
Julia Robinson	Queensland	2020–2025
Romy Teitzel	Queensland	2023–2025
Tamika Upton	Queensland	2020–2022, 2025
Meg Ward	Queensland	2018–2019
Millie Elliott	New South Wales	2019–2022

=== Prime Minister's XIII representatives ===
Past and current players that have been selected to play in the Prime Minister's XIII.

Player	Year(s)
Jaime Chapman	2022
Jada Ferguson	2022

=== All-Stars Representatives ===
Past and current players that have played for the Indigenous All-Stars or for the Māori All-Stars.

==== Indigenous All Stars ====
Player	Year(s)
Kaitlyn Phillips	2023
Keilee Joseph	2024–2025

==== Māori All Stars (Māori people) ====
Player	Year(s)
Lavinia Gould	2022
Roxette Murdoch-Masila	2022
Amy Turner	2023
