= Meg Ward =

Australia international rugby league footballer (b.1994)

Personal information
- Born: 18 August 1994 (age 32) Gosford, New South Wales, Australia
- Height: 163 cm (5 ft 4 in)
- Weight: 71 kg (11 st 3 lb)

Playing information
- Position: Wing, Centre
Club
Years	Team	Pld	T	G	FG	P
2018–	Brisbane Broncos	10	3	18	0	48
Representative
Years	Team	Pld	T	G	FG	P
2017	Australia	4	4	0	0	16
2018–19	Queensland	2	0	0	0	0

Coaching information
Representative
Years	Team	Gms	W	D	L	W%
2025–	Tonga	2	1	0	1	50
- Source: RLP As of 16 November 2026

Meg Ward (born 18 August 1994) is a former Australian rugby league footballer who plays as a wing and centre for the Brisbane Broncos in the NRL Women's Premiership and the Valleys Diehards in the QRL Women's Premiership.

She is also the current head coach of Tonga.

She is an Australian and Queensland representative and has won three premierships with the Broncos.

She was assistant coach of Papua New Guinea at the 2021 Women's Rugby League World Cup, and is now head coach of Tonga

== Background ==
Born in Gosford, Ward moved to Brisbane when she was two years old.

Growing up, she played soccer and later rugby union. After joining the Australian Defence Force and moving to Darwin, she began playing rugby league for the Northern Sharks and Northern Territory Titans.

== Playing career ==
In 2017, Ward represented Australia at the 2017 Women's Rugby League World Cup, scoring three tries in the tournament.

=== 2018 ===
In June, Ward represented the ADF at the Women's National Championships. On 14 June, she joined the Brisbane Broncos NRL Women's Premiership team.

On 22 June, Ward made her debut for Queensland, starting at centre in a 10–16 loss to New South Wales.

In Round 1 of the 2018 NRL Women's season, she made her debut for the Broncos in a 30–4 win over the St George Illawarra Dragons. On 30 September, she started at centre in the Broncos 34–12 Grand Final win over the Sydney Roosters.

=== 2019 ===
In May, she represented the ADF at the Women's National Championships. On 21 June, she started on the wing for Queensland in their 4–14 loss to New South Wales.

On 6 October, she started on the wing and kicked five goals in the Broncos 30–6 Grand Final win over the Dragons. She finished the 2019 season as the Broncos leading point scorer with 14.

=== 2020 ===
On 25 October, Ward won her third NRLW premiership with the Broncos, kicking two goals in their 20–10 Grand Final win over the Roosters. She finished the season as the competition's top point scorer with 30.

=== 2021 ===
In 2021, Ward joined the Valleys Diehards in the QRL Women's Premiership.

== Coaching career ==
=== Tonga ===
She made her coaching debut for Tonga at the 2025 Rugby League Pacific Championships with a 24-42 defeat to Cook Islands on 25 October 2025.
