= Women's State of Origin =

Annual Australian rugby league series

- Current season or competition: 2026 Women's State of Origin
- Sport: Rugby league
- Instituted: 2018
- Inaugural season: 1999
- Number of teams: 2
- Country: Australia (ARLC)
- Shield Holders: New South Wales (2026)
- Website: NRL website
- Broadcast partner: Nine Network; Fox Sports
- Related competitions: NRL Women's Premiership; NSWRL Women's Premiership; QRL Women's Premiership

The Women's State of Origin is an annual rugby league fixture between two Australian state representative women's sides, the New South Wales Blues and the Queensland Maroons.

First played in 1999 as the Women's Interstate Challenge, the game was rebranded as State of Origin for the 2018 season. Queensland won the first game in 1999 and were unbeaten for 17 years until New South Wales won for the first time in 2016.

== History ==
=== Women's Interstate Challenge (1999–2017) ===
Despite women's rugby league first being played in Australia in 1921, the first official game between Queensland and New South Wales was not held until 1999. The two teams met at Brisbane's ANZ Stadium with Queensland winning 16–6.

Accurate records were not kept in the early years of the Interstate Challenge by either the QRL or the NSWRL, with many player records and game information still unknown. For many years, the women's teams were run by their own governing bodies, the Queensland Women's Rugby League and the New South Wales Women's rugby league, who were affiliated with the QRL and NSWRL.

Before coming under the State of Origin banner in 2018, the sides were not known as the 'Blues' and 'Maroons', with the Queensland side being known as the 'Brolgas'. In 2005, the teams began playing for the Nellie Doherty Cup. Nellie Doherty was a pioneer of the women's game in Australia, helping to launch the sport in 1921.

Although the majority of early Women's Interstate Challenges were one-off fixtures, the sides would occasionally play a series of games, such as in 2004 and 2008.

In 2015, Queensland failed to defeat New South Wales for the first time, with the sides drawing 4–all at Townsville's 1300SMILES Stadium and Queensland retaining the Nellie Doherty Cup. On 23 July 2016, New South Wales defeated Queensland for the first time, ending Queensland's 17-year undefeated streak, with an 8–4 victory at the Gold Coast's Cbus Super Stadium. On 23 July 2017, in the final game played under the Women's Interstate Challenge name, New South Wales defeated Queensland for the second time, winning 22–6 at WIN Stadium in Wollongong.

=== State of Origin (2018–present) ===
On 6 December 2017, the National Rugby League announced that the Women's Interstate Challenge would be rebranded as the Women's State of Origin. The game which, was previously played as a curtain-raiser, would now be a standalone fixture broadcast on the Nine Network and Fox Sports. With the game under the State of Origin banner, the Nellie Doherty Cup was replaced by a shield, with the player of the match now receiving the Nellie Doherty Medal.

On 22 June 2018, New South Wales won the first Women's State of Origin game, defeating Queensland 16–10 at North Sydney Oval. Blues' centre Isabelle Kelly, who scored two tries in the win, won the inaugural Nellie Doherty Medal. On 21 June 2019, New South Wales defeated Queensland for the fourth consecutive year, winning 14–4 at North Sydney Oval, with Blues halfback Maddie Studdon being awarded the Nellie Doherty Medal.

The 2020 game was originally due to be played in June at Sunshine Coast Stadium, but was moved to the post-season for the first time, due to the COVID-19 pandemic. The game was played in Queensland for the first time under the State of Origin banner and for the first time overall since 2016. Queensland defeated New South Wales 24–18, winning their first official State of Origin game and their first game since 2014.

The 2021 match is historically notable for being the first Women's State of Origin fixture where the players, coaches and on-field officials were all women.

== Broadcasting ==
Within Australia, the game is simulcast on the Nine Network and Fox Sports.

In 2013 and 2014, the game was livestreamed. In 2015 and 2016, the game aired on Fox Sports as a replay the day after the game. In 2017, the game aired live on Fox Sports for the first time.

== Selection rules ==
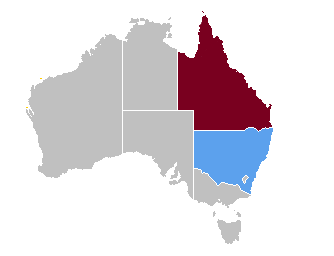

Prior to 2019, the Queensland and New South Wales teams were largely selected under residency rules, meaning a number of players represented both states. For example, Tahnee Norris (who captained Queensland) and Natalie Dwyer, both represented New South Wales before moving to Queensland. Innisfail's Tarah Westera represented Queensland before moving to Penrith, where she represented New South Wales, later returning to and playing for Queensland.

In 2019, the eligibility rules were revised to be more inline with the men's State of Origin rules. The residency rule was removed, which saw New Zealand representatives Maitua Feterika (Queensland) and Nita Maynard (New South Wales) ruled ineligible. Queensland lock Rona Peters, who had previously represented New Zealand, was also originally ruled ineligible. This was later overturned and she was given special dispensation, as she had retired from international rugby league in 2015, before she first represented Queensland in 2016.

== Player of the series ==
The player of the series is awarded the Katrina Fanning Medal. In 2026, the National Rugby League announced that the award would be renamed after the 2024 Hall of Fame inductee, Katrina Fanning, replacing the Nellie Doherty Medal which had been awarded since 2018. The Nellie Doherty Medal was first awarded to New South Wales' centre Isabelle Kelly after the first official Women's State of Origin game in 2018 and Kelly became the first player to win the award twice winning it again in 2022

Recipients
Year	Player	State	Position	Club	Ref.
2018	Isabelle Kelly	New South Wales	Centre	CRL Newcastle	
2019	Maddie Studdon	New South Wales	Halfback	Cronulla-Sutherland Sharks	
2020	Tarryn Aiken	Queensland	Five-eighth	Brisbane Broncos	
2021	Tazmin Gray	Queensland	Second-row	Burleigh Bears	
2022	Isabelle Kelly	New South Wales	Centre	Sydney Roosters	
2023	Tazmin Gray	Queensland	Second-row	Brisbane Broncos	
2024	Shannon Mato	Queensland	Prop	Gold Coast Titans	
2025	Olivia Kernick	New South Wales	Lock	Sydney Roosters	
2026	Yasmin Meakes	New South Wales	Second-row	Newcastle Knights	

== Results ==
Accurate records were not kept in early years of the Women's Interstate Challenge by either the QRL or the NSWRL. In 2004, 2008 and 2023 two games were played instead of a one-off fixture. The competition was played as a three-game series for the first time in 2024.

Year	Winner	Margin	Matches (Note: score of winning team given first, D = Draw, N = New South Wales win, Q = Queensland win)			Ref
Year	Winner	Margin	Game 1	Game 2	Game 3	Ref
1999	Queensland	1–0	Q 18–16	—N/a		
2000	Queensland	1–0	Q ?–?	—N/a		
2001	Queensland	1–0	Q 34–14	—N/a		
2002	Queensland	1–0	Q 26–16	—N/a		
2003	Queensland	1–0	Q ?–?	—N/a		
2004	Queensland	2–0	Q 40–8	Q 46–8	—N/a	
2005	Queensland	1–0	Q 20–18	—N/a		
2006	Queensland	1–0	Q 40–24	—N/a		
2007	Queensland	1–0	Q 38–16	—N/a		
2008	Queensland	2–0	Q 8–6	Q 46–4	—N/a	
2009	Queensland	1–0	Q 20–14	—N/a		
2010	Queensland	1–0	Q 36–6	—N/a		
2011	Queensland	1–0	Q 26–0	—N/a		
2012	Queensland	1–0	Q 34–10	—N/a		
2013	Queensland	1–0	Q 30–12	—N/a		
2014	Queensland	1–0	Q 26–10	—N/a		
2015	Draw	0–0	D 4–4	—N/a		
2016	New South Wales	1–0	N 8–4	—N/a		
2017	New South Wales	1–0	N 22–6	—N/a		
2018	New South Wales	1–0	N 16–10	—N/a		
2019	New South Wales	1–0	N 14–4	—N/a		
2020	Queensland	1–0	Q 24–18	—N/a		
2021	Queensland	1–0	Q 8–6	—N/a		
2022	New South Wales	1–0	N 20–14	—N/a		
2023	Queensland	1–1	Q 18–10	N 18–14	—N/a	(Note: series was decided by points aggregate)
2024	Queensland	2–1	N 22–12	Q 11–10	Q 22–6	
2025	New South Wales	2–1	N 32–12	N 26–6	Q 18–14	
2026	New South Wales	3–0	N 11–6	N 14–10	N 12–4	

== Under-19s ==
In 2019, a Women's Under 18s match was played as a curtain-raiser to the Women's State of Origin match. It was won 24–4 by New South Wales. In 2021, the first Women's Under 19s State of Origin match was played.

Year	Winner	Score	Report
2021	New South Wales	16–12	
2022	New South Wales	22–6	
2023	Queensland	20–14	
2024	New South Wales	46–4	
2025	New South Wales	26–10	
2026	Queensland	22–18	

== See also ==
- NRL Women's Premiership
- NSWRL Women's Premiership
- QRL Women's Premiership
- State of Origin series
- Rugby league in Australia
- Australian regional rivals – NSW vs. QLD
