= Tarryn Aiken =

Australia international rugby league footballer (born 1999)

Personal information
- Born: 14 July 1999 (age 27) Gosford, New South Wales, Australia
- Height: 167 cm (5 ft 6 in)
- Weight: 61 kg (9 st 8 lb)

Playing information
- Position: Five-eighth, Halfback
Club
Years	Team	Pld	T	G	FG	P
2019–22	Brisbane Broncos	19	6	1	0	26
2023–	Sydney Roosters	37	8	6	1	85
	Total	56	14	7	1	111
Representative
Years	Team	Pld	T	G	FG	P
2019	Australia 9s	2	0	0	0	0
2020–25	Queensland	11	4	0	0	16
2022–	Australia	11	6	1	0	26
- Source: RLP As of 16 November 2026

Tarryn Aiken (born 14 July 1999) is an Australian rugby league footballer who plays as a five-eighth for the Sydney Roosters in the NRL Women's Premiership and the Tweed Heads Seagulls in the QRL Women's Premiership.

She is an Australian 9s and Queensland representative, despite being born and raised in New South Wales.

== Background ==
Born in Gosford, New South Wales, Aiken played junior rugby football league for the Wyong Roos before moving to Tweed Heads, New South Wales and playing for Bilambil Jets until Under 12's.

== Playing career ==
=== 2019 ===
As an Australian touch football representative, Aiken joined the Tweed Heads Seagulls in 2019 and later that year she represented South East Queensland at the NRL Women's National Championship. In June 2019, Aiken signed with the Brisbane Broncos NRL Women's Premiership side.

In Round 1 of the 2019 NRL Women's Premiership, Aiken made her debut for the Broncos in a 14–4 win over the St George Illawarra Dragons. On 6 October 2019, she came off the bench in the Broncos' 30–6 Grand Final win over the Dragons.

In October 2019, she represented Australia at the World Cup 9s tournament. On 2 December 2019, she was named in the Queensland Performance Program squad in preparation for the 2020 State of Origin game.

=== 2020 ===
On 25 October 2020, Aiken started at halfback in the Broncos' 20–10 NRLW Grand Final win over the Sydney Roosters.

On 13 November, Aiken made her State of Origin debut for Queensland, starting at five-eighth and scoring a try in their 24–18 win over New South Wales. Following the game, she was awarded the Nellie Doherty Medal for Player of the Match. On 27 November, she won the Broncos' Players' Player Award for the 2020 season.

=== 2022 ===
In late September, Aiken was named in the Dream Team announced by the Rugby League Players Association. The team was selected by the players, who each cast one vote for each position.

=== 2024 ===
In December 2024, Aiken was named as the winner of the women's IRL Golden Boot Award.

== Achievements and accolades ==
=== Individual ===
- Nellie Doherty Medal: 2020
- Brisbane Broncos Players' Player: 2020
- Karyn Murphy Medal: 2024, 2026
- IRL Golden Boot Award: 2024

=== Team ===
- 2019 NRLW Grand Final: Brisbane Broncos – Winners
- 2020 NRLW Grand Final: Brisbane Broncos – Winners
- 2024 NRLW Grand Final: Sydney Roosters – Winners
- 2026 NRLW Grand Final: Sydney Roosters – Winners

=== Representative ===
- Rugby League World Cup Champion: 2026
