= 2020 NRL Women's season =

2020 NRL Telstra Women's Premiership
- Duration: 3 October to 25 October, 2020
- Teams: 4
- Premiers: Brisbane Broncos (3rd Title)
- Minor premiers: Brisbane Broncos (3rd title)
- Matches played: 7
- Points scored: 222
- Broadcast partners: Channel Nine; Fox League; Sky Sport (NZ); Sky Sports (UK)
- Top points scorer(s): Meg Ward (30)
- Dally M Award: Ali Brigginshaw
- Top try-scorer(s): Tamika Upton (5)

The 2020 NRL Women's Premiership was the third season of professional women's rugby league in Australia.

== Teams ==
Club	Season	Head coach	Captain(s)	Ref
Brisbane Broncos	3rd season	Kelvin Wright	Ali Brigginshaw (4)	
New Zealand Warriors	3rd season	Brad Donald	Georgia Hale (3)	
St. George Illawarra Dragons	3rd season	Daniel Lacey	Sam Bremner (3) and Kezie Apps (2)	
Sydney Roosters	3rd season	Jamie Feeney	Corban McGregor (4)	

Notes:

- In the Captain(s) column
  - The number next to the name indicates the number of games played as captain
  - The word and indicates joint captains. The Dragons employed joint captains, but one of the pair missed their Round 3 match.
  - The solo captains of the other three clubs played in all their club's matches.

== Regular season ==
The season operated under a round-robin format, with games played as curtain-raisers to the 2020 NRL Finals Series. The top two finishing teams then contested the Grand Final, which was played before the men's Grand Final on 25 October.

== Ladder ==
2020 NRL Women's season
Pos	Team	Pld	W	D	L	PF	PA	PD	Pts
1	Brisbane Broncos	3	3	0	0	70	34	+36	6
2	Sydney Roosters	3	2	0	1	56	40	+16	4
3	New Zealand Warriors	3	1	0	2	48	60	−12	2
4	St. George Illawarra Dragons	3	0	0	3	18	58	−40	0

=== Ladder progression ===
- Numbers highlighted in green indicate that the team finished the round inside the top two.
- Numbers highlighted in blue indicates the team finished first on the ladder in that round.
- Numbers highlighted in red indicates the team finished last place on the ladder in that round.

	Team	1	2	3
1	Brisbane Broncos	2	4	6
2	Sydney Roosters	2	4	4
3	New Zealand Warriors	0	0	2
4	St. George Illawarra Dragons	0	0	0

== Grand Final ==
Sunday, 25 October
4:05 pm (AEDT)

Brisbane Broncos	20 – 10	Sydney Roosters
Tries: Tamika Upton (3') 1 Amber Hall (8') 1 Chelsea Lenarduzzi (34') 1 Tallisha Harden (44') 1 Goals: Meg Ward 2/4 (5', 9')	1st: 12 – 10; 2nd: 8 – 0	Tries: 1 (13') Yasmin Meakes; 1 (25') Quincy Dodd; Goals: 1/2 Zahara Temara (26')

ANZ Stadium
Referee: Belinda Sharpe
Player of the Match: Amber Hall (Karyn Murphy Medal)

== Individual awards ==
=== Dally M Medal Awards Night ===
The following awards were presented at the Dally M Medal Awards ceremony in Sydney on the night of 19 October 2020.

Dally M Medal Player of the Year: Ali Brigginshaw ( Brisbane Broncos)

Rookie of the Year: Kennedy Cherrington ( Sydney Roosters)

Try of the Year: Madison Bartlett for New Zealand Warriors versus St. George Illawarra Dragons (17 October 2020). Footage of this try is available within the article and as the 3rd try of the game in the match highlights.

Tackle of the Year: Hannah Southwell for Sydney Roosters versus New Zealand Warriors (10 October 2020). Footage of this tackle is available within the article and within the match highlights.

=== Grand Final Day Awards ===
The following awards were presented at ANZ Stadium on Grand Final day, 25 October 2020.

Veronica White Medal: Georgia Hale ( New Zealand Warriors).

Karyn Murphy Medal Player of the Match: Amber Hall ( Brisbane Broncos)

=== Statistical Awards ===
Highest Point Scorer in Regular Season: Meg Ward ( Brisbane Broncos) 26 (1t 11g)

Top Try Scorers in Regular Season: Tamika Upton ( Brisbane Broncos) 4.

Highest Point Scorer across the Full Season: Meg Ward ( Brisbane Broncos) 30 (1t 13g)

Top Try Scorer across the Full Season: Tamika Upton ( Brisbane Broncos) 5
