= Chelsea Lenarduzzi =

Australia international rugby league footballer (born 1995)

Personal information
- Born: 26 November 1995 (age 30) Bowral, New South Wales, Australia
- Height: 178 cm (5 ft 10 in)
- Weight: 95 kg (14 st 13 lb)

Playing information
- Position: Prop, Lock
Club
Years	Team	Pld	T	G	FG	P
2018–	Brisbane Broncos	69	22	0	0	88
Representative
Years	Team	Pld	T	G	FG	P
2017–26	Queensland	9	1	0	0	4
2019	Australia	1	0	0	0	0
- Source: RLP As of 22 November 2026

Chelsea Lenarduzzi (born 26 November 1995) is an Australian rugby league footballer who plays for the Brisbane Broncos in the NRL Women's Premiership and the Burleigh Bears in the QRL Women's Premiership.

An Australian and Queensland representative, she has won four premierships with the Broncos.

== Background ==
Born in Bowral, New South Wales and raised in Moss Vale, She attended Chevalier College. Lenarduzzi moved to the Gold Coast, Queensland in 2015 to attend university, where she began playing rugby league for the Burleigh Bears. In 2015, 2016 and 2018, she won Australian national titles in shotput.

Lenarduzzi's older brother, Rhys, is an Italian rugby league representative.

== Playing career ==
In 2017, Lenarduzzi made her debut for Queensland in their 6–22 loss to New South Wales.

In 2018, while playing for the Burleigh Bears, Lenarduzzi represented South East Queensland at the Women's National Championships. On 21 June 2018, she signed with the Brisbane Broncos NRL Women's Premiership team.

In Round 1 of the 2018 NRL Women's season, she made her debut for the Broncos in their 30–4 win over the St George Illawarra Dragons. On 30 September 2018, she started at prop in the Broncos' Grand Final win over the Sydney Roosters.

In 2019, she represented South East Queensland at the Women's National Championships and was selected for Queensland in the Women's State of Origin. On 6 October 2019, she came off the bench and scored a try in the Broncos' 30–6 Grand Final win over the St George Illawarra Dragons. On 25 October 2019, she made her Test debut for Australia in their 28–8 win over New Zealand at WIN Stadium.

On 25 October 2020, she won her third NRLW premiership with the Broncos, scoring a try in their 20–10 Grand Final win over the Sydney Roosters.

In 2023, she entered the 6th season with the Brisbane Broncos. She played all 10 games, including their semifinal loss against the eventual premiers, Newcastle Knights, of the 2023 NRLW campaign, picking up three tries. One of the main leaders of the Brisbane pack, she averaged 125 metres a game.

2025 saw Lenarduzzi earn a recall to the Queensland side for State of Origin II in Sydney, which Queensland lost 6-26. In game three at McDonald Jones Stadium, Newcastle, Lenarduzzi scored the match winning try to help Queensland avoid a clean sweep, winning 18-14.

Lenarduzzi played a role in the Broncos qualifying for their first NRLW Grand Final in five years, as the take on fellow NRLW heavyweight the Sydney Roosters.
