= 2021 New South Wales Rugby League season =

The New South Wales Rugby League administered several competitions during the 2021 rugby league season in Australia. The season was impacted by the Delta variant of the COVID-19 pandemic. Junior competitions, Country representative tournaments, and City versus Country representative matches were concluded prior to the impact of lockdown in June 2021. The lockdowns, however, led to the postponement and subsequent cancellation of senior competitions.

== Knock on Effect New South Wales Cup ==
2021 Knock on Effect New South Wales Cup
- Duration: 12 March – 26 September 2021
- Teams: 11
- Broadcast partners: Fox League

The 2021 season of the Knock on Effect New South Wales Cup was curtailed due to lockdowns introduced to combat the Delta variant of the COVID-19 pandemic in New South Wales. Fifteen of a scheduled 24 rounds were played, with the last completed round of matches occurring on the weekend of 19–20 June 2021.

=== Teams ===
There will be 11 teams in 2021.

Colours	Club	Home ground(s)	Head coach
	Blacktown Workers Sea Eagles	Lottoland, HE Laybutt Field	Matt Ballin
	Canberra Raiders	GIO Stadium, Raiders Belconnen	N/A
	Mount Pritchard Mounties	Aubrey Keech Reserve, Stadium Australia	Michael Potter
	Newcastle Knights	McDonald Jones Stadium	Andrew Ryan
	Newtown Jets	Henson Park	Greg Matterson
	North Sydney Bears	North Sydney Oval	Jason Taylor
	Parramatta Eels	Bankwest Stadium	Ryan Carr
	Penrith Panthers	BlueBet Stadium	Peter Wallace
	South Sydney Rabbitohs	Metricon High Performance Centre, Stadium Australia	N/A
	St. George Illawarra Dragons	WIN Stadium, Netstrata Jubilee Stadium	N/A
	Western Suburbs Magpies	Lidcombe Oval	Ben Gardiner

=== Ladder ===
The table below reflects the competition ladder at the completion of Round 15. This was the last completed round played, and occurred on the weekend of the 19–20 June 2021. During July and early August 2021, when there was a hope that the competition could be resumed in late August and September, scheduled matches were cancelled, with the result recorded as a nil-all draw. A Round 2 match between Blacktown Workers Sea Eagles and South Sydney Rabbitohs was postponed due to wet weather. As the rescheduled date was 28 July 2021 this match was not played.

Pos	Team	Pld	W	D	L	PF	PA	PD	Pts
1	Penrith Panthers	13	12	0	1	417	192	+225	28
2	Parramatta Eels	13	9	0	4	367	270	+97	22
3	Western Suburbs Magpies	14	9	1	4	422	294	+128	21
4	North Sydney Bears	13	7	1	5	282	299	−17	19
5	Newcastle Knights	13	6	1	6	290	313	−23	17
6	Mount Pritchard Mounties	13	6	0	7	286	282	+4	16
7	Newtown Jets	12	4	1	7	250	320	−70	15
8	Canberra Raiders	13	5	0	8	302	308	−6	14
9	St. George Illawarra Dragons	13	4	0	9	258	358	−100	12
10	Blacktown Workers Sea Eagles	12	4	0	8	254	368	−114	12
11	South Sydney Rabbitohs	11	2	0	9	226	350	−124	10

Updated to match(es) played on 21 June 2021. Source: NSWRL website
Rules for classification: 1) points; 2) point difference; 3) points scored

==== Finals series ====
Due to the cancellation of the competition, a final Series was not held for the 2021 Knock on Effect New South Wales Cup.

== President's Cup ==
=== Northern Conference (Denton Engineering Cup) ===
==== Ladder ====
The competition was affected by the expanding impact of the COVID-19 pandemic in New South Wales. From Round 13, lockdown restrictions applying to the Central Coast prevented the scheduled matches of The Entrance Tigers, Wyong Roos, and for several rounds Lakes United Seagulls, from taking place. After Round 17, lockdown restrictions were extended to Newcastle and the Hunter and the final round, Round 18, was not played.

Pos	Team	Coach	M	W	D	CD	L	PF	PA	PD	Pts
1	Maitland Pickers	Matt Lantry	15	13	1	2	1	526	156	370	29
2	Cessnock Goannas	Todd Edwards	14	10	0	3	4	366	285	81	23
3	Central Newcastle Butcher Boys	Phil Williams	16	10	0	1	6	320	298	22	21
4	Macquarie Scorpions	Steve Kidd	16	9	1	1	6	414	279	135	20
5	Western Suburbs Rosellas	Todd Lowrie	14	8	0	3	6	262	200	62	19
6	Wyong Roos	Mitch Williams	12	5	0	5	7	204	267	-63	15
7	The Entrance Tigers	Shane Wooden	12	4	0	5	8	217	276	-59	13
8	Lakes United Seagulls	Robbie Payne	14	5	0	3	9	220	408	-188	13
9	Kurri Kurri Bulldogs	Mitch Cullen	16	4	0	1	12	236	431	-195	9
10	South Newcastle Lions	Matt Kennedy	15	3	0	2	12	220	385	-165	8

Notes:

- In the above table CD refers to Covid Draw. Each team was assigned one point, per a normal draw.
- Two Round 1 matches were postponed due grounds being affected by wet weather.
  - The postponed Maitland Pickers—Kurri Kurri Bulldogs match was played on Sunday, 27 June 2021.
  - The Lakes United Seagulls—Western Suburbs Rosellas that had been postponed was assigned as a Covid Draw.

==== Finals series ====
Due to the cancellation of the competition, a final Series was not held for the 2021 Denton Engineering Cup.

=== Central Conference (Ron Massey Cup) ===
==== Ladder ====
The table below reflects the matches played prior to the cessation of the competition.

Pos	Team	Coach	Pld	W	D	L	B	PF	PA	PD	Pts
1	St Marys Saints	Shane Elford	12	11	0	1	1	490	124	366	24
2	Hills District Bulls		13	10	0	3	1	344	217	127	22
3	Mounties		13	8	0	5	1	301	276	25	18
4	Wentworthville Magpies	Brett Cook	12	7	0	5	1	318	252	66	16
5	Kaiviti Silktails	Wes Naiqama	13	6	1	6	1	334	327	7	15
6	Glebe Dirty Reds		12	5	2	5	1	370	290	80	14
7	Windsor Wolves	Chris Yates	13	5	1	7	1	291	380	-89	13
8	Blacktown Workers Sea Eagles		12	4	1	7	2	250	346	-96	13
9	Western Suburbs Magpies		11	4	0	7	2	228	348	-120	12
10	Ryde-Eastwood Hawks		12	4	1	7	1	248	376	-128	11
11	Cabramatta Two Blues		11	0	0	11	2	126	364	-238	4

Notes:

- The competition was suspended in early July and subsequently cancelled.
- Round 2 was postponed following to the closure of venues due to wet weather. Two of the five matches were played prior to the lockdown.
  - Kaiviti Silktails defeated Blacktown Workers Sea Eagles on Thursday, 24 June 2021.
  - Windsor Wolves defeated Mounties on Saturday, 26 June 2021.
  - Hills District Bulls had the bye in Round 2.
- Round 10 marked the City-Country representative weekend. No Ron Massey Cup teams played.
- Rounds 16 (3-4 July) to 21 (7-8 Aug) were cancelled. The scheduled matches in these Rounds were designated as a nil-all Cover Draw whilst there was a hope that the competition could be resumed.
- Rounds 22 and 23 were abandoned.

==== Finals series ====
Due to the cancellation of the competition, a final Series was not held for the 2021 Ron Massey Cup.

=== Southern Conference (Mojo Homes Illawarra Cup) ===
==== Ladder ====
The ladder below reflects the 9 out of scheduled 15 rounds that were completed prior to the suspension and subsequent cancellation of the competition. The table below reflects the matches played prior to the cessation of the competition.

Pos	Team	Coach	Pld	W	D	L	B	PF	PA	PD	Pts
1	Thirroul Butchers	Jarrod Costello	8	7	0	1	1	200	100	100	16
2	Collegians Red Dogs	Nathan Fien	7	5	0	2	2	242	133	109	14
3	Western Suburbs Red Devils	Peter McLeod	7	4	0	3	2	216	122	94	12
4	Corrimal Cougars	Sean Maloney	7	2	0	5	2	110	206	-96	8
5	Dapto Canaries	Chris Leikvoll & Adam Blake	7	0	0	7	2	91	298	-207	4

Notes

- Originally scheduled for 8 May 2021, Round 5 was washed out and postponed until 24 July 2021, however, due to the lockdown the round was not played.

==== Finals series ====
Due to the cancellation of the competition, a final Series was not held for the 2021 Mojo Homes Illawarra Cup.

=== President's Cup ===
Due to the cancellation of NSWRL major competitions in August, the planned four-team knock-out series for the 2021 President's Cup was not held. The plan was to include the three major premiers from the Northern (Newcastle, Hunter and Central Coast), Central (Ron Massey Cup) and Southern (Illawarra) Conferences, along with a wild card entry.

== Major NSWRL Competitions ==
=== Jersey Flegg Cup ===
==== Ladder ====
The table below reflects the matches played prior to the cessation of the competition.

Pos	U21s Team	Coach	Pld	W	D	L	B	PF	PA	PD	Pts
1	Wests Tigers	Wayne Lambkin	12	8	4	0	2	354	214	140	24
2	St. George Illawarra Dragons	Willie Talau	12	9	0	3	2	253	248	5	22
3	Penrith Panthers	Ben Harden	12	6	2	4	2	305	237	68	18
4	Canterbury-Bankstown Bulldogs	Luke Vella	13	7	1	5	1	316	261	55	17
5	South Sydney Rabbitohs	Joe O'Callaghan	12	5	1	6	2	257	264	-7	15
6	Cronulla-Sutherland Sharks	Andrew Dallalana	13	5	2	6	1	232	235	-3	14
7	Sydney Roosters	Anthony Barnes	13	5	2	6	1	308	316	-8	14
8	Parramatta Eels	Dean Feeney	12	3	1	8	2	238	290	-52	11
9	Manly Warringah Sea Eagles	Trevor Ott	12	3	1	8	2	203	308	-105	11
10	Victoria Thunderbolts		13	1	6	6	1	254	347	-93	10

Notes:

- The competition was suspended in early July and subsequently cancelled.
- Four of five Round 2 matches originally scheduled for 20 & 21 March 2021 were postponed following to the closure of venues due to wet weather.
  - Cronulla-Sutherland Sharks beat Victoria Thunderbolts on Sunday, 21 March 2021.
  - Penrith Panthers beat Canterbury-Bankstown Bulldogs on Saturday, 27 March 2021.
  - Wests Tigers drew with Sydney Roosters on Friday, 14 May 2021.
  - St. George Illawarra Dragons beat Parramatta Eels on Saturday, 15 May 2021.
  - Manly Warringah Sea Eagles beat South Sydney Rabbitohs on Saturday, 12 June 2021.
- Round 10 (15 & 16 May) marked the City-Country representative weekend. Only the two postponed Jersey Flegg matches were played.
- Rounds 16 (3-4 July) to 21 (7-8 Aug) were cancelled. The scheduled matches in these Rounds were designated as a nil-all Cover Draw whilst there was a hope that the competition could be resumed.
- Rounds 22, 23 and 24 were abandoned.

==== Finals series ====
Due to the cancellation of the competition, a final Series was not held for the 2021 Jersey Flegg Cup.

=== Harvey Norman NSW Women's Premiership ===
==== Ladder ====
Pos	Team	Pld	W	D	L	PF	PA	PD	Pts
1	Central Coast Roosters	11	11	0	0	432	70	+362	26
2	Mount Pritchard Mounties	11	10	0	1	489	88	+401	24
3	Cronulla-Sutherland Sharks	11	9	0	2	420	84	+336	22
4	Helensburgh Tigers	11	7	0	4	286	198	+88	18
5	St Marys Saints	11	6	0	5	277	188	+89	16
6	Wests Tigers	11	6	0	5	300	220	+80	16
7	North Sydney Bears	11	6	0	5	268	199	+69	16
8	South Sydney Rabbitohs	12	4	0	8	186	278	−92	10
9	Wentworthville Magpies	11	1	0	10	104	374	−270	6
10	Glebe Dirty Reds	11	1	0	10	80	510	−430	6
11	Cabramatta Two Blues	11	0	0	11	18	651	−633	4

Updated to match(es) played on 5 April. Source:
Rules for classification: 1) points; 2) point difference; 3) points scored

==== Finals series ====
The competition was suspended during the week that preceded the planned first week of a three-week, six team final series. Subsequently, in August, the 2021 Harvey Norman NSW Women's Premiership competition was cancelled.

=== Sydney Shield ===
==== Ladder ====
The table below reflects the matches played prior to the cessation of the competition.

Pos	Team	Coach	Pld	W	D	L	B	PF	PA	PD	Pts
1	St Marys Saints	Shane Rodney	12	11	0	1	1	528	184	344	24
2	Hills District Bulls		13	11	0	2	1	440	226	214	24
3	Brothers Penrith		12	9	1	2	2	380	252	128	23
4	Cronulla Caringbah Sharks		13	8	0	5	1	332	326	6	18
5	Moorebank Rams		12	6	1	5	1	359	364	-5	15
6	Wentworthville Magpies		12	5	2	5	1	260	300	-40	14
7	East Campbelltown Eagles		11	3	0	8	2	268	355	-87	10
8	Ryde-Eastwood Hawks		12	4	0	8	1	272	379	-107	10
9	Belrose Eagles		13	3	1	9	1	268	378	-110	9
10	Windsor Wolves		12	3	1	8	1	263	394	-131	9
11	Cabramatta Two Blues		12	1	0	11	2	218	430	-212	6

Notes:

- The competition was suspended in early July and subsequently cancelled.
- Round 2 was postponed following to the closure of venues due to wet weather. Two of the five matches were played prior to the lockdown.
  - Brothers Penrith defeated Belrose Eagles on Sunday, 16 May 2021.
  - Cronulla Caringbah Sharks defeated Cabramatta Two Blues on Saturday, 26 June 2021.
  - Hills District Bulls had the bye in Round 2.
- Round 10 marked the City-Country representative weekend. No Sydney Shield teams played.
- Rounds 16 (3-4 July) to 21 (7-8 Aug) were cancelled. The scheduled matches in these Rounds were designated as a nil-all Cover Draw whilst there was a hope that the competition could be resumed.
- Rounds 22 and 23 were abandoned.

==== Finals series ====
Due to the cancellation of the competition a final Series was not held for the 2021 Sydney Shield.

=== NSW Men's Country Championships ===
The 2021 Men's Country Championship was won by Monaro Colts.

==== Northern Conference Ladder ====
Pos	Team	Pld	W	D	L	PF	PA	PD	Pts
1	Central Coast Roosters	2	2	0	0	51	32	+19	4
2	Northern Rivers Titans	2	1	0	1	42	41	+1	2
3	Northern Tigers	2	1	0	1	42	50	−8	2
4	Newcastle-Maitland Knights	2	0	0	2	30	62	−32	0
5	North Coast Bulldogs	2	0	0	2	28	80	−52	0

Updated to match(es) played on 13 March. Source:
Rules for classification: 1) points; 2) point difference; 3) points scored

==== Southern Conference Ladder ====
Pos	Team	Pld	W	D	L	PF	PA	PD	Pts
1	Riverina Bulls	2	2	0	0	60	40	+20	4
2	Monaro Colts	2	2	0	0	56	36	+20	4
3	Illawarra-South Coast Dragons	2	1	0	1	66	40	+26	2
4	Western Rams	2	1	0	1	52	26	+26	2
5	Macarthur Wests Tigers	2	0	0	2	48	68	−20	0

Updated to match(es) played on 13 March. Source:
Rules for classification: 1) points; 2) point difference; 3) points scored

==== Finals series ====
Semi-finals
N1	Central Coast	10
S2	Monaro	18
S1	Riverina	16
S3	South Coast-Illawarra	24

Grand Final
Monaro	18
South Coast-Illawarra	16

Home	Score	Away	Match Information
Home	Score	Away	Date and Time	Venue	Referee
Semi-finals
Central Coast Roosters	10 – 18	Monaro Colts	Sunday, 21 March, 12:10pm	Seiffert Oval	TBD
Riverina Bulls	16 – 24	Illawarra-South Coast Dragons	Sunday, 21 March, 2:00pm	Seiffert Oval	Braiden McIntosh
Grand Final
Monaro Colts	18 – 16	Illawarra-South Coast Dragons	Saturday, 27 March, 2:30pm	HE Laybutt Field	Braiden McIntosh

=== NSW Women's Country Championships ===
==== Northern Conference Ladder ====
Pos	Team	Pld	W	D	L	PF	PA	PD	Pts
1	Newcastle-Maitland Knights	2	2	0	0	66	6	+60	4
2	North Coast Bulldogs	2	2	0	0	22	12	+10	4
3	Central Coast Roosters	2	1	0	1	36	16	+20	2
4	Northern Tigers	2	0	0	2	12	48	−36	0
5	Northern Rivers Titans	2	0	0	2	12	68	−56	0

Updated to match(es) played on 13 March. Source:
Rules for classification: 1) points; 2) point difference; 3) points scored

==== Southern Conference Ladder ====
Pos	Team	Pld	W	D	L	PF	PA	PD	Pts
1	Riverina Bulls	2	2	0	0	44	18	+26	4
2	Monaro Colts	2	1	1	0	42	24	+18	3
3	Western Rams	2	1	1	0	34	24	+10	3
4	Illawarra-South Coast Dragons	2	0	0	2	10	32	−22	0
5	Macarthur Wests Tigers	2	0	0	2	24	54	−30	0

Updated to match(es) played on 13 March. Source:
Rules for classification: 1) points; 2) point difference; 3) points scored

==== Finals series ====
Semi-finals
N1	Newcastle-Maitland	26
N2	North Coast	12
S1	Riverina	12
S2	Monaro	8

Grand Final
Riverina
Newcastle-Maitland

Home	Score	Away	Match Information
Home	Score	Away	Date and Time	Venue	Referee
Semi-finals
Riverina Bulls	12 – 8	Monaro Colts	Sunday, 21 March, 11:00am	Seiffert Oval	TBD
Newcastle-Maitland Knights	26 – 12	North Coast Bulldogs	Sunday, 18 April, 11:00am	Jack Neal Oval	TBD
Grand Final
Riverina Bulls	V	Newcastle-Maitland Knights	Saturday, 18 May, TBA	TBA	TBD

== NSWRL Junior Reps ==
=== SG Ball Cup ===
The 2021 S.G. Ball Cup competition was won by the Canberra Raiders. The Raiders' lock forward, Trey Mooney, was named Player of the Match. Illawarra's five-eighth, Junior Amone, was named Player of the Series.

==== Ladder ====
Pos	Team	Pld	W	D	L	PF	PA	PD	Pts
1	Sydney Roosters U19s	8	7	0	1	248	140	+108	16
2	Manly Warringah Sea Eagles U19s	8	6	1	1	288	126	+162	15
3	South Sydney Rabbitohs U19s	8	6	1	1	278	148	+130	15
4	Canberra Raiders U19s	8	6	0	2	292	171	+121	14
5	Canterbury-Bankstown Bulldogs U19s	8	5	2	1	214	158	+56	14
6	Illawarra Steelers U19s	8	5	1	2	272	160	+112	13
7	Parramatta Eels U19s	8	5	1	2	247	186	+61	13
8	Cronulla-Sutherland Sharks U19s	8	4	0	4	248	198	+50	10
9	Balmain Tigers U19s	8	3	1	4	210	214	−4	9
10	Penrith Panthers U19s	8	3	0	5	190	226	−36	8
11	Newcastle Knights U19s	8	2	1	5	204	230	−26	7
12	Western Suburbs Magpies U19s	8	1	0	7	144	226	−82	4
13	Victoria Thunderbolts U19s	8	1	2	5	170	262	−92	4
14	St George Dragons U19s	8	1	0	7	122	352	−230	4
15	North Sydney Bears U19s	8	0	0	8	80	410	−330	2

Updated to match(es) played on 10 April. Source:
Rules for classification: 1) points; 2) point difference; 3) points scored

==== Finals series ====
Elimination Finals
3	South Sydney	14
6	Illawarra	46
4	Canberra	44
5	Canterbury-Bankstown	10

Semi-finals
1	Sydney	32
6	Illawarra	42
2	Manly Warringah	18
4	Canberra	20

Grand Final
4	Canberra	18
6	Illawarra	14

Home	Score	Away	Match Information
Home	Score	Away	Date and Time	Venue	Referee
Elimination Finals
South Sydney Rabbitohs U19s	14 – 46	Illawarra Steelers U19s	Saturday, 17 April, 2:30pm	Leichhardt Oval	Brandon Mani
Canberra Raiders U19s	44 – 10	Canterbury-Bankstown Bulldogs U19s	Saturday, 17 April, 2:30pm	HE Laybutt Field	Michael Ford
Semi-finals
Sydney Roosters U19s	32 – 42	Illawarra Steelers U19s	Saturday, 24 April, 2:30pm	HE Laybutt Field	Brandon Mani
Manly Warringah Sea Eagles U19s	18 – 20	Canberra Raiders U19s	Saturday, 24 April, 2:30pm	Leichhardt Oval	Michael Ford
Grand Final
Canberra Raiders U19s	18 – 14	Illawarra Steelers U19s	Saturday, 1 May, 3.00pm	Leichhardt Oval	Brendan Mani

=== Harold Matthews Cup ===
The 2021 Harold Matthews competition was won by Manly-Warringah. The Sea Eagles' five-eighth, Latu Fainu, was named both Player of the Match and Player of the Series.

==== Ladder ====
Pos	Team	Pld	W	D	L	PF	PA	PD	Pts
1	Manly Warringah Sea Eagles U17s	8	8	0	0	250	88	+162	18
2	Parramatta Eels U17s	8	7	0	1	212	92	+120	16
3	Penrith Panthers U17s	8	6	0	2	182	124	+58	14
4	Western Suburbs Magpies U17s	8	6	0	2	194	138	+56	14
5	Central Coast Roosters U17s	8	5	0	3	184	116	+68	12
6	Sydney Roosters U17s	8	5	0	3	194	142	+52	12
7	Newcastle Knights U17s	8	5	0	3	158	164	−6	12
8	Illawarra Steelers U17s	8	3	1	4	202	186	+16	9
9	Canterbury-Bankstown Bulldogs U17s	8	3	0	5	148	96	+52	8
10	North Sydney Bears U17s	8	3	0	5	166	212	−46	8
11	Balmain Tigers U17s	8	3	0	5	128	198	−70	8
12	Cronulla-Sutherland Sharks U17s	8	2	1	5	142	188	−46	7
13	St George Dragons U17s	8	2	0	6	122	198	−76	6
14	South Sydney Rabbitohs U17s	8	1	0	7	88	248	−160	4
15	Canberra Raiders U17s	8	0	0	8	70	250	−180	2

Updated to match(es) played on 10 April. Source:
Rules for classification: 1) points; 2) point difference; 3) points scored

==== Finals series ====
Elimination Finals
4	Western Suburbs	18
5	Central Coast	16
3	Penrith	36
6	Sydney	24

Semi-finals
1	Manly Warringah	32
4	Western Suburbs	12
2	Parramatta	14
3	Penrith	6

Grand Final
1	Manly Warringah	24
2	Parramatta	12

Home	Score	Away	Match Information
Home	Score	Away	Date and Time	Venue	Referee
Elimination Finals
Penrith Panthers U17s	36 – 24	Sydney Roosters U17s	Saturday, 17 April, 12:45pm	Leichhardt Oval	Adam Sirianni
Western Suburbs Magpies U17s	18 – 16	Central Coast Roosters U17s	Saturday, 17 April, 12:45pm	HE Laybutt Field	Blake Williams
Semi-finals
Parramatta Eels U17s	14 – 6	Penrith Panthers U17s	Saturday, 24 April, 11:00am	HE Laybutt Field	Adam Sirianni
Manly Warringah Sea Eagles U17s	32 – 12	Western Suburbs Magpies U17s	Saturday, 24 April, 12:45pm	Leichhardt Oval	Blake Williams
Grand Final
Manly Warringah Sea Eagles U17s	24 – 12	Parramatta Eels U17s	Saturday, 1 May, 1:00pm	Leichhardt Oval	Michael Ford

=== Tarsha Gale Cup ===
The 2021 Tarsha Gale Cup competition was won by St George. The Dragons' half-back, Rayven-Jodeci Boyce, was named Player of the Match. The Dragons' prop forward, Fatafehi Hanisi, was named Player of the Series.

Pos	Team	Pld	W	D	L	PF	PA	PD	Pts
1	Newcastle Knights U19s Girls	8	7	0	1	204	64	+140	16
2	Illawarra Steelers U19s Girls	8	6	0	2	196	115	+81	14
3	Roosters Indigenous Academy U19s Girls	8	5	0	3	184	110	+74	12
4	Wests Tigers U19s Girls	8	5	0	3	145	150	−5	12
5	St George Dragons U19s Girls	8	4	1	3	194	116	+78	11
6	Cronulla-Sutherland Sharks U19s Girls	8	3	0	5	88	172	−84	8
7	Parramatta Eels U19s Girls	8	2	1	5	96	226	−130	7
8	Canberra Raiders U19s Girls	8	1	2	5	128	170	−42	6
9	Canterbury-Bankstown Bulldogs U19s Girls	8	1	0	7	96	208	−112	4

Updated to match(es) played on 10 April. Source:
Rules for classification: 1) points; 2) point difference; 3) points scored

==== Finals series ====
Elimination Finals
4	Wests	8
5	St George	30
3	Sydney	20
6	Cronulla-Sutherland	0

Semi-finals
1	Newcastle	10
5	St George	26
2	Illawarra	4
3	Sydney	22

Grand Final
3	Sydney	4
5	St George	30

Home	Score	Away	Match Information
Home	Score	Away	Date and Time	Venue	Referee
Elimination Finals
Sydney Roosters U19s Girls	20 – 0	Cronulla-Sutherland Sharks U19s Girls	Saturday, 17 April, 11:00am	Leichhardt Oval	Benjamin Seppala
Wests Tigers U19s Girls	8 – 30	St George Dragons U19s Girls	Saturday, 17 April, 11:00am	HE Laybutt Field	Mitchell Pitscheider
Semi-finals
Newcastle Knights U19s Girls	10 – 26	St George Dragons U19s Girls	Saturday, 24 April, 11:00am	Leichhardt Oval	Mitchell Pitscheider
Illawarra Steelers U19s Girls	4 – 22	Sydney Roosters U19s Girls	Saturday, 24 April, 12:45pm	HE Laybutt Field	Benjamin Seppala
Grand Final
Sydney Roosters U19s Girls	4 – 30	St George Dragons U19s Girls	Saturday, 1 May, 11.00am	Leichhardt Oval	Blake Williams

=== Laurie Daley Cup ===
The 2021 Laurie Daley Cup was won by the Central Coast Roosters. The Roosters' hooker, Tyler Moriarty, was named Player of the Match.

==== Northern Conference Ladder ====
Pos	Team	Pld	W	D	L	PF	PA	PD	Pts
1	Central Coast Roosters U18s	5	5	0	0	130	56	+74	10
2	Northern Tigers U18s	5	3	0	2	100	102	−2	6
3	North Coast Bulldogs U18s	5	2	0	3	100	108	−8	4
4	Northern Rivers Titans U18s	5	1	0	4	88	108	−20	2
5	Newcastle-Maitland Knights U18s	5	1	0	4	66	98	−32	2

Updated to match(es) played on 13 March. Source:
Rules for classification: 1) points; 2) point difference; 3) points scored

==== Southern Conference Ladder ====
Pos	Team	Pld	W	D	L	PF	PA	PD	Pts
1	Western Rams U18s	5	4	1	0	170	64	+106	9
2	Monaro Colts U18s	5	4	1	0	138	86	+52	9
3	Illawarra-South Coast Dragons U18s	5	2	0	3	112	96	+16	4
4	Macarthur Wests Tigers U18s	5	1	0	4	68	142	−74	2
5	Riverina Bulls U18s	5	1	0	4	70	182	−112	2

Updated to match(es) played on 13 March. Source:
Rules for classification: 1) points; 2) point difference; 3) points scored

==== Finals series ====
Semi-finals
N1	Central Coast	12
S2	Monaro	6
N2	Northern	16
S2	Western	10

Grand Final
Central Coast	24
Northern	14

Home	Score	Away	Match Information
Home	Score	Away	Date and Time	Venue	Referee
Semi-finals
Central Coast Roosters U18s	12 – 6	Monaro Colts U18s	Saturday, 20 March, 2:00pm	HE Laybutt Field	TBD
Northern Tigers U18s	16 – 10	Western Rams U18s	Sunday, 21 March, 11:00am	Waratah Park	Ryan Micallef
Grand Final
Central Coast Roosters U18s	24 – 14	Northern Tigers U18s	Saturday, 27 March, 12:40pm	HE Laybutt Field	Ryan Micallef

=== Andrew Johns Cup ===
The 2021 Andrew Johns Cup competition was won by Central Coast Roosters' captain, James Miller, was named Player of the Match.

==== Northern Conference Ladder ====
Pos	Team	Pld	W	D	L	PF	PA	PD	Pts
1	Central Coast Roosters U16s	5	5	0	0	104	48	+56	10
2	North Coast Bulldogs U16s	5	3	0	2	110	70	+40	6
3	Northern Rivers Titans U16s	5	2	0	3	72	88	−16	4
4	Newcastle-Maitland Knights U16s	5	1	0	4	38	96	−58	2
5	Northern Tigers U16s	5	0	0	5	60	128	−68	0

Updated to match(es) played on 13 March. Source:
Rules for classification: 1) points; 2) point difference; 3) points scored

==== Southern Conference Ladder ====
Pos	Team	Pld	W	D	L	PF	PA	PD	Pts
1	Illawarra-South Coast Dragons U16s	5	5	0	0	106	64	+42	10
2	Monaro Colts U16s	5	4	0	1	98	50	+48	8
3	Macarthur Wests Tigers U16s	5	3	0	2	120	94	+26	6
4	Western Rams U16s	5	2	0	3	66	102	−36	4
5	Riverina Bulls U16s	5	0	0	5	70	104	−34	0

Updated to match(es) played on 13 March. Source:
Rules for classification: 1) points; 2) point difference; 3) points scored

==== Finals series ====
Semi-finals
N1	Central Coast	18
S2	Monaro	0
S1	Illawarra-South Coast	22
N2	North Coast	0

Grand Final
Central Coast	14
Illawarra-South Coast	2

Home	Score	Away	Match Information
Home	Score	Away	Date and Time	Venue	Referee
Semi-finals
Illawarra-South Coast Dragons U16s	22 – 0	North Coast Bulldogs U16s	Saturday, 20 March, 11:00am	HE Laybutt Field	TBD
Central Coast Roosters U16s	18 – 0	Monaro Colts U16s	Saturday, 20 March, 12:20pm	HE Laybutt Field	Bailey Warren
Grand Final
Central Coast Roosters U16s	14 – 2	Illawarra-South Coast Dragons U16s	Saturday, 27 March, 11:00am	HE Laybutt Field	TBD

== City versus Country ==
The New South Wales Rugby League conducted a representative programme on the weekend of 15–16 May 2021. This included City versus Country matches in five categories: Wheelchair, Under 16s, Under 18s, Women's (Origin, Open Age), Physical Disability and Men's (Representative, Open Age). In addition, the programme included two matches between Newcastle and Illawarra representative teams – in Under 20s and Open Age categories.

=== Women's Origin ===
The City-Country Origin Women's match was played on Saturday, 15 May 2021 at Bankwest Stadium.
The following players were selected in the City Origin Women's team. The team was coached by Lisa Fiaola ( North Sydney Bears).

No.	Pos.	Player	Age	2021 NSWRL State Club	2020 NRLW Club
1	Fullback	Botille Vette-Welsh	25	Wests Tigers	Sydney Roosters
2	Winger	Jocephy Daniels		Mounties	Yet to play NRLW
3	Centre	Jessica Sergis	24	Helensburgh Tigers	St. George Illawarra Dragons
4	Centre	Tiana Penitani	26	Cronulla Sharks	St. George Illawarra Dragons
5	Winger	Shanice Parker	33	North Sydney Bears	Sydney Roosters
6	Five-Eighth	Corban McGregor	28	Cronulla-Sutherland Sharks	Sydney Roosters
7	Halfback	Maddison Studdon	27	Cronulla Sharks	St. George Illawarra Dragons
8	Prop	Filomina Hanisi	21	Mounties	Sydney Roosters
9	Hooker	Quincy Dodd	22	Cronulla-Sutherland Sharks	Sydney Roosters
10	Prop	Kennedy Cherrington	23	Cronulla-Sutherland Sharks	Sydney Roosters
11	Second Row	Sarah Togatuki	24	St Marys Saints	Sydney Roosters
12	Second Row	Talei Holmes	22	Cronulla-Sutherland Sharks	St. George Illawarra Dragons
13	Lock	Simaima Taufa	28	Mounties	Sydney Roosters
14	Interchange	Renee Target		North Sydney Bears	Yet to play NRLW
15	Interchange	Stephanie Ball	21	Mounties	New Zealand Warriors
16	Interchange	Aliti Namoce Sagano	24	North Sydney Bears	2019 Sydney Roosters
17	Interchange	Shirley Mailangi		South Sydney Rabbitohs	Yet to play NRLW
18	Interchange	Taina Naividi		Mounties	Yet to play NRLW

The following players were selected in the Country Origin Women's team. The team was coached by Adam Bezzina.

No.	Pos.	Player	Age	2021 NSWRL State Club	2020 NRLW Club
1	Fullback	Brydie Parker	22	Central Coast Roosters	Sydney Roosters
2	Winger	Jasmin Strange		Central Coast Roosters	Yet to play NRLW
3	Centre	Yasmin Meakes	28	Central Coast Roosters	Sydney Roosters
4	Centre	Jayme Fressard	24	Central Coast Roosters	Brisbane Broncos
5	Winger	Tess Staines		Riverina Bulls	Yet to play NRLW
6	Five-Eighth	Jocelyn Kelleher	22	Central Coast Roosters	Sydney Roosters
7	Halfback	Rachael Pearson		Helensburgh Tigers	Yet to play NRLW
8	Prop	Samantha Economos	28	St Marys Saints	New Zealand Warriors
9	Hooker	Keeley Davis	21	Mounties	St. George Illawarra Dragons
10	Prop	Caitlan Johnston	21	Central Coast Roosters	2019 Sydney Roosters
11	Second Row	Kezie Apps	31	Helensburgh Tigers	St. George Illawarra Dragons
12	Second Row	Holli Wheeler	32	North Sydney	St. George Illawarra Dragons
13	Lock	Hannah Southwell	23	Central Coast Roosters	Sydney Roosters
14	Interchange	Matilda Power		Mounties	Yet to play NRLW
15	Interchange	Jade Etherden	27	Mounties	St. George Illawarra Dragons
16	Interchange	Ellie Johnston	21	South Sydney	St. George Illawarra Dragons
17	Interchange	Tayla Predebon		Central Coast Roosters	Yet to play NRLW
18	Interchange	Sophie Gaynor		Riverina Bulls	Yet to play NRLW

==== Match details ====
Saturday, 15 May 2021.
2.30pm (AET)

City Women's Origin	40 — 16	Country Women's Origin
Tries: 9 Jessica Sergis 3 Brydie Parker 2 Jocephy Daniels 2 Tiana Penitani; Corban Baxter; Goals: 2 Maddie Studdon 2/9	HT: 24 – 4 Reports	Tries: 3 Jocelyn Kelleher; Tayla Predebon; Rachael Pearson; Goals: 2 Rachael Pearson 2/3

BankWest Stadium, Parramatta
Referee: Cameron Turner
Player of the Match: Jessica Sergis

=== Men's Open Age ===
The following players were selected, from Ron Massey Cup clubs, into the City Men's Open Age team. The team was coached by Brett Cook.

No.	Pos.	Player	Club
1	Fullback	Jake Toby	St Marys Saints
2	Winger	Lorenzo Mulitalo	Hills District Bulls
3	Centre	Leva Li	Hills District Bulls
4	Centre	Semisi Kioa	Ryde-Eastwood Hawks
5	Winger	Eli Roberts	Glebe Dirty Reds
6	Five-Eighth	Kamren Cryer	Mounties
7	Halfback	Zac Greene	St Marys Saints
8	Prop	Danny Fualalo	Cabramatta Two Blues
9	Hooker	Soni Luke	St Marys Saints
10	Prop	Anton Iaria	St Marys Saints
11	Second Row	Kane McQuiggin	Mounties
12	Second Row	Matt Stimson	St Marys Saints
13	Lock	Alec Susino	St Marys Saints
14	Interchange	Kieran Hayman	Wentworthville Magpies
15	Interchange	Caleb Uele	Glebe Dirty Reds
16	Interchange	Jack Miller	Mounties
17	Interchange	Niko Apelu	Wentworthville Magpies
18	Interchange	Toni Tupouniua	Blacktown Workers Sea Eagles

The following players were selected in the Country Origin Men's team. The team was coached by Beau Scott.

No.	Pos.	Player	Club	Region
1	Fullback	Dane O'Hehir	Gundagai Tigers	Riverina Bulls
2	Winger	Hamish Oxley	Oakdale Workers Bears	Macarthur Wests Tigers
3	Centre	Cody Hodge	Southcity Bulls	Riverina Bulls
4	Centre	Ryan James	Shellharbour Sharks	Illawarra South Coast Dragons
5	Winger	Chanse Perham	Stingrays of Shellharbour	Illawarra South Coast Dragons
6	Five-Eighth	Cameron Davies	Erina Eagles	Central Coast Roosters
7	Halfback	Cameron Vazzoler	Warilla-Lake South Gorillas	Illawarra South Coast Dragons
8	Prop	Jake Goodwin	West Wyalong Mallee Men	Riverina Bulls
9	Hooker	Joshua Mitchell	Queanbeyan Blues	Monaro Colts
10	Prop	Bradley Prior	Woden Valley Rams	Monaro Colts
11	Second Row	Ron Leapai	Tumut Blues	Riverina Bulls
12	Second Row	Corey Mulhall	Gerringong Lions	Illawarra South Coast Dragons
13	Lock	Brendan Newcombe	Kincumber Colts	Central Coast Roosters
14	Interchange	Sam Clune	Albion Park-Oak Flats Eagles	Illawarra South Coast Dragons
15	Interchange	Zachary Masters	Tumut Blues	Riverina Bulls
16	Interchange	William Wardle	Thirlmere-Tahmoor Roosters	Macarthur Wests Tigers
17	Interchange	Atunaisa Tupou	Queanbeyan Blues	Monaro Colts
18	Interchange	Allan Shipley	Thirlmere-Tahmoor Roosters	Macarthur Wests Tigers

==== Match details ====
16 May 2021
12:40 PM

City Origin	38 – 12	Country Origin
Tries: 7 Jake Toby 2 Danny Fualalo; Zac Greene; Semisi Kioa; Kane McQuiggin; Kieran Hayman; Goals: 5 Zac Greene 5	Report	Tries: 2 Chanse Perham; Jake Goodwin; Goals: 2 Hamish Oxley 2

Collegians Sporting Complex,
Wollongong, New South Wales
Referee: Daniel Luttringer
Player of the Match: Soni Luke

== Women's State of Origin ==
On 25 May 2021, the NSWRL announced a 19-player squad for their fixture against Queensland on 25 June 2021 at Sunshine Coast Stadium.
The table below includes appearances and points scored in the 2021 match.

Pos.	Player	Date of birth (age)	Caps	Pts	2020 NRLW Club	2021 NSWRL Club
Fullback	Botille Vette-Welsh	13 September 1996 (age 29)	3	4	Sydney Roosters	Wests Tigers
Wing	Yasmin Meakes	25 March 1994 (age 32)	2	0	Sydney Roosters	Central Coast Roosters
Centre	Jessica Sergis	15 September 1997 (age 28)	4	16	St. George Illawarra Dragons	Helensburgh Tigers
Centre	Isabelle Kelly	20 September 1996 (age 29)	7	16	St. George Illawarra Dragons	Central Coast Roosters
Wing	Tiana Penitani	12 January 1996 (age 30)	3	4	St. George Illawarra Dragons	Cronulla-Sutherland Sharks
Five-eighth	Corban Baxter	10 April 1996 (age 30)	7	4	Sydney Roosters	Cronulla-Sutherland Sharks
Halfback	Maddie Studdon	16 October 1994 (age 31)	7	18	St. George Illawarra Dragons	Cronulla-Sutherland Sharks
Prop	Simaima Taufa	28 April 1994 (age 31)	8	4	Sydney Roosters	Mounties
Hooker	Keeley Davis	5 July 2000 (age 25)	1	0	St. George Illawarra Dragons	Mounties
Prop	Millie Boyle	19 May 1998 (age 27)	3	0	Brisbane Broncos	Burleigh Bears
Second-row	Kezie Apps	4 February 1991 (age 35)	8	8	St. George Illawarra Dragons	Helensburgh Tigers
Second-row	Sarah Togatuki	14 October 1997 (age 28)	2	0	Sydney Roosters	St Matys Saints
Lock	Hannah Southwell	4 March 1999 (age 27)	4	0	Sydney Roosters	Central Coast Roosters
Hooker	Quincy Dodd	13 April 2000 (age 26)	2	0	Sydney Roosters	Cronulla-Sutherland Sharks
Prop	Filomina Hanisi	9 March 2001 (age 25)	2	4	Sydney Roosters	Mounties
Prop	Kennedy Cherrington	5 January 1999 (age 27)	1	0	Sydney Roosters	Cronulla-Sutherland Sharks
Second-row	Holli Wheeler	28 January 1990 (age 36)	3	0	2019 St George Illawarra	North Sydney Bears
Centre	Brydie Parker	25 October 1999 (age 26)	0	0	Sydney Roosters	Central Coast Roosters
interchange	Renee Targett		0	0	Yet to play NRLW	North Sydney Bears

Notes:

- Brydie Parker and Renee Targett did not play in the match.
- Players to subsequently change NRLW clubs in the delayed 2021 season (played February to April 2022) were:
  - Parramatta Eels: Kennedy Cherrington, Filomina Hanisi, Tiana Penitani, Maddie Studdon, Simaima Taufa, and Botille Vette-Welsh.
  - St. George Illawarra Dragons: Keeley Davis and Renee Targett (making her NRLW debut).
  - Sydney Roosters: Isabelle Kelly, Jessica Sergis.
