= 2024 NRL Women's season =

Australian women's rugby league season

NRL Telstra Women's Premiership
- Duration: 11 weeks (9 rounds; SF, GF); 25 July - 6 October
- Teams: 10
- Premiers: Sydney Roosters (2nd title)
- Minor premiers: Brisbane Broncos (5th title)
- Highest attendance: 40,623 (Grand Final)
- Broadcast partners: Nine Network; Fox League; Sky Sport (NZ); Sky Sports (UK)
- Wooden spoon: Wests Tigers (1st spoon)
- Dally M Medal: Olivia Kernick
- Top point-scorer(s): Jocelyn Kelleher 78
- Top try-scorer(s): Sheridan Gallagher 9 Tiana Penitani 9 Julia Robinson 9

The 2024 NRL Women's season is the seventh professional season of the NRL Women's Premiership. The number of teams (ten), start date (25 July 2024) and duration of the season (eleven weeks) was confirmed by the NRL, with the release of the draw on 13 November 2023. Possible expansion in the number of teams for 2024 had been discussed by the Australian Rugby League Commission during October 2023.

== Teams ==
The ten teams that participated in the 2023 season returned for the 2024 season.

Club	Season	Home ground(s)	Head coach	Captain(s)	Ref
Brisbane Broncos	7th season	Suncorp Stadium and Totally Workwear Stadium	Scott Prince	Ali Brigginshaw (10)	
Canberra Raiders	2nd season	GIO Stadium	Darrin Borthwick	Simaima Taufa (8) and Zahara Temara (9)	
Cronulla Sharks	2nd season	PointsBet Stadium	Tony Herman	Tiana Penitani (11)	
Gold Coast Titans	4th season	Cbus Super Stadium	Karyn Murphy	Georgia Hale (9)	
Newcastle Knights	4th season	McDonald Jones Stadium	Ben Jeffries	Hannah Southwell (10) and Tamika Upton (10)	
North Queensland Cowboys	2nd season	Queensland Country Bank Stadium	Ricky Henry	Kirra Dibb (9) and Tallisha Harden (9)	
Parramatta Eels	4th season	CommBank Stadium and Eric Tweedale Stadium	Steve Georgallis	Mahalia Murphy (9)	
St. George Illawarra Dragons	7th season	WIN Stadium and Netstrata Jubilee Stadium	Jamie Soward	Raecene McGregor (9)	
Sydney Roosters	7th season	Allianz Stadium and Industree Group Stadium	John Strange	Isabelle Kelly (11)	
Wests Tigers	2nd season	Leichhardt Oval and Campbelltown Sports Stadium	Brett Kimmorley	Kezie Apps (3) and Botille Vette-Welsh (9)	

Notes:

- In late August 2023 the NRL asked the seven other clubs for expressions of interest in joining an expanded NRLW competition. Although expansion in the 2024 season is unlikely, it has not been ruled out by the NRL.
- The release of the 2024 NRLW draw on 13 November 2023 confirmed that the number of teams would remain at ten for 2024.
- In the Captain(s) column
  - The number next to the name indicates the number of games played as captain
  - The word and indicates joint captains. Of the four clubs that employed joint captains, for two both captains appeared in all their matches. In the other two clubs, the Raiders and Wests Tigers, only one of pair played in every game.
  - At the six clubs with a single captain, those captains played in all their clubs' matches.
- New head coach appointments were
  - Steve Georgallis (Eels) announced on 22 November 2023, in a dual role as their NRLW coach and Coaching Director of the Club’s Elite Pathways program. The preceding (and inaugural) Eels coach, Dean Widders had announced his resignation in late September 2023.
  - Ben Jeffries (Knights) on 10 January 2024, on a three-year contract. Jeffries had coached the North Queensland Cowboys in the 2023 NRLW season. Previously, on 2 November 2023, the Knights had announced that Ronald Griffiths, their NRLW coach for the 2022 and 2023 premiership-winning seasons, had been appointed to coach their NSW Cup team in 2024.
  - Ricky Henry (Cowboys on 19 February 2024, on a three-year contract.
- Prior to the conclusion of their season, the Dragons announced that they would not be renewing the coaching contact of Jamie Soward.

== Scheduling ==
Ten teams will play each other once across nine rounds, followed by a two-week final series involving the top four teams. First place on the ladder plays fourth-place and second-place plays third-place in semi-finals, with the winners meeting in the Grand Final.

The start, duration, and conclusion of the 2024 season was influenced by several factors.

- A three-match Women's State of Origin series on 16 May, 6 June, and 27 June. All three matches were played on a Thursday night.
- A seven-week preparation period.
- Two weeks of leave.
- An All Stars match on 16 February 2024.
- The State Competitions.
  - Several articles reported a proposal to move the State Competitions from being run early in the season, prior to the NRLW season, to instead be run in at the same time as the NRLW season.
  - The purpose of aligning the competitions to run in parallel would be:
    - To cater for players who don't initially make the NRLW playing 18 at their club, by providing them with a high-standard secondary competition; and
    - Ensuring players brought into the NRLW squads to cover injuries are match-fit.
  - An AAP article on 10 November 2023 reported that the New South Wales state competition would likely move, but the Queensland Women's Premiership would not. This was subsequently confirmed by the Queensland Rugby League and New South Wales Rugby League.
    - The QRL Women's Premiership — ran for 9 rounds and a two-week (top-four) Finals Series, from 2 March to 25 May 2024.
    - The NSWRL Women's Premiership — was scheduled for 11 rounds running from 6 July to 16 September 2024, to be followed by a two-week (top-four) Finals Series.

== Trial matches ==
On 12 June 2024, the Canberra Raiders announced a trial match against the Newcastle Knights. On 18 June 2024, the Brisbane Broncos announced a trial match against the Wests Tigers. On 3 July 2024, the NRL announced remaining trial fixtures.

Home	Score	Away	Match information					
Home	Score	Away	Date and time	Format	Venue	Referees	Attendance	Reports
Canberra Raiders	8–28	Newcastle Knights	Saturday 6 July 2024; 2:00 PM	Juniors; NRLW	McDonalds Park, Wagga Wagga	Isaac Cornell		
Parramatta Eels	20–8	St. George Illawarra Dragons	Saturday 13 July 2024; 1:00 PM	HNWP; NRLW	Eric Tweedale Stadium			
Brisbane Broncos	28–16	Wests Tigers	Saturday 13 July 2024; 5:15 PM	NRLW; NRL	Suncorp Stadium			
North Queensland Cowboys	28–12	Gold Coast Titans	Sunday 14 July 2024; 11:00 AM	NRLW (Only)	Southern Suburbs Rugby League Grounds, Cairns			
Cronulla-Sutherland Sharks	20–20	Sydney Roosters	Sunday 14 July 2024; 1:30 PM	HNWP; NRLW	PointsBet Stadium			

== Regular season ==
The first announcement of the 2024 NRLW season's fixtures was released by the NRL on 13 November 2023.

=== Ladder ===
Pos	Team	Pld	W	D	L	PF	PA	PD	Pts	Qualification
1	Brisbane Broncos (M)	9	7	0	2	272	156	+116	14	Advance to finals series
2	Sydney Roosters (P)	9	7	0	2	222	112	+110	14	Advance to finals series
3	Newcastle Knights	9	6	0	3	238	132	+106	12	Advance to finals series
4	Cronulla-Sutherland Sharks	9	6	0	3	146	122	+24	12	Advance to finals series
5	Parramatta Eels	9	5	0	4	160	184	−24	10	
6	North Queensland Cowboys	9	4	0	5	137	218	−81	8	
7	Canberra Raiders	9	3	0	6	194	216	−22	6	
8	Gold Coast Titans	9	3	0	6	128	191	−63	6	
9	St. George Illawarra Dragons	9	2	0	7	178	234	−56	4	
10	Wests Tigers	9	2	0	7	108	218	−110	4	

Source: National Rugby League
(M) Minor premiers; (P) Premiers

==== Ladder progression ====
- Numbers highlighted in green indicate that the team finished the round inside the top four.
- Numbers highlighted in blue indicates the team finished first on the ladder in that round.
- Numbers highlighted in red indicates the team finished last place on the ladder in that round.

	Team	1	2	3	4	5	6	7	8	9
1	Brisbane Broncos	0	0	2	4	6	8	10	12	14
2	Sydney Roosters	0	2	4	6	6	8	10	12	14
3	Newcastle Knights	2	4	4	4	6	8	8	10	12
4	Cronulla-Sutherland Sharks	2	4	6	8	10	12	12	12	12
5	Parramatta Eels	2	2	4	6	6	6	8	10	10
6	North Queensland Cowboys	0	2	2	4	6	6	8	8	8
7	Canberra Raiders	2	2	2	2	2	2	4	4	6
8	Gold Coast Titans	2	4	4	4	6	6	6	6	6
9	St George Illawarra Dragons	0	0	2	2	2	4	4	4	4
10	Wests Tigers	0	0	0	0	0	0	0	2	4

=== Round 1 ===
Home	Score	Away	Match information					
Home	Score	Away	Date and time	Format	Venue	Referees	Attendance	Reports
Newcastle Knights	12–10	Sydney Roosters	Thursday 25 July; 7:45 PM	NRLW (Only)	McDonald Jones Stadium	Belinda Sharpe	3,921	
Cronulla-Sutherland Sharks	14–0	North Queensland Cowboys	Saturday 27 July; 11:05 AM	NRLW (Only)	PointsBet Stadium	Damian Brady	1,257	
Brisbane Broncos	10–22	Parramatta Eels	Saturday 27 July; 12:45 PM	NRLW; NRL	Suncorp Stadium	Rochelle Tamarua	10,382	
St. George Illawarra Dragons	10–18	Gold Coast Titans	Sunday 28 July; 12:00 PM	NRLW; NRL	WIN Stadium	Daniel Luttringer	10,728	
Wests Tigers	12–32	Canberra Raiders	Sunday 28 July; 1:45 PM	HNWP; NRLW	Campbelltown Sports Ground	Karra-Lee Nolan	1,506	

Note: Attendance at Suncorp Stadium was NRLW 10,382 and NRL 42,213. Attendance at WIN Stadium was NRLW 10,728 (per League Unlimited) and NRL 18,988.

=== Round 2 ===
Home	Score	Away	Match information					
Home	Score	Away	Date and time	Format	Venue	Referees	Attendance	Reports
Canberra Raiders	20–26	Newcastle Knights	Saturday 3 August; 11:05 AM	NRLW; HNWP	GIO Stadium	Daniel Luttringer	1,791	
Gold Coast Titans	28–12	Wests Tigers	Saturday 3 August; 12:45 PM	NRLW; NRL	Cbus Super Stadium	Nick Pelgrave	11,105	
Parramatta Eels	16–18	Cronulla-Sutherland Sharks	Sunday 4 August; 12:00 PM	NRLW; NRLW	Allianz Stadium	Luke Saldern	1,166	
Sydney Roosters	28–12	Brisbane Broncos	Sunday 4 August; 1:45 PM	NRLW; NRLW	Allianz Stadium	Belinda Sharpe	2,899	
North Queensland Cowboys	38–34	St. George Illawarra Dragons	Sunday 4 August; 6:10 PM	NRLW (Only)	Queensland Country Bank Stadium	Karra-Lee Nolan	2,427	

Note: Attendance at Cbus Super Stadium was NRLW 11,105 (versus Wests Tigers) and NRL 25,278 (versus Brisbane Broncos).

=== Round 3 ===
Home	Score	Away	Match information					
Home	Score	Away	Date and time	Format	Venue	Referees	Attendance	Reports
Sydney Roosters	20–4	Wests Tigers	Saturday 10 August; 11:05 AM	NRLW; HNWP	Industree Group Stadium	Karra-Lee Nolan	1,898	
Canberra Raiders	12–24	Cronulla-Sutherland Sharks	Saturday 10 August; 12:45 PM	NRLW; NRL	GIO Stadium	Kasey Badger	5,831	
North Queensland Cowboys	6–20	Parramatta Eels	Sunday 11 August; 12:00 PM	NRLW; NRLW	Totally Workwear Stadium	Daniel Luttringer	1,393	
Brisbane Broncos	44–4	Gold Coast Titans	Sunday 11 August; 1:45 PM	NRLW; NRLW	Totally Workwear Stadium	Nick Pelgrave	1,788	
Newcastle Knights	10–18	St. George Illawarra Dragons	Sunday 11 August; 6:10 PM	NRL; NRLW	McDonald Jones Stadium	Luke Saldern	9,479	

Note: Attendance at GIO Stadium was NRLW 5,831 (versus Cronulla-Sutherland Sharks) and NRL 16,690 (versus Manly-Warringah Sea Eagles). Attendance at McDonald Jones Stadium was NRL 22,813 (versus Wests Tigers) and, after a portion of the crowd had left the venue, an estimated NRLW 9,479 (versus St. George Illawarra Dragons).

=== Round 4 ===
Home	Score	Away	Match information					
Home	Score	Away	Date and time	Format	Venue	Referees	Attendance	Reports
Brisbane Broncos	28–22	Canberra Raiders	Saturday 17 August; 11:05 AM	NRLW (Only)	Totally Workwear Stadium	Clayton Wills		
North Queensland Cowboys	11–10	Gold Coast Titans	Saturday 17 August; 12:45 PM	NRLW; Gap; NRL	Queensland Country Bank Stadium	Nick Morel	1,458	
St. George Illawarra Dragons	8–28	Sydney Roosters	Sunday 18 August; 12:00 PM	NRLW; NRL	WIN Stadium	Luke Saldern		
Cronulla-Sutherland Sharks	14–12	Newcastle Knights	Sunday 18 August; 1:45 PM	NRLW; NRL	PointsBet Stadium	Daniel Luttringer		
Wests Tigers	10–12	Parramatta Eels	Sunday 18 August; 6:10 PM	NRLW (Only)	Campbelltown Sports Ground	Damian Brady		

Notes:
- Attendance at Queensland Country Bank Stadium was NRLW 1,458 (versus Gold Coast Titans and NRL 17,920 (versus Canberra Raiders). During the three hour gap between the conclusion of the NRLW match at 2:20 PM and the NRL kick-off at 5:30 PM, an All Abilities game was played.
- Both matches at PointsBet Stadium were Cronulla Sharks versus Newcastle Knights.

=== Round 5 ===
Home	Score	Away	Match information					
Home	Score	Away	Date and time	Format	Venue	Referees	Attendance	Reports
Parramatta Eels	16–36	Newcastle Knights	Saturday 24 August; 11:38 AM	NRLW; HNWP	Eric Tweedale Stadium	Belinda Sharpe		
Canberra Raiders	18–28	North Queensland Cowboys	Saturday 24 August; 12:45 PM	NRLW; NRL	GIO Stadium	Luke Saldern	4,177	
Gold Coast Titans	26–6	Sydney Roosters	Sunday 25 August; 12:00 PM	NRLW; NRL	Cbus Super Stadium	Dan Schwass	7,503	
Wests Tigers	14–44	Brisbane Broncos	Sunday 25 August; 1:45 PM	HNWP; NRLW	Leichhardt Oval	Daniel Luttringer	1,022	
St. George Illawarra Dragons	4–28	Cronulla-Sutherland Sharks	Sunday 25 August; 6:10 PM	NRL; NRLW	WIN Stadium	Clayton Wills	3,741	

Notes:
- The kick-off at Eric Tweedale Stadium was delayed by over thirty minutes as a trauma paramedic was not present.
- Attendance at GIO Stadium was NRLW 4,177 (versus North Queensland) and NRL 17,523 (versus Penrith).
- Attendance at Cbus Super Stadium was NRLW 7,503 and NRL 19,286, with both matches against Sydney Roosters.
- Attendance at WIN Stadium was NRL 17,754 and, after a portion of the crowd had left the venue, an estimated NRLW 3,741. Both matches were against Cronulla.

=== Round 6 ===
Home	Score	Away	Match information					
Home	Score	Away	Date and time	Format	Venue	Referees	Attendance	Reports
Gold Coast Titans	6–22	Cronulla-Sutherland Sharks	Saturday 31 August; 11:05 AM	NRLW; Only	Cbus Super Stadium	Ziggy Przeklasa-Adamski		
Parramatta Eels	14–42	St. George Illawarra Dragons	Saturday 31 August; 12:45 PM	NRLW; NRL	CommBank Stadium	Daniel Luttringer		
Newcastle Knights	34–6	Wests Tigers	Sunday 1 September; 12:00 PM	NRLW; NRL	McDonald Jones Stadium	Luke Saldern		
Brisbane Broncos	38–12	North Queensland Cowboys	Sunday 1 September; 1:45 PM	NRLW; Only	Totally Workwear Stadium	Daniel Schwass		
Sydney Roosters	34–20	Canberra Raiders	Sunday 1 September; 6:10 PM	NRL; NRLW	Allianz Stadium	Belinda Sharpe		

Note: The matches at CommBank Stadium and Allianz Stadium feature the same opponents. At McDonald Jones Stadium Newcastle host Wests Tigers in NRLW and Gold Coast in NRL.

=== Round 7 ===
Home	Score	Away	Match information					
Home	Score	Away	Date and time	Format	Venue	Referees	Attendance	Reports
North Queensland Cowboys	24–22	Wests Tigers	Saturday 7 September; 11:05 AM	NRLW (Only)	Queensland Country Bank Stadium	Dan Schwass	1,314	
St. George Illawarra Dragons	34–38	Canberra Raiders	Saturday 7 September; 12:45 PM	NRLW; NRL	Netstrata Jubilee Stadium	Karra-Lee Nolan	5,570	
Cronulla-Sutherland Sharks	0–40	Sydney Roosters	Sunday 8 September; 12:00 PM	NRLW (Only)	PointsBet Stadium	Belinda Sharpe	1,901	
Parramatta Eels	24–14	Gold Coast Titans	Sunday 8 September; 1:45 PM	NRLW; HNWP	Eric Tweedale Stadium	Luke Saldern	734	
Newcastle Knights	24–32	Brisbane Broncos	Sunday 8 September; 6:10 PM	NRL; NRLW	McDonald Jones Stadium	Ziggy Przeklasa-Adamski		

Note: The matches at Netstrata Jubilee Stadium feature the same opponents. At McDonald Jones Stadium Newcastle host the Dolphins in NRL and Brisbane Broncos in NRLW.

=== Round 8 ===
Home	Score	Away	Match information					
Home	Score	Away	Date and time	Format	Venue	Referees	Attendance	Reports
Wests Tigers	16–14	St. George Illawarra Dragons	Thursday 12 September; 7:45 PM	NRLW (Only)	Leichhardt Oval	Luke Saldern	506	
Brisbane Broncos	20–16	Cronulla-Sutherland Sharks	Saturday 14 September; 12:00 PM	NRLW; NRLW	Cbus Super Stadium	Daniel Schwass		
Gold Coast Titans	10–46	Newcastle Knights	Saturday 14 September; 1:45 PM	NRLW; NRLW	Cbus Super Stadium	Belinda Sharpe	2,219	
Sydney Roosters	24–12	North Queensland Cowboys	Sunday 15 September; 12:00 PM	HNWP; NRLW	Industree Group Stadium	Ziggy Przeklasa-Adamski	2,927	
Canberra Raiders	16–18	Parramatta Eels	Sunday 15 September; 1:45 PM	NRLW (Only)	GIO Stadium	Karra-Lee Nolan	1,928	

=== Round 9 ===
Home	Score	Away	Match information					
Home	Score	Away	Date and time	Format	Venue	Referees	Attendance	Reports
Cronulla-Sutherland Sharks	10–12	Wests Tigers	Thursday 19 September; 7:45 PM	NRLW (Only)	PointsBet Stadium	Karra-Lee Nolan		
St. George Illawarra Dragons	14–44	Brisbane Broncos	Saturday 21 September; 1:30 PM	NRLW; NRLW	Queensland Country Bank Stadium	Dan Schwass	1,224	
North Queensland Cowboys	6–38	Newcastle Knights	Saturday 21 September; 3:15 PM	NRLW; NRLW	Queensland Country Bank Stadium	Belinda Sharpe		
Canberra Raiders	16–12	Gold Coast Titans	Sunday 22 September; 1:30 PM	NRLW; NRLW	CommBank Stadium	Luke Saldern		
Parramatta Eels	18–32	Sydney Roosters	Sunday 22 September; 3:15 PM	NRLW; NRLW	CommBank Stadium	Ziggy Przeklasa-Adamski	1,425	

== Finals series ==
Within two hours of full time in the last regular season match, the NRL announced the kick-off times of the semi-finals and confirmed the venues. The matches are 1st vs 4th and 2nd vs 3rd.

Home	Score	Away	Match information					
Home	Score	Away	Date and time	Format	Venue	Referees	Attendance	Reports
Brisbane Broncos	0–14	Cronulla-Sutherland Sharks	Sunday. 29 September; 2:05 PM	NRLW (Only)	Totally Workwear Stadium	Belinda Sharpe	2,327	
Sydney Roosters	25–16	Newcastle Knights	Sunday, 29 September; 4:15 PM	NRLW (Only)	Allianz Stadium	Ziggy Przeklasa-Adamski	2,271	

=== Grand Final ===
Home	Score	Away	Match information					
Home	Score	Away	Date and time	Format	Venue	Referee	Attendance	Reports
Sydney Roosters	32–28	Cronulla-Sutherland Sharks	Sunday, 6 October; 3:55 PM	NRLW; NRL	Accor Stadium	Ziggy Przeklasa-Adamski	40,623	

== Weekly awards ==
After each round, the NRL announces via social media four weekly awards.

Round	Player of the Round	Next Gen Player	Try of the Week		Tackle of the Week	Ref
Round	Player of the Round	Next Gen Player	Try-scorer	Assisting Players	Tackle of the Week	Ref
Sponsor	Bundy Mixer	Harvey Norman	Drinkwise		youi	
1	Evania Pelite	Rory Owen	Jocelyn Kelleher	Tarryn Aiken, Jessica Sergis	Jesse Southwell	
2	Kennedy Cherrington	Lilly-Ann White	Losana Lutu	Kezie Apps	Laishon Albert-Jones	
3	Mele Hufanga	Rosemarie Beckett	Mele Hufanga	Destiny Brill	Georgia Hale	
4	Isabelle Kelly	Chloe Jackson	Julia Robinson	Intercepted opponent's pass	Abbi Church	
5	Evania Pelite	Evie Jones	Krystal Blackwell	Ran from dummy-half	Abigail Roache	
6	Tarryn Aiken	Eliza Lopamaua	Jakiya Whitfeld	Kirra Dibb	Apii Nicholls	
7	Isabelle Kelly	Lillian Yarrow	Rory Owen	Collected loose pass and ran 60m	Maatuleio Fotu-Moala	
8	Sheridan Gallagher	Kasey Reh	Otesa Pule	Jocelyn Kelleher	Zahara Temara	
9	Julia Robinson	Tavarna Papalii	Zali Fay	Rachael Pearson	Zahara Temara	

== Team of the Year ==
=== Dally M Team of the Year ===
Announced on the evening of 2 October 2024.

Jersey	Position	Player
1	Fullback	Abbi Church
2	Wing	Julia Robinson
3	Centre	Isabelle Kelly
4	Centre	Tiana Penitani
5	Wing	Stacey Waaka
6	Five-eighth	Zahara Temara
7	Halfback	Lauren Brown
8	Prop	Millie Elliott
9	Hooker	Keeley Davis
10	Prop	Shannon Mato
11	Second-row	Olivia Kernick
12	Second-row	Yasmin Clydsdale
13	Lock	Simaima Taufa

=== Players' Dream Team ===
The Rugby League Players Association announced the 2024 Players' Dream team on 30 September 2024.

Jersey	Position	Player
1	Fullback	Tamika Upton
2	Wing	Julia Robinson
3	Centre	Isabelle Kelly
4	Centre	Annessa Biddle
5	Wing	Stacey Waaka
6	Five-eighth	Gayle Broughton
7	Halfback	Tarryn Aiken
8	Prop	Sarah Togatuki
9	Hooker	Quincy Dodd
10	Prop	Ellie Johnston
11	Second-row	Olivia Kernick
12	Second-row	Yasmin Clydsdale
13	Lock	Simaima Taufa
13	Impact	Grace Kemp

== Individual Awards ==
=== Dally M Medal Awards Night ===
Announced on the evening of 2 October 2024.

Dally M Medal Player of the Year:
Olivia Kernick ( Sydney Roosters)

Veronica White Medal:
Kimberley Hunt ( St George Illawarra Dragons).

Captain of the Year:
Tiana Penitani ( Cronulla-Sutherland Sharks).

Coach of the Year:
Scott Prince ( Brisbane Broncos).

Rookie of the Year:
Kasey Reh ( St George Illawarra Dragons).

Try of the Year:
Zali Fay ( Parramatta Eels)
vs Sydney Roosters in Round 9.

Tackle of the Year:
Abigail Roache ( Newcastle Knights)
vs Parramatta Eels in Round 5.

=== RLPA Players' Champion Awards ===
The following awards are voted for by NRLW players and announced at the end of the season.
The Players' Champion:
Isabelle Kelly ( Sydney Roosters)

Rookie of the Year:
Rory Owen ( Parramatta Eels)

The following award, selected from five nominees, was announced at the end of the season.
Dennis Tutty Award:
Kennedy Cherrington ( Parramatta Eels)

=== Statistical Awards ===
Highest Point Scorer in Regular-season: Romy Teitzel ( Brisbane Broncos) 64 (4t 24g)
Top Try Scorer in Regular-season:

- Sheridan Gallagher ( Newcastle Knights) 9
- Julia Robinson ( Brisbane Broncos) 9

=== Club Awards ===
Club	Player of the Year	Player's Player	Members' Award	Coach's Award	Rookie / Emerging Talent	Community	Ref
Brisbane	Julia Robinson	Julia Robinson	—	—	Stacey Waaka	—	
Canberra	Simaima Taufa	—	—	Chanté Temara	Relna Wuruki-Hosea	—	
Cronulla	Tiana Penitani	Quincy Dodd & Brooke Anderson	Tiana Penitani	—	Georgia Hannaway	Emma Tonegato	
Gold Coast	Evania Pelite	Evania Pelite	Evania Pelite	—	Georgia Grey	—	
Newcastle	Tamika Upton	Laishon Albert-Jones	—	—	Tenika Willison	Kayla Romaniuk	
North Queensland	Bree Chester	Jakiya Whitfeld	Jakiya Whitfeld	Alisha Foord	Lily Peacock	—	
Parramatta Eels	Elsie Albert	Abbi Church	Abbi Church	Rachael Pearson	Rory Owen	Mahalia Murphy	
St George Illawarra	Alexis Tauaneai & Angelina; Teakaraanga-Katoa	—	Teagan Berry	Jamilee Bright	Kasey Reh	—	
Sydney Roosters	Olivia Kernick	Isabelle Kelly	Isabelle Kelly	—	Eliza Lopomaua	—	
Wests Tigers	Sarah Togatuki	Brooke Talataina	—	—	Natasha Penitani	Botille Vette-Welsh	

As clubs each define their own award categories there are awards that do not fit into the above categories:

- Brisbane Broncos
  - Most Consistent: Julia Robinson
  - Best Back: Julia Robinson
  - Best Forward: Keilee Joseph
  - Play of the Year: Chelsea Lenarduzzi last minute try in Round 8 versus Cronulla Sharks
- Canberra Raiders
  - Junior Representative Player of the Year: Claudia Finau
- Cronulla Sharks
  - Education Excellence Award: Tiana Penitani
- Newcastle Knights
  - Gladiator of the Year: Olivia Higgins
  - Knight in Shining Armour: Yasmin Clydsdale
  - NSWRL Women's Premiership Player of the Year: Joeli Morris
  - NSWRL Women's Premiership Players' Player: Evah McEwen & Melanie Howard
- Parramatta Eels
  - NSWRL Women's Premiership Player of the Year: Losalio Sita Payne
  - NSWRL Women's Premiership Coaches Award: Ryshe Fa'amausili
- Sydney Roosters
  - Wellbeing & Education Award: Brydie Parker
  - Try of the Year: Tarryn Aiken in Round 6 versus Canberra Raiders
- Wests Tigers
  - NSWRL Women's Premiership Player of the Year: Claudia Brown
  - NSWRL Women's Premiership Players' Player: Darcy Eade

== Players and transfers ==
The 2024 season salary cap for clubs is $1,020,000 and the minimum wage for contracted players is $34,000. Squad size is 24 players plus 4 development players. The first transfer signing was announced on 20 October 2023. Clubs are required to fill their 24-player roster by late May 2024.

Tables last updated: 11 September 2024.

2024 NRLW Transfers
Player	2023 Club	2024 Club	Announcement Date	Reference
Jakiya Whitfeld	Wests Tigers	North Queensland Cowboys	20 Oct 2023	
Keilee Joseph	Sydney Roosters	Brisbane Broncos	1 Dec 2023	
Tiana Davison	Newcastle Knights	Sydney Roosters	15 Dec 2023	
Jasmin Strange	Newcastle Knights	Sydney Roosters	15 Dec 2023	
Claudia Nielsen	NSW Rugby Sevens	Wests Tigers	20 Dec 2023	
Natasha Penitani	Cronulla Sharks (HNWP)	Wests Tigers	20 Dec 2023	
Amelia Huakau	Parramatta Eels	Wests Tigers	16 Jan 2024	
Harata Butler	Cronulla-Sutherland Sharks	North Queensland Cowboys	18 Jan 2024	
Pia Tapsell	Western Force (Rugby Union)	Cronulla-Sutherland Sharks	6 Feb 2024	
Stacey Waaka	NZ Rugby Sevens	Brisbane Broncos	6 Mar 2024	
Liz Tafuna	USA Rugby Sevens	Sydney Roosters	3 Apr 2024	
Ivana Lolesio	Queensland Rugby Sevens	Gold Coast Titans	5 Apr 2024	
Filomina Hanisi	Brisbane Broncos	Cronulla-Sutherland Sharks	1 May 2024	
Sereana Naitokatoka	Cronulla-Sutherland Sharks	Canberra Raiders	14 May 2024	
Amelia Pasikala	Sydney Roosters	Canberra Raiders	14 May 2024	
Georgia Hannaway	North Devils (BMD 2024)	Cronulla-Sutherland Sharks	14 May 2024	
Ngatokotoru Arakua	Souths Logan Magpies (BMD 2024)	Gold Coast Titans	21 May 2024	
Georgia Sim	Queensland Rugby Sevens	Gold Coast Titans	21 May 2024	
Tatiana Finau	Canterbury Bulldogs (HNWP)	Canberra Raiders	22 May 2024	
Relna Wuruki-Hosea	Brisbane Tigers (Qld U19 2024)	Canberra Raiders	22 May 2024	
Grace Kukutai	Chiefs Manawa (Union 2024)	Newcastle Knights	24 May 2024	
Isabella Waterman	Hurricanes Poua (Union 2024)	Newcastle Knights	24 May 2024	
Kimberley Hunt	Parramatta Eels	St George Illawarra Dragons	29 May 2024	
Maatuleio Fotu-Moala	No Club	St George Illawarra Dragons	3 Jun 2024	
Alice Gregory	NSW Rugby Sevens	St George Illawarra Dragons	3 Jun 2024	
Shaianne McGlone	Burleigh Bears (BMD 2024)	Wests Tigers	4 Jun 2024	
Tara Reinke	Canberra Raiders	Wests Tigers	4 Jun 2024	
Nakia Davis-Welsh	Parramatta Eels	Cronulla-Sutherland Sharks	5 Jun 2024	
Bree Spreadborough	Central Qld Capras (BMD 2024)	Brisbane Broncos	7 Jun 2024	
Stephanie Hancock	Gold Coast Titans	St George Illawarra Dragons	11 Jun 2024	
Mia Middleton	North Queensland Cowboys	Parramatta Eels	11 Jun 2024	
Rory Owen	No Club	Parramatta Eels	11 Jun 2024	
Kate Fallon	South Sydney Rabbitohs (U19 2023)	Parramatta Eels	16 Jun 2024	
Rosie Kelly	Matatū (Union 2024)	Parramatta Eels	9 Jul 2024	
Taina Naividi	ACL injury	Sydney Roosters	17 Jul 2024	
Samantha Bremner	Retirement and pregnancy	Sydney Roosters	19 Jul 2024	
Tenika Willison	NZ Rugby Sevens	Newcastle Knights	26 Jul 2024	
Bridget Hoy	Tweed Seagulls (BMD 2024)	Brisbane Broncos	30 Jul 2024	
Sharni Smale	Australia Rugby Sevens	Cronulla-Sutherland Sharks	13 Aug 2024	
Breanna Eales	Brisbane Broncos	Parramatta Eels	18 Aug 2024	
Montana Clifford	Burleigh Bears (BMD 2024)	Wests Tigers	20 Aug 2024	
Dominique du Toit	Australia Rugby Sevens	Cronulla-Sutherland Sharks	20 Aug 2024	
Kayla Jackson	Toowoomba Clydesdales	Sydney Roosters	3 Sep 2024	
Jazmon Tupou-Witchman	Cronulla-Sutherland Sharks; South Sydney Rabbitohs (HNWP 2024)	North Queensland Cowboys	10 Sep 2024	

The following players have been promoted from a development contract or their NRLW club's pathway teams.

2024 NRLW Promoted Players
Player	Pathway Teams	2024 NRLW Club	Announcement Date	Reference
Imogen Hei	2023 Sydney Roosters (U19); 2024 Sydney Roosters (U19)	Sydney Roosters	13 Dec 2023	
Aliyah Nasio	2023 Central Coast Roosters (Open); 2024 Sydney Roosters (U19)	Sydney Roosters	13 Dec 2023	
Harmony Crichton	2023 Wests Tigers (U19 & Open)	Wests Tigers	20 Dec 2023	
Tiana Lee-Thorne	2023 Wests Tigers (U19 & Open); 2024 Wests Tigers (U19)	Wests Tigers	20 Dec 2023	
Matekino Gray	2023 Burleigh Bears (U19 & Open); 2024 Burleigh Bears (Open)	Gold Coast Titans	25 Jan 2024	
Lily Kolc	2023 Burleigh Bears (U19 & Open); 2024 Tweed Head Seagulls (Open)	Gold Coast Titans	25 Jan 2024	
Malaela Sua	2023 Brisbane Tigers (U19 & Open); 2024 Souths Logan Magpies (Open)	Gold Coast Titans	25 Jan 2024	
Manilita Takapautolo	2024 Cronulla-Sutherland Sharks (U19)	Cronulla-Sutherland Sharks	30 Jan 2024	
Skyla Adams	2023 Sydney Roosters (U19); 2024 Souths Logan Magpies (Open)	Brisbane Broncos	26 Mar 2024	
Kasey Reh	2024 Illawarra Steelers (U19)	St George Illawarra Dragons	1 May 2024	
Bronte Wilson	2024 Illawarra Steelers (U19)	St George Illawarra Dragons	1 May 2024	
Georgia Willey	2023 Canberra Raiders (U19)	Canberra Raiders	6 May 2024	
Jaida Faleono	2023 Tweed Seagulls (U19); 2024 Canberra Raiders (U19)	Canberra Raiders	22 May 2024	
Evie Jones	2023 Newcastle Knights (U19); 2024 Newcastle Knights (U19)	Newcastle Knights	24 May 2024	
Tafao Asaua	2023 Manly Sea Eagles (U19); 2023 Parramatta Eels (Development)	Parramatta Eels	1 Jun 2024	
Chloe Jackson	2023 North Sydney Bears (U19 & Open); 2023 Parramatta Eels (Development)	Parramatta Eels	1 Jun 2024	
Koreti Leilua	2024 Cronulla Sharks (U19)	Cronulla-Sutherland Sharks	8 Jul 2024	
Grace-Lee Weekes	2023 North Sydney Bears (U19 & Open); 2023 Cronulla Sharks (Development)	Cronulla-Sutherland Sharks	8 Jul 2024	
Eliza Lopamaua	2023 Sydney Roosters (U19); 2024 Sydney Roosters (U19)	Sydney Roosters	17 Jul 2024	
Lilly-Ann White	2023 Newcastle Knights (U19); 2024 Newcastle Knights (U19); 2024 Newcastle Knights (Development)	Newcastle Knights	30 Jul 2024	
Lailani Montgomery	2023 Sydney Roosters (U19); 2024 Sydney Roosters (U19); 2024 Gold Coast Titans (Development)	Gold Coast Titans	13 Aug 2024	
Maria Paseka	2023 Illawarra Steelers (U19); 2024 Illawarra Steelers (U19 & Open)	St George Illawarra Dragons	20 Aug 2024	
Jordyn Preston	2023 Illawarra Steelers (Open); 2024 Illawarra Steelers (Open)	St George Illawarra Dragons	23 Aug 2024	
Sarina Masaga	2024 Burleigh Bears (U19 & Open); 2024 Gold Coast Titans (Development)	Gold Coast Titans	8 Sep 2024	
