= Jazmon Tupou-Witchman =

Cook Islands international rugby league player (born 2003)

Personal information
- Full name: Jazmon Tupou-Witchman
- Born: 19 December 2003 (age 22)
- Height: 175 cm (5 ft 9 in)
- Weight: 71 kg (11 st 3 lb)

Playing information
- Position: Second-row, Centre
Club
Years	Team	Pld	T	G	FG	P
2023	Cronulla Sharks	2	0	0	0	0
2024	Nth Qld Cowboys	1	0	0	0	0
	Total	3	0	0	0	0
Representative
Years	Team	Pld	T	G	FG	P
2022–24	Cook Islands	5	1	0	0	4
- Source: As of 16 November 2026

Jazmon Tupou-Witchman (born 19 December 2003) is a Cook Islands professional rugby league footballer.

A second-row or centre, she is previously played for the Cronulla Sharks and North Queensland Cowboys.

== Background ==
Tupou-Witchman played her junior rugby league for the Ellerslie Eagles in Auckland before moving to Australia. In Australia, she attended Marsden State High School and played for the Redlands Parrots.

== Playing career ==
=== Early years ===
In 2019, Tupou-Witchman represented Queensland under-18s in their loss to New South Wales.

In 2020, she joined the Sydney Roosters, playing two seasons for their Tarsha Gale Cup side. In 2021, she represented Queensland under-19.

In 2022, she played for the Wynnum Manly Seagulls in the QRL Women's Premiership, being named their Player of the Year. In November 2022, she represented the Cook Islands at the Rugby League World Cup.

=== 2023 ===
On 24 May, Tupou-Witchman signed with the Cronulla Sharks.

In Round 1 of the 2023 NRL Women's season, she made her NRLW debut in the Sharks' 28–14 win over the Canberra Raiders. She left the club at the end of the season following the expiration of her contract.

In October, she represented the Cook Islands in their 28–20 loss to Papua New Guinea.

=== 2024 ===
Tupou-Witchman joined the South Sydney Rabbitohs for the NSWRL Women's Premiership season.

On 9 September, Tupou-Witchman joined the North Queensland Cowboys for the remainder of the 2024 NRL Women's season. In Round 8, she made her debut for the Cowboys, coming off the bench in a loss to the Sydney Roosters. She left the club at the end of the season, rejoining the Rabbitohs.
