= Brock Gray =

Australian rugby league player

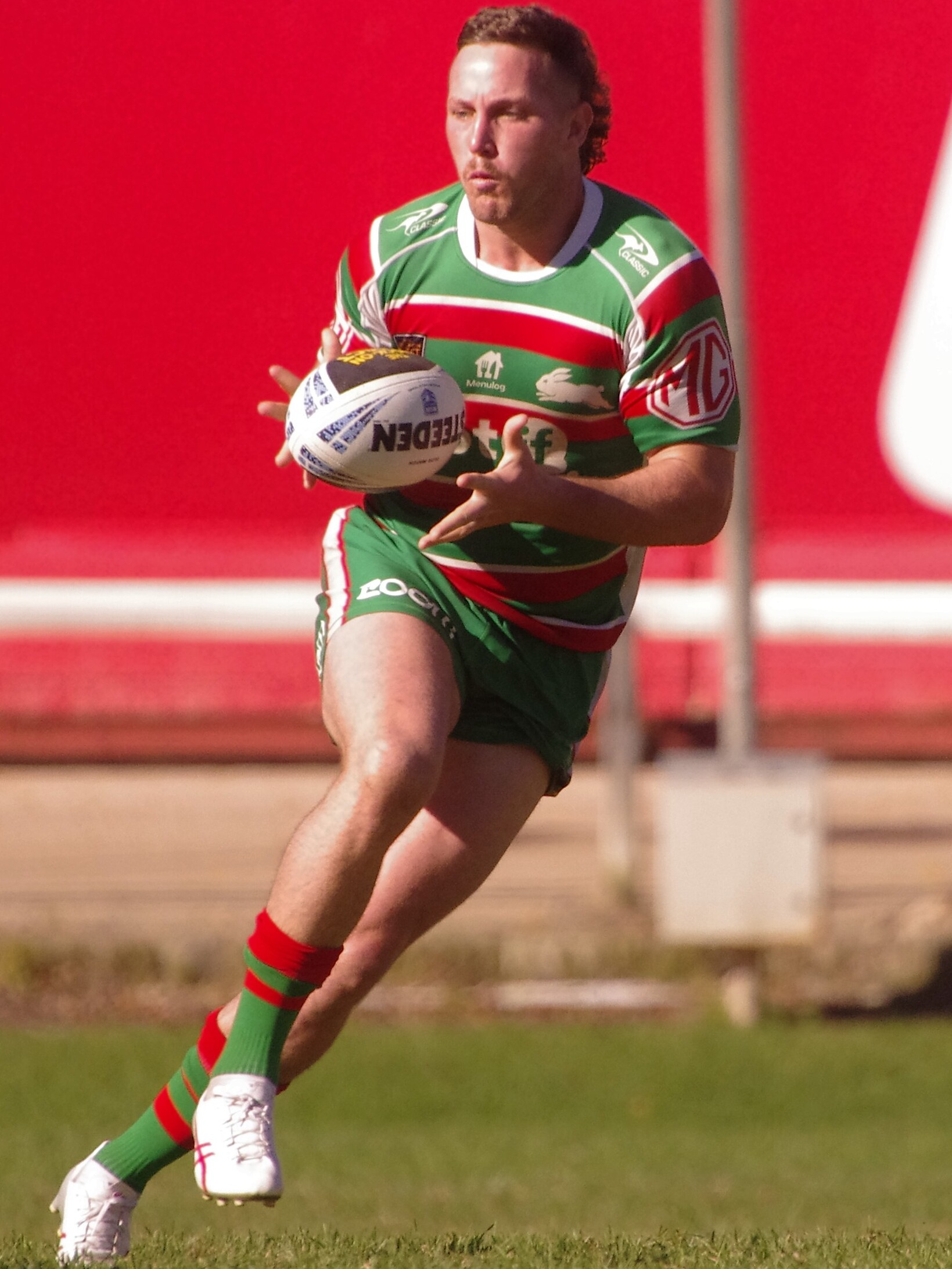

Personal information
- Full name: Brock Gray
- Born: 27 July 1996 (age 29) Sydney, New South Wales, Australia
- Height: 188 cm (6 ft 2 in)
- Weight: 102 kg (16 st 1 lb)

Playing information
- Position: Prop
Club
Years	Team	Pld	T	G	FG	P
2025–	Gold Coast Titans	6	0	0	0	0
- Source: As of 21 August 2025
- Relatives: Aaron Gray (brother); Tiana Penitani (sister-in-law)

Brock Gray (born 27 July 1996) is an Australian rugby league footballer who plays as a prop for the Gold Coast Titans in the National Rugby League.

== Background ==
Gray played his junior rugby league for the Mascot Jets and attended Marcellin College Randwick before being signed by the South Sydney Rabbitohs.

He is the younger brother of former NRL player Aaron Gray and the brother-in-law of NRLW player Tiana Penitani.

== Playing career ==
=== Early career ===
Gray spent his entire junior career with the Rabbitohs, playing for their Harold Matthews Cup side in 2012, their SG Ball Cup from 2013 to 2014, and their NYC side from 2014 to 2016.

From 2015 to 2024, Gray spent nine seasons in the New South Wales Cup, playing 129 games for the North Sydney Bears, Wyong Roos, South Sydney Rabbitohs and Newtown Jets.

On 24 September 2017, he started at second-row and scored a try in Wyong's Grand Final loss to the Penrith Panthers. In 2023, he played in South Sydney's NSW Cup Grand Final and NRL State Championship victories.

=== 2025 ===
Gray joined the Gold Coast Titans for the 2025 preseason on a train and trial contract, eventually earning a full-time development contract.

In Round 2 of the 2025 NRL season, Gray made his NRL debut for the Titans in 40–24 loss to the Canterbury Bulldogs. In Round 8, he tore his ACL, ruling him out for the rest of the 2025 season. On 27 November 2025, the Titans announced that Gray re-signed with the club for a further two years.
