= Jacinta Carter =

Australian rugby league player

Personal information
- Born: 21 January 2004 (age 22) Brisbane, Queensland, Australia
- Height: 172 cm (5 ft 8 in)
- Weight: 94 kg (14 st 11 lb)

Playing information
- Position: Prop
Club
Years	Team	Pld	T	G	FG	P
2023–24	Newcastle Knights	3	0	0	0	0
2025–	Cronulla Sharks	16	1	0	0	4
	Total	19	1	0	0	4
Representative
Years	Team	Pld	T	G	FG	P
2026	Prime Minister's XIII	1	0	0	0	0
- Source: As of 31 October 2026

Jacinta Carter (born 21 January 2004) is an Australian professional rugby league footballer. Her position is prop. She plays prop for Cronulla Sharks in the NRL Women's Premiership. Previously she played for the Newcastle Knights.

== Background ==
Born in Brisbane, Queensland, Carter played her junior rugby league for the Norths Devils.

== Playing career ==
=== Early years ===
Carter played for the Wynnum Manly Seagulls under-19s side from 2021 to 2022. She also gained selection in the women's Queensland under-19s State of Origin team in 2022 and 2023.

=== 2023 ===
In 2023, Carter joined the Newcastle Knights' NSWRL Women's Premiership team. In May, she signed a development contract with the Knights' NRLW team. She was later promoted to the NRLW top 24 squad. In round 8 of the 2023 NRLW season, she made her NRLW debut for the Knights against the Sydney Roosters.

=== 2024 ===
After 3 games with the Knights, Carter parted ways with the club at the end of the season.

=== 2026 ===
She made her Prime Minister's XIII début on 3 October 2026 in the 6-66 win over PNG Prime Minister's XIII in Port Moresby.
