= Talei Holmes =

Fiji international rugby league footballer (born 2000)

Personal information
- Born: 23 March 2000 (age 26) Sutherland, New South Wales, Australia
- Height: 170 cm (5 ft 7 in)
- Weight: 69 kg (10 st 12 lb)

Playing information
- Position: Second-row, Lock
Club
Years	Team	Pld	T	G	FG	P
2020–22	St George Illawarra	10	0	0	0	0
2023–	Cronulla Sharks	36	0	0	0	0
	Total	46	0	0	0	0
Representative
Years	Team	Pld	T	G	FG	P
2019–26	Fiji	8	1	0	0	4
- Source: As of 8 November 2026

Talei Holmes (born 23 March 2000) is an Australian rugby league footballer who plays for the Cronulla Sharks in the NRL Women's Premiership and the Cronulla-Sutherland Sharks in the NSWRL Women's Premiership.

Primarily a second-rower, she is captain of Fiji.

== Background ==
Holmes was born in Sutherland, New South Wales and played her junior rugby league for Cronulla-Caringbah. She is of Fijian descent.

== Playing career ==
In 2017 and 2018, Holmes played for the Cronulla-Sutherland Sharks in the Tarsha Gale Cup, winning a premiership with the team in 2018.

In 2019, Holmes moved up to the Sharks' NSWRL Women's Premiership team. On 22 June 2019, she started at second-row for Fiji in their 28–0 win over Papua New Guinea.

=== 2020 ===
On 24 September, Holmes joined the St George Illawarra Dragons NRL Women's Premiership team. In Round 1 of the 2020 NRL Women's season, she made her debut for the Dragons in a 4–18 loss to the Sydney Roosters.

=== 2022 ===
Talei Holmes was re-signed by the St George Illawarra Dragons for the delayed 2021 NRLW season, playing a role in their qualification for the Grand Final, eventually losing to the Sydney Roosters 4-16.

Holmes remained with the Dragons for the 2022 season.

=== 2023 ===
In 2023 Talei Holmes re-joined her junior club the Cronulla Sharks for their inaugural team in the NRLW, and signed a three year deal.

=== 2024 ===
Holmes was in the Sharks team that made it all the way to the Grand Final, finishing runners up, going down 28-32 to the Sydney Roosters.

Holmes represented Fiji in the Pacific Championships and was appointed captain by coach Joe Dakuitoga.

=== 2025 ===
Holmes was selected in the Fijian Bulikula side for the inaugual World Series in Ontario, Canada in October 2025, where Fiji will look to book their place in the 2026 Rugby League World Cup.
