= Cronulla-Sutherland Sharks Women =

Australian rugby league football club

Club information
- Full name: Cronulla Sutherland; District Rugby League; Football Club Ltd
- Nickname(s): Sharks, Sharkies
- Colours: Sky blue White; Black
- Founded: 1963 as Cronulla-Caringbah; 1967 in NSWRL Men’s; 2023 Women’s NRLW
- Website: sharks.com.au

Current details
- Ground: Endeavour Field (17,000)
- CEO: Dino Mezzatesta
- Coach: Tony Herman
- Captain: Tiana Penitani Gray
- Competition: National Rugby League
- Current season

Uniforms
Home colours	Away colours

Records
- Runners-up: 1 (2024)
- First game: Sharks 28 – 14 Raiders; PointsBet Stadium (23 July 2023)
- Biggest win: Sharks 56 – 6 Eels; GIO Stadium (17 Sep 2023); Sharks 56 – 6 Raiders; GIO Stadium (12 Jul 2025)
- Biggest loss: Sharks 0 – 40 Roosters; PointsBet Stadium (8 Sep 2024)
- Most recent game: Sharks 16 – 8 Dragons; Allianz Stadium (12 Sep 2026)
- Most capped: 43 – Ellie Johnston
- Highest try scorer: 25 – Georgia Ravics
- Highest points scorer: 100 – Georgia Ravics

The Cronulla-Sutherland Sharks Women are an Australian professional rugby league club based in Cronulla, in the Sutherland Shire of Southern Sydney, New South Wales. They compete in the National Rugby League Women's Premiership (NRLW), Australasia's premier rugby league competition for female players. The Sharks, as they are commonly known, were admitted to the NRLW in June 2022 to commence in the 2023 NRL Women's season.

== Seasons ==
Season	Regular Season								Finals		Ref
Season	P	W	D	L	F	A	Pts	Pos	Top	Placing	Ref
2023	9	4	0	5	202	150	8	6th	4	—	
2024	9	6	0	3	146	122	12	4th	4	Runners Up	
2025	11	6	0	5	217	194	12	5th	6	Preliminary Finalists	
2026	11	3	0	8	188	278	6	9th	6	—	

=== 2026 Draw ===
The draw for the 2026 season was announced on 14 November 2025.

Round	Opponent	Score	Date	Time	Venue	
1	Knights	4–18	Thu 2 Jul 2026	7:45 PM	Home	Sharks Stadium
2	Broncos	16–22	Thu 9 Jul 2026	7:45 PM	Home	Sharks Stadium
3	Bulldogs	18–24	Sat 18 Jul 2026	5:15 PM	Away	Accor Stadium
4	Raiders	22–10	Sat 25 Jul 2026	12:45 PM	Away	GIO Stadium
5	Tigers	20–32	Sat 1 Aug 2026	12:00 PM	Neutral	Geohex Stadium, Wagga Wagga
6	Titans	10–24	Sat 8 Aug 2026	3:15 PM	Home	Sharks Stadium
7	Cowboys	18–30	Sun 16 Aug 2026	6:15 PM	Away	Queensland Country Bank Stadium
8	Eels	16–42	Sun 23 Aug 2026	6:15 PM	Home	Sharks Stadium
9	Roosters	8–36	Sat 29 Aug 2026	3:15 PM	Away	Allianz Stadium
10	Warriors	40–32	Sat 5 Sep 2026	12:45 PM	Away	Go Media Stadium
11	Dragons	16–8	Sat 12 Sep 2026	5:10 PM	Home	Allianz Stadium

== Head-to-head records ==
Opponent	First Meeting	P	W	D	L	PF	PA	Win %	Share
Raiders	23 Jul 2023	4	4	0	0	130	42	100.00%	75.58%
Tigers	30 Jul 2023	4	1	0	3	50	70	25.00%	41.67%
Titans	5 Aug 2023	4	2	0	2	52	48	50.00%	52.00%
Roosters	13 Aug 2023	6	0	0	6	74	201	0.00%	26.91%
Cowboys	19 Aug 2023	5	3	0	2	110	76	60.00%	59.14%
Knights	27 Aug 2023	4	2	0	2	51	70	50.00%	42.15%
Broncos	2 Sep 2023	5	1	0	4	88	102	20.00%	46.32%
Dragons	7 Sep 2023	4	4	0	0	80	26	100.00%	75.47%
Eels	17 Sep 2023	4	2	0	2	106	82	50.00%	56.38%
Warriors	24 Aug 2025	2	2	0	0	62	46	100.00%	57.41%
Bulldogs	6 Sep 2025	2	0	0	2	32	48	0.00%	40.00%
Totals	23 Jul 2023	44	21	0	23	835	811	47.73%	50.73%

Notes

- Share % is the percentage of points For over the sum of points For and Against.
- Clubs listed in the order than the Sharks Women first played them.
- As of 15 September 2026

== Coaches ==
The inaugural coach of the Cronulla Sharks Women's team will coach a fourth successive season in 2026.
As of 15 September 2026

Coach	Season Span	M	W	D	L	For	Agst	Win %	Share %	Ref
Tony Herman	2023–present	44	21	0	23	835	811	47.73%	50.73%	

== Captains ==
All players that have captained the Cronulla-Sutherland Sharks Women's in NRLW matches.
As of 15 September 2026

C#	Name	Years as Captain	Debut		Games as Captain			Games for Club	Ref
C#	Name	Years as Captain	Date	Round	Solo	Joint	Total	Games for Club	Ref
1	Tiana Penitani Gray	2023–present	23 Jul 2023	1	40	0	40	40	
2	Quincy Dodd	2025–present	9 Aug 2025	6	4	0	4	37	

== Current squad ==
The team is coached by Tony Herman.
Jersey numbers in the table reflect the team list announced for Round 11.
Table last updated on 14 September 2026.

J#	Player	Age	Position(s)	NRLW seasons				NRLW stats					Origin	Tests	All Stars
J#	Player	Age	Position(s)	Debut	2018-24	2025	2026	M	T	G	Pts	Prems	Origin	Tests	All Stars
1	Jada Taylor	23	Fullback, Centre	2022	1 8	6	11	26	9	0	36	—	—	—	2
2	Cassie Staples	33	Wing, Centre	2022	1 16	13	10	40	17	0	68	—	—	5	—
3	Tiana Penitani Gray	30	Centre, Fullback	2019	6 10 20	12	8	56	20	0	80	—	12	3	—
4	Annessa Biddle	24	Centre, Second-row	2023	19	7	6	32	6	0	24	—	—	8	2
5	Georgia Ravics	32	Wing	2023	16	12	7	35	25	0	100	—	—	—	—
6	Madison Ashby	25	Five-eighth, Centre	2026	—	U7s	11	11	0	0	0	—	—	—	—
7	Chantay Kiria-Ratu	21	Halfback, Five-eighth	2023	11	13	9	33	5	31	83	—	3	4	—
8	Ellie Johnston	25	Prop	2020	3 12 20	13	10	58	16	0	64	—	6	3	—
9	Quincy Dodd	26	Hooker	2019	5 13 20	7	10	55	17	0	68	—	5	5	8
10	Manilita Takapautolo	20	Prop, Second-row	2024	7	13	11	31	1	0	4	—	—	1	—
11	Talei Holmes	26	Second-row, Lock	2020	10 19	13	4	46	0	0	0	—	—	4	—
12	China Polata	24	Second-row, Centre	2021	1 14	3	9	27	4	0	16	—	1	2	—
13	Anne-Marie Kiria-Ratu	20	Lock, Second-row	2025	—	9	10	19	1	0	4	—	—	2	—
14	Georgia Hannaway	25	Five-eighth, Hooker	2024	7	13	9	29	6	21	66	—	1	—	—
15	Stephanie Faulkner	21	Prop, Lock	2025	—	11	3	14	4	0	16	—	—	—	—
16	Caitlan Johnston-Green	25	Prop, Second-row	2019	3 20	3	11	37	5	0	20	2	4	4	5
17	Jacinta Carter	22	Prop	2023	3	8	8	19	1	0	4	1	—	—	—
18	Tegan Dymock	24	Lock, Prop	2021	6 19	5	9	39	2	0	8	—	—	3	—
19	Filomina Hanisi	25	Prop	2020	4 12 4 4	1	2	27	1	0	4	—	2	1	—
20	Olivia Herman	21	Halfback	2026	—	R	1	1	0	0	0	—	—	—	—
21	Milla Elaro	21	Wing, Centre	2026	—	U7s	4	4	4	0	16	—	—	—	—
22	Koffi Brookfield	19	Hooker	2026	—	R	4	4	0	0	0	—	—	—	—
–	Leilani Ahsam	20	Prop	—	—	R	—	0	0	0	0	—	—	2	—
–	Marewakiterangi Samson	21	Wing, Centre	2026	—	—	3	3	1	0	4	—	—	—	—
–	Nanise Vakacavu	21	Prop	—	—	R	—	0	0	0	0	—	—	2	—
IJ	Rhiannon Byers	27	Second-row, Centre	2023	11	7	5	23	5	0	20	—	—	—	1
IJ	Jaydika Tafua	20	Second-row	2025	—	9	7	16	2	0	8	—	—	1	—
IJ	Courtney Tyrell	19	Wing	—	—	R	—	0	0	0	0	—	—	—	—
IS	Najvada George	27	Lock, Second-row	2019	3 6 18	4	5	36	0	0	0	—	—	6	1
IS	Genevieve Mafi	19	Prop	—	—	R	—	0	0	0	0	—	—	—	—
IS	Grace-Lee Weekes	22	Centre, Wing	2025	—	8	H	8	1	0	4	—	—	—	—
P	Emma Verran	31	Five-eighth, Fullback	2021	13 18	12	P	43	17	0	68	—	11	9	1
P	Tyla King	32	Five-eighth, Fullback	2023	13	8	P	21	3	4	20	—	—	7	1

Notes:

- Chantay Kiria-Ratu kicked a field goal 46 seconds into golden point extra time to win the Sharks' Round 9 match against the Newcastle Knights on 31 August 2025.
- Koffi Brookfield and Leilani Ahsam were each signed on a supplementary contact for 2026.
- The following players were signed on a development contract for 2026:
  - Olivia Herman
  - Courtney Tyrell
  - Genevieve Mafi
  - Marewakiterangi Samson
- Emma Verran will miss the start of the 2026 season due to her pregnancy.
- The following players were signed on a development contract for 2025:
  - Stephanie Faulkner
  - Olivia Herman
  - Nanise Vacakavu
  - Tia-Jordyn Vasilovski
- Emma Verran played under her maiden name, Emma Tonegato up to the conclusion of the 2024 season.
- Filomina Hanisi sustained a ruptured ACL in Round 1, ruling her out for the remainder of the 2025 season.

The Cronulla Sutherland Sharks announced contract extensions in several instalments from November 2025. The Cronulla Sutherland Sharks announced player signings in several instalments from November 2025.

=== Players in ===
- Brooke Anderson from Dragons
- Teagan Berry from Dragons

=== Players extended ===
- Jaydika Tafua (2028)

=== Players out ===
- Emma Verran to Dragons

Released

- Caitlan Johnston-Green

Off contract

- Jacinta Carter
- Najvada George
- Talei Holmes
- Tyla King (Pregnancy)
- Georgia Ravics
- Cassie Staples
- Manilita Takapautolo
- Koffi Brookfield (Sup)
- Milla Elaro (Rpl)
- Olivia Herman (Dev)
- Madison Higgins-Ashby (Rpl)
- Marewakiterangi Samson (Dev)

==== Off contract after 2027 ====
- Annessa Biddle
- Rhiannon Byers
- Quincy Dodd
- Tegan Dymock
- Stephanie Faulkner
- Filomina Hanisi
- Georgia Hannaway
- Ellie Johnston
- Caitlan Johnston-Green
- Anne-Marie Kiria-Ratu
- Chantay Kiria-Ratu
- Tiana Penitani Gray
- China Polata
- Jada Taylor
- Grace-Lee Weekes

== Individual awards ==
=== Club awards ===
The Cronulla Sharks NRLW club award winners since 2023.

Year	Player of the Year	Player's Player	NRLW Members' Player of the Year	Rookie of the Year	Sharks Have Heart Community Award	Wellbeing & Education Excellence Award	Ref
2023	Tiana Penitani	Annessa Biddle	—	Annessa Biddle	Jada Taylor	Andie Robinson	
2024	Tiana Penitani	Quincy Dodd & Brooke Anderson	Tiana Penitani	Georgia Hannaway	Emma Tonegato	Tiana Penitani	
2025	Emma Verran	Manilita Takapautolo	Emma Verran	Stephanie Faulkner	Rhiannon Byers	Quincy Dodd	
2026	Quincy Dodd	Jacinta Carter	Ellie Johnston	Madison Ashby	Jada Taylor	Grace-Lee Weekes	

== Club records ==
Win Loss Record since entering the NRLW in 2023

Games	Wins	Drawn	Loss	Points For	Points Against	+/-	Win %
44	21	0	23	835	811	+24	47.73%

=== Player records ===
Lists and tables last updated: 15 September 2026.

==== Career records (at the Sharks) ====
===== Most Games for the Sharks =====
Qualification: 20 games

Rank	Player	Span	Games
1	Ellie Johnston	2023–present	43
2	Tiana Penitani Gray	2023–present	40
3	Cassie Staples	2023–present	39
4	Quincy Dodd	2023–present	37
5	Talei Holmes	2023–present	36
6	Georgia Ravics	2023–present	35
7	Brooke Anderson	2023–2025	32
7	Annessa Biddle	2023–present	32
9	Manilita Takapautolo	2024–present	31
10	Emma Verran	2023–present	30
11	Georgia Hannaway	2024–present	29
12	Tegan Dymock	2023–2024, 2026	28
13	Jada Taylor	2023–present	25
14	Rhiannon Byers	2023–present	23
15	Chantay Kiria-Ratu	2025–present	22
16	Vanessa Foliaki	2023–2024	20
16	Tayla Preston	2023–2024	20

===== Most Points for the Sharks =====
Qualification: 20 points

Rank	Player	2026 Club	M	T	G	FG	Points
1	Georgia Ravics		35	25	0	0	100
2	Tayla Preston		20	1	47	0	98
3	Chantay Kiria-Ratu		22	3	29	1	71
4	Cassie Staples		39	17	0	0	68
5	Georgia Hannaway		29	6	21	0	66
6	Ellie Johnston		43	14	0	0	56
7	Tiana Penitani Gray		40	13	0	0	52
8	Quincy Dodd		37	12	0	0	48
8	Emma Verran		30	12	0	0	48
10	Jada Taylor		25	8	0	0	32
11	Annessa Biddle		32	6	0	0	24
12	Rhiannon Byers		23	5	0	0	20

===== Most tries for the Sharks =====
Qualification: 5 tries

Rank	Player	Tries
1	Georgia Ravics	25
2	Cassie Staples	17
3	Ellie Johnston	14
4	Tiana Penitani Gray	13
5	Quincy Dodd	12
5	Emma Verran	12
7	Jada Taylor	8
8	Annessa Biddle	6
8	Georgia Hannaway	6
10	Rhiannon Byers	5

===== Most goals for the Sharks =====
All goal kickers

Rank	Player	Goals
1	Tayla Preston	47
2	Chantay Kiria-Ratu	29
3	Georgia Hannaway	21

===== Most field goals for the Sharks =====
One instance to date

Rank	Player	Field goals
1	Chantay Kiria-Ratu	1

==== Season records ====
Season length has increased over time as the competition has expanded.

===== Most points in a season =====
Qualification: 20 points

Rank	Player	Season	M	T	G	FG	Points
1	Tayla Preston	2023	9	1	25	0	54
2	Tayla Preston	2024	11	0	22	0	44
2	Chantay Kiria-Ratu	2026	9	2	18	0	44
4	Georgia Hannaway	2025	13	2	17	0	42
5	Georgia Ravics	2025	12	10	0	0	40
6	Tiana Penitani Gray	2024	11	9	0	0	36
6	Emma Verran	2025	12	9	0	0	36
8	Cassie Staples	2025	13	8	0	0	32
9	Chantay Kiria-Ratu	2025	13	1	11	1	27
10	Ellie Johnston	2023	9	6	0	0	24
11	Georgia Ravics	2023	5	5	0	0	20
11	Georgia Ravics	2024	11	5	0	0	20
11	Georgia Hannaway	2026	9	3	4	0	20
11	Georgia Ravics	2026	7	5	0	0	20

===== Most tries in a season for the Sharks =====
Qualification: 4 tries

Rank	Player	Season	M	Tries
1	Georgia Ravics	2025	12	10
2	Tiana Penitani Gray	2024	11	9
2	Emma Verran	2025	12	9
4	Cassie Staples	2025	13	8
5	Ellie Johnston	2023	9	6
6	Georgia Ravics	2023	5	5
6	Georgia Ravics	2024	11	5
6	Georgia Ravics	2026	7	5
9	Annessa Biddle	2024	11	4
9	Ellie Johnston	2024	11	4
9	Cassie Staples	2024	11	4
9	Quincy Dodd	2026	10	4
9	Milla Elaro	2026	4	4

==== Match records ====
===== Most points in a game =====
Qualification: 10 points

Rank	Player	Date	Opponent	Venue	T	G	FG	Points
1	Tayla Preston	17 Sep 2023	Eels	GIO Stadium	1	8	0	20
2	Emma Verran	12 Jul 2025	Raiders	GIO Stadium	4	0	0	16
2	Georgia Hannaway	12 Jul 2025	Raiders	GIO Stadium	0	8	0	16
4	Chantay Kiria-Ratu	5 Sep 2026	Warriors	Go Media Stadium	1	5	0	14
5	Georgia Hannaway	20 Sep 2025	Cowboys	Queensland Country Bank Stadium	1	4	0	12
5	Tayla Preston	19 Aug 2023	Cowboys	Queensland Country Bank Stadium	0	6	0	12
5	Georgia Ravics	31 Aug 2025	Knights	Sharks Stadium	3	0	0	12

===== Most tries in a game =====
Qualification: 2 tries

Rank	Player	Date	Opponent	Venue	Tries
1	Emma Verran	12 Jul 2025	Raiders	GIO Stadium	4
2	Georgia Ravics	31 Aug 2025	Knights	Sharks Stadium	3
3	Annessa Biddle	17 Sep 2023	Eels	GIO Stadium	2
3	Quincy Dodd	23 Jul 2023	Raiders	PointsBet Stadium	2
3	Ellie Johnston	17 Sep 2023	Eels	GIO Stadium	2
3	Georgia Ravics	17 Sep 2023	Eels	GIO Stadium	2
3	Cassie Staples	27 Jul 2024	Cowboys	PointsBet Stadium	2
3	Georgia Ravics	25 Aug 2024	Dragons	WIN Stadium	2
3	Tiana Penitani-Gray	25 Aug 2024	Dragons	WIN Stadium	2
3	Georgia Ravics	31 Aug 2024	Titans	Cbus Super Stadium	2
3	Tiana Penitani-Gray	6 Oct 2024	Roosters	Accor Stadium	2
3	Rhiannon Byers	12 Jul 2025	Raiders	GIO Stadium	2
3	Stephanie Faulkner	12 Jul 2025	Raiders	GIO Stadium	2
3	Georgia Ravics	19 Jul 2025	Cowboys	Sharks Stadium	2
3	Cassie Staples	27 Jul 2025	Tigers	Sharks Stadium	2
3	Georgia Ravics	9 Aug 2025	Dragons	Jubilee Stadium	2
3	Cassie Staples	9 Aug 2025	Dragons	Jubilee Stadium	2
3	Emma Verran	24 Aug 2025	Warriors	FMG Stadium Waikato	2
3	Georgia Ravics	1 Aug 2026	Tigers	Geohex Park, Wagga Wagga	2
3	Milla Elaro	16 Aug 2026	Cowboys	Queensland Country Bank Stadium	2
3	Quincy Dodd	5 Sep 2026	Warriors	Go Media Stadium	2

===== Most Goals in a game =====
Qualification: 4 goals

Rank	Player	Date	Opponent	Venue	Tries
1	Tayla Preston	17 Sep 2023	Eels	GIO Stadium	8
1	Georgia Hannway	12 Jul 2025	Raiders	GIO Stadium	8
3	Tayla Preston	19 Aug 2023	Cowboys	GIO Stadium	6
4	Chantay Kiria-Ratu	5 Sep 2026	Warriors	Go Media Stadium	5
5	Tayla Preston	2 Sep 2023	Broncos	Queensland Country Bank Stadium	4
5	Georgia Hannaway	20 Sep 2025	Cowboys	Queensland Country Bank Stadium	4

==== Oldest and youngest players ====
The oldest and youngest players to represent the Cronulla Sharks women in the NRLW.

Name	Age	Year
Sharni Smale	36 and 190 days	2024
Manilita Takapautolo	18 and 50 days	2024

==== First try and last try ====
Who scored the first try and most recent try for the Sharks.

Name	Year	Round	Minute	Opponent
Emma Verran	2023	1	7'	Raiders
Ellie Johnston	2026	11	47'	Warriors

=== Margins and streaks ===
Biggest winning margins
Qualification: 14 point margin

Margin	Score	Opponent	Venue	Date	Round
50	56—6	Eels	GIO Stadium	17 Sep 2023	9
50	56–6	Raiders	GIO Stadium	12 Jul 2025	2
28	40–12	Cowboys	Queensland Country Bank Stadium	19 Aug 2023	5
24	28– 4	Dragons	WIN Stadium	25 Aug 2024	5
16	22– 6	Titans	Cbus Super Stadium	31 Aug 2024	6
14	14– 0	Broncos	Totally Workwear Stadium	29 Sep 2024	Semi Final
14	14– 0	Cowboys	Sharks Stadium	27 July 2024	1
14	28– 14	Raiders	Sharks Stadium	23 July 2023	1
14	20– 6	Dragons	Jubilee Stadium	9 Aug 2025	6

Biggest losing margins
Qualification: 14 point margin

Margin	Score	Opponent	Venue	Date	Round
40	0–40	Roosters	PointsBet Stadium	8 Sep 2024	7
30	10–40	Roosters	Polytec Stadium	11 Sep 2025	11
28	8–36	Roosters	Allianz Stadium	29 Aug 2026	9
26	16–42	Eels	Ocean Protect Stadium	23 Aug 2026	8
24	12–36	Roosters	PointsBet Stadium	13 Aug 2023	4
14	14–28	Broncos	McDonald Jones Stadium	2 Aug 2025	5
14	4–18	Knights	Ocean Protect Stadium	2 Jul 2026	1
14	10–24	Titans	Ocean Protect Stadium	8 Aug 2026	6

Most consecutive wins

- 8 — (7 September 2023 — 31 August 2024)
- 4 — (9 August 2025 — 31 August 2025)

Most consecutive losses

- 5 — (1 August 2026 — 29 August 2026)
- 4 — (27 September 2025, and 2 July 2026 — 18 July 2026)

Biggest Comeback

- Recovered from 14 point deficit to win. Trailed Newcastle Knights 4-18 after 61 minutes at Sharks Stadium on August 31, 2025 and won 19-18.

Worst Collapse

- Surrendered 12 point lead. Led Sydney Roosters 12-0 after 24 minutes at PointsBet Stadium on August 13, 2023 and lost 12-36.

== History ==
In 2016, the Cronulla-Sutherland Sharks and St. George Illawarra Dragons Women contested a Women's Nine's match, which served as a curtain-raiser to the NRL match between the Sharks and Sydney Roosters, at Southern Cross Group Stadium. The Sharks won the match 16–12. Also in 2016, the feeder club Cronulla-Caringbah Sharks won the NSWRL Women’s Premiership.

In March 2017, the Cronulla-Sutherland Sharks played another Women's Nine's match, this time defeating the Canberra Raiders by 28–10.

In 2018 the club entered teams as Cronulla-Sutherland in the NSWRL Women’s Premiership and the inaugural Tarsha Gale Cup for Under 18 players. The Sharks’ Under 18 team were undefeated premiers.

In April 2022 the club submitted their application to enter the 2023 NRL Women’s Premiership. In June 2022 the NRL announced that the Sharks were one of four clubs accepted into the NRLW for the 2023 season.

The club announced their NRLW coaching staff for the 2023 season in late November 2022, with Tony Herman appointed head coach. In April 2023 the first four Sharks signings were announced, in order: Quincy Dodd (Jillaroos, Dragons), Emma Tonegato (Jillaroos, Dragons), Holli Wheeler (Jillaroos, Dragons) and Jada Taylor (Roosters). A further five players were announced as having signed with the Sharks at the end of that same month.

First match and first win

Result	Score	Opponent	Venue	Date	Ref
Won	28–32	Canberra Raiders	PointsBet Stadium	6 October 2024	

=== First Team ===
The first ever Cronulla Sharks team who played the Canberra Raiders on the 23rd July 2023 at PointsBet Stadium. The Cronulla Sharks won the match 28-14.

Jersey	Position	Player
1	Fullback	Jada Taylor
2	Wing	Annessa Biddle
3	Centre	Tiana Penitani-Gray (c)
4	Centre	Kiana Takairangi
5	Wing	Andie Robinson
6	Five-eighth	Emma Verran
7	Halfback	Tayla Preston
8	Prop	Ellie Johnston
9	Hooker	Quincy Dodd
15	Prop	Harata Butler
11	Second-row	Talei Holmes
12	Second-row	Vanessa Foliaki
13	Lock	Brooke Anderson
14	Five-eighth	Sereana Naitoktoka
15	Second-row	Rhiannon Byers
16	Second-row	Jazmon Tupou-Witchman
17	Prop	Chloe Saunders
	Coach	Tony Herman

=== Grand Final appearances ===
Result	Score	Opponent	Venue	Date	Ref
Lost	28–32	Sydney Roosters	Accor Stadium	6 Oct 2024	

== Players ==
The following players have appeared in NRL Women's Premiership matches for the Sharks.
Table last updated: 15 September 2026.

Order	Player	Sharks					First Appearance
Order	Player	M	T	G	FG	Pts	Game	Date	Opponent
1	Tiana Penitani Gray	40	13	0	0	52	1	23 Jul 2023	Raiders
2	Brooke Anderson	32	4	0	0	16	1	23 Jul 2023	Raiders
3	Annessa Biddle	32	6	0	0	24	1	23 Jul 2023	Raiders
4	Harata Butler	8	0	0	0	0	1	23 Jul 2023	Raiders
5	Quincy Dodd	37	12	0	0	48	1	23 Jul 2023	Raiders
6	Vanessa Foliaki	20	1	0	0	4	1	23 Jul 2023	Raiders
7	Talei Holmes	36	0	0	0	0	1	23 Jul 2023	Raiders
8	Ellie Johnston	43	14	0	0	56	1	23 Jul 2023	Raiders
9	Tayla Preston	20	1	47	0	98	1	23 Jul 2023	Raiders
10	Andie Robinson	6	1	0	0	4	1	23 Jul 2023	Raiders
11	Kiana Takairangi	5	2	0	0	8	1	23 Jul 2023	Raiders
12	Jada Taylor	25	8	0	0	32	1	23 Jul 2023	Raiders
13	Emma Verran	30	12	0	0	48	1	23 Jul 2023	Raiders
14	Sereana Naitokatoka	9	2	0	0	8	1	23 Jul 2023	Raiders
15	Chloe Saunders	18	2	0	0	8	1	23 Jul 2023	Raiders
16	Rhiannon Byers	23	5	0	0	20	1	23 Jul 2023	Raiders
17	Jazmon Tupou-Witchman	2	0	0	0	0	1	23 Jul 2023	Raiders
18	Tegan Dymock	28	2	0	0	8	2	30 Jul 2023	Wests Tigers
19	Cassie Staples	39	17	0	0	68	2	30 Jul 2023	Wests Tigers
20	Fiona Jahnke	1	0	0	0	0	3	5 Aug 2023	Titans
21	Holli Wheeler	17	2	0	0	8	3	5 Aug 2023	Titans
22	Maddie Studdon	1	0	0	0	0	4	13 Aug 2023	Roosters
23	Georgia Ravics	35	25	0	0	100	5	19 Aug 2023	Cowboys
24	Georgia Hannaway	29	6	21	0	66	10	27 Jul 2024	Cowboys
25	Manilita Takapautolo	31	1	0	0	4	11	4 Aug 2024	Eels
26	Nakia Davis-Welsh	12	3	0	0	12	12	10 Aug 2024	Raiders
27	Sharni Smale	4	0	0	0	0	13	18 Aug 2024	Knights
28	Dominique du Toit	3	1	0	0	4	16	8 Sep 2024	Roosters
29	Filomina Hanisi	7	1	0	0	4	17	14 Sep 2024	Broncos
30	Jacinta Carter	16	1	0	0	4	21	3 Jul 2025	Eels
31	Chantay Kiria-Ratu	22	3	29	1	71	21	3 Jul 2025	Eels
32	Jaydika Tafua	16	2	0	0	8	21	3 Jul 2025	Eels
33	Stephanie Faulkner	14	4	0	0	16	22	12 Jul 2025	Raiders
34	Grace-Lee Weekes	8	1	0	0	4	23	19 Jul 2025	Cowboys
35	Tyla King	8	0	0	0	0	24	26 Jul 2025	Wests Tigers
36	Anne-Marie Kiria-Ratu	19	1	0	0	4	24	26 Jul 2025	Wests Tigers
37	Leki Leilua	1	0	0	0	0	25	2 Aug 2025	Broncos
38	Caitlan Johnston-Green	14	1	0	0	4	27	16 Aug 2025	Titans
39	China Polata	9	1	0	0	4	34	2 Jul 2026	Knights
40	Madison Ashby	11	0	0	0	0	34	2 Jul 2026	Knights
41	Najvada George	5	0	0	0	0	34	2 Jul 2026	Knights
42	Milla Elaro	4	4	0	0	16	39	8 Aug 2026	Titans
43	Koffi Brookfield	4	0	0	0	0	39	8 Aug 2026	Titans
44	Marewakiterangi Samson	3	1	0	0	4	40	16 Aug 2026	Cowboys
45	Olivia Herman	1	0	0	0	0	42	29 Aug 2026	Roosters

== Representative honours ==
=== National team representatives ===
Player	Club Debut	Country	International Debut	Years	Ref
Brooke Anderson	23 Jul 2023	New Zealand	14 Oct 2023	2023–2025	
Annessa Biddle	23 Jul 2023	New Zealand	14 Oct 2023	2023–2025	
Quincy Dodd	23 Jul 2023	Australia	18 Oct 2024	2024–2025	
Tegan Dymock	30 Jul 2023	Tonga	**25 Jun 2022**	2023–2024	
Vanessa Foliaki	23 Jul 2023	Tonga	21 Oct 2023	2023–2024	
Filomina Hanisi	14 Sep 2024	Tonga	19 Oct 2024	2024	
Talei Holmes	23 Jul 2023	Fiji	**22 Jun 2019**	2023–2024	
Fiona Jahnke	5 Aug 2023	Samoa	15 Oct 2023	2023	
Ellie Johnston	23 Jul 2023	Australia	26 Oct 2025	2025	
Tyla King	26 Jul 2025	New Zealand	**14 Oct 2023**	2025	
Anne-Marie Kiria-Ratu	26 Jul 2025	Cook Islands	18 Oct 2025	2025	
Chantay Kiria-Ratu	3 Jul 2025	Cook Islands	**2 Nov 2022**	2025	
Sereana Naitokatoka	23 Jul 2023	Fiji	**22 Jun 2019**	2023	
Tiana Penitani Gray	23 Jul 2023	Australia	**25 Oct 2019**	2024–2025	
Tiana Penitani Gray	23 Jul 2023	Tonga	21 Oct 2023	2023	
Cassie Staples	30 Jul 2023	Fiji	15 Oct 2023	2023–2025	
Jaydika Tafua	3 Jul 2025	Samoa	26 Oct 2025	2025	
Kiana Takairangi	23 Jul 2023	Cook Islands	**16 Nov 2017**	2023	
Manilita Takapautolo	4 Aug 2024	Tonga	18 Oct 2024	2024	
Jazmon Tupou-Witchman	23 Jul 2023	Cook Islands	**2 Nov 2022**	2023	
Emma Verran	23 Jul 2023	Australia	**8 Jul 2013**	2023	

Notes:

- International Debut dates in **bold** indicate that the player made her first international appearance prior to playing for the Cronulla Sharks NRLW team.

=== Women's State of Origin representatives ===
Past and current players that have played for Queensland and New South Wales in the State of Origin.

Player	State	Year(s)
Brooke Anderson	New South Wales	2023
Quincy Dodd	New South Wales	2023
Tiana Penitani-Gray	New South Wales	2023–2025
Ellie Johnston	New South Wales	2025
Emma Verran	New South Wales	2023–2025
Georgia Hannaway	Queensland	2025

=== Prime Minister's XIII representatives ===
Past and current players that have been selected to play in the Prime Minister's XIII.

Player	Year(s)
Quincy Dodd	2025
Georgia Hannaway	2025

=== All-Stars Representatives ===
Past and current players that have played for the Indigenous All-Stars or for the Māori All-Stars.

==== Indigenous All Stars ====
Player	Year(s)
Quincy Dodd	2024–2026
Tommaya Kelly-Sines	2025
Rhiannon Byers	2026
Caitlan Johnston-Green	2026
Jada Taylor	2026

==== Māori All Stars (Māori people) ====
Player	Year(s)
Brooke Anderson	2024
Annessa Biddle	2024–2025
Tyla King	2025

== Feeder team seasons ==
The Cronulla-Sutherland Sharks run women's pathways teams in the NSWRL Women's Premiership, the Tarsha Gale Cup, and the Lisa Fiaola Cup.

=== NSWRL Women's Premiership ===
Season	Regular Season									Finals		Ref
Season	P	W	D	L	B	F	A	Pts	Pos	Top	Placing	Ref
2018	9	4	0	5	2	208	162	12	5th	5	Semi-Finalist	
2019	7	5	1	1	4	156	76	19	3rd	8	Semi-Finalist	
2020	6	5	0	1	1	98	58	12	2nd	6	Preliminary Finalist	
2021	11	9	0	2	2	420	84	22	3rd	6	Abandoned	
2022	8	5	0	3	1	123	68	12	3rd	4	Grand-Finalist	
2023	10	4	0	6	1	207	194	10	7th	4	—	
2024	11	4	0	7	0	178	262	8	7th	4	—	
2025	11	8	0	3	0	282	190	16	3rd	4	Premiers	
2026	11	4	1	6	0	162	234	9	9th	5	—	

=== Tarsha Gale Cup ===
For Under 18 players from 2018 to 2020. Since 2021, the Cup is for Under 19 players.

Season	Regular Season									Finals		Ref
Season	P	W	D	L	B	F	A	Pts	Pos	Top	Placing	Ref
2017	8	6	0	0	2	276	128	12	2nd	8	Preliminary Finalist	
2018	8	8	0	0	1	520	126	18	1st	8	Premiers	
2019	9	3	0	6	0	148	262	6	7th	8	Elimination Finalist	
2020	5	4	0	1	0	106	96	8	2nd	8	—	
2021	8	3	0	5	1	88	172	8	6th	6	Elimination Finalist	
2022	8	2	1	5	1	68	126	7	9th	6	—	
2023	8	3	1	4	1	84	172	9	8th	6	—	
2024	8	4	1	3	1	174	148	11	6th	6	Semi-Finalist	
2025	8	4	0	4	1	188	108	10	8th	8	Qualifying Finalist	
2026	8	6	0	2	1	192	88	14	4th	8	Grand Finalist	

=== Lisa Fiaola Cup ===
For Under 17 players.

Season	Regular Season									Finals		Ref
Season	P	W	D	L	B	F	A	Pts	Pos	Top	Placing	Ref
2024	8	2	0	6	1	104	170	6	8th	6	—	
2025	8	6	0	2	1	142	94	14	4th	8	Semi-Finalist	
2026	8	4	0	4	1	222	160	10	7th	8	Elimination Finalist	
