= Stephanie Ball =

Australian rugby league footballer

Personal information
- Born: 16 November 2000 (age 25) Wollongong, New South Wales, Australia
- Height: 167 cm (5 ft 6 in)
- Weight: 77 kg (12 st 2 lb)

Playing information
- Position: Prop
Club
Years	Team	Pld	T	G	FG	P
2020–	New Zealand Warriors	1	0	0	0	0
- As of 30 November 2020

Stephanie Ball (born 16 November 2000) is an Australian rugby league footballer who plays as a prop for the New Zealand Warriors in the NRL Women's Premiership and Mounties RLFC in the NSWRL Women's Premiership.

== Background ==
Born in Wollongong, Ball played junior rugby league for the Berkeley Eagles before joining the Canterbury-Bankstown Bulldogs.

== Playing career ==
In 2018, Ball played for the Bulldogs' Tarsha Gale Cup team. In 2019, she moved up to the club's NSWRL Women's Premiership team.

=== 2020 ===
On 18 September, Ball was announced as a member of the New Zealand Warriors NRL Women's Premiership squad. In Round 2 of the 2020 NRL Women's season, she made her NRLW debut, coming off the bench in the Warriors' 12–22 loss to the Sydney Roosters.

On 18 October, she won the club's Rookie of the Year award.

== Achievements and accolades ==
=== Individual ===
- New Zealand Warriors Rookie of the Year: 2020
