= Madison Ashby =

Australia international rugby union & league player

Madison Higgins-Ashby
- Born: Madison Ashby; 22 January 2001 (age 25)
- Height: 1.65 m (5 ft 5 in)
- Weight: 65 kg (10 st 3 lb)

Rugby union career
- Position: Centre
National sevens team
Years	Team	Comps
2019–25	Australia	
- Rugby league career

Playing information
- Position: Five-eighth, Halfback, Centre
Club
Years	Team	Pld	T	G	FG	P
2026–	Cronulla-Sutherland Sharks	11	0	0	0	0
Medal record
Women's rugby sevens
Representing Australia
Commonwealth Games
Gold medal – first place	2022 Birmingham	Team competition
Rugby Sevens World Cup
Gold medal – first place	2022 Cape Town	Team competition
Pacific Games
Silver medal – second place	2019 Pacific Games	Team competition

Madison Ashby (born 22 January 2001) is an Australian rugby union and rugby league player. She has represented Australia at sevens rugby at the Olympic and Commonwealth Games and was named co-captain in 2025.

She joined Cronulla-Sutherland Sharks who play in the NRLW for 2026.

== Early career ==
Ashby grew up playing league with boys before switching to rugby union when she was about 12. A year later she was competing in an open women’s competition.

== Career ==
=== Rugby union ===
Ashby debuted for Australia at the USA Women's Sevens in Glendale, Colorado in 2019.

She was named in the Australia squad for the 2020 Summer Olympics in Tokyo. The team came second in the pool round but then lost to Fiji 14–12 in the quarterfinals.

Ashby won a gold medal with the Australian sevens team at the 2022 Commonwealth Games in Birmingham. She was also a member of the Australian side that won the Sevens Rugby World Cup held in Cape Town, South Africa in September 2022.

At the beginning of 2024, she re-signed with the Australian sevens program until the end of 2026. In May that year, she sustained a knee injury at the Singapore Sevens which hampered her chances of going to the Paris Olympics. She ended her 484-day absence when she returned to the pitch for the ACT Brumbies at the Next Gen Sevens.

Ashby was named as co-captain of the sevens side, together with Isabella Nasser for the 2025–26 SVNS season. She left the Australia Sevens program after they won the 2025-26 World Championship.

=== Rugby league ===
Ashby joined Cronulla-Sutherland Sharks who play in the NRLW for 2026.
