= Filomina Hanisi =

Australian rugby league footballer (born 2001)

Personal information
- Born: 9 March 2001 (age 25) Sydney, New South Wales, Australia
- Height: 164 cm (5 ft 5 in)
- Weight: 77 kg (12 st 2 lb)

Playing information
- Position: Prop
Club
Years	Team	Pld	T	G	FG	P
2020	Sydney Roosters	4	0	0	0	0
2021–22	Parramatta Eels	12	0	0	0	0
2023	Brisbane Broncos	4	0	0	0	0
2024–	Cronulla Sharks	7	1	0	0	4
	Total	27	1	0	0	4
Representative
Years	Team	Pld	T	G	FG	P
2020–21	New South Wales	2	1	0	0	4
- Source: RLP As of 31 October 2026

Filomina Hanisi (born 9 March 2001) is an Australian rugby league footballer who plays as a prop for the Cronulla Sharks in the NRL Women's Premiership and Mounties RLFC in the NSWRL Women's Premiership.

== Background ==
Hanisi was born in Sydney and played her junior rugby league for the Concord Burwood Wolves. She is of Tongan descent.

== Playing career ==
In 2018, Hanisi played for the Parramatta Eels in the Tarsha Gale Cup. In 2019, she joined the St George Dragons Tarsha Gale Cup side.

On 21 June 2019, she started at prop for New South Wales under-18 in their 24–4 win over Queensland under-18. On 20 September 2019, she was announced as a development player for the St George Illawarra Dragons NRL Women's Premiership team.

=== 2020 ===
In 2020, Hanisi joined the Wests Tigers NSWRL Women's Premiership team. On 23 September, she was announced as a member of the Sydney Roosters NRL Women's Premiership squad.

In Round 1 of the 2020 NRL Women's season, she mader her debut for the Roosters in their 18–4 win over the St George Illawarra Dragons. On 25 October, Hanisi started at prop in the Roosters' 10–20 Grand Final loss to the Brisbane Broncos. At the end of the season, she won the Roosters' Rising Star award.

On 13 November, Hanisi made her State of Origin debut for New South Wales, coming off the bench and scoring a try in their 18–24 loss to Queensland.

== Achievements and accolades ==
=== Individual ===
- Sydney Roosters Rising Star: 2020
