= Tony Herman =

Australian rugby league footballer & coach

Personal information
- Full name: Tony Herman
- Born: 31 March 1966 (age 60)

Playing information
- Position: Wing
Club
Years	Team	Pld	T	G	FG	P
1989–95	Newcastle Knights	48	7	0	0	28

Coaching information
Club
Years	Team	Gms	W	D	L	W%
2023–	Cronulla Sharks Women	33	18	0	15	55

Tony Herman (born 31 March 1965) is a former professional rugby league footballer who played in the 1980s and 1990s. He played for the Newcastle Knights from 1989 to 1995. He currently coaches the Cronulla-Sutherland Sharks NRLW team since 2023 in their maiden year.

== Playing career ==
Herman made his debut for Newcastle against North Sydney at North Sydney Oval in Round 21 1989 which ended in a 14–1 victory.

In 1992, Herman played in the club's first ever finals campaign playing both games against Western Suburbs and St George.

In 1995, Herman played a career best 23 games for Newcastle as the club made it all the way to the preliminary final before being defeated by Manly 12–4. This in turn would prove to be Herman's final game in first grade.
