= Tiana Penitani =

Australia and Tonga international rugby league footballer (born 1996)

Tiana Penitani-Gray
Personal information
- Full name: Tiana Penitani-Gray
- Born: Tiana Penitani; 12 January 1996 (age 30) Canberra, Australian Capital Territory, Australia
- Height: 169 cm (5 ft 7 in)
- Weight: 73 kg (11 st 7 lb)

Playing information
- Position: Centre, Wing, Five-eighth
Club
Years	Team	Pld	T	G	FG	P
2019–20	St George Illawarra	6	3	0	0	12
2021–22	Parramatta Eels	10	4	0	0	16
2023–	Cronulla-Sutherland Sharks	40	13	0	0	52
	Total	56	20	0	0	80
Representative
Years	Team	Pld	T	G	FG	P
2019–26	New South Wales	12	4	0	0	16
2019	Australia 9s	5	5	0	0	20
2019–26	Australia	12	5	0	0	20
2023	Tonga	1	2	0	0	8
- Source: As of 16 November 2026
- Spouse: Aaron Gray
- Relatives: Brock Gray (brother-in-law)
Medals
Women's rugby sevens
Representing Australia
Youth Olympic Games
Gold medal – first place	2014 Nanjing	Team competition

Tiana Penitani-Gray (born 12 January 1996) is an Australian rugby league footballer who plays for the Cronulla-Sutherland Sharks in the NRL Women's Premiership and the Cronulla-Sutherland Sharks in the NSWRL Women's Premiership.

Primarily a centre, she is an Australia and New South Wales representative. She previously represented Australia in rugby sevens.

== Background ==
Born in Canberra, Penitani played junior rugby league for La Perouse United before switching to rugby union and Oztag. She is of Tongan descent.

== Playing career ==
=== Rugby union ===
In 2014, Penitani, along with Brooke Anderson, captained Australia to the Gold medal at the 2014 Summer Youth Olympics, held in China. This was the first time Rugby Sevens had been part of the Olympic programme since 1924. The tournament was Penitani's first in 14 months, following a serious knee injury sustained at the 2013 Rugby World Cup Sevens. At 17 years and 163 days old, she became Australia's youngest ever representative in either 15s or 7s at a World Cup, when she represented Australia in Russia.

In 2019, Penitani was on the award voting panels for both the World Rugby Men's Sevens Player of the Year and the World Rugby Women's Sevens Player of the Year.

=== Rugby league ===
In 2019, Penitani returned to rugby league, joining the Cronulla-Sutherland Sharks NSWRL Women's Premiership team. In May 2019, she represented NSW City at the Women's National Championships.

On 14 June 2019, she signed with the St. George Illawarra Dragons NRL Women's Premiership team.

On 21 June 2019, she made her debut for New South Wales, starting at centre in a 14–4 win over Queensland.

In Round 1 of the 2019 NRL Women's season, Penitani made her debut for the Dragons in a 4–14 loss to the Brisbane Broncos. On 6 October 2019, she started at centre in the Dragons' 6–30 Grand Final loss to the Broncos.

In October 2019, she represented Australia at the 2019 Rugby League World Cup 9s, scoring five tries and finishing as the tournament's top try scorer. On 25 October 2019, she made her Test debut for Australia in a 28–8 win over New Zealand.

Tiana was signed with the NRLW Cronulla Sharks inaugural team for 2023 and is the captain of the side.

== Achievements and accolades ==
=== Representative ===
- Rugby League World Cup Champion: 2026
