= Ellie Johnston (rugby league) =

Australia international rugby league footballer, born 2000

Personal information
- Born: 24 October 2000 (age 26) Taree, New South Wales, Australia
- Height: 178 cm (5 ft 10 in)
- Weight: 109 kg (17 st 2 lb)

Playing information
- Position: Prop
Club
Years	Team	Pld	T	G	FG	P
2020	St. George Illawarra	3	0	0	0	0
2021–22	Parramatta Eels	12	2	0	0	8
2023–	Cronulla Sharks	43	14	0	0	56
	Total	58	16	0	0	64
Representative
Years	Team	Pld	T	G	FG	P
2025–	New South Wales	6	2	0	0	8
2025–	Australia	5	1	0	0	4
- Source: As of 16 November 2026

Ellie Johnston (born 24 October 2000) is an Australian rugby league footballer who plays as a prop for the Cronulla Sharks in the NRL Women's Premiership and the South Sydney Rabbitohs in the NSWRL Women's Premiership.

== Background ==
Born in Taree, New South Wales, Johnston began playing rugby league for the Kendall Blues then the Long Flat Dragons, and rugby union for the Wauchope Thunder. She had previously represented Australia under-17 at indoor netball.

== Playing career ==
In May 2019, after playing for the North Coast Bulldogs at the Women's Country Championships, Johnston was selected to represent NSW Country at the Women's National Championships.

In September 2020, she joined the St. George Illawarra Dragons NRL Women's Premiership team. In Round 1 of the 2020 NRLW season, she made her debut for the Dragons in a 18–4 loss to the Sydney Roosters.

In the 2021 and 2022 NRL Women's Premiership seasons Johnston played as a prop for the Parramatta Eels.

== Achievements and accolades ==
=== Representative ===
- Rugby League World Cup Champion: 2026
