= Quincy Dodd =

Australia international rugby league player (born 2000)

Personal information
- Born: 13 April 2000 (age 26) Kogarah, New South Wales, Australia
- Height: 168 cm (5 ft 6 in)
- Weight: 63 kg (9 st 13 lb)

Playing information
- Position: Hooker, Halfback, Five-eighth
Club
| Years | Team | Pld | T | G | FG | P |
|---|---|---|---|---|---|---|
| 2019–20 | Sydney Roosters | 5 | 3 | 0 | 0 | 12 |
| 2021–22 | St. George Illawarra | 13 | 2 | 0 | 0 | 8 |
| 2023– | Cronulla Sharks | 37 | 12 | 0 | 0 | 48 |
| | Total | 55 | 17 | 0 | 0 | 68 |
Representative
| Years | Team | Pld | T | G | FG | P |
| 2018–25 | Prime Minister's XIII | 3 | 0 | 1 | 0 | 2 |
| 2019–25 | Indigenous All Stars | 4 | 0 | 0 | 0 | 0 |
| 2020–23 | New South Wales | 5 | 0 | 0 | 0 | 0 |
| 2024–26 | Australia | 7 | 3 | 0 | 0 | 12 |
- Source: RLP As of 16 November 2026

Quincy Dodd (born 13 April 2000) is an Australian rugby league footballer who plays for the Cronulla-Sutherland Sharks in the NRL Women's Premiership.

A hooker or halfback, she is a New South Wales and Australia representative.

== Background ==
Dodd was born in Kogarah, New South Wales and is a Cronulla-Caringbah junior.

== Playing career ==
In 2017 and 2018, Dodd played for the Cronulla-Sutherland Sharks Tarsha Gale Cup side, who were coached by her father, Colin.

In May 2018, Dodd represented NSW City at the Women's National Championships. In June 2018, she was 18th player for New South Wales.

In September 2018, she joined the Sydney Roosters NRL Women's Premiership squad but did not play a game. On 6 October 2018, she represented the Prime Minister's XIII in their win over Papua New Guinea.

=== 2019 ===
On 15 February, Dodd started at five-eighth for the Indigenous All Stars in their 4–8 loss to the Maori All Stars. In June, she represented NSW City at the Women's National Championships.

In Round 3 of the 2019 NRL Women's season, Dodd made her NRLW debut for the Roosters in their 16–24 loss to the St. George Illawarra Dragons. On 11 October, Dodd started at halfback for the Prime Minister's XIII in their 22–14 win over the Fiji Prime Minister's XIII.

=== 2020 ===
On 22 February, Dodd came off the bench in the Indigenous All Stars 10–4 win over the Maori All Stars. In March, Dodd joined the Canterbury-Bankstown Bulldogs NSWRL Women's Premiership team.

On 25 October, Dodd came off the bench and scored a try in the Roosters' 10–20 NRLW Grand Final loss to the Brisbane Broncos. On 13 November, Dodd made her State of Origin debut for New South Wales in their 18–24 loss to Queensland.

=== 2021 ===
On 20 February, Dodd represented the Indigenous All Stars for the third time, in their 24–0 loss to the Māori All Stars. In March, she rejoined the Sharks for the 2021 NSWRL Women's Premiership season.

=== 2022 ===
Played for the St George Illawarra Dragons in the delayed 2021 season and helped guide the Dragons to the Grand Final, which they lost 4-16 to the Sydney Roosters.

Dodd represented NSW in the Blues 20-14 win over Queensland in Canberra.

Dodd remained with the Dragons for the 2022 season.

=== 2023 ===
Quincy signs on as NRLW Shark #1.

=== 2024 ===
Dodd was an integral part in guiding the Sharks to their maiden NRLW Grand Final, eventually losing 28-32 to the Sydney Roosters.

Dodd was selected in the Australian Jillaroos squad for the 2024 Pacific Championships, and made her Test Debut against Papua New Guinea at Suncorp Stadium on Friday 18 October.

=== 2025 ===
On 6 October 2025, despite only playing seven NRLW games this season, Dodd was selected in the Australian Jillaroos squad for the upcoming Pacific Championships. On 12 October 2025 she played for the Prime Minister's XIII in the 50-0 win over the PNG Orchids in Port Moresby

== Achievements and accolades ==
=== Representative ===
- Rugby League World Cup Champion: 2026
