= Tarsha Gale Cup =

Gale Cup is an elite under-18s women's rugby league competition

Harvey Norman Tarsha Gale Cup
- Current season or competition: 2026 New South Wales Rugby League
- Sport: Rugby league
- Instituted: 2017
- Inaugural season: 2017
- Number of teams: 13
- Country: Australia
- Premiers: Parramatta Eels (2026)
- Most titles: Sydney Roosters Indigenous Academy; Illawarra Steelers; Parramatta Eels (2 titles)
- Website: Tarsha Gale Cup
- Related competition: NRL Women's Premiership; NSWRL Women's Premiership

The Tarsha Gale Cup is an elite under-19s women's rugby league competition in New South Wales and the Australian Capital Territory, Australia. The competition was named after former captain of Australia and current NRLW commentator, Tarsha Gale, in honour of her impact on Women's rugby league as a pioneer of the sport.

In 2017, the New South Wales Rugby League announced the creation of a nine-a-side under-18s women's league, named the Tarsha Gale Nines after the former Australian Jillaroos and New South Wales captain of the 1990s.

The tournament changed to eleven-a-side in the 2019.

Since 2020, the tournament has been played as a full 13-a-side game.

In the 2021 season, the age group changed from under-18s to under-19s. The equivalent competition for males, the S.G. Ball Cup, was also changed from under-18s to under-19s at this time.

The Tarsha Gale Cup is the main bridge between juniors and the NSWRL Women's Premiership in the state of New South Wales.

== Clubs ==
The Tarsha Gale Cup operates on a single table system, with no divisions, conferences nor promotion and relegation from other leagues. In 2018, the St. George Dragons and the Newcastle Knights entered teams into the competition for the first time.

=== Current clubs ===
Club	Established	City	Stadium
Canberra Raiders	1981	Canberra, ACT	Raiders Club, Belconnen
Canterbury-Bankstown Bulldogs	1934	Belmore, NSW	Belmore Sports Ground
Cronulla-Sutherland Sharks	1967	Woolooware, NSW	PointsBet Stadium
Manly Warringah Sea Eagles	1946	Brookvale, NSW	4 Pines Park
Illawarra Steelers	1981	Wollongong, NSW	Collegians Sporting Complex, Figtree; Sid Parrish Park, Figtree
Newcastle Knights	1987	Newcastle, NSW	Maitland Sports Ground; Cessnock Sports Ground; Kurri Kurri Sports Ground
North Sydney Bears	1908	North Sydney, NSW	North Sydney Oval
Parramatta Eels	1947	Cabramatta, NSW	New Era Stadium
Penrith Panthers	1967	Penrith, NSW	BlueBet Stadium, Windsor Sporting Complex
South Sydney Rabbitohs	1908	Redfern, NSW	Ironmark High Performance Centre
St George Dragons	1921	Kogarah, NSW	Netstrata Jubilee Stadium; Mascot Oval
Sydney Roosters Indigenous Academy	1908	Marrickville	Henson Park; Mascot Oval; Morry Breen Oval, Kanwal
Wests Tigers	1999*	Concord, NSW	Leichhardt Oval; Kirkham Oval, Camden; Wests Tigers Centre of Excellence

== Season structure ==
=== Pre-season ===
Prior to the commencement of the home-and-away season teams are paired off to play an exhibition trial match. In 2017 these matches took place during varying weeks of January.

=== Grand final ===
The two highest-place teams at the conclusion of the home-and-away season will qualify for the grand final. The winner of this match is determined the competition's premier.

== Results by year ==
Year	Age	Premiers	Score	Runners-up	Minor Premiers	Wooden Spoon	Notes
2017	U18s	Penrith Panthers	26 – 18	Canterbury-Bankstown Bulldogs	Canterbury-Bankstown Bulldogs	Wests Tigers	
2018	U18s	Cronulla-Sutherland Sharks	36 – 22	Newcastle Knights	Cronulla-Sutherland Sharks	Canterbury-Bankstown Bulldogs	
2019	U18s	Illawarra Steelers	24 – 12	Newcastle Knights	Illawarra Steelers	Canterbury-Bankstown Bulldogs	
2020	U18s	Season began in February but was cancelled in March due to the COVID-19 pandemic. No premiership was awarded.					
2021	U19s	St George Dragons	30 – 4	Sydney Roosters Indigenous Academy	Newcastle Knights	Canterbury-Bankstown Bulldogs	
2022	U19s	Sydney Roosters Indigenous Academy	12 – 10	Newcastle Knights	Sydney Roosters Indigenous Academy	South Sydney Rabbitohs	
2023	U19s	Sydney Roosters Indigenous Academy	26 - 24	Canterbury-Bankstown Bulldogs	Canterbury-Bankstown Bulldogs	Wests Tigers	
2024	U19s	Illawarra Steelers	24 – 12	Newcastle Knights	Illawarra Steelers	St George Dragons	
2025	U19s	Parramatta Eels	28 – 12	Sydney Roosters Indigenous Academy	Illawarra Steelers	Manly Sea Eagles	
2026	U19s	Parramatta Eels	20 – 6	Cronulla-Sutherland Sharks	Sydney Roosters Indigenous Academy	Manly Sea Eagles	

== Premiership tally ==
No.	Club	Seasons
1	Indigenous Academy	**2** (2022, 2023)
1	Illawarra Steelers	**2** (2019, 2024)
1	Parramatta Eels	**2** (2025, 2026)
4	St George Dragons	**1** (2021)
4	Cronulla-Sutherland Sharks	**1** (2018)
4	Penrith Panthers	**1** (2017)

Bold means the team still currently plays in the competition.

== Awards ==
The following major individual awards and accolades are presented each season

=== Player of the Series ===
Year	Player	Club	Ref
2018	Madison Higgins-Ashby	Cronulla-Sutherland Sharks	
2019	Maddison Weatherall	Illawarra Steelers	
2020	Not Awarded		
2021	Fatafehi Hanisi	St George Dragons	
2022	Otesa Pule	Indigenous Academy Sydney Roosters	
2023	Alexis Tauaneai	Canterbury Bulldogs	
2024	Kasey Reh	Illawarra Steelers	
2025	Ryvrr-Lee Alo	Parramatta Eels	
2026	Khyliah Gray	Parramatta Eels	

=== Grand Final Player of the Match ===
Year	Player	Club	Ref
2017	Ashlee Harrison	Penrith Panthers	
2018	Madison Higgins-Ashby	Cronulla-Sutherland Sharks	
2019	Teagan Berry	Illawarra Steelers	
2020	Not Awarded		
2021	Rayven-Jodeci Boyce	St George Dragons	
2022	Otesa Pule	Indigenous Academy Sydney Roosters	
2023	Tavarna Papalii	Canterbury Bulldogs	
2024	Indie Bostock	Illawarra Steelers	
2025	Tess McWilliams	Parramatta Eels	
2026	Freedom Crichton Ropati	Parramatta Eels	

== Top scorers ==
=== Tries ===
Year	Excluding Finals				Including Finals			
Year	Player	Club	Matches	Tries	Player	Club	Matches	Tries
2017	Tayla Preston	Sharks	8	12	Tayla Preston	Sharks	11	16
2017	Page McGregor	Bulldogs	4	12	Lilly-Rose Bennett	Steelers	7	16
2018	Maddison Weatherall	Steelers	9	19	Faith Nathan	Sharks	7	26
2019	Maddison Weatherall	Steelers	8	13	Maddison Weatherall	Steelers	12	17
2019	Mareva Swann	Dragons	9	13	Maddison Weatherall	Steelers	12	17
2020	Teagan Berry	Steelers	4	11	No Finals Series			
2020	Bienne Terita	Dragons	5	11	No Finals Series			
2021	Teagan Berry	Steelers	8	11	Teagan Berry	Steelers	9	11
2022	Otesa Pule	Roosters	7	12	Otesa Pule	Roosters	9	13
2023	Mia-Rose Walsh	Steelers	8	9	Mia-Rose Walsh	Steelers	10	10
2023	Litia Fusi	Bulldogs	8	9	Mia-Rose Walsh	Steelers	10	10
2024	Indie Bostock	Steelers	7	13	Indie Bostock	Steelers	9	15
2025	Manisha Seebeck	Roosters	7	10	Manisha Seebeck	Roosters	11	13
2026	Samantha Hanrahan	Panthers	7	10	Samantha Hanrahan	Panthers	9	12

Notes:

- Players' tries and matches were tallied offline from match statistics for seasons 2018 to 2026 available on the NSWRL website and sorted to determine the top try scorers.
- For the 2017 season, tries were collated from scores published on the NSWRL and League Unlimited websites. For example: Round 2 on League Unlimited and Round 3 on NSWRL.

=== Points ===
Year	Excluding Finals							Including Finals						
Year	Player	Club	M	T	G	FG	Points	Player	Club	M	T	G	FG	Points
2017	Page McGregor	Bulldogs	4	12	16	0	80	Page McGregor	Bulldogs	5	14	16	0	88
2018	Quincy Dodd	Sharks	8	12	55	0	158	Quincy Dodd	Sharks	10	13	63	0	178
2019	Sereana Naitokatoka	Dragons	8	5	29	0	78	Sereana Naitokatoka	Dragons	10	6	37	0	98
2020	Bienne Terita	Dragons	5	11	3	0	50	No Finals Series						
2021	Ruby Smith	Roosters	8	3	16	0	44	Ruby Smith	Roosters	11	3	19	0	50
2021	Teagan Berry	Steelers	8	11	0	0	44	Ruby Smith	Roosters	11	3	19	0	50
2022	Alysha Bell	Eels	6	2	24	0	56	Alysha Bell	Eels	7	2	25	0	58
2023	Ally Bullman	Roosters	8	7	18	0	64	Ally Bullman	Roosters	10	7	18	0	64
2024	Lara Cosgrove	Raiders	7	6	20	0	64	Chelsea Savill	Steelers	10	3	31	0	74
2025	Alleya Scrivens	Eels	4	2	21	0	50	Alleya Scrivens	Eels	7	2	30	0	68
2025	Elise Simpson	Raiders	6	3	19	0	50	Alleya Scrivens	Eels	7	2	30	0	68
2026	Ella Ropata	Sharks	8	4	28	0	72	Meg McPhail	Roosters	11	2	37	0	82

== Media coverage ==
=== Online ===
Selected games each week via NSWRL TV.

== Corporate relations ==
=== Sponsorship ===
Westpac is the league's current naming rights partner.

=== Merchandising ===
Official match day attire together with other club merchandise is sold through the NRL's stores and website as well through the clubs and through some retailers.

== See also ==
- Women's rugby league in Australia
