= 2026 NRL Women's Grand Final =

NRLW Grand Final

2026 NRL Women's Premiership Grand Final
- The match was played at Accor Stadium

Sydney Roosters	Brisbane Broncos
30	6
	1	2	Total
SYD	26	4	30
BRI	0	6	6
- Date: 4 October 2026
- Stadium: Accor Stadium
- Location: Sydney, New South Wales, Australia
- Karyn Murphy Medal: Tarryn Aiken
- Pre-Match Entertainment: Bachelor Girl
- Referee: Belinda Sharpe
- Attendance: 47,451

Broadcast partners
- Broadcasters: Nine Network

The 2026 NRL Women's Premiership Grand Final was the conclusive and premiership-deciding game of the 2026 National Rugby League Women's season in Australia. For the second consecutive year, it was contested between the Sydney Roosters and the Brisbane Broncos. The game kicked-off at 4:00 PM (AEDT) on Sunday, 4 October at Accor Stadium in Sydney.

The match will was preceded by the 2026 NRL State Championship and was by the National Rugby League grand final. The match was broadcast live throughout Australia by the Nine Network.

== Background ==
The 2026 NRL Women's season is the 9th season of semi-professional women's rugby league in Australia. The season consisted of 11 competition rounds, followed by a finals series contested by the top six teams on the competition ladder.

The Sydney Roosters finished first on the 2026 ladder with an undefeated record. In 2025, the National Rugby League had introduced a new award, the Nellie Doherty Shield, for the NRLW minor premiership. As in 2025, the Roosters won this Shield. The Roosters improved their regular season record, increasing their points scored from 366 in 2025 to 434 in 2026. Their defensive record also improved by a small margin, having conceded 126 points in 2025 they conceded 116 in 2026.

Receiving a bye in the first week of the finals series, the Roosters hosted the fifth-placed Canberra Raiders in a preliminary final at Allianz Stadium. A third minute try by left winger Jayme Fressard established a lead which was extended in the twentieth minute when interchange prop Rima Butler crashed over. Shortly before half-time the Raiders responded. Krystal Blackwell, who had recently swapped jerseys due to her bloodied nose, made an evasive twenty-two metre run to score an unconverted try. The Roosters led 10 to 4 at the break.

Ten minutes into the second stanza, Canberra’s Lily Boyle crossed the tryline but the ball was held up by the Roosters defenders. The bunker supported the on-field call of no try. A high kick from near the halfway line by Roosters five-eighth Jocelyn Kelleher was allowed to bounce by the Raiders’ left wing and fullback. A first bounce eluded their grasp. Running through at a fast pace, Roosters’ right centre Jessica Sergis collected the ball after a second bounce just ten metres out and crossed the tryline. With eleven minutes to go, Hollie-Mae Dodd well-timed a short run to the line to score a converted try for the Raiders, again narrowing the Roosters’ lead to six points (16 to 10). The Roosters defence subsequently held, and with two and a half minutes remaining Roosters halfback Tarryn Aiken sped through a gap to score her team’s fourth try and secure victory.

The Brisbane Broncos entered the 2026 season as defending premiers. They won their first five games, four of them by a margin of 18 points or more. In Round Six, a second successive away trip saw the Broncos stumble against the Canberra Raiders, losing 4 to 28 to a club that was improving upon their 2025 efforts. The Broncos then hosted the Roosters in their first meeting since the 2025 Grand Final. The Broncos led by ten points at halftime but the Roosters staged a comeback, scoring six tries to one in the second stanza to win by fourteen points. A third successive loss came against the Gold Coast Titans, who won their seventh match in a row.

A try in the opening minute provided a perfect start to the Broncos next match against the Parramatta Eels. A further six Broncos tries were scored before the Eels made a belated reply. After an eight-pint win in Wollongong, the Broncos briefly trailed in their last round match, hosting the Warriors, before seven second half tries saw them win by 34 points. By the same margin (34 points), the Broncos led at half-time the Elimination Final they hosted against the Newcastle Knights. With both teams scoring sixteen points in the second half, the margin remained the same at fulltime.

A dummy, step and stretch by their captain Tamika Upton saw the Broncos opening the scoring with a try five minutes into their Preliminary Final against the second-placed Gold Coast Titans. Within four further minutes, the Broncos registered a second converted try as an angled run by Romy Teitzel found a gap in the Titans tryline defence. Although the Titans soon replied with a try on their left wing, and found better field position for a while, the Broncos scored two tries in the last five minutes of the first half. Left edge forward Lauren Dam twirled out of a tackle to score the Broncos’ third try. A 30 metre movement with four short runs and as many passes saw right wing Julia Robinson touchdown. The Broncos led 20 to 4 at the break.

Although the Titans scored their second try midway through the second stanza, the Broncos defence held on from then on, to secure a place in their sixth grand final.

Going into 2026 Grand Final the Sydney Roosters had won just one match more than the Brisbane Broncos across their respective nine seasons. Both teams had each lost 18 just NRLW matches. Combined, the two clubs had won six of the league's eight premierships. The Roosters 52 wins to the Broncos’ 51 wins yielded the slightly better win percentage, 74.29% to 73.91%. The record between the teams favoured the Brisbane Broncos with seven wins to six by the Sydney Roosters with an overall difference of 12 points (Broncos 254 to Roosters 242). The Broncos defeated the Roosters in their first five meetings (2018 Round 2 & Grand Final, 2019, 2020 Round 3 & Grand Final, 2021 Round 1). The Roosters had won the six of the last seven matches against the Broncos (2021 Semi-Final, 2022, 2023, 2024, 2025 Round 3, and 2026 Round 7).

Route to the Grand Final
Team	Regular season											Finals	
Team	1	2	3	4	5	6	7	8	9	10	11	EF	PF
Sydney Roosters	34–10	12–10	22–18	48–10	38–8	46–6	34–20	66–8	36–8	56–6	42–12	Bye	20–10
Sydney Roosters	A	H(S)	A	A	N	H(G)	A	H(S)	H(S)	A	H(S)	Bye	H(S)
Brisbane Broncos	50–4	22–16	40–12	30–12	34–4	4–28	20–34	20–28	44–10	24–16	52–18	40–16	20–8
Brisbane Broncos	H(SS)	A	H(TWS)	H(TWS)	N	A	H(SS)	A	A	A	H(TWS)	H(TWS)	A
Key: H(G) = Home venue - Gosford; H(S) = Home venue - Sydney; H(SS) = Home venue - Suncorp Stadium, Brisbane; H(TWS) = Home venue - Totally Workwear Stadium; A = Away venue; N = Neutral venue

== Pre-match ==
=== Entertainment ===
Bachelor Girl performed during the prematch

Australian band Bachelor Girl performed three songs before the match, including their 1998 hit “Buses and Trains.”

=== Broadcasting ===
The match will be broadcast live on the Nine Network in Australia and 9Now and on Sky Sport in New Zealand. Radio broadcasters include ABC, Triple M, 2GB, 4BC and NRL Nation.

=== Officiating ===
Belinda Sharpe was appointed as the referee for the NRLW Grand Final for the fifth time, having previously done so in the 2020 season, the postponed 2021 season and the 2023 and 2025 seasons. Wyatt Raymond was appointed as the video referee in the NRL Bunker. Karra-Lee Nolan and Rochelle Tamarua were appointed as the touch judges.

Match Officials
Position		Standby
Referee	Belinda Sharpe	Kasey Badger
Touch Judges	Karra-Lee Nolan, Rochelle Tamarua	Kasey Badger
Bunker Review Official	Wyatt Raymond	—N/a

== Squads ==
Initial team lists of 22 players were announced on the Tuesday afternoon prior to match, 29 September 2026.

Sydney Roosters
Pos	J#	Player	Age	Matches			
Pos	J#	Player	Age	NRLW		Representative	
Pos	J#	Player	Age	2026	Career	State	Tests
FB	1	Corban Baxter	32	12	43	10	7
WG	2	Brydie Parker	26	12	53	—	—
CE	3	Jessica Sergis	29	12	58	16	14
CE	4	Isabelle Kelly	30	12	67	19	20
WG	5	Jayme Fressard	29	9	46	6	—
FE	6	Jocelyn Kelleher	26	12	63	6	—
HB	7	Tarryn Aiken	27	10	55	11	10
PR	8	Millie Elliott	28	12	50	12	4
HK	9	Keeley Nizza	26	12	68	13	9
PR	10	Otesa Pule	23	12	52	3	13
SR	11	Sariah Paki	24	12	12	—	—
SR	12	Jasmin Strange	23	12	48	—	—
LK	13	Olivia Kernick	25	12	59	12	10
IN	14	Taina Naividi	25	8	30	—	2
IN	15	Aliyah Nasio	20	9	25	—	—
IN	16	Rima Butler	28	11	44	2	3
IN	17	Amber Hall	31	8	48	—	14
CS	18	Mia Wood	27	4	31	—	—
—	19	Taneisha Gray	21	2	4	—	—
—	20	Nikiah Campbell	25	0	0	—	—
—	21	Shawden Burton	26	5	25	—	—
—	22	Keighley Simpson	21	1	4	—	—

Brisbane Broncos
Pos	J#	Player	Age	Matches			
Pos	J#	Player	Age	NRLW		Representative	
Pos	J#	Player	Age	2026	Career	State	Tests
FB	1	Tamika Upton	29	13	63	12	8
WG	2	Kerri Johnson	23	12	25	—	—
CE	3	Deleni Paitai	18	10	10	—	2
CE	4	Georgia Bartlett	—	13	13	—	—
WG	5	Julia Robinson	28	13	59	12	13
FE	6	Ali Brigginshaw	36	10	66	20	29
HB	7	Jesse Southwell	21	13	53	8	3
PR	8	Shannon Mato	28	13	44	8	9
HK	9	Jada Ferguson	24	12	51	5	—
PR	10	Brianna Clark	31	11	48	2	9
SR	11	Lauren Dam	29	13	43	—	—
SR	12	Romy Teitzel	27	13	58	11	—
LK	13	Lillian Yarrow	22	12	27	1	—
IN	14	Rhemy Hinckesman	—	11	11	—	—
IN	15	Chelsea Lenarduzzi	30	13	68	9	1
IN	16	Reegan Hicks	20	6	10	—	—
IN	17	Harlem Walker	18	9	9	—	—
CS	18	Caitlin Urwin	26	8	8	—	—
—	19	Tara McGrath-West	25	1	17	—	—
—	20	Linneke Gevers	28	0	0	—	4
—	21	Breanna Eales	35	0	18	—	—
—	22	Amanii Misa	19	0	0	—	—

Notes:

- Both teams initially named an unchanged set of players in jerseys 1 to 18 who had participated in their respective preliminary final matches.
  - Roosters winger Jayme Fressard was under an injury cloud after hurting her shoulder against the Raiders and not completing the match. Fressard undertook and passed a fitness test on the morning of Saturday, 3 October.
  - The Roosters made a change in the reserves, naming Keighley Simpson who had injured her knee in Round 1.
  - The Broncos shuffled two of their reserves, naming Linneke Gevers and Tara McGrath-West rather than Skyla Adams and Tavarna Papalii.
- Three Broncos players were unavailable due to injury: Shalom Sauaso (ACL, incurred preseason), Destiny Brill (calf, incurred in Round 8, played two matches), and Bree Spreadborough (lower leg fracture, incurred in the elimination final, played 12 matches). Brill and Sauaso had played for the Broncos in the 2025 Grand Final. Hayley Maddick, who also played in the 2025 Grand Final, was unavailable for the 2026 season due to pregnancy.
- Five other 2025 Grand Final winners had departed the Broncos for other clubs in 2026: Mele Hufanga, Gayle Broughton, and Annetta Nu'uausala went to the Warriors, Keilee Joseph to the Eels and Shenae Ciesiolka to the Dragons.
- One Roosters player was unavailable due to injury: Macie Carlile (knee, played three matches).
- The top two point scorers in the 2026 season were named to play, with Jesse Southwell (Broncos) on 114 points (from one try and 55 goals) and Jocelyn Kelleher on 102 points (from one try and 49 goals).
  - The same players were also the top two all-time leading point scorers in NRLW matches. Jocelyn Kelleher was on top having scored 369 points from eight tries, 168 goals, and one field goal in 63 matches. Jesse Southwell was following with 346 points from eight tries and 157 goals in 53 matches.
- The goal-kicking conversion rates for the 2026 season were:
  - Jocelyn Kelleher (Roosters) 65.33% having kicked 49 conversions from 75 attempts.
  - Tarryn Aiken (Roosters) 54.55% having kicked six conversions from eleven attempts.
  - Jesse Southwell (Broncos) 76.39% having kicked 54 conversions and one penalty goal from 72 attempts.
  - Ali Brigginshaw (Broncos) kicked one conversion from a single attempt.
  - The Broncos’ primary goal-kicker of the previous season, Romy Teitzel (63.16% in 2025) had, so far, not attempted to kick a goal during the 2026 season.
- The top two try scorers in the 2026 season were named to play, with Jessica Sergis (Roosters) on 17 tries leading second placed Tamika Upton (Broncos) on 15 tries. In extended list of top try scorers for the 2026 season (prior to the Grand Final) were
  - In 4th-place was Roosters left winger Jayme Fressard with 12 tries in nine matches.
  - In equal 5th-placed with 11 tries, were Roosters right winger Brydie Parker and Broncos left winger Kerri Johnson. Both had played 12 matches.

== Match summary ==
2026 NRL Women's Premiership Grand Final

Sunday, 4 October
16:00 AEDT (UTC+11)

Sydney Roosters	30 – 6	Brisbane Broncos
Tries: 7 Parker 4', 26', 56'; Aiken 16'; Kelly 20'; Fressard 22'; Hall 31'; Goals: 1 Kelleher 17' (1/7)	1st: 26–0; 2nd: 4–6; Match Centre	Tries: 1 Southwell 63'; Goals: 1 Southwell 65' (1/1)

Accor Stadium, Sydney
Attendance: 47,451
Referee: Belinda Sharpe
Video referee: Wyatt Raymond
Touch judges: Karra-Lee Nolan, Rochelle Tamarua
Karyn Murphy Medal: Tarryn Aiken (Sydney)

Notes:

- Brydie Parker and Tamika Upton became the first two players to appear in six NRLW Grand finals.
  - Parker's trio of tries was her third such hattrick in the 2026 season.
  - Parker's tally of Grand Final tries increased to six (2018: 0, 2020: 0, 2021: 0, 2024: 2, 2025: 1, 2026: 3).
  - Although providing a run and pass to assist with the Broncos only try, Upton was unable to extend upon her sequence of five Grand Final tries in as many matches (2019: 0, 2020: 1, 2022: 1, 2023: 2, 2025: 1, 2026: 0).

+ Millie Elliott play in her fifth Grand Final, all wins.

- Ali Brigginshaw, Chelsea Lenarduzzi, and Julia Robinson played in their fifth Grand Final and first loss, all for the Broncos.
- Isabelle Kelly and Jocelyn Kelleher played in their fifth Grand Final, all for the Roosters. Keeley Davis (Dragons 2, Roosters 3) and Jessica Sergis (Dragons 1, Roosters 4) made their fifth Grand Final appearance.
- The 24 points deficit was the Broncos equal biggest loss in their 70th NRLW match. The previous instance had come in their 4–28 loss away to the Canberra Raiders earlier in the 2026 season (Round 5).
