= 2024 NRL Women's Grand Final =

NRLW Grand Final

2024 NRL Women's Premiership Grand Final

Sydney Roosters	Cronulla-Sutherland Sharks
32	28
	1	2	Total
SYD	24	8	32
CRO	0	28	28
- Date: 6 October 2024
- Stadium: Accor Stadium
- Location: Sydney, New South Wales, Australia
- Karyn Murphy Medal: Tarryn Aiken
- Referee: Ziggy Przeklasa-Adamski
- Attendance: 40,623

Broadcast partners
- Broadcasters: Nine Network

The 2024 NRL Women's Premiership Grand Final was the conclusive and premiership-deciding game of the 2024 National Rugby League Women's season in Australia. It was contested between the Sydney Roosters and the Cronulla-Sutherland Sharks on 6 October at Accor Stadium in Sydney.

The match was preceded by the 2024 NRL State Championship and followed by the National Rugby League grand final. The match was broadcast live throughout Australia by the Nine Network.

== Background ==
The 2024 NRL Women's season was the 7th season of semi-professional women's rugby league in Australia. The season consisted of nine competition rounds, followed by semi-finals contested by the top four teams on the competition ladder.

The Sydney Roosters finished second on the 2024 ladder with a record of seven wins, two losses and a points difference of 110. The Brisbane Broncos had the same win-loss record as the Roosters but a slightly higher points difference of 116 gave them the minor premiership. The Roosters hosted the third-placed Newcastle Knights in a semi-final at Allianz Stadium. Scoring four of the five first half tries the Roosters led the Knights 22–4 at the break. A penalty goal early in the second stanza extended the Roosters’ lead to 20 points. The Knights scored their second try with ten minutes left on the game clock. The Roosters countered with a field goal before the Knights scored a third try in the penultimate minute. The Roosters prevailed 25–16, eliminating the twice defending premiers.

The Cronulla-Sutherland Sharks finished fourth on the ladder with a record of six consecutive wins to start the season, followed by three consecutive losses to end the regular season. The Newcastle Knights had the same win-loss record as the Sharks but a better points difference, 106 to 24. The Sharks travelled to Totally Workwear Stadium in inner south-eastern suburban Brisbane to play the Brisbane Broncos. The Sharks scored the only try of the first half in the 13th minue to lead six-nil at the break. A second but unconverted try two minutes into the second stanza extended the Sharks’ lead to ten-nil. After a third try, also unconverted, the Sharks held on for the last twelve minutes of the game to win, 14–0.

The Sydney Roosters had lost NRLW Grand Finals in the short 2018 and 2020 seasons. At their third NRLW Grand Final appearance in the postponed 2021 season in April 2022, the Roosters claimed their first Grand Final win and premiership.

The Cronulla-Sutherland Sharks made the NRLW Grand Final for the first time in their second season.

Going into 2024 Grand Final, the Sydney Roosters had won 27 NRLW matches across their seven seasons with a win percentage of 61.36% from 44 matches. The Cronulla-Sutherland Sharks had won 11 NRLW matches in their two seasons with a win percentage of 57.89% from 19 matches. The record between the teams strongly favoured the Sydney Roosters who had won both competition games, 36–12 in Round 4 of 2023 and 40–0 in Round 7 of 2024.

Route to the Grand Final
Team	Regular season									Semi-Finals
Team	1	2	3	4	5	6	7	8	9	Semi-Finals
Sydney Roosters	10–12	28–12	20–4	28–8	6–26	34–20	40–0	24–12	32–18	25–16
Sydney Roosters	A	H(S)	H(G)	A	A	H(S)	A	H(G)	A	H(S)
Cronulla-Sutherland Sharks	14–0	18–16	24–12	14–12	28–4	22–6	0–40	16–20	10–12	14–0
Cronulla-Sutherland Sharks	H	A	A	H	A	A	H	A	H	A
Key: H(G) = Home venue - Gosford; H(S) = Home venue - Sydney; H = Home venue (Sharks); A = Away venue; N = Neutral venue

== Pre-match ==
=== Broadcasting ===
The match was broadcast live on the Nine Network in Australia and 9Now and on Sky Sport in New Zealand. Radio broadcasters included ABC, Triple M, 2GB, 4BC and NRL Nation.

=== Officiating ===
Ziggy Przeklasa-Adamski was appointed as the referee for the NRLW Grand Final for the first time. Kasey Badger was appointed as the video referee in the NRL Bunker. Karra-Lee Nolan and Rochelle Tamarua were appointed as the touch judges.

== Squads ==
Initial team lists of 22 players were announced on the Tuesday afternoon prior to match, 1 October 2024.

Sydney Roosters
Pos	J#	Player	Age	Matches			
Pos	J#	Player	Age	NRLW		Representative	
Pos	J#	Player	Age	2024	Career	State	Tests
FB	1	Samantha Bremner	32	9	18	6	10
WG	2	Jayme Fressard	27	8	28	—	—
CE	3	Jessica Sergis	27	4	32	10	7
CE	4	Isabelle Kelly	28	10	42	13	13
WG	5	Brydie Parker	24	4	27	—	—
FE	6	Jocelyn Kelleher	24	10	37	—	—
HB	7	Tarryn Aiken	25	8	37	8	6
PR	8	Millie Elliott	26	9	37	9	1
HK	9	Keeley Davis	24	10	42	7	6
PR	10	Otesa Pule	21	10	26	—	8
SR	11	Amber Hall	29	9	28	—	11
SR	12	Olivia Kernick	23	10	33	6	6
LK	13	Tiana Davison	23	7	15	—	2
IN	14	Tavarna Papalii	19	7	7	—	—
IN	15	Jasmin Strange	21	10	22	—	—
IN	16	Samantha Economos	30	6	12	—	—
IN	17	Kalosipani Hopoate	20	10	23	—	1
CS	18	Mia Wood	25	9	14	—	—
—	19	Mya Hill-Moana	22	6	25	—	10
—	20	Taina Naividi	23	6	11	—	—
—	21	Eliza Lopamaua	19	4	4	—	—
—	22	Shannon Rose	27	0	1	—	—

Cronulla-Sutherland Sharks
Pos	J#	Player	Age	Matches			
Pos	J#	Player	Age	NRLW		Representative	
Pos	J#	Player	Age	2024	Career	State	Tests
FB	1	Emma Tonegato	29	8	30	8	9
WG	2	Cassie Staples	31	10	16	—	1
CE	3	Tiana Penitani	28	10	35	8	1 1
CE	4	Annessa Biddle		10	18	—	3
WG	5	Georgia Ravics		10	15	—	—
FE	6	Georgia Hannaway	23	6	6	—	—
HB	7	Tayla Preston	25	10	25	—	—
PR	8	Ellie Johnston	23	10	34	—	—
HK	9	Quincy Dodd	24	10	37	5	—
PR	17	Tegan Dymock	22	10	24	—	2
SR	11	Talei Holmes	24	9	28	—	2
SR	12	Rhiannon Byers	25	9	10	—	—
LK	13	Brooke Anderson	28	10	24	1	3
IN	14	Filomina Hanisi	23	3	23	2	—
IN	15	Manilita Takapautolo	18	6	6	—	—
IN	16	Vanessa Foliaki	31	10	37	6	6 1
IN	10	Holli Wheeler	34	9	36	3	5
CS	19	Nakia Davis-Welsh	28	4	6	3	4
—	18	Chloe Saunders	25	9	18	—	—
—	20	Dominique du Toit	27	1	1	—	—
—	21	Sharni Smale	36	4	4	—	—
—	22	Leki Leilua		0	0	—	—

Notes:

- Shawden Burton and Corban Baxter were unavailable for the Sydney Roosters due to ACL injuries incurred, respectively, during pre-season training and in the Roosters’ trial match.
- Jessica Sergis had returned to the Roosters team on the interchange bench in the semi-final after missing the last six rounds due to injury. Sergis was promoted to the starting side for the Grand Final.
- Jada Taylor (ACL) and Grace-Lee Weekes (Syndesmosis) were unavailable for the Cronulla-Sutherland Sharks due to injuries incurred prior to round 3.
- The Cronulla-Sutherland Sharks named a squad with just one change from their semi-final, Tegan Dymock replacing Chloe Sauders.
- Going into the Grand Final, Jocelyn Kelleher was the leading point scorer for the 2024 season with 70 points from one try and 33 goals. Cronulla’s top point scorer, Tayla Preston, was ninth on the list with 36 points from 18 goals.
- The goal-kicking conversion rates for the 2024 season prior to the match were:
  - Jocelyn Kelleher (Roosters) 73.33% having kicked 32 conversions and one penalty goal from 45 attempts.
  - Tayla Preston (Sharks) 56.25% having kicked 17 conversions and one penalty goal from 32 attempts.
- Going into the match, the Grand Final participant placed highest in the 2024 top try scorers list was Tiana Penitani. Penitani was in equal fifth place with seven tries from ten matches. By scoring two tries in the Grand Final, Penitani moved to equal first in the list, joining Sheridan Gallagher and Julia Robinson on nine tries for the season.
  - Sam Bremner was the highest placed Roosters player going into the match, in equal eighth place with six tries. Bremner was joined on six tries for the season by her teammates by Jayme Fressard and Olivia Kernick following their tries in the Grand Final.

== Match summary ==
The Roosters won their second premiership.

2024 NRL Women's Premiership Grand Final

Sunday, 6 October
3:55pm AEDT (UTC+11)

Sydney Roosters	32—28	Cronulla-Sutherland Sharks
Tries: 6 Olivia Kernick 2 (15', 66'); Brydie Parker 2 (21', 26'); Jayme Fressard (18'); Jessica Sergis (34'); Goals: 4 Jocelyn Kelleher 4/7 (16', 35', pen 52', 67')	1st: 24–0; 2nd: 8–28	Tries: 5 Tiana Penitani 2 (38', 68'); Quincy Dodd (43'); Georgia Hannaway (48'); Ellie Johnston (61'); Goals: 4 Tayla Preston 4/5 (39', 44', 50', 62')

Accor Stadium, Sydney
Attendance: 40,623
Referee: Ziggy Przeklasa-Adamski
Video referee: Kasey Badger
Touch judges: Karra-Lee Nolan, Rochelle Tamarua
Karyn Murphy Medal: Tarryn Aiken
Official NRL Website: Match Centre
Highlights: YouTube by NRL on Nine
