= 2025 NRL Women's Grand Final =

NRLW Grand Final

2025 NRL Women's Premiership Grand Final
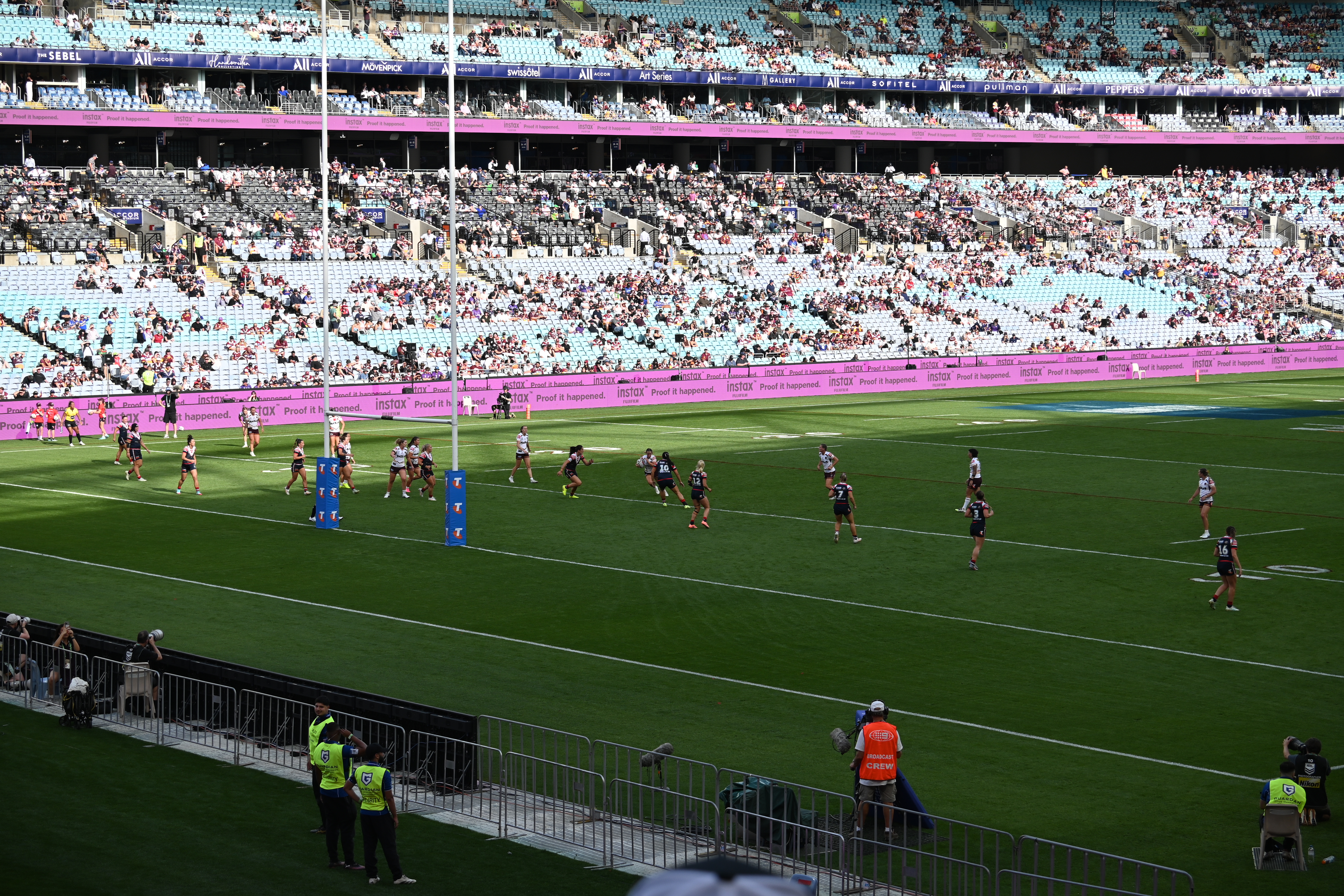
- The match was played at Accor Stadium

Sydney Roosters	Brisbane Broncos
18	22
	1	2	Total
SYD	0	18	18
BRI	12	10	22
- Date: 5 October 2025
- Stadium: Accor Stadium
- Location: Sydney, New South Wales, Australia
- Karyn Murphy Medal: Mele Hufanga
- Pre-Match Entertainment: Sarah Berki
- Referee: Belinda Sharpe
- Attendance: 46,288

Broadcast partners
- Broadcasters: Nine Network

The 2025 NRL Women's Premiership Grand Final was the conclusive and premiership-deciding game of the 2025 National Rugby League Women's season in Australia. It was contested between the Sydney Roosters and the Brisbane Broncos on 5 October at Accor Stadium in Sydney with Brisbane Broncos Women winning 22-18.

The match was preceded by the 2025 NRL State Championship and followed by the National Rugby League grand final. The match was broadcast live throughout Australia by the Nine Network.

== Background ==
The 2025 NRL Women's season is the 8th season of semi-professional women's rugby league in Australia. The season consisted of 11 competition rounds, followed by a finals series contested by the top six teams on the competition ladder.

The Sydney Roosters finished first on the 2025 ladder with an undefeated record. The National Rugby League introduced a new award, Nellie Doherty Shield, for the NRLW minor premiership and the Roosters were the inaugural winners. Receiving a bye in the first week of the finals series, the Roosters hosted the fifth-placed Cronulla-Sutherland Sharks in a preliminary final at Polytec Stadium. The Roosters led 10–6 at half time and 16–6 after a converted try five minutes into the second stanza. Tries by Cronulla with 13 and nine minutes left on the game clock levelled the scores at 16-all. A field goal by Jocelyn Kelleher put the Roosters in front, 17–16, with three minutes remaining. The Roosters held on to advance to a consecutive grand final.

The Brisbane Broncos entered the 2025 season having lost grand final qualifying semi-finals in the previous two seasons. The Broncos lost just one match during the 2025 regular season, their Round 3 clash with the Sydney Roosters. Receiving a bye in the first week of the finals series, the Broncos hosted the third-placed Newcastle Knights in a preliminary final at Suncorp Stadium. The Broncos scored two tries in the first seven minutes, and a third and fourth try by the 25th minute. Whilst the Knights responded with a converted try in the 27th minute, the Broncos scored the only try of the second stanza to win, 30–6, and advance to the Grand Final.

The Brisbane Broncos had won the first three NRLW Grand Finals, in 2018, 2019, and 2020 but had not appeared since. The Broncos' first and third Grand Finals wins were over the Sydney Roosters. Following their Grand Final losses in 2018 and 2020, the Sydney Roosters appeared in and won the postponed 2021 season Grand Final in April 2022. The Roosters won their second premiership in 2024.

Going into 2025 Grand Final both the Brisbane Broncos and Sydney Roosters had won 40 NRLW matches across their eight seasons, the Broncos having the slightly better win percentage, 72.73% to 70.18%, as they had played two fewer matches (Broncos 55 to Roosters 57). The record between the teams favoured the Brisbane Broncos with six wins to five by the Sydney Roosters with an overall difference of 22 points (Broncos 212 to Roosters 190). The Broncos defeated the Roosters in their first five meetings (2018 Round 2 & Grand Final, 2019, 2020 Round 3 & Grand Final, 2021 Round 1). The Roosters had won the last five matches against the Broncos (2021 Semi-Final, 2022, 2023, 2024, 2025 Round 3).

Route to the Grand Final
Team	Regular season											Finals	
Team	1	2	3	4	5	6	7	8	9	10	11	EF	PF
Sydney Roosters	30–6	24–10	30–26	42–22	34–4	24–8	30–14	56–12	30–0	26–14	40–10	Bye	17–16
Sydney Roosters	H(S)	A	A	H(S)	N	A	H(G)	A	A	H(S)	H(G)	Bye	H(G)
Brisbane Broncos	28–4	44–4	26–30	30–6	28–14	44–28	38–4	46–16	44–0	26–6	50–4	Bye	30–6
Brisbane Broncos	H(TWS)	A	H(TWS)	A	N	A	H(SS)	A	H(TWS)	A	H(TWS)	Bye	H(SS)
Key: H(G) = Home venue - Gosford; H(S) = Home venue - Sydney; H(SS) = Home venue - Suncorp Stadium, Brisbane; H(TWS) = Home venue - Totally Workwear Stadium; A = Away venue; N = Neutral venue

== Pre-match ==
=== Broadcasting ===
The match was broadcast live on the Nine Network in Australia and 9Now and on Sky Sport in New Zealand. Radio broadcasters included ABC, Triple M, 2GB, 4BC and NRL Nation.

=== Officiating ===
Belinda Sharpe was appointed as the referee for the NRLW Grand Final for the fourth time, having previously done so in the 2020 season, the postponed 2021 season and the 2023 season. Chris Butler was appointed as the video referee in the NRL Bunker. Ethan Klein and Rochelle Tamarua were appointed as the touch judges.

== Squads ==
Initial team lists of 22 players were announced on the Tuesday afternoon prior to match, 30 September 2025. The Brisbane Broncos game day line-up was unchanged. For the Sydney Roosters, Amber Hall, was included in the 17 the day prior, but dropped out on game day. Taina Naividi was injured in training on the Saturday. Mia Wood came into the starting thirteen. Jayde Herdegen was added to the seventeen but did not take the field.

Sydney Roosters
Pos	J#	Player	Age	Matches			
Pos	J#	Player	Age	NRLW		Representative	
Pos	J#	Player	Age	2025	Career	State	Tests
FB	1	Brydie Parker	25	12	40	—	—
WG	16	Mia Wood	26	12	26	—	—
CE	3	Jessica Sergis	28	12	45	13	11
CE	4	Isabelle Kelly	29	11	54	16	17
WG	5	Jayme Fressard	28	7	36	3	—
FE	6	Corban Baxter	31	8	30	10	—
HB	7	Jocelyn Kelleher	25	12	50	3	—
PR	8	Otesa Pule	22	12	39	—	10
HK	9	Keeley Davis	25	12	55	10	7
PR	10	Rima Butler	27	12	32	—	—
SR	11	Aliyah Nasio	19	11	15	—	—
SR	12	Jasmin Strange	22	12	35	—	—
LK	13	Olivia Kernick	24	12	46	9	7
IN	14	Shawden Burton	25	6	19	—	—
IN	15	Macie Carlile	24	11	14	—	—
IN	17	Eliza Lopamaua	20	10	14	—	—
IN	18	Jayde Herdegen	21	0	0	—	—
CS	20	Taneisha Gray	20	2	2	—	—
—	21	Imogen Hei	19	0	0	—	—
—	22	Tavarna Papalii	20	0	8	3	3
—	2	Taina Naividi	24	11	22	—	2
—	19	Amber Hall	30	11	40	—	14

Brisbane Broncos
Pos	J#	Player	Age	Matches			
Pos	J#	Player	Age	NRLW		Representative	
Pos	J#	Player	Age	2025	Career	State	Tests
FB	1	Tamika Upton	28	12	49	10	6
WG	2	Kerri Johnson	22	12	12	—	—
CE	3	Mele Hufanga	30	12	32	—	1 10
CE	4	Julia Robinson	27	11	45	10	10
WG	5	Hayley Maddick	33	12	41	1	—
FE	6	Gayle Broughton	29	12	35	—	3
HB	7	Ali Brigginshaw	35	12	55	20	26
PR	8	Annetta Nu'uausala	30	10	34	—	14 4
HK	9	Jada Ferguson	23	12	38	2	—
PR	10	Brianna Clark	30	10	36	1	8
SR	11	Lauren Dam	28	10	29	—	—
SR	12	Romy Teitzel	26	12	44	8	—
LK	13	Keilee Joseph	23	12	44	6	6
IN	14	Destiny Brill	22	10	40	8	3
IN	15	Chelsea Lenarduzzi	29	12	54	8	1
IN	16	Shenae Ciesiolka	28	7	39	11	3
IN	17	Shalom Sauaso	18	9	9	—	—
CS	18	Reegan Hicks	19	4	4	—	—
—	19	Azalleyah Maaka	25	2	2	—	—
—	20	Bree Spreadborough	27	5	7	—	—
—	21	Tafito Lafaele	24	1	14	—	—
—	22	Skyla Adams	20	1	3	—	—

Notes:

- Tarryn Aiken, the winner of the Karyn Murphy Medal as player of the match in the 2024 NRLW Grand Final, was unavailable for the Sydney Roosters due to incurring an ACL injury in their Round 11 match.
- Taina Naividi incurred an injury during their Sydney Roosters "captain's run" training session on Saturday, 4 October, prior to the match on Sunday and was withdrawn. Mia Wood wasshifted from the interchange bench to the wing to replace Naividi.
- The Roosters had named Amber Hall in the reserves in the initial team list after she incurred a calf injury in their Round 11 match and played just 10 minutes in their Preliminary Final. Hall passed a fitness test on the eve of the match and was named to fill the gap on the interchange bench created by Naividi's withdrawal and Wood's promotion into the starting 13.
- Aliyah Nasio returned to the Roosters line up having missed the Preliminary Final due to serving a one match suspension. Taina Naividi moves back to the wing, and Mia Wood goes back to the bench.
- The Brisbane Broncos named a squad unchanged from their Preliminary Final, other than Bree Spreadborough replacing Tara McGrath-West in the reserves.
- The top two point scorers in the 2025 season are named to play, with Romy Teitzel (Broncos) on 112 points (from four tries and 48 goals) leading Jocelyn Kelleher (Roosters) on 99 points (one try, 47 goals, one field goal).
  - Jocelyn Kelleher became the NRLW's all time leading point scorer during the 2025 season, passing former Roosters and current Raiders player, Zahara Temara. Going into the Grand Final, Kelleher had scored 261 points from seven tries, 116 goals and one field goal (kicked to win the preceding Preliminary Final) in 50 matches.
- The goal-kicking conversion rates for the 2025 season:
  - Jocelyn Kelleher (Roosters) 64.38% having kicked 46 conversions and one penalty goal from 73 attempts.
  - Romy Teitzel (Broncos) 63.16% having kicked 48 conversions from 76 attempts.
  - Brianna Clark (Broncos) 71.43% having kicked four conversions and one penalty goal from seven attempts (whilst Teitzel was on the interchange bench).
- Two of the top three try scorers in the 2025 season are named to play, with Tamika Upton (Broncos) on 19 tries leadng third-placed Taina Naividi (Roosters) on 11 tries.
  - Tamika Upton became the NRLW's all time leading try scorer during the 2025 season, passing Teagan Berry (Dragons). Going into the Grand Final, Upton had scored 45 tries from 49 matches and was seventh on the all time point scorers list on her try scoring alone, not having kicked a goal or field goal.
  - Payton Takimoana (Warriors) was the second-placed try scorer in the 2025 season, with 15 tries from 11 matches.
- Two of the players named are amongst five who have played in four NRLW Grand Finals
  - Tamika Upton (Broncos) has won all four Grand Finals in which she has played, for the Broncos (2019,2020) and (Knights 2022, 2023).
  - Brydie Parker (Roosters) has appeared in all four Grand Finals for the Sydney Roosters, losing two (2018, 2020) and winning two (2021, 2024).
- Jasmin Strange played in and won the previous two Grand Finals (2023 Knights, 2024 Roosters).
- Four players have previously played for the opposing club
  - Current Roosters previously Broncos: Jayme Fressard (2020 Premiers), Amber Hall (2019 Premiers, 2020 Premiers, 2021, 2022).
  - Current Broncos previously Roosters: Keilee Joseph (2021 Premiers, 2022, 2023), Destiny Brill (2022).
- Olivia Kernick (Roosters) has scored five tries in six games against the Broncos.

== Match summary ==
2025 NRL Women's Premiership Grand Final

Sunday, 5 October
16:00 AEDT (UTC+11)

Sydney Roosters	18 – 22	Brisbane Broncos
Tries: 3 Parker 46'; Lopamaua 51'; Wood 54'; Goals: 3 Kelleher 48', 53', 56' (3/3)	1st: 0–12; 2nd: 18–10; Report; Highlights	Tries: 4 Upton 18'; Ferguson 29'; Sauaso 61'; Hufanga 66'; Goals: 3 Teitzel 20', 31' (2/3); Clarke 66' (1/1)

Accor Stadium, Sydney
Attendance: 46,288
Referee: Belinda Sharpe
Video referee: Chris Butler
Touch judges: Ethan Klein, Rochelle Tamarua
Karyn Murphy Medal: Mele Hufanga (Brisbane)

Notes:

- The opposing fullbacks, Brydie Parker and Tamika Upton became the first two players to appear in five NRLW Grand finals.
  - They each opened the scoring for their team in this match.
  - Upton's record extended to five Grand Final wins from five appearances, across seven seasons.
  - Upton's try was her fifth in Grand Finals (2019: 0, 2020: 1, 2022: 1, 2023: 2, 2025: 1).
- Ali Brigginshaw, Chelsea Lenarduzzi, and Julia Robinson played in their fourth Grand Final win, all for the Broncos.
- Isabelle Kelly and Jocelyn Kelleher played in their fourth Grand Final, all for the Roosters. Keeley Davis (Dragons 2, Roosters 2) and Jessica Sergis (Dragons 1, Roosters 3) made their fourth Grand Final appearance.
- Jayde Herdegen was included on the interchange bench to make her debut in the seventeen named by the Roosters but did not take the field.
- Aliyah Nasio was placed on report for striking in a melee that occurred immediately after fulltime. Nasio would be suspended for a record four matches for her role in the melee.
