= 2021 NRL Women's Grand Final =

NRLW Grand Final

2021 NRL Women's Premiership Grand Final

St. George Illawarra Dragons	Sydney Roosters
4	16
	1	2	Total
SGI	4	0	4
SYD	0	16	16
- Date: 10 April 2021
- Stadium: Moreton Daily Stadium
- Location: Redcliffe, Brisbane, Queensland, Australia
- Karyn Murphy Medal: Sarah Togatuki
- Referee: Belinda Sharpe
- Attendance: 7,855

Broadcast partners
- Broadcasters: Nine Network

The 2021 NRL Women's Premiership Grand Final was the conclusive and premiership-deciding game of the postponed 2021 National Rugby League Women's season in Australia. It was contested between the St. George Illawarra Dragons and the Sydney Roosters on 10 April 2022 at Moreton Daily Stadium in Redcliffe a seaside suburb of Brisbane, Queensland.

The match was preceded by an Under 19 women’s match. The match was broadcast live throughout Australia by the Nine Network.

== Background ==
The 2021 NRL Women's season was the 4th season of semi-professional women's rugby league in Australia. The season was planned to start in August 2021, postponed to October 2021 and further postponed to 2022 due to the ongoing COVID-19 pandemic. The season commenced in late February 2022 and consisted of five competition rounds, followed by semi-finals contested by the top four teams on the competition ladder.

The two semi-finals were scheduled as a double-header at Leichhardt Oval in Sydney.

The St. George Illawarra Dragons finished second on the 2021 ladder with a record of four wins and one loss. This matched the record of the Brisbane Broncos but the Dragons’ point difference of 55 was inferior to the Broncos’ 70. The Dragons played the Gold Coast Titans, who had finished third in their inaugural season with a record of three wins and two losses.

Route to the Grand Final
Team	Regular season					Semi-Finals
Team	1	2	3	4	5	Semi-Finals
St. George Illawarra Dragons	20–12	10–0	18–22	40–4	16–10	24–18
St. George Illawarra Dragons	N	H	N	A	H	N
Sydney Roosters	4–20	16–26	28–12	19–18	10–16	22–16
Sydney Roosters	N	N	H	N	A	N
Key: H = Home venue; A = Away venue; N = Neutral venue

== Pre-match ==
=== Broadcasting ===
The match was broadcast live on the Nine Network in Australia and 9Now and on Sky Sport in New Zealand. Radio broadcasters included ABC, Triple M, 2GB, 4BC and NRL Nation.

=== Officiating ===
Belinda Sharpe was appointed as the referee for the NRLW Grand Final for the second time. Sharpe had refereed the previous, 2020 NRLW Grand Final. Matt Noyen was appointed as the video referee in the NRL Bunker. Kasey Badger and Karra-Lee Nolan were appointed as the touch judges.

== Squads ==
Initial team lists of 24 players were announced on the Tuesday afternoon prior to match, 5 April 2022.

St. George Illawarra Dragons
Pos	J#	Player	Age	Matches			
Pos	J#	Player	Age	NRLW		Representative	
Pos	J#	Player	Age	2021	Career	State	Tests
FB	1	Emma Tonegato	27	6	6	2	3
WG	2	Teagan Berry	19	6	7	—	—
CE	3	Jaime Chapman	20	5	8	—	—
CE	4	Page McGregor	23	6	6	—	—
WG	5	Madison Bartlett	27	5	10	—	1
FE	6	Taliah Fuimaono	22	6	6	—	1
HB	7	Rachael Pearson	28	5	5	—	—
PR	8	Elsie Albert	25	6	9	—	3
HK	9	Keeley Davis	21	6	16	1	2
PR	10	Kezie Apps	31	4	13	8	10
SR	11	Talei Holmes	22	3	6	—	1
SR	12	Shaylee Bent	21	6	12	1	—
LK	13	Holli Wheeler	32	6	13	3	2
IN	14	Quincy Dodd	21	6	11	2	—
IN	15	Kody House	31	5	6	4	—
IN	18	Renee Targett	27	5	5	—	—
IN	19	Keele Browne	19	2	2	—	—
CS	21	Aliti Namoce	24	4	7	—	—
—	16	Tegan Dymock	19	3	3	—	—
—	17	Janelle Williams	32	4	4	—	—
—	20	Shellie Long	21	0	0	—	—
—	22	Alexandra Sulusi	28	1	1	6	5
—	23	Matilda Power	24	0	0	—	—
—	24	Chantel Tugaga	20	1	1	—	—

Sydney Roosters
Pos	J#	Player	Age	Matches			
Pos	J#	Player	Age	NRLW		Representative	
Pos	J#	Player	Age	2021	Career	State	Tests
FB	1	Corban Baxter	28	4	11	7	7
WG	2	Leianne Tufuga	20	6	6	—	1
CE	3	Jessica Sergis	24	5	15	4	1
CE	4	Isabelle Kelly	25	6	15	7	7
WG	5	Brydie Parker	22	6	12	—	—
FE	6	Zahara Temara	24	6	17	4	5
HB	7	Raecene McGregor	24	6	17	—	7
PR	8	Sarah Togatuki	24	6	13	2	1
HK	9	Olivia Higgins	29	6	6	—	—
PR	10	Mya Hill-Moana	19	5	5	—	1
SR	11	Yasmin Meakes	28	6	10	2	—
SR	12	Olivia Kernick	21	6	6	—	—
LK	13	Hannah Southwell	23	6	15	4	2
IN	14	Jocelyn Kelleher	22	6	10	—	—
IN	15	Keilee Joseph	20	5	5	—	—
IN	16	Tayla Predebon	21	6	6	—	—
IN	17	Simone Karpani	24	5	5	—	—
CS	18	Joeli Morris	20	0	0	—	—
—	19	Kalosipani Hopoate	18	0	0	—	—
—	20	Shawden Burton	22	2	2	—	—
—	21	Lauretta Leao-Seve	34	0	0	—	1
—	22	Claire Reed	122	0	0	—	—
—	23	Otesa Pule	18	0	0	—	—
—	24	Taylor Mapusua	23	2	2	—	—

Notes:

- The tally of matches played in the above tables are prior to the Grand Final.
- Age is as at the date of the Grand Final, 10 April 2022.
- Going into the Grand Final, Rachael Pearson (Dragons) was second in the 2021 top point scorer list with 28 points from one try and 12 goals.
  - Madison Bartlett (Dragons) was third on the list with 20 points from five tries.
  - Zahara Temara (Roosters) was fifth on the list with 17 points from eight goals and one field goal.
  - The two goals by Temara in the Grand Final saw her into fourth place on 21 points. The try to Bartlett lifted her points tally to 28 but she remained in second place behind Lauren Brown (Broncos) who had scored 32 points from 16 goals.
- The goal-kicking conversion rates for the 2021 season prior to the match were:
  - Rachael Pearson (Dragons) 66.67% having kicked nine conversions and three penalty goals from 18 attempts.
  - Holli Wheeler (Dragons) 40.00% having kicked one conversion and one penalty goal from five attempts.
  - Dragons players Keeley Davis (4) and Alexandra Sulusi (2) missed conversion attempts during the season.
  - Zahara Temara (Roosters) 72.73% having kicked eight conversions from nine attempts.
  - Hannah Southwell (Roosters) 37.50% having kicked three conversions from eight attempts.
  - Jocelyn Kelleher (Roosters) missed one conversion attempt.
- Going into the match, the Grand Final participants placed highest in the 2021 top try scorer list were Dragons players Madison Bartlett in first place with five tries, and Teagan Berry and Emma Tonegato in equal second place with four tries.
  - Four Roosters players had score three tries: Isabelle Kelly, Olivia Kernick, Brydie Parker, and Sarah Togatuki.
  - The try by Bartlett in the Grand Final ensured her to outright first place in the 2022 top try scorers list, whilst the try by Kelly elevated her into equal second place with four tries.

== Match summary ==
The Roosters won their first premiership in their third Grand Final and fifth season.

2021 NRL Women's Premiership Grand Final

Sunday, 10 April
1:30pm AEST (UTC+10)

St. George Illawarra Dragons	4—16	Sydney Roosters
Tries: 1 Madison Bartlett (1'); Goals: nil Rachael Pearson 0/1; Sin bin: Taliah Fuimaono (19')	1st: 4–0; 2nd: 0–16	Tries: 3 Yasmin Meakes (44'); Isabelle Kelly (54'); Olivia Higgins (66'); Goals: 2 Zahara Temara 2/2 (56', 67')

Moreton Daily Stadium, Redcliffe, Brisbane
Attendance: 7,855
Referee: Belinda Sharpe
Video referee: Matt Noyen
Touch judges: Kasey Badger, Karra-Lee Nolan
Karyn Murphy Medal: Sarah Togatuki
Official NRL Website: Match Centre
Highlights: YouTube by NRL on Nine

== Post-match ==
The following 2021 Grand Finalists were selected to play in the 2022 Women's State of Origin match on 24 June 2022 or the New Zealand versus Tonga international match on 25 June 2022.

- New South Wales — Dragons: Kezie Apps, Shaylee Bent, Keeley Davis, Quincy Dodd, Rachael Pearson (debut), Emma Tonegato; Roosters: Isabelle Kelly, Olivia Kernick, Yasmin Meakes, Jessica Sergis, Hannah Southwell, Sarah Togatuki.
- Queensland — nil.
- New Zealand — Dragons: Madison Bartlett, Page McGregor (debut); Roosters: Mya Hill-Moana, Raecene McGregor.
- Tonga — Dragons: Tegan Dymock; Roosters: Kalosipani Hopoate.
