= 2024 Women's State of Origin =

Rugby league series

- Won by: Queensland
- Series margin: 2–1
- Points scored: 83
- Attendance: 74,093 (ave. 24,698 per match)
- Player of the series: Shannon Mato (Nellie Doherty Medal)
- Top points scorer(s): Rachael Pearson (14)
- Top try scorer(s): Jaime Chapman (2)

The 2024 Women's State of Origin Series was the seventh official Women's State of Origin rugby league series between New South Wales and Queensland. It was the first time in Women's State of Origin history that it was a three-game series. The first game was played at Suncorp Stadium in Brisbane on 16 May 2024. The second game on 6 June at Newcastle at McDonald Jones Stadium, and the third game decider was played at Townsville's Queensland Country Bank Stadium on 27 June 2024. The teams have played each other annually since 1999 with the 2024 series being the seventh played under the State of Origin banner. Queensland were crowned champions in the first decider in front of a packed home crowd, with Shannon Mato named Player of the Series.

== Game 1 ==
16 May 2024
19:45 AEST

Queensland	12–22	New South Wales
Tries: 2 Upton 53'; Bass 67'; Goals: 2 Temara 2/2 53', 68'	1st: 0–14; 2nd: 12–8; Match stats (NRL); Report	Tries: 3 Tonegato 5'; Chapman 9'; Johnston 64'; Goals: 5 Pearson 5/5 6', 10', pen 18', pen 37', 65'

Suncorp Stadium, Brisbane
Attendance: 25,492
Referee: Kasey Badger
Player of the Match: Yasmin Clydsdale

== Game 2 ==
6 June 2024
19:45 AEST

New South Wales	10–11	Queensland
Tries: 2 Davis 24'; Penitani 58'; Goals: 1 Pearson 1/2 25'	1st: 6–0; 2nd: 4–11; Match stats (NRL); Report	Tries: 2 Ciesiolka 54'; Aiken 61'; Goals: 1 Brown 1/2 63'; Field goals: Brown 68'

McDonald Jones Stadium, Newcastle
Attendance: 25,782
Referee: Belinda Sharpe
Player of the Match: Shannon Mato

== Game 3 ==
27 June 2024
19:45 AEST

Queensland	22–6	New South Wales
Tries: 3 Pelite 1'; Robinson 29'; Gray 67'; Goals: 5 Brown 4/4 3', pen 8', 31', 68'; Teitzel 1/1 pen 38'	1st: 14–0; 2nd: 8–6; Match stats (NRL); Report	Tries: 1 Chapman 58'; Goals: 1 Pearson 1/1 59'

Queensland Country Bank Stadium, Townsville
Attendance: 22,819
Referee: Belinda Sharpe
Player of the Match: Evania Pelite

== Teams ==
=== New South Wales Sky Blues ===
Position	Game 1	Game 2	Game 3
Fullback	CRO: Emma Tonegato		
Wing	GCT: Jaime Chapman		
Centre	SYD: Jessica Sergis		
Centre	SYD: Isabelle Kelly (c)		
Wing	CRO: Tiana Penitani		
Five-eighth	SYD: Corban Baxter		
Halfback	PAR: Rachael Pearson		
Prop	SYD: Millie Elliott		
Hooker	NEW: Olivia Higgins		
Prop	NEW: Caitlan Johnston		
Second row	WTI: Kezie Apps (c)		
Second row	NEW: Yasmin Clydsdale		
Lock	SYD: Olivia Kernick		
Interchange	SYD: Keeley Davis		GCT: Taliah Fuimaono
Interchange	GCT: Taliah Fuimaono		SYD: Keeley Davis
Interchange	CAN: Grace Kemp		
Interchange	WTI: Sarah Togatuki		
Replacement	NQL: Jakiya Whitfeld	NQL: Kirra Dibb	NQL: Jakiya Whitfeld
Reserve	NQL: Kirra Dibb	NQL: Jakiya Whitfeld	NQL: Kirra Dibb
Reserve	CRO: Ellie Johnston		
Coach	Kylie Hilder		

Note:

- Kezie Apps and Isabelle Kelly named as co-captains.
- Olivia Kernick starts at lock over Keeley Davis in game 1.
- Olivia Higgins and Grace Kemp make their debut in game 1.

=== Queensland Maroons ===
Position	Game 1	Game 2	Game 3
Fullback	NEW: Tamika Upton		
Wing	BRI: Julia Robinson		
Centre	BRI: Shenae Ciesiolka		
Centre	GCT: Evania Pelite		
Wing	GCT: Emily Bass	CQC: Emmanita Paki	
Five-eighth	SYD: Tarryn Aiken		
Halfback	CAN: Zahara Temara	BRI: Ali Brigginshaw (c)	
Prop	GCT: Shannon Mato		
Hooker	BRI: Destiny Brill	GCT: Lauren Brown	
Prop	GCT: Jessika Elliston		
Second row	BRI: Tazmin Rapana		
Second row	BRI: Romy Teitzel		
Lock	BRI: Ali Brigginshaw (c)	GCT: Sienna Lofipo	BRI: Keilee Joseph
Interchange	NQL: Emma Manzelmann	BRI: Destiny Brill	NQL: Emma Manzelmann
Interchange	CAN: Sophie Holyman	NQL: Emma Manzelmann	NQL: Makenzie Weale
Interchange	GCT: Lauren Brown	NQL: Makenzie Weale	CAN: Sophie Holyman
Interchange	NQL: Makenzie Weale	BRI: Keilee Joseph	BRI: Chelsea Lenarduzzi
Replacement	GCT: Sienna Lofipo	CAN: Zahara Temara	
Reserve	BRI: Keilee Joseph	CAN: Sophie Holyman	GCT: Emily Bass
Reserve	BRI: Skyla Adams		NQL: Lily Peacock
Coach	Tahnee Norris		

Notes:

- Keilee Joseph was ruled out of game 1 with an MCL sprain.
- Makenzie Weale makes her Origin debut in Game 1.
- Lily Peacock replaces injured Destiny Brill.

== Under-19s ==
The Under-19s match was played as a double-header with the Men's Under-19s match.

=== Match summary ===
Thursday, 20 June 2023
17:45 (AEST)

New South Wales	46–4	Queensland
Tries: 9 Kasey Reh 6'; Lindsay Tui 18'; Chelsea Savill 23'; Eveh McEwen 27'; Bronte Wilson 33'; Maria Paseka 39'; Evie McGrath 41'; Ryvrr-Lee Alo 48'; Indie Bostock 50'; Goals: 5 Chelsea Savill 24', 49', 51'; Charlotte Basham 28', 34'	NRL stats Report	Tries: 1 Ebony Raftstrand-Smith 14'

Leichhardt Oval, Sydney
Attendance: 3,182
Player of the Match: Kasey Reh

=== Teams ===
New South Wales	Position	Queensland
NEW: Lilly-Ann White	Fullback	Montaya Hudson: BRI
CRO: Tia-Jordan Vasilovski	Wing	Kiarah Siauane: SLM
Ill: Indie Bostock	Centre	Mercedez Taulelei-Siala: TWE
PAR: Lindsay Tui	Centre	Mariah Brown: WYN
Ill: Maria Paseka	Wing	Ebony Raftstrand-Smith: MAC
Ill: Evie McGrath	Five-Eighth	Caitlin Tanner: WYN
Ill: Kasey Reh	Halfback	Skyla Adams (c): BRI
CRO: Manilita Takapautolo	Prop	Matekino Gray: GCT
Ill: Chelsea Savill	Hooker	Imogen Hei: SYD
Ill: Hope Millard	Prop	Shaylee Joseph: BRI
NEW: Evah McEwen	2nd Row	Lily Peacock: MAC
Ill: Charlotte Basham	2nd Row	Reegan Hicks: BRI
PAR: Ryvrr-Lee Alo	Lock	Tiresa Leasuasu: BRI
NEW: Evie Jones	Interchange	Jaydah Tofae: SLM
Ill: Ella Koster	Interchange	Shauna Barnham: NOR
WTI: Claudia Brown	Interchange	Maleala Su'a: SLM
Ill: Bronte Wilson	Interchange	KaRelna Wuruki-Hosea: BRI
CBY: Abby Aros	Reserve	Paityne Johns: MAC
Kate Mullaly	Coach	Deanna Turner

Notes:

- Squad lists:

== See also ==
- 2024 NRL season
- 2024 NRL Women's season
- 2024 State of Origin series
