= 2021 NRL Women's season results =

The 2021 NRL Women's Premiership was the fifth season of professional women's rugby league in Australia. All games took place in 2022, not 2021, as a result of the COVID-19 pandemic.

== Regular season ==
=== Round 1 ===
Home	Score	Away	Match information				
Home	Score	Away	Date and time	Venue	Referees	Attendance	Reports
St. George Illawarra Dragons	20 – 12	Gold Coast Titans	Sunday, 27 February, 12:00 pm	McDonald Jones Stadium	Karra-Lee Nolan	2,615	
Sydney Roosters	4 – 20	Brisbane Broncos	Sunday 27 February, 1:50 pm	McDonald Jones Stadium	Belinda Sharpe	3,847	
Newcastle Knights	12 – 13	Parramatta Eels	Sunday 27 February, 3:40 pm	McDonald Jones Stadium	Kasey Badger	5,049	

=== Round 2 ===
Home	Score	Away	Match information				
Home	Score	Away	Date and time	Venue	Referees	Attendance	Reports
Newcastle Knights	10 – 28	Brisbane Broncos	Sunday, 6 March, 12:00 pm	WIN Stadium	Kasey Badger	1,036	
Sydney Roosters	16 – 26	Gold Coast Titans	Sunday, 6 March, 1:50 pm	WIN Stadium	Karra-Lee Nolan	1,278	
St. George Illawarra Dragons	10 – 0	Parramatta Eels	Sunday, 6 March, 3:40 pm	WIN Stadium	Belinda Sharpe	2,079	

=== Round 3 ===
Home	Score	Away	Match information				
Home	Score	Away	Date and time	Venue	Referees	Attendance	Reports
Sydney Roosters	28 – 12	Newcastle Knights	Saturday, 12 March, 1:00 pm	Sydney Cricket Ground	Karra-Lee Nolan		
St. George Illawarra Dragons	18 – 22	Brisbane Broncos	Sunday, 13 March, 12:00 pm	CommBank Stadium	Belinda Sharpe		
Parramatta Eels	24 – 14	Gold Coast Titans	Sunday, 13 March, 1:45 pm	CommBank Stadium	Kasey Badger		

=== Round 4 ===
Home	Score	Away	Match information				
Home	Score	Away	Date and time	Venue	Referees	Attendance	Reports
Gold Coast Titans	28 – 26	Brisbane Broncos	Saturday, 19 March, 1:00 pm	Cbus Super Stadium	Belinda Sharpe		
Parramatta Eels	18 – 19	Sydney Roosters	Sunday, 20 March, 12:00 pm	McDonald Jones Stadium	Kasey Badger		
Newcastle Knights	4 – 40	St. George Illawarra Dragons	Sunday, 20 March, 1:45 pm	McDonald Jones Stadium	Karra-Lee Nolan		

=== Round 5 ===
Home	Score	Away	Match information				
Home	Score	Away	Date and time	Venue	Referees	Attendance	Reports
St. George Illawarra Dragons	16 – 10	Sydney Roosters	Saturday, 26 March, 1:00 pm	Netstrata Jubilee Stadium	Belinda Sharpe	1,023	
Gold Coast Titans	14 – 10	Newcastle Knights	Sunday, 27 March, 12:00 pm	Suncorp Stadium	Karra-Lee Nolan		
Brisbane Broncos	38 – 4	Parramatta Eels	Sunday, 27 March, 1:45 pm	Suncorp Stadium	Kasey Badger		

== Finals Series ==
Home	Score	Away	Match information				
Home	Score	Away	Date and time	Venue	Referees	Attendance	Reports
St. George Illawarra Dragons	24 – 18	Gold Coast Titans	Sunday, 3 April 2022, 12.00pm	Leichhardt Oval	Kasey Badger	1,734	
Brisbane Broncos	16 – 22	Sydney Roosters	Sunday, 3 April 2022, 1.45pm	Leichhardt Oval	Belinda Sharpe	2,124	

== Grand Final ==
Sunday, April 10, 2022.
1.30 PM

St. George Illawarra Dragons	4 – 16	Sydney Roosters
Tries: 1 Madison Bartlett; Goals: nil	1st: 4-0; 2nd: 0-16; Reports	Tries: 3 Yasmin Meakes; Isabelle Kelly; Olivia Higgins; Goals: 2 Zahara Temara 2

Moreton Daily Stadium
Attendance: 7,855
Karyn Murphy Medal: Sarah Togatuki
Referee: Belinda Sharpe
