= Otesa Pule =

New Zealand international rugby league player

Personal information
- Born: 28 May 2003 (age 23) Middlemore, New Zealand
- Height: 169 cm (5 ft 7 in)
- Weight: 85 kg (13 st 5 lb)

Playing information
- Position: Prop, Second-row
Club
Years	Team	Pld	T	G	FG	P
2022–	Sydney Roosters	40	9	0	0	36
Representative
Years	Team	Pld	T	G	FG	P
2022–26	New Zealand	17	2	0	0	8
2026	Queensland	3	1	0	0	4
- Source: As of 15 November 2026

Otesa Pule (born 28 May 2003) is a New Zealand rugby league footballer who plays as a prop for the Sydney Roosters in the NRL Women's Premiership.

== Background ==
Pule was born in the Auckland suburb of Middlemore and grew up on the Sunshine Coast, Queensland, where she played her junior rugby league for the Caboolture Snakes.

She attended high school at Mabel Park State High School in Brisbane before being signed by the Sydney Roosters.

== Playing career ==
=== Sydney Roosters ===
Pule began the 2022 season playing for the Roosters in the under-19 Tarsha Gale Cup, where she was the competition's leading try scorer. On 23 June 2022, she represented Queensland under-19.

In Round 1 of the 2022 NRL Women's season, she made her NRLW debut for the Roosters in their 38–16 win over the Parramatta Eels.

In November 2022, she represented New Zealand at the World Cup, starting at second-row in their 24–4 loss to Australia.

On 6 October 2024, she started at prop in the Roosters 2024 NRL Women's Grand Final win over the Cronulla Sharks.

On 22 April 2026, Pule was named to make her Women's State of Origin debut for Queensland in Game I of the 2026 Women's State of Origin series, which she scored a debut try. Due to a change eligibility laws, allowing players from other Tier 1 nations to play State of Origin, Pule was deemed eligible to represent Queensland.
