= Keilee Joseph =

Australia international rugby league player

Personal information
- Full name: Keilee Alyssa Joseph
- Born: 19 January 2002 (age 24) Brisbane, Queensland, Australia
- Height: 164 cm (5 ft 5 in)
- Weight: 75 kg (11 st 11 lb)

Playing information
- Position: Lock, Prop
Club
Years	Team	Pld	T	G	FG	P
2022–23	Sydney Roosters	22	3	0	0	12
2024–25	Brisbane Broncos	23	1	0	0	4
2026–	Parramatta Eels	0	0	0	0	0
	Total	45	4	0	0	16
Representative
Years	Team	Pld	T	G	FG	P
2022–25	Indigenous All Stars	4	1	0	0	4
2022–26	Australia	13	5	0	0	20
2023–26	Queensland	9	0	0	0	0
- Source: As of 16 November 2026

Keilee Alyssa Joseph (born 19 January 2002) is an Australian professional rugby league footballer who plays as a lock for the Parramatta Eels in the NRL Women's Premiership (NRLW). She previously played for the Sydney Roosters, winning the 2021 NRLW premiership and Brisbane Broncos winning the 2025 NRLW premiership. Representatively, she has played for Australia, Queensland and the Indigenous All Stars.

== Background ==
Joseph was born in Brisbane, Queensland. She has Indigenous Australian heritage. She attended Marsden State High School, before earning a rugby league scholarship to Mabel Park State High School.

Joseph played junior club rugby league for the Waterford Demons in Meadowbrook, where she was coached by her father Shane Joseph. She later captained the Queensland under-19 side.

== Playing career ==
=== 2021 season ===
On 27 February 2022, in the first round of the delayed 2021 NRL Women's season, Joseph made her debut off the interchange bench for the Sydney Roosters against the Brisbane Broncos. In round three, she scored her first try for the club in a 28–12 win against the Newcastle Knights. On 10 April 2022, she played in the Sydney Roosters' grand final victory against the St George Illawarra Dragons to secure the club's first NRLW premiership. Overall, during the 2021 season, Joseph scored two tries from six appearances, all coming from the interchange bench.

=== 2022 season ===
Joseph appeared in all five rounds for the Sydney Roosters during 2022 season, winning the club's first NRLW minor premiership on 18 September. Joseph was named in the "Dream Team" announced by the Rugby League Players Association. The team was selected by the players, who each cast one vote for each position.

In November, at the delayed 2021 Women's Rugby League World Cup, Joseph made her debut for Australia, playing two games during the tournament as her country secured the World Cup.

== Achievements and accolades ==
=== Representative ===
- Rugby League World Cup Champion: 2026
