= Rugby League Players Association =

Australian representative organisation

RLPA
- Rugby League Players Association
- Founded: 1979
- Headquarters: Surry Hills, New South Wales
- Location: Australia
- Members: 600+
- Key people: Felise Kaufusi, General President; Clint Newton, CEO
- Website: www.rlpa.com.au

The Rugby League Players Association is a representative organisation based in Australia. The RLPA, as it is more commonly referred to, is the representative body of elite rugby league players, protecting and promoting the welfare and interests of its members.

Formerly the Rugby League Professionals Association, the company changed its name in 2009.

== Structure ==
The RLPA is not a registered union; individual NRL and NRLW players do not pay fees to be part of the association and instead the RLPA's funding is paid for from the players' total share of revenue.

=== Leadership ===
Former Newcastle Knights captain Tony Butterfield was appointed RLPA CEO in 2000.

Former Western Reds and Penrith Panthers player Matthew Rodwell was CEO for a brief period up until 2009.

In 2009, David Garnsey took the reins as chief executive officer through until 2015.

In December 2015, former Carlton Football Club player and AFLPA general manager of Player Relations Ian Prendergast was appointed chief executive officer of the RLPA.

In 2017, Australian, Queensland and Melbourne Storm captain Cameron Smith was appointed General President of the RLPA, taking over from Clint Newton who continued with the organisation in the role of general manager of Player Relations.

In 2020, Prendergast departed the RLPA and Newton was appointed chief executive officer.

=== RLPA board of directors ===
The current RLPA board of Directors consists of players and industry professionals. The most recent additions were Josh Hodgson, Chelsea Lenarduzzi, Stuart Nelson, and Joanne Taylor during 2022.

- Deidre Anderson (chair)
- Daly Cherry-Evans (General President)
- Clint Newton (CEO and managing director)
- Chelsea Lenarduzzi
- Tim Gordon
- Chad Townsend
- Josh Hodgson
- Hannah Southwell
- Madison Bartlett
- Felise Kaufusi
- Dale Finucane
- Steven Harker AM

== The Players' Champion ==
The Rugby League Players' Association's annual awards ceremony, The Players' Champion, recognises the best player in the National Rugby League as voted by their peers.

Four-time winner of the award Johnathan Thurston, described the Players' Champion as "the highest accolade a player can get."

In 2019, the first Players' Champion accolade was awarded to an NRLW player, with Jessica Sergis taking out the inaugural honour.

=== Previous winners ===
| Season | Player's Champion (NRL) | Club |
|---|---|---|
| 2004 | Danny Buderus | Newcastle Knights |
| 2005 | Johnathan Thurston | North Queensland Cowboys |
| 2006 | Ben Kennedy | Manly Warringah Sea Eagles |
| 2007 | Matt Bowen | North Queensland Cowboys |
| 2008 | Braith Anasta | Sydney Roosters |
| 2008 | Petero Civoniceva | Penrith Panthers |
| 2009 | Jarryd Hayne | Parramatta Eels |
| 2010 | Darius Boyd | St. George Illawarra Dragons |
| 2011 | Akuila Uate | Newcastle Knights |
| 2012 | Ben Barba | Canterbury-Bankstown Bulldogs |
| 2013 | Johnathan Thurston (2) | North Queensland Cowboys |
| 2014 | Johnathan Thurston (3) | North Queensland Cowboys |
| 2015 | Johnathan Thurston (4) | North Queensland Cowboys |
| 2016 | Jason Taumalolo | North Queensland Cowboys |
| 2017 | James Tedesco | Sydney Roosters |
| 2018 | Kalyn Ponga | Newcastle Knights |
| 2019 | James Tedesco (2) | Sydney Roosters |
| 2020 | Nathan Cleary | Penrith Panthers |
| 2021 | Tom Trbojevic | Manly Warringah Sea Eagles |
| 2022 | James Tedesco (3) | Sydney Roosters |
| 2023 | Shaun Johnson | New Zealand Warriors |
| 2024 | Jahrome Hughes | Melbourne Storm |
| 2025 | James Tedesco (4) | Sydney Roosters |

| Season | Player's Champion (NRLW) | Club |
|---|---|---|
| 2019 | Jessica Sergis | St. George Illawarra Dragons |
| 2020 | Hannah Southwell | Sydney Roosters |
| 2021 | Emma Tonegato | St. George Illawarra Dragons |
| 2022 | Raecene McGregor | Sydney Roosters |
| 2023 | Teagan Berry | St. George Illawarra Dragons |
| 2024 | Isabelle Kelly | Sydney Roosters |
| 2025 | Tamika Upton | Brisbane Broncos |

== Collective Bargaining Agreement ==
In November 2017, the RLPA negotiated a new Collective Bargaining Agreement with the National Rugby League that secured the biggest pay increase for players in the game's 109-year history.

The new CBA deal captures a range of employment related clauses for a five-year period, beginning in 2018 through until 2022.

In a show of unity and solidarity behind the RLPA in the ongoing negotiations, NRL players wore branded caps throughout State of Origin press conferences and green tape in Round 21 of the 2017 season. RLPA CEO Ian Prendergast stated it "was no secret players had become increasingly frustrated" by negotiations. "They want to stand up, use their voice and demonstrate their solidarity across the weekend to get this deal over the line so we can deliver certainty in the industry."

The concluding months of the CBA, and the passage of its deadline in November 2022, saw increasing tensions between the NRL and the RLPA. Although the NRL and RLPA had agreed to an increase in player payments of 37%, with $1.35bn to be designated to players between 2023 and 2027, the two parties were at odds regarding a number of issues regarding working conditions and control of funds, including access to and ownership of personal and medical player data, allocation of funds to the RLPA’s programs, the length of the season, minimum wages, insurance for death and total disability, the ability of players to negotiate with other clubs, payments for international matches, and autonomy over union funding.

As part of the standoff, RLPA members covered up the NRL logo on their jerseys during Round 22's matches, refused to speak to the media on game days, released a video titled Stand With Us aimed at garnering support from fans, sent letters to the club chairs and main sponsors of the clubs and the league to complain about the lack of progress in negotiations and asking for support, as well as threatening to delay match kickoff times and boycott the Dally M Awards ceremony.

The standoff ended on 10 August 2023 after the NRL and Rugby League Players Association settled on an in-principle collective bargaining agreement (CBA), with the league’s first billion-dollar CBA, which lasts until 2027 and covers men’s and women’s players, expected to be finalised over the coming days, pending documentation and ratification.
