= Rima Butler =

Australia international rugby league player (born 1997)

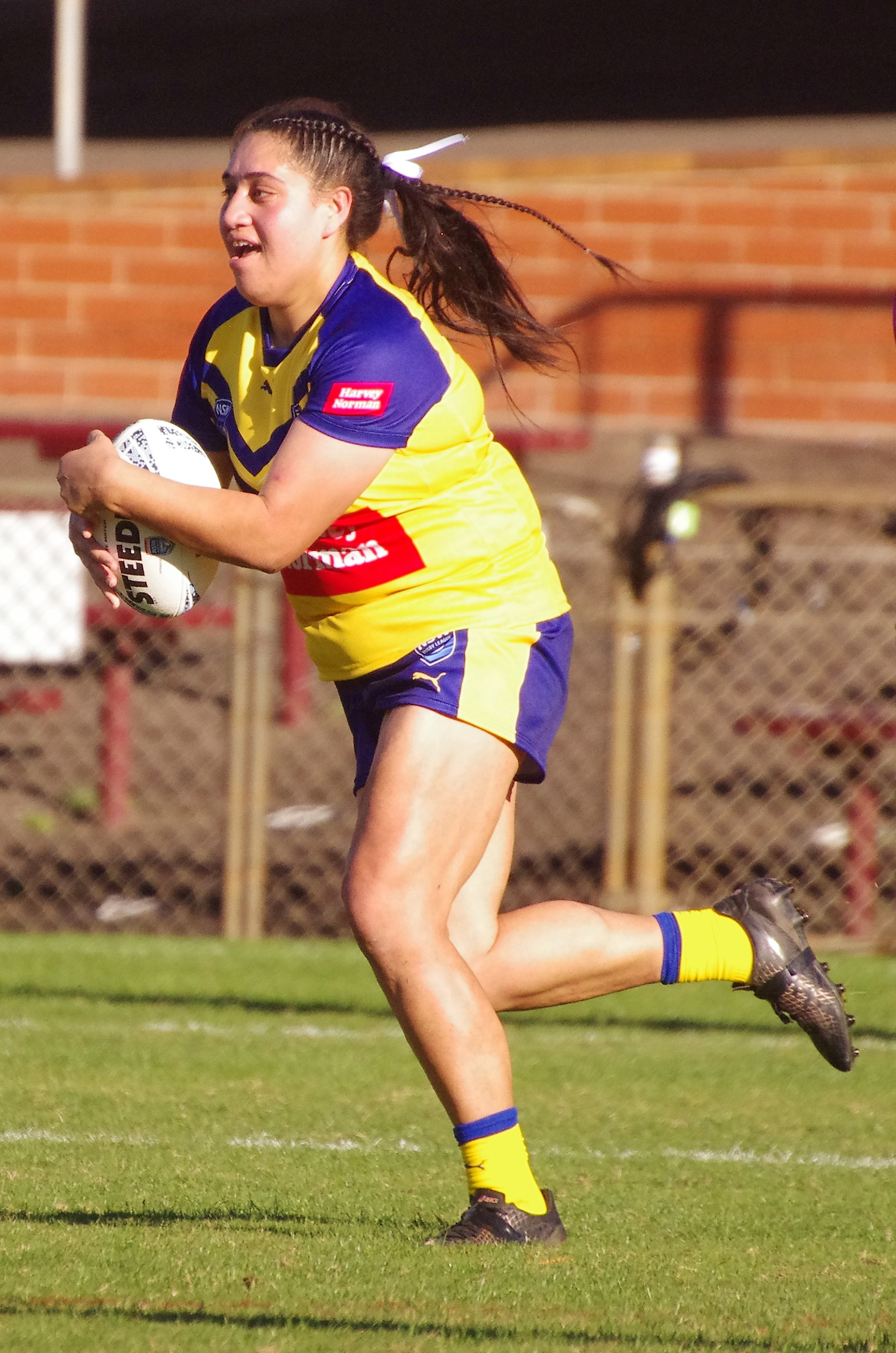

Personal information
- Born: 20 December 1997 (age 28) Minto, New South Wales, Australia
- Height: 178 cm (5 ft 10 in)
- Weight: 105 kg (16 st 7 lb)

Playing information
- Position: Prop
Club
Years	Team	Pld	T	G	FG	P
2022	Parramatta Eels	5	1	0	0	4
2023–24	Newcastle Knights	15	2	0	0	8
2025–26	Sydney Roosters	25	6	0	0	24
2027–	Wests Tigers	0	0	0	0	0
	Total	45	9	0	0	36
Representative
Years	Team	Pld	T	G	FG	P
2024–25	NZ Māori	2	0	0	0	0
2025	Australia	3	0	0	0	0
2026	New South Wales	2	0	0	0	0
- Source: As of 1 November 2026
- Relatives: Harata Butler (cousin); Teina Clark (cousin)

Rima Butler (born 20 December 1997) is an Australian professional rugby league footballer who currently plays for the Wests Tigers in the NRL Women's Premiership. Her position is prop. She previously played for the Parramatta Eels, Newcastle Knights and Sydney Roosters.

== Background ==
Born in Minto, New South Wales, Butler played her junior rugby league for the Minto Cobras.

== Playing career ==
=== 2022 ===
In round 1 of the 2022 NRLW season, Butler made her NRLW debut for the Parramatta Eels against the Sydney Roosters.

=== 2023 ===
In May, Butler signed a 2-year contract with the Newcastle Knights. In round 1 of the 2023 NRLW season, she made her Knights debut against the St. George Illawarra Dragons.

Butler played off the bench in the Knights' 24-18 Grand Final win over the Gold Coast Titans.

=== 2024 ===
After 15 games with the Knights, Butler parted ways with the club at the end of the season. In October, she signed a 2-year contract with the Sydney Roosters starting in 2025.

In February she was called up for the NZ Māori

=== 2026 ===
She made her New South Wales debut on 14 May 2026 coming off the bench in the 14–10 win over Queensland at the Suncorp, Brisbane.
