= Jayme Fressard =

Australian rugby league footballer (born 1997)

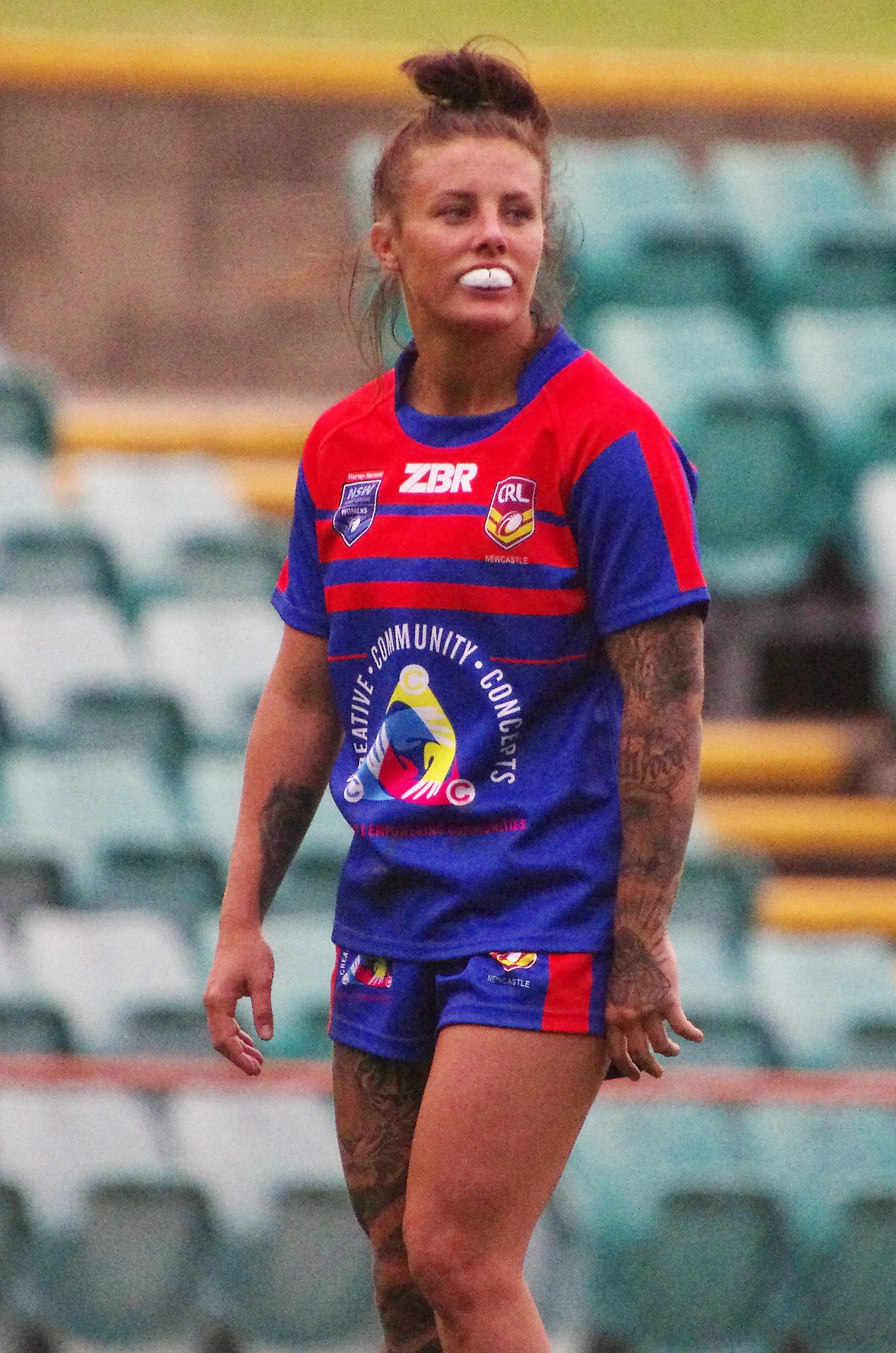
- Fressard in 2018

Personal information
- Born: 27 June 1997 (age 29) Gosford, New South Wales, Australia
- Height: 158 cm (5 ft 2 in)
- Weight: 63 kg (9 st 13 lb)

Playing information
- Position: Wing, Centre
Club
Years	Team	Pld	T	G	FG	P
2020	Brisbane Broncos	3	0	0	0	0
2021	Newcastle Knights	4	1	0	0	4
2022–	Sydney Roosters	40	35	0	0	140
	Total	47	36	0	0	144
Representative
Years	Team	Pld	T	G	FG	P
2025–26	New South Wales	6	5	0	0	20
- Source: RLP As of 16 November 2026

Jayme Fressard (born 27 June 1997) is an Australian rugby league footballer who plays as a centre, wing for the Sydney Roosters in the NRL Women's Premiership. She previously played for the Brisbane Broncos and Newcastle Knights in the NRL Women's Premiership, and the Central Coast Roosters in the NSWRL Women's Premiership.

== Background ==
Fressard was born in Gosford and attended Wyong high school where she played rugby sevens. In 2015, she represented Australia in rugby sevens at the 2015 Commonwealth Youth Games in Apia.

== Playing career ==
In 2016, Fressard played for the Berkeley Vale Panthers and was named 18th player for New South Wales. In 2017, she was again named in the New South Wales squad but did not play.

In 2018, Fressard joined CRL Newcastle in the NSWRL Women's Premiership. In June 2018, she represented NSW Country at the Women's National Championships. On 21 June 2018, she joined the Brisbane Broncos NRL Women's Premiership team. In July 2018, she ruptured her ACL and MCL, ruling her out for the 2018 NRL Women's season.

In 2019, she broke her ankle, which saw her miss the 2019 NRL Women's season.

=== 2020 ===
In 2020, Fressard joined the Central Coast Roosters in the NSWRL Women's Premiership.

On 23 September, Fressard re-signed with the Broncos' NRLW team. In Round 1 of the 2020 NRL Women's season, she made her debut for the Broncos in a 28–14 win over the New Zealand Warriors. On 25 October, she started at centre in the Broncos 20–10 NRLW Grand Final win over the Sydney Roosters.

=== 2021 ===
On 25 November, Fressard signed with the Newcastle Knights to be a part of their inaugural NRLW squad.

=== 2022 ===
In round 1 of the delayed 2021 NRL Women's season, Fressard made her club debut for the Knights against the Parramatta Eels.

In June, she signed with the Sydney Roosters for the 2022 season.

== Achievements and accolades ==
=== Team ===
- 2020 NRLW Grand Final: Brisbane Broncos – Winners
