= Jasmin Strange =

England international rugby league player

Personal information
- Born: 21 December 2002 (age 23) Gosford, New South Wales, Australia
- Height: 177 cm (5 ft 10 in)
- Weight: 76 kg (12 st 0 lb)

Playing information
- Position: Wing, Centre, Second-row
Club
Years	Team	Pld	T	G	FG	P
2022	Sydney Roosters	1	1	0	0	4
2023	Newcastle Knights	11	4	0	0	16
2024–	Sydney Roosters	36	6	0	0	24
	Total	48	11	0	0	44
Representative
Years	Team	Pld	T	G	FG	P
2023–24	Māori All Stars	2	2	0	0	8
2026	England	1	0	0	0	0
- Source: As of 17 October 2026
- Father: John Strange
- Relatives: Ethan Strange (brother)

Jasmin Strange (born 21 December 2002) is an Australian professional rugby league footballer who currently plays for the Sydney Roosters in the NRL Women's Premiership. Her positions are second-row, wing and centre. She previously played for the Newcastle Knights.

== Background ==
Strange was born in Gosford, New South Wales. She is the daughter of Sydney Roosters NRLW coach John Strange. She is also brother Canberra Raiders star, Ethan Strange.

== Playing career ==
=== 2022 ===
In round 4 of the 2022 NRLW season, Strange made her NRLW debut for the Sydney Roosters against the Newcastle Knights, playing under her father John who was coach of the Roosters.

=== 2023 ===
In February, Strange played for the Māori All Stars against the Indigenous All Stars, scoring a try in the Maori's 16–12 win. She then joined the Newcastle Knights' NSWRL Women's Premiership team. In May, she signed an NRLW contract with the Knights for the 2023 season. In round 1 of the 2023 NRLW season, she made her Knights debut against the St. George Illawarra Dragons, scoring a try in the Knights' 32–16 win. Strange became a mainstay on the wing for the Knights and played every game in the 2023 season including the 24–18 Grand Final victory over the Gold Coast Titans.

On 15 December 2023, Strange signed a two-year deal to return to the Sydney Roosters and play under her father and coach John Strange.

=== 2026 ===
She made her England international début in the 2026 Rugby League World Cup 70-6 win over Wales on 17 October 2026.
