= Olivia Kernick =

Australia international rugby league footballer (born 2001)

Personal information
- Born: 10 January 2001 (age 25) Sydney, New South Wales, Australia
- Height: 181 cm (5 ft 11 in)
- Weight: 83 kg (13 st 1 lb)

Playing information
- Position: Lock
Club
Years	Team	Pld	T	G	FG	P
2022–	Sydney Roosters	46	20	0	0	80
Representative
Years	Team	Pld	T	G	FG	P
2021	Indigenous All Stars	2	0	0	0	0
2022–26	Australia	14	7	0	0	28
2022–26	New South Wales	12	2	0	0	8
2022–23	Māori All Stars	2	0	0	0	0
- Source: RLP As of 16 November 2026

Olivia Kernick (born 10 January 2001) is an Australian rugby league footballer who plays as a lock for the Sydney Roosters in the NRL Women's Premiership and the Tweed Heads Seagulls in the QRL Women's Premiership.

She has represented New South Wales and Australia.

== Playing career ==
=== 2021 ===
On 20 February 2021, Kernick represented the Indigenous All Stars in their 24–0 loss to the Māori All Stars.

=== 2022 ===
In Round 1 of the delayed 2021 NRL Women's season, Kernick made her NRLW for the Sydney Roosters against the Brisbane Broncos. She also played in the Roosters' 2021 Grand Final win over the St. George Illawarra Dragons. Additionally, she was named the team's Rookie of the Year.

In September, Kernick was named in the Dream Team announced by the Rugby League Players Association. The team was selected by the players, who each cast one vote for each position.

Kernick was selected for The Jillaroos in the 2021 Women's Rugby League World Cup and in the 2021 Women's Rugby League World Cup final, her team won 54-4 against New Zealand.

=== 2024 ===
On 2 October, Kernick took out the Women's Dally M medal winning by two votes.

=== 2025 ===
On May 29, Kernick was named the Nellie Doherty Medallist as player of the Women's State of Origin Series playing a starring role in the 2-1 series victory for the Blues.

== Achievements and accolades ==
=== Individual ===
- Sydney Roosters Rookie of the Year: 2021
- Women's Dally M Medal: 2024
- Nellie Doherty Medal: 2025

=== Team ===
- 2021 Women's Rugby League World Cup: Australia – Winners
- 2021 NRLW Grand Final: Sydney Roosters – Winners
- 2024 NRLW Grand Final: Sydney Roosters – Winners
- 2026 NRLW Grand Final: Sydney Roosters – Winners

=== Representative ===
- Rugby League World Cup Champion: 2026
