= Jocelyn Kelleher =

Australia international rugby league footballer

Personal information
- Born: 17 February 2000 (age 26) Gosford, New South Wales, Australia
- Height: 172 cm (5 ft 8 in)
- Weight: 72 kg (11 st 5 lb)

Playing information
- Position: Halfback, Five-eighth, Hooker
Club
Years	Team	Pld	T	G	FG	P
2020–	Sydney Roosters	50	7	116	1	261
Representative
Years	Team	Pld	T	G	FG	P
2025–26	New South Wales	6	1	0	0	4
2026–	Australia	3	2	18	0	44
- Source: RLP As of 16 November 2026

Jocelyn Kelleher (born 17 February 2000) is an Australian rugby league footballer who plays as a half and five-eighth for the Sydney Roosters in the NRL Women's Premiership and the Central Coast Roosters in the NSWRL Women's Premiership.

== Background ==
Born in Gosford, New South Wales, Kelleher played her junior rugby league for the Central Coast Roosters.

== Playing career ==
In March 2020, Kelleher joined the Central Coast Roosters in the NSWRL Women's Premiership. On 27 September 2020, she started at second-row in their Grand Final win over the North Sydney Bears.

On 23 September 2020, she joined the Sydney Roosters NRL Women's Premiership team. In Round 1 of the 2020 NRL Women's season, she made her debut for the Roosters in an 18–4 win over the St George Illawarra Dragons. On 25 October 2020, she came off the bench in the Roosters Grand Final loss to the Brisbane Broncos.

In the 2024 NRL Women's season, she played a variety of positions, and won the Grand Final at Five-eighth.

== Representative ==
In 2025, Kelleher made her Origin debut for NSW playing as the utility off the bench in all three games as the NSW Blues won the series 2-1.

She made her Australia début in the 2026 Rugby League World Cup 40-0 win over Samoa on 16 October 2026, scoring 6 goals.

== Achievements and accolades ==
=== Representative ===
- Rugby League World Cup Champion: 2026
