= Brydie Parker =

Australian rugby league footballer

Personal information
- Born: 25 October 1999 (age 27) Muswellbrook, New South Wales, Australia
- Height: 172 cm (5 ft 8 in)
- Weight: 70 kg (11 st 0 lb)

Playing information
- Position: Wing, Centre, Fullback
Club
Years	Team	Pld	T	G	FG	P
2018–25	Sydney Roosters	40	13	0	0	52
Representative
Years	Team	Pld	T	G	FG	P
2019	Prime Minister's XIII	1	0	0	0	0
- Source: RLP As of 10 November 2026

Brydie Parker (born 25 October 1999) is an Australian rugby league footballer who plays for the Sydney Roosters in the NRL Women's Premiership and the Central Coast Roosters in the NSWRL Women's Premiership.

Primarily a winger or centre, she is a Prime Minister's XIII representative.

== Background ==
Parker was born in Muswellbrook, New South Wales and played her junior rugby league for the Muswellbrook Rams.

== Playing career ==
On 27 July 2018, Parker earned a contract with the Sydney Roosters NRL Women's Premiership team after being spotted at the NRL's Talent ID day held on the Gold Coast, Queensland.

In Round 3 of the 2018 NRL Women's season, she made her debut as an 18-year old for the Roosters, starting on the wing and scoring a try in a 26–0 win over the St George Illawarra Dragons. On 30 September 2018, she started on the wing in the Roosters' 12–34 Grand Final loss to the Brisbane Broncos.

In 2019, she joined the Mounties NSWRL Women's Premiership team. Parker was in the Roosters' NRLW squad for 2019 but did not play a game.

In 2020, Parker joined the Central Coast Roosters, winning a NSWRL Women's Premiership Grand Final with the team. On 25 October 2020, she started on the wing for the Roosters in their NRLW Grand Final loss to the Brisbane Broncos.
