= Sydney Roosters Women =

Rugby league club in Sydney, New South Wales, Australia

Sydney Roosters
Club information
- Full name: Eastern Suburbs District; Rugby League Football Club
- Nickname(s): Roosters, Easts, Tricolours, Chooks, Sydney City
- Short name: Sydney Roosters
- Colours: Red; White; Blue (Navy)
- Founded: Team: 8 September 2018; 8 years ago Club: 24 January 1908; 118 years ago as Eastern Suburbs District Rugby League Football Club
- Website: roosters.com.au

Current details
- Ground: Sydney Football Stadium (45,000)
- CEO: Joe Kelly
- Chairman: Nick Politis
- Coach: John Strange
- Captain: Isabelle Kelly
- Competition: NRL Women's Premiership
- 2026 season: Premiers
- Current season

Uniforms
Home colours	Away colours

Records
- Premierships: 3 (2021, 2024, 2026)
- Runners-up: 3 (2018, 2020, 2025)
- Minor premierships: 3 (2022, 2025, 2026)
- Biggest win: Roosters 66 – 8 Warriors; Allianz Stadium (23 Aug 2026)
- Biggest loss: Roosters 12 – 34 Broncos; ANZ Stadium (30 Sep 2018)
- First game: Roosters 4 – 10 Warriors; ANZ Stadium (8 Sep 2018)
- Wooden spoons: 1 (2019)
- Most capped: Isabelle Kelly – 66
- Highest try scorer: 40 – Jessica Sergis
- Highest points scorer: Jocelyn Kelleher – 371

Sydney Roosters Women are a rugby league team, representing the Eastern Suburbs region of Sydney. The team is part of the Sydney Roosters club and plays in the National Rugby League Women's Premiership.

== Seasons ==
Season	Regular season								Finals		Nines	Ref
Season	P	W	D	L	F	A	Pts	Pos	Top	Placing	Nines	Ref
2018	3	1	0	2	34	24	2	2nd	2	Runners up	—	
2019	3	0	0	3	28	60	0	4th	2	—	—	
2020	3	2	0	1	56	40	4	2nd	2	Runners up	3rd	
2021	5	2	0	3	77	92	4	4th	4	Premiers	—	
2022	5	5	0	0	156	58	10	1st	4	Semi-finalist	—	
2023	9	7	0	2	284	120	14	2nd	4	Semi-finalist	—	
2024	9	7	0	2	222	112	14	2nd	4	Premiers	—	
2025	11	11	0	0	366	126	22	1st	6	Runners up	—	
2026	11	11	0	0	434	116	22	1st	6	Premiers	—	

=== 2026 draw ===
The draw for the 2026 season was announced on 14 November 2025.

Round	Opponent	Score	Date	Time	Venue	
1	Titans	34–10	Sat 4 Jul 2026	12:45 PM	Away	Cbus Super Stadium
2	Knights	12–10	Sat 11 Jul 2026	5:15 PM	Home	Allianz Stadium
3	Raiders	22–18	Sat 18 Jul 2026	12:45 PM	Away	GIO Stadium
4	Tigers	48–10	Sun 26 Jul 2026	6:15 PM	Away	Leichhardt Oval
5	Dragons	38–8	Sat 1 Aug 2026	2:15 PM	Neutral	Geohex Stadium, Wagga Wagga
6	Eels	46–6	Sun 9 Aug 2026	6:15 PM	Home	Polytec Stadium
7	Broncos	34–20	Sat 15 Aug 2026	5:15 PM	Away	Suncorp Stadium
8	Warriors	66–8	Sun 23 Aug 2026	1:45 PM	Home	Allianz Stadium
9	Sharks	36–8	Sat 29 Aug 2026	3:15 PM	Home	Allianz Stadium
10	Cowboys	56–6	Sat 5 Sep 2026	3:15 PM	Away	Queensland Country Bank Stadium
11	Bulldogs	42–12	Thu 10 Sep 2026	7:45 PM	Home	Allianz Stadium
FW2	Raiders	20–10	Sat 26 Sep 2026	7:50 PM	Home	Allianz Stadium
GF	Broncos	30–6	Sun 4 Oct 2026	4:00 PM	Neutral	Accor Stadium

== Head-to-head records ==
Opponent	First meeting	P	W	D	L	PF	PA	Win %	Share %
Warriors	8 Sep 2018	5	3	0	2	134	52	60.00%	72.04%
Broncos	14 Sep 2018	14	7	0	7	272	260	50.00%	51.13%
Dragons	22 Sep 2018	10	8	0	2	240	80	80.00%	75.00%
Titans	6 Mar 2022	7	4	0	3	148	102	57.14%	59.20%
Knights	12 Mar 2022	7	5	0	2	127	100	71.43%	55.95%
Eels	20 Mar 2022	7	6	0	1	247	106	85.71%	69.97%
Raiders	29 Jul 2023	5	4	0	1	116	86	80.00%	57.43%
Sharks	13 Aug 2023	6	6	0	0	201	74	100.00%	73.09%
Tigers	26 Aug 2023	4	4	0	0	150	28	100.00%	84.27%
Cowboys	16 Sep 2023	4	4	0	0	150	34	100.00%	81.52%
Bulldogs	26 Jul 2025	2	2	0	0	84	34	100.00%	71.19%
Totals	8 Sep 2018	71	53	0	18	1869	956	74.65%	66.16%

Notes

- Share % is the percentage of points For over the sum of points For and Against.
- Clubs listed in the order than the Roosters Women first played them.
- Last updated: 9 October 2026

== Coaches ==
The Roosters NRLW team were helmed by a different coach in each of their first three seasons. The current coach has served for six seasons, in which time the team has won three premierships.

As of 9 October 2026

Coach	Season span	M	W	D	L	For	Agst	Win %	Share %	Ref
Adam Hartigan	2018	2	2	0	2	46	58	50.00%	44.23%	
Rick Stone	2019	3	0	0	0	28	60	0.00%	31.82%	
Jamie Feeney	2020	4	2	0	2	66	60	50.00%	52.38%	
John Strange	2021—present	60	50	0	10	1,729	778	83.33%	68.97%	

== Captains ==
All players who have captained the Sydney Roosters in the NRLW.

As of 9 October 2026

C#	Name	Years as Captain	Debut		Games as Captain			Games for Club	Ref
C#	Name	Years as Captain	Date	Round	Solo	Joint	Total	Games for Club	Ref
1	Simaima Taufa	2018–2019	8 Sep 2018	1	4	2	6	9	
2	Ruan Sims	2018	14 Sep 2018	2	0	3	3	6	
3	Isabelle Kelly	2019, 2022–present	29 Sep 2019	3	52	1	53	66	
3	Corban Baxter	2020–2021	3 Oct 2020	1	9	0	9	44	
4	Hannah Southwell	2021	27 Feb 2022	1	2	0	2	13	
5	Olivia Kernick	2025	5 Sep 2025	10	1	0	1	60	

== Current squad ==
The Sydney Roosters are coached by John Strange.

Jersey numbers in the table reflect the team list announced for the Grand Final.
Table last updated on 5 October 2026.

J#	Player	Age	Position(s)	NRLW seasons				NRLW stats					Origin	Tests	All Stars
J#	Player	Age	Position(s)	Debut	2018-24	2025	2026	M	T	G	Pts	Prems	Origin	Tests	All Stars
1	Corban Baxter	32	Fullback, Five-eighth	2019	22	9	13	44	13	0	52	2	10	7	1 4
2	Brydie Parker	26	Wing, Fullback	2018	28	13	13	54	28	0	112	3	—	—	—
3	Jessica Sergis	29	Centre	2018	10 23	13	13	59	45	0	180	3	16	14	—
4	Isabelle Kelly	30	Centre	2018	7 2 34	12	13	68	30	0	120	3	19	20	1
5	Jayme Fressard	29	Wing, Centre	2020	3 4 22	8	10	47	36	0	144	1 2	6	—	—
6	Jocelyn Kelleher	26	Five-eighth, Halfback	2020	38	13	13	64	8	169	371	3	6	—	—
7	Tarryn Aiken	27	Halfback, Five-eighth	2019	19 19	7	11	56	24	7	111	2 2	11	10	—
8	Millie Elliott	28	Prop	2019	13 7 18	P	13	51	10	0	40	2 1 2	12	4	—
9	Keeley Nizza	26	Hooker	2018	23 20	13	13	69	12	0	48	2	13	9	—
10	Otesa Pule	23	Prop, Second-row	2022	27	13	13	53	11	0	44	2	3	13	—
11	Sariah Paki	24	Second-row, Centre	2026	—	U7s	13	13	6	0	24	1	—	—	—
12	Jasmin Strange	23	Second-row, Centre	2022	1 11 11	13	13	49	11	0	44	1 2	—	—	4
13	Olivia Kernick	25	Lock, Second-row	2021	34	13	13	60	24	0	96	3	12	10	3 2
14	Taina Naividi	25	Wing, Hooker	2021	5 6	11	9	31	16	0	64	2	—	2	—
15	Aliyah Nasio	20	Second-row, Lock	2024	4	12	10	26	4	0	16	2	—	—	—
16	Rima Butler	28	Prop	2022	5 15	13	12	45	9	0	36	1 1	2	3	3
17	Amber Hall	31	Second-row, Prop	2019	18 11	11	9	49	16	0	64	2 2	—	14	—
18	Mia Wood	27	Wing, Second-row	2023	14	13	4	31	16	0	64	2	—	—	—
19	Taneisha Gray	21	Second-row	2025	—	2	2	4	1	0	4	1	—	—	1
20	Nikiah Campbell	25	Second-row	—	—	R	—	0	0	0	0	—	—	—	—
21	Shawden Burton	26	Hooker	2021	13	7	5	25	0	0	0	2	—	—	—
22	Keighley Simpson	21	Centre, Wing	2025	—	3	1	4	4	0	16	1	—	—	—
–	Tatum Bird	26	Halfback	—	—	RU	—	0	0	0	0	—	—	—	—
–	Eliza Lopamaua	21	Second-row, Prop	2024	4	11	—	15	2	0	8	1	—	2	—
–	Talea Tonga	18	Halfback	—	—	R	—	0	0	0	0	—	—	—	—
IS	Macie Carlile	25	Prop, Second-row	2023	3	12	3	18	2	0	8	1	—	—	—
DV	Logan Fletcher	19	Wing	2025	—	1	—	1	1	0	4	—	—	—	—
DV	Te Raukura Leafe	19	Prop, Second-row	—	—	U	—	0	0	0	0	—	—	—	—
DV	Anastasia Leatupue	18	Prop	—	—	—	—	0	0	0	0	—	—	—	—
DV	Mia Vaotu'au	18	Fullback	—	—	—	—	0	0	0	0	—	—	—	—
Z	Mahlie Cashin	19	Hooker	—	—	R	—	0	0	0	0	—	—	—	—

Notes:

- Nikiah Campbell and Keighley Simpson were signed on a supplementary contract for 2026
- The following players were signed on a development contract for 2026.
  - Mahlie Cashin
  - Te Raukura Leafe
  - Talea Tonga
  - Mia Vaotuua (who played for the Central Coast Roosters, Tarsha Gale side in 2026)
- The following players were signed on a development contract for 2025.
  - Mahlie Cashin (who played for the Sydney Roosters Indigenous Academy, Tarsha Gale Cup side in 2025)
  - Sienna Thomas
  - Talea Tonga (who played for the Central Coast Roosters, Lisa Fiaola side in 2025)
- Millie Elliott missed the 2025 season due to pregnancy.

The Sydney Roosters announced contract extensions in several instalments from August 2025.

=== Players extended ===
- Otesa Pule (2028)
- Keeley Nizza (2027)
- Jasmin Strange (2028)

=== Players out ===
- Rima Butler to Wests Tigers

Retirement

- Corban Baxter
- Millie Elliott

Off contract

- Tatum Bird
- Taneisha Gray
- Amber Hall
- Isabelle Kelly
- Sariah Paki
- Keighley Simpson (Sup)
- Talea Tonga
- Mia Wood

==== Off contract after 2027 ====
- Tarryn Aiken
- Shawden Burton
- Macie Carlile
- Jayme Fressard
- Jocelyn Kelleher
- Olivia Kernick
- Eliza Lopamaua
- Taina Naividi
- Aliyah Nasio
- Keeley Nizza
- Brydie Parker
- Jessica Sergis

== Club records ==
Win-loss record since entering the NRLW in 2018

Games	Wins	Drawn	Loss	Points for	Points against	+/-	Win %
71	53	0	18	1,869	956	+913	74.65%

=== Player records ===
Lists and tables last updated: 9 October 2026.

==== Career records (at the Roosters) ====
===== Most games for the Roosters =====
Qualification: 20 games

Rank	Player	Span	Games
1	Isabelle Kelly	2018–19, 2021–	66
2	Jocelyn Kelleher	2020–	64
3	Olivia Kernick	2021–	60
4	Brydie Parker	2018, 2020–21, 2023–	54
5	Otesa Pule	2022–	53
6	Jessica Sergis	2021–	49
7	Corban Baxter	2019–21, 2023–	44
8	Jayme Fressard	2022–	40
9	Jasmin Strange	2022–	38
10	Tarryn Aiken	2023–	37
11	Mia Wood	2023–	31
11	Amber Hall	2023–	31
11	Millie Elliott	2023–24, 2026–	31
14	Taina Naividi	2024–	26
14	Aliyah Nasio	2024–	26
16	Mya Hill-Moana	2021–24	25
16	Shawden Burton	2021–	25
16	Rima Butler	2025–	25
19	Zahara Temara	2018–22	24
19	Kalosipani Hopoate	2022–24	24
21	Keilee Joseph	2021–23	22

===== Most points for the Roosters =====
Qualification: 20 points

Rank	Player	2026 club	M	T	G	FG	Points
1	Jocelyn Kelleher		64	8	169	1	371
2	Jessica Sergis		49	40	0	0	160
3	Jayme Fressard		40	35	0	0	140
4	Isabelle Kelly		66	30	0	0	120
5	Brydie Parker		54	28	0	0	112
6	Olivia Kernick		60	24	0	0	96
7	Zahara Temara		24	2	43	1	95
8	Tarryn Aiken		37	18	6	1	85
9	Mia Wood		31	16	0	0	64
9	Taina Naividi		26	16	0	0	64
11	Corban Baxter		44	13	0	0	52
12	Amber Hall		31	12	0	0	48
13	Otesa Pule		53	11	0	0	44
14	Samantha Bremner	—	15	8	0	0	32
15	Jasmin Strange		38	7	0	0	28
16	Rima Butler		25	6	0	0	24
17	Taleena Simon	—	5	5	0	0	20
17	Millie Elliott		31	5	0	0	20

===== Most tries for the Roosters =====
Qualification: 5 tries

Rank	Player	Tries
1	Jessica Sergis	40
2	Jayme Fressard	35
3	Isabelle Kelly	30
4	Brydie Parker	28
5	Olivia Kernick	24
6	Tarryn Aiken	18
7	Mia Wood	16
7	Taina Naividi	16
9	Corban Baxter	13
10	Amber Hall	12
11	Otesa Pule	11
12	Jocelyn Kelleher	8
12	Samantha Bremner	8
14	Jasmin Strange	7
15	Rima Butler	6
16	Taleena Simon	5
16	Millie Elliott	5

===== Most goals for the Roosters =====
All goal kickers

Rank	Player	Goals
1	Jocelyn Kelleher	169
2	Zahara Temara	43
3	Tarryn Aiken	6
4	Kirra Dibb	4
5	Hannah Southwell	3

===== Most field goals for the Roosters =====
Three instances to date

Rank	Player	Field goals
1	Zahara Temara	1
1	Tarryn Aiken	1
1	Jocelyn Kelleher	1

==== Season records ====
Season length has increased over time as the competition has expanded.

===== Most points in a season for the Roosters =====
Qualification: 20 points

Rank	Player	Season	M	T	G	FG	Points
1	Jocelyn Kelleher	2025	13	1	50	1	105
2	Jocelyn Kelleher	2026	13	1	50	0	104
3	Jocelyn Kelleher	2024	11	1	37	0	78
4	Jocelyn Kelleher	2023	10	2	32	0	72
5	Jessica Sergis	2026	13	17	0	0	68
6	Brydie Parker	2026	13	14	0	0	56
7	Jayme Fressard	2026	10	13	0	0	52
8	Zahara Temara	2022	6	1	21	0	46
9	Taina Naividi	2025	11	11	0	0	44
10	Jessica Sergis	2025	13	8	0	0	32
10	Tarryn Aiken	2026	11	5	6	0	32
12	Corban Baxter	2023	10	7	0	0	28
12	Jessica Sergis	2023	6	7	0	0	28
12	Isabelle Kelly	2025	12	7	0	0	28
12	Olivia Kernick	2025	13	7	0	0	28
16	Jayme Fressard	2023	8	6	0	0	24
16	Samantha Bremner	2024	10	6	0	0	24
16	Jayme Fressard	2024	9	6	0	0	24
16	Olivia Kernick	2024	11	6	0	0	24
16	Isabelle Kelly	2026	13	6	0	0	24
16	Sariah Paki	2026	13	6	0	0	24
22	Zahara Temara	2020	4	1	9		22
23	Zahara Temara	2021	7	0	10	1	21
24	Jayme Fressard	2022	5	5	0	0	20
24	Tarryn Aiken	2023	10	5	0	0	20
24	Isabelle Kelly	2023	10	5	0	0	20
24	Otesa Pule	2023	10	5	0	0	20
24	Amber Hall	2024	10	5	0	0	20
24	Jessica Sergis	2024	5	5	0	0	20
24	Mia Wood	2024	9	5	0	0	20
24	Tarryn Aiken	2025	7	5	0	0	20
24	Rima Butler	2025	13	5	0	0	20
24	Jayme Fressard	2025	8	5	0	0	20
24	Mia Wood	2025	13	5	0	0	20
24	Keeley Nizza	2026	13	5	0	0	20

===== Most tries in a season for the Roosters =====
Qualification: 5 tries

Rank	Player	Season	M	Tries
1	Jessica Sergis	2026	13	17
2	Brydie Parker	2026	13	14
3	Jayme Fressard	2026	10	13
4	Taina Naividi	2025	11	11
5	Jessica Sergis	2025	13	8
6	Corban Baxter	2023	10	7
6	Jessica Sergis	2023	6	7
6	Isabelle Kelly	2025	12	7
6	Olivia Kernick	2025	13	7
10	Jayme Fressard	2023	8	6
10	Samantha Bremner	2024	10	6
10	Jayme Fressard	2024	9	6
10	Olivia Kernick	2024	11	6
10	Isabelle Kelly	2026	13	6
10	Sariah Paki	2026	13	6
16	Jayme Fressard	2022	5	5
16	Tarryn Aiken	2023	10	5
16	Isabelle Kelly	2023	10	5
16	Otesa Pule	2023	10	5
16	Amber Hall	2024	10	5
16	Jessica Sergis	2024	5	5
16	Mia Wood	2024	9	5
16	Tarryn Aiken	2025	7	5
16	Rima Butler	2025	13	5
16	Jayme Fressard	2025	8	5
16	Mia Wood	2025	13	5
16	Keeley Nizza	2026	13	5

==== Match records ====
===== Most points in a game for the Roosters =====
Qualification: 12 points

Rank	Player	Date	Opponent	Venue	T	G	FG	Points
1	Jocelyn Kelleher	23 Aug 2026	Warriors	Allianz Stadium	0	9	0	18
2	Jocelyn Kelleher	23 Aug 2025	Eels	CommBank Stadium	0	8	0	16
2	Taleena Simon	22 Sep 2018	Dragons	Allianz Stadium	4	0	0	16
2	Jocelyn Kelleher	16 Sep 2023	Cowboys	Netstrata Jubilee Stadium	1	6	0	16
5	Jocelyn Kelleher	3 Sep 2023	Eels	Industree Group Stadium	0	7	0	14
5	Zahara Temara	2 Sep 2022	Dragons	Allianz Stadium	1	5	0	14
5	Jocelyn Kelleher	5 Sep 2026	Cowboys	Queensland Country Bank Stadium	0	7	0	14
5	Jocelyn Kelleher	10 Sep 2026	Bulldogs	Allianz Stadium	1	5	0	14
9	Jayme Fressard	13 Aug 2023	Sharks	PointsBet Stadium	3	0	0	12
9	Jocelyn Kelleher	26 Aug 2023	Tigers	Allianz Stadium	1	4	0	12
9	Mia Wood	26 Aug 2023	Tigers	Allianz Stadium	3	0	0	12
9	Taina Naividi	6 Jul 2025	Warriors	Allianz Stadium	3	0	0	12
9	Taina Naividi	23 Aug 2025	Eels	CommBank Stadium	3	0	0	12
9	Jayme Fressard	26 Jul 2026	Tigers	Leichhardt Oval	3	0	0	12
9	Jocelyn Kelleher	26 Jul 2026	Tigers	Leichhardt Oval	0	6	0	12
9	Brydie Parker	15 Aug 2026	Broncos	Suncorp Stadium	3	0	0	12
9	Brydie Parker	23 Aug 2026	Warriors	Allianz Stadium	3	0	0	12
9	Brydie Parker	4 Oct 2026	Broncos	Accor Stadium	3	0	0	12

===== Most tries in a game for the Roosters =====
Qualification: 3 tries

Rank	Player	Date	Opponent	Venue	Tries
1	Taleena Simon	22 Sep 2018	Dragons	Allianz Stadium	4
2	Jayme Fressard	13 Aug 2023	Sharks	PointsBet Stadium	3
2	Mia Wood	26 Aug 2023	Tigers	Allianz Stadium	3
2	Taina Naividi	6 Jul 2025	Warriors	Allianz Stadium	3
2	Taina Naividi	23 Aug 2025	Eels	CommBank Stadium	3
2	Jayme Fressard	26 Jul 2026	Tigers	Leichhardt Oval	3
2	Jessica Sergis	1 Aug 2026	Dragons	Geohex Park, Wagga Wagga	3
2	Brydie Parker	15 Aug 2026	Broncos	Suncorp Stadium	3
2	Brydie Parker	23 Aug 2026	Warriors	Allianz Stadium	3
2	Brydie Parker	4 Oct 2026	Broncos	Accor Stadium	3

===== Most goals in a game for the Roosters =====
Qualification: 5 goals

Rank	Player	Date	Opponent	Venue	Goals
1	Jocelyn Kelleher	23 Aug 2026	Warriors	Allianz Stadium	9
2	Jocelyn Kelleher	23 Aug 2025	Eels	CommBank Stadium	8
3	Jocelyn Kelleher	3 Sep 2023	Eels	Industree Group Stadium	7
3	Jocelyn Kelleher	5 Sep 2026	Cowboys	Queensland Country Bank Stadium	7
4	Jocelyn Kelleher	16 Sep 2023	Cowboys	Netstrata Jubilee Stadium	6
4	Jocelyn Kelleher	26 Jul 2026	Tigers	Leichhardt Oval	6
6	Zahara Temara	2 Sep 2022	Dragons	Allianz Stadium	5
6	Zahara Temara	18 Sep 2022	Titans	Central Coast Stadium	5
6	Jocelyn Kelleher	4 Aug 2024	Raiders	Allianz Stadium	5
6	Jocelyn Kelleher	20 Jul 2025	Broncos	Totally Workwear Stadium	5
6	Jocelyn Kelleher	2 Aug 2025	Tigers	McDonald Jones Stadium	5
6	Jocelyn Kelleher	17 Aug 2025	Knights	Polytec Stadium	5
6	Jocelyn Kelleher	1 Aug 2026	Dragons	Geohex Park, Wagga Wagga	5
6	Jocelyn Kelleher	10 Sep 2026	Bulldogs	Allianz Stadium	5

==== Oldest and youngest players ====
The oldest and youngest players to represent the Sydney Roosters NRLW team.

Name	Age	Year
Kylie Hilder	42 and 182 days	2018
Logan Fletcher	18 and 12 days	2025

==== First try and last try ====
Player who scored the first try and most recent try for the Roosters.

Name	Year	Round	Minute	Opponent
Isabelle Kelly	2018	1	26'	Warriors
Brydie Parker	2026	GF	56'	Broncos

=== Margins and streaks ===
Biggest winning margins
Qualification: 25 point margin

Margin	Score	Opponent	Venue	Date	Round
58	66—8	Warriors	Allianz Stadium	23 Aug 2026	8
50	56—6	Cowboys	Queensland Country Bank Stadium	5 Sep 2026	10
44	56—12	Eels	CommBank Stadium	23 Aug 2025	8
40	40—0	Sharks	PointsBet Stadium	8 Sep 2024	7
40	46—6	Eels	Polytec Stadium	9 Aug 2026	6
38	48—10	Tigers	Allianz Stadium	26 Aug 2023	6
38	48—10	Tigers	Leichhardt Oval	26 Jul 2026	4
34	46—12	Eels	Industree Group Stadium	3 Sep 2023	7
30	30—0	Dragons	Sydney Cricket Ground	3 Aug 2023	3
30	34—4	Tigers	McDonald Jones Stadium	2 Aug 2025	5
30	30—0	Cowboys	Queensland Country Bank Stadium	30 Aug 2025	9
30	40—10	Sharks	Polytec Stadium	11 Sep 2025	11
30	38—8	Dragons	Geohex Park, Wagga Wagga	1 Aug 2026	5
30	42—12	Bulldogs	Allianz Stadium	10 Sep 2026	11
28	34—6	Dragons	Allianz Stadium	2 Sep 2022	3
28	36—8	Sharks	Allianz Stadium	29 Aug 2026	9
26	26—0	Dragons	Allianz Stadium	22 Sep 2018	3
26	38—12	Titans	Central Coast Stadium	18 Sep 2022	5

Biggest losing margins
Qualification: 10 point margin

Margin	Score	Opponent	Venue	Date	Round
22	12—34	Broncos	ANZ Stadium	30 Sep 2018	Grand Final
20	0—20	Broncos	AAMI Park	21 Sep 2019	2
20	6—26	Titans	Cbus Super Stadium	25 Aug 2024	5
16	4—20	Broncos	McDonald Jones Stadium	27 Feb 2022	1
16	4—20	Knights	McDonald Jones Stadium	09 Sep 2023	8
14	10—24	Eels	Suncorp Stadium	25 Sep 2022	Semi-final
12	0—12	Titans	Allianz Stadium	24 Sep 2023	Semi-final
10	10—20	Broncos	ANZ Stadium	25 Oct 2020	Grand Final
10	16—26	Titans	WIN Stadium	6 Mar 2022	2
10	4—14	Broncos	Allianz Stadium	14 Sep 2018	2

Most consecutive wins

- 18 (1 September 2024 — 6 October 2024, 6 July 2025 — 27 September 2025)
- 12 (4 July 2026 — 27 September 2026) (current)
- 7 (3 April 2022 — 10 April 2022, 20 August 2022 — 18 September 2022)

Most consecutive losses

- 4 (30 September 2018 — 29 September 2019)
- 4 (17 October 2020 — 6 March 2022)

Biggest comeback

- Recovered from 16 point deficit
- Trailed Brisbane Broncos 0-16 after 19 minutes in 2021 Semi Final at Leichhardt Oval on April 3 2022 and won 22-16 (NRLW Premiership record)

Worst collapse

- Surrendered 6 point leads (three times)
- Led New Zealand Warriors 6-0 after 26 minutes at AAMI Park on September 14 2019 and lost 12-16.
- Led St George Illawarra Dragons 6-0 after 13 minutes at Leichhardt Oval on September 29 2019 and lost 16-24.
- Led Brisbane Broncos 18-12 after 60 minutes in 2025 NRL Women's Grand Final at Accor Stadium and lost 18-22.

First game and first win

Result	Score	Opponent	Venue	Date	Round
Lost	4–10	New Zealand Warriors	ANZ Stadium	8 Sep 2018	1
Won	26–0	St. George Illawarra Dragons	Allianz Stadium	22 Sep 2018	3

=== Grand Final appearances ===
Result	Score	Opponent	Venue	Date
Lost	12–34	Brisbane Broncos	ANZ Stadium	30 Sep 2018
Lost	10–20	Brisbane Broncos	ANZ Stadium	25 Oct 2020
Won	16–4	St. George Illawarra Dragons	Moreton Daily Stadium	10 Apr 2022
Won	32–28	Cronulla Sharks	Accor Stadium	6 Oct 2024
Lost	18–22	Brisbane Broncos	Accor Stadium	5 Oct 2025

== Individual awards ==
=== Club awards ===
The Sydney Roosters Player of the Year and other award winners since 2018.

Season	Player of the Year	Player's Player	Members' Award	Rookie of the Year	Community	Try of the Year	Ref
2018	Zahara Temara	—	—	—	—	—	
2019	Tallisha Harden	—	—	—	Simaima Taufa	—	
2020	Hannah Southwell	Zahara Temara	—	Filomina Hanisi	—	—	
2021	Isabelle Kelly	Sarah Togatuki	—	Olivia Kernick	Jocelyn Kelleher	Isabelle Kelly	
2022	Raecene McGregor	Isabelle Kelly	—	Otesa Pule	Olivia Kernick	Leianne Tufuga	
2023	Tarryn Aiken	Corban Baxter	—	Mia Wood	Brydie Parker	Tarryn Aiken	
2024	Olivia Kernick	Isabelle Kelly	Isabelle Kelly	Eliza Lopamaua	—	Tarryn Aiken	
2025	Olivia Kernick	Taina Naividi	Isabelle Kelly	Macie Carlile	Olivia Kernick	Isabelle Kelly	
2026	Tarryn Aiken	Jessica Sergis	Jessica Sergis	Sariah Paki	Millie Elliott	Otesa Pule	

Note: Filomina Hanisi received a Rising Star Award in 2020.

=== Dally M winners ===
Name	Year
Raecene McGregor	2022
Olivia Kernick	2024

== History ==
On 27 March 2018, the Sydney Roosters applied for, and won, a license to participate in the inaugural 2018 NRL Women's season. Adam Hartigan was named as the coach of the women's side.

In June 2018, the club used up the maximum of fifteen marquee signings ahead of the inaugural season which subsequently commenced in September. Players signed included Karina Brown, Isabelle Kelly and Ruan Sims.

The club finished runners-up in the inaugural NRL Women's Premiership, losing to the Brisbane Broncos by 34–12 in the 2018 NRL Women's Premiership Grand Final. Zahara Temara claimed the 2018 Player of the Season award.

In 2019, Rick Stone took over as coach. The club, however, failed to win a match, claiming the wooden spoon. Tallisha Harden was awarded the club's Best & Fairest Player for the 2019 season.

Jamie Feeney was appointed the head coach for the 2020 season, being determined to turn the club's fortunes around. He was assisted by Kylie Hilder and John Strange. Feeney immediately appointed Corban McGregor as the clubs new captain. The club also announced the big signing of Sevens Rugby star and 2016 gold medalist, Charlotte Caslick. In his first season, Feeney took the side to the Grand Final; however, they fell short, going down 20–10 as the Brisbane Broncos claimed a three-peat of premierships.

In 2021, John Strange was appointed the head coach with Kylie Hilder staying on as assistant coach. After a tough start to the season, the Roosters snuck into the finals in fourth place before upsetting defending champs Brisbane Broncos in the semi-final and then defeating the highly fancied St George-Illawarra Dragons in the Grand Final (played at Moreton Daily Stadium, Redcliffe) to claim the club's inaugural NRLW title.

John Strange added to his success in 2022 by claiming the club's first NRLW Minor Premiership (5 wins, 0 losses) before being eliminated by the Parramatta Eels in an upset semi-final loss. Season 2023 followed a similar path with the club finishing second (8 wins, 2 losses) in the Premiership rounds before once again falling short in the semi-final, this time at the hands of the Gold Coast Titans.

=== First team ===
The first ever Sydney Roosters team played the New Zealand Warriors on 8 September 2018 at ANZ Stadium. The New Zealand Warriors won the match 10-4.

Jersey	Position	Player
1	Fullback	Botille Vette-Welsh
2	Wing	Karina Brown
3	Centre	Shontelle Stowers
4	Centre	Isabelle Kelly
5	Wing	Taleena Simon
6	Five-eighth	Lavina O'Mealey
7	Halfback	Maddie Studdon
8	Prop	Simaima Taufa (c)
9	Hooker	Kylie Hilder
10	Prop	Elianna Walton
11	Second-row	Tazmin Rapana
12	Second-row	Vanessa Foliaki
13	Lock	Zahara Temara
14	Hooker	Nita Maynard-Perrin
15	Prop	Sarah Togatuki
16	Prop	Chloe Caldwell
17	Prop	Victoria Latu
Coach		Adam Hartigan

=== Premiership winning teams ===
The Sydney Roosters premiership winning teams from the 2021 and 2024 NRL Women's Premiership Grand Final.

2021 Grand Final v St George Illawarra Dragons

Fulltime score: Sydney Roosters 16 def St George Illawarra Dragons 4 at Moreton Daily Stadium 10 April 2022.

Jersey	Position	Player
1	Fullback	Corban Baxter (c)
2	Wing	Leianne Tufuga
3	Centre	Jessica Sergis
4	Centre	Isabelle Kelly (c)
5	Wing	Brydie Parker
6	Five-eighth	Zahara Temara
7	Halfback	Raecene McGregor
8	Prop	Sarah Togatuki
9	Hooker	Olivia Higgins
10	Prop	Mya Hill-Moana
11	Second-row	Yasmin Meakes
12	Second-row	Olivia Kernick
13	Lock	Hannah Southwell
14	Halfback	Jocelyn Kelleher
15	Lock	Keilee Joseph
16	Prop	Tayla Predebon
17	Lock	Simone Karpani
Coach		John Strange

2024 Grand Final v Cronulla Sharks

Fulltime score: Sydney Roosters 32 def Cronulla Sharks 28 at Moreton Daily Stadium 6 April 2024.

Jersey	Position	Player
1	Fullback	Sam Bremner
2	Wing	Jayme Fressard
3	Centre	Jessica Sergis
4	Centre	Isabelle Kelly (c)
5	Wing	Brydie Parker
6	Five-eighth	Jocelyn Kelleher
7	Halfback	Tarryn Aiken
8	Prop	Millie Elliott
9	Hooker	Keeley Davis
10	Prop	Otesa Pule
11	Second-row	Amber Hall
12	Second-row	Olivia Kernick
13	Lock	Tiana Davison
14	Lock	Tavarna Papalii
15	Second-row	Jasmin Strange
16	Prop	Samantha Economos
17	Prop	Kalosipani Hopoate
Coach		John Strange

== Representative honours ==
=== National team representatives ===
Past and current players who have been selected to play for a national women's team and competed internationally.

Player	Club debut	Country	International debut	Years	Ref
Tarryn Aiken	22 Jul 2023	Australia	**2 Nov 2022**	2023–2025	
Corban Baxter	14 Sep 2019	Australia	**6 May 2016**	2019	
Samantha Bremner	20 Aug 2022	Australia	**5 Jul 2013**	2022	
Karina Brown	8 Sep 2018	Australia	**5 Jul 2013**	2018	
Rima Butler	6 Jul 2025	Australia	26 Oct 2025	2025	
Keeley Davis	22 Jul 2023	Australia	**13 Oct 2018**	2023–2025	
Tiana Davison	18 Aug 2024	New Zealand	**21 Oct 2023**	2024	
Kirra Dibb	14 Sep 2019	Australia	25 Oct 2019	2019	
Millie Elliott	22 Jul 2023	Australia	**25 Oct 2019**	2024	
Amber Hall	22 Jul 2023	New Zealand	**5 Jul 2013**	2024	
Tallisha Harden	14 Sep 2019	Australia	**3 May 2015**	2019	
Mya Hill-Moana	6 Mar 2022	New Zealand	25 Jun 2022	2022–2023	
Kalosipani Hopoate	20 Aug 2022	Tonga	**25 Jun 2022**	2024	
Keilee Joseph	27 Feb 2022	Australia	6 Nov 2022	2022	
Isabelle Kelly	8 Sep 2018	Australia	**5 May 2017**	2018–2019, 2022–2025	
Olivia Kernick	27 Feb 2022	Australia	2 Nov 2022	2022–2023, 2025	
Eliza Lopamaua	25 Jul 2024	Samoa	19 Oct 2025	2025	
Nita Maynard-Perrin	8 Sep 2018	New Zealand	**16 Nov 2017**	2018–2019	
Raecene McGregor	27 Feb 2022	New Zealand	**19 Nov 2017**	2022	
Taina Naividi	25 Jul 2024	Fiji	26 Oct 2024	2024	
Tavarna Papalii	18 Nov 2024	Samoa	**19 Oct 2024**	2024–2025	
Amelia Pasikala	3 Aug 2023	New Zealand	14 Oct 2023	2023	
Otesa Pule	20 Aug 2022	New Zealand	2 Nov 2022	2022–2025	
Tazmin Rapana	8 Sep 2018	Australia	13 Oct 2018	2018	
Jessica Sergis	27 Feb 2022	Australia	**25 Oct 2019**	2022–2025	
Hannah Southwell	14 Sep 2019	Australia	**13 Oct 2018**	2019	
Kiana Takairangi	14 Sep 2019	New Zealand	**22 Jun 2019**	2019	
Simaima Taufa	8 Sep 2018	Australia	**9 Nov 2014**	2018–2019	
Zahara Temara	8 Sep 2018	Australia	**5 May 2017**	2018	
Elianna Walton	8 Sep 2018	Australia	**13 Oct 2018**	2018	

Notes:

- International Debut dates in **bold** indicate that the player made her first international appearance prior to playing for the Sydney Roosters NRLW team.
- Tavarna Papalii was a member of the Roosters NRLW squad in 2025 but did not play an NRLW match. Injured playing for Queensland in the third State of Origin match, Papalii returned to play in Round 9 of the 2025 NSWRL Women's Premiership.

=== Women's State of Origin representatives ===
Past and current players who have played for Queensland and New South Wales in the State of Origin.

Player	State	Year(s)
Corban Baxter	New South Wales	2018–2021, 2024
Yasmin Clydsdale	New South Wales	2020–2022
Keeley Davis	New South Wales	2023–2025
Kirra Dibb	New South Wales	2019
Millie Elliott	New South Wales	2023–2024
Vanessa Foliaki	New South Wales	2018
Jayme Fressard	New South Wales	2025
Melanie Howard	New South Wales	2020
Jocelyn Kelleher	New South Wales	2025
Isabelle Kelly	New South Wales	2018–2019, 2021–2025
Olivia Kernick	New South Wales	2022–2025
Nita Maynard-Perrin	New South Wales	2018
Shanice Parker	New South Wales	2020
Jessica Sergis	New South Wales	2022–2025
Hannah Southwell	New South Wales	2019–2022
Shontelle Stowers	New South Wales	2019
Maddie Studdon	New South Wales	2018
Simaima Taufa	New South Wales	2018–2020
Filomina Hanisi	New South Wales	2020–2021
Sarah Togatuki	New South Wales	2020–2022
Tarryn Aiken	Queensland	2023–2025
Tavarna Papalii	Queensland	2025
Tazmin Rapana	Queensland	2018
Zahara Temara	Queensland	2018, 2020 – 2021

=== All-Stars representatives ===
Past and current players who have played for the Indigenous All-Stars or for the Māori All-Stars.

==== Indigenous All Stars ====
Player	Year(s)
Keilee Joseph	2022 – 2023
Olivia Kernick	2022, 2024– 2025

==== Māori All Stars (Māori people) ====
Player	Year(s)
Raecene McGregor	2022
Corban Baxter	2022, 2024, 2026
Mya Hill-Moana	2022 – 2024
Jasmin Strange	2024 – 2026
Rima Butler	2025 – 2026
Olivia Kernick	2023
