= Kasey Badger =

Australian rugby league referee

Personal information
- Born: 11 March 1987 (age 39) Australia

Refereeing information
| Years | Competition | Apps |
| 2018– | NRL Women's Premiership | 18 |
| 2012– | Internationals | 2 |
- Source: As of 23 October 2022

Kasey Badger is an Australian rugby league referee. She is the first woman to referee a match in the Men's Rugby League World Cup.

Raised in Parramatta, Badger took up refereeing at an early age after having to make the decision between being a player or an official.

Having worked her way through the junior ranks, Badger was refereeing matches in the NSW Cup when she was one of the first two women (along with Belinda Sharpe) appointed to the National Rugby League (NRL) team of full-time officials in 2019. Since then, Badger has been a touch judge in the NRL and has refereed games in the NRL Women's Premiership (NRLW) including the 2018, 2019 and 2022 NRLW Grand Finals.

Badger's first experience as an international referee was in 2012 when she and her husband Gavin were the two referees in a match between Thailand and the Philippines. Badger refereed the women's international between New Zealand and Tonga in June 2022.

Badger was one of three women named in the officials squad for the 2021 Rugby League World Cup and on 20 October 2022 was named as the referee for the match between Wales and Tonga to be played on 24 October 2022, the first woman named to referee a men's World Cup game.

In August 2023, Badger became the second woman referee to take charge of an NRL match under the solo referee system. Both she and Belinda Sharpe were allocated games in round 27 of the 2023 NRL season with Badger taking charge of the Gold Coast Titans v Canterbury Bulldogs on 3 September. As Sharpe had refereed the Manly v Wests Tigers match on 1 September, Sharpe became the first woman to referee solo.

In August 2024, the NRL stopped Badger from officiating South Sydney games while her husband Gavin was employed by South Sydney as a refereeing consultant to avoid any conflict of interest.
