= Keeley Davis (rugby league) =

Australia international rugby league player (born 2000)

Keeley Nizza
Personal information
- Born: Keeley Davis; 5 July 2000 (age 26) Wollongong, New South Wales, Australia
- Height: 165 cm (5 ft 5 in)
- Weight: 68 kg (10 st 10 lb)

Playing information
- Position: Hooker, Five-eighth
Club
Years	Team	Pld	T	G	FG	P
2018–22	St George Illawarra Dragons	23	1	0	0	4
2023–	Sydney Roosters	32	6	0	0	24
	Total	55	7	0	0	28
Representative
Years	Team	Pld	T	G	FG	P
2018–	Australia	12	3	0	0	12
2018	Prime Minister's XIII	1	0	0	0	0
2019–	Australia 9s	3	1	0	0	5
2021–26	New South Wales	13	2	0	0	8
- Source: As of 16 November 2026

Keeley Nizza (née Davis) (born 5 July 2000) is an Australian rugby league footballer who plays for the Sydney Roosters in the NRL Women's Premiership and the Illawarra Steelers in the NSWRL Women's Premiership.

She primarily plays as a hooker and has represented NSW and Australia. Davis is a World Cup winner, playing in last year's rescheduled World Cup in the UK.

== Background ==
Davis was born in Wollongong and played her junior rugby league for the Corrimal Cougars before joining the Illawarra Steelers in the Tarsha Gale Cup.

== Playing career ==
=== 2018 ===
In June, Davis represented NSW Country at the Women's National Championships. On 26 July, she signed with the St George Illawarra Dragons for the inaugural NRL Women's Premiership season.

In Round 1 of the 2018 NRL Women's season, she made her debut for the Dragons as an 18-year old in their 4–30 loss to the Brisbane Broncos.

On 6 October, she represented the Prime Minister's XIII in their win over Papua New Guinea. On 13 October, she made her Test debut for Australia in their 26–24 win over New Zealand.

=== 2019 ===
In May, she again represented NSW Country at the Women's National Championships. On 6 October, she started at five-eighth in the Dragons' Grand Final loss to the Brisbane Broncos. Later that month, she represented Australia at the 2019 Rugby League World Cup 9s and in a 28–8 win over New Zealand.

=== 2020 ===
In February, she was a member of the Dragons' 2020 NRL Nines-winning team. At the Dragons' end of season awards, she won the club's Coach's Award.

On 10 November, she was named to make her Women's State of Origin debut at hooker for New South Wales but was ruled out on gameday due to injury.

=== 2021 ===
Keeley was a member of the Dragons team that finished in 2nd place during the season and lost 16-4 to the Sydney Roosters in the grand final at Leichhardt Oval on 10 April 2022.

=== 2022 ===
Keeley is a member of the Dragons team in the 2022 NRLW season.

=== 2023 ===
Keeley Joined the Sydney Roosters NRLW team. They finished 2nd on the NRLW ladder. They lost in round 3 of the NRLW finals series to the Gold Coast Titans 12-0.

2024 Keeley played her second season with the Sydney Roosters and won her maiden NRLW premiership as the Roosters beat the Cronulla Sharks 32-28 in the Grand Final.

== Achievements and accolades ==
=== Individual ===
- St George Illawarra Dragons Coach's Award: 2020

Captained St George Illawarra Dragons NRLW in 2021.

=== Representative ===
- Rugby League World Cup Champion: 2026
