= Jessica Sergis =

Australia international rugby league footballer

Personal information
- Born: 15 September 1997 (age 29) Sydney, New South Wales, Australia
- Height: 173 cm (5 ft 8 in)
- Weight: 75 kg (11 st 11 lb)

Playing information
- Position: Centre
Club
Years	Team	Pld	T	G	FG	P
2018–20	St. George Illawarra	10	5	0	0	20
2021–	Sydney Roosters	40	27	0	0	108
	Total	50	32	0	0	128
Representative
Years	Team	Pld	T	G	FG	P
2017–26	New South Wales	15	9	0	0	36
2019–26	Australia	18	23	0	0	92
2019	Australia 9s	5	1	0	0	4
- Source: As of 16 November 2026
- Partner: Tommy Talau

Jessica Sergis (born 15 September 1997) is an Australian international rugby league footballer who plays for the Sydney Roosters in the NRL Women's Premiership and the North Sydney Bears in the NSWRL Women's Premiership.

== Career ==
In 2016, Sergis began playing for Cronulla-Caringbah Sharks.

In 2017, she debuted in the New South Wales 22-6 win over the Queensland women's rugby league team, scoring 3 tries on the wing.

In 2018, she played 3 matches in the Women's rugby league Premiership playing for the St. George Illawarra Dragons at centre.

On 8 June 2019, Sergis was named in the squad to represent New South Wales in the 2019 Women's State of Origin match. On 14 June, she extended her stay with the St. George Illawarra Dragons for the 2019 NRLW season. On 21 June, she scored one try in the Women's State of Origin match, helping the Blues to fourth-consecutive victory over Queensland. With three tries, a try assist, 21 tackle breaks and an average of 153 metres per match in three appearances in the NRLW regular season, she was named the Dally M NRLW Player of the Year at the 2019 Dally M Awards on 2 October. On 14 October, she was named the first-ever RLPA NRLW Player of the Year at the RLPA Awards.

== Honours ==
=== Individual ===
- Dally M Player of the Year: 2019
- RLPA Player of the Year: 2019

=== Representative ===
- Rugby League World Cup Champion: 2026

=== Club ===
NRLW Grand Finals
Year	Team	Opposition	Venue	Score	Result
2019	St. George Illawarra	Brisbane Broncos	ANZ Stadium	6 – 30	Runners-up

== Statistics ==
=== NRLW ===
Table data:
Season	Team	Matches	T	G	GK %	F/G	Pts	W	L	D	W-L %
2018	St. George Illawarra	3	1	0	—	0	4	1	2	0	33.3
2019	St. George Illawarra	4	3	0	—	0	12	2	2	0	50.0
2020	St. George Illawarra	3	1	0	—	0	4	0	0	0	
2021	Sydney Roosters	6	1	0	—	0	4	0	0	0	
2022	Sydney Roosters	6	2	0	—	0	8	0	0	0	
2023	Sydney Roosters	6	7	0	—	0	28	0	0	0	
2024	Sydney Roosters	5	5	0	—	0	20	0	0	0	
2025	Sydney Roosters	13	8	0	—	0	32	0	0	0	
2026	Sydney Roosters	0	0	0	—	0	0	0	0	0	
Career totals		46	28	0	—	0	112	3	4	0	42.9

=== State of Origin ===
†	Denotes years in which Sergis won a State of Origin match

Table data:
Season	Team	Matches	T	G	GK %	F/G	Pts	W	L	D	W-L %
2017†	New South Wales	1	3	0	—	0	12	1	0	0	100
2019†	New South Wales	1	1	0	—	0	4	1	0	0	100
Career totals		2	4	0	—	0	16	2	0	0	100

== Personal life ==
In 2024, Sergis began a relationship with Sydney Roosters NRL player Tommy Talau. The pair became engaged in April 2026.
