= Belinda Sharpe =

Australian rugby league referee

Personal information
- Born: Rockhampton, Queensland, Australia

Refereeing information
Years	Competition	Apps
2019–	National Rugby League	272
2020–	NRL Women's Premiership	44

Belinda Sharpe (née Sleeman) is an Australian rugby league referee and former journalist, and is the first woman to referee a first-grade match in the National Rugby League (NRL).

Sharpe was born and grew up in Rockhampton, Queensland, where she worked as a sports reporter at The Morning Bulletin. She took up officiating in rugby league when she was 18. The first match Sharpe ever refereed was an under-8's fixture at Gracemere.

After officiating at various levels of rugby league in Queensland, Sharpe became the first women to be an official at an NRL game when she was one of the touch judges for the match between Wests Tigers and Cronulla Sharks in the last round of the 2014 NRL season.

At the start of the 2019 season, Sharpe was one of two women, the other being Kasey Badger, to be given full-time referee contracts by the NRL. She took charge of her first match involving an NRL team when she was one of the two match referees in Brisbane Broncos' pre-season game against Wynnum Manly. In her 100th match as an NRL official, Sharpe became the first woman to referee a full NRL match in the round 18 game between Brisbane Broncos and Canterbury-Bankstown Bulldogs on 18 July 2019 at Suncorp Stadium alongside Ben Cummins.

Sharpe has also refereed the 2019 Women's State of Origin and has been a touch judge in several international games including the 2017 Rugby League World Cup tournament and the Tonga v Fiji test match in 2017.

In 2022, Sharpe was appointed as the main referee for the Women's Rugby League World Cup final between New Zealand and Australia.

On 1 September 2023, Sharpe became the first woman to referee an NRL match under the single referee system when she controlled the game between Manly Sea Eagles and West Tigers.
