= Isabelle Kelly =

Australia international rugby league footballer (born 1996)

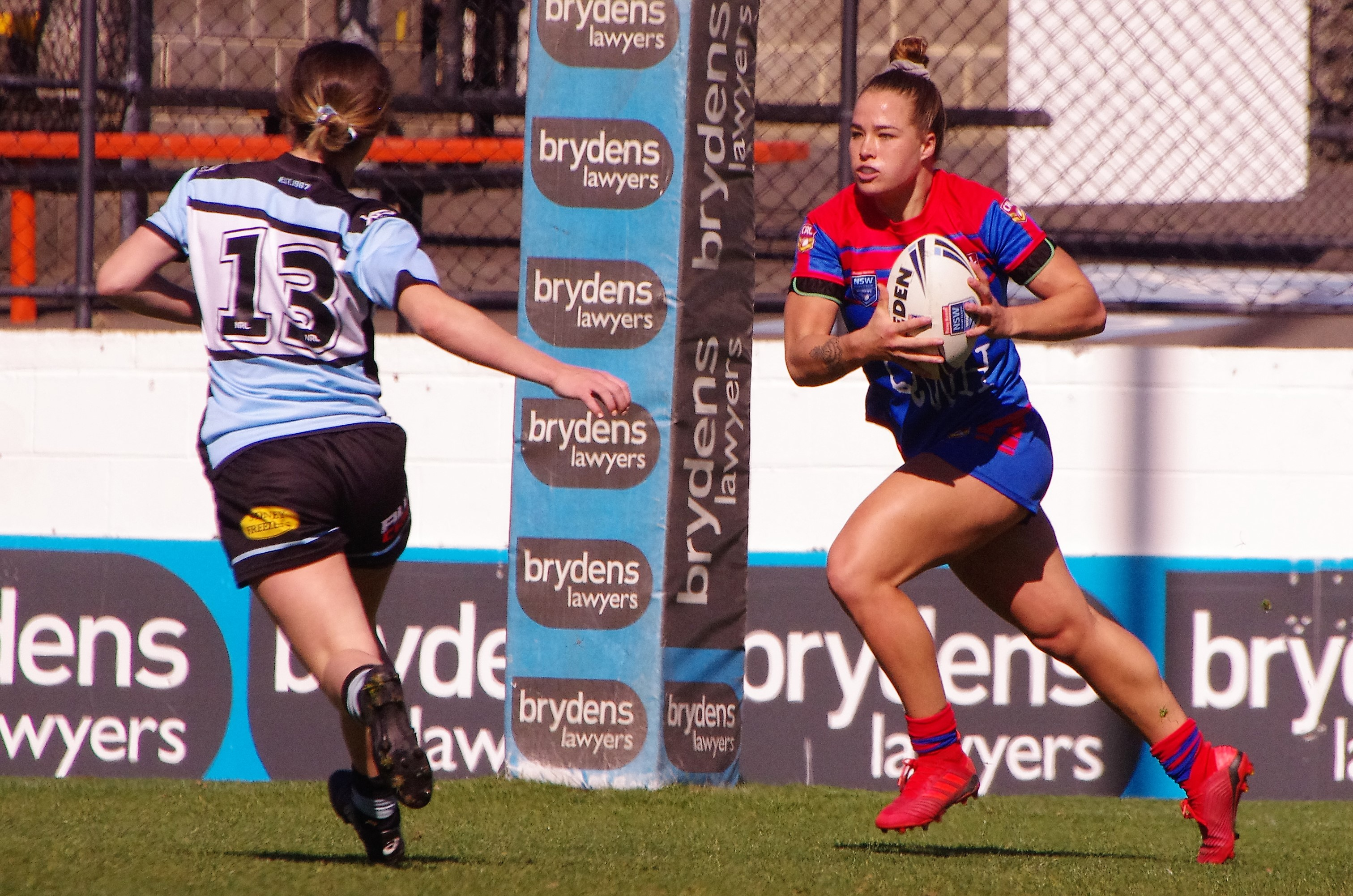
- Kelly (right) in 2019

Personal information
- Full name: Isabelle Maree Kelly
- Born: 20 September 1996 (age 30) Gosford, New South Wales, Australia
- Height: 170 cm (5 ft 7 in)
- Weight: 78 kg (12 st 4 lb)

Playing information
- Position: Centre
Club
Years	Team	Pld	T	G	FG	P
2018–19	Sydney Roosters	7	2	0	0	8
2020	St George Illawarra	2	0	0	0	0
2021–	Sydney Roosters	45	22	0	0	88
	Total	54	24	0	0	96
Representative
Years	Team	Pld	T	G	FG	P
2015–26	New South Wales	16	6	0	0	24
2017–26	Australia	25	21	0	0	84
2017	Women's All Stars	1	0	0	0	0
2019	Australia 9s	4	2	0	0	8
- Source: As of 16 November 2026

Isabelle Maree Kelly (born 20 September 1996) is an Australian rugby league footballer who captains the Sydney Roosters in the NRL Women's Premiership.

Primarily a centre, she is an Australian and New South Wales representative.

== Background ==
Born in Gosford, New South Wales, Kelly played her junior rugby league for the Berkeley Vale Panthers. Her father, Ken, played for the Manly Warringah Sea Eagles in the 1980s, while her brother, Dylan, played for Manly's under-20'sand NSW Cup, played for Burleigh Bears Queensland Cup and represented his state in the NSW Blues resident squad in 2016.

== Playing career ==
In 2015, Kelly made her debut for New South Wales, scoring their only try in a 4–all draw with Queensland.

In 2017, she was a member of the Jillaroos 2017 Women's Rugby League World Cup winning side, scoring the first try in the final against New Zealand.

In June 2018, Kelly was announced as one of fifteen marquee signings by the Sydney Roosters Women's team which will participate in the inaugural NRL Women's Premiership in September 2018.

On 22 June 2018, Kelly scored two tries for New South Wales in their Women's State of Origin win over Queensland and was awarded the Nellie Doherty Medal for Player of the Match.

In Round 1 of the 2018 NRL Women's Premiership, Kelly made her debut for the Sydney Roosters, starting at centre and scoring her side's only try in their 10–4 loss to the New Zealand Warriors.

On 10 September 2018, she was named the NSWRL Women's State of Origin Player of the Year at the Brad Fittler Medal awards in Sydney. In November 2018, she became the inaugural winner of the Women's Golden Boot Award.

On 27 September 2020, Kelly captained the Central Coast Roosters to an undefeated win of the NSWRL Women's Premiership.

During the NRLW game between St. George Illawarra Dragons and Brisbane Broncos on 10 October 2020, Kelly was involved in an incident in which Broncos player Amber Hall pulled her hair and tackled her. Landing on her ankles, she suffered from a syndesmosis injury and was aided by crutches temporarily.

On 16 May 2024, Kelly captained the NSW Blues Women for first game of the first ever three game Women's state of Origin series. She was announced captain again for the Sydney Roosters for the 2024 NRLW season. She finished the normal season with three tries, two of which were scored against the St George Illawarra in round 4, which the Sydney Roosters won 28-8. On 2 October, Dally M Night, Kelly collected Centre of the Year, as well as being nominated for captain of the year. She played in both of the Sydney Roosters finals games, including their 32-28 win in the NRLw Grand Final against the Cronulla Sharks.

== Achievements and accolades ==
=== Representative ===
- Rugby League World Cup Champion: 2026
