= 2025 North Queensland Cowboys Women season =

Season of rugby league team

- NRLW Rank: 4th
- 2025 record: Wins: 7; losses: 4
- Points scored: For: 186; against: 176

Team information
- CEO: Jeff Reibel
- Coach: Ricky Henry
- Captain: Kirra Dibb Emma Manzelmann
- Stadium: Queensland Country Bank Stadium
- Avg. attendance: 5,625
- High attendance: 8,112 (vs. Gold Coast, Rd 1)

Top scorers
- Tries: Fran Goldthorp (6)
- Goals: Kirra Dibb (22)
- Points: Kirra Dibb (52)
← 2024	2026 →

The 2025 North Queensland Cowboys Women season was the 3rd in the club's history. Coached by Ricky Henry and captained by Kirra Dibb and Emma Manzelmann, they competed in the NRLW's 2025 Telstra Women's Premiership.

They finished the regular season in fourth place, their highest ever, playing finals for the first time.

== Season summary ==
=== Milestones ===
- Round 1: Abigail Roache, Rosie Kelly, Hailee-Jay Ormond-Maunsell and Najvada George made their debuts for the club.
- Round 2: Lily Dick made her NRLW debut.
- Round 2: Alisha Foord scored her first NRLW try.
- Round 3: Ana Malupo made her NRLW debut.
- Round 4: Abigail Roache scored her first try for the club.
- Round 5: Rosie Kelly scored her first try for the club.
- Round 7: Tafao Asaua made her debut for the club.
- Round 7: Kirra Dibb scored her 100th point for the club.
- Round 8: The club won three games in a row for the first time.
- Round 9: The club qualified for the finals for the first time.
- Round 10: Lillian Yarrow scored her first NRLW try.
- Round 10: The club scored 40 points for the first time.
- Finals Week 1: The club played in their first finals game.

=== Squad ===
North Queensland Cowboys 2025 NRLW squad
NRLW squad – 2025 season			Development list	Coaching staff
Tafao Asaua – PR; Essay Banu – PR; Krystal Blackwell – WG; Bree Chester – LK; Kirra Dibb (c) – FE; Lily Dick – SR; Alisha Foord – HK; Najvada George – LK; Fran Goldthorp – WG	Tallisha Harden – SR; Rosie Kelly – FE; Ana Malupo – WG; Hailee Ormond-Maunsell – SR; Emma Manzelmann (c) – HK; Lily Peacock – LK; Jasmine Peters – CE; China Polata – SR; Ebony Raftstrand-Smith – WG	Tiana Raftstrand-Smith – SR; Abigail Roache – CE; Tahlulah Tillett – HB; Makenzie Weale – PR; Jakiya Whitfeld – FB; Lillian Yarrow – PR	Tayla Curtis – LK; Jennifer Kimber – CE; Caitlin Tanner – FE; Extended squad: Autumn-Rain Stephens-Daly – WG; Nadia Windleborn – HK	Head coach: Ricky Henry; Assistant coaches: David Faiumu; Ty Williams; Anita Creenaune (head of elite programs); Daniel Strickland (head of performance); Larissa Di Bella (sports scientist); Ebony Bray (team doctor); Maggie Dwyer (physiotherapist); Legend: (c) Captain(s); (vc) Vice-captain(s); Updated: 7 July 2025; Source(s): NQ Cowboys

== Squad movement ==
=== Gains ===
Player	Signed from	Until end of	Notes
Tafao Asaua	Parramatta Eels	2025	
Tayla Curtis	St George Illawarra Dragons	2025	
Lily Dick	Australia rugby sevens	2026	
Najvada George	Wests Tigers	2027	
Rosie Kelly	Parramatta Eels	2027	
Hailee-Jay Ormond-Maunsell	Gold Coast Titans	2025	
Abigail Roache	Newcastle Knights	2027	

=== Losses ===
Player	Signed to	Until end of	Notes
Emily Bella	Mackay Cutters	2025	
Harata Butler	New Zealand Warriors	2026	
Jetaya Faifua	Wests Tigers	2025	
Shellie Long	Northern Pride	2025	
Sareka Mooka	Northern Pride	2025	
Vitalina Naikore	Fijiana Drua	2025	
Shaniah Power	Wigan Warriors	2025	
Libby Surha	Mackay Cutters	2025	
Lavinia Tauhalaliku	New Zealand Warriors	2027	
Jazmon Tupou-Witchman	South Sydney Rabbitohs	2025	

== Ladder ==
Pos	Team	Pld	W	D	L	PF	PA	PD	Pts	Qualification
1	Sydney Roosters	11	11	0	0	366	126	+240	22	Advance to second round of finals series (first-round bye)
2	Brisbane Broncos	11	10	0	1	404	116	+288	20	Advance to second round of finals series (first-round bye)
3	Newcastle Knights	11	7	0	4	258	203	+55	14	Advance to finals series
4	North Queensland Cowboys	11	7	0	4	186	176	+10	14	Advance to finals series
5	Cronulla-Sutherland Sharks	11	6	0	5	217	194	+23	12	Advance to finals series
6	Gold Coast Titans	11	5	1	5	171	194	−23	11	Advance to finals series
7	Parramatta Eels	11	5	0	6	202	234	−32	10	
8	New Zealand Warriors	11	4	0	7	194	198	−4	8	
9	Canterbury-Bankstown Bulldogs	11	3	1	7	162	310	−148	7	
10	St. George Illawarra Dragons	11	3	0	8	164	242	−78	6	
11	Canberra Raiders	11	3	0	8	183	325	−142	6	
12	Wests Tigers	11	1	0	10	100	289	−189	2	

Updated to match(es) played on 31 Aug 2025. Source: National Rugby League Women's

== Fixtures ==
=== Pre-season ===
Date	Round	Opponent	Venue	Score	Tries	Goals	Attendance
Saturday, 21 June	Trial 1	Gold Coast Titans	Seagulls Sports Complex	8 – 16	Blackwell, Kelly		
Legend: Win Loss Draw Bye

=== Regular season ===
Date	Round	Opponent	Venue	Score	Tries	Goals	Attendance
Saturday, 5 July	Round 1	Gold Coast Titans	QCB Stadium	20 – 6	Blackwell, Goldthorp, Manzelmann, Whitfeld	Dibb (2/4)	8,112
Saturday, 12 July	Round 2	Newcastle Knights	QCB Stadium	6 – 26	Foord	Dibb (1/1)	7,268
Saturday, 19 July	Round 3	Cronulla-Sutherland Sharks	Sharks Stadium	16 – 14	Blackwell, Peters, Weale	Kelly (1/2), Manzelmann (1/1)	1,686
Saturday, 26 July	Round 4	Canberra Raiders	QCB Stadium	26 – 0	Blackwell (2), Roache (2), Peters	Manzelmann (2/4), Kelly (1/2)	1,355
Sunday, 3 August	Round 5	New Zealand Warriors	McDonald Jones Stadium	6 – 12	Kelly	Manzelmann (1/1)	6,093
Sunday, 10 August	Round 6	Parramatta Eels	CommBank Stadium	14 – 10	Goldthorp (2), Whitfeld	Dibb (1/3)	1,964
Sunday, 17 August	Round 7	Canterbury-Bankstown Bulldogs	QCB Stadium	22 – 6	Dibb, Peacock, Peters, Whitfeld	Dibb (3/4)	3,360
Sunday, 24 August	Round 8	Wests Tigers	Leichhardt Oval	30 – 8	Dibb, Manzelmann, Peters, Polata, Whitfeld	Dibb (5/5)	2,056
Saturday, 30 August	Round 9	Sydney Roosters	QCB Stadium	0 – 30			8,031
Saturday, 6 September	Round 10	St George Illawarra Dragons	WIN Stadium	42 – 14	Goldthorp (2), Blackwell, Foord, Manzelmann, Roache, Yarrow	Dibb (7/8)	7,040
Saturday, 13 September	Round 11	Brisbane Broncos	Totally Workwear Stadium	4 – 50	Peters	Dibb (0/1)	1,593
Legend: Win Loss Draw Bye

=== Finals ===
Date	Round	Opponent	Venue	Score	Tries	Goals	Attendance
Saturday, 20 September	Elimination	Cronulla-Sutherland Sharks	QCB Stadium	18 – 24	Chester, Goldthorp, Weale	Dibb	5,024
Legend: Win Loss Draw Bye

== Statistics ==
Name	App	T	G	FG	Pts
Tafao Asaua	1	–	–	–	–
Essay Banu	12	–	–	–	–
Krystal Blackwell	12	5	–	–	20
Bree Chester	12	1	–	–	4
Kirra Dibb	9	2	22	–	52
Lily Dick	4	–	–	–	–
Alisha Foord	12	2	–	–	8
Najvada George	4	–	–	–	–
Fran Goldthorp	12	6	–	–	24
Tallisha Harden	11	–	–	–	–
Rosie Kelly	7	1	2	–	8
Ana Malupo	3	–	–	–	–
Emma Manzelmann	12	3	4	–	20
Hailee-Jay Ormond-Maunsell	10	–	–	–	–
Lily Peacock	12	1	–	–	4
Jasmine Peters	12	5	–	–	20
China Polata	3	1	–	–	4
Ebony Raftstrand-Smith	2	–	–	–	–
Tiana Raftstrand-Smith	4	–	–	–	–
Abigail Roache	10	3	–	–	12
Tahlulah Tillett	8	–	–	–	–
Makenzie Weale	11	2	–	–	8
Jakiya Whitfeld	9	4	–	–	16
Lillian Yarrow	12	1	–	–	4
Totals		37	28	–	204

== Representatives ==
The following players played a representative match in 2025.

	Las Vegas Test	All Stars match	State of Origin 1	State of Origin 2	State of Origin 3	Prime Minister's XIII	Pacific Championships
Essay Banu	–	Indigenous All Stars	–	–	–	Papua New Guinea	–
Bree Chester	–	Indigenous All Stars	–	–	–	Australia	–
Kirra Dibb	–	Indigenous All Stars	–	–	–	Australia	–
Tallisha Harden	–	Indigenous All Stars	–	–	–	–	–
Ana Malupo	–	–	–	–	–	–	Tonga
Jasmine Peters		Indigenous All Stars	Queensland	Queensland	Queensland	Australia	–
Tiana Raftstrand-Smith	–	Maori All Stars	–	–	–	–	–
Abigail Roache	–	–	–	–	–	–	New Zealand
Caitlin Tanner	–	–	–	–	–	Papua New Guinea	–
Makenzie Weale			Queensland	Queensland	Queensland	Australia	Australia
Jakiya Whitfeld	Australia	–	–	–	–	–	–
Lillian Yarrow	–	–	–	–	–	Australia	Australia

== Honours ==
=== League ===
- RLPA Dream Team: Emma Manzelmann

=== Club ===
- Player of the Year: Bree Chester
- Players' Player: Fran Goldthorp
- Rookie of the Year: Ana Malupo
- Townsville Bulletin Fan Choice Award: Emma Manzelmann
- The Cowboys Way Award: Abigail Roache
- Members Player of the Year: Emma Manzelmann
