= 2026 North Queensland Cowboys Women season =

Season of rugby league team

- NRLW Rank: 12th
- 2026 record: Wins: 0; losses: 2
- Points scored: For: 22; against: 80

Team information
- CEO: Micheal Luck
- Coach: Ricky Henry
- Captain: Emma Manzelmann
- Stadium: Queensland Country Bank Stadium

Top scorers
- Tries: Fran Goldthorp (2)
- Goals: Emma Manzelmann (1)
- Points: Fran Goldthorp (8)
← 2025	2027 →

The 2026 North Queensland Cowboys Women season is the 4th in the club's history. Coached by Ricky Henry and captained by Emma Manzelmann, they compete in the NRLW's 2026 Telstra Women's Premiership.

== Season summary ==
=== Milestones ===
- Round 1: Tallara Bamblett, Tayla Curtis, Emily Veivers and Sian Williams made their NRLW debuts.
- Round 1: Lydia Turua-Quedley and Margot Vella made their debuts for the club.
- Round 2: Haylee Hifo made her NRLW debut.
- Round 2: Haylee Hifo scored her first NRLW try.
- Round 2: Margot Vella scored her first try for the club.

=== Squad ===
North Queensland Cowboys 2026 NRLW Squad
NRLW Squad – 2026 season			Supplementary list	Coaching Staff
Tafao Asaua – PR; Tallara Bamblett – HB; Essay Banu – PR; Bree Chester – LK; Tayla Curtis – SR; Lily Dick – SR; Alisha Foord – PR; Fran Goldthorp – FB; Tallisha Harden – PR	Haylee Hifo – WG; Rosie Kelly – FE; Jennifer Kimber – FB; Ana Malupo – WG; Emma Manzelmann (c) – HK; Ashley Marsters – PR; Hailee-Jay Ormond-Maunsell – SR; Lily Peacock – PR; Jasmine Peters – CE	Ebony Raftstrand-Smith – WG; Tiana Raftstrand-Smith – SR; Abigail Roache – CE; Lydia Turua-Quedley – HB; Emily Veivers – HK; Margot Vella – WG; Makenzie Weale – PR; Jakiya Whitfeld – FB; Sian Williams – WG	Charlize Lloyd-Phillips – WG; Lyrech Mara – PR; Development list: Jakaia-Lee Collett – SR; Ella Cronin – PR; Kayla Jackson – WG; Nadia Windleborn – HK	Head coach: Ricky Henry; Assistant coaches: David Faiumu; Ty Williams; Anita Creenaune (Head of Elite Programs); Daniel Strickland (Head of Performance); Larissa Di Bella (Sports Scientist); Legend: (c) Captain(s); (vc) Vice-captain(s); Updated: 14 June 2026; Source(s): NQ Cowboys

== Squad movement ==
=== Gains ===
Player	Signed from	Until end of	Notes
Tallara Bamblett	Wests Tigers	2026	
Haylee Hifo	Western Force	2027	
Kayla Jackson	Gold Coast Titans	2026	
Charlize Lloyd-Phillips	Northern Sharks	2026	
Lyrech Mara	Mackay Cutters	2026	
Lydia Turua-Quedley	NZ Warriors	2027	
Emily Veivers	Wigan Warriors	2027	
Margot Vella	St George Illawarra Dragons	2026	
Sian Williams	Northern Pride	2026	

=== Losses ===
Player	Signed to	Until end of	Notes
Krystal Blackwell	Canberra Raiders	2027	
Kirra Dibb	Newcastle Knights	2028	
Najvada George	Cronulla Sharks	2026	
China Polata	Cronulla Sharks	2027	
Autumn-Rain Stephens-Daly	Northern Pride	2026	
Caitlin Tanner	Wynnum Manly Seagulls	2026	
Tahlulah Tillett	Retired	–	
Lillian Yarrow	Brisbane Broncos	2027	

== Fixtures ==
=== Pre-season ===
Date	Round	Opponent	Venue	Score	Tries	Goals	Attendance
Saturday, 20 June	Trial 1	Gold Coast Titans	Jack Manski Oval	24 – 6	Manzelmann (2), Kelly, Turua-Quedley, Veivers, Windleborn		
Legend: Win Loss Draw Bye

=== Regular season ===
Date	Round	Opponent	Venue	Score	Tries	Goals	Attendance
Saturday, 4 July	Round 1	Brisbane Broncos	Suncorp Stadium	4 – 50	Manzelmann	Manzelmann (0/1)	14,371
Saturday, 11 July	Round 2	Wests Tigers	QCB Stadium	18 – 30	Goldthorp (2), Hifo, Vella	Manzelmann (1/2), Kelly (0/2)	2,109
Saturday, 18 July	Round 3	New Zealand Warriors	Go Media Stadium	–			
Saturday, 25 July	Round 4	Gold Coast Titans	QCB Stadium	–			
Saturday, 1 August	Round 5	Canberra Raiders	Geohex Park	–			
Saturday, 8 August	Round 6	Canterbury-Bankstown Bulldogs	Belmore Sports Ground	–			
Sunday, 16 August	Round 7	Cronulla-Sutherland Sharks	QCB Stadium	–			
Saturday, 22 August	Round 8	St George Illawarra Dragons	Allianz Stadium	–			
Saturday, 29 August	Round 9	Newcastle Knights	QCB Stadium	–			
Saturday, 5 September	Round 10	Sydney Roosters	QCB Stadium	–			
Saturday, 12 September	Round 11	Parramatta Eels	Commbank Stadium	–			
Legend: Win Loss Draw Bye

== Statistics ==
Name	App	T	G	FG	Pts
Tafao Asaua	1	–	–	–	–
Tallara Bamblett	2	–	–	–	–
Essay Banu	2	–	–	–	–
Bree Chester	2	–	–	–	–
Tayla Curtis	2	–	–	–	–
Lily Dick	1	–	–	–	–
Fran Goldthorp	2	2	–	–	8
Tallisha Harden	2	–	–	–	–
Haylee Hifo	1	1	–	–	4
Rosie Kelly	2	–	–	–	–
Emma Manzelmann	2	1	1	–	6
Hailee-Jay Ormond-Maunsell	2	–	–	–	–
Jasmine Peters	2	–	–	–	–
Abigail Roache	2	–	–	–	–
Lydia Turua-Quedley	2	–	–	–	–
Emily Veivers	2	–	–	–	–
Margot Vella	2	1	–	–	4
Makenzie Weale	2	–	–	–	–
Sian Williams	1	–	–	–	–
Totals		5	1	–	22

== Representatives ==
The following players played a representative match in 2026.

	All Stars match	State of Origin 1	State of Origin 2	State of Origin 3
Essay Banu	Indigenous All Stars	–	–	–
Bree Chester	Indigenous All Stars	–	–	–
Tallisha Harden	Indigenous All Stars	–	–	–
Emma Manzelmann	–	Queensland	Queensland	Queensland
Jasmine Peters	Indigenous All Stars	–	Queensland	Queensland
Makenzie Weale	–	Queensland	Queensland	–
