= 2024 North Queensland Cowboys Women season =

Season of rugby league team

- NRLW Rank: 6th
- 2024 record: Wins: 4; draws: 0; losses: 5
- Points scored: For: 137; against: 218

Team information
- CEO: Jeff Reibel
- Coach: Ricky Henry
- Captain: Kirra Dibb Tallisha Harden
- Stadium: Queensland Country Bank Stadium
- Avg. attendance: 1,648
- High attendance: 2,427 (vs. St George Illawarra, Rd 2)

Top scorers
- Tries: Jakiya Whitfeld (6)
- Goals: Kirra Dibb (18)
- Points: Kirra Dibb (41)
← 2023	2025 →

The 2024 North Queensland Cowboys Women season was the 2nd in the club's history. Coached by Ricky Henry and captained by Kirra Dibb and Tallisha Harden, they competed in the NRLW's 2024 Telstra Women's Premiership.

Henry, who was also head coach of the Kiwi Ferns, replaced inaugural coach Ben Jeffries, who moved to the Newcastle Knights.

== Season summary ==
=== Milestones ===
- Round 1: Harata Butler and Jakiya Whitfeld made their debuts for the club.
- Round 2: The club won their first home game.
- Round 2: Ebony Raftstrand-Smith made her NRLW debut.
- Round 2: Lily Peacock scored her first NRLW try.
- Round 2: Jakiya Whitfeld scored her first try for the club.
- Round 3: Lillian Yarrow made her NRLW debut.
- Round 5: The club won back-to-back games for the first time.
- Round 6: Lavinia Tauhalaliku made her NRLW debut.
- Round 7: Lavinia Tauhalaliku scored her first NRLW try.
- Round 8: Jazmon Tupou-Witchman made her debut for the club.

=== Squad ===
North Queensland Cowboys 2024 NRLW squad
NRLW squad – 2024 season			Development players	Coaching staff
Essay Banu – PR; Krystal Blackwell – FB, FE; Harata Butler – PR; Bree Chester – SR, CE; Kirra Dibb – HB, FE; Jetaya Faifua – WG, FB; Fran Goldthorp – FB, WG; Tallisha Harden – PR, LK; Shellie Long – CE, WG	Emma Manzelmann – HK; Sareka Mooka – PR, SR; Vitalina Naikore – WG; Lily Peacock – SR, PR; Jasmine Peters – CE, FB; China Polata – WG, FB; Shaniah Power – SR; Ebony Raftstrand-Smith – WG; Tiana Raftstrand-Smith – PR, SR	Libby Surha – CE; Lavinia Tauhalaliku – WG; Tahlulah Tillett – FE, HB; Jazmon Tupou-Witchman – SR, CE; Makenzie Weale – PR, LK; Jakiya Whitfeld – WG, FB; Lillian Yarrow – PR	Emily Bella – HK, HB; Alisha Foord – FE, HK; Caitlin Tanner – HB; Extended squad: Paityne Johns – HK; Ana Malupo – CE; Latoniya Norris – FB; Elisa Niki – PR; Kayla Shepherd – HB	Head coach: Ricky Henry; Assistant coaches: David Faiumu; Alicia-Kate Hawke; Anita Creenaune (Head of Elite Programs); Daniel Strickland (Head of Performance); Larissa Di Bella (Sports Scientist); Ebony Bray (Team Doctor); Maggie Dwyer (Physiotherapist); Legend: (c) Captain(s); (vc) Vice-captain(s); Updated: 31 May 2024; Source(s): NQ Cowboys

== Squad movement ==
=== Gains ===
Player	Signed from	Until end of	Notes
Harata Butler	Cronulla Sharks	2025	
Caitlin Tanner	Wynnum Manly Seagulls	2024	
Lavinia Tauhalaliku	Manly Sea Eagles (mid-season)	2024	
Jazmon Tupou-Witchman	South Sydney Rabbitohs (mid-season)	2024	
Jakiya Whitfeld	Wests Tigers	2026	

=== Losses ===
Player	Signed to	Until end of	Notes
Shaylee Joseph	Brisbane Broncos	2024	
Sera Koroi	Sunnybank Rugby	2024	
Mia Middleton	Parramatta Eels	2024	
April Ngatupuna	Queensland Reds	2024	
Jessikah Reeves	Western Clydesdales	2024	
Merewalesi Rokouono	Fijiana Drua	2024	
Autumn-Rain Stephens-Daly	Released	–	

== Ladder ==
2024 NRLW season
Pos	Team	Pld	W	D	L	PF	PA	PD	Pts
1	Brisbane Broncos	9	7	0	2	272	156	+116	14
2	Sydney Roosters	9	7	0	2	222	112	+110	14
3	Newcastle Knights	9	6	0	3	238	132	+106	12
4	Cronulla-Sutherland Sharks	9	6	0	3	146	122	+24	12
5	Parramatta Eels	9	5	0	4	160	184	-24	10
6	North Queensland Cowboys	9	4	0	5	137	218	-81	8
7	Canberra Raiders	9	3	0	6	194	216	-22	6
8	Gold Coast Titans	9	3	0	6	128	191	-63	6
9	St George Illawarra Dragons	9	2	0	7	178	234	-56	4
10	Wests Tigers	9	2	0	7	108	218	-110	4

== Fixtures ==
=== Pre-season ===
Date	Round	Opponent	Venue	Score	Tries	Goals	Attendance
Sunday, 14 July	Trial 1	Gold Coast Titans	Alley Park	28 – 12	Peters (2), Blackwell, Goldthorp, T Raftstrand-Smith, Tillett		
Legend: Win Loss Draw Bye

=== Regular season ===
Date	Round	Opponent	Venue	Score	Tries	Goals	Attendance
Saturday, 27 July	Round 1	Cronulla Sharks	PointsBet Stadium	0–14			1,257
Sunday, 4 August	Round 2	St George Illawarra Dragons	Queensland Country Bank Stadium	38–34	T. Raftstrand-Smith (2), Whitfeld (2), Goldthorp, Peacock, Peters	Dibb (5/7)	
Sunday, 11 August	Round 3	Parramatta Eels	Totally Workwear Stadium	6–20	Polata	Dibb (1/1)	1,393
Saturday, 17 August	Round 4	Gold Coast Titans	Queensland Country Bank Stadium	11–10	Goldthorp, Whitfeld	Dibb (1/2, 1 FG)	1,458
Saturday, 24 August	Round 5	Canberra Raiders	GIO Stadium	28–18	Naikore (2), Peters (2), Blackwell, T. Raftstrand-Smith	Dibb (2/6)	4,177
Sunday, 1 September	Round 6	Brisbane Broncos	Totally Workwear Stadium	12–38	T. Raftstrand-Smith, Whitfeld	Dibb	
Saturday, 7 September	Round 7	Wests Tigers	Queensland Country Bank Stadium	24–22	Faifua, Peters, Tauhalaliku, Whitfeld	Dibb (4/4)	1,314
Sunday, 15 September	Round 8	Sydney Roosters	Industree Group Stadium	12–24	Dibb, Whitfeld	Dibb (2/2)	
Saturday, 21 September	Round 9	Newcastle Knights	Queensland Country Bank Stadium	6–38	Chester	Dibb (1/1)	
Legend: Win Loss Draw Bye

== Statistics ==
Name	App	T	G	FG	Pts
Essay Banu	7	–	–	–	–
Krystal Blackwell	8	1	–	–	4
Harata Butler	4	–	–	–	–
Bree Chester	9	1	–	–	4
Kirra Dibb	9	1	18	1	41
Jetaya Faifua	6	1	–	–	4
Alisha Foord	3	–	–	–	–
Fran Goldthorp	8	2	–	–	8
Tallisha Harden	9	–	–	–	–
Shellie Long	3	–	–	–	–
Emma Manzelmann	9	–	–	–	–
Sareka Mooka	6	–	–	–	–
Vitalina Naikore	4	2	–	–	8
Lily Peacock	8	1	–	–	4
Jasmine Peters	9	4	–	–	16
China Polata	6	1	–	–	4
Shaniah Power	5	–	–	–	–
Ebony Raftstrand-Smith	1	–	–	–	–
Tiana Raftstrand-Smith	8	4	–	–	16
Libby Surha	4	–	–	–	–
Lavinia Tauhalaliku	4	1	–	–	4
Tahlulah Tillett	9	–	–	–	–
Jazmon Tupou-Witchman	1	–	–	–	–
Makenzie Weale	2	–	–	–	–
Jakiya Whitfeld	9	6	–	–	24
Lillian Yarrow	3	–	–	–	–
Totals		25	18	1	137

== Representatives ==
The following players played a representative match in 2024.

	All Stars match	State of Origin 1	State of Origin 2	State of Origin 3	Prime Minister's XIII	Pacific Championships
Essay Banu					Papua New Guinea	Papua New Guinea
Krystal Blackwell					Australia	
Bree Chester					Australia	
Kirra Dibb	Indigenous All Stars				Australia	
Jetaya Faifua						Samoa
Tallisha Harden	Indigenous All Stars					
Ana Malupo						Tonga
Emma Manzelmann		Queensland	Queensland	Queensland	Australia	
Sareka Mooka					Papua New Guinea	Papua New Guinea
Vitalina Naikore						Fiji
Lily Peacock					Australia	
Jasmine Peters	Indigenous All Stars					
Tiana Raftstrand-Smith	Maori All Stars					
Lavinia Tauhalaliku						Tonga
Jazmon Tupou-Witchman						Cook Islands
Makenzie Weale		Queensland	Queensland	Queensland		
Jakiya Whitfeld						Australia

== Honours ==
=== Club ===
- Cowboy of the Year: Bree Chester
- Players' Player: Jakiya Whitfeld
- The Cowboys Way Award: Alisha Foord
- Rookie of the Year: Lily Peacock
- Fans Choice Player of the Year: Kirra Dibb
