= 2023 North Queensland Cowboys Women season =

Season of rugby league team

- NRLW Rank: 9th
- 2023 record: Wins: 2; draws: 0; losses: 7
- Points scored: For: 133; against: 266

Team information
- CEO: Jeff Reibel
- Coach: Ben Jeffries
- Captain: Kirra Dibb Tallisha Harden
- Stadium: Queensland Country Bank Stadium
- Avg. attendance: 9,005
- High attendance: 22,659 (vs. Brisbane, Round 3)

Top scorers
- Tries: Emma Manzelmann; Vitalina Naikore; Jasmine Peters (3)
- Goals: Kirra Dibb (18)
- Points: Kirra Dibb (41)
2024 →

The 2023 North Queensland Cowboys Women season was the first in the club's history. Coached by Ben Jeffries and captained by Kirra Dibb and Tallisha Harden, they competed in the NRLW's 2023 Telstra Women's Premiership.

They finished their inaugural season in 9th, missing the finals with just two wins from nine games.

== Season summary ==
=== Milestones ===
- Round 1: The club played their first NRLW game (losing 16–6 to the Gold Coast Titans).
- Round 1: Emma Manzelmann scored the club's first try.
- Round 1: Krystal Blackwell, Bree Chester, Fran Goldthorp, Sera Koroi, Shellie Long, Mia Middleton, Sareka Mooka and Vitalina Naikore made their NRLW debuts.
- Round 2: The club won their first game (def. Newcastle Knights 31-20).
- Round 3: Autumn-Rain Stephens-Daly made her debut for the club.
- Round 3: Shellie Long and April Ngatupuna scored their first NRLW tries.
- Round 4: Essay Banu and Jessikah Reeves made their NRLW debuts.
- Round 4: Tahlulah Tillett made her debut for the club.
- Round 4: China Polata scored her first NRLW try.
- Round 6: Libby Surha made her NRLW debut.
- Round 6: Libby Surha scored her first NRLW try.
- Round 7: Lily Peacock made her NRLW debut.
- Round 7: Krystal Blackwell and Fran Goldthorp scored their first NRLW tries.
- Round 9: Alisha Foord and Merewalesi Rokouono made their NRLW debuts.

=== Squad ===
North Queensland Cowboys 2023 NRLW squad
NRLW Squad – 2023 season			Development players	Coaching staff
Essay Banu – PR; Krystal Blackwell – FB, FE; Bree Chester – SR, CE; Kirra Dibb – HB, FE; Jetaya Faifua – WG, FB; Fran Goldthorp – FB, WG; Tallisha Harden – PR, LK; Shaylee Joseph – PR; Sera Koroi – FE, CE	Shellie Long – CE, WG; Emma Manzelmann – HK; Mia Middleton – CE, WG; Sareka Mooka – PR, SR; Vitalina Naikore – WG; April Ngatupuna – PR; Jasmine Peters – CE, FB; China Polata – WG, FB; Shaniah Power – SR	Tiana Raftstrand-Smith – PR, SR; Jessikah Reeves – PR, LK; Merewalesi Rokouono – HB, FE; Autumn-Rain Stephens-Daly – WG; Tahlulah Tillett – FE, HB; Makenzie Weale – PR, LK	Lily Peacock – PR; Ebony Raftstrand-Smith – WG; Libby Surha – CE; Lillian Yarrow – PR; Extended squad: Alisha Foord – FE	Head coach: Ben Jeffries; Assistant coaches: Alicia-Kate Hawke; Annan Whittington; Anita Creenaune (Head of Elite Programs); Daniel Strickland (Head of Performance); Larissa Di Bella (Sports Scientist); Ebony Bray (Team Doctor); Maggie Dwyer (Physiotherapist); Legend: (c) Captain(s); (vc) Vice-captain(s); Updated: 4 June 2023; Source(s): NQ Cowboys

== Squad movement ==
=== Gains ===
Player	Signed from	Until end of	Notes
Essay Banu	Mackay Cutters	2023	
Krystal Blackwell	Goulburn City Bulldogs	2023	
Bree Chester	Newcastle Knights	2023	
Kirra Dibb	Newcastle Knights	2024	
Jetaya Faifua	Gold Coast Titans	2023	
Fran Goldthorp	Leeds Rhinos	2024	
Tallisha Harden	Brisbane Broncos	2023	
Shaylee Joseph	Central Coast Roosters	2023	
Sera Koroi	Souths Logan Magpies	2023	
Shellie Long	Souths Logan Magpies	2023	
Emma Manzelmann	Newcastle Knights	2023	
Mia Middleton	Newcastle Knights	2023	
Sareka Mooka	Mackay Cutters	2023	
Vitalina Naikore	Fijiana Drua	2025	
April Ngatupuna	Gold Coast Titans	2023	
Lily Peacock	Mackay Cutters	2025	
Jasmine Peters	Mackay Cutters	2025	
China Polata	Mackay Cutters	2023	
Shaniah Power	Sydney Roosters	2024	
Ebony Raftstrand-Smith	Canterbury-Bankstown Bulldogs	2024	
Tiana Raftstrand-Smith	Gold Coast Titans	2024	
Jessikah Reeves	Central Coast Roosters	2023	
Merewalesi Rokouono	Fijiana Drua	2024	
Autumn-Rain Stephens-Daly	Hurricanes Poua	2024	
Libby Surha	Mackay Cutters	2023	
Tahlulah Tillett	Mackay Cutters	2023	
Makenzie Weale	Newcastle Knights	2023	
Lillian Yarrow	Central Queensland Capras	2025	

== Ladder ==
2023 NRLW season
Pos	Team	Pld	W	D	L	PF	PA	PD	Pts
1	Newcastle Knights	9	8	0	1	224	119	+105	16
2	Sydney Roosters	9	7	0	2	284	120	+164	14
3	Gold Coast Titans	9	7	0	2	164	126	+38	14
4	Brisbane Broncos	9	6	0	3	256	165	+91	12
5	Canberra Raiders	9	5	0	4	173	206	-33	10
6	Cronulla-Sutherland Sharks	9	4	0	5	202	150	+52	8
7	St George Illawarra Dragons	9	3	0	6	182	210	-28	6
8	Wests Tigers	9	2	0	7	136	186	-50	4
9	North Queensland Cowboys	9	2	0	7	133	266	-133	4
10	Parramatta Eels	9	1	0	8	104	310	-206	2

Source:NRL

== Fixtures ==
=== Regular season ===
Date	Round	Opponent	Venue	Score	Tries	Goals	Attendance
Saturday, 22 July	Round 1	Gold Coast Titans	Cbus Super Stadium	6 – 16	Manzelmann	Dibb (1/1)	7,926
Sunday, 30 July	Round 2	Newcastle Knights	Belmore Sports Ground	31 – 20	Naikore (2), Chester, Faifua, Mooka, Peters	Dibb (3/7), (1 FG)	1,584
Saturday, 5 August	Round 3	Brisbane Broncos	Queensland Country Bank Stadium	12 – 40	Long, Ngatupuna	Dibb (2/2)	22,659
Saturday, 12 August	Round 4	Wests Tigers	Totally Workwear Stadium	16 – 12	Peters, Polata, Weale	Dibb (2/3)	1,173
Saturday, 19 August	Round 5	Cronulla Sharks	Queensland Country Bank Stadium	12 – 40	Manzelmann, Peters	Dibb (2/2)	1,878
Saturday, 26 August	Round 6	Parramatta Eels	Netstrata Jubilee Stadium	12 – 16	Raftstrand-Smith, Surha	Dibb (2/2)	520
Saturday, 2 September	Round 7	St. George Illawarra Dragons	Queensland Country Bank Stadium	16 – 48	Blackwell, Goldthorp, Naikore	Dibb (2/3)	2,479
Saturday, 10 September	Round 8	Canberra Raiders	Cbus Super Stadium	12 – 34	Manzelmann, Raftstrand-Smith	Dibb (2/2)	1,096
Saturday, 16 September	Round 9	Sydney Roosters	Netstrata Jubilee Stadium	16 – 40	Chester, Dibb, Faifua	Dibb (2/3)	632
Legend: Win Loss Draw Bye

== Statistics ==
Name	App	T	G	FG	Pts
Essay Banu	1	–	–	–	-
Krystal Blackwell	7	1	–	–	4
Bree Chester	8	2	–	–	8
Kirra Dibb	9	1	18	1	41
Jetaya Faifua	5	2	–	–	8
Alisha Foord	1	–	–	–	–
Fran Goldthorp	8	1	–	–	4
Tallisha Harden	9	–	–	–	-
Sera Koroi	8	–	–	–	-
Shellie Long	8	1	–	–	4
Emma Manzelmann	9	3	–	–	12
Mia Middleton	4	–	–	–	-
Sareka Mooka	6	1	–	–	4
Vitalina Naikore	7	3	–	–	12
April Ngatupuna	8	1	–	–	4
Lily Peacock	3	–	–	–	–
Jasmine Peters	9	3	–	–	12
China Polata	8	1	–	–	4
Shaniah Power	5	–	–	–	-
Tiana Raftstrand-Smith	8	2	–	–	8
Jessikah Reeves	5	–	–	–	-
Merewalesi Rokouono	1	–	–	–	–
Autumn-Rain Stephens-Daly	3	–	–	–	-
Libby Surha	1	1	–	–	4
Tahlulah Tillett	6	–	–	–	-
Makenzie Weale	7	1	–	–	4
Totals		24	18	1	133

== Representatives ==
The following players played a representative match in 2023.

	All Stars match	State of Origin 1	State of Origin 2	Prime Minister's XIII	Pacific Championships
Essay Banu	Indigenous All Stars			PNG PM's XIII	Papua New Guinea
Bree Chester	Indigenous All Stars				
Kirra Dibb	Indigenous All Stars				
Tallisha Harden				Aus PM's XIII	
Sera Koroi				PNG PM's XIII	Papua New Guinea
Shellie Long				PNG PM's XIII	Papua New Guinea
Emma Manzelmann		Queensland	Queensland	Aus PM's XIII	Australia
Mia Middleton	Indigenous All Stars				
Sareka Mooka	Indigenous All Stars				Papua New Guinea
Vitalina Naikore					Fiji
China Polata			Queensland	Aus PM's XIII	Tonga
Shaniah Power	Indigenous All Stars	Queensland	Queensland		
Tiana Raftstrand-Smith	Māori All Stars			Aus PM's XIII	
Jessikah Reeves				PNG PM's XIII	Papua New Guinea
Tahlulah Tillett	Indigenous All Stars				

== Honours ==
=== League ===
- RLPA Dream Team: Emma Manzelmann
- Veronica White Medal: Tahlulah Tillett

=== Club ===
- Cowboy of the Year: Emma Manzelmann
- Players' Player: Emma Manzelmann
- The Cowboys Way Award: China Polata
- Rookie of the Year: Fran Goldthorp
- Fans Choice Player of the Year: Kirra Dibb
