= 2025 All Stars match =

Australian rugby league match

The 2025 All Stars match was the fourteenth annual representative exhibition All Stars match of Australian rugby league. The match was played between the Indigenous All Stars and the Māori All Stars at CommBank Stadium on 15 February 2025.

== Men's All Stars match ==
2025 All Stars match
Indigenous All Stars	Māori All Stars
6	10
	1	2	3	4	Total
IND	6	0	0	0	6
MĀO	0	4	4	2	10
- Date: 15 February 2025
- Stadium: CommBank Stadium
- Location: Sydney, New South Wales
- Preston Campbell Medal: Jesse Arthars
- Referee: Todd Smith
- Attendance: 21,328

Broadcast partners
- Broadcasters: Sky Sport Nine Network Fox League

=== Teams ===
The squads were announced on 11 February 2025.

Team details
Indigenous All Stars		Position	Māori All Stars
Name	Number	Position	Number	Name
Hamiso Tabuai-Fidow	1	Fullback	1	Kalyn Ponga
Tyrone Munro	2	Wing	2	William Warbrick
Brian Kelly	3	Centre	3	Dane Gagai (c)
Jack Wighton	4	Centre	4	Mawene Hiroti
Alofiana Khan-Pereira	5	Wing	5	Jesse Arthars
Jayden Campbell	6	Five eighth	6	Charnze Nicoll-Klokstad
Niwhai Puru	7	Half back	17	Zach Dockar-Clay
Shaquai Mitchell (c)	8	Prop forward	8	Royce Hunt
Connor Watson	9	Hooker	9	Jeremy Marshall-King
Josh Kerr (c)	10	Prop forward	10	James Fisher-Harris (c)
Dylan Lucas	11	Second row	11	Jordan Riki
Joshua Curran	12	Second row	12	Jacob Laban
Hohepa Puru	13	Lock forward	13	Leo Thompson
Tallis Duncan	14	Interchange	14	Keano Kini
Brent Naden	15	Interchange	15	Jazz Tevaga
Jayden Sullivan	16	Interchange	16	Xavier Willison
Jacob Alick-Wiencke	17	Interchange	7	Kodi Nikorima
Ethan Roberts	18	Interchange	18	Reuben Porter
Blake Steep	19	Interchange	19	Kurtis Morrin
Jacob Sykes	20	Interchange	20	Jesse McLean
Ronald Griffiths		Coach		Adam Blair

=== Result ===
15 February 2025
19:30 AEDT

Indigenous All Stars	6–10	(Māori people) Māori All Stars
Tries: 1 Mitchell 41'; Goals: 1 Puru 1/1 43'	Report	Tries: 2 Arthars 57'; Laban 67'; Goals: 1 Hiroti 0/1; Nikorima 1/1 68'

CommBank Stadium, Sydney
Attendance: 21,328
Referee: Todd Smith
Touch judges: Dave Munro, Chris Sutton

== Women's All Stars match ==
2025 All Stars match
Indigenous Women's All Stars	Māori Ferns
20	18
	1	2	Total
IND	12	8	20
MĀO	12	6	18
- Date: 15 February 2025
- Stadium: CommBank Stadium
- Location: Sydney, New South Wales
- Trish Hina Medal: Keilee Joseph
- Referee: Karra-Lee Nolan

Broadcast partners
- Broadcasters: Nine Network Fox League

=== Teams ===
The squads were announced on 11 February 2025.

Team details
Indigenous Women's All Stars		Position	Māori Ferns
Name	Number	Position	Number	Name
Jaime Chapman	1	Fullback	1	Shanice Parker
Nakia Davis-Welsh	2	Wing	2	Zali Fay
Bobbi Law	3	Centre	3	Jasmin Strange
Jasmine Peters	4	Centre	4	Annessa Biddle
Monique Donovan	5	Wing	5	Lilly-Ann White
Taliah Fuimaono	6	Five eighth	6	Ashleigh Quinlan
Kirra Dibb	7	Half back	7	Raecene McGregor
Tallisha Harden (c)	8	Prop forward	8	Shannon Mato (c)
Quincy Dodd	9	Hooker	9	Chanté Temara
Keilee Joseph	10	Prop forward	10	Rima Butler
Olivia Kernick	11	Second row	11	Tiana Raftstrand-Smith
Mahalia Murphy	12	Second row	12	Najvada George
Bree Chester	13	Lock forward	13	Kennedy Cherrington
Taneka Todhunter	14	Interchange	14	Rueben Cherrington
Grace Kemp	15	Interchange	15	Harata Butler
Tommaya Kelly-Sines	16	Interchange	16	Laikha Clarke
Essay Banu	17	Interchange	17	Tyla King
Evah McEwen	18	Interchange	18	Kerehitina Matua
Ella Koster	19	Interchange	19	Taneisha Gray
Lailani Montgomery	20	Interchange	20	Pauline Suli-Ruka
Jess Skinner		Coach		Keith Hanley

=== Result ===
15 February 2025
17:50 AEDT

Indigenous Women's All Stars	20 – 18	(Māori people) Māori Ferns
Tries: 3 Donovan 2'; Chapman 9'; Koster 35'; Goals: 3 Dibb 2/4 10', 20'; Montgomery 2/3 53', 59'	Report	Tries: 3 Chanté Temara 13'; Clarke 25'; White 28'; Goals: 3 McGregor 3/3 14', 27', 29'

CommBank Stadium, Sydney
Referee: Karra-Lee Nolan
Trish Hina Medal: Keilee Joseph
