= 2023 All Stars match =

Australian rugby league match

The 2023 All Stars match was the twelfth annual representative exhibition All Stars match of Australian rugby league. The match was played between the Indigenous All Stars and the Māori All Stars at Rotorua International Stadium on 11 February 2023, marking the first occasion the All Stars fixture was played outside of Australia.

== Men's All Stars match ==
2023 All Stars match
Māori All Stars	Indigenous All Stars
24	28
	1	2	3	4	Total
MĀO	6	6	6	6	24
IND	4	6	6	12	28
- Date: 11 February 2023
- Stadium: Rotorua International Stadium
- Location: Rotorua, New Zealand
- Preston Campbell Medal: Nicho Hynes
- Referee: Gerard Sutton
- Attendance: 17,644

Broadcast partners
- Broadcasters: Sky Sport Nine Network Fox League

=== Teams ===
For the Indigenous team, Ronald Griffiths took over as head coach from Laurie Daley, who had held the position since 2011. The initial squads were announced on 25 January 2023, with the final teams confirmed on 7 February 2023.

A number of players withdrew from the original squads:

- Māori All Stars
  - Daejarn Asi
  - Nelson Asofa-Solomona
  - Joseph Manu
  - Starford To'a
  - Jared Waerea-Hargreaves
  - Dylan Walker
  - Dallin Watene-Zelezniak
- Indigenous All Stars
  - Josh Addo-Carr
  - Ezra Mam
  - Chris Smith
  - Will Smith

Team details
Māori All Stars		Position	Indigenous All Stars
Name	Number	Position	Number	Name
Hayze Perham	1	Fullback	1	Latrell Mitchell
Morgan Harper	2	Wing	2	Selwyn Cobbo
Jesse Arthars	3	Centre	3	Jack Wighton
Adam Pompey	4	Centre	4	Brent Naden
Jordan Rapana	5	Wing	5	Tyrell Sloan
Zach Dockar-Clay	6	Five eighth	6	Cody Walker (c)
Paul Turner	7	Half back	7	Nicho Hynes
James Fisher-Harris (c)	8	Prop forward	8	Josh Kerr
Corey Harawira-Naera	9	Hooker	9	Kierran Moseley
Royce Hunt	10	Prop forward	10	Shaquai Mitchell
Briton Nikora	11	Second row	11	Tyrell Fuimaono
Jordan Riki	12	Second row	18	Ryan James
Joseph Tapine (c)	13	Lock forward	13	J'maine Hopgood
Zane Musgrove	14	Interchange	14	Albert Kelly
Leo Thompson	15	Interchange	15	Jamayne Taunoa-Brown
Tukimihia Simpkins	16	Interchange	16	Daine Laurie
Austin Dias	17	Interchange	17	Isaiah Tass
Sheldon Pitama	18	Interchange	12	Tyrone Peachey
Creedence Toia	19	Interchange	19	Braydon Trindall
Preston Riki	20	Interchange	20	Bailey Butler
Ben Gardiner		Coach		Ronald Griffiths

=== Result ===
2023 NRL All Stars Match

11 February 2023
5:50 pm (NZDT UTC+13:00)
3:50 pm (AEDT UTC+11:00)

Māori All Stars (Māori people)	24 – 28	Indigenous All Stars
Tries: 4 Dockar-Clay 3'; Arthars 23'; J. Riki 55'; P. Riki 78'; Goals: 4/4; Rapana 5', 25', 56', 78'	1st: 6–4; 2nd: 6–6; 3rd: 6–6; 4th: 6–12; Report	Tries: 6 Cobbo 62', 69', 73'; Sloan 15'; Hynes 35'; Naden 45'; Goals: 2/4; Hynes 37', 47'; 0/2; L. Mitchell

Rotorua International Stadium, Rotorua
Attendance: 17,644
Referee: Gerard Sutton
Preston Campbell Medal: Nicho Hynes

== Women's All Stars match ==
2023 All Stars match
Māori All Stars	Indigenous All Stars
16	12
	1	2	Total
MĀO	8	8	16
IND	6	6	12
- Date: 11 February 2023
- Stadium: Rotorua International Stadium
- Location: Rotorua, New Zealand
- Trish Hina Medal: Gayle Broughton
- Referee: Rochelle Tamarua
- Attendance: 12,273

Broadcast partners
- Broadcasters: Sky Sport Nine Network Fox League

=== Teams ===
Kennedy Cherrington was a late withdrawal from the Māori All Stars after suffering a hand injury. Caitlan Johnston and Tallisha Harden also withdrew from the Indigenous All Stars squad.

Team details
Māori All Stars		Position	Indigenous All Stars
Name	Number	Position	Number	Name
Gayle Broughton	1	Fullback	1	Jaime Chapman
Jasmin Strange	2	Wing	2	Bobbi Law
Amy Turner	3	Centre	3	Mia Middleton
Shanice Parker	4	Centre	4	Jasmine Peters
Zali Fay	5	Wing	5	Jada Taylor
Zahara Temara (c)	6	Five eighth	6	Kirra Dibb
Ashleigh Quinlan	7	Half back	7	Tahlulah Tillett
Shannon Mato	8	Prop forward	8	Keilee Joseph
Brooke Anderson	9	Hooker	9	Quincy Dodd (c)
Mya Hill-Moana	10	Prop forward	10	Sareka Mooka
Olivia Kernick	12	Second row	11	Kaitlyn Phillips
Kahu Cassidy	18	Second row	12	Shaylee Bent
Destiny Brill	13	Lock forward	13	Shaniah Power
Capri Paekau	14	Interchange	14	Taliah Fuimaono
Harata Butler	15	Interchange	15	Ahlivia Ingram
Laikha Clarke	16	Interchange	16	Shakiah Tungai
Aaliyah Paki	17	Interchange	17	Essay Banu
Tiana Raftstrand-Smith	11	Reserve	18	Bree Chester
Keith Hanley		Coach		Ben Jeffries

=== Result ===
2023 NRL Women's All Stars Match

11 February 2023
3:30 pm (NZDT UTC+13:00)
1:30 pm (AEDT UTC+11:00)

Māori All Stars (Māori people)	16 – 12	Indigenous All Stars
Tries: 4 Fay 6', 55'; Strange 19'; Turner 47'; Goals: 0/4	HT: 8–6; Report	Tries: 2 Taylor 25'; Joseph 39'; Goals: 2/3; Dibb 15', 41'

Rotorua International Stadium, Rotorua
Attendance: 12,273
Referee: Rochelle Tamarua
Touch judges: Paki Parkinson, Viggo Rasmussen
Trish Hina Medal: Gayle Broughton
