= 2024 All Stars match =

Australian rugby league match

The 2024 All Stars match was the thirteenth annual representative exhibition All Stars match of Australian rugby league. The match was played between the Indigenous All Stars and the Māori All Stars at Queensland Country Bank Stadium on 16 February 2024.

== Men's All Stars match ==
2024 All Stars match
Indigenous All Stars	Māori All Stars
22	14
	1	2	3	4	Total
IND	10	6	0	6	22
MĀO	8	0	0	6	14
- Date: 16 February 2024
- Stadium: Queensland Country Bank Stadium
- Location: Townsville, QLD
- Preston Campbell Medal: Braydon Trindall
- Referee: Todd Smith
- Attendance: 15,579

Broadcast partners
- Broadcasters: Nine Network Fox League

=== Teams ===
The teams were finalised on 16 February 2024. Ronald Griffiths retained his position as head coach of the Indigenous All Stars whilst Adam Blair replaced Ben Gardiner as head coach of the Māori All Stars.

INDIGENOUS ALL STARS	Position	MĀORI ALL STARS
Latrell Mitchell (c)	Fullback	Jesse Arthars
Josh Addo-Carr	Wing	Jojo Fifita^{4}
Hamiso Tabuai-Fidow	Centre	Dane Gagai
Kotoni Staggs	Centre	Matthew Timoko
Alofiana Khan-Pereira	Wing	Adam Pompey
Braydon Trindall^{1}	Five-eighth	Kodi Nikorima
Nicho Hynes	Halfback	Jahrome Hughes
Shaquai Mitchell	Prop	Xavier Willison
Kierran Moseley	Hooker	Brandon Smith
Josh Kerr	Prop	Leo Thompson
Adam Elliott	2nd Row	Briton Nikora (c)
Joshua Curran	2nd Row	Kenny Bromwich
J'maine Hopgood	Lock	Joseph Tapine (c)
Bailey Butler	Interchange	Jazz Tevaga
Brian Kelly^{2}	Interchange	Trey Mooney
Hohepa Puru	Interchange	Royce Hunt
Bailey Biondi-Odo	Interchange	Dylan Walker
Zac Fulton^{3}	Interchange	Te Maire Martin
Jordan Grant	Interchange	Jack Howarth
Kyle Laybutt	Interchange	Keenan Palasia^{5}
Ronald Griffiths	Coach	Adam Blair

^{1} - Cody Walker was originally selected to play but withdrew due to injury. Braydon Trindall was moved from the bench to Five-eighth, Walker was replaced by Kyle Laybutt and the captaincy of the Indigenous All Stars was handed to Latrell Mitchell.
^{2} - Isaiah Tass was originally selected to play but withdrew. He was replaced by Brian Kelly.
^{3} - Jacob Alick was originally selected to play but withdrew due to injury. He was replaced by Zac Fulton.
^{4} - Dallin Watene-Zelezniak was originally selected to play but withdrew due to injury. He was replaced by Jojo Fifita.
^{5} - Jacob Gagai was originally selected to play but was withdrawn due to suspension. He was replaced by Keenan Palasia.

=== Result ===
16 February 2024
19:15 AEST

Indigenous All Stars	22–14	(Māori people) Māori All Stars
Tries: 4 Addo-Carr 7', 17'; Tabuai-Fidow 30'; Khan-Pereira 71'; Goals: 3 Hynes 3/4 19', 32', 72'	Report; 1st: 10–8; 2nd: 6–0; 3rd: 0–0; 4th: 6–6	Tries: 2 Tapine 4'; Willison 80'; Goals: 3 Nikorima 2/2 6', 20 pen' Gagai 1/1 80'

Queensland Country Bank Stadium, Townsville
Attendance: 15,579
Referee: Todd Smith
Preston Campbell Medal: Braydon Trindall

== Women's All Stars match ==
2024 All Stars match
Indigenous All Stars	Māori All Stars
26	4
	1	2	3	4	Total
IND	4	12	6	4	26
MĀO	0	0	0	4	4
- Date: 16 February 2024
- Stadium: Queensland Country Bank Stadium
- Location: Townsville, QLD
- Trish Hina Medal: Kirra Dibb

Broadcast partners
- Broadcasters: Nine Network Fox League

=== Teams ===
Indigenous All Stars	Position	Māori All Stars
Tamika Upton	Fullback	Corban Baxter (c)
Monique Donovan	Wing	Zali Fay
Jaime Chapman	Centre	Shanice Parker
Bobbi Law	Centre	Botille Vette-Welsh
Kimberley Hunt	Wing	Jasmin Strange
Taliah Fuimaono	Five-eighth	Raecene McGregor
Kirra Dibb	Halfback	Zahara Temara
Tommaya Kelly-Sines	Prop	Shannon Mato
Quincy Dodd (c)	Hooker	Destiny Brill
Tallisha Harden	Prop	Mya Hill-Moana
Olivia Kernick	2nd Row	Annessa Biddle
Shaylee Bent	2nd Row	Kennedy Cherrington
Keilee Joseph	Lock	Brooke Anderson
Taneka Todhunter	Interchange	Ashleigh Quinlan
Grace Kemp	Interchange	Kerehitina Matua
Janelle Williams	Interchange	Rima Butler
Mahalia Murphy	Interchange	Chanté Temara
Jasmine Peters	Reserve	Tiana Raftstrand-Smith
Jess Skinner	Coach	Keith Hanley

The teams were finalised on 16 February 2024. Jess Skinner replaced Ben Jeffries as head coach of the Indigenous All Stars, whilst Keith Hanley retained his role as head coach of the Māori All Stars for a fourth consecutive campaign.

=== Result ===
16 February 2024
17:50 AEDT

Indigenous All Stars	26–4	(Māori people) Māori All Stars
Tries: 5 Bent 14'; Chapman 17', 32'; Hunt 24', 56'; Goals: 3 Dibb 3/5 19', 24', 33'	Report; 1st: 4–0; 2nd: 12–0; 3rd: 6–0; 4th: 4–4	Tries: 1 Strange 48'; Goals: 0 McGregor 0/1

Queensland Country Bank Stadium, Townsville
Referee: Liam Kennedy
Trish Hina Medal: Kirra Dibb
