= Indigenous Australian women's rugby league team =

Rugby League Team

Indigenous All Stars
Team information
- Governing body: Australian Rugby League Commission
- Head coach: Jess Skinner
- Captain: Quincy Dodd
- Most caps: Rebecca Young (8); Tallisha Harden (8)
- Top try-scorer: Jaime Chapman (5)
- Top point-scorer: Kirra Dibb (20); Jaime Chapman (20)

Team results
- First international
- Indigenous All Stars Women 6-20 NRL All Stars Women, 2011
- Biggest win
- Indigenous All Stars Women 14-4 NRL All Stars Women, 2017; Indigenous All Stars Women 18-8 Māori All Stars Women, 2022
- Biggest defeat
- Indigenous All Stars Women 6-38 NRL All Stars Women, 2013

The Indigenous Australian women's rugby league team (also known as the Indigenous Women's All Stars) is a rugby league football team that represents Aboriginal Australians and Torres Strait Islanders. The team was first formed in late 2010 for their first match in February 2011. The team currently plays in an annual All Stars Match against a National Rugby League Māori All Stars women's team.

== Coaches ==
Missing matches are 2012 and 2015.

Name	Span	M	W	D	L	W%	Ref.
Name	Rob Brough	2011	1	0	0	1	0.00%
Dennis Moran	2013	1	0	0	1	0.00%	
Ken Nagas	2014	1	0	0	1	0.00%	
Dean Widders	2016-2019	3	1	0	2	33.33%	
Ben Jeffries	2020, 2022-2023	3	2	0	1	66.67%	
Ian Bourke	2021	1	0	0	1	0.00%	
Jess Skinner	2024-2026	3	3	0	0	100.00%	

== Current squad ==
The following players were selected to play in the 15 February 2026 match against the Māori All Stars.
All twenty players spent time on the field during the game.
Players' ages are as at the date that the table was last updated, 16 February 2026.

J#	Player	Age	Position(s)	Indigenous All Stars						NRLW							Other Reps
J#	Player	Age	Position(s)	Dbt	M	T	G	F	Pts	2026 Club	CM	TM	T	G	F	Pts	Other Reps
1	Jada Taylor	22	Fullback	2023	2	2	0	0	8	Sharks	14	15	6	0	0	24	1
2	Krystal Blackwell	23	Wing	2026	1	1	0	0	4	Raiders	0	27	7	0	0	28	1
3	Jaime Chapman	23	Centre	2021	6	5	0	0	20	Titans	22	36	21	0	0	84	5 8 1 3
4	Jasmine Peters	23	Centre	2021	6	0	0	0	0	Cowboys	30	38	16	0	0	64	3 1
5	Phoenix-Raine Hippi	19	Wing	2026	1	1	0	0	4	Titans	7	7	9	0	0	36	1
6	Taliah Fuimaono	26	Five-eighth	2021	6	0	0	0	0	Dragons	0	29	4	0	0	16	3 1 5
7	Kirra Dibb	28	Halfback	2022	5	0	12	0	24	Knights	12	45	6	85	2	196	1 2 5 3
8	Caitlan Johnston-Green	25	Prop	2019	5	0	0	0	0	Sharks	3	26	4	0	0	16	4 4 2 1
9	Quincy Dodd	25	Hooker	2019	8	0	0	0	0	Sharks	27	45	13	0	0	52	2 5 7 4
10	Keilee Joseph	24	Prop	2021	6	1	0	0	4	Eels	0	45	4	0	0	16	6 6
11	Shaylee Bent	25	Second-row	2019	7	1	0	0	4	Titans	32	51	5	0	0	20	4 4 4 2
12	Tallisha Harden	33	Second-row	2014	9	0	0	0	0	Cowboys	29	47	2	0	0	8	4 5 2
13	Bree Chester	23	Lock	2022	3	0	0	0	0	Cowboys	29	29	4	0	0	16	2
14	Lailani Montgomery	21	Fullback, Five-eighth	2025	2	0	2	0	4	Titans	15	15	0	0	0	0	—
15	Mahalia Murphy	32	Second-row, Centre	2011	6	0	0	0	0	Eels	26	29	9	0	0	36	3 1 1
16	Essay Banu	23	Second-row, Prop	2023	3	0	0	0	0	Cowboys	20	20	0	0	0	0	1 3 4
17	Grace Kemp	24	Prop, Lock	2024	3	0	0	0	0	Raiders	26	26	3	0	0	12	3 1
18	Rhiannon Byers	26	Second-row, Centre	2026	1	0	0	0	0	Sharks	18	18	3	0	0	12	—
19	Ella Koster	20	Second-row, Lock	2025	2	1	0	0	4	Dragons	0	24	6	0	0	24	1
20	Caitlin Turnbull	25	Fullback, Wing	2026	1	1	0	0	4	Tigers	10	10	8	0	0	32	1

== Results ==
Date	Opponent	Score	Tournament	Venue	Video	Ref.
12 Feb 2011	Women's All Stars	6–20	All Stars match	Skilled Park, Gold Coast	—	
13 Feb 2012	Women's All Stars	10–10	All Stars match	Suncorp Stadium, Brisbane	—	
9 Feb 2013	Women's All Stars	6–38	All Stars match	Suncorp Stadium, Brisbane	—	
2 May 2014	Women's All Stars	0–24	All Stars match	Sydney Football Stadium, Sydney	—	
12 Feb 2015	Women's All Stars	8–26	All Stars match	Cbus Super Stadium, Gold Coast	—	
13 Feb 2016	Women's All Stars	4–24	All Stars match	Suncorp Stadium, Brisbane	—	
10 Feb 2017	Women's All Stars	14–4	All Stars match	McDonald Jones Stadium, Newcastle		
15 Feb 2019	Māori Women's All Stars	4–8	All Stars match	AAMI Park, Melbourne		
22 Feb 2020	Māori Women's All Stars	10–4	All Stars match	Cbus Super Stadium, Gold Coast		
20 Feb 2021	Māori Women's All Stars	0–24	All Stars match	Queensland Country Bank Stadium		
12 Feb 2022	Māori Women's All Stars	18–8	All Stars match	CommBank Stadium		
11 Feb 2023	Māori Women's All Stars	12–16	All Stars match	Rotorua International Stadium		
16 Feb 2024	Māori Women's All Stars	26–4	All Stars match	Queensland Country Bank Stadium		
15 Feb 2025	Māori Women's All Stars	20–18	All Stars match	CommBank Stadium		
15 Feb 2026	Māori Women's All Stars	20–14	All Stars match	Waikato Stadium		

== See also ==
- List of Indigenous All Stars players
