= Sian Williams (rugby league) =

Australian rugby league footballer

Personal information
- Full name: Sian Williams
- Born: 31 December 2003 (age 22) Townsville, Queensland, Australia
- Height: 171 cm (5 ft 7 in)
- Weight: 70 kg (11 st 0 lb)

Playing information
- Position: Wing
Club
Years	Team	Pld	T	G	FG	P
2026–	Nth Qld Cowboys	3	0	0	0	0
Representative
Years	Team	Pld	T	G	FG	P
2026–	Wales	3	0	0	0	0
- Source: As of 8 November 2026

Sian Williams (born 31 December 2003) is an Australian professional rugby league footballer who currently plays for the North Queensland Cowboys in the NRL Women's Premiership.

== Background ==
Williams was born and raised in Townsville, where she attended William Ross State High School.

== Playing career ==
=== Early years ===
From 2022 to 2024, Williams played for the Western Lions in the Townsville District Rugby League Women's competition.

In 2025, Williams joined the Northern Pride in the QRL Women's Premiership, finishing the season as their joint Player of the Year. On 10 December 2025, Williams signed a two-year contract with the North Queensland Cowboys.

=== 2026 ===
In Round 1 of the 2026 NRL Women's season, Williams made her debut in the Cowboys' loss to the Brisbane Broncos.

She made her Wales international début in the 2026 Rugby League World Cup 70-6 loss to England on 17 October 2026.
