= Tayla Curtis =

Australian rugby league footballer

Personal information
- Full name: Tayla Curtis
- Born: 4 August 2003 (age 23) North Epping, New South Wales, Australia
- Height: 175 cm (5 ft 9 in)
- Weight: 78 kg (12 st 4 lb)

Playing information
- Position: Second-row, Lock
Club
Years	Team	Pld	T	G	FG	P
2026–	Nth Qld Cowboys	7	0	0	0	0
- Source: As of 1 November 2026

Tayla Curtis (born 4 August 2003) is an Australian professional rugby league footballer who currently plays for the North Queensland Cowboys in the NRL Women's Premiership.

== Background ==
Curtis was born in North Epping, New South Wales and raised in Redcliffe, Queensland. She played her junior rugby league for the Parkwood Sharks and attended Mabel Park State High School.

== Playing career ==
=== Early years ===
In 2021, Curtis moved to Sydney to play for the Cronulla-Sutherland Sharks in the Tarsha Gale Cup. In 2022, she played for the side again before moving up to their NSWRL Women's Premiership team.

In 2023, Curtis joined the St George Illawarra Dragons NRLW squad, leaving at the end of the 2024 season without playing a game.

In 2025, Curtis joined the North Queensland Cowboys as a development player, spending the season playing for the Northern Pride in the QRL Women's Premiership. On 10 December 2025, she re-signed with the Cowboys on a two-year contract.

=== 2026 ===
In Round 1 of the 2026 NRL Women's season, Curtis made her NRLW debut in the Cowboys' loss to the Brisbane Broncos.
