= Tallara Bamblett =

Australian rugby league footballer (born 2004)

Personal information
- Full name: Tallara Bamblett
- Born: 5 August 2004 (age 22) Sydney, New South Wales, Australia
- Height: 165 cm (5 ft 5 in)
- Weight: 70 kg (11 st 0 lb)

Playing information
- Position: Fullback
Club
| Years | Team | Pld | T | G | FG | P |
|---|---|---|---|---|---|---|
| 2026– | Nth Qld Cowboys | 6 | 0 | 0 | 0 | 0 |
- Source: As of 1 November 2026

Tallara Bamblett (born 5 August 2004) is an Australian professional rugby league footballer who currently plays for the North Queensland Cowboys in the NRL Women's Premiership.

== Background ==
Bamblett was born in Sydney and is of Indigenous descent. She played her junior rugby league for the All Saints Toongabbie Tigers and attended The Hills Sports High School, where she represented the Australian Schoolgirls rugby league team in 2022.

== Playing career ==
=== Early years ===
In 2022 and 2023, Bamblett played for the Parramatta Eels in the Tarsha Gale Cup. In 2024, she played for their NSWRL Women's Premiership side.

In 2025, she signed with the Wests Tigers NRLW side as a development player.

=== 2026 ===
In 2026, Bamblett joined the North Queensland Cowboys.

In Round 1 of the 2026 NRL Women's season, Bamblett made her debut at fullback in the Cowboys' loss to the Brisbane Broncos.
