= North Queensland Cowboys Women =

Australian rugby league football club

North Queensland Cowboys

Club information
- Full name: North Queensland Cowboys Rugby League Football Club
- Nickname: Cowboys
- Short name: NQL
- Colours: Navy Blue; Grey; Gold
- Founded: 15 June 2022; 4 years ago
- Website: cowboys.com.au

Current details
- Ground: North Queensland Stadium (25,000)
- CEO: Jeff Reibel
- Chairman: Lewis Ramsay
- Coach: Ricky Henry
- Captain: Emma Manzelmann
- Competition: NRL Women's Premiership
- 2024 season: 4th
- Current season

Records
- Biggest win: Cowboys 42 – 14 Dragons; WIN Stadium (6 Sep 2025)
- Biggest loss: Cowboys 6 – 56 Roosters; Queensland Country Bank Stadium (13 Sep 2025)
- First game: Cowboys 6 – 16 Titans; Cbus Super Stadium (22 Jul 2023)
- Most capped: 40 – Jasmine Peters & Bree Chester
- Highest try scorer: 14 – Jasmine Peters
- Highest points scorer: 134 – Kirra Dibb

The North Queensland Cowboys Women is an Australian professional rugby league football club based in Townsville, the largest city in North Queensland. They compete in Australia's premier women's rugby league competition, the NRL Women's Premiership (NRLW).

== History ==
In April 2019, the North Queensland Cowboys announced a program to support grassroots women's rugby league in the region with the hope of gaining entry into the NRL Women's Premiership. The program featured sponsorship and support for that year's Queensland Rugby League (QRL) Northern Region Women's Championship, as well as sponsorship of the Townsville, Cairns and Mackay women's rugby league competitions. Prior to 2019, the Cowboys hosted the 2015 Women's Interstate Challenge between Queensland and New South Wales at their home venue, Willows Sports Complex, as a curtain raiser to their Round 16 NRL fixture against the Cronulla-Sutherland Sharks. Several Jillaroos and Queensland representatives grew up or spent time playing in the North Queensland region, including Brittany Breayley-Nati, Renae Kunst (Mackay), Heather Ballinger, Steph Mooka and Jenni-Sue Hoepper (Cairns).

On 10 September 2019, the club announced the opening of their Women's Academy, providing a pathway to elite rugby league for females in north Queensland. The first four Academy members announced were Romy Teitzel, Riutoto Te Hiko, Shanaye Watson and Jasmine Peters. Teiztel's father, Craig, played 12 games for the Cowboys in 1995.

On 17 December 2019, the Cowboys announced their first women's team, the North Queensland Gold Stars, who competed in the QRL Women's Premiership. The Gold Stars were a collaborative effort between the Cowboys and their three feeder clubs, the Mackay Cutters, Northern Pride and Townsville Blackhawks. On 14 March 2020, the Gold Stars successfully played their first game, defeating Brothers Ipswich 24–10 at Blue Ribbon Motors Field in Ipswich. Emma Manzelmann and Jasmine Peters, who would be the club's first two NRLW signings in 2023, played in the match. The season was cancelled two weeks later due to the COVID-19 pandemic.

On 17 October 2020, Teitzel became the first Academy graduate to play in the NRLW when she debuted for the Brisbane Broncos. On 13 November 2020, Shaniah Power became the first Academy graduate to represent Queensland.

On 15 March 2022, the Cowboys formally applied to enter the NRLW. On 4 June 2022, the Gold Stars won the QRL Women's Premiership Grand Final, defeating the Central Queensland Capras 14–12, with the side featuring six of the Cowboys' future NRLW squad members.

On 15 June 2022, the Cowboys were admitted to the NRLW for the 2023 season. Following the announcement, the Gold Stars folded and were replaced in the QRL Women's Premiership by a Mackay Cutters women's side.

On 24 November 2022, Ben Jeffries was announced as the club's inaugural NRLW head coach, with Anita Creenaune appointed as Head of Women's Elite Programs. On 4 April 2023, Mackay's Emma Manzelmann became the club's inaugural signing.

== Seasons ==
Season	Regular season								Finals		Ref
Season	P	W	D	L	F	A	Pts	Pos	Top	Placing	Ref
2023	9	2	0	7	133	266	4	9th	4	—	
2024	9	4	0	5	137	218	8	6th	4	—	
2025	11	7	0	4	186	176	14	4th	6	Semi Finalist	
2026	11	3	0	8	178	375	6	10th	6	—	

=== 2026 draw ===
The draw for the 2026 season was announced on 14 November 2025.

Round	Opponent	Score	Date	Time	Venue	
1	Broncos	4–50	Sat 4 Jul 2026	5:15 PM	Away	Suncorp Stadium
2	Tigers	18–30	Sat 11 Jul 2026	12:45 PM	Home	Queensland Country Bank Stadium
3	Warriors	4–42	Sat 18 Jul 2026	3:15 PM	Away	Go Media Stadium
4	Titans	6–34	Sat 25 Jul 2026	5:15 PM	Home	Queensland Country Bank Stadium
5	Raiders	18–16	Sat 1 Aug 2026	4:15 PM	Neutral	Geohex Stadium, Wagga Wagga
6	Bulldogs	26–28	Sat 8 Aug 2026	12:45 PM	Away	Belmore Sports Ground
7	Sharks	30–18	Sun 16 Aug 2026	6:15 PM	Home	Queensland Country Bank Stadium
8	Dragons	32–28	Sat 22 Aug 2026	5:15 PM	Away	Allianz Stadium
9	Knights	6–40	Sat 29 Aug 2026	5:15 PM	Home	Queensland Country Bank Stadium
10	Roosters	6–56	Sat 5 Sep 2026	3:15 PM	Home	Queensland Country Bank Stadium
11	Eels	28–33	Sat 12 Sep 2026	12:00 PM	Away	CommBank Stadium

== Head-to-head records ==
Opponent	First meeting	P	W	D	L	PF	PA	Win %	Share %
Titans	22 Jul 2023	4	2	0	2	43	66	50.00%	39.45%
Knights	30 Jul 2023	4	1	0	3	49	124	25.00%	28.32%
Broncos	5 Aug 2023	4	0	0	4	32	178	0.00%	15.24%
Tigers	12 Aug 2023	4	3	0	1	88	72	75.00%	55.00%
Sharks	19 Aug 2023	5	2	0	3	76	110	40.00%	40.86%
Eels	26 Aug 2023	4	1	0	3	60	79	25.00%	43.17%
Dragons	2 Sep 2023	4	3	0	1	128	124	75.00%	50.79%
Raiders	10 Sep 2023	4	3	0	1	84	68	75.00%	55.26%
Roosters	16 Sep 2023	4	0	0	4	34	150	0.00%	18.48%
Warriors	3 Aug 2025	2	0	0	2	10	54	0.00%	15.63%
Bulldogs	17 Aug 2025	2	1	0	1	48	34	50.00%	58.54%
Totals	22 Jul 2023	41	16	0	25	652	1059	39.02%	38.11%

Notes

- Share % is the percentage of points For over the sum of points For and Against.
- Clubs listed in the order than the Cowboys Women first played them.
- As of 15 September 2026

== Coaches ==
As of 21 September 2026

Coach	Tenure	M	W	D	L	For	Agst	Win %	Share %	Ref
Ben Jeffries	2023	9	2	0	7	133	266	22.22%	33.33%	
Ricky Henry	2024–present	32	14	0	18	519	793	43.75%	39.56%	

== Captains ==
All players that have captained the North Queensland Cowboys Women's team in NRLW matches.
As of 21 September 2026

C#	Name	Years as Captain	Debut		Games as Captain			Games for Club	Ref
C#	Name	Years as Captain	Date	Round	Solo	Joint	Total	Games for Club	Ref
1	Kirra Dibb	2023–2025	22 Jul 2023	1	0	27	27	27	
1	Tallisha Harden	2023–2024	22 Jul 2023	1	0	18	18	37	
3	Emma Manzelmann	2025–present	5 Jul 2025	1	9	9	18	36	
4	Bree Chester	2026	16 Aug 2026	7	5	0	5	40	

== Players ==
=== 2026 NRLW squad ===
North Queensland Cowboys 2026 NRLW squad
NRLW squad – 2026 season			Supplementary list	Coaching staff
Tafao Asaua – PR; Tallara Bamblett – HB; Essay Banu – PR; Bree Chester – LK; Tayla Curtis – SR; Lily Dick – SR; Alisha Foord – PR; Fran Goldthorp – FB; Tallisha Harden – PR	Haylee Hifo – WG; Rosie Kelly – FE; Jennifer Kimber – FB; Ana Malupo – WG; Emma Manzelmann (c) – HK; Ashley Marsters – PR; Hailee-Jay Ormond-Maunsell – SR; Lily Peacock – PR; Jasmine Peters – CE	Ebony Raftstrand-Smith – WG; Tiana Raftstrand-Smith – SR; Abigail Roache – CE; Lydia Turua-Quedley – HB; Emily Veivers – HK; Margot Vella – WG; Makenzie Weale – PR; Jakiya Whitfeld – FB; Sian Williams – WG	Charlize Lloyd-Phillips – WG; Lyrech Mara – PR; Development list: Jakaia-Lee Collett – SR; Ella Cronin – PR; Kayla Jackson – WG; Nadia Windleborn – HK	Head coach: Ricky Henry; Assistant coaches: David Faiumu; Ty Williams; Anita Creenaune (head of elite programs); Daniel Strickland (head of performance); Larissa Di Bella (sports scientist); Legend: (c) Captain(s); (vc) Vice-captain(s); Updated: 14 June 2026; Source(s): NQ Cowboys

=== Players in ===
- Zali Hopkins from Dragons
- Sara Sautia from Dragons
- Amanda Misa from Broncos
- Ashleigh Quinlan from Bulldogs

=== Players extended ===
- Fran Goldthorp (2028)
- Lily Peacock (2028)
- Abigail Roache (2028)

=== Players out ===
- Rosie Kelly to Bulldogs
- Mackenzie Weale to Dragons

Retired

- Tallisha Harden

Released

- Tallara Bamblett (Rpl) (6)
- Ella Cronin (Dev) (0)
- Lily Dick (8)
- Haylee Hifo (Rpl) (2)
- Jennifer Kimber (0)
- Lyrech Mara (Sup) (1)
- Ebony Raftstrand-Smith (0)
- Tiana Raftstrand-Smith (7)
- Emily Veivers (2)
- Sian Williams (3)
- Nadia Windleborn (Dev) (5)

Off contract

- Tafao Asaua (5)
- Alisha Foord (8)
- Hailee-Jay Ormond-Maunsell (7)
- Kayla Jackson (Dev) (3)
- Charlize Lloyd-Phillips (Sup) (7)
- Margot Vella (Rpl) (11)

==== Off contract after 2027 ====
- Tayla Curtis
- Ashley Marsters
- Jasmine Peters
- Lydia Turua-Quedley

== Individual awards ==
The North Queensland Cowboys player of the year and other club award winners since 2023.

Year	Player of the Year	Player's Player	Townsville Bulletin Fans' Choice Player of the Year	Member's Award	Cowboys Way Award (Coach's Award)	Rookie of the Year	Ref
2023	Emma Manzelmann	Emma Manzelmann	Kirra Dibb	—	China Polata	Fran Goldthorp	
2024	Bree Chester	Jakiya Whitfeld	Jakiya Whitfeld	—	Alisha Foord	Lily Peacock	
2025	Bree Chester	Fran Goldthorp	Emma Manzelmann	Emma Manzelmann	Abigail Roache	Ana Malupo	
2026	Fran Goldthorp	Mackenzie Weale	Essay Banu	Fran Goldthorp	Lily Peacock	Charlize Lloyd-Phillips	

== Club records ==
Win-loss record since entering the NRLW in 2023.

Games	Wins	Drawn	Loss	Points for	Points against	+/-	Win %
41	16	0	25	652	1,059	–407	39.02%

=== Individual records ===
Lists and tables last updated: 21 September 2026.

==== Career records (at the Cowboys) ====
===== Most games for the Cowboys =====
Qualification: 20 games

Rank	Player	Span	Games
1	Jasmine Peters	2023–present	40
1	Bree Chester	2023–present	40
3	Francesca Goldthorp	2023–present	39
4	Tallisha Harden	2023–present	38
5	Emma Manzelmann	2023–present	36
6	Makenzie Weale	2023–present	31
7	Essay Banu	2023–present	30
8	Kirra Dibb	2023–2025	27
8	Tiana Raftstrand-Smith	2023–present	27
8	Krystal Blackwell	2023–2025	27
11	Alisha Foord	2023–present	24
12	Lily Peacock	2023–present	23
12	Tahlulah Tillett	2023–2025	23

===== Most points for the Cowboys =====
Qualification: 20 points

Rank	Player	2026 club	M	T	G	FG	Points
1	Kirra Dibb		27	4	58	2	134
2	Jasmine Peters		40	14	0	0	56
3	Francesca Goldthorp		39	13	0	0	52
4	Rosie Kelly		18	2	21	0	50
5	Emma Manzelmann		36	7	6	0	40
5	Jakiya Whitfeld	—	18	10	0	0	40
7	Tiana Raftstrand-Smith		27	8	0	0	32
8	Krystal Blackwell		27	7	0	0	28
9	Makenzie Weale		31	6	0	0	24
10	Bree Chester		40	5	0	0	20
10	Vitalina Naikore	—	11	5	0	0	20
10	Margot Vella		11	5	0	0	20
10	Charlize Lloyd-Phillips		7	5	0	0	20

===== Most tries for the Cowboys =====
Qualification: 5 tries

Rank	Player	Tries
1	Jasmine Peters	14
2	Francesca Goldthorp	13
3	Jakiya Whitfeld	10
4	Tiana Raftstrand-Smith	8
5	Emma Manzelmann	7
5	Krystal Blackwell	7
7	Makenzie Weale	6
8	Bree Chester	5
8	Vitalina Naikore	5
8	Margot Vella	5
8	Charlize Lloyd-Phillips	5

===== Most goals for the Cowboys =====
All goal kickers

Rank	Player	Goals
1	Kirra Dibb	58
2	Rosie Kelly	21
3	Emma Manzelmann	6

===== Most field goals for the Cowboys =====
Two instances by one player to date

Rank	Player	Field goals
1	Kirra Dibb	2

==== Season records ====
===== Most points in a season for the Cowboys =====
Qualification: 20 points

Rank	Player	Season	M	T	G	FG	Points
1	Kirra Dibb	2025	9	2	22	0	52
2	Rosie Kelly	2026	11	1	19	0	42
3	Kirra Dibb	2023	9	1	18	1	41
3	Kirra Dibb	2024	9	1	18	1	41
5	Jakiya Whitfeld	2024	9	6	0	0	24
5	Francesca Goldthorp	2025	12	6	0	0	24
7	Krystal Blackwell	2025	12	5	0	0	20
7	Jasmine Peters	2025	12	5	0	0	20
7	Emma Manzelmann	2025	12	3	4	0	20
7	Margot Vella	2026	11	5	0	0	20
7	Charlize Lloyd-Phillips	2026	7	5	0	0	20

===== Most tries in a season for the Cowboys =====
Qualification: 4 tries

Rank	Player	Season	M	Tries
1	Jakiya Whitfeld	2024	9	6
1	Francesca Goldthorp	2025	12	6
3	Krystal Blackwell	2025	12	5
3	Jasmine Peters	2025	12	5
3	Margot Vella	2026	11	5
3	Charlize Lloyd-Phillips	2026	7	5
7	Jasmine Peters	2024	9	4
7	Tiana Raftstrand-Smith	2024	8	4
7	Jakiya Whitfeld	2025	9	4
7	Francesca Goldthorp	2026	11	4

==== Match records ====
===== Most points in a game for the Cowboys =====
Qualification: 10 points

Rank	Player	Date	Opponent	Venue	T	G	FG	Points
1	Kirra Dibb	24 Aug 2025	Tigers	Leichhardt Oval	1	5	0	14
1	Kirra Dibb	6 Sep 2025	Dragons	WIN Stadium	0	7	0	14
3	Charlize Lloyd-Phillips	22 Aug 2026	Dragons	Allianz Stadium	3	0	0	12
4	Kirra Dibb	4 Aug 2024	Dragons	Queensland Country Bank Stadium	0	5	0	10
4	Kirra Dibb	20 Sep 2025	Sharks	Queensland Country Bank Stadium	1	3	0	10

===== Most tries in a game for the Cowboys =====
Qualification: 2 tries

Rank	Player	Date	Opponent	Venue	Tries
1	Charlize Lloyd-Phillips	22 Aug 2026	Dragons	Allianz Stadium	3
2	Vitalina Naikore	30 Jul 2023	Knights	Belmore Sports Ground	2
2	Tiana Raftstrand-Smith	4 Aug 2024	Dragons	Queensland Country Bank Stadium	2
2	Jakiya Whitfeld	4 Aug 2024	Dragons	Queensland Country Bank Stadium	2
2	Vitalina Naikore	24 Aug 2024	Raiders	GIO Stadium	2
2	Jasmine Peters	24 Aug 2024	Raiders	GIO Stadium	2
2	Krystal Blackwell	26 Jul 2025	Raiders	Queensland Country Bank Stadium	2
2	Abigail Roache	26 Jul 2025	Raiders	Queensland Country Bank Stadium	2
2	Fran Goldthorp	10 Aug 2025	Eels	CommBank Stadium	2
2	Fran Goldthorp	6 Sep 2025	Dragons	WIN Stadium	2
2	Fran Goldthorp	11 Jul 2026	Tigers	Queensland Country Bank Stadium	2
2	Margot Vella	1 Aug 2026	Raiders	Geohex Park, Wagga Wagga	2
2	Tiana Raftstrand-Smith	8 Aug 2026	Bulldogs	Belmore Sports Ground	2
2	Makenzie Weale	16 Aug 2026	Sharks	Queensland Country Bank Stadium	2
2	Essay Banu	22 Aug 2026	Dragons	Allianz Stadium	2

===== Most goals in a game for the Cowboys =====
Qualification: 4 goals

Rank	Player	Date	Opponent	Venue	Goals
1	Kirra Dibb	6 Sep 2025	Dragons	WIN Stadium	7
2	Kirra Dibb	4 Aug 2024	Dragons	Queensland Country Bank Stadium	5
2	Kirra Dibb	24 Aug 2025	Tigers	Leichhardt Oval	5
4	Kirra Dibb	7 Sep 2024	Tigers	Queensland Country Bank Stadium	4
4	Kirra Dibb	17 Aug 2025	Bulldogs	Queensland Country Bank Stadium	4
4	Rosie Kelly	22 Aug 2026	Dragons	Allianz Stadium	4
4	Rosie Kelly	12 Sep 2026	Eels	CommBank Stadium	4

==== Oldest and youngest players ====
The oldest and youngest players to represent the North Queensland Cowboys women's team in the NRLW.

Name	Age	Year
Tallisha Harden	32 and 62 days	2024
Lily Peacock	18 and 54 days	2023

==== First try and last try ====
Player who scored the first try and most recent try for the Cowboys.

Name	Year	Round	Minute	Opponent
Emma Manzelmann	2023	1	6'	Titans
Nadia Windleborn	2026	11	57'	Eels

=== Margins and streaks ===
Biggest winning margin
Qualification: 10 point margin

Margin	Score	Opponent	Venue	Date	Round
28	42-14	Dragons	WIN Stadium	6 Sep 2025	10
26	26-0	Raiders	Queensland Country Bank Stadium	26 Jul 2025	4
22	30-8	Wests Tigers	Leichhardt Oval	24 Aug 2025	8
16	22-6	Bulldogs	Queensland Country Bank Stadium	17 Aug 2025	7
14	20-6	Titans	Queensland Country Bank Stadium	5 Jul 2025	1
11	31-20	Knights	Belmore Sports Ground	30 Jul 2023	2
10	28-18	Raiders	GIO Stadium	24 Aug 2024	5

Biggest losing margin
Qualification: 20 point margin

Margin	Score	Opponent	Venue	Date	Round
50	6–56	Roosters	Queensland Country Bank Stadium	5 Sep 2026	10
46	4–50	Broncos	Totally Workwear Stadium	13 Sep 2025	11
46	4–50	Broncos	Suncorp Stadium	4 Jul 2026	1
38	4-42	Warriors	Go Media Stadium	18 Jul 2026	3
34	6-40	Knights	Queensland Country Bank Stadium	29 Aug 2026	9
32	16-48	Dragons	Queensland Country Bank Stadium	2 Sep 2023	7
32	6-38	Knights	Queensland Country Bank Stadium	21 Sep 2024	9
30	0-30	Roosters	Queensland Country Bank Stadium	30 Aug 2025	9
28	12-40	Broncos	Queensland Country Bank Stadium	5 Aug 2023	3
28	12-40	Sharks	Queensland Country Bank Stadium	19 Aug 2023	5
28	6-34	Titans	Queensland Country Bank Stadium	25 Jul 2026	4
26	12-38	Broncos	Totally Workwear Stadium	1 Sep 2024	6
24	16-40	Roosters	Netstrata Jubilee Stadium	16 Sep 2023	9
22	12-34	Raiders	Cbus Super Stadium	10 Sep 2023	8
20	6-26	Knights	Queensland Country Bank Stadium	12 Jul 2025	2

Most consecutive wins

- 3 (10 August 2025 – 24 August 2025)

Most consecutive losses

- 6 (19 August 2023 – 27 July 2024)
- 6 (13 September 2025 – 20 September 2025, and 4 July 2026 – 25 July 2026)

Biggest comeback

- Recovered from 16 point deficit to win. Trailed Canberra Raiders 0-16 after 47 minutes at Geohex Park, Wagga Wagga on August 1, 2026 and won 18-16.

Worst collapse

- Surrendered 16 point lead. Led Parramatta Eels 22-6 after 42 minutes at CommBank Stadium on September 12, 2026 and lost 28-33.

== Inaugural team ==
First game and first win

Result	Score	Opponent	Venue	Date	Round	Ref
Lost	6–16	Gold Coast Titans	Cbus Super Stadium	22 Jul 2023	1	
Won	31–20	Newcastle Knights	Belmore Sports Ground	30 Jul 2023	2	

=== First team ===
The first ever North Queensland Cowboys team played the Gold Coast Titans on 22 July 2023 at Cbus Super Stadium. The Gold Coast Titans won the match 16-6.

Jersey	Position	Player
1	Fullback	Francesca Goldthorp
2	Wing	China Polata
3	Centre	Jasmine Peters
16	Centre	Shellie Long
4	Wing	Mia Middleton
14	Five-eighth	Krystal Blackwell
7	Halfback	Kirra Dibb (c)
15	Prop	Sareka Mooka
9	Hooker	Emma Manzelmann
10	Prop	Tiana Raftstrand-Smith
11	Second-row	Shaniah Power
12	Second-row	Bree Chester
13	Lock	Makenzie Weale
8	Prop	Tallisha Harden (c)
18	Lock	Sera Koroi
21	Prop	April Ngatupuna
24	Wing	Vitalina Naikore
	Coach	Ben Jeffries

== Representative honours ==
=== National team representatives ===
Player	Club debut	Country	International debut	Years	Ref
Essay Banu	12 Aug 2023	Papua New Guinea	**1 Nov 2022**	2023–2025	
Jetaya Faifua	22 Jul 2023	Samoa	19 Oct 2024	2024	
Sera Koroi	22 Jul 2023	Papua New Guinea	**1 Nov 2022**	2023	
Shellie Long	22 Jul 2023	Papua New Guinea	**1 Nov 2022**	2023	
Ana Malupo	19 Jul 2025	Tonga	**19 Oct 2024**	2025	
Emma Manzelmann	22 Jul 2023	Australia	28 Oct 2023	2023	
Sareka Mooka	22 Jul 2023	Papua New Guinea	22 Oct 2023	2023–2024	
Vitalina Naikore	22 Jul 2023	Fiji	15 Oct 2023	2023–2024	
China Polata	22 Jul 2023	Tonga	**25 Jun 2022**	2023	
Jessikah Reeves	12 Aug 2023	Papua New Guinea	**1 Nov 2022**	2023	
Abigail Roache	5 Jul 2025	New Zealand	**10 Nov 2022**	2025	
Merewalesi Rokouono	16 Sep 2023	Fiji	15 Oct 2023	2023	
Lavinia Tauhalaliku	1 Sep 2024	Tonga	**25 Jun 2022**	2024	
Jazmon Tupou-Witchman	15 Sep 2024	Cook Islands	**2 Nov 2022**	2024	
Jakiya Whitfeld	27 Jul 2024	Australia	**28 Oct 2023**	2024–2025	

Notes:

- International Debut dates in **bold** indicate that the player made her first international appearance prior to playing for the North Queensland Cowboys NRLW team.

=== Women's State of Origin representatives ===
Past and current players who have played for Queensland and New South Wales in the State of Origin.

Player	State	Year(s)
Emma Manzelmann	Queensland	2024
Jasmine Peters	Queensland	2025
Makenzie Weale	Queensland	2024–2025
China Polata	Queensland	2023
Shaniah Power	Queensland	2023

=== Prime Minister's XIII representatives ===
Past and current players who have been selected to play in the Prime Minister's XIII.

Player	Year(s)
Tallisha Harden	2023
Emma Manzelmann	2023
Tiana Raftstrand-Smith	2023
China Polata	2023
Kirra Dibb	2024 – 2025
Lily Peacock	2024
Bree Chester	2024 – 2025
Krystal Blackwell	2024
Makenzie Weale	2025

=== All-Stars representatives ===
Past and current players who have played for the Indigenous All-Stars or for the Māori All-Stars.

==== Indigenous All Stars ====
Player	Year(s)
Jasmine Peters	2023, 2025, 2026
Tahlulah Tillett	2023
Bree Chester	2025 – 2026
Tallisha Harden	2024 – 2026
Kirra Dibb	2023 – 2025
Essay Banu	2023, 2025, 2026

==== Māori All Stars (Māori people) ====
Player	Year(s)
Tiana Raftstrand-Smith	2025
Najvada George	2025

== Stadium ==
In their inaugural season, the Cowboys will play three of their five home games at Townsville's Queensland Country Bank Stadium. The two other home games will be played at Langlands Park in Brisbane and Cbus Super Stadium in Robina.
