= Rosie Kelly =

NZ international rugby union & league player (born 2000)

- Born: 16 January 2000 (age 26) Hokitika, New Zealand
- Height: 1.59 m (5 ft 3 in)

Rugby union career
- Position: Fly-half
Provincial / State sides
Years	Team	Apps	(Points)
2017	Canterbury	4	(0)
2018–20	Otago	20	(192)
2021–	Canterbury	8	(13)
Super Rugby
Years	Team	Apps	(Points)
2022–2024	Matatū	14	(34)
2025–	Chiefs Manawa	3	(0)
International career
Years	Team	Apps	(Points)
2023	New Zealand	4	(2)
- Rugby league career

Playing information
- Position: Centre, Five-eighth, Halfback
Club
Years	Team	Pld	T	G	FG	P
2024	Parramatta Eels	3	1	0	0	4
2025–	Nth Qld Cowboys	18	2	21	0	50
	Total	21	3	21	0	54
- As of 18 November 2026

Rosie Kelly (born 16 January 2000) is a New Zealand professional rugby union and rugby league player who currently plays as a centre for the Canterbury-Bankstown Bulldogs in the NRL Women's Premiership. She previously played for the North Queensland Cowboys and Parramatta Eels. She played for Matatū before joining Chiefs Manawa for the 2025 Super Rugby Aupiki season.

== Early life ==
Kelly was born in the West Coast region of the South Island in the small town of Hokitika. She fell in love with rugby at a young age and played with the boys’ team until she was eleven. She attended Christchurch Girls’ High School and was in Year 12 when she was selected for Canterbury's Sevens squad at the end of 2016. She captained her school's first XV in Year 13 and was a specialist halfback.

== Rugby union career ==
Kelly was a member of Canterbury's winning 2017 Farah Palmer Cup squad. In November 2020, she was selected for the NZ Barbarians squad to play the Black Ferns in two matches.

Kelly was named in Matatū's squad for their inaugural season of Super Rugby Aupiki in November 2021. She made Canterbury's squad for the 2022 Farah Palmer Cup season, and started at fly-half in their opening match against Wellington.

Kelly featured in Matatū's first Super Rugby Aupiki win as they narrowly beat the Blues 33–31 at the start of the 2023 season. She also scored her first Super Rugby try in the final round of the competition, her side lost to Chiefs Manawa 38–46. She started in the grand final when Matatū defeated defending champions, Chiefs Manawa, to win their first title.

On 17 April 2023, Kelly was among 34 players who were given Black Ferns contracts as part of their build up to the 2025 Rugby World Cup. In June, she was named in the Black Ferns' 30-player squad to compete in the Pacific Four Series and O’Reilly Cup. She made her international debut against Australia on 29 June 2023 in Brisbane. She later featured in her side's 21–52 victory over Canada at the Pacific Four Series in Ottawa. She has played four test matches thus far for the Black Ferns against Australia (2), USA, Canada.

On 25 October 2024, it was announced that Kelly had joined Chiefs Manawa for the 2025 Super Rugby Aupiki season.

== Rugby league career ==
On 9 July 2024, the Parramatta Eels announced that they had signed Kelly on a one-year contract for the 2024 National Rugby League Women's season.

On 7 February 2025, she joined the North Queensland Cowboys, signing a three-year contract.

On 12 November 2026, she joined the Canterbury-Bankstown Bulldogs , signing a three-year contract.
