= Emma Manzelmann =

Australia international rugby league player (born 2001)

Personal information
- Born: 30 November 2001 (age 24) Mackay, Queensland, Australia
- Height: 166 cm (5 ft 5 in)
- Weight: 55 kg (8 st 9 lb)

Playing information
- Position: Hooker
Club
Years	Team	Pld	T	G	FG	P
2021–22	Newcastle Knights	12	2	0	0	8
2023–	Nth Qld Cowboys	36	7	6	0	40
	Total	48	9	6	0	48
Representative
Years	Team	Pld	T	G	FG	P
2023–26	Queensland	8	0	0	0	0
2023–24	Prime Minister's XIII	2	0	0	0	0
2023	Australia	1	0	0	0	0
- Source: As of 2 November 2026

Emma Manzelmann (born 30 November 2001) is an Australian professional rugby league footballer who currently plays for the North Queensland Cowboys in the NRL Women's Premiership.

Primarily a hooker, she previously played for the Newcastle Knights, where she was a member of their 2022 premiership-winning team.

== Background ==
Manzelmann was born in Mackay, Queensland and played her junior rugby league for the Walkerston Wanderers.

== Playing career ==
=== Early years ===
In May 2019, Manzelmann represented Mackay in the Northern Region Women's Championship and was named in the North Queensland Women's Emerging Marlins squad. In June 2019, she represented the Queensland women's under-18s team. In 2020, she played for the Mackay Magpies in the Mackay women's competition, before joining the North Queensland Gold Stars in the BHP Premiership. In September 2021, she was named the North Queensland Gold Stars Player of the Year. In December 2021, she signed with the Newcastle Knights to be a part of their inaugural NRLW squad.

=== 2022 ===
In round 1 of the delayed 2021 NRL Women's season, Manzelmann made her NRLW debut for the Knights against the Parramatta Eels.

On 2 October, Manzelmann played in the Knights' 2022 NRLW Grand Final win over the Parramatta Eels.

=== 2023 ===
On 4 April, Manzelmann signed with the North Queensland Cowboys, becoming the club's inaugural signing.

In June, she played both games for Queensland in their 2023 State of Origin series win over New South Wales.

In Round 1 of the 2023 NRL Women's season, she made her debut for the Cowboys, starting at hooker and scoring the club's first try in a 16–6 loss to the Gold Coast Titans.

On 28 October, she became the first Cowboy to represent Australia, coming off the bench in their 12–6 loss to New Zealand at AAMI Park.

=== 2024 ===
Manzelmann came off the bench for Queensland in all three games in their 2024 Women's State of Origin series win.

In Round 1 of the 2024 NRL Women's season, she came off the bench in the Cowboys' 14–0 loss to the Cronulla Sharks.

=== 2025 ===
On 1 July, Manzelmann was named co-captain of the Cowboys alongside Kirra Dibb, replacing Tallisha Harden.
