= Jakiya Whitfeld =

Australia international rugby league player (born 2001)

Personal information
- Born: 11 June 2001 (age 25) Canberra, Australian Capital Territory, Australia
- Height: 165 cm (5 ft 5 in)
- Weight: 66 kg (10 st 6 lb)

Playing information
- Position: Wing, Centre
Club
Years	Team	Pld	T	G	FG	P
2022	Newcastle Knights	2	0	0	0	0
2023	Wests Tigers	9	4	0	0	16
2024–	North Qld Cowboys	18	10	0	0	40
	Total	29	14	0	0	56
Representative
Years	Team	Pld	T	G	FG	P
2023	Prime Minister's XIII	1	4	0	0	16
2023–25	Australia	7	7	0	0	28
- Source: As of 1 November 2026

Jakiya Whitfeld (born 11 June 2001) is an Australian professional rugby league footballer who currently plays for the North Queensland Cowboys in the NRL Women's Premiership.

She previously played for the Newcastle Knights and Wests Tigers.

== Background ==
Born in Canberra, Australian Capital Territory, Whitfeld grew up in a small country town near Bathurst and played rugby union for Central West growing up.

== Playing career ==
=== Early years ===
In 2018, Whitfeld represented Australia in rugby sevens, playing in the World Schools Rugby 7s Tournament and the Oceania Rugby 7s Championship, then later representing the Sydney University side. In 2019, she represented Australia at the World Sevens Series. In 2020, she injured her ACL, causing her to miss out on selection for the Tokyo Olympics.

=== 2022 ===
In 2022, Whitfeld represented Australia again at the World Sevens Series. On 21 July, she switched to rugby league with the Newcastle Knights in the NRL Women's Premiership for the 2022 season, making her debut against the Parramatta Eels in round 3. She said, "I tested positive for COVID in the first week of pre-season, so I had to basically learn a whole new game in three weeks." She also played for the North Sydney Bears in the lower NSWRL Women's Premiership, where she was the competition's highest try-scorer.

=== 2023 ===
In May, Whitfeld joined new NRLW side West Tigers on a 1-year contract. Coach Brett Kimmorley said, "We made a decision to invest in seven players who weren't at the Wests Tigers and she's one of them. When we had our initial conversations when we recruited her, she told me she'd like to play wing but also wanted the possibility of playing centre. Time will tell what she'll be best suited at."

Whitfeld made her club debut on the wing, scoring two tries in Wests' inaugural game, a 36-8 victory over Parramatta. She scored another in round 2, making 21 runs for 292 metres, the second-most by any player in the history of the competition at that stage.

In September, she represented the Prime Minister's XIII, starting on the wing and scoring four tries in their win over the PNG Prime Minister's XIII.

On October 23, she signed with the North Queensland Cowboys on a three-year contract. On October 28, she made her Test debut for the Australia, starting on the wing in their loss to New Zealand.

=== 2024 ===
In March, Whitfeld played for the Mackay Cutters in the QRL Women's Premiership. In June, she was a member of New South Wales' State of Origin squad but did not play a game.

In Round 1 of the 2024 NRL Women's season, Whitfeld made her debut for the Cowboys, starting at centre 14–0 loss to the Cronulla Sharks. In Round 2, she scored two tries in a 38–34 win over the St George Illawarra Dragons.

On 30 September, she won the Cowboys' Players' Player award at their end of season presentation.

On 18 October, Whitfeld scored five tries for Australia in their 84–0 win over Papua New Guinea.
