= Ana Malupo =

Tongan international rugby league footballer

Personal information
- Born: 2005 (age 20–21) Darwin, Northern Territory, Australia
- Height: 180 cm (5 ft 11 in)
- Weight: 74 kg (11 st 9 lb)

Playing information
- Position: Wing, Fullback
Club
Years	Team	Pld	T	G	FG	P
2025–	Nth Qld Cowboys	3	0	0	0	0
Representative
Years	Team	Pld	T	G	FG	P
2024–25	Tonga	2	0	0	0	0
- Source: As of 5 November 2026

Ana Malupo (born 2005) is a professional rugby league footballer who currently plays for the North Queensland Cowboys in the NRL Women's Premiership.

Born in Australia, she is a Tongan international.

== Background ==
Malupo, who is of Tongan descent, was born in Darwin and played her junior rugby league for the Northern Sharks.

In 2023, she moved to Townsville, Queensland, where she attended Kirwan State High School.

== Playing career ==
In 2023 and 2024, Malupo played for the Townsville Blackhawks in the Harvey Norman Under-19s competition. In March 2024, she represented the Northern Territory Titans at the NRL Women's Championships on the Gold Coast.

In July 2024, Malupo joined the North Queensland Cowboys on a development contract and played in their pre-season trial against the Gold Coast Titans. On 19 October 2024, she made her Test debut for Tonga, starting at fullback in their 30–16 loss to Samoa.

On 9 December 2024, her development contract was upgraded to a Top 24 contract.

=== 2025 ===
In Round 3 of the 2025 NRL Women's season, Malupo made her NRLW debut, starting on the wing in a 16–14 win over the Cronulla Sharks.
