= Makenzie Weale =

Australian rugby league player (born 2002)

Personal information
- Born: 26 June 2002 (age 24) Brisbane, Queensland, Australia
- Height: 168 cm (5 ft 6 in)
- Weight: 80 kg (12 st 8 lb)

Playing information
- Position: Prop, Second-row, Lock
Club
Years	Team	Pld	T	G	FG	P
2022	Newcastle Knights	4	1	0	0	4
2023–	Nth Qld Cowboys	31	6	0	0	24
	Total	35	7	0	0	28
Representative
Years	Team	Pld	T	G	FG	P
2024–26	Queensland	8	1	0	0	4
2025	Prime Minister's XIII	1	0	0	0	0
2026	Australia	2	1	0	0	4
- Source: As of 16 November 2026

Makenzie Weale (born 26 June 2002) is an Australian professional rugby league footballer who currently plays for the North Queensland Cowboys in the NRL Women's Premiership.

A second-row or lock, she previously played for the Newcastle Knights.

== Background ==
Born in Brisbane, Queensland, Weale played her junior rugby league for the West Arana Panthers, also spending time with Wests Mitchelton.

== Playing career ==
=== Early years ===
In October 2018, Weale was named in the 2019 Queensland Academy of Sport under-18s squad. In 2019, she played for the University of Queensland rugby sevens side and travelled with Tribe 7's rugby team to Hong Kong to compete at the All Girls International Rugby Sevens tournament where the team were undefeated throughout the competition and won the tournament. In 2020, she joined the West Brisbane Panthers in the QRL Women's Premiership. In 2021, she played for the Queensland women's under-19s rugby league team.

=== 2022 ===
On 19 July, Weale signed a contract with QRL Women's Premiership side Norths Devils, to join them in 2023. On 21 July, she signed with the Newcastle Knights in the NRL Women's Premiership for the 2022 season. In round 2 of the 2022 NRLW season, she made her NRLW debut for the Knights against the Gold Coast Titans.

=== 2023 ===
Weale began the 2023 season playing for the Mackay Cutters in the QRL Women's Premiership.

On 10 May, Weale signed with the North Queensland Cowboys on a two-year contract. On 22 June, she was 19th player for Queensland in Game II of the 2023 State of Origin series.

In Round 1 of the 2023 NRL Women's season, she made her debut for the Cowboys, starting at lock in a 16–6 loss to the Gold Coast Titans. In Round 4, she scored her first try for the Cowboys in their 16–12 win over the Wests Tigers. In Round 7, she was sin binned for a hip drop tackle in a 48–18 loss to the St George Illawarra Dragons. She was subsequently suspended for three games, ending her season

=== 2024 ===
On 16 May, Weale made her State of Origin debut for Queensland, coming off the bench in their Game I loss to New South Wales. She played in all three games in Queensland's series win.

In Round 1 of the 2024 NRL Women's season, Weale started at prop in the Cowboys' 14–0 loss to the Cronulla Sharks, playing just five minutes before leaving the field due to a concussion.

On 9 December, Weale re-signed with the Cowboys until the end of the 2027 season.

=== 2025 ===
On 12 October 2025 she made her debut for the Prime Minister's XIII in the 50-0 win over the PNG Orchids in Port Moresby

=== 2026 ===
She made her Australia début in the 2026 Rugby League World Cup 78-0 win over England on 24 October 2026.

== Achievements and accolades ==
=== Representative ===
- Rugby League World Cup Champion: 2026
