= China Polata =

Tonga international rugby league footballer (born 2002)

Personal information
- Full name: China Efrosinia Polata
- Born: 26 February 2002 (age 24) Brisbane, Queensland, Australia
- Height: 173 cm (5 ft 8 in)
- Weight: 69 kg (10 st 12 lb)

Playing information
- Position: Wing, Prop, Second-row, Lock
Club
| Years | Team | Pld | T | G | FG | P |
|---|---|---|---|---|---|---|
| 2021 | Brisbane Broncos | 1 | 0 | 0 | 0 | 0 |
| 2023–25 | North Queensland Cowboys | 17 | 3 | 0 | 0 | 12 |
| 2026– | Cronulla-Sutherland Sharks | 9 | 1 | 0 | 0 | 4 |
| | Total | 27 | 4 | 0 | 0 | 16 |
Representative
| Years | Team | Pld | T | G | FG | P |
| 2022–23 | Tonga | 2 | 1 | 0 | 0 | 4 |
| 2023 | Queensland | 1 | 0 | 0 | 0 | 0 |
| 2023–26 | Prime Minister's XIII | 2 | 0 | 0 | 0 | 0 |
- Source: As of 16 November 2026

China Polata (born 26 February 2002) is an Australian professional rugby league footballer who currently plays for the Cronulla-Sutherland Sharks in the NRL Women's Premiership.

She previously played as a Second-row for the North Queensland Cowboys.

== Background ==
Polata was born in Brisbane, Queensland and is of Tongan and Ukrainian descent. She attended John Paul College in Daisy Hill and played her junior rugby league for the Redbank Plains Bears.

== Playing career ==
In 2018, Polata represented Queensland at the under-17 national rugby sevens championships at Ballymore Stadium.

In 2019, Polata began playing rugby league for Brothers St Brendans and represented Queensland under-18 in their 24–4 loss to New South Wales. In August 2019, she signed a development contract with the Brisbane Broncos.

In 2020, Polata played for the Souths Logan Magpies in the QRL Women's Premiership. She tore her ACL later that year, missing the entire 2021 season.

=== 2022 ===
In Round 4 of the delayed 2021 NRL Women's season, Polata made her NRLW debut for the Broncos on the wing against the Gold Coast Titans. Following the NRLW season, she played for Souths Logan in the QRL Women's Premiership.

In June, she made her international debut for Tonga, starting at five-eighth and scoring a try in their 50–12 loss to New Zealand. In November, Polata moved to Townsville, in hopes of gaining a contract with the newly established North Queensland Cowboys NRLW team.

=== 2023 ===
Polata began the 2023 season playing for the Mackay Cutters in the QRL Women's Premiership.

On 10 May, Polata signed with the North Queensland Cowboys. On 23 June, she made her State of Origin debut for Queensland, starting on the wing in Game II of the 2023 State of Origin series.

In Round 1 of the 2023 NRL Women's season, she made her debut for the Cowboys, starting on the wing in a 16–6 loss to the Gold Coast Titans. In Round 2, she was named to start on the wing but played at prop in a 31–20 win over the Newcastle Knights. In Round 4, she scored her first NRLW try in a 16–12 win over the Wests Tigers.

=== 2024 ===
In Round 1 of the 2024 NRL Women's season, Polata started at second-row Cowboys' 14–0 loss to the Cronulla-Sutherland Sharks. In Round 6, she tore her ACL in a loss to the Broncos, ruling her out for the remainder of the season.

=== 2025 ===
In Round 8 of the 2025 NRL Women's season, Polata returned from her ACL injury, scoring a try in the Cowboys' 30–8 win over the Wests Tigers.

On 7 November 2025 it was reported that she had signed for Cronulla-Sutherland Sharks in the NRL Women's Premiership on a 2-year deal.

=== 2026 ===
She played for Prime Minister's XIII on 3 October 2026 in the 6-66 win over PNG Prime Minister's XIII in Port Moresby.
