= Lily Peacock =

Australian rugby league footballer (born 2005)

Personal information
- Full name: Lily Peacock
- Born: 10 July 2005 (age 21) Gold Coast, Queensland, Australia
- Height: 171 cm (5 ft 7 in)
- Weight: 75 kg (11 st 11 lb)

Playing information
- Position: Prop
Club
Years	Team	Pld	T	G	FG	P
2023–	Nth Qld Cowboys	23	2	0	0	8
Representative
Years	Team	Pld	T	G	FG	P
2024	Prime Minister's XIII	1	0	0	0	0
- Source: As of 13 September 2025

Lily Peacock (born 10 July 2005) is an Australian professional rugby league footballer who currently plays for the North Queensland Cowboys in the NRL Women's Premiership.

== Background ==
Peacock was born on the Gold Coast, Queensland and raised in Proserpine, where she played her junior rugby league for the Proserpine Brahmans.

== Playing career ==
=== Early years ===
In 2022, Peacock played for the Mackay Cutters under-19s and represented the Queensland Country under-17 side.

=== 2023 ===
In 2023, Peacock began the season playing for the Cutters under-19s side before moving up to their QRL Women's Premiership team, playing three games.

On 23 May, she signed a development contract with the North Queensland Cowboys. On 13 July, she came off the bench for Queensland under-19 in their 20–14 win over New South Wales, running for 107 metres.

In Round 7 of the 2023 NRL Women's season, she made her NRLW debut for the Cowboys in a 48–16 loss to the St George Illawarra Dragons.

=== 2024 ===
In May, Peacock started at prop in the Cutters' Grand Final win over the Norths Devils and was named Player of the Match.

On 20 June, Peacock represented Queensland under-19, starting at prop in their loss to New South Wales. On 21 June, she was called into the senior Queensland women's squad as an injury replacement.

In Round 1 of the 2024 NRL Women's season, she came off the bench in the Cowboys' 14–0 loss to the Cronulla Sharks. In Round 2, she scored her first NRLW try in a 38–34 win over the St George Illawarra Dragons.

On 13 October, Peacock represented the Australian Prime Minister's XIII in their win over Papua New Guinea.
