= Ben Jeffries =

Australian rugby league footballer

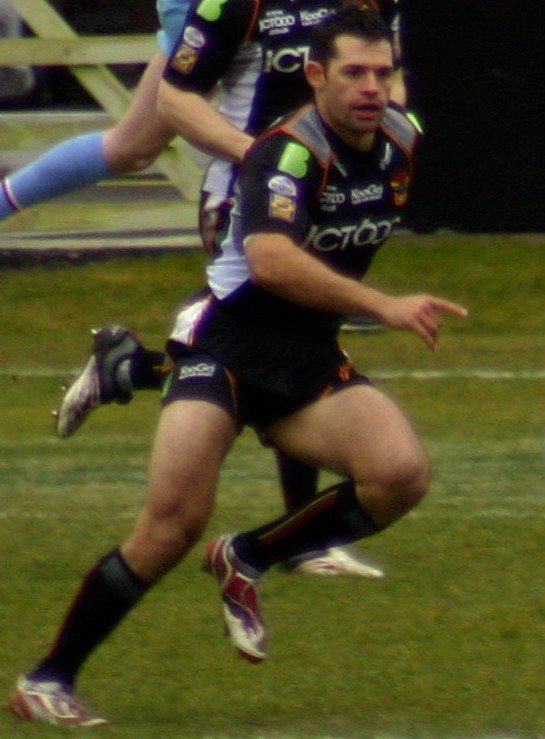

Personal information
- Born: 4 September 1980 (age 46) Forster, New South Wales, Australia
- Height: 176 cm (5 ft 9 in)
- Weight: 82 kg (12 st 13 lb)

Playing information
- Position: Stand-off, Scrum-half
Club
Years	Team	Pld	T	G	FG	P
2001	St. George Illawarra	1	0	0	0	0
2001–02	Wests Tigers	27	7	5	0	38
2002–07	Wakefield Trinity Wildcats	143	69	7	4	294
2008–09	Bradford Bulls	49	15	0	0	60
2010–11	Wakefield Trinity Wildcats	27	8	13	1	59
2011–12	Bradford Bulls	37	8	0	0	32
	Total	284	107	25	5	483

Coaching information
Club
Years	Team	Gms	W	D	L	W%
2023	NQ Cowboys Women	9	2	0	7	22
2024–	Newcastle Knights Women	23	14	0	9	61
	Total	32	16	0	16	50
Representative
Years	Team	Gms	W	D	L	W%
2020–23	Indigenous Women's All Stars	3	2	0	0	67
2022–26	PNG Orchids	5	3	0	2	60
- Source: As of 22 November 2026

Ben Jeffries (born 4 September 1980) is an Australian rugby league coach and former professional player who is the head coach of the Newcastle Knights Women NRL Women's Premiership team

A stand-off or scrum-half, he played the majority of his career for Wakefield Trinity and the Bradford Bulls in the Super League after starting his career playing for the St George Illawarra Dragons and Wests Tigers in the NRL.

== Playing career ==
=== Early years ===
Born in Forster, Jeffries grew up in Forster and attended Forster High School, where he represented the Australian Schoolboys in 1998 and was signed by the Newcastle Knights.

=== St George Illawarra Dragons ===
In 2000, after two seasons in the Knights' lower grades, Jeffries joined the St George Illawarra Dragons. In Round 4 of the 2001 NRL season, he made his NRL debut in the Dragons 34–6 loss to the New Zealand Warriors, his only appearance for the club.

=== Wests Tigers ===
In 2001, Jeffries joined the Wests Tigers halfway through the season, playing nine games. In 2002, he played 18 games for the side, starting 16 at halfback.

=== Wakefield Trinity ===
In 2003, Jeffries joined Super League side Wakefield Trinity, playing 27 games in his first season at the club. In 2004, he played 33 games, scoring 24 tries and leading Wakefield to the finals. In 2005, he despite Wakefield's 10th-place finish, Jeffries scored 20 tries in 27 games, finishing as the club's top try scorer. Following his successful 2005 season, he signed a new three-year deal with the club. In 2007, after 143 games for the club, Jeffries joined the Bradford Bulls.

=== Bradford Bulls ===
In 2007, Jeffries played 27 games for the Bradford Bulls as they qualified for the finals series. On 11 September 2009, after two seasons with Bradford, he signed a three-year deal to return to Wakefield.

=== Wakefield Trinity (second stint) ===
In 2010, Jeffries played 22 games in his return season for Wakefield. On 7 May 2011, after playing five games for the Wakefield, Jeffries re-joined Bradford on an 18-month contract.

=== Bradford Bulls (second stint) ===
Jeffries appeared in every game for the rest of the 2011 season after returning to Bradford, starting at five-eighth from Round 14 to Round 27. In 2012, he featured in five consecutive games from Round 4 to Round 8. He missed Round 9 due to injury but returned a week later to play in nine consecutive games from Round 10 to Round 18. He also played in Round 20 and then from Round 23 to Round 26.

On 5 September 2012, he announced his departure from the Bradford Bulls to return to Australia to play part-time for the Kurri Kurri Bulldogs. At the time, Jeffries was the only Australian to play 10 consecutive years in the Super League.

=== Northern Pride ===
In 2014 Jeffries signed to the Cairns-based Northern Pride Queensland Cup side. He sustained an arm injury in his debut game and did not play again that season.

== Coaching career ==
In 2014, Jeffries worked as an assistant coach for the Newcastle Knights SG Ball Cup side. Later that year, he joined the Northern Pride Queensland Cup side, playing one game, and working as the strength & conditioning and hookers & halves coach for their Cyril Connell Cup and Mal Meninga Cup sides. In 2015, he left the club after playing three trial games, being granted a release.

In 2015, Jeffries began working for the NRL as a Development Manager in Townsville. In 2016, he coached the Townsville women's team and the NQ Marlins under-14 girls side. On 19 October 2016, he became head coach of the Queensland Murri women's team.

In 2017, he joined the North Queensland Cowboys as an assistant coach their under-20 side under head coach Aaron Payne. Later that year, he was an assistant coach for the Queensland women's team.

In 2018, he was the assistant coach for the Townsville Blackhawks and head coach for the QAS women's under-18 squad.

On 20 December 2018, Jeffries was announced as the North Queensland Cowboys Elite Pathways coach, taking over from Aaron Payne.

In 2020, Jeffries coached the Indigenous Women's All Stars. He was again named head coach of the side for 2022 and 2023. In 2022, he coached the PNG Orchids at the 2021 Rugby League World Cup.

On 24 November 2022, he was announced as the North Queensland Cowboys Women inaugural NRLW head coach. On 15 December 2023, he was released by the club.

== Statistics ==
Statistics are correct to the end of the 2012 season

=== NRL ===
Season	Team	Matches	T	G	GK %	F/G	Pts
2001	St George Illawarra	1	0	0	—	0	0
2001	Wests Tigers	9	2	0	—	0	8
2002	Wests Tigers	18	5	5	55.56%	0	30
Career totals		28	7	5	55.56%	0	38

=== Super League ===
Season	Team	Matches	T	G	GK %	F/G	Pts
2003	Wakefield Trinity	27	9	1	—	0	38
2004	Wakefield Trinity	33	24	0	—	4	100
2005	Wakefield Trinity	28	20	0	—	0	80
2006	Wakefield Trinity	26	5	6	—	0	32
2007	Wakefield Trinity	29	11	0	—	0	44
2008	Bradford	27	11	0	—	0	44
2009	Bradford	22	4	0	—	0	16
2010	Wakefield Trinity	22	5	13	—	1	47
2011	Wakefield Trinity	5	3	0	—	0	12
2011	Bradford	15	3	0	—	0	12
2012	Bradford	22	5	0	—	0	20
Career totals		256	100	20	—	5	445
