= Fran Goldthorp =

England international rugby league & union player

Personal information
- Full name: Francesca Goldthorp
- Born: 11 January 2003 (age 23) Leeds, West Yorkshire, England
- Height: 1.66 m (5 ft 5 in)
- Weight: 65 kg (10 st 3 lb)

Playing information

Rugby league
- Position: Fullback, Wing, Centre
Club
Years	Team	Pld	T	G	FG	P
2019–23	Leeds Rhinos	44	45	0	0	180
2023–	North Qld Cowboys	39	13	0	0	52
	Total	83	58	0	0	232
Representative
Years	Team	Pld	T	G	FG	P
2021–26	England	11	7	0	0	28

Rugby union
- Position: Fullback
Club
Years	Team	Pld	T	G	FG	P
2021–23	Loughborough Lightning	20	4	0	0	20
2024–25	Loughborough Lightning	0	0	0	0	0
	Total	20	4	0	0	20
- Source: Leeds Rhinos profile As of 30 October 2026

Francesca Goldthorp (born 11 January 2003) is an England international dual-code rugby league footballer who plays for the North Queensland Cowboys in the NRL Women's Premiership primarily as a fullback or wing. Previously she played for Loughborough Lightning in the Premiership Women's Rugby primarily as a fullback. Leeds Rhinos in the RFL Women's Super League where she predominantly played at centre or wing.

Goldthorp was a student at Loughborough University where she also played rugby union for Loughborough Lightning in the Premier 15s, as well as for England under-20s.

== Early and personal life ==
Born in Leeds, West Yorkshire, Goldthorp played rugby union and cricket at junior level including captaining the Yorkshire Cricket Board under-15 team as they won the County Championship in 2018. Her brother Eliot is a footballer.

== Club career ==
=== Leeds Rhinos ===
Goldthorp's first rugby league experience came with Guiseley Rangers which brought her to the attention of the Leeds Rhinos, who signed her to the club's under-19 squad.

Aged only 16, Goldthorp made her first team debut for the Rhinos against Castleford in a Women's Super League match on 28 April 2019. In the 2019 Women's Challenge Cup final, also against Castleford, Goldthorp scored a try as Leeds retained the cup. Goldthorp ended the debut season with two tries in the Grand Final, another meeting with Castleford.

With the 2020 season cancelled due to the COVID-19 pandemic it was 2021 before Goldthorp played again. Although the Rhinos did not win any trophies during the 2021 season, Goldthorp set a new club try-scoring record with 20 tries in 12 games. Goldthorp was nominated for the Woman of Steel award, losing out to Jodie Cunningham.

In 2022, Goldthorp scored 13 tries in 15 appearances to help Leeds reach the final of the Challenge Cup and was in the team that beat York City Knights 12–4 in the Grand Final.

=== North Queensland Cowboys ===
On 29 April 2023, Goldthorp signed a two-year contract with the North Queensland Cowboys in the NRL Women's Premiership.

In Round 1 of the 2023 NRL Women's season, she made her NRLW debut, starting at fullback in a 16–6 loss to the Gold Coast Titans. In Round 7, she scored her first NRLW try in a 48–18 loss to the St George Illawarra Dragons.

On 9 December 2024, Goldthorp re-signed with the Cowboys until the end of the 2027 season.

In the 2025 NRLW season Goldthorp found a home on the wing. She played every minute of every game and was awarded the Players' Player award and made a contender for the 2025 RLPA Players' Champion award.

In 11 games, Goldthorp crossed for five tries, while also registering seven line breaks and 43 tackle breaks.

Goldthorp’s 1,558 running metres were the most of any Cowboys player and the eighth most in the competition.

Goldthorp also played in the clubs first ever finals appearance scoring a try.

The 2026 NRLW season was Goldthorp's strongest yet. Goldthorp once again found her way back to fullback and by seasons end has 1626 run metres, averaging 147 metres per game.

At the Cowboys presentation night Goldthorp was named Members player of the year and NRLW Cowboys player of the year. In winning the main award she received a new Toyota however some work needs to be done as she is yet to get her drivers license.

=== Loughborough Lightning ===
On 9 Oct 2024 it was reported that she had re-signed for Loughborough Lightning playing in the Premiership Women's Rugby following the commencement of the 2024 NRL Women's Premiership season

== International career ==
Goldthorp's abilities were recognised with a call-up to the England squad and she made her international debut against Wales on 26 June 2021, celebrating the occasion with her first international try. 2021 ended with a second England appearance, against France in October.

2022 saw two more England appearances in the mid-season games, against France and Wales, scoring a try against France and two against Wales.

In September 2022, Goldthorp was named in the England squad for the World Cup to be held in November 2022.
