= Alisha Foord =

Australian rugby league footballer (born 1997)

Personal information
- Full name: Alisha Foord
- Born: 15 February 1997 (age 29) Townsville, Queensland, Australia
- Height: 166 cm (5 ft 5 in)
- Weight: 67 kg (10 st 8 lb)

Playing information
- Position: Hooker, Five-eighth, Halfback
Club
Years	Team	Pld	T	G	FG	P
2023–	Nth Qld Cowboys	24	4	0	0	16
- Source: As of 1 November 2026

Alisha Foord (born 16 February 1997) is an Australian professional rugby league footballer who currently plays for the North Queensland Cowboys in the NRL Women's Premiership.

== Background ==
Foord was born in Townsville, Queensland. She played her junior rugby league for the Norths Thuringowa Devils and attended St Margaret Mary's College.

== Playing career ==
=== Early years ===
In 2021, Foord was a member of the North Queensland Gold Stars QRL Women's Premiership squad but missed the entire season due to a torn ACL. In 2022, she played three games for the side.

=== 2023 ===
In 2023, Foord began the season with the Mackay Cutters QRLW team, playing eight games.

In June, she began training with the North Queensland Cowboys, playing in their pre-season trial against the Gold Coast Titans. In Round 9 of the 2023 NRL Women's season, she made her debut for the Cowboys, coming off the bench in a loss to the Sydney Roosters.

=== 2024 ===
In May, Foord started at hooker in the Cutters' Grand Final win over the Norths Devils.

In Round 1 of the 2024 NRL Women's season, she started at hooker in the Cowboys' 14–0 loss to the Cronulla Sharks. She broke her hand in the Cowboys' Round 3 loss to the Eels, ruling her out for the rest of the season.

=== 2025 ===
In Round 2 of the 2025 NRL Women's season, Foord scored her first NRLW try in a loss to the Newcastle Knights.
