= Bree Chester =

Australian rugby league footballer (born 2002)

Personal information
- Full name: Bree Chester
- Born: 28 June 2002 (age 24) Port Stephens, New South Wales, Australia
- Height: 171 cm (5 ft 7 in)
- Weight: 72 kg (11 st 5 lb)

Playing information
- Position: Second-row, Lock
Club
Years	Team	Pld	T	G	FG	P
2023–	Nth Qld Cowboys	40	5	0	0	20
Representative
Years	Team	Pld	T	G	FG	P
2023–25	Indigenous All Stars	2	0	0	0	0
2024–26	Prime Minister's XIII	3	0	0	0	0
- Source: As of 17 November 2026

Bree Chester (born 28 June 2002) is an Australian professional rugby league footballer who currently plays as a second-row and lock forward for the North Queensland Cowboys in the NRL Women's Premiership. She is an Indigenous All Stars representative.

== Background ==
Chester was born in Port Stephens, New South Wales and is of Indigenous Australian descent. She played her junior rugby league for the Mallabula Panthers.

== Playing career ==
=== Early years ===
In 2019, Chester played for the Penrith Panthers in the Tarsha Gale Cup. In 2020 and 2021, she played for the Newcastle Knights Tarsha Gale side.

In 2022, Chester played for the Knights in the NSWRL Women's Premiership and was a member of their NRLW squad.

=== 2023 ===
In February, Chester represented the Indigenous All Stars in their loss to the Māori All Stars.

On 10 May, she signed a two-year contract with the North Queensland Cowboys.

In Round 1 of the 2023 NRL Women's season, she made her NRLW debut, starting at second-row in a 16–6 loss to the Gold Coast Titans. In Round 2, she scored her first NRLW try in a 31–20 win over the Newcastle Knights.

=== 2024 ===
In May, Chester started at second-row in the Mackay Cutters' QRL Women's Premiership Grand Final win over the Norths Devils.

In Round 1 of the 2024 NRL Women's season, she started at lock in the Cowboys' 14–0 loss to the Cronulla Sharks. On 16 August, she re-signed with the Cowboys until the end of the 2026 season.

On 30 September, she was named the Cowboys' Player of the Year. On 13 October, she represented the Australian Prime Minister's XIII in their win over Papua New Guinea.

=== 2026 ===
She played for Prime Minister's XIII on 3 October 2026 in the 6-66 win over PNG Prime Minister's XIII in Port Moresby.
