= Essay Banu =

PNG international rugby league footballer (born 2002)

Personal information
- Born: 25 May 2002 (age 24) Tully, Queensland, Australia
- Height: 167 cm (5 ft 6 in)
- Weight: 97 kg (15 st 4 lb)

Playing information
- Position: Prop, Second-row
Club
Years	Team	Pld	T	G	FG	P
2023–	North Qld Cowboys	30	2	0	0	8
Representative
Years	Team	Pld	T	G	FG	P
2022–26	Papua New Guinea	13	2	0	0	8
2023–25	Indigenous All Stars	2	0	0	0	0
2023–24	PNG PM's XIII	2	0	0	0	0
- Source: As of 1 November 2026

Essay Banu (born 25 May 2002) is a professional rugby league footballer who currently plays for the North Queensland Cowboys in the NRL Women's Premiership and Papua New Guinea.

She represented Papua New Guinea at the 2021 Women's Rugby League World Cup.

== Background ==
Banu was born in Tully, Queensland and is of Papua New Guinean and Torres Strait Islander islander descent.

She played her junior rugby league for the Tully Tigers and attended Tully State High School.

== Playing career ==
In 2022, Banu played for the Wynnum Manly Seagulls in the QRL Women's Premiership, where she was named the competition's Prop of the Year.

In November 2022, she represented Papua New Guinea at the Women's World Cup, playing four games and scoring a try in their 34–12 win over Canada.

=== 2023 ===
On 10 February, Banu signed for the Mackay Cutters in the QRL Women's Premiership. On 11 February, Banu played for the Indigenous All Stars.

On 24 April, Banu signed with the North Queensland Cowboys NRLW side.

In Round 4 of the 2023 NRL Women's season, Banu made her NRLW debut in the Cowboys' 16–12 win over the Wests Tigers.

=== 2024 ===
In May, Banu started at prop in the Cutters' Grand Final win over the Norths Devils.

In Round 1 of the 2024 NRL Women's season, Banu came off the bench in the Cowboys' 14–0 loss to the Cronulla Sharks.

On 9 November, she re-signed with the Cowboys until the end of the 2026 season.
