= Tiana Raftstrand-Smith =

New Zealand rugby league footballer (born 2003)

Personal information
- Born: 17 July 2003 (age 23) Auckland, New Zealand
- Height: 173 cm (5 ft 8 in)
- Weight: 84 kg (13 st 3 lb)

Playing information
- Position: Second-row, Centre, Prop
Club
| Years | Team | Pld | T | G | FG | P |
|---|---|---|---|---|---|---|
| 2021–22 | Gold Coast Titans | 11 | 1 | 1 | 0 | 6 |
| 2023– | Nth Qld Cowboys | 27 | 8 | 0 | 0 | 32 |
| | Total | 38 | 9 | 1 | 0 | 38 |
Representative
| Years | Team | Pld | T | G | FG | P |
| 2021–22 | Queensland | 2 | 0 | 0 | 0 | 0 |
| 2022–25 | Māori All Stars | 4 | 0 | 0 | 0 | 0 |
| 2023 | Prime Minister's XIII | 1 | 0 | 0 | 0 | 0 |
- Source: As of 1 November 2026
- Relatives: Ebony Raftstrand-Smith (sister); Portia Woodman (aunt)

Tiana Raftstrand-Smith (born 17 June 2003) is a professional rugby league footballer who currently plays for the North Queensland Cowboys in the NRL Women's Premiership.

A second-row, centre, she previously played for the Gold Coast Titans.

== Background ==
Raftstrand-Smith was born in Auckland and is of Māori and Norwegian descent. She played her junior rugby league for the Richmond Rovers before moving to the Gold Coast, Queensland as a 13-year old. In Australia, she attended Keebra Park State High School and played rugby league for the Parkwood Sharks.

Raftstrand-Smith's aunt, Portia Woodman, is a New Zealand rugby sevens and rugby union international.

== Playing career ==
=== Early years ===
While at Keeba Park, Raftstrand-Smith was a member of the Australian rugby sevens Youth Development Program.

In 2021 and 2022, she played for the Burleigh Bears in the QRL Women's Premiership, winning a Grand Final with the club in 2021.

On 25 June 2021, the 18–year old Raftstrand-Smith started at second-row for Queensland in their State of Origin win over New South Wales. In August 2021, she signed with the Gold Coast Titans.

=== 2022 ===
In February, Raftstrand-Smith represented the Māori All Stars against the Indigenous All Stars.

In Round 1 of the delayed 2021 NRL Women's season, she made her NRLW debut for the Titans against the St George Illawarra Dragons. On 24 June 2022, she came off the bench for Queensland in their 20–14 loss to New South Wales.

=== 2023 ===
Raftstrand-Smith began the 2023 season playing for the Canterbury-Bankstown Bulldogs in the NSWRL Women's Premiership.

On 20 May, Raftrand-Smith signed with the North Queensland Cowboys NRLW team on a two-year contract, alongside her younger sister Ebony.

In Round 1 of the 2023 NRL Women's season, she made her debut for the Cowboys, starting at prop in a 16–6 loss to the Gold Coast Titans.

=== 2024 ===
In Round 1 of the 2024 NRL Women's season, Raftstrand-Smith started at second-row in the Cowboys' 14–0 loss to the Cronulla Sharks. In Round 2, she scored two tries in a 38–34 win over the St George Illawarra Dragons.

On 9 November, she re-signed with the Cowboys until the end of the 2027 season.
