= Jasmine Peters =

Australian rugby league footballer (born 2002)

Personal information
- Born: 7 July 2002 (age 24) Brisbane, Queensland, Australia
- Height: 165 cm (5 ft 5 in)
- Weight: 75 kg (11 st 11 lb)

Playing information
- Position: Centre, Wing
Club
Years	Team	Pld	T	G	FG	P
2021–22	Gold Coast Titans	8	4	0	0	16
2023–	Nth Qld Cowboys	40	14	0	0	56
	Total	48	18	0	0	72
Representative
Years	Team	Pld	T	G	FG	P
2021–25	Indigenous All Stars	5	0	0	0	0
2025–26	Queensland	5	1	0	0	4
2025	Prime Minister's XIII	1	0	0	0	0
- Source: As of 16 November 2026

Jasmine Peters (born 7 July 2002) is an Australian professional rugby league footballer who currently plays for the North Queensland Cowboys in the NRL Women's Premiership.

A centre, she previously played for the Gold Coast Titans.

== Background ==
Peters was born in Brisbane, Queensland and is of Torres Strait Islander and Filipino descent. She played her junior rugby league for Norths Devils Mackay and attended Mackay North State High School.

== Playing career ==
=== Early years ===
Originally a junior soccer player, Peters switched to rugby league with the assistance of her father Marco, hiding the switch of sports from her mother Paula.

In 2019, Peters played for the Canterbury-Bankstown Bulldogs in the Tarsha Gale Cup competition and represented the Queensland under-18 side at just 16 years old.

In 2020, she played for the North Queensland Gold Stars in the QRL Women's Premiership, playing one game before the competition was cancelled due to COVID-19. In 2021, she represented the Indigenous All Stars and Queensland under-19. In August 2021, she signed with the Gold Coast Titans.

=== 2022 ===
In February, Peters again played for the Indigenous All Stars against the Māori All Stars. In June, she started at fullback and scored a try in the Gold Stars' QRLW Grand Final win over the Central Queensland Capras.

In Round 2 of the delayed 2021 NRL Women's season, she made her NRLW debut for the Titans against the Sydney Roosters. She played five games in the Titans' inaugural season, scoring four tries. She returned for the 2022 NRL Women's season, playing three games.

=== 2023 ===
On 10 April, Peters signed with the North Queensland Cowboys on a three-year contract.

In Round 1 of the 2023 NRL Women's season, she made her debut for the Cowboys, starting at centre in a 16–6 loss to the Gold Coast Titans. In Round 2, she scored her first try for the club in a 31–20 win over the Newcastle Knights. In Round 4, she scored the winning try in the Cowboys' 16–12 victory over the Wests Tigers.

=== 2024 ===
In May, Peters started at centre and scored a try in the Mackay Cutters' QRLW Grand Final win over the Norths Devils.

In Round 1 of the 2024 NRL Women's season, she started at centre in the Cowboys' 14–0 loss to the Cronulla Sharks. In Round 2, she scored a try in a 38–34 win over the St George Illawarra Dragons.
