= Tallisha Harden =

Australia international rugby league footballer (born 1992)

Personal information
- Born: 21 July 1992 (age 34) Logan, Queensland, Australia
- Height: 178 cm (5 ft 10 in)
- Weight: 84 kg (13 st 3 lb)

Playing information
- Position: Second-row, Lock, Prop
Club
| Years | Team | Pld | T | G | FG | P |
|---|---|---|---|---|---|---|
| 2018 | Brisbane Broncos | 1 | 0 | 0 | 0 | 0 |
| 2019 | Sydney Roosters | 3 | 0 | 0 | 0 | 0 |
| 2020–22 | Brisbane Broncos | 14 | 2 | 0 | 0 | 8 |
| 2023– | Nth Qld Cowboys | 38 | 0 | 0 | 0 | 0 |
| | Total | 56 | 2 | 0 | 0 | 8 |
Representative
| Years | Team | Pld | T | G | FG | P |
| 2014–25 | Indigenous All Stars | 8 | 0 | 0 | 0 | 0 |
| 2015–22 | Queensland | 5 | 0 | 0 | 0 | 0 |
| 2015–22 | Australia | 4 | 3 | 0 | 0 | 12 |
| 2019 | Australia 9s | 3 | 0 | 0 | 0 | 0 |
| 2023 | Prime Minister's XIII | 1 | 0 | 0 | 0 | 0 |
- Source: RLP As of 16 November 2026

Tallisha Harden (born 21 July 1992) is an Australian rugby league footballer who plays for the North Queensland Cowboys in the NRL Women's Premiership.

Primarily a second-rower, she is an Australian and Queensland representative and previously played for the Brisbane Broncos and Sydney Roosters.

== Playing career ==
=== Rugby union ===
A former Australian representative indoor volleyball player, Harden began playing rugby union at age 19. She played for Sunnybank and Queensland before switching full-time to rugby league in 2018.

=== Rugby league ===
In 2013, Harden began playing rugby league. In 2014, she represented the Indigenous All Stars. In 2015, 2016 and 2020, she captained the side.

On 3 May 2015, she made her Test debut for Australia, coming off the bench in a 22–14 win over New Zealand at Suncorp Stadium. On 27 June 2015, she made her debut for Queensland in a 4–all draw with New South Wales at 1300SMILES Stadium.

In June 2018, Harden represented South East Queensland at the inaugural Women's National Championships. On 14 June 2018, she joined the Brisbane Broncos NRL Women's Premiership team. In Round 3 of the 2018 NRL Women's season, she made her debut for the Broncos in a 32–10 win over the New Zealand Warriors.

In May 2019, she represented South East Queensland at the Women's National Championships. On 29 June 2019, she signed with the Sydney Roosters NRLW team and was named their Player of the Year at the end of the season.

In October 2019, Harden represented Australia at the 2019 Rugby League World Cup 9s and earned a recall to the Jillaroos Test side after a four-year absence, coming off the bench and scoring a try in a 28–8 win over New Zealand at WIN Stadium.

In September 2020, Harden re-joined the Brisbane Broncos NRLW side. On 25 October 2020, she started at second-row and scored a try in the Broncos' 20–10 Grand Final win over the Roosters.

On 20 February 2021, she captained the Indigenous All Stars in their 24–0 loss to the Māori All Stars.

On 11 May 2023, Harden signed for the North Queensland Cowboys on a one-year contract. On 28 June, she was named as the inaugural co-captain of the Cowboys, alongside Kirra Dibb.

In Round 1 of the 2023 NRL Women's season, she made her debut for the Cowboys, starting at prop in a 16–6 loss to the Gold Coast Titans.

On 9 December 2024, Harden re-signed with the Cowboys for the 2025 season.

== Achievements and accolades ==
=== Individual ===
- Sydney Roosters Player of the Year: 2019

=== Team ===
- 2020 NRLW Grand Final: Brisbane Broncos – Winners
