= Kirra Dibb =

Australia international rugby league footballer (born 1997)

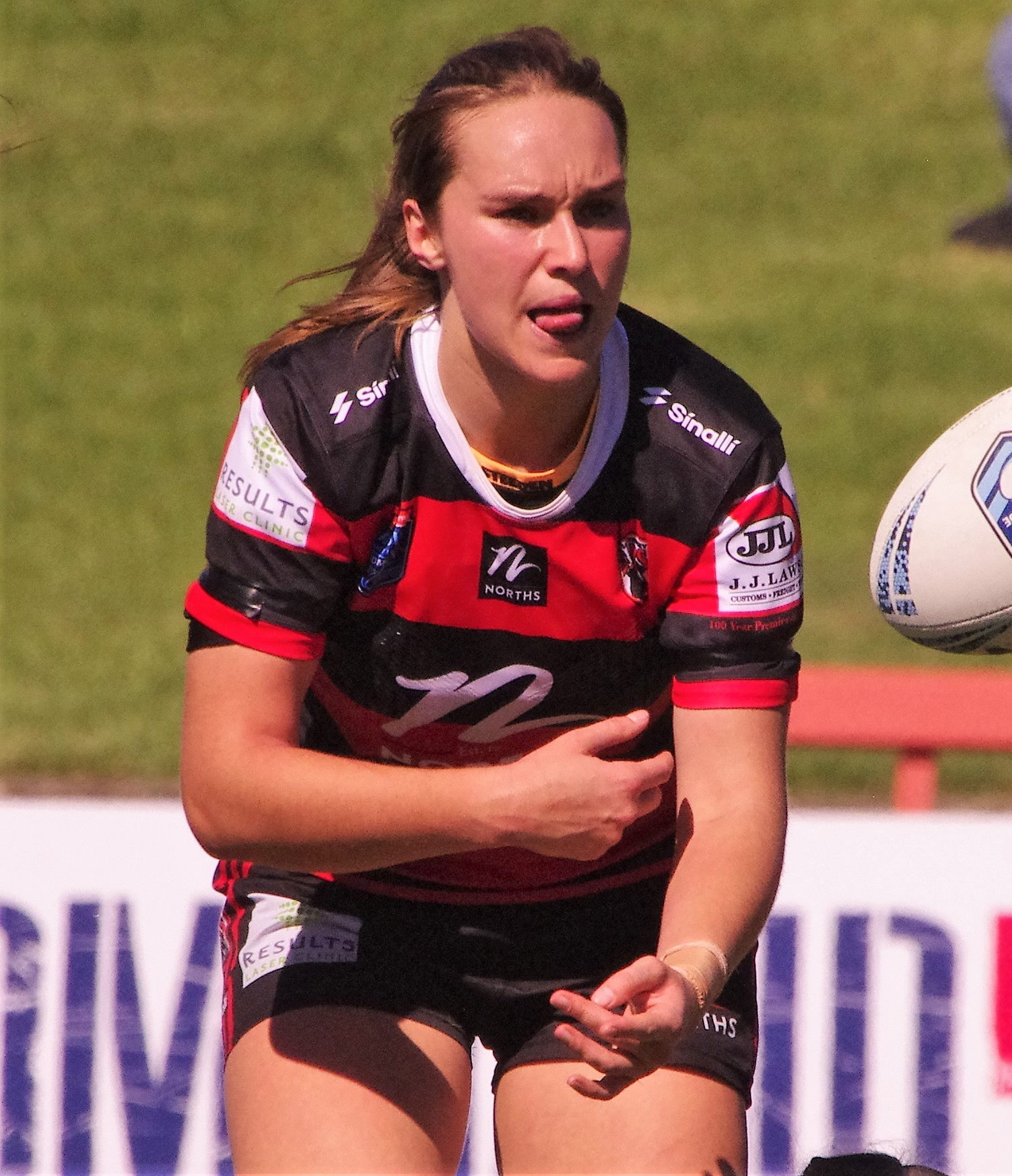
- Dibb in 2021

Personal information
- Born: 23 July 1997 (age 29) North Gosford, New South Wales, Australia
- Height: 180 cm (5 ft 11 in)
- Weight: 77 kg (12 st 2 lb)

Playing information
- Position: Five-eighth
Club
Years	Team	Pld	T	G	FG	P
2019	Sydney Roosters	3	0	4	0	8
2020	New Zealand Warriors	3	1	4	0	12
2021–22	Newcastle Knights	12	1	19	0	42
2023–25	North Qld Cowboys	27	4	58	2	134
2026–	Newcastle Knights	12	2	42	0	92
	Total	57	8	127	2	288
Representative
Years	Team	Pld	T	G	FG	P
2019–22	New South Wales	2	1	1	0	6
2019–25	Prime Minister's XIII	3	0	6	0	12
2019	Australia 9s	3	0	7	0	14
2019	Australia	1	0	0	0	0
2022–25	Indigenous All Stars	4	0	10	0	20
- Source: RLP As of 2 November 2026

Kirra Dibb (born 23 July 1997) is an Australian rugby league footballer who plays five-eighth for the Newcastle Knights in the NRL Women's Premiership.

Primarily a five-eighth, she is an Australian and New South Wales representative. She previously played for the Sydney Roosters, New Zealand Warriors and Newcastle Knights in the NRL Women's Premiership, and the North Sydney Bears in the NSWRL Women's Premiership.

== Background ==
Dibb was born in North Gosford and is a Kincumber Colts junior and is of Indigenous Australian descent. She stopped playing rugby league as a 10-year old as there were no girl's competitions to compete in, instead playing touch football and Oztag.

== Playing career ==
=== 2019 ===
In 2019, Dibb returned to rugby league, joining the North Sydney Bears in the NSWRL Women's Premiership. In May, she represented NSW Country at the Women's National Championships.

On 21 June, she made her debut for New South Wales, starting at five-eighth in their 14–4 win over Queensland. In July, she joined the Sydney Roosters NRL Women's Premiership side. In Round 1 of the 2019 NRL Women's season, she made her debut in a 12–16 loss to the New Zealand Warriors.

In October, Dibb represented three Australian sides – the Prime Minister's XIII in their win over the Fiji Prime Minister's XIII, the Australia 9s team at the 2019 Rugby League World Cup 9s and the Australian Jillaroos in their 28–8 win over New Zealand.

=== 2020 ===
In September, she joined the New Zealand Warriors NRL Women's Premiership side for the 2020 NRL Women's season, playing three games for the club.

=== 2021 ===
On 3 December, Dibb signed with the Newcastle Knights to be a part of their inaugural NRLW squad.

=== 2022 ===
In round 1 of the delayed 2021 NRL Women's season, Dibb made her club debut for the Knights against the Parramatta Eels.

On 24 June, Dibb made her return to the Origin arena starting at five-eighth in a victorious effort. The 20–14 victory featured a 40-metre solo try from Dibb to cap off her successful return to the game's biggest stage.

On 12 September, Dibb was named the Harvey Norman NSW Women's Premiership player of the year following a 2022 campaign that resulted in a Minor Premiership and sudden death finals exit.

On 2 October, Dibb played in the Knights' 2022 NRLW Grand Final win over the Parramatta Eels, kicking a goal in the Knights' 32–12 victory.

=== 2023 ===
On 19 April, Dibb signed a two-year contract with the North Queensland Cowboys. On 28 June, she was named as the inaugural co-captain of the Cowboys, alongside Tallisha Harden.

In Round 1 of the 2023 NRL Women's season, she made her debut for the Cowboys, starting at halfback in a 16–6 loss to the Gold Coast Titans.

=== 2025 ===
In 2025 Dibb alongside fellow co-captain Emma Manzelmann, helped guide the North Queensland Cowboys for their maiden NRLW finals series. They had a home final at Queensland Country Bank Stadium, hosting the Cronulla Sharks, which they lost 18-24.

On 12 October 2025 she played for the Prime Minister's XIII in the 50-0 win over the PNG Orchids in Port Moresby

On 29 October 2025 it was reported that she had signed for Newcastle Knights in the NRL Women's Premiership on a 3-year deal.

== Personal life ==
Dibb studied Exercise Physiology at University. She is in a relationship with Bachelorette Australia contestant Holly Langford.
