= QRL Women's Premiership =

Women's rugby league in Australia

- Current season or competition: 2025 QRL Major Competitions
- Sport: Rugby league
- Instituted: 2019; 7 years ago
- Inaugural season: 2020
- Number of teams: 8
- Country: Australia
- Website: www.qrl.com.au
- Related competition: NRL Women's Premiership; NSWRL Women's Premiership

The QRL Women's Premiership, known as the BMD Premiership due to sponsorship from BMD Group, is the top level of women's rugby league football in Queensland, Australia. Run by the Queensland Rugby League, the competition is Queensland's first statewide open age women's competition.

On 3 March 2021, the QRL announced that the Souths Logan Magpies would not compete in that season's premiership but planned to return in 2022. Valkyries Queensland, a new team made up of players from Souths Logan and other Queensland teams, were named to take their place.

== Teams ==
The QRL Women's Premiership consists of eight teams, five from South East Queensland and one each from North Queensland, Central Queensland and Northern New South Wales. The league operates on a single group system, with no divisions or conferences and no relegation and promotion from other leagues.

=== Current clubs ===
QRL Women's Premiership
Club	Established	Joined	City	Stadium(s)
Brisbane Tigers	1917	2020	Brisbane	Totally Workwear Stadium
Burleigh Bears	1934	2020	Gold Coast	Pizzey Park
Central Queensland Capras	1996	2020	Rockhampton	Browne Park
Mackay Cutters	2007	2023	Mackay	BB Print Stadium
Norths Devils	1933	2023	Nundah	Albert Bishop Park
Souths Logan Magpies	1918	2020	Brisbane	Davies Park
Sunshine Coast Falcons	1996	2024	Sunshine Coast	Sunshine Coast Stadium
Tweed Heads Seagulls	1909	2020	Tweed Heads	Piggabeen Sports Complex
Western Clydesdales	2016	2024	Toowoomba	Clive Berghofer Stadium
Wynnum Manly Seagulls	1951	2022	Wynnum	Kougari Oval

Note: Souths Logan Magpies did not field a team in the 2021 season.

=== Previous clubs ===
QRL Women's Premiership
Club	First season	Last season	City	Stadium(s)
Ipswich Brothers	2020	2020	Ipswich	Blue Ribbon Motors Field
North Queensland Gold Stars	2019	2022	Townsville	Jack Manski Oval
Valkyries Queensland	2021	2021	Brisbane	Davies Park
Valleys Diehards	2021	2021	Brisbane	Emerson Park
West Brisbane Panthers	2020	2022	Brisbane	Frank Lind Oval

== Grand Finals ==
=== 2021 ===
6 June 2021	Burleigh Bears	24–20	Valley Diehards	Totally Workwear Stadium, Brisbane
	Tries: 5 Tamika Upton 2 (5' 66'); Jetaya Faifua 2 (31', 62'); Tazmin Gray (27'); Goals: 2 Lauren Brown 2/5 (28' 68')	[HT 14–8; Match Stats (QRL; Report Report]	Tries: 4 Shenae Ciesiolka (2'); Savannah Pratten (34'); Ali Brigginshaw (37'); Sarah Riordan (40'); Goals: Brianna Clark (38'); Ali Brigginshaw (42')	Referee: Glen Stewart; Player of the Match: Zahara Temara

=== 2022 ===
4 June 2022	North Queensland Gold Stars	14–12	Central Queensland Capras	Moreton Daily Stadium, Redcliffe
	Tries: 3 Alicia Martin (4'); Jasmine Peters (10'); Shaniah Power (69'); Goals: 1 Romy Teitzel 1/3 (11')	[HT 6–10; Match Stats (QRL); Report Report]	Tries: 2 Tyla Mitchell (19'); Emmanita Paki (42'); Goals: 2 Mariah Storch 2/2 (20', 43')	Player of the Match: Emma Manzelmann

=== 2023 ===
13 May 2023	Burleigh Bears	24–10	Wynnum-Manly Seagulls	Logan Metro Football Fields, Logan
	Tries: 4 Chelsea Lenarduzzi 2 (51', 56'); Tazmin Gray (5'); Sienna Laing (20'); Goals: 4 Zahara Temara 4 (7', 22', 53', 57')	[HT 12–6; Match Stats (QRL); Report Report]	Tries: 2 Kimberley Hunt 2 (29', 48'); Goals: 1 Brianna Clark 1/2 (31')	Player of the Match: Zahara Temara

=== 2024 ===
25 May 2024	Mackay Cutters	16–6	Norths Devils	Kayo Stadium, Redcliffe
2:00 PM	Tries: 3 Sareka Mooka {22'} Alisha Foord {25'} Jasmine Peters (28'); Goals: 2 Kayla Shepherd 2/4 (26', 63' pen)	[HT 14–6; Match Stats (QRL); Report Report]	Tries: 1 Montaya Hudson (33'); Goals: 1 Georgia Hannaway 1/1 (34')	Referee: Tori Wilkie; Player of the Match: Lily Peacock

== Player of the Year ==
Season	Player	Position	Club	Ref
2021	Romy Teitzel	Fullback	North Queensland Gold Stars	
2022	Mariah Denman	Prop	Central Queensland Capras	
2023	Shaniah Power	Second-row	Wynnum-Manly Seagulls	

== See also ==
- Queensland Rugby League
- Women's rugby league in Australia
- Women's rugby league
- Rugby League Competitions in Australia
