= 2026 NRL Women's season squads =

Australian rugby league players

The 2026 NRL Women's Premiership comprised 12 competing teams. Starting squad size was 24 players on contract with a further 4 players on development contracts and 2 players of supplementary contracts. Squad size could grow above these initial limits subject to the approval of the administrative body, the National Rugby League, to cover contracted players who sustained season-ending injuries of became unavailable due to pregnancy.

Approval for replacements into the squad could be sought for injured players who were on multi-year contracts, including for injuries carried over from the 2025 NRLW season or 2025 Pacific Championships. Similarly, a club could seek approval to replace a player injured in pre-season training or a trial match.

The 12 clubs in total used 291 players. Each club used between 21 and 26 players. The number of players making their NRLW debut in the 2026 season was 52. By club this ranged from one (Canberra Raiders, St George Illawarra Dragons Women, and Sydney Roosters) to nine (North Queensland Cowboys) debutants.

During the season, 607 tries were scored by 178 individual players. So, 61.17% of players scored at least one try. A tally of 372 goals were kicked by 21 players, with four of the twelve teams having a single successful goalkicker. Four field-goals were kicked during the season.

Statistics are drawn from match centres on the NRL website.

== Key ==
- Age is at 13 September 2026, the last day of the regular season (Round 11).
- Position(s) are those played during the season. Players who made appearances only off the interchange bench are listed with the position or positions played when they took the field.
- In the NRLW Career columns:
  - S is the number of NRLW seasons played.
  - M is the number of NRLW matches played at the end of the 2025 season.
- in the 2026 Reps columns:
  - The Int'l column includes matches in the World Cup and other internationals.
    - The number to the right of the flag indicates the number of matches played.
    - A zero (0) indicates the player was included in an international squad but did not play in a match during 2026.
  - The Origin series consisted on 3 matches played on April 30, May 14 and 28, 2026.
    - New South Wales
    - Queensland
    - The number to the right of the icon indicates the number of matches played. A zero (0) indicates the player was included in an Origin squad but did not play in the 2026 series.
  - Other includes the All Stars match, the Prime Minister's XIII match and the Under 19 State of Origin match
    - 1 indicates an appearance for the Indigenous All Stars.
    - 1 indicates an appearance for the Māori All Stars.
    - 1 indicates an appearance for the Australian Prime Minister's XIII Women's team.
    - 1 indicates an appearance for the Papua New Guinea Prime Minister's XIII Women's team.
    - U indicates an appearance for the New South Wales Under 19 State of Origin team.
    - U indicates an appearance for the Queensland Under 19 State of Origin team.

== Brisbane Broncos ==
The Brisbane Broncos were coached by Scott Prince. Tamika Upton was appointed captain.

Jersey numbers in the table reflect the Broncos' Grand Final team list.

J#	Player	Age	Position(s)	NRLW Career			Past Seasons 2018-25	2026 NRLW					2026 Reps
J#	Player	Age	Position(s)	Debut	S	M	Past Seasons 2018-25	M	T	G	F	Pts	Int'l	Origin	Other
1	Tamika Upton	29	Fullback	2019	8	64	24 26	14	15	0	0	60	5	2	—
2	Kerri Johnson	23	Wing	2025	2	26	13	13	11	0	0	44	—	—	—
3	Deleni Paitai	18	Centre	2026	1	11	—	11	2	0	0	8	—	—	U
4	Georgia Bartlett	—	Centre, Five-eighth, Wing	2026	1	14	—	14	6	0	0	24	—	—	—
5	Julia Robinson	28	Centre, Wing	2018	9	60	46	14	8	0	0	32	2	2	—
6	Ali Brigginshaw	36	Five-eighth	2018	9	67	56	11	1	1	0	6	—	—	—
7	Jesse Southwell	21	Halfback	2022	5	54	40	14	2	56	0	120	2	3	—
8	Shannon Mato	28	Prop	2020	6	45	4 27	14	1	0	0	4	4	—	—
9	Jada Ferguson	24	Hooker	2021	6	52	39	13	2	0	0	8	—	3	—
10	Brianna Clark	31	Prop	2020	7	49	2 4 31	12	1	0	0	4	1	2	—
11	Lauren Dam	29	Second-row	2021	5	44	2 28	14	7	0	0	28	—	—	—
12	Romy Teitzel	27	Second-row	2020	7	59	33 12	14	4	0	0	16	—	3	—
13	Lillian Yarrow	22	Lock, Prop	2024	3	28	15	13	0	0	0	0	—	—	—
14	Rhemy Hinckesman	—	Hooker	2026	1	12	—	12	2	0	0	8	—	—	—
15	Chelsea Lenarduzzi	30	Prop	2018	9	69	55	14	6	0	0	24	—	1	—
16	Reegan Hicks	20	Prop	2025	2	11	4	7	0	0	0	0	—	—	—
17	Harlem Walker	18	Prop, Lock	2026	1	10	—	10	2	0	0	8	—	—	U
18	Caitlin Urwin	26	Wing	2026	1	8	—	8	2	0	0	8	—	—	—
19	Tara McGrath-West	25	Lock	2022	4	17	13 3	1	0	0	0	0	—	—	—
20	Linneke Gevers	28	Second-row, Prop	—	0	0	—	0	0	0	0	0	—	—	—
21	Breanna Eales	35	Prop, Lock	2023	3	18	4 14	0	0	0	0	0	—	—	—
22	Amanii Misa	19	Prop, Second-row	—	0	0	—	0	0	0	0	0	—	—	U
–	Skyla Adams	21	Five-eighth, Centre	2024	2	3	3	0	0	0	0	0	—	—	—
–	Azalleyah Maaka	26	Centre	2025	1	2	2	0	0	0	0	0	—	—	—
–	Tavarna Papalii	21	Hooker	2024	2	9	8	1	0	0	0	0	3	—	—
–	Lila Parr	18	Five-eighth, Centre	—	0	0	—	0	0	0	0	0	—	—	—
IJ	Destiny Brill	23	Hooker	2021	6	43	6 6 29	2	0	0	0	0	—	3	—
IJ	Bree Spreadborough	27	Lock	2024	3	19	7	12	1	0	0	4	—	—	—
DV	Tia Molo	18	Centre	—	0	0	—	0	0	0	0	0	3	—	U
IS	Shalom Sauaso	18	Lock, Centre	2025	1	10	10	0	0	0	0	0	—	—	—
P	Hayley Maddick	34	Wing, Fullback	2021	5	42	42	0	0	0	0	0	—	—	—

Notes:

- Hayley Maddick missed the 2026 season due to her pregnancy.
- Two players were signed on a supplementary contract in 2026:
  - Linneke Gevers
  - Rhemy Hinckesman
- Four players were on a development contract in 2026:
  - Breanna Eales
  - Tia Molo
  - Deleni Paitai
  - Lila Parr
- Supplementary contract player Rhemy Hinckesman was named on the interchange bench in the Round 1 team. Linneke Gevers and Deleni Paitai were named amongst the five reserves.

The Brisbane Broncos announced contract extensions in several instalments from August 2025. The Brisbane Broncos announced player signings in several instalments from October 2025.

== Canberra Raiders ==
The Canberra Raiders were coached by Darrin Borthwick.Simaima Taufa and Zahara Temara were appointed joint captains. Temara made thirteen and Taufa made ten appearances of the thirteen matches played by the Raiders.

Jersey numbers in the table reflect the team list announced for Finals Week 2.

J#	Player	Age	Position(s)	NRLW Career			Past Seasons 2018-25	2026 NRLW					2026 Reps
J#	Player	Age	Position(s)	Debut	S	M	Past Seasons 2018-25	M	T	G	F	Pts	Int'l	Origin	Other
1	Sheridan Gallagher	24	Fullback	2023	4	45	32	13	3	7	0	26	1	—	—
2	Isabella Waterman	26	Centre, Wing	2024	3	17	1 7	9	5	0	0	20	4	—	—
3	Leianne Tufuga	24	Centre	2021	6	52	12 16 11	13	4	0	0	16	4	—	—
4	Bobbi Law	29	Centre	2019	8	36	2 11 15	8	3	0	0	12	—	—	—
5	Mackenzie Wiki	24	Wing	2023	4	36	23	13	10	0	0	40	4	—	—
6	Krystal Blackwell	23	Five-eighth	2023	4	40	27	13	4	0	0	16	—	—	1
7	Zahara Temara	29	Halfback	2018	9	65	24 28	13	0	25	1	51	2	—	1
8	Chloe Saunders	27	Prop	2023	4	42	18 11	13	0	0	0	0	—	—	—
9	Chanté Temara	25	Hooker	2020	6	45	2 1 29	13	1	0	0	4	—	—	1
10	Sophie Holyman	28	Prop	2022	5	47	5 29	13	3	0	0	12	—	—	—
11	Jordyn Preston	23	Second-row	2024	3	25	2 11	12	3	0	0	12	—	—	—
12	Charlotte Basham	21	Second-row	2022	4	29	17	12	3	0	0	12	—	—	—
13	Hollie-Mae Dodd	23	Lock, Second-row	2023	4	33	21	12	2	0	0	8	3	—	—
14	Emma Barnes	22	Hooker	2023	4	37	24	13	0	0	0	0	—	—	—
15	Grace Kemp	25	Prop, Lock, Second-row	2023	4	39	26	13	2	0	0	8	—	—	1
16	Lili Boyle	21	Lock	2025	2	11	7	4	0	0	0	0	—	—	—
17	Grace Kukutai	29	Prop, Lock, Second-row	2024	3	24	11	13	1	0	0	4	—	—	—
18	Ellie Brander	18	Prop	2026	1	1	—	1	0	0	0	0	—	—	—
19	Elise Simpson	19	Wing	2025	2	18	9	9	8	0	0	32	—	—	—
20	Sereana Naitokatoka	25	Hooker	2021	5	29	4 9 15	1	0	0	0	0	4	—	—
21	Madison Bartlett	31	Wing	2019	7	40	5 6 5 24	0	0	0	0	0	—	—	—
22	Relna Wuruki-Hosea	20	Wing, Centre	2024	2	6	6	0	0	0	0	0	3	—	—
–	Aaliyah Lomas	22	Lock	—	0	0	—	0	0	0	0	0	—	—	—
–	Evie McGrath	20	Fullback, Five-eighth	2024	2	9	9	0	0	0	0	0	—	—	—
–	Madyson Tooth	24	Centre	—	0	0	—	0	0	0	0	0	—	—	—
S	Simaima Taufa	32	Lock	2018	9	59	9 12 28	10	2	0	0	8	4	—	—
DV	Marley Cardwell	21	Prop	2025	1	2	2	0	0	0	0	0	—	—	—
DV	Isabella Piper	19	Lock	—	0	0	—	0	0	0	0	0	—	—	—
DV	Gabriella Savage	18	Centre	—	0	0	—	0	0	0	0	0	—	—	U
–	Holly Williams	18	Wing	—	0	0	—	0	0	0	0	0	—	—	—

Notes:

- Two players were signed on a supplementary contact for 2026.
  - Evie McGrath
  - Aaliyah Lomas
- Three players were signed on a development contract for 2026.
  - Marley Cardwell
  - Isabella Piper
  - Gabriella Savage
- In late May 2026, Monalisa Soliola withdrew from the 2026 season at her own request.

The Canberra Raiders announced the release of seven players in late November 2025. The Raiders announced player signings in several instalments from December 2025. The Raiders announced contract extensions in several instalments from January 2026.

== Canterbury-Bankstown Bulldogs ==
The Canterbury-Bankstown Bulldogs were coached by Brayden Wiliame.Tayla Preston and Angelina Teakaraanga-Katoa were appointed joint captains. Both Preston and Teakaraanga-Katoa appeared in all eleven matches played by the Bulldogs.

Jersey numbers in the table reflect the team list announced for Round 11.

J#	Player	Age	Position(s)	NRLW Career			Past Seasons 2018-25	2026 NRLW					2026 Reps
J#	Player	Age	Position(s)	Debut	S	M	Past Seasons 2018-25	M	T	G	F	Pts	Int'l	Origin	Other
1	Shanthie Lui	18	Fullback	2026	1	1	—	1	0	0	0	0	—	—	—
2	Simina Lokotui	20	Wing, Centre	2025	2	17	7	10	9	0	0	36	1	—	—
3	Daynah Nankivell	25	Centre	2026	1	10	—	10	1	0	0	4	—	—	—
4	Monica Tagoai	27	Centre	2025	2	18	8	10	9	0	0	36	4	—	—
5	Elizabeth MacGregor	19	Wing	2025	2	17	8	9	3	0	0	12	—	—	—
6	Andie Robinson	24	Fullback, Five-eighth	2022	4	33	5 6 11	11	3	0	0	12	—	—	1
7	Tayla Preston	26	Halfback	2022	5	48	6 20 11	11	0	17	0	34	3	—	1
8	Kalosipani Hopoate	22	Prop	2022	5	43	24 10	9	0	0	0	0	1	—	—
9	Mary-Jane Taito	18	Hooker	2026	1	11	—	11	0	0	0	0	4	—	—
10	Alexis Tauaneai	21	Prop, Lock	2023	4	35	16 8	11	2	0	0	8	5	—	—
11	Leilani Wilson	23	Second-row, Lock, Prop	2026	1	11	—	11	0	0	0	0	4	—	—
12	Pauline Suli-Ruka	20	Second-row	2025	2	9	5	4	0	0	0	0	—	—	—
13	Angelina Teakaraanga-Katoa	24	Lock, Second-row, Prop	2022	5	40	1 18 10	11	0	0	0	0	5	—	—
14	Evelyn Roberts	18	Hooker	2026	1	9	—	9	2	0	0	8	1	—	—
15	Latisha Smythe	22	Lock, Prop	2025	2	16	7	9	0	0	0	0	4	—	—
16	Hope Millard	21	Lock	2025	2	17	6	11	2	0	0	8	2	—	—
17	Ma’atuleio Fotu-Moala	27	Prop	2024	3	15	6 4	5	2	0	0	8	—	—	—
18	Bridget Hoy	27	Wing	2024	3	8	1 4	3	1	0	0	4	—	—	—
19	Moana Courtenay	26	Wing, Centre	2025	2	12	10	2	0	0	0	0	—	—	—
20	Waimarie Martin	21	Hooker	—	0	0	—	0	0	0	0	0	—	—	—
21	Giovanna Suani	18	Prop	2026	1	5	—	5	0	0	0	0	—	—	—
22	Paea Uilou	20	Lock, Prop	2025	2	8	4	4	0	0	0	0	1	—	—
–	Tamika Jones	23	Second-row	2026	1	8	—	8	1	0	0	4	1	—	—
–	Shaquaylah Mahakitau-Monschau	20	Five-eighth	2025	2	4	3	1	0	0	0	0	—	—	—
–	Evah McEwen	20	Second-row, Centre	2024	2	11	11	0	0	0	0	0	—	—	—
–	Leteena Medland	18	Prop	—	0	0	—	0	0	0	0	0	—	—	—
–	Ambryn Murphy-Haua	—	Five-eighth, Halfback	—	0	0	—	0	0	0	0	0	—	—	—
–	Ebony Prior	24	Hooker	2023	4	26	13 11	2	0	0	0	0	—	—	—
–	Ashleigh Quinlan	31	Five-eighth	2022	5	42	6 17 10	9	0	0	0	0	5	—	1
DV	Aliahana Fuimaono	18	Second-row	—	0	0	—	0	0	0	0	0	—	—	—
DV	Milahn Ieremia	19	Wing	—	0	0	—	0	0	0	0	0	—	—	—
DV	Olivia Va'alele	18	Halfback	—	0	0	—	0	0	0	0	0	—	—	—
–	Anneka Wilson	23	Hooker, Halfback	2025	1	9	9	0	0	0	0	0	—	—	—

- Two players were signed on a supplementary contact for 2026. Both players were named amongst the 17 players selected for Round 1.
  - Giovanna Suani
  - Leilani Wilson
- Four players were signed on a development contract for 2026:
  - Aliahana Fuimaono
  - Leteena Medland
  - Milahn Ieremia
  - Olivia Va'alele
- Evelyn Roberts played for Canterbury in the Lisa Fiaola Cup (Under 17) competition in 2024 and 2025 and Tarsha Gale Cup (Under 19) competition in early 2026. Roberts played for the Brisbane Tigers in the open-age BMD Premiership in 2025 and won the Steph Hancock Medal for the competition's best and fairest player.
- Mary-Jane Taito played for Canterbury in the Tarsha Gale Cup (Under 19) competition in 2025 and early 2026.

The Bulldogs announced player signings in several instalments from early February 2026. The Bulldogs announced contract extensions from May 2026.

== Cronulla-Sutherland Sharks ==
The Cronulla-Sutherland Sharks were coached by Tony Herman.

Jersey numbers in the table reflect the team list announced for Round 11.

J#	Player	Age	Position(s)	NRLW Career			Past Seasons 2018-25	2026 NRLW					2026 Reps
J#	Player	Age	Position(s)	Debut	S	M	Past Seasons 2018-25	M	T	G	F	Pts	Int'l	Origin	Other
1	Jada Taylor	23	Fullback	2022	5	26	1 14	11	3	0	0	12	—	—	1 1
2	Cassie Staples	33	Wing, Centre	2022	5	40	1 29	10	3	0	0	12	4	—	—
3	Tiana Penitani Gray	30	Centre	2019	8	56	6 10 32	8	2	0	0	8	4	1	—
4	Annessa Biddle	24	Centre	2023	4	32	26	6	0	0	0	0	4	—	—
5	Georgia Ravics	32	Wing	2023	4	35	28	7	5	0	0	20	—	—	—
6	Madison Higgins-Ashby	25	Centre, Five-eighth, Halfback	2026	1	11	—	11	0	0	0	0	—	—	—
7	Chantay Kiria-Ratu	21	Halfback, Five-eighth	2023	3	33	11 13	9	2	18	0	44	3	3	—
8	Ellie Johnston	25	Prop	2020	7	58	3 12 33	10	1	0	0	4	3	3	—
9	Quincy Dodd	26	Hooker	2019	8	55	5 13 27	10	4	0	0	16	2	—	1
10	Manilita Takapautolo	20	Second-row, Prop, Lock	2024	3	31	20	11	0	0	0	0	1	—	—
11	Talei Holmes	26	Second-row	2020	7	46	10 32	4	0	0	0	0	4	—	—
12	China Polata	24	Second-row, Centre	2021	5	27	1 17	9	1	0	0	4	1	—	1
13	Anne-Marie Kiria-Ratu	20	Lock, Second-row	2025	2	19	9	10	0	0	0	0	—	—	—
14	Georgia Hannaway	25	Five-eighth	2024	3	29	20	9	3	4	0	20	—	—	1
15	Stephanie Faulkner	21	Prop	2025	2	14	11	3	1	0	0	4	—	—	—
16	Caitlan Johnston-Green	25	Prop	2019	7	37	3 20 3	11	1	0	0	4	—	—	1
17	Jacinta Carter	22	Prop	2023	4	19	3 8	8	1	0	0	4	—	—	1
18	Tegan Dymock	24	Lock	2021	6	39	6 19 5	9	0	0	0	0	—	—	—
19	Filomina Hanisi	25	Lock, Prop	2020	7	27	4 12 4 5	2	0	0	0	0	—	—	—
20	Olivia Herman	21	Hooker	2026	1	1	—	1	0	0	0	0	—	—	—
21	Milla Elaro	21	Wing	2026	1	4	—	4	4	0	0	16	—	—	—
22	Koffi Brookfield	19	Hooker	2026	1	4	—	4	0	0	0	0	—	—	—
–	Leilani Ahsam	20	Prop	—	0	0	—	0	0	0	0	0	4	—	—
–	Marewakiterangi Samson	21	Wing	2026	1	3	—	3	1	0	0	4	—	—	—
–	Nanise Vakacavu	21	Prop	—	0	0	—	0	0	0	0	0	2	—	—
IJ	Rhiannon Byers	27	Second-row, Centre	2023	4	23	18	5	2	0	0	8	—	—	1
IJ	Jaydika Tafua	20	Second-row	2025	2	16	9	7	2	0	0	8	1	—	—
IJ	Courtney Tyrell	19	Wing	—	0	0	—	0	0	0	0	0	—	—	—
IS	Najvada George	27	Lock	2019	6	36	3 6 18 4	5	0	0	0	0	—	—	—
IS	Genevieve Mafi	19	Prop	—	0	0	—	0	0	0	0	0	—	—	—
IS	Grace-Lee Weekes	22	Centre, Wing	2025	1	8	8	0	0	0	0	0	—	—	—
P	Emma Verran	31	Five-eighth, Fullback	2021	5	43	13 30	0	0	0	0	0	—	—	—
P	Tyla King	32	Five-eighth, Fullback	2023	3	21	13 8	0	0	0	0	0	—	—	—

Notes:

- Two players were signed on a supplementary contact for 2026.
  - Koffi Brookfield
  - Leilani Ahsam
- Four players were signed on a development contract for 2026:
  - Olivia Herman
  - Courtney Tyrell
  - Genevieve Mafi
  - Marewakiterangi Samson
- Emma Verran missed the 2026 season due to her pregnancy.

The Cronulla Sutherland Sharks announced contract extensions in several instalments from November 2025. The Cronulla Sutherland Sharks announced player signings in several instalments from November 2025.

== Gold Coast Titans ==
The Gold Coast Titans were coached by Karyn Murphy.

Jersey numbers in the table reflect the team list announced for Finals Week 1.

J#	Player	Age	Position(s)	NRLW Career			Past Seasons 2018-25	2026 NRLW					2026 Reps
J#	Player	Age	Position(s)	Debut	S	M	Past Seasons 2018-25	M	T	G	F	Pts	Int'l	Origin	Other
1	Lily Patston	25	Fullback	2025	2	15	4	11	2	0	0	8	—	—	—
2	Destiny Mino-Sinapati	21	Wing, Fullback	2023	3	17	13	4	6	0	0	24	4	1	—
3	Jaime Chapman	24	Centre	2020	7	47	9 5 22	11	9	0	0	36	5	3	1
4	Georgia Grey	21	Wing, Centre	2024	3	28	19	9	7	0	0	28	—	—	—
5	Indie Bostock	19	Wing	2025	2	18	7	11	8	0	0	32	—	—	—
6	Teagan Levi	23	Five-eighth	2026	1	12	—	12	9	0	0	36	—	—	—
7	Lauren Brown	31	Halfback	2020	7	57	10 35	12	1	39	0	82	—	3	—
8	Laikha Clarke	24	Prop	2021	6	41	29	12	3	0	0	12	4	—	1
9	Georgia Hale	31	Hooker	2018	9	62	9 41	12	0	0	0	0	5	—	—
10	Fanua Rimoni	19	Prop	2026	1	9	—	9	0	0	0	0	4	—	—
11	Evania Isa'ako	31	Second-row, Wing	2020	6	45	3 30	12	8	0	0	32	4	—	—
12	Ivana Lolesio	22	Second-row	2025	2	24	12	12	2	0	0	8	4	3	—
13	Sienna Lofipo	21	Lock	2023	4	36	24	12	2	0	0	8	—	4	—
14	Lily Kolc	21	Hooker	2024	3	29	18	11	1	0	0	4	—	—	—
15	Eta Sikahele	19	Prop	2026	1	9	—	9	0	0	0	0	1	—	—
20	Jasmine Solia	29	Second-row	2022	5	32	14 11	7	0	0	0	0	2	—	—
17	Takoda Thompson	20	Second-row	2025	2	22	10	12	1	0	0	4	—	—	—
18	Pauline Piliae-Rasabale	34	Prop	2023	4	25	18 6	1	0	0	0	0	4	—	—
19	Aleksandra Tunufai	21	Centre	2026	1	1	—	1	0	0	0	0	—	—	—
16	Sarina Masaga	21	Centre	2024	3	17	11	6	1	0	0	4	1	—	—
21	Enah Desic	18	Prop	2026	1	1	—	1	0	0	0	0	—	—	U
22	Jessika Elliston	28	Prop	2019	8	49	5 43	1	0	0	0	0	—	3	—
–	Sienna Ibrahim	19	Wing	2026	1	1	—	1	2	0	0	8	—	—	U
–	Lorren Ieli	19	Second-row	—	0	0	—	0	0	0	0	0	4	—	U
–	Rilee Jorgensen	21	Second-row, Prop	2023	2	12	12	0	0	0	0	0	—	—	—
–	Lailani Montgomery	21	Lock	2024	3	16	15	1	0	0	0	0	—	—	1
–	Natasha Penitani	26	Prop, Lock, Second-row	2024	3	26	9 12	5	0	0	0	0	—	—	—
–	Keira Rangi	19	Second-row	—	0	0	—	0	0	0	0	0	1	—	U
IJ	Phoenix-Raine Hippi	20	Centre, Wing	2025	2	17	7	10	6	0	0	24	—	1	1
DV	Lilianah Lewis	—	Halfback	—	0	0	—	0	0	0	0	0	—	—	U
DV	Joshalynn Walker	18	Fullback	—	0	0	—	0	0	0	0	0	—	—	—
–	Torah Luadaka	18	Halfback	—	0	0	—	0	0	0	0	0	—	—	U

Notes:

- Lily Patston was signed on a supplementary contact for 2026.
- Five players were signed on a development contract for 2026:
  - Enah Desic
  - Torah Luadaka
  - Keira Rangi
  - Joshalynn Walker
  - Sienna Ibrahim
- Te Ngaroahiahi Fanua Awhina Rimoni was initially signed on a development contract for 2026 but was upgraded in late March to a full contract.

The Gold Coast Titans announced contract extensions in several instalments from October 2025. The Gold Coast Titans announced player signings in several instalments from March 2026.
