= 2023 Women's State of Origin =

Rugby league series

- Won by: Queensland
- Series margin: 1–1
- Points scored: 60
- Attendance: 31,247 (ave. 15,624 per match)
- Player of the series: Tazmin Gray (Nellie Doherty Medal)
- Top points scorer(s): Emily Bass; Tiana Penitani; Julia Robinson; Jesse Southwell; (8 points each)
- Top try scorer(s): Emily Bass; Tiana Penitani; Julia Robinson; (2 tries each)

The 2023 Women's State of Origin Series was the sixth official Women's State of Origin rugby league series between New South Wales and Queensland. It was the first time in Women's State of Origin history that it was a series rather than a one-off game. The first game was played at Parramatta's Commbank Stadium on 2 June 2022 and the second was played at Townsville's Queensland Country Bank Stadium. The teams have played each other annually since 1999 with the 2023 series being the sixth played under the State of Origin banner. Queensland were crowned champions having scored four more points than New South Wales as the teams won a game each in the two-game series.

== Game I ==
Game I was held at Commbank Stadium in Parramatta.

New South Wales were heavy favourites leading into the match, yet a well played Queensland side helped cause an upset for New South Wales at home.

Thursday, 1 June
19:45 AEST (UTC+10:00)

New South Wales	10–18	Queensland
Tries: Sergis 16'; Chapman 50'; Goals: Southwell 1/2 18'	1st: 6–10; 2nd: 4–8; Match stats (NRL); Report	Tries: Robinson 7', 45'; Gray 32'; Bass 40'; Goals: Temara 1/4 34'

Commbank Stadium, Sydney
Attendance: 12,972
Referee: Adam Gee
Bunker: Kasey Badger
Touch judges: Dave Munro, Belinda Sharpe

Team lists:

FB	1	Emma Tonegato
WG	2	Yasmin Clydsdale
CE	3	Jessica Sergis
CE	4	Isabelle Kelly (C)
WG	5	Tiana Penitani
FE	6	Jesse Southwell
HB	7	Rachael Pearson
PR	8	Kezie Apps
HK	9	Keeley Davis
PR	10	Millie Boyle
SR	11	Olvia Kernick
SR	12	Yasmine Clysdale
LK	13	Kennedy Cherrington
Substitutes:
IC	14	Taliah Fuimaono
IC	15	Sarah Togatuki
IC	16	Brooke Anderson
IC	17	Shaylee Bent
18th Man:
RE	18	Ellie Johnston
Coach: Kylie Hilder

FB	1	Tamika Upton
WG	2	Julia Robinson
CE	3	Shenae Ciesiolka
CE	4	Evania Pelite
WG	5	Emily Bass
FE	6	Tarryn Aiken
HB	7	Zahara Temara
PR	8	Shannon Mato
HK	9	Destiny Brill
PR	10	Keilee Joseph
SR	11	Tazmin Gray
SR	12	Shaniah Power
LK	13	Ali Brigginshaw (c)
Substitutes:
IC	14	Emma Manzelmann
IC	15	Jessika Elliston
IC	16	Sophie Holyman
IC	17	Romy Teitzel
18th Man:
RE	18	China Polata
Coach: Tahnee Norris

== Game II ==
Game II was held at Queensland Country Bank Stadium in Townsville.

Thursday, 22 June

Queensland	14–18	New South Wales
Tries: Upton 17'; Bass 25'; Aiken 27'; Goals: Temara 1/3 29'	1st: 14–6; 2nd: 0–12; Match stats (NRL); Report	Tries: Penitani 3', 40'; Clydsdale 68'; Goals: Southwell 3/5 10 (pen)', 45 (pen)', 69'

Queensland Country Bank Stadium, Townsville
Attendance: 18,275
Referee: Belinda Sharpe
Bunker: Kasey Badger
Touch judges: Darian Furner, Wayne Raymond

== Teams ==
=== New South Wales Blues ===
Position	Game 1	Game 2
Fullback	CRO: Emma Tonegato	
Wing	GCT: Jaime Chapman	
Centre	SYD: Isabelle Kelly (c)	SYD: Jessica Sergis
Centre	GCT: Taliah Fuimaono	SYD: Isabelle Kelly (c)
Wing	SYD: Jessica Sergis	PAR: Tiana Penitani
Five-eighth	NEW: Jesse Southwell	GCT: Taliah Fuimaono
Halfback	PAR: Rachael Pearson	NEW: Jesse Southwell
Prop	SYD: Millie Boyle	WTI: Kezie Apps
Hooker	SYD: Keeley Davis	
Prop	PAR: Kennedy Cherrington	SYD: Millie Boyle
Second row	SYD: Olivia Kernick	
Second row	NEW: Yasmin Clydsdale	
Lock	CRO: Brooke Anderson	CAN: Simaima Taufa
Interchange	WTI: Kezie Apps (c)	CRO: Quincy Dodd
Interchange	WTI: Sarah Togatuki	PAR: Kennedy Cherrington
Interchange	CRO: Quincy Dodd	WTI: Sarah Togatuki
Interchange	GCT: Shaylee Bent	
Replacement	CRO: Ellie Johnston	PAR: Cassey Tohi-Hiku
Reserve	SGI: Teagan Berry	CRO: Brooke Anderson
Coach	Kylie Hilder	

Notes:

- Squad lists:
- Isabelle Kelly and Kezie Apps were named as co-captains.
- Tiana Penitani was named on the wing but was withdrawn on the morning of the first match due to a hamstring injury.
- The starting line-up was also amended with Apps dropping to the bench, Cherrington moving from lock to prop and Anderson starting at lock.
- The order that interchange players took the field in game one was: Apps (13'), Togatuki (23'), Dodd (55') and Bent (also 55').

=== Queensland Maroons ===
Position	Game 1	Game 2
Fullback	NEW: Tamika Upton	
Wing	BRI: Julia Robinson	NQL: China Polata
Centre	BRI: Shenae Ciesiolka	
Centre	GCT: Evania Pelite	
Wing	GCT: Emily Bass	
Five-eighth	SYD: Tarryn Aiken	
Halfback	CAN: Zahara Temara	
Prop	GCT: Shannon Mato	
Hooker	BRI: Destiny Brill	
Prop	SYD: Keilee Joseph	
Second row	BRI: Tazmin Gray	
Second row	NQL: Shaniah Power	BRI: Romy Teitzel
Lock	BRI: Ali Brigginshaw (c)	
Interchange	NQL: Emma Manzelmann	
Interchange	GCT: Jessika Elliston	
Interchange	CAN: Sophie Holyman	
Interchange	BRI: Romy Teitzel	NQL: Shaniah Power
Replacement	NQL: China Polata	NQL: Tallisha Harden
Reserve	NQL: Makenzie Weale	GCT: Sienna Lofipo
Coach	Tahnee Norris	

Notes:

- Squad lists:

== Under-19s ==
The Under-19s match was played as a double-header with the Men's Under-19s match.

=== Match summary ===
Thursday, 13 July 2023
5.45pm (AEST)

Queensland	20–14	New South Wales
Tries: Skyla Adams 4'; Destiny Mino-Sinapati 43'; Emily Bella 46'; Libby Surha 50'	NRL stats Report	Tries: Chelsea Makira 15', 55'; Grace-Lee Weekes 27'

Kayo Stadium, Brisbane
Attendance: 4,764
Referee: Rochelle Tamarua
Player of the Match: Rilee Jorgensen

=== Teams ===
Queensland	Position	New South Wales
GCT: Destiny Mino-Sinapati	Fullback	Sienna Williams: NSB
GCT: Sienna Laing	Wing	Grace-Lee Weekes: NSB
NQL: Libby Surha	Centre	Litia Fusi: CBY
BRI: Skyla Adams	Centre	Lindsay Tui: PAR
NQL: Ebony Raftstrand-Smith	Wing	Georgia Willey: CAN
GCT: Chantay Kiria-Ratu	Five-Eighth	Brooke Talataina: SYD
GCT: Sienna Lofipo (c)	Halfback	Evie Jones: NEW
NQL: Shaylee Joseph	Prop	Kalosipani Hopoate: NSB
GCT: Lily-Rose Kolc	Hooker	Chelsea Makira: CBY
NEW: Jacinta Carter	Prop	Latisha Smythe: CBY
GCT: Malaela Sua	2nd Row	Chloe Jackson (c): NSB
GCT: Matekino Kahukoti-Gray	2nd Row	Monalisa Soliola: CBY
GCT: Rilee Jorgensen	Lock	Losana Lutu: WTI
MAC: Emily Bella	Interchange	Leah Ollerton: NEW
BRI: Alyssa McCarthy	Interchange	Mercydes Faaeteete-Metcalf: CRO
NQL: Lily Peacock	Interchange	Marley Cardwell: PEN
CQC: Delaney Claridge	Interchange	Kate Fallon: SOU
WYN: Helen Uitualagi	Reserve	Charlotte Barwick: NEW
Deanna Turner	Coach	Kate Mullaly

Notes:

- Squad lists:

== See also ==
- 2023 NRL season
- 2023 State of Origin series
