= 2026 Women's State of Origin =

Rugby league series

- Won by: New South Wales
- Series margin: 3–0
- Points scored: 57
- Player of the series: Yasmin Meakes (Katrina Fanning Medal)

The 2026 Women's State of Origin Series was the ninth official Women's State of Origin rugby league series between New South Wales and Queensland. It was the third time in Women's State of Origin history to be played as a three-game series. As announced on 12 November 2025, the matches were held at McDonald Jones Stadium, Newcastle on 30 April 2026, Suncorp Stadium, Brisbane on 14 May 2026, and Cbus Super Stadium on the Gold Coast on 28 May 2026. The teams have played each other annually since 1999. The 2018 match was the first under the State of Origin banner.

The schedule followed the pattern used in 2025, with each game played on a Thursday night with two weeks between each game. A change from 2025 was that Game 2 rather than Game 1 opened NRL Magic Round.

The announcement by the NRL included the date of the Under-19s Women's Origin fixture, 18 June 2026, which was part of a double-header with the men's Under-19 Origin match.

== Game 1 ==
Thursday, 30 April 2026
19:45 AEST

New South Wales	11—6	Queensland
Tries: 2 Ellie Johnston 45'; Jessica Sergis 70'; Goals: 1 Jesse Southwell 46'; Field goals: 1 Jesse Southwell 62'	1st: 0–6; 2nd: 11–0; NRL Match Centre	Tries: 1 Otesa Pule 2'; Goals: 1 Lauren Brown 3'

McDonald Jones Stadium, Newcastle
Attendance: 20,179
Referee: Belinda Sharpe
Player of the Match: Yasmin Meakes

Team details
New South Wales		Position	Queensland
Name	Number	Position	Number	Name
Abbi Church	1	FB	1	Tamika Upton
Jaime Chapman	2	WG	2	Julia Robinson
Jessica Sergis	3	CE	3	Rory Owen
Isabelle Kelly (c)	4	CE	4	Shenae Ciesiolka
Jayme Fressard	5	WG	5	Phoenix-Raine Hippi
Jocelyn Kelleher	6	FE	6	Chantay Kiria-Ratu
Jesse Southwell	7	HB	7	Lauren Brown
Millie Elliott	8	PR	8	Makenzie Weale
Keeley Nizza	9	HK	9	Jada Ferguson
Ellie Johnston	10	PF	10	Jessika Elliston
Tiana Penitani-Gray	11	SR	11	Sienna Lofipo
Yasmin Meakes	12	SR	12	Romy Teitzel
Olivia Kernick	13	LK	13	Keilee Joseph
Olivia Higgins	14	IN	14	Emma Manzelmann
Kennedy Cherrington	15	IN	15	Otesa Pule
Kezie Apps	16	IN	16	Chelsea Lenarduzzi
Teagan Berry	17	IN	17	Brianna Clark
Corban Baxter	18	RES	18	Ivana Lolesio
John Strange		Coach		Nathan Cross

== Game 2 ==
Thursday, 14 May 2026
19:45 AEST

Queensland	10—14	New South Wales
Tries: 2 Rory Owen 31'; Jada Ferguson 43'; Goals: 1 Lauren Brown (1/2) 32'	1st: 6–8; 2nd: 4–6; NRL Match Centre	Tries: 3 Jaime Chapman 7'; Keeley Nizza 22'; Jessica Sergis 46'; Goals: 1 Jesse Southwell (1/3) 48'

Suncorp Stadium, Brisbane
Attendance: 23,846
Referee: Belinda Sharpe
Player of the Match: Jesse Southwell

== Game 3 ==
Thursday, 28 May 2026
19:45 AEST

Queensland	4—12	New South Wales
Tries: 1 Jasmine Peters 30'; Goals: nil Lauren Brown (0/1)	1st: 4–4; 2nd: 0–8; NRL Match Centre	Tries: 2 Isabelle Kelly 26'; Jayme Fressard 52'; Goals: 1 Jesse Southwell (2/3) 48', 54'

Cbus Super Stadium, Gold Coast
Attendance: 11,816
Referee: Belinda Sharpe
Player of the Match: Isabelle Kelly
Katrina Fanning Medal
(Player of the Series): Yasmin Meakes

== Teams ==
=== New South Wales Sky Blues ===
Position	Game 1	Game 2	Game 3
Fullback	PAR: Abbi Church		
Wing	GCT: Jaime Chapman		
Centre	SYD: Jessica Sergis		
Centre	SYD: Isabelle Kelly (c)		
Wing	SYD: Jayme Fressard		
Five-eighth	SYD: Jocelyn Kelleher		
Halfback	BRI: Jesse Southwell		
Prop	SYD: Millie Elliott		
Hooker	SYD: Keeley Nizza		NEW: Olivia Higgins
Prop	CRO: Ellie Johnston		
Second row	CRO: Tiana Penitani-Gray	WTI: Kezie Apps	
Second row	NEW: Yasmin Meakes		
Lock	SYD: Olivia Kernick		
Interchange	NEW: Olivia Higgins		SYD: Keeley Nizza
Interchange	PAR: Kennedy Cherrington		
Interchange	WTI: Kezie Apps	SYD: Rima Butler	
Interchange	SGI: Teagan Berry		
Replacement	SYD: Corban Baxter		CRO: Quincy Dodd
Reserve	SYD: Rima Butler	CRO: Quincy Dodd	SYD: Corban Baxter
Reserve	CRO: Quincy Dodd	SGI: Hannah Southwell	
Coach	John Strange		

=== Queensland Maroons ===
Position	Game 1	Game 2	Game 3
Fullback	BRI: Tamika Upton		GCT: Destiny Mino-Sinapati
Wing	BRI: Julia Robinson		SGI: Shenae Ciesiolka
Centre	PAR: Rory Owen		
Centre	GCT: Ivana Lolesio		
Wing	GCT: Phoenix-Raine Hippi	NQL: Jasmine Peters	
Five-eighth	CRO: Chantay Kiria-Ratu		
Halfback	GCT: Lauren Brown		
Prop	NQL: Makenzie Weale	SYD: Otesa Pule	
Hooker	BRI: Jada Ferguson	BRI: Destiny Brill	
Prop	GCT: Jessika Elliston		
Second row	GCT: Sienna Lofipo		
Second row	BRI: Romy Teitzel		
Lock	PAR: Keilee Joseph		
Interchange	NQL: Emma Manzelmann		
Interchange	SYD: Otesa Pule	BRI: Brianna Clark	
Interchange	BRI: Chelsea Lenarduzzi	NQL: Makenzie Weale	BRI: Lillian Yarrow
Interchange	SGI: Shenae Ciesiolka	BRI: Jada Ferguson	
Replacement	BRI: Destiny Brill	SGI: Shenae Ciesiolka	BRI: Chelsea Lenarduzzi
Reserve	BRI: Brianna Clark	BRI: Chelsea Lenarduzzi	CAN Sophie Holyman
Reserve	GCT: Destiny Mino-Sinapati		CRO: Georgia Ravics
Coach	Nathan Cross		

== Under-19s ==
Thursday, 18 June 2026
17:45 AEST

New South Wales	18—22	Queensland
Tries: 3 Crichton Ropati 4'; Falaniko 14'; McGregor 43'; Goals: 3 McGregor (3/3) 5', 15', 44'	1st: 12—10; 2nd: 6—12; NRL Match Centre	Tries: 4 Wright 11'; Paitai 22'; Walker 48'; Lewis 54'; Goals: 3 Luadaka (3/4) 12', 49', 56'

North Sydney Oval, Sydney
Player of the Match: Lilianah Lewis

=== Teams ===
New South Wales	Position	Queensland
SYD: Mia Vaotuua	Full Back	Torah Luadaka: GCT
SYD: Liesl Hopoate	Wing	Gabriella Savage: CAN
SYD: Anastasia Leatupue	Centre	Tia Molo: BRI
SYD: Logan Fletcher	Centre	Lilliana Nati: SUN
PAR: Freedom Crichton Ropati	Wing	Sienna Ibrahim: GCT
Ill: Skye Spencer	Five-Eighth	Mia Byrnes: BUR
SOU: Kiara McGregor	Halfback	Lilianah Lewis: GCT
NEW: Emily McArthur	Prop	Harlem Walker: BRI
Ill: Tori Shipton	Hooker	Enah Desic: GCT
PAR: Taylah Falaniko	Prop	Kiara Wright: TWE
NEW: Lacey Cross	2nd Row	Keira Rangi: GCT
PAR: Fontayne Tufuga	2nd Row	Deleni Paitai: BRI
PAR: Khyliah Gray	Lock	Amanii Misa: BRI
PAR: Ava Jones	Interchange	Okalani Compton: SLM
PEN: Ella Walker	Interchange	Lorren Ieli: BRT
NEW: Stella Lewis	Interchange	Elishama Suavai: NTP
Ill: Tahlia O'Brien	Interchange	Ace Pollock: SUN
PAR: Irae Savea	Replacement	Brianna Toopi: BUR
SYD: Tyra Dymock	Reserve	Lacey McLaren: GCT
PAR: Aaliyah Soufan	Reserve	Cianna Faulkner: MAC
Courtney Crawford	Coach	Maia Tua-Davidson

Notes:

- Squad lists:

== See also ==
- 2026 NRL season
- 2026 NRL Women's season
- 2026 State of Origin series
