= 2022 NRL Women's season =

NRL Telstra Women's Premiership
- Duration: 20 August – 2 October
- Teams: 6
- Minor premiers: Sydney Roosters
- Matches played: 18
- Points scored: 679
- Highest attendance: 42,921
- Lowest attendance: 505
- Broadcast partners: Nine Network; Fox League; Sky Sport (NZ); Sky Sports (UK)
- Premiers: Newcastle Knights (1st title)
- Wooden spoon: Gold Coast Titans (1st spoon)
- Biggest home win: Roosters 34 — 6 Dragons
- Biggest away win: Roosters 38 — 16 Eels
- Dally M Award: Raecene McGregor
- Top point-scorer: Zahara Temara (46)
- Top try-scorer(s): Jayme Fressard (5); Teagan Berry (5); Tamika Upton (5)

The 2022 NRLW Premiership was the fifth professional season of Women's rugby league in Australia. The season started on Saturday, 20 August and ran for seven weekends. This comprised five rounds, semi-finals for the top four teams, and a Grand Final that was played on Sunday 2 October as a curtain raiser to the 2022 men's Grand Final. This was the last season before the NRLW went professional.

== Teams ==
The line-up of teams remained the same as the postponed 2021 season (held from February to April in 2022). The number of teams would be increased to 10 in 2023.

Club	Season	Head coach	Captain(s)	Ref
Brisbane Broncos	5th season	Kelvin Wright	Ali Brigginshaw (5)	
Gold Coast Titans	2nd season	Karyn Murphy	Brittany Breayley-Nati (5)	
Newcastle Knights	2nd season	Ronald Griffiths	Millie Boyle (7) and Hannah Southwell (1)	
Parramatta Eels	2nd season	Dean Widders	Tiana Penitani (5) and Simaima Taufa (7)	
St. George Illawarra Dragons	5th season	Jamie Soward	Kezie Apps (5) also Keeley Davis (1: Round 3)	
Sydney Roosters	5th season	John Strange	Isabelle Kelly (6)	

Notes:

- In the Captain(s) column
  - The number next to the name indicates the number of games played as captain
  - The word and indicates joint captains. Of the two clubs that employed joint captains neither had both appear in every match.
  - The word also indicates the player deputised as captain when the regular captain missed one or more matches.

== Win/loss table ==
Team	1	2	3	4	5	SF	GF
Brisbane Broncos	NEW −18	**SYD** **−20**	**GCT** **+18**	**SGI** **−1***	**PAR** **−12**		
Gold Coast Titans	SGI −14	**NEW** **−4**	BRI −18	**PAR** **+2**	**SYD** **−26**		
Newcastle Knights	**BRI** **+18**	GCT +4	**PAR** **+2**	SYD −2	SGI +22	**SGI** **+24**	**PAR** **+20**
Parramatta Eels	**SYD** **−22**	**SGI** **−6**	NEW −2	GCT −2	BRI +12	SYD +14	NEW −20
St. George Illawarra Dragons	**GCT** **+14**	PAR +6	SYD −28	BRI +1*	**NEW** **−22**	NEW −24	
Sydney Roosters	PAR +22	BRI +20	**SGI** **+28**	**NEW** **+2**	GCT +26	**PAR** **−14**	
Team	1	2	3	4	5	SF	GF

Bold – Home game
* – Golden point game
Opponent for round listed above margin

== Regular season ==
The first announcement of the 2022 NRLW season's fixtures was released by the NRL on 8 July 2022.

Matches in rounds 1–3 were played as either curtain raisers or closers to men's matches, or as standalone fixtures. The announcement of Round 4 fixtures was delayed until the NRL placings were known and the four NRL week one finals matches were determined. Round 5 was a triple-header at Central Coast Stadium using the same format as rounds 1 and 2 from the 2021 season.

=== Round 1 ===
Home	Score	Away	Match information				
Home	Score	Away	Date and time	Venue	Referees	Attendance	Reports
Parramatta Eels	16 – 38	Sydney Roosters	Saturday, 20 August, 1:00 pm	CommBank Stadium	Belinda Sharpe	26,451 (Note: This NRLW match was part of a triple-header. The NRLW match followed a KOE NSW Cup match and preceded an NRL fixture between the Parramatta Eels and Canterbury Bulldogs. An attendance for the NRLW was not announced at the ground. The attendance for the NRL match was 26,451.)	
St. George Illawarra Dragons	26 – 12	Gold Coast Titans	Sunday, 21 August, 12:00 pm	WIN Stadium	Karra-Lee Nolan	5,135 (Note: This NRLW match was part of a double-header. The NRLW match preceded an NRL fixture between the St. George Illawarra Dragons and Gold Coast Titans. An attendance for the NRLW match of 5,135 was published on the NRL website's Match Centre. The attendance for the NRL match was 12,348.)	
Newcastle Knights	32 – 14	Brisbane Broncos	Sunday, 21 August, 6:10 pm	McDonald Jones Stadium	Kasey Badger	8,323 (Note: This NRLW match was part of a double-header. The NRLW match followed an NRL fixture between the Newcastle Knights and Canberra Raiders. The attendance for the NRL match was 16,768.)	

=== Round 2 ===
Home	Score	Away	Match information				
Home	Score	Away	Date and time	Venue	Referees	Attendance	Reports
Brisbane Broncos	8 – 28	Sydney Roosters	Saturday, 27 August, 1:10 pm	Suncorp Stadium	Kasey Badger	11,816	
Parramatta Eels	10 – 16	St. George Illawarra Dragons	Sunday, 28 August, 12:00 pm	CommBank Stadium	Belinda Sharpe	9,987 (Note: This NRLW match was part of a double-header. The NRLW match preceded an NRL fixture between the Wests Tigers and St. George Illawarra Dragons. An attendance for the NRLW match of 8,323 was published on the NRL website's Match Centre. The attendance for the NRL match was 9,987.)	
Gold Coast Titans	12 – 16	Newcastle Knights	Sunday, 28 August, 6:10 pm	Cbus Super Stadium	Rochelle Tamarua	11,816 (Note: This NRLW match was part of a double-header. The NRLW match followed an NRL fixture between the Gold Coast Titans and Newcastle Knights. The attendance for the NRL match was 11,816.)	

=== Round 3 ===
Home	Score	Away	Match information				
Home	Score	Away	Date and time	Venue	Referees	Attendance	Reports
Sydney Roosters	34 – 6	St. George Illawarra Dragons	Friday, 2 September, 5:40 pm	Allianz Stadium	Kasey Badger	41,906 (Note: This NRLW match was part of a double-header. The NRLW match preceded an NRL fixture between the Sydney Roosters and South Sydney Rabbitohs. An attendance for the NRLW was not announced at the ground. The attendance for the NRL match was 41.906. The NRLW match was rescheduled by the NRL on 13 August. The original schedule was for the match to follow an NRL fixture, Wests Tigers vs Canberra Raiders, at Leichhardt Oval on Sunday, 4 September.)	
Brisbane Broncos	22 – 4	Gold Coast Titans	Saturday, 3 September, 1:10 pm	Moreton Daily Stadium	Belinda Sharpe	1,619	
Newcastle Knights	18 – 16	Parramatta Eels	Sunday, 4 September, 12:00 pm	McDonald Jones Stadium	Karra-Lee Nolan	9,189 (Note: This NRLW match was part of a double-header. The NRLW match preceded an NRL fixture between the Newcastle Knights and Cronulla Sharks. An attendance for the NRLW of "about 9,100" was announced at the ground. The attendance for the NRL match was 16,808.)	

=== Round 4 ===
Home	Score	Away	Match information				
Home	Score	Away	Date and time	Venue	Referees	Attendance	Reports
Gold Coast Titans	18 – 16	Parramatta Eels	10 September, 1:05 pm	AAMI Park (Note: These two NRLW matches were part of a Triple-Header. The NRLW matches preceded an NRL fixture between Melbourne Storm and Canberra Raiders. An attendance for each NRLW match was announced at the ground. The attendance for the NRL match was 20.838.)	Karra-Lee Nolan	505	
Brisbane Broncos	18 – 19	St. George Illawarra Dragons	11 September, 2:50 pm	AAMI Park	Ziggy Przeklasa-Adamski	1,229	
Sydney Roosters	18 – 16	Newcastle Knights	11 September, 1:10 pm	Allianz Stadium	Belinda Sharpe	4,063 (Note: This NRLW match was part of a double-header. The NRLW match preceded an NRL fixture between the Sydney Roosters and South Sydney Rabbitohs. An attendance for the NRLW was announced at the ground. The attendance for the NRL match was 39,816.)	

=== Round 5 ===
Home	Score	Away	Match information				
Home	Score	Away	Date and time	Venue	Referees	Attendance	Reports
Brisbane Broncos	16 – 28	Parramatta Eels	Sunday, 18 September, 12:05 pm	Central Coast Stadium	Kasey Badger	3,066	
Gold Coast Titans	12 – 38	Sydney Roosters	Sunday, 18 September, 1:55 pm	Central Coast Stadium	Belinda Sharpe	4,776	
St. George Illawarra Dragons	8 – 30	Newcastle Knights	Sunday, 18 September, 3:45 pm	Central Coast Stadium	Ziggy Przeklasa-Adamski	6,214	

== Ladder ==
2022 NRL Women's season
Pos	Team	Pld	W	D	L	B	PF	PA	PD	Pts
1	Sydney Roosters	5	5	0	0	0	156	58	+98	10
2	Newcastle Knights	5	4	0	1	0	112	68	+44	8
3	St. George Illawarra Dragons	5	3	0	2	0	75	104	−29	6
4	Parramatta Eels	5	1	0	4	0	86	106	−20	2
5	Brisbane Broncos	5	1	0	4	0	78	111	−33	2
6	Gold Coast Titans	5	1	0	4	0	58	118	−60	2

=== Ladder progression ===
- Numbers highlighted in green indicate that the team finished the round inside the top four.
- Numbers highlighted in blue indicates the team finished first on the ladder in that round.
- Numbers highlighted in red indicates the team finished last place on the ladder in that round.

	Team	1	2	3	4	5
1	Sydney Roosters	2	4	6	8	10
2	Newcastle Knights	2	4	6	6	8
3	St. George Illawarra Dragons	2	4	4	6	6
4	Parramatta Eels	0	0	0	0	2
5	Brisbane Broncos	0	0	2	2	2
6	Gold Coast Titans	0	0	0	2	2

== Finals series ==
Two semi-finals were played on 25 September 2022 as part of a quadruple-header also featuring the men's and women's Prime Minister's XIII matches against Papua New Guinea.

Home	Score	Away	Match information				
Home	Score	Away	Date and time	Venue	Referees	Attendance	Reports
Newcastle Knights	30 – 6	St. George Illawarra Dragons	Sunday, 25 September, 2:05 PM	Suncorp Stadium	Kasey Badger	3,649	
Sydney Roosters	10 – 24	Parramatta Eels	Sunday, 25 September, 3:50 PM	Suncorp Stadium	Belinda Sharpe	6,173	

The Grand Final was played on Sunday, 2 October 2022, between the winners of the two semi-finals, at Accor Stadium as curtain-raiser to the 2022 men's season grand final.

Home	Score	Away	Match information				
Home	Score	Away	Date and time	Venue	Referees	Attendance	Reports
Newcastle Knights	32 – 12	Parramatta Eels	Sunday, 2 October, 3:55 PM	Accor Stadium	Kasey Badger	42,921	

== Grand Final ==
Sunday, 2 October
4:05pm AEDT (UTC+11:00)

Newcastle Knights	32 – 12	Parramatta Eels
Tries: **7** Takairangi 17', 63'; Paki 20'; Teitzel 27'; Upton 38'; Southwell 67'; Clydsdale 69'; Goals: **2** Dibb 28' (1/4); Southwell 68' (1/3)	1st: 14 – 6; 2nd: 18 – 6 Highlights; Reports	Tries: **2** Anderson 12'; Taufa 50'; Goals: **2** Preston 13', 51' (2/2)

Accor Stadium
Attendance: 42,921
Karyn Murphy Medallist: Tamika Upton (Newcastle)
Referee: Kasey Badger

Team details

Newcastle Knights
FB	1	Tamika Upton
WG	2	Kiana Takairangi
CE	3	Shanice Parker
CE	4	Bobbi Law
WG	5	Emmanita Paki
FE	6	Kirra Dibb
HB	7	Jesse Southwell
PR	8	Caitlan Johnston
HK	9	Olivia Higgins
PR	10	Millie Boyle (c)
SR	11	Romy Teitzel
SR	12	Yasmin Clydsdale
LK	13	Kayla Romaniuk
Interchange:
BE	14	Emma Manzelmann
BE	15	Tayla Predebon
BE	16	Simone Karpani
BE	18	Caitlin Moran
Reserve:
RE	17	Makenzie Weale
Coach:
Ronald Griffiths

Parramatta Eels
FB	1	Gayle Broughton
WG	2	Zali Fay
CE	3	Abbi Church
CE	4	Rikeya Horne
WG	5	Cassey Tohi-Hiku
FE	6	Ashleigh Quinlan
HB	7	Tayla Preston
PR	8	Kennedy Cherrington
HK	9	Brooke Anderson
PR	10	Ellie Johnston
SR	11	Christian Pio
SR	12	Vanessa Foliaki
LK	13	Simaima Taufa (c)
Interchange:
BE	14	Filomina Hanisi
BE	15	Seli Mailangi
BE	16	Najvada George
BE	17	Rima Butler
Reserve:
RE	18	Ruby-Jean Kennard
Coach:
Dean Widders

== Team of the week ==
At the conclusion of each round, the media department of the NRL announce a team of the week. Seventeen players were named.

Jersey	Position	Round 1	Round 2	Round 3	Round 4	Round 5	Semi-finals
1	Fullback	Sam Bremner	Tamika Upton	Sam Bremner	Evania Pelite	Gayle Broughton	Tamika Upton
2	Wing	Teagan Berry	Teagan Berry	Leianne Tufuga	Julia Robinson	Zali Fay	Teagan Berry
3	Centre	Isabelle Kelly	Tiana Penitani	Jessica Sergis	Isabelle Kelly	Jessica Sergis	Abbi Church
4	Centre	Page McGregor	Evania Pelite	Rikeya Horne	Shenae Ciesiolka	Taliah Fuimaono	Shanice Parker
5	Wing	Julia Robinson	Julia Robinson	Jaime Chapman	Karina Brown	Jayme Fressard	Cassey Tohi-Hiku
6	Fullback	Taliah Fuimaono	Tarryn Aiken	Zahara Temara	Zali Hopkins	Ashleigh Quinlan	Kirra Dibb
7	Halfback	Jesse Southwell	Raecene McGregor	Raecene McGregor	Rachael Pearson	Jesse Southwell	Tayla Preston
8	Prop	Millie Boyle	Shannon Mato	Chelsea Lenarduzzi	Millie Boyle	Jesse Southwell	Millie Boyle
9	Hooker	Keeley Davis	Destiny Brill	Olivia Higgins	Quincy Dodd	Destiny Brill	Brooke Anderson
10	Prop	Steph Hancock	Sarah Togatuki	Caitlan Johnston	Tara McGrath-West	Kennedy Cherrington	Kennedy Cherrington
11	Second-row	Shaniah Power	Kezie Apps	Vanessa Foliaki	Yasmin Clydsdale	Yasmin Clydsdale	Romy Teitzel
12	Second-row	Keilee Joseph	Olivia Kernick	Amber Hall	Kezie Apps	Otesa Pule	Yasmin Clydsdale
13	Lock	Simaima Taufa	Holli Wheeler	Keilee Joseph	Georgia Hale	Simaima Taufa	Holli Wheeler
14	interchange	Kennedy Cherrington	Emma Manzelmann	Tayla Preston	Jada Ferguson	Ali Brigginshaw	Ashleigh Quinlan
15	interchange	Tallisha Harden	Tayla Predebon	Jocelyn Kelleher	Simaima Taufa	Keilee Joseph	Caitlan Johnston
16	interchange	Holli Wheeler	Keilee Joseph	Monalisa Soliola	Keilee Joseph	Shannon Mato	Ellie Johnston
17	interchange	Emma Tonegato	Chelsea Lenarduzzi	Tamika Upton	Rima Pirini Butler	Tayla Predebon	Sarah Togatuki

== Dream Team ==
In the week between the semi-finals and Grand Final, the Rugby League Players Association announced a Dream Team. The team was selected by the players, who each cast one vote for each position.

Jersey	Position	Player
1	Fullback	Sam Bremner
2	Wing	Julia Robinson
3	Centre	Isabelle Kelly
4	Centre	Jaime Chapman
5	Wing	Leianne Tufuga
6	Fullback	Tarryn Aiken
7	Halfback	Raecene McGregor
8	Prop	Millie Boyle
9	Hooker	Destiny Brill
10	Prop	Caitlan Johnston
11	Second-row	Olivia Kernick
12	Second-row	Amber Hall
13	Lock	Keilee Joseph

== Individual awards ==
=== Dally M Medal Awards Night ===
The following awards were presented at the Dally M Medal Awards ceremony in Sydney on the night of 28 September.

Dally M Medal Player of the Year: Raecene McGregor ( Sydney Roosters)

Captain of the Year: Isabelle Kelly ( Sydney Roosters)

Coach of the Year: John Strange ( Sydney Roosters)

Provan-Summons Medal: Toni Hunt ( Brisbane Broncos)

Rookie of the Year: Jesse Southwell ( Newcastle Knights)

Try of the Year: Tarryn Aiken for Brisbane Broncos versus Sydney Roosters (27 August 2022).

Tackle of the Year: Tarryn Aiken for Brisbane Broncos on Jessica Sergis of the Sydney Roosters (27 August 2022).

=== RLPA Players' Champion Awards ===
The following awards were voted for by NRLW players at the end of the season.

The Players' Champion: Raecene McGregor ( Sydney Roosters

Rookie of the Year: Gayle Broughton ( Parramatta Eels)

Dennis Tutty Award: Hannah Southwell ( Newcastle Knights)

=== Statistical awards ===
Highest Point scorer in regular season: Zahara Temara ( Sydney Roosters) 44 (1t 20g)

Top try scorers in regular season: Jayme Fressard ( Sydney Roosters) 5

== Players and transfers ==
Player signings for the 2022 season began in May 2022.

Table last updated: 21 July 2022.

2022 NRLW transfers
Player	2021 club	2022 club	Announcement date	Reference
Millie Boyle	Brisbane Broncos	Newcastle Knights	18 May 2022	
Lauren Brown	Brisbane Broncos	Gold Coast Titans	23 May 2022	
Hagiga Mosby	Brisbane Broncos	Gold Coast Titans	5 Jun 2022	
Tamika Upton	Brisbane Broncos	Newcastle Knights	18 May 2022	
Nakita Sao	Brisbane Broncos	Injured	13 Mar 2022	
Annetta Nu'uausala	Newcastle Knights	Brisbane Broncos	7 Jun 2022	
Emily Curtain	Parramatta Eels	Gold Coast Titans	5 Jun 2022	
Botille Vette-Welsh	Parramatta Eels	Injured	5 Apr 2022	
Madison Bartlett	St. George Illawarra Dragons	Gold Coast Titans	5 Jun 2022	
Jaime Chapman	St. George Illawarra Dragons	Brisbane Broncos	3 Jun 2022	
Kody House	St. George Illawarra Dragons	Retired	22 Apr 2022	
Yasmin Clydsdale	Sydney Roosters	Newcastle Knights	3 Jun 2022	
Olivia Higgins	Sydney Roosters	Newcastle Knights	3 Jun 2022	
Simone Karpani	Sydney Roosters	Newcastle Knights	3 Jun 2022	
Brydie Parker	Sydney Roosters	Injured	11 Apr 2022	
Tayla Predebon	Sydney Roosters	Newcastle Knights	3 Jun 2022	
Hannah Southwell	Sydney Roosters	Newcastle Knights	1 Jun 2022	
Brooke Walker	Carlton AFLW	Parramatta Eels	27 May 2022	
Gayle Broughton	New Zealand 7s	Parramatta Eels	1 Jun 2022	
Brooke Anderson	No club	Parramatta Eels	1 Jun 2022	
Rueben Cherrington	No club	Parramatta Eels	17 May 2022	
Vanessa Foliaki	No club	Parramatta Eels	1 Jun 2022	
Ruby-Jean Kennard	No club	Parramatta Eels	1 Jun 2022	
Tayla Preston	No club	Parramatta Eels	1 Jun 2022	
Rima Pirini Butler	No club	Parramatta Eels	1 Jun 2022	
Ash Quinlan	No club	Parramatta Eels	1 Jun 2022	
Crystal Tamarua	Gold Coast Titans	Brisbane Broncos	9 Jun 2022	
Jasmine Fogavini	No club	Brisbane Broncos	9 Jun 2022	
Sophie Holyman	Queensland Reds Rugby Union	Brisbane Broncos	9 Jun 2022	
Tamsin Barber	No club	Newcastle Knights	9 Jun 2022	
Tiana Davison	No club	Newcastle Knights	9 Jun 2022	
Caitlin Moran	No club	Newcastle Knights	9 Jun 2022	
Nicole Nathan	No club	Newcastle Knights	9 Jun 2022	
Emmanita Paki	No club	Newcastle Knights	9 Jun 2022	
Shanice Parker	No club	Newcastle Knights	9 Jun 2022	
Kiana Takairangi	No club	Newcastle Knights	9 Jun 2022	
Brianna Clark	Gold Coast Titans	Brisbane Broncos	10 Jun 2022	
Nita Maynard	Parramatta Eels	Brisbane Broncos	10 Jun 2022	
Paige Parker	Newcastle Knights	Brisbane Broncos	10 Jun 2022	
Shakiah Tungai	No club	Brisbane Broncos	10 Jun 2022	
Annette Brander	No club	Gold Coast Titans	23 Jun 2022	
Apii Nicholls-Pualau	No club	Gold Coast Titans	23 Jun 2022	
Rona Peters	No club	Gold Coast Titans	23 Jun 2022	
Destiny Brill	Gold Coast Titans	Sydney Roosters	23 Jun 2022	
Jayme Fressard	Newcastle Knights	Sydney Roosters	23 Jun 2022	
Shaniah Power	Gold Coast Titans	Sydney Roosters	23 Jun 2022	
Corban Baxter	Sydney Roosters	Pregnancy	27 Jun 2022	
Fatafehi Hanisi	Parramatta Eels	St. George Illawarra Dragons	1 Jul 2022	
Zali Hopkins	No club	St. George Illawarra Dragons	1 Jul 2022	
Andie Robinson	No club	St. George Illawarra Dragons	1 Jul 2022	
Monalisa Soliola	No club	St. George Illawarra Dragons	1 Jul 2022	
Shontelle Stowers	No club	St. George Illawarra Dragons	1 Jul 2022	
Sam Bremner	Pregnancy	Sydney Roosters	1 Jul 2022	
Shannon Rose	No club	Sydney Roosters	1 Jul 2022	
Jasmin Strange	No club	Sydney Roosters	1 Jul 2022	
Jada Taylor	No club	Sydney Roosters	1 Jul 2022	
Angelina Teakaraanga-Katoa	No club	Sydney Roosters	1 Jul 2022	
Roxette Murdoch	Brisbane Broncos	Gold Coast Titans	17 Jul 2022	
Makenzie Weale	No club	Newcastle Knights	21 Jul 2022	
Jakiya Whitfeld	No club	Newcastle Knights	21 Jul 2022	
Zali Fay	No club	Parramatta Eels	21 Jul 2022	
Najvada George	No club	Parramatta Eels	21 Jul 2022	
Losana Lutu	No club	Parramatta Eels	21 Jul 2022	
Cassey Tohi-Hiku	No club	Parramatta Eels	21 Jul 2022	
Luisa Yaranamua	No club	Parramatta Eels	21 Jul 2022	
