= Hailee-Jay Ormond-Maunsell =

NZ international rugby league footballer (born 2004)

Personal information
- Full name: Hailee-Jay Ormond-Maunsell
- Born: 23 February 2004 (age 22) Invercargill, New Zealand
- Height: 172 cm (5 ft 8 in)
- Weight: 79 kg (12 st 6 lb)

Playing information
- Position: Centre, Wing, Second-row
Club
Years	Team	Pld	T	G	FG	P
2021–24	Gold Coast Titans	11	4	0	0	16
2025–	Nth Qld Cowboys	12	0	0	0	0
	Total	23	4	0	0	16
Representative
Years	Team	Pld	T	G	FG	P
2022	New Zealand	1	0	0	0	0
- Source: As of 17 July 2026

Hailee-Jay Ormond-Maunsell (born 23 February 2004) is a New Zealand professional rugby league footballer who currently plays for the North Queensland Cowboys in the NRL Women's Premiership.

She is a New Zealand international and previously played for the Gold Coast Titans.

== Background ==
Ormond-Maunsell was born in Invercargill and grew up in Melbourne. In Victoria, she played her junior rugby league for the Werribee Bears before moving to Queensland to join the Gold Coast Titans junior female academy in 2021.

While living on the Gold Coast, Queensland, she attended Keebra Park State High School.

== Playing career ==
=== Early years ===
In 2021, Ormond-Maunsell played for the Burleigh Bears in the QRL Under-19s competition.

In early 2022, she played for the senior Burleigh women's team in the QRL Women's Premiership.

=== Gold Coast Titans ===
In Round 3 of the delayed 2021 NRL Women's season, Ormond-Maunsell made her NRLW debut, starting on the wing and scoring a try in their win over the Parramatta Eels. She played four games in her rookie season for the club. Later that year, she played two more games in the 2022 NRL Women's season.

In October 2022, she was named in New Zealand's 2021 Rugby League World Cup squad.

On 6 November 2022, she made her Test debut for New Zealand, starting on the wing in their win over the Cook Islands.

In 2023, she played just two NRLW games for the Titans, scoring the winning try over the Cronulla Sharks in Round 2. In 2024, she moved into the forwards, playing three games off the bench and scoring one try.

=== North Queensland Cowboys ===
On 7 February, Ormond-Maunsell joined the North Queensland Cowboys on a one-year contract.
