= Queensland women's under-19 rugby league team =

Youth rugby league team representing Queensland, Australia

Queensland Women's Under-19
Team information
- Nickname: Maroons
- Governing body: Queensland Rugby League

Uniforms
First colours

Team results
- Biggest win
- Queensland 20–14 New South Wales (Kayo Stadium; 13 July 2023)
- Biggest defeat
- New South Wales 46–4 Queensland (Leichhardt Oval; 20 June 2024)

The Queensland Women's Under-19 rugby league team, also known as Queensland Women's Under-19s or Queensland U19 Women's, represents Queensland in the sport of rugby league at an under-19 age level. They are administered by the Queensland Rugby League. In 2019, an under-18 team played a fixture against the New South Wales Women's Under-18 team as a curtain raiser to the Women's State of Origin game. The following year the under-18s matches were cancelled and when the competition returned in 2021 it was contested by under-19's teams.

== History ==
In December 2017, the Queensland Rugby League (QRL) announced an under-18 women's Emerging Origin development squad and camp after running an under-15 camp earlier that year. In October 2018, Queensland Rugby League announced an under-18 squad for the 2019 season. On 11 April 2019, it was announced that the first every under-18 women's State of Origin game would be held as a curtain raiser to the Women's State of Origin fixture at North Sydney Oval. On 7 June 2019, the inaugural side was selected, which included Rhiannon Revell-Blair, who played for the senior Queensland side a year earlier as a 17-year-old. On 21 June 2019, the side lost to New South Wales 24–4 in the inaugural under-18 women's Origin fixture. The under-18s fixture was expected to be included before the 2020 Women's State of Origin, but with the changes in the schedule due to COVID-19 the under-18s match was cancelled.

In 2021, the under-19s fixture replaced the under-18s with head coach Kelvin Wright announcing the team for the inaugural Under-19s State of Origin clash a week before the match was played on 25 June. Queensland lost the game 16–12 which was played as the curtain-raiser to the 2021 Women's State of Origin at Sunshine Coast Stadium. The 2022 fixture was played on 23 June as a curtain raiser for the under-19 men's game. The 22-player squad was coached by Ben Jeffries and included 13 players from the Queensland Rubys team won the Under 19 National Championships earlier in the month. However, New South Wales retained the State of Origin title with a 22–6 win. Queensland won their first Women's U19 title the following year when the team, this time coached by Deanne Turner, claimed a 20–14 win over their interstate rivals. In 2024, Queensland suffered a record defeat when New South Wales retook the State of Origin title with a 46–4 win at Leichhardt Oval.

== Results ==
Note: Queensland score is given first.

Date	Opponent	Score	Competition	Venue	Ref.
25 June 2021	New South Wales U19	12–16	2021 U19 Women's Origin	Sunshine Coast Stadium	
23 June 2022	New South Wales U19	6–22	2022 U19 Women's Origin	Leichhardt Oval	
13 July 2023	New South Wales U19	20–14	2023 U19 Women's Origin	Kayo Stadium	
23 June 2024	New South Wales U19	4–46	2024 U19 Women's Origin	Leichhardt Oval	
19 June 2025	New South Wales U19	10–26	2025 U19 Women's Origin	Sunshine Coast Stadium	
18 June 2026	New South Wales U19	22–18	2026 U19 Women's Origin	North Sydney Oval	
