= Jamie Feeney =

Australian rugby league footballer and coach

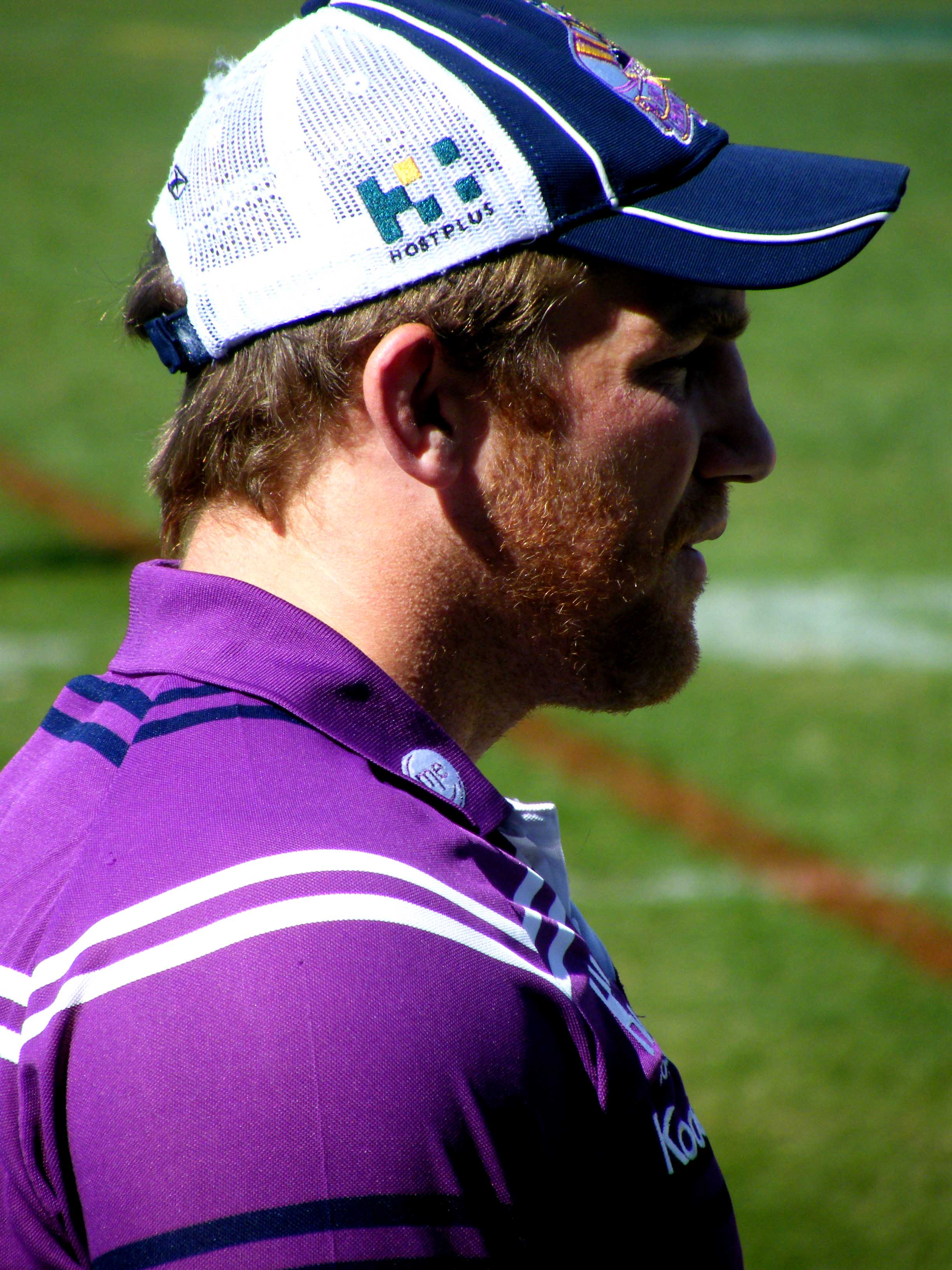

Personal information
- Full name: Jamie Feeney
- Born: 2 May 1978 (age 48) Muswellbrook, New South Wales, Australia

Playing information
- Height: 184 cm (6 ft 0 in)
- Weight: 98 kg (15 st 6 lb)
- Position: Second-row, Lock
Club
Years	Team	Pld	T	G	FG	P
1999–04	Canterbury Bulldogs	112	24	0	0	96
2005–06	Melbourne Storm	20	0	0	0	0
	Total	132	24	0	0	96
Representative
Years	Team	Pld	T	G	FG	P
2002	NSW Country	1	0	0	0	0

Coaching information
Club
Years	Team	Gms	W	D	L	W%
2020	Sydney Roosters Women	4	2	0	2	50
2021	Gold Coast Titans Women	6	3	0	3	50
	Total	10	5	0	5	50

Jamie Feeney (born 9 April 1978) is an Australian former professional rugby league footballer who played in the 1990s and 2000s. He played as a second-row and lock for Canterbury Bankstown and the Melbourne Storm in the NRL. He was later the coach of the Sydney Roosters Women and Gold Coast Titans Women in the NRLW.

== Background ==
Born in Muswellbrook, New South Wales. Feeney was educated at Muswellbrook High School and then St Josephs High School, Aberdeen.

After graduating high school, Feeney attended university at Australian College of Physical Education. He studied a bachelor's degree in personal development, health and physical education

== Playing career ==
Feeney joined Canterbury in 1997 and won the reserve grade premiership with the club in 1998. In 1999, Feeney made his first grade debut for Canterbury against Auckland.

Over the coming years, Feeney became a regular in the Canterbury side but missed out on playing in the 2004 premiership winning team against the Sydney Roosters.

In 2005, Feeney joined Melbourne Storm and played two seasons with the club. He was part of the extended bench for the club's 2006 NRL Grand Final loss against Brisbane.

== Coaching career ==
In 2006, Feeney became coach of the Central Coast Jersey Flegg Cup team.

He has previously been the NSWRL Performance Programs Manager, NRL NRL Elite Female Pathways Manager, and has been an assistant coach with the Jillaroos since 2016.

=== 2020 ===
In June 2020, Feeney was appointed as head coach of the Sydney Roosters NRL Women's Premiership team, leading the team to the 2020 NRL Women's Grand Final, with his team losing 20–10 to Brisbane Broncos.

=== 2021 ===
Feeney was replaced as Sydney Roosters coach in February 2021 after moving to Queensland.

On 14 June 2021, Feeney was announced as the inaugural coach of the Gold Coast Titans NRLW team, following the expansion of the competition for the 2021 season.

=== 2022 ===
With Feeney as coach, the Titans made the 2021 NRL Women's season finals (competition held in 2022), after finishing third on the ladder. The Titans were eliminated from the finals by St George Illawarra Dragons. Feeney was replaced by Karyn Murphy before the 2022 season commenced, when the Titans made the role full-time.

He would later coach Marsden State High School to the 2022 Queensland schoolgirls rugby league title, with Marsden defeating Kirwin 36–16 in the final.

=== 2023 ===
In late 2022, Feeney joined Queensland Cup team Brisbane Tigers as an assistant coach, working with head coach Matt Church.

== Career highlights ==
- Junior Club: Muswellbrook Rams
- First Grade Debut: Round 12, Canterbury v Warriors at Telstra Stadium 23 May 1999
