= Ivana Lolesio =

Samoa international rugby league player

Personal information
- Born: 6 February 2004 (age 22) Gold Coast, Queensland, Australia
- Height: 170 cm (5 ft 7 in)
- Weight: 82 kg (12 st 13 lb)

Playing information
- Position: Centre
Club
Years	Team	Pld	T	G	FG	P
2025–	Gold Coast Titans	12	1	0	0	4
Representative
Years	Team	Pld	T	G	FG	P
2026	Queensland	1	0	0	0	0
2026–	Samoa	4	1	0	0	4
- Source: As of 7 November 2026
- Relatives: Noah Lolesio (brother)

Ivana Lolesio (born 6 February 2004) is an Australian rugby league footballer who plays as a centre for the Gold Coast Titans in the NRL Women's Premiership.

== Background ==
Lolesio, who is of Samoan descent, was born and raised on the Gold Coast, Queensland and attended Aquinas College, Southport, where she played for their rugby sevens team. In 2022, she represented the Australian Under-18 Schoolgirls side at the World Schools 7s tournament in New Zealand.

Her older brother, Noah Lolesio, is a Wallabies international.

== Playing career ==
=== Gold Coast Titans ===
In 2024, Lolesio switched to rugby league, signing with the Gold Coast Titans. She began the 2024 season playing for the Burleigh Bears in the QRL Women's Premiership before a knee injury ruled her out for the rest of the year.

In Round 1 of the 2025 NRL Women's season, Lolesio made her NRLW debut in a 20–6 loss to the North Queensland Cowboys. She played all 12 games for the Titans in 2025 and was named the club's Rookie of the Year.

=== Representative ===
On 22 April 2026, Lolesio was named to make her Women's State of Origin debut for Queensland in Game I of the 2026 Women's State of Origin series.

She made her Samoa début in the 2026 Rugby League World Cup 40-0 defeat to Australia on 16 October 2026.
