= Phoenix-Raine Hippi =

Australian professional rugby league player

Personal information
- Born: 12 September 2006 (age 20) Lismore, New South Wales, Australia
- Height: 175 cm (5 ft 9 in)
- Weight: 74 kg (11 st 9 lb)

Playing information
- Position: Wing, Centre
Club
Years	Team	Pld	T	G	FG	P
2025–	Gold Coast Titans	7	9	0	0	36
Representative
Years	Team	Pld	T	G	FG	P
2025	Prime Minister's XIII	1	3	0	0	12
2026	Indigenous All Stars	1	1	0	0	4
2026	Queensland	1	0	0	0	0
- Source: As of 16 November 2026

Phoenix-Raine Hippi (born 12 September 2006) is an Australian rugby league footballer who plays as a winger for the Gold Coast Titans in the NRL Women's Premiership.

== Background ==
Hippi was born in Lismore, New South Wales and is of Indigenous Australian descent.

She played her junior rugby league in Warwick, Queensland for the Eastern Suburbs Hornerts. She attended high school at Ballina Coast High School, where she was named an Australian Schoolgirls representative in 2024.

== Playing career ==
=== Early career ===
From 2023 to 2025, Hippi played for the Tweed Heads Seagulls in the QRL Under-19s Premiership.

=== 2025 ===
In 2025, Hippi joined the Gold Coast Titans NRLW squad. On 19 June, she represented Queensland Under-19 in their loss to New South Wales.

In Round 6 of the 2025 NRL Women's season, she made her NRLW debut, scoring a try in the Titans' 14–4 loss to the Sydney Roosters. She finished her rookie season scoring nine tries in seven games, signing a two-year contract extension with the Titans.

On 12 October, she scored a hat-trick in the Prime Minister's XIII 50–0 win over Papua New Guinea.

=== 2026 ===
On 15 February, Hippi scored a try in the Indigenous All Stars 20–14 win over the Māori All Stars.

On 22 April, Hippi was named to make her Women's State of Origin debut for Queensland in Game I of the 2026 Women's State of Origin series.
