= Libby Surha =

Australian rugby league footballer

Personal information
- Full name: Libby Surha
- Born: 22 April 2004 (age 22) Mackay, Queensland, Australia
- Height: 161 cm (5 ft 3 in)
- Weight: 72 kg (11 st 5 lb)

Playing information
- Position: Wing, Centre, Second-row
Club
Years	Team	Pld	T	G	FG	P
2023–24	Nth Qld Cowboys	5	1	0	0	4
Representative
Years	Team	Pld	T	G	FG	P
2022	Prime Minister's XIII	1	0	0	0	0
- Source: As of 22 September 2024

Libby Surha (born 22 April 2004) is an Australian professional rugby league footballer who currently plays for the Mackay Cutters in the QRL Women's Premiership.

A second-row or centre, she is a Prime Minister's XIII representative and previously played for the North Queensland Cowboys in the NRL Women's Premiership.

== Background ==
Surha was born in Mackay, Queensland and is of Indigenous Australian descent. She played her junior rugby league for Norths Devils Mackay and attended Mackay North State High School.

== Playing career ==
=== Early years ===
In 2022, Surha played for the Mackay Cutters in the QRL Under-19s competition. In September, she represented the Prime Minister's XIII, coming off the bench in their 64–6 win over Papua New Guinea. In October 2022, she was a member of the Canberra Raiders Tarsha Gale Cup pre-season squad.

=== 2023 ===
In 2023, Surha began the season playing for the Cutters under-19s side before moving up to their QRL Women's Premiership team, playing six games.

On 23 May, she signed a development contract with the North Queensland Cowboys. On 13 July, she started at centre for Queensland under-19 and scored a try in their 20–14 win over New South Wales.

In Round 6 of the 2023 NRL Women's season, she made her NRLW debut for the Cowboys, starting at second-row and scoring a try in a 16–12 loss to the Parramatta Eels. She left the field after 68 minutes with a shoulder injury, which later ruled her out for the rest of the season.

=== 2024 ===
In May, Surha started on the wing in the Mackay Cutters' QRLW Grand Final win over the Norths Devils.

In Round 3 of the 2024 NRL Women's season, she made her season debut, starting on the wing in the Cowboys' loss to Parramatta.

=== 2025 ===
She left the Cowboys ahead of the 2025 NRL Women's season, joining the Mackay Cutters in the QRL Women's Premiership.
