= Sarina Masaga =

Samoa international rugby league footballer

Personal information
- Born: 24 May 2005 (age 21) Otahuhu, New Zealand
- Height: 167 cm (5 ft 6 in)
- Weight: 80 kg (12 st 8 lb)

Playing information
- Position: Centre, Second-row
Club
Years	Team	Pld	T	G	FG	P
2024–	Gold Coast Titans	11	2	0	0	8
Representative
Years	Team	Pld	T	G	FG	P
2024–	Samoa	4	2	0	0	8
- Source: As of 16 October 2026

Sarina Masaga is a rugby league footballer who plays centre for the Gold Coast Titans Women.

== Background ==
Masaga is of Samoan descent.

== Playing career ==
=== 2024 ===
On 8 September, Masaga made her debut at centre for the Gold Coast Titans, losing 24–14 to the Parramatta Eels. In round 9, Masaga scored her first try in their 16–12 loss to the Canberra Raiders. On 28 October, Masaga resigned with the Gold Coast Titans until 2026.

Masaga was selected to play for Samoa in the 2024 Rugby League Pacific Championships. On 19 October, Masaga scored two tries against Tonga.
