= Chantay Kiria-Ratu =

Cook Islands & NZ international rugby league player

Personal information
- Born: 20 October 2004 (age 22) Auckland, New Zealand

Playing information
- Position: Five-eighth, Halfback
Club
Years	Team	Pld	T	G	FG	P
2023	Gold Coast Titans	11	2	2	0	12
2025–	Cronulla Sharks	13	1	11	1	27
	Total	24	3	13	1	39
Representative
Years	Team	Pld	T	G	FG	P
2022–23	Cook Islands	2	1	8	0	20
2026	Queensland	3	0	0	0	0
2026	New Zealand	3	1	12	0	28
- Source: As of 15 November 2026

Chantay Kiria-Ratu (born 20 October 2004) is a Cook Islands and New Zealand international rugby league footballer who plays as a halfback for the Cronulla Sharks in the NRL Women's Premiership.

== Background ==
Kiria-Ratu was born in Auckland, she is of Cook Island and Fiji descent. She moved to the Gold Coast, Queensland when she was seven years old. She played her junior rugby league for the Parkwood Sharks and attended Keebra Park State High School.

== Playing career ==
=== Early career ===
In 2022, Kiria-Ratu played for the Tweed Seagulls in the QRL Under-19s competition and the QRL Women's Premiership. At the age of 18 she turned down a place with the Kiwi Ferns in order to represent the Cook Islands at the World Cup. In 2022 and 2023, she represented Queensland Under-19.

=== Gold Coast Titans ===
In 2023, Kiria-Ratu joined Gold Coast Titans NRLW squad.

In Round 1 of the 2023 NRL Women's season, she made her NRLW debut in the Titans' 16–6 win over the North Queensland Cowboys. On 1 October 2023, she started at five-eighth in the Titans' 2023 NRL Women's Grand Final loss to the Newcastle Knights.

In May 2024, Kiria-Ratu was ruled out for the 2024 NRL Women's season after tearing her ACL.

=== Cronulla-Sutherland Sharks ===
On 21 February 2025, Kiria-Ratu signed with the Cronulla Sharks.

On 22 April 2026, she was named to make her Women's State of Origin debut for Queensland in Game I of the 2026 Women's State of Origin series.

=== International ===
In October 2026 she was selected for the Kiwi Ferns.

She made her New Zealand international début in the 2026 Rugby League World Cup 92-0 win over France on 25 October 2026, scoring a try and 9 goals.
