= Destiny Brill =

Samoa international rugby league footballer

Personal information
- Full name: Destiny Brill
- Born: 10 July 2003 (age 23) New Plymouth, New Zealand
- Height: 178 cm (5 ft 10 in)
- Weight: 73 kg (11 st 7 lb)

Playing information

Rugby union
Club
Years	Team	Pld	T	G	FG	P
2020–21	Queensland Reds

Rugby league
- Position: Hooker, Lock
Club
Years	Team	Pld	T	G	FG	P
2021	Gold Coast Titans	6	1	0	0	4
2022	Sydney Roosters	6	3	0	0	12
2023–	Brisbane Broncos	31	8	0	0	32
	Total	43	12	0	0	48
Representative
Years	Team	Pld	T	G	FG	P
2021–26	Queensland	11	2	0	0	8
2023–25	Samoa	4	0	0	0	0
2023–24	Māori All Stars	2	0	0	0	0
- Source: As of 16 November 2026

Destiny Brill (born 10 June 2003) is a Samoan professional rugby league footballer who currently plays for the Brisbane Broncos in the NRL Women's Premiership.

She is a Queensland and Samoan representative and previously played for the Gold Coast Titans and Sydney Roosters.

== Background ==
Born in New Plymouth, New Zealand, Brill grew up in Perth, Western Australia before moving to Brisbane as a teenager. In Brisbane, she attended Marsden State High School and played junior rugby league for the Wests Panthers. In Perth, she played for the South Perth Lions.

== Playing career ==
=== Rugby union ===
In 2020, Brill played for the Queensland Reds in the Super Rugby Women's, debuting at the age of 16. In 2021, she played in their Grand Final loss to New South Wales.

=== Rugby league ===
==== 2021 ====
In 2021, Brill started the season playing for Wests Panthers in the QRL's Under-19s competition before moving up to the QRL Women's Premiership with the Valleys Diehards.

On 25 June, she made her State of Origin debut for Queensland, starting at hooker and scoring the only try in their 8–6 win over New South Wales.

==== 2022 ====
Brill joined the Gold Coast Titans for the delayed 2021 NRL Women's season, making her NRLW debut in their Round 1 loss to the St George Illawarra Dragons. At the end of the season, she was named the RLPA Rookie of the Year.

After one season with the Titans, she moved to the Sydney Roosters, playing six games for them in the 2022 NRL Women's season.

==== 2023 ====
On 2 April, Brill signed with the Brisbane Broncos, playing nine games and scoring three tries in the 2023 NRL Women's season. In October, she made her Test debut for Samoa in their 26–12 win over Fiji.

==== 2024 ====
In 2024, Brill played in the first two games of the State of Origin before missing the Game III decided due to a calf injury.
