= Shaniah Power =

Australian rugby league player (born 1997)

Personal information
- Born: 20 March 1997 (age 28) Bowen, Queensland, Australia
- Height: 165 cm (5 ft 5 in)
- Weight: 74 kg (11 st 9 lb)

Playing information
- Position: Second-row
Club
Years	Team	Pld	T	G	FG	P
2020	New Zealand Warriors	2	2	0	0	8
2021	Gold Coast Titans	6	1	0	0	4
2022	Sydney Roosters	5	3	0	0	12
2023–24	Nth Qld Cowboys	10	0	0	0	0
2025	Wigan Warriors	5	1	0	0	4
	Total	28	7	0	0	28
Representative
Years	Team	Pld	T	G	FG	P
2020–23	Indigenous All Stars	4	0	0	0	0
2020–23	Queensland	4	0	0	0	0
- Source: RLP As of 19 February 2026

Shaniah Power (born 20 March 1997) is an Australian rugby league footballer who last played as a second-row for the Wigan Warriors in the RFL Women's Super League.

She previously played for the New Zealand Warriors, Gold Coast Titans, Sydney Roosters and Nth Qld Cowboys.

== Background ==
Power was born in Bowen, Queensland and began playing rugby league for the Proserpine Brahmans.

== Playing career ==
In 2019, while playing in Townsville for the Western Lions, Power represented Queensland Country at the Women's National Championships.

=== 2020 ===
On 22 February, Power represented the Indigenous All Stars in their win over the Māori All Stars. In March, she joined the North Queensland Gold Stars for their first QRL Women's Premiership season but did not play a game before the season was cancelled. She later played for the Wests Panthers in the Holcim Cup.

In September, she joined the New Zealand Warriors NRL Women's Premiership team. In Round 1 of the 2020 NRLW season, she made her debut for the Warriors in their 28–14 loss to the Brisbane Broncos. In Round 3, she scored two tries in their win over the St. George Illawarra Dragons.

On 13 November, she made her State of Origin debut for Queensland in their win over New South Wales.

=== 2021 ===
On 20 February, Power represented the Indigenous All Stars in their 24–0 loss to the Māori All Stars.

=== 2023 ===
On 12 April, Power signed with her hometown club, the Nth Qld Cowboys, on a two-year deal.

In Round 1 of the 2023 NRL Women's season, she made her debut for the Cowboys, starting at second-row in a 16–6 loss to the Gold Coast Titans.

On 22 August, she was ruled out for the remainder of the 2023 season with a foot injury.

=== 2024 ===
On 25 May, Power started at second-row in the Mackay Cutters' QRLW Grand Final win over the Norths Devils.

In Round 2 of the 2024 NRL Women's season, she made her first appearance of the season for the Cowboys, coming off the bench in a 38–34 win over the St George Illawarra Dragons.

=== 2025 ===
On 24 February 2025 she signed for Wigan Warriors in the RFL Women's Super League

She won the treble winners in her first season with the club.

On 24 November 2025 it was reported that she had returned to Australia
