= Gold Coast Titans Women =

Australian rugby league club, based on the Gold Coast, QLD

Club information
- Full name: Gold Coast Titans
- Nickname: Titans
- Short name: GOL
- Colours: Light blue Gold; White
- Founded: 2022; 4 years ago
- Website: titans.com.au

Current details
- Ground: Robina Stadium (27,350)
- CEO: Steve Mitchell
- Coach: Karyn Murphy
- Captain: Georgia Hale
- Competition: National Rugby League
- 2023 season: 2nd
- Current season

Records
- Premierships: 0
- Runners-up: 1 (2023)
- Minor premierships: 0
- Biggest win: Titans 58 – 0 Tigers; Campbelltown Stadium (6 Sep 2026)
- Biggest loss: Titans 4 – 44 Broncos; Totally Workwear Stadium (11 Aug 2024); Titans 4 – 44 Broncos; Cbus Super Stadium (13 Jul 2025)
- First game: Titans 12 – 20 Dragons; McDonald Jones Stadium (27 Feb 2022)
- Wooden spoons: 1 (2022)
- Most capped: 53 – Georgia Hale
- Highest try scorer: 23 – Jaime Chapman
- Highest points scorer: 205 – Lauren Brown

The Gold Coast Titans Women are a professional rugby league football club, based on the Gold Coast, Queensland, Australia. The team is part of the Gold Coast Titans club and plays in the National Rugby League Women's Premiership (NRLW), Australia's premier club competition for women. On 11 June 2021, the NRL announced that the club's application for a licence to join the NRLW had been accepted, as part of the expansion of the competition for the 2021 season. A few days later, on 14 June 2021, Jamie Feeney was announced as the inaugural coach of the Titans Women's team.

In early September 2021, the NRL announced that due to border restrictions then in place to mitigate COVID-19, the 2021 season would be postponed to early in the new year. The Titans Women played their first game on 27 February 2022. The team's first win came the following week, in Round 2, 26–16, over the eventual premiers, the Sydney Roosters.

== Seasons ==
Season	Regular season								Finals		Ref
Season	P	W	D	L	F	A	Pts	Pos	Top	Placing	Ref
2021	5	3	0	2	94	96	6	3rd	4	Semi-finalist	
2022	5	1	0	4	58	118	2	6th	4	—	
2023	9	7	0	2	164	126	14	3rd	4	Grand finalist	
2024	9	3	0	6	128	191	6	8th	4	—	
2025	11	5	1	5	171	194	11	6th	6	Elimination finalist	
2026	11	10	0	1	342	158	20	2nd	6	Preliminary finalist	

=== 2026 draw ===
The draw for the 2026 season was announced on 14 November 2025.

Round	Opponent	Score	Date	Time	Venue	
1	Roosters	10–34	Sat 4 Jul 2026	12:45 PM	Home	Cbus Super Stadium
2	Bulldogs	36–10	Sat 11 Jul 2026	3:15 PM	Away	Accor Stadium
3	Eels	50–12	Sun 19 Jul 2026	11:50 AM	Home	Cbus Super Stadium
4	Cowboys	34–6	Sat 25 Jul 2026	5:15 PM	Away	Queensland Country Bank Stadium
5	Warriors	18–16	Sun 2 Aug 2026	1:45 PM	Neutral	Geohex Stadium, Wagga Wagga
6	Sharks	24–10	Sat 8 Aug 2026	3:15 PM	Away	Sharks Stadium
7	Dragons	26–10	Sat 15 Aug 2026	12:45 PM	Home	Cbus Super Stadium
8	Broncos	28–20	Sun 23 Aug 2026	11:50 AM	Home	Cbus Super Stadium
9	Raiders	26–20	Sat 29 Aug 2026	12:45 PM	Home	Cbus Super Stadium
10	Tigers	58–0	Sun 6 Sep 2026	1:45 PM	Away	Campbelltown Sports Ground
11	Knights	32–20	Sun 13 Sep 2026	1:45 PM	Away	McDonald Jones Stadium
FW2	Broncos	8–20	Sun 20 Sep 2026	1:05 PM	Home	Cbus Super Stadium

== Head-to-head records ==
Opponent	First meeting	P	W	D	L	For	Agst	Win %	Share %
Dragons	27 Feb 2022	7	4	0	3	131	116	57.14%	53.04%
Roosters	6 Mar 2022	7	3	0	4	102	148	42.86%	40.80%
Eels	13 Mar 2022	6	4	0	2	156	98	66.67%	61.42%
Broncos	19 Mar 2022	7	3	0	4	93	192	42.86%	32.63%
Knights	27 Mar 2022	8	2	0	6	138	200	25.00%	40.83%
Cowboys	22 Jul 2023	4	2	0	2	66	43	50.00%	60.55%
Sharks	5 Aug 2023	4	2	0	2	48	52	50.00%	48.00%
Tigers	3 Sep 2023	4	4	0	0	126	28	100.00%	81.82%
Raiders	17 Sep 2023	4	3	0	1	85	58	75.00%	59.44%
Warriors	26 Jul 2025	2	2	0	0	38	26	100.00%	59.38%
Bulldogs	2 Aug 2025	2	1	1	0	50	24	75.00%	67.57%
Totals	27 Feb 2022	55	30	1	24	1033	985	55.45%	51.19%

Notes

- Share % is the percentage of points For over the sum of points For and Against.
- Clubs listed in the order than the Titans Women first played them.
- As of 28 September 2026

== Coach ==
In early May 2022, the club announced that Karyn Murphy would coach the Titans Women in the 2022 season.
As of 28 September 2026.

Coach	Season span	M	W	D	L	For	Agst	Win %	Share %	Ref
Jamie Feeney	2021	6	3	0	3	122	120	50.00%	50.41%	
Karyn Murphy	2022–2026	49	27	1	21	921	865	56.12%	51.57%	

== Captains ==
All players who have captained the Gold Coast Titans NRLW team.
As of 28 September 2026

C#	Name	Years as captain	Debut		Games as captain			Games for club	Ref
C#	Name	Years as captain	Date	Round	Solo	Joint	Total	Games for club	Ref
1	Brittany Breayley-Nati	2021–2022	27 Feb 2022	1	11	0	11	34	
2	Georgia Hale	2023–present	22 Jul 2023	1	43	0	43	53	
3	Lauren Brown	2025	20 Jul 2025	3	1	0	1	47	

== Current squad ==
Jersey numbers in the table reflect the team list announced for Finals Week 1.
Table last updated on 28 September 2026.

J#	Player	Age	Position(s)	NRLW seasons				NRLW stats					Origin	Tests	All Stars
J#	Player	Age	Position(s)	Debut	2018-24	2025	2026	M	T	G	Pts	Prems	Origin	Tests	All Stars
1	Lily Patston	25	Fullback, Wing	2025	—	4	11	15	3	0	12	—	—	—	—
2	Destiny Mino-Sinapati	21	Wing, Centre	2023	10	3	4	17	9	0	36	—	1	3	—
3	Jaime Chapman	24	Centre, Fullback	2020	9 5 17	5	11	47	30	0	120	—	11	5	6
4	Georgia Grey	22	Centre, Wing	2024	8	11	9	28	17	0	68	—	—	—	—
5	Indie Bostock	19	Wing, Centre	2025	—	7	11	18	11	0	44	—	—	—	—
6	Teagan Levi	23	Prop	2026	—	RU	12	12	9	0	36	—	—	—	—
7	Lauren Brown	31	Halfback, Hooker	2020	10 23	12	12	57	7	108	247	1	12	7	—
8	Laikha Clarke	24	Prop	2021	19	10	12	41	6	0	24	—	—	4	3
9	Georgia Hale	31	Hooker, Lock	2018	9 30	11	12	62	3	0	12	—	—	24	—
10	Fanua Rimoni	19	Prop	2026	—	R	9	9	0	0	0	—	—	—	—
11	Evania Isa'ako	31	Second-row, Wing	2020	3 30	P	12	45	21	0	84	—	6	4 2	—
12	Ivana Lolesio	22	Second-row, Centre	2025	—	12	12	24	3	0	12	—	3	—	—
13	Sienna Lofipo	21	Lock, Prop	2023	14	10	12	36	6	0	24	—	7	5	—
14	Lily Kolc	21	Hooker	2024	7	11	11	29	3	0	12	—	—	—	—
15	Eta Sikahele	19	Second-row	2026	—	R	9	9	0	0	0	—	—	—	—
20	Jasmine Solia	29	Second-row, Lock	2022	14	11	7	32	3	0	12	—	—	3 1	—
17	Takoda Thompson	20	Second-row, Prop	2025	—	10	12	22	1	0	4	—	—	—	—
18	Pauline Piliae-Rasabale	34	Five-eighth, Centre	2023	18	6	1	25	2	28	64	—	—	5	—
19	Aleksandra Tunufai	21	Centre	2026	—	R	1	1	0	0	0	—	—	—	—
16	Sarina Masaga	21	Centre, Second-row	2024	3	8	6	17	3	0	12	—	—	5	—
21	Enah Desic	18	Halfback	2026	—	R	1	1	0	0	0	—	—	—	—
22	Jessika Elliston	28	Prop, Second-row	2019	5 31	12	1	49	6	0	24	2	13	5	—
–	Sienna Ibrahim	19	Wing	2016	—	R	1	1	2	0	8	—	—	1	—
–	Lorren Ieli	19	Second-row	—	—	R	—	0	0	0	0	—	—	—	—
–	Rilee Jorgensen	21	Second-row, Prop	2023	12	H	—	12	0	2	4	—	—	—	—
–	Lailani Montgomery	21	Fullback, Five-eighth	2024	5	10	1	16	0	0	0	—	—	—	2
–	Natasha Penitani	26	Prop	2024	9	12	5	26	1	0	4	—	—	5	—
–	Keira Rangi	19	Second-row	—	—	R	—	0	0	0	0	—	—	1	—
IJ	Phoenix-Raine Hippi	20	Centre, Wing	2025	—	7	10	17	15	0	60	—	1	—	1
DV	Lilianah Lewis	—	Halfback	—	—	—	—	0	0	0	0	—	—	—	—
DV	Joshalynn Walker	18	Fullback	—	—	U	—	0	0	0	0	—	—	—	—
–	Torah Luadaka	18	Halfback	—	—	—	—	0	0	0	0	—	—	—	—

Notes:

- Lily Patston has been signed on a supplementary contact for 2026.
- The following players have been signed on a development contract for 2026:
  - Enah Desic
  - Torah Luadaka
  - Keira Rangi
  - Joshalynn Walker
  - Sienna Ibrahim
- Te Ngaroahiahi Fanua Awhina Rimoni was initially signed on a development contract for 2026 but was upgraded in late March to a full contract.
- The following players were signed on a development contract for 2025:
  - Estanoa Faitala-Mariner (returning from injury)
  - Phoenix-Raine Hippi
  - Savannah Roberts-Hickling
  - Eta-Fusi Sikahele
- Evania Isa'ako (née Pelite) missed the 2025 season due to pregnancy.

The Gold Coast Titans announced contract extensions in several instalments from October 2025. The Gold Coast Titans announced player signings in several instalments from March 2026.

=== Players extended ===
- Takoda Thompson(2027)

=== Players out ===
- Destiny Mino-Sinapati to Broncos

Released

- Aleksandra Tunufai

Off contract

- Laikha Clarke
- Enah Desic
- Georgia Grey
- Georgia Hale
- Rilee Jorgensen
- Teagan Levi
- Lailani Montgomery
- Te Ngaroahiahi Fanua Awhina Rimoni
- Pauline Piliae-Rasabale
- Jasmine Solia
- Sienna Ibrahim (Dev)
- Lily Patston (Sup)

==== Off contract after 2027 ====
- Indie Bostock
- Lauren Brown
- Jaime Chapman
- Phoenix-Raine Hippi
- Lily Kolc
- Ivana Lolesio
- Sarina Masaga
- Evania Pelite
- Natasha Penitani
- Eta Sikahele
- Takoda Thompson

== Individual awards ==
The Gold Coast Titans individual award winners since their entry into the NRLW in the (postponed) 2021 season.

Season	Player of the Year	Players' Player	Members' Award	Rookie	Effort Player of the Year	Wellbeing & Education Award	Coach's Award	Ref
2021	Jessika Elliston	—	—	—	—	—	—	
2022	Shannon Mato	—	Evania Isa'ako	—	—	—	Georgia Hale	
2023	Shannon Mato	—	Evania Isa'ako	Chantay Kiria-Ratu	—	—	Georgia Hale	
2024	Evania Isa'ako	Evania Isa'ako	Evania Isa'ako	Georgia Grey	—	—	—	
2025	Jessika Elliston	Jessika Elliston	Lily Kolc	Ivana Lolesio	Shaylee Bent	Georgia Grey	—	
2026	Teagan Levi & Sienna Lofipo	Georgia Hale	Teagan Levi	Fanua Rimoni	Evania Isa'ako	Jaime Chapman	–	

== Club records ==
Win-loss record since entering the NRLW in 2021

Games	Wins	Drawn	Loss	Points for	Points against	+/-	Win %
55	30	1	24	1,033	985	+48	55.45%

=== Player records ===
Lists and tables last updated: 28 September 2026.

==== Career records (at the Titans) ====
===== Most games for the Titans =====
Qualification: 20 games

Rank	Player	Span	Games
1	Georgia Hale	2021–present	53
2	Lauren Brown	2022–present	47
3	Jessika Elliston	2021–present	44
4	Evania Isa'ako	2021–present	42
5	Laikha Clarke	2021–present	41
6	Sienna Lofipo	2023–present	36
7	Brittany Breayley-Nati	2021–2025	34
8	Jaime Chapman	2023–present	33
9	Shaylee Bent	2023–2025	32
10	Lily Kolc	2024–present	29
11	Georgia Grey	2024–present	28
12	Shannon Mato	2021–2024	27
13	Zara Canfield	2021–2024	24
13	Ivana Lolesio	2025–present	24
15	Karina Brown	2021–2024	22
15	Stephanie Hancock	2021–2023	22
15	Takoda Thompson	2025–present	22

===== Most points for the Titans =====
Qualification: 20 points

Rank	Player	2026 club	M	T	G	FG	Points
1	Lauren Brown		47	6	89	3	205
2	Jaime Chapman		33	23	0	0	92
3	Evania Isa'ako		42	18	0	0	72
4	Georgia Grey		28	17	0	0	68
5	Phoenix-Raine Hippi		17	15	0	0	60
6	Destiny Mino-Sinapati		17	9	0	0	36
6	Teagan Levi		12	9	0	0	36
8	Stephanie Hancock	R	22	8	0	0	32
8	Emily Bass		11	8	0	0	32
8	Indie Bostock		11	8	0	0	32
11	Zara Canfield	R	24	3	8	0	28
12	Jessika Elliston		44	6	0	0	24
12	Laikha Clarke		41	6	0	0	24
12	Sienna Lofipo		36	6	0	0	24

===== Most tries for the Titans =====
Qualification: 5 tries

Rank	Player	Tries
1	Jaime Chapman	23
2	Evania Isa'ako	18
3	Georgia Grey	17
4	Phoenix-Raine Hippi	15
5	Destiny Mino-Sinapati	9
5	Teagan Levi	9
7	Stephanie Hancock	8
7	Emily Bass	8
7	Indie Bostock	8
10	Jessika Elliston	6
10	Laikha Clarke	6
10	Lauren Brown	6
10	Sienna Lofipo	6

===== Most goals for the Titans =====
All goal kickers

Rank	Player	Goals
1	Lauren Brown	89
2	Zara Canfield	8
3	Brianna Clark	7
4	Kimiora Breayley-Nati	4
5	Rilee Jorgensen	2
5	Chantay Kiria-Ratu	2
7	Tiana Raftstrand-Smith	1

===== Most field goals for the Titans =====
Three instances from the same player

Rank	Player	Field goals
1	Lauren Brown	3

==== Season records ====
Season length has increased over time as the competition has expanded.

===== Most points in a season for the Titans =====
Qualification: 18 points

Rank	Player	Season	M	T	G	FG	Points
1	Lauren Brown	2026	12	1	39	0	82
2	Lauren Brown	2025	12	1	21	1	47
3	Jaime Chapman	2023	9	9	0	0	36
3	Phoenix-Raine Hippi	2025	7	9	0	0	36
3	Jaime Chapman	2026	11	9	0	0	36
3	Teagan Levi	2026	12	9	0	0	36
7	Lauren Brown	2024	7	3	11	0	34
8	Georgia Grey	2025	11	8	0	0	32
8	Indie Bostock	2026	11	8	0	0	32
8	Evania Isa'ako	2026	12	8	0	0	32
11	Lauren Brown	2023	11	1	11	2	28
11	Georgia Grey	2026	9	7	0	0	28
13	Emily Bass	2024	7	6	0	0	24
13	Phoenix-Raine Hippi	2026	10	6	0	0	24
13	Destiny Mino-Sinapati	2026	4	6	0	0	24
16	Evania Pelite	2023	11	5	0	0	20
17	Zara Canfield	2023	10	2	5	0	18

===== Most tries in a season for the Titans =====
Qualification: 4 tries

Rank	Player	Season	M	Tries
1	Jaime Chapman	2023	9	9
1	Phoenix-Raine Hippi	2025	7	9
1	Jaime Chapman	2026	11	9
1	Teagan Levi	2026	12	9
5	Georgia Grey	2025	11	8
5	Indie Bostock	2026	11	8
5	Evania Isa'ako	2026	12	8
8	Georgia Grey	2026	9	7
9	Emily Bass	2024	7	6
9	Phoenix-Raine Hippi	2026	10	6
9	Destiny Mino-Sinapati	2026	4	6
12	Evania Pelite	2023	11	5
13	Stephanie Hancock	2021	6	4
13	Jasmine Peters	2021	5	4
13	Stephanie Hancock	2022	5	4
13	Evania Pelite	2024	9	4

==== Match records ====
===== Most points in a game =====
Qualification: 12 points

Rank	Player	Date	Opponent	Venue	T	G	FG	Points
1	Lauren Brown	6 Sep 2026	Tigers	Campbelltown Stadium	1	9	0	22
2	Jaime Chapman	11 Jul 2026	Bulldogs	Accor Stadium	4	0	0	16
3	Lauren Brown	25 Aug 2024	Roosters	Cbus Super Stadium	2	3	0	14
4	Jaime Chapman	10 Sep 2023	Eels	Cbus Super Stadium	3	0	0	12
4	Jaime Chapman	1 Oct 2023	Knights	Accor Stadium	3	0	0	12
4	Jaime Chapman	3 Aug 2024	Tigers	Cbus Super Stadium	3	0	0	12
4	Emily Bass	28 Jul 2024	Dragons	WIN Stadium	3	0	0	12
4	Georgia Grey	23 Aug 2025	Dragons	Cbus Super Stadium	3	0	0	12
4	Jaime Chapman	6 Sep 2026	Tigers	Campbelltown Stadium	3	0	0	12

===== Most tries in a game =====
Qualification: 3 tries

Rank	Player	Date	Opponent	Venue	Tries
1	Jaime Chapman	11 Jul 2026	Bulldogs	Accor Stadium	4
2	Jaime Chapman	10 Sep 2023	Eels	Cbus Super Stadium	3
2	Jaime Chapman	1 Oct 2023	Knights	Accor Stadium	3
2	Emily Bass	28 Jul 2024	Dragons	WIN Stadium	3
2	Jaime Chapman	3 Aug 2024	Tigers	Cbus Super Stadium	3
2	Georgia Grey	23 Aug 2025	Dragons	Cbus Super Stadium	3
2	Jaime Chapman	6 Sep 2026	Tigers	Campbelltown Stadium	3

==== Oldest and youngest players ====
The oldest and youngest players to represent the Gold Coast Titans NRLW team.

Name	Age	Year
Steph Hancock	41 and 206 days	2023
Hailee-Jay Ormond-Maunsell	18 and 19 days	2022

==== First try and last try ====
Player who scored the first try and most recent try for the Sharks.

Name	Year	Round	Minute	Opponent
Tiana Raftstrand-Smith	2021	1	56'	Dragons
Evania Isa'ako	2026	PF	53'	Broncos

=== Margins and streaks ===
Biggest winning margins
Qualification: 14 point margin

Margin	Score	Opponent	Venue	Date	Round
58	58–0	Tigers	Campbelltown Stadium	6 Sep 2026	10
38	50–12	Eels	Cbus Super Stadium	19 Jul 2026	3
28	34–6	Cowboys	Queensland Country Bank Stadium	25 Jul 2026	4
26	36–10	Bulldogs	Accor Stadium	11 Jul 2026	2
24	30–6	Raiders	GIO Stadium	17 Sep 2023	9
22	34–12	Eels	Cbus Super Stadium	10 Sep 2023	8
20	26–6	Roosters	Cbus Super Stadium	25 Aug 2024	5
18	22–4	Dragons	Cbus Super Stadium	23 Aug 2025	8
16	26–10	Eels	Cbus Super Stadium	31 Aug 2025	9
16	28–12	Tigers	Cbus Super Stadium	3 Aug 2024	2
16	26–10	Dragons	Cbus Super Stadium	15 Aug 2026	7
14	24–10	Sharks	Ocean Protect Stadium	8 Aug 2026	6

Biggest losing margins
Qualification: 14 point margin

Margin	Score	Opponent	Venue	Date	Round
40	4–44	Broncos	Totally Workwear Stadium	11 Aug 2024	3
40	4–44	Broncos	Cbus Super Stadium	13 Jul 2025	2
36	10–46	Knights	Cbus Super Stadium	14 Sep 2024	8
26	12–38	Roosters	Central Coast Stadium	18 Sep 2022	5
24	10–34	Roosters	Cbus Super Stadium	4 Jul 2026	1
22	8–30	Roosters	Cbus Super Stadium	19 Aug 2023	5
18	4–22	Broncos	Cbus Super Stadium	3 Sep 2022	3
16	8–24	Roosters	Cbus Super Stadium	10 Aug 2025	6
16	6–22	Sharks	Cbus Super Stadium	31 Aug 2024	6
14	12–26	Dragons	WIN Stadium	21 Aug 2022	1
14	20–34	Knights	McDonald Jones Stadium	20 Sep 2025	Elimination Final
14	6–20	Cowboys	Queensland Country Bank Stadium	5 Jul 2025	1

Most consecutive wins

- 10 (11 July 2026 – 13 September 2026)
- 5 (26 August 2023 – 24 September 2023)

Most consecutive losses

- 6 (31 August 2024 – 22 September 2024, 5 July 2025 – 13 July 2025)
- 4 (3 April 2022, 21 August 2022 – 3 September 2022)

Biggest comeback

- Recovered from 10 point deficit. Trailed Brisbane Broncos 0-10 after 13 minutes at The GABBA on July 27, 2023 and won 17-16.

Worst collapse

- Surrendered 8 point lead. Led Newcastle Knights 8-0 after 24 minutes in 2023 NRL Women's Grand Final on October 1, 2023 and lost 18-24.

== History ==
First game and first won

Result	Score	Opponent	Venue	Date	Round	Ref
Lost	12–20	St George Illawarra Dragons	McDonald Jones Stadium	27 Feb 2022	1	
Won	26–16	Sydney Roosters	WIN Stadium	6 Mar 2026	2	

=== First team ===
The first Gold Coast Titans team who played the St George Illawarra Dragons on 27 February 2022 at McDonald Jones Stadium. The Dragons won the match 20-12.

Jersey	Position	Player
1	Fullback	Evania Isa'ako
2	Wing	Karina Brown
3	Centre	Tiana Raftstrand-Smith
4	Centre	Lauren Dam
5	Wing	Jetaya Faifua
6	Five-eighth	Grace Griffin
7	Halfback	Kimiora Breayley-Nati
8	Prop	Shannon Mato
9	Hooker	Brittany Breayley-Nati (c)
10	Prop	Brianna Clark
11	Second-row	Zara Canfield
12	Second-row	Tazmin Rapana
13	Lock	Georgia Hale (rugby league)
14	Hooker	Destiny Brill
15	Prop	Jessika Elliston
16	Prop	Steph Hancock
17	Second-row	Shaniah Power
	Coach	Jamie Feeney

=== Grand Final appearances ===
Result	Score	Opponent	Venue	Date	Ref
Lost	18–24	Newcastle Knights	Accor Stadium	1 Oct 2023	

== Players ==
The following players have appeared in NRL Women's Premiership matches for the Titans.
Table last updated: 28 September 2026.

Order	Player	Titans					First appearance
Order	Player	M	T	G	FG	Pts	Game	Date	Opponent
1	Karina Brown	22	3	0	0	12	1	27 Feb 2022	Dragons
2	Brittany Breayley-Nati	34	3	0	0	12	1	27 Feb 2022	Dragons
3	Tazmin Rapana	4	1	0	0	4	1	27 Feb 2022	Dragons
4	Grace Griffin	4	0	0	0	0	1	27 Feb 2022	Dragons
5	Georgia Hale	53	1	0	0	4	1	27 Feb 2022	Dragons
6	Stephanie Hancock	22	8	0	0	32	1	27 Feb 2022	Dragons
7	Kimiora Breayley-Nati	11	0	4	0	8	1	27 Feb 2022	Dragons
8	Destiny Brill	6	1	0	0	4	1	27 Feb 2022	Dragons
9	Zara Canfield	24	3	8	0	28	1	27 Feb 2022	Dragons
10	Brianna Clark	4	0	7	0	14	1	27 Feb 2022	Dragons
11	Lauren Dam	2	0	0	0	0	1	27 Feb 2022	Dragons
12	Jessika Elliston	44	6	0	0	24	1	27 Feb 2022	Dragons
13	Jetaya Faifua	7	1	0	0	4	1	27 Feb 2022	Dragons
14	Shannon Mato	27	3	0	0	12	1	27 Feb 2022	Dragons
15	Evania Isa'ako	42	18	0	0	72	1	27 Feb 2022	Dragons
16	Shaniah Power	6	1	0	0	4	1	27 Feb 2022	Dragons
17	Tiana Raftstrand-Smith	11	1	1	0	6	1	27 Feb 2022	Dragons
18	Jasmine Peters	8	4	0	0	16	2	6 Mar 2022	Roosters
19	April Ngatupuna	6	0	0	0	0	2	6 Mar 2022	Roosters
20	Hailee-Jay Ormond-Maunsell	11	4	0	0	16	3	13 Mar 2022	Eels
21	Laikha Clarke	41	6	0	0	24	3	13 Mar 2022	Eels
22	Cobie-Jane Morgan	3	0	0	0	0	4	19 Mar 2022	Broncos
23	Apii Nicholls	5	0	0	0	0	7	21 Aug 2022	Dragons
24	Madison Bartlett	5	3	0	0	12	7	21 Aug 2022	Dragons
25	Lauren Brown	47	6	89	3	205	7	21 Aug 2022	Dragons
26	Rona Peters	2	0	0	0	0	7	21 Aug 2022	Dragons
27	Roxy Murdoch-Masila	2	0	0	0	0	7	21 Aug 2022	Dragons
28	Hagiga Mosby	2	0	0	0	0	8	28 Aug 2022	Knights
29	Annette Brander	1	0	0	0	0	9	3 Sep 2022	Broncos
30	Destiny Mino-Sinapati	17	9	0	0	36	12	22 Jul 2023	Cowboys
31	Jaime Chapman	33	23	0	0	92	12	22 Jul 2023	Cowboys
32	Niall Williams-Guthrie	17	2	0	0	8	12	22 Jul 2023	Cowboys
33	Emily Bass	11	8	0	0	32	12	22 Jul 2023	Cowboys
34	Taliah Fuimaono	16	3	0	0	12	12	22 Jul 2023	Cowboys
35	Chantay Kiria-Ratu	11	2	2	0	12	12	22 Jul 2023	Cowboys
36	Shaylee Bent	32	3	0	0	12	12	22 Jul 2023	Cowboys
37	Kaitlyn Phillips	3	0	0	0	0	12	22 Jul 2023	Cowboys
38	Sienna Lofipo	36	6	0	0	24	13	27 Jul 2023	Broncos
39	Rilee Jorgensen	12	0	2	0	4	13	27 Jul 2023	Broncos
40	Dannii Perese	13	1	0	0	4	13	27 Jul 2023	Broncos
41	Sophie Buller	1	0	0	0	0	13	26 Aug 2023	Dragons
42	Lily Kolc	29	3	0	0	12	23	28 Jul 2024	Dragons
43	Georgia Grey	28	17	0	0	68	24	3 Aug 2024	Wests Tigers
44	Ngatokotoru Arakua	5	1	0	0	4	25	11 Aug 2024	Broncos
45	Lailani Montgomery	16	0	0	0	0	26	17 Aug 2024	Cowboys
46	Matekino Gray	4	0	0	0	0	26	17 Aug 2024	Cowboys
47	Sarina Masaga	17	3	0	0	12	28	8 Sep 2024	Eels
48	Georgia Sim	1	0	0	0	0	29	14 Sep 2024	Knights
49	Kayla Jackson	2	0	0	0	0	32	5 Jul 2025	Cowboys
50	Ivana Lolesio	24	3	0	0	12	32	5 Jul 2025	Cowboys
51	Natasha Penitani	17	1	0	0	4	32	5 Jul 2025	Cowboys
52	Pauline Piliae-Rasabale	7	1	0	0	4	32	5 Jul 2025	Cowboys
53	Jasmine Solia	18	3	0	0	12	32	5 Jul 2025	Cowboys
54	Lily Patston	15	3	0	0	12	33	13 Jul 2025	Broncos
55	Megan Pakulis	4	0	0	0	0	33	13 Jul 2025	Broncos
56	Takoda Thompson	22	1	0	0	4	33	13 Jul 2025	Broncos
57	Phoenix-Raine Hippi	17	15	0	0	60	37	10 Aug 2025	Roosters
58	Estanoa Faitala-Mariner	5	1	0	0	4	38	16 Aug 2025	Sharks
59	Jasmin Morrissey	1	0	0	0	0	41	7 Sep 2025	Knights
60	Kelsey Parkin	1	0	0	0	0	41	7 Sep 2025	Knights
61	Teagan Levi	12	9	0	0	36	44	4 Jul 2026	Roosters
62	Indie Bostock	11	8	0	0	32	45	11 Jul 2026	Bulldogs
63	Fanua Rimoni	9	0	0	0	0	45	11 Jul 2026	Bulldogs
64	Eta Sikahele	9	0	0	0	0	47	25 Jul 2026	Cowboys
65	Enah Desic	1	0	0	0	0	48	2 Aug 2026	Warriors
66	Aleksandra Tunufai	1	0	0	0	0	48	2 Aug 2026	Warriors
67	Sienna Ibrahim	1	2	0	0	8	49	8 Aug 2026	Sharks

== Representative honours ==
=== National team representatives ===
Player	Club debut	Country	International debut	Years	Ref
Ngatokotoru Arakua	11 Aug 2024	Cook Islands	**22 Oct 2023**	2025	
Madison Bartlett	21 Aug 2022	New Zealand	**22 Jun 2019**	2022	
Kimiora Breayley-Nati	27 Feb 2022	Cook Islands	2 Nov 2022	2022	
Lauren Brown	21 Aug 2022	Australia	2 Nov 2022	2022–2023	
Jaime Chapman	22 Jul 2023	Australia	**6 Nov 2022**	2023	
Laikha Clarke	13 Mar 2022	Samoa	19 Oct 2024	2024–2025	
Jessika Elliston	27 Feb 2022	Australia	14 Oct 2023	2023–2025	
Taliah Fuimaono	22 Jul 2023	Samoa	**22 Jun 2019**	2025	
Georgia Hale	27 Feb 2022	New Zealand	**3 May 2015**	2022–2025	
Chantay Kiria-Ratu	22 Jul 2023	Cook Islands	**2 Nov 2022**	2023	
Sienna Lofipo	27 Jul 2023	Samoa	15 Oct 2023	2023–2025	
Sarina Masaga	8 Sep 2024	Samoa	19 Oct 2024	2024–2025	
Shannon Mato	27 Feb 2022	Australia	2 Nov 2022	2022–2025	
Destiny Mino-Sinapati	22 Jul 2023	Samoa	15 Oct 2023	2023, 2025	
April Ngatupuna	6 Mar 2022	Cook Islands	2 Nov 2022	2022	
Apii Nicholls	21 Aug 2022	New Zealand	**16 Nov 2017**	2022	
Hailee-Jay Ormond-Maunsell	13 Mar 2022	New Zealand	6 Nov 2022	2022	
Megan Pakulis	13 Jul 2025	Canada	**16 Nov 2017**	2025	
Evania Pelite	27 Feb 2022	Australia	2 Nov 2022	2022	
Evania Pelite	27 Feb 2022	Samoa	19 Oct 2024	2024	
Natasha Penitani	5 Jul 2025	Tonga	**25 Jun 2022**	2025	
Dannii Perese	27 Jul 2023	Tonga	21 Oct 2023	2023–2024	
Pauline Piliae-Rasabale	5 Jul 2025	Samoa	**15 Oct 2023**	2025	
Niall Williams-Guthrie	22 Jul 2023	Samoa	15 Oct 2023	2023	

Notes:

- International Debut dates in **bold** indicate that the player made her first international appearance prior to playing for the Gold Coast Titans NRLW team.
- Shaylee Bent was selected for Australia in 2023 but was an unused 18th player in two matches.
- Malaela Sua was on a Titans development contract in 2023, prior to making her debut for Samoa on 15 October 2023.

=== Test captains ===
Name	Country	Year
Georgia Hale	New Zealand	2021-2025
Natasha Penitani	Tonga	2025

=== Women's State of Origin representatives ===
Past and current players who have played for Queensland and New South Wales in the State of Origin.

Player	State	Year(s)
Emily Bass	Queensland	2023–2024
Destiny Brill	Queensland	2022
Lauren Brown	Queensland	2024–2025
Jessika Elliston	Queensland	2022–2025
Sienna Lofipo	Queensland	2023–2025
Shannon Mato	Queensland	2022–2024
Evania Pelite	Queensland	2022–2024
Tiana Raftstrand-Smith	Queensland	2022
Shaylee Bent	New South Wales	2023
Jaime Chapman	New South Wales	2023–2025
Taliah Fuimaono	New South Wales	2023–2024

=== Prime Minister's XIII representatives ===
Past and current players who have been selected to play in the Prime Minister's XIII.

Player	Year(s)
Jaime Chapman	2024–2025
Shaylee Bent	2024–2025
Lauren Brown	2024
Phoenix-Raine Hippi	2025

=== All-Stars representatives ===
Past and current players who have played for the Indigenous All-Stars or for the Māori All-Stars.

==== Indigenous All Stars ====
Player	Year(s)
Jaime Chapman	2024–2026
Taliah Fuimaono	2024–2025
Shaylee Bent	2024, 2026
Lailani Montgomery	2025–2026
Phoenix-Raine Hippi	2026

==== Māori All Stars (Māori people) ====
Player	Year(s)
Shannon Mato	2023–2025
Laikha Clarke	2023, 2025, 2026
