= Georgia Hale (rugby league) =

New Zealand international rugby league footballer

Personal information
- Born: 9 August 1995 (age 31) Auckland, New Zealand
- Height: 165 cm (5 ft 5 in)
- Weight: 70 kg (11 st 0 lb)

Playing information
- Position: Lock, Halfback, Five-eighth
Club
Years	Team	Pld	T	G	FG	P
2018–20	New Zealand Warriors	9	2	0	0	8
2021–22	Gold Coast Titans	10	0	0	0	0
2023	Leeds Rhinos	1	0	0	0	0
2023–	Gold Coast Titans	31	1	0	0	4
	Total	51	3	0	0	12
Representative
Years	Team	Pld	T	G	FG	P
2015–26	New Zealand	28	0	0	0	0
2019	New Zealand 9s	4	0	0	0	0
- Source: RLP As of 15 November 2026

Georgia Hale (born 9 August 1995) is a New Zealand rugby league footballer who captains the Gold Coast Titans in the NRLW.

Primarily a lock, she is captain of the Gold Coast Titans team and vice-captain of the New Zealand Test team.

== Background ==
A Richmond Roses junior, Hale represented New Zealand in touch and tag football before switching to rugby league.

== Playing career ==
In 2014, she was a member of the New Zealand squad for their three-game series against Australia at the 2014 NRL Auckland Nines.

On 3 May 2015, she made her Test debut for New Zealand, coming off the bench in a 14–22 loss to Australia at Suncorp Stadium. On 6 May 2016, she was named Player of the Match in New Zealand's 26–16 ANZAC Test win over Australia. On 16 September 2016, she was named New Zealand Player of the Year at the RLPA Players' Champion awards in Sydney.

In 2017, she was named vice-captain of New Zealand for the 2017 Women's Rugby League World Cup. She played three games in the tournament but was omitted from the team that lost to Australia in the final.

=== 2018 ===
In 2018, Hale joined the New Zealand Warriors for the inaugural season of the NRL Women's Premiership. In Round 1 of the 2018 NRL Women's season, she made her debut for the Warriors, starting at halfback in a 10–4 win over the Sydney Roosters.

=== 2019 ===
On 21 August, she was named captain of the Warriors and moved to the lock position. On 19 October, she started for New Zealand in their 17–15 2019 Rugby League World Cup 9s final win over Australia.

=== 2020 ===
On 20 February, Hale was named the Young New Zealander of the Year.

In September, Hale was one of five New Zealand-based Warriors' players to travel to Australia to play in the 2020 NRL Women's premiership. Due to COVID-19 restrictions, the players had to quarantine for 14 days on entering Australia and 14 days on return to New Zealand when the season was completed. On 27 October, Hale won the Veronica White Medal for her off-field work in her local community.

=== 2021 ===
In 2021, Hale relocated to Australia, joining the Tweed Heads Seagulls in the QRL Women's Premiership.

=== 2022 ===
In October she was selected for the New Zealand squad at the delayed 2021 Women's Rugby League World Cup in England.

=== 2023 ===
On 12 May 2023 she announced her intention to leave Leeds Rhinos to return to Australia and re-join Gold Coast Titans

She was appointed as the Captain of the Gold Coast Titans for the 2023 NRLW Season .

== Achievements and accolades ==
=== Individual ===
- RLPA New Zealand Women's Player of the Year: 2016
- Veronica White Medal: 2020
- Golden Boot Winner: 2023

=== Team ===
- 2019 Rugby League World Cup 9s: New Zealand – Winners
