= Yasmin Meakes =

Australia international rugby league and union footballer

Yasmin Clydsdale
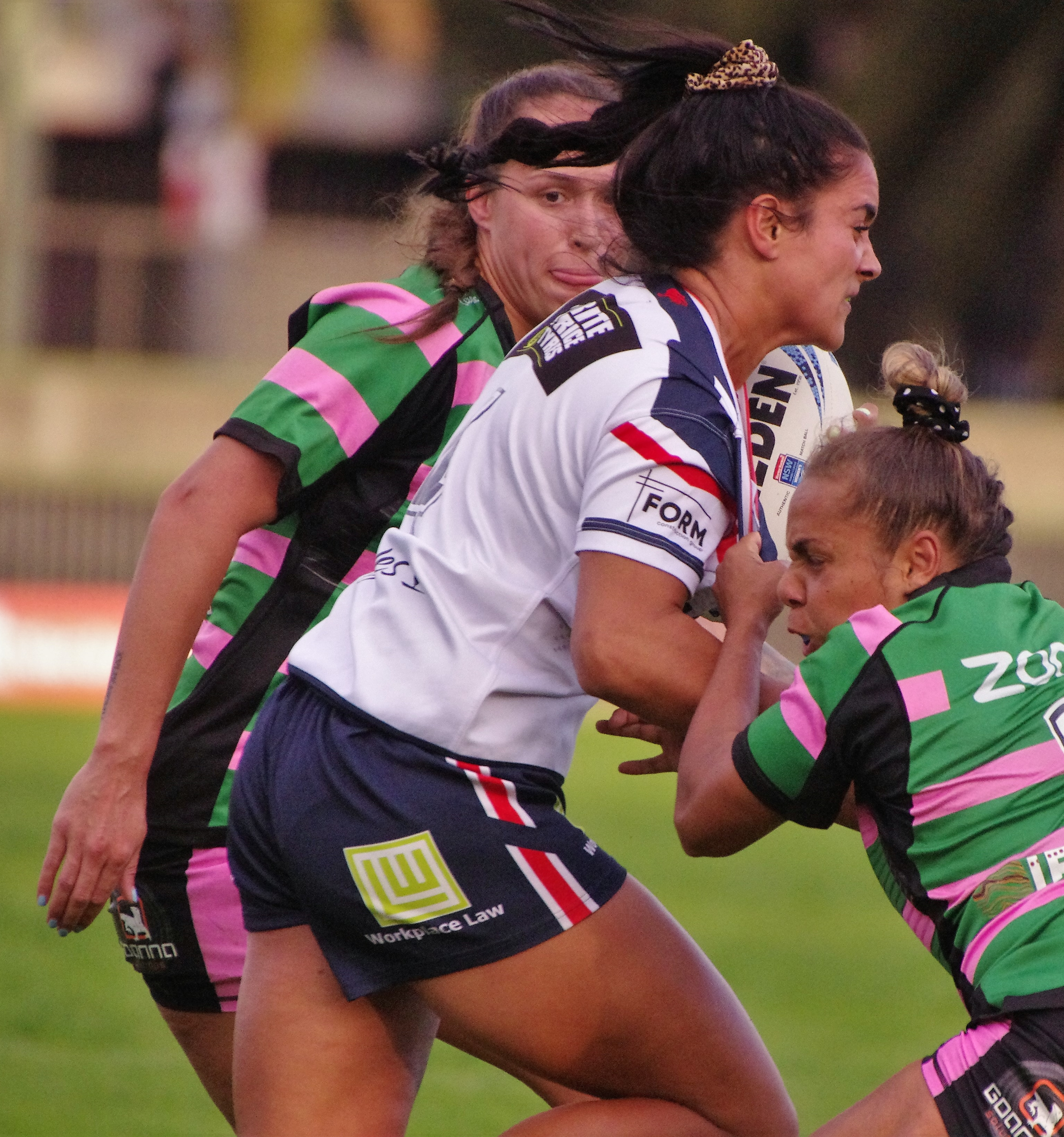
- Meakes (centre) running the ball

Personal information
- Born: Yasmin Meakes; 25 March 1994 (age 32) Newcastle, New South Wales, Australia
- Height: 172 cm (5 ft 8 in)
- Weight: 70 kg (11 st 0 lb)

Playing information

Rugby union
Representative
Years	Team	Pld	T	G	FG	P
2017–18	Australia 7s

Rugby league
- Position: Second-row, Wing
Club
Years	Team	Pld	T	G	FG	P
2020–21	Sydney Roosters	11	3	0	0	12
2022–	Newcastle Knights	44	12	0	0	48
	Total	55	15	0	0	60
Representative
Years	Team	Pld	T	G	FG	P
2022–26	New South Wales	14	1	0	0	4
2022–25	Australia	13	1	0	0	4
- Source: As of 1 November 2026
Medals
Women's rugby sevens
Representing Australia
2018 Women's Rugby 7's World Cup
Bronze medal – third place	2018 Rugby World Cup Sevens	Team competition

Yasmin Clydsdale (née Meakes); born 25 March 1994) is an Australian professional rugby league and rugby union footballer who captains the Newcastle Knights in the NRL Women's Premiership. Her positions are second-row and wing. She previously played for the Sydney Roosters in the NRLW and the Central Coast Roosters in the NSWRL Women's Premiership.

== Rugby union career ==
Meakes made her international rugby sevens debut in 2017. In July 2018, she was named in the squad for the 2018 Women's Rugby 7s World Cup in which Australia took home bronze.

== Rugby league career ==
Meakes made her NRLW debut for the Sydney Roosters in the 2020 NRLW season. She would later go on to play in the Roosters grand final losing team to the Brisbane Broncos where she scored a try.

On 13 November 2020, she made her State of Origin debut for New South Wales in their loss to Queensland.

She played in the Roosters' 2021 Grand Final win over the St. George Illawarra Dragons and scored a try.

In June 2022, she signed with the Newcastle Knights for the 2022 season. She made her club debut for the Knights in round 1 of the 2022 NRLW season against the Brisbane Broncos.

On 2 October 2022, Meakes played in the Knights' 2022 NRLW Grand Final win over the Parramatta Eels, scoring a try in the Knights' 32-12 victory.

In April 2023, she re-signed with the Knights on a contract until the end of 2025.
