= Destiny Mino-Sinapati =

Samoa international rugby league footballer

Personal information
- Born: 20 January 2005 (age 21) Brisbane, Queensland, Australia
- Height: 164 cm (5 ft 5 in)
- Weight: 67 kg (10 st 8 lb)

Playing information
- Position: Wing, Fullback
Club
Years	Team	Pld	T	G	FG	P
2023–26	Gold Coast Titans	13	3	0	0	12
2027–	Brisbane Broncos	0	0	0	0	0
	Total	13	3	0	0	12
Representative
Years	Team	Pld	T	G	FG	P
2023–	Samoa	7	3	0	0	12
2026	Queensland	1	0	0	0	0
- Source: As of 7 November 2026

Destiny Mino-Sinapati is an Australian-Samoan rugby league footballer who plays as a winger for the Gold Coast Titans in the NRLW competition and Samoa.

== Background ==
Born in Brisbane, Queensland. Mino-Sinapati is of Samoan descent. Sinapati began playing Basketball before making the switch to Rugby league in 2021.

== Playing career ==
=== 2023 ===
In 2023, Sinapati played for the Wynnum Manly Seagulls in the QRL Women's Premiership. On 13 July, she represented the Queensland Under 19 Women's team scoring a try in their 20–14 win.

On 22 July, Sinapati scored a try on her debut for Gold Coast Titans in round 1 against the North Queensland Cowboys. Sinapati scored the match sealing try in the semi-final against the Roosters. Sinapati played in 2023 NRL Women's Premiership Grand Final unfortunately losing to the Newcastle Knights 24–12.

On 15 October, Sinapati made her debut for Samoa in the 2023 Rugby League Pacific Championships against Fiji.

=== 2024 ===
In 2024, Sinapati played her second season for the Wynnum Manly Seagulls in the QRL Women's Premiership. She suffered an injury to her knee ruling her out for the rest of QRL Women's Premiership and the 2024 NRL Women's season.

=== 2025 ===
On 8 April, Sinapati re-signed with the Gold Coast Titans until 2026.

=== 2026 ===
She made her Queensland debut in Game 3 of the 2026 State of Origin on 28 May 2026 in the 4-12 defeat.
