= Sienna Lofipo =

Samoa international rugby league footballer

Personal information
- Born: 4 May 2005 (age 21) Brisbane, Queensland, Australia
- Height: 173 cm (5 ft 8 in)
- Weight: 78 kg (12 st 4 lb)

Playing information
- Position: Lock
Club
Years	Team	Pld	T	G	FG	P
2023–	Gold Coast Titans	24	4	0	0	16
Representative
Years	Team	Pld	T	G	FG	P
2023–25	Samoa	5	1	0	0	4
2024–26	Queensland	7	1	0	0	4
- Source: As of 25 June 2026

Sienna Lofipo is an Australian rugby league footballer who plays as a lock for the Gold Coast Titans in the NRLW competition.

== Background ==
Born in Brisbane, Queensland. Lofipo is of Samoan descent. Lofipo played her junior rugby league for Redlands RLC.

== Playing career ==
=== 2023 ===
In 2023, Lofipo captained the Under 19 Queensland Women's team to a 20–14 victory over the Sky Blues.

Lofipo made her debut in round 1 against the North Queensland Cowboys. Lofipo scored her first try in the 22–10 loss against Newcastle Knights. Lofipo played in 2023 NRL Women's Premiership Grand Final unfortunately losing to the Newcastle Knights 24–12.

On 15 October, Lofipo made her debut for Samoa in the 2023 Rugby League Pacific Championships against Fiji winning 26–12.

=== 2024 ===
In 2024, Lofipo made her debut for Queensland in Game 2, beating New South Wales 11–10. Lofipo sustained a PCL injury ruling her out for the last game of the series.

In round 5, Lofipo made her return against the Sydney Roosters, after missing the prior weeks due to a knee injury. In round 9, Lofipo scored a try in their 16-12 loss to the Canberra Raiders. Lofipo re-signed with the Gold Coast Titans until 2026.

Lofipo was selected to play for Samoa in the 2024 Rugby League Pacific Championships. On 19 October, Lofipo scored a try in their 30-16 win against Tonga.

=== 2025 ===
In game 1, Lofipo scored her first try for Queensland in their 32-12 loss to New South Wales.
