= Jessika Elliston =

Australia international rugby player (born 1997)

Personal information
- Born: 17 October 1997 (age 28) Brisbane, Queensland, Australia
- Height: 176 cm (5 ft 9 in)
- Weight: 86 kg (13 st 8 lb)

Playing information
- Position: Prop, Second-row
Club
| Years | Team | Pld | T | G | FG | P |
|---|---|---|---|---|---|---|
| 2019–20 | Brisbane Broncos | 5 | 0 | 0 | 0 | 0 |
| 2021– | Gold Coast Titans | 43 | 6 | 0 | 0 | 24 |
| | Total | 48 | 6 | 0 | 0 | 24 |
Representative
| Years | Team | Pld | T | G | FG | P |
| 2019–26 | Queensland | 13 | 0 | 0 | 0 | 0 |
| 2022 | Prime Minister's XIII | 1 | 0 | 0 | 0 | 0 |
| 2023–25 | Australia | 5 | 0 | 0 | 0 | 0 |
- Source: RLP As of 28 May 2026

Jessika Elliston (born 17 October 1997) is an Australian rugby league footballer who plays for the Gold Coast Titans in the NRL Women's Premiership and the Tweed Heads Seagulls in the QRL Women's Premiership.

Primarily a second-rower, she is a Queensland representative.

== Background ==
Elliston was born in Brisbane and grew up on the Gold Coast where she attended Palm Beach Currumbin State High School.

== Playing career ==
Before switching to rugby league, Elliston played for the Queensland Reds sevens team in 2016 and captained Bond University at the Aon Uni 7s competition in 2017.

=== 2019 ===
In 2019, joined the Tweed Heads Seagulls. In May, she represented South East Queensland at the Women's National Championships.

On 21 June, Elliston made her debut for Queensland, coming off the bench in a 4–14 loss to New South Wales. On 28 June, Elliston joined the Brisbane Broncos NRL Women's Premiership team.

In Round 1 of the 2019 NRL Women's season, she made her debut for the Broncos in their 14–4 win over the St George Illawarra Dragons.

=== 2020 ===
On 25 October, Elliston came off the bench in the Broncos' 20–10 NRLW Grand Final win over the Sydney Roosters. On 26 October, she was named in Queensland's State of Origin squad but did not play in their 24–18 win over New South Wales.

== Achievements and accolades ==
=== Team ===
- 2020 NRLW Grand Final: Brisbane Broncos – Winners
