= Evania Pelite =

Australian rugby league and rugby union footballer

Personal information
- Full name: Evania Faaea Pelite
- Born: 12 July 1995 (age 31) Caboolture, Queensland, Australia
- Height: 1.69 m (5 ft 7 in)
- Weight: 80 kg (176 lb; 12 st 8 lb)

Playing information
- Position: Fullback
Club
Years	Team	Pld	T	G	FG	P
2020	New Zealand Warriors	3	3	0	0	12
2021–	Gold Coast Titans	30	10	0	0	40
	Total	33	13	0	0	52
Representative
Years	Team	Pld	T	G	FG	P
2022	Australia	4	7	0	0	28
2022–24	Queensland	6	2	0	0	8
2024	Samoa	2	0	0	0	0
- Source: As of 5 November 2024
Medals
Women's rugby sevens
Representing Australia
Olympic Games
Gold medal – first place	2016 Rio de Janeiro	Team competition
Commonwealth Games
Silver medal – second place	2018 Gold Coast	Team competition

Evania Faaea "Vani" Pelite OAM (born 12 July 1995) is an Australian rugby union and rugby league player. She won a gold medal at the 2016 Summer Olympics in Rio.

== Rugby Union ==
Pelite made her debut for the Australian women's national rugby sevens team at the age of 17 at the 2013 Amsterdam Women's Sevens. She also represented Australia in touch rugby.

Pelite was selected to represent Australia in rugby sevens at the 2016 Summer Olympics. She was a member of Australia's team at the 2016 Olympics, defeating New Zealand in the final to win the inaugural Olympic gold medal in the sport.

She also won a silver medal at the 2018 Commonwealth Games.

Pelite was named in the Australia squad for the Rugby sevens at the 2020 Summer Olympics. The team came second in the pool round but then lost to Fiji 14-12 in the quarterfinals. Full details.

== Rugby League ==
Pelite resigned with Gold Coast Titans until 2027. Pelite represented Samoa in the 2024 Rugby League Pacific Championships.

== Honours and achievements ==
=== Rugby League ===
- Titans Player of the Year: 2024
- Warriors' Player of the Year: 2020
- Titans Player's Player: 2024
- Titans Members’ MVP: 2022, 2023, 2024

=== Rugby Union ===
- 2019, Dubai Sevens performance tracker player of the round
