= Shannon Mato =

Australia international rugby union & NZ international rugby league player (born 1998)

Personal information
- Born: Shannon Mato; 21 August 1998 (age 28) Whangārei, New Zealand
- Height: 179 cm (5 ft 10 in)
- Weight: 86 kg (13 st 8 lb)

Playing information

Rugby union
- Position: Lock
Club
| Years | Team | Pld | T | G | FG | P |
|---|---|---|---|---|---|---|
| 2018–20 | Queensland Reds | 15 | 3 | 0 | 0 | 15 |
Representative
| Years | Team | Pld | T | G | FG | P |
| 2019 | Australia |

Rugby league
- Position: Prop
Club
| Years | Team | Pld | T | G | FG | P |
|---|---|---|---|---|---|---|
| 2020 | Brisbane Broncos | 4 | 0 | 0 | 0 | 0 |
| 2021–25 | Gold Coast Titans | 27 | 3 | 0 | 0 | 12 |
| 2026– | Brisbane Broncos | 4 | 0 | 0 | 0 | 0 |
| | Total | 35 | 3 | 0 | 0 | 12 |
Representative
| Years | Team | Pld | T | G | FG | P |
| 2020–26 | Queensland | 7 | 0 | 0 | 0 | 0 |
| 2021 | Māori All Stars | 1 | 0 | 0 | 0 | 0 |
| 2026 | New Zealand | 4 | 1 | 0 | 0 | 4 |
- Source: RLP As of 15 November 2026

Shannon Mato (born 21 August 1998) is a New Zealand-born Australian rugby league footballer who plays as a prop for the Brisbane Broncos Women in the NRL Women's Premiership. She previously played for the Gold Coast Titans Women where she won player of the year awards in 2022 and 2023. Mato is a Queensland and Australian Jillaroos representative.

She previously played rugby union for the Queensland Reds and represented Australia.

== Background ==
Mato was born in Whangārei, New Zealand, where she played rugby league, before moving to Australia in 2011.

== Playing career ==
=== Rugby union ===
In 2017, Mato represented Griffith University at the AON Uni 7s series. In 2018, she began playing for the Queensland Reds in the Super W competition. In 2019, Mato her international debut for Australia against Japan.

=== Rugby league ===
In 2020, Mato joined the Wests Panthers in the Holcim Cup. On 27 September 2020, she joined the Brisbane Broncos Women in the NRL Women's Premiership. In Round 1 of the 2020 NRLW season, she made her debut for the Broncos in a 28–14 win over the New Zealand Warriors#Women's team. On 25 October 2020, she started at prop in the Broncos' Grand Final win over the Sydney Roosters.

On 13 November 2020, she made her debut for Queensland in the Women's State of Origin win over New South Wales. On 20 February 2021, she represented the Māori All Stars in their 24–0 win over the Indigenous All Stars.

She made her New Zealand international début in the 2026 Rugby League World Cup 18-12 win over Fiji on 18 October 2026.

== Achievements and accolades ==
=== Team ===
- 2020 NRLW Grand Final: Brisbane Broncos – Winners
