= Jaime Chapman =

Australia international rugby league player (born 2002)

Personal information
- Born: 17 March 2002 (age 24) Sutherland, New South Wales, Australia
- Height: 176 cm (5 ft 9 in)
- Weight: 74 kg (11 st 9 lb)

Playing information
- Position: Centre, Wing, Fullback
Club
Years	Team	Pld	T	G	FG	P
2020–21	St George Illawarra Dragons	9	3	0	0	12
2022	Brisbane Broncos	5	4	0	0	16
2023–	Gold Coast Titans	33	23	0	0	92
	Total	47	30	0	0	120
Representative
Years	Team	Pld	T	G	FG	P
2021–25	Indigenous All Stars	5	5	0	0	20
2022–24	Prime Minister's XIII	2	2	0	0	8
2022–26	Australia	10	18	0	0	72
2023–26	New South Wales	11	5	0	0	20
- Source: As of 16 November 2026

Jaime Chapman (born 17 March 2002) is an Australian rugby league footballer who plays as a centre for the Gold Coast Titans in the NRL Women's Premiership and the Tweed Heads Seagulls in the QRL Women's Premiership.

== Background and life ==
Born in Sutherland, New South Wales, Chapman played her junior rugby league for the Kurnell Stingrays. She is of Indigenous Australian descent (Kamilaroi) through her grandmother.

In March 2026, Chapman featured in the reality TV sports show Rivals: Sport vs. Sport. She, alongside Josh Addo-Carr, Ali Brigginshaw, and Reece Walsh represented "Team Rugby League".

== Playing career ==
In 2019, Chapman joined the Cronulla-Sutherland Sharks Tarsha Gale Cup side. On 21 June 2019, she started at centre for New South Wales under-18 in the inaugural women's under-18 State of Origin game against Queensland.

On 20 September 2019, she joined the St. George Illawarra Dragons NRL Women's Premiership squad as a development player.

=== 2020 ===
In 2020, Chapman began the season began playing for the Sharks' Tarsha Gale Cup side, before moving up to their NSWRL Women's Premiership squad.

On 24 September, Chapman moved into the Dragons' full-time NRLW squad. In Round 1 of the 2020 NRL Women's season, she made her debut for the Dragons, starting on the wing in a 4–18 loss to the Sydney Roosters.

=== 2021 ===
In 2021, Chapman joined the Tweed Heads Seagulls in the QRL Women's Premiership. On 20 February, she started at fullback for the Indigenous All Stars in their 24–0 loss to the Māori All Stars.

=== 2022 ===
On 12 February, Chapman played on the left wing for the Indigenous All Stars, scoring two tries in their 18–8 win over the Māori All Stars. She was awarded the Trish Hina Medal as player of the match.

=== 2023 ===
On 22 July, Jamie debuted at centre for the Gold Coast Titans, she ran for 123 metres in 9 runs, making 1 line break and 6 tackle breaks

Chapman played in six of seven matches for the St. George Illawarra Dragons in the postponed 2021 NRL Women's season, including the Grand Final on 10 April 2022. Chapman was named in the peer-selected NRL Dream team for the postponed 2021 season.

In early June, the Brisbane Broncos announced that Chapman had signed to play for the club in the 2022 NRL Women's season.

In late September, Chapman was named in the Dream Team announced by the Rugby League Players Association. The team was selected by the players, who each cast one vote for each position.

== Achievements and accolades ==
=== Representative ===
- Rugby League World Cup Champion: 2026
