= 2025 NRL Women's season squads =

Australian rugby league players

The 2025 NRL Women's Premiership comprised 12 competing teams. Starting squad size was 24 players on contract with a further 4 players on development contracts. Squad size could grow above these initial limits subject to the approval of the administrative body, the National Rugby League, to cover contracted players who sustained season-ending injuries.

Approval for replacements into the squad could be sought for injured players who were on multi-year contracts, including for injuries carried over from the 2024 NRLW season or 2024 Pacific Championships. Similarly, a club could seek approval to replace a player injured in pre-season training or a trial match.

The 12 clubs in total used 299 players. Each club used between 21 and 28 players. The number of players making their NRLW debut in the 2025 season was 82. By club this ranged from two (North Queensland Cowboys and Sydney Roosters) to seventeen (New Zealand Warriors) debutants.

During the season, 530 tries were scored by 181 individual players. So, 60.54% of players scored at least one try. A tally of 344 goals were kicked by 20 players, with six of the twelve teams having a single successful goalkicker. Four field-goals were kicked during the season, the first by Zahara Temara for Canberra Raiders in golden point to win their Round 9 match against Wests Tigers, 17–16. The second came the next day, kicked by Chantay Kiria-Ratu for Cronulla-Sutherland Sharks in golden point to win their Round 9 match against Newcastle Knights, 19–18. The third was kicked by Lauren Brown for Gold Coast Titans in golden point to win their Round 11 match against Canberra Raiders, 17–16. The fourth and last field-goal of the season was kicked by Jocelyn Kelleher for Sydney Roosters in their preliminary final, 17–16 win over Cronulla-Sutherland Sharks.

Statistics are drawn from match centres on the NRL website.

== Key ==
- Age is at 14 September 2025, the last day of the regular season (Round 11).
- Position(s) are those played during the season. Players who made appearances only off the interchange bench are listed with the position or positions played when they took the field.
- In the NRLW Career columns:
  - S is the number of NRLW seasons played.
  - M is the number of NRLW matches played at the end of the 2025 season.
- in the 2025 Reps columns:
  - The Int'l column includes matches in the Pacific Championships and other internationals.
    - The number to the right of the flag indicates the number of matches played.
    - A zero (0) indicates the player was included in an international squad but did not play in a match during 2025.
  - The Origin series consisted on 3 matches played on May 1, 15 and 29, 2025.
    - New South Wales
    - Queensland
    - The number to the right of the icon indicates the number of matches played. A zero (0) indicates the player was included in an Origin squad but did not play in the 2024 series.
  - Other includes the All Stars match, the Prime Minister's XIII match and the Under 19 State of Origin match
    - 1 indicates an appearance for the Indigenous All Stars.
    - 1 indicates an appearance for the Māori All Stars.
    - 1 indicates an appearance for the Australian Prime Minister's XIII Women's team.
    - 1 indicates an appearance for the Papua New Guinea Prime Minister's XIII Women's team.
    - U indicates an appearance for the New South Wales Under 19 State of Origin team.
    - U indicates an appearance for the Queensland Under 19 State of Origin team.

== Brisbane Broncos ==
The Brisbane Broncos were coached by Scott Prince. Ali Brigginshaw and Tamika Upton were appointed joint captains. Both appeared in all thirteen matches played by the Broncos.

Jersey numbers in the table reflect the Broncos' Grand Final team list.

J#	Player	Age	Position(s)	NRLW Career			Past Seasons 2018-24	2025 NRLW					2025 Reps
J#	Player	Age	Position(s)	Debut	S	M	Past Seasons 2018-24	M	T	G	F	Pts	Int'l	Origin	Other
1	Tamika Upton	28	Fullback	2019	7	50	11 26	13	20	0	0	80	3	2	—
2	Kerri Johnson	22	Wing	2025	1	13	—	13	10	0	0	40	—	—	—
3	Mele Hufanga	30	Centre	2023	3	33	20	13	8	0	0	32	3	—	—
4	Julia Robinson	27	Centre	2018	8	46	34	12	9	0	0	36	4	3	—
5	Hayley Maddick	33	Wing	2021	5	42	29	13	8	0	0	32	—	1	—
6	Gayle Broughton	29	Five-eighth	2022	4	36	7 16	13	2	0	0	8	—	—	—
7	Ali Brigginshaw	35	Halfback	2018	8	56	43	13	0	0	0	0	4	3	—
8	Annetta Nu'uausala	30	Prop	2018	7	35	4 5 15	11	2	0	0	8	2	—	—
14	Destiny Brill	22	Hooker	2021	5	41	6 6 18	11	3	0	0	12	2	3	—
10	Brianna Clark	30	Prop	2020	6	37	2 4 20	11	1	6	0	16	1	—	—
11	Lauren Dam	28	Second-row	2021	4	30	2 17	11	4	0	0	16	—	—	—
12	Romy Teitzel	26	Second-row	2020	6	45	20 12	13	4	50	0	116	—	3	—
13	Keilee Joseph	23	Lock, Prop	2021	5	45	22 10	13	1	0	0	4	4	2	1
9	Jada Ferguson	23	Hooker	2021	5	39	26	13	4	0	0	16	—	2	—
15	Chelsea Lenarduzzi	29	Prop	2018	8	55	42	13	4	0	0	16	—	1	—
16	Shenae Ciesiolka	28	Centre, Wing	2020	6	40	32	8	0	0	0	0	—	3	—
17	Shalom Sauaso	18	Lock	2025	1	10	—	10	5	0	0	20	2	—	U
18	Reegan Hicks	19	Second-row	2025	1	4	—	4	0	0	0	0	—	—	U
19	Azalleyah Maaka	25	Hooker	2025	1	2	—	2	0	0	0	0	—	—	—
20	Bree Spreadborough	26	Lock	2024	2	7	2	5	1	0	0	4	—	—	—
21	Tafito Lafaele	24	Prop	2021	3	14	13	1	0	0	0	0	—	—	—
22	Skyla Adams	20	Five-eighth	2024	2	3	2	1	0	0	0	0	—	—	—
–	Lavinia Gould	42	Hooker, Lock	2018	7	30	30	0	0	0	0	0	—	—	—
–	Montaya Hudson	19	Fullback	—	0	0	—	0	0	0	0	0	—	—	—
–	Tara McGrath-West	24	Second-row	2022	3	16	13	3	0	0	0	0	—	—	—
DV	Amanii Misa	—	Prop, Second-row	—	0	0	—	0	0	0	0	0	—	—	U
DV	Georgia Bartlett	—	Fullback	—	0	0	—	0	0	0	0	0	—	—	—
–	Shaylee Joseph	19	Second-row	—	0	0	—	0	0	0	0	0	—	—	—

Notes:

- The following players were on a Development contract in 2025:
  - Georgia Bartlett (Queensland Country in 2024)
  - Amanii Misa (Queensland City in 2024)

The Brisbane Broncos announced player signings in several instalments from December 2024.

== Canberra Raiders ==
The Canberra Raiders were coached by Darrin Borthwick. Simaima Taufa and Zahara Temara were appointed joint captains. Taufa made eleven and Temara made ten appearances of the eleven matches played by the Raiders.

Jersey numbers in the table reflect the team list announced for the Raiders' Round 11 team list.

J#	Player	Age	Position(s)	NRLW Career			Past Seasons 2018-24	2025 NRLW					2025 Reps
J#	Player	Age	Position(s)	Debut	S	M	Past Seasons 2018-24	M	T	G	F	Pts	Int'l	Origin	Other
1	Elise Simpson	18	Fullback	2025	1	9	—	9	6	0	0	24	—	—	—
19	Relna Wuruki-Hosea	19	Wing	2024	2	6	3	3	2	0	0	8	1	—	1
3	Leianne Tufuga	23	Centre	2021	5	39	12 16	11	1	0	0	4	1	—	—
4	Cheyelle Robins-Reti	28	Centre, Fullback	2023	3	28	18	10	1	0	0	4	—	—	—
5	Isabella Waterman	25	Wing	2024	2	8	1	7	3	0	0	12	2	—	—
6	Sereana Naitokatoka	24	Five-eighth, Halfback	2021	4	28	4 9 6	9	1	0	0	4	2	—	—
7	Zahara Temara	28	Halfback	2018	8	52	24 18	10	2	21	1	51	—	—	—
8	Chloe Saunders	26	Prop	2023	3	29	18	11	2	0	0	8	—	—	—
9	Chanté Temara	24	Hooker	2020	5	32	2 1 18	11	0	0	0	0	—	—	1
10	Sophie Holyman	27	Prop	2022	4	34	5 18	11	1	0	0	4	—	3	1
11	Jordyn Preston	22	Second-row	2024	2	13	2	11	4	0	0	16	—	—	—
12	Tatiana Finau	21	Second-row	2024	2	9	1	8	0	0	0	0	2	—	—
13	Simaima Taufa	31	Lock	2018	8	49	9 12 17	11	2	0	0	8	1	3	—
14	Emma Barnes	21	Hooker	2023	3	24	14	10	0	0	0	0	—	—	—
18	Lili Boyle	20	Lock	2025	1	7	—	7	0	0	0	0	—	—	—
16	Amelia Pasikala	21	Second-row	2023	3	15	7 4	4	1	0	0	4	—	—	—
17	Hollie-Mae Dodd	22	Second-row	2023	3	21	15	6	2	0	0	8	1	—	—
21	Madyson Tooth	23	Centre	—	0	0	—	0	0	0	0	0	—	—	—
2	Mackenzie Wiki	23	Wing, Centre	2023	3	23	14	9	3	0	0	12	—	—	—
15	Grace Kemp	24	Prop	2023	3	26	18	8	0	0	0	0	—	—	1
20	Georgia Thomas	27	Five-eighth	2025	1	3	—	3	0	0	0	0	—	—	—
22	Kerehitina Matua	26	Second-row, Prop	2023	3	20	16	4	0	0	0	0	2	—	1
–	Marley Cardwell	20	Prop	2025	1	2	—	2	0	0	0	0	—	—	—
–	Jaida Faleono	19	Prop	2024	1	3	3	0	0	0	0	0	—	—	—
DV	Uta Uatisone Poka	18	Second-row	—	0	0	—	0	0	0	0	0	—	—	—
IS	Madison Bartlett	30	Wing	2019	7	40	5 6 5 18	6	4	0	0	16	—	—	—
IS	Claudia Finau	19	Prop	—	0	0	—	0	0	0	0	0	—	—	—
IS	Ua Ravu	28	Lock	2023	1	2	2	0	0	0	0	0	—	—	—
IS	Monalisa Soliola	21	Second-row	2022	4	25	5 15	5	0	0	0	0	—	—	—

Notes:

- The following players were signed on a Development contract for 2025.
  - Lili Boyle
  - Milly Caldwell
  - Madyson Tooth
  - Uta Utaisone Poka
- Claudia Finau missed the 2025 season due to an ACL injury.
- Shakiah Tungai decided to sit out the 2025 NRLW season. Isabella Waterman was brought into the squad to replace Tungai.
- In mid-July 2025, the Raiders announced that Ua Ravu would miss the 2025 season due to an ACL injury.
- Lili Boyle was elevated into the squad to replace Ravu.

The Canberra Raiders announced player signings in several instalments from December 2024.

== Canterbury-Bankstown Bulldogs ==
In their inaugural NRLW season, the Canterbury-Bankstown Bulldogs coach was Brayden Wiliame. Tayla Preston and Angelina Teakaraanga-Katoa were appointed joint captains. Preston made eleven and Teakaraanga-Katoa made ten appearances of the eleven matches played by the Bulldogs.

Jersey numbers in the table reflect the Bulldogs' Round 11 team list.

J#	Player	Age	Position(s)	NRLW Career			Past Seasons 2018-24	2025 NRLW					2025 Reps
J#	Player	Age	Position(s)	Debut	S	M	Past Seasons 2018-24	M	T	G	F	Pts	Int'l	Origin	Other
1	Andie Robinson	23	Fullback	2022	3	22	5 6	11	3	0	0	12	—	—	1
2	Elizabeth MacGregor	18	Wing	2025	1	8	—	8	7	0	0	28	—	—	—
3	Monica Tagoai	26	Centre	2025	1	8	—	8	3	0	0	12	—	—	—
4	Moana Courtenay	25	Centre	2025	1	10	—	10	3	0	0	12	2	—	—
5	Simina Lokotui	19	Wing, Centre	2025	1	7	—	7	1	0	0	4	2	—	—
6	Ashleigh Quinlan	30	Five-eighth	2022	4	33	6 17	10	3	0	0	12	3	—	1
7	Tayla Preston	25	Halfback	2022	4	37	6 20	11	1	21	0	46	—	—	—
8	Holli Wheeler	35	Lock, Prop	2018	7	46	20 17	9	0	0	0	0	—	—	—
9	Anneka Wilson	22	Hooker, Five-eighth	2025	1	9	—	9	0	0	0	0	—	—	—
10	Alexis Tauaneai	20	Prop, Second-row	2023	3	24	16	8	3	0	0	12	3	—	—
11	Shannon Muru	27	Second-row	2023	2	14	4	10	1	0	0	4	2	—	—
12	Shaniece Monschau	23	Second-row	2025	1	11	—	11	0	0	0	0	2	—	—
13	Angelina Teakaraanga-Katoa	23	Lock, Prop	2022	4	29	1 18	10	2	0	0	8	3	—	—
14	Ebony Prior	23	Hooker	2023	3	24	13	11	1	0	0	4	—	—	—
15	Pauline Suli-Ruka	19	Centre	2025	1	5	—	5	0	0	0	0	2	—	1
16	Ma’atuleio Fotu-Moala	26	Prop	2024	2	10	6	4	0	0	0	0	—	—	—
19	Hope Millard	20	Prop	2025	1	6	—	6	0	0	0	0	—	—	—
18	Shaquaylah Mahakitau-Monschau	19	Hooker	2025	1	3	—	3	0	0	0	0	—	—	—
17	Kalosipani Hopoate	21	Prop	2022	4	34	24	10	1	0	0	4	2	—	—
20	Latisha Smythe	21	Second-row	2025	1	7	—	7	0	0	0	0	2	—	—
21	Paea Uilou	19	Lock	2025	1	4	—	4	0	0	0	0	1	—	—
22	Bridget Hoy	26	Wing	2024	2	5	1	4	0	0	0	0	—	—	—
–	Adi Vani Buleki	24	Wing	2025	1	6	—	6	1	0	0	4	—	—	—
–	Sarahcen Oliver	25	Centre	—	0	0	—	0	0	0	0	0	—	—	—
DV	Waimarie Martin	20	Hooker	—	0	0	—	0	0	0	0	0	—	—	—
DV	Lahnayah Daniel	18	Lock	—	0	0	—	0	0	0	0	0	—	—	—
DV	Leilani Wilson	22	Second-row	—	0	0	—	0	0	0	0	0	—	—	—
IS	Tegan Dymock	23	Prop	2021	5	30	6 19	5	0	0	0	0	—	—	—

Notes

- The following players were signed on a Development contract for 2025:
  - Waimarie Martin (Canterbury Bulldogs, U19 and Opens in 2024)
  - Leilani Wilson (Wentworthville Magpies, Opens in 2024)
  - Lahnayah Daniel Mahakitau-Monschau (Canterbury Bulldogs, U17 in 2024, U19 in 2025)
  - Simina Lokotui (Canterbury Bulldogs, U19 in 2025)

The Canterbury-Bankstown Bulldogs announced player signings in several instalments from July 2024.

== Cronulla-Sutherland Sharks ==
The Cronulla-Sutherland Sharks were coached by Tony Herman.

Jersey numbers in the table reflect the Sharks' Preliminary Final team list.

J#	Player	Age	Position(s)	NRLW Career			Past Seasons 2018-24	2025 NRLW					2025 Reps
J#	Player	Age	Position(s)	Debut	S	M	Past Seasons 2018-24	M	T	G	F	Pts	Int'l	Origin	Other
1	Jada Taylor	22	Fullback	2022	4	15	1 8	6	2	0	0	8	—	—	—
2	Cassie Staples	32	Wing	2022	4	30	1 16	13	8	0	0	32	2	—	—
3	Tiana Penitani Gray	29	Centre	2019	7	48	6 10 20	12	0	0	0	0	4	3	—
22	Annessa Biddle	22	Centre, Second-row	2023	3	26	19	7	0	0	0	0	3	—	1
5	Georgia Ravics	29	Wing	2023	3	28	16	12	10	0	0	40	—	—	—
6	Emma Verran	30	Fullback, Five-eighth	2021	5	43	13 18	12	9	0	0	36	—	3	—
7	Chantay Kiria-Ratu	20	Halfback	2023	2	24	11	13	1	11	1	27	2	—	—
8	Ellie Johnston	24	Prop	2020	6	48	3 12 20	13	3	0	0	12	3	3	—
23	Quincy Dodd	25	Hooker	2019	7	45	5 13 20	7	2	0	0	8	4	—	1 1
10	Manilita Takapautolo	19	Prop	2024	2	20	7	13	1	0	0	4	—	—	—
11	Talei Holmes	25	Second-row, Lock	2020	6	42	10 19	13	0	0	0	0	—	—	—
12	Jaydika Tafua	19	Second-row	2025	1	9	—	9	0	0	0	0	1	—	—
13	Brooke Anderson	29	Lock, Hooker	2022	4	37	5 20	12	2	0	0	8	3	—	—
9	Georgia Hannaway	24	Five-eighth, Hooker	2024	2	20	7	13	2	17	0	42	—	1	1
15	Stephanie Faulkner	19	Prop	2025	1	11	—	11	3	0	0	12	—	—	—
16	Rhiannon Byers	26	Second-row	2023	3	18	11	7	2	0	0	8	—	—	—
17	Anne-Marie Kiria-Ratu	19	Second-row	2025	1	9	—	9	1	0	0	4	2	—	—
14	Tyla King	31	Fullback, Five-eighth	2023	3	21	13	8	0	0	0	0	1	—	1
4	Grace-Lee Weekes	21	Centre	2025	1	8	—	8	1	0	0	4	—	—	—
18	Nakia Davis-Welsh	29	Hooker	2023	3	14	2 4	8	1	0	0	4	—	—	1
19	Jacinta Carter	21	Prop	2023	3	11	3	8	0	0	0	0	—	—	—
20	Dominique du Toit	28	Wing	2024	2	3	1	2	1	0	0	4	—	—	—
–	Monique Donovan	—	Wing, Centre	2023	2	15	15	0	0	0	0	0	—	—	1
–	Tommaya Kelly-Sines	30	Prop	2021	3	16	4 12	0	0	0	0	0	—	—	1
–	Leki Leilua	18	Prop	2025	1	1	—	1	0	0	0	0	—	—	—
DV	Tia-Jordyn Vasilovski	20	Fullback	—	0	0	—	0	0	0	0	0	—	—	—
IJ	Caitlan Johnston-Green	24	Prop	2019	6	26	3 20	3	0	0	0	0	—	—	—
DV	Olivia Herman	19	Halfback	—	0	0	—	0	0	0	0	0	—	—	—
DV	Nanise Vakacavu	21	Prop	—	0	0	—	0	0	0	0	0	—	—	—
IS	Filomina Hanisi	24	Prop	2020	6	25	4 12 4 4	1	1	0	0	4	—	—	—

- Chantay Kiria-Ratu kicked a field goal 46 seconds into golden point extra time to win the Sharks' Round 9 match against the Newcastle Knights on 31 August 2025.
- The following players were signed on a Development contract for 2025:
  - Stephanie Faulkner
  - Olivia Herman
  - Nanise Vacakavu
  - Tia-Jordyn Vasilovski
- Emma Verran played under her maiden name, Emma Tonegato up to the conclusion of the 2024 season.
- Filomina Hanisi sustained a ruptured ACL injury in Round 1, ruling her out for the remainder of the 2025 season.
- Vanessa Foliaki singned a contract extension in January 2025 but announced her retirement in early July, on the eve of Round 1. Foliaki was subsequently appointed assistant coach to Tonga.

The Cronulla Sutherland Sharks announced player signings in several instalments from May 2024.

== Gold Coast Titans ==
The Gold Coast Titans are coached by Karyn Murphy.

Jersey numbers in the table reflect the Titans' Elimination Final team list.

J#	Player	Age	Position(s)	NRLW Career			Past Seasons 2018-24	2025 NRLW					2025 Reps
J#	Player	Age	Position(s)	Debut	S	M	Past Seasons 2018-24	M	T	G	F	Pts	Int'l	Origin	Other
1	Lailani Montgomery	20	Fullback	2024	2	15	5	10	0	0	0	0	—	—	1
3	Georgia Grey	20	Wing, Centre	2024	2	19	8	11	8	0	0	32	—	—	—
22	Sarina Masaga	20	Centre	2024	2	11	3	8	1	0	0	4	2	—	—
4	Ivana Lolesio	21	Centre	2025	1	12	—	12	1	0	0	4	—	—	—
5	Destiny Mino-Sinapati	20	Wing	2023	2	13	10	3	0	0	0	0	2	—	—
6	Taliah Fuimaono	26	Five-eighth, Hooker	2021	5	29	13 8	8	2	0	0	8	2	—	1
7	Lauren Brown	30	Halfback	2020	6	45	10 23	12	1	21	1	47	0	3	—
8	Sienna Lofipo	20	Lock, Prop	2023	3	24	14	10	1	0	0	4	1	3	—
14	Brittany Breayley-Nati	34	Hooker	2018	7	42	4 4 31	3	0	0	0	0	—	—	—
10	Jessika Elliston	27	Prop	2019	7	48	5 31	12	1	0	0	4	3	3	—
11	Jasmine Solia	28	Second-row, Wing	2022	4	25	14	11	3	0	0	12	—	—	—
12	Shaylee Bent	25	Second-row	2019	7	51	19 20	12	1	0	0	4	—	0	1
13	Georgia Hale	30	Lock, Hooker	2018	8	50	9 30	11	0	0	0	0	3	—	—
9	Lily-Rose Kolc	20	Hooker	2024	2	18	7	11	2	0	0	8	—	—	—
15	Laikha Clarke	23	Prop	2021	5	29	19	10	1	0	0	4	2	—	1
16	Natasha Penitani	25	Prop	2024	2	21	9	12	1	0	0	4	2	—	—
2	Phoenix-Raine Hippi	19	Wing, Centre	2025	1	7	—	7	9	0	0	36	—	—	U 1
17	Takoda Thompson	19	Prop, Second-row	2025	1	10	—	10	0	0	0	0	—	—	U
19	Megan Pakulis	28	Lock	2025	1	4	—	4	0	0	0	0	2	—	—
18	Estanoa Faitala-Mariner	20	Centre	2025	1	5	—	5	1	0	0	4	—	—	—
20	Dannii Perese	21	Prop	2023	3	13	12	1	0	0	0	0	—	—	—
21	Ngatokotoru Arakua	28	Prop	2018	5	15	4 4 2 3	2	0	0	0	0	2	—	—
–	Jasmin Morrissey	—	Wing	2025	1	1	—	1	0	0	0	0	—	—	—
–	Kelsey Parkin	27	Hooker	2025	1	1	—	1	0	0	0	0	—	—	—
–	Kayla Jackson	22	Wing	2025	1	2	—	2	0	0	0	0	—	—	—
–	Jayda Lofipo	23	Prop	—	0	0	—	0	0	0	0	0	—	—	—
–	Shaianne McGlone	31	Centre, Second-row	2024	1	6	6	0	0	0	0	0	—	—	—
IJ	Jaime Chapman	23	Wing	2020	6	36	9 5 17	5	2	0	0	8	—	3	1 1
IJ	Niall Williams-Guthrie	37	Centre	2023	2	17	17	0	0	0	0	0	—	—	—
IJ	Pauline Piliae-Rasabale	33	Five-eighth	2023	3	24	18	6	1	0	0	4	1	—	—
DV	Savannah Roberts-Hickling	19	Centre	—	0	0	—	0	0	0	0	0	—	—	—
DV	Eta Sikahele	18	Second-row	—	0	0	—	0	0	0	0	0	—	—	—
P	Shannon Mato	27	Prop	2020	5	31	4 27	0	0	0	0	0	1	—	1
P	Evania Pelite	30	Fullback, Centre	2020	5	33	3 30	0	0	0	0	0	—	—	—
IS	Lily Patston	—	Wing, Fullback	2025	1	4	—	4	1	0	0	4	—	—	—
IS	Rilee Jorgensen	18	Second-row, Prop	2023	2	12	12	0	0	0	0	0	—	—	—

Notes:

- The following players were signed on a Development contract for 2025:
  - Estanoa Faitala-Mariner (Returning from injury)
  - Phoenix-Raine Hippi
  - Savannah Roberts-Hickling
  - Eta-Fusi Sikahele
- Evania Isa'ako (née Pelite) missed the 2025 season due to pregnancy.
- Shannon Mato missed the 2025 season due to pregnancy.

The Gold Coast Titans announced player signings in several instalments from October 2024.

The Titans also confirmed a set of departures in late February 2025.

== Newcastle Knights ==
The Newcastle Knights were coached by Ben Jeffries. Yasmin Clydsdale was appointed captain and appeared in all thirteen matches.

Jersey numbers in the table reflect the Knights' Preliminary Final team list.

J#	Player	Age	Position(s)	NRLW Career			Past Seasons 2018-24	2025 NRLW					2025 Reps
J#	Player	Age	Position(s)	Debut	S	M	Past Seasons 2018-24	M	T	G	F	Pts	Int'l	Origin	Other
1	Botille Vette-Welsh	29	Fullback	2018	7	39	3 4 5 16	11	1	0	0	4	—	—	—
2	Sheridan Gallagher	23	Wing	2023	3	32	19	13	9	0	0	36	—	—	—
3	Shanice Parker	27	Centre	2019	6	46	5 28	13	3	0	0	12	3	—	1
4	Tenika Willison	27	Centre	2024	2	19	7	12	2	0	0	8	—	—	—
5	Keighley Simpson	20	Wing	2025	1	3	—	3	4	0	0	16	—	—	—
6	Georgia Roche	25	Five-eighth	2023	3	31	18	13	4	0	0	16	1	—	—
7	Jesse Southwell	20	Halfback	2022	4	40	27	13	2	41	0	90	3	3	—
8	Tayla Predebon	24	Prop	2021	5	46	7 27	12	1	0	0	4	—	—	—
9	Olivia Higgins	32	Hooker	2021	5	47	7 28	12	3	0	0	12	2	0	—
10	Tiana Davison	24	Prop	2022	4	29	8 8	13	2	0	0	8	2	—	—
11	Fane Finau	19	Second-row	2025	1	4	—	4	2	0	0	8	2	—	—
12	Yasmin Clydsdale	31	Second-row	2020	6	52	11 28	13	2	0	0	8	4	3	—
13	Kayla Romaniuk	23	Lock	2022	4	36	24	12	3	0	0	12	—	—	1
14	Jules Kirkpatrick	22	Second-row, Lock	2025	1	13	—	13	3	0	0	12	—	—	—
15	Simone Karpani	28	Prop	2021	5	33	6 18	9	0	0	0	0	0	—	—
16	Sienna Yeo	20	Lock	2025	1	13	—	13	2	0	0	8	—	—	—
17	Grace Giampino	21	Prop	2025	1	4	—	4	0	0	0	0	—	—	—
18	Viena Tinao	22	Prop	2023	3	15	10	5	0	0	0	0	—	—	—
19	Leilani Ahsam	19	Lock	—	0	0	—	0	0	0	0	0	2	—	—
20	Grace Kukutai	28	Hooker	2024	2	11	3	8	0	0	0	0	—	—	—
21	Lilly-Ann White	20	Wing, Fullback	2024	2	11	5	6	3	0	0	12	—	—	1
21	Leah Ollerton	21	Hooker	—	0	0	—	0	0	0	0	0	—	—	—
22	Joeli Morris	23	Hooker	2021	4	11	7	4	0	0	0	0	—	—	—
–	Evie Jones	20	Five-eighth	2024	1	5	5	0	0	0	0	0	—	—	—
–	Evah McEwen	19	Second-row, Centre	2024	2	11	2	9	3	0	0	12	—	—	1 U
–	Mercedez Taulelei-Siala	18	Wing	2025	1	1	—	1	1	0	0	4	1	—	—
DV	Mariah Brown	19	Centre	—	0	0	—	0	0	0	0	0	—	—	U
IS	Tess Staines	23	Wing	2022	4	17	3 8	6	4	0	0	16	—	—	—

Notes:

- The following players were signed on a Development contract for 2025:
  - Fane Finau
  - Mariah Brown
  - Grace Giampino
  - Mercedez Taulelei-Siala
  - Emily McArthur (added in September)

The Newcastle Knights had announced player signings in several instalments from June 2024.

== New Zealand Warriors ==
In their return to the NRL after a four season and nearly five year hiatus, the New Zealand Warriors were coached by Ronald Griffiths. Apii Nicholls was appointed captain and played in ten of the Warriors' eleven matches. Harata Butler deputised as captain in one match (Round 7).

Jersey numbers in the table reflect the Warriors' Round 11 team list.

J#	Player	Age	Position(s)	NRLW Career			Past Seasons 2018-24	2025 NRLW					2025 Reps
J#	Player	Age	Position(s)	Debut	S	M	Past Seasons 2018-24	M	T	G	F	Pts	Int'l	Origin	Other
1	Apii Nicholls	32	Fullback	2018	6	38	6 5 17	10	1	6	0	16	3	—	—
2	Tyra Wetere	19	Wing	2025	1	6	—	6	5	0	0	20	—	—	—
3	Tysha Ikenasio	28	Centre	2025	1	8	—	8	2	0	0	8	2	—	—
4	Payton Takimoana	22	Wing, Centre	2025	1	11	—	11	15	0	0	60	—	—	—
5	Lavinia Tauhalaliku	26	Wing	2025	2	7	4	3	1	0	0	4	—	—	—
6	Emmanita Paki	22	Centre, Halfback	2022	2	15	4	11	0	0	0	0	2	—	—
7	Lydia Turua-Quedley	26	Hooker, Halfback	2025	1	11	—	11	0	0	0	0	2	—	—
8	Matekino Gray	20	Prop, Second-row	2024	2	12	4	8	0	0	0	0	—	—	—
9	Capri Paekau	24	Hooker	2023	2	15	5	10	0	0	0	0	—	—	—
10	Lavinia Kitai	21	Prop	2025	1	11	—	11	0	0	0	0	2	—	—
11	Shakira Baker	33	Second-row, Five-eighth	2025	1	8	—	8	1	0	0	4	1	—	—
12	Kaiyah Atai	23	Lock, Prop	2025	1	11	—	11	1	0	0	4	2	—	—
13	Laishon Albert-Jones	27	Lock	2023	3	29	20	9	2	0	0	8	—	—	—
14	Avery-Rose Carmont	24	Hooker	2025	1	4	—	4	0	0	0	0	—	—	—
15	Harata Butler	32	Prop	2023	3	23	8 4	11	0	0	0	0	—	—	1
16	Ivana Lauitiiti	19	Prop	2025	1	6	—	6	2	0	0	8	3	—	—
17	Ashlee Matapo	18	Prop	2025	1	8	—	8	0	0	0	0	2	—	—
18	Makayla Eli	23	Second-row	2025	1	3	—	3	0	0	0	0	—	—	—
19	Paris Pickering	20	Centre	2025	1	2	—	2	0	0	0	0	—	—	—
20	Kalyn Takitimu-Cook	25	Wing	2025	1	2	—	2	0	0	0	0	—	—	—
21	Felila Kia	21	Second-row	2023	2	4	3	1	0	0	0	0	—	—	—
22	Metanoia Fotu-Moala	26	Prop	2025	1	5	—	5	1	0	0	4	—	—	—
C	Maarire Puketapu	23	Second-row	2025	1	10	—	10	0	0	0	0	—	—	—
IJ	Patricia Maliepo	22	Five-eighth	2025	1	9	—	9	4	17	0	50	2	—	—
M	Mya Hill-Moana	23	Prop	2021	4	25	25	0	0	0	0	0	—	—	—
DV	Sharnyze Pihema	20	Second-row	—	0	0	—	0	0	0	0	0	—	—	—
DV	Danii Gray	18	Hooker	—	0	0	—	0	0	0	0	0	—	—	—
IS	Emily Curtain	24	Halfback	2021	3	14	3 6	5	0	0	0	0	—	—	—
P	Michaela Brake	29	Wing	2025	1	4	—	4	2	0	0	8	—	—	—

Notes:

- The following players were signed on a Development contract for 2025:
  - Ivana Lautitiiti
  - Sharnyze Pihema

The New Zealand Warriors had announced player signings in several instalments from September 2024.

The Warriors confirmed their completed roster on 9 May 2025.

== North Queensland Cowboys ==
The North Queensland Cowboys were coached by Ricky Henry. Emma Manzelmann and Kirra Dibb were named joint captains. Manzelmann appeared in all twelve matches played by the Cowboys. Dibb appeared in nine matches.

Jersey numbers in the table reflect the Cowboys' Elimination Final team list.

J#	Player	Age	Position(s)	NRLW Career			Past Seasons 2018-24	2025 NRLW					2025 Reps
J#	Player	Age	Position(s)	Debut	S	M	Past Seasons 2018-24	M	T	G	F	Pts	Int'l	Origin	Other
1	Jakiya Whitfeld	24	Fullback, Centre	2022	4	29	2 9 9	9	4	0	0	16	3	—	—
2	Krystal Blackwell	22	Wing, Fullback	2023	3	27	15	12	5	0	0	20	—	—	—
3	Abigail Roache	29	Centre	2023	3	30	20	10	3	0	0	12	3	—	—
4	Jasmine Peters	23	Centre	2021	5	38	8 18	12	5	0	0	20	—	3	1 1
5	Francesca Goldthorp	22	Wing	2023	3	28	16	12	6	0	0	24	—	—	—
6	Kirra Dibb	28	Five-eighth, Halfback	2019	7	45	3 3 12 18	9	2	22	0	52	—	0	1 1
7	Tahlulah Tillett	27	Halfback	2021	4	27	4 15	8	0	0	0	0	—	—	—
8	Lillian Yarrow	21	Prop, Second-row	2024	2	15	3	12	1	0	0	4	—	—	1
9	Emma Manzelmann	23	Hooker	2021	5	42	12 18	12	3	4	0	20	—	—	—
10	Makenzie Weale	23	Prop	2022	4	24	4 9	11	2	0	0	8	—	3	1
11	Tallisha Harden	33	Second-row	2018	8	47	15 3 18	11	0	0	0	0	—	—	1
17	Essay Banu	23	Second-row, Prop	2023	3	20	8	12	0	0	0	0	1	—	1 1
13	Bree Chester	23	Lock	2023	3	29	17	12	1	0	0	4	—	—	1 1
14	Alisha Foord	28	Hooker	2023	3	16	4	12	2	0	0	8	—	—	—
15	Lily Peacock	20	Prop	2023	3	23	11	12	1	0	0	4	—	—	—
16	Tiana Raftstrand-Smith	22	Lock	2021	5	31	11 16	4	0	0	0	0	—	—	1
12	China Polata	23	Second-row	2021	4	18	1 14	3	1	0	0	4	—	—	—
18	Hailee-Jay Ormond-Maunsell	21	Second-row	2021	5	21	11	10	0	0	0	0	—	—	—
19	Ebony Raftstrand-Smith	20	Wing	2024	2	3	1	2	0	0	0	0	—	—	—
20	Rosie Kelly	25	Five-eighth, Halfback	2024	2	16	9	7	1	2	0	8	—	—	—
21	Lily Dick	25	Second-row	2025	1	4	—	4	0	0	0	0	—	—	—
22	Tafao Asaua	—	Prop	2024	2	3	2	1	0	0	0	0	—	—	—
–	Ana Malupo	19	Wing, Centre	2025	1	3	—	3	0	0	0	0	2	—	—
–	Najvada George	26	Lock	2019	5	31	3 6 18	4	0	0	0	0	—	—	1
–	Emily Bella	21	Halfback	—	0	0	—	0	0	0	0	0	—	—	—
DV	Caitlin Tanner	19	Halfback	—	0	0	—	0	0	0	0	0	2	—	U 1
DV	Jennifer Kimber	—	Fullback	—	0	0	—	0	0	0	0	0	—	—	U
–	Autumn-Rain Stephens-Daly	29	Wing, Five-eighth	2021	3	11	8 3	0	0	0	0	0	—	—	—
–	Tayla Curtis	22	Second-row	—	0	0	—	0	0	0	0	0	—	—	—

Notes:

- The following players were signed on a Development contract for 2025:
  - Tafao Asaua
  - Jennifer Kimber
  - Caitlin Tanner
- In addition to the full and development members of the squad, Tayla Curtis and Autumn-Rain Stephens-Daly were named to play in the trail match on 21 June 2025.

The North Queensland Cowboys announced player signings in several instalments from December 2024.

== Parramatta Eels ==
The Parramatta Eels are coached by Steve Georgallis. Mahalia Murphy captained the Eels in the eight matches in which she appeared. Abbi Church captained the Eels in their other three matches (Rounds 1, 2, and 11).

Jersey numbers in the table reflect the Eels' Round 11 team list.

J#	Player	Age	Position(s)	NRLW Career			Past Seasons 2018-24	2025 NRLW					2025 Reps
J#	Player	Age	Position(s)	Debut	S	M	Past Seasons 2018-24	M	T	G	F	Pts	Int'l	Origin	Other
1	Abbi Church	27	Fullback	2021	5	37	26	11	3	0	0	12	1	3	1
2	Kiana Takairangi	33	Wing	2019	4	15	2 6 5	2	3	0	0	12	2	—	—
3	Fleur Ginn	19	Centre, Five-eighth	2025	1	11	—	11	3	0	0	12	2	—	U 1
4	Lindsay Tui	20	Centre	2022	3	18	7	11	0	0	0	0	2	—	—
5	Martha Mataele	26	Wing	2025	1	11	—	11	7	0	0	28	2	—	—
6	Rosemarie Beckett	22	Five-eighth	2023	3	14	10	4	1	0	0	4	—	—	—
7	Rachael Pearson	32	Halfback	2021	5	38	12 15	11	3	27	0	66	—	—	—
8	Elsie Albert	29	Prop	2020	6	35	15 10	10	3	0	0	12	2	—	1
9	Rueben Cherrington	22	Hooker	2022	4	23	12	11	4	0	0	16	—	—	1
10	Breanna Eales	34	Prop	2023	3	18	4 4	10	0	0	0	0	—	—	—
11	Chloe Jackson	21	Second-row	2024	2	19	8	11	3	0	0	12	—	—	1
15	Paige Travis	26	Second-row	2025	1	11	—	11	0	0	0	0	1	—	—
13	Kennedy Cherrington	26	Lock	2020	6	33	4 23	6	0	0	0	0	—	3	1
14	Boss Kapua	20	Second-row, Prop	2023	3	10	5	5	0	0	0	0	—	—	—
18	Fontayne Tufuga	—	Hooker	2025	1	2	—	2	0	0	0	0	—	—	U
16	Tess McWilliams	19	Prop	2025	1	9	—	9	1	0	0	4	—	—	U
17	Ryvrr-Lee Alo	19	Lock	2025	1	10	—	10	1	0	0	4	2	—	U
19	Taneka Todhunter	23	Hooker	2023	3	21	13	8	0	0	0	0	—	—	1
22	Mia Middleton	22	Centre	2023	2	6	4	2	0	0	0	0	—	—	—
20	Ruby-Jean Kennard-Ellis	22	Prop	2022	4	15	14	1	0	0	0	0	—	—	—
21	Zali Fay	24	Wing	2022	4	33	24	9	0	0	0	0	—	—	1
12	Mahalia Murphy	31	Second-row	2020	4	29	3 18	8	3	0	0	12	0	—	1
–	Yasmine Baker	21	Fullback	—	0	0	—	0	0	0	0	0	—	—	—
–	Jessica Kennedy	22	Prop	2023	2	8	8	0	0	0	0	0	—	—	—
–	Chelsea Makira	20	Hooker	—	0	0	—	0	0	0	0	0	—	—	—
IJ	Rysh'e Fa'amausili	22	Centre, Second-row	2025	1	2	—	2	0	0	0	0	—	—	—
IJ	Rory Owen	21	Centre	2024	2	14	9	5	2	0	0	8	—	2	—
IJ	Cassey Tohi-Hiku	21	Five-eighth, Centre	2022	4	27	22	5	0	0	0	0	—	—	—
DV	Aaliyah Soufan	—	Halfback	—	0	0	—	0	0	0	0	0	—	—	—
IS	Tyla Amiatu	22	Prop	2023	3	14	13	1	0	0	0	0	—	—	—

Notes:

The Parramatta Eels announced player signings in several instalments from October 2024.

== St. George Illawarra Dragons ==
The St. George Illawarra Dragons are coached by Nathan Cross. Zali Hopkins and Raecene McGregor were appointed joint captains. Hopkins appeared in all eleven matches played by the Dragons. McGregor appeared in seven matches.

Jersey numbers in the table reflect the Dragons' Round 11 team list.

J#	Player	Age	Position(s)	NRLW Career			Past Seasons 2018-24	2025 NRLW					2025 Reps
J#	Player	Age	Position(s)	Debut	S	M	Past Seasons 2018-24	M	T	G	F	Pts	Int'l	Origin	Other
1	Teagan Berry	23	Fullback	2020	6	41	32	9	8	0	0	32	—	—	—
2	Maria Paseka	19	Wing	2024	2	5	1	4	3	0	0	12	2	—	U
3	Indie Bostock	18	Centre	2025	1	7	—	7	3	0	0	12	—	—	U
4	Keele Browne	23	Centre, Wing	2021	5	34	23	11	1	0	0	4	—	—	—
5	Jayme Millard	—	Wing	2025	1	8	—	8	1	7	0	18	—	—	—
6	Zali Hopkins	23	Hooker, Five-eighth	2022	4	30	19	11	2	0	0	8	—	—	—
6	Kasey Reh	19	Five-eighth, Halfback	2024	2	19	9	10	2	0	0	8	—	—	U 1
8	Madison Mulhall	21	Prop	2023	3	21	10	11	0	0	0	0	—	—	1
9	Nita Maynard-Perrin	33	Hooker	2018	8	45	11 4 3 19	8	0	0	0	0	—	—	—
10	Bronte Wilson	19	Prop	2024	2	13	4	9	1	0	0	4	1	—	U
11	Shenai Lendill	25	Second-row, Centre	2023	3	29	18	11	0	0	0	0	—	—	1
12	Hannah Southwell	26	Lock, Prop	2018	8	44	3 13 19	9	1	0	0	4	—	—	—
13	Trinity Tauaneai	18	Prop, Lock	2025	1	9	—	9	0	0	0	0	—	—	—
14	Tori Shipton	—	Hooker	2025	1	6	—	6	2	0	0	8	—	—	U 1
15	Ahlivia Ingram	24	Prop	2023	2	11	2	9	0	0	0	0	—	—	—
16	Tahlia O'Brien	—	Second-row	2025	1	3	—	3	0	0	0	0	—	—	—
17	Sara Sautia	23	Prop	2021	5	17	9 6	2	1	0	0	4	—	—	—
18	Tyra Ekepati	18	Fullback, Wing	2025	1	5	—	5	1	0	0	4	—	—	U
19	Charlotte Basham	20	Second-row	2022	3	17	8	9	1	0	0	4	—	—	—
20	Alice Gregory	27	Wing	2024	2	7	5	2	0	0	0	0	—	—	—
21	Mackenzie Lear	—	Prop	—	0	0	—	0	0	0	0	0	—	—	—
–	Grace Hamilton	33	Prop	2020	2	10	10	0	0	0	0	0	—	—	—
–	Sophie Clancy	22	Hooker, Lock	2023	2	8	8	0	0	0	0	0	—	—	—
–	Pia Tapsell	27	Prop	2025	1	5	—	5	0	0	0	0	—	—	—
C	Ella Koster	20	Second-row, Lock	2023	3	24	14	10	1	0	0	4	—	—	1
–	Jamilee McGregor	27	Lock, Prop	2023	3	20	16	4	0	0	0	0	1	—	—
–	Raecene McGregor	27	Halfback	2018	8	48	3 8 12 18	7	1	12	0	28	3	—	1
–	Maddie Studdon	30	Five-eighth	2018	6	15	2 6 5 1	1	0	1	0	2	—	—	—
DV	Seriah Palepale	17	Prop	—	0	0	—	0	0	0	0	0	—	—	—
DV	Paige Tauaneai	—	Second-row	—	0	0	—	0	0	0	0	0	—	—	—
IS	Bobbi Law	28	Centre, Wing	2019	7	28	2 11 13	2	0	0	0	0	—	—	1
IS	Margot Vella	26	Wing	2023	3	15	10	5	2	0	0	8	—	—	—

Notes:

- The following players were signed on a development contract for 2025:
  - Tahlia O'Brien
  - Maria Paseka
  - Seriah Palepale
  - Paige Tauaneai
- Tyra Ekepati sought and was granted a release from the Sydney Roosters after Round 2. The Dragons announced her signing prior to Round 5 and inclusion in the team.

The Dragons announced player 23 members of their squad of 24, plus two Development Players out of four, on 4 March 2025. The signing of Nita Maynard-Perrin was announced in May 2025.

== Sydney Roosters ==
The Sydney Roosters were coached by John Strange. The appointed captain, Isabelle Kelly, appeared in twelve of the thirteen matches played by the Roosters. Olivia Kernick captained the Roosters in the Round 10 match missed by the injured Kelly.

Jersey numbers in the table reflect the Roosters' Grand Final team list.

J#	Player	Age	Position(s)	NRLW Career			Past Seasons 2018-24	2025 NRLW					2025 Reps
J#	Player	Age	Position(s)	Debut	S	M	Past Seasons 2018-24	M	T	G	F	Pts	Int'l	Origin	Other
1	Brydie Parker	25	Fullback, Wing	2018	6	41	28	13	2	0	0	8	—	0	—
16	Mia Wood	26	Wing, Second-row	2023	3	27	14	13	5	0	0	20	—	—	—
3	Jessica Sergis	27	Centre	2018	8	46	10 23	13	8	0	0	32	4	3	—
4	Isabelle Kelly	28	Centre	2018	8	55	7 2 34	12	7	0	0	28	4	3	—
5	Jayme Fressard	28	Wing, Centre	2020	6	37	3 4 22	8	5	0	0	20	—	3	—
6	Corban Baxter	31	Five-eighth, Fullback	2019	5	31	22	9	1	0	0	4	—	—	—
7	Jocelyn Kelleher	25	Five-eighth, Halfback	2020	6	51	38	13	1	50	1	105	—	3	—
8	Otesa Pule	22	Prop	2022	4	40	27	13	1	0	0	4	3	—	—
9	Keeley Davis	25	Hooker	2018	8	56	23 20	13	3	0	0	12	2	3	—
10	Rima Butler	27	Prop	2022	4	33	5 15	13	5	0	0	20	3	—	1
11	Aliyah Nasio	19	Second-row	2024	2	16	4	12	2	0	0	8	—	—	—
12	Jasmin Strange	22	Second-row	2022	4	36	1 11 11	13	4	0	0	16	—	—	1
13	Olivia Kernick	24	Lock	2021	5	47	34	13	7	0	0	28	4	3	1
14	Shawden Burton	25	Hooker	2021	4	20	13	7	0	0	0	0	—	—	—
15	Macie Carlile	23	Prop	2023	2	15	3	12	2	0	0	8	—	—	—
17	Eliza Lopamaua	20	Prop	2024	2	15	4	11	1	0	0	4	2	—	—
18	Jayde Herdegen	20	Five-eighth, Halfback	—	0	0	—	0	0	0	0	0	—	—	—
20	Taneisha Gray	20	Second-row	2025	1	2	—	2	0	0	0	0	—	—	1
IJ	Amber Hall	30	Second-row	2019	7	40	18 11	11	4	0	0	16	—	—	—
21	Imogen Hei	19	Hooker	—	0	0	—	0	0	0	0	0	—	—	—
22	Tavarna Papalii	20	Lock	2024	1	8	8	0	0	0	0	0	2	3	—
IJ	Taina Naividi	24	Wing, Second-row	2021	3	22	5 6	11	11	0	0	44	—	—	—
–	Logan Fletcher	18	Wing	2025	1	1	—	1	1	0	0	4	—	—	U
DV	Ellie Brander	—	Prop	—	0	0	—	0	0	0	0	0	—	—	—
DV	Sienna Thomas	18	Halfback	—	0	0	—	0	0	0	0	0	—	—	—
DV	Mahlie Cashin	18	Hooker	—	0	0	—	0	0	0	0	0	—	—	—
DV	Talea Tonga	17	Halfback	—	0	0	—	0	0	0	0	0	—	—	—
IS	Tarryn Aiken	26	Halfback	2019	7	45	19 19	7	5	0	0	20	1	3	—
P	Millie Elliott	27	Prop	2019	6	38	13 7 18	0	0	0	0	0	—	—	—

Notes:

- The following players were signed on a Development contract for 2025.
  - Mahlie Cashin (who played for the Sydney Roosters Indigenous Academy, Tarsha Gale Cup side in 2025)
  - Sienna Thomas
  - Talea Tonga (who played for the Central Coast Roosters, Lisa Fiaola side in 2025)
- Millie Elliott missed the 2025 season due to pregnancy.

The Sydney Roosters announced player signings in several instalments from July 2024.

== Wests Tigers ==
The Wests Tigers were coached by Brett Kimmorley. Kezie Apps was appointed captain and appeared in all eleven matches played by the Wests Tigers.

Jersey numbers in the table reflect the Wests Tigers' Round 11 team list.

J#	Player	Age	Position(s)	NRLW Career			Past Seasons 2018-24	2025 NRLW					2025 Reps
J#	Player	Age	Position(s)	Debut	S	M	Past Seasons 2018-24	M	T	G	F	Pts	Int'l	Origin	Other
1	Evie McGrath	19	Five-eighth, Fullback	2024	2	9	3	6	0	0	0	0	—	—	U
2	Rebecca Pollard	26	Wing	2023	3	17	10	7	0	0	0	0	1	—	—
3	Harmony Crichton	19	Centre	2024	2	6	3	3	0	0	0	0	—	—	—
4	Emily Bass	26	Centre	2021	5	29	7 11	11	3	6	0	24	—	1	—
5	Lily Rogan	21	Centre, Wing	2023	2	11	1	10	1	0	0	4	2	—	—
6	Jetaya Faifua	22	Fullback, Five-eighth	2021	5	29	7 11	11	2	0	0	8	2	—	—
7	Faythe Manera	22	Halfback, Five-eighth	2025	1	9	—	9	1	0	0	4	—	—	—
8	Sarah Togatuki	27	Prop	2018	7	46	19 16	11	1	0	0	4	2	3	—
9	Salma Nour	22	Hooker	2023	3	17	10	7	2	0	0	8	1	—	—
10	Ruby Fifita	25	Prop	2025	1	1	—	1	0	0	0	0	2	—	—
11	Kezie Apps	34	Second-row	2018	8	40	19 10	11	1	0	0	4	4	3	—
12	Montana Clifford	21	Second-row	2024	2	11	4	7	0	0	0	0	—	—	—
13	Portia Bourke	25	Second-row, Centre	2025	1	4	—	4	0	0	0	0	—	—	—
15	Tara Reinke	26	Lock	2023	3	27	7 9	11	0	0	0	0	—	—	—
14	Pihuka Berryman-Duff	24	Hooker, Lock	2023	2	20	9	11	1	0	0	4	2	—	—
18	Iemaima Etuale	19	Lock	2025	1	5	—	5	0	0	0	0	—	—	—
16	Jade Fonua	28	Second-row, Lock	2023	3	25	14	11	0	0	0	0	2	—	—
17	Amelia Huakau	30	Lock, Prop	2020	3	21	1 9	11	0	0	0	0	2	—	—
19	Jessikah Reeves	24	Prop	2023	2	8	5	3	0	0	0	0	2	—	1
20	Tiana-Lee Thorne	18	Wing	2024	2	4	3	1	1	0	0	4	—	—	—
21	Chelsea Savill	20	Hooker	2024	2	9	3	6	0	0	0	0	—	—	—
C	Caitlin Turnbull	24	Wing, Fullback	2025	1	10	—	10	8	0	0	32	—	—	U 1
–	Claudia Brown	20	Second-row, Prop	2024	1	2	2	0	0	0	0	0	—	—	—
DV	Aaliyah Bula	20	Centre	—	0	0	—	0	0	0	0	0	—	—	—
IJ	Lucyannah Luamanu-Leiataua	18	Lock	2025	1	4	—	4	0	0	0	0	—	—	—
IJ	Losana Lutu	21	Halfback	2022	4	17	1 12	4	0	2	0	4	—	—	—
IJ	Christian Pio	25	Prop	2021	5	33	11 18	4	0	0	0	0	—	—	—
IJ	Terina Te Tamaki	28	Wing, Centre	2025	1	4	—	4	0	0	0	0	—	—	—
DV	Tallara Bamblett	21	Five-eighth	—	0	0	—	0	0	0	0	0	—	—	—
DV	Tiresa Leasuasu	19	Lock	—	0	0	—	0	0	0	0	0	—	—	—
P	Rikeya Horne	26	Centre, Wing	2018	7	34	7 11 16	0	0	0	0	0	—	—	—
IS	Claudia Nielsen	—	Wing	2024	2	3	2	1	0	0	0	0	—	—	—
IS	Brooke Talataina	21	Second-row, Halfback	2023	2	12	12	0	0	0	0	0	—	—	—

Notes:

- The following players were signed on a Development contract for 2025.
  - Aaliyah Bula
  - Tallara Bamblett
  - Tiresa Leasuasu
  - Lucyannah Luamanu-Leiataua

The Wests Tigers announced player signings from March 2025.
