= List of 2026–27 NRL Women's transfers =

This is a list of player transfers involving NRL Women's Premiership teams before or during the 2027 NRL Women's season.

== Transfers ==
Table last updated: 22 November 2026

2027 NRLW transfers
Player	2026 club	2027 club	Length of deal (years)	Announcement date	Reference
Tori Shipton	St George Illawarra Dragons (Sup)	Newcastle Knights	2	15 Jan 2026	
Emma Verran	Cronulla-Sutherland Sharks (Pregnancy)	St George Illawarra Dragons	3	12 Feb 2026	
Alexis Tauaneai	Canterbury-Bankstown Bulldogs	St George Illawarra Dragons	2	19 Mar 2026	
Angelina Teakaraanga-Katoa	Canterbury-Bankstown Bulldogs	St George Illawarra Dragons	1	20 Mar 2026	
Destiny Mino-Sinapati	Gold Coast Titans	Brisbane Broncos	2	7 Aug 2026	
Teagan Berry	St George Illawarra Dragons	Cronulla-Sutherland Sharks	2	22 Sep 2026	
Zali Hopkins	St George Illawarra Dragons	North Queensland Cowboys	3	30 Sep 2026	
Mamele Misa	Souths Logan Magpies	Parramatta Eels	2	8 Oct 2026	
Rima Butler	Sydney Roosters	Wests Tigers	3	12 Oct 2026	
Martha Mataele	Parramatta Eels	Brisbane Broncos	2	15 Oct 2026	
Jayme Millard	St George Illawarra Dragons	Wests Tigers	2	15 Oct 2026	
Sara Sautia	St George Illawarra Dragons	North Queensland Cowboys	2	15 Oct 2026	
Amanii Misa	Brisbane Broncos	North Queensland Cowboys	3	15 Oct 2026	
Makenzie Weale	North Queensland Cowboys	St George Illawarra Dragons	3	16 Oct 2026	
Sereana Naitokatoka	Canberra Raiders	Wests Tigers	3	20 Oct 2026	
Anastasia Leatupue	Sydney Roosters (Dev)	Wests Tigers	3	20 Oct 2026	
Ashleigh Quinlan	Bulldogs	North Queensland Cowboys	2	21 Oct 2026	
Chelsea Savill	St George Illawarra Dragons (Dev)	York Valkyrie	1	4 Nov 2026	
Mercedez Taulelei-Siala	Newcastle Knights	Canterbury-Bankstown Bulldogs	2	6 Nov 2026	
Brooke Anderson	St George Illawarra Dragons	Cronulla-Sutherland Sharks	2	11 Nov 2026	
Rosie Kelly	North Queensland Cowboys	Canterbury-Bankstown Bulldogs	3	12 Nov 2026	
Chloe Pallisier	Penrith Panthers	St George Illawarra Dragons (Sup)	2	18 Nov 2026	
Krissy Scurfield	Canada Rugby Sevens	North Queensland Cowboys	1	21 Nov 2026	

Club by club
The watershed date for the players extended section of each club, below, is 1 June 2026. Players are listed if the announcement of their contract extension occurred on or after 1 June 2026.

== Brisbane Broncos ==
=== Players in ===
- Destiny Mino-Sinapati from Titans
- Martha Mataele from Eels

=== Players out ===
- Amanii Misa to Cowboys

Retirement

- Ali Brigginshaw

Released

- Skyla Adams
- Breanna Eales (Dev)
- Linneke Gevers (Sup)
- Azalleyah Maaka
- Tara McGrath-West
- Caitlin Urwin

Off contract

- Rhemy Hinckesman
- Kerri Johnson
- Deleni Paitai (Sup)

== Canberra Raiders ==
=== Players extended ===
- Hollie-Mae Dodd (2029)

=== Players out ===
- Sereana Naitokatoka to Tigers

Off contract

- Emma Barnes
- Madison Bartlett
- Charlotte Basham
- Lili Boyle
- Elise Simpson
- Chanté Temara
- Zahara Temara
- Madyson Tooth
- Mackenzie Wiki

== Canterbury-Bankstown Bulldogs ==
=== Players in ===
- Rosie Kelly from Cowboys
- Mercedez Taulelei-Siala from Knights

=== Players extended ===
- Moana Courtenay (2027)
- Simina Lokotui (2027)

=== Players out ===
- Alexis Tauaneai to Dragons
- Angelina Teakaraanga-Katoa to Dragons
- Ashleigh Quinlan to Cowboys

Released

- Ma’atuleio Fotu-Moala
- Bridget Hoy
- Shaquaylah Mahakitau-Monschau
- Elizabeth MacGregor
- Evah McEwen
- Ebony Prior
- Latisha Smythe
- Paea Uilou
- Waimarie Martin

Off contract

- Kalosipani Hopoate
- Tamika Jones
- Hope Millard
- Daynah Nankivell
- Evelyn Roberts
- Andie Robinson
- Giovanna Suani (Rpl)
- Pauline Suli-Ruka
- Monica Tagoai
- Mary-Jane Taito
- Leilani Wilson (Sup)

== Cronulla-Sutherland Sharks ==
=== Players in ===
- Brooke Anderson from Dragons
- Teagan Berry from Dragons

=== Players extended ===
- Jaydika Tafua (2028)

=== Players out ===
- Emma Verran to Dragons

Released

- Caitlan Johnston-Green

Off contract

- Jacinta Carter
- Najvada George
- Talei Holmes
- Tyla King (Pregnancy)
- Georgia Ravics
- Cassie Staples
- Manilita Takapautolo
- Koffi Brookfield (Sup)
- Milla Elaro (Rpl)
- Olivia Herman (Dev)
- Madison Higgins-Ashby (Rpl)
- Marewakiterangi Samson (Dev)

== Gold Coast Titans ==
=== Players extended ===
- Takoda Thompson(2027)
- Laikha Clarke (2028)

=== Players out ===
- Destiny Mino-Sinapati to Broncos

Released

- Aleksandra Tunufai

Off contract

- Enah Desic
- Georgia Grey
- Georgia Hale
- Rilee Jorgensen
- Teagan Levi
- Lailani Montgomery
- Te Ngaroahiahi Fanua Awhina Rimoni
- Pauline Piliae-Rasabale
- Jasmine Solia
- Sienna Ibrahim (Dev)
- Lily Patston (Sup)

== Newcastle Knights ==
=== Players in ===
- Tori Shipton from Dragons

=== Players extended ===
- Tiana Davison (2029)
- Olivia Higgins (2027)
- Georgia Roche (2030)
- Sidney Taylor (2028)

=== Players out ===
- Mercedez Taulelei-Siala to Bulldogs

Off contract

- Nakia Davis-Welsh
- Fane Finau
- Stella Lewis
- Joeli Morris
- Cheyelle Robins-Reti
- Sienna Yeo
- Grace Giampino (Sup)
- Emily McArthur (Dev)
- Lucy Spain (Dev)

== New Zealand Warriors ==
=== Players out ===
Off contract

- Laishon Albert-Jones
- Harata Butler
- Matekino Gray
- Jasmin Huriwai
- Felila Kia
- Patricia Maliepo
- Apii Nicholls
- Capri Paekau
- Emmanita Paki
- Payton Takimoana
- Lavinia Tauhalaliku
- Tyra Wetere
- Shakira Baker (CO)
- Metanoia Fetalaiga (CO)
- Natalia Hickling (Rpl)
- Christabelle Onesemo-Tuilaepa (Sup)
- Anastasia Sekene (Sup)
- Ocean Tierney (Dev)

== North Queensland Cowboys ==
=== Players in ===
- Zali Hopkins from Dragons
- Amanda Misa from Broncos
- Ashleigh Quinlan from Bulldogs
- Sara Sautia from Dragons
- Krissy Scurfield from Canada 7s

=== Players extended ===
- Fran Goldthorp (2028)
- Lily Peacock (2028)
- Abigail Roache (2028)

=== Players out ===
- Rosie Kelly to Bulldogs
- Mackenzie Weale to Dragons

Retired

- Tallisha Harden

Released

- Tallara Bamblett (Rpl) (6)
- Ella Cronin (Dev) (0)
- Lily Dick (8)
- Haylee Hifo (Rpl) (2)
- Jennifer Kimber (0)
- Lyrech Mara (Sup) (1)
- Ebony Raftstrand-Smith (0)
- Tiana Raftstrand-Smith (7)
- Emily Veivers (2)
- Sian Williams (3)
- Nadia Windleborn (Dev) (5)

Off contract

- Tafao Asaua (5)
- Alisha Foord (8)
- Hailee-Jay Ormond-Maunsell (7)
- Kayla Jackson (Dev) (3)
- Charlize Lloyd-Phillips (Sup) (7)
- Margot Vella (Rpl) (11)

== Parramatta Eels ==
=== Players in ===
- Mamele Misa from Souths Logan Magpies

=== Players extended ===
- Keilee Joseph (2028)

=== Players out ===
- Martha Mataele to Broncos

Released

- Rosemarie Beckett (CO)
- Kate Fallon
- Zali Fay
- Mahalia Murphy (CO)
- Kiana Takairangi (Sup)
- Taneka Todhunter

Off contract

- Khyliah Gray (Sup)

== St. George Illawarra Dragons ==
=== Players in ===
- Chloe Pallisier (Sup) from Panthers
- Angelina Teakaraanga-Katoa from Bulldogs
- Alexis Tauaneai from Bulldogs
- Emma Verran from Sharks
- Mackenzie Weale from Cowboys

Promotion

- Halle Barrett (Dev)

=== Players extended ===
- Keele Browne (2028)
- Ruby-Jean Kennard-Ellis (Sup) (2027)

=== Players out ===
- Teagan Berry to Sharks
- Zali Hopkins to Cowboys
- Jayme Millard to Tigers
- Sara Sautia to Cowboys
- Chelsea Savill (Dev) to York Valkyrie
- Tori Shipton to Knights

Released

- Brooke Anderson
- Nita Maynard-Perrin
- Seriah Palepale
- Hannah Southwell

Off contract

- Ahlivia Ingram
- Arabella McKenzie
- Maria Paseka
- Kasey Reh
- Bronte Wilson
- Amelia Huakau (Sup)
- Tahlia O'Brien (Rpl)

== Sydney Roosters ==
=== Players extended ===
- Otesa Pule (2028)
- Keeley Nizza (2027)
- Jasmin Strange (2028)

=== Players out ===
- Rima Butler to Wests Tigers
- Anastasia Leatupue to Wests Tigers

Retirement

- Corban Baxter
- Millie Elliott

Off contract

- Tatum Bird
- Taneisha Gray
- Amber Hall
- Isabelle Kelly
- Sariah Paki
- Keighley Simpson (Sup)
- Talea Tonga
- Mia Wood

== Wests Tigers ==
=== Players in ===
- Rima Butler from Roosters
- Anastasia Leatupue (Dev) from Roosters
- Jayme Millard from Dragons
- Sereana Naitokatoka from Raiders

=== Players extended ===
- Shaylee Bent (Rpl) (2030)
- Faythe Manera (2028)
- Shaniece Monschau (2027)
- Salma Nour (Rpl) (2027)
- Holli Wheeler (2027)

=== Players out ===
Released

- Pihuka Berryman-Duff (Pregnancy)
- Portia Bourke
- Harmony Crichton
- Jetaya Faifua
- Jade Fonua (Pregnancy)
- Leah Ollerton
- Lily Rogan
- Terina Te Tamaki

Off contract

- Tyla Amiatu (Sup)
- Kayla Henderson (Dev)
- Losana Lutu
- Brooke Talataina

== Players off contract after 2027 ==
The following players are off contract with their current club at the end of the 2027 NRLW season.

Brisbane Broncos

- Georgia Bartlett
- Destiny Brill
- Brianna Clark
- Lauren Dam
- Reegan Hicks
- Chelsea Lenarduzzi
- Shannon Mato
- Tavarna Papalii
- Julia Robinson
- Shalom Sauaso
- Jesse Southwell
- Bree Spreadborough
- Romy Teitzel
- Tamika Upton
- Lillian Yarrow

Canberra Raiders

- Krystal Blackwell
- Ellie Brander
- Sheridan Gallagher
- Sophie Holyman
- Grace Kemp
- Grace Kukutai
- Bobbi Law
- Jordyn Preston
- Chloe Saunders
- Simaima Taufa
- Leianne Tufuga
- Isabella Waterman
- Relna Wuruki-Hosea

Canterbury-Bankstown Bulldogs

- Moana Courtenay
- Simina Lokotui

Cronulla Sharks

- Annessa Biddle
- Rhiannon Byers
- Quincy Dodd
- Tegan Dymock
- Stephanie Faulkner
- Filomina Hanisi
- Georgia Hannaway
- Ellie Johnston
- Caitlan Johnston-Green
- Anne-Marie Kiria-Ratu
- Chantay Kiria-Ratu
- Tiana Penitani Gray
- China Polata
- Jada Taylor
- Grace-Lee Weekes

Gold Coast Titans

- Indie Bostock
- Lauren Brown
- Jaime Chapman
- Phoenix-Raine Hippi
- Lily Kolc
- Ivana Lolesio
- Sarina Masaga
- Evania Pelite
- Natasha Penitani
- Eta Sikahele
- Takoda Thompson

Newcastle Knights

- Olivia Higgins
- Evie Jones
- Simone Karpani
- Jules Kirkpatrick
- Yasmin Meakes
- Amelia Pasikala
- Botille Vette-Welsh
- Lilly-Ann White
- Tenika Willison

New Zealand Warriors

- Kaiyah Atai
- Gayle Broughton
- Mya Hill-Moana
- Mele Hufanga
- Tysha Ikenasio
- Ivana Lauitiiti
- Ashlee Matapo
- Maarire Puketapu
- Stacey Waaka

North Queensland Cowboys

- Tayla Curtis
- Ashley Marsters
- Jasmine Peters
- Lydia Turua-Quedley

Parramatta Eels

- Elsie Albert
- Ryvrr-Lee Alo
- Kennedy Cherrington
- Rueben Cherrington
- Fleur Ginn
- Jayde Herdegen
- Chloe Jackson
- Keilee Joseph
- Boss Kapua
- Tess McWilliams
- Layne Morgan
- Jasmin Morrissey
- Rory Owen
- Rachael Pearson
- Lindsay Tui

St George Illawarra Dragons

- Tyra Ekepati
- Taliah Fuimaono
- Montaya Hudson
- Ruby-Jean Kennedy-Ellis
- Ella Koster
- Angelina Teakaraanga-Katoa

Sydney Roosters

- Tarryn Aiken
- Shawden Burton
- Macie Carlile
- Jayme Fressard
- Jocelyn Kelleher
- Olivia Kernick
- Eliza Lopamaua
- Taina Naividi
- Aliyah Nasio
- Keeley Nizza
- Brydie Parker
- Jessica Sergis

Wests Tigers

- Emily Bass
- Namoe Gesa
- Rikeya Horne
- Shenai Lendill
- Lucyannah Luamanu-Leiataua
- Raecene McGregor
- Shaniece Monschau
- Leah Ollerton
- Christian Pio
- Tara Reinke
- Holli Wheeler

== Key to acronyms and abbreviations used above ==
- (CO) - Club option
- (MO) - Mutual option
- (PO) - Player option
- Numbers in parentheses alongside a player's name are the number of NRLW games played in the 2026 season.
- Dev - Development contract
- Sup - Supplementary contract
- Rpl - Replacement player, brought into the squad to cover the absence of an originally contracted player unavailable due to pregnancy or an injury requiring a long-term recovery.
- NSW - The NSWRL Harvey Norman Women's Premiership, a second-tier or reserve grade competition that sits below the NRLW in New South Wales
  - The Canberra Raiders Women have a pathways arrangement with NSWRL Harvey Norman Women's Premiership club, Mounties.
  - From the 2026 season, the New Zealand Warriors Women have a pathways arrangement with NSWRL Harvey Norman Women's Premiership club, South Sydney Rabbitohs.
- QLD - The QRL BMD Women's Premiership, a second-tier or reserve grade competition that sits below the NRLW in Queensland
- Under 19
  - The Tarsha Gale Cup in New South Wales and Australian Capital Territory
  - The Harvey Norman U19s in Queensland
- Under 17
  - The Lisa Fiaola Cup in New South Wales and Australian Capital Territory
  - The Harvey Norman U17s in Queensland
- Union - Rugby union
  - Super Rugby Pacific (Australia and Fiji)
  - Super Rugby Aupiki (New Zealand)
  - Women's Rugby World Cup
- Sevens - Rugby union sevens
  - International sevens
  - NextGen Sevens tournament in Australia for development players
