= Nu'uausala =

Nu'uausala is a Samoan surname. Notable people with the surname include:

- Annetta Nu'uausala (born 1995), New Zealand rugby league footballer, sister of Frank-Paul
- Frank-Paul Nu'uausala (born 1987), New Zealand rugby league footballer
