= Sancta Maria College, Auckland =

Sancta Maria College

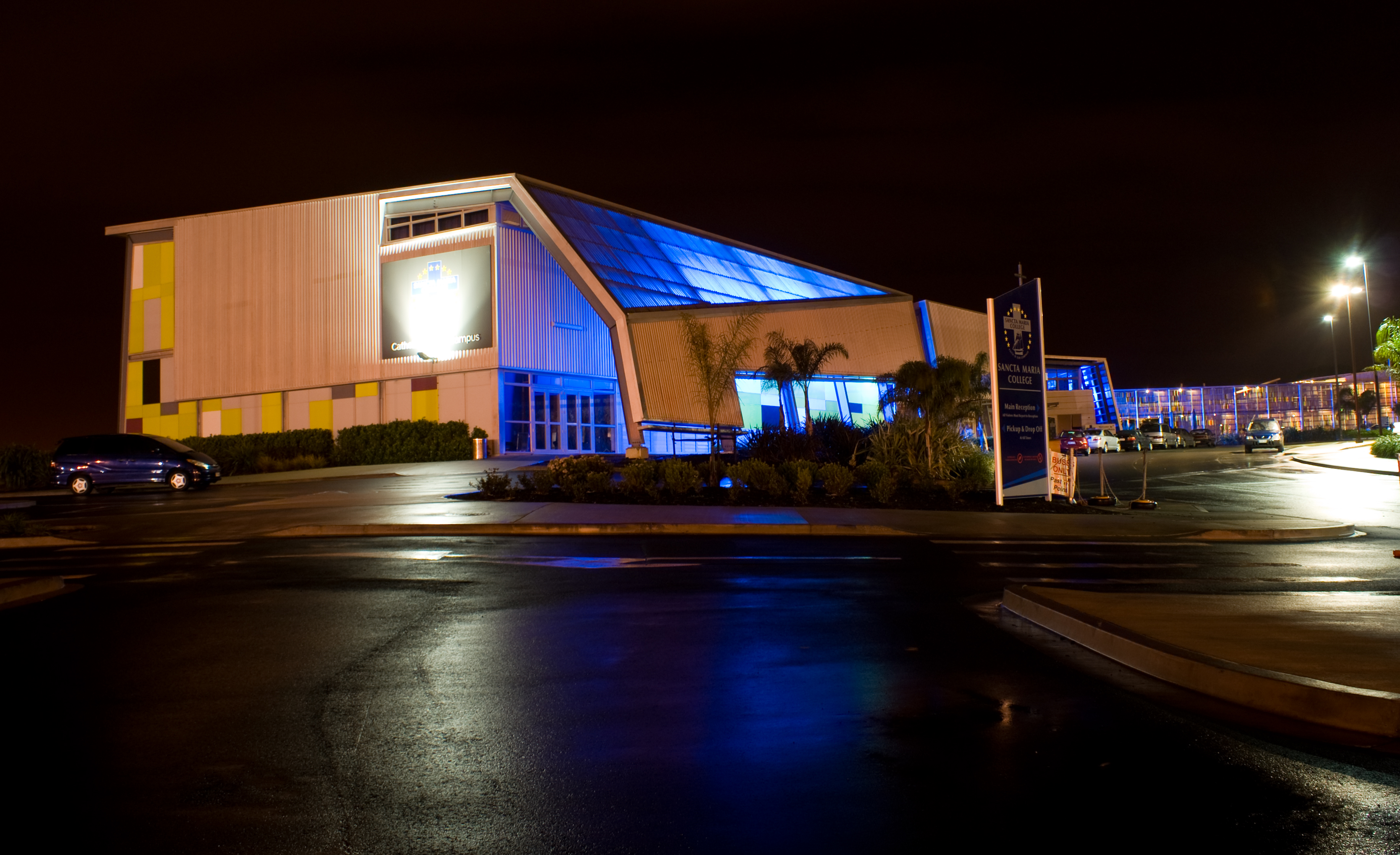
- Sancta Maria College in 2009.

Location
- 319 Te Irirangi Drive; Flat Bush; Auckland 2013; New Zealand; 36.9600°S 174.9054°E

Information
- Type: State integrated co-ed secondary, years 7–13
- Motto: Faith is our compass
- Established: 2004; 22 years ago
- Ministry of Education Institution no.: 491
- Principal: Andrew Mackenzie
- Enrolment: 1,049 (July 2026)
- Website: sanctamaria.school.nz

Sancta Maria College is a co-ed Catholic School in Auckland, New Zealand. It is named after the schooner on which Bishop Pompallier travelled around New Zealand.

== Sancta Maria College ==
Bishop Pompallier, who is a specially honoured pioneer of the New Zealand Catholic Church, arrived in the Hokianga from France in 1838 with a group of Marist Priests and Brothers. With this group, he sailed around New Zealand converting settlers to Catholicism in the early 1840s.

Fathers Garin and Viard who accompanied Bishop Pompallier established churches in Howick and Panmure. Bishop Pompallier devised his own flag for the vessel – a bunting version of the Miraculous Medal, It consisted of a blue cross surmounting a large M and surrounded by twelve stars. The background was white. These twelve stars have been incorporated into the school logo along with the Sancta Maria and the school's motto 'FAITH IS OUR COMPASS'.

The College's name commemorates the historic arrival and work of Bishop Pompallier. The school caters for Year 7-13

== History ==
Sancta Maria College was built in 2004 and was used as a 'transfer' school from St Mark's and Star of the Sea Primary schools in Howick and Pakuranga, New Zealand.

There has been a notable increase in the population of students and the school has also been expanded to include 6 classroom 'blocks'. When Sancta Maria Catholic Primary School came in the year of 2010 they shared the same auditorium for assemblies and masses and so the college built a new gym for P.E.

When it was first built, Sancta Maria College only supported students from Years 7–9, the same as Botany Downs Secondary College, due to lack of teaching space, but now it is a fully functional school from Years 7–13.

== Classrooms ==
The school's construction of grouped classrooms has been divided up into 'blocks', named after Saints.

Saint Anne Block is a three-story block with approximately 12 classrooms, which are used for the main social sciences, English and mathematics.

Saint Benedict Block is a two-story block, with the top three classrooms being used for music and Information Communication Technology (ICT) Labs, as well as the Careers Office and the Guidance Counselor's Office, new built library the Dean of Year Level's offices and a few small meeting rooms.

The next block is the Saint Catherine Block. The Saint Catherine Block, along with the Saint Benedict Block, were the first two blocks of classrooms in the foundation year. The Saint Catherine Block's top level is mainly for the sciences with five classrooms equipped for experiments and of the other four, three of which are being used for religious educations lessons with the final two being used for languages (specifically French and Japanese respectively). The bottom 10 classrooms are devoted to the technologies, with the first being information communication technology, with 30 flat screen computers into which students login using their own user id, the next adjoining classroom is for fabric technology, such as sewing and designing. Then there is the spare technology room used for Early Childhood Education, and the next is for food technology, which is used for cooking and baking. Next is the design technology room which is graphics, construction design, which in the future may incorporate CADD. After that is the building technology room, with woodwork and metalwork and electronics classrooms.

The fourth block is Saint Dominic Block, which houses Year 7 and Year 8 students. Between every two classrooms is a 'pod' with approximately 10–15 computers for the classes to use if needed. The only exception is the last half of the bottom level which splits between art and languages, and the last third of the top level which is for 'Business Studies', or economics and accounting.

A library is there with 4 classroom underneath for RE

A new gymnasium equipped with a fitness centre and physical education offices was opened in 2010. There is also an auditorium which is used for assemblies and other large events or gatherings. The school chapel and priest's office are also in the building complex with the auditorium. The chapel displays the icon which was specifically painted for Sancta Maria College. Also a turf is now there with a shade cover to protect from sun

The administration building houses the sick bay, cashier's office, reception desk, meeting rooms, staff room and staff offices.

Both Anne and Catherine blocks are equipped with a set of COW's (Computers On Wheels) for individual student use.

From February to August 2017, construction took place under the school library. This was so that the lower story of the library could be converted into a Modern Learning Environment, to be used exclusively by the Religious Education department of the school. Current plans are for the block to be named 'Saint Francis Block'. Saint Francis Block can hold four classes at a time, and will be a shared space for all year levels.

== Education ==
Sancta Maria College offers NCEA as its national qualifications standard and each year students results are significantly higher than national averages. They have a system of 'impositions' for misbehaviour and rule infringement which can lead up to an afterschool detention or a Saturday detention for continued or more serious offences.

== Houses ==
The houses of Sancta Maria College are named after ports or harbours in New Zealand at which Bishop Pompallier's schooner landed. The four houses are:

- Akaroa – Yellow
- Waitemata – Green
- Kororareka – Red
- Hokianga – Blue

== Alumni ==
- Tysha Ikenasio (born 1997) – rugby sevens player.
