= Ronald Griffiths =

Australian RL coach

Ron Griffiths
Personal information
- Full name: Ronald Griffiths

Coaching information
Club
Years	Team	Gms	W	D	L	W%
2022–23	Newcastle Knights	18	16	0	2	89
2025–	New Zealand Warriors	11	4	0	7	36
	Total	29	20	0	9	69
Representative
Years	Team	Gms	W	D	L	W%
2023–26	Indigenous All Stars	4	2	1	1	50
2025	Cook Islands	2	2	0	0	100
- Source: As of 11 April 2026

Ronald Griffiths is an Australian professional rugby league football coach who is the head coach of the New Zealand Warriors in the NRL Women's Premiership. He previously coached the Newcastle Knights, winning two premierships with them.

== Background ==
Griffiths is of Indigenous Australian descent. He played junior rugby league for the Woodberry Warriors.

== Coaching career ==
=== Early years ===
In 2012, Griffiths coached the Maitland Pickers in the Newcastle Rugby League, as well as mentoring the under-16s New South Wales Koori side. In 2014, he coached the Greta-Branxton Colts as well as being a pathways coach with the New South Wales VB Cup representative side. In 2016, he became head coach at the Kurri Kurri Bulldogs. In 2019, he worked with the coaching staff at the Wests Tigers, before taking up an assistant coach role with the team in 2020. In 2021, he was a part of the coaching staff for the Indigenous All Stars side.

=== 2022 ===
In April 2022, Griffiths was announced as the head coach of the Newcastle Knights' NRLW team. The team won 4 of its 5 regular season games, before winning the semi-final match and ultimately winning the 2022 NRLW Premiership, the Knights' defeating the Parramatta Eels 32–12.

=== 2023 ===
Griffiths would coach the NRLW team to another premiership win in 2023, before being announced as the Knights' NSW Cup head coach going into 2024.

=== 2024 ===
On 1 July, the New Zealand Warriors announced the appointment of Griffiths as head coach of their NRLW team, who return to the competition in 2025. Griffiths was appointed on a three-year deal. The Newcastle Knights confirmed that Griffiths will depart the club at the conclusion of the 2024 NSW Cup season.
