= Matekino Gray =

New Zealand rugby league footballer

Personal information
- Full name: Matekino Kahukoti-Gray
- Born: 16 March 2005 (age 21) Whangamatā, Waikato, New Zealand
- Height: 175 cm (5 ft 9 in)
- Weight: 75 kg (11 st 11 lb)

Playing information
- Position: Prop, Second-row
Club
Years	Team	Pld	T	G	FG	P
2024	Gold Coast Titans	4	0	0	0	0
2025–	New Zealand Warriors	11	0	0	0	0
	Total	15	0	0	0	0
- Source: As of 1 November 2026

Matekino Gray is a rugby league footballer who plays as a prop for the New Zealand Warriors Women.

== Background ==
Born in Whangamata, New Zealand. Gray was raised in Rotorua before moving to Gold Coast.

== Playing career ==
=== Early career ===
In 2022, Gray came off the bench in every game for the Tweed Heads Seagulls.

In round 7, Gray scored her first try in the QRL Women's Premiership against Brisbane Tigers. Gray finished the season with the Burleigh Bears playing 8 games and scoring a try. On 13 July, Gray played second row for the Queensland Maroons in the 2023 Women's Under 19 State of Origin.

=== 2024 ===
In 2024, Gray finished her second season with Burleigh Bears playing 7 games. On 20 June, Gray played prop for the Queensland Maroons in the 2024 Women's Under 19 State of Origin.

In round 4, Gray made her debut against the North Queensland Cowboys. Due to a shoulder injury Gray was ruled out for the rest of the 2024 NRL Women's season. On 18 September, Gray signed with the New Zealand Warriors.

=== 2025 ===
On 6 July, Gray made her debut for the New Zealand Warriors.
