= Apii Nicholls-Pualau =

NZ international rugby league & union player

Apii Nicholls
Personal information
- Born: 26 February 1993 (age 33) Rarotonga, Cook Islands, New Zealand
- Height: 163 cm (5 ft 4 in)
- Weight: 62 kg (9 st 11 lb)

Playing information

Rugby league
- Position: Fullback
Club
| Years | Team | Pld | T | G | FG | P |
|---|---|---|---|---|---|---|
| 2018–19 | New Zealand Warriors | 6 | 0 | 7 | 0 | 14 |
| 2022–23 | Gold Coast Titans | 5 | 0 | 0 | 0 | 0 |
| 2023–24 | Canberra Raiders | 17 | 1 | 0 | 0 | 4 |
| 2025– | New Zealand Warriors | 18 | 2 | 6 | 0 | 20 |
| | Total | 46 | 3 | 13 | 0 | 38 |
Representative
| Years | Team | Pld | T | G | FG | P |
| 2017–26 | New Zealand | 23 | 8 | 7 | 0 | 46 |
| 2019 | New Zealand 9s | 4 | 0 | 0 | 0 | 0 |

Rugby union
Club
| Years | Team | Pld | T | G | FG | P |
|---|---|---|---|---|---|---|
| 2023–24 | Chiefs Manawa | 6 | 0 | 0 | 0 | 0 |
Representative
| Years | Team | Pld | T | G | FG | P |
| | Cook Islands 7s |
- Source: RLP As of 15 November 2026

Apii Nicholls (born 26 February 1993) is a New Zealand rugby league and union player. She captains the New Zealand Warriors in the NRL Women's Premiership. Primarily a fullback, she is a New Zealand representative.

In 2023, she was signed by Chiefs Manawa for the Super Rugby Aupiki competition.

== Background ==
Born in Rarotonga, Nicolls-Paualau represented the Cook Islands rugby sevens team before switching to rugby league.

== Playing career ==
=== Otahuhu Leopards ===
In 2017, Nicholls-Paulau began playing for the Otahuhu Leopards in the Auckland Rugby League. Later that year, she was selected to represent New Zealand at the 2017 Women's Rugby League World Cup. She captained the team in a 50–4 win over Canada. On 2 December 2017, she started at fullback in New Zealand's final loss to Australia.

On 11 February 2018, she was named the NZRL Women's Player of the Year. On 1 August 2018, she joined the New Zealand Warriors NRL Women's Premiership team. In Round 1 of the 2018 NRL Women's season, she made her debut for the Warriors, kicking a goal in a 10–4 win over the Sydney Roosters.

=== International ===
In October 2019, Nicholls-Pualau was a member of New Zealand's 2019 Rugby League World Cup 9s-winning squad.

In October 2022, she was selected for the New Zealand squad at the delayed 2021 Women's Rugby League World Cup in England.

=== Chiefs Manawa (RU) ===
Nicholls-Pualau was signed by Chiefs Manawa for the 2023 Super Rugby Aupiki season. She rejoined the side for the 2024 season.

=== Canberra Raiders ===
On 27 Apr 2023 it was reported that she had returned to play rugby league with Canberra Raiders Women in their inaugural season.
