= Felila Kia =

Australian rugby league player

Personal information
- Born: 29 December 2003 (age 22) Brisbane, Queensland, Australia
- Height: 173 cm (5 ft 8 in)
- Weight: 90 kg (14 st 2 lb)

Playing information
- Position: Second-row, Centre
Club
Years	Team	Pld	T	G	FG	P
2023	Newcastle Knights	3	0	0	0	0
2025–	New Zealand Warriors	1	0	0	0	0
	Total	4	0	0	0	0
- Source: As of 11 May 2026

Felila Kia (born 29 December 2003) is an Australian professional rugby league footballer. She plays for the New Zealand Warriors in the NRL Women's Premiership. Her positions are second-row and centre.

== Background ==
Born in Brisbane, Queensland, Kia played her junior rugby league for the Wynnum Manly Seagulls. She is a former Queensland and Australian champion discus thrower, where she was ranked number one in the world at the age of 16.

== Playing career ==
=== 2022 ===
In 2022, Kia played for the Wynnum Manly Seagulls in the QRL Women's Premiership. She also gained selection for the women's Queensland under-19s State of Origin squad.

=== 2023 ===
In May, she signed a 2-year contract with the Newcastle Knights. In round 4 of the 2023 NRLW season, she made her NRLW debut for the Knights against the Gold Coast Titans. She parted ways with the club at the end of the season.

=== 2024 ===
On 21 December 2024 it was reported that she had signed for New Zealand Warriors to play in the NRLW
