= Annetta Nu'uausala =

New Zealand & Samoa international rugby league footballer

Personal information
- Full name: Annetta-Claudia Nu'uausala
- Born: 22 January 1995 (age 31) Auckland, New Zealand
- Height: 175 cm (5 ft 9 in)
- Weight: 105 kg (16 st 7 lb)

Playing information
- Position: Prop
Club
Years	Team	Pld	T	G	FG	P
2018–19	New Zealand Warriors	4	1	0	0	4
2021	Newcastle Knights	5	1	0	0	4
2022–25	Brisbane Broncos	25	3	0	0	12
2026–	New Zealand Warriors	9	0	0	0	0
	Total	43	5	0	0	20
Representative
Years	Team	Pld	T	G	FG	P
2016–22	New Zealand	12	3	0	0	12
2023–26	Samoa	9	3	0	0	12
- Source: RLP As of 7 November 2026
- Relatives: Frank-Paul Nu'uausala (brother)

Annetta-Claudia Nu'uausala (born 22 January 1995) is a New Zealand rugby league footballer who plays for the New Zealand Warriors in the NRL Women's Premiership.

Primarily a prop, she is both a New Zealand & Samoa representative. She previously played for the New Zealand Warriors and Newcastle Knights.

== Background ==
Born in Auckland. Nu'uausala is number 13 of 15 children. Her older brother, Frank-Paul, is a former New Zealand rugby league representative. She began playing rugby league as a teenager for McAuley High School and played her junior rugby league for the Otara Scorpions.

== Playing career ==
Nu'uasala played for Otara, Mangere East Hawks, Marist Saints and the Richmond Roses in the Auckland Rugby League.

=== 2016 ===
On 6 May 2016, Nu'uausala mader her Test debut for New Zealand, starting at second-row in a 26–16 win over Australia.

=== 2017 ===
In 2017, she represented New Zealand at the 2017 Women's Rugby League World Cup.

=== 2018 ===
On 1 August 2018, she was announced as a member of the New Zealand Warriors NRL Women's Premiership squad. In Round 1 of the 2018 NRL Women's season, she made her debut for the Warriors in a 10–4 win over the Sydney Roosters. She injured her leg during the match, ruling her out for the rest of the season.

=== 2019 ===
In Round 3 of the 2019 NRL Women's season, she scored her first try for the Warriors in a 10–8 win over the Brisbane Broncos.

=== 2021 ===
On 1 December 2021, Nu'uausala signed with the Newcastle Knights to be a part of their inaugural NRLW squad.

In Round 1 of the delayed 2021 NRL Women's season, Nu'uausala made her club debut for the Knights against the Parramatta Eels.

Nu'uausala played in all 5 matches for the Knights during the 2021 NRLW season and won the Knights' inaugural NRLW Player of the Year award.

=== 2022 ===
In early June 2022, the Brisbane Broncos announced that they had signed Nu'uausala to play for the club in the 2022 NRL Women's season.

In October 2022, she was selected for the New Zealand squad at the delayed 2021 Women's Rugby League World Cup in England.

=== 2025 ===
On 10 October 2025 it was reported that she had signed for New Zealand Warriors in the NRL Women's Premiership on a 3-year deal.
