= Emmanita Paki =

Tonga international rugby league player

Personal information
- Born: 2 January 2003 (age 23) Mildura, Victoria, Australia
- Height: 172 cm (5 ft 8 in)
- Weight: 68 kg (10 st 10 lb)

Playing information
- Position: Centre, Wing, Five-eighth, Halfback
Club
Years	Team	Pld	T	G	FG	P
2022	Newcastle Knights	4	2	0	0	8
2025–	New Zealand Warriors	19	3	0	0	12
	Total	23	5	0	0	20
Representative
Years	Team	Pld	T	G	FG	P
2024	Queensland	2	0	0	0	0
2024	Tonga	1	1	2	0	8
- Source: As of 16 November 2026

Emmanita Paki (born 2 January 2003) is a professional rugby league footballer. Her positions are centre and wing. She previously played for the Newcastle Knights in the NRL Women's Premiership. Born in Australia, she is a Tongan international.

== Background ==
Paki is of Tongan heritage and is one of four children.

Although born in Mildura, Victoria, Paki grew up in Emerald, Queensland where she attended Marist College and achieved considerable success playing touch football and netball. In touch, she represented the Junior Cowboys, Junior Titans and Central Queensland Bulls sides.

Paki completed her schooling at The Cathedral College in Rockhampton where she began playing rugby league, representing the school in the Karyn Murphy Cup.

Paki credits Tamika Upton, whose mother was Paki's touch football and netball coach, with helping with the decision to transition to rugby league. Paki has also said she looks up to Will Hopoate and is also inspired by her mother who became an amputee at the age of three when she lost her left arm in an accident.

== Playing career ==
=== Early years ===
In 2020, Paki joined the Yeppoon Seagulls. In 2021, while playing club football with Yeppoon, she also began playing for the Central Queensland Capras women's team in the BHP Premiership. On 25 June 2021, she represented the Queensland Maroons under-19s team in the "curtain raiser" held prior to the 2021 Women's State of Origin which was played on the Sunshine Coast.

=== 2022 ===
The following year, Paki continued playing with the Capras in the state competition, which became known as the BMD Premiership. The team progressed to the 2022 Grand Final where they were defeated by the North Queensland Gold Stars. Despite the loss, Paki delivered a commendable performance scoring a try in the 42nd minute, putting the team in front for the first time during the game.

On 9 June, Paki signed with the Newcastle Knights in the NRL Women's Premiership for the 2022 season. Later on, she represented the Queensland Maroons under-19s team for a second time.

After being brought into the side to replace Bobbi Law in the centres, Paki made her NRLW debut in the 2022 NRLW season on 11 September 2022, in the Knights' round 4 clash against the Sydney Roosters at Allianz Stadium in Sydney, the Knights losing 16–18.

Her second NRLW appearance came a week later in the round 5 game against the St. George Illawarra Dragons on 18 September 2022 at Central Coast Stadium in Gosford, where she played on the wing instead of her usual centre position. Paki scored the first try of the second half.

On 2 October, Paki played in the Knights' NRLW Grand Final win over the Parramatta Eels, scoring a try in the Knights' 32–12 victory.

Paki and the Knights parted ways after 2022.

=== 2024 ===
In June 2024, Paki was called-up to play for Queensland in the 2024 Women's State of Origin series.
