= Ebony Raftstrand-Smith =

New Zealand rugby league footballer (born 2005)

Personal information
- Born: 30 August 2005 (age 21) Auckland, New Zealand
- Height: 167 cm (5 ft 6 in)
- Weight: 75 kg (11 st 11 lb)

Playing information
- Position: Wing
Club
| Years | Team | Pld | T | G | FG | P |
|---|---|---|---|---|---|---|
| 2024– | Nth Qld Cowboys | 3 | 0 | 0 | 0 | 0 |
- Source: As of 13 September 2025
- Relatives: Tiana Raftstrand-Smith (sister); Portia Woodman (aunt)

Ebony Raftstrand-Smith (born 30 August 2005) is a professional rugby league footballer who currently plays for the North Queensland Cowboys in the NRL Women's Premiership.

== Background ==
Raftstrand-Smith was born in Auckland and is of Māori and Norwegian descent. She was raised on the Gold Coast, Queensland, where she played her junior rugby league for the Parkwood Sharks and Coomera Cutters, and attended Keebra Park State High School.

Her older sister, Tiana Raftstrand-Smith, also plays for the Cowboys, and her aunt, Portia Woodman, is a New Zealand rugby sevens and rugby union international.

== Playing career ==
=== Early years ===
In 2021 and 2022, Raftstrand-Smith represented Queensland City under-17, scoring two tries in two games.

In 2022, she played for the Burleigh Bears in the QRL's under-19 women's competition. In October 2022, she played for the inaugural Australian Schoolgirls team on their tour of Fiji.

=== 2023 ===
Raftstrand-Smith began the 2023 season playing for the Canterbury-Bankstown Bulldogs in the Tarsha Gale Cup.

On 20 May, she signed with the North Queensland Cowboys, alongside her older sister Tiana, on a two-year contract. In July, she represented Queensland under-19 in their win over New South Wales, and was selected to represent the Australian Schoolgirls for the second time.

=== 2024 ===
Raftstrand-Smith played for the Townsville Blackhawks in the QRL under-19s competition before moving up to the Mackay Cutters QRLW side.

On 25 May, she started on the wing in the Cutters' Grand Final win over the Norths Devils. On 20 June, she started on the wing for Queensland under-19, scoring a try in their loss to New South Wales.

In Round 2 of the 2024 NRL Women's season, she made her NRLW debut, starting on the wing against the St George Illawarra Dragons. Playing alongside her sister Tiana, they became the first pair of sisters to represent the club.

On 9 November, she re-signed with the Cowboys until the end of the 2027 season.
