= Tafao Asaua =

Samoa international rugby league footballer

Personal information
- Full name: Tafao Fa'aeaina Asaua
- Born: 2004 (age 21–22) Auckland, New Zealand
- Height: 189 cm (6 ft 2 in)
- Weight: 116 kg (18 st 4 lb)

Playing information
- Position: Prop
Club
| Years | Team | Pld | T | G | FG | P |
|---|---|---|---|---|---|---|
| 2024 | Parramatta Eels | 2 | 0 | 0 | 0 | 0 |
| 2025– | Nth Qld Cowboys | 6 | 0 | 0 | 0 | 0 |
| | Total | 8 | 0 | 0 | 0 | 0 |
Representative
| Years | Team | Pld | T | G | FG | P |
| 2023 | Samoa | 1 | 0 | 0 | 0 | 0 |
- Source: As of 1 November 2026

Tafao Fa'aeaina Asaua (born 2004) is a New Zealand professional rugby league footballer who currently plays for the North Queensland Cowboys in the NRL Women's Premiership.

A Samoan international, she previously played for the Parramatta Eels.

== Background ==
Asaua played her junior rugby league for Otahuhu, where she was selected to represent the Counties Manukau Stingrays and the New Zealand 18s team in 2022.

== Playing career ==
=== Early years ===
In 2023, Asaua moved to Australia, joining the Manly Sea Eagles, playing for their under-19 Tarsha Gale Cup team. In May 2023, she was selected to represent the under-19 New South Wales City team.

On 15 October 2023, Asaua made her Test debut for Samoa, coming off the bench in their 26–12 win over Fiji.

=== 2024 ===
Asaua joined the Parramatta Eels Top 24 squad in 2024 after being a development player for the club in 2023.

She began the season playing for the Eels' NSWRL Women's Premiership team.

In Round 4 of the 2024 NRL Women's season, she made her debut for the Eels, coming off the bench in a 12–10 win over the Wests Tigers. She played one more game for the club before departing at the end of the season.

=== 2025 ===
On 12 May, Asaua was announced as a development player for the North Queensland Cowboys. On 18 June, she was upgraded to the club's top 24 squad.

In Round 7 of the 2025 NRL Women's season, she made her debut for the Cowboys in their 22–6 win over the Bulldogs.
