= Ivana Lauitiiti =

NZ international rugby league footballer (born 2006)

Personal information
- Born: 2 August 2006 (age 20) Leeds, England
- Height: 182 cm (6 ft 0 in)
- Weight: 105 kg (16 st 7 lb)

Playing information
- Position: Prop
Club
| Years | Team | Pld | T | G | FG | P |
|---|---|---|---|---|---|---|
| 2025– | New Zealand Warriors | 13 | 4 | 0 | 0 | 16 |
Representative
| Years | Team | Pld | T | G | FG | P |
| 2025– | New Zealand | 8 | 0 | 0 | 0 | 0 |
- Source: As of 15 November 2026
- Father: Ali Lauiti'iti

Ivana Lauitiiti (born 2 August 2006) is a rugby league footballer who plays as a prop for the New Zealand Warriors Women.

== Background ==
She was born in Leeds, West Yorkshire, England, while her father Ali, a professional rugby league player, was playing for the Leeds Rhinos in the Super League. She later grew up in Auckland, New Zealand.

== Career ==
She played junior rugby for the Otahuhu Leopards. Shortly after her nineteenth birthday in August 2025, she made a try scoring debut in the NRL Women's Premiership for the New Zealand Warriors Women in an 12-6 win against North Queensland Cowboys Women In Newcastle. She and her father became the first father and daughter pairing to score tries on debut in the NRL and NRLW.
