= Patricia Maliepo =

NZ international rugby union & league player

- Born: 13 March 2003 (age 23) Auckland, New Zealand
- Height: 1.75 m (5 ft 9 in)
- Weight: 82 kg (12 st 13 lb)
- Notable relative: Moa Mua Maliepo (brother)

Rugby union career
- Position: First-five-eighth
Provincial / State sides
Years	Team	Apps	(Points)
2019–2023	Auckland	26	(174)
Super Rugby
Years	Team	Apps	(Points)
2021–24	Blues Women	20	(33)
International career
Years	Team	Apps	(Points)
2021–24	New Zealand	10	(17)
- Rugby league career

Playing information
- Position: Five-eighth
Club
Years	Team	Pld	T	G	FG	P
2025–	NZ Warriors	20	7	30	0	88
Representative
Years	Team	Pld	T	G	FG	P
2025–	New Zealand	1	0	3	0	6
- As of 18 November 2026

Patricia Maliepo (born 13 March 2003) is a New Zealand rugby union and rugby league player. She currently plays as a five-eighth for NZ Warriors in the NRLW. She was formerly a first five-eighth for Auckland and New Zealand.

== Rugby career ==
Maliepo debuted for Auckland in the Farah Palmer Cup as a 16-year-old in 2019. She impressed for the New Zealand Barbarians in 2020 against the Black Ferns. In 2021 she was named in the Blues women's squad for their historic Super Rugby match. She later made her Black Ferns debut off the bench when they played England in Exeter and appeared in three of four test matches against England and France.

Maliepo played for the Blues against the Chiefs in the first-ever women's Super Rugby match in New Zealand on 1 May 2021. On 3 November 2021, She was named in the Blues squad for the inaugural Super Rugby Aupiki competition.

Maliepo was named in the Blues starting line up for their first game, she scored a try against Matatū in their 21–10 victory. She also started in their 0–35 thrashing by the Chiefs Manawa in the final round.

Maliepo was initially named in the Black Ferns squad for the 2022 Pacific Four Series but was ruled out due to concussion.

=== NZ Warriors ===
She made her debut for NZ Warriors in July 2025

== Personal life ==
Maliepo's brother, Moa, plays internationally for Romania.
