= Shakira Baker =

New Zealand international rugby union & league player (born 1992)

- Born: 4 January 1992 (age 34) Masterton, New Zealand
- Height: 1.72 m (5 ft 8 in)
- Weight: 92 kg (14 st 7 lb)

Rugby union career
- Position(s): Wing, Fullback
Provincial / State sides
Years	Team	Apps	(Points)
2009–24	Wellington	4	(20)
Super Rugby
Years	Team	Apps	(Points)
2023–24	Hurricanes Poua	12	(10)
International career
Years	Team	Apps	(Points)
2011–14	New Zealand	13	(40)
National sevens team
Years	Team		Comps
2011–24	New Zealand		
- Rugby league career

Playing information
- Position: Second-row, Centre
Club
Years	Team	Pld	T	G	FG	P
2025–	New Zealand Warriors	19	1	0	0	4
Representative
Years	Team	Pld	T	G	FG	P
2025–	New Zealand	1	0	0	0	0
- As of 18 November 2026
Medal record
Women's rugby sevens
Representing New Zealand
Olympic Games
Silver medal – second place	2016 Rio de Janeiro	Team competition
Commonwealth Games
Gold medal – first place	2018 Gold Coast	Team competition
Rugby World Cup Sevens
Gold medal – first place	2018 San Francisco	Team competition

Shakira Baker (born 4 January 1992) is a New Zealand rugby union and rugby league player. She has represented New Zealand in both the fifteens and sevens rugby, plus rugby league.

== Rugby career ==
=== 2011 ===
Baker made her provincial debut at 16 for Wellington before making her test debut for the Black Ferns in 2011 against England.

=== 2012 ===
Baker was one of the 800 young women who attended the “Gold for Gold” Sevens trials in 2012 organized to identify talent with the potential to represent New Zealand in the Sevens competition at the Rio Olympics. At the trial she attended she was put through various fitness, rugby skills and character assessment activities. She was one of the most promising 30 who then attended a camp at Waiouru. This led to Baker playing both for the Sevens team as well as the Fifteen a side Black Ferns.

=== 2013 ===
In 2013 during a routine medical exam an electrocardiogram led to the discovery that she had a rare disorder of the heart's electrical system called Long QT syndrome which can lead to dangerous heart rhythms, fainting and sudden cardiac arrest. In her case it can be triggered by physical activity. She was treated first with a sympathectomy, where the nerve that controls the heart rate was burned in order to prevent it going over a certain rate, before key-hole surgery was used to cut the nerve supply to her heart. As a result, she missed most of the 2013 rugby season. Despite the success of the treatment it is necessary to have a defibrillator close by whenever she plays. Her first game back for the Sevens was at Dubai at the end of 2013.

=== 2014–23 ===
Baker then ruptured her anterior cruciate ligament (ACL) early in 2014 from which she recovered in time to be named in the Black Ferns squad to the 2014 Women's Rugby World Cup.

Baker was selected for the New Zealand women's sevens team to the 2016 Summer Olympics. In 2022, she was named as a non-travelling reserve for the Black Ferns Sevens squad to the Commonwealth Games in Birmingham.

In December 2022, She was confirmed as one of three final signings for Hurricanes Poua for the 2023 Super Rugby Aupiki season.

=== 2024 ===
On 20 September 2024 it was reported that she had signed for the New Zealand Warriors to play in the NRLW

== Personal life ==
Of Māori descent, Baker affiliates to the Ngāti Kahungunu iwi.

She has a science degree, majoring in marine biology, from Victoria University.

Due to her ACL injury in 2014 she was taken off contract while she recovered. This gave her the opportunity to train as a high school teacher, specializing in mathematics which she used subsequently used to obtain a position teaching at Hamilton Girls’ High School for two years. Among the students in her Year 10 mathematics class during her first year teaching was future New Zealand sevens player Jazmin Hotham.

Baker is related to New Zealand Sevens star Gilles Kaka.
