= Tysha Ikenasio =

NZ international rugby sevens & league player (born 1997)

- Born: 13 September 1997 (age 29) Auckland, New Zealand
- Height: 1.65 m (5 ft 5 in)
- Weight: 70 kg (11 st 0 lb)

Rugby union career
National sevens team
Years	Team	Comps
2022–24	New Zealand	19
- Rugby league career

Playing information
- Position: Centre
Club
Years	Team	Pld	T	G	FG	P
2025–	New Zealand Warriors	18	10	0	0	40
Representative
Years	Team	Pld	T	G	FG	P
2025–	New Zealand	2	1	0	0	4
- As of 13 November 2026
Medal record
Women's rugby sevens
Representing New Zealand
Olympic Games
Gold medal – first place	2024 Paris	Team competition

Tysha Ikenasio (born 13 September 1997) is a New Zealand rugby sevens and rugby league player. She has also represented New Zealand in tag and touch rugby.

== Early life ==
Tysha Ikenasio was born on 13 September 1997 in Auckland. She attended Sancta Maria College in Auckland and played netball and touch rugby representatively. She competed for New Zealand at the 2015 Touch World Cup in Australia. It was while in Year 12 at the college that she played her first sevens rugby when the school established their first girls sevens team in 2014. Prior to finishing her education in 2015 she was twice co-winner of the Middle School Sportswoman of the Year and twice Senior School Sportswoman of the Year.

== Career ==
Ikenasio played sevens professionally in Japan for five years, she played for the Tokyo Phoenix for two years before moving to the Nagato Blue Angels.

The onset of the Covid-19 pandemic brought an end to the Japanese competition and so Ikenasio returned to New Zealand. With little opportunities to play rugby, she played rugby league for a season with the Richmond Roses in the Auckland premiership.

The only chance to play sevens rugby during this period was when she was asked by co-coach Rocky Khan to play for Moana Pasifika in the 2021 Takiwhitu Tuturu Sevens in Wellington.

=== New Zealand sevens ===
In 2022 while working full time as a personal trainer she was approached by Cory Sweeney and as a result obtained a position on the Black Ferns Sevens Development Team. She played for the Black Ferns Pango team at the 2022 Oceania Sevens at Pukekohe. She was named as a non-travelling reserve for the Black Ferns Sevens squad for the 2022 Commonwealth Games in Birmingham.

=== 2023 Premier Rugby Sevens ===
In May 2023, Ikenasio revealed she was going to play Premier Rugby Sevens in the United States during the New Zealand sevens off-season. Ikenasio signed with the Texas Team, suiting up alongside Black Ferns teammate, Alena Saili.

Ikenasio ended the year totaling, 15 carries, 10 points, nine tackles, two tries, and two steals. Team went 1-3 throughout the season picking up their lone win at Highmark Stadium in Pittsburgh, Pa. against the Pittsburgh Steeltoes. Texas dominated Pittsburgh, shutting them out 29-0.

Ikenasio tallied one try in the Eastern Conference Kickoff at Q2 Stadium in Austin, Tx. At this event, the Team went 0-2 falling to the New York Locals and the Steeltoes.

She scored her second try at the Eastern Conference Finals in Pittsburgh where the squad went 1-1, falling to the Southern Headliners by one point and topping the Steeltoes.

=== 2023-24 ===
She retained her contact with the Zealand Black Ferns Sevens though the 2023-2024 season. She was a travelling reserve for the New Zealand Women's Rugby Sevens team that won the gold medal in the rugby sevens competition at the Paris Olympics

=== Move to the Warriors ===
In December 2024 Ikenasio signed a three year contract to play rugby league in the NRLW for the New Zealand Warriors team commencing in 2025.
