= Harata Butler =

New Zealand international rugby league footballer (born 1993)

Personal information
- Born: 28 June 1993 (age 33) Kawakawa, New Zealand
- Height: 173 cm (5 ft 8 in)
- Weight: 97 kg (15 st 4 lb)

Playing information
- Position: Prop
Club
Years	Team	Pld	T	G	FG	P
2023	Cronulla Sharks	8	0	0	0	0
2024	Nth Qld Cowboys	4	0	0	0	0
2025–	New Zealand Warriors	11	0	0	0	0
	Total	23	0	0	0	0
Representative
Years	Team	Pld	T	G	FG	P
2014	New South Wales	1	0	0	0	0
2019–23	Māori All Stars	3	0	0	0	0
2020	New Zealand	1	0	0	0	0
- Source: As of 11 September 2026
- Relatives: Rima Butler (cousin), Teina Clark (cousin)

Harata Butler (born 28 June 1993) is a professional rugby league footballer who currently plays for the New Zealand Warriors in the NRL Women's Premiership.

A prop, she previously played for the Cronulla Sharks and North Queensland Cowboys.

== Background ==
Butler was raised in Huntly, New Zealand, where she attended Te Wharekura o Rakaumangamanga and played her junior rugby league for Taniwharau.

== Playing career ==
=== Early years ===
In 2013 she moved to Australia and began playing for the Canley Heights Dragons in the Sydney Metropolitan Women's Premiership, winning premierships in 2013 and 2014. In 2014, she represented New South Wales in the Interstate Challenge, starting at centre in a loss to Queensland.

In 2016 after a year off due to the birth of her son, Butler returned to New Zealand and played for the Papakura Sea Eagles in Auckland. That year she represented the Counties Manukau Stingrays against the Akarana Falcons in a curtain-raiser to the New Zealand Warriors' Round 21 NRL game.

In 2019 Butler represented the Māori All Stars for the first time, coming off the bench in their 8–4 win over the Indigenous All Stars.

In 2020 Butler played for the New Zealand Warriors in the NRL Nines. In November 2020, she made her Test debut for New Zealand, starting at prop in their win over Samoa.

=== 2023 ===
In 2023 Butler returned to Australia, joining the South Sydney Rabbitohs in the Harvey Norman Women's Premiership.

On 23 May, she signed a one-year contract with the Cronulla Sharks. In Round 1 of the 2023 NRL Women's season, she made her NRLW debut for the Sharks, starting at prop and scoring a try in a 28–14 to the Canberra Raiders.

=== 2024 ===
On 18 January, Butler joined the North Queensland Cowboys, signing until the end of the 2025 season. Prior to the NRLW season, she played for the Brisbane Tigers in the QRL Women's Premiership.

In Round 1 of the 2024 NRL Women's season, Butler made her debut for the Cowboys, coming off the bench in their 14–0 loss to Cronulla.

On 12 September, Butler signed with the New Zealand Warriors on a two-year contract.
