= New Zealand Warriors Women =

Professional rugby league football club

New Zealand Warriors
Club information
- Full name: New Zealand Warriors Rugby League Football Club
- Nickname(s): The Warriors, The Wahs
- Colours: Blue; Green; Red; White
- Founded: Club: 1995 as Auckland Warriors
- Website: warriors.kiwi

Current details
- Ground: Mount Smart Stadium, Auckland (25,000)
- CEO: Tom Gannan
- Chairman: Ken Reinsfield
- Coach: Ronald Griffiths
- Captain: Apii Nicholls
- Competition: NRL Women's Premiership

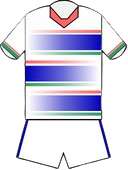
| Home colours | Away colours |
- Current season

Records
- Premierships: 0
- Biggest win: Warriors 44 – 6 Tigers; Campbelltown Stadium (14 Sep 2025)
- Biggest loss: Warriors 8 – 66 Roosters; Allianz Stadium (23 Aug 2026)
- First game: Warriors 10 – 4 Roosters; ANZ Stadium (8 Sep 2018)
- Most recent game: Warriors 18 – 52 Broncos; Totally Workwear Stadium (13 Sep 2026)
- Wooden spoons: 0
- Most capped: 24 – Apii Nicholls
- Highest try scorer: 18 – Payton Takimoana
- Highest points scorer: 88 – Patricia Maliepo

The New Zealand Warriors Women are a professional rugby league football club based in Auckland, New Zealand that competes in the National Rugby League Women's (NRLW) premiership. They are coached by Ronald Griffiths. As with the men's team, the Warriors women are based at Mount Smart Stadium in the Auckland suburb of Penrose. The Warriors women's team previously competed in the NRLW for three seasons: 2018, 2019, and 2020.

== History ==
In December 2017, the New Zealand Warriors expressed their interest in applying for a licence to participate in the inaugural NRL Women's Premiership. In March 2018, they were awarded one of four licences for the league's inaugural season, to commence in September of the same year. Luisa Avaiki was named the coach of the side.

The team competed in, and finished 3rd place in both the 2018 and 2019 seasons, the latter of which included the first ever standalone NRLW match held at Mount Smart Stadium.

The team was impacted in 2020 by travel restrictions imposed to mitigate the COVID-19 pandemic. Five New Zealand based players from the previous season elected to go through three weeks of quarantine isolation on arrival in Australia to prepare for the 2020 NRLW season. The remainder of the Warriors squad consisted of Australian based players. The team was coached by Jillaroos coach, Brad Donald. The side came in third place (from four) for the third consecutive year.

In June 2021, CEO Cameron George announced the team would not compete in the 2021 competition but plan to re-enter the competition in 2022. This did not eventuate, however, with the NRL announcing NRLW expansion to 10 teams for the 2023 season that did not include the Warriors.

In August 2022, during a members-only meeting with CEO Cameron George, Owner Mark Robinson, Coach Stacey Jones, and Captain Tohu Harris. It was announced their intention to re-enter the competition for the 2025 season. On March 28 2024, NRL CEO Andrew Abdo announced the Warriors would rejoin the NRLW, along with a Canterbury-Bankstown Bulldogs team, in an expanded 12-team competition from 2025.

In December 2025, the Warriors announced a pathways partnership with the South Sydney Rabbitohs for the 2026 NRLW season. Under the agreement, Warriors contracted players not required for the NRLW team on a particular weekend will be available to play for the Rabbitohs in the NSWRL Women's Premiership. South Sydney contracted players will have the opportunity to trial for the Warriors and to be brought into the squad and NRLW team as injury replacements.

== Coaches ==
On 1 July 2024, the club announced the appointment of Ronald Griffiths as head coach of their NRLW team, for their return to the competition in 2025. Griffiths was appointed on a three-year deal.
As of 7 September 2026

| Coach | Season span | M | W | D | L | For | Agst | Win % | Share % | Ref |
|---|---|---|---|---|---|---|---|---|---|---|
| Luisa Avaiki | 2018–2019 | 6 | 3 | 0 | 3 | 56 | 104 | 50.00% | 35.00% | |
| Brad Donald | 2020 | 3 | 1 | 0 | 2 | 48 | 60 | 33.33% | 44.44% | |
| Ronald Griffiths | 2025–present | 22 | 8 | 0 | 14 | 434 | 508 | 36.36% | 46.07% | |

== Captains ==
All players who have captained the New Zealand Warriors Women's team in NRLW matches.
As of 15 September 2026

| C# | Name | Years as Captain | Debut | | Games as Captain | | | Games for Club | Ref |
| C# | Name | Years as Captain | Date | Round | Solo | Joint | Total | Games for Club | Ref |
|---|---|---|---|---|---|---|---|---|---|
| 1 | Laura Mariu | 2018 | 8 Sep 2018 | 1 | 3 | 0 | 3 | 3 | |
| 2 | Georgia Hale | 2019–2020 | 14 Sep 2019 | 1 | 6 | 0 | 6 | 9 | |
| 3 | Apii Nicholls | 2025–present | 6 Jul 2025 | 1 | 18 | 0 | 18 | 24 | |
| 4 | Harata Butler | 2025 | 16 Aug 2025 | 7 | 1 | 0 | 1 | 22 | |
| 5 | Kaiyah Atai | 2026 | 23 Aug 2026 | 8 | 3 | 0 | 3 | 19 | |

== Players ==
Jersey numbers in the table reflect the team list announced for Round 11.
Table last updated on 14 September 2026.

| J# | Player | Age | Position(s) | NRLW seasons | | | | NRLW stats | | | | | Origin | Tests | All Stars |
| J# | Player | Age | Position(s) | Debut | 2018-24 | 2025 | 2026 | M | T | G | Pts | Prems | Origin | Tests | All Stars |
|---|---|---|---|---|---|---|---|---|---|---|---|---|---|---|---|
| 21 | Apii Nicholls | 33 | Fullback | 2018 | 6 5 17 | 10 | 8 | 46 | 3 | 13 | 38 | — | — | 19 | — |
| 2 | Payton Takimoana | 23 | Wing, Centre | 2025 | — | 11 | 8 | 19 | 18 | 0 | 72 | — | — | — | 1 |
| 3 | Mele Hufanga | 31 | Centre | 2023 | 20 | 13 | 7 | 40 | 29 | 0 | 116 | 1 | — | 1 13 | — |
| 4 | Stacey Waaka | 30 | Centre, Wing | 2024 | 6 | U7s | 10 | 16 | 15 | 0 | 60 | — | — | — | — |
| 19 | Tysha Ikenasio | 29 | Wing, Centre | 2025 | — | 8 | 10 | 18 | 10 | 0 | 40 | — | — | 2 | — |
| 6 | Gayle Broughton | 30 | Five-eighth, Halfback | 2022 | 7 16 | 13 | 9 | 45 | 12 | 0 | 48 | 1 | — | 3 | 2 |
| 7 | Patricia Maliepo | 23 | Halfback, Hooker | 2025 | — | 9 | 11 | 20 | 7 | 30 | 88 | — | — | 2 | — |
| 8 | Annetta Nu'uausala | 31 | Prop, Second-row | 2018 | 4 5 15 | 11 | 9 | 44 | 5 | 0 | 20 | 1 | — | 14 6 | — |
| 9 | Jasmin Huriwai | 32 | Hooker, Halfback | 2026 | — | RU | 10 | 10 | 2 | 3 | 14 | — | — | — | — |
| 10 | Matekino Gray | 21 | Prop, Second-row | 2024 | 4 | 8 | 3 | 15 | 0 | 0 | 0 | — | — | — | 1 |
| 11 | Maarire Puketapu | 24 | Second-row, Lock | 2025 | — | 10 | 9 | 19 | 0 | 0 | 0 | — | — | — | — |
| 12 | Shakira Baker | 34 | Second-row, Centre | 2025 | — | 8 | 11 | 19 | 1 | 0 | 4 | — | — | 1 | 1 |
| 13 | Kaiyah Atai | 24 | Lock, Second-row | 2025 | — | 11 | 8 | 19 | 2 | 0 | 8 | — | — | 4 | — |
| 14 | Capri Paekau | 25 | Hooker | 2023 | 5 | 10 | 8 | 23 | 1 | 0 | 4 | — | — | 1 | 2 |
| 15 | Harata Butler | 33 | Prop | 2023 | 8 4 | 11 | 11 | 34 | 0 | 0 | 0 | — | 1 | 1 | 4 |
| 16 | Ashlee Matapo | 19 | Prop, Lock | 2025 | — | 8 | 7 | 15 | 0 | 0 | 0 | — | — | 2 | — |
| 17 | Metanoia Fetalaiga | 27 | Prop | 2025 | — | 5 | 9 | 14 | 1 | 0 | 4 | — | — | 1 | — |
| 18 | Mya Hill-Moana | 24 | Prop, Lock | 2021 | 25 | — | 6 | 31 | 1 | 0 | 4 | 2 | — | 10 | 5 |
| 22 | Laishon Albert-Jones | 28 | Lock, Second-row | 2023 | 20 | 9 | 1 | 30 | 5 | 0 | 20 | 1 | — | 3 | 1 |
| 1 | Anastasia Sekene | 28 | Centre, Wing | 2026 | — | — | 2 | 2 | 0 | 0 | 0 | — | — | — | — |
| 5 | Lavinia Tauhalaliku | 27 | Wing, Centre | 2025 | 4 | 3 | 4 | 11 | 11 | 0 | 44 | — | — | 1 3 | — |
| 20 | Natalia Hickling | 19 | Halfback | 2026 | — | U | 1 | 1 | 0 | 0 | 0 | — | — | — | — |
| – | Felila Kia | 22 | Prop, Second-row | 2023 | 3 | 1 | — | 4 | 0 | 0 | 0 | 1 | — | — | — |
| – | Ocean Tierney | 25 | Wing, Centre | 2026 | — | — | 3 | 3 | 3 | 0 | 12 | — | — | — | — |
| IJ | Christabelle Onesemo-Tuilaepa | 22 | Second-row, Lock | 2026 | — | — | 7 | 7 | 0 | 0 | 0 | — | — | — | — |
| IJ | Emmanita Paki | 23 | Fullback, Five-eighth | 2022 | 4 | 11 | 8 | 23 | 5 | 0 | 20 | 1 | 2 | 3 | — |
| S | Ivana Lauitiiti | 20 | Prop | 2025 | — | 6 | 7 | 13 | 4 | 0 | 16 | — | — | 3 | — |
| IS | Tyra Wetere | 20 | Wing, Halfback | 2025 | — | 6 | — | 6 | 5 | 0 | 20 | — | — | — | — |
| DV | Patricia Heihei | 18 | Lock, Five-eighth | — | — | — | — | 0 | 0 | 0 | 0 | — | — | — | — |
| DV | Gezreyal Maiu’u | 18 | Second-row, Centre | — | — | U | — | 0 | 0 | 0 | 0 | — | — | — | — |
| DV | Asha Taumoepeau-Williams | 17 | Centre, Wing | — | — | — | — | 0 | 0 | 0 | 0 | — | — | — | — |

Notes:

- Christabelle Onesemo-Tuilaepa and Anastasia Sekene have each been signed on a supplementary contact for 2026.
- The following players have been signed on a development contract for 2026:
  - Patricia Heihei
  - Gezreyal Maiu'u
  - Asha Taumoepeau-Williams
  - Ocean Tierney
- The following five players were unavailable for Round 1 due to injury or surgery recovery: Kaiyah Atai, Matekino Gray, Mele Hufanga, Anastasia Sekene, and Tyra Wetere.
- Two more players (Laishon Albert-Jones and Payton Takimoana) were added to the injury list after the first round match.
- Metanoia Fetalaiga previously played under her maiden name, Metanoia Fotu-Moala.
- The following players were signed on a development contract for 2025:
  - Ivana Lautitiiti
  - Sharnyze Pihema

The New Zealand Warriors announced contract extensions in several instalments from August 2025. The New Zealand Warriors announced player signings in several instalments from October 2025.

=== Players out ===
Off contract

- Laishon Albert-Jones
- Harata Butler
- Matekino Gray
- Jasmin Huriwai
- Felila Kia
- Patricia Maliepo
- Apii Nicholls
- Capri Paekau
- Emmanita Paki
- Payton Takimoana
- Lavinia Tauhalaliku
- Tyra Wetere
- Shakira Baker (CO)
- Metanoia Fetalaiga (CO)
- Natalia Hickling (Rpl)
- Christabelle Onesemo-Tuilaepa (Sup)
- Anastasia Sekene (Sup)
- Ocean Tierney (Dev)

==== Off contract after 2027 ====
- Kaiyah Atai
- Gayle Broughton
- Mya Hill-Moana
- Mele Hufanga
- Tysha Ikenasio
- Ivana Lauitiiti
- Ashlee Matapo
- Maarire Puketapu
- Stacey Waaka

== Seasons ==
| Season | Regular season | | | | | | | | Finals | | Nines | Ref |
| Season | P | W | D | L | F | A | Pts | Pos | Top | Placing | Nines | Ref |
|---|---|---|---|---|---|---|---|---|---|---|---|---|
| 2018 | 3 | 1 | 0 | 2 | 26 | 58 | 2 | 3rd | 2 | — | — | |
| 2019 | 3 | 2 | 0 | 1 | 30 | 46 | 4 | 3rd | 2 | — | — | |
| 2020 | 3 | 1 | 0 | 2 | 48 | 60 | 2 | 3rd | 2 | — | 4th | |
| 2025 | 11 | 4 | 0 | 7 | 194 | 198 | 8 | 8th | 6 | — | — | |
| 2026 | 11 | 4 | 0 | 7 | 240 | 310 | 8 | 7th | 6 | — | — | |

=== 2026 draw ===
The draw for the 2026 season was announced on 14 November 2025.

| Round | Opponent | Score | Date | Time | Venue | |
|---|---|---|---|---|---|---|
| 1 | Bulldogs | 32–10 | Sun 5 Jul 2026 | 1:45 PM | Home | FMG Stadium Waikato |
| 2 | Raiders | 16–42 | Sun 12 Jul 2026 | 12.00 PM | Away | GIO Stadium |
| 3 | Cowboys | 42–4 | Sat 18 Jul 2026 | 3:15 PM | Home | Go Media Stadium |
| 4 | Eels | 14–12 | Sun 26 Jul 2026 | 12:00 PM | Away | Eric Tweedale Stadium |
| 5 | Titans | 16–18 | Sun 2 Aug 2026 | 1:45 PM | Neutral | Geohex Stadium, Wagga Wagga |
| 6 | Knights | 22–14 | Sat 8 Aug 2026 | 5:15 PM | Home | FMG Stadium Waikato |
| 7 | Tigers | 22–30 | Sun 16 Aug 2026 | 1:45 PM | Away | CommBank Stadium |
| 8 | Roosters | 8–66 | Sun 23 Aug 2026 | 1:45 PM | Away | Allianz Stadium |
| 9 | Dragons | 18–22 | Sun 30 Aug 2026 | 11:50 AM | Home | Go Media Stadium |
| 10 | Sharks | 32–40 | Sat 5 Sep 2026 | 12:45 PM | Home | Go Media Stadium |
| 11 | Broncos | 18–52 | Sun 13 Sep 2026 | 12:00 PM | Away | Totally Workwear Stadium |

== Individual awards ==
The New Zealand Warriors player of the year and other club award winners between 2018 and 2020, and since 2025.

| Year | Player of the Year | Player's Player | Members' Award | Rookie | Clubwomen | Ref |
|---|---|---|---|---|---|---|
| 2018 | No awards presented | | | | | |
| 2019 | No awards presented | | | | | |
| 2020 | Evania Isa'ako | — | — | Stephanie Ball | Micheala Peck | |
| 2025 | Apii Nicholls | Kaiyah Atai | Payton Takimoana | Ivana Lauitiiti | Tysha Ikenasio | |
| 2026 | Kaiyah Atai | Stacey Waaka | Stacey Waaka | Christabelle Onesemo-Tuilaepa | Harata Butler | |

== Club records ==
Win-loss record since entering the NRLW in 2018. The team went into hiatus in 2021 due to COVID-19 restrictions. The hiatus continued through to 2024.

| Games | Wins | Drawn | Loss | Points for | Points against | +/- | Win % |
|---|---|---|---|---|---|---|---|
| 31 | 12 | 0 | 19 | 544 | 672 | –128 | 38.71% |

=== Head-to-head records ===
| Opponent | First meeting | P | W | D | L | PF | PA | Win % | Share |
|---|---|---|---|---|---|---|---|---|---|
| Roosters | 8 Sep 2018 | 5 | 2 | 0 | 3 | 52 | 134 | 40.00% | 27.96% |
| Dragons | 15 Sep 2018 | 5 | 1 | 0 | 4 | 74 | 106 | 20.00% | 41.11% |
| Broncos | 21 Sep 2018 | 5 | 1 | 0 | 4 | 58 | 146 | 20.00% | 28.43% |
| Eels | 13 Jul 2025 | 2 | 2 | 0 | 0 | 28 | 12 | 100.00% | 70.00% |
| Knights | 20 Jul 2025 | 2 | 1 | 0 | 1 | 42 | 50 | 50.00% | 45.65% |
| Titans | 26 Jul 2025 | 2 | 0 | 0 | 2 | 26 | 38 | 0.00% | 40.63% |
| Cowboys | 3 Aug 2025 | 2 | 2 | 0 | 0 | 54 | 10 | 100.00% | 84.38% |
| Bulldogs | 9 Aug 2025 | 2 | 2 | 0 | 0 | 66 | 16 | 100.00% | 80.49% |
| Raiders | 16 Aug 2025 | 2 | 0 | 0 | 2 | 32 | 62 | 0.00% | 34.04% |
| Sharks | 24 Aug 2025 | 2 | 0 | 0 | 2 | 46 | 62 | 0.00% | 42.59% |
| Tigers | 14 Sep 2025 | 2 | 1 | 0 | 1 | 66 | 36 | 50.00% | 64.71% |
| Totals | 4 Jul 2025 | 31 | 12 | 0 | 19 | 544 | 672 | 38.71% | 44.74% |

Notes

- Share % is the percentage of points For over the sum of points For and Against.
- Clubs listed in the order than the Dragons Women first played them.
- As of 15 September 2026

=== Player records ===
Lists and tables last updated: 15 September 2026.

==== Career records (at the Warriors) ====
===== Most games for the Warriors =====
Qualification: 12 games

| Rank | Player | Span | Games |
|---|---|---|---|
| 1 | Apii Nicholls | 2018–19, 2025– | 24 |
| 2 | Harata Butler | 2025– | 22 |
| 3 | Patricia Maliepo | 2025– | 20 |
| 4 | Emmanita Paki | 2025– | 19 |
| 4 | Kaiyah Atai | 2025– | 19 |
| 4 | Maarire Puketapu | 2025– | 19 |
| 4 | Payton Takimoana | 2025– | 19 |
| 4 | Shakira Baker | 2025– | 19 |
| 9 | Capri Paekau | 2025– | 18 |
| 9 | Tysha Ikenasio | 2025– | 18 |
| 11 | Ashlee Matapo | 2025– | 15 |
| 12 | Metanoia Fetalaiga | 2025– | 14 |
| 13 | Annetta Nu'uausala | 2018–19, 2026– | 13 |
| 13 | Ivana Lauitiiti | 2025– | 13 |

===== Most points for the Warriors =====
Qualification: 12 points

| Rank | Player | 2026 club | M | T | G | FG | Points |
|---|---|---|---|---|---|---|---|
| 1 | Patricia Maliepo | | 20 | 7 | 30 | 0 | 88 |
| 2 | Payton Takimoana | | 19 | 18 | 0 | 0 | 72 |
| 3 | Lavinia Tauhalaliku | | 7 | 10 | 0 | 0 | 40 |
| 3 | Tysha Ikenasio | | 18 | 10 | 0 | 0 | 40 |
| 5 | Stacey Waaka | | 10 | 9 | 0 | 0 | 36 |
| 6 | Apii Nicholls | | 24 | 2 | 13 | 0 | 34 |
| 7 | Tyra Wetere | | 6 | 5 | 0 | 0 | 20 |
| 8 | Ivana Lauitiiti | | 13 | 4 | 0 | 0 | 16 |
| 8 | Mele Hufanga | | 7 | 4 | 0 | 0 | 16 |
| 10 | Jasmin Huriwai | | 10 | 2 | 3 | 0 | 14 |
| 11 | Evania Isa'ako | | 3 | 3 | 0 | 0 | 12 |
| 11 | Kirra Dibb | | 3 | 1 | 4 | 0 | 12 |
| 11 | Emmanita Paki | | 19 | 3 | 0 | 0 | 12 |
| 11 | Gayle Broughton | | 9 | 3 | 0 | 0 | 12 |
| 11 | Ocean Tierney | | 3 | 3 | 0 | 0 | 12 |

===== Most tries for the Warriors =====
Qualification: 3 tries

| Rank | Player | Tries |
|---|---|---|
| 1 | Payton Takimoana | 18 |
| 2 | Lavinia Tauhalaliku | 10 |
| 2 | Tysha Ikenasio | 10 |
| 4 | Stacey Waaka | 9 |
| 5 | Patricia Maliepo | 7 |
| 6 | Tyra Wetere | 5 |
| 7 | Ivana Lauitiiti | 4 |
| 7 | Mele Hufanga | 4 |
| 9 | Evania Isa'ako | 3 |
| 9 | Emmanita Paki | 3 |
| 9 | Gayle Broughton | 3 |
| 9 | Ocean Tierney | 3 |

===== Most goals for the Warriors =====
All goal kickers

| Rank | Player | Goals |
|---|---|---|
| 1 | Patricia Maliepo | 30 |
| 2 | Apii Nicholls | 13 |
| 3 | Kirra Dibb | 4 |
| 4 | Jasmin Huriwai | 3 |

===== Most field goals for the Warriors =====
No instances to date

==== Season records ====
Season length has increased over time as the competition has expanded.

===== Most points in a season for the Warriors =====
Qualification: 12 points

| Rank | Player | Season | M | T | G | FG | Points |
|---|---|---|---|---|---|---|---|
| 1 | Payton Takimoana | 2025 | 11 | 15 | 0 | 0 | 60 |
| 2 | Patricia Maliepo | 2025 | 9 | 4 | 17 | 0 | 50 |
| 3 | Patricia Maliepo | 2026 | 11 | 3 | 13 | 0 | 38 |
| 4 | Lavinia Tauhalaliku | 2026 | 4 | 9 | 0 | 0 | 36 |
| 4 | Stacey Waaka | 2026 | 10 | 9 | 0 | 0 | 36 |
| 6 | Tysha Ikenasio | 2026 | 10 | 8 | 0 | 0 | 32 |
| 7 | Tyra Wetere | 2025 | 6 | 5 | 0 | 0 | 20 |
| 8 | Apii Nicholls | 2025 | 10 | 1 | 6 | 0 | 16 |
| 8 | Mele Hufanga | 2026 | 7 | 4 | 0 | 0 | 16 |
| 10 | Jasmin Huriwai | 2026 | 10 | 2 | 3 | 0 | 14 |
| 11 | Kirra Dibb | 2020 | 3 | 1 | 4 | 0 | 12 |
| 11 | Evania Pelite | 2020 | 3 | 3 | 0 | 0 | 12 |
| 11 | Emmanita Paki | 2026 | 8 | 3 | 0 | 0 | 12 |
| 11 | Payton Takimoana | 2026 | 8 | 3 | 0 | 0 | 12 |
| 11 | Ocean Tierney | 2026 | 3 | 3 | 0 | 0 | 12 |

===== Most tries in a season for the Warriors =====
Qualification: 3 tries

| Rank | Player | Season | M | Tries |
|---|---|---|---|---|
| 1 | Payton Takimoana | 2025 | 11 | 15 |
| 2 | Lavinia Tauhalaliku | 2026 | 4 | 9 |
| 2 | Stacey Waaka | 2026 | 10 | 9 |
| 4 | Tysha Ikenasio | 2026 | 10 | 8 |
| 5 | Tyra Wetere | 2025 | 6 | 5 |
| 6 | Patricia Maliepo | 2025 | 9 | 4 |
| 6 | Mele Hufanga | 2026 | 7 | 4 |
| 8 | Evania Pelite | 2020 | 3 | 3 |
| 8 | Gayle Broughton | 2026 | 9 | 3 |
| 8 | Patricia Maliepo | 2026 | 11 | 3 |
| 8 | Emmanita Paki | 2026 | 8 | 3 |
| 8 | Payton Takimoana | 2026 | 8 | 3 |
| 8 | Ocean Tierney | 2026 | 3 | 3 |

==== Match records ====
===== Most points in a game for the Warriors =====
Qualification: 12 points

| Rank | Player | Date | Opponent | Venue | T | G | FG | Points |
|---|---|---|---|---|---|---|---|---|
| 1 | Patricia Maliepo | 9 Aug 2025 | Bulldogs | Accor Stadium | 2 | 5 | 0 | 18 |
| 2 | Apii Nicholls | 14 Sep 2025 | Tigers | Campbelltown Sports Stadium | 1 | 6 | 0 | 16 |
| 2 | Lavinia Tauhalaliku | 18 Jul 2026 | Cowboys | Go Media Stadium | 4 | 0 | 0 | 16 |
| 4 | Payton Takimoana | 20 Jul 2025 | Knights | McDonald Jones Stadium | 3 | 0 | 0 | 12 |
| 4 | Payton Takimoana | 16 Aug 2025 | Raiders | FMG Stadium Waikato | 3 | 0 | 0 | 12 |
| 4 | Tysha Ikenasio | 8 Aug 2026 | Knights | FMG Stadium Waikato | 3 | 0 | 0 | 12 |

===== Most tries in a game for the Warriors =====
Qualification: 2 tries

| Rank | Player | Date | Opponent | Venue | Tries |
|---|---|---|---|---|---|
| 1 | Lavinia Tauhalaliku | 18 Jul 2026 | Cowboys | Go Media Stadium | 4 |
| 2 | Payton Takimoana | 20 Jul 2025 | Knights | McDonald Jones Stadium | 3 |
| 3 | Payton Takimoana | 16 Aug 2025 | Raiders | FMG Stadium Waikato | 3 |
| 3 | Tysha Ikenasio | 8 Aug 2026 | Knights | FMG Stadium Waikato | 3 |
| 5 | Shaniah Power | 17 Oct 2020 | Dragons | ANZ Stadium | 2 |
| 5 | Patricia Maliepo | 9 Aug 2025 | Bulldogs | Accor Stadium | 2 |
| 5 | Tyra Watere | 9 Aug 2025 | Bulldogs | Accor Stadium | 2 |
| 5 | Tyra Watere | 24 Aug 2025 | Sharks | FMG Stadium Waikato | 2 |
| 5 | Payton Takimoana | 30 Aug 2025 | Dragons | Jubilee Stadium | 2 |
| 5 | Laishon Albert-Jones | 14 Sep 2025 | Tigers | Campbelltown Sports Stadium | 2 |
| 5 | Payton Takimoana | 14 Sep 2025 | Tigers | Campbelltown Sports Stadium | 2 |
| 5 | Emmanita Paki | 5 Jul 2025 | Bulldogs | FMG Stadium Waikato | 2 |
| 5 | Lavinia Tauhalaliku | 5 Jul 2025 | Bulldogs | FMG Stadium Waikato | 2 |
| 5 | Stacey Waaka | 18 Jul 2026 | Cowboys | Go Media Stadium | 2 |
| 5 | Tysha Ikenasio | 16 Aug 2026 | Tigers | CommBank Stadium | 2 |
| 5 | Lavinia Tauhalaliku | 30 Aug 2026 | Dragons | Go Media Stadium | 2 |
| 5 | Payton Takimoana | 5 Sep 2026 | Sharks | Go Media Stadium | 2 |

===== Most goals in a game for the Warriors =====
Qualification: 3 goals

| Rank | Player | Date | Opponent | Venue | Goals |
|---|---|---|---|---|---|
| 1 | Apii Nicholls | 14 Sep 2025 | Bulldogs | Campbelltown Sports Stadium | 6 |
| 2 | Patricia Maliepo | 9 Aug 2025 | Bulldogs | Accor Stadium | 5 |
| 3 | Patricia Maliepo | 30 Aug 2025 | Dragons | Jubilee Stadium | 3 |
| 3 | Patricia Maliepo | 18 Jul 2026 | Cowboys | Go Media Stadium | 3 |

==== Oldest and youngest players ====
The oldest and youngest players to represent the New Zealand Warriors women in the NRLW.

| Name | Age | Year |
|---|---|---|
| Lorina Papali'i | 41 and 248 days | 2018 |
| Ashlee Matapo | 18 and 289 days | 2025 |

==== First try and last try ====
Player who scored the first try and most recent try for the Warriors.

| Name | Year | Round | Minute | Opponent |
|---|---|---|---|---|
| Hilda Mariu | 2018 | 1 | 8' | Roosters |
| Jasmin Huriwai | 2026 | 11 | 64' | Broncos |

=== Margins and streaks ===
Biggest winning margins
Qualification: 10 point margin

| Margin | Score | Opponent | Venue | Date | Round |
|---|---|---|---|---|---|
| 38 | 44–6 | Tigers | Campbelltown Stadium | 14 Sep 2025 | 11 |
| 38 | 42–4 | Cowboys | Go Media Stadium | 18 Jul 2026 | 3 |
| 28 | 34–6 | Bulldogs | Accor Stadium | 9 Aug 2025 | 6 |
| 22 | 32–10 | Bulldogs | FMG Stadium Waikato | 5 Jul 2026 | 1 |
| 14 | 14–0 | Eels | Go Media Stadium | 13 Jul 2025 | 2 |
| 12 | 22–10 | Dragons | ANZ Stadium | 17 Oct 2020 | 3 |

Biggest losing margins
Qualification: 10 point margin

| Margin | Score | Opponent | Venue | Date | Round |
|---|---|---|---|---|---|
| 58 | 8—66 | Roosters | Allianz Stadium | 23 Aug 2026 | 8 |
| 34 | 18 — 52 | Broncos | Totally Workwear Stadium | 13 Sep 2026 | 11 |
| 26 | 16—42 | Raiders | GIO Stadium | 12 Jul 2026 | 2 |
| 24 | 6—30 | Roosters | Allianz Stadium | 6 Jul 2025 | 1 |
| 22 | 10—32 | Broncos | AAMI Park | 21 Sep 2018 | 3 |
| 20 | 6—26 | Dragons | Mount Smart Stadium | 22 Se 2019 | 2 |
| 20 | 6—26 | Broncos | FMG Stadium Waikato | 7 Sep 2025 | 10 |
| 16 | 20—36 | Knights | McDonald Jones Stadium | 20 Jul 2025 | 3 |
| 14 | 14—28 | Broncos | GIO Stadium | 3 Oct 2020 | 1 |
| 12 | 10—22 | Dragons | ANZ Stadium | 15 Sep 2018 | 2 |
| 10 | 12—22 | Roosters | Bankwest Stadium | 10 Oct 2020 | 2 |
| 10 | 10—20 | Titans | Go Media Stadium | 26 Jul 2025 | 4 |

Most consecutive wins

- 2 (3 August 2025 — 9 August 2025)
- 2 (14 September 2025 and 5 July 2026)
- 2 (18 July 2026 — 26 July 2026)

Most consecutive losses

- 5 (16 August 2026 to 13 September 2026) (current)
- 2 (15 September 2018 — 21 September 2018)
- 2 (3 October 2020 — 10 October 2020)
- 2 (20 July 2025 — 26 July 2025)

Biggest comeback

- Recovered from 6 point deficit to win. Trailed Sydney Roosters 0-6 after 26 minutes at AAMI Park on September 14, 2019 and won 16-12.

Worst collapse

- Surrendered 10 point lead. Led Sharks 26-16 after 41 minutes at Go Media Stadium on September 5, 2026 and lost 32-40.

== Inaugural team ==
First match and first win

| Result | Score | Opponent | Venue | Date | Ref |
|---|---|---|---|---|---|
| Won | 10–4 | Sydney Roosters | ANZ Stadium | 8 Sep 2018 | |

=== First team ===
The first New Zealand Warriors team played the Sydney Roosters on 8 September 2018 at ANZ Stadium. The Warriors won the match 10-4.

| Jersey | Position | Player |
|---|---|---|
| 1 | Fullback | Apii Nicholls |
| 2 | Wing | Langi Veainu |
| 3 | Centre | Shontelle Woodman |
| 4 | Centre | Sarina Clark |
| 5 | Wing | Hilda Peters |
| 6 | Five-eighth | Laura Mariu (c) |
| 7 | Halfback | Georgia Hale |
| 8 | Prop | Annetta-Claudia Nu'uausala |
| 9 | Hooker | Krystal Rota |
| 10 | Prop | Aieshaleigh Smalley |
| 11 | Second-row | Onjeurlina Leiataua |
| 12 | Second-row | Alice Vailea |
| 13 | Lock | Luisa Gago |
| 14 | Prop | Tanika-Jazz Noble-Bell |
| 15 | Second-row | Lorina Papali'i |
| 16 | Prop | Kahurangi Peters |
| 17 | Lock | Sui Tauaua-Pauaraisa |
| | Coach | Luisa Avaiki |

== Representative players ==
=== National team representatives ===
Past and current players who have been selected to play for a national women's team and competed internationally.

| Player | Years represented | Country |
|---|---|---|
| Billy-Jean Ale | 2019 | New Zealand |
| Racquel Anderson | 2019 | New Zealand |
| Shakira Baker | 2025 | New Zealand |
| Madison Bartlett | 2019 | New Zealand |
| Georgia Hale | 2018–2019 | New Zealand |
| Tysha Ikenasio | 2025 | New Zealand |
| Amber Kani | 2018–2019 | New Zealand |
| Ivana Lauitiiti | 2025 | New Zealand |
| Onjeurlina Leiataua | 2018–2019 | New Zealand |
| Patricia Maliepo | 2025 | New Zealand |
| Hilda Mariu | 2019 | New Zealand |
| Laura Mariu | 2018 | New Zealand |
| Jules Newman | 2019 | New Zealand |
| Apii Nicholls | 2019 | New Zealand |
| Annetta Nu'uausala | 2018–2019 | New Zealand |
| Sui Tauasa Pauaraisa | 2018 | New Zealand |
| Kanyon Paul | 2020 | New Zealand |
| Charntay Poko | 2019 | New Zealand |
| Krystal Rota | 2018–2019 | New Zealand |
| Aieshaleigh Smalley | 2018–2019 | New Zealand |
| Crystal Tamarua | 2018–2020 | New Zealand |
| Langi Veainu | 2018 | New Zealand |
| Kathleen Wharton | 2019 | New Zealand |
| Kaiyah Atai | 2025 | Cook Islands |
| Lavinia Kitai | 2025 | Cook Islands |
| Lydia Turua-Quedley | 2025 | Cook Islands |
| Emmanita Paki | 2025 | Tonga |

=== All-Stars representatives ===
Past and current players who have played for the Indigenous All-Stars or for the Māori All-Stars.

==== Indigenous All Stars ====
| Player | Year(s) |
|---|---|
NIL

==== Māori All Stars (Māori people) ====
| Player | Year(s) |
|---|---|
| Harata Butler | 2025-2026 |
| Gayle Broughton | 2026 |
| Payton Takimoana | 2026 |
| Mya Hill-Moana | 2026 |
| Shakira Baker | 2026 |

== See also ==
- NZRL Women's National Tournament
