= Lavinia Tauhalaliku =

NZ & Tonga international rugby league player

Personal information
- Born: 27 August 1999 (age 27) Nuku'alofa, Tonga

Playing information
- Position: Wing, Centre, Fullback
Club
| Years | Team | Pld | T | G | FG | P |
|---|---|---|---|---|---|---|
| 2024 | Nth Qld Cowboys | 4 | 1 | 0 | 0 | 4 |
| 2025– | New Zealand Warriors | 7 | 10 | 0 | 0 | 40 |
| | Total | 11 | 11 | 0 | 0 | 44 |
Representative
| Years | Team | Pld | T | G | FG | P |
| 2020 | New Zealand | 1 | 0 | 0 | 0 | 0 |
| 2022–24 | Tonga | 3 | 1 | 0 | 0 | 4 |
- Source: RLP As of 1 November 2026

Lavinia Tauhalaliku (born 27 August 1999) is a Tongan professional rugby league footballer who currently plays for the New Zealand Warriors in the NRL Women's Premiership.

She is a New Zealand and Tongan international, having previously played for the North Queensland Cowboys.

== Background ==
Tauhalaliku was born in Nuku'alofa and attended Tupou High School.

== Playing career ==
=== Early years ===
Tauhalaliku began playing rugby league in Auckland, New Zealand for the Mangere East Hawks.

She had previously played rugby union for Manurewa and the Counties Manukau women's team in 2018 and 2019. In 2019 she was named to the Bolt team in the Red Bull Ignite7.

In October 2020. she was selected for the New Zealand for their match against Fetū Samoa, starting at fullback.

In June 2022, she was selected for Mate Ma'a Tonga. On 22 June 2022 she was appointed captain of Tonga.

In 2023, she played for the City side in Auckland, a combined Ponsonby Ponies and Pt Chevalier Pirates side that competed in the Auckland Rugby League competition. She was the leading try scorer with 15 from 13 games and was awarded the 2023 Auckland Rugby League club player of the year award at their prize giving.

=== 2024 ===
In July, Tauhalaliku joined the Manly Sea Eagles inaugural women's side in the NSWRL Women's Premiership. In Round 6, she scored five tries in a win over the South Sydney Rabbitohs.

In August, Tauhalaliku joined the North Queensland Cowboys NRLW side for the remainder of the 2024 season as an injury replacement player. In Round 6 of the NRLW season, she made her debut in a loss to the Brisbane Broncos. In Round 7, she scored her first try in a 24–22 win over Wests Tigers.

On 18 September, she signed with the New Zealand Warriors on a three-year contract starting in 2025.
