= 2019 NRL Women's season squads =

Australasian rugby league teams

The 2019 NRL Women's Premiership comprised 4 competing teams. Starting squad size was 22 players. Contracts were for the short pre-season and four-week season.

Requests to replace players injured during the pre-season could be sought from the administrative body, the National Rugby League.

The 4 clubs in total used 82 players. Each club used between 19 and 22 players. Six contracted players went unused. 36 players made their NRLW debut in what was the second season of the competition.

During the season, 36 tries were scored by 29 individual players. So, 35.37% of players scored at least one try. A tally of 24 goals was kicked by 5 players, with the Brisbane Broncos using two kickers. No field-goals were kicked during the season.

The NRLW was preceded by several matches and tournaments that involved NRLW players:

- Indigenous versus Māori All Stars on 15 February 2019. Eight members of the Māori team and seven from the Indigenous side played NRLW in 2019.
- Australian National Championships from 30 May to 2 June 2019.
- New Zealand National Championships
- New South Wales versus Queensland on 21 June 2019. 31 of 34 participants played NRLW in 2019.
- New Zealand versus Samoa on 22 June 2019. Fifteen Kiwi Ferns played in the 2019 NRLW season. Billy-Jean Ale played for Samoa in this game and for the Kiwi Ferns on 25 October 2019.
- Fiji versus Papua New Guinea on 22 June 2019. Two Fijians (Timaima Ravisa and Roela Radiniyavuni) plus 18th player Aliti Namoce played NRLW in 2019.

Two representative matches and a nines tournament involving NRLW players followed the NRLW season:

- Prime Minister’s XIII match between Fiji and Australia on 11 October 2019.
- 2019 Rugby League World Cup 9s – Women's tournament on 18 and 19 October 2019.
- Australia versus New Zealand on 25 October 2019.

== Brisbane Broncos ==
The Broncos were coached by Kelvin Wright. Ali Brigginshaw was appointed captain.

J#	Player	Age	Position(s)	Club	NRLW Career			NRLW 2018	2019 NRLW					2019 Reps
J#	Player	Age	Position(s)	Club	Debut	S	M	NRLW 2018	M	T	G	F	Pts	Int'l	Origin	Other
14	Tarryn Aiken	20	Lock	Tweed Heads Seagulls	2019	1	4	—	4	0	0	0	0	—	—	—
1	Chelsea Baker	33	Fullback	Gladstone Wallabies	2018	2	7	4	3	0	3	0	6	—		—
11	Annette Brander	26	Second-row	Souths Logan Magpies	2018	2	7	3	4	1	0	0	4			—
7	Ali Brigginshaw	29	Halfback	Ipswich Brothers	2018	2	8	4	4	1	0	0	4			—
16	Mariah Denman	22	Lock, Prop	—	2018	2	7	3	4	0	0	0	0	—	—	—
8	Millie Elliott	21	Prop	Burleigh Bears	2019	1	4	—	4	0	0	0	0			—
–	Jessika Elliston	21	Second-row	Tweed Heads Seagulls	2019	1	1	—	1	0	0	0	0	—		—
9	Lavinia Gould	36	Hooker	— Queensland Reds	2018	2	8	4	4	1	0	0	4	—	—	—
12	Tazmin Rapana	24	Second-row	Burleigh Bears	2018	2	8	4	4	0	0	0	0	—		—
10	Amber Hall	24	Prop	—	2019	1	4	—	4	1	0	0	4		—	—
15	Stephanie Hancock	37	Prop	Souths Logan Magpies	2018	2	8	4	4	0	0	0	0	—		—
17	Chelsea Lenarduzzi	23	Second-row	Burleigh Bears	2018	2	7	4	3	1	0	0	4			—
6	Raecene McGregor	21	Five-eighth	Cabramatta Two Blues	2018	2	7	3	4	1	0	0	4		—	—
13	Rona Peters	31	Lock	Runaway Bay Seagulls	2018	2	8	4	4	2	0	0	8	—
4	Amber Pilley	21	Centre	Burleigh Bears	2018	2	8	4	4	2	0	0	8	—
2	Julia Robinson	21	Wing	Wests Panthers	2018	2	7	4	3	1	0	0	4	—	—	—
3	Amy Turner	35	Centre	Wests Panthers	2019	1	4	—	4	1	0	0	4	—		—
18	Tamika Upton	22	Fullback, Wing	Yeppoon Seagulls	2019	1	3	—	3	1	0	0	4	—	—	—
5	Meg Ward	25	Wing	Souths Logan Magpies	2018	2	6	3	3	1	5	0	14	—		—

The Broncos announced player signings in several groupings from early June 2019 onwards:

1. Ali Brigginshaw, Chelsea Baker, Heather Ballinger and Steph Hancock.
2. Tarryn Aiken, Amber Hall, Rona Peters, Amber Pilley, and Meg Ward.
3. Annette Brander.
4. Jessika Elliston, Lavinia Gould, Chelsea Lenarduzzi, Julia Robinson, and Rosemary Vaimili-Toalepai.
5. Tazmin Gray, Taylor Mapusua, and Amy Turner.
6. Millie Boyle, Mariah Storch, and Tamika Upton.
7. Raecene McGregor.

== New Zealand Warriors ==
The Warriors were coached by Luisa Avaiki. Georgia Hale was appointed captain.

The Warriors unveiled their 22-player squad on 26 August 2019.

J#	Player	Age	Position(s)	Club	NRLW Career			NRLW 2018	2019 NRLW					2019 Reps
J#	Player	Age	Position(s)	Club	Debut	S	M	NRLW 2018	M	T	G	F	Pts	Int'l	Origin	Other
16	Billy-Jean Ale	28	Prop	Mt Albert Lions	2019	1	3	—	3	0	0	0	0		—	—
5	Madison Bartlett	24	Wing	Richmond Roses	2019	1	2	—	2	1	0	0	4		—	—
6	Georgia Hale	24	Five-eighth, Lock	Richmond Roses	2018	2	6	3	3	1	0	0	4		—	—
–	Onjeurlina Leiataua	23	Second-row	Otahuhu Leopards	2018	2	4	3	1	1	0	0	4		—	—
17	Amber Kani	28	Centre	Manurewa Marlins	2018	2	2	1	1	0	0	0	0	—	—
24	Onjeurlina Leiataua	23	Second-row	Otahuhu Leopards	2018	2	5	3	2	0	0	0	0		—	—
4	Jules Newman	30	Centre	Mt Albert Lions	2019	1	3	—	3	0	0	0	0		—	—
1	Apii Nicholls	26	Fullback	Papakura Sea Eagles	2018	2	6	3	3	0	4	0	8		—	—
21	Tanika-Jazz Noble-Bell	23	Second-row, Prop	Mt Albert Lions	2018	2	4	2	2	0	0	0	0	—	—	—
8	Annetta Nu'uausala	24	Prop	Richmond Roses	2018	2	4	1	3	1	0	0	4		—	—
14	Kanyon Paul	21	Hooker	Hamilton City Tigers	2019	1	2	—	2	0	0	0	0	—	—	—
2	Hilda Peters	36	Wing	Papakura Sea Eagles	2018	2	6	3	3	0	0	0	0		—
7	Charntay Poko	23	Halfback	Richmond Roses	2019	1	3	—	3	1	0	0	4		—	—
–	Roela Radiniyavuni	29	Wing	Richmond Roses	2019	1	1	—	1	0	0	0	0		—	—
–	Timaima Ravisa	31	Five-eighth	Richmond Roses	2019	1	2	—	2	0	0	0	0		—	—
–	Tyler Reid	25	Prop	Papakura Sea Eagles	2019	1	1	—	1	0	0	0	0	—	—	—
9	Krystal Rota	33	Hooker	Papakura Sea Eagles	2018	2	6	3	3	0	0	0	0		—
15	Tasia Seumanufagai	30	Lock, Second-row	Truganina Rabbitohs	2019	1	1	—	1	0	0	0	0	—	—	—
–	Aieshaleigh Smalley	28	Prop	Otahuhu Leopards	2018	2	5	3	2	0	0	0	0		—	—
12	Crystal Tamarua	24	Second-row	Richmond Roses	2018	2	4	1	3	0	0	0	0		—	—
3	Atawhai Tupaea	30	Centre	Papakura Sea Eagles	2019	1	3	—	3	1	0	0	4		—	—
11	Kathleen Wharton	36	Second-row, Lock	Papakura Sea Eagles	2019	1	3	—	3	0	0	0	0	—	—	—

Notes:

- The Warriors' captain in the 2018 season, Laura Mariu, was unavailable for the 2019 season due to a shoulder injury.

== St George Illawarra Dragons ==
The Dragons were coached by Daniel Lacey. Kezie Apps was appointed captain.

J#	Player	Age	Position(s)	Club	NRLW Career			NRLW 2018	2019 NRLW					2019 Reps
J#	Player	Age	Position(s)	Club	Debut	S	M	NRLW 2018	M	T	G	F	Pts	Int'l	Origin	Other
11	Kezie Apps	28	Second-row	Helensburgh Tigers	2018	2	7	3	4	1	0	0	4			—
8	Ngatokotoru Arakua	22	Prop	Mt Albert Lions	2018	2	8	4	4	0	0	0	0	—	—	—
12	Shaylee Bent	19	Second-row	Mounties	2019	1	4	—	4	1	0	0	4	—	—
–	Kimiora Breayley-Nati	31	Five-eighth	—	2018	2	5	4	1	0	0	0	0	—	—	—
9	Brittany Breayley-Nati	28	Hooker	Ipswich Brothers	2018	2	8	4	4	0	0	0	0	—		—
6	Keeley Davis	19	Five-eighth	Corrimal Cougars	2018	2	7	3	4	0	0	0	0		—	—
14	Aaliyah Fasavalu-Fa'amausili	18	Lock	Wentworthville Magpies	2019	1	3	—	3	0	0	0	0	—	—	—
10	Maitua Feterika	27	Prop	St Marys Saints	2018	2	8	4	4	1	0	0	4		—	—
–	Teuila Fotu-Moala	25	Prop	North Sydney Bears	2018	2	5	4	1	0	0	0	0		—	—
17	Najvada George	20	Prop	Wests Tigers	2019	1	3	—	3	0	0	0	0	—	—	—
2	Rikeya Horne	20	Wing	Cabramatta Two Blues	2018	2	6	3	3	0	0	0	0	—	—	—
15	Takilele Katoa	28	Prop	Griffith Waratah Tigers	2019	1	4	—	4	0	0	0	0	—		—
19	Stephanie Mooka	28	Wing	Wests Panthers	2019	1	1	—	1	0	0	0	0	—		—
4	Tiana Penitani-Gray	23	Centre	Cronulla-Sutherland Sharks	2019	1	4	—	4	2	0	0	8			—
3	Jessica Sergis	22	Centre	Helensburgh Tigers	2018	2	7	3	4	3	0	0	12			—
7	Maddie Studdon	24	Halfback	Cronulla-Sutherland Sharks	2018	2	6	2	4	0	8	0	16	—		—
5	Shakiah Tungai	22	Wing	Port Kembla Blacks	2018	2	7	3	4	2	0	0	8
1	Botille Vette-Welsh	23	Fullback	Wests Tigers	2018	2	5	1	4	1	0	0	4
16	Maddison Weatherall	18	Prop	Illawarra Steelers	2019	1	4	—	4	0	0	0	0	—	—	—
13	Holli Wheeler	29	Lock	Newcastle Knights	2018	2	7	3	4	0	0	0	0			—

The Dragons announced player signings in several groupings from mid-June 2019 onwards:

1. Kezie Apps, Shaylee Bent, Takilele Katoa, Tiana Penitani, Jessica Sergis, Maddie Studdon, Shakiah Tungai, Botille Vette-Welsh , and Holli Wheeler.
2. Aaliyah Fasavalu-Fa'amausili, Keeley Davis, Rikeya Horne, and Maddison Weatherall.
3. Brittany Breayley, Maitua Feterika, Teuila Fotu-Moala, and Kimiora Nati.
4. Ngatokotoru Arakua, Najvada George, Alexandrea Kiriwi, Stephanie Mooka, and Sarah Togatuki.

== Sydney Roosters ==
The Roosters were coached by Rick Stone. Simaima Taufa was appointed captain.

J#	Player	Age	Position(s)	Club	NRLW Career			NRLW 2018	2019 NRLW					2019 Reps
J#	Player	Age	Position(s)	Club	Debut	S	M	NRLW 2018	M	T	G	F	Pts	Int'l	Origin	Other
15	Jasmin Allende	23	Second-row	South Sydney Rabbitohs	2019	1	1	—	1	0	0	0	0	—	—	—
1	Corban Baxter	25	Fullback	Cronulla-Sutherland Sharks	2019	1	3	—	3	0	0	0	0			—
2	Karina Brown	30	Wing	East Brisbane Tigers	2018	2	7	4	3	0	0	0	0	—		—
6	Kirra Dibb	22	Five-eighth	North Sydney Bears	2019	1	3	—	3	0	4	0	8			—
14	Quincy Dodd	19	Hooker	Cronulla-Sutherland Sharks	2019	1	1	—	1	0	0	0	0	—	—
16	Vanessa Foliaki	26	Prop	East Brisbane Tigers	2018	2	7	4	3	0	0	0	0	—		—
11	Tallisha Harden	27	Second-row	Burleigh Bears	2018	2	4	1	3	0	0	0	0
7	Melanie Howard	26	Halfback	Newcastle Knights	2018	2	5	3	2	1	0	0	4	—	—	—
17	Caitlan Johnston-Green	18	Prop	Newcastle Knights	2019	1	3	—	3	0	0	0	0	—	—
4	Isabelle Kelly	23	Centre	Newcastle Knights	2018	2	7	4	3	0	0	0	0			—
3	Bobbi Law	22	Centre	Newcastle Knights	2019	1	1	—	1	1	0	0	4	—	—	—
9	Nita Maynard-Perrin	27	Hooker	North Sydney Bears	2018	2	7	4	3	0	0	0	0		—	—
10	Aliti Namoce	21	Prop	North Sydney Bears	2019	1	3	—	3	0	0	0	0	—	—	—
18	Shanice Parker	21	Wing	North Sydney Bears	2019	1	1	—	1	0	0	0	0	—	—	—
8	Ruan Sims	37	Prop	Cronulla-Sutherland Sharks	2018	2	6	3	3	1	0	0	4	—	—	—
–	Simone Smith	26	Halfback	Newcastle Knights	2019	1	1	—	1	0	0	0	0	—	—	—
12	Hannah Southwell	20	Second-row	Newcastle Knights	2018	2	6	3	3	0	0	0	0			—
–	Shontelle Stowers	32	Centre	North Sydney Bears	2018	2	6	4	2	0	0	0	0	—		—
–	Kiana Takairangi	27	Wing	Cronulla-Sutherland Sharks	2019	1	2	—	2	0	0	0	0		—	—
–	Simaima Taufa	25	Lock	Mounties	2018	2	6	4	2	2	0	0	8			—
13	Zahara Temara	22	Five-eighth, Lock	—	2018	2	7	4	3	0	0	0	0	—	—
–	Rebecca Young	37	Prop	Newcastle Knights	2019	1	2	—	2	0	0	0	0	—	—
