= 2026 NRL Women's season =

Australian women's rugby league 2026 season

NRL Telstra Women's Premiership
- Duration: 2 July 2026 to 4 October 2026
- Teams: 12
- Premiers: Sydney Roosters (3rd title)
- Minor premiers: Sydney Roosters (3rd title)
- Matches played: 71
- Points scored: 3,176
- Highest attendance: 47,451; Roosters v Broncos; Accor Stadium; 4 October, Grand Final
- Broadcast partners: Nine Network; Fox League; Sky Sport (NZ); Sky Sports (UK)
- Wooden spoon: St. George Illawarra Dragons (3rd spoon)
- Biggest home win: Roosters 66–8 Warriors (Round 8)
- Biggest away win: Tigers 0–58 Titans (Round 10)
- Dally M Medal: Tamika Upton
- Top point-scorer: Jesse Southwell 120
- Top try-scorer: Jessica Sergis 17

The 2026 NRL Women's season will be the ninth professional season of the NRL Women's Premiership. The website League Unlimited reported that the 2026 NRLW season will follow the same format of the 2025 season, with twelve teams playing eleven rounds, with the Grand Final to be held on the same day as the men's NRL Grand Final, on Sunday, 4 October 2026 at Accor Stadium.

== Teams ==
The twelve teams that participated in the 2025 season will again compete in 2026: seven from New South Wales, three from Queensland and one each from the Australian Capital Territory and New Zealand.

Club	Season	Home ground(s)	Head coach	Captain(s)	Titles	Ref
Brisbane Broncos	9th	Suncorp Stadium and Totally Workwear Stadium	Scott Prince	Tamika Upton	4	
Canberra Raiders	4th	GIO Stadium	Darrin Borthwick	Simaima Taufa (10: Rounds 1 to 10) and Zahara Temara (13)	0	
Canterbury-Bankstown Bulldogs	2nd	Accor Stadium and Belmore Sports Ground	Brayden Wiliame	Tayla Preston (11) and Angelina Teakaraanga-Katoa (11)	0	
Cronulla Sharks	4th	Ocean Protect Stadium	Tony Herman	Tiana Penitani-Gray (8) also Quincy Dodd (3: Rounds 1, 3 & 4)	0	
Gold Coast Titans	6th	Cbus Super Stadium	Karyn Murphy	Georgia Hale	0	
Newcastle Knights	6th	McDonald Jones Stadium	Ben Jeffries	Yasmin Meakes (3) also Kayla Romaniuk (9: Rounds 4 to 11 & EF)	2	
New Zealand Warriors	5th	Go Media Stadium and FMG Stadium Waikato	Ronald Griffiths	Apii Nicholls (8) also Kaiyah Atai (3: Rounds 8 to 10)	0	
North Queensland Cowboys	4th	Queensland Country Bank Stadium	Ricky Henry	Emma Manzelmann (6) also Bree Chester (5: Rounds 7 to 11)	0	
Parramatta Eels	6th	CommBank Stadium and Eric Tweedale Stadium	Steve Georgallis	Mahalia Murphy (11)	0	
St. George Illawarra Dragons	9th	WIN Stadium Jubilee Stadium and Allianz Stadium	Nathan Cross	Brooke Anderson (11)	0	
Sydney Roosters	9th	Allianz Stadium and Polytec Stadium	John Strange	Isabelle Kelly	2	
Wests Tigers	4th	Leichhardt Oval, Campbelltown Sports Stadium, CommBank Stadium and Allianz Stadium	Craig Sandercock	Kezie Apps (10) also Raecene McGregor (2: Rounds 7 & 11)	0	

Notes:

- Craig Sandercock is to coach an NRLW side for the first time in 2026.
- In late October 2025, the St George Illawarra Dragons announced the extension of Head Coach Nathan Cross until the end of the 2027 NRLW season.
- New Zealand Warriors joined forces with the Rabbitohs in a NRLW Pathways partnership for season 2026. As part of the agreement, Warriors players who were not picked to play NRLW we eligible to play for the South Sydney Rabbitohs in the Harvey Norman NSW Women's Premiership.

== Ladder ==
As of 13 September 2026 — After Game 6 of Round 11

Pos	Club	Pld	W	D	L	PF	PA	PD	Pts	Qualification
1	Sydney Roosters	11	11	0	0	434	116	+318	22	Advance to second round of finals series (first-round bye)
2	Gold Coast Titans	11	10	0	1	342	158	+184	20	Advance to second round of finals series (first-round bye)
3	Brisbane Broncos	11	8	0	3	340	182	+158	16	Advance to finals series
4	Wests Tigers	11	7	0	4	239	296	−57	14	Advance to finals series
5	Canberra Raiders	11	6	0	5	265	161	+104	12	Advance to finals series
6	Newcastle Knights	11	5	0	6	284	192	+92	10	Advance to finals series
7	New Zealand Warriors	11	4	0	7	240	310	−70	8	
8	Parramatta Eels	11	4	0	7	198	314	−116	8	
9	Cronulla-Sutherland Sharks	11	3	0	8	188	278	−90	6	
10	North Queensland Cowboys	11	3	0	8	178	375	−197	6	
11	Canterbury-Bankstown Bulldogs	11	3	0	8	174	374	−200	6	
12	St George Illawarra Dragons	11	2	0	9	138	264	−126	4	

=== Ladder progression ===
- Numbers highlighted in green indicate that the team finished the round inside the top six.
- Numbers highlighted in blue indicates the team finished first on the ladder in that round.
- Numbers highlighted in red indicates the team finished last place on the ladder in that round.
- As of 15 September 2026

Pos	Club	1	2	3	4	5	6	7	8	9	10	11
1	Sydney Roosters	2	4	6	8	10	12	14	16	18	20	22
2	Gold Coast Titans	0	2	4	6	8	10	12	14	16	18	20
3	Brisbane Broncos	2	4	6	8	10	10	10	10	12	14	16
4	Wests Tigers	2	4	4	4	6	8	10	12	14	14	14
5	Newcastle Knights	2	2	4	4	6	6	6	6	8	10	10
6	Canberra Raiders	2	4	4	4	4	6	8	10	10	10	12
7	New Zealand Warriors	2	2	4	6	6	8	8	8	8	8	8
8	Parramatta Eels	0	0	0	0	0	0	2	4	4	6	8
9	Canterbury-Bankstown Bulldogs	0	0	2	4	4	6	6	6	6	6	6
10	North Queensland Cowboys	0	0	0	0	2	2	4	6	6	6	6
11	Cronulla-Sutherland Sharks	0	0	0	2	2	2	2	2	2	4	6
12	St George Illawarra Dragons	0	2	2	2	2	2	2	2	4	4	4

== Scheduling ==
The start, duration, and conclusion of the 2026 season will be influenced by several factors.

- A seven-week preparation period.
- Two weeks of leave.
- A six teams over three weeks final series. Winners of 3rd place versus 6th place and 4th place versus 5th place in Week 1 elimination finals then meet 1st place and 2nd place in Week 2 semi-finals. Winners of the semi-finals meet in the Grand Final in Week 3.
- Decision on the length of the regular season. In 2025, eleven rounds were played, the minimum required for the twelve teams to play each of their opponents once.
- A three-match Women's State of Origin series to be played on 30 April (Newcastle), 14 May (Brisbane), and 28 May (Gold Coast) 2026.
- The NRL (men's) Grand Final Day, expected to be 4 October 2026.

== Trial matches ==
Trial matches were announced in the days prior to the weekend of June 19, 20 and 21, 2026.

Home	Score	Away	Match information					
Home	Score	Away	Date and time	Format	Venue	Referees	Attendance	Reports
Parramatta Eels	36–6	Canterbury-Bankstown Bulldogs	Friday 19 June; 6:15 PM	NRLW (Only)	Eric Tweedale Stadium	Brayden Hunt		
Canberra Raiders	10–22	Newcastle Knights	Saturday 20 June; 11:30 AM	NRLW (Only)	Raiders Belconnen	Dillane Wells		
North Queensland Cowboys	24–16*	Gold Coast Titans	Saturday 20 June; 12:30 PM	NRLW (Only)	Jack Manski Oval, Kirwan			
Sydney Roosters	28–4*	Cronulla-Sutherland Sharks	Saturday 20 June; 6:00 PM (time TBC)	NRLW (Only)	Leichhardt Oval	Ethan Klein		
New Zealand Warriors	10–12	Brisbane Broncos	Sunday 21 June; 9:00 AM	NRLW; NRL	One NZ Stadium, Christchurch	Jack Feavers		
St. George Illawarra	12–32*	Wests Tigers	Sunday 21 June; 2:45 PM	NRLW (Only)	St George Venues Jubilee Stadium	Tom Stindl		

- — Conversions were not attempted in three of the six matches.

== Regular season ==
The draw for NRLW Magic Round was announced on 13 November 2025 and will be in Round 5. The full NRLW draw was published alongside the men's NRL full draw the following day, 14 November 2025.

The regular season will consist of a grand total of 66 matches.

The schedule includes 30 double-headers. In all 30 instances:

- The home club is the same.
- The away clubs are different. In 2025, 18 double-headers featured away teams from the same club.
- The NRLW game is played prior to the NRL game. In 2025, double-headers had some NRLW games being played second.

=== Round 1 ===
Home	Score	Away	Match information					
Home	Score	Away	Date and time	Format	Venue	Referees	Attendance	Reports
Cronulla-Sutherland Sharks	4–18	Newcastle Knights	Thursday 2 July; 7:45 PM	NRLW (Only)	Ocean Protect Stadium	Liam Kennedy	2,109	
Gold Coast Titans	10–34	Sydney Roosters	Saturday 4 July; 12:45 PM	NRLW (Only)	Cbus Super Stadium	Tori Wilkie	1,380	
St. George Illawarra Dragons	4–20	Canberra Raiders	Saturday 4 July; 3:15 PM	NRLW; NRL	Jubilee Stadium	Peter Gough	3,631	
Brisbane Broncos	50–4	North Queensland Cowboys	Saturday 4 July; 5:15 PM	NRLW; NRL	Suncorp Stadium	Belinda Sharpe	14,371	
Parramatta Eels	16–28	Wests Tigers	Sunday 5 July; 11:50 AM	NRLW; NRL	CommBank Stadium	Kasey Badger	7,547	
New Zealand Warriors	32–10	Canterbury-Bankstown Bulldogs	Sunday 5 July; 1:45 PM	NRLW (Only)	FMG Stadium Waikato	Ziggy Przeklasa-Adamski	4,928	

=== Round 2 ===
Home	Score	Away	Match information					
Home	Score	Away	Date and time	Format	Venue	Referees	Attendance	Reports
Cronulla-Sutherland Sharks	16–22	Brisbane Broncos	Thursday 9 July; 7:45 PM	NRLW (Only)	Ocean Protect Stadium	Belinda Sharpe	1,496	
North Queensland Cowboys	18–30	Wests Tigers	Saturday 11 July; 12:45 PM	NRLW (Only)	Queensland Country Bank Stadium	Tori Wilkie	2,109	
Canterbury-Bankstown Bulldogs	10–36	Gold Coast Titans	Saturday 11 July; 3:15 PM	NRLW; NRL	Accor Stadium	Liam Kennedy	8,649	
Sydney Roosters	12–10	Newcastle Knights	Saturday 11 July; 5:15 PM	NRLW; NRL	Allianz Stadium	Ziggy Przeklasa-Adamski	7,219	
Canberra Raiders	42–16	New Zealand Warriors	Sunday 12 July; 12:00 PM	NRLW (Only)	GIO Stadium	Kieren Irons	1,646	
St. George Illawarra Dragons	22–8	Parramatta Eels	Sunday 12 July; 1:45 PM	NRLW (Only)	WIN Stadium	Kasey Badger	1,801	

=== Round 3 ===
Home	Score	Away	Match information					
Home	Score	Away	Date and time	Format	Venue	Referees	Attendance	Reports
Canberra Raiders	18–22	Sydney Roosters	Saturday 18 July; 12:45 PM	NRLW; NRL	GIO Stadium	Kasey Badger	4,060	
New Zealand Warriors	42–4	North Queensland Cowboys	Saturday 18 July; 3:15 PM	NRLW; NRL	Go Media Stadium	Belinda Sharpe	12,611	
Canterbury-Bankstown Bulldogs	24–18	Cronulla-Sutherland Sharks	Saturday 18 July; 5:15 PM	NRLW; NRL	Accor Stadium	Rochelle Tamarua	8,010	
Gold Coast Titans	50–12	Parramatta Eels	Sunday 19 July; 11:50 AM	NRLW; NRL	Cbus Super Stadium	Tori Wilkie	4,230	
Brisbane Broncos	40–12	Wests Tigers	Sunday 19 July; 1:45 PM	NRLW (Only)	Totally Workwear Stadium	Kieren Irons	1,884	
Newcastle Knights	38–0	St. George Illawarra Dragons	Sunday 19 July; 6:15 PM	NRLW (Only)	McDonald Jones Stadium	Liam Kennedy	1,897	

=== Round 4 ===
Home	Score	Away	Match information					
Home	Score	Away	Date and time	Format	Venue	Referees	Attendance	Reports
Canberra Raiders	10–22	Cronulla-Sutherland Sharks	Saturday 25 July; 12:45 PM	NRLW; NRL	GIO Stadium	Liam Kennedy	5,305	
Canterbury-Bankstown Bulldogs	28–8	St. George Illawarra Dragons	Saturday 25 July; 3:15 PM	NRLW; NRL	Accor Stadium	Ethan Klein		
North Queensland Cowboys	6–34	Gold Coast Titans	Saturday 25 July; 5:15 PM	NRLW; NRL	Queensland Country Bank Stadium	Peter Gough	10,093	
Parramatta Eels	12–14	New Zealand Warriors	Sunday 26 July; 12:00 PM	NRLW (Only)	Eric Tweedale Stadium	Rochelle Tamarua	622	
Brisbane Broncos	30–12	Newcastle Knights	Sunday 26 July; 1:45 PM	NRLW (Only)	Totally Workwear Stadium	Kasey Badger	2,017	
Wests Tigers	10–48	Sydney Roosters	Sunday 26 July; 6:15 PM	NRLW (Only)	Leichhardt Oval	Belinda Sharpe	834	

=== Round 5 (Magic Round) ===
Home	Score	Away	Match information					
Home	Score	Away	Date and time	Format	Venue	Referees	Attendance	Reports
Cronulla-Sutherland Sharks	20–32	Wests Tigers	Saturday 1 August; 11:35 AM	NRLW; NRLW; NRLW	Geohex Park, Wagga Wagga	Tori Wilkie	7,142	
St. George Illawarra Dragons	8–38	Sydney Roosters	Saturday 1 August; 1.25 PM	NRLW; NRLW; NRLW	Geohex Park, Wagga Wagga	Dillan Wells	7,142	
Canberra Raiders	16–18	North Queensland Cowboys	Saturday 1 August; 3:15 PM	NRLW; NRLW; NRLW	Geohex Park, Wagga Wagga	Kasey Badger	7,142	
Canterbury-Bankstown Bulldogs	4–34	Brisbane Broncos	Sunday 2 August; 11:35 AM	NRLW; NRLW; NRLW	Geohex Park, Wagga Wagga	Rochelle Tamarua	6,908	
New Zealand Warriors	16–18	Gold Coast Titans	Sunday 2 August; 1:25 PM	NRLW; NRLW; NRLW	Geohex Park, Wagga Wagga	Belinda Sharpe	6,908	
Parramatta Eels	12–32	Newcastle Knights	Sunday 2 August; 3:15 PM	NRLW; NRLW; NRLW	Geohex Park, Wagga Wagga	Ethan Klein	6,908	

=== Round 6 ===
Home	Score	Away	Match information					
Home	Score	Away	Date and time	Format	Venue	Referees	Attendance	Reports
Canterbury-Bankstown Bulldogs	28–26	North Queensland Cowboys	Saturday 8 August; 12:45 PM	NRLW (Only)	Belmore Sports Ground	Tori Wilkie	565	
Cronulla-Sutherland Sharks	10–24	Gold Coast Titans	Saturday 8 August; 3:15 PM	NRLW (Only)	Ocean Protect Stadium	Kasey Badger	1,325	
New Zealand Warriors	22–14	Newcastle Knights	Saturday 8 August; 5:15 PM	NRLW (Only)	FMG Stadium Waikato	Ziggy Przeklasa-Adamski	6,186	
Canberra Raiders	28–4	Brisbane Broncos	Sunday 9 August; 11:35 AM	NRLW; NRL	GIO Stadium	Belinda Sharpe	4,000	
St. George Illawarra Dragons	12–16	Wests Tigers	Sunday 9 August; 1:35 PM	NRLW; NRL	Jubilee Stadium	Ethan Klein		
Sydney Roosters	46–6	Parramatta Eels	Sunday 9 August; 6:15 PM	NRLW (Only)	Polytec Stadium	Peter Gough	2,016	

=== Round 7 ===
Home	Score	Away	Match information					
Home	Score	Away	Date and time	Format	Venue	Referees	Attendance	Reports
Gold Coast Titans	26–10	St. George Illawarra Dragons	Saturday 15 August; 12:45 PM	NRLW (Only)	Cbus Super Stadium	Tori Wilkie	1,007	
Parramatta Eels	30–18	Canterbury-Bankstown Bulldogs	Saturday 15 August; 3:15 PM	NRLW; NRL	CommBank Stadium	Karra-Lee Nolan		
Brisbane Broncos	20–34	Sydney Roosters	Saturday 15 August; 5:15 PM	NRLW; NRL	Suncorp Stadium	Kasey Badger	10,828	
Newcastle Knights	18–25	Canberra Raiders	Sunday 16 August; 11:50 AM	NRLW; NRL	McDonald Jones Stadium	Rochelle Tamarua		
Wests Tigers	30–22	New Zealand Warriors	Sunday 16 August; 1:45 PM	NRLW; NRL	CommBank Stadium	Belinda Sharpe	2,733	
North Queensland Cowboys	30–18	Cronulla-Sutherland Sharks	Sunday 16 August; 6:15 PM	NRLW (Only)	Queensland Country Bank Stadium	Josh Eaton	1,230	

=== Round 8 ===
Home	Score	Away	Match information					
Home	Score	Away	Date and time	Format	Venue	Referees	Attendance	Reports
Newcastle Knights	26–27	Wests Tigers	Saturday 22 August; 12:45 PM	NRLW; NRL	McDonald Jones Stadium	Ethan Klein	8,461	
Canterbury-Bankstown Bulldogs	4–48	Canberra Raiders	Saturday 22 August; 3:15 PM	NRLW (Only)	Belmore Sports Ground	Belinda Sharpe	545	
St. George Illawarra Dragons	28–32	North Queensland Cowboys	Saturday 22 August; 5:15 PM	NRLW; NRL	Allianz Stadium	Karra-Lee Nolan	1,756	
Gold Coast Titans	28–20	Brisbane Broncos	Sunday 23 August; 11:50 AM	NRLW; NRL	Cbus Super Stadium	Ziggy Przeklasa-Adamski	6,382	
Sydney Roosters	66–8	New Zealand Warriors	Sunday 23 August; 1:45 PM	NRLW; NRL	Allianz Stadium	Josh Eaton	6,950	
Cronulla-Sutherland Sharks	16–42	Parramatta Eels	Sunday 23 August; 6:15 PM	NRLW (Only)	Ocean Protect Stadium	Rochelle Tamarua	1,128	

=== Round 9 ===
Home	Score	Away	Match information					
Home	Score	Away	Date and time	Format	Venue	Referees	Attendance	Reports
Gold Coast Titans	26–20	Canberra Raiders	Saturday 29 August; 12:45 PM	NRLW; NRL	Cbus Super Stadium	Kasey Badger	7,893	
Sydney Roosters	36–8	Cronulla-Sutherland Sharks	Saturday 29 August; 3:15 PM	NRLW; NRL	Allianz Stadium	Karra-Lee Nolan	8,971	
North Queensland Cowboys	6–40	Newcastle Knights	Saturday 29 August; 5:15 PM	NRLW; NRL	Queensland Country Bank Stadium	Josh Eaton	5,469	
New Zealand Warriors	18–22	St. George Illawarra Dragons	Sunday 30 August; 11:50 AM	NRLW; NRL	Go Media Stadium	Rochelle Tamarua	12,704	
Parramatta Eels	10–44	Brisbane Broncos	Sunday 30 August; 1:45 PM	NRLW; NRL	CommBank Stadium	Belinda Sharpe	7,747	
Wests Tigers	44–14	Canterbury-Bankstown Bulldogs	Sunday 30 August; 6:15 PM	NRLW (Only)	Campbelltown Sports Ground	Luke Saldern	1,025	

=== Round 10 ===
Home	Score	Away	Match information					
Home	Score	Away	Date and time	Format	Venue	Referees	Attendance	Reports
New Zealand Warriors	32–40	Cronulla-Sutherland Sharks	Saturday 5 September; 12:45 PM	NRLW; NRL	Go Media Stadium	Peter Gough	9,525	
North Queensland Cowboys	6–56	Sydney Roosters	Saturday 5 September; 3:15 PM	NRLW; NRL	Queensland Country Bank Stadium	Izzy Davidson	3,416	
Newcastle Knights	56–22	Canterbury-Bankstown Bulldogs	Saturday 5 September; 5:15 PM	NRLW (Only)	McDonald Jones Stadium	Rochelle Tamarua	1,986	
St. George Illawarra Dragons	16–24	Brisbane Broncos	Sunday 6 September; 11:50 AM	NRLW; NRL	WIN Stadium	Tori Wilkie	3,642	
Wests Tigers	0–58	Gold Coast Titans	Sunday 6 September; 1:45 PM	NRLW (Only)	Campbelltown Sports Ground	Belinda Sharpe	1,630	
Canberra Raiders	16–17	Parramatta Eels	Sunday 6 September; 6:15 PM	NRLW (Only)	GIO Stadium	Karra-Lee Nolan	1,914	

=== Round 11 ===
Home	Score	Away	Match information					
Home	Score	Away	Date and time	Format	Venue	Referees	Attendance	Reports
Sydney Roosters	42–12	Canterbury-Bankstown Bulldogs	Thursday 10 September; 7:45 PM	NRLW (Only)	Allianz Stadium	Karra-Lee Nolan	851	
Wests Tigers	10–22	Canberra Raiders	Friday 11 September; 5:40 PM	NRLW (Only)	Leichhardt Oval	Kasey Badger	1,047	
Parramatta Eels	33–28	North Queensland Cowboys	Saturday 12 September; 12:00 PM	NRLW (Only)	CommBank Stadium	Tori Wilkie	772	
Cronulla-Sutherland Sharks	16–8	St. George Illawarra Dragons	Saturday 12 September; 5:10 PM	NRLW; NRL	Allianz Stadium	Izzy Davidson	1,865	
Brisbane Broncos	52–18	New Zealand Warriors	Sunday 13 September; 12:00 PM	NRLW (Only)	Totally Workwear Stadium	Rochelle Tamarua	2,238	
Newcastle Knights	20–32	Gold Coast Titans	Sunday 13 September; 1:45 PM	NRLW (Only)	McDonald Jones Stadium	Belinda Sharpe	2,146	

Notes:
- The Sharks v Dragons match was moved from Ocean Protect Stadium (at 1:45 PM) to Allianz Stadium (at 5:10 PM) to precede the NRL men's Finals Series Week 1 match between the Cronulla-Sutherland Sharks and North Queensland Cowboys.
- In the Eels v Cowboys match an experimental rule was trailed whereby the side conceding points had the option to either kick-off or receive the kick-off. In every instance, the conceding team elected to receive the kick-off.

== Finals series ==
=== Week 1 ===
The schedule for week one of the finals series was announced shortly before 6:30pm (AEST) on Sunday, 13 September 2026. In a graphic tile posted on social media, the NRL implicitly announced that the minor premiers (Roosters) would play the lowest-ranked winner of the week one qualifying finals. This is a change from the 2025 season.

Home	Score	Away	Match information					
Home	Score	Away	Date and time	Format	Venue	Referees	Attendance	Reports
Wests Tigers	0–6	Canberra Raiders	Friday 18 September; 7:50 PM	NRLW (Only)	Campbelltown Stadium	Belinda Sharpe	2,898	
Brisbane Broncos	40–16	Newcastle Knights	Saturday 19 September; 4:05 PM	NRLW (Only)	Totally Workwear Stadium	Kasey Badger	2,521	

=== Week 2 ===
The schedule for week two of the finals series was announced shortly after 6:00am (AEST) on Thursday, 17 September 2026.

Home	Score	Away	Match information					
Home	Score	Away	Date and time	Format	Venue	Referees	Attendance	Reports
Sydney Roosters	20–10	Canberra Raiders	Saturday 26 September; 7:50 PM	NRLW (Only)	Allianz Stadium	Kasey Badger	3,254	
Gold Coast Titans	8–20	Brisbane Broncos	Sunday 27 September; 1:05 PM	NRLW (Only)	Cbus Super Stadium	Belinda Sharpe	7,372	

=== Grand Final ===
Home	Score	Away	Match information					
Home	Score	Away	Date and time	Format	Venue	Referee	Attendance	Reports
Sydney Roosters	30–6	Brisbane Broncos	Sunday, 4 October; 4:00 PM	NRLW; NRL	Accor Stadium	Belinda Sharpe	47,451	

== Weekly awards ==
After each round, the NRL announced via social media one weekly award – Tackle of the Week. The player with the most fantasy points each round was determined by comparison of Player Stats in the respective match centres.

Round	Most Fantasy Points		Tackle of the Week		Ref
Round	Player	Points	Tackler	Tackled player	Ref
Sponsor	—		youi		
1	Jessica Sergis	77	Rory Owen	Emily Bass	
2	Jaime Chapman	84	Tallisha Harden	Raecene McGregor	
3	Lavinia Tauhalaliku	93	Tahlia O'Brien	Sidney Taylor	
4	Tamika Upton	83	Jada Taylor	Mackenzie Wiki	
5	Elsie Albert	76	Apii Nicholls & Emmanita Paki	Phoenix-Raine Hippi	
6	Sienna Lofipo	87	Leilani Wilson	Tallara Bamblett	
7	Makenzie Weale	110	Brooke Anderson	Lily Patston	
8	Krystal Blackwell	109	Laikha Clarke	Romy Teitzel	
9	Tenika Willison	90	Brydie Parker & Tarryn Aiken	Tiana Penitani Gray	
10	Jaime Chapman	80	Andie Robinson	Lucy Spain	
11	Teagan Levi	87	Leianne Tufuga	Portia Bourke	

== Team of the Year ==
=== Dally M Team of the Year ===
Announced on the evening of 30 September 2026.

Jersey	Position	Player
1	Fullback	Tamika Upton
2	Wing	Brydie Parker
3	Centre	Jessica Sergis
4	Centre	Isabelle Kelly
5	Wing	Julia Robinson
6	Five-eighth	Teagan Levi
7	Halfback	Raecene McGregor
8	Prop	Millie Elliott
9	Hooker	Keeley Nizza
10	Prop	Sarah Togatuki
11	Second-row	Evania Isa'ako
12	Second-row	Shaylee Bent
13	Lock	Olivia Kernick

=== Players' Dream Team ===
The Rugby League Players Association announced the 2026 Players' Dream team on 23 September 2026.

Jersey	Position	Player
1	Fullback	Tamika Upton
2	Wing	Brydie Parker
3	Centre	Jessica Sergis
4	Centre	Rory Owen
5	Wing	Mackenzie Wiki
6	Five-eighth	Teagan Levi
7	Halfback	Tarryn Aiken
8	Prop	Otesa Pule
9	Hooker	Keeley Nizza
10	Prop	Laikha Clarke
11	Second-row	Shaylee Bent
12	Second-row	Evania Isa'ako
13	Lock	Sienna Lofipo
14	Impact	Faythe Manera

== Individual awards ==
=== Dally M Medal Awards Night ===
Announced on the evening of 30 September 2026.

Dally M Medal Player of the Year:
Tamika Upton ( Brisbane Broncos)

Veronica White Medal:
Millie Elliott ( Sydney Roosters)

Captain of the Year:
Kezie Apps ( Wests Tigers)

Coach of the Year:
Karyn Murphy ( Gold Coast Titans)

Provan-Summons Medal:
New Zealand Warriors (team) for the haka they performed in tribute to Ali Brigginshaw in Round 11.

Rookie of the Year:
Mercedez Taulelei-Siala ( Newcastle Knights)

Try of the Year:
Mackenzie Wiki ( Canberra Raiders)
Her third try against the Gold Coast Titans in Round 9

Tackle of the Year:
Essay Banu ( North Queensland Cowboys)
On Ashleigh Quinlan (Canterbury-Bankstown Bulldogs) in Round 6

=== Statistical awards ===
Highest Point Scorer in Regular-season: Jocelyn Kelleher ( Sydney Roosters) 98 (1t 47g) and Jesse Southwell ( Brisbane Broncos) 98 (1t 47g)
Top Try Scorer in Regular-season: Jessica Sergis ( Sydney Roosters) 16

Highest Point Scorer in full season: Jesse Southwell ( Brisbane Broncos) 120 (2t 56g)
Top Try Scorer in full season: Jessica Sergis ( Sydney Roosters) 17

=== RLPA Players' Champion Awards ===
The Players' Champion:
Tamika Upton ( Brisbane Broncos)

Rookie of the Year:
Teagan Levi ( Gold Coast Titans)

Players' Recruit of the Year:
Raecene McGregor ( Wests Tigers)

The following award, selected from three nominees, was announced at the end of the season.
Dennis Tutty Award:
Emma Verran ( Cronulla-Sutherland Sharks)

The Rugby League Players Association announced monthly awards during the season. A panel of three former players selected five players for each month. All current players were eligible to vote for the monthly awards.

- July: Zahara Temara ( Canberra Raiders)

=== Club awards ===
Club	Player of the Year	Player's Player	Members' Award	Coach's Award	Rookie / Emerging Talent	Community	Ref
Brisbane Broncos	Tamika Upton	Tamika Upton	—	—	Georgia Bartlett	Ali Brigginshaw	
Canberra Raiders	Leianne Tufuga	—	—	Sheridan Gallagher	Ellie Brander	—	
Canterbury-Bankstown Bulldogs	Alexis Tauaneai	Alexis Tauaneai	Tayla Preston	Hope Millard	Leilani Wilson	Olivia Va'alele	
Cronulla-Sutherland Sharks	Quincy Dodd	Jacinta Carter	Ellie Johnston	—	Madison Ashby	Jada Taylor	
Gold Coast Titans	Teagan Levi & Sienna Lofipo	Georgia Hale	Teagan Levi	–	Fanua Rimoni	Jaime Chapman	
Newcastle Knights	Yet to be announced						
New Zealand Warriors	Kaiyah Atai	Stacey Waaka	Stacey Waaka	—	Christabelle Onesemo-Tuilaepa	—	
North Queensland Cowboys	Fran Goldthorp	Makenzie Weale	Fran Goldthorp	—	Charlize Lloyd-Phillips	—	
Parramatta Eels	Abbi Church	Abbi Church	Abbi Church	Rory Owen	Jasmin Morrissey	Martha Mataele	
St. George Illawarra Dragons	Kasey Reh	—	Teagan Berry	Ella Koster	Tahlia O’Brien	Ella Koster	
Sydney Roosters	Tarryn Aiken	Jessica Sergis	Jessica Sergis	—	Sariah Paki	Millie Elliott	
Wests Tigers	Raecene McGregor	Shaylee Bent	—	—	Namoe Gesa	—	

As clubs each define their own award categories there are awards that do not fit into the above categories:

- Brisbane Broncos
  - Best Back: Tamika Upton
  - Best Forward: Chelsea Lenarduzzi
  - Most Consistent: Lauren Dam
  - Play of the Year: Tamika Upton and Chelsea Lenarduzzi – Tap-back try in Round 3
- Canberra Raiders
  - Gordon McLucas Junior Representative of the Year (women) – Gabriella Savage
- Canterbury-Bankstown Bulldogs
  - NSW Women’s Premiership Player of the Year: Shanthie Lui
  - Tarsha Gale Cup Player of the Year: Alleya Scrivens
  - Lisa Fiaola Cup Player of the Year: Leilani Kavapalu
- Cronulla-Sutherland Sharks
  - NRLW Wellbeing and Education Excellence Award: Grace-Lee Weekes
  - NSW Women's Premiership Player of the Year: Georgia Willey
  - NSW Women's Premiership Players' Player: Leilani Ah Sam
  - NSW Women's Premiership Wellbeing and Education Excellence Award: Georgia Willey
- Gold Coast Titans
  - Effort Player award: Evania Isa'ako
  - Pathways Player of the Year: Lorren Ieli (Brisbane Tigers Under 19's & Open age)
- New Zealand Warriors
  - NRLW Clubwoman of the Year: Harata Butler
- North Queensland Cowboys
  - Townsville Bulletin Fan Choice Award: Essay Banu
  - Cowboys Way Award: Lily Peacock
- Parramatta Eels
  - Harvey Norman Women’s Premiership Coaches Award: Jessica Kennedy
  - Harvey Norman Women’s Premiership Players’ Player Award: Freedom Crichton Ropati
  - Harvey Norman Women’s Premiership Player of the Year: Freedom Crichton Ropati
- St. George Illawarra Dragons
  - Mark Coyne Trophy for Career Development: Madison Mulhall
- Sydney Roosters
  - Try of the Year: Otesa Pule (Round 11 v Bulldogs, 50 metre solo run)
  - Team Before Me Award: Francesca Faulkner
  - Harvey Norman Women's Premiership
    - Best and Fairest: Majayda Darcy
    - Players' Player: Majayda Darcy
    - Best Back: Talea Tonga
    - Best Forward: Aaliyah Paki
    - Coaches Award: Tyra Dymock

== Players and transfers ==
The 2026 season salary cap for clubs is $1,386,000 and the minimum wage for contracted players is $46,200. Squad size is 24 players plus 4 development players. In the recent seasons of 2023, 2024, and 2025, clubs were required to fill their 24-player roster by late May.
Players may be added to each club’s roster from outside the initial squad of 24 as injury replacements. This can be to cover season-ending injuries or a significant number of short-term injuries.

=== Transfers ===
Table last updated: 18 November 2026

2027 NRLW transfers
Player	2026 club	2027 club	Length of deal (years)	Announcement date	Reference
Tori Shipton	St George Illawarra Dragons (Sup)	Newcastle Knights	2	15 Jan 2026	
Emma Verran	Cronulla-Sutherland Sharks (Pregnancy)	St George Illawarra Dragons	3	12 Feb 2026	
Alexis Tauaneai	Canterbury-Bankstown Bulldogs	St George Illawarra Dragons	2	19 Mar 2026	
Angelina Teakaraanga-Katoa	Canterbury-Bankstown Bulldogs	St George Illawarra Dragons	1	20 Mar 2026	
Destiny Mino-Sinapati	Gold Coast Titans	Brisbane Broncos	2	7 Aug 2026	
Teagan Berry	St George Illawarra Dragons	Cronulla-Sutherland Sharks	2	22 Sep 2026	
Zali Hopkins	St George Illawarra Dragons	North Queensland Cowboys	3	30 Sep 2026	
Mamele Misa	Souths Logan Magpies	Parramatta Eels	2	8 Oct 2026	
Rima Butler	Sydney Roosters	Wests Tigers	3	12 Oct 2026	
Martha Mataele	Parramatta Eels	Brisbane Broncos	2	15 Oct 2026	
Jayme Millard	St George Illawarra Dragons	Wests Tigers	2	15 Oct 2026	
Sara Sautia	St George Illawarra Dragons	North Queensland Cowboys	2	15 Oct 2026	
Amanii Misa	Brisbane Broncos	North Queensland Cowboys	3	15 Oct 2026	
Makenzie Weale	North Queensland Cowboys	St George Illawarra Dragons	3	16 Oct 2026	
Sereana Naitokatoka	Canberra Raiders	Wests Tigers	3	20 Oct 2026	
Anastasia Leatupue	Sydney Roosters (Dev)	Wests Tigers	3	20 Oct 2026	
Ashleigh Quinlan	Bulldogs	North Queensland Cowboys	2	21 Oct 2026	
Chelsea Savill	St George Illawarra Dragons (Dev)	York Valkyrie	1	4 Nov 2026	
Mercedez Taulelei-Siala	Newcastle Knights	Canterbury-Bankstown Bulldogs	2	6 Nov 2026	
Brooke Anderson	St George Illawarra Dragons	Cronulla-Sutherland Sharks	2	11 Nov 2026	
Rosie Kelly	North Queensland Cowboys	Canterbury-Bankstown Bulldogs	3	12 Nov 2026	
Chloe Pallisier	Penrith Panthers	St George Illawarra Dragons (Sup)	2	18 Nov 2026	

=== Coaches ===
Coach	2025 club	2026 club
Brett Kimmorley	Wests Tigers	Manly-Warringah Sea Eagles (NSW Cup)

== Results matrix ==
Team	1	2	3	4	5	6	7	8	9	10	11	F1	F2	GF
Brisbane Broncos	**NQL**	CRO	**WTI**	**NEW**	CBY	CAN	**SYD**	GCT	**PAR**	SGI	**NZW**			
Canberra Raiders	SGI	**NZW**	**SYD**	**CRO**	NQL	**BRI**	NEW	CBY	GCT	**PAR**	WTI			
Canterbury-Bankstown Bulldogs	NZW	**GCT**	**CRO**	**SGI**	BRI	**NQL**	PAR	**CAN**	WTI	NEW	SYD			
Cronulla-Sutherland Sharks	**NEW**	**BRI**	CBY	CAN	WTI	**GCT**	NQL	**PAR**	SYD	NZW	**SGI**			
Gold Coast Titans	**SYD**	CBY	**PAR**	NQL	NZW	CRO	**SGI**	**BRI**	**CAN**	WTI	NEW			
Newcastle Knights	CRO	SYD	**SGI**	BRI	PAR	NZW	**CAN**	**WTI**	NQL	**CBY**	**GCT**			
New Zealand Warriors	**CBY**	CAN	**NQL**	PAR	GCT	**NEW**	WTI	SYD	**SGI**	**CRO**	BRI			
North Queensland Cowboys	BRI	**WTI**	NZW	**GCT**	CAN	CBY	**CRO**	SGI	**NEW**	**SYD**	PAR			
Parramatta Eels	**WTI**	SGI	GCT	**NZW**	NEW	SYD	**CBY**	CRO	**BRI**	CAN	**NQL**			
St. George Illawarra Dragons	**CAN**	**PAR**	NEW	CBY	SYD	**WTI**	GCT	**NQL**	NZW	**BRI**	CRO			
Sydney Roosters	**GCT**	**NEW**	CAN	WTI	SGI	**PAR**	BRI	**NZW**	**CRO**	NQL	**CBY**			
Wests Tigers	PAR	NQL	BRI	**SYD**	CRO	SGI	**NZW**	NEW	**CBY**	**GCT**	**CAN**			

Bold – Home game
Italics – Game at a neutral venue
X – Bye
* – Golden point game
Opponent for round listed above margin

== Attendances ==
=== Club figures ===
The table below is divided into stand alone and double header sections to showcase how the different formats impact crowd numbers.
Stand alone

- In 2026, 30 stand alone games have been scheduled for the regular season.
- In 2025, 27 stand alone games were played during the regular season.
  - A further 4 stand alone games were played in the 2025 final series. The table below excludes the crowd numbers for these 4 matches.

Double-header

- In 2026, all 30 double-headers have the NRLW game played first, with the NRL game played second.
- In 2025, 28 double-headers had the NRLW game played first, with the NRL game played second.
- In 2025, 5 of the double-headers had the NRLW game played second.
  - All five instances of this format occurred on a Sunday with the NRL kicking off at or just after 4:00 PM and the NRLW game kicking off at or just after 6:15 PM.
  - By the NRL's own figures, on all five occasions more than 79% of the NRL crowd left the venue after the men's game concluded.
  - This game-day format was dropped for the 2026 season.

Magic round

- The figures below do not include the NRLW Magic Round.

Team	Stand Alone							NRLW-NRL Double Headers						
Team	Games	Total	Averages		Diff	Low	High	Games	Total	Averages		Diff	Low	High
Team	Games	Total	2026	2025	Diff	Low	High	Games	Total	2026	2025	Diff	Low	High
Brisbane Broncos	3	6,139	2,046	1,761	+285	1,884	2,238	2	25,199	12,600	12,812	-212	10,828	14,371
Canberra Raiders	2	3,560	1,780	1,646	+134	1,646	1,914	3	13,365	4,455	10,184	-5,729	4,000	5,305
Canterbury-Bankstown Bulldogs	2	1,110	555	2,535	-1,980	545	565	2	16,659	8,330	11,769	-3,439	8,010	8,649
Cronulla-Sutherland Sharks	4	6,058	1,515	1,409	+106	1,128	2,109	1	1,865	1,865	2,617	-752	1,865	1,865
Gold Coast Titans	2	2,387	1,194	828	+366	1,007	1,380	3	18,505	6,168	7,169	-1,001	4,230	7,893
Newcastle Knights	3	6,029	2,010	2,054	-44	1,897	2,146	1	8,461	8,461	15,935	-7,474	8,461	8,461
New Zealand Warriors	2	11,114	5,557	6,292	-735	4,928	6,186	3	34,840	11,613	10,030	+1,583	9,525	12,704
North Queensland Cowboys	2	3,339	1,670	1,355	+315	1,230	2,109	3	18,978	6,326	7,804	-1,478	3,416	10,093
Parramatta Eels	2	1,394	697	711	-14	622	772	2	15,294	7,647	9,128	-1,481	7,547	7,747
St George Illawarra Dragons	1	1,801	1,801	1,864	-63	1,801	1,801	3	9,029	3,010	4,981	-1,971	1,756	3,642
Sydney Roosters	2	2,867	1,434	1,644	-210	851	2,016	3	23,140	7,713	8,925	-1,212	6,950	8,971
Wests Tigers	4	4,536	1,134	1,380	-246	834	1,630	1	2,733	2,733	2,772	-39	2,733	2,733

Notes
- As of 15 September 2026
- 2026 tallies are missing the following four matches. All four are double headers. For these matches a crowd number has not yet been recorded in the respective Match Centre on the NRL website.
  - Round 4 Bulldogs v Dragons at Accor Stadium
  - Round 6 Dragons v Tigers at St George Venues Jubilee Stadium
  - Round 7 Eels v Bulldogs at CommBank Stadium
  - Round 7 Knights v Raiders at McDonald Jones Stadium
