= 2019 Women's State of Origin =

Australian sporting competition

New South Wales	Queensland
14	4
	1	2	Total
NSW	0	14	14
QLD	4	0	4
- Date: 21 June 2019
- Stadium: North Sydney Oval
- Location: Sydney, New South Wales, Australia
- Nellie Doherty Medal: Maddie Studdon
- Referees: Grant Atkins, Belinda Sharpe
- Attendance: 10,515

Broadcast partners
- Broadcasters: Nine Network (Live) Fox League (Live)

The 2019 Women's State of Origin was the second State of Origin rugby league match between the New South Wales and Queensland women's teams played at North Sydney Oval on 21 June 2019. The match was the second played under the State of Origin banner.

New South Wales defeated Queensland 14–4, extending their winning streak over their rivals to four games. New South Wales halfback Maddie Studdon was awarded the Nellie Doherty Medal for Player of the Match.

== Background ==
On 22 May 2019, North Sydney Oval was announced as the venue for the 2019 Women's State of Origin, hosting the game for the second consecutive season. Also announced was the first under-18 Women's State of Origin game, which would take place as a curtain-raiser to the senior game.

== Match summary ==
Friday, 21 June
7:40 pm (AEDT)

New South Wales	14 – 4	Queensland
Tries: 3 Jessica Sergis 38'; Shakiah Tungai 44'; Maddie Studdon 50'; Goals: 1 Kirra Dibb (1/2) 51'	1st: 0–4; 2nd: 14–0; Highlights; Match Stats (NRL); Report	Tries: 1 Tazmin Gray 24'

North Sydney Oval
Attendance: 10,515
Nellie Doherty Medal: Maddie Studdon
Referee: Grant Atkins, Belinda Sharpe

== Teams ==
New South Wales	Position	Queensland
Corban McGregor	Fullback	Chelsea Baker
Jessica Sergis	Wing	Karina Brown
Tiana Penitani	Centre	Stephanie Mooka
Isabelle Kelly	Centre	Amber Pilley
Shakiah Tungai	Wing	Meg Ward
Kirra Dibb	Five-Eighth	Ali Brigginshaw (c)
Maddie Studdon	Halfback	Jenni-Sue Hoepper
Simaima Taufa	Prop	Heather Ballinger
Kylie Hilder	Hooker	Brittany Breayley
Millie Boyle	Prop	Rona Peters
Kezie Apps (c)	2nd Row	Tazmin Gray
Shontelle Stowers	2nd Row	Tallisha Harden
Hannah Southwell	Lock	Annette Brander
Vanessa Foliaki	Interchange	Steph Hancock
Botille Vette-Welsh	Interchange	Amy Turner
Holli Wheeler	Interchange	Chelsea Lenarduzzi
Takilele Katoa	Interchange	Jessika Elliston
Andy Patmore	Coach	Jason Hetherington

== Under-18s ==
The Under-18 Women's State of Origin was played as a curtain-raiser to the senior Women's State of Origin match. New South Wales defeated Queensland 24–4 in the inaugural game at North Sydney Oval, with Blues' second-row Caitlan Johnston named Player of the Match. The game was livestreamed on NRL.com.

=== U18s Match summary ===
Friday, 21 June
5:45 pm (AEDT)

New South Wales	24 – 4	Queensland
Tries: 4 Teagan Berry 8', 32'; Olivia Kernick 17'; Caitlan Johnston 46'; Goals: 4 Emily Curtain (4/4) 10', 19', 34', 47'	1st: 12–0; 2nd: 12–4; Report	Tries: 1 Courtney Tamati 39'

North Sydney Oval
Attendance:
Player of the Match: Caitlan Johnston
Referee: Tom Cambourn

=== Teams ===
New South Wales	Position	Queensland
Tess Staines	Fullback	China Polata
Teagan Berry	Wing	Jasmine Peters
Jaime Chapman	Centre	Tyesha Mikaio
Mikayla Kidd	Centre	Chante Temara
Zali Fay	Wing	Rosemary Vaimili-Toalepai
Emily Curtain	Five-Eighth	Rhiannon Revell-Blair
Tiana Graham	Halfback	Courtney Tamati
Maddison Weatherall (c)	Prop	Jessikah Reeves
Janaya Bent	Hooker	Emma Manzelmann
Filomina Hanisi	Prop	Lyllian Mikaio (c)
Olivia Kernick	2nd Row	Keilee Joseph
Caitlan Johnston	2nd Row	Jasmon Tupou
Mareva Swann	Lock	Nakita Sao
Rhiannon Tungai	Interchange	Acacia Wulf
Eleni Amone	Interchange	River Smalley
Sophie Curtain	Interchange	Tiamo Williams
Joeli Morris	Interchange	Keisharn Hala
Daniel Lacey	Coach	Ben Jeffries
