= Taliah Fuimaono =

Australia & Samoa international rugby league footballer (born 1999)

Personal information
- Born: 11 May 1999 (age 27) Penrith, New South Wales, Australia
- Height: 171 cm (5 ft 7 in)
- Weight: 73 kg (11 st 7 lb)

Playing information
- Position: Five-eighth, Hooker, Centre
Club
Years	Team	Pld	T	G	FG	P
2021–22	St George Illawarra Dragons	13	1	0	0	4
2023–25	Gold Coast Titans	16	3	0	0	12
2026–	St George Illawarra Dragons	7	2	0	0	8
	Total	36	6	0	0	24
Representative
Years	Team	Pld	T	G	FG	P
2019–26	Samoa	4	0	0	0	0
2021–26	Indigenous All Stars	6	0	0	0	0
2022	Australia	3	1	0	0	4
2023–24	New South Wales	5	0	0	0	0
- Source: As of 31 October 2026

Taliah Fuimaono (born 11 May 1999) is an Australian rugby league football player who plays as a five-eighth for the St. George Illawarra Dragons in the NRL Women’s Premiership (NRLW). She has played for the St. George Illawarra Dragons and the Gold Coast Titans.

Taliah has represented Samoa and Australia internationally and has played for New South Wales in the State of Origin series. She has also represented the Indigenous All Stars.

== Personal life ==
Fuimaono was born in Penrith, New South Wales and is of Indigenous Australian and Samoan descent.

== Career ==
Fuimaono played her junior rugby league with the St. Clair Comets.

=== 2019 ===
Fuimaono was selected to make her test debut for Samoa against New Zealand as a halfback. Samoa lost the test 46–8 at Mount Smart Stadium.

=== 2022 ===
Fuimaono debuted in the Indigenous All Stars game against the Māori All Stars, playing off the bench in the 18–8 victory at CommBank Stadium.

Fuimaono signed with the St. George Illawarra Dragons for the delayed 2021 NRL Women's Premiership (which was postponed until 2022 due to the COVID-19 pandemic). She and her older brother, Tyrell Fuimaono, became the first brother and sister to represent the same club. She debuted for the Dragons on the 27th February, 2022 in a 20–12 win over the Gold Coast Titans at McDonald Jones Stadium. She played all seven games in the St. George Illawarra Dragons' run to the 2021 Grand Final, in all of which she played at five-eighth, including the 16-4 Grand Final loss to the Sydney Roosters at Moreton Daily Stadium.

At the RLPA Player Awards for the 2021 season, she was named RLPA five-eighth of the year, along with several of her St. George Illawarra Dragons teammates: Emma Tonegato, Jaime Chapman, Teagan Berry, Rachael Pearson and Elsie Albert. In July 2022, the Dragons finalized their squad for the season, retaining Fuimaono on the Team. In the 2022 season, she started at five-eighth in the season-opening 26–12 win over the Gold Coast Titans at the WIN Stadium. She would go on to play five-eighth, centers, and lock.

She scored her first NRLW try in Round 5 of the 2022 season, playing in the centers in the St George Illawarra Dragons' 30–8 loss to eventual premiers the Newcastle Knights at Central Coast Stadium. In October, she was selected in the Australia squad for the 2021 Women's Rugby League World Cup in the United Kingdom.

On 2 November 2022, she made her debut for the Australian National Team in the Rugby World Cup match against the Cook Islands, scoring a try in the 74–0 shutout at LNER Community Stadium in York. She came off the bench in jersey number 19. She played two more games in the tournament in the position of five-eighth, first in the 92-0 shutout against France and then in the 82-0 semi-final won over Papua New Guinea.

=== 2023 ===
On 5 April 2023, she signed with the Gold Coast Titans on a three-year deal after being unsigned by the St George Illawarra Dragons. In May, she was selected to make her Origin debut for New South Wales against Queensland in Game 1 of the 2023 series, which saw New South Wales suffer an 18–10 loss at the CommBank Stadium. In the second game of the 2023 series, she played five-eighth, partnering Jesse Southwell in the halves. New South Wales won the match 18–14 at Queensland Country Bank Stadium.

On 2 July 2023, in the opening game of the 2023 NRL Women's Premiership season, Fuimaono made her debut for the Gold Coast Titans in a 16–6 win over the other debutants, the North Queensland Cowboys. She sustained an Achilles' tendon injury during the game, causing her to miss the remaining season. By the end of the regular season, she had recovered from her injury. Because the Titans finished in third place and qualified for the finals, coach Karyn Murphy was reluctant to make any changes to the team.

The Titans went on to play in the 2023 Grand Final, with Fuimaono's teammate, Jaime Chapman, scoring a hat-trick; but they lost against the defending premiers, the Newcastle Knights, 24–18 at Accor Stadium.

=== 2024 ===
Fuimaono retained her spot in the New South Wales team for Game 1 of the 2024 series, which kicked off the NRL Magic Round at Suncorp Stadium in Brisbane. She played off the bench in a utility role, where the Sky Blues won 22–12. She retained her spot for the next two games, both on the interchange bench, which New South Wales won 11–10 on a wet night at McDonald Jones Stadium in Newcastle, and therefore lost the series after successive defeats. They lost 22–6 in the decider at Queensland Country Bank Stadium in Townsville.

She made her return for the Gold Coast Titans in the 2024 season opened against her former club, the St. George Illawarra Dragons, winning 18–10 at WIN Stadium in Wollongong. She went on to play six more games that season, bringing her total to seven appearances, and scored a try in the Gold Coast Titans' final game of the season in a 16–12 loss to the Canberra Raiders at CommBank Stadium.

=== 2025 ===
For the 2025 season, she was preparing for her third season with the Gold Coast Titans, playing in eight matches, and playing a part in wins over the St. George Illawarra Dragons and Parramatta Eels and scoring a try in the game that secured a finals berth, pipping the Canberra Raiders in golden point 17–16 in the final round of the regular season at Cbus Super Stadium. She got recalled to the Samoan team for the Pacific Championships tournament against Australia and New Zealand. She played five-eighth in both games against New Zealand at Go Media Stadium, which Samoa led 20–0 at halftime before New Zealand overcame them in the second half to win 22–20. In the game against Australia at Suncorp Stadium in Brisbane, Australia had a 60-0 shutout.

On 5 November 2025, she signed a two-year deal to return to the St. George Illawarra Dragons.
