= Margot Vella =

Australian dual-code rugby player

Personal information
- Born: 11 April 1999 (age 27) Campbelltown, New South Wales, Australia
- Height: 161 cm (5 ft 3 in)
- Weight: 63 kg (9 st 13 lb)

Playing information

Rugby union
Club
Years	Team	Pld	T	G	FG	P
20??–22	NSW Waratahs

Rugby league
- Position: Wing, Centre
Club
Years	Team	Pld	T	G	FG	P
2023–25	St George Illawarra	15	9	0	0	36
2026–	Nth Qld Cowboys	11	5	0	0	20
	Total	26	14	0	0	56
- Source: As of 1 November 2026

Margot Vella (born 11 April 1999) is an Australian dual-code rugby footballer who plays for the North Queensland Cowboys.

She previously played for the St George Illawarra Dragons in the NRL Women's Premiership (NRLW) and for the NSW Waratahs in the Super W.

== Background ==
Vella was born in Campbelltown, a suburb of Sydney, New South Wales. She is of Maltese descent. She attended St Patrick's College, Campbelltown, before moving to the United States in 2018 to play college rugby union for Quinnipiac University in Hamden, Connecticut.

== Rugby league career ==
=== 2023 ===
On 29 July 2023, Vella scored two tries on her NRLW debut for the Dragons, recording a 38–12 victory over the Parramatta Eels. In August, Vella scored the match winning try in the Dragons round five win over the Wests Tigers at CommBank Stadium. She ended her first season with five tries from eight appearances.

=== 2026 ===
After three seasons with the Dragons, Vella joined the North Queensland Cowboys for the 2026 NRL Women's season as a replacement player.

In Round 1 of the 2026 NRL Women's season, she made her debut for the Cowboys in a loss to the Brisbane Broncos.
