= St. George Illawarra Dragons Women =

Australian professional rugby league club, based in Wollongong & Kogarah, NSW

St. George Illawarra Dragons
Club information
- Full name: St. George Illawarra Dragons Rugby League Football Club
- Nickname(s): Dragons, Saints, Red V
- Colours: White; Red
- Founded: Team: 9 September 2018; 8 years ago Club: 23 September 1998; 28 years ago
- Website: dragons.com.au

Current details
- Grounds: WIN Stadium, Wollongong (23,000); Netstrata Jubilee Stadium, Kogarah (20,500)
- CEO: Tim Watsford
- Chairman: Andrew Lancaster
- Coach: Nathan Cross
- Captain: Vacant
- Competition: National Rugby League
- 2025 season: 10th
- Current season

Uniforms
Home colours	Away colours

Records
- Premierships: 0
- Runners-up: 2 (2019, 2021)
- Minor premierships: 0
- NRL Nines: 1 (2020)
- Biggest win: Dragons 40 – 4 Knights; McDonald Jones Stadium (20 Mar 2022)
- Biggest loss: Dragons 0 – 38 Knights; McDonald Jones Stadium (19 Jul 2026)
- First game: Dragons 4 – 30 Broncos; Suncorp Stadium (9 Sep 2018)
- Wooden spoons: 3 (2018, 2020, 2026)
- Most capped: 52 – Teagan Berry
- Highest try scorer: 40 – Teagan Berry
- Highest points scorer: 162 – Teagan Berry

St. George Illawarra Dragons Women are a rugby league team, representing both the Illawarra and St George regions of New South Wales. The team is part of the St. George Illawarra Dragons club and plays in the National Rugby League Women's Premiership.

== Seasons ==
Season	Regular season								Finals		Nines	Ref
Season	P	W	D	L	F	A	Pts	Pos	Top	Placing	Nines	Ref
2018	3	1	0	2	26	66	2	4th	2	—	—	
2019	3	2	0	1	54	36	4	2nd	2	Lost in Grand Final	—	
2020	3	0	0	3	18	58	0	4th	2	—	Won	
2021	5	4	0	1	104	48	8	2nd	4	Lost in Grand Final	—	
2022	5	3	0	2	75	104	6	3rd	4	Lost in semi-final	—	
2023	9	3	0	6	182	210	6	7th	4	—	—	
2024	9	2	0	7	178	234	4	9th	4	—	—	
2025	11	3	0	8	164	242	6	10th	6	—	—	
2026	11	2	0	9	138	264	4	12th	6	—	—	

=== 2026 draw ===
The draw for the 2026 season was announced on 14 November 2025.

Round	Opponent	Score	Date	Time	Venue	
1	Raiders	4–20	Sat 4 Jul 2026	3:15 PM	Home	Jubilee Stadium
2	Eels	22–8	Sun 12 Jul 2026	1:45 PM	Home	WIN Stadium
3	Knights	0–38	Sun 19 Jul 2026	6:15 PM	Away	McDonald Jones Stadium
4	Bulldogs	8–22	Sat 25 Jul 2026	3:15 PM	Away	Accor Stadium
5	Roosters	8–38	Sat 1 Aug 2026	2:15 PM	Neutral	Geohex Stadium, Wagga Wagga
6	Tigers	12–16	Sun 9 Aug 2026	1:35 PM	Home	Jubilee Stadium
7	Titans	10–26	Sat 15 Aug 2026	12:45 PM	Away	Cbus Super Stadium
8	Cowboys	28–32	Sat 22 Aug 2026	5:15 PM	Home	Allianz Stadium
9	Warriors	22–18	Sun 30 Aug 2026	11:50 AM	Away	Go Media Stadium
10	Broncos	16–24	Sun 6 Sep 2026	11:50 AM	Home	WIN Stadium
11	Sharks	8–16	Sat 12 Sep 2026	5:10 PM	Away	Allianz Stadium

== Head-to-head records ==
Opponent	First meeting	P	W	D	L	PF	PA	Win %	Share
Broncos	9 Sep 2018	10	1	0	9	103	276	10.00%	27.18%
Warriors	15 Sep 2018	5	4	0	1	106	74	80.00%	58.89%
Roosters	22 Sep 2018	10	2	0	8	80	240	20.00%	25.00%
Titans	27 Feb 2022	7	3	0	4	116	131	42.86%	46.96%
Eels	6 Mar 2022	6	5	0	1	138	56	83.33%	71.13%
Knights	20 Mar 2022	7	2	0	5	110	174	28.57%	38.73%
Raiders	29 Jul 2023	4	1	0	3	92	91	25.00%	50.27%
Tigers	19 Aug 2023	4	1	0	3	58	64	25.00%	47.54%
Cowboys	2 Sep 2023	4	1	0	3	124	128	25.00%	49.21%
Sharks	7 Sep 2023	4	0	0	4	26	80	0.00%	24.53%
Bulldogs	19 Jul 2025	2	1	0	1	26	42	50.00%	38.24%
Totals	9 Sep 2018	63	21	0	42	979	1356	33.33%	41.93%

Notes

- Share % is the percentage of points For over the sum of points For and Against.
- Clubs listed in the order than the Dragons Women first played them.
- As of 15 September 2026

== Coaches ==
In October 2021, the club announced that Jamie Soward would coach the Dragons Women in the 2021 season. In August 2023, the club extended his tenure for a further two years. In September 2024, Soward was told he would not be needed for the 2025 season. Nathan Cross was appointed as his successor in December 2024; he was previously the Queensland Women's assistant coach. As of 15 September 2026

Coach	Season span	M	W	D	L	For	Agst	Win %	Share %
Daniel Lacey	2018–2020	10	3	0	7	104	190	30.00%	35.37%
Jamie Soward	2021–2024	31	13	0	18	573	660	41.94%	46.47%
Nathan Cross	2025–present	22	5	0	17	302	506	22.73%	37.38%

== Captains ==
All players who have captained the St. George Illawarra Dragons Women's team in NRLW matches.
As of 15 September 2026

C#	Name	Years as Captain	Debut		Games as Captain			Games for Club	Ref
C#	Name	Years as Captain	Date	Round	Solo	Joint	Total	Games for Club	Ref
1	Sam Bremner	2018–2020	9 Sep 2018	1	2	2	4	4	
2	Kezie Apps	2018–2022	15 Sep 2018	2	15	2	17	19	
3	Keeley Nizza	2021–2022	6 Mar 2022	2	3	0	3	23	
4	Holli Wheeler	2022	18 Sep 2022	5	0	0	0	20	
5	Raecene McGregor	2023–2025	22 Jul 2023	1	18	7	25	28	
6	Zali Hopkins	2025	5 Jul 2025	1	4	7	11	38	
7	Brooke Anderson	2026	4 Jul 2026	1	11	0	11	11	

== Current squad ==
The team is coached by Nathan Cross. Jersey numbers in the table reflect the team list announced for Round 11.
Table last updated on 13 September 2026.

J#	Player	Age	Position(s)	NRLW seasons				NRLW stats					Origin	Tests	All Stars
J#	Player	Age	Position(s)	Debut	2018-24	2025	2026	M	T	G	Pts	Prems	Origin	Tests	All Stars
1	Teagan Berry	24	Fullback, Wing	2020	32	9	11	52	40	1	162	—	3	—	—
2	Maria Paseka	20	Wing	2024	1	4	10	15	6	6	36	—	—	2	—
3	Tyra Ekepati	18	Centre, Wing	2025	—	5	8	13	3	0	12	—	—	—	—
4	Tahlia O'Brien	18	Centre, Second-row	2025	—	3	10	13	3	0	12	—	—	—	—
5	Shenae Ciesiolka	29	Wing, Centre	2020	32	8	10	50	19	0	76	2	13	3	—
6	Zali Hopkins	24	Five-eighth, Hooker	2022	19	11	8	38	5	0	20	—	—	—	—
7	Kasey Reh	20	Halfback, Five-eighth	2024	9	10	11	30	5	0	20	—	—	—	—
8	Amelia Huakau	31	Prop, Lock	2020	1 9	11	9	30	1	0	4	—	—	4	—
9	Brooke Anderson	30	Hooker, Lock	2022	5 20	12	11	48	5	0	20	—	1	9	2
10	Ruby-Jean Kennard-Ellis	23	Prop	2022	14	1	11	26	4	0	16	—	—	—	—
11	Montana Clifford	22	Second-row	2024	4	7	11	22	0	0	0	—	—	—	—
12	Ella Koster	21	Second-row, Lock	2023	14	10	11	35	9	0	36	—	—	—	2
13	Hannah Southwell	27	Lock, Prop	2018	3 13 19	9	11	55	4	3	22	1 2	5	2	—
14	Tori Shipton	18	Hooker	2025	—	6	8	14	2	0	8	—	—	—	—
18	Ahlivia Ingram	25	Prop	2023	2	9	6	17	0	0	0	—	—	—	1
16	Trinity Tauaneai	18	Lock, Prop	2025	—	9	10	19	1	0	4	—	—	—	—
17	Keele Browne	24	Centre, Wing	2021	23	11	5	39	6	0	24	—	—	—	—
18	Nita Maynard-Perrin	34	Hooker	2018	11 4 3 19	8	4	49	1	0	4	1	1	15	2
19	Jayme Millard	23	Wing, Centre	2025	—	8	8	16	7	10	48	—	—	—	—
20	Taliah Fuimaono	27	Five-eighth, Hooker	2021	13 8	8	7	36	6	0	24	—	5	3 3	6
21	Lavinia Kitai	22	Prop	2025	—	11	1	12	0	0	0	—	—	7	—
22	Sara Sautia	24	Second-row	2021	9 6	2	—	17	1	0	4	—	—	—	—
–	Montaya Hudson	20	Fullback	—	—	R	—	0	0	0	0	—	—	—	—
–	Arabella McKenzie	27	Five-eighth	—	—	RU	—	0	0	0	0	—	—	—	—
–	Charis Toli	18	Centre	—	—	R	—	0	0	0	0	—	—	—	—
DV	Ella Churchill	17	Centre, Wing	—	—	R	—	0	0	0	0	—	—	—	—
DV	Chelsea Savill	21	Hooker	2024	3	6	—	9	0	0	0	—	—	—	—
DV	Paige Tauaneai	18	Second-row	—	—	R	—	0	0	0	0	—	—	—	—
S	Seriah Palepale	18	Prop	2026	—	R	1	1	0	0	0	—	—	—	—
Z	Skye Spencer	18	Five-eighth	—	—	R	—	0	0	0	0	—	—	—	—
–	Danii Gray	19	Hooker	—	—	D	—	0	0	0	0	—	—	—	—
–	Mackenzie Lear	22	Prop	—	—	R	—	0	0	0	0	—	—	—	—
DV	Halle Barrett	17	Centre	—	—	—	—	0	0	0	0	—	—	—	—
IS	Madison Mulhall	22	Prop, Second-row	2023	10	11	4	25	2	0	8	—	—	—	—
IS	Bronte Wilson	20	Prop	2024	4	9	H	13	1	0	4	—	—	1	—

Notes:

- Amelia Huakau and Ruby-Jean Kennard Ellis have each been signed on a supplementary contact for 2026.
- The following players have been signed on a development contract for 2026:
  - Ella Churchill
  - Chelsea Savill
  - Skye Spencer
  - Paige Tauaneai
  - Charis Toli
- Halle Barrett was signed on a development contract for 2027.
- Supplementary contract player Ruby-Jean Kennard Ellis was named as a starting prop in Round 1.
- The following players were signed on a development contract for 2025:
  - Tahlia O'Brien
  - Maria Paseka
  - Seriah Palepale
  - Paige Tauaneai

The Dragons announced contract extensions in several instalments from July 2025. The Dragons announced player signings in several instalments from April 2025.

=== Players in ===
- Emma Verran from Sharks
- Alexis Tauaneai from Bulldogs
- Angelina Teakaraanga-Katoa from Bulldogs

Promotion

- Halle Barrett (Dev)

=== Players extended ===
- Keele Browne (2028)

=== Players out ===
- Tori Shipton to Knights
- Teagan Berry to Sharks
- Zali Hopkins to Cowboys

Released

- Nita Maynard-Perrin
- Jayme Millard
- Sara Sautia
- Brooke Anderson

Off contract

- Ahlivia Ingram
- Arabella McKenzie
- Seriah Palepale
- Maria Paseka
- Kasey Reh
- Bronte Wilson
- Amelia Huakau (Sup)
- Ruby-Jean Kennard-Ellis (Sup)
- Tahlia O'Brien (Rpl)

== Club records ==
Win-loss record since entering the NRLW in 2018:

Games	Wins	Drawn	Loss	Points for	Points against	+/-	Win %
63	21	0	42	979	1,356	–377	33.33%

=== Player records ===
Lists and tables last updated: 15 September 2026.

==== Career records (at the Dragons) ====
===== Most games for the Dragons =====
Qualification: 20 games

Rank	Player	Span	Games
1	Teagan Berry	2020–present	52
2	Keele Browne	2021–present	39
3	Zali Hopkins	2022–present	38
4	Ella Koster	2023–present	35
5	Kasey Reh	2024–present	30
6	Shenai Lendill	2023–2025	29
7	Raecene McGregor	2018–2025	28
8	Madison Mulhall	2023–present	25
9	Keeley Nizza	2018–2022	23
9	Hannah Southwell	2018–present	23
11	Holli Wheeler	2018–2022	20
11	Taliah Fuimaono	2021–2023, 2026–present	20
11	Jamilee McGregor	2023–2025	20

===== Most points for the Dragons =====
Qualification: 20 points

Rank	Player	2026 club	M	T	G	FG	Points
1	Teagan Berry		52	40	1	0	162
2	Raecene McGregor		28	1	45	0	94
3	Jayme Millard		16	7	10	0	48
4	Rachael Pearson		12	1	20	1	45
5	Ella Koster		35	9	0	0	36
5	Margot Vella		15	9	0	0	36
5	Maria Paseka		15	6	6	0	36
8	Keele Browne		39	6	0	0	24
8	Madison Bartlett		6	6	0	0	24
10	Jessica Sergis		10	5	0	0	20
10	Emma Verran		13	5	0	0	20
10	Zali Hopkins		38	5	0	0	20
10	Tyla King		13	3	4	0	20
10	Kasey Reh		30	5	0	0	20
10	Kimberley Hunt	R	4	5	0	0	20

===== Most tries for the Dragons =====
Qualification: 5 tries

Rank	Player	Tries
1	Teagan Berry	40
2	Ella Koster	9
2	Margot Vella	9
4	Jayme Millard	7
5	Keele Browne	6
5	Madison Bartlett	6
5	Maria Paseka	6
8	Jessica Sergis	5
8	Emma Verran	5
8	Zali Hopkins	5
8	Kasey Reh	5
8	Kimberley Hunt	5

===== Most goals for the Dragons =====
All goal kickers

Rank	Player	Goals
1	Raecene McGregor	45
2	Rachael Pearson	20
3	Jayme Millard	10
4	Maddie Studdon	9
5	Maria Paseka	6
6	Tyla King	4
7	Shakiah Tungai	3
8	Holli Wheeler	2
9	Teagan Berry	1

===== Most field goals for the Dragons =====
One instance to date

Rank	Player	Field goals
1	Rachael Pearson	1

==== Season records ====
Season length has increased over time as the competition has expanded.

===== Most points in a season for the Dragons =====
Qualification: 16 points

Rank	Player	Season	M	T	G	FG	Points
1	Teagan Berry	2023	9	11	0	0	44
2	Raecene McGregor	2024	9	0	19	0	38
3	Teagan Berry	2024	9	8	0	0	32
3	Teagan Berry	2025	9	8	0	0	32
5	Jayme Millard	2026	8	6	3	0	30
6	Rachael Pearson	2021	6	1	12	0	28
6	Raecene McGregor	2023	9	0	14	0	28
6	Raecene McGregor	2025	7	1	12	0	28
9	Madison Bartlett	2021	6	6	0	0	24
9	Maria Paseka	2026	10	3	6	0	24
11	Teagan Berry	2022	6	5	0	0	20
11	Tyla King	2023	9	3	4	0	20
11	Margot Vella	2023	8	5	0	0	20
11	Kimberley Hunt	2024	4	5	0	0	20
15	Jayme Millard	2025	8	1	7	0	18
16	Rachael Pearson	2022	6	0	8	1	17
17	Maddie Studdon	2019	4	0	8	0	16
17	Teagan Berry	2021	7	4	0	0	16
17	Emma Verran	2021	7	4	0	0	16

===== Most tries in a season for the Dragons =====
Qualification: 4 tries

Rank	Player	Season	M	Tries
1	Teagan Berry	2023	9	11
2	Teagan Berry	2024	9	8
2	Teagan Berry	2025	9	8
4	Madison Bartlett	2021	6	6
4	Jayme Millard	2026	8	6
6	Teagan Berry	2022	6	5
6	Margot Vella	2023	8	5
6	Kimberley Hunt	2024	4	5
9	Teagan Berry	2021	7	4
9	Emma Verran	2021	7	4
9	Ruby-Jean Kennard-Ellis	2026	11	4

==== Match records ====
===== Most points in a game for the Dragons =====
Qualification: 10 points

Rank	Player	Date	Opponent	Venue	T	G	FG	Points
1	Teagan Berry	26 Aug 2023	Titans	Netstrata Jubilee Stadium	4	0	0	16
1	Raecene McGregor	5 Jul 2025	Raiders	GIO Stadium	1	6	0	16
3	Raecene McGregor	2 Sep 2023	Cowboys	Queensland Country Bank Stadium	0	6	0	12
4	Rachael Pearson	6 Mar 2022	Eels	WIN Stadium	1	3	0	10
4	Shakiah Tungai	15 Sep 2018	Warriors	ANZ Stadium	1	3	0	10
4	Tyla King	29 Jul 2023	Eels	WIN Stadium	1	3	0	10
4	Raecene McGregor	4 Aug 2024	Cowboys	Queensland Country Bank Stadium	0	5	0	10
4	Raecene McGregor	31 Aug 2024	Eels	CommBank Stadium	0	5	0	10
4	Raecene McGregor	7 Sep 2024	Raiders	Netstrata Jubilee Stadium	0	5	0	10
4	Jayme Millard	30 Aug 2025	Warriors	Jubilee Stadium	1	3	0	10

===== Most tries in a game for the Dragons =====
Qualification: 2 tries

Rank	Player	Date	Opponent	Venue	Tries
1	Teagan Berry	26 Aug 2023	Titans	Netstrata Jubilee Stadium	4
2	Jessica Sergis	29 Sep 2019	Roosters	Leichhardt Oval	2
2	Teagan Berry	27 Feb 2022	Titans	McDonald Jones Stadium	2
2	Madison Bartlett	20 Mar 2022	Knights	McDonald Jones Stadium	2
2	Teagan Berry	20 Mar 2022	Knights	McDonald Jones Stadium	2
2	Jaime Chapman	20 Mar 2022	Knights	McDonald Jones Stadium	2
2	Emma Verran	20 Mar 2022	Knights	McDonald Jones Stadium	2
2	Teagan Berry	21 Aug 2022	Titans	WIN Stadium	2
2	Page McGregor	28 Aug 2022	Eels	CommBank Stadium	2
2	Teagan Berry	22 Jul 2023	Knights	McDonald Jones Stadium	2
2	Teagan Berry	29 Jul 2023	Eels	WIN Stadium	2
2	Cortez Te Pou	29 Jul 2023	Eels	WIN Stadium	2
2	Margot Vella	29 Jul 2023	Eels	WIN Stadium	2
2	Taylor-Adeline Mapusua	2 Sep 2023	Cowboys	Queensland Country Bank Stadium	2
2	Margot Vella	4 Aug 2024	Cowboys	Queensland Country Bank Stadium	2
2	Kimberley Hunt	11 Aug 2024	Knights	McDonald Jones Stadium	2
2	Teagan Berry	31 Aug 2024	Eels	CommBank Stadium	2
2	Keele Browne	31 Aug 2024	Eels	CommBank Stadium	2
2	Teagan Berry	7 Sep 2024	Raiders	Netstrata Jubilee Stadium	2
2	Alexis Tauaneai	7 Sep 2024	Raiders	Netstrata Jubilee Stadium	2
2	Maatuleio Fotu-Moala	12 Sep 2024	Tigers	Leichhardt Oval	2
2	Indie Bostock	5 Jul 2025	Raiders	GIO Stadium	2
2	Teagan Berry	30 Aug 2025	Warriors	Jubilee Stadium	2
2	Teagan Berry	7 Sep 2025	Cowboys	WIN Stadium	2
2	Jayme Millard	9 Aug 2026	Tigers	St George Venues Jubilee Stadium	2
2	Jayme Millard	30 Aug 2026	Warriors	Go Media Stadium	2
2	Tahlia O'Brien	30 Aug 2026	Warriors	Go Media Stadium	2

===== Most goals in a game for the Dragons =====
Qualification: 4 goals

Rank	Player	Date	Opponent	Venue	Goals
1	Raecene McGregor	2 Sep 2023	Cowboys	Queensland Country Bank Stadium	6
1	Raecene McGregor	5 Jul 2025	Raiders	GIO Stadium	6
3	Raecene McGregor	4 Aug 2024	Cowboys	Queensland Country Bank Stadium	5
3	Raecene McGregor	31 Aug 2024	Eels	CommBank Stadium	5
3	Raecene McGregor	7 Sep 2024	Raiders	Netstrata Jubilee Stadium	5
6	Maddie Studdon	29 Sep 2019	Roosters	Leichhardt Oval	4
6	Rachael Pearson	3 Apr 2022	Titans	Leichhardt Oval	4

==== First try and last try ====
Players who scored the first try and most recent try for the Dragons.

Name	Year	Round	Minute	Opponent
Sam Bremner	2018	1	7'	Broncos
Shenae Ciesiolka	2026	11	66'	Sharks

==== Oldest and youngest players ====
The oldest and youngest players to represent the St. George Illawarra Dragons Women's in first-grade.

Name	Age	Year
Steph Hancock	42 and 196 days	2024
Bronte Wilson	18 and 4 days	2024

=== Margins and streaks ===
Biggest winning margins
Qualification: 10 point margin

Margin	Score	Opponent	Venue	Date	Round
36	40–4	Knights	McDonald Jones Stadium	20 Mar 2022	4
32	48–16	Cowboys	Queensland Country Bank Stadium	2 Sep 2023	7
28	42–14	Eels	CommBank Stadium	31 Aug 2024	6
26	38–12	Eels	WIN Stadium	29 Jul 2023	2
22	36–14	Raiders	GIO Stadium	5 Jul 2025	1
20	26–6	Warriors	Mt Smart Stadium	22 Sep 2019	2
14	26–12	Titans	WIN Stadium	21 Aug 2022	1
14	22–10	Eels	WIN Stadium	12 Jul 2026	2
12	22–10	Warriors	ANZ Stadium	15 Sep 2018	2
10	10–0	Eels	WIN Stadium	6 Mar 2022	2

Biggest losing margins
Qualification: 20 point margin

Margin	Score	Opponent	Venue	Date	Round
38	0–38	Knights	McDonald Jones Stadium	19 Jul 2026	3
34	12–46	Broncos	Netstrata Jubilee Stadium	16 Sep 2023	9
30	0–30	Roosters	Sydney Cricket Ground	3 Aug 2023	3
30	14–44	Broncos	Queensland Country Bank Stadium	21 Sep 2024	9
30	8–38	Roosters	Geohex Park, Wagga Wagga	1 Aug 2026	5
28	6–34	Roosters	Allianz Stadium	2 Sep 2022	3
28	14–42	Cowboys	WIN Stadium	6 Sep 2025	10
26	0–26	Roosters	Allianz Stadium	22 Sep 2018	3
26	4–30	Broncos	Suncorp Stadium	9 Sep 2018	1
24	6–30	Broncos	ANZ Stadium	6 Oct 2019	Grand Final
24	6–30	Knights	Suncorp Stadium	25 Sep 2022	Semi Final
24	6–30	Broncos	WIN Stadium	27 Jul 2025	4
24	4–28	Sharks	WIN Stadium	25 Aug 2024	5
22	8–30	Knights	Central Coast Stadium	18 Sep 2022	5
20	8–28	Roosters	WIN Stadium	18 Aug 2024	4
20	8–28	Bulldogs	Accor Stadium	25 Jul 2026	4

Most consecutive wins

- 3 (20 March 2022 — 3 April 2022)

Most consecutive losses

- 6 (19 July 2026 — 22 August 2026)
- 5 (27 July 2025 — 23 August 2025)
- 4 (6 October 2019 — 17 October 2020)
- 4 (7 September 2023 — 4 August 2024)

Biggest comeback

- Recovered from 10 point deficit to win (twice)
  - Trailed Wests Tigers 6-16 after 51 minutes at CommBank Stadium on August 19, 2023 and won 20-16.
  - Trailed Newcastle Knights 0-10 after 24 minutes at McDonald Jones Stadium on August 11, 2024 and won 18-10.

Worst Collapse

- Surrendered 12 point lead (twice)
  - Led Canberra Raiders 28-16 after 54 minutes at Netstrata Jubilee Stadium on September 7, 2024 and lost 34-38.
  - Led Newcastle Knights 16-4 after 34 minutes at McDonald Jones Stadium on September 14, 2025 and lost 22-30.

First game and first win

Result	Score	Opponent	Venue	Date	Round
Lost	4–30	Brisbane Broncos	Suncorp Stadium	9 Sep 2018	1
Won	22–10	New Zealand Warriors	ANZ Stadium	15 Sep 2018	2

Premiership wins and grand final results

Result	Score	Opponent	Venue	Date
Lost	6–30	Brisbane Broncos	ANZ Stadium	6 Oct 2019
Lost	4–16	Sydney Roosters	Moreton Daily Stadium	10 Apr 2022

== Individual awards ==
=== Club awards ===
Year	Player of the Year	Red V Members' Award	Coach's Award	Emerging Talent	Top Try Scorer	Top Points Scorer	Ref
2018	Holli Wheeler	—	Honey Hireme	—	5 with 1 try each	Shakiah Tungai 10	
2019	Jessica Sergis	—	Botille Vette-Welsh	—	Jessica Sergis 3	Maddie Studdon 16	
2020	Shaylee Bent	—	Keeley Davis	—	4 with 1 try each	Teagan Berry 6	
2021	Elsie Albert and Emma Tonegato	—	Shaylee Bent	—	Madison Bartlett 6	Rachael Pearson 28	
2022	Holli Wheeler	Kezie Apps	Taliah Fuimaono	Tara McGrath-West	Teagan Berry 5	Teagan Berry 20	
2023	Teagan Berry	Teagan Berry	Alexis Tauaneai	Ella Koster	Teagan Berry 11	Teagan Berry 44	
2024	Alexis Tauaneai and Angelina Teakaraanga-Katoa	Teagan Berry	Jamilee Bright	Kasey Reh	Teagan Berry 8	Raecene McGregor 38	
2025	Madison Mulhall	Teagan Berry	Keele Browne	Trinity Tauaneai	Teagan Berry 8	Teagan Berry 32	
2026	Kasey Reh	Teagan Berry	Ella Koster	Tahlia O'Brien	Jayme Millard 6	Jayme Millard 30	

=== Dally M winners ===
Name	Year
Jessica Sergis	2019
Emma Verran	2021

== Attendances ==
As of 15 July 2026

Ground	Game day format	Matches	Aggregate	Average	Highest				
Ground	Game day format	Matches	Aggregate	Average	Crowd	Match details			
Ground	Game day format	Matches	Aggregate	Average	Crowd	Season	Round	Opponent	NRL Opponent
Jubilee Oval	Stand Alone	1	1,023	1,023	1,023	2021	5	Roosters	—
Jubilee Oval	Multiple NRLW	2	3,048	1,524	1,736	2023	9	Broncos	—
Jubilee Oval	NRLW and NRL	5	22,085	4,417	5,829	2025	2	Roosters	Roosters
Jubilee Oval	Total	8	26,156	3,270	5,829	2025	2	Roosters	Roosters
WIN Stadium	Stand Alone	3	5,186	1,729	1,864	2025	4	Broncos	—
WIN Stadium	Multiple NRLW	1	2,079	2,079	2,079	2021	2	Eels	—
WIN Stadium	NRLW and NRL	4	28,775	7,194	10,728	2024	1	Titans	Panthers
WIN Stadium	NRL then NRLW	1	3,741	3,741	3,741	2024	5	Sharks	Sharks
WIN Stadium	Total	9	39,781	4,420	10,728	2024	1	Titans	Panthers

== History ==
In December 2017, the St. George Illawarra Dragons expressed their interest in applying for a licence to participate in the inaugural NRL Women's season. In March 2018, they were awarded one of four licences for the league's inaugural season, to commence in September of the same year.

Daniel Lacey was appointed to coach the side.

In June 2018, Sam Bremner, Kezie Apps and Talesha Quinn were unveiled as the club's first three signings.

The Dragon's first NRLW match was played on Sunday, 9 September 2018 at Suncorp Stadium. Captain Sam Bremner scored the Dragons' first try, in a 30–4 loss to the Brisbane Broncos. The Dragons' first win occurred in their second match, against the New Zealand Warriors on Saturday, 15 September 2018 at ANZ Stadium. The Dragons won by a margin of 22–10, prior to the NRL team's Semi Final.

=== First team ===
The first ever St George Illawarra Dragons team played the Brisbane Broncos on the 9th September 2018 at Suncorp Stadium. The Brisbane Broncos won the match 30-4.

Jersey	Position	Player
1	Fullback	Sam Bremner (c)
2	Wing	Rikeya Horne
3	Centre	Jessica Sergis
4	Centre	Honey Hireme
5	Wing	Shakiah Tungai
17	Five-eighth	Melanie Howard
7	Halfback	Raecene McGregor
16	Prop	Teina Clark
9	Hooker	Anneka Stephens
10	Prop	Asoiva Karpani
11	Second-row	Kezie Apps
12	Second-row	Holli Wheeler
13	Lock	Annette Brander
6	Hooker	Keeley Davis
8	Prop	Oneata Schwalger
15	Lock	Hannah Southwell
18	Prop	Asipau Mafi
	Coach	Daniel Lacey

== Players ==
The following players have appeared in NRL Women's Premiership matches for the Dragons.
As of 15 September 2026

Order	Player	Dragons					First appearance
Order	Player	M	T	G	FG	Pts	Game	Date	Opponent
1	Samantha Bremner	4	1	0	0	4	1	9 Sep 2018	Broncos
2	Rikeya Horne	7	1	0	0	4	1	9 Sep 2018	Broncos
3	Jessica Sergis	10	5	0	0	20	1	9 Sep 2018	Broncos
4	Honey Hireme	3	1	0	0	4	1	9 Sep 2018	Broncos
5	Shakiah Tungai	8	3	3	0	18	1	9 Sep 2018	Broncos
6	Melanie Howard	3	0	0	0	0	1	9 Sep 2018	Broncos
7	Raecene McGregor	28	1	45	0	94	1	9 Sep 2018	Broncos
8	Asoiva Karpani	1	0	0	0	0	1	9 Sep 2018	Broncos
9	Anneka Stephens	3	0	0	0	0	1	9 Sep 2018	Broncos
10	Teina Clark	3	0	0	0	0	1	9 Sep 2018	Broncos
11	Kezie Apps	19	2	0	0	8	1	9 Sep 2018	Broncos
12	Holli Wheeler	20	0	2	0	4	1	9 Sep 2018	Broncos
13	Annette Brander	3	0	0	0	0	1	9 Sep 2018	Broncos
14	Keeley Nizza	23	1	0	0	4	1	9 Sep 2018	Broncos
15	Oneata Schwalger	3	0	0	0	0	1	9 Sep 2018	Broncos
16	Hannah Southwell	23	1	0	0	4	1	9 Sep 2018	Broncos
17	Asipau Mafi	3	0	0	0	0	1	9 Sep 2018	Broncos
18	Talesha O'Neill	2	0	0	0	0	2	15 Sep 2018	Warriors
19	Kate Haren	2	0	0	0	0	2	15 Sep 2018	Warriors
20	Botille Vette-Welsh	4	1	0	0	4	4	15 Sep 2019	Broncos
21	Stephanie Mooka	1	0	0	0	0	4	15 Sep 2019	Broncos
22	Tiana Penitani Gray	6	3	0	0	12	4	15 Sep 2019	Broncos
23	Kimiora Breayley-Nati	1	0	0	0	0	4	15 Sep 2019	Broncos
24	Maddie Studdon	7	0	9	0	18	4	15 Sep 2019	Broncos
25	Teuila Fotu-Moala	1	0	0	0	0	4	15 Sep 2019	Broncos
26	Brittany Breayley-Nati	4	0	0	0	0	4	15 Sep 2019	Broncos
27	Maitua Feterika	4	1	0	0	4	4	15 Sep 2019	Broncos
28	Shaylee Bent	19	2	0	0	8	4	15 Sep 2019	Broncos
29	Takilele Katoa	4	0	0	0	0	4	15 Sep 2019	Broncos
30	Maddison Weatherall	12	1	0	0	4	4	15 Sep 2019	Broncos
31	Ngatokotoru Arakua	4	0	0	0	0	4	15 Sep 2019	Broncos
32	Najvada George	3	0	0	0	0	5	22 Sep 2019	Warriors
33	Aaliayah Fasavalufaamausili	6	1	0	0	4	5	22 Sep 2019	Warriors
34	Isabelle Kelly	2	0	0	0	0	8	3 Oct 2020	Roosters
35	Jaime Chapman	9	3	0	0	12	8	3 Oct 2020	Roosters
36	Stephanie Hancock	10	0	0	0	0	8	3 Oct 2020	Roosters
37	Elsie Albert	15	3	0	0	12	8	3 Oct 2020	Roosters
38	Ellie Johnston	3	0	0	0	0	8	3 Oct 2020	Roosters
39	Christine Pauli	3	0	0	0	0	8	3 Oct 2020	Roosters
40	Talei Holmes	10	0	0	0	0	8	3 Oct 2020	Roosters
41	Mahalia Murphy	3	0	0	0	0	8	3 Oct 2020	Roosters
42	Georgia Page	2	0	0	0	0	9	10 Oct 2020	Broncos
43	Teagan Berry	52	40	1	0	162	10	17 Oct 2020	Warriors
44	Jade Etherden	1	0	0	0	0	10	17 Oct 2020	Warriors
45	Emma Verran	13	5	0	0	20	11	27 Feb 2022	Titans
46	Page McGregor	12	4	0	0	16	11	27 Feb 2022	Titans
47	Madison Bartlett	6	6	0	0	24	11	27 Feb 2022	Titans
48	Taliah Fuimaono	20	3	0	0	12	11	27 Feb 2022	Titans
49	Rachael Pearson	12	1	20	1	45	11	27 Feb 2022	Titans
50	Quincy Dodd	13	2	0	0	8	11	27 Feb 2022	Titans
51	Kody House	6	1	0	0	4	11	27 Feb 2022	Titans
52	Tegan Dymock	6	0	0	0	0	11	27 Feb 2022	Titans
53	Janelle Williams	4	0	0	0	0	11	27 Feb 2022	Titans
54	Keele Browne	39	6	0	0	24	12	6 Mar 2022	Eels
55	Aliti Namoce	5	0	0	0	0	12	6 Mar 2022	Eels
56	Renee Targett	15	0	0	0	0	12	6 Mar 2022	Eels
57	Chantel Tugaga	3	0	0	0	0	13	13 Mar 2022	Broncos
58	Alexandra Sulusi	1	0	0	0	0	14	20 Mar 2022	Knights
59	Andie Robinson	5	1	0	0	4	18	21 Aug 2022	Titans
60	Monalisa Soliola	5	1	0	0	4	18	21 Aug 2022	Titans
61	Tara McGrath-West	13	0	0	0	0	18	21 Aug 2022	Titans
62	Cassie Staples	1	0	0	0	0	20	2 Sep 2022	Roosters
63	Zali Hopkins	38	5	0	0	20	21	10 Sep 2022	Broncos
64	Shontelle Stowers	2	0	0	0	0	22	18 Sep 2022	Knights
65	Taylor Mapusua	2	2	0	0	8	24	22 Jul 2023	Knights
66	Bobbi Law	15	4	0	0	16	24	22 Jul 2023	Knights
67	Shenai Lendill	29	2	0	0	8	24	22 Jul 2023	Knights
68	Tyla King	13	3	4	0	20	24	22 Jul 2023	Knights
69	Angelina Teakaraanga-Katoa	18	0	0	0	0	24	22 Jul 2023	Knights
70	Sara Sautia	8	1	0	0	4	24	22 Jul 2023	Knights
71	Roxy Murdoch-Masila	8	1	0	0	4	24	22 Jul 2023	Knights
72	Alexis Tauaneai	16	3	0	0	12	24	22 Jul 2023	Knights
73	Ella Koster	35	9	0	0	36	24	22 Jul 2023	Knights
74	Jamilee McGregor	20	0	3	0	6	24	22 Jul 2023	Knights
75	Margot Vella	15	9	0	0	36	25	29 Jul 2023	Eels
76	Cortez Te Pou	4	3	0	0	12	25	29 Jul 2023	Eels
77	Kaarla Cowan	5	0	0	0	0	25	29 Jul 2023	Eels
78	Sophie Clancy	8	1	0	0	4	26	3 Aug 2023	Roosters
79	Sarah Riordan	4	0	0	0	0	27	12 Aug 2023	Raiders
80	Cheynoah Amone	3	0	0	0	0	28	19 Aug 2023	Wests Tigers
81	Macie Carlile	3	0	0	0	0	28	19 Aug 2023	Wests Tigers
82	Madison Mulhall	25	2	0	0	8	30	2 Sep 2023	Cowboys
83	Ellie Williamson	1	1	0	0	4	32	16 Sep 2023	Broncos
84	Charlotte Basham	17	1	0	0	4	32	16 Sep 2023	Broncos
85	Ma’atuleio Fotu-Moala	6	3	0	0	12	33	28 Jul 2024	Titans
86	Kasey Reh	30	5	0	0	20	33	28 Jul 2024	Titans
87	Bronte Wilson	13	1	0	0	4	33	28 Jul 2024	Titans
88	Kimberley Hunt	4	5	0	0	20	34	4 Aug 2024	Cowboys
89	Alice Gregory	7	0	0	0	0	36	18 Aug 2024	Roosters
90	Maria Paseka	15	6	6	0	36	37	26 Aug 2024	Sharks
91	Jordyn Preston	2	0	0	0	0	37	26 Aug 2024	Sharks
92	Indie Bostock	7	3	0	0	12	42	5 Jul 2025	Raiders
93	Pia Tapsell	5	0	0	0	0	42	5 Jul 2025	Raiders
94	Nita Maynard-Perrin	12	0	0	0	0	42	5 Jul 2025	Raiders
95	Ahlivia Ingram	15	0	0	0	0	42	5 Jul 2025	Raiders
96	Trinity Tauaneai	19	1	0	0	4	42	5 Jul 2025	Raiders
97	Jayme Millard	16	7	10	0	48	45	27 Jul 2025	Broncos
98	Tyra Ekepati	13	3	0	0	12	46	3 Aug 2025	Eels
99	Tori Shipton	14	2	0	0	8	47	9 Aug 2025	Sharks
100	Tahlia O'Brien	13	3	0	0	12	47	9 Aug 2025	Sharks
101	Brooke Anderson	11	0	0	0	0	53	4 Jul 2026	Raiders
102	Shenae Ciesiolka	10	2	0	0	8	53	4 Jul 2026	Raiders
103	Ruby-Jean Kennard-Ellis	11	4	0	0	16	53	4 Jul 2026	Raiders
104	Montana Clifford	11	0	0	0	0	53	4 Jul 2026	Raiders
105	Amelia Huakau	9	0	0	0	0	54	12 Jul 2026	Eels
106	Lavinia Kitai	1	0	0	0	0	57	1 Aug 2026	Roosters
107	Seriah Palepale	1	0	0	0	0	61	30 Aug 2026	Warriors

== Representative honours ==
=== Women's State of Origin representatives ===
Past and current players who have played for Queensland and New South Wales in the State of Origin.

Player	State	Year(s)
Kezie Apps	New South Wales	2018–2022
Shaylee Bent	New South Wales	2020–2022
Sam Bremner	New South Wales	2018
Keeley Davis	New South Wales	2021–2022
Quincy Dodd	New South Wales	2022
Takilele Katoa	New South Wales	2019
Isabelle Kelly	New South Wales	2020
Jessica Sergis	New South Wales	2019–2020
Rachael Pearson	New South Wales	2022
Tiana Penitani-Gray	New South Wales	2019–2020
Hannah Southwell	New South Wales	2018
Holli Wheeler	New South Wales	2018–2021
Maddie Studdon	New South Wales	2019
Emma Verran	New South Wales	2022
Botille Vette-Welsh	New South Wales	2019
Shakiah Tungai	New South Wales	2019
Annette Brander	Queensland	2018
Brittany Breayley-Nati	Queensland	2019
Steph Hancock	Queensland	2020
Stephanie Mooka	Queensland	2019

=== National team representatives ===
Past and current players who have been selected to play for a national women's team and competed internationally.

Player	Years represented	Country
Kezie Apps	2018–2022	Australia
Annette Brander	2018	Australia
Shaylee Bent	2022	Australia
Keeley Davis	2018–2022	Australia
Tiana Penitani	2019	Australia
Jessica Sergis	2019	Australia
Hannah Southwell	2018	Australia
Shakiah Tungai	2019	Australia
Emma Verran^{(Note: Tonegato debuted in November 2013 for the Australian Women's Rugby Sevens. She has also represented Australia in the 2016 Summer Olympics and the 2020 Summer Olympics.)}	2022	Australia
Botille Vette-Welsh	2019	Australia
Holli Wheeler	2018–2022	Australia
Taliah Fuimaono	2022	Australia
Maria Paseka	2025	Fiji
Bronte Wilson	2024-2025	Italy
Madison Bartlett	2022	New Zealand
Maitua Feterika	2019	New Zealand
Teuila Fotu-Moala	2019	New Zealand
Honey Hireme	2018	New Zealand
Page McGregor	2022	New Zealand
Raecene McGregor	2018, 2023-2025	New Zealand
Tyla King	2023–2024	New Zealand
Alexis Tauaneai	2024	New Zealand
Angelina Teakaraanga-Katoa	2023–2024	New Zealand
Renee Targett	2022	Philippines
Taylor-Adeline Mapusua	2023	Samoa
Jessica Patea	2024	Samoa
Sarah Togatuki	2019	Samoa
Tegan Dymock	2022	Tonga
Maatuleio Fotu-Moala	2024	Tonga
Elsie Albert^{(Note: In September 2018, Albert played for Papua New Guinea in an NRLW trial game, and later made her official debut for them in October of the same year.)}	2020–2022	Papua New Guinea
Margot Vella	2023	Malta

=== Test captains ===
Name	Country	Year
Kezie Apps	Australia	2022

=== Prime Minister's XIII representatives ===
Past and current players who have been selected to play in the Prime Minister's XIII.

Player	Year(s)
Teagan Berry	2023–2024
Keele Browne	2024
Keeley Davis	2018
Rikeya Horne	2018
Melanie Howard	2018
Ella Koster	2024
Shenai Lendill	2025
Asipau Mafi	2018
Madison Mulhall	2025
Talesha Quinn	2018
Kasey Reh	2024–2025
Tori Shipton	2025
Hannah Southwell	2018
Shakiah Tungai	2018
Holli Wheeler	2018

=== All-Stars Representatives ===
Past and current players who have played for the Indigenous All-Stars or for the Māori All-Stars .

==== Indigenous All Stars ====
Player	Year(s)
Shaylee Bent	2022–2023
Jaime Chapman	2022
Quincy Dodd	2022–2023
Taliah Fuimaono	2022–2023, 2026
Ella Koster	2025–2026
Bobbi Law	2024–2025
Janelle Williams	2022

==== Māori All Stars (Māori people) ====
Player	Year(s)
Tyla King	2025
Raecene McGregor	2024–2025

Source: Dragons Women's Premiership Representative Honours Last updated: 11 October 2026

== Feeder team seasons ==
The St. George Illawarra Dragons run two women's pathways teams in the NSWRL Women's Premiership, the Tarsha Gale Cup, and the Lisa Fiaola Cup.

=== NSWRL Women's Premiership ===
==== St. George Dragons ====
Season	Regular season									Finals		Ref
Season	P	W	D	L	B	F	A	Pts	Pos	Top	Placing	Ref
2023	10	0	0	10	1	42	434	2	11th	4	—	
2024	11	4	0	7	0	134	222	8	8th	4	—	
2025	11	0	0	11	0	112	265	0	12th	4	—	
2026	11	2	1	8	0	164	326	5	10th	5	—	

==== Illawarra Steelers ====
Season	Regular season									Finals		Ref
Season	P	W	D	L	B	F	A	Pts	Pos	Top	Placing	Ref
2023	10	7	0	3	1	220	178	16	2nd	4	Semi-finalist	
2024	11	9	0	2	0	344	108	18	2nd	4	Premiers	
2025	11	8	0	3	0	230	160	16	4th	4	Semi-finalist	
2026	11	6	0	5	0	224	208	12	8th	5	—	

=== Tarsha Gale Cup ===
For Under 18 players from 2017 to 2020. Since 2021, the Cup is for Under 19 players.

==== St. George Dragons ====
Season	Regular season									Finals		Ref
Season	P	W	D	L	B	F	A	Pts	Pos	Top	Placing	Ref
2018	8	4	0	4	1	294	294	10	6th	8	Preliminary finalist	
2019	9	6	0	3	0	300	142	12	4th	8	Preliminary finalist	
2020	5	3	1	1	0	124	72	7	3rd	8	—	
2021	8	4	0	4	1	192	116	10	5th	6	Premiers	
2022	8	4	2	2	1	132	118	12	6th	6	Preliminary semi-finalist	
2023	8	1	1	6	1	70	276	5	12th	6	—	
2024	8	0	0	8	1	14	404	2	13th	6	—	
2025	8	1	1	6	1	92	163	5	10th	8	—	
2026	8	1	0	7	1	98	240	4	13th	8	—	

==== Illawarra Steelers ====
Season	Regular season									Finals		Ref
Season	P	W	D	L	B	F	A	Pts	Pos	Top	Placing	Ref
2018	9	8	0	1	0	480	250	10	2nd	8	Semi-finalist	
2019	9	8	0	1	0	364	122	16	1st	8	Premiers	
2020	5	5	0	0	0	156	26	10	1st	8	—	
2021	8	6	0	2	1	196	115	14	2nd	6	Semi-finalist	
2022	8	4	2	2	1	146	102	12	5th	6	Preliminary semi-finalist	
2023	8	4	1	3	1	162	82	11	4th	6	Semi-finalist	
2024	8	8	0	0	1	344	28	18	1st	6	Premiers	
2025	8	7	0	1	1	186	102	16	1st	8	Preliminary finalist	
2026	8	5	0	3	1	156	116	12	7th	8	Elimination finalist	

=== Lisa Fiaola Cup ===
For Under 17 players.

==== St. George Dragons ====
Season	Regular season									Finals		Ref
Season	P	W	D	L	B	F	A	Pts	Pos	Top	Placing	Ref
2024	8	0	0	8	1	16	424	2	13th	6	—	
2025	8	1	1	6	1	30	321	5	11th	8	—	
2026	8	1	0	7	1	74	294	4	13th	8	—	

==== Illawarra Steelers ====
Season	Regular season									Finals		Ref
Season	P	W	D	L	B	F	A	Pts	Pos	Top	Placing	Ref
2024	8	7	0	1	1	238	92	16	2nd	6	Semi-finalist	
2025	8	3	0	5	1	134	132	8	9th	8	—	
2026	8	1	0	7	1	56	260	4	12th	8	—	
