= Maddison Weatherall =

New Zealand rugby league footballer

Personal information
- Born: 10 September 2001 (age 24) Auckland, New Zealand
- Height: 175 cm (5 ft 9 in)
- Weight: 100 kg (15 st 10 lb)

Playing information
- Position: Prop, Lock
Club
Years	Team	Pld	T	G	FG	P
2019–	St George Illawarra	12	1	0	0	4
Representative
Years	Team	Pld	T	G	FG	P
2020	Māori All Stars	1	0	0	0	0
- Source: As of 29 November 2020

Maddison Weatherall (born 10 September 2001) is a New Zealand rugby league footballer who plays as a prop for the St George Illawarra in the NRL Women's Premiership and the Canterbury-Bankstown Bulldogs in the NSWRL Women's Premiership.

== Background ==
Born in Auckland, Weatherall was raised in Wollongong and played her junior rugby league for the Western Suburbs Red Devils.

== Playing career ==
In 2018, Weatherall played for the Illawarra Steelers in the Tarsha Gale Cup. Later that year, she joined the St George Illawarra Dragons NRL Women's Premiership squad as a development player.

=== 2019 ===
In 2019, Weatherall once again played for the Steelers' Tarsha Gale Cup team, captaining the side in their Grand Final win over the Newcastle Knights. On 18 June, she was promoted to the Dragons 22-woman squad.

On 21 June, she captained the New South Wales under-18 team in their 24–4 win over Queensland in the inaugural Under-18 State of Origin game.

In Round 1 of the 2019 NRL Women's season, Weatherall made her debut for the Dragons in a 4–14 loss to the Brisbane Broncos. On 6 October, she came off the bench in the Dragons' 6–30 Grand Final loss to the Broncos.

=== 2020 ===
In 2020, Weatherall joined the Canterbury-Bankstown Bulldogs NRL Women's Premiership team. On 22 February, she came off the bench for the Māori All Stars in their 4–10 loss to the Indigenous All Stars.

Weatherall played just one NRLW game for the Dragons in 2020, starting at lock in their Round 3 loss to the New Zealand Warriors.
