= Ella Koster =

Australian rugby league footballer

Personal information
- Born: 16 July 2005 (age 21) Wollongong, New South Wales, Australia
- Height: 171 cm (5 ft 7 in)
- Weight: 73 kg (11 st 7 lb)

Playing information
- Position: Second-row, Lock
Club
Years	Team	Pld	T	G	FG	P
2023–	St. George Illawarra Dragons	35	9	0	0	36
Representative
Years	Team	Pld	T	G	FG	P
2024	Prime Minister's XIII	1	0	0	0	0
2025	Indigenous All Stars	1	1	0	0	4
- Source: As of 31 October 2026

Ella Koster is a rugby league footballer who plays Second-row for the St George Illawarra Dragons in the NRL Women's Premiership.

== Background ==
Born in Shellharbour, New South Wales, Australia. Koster is of Indigenous Australian descent. Koster played her junior rugby for Albion Park-Oak Flats Eagles.

== Playing career ==
=== 2023 ===
In round 1, Koster made her debut coming off the bench for the St. George Illawarra Dragons against the Newcastle Knights at McDonald Jones Stadium. Koster played 8 games for the Dragons scoring 2 tries as well as getting the NRLW Emerging Talent award. On 4 October, Koster resigned with the Dragons until 2025.

=== 2024 ===
On 11 January, Koster was selected for the under 19 New South Wales Blues.

In round 4, Koster made her season debut after a shoulder injury. Koster finished the season playing 6 games and scoring 3 tries. Koster was selected to play for the Australian Prime Minister's XIII.

=== 2025 ===
On 15 February, Koster scored a try on debut for Indigenous All Stars in their 20-18 win against the Maori All Stars.

On 4th April 2025 Koster re-signed with the Dragons until the end of the 2027 season.
