= Nathan Cross (rugby league) =

Australian rugby league coach and former footballer

Personal information
- Born: 1979 (age 46–47)

Coaching information
Club
Years	Team	Gms	W	D	L	W%
2025–	St George Illawarra W	11	3	0	8	27
Representative
Years	Team	Gms	W	D	L	W%
2026–	Queensland	3	0	0	3	0
- Source: RLP As of 15 November 2026

Nathan Cross (born 1979) is an Australian professional rugby league coach and former player. He is currently the head coach of the St George Illawarra Dragons NRLW team and the Queensland women's team.

== Playing career ==
Cross was born in Casino, New South Wales and raised in Byron Bay. He played his junior rugby league for the Byron Bay Red Devils and attended Trinity Catholic College, Lismore.

Cross spent time in the Parramatta Eels lower grade system, scoring a try in their 1999 NSWRL First Division Grand Final win over the Balmain Tigers, and later played for the Tweed Heads Seagulls in the Queensland Cup.

== Coaching career ==
In 2008, Cross coached Byron Bay to the Northern Rivers Regional Rugby League premiership, their first title.

On 24 October 2024, Cross was appointed as head coach of the St George Illawarra NRLW side. Prior to his appointment, he served as an assistant coach for the Tweed Seagulls in the Queensland Cup, head coach of the Queensland Rugby League's Pathways and Performance program and as a pathways coach for the Gold Coast Titans.

On 31 October 2025, after serving as assistant coach for three years, Cross was named head coach of the Queensland women's team.
