= Tyler Reid (rugby league) =

New Zealand rugby league footballer

Personal information
- Born: 7 May 1994 (age 30); Oamaru, New Zealand

Playing information
- Position: Prop
Club
Years	Team	Pld	T	G	FG	P
2019	New Zealand Warriors	1	0	0	0	0
- Source: RLP As of 14 November 2020

Tyler Reid (born 7 May 1994) is a New Zealand rugby league footballer who played for the New Zealand Warriors in the NRL Women's Premiership. She primarily plays as a prop.

== Background ==
Reid was born in Oamaru, New Zealand.

== Playing career ==
Before switching to rugby league, Reid played rugby union for Hamilton Old Boys and Waikato. In 2018, she founded the Taupiri rugby union club.

In 2019, Reid began playing rugby league for the Papakura Sisters in Auckland. That year, she represented Counties Maukau at the NZRL Women's National Tournament.

In August 2019, Reid joined the New Zealand Warriors NRL Women's Premiership team as a replacement for the injured Va'anessa Molia-Fraser.

In Round 2 of the 2019 NRL Women's season, she made her debut for the Warriors in a 6–26 loss to the St George Illawarra Dragons.
