= Madison Mulhall =

Australian rugby league footballer

Personal information
- Full name: Madison Mulhall
- Born: 23 May 2004 (age 22) Camden, New South Wales, Australia

Playing information
- Position: Prop
Club
Years	Team	Pld	T	G	FG	P
2023–	St George Illawarra Dragons	25	2	0	0	8
Representative
Years	Team	Pld	T	G	FG	P
2025	Prime Minister's XIII	1	0	0	0	0
- Source: Dragons.com.au As of 31 October 2026

Madison Mulhall (born 23 May 2004) is an Australian professional rugby league footballer who currently plays for the St George Illawarra Dragons in the NRL Women's Premiership. Primarily a prop, she won the St George Illawarra Dragons player of the year award in season 2025.

== Club career ==
Mulhall played for the St. George Dragons in the 2022 Tarsha Gale Cup, appearing in all seven matches from the opening round to her team's elimination in the first week of the finals. Ahead of the 2022 NRLW season, she was named as a Dragons academy player.

Mulhall began 2023 by again playing in the Tarsha Gale Cup, captaining the St. George Dragons in eight appearances from early February to early April. The first of three appearances in the open-age NSWRL Women's Premiership was made when her Under 19 team had a bye.

On 2 September 2023, Mulhall made her NRLW debut for the Dragons in Round 7, scoring a try in the large, 48-16, win over the North Queensland Cowboys in Townsville. Mulhall played in the remaining two Dragons' matches of the 2023 season and her contract extension was announced in December 2023.

After playing a reserve grade (NSWRL Women's Premiership) match during the first weekend of August 2024, Mulhall returned to the Dragons' NRLW team in Round 3 and played all their subsequent matches of the 2024 season, for a total of seven appearances. Mulhall scored her only try of the 2024 season in the 16-14 loss to the Wests Tigers at Leichhardt Oval in Round 8.

Mulhall played in all eleven of the Dragons' matches in the 2025 NRLW season, starting in the front row and received the club's player of the year award.

On the 19th August 2025, Mulhall re-signed with the Red V until the end of the 2027.

== Representative career ==
In October 2025, Mulhall was selected in and played her first open-age representative match, for the Australian Prime Minister's XIII.
