= Aaliyah Fasavalu-Fa'amausili =

Australian rugby league footballer

Personal information
- Born: 21 December 2000 (age 24) Westmead, New South Wales, Australia
- Height: 160 cm (5 ft 3 in)
- Weight: 70 kg (11 st 0 lb)

Playing information

Rugby league
- Position: Prop, Hooker
Club
Years	Team	Pld	T	G	FG	P
2019–20	St George Illawarra	6	1	0	0	4
Representative
Years	Team	Pld	T	G	FG	P
2018	Prime Minister's XIII	1	0	0	0	0

Rugby union
- Position: Flanker
Club
Years	Team	Pld	T	G	FG	P
2020	NSW Waratahs	3	0	0	0	0
- Source: As of 5 November 2023

Aaliyah Fasavalu-Fa'amausili (born 21 December 2000) is an Australian rugby league and rugby union footballer who last played for the St. George Illawarra in the NRL Women's Premiership and the South Sydney Rabbitohs in the NSWRL Women's Premiership.

== Background ==
Born in Westmead, New South Wales, Fasavalu-Fa'amausili began playing rugby league for the Auburn Warriors when she was 11.

== Playing career ==
In 2017, Fasavalu-Fa'amausili played for the Canterbury-Bankstown Bulldogs in the Tarsha Gale Cup. In 2018, she moved to the St George Illawarra Dragons Tarsha Gale Cup team and was named as a development player for the Dragons' NRL Women's Premiership team. On 6 October 2018, she played for the Prime Minister's XIII in their 40–4 win over Papua New Guinea.

=== 2019 ===
In May, Fasavalu-Fa'amausili represented NSW City at the Women's National Championships. On 18 June, she re-signed with the Dragons, joining their full NRLW squad.

In Round 2 of the 2019 NRL Women's season, she made her debut for the Dragons in their 26–6 win over the New Zealand Warriors. On 6 October, she started on the bench in the Dragons' 6–30 Grand Final loss to the Brisbane Broncos.

=== 2020 ===
In 2020, she played for the Canterbury-Bankstown Bulldogs in the NSWRL Women's Premiership. In Round 3 of the 2020 NRL Women's season, she scored her first NRLW try in the Dragons' 10–22 loss to the New Zealand Warriors.
