= Stephanie Mooka =

Australian rugby league footballer (born 1991)

Personal information
- Born: 5 March 1991 (age 35) Thursday Island, Queensland, Australia
- Height: 180 cm (5 ft 11 in)
- Weight: 85 kg (13 st 5 lb)

Playing information
- Position: Centre, Wing
Club
Years	Team	Pld	T	G	FG	P
2019	St George Illawarra	1	0	0	0	0
Representative
Years	Team	Pld	T	G	FG	P
2019	Queensland	1	0	0	0	0
2020	Indigenous All Stars	1	1	0	0	4
- Source: RLP As of 7 November 2020

Stephanie Mooka (born 5 March 1991) is an Australian rugby league footballer who plays for the North Queensland Gold Stars in the QRL Women's Premiership.

Primarily a centre, she is Queensland and Indigenous All Stars representative and previously played for the St George Illawarra Dragons in the NRL Women's Premiership.

== Background ==
Born on Thursday Island, Mooka began playing rugby league for the Edmonton Lightning. After her local women's competition folded in 2011, Mooka took up rugby union and Australian rules football. She played 67 games in the AFL Cairns Women's competition for South Cairns cutters including 31 goals and was named best on ground 43 times.

== Playing career ==
In May 2019, Mooka represented Queensland Country at the Women's National Championships. On 21 June 2019, she made her debut for Queensland, starting at centre in a 4–14 loss to New South Wales.

On 2 July 2019, Mooka signed with the St George Illawarra Dragons NRL Women's Premiership team. In Round 1 of the 2019 NRL Women's season, Mooka made her debut for the Dragons in a 4–14 loss to the Brisbane Broncos.

On 22 February 2020, Mooka started at centre and scored a try for the Indigenous All Stars in their 10–4 win over the Māori All Stars. On 27 February 2020, Mooka was named in the inaugural North Queensland Gold Stars squad for the QRL Women's Premiership.
