= Emma Verran =

Australian dual-code rugby player

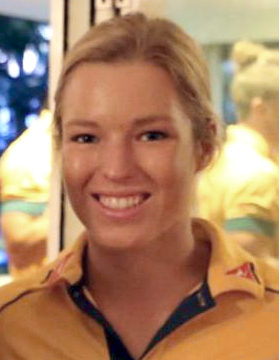
- Verran in Fiji in 2016
- Born: Emma Kate Tonegato OAM; 20 March 1995 (age 31) Wollongong, New South Wales, Australia
- Height: 1.65 m (5 ft 5 in)
- Weight: 68 kg (150 lb)

Rugby union career
- Position: Back
Amateur team(s)
Years	Team	Apps	(Points)
- The Tribe
National sevens team
Years	Team		Comps
2013–21	Australia 7s		
- Rugby league career

Playing information
- Position: Five-eighth, Fullback
Club
Years	Team	Pld	T	G	FG	P
2021–22	St George Illawarra Dragons	13	5	0	0	20
2023–26	Cronulla Sharks	30	12	0	0	48
2027–	St George Illawarra Dragons	0	0	0	0	0
	Total	43	17	0	0	68
Representative
Years	Team	Pld	T	G	FG	P
2022–25	New South Wales	9	2	0	0	8
2022–23	Australia	6	5	0	0	20
- Source: As of 18 November 2026
Medal record
Women's rugby sevens
Representing Australia
Olympic Games
Gold medal – first place	2016 Rio de Janeiro	Team competition
Commonwealth Games
Silver medal – second place	2018 Gold Coast	Team competition

Emma Kate Verran (née Tonegato) OAM (born 20 March 1995) is a professional Australian rugby league player. She has represented Australia in rugby sevens and rugby league. Born in Wollongong, New South Wales and playing for The Tribe at rugby union club level, she debuted for Australia in November 2013. As of December 2015, she had 12 caps. She won a gold medal at the 2016 Summer Olympics in Rio.

== Life ==
Emma's father is Italian Stefano Tonegato who emigrated to Australia from Valdagno, specifically from a frazione named "San Quirico Valdagno". Emma started to play rugby when she was ten years old in a female junior team.

== Career ==
Tonegato made her debut for the Australian Women's side in the opening leg of the 2013–14 IRB Sevens World Series in Dubai in November 2013. She has been a regular on the team since. She switched to rugby league and competed at the 2013 Women's Rugby League World Cup. She has the ability to play on the wing or in the centres.

Tonegato was named in the tournament Dream Team for the Amsterdam leg of the Rugby Sevens World Series in May 2015. Representative Honours include New South Wales, NSW Schoolgirls (2013) and the Youth Olympic Festival (2013).

Tonegato was a member of Australia's team at the 2016 Summer Olympics, defeating New Zealand in the final to win the inaugural sport Olympic gold medal.

At the 2017 Australia Day Honours she received the Medal of the Order of Australia for service to sport as a gold medalist at the Rio 2016 Summer Olympics.

Tonegato was named in the Australia squad for the Rugby sevens at the 2020 Summer Olympics. The team came second in the pool round but then lost to Fiji 14-12 in the quarterfinals. Full details.

In 2021, Tonegato signed with the St George Illawarra Dragons and played 7 games including the NRLW 2021 Grand Final, where they lost 16-4. She also won the Dally M Medal for best and fairest. In 2022, she re-signed with the Dragons, where she played 6 games, including in the Semi Final against the Knights.

In 2023, she played her debut season at the Cronulla Sharks in their inaugural season, playing 9 games, and scoring 3 tries. Later that year she played in the first Womens State of Origin 2 game series, playing both games, and scoring 1 try.

In 2024, Emma played in Game 1 of the Women's State of Origin series, scoring a try.
