= Shakiah Tungai =

Australia international rugby league footballer

Personal information
- Born: 29 November 1996 (age 28) Wollongong, New South Wales, Australia
- Height: 165 cm (5 ft 5 in)
- Weight: 69 kg (10 st 12 lb)

Playing information
- Position: Wing, Five-eighth, Fullback
Club
Years	Team	Pld	T	G	FG	P
2018–20	St. George Illawarra	8	3	3	0	18
2022	Brisbane Broncos	2	0	0	0	0
2023–	Canberra Raiders	9	4	1	0	18
	Total	19	7	4	0	36
Representative
Years	Team	Pld	T	G	FG	P
2018	Prime Minister's XIII	1	3	3	0	18
2019–20	Indigenous All Stars	2	1	0	0	4
2019	New South Wales	1	1	0	0	4
2019	Australia 9s	4	2	1	0	10
2019	Australia	1	1	4	0	12
- Source: As of 1 November 2023

Shakiah Tungai (born 29 November 1996) is an Australian rugby league footballer who plays a wing and five-eighth for the St. George Illawarra Dragons Women in the NRL Women's Premiership. She is an Australian and New South Wales representative. Shakiah attended Barrack Heights Public School and Warilla High School.

== Background ==
Born in Wollongong, Tungai is of Indigenous Australian descent.

Growing up, she played soccer in first grade since the age of 14, winning numerous ‘golden boot’ awards as the leagues leading goal scorer. Shakiah's team were very successful, winning many State Cup Championships during her soccer career, before switching to rugby league in 2017. In 2016, she won the Kyah Simon Player of the Tournament Medal at the National Indigenous Soccer Championships.

== Playing career ==
=== 2018 ===
In June, while playing for the Avondale Greyhounds in the Illawarra Rugby League, Tungai represented NSW Country at the Women's National Championships. On 26 July, she signed with the St. George Illawarra Dragons NRL Women's Premiership team.

In Round 1 of the 2018 NRL Women's season, she made her debut for the Dragons in a 4–30 loss to the Brisbane Broncos. She scored one try and kicked three goals during the season, finishing as the Dragons' top point scorer.

On 6 October, Tungai scored three tries and kicked three goals for the Prime Minister's XIII in a 40–4 win over Papua New Guinea.

=== 2019 ===
On 15 February, Tungai represented the Indigenous All Stars, scoring a try in their 4–8 loss to the Māori All Stars.

In May, she represented NSW Country at the Women's National Championships. On 21 June, Tungai made her State of Origin debut for New South Wales, scoring a try in their 14–4 win over Queensland.

On 6 October, Tungai started on the wing in the Dragons' 6–30 NRLW Grand Final loss to the Broncos. In October, she represented Australia at the 2019 Rugby League World Cup 9s.

On 25 October, Tungai made her Test debut for Australia, scoring a try and kicking three goals in a 8–28 win over New Zealand.

=== 2020 ===
On 22 February, Tungai started at fullback for the Indigenous All Stars in their 10–4 win over the Māori All Stars, injuring her shoulder in the match.

In Round 1 of the 2020 NRL Women's season, Tungai started at five-eighth for the Dragons in a 4–18 loss to the Sydney Roosters. She injured her shoulder during the game, ruling her out for the remainder of the season.
