= Shaylee Bent =

Australia international rugby league player (born 2000)

Personal information
- Born: 13 September 2000 (age 26) Penrith, New South Wales, Australia
- Height: 174 cm (5 ft 9 in)
- Weight: 78 kg (12 st 4 lb)

Playing information
- Position: Second-row, Centre
Club
Years	Team	Pld	T	G	FG	P
2019–22	St George Illawarra	19	2	0	0	8
2023–25	Gold Coast Titans	32	3	0	0	12
2026–	Wests Tigers	12	3	0	0	12
	Total	63	8	0	0	32
Representative
Years	Team	Pld	T	G	FG	P
2019–24	Indigenous All Stars	6	1	0	0	4
2019	Australia 9s	2	0	0	0	0
2020–23	New South Wales	4	0	0	0	0
2022–26	Australia	8	4	0	0	16
2024–25	Prime Minister's XIII	2	0	0	0	0
- Source: As of 16 November 2026

Shaylee Bent (born 13 September 2000) is an Australian rugby league footballer who plays as a second-rower for the Wests Tigers in the NRL Women's Premiership and the Wynnum Manly Seagulls in the QRL Women's Premiership.

She is a New South Wales, Indigenous All Stars and Australian representative.

== Background ==
Born in Penrith, New South Wales, Bent is of Indigenous Australian and Greek descent. At age 15, Bent began playing rugby league for the Glenmore Park Brumbies.

== Playing career ==
=== 2017 ===
In 2017, she played for the Parramatta Eels in the Tarsha Gale Cup.

=== 2018 ===
In 2018, she moved to the Wests Tigers Tarsha Gale Cup side.

After the Tarsha Gale Cup season, Bent joined Mounties in the NSWRL Women's Premiership. Where she started as centre in the Grand Final victory over South Sydney 12–10.

=== 2019 ===
In 2019, Bent re-joined Mounties RLFC in the NSWRL Women's Premiership, starting at centre in their Grand Final loss to CRL Newcastle. In May 2019, she represented NSW City at the NRL Women's National Championships. In July, she was 18th player for the New South Wales side.

In Round 1 of the 2019 NRL Women's season, Bent made her debut for the St George Illawarra Dragons in a 4–14 loss to the Brisbane Broncos. On 6 October, she started at second-row in the Dragons' 30–6 Grand Final loss to the Broncos. Later that month, she represented Australia at the 2019 Rugby League World Cup 9s.

=== 2020 ===
On 22 February, she started at second-row for the Indigenous All Stars in their 10–4 win over the Maori All Stars. In 2020, she played for the South Sydney Rabbitohs in the NSWRL Women's Premiership.

On 17 October, she was named the Dragons' NRLW Player of the Year. On 13 November, she made her State of Origin debut for New South Wales, starting at second-row in their 18–24 loss to Queensland.

=== 2021 ===
In 2021, Bent joined the Tweed Heads Seagulls in the QRL Women's Premiership.

On 20 February, she represented the Indigenous All Stars in their 24–0 loss to the Māori All Stars.

=== 2022 ===
On 12 February, Bent represented the Indigenous All Stars in their 18-8 win to the Māori All Stars.

In round 3 of the 2021 NRL Women's season, Bent scored her first try against the Brisbane Broncos. Bent played in the 2021 NRL Women's Premiership Grand Final losing 16-4 against the Sydney Roosters.

On 24 June, Bent played in 2022 Women's State of Origin for the New South Wales, in their 20-14 win.

Bent played six matches for the St. George Illawarra Dragons in the 2022 NRL Women's season

Bent was selected for The Jillaroos in the 2021 Women's Rugby League World Cup. Bent scored a try in the semi-final against Papua New Guinea. Bent came off the bench in the 2021 Women's Rugby League World Cup final, winning 54-4 against New Zealand.

=== 2023 ===
On 11 February, Bent represented the Indigenous All Stars in their 16-12 loss to the Māori All Stars.

Bent came off the bench both games for the New South Wales Blues.

Bent signed with the Gold Coast Titans to begin the 2023 NRL Women's season. In round 3, Bent scored her first try as a Titan against the Cronulla Sharks. In round 9, Bent scored a try against the Canberra Raiders. Bent played in 2023 Grand Final unfortunately losing 24-12 to the Newcastle Knights.

=== 2024 ===
On 16 February, Bent scored the opening try for the Indigenous All-Stars, defeating the Māori All-Stars 26-4.

Bent played 9 games for the Gold Coast Titans in 2024. On 9 October, Bent signed an extension with the Titans until 2027.

Bent was selected to play for the Australian Prime Minister's XIII.

=== 2026 ===
On 18 March 2026 it was reported that she had signed for Wests Tigers in the NRLW on a 2-year deal.

== Achievements and accolades ==
=== Individual ===
- St George Illawarra Dragons Player of the Year: 2020

=== Representative ===
- Rugby League World Cup Champion: 2026
