= Takilele Katoa =

New Zealand rugby league & union player

Personal information
- Born: 13 March 1991 (age 34); Auckland, New Zealand
- Height: 167 cm (5 ft 6 in)
- Weight: 82 kg (12 st 13 lb)

Playing information
- Position: Prop
Club
Years	Team	Pld	T	G	FG	P
2019	St George Illawarra	4	0	0	0	0
Representative
Years	Team	Pld	T	G	FG	P
2019	New South Wales	1	0	0	0	0
- Source: RLP As of 20 October 2020

Takilele Katoa (born 13 March 1991) is a New Zealand rugby league footballer who played for the St. George Illawarra Dragons Women in the NRL Women's Premiership.

Primarily a prop, she has represented New South Wales.

== Playing career ==
Born in Auckland, Katoa played her junior rugby league for the Griffith Waratah Tigers and Yenda All Stars.

In June 2019, she represented NSW Country at the Women's National Championships on the Gold Coast. On 14 June 2019, Katoa signed with the St George Illawarra Dragons NRL Women's Premiership team.

On 21 June 2019, she made her debut for New South Wales, coming off the bench in their 14–4 win over Queensland at North Sydney Oval.

In Round 1 of the 2019 NRL Women's season, Katoa made her debut for the Dragons in their 4–14 loss to the Brisbane Broncos. On 6 October 2019, she came off the bench in the Dragons' 6–30 Grand Final loss to the Broncos.

On 9 October 2019, Katoa was named the Country Rugby League women's Representative Player of the Year.

In 2020, she missed the 2020 NRL Women's season due to pregnancy.
