= Holli Wheeler =

Australia international rugby league footballer (b.1990)

Personal information
- Born: 28 January 1990 (age 36) Taree, New South Wales, Australia
- Height: 176 cm (5 ft 9 in)
- Weight: 77 kg (12 st 2 lb)

Playing information
- Position: Second-row, Lock, Prop
Club
Years	Team	Pld	T	G	FG	P
2018–22	St George Illawarra Dragons	20	0	2	0	4
2023–24	Cronulla Sharks	17	2	0	0	8
2025	Canterbury-Bankstown Bulldogs	9	0	0	0	0
2026	Wests Tigers	11	0	0	0	0
	Total	57	2	2	0	12
Representative
Years	Team	Pld	T	G	FG	P
2018–21	New South Wales	3	0	0	0	0
2018	Prime Minister's XIII	1	0	0	0	0
2018–22	Australia	5	0	4	0	8
- Source: As of 2 November 2023

Holli Wheeler (born 28 January 1990) is an Australian rugby league footballer who plays as a lock or prop for the Wests Tigers in the NRL Women's Premiership.

She is a former Australian and New South Wales representative.

== Background ==
Born in Taree, New South Wales, Wheeler began playing rugby league for the Old Bar Pirates.

== Playing career ==
=== 2018 ===
In June, Wheeler represented NSW Country at the Women's National Championships. On 22 June, Wheeler made her State of Origin debut for New South Wales in their 16–10 win over Queensland.

On 27 June, Wheeler joined the St. George Illawarra Dragons NRL Women's Premiership team. In Round 1 of the 2018 NRL Women's season, she made her debut for the Dragons in a 4–30 loss to the Brisbane Broncos. On 3 October, she was named the inaugural Dragons' Women's Player of the Year.

On 6 October, she represented the Prime Minister's XIII in a 40–4 win over Papua New Guinea. A week later, she made her Test debut for Australia in their 26–24 win over New Zealand.

=== 2019 ===
In May, Wheeler represented NSW Country at the Women's National Championships. On 21 June, she came off the bench in New South Wales' 14–4 win over Queensland.

On 6 October, she started at lock in the Dragons' 6–30 Grand Final loss to the Broncos. On 25 October, she came off the bench in Australia's 28–8 win over New Zealand at WIN Stadium.

=== 2020 ===
In February, Wheeler tore her anterior cruciate ligament (ACL) at the NRL Nines, ruling her out for the season.
