= Teagan Berry =

Australian rugby league footballer

Personal information
- Born: 20 May 2002 (age 24) Port Macquarie, New South Wales, Australia
- Height: 176 cm (5 ft 9 in)
- Weight: 70 kg (11 st 0 lb)

Playing information
- Position: Fullback, Wing
Club
Years	Team	Pld	T	G	FG	P
2020–26	St George Illawarra	41	38	1	0	154
2027–	Cronulla Sharks	0	0	0	0	0
	Total	41	38	1	0	154
Representative
Years	Team	Pld	T	G	FG	P
2023–24	Prime Minister’s XIII	2	2	0	0	8
2026	New South Wales	3	0	0	0	0
- Source: As of 31 October 2026

Teagan Berry (born 20 May 2002) is an Australian rugby league footballer who plays as a fullback for the Cronulla Sharks in the NRL Women's Premiership.

== Background ==
Raised in Oak Flats, New South Wales, Berry attended Oak Flats Primary and High school. Berry has a twin sister Olivia and an older brother Jackson. Berry began playing rugby league in 2018 for the Shellharbour Stingrays.

== Playing career ==
In 2019, Berry joined the Illawarra Steelers Tarsha Gale Cup side, scoring two tries in their 24–12 Grand Final win over the Newcastle Knights. On 21 June 2019, she started on the wing for New South Wales under-18, scoring two tries in a 24–4 win over Queensland.

=== 2020 ===
In 2020, Berry began the season playing for the Steelers in the Tarsha Gale Cup. On 24 September, Berry joined the St. George Illawarra Dragons NRL Women's Premiership team.

In Round 3 of the 2020 NRL Women's season, she made her debut for the Dragons, scoring a try and kicking a goal in a 10–22 loss to the New Zealand Warriors.

=== 2021 ===
Berry was a part of the Dragons side that made the delayed 2021 NRLW Grand Final, in the 16–4 defeat to the Sydney Roosters.

=== 2023 ===
Berry was selected in the extended NSW squad for Game 1 of Women's State of Origin.

Teagan Berry was named as the new fullback for the Dragons in 2023, following the departure of 2021 Dally M Winner and Olympic Gold Medallist Emma Tonegato.

Currently, Berry is the outright leading tryscorer of all time in NRLW history with 21 tries in just 23 games.

In Round 6 of the 2023 season, Berry became the third NRLW player to score four tries in a match.

Berry was named at fullback for the Australian Prime Minister's XIII team to play Papua New Guinea in the annual fixture in Port Moresby in September.

Berry won the 2023 RLPA Players Champion Award as voted by her peers and was selected in the end of season Jillaroos squad but did not play.

=== 2025 ===
Teagan Berry re-signed with the Dragons until the end of the 2026 season

=== 2026 ===
She made her New South Wales début in Game 1 of the 2026 State of Origin on 30 April 2026 in the 11-6 win.
