= International rugby league in 2026 =

- Australia celebrating their 13th world title at the 2026 Men's Rugby League World Cup

A list of men's, women's, and wheelchair senior international rugby league matches played throughout 2026.

A † denotes a match that did not contribute to the IRL World Rankings - i.e. not a senior international match (SIM) as designated by the International Rugby League (IRL). (Note: IRL defines a SIM as "any match in which a player represents a national federation, where such match has been sanctioned and recognised by IRL and the relevant national federations as a match played between senior national teams, which are national teams of a member national federation playing in a match for world rankings points.")

The season includes the 2026 Rugby League World Cup held in Australia, Papua New Guinea, and New Zealand during October and November 2026.

== Season overview ==
=== Men ===
Men's international friendlies
Date	Home team	Away team	Winners
27 February	United States	Scotland	United States
6 June†	Vanuatu	Singapore	Vanuatu
2 July	Norway	Canada	Canada
5 July	Scotland	Canada	Scotland
11 July	Netherlands	Canada	Canada
12 September	Netherlands	Germany	Germany
10 October	Canada	Jamaica	Canada
17 October	Wales	United States	Wales
21 November	Philippines	Japan	Philippines

Men's international tournaments
Start date	Tournament	Winners
17 October	European Championship D	Italy
3 October	European Championship C	Greece
18 October	European Championship B	Netherlands
17 October	Celtic Cup	Wales
15 October	World Cup	Australia

=== Women ===
Women's international friendlies
Date	Home team	Away team	Winners
27 February	United States	Scotland	Scotland
19 July	Wales	Canada	Canada
25 July	Scotland	Canada	Canada
25 July	France	England	England
1 August	France	Nigeria	France
26 September	Malta	Lebanon	Lebanon
10 October	Cook Islands	Tonga	Tonga
17 October	Greece	Jamaica	Jamaica
17 October	Netherlands	Scotland	Scotland
25 October	Malta	Philippines	Malta

Women's international tournaments
Start date	Tournament	Winners
16 October	World Cup	Australia

=== Wheelchair ===
Wheelchair international tours
Start date	Touring side	Region	Results [Matches]
11 July	Ireland	France	0–2 [2]

Wheelchair international tournaments
Start date	Tournament	Winners
23 May	Celtic Cup	Ireland
30 October	World Cup	England

== January ==
=== Barrow Raiders v Scotland men ===
10 January 2026
15:00 GMT (UTC±00:00)

Barrow Raiders	74–6†	Scotland
Tries: Robson, Toal (2), Broadbent (2), Ritson (2), Johnston, Bulman, Cresswell (3), Archer; Goals: B. Walker 3/4, Broadbent 1/1, Archer 7/8	1st: 44–0; 2nd: 30–6; Report	Tries: Grierson; Goals: Duncan (1/1)

Craven Park, Barrow-in-Furness
Attendance: 1,004
Referee: Carl Hughes (England)

Team details
Barrow Raiders		Position	Scotland
Name	Number	Position	Number	Name
Luke Cresswell	1	FB	1	Max Anderson-Moore
Luke Broadbent	2	WG	2	Cam Cullen
Curtis Teare	3	CE	3	Shaun Callan
Shane Toal	4	CE	4	Jacob Grierson
Tee Ritson	5	WG	5	Andrew Brown
Brad Walker	6	SO	6	George Shannon
Ryan Johnston	7	SH	7	Lewis Clarke
Tom Walker	8	PR	8	Connor Terrill
Josh Wood	9	HK	9	Jordan Duncan
Joe Bullock	10	PF	10	Kieran Moran
Ellis Robson	11	SR	11	Seth Clapham
Matty Costello	12	SR	12	Gregor Cowan
Ryan King	13	LF	13	Ollie Maher
Greg Richards	14	IN	14	Tom Murray
Charlie Emslie	15	IN	15	Joey Clarkson
Alex Bishop	16	IN	16	Ben Sykes
Andrew Bulman	17	IN	17	Lucas-Anderson-Moore
Trent Ruddy	18	Interchange	18	Kris Illingworth
Seth Woodend	19	RES	19	Shane Toal
Dan Knott	20	IN
Fin Dutton-Rosconie	21	IN
Stevie Watson	22	IN
Ellis Archer	23	IN
Paul Creary		Coach		Adam Houston

This match was a testimonial match for Barrow player, Shane Toal. He and fellow Barrow and Scotland international Max Anderson-Moore played a half for each team.

== February ==
=== USA v Scotland double header ===
Women's

27 February 2026
18:00 PT (UTC-08:00)

United States	14–26	Scotland
Tries: Tone, Granby, Asumang; Goals: Fish (1/3)	1st: 0–10; 2nd: 14–16; Report	Tries: Grey, Smart, Stewart, Simpson (2); Goals: Stewart (3/5)

Coronado High School, Henderson

Team details
United States		Position	Scotland
Name	Number	Position	Number	Name
Brittany Royes	1	FB	1	Rebecca Smart
Sydney Pua	2	WG	2	Raphaella Aquilina
Mia Blocher	3	CE	3	Steph Gray
Brandice Neal	4	CE	4	Enya Lackie
Josephine Asumang	5	WG	5	Olivia Barnard
Teree Okabe	6	SO	6	Emma Whelsford
Tiana Granby	7	SH	7	Isabel Glover
Afi Tone	8	PR	8	Robyn Price
Nicole Fisch	9	HK	9	Cerys Gregory
Kadie Sandford	10	PF	10	Georgia Briggs
Jeanna Beard	11	SR	11	Sammi Simpson
ShaMarica Scott	12	SR	12	Ciorstadia Ainsworth
Sarah Anderson	13	LF	13	Nicole Stewart
Paris Hart	14	IN	14	Morgan Pearson
Isabel Henderson	15	IN	15	Grace Field
Salataima Mamea	16	IN	16	Betti Ginnelly
Maiah Alofaituli	17	IN	17	Rebecca White
Taylor White	18	RES
Troy Clarkson		Coach		Gareth Nicholson

Men's

27 February 2026
20:15 PT (UTC-08:00)

United States	28–20	Scotland
Tries: Hlanguyo, Vidot, Delaney, Piggins, Bryce; Goals: Tupuola (0/1), Granby (4/4)	1st: 10–12; 2nd: 18–8; Report	Tries: Clarke, Anderson-Moore, Carter, Brown; Goals: Punton (2/4)

Coronado High School, Henderson
Attendance: 748
Referee: Cody Kuxmann

Team details
United States		Position	Scotland
Name	Number	Position	Number	Name
Ryan Burroughs	1	FB	1	Pete Burns
Shingirai Hlanguyo	2	WG	2	Brett Carter
Jason Martin	3	CE	3	Andrew Brown
David Washington	4	CE	4	Jacob Grierson
Esteban Tupuola	5	WG	5	Max Anderson-Moore
Celcius Tarawhiti	6	SO	6	Lewis Clarke
Peter Lupton	7	SH	7	Luke Punton
Tevita Bryce	8	PR	8	Connor Terrill
Jace Delaney	9	HK	9	Ross Whitmore
Matt Finnesy	10	PF	10	Ben Morris
Daniel Vidot	11	SR	11	George Shannon
Wes Piggins	12	SR	12	Dan Turland
Joe Eichner	13	LF	13	Kieran Moran
Fatai Makavaha	14	IN	14	Jordan Duncan
Kyle Granby	15	IN	15	Joe Kirkup
Tyler Sisley	16	IN	16	Niall Hall
Anson Jiang	17	IN	17	Tom Murray
		RES	18	Corrie Dicks
Adam Woolnough		Coach		Adam Houston

This double-header was part of a triple-header which also featured a Men's U-19 between the same nations.

== March ==
=== Wales wheelchair v UK Armed Forces ===
14 March 2026
14:00 GMT (UTC+00:00)

Wales	42–24†	UK Armed Forces
Tries: Turner (2, 8), Williams (6, 10, 14, 21, 26); Goals: Preece 7/7	1st: 42–0; 2nd: 0–24; Report	Tries: Simpson-Hill (52, 73), Wells (58, 64); Goals: Sampher 4/4

Wrexham University Sports Centre, Wrexham
Referee: Kim Abel, Ewan Clibbens

This was part of a double-header which also featured the 'A' sides of Wales and the UK Armed Forces.

== May ==
=== Celtic Cup (wheelchair) ===
23 May 2026
11:00 BST (UTC+01:00)

Scotland	40–70	Ireland
Tries: Owen (17, 26, 66), Davidson (34, 42), Japes (48), Robertson (61); Goals: Davidson 4/5, Robertson 2/2	Report	Tries: Horgan (2, 5, 31), Burton-Carter (8, 39), Johnston (15, 16), Griffith (21), Martin (39, 58), Calcott (44, 53), Noonan (62); Goals: Horgan 0/1, Burton-Carter 1/2, Johnston 7/7, Spain 1/1, Martin 0/2

Oriam Performance Centre, Edinburgh

23 May 2026
13:00 BST (UTC+01:00)

Wales	38–50	Ireland
Tries: S. Williams (14, 42), Turner (24, 30), Boyd-Ward (29), Jamie Reynolds (54, 77); Goals: Turner 5/7	Report	Tries: Calcott (1, 64, 69), Johnston (9, 12), Horgan (17, 38), Mangan (41, 52); Goals: Johnston 4/6, Burton-Carter 3/3

Oriam Performance Centre, Edinburgh

23 May 2026
15:00 BST (UTC+01:00)

Scotland	46–50	Wales
Tries: Hill (22), Davidson (28, 44, 46, 76), Owen (39, 50, 69), King (60); Goals: Davidson 5/8, Douglas 0/1	Report	Tries: S. Williams (7), Turner (9, 14), Sargent (12, 23, 40), Jason Reynolds (34), Ramsey (56, 63); Goals: Turner 7/9

Oriam Performance Centre, Edinburgh

== June ==
=== Vanuatu men v Singapore ===
6 June 2026
13:00 VUT (UTC+11:00)

Vanuatu	30–24†	Singapore
	Report

Korman Stadium, Port Vila

=== German Exiles v Brazil men ===
28 June 2026
12:00 BST (UTC+01:00)

German Exiles	49–34†	Brazil
Tries: Bilsborough, Wood, Burke, Fairhead, Smith, Whitaker, McConnell, Kay, Robinson, Dempsey; Goals: Bilsborough (3), McConnell (1); Drop goals: Bilsborough	Report	Tries: B. Godwin (2), Tolen, O. Godwin, Silva, Mitton; Goals: Schofield (5)

Cougar Park, Keighley
Referee: Gary Lancaster (England)

Team details
German Exiles		Position	Brazil
Name	Number	Position	Number	Name
George Wood	1	FB	1	Harley Nicholson
Jason Kay	2	WG	2	Aiden Tolen
Shaun Smith	3	CE	3	Ben Godwin
Zach Burke	4	CE	4	Keigan Cumberland
William Fairhead	5	WG	5	Carlos Henrique
Josh McConnell	6	SO	6	Reece Schofield
Brad Bilsborough	7	SH	7	Jack Humphries
Jamie Blakestone	8	PR	8	Heron Godoi
Martin Robinson	9	HK	9	Ben Jones
Jordan Williams	10	PF	10	Alyfer Vinicus
Aaron Williams	11	SR	11	Ciaran Mylod
Scott Wilson	12	SR	12	Chayse Quigley
Andy Hoggins	13	LF	13	Harvey Mitton
Oliver Bowie	14	IN	14	Scott Davies
Drew Malcolm	15	IN	15	Oliver Godwin
James Whittaker	16	IN	16	Finn Gamble
Steve Brinkley	17	IN	17	Luke Fisher
Joshua Pengel	18	Interchange	18	Arjun Chhbra
Lewis Dempsey	19	RES	19	Lukas Silva
Lewis Wilson	20	IN

Played as a double-header with the Championship fixture between Keighley Cougars and Swinton Lions.

== July ==
=== Canada men's European summer tour ===
2 July 2026
18:00 CEST (UTC+02:00)

Norway	6–56	Canada
Tries: Milligan (37); Goals: Kjaerstad (1/1)	1st: 6–22; 2nd: 0–34; Report	Tries: Chuck (1, 9), Harrison (20), Murphy (30, 55), Mahović (46, 49), Fish (62), Wicken (68), Lebel (76); Goals: Harrison (8/10)

Vigernesjordet, Lillestrøm
Referee: Joseph Rago (Norway)

Team details
Norway		Position	Canada
Name	Number	Position	Number	Name
Denis Galic	1	FB	1	Oliver Lenahan
Magnus Soiland	2	WG	2	Jalen Harrison
Lucas Zuniga	3	CE	3	Fynn Murphy
Martin Hogmoe	4	CE	4	Blake Marshall
Idar Kjaerstad	5	WG	5	Richard Lebel
Kristoffer Milligan	6	SO	6	Toby Horn
Stephen Mwikaria	7	SH	7	Blake Mahovic
Rob Adams	8	PR	8	Matthew Fish
Jamie Ward	9	HK	9	Nathan Roberts
Havard Tjetland	10	PF	10	Charles Curran
Kevin Batnes	11	SR	11	Augustus Murphy
Oliver Falk	12	SR	12	Jason Chuck
Nils Holte	13	LF	13	Mitchell Talbot
Isuf Peci	14	IN	14	Kyle Yurkiw
Mikal Berghom Ousdal	15	IN	15	Luka Wicken
Mathias Stenseth-Holm	16	IN	16	Doug Howard
Andreas Skifjeld	17	IN	17	Dillon Goos
		RES	18	Thomas Dickinson
Tim Jones		Coach		Aaron Zimmerle

5 July 2026
15:00 BST (UTC+01:00)

Scotland	22–10	Canada
Tries: Slader (2, 49), Moran (29), Cullen (34), Bentley (42); Goals: Shannon (1/5), Lowe (0/1)	1st: 14–6; 2nd: 8–4; Report	Tries: Roberts (4), Fish (57); Goals: Harrison (1/2)

Hawick RFC, Hawick
Referee: Denton Arnold (England)

Team details
Scotland		Position	Canada
Name	Number	Position	Number	Name
Tom Gray	1	FB	1	Oliver Lenahan
Cameron Cullen	2	WG	2	Jalen Harrison
Connor Slader	3	CE	3	Fynn Murphy
Jacob Grierson	4	CE	4	Luka Wicken
Roserutabua Tawanayavulala	5	WG	5	Richard Lebel
George Shannon	6	SO	6	Toby Horn
Joseph Lowe	7	SH	7	Blake Mahovic
Conner Terrill	8	PR	8	Matthew Fish
Ross Whitmore	9	HK	9	Nathan Roberts
Kieran Moran	10	PF	10	Charles Curran
Gregor Cowan	11	SR	11	Augustus Murphy
Hamish Bentley	12	SR	12	Jason Chuck
Oliver Maher	13	LF	13	Mitchell Talbot
Ben Morris	14	IN	14	Jacob Bourne
Naill Hall	15	IN	15	Jordan Cella
Jordan Duncan	16	IN	16	Doug Howard
Andrew Brown	17	IN	17	Michael Snook
Lachlann Forsyth	18	RES	18	Gregory Wise
Adam Houston		Coach		Aaron Zimmerle

11 July 2026
14:00 CEST (UTC+02:00)

Netherlands	6–34	Canada
Tries: Schuiling (75); Goals: Baats (1/1)	1st: 0–22; 2nd: 6–12; Report	Tries: Horn (7), Murphy (9), Chuck (19), Fish (27), Roberts (35), Wicken (79); Goals: Horn (5/6)

Rotterdamse RC Beekweg, Rotterdam
Referee: Moray Gilland (Scotland)

Team details
Netherlands		Position	Canada
Name	Number	Position	Number	Name
Dimitri Haringa	1	FB	1	Gregory Wise
Miquel Raven	2	WG	2	Fynn Murphy
Hidde Van De Berg	3	CE	3	Ewan Lawton
Mike Prins	4	CE	4	Richard Lebel
Arie Razoux-Schultz	5	WG	5	Luka Wicken
Paul Kuijpers	6	SO	6	Thomas Dickinson
Kees Kuijpers	7	SH	7	Toby Horn
Joris Van Lankveld	8	PR	8	Matthew Fish
Rick Baats	9	HK	9	Nathan Roberts
Robin Raaijmakers	10	PF	10	Charles Curran
Kwinten Roeleveld	11	SR	11	Augustus Murphy
Rowan Schuiling	12	SR	12	Doug Howard
Sylvan Vonken	13	LF	13	Jason Chuck
Max Van De Stroom	14	IN	14	Kyle Yurkiw
Francis Appleton	15	IN	15	Michael Snook
Bert Kuypers	16	IN	16	Garin Nicholls
Sam Klumpert	17	IN	17	Ethan Chantler
Shaden Lavia	18	RES	18	Mitchell Talbot
James Adams		Coach		Aaron Zimmerle

=== England men v Papua New Guinea ===
A proposed mid-season game between England and Papua New Guinea did not occur following the RFL's U-turn decision to use the spare week in the UK domestic calendar (4/5 July) to retain Magic Weekend for 2026 as a sole loop fixture. Magic Weekend had previously been set to be removed following Super League's expansion to 14 teams and the subsequent removal of loop fixtures (which included Magic Weekend) from the competition.

=== New Zealand at the NRL Wheelchair Championship ===
10 to 12 July

- New Zealand finished 4th:
  - Lost 6–28 against New South Wales
  - Lost 12–40 against North Queensland
  - Won 28–0 against (South Australia) (Western Australia) (Northern Territory) Affiliated States
  - Won 44–0 against (Victoria (state)) Victoria
  - Lost 6–16 against Australian Capital Territory
  - Lost 14–24 against Queensland

=== France wheelchair v Ireland ===
11 July 2026
16:30 CEST (UTC+02:00)

France	106–16	Ireland
Tries: Alazard (5, 28, 35, 76), Dore (9, 56, 67), Dananchy (22, 30, 38), Clausells (24), Denuwaelere (41, 64), Penella (50, 72), Guttadoro (53, 60), Seixas (69); Goals: Alazard (17/18)	Report	Tries: Calcott (9), Burton-Carter (20), Horgan (63); Goals: Burton-Carter (0/1), Johnston (2/2)

Halle Marcel Cerdan, Perpignan
Referees: Laurent Bonnet (France), David Butler (England)

Team details
France		Position	Ireland
Name	Number	Position	Number	Name
Jerome Seixas	1	Starter	1	Joseph Calcott
Julien Penella	2	Starter	2	Cian Horgan
Damien Dore	3	Starter	3	James McCarthy
Florien Guttadoro	4	Starter	4	Toby Burton-Carter
Lionel Alazard	5	Starter	5	Peter Johnson
Thibaud Dananchy	6	Interchange	6	Oran Spain
Dany Denuwaelere	7	Interchange	7	Thomas Martin
Nicolas Clausells	8	Interchange	8	Jack Mangan
Cyril Torres		Coach		Phil Roberts

12 July 2026
18:00 CEST (UTC+02:00)

France	66–36	Ireland
Tries: Hivernat (13, 43, 68, 70), Zittel (32), Clausells (37, 53, 63), Gelade Panzo (47, 76, 78); Goals: Clausells (5/5), Hivernat (6/7)	1st: 20–26; 2nd: 46–10; Report	Tries: McCarthy (5, 10, 18, 22, 59), Horgan (28, 57); Goals: Horgan (4/7)

Halle Marcel Cerdan, Perpignan
Referees: David Roig (France), Fabien Lartigues (France)

Team details
France		Position	Ireland
Name	Number	Position	Number	Name
Adrien Zittel	1	Starter	1	Cian Horgan
Gilles Clausells	2	Starter	2	Jack Mangan
Guillaume Dubruel	3	Starter	3	James Mccarthy
Jeremy Bourson	4	Starter	4	Joseph Calcott
Leo Hivernat	5	Starter	5	Melanie Griffith
Jorge Gelade Panzo	6	Interchange	6	Oran Spain
Leo Hivernat	7	Interchange	7	Peter Johnston
William Drouard	8	Interchange	8	Phil Roberts
Jonathan Hivernat	9	Reserve	9	Thomas Martin
Cyril Torres		Coach		Phil Roberts

=== Brazil men v University of Oxford ===
11 July 2026
14:00 BRT (UTC-03:00)

Brazil	42–19†	University of Oxford R.L.F.C.
	Report

Parque das Águas, São Lourenço

=== Ghana men v University of Cambridge ===
12 July 2026
15:00 GMT (UTC+00:00)

Ghana	4–12	University of Cambridge R.L.F.C.
	Report

University of Ghana Rugby Stadium, Accra

=== Canada women's European summer tour ===
19 July 2026
15:00 BST (UTC+01:00)

Wales	0–14	Canada
	1st: 0–10; 2nd: 0–4; Report	Tries: Franada (20), Pakulis (33, 37); Goals: Naismith (1/3)

The Gnoll, Neath
Referee: James Jones (Wales)

NB: Match played to Australia's 70 minute rule for women's rugby league per request of Wales.

25 July 2026
13:00 BST (UTC+01:00)

Scotland	4–34	Canada
Tries: Cox (9); Goals: Smart (0/1)	1st: 4–14; 2nd: 0–20; Report	Tries: Franada (14), Scott (25), Woods (30), Aberg (48, 68), Hindley (77); Goals: Naismith (3/7)

Hawick RFC, Hawick
Referee: Tyler Topping (England)

=== France women v England ===
25 July 2026
18:00 CEST (UTC+02:00)

France	4–38	England
Goals: Diraison (2/2)	1st: 4–28; 2nd: 0–10; Report	Tries: Derbyshire (17, 62), Murray (23,28), Donnelly (32), Hunter (34), Foubister (48); Goals: Rowe (5/7)

Stade Ernest Wallon, Toulouse
Attendance: 7,024
Referee: Stephane Vincent (France)

Played as a double-header with the men's Super League fixture between Toulouse Olympique and Catalans Dragons.

NB: Match played to Australia's 70 minute rule for women's rugby league per request of both teams.

== August ==
=== France women v Nigeria ===
1 August 2026
18:00 CEST (UTC+02:00)

France	36–8	Nigeria
Tries: Kessely (2, 22, 31, 55), Andral (38), Samarra (58), Akpa (59); Goals: Dirasison (4/6)	1st: 14–4; 2nd: 22–4; Report	Tries: Bayere (9), Okitikpe (44); Goals: Innocent (0/1), Mene (0/1)

Stade Gilbert Brutus, Perpignan
Attendance: 7,951
Referee: Geoffrey Poumes (France)

Played as a double-header with the men's Super League fixture between Catalans Dragons and Wakefield Trinity.

NB: Match played to Australia's 70 minute rule for women's rugby league per request of France.

== September ==
=== Griffin Cup ===
12 September 2026
14:00 CEST (UTC+02:00)

Netherlands	14–28	Germany
Tries: Baats (5), Kuijpers (48), van den Berg (55); Goals: Baats (1/3)	1st: 4–16; 2nd: 10–12; Report	Tries: Hoggins (9, 20), Schmidt (34, 79), Wood (75); Goals: Billsborough (4/5)

Zaandijk Rugby Club, Zaandam
Referee: Hans Verveer (Netherlands)

=== Malta women v Lebanon in Australia ===
26 September 2026
19:00 AEST (UTC+10:00)

Malta	10–26	Lebanon
Tries: Cassar (7), Xerri (37); Goals: Cassar (1/2)	1st: 10–10; 2nd: 0–16; Report	Tries: El-Abdallah (12), Saba (13), Nadaya-Harb (47), Melham (62), Rifei (78); Goals: Nadaya-Harb (3/5)

Collegians Sports & Performance Centre, Sydney
Referee: Thomas Inness

== October ==
=== Men's European Championships ===
==== Euro B ====
18 October 2026
14:00 CEST (UTC+02:00)

Serbia	14–30	Ukraine
Tries: Pavlović (7), Ditchmen (54), Walker (67); Goals: Walker (1/3)	1st: 4–24; 2nd: 10–6; Report	Tries: Beggs-Mowczan (20, 30), Puchkov (27), Fomiuk (35), Sluvinsky (48); Goals: Skorbach (5/5)

FK Zemun Stadium, Belgrade
Attendance: ~300
Referee: Andrew Pilkington (Spain)

21 October 2026
14:00 CEST (UTC+02:00)

Ukraine	22–28	Netherlands
Tries: Sciglitano (10), Skorbach (38), Beggs-Mowczan (43), Kolisnyk (56), Fomiuk (76); Goals: Diachenko (0/1), Skorbach (1/4)	1st: 10–16; 2nd: 12–12; Report	Tries: Niumata (15), Koolstra (21, 67), Kuijpers (30), Keating (71); Goals: Koolstra (2/3), Baats (2/2)

FK Zemun Stadium, Belgrade
Referee: Petar Randjelović (Serbia)

24 October 2026
14:00 CEST (UTC+02:00)

Netherlands	38–30	Serbia
Tries: Razoux-Schultz (3, 48), Haringa (7), R. Barbuto (13), Kuijpeters (46), Vonken (57), M. Barbuto (63); Goals: Koolstra (5/6), Baats (0/1)	1st: 14–16; 2nd: 24–14; Report	Tries: Walker (?), Pavlović (10, 72), Saban (15), Pipović (29, 41), Vuković (59); Goals: Walker (2/5), Jasari (1/1)

FK Zemun Stadium, Belgrade
Referee: Andrew Pilkington (Spain)

==== Euro C ====
3 October 2026
14:00 CEST (UTC+02:00)

Germany	28–29	Malta
Tries: Adams (4), Kay (15), Smith (20, 19), McConnell (43); Goals: Rau (3/5)	1st: 22–12; 2nd: 6–17; Report	Tries: Gatt (9), Galea (30, 48, 60), Strickland (50); Goals: Galea (1/1), Sammut (2/4); Drop goals: Sammut (1/1)

Sportsplatz Welper, Hattingen
Attendance: > 500
Referee: Misa Vakadranu (Fiji)

10 October 2026
18:00 CEST (UTC+02:00)

Malta	18–20	Greece
Tries: Mamo (29), Gatt (45, 79); Goals: Sammut (3/3)	1st: 6–10; 2nd: 12–10; Report	Tries: Stratis (17), Markopolous, (36, 62), Tsagalios (50); Goals: Stratis (2/4)

Hibernians Rugby Pitch, Paola
Referee: Ollie Maddock (England)

17 October 2026
16:00 EEST (UTC+03:00)

Greece	68–14	Germany
Tries: Tuliatu (14), Markopolous (19), Linoxylakis (30), Bakis (37, 59), Tsagalios (43, 46, 52), Stratis (50), Chionis (55, 62), Aliu (68); Goals: Stratis (10/12)	1st: 26–10; 2nd: 42–4; Report	Tries: Esser (7, 75), Hoggins (27); Goals: Rau (1/2), Adams (0/1)

Elena Venizelou Stadium, Chania
Referee: Nectarios Tsakalos (Greece)

==== Euro D ====
17 October 2026
15:00 CEST (UTC+02:00)

Norway	6–40	Italy
Tries: Silverstone-Utheim (76); Goals: Vagen (1/1)	1st: 0–24; 2nd: 6–16; Report	Tries: Colla (8), Decaro (11, 36), S. Ngeng (30, 73), S. E. Ngeng (55), Brugel (68); Goals: Astolfi (6/7)

Øster Hus Arena, Sandnes
Referee: Carl Hughes (England)

24 October 2026
15:00 CEST (UTC+02:00)

Italy	46–38	Czechia
Tries: Scalabrini (9), S. E. Ngeng (13, 36, 44, 51, 62), Falaniko (34), S. Ngeng (78); Goals: Astolfi (7/8)	1st: 22–20; 2nd: 24–18; Report	Tries: Adamec (15, 28), Chuchlik (29, 47), Novotny (39), Schejbal (67, 71); Goals: Adamec (5/7)

Abbiategrasso Rugby Club, Abbiategrasso
Referee: Misa Vakrandu

31 October 2026
14:00 CET (UTC+01:00)

Czechia	68–26	Norway
Tries: Moravek (4, 34, 75), Spidlen (31, 68), Hudrilik (37, 42), Studecky (50), Adamec (57), Schejbal (60, 62), Poner (65); Goals: Hudrilik (10/12)	1st: 24–16; 2nd: 44–10; Report	Tries: Zuniga (17), Holte (23), Falk (28, 79), Hoeyland (54); Goals: Hoeyland (3/5)

Stadion HZS, Hradec Kralove
Referee: Misa Vakrandu

=== Cook Islands women v Tonga in Australia ===
10 October 2026
16:00 AEST (UTC+10:00)

Cook Islands	24–36	Tonga
Tries: Glassie (1, 13), Sekene (19, 33), Willie (61); Goals: Birch (1/3), Matua (1/2)	1st: 20–10; 2nd: 4–26; Preview	Tries: Polata (27, 55), Finau (29), Sikahele (43), Feleti (48), Gesa (65), Hopoate (74); Goals: Feleti (2/2), Kavapalu (2/5)

St Mary's Stadium, Sydney
Referee: Matthew Galvin (Australia)

=== Canada men v Jamaica ===
10 October 2026
18:00 EDT (UTC-04:00)

Canada	42–6	Jamaica
Tries: Lenahan (8, 72), Kosempel (17, 32), Mahović (27, 79), Keegel (33), Curran (63); Goals: Lenahan (6/8)	1st: 26–0; 2nd: 16–6; Report	Tries: Hall (69); Goals: Green (1/2)

Terry Fox Stadium, Brampton

=== Greece women v Jamaica ===
17 October 2026
14:00 EEST (UTC+03:00)

Greece	6–20	Jamaica
Tries: Anagnostopoulou (75); Goals: Kalomenopoulou (1/1)	1st: 0–0; 2nd: 6–20; Report	Tries: McPherson (44), Bell (56, 65); Goals: Blair (4/5)

Elene Venizelou Stadium, Chania
Referee: David Brown (Greece)

=== Netherlands women v Scotland ===
17 October 2026
14:00 CEST (UTC+02:00)

Netherlands	0–54	Scotland
	1st: 0–38; 2nd: 0–16; Report	Tries: Simpson (8), Tonkin (12, 74), Smart (15, 29, 72), Kendrick-Naylor (23), Welsford (32, 65), Newbigging (37); Goals: Smart (7/10)

Castricum Rugby Club, Castricum
Referee: Misa Vakadranu (Fiji)

=== Wales men v the United States ===
17 October 2026
14:30 BST (UTC+01:00)

Wales	44–12	United States
Tries: Jones (3, 22, 39), Owen (13), Restall (34), Dickenson (54), Woodford (61), Clarke (71), Fozard (76); Goals: Newton (4/8), Fozard (0/1)	1st: 26–12; 2nd: 18–0; Report	Tries: Hlanguyo (9), Povey (28); Goals: Vidot (2/2)

The Wern, Merthyr Tydfil
Attendance: 1,050
Referee: Kristoff Young (Wales)

=== Celtic Cup (men's) ===
17 October 2026
15:00 BST (UTC+01:00)

Scotland	12–46	Ireland
Tries: Terrill (28), Whitmore (71); Goals: Lowe (2/2)	1st: 6–22; 2nd: 6–24; Report	Tries: Whitford (4, 54), Wing (16), Moran (20), Barrett (39), McGowan, (51), Lynch (63), Roberts (79); Goals: Farrar (7/8)

Hawick RFC, Hawick
Referee: Kevin Moore (England)

24 October 2026
13:00 BST (UTC+01:00)

Scotland	0–38	Wales
	1st: 0–22; 2nd: 0–16; Report	Tries: Ingram (7, 68), Jones (10), Butt (12), Grice (16), Woodford (27), Walker (53), Garmston (58); Goals: Newton (3/5), Fozard (0/3)

Biggar RFC, Biggar

31 October 2026
15:00 GMT (UTC+00:00)

Wales	24–6	Ireland
Tries: Garmston (9), Owen (13), Connor (31), Ingram (66); Goals: Newton (3/4)	1st: 16–0; 2nd: 8–6; Report	Tries: McGowan (50); Goals: Barton (1/1)

The Wern, Merthyr Tydfil
Referee: Ryan Cox (England)

=== Malta women v Philippines in Australia ===
25 October 2026
15:00 AEST (UTC+10:00)

Malta	30–6	Philippines
Tries: Figallo (3), Taofoi (15, 53, 73), Cassar (25), Shuker (35), Sant (69); Goals: McGregor (0/6), Coppini (1/1)	1st: 16–6; 2nd: 14–0; Report	Tries: Horvat (19); Goals: Mccue (1/1)

Croom Oval, Croom

=== Men's World Cup ===
==== Group A ====
15 October 2026
20:05 AEDT (UTC+11:00)

Australia	24–22	New Zealand
Tries: 5 Bostock 19', 56', 75'; Trbojevic 30'; Walsh 68'; Goals: 2 Walsh (2/4) 32', 57'; Mitchell (0/1); Sin bin: Staggs (yellow card) 37' to 47'	1st: 10–10; 2nd: 14–12; Report (NRL); Report (IRL)	Tries: 3 McLean 3'; Ponga 46', 59'; Goals: 5 Isaako (5/5) 5', pen 25', pen 38', 48', 61'

Sydney Football Stadium, Sydney
Attendance: 41,255
Referee: Adam Gee (Australia)
Video referee: Chris Butler (Australia)
Touch judges: Matt Noyen (Australia), Tyson Brough (Australia)
Player of the Match: Jack Bostock (Australia)

18 October 2026
16:05 AEDT (UTC+11:00)

Fiji	40–12	Cook Islands
Tries: 7 Saukuru 5', 69'; Blake 12'; Saifiti 28'; Milne 35'; Navale 37'; Kautoga 47'; Goals: 6 Wakeham (6/7) 7', 13', 30', 36', 48', 71'	1st: 28–0; 2nd: 12–12; Report (NRL); Report (IRL)	Tries: 2 Winitana-Patelesio 59'; Moale 63'; Goals: 2 Winitana-Patelesio (2/2) 60', 64'

Newcastle International Sports Centre, Newcastle
Attendance: 10,604
Referee: Chris Kendall (England)
Video referee: Wyatt Raymond (Australia)
Touch judges: Drew Oultram (Australia), Jon Stone (Australia)
Player of the Match: Brandon Wakeham (Fiji)

25 October 2026
18:05 NZDT (UTC+12:00)

New Zealand	82–16	Cook Islands
Tries: 14; Isaako 1', 23', 73'; Mulitalo 6', 64'; Sorensen 27'; Stowers-Smith 32', 49'; McLean 37', 58'; Kini 42'; Nikorima 51'; Martin 76'; Nicoll-Klokstad 77'; Goals: 13; Isaako (13/14) 3', 8', 24', 28', 34', 39', 44', 50', 53', 58', 75', 76', 78'	1st: 36–16; 2nd: 46–0; Report (NRL); Report (IRL)	Tries: 3 Ioka 10', 14', 18'; Goals: 2 Holmes (2/3) 16', 19'

Te Kaha Stadium, Christchurch
Attendance: 24,868 (Note: Match attendance was posted as 26,800 by several difference sources, but NRL website lists it officially as 24,868)
Referee: Ashley Klein (Australia)
Video referee: Wyatt Raymond
Touch judges: Jon Stone (Australia), Drew Oultram (Australia)
Player of the Match: Casey McLean (New Zealand)

25 October 2026
19:05 AEST (UTC+10:00)

Australia	36–22	Fiji
Tries: 6 Staggs 7'; Walker 33'; Trbojevic 47', 57', 62'; Preston 76'; Goals: 6 Walker (6/7) 9', 34', pen 54', 58', 63', 78'	1st: 12–10; 2nd: 24–12; Report (NRL); Report (IRL)	Tries: 4 Valemei 17', 43', 69'; Milne 25'; Goals: 3 Wakeham (3/4) 26', 44', 71'

Lang Park, Brisbane
Attendance: 41,108
Referee: Gerard Sutton (Australia)
Video referee: Chris Butler (Australia)
Touch judges: Nick Pelgrave (Australia), Michael Wise (Australia)
Player of the Match: Kurt Donoghoe (Fiji)

31 October 2026
14:45 AEST (UTC+10:00)

New Zealand	78–0	Fiji
Tries: 13; Hughes 1'; Kini 4', 78'; McLean 8', 25', 55', 61'; Gagai 11'; Fisher-Harris 19'; Mulitalo 29'; Willison 32'; Nikora 63'; Clark 72'; Goals: 13; Isaako (13/13) 3', 5', 10', 12', 21', 26', 30', 34', 57', 62', 65', 73', 79'; Sent off: Mulitalo (red card) 51'	1st: 48–0; 2nd: 30–0; Report (NRL); Report (IRL)	Sin bin: Miller (yellow card) 77' to 80'; Sent off: Wakeham (red card) 51'

Robina Stadium, Gold Coast
Attendance: 23,659
Referee: Grant Atkins (Australia)
Video referee: Todd Smith (Australia)
Touch judges: Jarrod Cole (Australia), Kieren Irons (Australia)
Player of the Match: Naufahu Whyte (New Zealand)

31 October 2026
19:05 AEST (UTC+10:00)

Australia	66–6	Cook Islands
Tries: 12; Bostock 2', 44', 59'; Trbojevic 17', 47', 57'; Fa'asuamaleaui 20', 54'; Staggs 26'; Walsh 30'; Preston 51'; Grant 77'; Goals: 9 Walsh (3/4) 18', 21', 27'; Munster (5/7) 32', 46', 53', 56', 58'; Strange (1/1) 79'	1st: 28–6; 2nd: 38–0; Report (NRL); Report (IRL)	Tries: 1 Ngatikaura 8'; Goals: 1 Holmes (1/1) 10'

North Queensland Stadium, Townsville
Attendance: 19,172
Referee: Ashley Klein (Australia)
Video referee: Chris Butler (Australia)
Touch judges: Michael Wise (Australia), Nick Pelgrave (Australia)
Player of the Match: Reece Walsh (Australia)

==== Group B and C ====
16 October 2026
17:45 AEDT (UTC+11:00)

Samoa	78–4	France
Tries: 14; Mariner 2'; Ioelu 5', 80'; McEwen 7'; Fa'alogo 13', 36', 63', 67'; Tabuai-Fidow 17'; Crichton 42'; Blore 55'; Harris-Tavita 70'; Tago 74'; Molo 77'; Goals: 11; Crichton (11/15) 4', 6', 8', 19', 38', 44', 57', 71', 76', 78', 80'	1st: 34–4; 2nd: 44–0; Report (NRL); Report (IRL)	Tries: 1 Aispuro-Bichet 24'; Goals: 0 Mourgue (0/1)

Western Sydney Stadium, Sydney
Attendance: 13,174
Referee: Ashley Klein (Australia)
Video referee: Chris Butler (Australia)
Touch judges: Kieron Irons (Australia), Daniel Luttringer (Australia)
Player of the Match: Francis Manuleleua (Samoa)

17 October 2026
14:25 PNGST (UTC+11:00)

Papua New Guinea	42–18	Lebanon
Tries: 7 Voro 7'; Derby 19'; Putt 30'; Glare 42'; Kapinias 47'; Martin 71'; Biondi-Odo 74'; Goals: 7 Martin (7/7) 8', 21', 31', 43', 49', 72', 74'	1st: 18–12; 2nd: 24–6; Report (NRL); Report (IRL)	Tries: 3 Miski 35', 53'; Sukkar 39'; Goals: 3 Conti (3/3) 37', 40', 55'

PNG Football Stadium, Port Moresby
Attendance: 11,624
Referee: Grant Atkins (Australia)
Video referee: Liam Kennedy (Australia)
Touch judges: Jarrod Cole (Australia), Jarrod Cole (Australia)
Player of the Match: Gairo Voro (Papua New Guinea)

17 October 2026
17:05 AWST (UTC+08:00)

England	12–30	Tonga
Tries: 2 Brimson 45'; Young 62'; Goals: 2 Savala (2/2) 47', 63'	1st: 0–10; 2nd: 12–20; Report (NRL); Report (IRL)	Tries: 4 Utoikamanu 23'; Olakau'atu 52', 70'; Koula 55'; Goals: 8 Katoa (7/8) 24', pen 27', pen 39', 53', 57', pen 60', pen 75'

Perth Rectangular Stadium, Perth
Attendance: 18,302
Referee: Gerard Sutton (Australia)
Video referee: Ashley Klein (Australia)
Touch judges: Ziggy Przeklasa-Adamski (Australia), Adam Munroe (Australia)
Player of the Match: Isaiya Katoa (Tonga)

23 October 2026
20:05 AEDT (UTC+11:00)

Tonga	36–0	Lebanon
Tries: 7 Katoa 12', 79'; Alamoti 20'; Koula 36'; Fifita 43', 73'; Halasima 69'; Goals: 4 Alamoti (1/4) 21'; Lolohea (3/3) 70', 74', 79'	1st: 14–0; 2nd: 22–0; Report (NRL); Report (IRL)

Western Sydney Stadium, Sydney
Attendance: 25,065
Referee: Liam Moore (England)
Video referee: Grant Atkins (Australia)
Touch judges: Ziggy Przeklasa-Adamski (Australia), Jarrod Cole (Australia)
Player of the Match: Tolutau Koula (Tonga)

24 October 2026
14:25 PNGST (UTC+11:00)

Papua New Guinea	6–64	Samoa
Tries: 1 Biondi-Odo 18'; Goals: 1 Martin (1/1) 18'; Sin bin: Derby (yellow card) 63' to 73'	1st: 6–14; 2nd: 0–50; Report (NRL); Report (IRL)	Tries: 13; Fa'alogo 1', 44'; Leniu 30'; Crichton 36'; Manuleleua 47'; Tabuai-Fidow 52', 68'; To'o 58'; Blore 65', 77'; Volkman 66'; Tago 70'; Mariota 79'; Goals: 6 Crichton (1/3) 30'; Harris-Tavita (2/6) 46', 67'; Volkman (3/4) 70', 72', 79'

PNG Football Stadium, Port Moresby
Attendance: 15,008
Referee: Chris Kendall (England)
Video referee: Liam Kennedy (Australia)
Touch judges: Kieren Irons (Australia), Daniel Luttringer (Australia)
Player of the Match: Francis Manuleleua (Samoa)

24 October 2026
14:35 AWST (UTC+08:00)

England	82–0	France
Tries: 14; Young 22', 45', 63'; Ashton 24'; Farnworth 26', 34', 39'; Williams 37'; Radley 48'; Litten 58'; Lewis 62', 68'; Welsby 66'; Brimson 77'; Goals: 13; Savala (13/14) 23', 25', 27', 36', 38', 39', 49', 59', 63', 65', 66', 69', 77'	1st: 36–0; 2nd: 46–0; Report (NRL); Report (IRL)

Perth Rectangular Stadium, Perth
Attendance: 10,723
Referee: Adam Gee (Australia)
Video referee: Chris Butler (Australia)
Touch judges: Jon Stone (Australia), Matt Noyen (Australia)
Player of the Match: AJ Brimson (England)

30 October 2026
20:05 AEDT (UTC+11:00)

England	34–12	Papua New Guinea
Tries: 6 Ashton 5'; Brimson 11'; Young 18'; Smith 20'; Knowles 68'; Lewis 79'; Goals: 5 Savala (4/5) 6', 12', 21', pen 39'; Smith (1/2) 68'	1st: 24–0; 2nd: 10–12; Report (NRL); Report (IRL)	Tries: 2 Dotoi 44'; Voro 50'; Goals: 2 Martin (2/2) 46', 51'

Wollongong Showground, Wollongong
Attendance: 15,063
Referee: Gerard Sutton (Australia)
Video referee: Todd Smith (Australia)
Touch judges: Dave Munro (Australia), Drew Oultram (Australia)
Player of the Match: Kai Pearce-Paul (England)

1 November 2026
17:50 AEDT (UTC+11:00)

Lebanon	24–20 (g.p.)	France
Tries: 4 Conti 3'; Gabrael 45'; Francis 60'; Miski 84'; Goals: 4 Conti (4/6) 5', pen 24', 47', pen 75'; Sin bin: Twal (yellow card) 76' to 84'	1st: 8–6; 2nd: 12–14; Golden point: 4–0; Report (NRL); Report (IRL)	Tries: 3 Bourouh 31'; Aispuro-Bichet 52'; Rouge 70'; Goals: 3 Mourgue (3/3) 32', 54', 71'; Field goals: 1 Mourgue 2pt 79'; Sin bin: Bousquet (yellow card) 76' to 84'

Western Sydney Stadium, Sydney (Note: Match was a double-header with the Tonga v Samoa fixture.)
Attendance: 29,411
Referee: Liam Moore (England)
Video referee: Todd Smith (Australia)
Touch judges: Matt Noyen (Australia), Jon Stone (Australia)
Player of the Match: Alex Conti (Lebanon)

1 November 2026
20:05 AEDT (UTC+11:00)

Tonga	20–18	Samoa
Tries: 3 Toia 26'; Fifita 45'; Fonua-Blake 72'; Goals: 4 Katoa (4/4) 27', pen 35', 47', 74'	1st: 8–4; 2nd: 12–14; Report (NRL); Report (IRL)	Tries: 4 To'o 37', 50'; Tabuai-Fidow 62'; Volkman 67'; Goals: 1 Harris-Tavita (0/2); Volkman (1/2) 69'

Western Sydney Stadium, Sydney (Note: Match was a double-header with the Lebanon v France fixture.)
Attendance: 29,411
Referee: Adam Gee (Australia)
Video referee: Chris Butler (Australia)
Touch judges: Ziggy Przeklasa-Adamski (Australia), Daniel Luttringer (Australia)
Player of the Match: Robert Toia (Tonga)

==== Semi Finals ====
7 November 2026
20:05 AEDT (UTC+11:00)

New Zealand	34–10	Tonga
Tries: 6 Nikora 3'; Gagai 36'; McLean 47'; Hughes 52'; Willison 69'; Nicoll-Klokstad 79'; Goals: 5 Isaako (5/6) 4', 37', 49', 54', 79'	1st: 12–10; 2nd: 22–0; Report (NRL); Report (IRL)	Tries: 2 Fifita 20', 32'; Goals: 1 Katoa (1/2) 22'

Newcastle International Sports Centre, Newcastle
Attendance: 29,712
Referee: Grant Atkins (Australia)
Video referee: Wyatt Raymond (Australia)
Touch judges: Daniel Luttringer (Australia), Matt Noyen (Australia)
Player of the Match: Kalyn Ponga (New Zealand)

8 November 2026
20:05 AEDT (UTC+11:00)

Australia	44–12	Samoa
Tries: 8 Dearden 7'; Preston 13'; Trbojevic 24'; Walsh 31', 46', 65'; Best 36'; Bostock 71'; Goals: 6 Munster (6/8) 8', 15', 38', 48', 67', 73'	1st: 26–2; 2nd: 18–10; Report (NRL); Report (IRL)	Tries: 2 Crichton 43'; Tago 60'; Goals: 2 Crichton (2/3) pen 4', 44'; Sin bin: Leniu (yellow card) 38' to 48'

Sydney Football Stadium, Sydney
Attendance: 41,529
Referee: Adam Gee (Australia)
Video referee: Chris Butler (Australia)
Touch judges: Ziggy Przeklasa-Adamski (Australia), Tyson Brough (Australia)
Player of the Match: Reece Walsh (Australia)

==== Final ====
15 November 2026
18:35 AEST (UTC+10:00)

Australia	32–12	New Zealand
Tries: 6 Martin 1', 37'; Bostock 18', 76'; Best 31'; Trbojevic 42'; Goals: 4 Munster (4/7) 3', pen 23', 32', 39'	1st: 24–6; 2nd: 8–6; Report (NRL); Report (IRL)	Tries: 2 McLean 11'; Papali'i 65'; Goals: 2 Isaako (2/2) 13', 66'

Lang Park, Brisbane
Attendance: 52,461
Referee: Grant Atkins (Australia)
Video referee: Wyatt Raymond (Australia)
Touch judges: Matt Noyen (Australia), Tyson Brough (Australia)
Player of the Match: Jack Bostock (Australia)

=== Women's World Cup ===
NB: All matches played to Australia's 70 minute rule for women's rugby league.

==== Group A ====
16 October 2026
20:05 AEDT (UTC+11:00)

Australia	40–0	Samoa
Tries: Chapman 10'; Robinson 17'; Bent 22'; Nizza 26'; Kernick 34'; Joseph 44'; Sergis 67'; Goals: Kelleher (6/7)	1st: 28–0; 2nd: 12–0; Report

Western Sydney Stadium, Sydney
Attendance: 13,174
Referee: Kasey Badger (Australia)
Video referee: Peter Gough (Australia)
Touch judges: Karra-Lee Nolan (Australia), Izzy Davidson (Australia)
Player of the Match: Jocelyn Kelleher (Australia)

Team details
Australia		Position	Samoa
Name	Number	Position	Number	Name
Tamika Upton	1	FB	1	Destiny Mino-Sinapati
Jaime Chapman	2	WG	2	Mercedez Taulelei-Siala
Jessica Sergis	3	CE	3	Monica Tagoai
Isabelle Kelly	4	CE	4	Sarina Masaga
Julia Robinson	5	WG	5	Freedom Crichton-Ropati
Jocelyn Kelleher	6	FE	6	Taliah Fuimaono
Tarryn Aiken	7	HB	7	Pauline Piliae-Rasabale
Millie Elliott	8	PR	8	Annetta Nuuausala
Olivia Higgins	9	HK	9	Mary Jane Taito
Simaima Taufa	10	PF	10	Laikha Clarke
Kezie Apps	11	SR	11	Evania Isa'ako
Shaylee Bent	12	SR	12	Ivana Lolesio
Olivia Kernick	13	LK	13	Leilani Wilson
Keeley Nizza	14	IN	14	Evelyn Roberts
Keilee Joseph	15	IN	15	Fanua Rimoni
Tiana Penitani	16	IN	16	Amber Hall
Ellie Johnston	17	IN	17	Jasmine Fogavini
Makenzie Weale	18	RES	18	Tavarna Papalii
Jess Skinner		Coach		Frank Pritchard

17 October 2026
14:35 AWST (UTC+08:00)

England	70–6	Wales
Tries: Brown 2', 56'; Wilson 13'; Boyd 17', 22', 63'; Dodd 19'; Davies 26', 67', 70'; Rowe 35', 47'; Strange 37'; Goals: Rowe (10/13)	1st: 40–6; 2nd: 30–0; Report	Tries: Travis 9'; Goals: Preston (1/1)

Perth Rectangular Stadium, Perth
Attendance: 7,188
Referee: Tara Jones (England)
Video referee: Peter Gough (Australia)
Touch judges: Tori Wilkie (Australia), Rochelle Tamarua (New Zealand)
Player of the Match: Isabel Rowe

Team details
England		Position	Wales
Name	Number	Position	Number	Name
Francesca Goldthorp	1	FB	1	Leanne Burnell
Anna Davies	2	WG	2	Danielle Mcgifford
Georgia Wilson	3	CE	3	Hannah Bluck
Connie Boyd	4	CE	4	Zoe Heeley
Amelia Brown	5	WG	5	Frances Layton
Isabel Rowe	6	SO	6	Ffion Lewis
Georgia Roche	7	SH	7	Tayla Preston
Mary Coleman	8	PR	8	Agnes Wood
Keara Bennett	9	HK	9	Jasmine Gibbons
Hollie Dodd	10	PF	10	Hughes
Jasmin Strange	11	SR	11	Georgia Cussons
Eva Hunter	12	SR	12	Paige Travis
Megan Williams	13	LF	13	Bethan Dainton
Jodie Cunningham	14	IN	14	Carys Marsh
Victoria Whitfield	15	IN	15	Kathryn Salter
Jenna Foubister	16	IN	16	Katie Carr
Hope Millard	17	IN	17	Erin Williams
Liv Wood	18	RES	18	Jade Mullen
Stuart Barrow		Coach		Thomas Brindle

23 October 2026
17:50 AEDT (UTC+11:00)

Samoa	76–0	Wales
Tries: Clarke 8'; Le Ekepati 10', 21', 65'; Sinapati 14, 49'; Hall 25'; Taulelei-Saila 30, 52'; Lolesio 34'; Isa'ako 44'; Tagoai 45'; Ropate 59'; Papalii 78'; Goals: Piliae (10/14)	1st: 40–0; 2nd: 36–0; Report

Western Sydney Stadium, Sydney
Attendance: 3,991
Referee: Rochelle Tamarua (New Zealand)
Video referee: Peter Gough (Australia)
Touch judges: Tara Jones (England), Geoffrey Poumes (France)
Player of the Match: Amber Hall (Samoa)

Team details
Samoa		Position	Wales
Name	Number	Position	Number	Name
Destiny Sinapati	1	FB	1	Leanne Burnell
Mercedez Taulelei-Saila	2	WG	2	Zoe Heeley
Monica Tagoai	3	CE	3	Jade Mullen
Tyra Le Ekepati	4	CE	4	Hannah Bluck
Freedom Ropati	5	WG	5	Sian Williams
Evania Isa'Ako	6	FE/SO	6	Amberley Ruck
Pauline Piliae	7	HB/SH	7	Tayla Preston
Annetta Nuuausala	8	PR	8	Agnes Wood
Mary Jane Taito	9	HK	9	Jasmine Gibbons
Laikha Clarke	10	PF	10	Emily Hughes
Leilani Wilson	11	SR	11	Georgia Cussons
Ivana Lolesio	12	SR	12	Paige Travis
Tavarna Papalii	13	LK/LF	13	Bethan Dainton
Jetaya Faifua	14	IN	14	Carys Marsh
Fanua Rimoni	15	IN	15	Kathryn Salter
Amber Hall	16	IN	16	Erin Williams
Christabelle Onesome-Tuilaepa	17	IN	17	Gracie Hobbs
Jaydika Tafua	18	RES	18	Katie Carr
Frank Pritchard		Coach		Thomas Brindle

24 October 2026
17:05 AWST (UTC+08:00)

Australia	78–0	England
Tries: Chapman 2', 5'; Kelleher 12', 21'; Robinson 15'; Kelly 25', 64'; Church 27', 46'; Aiken 37'; Kernick 39'; Dodd 44'; Weale 50'; Penitiani 53'; Bent 67'; Goals: Kelleher (9/15)	1st: 36–0; 2nd: 42–0; Report

Perth Rectangular Stadium, Perth
Attendance: 13,087
Referee: Belinda Sharpe (Australia)
Video referee: Grant Atkins (Australia)
Touch judges: Dillan Wells (Australia), Karra-Lee Nolan (Australia)
Player of the Match: Olivia Kernick (Australia)

Team details
Australia		Position	England
Name	Number	Position	Number	Name
Tamika Upton	1	FB	1	Francesca Goldthorp
Jaime Chapman	2	WG	2	Anna Davies
Julia Robinson	3	CE	3	Molly Jones
Isabelle Kelly	4	CE	4	Connie Boyd
Abbi Church	5	WG	5	Amelia Brown
Jocelyn Kelleher	6	FE/SO	6	Isabel Rowe
Tarryn Aiken	7	HB/SH	7	Jenna Foubister
Millie Elliott	8	PR	8	Liv Wood
Olivia Higgins	9	HK	9	Keara Bennett
Simaima Taufa	10	PF	10	Hollie Dodd
Tiana Penitani	11	SR	11	Lucy Murray
Shaylee Bent	12	SR	12	Eva Hunter
Olivia Kernick	13	LK/LF	13	Megan Williams
Quincy Dodd	14	IN	14	Jodie Cunningham
Sarah Togatuki	15	IN	15	Victoria Whitfield
Makenzie Weale	16	IN	16	Georgia Roche
Sariah Paki	17	IN	17	Lucie Sams
Ellie Johnston	18	RES	18	Hope Millard
Jess Skinner		Coach		Stuart Barrow

30 October 2026
17:50 AEDT (UTC+11:00)

England	6–24	Samoa
Tries: Cousins 43'; Goals: Roche (1/1)	1st: 0–12; 2nd: 6–12; Report	Tries: Ropati 8', 17', 29'; Taulelei-Saila 37'; Rimoni 65'; Goals: Piliae (2/5)

Wollongong Showground, Wollongong
Attendance: 5,966
Referee: Chris Kendall (England)
Video referee: Adam Gee (Australia)
Touch judges: Dillan Wells (Australia), Karra-Lee Nolan (Australia)
Player of the Match: Freedom Crichton Ropati (Samoa)

Team details
England		Position	Samoa
Name	Number	Position	Number	Name
Francesca Goldthorp	1	FB	1	Destiny Sinapati
Anna Davies	2	WG	2	Mercedez Taulelei-Saila
Georgia Wilson	3	CE	3	Monica Tagoai
Connie Boyd	4	CE	4	Tyra Le Ekepati
Evie Cousins	5	WG	5	Freedom Ropati
Georgia Roche	6	SO/FE	6	Evania Isa'Ako
Isabel Rowe	7	SH/HB	7	Pauline Piliae
Mary Coleman	8	PR	8	Annetta Nuuausala
Keara Bennett	9	HK	9	Mary Jane Taito
Liv Wood	10	PF	10	Laikha Clarke
Hollie Dodd	11	SR	11	Leilani Wilson
Lucy Murray	12	SR	12	Ivana Lolesio
Megan Williams	13	LF/LK	13	Tavarna Papalii
Jodie Cunningham	14	IN	14	Jetaya Faifua
Victoria Whitfield	15	IN	15	Fanua Rimoni
Hope Millard	16	IN	16	Jaydika Tafua
Lucie Sams	17	IN	17	Christabelle Onesome-Tuilaepa
Jenna Foubister	18	RES	18	Jasmine Fogavini
Stuart Barrow		Coach		Frank Pritchard

1 November 2026
15:45 AEDT (UTC+11:00)

Australia	124–6	Wales
Tries: Kernick 5'; Chapman 7', 10', 26', 42', 64', 69'; Church 14', 49'; Southwell 17'; Sergis 19', 29', 38', 53'; Apps 23'; Paki 31'; Joseph 36', 44'; Upton 55', 68'; Nizza 62'; Goals: Southwell (20/21)	1st: 60–0; 2nd: 64–6; Report	Tries: Travis 59'; Goals: Preston (1/1)

Western Sydney Stadium, Sydney
Referee: Kasey Badger (Australia)
Video referee: Peter Gough (Australia)
Touch judges: Karra-Lee Nolan (Australia), Dillan Wells (Australia)
Player of the Match: Jaime Chapman (Australia)

Team details
Australia		Position	Wales
Name	Number	Position	Number	Name
Tamika Upton	1	FB	1	Leanne Burnell
Jaime Chapman	2	WG	2	Zoe Heeley
Jessica Sergis	3	CE	3	Jade Mullen
Isabelle Kelly	4	CE	4	Hannah Bluck
Abbi Church	5	WG	5	Sian Willams
Jesse Southwell	6	FE/SO	6	Ffion Lewis
Tarryn Aiken	7	HB/SH	7	Tayla Preston
Ellie Johnston	8	PR	8	Agnes Wood
Quincy Dodd	9	HK	9	Carys Marsh
Makenzie Weale	10	PF	10	Emily Hughes
Kezie Apps	11	SR	11	Georgia Cussons
Sariah Paki	12	SR	12	Paige Travis
Olivia Kernick	13	LK/LF	13	Bethan Dainton
Keeley Nizza	14	IN	14	Kathryn Salter
Keilee Joseph	15	IN	15	Erin Williams
Sarah Togatuki	16	IN	16	Gracie Hobbs
Sheridan Gallagher	17	IN	17	Lucia Davies
Olivia Higgins	18	RES	18	Danielle Mcgifford
Jess Skinner		Coach		Thomas Brindle

==== Group B ====
17 October 2026
12:15 PNGST (UTC+10:00)

Papua New Guinea	58–4	France
Tries: Wuriki-Hosea 6'; Long 18', 64'; Ginn 20', 47'; Molo 24', 50'; Kelly 28', 44', 52', 62'; Wong 32'; Goals: Butler (0/2); Veiver (5/10)	1st: 32–0; 2nd: 26–4; Report	Tries: Samarra 37'

PNG Football Stadium, Port Moresby
Attendance: 6,868
Referee: Liam Moore (England)
Video referee: Todd Smith (Australia)
Touch judges: Geoffrey Poumes (France), Dillan Wells (Australia)
Player of the Match: Tia Molo (PNG)

Team details
Papua New Guinea		Position	France
Name	Number	Position	Number	Name
Anika Butler	1	FB	1	Manon Samarra
Ivania Wong	2	WG	2	Perle Ramazeilles
Relna Wuriki-Hosea	3	CE	3	Melisa Medina
Tia Molo	4	CE	4	Amaël Vilanove
Naomi Kelly	5	WG	5	Haoua Kessely
Fleur Ginn	6	FE/SO	6	Camille Boudad
Cynthia Peters	7	HB/SH	7	Lisa Diraison
Elsie Albert	8	PR	8	Elisa Akpa
Ua Ravu	9	HK	9	Cristina Song Puche
Jafinda Sap	10	PF	10	Elodie Pacull
Belinda Gwasamun	11	SR	11	Perrine Monsarrat
Shellie Long	12	SR	12	Stecy Bessier
Emily Veivers	13	LK/LF	13	Leila Bessahli
Therese Aiton	14	IN	14	Fanny Ramos
Essay Banu	15	IN	15	Salome Segala
Jenny David	16	IN	16	Louisa Tooman
India Seeto	17	IN	17	Justine Roses
Gemma Schnaubelt	18	RES	18	Margot Canal
Craig Sandercock		Coach		Alan Walsh

18 October 2026
13:50 AEDT (UTC+11:00)

New Zealand	18–12	Fiji
Tries: Waaka 2', 31'; Tufuga 67'; Goals: Temara (3/3)	1st: 10–12; 2nd: 8–0; Report	Tries: Lutu 21'; Laing 27'; Goals: Yaranuma (1/1); Naitokatoka (1/1)

Newcastle International Sports Centre, Newcastle
Attendance: 10,604
Referee: Belinda Sharpe (Australia)
Video referee: Peter Gough (Australia)
Touch judges: Paki Parkinson (New Zealand), Jack Feavers (New Zealand)
Player of the Match: Stacey Waaka (New Zealand)

Team details
New Zealand		Position	Fiji
Name	Number	Position	Number	Name
Apii Nicholls	1	FB	1	Cassandra Staples
Leianne Tufuga	2	WG	2	Maria Paseka
Mele Hufanga	3	CE	3	Isabella Waterman
Abigail Roache	4	CE	4	Taina Naividi
Stacey Waaka	5	WG	5	Sienna Rose Laing
Zahara Temara	6	FE	6	Luisa Yaranamu
Raecene Mcgregor	7	HB	7	Losana Lutu
Otesa Pule	8	PR	8	Latisha Smythe Uluibanu
Georgia Hale	9	HK	9	Sere Naitokatoka
Shannon Lorraine Mato	10	PF	10	Leilani Asham
Nessa Biddle	11	SR	11	Grace Naleba
Kaiyah Atai	12	SR	12	Tamika Jones
Angelina Teakaraanga Katoa	13	LK	13	Talei Holmes
Ashleigh Quinlan	14	IN	14	Tahlia Marshall
Alexis Tauaneai	15	IN	15	Teaghan Laing-Hartigan
Ivana Lauititi	16	IN	16	Lorren Leli
Brianna Clark	17	IN	17	Nanise Vakacavu
Brooke Anderson	18	RES	18	Naomi Sivoi Tegu
Ricky Henry		Coach		Jone Wesele

24 October 2026
12:15 PNGST (UTC+10:00)

Papua New Guinea	4–40	Fiji
Tries: Ravu 8'; Goals: Butler (0/1)	1st: 4–30; 2nd: 0–10; Report	Tries: Laing 4'; Yaranamu 19'; Naividi 24'; Lutu 30'; Marshall 33', 40', 44'; Goals: Naitokatoka (6/7)

PNG Football Stadium, Port Moresby
Attendance: 7,475
Referee: Kasey Badger (Australia)
Video referee: Todd Smith (Australia)
Touch judges: Tori Wilkie (Australia), Izzy Davidson (Australia)
Player of the Match: Taina Naividi (Fiji)

Team details
Papua New Guinea		Position	Fiji
Name	Number	Position	Number	Name
Anika Butler	1	FB	1	Cassandra Staples
Ivania Wong	2	WG	2	Sienna Rose Laing
Relna Wuriki-Hosea	3	CE	3	Isabella Waterman
Tia Molo	4	CE	4	Taina Naividi
Naomi Kelly	5	WG	5	Tahlia Marshall
Fleur Ginn	6	FE	6	Luisa Yaranamu
Cynthia Peters	7	HB	7	Losana Lutu
Elsie Albert	8	PR	8	Latisha Smythe Uluibanu
Ua Ravu	9	HK	9	Sere Naitokatoka
Jenny David	10	PF	10	Leilani Asham
Belinda Gwasamun	11	SR	11	Grace Naleba
Shellie Long	12	SR	12	Nanise Vakacavu
Emily Veivers	13	LK	13	Talei Holmes
Venesa Nakas	14	IN	14	Tahlia Marshall
Essay Banu	15	IN	15	Teaghan Laing-Hartigan
India Seeto	16	IN	16	Lorren Ieli
Therese Aiton	17	IN	17	Naomi Sivoi Tegu
Gemma Schnaubelt	18	RES	18	Ema Masi
Craig Sandercock		Coach		Jone Wesele

25 October 2026
15:50 NZDT (UTC+13:00)

New Zealand	92–0	France
Tries: Wiki 1', 57'; Nicholls 4', 10', 61', 69'; Kiria-Ratu 7'; Mcgregor 19', 40'; Waaka 22', 28', 52'; Hufanga 25', 32', 35'; Atai 42'; Willison 46', 48' Goals: Kiria-Ratu (9/17); Nicholls (1/1)	1st: 46–0; 2nd: 46–0; Report

Te Kaha Stadium, Christchurch
Referee: Tara Jones (England)
Video referee: Peter Gough (Australia)
Touch judges: Jack Feavers (New Zealand), Paki Parkinson (New Zealand)
Player of the Match: Mele Hufanga (New Zealand)

Team details
New Zealand		Position	France
Name	Number	Position	Number	Name
Apii Nicholls	1	FB	1	Manon Samarra
Tenika Willison	2	WG	2	Margot Canal
Mele Hufanga	3	CE	3	Melisa Medina
Stacey Waaka	4	CE	4	Perle Ramazeilles
Mackenzie Wiki	5	WG	5	Haoua Kessely
Chanty Kiria-Ratu	6	FE/SO	6	Camille Boudad
Raecene Mcgregor	7	HB/SH	7	Lisa Diraison
Alexis Tauaneai	8	PR	8	Elisa Akpa
Georgia Hale	9	HK	9	Fanny Ramos
Ivana Lauititi	10	PF	10	Leila Bessahli
Nessa Biddle	11	SR	11	Perrine Monsarrat
Kaiyah Atai	12	SR	12	Stecy Bessier
Brooke Anderson	13	LK/LF	13	Tallis Eranossian
Ashleigh Quinlan	14	IN	14	Justine Roses
Shaniece Monschau	15	IN	15	Noemie Samuel
Trinity Tauaneai	16	IN	16	Salome Segala
Angelina Teakaraanga Katoa	17	IN	17	Elodie Pacull
Abigail Roache	18	RES	18	Cristina Song Puche
Ricky Henry		Coach		Alan Walsh

31 October 2026
12:35 AEST (UTC+10:00)

Fiji
Tries: Marshall 3', 45'
Paseka 19'
Namoce 24'
Lutu 27'
Staples 39'

Uluibanu 51'
Asham 54'
Naividi 63'
Ieli 67'
Goals: Yaranamu (7/10)

54–6
1st: 20–0
2nd: 34–6
Report

France
Tries: Bessier 38'
Goals: Diralison (1/1)

Robina Stadium, Gold Coast
Attendance: 10,966
Referee: Tara Jones (England)
Video referee: Kasey Badger (Australia)
Touch judges: Izzy Davidson (Australia), Geoffrey Poumes (France)
Player of the Match: Latisha Smythe (Fiji)

Team details
Fiji		Position	France
Name	Number	Position	Number	Name
Cassandra Staples	1	FB	1	Manon Samarra
Maria Paseka	2	WG	2	Margot Canal
Isabella Waterman	3	CE	3	Melisa Medina
Taina Naividi	4	CE	4	Perle Ramazeilles
Tahlia Marshall	5	WG	5	Haoua Kessely
Luisa Yaranamu	6	FE/SO	6	Camille Boudad
Losana Lutu	7	HB/SH	7	Lisa Diraison
Latisha Smythe Uluibanu	8	PR	8	Elisa Akpa
Sere Naitokatoka	9	HK	9	Cristina Song Puche
Lorren Ieli	10	PF	10	Elodie Pacull
Grace Naleba	11	SR	11	Perrine Monsarrat
Talei Holmes	12	SR	12	Stecy Bessier
Leilani Asham	13	LK/LF	13	Leila Bessahli
Ema Masi	14	IN	14	Fanny Ramos
Aliti Namoce	15	IN	15	Salome Segala
Naomi Sivoi Tegu	16	IN	16	Louisa Tooman
Rory Muller	17	IN	17	Justine Roses
Ebony Laing	18	RES	18	Tessa Benmalek
Jone Wesele		Coach		Alan Walsh

31 October 2026
16:55 AEST (UTC+10:00)

New Zealand	40–12	Papua New Guinea
Tries: Waaka 5'; Wiki 18,45'; Atai 33'; Pule 35'; Tufuga 52'; Roache 54,62'; Goals: Temara (4/8)	1st: 14–12; 2nd: 26–0; Report	Tries: Molo 8'; Albert 21'; Goals: Veivers (2/2)

Robina Stadium, Gold Coast
Referee: Belinda Sharpe (Australia)
Video referee: Gerard Sutton (Australia)
Touch judges: Tori Wilkie (Australia), Rochelle Tamarua (New Zealand)
Player of the Match: Apii Nicholls (New Zealand)

Team details
New Zealand		Position	Papua New Guinea
Name	Number	Position	Number	Name
Apii Nicholls	1	FB	1	Anika Butler
Leianne Tufuga	2	WG	2	Mala Mark
Abigail Roache	3	CE	3	Relna Wuriki-Hosea
Stacey Waaka	4	CE	4	Tia Molo
Mackenzie Wiki	5	WG	5	Naomi Kelly
Zahara Temara	6	FE	6	Fleur Ginn
Raecene Mcgregor	7	HB	7	Gemma Schnaubelt
Alexis Tauaneai	8	PR	8	Elsie Albert
Georgia Hale	9	HK	9	Therese Aiton
Shannon Lorraine Mato	10	PF	10	Jenny David
Shaniece Monschau	11	SR	11	Emily Veivers
Kaiyah Atai	12	SR	12	Shellie Long
Angelina Teakaraanga Katoa	13	LK	13	India Seeto
Ashleigh Quinlan	14	IN	14	Essay Banu
Otesa Pule	15	IN	15	Venesa Nakas
Brooke Anderson	16	IN	16	Mya Muller
Ivana Lauititi	17	IN	17	Jafinda Sap
Tenika Willison	18	RES	18	Ua Ravu
Ricky Henry		Coach		Craig Sandercock

==== Semi Finals ====
7 November 2026
17:55 AEDT (UTC+11:00)

New Zealand	32–0	Samoa
Tries: Wiki 1'; Waaka 24', 43', 63'; Hufanga 57'; Atai 59'; McGregor 66'; Goals: Kiria-Ratu (2/7)	1st: 8–0; 2nd: 24–0; Report

Newcastle International Sports Centre, Newcastle
Attendance: 29,712
Referee: Tara Jones (England)
Video referee: Todd Smith (Australia)
Touch judges: Tori Wilkie (Australia), Karra-Lee Nolan (Australia)
Player of the Match: Stacey Waaka (New Zealand)

Team details
New Zealand		Position	Samoa
Name	Number	Position	Number	Name
Apii Nicholls	1	FB	1	Destiny Sinapati
Leianne Tufuga	2	WG	2	Mercedez Taulelei-Saila
Mele Hufanga	3	CE	3	Monica Tagoai
Stacey Waaka	4	CE	4	Tyra Le Ekepati
Mackenzie Wiki	5	WG	5	Ana Leatupue
Chanty Kiria-Ratu	6	FE	6	Evania Isa'Ako
Raecene Mcgregor	7	HB	7	Pauline Piliae
Alexis Tauaneai	8	PR	8	Annetta Nuuausala
Georgia Hale	9	HK	9	Mary Jane Taito
Otesa Pule	10	PF	10	Laikha Clarke
Shaniece Monschau	11	SR	11	Leilani Wilson
Kaiyah Atai	12	SR	12	Ivana Lolesio
Angelina Teakaraanga Katoa	13	LK	13	Fanua Rimoni
Ashleigh Quinlan	14	IN	14	Tavarna Papalii
Nessa Biddle	15	IN	15	Christabelle Onesome-Tuilaepa
Shannon Lorraine Mato	16	IN	16	Jasmine Fogavini
Ivana Lauititi	17	IN	17	Christian Pio
Brooke Anderson	18	RES	18	Jaydika Tafua
Ricky Henry		Coach		Frank Pritchard

8 November 2026
17:55 AEDT (UTC+11:00)

Australia	30–14	Fiji
Tries: Church 24', 39', 50', 66'; Upton 28'; Chapman 43'; Goals: Kelleher (3/6)	1st: 8–8; 2nd: 22–6; Report	Tries: Yaranamu 15'; Paseka 61'; Goals: Yaranamu (3/3)

Sydney Football Stadium, Sydney
Attendance: 41,529
Referee: Belinda Sharpe (Australia)
Video referee: Liam Kennedy (Australia)
Touch judges: Dillan Wells (Australia), Izzy Davidson (Australia)
Player of the Match: Abbi Church (Australia)

Team details
Australia		Position	Fiji
Name	Number	Position	Number	Name
Tamika Upton	1	FB	1	Cassandra Staples
Jaime Chapman	2	WG	2	Maria Paseka
Jessica Sergis	3	CE	3	Isabella Waterman
Isabelle Kelly	4	CE	4	Sienna Rose Laing
Abbi Church	5	WG	5	Taina Naividi
Jocelyn Kelleher	6	FE	6	Luisa Yaranamu
Tarryn Aiken	7	HB	7	Losana Lutu
Millie Elliott	8	PR	8	Latisha Smythe Uluibanu
Olivia Higgins	9	HK	9	Sere Naitokatoka
Simaima Taufa	10	PF	10	Lorren Ieli
Tiana Penitani	11	SR	11	Grace Naleba
Shaylee Bent	12	SR	12	Talei Holmes
Olivia Kernick	13	LK	13	Leilani Asham
Keeley Nizza	14	IN	14	Tahlia Marshall
Keilee Joseph	15	IN	15	Teaghan Laing-Hartigan
Kezie Apps	16	IN	16	Ema Masi
Sariah Paki	17	IN	17	Aliti Namoce
Sheridan Gallagher	18	RES	18	Nanise Vakacavu
Jess Skinner		Coach		Jone Wesele

==== Final ====
15 November 2026
15:15 AEST (UTC+10:00)

Australia	34–10	New Zealand
Tries: Chapman 2', 14', 28'; Bent 5'; Sergis 18'; Upton 32'; Goals: Southwell (5/6)	1st: 34–6; 2nd: 0–4; Source	Tries: Mato 23'; Wiki 69'; Goals: Kiria-Ratu (1/2)

Lang Park, Brisbane
Attendance: 28,119
Referee: Belinda Sharpe (Australia)
Video referee: Todd Smith (Australia)
Touch judges: Karra-Lee Nolan (Australia), Tara Jones (England)
Player of the Match: Jaime Chapman (Australia)

=== Wheelchair World Cup ===
==== Group A ====
30 October 2026
13:00 AEDT (UTC+11:00)

Ireland	110–10	United States
Tries: Calcott 5', 13', 25', 30', 37', 41', 45'; Horgan 9', 11', 17', 32', 34', 59'; Martin 65', 70', 75'; Burton-Carter 20', 22'; Johnston 79'; Goals: Horgan (1/1); Johnston (10/11); Roberts (5/6)	1st: 66–6; 2nd: 46–4; Report	Tries: Gray 2'; Lind 63'; Goals: Johnstone (1/2)

WIN Entertainment Centre, Wollongong
Attendance: 1,008
Referees: Ollie Cruickshank (Scotland), Stephane Vincent (France)
Player of the Match: Joseph Calcott (Ireland)

Team details
Ireland		Position	USA
Name	Number	Position	Number	Name
Cian Horgan	1	Starter	1	Jabrier Lee
Toby Burton-Carter	2	Starter	2	William Johnstone
Melanie Griffith	3	Starter	3	Mack Johnson
Peter Johnston	4	Starter	4	Andy Kingsley
Joseph Calcott	5	Starter	5	Jesse Lind
Tom Martin	6	Interchange	6	Freddie Smith III
Phil Roberts	7	Interchange	7	Cole Wooten
James Mccarthy	8	Interchange	8	Brent Hawkins
Jack Mangan	9	Reserve	9	Antoine Gray
Phil Roberts		Coach		Geoff Mason

30 October 2026
15:30 AEDT (UTC+11:00)

England	98–18	Wales
Tries: Collins 1', 25', 51', 79'; Hawkins 11', 14', 28', 32', 37', 41', 46', 54', 57', 62', 73'; Coyd 22'; Billington 60'; Brown 75'; Goals: Collins (9/12); Hawkins (4/6)	1st: 46–12; 2nd: 52–6; Report	Tries: Turner 10'; Ramsey 18', 70'; Goals: Turner (3/3)

WIN Entertainment Centre, Wollongong
Attendance: 1,008
Referees: Tim Robinson (Australia), Karli Wilkinson (England)
Player of the Match: Rob Hawkins (England)

Team details
England		Position	Wales
Name	Number	Position	Number	Name
Nathan Collins	1	Starter	1	Sid Ramsey
Rob Hawkins	2	Starter	2	Mark Williams
Joe Coyd	3	Starter	3	Jodie Boyd-Ward
Jack Brown	4	Starter	4	Stuart Williams
Lewis King	5	Starter	5	Matthew Turner
Fin O'Neil	6	Interchange	6	Fionn Mccabe
Mason Billington	7	Interchange	7	Jonathan Gill
Tristan Norfolk	8	Interchange	8	John Berriman
Luis Domingos	9	Reserve	9	Lee Sargent
Tom Coyd		Coach		Alan Caron

3 November 2026
16:00 AEDT (UTC+11:00)

Ireland	68–28	Wales
Tries: Horgan 3', 61', 64', 71'; Calcott 10', 28', 48', 51', 66', 76'; Martin 22'; Mangan 73'; Goals: Roberts (10/12)	1st: 20–12; 2nd: 48–16; Report	Tries: S Ramsey 6'; M Willams 33'; Higgins 41'; S Williams 45'; Turner 54'; Goals: Turner (4/5)

WIN Entertainment Centre, Wollongong
Referees: Jake Brook (England), Maxine Godinet (New Zealand)
Touch judges: Laurent Bonnet (France), Karli Wilkinson (England)
Player of the Match: Joseph Calcott (Ireland)

Team details
Ireland		Position	Wales
Name	Number	Position	Number	Name
Cian Horgan	1	Starter	1	Sid Ramsey
Melanie Griffith	2	Starter	2	Lee Sargent
Thomas Martin	3	Starter	3	Stuart Williams
Phil Roberts	4	Starter	4	Matthew Turner
Joseph Calcott	5	Starter	5	Jodie Boyd-Ward
Oran Spain	6	Interchange	6	Andrew Higgins
Jack Mangan	7	Interchange	7	Jonathan Gill
Maurice Noonan	8	Interchange	8	Mark Williams
Toby Burton-Carter	9	Reserve	9	Gareth Ramsey
Phil Roberts		Coach		Alan Caron

3 November 2026
18:30 AEDT (UTC+11:00)

England	134–0	United States
Tries: Norfolk 1', 9', 18'; Domingos 3', 22', 67', 76'; Haynes 13', 16', 57', 74'; Billington 30', 39', 48', 53'; O'Neil 32', 41'; Brown 51', 71', 78'; King 60'; Coyd 63', 69'; Goals: O'Neil (15/16); Coyd (6/7)	1st: 58–0; 2nd: 76–0; Report

WIN Entertainment Centre, Wollongong
Referees: Ollie Cruickshank (Scotland), Steve Hewson (Australia)
Touch judges: Robert Burgin, Luke Anderson
Player of the Match: Finlay O'Neill (England)

Team details
England		Position	USA
Name	Number	Position	Number	Name
Fin O'Neil	1	Starter	1	Antoine Gray
Luis Domingos	2	Starter	2	Jesse Lind
Tristan Norfolk	3	Starter	3	Jabrier Lee
Chris Haynes	4	Starter	4	Brent Hawkins
Mason Billington	5	Starter	5	Andy Kingsley
Joe Coyd	6	Interchange	6	Freddie Smith III
Lewis King	7	Interchange	7	Cole Wooten
Jack Brown	8	Interchange	8	Morrell Fox
Nathan Collins	9	Reserve	9	William Johnstone
Tom Coyd		Coach		Geoff Mason

6 November 2026
13:30 AEDT (UTC+11:00)

Wales	92–18	United States
Tries: Berriman 2', 15', 18', 55'; Higgins 5', 31'; McCabe 9', 29', 71'; Williams 22', 47'; Gill 26', 62', 77'; Turner 29'; Ramsey 38', 42'; Goals: Higgins (10/10); Turner (2/2)	1st: 54–0; 2nd: 38–18; Report	Tries: Johnson 40', 53'; Gray 50'; Goals: Johnstone (3/3)

WIN Entertainment Centre, Wollongong
Attendance: 1,192
Referees: Karli Wilkinson (England), Luke Anderson (Australia)
Touch judges: Maxine Godinet (New Zealand), Steve Hewson (Australia)
Player of the Match: Andrew Higgins (Wales)

Team details
Wales		Position	USA
Name	Number	Position	Number	Name
Fionn McCabe	1	Starter	1	Andy Kingsley
Andrew Higgins	2	Starter	2	Mack Johnson
Jonathan Gill	3	Starter	3	Jabrier Lee
Stuart Williams	4	Starter	4	Brent Hawkins
John Berriman	5	Starter	5	Antoine Gray
Lee Sargent	6	Interchange	6	Freddie Smith III
Gareth Ramsey	7	Interchange	7	Jesse Lind
Matthew Turner	8	Interchange	8	Morrell Fox
Martin Turner	9	Reserve	9	William Johnstone
Alan Caron		Coach		Geoff Mason

6 November 2026
17:00 AEDT (UTC+11:00)

England	68–32	Ireland
Tries: King 19', 30'; Coyd 28', 45', 52', 62'; Hawkins 34', 43', 48'; Billington 60', 68'; Brown 74'; Goals: O'Neil (1/1); Collins (9/9)	1st: 22–20; 2nd: 46–12; Report	Tries: Johnston 4'; Burton-Carter 16'; Spain 22'; Calcott 72'; Mangan 78'; Goals: Spain (1/1); Johnston (4/4)

WIN Entertainment Centre, Wollongong
Attendance: 1,192
Referees: Stephane Vincent (France), Laurent Bonnet (France)
Touch judges: Anthony Bishop (Australia), Jake Brook (England)
Player of the Match: Joe Coyd (England)

Team details
England		Position	Ireland
Name	Number	Position	Number	Name
Fin O'Neil	1	Starter	1	Joseph Calcott
Rob Hawkins	2	Starter	2	Oran Spain
Tristan Norfolk	3	Starter	3	Melanie Griffith
Jack Brown	4	Starter	4	Jack Mangan
Lewis King	5	Starter	5	Peter Johnston
Nathan Collins	6	Interchange	6	Toby Burton-Carter
Mason Billington	7	Interchange	7	Thomas Martin
Joe Coyd	8	Interchange	8	James McCarthy
Chris Haynes	9	Reserve	9	Maurice Noonan
Tom Coyd		Coach		Phil Roberts

==== Group B ====
31 October 2026
15:00 AEDT (UTC+11:00)

France	114–0	Scotland
Tries: Bourson 4', 16', 36', 43', 48', 52', 67'; Zittel 9', 46', 57', 61'; Clausells 13', 20'; J. Hivernat 28', 30', 32', 38', 78'; L. Hivernat 38'; Guttadoro 69'; Goals: Clausells (2/2); Bourson (2/2); L. Hivernat (6/6); J. Hivernat (7/7)	1st: 62–0; 2nd: 52–0; Report

WIN Entertainment Centre, Wollongong
Attendance: 1,216
Referees: Rebecca Whiteley (England), Robert Burgin (Australia)
Touch judges: Maxine Godinet (France), Anthony Bishop (Australia)
Player of the Match: Jérémy Bourson (France)

Team details
France		Position	Scotland
Name	Number	Position	Number	Name
Gilles Clausells	1	Starter	1	Oliva Fulton
Guillaume Dubruel	2	Starter	2	Calum Davidson
Jérémy Bourson	3	Starter	3	Aaron King
Adrien Zittel	4	Starter	4	Alex Howe
Leo Hivernat	5	Starter	5	David Hill
Florian Guttadoro	6	Interchange	6	Hamish Douglas
Jonathan Hivernat	7	Interchange	7	Calum Japes
Jorge Gelade Panzo	8	Interchange	8	Mark Robertson
Dany Denuwaelere	9	Reserve	9	John Clarke
Cyril Torres		Coach		Martyn Gill

31 October 2026
17:30 AEDT (UTC+11:00)

Australia	112–14	New Zealand
Tries: Karim 1', 15', 52'; Anstey 5', 17', 75'; Mckenna 11', 21', 60', 73'; Tannock 19', 41', 56'; Cannane 33'; Schumacher 64', 69'; Luff 71', 78'; Goals: McKenna (15/18)	1st: 48–10; 2nd: 64–4; Report	Tries: Fa'atau 26', 48'; Sulusi 35'; Goals: Hirini-Barclay (1/3)

WIN Entertainment Centre, Wollongong
Attendance: 1,216
Referees: Laurent Bonnet (France), Jake Brook (England)
Touch judges: Luke Anderson (Australia), Steve Hewson (Australia)
Player of the Match: Bayley McKenna (Australia)

Team details
Australia		Position	New Zealand
Name	Number	Position	Number	Name
Daniel Anstey	1	Starter	1	Jayson Hooker
Cory Cannane	2	Starter	2	Nikia Fa'atau
Diab Karim	3	Starter	3	Ryan Charles
Bayley McKenna	4	Starter	4	Pele Sulusi
Zac Schumacher	5	Starter	5	Mitch Stone
Peter Arbuckle	6	Interchange	6	Jack Brown
Liam Luff	7	Interchange	7	Joshua Hirini-Barclay
Adam Tannock	8	Interchange	8	Kauri Murray
Toby Popple	9	Reserve	9	Jamie Tapp
Brett Clark		Coach		Edie George

3 November 2026
11:00 AEDT (UTC+11:00)

France	120–10	New Zealand
Tries: Gelade Panzo 1', 67', 73', 79'; Bourson 3', 6', 23', 39', 70', 76'; Denuwaelere 9', 19', 31', 33', 59'; N Clausells 27', 35', 38', 57'; Dore 49'; Zittel 55' Goals: Guttadoro (8/8); N Clausells (8/8)	1st: 74–0; 2nd: 56–10; Report	Tries: Murray 45'; Fa'atau 62'; Goals: Charles (1/2)

WIN Entertainment Centre, Wollongong
Referees: Tim Robinson (Australia), Anthony Bishop (Australia)
Touch judges: Laurent Bonnet (France), Karli Wilkinson (England)
Player of the Match: Jérémy Bourson (France)

Team details
France		Position	New Zealand
Name	Number	Position	Number	Name
Gilles Clausells	1	Starter	1	Ryan Charles
Damien Dore	2	Starter	2	Nikia Fa'Atau
Florian Guttadoro	3	Starter	3	Jayson Hooker
Jérémy Bourson	4	Starter	4	Pele Sulusi
Adrien Zittel	5	Starter	5	Kauri Murray
Nicolas Clausells	6	Interchange	6	Joshua Hirini-Barclay
Dany Denuwaelere	7	Interchange	7	Dan Scott
Jorge Gelade Panzo	8	Interchange	8	Jack Brown
Guillaume Dubruel	9	Reserve	9	Mitch Stone
Cyril Torres		Coach		Edie George

3 November 2026
13:30 AEDT (UTC+11:00)

Australia	104–24	Scotland
Tries: Schumacher 6', 13', 66', 72'; Tannock 9', 15', 31', 45', 51', 61'; Anstey 11', 43'; Karim 21', 64', 68'; McKenna 33', 40', 57'; Cannane 79'; Goals: Cannane (1/1); Karim (3/3); McKenna (10/10)	1st: 44–12; 2nd: 60–12; Report	Tries: Simpson-Hill 19'; Davidson 27'; Douglas 70'; Owen 77'; Goals: Douglas (1/1); Davidson (3/3)

WIN Entertainment Centre, Wollongong
Referees: Stephane Vincent (France), Rebecca Whiteley (England)
Touch judges: Robert Burgin (Australia), Luke Anderson (Australia)
Player of the Match: Adam Tannock (Australia)

Team details
Australia		Position	Scotland
Name	Number	Position	Number	Name
Peter Arbuckle	1	Starter	1	John Clarke
Daniel Anstey	2	Starter	2	David Hill
Liam Luff	3	Starter	3	Aaron King
Cory Cannane	4	Starter	4	Max Owen
Diab Karim	5	Starter	5	Sarah Devlin
Bayley Mckenna	6	Interchange	6	Oliva Fulton
Zac Schumacher	7	Interchange	7	Hamish Douglas
Adam Tannock	8	Interchange	8	James Simpson-Hill
Toby Popple	9	Reserve	9	Alex Howe
Brett Clark		Coach		Martyn Gill

6 November 2026
11:00 AEDT (UTC+11:00)

Scotland	62–18	New Zealand
Tries: Douglas 1'; Davidson 7', 39', 45', 60'; Hill 24'; Simpson-Hill 27', 79'; Owen 34', 55', 72'; Goals: Davidson (7/16); Douglas (2/2)	1st: 32–12; 2nd: 30–6; Report	Tries: Fa'atau 10'; Hirini-Barclay 18'; Brown 66'; Goals: Hirini-Barclay (3/3)

WIN Entertainment Centre, Wollongong
Attendance: 1,192
Referees: Jake Brook (England), Tim Robinson (Australia)
Touch judges: Anthony Bishop (Australia), Robert Burgin (Australia)
Player of the Match: Calum Davidson (Scotland)

Team details
Scotland		Position	New Zealand
Name	Number	Position	Number	Name
Calum Davidson	1	Starter	1	Jayson Hooker
James Simpson-Hill	2	Starter	2	Nikia Fa'Atau
David Hill	3	Starter	3	Joshua Hirini-Barclay
Oliva Fulton	4	Starter	4	Kauri Murray
Hamish Douglas	5	Starter	5	Pele Sulusi
Aaron King	6	Interchange	6	Jack Brown
Max Owen	7	Interchange	7	Ryan Charles
Sarah Devlin	8	Interchange	8	Mitch Stone
Calum Japes	9	Reserve	9	Jamie Tapp
Martyn Gill		Coach		Edie George

6 November 2026
19:30 AEDT (UTC+11:00)

France	69–34	Australia
Tries: Dore 2'; Denuwaelere 11', 13', 34'; Gelade Panzo 29'; N Clausells 40', 79'; Bourson 48'; G Clausells 51', 66'; Guttadoro 56'; Hivernat 63'; Goals: Guttadoro (3/4); Hivernat (1/1); N Clausells (6/6); Drop goals: G Clausells (1/1)	1st: 30–22; 2nd: 39–12; Report	Tries: Anstey 15'; Tannock 19',78'; McKenna 23'; Karim 38'; Schumaker 44'; Goals: McKenna (4/4); Karim (1/1)

WIN Entertainment Centre, Wollongong
Attendance: 1,192
Referees: Rebecca Whiteley (England), Ollie Cruickshank (Scotland)
Touch judges: Maxine Godinet (France), Robert Burgin (Australia)
Player of the Match: Gilles Clausells (France)

Team details
France		Position	Australia
Name	Number	Position	Number	Name
Damien Dore	1	Starter	1	Cory Cannane
Florian Guttadoro	2	Starter	2	Bayley Mckenna
Jérémy Bourson	3	Starter	3	Zac Schumacher
Dany Denuwaelere	4	Starter	4	Adam Tannock
Jorge Gelade Panzo	5	Starter	5	Daniel Anstey
Gilles Clausells	6	Interchange	6	Peter Arbuckle
Jonathan Hivernat	7	Interchange	7	Liam Luff
Nicolas Clausells	8	Interchange	8	Diab Karim
Adrien Zittel	9	Reserve	9	Toby Popple
Cyril Torres		Coach		Brett Clark

==== Ranking Semi Finals ====
9 November 2026
11:00 AEDT (UTC+11:00)

Wales	64–36	New Zealand
Tries: S Williams 1', 17', 52', 56', 75'; Higgins 9', 65'; Turner 23'; Boyd-Ward 68', 70'; M Williams 73'; Goals: Higgins(9/10); Turner (1/1)	1st: 24–24; 2nd: 40–12; Report	Tries: Fa'atau 5'; Charles 19'; Murray 26'; Hirini-Barclay 37',62'; Tapp 47'; Goals: Charles (4/4); Hirini-Barclay (2/2)

WIN Entertainment Centre, Wollongong
Attendance: 700
Referees: Maxine Godinet, Laurent Bonnet
Touch judges: Anthony Bishop, Tim Robinson (Australia)
Player of the Match: Stuart Williams (Wales)

Team details
Wales		Position	New Zealand
Name	Number	Position	Number	Name
Fionn McCabe	1	Starter	1	Ryan Charles
Andrew Higgins	2	Starter	2	Jayson Hooker
Jodie Boyd-Ward	3	Starter	3	Dan Scott
Stuart Williams	4	Starter	4	Kauri Murray
Mark Williams	5	Starter	5	Nikia Fa'Atau
Sid Ramsey	6	Interchange	6	Jack Brown
Jonathan Gill	7	Interchange	7	Joshua Hirini-Barclay
Matthew Turner	8	Interchange	8	Jamie Tapp
Martin Turner	9	Reserve	9	Pele Sulusi
Alan Caron		Coach		Edie George

9 November 2026
13:30 AEDT (UTC+11:00)

Scotland	44–12	United States
Tries: King 6', 9'; Davidson 18'; Devlin 27'; Howe 36', 71'; Calum Japes 56', 77'; Goals: Davidson (4/5); Robertson (2/3)	1st: 28–6; 2nd: 16–6; Report	Tries: Johnson 3'; Gray 74'; Goals: Hawkins (2/2)

WIN Entertainment Centre, Wollongong
Attendance: 700
Referees: Robert Burgin, Karli Wilkinson (England)
Touch judges: Steve Hewson (Australia), Ollie Cruickshank (Scotland)
Player of the Match: Arran King (Scotland)

Team details
Scotland		Position	USA
Name	Number	Position	Number	Name
Calum Davidson	1	Starter	1	Mack Johnson
Aaron King	2	Starter	2	Jesse Lind
Max Owen	3	Starter	3	Jabrier Lee
Sarah Devlin	4	Starter	4	Brent Hawkins
John Clarke	5	Starter	5	Antoine Gray
Oliva Fulton	6	Interchange	6	Freddie Smith III
Calum Japes	7	Interchange	7	Cole Wooten
Mark Robertson	8	Interchange	8	William Johnstone
Alex Howe	9	Reserve	9	Andy Kingsley
Martyn Gill		Coach		Geoff mason

==== Semi Finals ====
10 November 2026
17:15 AEDT (UTC+11:00)

France	82–26	Ireland
Tries: L Hivernat 5'; J Hivernat 14'; Dore 18', 43', 46', 52', 59'; N Clausells 20'; Denuwaelere 32', 39', 42', 51', 60', 66'; G Clausells 57'; Goals: L Hivernat (3/5); N Clausells (8/10)	1st: 32–14; 2nd: 50–12; Report	Tries: Johnston 11'; Horgan 21', 62'; Mangan 36'; Calcott 69'; Goals: Horgan (0/1); Johnston (0/1); Spain (3/3)

WIN Entertainment Centre, Wollongong
Referees: Rebecca Whiteley (England), Stephane Vincent (France)
Touch judges: Jake Brook (England), Luke Anderson (Australia)
Player of the Match: Dany Denuwelaere (France)

Team details
France		Position	Ireland
Name	Number	Position	Number	Name
Gilles Clausells	1	Starter	1	Joseph Calcott
Damien Dore	2	Starter	2	Melanie Griffith
Leo Hivernat	3	Starter	3	Cian Horgan
Nicolas Clausells	4	Starter	4	Peter Johnson
Jonathan Hivernat	5	Starter	5	Jack Mangan
Adrien Zittel	6	Interchange	6	Oran Spain
Dany Denuwaelere	7	Interchange	7	Toby Burton-Carter
Guillaume Dubruel	8	Interchange	8	Thomas Martin
Jorge Gelade Panzo	9	Reserve	9	Phil Roberts
Cyril Torres		Coach		Phil Roberts

10 November 2026
19:45 AEDT (UTC+11:00)

England	86–18	Australia
Tries: Billington 3', 33', 35'; Hawkins 9', 13', 53', 57', 63'; Joe Coyd 17', 23'; Brown 41', 46'; Collins 49'; Haynes 70'; King 74'; Goals: Hawkins (5/5); Collins (8/10)	1st: 40–6; 2nd: 46–12; Report	Tries: Karim 28', 60'; Anstey 66'; Goals: McKenna (3/3)

WIN Entertainment Centre, Wollongong
Referees: Tim Robinson (Australia), Ollie Cruickshank (Scotland)
Touch judges: Maxine Godinet (France), Robert Burgin (Australia)
Player of the Match: Mason Billington (England)

Team details
England		Position	Australia
Name	Number	Position	Number	Name
Joe Coyd	1	Starter	1	Adam Tannock
Rob Hawkins	2	Starter	2	Bayley Mckenna
Tristan Norfolk	3	Starter	3	Daniel Anstey
Lewis King	4	Starter	4	Cory Cannane
Mason Billington	5	Starter	5	Zac Schumacher
Nathan Collins	6	Interchange	6	Peter Arbuckle
Chris Haynes	7	Interchange	7	Liam Luff
Jack Brown	8	Interchange	8	Diab Karim
Fin O'Neil	9	Reserve	9	Toby Popple
Tom Coyd		Coach		Brett Clark

==== 7th-place play-offs ====
12 November 2026
11:00 AEDT (UTC+11:00)

New Zealand	30—26	United States
	1st: 20–16; 2nd: 10–10; Source

WIN Entertainment Centre, Wollongong
Referees: Steve Hewson (Australia), Anthony Bishop
Touch judges: Laurent Bonnet (France), Jake Brook
Player of the Match: Nikia Fa'atau (New Zealand)

==== 5th-place play-offs ====
12 November 2026
13:30 AEDT (UTC+11:00)

Wales	52—30	Scotland
	1st: 28–10; 2nd: 24–20; Source

WIN Entertainment Centre, Wollongong
Referees: Karli Wilkinson (England), Luke Anderson
Touch judges: Robert Burgin, Maxine Godinet
Player of the Match: Fionn McCabe (Wales)

==== 3rd-place play-off ====
13 November 2026
17:15 AEDT (UTC+11:00)

Ireland	24–70	Australia
Tries: Horgan 8'; Spain 50'; Calcott 54'; Mangan 62'; Johnston 69'; Goals: Johnston (1/3); Spain (1/2)	1st: 4–40; 2nd: 20–30; Report	Tries: Cannane 1'; Popple 3', 6'; Karim 11', 26'; Anstey 13', 41', 44'; McKenna 29', 75', 78'; Luff 72'; Goals: Karim (4/5); McKenna (7/7)

WIN Entertainment Centre, Wollongong
Referees: Jake Brook (England), Laurent Bonnet (France)
Touch judges: Maxine Godinet (France), Robert Burgin (Australia)
Player of the Match: Daniel Anstey (Australia)

==== Final ====
13 November 2026
19:45 AEDT (UTC+11:00)

England	50–38	France
Tries: Coyd 4', 7', 31', 57'; Hawkins 35', 43'; Brown 39', 62', 69'; Goals: Hawkins (1/2); Collins (6/7)	1st: 28–22; 2nd: 22–16; Report	Tries: Bourson 11'; L Hivernat 19'; Doré 22'; Guttadoro 27'; Denuwelaere 41', 60', 79'; Goals: L Hivernat (3/4); N Clausells (2/3)

WIN Entertainment Centre, Wollongong
Referees: Rebecca Whiteley (England), Stephane Vincent (France)
Touch judges: Tim Robinson (Australia), Ollie Cruickshank (Scotland)
Player of the Match: Joe Coyd (England)

Team details
England		Position	France
Name	Number	Position	Number	Name
Joe Coyd	1	Starter	1	Jonathan Hivernat
Rob Hawkins	2	Starter	2	Damien Dore
Tristan Norfolk	3	Starter	3	Florian Guttadoro
Lewis King	4	Starter	4	Jeremy Bourson
Mason Billington	5	Starter	5	Leo Hivernat
Nathan Collins	6	Interchange	6	Gilles Clausells
Luis Domingos	7	Interchange	7	Dany Denuwaelere
Jack Brown	8	Interchange	8	Jorge Gelade Panzo
Fin O'Neil	9	Reserve	9	Nicolas Clausells
Tom Coyd		Coach		Cyril Torres

== November ==
=== Philippines men v Japan ===
21 November 2026
17:30 PST (UTC+08:00)

Philippines	30–6	Japan
	Report

International School Manila, Taguig City
