= Janai Haupapa =

Canadian rugby player (born 1993)

Janai Haupapa (born 14 March 1993) is a former women's rugby union and rugby league footballer from Calgary, Alberta, Canada. She plays for the Canada women's national rugby league team and has played for the Canada women's national rugby union team's development side as a centre.

== History ==
Haupapa plays rugby union for Calgary Rams RFC. In 2015, she was called up to the Canada women's national rugby union development team for their tour of England and made her debut playing in the second row at Molesey Road in Hersham.

In 2017, Haupapa switched codes to rugby league in order to join up with Canada's first ever women's national rugby league squad in time for the 2017 Women's Rugby League World Cup. She along with the majority of the team were rugby union players with only one having played rugby league prior and Haupapa was still a member of Calgary Rams RFC at the time. However during the tournament where she made her international rugby league debut, she was accused of biting the Australia women's national rugby league team captain Renae Kunst. Despite support from Canada's coach Mike Castle, Haupapa pleaded guilty to the charge and received a two match ban which meant that she missed Canada's semi-final match and the rest of the tournament. This was the fourth allegation of biting that had been levied at a player during the 2017 Women's Rugby League World Cup with the England women's national rugby league team and the Papua New Guinea women's national rugby league team players also being accused of biting. In 2022, Haupapa was in her house when a large mirror fell on her head giving her a concussion. She has not played a Rugby match since then.
