= Americas 9s =

Americas Nines
- Sport: Rugby league
- Instituted: 2018
- Inaugural season: 2019
- Number of teams: 4 Male; 2 Female
- Country: Canada
- Winners: United States (men's); Canada (women's)

The Americas Nines is a rugby league nines competition staged by the Canada Rugby League and was founded in 2018. The first tournament occurred on May 18, 2019 at Lamport Stadium in Toronto, Ontario, Canada.

== 2019 ==
=== Men's pool ===
Place	Team	Record (W-D-L)
1st place, gold medalist(s)	United States	3-1-0
2nd place, silver medalist(s)	Canada	2-1-1
3rd place, bronze medalist(s)	Jamaica	2-0-2
4	Latin Heat	0-0-4

==== Round 1 ====
18 May 2019	Canada	24 – 6	Jamaica	Toronto, Canada
12:20pm EST	Bonus point tries: Tries: Conversions:	RLIF Facebook	Tries: Conversions:	Stadium: Lamport Stadium

18 May 2019	United States	30 – 4	Latin Heat	Toronto, Canada
12:50pm EST	Bonus point tries: Tries: Conversions:	RLIF Facebook	Tries: Conversions:	Stadium: Lamport Stadium

==== Round 2 ====
18 May 2019	Canada	28 – 0	Latin Heat	Toronto, Canada
2:00pm EST	Bonus point tries: Tries: Conversions:	RLIF Facebook	Tries: Conversions:	Stadium: Lamport Stadium

18 May 2019	United States	18 – 4	Jamaica	Toronto, Canada
2:30pm EST	Bonus point tries: Tries: Conversions:	RLIF Facebook	Tries: Conversions:	Stadium: Lamport Stadium

==== Round 3 ====
18 May 2019	United States	14 – 14	Canada	Toronto, Canada
3:45pm EST	Bonus point tries: Tries: Conversions:	RLIF Facebook	Tries: Conversions:	Stadium: Lamport Stadium

18 May 2019	Latin Heat	10 - 16	Jamaica	Toronto, Canada
4:15pm EST	Bonus point tries: Tries: Conversions:	RLIF Facebook	Tries: Conversions:	Stadium: Lamport Stadium

==== Consolation final ====
18 May 2019	Latin Heat	4 - 34	Jamaica	Toronto, Canada
5:30pm EST	Bonus point tries: Tries: Conversions:	RLIF Facebook	Tries: Conversions:	Stadium: Lamport Stadium

==== Final ====
18 May 2019	United States	20 - 8	Canada	Toronto, Canada
6:00pm EST	Bonus point tries: Tries: Conversions:	RLIF Facebook	Tries: Conversions:	Stadium: Lamport Stadium

=== Women's pool ===
Place	Team	Record (W-D-L)
1st place, gold medalist(s)	Canada	2-0-0
2nd place, silver medalist(s)	Ontario	1-0-1
3rd place, bronze medalist(s)	Jamaica	0-0-2

==== Squads ====
The Women's squads were named on the Canada Rugby League website.

- Canada: Chelsea Brathwaite, Fedelia Omoghan, MacKenzie Fane, Megean Gosselin, Megan Pakulis, Natalie Tam, Natasha Naismith, Petra Woods, Tamisha Toussaint, Taylor Jordan, and Tiera Reynolds. Coach: Andy Ireland.
- Jamaica: Amoy Bailey, Chrystal Grove, Davine Burton, Gabriella Brown, Jasmine Hector, Kadesha Esson, Kadina McKenzie, Khadeshia Thompson, Rachel Mighty, Rose Baker, and Tamara Dixon. Coach: Clarence Brown.
- Ontario: Ben Skinner, Hailey Karroum, Jessica Cormier, Karlie-Rae Robinson, Krista Kent, Lea Milosevic, Sara Canini, Sarah Galati, Sienna Gulino, and Stephanie Hovdestad. Team Manager: Avery Akkerman.
  - Note: Although only 10 players were named in the article, video of the games shows that Ontario had 11 players.

==== Matches ====
18 May 2019	Ontario	0 - 28	Canada	Toronto, Canada
1:20pm EST	Tries: nil Conversions: nil	RLIF Facebook; Facebook Video (Kick-off at 1:04:13)	Tries: 6 Conversions: 2	Stadium: Lamport Stadium

18 May 2019	Jamaica	4 - 24	Ontario	Toronto, Canada
3:00pm EST	Tries: 1 Conversions: nil	RLIF Facebook; Facebook Video (Kick-off at 1:03:07)	Tries: 6 Conversions: nil	Stadium: Lamport Stadium

18 May 2019	Canada	26 - 0	Jamaica	Toronto, Canada
4:45pm EST	Tries: 6 Conversions: 1	RLIF Facebook; Facebook Video (Kick-off at 1:08:03)	Tries: nil Conversions: nil	Stadium: Lamport Stadium
