= Scotland women's national rugby league team =

Women's national rugby league team

Scotland
Team information
- Governing body: Scotland Rugby League
- Region: Europe
- Head coach: Ady Picton
- IRL ranking: 17 ▲3 (20 August 2026)

Uniforms
First colours

Team results
- First international
- Wales 18–12 Scotland (Neath, Wales; 3 August 2025)

The Scotland women's national rugby league team represents Scotland in women's rugby league. They are administered by Scotland Rugby League.

== History ==
In May 2018, Scotland Rugby League announced that they would include a women's section at their development day and sought to find players eligible to play for a Scotland women's team. The following year Andrea Dobson was appointed to be the first head coach for a women's national team to be launched with the aim of taking part in the 2021 Women's Emerging Nations World Championship. (Note: This would have been held as part of the 2021 Festival of World Cups) However, in March 2020, rugby league in Scotland was suspended due to the COVID-19 pandemic and in August 2020, the tournament was cancelled, leading to the establishment of a Scotland women's team being postponed.

In February 2025, Scotland Rugby League announced a new coaching setup for the women's team, with John Whalley taking on the role of head coach. The first train-on squad for the Scotland women's team was announced in April 2025 along with plans for their initial matches, later confirmed to be against Wales in August and a tri-series with Jamaica and England Community Lions beginning in October. Scotland were also invited to take part in the RFL Women's Nines in July 2025, but withdrew shortly before the competition. (Note: Note that several members of the Scotland squad for their first international played for clubs that took part in the 2025 Nines)

On 3 August 2025, Scotland made their international debut against Wales. Their first try was scored by Grace Field in the opening minutes of the match. Scotland, who trailed 12–10 at half time, drew level in the second half, but ultimately lost 18–12 with Wales scoring the winning try in the last two minutes of the match. On 1 November 2025, Scotland recorded their first victory with a 38–12 win over Jamaica. In January 2026, assistant coach Ady Picton, was appointed as head coach of the team. In February 2026, Scotland defeated the United States 26–14 in a match played as part of a Las Vegas triple-header alongside men's senior and under-19's matches.

== Players ==
=== Current squad ===
Squad for match against United States on 27 February 2026. Tallies in the table include the full international matches (against Wales, Jamaica, and the USA).

J#	Player	Position(s)	Club	Debut	M	T	G	Pts
1	Rebecca Smart	Fullback	London Broncos	2025	3	1	0	4
2	Raphaella Aquilina	Wing	Bristol Golden Ferns	2025	2	1	0	4
3	Stephanie Gray	Centre, Second-row	Salford Red Devils	2025	3	1	0	4
4	Enya Lackie	Centre	Bristol Golden Ferns	2025	3	0	0	0
5	Olivia Barnard	Wing	Wigan St Patricks	2026	1	0	0	0
6	Emma Welsford	Stand-off, Centre	Swinton Lionesses	2025	3	1	0	4
7	Isabel Glover	Scrum-half	Thatto Heath Crusaders	2025	3	0	0	0
13	Georgia Briggs	Prop, Second-row	Swinton Lionesses	2025	3	0	0	0
9	Cerys Gregory	Hooker	York Valkyrie	2025	2	0	0	0
10	Robyn Price	Prop	Bristol Golden Ferns	2025	2	0	0	0
14	Samantha Simpson	Second-row, Centre	Swinton Lionesses	2025	2	2	0	8
12	Ciorstaidh Ainsworth	Second-row	Stirling County RFC	2025	2	0	0	0
8	Nicole Stewart	Loose forward, Second-row	Barrow Raiders	2025	2	1	3	10
11	Grace Field	Prop	Leeds Rhinos	2025	3	2	0	8
15	Morgan Pearson	Hooker	Swinton Lionesses	2025	3	0	0	0
16	Betti Ginnelly	interchange	Stewartry RFC	2026	1	0	0	0
17	Rebecca White	interchange	Workington Town	2025	2	0	0	0

=== Past squads ===
Team for the inaugural match against Wales on 3 August 2025.

J#	Player	Position	Club
1	Rebecca Smart	Fullback	London Broncos
2	Sarah Smart	Wing	London Broncos
3	Sammi Simpson	Centre	Swinton Lionesses
4	Emma Welsford	Centre	Swinton Lionesses
5	Evie Tonkin	Wing	Workington Town
6	Demi Fisher	Stand-off	Swinton Lionesses
7	Isabel Glover	Scrum-half	Thatto Heath Crusaders
8	Grace Field	Prop	Leeds Rhinos
9	Abi Gordon	Hooker	Leigh Leopards
10	Kaiya Glynn	Prop	Leeds Rhinos
11	Charlotte Hill	Second-row	Swinton Lionesses
12	Stephanie Gray	Second-row	Salford Red Devils
13	Nicole Stewart	Loose forward	Barrow Raiders
14	Morgan Pearson	interchange	Swinton Lionesses
15	Georgia Briggs	interchange	Oulton Raidettes
16	Rebecca Moffat	interchange	Cartha Queens Park RFC
17	Enya Lackie	interchange	Bristol Golden Ferns
18	Ciorstaidh Ainsworth	—	Stirling County RFC
19	Betti Ginnelly	—	Stewartry Sirens RFC

== Head to head records ==
Opponent	FM	MR	M	W	D	L	Win%	PF	PA	Share
Canada	2026	2026	1	0	0	1	0.00%	4	34	10.53%
England Amateurs	2025	2025	1	0	0	1	0.00%	4	18	18.18%
Jamaica	2025	2025	1	1	0	0	100.00%	38	12	76.00%
Netherlands	2026	2026	1	1	0	0	100.00%	54	0	100.00%
United States	2026	2026	1	1	0	0	100.00%	26	14	65.00%
Wales	2026	2026	1	0	0	1	0.00%	12	18	28.57%
Totals	2025	2026	6	3	0	3	50.00%	138	96	58.97%

== Results ==
Date	Opponent	Score (Note: Scotland score given first)	Tournament	Venue	Video	Report(s)
3 Aug 2025	Wales	12–18	International	The Gnoll, Neath, Wales		
18 Oct 2025	England Amateurs	4–18	Friendly	Pilkington Recs, St Helens, England		
1 Nov 2025	Jamaica	38–12	International	Featherstone Lions, Featherstone, England		
27 Feb 2026	United States	26–14	International	(United States) Coronado High School, Henderson, Nevada, USA		
25 Jul 2026	Canada	4–34	International	Mansfield Park, Hawick, Scotland		
17 Oct 2026	Netherlands	54–0	International	Castricum Rugby Club, Netherlands		
