= Netherlands women's national rugby league team =

Netherlands

Team information
- Governing body: Netherlands Rugby League Bond
- Region: Europe
- Head coach: (England) Matt Rigby
- Captain: (Netherlands) Vera van der Zwan
- Top try-scorer: Nicole Kennedy (8)
- Top point-scorer: Nicole Kennedy (32)
- IRL ranking: 16 ▼2 (20 August 2026)

Team results
- First game
- Greece 0 – 14 Netherlands (9 December 2023)
- Biggest win
- Italy 6 – 56 Netherlands (27 April 2024)
- Biggest defeat
- Netherlands 0 – 54 Scotland (17 October 2026)

The Netherlands women's national rugby league team represents the Netherlands in women's rugby league. The team's first international was a 14–0 victory in a friendly against Greece on 9 December 2023. On this evening the "A" team played a friendly match against Greece "A".

== Head to head records ==
Opponent	FM	MR	M	W	D	L	Win%	PF	PA	Share
Greece	2023	2025	2	2	0	0	100.00%	48	0	100.00%
Italy	2024	2024	1	1	0	0	100.00%	56	6	90.32%
Ireland	2024	2025	2	0	0	2	0.00%	18	58	23.68%
Wales	2024	2024	1	0	0	1	0.00%	6	48	11.11%
Scotland	2026	2026	1	0	0	1	0.00%	0	54	0.00%
Totals	2023	2026	7	3	0	4	42.86%	128	166	43.54%

Notes:

- Table last updated 17 October 2026.
- Share is the portion of "For" points compared to the sum of "For" and "Against" points.

== Inaugural squad ==
The following 19-player squad was named to play Greece on 9 December 2023:

- 1. Nicole Kennedy
- 2. Danique Nikkels
- 3. Lisa Berding (VC)
- 4. Anniek Nauta
- 5. Hannah Van Beukering
- 6. Hiske Blom
- 7. Rixt Aerts
- 8. Sela Steenkist
- 9. Vera van der Zwan (C)
- 10. Lorraine Voorbach
- 11. Clara Terlouw
- 12. Sylvie Moelee
- 13. Linneke Gevers
- 14. Stephanie Van Diepen
- 15. Lotte Westerlaken
- 16. Kyra Elzinga
- 17. Dominique Velema
- 18. Dunja Witmond
- 19. Iris Hansman

== Current squad ==
The following squad was named to play Greece on 13 December 2025. The selected team was posted of social media on the morning of the match.

Tallies in the table include the match played on 13 December 2025.

J#	Position	Player	Club	Debut	Caps	T	G	Pts
1	Fullback, Stand-off	Hiske Blom	Rochdale Hornets	2023	6	3	0	12
2	Wing	Hannah van Beukering	Unattached	2023	5	2	0	8
3	Centre	Michelle Jurgens	Unattached	2025	1	0	0	0
4	Centre, Fullback	Nicole Kennedy	London Broncos	2023	5	8	0	32
5	Wing, Centre	Monischa Hieroms	Unattached	2024	5	1	0	4
6	Stand-off, Hooker	Vera Van Der Zwan	Rochdale Hornets	2023	6	1	0	4
7	Scrum-half	Rixt Aerts	Unattached	2023	6	0	0	0
8	Prop	Eva Peroti	Rochdale Hornets	2025	2	0	0	0
9	Hooker	Merel van den Bosch	Unattached	2025	1	0	0	0
10	Prop	Fiona Kalf	Unattached	2025	2	0	0	0
11	Second-row, Loose forward	Lisa Berding	Rochdale Hornets	2023	5	2	5	18
12	Second-row, Wing	Sydney Kalf	Unattached	2025	1	1	0	4
13	Loose forward	Kaylee Geerlings	Rochdale Hornets	2024	4	2	5	18
14	Second-row	Lisanne van het Schip	Unattached	2025	1	0	0	0
15	interchange	Iris Hansman	Unattached	2024	3	0	0	0
16	Second-row	Ymke Keppel	Unattached	2025	1	0	0	0
17	interchange	Jiske van Velzen	Unattached	2025	1	0	0	0
18	—	Elien de Graaf	Unattached	—	0	0	0	0
19	interchange	Eline Zomer	Unattached	2025	1	0	0	0

Notes:

- Lisanne van het Schip and Ymke Keppel previously played for the Netherlands against the Royal Air Force in October 2024.

== Heritage numbers ==
If played a match for the Dutch National Team they're assigned a heritage number. The following 34 players have an official assigned legacy number:

- 1. Stephanie Van Diepen
- 2. Lisa Berding
- 3. Clara Terlouw
- 4. Dana Burik
- 5. Lotte Westerlaken
- 6. Johanna van Kieft
- 7. Hiske Blom
- 8. Fenne van Putten
- 9. Vera van der Zwan
- 10. Dominique Velema
- 11. Senta Sailino
- 12. Iris Hansman
- 13. Jessica Kool
- 14. Nicole Kennedy
- 15. Chantal Meeldijk
- 16. Ai-Ling Schoolderman
- 17. Ellinor de Bever
- 18. Ymke Keppel
- 19. Sverre Verheul
- 20. Dunja Witmond
- 21. Hannah Van Beukering
- 22. Lorraine Voorbach
- 23. Danique Nikkels
- 24. Maura Mevis
- 25. Linneke Gevers
- 26. Fleur Michiels
- 27. Tessa van Zanten
- 28. Sylvie Moelee
- 29. Sela Steenkist
- 30. Rixt Aerts
- 31. Kyra Elzinga
- 32. Ophelie Thijm
- 34. Chitra van den Boom
- 35. Paige Schouw
- 36. Claire Kennedy
- 37. Monischa Hieroms

== Results ==
Date	Score (Note: Netherlands score given first)	Opponent	Tournament	Venue	Video	Report(s)
9 Dec 2023	14–0	Greece	International	Municipal Stadium Dimitris Nikolaidis, Athens		
27 Apr 2024	56–6	Italy	World Cup Qualifier (Preliminarily Playoff)	Maurizio Quaggia Stadium, Mogliano Veneto		
19 May 2024	12–16	Ireland	World Cup Qualifier (European Group A)	Energia Park, Dublin		
22 Jun 2024	6–48	Wales	World Cup Qualifier (European Group A)	Rugby Club Waterland, Purmerend		
05 Oct 2024	48–8	(United Kingdom) Royal Air Force	Friendly	NRCA Stadium, Amsterdam		
08 Oct 2024	56–0	(United Kingdom) Royal Air Force	Friendly	British School, Voorschoten		
4 Oct 2025	6–42	Ireland	International	Rugby Club The Bassetts. Sassenheim		
13 Dec 2025	34–0	Greece	International	Rugby Club Sparta, Rotterdam	—	
17 Oct 2026	0–54	Scotland	International	Castricum Rugby Club, Netherlands	—	
