= Canada women's national rugby league team =

Canada
Team information
- Nickname: Ravens
- Governing body: Canada Rugby League
- Region: The Americas
- Head coach: Matt Barron
- Captain: Gabrielle Hindley; Megan Pakulis
- Most caps: Megan Pakulis (11)
- Top try-scorer: Petra Woods (8); Megan Pakulis (8)
- Top point-scorer: Dani Frananda (44)
- Home stadium: Lamport Stadium
- IRL ranking: 7 ▲6 (20 August 2026)

Uniforms
First colours	Second colours

Team results
- First international
- Canada 4 — 50 New Zealand (Sydney, Australia, 16 November 2017)
- Biggest win
- Canada 64 — 2 Jamaica (Kingston, Jamaica, 27 September 2023)
- Biggest defeat
- Canada 0 — 88 Australia (Sydney, Australia, 22 November 2017)
- World Cup
- Appearances: 2 (first time in 2017)
- Best result: Semi-finalist (2017)

The Canada women's national rugby league team, also known as the Canadian Ravens, represents Canada in international rugby league football tournaments.

Canada made their debut full international debut in the 2017 Women's Rugby League World Cup, winning one of their three pool matches and making the semi-finals of the six-team tournament.

The Ravens toured Serbia in September 2019, winning both matches.

In 2022, Canada hosted the United States of America in April 2022, met Ireland in late October and then in November played three matches in the postponed 2021 Women's Rugby League World Cup.

In September 2023, the Ravens travelled to Jamaica, winning both their matches in the Americas North Championships.

In the qualification process for the 2026 World Cup, Canada won the Americas tournament but lost to Fiji in the semi-finals of the World Series.

== Head to Head Records ==
Opponent	FM	MR	M	W	D	L	Win%	PF	PA	Share
New Zealand	2017	2017	1	0	0	1	0.00%	4	50	7.41%
Papua New Guinea	2017	2022	2	1	0	1	50.00%	34	42	44.74%
Australia	2017	2017	2	0	0	2	0.00%	6	146	4.11%
Serbia	2019	2019	2	2	0	0	100.00%	60	10	85.71%
United States	2022	2024	3	3	0	0	100.00%	112	22	83.58%
Ireland	2022	2025	2	1	0	1	50.00%	42	14	75.00%
England	2022	2022	1	0	0	1	0.00%	4	54	6.90%
Brazil	2022	2022	1	1	0	0	100.00%	22	16	57.89%
Jamaica	2023	2023	1	1	0	0	100.00%	64	2	96.97%
Fiji	2025	2025	1	0	0	1	0.00%	0	48	0.00%
Wales	2026	2026	1	1	0	0	100.00%	14	0	100.00%
Scotland	2026	2026	1	1	0	0	100.00%	34	4	89.47%
Totals	2017	2026	18	11	0	7	61.11%	396	408	49.25%

Notes:

- Table last updated 25 July 2026.
- Share is the portion of "For" points compared to the sum of "For" and "Against" points.

== Current squad ==
Canada announced an extended 33-woman squad on 10 September. A final squad of 20 players was announced on social media on 13 October 2025.

Head Coach: Matt Barron

J#	Player	Age	Position(s)	Debut	M	T	G	Pts	Club
–	Ada Okonkwo	–	Prop	2022	7	0	0	0	BC Storm
–	Alanna Fittes	–	Hooker, Fullback	2022	3	1	0	4	Alberta Broncos
–	Alayna Scramstad	–	Stand-off	—	0	0	0	0	BC Storm
–	Beth Hoffstetter	–	Second-row	—	0	0	0	0	Ontario Osprey
–	Caitlin Sears	–	Hooker	2024	1	1	3	10	Sydenham Swans
–	Candace Kelly Scholten	–	Centre	2022	3	2	0	8	Ontario Osprey
–	Chantelle Crowl	32	Prop, Second-row	2023	3	4	0	16	St Helens
–	Danielle Franada	–	Stand-off, Centre	2022	6	1	20	44	Alberta Broncos
–	Eleta Mitton	–	Loose forward	2024	1	0	0	0	Ontario Osprey
–	Gabrielle Hindley	33	Second-row, Hooker	2019	9	4	0	16	BC Storm
–	Grace Campbell	–	Centre	—	0	0	0	0	Alberta Broncos
–	Lauren Mueller	–	Wing, Fullback	2022	7	0	0	0	London Broncos
–	Maddie Hobson	–	Wing	—	0	0	0	0	Ontario Osprey
–	Maddy Aberg	28	Second-row, Centre	2022	7	2	2	12	Alberta Broncos
–	Megan Pakulis	28	Loose forward, Second-row	2017	11	8	0	32	Gold Coast Titans
–	Petra Woods	30	Fullback, Centre	2022	7	8	0	32	Ontario Osprey
–	Rachel Choboter	–	Second-row	2022	5	1	0	4	Otahuhu Leopards
–	Rebecca Kochuk	–	interchange	—	0	0	0	0	Alberta Broncos
–	Sarah Maguire	38	Loose forward, Prop	2022	7	2	0	8	Alberta Broncos
–	Natasha Naismith	37	Scrum-half, Stand-off	2019	5	2	6	20	Ontario Osprey

== Results ==
Date	Opponent	Score	Tournament	Venue	Video	Report(s)
6 Oct 2017	Corrimal Cougars	26–20	World Cup Warm-Up Matches	King George Park, Richmond, British Columbia	—	
8 Oct 2017	Corrimal Cougars	18–20	World Cup Warm-Up Matches	King George Park, Richmond, British Columbia	—	
10 Nov 2017	Queensland Nga Hau e Wha Māori	12–38	World Cup Warm-Up Matches	Owen Park, Southport, Queensland	—	
16 Nov 2017	New Zealand	4–50	2017 World Cup	Southern Cross Group Stadium, Sydney		
19 Nov 2017	Papua New Guinea	22–8	2017 World Cup	Southern Cross Group Stadium, Sydney		
22 Nov 2017	Australia	0–88	2017 World Cup	Southern Cross Group Stadium, Sydney		
26 Nov 2017	Australia	6–58	2017 World Cup	Southern Cross Group Stadium, Sydney		
14 Sep 2019	Serbia	34–6	2 Test Series	SC inge, Belgrade	—	
21 Sep 2019	Serbia	26–4	2 Test Series	Makiš Stadium, Belgrade	—	
16 Apr 2022	United States	42–10	Test Match	Burnaby Lake Regional Park		
25 Oct 2022	Ireland	6–8	Test Match	Orrell St James Rugby League Club, Wigan	—	
1 Nov 2022	Papua New Guinea	12–34	2021 World Cup	Headingley Stadium, Leeds		
5 Nov 2022	England	4–54	2021 World Cup	DW Stadium, Wigan		
9 Nov 2022	Brazil	22–16	2021 World Cup	Headingley Stadium, Leeds		
25 Sep 2023	United States	30–4	Americas North Championships	University of West Indies, Kingston		
27 Sep 2023	Jamaica	64–2	Americas North Championships	University of West Indies, Kingston		
6 Nov 2024	USA Pioneers	80–0	Friendly	University of North Florida, Jacksonville, Florida		
9 Nov 2024	United States	40–8	2026 World Cup Qualification – Americas Qualifiers	University of North Florida, Jacksonville, Florida		
27 Aug 2025	Fiji Rise Academy	8–30	Ravens Tour of Fiji	Churchill Park, Lautoka	—	
30 Aug 2025	Fiji Residents	12–34	Ravens Tour of Fiji	Churchill Park, Lautoka	—	
21 Oct 2025	Fiji	0–48	2026 World Cup Qualification – World Series	Terry Fox Stadium, Brampton, Ontario		
26 Oct 2025	Ireland	36–6	2026 World Cup Qualification – World Series	Terry Fox Stadium, Brampton, Ontario		
19 Jul 2026	Wales	14–0	Ravens Tour of Great Britain	The Gnoll, Neath		
25 Jul 2026	Scotland	34–4	Ravens Tour of Great Britain	Mansfield Park, Hawick		

=== Nines ===
Date	Opponent	Score	Tournament	Venue	Video	Report(s)
23 Feb 2018	Tonga	4–8	2018 Commonwealth Championship	Dolphin Stadium, Brisbane		
23 Feb 2018	Cook Islands	12–20	2018 Commonwealth Championship	Dolphin Stadium, Brisbane		
24 Feb 2018	Fiji	16–12	2018 Commonwealth Championship	Dolphin Stadium, Brisbane		
18 May 2019	Jamaica	26–0	Americas 9s	Lamport Stadium, Toronto	—	

== Records ==
=== Margins and streaks ===
Biggest winning margins

Margin	Score	Opponent	Venue	Date
56	58–2	Jamaica	UWI Mona Bowl	27 Sep 2023
32	40–8	United States	Hodges Stadium	9 Nov 2024
32	42–10	United States	Burnaby Lake	16 Apr 2022
30	36–6	Ireland	Terry Fox Stadium	26 Oct 2025
28	34–6	Serbia	Makiš Stadium	14 Sept 2019
26	30–4	United States	UWI Mona Bowl	25 Sep 2023
14	22–8	Papua New Guinea	Southern Cross Group Stadium	19 Nov 2017

Biggest losing margins

Margin	Score	Opponent	Venue	Date
88	0–88	Australia	Southern Cross Group Stadium	22 Nov 2017
52	6–58	Australia	Southern Cross Group Stadium	26 Nov 2017
50	4–54	England	DW Stadium	5 Nov 2022
48	0–48	Fiji	Terry Fox Stadium	21 Oct 2025
46	4–50	New Zealand	Southern Cross Group Stadium	16 Nov 2017
22	12–34	Papua New Guinea	Headingley Stadium	1 Nov 2022

== Past squads ==
=== 2017 World Cup ===
Squad to the 2017 Women's Rugby League World Cup: Maira Acevedo (British Columbia), Gillian Boag (British Columbia), Nina Bui (Ontario), Andrea Burk (British Columbia), Christina Burnham (British Columbia), Mackenzie Fane (Ontario), Kathleen Grudzinski (British Columbia), Janai Haupapa (Alberta), Michelle Helmeczi (Alberta), Natalie King (British Columbia), Kelcey Leavitt (Alberta), Mandy Marchak (British Columbia), Sabrina McDaid (Ontario), Wealtha Jade Menin Naglis (Alberta), Fedelia Omoghan (Ontario), Megan Pakulis (Ontario), Irene Patrinos (Ontario), Stevi Schnoor (British Columbia), Natasha Smith (British Columbia), Elizabeth Steele (Alberta), Natalie Tam (Ontario), Tiera Thomas-Reynolds (Ontario), Barbara Waddell (Forrestville Ferrets), and Petra Woods (Ontario).
The team was coached by Mike Castle.

=== Tour of Serbia ===
The following players participated in the two Test Match tour of Serbia in September 2019: Chantalle Bracken (Jersey number 11), Tanya Dordevic (12), Brittany Douglas (16), Sarah Duncan (6), MacKenzie Fane (13) (Captain), Jennifer Garford (10), Simran Gillar (17), Megean Gosselin (3), Gabrielle Hindley (15), Hailey Karoum (9), Krista Kent (8), Sabrina McDaid (2), Lea Milošević (4), Natasha Naismith (7), Kaila Pickering (1), Melissa Šešelja (5), and Ben Skinner (14).
The team was coached by Ben Fleming.

=== United States in April 2022 ===
The following players participated in the Ravens' Test Match on Saturday, 16 April 2022.
Alanna Fittes, Brittany Jones, Ferris Sandboe, Candace Scholten, Petra Woods, Natasha Naismith, Sabrina McDaid, Kristy Sargent, Natalie Tam, Elizabeth Steele, Gabrielle Hindley, Sarah Maguire, Megan Pakulis, Christina Burnham, Ada Okonkwo, Demi Swann, and Zoey Siciliano.
The team was coached by Mike Castle.
The following players participated in a development, or "Select" team match that was held on 16 April 2022, prior to the Test Match.
Ashley Holt, Miriama Naibosali, Megan Buchanan, Savannah Bacchas, Brittany Douglas, Steph Hovdestad, Krista Kent, Alix Evans, Tamisha Toussaint, Maddy Aberg, Valerie Wideski, and Katie Grudzinski. There were four players that played in both the "Select" match and the Test match, namely: Brittany Jones, Zoey Siciliano, Demi Swann and Christina Burnham.

=== 2021 World Cup ===
Squad to the postponed 2021 Women's Rugby League World Cup held in November 2022: Maddy Aberg (jersey number 14), Nina Bui (15), Rachel Choboter (16), Brittany Douglas (17), Alix Evans (18), Alanna Fittes (6), Dani Frananda (1), Karina Gauto (5), Gabrielle Hindley (11) (Captain), Brittany Jones (2), Sarah Maguire (12), Laura Mariu (10), Sabrina McDaid (7), Jade Menin (19), Lauren Mueller (20), Natasha Naismith (21), Ada Okonkwo (22), Megan Pakulis (13), Ferris Sandboe (3), Kristy Sargent (8), Zoey Siciliano (23), Elizabeth Steele (24), Natalie Tam (9), and Petra Woods (4).
The team was coached by Mike Castle.

=== 2023 Americas North tournament in Jamaica ===
Squad for the 2023 Americas North tournament held in September 2023: Maddy Aberg (jersey number in game two, 4). Fedelia Angeles (Omoghan) (17), Savannah Bacchus (game one 14), Matilda Butler (game one 4). Rachel Choboter (12). Chantelle Crowl (11), Dani Franada (6), Erin Gawley (2), Gabrielle Hindley (9), Brittany Jones (game one 5), Ale Lewis (7), Ada Okonkwo-Dappa (16), Megan Pakulis (13), Sarah Maguire (10), Lauren Mueller (3), Ferris Sandboe (5), Elizabeth Steele (8), Natalie Tam (14), Tamisha Toussaint (15), and Petra Woods (1).
The team was coached by Mike Castle and managed by Katie Grudzinski.

== See also ==
- Toronto Wolfpack
- Rugby league in Canada
