= 2026 Rugby League European Championships =

Rugby league tournaments

The 2026 Rugby League European Championships were a series of rugby league tournaments for European Rugby League (ERL) men's national teams held in October 2026.

The tournament followed the same format as the previous edition, with fixtures being confirmed in September 2026.

== Euro B ==
2026 European Championship B
- Number of teams: 3
- Host country: Serbia
- Winner: Netherlands
- Matches played: 3

=== Standings ===
Pos	Team	Pld	W	D	L	PF	PA	PD	Pts	Qualification
1	Netherlands	2	2	0	0	66	52	+14	4	
2	Ukraine	2	1	0	1	52	42	+10	2	
3	Serbia	2	0	0	2	44	68	−24	0	Relegated to Euro C

=== Matches ===
18 October 2026
14:00 CEST (UTC+02:00)

Serbia	14–30	Ukraine
Tries: Pavlović (7), Ditchmen (54), Walker (67); Goals: Walker (1/3)	1st: 4–24; 2nd: 10–6; Report	Tries: Beggs-Mowczan (20, 30), Puchkov (27), Fomiuk (35), Sluvinsky (48); Goals: Skorbach (5/5)

FK Zemun Stadium, Belgrade
Attendance: ~300
Referee: Andrew Pilkington (Spain)

21 October 2026
14:00 CEST (UTC+02:00)

Ukraine	22–28	Netherlands
Tries: Sciglitano (10), Skorbach (38), Beggs-Mowczan (43), Kolisnyk (56), Fomiuk (76); Goals: Diachenko (0/1), Skorbach (1/4)	1st: 10–16; 2nd: 12–12; Report	Tries: Niumata (15), Koolstra (21, 67), Kuijpers (30), Keating (71); Goals: Koolstra (2/3), Baats (2/2)

FK Zemun Stadium, Belgrade
Referee: Petar Randjelović (Serbia)

24 October 2026
14:00 CEST (UTC+02:00)

Netherlands	38–30	Serbia
Tries: Razoux-Schultz (3, 48), Haringa (7), R. Barbuto (13), Kuijpeters (46), Vonken (57), M. Barbuto (63); Goals: Koolstra (5/6), Baats (0/1)	1st: 14–16; 2nd: 24–14; Report	Tries: Walker (?), Pavlović (10, 72), Saban (15), Pipović (29, 41), Vuković (59); Goals: Walker (2/5), Jasari (1/1)

FK Zemun Stadium, Belgrade
Referee: Andrew Pilkington (Spain)

== Euro C ==
2026 European Championship C
- Number of teams: 3
- Winner: Greece
- Matches played: 3

=== Standings ===
Pos	Team	Pld	W	D	L	PF	PA	PD	Pts	Qualification
1	Greece	2	2	0	0	88	32	+56	4	Promoted to Euro B
2	Malta	2	1	0	1	47	48	−1	2	
3	Germany	2	0	0	2	42	97	−55	0	Relegated to Euro D

=== Matches ===
3 October 2026
14:00 CEST (UTC+02:00)

Germany	28–29	Malta
Tries: Adams (4), Kay (15), Smith (20, 19), McConnell (43); Goals: Rau (3/5)	1st: 22–12; 2nd: 6–17; Report	Tries: Gatt (9), Galea (30, 48, 60), Strickland (50); Goals: Galea (1/1), Sammut (2/4); Drop goals: Sammut (1/1)

Sportsplatz Welper, Hattingen
Attendance: > 500
Referee: Misa Vakadranu (Fiji)

10 October 2026
18:00 CEST (UTC+02:00)

Malta	18–20	Greece
Tries: Mamo (29), Gatt (45, 79); Goals: Sammut (3/3)	1st: 6–10; 2nd: 12–10; Report	Tries: Stratis (17), Markopolous, (36, 62), Tsagalios (50); Goals: Stratis (2/4)

Hibernians Rugby Pitch, Paola
Referee: Ollie Maddock (England)

17 October 2026
16:00 EEST (UTC+03:00)

Greece	68–14	Germany
Tries: Tuliatu (14), Markopolous (19), Linoxylakis (30), Bakis (37, 59), Tsagalios (43, 46, 52), Stratis (50), Chionis (55, 62), Aliu (68); Goals: Stratis (10/12)	1st: 26–10; 2nd: 42–4; Report	Tries: Esser (7, 75), Hoggins (27); Goals: Rau (1/2), Adams (0/1)

Elena Venizelou Stadium, Chania
Referee: Nectarios Tsakalos (Greece)

== Euro D ==
2026 European Championship D
- Number of teams: 3
- Winner: Italy
- Matches played: 3

=== Standings ===
Pos	Team	Pld	W	D	L	PF	PA	PD	Pts	Qualification
1	Italy	2	2	0	0	86	44	+42	4	Promoted to Euro C
2	Czechia	2	1	0	1	106	72	+34	2	
3	Norway	2	0	0	2	32	108	−76	0	

Updated to match(es) played on 24 October 2026. Source:

=== Matches ===
17 October 2026
15:00 CEST (UTC+02:00)

Norway	6–40	Italy
Tries: Silverstone-Utheim (76); Goals: Vagen (1/1)	1st: 0–24; 2nd: 6–16; Report	Tries: Colla (8), Decaro (11, 36), S. Ngeng (30, 73), S. E. Ngeng (55), Brugel (68); Goals: Astolfi (6/7)

Øster Hus Arena, Sandnes
Referee: Carl Hughes (England)

24 October 2026
15:00 CEST (UTC+02:00)

Italy	46–38	Czechia
Tries: Scalabrini (9), S. E. Ngeng (13, 36, 44, 51, 62), Falaniko (34), S. Ngeng (78); Goals: Astolfi (7/8)	1st: 22–20; 2nd: 24–18; Report	Tries: Adamec (15, 28), Chuchlik (29, 47), Novotny (39), Schejbal (67, 71); Goals: Adamec (5/7)

Abbiategrasso Rugby Club, Abbiategrasso
Referee: Misa Vakrandu

31 October 2026
14:00 CET (UTC+01:00)

Czechia	68–26	Norway
Tries: Moravek (4, 34, 75), Spidlen (31, 68), Hudrilik (37, 42), Studecky (50), Adamec (57), Schejbal (60, 62), Poner (65); Goals: Hudrilik (10/12)	1st: 24–16; 2nd: 44–10; Report	Tries: Zuniga (17), Holte (23), Falk (28, 79), Hoeyland (54); Goals: Hoeyland (3/5)

Stadion HZS, Hradec Kralove
Referee: Misa Vakrandu
