= United States women's national rugby league team =

Women's national rugby league team

United States Women’s National Rugby League team
Team information
- Nickname: Hawks
- Governing body: USA Rugby League
- Region: North America
- Head coach: Troy Clarkson
- IRL ranking: 16 (December 31, 2025)

Uniforms
First colours

Team results
- First international
- 2019
- Biggest win
- Jamaica 0 - 78 United States (Kingston, Jamaica; September 23, 2023)
- Biggest defeat
- Canada 42 - 10 United States (Burnaby, Canada; April 16, 2022; Canada 40 - 8 United States (Jacksonville, United States; November 9, 2024)

The United States Women’s National Rugby League team, also known as the Hawks represents the United States in women's rugby league. They are administered by the USA Rugby League.

The team was announced on April 9, 2019 and they intend to bid to play in both the 2021 and the 2025 Rugby League World Cups. In 2019, the USARL announced plans for all national representative teams to be known as Hawks, however, when the women's team played their first international match in April 2022 they were called the Redtails. The name was changed when the USARL Hawks' women's administration committee was formed in May 2022.

== Current squad ==
Squad for match against Scotland on 27 February 2026.

J#	Player name	Position	Club	Debut	M	T	G	Pts
1	Brittany Royes	Fullback, Wing	Roots Rugby	2023	3	5	0	20
22	Sydney Pua	Wing	Los Angeles Roosters	2026	1	0	0	0
3	Mia Blocher	Centre	—	2026	1	0	0	0
4	Brandice Neal	Centre	—	2026	1	0	0	0
5	Josephine Asumang	Wing	Roots Rugby	2026	1	1	0	4
6	Terree Okabe	Stand-off	Los Angeles Roosters	2026	1	0	0	0
7	Tiana Granby	Scrum-half, Hooker	Roots Rugby	2023	2	1	0	4
8	Afi Tone	Prop	—	2026	1	1	0	4
9	Nicole Fisch	Hooker	Tampa Mischief	2022	6	7	1	30
10	Kadie Sanford	Prop, Second-row	Tampa Mischief	2022	7	0	0	0
11	Jeanna Beard	Second-row	San Diego Barracudas	2022	5	0	0	0
12	Sha Marica Scott	Second-row, Prop	—	2023	4	0	0	0
13	Sarah Esther Anderson	Loose forward, Second-row	New York State Queens	2023	5	0	0	0
18	Paris Hart	Prop	Roots Rugby	2023	3	0	0	0
15	Isabel Henderson	interchange	—	2026	1	0	0	0
16	Salataima Mamea	interchange	—	2026	1	0	0	0
17	Maiah Alofaituli	interchange	—	2026	1	0	0	0
–	Taylor White	Fullback	Jacksonville AxeWomen	2022	5	1	0	4

Notes:

- Tallies in the table include the match against Scotland on February 27, 2026.
- Per the match video, tries against Scotland were scored by Brittany Royes (jersey 1), Josephine Asumang (5), and Afi Tone (8).

== Past squads ==
=== 2023 ===
The following players are members of the U.S. squad that participated in the Americas Championships in late September 2023. Most players were selected from rugby union clubs. The teams were coached by Ady Cooney.

Pos.	Player	Club	Debut
Fullback	Taylor White	Jacksonville Axewomen	2022
Wing	Agnes Fuerst	Roots Rugby	2023
Centre	Christine Sargent	Roots Rugby	2023
Centre	Cyndi Campbell	Carolina Storm	2023
Fullback, Wing	Brittany Royes	Roots Rugby	2023
Stand-off	Robyn Oliveri	Tampa Mischief	2022
Scrum-half	Courtney Treco	London Broncos	2023
Prop	Paris Hart	Roots Rugby	2023
Hooker	Tiana Granby	Roots Rugby	2023
Prop	Nicole Snyder	Tampa Mischief	2023
Second-row	Sarah Anderson	Chicago North Shore	2023
Second-row	Kadie Sanford	Chicago North Shore	2022
Scrum-half, Loose forward	Samantha Black-Keels	Tampa Mischief	2022
Hooker	Danielle Pola Walko-Siua	Cleveland	2023
Prop	Sha Marica Scott	Roots Rugby	2023
Prop	Narcisse Jordan	Cleveland	2022
Centre	Marcaya Bailous	Cleveland	2023
Wing	Mariah Blackmore	San Jose Seahawks	2023
Hooker	Nicole Fisch	Chicago North Shore	2022
Second-row	Jeanna Beard	Colorado Gray Wolves	2022
Loose forward	Caitlin Davis	Carolina Storm	2023
Loose forward	Rachael Bradley	Tampa Mischief	2022
Loose forward	Maxine Fonua	San Jose Seahawks	—

==== 2023 Development squad ====
The following players were included in a development squad that played in a "Select" match on Saturday, April 16, 2022, prior to the Test Match.

- Backs: Danielle Walko-Siua, Allison Kurtz, Maxine Fonua, Mona Tupou. Juliana Lima, Alecia Eschenbrenner, Devonna Francis (Captain).
- Forwards: Joanne Absher, Shamarica Scott, Paris Hart, Hayley Wortmann, Terree Okabe (Vice-Captain), Keta Sutton
- Interchange: Bee Blackmon, Ariane Lozac'hmeir, Chyna Hamm
- Coach: Ben Calverley

=== 2025 ===
The following team played against Greece on February 28, 2025.

J#	Player	Position	Club	Debut
1	Taylor White	Fullback	Jacksonville Axewomen	2022
2	Shannon Cross Hustosky	Wing	East Palo Alto Razorbacks	2025
3	Haley Sheldon	Centre	Jacksonville Axewomen	2024
4	Cyndi Campbell	Centre	Tampa Mischief	2023
5	Stacia Thompson	Wing	Tampa Mischief	2025
6	Robyn Oliveri	Stand-off	Tampa Mischief	2022
7	Samantha Black-Keels	Scrum-half	Tampa Mischief	2022
8	Narcisse Jordan	Prop	Tampa Mischief	2022
9	Nicole Fisch	Hooker	Tampa Mischief	2022
10	Kadie Sanford	Prop	Tampa Mischief	2022
11	Jeanna Beard	Second-row	San Diego Barracudas	2022
16	Rachael Bradley	Second-row	Tampa Mischief	2022
13	Sarah Esther Anderson	Loose forward	New York State Queens	2023
14	Ashley Mencke	interchange	New York State Queens	2024
15	Erin Walsh	interchange	LA Mongrel	2025
17	Bee Blackmon	interchange	San Diego Barracudas	2025
20	Lucinda Darvell	interchange	New York State Queens	2025

== Results ==
=== Full Internationals ===
The inaugural matches for the United States national women's rugby league team occurred on Saturday, April 16, 2022. A second team match opened proceedings at Burnaby Lake Regional Park, British Columbia, Canada. This game was followed by a Test Match.

Date	Opponent	Score	Tournament	Venue	Video	Report(s)
April 16, 2022	Canada	10–42	International	Burnaby Lake Rugby Club		
September 23, 2023	Jamaica	78–8	Americas Championships	University of West Indies, Kingston		
September 25, 2023	Canada	4–30	Americas Championships	University of West Indies, Kingston		
November 6, 2024	Jamaica	44–0	2026 World Cup qualification Americas Championships	University of North Florida, Jacksonville		
November 9, 2024	Canada	8–40	2026 World Cup qualification Americas Championships	University of North Florida, Jacksonville		
February 28, 2025	Greece	46–0	International	Silver Bowl Park, Las Vegas		
February 27, 2026	Scotland	14–26	International	(United States) Cougar Stadium (Coronado High School), Henderson, Nevada, USA		

=== Second Team matches ===
Date	Opponent	Score	Tournament	Venue	Ref.
April 16, 2022	Canada	10–26	Selection Match	Burnaby Lake Rugby Club	
