= Jamaica women's national rugby league team =

Team representing Jamaica in international rugby league

Jamaica
Team information
- Nickname: Women Reggae Warriors
- Governing body: Jamaica Rugby League Association
- Region: Americas
- IRL ranking: 22 ▲2 (20 August 2026)

Team results
- First international
- Jamaica 8–80 United States (Kingston, Jamaica; 23 September 2023)
- Biggest defeat
- Jamaica 8–80 United States (Kingston, Jamaica; 23 September 2023)

The Jamaica women's national rugby league team represents Jamaica in women's rugby league.

== History ==
In May 2019, a Jamaica women's team took part in the Americas 9s in Toronto, Canada, where they played against teams representing Canada and Ontario. The Jamaica team was made up of rugby union players many of whom were based in the local area.

In February 2020, the fixtures were announced for the Americas Rugby League Championship scheduled to be played in Jamaica that November. The tournament, which was cancelled due to the COVID-19 pandemic, would have seen the Jamaica and United States women's teams play each other in their first official matches. In July 2022, International Rugby League announced details of the qualifying process for the 2025 Rugby League World Cup: For the Americas region, the women's qualifying tournament was to take place in 2024 with Jamaica competing against Chile and the United States. However, the cancellation of the 2025 World Cup led to the qualification tournament also being abandoned.

In May 2023, at the Naples 9s tournament in Florida, United States, the team and the Jamaica Hurricanes (men's 'A' team) both won their competitions with the women defeating defending champions New York Roots Rugby 10–0 in the final.

In September 2023, Jamaica hosted the inaugural Women's Americas North Championship. On 23 September, the team played their first full international losing 80–8 against the United States. In their second match, Jamaica lost 64–2 to Canada who won the tournament. In December 2023, the qualifying process for the 2026 World Cup was announced with the Americas regional competition taking place in November 2024. On 6 November, Jamaica were eliminated from qualifying after losing 44–0 in their match against the United States, but went on to defeat the USA Pioneers 48–12 three days later.

In June 2025, a tri-series tournament between Jamaica, Scotland and the England Community Lions was announced to take place in October and November 2025. This was followed by the announcement of a men's and women's double-header against United States to be played in December. However, the matches against the United States were cancelled due to impacts of Hurricane Melissa in Jamaica.

== Squad ==
Squad selected for 2026 World Cup qualification matches in November 2024:

Player	Club
Veronica Blair	North Bay
Moesha Bogle	Duhaney Park Red Sharks
Chevelle Clarke	York Valkyrie
Dejonaye Cole	St Bess Sledge Hammers
Kamoya Forrest	Tampa Mischief
Shoya Gordon	Jamaica Defence Force
Sherine Johnson	Duhaney Park Red Sharks
Kaya-Jo Laing	Featherstone Rovers
Makeda Lewis	Old Albanians
Mackayla McCalla	Jamaica Defence Force
Gianna Noble-Cunningham	Henley Hawks
Darcey Price	Salford Red Devils
Alicia Richards	Duhaney Park Red Sharks
Tarja Richards	Washington Blvd. Bulls
Elyse Royal	Halifax Panthers
Debisha Scarlett	Washington Blvd. Bulls
Aniya Smith	Jacksonville JaxAxe Women
Shanique Smith	Duhaney Park Red Sharks
Shanice Stewart	Duhaney Park Red Sharks

== Results ==
Date	Score (Note: Jamaica score given first)	Opponent	Competition	Venue	Report
23 September 2023	8–80	United States	Americas Championships	University of West Indies, Kingston	
27 September 2023	2–64	Canada	Americas Championships	University of West Indies, Kingston	
6 November 2024	0–44	United States	2026 World Cup qualification	University of North Florida, Jacksonville	
9 November 2024	48–12	USA Pioneers	Friendly	University of North Florida, Jacksonville	
25 October 2025	6–38	England Community Lions	Friendly	Pilkington Recs, St Helens	
1 November 2025	12–38	Scotland	International	Featherstone Lions, Featherstone	
17 October 2026	20–6	Greece	International	Chania, Crete	

== See also ==
- Jamaica national rugby league team - Men's team
