= England women's national rugby league team =

Team representing England in Women's Rugby League

England Lionesses
Team information
- Nickname: England Lionesses
- Governing body: Rugby Football League
- Region: Europe
- Head coach: Stuart Barrow
- Captain: Jodie Cunningham
- Most caps: Jodie Cunningham 37
- Top try-scorer: Amy Hardcastle 30
- Top point-scorer: Tara-Jane Stanley 218
- IRL ranking: 3 (20 August 2026)

Uniforms
First colours

Team results
- First international
- England 16–2 France (7 July 2007)
- Biggest win
- England 82–0 Wales (2 November 2024)
- Biggest defeat
- England 4–90 Australia (1 March 2025)
- World Cup
- Appearances: 4 (first time in 2008)
- Best result: Semi-Final: 2008, 2013, 2017, 2021

The England women's national rugby league team represents England in women's rugby league. They are administered by the Rugby Football League.

== History ==
=== Early years ===
Women's rugby league was established in 1985 through the Women's Amateur Rugby League Association, with the Great Britain national team playing for the first time in 1996.

From 2007 onwards, England has competed on the international stage, playing in the 2008, 2013, 2017, 2021 and 2026 Women's Rugby League World Cups.

=== 2008 World Cup ===
The 2008 Women's Rugby League World Cup was the third staging of the tournament and the first time England had competed as a nation. The tournament was held in Australia from 26 October and England were in a pool with Russia, France and Australia.

England beat France and Russia in the group stages, losing to Australia, to finish second in the group and qualify for the semi-finals. England were beaten by eventual winners New Zealand at the semi-final stage, as they beat Australia 34–0. England beat the Pacific Islands in the third-placed play-off match.

=== 2013 World Cup ===
The 2013 Women's Rugby League World Cup was held in Great Britain from 26 October and featured Australia, England, France and New Zealand. England's 24-player squad featured players from Bradford, Coventry, Crosfields, Featherstone, Normanton and Thatto Heath.

In the Round Robin format, England suffered a 14–6 defeat to Australia at the Tetley's Stadium, Dewsbury, on Friday, 5 July, before going down 34–16 to New Zealand on Monday, 8 July at Featherstone Rovers’ Post Office Road.

A 42–4 win over France followed in the final round on 11 July at the Fox's Biscuits Stadium, Batley, before a record 54–0 win over France in the third-place play-off at the South Leeds Stadium, Hunslet.

=== 2017 World Cup ===
The 2017 Women's Rugby League World Cup was the fifth staging of the competition, held in Australia between 16 November and 2 December. England took part alongside Australia, Canada, Cook Islands, New Zealand and Papua New Guinea and all group matches were played at the Southern Cross Group Stadium, home of Cronulla Sharks.

England were placed in Group A alongside Australia and the Cook Islands and took on Papua New Guinea in an inter-group match. Their first 2017 Women's Rugby League World Cup match resulted in a 38–0 defeat to Australia on 19 November, before a shock 22–16 defeat to the Cook Islands on 22 November. England were 16–0 down at half time, but Emma Slowe, Amy Hardcastle and Kayleigh Bulman scored for England in the second half, Claire Garner kicking two goals, to make it 16-all, before a late Cook Islands try. England secured their progress to the semi-finals on points difference from the Cooks thanks to a 36–8 win over Papua New Guinea on 16 November. Tries from Charlotte Booth (2), Shona Hoyle, Amy Hardcastle, Tara-Jane Stanley, who kicked four goals, Danielle Bound and Beth Sutcliffe were enough to secure the win.

The semi-final saw England beaten 52–4 by New Zealand on 26 November at Southern Cross Group Stadium, despite a first-half Tara-Jane Stanley try.

Australia would go on to win the final 23–16 on 2 December at Suncorp Stadium, Brisbane.

=== 2021 World Cup ===
The 2021 Women's Rugby League World Cup, played in 2022, took place in England, alongside the Men's and Wheelchair tournaments. England were part of Group A and won their first match against Brazil 72–4, on 1 November 2022. England would go on to win Group A, after defeating Canada 54–4, and Papua New Guinea 42–4.

England would go on to lose in the Semi Finals to New Zealand 6–20 at the York Community Stadium on 14 November 2022. New Zealand lost to the Australian Jillaroos at Old Trafford, 54–4.

=== 2026 World Cup ===
Games preparing for the 2026 World Cup saw a new selection process implemented. Regional training occurred in Lancashire and Yorkshire with head coach, Stuart Barrow, selecting Lancashire and Yorkshire squads before playing an Origin fixture. Performances in these training sessions and match would determine national squad selection.

== Coaches ==
=== Head coach ===
As of 30 October 2026

Name	Tests						Ref.
Name	Span	Matches	W	D	L	W%	Ref.
Joe Warburton	2007	1	1	0	0	100.00%	
Brenda Dobek	2008–10	11	7	0	4	63.64%	
Anthony Sullivan	2011	2	2	0	0	100.00%	
Steve McCormack	2012	1	1	0	0	100.00%	
Chris Chapman	2013–2017	13	7	1	5	57.69%	
Craig Richards	2018–22	11	9	0	2	81.82%	
Stuart Barrow	2023–present	10	7	0	3	70.00%	

==== Nines matches ====
Name	Nines						Ref.
Name	Span	Matches	W	D	L	W%	Ref.
Craig Richards	2019	3	1	0	2	33.33%	

== Players ==
The squad for the 2026 Women's Rugby League World Cup was announced on 28 September 2026. Jodie Cunningham was named captain.

Jersey numbers in the table reflect the team selection for the Round 3 match against Samoa.

Players' ages are as at the date that the table was last updated, 31 October 2026.

J#	Player	Age	Position	Club	Profile	Debut	Caps	T	G	Pts
1	Fran Goldthorp	23	Fullback, Wing	North Queensland Cowboys	Yes	2021	11	7	0	28
2	Anna Davies	31	Wing	Wigan Warriors	Yes	2024	8	12	0	48
3	Georgia Wilson	29	Centre, Fullback	Wigan Warriors	Yes	2019	8	4	0	16
4	Connie Boyd	20	Centre	Leeds Rhinos	Yes	2026	3	3	0	12
20	Evie Cousins	21	Wing, Centre	Leeds Rhinos	Yes	2026	2	1	0	4
6	Isabel Rowe	19	Stand-off, Scrum-half	Wigan Warriors	Yes	2024	7	3	38	88
7	Georgia Roche	26	Scrum-half, Stand-off	Newcastle Knights	Yes	2018	16	8	0	32
8	Mary Coleman	28	Prop	Wigan Warriors	Yes	2026	3	0	0	0
9	Keara Bennett	24	Hooker	Leeds Rhinos	Yes	2022	13	1	0	4
10	Olivia Wood	25	Prop, Second-row	York Valkyrie	Yes	2022	13	2	0	8
11	Lucy Murray	23	Second-row	Leeds Rhinos	Yes	2025	4	3	0	12
12	Hollie-Mae Dodd	23	Second-row, Prop	Canberra Raiders	Yes	2021	14	9	0	36
13	Megan Williams	21	Lock	Wigan Warriors	Yes	2026	4	0	0	0
14	Jodie Cunningham	34	Loose forward	St Helens	Yes	2009	38	10	0	40
15	Victoria Whitfield	30	Prop	St Helens	Yes	2018	17	1	0	4
16	Hope Millard	21	Loose forward, Prop	Canterbury-Bankstown Bulldogs	Yes	2026	2	0	0	0
17	Lucie Sams	20	Prop, Second-row	Wigan Warriors	Yes	2026	2	0	0	0
18	Jenna Foubister	19	Stand-off	Wigan Warriors	Yes	2025	4	2	0	8
19	Ruby Bruce	19	Hooker	Leeds Rhinos	Yes	2025	2	0	0	0
5	Amelia Brown	22	Wing, Fullback	Huddersfield Giants	Yes	2024	3	5	0	20
21	Molly Jones	22	Centre	Wigan Warriors	Yes	2025	2	1	0	4
IJ	Jasmin Strange	23	Second-row	Sydney Roosters	Yes	2026	1	1	0	4
IJ	Eva Hunter	21	Second-row	Wigan Warriors	Yes	2025	4	3	0	12

== Competitive record ==
=== Head-to-head records ===
Opponent	FM	MR	M	W	D	L	Win%	PF	PA	Share
Australia	2008	2025	5	0	0	5	0.00%	14	242	5.47%
Brazil	2022	2022	1	1	0	0	100.00%	72	4	94.74%
Canada	2022	2022	1	1	0	0	100.00%	54	4	93.10%
Cook Islands	2017	2017	1	0	0	1	0.00%	16	22	42.11%
France	2007	2026	22	21	1	0	97.73%	844	122	87.37%
New Zealand	2008	2022	6	0	0	6	0.00%	42	204	17.07%
Pacific Islands	2008	2008	1	1	0	0	100.00%	24	0	100.00%
Papua New Guinea	2017	2022	4	3	0	1	75.00%	118	42	73.75%
Russia	2008	2008	1	1	0	0	100.00%	72	0	100.00%
Samoa	2026	2026	1	0	0	1	100.00%	6	24	20.00%
Wales	2021	2026	6	6	0	0	100.00%	366	12	96.83%
Total	2007	2026	49	34	1	14	69.39%	1,628	676	70.66%

Notes:

- Table last updated 30 October 2026 (after the World Cup match against Samoa)
- Share is the portion of "For" points compared to the sum of "For" and "Against" points.

=== Results ===
==== Full internationals ====
Date	Opponent	Score	Tournament	Venue	Video	Report(s)
7 Jul 2007	France	16–2	Test Match	Stade Municipal de Lescure d'Albigeois, Albi	—	
13 Jul 2008	France	42–4	Test Match	Widnes RUFC	—	
6 Nov 2008	Russia	72–0	2008 Women's Rugby League World Cup	Stockland Park, Sunshine Coast	—	
8 Nov 2008	France	54–4	2008 Women's Rugby League World Cup	Stockland Park, Sunshine Coast	—	
10 Nov 2008	Australia	4–22	2008 Women's Rugby League World Cup	Stockland Park, Sunshine Coast	—	
12 Nov 2008	New Zealand	4–16	2008 Women's Rugby League World Cup	Stockland Park, Sunshine Coast		
14 Nov 2008	Pacific Islands	24–0	2008 Women's Rugby League World Cup	Stockland Park, Sunshine Coast	—	
18 Jul 2009	France	28–8	2 Test Series	Stade Ernest Argeles, Toulouse	—	
25 Jul 2009	France	36–0	2 Test Series	Stade Ernest Argeles, Toulouse	—	
10 Jul 2010	France	40–8	Test Match	National Sports Centre, Lilleshall	—	
10 Nov 2010	New Zealand	6–44	Test Match	Toll Stadium, Whangārei	—	
16 Nov 2010	New Zealand	6–38	Test Match	Waitakere Stadium, Auckland	—	
2 Jul 2011	France	40–6	2 Test Series	Parc Des Sports, Avignon	—	
6 Jul 2011	France	56–6	2 Test Series	Parc Des Sports, Avignon	—	
15 Jun 2012	France	48–0	Test Match	Grattan Stadium, Bradford	—	
5 Jul 2013	Australia	6–14	2013 Women's Rugby League World Cup	The Tetley's Stadium, Dewsbury		
8 Jul 2013	New Zealand	16–34	2013 Women's Rugby League World Cup	Post Office Road, Featherstone		
11 Jul 2013	France	42–4	2013 Women's Rugby League World Cup	Fox's Biscuits Stadium, Batley		
13 Jul 2013	France	54–0	2013 Women's Rugby League World Cup	South Leeds Stadium, Hunslet		
17 Jun 2015	France	24–4	2 Test Series	Stade Jean Benege, Tonneins		
20 Jun 2015	France	14–14	2 Test Series	Stade Roger Garnung, Biganos		
22 Oct 2016	France	36–6	Test Match	Parc des Sports, Avignon	—	
21 Jun 2017	France	26–16	2 Test Series	Stade de la Mer, Perpignan	—	
24 Jun 2017	France	14–8	2 Test Series	Stade de la Mer, Perpignan	—	
16 Nov 2017	Papua New Guinea	36–8	2017 Women's Rugby League World Cup	Southern Cross Group Stadium, Sydney		
19 Nov 2017	Australia	0–38	2017 Women's Rugby League World Cup	Southern Cross Group Stadium, Sydney		
22 Nov 2017	Cook Islands	16–22	2017 Women's Rugby League World Cup	Southern Cross Group Stadium, Sydney		
26 Nov 2017	New Zealand	4–52	2017 Women's Rugby League World Cup	Southern Cross Group Stadium, Sydney		
27 Oct 2018	France	54–4	Test Match	Stade Albert Domec, Carcassonne	—	
9 Nov 2019	Papua New Guinea	24–10	2 Test Series	Goroka		
16 Nov 2019	Papua New Guinea	16–20	2 Test Series	Port Moresby		
25 Jun 2021	Wales	60–0	Test Match	Halliwell Jones Stadium, Warrington		
23 Oct 2021	France	40–4	Test Match	Stade Gilbert Brutus, Perpignan		
12 Jun 2022	Wales	32–6	Test Match	Pandy Park, Crosskeys		
18 Jun 2022	France	36–10	Test Match	Halliwell Jones Stadium, Warrington		
1 Nov 2022	Brazil	72–4	2021 Women's Rugby League World Cup	Headingley Stadium, Leeds		
5 Nov 2022	Canada	54–4	2021 Women's Rugby League World Cup	DW Stadium, Wigan		
9 Nov 2022	Papua New Guinea	42–4	2021 Women's Rugby League World Cup	Headingley Stadium, Leeds		
14 Nov 2022	New Zealand	6–20	2021 Women's Rugby League World Cup	York Community Stadium, York	—	
29 Apr 2023	France	64–0	Test Match	Halliwell Jones Stadium, Warrington		
4 Nov 2023	Wales	60–0	Test Match	Headingley Stadium, Leeds		
29 Jun 2024	France	42–0	Test Match	Stade Ernest-Wallon, Toulouse		
2 Nov 2024	Wales	82–0	Test Match	Headingley Stadium, Leeds	—	
1 Mar 2025	Australia	4–90	Test Match (Rugby League Las Vegas)	Allegiant Stadium, Las Vegas		
9 Aug 2025	Wales	62–0	Test Match	The Gnoll, Neath		
25 Jul 2026	France	38–4	Test Match	Stade Ernest-Wallon, Toulouse		
17 Oct 2026	Wales	70–6	2026 Women's Rugby League World Cup	HBF Park, Perth		
24 Oct 2026	Australia	0–78	2026 Women's Rugby League World Cup	HBF Park, Perth		
30 Oct 2026	Samoa	6–24	2026 Women's Rugby League World Cup	WIN Stadium, Wollongong		

==== Nines matches ====
Date	Opponent	Score	Tournament	Venue	Video	Report(s)
18 Oct 2019	Papua New Guinea	25–4	2019 World Cup	Bankwest Stadium, Parramatta		
19 Oct 2019	Australia	4–42	2019 World Cup	Bankwest Stadium, Parramatta		
19 Oct 2019	New Zealand	4–33	2019 World Cup	Bankwest Stadium, Parramatta		

== IRL Rankings ==
IRL Women's World Rankings
Official rankings as of August 2026
Rank	Change	Team	Pts %
1	Steady	Australia	100
2	Steady	New Zealand	64
3	Steady	England	40
4	Steady	France	25
5	Steady	Samoa	22
6	Steady	Papua New Guinea	19
7	▲6	Canada	19
8	Steady	Ireland	18
9	▼2	Wales	17
10	Steady	Nigeria	16
11	▼2	Cook Islands	15
12	Steady	Fiji	13
13	▲2	Tonga	12
14	▲2	United States	12
15	▼4	Greece	11
16	▼2	Netherlands	10
17	▲3	Scotland	8
18	▼1	Serbia	4
19	▼1	Kenya	4
20	▼1	Ghana	4
21	▲2	Brazil	3
22	▲2	Jamaica	3
23	▼2	Italy	2
24	▼2	Philippines	2
25	▲1	Lebanon	2
26	▼1	Uganda	1
27	Steady	Malta	1
28	Steady	Turkey	1
Complete rankings at www.internationalrugbyleague.com

== Records ==
=== World Cup ===
World Cup Record
Year	Round	Position	Pld	Win	Draw	Loss
(England) 2000	Competed as Great Britain and Ireland					
(New Zealand) 2003	Competed as Great Britain					
(Australia) 2008	Third place	3rd out of 8	5	3	0	2
(England) 2013	Third place	3rd out of 4	4	2	0	2
(Australia) 2017	Semi final	3rd out of 6	4	1	0	3
(England) 2021	Semi final	3rd out of 8	4	3	0	1
(Australia) (Papua New Guinea) (New Zealand) 2026	Group stage	tbc	3	1	0	2

=== World Cup appearances ===
#	Name	World Cups	Matches	Tries	Position
1	Emma Slowe	2008, 2013, 2017	13	2	Prop
1	Emily Rudge	2008, 2013, 2017, 2021	13	0	Scrum-half, Loose forward, Second-row
3	Andrea Dobson	2008, 2013, 2017	12	0	Prop, Loose forward
4	Kirsty Moroney	2008, 2013, 2017	11	2	Scrum-half, Stand-off
4	Beth Sutcliffe	2008, 2013, 2017	11	3	Second-row, Loose forward, Prop
4	Amy Hardcastle	2013, 2017, 2021	11	11	Centre
7	Jodie Cunningham	2013, 2017, 2021	10	2	Wing, Fullback, Loose forward

Source: England Women (World Cup) at Rugby League Record Keepers Club

=== Individual ===
Most appearances
#	Name	Career	Caps	Tries	Position
1	Jodie Cunningham	2009—present	35	10	Centre, Wing, Fullback, Five-eighth, Loose forward
2	Emily Rudge	2008—present	32	17	Scrum-half, Loose forward, Second-row
3	Amy Hardcastle	2009—present	29	30	Fullback, Wing, Centre
4	Andrea Dobson	2007—2017	24	0 (Note: Tallied. The tally excludes 2007 and 2008 matches for which some or all try-scorers are unknown.)	Loose forward, Prop
4	Emma Slowe	2007—2017	24	3	Prop
6	Shona Hoyle	2016—present	22	5	Prop, Second-row
7	Tara-Jane Stanley	2012—present	21	17	Fullback, Wing, Centre
8	Beth Sutcliffe	2007—2017	20	4	Second-row, Loose forward, Prop
9	Kirsty Moroney	2008—2017	19	6 (Note: Tallied. The tally excludes 2008 matches for which some or all try-scorers are unknown.)	Scrum-half, Stand-off

- Most tries: Amy Hardcastle - 30, Tara-Jane Stanley - 17, Emily Rudge - 17, Joanne Watmore - 13, Natalie Gilmour MBE - 13, Jodie Cunningham - 10, Leah Burke - 10.
- Most tries in a match: Anna Davies - 5 vs Wales, at Headingley, 2 November 2024.
- Most points: Tara-Jane Stanley 218, Natalie Gilmour - (at least) 114, Amy Hardcastle 120.

=== Team ===
==== Margins and streaks ====
Biggest winning margins

Margin	Score	Opponent	Venue	Date
82	82–0	Wales	Headingley Stadium	2 Nov 2024
72	72–0	Russia	Sunshine Coast Stadium	8 Nov 2008
68	72–4	Brazil	Headingley Stadium	1 Nov 2022
64	64–0	France	Halliwell Jones Stadium	29 Apr 2023
62	62–0	Wales	The Gnoll	9 Aug 2025
60	60–0	Wales	Halliwell Jones Stadium	25 Jun 2021
54	54–0	France	Hunslet	13 July 2013
50	54–4	France	Sunshine Coast Stadium	8 Nov 2008
50	54–4	France	Carcassonne	27 Oct 2018
50	54–4	Canada	DW Stadium	5 Nov 2022
50	56–6	France	Parc des Sports	6 July 2011
48	48–0	France	Odsal	15 June 2012

Biggest losing margins

Margin	Score	Opponent	Venue	Date
86	4–90	Australia	Allegiant Stadium	1 Mar 2025
78	0–78	Australia	HBF Park	24 Oct 2026
48	4–52	New Zealand	Southern Cross Group Stadium	26 Nov 2017
38	0–38	Australia	Southern Cross Group Stadium	19 Nov 2017
38	6–44	New Zealand	Toll Stadium	10 Oct 2010
32	6–38	New Zealand	Mount Smart Stadium	10 Oct 2010

Most consecutive wins

Matches	First win	Last win	Days	Ended	Days
7	25 Jun 2021	9 Nov 2022	1 year, 137 days	14 Nov 2022	1 year, 142 days
4	14 Nov 2008	10 Jul 2010	1 year, 238 days	10 Nov 2010	1 year, 361 days
4	29 Apr 2023	2 Nov 2024	1 year, 188 days	1 Mar 2025	1 year, 307 days
4	7 Jul 2007	8 Nov 2008	1 year, 125 days	10 Nov 2008	1 year, 127 days
4	22 Oct 2016	16 Nov 2017	1 year, 25 days	19 Nov 2017	1 year, 28 days

Note: England were undefeated for 8 matches from 11 July 2013 to 16 Nov 2017 (4 years, 128 days), with the winning sequence split by a draw in the fourth of the eight matches, on 20 June 2015.

Most consecutive losses

Matches	First loss	Last loss	Days	Ended	Days
3	19 Nov 2017	26 Nov 2017	7 days	27 Oct 2018	342 days

== Knights ==
On 26 July 2022, a women's knights (England reserve team) team was officially launched. The team is managed by Leeds Rhinos head coach Lois Forsell. The team called up a performance squad to training camps in 2023 and 2024.

In 2019, an England reserve side called "England Lions" played Wales, losing 20–24, while the senior side was on tour against Papua New Guinea.

Date	Opponent	Score	Tournament	Venue	Video	Report(s)
16 Nov 2019 (as England Reserves)	Wales	20–24	Friendly	Pilkington Recs, St Helens		
27 October 2022	Cook Islands	14–26	Friendly	Weetwood Sports Park, Leeds		

== See also ==
- Rugby league in England
- England men's national rugby league team
- England national wheelchair rugby league team
- Great Britain women's national rugby league team
- Rugby Football League
- British Rugby League Hall of Fame
