= Women's rugby league =

Female version of Rugby League

- Highest governing body: International Rugby League
- Nicknames: League, RL, rugby, rugby XIII (used throughout Europe); League, footy, football (used throughout Oceania)

Characteristics
- Contact: Full Contact
- Team members: Thirteen
- Mixed-sex: Single
- Type: Team sport, Outdoor
- Equipment: Rugby ball
- Venue: Rugby league playing field

Women's rugby league is the female-only version of rugby league.

The sport has growing more popular in Australia, France, Great Britain, and New Zealand. These countries regularly compete in the Women's Rugby League World Cup which has been in operation since 2000.

== Governing bodies ==
=== International Rugby League ===
As with men's rugby league, the international game and national governing bodies are overseen by the International Rugby League.

=== National bodies ===
==== Australian Women's Rugby League ====
The Australian Rugby League Commission and National Rugby League are the governing bodies of female rugby league in Australia.

From its establishment in 1993, the Australian Women's Rugby League was the governing body of female rugby league in Australia and other parts of Oceania. It took the association five years to be recognized by the ARL. From 1998, the AWRL was an affiliate of the ARL. The AWRL ran the Australia women's national rugby league team and National Championships. Affiliated to the AWRL were state-level governing organisations in the Queensland Women's Rugby League, New South Wales Women's Rugby League, Canberra Women's Rugby League and the Western Australian Women's Rugby League.

Following the advent of the Australian Rugby League Commission in 2012, the duties of the AWRL were absorbed by the ARLC and NRL.

The main women's competitions in Australia are the National Rugby League Women's Premiership, New South Wales Women's Rugby League and the Queensland Rugby League Women's Premiership.

==== Rugby Football League ====
The Rugby Football League is the governing body of female rugby league in the United Kingdom; although some activity is run by the independent Women's Amateur Rugby League Association established in 1985. With women's rugby becoming increasingly popular, the RFL has taken more control in running women's competitions.

At the beginning of the 2006 season there were between thirty and forty female-only rugby league clubs running in England, not including clubs that have teams of both sexes. The majority of these clubs are located in Lancashire and Yorkshire.

The RFL began control of the female sport in 2013 with the launch of the RFL Women's Rugby League. This became the RFL Women's Super League in 2017 as the top level women's rugby league competition in the United Kingdom.

At international level the Great Britain women's national rugby league team represented the whole of Great Britain; however in 2006 the RFL announced that after the 2007 All Golds Tour the Great Britain team would no longer compete on a regular basis, favouring national teams for the home nations of England, Scotland, and Wales.

==== New Zealand Rugby League ====
Women's rugby league in New Zealand is controlled by the New Zealand Rugby League. The national side is called the Kiwi Ferns. The NZRL Women's National Tournament is a competition for female rugby league teams. Women have been playing rugby in New Zealand since the 19th century.

== International ==
The following list of nations that compete, or have competed, internationally in women's rugby league.
Table last updated: 9 November 2026.

Nation	Moniker	Rank	Venues			Mat	Record					Debut				Last
Nation	Moniker	Rank	H	A	N	Mat	W	D	L	PF	PA	O	Year	Opp	Ref	Last
Argentina		NR	0	1	0	1	0	0	1	0	48	19	2018	BRA		2018
Australia	Jillaroos	1	38	20	13	71	46	0	25	2241	907	1	1995	NZL		2026
Brazil	Amazonas	23	1	1	2	4	1	0	3	68	164	19	2018	ARG		2022
Canada	Ravens	11	3	9	6	18	11	0	7	396	408	17	2017	NZL		2026
Cook Islands	Moana	9	0	6	11	17	6	1	10	268	578	6	2003	NZL		2026
England	Lionessess	3	16	23	10	49	34	1	14	1628	666	11	2007	FRA		2026
Fiji	Bulikula	10	3	3	6	12	6	0	6	300	230	4	1998	AUS		2026
France	Les Bleues	4	19	13	10	42	9	1	32	616	1506	11	2007	ENG		2026
Ghana		21	2	4	0	6	0	0	6	46	190	30	2023	NGR		2025
Great Britain	Lionessess	NR	4	10	4	18	7	1	10	245	338	3	1996	AUS		2003
Greece		13	5	6	1	12	4	0	8	92	308	23	2019	TUR		2026
Ireland		8	3	6	2	11	6	0	5	188	212	25	2021	WAL		2025
Italy		20	4	4	1	9	3	0	6	136	274	15	2017	LBN		2024
Jamaica		25	2	2	1	5	1	0	4	46	230	29	2023	USA		2026
Kenya		18	3	2	0	5	3	0	2	106	51	33	2023	UGA		2024
Lebanon	Junipers	27	1	0	2	3	2	0	1	62	60	15	2017	ITA		2026
Malta	Dames	28	0	0	3	3	1	0	2	16	68	27	2022	PHI		2026
Netherlands	Lionessess	15	4	3	0	7	3	0	4	128	166	32	2023	GRE		2026
New Zealand	Kiwi Ferns	2	28	22	20	70	55	0	15	2292	721	1	1995	AUS		2026
NZ Māori	Wahine Toa	NR	7	5	1	13	6	0	7	238	274	5	2002	NZL		2017
Nigeria	Green Falcons	12	4	5	2	11	8	0	3	234	168	30	2023	GHA		2026
Niue		NR	0	1	5	6	1	1	4	62	220	8	2003	NZM		2020
Pacific Islands		NR	0	1	4	5	2	0	3	76	164	13	2008	NZL		2008
Papua New Guinea	Orchids	6	8	2	9	19	5	0	14	280	634	17	2017	ENG		2026
Philippines	Sampaguitas	22	0	0	3	3	2	0	1	80	6	27	2022	MLT		2026
Russia		NR	0	1	4	5	2	0	3	50	220	13	2008	ENG		2008
Samoa	Fetu Samoa	5	1	5	18	24	12	0	12	526	580	6	2003	GBR		2026
Scotland		19	1	3	1	5	3	0	2	134	78	35	2025	WAL		2026
Serbia		17	5	5	0	10	1	0	9	56	378	22	2019	ITA		2024
Tokelau		NR	0	1	5	6	2	0	4	96	162	8	2003	COK		2003
Tonga		14	0	3	14	17	3	1	13	274	538	8	2003	SAM		2026
Turkey		26	4	1	0	5	2	0	3	82	104	21	2019	FRA		2022
Uganda		24	2	1	0	3	1	0	2	29	84	33	2023	KEN		2024
United States	Hawks	16	4	2	1	7	3	0	4	204	146	26	2022	CAN		2026
Wales		7	7	7	2	16	5	0	11	244	652	24	2021	ENG		2026

Notes:

- In the Venues columns H: Home, A: Away, N: Neutral.
- A Great Britain women's rugby league team toured France in 1989 but played only touch football games against French women. They did play a tackle match against a men's Under 21 team, losing 4–10.
- The 2000 World Cup programme lists previous Test series occurring between 1995 and 1999.
- An article previewing the 2007 match between England and France mentions that it was the first international to be played by an English or Great Britain side since the 2003 World Cup.
- Jamaica played in a Nines tournament in 2019 (with Canada and Ontario teams), prior to making their full international debut in 2023.
- Solomon Islands played in Nines tournaments at two Pacific Games, in 2019 and 2023.
- Vanuatu played in the Nines tournament at the 2023 Pacific Games.
- Singapore (Sunbirds) played and won a Nines match in and against Vanuatu in June 2026.

=== Women's Rugby League World Cup ===
The Women's Rugby League World Cup was first held in Great Britain during 2000 to coincide with the men's Rugby League World Cup. Australia, Great Britain and eventual winners New Zealand took part. New Zealand also won the second and third World Cups: a nine team tournament held at North Harbour Stadium, in the Auckland suburb of Albany in 2003; and an eight team tournament held at the Sunshine Coast Stadium and, for the final, Suncorp Stadium in 2008.

In the 2013 World Cup, the Australian Jillaroos won the cup, breaking New Zealand's 13 year winning streak. Australia again beat New Zealand in the 2017 World Cup Final.

The World Cup is played every 4 years. Delayed by a year due to the COVID-19 pandemic, the most recent World Cup included eight teams and was held in November 2022 in England. It was played alongside Men's and Wheelchair tournaments. Australia won the tournament for the third time, all three in succession.

== Domestic competitions ==
=== Australia ===
The NRL Women's Premiership is the top tier national competition. In the second tier are two state competitions in New South Wales and Queensland. There are tackle competitions at a local level in several areas of Sydney and Brisbane, and in regional areas of New South Wales, Queensland and the Australian Capital Territory.
There are also competitions in the capital cites of the Northern Territory, South Australia, Victoria and Western Australia and these states send teams to the National Championships.

The New South Wales Rugby League has also promoted and supported non-tackle League tag competitions in Sydney and regional areas since the early 2010s.

State of Origin is a state representative series played by Queensland and New South Wales. This annual competition began in 1999 as an Interstate Challenge with selections based on the players' state of residence. In 2018, this changed to Origin. In 2023, the National Rugby League extended what had usually been a single annual match to a two-match series.

=== Great Britain ===
The top tier of rugby league in Great Britain is the RFL Women's Super League which operates a promotion and relegation system with the RFL Women's Championship below it. The Women's Challenge Cup is Great Britain's primary cup competition.

== See also ==
- Women's Rugby World Cup
- Women's rugby union
- Women's sports
