= Women's Rugby League European Championship =

Women's Rugby League World European Championship
- Current season, competition or edition: 2027 Women's Rugby League European Championship
- Sport: Rugby league
- Founded: May 2022; 4 years ago
- No. of teams: TBA
- Region: Europe (ERL)
- Website: Official website

The Women's Rugby League European Championship is an international rugby league football tournament for European national teams first held in 2022.

== History ==
The creation of Women's Rugby League European Championships was announced by the ERL in May 2022 with the inaugural edition taking place between June and October the same year, 87 years after the creation of the men's version of the tournament. The tournament would consist of an A and B league with promotion and relegation between them, as the men's tournament has done since 2020. The inaugural edition however, did not feature an A league as A tier countries were competing is the 2021 Women's Rugby League World Cup delayed to 2022 due to the COVID-19 pandemic. The 2022 B league was divided into two groups, a North and South group, which were won by Wales and Greece respectively.

== Results ==
Year	Euro A Winners	Euro B Winners	
2022	N/A (Note: Did not occur due to Euro A teams competing in the 2021 Women's Rugby League World Cup held in 2022 due to the COVID-19 pandemic)	Wales (North)	Greece (South)

== See also ==
- Men's Rugby League European Championship
- Wheelchair Rugby League European Championship
