= England Lionesses =

England Lionesses may refer to:

- England women's national football team
- England women's national rugby league team
