= 2026 Women's Rugby League World Cup qualification =

The 2026 Women's Rugby League World Cup qualification was announced on 15 December 2023. It featured four confederation qualification tournaments for each of the four International Rugby League confederations (Americas, Asia-Pacific, Europe, and Middle East-Africa).

The winner of the Asia-Pacific tournament directly qualified for the World Cup, while the runner up qualified for the 2025 World Series — the tournament to determine the final World Cup qualification spot. The two group winners of Europe directly qualified for the World Cup, while the playoff winner of the two runners-up qualified for the 2025 World Series. The Confederations of Americas & Middle East-Africa did not feature any direct qualifications, with the respective winners qualifying for the 2025 World Series. The winner of the World Series secured the final qualification spot for the 2026 Women's Rugby League World Cup.

Qualification was open to all full and affiliate member nations who did not receive automatic qualification from their results in the 2021 World Cup.

== Qualified teams ==
Team	Method of qualification	Date of qualification	Total times qualified	Last time qualified	Current consecutive appearances	Previous best performance
England	2021 Group A winners	5 November 2022	4 (Note: Plus two as Great Britain)	2021	4	Semi-finals (2008, 2013, 2017, 2021)
Papua New Guinea	2021 Group A runners-up	5 November 2022	2	2021	2	Semi-finals (2021)
Australia	2021 Group B winners	6 November 2022	6	2021	6	Winners (2013, 2017, 2021)
New Zealand	2021 Group B runners-up	6 November 2022	6	2021	6	Winners (2000, 2003, 2008)
Wales	Europe Group A winners	22 June 2024	1	—N/a	1	First appearance
France	Europe Group B winners	22 June 2024	5	2021	2	Semi-finals (2013)
Samoa	Asia-Pacific winners	2 November 2024	3	2008	1	Fifth-place (2003, 2008)
Fiji	World Series winners	29 October 2025	1	—N/a	1	First appearance

== Confederation tournaments ==
=== Americas ===
Americas qualification was intended to have been a four-way competition between Brazil, Canada, Jamaica and the US, with a semi-finals then final format based on IRL rankings, with the winner progressing to the 2025 World Series.

In June 2024, Brazil withdrew from the tournament due to funding and logistical difficulties.

==== Seeding and group draws ====
The original draw and schedule was announced 30 January 2024 and would have seen Canada play Jamaica and the US play Brazil in the semi-finals.

Team	Ranking
Canada	7th
Brazil	11th
United States	16th
Jamaica	22nd

The revised schedule saw Jamaica play USA in a single semi-final, with the winners playing Canada (who received a bye to the final) for the place in the World Series. Canada played a friendly against the USA Pioneers in lieu of their semi-final match, with Jamaica also facing the Pioneers as a result of losing their semi-final as a curtain-raiser before the final. Canada beat the Pioneers 80–0 and Jamaica beat the Pioneers 48–12.

==== Semi-final ====
6 November 2024
19:00 ET (UTC-05:00)

Jamaica	0–44	United States
	Report	Tries: Fisch (2), A’au, Bailous (3), Black, Treco; Goals: Treco (6/8)

University of North Florida, Jacksonville, United States
Referee: Michael Smaill (New Zealand)

Team details
Jamaica		Position	United States
Name	Number	Position	Number	Name
Chevelle Clarke	1	FB	1	Miranda Barnard
Shanice Stewart	2	WG	2	Marcaya Bailous
Gianna Noble-Cunningham	3	CE	3	Christine Sargent
Makeda Lewis	4	CE	4	Cynthia Campbell
Veronica Blair	5	WG	5	Haley Sheldon
Shanique Smith	6	SO	6	Samantha Black
Aniya Smith	7	SH	7	Courtney Treco
Else Royal	8	PR	8	Narcisse Jordan
Alicia Richards	9	HK	9	Nicole Fisch
Darcey Pryce	10	PF	10	Kadie Sandford
Shoya Gordon	11	SR	11	Rachael Bradley
Kaya-Jo Laing	12	SR	12	Jeanna Beard
Tarja Richards	13	LF	13	Esther Anderson
MacKayla McCalla	14	IN	14	Tiara A'au
Kamoya Forrest	15	IN	15	Ashley Mencke
Debisha Scarlett	16	IN	16	Taylor White
Sherine Johnson	17	IN	17	Robyn Oliveri
Andrew Dixon		Coach		Sean Rutgerson

==== Final ====
9 November 2024
16:00 ET (UTC-05:00)

Canada	40–8	United States
Tries: Crowl (3), Sears, Choboter, Pakulis (2); Goals: Franada (1/2), Sears (3/3), Aberg (2/2)	Report	Tries: Sheldon (2); Goals: Treco (0/2)

University of North Florida, Jacksonville, United States
Referee: Michael Smaill (New Zealand)

Team details
Canada		Position	United States
Name	Number	Position	Number	Name
Lauren Mueller	1	FB	1	Miranda Barnard
Brittany Jones	2	WG	2	Marcya Baylous
Petra Woods	3	CE	3	Cyndi Campbell
Candace Scholten	4	CE	4	Christine Sargent
Andie Girard	5	WG	5	Haley Sheldon
Dani Franada	6	SO	6	Courtney Treco
Ale Lewis	7	SH	7	Samantha Black
Sarah Maguire	8	PR	8	Narcisse Jordan
Caitlin Sears	9	HK	9	Nicole Fisch
Chantelle Crowl	10	PF	10	Kadie Sandford
Gabrielle Hindley	11	SR	11	Rachael Bradley
Maddy Aberg	12	SR	12	Ashley Mencke
Megan Pakulis	13	LF	13	Sara Esther Anderson
Natalie Tam	14	IN	14	Tiara A'au
Rachel Choboter	15	IN	15	Shamarica Scott
Tamisha Toussaint	16	IN	16	Robyn Oliveri
Eleta Mitton	17	IN	17	Taylor White
Mike Castle		Coach		Sean Rutgerson

=== Asia-Pacific ===
The 2024 Women's Pacific Bowl acted as qualification for the World Cup. First place qualified for the World Cup, second place qualified for the 2025 World Series.

==== Seeding and group draws ====
The draw and schedule was announced 30 August 2024.

Team	Ranking
Cook Islands	6th
Tonga	14th
Samoa	24th
Fiji	26th

==== Semi-finals ====
19 October 2024
18:00 FJT (UTC+12:00)

Tonga	16–30	Samoa
Tries: 3 Hanisi 21'; Takapautolo 34'; Tauhalaliku 41'; Goals: 2 Paki 2/3 23', 42'	1st: 10–20; 2nd: 6–10; Report	Tries: 5 Masaga 1', 31'; Lofipo 9'; Patea 28', 54'; Tui 65'; Goals: 3 Piliae-Rasabale 3/6 7 pen', 11', 56'

National Stadium, Suva
Attendance: 3,271
Referee: Todd Smith (Australia)
Senior Review Official: Chris Butler (Australia)
Touch judges: Chris Sutton (Australia)

Team details
Tonga		Position	Samoa
Name	Number	Position	Number	Name
Anaseini Malupo	1	FB	1	Evania Pelite
Maatuleio Fotu-Moala	2	WG	2	Mercedez Taulelei-Siala
Litia Fusi	3	CE	3	Lindsay Tui
Kate Fallon	4	CE	4	Sarina Masaga
Lavinia Tauhalaliku	5	WG	5	Jessica Patea
Emmanita Paki	6	SO/FE	6	Tavarna Papalii
Cassey Tohi-Hiku	7	SH/HB	7	Pauline Piliae-Rasabale
Kalosipani Hopoate	8	PR	8	Annetta Nu'uausala (c)
Jade Fonua	9	HK	9	Destiny Brill
Tegan Dymock	10	PF	10	Laikha Clarke
Manilita Takapautolo	11	SR	11	Monalisa Soliola
Vanessa Foliaki (c)	12	SR	12	Christian Pio
Natasha Penitani	13	LF/LK	13	Sienna Lofipo
Filomina Hanisi	15	IN	14	Jetaya Faifua
Dannii Perese	16	IN	15	Simone Karpani
Paea Uilou	17	IN	17	Pihuka Berryman-Duff
Seli Mailangi	19	IN	18	Evah McEwen
Tatiana Finau	14	RES	16	Jasmine Fogavini
Kelvin Wright		Coach		Jamie Soward

26 October 2024
18:00 FJT (UTC+12:00)

Fiji	18–6	Cook Islands
Tries: 4 Naikore 21', 39', 60'; Holmes 17'; Goals: 1 Naikore 18'; Naitokatoka 0/1; Lutu 0/1	1st: 10–6; 2nd: 8–0; Report	Tries: 1 Matua 9'; Goals: 1 Poko 1/1 10'

National Stadium, Suva
Attendance: 3,216
Referee: Peter Gough (Australia)
Senior Review Official: Wyatt Raymond (Australia)
Touch judges: Drew Oultram (Australia)

Team details
Fiji		Position	Cook Islands
Name	Number	Position	Number	Name
Cassie Staples	1	FB	1	Kiana Takairangi (c)
Vitalina Naikore	4	WG	2	Chantelle Holloway-Samuels
Sienna Laing	3	CE	3	Tyler Birch
Taina Naividi	6	CE	4	Kaiyah Atai
Abigayle Sekitoga	19	WG	5	Kiarah Siauane
Luisa Yaranamua	17	SO/FE	6	Charntay Poko
Losana Lutu	7	SH/HB	7	Lydia Turua-Quedley
Ilisapeci Bari	2	PR	8	Crystal Tamarua
Sereana Naitokatoka	9	HK	9	Chelsea Makira
Aliti Namoce	15	PF	10	April Ngatupuna
Nanise Vakacavu	11	SR	11	Jazmon Tupou-Witchman
Latisha Smythe	12	SR	12	Kerehitina Matua
Talei Holmes (c)	18	LF/LK	13	Anneka Stephens
Anastasia Shum-Cottrell	14	IN	14	Jodeci Joseph
Mere Kilawekana	20	IN	15	Lavinia Kitai
Ema Rainima	21	IN	18	Tahleisha Maeva
Teaghan Hartigan	25	IN	19	Ryvrr-Lee Alo
Asenaca Diranuve	10	RES	21	Chazmin Holloway-Samuels
Josaia Dakuitoga		Coach		Rusty Matua

==== Final ====
2 November 2024
17:35 NZDT (UTC+13:00)

Samoa	16–12	Fiji
Tries: 3 Patea 18'; Nu'uausala 56', 67'; Goals: 2 Piliae-Rasabale 2/3 57', 69'	1st: 4–12; 2nd: 12–0	Tries: 2 Laing 30'; Sekitoga 35'; Goals: 2 Naikore 2/2 32', 35'

Mount Smart Stadium, Auckland
Attendance: TBA
Referee: Belinda Sharpe (Australia)
Senior Review Official: Liam Kennedy (Australia)
Touch judges: Drew Oultram (Australia)

Team details
Samoa		Position	Fiji
Name	Number	Position	Number	Name
Evania Pelite	1	FB	1	Cassie Staples
Mercedez Taulelei-Siala	2	WG	4	Vitalina Naikore
Lindsay Tui	3	CE	3	Sienna Laing
Sarina Masaga	4	CE	6	Taina Naividi
Jessica Patea	5	WG	19	Abigayle Sekitoga
Tavarna Papalii	6	SO/FE	17	Luisa Yaranamua
Pauline Piliae-Rasabale	7	SH/HB	5	Losana Lutu
Annetta Nu'uausala (c)	8	PR	2	Ilisapeci Bari
Destiny Brill	9	HK	9	Sereana Naitokatoka
Evah McEwen	17	PF	12	Latisha Smythe
Monalisa Soliola	11	SR	11	Nanise Vakacavu
Christian Pio	12	SR	25	Teaghan Hartigan
Sienna Lofipo	13	LF/LK	18	Talei Holmes (c)
Laikha Clarke	10	IN	8	Sereana Maragi
Jetaya Faifua	14	IN	14	Anastasia Shum-Cottrell
Simone Karpani	15	IN	20	Mere Kilawekana
Pihuka Berryman-Duff	16	IN	21	Rory Muller
Jasmine Fogavini	16	RES	15	Ema Rainima
Jamie Soward		Coach		Josaia Dakuitoga

=== Europe ===
Seven teams entered into the competition. The two lowest ranked teams, Italy and the Netherlands, played each other in a preliminary play-off match. The resulting six teams were split into two groups of three. The two group winning countries qualified for the World Cup, while the runners up in each group contested a play-off for a spot in the 2025 World Series.

==== Seeding and group draws ====
The draw for the groups was made on 17 January 2024, with fixtures confirmed on 7 February. Teams were seeded in pairs (highest ranked with second ranked, third with fourth and fifth with sixth) based on their IRL ranking on the date of the draw with one team from each pair in each group.

Group A		Group B	
Team	Rank	Team	Rank
Wales	8th	France	5th
Ireland	9th	Greece	10th
Italy/ Netherlands	16th/ 18th	Serbia	12th

==== Preliminary playoff ====
27 April 2024
15:00 CEST (UTC+02:00)

Italy	6–56	Netherlands
Tries: Severgnini; Goals: Antonia (1/1)	1st: 6–20; 2nd: 0–36; Report	Tries: Gevers (3), Geerlings, Van Beukering, Berding, N. Kennedy (3), Blom, Van Diepen; Goals: Berding (4/8), Schouw (0/1), Geerlings (1/1), Van der Zwan (1/1)

Maurizio Quaggia Stadium, Mogliano Veneto
Referee: Nenad Zujic (Serbia)

Team details
Italy		Position	Netherlands
Name	Number	Position	Number	Name
Alessandra Menotti	1	FB	1	Nicole Kennedy
Rwan Hassnien	2	WG	2	Hiermons Monischa
Loide Agosta	3	CE	3	Lisa Berding
Camilla Giacomazzo	4	CE	4	Paige Schouw
Lillian Bremang	5	WG	5	Hannah Van Beukering
Martina Dall' Antonia	6	SO	6	Hiske Blom
Valentina Virgili	7	SH	7	Rixt Aerts
Giulia Iozzi	8	PR	8	Sele Steenkist
Camilla Vio	9	HK	9	Ver Van Der Zwan
Vanessa Bertini	10	PF	10	Lorraine Voorbach
Silvis Gai	11	SR	11	Linneke Gevers
Altea Forto	12	SR	12	Sylvie Moelee
Marvin Severgnini	13	LF	13	Kaylee Geerlings
Alissa Meinero	14	IN	14	Claire Kennedy
Alice Botiaro	15	IN	15	Dominique Velema
Ilenia Bollini	16	IN	16	Dana Burik
Fabiola Tosetii	17	IN	17	Stephanie Van Diepen
Alberto Suin		Coach		Matt Rigby

==== Group stage ====
Group A
Pos	Team	Pld	W	D	L	PF	PA	PD	Pts	Qualification
1	Wales	2	2	0	0	76	16	+60	4	Qualify for 2026 World Cup
2	Ireland	2	1	0	1	26	40	−14	2	Advance to World Series play-off
3	Netherlands	2	0	0	2	18	64	−46	0	

Source: ERL

27 April 2024
14:45 BST (UTC+01:00)

Wales	28–10	Ireland
Tries: Dainton (2), Taylor, Salter, Parker; Goals: Salter (4/5)	1st: 18–4; 2nd: 10–6; Report	Tries: Tutty, Molloy; Goals: Cobain (1/3)

Cardiff University Sports Fields, Cardiff
Attendance: 300
Referee: Sam Jenkinson (England)

Team details
Wales		Position	Ireland
Name	Number	Position	Number	Name
Brittony Price	1	FB	1	Cliodhna O'Sullivan
Georgia Taylor	2	WG	2	Bettie Lambert
Ashlea Prescott	3	CE	3	Molly Young
Kathryn Salter	4	CE	4	Francessca Copley
Lucia Davies	5	WG	5	Grace Tutty
Shaunni Davies	6	SO	6	Holly O'Dwyer
Rhi Parker	7	SH	7	Alex McGuinness
Amy Price	8	PR	8	Mairead Quinn
Jasmine Gibbons	9	HK	9	Niamh Griffin
Sara Jones	10	PF	10	Rachel Morton
Hannah Jones	11	SR	11	Storm Cobain
Charlie Mundy	12	SR	12	Tricia Doyle
Bethan Dainton	13	LF	13	Clodagh Dunne
Agnes Wood	14	IN	14	Megan Preston
Katie Carr	15	IN	15	Caoimhe Molloy
Ffion Jenkins	16	IN	16	lydia Egan
Kim Boaler	17	IN	17	Lisa Callen
Tom Brindle		Coach		Matt Kennerson

19 May 2024
15:00 IST (UTC+01:00)

Ireland	16–12	Netherlands
Tries: Preston, Cobain (2); Goals: Cobain (2/3)	Report	Tries: Van Der Zwan, N. Kennedy, J. Kennedy

Donnybrook Stadium, Dublin
Referee: Fabien Nicaud (France)

Team details
Ireland		Position	Netherlands
Name	Number	Position	Number	Name
Cliodhna O'Sullivan	1	FB	1	Nicole Kennedy
Alice Fitzegerald	2	WG	2	Monischa Hiermons
Francessca Copley	3	CE	3	Claire Kennedy
Mollie Young	4	CE	4	Linneke Gevers
Bettie Lambert	5	WG	5	Hannah Van Beukering
Storm Cobain	6	SO	6	Hiske Blom
Alex McGuinness	7	SH	7	Rixt Aerts
Mairead Quinn	8	PR	8	Sela Steenkist
Megan Preston	9	HK	9	Vera Van Der Zwan
Clodagh Dunne	10	PF	10	Lorraine Voorbach
Lisa Callan	11	SR	11	Jessica Kennedy
Tricia Doyle	12	SR	12	Sylvie Moelee
Caoimhe Molloy	13	LF	13	Lisa Berding
Niamh Griffin	14	IN	14	Paige Schouw
Rachel Morton	15	IN	15	Iris Hansman
Aine Rutley	16	IN	16	Dominique Velema
Stacy Hanley	17	IN	17	Stephanie Van Diepen
		RES	18	Arijanna Van Der Kieft
Matt Jefferson		Coach		Matt Rigby

22 June 2024
16:00 CEST (UTC+02:00)

Netherlands	6–48	Wales
Tries: Moelee; Goals: Geerlings (1/1)	Report	Tries: Burnell (2), Price, Gough-Walters (3), Salter, Wood, H Jones, Dainton; Goals: Salter (2/7), Burnell (2/3)

RC Waterland, Purmerend, Netherlands
Referee: Geoffrey Poumes (France)

Team details
Netherlands		Position	Wales
Name	Number	Position	Number	Name
Nicole Kennedy	1	FB	1	Leanne Burnell
Monischa Hiermons	2	WG	2	Megan Whittaker
Lisa Berding	3	CE	3	Kathryn Salter
Linneke Gevers	4	CE	4	Seren Gough-Walters
Hannah Van Beukering	5	WG	5	Britonny Price
Rixt Aerts	6	SO	6	Rhi Parker
Hiske Blom	7	SH	7	Shaunni Davies
Sela Steenkist	8	PR	8	Amy Price
Ver Van Der Zwan	9	HK	9	Jasmine Gibbons
Lorraine Voorbach	10	PF	10	Sara Jones
Carola Terlouw	11	SR	11	Hannah Jones
Sylvie Moelee	12	SR	12	Georgia Taylor
Kaylee Geerlings	13	LF	13	Bethan Dainton
Dominique Velema	14	IN	14	Agnes Wood
Claire Kennedy	15	IN	15	Katie Carr
Kim Dekker	16	IN	16	Gracie Hobbs
Iris Hansman	17	IN	17	Ffion Jones
Matt Rigby		Coach		Tom Brindle

Group B
Pos	Team	Pld	W	D	L	PF	PA	PD	Pts	Qualification
1	France	2	2	0	0	116	0	+116	4	Qualify for 2026 World Cup
2	Greece	2	1	0	1	32	62	−30	2	Advance to World Series play-off
3	Serbia	2	0	0	2	4	90	−86	0	

Source: ERL

13 April 2024
16:00 CEST (UTC+02:00)

France	58–0	Greece
Tries: Song-Puche, Canal (4), Legout, Vilanove (3), Ramos, Himoudi (2); Goals: Pommier (5/12)	1st: 28–0; 2nd: 30–0; Report

Stade Georges Dartiailh, Marmande
Attendance: 1,112
Referee: James Spencer (Ireland)

Team details
France		Position	Greece
Name	Number	Position	Number	Name
Manon Samarra	1	FB	1	Magdelini Stavrianou
Margot Canal	2	WG	2	Velissaria Koutsioumpa
Cristina Song-Puche	3	CE	3	Dimitra Papoutsi
Amael Vilanove	4	CE	4	Christina Macris
Chahrazad Himoudi	5	WG	5	Sofia Anagnostopoulou
Justine Roses	6	SO	6	Cleopatra Velmachou
Mahault Pommier	7	SH	7	Asimina Mastoraki
Salomé Ségala	8	PR	8	Marianna Chali,
Fanny Ramos	9	HK	9	Chrysi Lymperidi
Leila Bessahli	10	PF	10	Anna Limperi
Ines Legout	11	SR	11	Maria-Eleni Gkirlemi
Stecy Bessiere	12	SR	12	Myrsini Pappa
Dorine Samarra	13	LF	13	Ourania Koutsikou
Helene Leclerc	14	IN	14	Georgia-Fotini Koutsimpogeorgou
Pauline Noe	15	IN	15	Ekaterini Varypati
Nabila Zaghdoudi	16	IN	16	Maria-Anna Lamprou
Tallis Kuresa	17	IN	17	Sofia-Margarita Kitsaneli
Romain Maillot		Coach		Jim Minadakis

18 May 2024
17:00 EEST (UTC+03:00)

Greece	32–4	Serbia
Tries: Papoutsi (2), Lamprou (2), Koutsikou, Koutsimpogeorgou, Koutsioumpa; Goals: Pappa (2/4)	Report	Tries: Simic

Agios Dimitrios Stadium, Athens
Referee: James Jones (Wales)

Team details
Greece		Position	Serbia
Name	Number	Position	Number	Name
Kleopatra Velmachou	1	FB	1	Tamara Bošnjak
Velissaria Koutsioumpa	2	WG	2	Katarina Veljanovski
Dimitra Papoutsi	3	CE	3	Teodora Micic
Christina Macris	4	CE	4	Anastasija Karanovic
Magdelini Stavrianou	5	WG	5	Jelena Stoiljković
Asimina Mastoraki	6	SO	6	Natasa Kovacevic
Sofia-Margarita Kitsaneli	7	SH	7	Lea Milosevic
Maria-Anna Lamprou	8	PR	8	Marija Maslakovic
Chrysi Lymperidi	9	HK	9	Karolina Blizanac
Marie Eleni Gkirlemi	10	PF	10	Anna Liuter
Myrsini Pappa	11	SR	11	Sanja Starcevic
Anna Limperi	12	SR	12	Natalija Simic
Ourania Koutsikou	13	LF	13	Cleopatra Carreno
Sofia Anagnostopoulou	14	IN	14	Jovana Fridl
Marianna Chali	15	IN	15	Uma Cengaj
Georgia-Fotini Koutsimpogeorgou	16	IN	16	Nika Bajic
Sotiria Skouroliakou	17	IN	17	Dunja Stojiljkovic
Jim Minadakis		Coach		Slobodan Manak

22 June 2024
17:00 CEST (UTC+02:00)

Serbia	0–58	France
	Report	Tries: Monsarrat, Song-Puche (3), Kessely (2), Ramazeilles (2), Samarra, Roses; Goals: Diraison (9/10)

Stadium FC Srem Jakovo, Belgrade
Referee: Jarda Bzoch (Czech Republic)

Team details
Serbia		Position	France
Name	Number	Position	Number	Name
Tamara Bosnjak	1	FB	1	Manon Samarra
Teodora Micic	2	WG	2	Chahrazad Himoudi
Sanja Starcevic	3	CE	3	Cristina Song-Puche
Marija Stojsic	4	CE	4	Amael Vilanove
Anastasija Karanovic	5	WG	5	Perle Ramazeilles
Ljiljana Bajic	6	SO	6	Justine Roses
Katarina Veljanovski	7	SH	7	Lisa Diraison
Natalija Simic	8	PR	8	Haoua Kessely
Natasa Kovacevic	9	HK	9	Mahault Pommier
Teodora Marin	10	PF	10	Perrine Monsarrat
Mihaela Markicevic	11	SR	11	Ines Legout
Anna Liuter	12	SR	12	Dorine Samarra
Marija Maslakovic	13	LF	13	Leila Bessahli
Marija Simovic	14	IN	14	Noemie Samuel
Milica Cvijetanovic	15	IN	15	Salome Segala
Nika Bajic	16	IN	16	Pauline Noe
Uma Cengaj	17	IN	17	Tallis Kuresa
Slobodan Manak		Coach		Romain Maillot

==== World Series playoff ====
The IRL World Rankings were updated in July 2024 following the group stage of the European qualification tournament. This saw Greece move up one spot to ninth and Ireland drop one spot to tenth. As a result, Greece hosted the World Series playoff.

12 October 2024
15:00 EEST (UTC+03:00)

Greece	6–42	Ireland
Tries: Lamprou; Goals: Pappa (1/1)	Report	Tries: Doyle, Fitzegerald, Molloy, O'Dwyer, Lambert (2), McGuinness, Tutty; Goals: Cobain (5/8)

Gkorytsa Stadium, Athens
Referee: T. Jones (England)

Team details
Greece		Position	Ireland
Name	Number	Position	Number	Name
Cleopatra Velmachou	1	FB	1	Cliodhna O'Sullivan
Magdelini Stavrianou	2	WG	2	Alice Fitzegerald
Dimitra Papoutsi	3	CE	3	Holly O'Dwyer
Chrysi Lymperidi	4	CE	4	Grace Tutty
Sotiria Skouroliakou	5	WG	5	Bethany Lambert
Asimina Mastoraki	6	SO	6	Jade Walker
Sophia Margarita Kitsaneli	7	SH	7	Alex McGuinness
Ourania Koutsikou	8	PR	8	Clodagh Dunne
Effie Skouroliakou	9	HK	9	Polly Roberts
Maria-Eleni Gkirlemi	10	PF	10	Stacy Hanley
Isaia Maragkou	11	SR	11	Storm Cobain
Anais Dragoumis	12	SR	12	Tricia Doyle
Myrsini Pappa	13	LF	13	Iona McCusker
Sophia Anagnostopoulou	14	IN	14	Anna Potterton
Triantafyllia Vasilogianni	15	IN	15	Orlaith McAuliffe
Maria-Anna Lamprou	16	IN	16	Caoimhe Molloy
Aimilia Kozari	17	IN	17	Mairead Quinn
Jim Minadakis		Coach		Matt Kennerson

=== Middle East-Africa ===
Kenya hosted Nigeria in a two match test series where the winner qualified for the 2025 World Series.

The series saw each team win one match and the aggregate score was 22-all. Under the tournament rules the team with the highest aggregate scores would advance but with the aggregate scores tied, the result had to move to the next deciding criteria. The next deciding criteria was tries scored. Again this was tied with each having scored four. The next deciding criteria was number of goals kicked, which saw Nigeria advance to the World Series with a three to two goal advantage.

19 September 2024
16:00 EAT (UTC+03:00)

Kenya	14–22	Nigeria
Tries: Amazimbi, Negesia (2); Goals: Ochieng (1/3)	report	Tries: Aladegelu, Ukwuoma, Iliya (2); Goals: Aladegelu (3/4)

National Youth Centre Organisation, Nairobi
Referee: Stephane Vincent (France)

Team details
Kenya		Position	Nigeria
Name	Number	Position	Number	Name
Lawnisky Munayi	1	FB	1	Blessing Aladegelu
Moreen Atieno	2	WG	2	Blessing Umude
Lovinah Mijere	3	CE	3	Endurance Ukwuoma
Lewin Amazimbi	4	CE	4	Lauretta Bayere
Merisha Negesia	5	WG	5	Perpetua Nwanya
Diana Omosso	6	SO	6	Rukayat Akinade
Ann Ochieng	7	SH	7	Adaeze Innocent
Mercy Khatenje	8	PR	8	Shukurat Nojimu
Milkah Chitechi	9	HK	9	Rukayat Jimoh
Dorris Kimani	10	PF	10	Chinaza Abbah
Sophye Nabwire	11	SR	11	Muinat Oseni
Kerina Omala	12	SR	12	Abiola Obazuaye
Angel Salamba	13	LF	13	Rachel Iliya
Vivian Anyango	14	IN	14	Becky Okitikpe
Susan Wangechi	15	IN	15	Success Iyoha
Sharon Bosibori	16	IN	16	Elizabeth Adie
Faith Oketch	17	IN	17	Adaolisa Onyedikachi
Antonio Lombardo		Coach		Bolu Fagborun

22 September 2024
16:00 EAT (UTC+03:00)

Kenya	8–0	Nigeria
Tries: Negesia; Goals: Omosso (1/4); Drop goals: Omosso (2)	report

Impala Club Rugby Ground, Nairobi
Referee: Stephane Vincent (France)

Team details
Kenya		Position	Nigeria
Name	Number	Position	Number	Name
Milkah Chitechi	1	FB	1	Blessing Umude
Merisha Negesia	2	WG	2	Becky Okitikpe
Susan Wangechi	3	CE	3	Lauretta Bayere
Lewin Amazimbi	4	CE	4	Success Iyoha
Lawnisky Munayi	5	WG	5	Endurance Ukwuoma
Moreen Atieno	6	SO	6	Blessing Aladegelu
Diana Omosso	7	SH	7	Adaeze Innocent
Angel Salamba	8	PR	8	Shukurat Nojimu
Faith Oketch	9	HK	9	Rukayat Jimoh
Dorris Kimani	10	PF	10	Chinaza Abbah
Kerina Omala	11	SR	11	Oseni Muinat
Dorothy Mulela	12	SR	12	Abiola Obazuaye
Lovinah Mijere	13	LF	13	Rachel Iliya
Vivian Anyango	14	IN	14	Rukayat Akinade
Sharon Bosibori	15	IN	15	Perpetua Nwanna
Sophye Nabwire	16	IN	16	Elizabeth Adie
Hesslah Khisa	17	IN	17	Adaolisa Onyedikachi
Antonio Lombardo		Coach		Bolu Fagborun

== World Series ==
2025 Women's Rugby League World Series
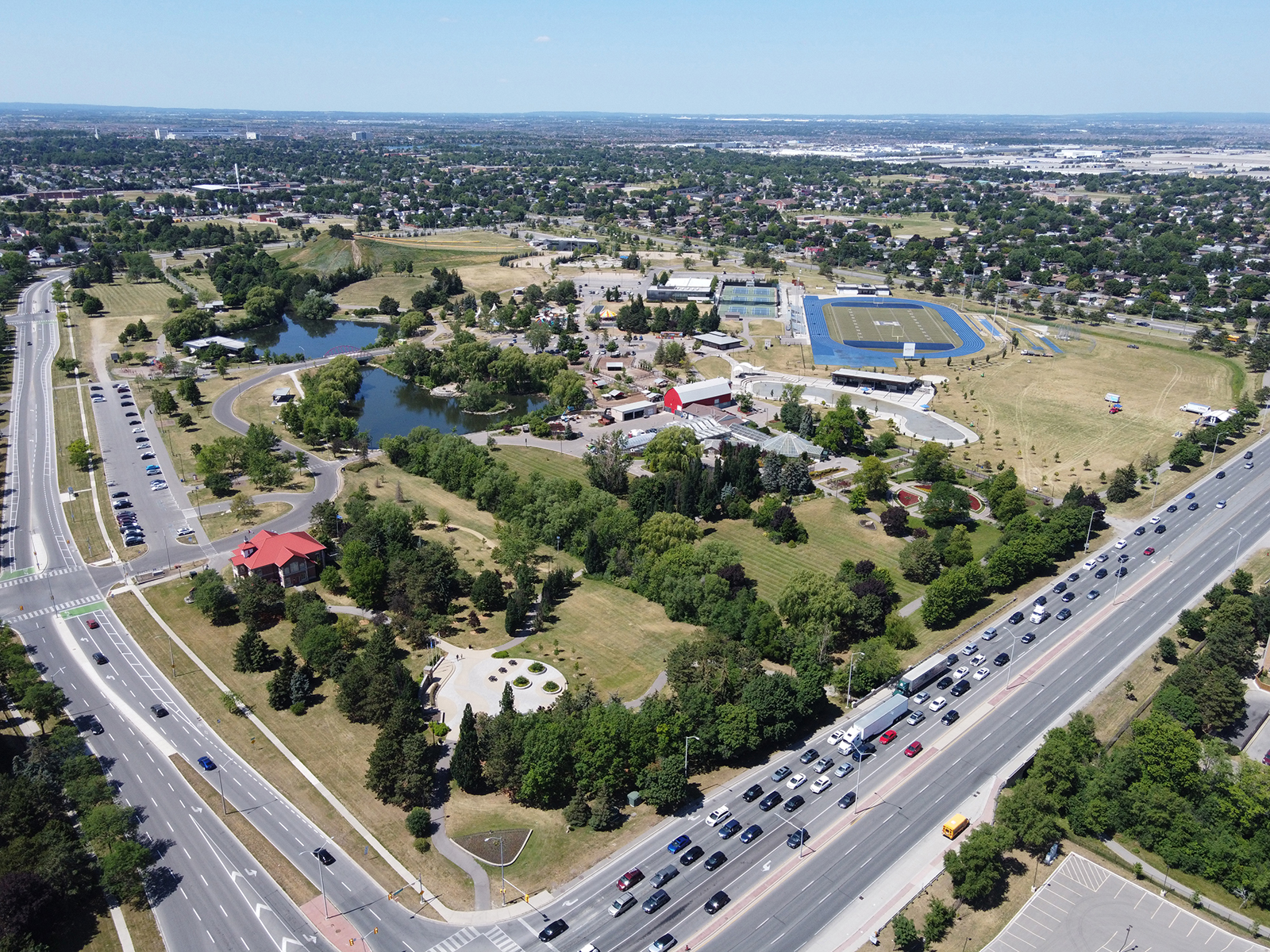
- Donald M. Gordon Chinguacousy Park hosted the event
- Number of teams: 4
- Host country: Canada
- Winner: Fiji
- Matches played: 4

The 2025 Women's Rugby League World Series was the final qualification phase for 2026 Women's Rugby League World Cup.

The series was played by:

- Canada (Americas winner)
- Fiji (Asia-Pacific runner-up)
- Ireland (European group runners-up playoff winner)
- Nigeria (Middle East-Africa winners)

The winner qualified for the World Cup.

In March 2025, when announcing the tournament structure, Canada was also announced as the host nation.

=== Draws ===
IRL Women's World Rankings
Official rankings as of December 2024
Rank	Change	Team	Pts %
7	▲3	Ireland	19
9	▼1	Canada	17
16	▲10	Fiji	8
17	▲1	Nigeria	8

The draw for the competition was based on rank with 1st playing 4th and 2nd playing 3rd in the semi-finals.

=== Squads ===
==== Canada ====
Canada announced an extended 33-woman squad on 10 September. This was reduced to 20 on 14 October.

Head Coach: Matt Barron

Player	Club
Maddy Aberg	(Canada) Alberta Broncos
Jessica Bateman	(Canada) Alberta Broncos
Grace Campbell	(Canada) Alberta Broncos
Alanna Fittes	(Canada) Alberta Broncos
Danielle Franada	(Canada) Alberta Broncos
Brittany Jones (Note: Named in initial squad but not included in final squad)	(Canada) Alberta Broncos
Rebecca Kochuk	(Canada) Alberta Broncos
Ale Lewis	(Canada) Alberta Broncos
Sarah Maguire	(Canada) Alberta Broncos
Elizabeth Steele	(Canada) Alberta Broncos
Renee Gonzalez	(Canada) BC Storm
Gabrielle Hindley	(Canada) BC Storm
Ada Okonkwo	(Canada) BC Storm
Alayna Scramstad	(Canada) BC Storm
Megan Pakulis	(Australia) Gold Coast Titans
Lauren Mueller	(England) London Broncos
Sara Canini	(Canada) Ontario Osprey
Jessica Joubarne	(Canada) Ontario Osprey
Britteny Kassil	(Canada) Ontario Osprey
Eleta Mitton	(Canada) Ontario Osprey
Natasha Naismith	(Canada) Ontario Osprey
Fedelia Omoghan	(Canada) Ontario Osprey
Candace Kelly Scholten	(Canada) Ontario Osprey
Beth Hoffstetter	(Canada) Ontario Osprey
Maddie Hobson	(Canada) Ontario Osprey
Andie Girard	(Canada) Ontario Osprey
Tamisha Toussaint	(Canada) Ontario Osprey
Petra Woods	(Canada) Ontario Osprey
Savanna Bacchus	(New Zealand) Otahuhu Leopards
Rachel Choboter	(New Zealand) Otahuhu Leopards
Chantelle Crowl	(England) St Helens
Caitlin Sears	(New Zealand) Sydneham
Laura Mariu	Free Agent

==== Fiji ====
Fiji announced an extended 25-woman squad on 19 September. This was reduced to 20 on 15 October.

Head Coach: Joe Dakuitoga

Player	Club
Tahila Marshall (Note: Added after initial extended squad announcement)	(Australia) Brisbane Tigers
Teaghan Hartigan	(Australia) Burleigh Bears
Ebony Laing	(Australia) Burleigh Bears
Sienna Laing	(Australia) Burleigh Bears
Sereana Naitokatoka	(Australia) Canberra Raiders
Isabella Waterman	(Australia) Canberra Raiders
Ilisapeci Bari (Note: Named in initial squad but not included in final squad)	(Australia) Canterbury Bulldogs
Latisha Smythe	(Australia) Canterbury Bulldogs
Talei Holmes	(Australia) Cronulla Sharks
Cassie Staples	(Australia) Cronulla Sharks
Tahlia Marshall	(Australia) Easts Tigers
Elizabeth Naleba	(Australia) Ipswich Jets
Tanika Newton	(Australia) Ipswich Jets
Asham Leilani	(Australia) Newcastle Knights
Rory Muller	(Australia) Parramatta Eels
Josiliva Vere Moceinacagi	(Fiji) Police Sharks
Kelilani Manu	(Australia) South Sydney Rabbitohs
Luisa Yaranamu	(Australia) South Sydney Rabbitohs
Maria Paseka	(Australia) St George Illawarra Dragons
Taina Naividi	(Australia) Sydney Roosters
Mere Kilawekana	(Fiji) USP Raiders
Naomi Tegu	(Fiji) USP Raiders
Kinisalote Vusawa	(Fiji) USP Raiders
Joy Levy	(Australia) Wests Tigers
Losana Lutu	(Australia) Wests Tigers
Nunia Kawa	(Fiji) Yasawa Saints

==== Ireland ====
Ireland announced an extended 33-woman squad on 18 September. This was reduced to 20 on 15 October.

Head Coach: Matt Kennerson

Player	Club
Martha Dwyer	(Australia) Aspley Devils
Trisha Doyle	(Australia) Aspley Devils
Katie Ann McCallion	(Ireland) Banbridge Broncos
Rachel Morton (Note: Named in initial squad but not included in final squad)	(Ireland) Banbridge Broncos
Jemma Gallagher	(Australia) Corrimal Cougars
Molly Boyne	(Ireland) Dublin City Exiles
Lisa Callan	(Ireland) Dublin City Exiles
Aimee Clarke	(Ireland) Dublin City Exiles
Alice Fitzgerald	(Ireland) Dublin City Exiles
Niamh Griffin	(Ireland) Dublin City Exiles
Emma Kelly	(Ireland) Dublin City Exiles
Lena Kibler	(Ireland) Dublin City Exiles
Orlaith McAuliffe	(Ireland) Dublin City Exiles
Caoimhe Molloy	(Ireland) Dublin City Exiles
Katie Ann O'Neill	(Ireland) Dublin City Exiles
Cliodhna O'Sullivan	(Ireland) Dublin City Exiles
Anna Potterton	(Ireland) Dublin City Exiles
Aine Rutley	(Ireland) Dublin City Exiles
Roisin Crowe	(Australia) Engadine Dragons
Stacy Hanley	(Ireland) Galway Tribeswomen
Aifric Ni Ghibne	(Ireland) Galway Tribeswomen
Holly O'Dwyer	(Ireland) Galway Tribeswomen
Megan Preston	(England) Huddersfield Giants
Storm Cobain	(England) Leigh Leopards
Molly Young	(England) Leigh Leopards
Iona Mcusker	(England) London Broncos
Polly Roberts	(England) London Broncos
Jade Walker	(England) London Broncos
Stephanie Carroll	(Australia) Mounties
Sarah Madison Boyle	(Australia) Mounties
Lydia Egan	(England) Salford Red Devils
Lily Rogan	(Australia) Wests Tigers
Becky Webb	(England) Widnes Vikings

==== Nigeria ====
Nigeria announced an extended 35-woman squad on 12 September. This was reduced to 20 on 18 October.

Head Coach: Bolu Fagborun

Player	Club
Faustina Akeje (Note: Added after initial extended squad announcement)	(Australia) Canterbury-Bankstown Bulldogs
Chinaza Abbah (Note: Named in initial squad but not included in final squad)	(Nigeria) Eko Trinity
Japhet Akpanwa	(Nigeria) Eko Trinity
Mmesona Ibezilim	(Nigeria) Eko Trinity
Rachel Iliya	(Nigeria) Eko Trinity
Shukurat Nojimu	(Nigeria) Eko Trinity
Cynthia Obi	(Nigeria) Eko Trinity
Endurance Ukwuoma	(Nigeria) Eko Trinity
Blessing Umude	(Nigeria) Eko Trinity
Elizabeth Adie	(Nigeria) Kano Lions
Ruth Odey	(Nigeria) Kano Lions
Rukayat Akinade	(Nigeria) Lagos Bulls
Blessing Aladeyelu	(Nigeria) Lagos Bulls
Lauretta Bayere	(Nigeria) Lagos Bulls
Chukwunekwu Divine	(Nigeria) Lagos Bulls
Adaeze Innocent	(Nigeria) Lagos Bulls
Rukayat Jimoh	(Nigeria) Lagos Bulls
Muinat Osen	(Nigeria) Lagos Bulls
Aminah Oluwabunmi	(England) London Broncos
Danyelle Shobanjo	(England) London Broncos
Catherine Akeje	(Australia) Oran Park Gregory Hills Chargers
Adeola King	(Canada) Ottawa Tigers
Vera Akhihiero	(Nigeria) R2 Finesse Academy
Kafayat Ashagbesoro	(Nigeria) R2 Finesse Academy
Ayewe Helen	(Nigeria) R2 Finesse Academy
Success Iyoha	(Nigeria) R2 Finesse Academy
Perpetual Nwanna	(Nigeria) R2 Finesse Academy
Abiola Obazuaye	(Nigeria) R2 Finesse Academy
Becky Okitikpe	(Nigeria) R2 Finesse Academy
Adaolisa Thecular Onyedikachi	(Nigeria) R2 Finesse Academy
Olaitan Sanusi	(Nigeria) R2 Finesse Academy
Favour Irimagha	(England) Sheffield Eagles
Shondell Akhabue	(Australia) Wentworthville Magpies
Annique Omodiagbe	(Australia) Wests Tigers
Grace Oreofe David	(Nigeria) Zaria Bees
Faustina Akeje	Free Agent

=== Fixtures ===
Fixtures for the tournament were initially confirmed in March, and would see the two semi-finals in Brampton with the final in Toronto. In July, the fixtures were revised to include a third-place playoff, and would see all four game played in Brampton. The third-place playoff had no bearing on World Cup qualification but did count for world ranking purposes.

==== Semi-finals ====
21 October 2025
15:30 EDT (UTC-04:00)

Ireland	0–10	Nigeria
	Report	Tries: Omoghan, Iliya; Goals: Akhabue (0/1), Akeje (1/1)

Terry Fox Stadium, Brampton, Canada
Referee: Kemoy Whyte (Jamaica)

Team details
Ireland		Position	Nigeria
Name	Number	Position	Number	Name
Lily Rogan	1	FB	1	Blessing Umude
Cliodhna O'Sullivan	2	WG	2	Success Iyoha
Stephanie Carroll	3	CE	3	Blessing Aladegelu
Mollie Young	4	CE	4	Abiola Obazuaye
Aimee Clarke	5	WG	5	Endurance Ukwuoma
Emma Kelly	6	SO	6	Shondell Akhabue
Jade Walker	7	SH	7	Innocent Adaeze
Sarah Scambary	8	PR	8	Adeola King
Niamh Griffin	9	HK	9	Becky Okitikpe
Aifric Ni Ghibne	10	PF	10	Fedelia Omoghan
Tricia Doyle	11	SR	11	Rachel Iliya
Storm Cobain	12	SR	12	Vera Akhihiero-Pedro
Iona McCusker	13	LF	13	Faustina Akeje
Polly Roberts	14	IN	14	Chinaza Abbah
Jemma Gallagher	15	IN	15	Lauretta Bayere
Stacy Hanley	16	IN	16	Akinade Rukayat
Martha Dwyer	17	IN	17	Danyelle Shobanjo
Anna Potterton	18	RES
Matt Kennerson		Coach		Bolu Fagborun

21 October 2025
18:00 EDT (UTC-04:00)

Canada	0–48	Fiji
	Report	Tries: Staples, Marshall (2), Waterman (3), Laing, Paseka (3), Manu; Goals: Waterman (1/1), Yaranamu (2/9)

Terry Fox Stadium, Brampton, Canada
Referee: Tara Jones (England)

Team details
Canada		Position	Fiji
Name	Number	Position	Number	Name
Petra Woods	1	FB	1	Cassie Staples
Lauren Mueller	2	WG	2	Tahlia Marshall
Grace Campbell	3	CE	3	Isabella Waterman
Maddy Aberg	4	CE	4	Sienna Laing
Candace Scholten	5	WG	5	Maria Paseka
Alayna Scramstad	6	SO/FE	6	Sereana Naitokatoka
Danielle Franada	7	SH/HB	7	Luisa Yaranamu
Sarah Maguire	8	PR	8	Leilani Asham
Caitlin Sears	9	HK	9	Teaghan Hartigan
Chantelle Crowl	10	PF	10	Latisha Smythe
Gabrielle Hindley	11	SR	11	Tanika Newton
Eleta Mitton	12	SR	12	Elizabeth Naleba
Megan Pakulis	13	LF/LK	13	Kelilani Manu
Alanna Fittes	14	IN	14	Rory Muller
Rachel Choboter	15	IN	15	Joy Levy
Ada Okonkwo	16	IN	16	Ebony Laing
Rebecca Kochuk	17	IN	17	Naomi Tegu
Beth Hoffstetter	18	RES	18	Kinisalote Vusawa
Matt Barron		Coach		Joe Dakuitoga

==== Third-place playoff ====
26 October 2025
13:30 EDT (UTC-04:00)

Ireland	6–36	Canada
Tries: Doyle 12'; Goals: Cobain (1/2)	Report	Tries: Pakulis 9'; Mitton 47'; Scholten 52', 75'; Mueller 60'; Campbell 62'; Goals: Aberg (2/2); Sears (4/4)

Terry Fox Stadium, Brampton, Canada
Referee: Kemoy Whyte (Jamaica)

Team details
Ireland		Position	Canada
Name	Number	Position	Number	Name
Lily Rogan	1	FB	1	Petra Woods
Lena Kibler	2	WG	2	Lauren Mueller
Stephanie Carroll	3	CE	3	Grace Campbell
Anna Potterton	4	CE	4	Maddy Aberg
Mollie Young	5	WG	5	Candace Scholten
Emma Kelly	6	SO	6	Alayna Scramstad
Jade Walker	7	SH	7	Danielle Franada
Sarah Scambary	8	PR	8	Sarah Maguire
Polly Roberts	9	HK	9	Caitlin Sears
Jemma Gallagher	10	PF	10	Chantelle Crowl
Aifric Ni Ghibne	11	SR	11	Gabrielle Hindley
Tricia Doyle	12	SR	12	Beth Hoffstetter
Storm Cobain	13	LF	13	Megan Pakulis
Iona McCusker	14	IN	14	Alanna Fittes
Molly Boyne	15	IN	15	Rachel Choboter
Stacy Hanley	16	IN	16	Ada Okonkwo
Niamh Griffin	17	IN	17	Eleta Mitton
Aimee Clarke (not used)	18	RES	18	Maddie Hobson (not used)
Matt Kennerson		Coach		Matt Baron

==== Final ====
26 October 2025
15:00 EDT (UTC-04:00)

Nigeria	4–62	Fiji
Tries: Iyoha 38'	Report	Tries: Paseka 8'; Asham 12', 43', 78'; Laing 14'; Staples 17',31',48',56'; Marshall 20'; Tegu 72'; Goals: Yaranamu (9/11)

Terry Fox Stadium, Brampton, Canada
Referee: Tara Jones (England)

Team details
Nigeria		Position	Fiji
Name	Number	Position	Number	Name
Blessing Aladeyelu	1	FB	1	Cassie Staples
Success Iyoha	2	WG	2	Tahlia Marshall
Abiola Obazuaye	3	CE	3	Isabella Waterman
Siobhan Sheerin	4	CE	4	Sienna Laing
Endurance Ukwuoma	5	WG	5	Maria Paseka
Shondell Akhabue	6	SO/FE	6	Sereana Naitokatoka
Innocent Adaeze	7	SH/HB	7	Luisa Yaranamu
Adeola King	8	PR	8	Leilani Asham
Becky Okitikpe	9	HK	9	Teaghan Hartigan
Fedelia Omoghan	10	PF	10	Latisha Smythe
Rachel Iliya	11	SR	11	Tanika Newton
Vera Akhihiero-Pedro	12	SR	12	Elizabeth Naleba
Faustina Akeje	13	LF/LK	13	Kelilani Manu
Chinaza Abbah	14	IN	14	Rory Muller
Lauretta Bayere	15	IN	15	Joy Levy
Rukayat Akinade	16	IN	16	Ebony Laing
Danyelle Shobanjo	17	IN	17	Naomi Tegu
Aminah Olaniyan (not used)	18	RES	18	Kinisalote Vusawa (not used)
Bolu Fagborun		Coach		Joe Dakuitoga

=== Broadcasting ===
All four matches were streamed globally on CBC Sports YouTube channel.
