= France women's national rugby league team =

Represents France in women's rugby league

France
Team information
- Nicknames: Les Bleues; Les Tricolores; The Chanticleers (Anglophone media)
- Governing body: Fédération Française de Rugby à XIII
- Region: Europe
- Head coach: Alan Walsh
- Captain: Tallis Eranossian (née Kuresa)
- IRL ranking: 4 (20 August 2026)

Uniforms
First colours

Team results
- First international
- France 2 — 16 England (Albi, 7 July 2007)
- Biggest win
- France 116 — 0 Serbia (Avignon, 18 March 2023)
- Biggest defeat
- France 0 — 92 Australia (York, 6 November 2022); France 0 — 92 New Zealand (Christchurch, 25 October 2026)
- World Cup
- Appearances: 4 (first time in 2008)
- Best result: 2008 (one win)

The France women's national rugby league team, also known as the Chanticleers (for the Anglophone media) or locally as Les Tricolores, represents France in women's rugby league. They are administered by the French Rugby League Federation. On 7 July 2007, the team played their first international match; a 16–2 loss to England. France have competed at three World Cups: 2008, 2013 and 2021. With a victory over Serbia on 22 June 2024, they qualified for the 2026 Women's Rugby League World Cup.

== Head to head records ==
Opponent	FM	MR	M	W	D	L	Win%	PF	PA	Share
England	2007	2026	22	0	1	21	2.27%	112	844	11.72%
Australia	2008	2022	3	0	0	3	0.00%	0	224	0.00%
Russia	2008	2008	1	0	0	1	0.00%	12	18	40.00%
Samoa	2008	2008	1	0	0	1	0.00%	0	32	0.00%
Tonga	2008	2008	1	1	0	0	100.00%	34	4	89.47%
New Zealand	2013	2026	3	0	0	3	0.00%	0	226	0.00%
Italy	2018	2018	1	1	0	0	100.00%	60	0	100.00%
Turkey	2019	2019	1	1	0	0	100.00%	54	4	93.10%
Cook Islands	2022	2022	1	0	0	1	0.00%	18	26	40.91%
Serbia	2023	2024	2	2	0	0	100.00%	174	0	100.00%
Wales	2023	2023	1	1	0	0	100.00%	14	4	77.78%
Greece	2024	2024	1	1	0	0	100.00%	58	0	100.00%
Ireland	2025	2025	1	1	0	0	100.00%	34	4	89.47%
Nigeria	2026	2026	1	1	0	0	100.00%	36	8	81.82%
Papua New Guinea	2026	2026	1	0	0	1	0.00%	4	54	6.45%
Totals	2007	2026	41	9	1	31	21.95%	610	1,452	29.58%

Notes:

- Table last updated 25 October 2026.
- Share is the portion of "For" points compared to the sum of "For" and "Against" points.

== Players ==
The squad for the 2026 Rugby League World Cup was announced on social media on 4 October 2026. Tallis Eranossian (née Kuresa) had been designated as captain for the preceding matches, in July, on social media.

Table last updated 5 October 2026. Players' ages, where known, are as at that date.

Player	Age	Position(s)	Club	Profile	Debut	Caps	T	G	Pts
Elisa Akpa	34	Prop	Saint-Estève Catalan	Yes	2018	13	1	0	4
Tessa Benmalek	—	interchange	Saint-Estève Catalan	No	2026	1	0	0	0
Leïla Bessahli	29	Prop	Saint-Estève Catalan	Yes	2017	13	1	0	4
Stecy Bessiere	19	Second-row	RC Lescure-Arthes	Yes	2023	6	0	0	0
Camille Boudaud	32	Stand-off	RC Lescure-Arthes	No	2026	2	0	0	0
Margot Canal	27	Centre, Wing	Saint-Estève Catalan	Yes	2022	9	5	0	20
Lisa Diraison	—	Scrum-half	RC Lescure-Arthes	No	2024	5	0	18	36
Tallis Eranossian (née Kuresa)	31	Loose forward	RC Bègles XIII	Yes	2021	10	0	0	0
Chahrazad Himoudi	26	Wing	RC Lescure-Arthes	Yes	2018	5	3	0	12
Haoua Kessely	38	Prop	AS Ayguesvives	No	2024	3	6	0	24
Mélissa Medina	—	Centre	RC Lescure-Arthes	No	2025	2	2	0	8
Perrine Monsarrat	27	Second-row	RC Lescure-Arthes	Yes	2017	10	1	0	4
Élodie Pacull	34	Prop, Loose forward	RC Lescure-Arthes	Yes	2021	8	0	0	0
Perle Ramazeilles	30	Wing	RC Lescure-Arthes	Yes	2023	7	6	0	24
Fanny Ramos	31	Hooker	Saint-Estève Catalan	Yes	2017	12	5	0	20
Justine Roses	23	Stand-off	Saint-Estève Catalan	Yes	2023	7	3	0	12
Manon Samarra	34	Fullback	RC Lescure-Arthes	Yes	2017	17	5	0	20
Noémie Samuel	—	Hooker	RC Lescure-Arthes	No	2024	4	0	0	0
Salomé Ségala	28	Second-row, Prop	RC Lescure-Arthes	Yes	2023	9	0	0	0
Cristina Song-Puche	36	Scrum-half, Centre	Saint-Estève Catalan	Yes	2016	10	6	0	24
Louisa Tooman	23	Prop	RC Lescure-Arthes	Yes	2026	1	0	0	0
Sarah-Louise Vernay	—	Prop	Saint-Estève Catalan	No	2026	1	0	0	0
Amael Vilanove	25	Centre	AS Ayguesvives	Yes	2024	6	6	0	24

== Results ==
=== Full internationals ===
Date	Opponent	Score	Tournament	Venue	Video	Reports
7 Jul 2007	England	2–16	Test Match	Stade Municipal de Lescure d'Albigeois, Albi	—	
13 Jul 2008	England	4–42	Test Match	Widnes RUFC	—	
6 Nov 2008	Australia	0–60	2008 World Cup	Stockland Park, Sunshine Coast	—	
8 Nov 2008	England	4–54	2008 World Cup	Stockland Park, Sunshine Coast	—	
10 Nov 2008	Russia	12–18	2008 World Cup	Stockland Park, Sunshine Coast	—	
12 Nov 2008	Samoa	0–32	2008 World Cup	Stockland Park, Sunshine Coast	—	
14 Nov 2008	Tonga	34–4	2008 World Cup	Stockland Park, Sunshine Coast	—	
18 Jul 2009	England	8–28	2 Test Series	Stade Ernest Argeles, Toulouse	—	
25 Jul 2009	England	0–36	2 Test Series	Stade Ernest Argeles, Toulouse	—	
10 Jul 2010	England	8–40	Test Match	National Sports Centre, Lilleshall	—	
2 Jul 2011	England	6–40	2 Test Series	Parc Des Sports, Avignon	—	
6 Jul 2011	England	6–56	2 Test Series	Parc Des Sports, Avignon	—	
15 Jun 2012	England	0–48	Test Match	Grattan Stadium, Bradford	—	
5 Jul 2013	New Zealand	0–88	2013 World Cup	The Tetley's Stadium, Dewsbury		
8 Jul 2013	Australia	0–72	2013 World Cup	Post Office Road, Featherstone		
11 Jul 2013	England	4–42	2013 World Cup	Fox's Biscuits Stadium, Batley		
13 Jul 2013	England	0–54	2013 World Cup	South Leeds Stadium, Hunslet		
17 Jun 2015	England	4–24	2 Test Series	Stade Jean Benege, Tonneins		
20 Jun 2015	England	14–14	2 Test Series	Stade Roger Garnung, Biganos		
22 Oct 2016	England	6–36	Test Match	Parc des Sports, Avignon	—	
21 Jun 2017	England	16–26	2 Test Series	Stade de la Mer, Perpignan	—	
24 Jun 2017	England	8–14	2 Test Series	Stade de la Mer, Perpignan	—	
10 Nov 2018	Italy	60–0	Test Match	Stade Albert Domec, Carcassonne	—	
27 Oct 2018	England	4–54	Test Match	Stade Albert Domec, Carcassonne	—	
5 Oct 2019	Turkey	54–4	Test Match	Istanbul		
23 Oct 2021	England	4–40	Test Match	Stade Gilbert Brutus, Perpignan		
18 Jun 2022	England	10–36	Test Match	Halliwell Jones Stadium, Warrington		
2 Nov 2022	New Zealand	0–46	2021 World Cup	York Community Stadium, York		
6 Nov 2022	Australia	0–92	2021 World Cup	York Community Stadium, York		
10 Nov 2022	Cook Islands	18–26	2021 World Cup	York Community Stadium, York		
18 Mar 2023	Serbia	116–0	Test Match	Parc Des Sports, Avignon		
29 Apr 2023	England	0–64	Test Match	Halliwell Jones Stadium, Warrington		
29 Oct 2023	Wales	14–4	Test Match	Stade Albert Domec, Carcassonne		
13 Apr 2024	Greece	58–0	2026 World Cup European Qualifying	Stade Georges Dartiailh, Marmande		
22 Jun 2024	Serbia	58–0	2026 World Cup European Qualifying	Stadium FC Srem Jakovo, Belgrade		
29 Jun 2024	England	0–42	Test Match	Stade Ernest-Wallon, Toulouse		
12 Jul 2025	Ireland	34–4	Test Match	Garda RFC, Westmanstown Sports Centre, Dublin		
25 Jul 2026	England	4–38	Test Match	Stade Ernest-Wallon, Toulouse		
1 Aug 2026	Nigeria	36–8	Test Match	Stade Gilbert Brutus, Perpignan		
17 Oct 2026	Papua New Guinea	4–58	2026 World Cup	Santos Stadium, Port Moresby		
25 Oct 2026	New Zealand	0–92	2026 World Cup	One NZ Stadium, Christchurch		
31 Oct 2026	Fiji	6–54	2026 World Cup	Cbus Super Stadium, Gold Coast		

=== Other matches ===
The following tour, trial and warm-up matches have been played. This list is perhaps incomplete. It might be missing matches against Great Britain Under 21 team played between 2000 and 2007.

Date	Opponent	Score	Tournament	Venue	Video	Report(s)
7 Jul 2010	England Combined Services	20–14	Tour Match	Wakefield	—	
24 Feb 2018	Italy	12–4	France Est sélection	Stade Léo Lagrange, Toulon	—	
27 Oct 2022	Brazil	16–4	Warm-Up Match	The Millennium Stadium, Featherstone		

Notes:

- The France Est sélection team in February 2018 was selected from four clubs in the southeast zone: Montpellier, Lyon Villeurbanne, Marseille, and the Provençal XIII.
- In the October 2022 match, both teams fielded 23 players.

== Records ==
=== Margins and streaks ===
Biggest winning margins

Margin	Score	Opponent	Venue	Date
116	116–0	Serbia	Parc des Sports	18 Mar 2023
60	60–0	Italy	Stade Albert Domec	10 Nov 2018
58	58–0	Greece	Stade Georges Dartiailh	13 Apr 2024
54	54–0	Turkey	Beylerbeyl Stadium	28 Sep 2019
30	34–4	Tonga	Sunshine Coast Stadium	14 Nov 2008
30	34–4	Ireland	Westmanstown Sports Centre	12 July 2025

Biggest losing margins

Margin	Score	Opponent	Venue	Date
92	0–92	Australia	LNER Community Stadium	6 Nov 2022
92	0–92	New Zealand	One NZ Stadium	25 Oct 2026
88	0–88	New Zealand	Tetleys Stadium	5 July 2013
72	0–72	Australia	Bigfellas Stadium	8 July 2013
64	0–64	England	Halliwell Jones Stadium	29 Apr 2023
60	0–60	Australia	Sunshine Coast Stadium	6 Nov 2008
54	0–54	England	South Leeds Stadium	13 July 2013
50	4–54	England	Sunshine Coast Stadium	8 Nov 2008
50	6–56	England	Parc des Sports	6 Jul 2011
50	4–54	England	Stade Albert Domec	27 Oct 2018
48	0–48	England	Odsal Stadium	15 June 2012
46	0–46	New Zealand	LNER Community Stadium	2 Nov 2022
42	0–42	England	Stade Ernest-Wallon	29 June 2024

Most consecutive wins

Matches	First win	Last win	Days	Ended	Days
3	29 Oct 2023	22 Jun 2024	237 days	29 Jun 2024	244 days

Most consecutive losses

Matches	First loss	Last loss	Days	Ended	Days
11	18 Jul 2009	17 Jun 2015	5 years, 334 days	20 Jun 2015	5 years, 337 days
6	7 Jul 2007	12 Nov 2008	1 year, 129 days	14 Nov 2008	1 year, 131 days
5	23 Oct 2021	10 Nov 2022	1 year, 18 days	18 Mar 2023	1 year, 146 days

Note: France went winless for 15 matches from 18 July 2009 to 24 June 2017 (7 years, 341 days), with the losing sequence split by a draw in the twelfth of the fifteen matches, on 20 June 2015.

== See also ==
- France national rugby league team
- Rugby league in France
