= 2022 Women's Rugby League European Championship B =

Women's rugby league championship

2022 Women's European Championship B - North
- Number of teams: 3
- Winner: Wales
- Matches played: 3

2022 Women's European Championship B - South
- Number of teams: 3
- Winner: Greece
- Matches played: 3

The 2022 Women's Rugby League European Championship B was an international women's rugby league tournament that took place between June and October 2022. It was divided into two groups, with Ireland, Italy and Wales playing in the north, and Greece, Serbia and Turkey contesting the south.

Greece won the southern section, winning both their games in the team's first tournament. Wales won the northern section, also winning both their matches.

== Tables ==
North Group
Pos	Team	Pld	W	D	L	PF	PA	PD	Pts
1	Wales	2	2	0	0	104	4	+100	4
2	Ireland	2	1	0	1	34	50	−16	2
3	Italy	2	0	0	2	6	90	−84	0

Source: ERL

South Group
Pos	Team	Pld	W	D	L	PF	PA	PD	Pts
1	Greece	2	2	0	0	36	4	+32	4
2	Serbia	2	1	0	1	24	44	−20	2
3	Turkey	2	0	0	2	20	32	−12	0

Source: ERL

== Fixtures ==
=== North Group ===
11 June 2022
17:30 CEST (UTC+02:00)

Italy	6–30	Ireland
Tries: Menotti 80'; Goals: Pantaleoni (1/1)	Report (ERL)	Tries: Coleman (3) 2', 7', 16'; Cobain 30'; Lawless 38'; Willett 64'; Goals: Copley (2/5); McGuiness (1/1)

Pasian Di Pato Rugby Stadium, Udine
Attendance: 500
Referee: Tony Palacios (Spain)
Player of the Match: Ali Coleman (Ireland) & Rebecca Pantaleoni (Italy)

Team details
Italy		Position	Ireland
Name	Number	Position	Number	Name
Rebecca Pantaleoni	1	Fullback	1	Francessca Copley
Rwan Hassnien	2	Wing	2	Roisin Crowe
Giulia Colangeli	3	Centre	3	Bettie Lambert
Giada Arzenton	4	Centre	4	Steph Carroll
Camilla Matilde Giacomazzo	5	Wing	5	Ray Lawless
Alessandra Menotti	6	Stand off	6	Alex McGuinness
Cecilia Piva	7	Scrum half	7	Ella Synott
Marika Ascione	8	Prop forward	8	Mairead Quinn
Martina Dall'Antonia	9	Hooker	9	Erin Coll
Rosa Bettolatti	10	Prop forward	10	Clodagh Dunne
Siria Raisa	11	Second row	11	Storm Cobain
Altea Forto	12	Second row	12	Emma Curran
Virginia Pinarello	13	Loose forward	13	Ali Coleman
Marvin Severgnini	14	Interchange	14	Iona McCusker
Giulia Iozzia	15	Interchange	15	Stacy Hanley
Elisa Orofino	16	Interchange	16	Charlie Willett
Enrica Pandolfo	17	Interchange	17	Orla McCallion
Suin Pezzano		Coach		John Whalley

19 June 2022
13:00 BST (UTC+01:00)

Wales	60–0	Italy
Tries: R. Carr 3'; Michael 7'; Hughes 28'; Price (3) 39', 52', 60'; Davies 45'; King 56'; McGuire 71'; Marsh 74'; Sayle 78'; Goals: Salter (8/9)	Report (ERL); Report (WRL)

Pandy Park, Crosskeys
Attendance: 410
Referee: Fiona McConn (Ireland)
Touch judges: Rob Apsee (Wales), Chris Williams (Wales)

Team details
Wales		Position	Ireland
Name	Number	Position	Number	Name
Eleri Michael	1	Fullback	1	Rebecca Pantaleoni
Anne-Marie Sayle	2	Wing	2	Rwan Hassnien
Kathryn Salter	3	Centre	3	Giulia Colangeli
Rosie Carr	4	Centre	4	Silvia Gai
Brittony Price	5	Wing	5	Ludovica Gurrieri
Amberley Ruck	6	Stand off	6	Giada Arzenton
Rhi Parker	7	Scrum half	7	Alessandra Menotti
Lauren Aitken	8	Prop forward	8	Rosa Bettolatti
Carys Marsh	9	Hooker	9	Martina Dall'Antonia
Emily Hughes	10	Prop forward	10	Marika Ascione
Bryonie King	11	Second row	11	Marvin Severgnini
Charlie Mundy	12	Second row	12	Giulia Iozzia
Bethan Dainton	13	Loose forward	13	Virginia Pinarello
Molly Reardon	14	Interchange	14	Giulia Zaffarana
Joeann McGuire	15	Interchange	15	Camilla Matilde Giacomazzo
Fern Davies	16	Interchange	16	Siria Raisa
Katie Carr	17	Interchange	17	Altea Forto
Thomas Brindle		Coach		Coach:

8 October 2022
15:00 IST (UTC+01:00)

Ireland	4–44	Wales
Tries: Coleman 2'	Report (WRL); Report (ERL)	Tries: Ruck 15'; Carr (2) 22', 36'; Mundy 41'; Aitken 46'; Burnell (2) 56', 75'; Reardon 66'; Goals: Salter (6/8)

Estuary Road, Dublin
Attendance: 350
Referee: Will Gilder (England)

Team details
Ireland		Position	Wales
Name	Number	Position	Number	Name
Louise Burgess	1	Fullback	1	Leanne Burnell
Bettie Lambert	2	Wing	2	Brittony Price
Francessca Copley	3	Centre	3	Kathryn Salter
Ray Lawless	4	Centre	4	Rosie Carr
Roisin Crowe	5	Wing	5	Eleri Michael
Alex McGuinness	6	Stand off	6	Amberley Ruck
Jemma Farrell	7	Scrum half	7	Rhi Parker
Mairead Quinn	8	Prop forward	8	Fern Davies
Iona McCusker	9	Hooker	9	Carys Marsh
Clodagh Dunne	10	Prop forward	10	Lauren Aitken
Storm Cobain	11	Second row	11	Bryonie King (c)
Alison Coleman	12	Second row	12	Charlie Mundy
Philippa Birchall (c)	13	Loose forward	13	Emily Hughes
Louise McGonagle	14	Interchange	14	Molly Reardon
Amy O'Neill	15	Interchange	15	Ffion Jones
Lisa Callan	16	Interchange	16	Katie Carr
Charlie Willett	17	Interchange	17	Joeann McGuire
John Whalley		Coach		Thomas Brindle

=== South Group ===
25 September 2022
13:00 TRT (UTC+03:00)

Turkey	4–8	Greece
Tries: Sanliturk 13'	Report (ERL)	Tries: Koutsioumpa (2) 8', 75'

İTÜ Ayazağa Stadium, Istanbul
Referee: Stefan Stamenic (Serbia)

Team details
Turkey		Position	Greece
Name	Number	Position	Number	Name
Ozlem Kaya	1	Fullback	1	Magdelini Stavrianou
Derya Sanliturk	2	Wing	2	Dimitra Papoutsi
Gozde Gor	3	Centre	3	Irene Daslou
Aslihan Helvaci	4	Centre	4	Cleopatra Velmachou
Selin Ardal	5	Wing	5	Velissaria Koutsioumpa
Ecem Acıkgoz	6	Stand off	6	Antonia Voikli
Ece Tekin	7	Scrum half	7	Sofia-Margarita Kitsaneli
Hafize Berin Donmez	8	Prop forward	8	Maria-Anna Lamprou
Nurbanu Yorubulut	9	Hooker	9	Maria Avzoti
Elif Yilmaz	10	Prop forward	10	Maria-Eleni Gkirlemi
Elif Cinar	11	Second row	11	Magdelini Stavrianou,
lif Kutlu	12	Second row	12	Georgia-Fotini Koutsimpogeorgou
Nazife Taskin	13	Loose forward	13	Ourania Koutsikou
Meryem Savk	14	Interchange	14	Anna Spatharova
Tugcu Guvenc	15	Interchange	15	Asimina Mastoraki
Beyzanur Oktay	16	Interchange	16	Styliani Markou
Nazlican Filiz	17	Interchange	17	Chrysavgi Bakaloumi
Julien Treu		Coach		Stuart McLennan

2 October 2022
15:30 EEST (UTC+03:00)

Greece	28–0	Serbia
Tries: Koutsioumpa 8'; Velmachou 26'; Voikli (2) 46', 54'; Markou 71'; Stavrianou 79'; Goals: Kitsaneli (1/5); Velmachou (1/1)	Report (ERL)

Goritsa Stadium, Athens
Attendance: 400
Referee: Mike Smaill (New Zealand)
Touch judges: Aris Dardamanis (Greece), Nektarios Tsakalos (Greece)

Team details
Greece		Position	Serbia
Name	Number	Position	Number	Name
Magdelini Stavrianou	1	Fullback	1	Tamara Bošnjak
Velissaria Koutsioumpa	2	Wing	2	Ljiljana Bajic
Kleopatra Velmachou	3	Centre	3	Nika Bajic
Styliani Markou	4	Centre	4	Anastasija Karanovic
Dimitra Papoutsi	5	Wing	5	Katarina Veljanovsku
Antonia Voikli	6	Stand off	6	Jelena Stojiljkovic
Sofia-Margarita Kitsaneli	7	Scrum half	7	Karolina Blizanac
Maria-Anna Lamprou	8	Prop forward	8	Teodora Marin
Maria Avzoti	9	Hooker	9	Natasa Kovacevic
Maria-Eleni Gkirlemi	10	Prop forward	10	Jovana Fridl
Aspasia Stavrianou	11	Second row	11	Natalija Simic
Georgia-Fotini Koutsimpogeorgou	12	Second row	12	Sanja Starcevic
Ourania Koutsikou	13	Loose forward	13	Marija Maslakovic
Asimina Mastoraki	14	Interchange	14	Ksenija Bogojevic
Chrysavgi Bakaloumi	15	Interchange	15	Sanja Floric
Eirini Dakidi	16	Interchange	16	Natasa Vignjevic
Chrysi Lymperidi	17	Interchange	17	Marija Simovic

25 November 2022
14:00

Serbia	24–16	Turkey

TBA

Team details

FB	1
WG	2
CE	3
CE	4
WG	5
SO	6
SH	7
PR	8
HK	9
PR	10
SR	11
SR	12
LF	13
Interchange:
IN	14
IN	15
IN	16
IN	17
Coach:

FB	1
WG	2
CE	3
CE	4
WG	5
SO	6
SH	7
PR	8
HK	9
PR	10
SR	11
SR	12
LF	13
Interchange:
IN	14
IN	15
IN	16
IN	17
Coach:
