= Turkey women's national rugby league team =

Turkey
Team information
- Governing body: Turkish Rugby League Association
- Region: Europe
- Head coach: Julien Treu
- Captain: Melike Şahan
- Top try-scorer: Mehtap Korku (3)
- Top point-scorer: Mehtap Korku (12)
- IRL ranking: 28 (20 August 2026)

Team results
- First international
- Turkey 18–14 Italy (18 May 2019)
- Biggest win
- Turkey 40–4 Greece (14 September 2019)
- Biggest defeat
- Turkey 4–54 France (5 October 2019)

The Turkey women's national rugby league team represents Turkey in women's rugby league football. Their governing body is the Turkish Rugby League Association.

== Results ==
| Date | Opponent | Score | Tries | Goals | Competition | Venue | Video | Report |
|---|---|---|---|---|---|---|---|---|
| 18 May 2019 | Italy | 18–14 | Açıkgöz (6'), Gül (15'), Korku (49') | Ecem Açıkgöz 3/3 | International | Beylerbeyi 75. Yıl Stadium, Istanbul | Video | |
| 14 September 2019 | Greece | 40–4 | | | International | Trakya University Ayşekadın Stadium, Edirne | — | |
| 5 October 2019 | France | 4–54 | | | International | Esenler Stadium, Istanbul | Video | |
| 25 September 2022 | Greece | 4–8 | Sanliturk (13') | | European Championship B | İTÜ Ayazağa stadium, Istanbul | — | |
| 25 September 2022 | Serbia | 16–24 | Taskin (15'), Helvaci (49'), Doyuk (61') | Acikgoz 2/3 | European Championship B | FC Bask Arena, Belgrade | — | |

== See also ==
- Rugby league in Turkey
- Turkey national rugby league team
