= Wales women's national rugby league team =

Women's national rugby league teams

Wales
Team information
- Nickname: Dragons, Red Dragons
- Governing body: Wales Rugby League
- Region: Europe
- Head coach: Thomas Brindle
- Captain: Bethan Dainton
- Most caps: Kathryn Salter & Carys Marsh 12
- Top try-scorer: Leanne Burnell 5
- Top point-scorer: Kathryn Salter 52 (3 tries, 20 goals)
- IRL ranking: 9 ▼2 (20 August 2026)

Uniforms
First colours

Team results
- First international
- 25 Jun 2021 vs England
- Biggest win
- 60-0 vs Italy
- Biggest defeat
- 6-124 vs Australia
- World Cup
- Appearances: 1 (first time in 2026)
- Best result: 2026 Group stage

The Wales women's national rugby league team (Welsh: tîm rygbi'r gynghrair cenedlaethol merched Cymru), nicknamed the Dragons (Welsh: Dreigiau) or the Red Dragons (Welsh: Dreigiau Cochion), represents Wales in women's rugby league. They are administered by the Wales Rugby League.

== History ==
Wales's first match was a friendly against Great Britain Teachers in 2019, with a following friendly against England Lions (England's B team) in November of the same year. The first full international played by the team was in June 2021 against England. Wales entered their first World Cup qualifying campaign in 2024, and victories over Ireland and The Netherlands saw them qualifying for the 2026 Women's Rugby League World Cup on 22 June.

== Stadium ==
In July 2024, The Gnoll in Neath became the home stadium of the team as well as all other Welsh national rugby league teams.

== Head to head records ==
Opponent	FM	MR	M	W	D	L	Win%	PF	PA	Share
England	2021	2026	6	0	0	6	0.00%	12	366	3.17%
Ireland	2021	2024	3	2	0	1	66.67%	96	40	70.59%
Italy	2022	2022	1	1	0	0	100.00%	60	0	100.00%
France	2023	2023	1	0	0	1	0.00%	4	14	22.22%
Netherlands	2024	2024	1	1	0	0	100.00%	48	6	88.89%
Scotland	2025	2025	1	1	0	0	100.00%	18	12	60.00%
Canada	2026	2026	1	0	0	1	0.00%	0	14	0.00%
Samoa	2026	2026	1	0	0	1	0.00%	0	76	0.00%
Australia	2026	2026	1	0	0	1	0.00%	6	124	4.62%
Totals	2021	2026	16	5	0	11	31.25%	244	652	27.23%

Notes:

- Table last updated 11 November 2026.
- Share is the portion of "For" points compared to the sum of "For" and "Against" points.

== Players ==
The squad selected for the 2026 Women's Rugby League World Cup was announced on 28 September 2026. Bethan Dainton was named captain.

Player Profiles are available on the Rugby League Wales website.

Jersey numbers in the table reflect selections for the Round 2 match against Samoa.

J#	Player	Age	Position	Club	Full Internationals
J#	Player	Age	Position	Club	Debut	Caps	T	G	Pts
1	Leanne Burnell	33	Fullback	Cardiff Demons	2021	9	5	2	24
2	Zoe Heeley	28	Centre	Cardiff Demons	2026	2	0	0	0
3	Jade Mullen	34	Scrum-half	London Broncos	2026	1	0	0	0
4	Hannah Bluck	32	Centre, Wing	Cardiff Demons	2026	1	0	0	0
5	Sian Williams	22	Wing	North Queensland Cowboys	—	0	0	0	0
6	Amberley Ruck	32	Stand-off	Cardiff Demons	2021	7	1	2	8
7	Tayla Preston	27	Halfback	Canterbury-Bankstown Bulldogs	2026	1	0	1	2
8	Agnes Wood	27	Prop	York Valkyrie	2024	7	1	0	4
9	Jasmine Gibbons	25	Centre	Cardiff Demons	2023	9	0	0	0
10	Emily Hughes	30	Second-row	London Broncos	2021	8	1	0	4
11	Georgia Cussons	30	Second-row	Huddersfield Giants	2023	9	2	0	8
12	Paige Travis	27	Second-row, Lock	St Helens	2026	1	1	0	4
13	Bethan Dainton	37	Loose forward	Wigan Warriors	2022	10	4	0	16
14	Carys Marsh	29	Hooker	Wigan Warriors	2021	12	1	0	4
15	Kathryn Salter	31	Fullback	London Broncos	2021	12	3	20	52
16	Erin Williams	23	Second-row	Cardiff Demons	2026	1	0	0	0
17	Gracie Hobbs	24	Prop	Huddersfield Giants	2024	4	0	0	0
18	Katie Carr	24	Prop	Cardiff Demons	2022	9	0	0	0
19	Ffion Lewis	30	Scrum-half	London Broncos	2021	4	3	0	12
20	Lucia Davies	23	Centre	Cardiff Demons	2024	4	1	0	4
21	Frances Layton	26	Wing	Cardiff Demons	2026	2	0	0	0
–	Danielle McGifford	31	Wing	St Helens	2024	5	1	0	4
–	Hollie Brussels	21	Halfback, Hooker	Warrington Wolves	—	0	0	0	0

Notes:

- Georgia Cussons previously played under her maiden name, Taylor.
- Paige Travis had previously played 9 matches for England, scoring 4 tries.

== Results ==
Date	Opponent	Score	Tournament	Venue	Video	Report(s)
26 Oct 2019	Great Britain Teachers	6–30	Friendly	The Gnoll, Neath		
16 Nov 2019	England Amateurs	24–20	Friendly	Pilkington Recs, Ruskin Drive, St Helens		
25 Jun 2021	England	0–60	Test Match	Halliwell Jones Stadium, Warrington		
17 Oct 2021	Ireland	24–26	Test Match	Stadiwm ZipWorld, Colwyn Bay		
12 Jun 2022	England	6–32	Test Match	Pandy Park, Crosskeys		
19 Jun 2022	Italy	60–0	European Championship B	Pandy Park, Crosskeys	—	
8 Oct 2022	Ireland	44–4	European Championship B	Donnybrook, Dublin	—	
29 Oct 2023	France	4–14	Test Match	Stade Albert Domec, Carcassonne		
4 Nov 2023	England	0–60	Test Match (Note: Part of a double-header with the Third Test of the men's series between England and Tonga.)	Headingley Stadium, Leeds		
27 Apr 2024	Ireland	28–10	2026 World Cup qualification Europe Group A	Cardiff University Sports Fields		
22 Jun 2024	Netherlands	48–6	2026 World Cup qualification Europe Group A	Rugby Club Waterland, Purmerend		
2 Nov 2024	England	0–80	Test Match (Note: Part of a double-header with the Second Test of the men's series between England and Samoa.)	Headingley Stadium, Leeds		
3 Aug 2025	Scotland	18–12	Test Match	The Gnoll, Neath		
9 Aug 2025	England	0–62	Test Match	The Gnoll, Neath		
19 Jul 2026	Canada	0–14	Test Match	The Gnoll, Neath		
17 Oct 2026	England	6–70	2026 Women's Rugby League World Cup	HBF Park, Perth		
23 Oct 2026	Samoa	0–76	2026 Women's Rugby League World Cup	HBF Park, Perth		
1 Nov 2026	Australia	6–124	2026 Women's Rugby League World Cup	CommBank Stadium, Sydney		

== Records ==
=== Margins and streaks ===
Biggest winning margins

Margin	Score	Opponent	Venue	Date
60	60–0	Italy	Pandy Park	19 June 2022
42	48–6	Netherlands	RC Waterland	22 June 2024
40	44–4	Ireland	Estuary Road	8 Oct 2022

Biggest losing margins

Margin	Score	Opponent	Venue	Date
118	6–124	Australia	CommBank Stadium, Sydney	1 Nov 2026
82	0–82	England	Headingley Stadium	2 Nov 2024
64	6–70	England	HBF Park, Perth	17 Oct 2026
62	0–62	England	The Gnoll	9 Aug 2025
60	0–60	England	Headingley Stadium	4 Nov 2023
60	0–60	England	Halliwell Jones Stadium	25 June 2021
26	6–32	England	Pandy Park	12 June 2022

Most consecutive wins

Matches	First win	Last win	Days	Ended	Days
2	19 Jun 2022	8 Oct 2022	111 days	29 Oct 2023	1 year, 132 days
2	27 Apr 2024	22 Jun 2024	56 days	2 Nov 2024	189 days

Most consecutive losses

Matches	First loss	Last loss	Days	Ended	Days
4	9 Aug 2025	1 November 2026	1 year, 84 days	Current	1 year, 94 days
