= Serbia women's national rugby league team =

Serbian rugby league national team

Serbia
Team information
- Governing body: Serbian Rugby League
- Region: Europe
- Head coach: Slobodan Manak
- Most caps: Nika Bajić, Tamara Bošnjak & Marija Maslaković (10 each)
- Top try-scorer: Karolina Blizanac, Natalija Simic, Jelena Stoiljković & Katarina Veljanovsku (2 each)
- Top point-scorer: Karolina Blizanac, Natalija Simic, Jelena Stoiljković & Katarina Veljanovsku (8 each)
- Home stadium: Makiš Stadium, Belgrade
- IRL ranking: 18 ▼1 (20 August 2026)

Uniforms
First colours

Team results
- First international
- Italy 26–0 Serbia (22 June 2019)
- Biggest win
- Serbia 24–16 Turkey (22 November 2022)
- Biggest defeat
- Serbia 0–116 France (18 March 2023)

The Serbia women's national rugby league team is organised by the Serbian Rugby League and represents Serbia in international rugby league.

Serbia first played full international Test Matches in 2019. Their inaugural match was against Italy in Italy in June 2019. Serbia then hosted a two Test Match tour by Canada in September 2019.

Serbia participated in the 2022 Women's Rugby League European Championship (B Division).

Ahead of the 2026 Women's Rugby League World Cup, Serbia was drawn in Group B of the European Qualifiers. Serbia lost both qualifying matches.

== Head to head records ==
Opponent	FM	MR	M	W	D	L	Win%	PF	PA	Share
Italy	2019	2023	2	0	0	2	0.00%	14	60	18.92%
Canada	2019	2019	2	0	0	2	0.00%	10	60	14.29%
Greece	2022	2024	3	0	0	3	0.00%	8	68	10.53%
Turkey	2022	2022	1	1	0	0	100.00%	24	16	60.00%
France	2023	2024	2	0	0	2	0.00%	0	174	0.00%
Totals	2019	2024	10	1	0	9	10.00%	56	378	12.90%

Notes:

- Table last updated 23 Jun 2024.
- Share is the portion of "For" points compared to the sum of "For" and "Against" points.

== Current squad ==
The following players where named in a squad to play in the Group B European World Cup Qualifying matches in May and June 2024. Figures in the table include both qualifying matches (against Greece and France).

Olivera Mišković and Karolina Blizanac were included in the squad of 19 for the match against France but were omitted from the 17 that played. Five players that were in the team for the match against Greece, were omitted from the 19 selected for the match against France: Jelena Stoiljković, Lea Milošević, Cleopatra Carreno, Jovana Fridl, and Dunja Stojiljkovic.

Player	Position	Club	Debut	Matches	Tries	Goals	Points
Tamara Bošnjak	Fullback	Red Star	2019	10	0	3	6
Teodora Micic	Wing, Centre	Red Star	2023	5	0	0	0
Sanja Starcevic	Centre, Second-row	Red Star	2022	7	1	0	4
Marija Stojšić	Centre	Red Star	2024	2	0	0	0
Anastasija Karanović	Wing, Centre	RLC Partisan 1953	2022	6	1	0	4
Ljiljana Bajić	Stand-off	Red Star	2019	8	0	0	0
Katarina Veljanovsku	Scrum-half, Wing	Red Star	2022	7	2	0	8
Natalija Simic	Prop, Second-row	Red Star	2020	6	2	0	8
Nataša Kovačević	Hooker, Stand-off	Red Star	2019	8	0	0	0
Teodora Marin	Prop	Red Star	2022	6	0	0	0
Mihaela Markicevic	Second-row	Unknown	2024	1	0	0	0
Anna Liuter	Second-row, Prop	Dorćol Spiders	2023	3	0	0	0
Marija Maslaković	Lock, Prop	Red Star	2019	10	1	0	4
Marija Simovic	interchange	Red Star	2022	5	0	0	0
Milica Cvijetanovic	interchange	RLC Partisan 1953	2024	1	0	0	0
Nika Bajić	interchange	Red Star	2019	10	0	0	0
Uma Cengaj	interchange	Red Star	2023	4	0	0	0
Olivera Mišković	interchange	FK Arsenal Tivat	2024	2	0	0	0
Karolina Blizanac	Hooker	Red Star	2019	8	2	0	8
Jelena Stoiljković	Wing	Red Star	2019	9	2	0	8
Lea Milošević	Scrum-half	Wentworthville	2024	1	0	0	0
Cleopatra Carreno	Loose forward	Camden Rams	2024	1	0	0	0
Jovana Fridl	interchange	Red Star	2019	7	0	0	0
Dunja Stojiljkovic	interchange	Red Star	2024	1	0	0	0

== Results ==
=== Full internationals ===
Date	Opponent	Score	Tournament	Venue	Video	Reports
22 Jun 2019	Italy	0 - 26	Test Match	Lignano, Italy	—	
14 Sep 2019	Canada	6 - 34	2 Test Series	SC inge, Belgrade	—	
21 Sep 2019	Canada	4 - 26	2 Test Series	Makiš Stadium, Belgrade	—	
2 Oct 2022	Greece	0 – 28	2022 European Championship B	Gorytsa Park Field, Aspropyrgos	—	
25 Nov 2022	Turkey	24 – 16	2022 European Championship B	FC Bask Arena, Belgrade	—	
18 Mar 2023	France	0 – 116	Test Match	Parc Des Sports, Avignon		
3 Jun 2023	Italy	14 – 34	Test Match	Pasian Di Prato Stadium, Udine	—	
11 Nov 2023	Greece	4 – 8	Balkan Cup	FC Pusta Reka, Bojnik	—	
18 May 2024	Greece	4 – 32	WC Qualifier (Euro Group B)	Nea Smyrni Stadium, Athens		
22 Jun 2024	France	0 – 58	WC Qualifier (Euro Group B)	Stadium FC Srem Jakovo, Belgrade		

== Past squads ==
The following players were selected to represent Serbia in the three Test Matches of 2019.

Player	Italy Only Test	Canada 1st Test	Canada 2nd Test	Caps	Tries	Goals	Pts
Ana Marija Škiljo	Centre	—	—	1			0
Anastasija Karanović	—	positions	—	1			0
Dragana Žeželj	interchange	—	interchange	2			0
Dragica Kovačević	—	Second-row	Second-row	2			0
Isidora Savković	Five-eighth	Halfback	Centre	3			0
Ivana Artinović	interchange	—	—	1			0
Ivana Djordjevic	—	interchange	interchange	2			0
Jelena Lazić	—	interchange	—	1			0
Jelena Stoiljković	Halfback	Five-eighth	Five-eighth	3	1		4
Jovana Fridl	Second-row	—	—	1			0
Karolina Blizanac	Hooker	Hooker	Hooker	3			0
Katarina Perović	—	—	Wing	1			0
Ljiljana Bajić	Wing	interchange	—	2			0
Maja Baošić	—	Lock	Lock	2	1	1	6
Marija Bajić	Wing	—	—	1			0
Marija Maslaković	Prop	Prop	Prop	3			0
Marija Milosavljević	Fullback	Fullback	Fullback	3			0
Marija Zlatković	—	Wing	—	1			0
Milica Krasić	interchange	Centre	Wing	3			0
Nataša Kovačević	—	—	interchange	1			0
Nika Bajić	Second-row	Second-row	Prop	3			0
Olivera Mišković	—	interchange	interchange	2			0
Sara Trifković	interchange	—	—	1			0
Tamara Bošnjak	Centre	Centre	Centre	3			0
Vanja Pešić	Lock	—	—	1			0
Željana Mitrović	Prop	Prop	Second-row	3			0
Zorica Kostić	—	Wing	Halfback	2			0

== See also ==
- Rugby league in Serbia
- Serbia national rugby league team
