= Ireland women's national rugby league team =

Ireland
Team information
- Governing body: Rugby League Ireland
- Region: Europe
- Head coach: Matt Kennerson
- Captain: Storm Cobain
- Top try-scorer: Ali Coleman 5 Storm Cobain 5
- Top point-scorer: Storm Cobain 46 (5 tries, 13 goals)
- Home stadium: Energia Park
- IRL ranking: 8 (20 August 2026)

Uniforms
First colours

Team results
- First international
- Ireland 26 – 24 Wales at Colwyn Bay, 17 October 2021
- Biggest win
- Ireland 42 – 6 Netherlands at Sassenheim, 4 October 2025
- Biggest defeat
- Ireland 4 – 44 Wales at Dublin, 8 October 2022

The Ireland women's national rugby league team is organised by Rugby League Ireland and represents Ireland in international rugby league.

Ireland first fielded a women's Rugby League team in October 2021, winning their inaugural Test Match against Wales.

== Head to head records ==
Opponent	FM	MR	M	W	D	L	Win%	PF	PA	Share
Wales	2021	2024	3	1	0	2	33.33%	40	96	29.41%
Italy	2022	2022	1	1	0	0	100.00%	30	6	83.33%
Canada	2022	2025	2	1	0	1	50.00%	14	42	25.00%
Netherlands	2024	2024	2	2	0	0	100.00%	58	18	76.32%
Greece	2024	2024	1	1	0	0	100.00%	42	6	87.50%
France	2025	2025	1	0	0	1	0.00%	4	34	10.53%
Nigeria	2025	2025	1	0	0	1	0.00%	0	10	0.00%
Totals	2021	2025	11	6	0	5	54.54%	188	212	47.00%

Notes:

- Table last updated 29 October 2025.
- Share is the portion of "For" points compared to the sum of "For" and "Against" points.

== Coaches ==
The inaugural head coach of the Ireland women's national rugby league team was John Whalley.

In January 2024, Rugby League Ireland announced the appointment of Matt Kennerson as the Head Coach.

== Players ==
The table below lists the extended squad named by Rugby League Ireland ahead of the 2025 World Series Qualifier for the 2026 World Cup. The squad of 33 included the 19 players that were previously selected for the match against France on 12 July 2025. Orlaith McAuliffe was named captain for that match.

A squad of 20 players for the match against the Netherlands was announced on 1 October ahead of their fixture on 4 October 2025. On social media the team was listed in alphabetical order of the players' given names, from Aifric Ni Ghibne to Storm Cobain. Amelia Newtown was added to the extended squad for the Netherlands match.

Jersey numbers reflect, and tallies in the table include, the match against the Netherlands on 4 October 2025.

J#	Player	Age	Position(s)	Club	Profile	Debut	M	T	G	P
1	Aimee Clarke	–	Fullback, Wing	(Ireland) Dublin City Exiles	Yes	2025	2	0	0	0
2	Lena Kibler	–	Wing, Scrum-half	(Ireland) Dublin City Exiles	Yes	2025	1	0	0	0
3	Stephanie Carroll	–	Centre, Wing	Mount Pritchard Mounties	No	2021	3	2	0	8
4	Mollie Young	23	Centre	Leigh Leopards	Yes	2022	4	1	0	4
5	Cliodhna O'Sullivan	–	Wing, Stand-off	(Ireland) Dublin City Exiles	Yes	2024	5	1	0	4
6	Emma Kelly	–	Stand-off	(Ireland) Dublin City Exiles	Yes	2025	2	0	0	0
7	Jade Walker	–	Scrum-half, Stand-off	London Broncos	No	2024	3	0	0	0
8	Aifric Ni Ghibne	–	Prop, Fullback	Engadine Dragons	Yes	2025	2	0	0	0
9	Niamh Griffin	–	Hooker	(Ireland) Dublin City Exiles	Yes	2024	3	0	0	0
10	Stacy Hanley	30	Prop, Second-row	Engadine Dragons	Yes	2022	5	1	0	4
11	Storm Cobain	27	Second-row, Loose forward	Leigh Leopards	Yes	2021	9	5	13	46
12	Anna Potterton	–	Second-row, Centre	(Ireland) Dublin City Exiles	Yes	2024	3	0	0	0
13	Iona McCusker	–	Loose forward	London Broncos	No	2021	7	2	0	8
14	Polly Roberts	–	Hooker	London Broncos	No	2024	3	0	0	0
15	Molly Boyne	28	Second-row	(Ireland) Dublin City Exiles	Yes	2025	2	0	0	0
16	Becky Webb	29	Second-row	Widnes Vikings	Yes	2025	2	0	0	0
17	Katie Ann McCallion	–	Hooker	(Ireland) Banbridge Broncos	No	2025	1	0	0	0
18	Amelia Newton	–	Loose forward	Swinton Lions	No	—	0	0	0	0
–	Caoimhe Molloy	–	Loose forward	(Ireland) Dublin City Exiles	Yes	2024	3	2	0	8
–	Orlaith McAuliffe	–	Prop, Loose forward	(Ireland) Dublin City Exiles	Yes	2022	3	0	0	0
–	Aine Rutley	–	Second-row, Prop	(Ireland) Dublin City Exiles	Yes	2024	2	0	0	0
–	Alice Fitzgerald	–	Wing	(Ireland) Dublin City Exiles	No	2024	2	1	0	4
–	Holly O'Dwyer	26	Wing, Centre	(Ireland) Galway Tribeswomen	Yes	2024	3	2	0	8
–	Jemma Gallagher	–	Prop	Corrimal Cougars	No	—	0	0	0	0
–	Katie Ann O'Neill	–	Centre, Second-row	(Ireland) Dublin City Exiles	Yes	2025	1	0	0	0
–	Lily Rogan	21	Centre, Wing	Wests Tigers	Yes	—	0	0	0	0
–	Lisa Callan	–	Second-row	(Ireland) Dublin City Exiles	Yes	2022	4	0	0	0
–	Lydia Egan	–	Prop	Salford Red Devils	No	2024	1	0	0	0
–	Martha Dwyer	–	Lock	Aspley Devils	No	—	0	0	0	0
–	Megan Preston	30	Hooker, Centre	Huddersfield Giants	Yes	2024	3	1	0	4
–	Rachel Morton	–	Prop	(Ireland) Banbridge Broncos	No	2024	2	0	0	0
–	Roisin Crowe	–	Fullback	Engadine Dragons	Yes	2021	3	0	0	0
–	Sarah Madison Boyle	–	Prop	Mount Pritchard Mounties	No	—	0	0	0	0
–	Tricia Doyle	–	Second-row, interchange	Aspley Devils	No	2024	3	1	0	4

== Results ==
=== Full internationals ===
Date	Opponent	Score (Note: Ireland score given first)	Tournament	Venue	Video	Reports
17 Oct 2021	Wales	26–24	Test Match	Stadiwm ZipWorld, Colwyn Bay		
11 Jun 2022	Italy	30–6	European Championships B	Pasian Di Pato Rugby Stadium, Udine		
8 Oct 2022	Wales	4–44	European Championships B	Energia Park, Dublin	—	
25 Oct 2022	Canada	8–6	Test Match	Orrell St James Rugby League Club, Wigan	—	
27 Apr 2024	Wales	10–28	WC Qualifier (Euro Group A)	Cardiff University Sports Fields		
19 May 2024	Netherlands	16–12	WC Qualifier (Euro Group A)	Energia Park, Dublin		
12 Oct 2024	Greece	42–6	WC Qualifier (Euro Playoff)	Gkorytsa Stadium, Aspropygos, Athens		
12 July 2025	France	4–34	Test Match	Garda RFC, Westmanstown Sports Centre, Dublin	—	
4 Oct 2025	Netherlands	42–6	Test Match	Rugby Club The Bassetts. Sassenheim		
21 Oct 2025	Nigeria	0–10	World Series	Terry Fox Stadium, Brampton, Ontario	—	
26 Oct 2025	Canada	6–36	World Series	Terry Fox Stadium, Brampton, Ontario	—	

== See also ==
- Rugby league in Ireland
- Rugby League Ireland
- Ireland women's national rugby union team
