= Greece women's national rugby league team =

Greece
Team information
- Governing body: Greek Rugby League Association
- Region: Europe
- Head coach: Jim Minadakis
- Captain: Ourania Koutsikou
- Top try-scorer: Velissaria Koutsioumpa (3)
- Top point-scorer: Velissaria Koutsioumpa (12)
- IRL ranking: 15 ▼4 (20 August 2026)

Team results
- First game
- Turkey 40 - 4 Greece (14 September 2019)
- Biggest win
- Greece 28 - 0 Serbia (2 October 2022)
- Biggest defeat
- Turkey 40 - 4 Greece (14 September 2019)

The Greece women's national rugby league team represents Greece in women's rugby league football. Founded in 2019 by the Greek Rugby League Association, the team played its first game in September 2019 in a friendly match against Turkey.

Due to the COVID-19 pandemic and the politics surrounding the governance of rugby league in Greece the team did not play its first full (as opposed to a friendly) international match until September 2022, when they entered the Southern group of the 2022 Rugby League Women's European Championship B. The first home international match took place at Gorytsa Park field, Aspropyrgos on 2 October 2022.

In January 2023, a team of Australian-based players of Greek heritage played an international match in Sydney against the Philippines, under national coach Stuart McLennan.

== Head to head records ==
Opponent	FM	MR	M	W	D	L	Win%	PF	PA	Share
Turkey	2019	2022	2	1	0	1	50.0%	12	44	21.43%
Serbia	2022	2024	3	3	0	0	100.00%	68	8	89.47%
Philippines	2023	2023	1	0	0	1	0.00%	0	38	0.00%
Netherlands	2023	2025	2	0	0	2	0.00%	0	48	0.00%
France	2024	2024	1	0	0	1	0.00%	0	58	0.00%
Ireland	2024	2024	1	0	0	1	0.00%	6	42	12.50%
United States	2025	2025	1	0	0	1	0.00%	0	46	0.00%
Totals	2019	2025	11	4	0	7	36.36%	86	284	23.24%

Notes:

- Table last updated: 14 December 2025
- Share is the portion of "For" points compared to the sum of "For" and "Against" points.

== Current squad ==
=== Combined team ===
The following players were named in a squad to play against the United States in Las Vegas on 28 February 2025. Players came from Greece, Australia, Wales and the United States.

Tallies in the table include the matches played on 28 February and 13 December 2025.

Player	Position	Club	Debut	Matches	Tries	Goals	Points
Asimina Mastoraki	Fullback, Stand-off, Hooker	Aris Eagles	2019	10	0	0	0
Magdelini Stavrianou	Wing, Fullback, Scrum-half	Athens City Raiders	2022	9	0	0	0
Samantha Glumac	Centre, Wing	Mounties	2025	1	0	0	0
Ourania Koutsikou	Centre, Prop, Loose forward	Cardiff Demons	2019	9	3	0	12
Sotiria Skouroliakou	Wing	Aris Eagles	2024	3	0	0	0
Angelina Ballas	Stand-off, Centre, Second-row	North Sydney Bears	2023	2	0	0	0
Sofia-Margarita Kitsaneli	Scrum-half, Prop	Aris Eagles	2019	8	0	1	2
Lavinia Taukamo	Prop	Redfern All Blacks	2023	2	0	0	0
Meleanna Waters	Hooker, Loose forward	Mascot	2023	2	0	0	0
Maria-Eleni Gkirlemi	Prop, Second-row	Aris Eagles	2022	7	0	0	0
Lisa Paloukis	Second-row, Prop, Wing	West Belconnen Warriors	2025	1	0	0	0
Stephanie Glumac	Second-row	Mounties	2023	2	0	0	0
Nicola Munday	Loose forward	North Brisbane (Union)	2025	1	0	0	0
Ella Panagiotopoulos	Loose forward, Second-row, Centre	Belconnen Sharks	2025	1	0	0	0
Efstathia Skoroliakou	Hooker	Aris Eagles	2024	2	0	0	0
Eleni Zis	interchange	Atlanta Rhinos	2025	1	0	0	0
Klaudia Koule	interchange	Athens City Raiders	2025	1	0	0	0
Georgia Kalomenopoulou	interchange	Aris Eagles	2025	1	0	0	0
Hayley Papa		Toukley Hawks	—	0	0	0	0

=== Greece based ===
The following players were named in a squad to play in the 13 December 2025 match against the Netherlands. The selected team was posted of social media on the morning of the match.

Tallies in the table include the match played on 13 December 2025.

J#	Player	Position	Club	Debut	Matches	Tries	Goals	Points
1	Sofia Anagnostopoulou	Fullback, Wing	Cretan Gunners	2023	6	0	0	0
2	Efstathia Skouroliakou	Wing	Aris Eagles	2025	1	0	0	0
3	Anna Limperi	Centre, Prop	Aris Eagles	2023	5	0	0	0
19	Sidar Timurturkan	Centre	Cretan Gunners	2025	1	0	0	0
5	Magdelini Stavrianou	Wing, Scrum-half	AEK	2022	9	0	0	0
6	Georgia Kalomenopoulou	Stand-off	Aris Eagles	2025	1	0	0	0
7	Ourania Koutsikou	Scrum-half, Loose forward	Cretan Gunners	2019	9	3	0	12
8	Kalliopi Angelakopoulos	Prop	Aris Eagles	2025	1	0	0	0
9	Asimina Mastoraki	Hooker, Fullback	Aris Eagles	2019	10	0	0	0
15	Triantafyllia Vasilogianni	Prop	Aris Eagles	2024	2	0	0	0
11	Dimitra Papoutsi	Second-row, Wing	AEK	2019	9	2	0	8
21	Katerina Niavradakis	Second-row	Cretan Gunners	2025	1	0	0	0
13	Maria-Eleni Gkirlemi	Loose forward, Prop	Aris Eagles	2022	7	0	0	0
14	Efrosini Tsiritaki	interchange	Aris Eagles	2025	1	0	0	0
10	Paraskevi-Anna Daldaki	interchange	AEK	2025	1	0	0	0
16	Georgia Pournara	interchange	Cretan Gunners	2025	1	0	0	0
17	Vasiliki Roumpi	interchange	Panionios	2023	2	0	0	0
18	Sotiria Skouroliakou	Wing	Aris Eagles	2024	3	0	0	0
–	Christina Faitakis	positions	Cretan Gunners	—	0	0	0	0

=== Australian based ===
The following Australian-based players of Greek heritage represented Greece in the January 2023 international match against the Philippines.

Alexia Foster Papanicolau, Antonia Karias, Taliah Mafi, Angelina Ballas, Ebony Tsoukas, Lavinia Taukamo, Maria Posantzis, Cherish Tseros, Jonaya Bent, Mikayla Tuliatu, Christine Tsougranis, Stella Lellis, Meleanna Waters. Interchange: Jasmin Testa, Lisa Poulakis, Simone Stephen, Stephanie Glumac

== Results ==
=== Full internationals ===
Date	Opponent	Score (Note: Greece score given first)	Tournament	Venue	Video	Report(s)
14 Sep 2019	Turkey	4–40	Test Match	Trakya University; Ayşekadın Stadium, Edirne	Highlights	
25 Sep 2022	Turkey	8–4	2022 Euro B	Technical Uni, Istanbul	Full game	
2 Oct 2022	Serbia	28–0	2022 Euro B	Gorytsa Park Field, Aspropyrgos	1st half 2nd half	
28 Jan 2023	Philippines	0–38	Test Match	Lidcombe Oval, Sydney	—	
11 Nov 2023	Serbia	8–4	Balkan Cup	FC Pusta Reka, Bojnik	—	
9 Dec 2023	Netherlands	0–14	Test Match	Municipal Stadium Dimitris Nikolaidis, Athens	—	
13 Apr 2024	France	0–58	WCQ Euro B	Stade Georges Dartiailh, Marmande	—	
18 May 2024	Serbia	32–4	WCQ Euro B	A.G. Dimitrios Stadium, Athens	Full game	
12 Oct 2024	Ireland	6–42	WC Qualifier (Euro Playoff)	Gkorytsa Stadium, Aspropygos, Athens	Full game	
28 Feb 2025	United States	0–46	RL Las Vegas	Silverbowl Park, Las Vegas	Full game	
13 Dec 2025	Netherlands	34–0	Test Match	Rugby Club Sparta, Rotterdam	—	
17 Oct 2026	Jamaica	6–20	International	Chania, Crete	—	

== Upcoming fixtures ==
The Greek Rugby League Federation announced in early September 2026:

- Netherlands on 24 October 2026 in Chania, Crete, Greece.

Greece participated in the qualification process for the World Cup to be held in October and November 2026, but they were eliminated.

== See also ==
- Rugby league in Greece
- Greece national rugby league team (men)
