= Italy women's national rugby league team =

Italia
Team information
- Governing body: Federazione Italiana Rugby League
- Region: Europe
- Head coach: Alberto Suin
- Captain: Virginia Pinarello
- Most caps: Alessandra Menotti 7
- Top try-scorer: 6 players with 2 tries each
- Top point-scorer: Rosaluna Gavagna 10; Rebecca Pantaleoni 10
- IRL ranking: 23 ▼2 (20 August 2026)

Team results
- First international
- Lebanon 0–22 Italy (25 February 2017)
- Biggest win
- Serbia 0–26 Italy (22 June 2019)
- Biggest defeat
- France 60–0 Italy (10 November 2018)

The Italy women's national rugby league team represents Italy in rugby league football. Their governing body, the Federazione Italiana Rugby League, was formed in 2008. As of December 2025 they are ranked 21st in the IRL Women's World Rankings.

== Current squad ==
On 2 October 2025 an Italy team composed of Australian based players was announced ahead of a game on 4 October 2025 against Lebanon at Lidcombe Oval, Sydney. Previously the Italy women's team had been selected from Italy based players.

=== Australian based players ===
The selected team comprised four players with NRL Women's Premiership experience. Six members of the squad had experience in the competition tier below the NRLW, the NSWRL Women's Premiership or the QRL Women's Premiership. The remaining players were selected from teams in lower tier competitions, such as the Sydney Metro Women's Gold competition.

Position(s)	Player	International					Club	Career Club Matches
Position(s)	Player	Debut	Caps	T	G	Pts	Club	NRLW	2nd	U19
Fullback	Rebecca Pollard	2025	1	0	0	0	Wests Tigers	17	31	0
Wing	Marissa Acquasanta	2025	1	1	0	4	Mounties	0	0	0
Centre	Brielle Luccitti	2025	1	0	2	4	Mounties	0	6	9
Centre	Kiara Barnes	2025	1	0	0	0	Briars Rugby Union	0	0	0
Wing	Brandy Yallop	2025	1	3	0	12	Northern Pride	0	13	6
Stand-off	Nikki Perugini	2025	1	0	0	0	Helensburgh Tigers	0	20	0
Scrum-half	Rhiannon Gregorio	2025	1	0	0	0	Mounties	0	0	0
Prop	Bronte Wilson	2025	1	0	0	0	St. George Dragons	13	7	9
Hooker	Kayla Fleming	2025	1	2	0	8	Burleigh Bears	0	7	17
Prop	Deborah Wilson	2025	1	0	0	0	Mounties	0	0	0
Second-row	Josie Lenaz	2025	1	0	0	0	Parramatta Eels	6	58	0
Second-row	Ashleigh Maiuri	2025	1	0	0	0	Brisbane Tigers	0	0	5
Lock	Abbey Krzanic	2025	1	0	0	0	St. George Dragons	0	4	0
interchange	Amali Ahmet	2025	1	0	0	0	All Saints Toongabbie Tigers	0	0	0
interchange	Takira Gaspari	2025	1	0	0	0	Gungahlin Bulls	0	0	0
interchange	Sofia Osman	2025	1	0	0	0	Gungahlin Bulls	0	0	0
interchange	Hanna Krzanic	2025	1	0	0	0	Fortitude Valley Diehards	0	0	0
positions	Alyssa Gattellari	—	0	0	0	0	—
	Grace Giampino	—	0	0	0	0	Newcastle Knights	4	21	7
	Tanaya Iaria	—	0	0	0	0	Mounties	0	1	0

=== European based players ===
Squad for the 2026 World Cup Preliminary Play-Off Qualifier against Netherlands, which was held on Saturday, 27 April, 2024 in Mogliano.
Tallies in the table include the match against Netherlands.

Position	Player	Debut	Caps	T	G	Pts	Club
Fullback, Stand-off	Alessandra Menotti	2018	7	2	0	8	Leonesse Venete XIII
Wing	Rwan Hassnien	2022	4	2	0	8	Brianza Tigers XIII
Centre	Loide Agosta	2023	2	0	0	0	Leonesse Venete XIII
Centre, Wing	Camilla Matilde Giacomazzo	2022	4	1	0	4	Leonesse Venete XIII
Wing	Lilian Bremang	2024	1	0	0	0	Casalmaggiore Rugby XIII
Stand-off	Martina Dall'Antonia	2022	4	0	2	4	Leonesse Venete XIII
Scrum-half, Stand-off	Valentina Virgili	2017	4	0	4	8	Brianza Tigers XIII
Prop, Second-row	Giulia Iozzia	2018	5	1	0	4	Brianza Tigers XIII
Hooker	Camilla Vio	2024	1	0	0	0	Leonesse Venete XIII
Prop	Vanessa Bertini	2024	1	0	0	0	Casalmaggiore Rugby XIII
Second-row, Centre	Silvia Gai	2017	4	0	0	0	Brianza Tigers XIII
Second-row	Altea Forto	2019	6	2	0	8	Leonesse Venete XIII
Loose forward, Second-row	Marvin Severgnini	2022	4	1	0	4	Brianza Tigers XIII
interchange	Alissa Meinero	2024	1	0	0	0	Casalmaggiore Rugby XIII
interchange	Alice Bottaro	2024	1	0	0	0	Leonesse Venete XIII
interchange	Ilenia Bollini	2024	1	0	0	0	Brianza Tigers XIII
interchange	Fabiola Tosetti	2024	1	0	0	0	Brianza Tigers XIII
—	Giorgia Boarin	—	0	0	0	0	Brianza Tigers XIII
—	Noemi Dalla Villa	—	0	0	0	0	Leonesse Venete XIII

== Competitive record ==
=== Head to head records ===
Opponent	FM	MR	M	W	D	L	Win%	PF	PA	Share
Lebanon	2017	2025	2	1	0	1	50.00%	50	36	58.14%
France	2018	2018	1	0	0	1	0.00%	0	60	0.05%
Turkey	2019	2019	1	0	0	1	0.00%	14	18	43.75%
Serbia	2019	2023	2	2	0	0	100.00%	60	14	81.08%
Ireland	2022	2022	1	0	0	1	0.00%	6	30	16.67%
Wales	2022	2022	1	0	0	1	0.00%	0	60	0.00%
Netherlands	2024	2024	1	0	0	1	0.00%	6	56	9.68%
Totals	2017	2025	9	3	0	6	33.33%	136	274	33.17%

Notes:

- Table last updated 4 October 2025.
- Share is the portion of "For" points compared to the sum of "For" and "Against" points.

=== Results ===
==== Full internationals ====
Date	Score (Note: Italy score given first)	Opponent	Competition	Venue	Attendance	Ref
25 February 2017	22–0	Lebanon	Friendly	Fouad Chehab Stadium, Jounieh		
10 November 2018	0–60	France	Friendly	Stade Albert Domec, Carcassonne		
18 March 2019	14–18	Turkey	Friendly	Baylerbeyi Stadium, Istanbul	250	
22 June 2019	26–0	Serbia	Friendly	Lignano	100	
11 June 2022	6–30	Ireland	2022 Euro B	Pasian Di Pato Stadium, Udine	500	
19 June 2022	0–60	Wales	2022 Euro B	Pandy Park, Crosskeys	410	
3 June 2023	34–14	Serbia	Friendly	Pasian Di Prato Stadium, Udine		
27 April 2024	6–56	Netherlands	2026 World Cup qualification	Maurizio Quaggia Stadium, Mogliano Veneto		
4 October 2025	28–36	Lebanon	Friendly	Lidcombe Oval, Sydney		

==== Other matches ====
Date	Score	Opponent	Competition	Venue	Attendance	Ref
24 February 2018	4–12	France Est sélection	Friendly	Léo Lagrange Sports Complex, Toulon		

Note: The France Est sélection team in February 2018 was selected from four clubs in the southeast zone: Montpellier, Lyon Villeurbanne, Marseille, and the Provençal XIII.

== See also ==
- Rugby league in Italy
- Italy national rugby league team
