= 2026 Women's Rugby League World Cup statistics =

Rugby league competition statistics

This article lists the statistics for the 2026 Women's Rugby League World Cup which is to be played from 16 October to 15 November 2026. This includes statistical tables for each of the eight participating teams. The team tables are best viewed on a larger screen.

For an explanation of the acronyms and abbreviations are used in the tables, please see the key to acronyms section at the end of this article.

== Tournament statistics ==
As of 9 November 2026, after the fourteenth match (Australia v Fiji).

=== Individual ===
==== Tournament tallies ====
===== Tries =====
Qualification: 2 tries

Rank	Player	Team	Mat	Tries
1	Jaime Chapman	Australia	5	13
2	Stacey Waaka	New Zealand	5	9
3	Abbi Church	Australia	4	8
4	Mackenzie Wiki	New Zealand	4	6
4	Jessica Sergis	Australia	4	6
6	Tahlia Marshall	Fiji	4	5
7	Naomi Kelly	Papua New Guinea	3	4
7	Apii Nicholls	New Zealand	5	4
7	Freedom Crichton Ropati	Samoa	3	4
7	Mele Hufanga	New Zealand	4	4
7	Tamika Upton	Australia	5	4
12	Connie Boyd	England	3	3
12	Anna Davies	England	3	3
12	Tyra Ekepati	Samoa	3	3
12	Mercedez Taulelei-Siala	Samoa	4	3
12	Tia Molo	Papua New Guinea	3	3
12	Olivia Kernick	Australia	5	3
12	Losana Lutu	Fiji	4	3
12	Keilee Joseph	Australia	4	3
12	Kaiyah Atai	New Zealand	5	3
12	Raecene McGregor	New Zealand	5	3
12	Shaylee Bent	Australia	4	3
23	Shellie Long	Papua New Guinea	3	2
24	Fleur Ginn	Papua New Guinea	3	2
23	Isabel Rowe	England	3	2
24	Amelia Brown	England	2	2
23	Destiny Mino-Sinapati	Samoa	4	2
24	Sienna Laing	Fiji	3	2
23	Julia Robinson	Australia	2	2
24	Jocelyn Kelleher	Australia	3	2
23	Isabelle Kelly	Australia	5	2
24	Taina Naividi	Fiji	4	2
23	Tenika Willison	New Zealand	1	2
24	Abigail Roache	New Zealand	2	2
23	Leianne Tufuga	New Zealand	4	2
24	Keeley Nizza	Australia	4	2
23	Paige Travis	Wales	3	2
24	Luisa Yaranamua	Fiji	4	2
23	Maria Paseka	Fiji	3	2

===== Try assists =====
Qualification: 2 try assists

Rank	Player	Team	Mat	Try assists
1	Tamika Upton	Australia	4	13
2	Raecene McGregor	New Zealand	4	9
3	Tarryn Aiken	Australia	4	7
4	Sereana Naitokatoka	Fiji	4	5
5	Stacey Waaka	New Zealand	4	4
5	Jocelyn Kelleher	Australia	3	4
6	Tia Molo	Papua New Guinea	3	3
6	Isabella Waterman	Fiji	4	3
6	Tiana Penitani Gray	Australia	3	3
6	Georgia Wilson	England	2	3
6	Mele Hufanga	New Zealand	3	3
6	Ivana Lolesio	Samoa	4	3
6	Tyra Ekepati	Samoa	3	3
6	Taina Naividi	Fiji	4	3
6	Apii Nicholls	New Zealand	4	3
6	Jesse Southwell	Australia	1	3
16	Anika Butler	Papua New Guinea	3	2
16	Keara Bennett	England	3	2
16	Evania Isa'ako	Samoa	4	2
16	Fran Goldthorp	England	3	2
16	Losana Lutu	Fiji	4	2
16	Kaiyah Atai	New Zealand	4	2
16	Olivia Kernick	Australia	4	2
16	Tayla Preston	Wales	3	2
16	Luisa Yaranamua	Fiji	4	2
16	Jessica Sergis	Australia	3	2

===== Points =====
Qualification: 10 points

Rank	Player	Team	Mat	Tries	Goals	DG	Points
1	Jesse Southwell	Australia	2	1	25	0	54
2	Jaime Chapman	Australia	5	13	0	0	52
3	Jocelyn Kelleher	Australia	3	2	18	0	44
4	Luisa Yaranamua	Fiji	4	2	15	0	38
5	Stacey Waaka	New Zealand	5	9	0	0	36
6	Abbi Church	Australia	4	8	0	0	32
7	Isabel Rowe	England	3	2	10	0	28
7	Chantay Kiria-Ratu	New Zealand	3	1	12	0	28
9	Pauline Piliae-Rasabale	Samoa	4	0	12	0	24
9	Jessica Sergis	Australia	4	6	0	0	24
9	Mackenzie Wiki	New Zealand	4	6	0	0	24
12	Tahlia Marshall	Fiji	4	5	0	0	20
13	Apii Nicholls	New Zealand	5	4	1	0	18
14	Naomi Kelly	Papua New Guinea	3	4	0	0	16
14	Freedom Crichton Ropati	Samoa	3	4	0	0	16
14	Mele Hufanga	New Zealand	4	4	0	0	16
14	Tamika Upton	Australia	5	4	0	0	16
18	Emily Veivers	Papua New Guinea	3	0	7	0	14
18	Zahara Temara	New Zealand	2	0	7	0	14
20	Anna Davies	England	3	3	0	0	12
20	Connie Boyd	England	3	3	0	0	12
20	Tyra Ekepati	Samoa	3	3	0	0	12
20	Mercedez Taulelei-Siala	Samoa	4	3	0	0	12
20	Losana Lutu	Fiji	4	3	0	0	12
20	Tia Molo	Papua New Guinea	3	3	0	0	12
20	Olivia Kernick	Australia	5	3	0	0	12
20	Keilee Joseph	Australia	4	3	0	0	12
20	Raecene McGregor	New Zealand	5	3	0	0	12
20	Kaiyah Atai	New Zealand	5	3	0	0	12
20	Shaylee Bent	Australia	4	3	0	0	12

===== Goal kicking =====
Qualification: 1 attempt

Rank	Player	Team	Mat	Goals	Attempts	%
1	Jesse Southwell	Australia	2	25	27	92.59%
2	Jocelyn Kelleher	Australia	3	18	28	64.29%
3	Luisa Yaranamua	Fiji	4	15	19	78.95%
4	Pauline Piliae-Rasabale	Samoa	4	12	20	60.00%
4	Chantay Kiria-Ratu	New Zealand	3	12	26	46.15%
6	Isabel Rowe	England	3	10	14	71.43%
7	Emily Veivers	Papua New Guinea	3	7	13	53.85%
7	Zahara Temara	New Zealand	2	7	13	53.85%
9	Sereana Naitokatoka	Fiji	4	3	4	75.00%
10	Tayla Preston	Wales	3	2	2	100.00%
11	Apii Nicholls	New Zealand	5	1	1	100.00%
11	Lisa Diraison	France	3	1	2	50.00%

===== Offloads =====
Qualification: 3 offloads

Rank	Player	Team	Mat	Offloads
1	Laikha Clarke	Samoa	4	8
1	Mackenzie Wiki	New Zealand	3	8
3	Amber Hall	Samoa	2	6
3	Stacey Waaka	New Zealand	4	6
3	Olivia Kernick	Australia	4	6
3	Isabelle Kelly	Australia	4	6
7	Annetta Nuuausala	Samoa	4	5
7	Latisha Smythe	Fiji	4	5
7	Leïla Bessahli	France	3	5
7	Jessica Sergis	Australia	3	5
11	Losana Lutu	Fiji	4	4
11	Alexis Tauaneai	New Zealand	4	4
11	Ivana Lauitiiti	New Zealand	4	4
11	Shannon Mato	New Zealand	3	4
11	Mele Hufanga	New Zealand	3	4
11	Taina Naividi	Fiji	4	4
11	Aliti Namoce	Fiji	2	4
18	Sarina Masaga	Samoa	1	3
18	Essay Banu	Papua New Guinea	3	3
18	Tyra Ekepati	Samoa	3	3
18	Manon Samarra	France	3	3
18	Makenzie Weale	Australia	2	3

===== Tackles made =====
Qualification: 50 tackles made

Rank	Player	Team	Mat	Tackles
1	Georgia Hale	New Zealand	4	124
2	Bethan Dainton	Wales	3	115
3	Fanua Rimoni	Samoa	4	105
4	Leilani Wilson	Samoa	4	92
5	Hollie-Mae Dodd	England	3	89
5	Perrine Monsarrat	France	3	89
5	Laikha Clarke	Samoa	4	89
8	Talei Holmes	Fiji	4	88
9	Mary-Jane Taito	Samoa	4	85
10	Latisha Smythe	Fiji	4	83
11	Leilani Ahsam	Fiji	4	78
12	Leïla Bessahli	France	3	75
13	Elisa Akpa	France	3	74
13	Ivana Lolesio	Samoa	4	74
15	India Seeto	Papua New Guinea	3	70
15	Sereana Naitokatoka	Fiji	4	70
15	Shaylee Bent	Australia	3	70
18	Keara Bennett	England	3	69
18	Angelina Teakaraanga-Katoa	New Zealand	4	69
20	Olivia Kernick	Australia	4	68
21	Fanny Ramos	France	3	67
21	Tavarna Papalii	Samoa	3	67
21	Kaiyah Atai	New Zealand	4	67
24	Mary Coleman	England	2	65
25	Lucy Murray	England	2	63
26	Jodie Cunningham	England	3	63
25	Shellie Long	Papua New Guinea	3	63
26	Elizabeth Naleba	Fiji	4	63
25	Millie Elliott	Australia	3	63
30	Paige Travis	Wales	3	62
31	Salomé Ségala	France	3	61
32	Pauline Piliae-Rasabale	Samoa	4	60
33	Carys Marsh	Wales	3	59
34	Shannon Mato	New Zealand	3	59
35	Emily Veivers	Papua New Guinea	3	58
36	Evania Isa'ako	Samoa	4	58
37	Georgia Cussons	Wales	3	56
38	Alexis Tauaneai	New Zealand	4	56
39	Taina Naividi	Fiji	4	55
40	Isabel Rowe	England	3	53
41	Cristina Song Puche	France	2	53
42	Simaima Taufa	Australia	3	52
43	Georgia Roche	England	3	51
44	Therese Aiton	Papua New Guinea	2	50
45	Olivia Higgins	Australia	3	50

==== Match records ====
===== Try hattricks =====
Qualification: 3 tries in a match

Player	Team	Tries	Times	Date	Round	Opponent	Venue	Ref
Jaime Chapman	Australia	6	7' 10' 26' 42' 64' 69'	1 Nov 2026	3	Wales	CommBank Stadium, Sydney	NRL
Naomi Kelly	Papua New Guinea	4	28' 43' 51' 61'	17 Oct 2026	1	France	Santos National Football Stadium, Port Moresby	NRL
Apii Nicholls	New Zealand	4	4' 10' 61' 69'	25 Oct 2026	2	France	One NZ Stadium, Christchurch	NRL
Jessica Sergis	Australia	4	19' 29' 38' 53'	1 Nov 2026	3	Wales	CommBank Stadium, Sydney	NRL
Abbi Church	Australia	4	24' 39' 50' 66'	8 Nov 2026	SF	Fiji	Allianz Stadium, Sydney	NRL
Connie Boyd	England	3	16' 21' 63'	17 Oct 2026	1	Wales	HBF Park, Perth	NRL
Anna Davies	England	3	26' 67' 69'	17 Oct 2026	1	Wales	HBF Park, Perth	NRL
Tyra Ekepati	Samoa	3	10' 21' 65'	23 Oct 2026	2	Wales	CommBank Stadium, Sydney	NRL
Tahlia Marshall	Fiji	3	33' 40' 44'	24 Oct 2026	2	Papua New Guinea	Santos National Football Stadium, Port Moresby	NRL
Mele Hufanga	New Zealand	3	25' 32' 35'	25 Oct 2026	2	France	One NZ Stadium, Christchurch	NRL
Stacey Waaka	New Zealand	3	22' 28' 52'	25 Oct 2026	2	France	One NZ Stadium, Christchurch	NRL
Freedom Crichton Ropati	Samoa	3	8' 17' 29'	30 Oct 2026	3	England	WIN Stadium, Wollongong	NRL
Stacey Waaka	New Zealand	3	24' 43' 63'	7 Nov 2026	SF	Samoa	McDonald Jones Stadium, Newcastle	NRL
Jaime Chapman	Australia	3	2' 14' 28'	15 Nov 2026	F	New Zealand	Suncorp Stadium, Brisbane	NRL

===== Goals in a match =====
Qualification: 5 goals in a match

Player	Team	Goals	Times	Missed	Date	Round	Opponent	Venue	Ref
Jesse Southwell	Australia	20	7' 9' 11' 16' 18' 21' 24' 28' 30' 33' 37' 40' 43' 46' 54' 56' 63' 65' 69' 69'	51'	1 Nov 2026	3	Wales	CommBank Stadium, Sydney	NRL
Pauline Piliae-Rasabale	Samoa	10	10' 12' 22' 27' 32' 34' 46' 51' 67' 69'	16' 43' 53' 59'	23 Oct 2026	2	Wales	CommBank Stadium	NRL
Isabel Rowe	England	9	4' 18' 20' 23' 27' 34' 48' 57' 69'	15' 38' 64' 68'	17 Oct 2026	1	Wales	HBF Park, Perth	NRL
Jocelyn Kelleher	Australia	9	7' 13' 16' 26' 38' 41' 45' 52' 54'	4' 23' 28' 48' 66' 68'	24 Oct 2026	2	England	HBF Park, Perth	NRL
Chantay Kiria-Ratu	New Zealand	9	5' 11' 20' 27' 34' 37' 41' 43' 62'	2' 9' 24' 30' 47' 50' 53' 59'	25 Oct 2026	2	France	One NZ Stadium, Christchurch	NRL
Luisa Yaranamua	Fiji	7	21' 26' 41' 46' 52' 55' 65'	4' 28'	31 Oct 2026	3	France	Cbus Stadium, Gold Coast	NRL
Jocelyn Kelleher	Australia	6	12' 18' 27' 34' 46' 68'	23'	16 Oct 2026	1	Samoa	CommBank Stadium, Sydney	NRL
Emily Veivers	Papua New Guinea	5	8' 19' 22' 29' 47'	25' 34' 45' 50' 52'	17 Oct 2026	1	France	Santos National Football Stadium, Port Moresby	NRL
Jesse Southwell	Australia	5	3' 6' 15' 20' 34'	29'	15 Nov 2026	F	New Zealand	Suncorp Stadium, Brisbane	NRL

== Injuries ==
The following injuries were incurred after the respective squads assembled and began training.

Player	Team	Type	Occurred			Impact	Replacement	Ref
Player	Team	Type	Where	Left Field	Date	Impact	Replacement	Ref
Shanice Parker	New Zealand	Calf	Training	—	15 Oct 2026	Out of tournament	Mackenzie Wiki	
Taliah Fuimaono	Samoa	Shoulder	In game	39'	16 Oct 2026	Out of tournament	Amanii Misa	
Sarina Masaga	Samoa	Achilles	In game	66'	16 Oct 2026	Out of tournament	Anastasia Leatupue	
Tamika Jones	Fiji	Shoulder	In game	37'	18 Oct 2026	Out of tournament	Keilani Manu	
Maria Paseka	Fiji	Leg	In game	35'	18 Oct 2026	Withdrawn from Round 2	Round 3 return	
Jasmin Strange	England	Knee	Training	—	21-22 Oct 2026	Out of tournament		
Jasmine Gibbons	Wales	Concussion	In game	56'	23 Oct 2026	Missing Round 3		
Belinda Gwasamun	Papua New Guinea		In game	15'	24 Oct 2026	Missing Round 3		
Julia Robinson	Australia	Wrist	In game	19'	24 Oct 2026	Out of tournament	Sheridan Gallagher	
Eva Hunter	England	Leg	In game	26'	24 Oct 2026	Missing Round 3		
Jodie Cunningham	England	Ear	In game	—	24 Oct 2026	Treated in hospital	Round 3 return	
Camille Boudaud	France	Knee	In game	58'	31 Oct 2026	Unable to finish	—	

== Pool A squad statistics ==
=== Australia ===
Coach: Jess Skinner

The Australian Jillaroos squad for the cup was announced on 5 October 2026. Isabelle Kelly was appointed captain.

Players are listed in positional order in line with team selection for the Final against New Zealand.

Player	Age	Position(s)	Tournament					Jillaroos Career						Club Competitions
Player	Age	Position(s)	Tournament					Jillaroos Career						2026 Club	Matches
Player	Age	Position(s)	M	T	G	F	P	Dbt	M	T	G	F	P	2026 Club	T1	T2
Tamika Upton	29	Fullback	5	4	0	0	16	2023	13	18	0	0	72	Broncos	64	20
Jaime Chapman	24	Wing, Centre	5	13	0	0	52	2022	10	18	0	0	72	Titans	47	26
Jessica Sergis	29	Centre	4	6	0	0	24	2019	18	23	0	0	92	Roosters	59	20
Isabelle Kelly	30	Centre	5	2	0	0	8	2017	25	21	0	0	84	Roosters	68	39
Abbi Church	28	Wing, Fullback	4	8	0	0	32	2025	5	9	0	0	36	Eels	48	29
Jesse Southwell	21	Five-eighth, Halfback	2	1	25	0	54	2025	5	1	40	0	84	Broncos	54	12
Tarryn Aiken	27	Halfback	5	1	0	0	4	2022	15	7	23	0	74	Roosters	56	20
Millie Elliott	28	Prop	4	0	0	0	0	2019	8	0	0	0	0	Roosters	51	10
Olivia Higgins	34	Hooker	4	0	0	0	0	2024	9	0	0	0	0	Knights	59	37
Simaima Taufa	32	Prop, Lock	4	0	0	0	0	2014	22	0	0	0	0	Raiders	59	56
Tiana Penitani Gray	30	Second-row, Centre	4	1	0	0	4	2019	12	5	0	0	20	Sharks	56	0
Shaylee Bent	26	Second-row	4	3	0	0	12	2022	8	4	0	0	16	Tigers	63	52
Olivia Kernick	25	Lock, Second-row	5	3	0	0	12	2022	15	7	0	0	28	Roosters	60	30
Keeley Nizza	26	Hooker	4	2	0	0	8	2018	13	3	0	0	12	Roosters	69	0
Keilee Joseph	24	Lock, Prop	4	3	0	0	12	2022	13	5	0	0	20	Eels	53	30
Kezie Apps	35	Second-row	4	1	0	0	4	2014	26	4	0	0	16	Tigers	50	19
Sariah Paki	24	Second-row, Centre	4	1	0	0	4	2026	4	1	0	0	4	Roosters	13	0
Sheridan Gallagher	24	Fullback, Wing	1	0	0	0	0	2026	1	0	0	0	0	Raiders	45	8
Sarah Togatuki	28	Prop, Lock	2	0	0	0	0	2024	7	0	0	0	0	Tigers	58	46
Quincy Dodd	26	Hooker	2	1	0	0	4	2024	7	2	0	0	8	Sharks	55	46
Jocelyn Kelleher	26	Five-eighth	3	2	18	0	44	2026	3	2	18	0	44	Roosters	64	42
Ellie Johnston	25	Prop	2	0	0	0	0	2025	5	1	0	0	4	Sharks	58	36
Makenzie Weale	24	Lock, Prop	2	1	0	0	4	2026	2	1	0	0	4	Cowboys	35	28
Julia Robinson	28	Centre, Wing	2	2	0	0	8	2018	15	24	0	0	96	Broncos	60	17

Notes:

- Two members of the squad have previously played for other nations:
  - Samoa : Sarah Togatuki (in 2019).
  - Tonga : Tiana Penitani Gray (in 2023, having played for Australia in 2019).
- Apart from Sariah Paki, all members of the squad have played Women's State of Origin.
  - NSW (17): Apps (20 matches), Bent (4), Chapman (11), Church (6), Dodd (5), Elliott (12), Higgins (6), Johnston (6), Kelleher (6), Kelly (19), Kernick (12), Davis (13), Penitani (12), Sergis (16), Southwell (8), Taufa (12), and Togatuki (11).
  - Queensland (5): Aiken (11), Joseph (9), Robinson (12), Upton (12), and Weale (9).

=== England ===
Coach: Stuart Barrow

The England squad was announced on 28 September 2026.

Players are listed in positional order in line with team selection for the Round 3 match against Samoa.

Player	Age	Position(s)	Tournament					England Career						Club Competitions
Player	Age	Position(s)	Tournament					England Career						2026 Club	Matches
Player	Age	Position(s)	M	T	G	F	P	Dbt	M	T	G	F	P	2026 Club	T1	T2
Francesca Goldthorp	23	Fullback	3	0	0	0	0	2021	11	7	0	0	28	Cowboys	49	5
Anna Davies	31	Wing	3	3	0	0	12	2024	8	12	0	0	48	Warriors	58	19
Georgia Wilson	29	Centre	2	1	0	0	4	2019	8	4	0	0	16	Warriors	42	14
Connie Boyd	20	Centre	3	3	0	0	12	2026	3	3	0	0	12	Rhinos	24	8
Evie Cousins	21	Wing	1	1	0	0	4	2026	2	1	0	0	4	Rhinos	31	7
Isabel Rowe	19	Stand-off	3	2	10	0	28	2024	7	3	38	0	88	Warriors	43	12
Georgia Roche	26	Scrum-half	3	0	0	0	0	2018	16	8	0	0	32	Knights	49	4
Mary Coleman	28	Prop	2	0	0	0	0	2026	3	0	0	0	0	Warriors	57	20
Keara Bennett	24	Hooker	3	0	0	0	0	2022	13	1	0	0	4	Rhinos	56	17
Olivia Wood	25	Prop	2	0	0	0	0	2022	13	2	0	0	8	Valkyrie	56	19
Lucy Murray	23	Second-row	2	0	0	0	0	2025	4	3	0	0	12	Rhinos	49	16
Hollie-Mae Dodd	23	Second-row, Prop	3	1	0	0	4	2021	14	9	0	0	36	Raiders	45	4
Megan Williams	21	Loose forward	3	0	0	0	0	2026	4	0	0	0	0	Warriors	37	4
Jodie Cunningham	34	Loose forward	3	0	0	0	0	2009	38	10	0	0	40	St Helens	54	23
Victoria Whitfield	30	Prop	3	0	0	0	0	2018	17	1	0	0	4	St Helens	59	21
Hope Millard	21	Prop	2	0	0	0	0	2026	2	0	0	0	0	Bulldogs	17	15
Lucie Sams	20	Prop	2	0	0	0	0	2026	2	0	0	0	0	Warriors	15	6
Jenna Foubister	19	Scrum-half	2	0	0	0	0	2025	4	2	0	0	8	Warriors	35	11
Ruby Bruce	19	Hooker	0	0	0	0	0	2025	2	0	0	0	0	Rhinos	33	8
Amelia Brown	22	Wing	2	2	0	0	8	2024	3	5	0	0	20	Giants	52	16
Molly Jones	22	Centre	1	0	0	0	0	2025	2	1	0	0	4	Warriors	45	14
Jasmin Strange	23	Second-row	1	1	0	0	4	2026	1	1	0	0	4	Roosters	49	19
Eva Hunter	21	Second-row	2	0	0	0	0	2025	4	3	0	0	12	Warriors	49	13

Notes:

- The squad included two heritage players who had played only in the NRL Women's Premiership and the underlying state competitions.
  - Hope Millard (NRLW 17 matches, NSW 15 club matches).
  - Jasmin Strange (NRLW 49 matches, NSW 19 club matches).
- Three players who had debuted for clubs in England had played in the 2026 NRL Women's season.
  - Hollie-Mae Dodd (NRLW 33, SL 12, Cup 4 matches).
  - Francesca Goldthorp (NRLW 39 matches, SL 10, Cup 5 matches).
  - Georgia Roche (NRLW 42 matches, SL 7, Cup 4 matches).
- For the 18 players selected from teams based in England, club match numbers reflect appearances since 2023 in the RFL Women's Super League (T1) and Women's Challenge Cup (T2).

=== Samoa ===
Coach: Frank Pritchard

The Fetu Samoa squad was announced on 6 October 2026.

Players are listed in positional order in line with team selection for the Semi -Final match against New Zealand.

Player	Age	Position(s)	Tournament					Fetu Samoa Career						Club Competitions
Player	Age	Position(s)	Tournament					Fetu Samoa Career						2026 Club	Matches
Player	Age	Position(s)	M	T	G	F	P	Dbt	M	T	G	F	P	2026 Club	T1	T2
Destiny Mino-Sinapati	21	Fullback	4	2	0	0	8	2023	7	3	0	0	12	Titans	17
Mercedez Taulelei-Siala	20	Wing	4	3	0	0	12	2024	8	4	0	0	16	Knights	13	11
Monica Tagoai	28	Centre	4	1	0	0	4	2026	4	1	0	0	4	Bulldogs	18	0
Tyra Ekepati	19	Centre	3	3	0	0	12	2026	3	3	0	0	12	Dragons	13	15
Anastasia Leatupue	18	Wing	1	0	0	0	0	2026	1	0	0	0	0	Roosters	0	7
Evania Isa'ako	31	Five-eighth, Second-row	4	1	0	0	4	2024	6	1	0	0	4	Titans	45	0
Pauline Piliae-Rasabale	34	Halfback	4	0	10	0	20	2023	9	0	25	0	50	Titans	25	24
Annetta Nu'uausala	31	Prop, Second-row	4	0	0	0	0	2023	10	3	0	0	12	Warriors	44	11
Mary-Jane Taito	18	Hooker	4	0	0	0	0	2026	4	0	0	0	0	Bulldogs	11	1
Laikha Clarke	25	Prop	4	1	0	0	4	2024	8	1	0	0	4	Titans	41	19
Leilani Wilson	23	Second-row, Lock	4	0	0	0	0	2026	4	0	0	0	0	Bulldogs	11	33
Ivana Lolesio	22	Second-row	4	1	0	0	4	2026	4	1	0	0	4	Titans	24	7
Fanua Rimoni	19	Lock, Prop	4	1	0	0	4	2026	4	1	0	0	4	Titans	9	1
Tavarna Papalii	21	Lock	3	1	0	0	4	2024	8	2	0	0	8	Broncos	9	14
Christabelle Onesemo-Tuilaepa	22	Prop	3	0	0	0	0	2026	3	0	0	0	0	Warriors	7	0
Jasmine Solia	29	Second-row, Lock	2	0	0	0	0	2024	3	2	0	0	8	Titans	32	4
Christian Pio	26	Prop, Second-row	1	0	0	0	0	2024	4	0	0	0	0	Tigers	45	54
Jaydika Tafua	20	Second-row	1	0	0	0	0	2025	2	0	0	0	0	Sharks	16	11
Evelyn Roberts	18	Hooker	1	0	0	0	0	2026	1	0	0	0	0	Bulldogs	9	13
Jetaya Faifua	23	Five-eighth, Fullback	2	0	0	0	0	2024	7	1	0	0	4	Tigers	31	31
Freedom Crichton Ropati	18	Wing	3	4	0	0	16	2026	3	4	0	0	16	Eels	1	9
Amanii Misa	19	Prop, Second-row	0	0	0	0	0	—	0	0	0	0	0	Broncos	0	17
Amber Hall	31	Second-row, Prop	2	1	0	0	4	2026	2	1	0	0	4	Roosters	49	2
Taliah Fuimaono	27	Five-eighth	1	0	0	0	0	2019	4	0	0	0	0	Dragons	36	40
Sarina Masaga	21	Centre	1	0	0	0	0	2024	6	3	0	0	12	Titans	17	8

Notes

- All 23 players initially selected had played in the 2026 NRL Women's season.
- Five members of the squad have previously played for another nation:
  - Australia (2): Fuimaono (3 matches) and Isa'ako (4).
  - New Zealand (3): Hall (14), Nu'uausala (14), and Jasmine Fogavini (Solia) (3).
- Five members of the squad have played Women's State of Origin.
  - Queensland (4): Brill (11 matches), Isa'ako (6), Lolesio (3), and Papalii (3).
  - NSW (1): Fuimaono (5).
- Anastasia Leatupue replaced the injured Sarina Masaga between Rounds 1 and 2. Leatupue was on a development contract with the Sydney Roosters for the 2026 season, but did not play an NRLW game. Leatupue did play seven matches for the Central Coast Roosters in the 2026 NSWRL Women's Premiership season.

=== Wales ===
Coach: Tom Brindle

The Wales squad was announced on 28 September 2026. Bethan Dainton was appointed captain.

Players are listed in positional order in line with team selection for the Round 3 match against Australia.

Player	Age	Position(s)	Tournament					Wales Career						Club Competitions
Player	Age	Position(s)	Tournament					Wales Career						2026 Club	Matches
Player	Age	Position(s)	M	T	G	F	P	Dbt	M	T	G	F	P	2026 Club	T1	T2
Leanne Burnell	33	Fullback	3	0	0	0	0	2021	11	5	2	0	24	Cardiff Demons	0	8
Zoe Heeley	28	Wing, Centre	3	0	0	0	0	2026	4	0	0	0	0	Cardiff Demons	0	12
Jade Mullen	34	Centre, Scrum-half	2	0	0	0	0	2026	3	0	0	0	0	London Broncos	1	2
Hannah Bluck	32	Centre, Wing	3	0	0	0	0	2026	3	0	0	0	0	Cardiff Demons	0	0
Sian Williams	22	Wing	2	0	0	0	0	2026	2	0	0	0	0	Cowboys	3	17
Ffion Lewis	30	Stand-off, Scrum-half	2	0	0	0	0	2021	5	3	0	0	12	London Broncos	1	0
Tayla Preston	27	Scrum-half	3	0	2	0	4	2026	3	0	2	0	4	Bulldogs	48	45
Agnes Wood	27	Prop	3	0	0	0	0	2024	9	1	0	0	4	Valkyrie	27	4
Carys Marsh	29	Hooker	3	0	0	0	0	2021	14	1	0	0	4	Warriors	53	18
Emily Hughes	31	Prop, Second-row	3	0	0	0	0	2021	10	1	0	0	4	London Broncos	1	7
Georgia Cussons	30	Second-row	3	0	0	0	0	2023	11	2	0	0	8	Giants	0	11
Paige Travis	27	Second-row, Lock	3	2	0	0	8	2026	3	2	0	0	8	St Helens	53	18
Bethan Dainton	37	Loose forward	3	0	0	0	0	2022	12	4	0	0	16	Warriors	40	19
Kathryn Salter	31	Fullback	3	0	0	0	0	2021	14	3	20	0	52	London Broncos	1	10
Erin Williams	23	Second-row	3	0	0	0	0	2026	3	0	0	0	0	Cardiff Demons	0	0
Gracie Hobbs	24	Prop	2	0	0	0	0	2024	6	0	0	0	0	Giants	37	7
Lucia Davies	23	Centre	1	0	0	0	0	2024	5	1	0	0	4	Cardiff Demons	0	6
Danielle McGifford	31	Wing	1	0	0	0	0	2024	5	1	0	0	4	St Helens	33	10
Amberley Ruck	32	Stand-off	1	0	0	0	0	2021	8	1	2	0	8	Cardiff Demons	0	7
Frances Layton	26	Wing	1	0	0	0	0	2026	2	0	0	0	0	Cardiff Demons	1	4
Hollie Brussels	21	Halfback, Hooker	0	0	0	0	0	—	0	0	0	0	0	Warrington Wolves	7	0
Katie Carr	24	Prop	1	0	0	0	0	2022	9	0	0	0	0	Cardiff Demons	0	9
Jasmine Gibbons	25	Hooker, Centre	2	0	0	0	0	2023	10	0	0	0	0	Cardiff Demons	0	11

Notes:

- The squad included two heritage players who had played only in the NRL Women's Premiership and the underlying state competitions.
  - Tayla Preston (NRLW 48 matches, NSW 45 club matches.
  - Sian Williams (NRLW 3 matches, Queensland 17 club matches.
- For the 21 players selected from the Cardiff Demons or teams based in England, club match numbers reflect appearances since 2023 in the RFL Women's Super League (T1) and Women's Challenge Cup (T2).

== Pool B squad statistics ==
=== Fiji ===
Coach: Jone Wesele

The Fiji squad was announced via social media on 7 October 2026. The squad list was published on the NRL website on the same day.

Players are listed in positional order in line with team selection for the Semi-Final match against Australia.

Player	Age	Position(s)	Tournament					Fiji Bulikula Career						Club Competitions
Player	Age	Position(s)	Tournament					Fiji Bulikula Career						2026 Club	Matches
Player	Age	Position(s)	M	T	G	F	P	Dbt	M	T	G	F	P	2026 Club	T1	T2
Cassie Staples	34	Fullback	4	1	0	0	4	2023	9	6	0	0	24	Sharks	40	12
Maria Paseka	20	Wing	3	2	0	0	8	2025	5	6	0	0	24	Dragons	15	15
Isabella Waterman	26	Centre	4	0	0	0	0	2025	6	2	1	0	10	Raiders	17	13
Sienna Laing	19	Centre, Wing	3	2	0	0	8	2023	8	4	0	0	16	Bears	0	29
Taina Naividi	25	Wing, Centre, Hooker	4	2	0	0	8	2024	6	2	0	0	8	Roosters	31	15
Luisa Yaranamua	23	Five-eighth	4	2	15	0	38	2024	8	2	27	0	62	Rabbitohs	0	39
Losana Lutu	22	Halfback	4	3	0	0	12	2024	6	3	0	0	12	Tigers	26	7
Latisha Smythe	22	Prop	4	1	0	0	4	2024	8	1	0	0	4	Bulldogs	16	16
Sereana Naitokatoka	25	Hooker	4	0	3	0	6	2019	10	0	7	0	14	Raiders	29	46
Lorren Ieli	19	Prop	4	1	0	0	4	2026	4	1	0	0	4	Titans	0	24
Elizabeth Naleba	—	Second-row	4	0	0	0	0	2025	6	0	0	0	0	Bears	0	23
Talei Holmes	26	Second-row, Lock	4	0	0	0	0	2019	8	1	0	0	4	Sharks	46	44
Leilani Ahsam	20	Lock, Prop	4	1	0	0	4	2025	6	4	0	0	16	Sharks	0	24
Tahlia Marshall	22	Wing, Five-eighth	4	5	0	0	20	2025	6	8	0	0	32	Tigers	0	33
Teaghan Hartigan	30	Lock	3	0	0	0	0	2019	9	1	0	0	4	Bears	2	31
Ema Masi	30	Second-row	2	0	0	0	0	2026	2	0	0	0	0	Devils	0	16
Aliti Namoce	28	Second-row, Prop	2	1	0	0	4	2023	4	2	0	0	8	Rabbitohs	8	48
Nanise Vakacavu	21	Prop	2	0	0	0	0	2024	4	0	0	0	0	Sharks	0	16
Naomi Tegu	—	Prop	2	0	0	0	0	2025	4	1	0	0	4	USP Raiders	0	0
Abigayle Sekitoga	22	Wing	1	0	0	0	0	2024	3	1	0	0	4	Bears	0	15
Rory Muller	—	Hooker	1	0	0	0	0	2024	4	0	0	0	0	Rabbitohs	0	14
Ebony Laing	—	Prop	0	0	0	0	0	2025	2	1	0	0	4	Bears	0	24
Keilani Manu	—	Lock, Second-row	1	0	0	0	0	2025	3	1	0	0	4	Rabbitohs	0	12
Tamika Jones	23	Second-row	1	0	0	0	0	2026	1	0	0	0	0	Bulldogs	8	0

Notes

- Nine members of the squad played in the 2026 NRL Women's season: Holmes (4 matches), Jones (8), Lutu (9), Naitokatoka (1), Naividi (9), Paseka (10), Smythe (9), Staples (10), and Waterman (9). Five of the nine also played matches in the underlying reserve grade competitions.
- Sereana Naitokatoka made 10 appearances for Mounties in the NRL Women's Premiership and was player of the match in the Grand Final.
- Leilani Ahsam was contracted to the Cronulla Sharks but did not make an NRLW appearance in 2026.
- Thirteen members of the squad played in the second-tier state (or reserve grade) competitions during the 2026 season:
  - NSWRL Women's Premiership (5): Ahsam (8 matches), Muller (9), Namoce (9), Vakacavu (4), and Yaranamua (13).
  - QRL Women's Premiership (8): Hartigan (12), Ieli (11), Ebony Laing (10), Sienna Laing (14), Marshall (10), Masi (11), Naleba (14), and Sekitoga (12).
- One member of the squad, Naomi Tegu, played in the Fiji women’s competition in 2026.
- Keilani Manu replaced the injured Tamika Jones between Rounds 1 & 2. Manu played two matches for the South Sydney Rabbitohs in the 2026 NSWRL Women's Premiership season. Manu had played ten matches in the 2025 season, and seven matches each in the 2025 and 2026 Under 19 Tarsha Gale Cup seasons.

=== France ===
Coach: Alan Walsh

The France squad was announced via social media on 4 October 2026.

Players are listed in positional order in line with team selection for the Round 3 match against Fiji.

Player	Age	Position(s)	Tournament					France Career						Club Competitions
Player	Age	Position(s)	Tournament					France Career						2026 Club	Matches
Player	Age	Position(s)	M	T	G	F	P	Dbt	M	T	G	F	P	2026 Club	T1	T2
Manon Samarra	34	Fullback	3	1	0	0	4	2017	20	6	0	0	24	Lescure-Arthes	0	0
Margot Canal	27	Wing, Centre	3	0	0	0	0	2022	12	5	0	0	20	St-Estève XIII Catalan	1	2
Mélissa Medina	—	Centre	3	0	0	0	0	2025	5	2	0	0	8	Lescure-Arthes	0	0
Perle Ramazeilles	30	Centre, Wing	3	0	0	0	0	2023	10	6	0	0	24	Lescure-Arthes	0	0
Haoua Kessely	38	Wing, Prop	2	0	0	0	0	2024	5	6	0	0	24	AS Ayguesvives	0	0
Camille Boudaud	32	Stand-off	3	0	0	0	0	2026	5	0	0	0	0	Lescure-Arthes	0	0
Lisa Diraison	—	Scrum-half	3	0	1	0	2	2024	8	0	19	0	38	Lescure-Arthes	0	0
Elisa Akpa	35	Prop	3	0	0	0	0	2018	16	1	0	0	4	St-Estève XIII Catalan	12	3
Cristina Song-Puche	37	Hooker, Centre	2	0	0	0	0	2016	12	6	0	0	24	St-Estève XIII Catalan	4	2
Élodie Pacull	35	Prop, Loose forward	3	0	0	0	0	2021	11	0	0	0	0	Lescure-Arthes	0	0
Perrine Monsarrat	27	Second-row	3	0	0	0	0	2017	13	1	0	0	4	Lescure-Arthes	0	11
Stecy Bessiere	19	Second-row	3	1	0	0	4	2023	9	1	0	0	4	Lescure-Arthes	0	0
Leïla Bessahli	29	Prop, Loose forward	3	0	0	0	0	2017	16	1	0	0	4	St-Estève XIII Catalan	3	1
Fanny Ramos	31	Hooker	3	0	0	0	0	2017	15	5	0	0	20	St-Estève XIII Catalan	0	2
Salomé Ségala	28	Second-row, Prop	3	0	0	0	0	2023	12	0	0	0	0	Lescure-Arthes	0	0
Louisa Tooman	23	Prop	1	0	0	0	0	2026	2	0	0	0	0	Lescure-Arthes	0	0
Justine Roses	23	Stand-off	2	0	0	0	0	2023	9	3	0	0	12	St-Estève XIII Catalan	0	0
Tessa Benmalek	—	interchange	0	0	0	0	0	2026	1	0	0	0	0	St-Estève XIII Catalan	8	2
Amael Vilanove	25	Centre	1	0	0	0	0	2024	7	6	0	0	24	AS Ayguesvives	0	0
Noémie Samuel	—	Hooker	1	0	0	0	0	2024	5	0	0	0	0	Lescure-Arthes	0	0
Chahrazad Himoudi	26	Wing	0	0	0	0	0	2018	5	3	0	0	12	Lescure-Arthes	0	0
Tallis Eranossian (née Kuresa)	31	Loose forward	2	0	0	0	0	2021	12	0	0	0	0	RC Bègles XIII	0	0
Sarah-Louise Vernay	—	Prop	0	0	0	0	0	2026	1	0	0	0	0	St-Estève XIII Catalan	0	0

Notes

- Numbers in the club matches column reflect appearances since 2023 in the RFL Women's Super League (T1) and Women's Challenge Cup (T2). An exception is Perrine Monsarrat, who has previously played eleven matches in the NSWRL Women's Premiership and QRL Women's Premiership.
- Appearance numbers in the French competition are not available.

=== New Zealand ===
Coach: Ricky Henry

The Kiwi Ferns squad was announced on 6 October 2026. Georgia Hale and Raecene McGregor were appointed joint captains.

Players are listed in positional order in line with team selection for Final against Australia.

Player	Age	Position(s)	Tournament					Kiwi Ferns Career						Club Competitions
Player	Age	Position(s)	Tournament					Kiwi Ferns Career						2026 Club	Matches
Player	Age	Position(s)	M	T	G	F	P	Dbt	M	T	G	F	P	2026 Club	T1	T2
Apii Nicholls	33	Fullback	5	4	1	0	18	2017	24	9	7	0	50	Warriors	46	0
Leianne Tufuga	24	Wing, Centre	4	2	0	0	8	2023	11	6	0	0	24	Raiders	52	30
Mele Hufanga	32	Centre	4	4	0	0	16	2022	17	11	0	0	44	Warriors	40	0
Stacey Waaka	31	Centre, Wing	5	9	0	0	36	2026	5	9	0	0	36	Warriors	16	0
Mackenzie Wiki	25	Wing, Centre	4	6	0	0	24	2024	5	9	0	0	36	Raiders	36
Chantay Kiria-Ratu	22	Five-eighth, Halfback	3	1	12	0	28	2026	3	1	12	0	28	Sharks	33	18
Raecene McGregor	29	Halfback	5	3	0	0	12	2017	23	12	5	0	58	Tigers	60	46
Alexis Tauaneai	21	Prop, Lock	5	0	0	0	0	2024	11	1	0	0	4	Bulldogs	35	5
Georgia Hale	31	Hooker, Lock	5	0	0	0	0	2015	29	0	0	0	0	Titans	62	16
Otesa Pule	23	Prop, Second-row	4	1	0	0	4	2022	17	2	0	0	8	Roosters	53	22
Shaniece Monschau	24	Second-row, Prop	4	0	0	0	0	2025	6	0	0	0	0	Tigers	23	10
Kaiyah Atai	25	Second-row, Lock	5	3	0	0	12	2026	5	3	0	0	12	Warriors	19	0
Angelina Teakaraanga-Katoa	24	Lock, Second-row	5	0	0	0	0	2023	14	1	0	0	4	Bulldogs	40	18
Ashleigh Quinlan	31	Five-eighth, Halfback	5	0	0	0	0	2023	13	2	0	0	8	Bulldogs	42	24
Annessa Biddle	24	Second-row, Centre	4	0	0	0	0	2023	12	3	0	0	12	Sharks	32	0
Shannon Mato	28	Prop	4	1	0	0	4	2026	4	1	0	0	4	Broncos	45	19
Ivana Lauitiiti	20	Prop	5	0	0	0	0	2025	8	0	0	0	0	Warriors	13	0
Brooke Anderson	30	Lock, Hooker	2	0	0	0	0	2023	11	0	0	0	0	Dragons	48	15
Zahara Temara	29	Five-eighth, Halfback	2	0	7	0	14	2026	2	0	7	0	14	Raiders	65	29
Brianna Clark	31	Prop	1	0	0	0	0	2022	10	1	7	0	18	Broncos	49	19
Abigail Roache	30	Centre, Five-eighth	2	2	0	0	8	2022	13	5	0	0	20	Cowboys	38	0
Tenika Willison	28	Wing, Centre	1	2	0	0	8	2026	1	2	0	0	8	Knights	31	1
Trinity Tauaneai	19	Lock, Prop	1	0	0	0	0	2026	1	0	0	0	0	Dragons	19	10
Shanice Parker	28	Wing, Centre	0	0	0	0	0	2022	11	3	0	0	12	Knights	58	42

Notes

- All 23 players played in the 2026 NRL Women's season.
- Five members of the squad have previously played for another nation:
  - Australia (2): Mato (9 matches) and Temara (5).
  - Cook Islands (2): Atai (4) and Chantay Kiria-Ratu (4).
  - Samoa (1): Tufuga (1).
- Seven members of the squad have played Women's State of Origin.
  - New South Wales (2): Anderson (1) and Parker (1).
  - Queensland (5): Clark (2), Chantay Kiria-Ratu (3), Mato (8), Pule (3), and Temara (8).

=== Papua New Guinea ===
Coach: Craig Sandercock

The PNG Orchids squad was announced via social media on 7 October 2026. The squad list was published on the NRL website on the same day.

Players are listed in positional order in line with team selection for the Round 3 match against New Zealand.

Player	Age	Position(s)	Tournament					England Career						Club Competitions
Player	Age	Position(s)	Tournament					England Career						2026 Club	Matches
Player	Age	Position(s)	M	T	G	F	P	Dbt	M	T	G	F	P	2026 Club	T1	T2
Anika Butler	26	Fullback	3	0	0	0	0	2022	7	2	0	0	8	Pickers	0	13
Mala Mark	—	Wing	1	0	0	0	0	2017	4	0	0	0	0	Central Dabaris	0	0
Relna Wuruki-Hosea	21	Centre	3	1	0	0	4	2025	4	1	0	0	4	Raiders	6	16
Tia Molo	18	Centre	3	3	0	0	12	2025	5	3	0	0	12	Broncos	0	9
Naomi Kelly	—	Wing	3	4	0	0	16	2025	5	5	0	0	20	Central Dabaris	0	0
Fleur Ginn	20	Five-eighth	3	2	0	0	8	2025	5	2	0	0	8	Eels	15	4
Gemma Schnaubelt	29	Halfback	2	0	0	0	0	2019	4	0	0	0	0	Clydesdales	0	15
Elsie Albert	30	Prop	3	1	0	0	4	2019	15	4	0	0	16	Eels	46	15
Therese Aiton	37	Hooker	2	0	0	0	0	2019	10	1	0	0	4	Clydesdales	2	43
Jenny David	—	Prop	3	0	0	0	0	2026	3	0	0	0	0	Tigers	0	26
Emily Veivers	25	Second-row, Lock	3	0	7	0	14	2022	12	1	15	0	34	Cowboys	2	25
Shellie Long	26	Second-row	3	2	0	0	8	2022	7	3	0	0	12	Pride	11	28
India Seeto	20	Lock	3	0	0	0	0	2025	5	0	0	0	0	Tigers	0	27
Mya Muller	—	Prop	1	0	0	0	0	2025	2	0	0	0	0	Panthers	0	0
Essay Banu	24	Prop	3	0	0	0	0	2022	12	2	0	0	8	Cowboys	30	23
Jafinda Sap	—	Prop	2	0	0	0	0	2026	2	0	0	0	0	Central Dabaris	0	0
Venessa Nakas	—	Second-row	2	0	0	0	0	2026	2	0	0	0	0	Central Dabaris	0	0
Ua Ravu	29	Hooker	2	1	0	0	4	2019	11	3	0	0	12	Rabbitohs	2	5
Jasmine Joe	—	Wing	0	0	0	0	0	—	0	0	0	0	0	Port Moresby Vipers	0	0
Josephine Howard	—	Hooker, Prop	0	0	0	0	0	—	0	0	0	0	0	Central Dabaris	0	0
Cynthiah Peters	—	Halfback	2	0	0	0	0	2026	2	0	0	0	0	Rabaul Gurias	0	0
Ivania Wong	29	Wing	2	1	0	0	4	2026	2	1	0	0	4	— Brumbies	0	0
Belinda Gwasamun	—	Second-row	2	0	0	0	0	2019	14	6	0	0	24	Mt Hagen Eagles	0	15

- In addition to the squad of 23, the following three players were named as development players:
  - Gian Kaupa (prop, Lae Snax Tigers)
  - Jacinta Garry (wing or fullback, Mt. Hagen Eagles)
  - Joyce Hobert (centre, Port Moresby Vipers)
- Eight members of the squad played in the 2026 Santos Cup: Gwasamun (8 matches), Howard (7), Joe (10), Kelly (8), Mark (9), Nakas (10), Peters (5), and Sap (9).
- Five members of the squad played in the 2026 NRL Women's season: Albert (11 matches}, Veivers (2}, Banu (10}, and Ginn (4}.
- Relna Wuruki-Hosea was contracted to the Raiders but did not make an appearance in NRLW 2026. She played nine matches for Mounties in the NSWRL Women's Premiership scoring twelve tries, including a hattrick in the Grand Final.
- Tia Molo was on a development contract with the Broncos during NRLW 2026 but did not make an appearance in that top tier competition. She did play nine matches for Wynnum Manly Seagulls in the QRL Women's Premiership.
- Six members of the squad played in the 2026 QRL Women's Premiership: Aiton (8 matches), Long (7), Molo (9), Seeto (12), Wuruki-Hosea (9), and Gemma Walker (nee Schnaubelt).
- Ua Rava was a member of the South Sydney Rabbitohs 2026 squad, but did not make an appearance in the 2026 NSWRL Women's Premiership.
- Mya Muller played nine matches in a second season of the Under 19 Tarsha Gale Cup in 2026. In two seasons for the Penrith Panthers, Muller played 16 matches.
- Eleven members of the main squad, plus the three development players, appeared for the PNG Prime Minister's XIII in the match on 3 October 2026.

== Key to acronyms ==
The following acronyms and abbreviations are used in the above tables:

- Tournament - Appearance and scoring tallies within the 2026 World Cup. Will be blank until matches are played.
  - M — Matches
  - T — Tries
  - G — Goals
  - F — Field Goals (also known as Drop goals)
  - P — Points
- International Career basic statistics appear under the team moniker - e.g. **Kiwi Ferns Career** for the New Zealand women's team.
  - Dbt — Debut Year. Where a player has played for two or more nations. the year displayed reflects the first appearance foe their current team.
- Club Competitions
  - 2026 Club
  - Where a player's 2026 club is outside the RFL Women's Super League or NRLW it is shaded in the table.
  - Matches - Tally of games played in club competitions
    - T1 — Tier 1 club competitions. The National Rugby League Women's Premiership in Australia / New Zealand and the RFL Women's Super League in England.
    - T2 — Tier 2 club competitions. Matches played between 2021 and 2025 in the NSWRL Women's Premiership and or QRL Women's Premiership.
    - Numbers in **bold** indicate that the player has played all her matches at that tier for their current club.
- Other Representative Matches — An icon and number of matches is used.

== See also ==
- 2026 Women's Rugby League World Cup
- 2026 Women's Rugby League World Cup squads
- 2026 Men's Rugby League World Cup statistics
