= 2026 Women's Rugby League World Cup squads =

This article lists the official squads for the 2026 Women's Rugby League World Cup which was played from 16 October to 15 November 2026.

== Pool A ==
=== Australia ===
Coach: Jess Skinner

The Australian Jillaroos squad for the cup was announced on 5 October 2026. Isabelle Kelly was appointed captain.

Player	Club
Tarryn Aiken	Sydney Roosters
Kezie Apps	Wests Tigers
Shaylee Bent	Wests Tigers
Jaime Chapman	Gold Coast Titans
Abbi Church	Parramatta Eels
Quincy Dodd	Cronulla-Sutherland Sharks
Millie Elliott	Sydney Roosters
Olivia Higgins	Newcastle Knights
Ellie Johnston	Cronulla-Sutherland Sharks
Keilee Joseph	Parramatta Eels
Jocelyn Kelleher	Sydney Roosters
Isabelle Kelly (c)	Sydney Roosters
Olivia Kernick	Sydney Roosters
Keeley Nizza	Sydney Roosters
Sariah Paki	Sydney Roosters
Tiana Penitani Gray	Cronulla-Sutherland Sharks
Julia Robinson	Brisbane Broncos
Jessica Sergis	Sydney Roosters
Jesse Southwell	Brisbane Broncos
Simaima Taufa	Canberra Raiders
Sarah Togatuki	Wests Tigers
Tamika Upton	Brisbane Broncos
Makenzie Weale	North Queensland Cowboys

=== England ===
Coach: Stuart Barrow

The English Lionesses squad was announced on 28 September 2026.

Player	Club
Keara Bennett	(England) Leeds Rhinos
Connie Boyd	(England) Leeds Rhinos
Amelia Brown	(England) Huddersfield Giants
Ruby Bruce	(England) Leeds Rhinos
Mary Coleman	(England) Wigan Warriors
Evie Cousins	(England) Leeds Rhinos
Jodie Cunningham (C)	(England) St Helens
Anna Davies	(England) Wigan Warriors
Hollie-Mae Dodd	(Australia) Canberra Raiders
Jenna Foubister	(England) Wigan Warriors
Fran Goldthorp	(Australia) North Queensland Cowboys
Eva Hunter	(England) Wigan Warriors
Molly Jones	(England) Wigan Warriors
Hope Millard	(Australia) Canterbury-Bankstown Bulldogs
Lucy Murray	(England) Leeds Rhinos
Georgia Roche	(Australia) Newcastle Knights
Isabel Rowe	(England) Wigan Warriors
Lucie Sams	(England) Wigan Warriors
Jasmin Strange	(Australia) Sydney Roosters
Vicky Whitfield	(England) St Helens
Megan Williams	(England) Wigan Warriors
Georgia Wilson	(England) Wigan Warriors
Liv Wood	(England) York Valkyrie

=== Samoa ===
Coach: Frank Pritchard

The Fetū Sāmoa squad was announced on 6 October 2026.

Player	Club
Laikha Clarke	Gold Coast Titans
Freedom Crichton Ropati	Parramatta Eels
Tyra Ekepati	St George Illawarra Dragons
Jetaya Faifua	Wests Tigers
Jasmine Solia	Gold Coast Titans
Taliah Fuimaono	St George Illawarra Dragons
Amber Hall	Sydney Roosters
Evania Isa'ako	Gold Coast Titans
Ivana Lolesio	Gold Coast Titans
Sarina Masaga	Gold Coast Titans
Destiny Mino-Sinapati	Gold Coast Titans
Annetta Nu'uausala	New Zealand Warriors
Christabelle Onesemo-Tuilaepa	New Zealand Warriors
Tavarna Papalii	Brisbane Broncos
Pauline Piliae-Rasabale	Gold Coast Titans
Christian Pio	Wests Tigers
Fanua Rimoni	Gold Coast Titans
Evelyn Roberts	Canterbury-Bankstown Bulldogs
Jaydika Tafua	Cronulla-Sutherland Sharks
Monica Tagoai	Canterbury-Bankstown Bulldogs
Mary-Jane Taito	Canterbury-Bankstown Bulldogs
Mercedez Taulelei-Siala	Newcastle Knights
Leilani Wilson	Canterbury-Bankstown Bulldogs

=== Wales ===
Coach: Tom Brindle

The Welsh Dragons squad was announced on 28 September 2026.

Player	Club
Hannah Bluck	(Wales) Cardiff Demons
Hollie Brussels	(England) Warrington Wolves
Leanne Burnell	(Wales) Cardiff Demons
Katie Carr	(Wales) Cardiff Demons
Georgia Cussions	(England) Huddersfield Giants
Bethan Dainton (C)	(England) Wigan Warriors
Lucia Davies	(Wales) Cardiff Demons
Jasmine Gibbons	(Wales) Cardiff Demons
Zoe Heeley	(Wales) Cardiff Demons
Gracie Hobbs	(England) Huddersfield Giants
Emily Hughes	(England) London Broncos
Frances Layton	(Wales) Cardiff Demons
Ffion Lewis	(England) London Broncos
Carys Marsh	(England) Wigan Warriors
Dani McGifford	(England) St Helens
Jade Mullen	(England) London Broncos
Tayla Preston	(Australia) Canterbury-Bankstown Bulldogs
Amberley Ruck	(Wales) Cardiff Demons
Kathryn Salter	(England) London Broncos
Paige Travis	(England) St Helens
Erin Williams	(Wales) Cardiff Demons
Sian Williams	(Australia) North Queensland Cowboys
Agnes Wood	(England) York Valkyrie

== Pool B ==
=== Fiji ===
Coach: Jone Wesele

The Fiji squad was announced via social media on 7 October 2026. The squad list was published on the NRL website on the same day.

Player	Club
Leilani Ahsam	Cronulla-Sutherland Sharks
Teaghan Hartigan	Burleigh Bears
Talei Holmes	Cronulla-Sutherland Sharks
Lorren Ieli	Gold Coast Titans
Tamika Jones	Canterbury-Bankstown Bulldogs
Ebony Laing	Burleigh Bears
Sienna Laing	Burleigh Bears
Losana Lutu	Wests Tigers
Tahlia Marshall	Brisbane Tigers
Ema Masi	Norths Devils
Rory Muller	South Sydney Rabbitohs
Sereana Naitokatoka	Canberra Raiders
Taina Naividi	Sydney Roosters
Elizabeth Naleba	Burleigh Bears
Aliti Namoce	South Sydney Rabbitohs
Maria Paseka	St George Illawarra Dragons
Abigayle Sekitoga	Burleigh Bears
Latisha Smythe	Canterbury-Bankstown Bulldogs
Cassie Staples	Cronulla-Sutherland Sharks
Naomi Tegu	USP Raiders
Nanise Vakacavu	Cronulla-Sutherland Sharks
Isabella Waterman	Canberra Raiders
Luisa Yaranamua	South Sydney Rabbitohs

=== France ===
Coach: Alan Walsh

The French Chanticleers squad was announced via social media on 4 October 2026. The squad list was published on the NRL website three days later.

Player	Club
Élisa Akpa	Saint-Estève XIII Catalan
Tessa Benmalek	Saint-Estève XIII Catalan
Leïla Bessahli	Saint-Estève XIII Catalan
Stecy Bessière	RC Lescure-Arthes XIII
Camille Boudaud	RC Lescure-Arthes XIII
Margot Canal	Saint-Estève XIII Catalan
Lisa Diraison	RC Lescure-Arthes XIII
Tallis Eranossian	RC Bègles XIII
Chahrazad Himoudi	RC Lescure-Arthes XIII
Haoua Kessely	AS Ayguesvives
Mélissa Médina	RC Lescure-Arthes XIII
Perrine Monsarrat	RC Lescure-Arthes XIII
Élodie Pacull	RC Lescure-Arthes XIII
Perle Ramazeilles	RC Lescure-Arthes XIII
Fanny Ramos	Saint-Estève XIII Catalan
Justine Roses	Saint-Estève XIII Catalan
Manon Samarra	RC Lescure-Arthes XIII
Noémie Samuel	RC Lescure-Arthes XIII
Salomé Ségala	RC Lescure-Arthes XIII
Cristina Song-Puche	Saint-Estève XIII Catalan
Louisa Tooman	RC Lescure-Arthes XIII
Sarah-Louise Vernay	Saint-Estève XIII Catalan
Amaël Vilanove	AS Ayguesvives

=== New Zealand ===
Coach: Ricky Henry

The New Zealand Kiwi Ferns squad was announced on 6 October 2026. Shanice Parker incurred a tournament-ending injury during training on 15 October 2026 and was replaced by Mackenzie Wiki.

Player	Club
Brooke Anderson	St George Illawarra Dragons
Kaiyah Atai	New Zealand Warriors
Annessa Biddle	Cronulla-Sutherland Sharks
Brianna Clark	Brisbane Broncos
Georgia Hale (jc)	Gold Coast Titans
Mele Hufanga	New Zealand Warriors
Chantay Kiria-Ratu	Cronulla-Sutherland Sharks
Ivana Lauitiiti	New Zealand Warriors
Shannon Mato	Brisbane Broncos
Raecene McGregor (jc)	Wests Tigers
Shaniece Monschau	Wests Tigers
Apii Nicholls	New Zealand Warriors
Shanice Parker	Newcastle Knights
Otesa Pule	Sydney Roosters
Ashleigh Quinlan	Canterbury-Bankstown Bulldogs
Abigail Roache	North Queensland Cowboys
Alexis Tauaneai	Canterbury-Bankstown Bulldogs
Trinity Tauaneai	St George Illawarra Dragons
Angelina Teakaraanga-Katoa	Canterbury-Bankstown Bulldogs
Zahara Temara	Canberra Raiders
Leianne Tufuga	Canberra Raiders
Stacey Waaka	New Zealand Warriors
Tenika Willison	Newcastle Knights
Mackenzie Wiki	Canberra Raiders

=== Papua New Guinea ===
Coach: Craig Sandercock

The Papua New Guinean Orchids squad was announced via social media on 7 October 2026. The squad list was published on the NRL website on the same day.

Player	Club
Therese Aiton	Western Clydesdales
Elsie Albert	Parramatta Eels
Essay Banu	North Queensland Cowboys
Anika Butler	Maitland Pickers
Jenny David	Brisbane Tigers
Fleur Ginn	Parramatta Eels
Belinda Gwasamun	Mt Hagen Eagles
Josephine Howard	Central Dabaris
Jasmine Joe	Port Moresby Vipers
Naomi Kelly	Central Dabaris
Shellie Long	Northern Pride
Mala Mark	Central Dabaris
Tia Molo	Brisbane Broncos
Mya Muller	Penrith Panthers
Venessa Nakas	Central Dabaris
Cynthiah Peters	Rabaul Gurias
Ua Ravu	South Sydney Rabbitohs
Jafinda Sap	Central Dabaris
Gemma Schnaubelt	Western Clydesdales
India Seeto	Brisbane Tigers
Emily Veivers	North Queensland Cowboys
Ivania Wong	ACT Brumbies
Relna Wuruki-Hosea	Canberra Raiders

== See also ==
- 2026 Women's Rugby League World Cup statistics
- 2026 Men's Rugby League World Cup squads
- 2026 Wheelchair Rugby League World Cup squads
