= 2026 Women's Rugby League World Cup =

Seventh staging of the Women's Rugby League World Cup

- Number of teams: 8
- Host countries: Australia; Papua New Guinea; New Zealand
- Winner: Australia (4th title)
- Runner-up: New Zealand
- Matches played: 15
- Points scored: 890 (59.33 per match)
- Tries scored: 166 (11.07 per match)
- Top scorer: (Australia) Jesse Southwell (54)
- Top try scorer: (Australia) Jaime Chapman (13)

The 2026 Women's Rugby League World Cup is the seventh staging of the Women's Rugby League World Cup, and is one of three major tournaments that make up the 2026 Rugby League World Cup.

The competition was to be held in during October and November 2025, but was moved to 2026 following the withdrawal of France as hosts nation. The competition ran in parallel with the men's and wheelchair tournaments.

Due to the rescheduling, the competition featured eight teams only. An expansion was planned to double the number of teams for the original 2025 tournament.

== Host selection ==
The International Rugby League (IRL) originally decided in 2016 to have the tournaments hosted in the United States and Canada. In December 2019 however, the IRL withdrew the hosting rights due to the promoters, Moore Sports International, being unable to guarantee the staging of the tournaments.

After re-opening the bidding to host the tournaments, the IRL awarded the hosting rights to France. On 15 May 2023, the France 2025 organising committee was forced to withdraw from hosting the tournament, due to financial concerns from the new French government elected in May 2022.

On 3 August 2023 it was confirmed that the tournament would be moved to 2026 and held in the Southern Hemisphere. On 24 July 2024, the IRL announced that Australia would host the 2026 tournament, with a number of games played in Papua New Guinea.

== Teams ==
=== Qualification ===
On 3 August 2023, the date the tournament was announced, the only qualified teams for the 2026 tournament were the semi-finalists of the 2021 World Cup. The qualification process for the remaining teams was announced 15 December 2023.

Two teams would qualify directly via the European qualifications group stages on 22 June 2024, and one team would qualify directly via the 2024 Women's Pacific Bowl on 2 November 2024.

The 2025 World Series determined the final team to qualify, with one team from each confederation qualifying for the World Series.

Team	Method of qualification	Date of qualification	Total times qualified	Last time qualified	Current consecutive appearances	Previous best performance
England	2021 Group A winners	5 November 2022	4 (Note: Plus two as Great Britain)	2021	4	Semi-finals (2008, 2013, 2017, 2021)
Papua New Guinea	2021 Group A runners-up	5 November 2022	2	2021	2	Semi-finals (2021)
Australia	2021 Group B winners	6 November 2022	6	2021	6	Winners (2013, 2017, 2021)
New Zealand	2021 Group B runners-up	6 November 2022	6	2021	6	Winners (2000, 2003, 2008)
Wales	Europe Group A winners	22 June 2024	1	—N/a	1	First appearance
France	Europe Group B winners	22 June 2024	5	2021	2	Semi-finals (2013)
Samoa	Asia-Pacific winners	2 November 2024	3	2008	1	Fifth-place (2003, 2008)
Fiji	World Series winners	29 October 2025	1	—N/a	1	First appearance

=== Draw ===
The draw was announced on 23 November 2025.

Group A	Group B
Australia England Samoa Wales	Fiji France New Zealand Papua New Guinea

== Venues ==
Venues for the 2026 Women's Rugby League World Cup

Stadium				Location		Games	Capacity
#	Original Name	Sponsored Name	Image	City	Region	Games	Capacity
1	PNG Football Stadium	Santos National Football Stadium		Port Moresby	NCD	2	14,800
2	Te Kaha	One New Zealand Stadium		Christchurch	Canterbury	1	30,000
3	Perth Rectangular Stadium	HBF Park		Perth	WA	2	20,500
4	Lang Park	Suncorp Stadium		Brisbane	QLD	1	52,500
5	Robina Stadium	Cbus Super Stadium		Robina, Gold Coast	QLD	2	27,690
6	Newcastle International Sports Centre	McDonald Jones Stadium		Newcastle	NSW	2	33,000
7	Sydney Football Stadium	Allianz Stadium		Sydney	NSW	1	42,500
8	Western Sydney Stadium	CommBank Stadium		Parramatta, Sydney	NSW	3	30,000
9	Wollongong Showground	WIN Stadium		Wollongong	NSW	1	23,750

== Officiating ==
=== Match officials ===
Match officials were announced on the National Rugby League website, along with team lists, on the Tuesday afternoon preceding matches.

Match Official	Country	Women's tournament appearances			
Match Official	Country	Referee	Touch judge	Video referee	Total
Grant Atkins	Australia	0	0	1	1
Kasey Badger	Australia	3	0	1	4
Izzy Davidson	Australia	0	4	0	4
Jack Feavers	New Zealand	0	2	0	2
Adam Gee	Australia	0	0	1	1
Peter Gough	Australia	0	0	6	6
Tara Jones	England	4	2	0	6
Chris Kendall	England	1	0	0	1
Liam Kennedy	Australia	0	0	1	1
Liam Moore	England	1	0	0	1
Karra-Lee Nolan	Australia	0	6	0	6
Paki Parkinson	New Zealand	0	2	0	2
Geoffrey Poumes	France	0	3	0	3
Belinda Sharpe	Australia	5	0	0	5
Todd Smith	Australia	0	0	4	4
Gerard Sutton	Australia	0	0	1	1
Rochelle Tamarua	New Zealand	1	2	0	3
Dillan Wells	Australia	0	5	0	5
Tori Wilkie	Australia	0	4	0	4

== Rule changes ==
Contrary to the international laws of the game, matches of the 2026 women's world cup were 70 minutes long, matching Australia's domestic competition – the NRLW. This was done to "ensure consistency and familiarity for fans, broadcasters and key tournament stakeholders, as well as coaches and players".

== Group stage ==
=== Group A ===
Pos	Team	Pld	W	D	L	PF	PA	PD	Pts	Qualification
1	Australia (H)	3	3	0	0	242	6	+236	6	Advance to knockout stage
2	Samoa	3	2	0	1	100	46	+54	4	Advance to knockout stage
3	England	3	1	0	2	76	108	−32	2	
4	Wales	3	0	0	3	12	270	−258	0	

Source: Source
(H) Hosts

16 October 2026
20:05 AEDT (UTC+11:00)

Australia	40–0	Samoa
Tries: Chapman 10'; Robinson 17'; Bent 22'; Nizza 26'; Kernick 34'; Joseph 44'; Sergis 67'; Goals: Kelleher (6/7)	1st: 28–0; 2nd: 12–0; Report

Western Sydney Stadium, Sydney
Attendance: 13,174
Referee: Kasey Badger (Australia)
Video referee: Peter Gough (Australia)
Touch judges: Karra-Lee Nolan (Australia), Izzy Davidson (Australia)
Player of the Match: Jocelyn Kelleher (Australia)

Team details
Australia		Position	Samoa
Name	Number	Position	Number	Name
Tamika Upton	1	FB	1	Destiny Mino-Sinapati
Jaime Chapman	2	WG	2	Mercedez Taulelei-Siala
Jessica Sergis	3	CE	3	Monica Tagoai
Isabelle Kelly	4	CE	4	Sarina Masaga
Julia Robinson	5	WG	5	Freedom Crichton-Ropati
Jocelyn Kelleher	6	FE	6	Taliah Fuimaono
Tarryn Aiken	7	HB	7	Pauline Piliae-Rasabale
Millie Elliott	8	PR	8	Annetta Nuuausala
Olivia Higgins	9	HK	9	Mary Jane Taito
Simaima Taufa	10	PF	10	Laikha Clarke
Kezie Apps	11	SR	11	Evania Isa'ako
Shaylee Bent	12	SR	12	Ivana Lolesio
Olivia Kernick	13	LK	13	Leilani Wilson
Keeley Nizza	14	IN	14	Evelyn Roberts
Keilee Joseph	15	IN	15	Fanua Rimoni
Tiana Penitani	16	IN	16	Amber Hall
Ellie Johnston	17	IN	17	Jasmine Fogavini
Makenzie Weale	18	RES	18	Tavarna Papalii
Jess Skinner		Coach		Frank Pritchard

17 October 2026
14:35 AWST (UTC+08:00)

England	70–6	Wales
Tries: Brown 2', 56'; Wilson 13'; Boyd 17', 22', 63'; Dodd 19'; Davies 26', 67', 70'; Rowe 35', 47'; Strange 37'; Goals: Rowe (10/13)	1st: 40–6; 2nd: 30–0; Report	Tries: Travis 9'; Goals: Preston (1/1)

Perth Rectangular Stadium, Perth
Attendance: 7,188
Referee: Tara Jones (England)
Video referee: Peter Gough (Australia)
Touch judges: Tori Wilkie (Australia), Rochelle Tamarua (New Zealand)
Player of the Match: Isabel Rowe

Team details
England		Position	Wales
Name	Number	Position	Number	Name
Francesca Goldthorp	1	FB	1	Leanne Burnell
Anna Davies	2	WG	2	Danielle Mcgifford
Georgia Wilson	3	CE	3	Hannah Bluck
Connie Boyd	4	CE	4	Zoe Heeley
Amelia Brown	5	WG	5	Frances Layton
Isabel Rowe	6	SO	6	Ffion Lewis
Georgia Roche	7	SH	7	Tayla Preston
Mary Coleman	8	PR	8	Agnes Wood
Keara Bennett	9	HK	9	Jasmine Gibbons
Hollie Dodd	10	PF	10	Hughes
Jasmin Strange	11	SR	11	Georgia Cussons
Eva Hunter	12	SR	12	Paige Travis
Megan Williams	13	LF	13	Bethan Dainton
Jodie Cunningham	14	IN	14	Carys Marsh
Victoria Whitfield	15	IN	15	Kathryn Salter
Jenna Foubister	16	IN	16	Katie Carr
Hope Millard	17	IN	17	Erin Williams
Liv Wood	18	RES	18	Jade Mullen
Stuart Barrow		Coach		Thomas Brindle

23 October 2026
17:50 AEDT (UTC+11:00)

Samoa	76–0	Wales
Tries: Clarke 8'; Le Ekepati 10', 21', 65'; Sinapati 14, 49'; Hall 25'; Taulelei-Saila 30, 52'; Lolesio 34'; Isa'ako 44'; Tagoai 45'; Ropate 59'; Papalii 78'; Goals: Piliae (10/14)	1st: 40–0; 2nd: 36–0; Report

Western Sydney Stadium, Sydney
Attendance: 3,991
Referee: Rochelle Tamarua (New Zealand)
Video referee: Peter Gough (Australia)
Touch judges: Tara Jones (England), Geoffrey Poumes (France)
Player of the Match: Amber Hall (Samoa)

Team details
Samoa		Position	Wales
Name	Number	Position	Number	Name
Destiny Sinapati	1	FB	1	Leanne Burnell
Mercedez Taulelei-Saila	2	WG	2	Zoe Heeley
Monica Tagoai	3	CE	3	Jade Mullen
Tyra Le Ekepati	4	CE	4	Hannah Bluck
Freedom Ropati	5	WG	5	Sian Williams
Evania Isa'Ako	6	FE/SO	6	Amberley Ruck
Pauline Piliae	7	HB/SH	7	Tayla Preston
Annetta Nuuausala	8	PR	8	Agnes Wood
Mary Jane Taito	9	HK	9	Jasmine Gibbons
Laikha Clarke	10	PF	10	Emily Hughes
Leilani Wilson	11	SR	11	Georgia Cussons
Ivana Lolesio	12	SR	12	Paige Travis
Tavarna Papalii	13	LK/LF	13	Bethan Dainton
Jetaya Faifua	14	IN	14	Carys Marsh
Fanua Rimoni	15	IN	15	Kathryn Salter
Amber Hall	16	IN	16	Erin Williams
Christabelle Onesome-Tuilaepa	17	IN	17	Gracie Hobbs
Jaydika Tafua	18	RES	18	Katie Carr
Frank Pritchard		Coach		Thomas Brindle

24 October 2026
17:05 AWST (UTC+08:00)

Australia	78–0	England
Tries: Chapman 2', 5'; Kelleher 12', 21'; Robinson 15'; Kelly 25', 64'; Church 27', 46'; Aiken 37'; Kernick 39'; Dodd 44'; Weale 50'; Penitiani 53'; Bent 67'; Goals: Kelleher (9/15)	1st: 36–0; 2nd: 42–0; Report

Perth Rectangular Stadium, Perth
Attendance: 13,087
Referee: Belinda Sharpe (Australia)
Video referee: Grant Atkins (Australia)
Touch judges: Dillan Wells (Australia), Karra-Lee Nolan (Australia)
Player of the Match: Olivia Kernick (Australia)

Team details
Australia		Position	England
Name	Number	Position	Number	Name
Tamika Upton	1	FB	1	Francesca Goldthorp
Jaime Chapman	2	WG	2	Anna Davies
Julia Robinson	3	CE	3	Molly Jones
Isabelle Kelly	4	CE	4	Connie Boyd
Abbi Church	5	WG	5	Amelia Brown
Jocelyn Kelleher	6	FE/SO	6	Isabel Rowe
Tarryn Aiken	7	HB/SH	7	Jenna Foubister
Millie Elliott	8	PR	8	Liv Wood
Olivia Higgins	9	HK	9	Keara Bennett
Simaima Taufa	10	PF	10	Hollie Dodd
Tiana Penitani	11	SR	11	Lucy Murray
Shaylee Bent	12	SR	12	Eva Hunter
Olivia Kernick	13	LK/LF	13	Megan Williams
Quincy Dodd	14	IN	14	Jodie Cunningham
Sarah Togatuki	15	IN	15	Victoria Whitfield
Makenzie Weale	16	IN	16	Georgia Roche
Sariah Paki	17	IN	17	Lucie Sams
Ellie Johnston	18	RES	18	Hope Millard
Jess Skinner		Coach		Stuart Barrow

30 October 2026
17:50 AEDT (UTC+11:00)

England	6–24	Samoa
Tries: Cousins 43'; Goals: Roche (1/1)	1st: 0–12; 2nd: 6–12; Report	Tries: Ropati 8', 17', 29'; Taulelei-Saila 37'; Rimoni 65'; Goals: Piliae (2/5)

Wollongong Showground, Wollongong
Attendance: 5,966
Referee: Chris Kendall (England)
Video referee: Adam Gee (Australia)
Touch judges: Dillan Wells (Australia), Karra-Lee Nolan (Australia)
Player of the Match: Freedom Crichton Ropati (Samoa)

Team details
England		Position	Samoa
Name	Number	Position	Number	Name
Francesca Goldthorp	1	FB	1	Destiny Sinapati
Anna Davies	2	WG	2	Mercedez Taulelei-Saila
Georgia Wilson	3	CE	3	Monica Tagoai
Connie Boyd	4	CE	4	Tyra Le Ekepati
Evie Cousins	5	WG	5	Freedom Ropati
Georgia Roche	6	SO/FE	6	Evania Isa'Ako
Isabel Rowe	7	SH/HB	7	Pauline Piliae
Mary Coleman	8	PR	8	Annetta Nuuausala
Keara Bennett	9	HK	9	Mary Jane Taito
Liv Wood	10	PF	10	Laikha Clarke
Hollie Dodd	11	SR	11	Leilani Wilson
Lucy Murray	12	SR	12	Ivana Lolesio
Megan Williams	13	LF/LK	13	Tavarna Papalii
Jodie Cunningham	14	IN	14	Jetaya Faifua
Victoria Whitfield	15	IN	15	Fanua Rimoni
Hope Millard	16	IN	16	Jaydika Tafua
Lucie Sams	17	IN	17	Christabelle Onesome-Tuilaepa
Jenna Foubister	18	RES	18	Jasmine Fogavini
Stuart Barrow		Coach		Frank Pritchard

1 November 2026
15:45 AEDT (UTC+11:00)

Australia	124–6	Wales
Tries: Kernick 5'; Chapman 7', 10', 26', 42', 64', 69'; Church 14', 49'; Southwell 17'; Sergis 19', 29', 38', 53'; Apps 23'; Paki 31'; Joseph 36', 44'; Upton 55', 68'; Nizza 62'; Goals: Southwell (20/21)	1st: 60–0; 2nd: 64–6; Report	Tries: Travis 59'; Goals: Preston (1/1)

Western Sydney Stadium, Sydney
Referee: Kasey Badger (Australia)
Video referee: Peter Gough (Australia)
Touch judges: Karra-Lee Nolan (Australia), Dillan Wells (Australia)
Player of the Match: Jaime Chapman (Australia)

Team details
Australia		Position	Wales
Name	Number	Position	Number	Name
Tamika Upton	1	FB	1	Leanne Burnell
Jaime Chapman	2	WG	2	Zoe Heeley
Jessica Sergis	3	CE	3	Jade Mullen
Isabelle Kelly	4	CE	4	Hannah Bluck
Abbi Church	5	WG	5	Sian Willams
Jesse Southwell	6	FE/SO	6	Ffion Lewis
Tarryn Aiken	7	HB/SH	7	Tayla Preston
Ellie Johnston	8	PR	8	Agnes Wood
Quincy Dodd	9	HK	9	Carys Marsh
Makenzie Weale	10	PF	10	Emily Hughes
Kezie Apps	11	SR	11	Georgia Cussons
Sariah Paki	12	SR	12	Paige Travis
Olivia Kernick	13	LK/LF	13	Bethan Dainton
Keeley Nizza	14	IN	14	Kathryn Salter
Keilee Joseph	15	IN	15	Erin Williams
Sarah Togatuki	16	IN	16	Gracie Hobbs
Sheridan Gallagher	17	IN	17	Lucia Davies
Olivia Higgins	18	RES	18	Danielle Mcgifford
Jess Skinner		Coach		Thomas Brindle

=== Group B ===
Pos	Team	Pld	W	D	L	PF	PA	PD	Pts	Qualification
1	New Zealand (H)	3	3	0	0	150	24	+126	6	Advance to knockout stage
2	Fiji	3	2	0	1	106	28	+78	4	Advance to knockout stage
3	Papua New Guinea (H)	3	1	0	2	74	84	−10	2	
4	France	3	0	0	3	10	204	−194	0	

Source: Source
(H) Hosts

17 October 2026
12:15 PNGST (UTC+10:00)

Papua New Guinea	58–4	France
Tries: Wuriki-Hosea 6'; Long 18', 64'; Ginn 20', 47'; Molo 24', 50'; Kelly 28', 44', 52', 62'; Wong 32'; Goals: Butler (0/2); Veiver (5/10)	1st: 32–0; 2nd: 26–4; Report	Tries: Samarra 37'

PNG Football Stadium, Port Moresby
Attendance: 6,868
Referee: Liam Moore (England)
Video referee: Todd Smith (Australia)
Touch judges: Geoffrey Poumes (France), Dillan Wells (Australia)
Player of the Match: Tia Molo (PNG)

Team details
Papua New Guinea		Position	France
Name	Number	Position	Number	Name
Anika Butler	1	FB	1	Manon Samarra
Ivania Wong	2	WG	2	Perle Ramazeilles
Relna Wuriki-Hosea	3	CE	3	Melisa Medina
Tia Molo	4	CE	4	Amaël Vilanove
Naomi Kelly	5	WG	5	Haoua Kessely
Fleur Ginn	6	FE/SO	6	Camille Boudad
Cynthia Peters	7	HB/SH	7	Lisa Diraison
Elsie Albert	8	PR	8	Elisa Akpa
Ua Ravu	9	HK	9	Cristina Song Puche
Jafinda Sap	10	PF	10	Elodie Pacull
Belinda Gwasamun	11	SR	11	Perrine Monsarrat
Shellie Long	12	SR	12	Stecy Bessier
Emily Veivers	13	LK/LF	13	Leila Bessahli
Therese Aiton	14	IN	14	Fanny Ramos
Essay Banu	15	IN	15	Salome Segala
Jenny David	16	IN	16	Louisa Tooman
India Seeto	17	IN	17	Justine Roses
Gemma Schnaubelt	18	RES	18	Margot Canal
Craig Sandercock		Coach		Alan Walsh

18 October 2026
13:50 AEDT (UTC+11:00)

New Zealand	18–12	Fiji
Tries: Waaka 2', 31'; Tufuga 67'; Goals: Temara (3/3)	1st: 10–12; 2nd: 8–0; Report	Tries: Lutu 21'; Laing 27'; Goals: Yaranuma (1/1); Naitokatoka (1/1)

Newcastle International Sports Centre, Newcastle
Attendance: 10,604
Referee: Belinda Sharpe (Australia)
Video referee: Peter Gough (Australia)
Touch judges: Paki Parkinson (New Zealand), Jack Feavers (New Zealand)
Player of the Match: Stacey Waaka (New Zealand)

Team details
New Zealand		Position	Fiji
Name	Number	Position	Number	Name
Apii Nicholls	1	FB	1	Cassandra Staples
Leianne Tufuga	2	WG	2	Maria Paseka
Mele Hufanga	3	CE	3	Isabella Waterman
Abigail Roache	4	CE	4	Taina Naividi
Stacey Waaka	5	WG	5	Sienna Rose Laing
Zahara Temara	6	FE	6	Luisa Yaranamu
Raecene Mcgregor	7	HB	7	Losana Lutu
Otesa Pule	8	PR	8	Latisha Smythe Uluibanu
Georgia Hale	9	HK	9	Sere Naitokatoka
Shannon Lorraine Mato	10	PF	10	Leilani Asham
Nessa Biddle	11	SR	11	Grace Naleba
Kaiyah Atai	12	SR	12	Tamika Jones
Angelina Teakaraanga Katoa	13	LK	13	Talei Holmes
Ashleigh Quinlan	14	IN	14	Tahlia Marshall
Alexis Tauaneai	15	IN	15	Teaghan Laing-Hartigan
Ivana Lauititi	16	IN	16	Lorren Leli
Brianna Clark	17	IN	17	Nanise Vakacavu
Brooke Anderson	18	RES	18	Naomi Sivoi Tegu
Ricky Henry		Coach		Jone Wesele

24 October 2026
12:15 PNGST (UTC+10:00)

Papua New Guinea	4–40	Fiji
Tries: Ravu 8'; Goals: Butler (0/1)	1st: 4–30; 2nd: 0–10; Report	Tries: Laing 4'; Yaranamu 19'; Naividi 24'; Lutu 30'; Marshall 33', 40', 44'; Goals: Naitokatoka (6/7)

PNG Football Stadium, Port Moresby
Attendance: 7,475
Referee: Kasey Badger (Australia)
Video referee: Todd Smith (Australia)
Touch judges: Tori Wilkie (Australia), Izzy Davidson (Australia)
Player of the Match: Taina Naividi (Fiji)

Team details
Papua New Guinea		Position	Fiji
Name	Number	Position	Number	Name
Anika Butler	1	FB	1	Cassandra Staples
Ivania Wong	2	WG	2	Sienna Rose Laing
Relna Wuriki-Hosea	3	CE	3	Isabella Waterman
Tia Molo	4	CE	4	Taina Naividi
Naomi Kelly	5	WG	5	Tahlia Marshall
Fleur Ginn	6	FE	6	Luisa Yaranamu
Cynthia Peters	7	HB	7	Losana Lutu
Elsie Albert	8	PR	8	Latisha Smythe Uluibanu
Ua Ravu	9	HK	9	Sere Naitokatoka
Jenny David	10	PF	10	Leilani Asham
Belinda Gwasamun	11	SR	11	Grace Naleba
Shellie Long	12	SR	12	Nanise Vakacavu
Emily Veivers	13	LK	13	Talei Holmes
Venesa Nakas	14	IN	14	Tahlia Marshall
Essay Banu	15	IN	15	Teaghan Laing-Hartigan
India Seeto	16	IN	16	Lorren Ieli
Therese Aiton	17	IN	17	Naomi Sivoi Tegu
Gemma Schnaubelt	18	RES	18	Ema Masi
Craig Sandercock		Coach		Jone Wesele

25 October 2026
15:50 NZDT (UTC+13:00)

New Zealand	92–0	France
Tries: Wiki 1', 57'; Nicholls 4', 10', 61', 69'; Kiria-Ratu 7'; Mcgregor 19', 40'; Waaka 22', 28', 52'; Hufanga 25', 32', 35'; Atai 42'; Willison 46', 48' Goals: Kiria-Ratu (9/17); Nicholls (1/1)	1st: 46–0; 2nd: 46–0; Report

Te Kaha Stadium, Christchurch
Referee: Tara Jones (England)
Video referee: Peter Gough (Australia)
Touch judges: Jack Feavers (New Zealand), Paki Parkinson (New Zealand)
Player of the Match: Mele Hufanga (New Zealand)

Team details
New Zealand		Position	France
Name	Number	Position	Number	Name
Apii Nicholls	1	FB	1	Manon Samarra
Tenika Willison	2	WG	2	Margot Canal
Mele Hufanga	3	CE	3	Melisa Medina
Stacey Waaka	4	CE	4	Perle Ramazeilles
Mackenzie Wiki	5	WG	5	Haoua Kessely
Chanty Kiria-Ratu	6	FE/SO	6	Camille Boudad
Raecene Mcgregor	7	HB/SH	7	Lisa Diraison
Alexis Tauaneai	8	PR	8	Elisa Akpa
Georgia Hale	9	HK	9	Fanny Ramos
Ivana Lauititi	10	PF	10	Leila Bessahli
Nessa Biddle	11	SR	11	Perrine Monsarrat
Kaiyah Atai	12	SR	12	Stecy Bessier
Brooke Anderson	13	LK/LF	13	Tallis Eranossian
Ashleigh Quinlan	14	IN	14	Justine Roses
Shaniece Monschau	15	IN	15	Noemie Samuel
Trinity Tauaneai	16	IN	16	Salome Segala
Angelina Teakaraanga Katoa	17	IN	17	Elodie Pacull
Abigail Roache	18	RES	18	Cristina Song Puche
Ricky Henry		Coach		Alan Walsh

31 October 2026
12:35 AEST (UTC+10:00)

Fiji
Tries: Marshall 3', 45'
Paseka 19'
Namoce 24'
Lutu 27'
Staples 39'

Uluibanu 51'
Asham 54'
Naividi 63'
Ieli 67'
Goals: Yaranamu (7/10)

54–6
1st: 20–0
2nd: 34–6
Report

France
Tries: Bessier 38'
Goals: Diralison (1/1)

Robina Stadium, Gold Coast
Attendance: 10,966
Referee: Tara Jones (England)
Video referee: Kasey Badger (Australia)
Touch judges: Izzy Davidson (Australia), Geoffrey Poumes (France)
Player of the Match: Latisha Smythe (Fiji)

Team details
Fiji		Position	France
Name	Number	Position	Number	Name
Cassandra Staples	1	FB	1	Manon Samarra
Maria Paseka	2	WG	2	Margot Canal
Isabella Waterman	3	CE	3	Melisa Medina
Taina Naividi	4	CE	4	Perle Ramazeilles
Tahlia Marshall	5	WG	5	Haoua Kessely
Luisa Yaranamu	6	FE/SO	6	Camille Boudad
Losana Lutu	7	HB/SH	7	Lisa Diraison
Latisha Smythe Uluibanu	8	PR	8	Elisa Akpa
Sere Naitokatoka	9	HK	9	Cristina Song Puche
Lorren Ieli	10	PF	10	Elodie Pacull
Grace Naleba	11	SR	11	Perrine Monsarrat
Talei Holmes	12	SR	12	Stecy Bessier
Leilani Asham	13	LK/LF	13	Leila Bessahli
Ema Masi	14	IN	14	Fanny Ramos
Aliti Namoce	15	IN	15	Salome Segala
Naomi Sivoi Tegu	16	IN	16	Louisa Tooman
Rory Muller	17	IN	17	Justine Roses
Ebony Laing	18	RES	18	Tessa Benmalek
Jone Wesele		Coach		Alan Walsh

31 October 2026
16:55 AEST (UTC+10:00)

New Zealand	40–12	Papua New Guinea
Tries: Waaka 5'; Wiki 18,45'; Atai 33'; Pule 35'; Tufuga 52'; Roache 54,62'; Goals: Temara (4/8)	1st: 14–12; 2nd: 26–0; Report	Tries: Molo 8'; Albert 21'; Goals: Veivers (2/2)

Robina Stadium, Gold Coast
Referee: Belinda Sharpe (Australia)
Video referee: Gerard Sutton (Australia)
Touch judges: Tori Wilkie (Australia), Rochelle Tamarua (New Zealand)
Player of the Match: Apii Nicholls (New Zealand)

Team details
New Zealand		Position	Papua New Guinea
Name	Number	Position	Number	Name
Apii Nicholls	1	FB	1	Anika Butler
Leianne Tufuga	2	WG	2	Mala Mark
Abigail Roache	3	CE	3	Relna Wuriki-Hosea
Stacey Waaka	4	CE	4	Tia Molo
Mackenzie Wiki	5	WG	5	Naomi Kelly
Zahara Temara	6	FE	6	Fleur Ginn
Raecene Mcgregor	7	HB	7	Gemma Schnaubelt
Alexis Tauaneai	8	PR	8	Elsie Albert
Georgia Hale	9	HK	9	Therese Aiton
Shannon Lorraine Mato	10	PF	10	Jenny David
Shaniece Monschau	11	SR	11	Emily Veivers
Kaiyah Atai	12	SR	12	Shellie Long
Angelina Teakaraanga Katoa	13	LK	13	India Seeto
Ashleigh Quinlan	14	IN	14	Essay Banu
Otesa Pule	15	IN	15	Venesa Nakas
Brooke Anderson	16	IN	16	Mya Muller
Ivana Lauititi	17	IN	17	Jafinda Sap
Tenika Willison	18	RES	18	Ua Ravu
Ricky Henry		Coach		Craig Sandercock

== Knockout stage ==
Following the conclusion of Round 2, the National Rugby League announced that the Australian men's and women's teams, having qualified for their respective semi-finals, would both play in Sydney on 8 November 2026.

=== Bracket ===
Semi-finals
7 November – Newcastle
New Zealand	32
Samoa	0
8 November – Sydney
Australia	30
Fiji	14

Final
15 November – Brisbane
Australia	34
New Zealand	10

=== Semi-finals ===
7 November 2026
17:55 AEDT (UTC+11:00)

New Zealand	32–0	Samoa
Tries: Wiki 1'; Waaka 24', 43', 63'; Hufanga 57'; Atai 59'; McGregor 66'; Goals: Kiria-Ratu (2/7)	1st: 8–0; 2nd: 24–0; Report

Newcastle International Sports Centre, Newcastle
Attendance: 29,712
Referee: Tara Jones (England)
Video referee: Todd Smith (Australia)
Touch judges: Tori Wilkie (Australia), Karra-Lee Nolan (Australia)
Player of the Match: Stacey Waaka (New Zealand)

Team details
New Zealand		Position	Samoa
Name	Number	Position	Number	Name
Apii Nicholls	1	FB	1	Destiny Sinapati
Leianne Tufuga	2	WG	2	Mercedez Taulelei-Saila
Mele Hufanga	3	CE	3	Monica Tagoai
Stacey Waaka	4	CE	4	Tyra Le Ekepati
Mackenzie Wiki	5	WG	5	Ana Leatupue
Chanty Kiria-Ratu	6	FE	6	Evania Isa'Ako
Raecene Mcgregor	7	HB	7	Pauline Piliae
Alexis Tauaneai	8	PR	8	Annetta Nuuausala
Georgia Hale	9	HK	9	Mary Jane Taito
Otesa Pule	10	PF	10	Laikha Clarke
Shaniece Monschau	11	SR	11	Leilani Wilson
Kaiyah Atai	12	SR	12	Ivana Lolesio
Angelina Teakaraanga Katoa	13	LK	13	Fanua Rimoni
Ashleigh Quinlan	14	IN	14	Tavarna Papalii
Nessa Biddle	15	IN	15	Christabelle Onesome-Tuilaepa
Shannon Lorraine Mato	16	IN	16	Jasmine Fogavini
Ivana Lauititi	17	IN	17	Christian Pio
Brooke Anderson	18	RES	18	Jaydika Tafua
Ricky Henry		Coach		Frank Pritchard

8 November 2026
17:55 AEDT (UTC+11:00)

Australia	30–14	Fiji
Tries: Church 24', 39', 50', 66'; Upton 28'; Chapman 43'; Goals: Kelleher (3/6)	1st: 8–8; 2nd: 22–6; Report	Tries: Yaranamu 15'; Paseka 61'; Goals: Yaranamu (3/3)

Sydney Football Stadium, Sydney
Attendance: 41,529
Referee: Belinda Sharpe (Australia)
Video referee: Liam Kennedy (Australia)
Touch judges: Dillan Wells (Australia), Izzy Davidson (Australia)
Player of the Match: Abbi Church (Australia)

Team details
Australia		Position	Fiji
Name	Number	Position	Number	Name
Tamika Upton	1	FB	1	Cassandra Staples
Jaime Chapman	2	WG	2	Maria Paseka
Jessica Sergis	3	CE	3	Isabella Waterman
Isabelle Kelly	4	CE	4	Sienna Rose Laing
Abbi Church	5	WG	5	Taina Naividi
Jocelyn Kelleher	6	FE	6	Luisa Yaranamu
Tarryn Aiken	7	HB	7	Losana Lutu
Millie Elliott	8	PR	8	Latisha Smythe Uluibanu
Olivia Higgins	9	HK	9	Sere Naitokatoka
Simaima Taufa	10	PF	10	Lorren Ieli
Tiana Penitani	11	SR	11	Grace Naleba
Shaylee Bent	12	SR	12	Talei Holmes
Olivia Kernick	13	LK	13	Leilani Asham
Keeley Nizza	14	IN	14	Tahlia Marshall
Keilee Joseph	15	IN	15	Teaghan Laing-Hartigan
Kezie Apps	16	IN	16	Ema Masi
Sariah Paki	17	IN	17	Aliti Namoce
Sheridan Gallagher	18	RES	18	Nanise Vakacavu
Jess Skinner		Coach		Jone Wesele

=== Final ===
15 November 2026
15:15 AEST (UTC+10:00)

Australia	34–10	New Zealand
Tries: Chapman 2', 14', 28'; Bent 5'; Sergis 18'; Upton 32'; Goals: Southwell (5/6)	1st: 34–6; 2nd: 0–4; Source	Tries: Mato 23'; Wiki 69'; Goals: Kiria-Ratu (1/2)

Lang Park, Brisbane
Attendance: 28,119
Referee: Belinda Sharpe (Australia)
Video referee: Todd Smith (Australia)
Touch judges: Karra-Lee Nolan (Australia), Tara Jones (England)
Player of the Match: Jaime Chapman (Australia)

Team details
Australia		Position	New Zealand
Name	Number	Position	Number	Name
Tamika Upton	1	FB	1	Apii Nicholls
Jaime Chapman	2	WG	2	Leianne Tufuga
Jessica Sergis	3	CE	3	Mele Hufanga
Isabelle Kelly	4	CE	4	Stacey Waaka
Abbi Church	5	WG	5	Mackenzie Wiki
Jesse Southwell	6	FE	6	Chantay Kiria-Ratu
Tarryn Aiken	7	HB	7	Raecene McGregor
Millie Elliott	8	PR	8	Alexis Tauaneai
Olivia Higgins	9	HK	9	Georgia Hale
Simaima Taufa	10	PF	10	Otesa Pule
Tiana Penitani	11	SR	11	Shaniece Monschau
Shaylee Bent	12	SR	12	Kaiyah Atai
Olivia Kernick	13	LK	13	Angelina Teakaraanga-Katoa
Keeley Nizza	14	IN	14	Ashleigh Quinlan
Keilee Joseph	15	IN	15	Annessa Biddle
Kezie Apps	16	IN	16	Shannon Mato
Sariah Paki	17	IN	17	Ivana Lauitiiti
Sheridan Gallagher	18	RES	18	Brooke Anderson
Jess Skinner		Coach		Ricky Henry

== Team of the tournament ==
Four days after the final, the team of the tournament was announced.

Player	Position	Team
Tamika Upton	Fullback	Australia
Jaime Chapman	Wing	Australia
Isabelle Kelly	Centre	Australia
Stacey Waaka	Centre	New Zealand
Freedom Crichton Ropati	Wing	Samoa
Luisa Yaranamua	Stand-off, Five-eighth	Fiji
Raecene McGregor	Scrum-half, Halfback	New Zealand
Elsie Albert	Prop	Papua New Guinea
Georgia Hale	Hooker	New Zealand
Millie Elliott	Prop	Australia
Evania Isa'ako	Second-row	Samoa
Hollie-Mae Dodd	Second-row	England
Olivia Kernick	Loose forward, Lock	Australia
Sereana Naitokatoka	interchange, Hooker	Fiji
Apii Nicholls	interchange, Fullback	New Zealand
Jessica Sergis	interchange, Centre	Australia
Latisha Smythe	interchange, Prop	Fiji

== See also ==
- 2026 Men's Rugby League World Cup
- 2026 Wheelchair Rugby League World Cup
- 2026 Women's Rugby League World Cup squads
