= Tyra Ekepati =

Samoa women's international rugby league player

Personal information
- Born: Tyra Ekepati; 22 November 2006 (age 19) Gosford, New South Wales, Australia

Playing information
- Position: Centre
Club
Years	Team	Pld	T	G	FG	P
2025–	St. George Illawarra Dragons	13	3	0	0	12
Representative
Years	Team	Pld	T	G	FG	P
2026	Samoa	3	3	0	0	12
- Source: RLP As of 8 November 2026

Tyra Ekepati (born 22 November 2006) is a Samoan women's international rugby league player. She plays centre for the St. George Illawarra Dragons in the NRLW.

== Career ==
=== St George Illawarra Dragons ===
She made her NRLW debut in round 5 of the 2025 NRL Women's season for the Dragons against the Parramatta Eels.

=== Representative ===
She made her international debut for Fetu Samoa in the 2026 Women's Rugby League World Cup against Wales scoring 3 tries on debut in a 76-0 win.
