= Haoua Kessely =

France international rugby league player & triple jumper

Personal information
- Nationality: (France) French
- Born: 2 February 1988 (age 38) Mantes-la-Jolie, Île-de-France, France
- Height: 1.74 m (5 ft 9 in)
- Rugby league career

Playing information
- Position: Wing, Prop
Club
Years	Team	Pld	T	G	FG	P
2024–	AS Ayguesvives
Representative
Years	Team	Pld	T	G	FG	P
2024–26	France	4	6	0	0	24
- As of 31 October 2026

Sport
- Events: Long Jump, Triple Jump
- Club: CA Balma
- Coached by: Dominique Hernandez

Haoua Kessely (born 2 February 1988 in Mantes-la-Jolie, France) is a French athlete who specialises in the triple jump and rugby league player. Kessely competed at the 31st 2011 European Athletics Indoor Championships.

== Biography ==
=== Athletics ===
Haoua has won six French national Indoor Athletic Championships: five in the Long Jump in 2009, 2011, 2012, 2015 and 2016, and one in the triple jump in 2011.

In 2015 at Villeneuve-d'Ascq, she won her first Output Long Jump title with a jump of 6.13m.

=== Rugby League ===
She made her France international début in the 58-0 win over Serbia on 22 June 2024 in the 2026 Women's Rugby League World Cup qualification round, played in Belgrade.

She scored four tries in the game against Nigeria on 1 August 2026, then made two more appearances in the 2026 Women's Rugby League World Cup in October 2026.

== Prizes ==
- French Outdoor National Athletic Championships :
  - gold medal for Long Jump in 2015 and 2016
- French Indoor National Athletic Championships :
  - gold medal for Long Jump in 2009, 2011, 2012, 2015 and 2016
  - gold medal in Triple Jump 2011
