= Freedom Crichton Ropati =

Samoa women's international rugby league player

Personal information
- Born: Freedom Crichton Ropati; 14 March 2008 (age 18) Auckland, New Zealand

Playing information
- Position: Wing
Club
Years	Team	Pld	T	G	FG	P
2026–	Parramatta Eels	1	0	0	0	0
Representative
Years	Team	Pld	T	G	FG	P
2026	Samoa	3	4	0	0	16
- Source: RLP As of 8 November 2026
- Relatives: Stephen Crichton (cousin); Brian To'o (brother-in-law)

Freedom Crichton Ropati (born 14 March 2008) is a Samoan women's international rugby league player. She plays wing for the Parramatta Eels in the NRLW.

== Career ==
=== Parramatta Eels ===
She made her NRLW debut in round 11 of the 2026 NRL Women's season for the Eels against the North Queensland Cowboys.

=== Representative ===
She made her international debut for Samoa against the Jillaroos in the 2026 Women's Rugby League World Cup.

== Personal ==
She is the cousin of Stephen Crichton and her brother-in-law is Brian To'o; both play for the Samoa men's rugby league team.
