= Fiji women's national rugby league team =

National sports team

Fiji
Team information
- Nickname: Bulikula
- Governing body: Fiji National Rugby League
- Region: Asia Pacific
- Head coach: Jone Wesele
- Captain: Sereana Naitokatoka
- Most caps: Sereana Naitokatoka (10)
- Top try-scorer: Tahlia Marshall (8)
- Top point-scorer: Luisa Yaranamua (62)
- Home stadium: HFC Bank Stadium
- IRL ranking: 12 (20 August 2026)

Team results
- First international
- Fiji 0–68 Australia (20 September 1998)
- Biggest win
- Fiji 62–4 Ireland (26 October 2025)
- Biggest defeat
- Fiji 0–68 Australia (20 September 1998)
- World Cup
- Appearances: 1 (first time in 2026)
- Best result: (bronze) Semi-finals (2026)

The Fiji women's national rugby league team, nicknamed the Bulikula (Fijian: [ᵐbu.liˈku.la], lit. 'Golden Cowries'), represents Fiji in international women's rugby league.

== Results ==
=== Head to head records ===
Opponent	FM	MR	M	W	D	L	Win%	PF	PA	Share
Australia	1998	2026	3	0	0	3	0.00%	14	150	8.54%
Papua New Guinea	2019	2026	2	2	0	0	100.00%	68	4	94.44%
Samoa	2023	2024	2	0	0	2	0.00%	24	42	36.36%
Cook Islands	2024	2024	1	1	0	0	100.00%	18	6	75.00%
Canada	2025	2025	1	1	0	0	100.00%	48	0	100.00%
Nigeria	2025	2025	1	1	0	0	100.00%	62	4	93.94%
New Zealand	2026	2026	1	0	0	1	0.00%	12	18	40.00%
France	2026	2026	1	1	0	0	100.00%	54	6	90.00%
Totals	1998	2026	12	6	0	6	50.00%	300	230	56.60%

Notes:

- Table last updated 9 November 2026.
- Share is the portion of "For" points compared to the sum of "For" and "Against" points.

=== Full internationals ===
Date	Opponent	Score	Tournament	Venue	Ref
19 Sep 1998	Australia	0–68	2 Test Series	University of South Pacific, Suva	
26 Sep 1998	Australia	0–52	2 Test Series	University of South Pacific, Suva	
22 Jun 2019	Papua New Guinea	28–0	Test Match	Leichhardt Oval, Sydney	
15 Oct 2023	Samoa	12–26	Test Match	Santos Stadium, Port Moresby	
26 Oct 2024	Cook Islands	18–6	2024 Pacific Championship	HFC Bank Stadium, Suva	
2 Nov 2024	Samoa	12–16	2024 Pacific Championship	Go Media Stadium, Auckland	
21 Oct 2025	Canada	48–0	2026 World Cup qualification 2025 World Series	Terry Fox Stadium, Brampton, Ontario	
26 Oct 2025	Nigeria	62–4	2026 World Cup qualification 2025 World Series	Terry Fox Stadium, Brampton, Ontario	
18 Oct 2026	New Zealand	12–18	2026 World Cup	McDonald Jones Stadium	
24 Oct 2026	Papua New Guinea	40–4	2026 World Cup	Santos Stadium, Port Moresby	
31 Oct 2026	France	54–6	2026 World Cup	Cbus Super Stadium, Gold Coast	
8 Nov 2026	Australia	14–30	2026 World Cup	Allianz Stadium, Sydney	

=== Nines ===
Fiji won the gold medal at the 2019 Pacific Games and a bronze medal at the 2023 Pacific Games.

Date	Opponent	Score	Tournament	Venue	Video	Reports
23 Feb 2018	Samoa	6–24	2018 Commonwealth Championship	Dolphin Stadium		
23 Feb 2018	Australia	0–24	2018 Commonwealth Championship	Dolphin Stadium		
24 Feb 2018	Canada	12–16	2018 Commonwealth Championship	Dolphin Stadium		
8 Jul 2019	Papua New Guinea	16–8	2019 Pacific Games	Apia Park		
8 Jul 2019	Niue	18–0	2019 Pacific Games	Apia Park		
9 Jul 2019	Samoa	12–4	2019 Pacific Games	Apia Park		
9 Jul 2019	Papua New Guinea	16–14	2019 Pacific Games	Apia Park		
20 Nov 2023	Samoa	22–10	2023 Pacific Games	National Stadium, Honiara		
20 Nov 2023	Tonga	8–14	2023 Pacific Games	National Stadium, Honiara		
20 Nov 2023	Vanuatu	44–0	2023 Pacific Games	National Stadium, Honiara		
21 Nov 2023	Cook Islands	10–18	2023 Pacific Games	National Stadium, Honiara		
21 Nov 2023	Solomon Islands	18–0	2023 Pacific Games	National Stadium, Honiara		
22 Nov 2023	Samoa	4–0	2023 Pacific Games	National Stadium, Honiara		

== Current squad ==
Head Coach: Jone Wesele

Fiji announced 23-woman squad for the World Cup.

Jersey numbers in the table reflect the team selection for the Semi-Final match against Australia.

J#	Player	Age	Position(s)	Fiji Bulikula						Club	NRLW						Other Reps
J#	Player	Age	Position(s)	Dbt	M	T	G	F	Pts	Club	CM	TM	T	G	F	Pts	Other Reps
1	Cassie Staples	34	Fullback, Wing	2023	9	6	0	0	24	Sharks	39	40	17	0	0	68	1
2	Maria Paseka	20	Wing	2025	5	6	0	0	24	Dragons	0	15	6	6	0	36	—
3	Isabella Waterman	26	Centre, Wing	2025	6	2	1	0	10	Raiders	16	17	8	0	0	32	—
4	Sienna Laing	19	Centre, Wing	2023	8	4	0	0	16	Bears	0	0	0	0	0	0	—
5	Taina Naividi	25	Wing, Centre, Hooker	2024	6	2	0	0	8	Roosters	26	31	16	0	0	64	2
6	Luisa Yaranamua	23	Five-eighth, Lock	2024	8	2	27	0	62	Rabbitohs	0	0	0	0	0	0	—
7	Losana Lutu	22	Halfback, Five-eighth	2024	6	3	0	0	12	Tigers	25	26	4	3	0	22	—
8	Latisha Smythe	22	Prop, Second-row	2024	8	1	0	0	4	Bulldogs	16	16	0	0	0	0	—
9	Sereana Naitokatoka	25	Hooker, Five-eighth	2019	10	0	7	0	14	Raiders	16	29	3	0	0	12	1
10	Lorren Ieli	19	Prop, Second-row	2026	4	1	0	0	4	Titans	0	0	0	0	0	0	—
11	Elizabeth Naleba	—	Second-row	2025	6	0	0	0	0	Bears	0	0	0	0	0	0	—
12	Talei Holmes	26	Second-row, Lock	2019	8	1	0	0	4	Sharks	36	46	0	0	0	0	2
13	Leilani Ahsam	20	Lock, Prop	2025	6	4	0	0	16	Sharks	0	0	0	0	0	0	—
14	Tahlia Marshall	22	Wing, Five-eighth	2025	6	8	0	0	32	Tigers	0	0	0	0	0	0	—
15	Teaghan Hartigan	30	Lock	2019	9	1	0	0	4	Bears	0	2	0	0	0	0	—
16	Ema Masi	30	Second-row	2026	2	0	0	0	0	Devils	0	0	0	0	0	0	—
17	Aliti Namoce	28	Second-row, Prop	2023	4	2	0	0	8	Rabbitohs	0	8	0	0	0	0	3
18	Nanise Vakacavu	21	Prop	2024	4	0	0	0	0	Sharks	0	0	0	0	0	0	—
19	Naomi Tegu	—	interchange	2025	4	1	0	0	4	USP Raiders	0	0	0	0	0	0	—
20	Abigayle Sekitoga	22	Wing	2024	3	1	0	0	4	Bears	0	0	0	0	0	0	—
21	Rory Muller	—	Hooker	2024	4	0	0	0	0	Rabbitohs	0	0	0	0	0	0	—
22	Ebony Laing	—	Prop	2025	2	1	0	0	4	Bears	0	0	0	0	0	0	—
–	Keilani Manu	—	Lock, Second-row	2025	3	1	0	0	4	Rabbitohs	0	0	0	0	0	0	—
IJ	Tamika Jones	23	Second-row	2026	1	0	0	0	0	Bulldogs	8	8	1	0	0	4	—

== Records ==
=== Margins and streaks ===
Biggest winning margins

Margin	Score	Opponent	Venue	Date
58	62–4	Ireland	Terry Fox Stadium	26 Oct 2025
48	48–0	Canada	Terry Fox Stadium	21 Oct 2025
48	54–6	France	Cbus Super Stadium	31 Oct 2026
36	40–4	Papua New Guinea	Santos National Football Stadium	24 Oct 2026
28	28–0	Papua New Guinea	Leichhardt Oval	22 June 2019
12	18–6	Cook Islands	HFC Bank Stadium	26 Oct 2024

Biggest losing margins

Margin	Score	Opponent	Venue	Date
68	0–68	Australia	University of South Pacific	19 Sept 1998
52	0–52	Australia	University of South Pacific	26 Sept 1998
16	14–30	Australia	Allianz Stadium	8 Nov 2026
14	12–26	Samoa	Santos National Football Stadium	15 Oct 2023

Most consecutive wins

Matches	First win	Last win	Days	Ended	Days
2	21 Oct 2025	26 Oct 2025	5 days	18 Oct 2026	357 days
2	24 Oct 2026	31 Oct 2026	7 days	8 Nov 2026	15 days

Most consecutive losses

Matches	First loss	Last loss	Days	Ended	Days
2	19 Sep 1998	26 Sep 1998	7 days	22 Jun 2019	20 years, 276 days

== Past squads ==
=== 2019 ===
Squad for the June 2019 Test versus Papua New Guinea; This was Fiji Women's first thirteen-a-side match since hosting two matches against Australia in September 1998.

- Timaima Ravisa
- Roela Radiniyavuni
- Patricia Raikadroka
- Tanika Marshall
- Limaina Wai
- Teaghan Hartigan
- Sereana Naitokatoka
- Canecia Sims
- Ateca Laiyamo
- Tokasa Lomalagi
- Talei Holmes
- Josephine Maejiirs
- Eloise Vunakece
- Vilisi Vakaloloma
- Losena Qiolevu
- Merewairita Nai
- Asena Rokomarama
