= Tavarna Papalii =

Samoa international rugby league footballer

Personal information
- Full name: Tavarna Papalii
- Born: 7 July 2005 (age 21) Wollongong, New South Wales, Australia
- Height: 172 cm (5 ft 8 in)
- Weight: 70 kg (11 st 0 lb)

Playing information
- Position: Five-eighth, Lock
Club
Years	Team	Pld	T	G	FG	P
2024–	Sydney Roosters	8	0	0	0	0
Representative
Years	Team	Pld	T	G	FG	P
2024–26	Samoa	7	2	0	0	8
2025	Queensland	3	0	0	0	0
- Source: As of 16 November 2026

Tavarna Papalii (born 7 July 2005) is an Australian professional rugby league footballer who currently plays for the Sydney Roosters in the NRL Women's Premiership and Samoa.

== Background ==
Papalii was born in Wollongong, New South Wales and is of Samoan and Irish descent. She was raised on the Gold Coast, Queensland, where she attended Keebra Park State High School and played junior rugby league for the Nerang Roosters.

== Playing career ==
=== Early years ===
In 2022, Papalii played for the Burleigh Bears in the QRL Under 19s competition. Later that year she represented and captained the inaugural Australian Schoolgirls team on their tour of Fiji.

In 2023, she joined the Sydney Roosters, playing for their under-19 Tarsha Gale Cup side and winning Player of the Match in their Grand Final win over the Canterbury Bulldogs.

In July 2023, she was named in the Queensland Under-19 and Australian Schoolgirls sides but tore her ACL at the National Championships, ruling her out for the season.

=== 2024 ===
In Round 4 of the 2024 NRL Women's season, Papalii made her NRLW debut in the Roosters' 28–8 win over the St George Illawarra Dragons. On 6 October, she came off the bench in the Roosters' 32–28 Grand Final win over the Cronulla Sharks.

On 19 October, she made her Test debut for Samoa, playing three games as they earned qualification to the 2026 Women's Rugby League World Cup.

=== 2025 ===
On 14 April, she was named to make her debut for Queensland in Game I of the 2025 Women's State of Origin series.
