= Jone Wesele =

Fiji international rugby league footballer & coach

Personal information
- Born: 13 April 1982 (age 44) Fiji

Playing information
- Position: Centre, Lock
Representative
Years	Team	Pld	T	G	FG	P
2006–09	Fiji	9	1	0	0	4

Coaching information
Representative
Years	Team	Gms	W	D	L	W%
2026–	Fiji women	4	2	0	2	50
- Source: As of 8 November 2026

Jone Wesele (born 13 April 1982) is a Fijian rugby league coach and former player who is the head coach of the Fiji women's national team. As a player, Wesele represented Fiji at the 2008 Rugby League World Cup and 2009 Pacific Cup.

Wesele played his domestic rugby league with the Police Sharks in his native Fiji but then moved back to his original club that he started off, having previously played for the Darlington Point, Coleambally Roosters in Australia. Now Jone Wesele has moved back and plays for the Makoi Bulldogs.

In August 2026, Wesele was appointed as head coach of the Fiji women's team ahead of the 2026 Women's Rugby League World Cup.
