= Isabel Rowe =

England international rugby league footballer (born 2006)

Personal information
- Born: 2 November 2006 (age 19) Wigan, Greater Manchester, England

Playing information
- Position: Scrum-half, Stand-off
Club
| Years | Team | Pld | T | G | FG | P |
|---|---|---|---|---|---|---|
| 2024– | Wigan Warriors | 42 | 27 | 190 | 0 | 488 |
Representative
| Years | Team | Pld | T | G | FG | P |
| 2024–26 | England | 6 | 4 | 31 | 0 | 78 |
- Source: As of 30 October 2026

Isabel Rowe (born 2 November 2006) is English rugby league footballer who plays as a scrum-half for Wigan Warriors in the Women's Super League and England at international level. She was Women's Super League Young Player of the Year, for the 2025 season.

== Club career ==
Rowe was a member of the Rugby Football League's diploma in sporting excellence (DiSE) programme in 2023.

=== 2024 ===
Rowe made her debut for the Wigan Warriors in the first round of the Women's Challenge Cup, scoring two tries in a 68–0 win over Salford Red Devils at the Salford Stadium.

Rowe played a total of 15 times in the 2024 Women's Super League season, scoring eight tries and kicking 39 goals. She also appeared five times in the 2024 Women's Challenge Cup, scoring four times and kicking two goals, with Wigan knocked out in the semi-finals 20–34 to Leeds Rhinos.

=== 2025 ===
In round 2 of the 2025 season, Rowe became a joint Women's Super League record holder when she kicked 15 goals in a 106–6 win over Barrow Raiders, tying with former Wigan player Emma Knowles, who achieved the feat in the 2024 season.

In round 12, Rowe scored her first hatrick for Wigan in a 0–92 win over Barrow Raiders.

Rowe finished the league season having scored five tries and kicking 95 goals, which set the records for most points in a Women's Super League season, as well as the most goals scored by a player in a season. She was part of the Wigan Warriors side that completed the treble in the 2025 season, winning the League Leader's Shield, Super League, and the Women's Challenge Cup. The team also won the RFL Women's Nines.

At the end of the 2025 season, Rowe was awarded Women's Super League Young Player of the Year, beating Wigan teammate Jenna Foubister and Leeds Rhinos' Ruby Bruce. Rowe was also nominated for Woman of Steel, but lost out to teammate Eva Hunter.

== International career ==
On 29 June 2024, Rowe made her first senior appearance for England against France, kicking five goals in a 42–0 win at the Stade Ernest-Wallon.

On 9 August 2025, Rowe scored her first try for England in a 62–0 win over Wales at the Gnoll Stadium.

She was named in the England squad for the 2026 World Cup. In their opening match of the tournament against Wales, Rowe scored two tries and kicked nine conversions with her total tally of 26 points equalling the record for the most by an individual England player in a single game at a World Cup.

== Club statistics ==
| Club | Season | Tier | App | T | G | DG | Pts |
|---|---|---|---|---|---|---|---|
| Wigan Warriors | 2024 | Super League | 20 | 13 | 40 | 0 | 132 |
| Wigan Warriors | 2025 | Super League | 17 | 7 | 102 | 0 | 232 |
| Wigan Warriors | 2026 | Super League | 5 | 7 | 47 | 0 | 122 |
| Wigan Warriors | 2027 | Super League | | | | | |
| Wigan Warriors | Total | | 42 | 27 | 190 | 0 | 488 |
| Career total | | | 42 | 27 | 190 | 0 | 488 |

== Honours ==
=== Wigan Warriors ===
- Super League
  - Winners (1): 2025
  - League Leader's Shield (1): 2025
- Challenge Cup
  - Winners (1): 2025
- RFL Women's Nines
  - Winners (2): 2024, 2025

=== Individual ===
- Women's Super League Young Player of the Year: 2025
