= Aliti Namoce =

Fiji international rugby league footballer (born 1997)

Personal information
- Full name: Aliti Namoce Sagano
- Born: 31 December 1997 (age 28) Suva, Fiji,
- Height: 174 cm (5 ft 9 in)
- Weight: 105 kg (16 st 7 lb)

Playing information
- Position: Prop
Club
Years	Team	Pld	T	G	FG	P
2019	Sydney Roosters	3	0	0	0	0
2022–	St. George Illawarra	5	0	0	0	0
	Total	8	0	0	0	0
Representative
Years	Team	Pld	T	G	FG	P
2023–	Fiji	3	2	0	0	8
- Source: RLP As of 8 November 2026

Aliti Namoce (born 31 December 1997) is a Fijian rugby league footballer who plays for the St George Illawarra Dragons in the NSWRL Women's Premiership and has represented Fiji. Primarily a prop, she previously played for the Sydney Roosters Women in the NRL Women's Premiership.

== Background ==
Born in Fiji, Namoce grew up in Blacktown, New South Wales and attended Seven Hills High School, where she played rugby union.

== Playing career ==
In 2019, Namoce began playing rugby league for the North Sydney Bears in the NSWRL Women's Premiership.

In June 2019, she represented NSW City at the Women's National Championships. On 22 June 2019, she was selected as 18th player for Fiji in their 28–0 win over Papua New Guinea.

On 1 July 2019, she signed with the Sydney Roosters NRL Women's Premiership team. In Round 1 of the 2019 NRL Women's season, she made her debut for the Roosters in their 12–16 win over the New Zealand Warriors.
