= Emily Veivers =

PNG international rugby league footballer

Personal information
- Full name: Emily Veivers
- Born: 18 May 2001 (age 25) Brisbane, Queensland, Australia
- Height: 164 cm (5 ft 5 in)
- Weight: 78 kg (12 st 4 lb)

Playing information
- Position: Hooker, Second-row
Club
Years	Team	Pld	T	G	FG	P
2025	Wigan Warriors	11	4	1	0	18
2026–	Nth Qld Cowboys	2	0	0	0	0
	Total	13	4	1	0	18
Representative
Years	Team	Pld	T	G	FG	P
2022–26	Papua New Guinea	12	1	15	0	34
2023–26	PNG PM's XIII	3	0	0	0	0
- Source: As of 16 November 2026

Emily Veivers (born 18 May 2001) is an Australian professional rugby league footballer who currently plays for the North Queensland Cowboys in the NRL Women's Premiership.

A Papua New Guinea international, she previously played for the Wigan Warriors in the Women's Super League.

== Background ==
Veivers was born in Brisbane and is of Papua New Guinean descent through her mother, who was born and raised in Port Moresby.

She played her junior rugby league for the Beenleigh Lions and attended Beenleigh State High School.

== Playing career ==
=== Early years ===
From 2020 to 2024, Veivers played for the Souths Logan Magpies, Brisbane Tigers and Norths Devils in the QRL Women's Premiership.

In 2022, she represented Papua New Guinea at the Women's World Cup.

=== 2025 ===
Veivers joined the Wigan Warriors for the 2025 season. Despite an injury interrupted season, in which a broken arm saw her miss 14 weeks, Veivers played in Wigan's Challenge Cup final and Grand Final victories over St Helens.

=== 2026 ===
After initially returning to Australia to rejoin the Norths Devils, Veivers secured an NRLW deal with the North Queensland Cowboys, signing a two-year contract.

In Round 1 of the 2026 NRL Women's season, she made her NRLW debut in the Cowboys' loss to the Brisbane Broncos.
