= Paige Travis =

Wales women's international rugby league player

Personal information
- Born: Paige Travis; 11 August 1999 (age 27) Rochdale, Greater Manchester, England

Playing information
- Position: Second-row
Club
Years	Team	Pld	T	G	FG	P
2019–24	St Helens	13	10	0	0	40
2025	Parramatta Eels	11	0	0	0	0
2026–	St Helens	5	2	0	0	8
	Total	29	12	0	0	48
Representative
Years	Team	Pld	T	G	FG	P
2021–24	England	7	3	0	0	12
2026	Wales	3	2	0	0	8
- Source: RLP As of 8 November 2026

Paige Travis (born 11 August 1999) is an English born rugby league player who plays at second-row for St Helens in the RFL Women's Super League. She previously played for Parramatta Eels in the NRLW.

== Career ==
She started her career playing for St Helens in the 2019 RFL Women's Super League. In 2021 she won a treble with St Helens winning the RFL Women's Super League, the League Leaders Shield and the Women's Challenge Cup she also played in four Challenge Cup finals in a row for St Helens between 2021 and 2024 before joining Australian NRLW club the Parramatta Eels. She scored Wales only try in a 124-6 record loss to the Jillaroos.
