= Ricky Henry (rugby league) =

New Zealand RL coach and former rugby league footballer

Playing information
- Position: Centre
Representative
Years	Team	Pld	T	G	FG	P
1996	NZ Māori	2	2	0	0	8

Coaching information
Club
Years	Team	Gms	W	D	L	W%
2024–	NQ Cowboys Women	32	14	0	18	44
Representative
Years	Team	Gms	W	D	L	W%
2022–	NZ Kiwi Ferns	15	9	0	6	60
- Source: As of 15 November 2026

Ricky Henry is a New Zealand professional rugby league football coach who is the head coach of the North Queensland Cowboys Women in the NRL Women's Premiership (NRLW) and the New Zealand women's national rugby league team.

He previously worked with the New Zealand Warriors, as an assistant to their NRL team and head coach of their New South Wales Cup team.

== Background ==
Henry is of Māori descent from the Ngāpuhi and Ngāti Kahungunu iwis.

== Playing career ==
A Junior Kiwis and New Zealand Māori representative, Henry joined the Auckland Warriors in 1995, spending three years at the club without playing first grade. In 1997, he played in the Warriors' Super League Reserve Grade Grand Final loss to the Canterbury Bulldogs. In 1998, Henry joined the South Sydney Rabbitohs, playing reserve grade for two seasons.

== Coaching career ==
=== New Zealand Warriors ===
From 2008 to 2011, Henry worked in a development coaching role with the New Zealand Warriors, which involved preparing NRL Under-20s players for the NRL. Prior to this he coached the Richmond Rovers in the Auckland Rugby League.

In 2012, he was appointed head coach of the Auckland Vulcans, the Warriors' New South Wales Cup feeder club. Following the season, he was promoted to Warriors' NRL assistant coach under Matthew Elliott. He left the role at the end of the 2014 season following Elliott's departure.

In 2016, Henry returned to the Warriors as NSW Cup assistant coach under Stacey Jones. In 2017, he took over from Jones as head coach, taking the side to the preliminary final. In 2018, he coached the Warriors' Jersey Flegg Cup side. In 2019, he was again the assistant coach for the NSW Cup side.

=== New Zealand Kiwi Ferns ===
On 20 September 2020, Henry was announced as head coach of the New Zealand women's national rugby league team. On 7 November 2020, he won his first game in charge of the side, a 28–8 win over Fetu Samoa at Mt Smart Stadium.

In November 2022, Henry led the Kiwi Ferns to the final of the 2021 Women's Rugby League World Cup, which they lost to Australia 54–4.

On 28 October 2023, the Kiwi Ferns defeated Australia 12–6 to win the Pacific Championships. It was their first win over Australia since 2016 and their first major trophy since the 2008 World Cup.

=== North Queensland Cowboys ===
On 20 February 2024, Henry was appointed head coach of the North Queensland Cowboys Women's team, signing a three-year contract.
