= Ema Masi =

Fiji international rugby union & league player

- Born: 18 March 1996 (age 30) Suva, Fiji

Rugby union career
- Position(s): Lock, Loose forward
Senior career
Years	Team	Apps	(Points)
2020	Brumbies Women		(10)
2022	Queensland Reds		(0)
International career
Years	Team	Apps	(Points)
2022	Fiji	3	(0)
- Rugby league career

Playing information
- Position: Second-row
Club
Years	Team	Pld	T	G	FG	P
2024	Norths Devils	16	3	0	0	12
Representative
Years	Team	Pld	T	G	FG	P
2026	Fiji	2	0	0	0	0
- As of 13 November 2026

Ema Masi is a Fijian rugby union and rugby league player.

In 2013, Masi was selected for the Australian women's extended training squad in preparation for the 2014 Youth Olympic Games in China. She was one of 22 Olympic hopefuls that attended a series of training camps in Narrabeen in hopes of making the final squad.

In 2017, she played for the University of Canberra in the Australian University Sevens competition.

Masi played for the Brumbies Women in the 2020 Super W season, she scored a brace of tries in the 24–12 loss to Queensland. After an outstanding season with Brumbies, she was named Helen Taylor Brumbies Super W Player of the Year and was later named the 2020 Buildcorp Super W Player of the year.

In 2022, she was named in the Queensland Reds wider training squad for Super W.

Masi was selected for the Fijiana squad for two test matches against Australia and Japan in May. She made her international debut in the test against Australia. In July, she was recalled into the Fijiana squad for the 2022 Oceania Championship in New Zealand. She was in the starting line up for the test against Papua New Guinea. She then featured in the match against Tonga.

She made her Fiji international début in the 2026 Rugby League World Cup 54-6 win over France on 31 October 2026.
