= Shellie Long =

PNG international rugby league footballer (born 2000)

Personal information
- Born: 14 August 2000 (age 26) Port Moresby, Papua New Guinea
- Height: 167 cm (5 ft 6 in)
- Weight: 70 kg (11 st 0 lb)

Playing information
- Position: Centre, Wing
Club
Years	Team	Pld	T	G	FG	P
2023–24	North Qld Cowboys	11	1	0	0	4
Representative
Years	Team	Pld	T	G	FG	P
2022–26	Papua New Guinea	7	3	0	0	12
2023–	PNG PM's XIII	1	0	0	0	0
- Source: As of 22 November 2026

Shellie Long (born 14 August 2000) is a Papua New Guinean professional rugby league footballer.

She played for the North Queensland Cowboys in the NRL Women's Premiership and played for Papua New Guinea at the 2021 Women's Rugby League World Cup.

== Background ==
Long was born in Port Moresby, Papua New Guinea and moved to Innisfail, Queensland at a young age. She played her junior rugby league for the Innisfail Brothers.

== Playing career ==
In 2019, Long played for the South Grafton Rebels and represented New South Wales Country at the Women's National Championships in Burleigh.

In 2020 and 2021, Long played for the Burleigh Bears in the QRL Women's Premiership. In 2022, she played for the Brisbane Tigers.

In December 2021, Long signed for the St George Illawarra Dragons NRLW side but did not play a game, being named 18th player three times.

In November 2022, she represented Papua New Guinea at the Women's World Cup, playing three games and scoring a try in their 34–12 win over Canada.

=== 2023 ===
In 2023, Long played for the Souths Logan Magpies in the QRL Women's Premiership.

On 24 April, Long signed with the North Queensland Cowboys on a two-year contract.

In Round 1 of the 2023 NRL Women's season, Long made her NRLW debut, starting at centre in a 16–6 loss to the Gold Coast Titans. In Round 3, she scored her first NRLW try in a 40–12 loss to the Brisbane Broncos.
