= Craig Sandercock =

Australian rugby league coach

Personal information
- Born: 1969 (age 56–57)

Coaching information
Club
Years	Team	Gms	W	D	L	W%
2012–14	Hull Kingston Rovers	77	31	3	43	40
2022	Canterbury Bulldogs Women	1	0	0	1	0
2026–	Wests Tigers Women	12	7	0	5	58
	Total	90	38	3	49	42
Representative
Years	Team	Gms	W	D	L	W%
2026–	Papua New Guinea	3	1	0	2	33
- Source: As of 31 October 2026

Craig Sandercock is an Australian rugby league coach who is the head coach for the Wests Tigers Women and Papua New Guinea.

== Coaching career ==
=== Newcastle Knights ===
Sandercock taught Human Society and its Environment (HSIE) subjects at The Pittwater House Schools in Sydney, alongside his role on the coaching staff of the Manly-Warringah Sea Eagles before joining the Newcastle Knights in 2010 to be an assistant coach.

=== Hull Kingston Rovers ===
In 2012, he was appointed the head coach of Hull Kingston Rovers. On 3 July 2014 he was released by Hull KR.

=== Newcastle Knights (return) ===
On 8 September 2014, it was announced that Sandercock would be returning to the Newcastle Knights as assistant coach to newly appointed head coach Rick Stone.

=== Wests Tigers ===
After a year with the Knights, Sandercock joined the Wests Tigers for 2016 as an assistant coach to head coach Jason Taylor.

=== Canterbury-Bankstown Bulldogs Women ===
He was, until May 2024, head coach of the Canterbury-Bankstown Bulldogs Women He was previously assistant coach to the Bulldogs men's NRL team and the head coach of Super League team Hull Kingston Rovers.

=== Wyong Roos ===
On 24 May 2024, he was appointed head coach of Wyong Roos

== International ==
On 1 May 2026, it was reported that she had taken up the role of head-coach for Papua New Guinea

He won his first game in charge of Papua New Guinea in the 2026 Rugby League World Cup game 58-4 v France on 17 October 2026.
