= Tenika Willison =

NZ international rugby union, sevens & league player

- Born: 7 December 1997 (age 28) Hamilton, Waikato, New Zealand
- Height: 1.67 m (5 ft 6 in)
- Weight: 69 kg (10 st 12 lb)
- School: Hamilton Girls' High School
- Notable relative(s): Jackson Willison (cousin); Xavier Willison (cousin); Te Maire Martin (cousin); Taine Tuaupiki (cousin)

Rugby union career
Provincial / State sides
Years	Team	Apps	(Points)
2015–2021	Waikato	20	(65)
Super Rugby
Years	Team	Apps	(Points)
2023	Chiefs Manawa	9	(40)
International career
Years	Team	Apps	(Points)
2023	New Zealand	2	(2)
National sevens team
Years	Team		Comps
2016–23	New Zealand		86 apps
- Rugby league career

Playing information
- Position: Wing
Club
Years	Team	Pld	T	G	FG	P
2024–	Newcastle Knights	31	10	0	0	40
Representative
Years	Team	Pld	T	G	FG	P
2026	Māori All Stars	1	2	0	0	8
2026	New Zealand	2	2	0	0	8
- As of 18 November 2026
Medal record
Women's rugby sevens
Representing New Zealand
Olympic Games
Gold medal – first place	2020 Tokyo	Team competition
Gold medal – first place	2024 Paris	Team competition
Rugby World Cup Sevens
Gold medal – first place	2018 San Francisco	Team competition
Silver medal – second place	2022 Cape Town	Team competition
Commonwealth Games
Bronze medal – third place	2022 Birmingham	Team competition

Tenika Willison (born 7 December 1997) is a New Zealand rugby sevens and rugby league player. She is currently contracted to the Newcastle Knights in the NRL Women's Premiership. She plays for Chiefs Manawa in the Super Rugby Aupiki competition. She also plays for the Black Ferns sevens internationally and won a gold medal at the Tokyo Olympics.

== Rugby career ==
=== Rugby sevens ===
Willison debuted for the Black Ferns Sevens side in 2016. She competed for New Zealand in the women's sevens tournament at the 2020 Summer Olympics where she won a gold medal.

Willison was named in the Black Ferns Sevens squad for the 2022 Commonwealth Games in Birmingham. She won a bronze medal at the event. She later competed in her second Rugby World Cup Sevens in Cape Town and won a silver medal.

=== Fifteens ===
Willison was signed by Chiefs Manawa for the 2023 Super Rugby Aupiki season. She was selected in the Black Ferns fifteens 30-player squad to compete in the Pacific Four Series and O'Reilly Cup. She made her international debut against Australia on 29 June 2023 at Brisbane.

She returned to the Chiefs Manawa side for the 2025 Super Rugby Aupiki season.

=== Rugby League ===
In August 2024, Willison signed a 2-year contract with the Newcastle Knights in the NRL Women's Premiership competition, starting effective immediately.

On 15 February 2026 she scored two tries for the Māori All Stars in the 14-20 defeat to the Indigenous All Stars in Hamilton, New Zealand.

She made her New Zealand international début in the 2026 Rugby League World Cup 92-0 win over France on 25 October 2026, scoring 2 tries.
