= Mercedez Taulelei-Siala =

Samoa women's international rugby league player

Personal information
- Born: Mercedez Taulelei-Siala; 18 September 2006 (age 20) New Zealand
- Height: 171 cm (5 ft 7 in)
- Weight: 74 kg (11 st 9 lb)

Playing information
- Position: Wing
Club
Years	Team	Pld	T	G	FG	P
2025–	Newcastle Knights	13	14	0	0	56
Representative
Years	Team	Pld	T	G	FG	P
2024–26	Samoa	8	4	0	0	16
- Source: RLP As of 8 November 2026

Mercedez Taulelei-Siala (born 18 September 2006) is a Samoan women's international rugby league player. She plays wing for the Newcastle Knights in the NRLW.

== Career ==
=== Newcastle Knights ===
She made her NRLW debut in round 11 of the 2025 NRL Women's season for the Knights against the St George Illawarra Dragons.

=== Representative ===
She made her international debut for Fetu Samoa in the 2024 Rugby League Pacific Championships in the 30-16 win over Tonga on 19 October 2024.
