= Anna Davies (rugby league) =

England international rugby league footballer

Personal information
- Full name: Anna Mary Davies
- Born: 2 May 1995 (age 31) Leeds, West Yorkshire, England

Playing information
- Position: Wing, Centre
Club
Years	Team	Pld	T	G	FG	P
2021–	Wigan Warriors	64	71	0	0	284
Representative
Years	Team	Pld	T	G	FG	P
2024–	England	7	13	0	0	52
- As of 30 October 2026

Anna Davies is an English rugby league footballer who plays as a wing for Wigan Warriors and the England women's national rugby league team.

== Background ==
Davies had taken up athletics from a young age and was part of Nottingham Athletics Club, competing at U-15 and U-17 levels. At age 17, she stopped athletics after breaking her foot.

Her return to sport came in 2018 after graduating from university with a sports science degree, playing rugby union with Bath in the reserves. After her first season, she passed a trial for the GB Teachers rugby league team for a fixture against the Armed Forces in 2019.

== Club career ==
Davies made her Wigan debut in 2021.

She finished the 2023 season as Wigan's higher try scorer with nine.

In June 2025, Davies scored a try in Wigan's 42–6 victory over St Helens in the 2025 Women's Challenge Cup final. In September, she scored a try against the same opposition in the final round of regular season to lift the League Leaders' Shield; and a month later, in the Super League Grand Final scored a brace in a player of the match performance to help her side be crowned season champions and complete the club's first treble, also against St Helens beating them 18–12.

== International career ==
Davies was called up to England's 2023 post season performance squad, and made her international debut in June 2024 against France, beating them 42–0 in a mid-season international, scoring a brace. In November, Davies scored five in a post-season 82–0 thrashing of Wales. Two good performances earned her a call up for England's 2025 pre-season game against Australia, a game England lost 4–90.

2025's mid-season origin game saw Davies scored for Lancashire, before scoring a brace for England against Wales the following week.

== Club statistics ==
Club	Season	Tier	App	T	G	DG	Pts
Wigan Warriors	2022	Super League	11	7	0	0	28
Wigan Warriors	2023	Super League	14	9	0	0	36
Wigan Warriors	2024	Super League	20	27	0	0	108
Wigan Warriors	2025	Super League	15	20	0	0	80
Wigan Warriors	2026	Super League	4	8	0	0	32
Wigan Warriors	2027	Super League					
Wigan Warriors	Total		64	71	0	0	284
Career total			64	71	0	0	284

== Honours ==
=== Wigan Warriors ===
- Super League
  - Winners (1): 2025
  - League Leader's Shield (1): 2025
- Challenge Cup
  - Winners (1): 2025
- RFL Women's Nines
  - Winners (2): 2024, 2025
  - Runners up (1): 2023
