= Bethan Dainton =

Wales international rugby union & league player

- Born: 12 April 1989 (age 37); Caerphilly, South Wales, United Kingdom
- Military career
- Allegiance: United Kingdom
- Branch: British Army
- Rank: Bombardier
- Unit: 39th Regiment Royal Artillery
- Conflicts: War in Afghanistan (2001–2021)
- Awards: Operational Service Medals for Afghanistan
- Rugby league career

Personal information
- Height: 1.68 m (5 ft 6 in)
- Weight: 66.18 kg (10 st 5.9 lb)

Playing information

Rugby union
- Position: Back row
Club
Years	Team	Pld	T	G	FG	P
	Bristol Bears
	Newport Gwent Dragons
20??–22	Cardiff Harlequins RFC
	Total	0	0	0	0	0
Representative
Years	Team	Pld	T	G	FG	P
2016–21	Wales	8
2021	Barbarian F.C.
	British Army		2	0	0	10

Rugby league
- Position: Second-row, Centre, Wing
Club
Years	Team	Pld	T	G	FG	P
2023–25	Leeds Rhinos	41	19	0	0	52
2026–	Wigan Warriors	11	8	0	0	32
	Total	52	27	0	0	84
Representative
Years	Team	Pld	T	G	FG	P
2022–26	Wales	12	4	0	0	16
202?–	British Army			0	0
- As of 1 November 2026

Bethan Dainton (born 12 April 1989) is a Welsh rugby footballer who has represented Wales in rugby union and rugby league. She currently plays rugby league as a loose forward for Wigan Warriors in the RFL Women's Super League and is the captain of the Wales women's national rugby league team.

Dainton formerly played rugby union as back row for the Wales women's national rugby union team and Harlequins Women in the Allianz's Premier 15s. She made her debut for the Wales national squad in 2016, and represented them at the 2021 Women's Six Nations Championship.

== Rugby union career ==
=== Club career ===
Dainton has a long-established sporting career, having represented Wales in athletics and cross country in both Union and league codes. However, she did not begin playing rugby until 2015, when she was invited to play for the Dragon's sevens team by Wales player Gemma Rowland.

Dainton then played for Bristol Bears before signing with her current club, Harlequins Women in the Premier 15s.

=== International career ===
After joining the Dragon's sevens team in 2015, Dainton represented Wales in both legs of the Rugby Europe Championship in Russia and France, where she helped Wales secure a place in the Women's Sevens World Series Qualifiers in Dublin, Ireland.

In January 2016, she was named in Wales' 28-woman squad for the 2016 Women's Six Nations Championship, and won her first cap in the opening game against Ireland.

A serious foot injury sustained on international sevens duty kept her out of action for nearly all of the 2017/18 season, and after a lengthy period of rehab she switched from wing to back row. Dainton then returned to the international scene as she was called up for the 2021 Women's Six Nations Championship. in Wales' opening game against France in the 2021 Women's Six Nations Championship

Dainton has won eight caps in her rugby career to date. She has won international caps in both the backs and the forwards.

== Rugby league career ==
Dainton was named as captain of the Wales national rugby league team in October 2023.

On 9 November 2025, she left Leeds Rhinos after three seasons.

In November 2025, she signed for Wigan Warriors in the RFL Women's Super League ahead of the 2026 season.

== Personal life ==
Bombardier Dainton is enlisted in the British Army, serving with the 74th Battery of the 39th Regiment Royal Artillery. Over the winter of 2010–11, she was posted to Afghanistan, where her squadron provided precision artillery support to 16 Air Assault Brigade in Helmand Province. Dainton was one of 71 soldiers to be awarded their Operational Service Medals for Afghanistan at a ceremony in Newcastle in March 2011.
