= Maria Paseka (rugby league) =

Fiji women's international rugby league player

Personal information
- Born: Maria Paseka; 15 January 2006 (age 20) Suva, Fiji
- Height: 165 cm (5 ft 5 in)
- Weight: 64 kg (10 st 1 lb)

Playing information
- Position: Wing
Club
Years	Team	Pld	T	G	FG	P
2024–	St. George Illawarra Dragons	15	6	6	0	36
Representative
Years	Team	Pld	T	G	FG	P
2025–26	Fiji	5	6	0	0	24
- Source: RLP As of 8 November 2026

Maria Paseka (born 15 January 2006) is a Fiji women's international rugby league player. She plays wing for the St. George Illawarra Dragons in the NRLW.

== Career ==
=== St. George Illawarra Dragons ===
She made her NRLW debut in round 5 of the 2024 NRL Women's season for the Dragons against the Cronulla-Sutherland Sharks.

=== Representative ===
She made her international debut for the Fiji Bulikula in the 2025 against Canada, scoring 3 tries.
