= Tamika Jones =

Australia international rugby union & Fiji international rugby league player

Personal information
- Born: 13 June 2003 (age 23) Campbelltown, New South Wales, Australia
- Height: 1.74 m (5 ft 9 in)

Playing information

Rugby union
- Position: Flanker
Club
Years	Team	Pld	T	G	FG	P
20??–25	Western Force					0
Representative
Years	Team	Pld	T	G	FG	P
	Australia					0

Rugby league
- Position: Second-row
Club
Years	Team	Pld	T	G	FG	P
2026–	Canterbury-Bankstown Bulldogs	0	0	0	0	0
Representative
Years	Team	Pld	T	G	FG	P
2026	Fiji	1	0	0	0	0
- As of 24 October 2026

Tamika Jones (born 13 June 2003) is an Australian rugby league & rugby union player. She plays for the Canterbury-Bankstown Bulldogs in the NRLW and Fiji.

She has previously played for Western Force in the Super W competition.

== Playing career ==
Jones was named in the Australian team to play Fiji and Japan in two test matches. She played for the Australian Barbarians team against Japan who were on tour in Australia.

Jones was awarded the Rebecca Clough Medal for the women's Super Rugby best and fairest in June 2022. She was then selected to represent the Wallaroos squad at the Pacific Four Series in New Zealand.

=== Canterbury-Bankstown Bulldogs Women ===
On 6 February 2026 it was reported that she had signed for Canterbury-Bankstown Bulldogs in the NRL Women's Premiership

=== Representative ===
She made her Fiji international début in the 2026 Rugby League World Cup 18-12 defeat to New Zealand on 18 October 2026.
