= AS Ayguesvives =

French rugby league team

Club information
- Full name: Association Sportive Ayguesvives

Current details
- Chairman: Benoît Boisserie
- Coach: Sébastien Vuillon (Sénior W) Sébastien Donnadieu(U17 W) Olivier Janzac (U17 M) Matthieu Boulaouad (U15 M)
- Competition: Women Élite 1

Uniforms
Home colours

AS Ayguesvives are a French Rugby league club based in Ayguesvives and was created in 1969 in the south western French region of Haute-Garonne. The women's team compete in the 1st tier Élite 1 league. During the 2025-2026 season, the club countured around 150 members.

== History ==
The club was originally set up as a youth side for boys and girls. From this the club now runs junior sides down to u7s as well as one running senior and one U15/U17s women team and U17s, U15s, U13s for the boys.

In 1990, the cadet's boys team won the title of French champion. It was the first major club title. In the 2022–23 season, the women's team played in Elite 2 championship. The finished top of the table, but lost 50–16 against Baroudeuses de Pia in the final. The 2023–24 season saw the establishment of the Limoux – Ayguesvives team, playing in the women's Elite 1. They lost 30–6 to Lescure in the semi-finals of the play-offs.. During the 2024-2025 season, the U13s boys team won the Paul Nadaï challenge, one of biggest tournaments of their season. The 2025-2026 senior women's season ends with a defeat in Élite 1 final after a remarkable campaign in the competition.
