= Losana Lutu =

Fiji women's international rugby league player

Personal information
- Born: Losana Lutu; 29 April 2004 (age 22) Suva, Fiji
- Height: 172 cm (5 ft 8 in)
- Weight: 85 kg (13 st 5 lb)

Playing information
- Position: Halfback
Club
Years	Team	Pld	T	G	FG	P
2022	Parramatta Eels	1	0	0	0	0
2023–	Wests Tigers	25	4	3	0	22
	Total	26	4	3	0	22
Representative
Years	Team	Pld	T	G	FG	P
2024–26	Fiji	6	3	0	0	12
- Source: RLP As of 8 November 2026

Losana Lutu (born 29 April 2004) is a Fiji women's international rugby league player. She plays halfback for the Wests Tigers in the NRLW.

== Career ==
=== Parramatta Eels ===
She made her NRLW debut in round 1 of the 2022 NRL Women's season for the Eels against the Sydney Roosters.

=== Representative ===
She made her international debut for the Fiji Bulikula in the 2024 Rugby League Pacific Championships against the Cook Islands.
