= Rugby league at the Pacific Games =

Rugby league at the Pacific Games was introduced in 2007 at Apia in Samoa. Rugby league nines is the form of the game currently played at the Pacific Games. The 7-a-side version of the game was played at the 2009 Pacific Mini Games.

== Men's summaries ==
Year	Host	Final			Bronze medal match			Ref
Year	Host	Gold medal	Score	Silver medal	Bronze medal	Score	Fourth place	Ref
2007	(Samoa); Apia	Fiji	14–0	Cook Islands	Samoa	20–10	Tonga
2015	(Papua New Guinea); Port Moresby	Papua New Guinea	38–10	Samoa	Tonga	16–14	Fiji
2019	(Samoa); Apia	Fiji	14–0	Papua New Guinea	Samoa	16–12	Tonga
2023	(Solomon Islands); Honiara	Samoa	8–0	Fiji	Cook Islands	16–7	Tonga

== Women's summaries ==
Year	Host	Final			Bronze medal match			Ref
Year	Host	Gold medal	Score	Silver medal	Bronze medal	Score	Fourth place	Ref
2019	(Samoa); Apia	Fiji	16–14	Papua New Guinea	Cook Islands	24–10	Samoa
2023	(Solomon Islands); Honiara	Cook Islands	16–8	Tonga	Fiji	4–0	Samoa

== Medal table ==
The all-time medal standings for rugby league at the Pacific Games, including the South Pacific Games, from 2007–present is collated in the table below. This includes both men's and women's events.

All-time medal table – Pacific Games rugby league nines
Rank	Nation	Gold	Silver	Bronze	Total
1	Fiji	3	1	1	5
2	Papua New Guinea	1	2	0	3
3	Cook Islands	1	1	2	4
3	Samoa	1	1	2	4
5	Tonga	0	1	1	2
Totals (5 entries)		6	6	6	18

== Pacific Mini Games ==
The 2009 Pacific Mini Games was/is the only Mini-Games to have had rugby league (sevens) included on the programme. It was only the men's tournament that was contested.

Year	Host	Final			Bronze medal match			Ref
Year	Host	Gold medal	Score	Silver medal	Bronze medal	Score	Fourth place	Ref
2009	(Cook Islands); Rarotonga	Fiji	20–14	Cook Islands	Samoa	26–24	Tonga
