= Rugby league in Samoa =

- Country: Samoa
- Governing body: Rugby League Samoa
- National team(s): Men's; Women's
- First played: 1980s

International competitions
- Rugby League World Cup; Rugby League Four Nations

Rugby league is a popular team sport in Samoa.

== History ==
The Western Samoan national team was formed to enter the 1986 Pacific Cup.

During the Super League war, Samoa joined the News Corp-backed Super League in June 1995.

== National teams ==
The men's national team was formed in 1986 to enter the 1986 Pacific Cup. They have competed at six Rugby League World Cups (1995, 2000, 2008, 2013, 2017, 2021). Samoa were runners-up in the 2021 competition, losing 10–30 to Australia in the final.

The women's national team was formed in 2003 for the 2003 Women's Rugby League World Cup. They competed at their second World Cup in 2008.

== See also ==
- Rugby League Samoa
