= Women's Rugby League World Cup =

International women's rugby league tournament

- Upcoming tournament 2026 Women's Rugby League World Cup
- Sport: Rugby league
- Instituted: 2000
- Number of teams: 8
- Region: International (IRL)
- Holders: Australia (2026)
- Most titles: Australia (4 titles)
- Broadcast partner: Seven Network
- Related competition: Men's Rugby League World Cup; Wheelchair Rugby League World Cup

The Women's Rugby League World Cup is an international rugby league tournament, contested by the women's national teams of the International Rugby League (IRL). The competition has been held since 2000 and was incorporated into the Festival of World Cups in 2008 until 2017 when it became a centrepiece event along with the men's competition. Under the current format, eight teams are separated into two groups of four with the top two in each group qualifying for the semi-finals.

Throughout the seven editions, the Women's Rugby League World Cup has been won by two teams. Australia has won the title four times whilst New Zealand has won three times.

The latest edition of World Cup was the 2026 tournament held in Australia, New Zealand and Papua New Guinea. Australia are the tournament's current champions. The next edition will be in 2030, held in the United States.

== History ==
=== Background ===
Women's Rugby League had been played in both Oceania and the United Kingdom for several years but it was not until 1985 in Britain and 1993 in Australia and New Zealand where female only organizations and governing bodies were established and while the Rugby Football League recognized the British women in 1985 it took another five years for the Australian Rugby League to officially recognize the Australian Women's Rugby League. New Zealand Women's Rugby League were officially recognized by the governing body New Zealand Rugby League Inc in 1995. This is partially the reason for no Women's World Cup being held until the year 2000 when these organizations collectively came together to organize it.

=== Tournaments ===
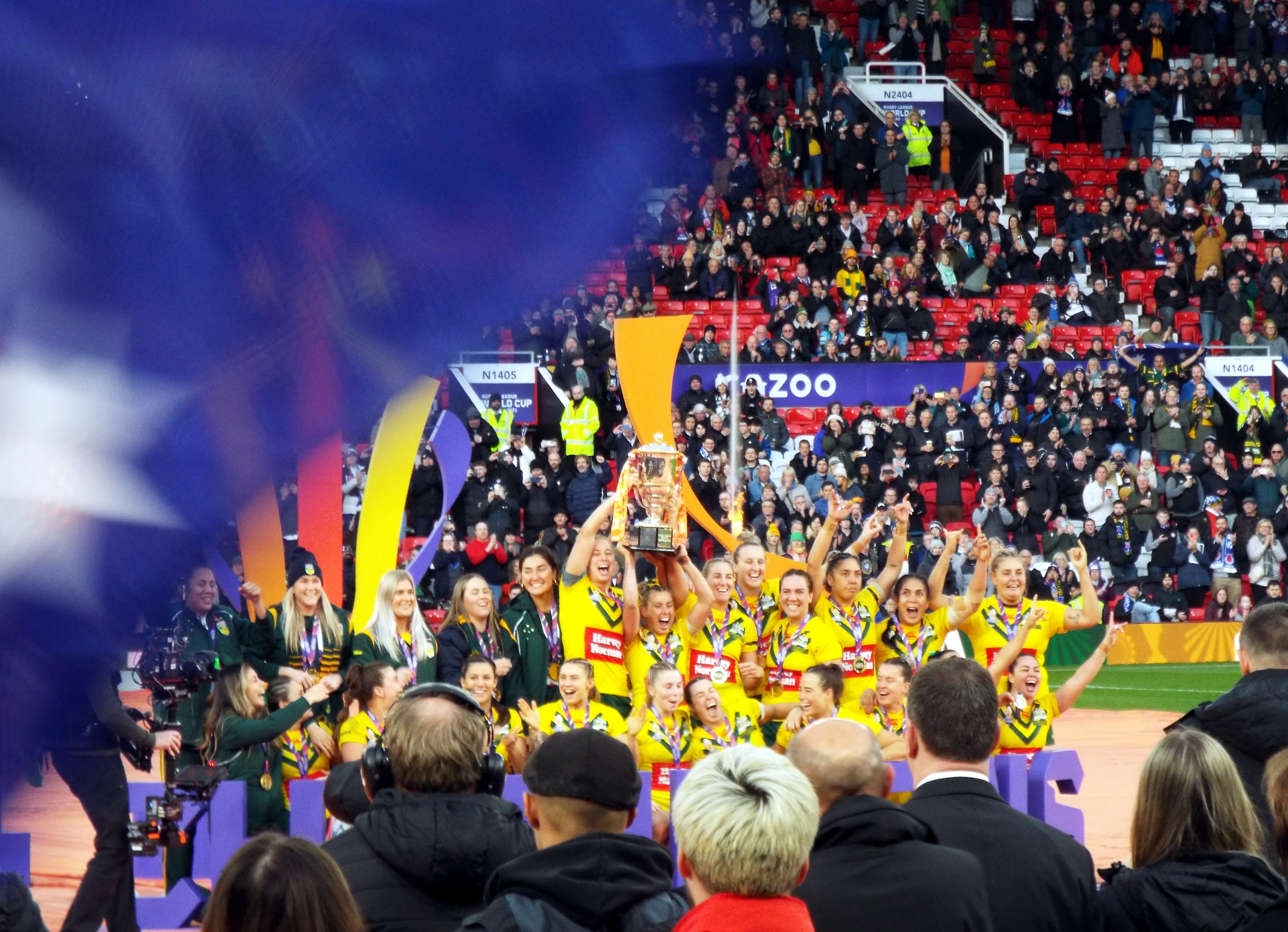
Australia after winning the 2021 Rugby League World Cup

The 2000 World Cup was held in England. The final was contested between Great Britain and New Zealand with New Zealand being crowned champions by a score of 26–4.

The 2003 World Cup was held in Albany, New Zealand and was contested by teams from Australia, Great Britain, Tokelau, Tonga, Cook Islands, Niue, Samoa, New Zealand Māori and New Zealand. New Zealand would eventually win the competition, beating New Zealand Maori by a score of 58–0. New Zealand went through the tournament unbeaten with only four points scored against them.

The 2008 World Cup was held was held in Australia, with all matches at Sunshine Coast Stadium apart from the final, which was held at Lang Park in Brisbane. Teams from Australia, New Zealand, England, Samoa, Tonga, Pacific Islands, France and Russia participated in the tournament. This was the first tournament in which Great Britain didn't participate, their place being taken by England. It was also the first tournament to feature more than one team from Europe with France and Russia. To date, this is the only tournament that Russia has participated in. New Zealand won the 2008 World Cup defeating Australia 34–0 in the final. Up to this point, New Zealand had won all three world cups that had been held.

The 2013 World Cup was held in England with all four venues being in the county of West Yorkshire. For the tournament, the number of teams was reduced from eight to just four with Australia, New Zealand, England and France taking part. France performed particularly poorly in the competition, conceding 202 points in their three games and scoring just 4. The final was held at Headingley Stadium, Leeds and was contested by Australia and New Zealand. Australia won by a score of 22–12 to win their first world cup.

The 2017 World Cup was held in Australia, with all matches at Endeavour Field in Cronulla, New South Wales apart from the final, which was held at Lang Park in Brisbane, Queensland. The number of teams was increased from the previous tournament to 6. Despite taking part in the previous two tournaments, France did not feature, making England the sole representative of Europe. For the first time in the tournament's history, Canada would take part thus becoming the first team from North America to feature. Canada performed well, beating Papua New Guinea and reaching the semi-finals, eventually losing 58–6 to Australia. For the first time, the final was held as a double-header with the men's World Cup final with Australia defending their title by beating New Zealand by a score of 23–16.

On 18 July 2019, the teams for the 2021 World Cup were announced with the tournament being expanded once again to eight teams. The tournament was played alongside the men's and wheelchair competitions and took place in England. Teams from England, France, Australia, New Zealand, Cook Islands, Papua New Guinea, Canada and Brazil took part. For the first time, teams from four different continents will play in the competition. The inclusion of Brazil means a team from South America will take part in for the first time in any Rugby League World Cup. For the first time, all matches of the tournament would be broadcast live.

In May 2023, France withdrew as the host of the 2025 World Cup. As a result, in August, it was announced the tournament would be postponed until 2026. During this announcement, International Rugby League stated that 2026 will be the last World Cup that is held alongside the men's tournament, and starting in 2028 the women's tournament would be its own event. This decision was reversed in December 2025.

== Format ==
In 2000 three teams participated. There had been an intention that New Zealand Maori would participate as a fourth team, however this did not happen. In 2003 nine teams participated, initially in three groups of three. The top two teams in each pool progressed to a second phase, with the six teams divided into two pools. The bottom three teams from the first phase played a round-robin of consolation matches. After the second phase, the top two teams from each second phase pool entered the semi-finals.

In 2008, the eight teams was split into two groups of four with the top two of each group progressing through semi-final and final rounds. The 2013 tournament saw a change in the format with the reductions of teams to four meant that there was only one group with the top two qualifying for the final. The following edition saw the return to a two-group format with the six teams being separated in two groups of three with an inter-group game so that they have still played three games as in previous tournaments. The semi-final round will be brought back for this tournament with the bottom team of each group being eliminated at the first stage.

== Results ==
Year	Host	Final			Third place playoff/Losing semi-finalists (Note: No third place play-off has been played since 2013; losing semi-finalists are listed by order of general campaign.)			Number of teams
Year	Host	Winners	Score and Venue	Runners-up	Third place	Score	Fourth place	Number of teams
2000	United Kingdom	New Zealand	26–4; Wilderspool, Warrington	Great Britain	Australia			3
2003	New Zealand	New Zealand	58–0; North Harbour Stadium, Albany	New Zealand Maori	Australia and Great Britain			9
2008	Australia	New Zealand	34–0; Lang Park, Brisbane	Australia	England	24–0; Stockland Park, Sunshine Coast	Pacific Islands	8
2013	England	Australia	22–12; Headingley, Leeds	New Zealand	England	54–0; South Leeds Stadium, Leeds	France	4
2017	Australia	Australia	23–16; Lang Park, Brisbane	New Zealand	Canada and England			6
2021 (Note: Postponed to 2022 due to the COVID-19 pandemic)	England	Australia	54–4; Old Trafford, Manchester	New Zealand	England and Papua New Guinea			8
2026 (Note: Intended for 2025, but postponed due to the withdrawal of France as hosts nation.)	Australia (Note: Australia are the host nation but some games will be played in Papua New Guinea and New Zealand)	Australia	34–10; Lang Park, Brisbane	New Zealand	Samoa and Fiji			8

=== Summary ===
Australia and New Zealand have been the most successful teams in the tournament's history, winning all 6 of the 6 World Cups that have been staged between them, with Australia coming out on top in the last three tournaments beating New Zealand in each of the 3 finals. In two of the finals (2005, 2008) NZ would even prevent their opponents from scoring, with the 2005 final seeing a devastation of the New Zealand Maori team by 58 points. New Zealand in turn would be crushed 54 - 4 by Australia in the 2022 final.

In the first two World Cups, the home nations competed as Great Britain just as they did in the men's equivalent tournament up to the expansion of the competition in 1995. Since then, England have competed in GB's place. The 2005 tournament is the only one that has not been run alongside the men's tournament, all of the others taking place at the same time and using some of the same stadiums. The 2017 final was significant in that it was the first final to be played as a curtain-raiser to the men's final, this final taking place at Suncorp Stadium, Brisbane.

Teams reaching the top four
Team	Titles	Runners-up	Losing Semi-finalists
Australia	4 (2013, 2017, 2021, 2026)	1 (2008)	2 (2000, 2003)
New Zealand	3 (2000, 2003, 2008)	3 (2013, 2017, 2021, 2026)	
Great Britain		1 (2000)	
New Zealand Māori		1 (2003)	
England			4 (2008, 2013, 2017, 2021)
Pacific Islands			1 (2008)
France			1 (2013)
Canada			1 (2017)
Papua New Guinea			1 (2021)
Fiji			1 (2026)
Samoa			1 (2026)

== Debut of national teams ==
Year	Nation(s)	Total
2000	Australia (United Kingdom) (Ireland) Great Britain; New Zealand	3
2003	Cook Islands; New Zealand Māori; Niue; Samoa; Tokelau; Tonga	6
2008	England; France; Pacific Islands; Russia	4
2013	(none)	0
2017	Canada; Papua New Guinea	2
2021	Brazil	1
2026	Fiji; Wales	2

== Media coverage ==
Year	Country	Broadcaster	Matches
2017	Australia	Seven Network	All 12 matches live
2017	New Zealand	Sky Sport	All 12 matches live
2017	Papua New Guinea	EMTV	All 12 matches live
2021	United Kingdom	BBC	All 15 matches live
2026	Australia	Seven Network	All 15 matches live

== See also ==
- Women's rugby league
- Men's Rugby League World Cup
- Wheelchair Rugby League World Cup
- Women's Rugby League European Championship
- Women's Rugby World Cup
