= Rugby league in Tonga =

- Country: Tonga
- Governing body: Tonga National Rugby League (until 2019); Tonga Rugby League XIII (from 2024)
- National teams: Men's; Women's
- First played: 1980s

International competitions
- Rugby League World Cup

Rugby league is a popular team sport played in Tonga.

== History ==
The Tongan national team was formed to enter the 1986 Pacific Cup.

A domestic competition consisting of six clubs was launched in 1988.

During the Super League war, Tonga joined the News Corp-backed Super League in June 1995.

In February 2020, Tonga National Rugby League were expelled from the International Rugby League (IRL) following refusal to enact necessary changes after the conclusion of an investigation by the IRL. Said investigation came after Semisi Sika, then acting Prime Minister of Tonga, wrote to IRL expressing concerns that he had lost confidence in the governing body. The expulsion did not affect the national team as the IRL had ordered Tonga to fulfil a fixture with Great Britain which was arranged before the investigation, setting a precedent for future matches, a game which Tonga National Rugby League wanted removed from official test records (despite winning) as they were not governing the national team.

In Autumn 2023, Tonga became the first Pacific Island Nation to tour a European Nation with their tour of England.

On 22 August 2024, Tonga were re admitted to the IRL under the new governance of Tonga Rugby League XIII.

== Competitions ==
The Tongan rugby league competition comprises 12 teams in the first division, and 7 in the second. Following the 2017 Rugby League World Cup, the competition was renamed the Jason Taumalolo Cup. Age-restricted competitions were also named for Manu Vatuvei, Solomone Kata, Konrad Hurrell and Tuimoala Lolohea.

The 12 teams in the first division are:

- Capital Warriors
- Fuekafa Rabbitohs
- Ha'akame Broncos
- Ha'ateiho Spartans
- Halaloto Green Barbarians
- Havelu Bulldogs
- Kolomotu'a Eagles
- Lapaha Knights
- Lavengamalie Hurricanes
- Mu'a Saints
- Nakolo Raiders
- Silapeluua Crusaders
- Vaini Doves A

The 7 teams in the second division are:

- Ha'ateiho Crusaders
- Hihifo Rovers
- Houma Tigers
- Kolomu'a Warriors
- Puke-Hofa Turtles
- Silapeluua Crusaders
- Vaini Doves B

=== Participation ===
==== First and Second Division ====
There are 10 first division sides in the Global Insurance Cup and there are 9 in the second division. Only Kolomu'a Warriors (One of two Nuku'alofa Clubs) and the Vaini Doves have first and second division sides. The First Division sides have been, to a greater extent, regular participants in the competition since the inception of League in 1988. Those sides are Kolomu'a, Vaini, Mu'a Saints, Silapeluua (Ha'ateiho) Crusaders, Lapaha Knights, Ha'akame Broncos, Hihifo Rovers, Havelu Bulldogs, Halaloto Barbarians and Nakolo Raiders. The Second Division consists of a number of clubs that have participated infrequently over a number of years. However, regulars in the Second Division are Fatumu, Ha'ateiho Spartans and Ngalukilo Stormers.

The most recent competition (2013) was won by the Kolomua Warriors who defeated the Ha'akame Broncos in the grand final at Teufaiva Stadium in front of approximately 2 000 spectators.

==== School Competition ====
Secondary Schools Competition started in 2007 with 5 teams in the under 18s competition and 8 teams in the Under 16s. Takuilau High School won the Under 18s competition and Liahona High School won the Under 16s competition. It is the largest number of teams and players participating in rugby league in Tongan history, with the National Schools Committee starting the Under 12s, Under 14s and Under 15s in 2008.

In 2013 the Secondary Schools Competition featured 8 schools with teams competing in Under 13s, Under 15s, Under 17's and Open's competitions. Tupou High School finished open age champions with Tonga College winning the U17's and Tupou College winning the Under 15's and U13's competition. Primary school rugby league was also introduced with Maufanga/Fanga and ACTS Community School winning the inaugural tournaments.

TNRL estimate that there are roughly 3,560 players playing rugby league in Tonga for 2025.

== National teams ==
The men's national team was formed in 1986 to enter the 1986 Pacific Cup. They have competed at five Rugby League World Cups (1995, 2000, 2008, 2013, and 2017). They achieved their best result as semi-finalists in 2017.

The women's national team was formed in 2003 for the 2003 Women's Rugby League World Cup. They competed at their second World Cup in 2008.

== See also ==
- Tongan National Rugby League
- Tonga National Rugby League
