= Kellie Kiwi =

NZ international rugby union & league player

- Born: 13 January 1972 (age 54) Tauranga, Bay of Plenty Region, New Zealand
- Height: 1.54 m (5 ft 1/2 in)
- Weight: 56 kg (123 lb; 8 st 11 lb)

Rugby union career
- Position: Halfback
Amateur team(s)
Years	Team	Apps	(Points)
- Papamoa /Te Puke
International career
Years	Team	Apps	(Points)
1996–1998	New Zealand	8	(15)
National sevens team
Years	Team		Comps
- New Zealand
- Rugby league career

Playing information
Representative
Years	Team	Pld	T	G	FG	P
2003	NZ Māori	1	1	1	0	6
- As of 18 November 2026
Medal record
Representing New Zealand
Women's rugby union
Rugby World Cup
Gold medal – first place	1998 Netherlands	Team competition

Kellie Kiwi (born January 13, 1972) is a former New Zealand rugby union and rugby league player.

== Rugby union career ==
She represented New Zealand at the 1998 Women's Rugby World Cup.

She was captain of the women's sevens team that won the 2004 Hong Kong Women's Sevens. Kiwi played for the Bay of Plenty.

== Rugby league career ==
On 8 October 2003 she scored a try and goal for NZ Māori in the 46-0 win over Cook Islands in North Harbour Stadium, Auckland
