= Samoa women's national rugby league team =

Samoa
Team information
- Nickname: Fetū Sāmoa
- Governing body: Rugby League Samoa
- Region: Oceania
- Head coach: Frank Pritchard
- Captain: Annetta Nu'uausala
- IRL ranking: 5 (20 August 2026)

Uniforms
First colours

Team results
- First international
- Samoa vs Great Britain; North Harbour Stadium, Albany, NZ; 28 September 2003
- Biggest win
- Samoa 76 — 0 Wales; Commbank Stadium, Parramatta, Australia; 23 October 2026
- Biggest defeat
- Samoa 0 — 84 New Zealand; North Harbour Stadium, Albany, NZ; 6 October 2003
- World Cup
- Appearances: 3
- Best result: Semi-Finalist (2026)

The Samoa women's national rugby league team (Samoan: ʻau lakapī līkī tamaʻitaʻi o Sāmoa), nicknamed the Fetū Sāmoa (Samoan: [feˈtuː saːˈmo.a]; lit. 'Samoan Stars'), represents Samoa in Women's rugby league. They are administered by the Rugby League Samoa.

Fetu Samoa has made appearances at the 2003 and 2008 Women's Rugby League World Cup's. Samoa's last international Test Match was against the New Zealand Kiwi Ferns in June 2019, Auckland, New Zealand.

== Head to head records ==
| Opponent | FM | MR | M | W | D | L | Win% | PF | PA | Share |
|---|---|---|---|---|---|---|---|---|---|---|
| Great Britain | 2003 | 2003 | 1 | 0 | 0 | 1 | 0.00% | 12 | 28 | 30.00% |
| Tonga | 2003 | 2024 | 3 | 3 | 0 | 0 | 100.00% | 114 | 20 | 85.07% |
| New Zealand | 2003 | 2026 | 6 | 0 | 0 | 6 | 0.00% | 40 | 238 | 14.39% |
| Australia | 2003 | 2026 | 4 | 0 | 0 | 4 | 0.00% | 26 | 182 | 12.50% |
| Niue | 2003 | 2003 | 1 | 1 | 0 | 0 | 100.00% | 24 | 18 | 57.14% |
| Cook Islands | 2003 | 2003 | 1 | 1 | 0 | 0 | 100.00% | 28 | 18 | 60.87% |
| Pacific Islands | 2008 | 2008 | 1 | 0 | 0 | 1 | 0.00% | 22 | 26 | 45.83% |
| France | 2008 | 2008 | 1 | 1 | 0 | 0 | 100.00% | 32 | 0 | 100.00% |
| Russia | 2008 | 2008 | 1 | 1 | 0 | 0 | 100.00% | 52 | 8 | 86.67% |
| Fiji | 2023 | 2024 | 2 | 2 | 0 | 0 | 100.00% | 42 | 24 | 63.64% |
| Papua New Guinea | 2024 | 2024 | 1 | 1 | 0 | 0 | 100.00% | 34 | 12 | 73.91% |
| Wales | 2026 | 2026 | 1 | 0 | 0 | 0 | 100.00% | 76 | 0 | 100.00% |
| England | 2026 | 2026 | 1 | 0 | 0 | 0 | 100.00% | 24 | 6 | 80.00% |
| Totals | 2003 | 2026 | 24 | 12 | 0 | 12 | 50.00% | 526 | 580 | 47.56% |

Notes:

- Table last updated 8 November 2026.
- Share is the portion of "For" points compared to the sum of "For" and "Against" points.

== Coaches ==
The current Fetu Samoa head coach is Frank Pritchard.

| Name | Tests | | | | | | Nines | | | | | | Ref. |
| Name | Span | M | W | D | L | W% | Span | M | W | D | L | W% | Ref. |
|---|---|---|---|---|---|---|---|---|---|---|---|---|---|
| George Apelu-Tuimaseve | 2003 | 6 | 3 | 0 | 3 | 50% | N/A | | | | | | |
| Tavita Solomona | 2008 | 5 | 2 | 0 | 3 | 40% | N/A | | | | | | |
| Frank Fuimaono | 2011 | 1 | 0 | 0 | 1 | 0% | 2018 | 4 | 2 | 0 | 2 | 50% | |
| Glenn Brailey | 2019 | 1 | 0 | 0 | 1 | 0% | N/A | | | | | | |
| Jeff Tapuala | N/A | | | | | | 2019 | 4 | 1 | 0 | 3 | 25% | |
| Ross Uele | 2020 | 1 | 0 | 0 | 1 | 0% | N/A | | | | | | |
| Jamie Soward | 2023-25 | 6 | 4 | 0 | 2 | 67% | N/A | | | | | | |
| Frank Pritchard | 2026 | 4 | 2 | 0 | 2 | 50% | N/A | | | | | | |

Notes:

- As of 8 November 2026
- The team’s first-ever coach was George Apelu-Tuimaseve, a member of the inaugural Samoa national men’s rugby league team, then representing Western Samoa, in 1986. Lifetime member of the Richmond Rovers Rugby League Club in Grey Lynn, Auckland. He was the son of the late Reverend Apelu Tuimaseve, who established the Samoan Methodist Church in New Zealand and Australia, and the father of former Labour Party politician and candidate Kurt George Taogaga. Apelu-Tuimaseve is also the grand-uncle of All Blacks rugby union player Siale Lauaki, who made his international debut against the Stormers on 8 August 2026. Through a former partner, with whom he had two children, he was also connected to former New Zealand Warriors player Hitro Okesene.

== Current squad ==
The Fetu Samoa squad for the 2026 Rugby League World Cup was announced on 6 October 2026.

Jersey number in the table reflect the team selected for the Semi-Final match against New Zealand.

Players' ages are as at the date that the table was last updated, 31 October 2026.

| J# | Player | Age | Position(s) | Fetu Samoa | | | | | | 2026 Club | NRLW | | | | | | Other Reps |
| J# | Player | Age | Position(s) | Dbt | M | T | G | F | Pts | 2026 Club | CM | TM | T | G | F | Pts | Other Reps |
|---|---|---|---|---|---|---|---|---|---|---|---|---|---|---|---|---|---|
| 1 | Destiny Mino-Sinapati | 21 | Fullback | 2023 | 7 | 3 | 0 | 0 | 12 | Titans | 17 | 17 | 9 | 0 | 0 | 36 | 1 |
| 2 | Mercedez Taulelei-Siala | 20 | Wing | 2024 | 8 | 4 | 0 | 0 | 16 | Knights | 13 | 13 | 14 | 0 | 0 | 56 | — |
| 3 | Monica Tagoai | 28 | Centre | 2026 | 4 | 1 | 0 | 0 | 4 | Bulldogs | 18 | 18 | 12 | 0 | 0 | 48 | — |
| 4 | Tyra Ekepati | 19 | Centre | 2026 | 3 | 3 | 0 | 0 | 12 | Dragons | 0 | 13 | 3 | 0 | 0 | 12 | — |
| 19 | Anastasia Leatupue | 18 | Wing | 2026 | 1 | 0 | 0 | 0 | 0 | Roosters | 0 | 0 | 0 | 0 | 0 | 0 | — |
| 6 | Evania Isa'ako | 31 | Five-eighth, Second-row | 2024 | 6 | 1 | 0 | 0 | 4 | Titans | 42 | 45 | 21 | 0 | 0 | 84 | 4 6 |
| 7 | Pauline Piliae-Rasabale | 34 | Halfback | 2023 | 9 | 0 | 25 | 0 | 50 | Titans | 7 | 25 | 2 | 28 | 0 | 64 | — |
| 8 | Annetta Nu'uausala | 31 | Prop, Second-row | 2023 | 10 | 3 | 0 | 0 | 12 | Warriors | 0 | 44 | 5 | 0 | 0 | 20 | 14 |
| 9 | Mary-Jane Taito | 18 | Hooker | 2026 | 4 | 0 | 0 | 0 | 0 | Bulldogs | 11 | 11 | 0 | 0 | 0 | 0 | — |
| 10 | Laikha Clarke | 25 | Prop | 2024 | 8 | 1 | 0 | 0 | 4 | Titans | 41 | 41 | 6 | 0 | 0 | 24 | 3 1 |
| 11 | Leilani Wilson | 23 | Second-row, Lock | 2026 | 4 | 0 | 0 | 0 | 0 | Bulldogs | 11 | 11 | 0 | 0 | 0 | 0 | — |
| 12 | Ivana Lolesio | 22 | Second-row | 2026 | 4 | 1 | 0 | 0 | 4 | Titans | 24 | 24 | 3 | 0 | 0 | 12 | 3 |
| 13 | Fanua Rimoni | 19 | Lock, Prop | 2026 | 4 | 1 | 0 | 0 | 4 | Titans | 9 | 9 | 0 | 0 | 0 | 0 | — |
| 14 | Tavarna Papalii | 21 | Lock | 2024 | 8 | 2 | 0 | 0 | 8 | Broncos | 1 | 9 | 0 | 0 | 0 | 0 | 3 |
| 15 | Christabelle Onesemo-Tuilaepa | 22 | Prop | 2026 | 3 | 0 | 0 | 0 | 0 | Warriors | 0 | 7 | 0 | 0 | 0 | 0 | — |
| 16 | Jasmine Solia | 29 | Second-row, Lock | 2024 | 3 | 2 | 0 | 0 | 8 | Titans | 18 | 32 | 3 | 0 | 0 | 12 | 3 |
| 17 | Christian Pio | 26 | Prop, Second-row | 2024 | 4 | 0 | 0 | 0 | 0 | Tigers | 34 | 45 | 4 | 0 | 0 | 16 | 3 2 |
| 18 | Jaydika Tafua | 20 | Second-row | 2025 | 2 | 0 | 0 | 0 | 0 | Sharks | 16 | 16 | 2 | 0 | 0 | 8 | — |
| 20 | Evelyn Roberts | 18 | Hooker | 2026 | 1 | 0 | 0 | 0 | 0 | Bulldogs | 9 | 9 | 2 | 0 | 0 | 8 | — |
| 21 | Jetaya Faifua | 23 | Five-eighth, Fullback | 2024 | 7 | 1 | 0 | 0 | 4 | Tigers | 13 | 31 | 6 | 0 | 0 | 24 | — |
| IJ | Freedom Crichton Ropati | 18 | Wing | 2026 | 3 | 4 | 0 | 0 | 16 | Eels | 1 | 1 | 0 | 0 | 0 | 0 | — |
| 22 | Amanii Misa | 19 | Prop, Second-row | — | 0 | 0 | 0 | 0 | 0 | Broncos | 0 | 0 | 0 | 0 | 0 | 0 | — |
| – | Amber Hall | 31 | Second-row, Prop | 2026 | 2 | 1 | 0 | 0 | 4 | Roosters | 31 | 49 | 16 | 0 | 0 | 64 | 14 |
| IJ | Taliah Fuimaono | 27 | Five-eighth | 2019 | 4 | 0 | 0 | 0 | 0 | Dragons | 0 | 36 | 6 | 0 | 0 | 24 | 3 5 6 |
| IJ | Sarina Masaga | 21 | Centre | 2024 | 6 | 3 | 0 | 0 | 12 | Titans | 17 | 17 | 3 | 0 | 0 | 12 | — |

Notes

- All 23 players initially selected had played in the 2026 NRL Women's season.
- Three members of the squad have previously played for another nation:
  - Australia (2): Fuimaono and Isa'ako.
  - New Zealand (3): Hall, Nu'uausala, and Jasmine Fogavini (Solia).
- Seven squad members have previously played for Australasian based representative teams:
  - Māori All Stars (2): Brill and Clarke.
  - Indigenous All Stars (1): Fuimaono
  - Prime Minister’s XIII (2): Clarke and Pio.
  - Queensland (4): Brill, Isa'ako, Lolesio and Papalii
  - NSW (1): Fuimaono
- Anastasia Leatupue replaced the injured Sarina Masaga between World Cup Rounds 1 and 2. Leatupue was on a development contract with the Sydney Roosters for the 2026 season, but did not play an NRLW game. Leatupue did play seven matches for the Central Coast Roosters in the 2026 NSWRL Women's Premiership season.

== Results ==
=== Full internationals ===
| Date | Opponent | Score | Tournament | Venue | Video | Reports |
|---|---|---|---|---|---|---|
| 28 Sep 2003 | Great Britain | 12–28 | 2003 World Cup | North Harbour Stadium | — | |
| 30 Sep 2003 | Tonga | 44–4 | 2003 World Cup | North Harbour Stadium | — | |
| 6 Oct 2003 | New Zealand | 0–84 | 2003 World Cup | North Harbour Stadium | — | |
| 8 Oct 2003 | Australia | 12–40 | 2003 World Cup | North Harbour Stadium | — | |
| 10 Oct 2003 | Niue | 24–18 | 2003 World Cup | North Harbour Stadium | — | |
| 12 Oct 2003 | Cook Islands | 28–18 | 2003 World Cup | North Harbour Stadium | | |
| 6 Nov 2008 | Tonga | 40–0 | 2008 World Cup | Stockland Park, Sunshine Coast | — | |
| 8 Nov 2008 | Pacific Islands | 22–26 | 2008 World Cup | Stockland Park, Sunshine Coast | | |
| 10 Nov 2008 | New Zealand | 4–26 | 2008 World Cup | Stockland Park, Sunshine Coast | | — |
| 12 Nov 2008 | France | 32–0 | 2008 World Cup | Stockland Park, Sunshine Coast | — | |
| 14 Nov 2008 | Russia | 52–8 | 2008 World Cup | Stockland Park, Sunshine Coast | — | |
| 3 Sep 2011 | Australia | 14–42 | Test Match | Apia Park | — | |
| 22 Jun 2019 | New Zealand | 8–46 | Test Match | Mount Smart Stadium, Auckland | | — |
| 7 Nov 2020 | New Zealand | 8–28 | Test Match | Mount Smart Stadium, Auckland | | |
| 15 Oct 2023 | Fiji | 26–12 | Test Match | Santos Stadium, Port Moresby | | |
| 19 Oct 2024 | Tonga | 30–16 | 2024 Pacific Championship | HFC Bank Stadium, Suva | | |
| 2 Nov 2024 | Fiji | 16–12 | 2024 Pacific Championship | Go Media Stadium, Auckland | | |
| 10 Nov 2024 | Papua New Guinea | 34-12 | 2024 Pacific Championship | CommBank Stadium, Sydney | | |
| 19 Oct 2025 | New Zealand | 20–22 | 2025 Pacific Championship | Go Media Stadium, Auckland | | |
| 26 Oct 2025 | Australia | 0–60 | 2025 Pacific Championship | Suncorp Stadium, Brisbane | | |
| 16 Oct 2026 | Australia | 0–40 | 2026 World Cup | CommBank Stadium, Sydney | | |
| 23 Oct 2026 | Wales | 76-0 | 2026 World Cup | CommBank Stadium, Sydney | | |
| 30 Oct 2026 | England | 24-6 | 2026 World Cup | WIN Stadium, Wollongong | | |
| 7 Nov 2026 | New Zealand | 0–32 | 2026 World Cup | McDonald Jones Stadium, Newcastle | | |

=== Nines ===
| Date | Opponent | Score | Tournament | Venue | Video | Report |
|---|---|---|---|---|---|---|
| 23 Feb 2018 | Fiji | 24–6 | 2018 Commonwealth Championship | Dolphin Stadium, Brisbane | | |
| 23 Feb 2018 | Australia | 4–26 | 2018 Commonwealth Championship | Dolphin Stadium, Brisbane | | |
| 24 Feb 2018 | Tonga | 20–0 | 2018 Commonwealth Championship | Dolphin Stadium, Brisbane | | |
| 24 Feb 2018 | Australia | 8–14 | 2018 Commonwealth Championship | Dolphin Stadium, Brisbane | | |
| 8 Aug 2019 | Cook Islands | 12–16 | 2019 Pacific Games | Apia Park | | |
| 8 Aug 2019 | Solomon Islands | 38–4 | 2019 Pacific Games | Apia Park | | |
| 9 Aug 2019 | Fiji | 4–12 | 2019 Pacific Games | Apia Park | | |
| 9 Aug 2019 | Cook Islands | 10–24 | 2019 Pacific Games | Apia Park | | |
| 20 Nov 2023 | Fiji | 10–22 | 2023 Pacific Games | National Stadium, Honiara | | |
| 20 Nov 2023 | Solomon Islands | 20–8 | 2023 Pacific Games | National Stadium, Honiara | — | |
| 20 Nov 2023 | Cook Islands | 4–20 | 2023 Pacific Games | National Stadium, Honiara | | |
| 21 Nov 2023 | Tonga | 0–18 | 2023 Pacific Games | National Stadium, Honiara | | |
| 21 Nov 2023 | Cook Islands | 28–8 | 2023 Pacific Games | National Stadium, Honiara | | |
| 22 Nov 2023 | Fiji | 0–4 | 2023 Pacific Games | National Stadium, Honiara | | |

== Upcoming fixtures ==
As of 8 November 2026, Fetu Samoa's next fixture is yet to be announced.

== Records ==
=== Margins and streaks ===
Biggest winning margins

| Margin | Score | Opponent | Venue | Date |
|---|---|---|---|---|
| 76 | 76–0 | Wales | CommBank Stadium | 23 October 2026 |
| 44 | 52–8 | Russia | Sunshine Coast Stadium | 14 November 2008 |
| 40 | 40–0 | Tonga | Sunshine Coast Stadium | 6 November 2008 |
| 40 | 44–4 | Tonga | North Harbour Stadium | 30 September 2003 |
| 32 | 32–0 | France | Sunshine Coast Stadium | 12 November 2008 |
| 22 | 34–12 | Papua New Guinea | CommBank Stadium | 10 November 2024 |
| 18 | 24–6 | England | WIN Stadium | 30 October 2026 |
| 14 | 26–12 | Fiji | Santos National Football Stadium | 15 October 2023 |
| 14 | 30–16 | Tonga | HFC Bank Stadium | 19 October 2024 |

Biggest losing margins

| Margin | Score | Opponent | Venue | Date |
|---|---|---|---|---|
| 84 | 0–84 | New Zealand | North Harbour Stadium | 6 October 2003 |
| 60 | 0–60 | Australia | Suncorp Stadium | 26 October 2025 |
| 40 | 0-40 | Australia | CommBank Stadium | 16 October 2026 |
| 38 | 8-46 | New Zealand | Go Media Stadium | 22 June 2019 |
| 28 | 14–42 | Australia | Apia Park | 3 September 2011 |
| 22 | 4–26 | New Zealand | Sunshine Coast Stadium | 10 November 2008 |
| 20 | 8–28 | New Zealand | Go Media Stadium | 7 November 2020 |
| 16 | 12–28 | Great Britain | North Harbour Stadium | 28 September 2003 |

Most consecutive wins

| Matches | First win | Last win | Days | Ended | Days |
|---|---|---|---|---|---|
| 4 | 15 Oct 2023 | 10 Nov 2024 | 1 year, 27 days | 19 Oct 2025 | 2 years, 5 days |

Most consecutive losses

| Matches | First loss | Last loss | Days | Ended | Days |
|---|---|---|---|---|---|
| 3 | 3 Sep 2011 | 7 Nov 2020 | 9 years, 66 days | 15 Oct 2023 | 12 years, 42 days |

== Teams ==
2019 Squad Fetu Samoa vs Kiwi Ferns Saturday 22 June 2019 Mt Smart Stadium, Auckland, New Zealand Result: 8-46 (tries to Billy-Jean Ale & Moana Fineaso-Levi). The last time Fetu Samoa played against the New Zealand Kiwi Ferns team was at the 2008 World Cup in Queensland, Australia losing that match 4-26.

1. Sieni Mose
2. Moana Fineaso-Levi
3. Va'anessa Molia-Fraser
4. Ricshay Lemanu
5. Sarah Togatuki
6. Mikayla Malaki
7. Taliah Fuimaono
8. Emma Young
9. Cesca Luafalealo
10. Elianna Walton (Captain)
11. Christina Pauli
12. Masuisuimatamaalii Tauaua-Pauaraisa
13. Luisa Gago
14. Talia Lealaiauloto
15. Billy-Jean Ale
16. Lauretta Leao-Seve
17. Taimane Levu

Head Coach: Glenn Bailey Assistant Coach: Frank (Sefo) Fuimaono Manager: Liz Akuoi-Atmore

2018 Squad Commonwealth Nines Championship 23-24 February 2018 Moreton Bay, Brisbane, Queensland, Australia It had been 7 years since the Fetu Samoa team last played on the international scene in 2011. In 2018, the team competed at the Women's Commonwealth Nines Championship at the Redcliffe, Queensland, Australia. The team narrowly lost to the Australian Jillaroos in the gold medal match 8-14, coming away with a silver medal. In preparation for this, the team won the annual Cabramatta 9's International tournament in Sydney, Australia on Saturday 3 February 2018.

- Atasi Lafai (Sataua, Saipipi)
- Cecilia Smith (Fasito'o-uta, Nofoali'i)
- Christine Pauli (Faleasiu)
- Christina Tagaloa (Paia, Falelatai)
- Emma-Marie Young (Malaela)
- Lalovi Lealaiaulto (Avau, Lufilufi, Alafua)
- Lauretta Leao-Seve (Fagali'i)
- Luisa Gago (Avao, Fagaloa)
- Maitua Feterika (Solosolo, Lufilufi)
- Mikayla Malaki (Levi, Saleimoa, Falease'ela, Manono, Fasito'o)
- Oneata Schwalger (Lalovaea, Saleaaumua)
- Sarah Togatuki Nogotau (Satalo Falealili, Leulumoega, Nofoalii)
- Shontelle Stowers (Lago)
- Talia Lealaiauloto (Avau, Lufilufi, Alafua)
- Taliah Fuimaono (Nofoali’i, Vailuutai)

Standbys:

- Kristine Vaalepu (Saleimua, Salaaumua)
- Liiah Tagaloa (Paia, Falelatai)

Coach: Frank (Sefo) Fuimaono (Fatausi, Safotulafai) Trainers: Rodney Hall (Toamua, Fasito’o-uta), Anjalee Howlett Physio: Braydon Vo Manager: Sally Va'afusuaga (Faleāse’ela, Tuana’i, Tanugamanono)

=== 2011 squad ===
Fetu Samoa squad that played in a test match against the Jillaroos on 1 September 2011 in Apia, Samoa:

- Luisa Avaiki (c)
- Tolupene (Neta) Peau
- Theresa Malaitai
- Mele Angelia Leuluaialii
- Kally Leota
- Marie Frances Leota
- Seeseei Hellen Tafa
- Sharon Jacinta Chungson
- Cynthia Taala
- Madonna Seifono Schmidt
- Victoria Apulu
- Sarah Faasegi Clayton
- Chloe Leaupepe
- Billy-Jean Ale
- Valerie Leataata Davis
- Alaiumu Sao Taliu
- Aieshaleigh Smalley
- Tasia Seumanufagai
- Vicki Lee Nafanua Campbell
- Foaiina Maria Chong Nee
- Tuiai Elisara
- Karameli Tiffany Faaee
- Unaloto Sili
- Maitua Feterika

=== 2008 World Cup squad ===
The tournament was held in Australia from 26 October, culminating in the final between Australia and New Zealand on 22 November. It was held at Stockland Park alongside the Police World Cup. Eight teams took part including defending champions New Zealand.

1. Marie Leota
2. Esther Fuaivaa
3. Jean Oti
4. Maryann Collins
5. Mele Leuluaiali'i
6. Ake Pereira
7. Kally Leota
8. Tolupene (Neta) Peau (Vice Captain)
9. Maryanne Hemara
10. Iriana Huriwai-Sasulu
11. Sera Clayton (Captain)
12. Theresa Malaitai
13. Rachael Efaraimo
14. Tunufa'i Poulava
15. Serena Curtis-Lemuelu
16. Laine Faapito
17. Fuarosa Time
18. Poto Lemalu-Tuisamoa
19. Maima Tiatia
20. Mate Lefale
21. Justine Lavea
22. Tatiana Tafatu

Head Coach: Tavita Solomona Manager: Jo Toleafoa Trainer / Secretary: May Afoa-Peterson Support Staff: Daisy Va'afusuaga Executive: Sally Va'afusuaga Tour Manager: Tagaloa Fouina Su'a Samoan Official: Unasa Lautofa

== See also ==
- Rugby league in Samoa
- Samoa national rugby league team

== Sources ==
| Acronym | Item | Years | Database App | Notes |
|---|---|---|---|---|
Direct Online Access
| VH, VR | Video Highlights, Replay | 2008–present | YouTube | Match highlights and or full match replays |
| NZRL | New Zealand Rugby League | 1995–present | NZRL website | List of results for New Zealand women's rugby league team |
| NRL | National Rugby League | 2011 | NRL website | 2011 Test versus Australia |
Indirect Online Access (Note: Access through library eResources to database applications housing newspaper and journal content. This may require library membership. As an example, SLNSW eResources requires a membership number, although membership is free to residents of NSW.)
| RLW | Rugby League Week | 2003 | EBSCOhost | Scores for some 2003 World Cup matches. |
| DT | Daily Telegraph | 2003 | Newsbank | Scores for some 2003 World Cup matches. |
| SCD | Sunshine Coast Daily | 2008 | Newsbank | Good coverage of 2008 World Cup |
