= Billy-Jean Ale =

New Zealand rugby league footballer (born 1991)

Personal information
- Born: 8 May 1991 (age 34) Auckland, New Zealand
- Height: 169 cm (5 ft 7 in)
- Weight: 106 kg (16 st 10 lb)

Playing information
- Position: Prop
Club
Years	Team	Pld	T	G	FG	P
2019	New Zealand Warriors	3	0	0	0	0
Representative
Years	Team	Pld	T	G	FG	P
2011–19	Samoa	2	1	0	0	4
2019	New Zealand	1	0	0	0	0
- Source: RLP As of 5 October 2020

Billy-Jean Ale (born 8 May 1991) is a New Zealand rugby league footballer who played for the New Zealand Warriors in the NRL Women's Premiership. Primarily a prop, she has represented Samoa and New Zealand.

== Background ==
Born in Auckland, Ale played her junior rugby league for the Mt Albert Lions.

== Playing career ==
In 2008, at 17-years old, she was a development player in New Zealand's World Cup-winning squad but did not play a game.

In 2011, Ale represented Samoa against Australia in Apia. On 22 June 2019, she represented Samoa in their 8–46 loss to New Zealand, scoring a try.

In September 2019, Ale joined the New Zealand Warriors NRL Women's Premiership team. In Round 1 of the 2019 NRL Women's Premiership, she made her debut for the Warriors in a 16–12 win over the Sydney Roosters.

On 25 October 2019, she made her debut for New Zealand, coming off the bench in an 8–28 loss to Australia.
