= Great Britain women's national rugby league team =

Team representing Great Britain in Women's rugby league

Great Britain Lionesses
Team information
- Nickname: The Lionesses
- Governing body: Rugby Football League
- Region: Europe
- Most caps: Sally Milburn 18
- Top try-scorer: Sally Milburn 9
- Top point-scorer: Brenda Dobek 39

Uniforms
First colours

Team results
- Biggest win
- Great Britain 54 – 0 Tonga (North Harbour, New Zealand, 2 October 2003)
- Biggest defeat
- Great Britain 0 – 44 New Zealand (Christchurch, New Zealand, 29 August 1998)
- World Cup
- Appearances: 2 (first time in 2000)
- Best result: Runner's Up 2000

The Great Britain women's national rugby league team, also known as the Great Britain Lionesses, represents Great Britain in Women's rugby league. They are administered by the Rugby Football League (RFL). The Great Britain Lionesses were runner's up in the 2000 World Cup, beating Australia twice but losing both matches, including the final, against New Zealand. Great Britain placed third in the 2003 World Cup.

The team is now largely defunct with the RFL switching towards home nations representation following the men's 2007 All Golds Tour (a process which began in 1995). The England women's national rugby league team was established ahead of the next world cup in 2008, with Wales making their debut in 2019.

Scotland had not played a women's match to the end of 2024, but in February 2025 announced their intent to establish a women's team with the appointment of coaches and support staff, and an inaugural training session.

== Competitive record ==
=== Head to head records ===
Opponent	FM	MR	M	W	D	L	Win%	PF	PA	Share
Australia	1996	2002	8	5	0	3	62.50%	111	100	52.61%
New Zealand	1998	2003	6	0	0	6	0.00%	24	196	10.91%
Samoa	2003	2003	1	1	0	0	100.00%	28	12	70.00%
Tonga	2003	2003	1	1	0	0	100.00%	54	0	100.00%
Māori	2003	2003	1	0	0	1	0.00%	8	10	44.44%
Cook Islands	2003	2003	1	0	1	0	50.00%	20	20	50.00%
Totals	1996	2003	18	7	1	11	41.67%	245	338	42.02%

=== Test Results ===
Date	Opponent	Score	Tournament	Venue	Video	Report(s)
21 Jul 1996	Australia	14–16	3 Test Series	Phillip Oval, Canberra		
28 Jul 1996	Australia	18–12	3 Test Series	Gilbert Park, Brisbane	—	
3 Aug 1996	Australia	20–18	3 Test Series	Redfern Oval, Sydney		
23 Aug 1998	New Zealand	6–28	3 Test Series	Pukatwhero Park, Rotorua	—	
29 Aug 1998	New Zealand	0–44	3 Test Series	Rugby League Park, Christchurch	—	
4 Sep 1998	New Zealand	2–38	3 Test Series	Carlaw Park, Auckland	—	
7 Nov 2000	New Zealand	12–22	2000 WRLWC	Rugby Ground, Orrell, Greater Manchester	—	
14 Nov 2000	Australia	14–10	2000 WRLWC	Rams Stadium, Dewsbury		
21 Nov 2000	Australia	4–0	2000 WRLWC	The Jungle, Castleford	—	
24 Nov 2000	New Zealand	4–26	2000 WRLWC	Wilderspool, Warrington		
14 Jul 2002	Australia	26–16	3 Test Series	Wentworthville Oval	—	
20 Jul 2002	Australia	10–14	3 Test Series	ANZ Stadium, Brisbane	—	
27 Jul 2002	Australia	5–14	3 Test Series	Bruce Stadium, Canberra, ACT	—	
28 Sep 2003	Samoa	28–12	2003 WRLWC	North Harbour Stadium	—	
2 Oct 2003	Tonga	54–0	2003 WRLWC	North Harbour Stadium	—	
4 Oct 2003	(Māori people) Māori	8–10	2003 WRLWC	North Harbour Stadium	—	
6 Oct 2003	Cook Islands	20–20	2003 WRLWC	North Harbour Stadium	—	
10 Oct 2003	New Zealand	0–38	2003 WRLWC	North Harbour Stadium	—	

Notes:

- A Great Britain women's rugby league team toured France in 1989 but played only touch football games against French women. They did play a tackle match against a men's Under 21 team, losing 4–10.
- As part of their preparations for the 2000 World Cup, Great Britain played two matches against the England Wildcats. Great Britain won the first match 40–12.
- The 2000 World Cup programme lists previous Test series occurring between 1995 and 1999.
- An article previewing the 2007 match between England and France mentions that it was the first international to be played by an English or Great Britain side since the 2003 World Cup.

== Tours ==
=== 1996 Tour of Australia ===
The Great Britain Lionesses toured Australia for the first time in 1996. The team was captained by Lisa McIntosh, with Brenda Dobek as vice-captain. Ian Harris (Hull) was head coach with Jackie Sheldon as assistant coach. Nikki Carter (Hull Vixens) was tour manager. Paula Clark (York) was the touring team's physiotherapist.

Great Britain lost the inaugural Test Match against Australia, but won both of the subsequent two Test Matches to claim a two-one series victory.

1996 Tour of Australia
Date	Opponent	Score	Venue	Notes
16 July 1996	Sydney Select XIII	86-0	Redfern Oval, Sydney	Tour match
18 July 1996	Australian Capital Territory	36-0	Steinfield Oval, Canberra	Tour match
21 July 1996	Australia	14–16	Phillip Oval, Canberra	First Test
24 July 1996	Queensland XIII	22-8	Gilbert Park, Brisbane	Tour match
28 July 1996	Australia	18-12	Gilbert Park, Brisbane	Second Test
31 July 1996	Presidents XIII	30-0	Cunningham Oval, Sydney	Tour match
3 August 1996	Australia	20-18	Redfern Oval, Sydney	Third Test

The playing group consisted of captain Lisa McIntosh (Dudley Hill, squad number 13), vice-captain Brenda Dobek (Wakefield Panthers, squad number 6) and the following: 16. Jill Adams (Redhill), 17. Jane Banks (Wigan St Patricks), 1. Sharon Birkenhead (Redhill), 4. Karen Burrows (Redhill), 5. Wendy Charnley (Rochdale), 20. Julie Cronin (York), 22. Lucy Ferguson (Wakefield Panthers), 7. Mandy Green (Dudley Hill), 18. Nicki Harrison (Dudley Hill), 21. Joanne Hewson (Askam), 15. Lisa Hunter (Hull), 23. Allison Kitchin (Barrow), 3. Liz Kitchin (Barrow), 9. Michelle Land (Wakefield Panthers), 25. Sally Milburn (Askam), 8. Donna Parker (Hull Vixens), 2. Chantel Patricks (Dudley Hill), 24. Samantha Pearson (Dudley Hill), 26. Joanne Roberts (Wakefield Panthers), 11. Lucia Scott (Rochdale), 14. Vicky Studd (Dudley Hill), 19. Paula Tunnicliffe (Rochdale), 12. Sandra Wade (Barrow) and 1. Joanna Will (Wakefield Panthers).

=== 1998 Tour of New Zealand ===
The Great Britain Lionesses toured New Zealand for the first time in 1998. The team was captained by Lisa McIntosh and coached by Jackie Sheldon.

1998 Tour of New Zealand
Date	Opponent	Score	Venue	Notes
16 August 1998	New Zealand Maori	32–4	Auckland	Tour match
19 August 1998	Auckland	20–18	Carlaw Park, Auckland	Tour match
23 August 1998	New Zealand	6–28	Pukatwhero Park, Rotorua	First Test
26 August 1998	Canterbury	20–0	Christchurch	Tour match
29 August 1998	New Zealand	0–44	Rugby League Park, Christchurch	Second Test
4 September 1998	New Zealand	2–38	Carlaw Park, Auckland	Third Test

=== 2002 Tour of Australia ===
In 2002 Great Britain Lionesses toured Australia with sponsorship from Munchies.

2002 Tour of Australia
Date	Opponent	Score	Venue	Notes
14 July 2002	Australian Jillaroos	26–16	Wentworthville Oval, Sydney	1st Test
17 July 2002	Queensland	50–10	Brothers Leagues Club Ground, Ipswich	Tour match
20 July 2002	Australian Jillaroos	10–14	ANZ Stadium, Brisbane	2nd Test
23 July 2002	Canberra/ACT	72–0	Kippax Oval, Canberra	Tour match
27 July 2002	Australian Jillaroos	5–14	Bruce Stadium, Canberra	3rd Test

The playing group, captained by Lisa McIntosh (Bradford Thunderbirds), consisted of Samantha Bailey (Sheffield), Jane Banks (Bradford), Nicola Benstead (Hull Dockers), Teresa Bruce (Bradford Thunderbirds), Sue Cochrane (Wakefield Panthers), Brenda Dobek (Wakefield Panthers), Becky Jones (Hillside Hawks), Alexandra Knight (Keighley), Michelle Land (Wakefield Panthers), Paula McCourt (Wakefield Panthers), Sally Millburn (Barrow), Nikki O'Donnell (Hull Dockers), Natalie Parsons (Bradford Thunderbirds), Chantel Patrick (Bradford Thunderbirds), Nicholette Postlethwaite (Wigan Ladies), Donna Prime (Hull Dockers), Debbie Rice (Hull Dockers), Kirsty Robinson (Bradford Thunderbirds), Amy Robinson (Hull Dockers), Nicola Simpson (Milford Storm), Rebecca Stevens (Sheffield), Danni Titterington (Wakefield Panthers), Gemma Walsh (Wakefield Panthers) and Rachael Wilson (Wakefield Panthers).

The team was coached by Jackie Sheldon, with John Mitchell (Bradford Thunderbirds) and Dylan Reynard (Milford) serving as assistant coaches. The touring party was managed by Roland Davis and Andrew McDonald (Keighley). Elaine Kirton (Whitehaven) was on tour as physiotherapist.

=== 2010s ===
A 2015 Great Britain Lionesses tour of Australasia was approved by the RLIF, however did not occur.
During the decade, England women's teams visited France for away matches, travelled to Australia for the 2017 World Cup and in 2019 toured Papua New Guinea and participated in a four-team international nines competition.

== See also ==
- Great Britain men's national rugby league team
- England women's national rugby league team
- Wales women's national rugby league team
- Ireland women's national rugby league team
