= IRL Women's World Rankings =

Ranking system for women's national teams in rugby league

IRL Women's World Rankings
Official rankings as of August 2026
Rank	Change	Team	Pts %
1	Steady	Australia	100
2	Steady	New Zealand	64
3	Steady	England	40
4	Steady	France	25
5	Steady	Samoa	22
6	Steady	Papua New Guinea	19
7	▲6	Canada	19
8	Steady	Ireland	18
9	▼2	Wales	17
10	Steady	Nigeria	16
11	▼2	Cook Islands	15
12	Steady	Fiji	13
13	▲2	Tonga	12
14	▲2	United States	12
15	▼4	Greece	11
16	▼2	Netherlands	10
17	▲3	Scotland	8
18	▼1	Serbia	4
19	▼1	Kenya	4
20	▼1	Ghana	4
21	▲2	Brazil	3
22	▲2	Jamaica	3
23	▼2	Italy	2
24	▼2	Philippines	2
25	▲1	Lebanon	2
26	▼1	Uganda	1
27	Steady	Malta	1
28	Steady	Turkey	1
Complete rankings at www.internationalrugbyleague.com

The IRL Women's World Rankings are the ranking system for women's national teams in the sport of rugby league football. The rankings were first published in December 2017.

== Current calculation method ==
=== Match status ===
A weighting system has been implemented by the IRL to give more points to teams if they gain a victory over a major team in a major tournament, with friendlies ranked with considerably fewer points than any World Cup finals match or the final of Cups such as the European, Mediterranean and Pacific Cups.

=== Opponent strength ===
The IRL has organized the ranking so that a win against a very highly ranked opponent is a considerably greater achievement than a win against a low-rated opponent, so the strength of the opposing team is a factor.

=== Assessment period ===
All matches played over the last three years are included in the calculation of the rankings, but there is a weighting system implemented to put more emphasis on recent results.

== Historical rankings ==
Team	Dec 2017	Jul 2018	Dec 2018	Jul 2019	Nov 2019	Jun 2020	Dec 2021	Jul 2022	Dec 2022	Jun 2023	Dec 2023	Jun 2024	Dec 2024	Jun 2025	Nov 2025	Dec 2025	Aug 2026
Argentina	–	–	–	–	–	–	–	–	22	22	28 (▼6)	–	–	–	–	–	–
Australia	1	1	1	1	1	1	1	1	1	1	1	1	1	1	1	1	1
Brazil	–	–	–	11	13 (▼2)	13	15 (▼2)	17 (▼2)	10 (▲7)	10	11 (▼1)	12 (▼1)	20 (▼8)	19 (▲1)	23 (▼4)	23	21 (▲2)
Canada	4	4	4	4	5 (▼1)	5	6 (▼1)	6	7 (▼1)	7	7	8 (▼1)	9 (▼1)	10 (▼1)	11 (▼1)	13 (▼2)	7 (▲6)
Cook Islands	5	5	5	5	7 (▼2)	7	12 (▼5)	11 (▲1)	6 (▲5)	6	6	6	10 (▼4)	9 (▲1)	9	9	11 (▼2)
England	3	3	3	3	3	3	3	3	3	3	3	3	3	3	3	3	3
Fiji	–	–	–	9	10 (▼1)	10	9 (▲1)	12 (▼3)	18 (▼6)	19 (▼1)	21 (▼2)	26 (▼5)	16 (▲10)	16	10 (▲6)	12 (▼2)	12
France	7	7	7	7	6 (▲1)	6	5 (▲1)	5	5	4 (▲1)	5 (▼1)	4 (▲1)	4	4	4	4	4
Ghana	–	–	–	–	–	–	–	–	–	–	25	23 (▲2)	24 (▼1)	24	21 (▲3)	19 (▲2)	20 (▼1)
Greece	–	–	–	–	–	14	16 (▼2)	18 (▼2)	11 (▲7)	11	10 (▲1)	9 (▲1)	8 (▲1)	7 (▲1)	13 (▼6)	11 (▲2)	15 (▼4)
Ireland	–	–	–	–	–	–	14	14	8 (▲6)	8	9 (▼1)	10 (▼1)	7 (▲3)	8 (▼1)	8	8	8
Italy	8	8	8	8	8	8	8	13 (▼5)	14 (▼1)	13 (▲1)	15 (▼2)	19 (▼4)	21 (▼2)	22 (▼1)	20 (▲2)	21 (▼1)	23 (▼2)
Jamaica	–	–	–	–	–	–	–	–	–	–	22	24 (▼2)	23 (▲1)	23	25 (▼2)	24 (▲1)	22 (▲2)
Kenya	–	–	–	–	–	–	–	–	–	–	24	20 (▲4)	18 (▲2)	18	18	18	19 (▼1)
Lebanon	9	9	9	14 (▼5)	14	15 (▼1)	17 (▼2)	19 (▼2)	21 (▼2)	21	27 (▼6)	27	27	27	27	26 (▲1)	25 (▲1)
Malta	–	–	–	–	–	–	–	–	16	17 (▼1)	19 (▼2)	21 (▼2)	25 (▼4)	25	28 (▼3)	27 (▲1)	27
Netherlands	–	–	–	–	–	–	–	–	–	–	18	13 (▲5)	13	13	15 (▼2)	14 (▲1)	16 (▼2)
New Zealand	2	2	2	2	2	2	2	2	2	2	2	2	2	2	2	2	2
Nigeria	–	–	–	–	–	–	–	–	–	–	23	18 (▲5)	17 (▲1)	17	12 (▲5)	10 (▲2)	10
Papua New Guinea	6	6	6	6	4 (▲2)	4	4	4	4	5 (▼1)	4 (▲1)	5 (▼1)	5	5	6 (▼1)	6	6
Philippines	–	–	–	–	–	–	–	–	19	14 (▲5)	14	15 (▼1)	19 (▼4)	20 (▼1)	22 (▼2)	22	24 (▼2)
Samoa	–	–	–	10	12 (▼2)	12	11 (▲1)	16 (▼5)	20 (▼4)	20	20	25 (▼5)	11 (▲14)	12 (▼1)	5 (▲7)	5	5
Scotland	–	–	–	–	–	–	–	–	–	–	–	–	–	–	19	20 (▼1)	17 (▲3)
Serbia	–	–	–	13	9 (▲4)	9	7 (▲2)	8 (▼1)	12 (▼4)	12	12	11 (▲1)	12 (▼1)	14 (▼2)	17 (▼3)	17	18 (▼1)
Tonga	–	–	–	–	–	–	–	10	15 (▼5)	16 (▼1)	13 (▲3)	14 (▼1)	15 (▼1)	15	14 (▲1)	15 (▼1)	13 (▲2)
Turkey	–	–	–	12	11 (▲1)	11	10 (▲1)	9 (▲1)	13 (▼4)	15 (▼2)	17 (▼2)	17	26 (▼9)	26	26	28 (▼2)	28
Uganda	–	–	–	–	–	–	–	–	–	–	26	22 (▲4)	22	21 (▲1)	24 (▼3)	25 (▼1)	26 (▼1)
United States	–	–	–	–	–	–	–	15	17 (▼2)	18 (▼1)	16 (▲2)	16	14 (▲2)	11 (▲3)	16 (▼5)	16	14 (▲2)
Wales	–	–	–	–	–	–	13	7 (▲6)	9 (▼2)	9	8 (▲1)	7 (▲1)	6 (▲1)	6	7 (▼1)	7	9 (▼2)

== See also ==
- International Rugby League
- RLIF Awards
- IRL Men's World Rankings
- IRL Wheelchair World Rankings
