= Tonga women's national rugby league team =

Tonga national rugby league team

Tonga
Team information
- Nickname: Mate Ma'a Tonga
- Region: Asia-Pacific
- Head coach: Meg Ward
- Captain: Natasha Penitani
- Home stadium: Teufaiva
- IRL ranking: 13 ▲2 (20 August 2026)

Uniforms
First colours

Team results
- First international
- 4 — 44 Samoa; North Harbour Stadium, Albany, NZ; 30 September 2003
- Biggest win
- 66 — 8 Niue; Mount Smart Stadium, Auckland, NZ; 7 November 2020
- Biggest defeat
- 0 — 54 Great Britain; North Harbour Stadium, Albany, NZ; 2 October 2003
- World Cup
- Appearances: 2 (first time in 2003)

The Tonga women's national rugby league team (Tongan: timi līki ʻakapulu fakafonua fefine ʻa Tonga), is under the former governing body TNRL. The first Tonga women's team was in 2003 and known as the Mate Ma'a Tonga women's team administered by the Tonga National Rugby League (TNRL) body. The newly formed Tonga women's national rugby league incorporated is under the Tongan Government with the national men's team. TNRL are no longer the national administrating body for Tonga Rugby League.

== Head to head record ==
Opponent	FM	MR	M	W	D	L	Win%	PF	PA	Share
Samoa	2003	2024	3	0	0	3	0.00%	20	114	14.93%
Great Britain	2003	2003	1	0	0	1	0.00%	0	54	0.00%
Tokelau	2003	2003	2	0	0	2	0.00%	16	54	22.86%
Niue	2003	2020	2	1	1	0	75.00%	80	22	78.43%
New Zealand	2008	2023	3	0	0	3	0.00%	26	120	17.81%
Pacific Islands	2008	2008	1	0	0	1	0.00%	14	44	24.14%
Russia	2008	2008	1	0	0	1	0.00%	12	24	33.33%
France	2008	2008	1	0	0	1	0.00%	4	34	10.53%
Cook Islands	2025	2026	2	1	0	1	50.00%	60	66	47.62%
Papua New Guinea	2025	2025	1	1	0	0	100.00%	42	6	87.50%
Totals	2003	2026	17	3	1	13	20.59%	274	538	33.74%

Notes:

- Table last updated 11 October 2026.
- Share is the portion of "For" points compared to the sum of "For" and "Against" points.

== Coaches ==
The current Mate Ma'a Tonga head coach is Meg Ward, assisted by Vanessa Foliaki.

Name	Tests						Nines						Ref.
Name	Span	M	W	D	L	W%	Span	M	W	D	L	W%	Ref.
Unknown	2003	5	4	1	0	10%	N/A						
Tara Naite	2008	5	0	0	0	0%	N/A						
Andrew Emelio	N/A						2018	4	2	0	2	50%	
Dion Briggs	2020	1	1	0	0	100%	N/A						
Milton Dymock	2022	1	0	0	1	0%	N/A						
Kelvin Wright	2023-24	2	0	0	2	0%	N/A						
Meg Ward	2025-26	3	2	0	1	67%	N/A						

== Players ==
The Mate Ma'a Tonga squad for the upcoming match against the Cook Islands was announced via social media on 29 September 2026.

Jersey numbers and tallies in the table reflect the match versus Cook Islands Moana on 10 October 2026.

J#	Player	Age	Position(s)	Mate Ma’a Tonga						Club	NRLW						Other Reps
J#	Player	Age	Position(s)	Dbt	M	T	G	F	Pts	Club	CM	TM	T	G	F	Pts	Other Reps
1	Lanulangi Veainu	32	Wing	2023	2	0	0	0	0	Rabbitohs	0	3	0	0	0	0	3
2	Simina Lokotui	20	Wing, Centre	2025	3	2	0	0	8	Bulldogs	17	17	10	0	0	40	—
3	Fane Finau	20	Second-row	2025	3	1	0	0	4	Knights	14	14	6	0	0	24	1
4	Martha Mataele	27	Wing, Centre	2025	3	3	0	0	12	Eels	20	20	9	0	0	36	—
5	Vasaliva Feleti	18	Centre, Wing	2026	1	1	2	0	8	Tigers	0	0	0	0	0	0	—
6	Ace Pollock	19	Second-row, Lock	2026	1	0	0	0	0	Falcons	0	0	0	0	0	0	—
7	Emmanita Paki	23	Fullback, Five-eighth	2024	4	1	7	0	18	Warriors	0	23	5	0	0	20	2
8	Ruby Fifita	25	Prop	2025	3	1	0	0	4	Bears	0	1	0	0	0	0	—
9	Paea Uilou	21	Prop	2024	3	0	0	0	0	Bulldogs	8	8	0	0	0	0	—
10	Kalosipani Hopoate	22	Prop	2022	5	2	0	0	8	Bulldogs	19	43	3	0	0	12	1
11	China Polata	24	Second-row, Centre	2022	3	3	0	0	12	Sharks	9	27	4	0	0	16	1 2
12	Manilita Takapautolo	20	Prop, Second-row	2024	2	1	0	0	4	Sharks	31	31	1	0	0	4	—
13	Amelia Huakau	31	Prop, Lock	2022	5	0	0	0	0	Dragons	0	30	1	0	0	4	—
14	Leilani Kavapalu	—	Hooker, Second-row	2026	1	0	2	0	4	Mounties	0	0	0	0	0	0	—
15	Aliyah Nasio	20	Second-row, Lock	2026	1	0	0	0	0	Roosters	26	26	4	0	0	16	1
16	Eta Sikahele	19	Second-row	2026	1	1	0	0	4	Titans	9	9	0	0	0	0	—
17	Namoe Gesa	18	Centre	2026	1	1	0	0	4	Tigers	8	8	2	0	0	8	—
18	Kaylani Tavita	—	—	2025	1	0	0	0	0	Dragons	0	0	0	0	0	0	—
–	Benji Tova	—	—	—	0	0	0	0	0	—	0	0	0	0	0	0	—
–	Tatiana Finau	22	Second-row	2025	2	0	0	0	0	Jets	0	9	0	0	0	0	—
–	Tiueti Lauhingoa	—	—	—	0	0	0	0	0	—	0	0	0	0	0	0	—

Notes:

- The shading in the Clubs column of the above table indicates players selected from teams outside the 2025 NRLW.
  - Falcons (BMDWP): Aysllin (Ace) Pollock
  - Bears (BMDWP): Fifita
  - Dragons (HNWP): Tavita
  - South Sydney Rabbitohs (HNWP): Veainu
  - Mounties (HNWP): Kavapalu
- Several members of the squad have previously played for other representative teams:
  - Queensland: Paki, Polata
  - NSW City: Hopoate and Nasio.
  - Māori All Stars: Finau
  - New Zealand: Veainu
  - Prime Minister's XIII: Polata

== Results ==
=== Full internationals ===
Date	Opponent	Score	Tournament	Venue	Video	Report(s)
30 Sep 2003	Samoa	4–44	2003 World Cup	North Harbour Stadium	—	
2 Oct 2003	Great Britain	0–54	2003 World Cup	North Harbour Stadium	—	
4 Oct 2003	Tokelau	4–28	2003 World Cup	North Harbour Stadium	—	
8 Oct 2003	Niue	14–14	2003 World Cup	North Harbour Stadium	—	
12 Oct 2003	Tokelau	12–26	2003 World Cup	North Harbour Stadium	—	
6 Nov 2008	Samoa	0–40	2008 World Cup	Stockland Park, Sunshine Coast	—	
8 Nov 2008	New Zealand	4–42	2008 World Cup	Stockland Park, Sunshine Coast		
10 Nov 2008	Pacific Islands	14–44	2008 World Cup	Stockland Park, Sunshine Coast	—	
12 Nov 2008	Russia	12–24	2008 World Cup	Stockland Park, Sunshine Coast	—	
14 Nov 2008	France	4–34	2008 World Cup	Stockland Park, Sunshine Coast	—	
7 Nov 2020	Niue	66–8	Test Match	Mount Smart Stadium, Auckland		
25 Jun 2022	New Zealand	12–50	Test Match	Mount Smart Stadium, Auckland		
21 Oct 2023	New Zealand	10–28	Test Match	Eden Park, Auckland		
19 Oct 2024	Samoa	16–30	2024 Pacific Championship	HFC Bank Stadium, Suva		
25 Oct 2025	Cook Islands	24–42	2025 Pacific Championship	PNG Football Stadium, Port Moresby		
1 Nov 2025	Papua New Guinea	42–6	2025 Pacific Championship	PNG Football Stadium, Port Moresby		
10 Oct 2026	Cook Islands	36–24	Test Match	St Mary's Leagues Stadium, Sydney		

=== Nines ===
Date	Opponent	Score	Tournament	Venue	Video	Report(s)
23 Feb 2018	Canada	8–4	2018 Commonwealth Championship	Dolphin Stadium, Brisbane		
23 Feb 2018	Cook Islands	12–4	2018 Commonwealth Championship	Dolphin Stadium, Brisbane	—	
24 Feb 2018	Samoa	0–20	2018 Commonwealth Championship	Dolphin Stadium, Brisbane	—	
24 Feb 2018	Cook Islands	0–20	2018 Commonwealth Championship	Dolphin Stadium, Brisbane	—	—

== Upcoming fixtures ==
As of 12 October 2026, the next match for Tonga women is yet to be scheduled.

== Records ==
=== Margins and streaks ===
Biggest winning margins

Margin	Score	Opponent	Venue	Date
58	66–8	Niue	Go Media Stadium	7 Nov 2020
36	42–6	Papua New Guinea	Santos Stadium	1 Nov 2025

Biggest losing margins

Margin	Score	Opponent	Venue	Date
54	0–54	Great Britain	North Harbour Stadium	2 Oct 2003
40	4–44	Samoa	North Harbour Stadium	30 Sep 2003
40	0–40	Samoa	Sunshine Coast Stadium	6 Nov 2008
38	12–50	New Zealand	Go Media Stadium	25 June 2022
38	4–42	New Zealand	Sunshine Coast Stadium	8 Nov 2008
30	14–44	Pacific Islands	Sunshine Coast Stadium	10 Nov 2008
30	4–34	France	Sunshine Coast Stadium	14 Nov 2008

Most consecutive wins
Tonga women have not yet won two consecutive matches.

Most consecutive losses

Matches	First loss	Last loss	Days	Ended	Days
6	12 Oct 2003	14 Nov 2008	5 years, 34 days	7 Nov 2020	17 years, 54 days
4	25 Jun 2022	25 Oct 2025	3 years, 122 days	1 Nov 2025	3 years, 129 days

Note: Tonga went winless for 10 matches from 30 September 2003 to 14 November 2008 (5 years, 46 days), with the losing sequence split by a draw in the fourth of the ten matches, on 8 October 2003.

== See also ==
- Rugby league in Tonga
- Tongan National Rugby League
- Tonga national rugby league team
- Tonga National Rugby League
- History of the Tonga national rugby league team
