= Tamaku Paul =

NZ dual-code international rugby player

- Born: 10 May 1975 (age 51) Kawerau, New Zealand
- Height: 1.63 m (5 ft 4 in)
- Weight: 56 kg (8 st 11 lb)

Rugby union career
- Position: Wing
Amateur team(s)
Years	Team	Apps	(Points)
	Papamoa		(0)
Provincial / State sides
Years	Team	Apps	(Points)
1999–2002	Bay of Plenty	17	(90)
International career
Years	Team	Apps	(Points)
2001	New Zealand	1	(0)
National sevens team
Years	Team		Comps
2001	New Zealand 7s		
- Rugby league career

Playing information
Representative
Years	Team	Pld	T	G	FG	P
2002–03	New Zealand	6	9	0	0	36

Tamaku Paul (born 10 May 1975) is a former New Zealand dual-code international. She played for the Black Ferns and the Black Ferns sevens teams. She also competed for the Kiwi Ferns in the 2003 Rugby League World Cup.

== Rugby career ==
=== Rugby union ===
Paul was named in the Black Ferns squad to play England in two tests in June 2001. She made her international debut on 9 June 2001 against England at Rotorua. She played provincially for Bay of Plenty.

Paul was part of the Black Ferns sevens side that won the 2001 Hong Kong Sevens, she was named player of the tournament. She was also a provincial netball and touch representative.

=== Rugby league ===
Paul competed for the Kiwi Ferns at the NZWRL Oceania Tournament in 2002. She played for the Kiwi Ferns in the 2003 Rugby League World Cup in New Zealand. She scored nine tries in the tournament.
