= Tonga National Rugby League =

Former governing body for rugby league in Tonga

- Founded: 1949
- IRL affiliation: 1986 (Test nation)
- APRL affiliation: 2010 (full; founder)
- Responsibility: Tonga

(Tonga)
- As of 27 September 2019

The Tonga National Rugby League (TNRL) was the governing body for rugby league in Tonga. It is based in the capital Nuku'alofa.

The TNRL was founded in 1949 and has been a member of the Rugby League International Federation (RLIF) since 1974.

== Suspension and expulsion from IRL ==
In September 2019 membership of the RLIF was suspended after Semisi Sika, acting-prime minister of Tonga, wrote to the RLIF to advise that TNRL had lost the confidence of the government, the Tongan rugby league clubs and the country's players. In a statement the RLIF stressed that "the suspension of TNRL is not an expulsion and is intended to provide a period of stability, while the matters raised by the various stakeholders can be properly and fully investigated" although a new body Tonga Ma’a Tonga Rugby League has been set up by the Tongan Sports Council and the players which is expected to take over running of the national teams. The board of TNRL announced on 27 September 2019 that they would be taking legal action against the Tongan government and Tonga Ma’a Tonga Rugby League and appealing the suspension by the RLIF.

In December 2019 an International Rugby League (IRL) (Note: The RLIF renamed itself as IRL in late 2019) report proposed a number of changes to the governance of TNRL which TNR had 30 days to act upon. TNRL responded that the changes were "undemocratic" and "being forced upon them". The IRL board met on 13 February and announced on 17 February that the board had informed TNRL that it is expelled from membership of IRL. As a precedent concerning a Tongan Invitational XIII to play has already been set, it is not considered that the expulsion of TNRL will affect the participation of Tonga's national teams in any competition. On 31 March 2020, the International Rugby League started looking for new applicants to govern Tongan rugby league.

TNRL appealed to the Court of Arbitration for Sport but the appeal was dismissed in April 2021 leaving IRL to work with interested parties in Tonga to establish a new governing body.

In June 2024, International Rugby League recognised Tonga Rugby League XIII as the official governing body for rugby league in Tonga and granted them full membership of the organisation.

== See also ==
- Rugby league in Tonga
- Tonga national rugby league team
- Tonga women's national rugby league team
