= Rugby league nines at the 2019 Pacific Games =

- Venue: Apia Park
- Location: Apia, Samoa
- Dates: 8–9 July 2019
- Teams: 7 (men); 6 (women)

Rugby league nines at the 2019 Pacific Games was played from 8–9 July 2019 at Apia Park in Samoa. A women's rugby league tournament was introduced for the first time at the Pacific Games.

== Medal summary ==
=== Medal table ===
Rank	Nation	Gold	Silver	Bronze	Total
1	Fiji	2	0	0	2
2	Papua New Guinea	0	2	0	2
3	Cook Islands	0	0	1	1
3	Samoa*	0	0	1	1
Totals (4 entries)		2	2	2	6

=== Results ===
Event	Gold	Silver	Bronze	Ref
Men	Fiji; Vereti Bukavesi; Maikeli Dakuitoga; Anisito Komai; Penaia Leveleve; Kabati Matanakilagi; Luke Nadurutalo; Rupeni Naikawakawa; Maikeli Peters; Rusiate Ratu; Josua Roko; Eparama Rubuni; Penioni Tagituimua; Taniela Tamanivalu; Apakuki Tavodi; Wame Turaganivalu	Papua New Guinea; Maya Clarke; Sailas Gahuna; Jah Hogen; Rex Kaupa; Joel Kee; Eliakim Lukura; Moses Okapila; Mega Pali; Bill Paul; Solomon Pokare; John Ragi Jr. Abel Rami; John Stanley; Sani Wabo; Messech Wallen	Samoa; Arthur Brown; Tulolo Tulolo; Faafou Amate; Faafouina Loau; Tafeaga Silver; Jesse Matafeo; David Tavita-Faiai; Iosua Afoa; Paul Chang-Tung; Larry Sam Yung; Arnord Meredith; Luaao Toala; Tanielu Pasene; Faresa Timo-Perenise; Lolesio Niumata	
Women	Fiji; Wainikiti Deku; Alisi Komaitai; Luisa Kunadua; Ateca Leiyamo; Merewairita Nai; Losena Qiolevu; Roela Radiniyavuni; Ro Lice Ratumaitavuki; Sereima Rauqe; Timaima Ravisa; Jennifer Ravutia; Asena Rokomarama; Vilisi Vakaloloma; Limaina Wai; Senimelia Waqa	Papua New Guinea; Elsie Albert; Catherine Anjo; Heather Ario; Lynel Aua; Carol Francis; Shirley Joe; Janet Johns; Roswita Kapo; Joan Kuman; Lancy Laki; Lydia Luke; Ray Rambi; Winnie Steven; Joyce Waula; Vero Waula	Cook Islands	

== Men's tournament ==
=== Pool A ===
Team	Pld	W	D	L	PF	PA	+/−	Pts
Papua New Guinea	2	2	0	0	20	4	+16	4
Samoa	2	1	0	1	22	22	0	2
Fiji	2	1	1	2	18	22	-4	2
Tonga	2	0	0	2	8	20	-12	0

8 July 2019

Tonga	0 – 10	Papua New Guinea

Apia Park, Samoa

Fiji	14 – 12	Samoa

Apia Park, Samoa

Papua New Guinea	10 – 4	Fiji

Apia Park, Samoa

Samoa	10 – 8	Tonga

Apia Park, Samoa

=== Pool B ===
Team	Pld	W	D	L	PF	PA	+/−	Pts
Cook Islands	2	2	0	0	42	8	+36	4
Tokelau	2	1	0	1	12	26	-14	2
Solomon Islands	2	0	0	2	8	28	-20	0

8 July 2019

Cook Islands	22 – 4	Tokelau

Apia Park, Samoa

Cook Islands	20 – 4	Solomon Islands

Apia Park, Samoa

Tokelau	8 – 4	Solomon Islands

Apia Park, Samoa

=== Ranking games ===
8 July 2019

Tonga	8 – 4	Cook Islands

Apia Park, Samoa

Fiji	30 – 4	Tokelau

Apia Park, Samoa

Papua New Guinea	10 – 4	Samoa

Apia Park, Samoa

9 July 2019

Cook Islands	22 – 20	Tokelau

Apia Park, Samoa

Tokelau	18 – 24	Solomon Islands

Apia Park, Samoa

Solomon Islands	10 – 4	Cook Islands

Apia Park, Samoa

=== Finals ===
Semi-finals
Papua New Guinea	12
Tonga	0
Fiji	18
Samoa	8

Final
Papua New Guinea	0
Fiji	14
Third place
Tonga	12
Samoa	16

=== Rankings ===
Classification
1st place, gold medalist(s)	Fiji
2nd place, silver medalist(s)	Papua New Guinea
3rd place, bronze medalist(s)	Samoa
4	Tonga
5	Cook Islands
6	Tokelau
7	Solomon Islands

== Women's tournament ==
=== Pool A ===
Team	Pld	W	D	L	PF	PA	+/−	Pts
Cook Islands	2	2	0	0	54	12	+42	4
Samoa	2	1	0	1	50	20	+30	2
Solomon Islands	2	0	0	2	4	76	-72	0

8 July 2019

Cook Islands	16 – 12	Samoa

Apia Park, Samoa

Cook Islands	38 – 0	Solomon Islands

Apia Park, Samoa

Samoa	38 – 4	Solomon Islands

Apia Park, Samoa

=== Pool B ===
Team	Pld	W	D	L	PF	PA	+/−	Pts
Fiji	2	2	0	0	34	8	+26	4
Papua New Guinea	2	1	0	1	18	20	-2	2
Niue	2	0	0	2	4	28	-24	0

8 July 2019

Papua New Guinea	8 – 16	Fiji

Apia Park, Samoa

Niue	4 – 10	Papua New Guinea

Apia Park, Samoa

8 July 2019

Fiji	18 – 0	Niue

Apia Park, Samoa

=== Finals ===
Semi-finals
Papua New Guinea	14
Cook Islands	8
Fiji	12
Samoa	4

Final
Papua New Guinea	14
Fiji	16
Third place
Cook Islands	24
Samoa	10

=== Rankings ===
Classification
1st place, gold medalist(s)	Fiji
2nd place, silver medalist(s)	Papua New Guinea
3rd place, bronze medalist(s)	Cook Islands
4	Samoa
5	Niue
6	Solomon Islands

== See also ==
- Rugby league at the Pacific Games
