= Rugby league sevens at the 2009 Pacific Mini Games =

Rugby League at the 2009 Pacific Mini Games
- Venue: BCI Stadium
- Location: Rarotonga, Cook Islands
- Dates: 28–29 September 2009
- Teams: 4

Medalists
gold medal	Fiji
silver medal	Cook Islands
bronze medal	Samoa

Rugby league sevens at the 2009 Pacific Mini Games was held from 5–6 September 2009 at Marist St. Joseph's Stadium. Fiji won the gold medal, defeating hosts the Cook Islands in the final by 20–12. Samoa took the bronze medal, defeating Tonga by 26–24 in the third place match.

== Results ==
Team	Pld	W	D	L	PF	PA	+/−	Pts
Samoa	3	1	2	0	54	48	+6	7
Tonga	3	2	0	1	64	60	+4	7
Fiji	3	1	1	1	64	62	+2	6
Cook Islands	3	0	2	1	56	68	-12	4

=== Preliminary games ===
28 September 2009	Tonga	12 – 18	Samoa	BCI Stadium

28 September 2009	Cook Islands	18 – 24	Fiji	BCI Stadium

28 September 2009	Fiji	20 – 24	Tonga	BCI Stadium

28 September 2009	Samoa	16 – 16	Cook Islands	BCI Stadium

28 September 2009	Tonga	28 – 22	Cook Islands	BCI Stadium

28 September 2009	Fiji	20 – 20	Samoa	BCI Stadium

=== Semi Finals (1v4; 2v3) ===
29 September 2009	Cook Islands	16 – 6	Samoa	BCI Stadium

29 September 2009	Tonga	14 – 16	Fiji	BCI Stadium

=== Bronze-medal match ===
29 September 2009	Tonga	24 – 26	Samoa	BCI Stadium
14:55		Report

=== Gold-medal match ===
29 September 2009	Fiji	20 – 12	Cook Islands	BCI Stadium
13:30		Report

== Final standings ==
Place	Nation
Gold	Fiji
Silver	Cook Islands
Bronze	Samoa
4	Tonga
