= Papua New Guinea women's national rugby league team =

Papua New Guinea Orchids
Team information
- Nickname: PNG Orchids
- Governing body: Papua New Guinea Rugby Football League
- Region: Asia-Pacific
- Head coach: Craig Sandercock
- Captain: Elsie Albert
- Most caps: Gloria Kapua (14)
- Top try-scorer: Belinda Gwasamun (6)
- Top point-scorer: Emily Veivers (34)
- IRL ranking: 6 (20 August 2026)

Team results
- First game
- Papua New Guinea 4–42 Australia; Port Moresby, 23 Sep 2017
- First international
- Papua New Guinea 8–36 England; Woolooware, 16 Nov 2017
- Biggest win
- Papua New Guinea 70–0 Brazil; Hull, 5 Nov 2022
- Biggest defeat
- Papua New Guinea 0–84 Australia; Brisbane, 18 Oct 2024
- World Cup
- Appearances: 2 (first time in 2017)
- Best result: 2021 (Semi-Finalists)

The Papua New Guinea women's national rugby league team, also known as the PNG Orchids represents Papua New Guinea in Women's rugby league. They are administered by the Papua New Guinea Rugby Football League.

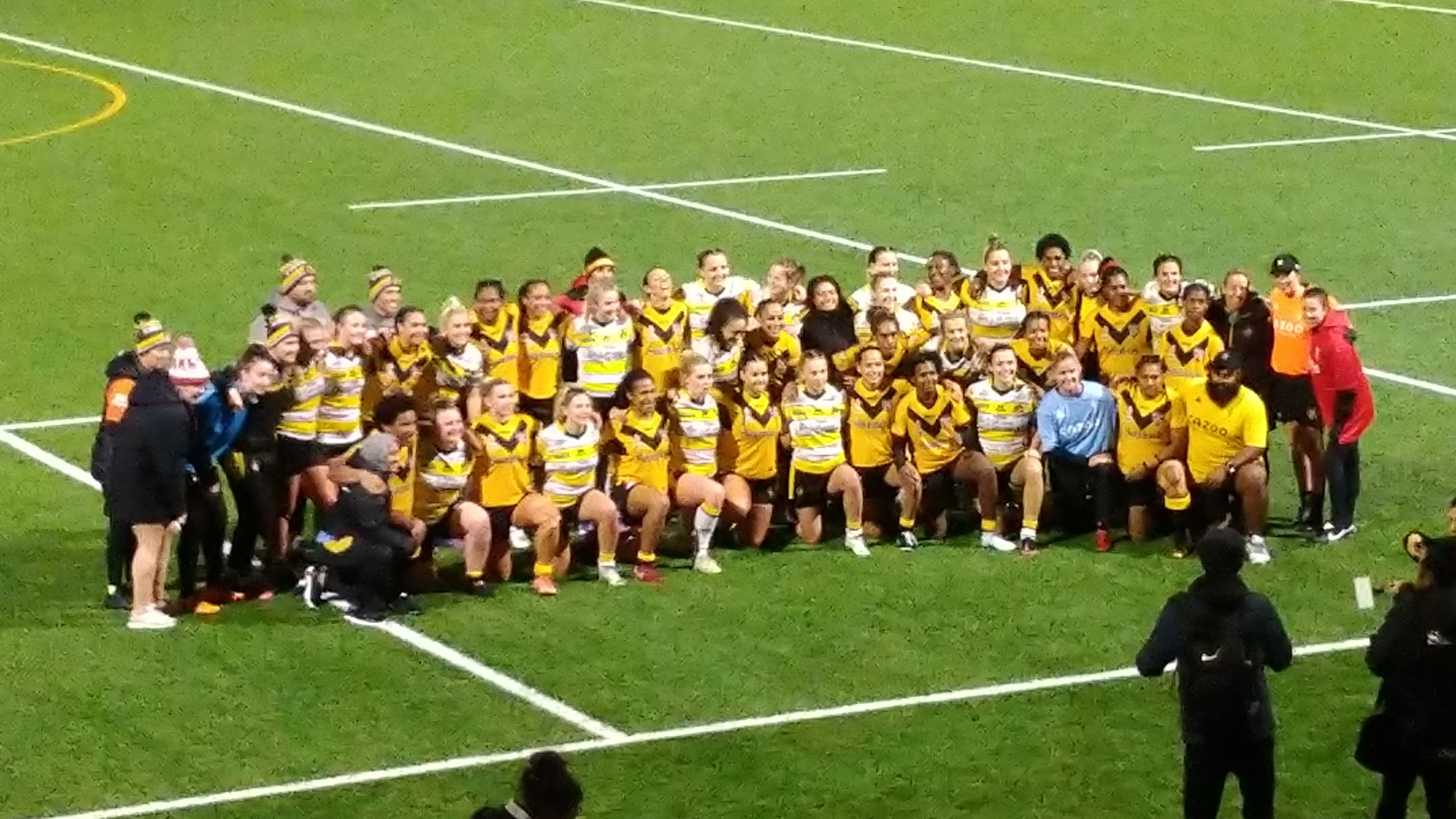
PNG Orchids and York Valkyrie (20 October 2022) - Elsie Albert and Lisa-Marie Alu each scored two tries as the Orchids won 38–0

== Head to head records ==
Opponent	FM	MR	M	W	D	L	Win%	PF	PA	Share
England	2017	2022	4	1	0	3	25.00%	42	118	26.25%
Canada	2017	2022	2	1	0	1	50.00%	42	34	55.26%
New Zealand	2017	2026	3	0	0	3	0.00%	12	114	9.52%
Fiji	2019	2026	2	0	0	2	0.00%	4	68	5.56%
Brazil	2022	2022	1	1	0	0	100.00%	70	0	100.00%
Australia	2022	2024	2	0	0	2	0.00%	0	166	0.00%
Cook Islands	2023	2025	2	1	0	1	50.00%	34	54	38.64%
Samoa	2024	2024	1	0	0	1	0.00%	12	34	26.09%
Tonga	2025	2025	1	0	0	1	0.00%	6	42	12.50%
France	2026	2026	1	1	0	0	100.00%	58	4	93.55%
Totals	2017	2026	19	5	0	14	26.32%	280	634	30.63%

Notes:

- Table last updated 31 October 2026 (after the match against New Zealand).
- Share is the portion of "For" points compared to the sum of "For" and "Against" points.

== Coaches ==
The current Orchids Coach is Craig Sandercock.

Name	Span	Tests					PM's XIII					Nines					Ref.
Name	Span	M	W	D	L	W%	M	W	D	L	W%	M	W	D	L	W%	Ref.
Dennis Miall	2017	3	0	0	0	0%	1	0	0	1	0%	N/A					
David Westley	2018	N/A					1	0	0	1	0%	N/A					
Nigel Hukula	2019	1	0	0	1	0%	N/A					N/A					
Bagel Solien	2019	2	1	0	1	50%	N/A					7	2	0	5	29%	
Ben Jeffries	2022-23	5	3	0	2	60%	2	0	0	2	0%	N/A					
Tahnee Norris	2024-25	5	0	0	5	0%	2	0	0	2	0%	N/A					
Craig Sandercock	2026	3	1	0	2	33%	0	0	0	0	0%	N/A					

Note

- Last updated 31 October 2026 (after the match against New Zealand)
- Cathy Neap coached the 2026 PNG Prime Minister's XIII women's team.

== Notable players ==
The following Papua New Guinea representatives have played in the NRL Women's Premiership

- Elsie Albert (Parramatta Eels 2020—present, 16 matches, 3 tries as at 17 August 2023)
- Therese Aiton (Parramatta Eels 2021 season, 2 matches)
- Amelia Kuk (Brisbane Broncos 2018, 2 matches)
- Ua Ravu (Canberra Raiders 2023—present)
- Shellie Long (North Queensland Cowboys 2023—present)
- Sera Koroi (North Queensland Cowboys 2023—present)
- Jessikah Reeves (North Queensland Cowboys 2023—present)
- Essay Banu (North Queensland Cowboys 2023—present)

== Current squad ==
Head coach: Craig Sandercock

The squad for the 2026 Rugby League World Cup was announced on 7 October 2026.

Jersey numbers in the table reflect selections for the Round 3 match versus New Zealand.

Table last updated 1 November 2026.

J#	Player	Age	Position(s)	Orchids						Club	NRLW						Other Reps
J#	Player	Age	Position(s)	Dbt	M	T	G	F	Pts	Club	CM	TM	T	G	F	Pts	Other Reps
1	Anika Butler	26	Fullback	2022	7	2	0	0	8	Pickers	0	0	0	0	0	0	1 2
18	Mala Mark	—	Wing	2017	4	0	0	0	0	Central Dabaris	0	0	0	0	0	0	5
3	Relna Wuruki-Hosea	21	Centre	2025	4	1	0	0	4	Raiders	6	6	2	0	0	8	1
4	Tia Molo	18	Centre	2025	5	3	0	0	12	Broncos	0	0	0	0	0	0	—
5	Naomi Kelly	—	Wing	2025	5	5	0	0	20	Central Dabaris	0	0	0	0	0	0	1
6	Fleur Ginn	20	Five-eighth	2025	5	2	0	0	8	Eels	15	15	3	0	0	12	1
16	Gemma Schnaubelt	29	Halfback	2019	4	0	0	0	0	Clydesdales	0	0	0	0	0	0	1
8	Elsie Albert	30	Prop	2019	15	4	0	0	16	Eels	31	46	11	0	0	44	3 2
14	Therese Aiton	37	Hooker	2019	10	1	0	0	4	Clydesdales	0	2	0	0	0	0	2 1 3
10	Jenny David	—	Prop	2026	3	0	0	0	0	Tigers	0	0	0	0	0	0	1
11	Emily Veivers	25	Second-row, Lock	2022	12	1	15	0	34	Cowboys	2	2	0	0	0	0	1 4
12	Shellie Long	26	Second-row	2022	7	3	0	0	12	Pride	0	11	1	0	0	4	1 2
13	India Seeto	20	Lock	2025	5	0	0	0	0	Tigers	0	0	0	0	0	0	1
19	Mya Muller	—	Prop	2025	2	0	0	0	0	Panthers	0	0	0	0	0	0	1
15	Essay Banu	24	Prop	2022	12	2	0	0	8	Cowboys	30	30	2	0	0	8	1 3 4
22	Jafinda Sap	—	Prop	2026	2	0	0	0	0	Central Dabaris	0	0	0	0	0	0	1
17	Venessa Nakas	—	Second-row	2026	2	0	0	0	0	Central Dabaris	0	0	0	0	0	0	—
9	Ua Ravu	29	Hooker	2019	11	3	0	0	12	Rabbitohs	0	2	0	0	0	0	1 3
2	Jasmine Joe	—	Wing	—	0	0	0	0	0	Port Moresby Vipers	0	0	0	0	0	0	—
20	Josephine Howard	—	Hooker, Prop	—	0	0	0	0	0	Central Dabaris	0	0	0	0	0	0	2
7	Cynthiah Peters	—	Halfback	2026	2	0	0	0	0	Rabaul Gurias	0	0	0	0	0	0	1
–	Ivania Wong	29	Wing	2026	2	1	0	0	4	— Brumbies	0	0	0	0	0	0	1
IJ	Belinda Gwasamun	—	Second-row	2019	14	6	0	0	24	Mt Hagen Eagles	0	0	0	0	0	0	1 4

Notes:

- The Other Reps columns include matches:
  - against the Australian Prime Minister's XIII
  - against Far North Queensland, Brisbane Broncos, and York Valkyrie.
  - for Queensland: Therese Aiton.
  - for the Indigenous All Stars: Essay Banu.

== Results ==
=== Full internationals ===
Date	Opponent	Score	Tournament	Venue	Video	Reports
16 Nov 2017	England	8–36	2017 World Cup	Southern Cross Group Stadium, Sydney		
19 Nov 2017	Canada	8–22	2017 World Cup	Southern Cross Group Stadium, Sydney		
22 Nov 2017	New Zealand	0–38	2017 World Cup	Southern Cross Group Stadium, Sydney		
22 Jun 2019	Fiji	0–28	Test Match	Leichhardt Oval, Sydney		
9 Nov 2019	England	10–24	2 Test Series	Goroka		
16 Nov 2019	England	20–16	2 Test Series	National Football Stadium, Port Moresby		
1 Nov 2022	Canada	34–12	2021 World Cup	Headingley Stadium, Leeds		
5 Nov 2022	Brazil	70–0	2021 World Cup	MKM Stadium, Hull		
9 Nov 2022	England	4–42	2021 World Cup	Headingley Stadium, Leeds		
14 Nov 2022	Australia	0–82	2021 World Cup	York Community Stadium, York		
22 Oct 2023	Cook Islands	28–20	Test Match	Santos Stadium, Port Moresby		
18 Oct 2024	Australia	0–84	2024 Pacific Championship	Suncorp Studium, Brisbane		
3 Nov 2024	New Zealand	0–36	2024 Pacific Championship	Santos Stadium, Port Moresby		
10 Nov 2024	Samoa	12–34	2024 Pacific Championship	Western Sydney Stadium, Sydney		
18 Oct 2025	Cook Islands	6–34	2025 Pacific Championship	Santos Stadium, Port Moresby		
1 Nov 2025	Tonga	6–42	2025 Pacific Championship	Santos Stadium, Port Moresby		
17 Oct 2026	France	58–4	2026 World Cup	Santos Stadium, Port Moresby		
24 Oct 2026	Fiji	4–40	2026 World Cup	Santos Stadium, Port Moresby		
31 Oct 2026	New Zealand	12–40	2026 World Cup	Cbus Super Stadium, Gold Coast		

=== Tour / trial / warm-up matches ===
Date	Opponent	Score	Tournament	Venue	Video	Report
20 Oct 2017	Far North Queensland	30–6	Warm-Up Match	Billy Slater Oval, Callendar Park, Innisfail		—
2 Sep 2018	Brisbane Broncos	14–48	Trial Match	Suncorp Stadium, Brisbane		
31 Aug 2019	Brisbane Broncos	0–14	Trial Match	National Football Stadium, Port Moresby		
20 Oct 2022	York Valkyrie	38–0	Warm-Up Match	(England) York St John University Sports Park, York	—	
15 Jun 2025	Australian Defence Force	48–6	Tour Match	National Football Stadium, Port Moresby		
22 Jun 2025	Brisbane Broncos	0–48	Trial Match	Suncorp Stadium, Brisbane	—	

=== Nines ===
Date	Opponent	Score	Tournament	Venue	Video	Reports
8 Jul 2019	Fiji	8–16	2019 Pacific Games	Apia Park	—	
8 Jul 2019	Niue	10–4	2019 Pacific Games	Apia Park	—	—
9 Jul 2019	Cook Islands	14–8	2019 Pacific Games	Apia Park		—
9 Jul 2019	Fiji	14–16	2019 Pacific Games	Apia Park		
18 Oct 2019	England	4–25	2019 International Nines	Bankwest Stadium, Parramatta	—	
19 Oct 2019	New Zealand	12–24	2019 International Nines	Bankwest Stadium, Parramatta	—	
19 Oct 2019	Australia	6–30	2019 International Nines	Bankwest Stadium, Parramatta	—	—

== Upcoming fixtures ==
As of 1 November 2026, the next fixture for the Orchids has not yet been announced.

== Records ==
=== Margins and streaks ===
Biggest winning margins

Margin	Score	Opponent	Venue	Date
70	70–0	Brazil	MKM Stadium	5 Nov 2022
54	58–4	France	Santos National Football Stadium	17 Oct 2026
22	34–12	Canada	Headingley Stadium	1 Nov 2022
8	28–20	Cook Islands	Santos National Football Stadium	22 Oct 2023
4	20–16	England	Oil Search National Football Stadium	16 Nov 2019

Biggest losing margins

Margin	Score	Opponent	Venue	Date
84	0–84	Australia	Suncorp Stadium	18 Oct 2024
82	0–82	Australia	LNER Community Stadium	14 Nov 2022
38	4–42	England	Headingley Stadium	9 Nov 2022
38	0–38	New Zealand	Southern Cross Group Stadium	22 Nov 2017
36	0–36	New Zealand	Santos National Football Stadium	3 Nov 2024
36	6–42	Tonga	Santos National Football Stadium	1 Nov 2025
36	4–40	Fiji	Santos National Football Stadium	24 Oct 2026
28	8–36	England	Southern Cross Group Stadium	16 Nov 2017
28	6–34	Cook Islands	Santos National Football Stadium	18 Oct 2025
28	0–28	Fiji	Leichhardt Oval	22 Jun 2019
28	12–40	New Zealand	Cbus Super Stadium	31 Oct 2026
22	12–34	Samoa	CommBank Stadium	10 Nov 2024
14	10–24	England	Goroka	9 Nov 2019
14	8–22	Canada	Southern Cross Group Stadium	19 Nov 2017

Most consecutive wins

Matches	First win	Last win	Days	Ended	Days
3	16 Nov 2019	5 Nov 2022	2 years, 355 days	9 Nov 2022	2 years, 359 days

Most consecutive losses

Matches	First loss	Last loss	Days	Ended	Days
5	16 Nov 2017	9 Nov 2019	1 year, 358 days	16 Nov 2019	1 years, 365 days
5	18 Oct 2024	1 Nov 2025	1 year, 14 days	Current	2 years, 13 days

== See also ==
- Papua New Guinea national rugby league team
- Rugby league in Papua New Guinea
- Papua New Guinea Rugby Football League
