= Niue women's national rugby league team =

Women's sports organization

Team results
- First international
- Niue 0 — 44 Māori; North Harbour Stadium, Albany, NZ; 30 September 2003
- Biggest win
- Niue 22 — 14 Tokelau; North Harbour Stadium, Albany, NZ; 6 October 2003
- Biggest defeat
- Niue 0 — 58 Australia; North Harbour Stadium, Albany, NZ

Niue's women's national rugby league team are a rugby league team that represent Niue at international level. The team played in the 2003 Women's Rugby League World Cup in New Zealand. In 2020 they played their first full international since 2003, losing 66-8 to Tonga.

== Results ==
=== Full Internationals ===
Date	Opponent	Score	Tournament	Venue	Ref.
30 Sep 2003	(Māori people) Māori	0–44	2003 WRLWC	North Harbour Stadium	DT
2 Oct 2003	Australia	0–58	2003 WRLWC	North Harbour Stadium	RLW
6 Oct 2003	Tokelau	22–14	2003 WRLWC	North Harbour Stadium	RLR
8 Oct 2003	Tonga	14–14	2003 WRLWC	North Harbour Stadium	DT
10 Oct 2003	Samoa	18–24	2003 WRLWC	North Harbour Stadium	
7 Nov 2020	Tonga	8–66	Test Match	Mount Smart Stadium, Auckland	VR NZRL

=== Nines ===
Date	Opponent	Score	Tournament	Venue	Ref.
8 Jul 2019	Papua New Guinea	4–10	2019 Pacific Games	Apia Park	APRL
8 Jul 2019	Fiji	0–18	2019 Pacific Games	Apia Park	
