= Rugby league nines at the 2007 South Pacific Games =

Rugby league nines at the 2007 Pacific Games
- Venue: Marist St. Joseph's Stadium
- Location: Apia, Samoa
- Dates: 5–6 September 2007
- Teams: 6

Medalists
gold medal	Fiji
silver medal	Cook Islands
bronze medal	Samoa

Rugby league nines at the 2007 Pacific Games was held from 5–6 September 2007 at Marist St. Joseph's Stadium. Fiji won the gold medal, defeating the Cook Islands in the final by 14–0. Hosts Samoa took the bronze medal, defeating Tonga by 20–10 in the third place match.

== Results ==
=== Pool A ===
Team	Pld	W	D	L	PF	PA	+/−	Pts
Cook Islands	2	2	0	0	26	4	+22	4
Tonga	2	1	0	1	28	16	+12	2
Tokelau	2	0	0	2	6	40	-34	0

5 September 2007	Tonga	4–10	Cook Islands	Marist St. Joseph's Stadium
14:00		Report

5 September 2007	Tokelau	6–24	Tonga	Marist St. Joseph's Stadium
15:00		Report

5 September 2007	Cook Islands	16–0	Tokelau	Marist St. Joseph's Stadium
16:00		Report

=== Pool B ===
Team	Pld	W	D	L	PF	PA	+/−	Pts
Fiji	2	2	0	0	42	24	+18	4
Samoa	2	1	0	1	32	18	+14	2
Niue	2	0	0	2	18	50	-32	0

5 September 2007	Fiji	14–10	Samoa	Marist St. Joseph's Stadium
14:30		Report

5 September 2007	Niue	14–28	Fiji	Marist St. Joseph's Stadium
15:30		Report

5 September 2007	Samoa	22–4	Niue	Marist St. Joseph's Stadium
16:30		Report

=== 5th place play off ===
6 September 2007	Niue	10–16	Tokelau	Marist St. Joseph's Stadium
15:30		Report

=== Semi-finals ===
Semi-finals
Cook Islands	6
Samoa	0
Tonga	6
Fiji	12

Final
Fiji	14
Cook Islands	0
Third place
Samoa	20
Tonga	10

6 September 2007	Cook Islands	6–0	Samoa	Marist St. Joseph's Stadium
14:30		Report

6 September 2007	Tonga	6–12	Fiji	Marist St. Joseph's Stadium
15:00		Report

6 September 2007	Samoa	6–12	Tonga	Marist St. Joseph's Stadium
16:10		Report

6 September 2007	Cook Islands	0–14	Fiji	Marist St. Joseph's Stadium
16:40		Report

== Final standings ==
Place	Nation
Gold	Fiji
Silver	Cook Islands
Bronze	Samoa
4	Tonga
5	Tokelau
6	Niue
