= Cook Islands women's national rugby league team =

Cook Islands
Team information
- Nickname: The Moana
- Governing body: Cook Islands Rugby League Association
- Region: Asia-Pacific
- Head coach: Ronald Griffiths
- Home stadium: Avarua National Stadium
- IRL ranking: 11 ▼2 (20 August 2026)

Uniforms
First colours

Team results
- First international
- Cook Islands 0-68 New Zealand (North Harbour Stadium, Albany, New Zealand); 28 September 2003
- Biggest win
- Cook Islands 34-6 Papua New Guinea (PNG Football Stadium, Port Moresby); 18 October 2023
- Biggest defeat
- Cook Islands 0–76 New Zealand (Southern Cross Group Stadium, Sydney); 19 November 2017
- World Cup
- Appearances: 2 (first time in 2003)
- Best result: Round Robin,2017

The Cook Islands women's national rugby league team, also known as the Cook Islands Moana represents Cook Islands in Women's rugby league. The Cook Islands have competed in three Women's Rugby League World Cup tournaments.

In 2003, the Cook Islands played six matches, for two wins (both over Tokelau), a draw (with Great Britain), and three losses. In 2017 the Cook Islands lost their first two matches by large margins, before registering a surprise win over England in their third and last match. The Cook Islands participated in the 2021 Women's Rugby League World Cup which, after a delay due to the Covid-19 pandemic, was played in November 2022. Again, the Cook Islands lost their first two matches before winning their third and last match, on this occasion beating France women's national rugby league team.

The Cook Islands had prequalified for the 2025 Rugby League World Cup. The withdrawal of intended hosts France, in August 2023, prompted a review by the governing body, which resulted in a reduction in the number of teams, from sixteen to eight. The number of pre-qualified teams was also reduced from eight to four, impacting the Cook Islands. Consequently, the Cook Islands will now need to qualify for the next World Cup, which was pushed back to 2026.

== History ==
Cook Islands women's teams participated in the mid 1990s Oceania Cup tournaments in New Zealand. After appearing in the 1996 Oceania Cup, there was a gap in participation by Moana teams for several years until a revival in 2002 ahead of the 2003 World Cup. Invitational games were played against Maori and Niue teams. The squad for 2003 tournament were selected from New Zealand clubs.

Cook Islands first World Cup appearance was at the 2003 Women's Rugby League World Cup. After a loss by a large margin in their opening fixture against New Zealand, Cook Islands won their second game against Tokelau. Fresh off byes in the last round of the first phase, and first round of the second phase, the Cook Islands held Great Britain to a 20-all draw.

Cook Islands qualified for the 2017 Women's Rugby League World Cup by default after Fiji, Samoa and Tonga withdrew from the Pacific qualifying tournament due to a lack of players. After losses by large margins to New Zealand and Australia, the Cook Islands team had an upset victory over England.

== Head to head records ==
Opponent	FM	MR	M	W	D	L	Win%	PF	PA	Share
New Zealand	2003	2022	3	0	0	3	0.00%	4	178	2.20%
Tokelau	2003	2003	2	2	0	0	100.00%	48	28	63.16%
Great Britain	2003	2003	1	0	1	0	50.00%	20	20	50.00%
(Māori people) Māori	2003	2003	1	0	0	1	0.00%	0	46	0.00%
Samoa	2003	2003	1	0	0	1	0.00%	18	28	39.13%
Australia	2017	2022	2	0	0	2	0.00%	4	132	2.94%
England	2017	2017	1	1	0	0	100.00%	22	16	57.89%
France	2022	2022	1	1	0	0	100.00%	26	18	59.09%
Papua New Guinea	2023	2025	2	1	0	1	50.00%	54	34	61.36%
Fiji	2024	2024	1	0	0	1	0.00%	6	18	25.00%
Tonga	2025	2026	2	1	0	1	50.00%	66	60	52.38%
Totals	2003	2026	17	6	1	10	38.24%	268	578	31.68%

Note:

- Table last updated 12 October 2025.
- Share is the portion of "For" points compared to the sum of "For" and "Against" points.

== Coaches ==
Full internationals

As of 13 October 2026

Coach	Season span	M	W	D	L	For	Agst	Win %	Share %	Ref
Tom Bishop	2003	6	2	1	3	86	190	41.67%	31.16%	
Ian Bourke	2017	3	1	0	2	26	150	33.33%	14.77%	
Rusty Matua	2022–2024	5	1	0	4	56	172	20.00%	24.56%	
Ronald Griffiths	2025	2	2	0	0	76	30	100.00%	71.70%	
Sharlene Atai	2026	1	0	0	1	24	36	00.00%	40.00%	

Notes:

- Sharlene Atai (nee Johnston) played for the Kiwi Ferns from 2000 to 2017.

== Current squad ==
The Moana squad for the 10 October 2026 match against Tonga was announced on social media on 6 October 2026.

Jersey numbers and tallies in the table reflect that 2026 match.

J#	Player	Age	Position(s)	Moana						Club	NRLW						Other Reps
J#	Player	Age	Position(s)	Dbt	M	T	G	F	Pts	Club	CM	TM	T	G	F	Pts	Other Reps
20	Kiana Takairangi	34	Wing, Centre	2017	9	1	0	0	4	Eels	2	15	9	0	0	36	2 1 3
19	Tiare-Anne Leauga	18	Wing	2026	1	0	0	0	0	Bulldogs	0	0	0	0	0	0	—
3	Anastasia Sekene	28	Centre, Wing	2026	1	2	0	0	8	Warriors	0	2	0	0	0	0	—
4	Tyler Birch	30	Five-eighth	2024	2	0	1	0	2	Magpies	0	2	0	0	0	0	1
5	Ava Glassie	19	Wing, Fullback	2026	1	2	0	0	8	Knights	0	0	0	0	0	0	—
6	Lydia Turua-Quedley	27	Five-eighth, Hooker	2017	8	0	0	0	0	Cowboys	8	19	0	0	0	0	—
7	Memory Paitai	19	Five-eighth	2025	2	1	0	0	4	Bears	0	0	0	0	0	0	—
8	Porche John	19	Prop	2025	2	0	0	0	0	Tigers	0	0	0	0	0	0	—
1	Pearl Tuitama	—	Hooker, Lock	2025	3	0	0	0	0	Jets	0	0	0	0	0	0	—
17	Ashley Marsters	32	Prop, Lock	2026	1	0	0	0	0	Cowboys	9	9	3	0	0	12	—
11	Keira Rangi	19	Second-row	2025	2	0	0	0	0	Titans	0	0	0	0	0	0	—
12	Maeva Atatoa Carr	—	Second-row	2026	1	0	0	0	0	Rovers	0	0	0	0	0	0	—
13	Roimata Amosa-Tiro	—	Lock, Hooker	2026	1	0	0	0	0	Devils	0	0	0	0	0	0	—
14	Maruia Willie	—	Hooker	2026	1	1	0	0	4	Rovers	0	0	0	0	0	0	—
15	April Ngatupuna	23	Prop, Lock	2022	6	1	0	0	4	Magpies	0	11	1	0	0	4	—
18	Kerehitina Matua	27	Second-row, Prop	2022	8	4	4	0	24	—	0	20	2	0	0	8	4
2	Jodeci Joseph	—	Hooker	2023	4	0	0	0	0	Marlins	0	0	0	0	0	0	—
21	Akeliana-Faith Leauga	—	Five-eighth	—	0	0	0	0	0	Hawks	0	0	0	0	0	0	—
–	Matoisha Kalepo	19	Second-row	—	0	0	0	0	0	Bulldogs	0	0	0	0	0	0	—
–	Paulina Morris-Ponga	29	Fullback	2023	4	4	0	0	16	Rovers	0	0	0	0	0	0	—

Notes

- The shading in the Clubs column of the above table indicates players selected from teams outside the 2026 NRLW.
  - QRL BMD WP
    - Brisbane Tigers (1): Porche John
    - Burleigh Bears (1): Memory Paitai
    - Ipswich Jets (1): Pearl Tuitama
    - Norths Devils (1): Roimata Amosa-Tiro
    - Souths Logan Magpies (2): April Ngatupuna, Tyler Birch
  - NSW HNWP
    - Canterbury Bulldogs (2): Matoisha Kalepo, Tiare-Anne Leauga
    - Newcastle Knights (1): Ava Glassie
  - Auckland Rugby League
    - Mangere East Hawks (1): Akeliana-Faith Leauga
    - Manurewa Marlins (1): Jodeci Joseph
    - Richmond Rovers (3): Maeva Atatoa Carr, Maruia Willie, Paulina Morris-Ponga (Ponga-Pierre)

== Results ==
=== Full internationals ===
Date	Opponent	Score	Tournament	Venue	Video	Report(s)
28 Sep 2003	New Zealand	0–68	2003 World Cup	North Harbour Stadium	—	
30 Sep 2003	Tokelau	30–16	2003 World Cup	North Harbour Stadium	—	
6 Oct 2003	Great Britain	20–20	2003 World Cup	North Harbour Stadium	—	
8 Oct 2003	(Māori people) Māori	0–46	2003 World Cup	North Harbour Stadium	—	
10 Oct 2003	Tokelau	18–12	2003 World Cup	North Harbour Stadium	—	
12 Oct 2003	Samoa	18–28	2003 World Cup	North Harbour Stadium	—	
16 Nov 2017	Australia	4–58	2017 World Cup	Southern Cross Group Stadium, Sydney		
19 Nov 2017	New Zealand	0–76	2017 World Cup	Southern Cross Group Stadium, Sydney		
22 Nov 2017	England	22–16	2017 World Cup	Southern Cross Group Stadium, Sydney		
2 Nov 2022	Australia	0–74	2021 World Cup	York Community Stadium, York		
6 Nov 2022	New Zealand	4–34	2021 World Cup	York Community Stadium, York		
10 Nov 2022	France	26–18	2021 World Cup	York Community Stadium, York		
22 Oct 2023	Papua New Guinea	20–28	2023 Pacific Championship	Santos Stadium, Port Moresby		
26 Oct 2024	Fiji	6–18	2024 Pacific Championship	HFC Bank Stadium, Suva		
18 Oct 2025	Papua New Guinea	34–6	2025 Pacific Championship	Santos Stadium, Port Moresby		
25 Oct 2025	Tonga	42–24	2025 Pacific Championship	Santos Stadium, Port Moresby		
10 Oct 2026	Tonga	24–36	Test Match	St Mary's Leagues Stadium, Sydney		

=== Other matches ===
Date	Opponent	Score	Tournament	Venue	Video	Report(s)
27 Oct 2022	England Knights	26–14	Warm-Up Trial Match	Weetwood, Leeds	—	

=== Nines ===
Date	Opponent	Score	Tournament	Venue	Video	Report(s)
23 Feb 2018	Tonga	4–12	2018 Commonwealth Championship	Dolphin Stadium, Brisbane	—	
23 Feb 2018	Canada	20–12	2018 Commonwealth Championship	Dolphin Stadium, Brisbane		
24 Feb 2018	Australia	8–14	2018 Commonwealth Championship	Dolphin Stadium, Brisbane	—	
24 Feb 2018	Tonga	20–0	2018 Commonwealth Championship	Dolphin Stadium, Brisbane	—	
8 Jul 2019	Samoa	16–12	2019 Pacific Games	Apia Park	—	
8 Jul 2019	Solomon Islands	38–0	2019 Pacific Games	Apia Park	—	
9 Jul 2019	Papua New Guinea	8–14	2019 Pacific Games	Apia Park	—	
9 Jul 2019	Samoa	24–10	2019 Pacific Games	Apia Park		
20 Nov 2023	Solomon Islands	36–0	2023 Pacific Games	National Stadium, Honiara	—	
20 Nov 2023	Vanuatu	28–6	2023 Pacific Games	National Stadium, Honiara	—	
20 Nov 2023	Samoa	20–4	2023 Pacific Games	National Stadium, Honiara	—	
21 Nov 2023	Fiji	18–10	2023 Pacific Games	National Stadium, Honiara	—	
21 Nov 2023	Tonga	10–12	2023 Pacific Games	National Stadium, Honiara	—	
22 Nov 2023	Tonga	16–8	2023 Pacific Games	National Stadium, Honiara	—	

== Upcoming fixtures ==
As of 12 October 2026, the next match for Cook Islands Moana is yet to be scheduled.

== Records ==
=== Margins and streaks ===
Biggest winning margins

Margin	Score	Opponent	Venue	Date
28	34–6	Papua New Guinea	Santos National Football Stadium	18 Oct 2025
18	42–24	Tonga	Santos National Football Stadium	25 Oct 2025
14	30–16	Tokelau	North Harbour Stadium	30 Sep 2003
8	26–18	France	LNER Community Stadium	10 Nov 2022

Biggest losing margins

Margin	Score	Opponent	Venue	Date
76	0–76	New Zealand	Southern Cross Group Stadium	19 Nov 2017
74	0–74	Australia	LNER Community Stadium	2 Nov 2022
68	0–68	New Zealand	North Harbour Stadium	28 Sep 2003
54	4–58	Australia	Southern Cross Group Stadium	16 Nov 2017
30	4–34	New Zealand	LNER Community Stadium	6 Nov 2022

Most consecutive wins

Matches	First win	Last win	Days	Ended	Days
2	18 Oct 2025	25 Oct 2025	7 days	Current	1 year, 28 days

Most consecutive losses

Matches	First loss	Last loss	Days	Ended	Days
3	12 Oct 2003	19 Nov 2017	14 years, 39 days	22 Nov 2017	14 years, 42 days

== Past squads ==
=== 2017 ===
Squad for the 2017 Women's Rugby League World Cup:

- Toka Natua (Tokoroa, NZ)
- Te Kura Ngata-Aerengamate (Counties-Manukau, NZ)
- Te Amohaere Ngat-Aerengamate (Counties-Manukau, NZ)
- Crystal George Tamarua (Auckland, NZ)
- Danielle Apaiana (Auckland, NZ)
- Stephanie Wilson (Sydney, Australia)
- Eliza Wilson (Auckland, NZ)
- Josina Singapu (Gold Coast, Australia)
- Karol Tanevesi (Sydney, Australia)
- Samaria Taia (Sydney, Australia)
- Natalee Tagavaitau (Auckland, NZ)
- Kaylen Ikitule (Auckland, NZ)
- Kiana Takairangi (Sydney, Australia)
- Chantelle Inangaro Schofield (Cook Islands)
- Beniamina Koiatu (Auckland, NZ)
- Inangaro Maraeara (Sydney, Australia)
- Manea Poa-Maoate (Wellington, NZ)
- Lydia Turua-Quedley (Melbourne, Australia)
- Ruahei Demant (Auckland, NZ)
- Cecelia Strickland (Perth, Australia)
- Urshla Kere (Brisbane, Australia)
- Kiritapu Demant (Auckland, NZ)
- Katelyn Arona (Christchurch, NZ)

=== 2003 ===
Squad for the 2003 Women's Rugby League World Cup:

- Charmaine Angareu (Mangere East)
- Deborah Apaina (Ponsonby)
- Marry-Anne Aukino (Papakura)
- Rangi Aukino (Randwick)
- Justine Cook (Ponsonby)
- Sarah Cook (Ponsonby)
- Debbie Dorman (Ponsonby)
- Michelle Driscoll (Richmond)
- Tracey Larkin (Ponsonby)
- Elizabeth Mani (Mt Wellington)
- Caroline Marsters (Mt Wellington)
- Kelly Marsters (Te Atatu)
- Joyce Otikore-Joseph (Otara)
- Nora Pange (Mangere East)
- Api Parai (Te Atatu)
- Hilda Peters (Papakura)
- Karen Thorn (Ponsonby)
- Amiria Tikinau (Otahuhu)
- Mary Tuarae (Richmond)
- Tutai-Stephanie Utanga (Mt Wellington)
- Theresa Vaiula (Ponsonby)
- Teremoana Vano (Ponsonby)
- Teresa Wilson (Hillcrest)
- Tupou Wilson (Hillcrest)

== See also ==
- Cook Islands national rugby league team
- Rugby league in the Cook Islands
- Cook Islands Rugby League Association
- Cook Islands national rugby league team results
