= New Zealand Māori women's rugby league team =

National rugby team

New Zealand Māori
Team information
- Governing body: New Zealand Māori Rugby League
- Head coach: John Strange
- Captain: Kennedy Cherrington

Team results
- First international
- Māori 4–34 Great Britain (Auckland, New Zealand; 1998)
- Biggest win
- Māori 44–0 Niue (North Harbour Stadium, Albany; 2003)
- Biggest defeat
- Māori 0–58 New Zealand (North Harbour Stadium, Albany; 2003)
- World Cup
- Appearances: 1 (first time in 2003)
- Best result: Runners-Up

New Zealand Māori women’s rugby league team, also known as Wahine Toa, is a rugby league representative side made up of New Zealand Māori players. The side represents the New Zealand Māori Rugby league. The team has competed in international competition, including Test Matches and the 2003 World Cup. Since 2018 the team has competed in an annual All Stars match, against the Australian Indigenous women’s rugby league team.

== Coaches ==
Missing matches are 2002, 2006, and 2009.

Name	Span	M	W	D	L	W%	Ref.
Barry Ngawati	1998	1	0	0	0	0.00%	
Greg Brown	2003	7	4	0	0	57.14%	
Janie Thompson	2007	2	1	0	1	50.00%	
Victor Heke	2017	1	0	0	1	0.00%	
Rusty Matua	2019-2020	2	1	0	1	50.00%	
Keith Hanley	2021-2025	5	2	0	3	40.00%	
John Strange	2026	1	0	0	1	0.00%	

== Captains ==
Missing matches are 2002, 2006, 2007, 2009, and 2017.

Year	Captain(s)	Ref
1998	Mere Ngawati	
2003	Kellie Kiwi	
2019	Krystal Rota and Rona Peters	
2020	Krystal Rota and Raecene McGregor	
2021	Corban Baxter	
2022	Corban Baxter	
2023	Zahara Temara and Shannon Mato	
2024	Zahara Temara and Shannon Mato	
2025	Shannon Mato and Kennedy Cherrington	
2026	Zahara Temara and Kennedy Cherrington	

== Current squad ==
The following players were selected to play in the 15 February 2026 match against the Indigenous All Stars.
All twenty players spent time on the field during the game.
Players' ages are as at the date that the table was last updated, 16 February 2026.

J#	Player	Age	Position(s)	Māori All Stars						NRLW							Other Reps
J#	Player	Age	Position(s)	Dbt	M	T	G	F	Pts	2025 Club	CM	TM	T	G	F	Pts	Other Reps
1	Gayle Broughton	29	Five-eighth, Fullback	2023	2	0	0	0	0	Warriors	0	36	9	0	0	36	3
2	Payton Takimoana	22	Centre, Wing	2026	1	0	0	0	0	Warriors	11	11	15	0	0	60	—
3	Corban Baxter	31	Fullback, Five-eighth	2016	5	0	0	0	0	Roosters	31	31	10	0	0	40	10
4	Shanice Parker	27	Centre, Fullback	2016	5	2	0	0	8	Knights	41	46	11	0	0	44	8 1 1 2
5	Tenika Willison	28	Centre, Wing	2026	1	2	0	0	8	Knights	19	19	6	0	0	24	—
6	Zahara Temara	28	Halfback, Five-eighth	2017	6	0	3	0	6	Raiders	28	52	7	110	3	251	5 8 1
7	Raecene McGregor	28	Halfback	2020	6	2	3	0	14	Tigers	0	48	2	45	0	98	16
8	Rima Butler	28	Prop	2024	3	1	0	0	4	Roosters	13	33	8	0	0	32	2
9	Chanté Temara	24	Hooker	2024	3	1	0	0	4	Raiders	29	32	1	0	0	4	1
10	Mya Hill-Moana	23	Prop	2021	5	0	0	0	0	Warriors	0	25	1	0	0	4	10
11	Jasmin Strange	23	Second-row, Centre	2023	4	2	0	0	8	Roosters	25	36	10	0	0	40	2
12	Shakira Baker	34	Second-row, Centre	2026	1	0	0	0	0	Warriors	8	8	1	0	0	4	—
13	Kennedy Cherrington	27	Lock, Prop	2021	5	0	0	0	0	Eels	29	33	5	0	0	20	6 6 2 1
14	Rueben Cherrington	22	Hooker, Lock	2025	2	0	0	0	0	Eels	23	23	5	0	0	20	1 1
15	Matekino Gray	20	Prop, Second-row	2026	1	0	0	0	0	Warriors	8	12	0	0	0	0	—
16	Ashleigh Quinlan	31	Five-eighth, Halfback	2023	4	0	0	0	0	Bulldogs	10	33	7	0	0	28	5 1
17	Harata Butler	32	Prop	2020	4	0	0	0	0	Warriors	11	23	0	0	0	0	1 1
18	Fane Finau	19	Second-row	2026	1	0	0	0	0	Knights	4	4	2	0	0	8	—
19	Zali Fay	25	Wing	2021	5	2	0	0	8	Eels	33	33	6	0	0	24	1
20	Laikha Clarke	24	Prop	2023	3	1	0	0	4	Titans	29	29	3	0	0	12	2 1

== Results ==
Date	Opponent	Score	Tournament	Venue	Video	Ref.
16 August 1998	Great Britain	4–34	Tour Match	Waitakere Stadium, Auckland	—	
Oct 2002	New Zealand	10–36	Test Match	New Zealand	—	
8 August 2003	Australia	14–20	Test Match	Suncorp Stadium, Brisbane	—	
28 September 2003	Australia	24–28	2003 WRLWC	North Harbour Stadium	—	
30 September 2003	Niue	44–0	2003 WRLWC	North Harbour Stadium	—	
4 October 2003	Great Britain	10–8	2003 WRLWC	North Harbour Stadium	—	
8 October 2003	Cook Islands	46–0	2003 WRLWC	North Harbour Stadium	—	
10 October 2003	Australia	12–4	2003 WRLWC	North Harbour Stadium	—	
12 October 2003	New Zealand	0–58	2003 WRLWC	North Harbour Stadium	—	
1 July 2006	New Zealand	12–50	Test Match	Rotorua International Stadium	—	
31 October 2007	Australia	16–20	2 Test Series	Rotorua International Stadium	—	
3 November 2007	Australia	20–4	2 Test Series	Rotorua International Stadium	—	
16 September 2009	Australia	18–14	Test Match	New Zealand	—	
4 November 2017	New Zealand	12–32	Warm-up Match	Waikato Stadium, Hamilton	—	
15 February 2019	Indigenous All Stars	8–4	All Stars Match	AAMI Park		
22 February 2020	Indigenous All Stars	4–10	All Stars Match	Cbus Super Stadium		
20 February 2021	Indigenous All Stars	24–0	All Stars Match	Queensland Country Bank Stadium		
12 February 2022	Indigenous All Stars	8–18	All Stars Match	CommBank Stadium		
11 February 2023	Indigenous All Stars	16–12	All Stars Match	Rotorua International Stadium		
16 February 2024	Indigenous All Stars	4–26	All Stars Match	Queensland Country Bank Stadium		
15 February 2025	Indigenous All Stars	18–20	All Stars Match	CommBank Stadium		
15 February 2026	Indigenous All Stars	14–20	All Stars Match	Waikato Stadium		

== See also ==
- New Zealand women's national rugby league team
- New Zealand Māori rugby league team
- Māori All Blacks
