= 2003 Women's Rugby League World Cup =

Second staging of the Women's Rugby League World Cup

2003 Women's World Cup
- Number of teams: 9
- Host country: New Zealand
- Winner: New Zealand (2nd title)
- Runner-up: Maori
- Matches played: 25
- Points scored: 1146 (45.84 per match)
- Tries scored: 239 (9.56 per match)
- Top scorer: (New Zealand) Trish Hina 82 (T:9 G:23)
- Top try scorers: (New Zealand) Honey Hireme 10 (New Zealand) Fuarosa Time 10

The 2003 Women's Rugby League World Cup was the second staging of the Women's Rugby League World Cup. The tournament was held in Auckland, New Zealand from 28 September, culminating in the final between New Zealand and New Zealand Maori on 12 October. It was held at North Harbour Stadium and the nearby Marist Rugby ground. Nine teams took part Australia, Great Britain, Tokelau, Tonga, Cook Islands, Niue, Samoa, New Zealand Maori and New Zealand. The initial format was three pools of three, with the top six teams moving into two subsequent pools of three. The top four teams then contested elimination semi-finals.

== Teams ==
Team	Appearance	Nickname	Coach	Captain
Australia	2nd	Jillaroos	Dave Leat	Karyn Murphy
Cook Islands	1st	Moana	Tom Bishop	Debbie Dorman
Great Britain	2nd	Lionesses	Jackie Sheldon	Brenda Dobek
New Zealand	2nd	Kiwi Ferns	Lawrence Brydon	Luisa Avaiki
New Zealand Māori	1st	Wahine Toa	Greg Brown	Kellie Kiwi
Niue	1st		Meke Lokeni	
Samoa	1st	Fetu Samoa	George Apelii Tuimaseve	
Tokelau	1st		Tony Lajpold	
Tonga	1st	Mate Ma'a Tonga Womens		Celestyana (Tiana) Valu

== Matches ==
Phase one The nine teams were grouped into three pools of three.

28 September 2003

Great Britain	28 - 12	Samoa
Tries: 5 Natalie Parsons 2 Becky Jones 2 Sally Milburn; Goals: 4 Brenda Dobek 4	Scorers; Result	Tries: 3 H Tuimavave; T Elisara; L Tuioti; Goals: nil

North Harbour Stadium
Referee: Grant Wharehoka

28 September 2003

New Zealand Māori	24 - 28	Australia
Tries: 6 R Wikeepa 2 A Waikai 2 C Stainton; Rochelle Potaka; Goals: nil	Result; Australian; Scorers	Tries: 5 Leah Williams 2 Erin Elliott; Caryl Jarrett; Roslyn Simpson; Goals: 4 Tracey Thompson 4

North Harbour Stadium
Referee: Adrian Purnell

28 September 2003

New Zealand	68 - 0	Cook Islands
Tries: 15; Tamaku Paul 4 Honey Hireme 3 Marion Heather 2 Tessa Te Kahu 2 Cynthia Ta'ala; Mere Baker; Trish Hina; Nadene Conlon; Goals: 4 Marion Heather 2 Trish Hina; Teasha Leka	Scorers; Result

North Harbour Stadium
Referee: Leon Williamson

30 September 2003

Cook Islands	30 - 16	Tokelau
Tries: 7 C Marsters 2 A Tikinau; A Parai; T Larkins; E Mani; T Vano; Goals: 1 C Marsters	Scorers; Result	Tries: 4 M Wilson; L Baker; J Lenusio; A Pedro; Goals: nil

North Harbour Stadium
Referee: Mike Ropata

30 September 2003

New Zealand Māori	44 - 0	Niue
Tries: 9 P Hohepa 2 R Wikeepa; N Emery; A Turner; J Puitau; Vicki Letele; Rochelle Potaka; H Timu; Goals: 4 I Whakatihi 2 Rochelle Potaka 2	Scorers; Result

North Harbour Stadium
Referee: Tony Portland

30 September 2003

Tonga	4 - 44	Samoa
Tries: 1 S Pasikala; Goals: nil	Scorers; Result	Tries: 11; H Tuimavave 5 Jean Oti 2 A Levi; M Laumatia; L Fa'apito; T Malaitai; Goals: nil

North Harbour Stadium
Referee: Warwick Freeman

2 October 2003

Great Britain	54 - 0	Tonga
Tries: 10 (Note: The League Express match report has Nicola Simpson scoring 3 tries and Dannielle Titterington not scoring. The NZRL Almanack has Nicola Simmpson scoring 2 tries and Dannielle Titterington scoring one try.); Stacey Greenwood 3 Nicola Simpson 3 Lindsay Anfield; Stacey Doherty; Sally Milburn; Renee Gregorie; Goals: 7 Natalie Parsons 7	HT: 28-0; Report; Scorers; Result

North Harbour Stadium
Referee: Adrian Purnell

2 October 2003

New Zealand	84 - 0	Tokelau
Tries: 17; Fuarosa Time 6 Selena Te Amo 3 Marion Heather 2 Kelly Leota 2 Laura Mariu; Mere Baker; Trish Hina; Nadene Conlon; Goals: 8 Sarai Sue 6 Kelly Leota 2	HT: 48-0; Scorers; Result

Marist Rugby Grounds
Referee: Grant Wharehoka

2 October 2003

Australia	58 - 0	Niue
Tries: 11; Rebecca Tavo 4 Caryl Jarrett 1 Tracey Thompson 1 Roslyn Simpson 1 Katrina Fanning 1 Leah Williams 1 Tahnee Norris 1 Lisa Holder 1 Goals: 7 Tracey Thompson 7	HT: 32-0; Scorers; Scorers

North Harbour Stadium
Referee: Mike Ropata

Great Britain (two wins) led Samoa (one win) and Tonga in their pool. Australia (two wins) led Māori (one win) and Niue. New Zealand (two wins) led the Cook Islands (one win) and Tokelau. Standings after the first phase were New Zealand (1st, 4 points, +140 differential), Great Britain 4 (2nd, 4, +70), Australia (3rd, 4, +62), New Zealand Māori (4th, 2, +40), Samoa (5th, 2, +24), Cook Islands (6th, 2, -50), Tokelau (7th, 0, -90), Tonga (8th, 0, -94) and Niue (9th, 0, -101).

Phase two The three teams without a win in the first phase were placed in the same pool. Samoa (5th after phase one) joined Australia (3rd) and New Zealand (1st) in a pool. The other pool included Great Britain (2nd), Māori (4th) and Cook Islands (6th).

4 October 2003

New Zealand	44 - 4	Australia
Tries: 10; Luisa Avaiki 2 Cynthia Ta'ala 2 Marion Heather 2 Lovey Tawhai; Tamaku Paul; Tafele Chan Ting; Lorena Papalii; Goals: 2 Marion Heather 2	Report; Scorers	Tries: 1 Tarah Westera; Goals: nil

North Harbour Stadium
Referee: Adrian Purnell

4 October 2003

New Zealand Māori	10 - 8	Great Britain
Tries: 2 R Wikeepa; Vicki Letele; Goals: 1 P Hohepa	HT: 6-4; Report; Scorers; Result; Result	Tries: 2 Natalie Parsons; Stacey Greenwood; Goals: nil

North Harbour Stadium
Referee: Grant Wharehoka

4 October 2003

Tokelau	28 - 4	Tonga
Tries: 6 M Wilson; J Finau; O Pereira; L Baker; P Puka; A Pedro; Goals: 2 N Silau	Scorers; Result	Tries: 1 V Toluta'u; Goals: nil

North Harbour Stadium

6 October 2003

New Zealand	84 - 0	Samoa
Tries: 16; Trish Hina 5 Fuarosai Time 3 Honey Hireme 3 Tamakau Paul 2 Leah Witehira 1 Luisa Avaiki 1 Khadine Pohatu 1 Goals: 10; Trish Hina 10	HT: 34-0; Scorers

North Harbour Stadium
Referee: Carey Smith

6 October 2003

Great Britain	20 - 20	Cook Islands
Tries: 4 Stacey Greenwood 2 Sally Milburn; Michelle Wood; Goals: 2 Brenda Dobek	HT: 12-4; Fixture; Scorers	Tries: 4 T Wilson 3 C Marsters; Goals: 2 C Marsters; A Parai

North Harbour Stadium
Referee: Warwick Freeman

6 October 2003

Tokelau	14 - 22	Niue
Tries: 3 N Sootaga 2 A Pedro; Goals: 1 N Silau	HT: 4-14; Fixture; Scorers	Tries: 5 C Fanamanu 2 S Comer; J Piaso; S Ikifitu; Goals: 1 O Bloomfield

North Harbour Stadium
Referee: Adrian Purnell

8 October 2003

New Zealand Māori	46 - 0	Cook Islands
Tries: 10; H Timu 2 M Emery 2 A Waikai 2 K Klay; K Kiwi; A Turner; H Taute; Goals: 3 Rochelle Potaka 2 K Kiwi	Scorers; Result

North Harbour Stadium
Referee: Leon Williamson

8 October 2003

Niue	14 - 14	Tonga
Tries: 3 S Comer; S Aisoli; S Fanokehe; Goals: 1 D Bloomfield	HT:14-0; Scorers; Scorers	Tries: 3 O Moimoi; S Alatini; W Fisilau; Goals: 1 S Alatini

North Harbour Stadium
Referee: Glen Wilson

8 October 2003

Australia	40 - 12	Samoa
Tries: 7 Tarah Westera 2 Teresa Anderson; Karyn Murphy; Karley Banks; Leah Williams; Neena Fraser; Goals: 6 Tracey Thompson 6	HT: 20-12; Scorers; Scorers	Tries: 2 T Lefale; L Tuioti; Goals: 2 J Oti; L Tuioti

North Harbour Stadium
Referee: Tony Portland

Bowl and Plate Semi-Finals
The New Zealand - Australia - Samoa phase two pool finished in that order, New Zealand with two wins, Australia one and Samoa nil. The other qualifying pool finished with Māori on top with two wins, and Great Britain and Cook Islands drawing their match. Great Britain, who had a better points difference, as well as two wins to one from the phase one pools, advanced to the semi-final.
In the consolation pool, Niue (one win, one draw) led Tokelau (one win) and Tonga (one draw).
The Plate and Bowl semi-finals featured Cook Islands, Tokelau, Samoa and Niue. Curiously, the source article in Rugby League Review does not elaborate on why Tonga replaced Niue in the Bowl Final. However, Niue's point were higher so they stay in Plate category while Tonga went to Bowl

10 October 2003

Cook Islands	18 - 12	Tokelau
Tries: 4 M Tuarae 2 S Utanga; A Parai; Goals: 1 A Parai	Scorers; Result	Tries: 3 N Silau; N Alesana; T Ariu; Goals: nil

North Harbour Stadium
Referee: Warwick Freeman

10 October 2003

Samoa	24 - 18	Niue
Tries: 6 D Sipili 3 T Elisara; M Sao-Filipo; M Laumatia; Goals: nil	Scorers; Result	Tries: 4 S Comer; J Piaso; S Fanokehe; E Telfer; Goals: 1 S Fanokehe

North Harbour Stadium
Referee: Sharlene Strawbridge

Bowl Final

12 October 2003

Tokelau	26 - 12	Tonga
Tries: 6 J Lenusio 2 V Toloa 2 L Baker; A Teuia; Goals: 1 N Silau	Scorers; Result	Tries: 3 U Kaufusi 3 Goals: nil

North Harbour Stadium
Referee: Mike Ropata

Plate Final

12 October 2003

Samoa	28-18	Cook Islands
Tries: 6 M Laumatia 2 H Tuimavave; T Lefale; L Tuioti; Jean Oti; Goals: 2 Jean Oti 2	Scorers; Result	Tries: 3 A Parai; D Dorman; A Tikinau; Goals: 3 A Parai 2 S Utanka

North Harbour Stadium
Referee: Grant Wharehoka

== Semi-finals ==
10 October 2003

New Zealand	38 - 0	Great Britain
Tries: 7 Honey Hireme 2 Fuarosai Time; Tamaku Paul; Trish Hina; Leah Witehira; Lovey Tawhai; Goals: 5 Trish Hina 5	HT: 22-0; Scorers

North Harbour Stadium
Referee: Leon Williamson

10 October 2003

New Zealand Māori	12 - 4	Australia
Tries: 2 H Taute 2 Goals: 2 Rochelle Potaka 2	HT: 0-4; Scorers	Tries: 1 Roslyn Simpson; Goals: nil

North Harbour Stadium
Referee: Carey Smith

== Final ==
12 October 2003

New Zealand	58 - 0	New Zealand Maori
Tries: 11; Honey Hireme 2 Selena Te Amo 2 Leah Witehira; Luisa Avaiki; Tamakau Paul; Mere Baker; Trish Hina; Tessa Te Kahu; Laura Mariu; Goals: 7 Trish Hina 7	HT: 28-0; Report

North Harbour Stadium
Referee: Adrian Purnell

== Team of the Tournament ==
At the conclusion of the tournament, the Lion Foundation World Cup Team 2003 was announced.

#	Position	Player	T	G	Pts
1	Fullback	Cynthia Ta'ala	3	0	12
2	Wing	Selena Edmonds (Te Amo)	5	0	20
3	Centre	Rebecca Tavo	4	0	16
4	Centre	Honey Hireme	10	0	40
5	Wing	Tamaku Paul	9	0	36
6	Five-eighth	Trish Hina	9	23	82
7	Halfback	Leah Witehira	3	0	12
8	Prop	Vicki Letele	2	0	8
9	Hooker	Tafale Chan Ting	1	0	4
10	Prop	Luisa Avaiki	4	0	16
11	Second-row	Nadene Conlon	2	0	8
12	Second-row	Sam Brooke	0	0	0
13	Lock	Lorina Buckley (Papali'i)	1	0	4
14	interchange	Sally Milburn	3	0	12
15	interchange	Rochelle Potaka	2	6	20
16	interchange	Tahnee Norris	2	0	8
17	interchange	Lovey Tawhi	2	0	8

The following staff were also named in the tournament team: Coach: Lawrence Brydon (NZ), Manager: Juanita Woodhouse (NZ), Trainer: Bob Vercoe (NZ)

Luisa Avaiki was named Player of the Tournament.
