= Rugby League Samoa =

Sports governing body in Samoa

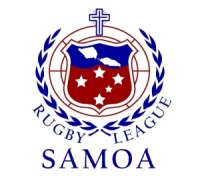
- Founded: 1949
- IRL affiliation: 1962 (Test nation)
- APRL affiliation: 2010 (full; founder)
- Responsibility: Samoa

(Samoa)
- As of 1 July 2009

Rugby League Samoa are the governing body for rugby league in Samoa. They are based in the capital Apia, the League has suffered financially due to member leagues not paying affiliation fees.

== History ==
They were founded in 1949 and have been members of the Rugby League International Federation since 1974.

Along with the governing bodies of Tonga, Samoa, Fiji and the Cook Islands, they founded the Asia-Pacific Rugby League Confederation in December 2009.
