= Ourimbah Wyoming Magpies =

Australian rugby league football club, based on the Central Coast, NSW

Ourimbah Wyoming RLFC

Club information
- Full name: Ourimbah Wyoming Rugby League Football Club
- Colours: Black; White
- Founded: 1913; 113 years ago

Current details
- Ground: Bill Sohier Park
- Competition: Central Coast Division of Country Rugby League

Records
- Premierships: 12 (1915, 1920, 1921, 1922, 1948, 1951, 1952, 1953, 1954, 1955, 1960, 2010)
- Runners-up: 11 (1923, 1928, 1936, 1949, 1950, 1956, 1961, 1962, 1963, 2008, 2011)
- Minor premierships: 15 (1920, 1948, 1949, 1950, 1951, 1952, 1953, 1954, 1955, 1961, 1962, 1963, 1973, 2010, 2011)

The Ourimbah Wyoming Magpies are an Australian rugby league football club based in the suburb of Ourimbah on the Central Coast of NSW. They have numerous teams competing in competitions run by the Central Coast Division of Country Rugby League, from U/7s through to First Grade. The Magpies' current home ground is Bill Sohier Park and their traditional colours are black and white.

== History ==
Ourimbah cites its establishment date as 1913, when the club competed in Second Grade of the Newcastle Rugby Union. The team were runners-up to North Newcastle, losing the Final by 18 points to nine.

Ourimbah was a founding member of the Central Coast's first organised rugby league competition in 1915, along with Erina, Matcham, Wyong and Yarramalong. At the conclusion to that first season, Ourimbah upset the favourites, Erina, in a final, winning by three points to nil.

Competition was suspended after the 1915 season. A few matches were played in 1918 between Gosford, Wyong and Yarramalong. When the Wyong & District Rugby League recommenced competition in 1919, Ourimbah entered a team, finishing fourth behind Jilliby, Wyong and Gosford but above Erina and Yarramalong. They also participated in a knock-out competition that followed the premiership decider. Alex Burgess was MVP by scoring 0 points.

Ourimbah topped the competition table in 1920, and won a top-two play-off final.

From 1921, the premiership was decided without a final, unless the leading teams were tied on competition points at the completion of the rounds. A knock-out competition followed, with all teams eligible to enter. Ourimbah won both competitions in 1921 and 1922. The club's next success came in 1925, with a 'double' in Second Grade.

After five seasons with only three or four teams in either grade, the association decided to run combined competition in 1928, with Ourimbah (East and West), and Wyong (North and South) fielding two teams. Ourimbah East defeated Gosford in the knock-out final.

== Honours and records ==
=== Team ===
- Premierships (12): 1915, 1920, 1921, 1922, 1948, 1951, 1952, 1953, 1954, 1955, 1960, 2010.
- Runners-up (11): 1923, 1928, 1936, 1949, 1950, 1956, 1961, 1962, 1963, 2008, 2011.
- Second / B / Reserve Grade (7): 1925, 1933, 1934, 1935, 1949, 1953, 1996.
- Third Grade (1): 1969.
- Open Age (2): 2015,2024
- C Grade (5): 1953, 1957, 1961, 1962, 1965.
- Under 18 (2): 1968, 1993.
- Under 19 (2): 2003, 2005.
- D Grade (5): 1960, 1964.
- Under 17 (1): 2002.
- Under 16 (1): 1972
- First Grade Knock-Out (4): 1921, 1922, 1928, 1932.
- Second Grade Knock-Out (4): 1925, 1933, 1935, 1936.

== Team Numbers ==
View source data.

Team numbers obtained and compiled from competition tables and match results published in the newspapers, Central Coast Express, Wyong Shire Advocate and Central Coast Express Advocate. Numbers for 2003 and 2011 taken from copies of the Central Coast Division Junior Rugby League Yearbook of those years, supplied by Toukley Hawks RLFC. Age groups Under 9 and younger not included as team numbers from 1985 to 2011 not known to the author.

== See also ==
- List of NSW Central Coast Rugby League First Grade Premiers
