= Terrigal Sharks =

Junior Rugby League Club, NSW, Australia

Terrigal Wamberal Junior Rugby League and Youth Club

Club information
- Full name: Terrigal Wamberal Junior Rugby League Football Club
- Colours: Sky Blue; Black; White
- Founded: 1975; 51 years ago

Current details
- Ground: Brendan Franklin Oval, Terrigal
- Competition: Rugby League Central Coast

Records
- Premierships: 2 (1986, 2017)
- Runners-up: nil
- Minor premierships: 2 (2012, 2013)

The Terrigal Wamberal Junior Sharks are an Australian Youth Rugby League Football Club based in the suburbs of Terrigal and Wamberal on the Central Coast of NSW. They have numerous teams competing in competitions run by Rugby League Central Coast, from U5’s through to U17’s. The Sharks' home ground is Brendan Franklin Oval. Their traditional colours are sky blue, black and white.

== History ==
The then village of Terrigal entered teams in local rugby league competitions in 1921 and 1922, and in Second Grade only, in 1931 and 1932.

The current club was established in 1975, when Terrigal-Wamberal fielded teams in six of eight 'Schoolboys' competitions: Under 8s, 9s, 10s, 12s, 13s and 14s. The senior club began in 1976, with teams in First Grade, Reserve Grade and Under 18s.

Good seasons by the Under 16 team in 1978 and Third Grade in 1979, both making the Final, was followed in 1980 by Terrigal-Wamberal reaching the final of the Southern Division Knock-Out Competition, and finishing equal second in First Grade. In late June, Terrigal defeated Campbelltown City (8-5) and Warilla (23-5) to qualify for the knock-out final, but lost to hosts, Woy Woy, 10-2. In August, having been allotted third place on for and against, Terrigal faced Gosford in a minor semi-final. After an exchange of penalty goals, the Sharks scored in the corner late in the first stanza, to lead 5-4 at half-time. The lead was extended with a penalty, but the Townies capitalised on a line-break with ten minutes to go, to score the winning try.

Terrigal's youth teams, Under 19 and Under 17, made the finals in 1982 ahead a strong performance by the club in 1983. All four teams played semi-finals and Third Grade reached the club's first senior Grand Final. The three grades repeated this effort in 1984, Thirds again finishing runners-up.

First Grade missed the finals in 1985, but Terrigal's Reserve Grade, Third Grade and Under 18 teams each finished in a top two position. After drawing their major semi-final match twice (19-all and 8-all), the Sharks' Reserve Grade lost a second replay, 26-18. Terrigal defeated Umina 16-8 on the Tuesday night to reach the Grand Final. In their fifth match in fifteen days, a penalty goal gave Terrigal in early lead, but Gosford capitalised on a "feast of possession" to cross the line for a 6-2 half time lead. A converted try and penalty by the Townies extended the gap. A late Sharks' try saw the score 14-6 at full time.

Terrigal's Under 18 team took a more direct route to the 1985 Grand Final, winning their major semi-final against Woy Woy 16-0. Having progressed from fourth place, Wyong began the Grand Final well and took a 12-nil lead in the opening 15 minutes. Despite a strong response from Terrigal through the remainder of the match, Wyong held on to win, 12-10. Third Grade had succumbed to Wyong (38-4) and eventual premiers Woy Woy.

The club's growing strength was realised in 1986 when First Grade, Third Grade and Under 18s qualified for the finals. Terrigal's First and Third Grade teams both trailed in their minor semi-final prior to over-running their opponents in the second-half. One week later, the Under 18s won their major semi-final over minor premiers Wyong. Third Grade faltered in their Final, but First Grade won through, again over-turning a half-time deficit (2-8) to win 16-14 and join the Under 18s on Grand Final day.

The team named for Terrigal-Wamberal's maiden Grand Final was Alan Denson (1), John Tiwha (2), Mark Powell (3), Bill Bond (4), Andrew Crowther (5), Steve McCoy (6), Colin Wormleaton (7), Trevor Woods (8), Michael Stone (9), Tony Sopp (10), David McPherson (11, Coach), Craig McNee (12) and Keith Cook (13).

Terrigal's Under 18 team claimed the club's first premiership when they defeated Wyong in the opening match of Grand Final Day. The Sharks opened the scoring with a penalty goal, then the Roos responded with a converted try. Two Terrigal tries followed, both unconverted, prior to half-time. The second stanza was scoreless, thus Terrigal won by 10 to 6.

In First Grade Terrigal, "got off to a rousing start when giant winger John Tiwha flashed down the grandstand side of the ground before sending a pass infield. It went to ground but five-eighth Mark Skinner was on the spot to scoop it up and dive over wide out." Woy Woy replied with a try, converted to lead 6-4. The Sharks then used a "feast of possession" to press the Roosters line for a sustained but unsuccessful period up to half-time. A second Terrigal try was created by the combination of Mark Powell breaking the defensive line and Col Wormleaton regathering his own kick. Woy Woy again responded to reclaim the lead, 12-10. A line-break from Powell and a run from Tiwha took Terrigal within two metres of the try-line. A passing movement with "the tired Woy Woy defence in disarray" allowed Steve McCoy to score under the posts. Woy Woy persevered, and in the last minute were ruled to have lost the ball inches from the try-line. Final Score: Terrigal 16 Woy Woy 12. Mark Powell was named the Central Coast Express man-of-the-match.

== Honours and records ==
=== Team ===
- Premierships (2): 1986, 2017
- Second / Reserve Grade (2): 1989, 2006.
- Open Age (1): 2012.
- Ladies League Tag: 2017
- Under 19 (3): 2006, 2011, 2015
- Under 18 (2): 1986, 2009.
- Under 17 (2): 2011, 2016.
- Under 16 (4): 1985, 1992, 1993, 2008.

== Team numbers ==
In the 2025 season Terrigal Wamberal Junior Sharks fielded 46 team from Under 5’s through to Under 17’s. This included 5 Female Tackle teams and 6 Female League Tag teams.

== Notable juniors ==
- Glenn Morrison (1996-11 Balmain, Norths, North Queensland Cowboys, Parramatta Eels & Wakefield Trinity Wildcats)
- Tim Moltzen (2008-14 Wests Tigers)
- Josh Drinkwater (2014- St George Illawarra Dragons & Wests Tigers)
- Connor Watson (2016-17 Sydney Roosters) (2018 Newcastle Knights)
- Daniel Saifiti (2016- Newcastle Knights)
- Jacob Saifiti (2016- Newcastle Knights)
- Scott Drinkwater (2018-Melbourne Storm)

== See also ==
- List of NSW Central Coast Rugby League First Grade Premiers
