= Umina Beach Bunnies =

Australian rugby league club, based on the Central Coast, NSW

Club information
- Full name: Umina Beach Bunnies Rugby League Football Club
- Nickname: Bunnies
- Colours: Red; Green
- Founded: 1961; 65 years ago
- Website: www.facebook.com/uminabunnies2013

Current details
- Ground: Col Gooley Field, Umina Beach
- Competition: Newcastle & Hunter Rugby League (Seniors) and Central Coast Rugby League (Juniors)

Records
- Premierships: 3 (1983, 1994, 2005)
- Runners-up: 8 (1974, 1980, 1984, 1985, 2004, 2006, 2007, 2012)
- Minor premierships: 6 (1974, 1980, 1983, 1984, 1994, 2005)

The Umina Beach Bunnies is a rugby league club based on the Central Coast, New South Wales region of Australia.

In 2017, the club entered two senior teams in the Newcastle & Hunter Rugby Leagues, a men's team in A Grade and a women's team in the Ladies League tag. The club entered 11 junior teams in the Central Coast Rugby League, from Under 6 to Under 14 age groups.

== History ==
Umina Beach Bunnies were formed in 1961 first under the name Umina Ettalong United Bunnies.

Umina won their inaugural First Grade Premiership in 1983, defeating Gosford in extra-time of a Grand Final Replay. At full-time in both matches the score was 10-all. In the first match there was no further score, but in the second Umina scored four tries in the twenty minutes to win. 26-10.

Umina won a second title in 1994, defeating Wyong by 32 points to 24.

Umina defeated Woy Woy, 22-14, to win their third First Grade Premiership in 2005.

== Home ground ==
Col Gooley Oval, the oval adjacent to the Umina Beach SLSC (Surf Life Savers Club) is the home ground for the club.

== Notable Juniors ==
- Chris Heighington (2003-18 Wests Tigers, Cronulla Sharks & Newcastle Knights)
- Brayden Wiliame (2013- Parramatta Eels & Manly Sea Eagles)
- Nicho Hynes (2019- Melbourne Storm & Cronulla Sharks)
- Troy Mansell (1990s- South Sydney Rabbitohs Allegedly Played For Them)

== Honours and records ==
=== Team ===
- Premierships (3): 1983, 1994, 2005.
- Runners-up (8): 1974, 1980, 1984, 1985, 2004, 2006, 2007, 2012.
- Second / B / Reserve Grade (3): 1973, 1974, 2012.
- Third Grade (3): 1972, 1983, 1991.
- Under 19 (1): 1982.
- Under 18 (1): 1983.
- Under 17 (1): 2001.

== Team Numbers ==
Team numbers obtained and compiled from competition tables and match results published in the newspapers, Central Coast Express, Wyong Shire Advocate and Central Coast Express Advocate. Numbers for 2003 and 2011 taken from copies of the Central Coast Division Junior Rugby League Yearbook of those years, supplied by Toukley Hawks RLFC. Age groups Under 9 and younger not included as team numbers from 1985 to 2011 not known to the author.

== See also ==
- Central Coast Rugby League Competition
