= List of NSW Central Coast Rugby League First Grade Premiers =

This is a list of the winners of First Grade Rugby League Premiership competitions held on the Central Coast of New South Wales, Australia.

The current competition is conducted under the auspices of the Central Coast Division Rugby League, an affiliate of NSW Country Rugby League and the New South Wales Rugby League.

== First Grade Premiers ==
=== Background ===
Football matches under Rugby Union rules were played by clubs from Gosford, Ourimbah and Wyong in the years 1905, 1906 and 1907. From 1908 to 1911, Wyong entered a team in the Newcastle Rugby Union competitions.

During 1911 Gosford Football Club played both Union and League matches. Rugby League teams from the NSWRFL lower grade competitions visited and played against Gosford: Balmain on 15 July and South Sydney Federal on 2 September.

Wyong joined the Newcastle Rugby League competition in 1912, competing in Second Grade that season and in 1913 and 1914.

=== 1915 to 1936 ===
The first Rugby League association on the Central Coast was inaugurated in May 1915. Competition matches were played in June. Ourimbah defeated Erina in a Final on 29 August. The other teams competing were Matcham, Wyong and Yarramalong.

No competition took place in 1916 or 1917 and in 1918 only a few matches were played.

Competition Rugby League was revived in 1919. The season format was to conduct a premiership competition, in which all teams played the same number of matches, followed by a knock-out. From 1920 until 1932, the Knock-Out involved all teams.

Premiership and Knock-Out Competition Winners in First and Second Grade
Season		Numbers			First Grade					Second Grade	
Assoc	Year	G	C	T	1GT	Premiers	Decider	Points Score	Knock Out	Premiers	Knock Out
W&DRL	1915	1	5	5	5	Ourimbah	Top Two Final	Leading Teams		—	—
W&DRL	1919	1	6	6	6	Jilliby	Play-Off Final	Full Table	Jilliby	—	—
W&DRL	1920	1	7	7	7	Ourimbah	Top Two Final	Points Score	Erina	—	—
W&DRL	1921	2	8	12	6	Ourimbah	No (Knock Out)	Full Table	Ourimbah	Gosford	Gosford
W&DRL	1922	2	5	10	5	Ourimbah	No (Knock Out)	Full Table	Ourimbah	Gosford	Gosford
W&DRL	1923	2	5	9	4	Erina	No (Knock Out)	Full Table	Wyong	Erina	Erina
W&DRL	1924	2	5	7	4	Erina	No (Knock Out)		Erina	Erina	Erina
GDRFL	1925	2	4	7	3	Gosford	No (Knock Out)	Winner Named	Gosford	Ourimbah	Ourimbah
GDFA	1926	2	6	8	4	Gosford	No (Knock Out)	Points Score	Wyong	Gosford	Wyong
WDRFL	1927	2	4	7	3	Gosford		Winner Named	Wyong	Wyong	Wyong
WDRFL	1928	1	5	8	7	Wyong South	Play-Off Final	Full Table	Ourimbah East	—	—
WDRFL	1929					Wyong		Winner Named	Wyong	Ourimbah	Ourimbah
ESDRFL	1930	2	6	11	6	Wyong	No (Knock Out)	Full Table	Wyong	Wyong	Gosford
ESRFL	1931	2	8	14	7	Wyong	No (Knock Out)	Full Table	Dora Creek	Erina	Erina
ESRFL	1932	2	11	18	9	Wyong	No (Knock Out)	Winner Named	Ourimbah	Gosford	Wyong
ESRFL	1933	2	8	15	7	Morisset	No (Knock Out)	Points Score	Morisset	Ourimbah	Ourimbah
ESRFL	1934	2	8	16	8	Morisset (1st); Wyong (Club)	No (Knock Out)	Winner Named	Woy Woy	Ourimbah	Wyong
ESRFL	1935	2	4	8	4	Morisset	No (Knock Out)	Winner Named	Morisset	Ourimbah	Ourimbah
ESRFL	1936	2	4	8	4	Wyong	No (Knock Out)	Points Score	Wyong	Wyong	Ourimbah

Gaps in the table in 1927 and 1929 are due to the limited availability of issues of the Gosford Times in those years. A list of previous winners was, however, published in the Wyong Advocate in 1932.

In 1928 the Association decided to hold only a Second Grade competition. Ourimbah and Wyong fielded two teams. Gosford entered their First Grade team in the North Sydney Juniors competition and their Second Grade competed in the local competition. In 1931, however, a newspaper article stated that Wyong had won the last four first grade competitions. This suggests that the local competition of 1928 was elevated to First Grade status.

In 1933 Kincumber won a Knock-Out Final but premiers Morisset were able to challenge them in a Grand Final.

In 1934 a Club Competition was conducted and given prominence. Points from both grades counted, though first grade points were worth double (i.e. four points for a win). Wyong and Morisset initially finished level on 59 Club Championship points. A play-off final was held, which Morisset won. However, on appeal to the parent body, Newcastle Rugby League, a protest that the local association had dismissed was overturned. Wyong were awarded an additional four points for a first grade game they had lost, in which Ourimbah fielded an unregistered player.

Earlier in 1934 Woy Woy defeated a depleted Ourimbah team by 102 to nil in a First Grade match.

=== 1937 to 1939 ===
In 1932 Gosford Football Club began playing challenge matches, separate from the competition matches played on Saturdays. The format was to invite teams from outside the district to play matches at Gosford Showground. The team that defeated Gosford by the biggest margin was invited back at the end of the season to play a grand final for a trophy cup.

Woy Woy left the local competition and adopted this format in 1935, arranging their own challenge matches and grand final each year until 1939. In 1937 they ran the challenge in two grades, with the B grade team named Ettalong. In 1939, both grade teams in the Woy Woy challenge cup were named Ettalong.

Competition in a league format did not take place between 1937 and 1939. A meeting of the Erina Shire Rugby Football League in May 1937 decided to suspend the competition, attributing to a decline of interest in Saturday football to a rise in SP betting. The lodgement of protests had become common in the mid 1930s and this may have also contributed.

Gosford's 1939 Challenge Cup Grand Final was postponed due to the outbreak of war.

=== 1940 to 1946 ===
Challenge Cup matches were played in 1940 mostly by Gosford and Ourimbah. Wyong club was revived and played a few games. Ettalong played at least one match, visiting Ourimbah on 19 May.

Just seven issues of the Gosford Times are available for the seven years, 1941 to 1948, so information on Central Coast football during this time is limited. Ourimbah and Woy Woy hosted challenge matches in 1941. Rugby League in the years 1942 to 1944 may have been restricted to school football – Gosford High School hosted Randwick in July 1943.

Wyong competed in the Newcastle Third Grade competition in 1945, along with ten other teams. They made the semi-finals, playing at Newcastle Sports Ground on 25 August, but were beaten, 14 to 8, by Newcastle's Northern Suburbs club.

The following year, 1946, Wyong fielded two grade sides in a Southern Newcastle competition. Two rounds of matches were played against the four other competitors. Wyong's A grade team finished third, between finalists Belmont and Morisset, and Cardiff and Lake Macquarie. In B grade, Wyong upset minor premiers Belmont in the final, prompting a Grand Final the following week.

On 1 September 1946 Ourimbah won Gosford's Challenge Cup, by 6 to 3, but lost their own Cup grand finals the following Sunday, being beaten 19 to 8 by BHP Newcastle in A grade, and 18 to nil by Central Newcastle's Under 18 team in B grade.

=== 1947 to 2009 ===
In February 1947 an annual meeting of the Brisbane Water Rugby League Football Association elected office bearers. By early April, a draw was published, now under the name Central Coast Rugby League Football Association. The five clubs in the 1947 competition were Morisset, Ourimbah, The Entrance, Woy Woy and Wyong. Gosford continued to run their challenge cup in 1947 but joined the local league in 1948. Erina club was formed to enter the 1949 competition. Morisset, however, did not participate in 1949.

The format involved the completion of a league of regular season matches to determine the minor premier. The top four teams were then to play in a final series to determine the major premier. Initially, if the minor premier was beaten in either their semi-final or the final, they had a right to challenge the winner of the final in a Grand Final.

From 1950 to 1966, the Grades were more commonly referred to as A, B, C and D.

Season		Numbers			A Grade or First Grade				
Assoc	Year	G	C	T	1GT	Premiers	Decider	Points Score	Minor Premiers
CCRLFA	1947	3	5	15	5	Wyong	Final	Winner Named	Wyong
CCRLFA	1948	3	6	18	6	Ourimbah	Grand Final	Minor Premier	Ourimbah
CCRLFA	1949	3	6	18	6	The Entrance	Replayed GF	Full Table	Ourimbah
CCRLFA	1950	3	6	18	6	Gosford	Grand Final	Points Score	Ourimbah
CCRLFA	1951	3	6	18	6	Ourimbah	Replayed Final	Full Table	Ourimbah
CCRLFA	1952	3	6	18	6	Ourimbah	Final	Points Score	Ourimbah
CCRLFA	1953	3	6	18	6	Ourimbah	Grand Final	Full Table	Ourimbah
CCRLFA	1954	3	7	21	7	Ourimbah	Final	Points Score	Ourimbah
CCRLFA	1955	4	8	27	8	Ourimbah	Final	Points Score	Ourimbah
CCRLFA	1956	4	7	27	7	The Entrance	Grand Final	Full Table	The Entrance
CCRLFA	1957	4	7	26	7	The Entrance	Grand Final	Full Table	The Entrance
CCRLFA	1958	4	7	27	7	Gosford	Grand Final		Gosford
CCRLFA	1959	4	6	22	6	Gosford	Grand Final	Minor Premier	Gosford
CCRLFA	1960	4	6	23	6	Ourimbah	Grand Final		The Entrance
CCRLFA	1961	4	6	24	6	The Entrance	Grand Final	Full Table	Ourimbah
CCRLFA	1962	4	6	24	6	Woy Woy	Grand Final	Full Table	Ourimbah
CCRLFA	1963	4	6	23	6	Gosford	Grand Final	Full Table	Ourimbah
CCRLFA	1964	4	7	28	7	Woy Woy	Grand Final	Full Table	Gosford
CCRLFA	1965	4	7	26	7	Gosford	Grand Final	Full Table	Wyong
CCRLFA	1966	4	7	26	7	Woy Woy	Grand Final	Full Table	Woy Woy
Group 12	1967	4	7	27	7	Woy Woy	Grand Final		Woy Woy
Group 12	1968	5	7	33	7	Wyong	Grand Final	Full Table	Wyong
Group 12	1969	5	8	35	7	Wyong	Grand Final	Minor Premier	Wyong
Group 12	1970	5	8	35	7	Woy Woy	Grand Final	Minor Premier	Woy Woy
Group 12	1971	5	9	35	7	Wyong	Grand Final		Woy Woy
Group 12	1972	5	9	35	7	Woy Woy	Grand Final	Minor Premier	Gosford
Group 12	1973	5	8	35	7	Gosford	Grand Final	Points Score	Ourimbah
Group 12	1974	5	9	36	7	Wyong	Grand Final	Points Score	Umina
Group 12	1975	5	8	34	7	Woy Woy	Grand Final	Minor Premier	Wyong
Group 12	1976	6			8	Woy Woy	Grand Final		Woy Woy
Group 12	1977	6	14	43	8	Erina	Grand Final	Minor Premier	Woy Woy
Group 12	1978	6	16	49	8	Gosford	Grand Final	Full Table	Woy Woy
Group 12	1979	6	14	50	9	Woy Woy	Grand Final	Minor Premier	Woy Woy
Group 12	1980	6	14	51	9	Woy Woy	Grand Final	Full Table	Umina
CCDRL	1981	5	15	46	10	Erina	Grand Final	Full Table	Erina
CCDRL	1982	5	16	46	10	Wyong	Grand Final	Full Table	Woy Woy
CCDRL	1983	5	16	42	9	Umina	Replayed GF	Full Table	Umina
CCDRL	1984	5	15	41	9	Woy Woy	Grand Final		Umina
CCDRL	1985	5	16	43	9	Woy Woy	Grand Final		Woy Woy
CCDRL	1986	5	15	43	9	Terrigal	Grand Final		Woy Woy
CCDRL	1987	5	15	43	9	Woy Woy	Grand Final	Full Table	Woy Woy
CCDRL	1988	5	16	44	9	Erina	Grand Final		Wyong
CCDRL	1989	5	17	45	9	The Entrance	Grand Final	Full Table	The Entrance
CCDRL	1990	5	17	47	9	Wyong	Grand Final	Full Table	Erina
CCDRL	1991	5	17	47	9	Erina	Grand Final	Full Table	Erina
CCDRL	1992	5	17	47	10	Wyong	Grand Final		Wyong
CCDRL	1993	5	17	47	10	The Entrance	Grand Final		Wyong
CCDRL	1994	5	17	46	10	Umina	Grand Final		Umina
CCDRL	1995	5	17	46	10	The Entrance	Grand Final		Wyong
CCDRL	1996	5	17	46	9	Wyong	Grand Final	Full Table	Wyong
CCDRL	1997	5	17	44	9	Wyong	Grand Final	Minor Premier	The Entrance
CCDRL	1998	5	15	39	8	Woy Woy	Grand Final		Woy Woy
CCDRL	1999	5	16	42	9	Woy Woy	Grand Final	Full Table	Woy Woy
CCDRL	2000	5				The Entrance	Grand Final	Minor Premier	Wyong
CCDRL	2001	5	17	41	8	Woy Woy	Grand Final	Full Table	Woy Woy
CCDRL	2002	5	16	37	7	Wyong	Grand Final	Full Table	The Entrance
CCDRL	2003	4	16	35	8	The Entrance	Grand Final		The Entrance
CCDRL	2004	4	17	39	10	The Entrance	Grand Final	Full Table	The Entrance
CCDRL	2005	4	17	38	10	Umina	Grand Final		Umina
CCDRL	2006	4	14	45	12	Woy Woy	Grand Final	Full Table	Woy Woy
CCDRL	2007	5	11	40	10	Woy Woy	Grand Final	Full Table	Umina
CCDRL	2008	4	11	42	10	The Entrance	Grand Final		The Entrance
CCDRL	2009	4	10	40	10	The Entrance	Grand Final	Full Table	The Entrance

C and D grades were intended for the development of younger players. This was formalised in 1967 when they became Under 19 and Under 17 competitions. The first in a number of changes to the age limits occurred in the following season, 1968.

- Under 19 competitions have been held in 1967, 1979–1982, 2000–2008, 2010-2011 and 2014–present.
- Under 18 competitions have been held in 1968–1978, 1983–1999, 2009 and 2012–2013.
- Under 17 competitions have been held in 1967, 1979–1982, 2000–2008, 2010-2011 and 2013. Since 2014, Under 17 competitions have been run by the junior association.
- Under 16 competitions were run by the senior association from 1968 to 1978. From 1983, Under 16 competitions have been run by the junior association.

In 1976, Third Grade was replaced by both an Under 21 and a Second Division competition. The Second Division competition was played on Saturdays, while the five other grades continued to be played on Sundays. The second division had a mix of teams from the district clubs, as well as Davistown, Toukley, Milson Island and Munmorah.

Under 21 became Under 23 in 1977. Third Grade returned in 1978 and ran, but for a two-year gap in the early 1980s, until 1999. Second Division ran until 2005. In 2009, an Under 20 competition was held.

In 2001, The Entrance and Woy Woy finished the regular season on equal points. Despite The Entrance having the superior points difference, Woy Woy were declared winners in the minor premiership by virtue of winning the major semi-final.

==== Clubs ====
Toronto participated from 1954 to 1959. Rathmines in 1955 and South Lakes in 1958. Combined Wyong-Morisset teams competed in 1957, with Wyong dropping out in 1958 before reorganising and returning in 1960. Umina first entered teams in 1964. Mount Penang fielded Under 18 teams from 1969 to 1975. Saint Edwards College fielded Under 16 teams in 1971, 1972 and 1974. Terrigal-Wamberal became the eighth district club in 1976 and Toukley the ninth in 1979. Munmorah fielded first grade teams in 1981 and 1982, but dropped back to second division in 1983.

The 1990s saw a number of changes to participation in the First Grade competition. Munmorah returned in 1992, were renamed as Northern Lakes in 1994 but dropped out in 1998. Berkeley Vale joined in 1995. Toukley dropped back to Second Division in 1995. Umina were unable to field a senior team in the three seasons between 1996 and 1998. Gosford's last season in First Grade was 1999.

In 2003, The Entrance, Erina, Ourimbah and Woy Woy entered teams in the Jim Beam Cup. This meant that their second side participated in the CCDRL First Grade competition. Woy Woy played two seasons, Ourimbah two and a half (withdrawing mid-season in 2005) and Erina five. The Entrance were the most successful of the four Central Coast clubs, winning three premierships (2003, 2007 & 2014) in two stints (2003-2007 and 2010-2014). Also in 2003, Wyong joined the Newcastle competition and fielded teams in both competitions until 2006.

In 2004, the Kincumber Colts entered First Grade and Northern Lakes and Umina returned, after gaps of six and one seasons, respectively. With Second Division discontinued in 2006, Central Wyong and Toukley entered First Grade.

=== 2010 to Present ===
During this period First Grade, Reserve Grade, Open Age and youth competitions have been held. The number and ages in the youth competitions have varied. Since 2014, the senior body has run Under 19s and the junior body Under 17s.
A ladies league tag competition commenced in 2015 and was won by Kincumber. That competition and its teams are included in the number of grades and teams in this table.

Season		Numbers			First Grade					Lower Grade Premiers				Ladies
Assoc	Year	G	C	T	1GT	Premiers	Decider	Points Score	Minor Premiers	Reserve Grade	Open Age	U19/U18	U17	League Tag
CCDRL	2010	5	12	49	10	Ourimbah	Grand Final	Full Table	Ourimbah	Berkeley Vale	Erina	The Entrance	Berkeley Vale	—
CCDRL	2011	5	13	51	10	Berkeley Vale	Grand Final	Full Table	Ourimbah	The Entrance	Central Wyong	Terrigal	Terrigal	—
CCDRL	2012	5	10	44	10	Kincumber	Grand Final	Full Table	Terrigal	Umina Beach	Terrigal	The Entrance	—	—
CCDRL	2013	5	13	50	12	Berkeley Vale	Grand Final	Full Table	Terrigal	Wyong	Northern Lakes	Wyong	Kincumber	—
CCDRL	2014	4	14	45	12	Wyong	Grand Final	Full Table	Berkeley Vale	Berkeley Vale	Wyong	Wyong	Toukley	—
CCDRL	2015	5	13	52	12	The Entrance	Grand Final	Full Table	The Entrance	The Entrance	Ourimbah	Terrigal	Kincumber	Kincumber
CCDRL	2016	5	12	47	10	Wyong	Grand Final	Full Table	Wyong	Kincumber	Berkeley Vale	Wyong	Terrigal	Erina
CCDRL	2017	5	12	48	10	Terrigal	Grand Final	Full Table	Wyong	The Entrance	Erina	Berkeley Vale	Wyong	Terrigal
CCDRL	2018	9	12	47	9	The Entrance	Grand Final	Full Table	The Entrance	The Entrance	Woy Woy	Wyong	Ourimbah	The Entrance

In 2012, two Under 18 competitions were held, Under 18/1s was won by The Entrance and Under 18/2s was won by Kincumber.

== Acronyms ==
- G = Number of Grades
- C = Number of Clubs
- T = Number of Teams.
- 1GT = Number of First Grade Teams
- W&DRL = Wyong and District Rugby League, WDRFL = Wyong District Rugby Football League
- GDRFL = Gosford District Rugby Football League, GDFA = Gosford District Football Association
- ESDRFL = Erina Shire District Rugby Football League, ESRFL = Erina Shire Rugby Football League
- CCRLFA = Central Coast Rugby League Football Association, CCDRL = Central Coast Division Rugby League

== Sources ==
- Digitised newspapers at the National Library of Australia's Trove website

- Gosford Times and Wyong District Advocate
- The Newcastle Herald

- Whilst not used extensively in the production of this list, Microfilm of the following newspapers are available at the State Library of New South Wales and Central Coast Council libraries at Gosford and Wyong. The RAV numbers provided are those used by the State Library.

- Gosford Times (RAV 24 – Reels #1, 1897–1900; #31 to #40, 1955 to 1962)
- Central Coast Express (RAV 61)
- The Guardian (The Entrance and Wyong) (RAV 63 – Reels #1 and #2, 1933–1959 miscellaneous)
- Wyong and Lakes District Advocate (RAV 178 – Reel #2, 1932–1956 miscellaneous)

- Erina Rugby League Football Club
- Woy Woy Roosters
- Fox Sports Pulse
- The following books are available at the Tuggerah Branch of the Central Coast Council Libraries

- George Glading (1995). History of Wyong Rugby League 1893–1995. Kanwal, New South Wales: Wyong Rugby League Club Limited. ISBN 0-646-25613-0.
- A History of The Entrance Rugby League Football Club – From Seagulls to Tigers 1934 to 2012. Bateau Bay, New South Wales: The Entrance Rugby League Football Club. 2013.

- Recollection.
