= Kincumber Colts =

Australian rugby league club, based in Kincumber, NSW

Kincumber Colts RLFC

Club information
- Full name: Kincumber Colts Rugby League Football Club
- Colours: Red; White
- Founded: 1978; 47 years ago

Current details
- Ground(s): MacKillop Oval
- Competition: Central Coast Division of Country Rugby League

Records
- Premierships: 2 (2012, 2025)
- Runners-up: 1 (2015)
- Minor premierships: nil

The Kincumber Colts are an Australian junior rugby league football club based in the suburb of Kincumber, New South Wales. They have numerous teams competing in competitions run by the Central Coast Division of Country Rugby League, from U/7s through to First Grade. The Colts' current home ground is MacKillop Oval and their traditional colours are red and white.

== History ==
The club began with a single team entered into the 1978 Second Division competition. Juniors teams began playing in the early 1980s. Kincumber's first senior competition victory came in 1986 when they were Second Division minor premiers and defeated Budgewoi in the Grand Final.

Grand Finalists in 1991, Kincumber won three successive Second Division premierships in 1992 (beating Budgewoi 11–6), 1993 (beating Central Wyong 16–10), and 1994 (again beating Central Wyong, 16–8).

Kincumber's last season in Second Division was in 2000. The junior club continued during 2001 and 2002. In 2003, Kincumber entered the Under 17 competition. This team finished in second place, and upset league leaders Wyong in the Grand Final.

In 2004, Kincumber entered teams in the First Division, Under 19 and Under 17 competitions.

Kincumber's First Grade team finished the 2012 regular season in third place. The Colts' overcame a loss to Umina in week one on the finals series, to beat Ourimbah-Wyoming, Terrigal-Wamberal to make their maiden First Grade Grand Final Appearance. Kincumber defeated Umina, 12–10, to claim the Premiership.

== Honours and records ==
=== Team ===
- Premierships (2): 2012, 2025.
- Runners-up (1): 2015.
- Reserve Grade (1): 2016.
- Second Division (4): 1986, 1992, 1993, 1994.
- Under 18 Division 2 (1): 2012
- Under 17 (4): 2003, 2006, 2007, 2015.
- Under 16 (6): 1999, 2001, 2005, 2011, 2014, 2018.
- Under 16 Division 2 (1): 2015.
- Ladies League Tag (1): 2015.

== Juniors ==
- Brett Kearney (2003–14 South Sydney Rabbitohs, Bradford Bulls & Cronulla Sharks)
- Ryan Tandy (2003–10 Rabbitohs, Dragons, Melbourne Storm, Tigers & Bulldogs)
- Connor Watson (2016–present Sydney Roosters, Newcastle Knights)
- Tom Starling (2018–present Newcastle Knights, Canberra Raiders)
- Joel Penny – Northern Eagles & South Sydney
- Ben Thomas (2021–present Sydney Roosters)
- Sandon Smith (2023–present Sydney Roosters)
- Grant Wooden (2002–2003 Northern Eagles & Manly-Warringah)
- Kirra Dibb (2019–present Roosters, Warriors, Knights, Cowboys)
- Jasmine Strange (2022–present Sydney Roosters, Newcastle Knights)
- Jayme Fressard (2020–present Brisbane Broncos, Newcastle Knights, Sydney Roosters)
- Ethan Strange (2024- Canberra Raiders)

== Team numbers ==
Team numbers obtained and compiled from competition tables and match results published in the newspapers, Central Coast Express, Wyong Shire Advocate and Central Coast Express Advocate. Numbers for 2003 and 2011 taken from copies of the Central Coast Division Junior Rugby League Yearbook of those years, supplied by Toukley Hawks RLFC. Age groups Under 9 and younger not included as team numbers from 1985 to 2011 not known to the author.

== See also ==
- List of NSW Central Coast Rugby League First Grade Premiers
