= NSW Central Coast Rugby League first-grade grand finals =

This article provides information on the First Grade or A Grade premiership deciders of rugby league competitions held on the Central Coast of New South Wales, Australia. The "Match details" sub-section details the individual point-scorers in a match, where known.

The current competition is conducted under the auspices of the Central Coast Division Rugby League, an affiliate of NSW Country Rugby League and the New South Wales Rugby League.

== List ==
First Grade and A Grade Grand Finals
Season	Teams	Premiers	Runners-up	Score	Match type	Extra time	Venue	Date	Minor premiers
1915	5	Ourimbah	Erina	3–0	Top Two Final	No	At Wyong	Sat 28 Aug 1915	
1919	6	Jilliby	Wyong	5–3	Play-Off Final	No	At Wyong	Sat 30 Aug 1919	
1920	7	Ourimbah	Erina	10–0	Last Round	No	Ourimbah Sportsground	Sat 14 Aug 1920	
1928	7	Wyong South	Ourimbah East	4–2	Play-Off Final	No	Ourimbah Sportsground	Sat 25 Aug 1928	Ourimbah East
1947	5	Wyong	Woy Woy	15–2	Final				3-way tie
1948	6	Ourimbah	The Entrance	15–7	Grand Final			Sun 26 Sep 1948	Ourimbah
1949	6	Ourimbah	The Entrance	7-7	Grand Final	No	At Wyong	Sun 18 Sep 1949	Ourimbah
1949		The Entrance	Ourimbah	15–11	Replay	Yes	Erina Park	Sun 2 Oct 1949	—
1950	6	Gosford	Ourimbah	11–7	Grand Final	No	At Wyong	Sun 27 Aug 1950	Ourimbah
1951	6	Ourimbah	Erina	2-2	Final	No	Grahame Park	Sun 12 Aug 1951	Ourimbah
1951		Ourimbah	Erina	15–2	Replay	No	Grahame Park	Sun 19 Aug 1951	—
1952	6	Ourimbah	Gosford	11–3	Final	No	Grahame Park	Sun 10 Aug 1952	Ourimbah
1953	6	Ourimbah	Erina	27–0	Grand Final	No	Grahame Park	Sun 30 Aug 1953	Ourimbah
1954	7	Ourimbah	The Entrance	22–17	Final	Yes	Grahame Park	Sun 29 Aug 1954	Ourimbah
1955	8	Ourimbah	The Entrance	11–7	Final	No	Grahame Park	Sun 11 Sep 1955	Ourimbah
1956	7	The Entrance	Ourimbah	12–7	Grand Final	No	Grahame Park	Sun 16 Sep 1956	The Entrance
1957	7	The Entrance	Erina	20–2	Grand Final	No		Sun 1 Sep 1957	The Entrance
1958	7	Gosford	The Entrance	16–8	Grand Final	No	Grahame Park	Sun 14 Sep 1958	Gosford
1959	6	Gosford	Erina	8–4	Grand Final	No	The Entrance	Sun 13 Sep 1959	Gosford
1960	6	Ourimbah	Erina	24–12	Grand Final	No	Erina Park	Sun 11 Sep 1960	The Entrance
1961	6	The Entrance	Ourimbah	19–10	Grand Final	No	Grahame Park	Sun 10 Sep 1961	Ourimbah
1962	6	Woy Woy	Ourimbah	12–3	Grand Final	No	Grahame Park	Sun 9 Sep 1962	Ourimbah
1963	6	Gosford	Ourimbah	6–5	Grand Final	No	Grahame Park	Sun 15 Sep 1963	Ourimbah
1964	7	Woy Woy	Gosford	22–3	Grand Final		Sohier Park	Sun 4 Oct 1964	Gosford
1965	7	Gosford	Woy Woy	7–2	Grand Final	No	Sohier Park	Sun 5 Sep 1965	Wyong
1966	7	Woy Woy	Erina	11–9	Grand Final	Yes	Sohier Park	Sun 11 Sep 1966	Woy Woy
1967	7	Woy Woy	Wyong	27–7	Grand Final	No	Grahame Park	Sun 1 Oct 1967	Woy Woy
1968	7	Wyong	Woy Woy	20–2	Grand Final	No	Sohier Park	Sun 15 Sep 1968	Wyong
1969	7	Wyong	Gosford	26–9	Grand Final	No	Sohier Park	Sun 21 Sep 1969	Wyong
1970	7	Woy Woy	Wyong	13–6	Grand Final	No	Grahame Park	Sun 20 Sep 1970	Woy Woy
1971	7	Wyong	Woy Woy	30–25	Grand Final	No	Grahame Park	Sun 26 Sep 1971	Woy Woy
1972	7	Woy Woy	The Entrance	16–12	Grand Final	No	Grahame Park	Sun 10 Sep 1972	Gosford
1973	7	Gosford	Wyong	8–4	Grand Final	No	Grahame Park	Sun 16 Sep 1973	Ourimbah
1974	7	Wyong	Umina	14–6	Grand Final		Grahame Park	Sun 29 Sep 1974	Umina
1975	7	Woy Woy	Wyong	17–9	Grand Final	No	Grahame Park	Sun 21 Sep 1975	Wyong
1976	8	Woy Woy	Erina	19–7	Grand Final	No	Grahame Park	Sun 12 Sep 1976	Woy Woy
1977	8	Erina	Wyong	10–7	Grand Final		Grahame Park	Sun 18 Sep 1977	Woy Woy
1978	8	Gosford	Woy Woy	23–20	Grand Final		Grahame Park	Sun 17 Sep 1978	Woy Woy
1979	9	Woy Woy	Wyong	29–7	Grand Final	No	Grahame Park	Sun 16 Sep 1979	Woy Woy
1980	9	Woy Woy	Umina	19–6	Grand Final	No	Grahame Park	Sun 14 Sep 1980	Umina
1981	10	Erina	Wyong	22–7	Grand Final	No	Grahame Park	Sun 13 Sep 1981	Erina
1982	10	Wyong	Woy Woy	28–10	Grand Final	No	Grahame Park	Sun 19 Sep 1982	Woy Woy
1983	9	Gosford	Umina	10-10	Grand Final	Yes	Grahame Park	Sun 18 Sep 1983	Umina
1983		Umina	Gosford	26–10	Replay	Yes	Grahame Park	Sun 25 Sep 1983	—
1984	9	Woy Woy	Umina	14–6	Grand Final	No	Grahame Park	Sun 16 Sep 1984	Umina
1985	9	Woy Woy	Umina	28–6	Grand Final	No	Grahame Park	Sun 15 Sep 1985	Woy Woy
1986	9	Terrigal	Woy Woy	16–12	Grand Final	No	Grahame Park	Sun 7 Sep 1986	Woy Woy
1987	9	Woy Woy	Wyong	28–12	Grand Final	No	Grahame Park	Sun 6 Sep 1987	Woy Woy
1988	9	Erina	Wyong	12–8	Grand Final	No	Grahame Park	Sun 18 Sep 1988	Wyong
1989	9	The Entrance	Wyong	18–8	Grand Final	No	Grahame Park	Sun 10 Sep 1989	The Entrance
1990	9	Wyong	Erina	8–6	Grand Final	No	Grahame Park	Sun 21 Sep 1975	Erina
1991	9	Erina	Woy Woy	30–8	Grand Final	No	Grahame Park	Sun 1 Sep 1991	Erina
1992	10	Wyong	Erina	16–14	Grand Final	No	Grahame Park	Sun 13 Sep 1992	Wyong
1993	10	The Entrance	Wyong	23–12	Grand Final	No	Grahame Park	Sun 5 Sep 1993	Wyong
1994	10	Umina	Wyong	32–24	Grand Final	No	Grahame Park	Sun 4 Sep 1994	Umina
1995	10	The Entrance	Wyong	8–4	Grand Final	No	Grahame Park	Sun 3 Sep 1995	Wyong
1996	9	Wyong	The Entrance	13–6	Grand Final	No	Grahame Park	Sun 1 Sep 1996	Wyong
1997	9	Wyong	Gosford	32–6	Grand Final	No	Grahame Park	Sun 7 Sep 1997	The Entrance
1998	8	Woy Woy	Erina	16–6	Grand Final	No	Grahame Park	Sun 30 Aug 1998	Woy Woy
1999	9	Woy Woy	Wyong	28–26	Grand Final	No	Woy Woy Oval	Sun 5 Sep 1999	Woy Woy
2000		The Entrance	Wyong	24–10	Grand Final	No	Northpower Stadium	Sat 26 Aug 2000	Wyong
2001	8	Woy Woy	The Entrance	22–16	Grand Final	No	Northpower Stadium	Sun 2 Sep 2001	Woy Woy
2002	7	Wyong	The Entrance	22–8	Grand Final	No	Central Coast Stadium	Sun 1 Sep 2002	The Entrance
2003	8	The Entrance	Erina	42–4	Grand Final	No	CCEA Stadium	Sun 31 Aug 2003	The Entrance
2004	10	The Entrance	Umina	23–22	Grand Final	Yes	CCEA Stadium	Sun 12 Sep 2004	The Entrance
2005	10	Umina	Woy Woy	22–14	Grand Final	No	Morrie Breen Oval	Sun 18 Sep 2005	Umina
2006	12	Woy Woy	Umina	48–14	Grand Final	No	Morrie Breen Oval	Sat 30 Sep 2006	Woy Woy
2007	10	Woy Woy	Umina	31–6	Grand Final	No	Woy Woy Oval	Sun 23 Sep 2007	Umina
2008	10	The Entrance	Ourimbah	50–4	Grand Final	No	Bluetounge Stadium	Sun 21 Sep 2008	The Entrance
2009	10	The Entrance	Northern Lakes	52–14	Grand Final	No	Morrie Breen Oval	Sun 20 Sep 2009	The Entrance
2010	10	Ourimbah	Berkeley Vale	22–10	Grand Final	No	EDSACC Oval	Sat 18 Sep 2010	Ourimbah
2011	10	Berkeley Vale	Ourimbah	38–18	Grand Final	No	Morrie Breen Oval	Sat 17 Sep 2011	Ourimbah
2012	10	Kincumber	Umina	12–10	Grand Final		Morrie Breen Oval	Sat 15 Sep 2012	Terrigal
2013	12	Berkeley Vale	Erina	21–20	Grand Final		Morrie Breen Oval	Sat 21 Sep 2013	Terrigal
2014	12	Wyong	Berkeley Vale	8–6	Grand Final		Morrie Breen Oval	Sat 20 Sep 2014	Berkeley Vale
2015	12	The Entrance	Kincumber	22–14	Grand Final		Morrie Breen Oval	Sat 19 Sep 2015	The Entrance
2016	10	Wyong	Woy Woy	20–0	Grand Final	No	Woy Woy Oval	Sat 17 Sep 2016	Wyong
2017	10	Terrigal	Wyong	12–4	Grand Final	No	Woy Woy Oval	Sun 17 Sep 2017	Wyong
2018	9	The Entrance	Wyong	30–24	Grand Final	No	Woy Woy Oval	Sun 16 Sep 2018	The Entrance
2019	9	The Entrance	Wyong	16–14	Grand Final	No	Woy Woy Oval	Sun 29 Sep 2019	Wyong
2022	8	Toukley	Erina	20–10	Grand Final	No	EDSACC South	Sun 4 Sep 2022	Erina
2023	8	Toukley	Erina	8-6	Grand Final	No	Woy Woy Oval	Sun 20 Aug 2023	Toukley
2024	9	Erina	Toukley	12-6	Grand Final	No	Morry Breen Oval	Sat 14 Sep 2024	Erina

Note:

- Most competitions between 1915 and 1936 were decided without a finals series. The premiers being the team with the most points in the league, after an agreed number of rounds. In most seasons, a knock-out competition, usually open to all teams, took place after the premiership was decided.
- During 2003, 2004 and 2005, five of the clubs fielded teams in the Jim Beam Cup or the Newcastle Rugby League. Their reserves team played in this competition, referred to as "First Division", along with the top sides of the other clubs.
- The colour boxes reflected the club colours in the corresponding season. Ourimbah, Wyong, Woy Woy and The Entrance have changed colours during their history.
- Prior to Grand Finals becoming compulsory in 1956, a Grand Final was held only if the minor premier was beaten either in the semi-final or final.

See also a List of NSW Central Coast Rugby League First Grade Premiers

== Match details ==
1915 (Top Two Final)
OURIMBAH 3 defeated ERINA nil at Wyong on Saturday, August 29, 1915. Referee: G. Seabrook.

1919 (Play-Off Final)
JILLIBY 5 (J McCullagh try; HG Smith goal) defeated WYONG 3 (Buckton try) on Saturday, August 30, 1919. Referee: Jack Beattie.

1920 (Last Round Decider)
OURIMBAH 10 (Gleddon, McDonald tries; Humphreys 2 goals) defeated ERINA nil at Ourimbah on Saturday, August 15, 1920. Referee: C. Brannigan.

1928 (Play-Off Final)
WYONG SOUTH 4 (A Speers 2 goals) defeated OURIMBAH EAST 2 (Jack Nancarrow goal) at Ourimbah Sportsground on Saturday, August 25, 1928. Referee: William Pateman.

1947
WYONG 15 defeated WOY WOY 2.

1948
OURIMBAH 15 defeated THE ENTRANCE 7.

1949
OURIMBAH 7 (Bill Preston try; Noel Sharpe 2 goals) drew with THE ENTRANCE 7 (Jack Piper try; Fred Fitzsimmons 2 goals) after extra-time at Wyong on September 18, 1949. Referee: W. Hoare.
THE ENTRANCE 15 (W Fitzsimmons, Jack Piper, Fred Fitzsimmons tries; Ted Jeffries 3 goals) defeated OURIMBAH (J Crisp try; Noel Sharpe 4 goals) at Erina on Sunday, October 2, 1949. Referee: W. Hoare.

=== 1950s ===
1950
GOSFORD 11 (Bert Sharpe try and 4 goals) defeated OURIMBAH 7 (Allan Sharpe try; Bill Preston, Clancy Preston goals) at Wyong on Sunday, August 27, 1950. Referee: Fred Adam.

1951
OURIMBAH 2 (Allan Sharpe goal) drew with ERINA 2 (Lawrence Horsnell goal) at Grahame Park on Sunday, August 12, 1951.
OURIMBAH 15 (Nev Misson 2, A Sparrow tries; William Russ 3 goals) defeated ERINA 2 (Lawrence Horsnell goal). at Grahame Park on Sunday, August 19, 1951. Referee: A. Hextall.

1952 (Final)
OURIMBAH 11 (Allan Sharpe, Arre Lammi, William Russ tries; Noel Sharpe goal) defeated GOSFORD 3 (B Willis try) at Grahame Park on Sunday, August 10, 1952. Referee: W. Hoare.

1953
OURIMBAH 27 (Noel Sharpe 3, Tom Preston, B Walker tries; Noel Sharpe 4, Allan Sharpe 2 goals) defeated ERINA nil at Grahame Park on Sunday, August 30, 1953. Referee: R. Reicheart.

1954 (Final)
OURIMBAH 22 (D Pryor, Nev Missen, Noel Sharpe, Allan Sharpe tries; Noel Sharpe 5 goals) defeated THE ENTRANCE 17 (Ray Lugg, M Patterson, Dave Palmer tries; Dave Palmer 4 goals) in extra-time at Grahame Park on Sunday, August 29, 1954. Referee: A. Hextall.

1955 (Final)
OURIMBAH 11 (Eric Sladden 3 tries; Noel Sharpe goal) defeated THE ENTRANCE 7 (Tommy Brandtman try; Dave Palmer 2 goals) at Grahame Park on Sunday, September 11, 1955. Referee: Deaves.

1956
THE ENTRANCE 12 (Ray Parsons, Col Bakes tries; Dave Palmer 3 goals) defeated OURIMBAH 7 (Kev Williams try; Noel Sharpe 2 goals) at Grahame Park on Sunday, September 16, 1956.

1957
THE ENTRANCE 20 (Dave Palmer 2, Chic Ryan, Jim Sewell tries; Dave Palmer 4 goals) defeated ERINA 2 (Doug Bennett goal) on Sunday, September 1, 1957.

1958
GOSFORD 16 (P. Clayton, L. Bailey tries; M. Ward 3, W. Kirwin 2 goals) defeated THE ENTRANCE 8 (A. Foskett 4 goals) at Grahame Park on Sunday, September 14, 1958.

1959
GOSFORD (Brian Green, Ross Smith tries; L. Bloomfield goal) defeated ERINA 4 (B. Woodbury 2 goals) at The Entrance on Sunday, September 13, 1959.

=== 1960s ===
1960
OURIMBAH 24 (T. Morris 2, Don Nancarrow, Brian Eden, Allan Sharpe, K. Archbold tries; Brian Eden 2, Noel Sharpe 2 goals) defeated ERINA 12 (B. Short, Ron Nowland tries; Peter Bennett 3 goals) at Erina on Sunday, September 11, 1960.

1961
THE ENTRANCE 19 (Ron Kelk, Chic Ryan, P. Carney tries; Ray Parker 3, Col O’Donnell goals; Ron Kelk field goal) defeated OURIMBAH 10 (P. Deaves, G. Parish tries; Brian Eden 2 goals) at Grahame Park on Sunday, September 10, 1961.

1962
WOY WOY 12 (Eric Rowlands, William Morelli tries; Robert Wallace 3 goals) defeated OURIMBAH 3 (George Lammi try) at Grahame Park on Sunday, September 9, 1962.

1963
GOSFORD 6 (Gary Wilkinson 2 tries) defeated OURIMBAH 5 (Warwick Smallman try; Brian Eden goal) at Grahame Park on Sunday, September 15, 1963. Referee: Les Brookes.

1964
WOY WOY 22 defeated GOSFORD 3.

1965
GOSFORD 7 (Allan Grady try; Pat Bell 2 goals) defeated WOY WOY 2 (Eric Rowlands goal) at Sohier Park, Ourimbah on September 5, 1965. Referee: Bernie Haviland.

1966
WOY WOY 11 (Warren Kain try; Bill Bennett 4 goals) defeated ERINA 9 (A. Nowland try; Peter Bennett 3 goals) in extra-time at Sohier Park on Sunday, September 11, 1966. Referee: Bernie Haviland.

1967
WOY WOY 27 (B. Berry 2, Peter Louis, Charlie Saunders, John Monie, Warren Kain, J. Robinson tries; Bill Bennett 3 goals) defeated WYONG 7 (Jack Fernance try and 2 goals) at Grahame Park on Sunday, October 1, 1967.

1968
WYONG 20 (Allan Hicks 2, Hilton Robinson, Darryl Palmer tries; Jack Fernance 4 goals) defeated WOY WOY 2 (Mick Allen goal) at Sohier Park on Sunday, September 15, 1968. Referee: Barry Winter.

1969
WYONG 26 (Allan Hicks 3, Darryl Palmer, Anthony Quinn, Doug Gleeson tries; Jack Fernance 4 goals) defeated GOSFORD 9 (S. Mison try; R. Bray 3 goals) on Sunday, September 21, 1969.

=== 1970s ===
1970
WOY WOY 13 (Peter Louis 2, Charlie Saunders tries; Graham Eadie 2 goals) defeated WYONG 6 (Jack Fernance 2 goals; Denis Smith field goal) at Grahame Park on Sunday, September 20, 1970. Referee: Noel Fenning.

1971
WYONG 30 (Allan Hicks 2, Ken Peel, Denis Smith, Dave Irwin, Denis Atkins tries, Allan Hicks 6 goals) defeated WOY WOY 25 (William Monie, John Archibald, Laurie Wilesmith, Charlie Saunders, Jack Maloney tries; John Archibald 5 goals) at Grahame Park on Sunday, September 26, 1971. Referee: Bernie Haviland.

1972
WOY WOY 16 (Doug Coates, Peter Robertson tries; John Sullivan 5 goals) defeated THE ENTRANCE 12 (Grahame Dell, Bill Sawers tries; N. Bradney 2, Warren Wyatt goals) at Grahame Park on Sunday, September 10, 1972. Referee: Noel Davidson.

1973
GOSFORD 8 (Gary Wilkinson, Dave Trickett tries; Darryl Collins goal) defeated WYONG 4 (Ken Peel 2 goals) at Grahame Park on Sunday, September 16, 1973. Referee: B. Kirwin

1974
WYONG 14 (Les Hannah, Garry Amor tries; Les Hannah 4 goals) defeated UMINA 6 (Wayne Peterson 3 goals) at Grahame Park on Sunday, September 29, 1974.

1975
WOY WOY 17 (Noel Annand try; Paul Condren 7 goals) defeated WYONG 9 (Merrick Lindsay try; Les Hannah 3 goals) at Grahame Park on Sunday, September 21, 1975.

1976
WOY WOY 19 (Steve McKenzie, Warwick Bissaker, Paul Condren tries; Paul Condren 4, Steve McKenzie goals) defeated ERINA 7 (Bruce Fitzpatrick try; Alain Sauvage 2 goals) on Sunday, September 12, 1976. Referee: Les Ballard.

1977
ERINA 10 (Greg Smith, Mick Friend tries; Bruce Fitzpatrick 2 goals) defeated WYONG 7 (Andy Whitbourne try; Les Hannah 2 goals) at Grahame Park on Sunday, September 18, 1977.

1978
GOSFORD 23 (Mick Friend, Grant Cook, John Loveday, Trevor Hoare tries; Ron Gibbs 5 goals) defeated WOY WOY 20 (Frank Edwards 2, Brad Murray, Glen Crompton tries; Greg Hillard 4 goals) on Sunday, September 17, 1978.

1979
WOY WOY 29 (Frank Edwards 2, Greg Hillard, Garry Nissen, Steve McKenzie, Dennis Corrigan tries; Greg Hillard 5 goals) defeated WYONG 7 (David Irwin try; Les Hannah 2 goals) at Grahame Park on Sunday, September 16, 1979.

=== 1980s ===
1980
WOY WOY 19 (Steven Heath 2, Bill Monie, Dennis Corrigan, Gary Nissen tries; Greg Hillard 2 goals) defeated UMINA 6 (Mick Liubinskas, Allan Rhoades tries) at Grahame Park on Sunday, September 14, 1980. Referee: Bruce Shipton.

1981
ERINA 27 (Bill Monie 2, Paul Mellross, Tony Ashworth, Craig McNee tries; 6 goals) defeated WYONG 7 (Mick Fawcett try; 2 goals) at Grahame Park on Sunday, September 13, 1981.

1982
WYONG 28 (Brian Ferguson 2, Paul Taylor, Barry Sohier, Rob Wellsmore tries; Alan Cheal 6 goals; Geoff Greentree field goal) defeated WOY WOY 10 (Steve Heath, Glen Pollinelli tries; Greg Hillard 2 goals) at Grahame Park on Sunday, September 19, 1982. Referee: Bob Saunders.

1983
GOSFORD 10 (Shayne Rawling try; Noel Annand 3 goals) drew with UMINA 10 (Mick Finnigan, Shane Slattery tries; John MacArthur goal) after extra-time at Grahame Park on Sunday, September 18, 1982. Referee: Jim Wood.

UMINA 26 (Jamie Thompson, Graham Penboss, Gary Lewis, Sam Ferraro tries; John MacArthur 5 goals) defeated GOSFORD 10 (Anthony Clarke; Noel Annand 3 goals) in extra-time at Grahame Park on Sunday, September 25, 1982. Referee: Jim Wood.

1984
WOY WOY 14 (Steve Heath 2, Rick Potts tries; Greg Hillard goal) defeated UMINA 6 (Col Wright try; Colin Wormleaton goal) at Grahame Park on Sunday, September 16, 1984. Referee: Robert Saunders.

1985
WOY WOY 28 (Jerry Psaltis 2, Robert Sainty, Darren Nielsen tries; Tony Jarvis 6 goals) defeated UMINA 6 (Graham Nicoll try; Paul Stanimeros goal) at Grahame Park on Sunday, September 15, 1985. Referee: John Wells.

1986
TERRIGAL-WAMBERAL 16 (Matt Skinner, Colin Wormleaton, Steve McCoy tries; Keith Cook 2 goals) defeated WOY WOY 12 (Mark Besley, Stephen Hall tries; Bob Sainty 2 goals) at Grahame Park on Sunday, September 7, 1986.

1987
WOY WOY 28 (Stewart Galvin 2 tries, Mark Miller, Mark Long, Bob Sainty tries; Mark Jones 4 goals) defeated WYONG 12 (Geoff Todd, Shane Kuhn tries; two goals) at Grahame Park on Sunday, September 6, 1987. Referee: Bob Saunders.

1988
ERINA 12 (Pater Davis, Gary Jones tries; Brian Taylor 2 goals) defeated WYONG 8 (Ian Naden, Bob Mules tries) at Grahame Park on Sunday, September 18, 1988. Referee: Bob Saunders.

1989
THE ENTRANCE 18 (Pat Hart 3 tries; Jason New 3 goals) defeated WYONG 8 (Garry Deaker try; Errol Mehmet 2 goals) at Grahame Park on Sunday, September 10, 1989. Referee: Bob Saunders.

=== 1990s ===
1990
WYONG 8 (David Perry try; Errol Mehmet 2 goals) defeated ERINA 6 (Dave Kenny try; unnamed goal) at Grahame Park on Sunday, September 9, 1990. Referee: K. Menchin.

1991
ERINA 30 (Warren Douce, Michael Clements, Brett Jackson, Greg Clements, and one other tries; George Cooke 4 goals, one other goal) defeated WOY WOY 8 (One try; John Muggleton goal; one other goal) at Grahame Park on Sunday, September 1, 1991. Referee: Tom Gustard.

1992
WYONG 16 (Wayne Lambkin, David Perry tries; Errol Mehmet 4 goals) defeated ERINA 14 (Michael Clements, Jussi Tillikka tries; Warren Douche 3 goals) at Grahame Park on Sunday, September 13, 1992. Referee: Jim Woods.

1993
THE ENTRANCE 23 (Shane Hawes 2, Sean Gale, Pat Hart tries; Shane Hawes 3 goals; Justin Kidd field goal) defeated WYONG 12 (Tony Gleeson, Richard Phillips tries; Errol Mehmet 2 goals) at Grahame Park at Grahame Park on Sunday, September 5, 1993. Referee: Kelvin Menchin.

1994
UMINA 32 (Adam O’Neill 2, Stewart Galvin 2, Nathan Grey, Scott Murray tries; three unnamed goals; Tony Peters, Scott Murray field goals) defeated WYONG 24 (Len Bevan, Jamie Lovett, Dave Barrett, Dean Amos tries; Mark Breceljnik at least one of four goals) at Grahame Park on Sunday, September 4, 1994. Referee: Kelvin Menchin.

1995
THE ENTRANCE 8 (Pat Hart try; Brian Rees 2 goals) defeated WYONG (Len Bevan try) at Grahame Park on Sunday, September 3, 1995. Referee: Kelvin Menchin.

1996
WYONG 13 (Mark Rudd try; Lindsay Bowne 4 goals; Mark Breceljnik field goal) defeated THE ENTRANCE 6 (Steve McSweeney try; unnamed goal) at Grahame Park on Sunday, September 1, 1996.

1997
WYONG 32(John MacArthur 2, Mark Rudd, Matt Harris, Adam Couzens, Dave Lawton tries; Mark Breceljnik 4 goals) defeated GOSFORD 6 (David King try; goal) at Grahame Park on Sunday, September 7, 1997. Referee: Dave Allen.

1998
WOY WOY 16 (Dave Maryska 2, Danny Mamo, tries; Dave Maryska 2 goals) defeated ERINA 6 (Craig Ashton try; Stephen Davis goal) at Grahame Park on Sunday, August 30, 1998. Referee: Michael Guilbert.

1999
WOY WOY 28 (Shane Ward 2, Duncan Smith, Dave Maryska tries; Dave Maryska 6 goals) defeated WYONG 26 (Mark Rudd, Chris Crotty, Matt Harris, Kevin Turkington, Anthony Fenton tries; Mark Breceljnik 3 goals) at Woy Woy Oval on Sunday, September 5, 1999. Referee: Ray Windle

=== 2000s ===
2000
THE ENTRANCE 24 (Chris O’Beirne and others tries; goals) defeated WYONG 10 (Josh White and another tries; goal) at Northpower Stadium, Grahame Park on Saturday, August 26, 2000.

2001
WOY WOY 22 (Grant Stuart, Brett Byrne, Elton Connors, Layne Martin tries; Elton Connors, Dave Maryska two of three goals) defeated THE ENTRANCE 16 (John Strange, Ryan Wheele, Steve Ekepati tries; two goals) at Northpower Stadium, Grahame Park on Sunday, September 2, 2001.

2002
WYONG 22 (Matt Ross, Rod Bird and others tries; goals) defeated THE ENTRANCE 8 at Central Coast Stadium, Grahame Park on Sunday, September 1, 2002. Referee: Peter Betts.

2003
THE ENTRANCE 42 (Brian Rees 3, Matt Siedlecki and others tries; Nathan Thomas 5 goals) defeated ERINA 4 at Central Coast Express Advocate Stadium, Grahame Park on Sunday, August 31, 2003.

2004
THE ENTRANCE 23 (Grant Condon 2, C. Mundey, Dane Lear tries; Nathan Thomas 2, Steve Stringer goals; Dane Allen field goal) defeated UMINA 22 (Adam Love 3, Todd Maloney, Michael Romeo tries; Adam Love goal) in extra time at Central Coast Express Advocate Stadium, Grahame Park on Sunday, September 12, 2004.

2005
UMINA BEACH 22 (Todd Maloney 2, Ben Milby, John Hickey, Dave Murray tries; Shane O'Sullivan goal) defeated WOY WOY 14 (Aaron Hamstra, Chris Barry tries; Chris McKenzie 3 goals) at Morrie Breen Oval, Kanwal on Sunday, September 18, 2005.

2006
WOY WOY 48 (D. King 2, D. Hyde, Adam King, T. McLellan, J. McLaren, Shane Wilson, M. Silvia tries; T. McLellan 5, Jade Mason 1 goals) defeated UMINA BEACH 14 (M. Fawcett, P. Murray, Mitchell Finnigan tries; M. Fawcett goal) at Morrie Breen Oval, Kanwal on Saturday, September 30, 2006.

2007
WOY WOY 31 (A. Bull 2, D. King, J. Jackson, Kyall Walford, B. Rees tries; B. Rees 3 goals; Kyall Walford field goal) defeated UMINA BEACH 6 (Tim Bovis try; Shane O'Sullivan goal) at Woy Woy Oval on Sunday, September 23, 2007.

2008
THE ENTRANCE 50 (Jamen McLeod 2, Kirk Thompson 2, Jason Cook, Ryan Kelly, Ben O'Connell, Dane Allen, Brian Tritton tries; Steve Stringer 6, Jamen McLeod goals) defeated OURIMBAH 4 (Mark Brown try) at Bluetounge Stadium, Grahame Park on Sunday, September 21, 2008.

2009
THE ENTRANCE 52 (Alex Moore 5, Jay Heming, Ryan Kelly, Ben O'Connell, S. Wooden tries; Matthew Nelson 8 goals) defeated NORTHERN LAKES 14 (Benjamin Perkins, Grant Faatoia-Collins, C. Goldie tries; Clinton Allsop goal) at Morrie Breen Oval, Kanwal on Sunday, September 20, 2009.

=== 2010s ===
2010
OURIMBAH 22 (Noel McLean, Mark Littlefield, Chris Morgan, Jason Thorne tries; Jason Thorne 3 goals) defeated BERKELEY VALE 10 (Steve Lyons, Dane Allen tries; Dane Allen goal) on Saturday, September 18, 2010.

2011
BERKELEY VALE 38 (Jamel Afoa 2, Daniel York 2, B. Holden, Lincoln Tubridy, Nathan Simpson tries; D. Kelly 5 goals) defeated OURIMBAH 18 (Alexander Lash, Jason Thorne, Taylor Mildren tries; David McLean 2, Jason Thorne goal) at Morrie Breen Oval, Kanwal on Saturday, September 17, 2011.

2012
KINCUMBER 12 (Blake Wagner, Ryan Cribb tries; Matthew Nelson 2 goals) defeated UMINA BEACH 10 (Chad Walsh, Luke McDonald tries; Ben Brooks goal) at Morrie Breen Oval on Saturday, September 15, 2012.

2013
BERKELEY VALE 21 (Brett MacDonald 2 tries, Robert Tandy, Joel Eastment tries; Brett MacDonald 2 goals; Ben Fitzsimmons field goal) defeated ERINA (Brayden Cain, Jamie Feeney, Brice Roberts, Dayn Marson tries; Brayden Cain goals) at Morrie Breen Oval on Saturday, September 21, 2013.

2014
WYONG 8 (Luke Sharpe try; Blake Carter, Brent Murray goals) defeated BERKELEY VALE 6 (Alex Moore try; Ryan Drew goal) at Morrie Breen Oval on Saturday, September 20, 2014.

2015
THE ENTRANCE 22 (Grant Nelson 2, Timothy Nawaqatabu, Shaune Corrigan tries; Adam McInnes 3 goals) defeated KINCUMBER 14 Troy Woodley, James Duchatel tries; Brayden Cain 3 goals) at Morrie Breen Oval on Saturday, September 19, 2015.

2016
WYONG 20 (Blake Carter, Nick O'Meley, Mitch Nakhoul, Nick Lynn tries; Brad Keighran 2 goals) defeated WOY WOY nil at Woy Woy Oval on Saturday, September 17, 2016.

== Sources ==
- Digitised newspapers at the National Library of Australia's Trove website

- Gosford Times and Wyong District Advocate
- The Newcastle Herald

- Microfilm of the following newspapers are available at the State Library of New South Wales and Central Coast Council libraries at Gosford and Wyong. The RAV numbers provided are those used by the State Library.

- Gosford Times (RAV 24 - Reels #1, 1897-1900; #31 to #40, 1955 to 1962)
- Central Coast Express (RAV 61)
- The Guardian (The Entrance and Wyong) (RAV 63 - Reels #1 and #2, 1933-1959 miscellaneous)
- Wyong and Lakes District Advocate (RAV 178 - Reel #2, 1932-1956 miscellaneous)

- The magazine Rugby League Week. Available in a text-only format / version through the State Library of New South Wales website - eResources - Journals.
- Erina Rugby League Football Club
- Woy Woy Roosters
- Fox Sports Pulse
- The following books are available at the Tuggerah Branch of the Central Coast Council Libraries

- George Glading (1995). History of Wyong Rugby League 1893-1995. Kanwal, New South Wales: Wyong Rugby League Club Limited. ISBN 0-646-25613-0.
- A History of The Entrance Rugby League Football Club - From Seagulls to Tigers 1934 to 2012. Bateau Bay, New South Wales: The Entrance Rugby League Football Club. 2013.
