= NSW Central Coast Rugby League under-19 grand finals =

Australian rugby league competition

This article provides information on the under 19 premiership deciders of rugby league competitions held on the Central Coast of New South Wales, Australia. The match details sub-section details the individual point-scorers in a match, where known.

The current competition is conducted under the auspices of the Central Coast Division Rugby League, an affiliate of NSW Country Rugby League and the New South Wales Rugby League.

A predecessor to Under 18 and Under 19 competitions was C Grade, which was held from the late 1940s to 1966. When Group status was obtained in 1967, C and D Grade became Under 19 and Under 17. The following year they were changed to Under 18 and Under 16. Between 1979 and 1982 the two competitions reverted to Under 19 and Under 17. In 2000, Third Grade and Under 18s were replaced by Under 19 and Under 17 competitions. There has been an Under 19 competition in each subsequent season, apart from 2012 (two Under 18 divisions) and 2013 (Under 18 and Under 17).

== List ==
Under 19 Grand Finals
Season	Teams	Premiers	Runners-up	Score	Match type	Extra time	Venue	Date	Minor premiers
1967	6	Wyong	Woy Woy	25–3	Grand Final		Grahame Park	Sun 1 Oct 1967	
1979	9	Erina	Wyong	21–18	Grand Final	No	Grahame Park	Sun 16 Sep 1979	Wyong
1980	9	The Entrance	Wyong	14–8	Grand Final	No	Grahame Park	Sun 14 Sep 1980	Wyong
1981	8	Wyong	Woy Woy	11–5	Grand Final	No	Grahame Park	Sun 13 Sep 1981	
1982	10	Umina	Woy Woy	14–10	Grand Final	No	Grahame Park	Sun 19 Sep 1982	Woy Woy
2000	7	Wyong	Ourimbah	27–18	Grand Final	No	Northpower Stadium	Sat 26 Aug 2000	
2001	8	Woy Woy	Wyong	22–20	Grand Final	No	Northpower Stadium	Sun 2 Sep 2001	Woy Woy
2002	7	Wyong	The Entrance	31–26	Grand Final	Yes	Central Coast Stadium	Sun 1 Sep 2002	Wyong
2003	8	Ourimbah	The Entrance	24–20	Grand Final	No	CCEA Stadium	Sun 31 Aug 2003	Wyong
2004	11	Erina	Terrigal	34–8	Grand Final		CCEA Stadium	Sun 12 Sep 2004	Terrigal
2005	11	Ourimbah	Kincumber	14–6	Grand Final		Morrie Breen Oval	Sun 18 Sep 2005	Erina
2006	11	Terrigal	The Entrance	22–16	Grand Final		Morrie Breen Oval	Sat 30 Sep 2006	The Entrance
2007	9	Erina	Umina	24–16	Grand Final		Woy Woy Oval	Sun 23 Sep 2007	Umina
2008	11	The Entrance	Umina	34–16	Grand Final		Bluetounge Stadium	Sun 21 Sep 2008	Umina
2010	10	The Entrance	Terrigal	18–8	Grand Final		EDSACC Oval	Sat 18 Sep 2010	The Entrance
2011	10	Terrigal	The Entrance	23–6	Grand Final		Morrie Breen Oval	Sat 17 Sep 2011	
2014	8	Wyong	The Entrance	32–12	Grand Final		Morrie Breen Oval	Sat 20 Sep 2014	Wyong
2015	8	Terrigal	Kincumber	24–20	Grand Final		Morrie Breen Oval	Sat 19 Sep 2015	Kincumber
2016	7	Wyong	Woy Woy	24–22	Grand Final	No	Woy Woy Oval	Sat 17 Sep 2016	Woy Woy
2017	8	Berkeley Vale	Terrigal	22–10	Grand Final	No	Woy Woy Oval	Sun 17 Sep 2017	Terrigal

== Match details ==
1967
WYONG 25 (Ray Morris, Rod Wicks, Anthony Quinn, Dave Irwin, Gary Sonter tries; Anthony Quinn 5 goals) defeated WOY WOY 3 (Col Chaffey try). Referee: Noel Davidson.

=== 1979–81 ===
1979
ERINA 21 (Peter Steuerwald 2, John Ulherr, Peter Wilson, George Cook tries; George Cook 3 goals) defeated WYONG 18 (David Lindsay, Ken Newbury, Frank Brajhli tries; Ian Thompson 3 goals) at Grahame Park on Sunday, September 16, 1979.

1980
THE ENTRANCE 14 (Peter Shearman, Sean Plunkett tries; Brian Walker 3, Warren Pritchard goals) defeated WYONG 8 (Steven Marks, G. Jones tries; I. Thompson goal) at Grahame Park on Sunday, September 14, 1980. Referee: J. Jacobsen.

1981
WYONG 11 (Errol Mehmet 2, Phil Langley tries; unnamed goal) defeated WOY WOY 5 (try; goal) at Grahame Park on Sunday, September 13, 1981.

1982
UMINA 14 (Michael Mullins, Brett O’Sullivan, Robert Groves tries; J. McArthur 2 goals; Darren Guest field goal) defeated WOY WOY 10 (Scott Molloy, Steve Coffey tries; Bernie Whalan 2 goals) at Grahame Park on Sunday, September 19, 1982. Referee: J. Wood.

=== 2000s ===
2000
WYONG 27 defeated OURIMBAH 18 at NorthPower Stadium, Grahame Park on Saturday, August 26, 2000.

2001
WOY WOY 22 (Troy McLennan 2, Lee Browne, Craig Rodgers, Shannon Stuart tries; goal) defeated WYONG 20 at NorthPower Stadium, Grahame Park on Sunday, September 2, 2001.

2002
WYONG 31 (Aaron Hollingsworth and others tries; goals; Chris Bigeni field goal) defeated THE ENTRANCE 26 in extra-time at Central Coast Stadium, Grahame Park on Sunday, September 1, 2002.

2003
OURIMBAH 34 defeated THE ENTRANCE 20 at Central Coast Express Advocate Stadium, Grahame Park on Sunday, August 31, 2003.

2004
ERINA 34 defeated TERRIGAL 8 at Central Coast Express Advocate Stadium, Grahame Park on Sunday September 12, 2004.

2005
OURIMBAH 14 defeated KINCUMBER 6 at Morrie Breen on Sunday, September 18, 2005.

2006
TERRIGAL 22 (S. Haywood 2, S. Sullivan, R. Folkard tries; D. Moltzen 3 goals) defeated THE ENTRANCE 16 (S. Corrigan, K. Thompson, B. O'Connell tries; K. Thompson 2 goals) at Morrie Breen on Saturday, September 30, 2006.

2007
ERINA 24 defeated UMINA 16 at Woy Woy Oval on Sunday, September 23, 2007.

2008
THE ENTRANCE 34 defeated UMINA 16 at Bluetounge Stadium on Sunday, September 21, 2008.

=== 2010s ===
2010
THE ENTRANCE 18 defeated TERRIGAL 8 on Saturday, September 18, 2010.

2011
TERRIGAL 23 defeated THE ENTRANCE 6 on Saturday, September 17, 2011.

2014
WYONG 32 (Kairo Anderson 3, Adam Keighran, Jacob Liddle, Dean Coughlan, Mitchell Riley tries; Luke Sharpe 2 goals) defeated THE ENTRANCE 12 (Sean Boyton, Brodyn Mills tries; Ryan Doherty 2 goals) at Morrie Breen on Saturday, September 20, 2014.

2015
TERRIGAL 24 (Scott Drinkwater 2, Mitchell Laver, Matthew Langhein tries; Josh Cook 3, Zac Attwood goals) defeated KINCUMBER 20 (Blake Wylie, Joshua Richardson, Mitchell Shoults, Bryce Davey tries; Blake Wylie 2 goals) at Morrie Breen on Saturday, September 19, 2015.

2016
WYONG 24 (McCoy White 2, Aaron Heaven, Kye Martin tries; Jesse Stephen 4 goals) defeated WOY WOY 22 (Guy Pearson, Loughie Kirwan, Darnell Wisham, Nathan Bawden tries; Max Jolley 3 goals) at Woy Woy Oval on Saturday, September 17, 2016.

== Sources ==
- Microfilm of the following newspapers are available at the State Library of New South Wales and Central Coast Council libraries at Gosford and Wyong. The RAV numbers provided are those used by the State Library.

- Central Coast Express (RAV 61)
- Wyong and Lakes District Advocate (RAV 178)
- Wyong Shire Advocate (RAV 824)

- Erina Rugby League Football Club
- Woy Woy Roosters
- Fox Sports Pulse
- The following books are available at the Tuggerah Branch of the Central Coast Council Libraries

- George Glading (1995). History of Wyong Rugby League 1893-1995. Kanwal, New South Wales: Wyong Rugby League Club Limited. ISBN 0-646-25613-0.
- A History of The Entrance Rugby League Football Club - From Seagulls to Tigers 1934 to 2012. Bateau Bay, New South Wales: The Entrance Rugby League Football Club. 2013.
