= NSW Central Coast Rugby League under-16 grand finals =

This article provides information on the under-16 premiership deciders of rugby league competitions held on the Central Coast of New South Wales, Australia. The match details sub-section details the individual point-scorers in a match, where known. In 1996 and all but one season since 2003, a second tier under-16 competition has also been held.

The current competition is conducted under the auspices of the Central Coast Division Junior Rugby League, an affiliate of NSW Country Rugby League and the New South Wales Rugby League.

A predecessor to the under-16 competition was D Grade, which was held from 1955 to 1966. When Group status was obtained in 1967, C and D Grade became under 19 and under 17. This was changed again the following year, 1968, to under 18 and under 16.

The junior body, or association, switched from weight-based divisions to age-based divisions in 1971, with under 15 the oldest.

In 1979, the youth competitions reverted to being under 19 and under 17. This changed again in 1983. The under-18 competition remained under the control of the senior body and continued to be played on Sundays prior to grade matches. The junior association took on the under-16 competition, with matches played on Saturdays.

== Division 1 ==
Under-16 grand finals
Season	Teams	Premiers	Runners-up	Score	Match type	Extra time	Venue	Date	Minor premiers
1968	7	Wyong	Erina	8–3	Grand final	No	Sohier Park	Sun 15 Sep 1968	Erina
1969	7	Woy Woy	Gosford	13–5	Grand final	No	Sohier Park	Sun 21 Sep 1969	Woy Woy
1970	7	Wyong	Gosford	14–9	Grand final	No	Graeme Park	Sun 20 Sep 1970	Wyong
1971	6	Gosford	Wyong	32–0	Grand final	No	Graeme Park	Sun 26 Sep 1971	
1972	6	Ourimbah	The Entrance	14–11	Grand final	No	Graeme Park	Sun 10 Sep 1972	The Entrance
1973	7	Woy Woy	Erina	9–6	Grand final	Yes	Graeme Park	Sun 16 Sep 1973	Wyong
1974	7	The Entrance	Erina	4–3	Grand final	No	Graeme Park	Sun 29 Sep 1974	The Entrance
1975	5			-	Grand final		Graeme Park	Sun 21 Sep 1975	Woy Woy
1976	7	Gosford	Wyong	12–10	Grand final	No	Graeme Park	Sun 12 Sep 1976	Gosford
1977	7	Wyong	Erina	13–5	Grand final	No	Graeme Park	Sun 18 Sep 1977	Wyong
1978	8	Erina	Wyong	13–6	Grand final	No	Graeme Park	Sun 17 Sep 1978	Erina
1983	7	Woy Woy	Toukley	9–6	Grand final		Graeme Park	Sat 27 Aug 1983	
1984		Wyong	The Entrance	12–4	Grand final	No	Graeme Park	Sat 25 Aug 1984	
1985	7	Terrigal	Toukley	16–12	Grand final	No	Graeme Park	Sat 24 Aug 1985	Ourimbah
1986	8	Wyong	Gosford	30–0	Grand final	No	Graeme Park	Sat 23 Aug 1986	Wyong
1987	8	Woy Woy	Toukley	10–4	Grand final		Graeme Park	Sat 29 Aug 1987	Wyong
1988	11	Gosford	St Edwards	18–8	Grand final		Graeme Park	Sat 27 Aug 1988	Gosford
1989	10	Woy Woy	Wyong	16–6	Grand final	No	Graeme Park	Sat 26 Aug 1989	The Entrance
1990	8	Erina	Ourimbah	8–6	Grand final	No	Graeme Park	Sat 25 Aug 1990	Erina
1991	10	Munmorah	Umina	22–12	Grand final	Yes	Graeme Park	Sat 31 Aug 1991	Mummorah
1992	12	Terrigal	Berkeley Vale	13–10	Grand final		Graeme Park	Sat 5 Sep 1992	Terrigal
1993	9	Terrigal	Wyong	20–12	Grand final	No	Graeme Park	Sat 4 Sep 1993	
1994	9	St Edwards	The Entrance	22–10	Grand final		Morrie Breen Oval (Wyong RLC)	Sat 3 Sep 1994	The Entrance
1995	9	The Entrance	St Edwards	16–14	Grand final	No	Graeme Park	Sat 2 Sep 1995	Woy Woy
1996	8	Wyong	The Entrance	28–12	Grand final		Graeme Park	Sat 24 Aug 1996	Wyong
1997	10	St Edwards	Woy Woy	8–4	Grand final		Graeme Park	Sat 6 Sep 1997	St Edwards
1998	10	Wyong	Umina	20–12	Grand final		Graeme Park	Sat 12 Sep 1998	
1999	12	Kincumber	Wyong	12–10	Grand final		Woy Woy Oval	Sun 12 Sep 1999	
2000	10	The Entrance	Umina	36–0	Grand final		Industree Group Stadium	Sat 19 Aug 2000	
2001	10	Kincumber	Wyong	18–12	Grand final		Industree Group Stadium	Sat 15 Sep 2001	
2002	10	Wyong		24–20	Grand final		Industree Group Stadium	Sat 7 Sep 2002	
2003		Erina	Berkeley Vale	27–20	Grand final		Industree Group Stadium	Sat 30 Aug 2003	
2004	8	The Entrance	Terrigal	14–12	Grand final		Industree Group Stadium	4 or 5 Sep 2004	
2005	9	Kincumber White	Toukley	36–14	Grand final		Industree Group Stadium	Sun 11 Sep 2005	
2006	10	The Entrance	Kincumber White	11–10	Grand final			Sat 16 Sep 2006	
2007	11	Berkeley Vale	Wyong	34–10	Grand final		Woy Woy Oval	Sat 15 Sep 2007	
2008	4	Terrigal	Wyong	24–18	Grand final			6 or 7 Sep 2008	
2009	7	Wyong		24–18	Grand final		Industree Group Stadium	Sun 13 Sep 2009	Wyong
2010	9	Wyong	Terrigal	16–12	Grand final	Yes	Industree Group Stadium	Sun 12 Sep 2010	
2011		Kincumber	Wyong Green	24–10	Grand final		Industree Group Stadium	Sun 18 Sep 2011	
2012	4	Wyong	Ourimbah	16–10	Grand final		Industree Group Stadium	Sun 9 Sep 2012	Wyong
2013	16	Toukley Blue	Woy Woy Red	32–6	Grand final		Industree Group Stadium	Sun 15 Sep 2013	Woy Woy Red
2014	9	Kincumber	Toukley	26–18	Grand final		Morrie Breen Oval (Wyong RLC)	Sun 14 Sep 2014	Kincumber
2015	8	The Entrance	Wyong	40–6	Grand final		Industree Group Stadium	Sun 13 Sep 2015	The Entrance
2016	8	Erina	Wyong	28–18	Grand final	No	Industree Group Stadium	Sun 11 Sep 2016	Wyong
2020	5	The Entrance	Erina-Ourimbah-Wyoming	24–6	Grand final		Industree Group Stadium	Sun 11 Oct 2020	
2022	6	The Entrance	Terrigal-Wamberal	20–18	Grand final		Industree Group Stadium	Sun 28 Aug 2022	

=== Match details ===
1968
WYONG 8 (Glen Vigor, Paul Merrick tries; David Drady goal) defeated ERINA 3 (Graeme Quill try) at Sohier Park on Sunday, September 15, 1968.

1969
WOY WOY 13 (Terry Roberts 2, Peter Hall tries; Graeme Eadie 2 goals) defeated GOSFORD 5 (Andrew Carlin try; Anthony Callaghan goal) on Sunday, September 21, 1969. Referee: Bill Kirwin.

==== 1970s ====
1970
WYONG 14 (Chris Williams, Phil Jurd, Frank Sturgess, Ian Nelson tries; Col Peel goal) defeated GOSFORD 9 (L. Bourke try; Neil Jones 3 goals) at Graeme Park on Sunday, September 20, 1970.

1971
GOSFORD 32 (Andrew Carlin 2, Mick Friend 2, Andrew Babekhul, Barry Weinert, Malcolm Brown, P. Needham tries; John Rankin, Barry Weinert 3 goals) defeated WYONG nil at Graeme Park on Sunday, September 26, 1971.

1972
OURIMBAH 14 (Peter Wilkins, Gary Sharpe, J. Maher tries; Mark Austin 2 goals and field goal) defeated THE ENTRANCE 11 (Jim Harvey 2, Peter Bean tries; Ken Hey goal) at Graeme Park on Sunday, September 10, 1972.

1973
WOY WOY 9 (Ken Johnson 2, Harry Wheeler tries) defeated ERINA 6 (Greg Smith, Bill Wassens tries) in extra-time at Graeme Park on Sunday, September 16, 1973.

1974
THE ENTRANCE 4 (W. Kinsella try; unnamed field goal) defeated ERINA 3 (M. Hourigan try) at Graeme Park on Sunday, September 29, 1974.

1975
The Grand final was held at Graeme Park on Sunday, September 21, 1975. Erina and The Entrance were the competing teams. The result was not published in the Wyong Advocate and just one issue, Wednesday, September 23, of the then daily Central Coast Express survives on microfilm. Consequently, the result is unknown to the author.

1976
GOSFORD 12 (Alan Cochran, B. Lynch tries; Rodney Austine 3 goals) defeated WYONG 10 (Jeff Morton, Graeme Cheal tries; Graeme Cheal 2 goals) on Sunday, September 12, 1976.

1977
WYONG 13 (Tony Murray, Alan Cole, Brian Newman tries; Ian Thompson 2 goals) defeated ERINA 5 (Chris Bradbury try; B. Hickey goal) at Graeme Park on Sunday, September 18, 1977.

1978
ERINA 13 (Max Wilkie, Paul Edwards, Glen Ritchie tries; Max Wilkie 2 goals) defeated WYONG 6 (Stephen Baker, Dennis Rose tries) at Graeme Park on Sunday, September 17, 1978.

==== 1980s ====
1983
WOY WOY 9 (Marc Matthews, Greg Melnik tries; Ken Fuller field goal) defeated TOUKLEY 6 (Darren Georgeston try; Richard Raymond goal) at Graeme Park on Saturday, August 27, 1983.

1984
WYONG 12 (two tries) defeated THE ENTRANCE 4 (one try) at Graeme Park on Saturday, August 25, 1984.

1985
TERRIGAL 16 (D. Bissaker 2, G. Bezrouchko tries; Billy Felton 2 goals) defeated TOUKLEY 12 (Matthew Thorne, S. Sbrugnera tries; B. Dixon 2 goals) at Graeme Park on August 24, 1985. Referee: B. Saunders.

1986
WYONG 30 (P. Sternbeck, Steven Carter, F. Brooks, Adam Aiken, Darren Akhurst, P. Maish tries; M. Hayes 2, P. Hughes goals) defeated GOSFORD nil at Graeme Park on Saturday, August 23, 1986. Referee: R. Saunders.

1987
WOY WOY 10 (D. Waterson, M. Winspear tries; A. Campbell goal) defeated TOUKLEY 4 (J. Biddle try) at Graeme Park on Saturday, August 29, 1987. Referee: B. Saunders.

1988
GOSFORD 18 (Shane Nelson 2, Kim Dawes, Troy Herbert tries; Troy Kent goal) defeated SAINT EDWARDS 8 (Andrew Burg, Julian Banningham tries) at Graeme Park on Saturday, August 27, 1988. Referee: B. Saunders.

1989
WOY WOY 16 (Jason Pilling, Danny Williams, Warren Staunton tries; Craig Makepeace 2 goals) defeated WYONG 6 (Mark Holstein try; Brett Vanagas goal) at Graeme Park on Saturday, August 26, 1989. Referee: B. Saunders.

==== 1990s ====
1990
ERINA 8 (Brett McKay, Matthew Geercke tries) defeated OURIMBAH 6 (Chris James try; Graeme Wilson goal) at Graeme Park on Saturday, August 25, 1990. Referee: B. Saunders.

1991
MUNMORAH 22 (D. Lewis 2, Mark Ivers, C. Patt tries; D. Lewis, S. Barwick goals) defeated UMINA 12 (B. Dugram, A. Bugden tries; S. Duffies 2 goals) in extra-time at Graeme Park on Saturday, August 31, 1991. Referee: R. Saunders.

1992
TERRIGAL-WAMBERAL 13 (Phil Coles, Glenn Morrison tries; Kelvin McDonald 2 goals; Glenn Morrison field goal) defeated BERKELEY VALE 10 (Michael Stewart, David Hourigan tries; Paul Stringer goals) at Graeme Park on Saturday, September 5, 1992. Referee: K. Menchin.

1993
TERRIGAL-WAMBERAL 20 (Michael Erickson, Matt Hunter, Shannon Hunter tries; Blake Mulherron 4 goals) defeated WYONG 12 (Dean Amos 2 tries; Dean Amos 2 goals) at Graeme Park on Saturday, September 4, 1993. Referee: R. Saunders.

1996
WYONG 28 (Michael Black 2, Gavin Fardy 2, Alex Starrett 2 tries; Lance Lloyd 2 goals) defeated THE ENTRANCE 12 (Gavin Westwood, Ryan O’Hara tries; Ryan O’Hara 2 goals) at Graeme Park on Saturday, August 24, 1996.

1997
ST EDWARDS 8 (Lee Brown try; Simon Thom 2 goals) defeated WOY WOY 4 (Daniel Biernat try) at Graeme Park on Saturday, September 6, 1997.

1998
WYONG 20 defeated UMINA 12 at Graeme Park on Saturday, September 12, 1998.

1999
KINCUMBER 12 defeated WYONG 10 on Sunday, September 12, 1999.

==== 2000s ====
2000
THE ENTRANCE 36 defeated UMINA nil at North Power Stadium, Graeme Park on Saturday, August 19, 2000.

2001
KINCUMBER 18 defeated WYONG 12 on September 15, 2001.

2002 WYONG 24 (Chris Cole 2, Raiff Lawson, Grant Millington Tries Chris Cole 4/4 Goals defeated ST EDW/OURIMBAH 20 James Maloney, David Sainty, Chris Trembath, Aiden Kirk tries James Maloney 2/4 Goals at Central Coast Express Advocate Stadium

2003
ERINA 27 (Blake Laybutt 3 and others tries) defeated BERKELEY VALE 20 at Central Coast Express Advocate Stadium, Graeme Park on Saturday, August 30, 2003.

2004
THE ENTRANCE 14 defeated TERRIGAL 12 at Central Coast Express Advocate Stadium, Graeme Park in September, 2004.

2005
KINCUMBER WHITE 36 (Mitchell Griffin 3 and others tries) defeated TOUKLEY 14 at Industree Group Stadium on September 11, 2005.

2006
THE ENTRANCE 11 defeated KINCUMBER WHITE 10 on Saturday, September 16, 2006.

2007
BERKELEY VALE 34 defeated WYONG 10 at Woy Woy Oval on Saturday, September 15, 2007.

2008
TERRIGAL 24 defeated WYONG 18 on September 6 or 7, 2008.

2009
WYONG 24 defeated TERRIGAL 18 at Bluetongue Stadium, Graeme Park on Sunday, September 13, 2009.

==== 2010s ====
2010
WYONG 16 defeated TERRIGAL-WAMBERAL 12 at Bluetongue Stadium, Graeme Park on Sunday, September 12, 2010.

2011
KINCUMBER 24 defeated WYONG GREEN 10 at Bluetongue Stadium, Graeme Park on Sunday, September 18, 2011.

2012
WYONG 16 defeated OURIMBAH 10 at Bluetongue Stadium, Graeme Park on Sunday, September 9, 2012.

2013
TOUKLEY BLUE 32 (Adam Keighran 2 tries, Luke Gearside Brock Taylor, Jakob Giles, Cameron Catania tries; Adam Keighran 4 goals) defeated WOY WOY RED 6 (Samuel Bovis try; Khaleb Tyson goal) at Bluetongue Stadium, Graeme Park on Sunday, September 15, 2013.

2014
KINCUMBER 26 defeated TOUKLEY 18 at Morrie Breen Oval (Wyong RLC) on Sunday, September 14, 2014.

2015
THE ENTRANCE 40 defeated WYONG 4 at Industree Group Stadium, Graeme Park on Sunday, September 13, 2015.

2016

ERINA 28 defeated WYONG 18 at Industree Group Stadium, Graeme Park on Sunday September 11, 2016.

2020s

2020

THE ENTRANCE 24 defeated ERINA-OURIMBAH-WYOMING 6 at Industree Group Stadium on Sunday October 11, 2020.

2022

THE ENTRANCE 20 defeated TERRIGAL-WAMBERAL 18 at Industree Group Stadium on Sunday 28 August 2022.

== Division 2 ==
A second-tier Under 16 competition, Under 16-2s, has been held in 1996, between 2003 and 2012, and from 2014 to the present.

Under 16 – Division 2 grand finals
Season	Teams	Premiers	Runners-up	Score	Match type	Venue	Date	Minor premiers
1996	6	Budgewoi	Kincumber	34-6	Grand final		Sat 31 Aug 1996	Budgewoi
2003		Northern Lakes	The Entrance	32-30	Grand final	Industree Group Stadium	Sat 30 Aug 2003	
2004	8	The Entrance	St Edwards	12-10	Grand final	Industree Group Stadium	4 or 5 Sep 2004	
2005	10	St Edwards	Gosford	22-20	Grand final	Industree Group Stadium	Sun 11 Sep 2005	
2006	8	Berkeley Vale	Central Wyong	12-10	Grand final		Sat 16 Sep 2006	
2007	7	Berkeley Vale	Gosford	54-4	Grand final	Woy Woy Oval	Sat 15 Sep 2007	
2008	10	Wyong	Budgewoi	32-14	Grand final		6 or 7 Sep 2008	
2009	11	Budgewoi	Umina	22-18	Grand final			
2010	11	Budgewoi	Gosford	22-10	Grand final		11 or 12 Sep 2010	
2011		Erina	Blue Haven	52-10	Grand final	Morrie Breen Oval (Wyong RLC)	Sat 17 Sep 2011	
2012	12	Toukley	Terrigal	34-24	Grand final	Morrie Breen Oval (Wyong RLC)	Sat 8 Sep 2012	Toukley
2014	10	Budgewoi	Gosford	30-24	Grand final	Morrie Breen Oval (Wyong RLC)	Sun 14 Sep 2014	Gosford
2015	6	Kincumber	Wyong	24-16	Grand final	Industree Group Stadium	Sun 13 Sep 2015	Wyong
2016	8	Toukley	Wyong	24-16	Grand final	Industree Group Stadium	Sun 11 Sep 2016	Toukley
2020	8	Terrigal	Toukley	14-4	Grand final	Morrie Breen Oval (Wyong RLC)	Sat 10 Oct 2020	
2022	6	Ourimbah-Warnervale	Budgewoi	30-6	Grand final	CCRSRC/Tuggerah Field 2	Sat 27 Aug 2022	

=== Match details ===
1990s

1996
BUDGEWOI-BUFF POINT 34 (Wayne Nies 2, Beau Twyford, Matthew Frost, Cheyne Roberts tries; Justin White 5 goals) defeated KINCUMBER 6 (Brett Cowell try; Nathan Cunningham goal) at Graeme Park on Saturday, August 31, 1996.

==== 2000s ====
2003
NORTHERN LAKES 32 defeated THE ENTRANCE 30 at Industree Group Stadium, Graeme Park on Saturday, August 30, 2003.

2004
THE ENTRANCE 12 defeated ST EDWARDS 10 at Industree Group Stadium, Graeme Park in September, 2004.

2005
ST EDWARDS 22 defeated GOSFORD-KARIONG 20 at Industree Group Stadium on September 11, 2005.

2006
BERKELEY VALE 12 defeated CENTRAL WYONG 10 on Saturday, September 16, 2006.

2007
BERKELEY VALE 54 defeated GOSFORD-KARIONG 4 at Woy Woy Oval on Saturday, September 15, 2007.

2008
WYONG 32 defeated BUDGEWOI-BUFF POINT 14 on September 6 or 7, 2008.

2009
BUDGEWOI-BUFF POINT 22 defeated UMINA 18 on September 12 or 13, 2009.

==== 2010s ====
2010
BUDGEWOI-BUFF POINT 22 defeated GOSFORD-KARIONG 10 on September 11 or 12, 2010.

2011
ERINA 52 defeated BLUE HAVEN 10 at Morrie Breen Oval (Wyong RLC) on Saturday, September 17, 2011.

2012
TOUKLEY 34 defeated TERRIGAL-WAMBERAL 24 at Morrie Breen Oval (Wyong RLC) on Sunday, September 8, 2012.

2014
BUDGEWOI-BUFF POINT 30 defeated GOSFORD-KARIONG 24 at Morrie Breen on Sunday, September 14, 2014.

2015
KINCUMBER 24 defeated WYONG 16 at Industree Group Stadium, Graeme Park on Sunday, September 13, 2015.

2016
TOUKLEY 24 defeated WYONG 16 at Industree Group Stadium, Graeme Park on Sunday, September 11, 2016. Barry Deaker; son of Garry Deaker (former Wyong and London halfback) featured for Toukley off the bench. Ritesh Joggers was trainer for Toukley that day and is credited by the Toukley team as being instrumental in their performance, delivering the team with an inspiring half time talk.

2020s

2020

TERRIGAL-WAMBERAL 14 defeated TOUKLEY 4 at Wyong RLF Club Field 0, Kanwal on Saturday, October 10, 2020.

2022

OURIMBAH-WARNERVALE 30 defeated BUDGEWOI 6 at CCRSRC Field 2, Tuggerah on Saturday, August 27, 2022.

== Sources ==
- Microfilm of the following newspapers are available at the State Library of New South Wales and Central Coast Council libraries at Gosford and Wyong. The RAV numbers provided are those used by the State Library.

- Central Coast Express (RAV 61)
- Wyong and Lakes District Advocate (RAV 178)
- Wyong Shire Advocate (RAV 824)

- Erina Rugby League Football Club
- Woy Woy Roosters
- Fox Sports Pulse
- The following books are available at the Tuggerah Branch of the Central Coast Council Libraries

- George Glading (1995). History of Wyong Rugby League 1893-1995. Kanwal, New South Wales: Wyong Rugby League Club Limited. ISBN 0-646-25613-0.
- A History of The Entrance Rugby League Football Club - From Seagulls to Tigers 1934 to 2012. Bateau Bay, New South Wales: The Entrance Rugby League Football Club. 2013.
