= NSW Central Coast Rugby League reserve-grade grand finals =

This article provides information on the Reserve Grade, Second Grade or B Grade Grand Finals of Rugby League competitions held on the Central Coast of New South Wales, Australia. The Match Details sub-section details the individual point-scorers in a match, where known.

The current competition is conducted under the auspices of the Central Coast Division Rugby League, an affiliate of NSW Country Rugby League and the New South Wales Rugby League.

== List ==
Reserve Grade and Second Grade Grand Finals
Season	Teams	Premiers	Runners-Up	Score	Match Type	Extra Time	Venue	Date	Minor Premiers
1947	5	Wyong	Woy Woy	10–9	Grand Final	No		Sun 10 Aug 1947	
1948	6	Gosford	The Entrance	3–2	Grand Final			Sun 26 Sep 1948	
1949	6	Ourimbah	The Entrance	11–2	Grand Final	No	At Wyong	Sun 18 Sep 1949	Ourimbah
1950	6	The Entrance	Gosford	5–2	Final	No	At Wyong	Sun 27 Aug 1950	The Entrance
1951	6	Wyong	Ourimbah	8–2	Final	No	Grahame Park	Sun 12 Aug 1951	Ourimbah
1952	6	Woy Woy	Ourimbah	13–10	Final	No	Grahame Park	Sun 10 Aug 1952	Woy Woy
1953	6	Ourimbah	Woy Woy	7–0	Grand Final	No	Grahame Park	Sun 30 Aug 1953	Ourimbah
1954	7	Gosford	Woy Woy	31–0	Final	No	Grahame Park	Sun 29 Aug 1954	Gosford
1955	8	Woy Woy	The Entrance	21–7	Final		Grahame Park	Sun 11 Sep 1955	
1956	7	Toronto	Erina	16–0	Grand Final	No	Grahame Park	Sun 16 Sep 1956	Woy Woy
1957	7	Gosford	Woy Woy	14–9	Grand Final	No	Grahame Park	Sun 1 Sep 1957	Gosford
1958	7	Gosford	Woy Woy	15–12	Grand Final	Yes	Grahame Park	Sun 14 Sep 1958	Woy Woy
1959	6	Gosford	The Entrance	10–9	Grand Final	No	The Entrance	Sun 13 Sep 1959	
1960	6	Erina	Woy Woy	12–10	Grand Final	No	Erina Park	Sun 11 Sep 1960	Erina
1961	6	The Entrance	Erina	22–3	Grand Final		Grahame Park	Sun 10 Sep 1961	Woy Woy
1962	6	Erina	Woy Woy	15–3	Grand Final		Grahame Park	Sun 9 Sep 1962	Woy Woy
1963	6	Erina	Woy Woy	7–5	Grand Final		Grahame Park	Sun 15 Sep 1963	Woy Woy
1964	7	Woy Woy	Erina	15–6	Grand Final		Sohier Park	Sun 4 Oct 1964	Gosford
1965	7	Woy Woy	Ourimbah	17–6	Grand Final		Sohier Park	Sun 5 Sep 1965	Woy Woy
1966	7	Woy Woy	Ourimbah	14–7	Grand Final		Sohier Park	Sun 11 Sep 1966	Woy Woy
1967	7	Gosford	Erina	26–9	Grand Final		Grahame Park	Sun 1 Oct 1967	Gosford
1968	7	Woy Woy	Wyong	18–2	Grand Final	No	Sohier Park	Sun 15 Sep 1968	Woy Woy
1969	7	Wyong	Gosford	23–6	Grand Final			Sun 21 Sep 1969	Woy Woy
1970	7	Gosford	Woy Woy	11–8	Grand Final		Grahame Park	Sun 20 Sep 1970	Gosford
1971	7	Wyong	Erina	6–5	Grand Final		Grahame Park	Sun 26 Sep 1971	Woy Woy
1972	7	Wyong	Umina	12–5	Grand Final		Grahame Park	Sun 10 Sep 1972	Umina
1973	7	Umina	Gosford	24–8	Grand Final		Grahame Park	Sun 16 Sep 1973	Woy Woy
1974	7	Umina	Wyong	18–15	Grand Final	No	Grahame Park	Sun 29 Sep 1974	Wyong
1975	7	Wyong	Gosford	12–6	Grand Final			Sep 1975	
1976	8	Gosford	Woy Woy	24–6	Grand Final		Grahame Park	Sun 12 Sep 1976	
1977	8	Woy Woy	Wyong	31–5	Grand Final		Grahame Park	Sun 18 Sep 1977	Woy Woy
1978	8	Wyong	Woy Woy	12–8	Grand Final		Grahame Park	Sun 17 Sep 1978	Wyong
1979	9	Wyong	Woy Woy	16–5	Grand Final		Grahame Park	Sun 16 Sep 1979	Woy Woy
1980	9	Erina	Wyong	14–7	Grand Final		Grahame Park	Sun 14 Sep 1980	Wyong
1981	10	Erina	Toukley	15–4	Grand Final		Grahame Park	Sun 13 Sep 1981	
1982	10	Erina	Woy Woy	10–2	Grand Final		Grahame Park	Sun 19 Sep 1982	Wyong
1983	9	Erina	Umina	18–2	Grand Final	No	Grahame Park	Sun 18 Sep 1983	Umina
1984	9	Woy Woy	Wyong	16–10	Grand Final		Grahame Park	Sun 16 Sep 1984	Woy Woy
1985	9	Gosford	Terrigal	14–6	Grand Final		Grahame Park	Sun 15 Sep 1985	Gosford
1986	9	Wyong	Woy Woy	21–16	Grand Final		Grahame Park	Sun 7 Sep 1986	Woy Woy
1987	9	Wyong	Gosford	16–14	Grand Final	Yes	Grahame Park	Sun 6 Sep 1987	Wyong
1988	9	Wyong	Woy Woy	18–0	Grand Final	No	Grahame Park	Sun 18 Sep 1988	Wyong
1989	9	Terrigal	Woy Woy	24–22	Grand Final		Grahame Park	Sun 10 Sep 1989	Wyong
1990	9	Erina	Wyong	18–0	Grand Final				Erina
1991	10	The Entrance	Erina	16–13	Grand Final		Grahame Park	Sun 1 Sep 1991	Wyong
1992	10	The Entrance	Erina	24–14	Grand Final		Grahame Park	Sun 13 Sep 1992	The Entrance
1993	10	Erina	Wyong	18–13	Grand Final	No	Grahame Park	Sun 5 Sep 1993	Wyong
1994	10	Wyong	The Entrance	16–10	Grand Final		Grahame Park	Sun 4 Sep 1994	Umina
1995	10	Woy Woy	Wyong	16–10	Grand Final	No	Grahame Park	Sun 3 Sep 1995	Woy Woy
1996	9	Ourimbah	Wyong	16–10	Grand Final	No	Grahame Park	Sun 1 Sep 1996	Wyong
1997	9	Wyong	The Entrance	16–12	Grand Final	No	Grahame Park	Sun 7 Sep 1997	
1998	8	Erina	Wyong	20–12	Grand Final	No	Grahame Park	Sun 30 Aug 1998	
1999	9	Woy Woy	Wyong	34–8	Grand Final	No	Woy Woy Oval	Sun 5 Sep 1999	The Entrance
2000	8	Woy Woy	Wyong	15–14	Grand Final	No	Northpower Stadium	Sat 26 Aug 2000	
2001	8	Wyong	The Entrance	44–4	Grand Final	No	Northpower Stadium	Sun 2 Sep 2001	Wyong
2002	8	Wyong	The Entrance	16–14	Grand Final	No	Central Coast Stadium	Sun 1 Sep 2002	Wyong
2006	12	Terrigal	The Entrance	22–10	Grand Final	No	Morrie Breen Oval	Sat 30 Sep 2006	Ourimbah
2007	11	The Entrance	Central Wyong	22–14	Grand Final		Woy Woy Oval	Sun 23 Sep 2007	Ourimbah
2008	11	Northern Lakes	The Entrance	33–32	Grand Final	No	Bluetounge Stadium	Sun 21 Sep 2008	The Entrance
2009	10	The Entrance	Northern Lakes	42–16	Grand Final	No	Morrie Breen Oval	Sun 20 Sep 2009	Erina
2010	10	Berkeley Vale	Erina	36–12	Grand Final	No	EDSACC Oval	Sat 18 Sep 2010	Erina
2011	11	The Entrance	Erina	16–4	Grand Final	No	Morrie Breen Oval	Sat 17 Sep 2011	Central Wyong
2012	10	Umina	Ourimbah	22–10	Grand Final		Morrie Breen Oval	Sat 15 Sep 2012	Umina
2013	12	Wyong	Berkeley Vale	42–24	Grand Final		Morrie Breen Oval	Sat 21 Sep 2013	Wyong
2014	12	Berkeley Vale	Wyong	26–20	Grand Final		Morrie Breen Oval	Sat 20 Sep 2014	Wyong
2015	12	The Entrance	Wyong	32–14	Grand Final		Morrie Breen Oval	Sat 19 Sep 2015	Wyong
2016	10	Kincumber	The Entrance	22–14	Grand Final	No	Woy Woy Oval	Sat 17 Sep 2016	The Entrance
2017	10	The Entrance	Terrigal	23–22	Grand Final	Yes	Woy Woy Oval	Sun 17 Sep 2017	The Entrance
2018	10	The Entrance	Wyong	34–14	Grand Final	No	Woy Woy Oval	Sun 16 Sep 2018	Wyong
2019	10	The Entrance	Kincumber	16–8	Grand Final	No	Woy Woy Oval	Sun 29 Sep 2018	The Entrance

Note:

- No Reserve/Second Grade Competition was held in 2003, 2004 or 2005, At that time, five of the clubs fielded teams in the Jim Beam Cup or the Newcastle Rugby League. Their reserves team played in the Central Coast First Division competition, along with the top sides of the other clubs.
- The colour boxes reflected the club colours in the corresponding season. Woy Woy and The Entrance have changed colours during their history.
- Prior to Grand Finals becoming compulsory in 1956, a Grand Final was held only if the minor premier was beaten either in the semi-final of Final.

== Match details ==
1949
OURIMBAH 11 (William Hunter try; Owen Morris 4 goals) defeated THE ENTRANCE 2 (C Fitzsimmons goal) at Wyong on Sunday, September 18, 1949.

1950 (B Grade Final)
THE ENTRANCE 5 (R. Powell try; W. Fitzsimmons goal) defeated GOSFORD 2 (Des Hattley goal) at Wyong on Sunday, August 20, 1950.

1951 (B Grade Final)
WYONG 8 (R. Osborne, J. Clouten tries; Fred Eaton goal) defeated OURIMBAH 2 (O. Morris goal) on Sunday, August 12, 1951.

1952 (B Grade Final)
WOY WOY 13 (R. Piconi, W. Ward, R. Donnelly tries; J. Connell 2 goals) defeated OURIMBAH 10 (J. Crisp, Brown tries; J. Frewin 2 goals) at Grahame Park on Sunday, August 17, 1952. Referee: Deaves.

1953 (B Grade)
OURIMBAH 7 (R. Frewin try; K. Williams 2 goals) defeated WOY WOY nil at Grahame Park on Sunday, August 30, 1953.

1954 (B Grade Final)
GOSFORD 31 (William Kirwin 3, Bev Smith 2, B. Hickey, K. Graham tries; C. Hore 5 goals) defeated WOY WOY nil at Grahame Park on Sunday, August 29, 1954.

1955 (B Grade Final)
WOY WOY 21 (C. “Chic” Holden, Ron Derley, R. “Doc” McDermott, Jim King, Ray Cochrane tries; “Buller” Cross 3 goals) defeated THE ENTRANCE 7 (Brian Eggleton try; Brian Gee 2 goals) at Grahame Park.

1956
TORONTO 16 (B. McGrath 2, B. Wellings, K. Ewart tries; Alan Leahey, Sid Taylor goals) defeated ERINA nil at Grahame Park on Sunday, September 16, 1956. Referee: Hextall.

1957
GOSFORD 14 (Ron Hansen, B. Green tries; Lin Bailey 4 goals) defeated WOY WOY 9 (J. Coffey try and 3 goals) at Grahame Park on Sunday, September 1, 1957.

1958
GOSFORD 15 (R. Smith 2, A. Goldie tries; R. Haggerty 3 goals) defeated WOY WOY 12 (Brian Halderman, H. Hayward tries; J. Coffey 3 goals) at Grahame Park on Sunday, September 14, 1958.

1959
GOSFORD 10 (J. Cunnington, Lindsay Bailey tries; K. Hayward, Lindsay Bailey goals) defeated THE ENTRANCE 9 (K. Price try and 3 goals) at The Entrance on Sunday, September 20, 1959.

=== 1960s ===
1960
ERINA 12 (A. Whelpton, M. Pickett tries; J. Walters 2, J. Davis goals) defeated WOY WOY 10 (R. McFarlane, H. Hayward tries; J. Coffey 2 goals) at Erina on Sunday, September 11, 1960.

1961 (B Grade)
THE ENTRANCE 22 (Ray Parsons, J. Sewell, John Shore, C. Brown tries; Harold Evans, John Shore 4 goals) defeated ERINA 3 (Brian Graham try).

1963 (Reserve Grade)
ERINA 7 (John Smith try; William Geldart 2 goals) defeated WOY WOY 5 (Dave Jones try; Merv McGahey goal).

1965
WOY WOY 15 (Max Wootton, R. Jones, Greg Quill tries; Eric Rowlands 3 goals) defeated OURIMBAH 6 (Lance Burkwood 2, K. Henry goals). Referee: N. Davidson.

1966
WOY WOY 11 (John Bourne 2, Eric Rowlands tries; Eric Rowlands goal) defeated OURIMBAH 7 (Robert Rushton try; William Hill 2 goals). Referee: Gordon Hattley.

1967
GOSFORD 26 (Keith Jack 3, William Mulheron 2, Robert Guest tries; Kevin Annand 2, William Kirwin 2, Peter Martin goals) defeated ERINA 9 (Richard Edwards try; Keith Walsh 3 goals). Referee: Alan Parsons.

1968 (Second Grade)
WOY WOY 18 (Terry Dries, Geoff Pollett, Arthur Bartlett, Merv McGahey tries; Warren Taylor 2, Merv McGahey goals) defeated WYONG 2 (Noel Anderson goal).

1969
WYONG 23 (G. Sonter 2, P. Chapman, L. Tonks, J. Cox tries; L. Tonks 4 goals) defeated GOSFORD 6 (T. Crouch 2 goals and a field goal).

=== 1970s ===
1970
GOSFORD 11 (William Nash try; Robert Whitton 3 goals; Dave Mills field goal) defeated WOY WOY 8 (Les Shaw, Lindsay Collins tries; Mick Allen goal).

1971
WYONG 6 (Len Tonks 3 goals) defeated ERINA 5 (Warrick Bissaker try and goal).

1972
WYONG 12 (William Scott, Mick Leaudais tries; Len Tonks 3 goals) defeated UMINA 5 (Peter Becker try; Paul Ryan goal).

1973
UMINA 24 (Mick Hicks 2, Frank Walpole 2, Terry Roberts, S. Cox tries, Mick Hicks 3 goals) defeated GOSFORD 8 (John Dodd 2 tries; Kim Plater goal).

1974
UMINA 18 (Ken Tillman 2, P. Quick, J Richards tries; Mick Hicks 3 goals) defeated WYONG 15 (B. Caulfield, P. Merrick, D. Woolbank) at Grahame Park.

1976 (Second Grade)
GOSFORD 24 (Barry Weinert 3, Kim Plater tries; Roger Plater 6 goals) defeated WOY WOY 6 (Peter Becker 2 tries).

1977
WOY WOY 31 (Brad Murray 3, Gary Mason, Brad Cunnynghame, Noel Annand, Glen Compton tries; Noel Annand 5 goals) defeated WYONG 5 (Paul Healy 2 goals, field goal).

1978 (Second Grade)
WYONG 12 (Geoff Greentree, Ian Bridge tries; Ross Lewis 3 goals) defeated WOY WOY 8 (Steve Heath, Paul Thomas tries; Harry Overton goal).

1979
WYONG 16 (Peter Haley, Geoff Greentree, Ray Waldron, Tony Keevell tries; Alan Cheal 2 goals) defeated WOY WOY 5 (Gary Fitch try; Terry Roberts goal).

=== 1980s ===
1980
ERINA 14 (Rob Varday, Kevin Kirk tries; George Cooke 4 goals) defeated WYONG 7 (Dave Irwin try; P. Russell 2 goals) at Grahame Park on Sunday, September 14, 1980. Referee: Trevor Pickett.

1981
ERINA 15 defeated TOUKLEY 4 at Grahame Park on Sunday, September 13, 1981.

1982
ERINA 10 (Peter Wilson, Mick Ayton tries; George Pace 2 goals) defeated WOY WOY 2 (Richard Ford goal) at Grahame Park on Sunday, September 19, 1982. Referee: R. Sinclair.

1983
ERINA 18 (Greg Ramsay, Mathew Sharman tries; Paul Stanimeros 5 goals) defeated UMINA 2 (Darren Guest goal) at Grahame Park on Sunday, September 18, 1983. Referee: R. Saunders, Snr.

1984
WOY WOY 16 (Pat Dalton, Geoff Staunton tries; Steve Foody 4 goals) defeated WYONG 10 (Col Johnson try; Bob Shaw 3 goals) at Grahame Park on Sunday, September 16, 1984. Referee: Bill Curnoe.

1985
GOSFORD 14 (Anthony Clarke, Shane Upton tries; Brian Wishart 3 goals) defeated TERRIGAL 6 (Stuart Pike try; Carey Smith goal) at Grahame Park on Sunday, September 15, 1985. Referee: Robert Saunders.

1986
WYONG 21 (Simon Devlin 2, Ralph Poppi, Justin Brown tries; Greg Pearce 2 goals; Greg Pearce field goal) defeated WOY WOY 16 (Noel Annand, J. Mitchell, K. Fuller tries; S. Foody 2 goals) at Grahame Park on Sunday, September 10, 1989. Referee: J. Wells.

1987
WYONG 16 (unnamed tries; Greg Pearce, Brian Wishart goals) defeated GOSFORD 14 (Lenny Wright 2, Kevin Bloomfield tries; unnamed goals) in extra time at Grahame Park on Sunday, September 6, 1987. Referee: Kelvin Menchen.

1988
WYONG 18 (Steve Brown, Joe Narisia, Ritchie Montgomery tries; Ritchie Montgomery 3 goals) defeated WOY WOY 10 (Ken Forrester, Greg Brown tries; unnamed goal) at Grahame Park on Sunday, September 18, 1988.

1989
TERRIGAL-WAMBERAL 24 (Darren Dunn and others tries; Paul Ryan goals) defeated WOY WOY 22 at Grahame Park on Sunday, September 10, 1989. Referee: Kel Menchin.

=== 1990s ===
1991
THE ENTRANCE 16 (Michael Hart, Tony McCudden, Mark Hemming tries; Beecher 2 goals) defeated ERINA 13 (Michael Duke, Adrian Drew tries; Simon Watson 2 goals; Stephen Burns field goal) at Grahame Park on Sunday, September 1, 1991. Referee: Kel Menchin.

1992
THE ENTRANCE 24 (Stephen McSweeney, Dean Goodman, Glenn Ambrose tries; Jason Carpenter 6 goals) defeated ERINA 14 (Darren Neilsen, Peter Davis and one other tries; one goal) at Grahame Park on Sunday, September 13, 1992. Referee: W. Curnoe.

1993
ERINA 18 (Todd Petrie 2, Brett McKay, Craig Elton tries; unnamed goal) defeated WYONG 13 (Mark Vanderstock, Doug Baker, Darrell Squires tries; Ritchie Montgomery field goal) at Grahame Park on Sunday, September 5, 1993. Referee: R. Windle.

1994
WYONG 16 (Darren Adamo, Andrew Byles tries; Ritchie Montgomery 4 goals) defeated THE ENTRANCE 10 (Dave Piggins try; Tane Knebel 3 goals) at Grahame Park on Sunday, September 4, 1994.

1995
WOY WOY 16 (Warren Staunton, Adam Flakus tries; Troy Kent 4 goals) defeated WYONG 10 (Mark Ivers, Tim Dilandro tries; unnamed goal) at Grahame Park on Sunday, September 3, 1995.

1996
OURIMBAH 16 (Nick Walshaw, Max McGovern, Anthony Scarr tries; Michael Timp 2 goals) defeated WYONG 10 (Mark Vanderstok, Darren Leaudais tries; unnamed goal) at Grahame Park on Sunday, September 1, 1996.

1997
WYONG 16 (Scott Purcell, Daniel Lewis tries; Errol Mehmet 4 goals) defeated THE ENTRANCE 12 (Russell Groth, Graham Settree tries; unnamed goals) at Grahame Park on Sunday, September 7, 1997.

1998
ERINA 20 (Billy Felton, Dean English, Michael Erickson tries; Matt Whyte 4 goals) defeated WYONG 12 (Daniel Lawson, Stuart Lofts tries; Errol Mehmet 2 goals) at Grahame Park on Sunday, August 30, 1998. Referee: Ray Windle.

1999
WOY WOY 38 (Brett Rodgers 3, Peter Harrison, Nathan Johnson and others tries; unnamed goals) defeated WYONG 8 at Woy Woy Oval on Sunday, September 5, 1999.

=== 2000s ===
2000
WOY WOY 15 (Tries; goals; Stephen Monie field goal) defeated WYONG 14 at NorthPower Stadium, Grahame Park on Saturday, August 26, 2000.

2001
WYONG 44 (Jason Cashin 2 and others tries) defeated THE ENTRANCE 4.

2002
WYONG 16 (Matt Lavin 2, Chris Garratley tries; Matt Lavin 2 goals) defeated THE ENTRANCE 14 at Central Coast Stadium, Grahame Park on Sunday, September 1, 2002.

2003 to 2005 no reserve grade or second grade competition.

2006
TERRIGAL 22 (Matthew Hunter, B. McMahon, Daniel McCarthy, S. Maginnity tries; P. Pearson 3 goals) defeated THE ENTRANCE 10 (A. Cotterill 2 tries, B. McCabe goal)

2007
THE ENTRANCE 22 defeated CENTRAL WYONG 14 at Woy Woy Oval on Sunday, September 23, 2007.

2008
NORTHERN LAKES 33 defeated THE ENTRANCE 32 at Bluetounge Stadium on Sunday, September 21, 2008.

2009
THE ENTRANCE 42 (Jake Treloar 3 and others tries) defeated NORTHERN LAKES 16 at Morrie Breen on Sunday, September 20, 2009.

=== 2010s ===
2010
BERKELEY VALE 36 defeated ERINA 12.

2011
THE ENTRANCE 16 defeated ERINA 4 at Morrie Breen on Saturday, September 17, 2011.

2012
UMINA BEACH 22 (Dean Young, Terrence O’Sullivan, Ben Paget, Zane, Ririnui tries; Shane O’Sullivan 3 goals) defeated OURIMBAH-WYOMING 10 (Christopher Alipate, Corey Drew tries; John Buckley goal) at Morrie Breen on Saturday, September 15, 2012.

2013
WYONG 42 (Mitchell Nakhoul 2, Paneere Kaaka, Josiah Fonua, Joel Anderson, Brent Stevens tries; Paneere Kaaka 7 goals) defeated BERKELEY VALE 24 (Dennis Little, Jeremy Smith, Kyle Lear, Malcolm Perry, Shannon Allman tries; Dennis Little, Jeremy Smith goals) at Morrie Breen on Saturday, September 21, 2013.

2014
BERKELEY VALE 26 (Jake Callister 3 tries, Malcolm Parry, Vindon Spence tries; Mitchell Booth 2, Dennis Little goals) defeated WYONG 20 (Shaun Wright 2, Beau Richards, Shaan Anderson tries; Shaun Wright 2 goals) at Morrie Breen on Saturday, September 20, 2014.

2015
THE ENTRANCE 32 (Harley Waters 2, Ryan Doherty, Luke Kirkby, Jordan Huckstepp, Brodyn Mills tries; Ryan Doherty 4 goals) defeated WYONG 14 (Shaun Wright, Jake Fuller tries; Glenn Smith 3 goals) at Morrie Breen on Saturday, September 19, 2015.

2016
KINCUMBER 22 (Tim Giffin, Nathan Brown, Mitchell Clark, Joe Dawes tries; Blake Wylie 3 goals) defeated THE ENTRANCE 14 (Luke Kirkby 2, one other tries; one goal) at Woy Woy Oval on Saturday, September 17, 2016.

== Sources ==
- Digitised newspapers at the National Library of Australia's Trove website

- Gosford Times and Wyong District Advocate
- The Newcastle Herald

- Microfilm of the following newspapers are available at the State Library of New South Wales and Central Coast Council libraries at Gosford and Wyong. The RAV numbers provided are those used by the State Library.

- Gosford Times (RAV 24 - Reels #1, 1897-1900; #31 to #40, 1955 to 1962)
- Central Coast Express (RAV 61)
- The Guardian (The Entrance and Wyong) (RAV 63 - Reels #1 and #2, 1933-1959 miscellaneous)
- Wyong and Lakes District Advocate (RAV 178 - Reel #2, 1932-1956 miscellaneous)

- Erina Rugby League Football Club
- Woy Woy Roosters
- Fox Sports Pulse
- The following books are available at the Tuggerah Branch of the Central Coast Council Libraries

- George Glading (1995). History of Wyong Rugby League 1893-1995. Kanwal, New South Wales: Wyong Rugby League Club Limited. ISBN 0-646-25613-0.
- A History of The Entrance Rugby League Football Club - From Seagulls to Tigers 1934 to 2012. Bateau Bay, New South Wales: The Entrance Rugby League Football Club. 2013.
