= The Gosford Times and Wyong District Advocate =

The Gosford Times and Wyong District Advocate, Friday 25 May 1906

The Gosford Times and Wyong District Advocate, also published as Gosford Times and Gosford & Wollombi Express and the Times-Herald, was a weekly English language newspaper published in Gosford, New South Wales, Australia.

== History ==
The newspaper was founded by publisher Alfred Higgs in 1883 with the title Gosford Times and Gosford & Wollombi Express. In May 1906 the newspaper changed its title to The Gosford Times and Wyong District Advocate, which it remained until 25 September 1961 when it changed its title to Times-Herald. In May 1938 the paper absorbed the Gosford title Man on the Land. The paper was bought by the Henderson family in November 1962 who absorbed it in their paper Central Coast Express in December 1962.

== Digitisation ==
The paper has been digitised as part of the Australian Newspapers Digitisation Program project of the National Library of Australia.

== Availability ==
As of June 2016, the digitisation of The Gosford Times covers the years 1905 to 1954 in which copies of the newspaper are known to have survived. In addition, microfilm copies are available for the period from July 1897 to December 1904, and the years 1955 to 1962. There is also a microfilm reel with a few miscellaneous issues of The Gosford Times and Wyong Advocate.

During the period of its existence, there were two other newspapers from the Central Coast (New South Wales) for which copies survived, albeit in patches. Microfilm reels exist for The Guardian and The Wyong and Lakes District Advocate.

== See also ==
- List of newspapers in Australia
- List of newspapers in New South Wales
