= NSW Central Coast Rugby League under-18 grand finals =

This article provides information on the under 18 premiership deciders of rugby league competitions held on the Central Coast of New South Wales, Australia. The match details sub-section details the individual point-scorers in a match, where known.

The most recent Under 18 competition was held in 2013. In 2016, an Under 19 competition was conducted under the auspices of the Central Coast Division Rugby League and an Under 17 competition was run by the Junior body / association. Both are affiliates of NSW Country Rugby League and the New South Wales Rugby League.

== List ==
Under 18 Grand Finals
Season	Teams	Premiers	Runners-up	Score	Match type	Extra time	Venue	Date	Minor premiers
1968	7	Ourimbah	Wyong	9–8	Grand Final	No	Sohier Park	Sun 15 Sep 1968	Wyong
1969	7	Wyong	Gosford	16–8	Grand Final	No	Sohier Park	Sun 21 Sep 1969	Wyong
1970	7	Wyong	Erina	7–6	Grand Final	No	Grahame Park	Sun 20 Sep 1970	Erina
1971	8	Woy Woy	Wyong	15–12	Grand Final	No	Grahame Park	Sun 26 Sep 1971	
1972	8	Gosford	Wyong	16–3	Grand Final	No	Grahame Park	Sun 10 Sep 1972	Wyong
1973	7	Gosford	Erina	6–5	Grand Final	No	Grahame Park	Sun 16 Sep 1973	Gosford
1974	8	Erina	Umina	17–2	Grand Final	No	Grahame Park	Sun 29 Sep 1974	Erina
1975	8	Woy Woy	Wyong	12–7	Grand Final		Grahame Park	Sun 21 Sep 1975	Wyong
1976	8	Erina	Woy Woy	12–10	Grand Final	No	Grahame Park	Sun 12 Sep 1976	Wyong
1977	8	Erina	Wyong	11–5	Grand Final	No	Grahame Park	Sun 18 Sep 1977	Erina
1978	8	Wyong	Umina	6–2	Grand Final	No	Grahame Park	Sun 17 Sep 1978	Wyong
1983	6	Umina	Wyong	9–8	Grand Final	No	Grahame Park	Sun 18 Sep 1983	Umina
1984	7	Wyong	Gosford	16–10	Grand Final	No	Grahame Park	Sun 16 Sep 1984	Wyong
1985	9	Wyong	Terrigal	12–10	Grand Final	No	Grahame Park	Sun 15 Sep 1985	Terrigal
1986	9	Terrigal	Wyong	10–6	Grand Final	No	Grahame Park	Sun 7 Sep 1986	Wyong
1987	9	Woy Woy	Gosford	16–10	Grand Final	No	Grahame Park	Sun 6 Sep 1987	Wyong
1988	9	Woy Woy	Gosford	14–12	Grand Final	Yes	Grahame Park	Sun 18 Sep 1988	Gosford
1989	9	Woy Woy	Gosford	16–14	Grand Final	No	Grahame Park	Sun 10 Sep 1989	Erina
1990	10	Woy Woy	Erina	14–7	Grand Final	No	Grahame Park	Sun 9 Sep 1990	Umina
1991	10	Erina	Umina	22–6	Grand Final	No	Grahame Park	Sun 1 Sep 1991	Umina
1992	9	The Entrance	Erina	11–10	Grand Final	No	Grahame Park	Sun 13 Sep 1992	Erina
1993	9	Ourimbah	Terrigal	30–19	Grand Final	Yes	Grahame Park	Sun 5 Sep 1993	Terrigal
1994	10	The Entrance	Gosford	13–6	Grand Final	No	Grahame Park	Sun 4 Sep 1994	
1995	10	Wyong	Gosford	21–14	Grand Final	No	Grahame Park	Sun 3 Sep 1995	Wyong
1996	10	Wyong	The Entrance	16–2	Grand Final	No	Grahame Park	Sun 1 Sep 1996	Wyong
1997	8	The Entrance	Woy Woy	10–6	Grand Final	No	Grahame Park	Sun 7 Sep 1997	The Entrance
1998	8	Wyong	The Entrance	16–4	Grand Final	No	Grahame Park	Sun 30 Aug 1998	
1999	9	Wyong	Umina	24–14	Grand Final	No	Woy Woy Oval	Sun 5 Sep 1999	Wyong
2009	10	Terrigal		-	Grand Final		Morrie Breen Oval	Sun 20 Sep 2009	The Entrance
2012	8	The Entrance	Toukley	36–20	Grand Final		Morrie Breen Oval	Sat 15 Sep 2012	Erina
2013	8	Wyong	Erina	34–14	Grand Final		Morrie Breen Oval	Sat 21 Sep 2013	Erina

== Match details ==
1968
OURIMBAH 9 (Robert Footte try; Peter Preston 3 goals) defeated WYONG 8 (Joe Walmsley, Peter Maundrell tries; Howard Burns goal) at Sohier Park on Sunday, September 15, 1968.

1969
WYONG 16 (Mick Leaudais, Robert Caulfield tries; Ken Peel 4 goals; Peter Maundrell field goal) defeated GOSFORD 8 (Michael O’Toole, Rick Roberts tries; Michael O’Toole goal) on Sunday, September 21, 1969.

=== 1970s ===
1970
WYONG 7 (Kel Wynn try; Ken Peel 2 goals) defeated ERINA 6 (Wayne Shooter, Lloyd Dixon tries) at Grahame Park on Sunday, September 20, 1970.

1971
WOY WOY 15 (Peter Robertson 2, Terry Roberts tries; Bill McNamara 3 goals) defeated WYONG 12 (Merrick Lindsay, C. Williams tries; Colin Peel 3 goals) at Grahame Park on Sunday, September 26, 1971.

1972
GOSFORD 16 (Rick Legge 2, J. Clements, Barry Weinert tries; Trevor Binskin, Barry Weinert goals) defeated WYONG 3 (Merrick Lindsay try) at Grahame Park on Sunday, September 10, 1972.

1973
GOSFORD 6 (Barry Weinert, Paul Needham tries) defeated ERINA 5 (Peter Creevey try; Graham Marchant goal) at Grahame Park on Sunday, September 16, 1973.

1974
ERINA 17 (five tries; goal) defeated UMINA 2 (goal) at Grahame Park on Sunday, September 29, 1974.

1975
WOY WOY 12 defeated WYONG 7 at Grahame Park on Sunday, September 21, 1975.

1976
ERINA 12 (Phillip Griffiths, David Uhler tries; B. Taylor 3 goals) defeated WOY WOY 10 (David Warwick, Jeff Goodworth tries; Doug Diversi 2 goals) on Sunday, September 12, 1976.

1977
ERINA 11 (Geoff Sopp, David Uhleer tries; G. Breedon 2 goals, D. Harris field goal) defeated WYONG 5 (Gary Prior try; Ross Lewis goal) at Grahame Park on Sunday, September 18, 1977.

1978
WYONG 6 (Brett Shearman, Jim Carey tries) defeated UMINA 2 (Alan Williams goal) on Sunday, September 17, 1978.

=== 1980s ===
1983
UMINA 9 (Col Wormleaton 4 goals and a field goal) defeated WYONG 8 (Col Thompson try; Garry Walsh 2 goals) at Grahame Park on Sunday, September 18, 1983. Referee: W. Curnoe.

1984
WYONG 16 (Adrian Tschanter 2, David Perry tries; David Perry 2 goals) defeated GOSFORD 10 (Neal Hayter, Steve Carter tries; Michael Bishenden goal) at Grahame Park on Sunday, September 16, 1984.

1985
WYONG 12 (Adam Bourke, Ritchie Montgomery tries; unknown 2 goals) defeated TERRIGAL 10 (two tries; goal) at Grahame Park on Sunday, September 15, 1985. Referee: Bob Saunders.

1986
TERRIGAL-WAMBERAL 10 (Gary Bezrouchka, Paul McDonald tries; Billy Felton goal) defeated WYONG 6 (Ritchie Montgomery try; unnamed goal) at Grahame Park on Sunday, September 10, 1989. Referee: L. Metti.

1987
WOY WOY 16 (Wayne Robinson and three others tries) defeated GOSFORD 10 (two tries; one goal) at Grahame Park on Sunday, September 6, 1987.

1988
WOY WOY 14 (Stephen Plummer 2, Michael Douglas tries; Adam Campbell goal) defeated GOSFORD 12 (Paul Crawley, Paul Kent tries; Mark Winspear 2 goals) in extra-time at Grahame Park on Sunday, September 18, 1988.

1989
WOY WOY 16 (Chris Terrill, Simon Spinks tries; Adam Campbell 4 goals) defeated GOSFORD 14 (Michael Turner, Mark Winspear tries; three unnamed goals) at Grahame Park on Sunday, September 10, 1989. Referee: R. Saunders.

=== 1990s ===
1990
WOY WOY 14 (Jason Risk, Jason Pillings tries; Brendan Driscoll 3 goals) defeated ERINA 7 (Jason Johnson 3 goals; Darren Druett field goal) at Grahame Park on Sunday, September 9, 1990. Referee: B. Whitelaw.

1991
ERINA 22 (Keiron Edwards, Eddie Anderson, Daniel Fitzpatrick, Ben Watt tries; Shane King at least one of three goals) defeated UMINA 6 (Brendan Douglas try; unnamed goal) at Grahame Park on Sunday, September 1, 1991. Referee: A. Last

1992
THE ENTRANCE 11 (Matt Hyde, Michael Raco tries; John Catts goal; Adam Waters field goal) defeated ERINA 10 (Steve Monie, Todd Petrie tries; Trevor Hamilton goal) at Grahame Park on Sunday, September 13, 1992. Referee: S. Shailer.

1993
OURIMBAH 30 (Adam Hill, Tim Lancett and others tries; five goals) defeated TERRIGAL-WAMBERAL 19 (Fred King and others tries; three goals; Damien Wright field goal) in extra-time at Grahame Park on Sunday, September 5, 1993. Referee: D. Allen.

1994
THE ENTRANCE 13 (Stephen Booth and one other tries; Brian Rees 2 goals; unnamed field goal) defeated GOSFORD 6 (Justin Murdoch try; unnamed goal) at Grahame Park on Sunday, September 4, 1994.

1995
WYONG 21 (Scott Considine, Brad Smith, Luke O’Brien, Troy Redman tries; two unnamed goals; unnamed field goal) defeated GOSFORD 14 (Paul Holmes, Brian Skuse, Trent Murphy tries; unnamed goal) at Grahame Park on Sunday, September 3, 1995.

1996
WYONG 16 (Luke O’Brien, Daniel Wade, Kevin Turkington tries; two unnamed goals) defeated THE ENTRANCE 2 (Daniel Lorusso goal) at Grahame Park on Sunday, September 1, 1996.

1997
THE ENTRANCE 10 (Anthony Cotterill; Brent Soutar 3 goals) defeated WOY WOY 6 (Luke Marshall try; unnamed goal) at Grahame Park on Sunday, September 7, 1997.

1998
WYONG 16 (Michael Black 2, Jayde Farrell tries; Lance Lloyd 2 goals) defeated THE ENTRANCE 4 (Todd Bolton try) at Grahame Park on Sunday, August 30, 1998.

1999
WYONG 24 (Clinton Allsop, Russell Green, Ben Coughlan and others tries; unnamed goals) defeated UMINA 14 (Chris Heighington, Jake Westerman and one other tries; unnamed goals) at Woy Woy Oval on Sunday, September 5, 1999.

2009
TERRIGAL won at Morrie Breen Oval, Kanwal on Sunday, September 20, 2009.

2012
THE ENTRANCE 36 (Hayden Green, Daniel Henessey, Thomas Moloney, Nathan Lane, Liam Crawford, Daniel Richardson, Kayden Lawson tries; Hayden Green 4 goals) defeated TOUKLEY 20 (Andrew Callow, Matthew Dicks, Samuel Heterick, Josiah Fonua tries; Andrew Callow, Matthew Dicks goals) at Morrie Breen on Saturday, September 15, 2012.

2013
WYONG 34 (Luke Sharpe 2, Rory Stephen 2, Brad Keighran, Dean Coughlan tries; Brad Keighran 5 goals) defeated ERINA 14 (Nathan Deane, Jack Carlisle, Noah Easton tries; Ryan Sheppard goal) at Morrie Breen on Saturday, September 21, 2013.

== Division 2 ==
There has been one second tier Under 18 competition.

Under 18 Division 2 Grand Finals
Season	Teams	Premiers	Runners-up	Score	Match type	Extra time	Venue	Date	Minor premiers
2012	6	Kincumber	Woy Woy	14–4	Grand Final		Morrie Breen Oval	Sat 15 Sep 2012	Terrigal

2012
KINCUMBER 14 (Kyle Sabroe 2 tries; Joseph Wheatley tries; Thomas Gray goal) defeated WOY WOY 4 (Coen Hardy try) at Morrie Breen on Saturday, September 15, 2012.

== Sources ==
- Microfilm of the following newspapers are available at the State Library of New South Wales and Central Coast Council libraries at Gosford and Wyong. The RAV numbers provided are those used by the State Library.

- Central Coast Express (RAV 61)
- Wyong and Lakes District Advocate (RAV 178)
- Wyong Shire Advocate (RAV 824)

- Erina Rugby League Football Club
- Woy Woy Roosters
- Fox Sports Pulse
- The following books are available at the Tuggerah Branch of the Central Coast Council Libraries

- George Glading (1995). History of Wyong Rugby League 1893-1995. Kanwal, New South Wales: Wyong Rugby League Club Limited. ISBN 0-646-25613-0.
- A History of The Entrance Rugby League Football Club - From Seagulls to Tigers 1934 to 2012. Bateau Bay, New South Wales: The Entrance Rugby League Football Club. 2013.
