= NSW Central Coast Rugby League under-17 grand finals =

This article provides information on the under 16 premiership deciders of rugbyleague competitions held on the Central Coast of New South Wales, Australia. The match details sub-section details the individual point-scorers in a match, where known.

The current competition is conducted under the auspices of the Central Coast Division Junior Rugby League, an affiliate of NSW Country Rugby League and the New South Wales Rugby League.

A predecessor to Under 16 and Under 17 competitions was D Grade, which was held from 1955 to 1966. When Group status was obtained in 1967, C and D Grade became Under 19 and Under 17. The following year they were changed to Under 18 and Under 16. Between 1979 and 1982 the two competitions reverted to Under 19 and Under 17. In 2000, Third Grade and Under 18s were replaced by Under 19 and Under 17 competitions. There has been an Under 17 competition in each subsequent season, apart from 2012. Since 2015, Under 17s has been run by the junior body and played on Saturdays, rather than as a curtain-raiser to Sunday grade matches.

== List ==
Under 17 Grand Finals
Season	Teams	Premiers	Runners-up	Score	Match type	Extra time	Venue	Date	Minor premiers
1967		Woy Woy	Wyong	10–8	Grand Final		Grahame Park	Sun 1 Oct 1967	
1979	9	Erina	Gosford	23–12	Grand Final	No	Grahame Park	Sun 16 Sep 1979	Gosford
1980	9	Erina	Umina	9–6	Grand Final	No	Grahame Park	Sun 14 Sep 1980	Umina
1981	8	Woy Woy	Wyong	14–8	Grand Final	No	Grahame Park	Sun 13 Sep 1981	Woy Woy
1982	7	Wyong	Erina	6–2	Grand Final	No	Grahame Park	Sun 19 Sep 1982	Umina
2000	8	Wyong	Umina	32–12	Grand Final	No	NorthPower Stadium	Sat 26 Aug 2000	
2001	7	Umina	The Entrance	28–24	Grand Final	No	NorthPower Stadium	Sun 2 Sep 2001	Umina
2002	6	Ourimbah	Wyong	24–10	Grand Final		Central Coast Stadium	Sun 1 Sep 2002	Northern Lakes
2003	8	Kincumber	Wyong	32–16	Grand Final		CCEA Stadium	Sun 31 Aug 2003	Wyong
2004	10	Berkeley Vale	Erina	18–16	Grand Final		CCEA Stadium	Sun 12 Sep 2004	Wyong
2005	10	The Entrance	Wyong	24–18	Grand Final		Morrie Breen Oval	Sun 18 Sep 2005	Wyong
2006	10	Kincumber	The Entrance	27–20	Grand Final		Morrie Breen Oval	Sat 30 Sep 2006	The Entrance
2007	10	Kincumber	The Entrance	21–16	Grand Final		Woy Woy Oval	Sun 23 Sep 2007	Kincumber
2008	10	Berkeley Vale	The Entrance	28–16	Grand Final		Bluetounge Stadium	Sun 21 Sep 2008	Berkeley Vale
2009	6			-					
2010	8	Berkeley Vale	Toukley	12–4	Grand Final		EDSACC Oval	Sat 18 Sep 2010	Berkeley Vale
2011	10	Terrigal	The Entrance	28–12	Grand Final		Morrie Breen Oval	Sat 17 Sep 2011	
2013	6	Kincumber	The Entrance	40–10	Grand Final		Morrie Breen Oval	Sat 21 Sep 2013	The Entrance
2014	10	Toukley	Terrigal	14–10	Grand Final		Morrie Breen Oval	Sun 14 Sep 2014	Terrigal
2015	8	Kincumber	Berkeley Vale	28–4	Grand Final		Central Coast Stadium	Sun 13 Sep 2015	Toukley
2016	8	Terrigal	The Entrance Gold	24–22	Grand Final	No	Central Coast Stadium	Sun 11 Sep 2016	The Entrance Gold
2017	10	Wyong	Erina	29–28	Grand Final		Central Coast Stadium	Sun 10 Sep 2017	Erina
2018	7	Ourimbah	Kincumber	20–18	Grand Final		Central Coast Stadium	Sun 9 Sep 2018	Wyong

== Match details ==
1967
WOY WOY 10 (B. McEvoy, Lindsay Makepeace tries; C. Symes goal; C. Symes field goal) defeated WYONG 8 (Mick Leaudais, John Glachan tries; Howard Burns goal) at Grahame Park on Sunday, October 1, 1967.

1979
ERINA 23 (Glen Ritchie, John Harris, Steve Lloyd, Anthony Sopp, Michael McCabe tries; Michael McCabe 4 goals) defeated GOSFORD 12 (Chris Endacott, Shane Rawlings tries; Mark Stevens 3 goals) at Grahame Park on Sunday, September 16, 1979. Referee: Paul Freeman.

1980
ERINA 9 (Michael Stone try; Don Moylan 3 goals) defeated UMINA 6 (Gary Parsons, Dave Campbell tries) at Grahame Park on Sunday, September 14, 1980. Referee: T. Gardiner.

1981
WOY WOY 14 (Eddie Riley and others tries; two unnamed goals; unnamed field goal) defeated WYONG 8 (David Walther, Brett Ackhurst tries; unnamed goal) at Grahame Park on Sunday, September 13, 1981.

1982
WYONG 6 (Shane Khun, Don Murray tries) defeated ERINA 2 (B. Vallance goal) at Grahame Park on Sunday, September 19, 1982. Referee: Chris Cox.

=== 2000s ===
2000
WYONG 32 defeated UMINA 12 at NorthPower Stadium, Grahame Park on Saturday, August 26, 2000.

2001
UMINA 28 (Shane Ngaheu and others tries) defeated THE ENTRANCE 24 at NorthPower Stadium, Grahame Park on Sunday, September 2, 2001.

2002
OURIMBAH 24 (Mitchell Gow 2 and others tries) defeated WYONG 10 at Central Coast Stadium, Grahame Park on Sunday, September 1, 2002.

2003
KINCUMBER 32 defeated WYONG 16 at Central Coast Express Advocate Stadium, Grahame Park on Sunday, August 31, 2003.

2004
BERKELEY VALE 18 defeated ERINA 16 at Central Coast Express Advocate Stadium, Grahame Park on Sunday September 12, 2004.

2005
THE ENTRANCE 24 defeated WYONG 18 at Morrie Breen on Sunday, September 18, 2005.

2006
KINCUMBER 27 (W. Lagudi, M. Kurtz, M. Giffin, J. Kennedy tries; M. Kurtz 3 goals; M. Murray field goal) d THE ENTRANCE 20 (B. Munbro, M. Johnson tries; G. Nelson 3 goals) at Morrie Breen on Saturday, September 30, 2006.

2007
KINCUMBER 21 defeated THE ENTRANCE 16 at Woy Woy Oval on Sunday, September 23, 2007.

2008
BERKELEY VALE 28 defeated THE ENTRANCE 16 at Bluetounge Stadium on Sunday, September 21, 2008.

2009
Six teams participated in the 2009 Under 17 competition – Budgewoi, Kincumber, Ourimbah, Terrigal, The Entrance and Woy Woy. Results were published in the Central Coast Express during June and July, but not in August or September. Consequently, the result is unknown to the author.

=== 2010s ===
2010
BERKELEY VALE 12 defeated TOUKLEY 4 on Saturday, September 18, 2010.

2011
TERRIGAL 28 defeated THE ENTRANCE 12 on Saturday, September 17, 2011.

2013
KINCUMBER 40 (Brodie Cooper 3, Mitchell Clark, Kurt Burrell, Daniel Hutchison, Dane Richter tries; Blake Wylie 6 goals) defeated THE ENTRANCE 10 (Jordan Huckstepp 2 tries; Joshua French goal) at Morrie Breen on Saturday, September 21, 2013.

2014 (CCDJRL)
TOUKLEY 14 (Luke Gearside, Daniel Peck, Cameron Catania tries; Thomas Harvey goal) defeated TERRIGAL-WAMBERAL 10 (Alex Pohla, Daniel Heuston tries; Josh Cook goal) at Morrie Breen Oval on Sunday, September 14, 2014.

2015 (CCDJRL)
KINCUMBER 28 (Jordan Sanchez 2, Jordan Griffin, Benjamin Peters, Tyren Andrea, Jeremy Abdullah tries; Cooper Bosden, Joshua McRohan goals) defeated BERKELEY VALE 4 (Harrison Gibbons try) at Central Coast Stadium, Grahame Park on Sunday, September 13, 2015. Man of the Match - Will Grassby

== Sources ==
- Microfilm of the following newspapers are available at the State Library of New South Wales and Central Coast Council libraries at Gosford and Wyong. The RAV numbers provided are those used by the State Library.

- Central Coast Express (RAV 61)
- Wyong and Lakes District Advocate (RAV 178)
- Wyong Shire Advocate (RAV 824)

- Erina Rugby League Football Club
- Woy Woy Roosters
- Fox Sports Pulse
- The following books are available at the Tuggerah Branch of the Central Coast Council Libraries

- George Glading (1995). History of Wyong Rugby League 1893-1995. Kanwal, New South Wales: Wyong Rugby League Club Limited. ISBN 0-646-25613-0.
- A History of The Entrance Rugby League Football Club - From Seagulls to Tigers 1934 to 2012. Bateau Bay, New South Wales: The Entrance Rugby League Football Club. 2013.
