= List of 2025–26 NRL Women's transfers =

This is a list of player transfers involving NRL Women's Premiership teams before or during the 2026 NRL Women's season.

== Transfers ==
Table last updated: 23 June 2026

2026 NRLW transfers
Player	2025 club	2026 club	Length of deal (years)	Announcement date	Reference
Brooke Anderson	Cronulla-Sutherland Sharks	St George Illawarra Dragons	2	3 Apr 2025	
Ella-Jaye Harrison-Leaunoa	Ipswich Jets (QLD)	Newcastle Knights	3	10 Sep 2025	
Gayle Broughton	Brisbane Broncos	New Zealand Warriors	2	5 Oct 2025	
Keilee Joseph	Brisbane Broncos	Parramatta Eels	2	6 Oct 2025	
Raecene McGregor	St George Illawarra Dragons	Wests Tigers	2	8 Oct 2025	
Mele Hufanga	Brisbane Broncos	New Zealand Warriors	2 (MO for 3)	8 Oct 2025	
Annetta Nu'uausala	Brisbane Broncos	New Zealand Warriors	3	10 Oct 2025	
Jesse Southwell	Newcastle Knights	Brisbane Broncos	2	13 Oct 2025	
Lavinia Kitai	New Zealand Warriors	St George Illawarra Dragons	3	16 Oct 2025	
Lillian Yarrow	North Queensland Cowboys	Brisbane Broncos	2	16 Oct 2025	
Montana Clifford	Wests Tigers	St George Illawarra Dragons	3	17 Oct 2025	
Stacey Waaka	— New Zealand 15s & 7s (Union)	New Zealand Warriors	2	26 Oct 2025	
Kirra Dibb	North Queensland Cowboys	Newcastle Knights	3	29 Oct 2025	
Montaya Hudson	Brisbane Broncos	St George Illawarra Dragons	2	3 Nov 2025	
Taliah Fuimaono	Gold Coast Titans	St George Illawarra Dragons	2	5 Nov 2025	
China Polata	North Queensland Cowboys	Cronulla-Sutherland Sharks	2	7 Nov 2025	
Chelsea Savill	Wests Tigers	St George Illawarra Dragons (Dev)	1	7 Nov 2025	
Namoe Gesa	Brisbane Tigers (QLD)	Wests Tigers	2	21 Nov 2025	
Shaniece Monschau	Canterbury-Bankstown Bulldogs	Wests Tigers	2	21 Nov 2025	
Leah Ollerton	Newcastle Knights	Wests Tigers	2	21 Nov 2025	
Jayde Herdegen	Sydney Roosters	Parramatta Eels	2	21 Nov 2025	
Jasmin Morrissey	Gold Coast Titans (Sup)	Parramatta Eels	2	21 Nov 2025	
Shenai Lendill	St George Illawarra Dragons	Wests Tigers	2	24 Nov 2025	
Holli Wheeler	Canterbury-Bankstown Bulldogs	Wests Tigers	2	24 Nov 2025	
Sian Williams	Northern Pride (QLD)	North Queensland Cowboys	2	26 Nov 2025	
Cheyelle Robins-Reti	Canberra Raiders	Newcastle Knights	1	3 Dec 2025	
Nakia Davis-Welsh	Cronulla-Sutherland Sharks	Newcastle Knights	1	3 Dec 2025	
Sheridan Gallagher	Newcastle Knights	Canberra Raiders	2	8 Dec 2025	
Bobbi Law	St George Illawarra Dragons	Canberra Raiders	2	9 Dec 2025	
Krystal Blackwell	North Queensland Cowboys	Canberra Raiders	2	10 Dec 2025	
Ellie Brander	Sydney Roosters (Dev)	Canberra Raiders	2	11 Dec 2025	
Tegan Dymock	Canterbury-Bankstown Bulldogs	Cronulla-Sutherland Sharks	2	12 Dec 2025	
Eta Sikahele	Gold Coast Titans (Dev)	Gold Coast Titans	2	9 Jan 2026	
Najvada George	North Queensland Cowboys	Cronulla-Sutherland Sharks	1	21 Jan 2026	
Tatum Bird	— NSW Waratahs (Union)	Sydney Roosters	1	23 Jan 2026	
Keighley Simpson	Newcastle Knights	Sydney Roosters (Sup)	1	23 Jan 2026	
Layne Morgan	— Queensland Reds (Union)	Parramatta Eels	2	23 Jan 2026	
Arabella McKenzie	— NSW Waratahs (Union)	St George Illawarra Dragons	1	28 Jan 2026	
Grace Kukutai	Newcastle Knights	Canberra Raiders	2	29 Jan 2026	
Shannon Mato	Gold Coast Titans (Pregnancy)	Brisbane Broncos	2	30 Jan 2026	
Tamika Jones	— Western Force (Union)	Canterbury-Bankstown Bulldogs	1	6 Feb 2026	
Evah McEwen	Newcastle Knights	Canterbury-Bankstown Bulldogs	1	17 Feb 2026	
Daynah Nankivell	— Yokohama TKM (Union)	Canterbury-Bankstown Bulldogs	1	19 Feb 2026	
Amelia Pasikala	Canberra Raiders	Newcastle Knights	2	20 Feb 2026	
Damita Betham	— NSW Waratahs 7s (Sevens)	Newcastle Knights (Sup)	3	20 Feb 2026	
Shenae Ciesiolka	Brisbane Broncos	St George Illawarra Dragons	4	5 Mar 2026	
Indie Bostock	St George Illawarra Dragons	Gold Coast Titans	2	13 Mar 2026	
Shaylee Bent	Gold Coast Titans	Wests Tigers	2	18 Mar 2026	
Lydia Turua-Quedley	New Zealand Warriors	North Queensland Cowboys	2	25 Mar 2026	
Tavarna Papalii	Sydney Roosters	Brisbane Broncos	2	30 Mar 2026	
Evie McGrath	Wests Tigers	Canberra Raiders (Sup)	1	1 Apr 2026	
Lahnayah Daniel	Canterbury-Bankstown Bulldogs (Dev)	Wests Tigers (Dev)	1	20 Apr 2026	
Vasaliva Feleti	Penrith Panthers (Under 17s)	Wests Tigers (Dev)	1	20 Apr 2026	
Diamond Graham	Tweed Heads Seagulls (Under 17s)	Wests Tigers (Dev)	1	20 Apr 2026	
Kayla Henderson	Newcastle Knights (NSW)	Wests Tigers (Dev)	1	20 Apr 2026	
Patricia Heihei	Penrith Panthers (Under 17s)	New Zealand Warriors (Dev)	1	22 Apr 2026	
Gezreyal Maiu’u	St. George Dragons (Under 19s)	New Zealand Warriors (Dev)	1	22 Apr 2026	
Asha Taumoepeau-Williams	Canterbury-Bankstown Bulldogs (Under 17s)	New Zealand Warriors (Dev)	1	22 Apr 2026	
Sienna Thomas	Sydney Roosters (Dev)	Newcastle Knights (Dev)	1	23 Apr 2026	
Jasmin Huriwai	— ACT Brumbies (Union)	New Zealand Warriors	1	24 Apr 2026	
Haylee Hifo	— Western Force (Union)	North Queensland Cowboys	2	30 Apr 2026	
Emily Veivers	Wigan Warriors (ENG)	North Queensland Cowboys	2	30 Apr 2026	
Teagan Levi	— Australia 7s (Sevens)	Gold Coast Titans	1	4 May 2026	
Ashley Marsters	— Western Force (Union)	North Queensland Cowboys	2	6 May 2026	
Sidney Taylor	— Australia 7s (Sevens)	Newcastle Knights	1	8 May 2026	
Charlotte Basham	St George Illawarra Dragons	Canberra Raiders	1	14 May 2026	
Caitlin Urwin	— Queensland Reds (Union)	Brisbane Broncos	1	1 Jun 2026	
Tyla Amiatu	Parramatta Eels	Wests Tigers (Sup)	1	3 Jun 2026	
Harmony Kautai	— Hurricanes Poua (Union)	Wests Tigers (Sup)	1	3 Jun 2026	
Madison Ashby	— Australia 7s (Sevens)	Cronulla-Sutherland Sharks	1	16 Jun 2026	
Breanna Eales	Parramatta Eels	Brisbane Broncos (Dev)	1	17 Jun 2026	
Rhemy Hinckesman	Sunshine Coast Falcons (QLD)	Brisbane Broncos (Sup)	1	17 Jun 2026	
Tia Molo	Dolphins (Under 19s)	Brisbane Broncos (Dev)	1	17 Jun 2026	
Deleni Paitai	Burleigh Bears (QLD)	Brisbane Broncos (Dev)	1	17 Jun 2026	
Lila Parr	Sunshine Coast Falcons (QLD)	Brisbane Broncos (Dev)	1	17 Jun 2026	
Kate Fallon	— Gap Year (Pregnancy)	Parramatta Eels	1	17 Jun 2026	
Sariah Paki	— Australia 7s (Union)	Sydney Roosters	1	19 Jun 2026	

== Brisbane Broncos ==
=== Players in ===
- Jesse Southwell from Knights
- Lillian Yarrow from Cowboys
- Shannon Mato from Titans
- Tavarna Papalii from Roosters
- Caitlin Urwin from Qld Reds (Union)
- Breanna Eales (Dev) from Eels
- Rhemy Hinckesman (Sup) from Falcons (QLD)
- Tia Molo (Dev) from Dolphins (Under 19s)
- Deleni Paitai (Dev) from Bears (QLD)
- Lila Parr (Dev) from Falcons (QLD)

=== Players extended ===
- Amanii Misa (2026)
- Ali Brigginshaw (2026)
- Lauren Dam (2027)
- Brianna Clark (2027)
- Bree Spreadborough (2027)
- Destiny Brill (2027)
- Shalom Sauaso (2027)
- Reegan Hicks (2027)
- Georgia Bartlett (2027)

Unavailable for 2026

- Hayley Maddick

=== Players out ===
- Gayle Broughton (13) to Warriors
- Keilee Joseph (13) to Eels
- Mele Hufanga (13) to Warriors
- Annetta-Claudia Nu’uausala (11) to Warriors
- Shenae Ciesiolka (8) to Dragons
- Montaya Hudson (7) to Dragons

Released

- Lavinia Gould (0)
- Shaylee Joseph (0)
- Tafito Lafaele (1)

== Canberra Raiders ==
=== Players in ===
- Sheridan Gallagher from Knights
- Bobbi Law from Dragons
- Krystal Blackwell from Cowboys
- Ellie Brander from Roosters (Dev)
- Grace Kukutai from Knights
- Evie McGrath (Sup) from Tigers
- Charlotte Basham from St George Illawarra Dragons

Promotions

- Aaliyah Lomas (Sup) from West Belconnen
- Gabriella Savage (Dev) Under 19 2025 & 2026
- Isabella Piper (Dev) Under 19 2025 & 2026

=== Players extended ===
- Emma Barnes (2026)
- Madyson Tooth (2026)
- Jordyn Preston (2027)'
- Isabella Waterman (2027)'

Continued development

- Marley Cardwell (Dev) (NSW)

=== Players out ===
Released

- Cheyelle Robins-Reti (10)
- Kerehitina Matua (4)
- Ua Ravu (0)
- Jaida Faleono (0)
- Tatiana Finau (8)
- Claudia Finau (0)
- Georgia Thomas (3)

Off contract

- Amelia Pasikala

== Canterbury-Bankstown Bulldogs ==
=== Players in ===
- Tamika Jones from Force (RU)
- Evah McEwen from Knights
- Daynah Nankivell from Blues (RU)

Promotions

- Waimarie Martin from 2025 (Dev) Reserves, 2024 Reserves
- Mary-Jane Taito from 2026 U19, 2025 U19
- Leilani Wilson (Sup) from 2025 (Dev) Reserves
- Giovanna Suani (Sup) from 2026 U19, 2025 U17
- Aliahana Fuimaono (Dev) from 2026 U19, 2025 Reserves
- Leteena Medland (Dev) from 2026 U19, 2025 U17
- Milahn Ieremia (Dev) from 2025 Reserves & U19
- Olivia Va'alele (Dev) from 2026 U19, 2025 Reserves & U19

=== Players extended ===
- Hope Millard (2026)
- Monica Tagoai (2026)
- Moana Courtenay (2027)
- Simina Lokotui (2027)
- Tayla Preston (2028)

=== Players out ===
- Shaniece Monschau (11) to Tigers
- Holli Wheeler (9) to Tigers
- Tegan Dymock (5) to Cronulla Sharks
- Adi Vani Buleki (6) to Western Force (RU)

Off contract

- Anneka Wilson (9)
- Sarahcen Oliver (0)
- Shannon Muru (10)

2027

- Alexis Tauaneai to Dragons
- Angelina Teakaraanga-Katoa to Dragons

== Cronulla-Sutherland Sharks ==
=== Players in ===
- Tegan Dymock from Bulldogs
- Najvada George from Cowboys
- China Polata from Cowboys
- Milla Elaro from NSW Waratahs 7s (Sevens)
- Leilani Ahsam (Sup) from Knights
- Madison Ashby from Australia 7s (Sevens)

Promotions

- Koffi Brookfield (Dev) from 2026 U19, 2025 Reserves & U19
- Genevieve Mafi (Dev) from 2026 U19, 2025 Reserves & U19
- Marewa Samson (Dev) from 2025 Reserves

=== Players extended ===
- Cassie Staples (2026)
- Tiana Penitani-Gray (2027)
- Quincy Dodd (2027)
- Jada Taylor (2027)
- Stephanie Faulkner (2027)
- Anne-Marie Kiria-Ratu (2027)
- Filomina Hanisi (2027)
- Georgia Hannaway (2027)
- Ellie Johnston (2027)

Continued development

- Olivia Herman (Dev) from 2025 (Dev) Reserves, 2024 Reserves & U19

=== Players out ===
- Brooke Anderson to Dragons
- Nakia Davis-Welsh to Knights

Off contract

- Tia-Jordyn Vasilovski

2027

- Emma Verran to Dragons

== Gold Coast Titans ==
=== Players in ===
- Indie Bostock from Dragons
- Te Ngaroahiahi Fanua Awhina Rimoni from Norths Devils
- Teagan Levi from rugby sevens

=== Players extended ===
- Georgia Grey (2026)
- Lailani Montgomery (2026)
- Pauline Piliae-Rasabale (2026)
- Lauren Brown (2027)
- Jaime Chapman (2027)
- Phoenix-Raine Hippi (2027)
- Ivana Lolesio (2027)
- Sarina Masaga (2027)
- Lily Kolc (2027)
- Georgia Hale (2028)
- Jessika Elliston (2028)
- Sienna Lofipo (2028)

=== Players out ===
- Taliah Fuimaono to Dragons
- Jasmin Morrissey to Eels
- Shaylee Bent to Tigers
- Megan Pakulis to York Valkyrie
- Shannon Mato to Broncos

Off contract

- Brittany Breayley-Nati
- Dannii Perese
- Estanoa Faitala-Mariner
- Jayda Lofipo
- Kelsey Parkin
- Ngatokotoru Arakua

== Newcastle Knights ==
=== Players in ===
- Ella-Jaye Harrison-Leaunoa from Ipswich Jets
- Kirra Dibb from Cowboys
- Nakia Davis-Welsh from Cronulla Sharks
- Cheyelle Robins-Reti from Raiders
- Amelia Pasikala from Raiders
- Damita Betham from NSW Waratahs 7s (Sevens)
- Sienna Thomas (Dev) from Roosters (Dev)
- Sidney Taylor from Australia 7s (Sevens)

Promotions

- Stella Lewis from 2026 U19, 2025 U19
- Lucy Spain (Dev) from 2025 Reserves, 2024 Reserves

2027

- Tori Shipton from Dragons

=== Players extended ===
- Olivia Higgins (2026) (activated mutual option)
- Jules Kirkpatrick (2027)
- Lilly-Ann White (2027)
- Sienna Yeo (2027)
- Grace Giampino (2028)
- Tayla Predebon (2028)
- Kayla Romaniuk (2028)
- Tiana Davison (2029)

Continued development

- Mariah Brown (Dev) from 2025 (Dev) Reserves & U19
- Emily McArthur (Dev) from 2026 U19, 2025 (Dev) Reserves

=== Players out ===
- Jesse Southwell (13) to Broncos
- Sheridan Gallagher (13) to Raiders
- Grace Kukutai (0) to Raiders
- Leah Ollerton (0) to Tigers
- Keighley Simpson (3) to Roosters
- Evah McEwen (9) to Bulldogs

Released

- Leilani Ah Sam (0)
- Viena Tinao (5)

== New Zealand Warriors ==
=== Players in ===
- Gayle Broughton from Broncos
- Annetta-Claudia Nu’uausala from Broncos
- Mele Hufanga from Broncos
- Stacey Waaka from rugby union
- Jasmin Huriwai from rugby union
- Natalia Hickling from Tweed Heads Seagulls

=== Players extended ===
- Metanoia Fotu-Moala (2026) (club option for 2027)
- Patricia Maliepo (2026)
- Kaiyah Atai (2027)
- Ivana Lauitiiti (2027)
- Maarire Puketapu (2027)
- Note: Felila Kia and Tyra Watere are contracted for 2026 but have signed with the Catalans Dragons for a stint in the French domestic competition in the off season. Both will return to the club for preseason in May.

=== Players out ===
- Lavinia Kitai to Dragons
- Lydia Turua-Quedley (11) to Cowboys

Released

- Avery-Rose Carmont (4)
- Emily Curtain (5)
- Makayla Eli (3)
- Kalyn Takitimu-Cook (2)
- Sharnyze Pihema (0) (development)

== North Queensland ==
=== Players in ===
- Lydia Turua-Quedley (Warriors)
- Emily Veivers (Wigan)
- Hayley Hifo (Super W rugby)
- Ashley Marsters (Super W rugby)

=== Players extended ===
- Tallisha Harden (2026)
- Tafao Asaua (2026)
- Hailee-Jay Ormond-Maunsell (2026)
- Makenzie Weale (2027)
- Tiana Raftstrand-Smith (2027)
- Ebony Raftstrand-Smith (2027)
- Francesca Goldthorp (2027)
- Tayla Curtis (2027)
- Essay Banu (2028)
- Ana Malupo (2028)
- Bree Chester (2028)
- Alisha Foord

Unavailable for 2026

- Jakiya Whitfeld

=== Players out ===
- Lillian Yarrow to Broncos
- Krystal Blackwell to Raiders
- Kirra Dibb to Knights
- China Polata to Cronulla Sharks
- Najvada George to Cronulla Sharks

Released

- Caitlan Tanner (0) (development)
- Autumn-Rain Stephens-Daly (0) (development)

Retired

- Tahlulah Tillett

Off contract

- Emily Bella

== Parramatta Eels ==
=== Players in ===
- Keilee Joseph from Eels
- Jayde Herdegen from Roosters
- Jasmin Morrissey from Titans
- Layne Morgan from Rugby union

=== Players extended ===
- Breanna Eales (2026)
- Rueben Cherrington (2026)
- Kiana Takairangi (2026)
- Rory Owen (2027)
- Fleur Ginn (2027)
- Chloe Jackson (2027)
- Mahalia Murphy (2027)
- Rachael Pearson (2027)
- Tess McWilliams (2027)
- Kennedy Cherrington (2027)
- Lindsay Tui (2027)
- Elsie Albert (2027)
- Cassey Tohi-Hiku (2028)
- Fontayne Tufuga (2028)
- Abbi Church (2028)
- Kiana Takairangi (2) Supplementary list

=== Players out ===
- Paige Travis (11) to Wigan Warriors

Released

- Tyla Amiatu (1)
- Yasmine Baker (0)
- Rysh'e Fa'amausili (2)
- Ruby-Jean Kennard-Ellis (1)
- Jessica Kennedy (0)
- Chelsea Makira (0)
- Mia Middleton (2)
- Madeline Jones (0)

== St. George Illawarra Dragons ==
=== Players in ===
- Brooke Anderson from Cronulla Sharks
- Lavinia Kitai from Warriors
- Montana Clifford from Tigers
- Montaya Hudson from Broncos
- Taliah Fuimaono from Titans
- Chelsea Savill from Tigers
- Arabella McKenzie from Wallaroos Rugby Union
- Shenae Ciesiolka from Broncos

2027

- Emma Verran from Cronulla Sharks
- Alexis Tauaneai from Bulldogs
- Angelina Teakaraanga-Katoa (Bulldogs) from Bulldogs

=== Players extended ===
- Ahlivia Ingram (2026)
- Sara Sautia (2026)
- Jayme Millard (2026)
- Ella Koster (2027)
- Zali Hopkins (2027)
- Bronte Wilson (2027)
- Kasey Reh (2027)
- Hannah Southwell (2027)
- Tahlia O'Brien (2027)
- Trinity Tauaneai (2028)
- Madison Mulhall (2027)

=== Players out ===
- Raecene McGregor to Tigers
- Shenai Lendill (11) to Tigers
- Bobbi Law (2) to Raiders
- Indie Bostock to Titans
- Charlotte Basham to Raiders

Released

- Alice Gregory (2)
- Jamilee McGregor (4)
- Sophie Clancy (0)
- Pia Tapsell (5)
- Grace Hamilton (0)
- Margot Vella (5)

2027

- Tori Shipton (Knights)
- Teagan Berry (TBC)

== Sydney Roosters ==
=== Players in ===
- Tatum Bird from NSW Waratahs Rugby Union
- Keighley Simpson from Knights4
- Sariah Paki from NSW Waratahs Rugby Union

=== Players extended ===
- Keeley Davis (2026)
- Amber Hall (2026)
- Macie Carlile (2027)
- Taina Naividi (2027)
- Aliyah Nasio (2027)
- Olivia Kernick (2027)
- Shawden Burton (2027)

=== Players out ===
- Jayde Herdegen to Eels
- Ellie Brander to Raiders
- Tavarna Papalii from Broncos

Off contract

- Imogen Hei

== Wests Tigers ==
=== Players in ===
- Raecene McGregor from Dragons
- Shaniece Monschau from Bulldogs
- Namoe Gesa from Brisbane Tigers (Qld)
- Leah Ollerton from Knights
- Holli Wheeler from Bulldogs
- Shenae Lendill from Dragons
- Shaylee Bent from Titans

=== Players extended ===
- Portia Bourke (2026)
- Harmony Crichton (2026)
- Pihuka Berryman-Duff (2026)
- Terina Te Tamaki (2026)
- Christian Pio (2027)
- Emily Bass (2027)
- Rikeya Horne (2027)
- Lucyannah Luamanu-Leiataua (2027)
- Tara Reinke (2027)
- Sarah Togatuki (2028)
- Caitlin Turnbull (2029)
- Kezie Apps (2029)

Unavailable for 2026

- Jade Fonua
- Pihuka Berryman-Duff

=== Players out ===
- Montana Clifford (7) to Dragons
- Chelsea Savill (6) to Dragons
- Evie McGrath (6) to Raiders

Released

- Claudia Brown (0)
- Iemaima Etuale (5)
- Amelia Huakau (11)
- Claudia Nielsen (1)
- Salma Nour (7)
- Rebecca Pollard (0)
- Jessikah Reeves (3))
- Tiana-Lee Thorne (1)
- Tallara Bamblett (0) (development)
- Aaliyah Bula (0) (development)
- Tiresa Leasuasu (0) (development)

== Off contract ==
List of players from the previous, 2025 NRLW season, who have not received an NRLW contract in 2026. Some are known to be playing rugby union or in the second-tier women's rugby league competitions - the NSWRL Women's Premiership or the QRL Women's Premiership.

Player	2025 club	2026 (non-NRLW)		Reference
Player	2025 club	Competition	Club	Reference
Lavinia Gould	Brisbane Broncos (Sup)	QLD	Brisbane Tigers	
Shaylee Joseph	Brisbane Broncos (Sup)	QLD	Wynnum Manly Seagulls	
Georgia Thomas	Canberra Raiders			
Tatiana Finau	Canberra Raiders	QLD	Ipswich Jets	
Adi Vani Buleki	Canterbury-Bankstown Bulldogs	Union	— Western Force	
Anneka Wilson	Canterbury-Bankstown Bulldogs			
Sarahcen Oliver	Canterbury-Bankstown Bulldogs			
Shannon Muru	Canterbury-Bankstown Bulldogs	QLD	Burleigh Bears	
Dominique du Toit	Cronulla-Sutherland Sharks			
Tommaya Kelly-Sines	Cronulla-Sutherland Sharks	QLD	Mackay	
Brittany Breayley-Nati	Gold Coast Titans	QLD	Souths Logan Magpies	
Dannii Perese	Gold Coast Titans			
Estanoa Faitala-Mariner	Gold Coast Titans (Dev)	QLD	Brisbane Tigers	
Jayda Lofipo	Gold Coast Titans	QLD	Wynnum Manly Seagulls	
Ngatokotoru Arakua	Gold Coast Titans	QLD	Souths Logan Magpies	
Kelsey Parkin	Gold Coast Titans (Sup)	QLD	Brisbane Tigers	
Viena Tinao	Newcastle Knights	NSW	Penrith Panthers	
Emily Bella	North Queensland Cowboys	QLD	Mackay	
Chelsea Makira	Parramatta Eels			
Mia Middleton	Parramatta Eels			
Ruby-Jean Kennard-Ellis	Parramatta Eels	NSW	St. George Dragons	
Yasmine Baker	Parramatta Eels	NSW	Penrith Panthers	
Alice Gregory	St George Illawarra Dragons			
Grace Hamilton	St George Illawarra Dragons			
Margot Vella	St George Illawarra Dragons	NSW	Cronulla-Sutherland Sharks	
Pia Tapsell	St George Illawarra Dragons	Union	— Western Force	
Sophie Clancy	St George Illawarra Dragons			
Jamilee McGregor	St George Illawarra Dragons			
Imogen Hei	Sydney Roosters			
Avery-Rose Carmont	New Zealand Warriors	QLD	Wynnum Manly Seagulls	
Emily Curtain	New Zealand Warriors	NSW	South Sydney Rabbitohs	
Kalyn Takitimu-Cook	New Zealand Warriors			
Paris Pickering	New Zealand Warriors (Sup)			
Amelia Huakau	Wests Tigers	NSW	St. George Dragons	
Ruby Fifita	Wests Tigers (Sup)	QLD	Burleigh Bears	
Maddie Studdon	St George Illawarra Dragons (Sup)	QLD	Sunshine Coast Falcons	
Autumn-Rain Stephens-Daly	North Queensland Cowboys (Sup)	QLD	Northern Pride	
Paige Travis	Parramatta Eels	ENG	St Helens R.F.C. Women	
Megan Pakulis	Gold Coast Titans	ENG	York Valkyrie	
Tia-Jordyn Vasilovski	Cronulla-Sutherland Sharks (Dev)	NSW	Wests Tigers	
Ua Ravu	Canberra Raiders	NSW	South Sydney Rabbitohs	
Claudia Brown	Wests Tigers	NSW	South Sydney Rabbitohs	
Claudia Nielsen	Wests Tigers	NSW	South Sydney Rabbitohs	
Caitlin Tanner	North Queensland Cowboys (Dev)	QLD	Wynnum Manly Seagulls	
Jaida Faleono	Canberra Raiders	NSW	Illawarra Steelers	
Claudia Finau	Canberra Raiders	QLD	Ipswich Jets	
Tiresa Leasuasu	Wests Tigers (Dev)	QLD	Ipswich Jets	

== Players off contract after 2026 ==
The following players are off contract with their current club at the end of the 2026 NRLW season.

Brisbane Broncos

- Azalleyah Maaka
- Hayley Maddick
- Jada Ferguson
- Kerri Johnson
- Lauren Dam
- Tara McGrath-West

Canberra Raiders

- Chante Temara
- Elise Simpson
- Hollie-Mae Dodd
- Lili Boyle
- Mackenzie Wiki
- Monalisa Soliola
- Sereana Naitokatoka
- Zahara Temara

Canterbury-Bankstown Bulldogs

- Alexis Tauaneai
- Andie Robinson
- Angelina Teakaaranga-Katoa
- Ashleigh Quinlan
- Bridget Hoy
- Ebony Prior
- Kalosipani Hopoate
- Latisha Smythe
- Maatuleio Fotu-Moala
- Paea Uilou
- Shaquaylah Mahakitau-Monschau
- Tayla Preston
- Tegan Dymock

Cronulla Sharks

- Cassie Staples
- Ellie Johnston
- Emma Verran
- Filomina Hanisi
- Georgia Hannaway
- Georgia Ravics
- Jacinta Carter
- Koreti Leilua
- Talei Holmes
- Tyla King

Gold Coast Titans

- Destiny Mino-Sinapati
- Georgia Grey
- Georgia Hale
- Jasmine Fogavini
- Lailani Montgomery
- Laikha Clarke
- Sienna Lofipo
- Takoda Thompson

Newcastle Knights

- Joeli Morris
- Kayla Romaniuk
- Olivia Higgins
- Tayla Predebon

New Zealand Warriors

- Apii Nicholls
- Capri Paekau
- Emmanita Paki
- Felila Kia
- Harata Butler
- Laishon Albert-Jones
- Lavinia Tauhalahiku
- Matekino Gray
- Patricia Maliepo
- Payton Takimoana
- Tyra Watere

North Queensland Cowboys

- Bree Chester
- Tallisha Harden
- Lily Dick

Parramatta Eels

- Breanna Eales
- Fleur Ginn
- Martha Mataele
- Rory Owen
- Rosemarie Beckett
- Rueben Cherrington
- Taneka Todhunter
- Zali Fay

St George Illawarra Dragons

- Ahlivia Ingram
- Charlotte Basham
- Hannah Southwell
- Nita Maynard-Perrin
- Sara Sautia
- Teagan Berry
- Arabella McKenzie

Sydney Roosters

- Amber Hall
- Isabelle Kelly
- Jasmin Strange
- Keeley Davis
- Mia Wood
- Millie Elliott
- Otesa Pule
- Rima Butler
- Taneisha Gray
- Tavarna Papalii

Wests Tigers

- Faythe Manera
- Lily Rogan
- Losana Lutu
- Portia Bourke

== 2026–27 transfers ==
Table last updated: 9 September 2026

2027 NRLW transfers
Player	2026 club	2027 club	Length of deal (years)	Announcement date	Reference
Tori Shipton	St George Illawarra Dragons	Newcastle Knights	2	15 Jan 2026	
Emma Verran	Cronulla Sharks	St George Illawarra Dragons	3	12 Feb 2026	
Alexis Tauaneai	Canterbury-Bankstown Bulldogs	St. George Illawarra Dragons	2	19 Mar 2026	
Angelina Teakaaranga-Katoa	Canterbury-Bankstown Bulldogs	St. George Illawarra Dragons	2	20 Mar 2026	
Destiny Mino-Sinapati	Gold Coast Titans	Brisbane Broncos	2	7 Aug 2026	
Teagan Berry	St George Illawarra Dragons	To be advised	TBA	18 Jun 2026	

== Key to acronyms and abbreviations used above ==
- (CO) - Club option
- (MO) - Mutual option
- (PO) - Player option
- Numbers in parentheses alongside a player's name are the number of NRLW games played in the 2025 season.
- Dev - Development contract
- Sup - Supplementary contract
- NSW - The NSWRL Harvey Norman Women's Premiership, a second-tier or reserve grade competition that sits below the NRLW in New South Wales
  - The Canberra Raiders Women have a pathways arrangement with NSWRL Harvey Norman Women's Premiership club, Mounties.
  - From the 2026 season, the New Zealand Warriors Women have a pathways arrangement with NSWRL Harvey Norman Women's Premiership club, South Sydney Rabbitohs.
- QLD - The QRL BMD Women's Premiership, a second-tier or reserve grade competition that sits below the NRLW in Queensland
- Under 19
  - The Tarsha Gale Cup in New South Wales and Australian Capital Territory
  - The Harvey Norman U19s in Queensland
- Under 17
  - The Lisa Fiaola Cup in New South Wales and Australian Capital Territory
  - The Harvey Norman U17s in Queensland
- Union - Rugby union
  - Super Rugby Pacific (Australia and Fiji)
  - Super Rugby Aupiki (New Zealand)
  - Women's Rugby World Cup
- Sevens - Rugby union sevens
  - International sevens
  - NextGen Sevens tournament in Australia for development players
