= List of Parramatta Eels representatives =

Including players from the Parramatta Eels and Parramatta Eels Women that have represented while at the club and the years they achieved their honours, if known. Representatives from the Wentworthville Magpies and Cabramatta Two-Blues are included as they are feeder clubs.

== International ==
=== Australia ===
- (Australia) Ian Johnston (1949)
- (Australia) Harold Crocker (1954–55)
- (Australia) Ron Boden (1960)
- (Australia) Bill Rayner (1960)
- (Australia) Ron Lynch (1961–62, 1966–67, 1970)
- (Australia) Brian Hambly (1963–65)
- (Australia) Ken Thornett (1963–64)
- (Australia) Dick Thornett (1963–64, 1966, 1968)
- (Australia) Barry Rushworth (1964)
- (Australia) Bob O'Reilly (1970–74)
- (Australia) Keith Campbell (1971)
- (Australia) Ray Higgs (1975, 1977)
- (Australia) Denis Fitzgerald (1975, 1977)
- (Australia) John Quayle (1975)
- (Australia) Jim Porter (1975)
- (Australia) Michael Cronin (1977–82)
- (Australia) John Peard (1977)
- (Australia) John Kolc (1977)
- (Australia) Graham Olling (1978)
- (Australia) Ray Price (1978–84)
- (Australia) Neville Glover (1978)
- (Australia) Geoff Gerard (1978)
- (Australia) Ron Hilditch (1978, 1981)
- (Australia) Garry Dowling (1980)
- (Australia) John Muggleton (1982)
- (Australia) Brett Kenny (1982, 1984, 1986–87)
- (Australia) Steve Ella (1982–83, 1985)
- (Australia) Eric Grothe, Sr. (1982–84)
- (Australia) Peter Sterling (1982–83, 1986–88)
- (Australia) Peter Wynn (1985)
- (Australia) Bob Lindner (1987–88)
- (Australia) Jim Dymock (1996)
- (Australia) John Simon (1997)
- (Australia) Dean Pay (1998)
- (Australia) Jason Smith (1998–00)
- (Australia) Michael Vella (1999-01)
- (Australia) Nathan Hindmarsh (2000, 2004–07, 2009)
- (Australia) Jamie Lyon (2001, 2003)
- (Australia) Timana Tahu (2005–06)
- (Australia) Eric Grothe, Jr. (2005)
- (Australia) Jarryd Hayne (2007, 2009–10, 2013–14)
- (Australia) Semi Radradra (2016)
- (Australia) Reagan Campbell-Gillard (2022)
- (Australia) Mitchell Moses (2024)
- (Australia) Josh Addo-Carr (2025)

=== New Zealand ===
- (New Zealand) Mark Horo (1990)
- (New Zealand) Jarrod McCracken (1998–99)
- (New Zealand) Nathan Cayless (1998-01, 2003–08)
- (New Zealand) David Kidwell (1999–00)
- (New Zealand) David Vaealiki (2000–03)
- (New Zealand) David Solomona (2001–02)
- (New Zealand) Krisnan Inu (2007–08)
- (New Zealand) Fuifui Moimoi (2007, 2009, 2011)
- (New Zealand) Manu Ma'u (2016)
- (New Zealand) Brad Takairangi (2017)
- (New Zealand) Marata Niukore (2022)
- (New Zealand) Dylan Brown (2022–23, 2025)
- (New Zealand) Isaiah Papali'i (2022)

=== Rest Of The World ===
- (New Zealand) Jarrod McCracken (1997)

=== Ireland ===
- (Ireland) Apirana Pewhairangi (2013)

=== Italy ===
- (Italy) Dean Parata (2013)
- (Italy) Nathan Brown (2017, 2022)
- (Italy) Daniel Alvaro (2017)
- (Italy) Nick Okladnikov (2018)
- (Italy) Luca Moretti (2022)
- (Italy) Jack Colovatti (2022)

=== Lebanon ===
- (Lebanon) Mark Daoud (2014)
- (Lebanon) Tim Mannah (2017)
- (Lebanon) Mitch Moses (2017, 2022)
- (Lebanon) Anthony Layoun (2017)
- (Lebanon) Elie El-Zakhem (2022)
- (Lebanon) Jabriel Kalache (2022)

=== Scotland ===
- (Scotland) Luke Bain (2022)

=== Papua New Guinea ===
- (Papua New Guinea) Kevin Prior (2007–08)
- (Papua New Guinea) Richard Kambo (2009)

=== Cook Islands ===
- (Cook Islands) Marata Niukore (2017, 2019)
- (Cook Islands) Brad Takairangi (2019)
- (Cook Islands) Tepai Moeroa (2019)
- (Cook Islands) Makahesi Makatoa (2022–24)

=== Fiji ===
- (Fiji) Kaleveti Naisoro (1995)
- (Fiji) Jarryd Hayne (2008, 2018)
- (Fiji) Lepani Waqa (2009)
- (Fiji) Donas Gock (2009-2011)
- (Fiji) Semi Radradra (2013–14)
- (Fiji) Fabian Goodall (2014–15)
- (Fiji) Salesi Faingaa (2017)
- (Fiji) Kane Evans (2018–19)
- (Fiji) Maika Sivo (2019, 2022–24)
- (Fiji) Waqa Blake (2022–23)
- (Fiji) Kitione Kautoga (2025)

=== Samoa ===
- (Samoa) Ben Roberts (2013)
- (Samoa) Reni Maitua (2013)
- (Samoa) Kaysa Pritchard (2016–17)
- (Samoa) Junior Paulo (2016, 2019, 2022–2023, 2025)
- (Samoa) Suaia Matagi (2017)
- (Samoa) Frank Pritchard (2017)
- (Samoa) Oregon Kaufusi (2022)
- (Samoa) Daejarn Asi (2023)
- (Samoa) Blaize Talagi (2024)
- (Samoa) Jake Tago (2024)

=== Tonga ===
- (Tonga) Phil Howlett (1995)
- (Tonga) Feleti Mateo (2006, 2008–10)
- (Tonga) Etu Uaisele (2006, 2008-09)
- (Tonga) Fuifui Moimoi (2006, 2013)
- (Tonga) Tony Williams (2008)
- (Tonga) Taniela Lasalo (2008)
- (Tonga) Kim Uasi (2009)
- (Tonga) Peni Terepo (2013–19)
- (Tonga) Vai Toutai (2014, 2016)
- (Tonga) John Folau (2014)
- (Tonga) Richard Fa'aoso (2015)
- (Tonga) Manu Ma'u (2015, 2017–19)
- (Tonga) Siosaia Vave (2017)
- (Tonga) Michael Jennings (2017–19)
- (Tonga) Will Penisini (2022–23)
- (Tonga) Isaiah Iongi (2025)

=== United States ===
- (United States) Matthew Petersen (2004)
- (United States) Joseph Paulo (2010–13)
- (United States) Bureta Faraimo (2013)

=== Australia Women's ===
- (Australia) Simaima Taufa (2022)
- (Australia) Kennedy Cherrington (2022–23)
- (Australia) Mahalia Murphy (2024)

=== New Zealand Women's ===
- (New Zealand) Capri Paekau (2023)

=== Samoa Women's ===
- (Samoa) Lindsay Tui (2023–25)
- (Samoa) Pihuka Berryman-Duff (2023–24)
- (Samoa) Tafao Asaua (2023)
- (Samoa) Ryvrr-Lee Alo (2025)

=== Tonga Women's ===
- (Tonga) Cassey Tohi-Hiku (2023–24)
- (Tonga) Amelia Mafi (2023)
- (Tonga) Jade Fonua (2023–24)
- (Tonga) Shannon Muru (2023)
- (Tonga) Kate Fallon (2024)
- (Tonga) Martha Mataele (2025)

=== Papua New Guinea Women's ===
- (Papua New Guinea) Elsie Albert (2024–25)
- (Papua New Guinea) Fleur Ginn (2025)

=== Cook Islands Women's ===
- (Cook Islands) Chelsea Makira (2024)
- (Cook Islands) Tahleisha Maeva (2024)
- (Cook Islands) Ryvrr-Lee Alo (2024)
- (Cook Islands) Kiana Takairangi (2025)

== State Of Origin ==
=== New South Wales ===
- (New South Wales) Geoff Gerard (1979–80)
- (New South Wales) Michael Cronin (1980–83)
- (New South Wales) Steve Edge (1980)
- (New South Wales) Ray Price (1981–84)
- (New South Wales) Ron Hilditch (1981)
- (New South Wales) Eric Grothe, Sr. (1981–86)
- (New South Wales) Peter Sterling (1981–88)
- (New South Wales) John Muggleton (1982)
- (New South Wales) Brett Kenny (1982–87)
- (New South Wales) Steve Ella (1983–85)
- (New South Wales) Geoff Bugden (1983)
- (New South Wales) Neil Hunt (1983)
- (New South Wales) Stan Jurd (1983)
- (New South Wales) Peter Wynn (1984–85)
- (New South Wales) Jim Dymock (1996–98)
- (New South Wales) Dean Pay (1996–98)
- (New South Wales) John Simon (1997)
- (New South Wales) Michael Vella (1999–02)
- (New South Wales) Nathan Hindmarsh (2001–10)
- (New South Wales) Andrew Ryan (2001)
- (New South Wales) Jamie Lyon (2002–03)
- (New South Wales) Jason Moodie (2002)
- (New South Wales) Brett Hodgson (2002)
- (New South Wales) Timana Tahu (2005–10)
- (New South Wales) Eric Grothe, Jr. (2006)
- (New South Wales) Jarryd Hayne (2007–13)
- (New South Wales) Tim Mannah (2010–11)
- (New South Wales) Will Hopoate (2014–15)
- (New South Wales) Michael Jennings (2016)
- (New South Wales) Blake Ferguson (2019)
- (New South Wales) Clinton Gutherson (2020, 2023)
- (New South Wales) Junior Paulo (2020–23)
- (New South Wales) Nathan Brown (2020)
- (New South Wales) Mitchell Moses (2021, 2023-26)
- (New South Wales) Reagan Campbell-Gillard (2022-23)
- (New South Wales) Ryan Matterson (2022)
- (New South Wales) Zac Lomax (2025)

=== Queensland ===
- (Queensland) Arthur Beetson (1980)
- (Queensland) Chris Phelan (1983–84)
- (Queensland) Bob Lindner (1987–88)
- (Queensland) Jason Smith (1996–00)
- (Queensland) Stuart Kelly (1997)
- (Queensland) Daniel Wagon (2001)
- (Queensland) J'maine Hopgood (2024)

=== New South Wales Women ===
- (New South Wales) Tiana Penitani (2022)
- (New South Wales) Simaima Taufa (2022)
- (New South Wales) Rachael Pearson (2023-24)
- (New South Wales) Kennedy Cherrington (2023, 2025–26)
- (New South Wales) Abbi Church (2025–26)

=== Queensland ===
- (Queensland) Rory Owen (2025–26)

== All Stars Game ==
=== NRL/World All Stars ===
- (Australia) Jarryd Hayne (2010, 2013)
- (Australia) Nathan Hindmarsh (2011–12)
- (Samoa) Joseph Paulo (2015)
- (Fiji) Semi Radradra (2016)
- (Australia) Beau Scott (2016)
- (Cook Islands) Tepai Moeroa (2017)

=== Indigenous All Stars ===
- Carl Webb (2011)
- Anthony Mitchell (2011)
- Chris Sandow (2012)
- Bevan French (2017, 19)
- Blake Ferguson (2019–21)
- J'maine Hopgood (2023-24)

=== Māori All Stars ===
- (Māori people) Brad Takairangi (2019–20)
- (Māori people) Wiremu Greig (2022)

=== Indigenous Women's ===
- Tommaya Kelly-Sines (2022)
- Monique Donovan (2024)
- Taneka Todhunter (2024–25)
- Mahalia Murphy (2024–26)

=== Māori Women's ===
- (Māori people) Botille Vette-Welsh (2022)
- (Māori people) Jocephy Daniels (2022)
- (Māori people) Nita Maynard (2022)
- (Māori people) Kennedy Cherrington (2022–26)
- (Māori people) Brooke Anderson (2023)
- (Māori people) Gayle Broughton (2023)
- (Māori people) Zali Fay (2023–26)
- (Māori people) Ashleigh Quinlan (2023)
- (Māori people) Rueben Cherrington (2025–26)

== City Vs Country Origin ==
=== NSW City ===
- (New South Wales) Brett Kenny (1987)
- (New South Wales) Eric Grothe, Sr. (1987)
- (New South Wales) Dallas Weston (1993)
- (New South Wales) Aaron Raper (1996)
- (New South Wales) Jim Dymock (1997)
- (New South Wales) Brett Hodgson (2001-02)
- (New South Wales) Brad Drew (2001)
- (New South Wales) Jason Cayless (2001)
- (New South Wales) Eric Grothe, Jr. (2005)
- (New South Wales) Mark Riddell (2005)
- (New South Wales) Jarryd Hayne (2007–09, 2011-12)
- (New South Wales) Chad Robinson (2008)
- (New South Wales) Feleti Mateo (2008)
- (New South Wales) Kris Keating (2010)
- (New South Wales) Joel Reddy (2010)
- (New South Wales) Tim Mannah (2010-13)
- (New South Wales) Shane Shackleton (2011)
- (New South Wales) Mitchell Allgood (2012)
- (New South Wales) William Hopoate (2014)
- (New South Wales) Darcy Lussick (2014)
- (New South Wales) Nathan Peats (2015–16)
- (New South Wales) Joseph Paulo (2015)
- (New South Wales) Clinton Gutherson (2016–17)
- (New South Wales) David Gower (2017)

=== NSW Country ===
- (New South Wales) Mark Laurie (1987, 1990)
- (New South Wales) Peter Sterling (1987-88)
- (New South Wales) Michael Erickson (1990)
- (New South Wales) David Woods (1995-96)
- (New South Wales) Dean Pay (1996)
- (New South Wales) John Simon (1997)
- (New South Wales) Jason Moodie (2001-02)
- (New South Wales) Ian Hindmarsh (2001)
- (New South Wales) Andrew Ryan (2002)
- (New South Wales) Jamie Lyon (2003)
- (New South Wales) John Morris (2003)
- (New South Wales) Glenn Morrison (2005)
- (New South Wales) Paul Stringer (2005)
- (New South Wales) Dean Widders (2006)
- (New South Wales) Brett Finch (2008)
- (New South Wales) Nathan Hindmarsh (2008)
- (New South Wales) Timana Tahu (2010)
- (New South Wales) Luke Burt (2010)
- (New South Wales) Daniel Alvaro (2017)

== Other honours ==
=== Australia Prime Minister's XIII ===
- (Australia) Nathan Hindmarsh (2005, 2008, 2011)
- (Australia) Brett Finch (2005)
- (Australia) Jarryd Hayne (2006, 2008)
- (Australia) Ben Smith (2010)
- (Australia) Tim Mannah (2011)
- (Australia) Luke Burt (2011)
- (Australia) Semi Radradra (2016)
- (Australia) Corey Norman (2017)
- (Australia) Nathan Brown (2019)
- (Australia) Clinton Gutherson (2019)
- (Australia) Reed Mahoney (2019)
- (Australia) Mitchell Moses (2019, 2025)
- (Australia) Sean Russell (2024)
- (Australia) Jack Williams (2025)
- (Australia) Tallyn Da Silva (2026)

=== Australia Prime Minister's XIII Women ===
- (Australia) Kennedy Cherrington (2023)
- (Australia) Rueben Cherrington (2023)
- (Australia) Abbi Church (2023-25)
- (Australia) Kimberley Hunt (2023)
- (Australia) Rachael Pearson (2023)
- (Australia) Taneka Todhunter (2023, 2026)
- (Australia) Cassey Tohi-Hiku (2023)
- (Australia) Rory Owen (2024, 2026)
- (Australia) Chloe Jackson (2025-26)
- (Australia) Tess McWilliams (2026)

=== Papua New Guinea Prime Minister's XIII Women ===
- (Papua New Guinea) Fleur Ginn (2025)
- (Papua New Guinea) Elsie Albert (2025)

=== All Golds ===
- (New Zealand) Nathan Cayless (2008)
- (New Zealand) Krisnan Inu (2008)

=== New Zealand Māori ===
- (New Zealand) David Kidwell (2000)
- (New Zealand) Weller Hauraki (2008)

== Representative Captains ==
=== World Cup Captains ===
New Zealand

- (New Zealand) Nathan Cayless (2008)

Italy

- (Italy) Nathan Brown (2022)

Lebanon

- (Lebanon) Mitch Moses (2022)

Samoa

- (Samoa) Frank Pritchard (2017)
- (Samoa) Junior Paulo (2022)

=== Test Captains ===
New Zealand

- (New Zealand) Jarrod McCracken (1999)
- (New Zealand) Nathan Cayless (2001, 2004, 2006, 2008)

Samoa

- (Samoa) Junior Paulo (2023)

Tonga

- (Tonga) Fuifui Moimoi (2006)
- (Tonga) Feleti Mateo (2010)

=== City Vs Country Origin ===
NSW Country

- (New South Wales) Peter Sterling (1987-88)

=== All Stars ===
Māori Women's

- (Māori people) Kennedy Cherrington (2026)

== Representative Player of the Match ==
=== World Cup Player of the Match ===
Italy

- (Italy) Nathan Brown (2022)

Lebanon

- (Lebanon) Mitch Moses (2017, 2022)

Fiji

- (Fiji) Jarryd Hayne (2008)

Tonga

- (Tonga) Fuifui Moimoi (2013)

United States

- (United States) Joseph Paulo (2013)

=== Pacific Championships Player of the Match ===
New Zealand

- (New Zealand) Dylan Brown (2025)

=== State of Origin Player of the Match ===
New South Wales

- (New South Wales) Peter Sterling (1983, 1986-87)
- (New South Wales) Peter Wynn (1985)
- (New South Wales) Brett Kenny (1986)
- (New South Wales) Jarryd Hayne (2014)
- (New South Wales) Mitchell Moses (2024)

== Representative Coaching Staff ==
=== International ===
Australia

- (Australia) Vic Hey (Coach – 1950–51)
- (Australia) Terry Fearnley (Coach – 1977)

Cook Islands

- (Australia) David Fairleigh (Coach – 2009)

New Zealand

- (New Zealand) Stephen Kearney (Coach – 2011–12)

=== City Vs Country Origin ===
NSW City

- (New South Wales) Brian Smith (Coach – 2002)

NSW Country

- (New South Wales) Michael Cronin (Coach – 1992)
- (New South Wales) Brian Smith (Coach – 2001, 2003)
