= Abbi Church =

Australia international rugby league footballer

Personal information
- Born: 6 March 1998 (age 28) Fairfield, New South Wales, Australia
- Height: 164 cm (5 ft 5 in)
- Weight: 70 kg (11 st 0 lb)

Playing information
- Position: Fullback, Centre
Club
Years	Team	Pld	T	G	FG	P
2021–	Parramatta Eels	48	11	0	0	44
Representative
Years	Team	Pld	T	G	FG	P
2023–25	Prime Minister's XIII	3	2	0	0	8
2025–	New South Wales	6	1	0	0	4
2025–	Australia	5	9	0	0	36
- Source: As of 16 November 2026

Abbi Church (born 6 March 1998) is an Australian rugby league footballer who plays for the Parramatta Eels in the NRL Women's Premiership.

A fullback or centre, Church is an Australian and New South Wales representative.

== Club career ==
Church played eight of eleven matches for St Marys Saints in the NSWRL Women's Premiership between March and June of 2021, including the first and final round. Due to a surge of COVID-19 cases, the 2021 NSWRL Women's Premiership final series was cancelled and the 2021 NRL Women's season was postponed from August–October 2021 to February–April 2022. In December 2021, Church was named in the inaugural NRLW squad of the Parramatta Eels.

Church made her NRLW debut in the first match played by the Parramatta Eels Women, coming off the interchange bench in the 60th minute, with ten minutes to play and the score 12-all. A last minute field goal by Maddie Studdon won the match for the Eels over the Newcastle Knights. After again playing off the bench in the second round, Church was promoted to start on the wing in the third. Her last two matches of the season were played at centre.

Church returned to the St Marys Saints for the 2022 NSWRL Women's Premiership season, playing in the first seven of eight matches between late April and early July 2022. As announced in early June 2022, the Eels again signed Church for the 2022 NRLW season.

After starting at centre in the first round of the 2022 NRLW season, Church was dropped. Although named as the 18th player reserve in the following three rounds, she did not take the field. Following one large and three narrow losses, the Eels defeated the Brisbane Broncos in the fifth and final round to finish in fourth place, edging out fellow one-game winners the Broncos and Gold Coast Titans on points difference. Church was recalled to the Eels starting side at centre for the semi-final, replacing the injured Tiana Penitani, and she scored the second of four tries as the Eels upset the minor-premier Sydney Roosters to win their way into the Grand Final. With the injured Penitani also ruled out of the Grand Final, Church played the game at centre. The Eels lost the premiership decider to the Newcastle Knights.

The St Marys Saints did not field a team in the 2023 NSWRL Women's Premiership season. Church played ten of a possible twelve matches for the Canterbury Bulldogs, beginning with the opening round at centre in early February and concluding with the nil-one Grand Final loss to Mounties at fullback in late April.

In the 2023 NRLW season, Church appeared at fullback in all nine matches played by the Eels, and was named the club's Player of the Year.

Church was named joint-captain of the Eels for the 2024 season. Her feat of playing the full complement of nine matches at fullback was repeated. The quality of her performances was again recognised, being named Dally M Fullback of the Year, and finishing equal second, (by two voted points) in the overall count to Dally M Player of the Year Olivia Kernick. At the club awards, Church was recognised as the winner of the player-voted and member-voted trophies.

The 2025 NRLW regular season expanded to eleven rounds to accommodate the return of the New Zealand Warriors and the introduction of the Canterbury Bulldogs as the twelfth team. Church played in all eleven matches, including captaining the Eels in the absence of the injured Mahalia Murphy. At the 2025 club presentation night, Church was awarded Player of the Year honours for the second time.

== Representative career ==
In her first open-age representative match, Church played for New South Wales County in May 2022.

In September 2023, Church made the first of three consecutive annual appearances for the Prime Minister's XIII.

Church was included in the Australian Jillaroos squad for the 2024 Pacific Championships but did not play a game.

Church made her interstate debut, for New South Wales, in the first match of 2025 State of Origin series. Church scored the last of her team's five tries as New South Wales won, 32 to 12. Retaining her spot at fullback for all three matches, Church was part of the two matches to one series win. Her effort across the three games was formally recognised, as Church received an award selected by the coaching staff at the Brad Fittler Medal presentation night.

Although missing initial selection for the 2025 Pacific Championships, Church was added to the squad after a pair of withdrawals. In her senior international match debut in the Jillaroos' second fixture, Church scored a try in the 42nd minute of a narrow 10-4 win and was named player of the match.

== Achievements and accolades ==
=== Representative ===
- Rugby League World Cup Champion: 2026
