= Martha Mataele =

NZ international rugby union & Tonga international rugby league player (born 1999)

- Born: Martha Lolohea; 9 July 1999 (age 27) Auckland
- Height: 1.69 m (5 ft 7 in)

Rugby union career
- Position(s): Wing; Flanker
Provincial / State sides
Years	Team	Apps	(Points)
2019–2023	Canterbury	30	(145)
Super Rugby
Years	Team	Apps	(Points)
2022–2024	Matatū	13	(20)
2023	Western Force	3	(20)
2025	Chiefs Manawa	3	(0)
International career
Years	Team	Apps	(Points)
2023	New Zealand	2	(5)
- Rugby league career

Playing information
- Position: wing, fullback
Club
Years	Team	Pld	T	G	FG	P
2025–	Parramatta Eels	20	9	0	0	36
Representative
Years	Team	Pld	T	G	FG	P
2025	Tonga	2	3	0	0	12
- Spouse: Manasa Mataele (m. 2021)
- Relatives: Atlanta Lolohea (sister)

Martha Mataele (née Lolohea; born 9 July 1999) is a New Zealand rugby union and rugby league player. She played for Chiefs Manawa in the Super Rugby Aupiki competition, represented Canterbury at Provincial level, and currently plays for Parramatta Eels in the NRLW.

== Rugby career ==
Mataele is of Tongan descent, she was born in Auckland and was raised in Christchurch. She first attended Villa Maria College before switching to Christchurch Girls’ High School in 2017.

Mataele made her debut for Canterbury in 2021 and then debuted for Matatū a year later in Super Rugby Aupiki's inaugural season.

Mataele and her sister, Atlanta Lolohea, were part of Matatū's squad that won the 2023 Super Rugby Aupiki season. She scored a try in her sides win against the Chiefs Manawa. She played for the Western Force in the 2023 Super W season. In July 2023, she was awarded the Rebecca Clough Medal at the Western Force awards night.

Mataele was named in the Black Ferns 30 player squad that will compete in their final O'Reilly Cup test in September and in the inaugural WXV1 tournament in October. She scored a try in her test debut on 30 September against the Wallaroos at Hamilton.

In 2025, she joined Chiefs Manawa's squad in Round 2 as an injury replacement.

=== Parramatta Eels Women ===
On 6 December 2024 it was reported that she had signed for Parramatta Eels in the NRL Women's Premiership on a 2-year deal.

== International ==
She made her début for Tonga in the 2025 Rugby League Pacific Championships 24-42 defeat to Cook Islands on 25 October 2025.

== Personal life ==
In August 2021, she married former Crusaders and Western Force winger, Manasa Mataele.
