= Elsie Albert =

Papua New Guinea international rugby league player

Personal information
- Born: 20 May 1996 (age 30) Nipa, Papua New Guinea
- Height: 170 cm (5 ft 7 in)
- Weight: 95 kg (14 st 13 lb)

Playing information
- Position: Prop
Club
Years	Team	Pld	T	G	FG	P
2020–22	St. George Illawarra Dragons	15	3	0	0	12
2023–	Parramatta Eels	31	8	0	0	24
	Total	46	11	0	0	36
Representative
Years	Team	Pld	T	G	FG	P
2018–	Papua New Guinea	11	4	0	0	16
2018–24	PNG Prime Minister's XIII	3	0	0	0	0
- Source: As of 2 November 2026

Elsie Albert (born 20 May 1996) is a Papua New Guinean rugby league footballer who plays as a prop for the Parramatta Eels in the NRL Women's Premiership.

She is the captain of the Papua New Guinea national team.

== Background ==
Born in Nipa in the Southern Highlands Province, Albert was a boxer growing up before taking up rugby league in high school.

Albert is a plant and insect expert having studied a Bachelor of Tropical Agriculture at the University of Natural Resources and Environment (UNRE) in Rabaul.

== Playing career ==
On 4 September 2018, Albert played for Papua New Guinea in an NRLW trial game against the Brisbane Broncos at Suncorp Stadium. On 6 October 2018, she made her Test debut for Papua New Guinea in a 4–40 loss to the Prime Minister's XIII in Port Moresby.

On 22 June 2019, she started at prop for Papua New Guinea in their 0–28 loss to Fiji at Leichhardt Oval. In October 2019, she represent Papua New Guinea at the World Cup 9s, scoring a try. On 16 November 2019, she captained Papua New Guinea in their first ever Test victory, a 20–16 win over England in Port Moresby.

In 2020, Albert moved to Australia, joining the Souths Logan Magpies QRL Women's Premiership team. On 24 September 2020, Albert signed with the St. George Illawarra Dragons NRL Women's Premiership team. In Round 1 of the 2020 NRL Women's season, she made her debut for the Dragons, becoming the first homegrown Papua New Guinean to play in the competition.

In 2021, she was forced to miss the QRL Women's Premiership season due to the COVID-19 pandemic, instead remaining in Papua New Guinea.

In April 2022 she played in the delayed 2021 NRLW Grand Final in which the Dragons lost 18–4 to the Sydney Roosters at Kayo Stadium.
