= Rachael Pearson =

Australian rugby league player

Personal information
- Full name: Rachael Pearson
- Born: 30 August 1993 (age 33) Wagga Wagga, New South Wales, Australia
- Weight: 68 kg (10 st 10 lb)

Playing information
- Position: Halfback, Five-eighth
Club
Years	Team	Pld	T	G	FG	P
2022	Helensburgh Tigers
2021–22	St George Illawarra Dragons	12	1	20	1	45
2023–	Parramatta Eels	36	5	86	2	194
	Total	48	6	106	3	239
Representative
Years	Team	Pld	T	G	FG	P
	NSW Country Origin
2022	New South Wales	5	0	11	0	22
2023	Prime Minister's XIII	1	0	5	0	10
- As of 2 November 2026
- Relatives: Emily Bass (cousin)

Rachael Pearson (born 30 August 1993) is an Australian professional rugby league footballer who plays as a halfback for the Parramatta Eels in the NRL Women's Premiership.

== Background ==
Prior to joining the Helensburgh Tigers for the 2021 NSW Women's Premiership season, Pearson had played soccer, Australian rules football and League tag in and around her hometown of Hay, New South Wales. After several matches with Helensburgh, Pearson was selected for NSW Country Origin in May 2021. Pearson scored a try in a Country's 16–40 loss to City. Pearson was subsequently signed by the St George Illawarra Dragons, making an impressive NRLW debut at halfback on 27 February 2022 in the Dragons' opening match of the postponed 2021 season.

Pearson is the cousin of fellow NRLW player Emily Bass, and the two were on opposing sides for an NRLW match on 13 March 2022.

== Playing career ==
Pearson was selected by her peers in the Rugby League Players Association Dream Team for the 2021 NRLW season, prior to playing in the Grand Final.

Following the Grand Final loss, Pearson was selected in an extended New South Wales squad and on 24 June 2022, made her Women's State of Origin debut. In a match in which both teams scored three tries each, Pearson's four goals (two conversions, two penalties) from five attempts helped New South Wales win, 20–14.
