= Mia Middleton =

Australian rugby league footballer (born 2003)

Personal information
- Full name: Mia Middleton
- Born: 23 April 2003 (age 22) Gosford, New South Wales, Australia
- Height: 169 cm (5 ft 7 in)
- Weight: 73 kg (11 st 7 lb)

Playing information
- Position: Centre, Wing
Club
Years	Team	Pld	T	G	FG	P
2023	Nth Qld Cowboys	4	0	0	0	0
2024–	Parramatta Eels	2	0	0	0	0
	Total	6	0	0	0	0
Representative
Years	Team	Pld	T	G	FG	P
2023	Indigenous All Stars	1	0	0	0	0
- Source: As of 30 July 2024

Mia Middleton (born 23 April 2003) is an Australian professional rugby league footballer who currently plays for the Parramatta Eels in the NRL Women's Premiership.

A centre or wing, she previously played for the North Queensland Cowboys and is an Indigenous All Stars representative.

== Background ==
Middleton was born in Gosford, New South Wales and is of Indigenous Australian descent. She played her junior rugby league for the Lakes United Seagulls.

== Playing career ==
=== Early years ===
In 2020, Middleton joined the Newcastle Knights, playing in their Tarsha Gale Cup side for three seasons. In June 2022, she represented New South Wales under-19 in their win over Queensland.

=== 2023 ===
In February, Middleton represented the Indigenous All Stars in their loss to the Māori All Stars and played for the Knights in their NSWRL Women's Premiership.

On 10 May, she signed a one-year contract with the North Queensland Cowboys.

In Round 1 of the 2023 NRL Women's season, she made her NRLW debut, starting on the wing in a 16–6 loss to the Gold Coast Titans. She was sin binned in the 53rd minute for a dangerous throw and subsequently suspended for two games.

=== 2024 ===
In 2024, Middleton joined the Parramatta Eels on a one-year contract.
