= Rory Owen =

Australian rugby league footballer

Personal information
- Full name: Rory Owen
- Born: 23 October 2003 (age 23) Brisbane, Queensland, Australia
- Height: 169 cm (5 ft 7 in)

Playing information
- Position: Centre
Club
Years	Team	Pld	T	G	FG	P
2024–	Parramatta Eels	24	17	0	0	68
Representative
Years	Team	Pld	T	G	FG	P
2024–26	Prime Minister's XIII	2	3	0	0	12
2025–26	Queensland	3	1	0	0	4
- Source: As of 2 November 2026

Rory Owen (born 23 October 2003) is an Australian professional rugby league footballer who currently plays for the Parramatta Eels in the NRL Women's Premiership.

== Background ==
Owen was born in Brisbane, Queensland and attended Ipswich Girls' Grammar School and St Margaret's Anglican Girls' School, where she participated in athletics and played touch football. Following high school, she attended the University of Sydney, where she played for their rugby sevens team.

== Playing career ==
=== 2024 ===
On 16 June, Owen switched to rugby league signing a one-year contract with the Parramatta Eels. She played her first rugby league match in July, starting at centre for Parramatta's NSWRL Women's Premiership in an 18–10 win over the Manly Sea Eagles.

In Round 1 of the 2024 NRL Women's season, she made her NRLW debut for the Eels, scoring a try in a 22–10 win over the Brisbane Broncos. In her first season of rugby league, she scored five tries in nine games and was named the RLPA Rookie of the Year.

On 29 September, she re-signed with the Eels until the end of the 2026 season. On 13 October, she represented the Prime Minister's XIII, scoring twice in their 50–0 win over Papua New Guinea.

=== 2025 ===
On 14 April, she was named to make her debut for Queensland in Game I of the 2025 Women's State of Origin series.

=== 2026 ===
She played for Prime Minister's XIII on 3 October 2026 in the 6-66 win over PNG Prime Minister's XIII in Port Moresby, scoring a try.
