= Prime Minister's XIII =

Australian representative rugby league team

Team information
- Governing body: Australian Rugby League
- Head coach: Kevin Walters
- Captain: Keaon Koloamatangi
- Most caps: Jake Trbojevic (6)
- Top try-scorer: Jarryd Hayne (6)
- Top point-scorer: Zac Lomax (40)

Uniforms
First colours

Team results
- First international
- PNG PM's XIII 0–34 (Australia) Australian PM's XIII (Lloyd Robson Oval, Port Moresby, Papua New Guinea; 18 September 2005)
- Biggest win
- PNG PM's XIII 0–58 (Australia) Australian PM's XIII (National Football Stadium, Port Moresby, Papua New Guinea; 24 September 2016)

Prime Minister's XIII, sometimes informally referred to as the PM's XIII, are a representative rugby league team, comprising Australian players from National Rugby League clubs. Initially, the team was selected from NRL clubs that did not qualify for the NRL finals. Over time this changed to include players whose teams were knocked out during the first two weeks of the finals, with the game played on the same weekend as the preliminary finals, one week prior to the NRL Grand Final. Since 2024, the Prime Minister's XIII game has been played on the weekend after the NRL Grand Final, with players from all clubs, including the Grand Finalists, available for selection.

== History ==
The Prime Minister's XIII first played against Papua New Guinea in 2005 at Lloyd Robson Oval in the Papua New Guinean capital, Port Moresby. The team was coached in that match by former Queensland State of Origin coach Mal Meninga, who coached the side until 2012. New South Wales State of Origin coach Laurie Daley then took over from 2013 to 2014 with Ivan Cleary coaching the team in 2015. Meninga, appointed Australian test coach in 2016 also re-took the reins that year.

Originally played in Port Moresby, in recent years the games have been held in various locations around Papua New Guinea, including Lae and Kokopo. Unlike regular international matches, each team is allowed a five-man bench and given unlimited interchanges throughout the match.

Because the selected Australian players are not participating in the NRL finals (and are part of the Australian Test 'train-on' squad), the match is primarily used to keep potential international players match fit ahead of any end-of-season international fixtures. As the match has been played later in September, players who play for a team that has been knocked out in the first two weeks of the finals have been able to be selected for the side.

The match is also used to promote rugby league, as well as humanitarian causes such as HIV and AIDS awareness, among the Papua New Guinean community.

The PM's XIII has never lost a match against Papua New Guinea since the annual fixture commenced, but was held to a 24–24 draw in 2007, after leading 20–0 at half time.

In 2019, the PM's XIII played against the Fiji Prime Minister's XIII for the first time, at the ANZ National Stadium in Suva.

In 2022, after a two-year absence due to the COVID-19 pandemic, the fixture returned with the PM'x XIII playing the PNG PM's XIII at Suncorp Stadium, the first game to be held in Australia.

== Current squad ==
=== Men ===
The Australian squad for the match on 3 October 2026 was announced on 25 September 2026. An update to the squad was announced on 30 September 2026, with four changes.

Tallies in the table include the 2026 match.

J#	Player	Age	Position(s)	PM's XIII					Test Matches	Club	Club Matches			Other Reps
J#	Player	Age	Position(s)	M	T	G	F	P	Test Matches	Club	CC	NRL	NQC	Other Reps
1	Jaxon Purdue	21	Centre	1	2	0	0	8	Test Matches	0	Cowboys	57	57	8
2	Nick Meaney	29	Centre	1	1	7	0	18	Test Matches	0	Storm	114	179	36
3	Tom Chester	25	Fullback, Centre	1	1	0	0	4	Test Matches	0	Cowboys	36	36	24
4	David Fifita	26	Centre	2	1	0	0	4	Test Matches	0	Rabbitohs	17	151	10	8 4 4
5	Braidon Burns	30	Wing	1	0	0	0	0	0	Cowboys	38	100	43
6	Ezra Mam	23	Five-eighth	1	3	0	0	12	0	Broncos	91	91	19
7	Lachlan Galvin	21	Halfback	2	0	0	0	0	0	Bulldogs	38	69	1
8	Toby Couchman	23	Prop	1	0	0	0	0	0	Dragons	61	61	15
9	Billy Walters	32	Hooker	1	1	0	0	4	0	Broncos	104	116	99
10	Thomas Hazelton	27	Prop	1	1	0	0	4	0	Sharks	81	81
11	Ryan Couchman	23	Second-row	1	0	0	0	0	0	Dragons	32	32	34
12	Hamish Stewart	22	Second-row, Lock	1	0	0	0	0	0	Dragons	43	43	17
13	Josh Curran	27	Prop	3	0	1	0	2	0	Bulldogs	61	122	32	4
14	Owen Pattie	22	Hooker	1	0	0	0	0	0	Raiders	41	41	21
15	Jock Madden	26	Halfback	1	0	0	0	0	0	Wests Tigers	15	47	58
16	Tallyn Da Silva	21	Hooker	1	1	0	0	4	0	Eels	33	55	18
17	Kurtis Morrin	26	Second-row, Prop	1	1	0	0	4	0	Titans	22	68		1
18	Josh Kerr	30	Prop	1	0	0	0	0	0	Dragons	48	135	80	7
19	Alex Seyfarth	27	Second-row, Prop	2	0	0	0	0	0	Wests Tigers	114	114
20	Jamal Fogarty	32	Halfback	2	0	0	0	0	0	Sea Eagles	22	140		1

Notes:

- From the initially announced squad, William Kennedy, Sosefo Fifita, Kurt Mann, and Nathan Brown were ruled out. They were replaced by Thomas Hazelton, Kurtis Morrin, Alex Seyfarth, and Jamal Fogarty.

=== Women ===
The Australian women's squad for the match on 3 October 2026 was announced on 25 September 2026. Players were listed alphabetically by their given names.

Tallies in the table include the 2026 match.

J#	Player	Age	Position(s)	PM's XIII					Test Matches	Club	Club Matches			Other Reps
J#	Player	Age	Position(s)	M	T	G	F	P	Test Matches	Club	CC	NRL	NQC	Other Reps
1	Andie Robinson	24	Fullback	2	2	0	0	8	Test Matches	0	Bulldogs	22	33	26.008
2	Jada Taylor	23	Wing, Fullback	1	3	0	0	12	Test Matches	0	Sharks	25	26	8	2
3	Rory Owen	22	Centre	2	3	0	0	12	Test Matches	0	Eels	24	24	1	5
4	Tahlia O'Brien	18	Centre, Second-row	1	1	0	0	4	Test Matches	0	Dragons	13	13	5
5	Jasmin Morrissey	23	Wing, Centre	2	2	0	0	8	0	Eels	8	9	18
6	Georgia Hannaway	25	Five-eighth, Hooker	2	0	6	0	12	0	Sharks	29	29	11	1
7	Kasey Reh	20	Halfback, Five-eighth	3	1	0	0	4	0	Dragons	30	30	0
8	Jacinta Carter	22	Prop	1	0	0	0	0	0	Sharks	16	19	34
9	Tori Shipton	18	Hooker	2	0	0	0	0	0	Dragons	14	14	18
10	Ruby-Jean Kennard-Ellis	23	Prop	1	0	0	0	0	0	Dragons	11	26	33
11	Chloe Jackson	22	Second-row	2	0	0	0	0	0	Eels	27	27	14
12	China Polata	24	Second-row, Centre	2	0	0	0	0	0	Sharks	9	27	15	1 2
13	Bree Chester	24	Lock, Second-row	3	0	0	0	0	0	Cowboys	40	40	22	3
14	Taneka Todhunter	24	Hooker, Halfback	2	3	0	0	12	0	Eels	30	30	15	2
15	Montana Clifford	22	Second-row	1	0	0	0	0	0	Dragons	11	22	11
16	Tayla Preston	27	Halfback, Five-eighth	2	1	5	0	14	0	Bulldogs	22	48	45
17	Ahlivia Ingram	25	Prop	2	0	0	0	0	0	Dragons	15	17	22	1
18	Khyliah Gray	19	Lock, Five-eighth	1	0	0	0	0	0	Eels	5	5	17
19	Tess McWilliams	20	Prop	1	0	0	0	0	0	Eels	16	16	6
20	Lucy Spain	18	Fullback, Centre	1	0	0	0	0	0	Knights	11	11	13

== Results ==
=== 2005 ===
18 September 2005

PNG PM's XIII (Papua New Guinea)	0 – 34	(Australia) Australian PM's XIII
	Report	Tries; 2 Ryan Cross; 1 Braith Anasta; 1 Brett Finch; 1 Kurt Gidley; 1 Luke Priddis; Goals; 1 Clinton Schifcofske; 1 Kurt Gidley; 1 Luke Ricketson

Lloyd Robson Oval, Port Moresby
Attendance: 9,000
Referee: Shayne Hayne (Australia)

Prime Minister's XIII
2005 squad		Coaching staff
1 Clinton Schifcofske – FB; 2 Amos Roberts – WG; 3 Ryan Cross – CE; 4 Reni Maitua – CE; 5 Kurt Gidley – WG; 6 Braith Anasta – FE; 7 Brett Finch – HB; 8 Ben Ross – PR; 9 Luke Priddis – HK; 10 Steve Price – PR; 11 Luke Ricketson (c) – SR; 12 Clint Newton – SR; 13 Ashley Harrison – LK	14 Chris Flannery – LK; 15 John Sutton – FE; 16 Craig Gower – HK; 17 Anthony Tupou – PR	Head coach: Mal Meninga; Legend: (c) Captain(s); (vc) Vice-captain(s)

=== 2006 ===
30 September 2006

PNG PM's XIII (Papua New Guinea)	8 – 28	(Australia) Australian PM's XIII
Tries; Tom O'Reilly 2	Report	Tries; 2 Jarryd Hayne; 1 Nathan Merritt; 1 Steve Price; 1 Brett Stewart; 1 Trent Waterhouse; Goals; 2 Matt Orford

Lloyd Robson Oval, Port Moresby
Referee: Ben Cummins (Australia)

Prime Minister's XIII
2006 squad		Coaching staff
1 Brett Stewart – FB; 2 Jarryd Hayne – WG; 3 Amos Roberts – CE; 4 Kurt Gidley – CE; 5 Nathan Merritt – WG; 6 Johnathan Thurston – FE; 7 Matt Orford – HB; 8 Shane Tronc – PR; 9 Robbie Farah – HK; 10 Steve Price (c) – PR; 11 Luke O'Donnell – SR; 12 Paul Gallen – SR; 13 Trent Waterhouse – LK	14 Jarrod Mullen – HB; 15 Anthony Tupou – SR; 16 Craig Stapleton – PR; 17 Adam Woolnough – PR	Head coach: Mal Meninga; Legend: (c) Captain(s); (vc) Vice-captain(s)

=== 2007 ===
23 September 2007

PNG PM's XIII (Papua New Guinea)	24 – 24	(Australia) Australian PM's XIII
Tries; Nigel Hukula 1 Jessie Joe Nandye 1 Keith Peters 1 Menzie Yere 1 Goals; Gimapau Keimelo 4	Report	Tries; 2 Chris Lawrence; 2 Joel Monaghan; 1 Luke Douglas; Goals; 2 Kurt Gidley

Lloyd Robson Oval, Port Moresby
Attendance: 16,000
Referee: Gavin Badger (Australia)

Prime Minister's XIII
2007 squad		Coaching staff
1 Kurt Gidley – FB; 2 Brett Delaney – WG; 3 Mark Gasnier (c) – CE; 4 Joel Monaghan – CE; 5 Chris Lawrence – WG; 6 Greg Bird – FE; 7 Scott Prince – HB; 8 David Shillington – PR; 9 Lincoln Withers – HK; 10 Luke Douglas – PR; 11 Anthony Tupou – SR; 12 Paul Gallen – SR; 13 Braith Anasta – LK	14 Dean Widders – SR; 15 Nate Myles – SR; 16 Sam Thaiday – PR; 17 Ben Pomeroy – CE	Head coach: Mal Meninga; Legend: (c) Captain(s); (vc) Vice-captain(s)

=== 2008 ===
28 September 2008

PNG PM's XIII (Papua New Guinea)	30 – 54	(Australia) Australian PM's XIII
Tries; Stanley Gene 2 Menzie Yere 2 Nickson Kolo 1 Junior Ropra 1 Goals; Tu'u Maori 3	Report	Tries; 2 Jarryd Hayne; 2 Chris Lawrence; 1 Robbie Farah; 1 Nathan Hindmarsh; 1 Michael Jennings; 1 Josh Morris; 1 Joe Picker; 1 Carl Webb; Goals; 6 Scott Prince; 1 Terry Campese

Lloyd Robson Oval, Port Moresby
Attendance: 10,000
Referee: Bernard Sutton (Australia)

Prime Minister's XIII
2008 squad		Coaching staff
1 Jarryd Hayne – FB; 2 Chris Lawrence – WG; 3 Michael Jennings – CE; 4 Joel Monaghan – CE; 5 Josh Morris – WG; 6 Terry Campese – FE; 7 Scott Prince – HB; 8 Carl Webb – PR; 9 Robbie Farah – HK; 10 Ben Cross – PR; 11 Nathan Hindmarsh (c) – SR; 12 Luke O'Donnell – SR; 13 Alan Tongue – LK	14 Craig Wing – HK; 15 Chris Heighington – SR; 16 Cory Paterson – SR; 17 Joe Picker – SR	Head coach: Mal Meninga; Legend: (c) Captain(s); (vc) Vice-captain(s)

=== 2009 ===
27 September 2009

PNG PM's XIII (Papua New Guinea)	18 – 42	(Australia) Australian PM's XIII
Tries; Tommy Butterfield 1 Seigfried Gande 1 Jessie Joe Nandye 1 Goals; Glen Nami 3/3	Report	Tries; 3 Michael Jennings; 1 George Rose; 1 Matthew Scott; 1 David Shillington; 1 Glenn Stewart; Goals; 7/7 Johnathan Thurston

Lloyd Robson Oval, Port Moresby
Attendance: 10,000
Referee: Brett Suttor (Australia)

Prime Minister's XIII
2009 squad		Coaching staff
1 Josh Dugan – FB; 2 Michael Robertson – WG; 3 Michael Jennings – CE; 4 Joel Monaghan – CE; 5 David Williams – WG; 6 Terry Campese – FE; 7 Johnathan Thurston (c) – HB; 8 David Shillington – PR; 9 Robbie Farah – HK; 10 Matt Scott – PR; 11 Trent Waterhouse – SR; 12 Luke O'Donnell – SR; 13 Glenn Stewart – LK	14 Chris Heighington – SR; 15 Nate Myles – PR; 16 Tom Learoyd-Lahrs – SR; 17 George Rose – PR; 18 Ben Jones – HK	Head coach: Mal Meninga; Legend: (c) Captain(s); (vc) Vice-captain(s)

=== 2010 ===
26 September 2010

PNG PM's XIII (Papua New Guinea)	18 – 30	(Australia) Australian PM's XIII
Tries; Nickson Kolo 2 Glen Nami 1 Goals; Ryan Tongia 3	Report	Tries; 1 Luke Douglas; 1 Chris Sandow; 1 Ben Smith; 1 Kade Snowden; 1 Willie Tonga; 1 Akuila Uate; Goals; 2 Corey Parker; 1 James Maloney

Lloyd Robson Oval, Port Moresby
Attendance: 10,856
Referee: Tony De Las Heras (Australia)

Prime Minister's XIII
2010 squad		Coaching staff
1 Matthew Bowen – FB; 2 Akuila Uate – WG; 3 Blake Ferguson – CE; 4 Willie Tonga – CE; 5 Tony Williams – WG; 6 James Maloney – FE; 7 Chris Sandow – HB; 8 Luke Douglas – PR; 9 Michael Ennis – HK; 10 Tim Mannah – PR; 11 Matt Gillett – SR; 12 Ben Smith – SR; 13 Corey Parker (c) – LK	14 Anthony Watts – HK; 15 David Taylor – SR; 16 Kade Snowden – PR; 17 Chris Bailey – FE; 18 Micheal Luck – LK	Head coach: Mal Meninga; Legend: (c) Captain(s); (vc) Vice-captain(s)

=== 2011 ===
25 September 2011

PNG PM's XIII (Papua New Guinea)	22 – 36	(Australia) Australian PM's XIII
Tries; Josiah Abavu 1 Dion Aiye 1 Jessie Joe Nandye 1 Ray Thompson 1 Goals; Glen Nami 3	Report	Tries; 2 Blake Ferguson; 2 Josh Morris; 1 Luke Burt; 1 Nathan Merritt; Goals; 3 Luke Burt; 1 Matthew Bowen; 1 Michael Crocker; 1 Nathan Hindmarsh

Sir Ignatius Kilage Stadium, Lae
Attendance: 16,528
Referee: Adam Devcich (Australia)

Prime Minister's XIII
2011 squad		Coaching staff
1 Matthew Bowen – FB; 2 Blake Ferguson – WG; 3 Michael Jennings – CE; 4 Josh Morris – CE; 5 Nathan Merritt – WG; 6 Greg Bird – FE; 7 Mitchell Pearce – HB; 8 David Shillington – PR; 9 Jake Friend – HK; 10 Tim Mannah – PR; 11 Michael Crocker – SR; 12 Nathan Hindmarsh (c) – SR; 13 Nate Myles – LK	14 Chris McQueen – WG; 15 Tim Grant – PR; 16 Luke Douglas – PR; 17 Ben Barba – FB; 18 Luke Burt – WG	Head coach: Mal Meninga; Legend: (c) Captain(s); (vc) Vice-captain(s)

=== 2012 ===
23 September 2012

PNG PM's XIII (Papua New Guinea)	18 – 24	(Australia) Australian PM's XIII
Tries; Richard Kambo 1 David Loko 1 Albert Patak 1 Matthew Puke 1 Goals; Israel Eliab 1/4	Report	Tries; 1 Michael Jennings; 1 Feleti Mateo; 1 Beau Ryan; 1 Akuila Uate; Goals; 4/4 Scott Prince

Lloyd Robson Oval, Port Moresby
Attendance: 16,000
Referee: Phil Haines (Australia)

Prime Minister's XIII
2012 squad		Coaching staff
1 Darius Boyd – FB; 2 Akuila Uate – WG; 3 Michael Jennings – CE; 4 Chris Lawrence – CE; 5 Beau Ryan – WG; 6 Lachlan Coote – FE; 7 Scott Prince (c) – HB; 8 Aaron Woods – PR; 9 Kevin Kingston – HK; 10 Tim Mannah – PR; 11 Ben Te'o – SR; 12 Feleti Mateo – SR; 13 Wade Graham – LK	14 Dan Hunt – PR; 15 Martin Kennedy – PR; 16 Josh McGuire – PR; 17 Matthew Ryan – SR; 18 Nathan Stapleton – WG	Head coach: Mal Meninga; Legend: (c) Captain(s); (vc) Vice-captain(s)

=== 2013 ===
29 September 2013

PNG PM's XIII (Papua New Guinea)	10 – 50	(Australia) Australian PM's XIII
Tries; Josiah Abavu 1 Israel Eliab 1 Goals; Sebastian Pandia 1	Report	Tries; 2 Jarryd Hayne; 1 Kevin Gordon; 1 Brett Morris; 1 Josh Papalii; 1 Aidan Sezer; 1 David Shillington; 1 James Tamou; 1 Brent Tate; Goals; 6 Aidan Sezer; 1 Corey Parker

Kalabond Oval, Kokopo
Attendance: 7,000
Referee: Gavin Morris (Australia)

Prime Minister's XIII
2013 squad		Coaching staff
1 Jarryd Hayne – FB; 2 Brett Morris – WG; 3 Brent Tate – CE; 4 Josh Morris – CE; 5 Kevin Gordon – WG; 6 Greg Bird – FE; 7 Aidan Sezer – HB; 8 Ryan James – PR; 9 Robbie Farah (c) – HK; 10 James Tamou – PR; 11 Sam Thaiday – SR; 12 Josh Papalii – SR; 13 Corey Parker – LK	14 Gavin Cooper – SR; 15 Matt Gillett – SR; 16 David Shillington – PR; 17 Josh Reynolds – FE; 18 Ben Hannant – SR	Head coach: Laurie Daley; Legend: (c) Captain(s); (vc) Vice-captain(s)

=== 2014 ===
12 October 2014

PNG PM's XIII (Papua New Guinea)	16 – 34	(Australia) Australian PM's XIII
Tries; Thompson Teteh 2 Israel Eliab 1 Goals; Noel Zeming 2	Report	Tries; 2 Aaron Woods; 1 Will Chambers; 1 Josh Mansour; 1 Anthony Milford; 1 Beau Scott; Goals; 3 Ben Hunt; 2 Matt Moylan

Kalabond Oval, Kokopo
Attendance: 7,000
Referee: Grant Atkins (Australia)

Prime Minister's XIII
2014 squad		Coaching staff
1 Matt Moylan – FB; 2 Josh Mansour – WG; 3 Will Chambers – CE; 4 Sione Mata'utia – CE; 5 Daniel Tupou – WG; 6 Anthony Milford – FE; 7 Ben Hunt – HB; 8 Aaron Woods – PR; 9 Robbie Farah – HK; 10 Josh Papalii – PR; 11 Ryan Hoffman – SR; 12 Beau Scott – SR; 13 Greg Bird (c) – LK	14 Michael Morgan – FB; 15 Brenton Lawrence – PR; 16 Josh McGuire – PR; 17 Dylan Napa – PR; 18 Jarrod Croker – CE	Head coach: Laurie Daley; Legend: (c) Captain(s); (vc) Vice-captain(s)

=== 2015 ===
26 September 2015

PNG PM's XIII (Papua New Guinea)	12 – 40	(Australia) Australian PM's XIII
Tries; Watson Boas 1 Justin Olam 1 Goals; David Missian 2	Report	Tries; 2 David Nofoaluma; 1 Euan Aitken; 1 Jarrod Croker; 1 Alex Johnston; 1 Jeremy Latimore; 1 Chris McQueen; 1 Jack Wighton; Goals; 2 Jarrod Croker; 2 Adam Reynolds

Sir John Guise Stadium, Port Moresby
Attendance: 18,113
Referee: Gavin Reynolds (Australia)

Prime Minister's XIII
2015 squad		Coaching staff
1 Jack Wighton – FB; 2 Alex Johnston – WG; 3 Jarrod Croker – CE; 4 Dane Gagai – CE; 5 David Nofoaluma – WG; 6 Kane Elgey – FE; 7 Adam Reynolds – HB; 8 Jake Trbojevic – PR; 9 James Segeyaro – HK; 10 Reagan Campbell-Gillard – PR; 11 Tepai Moeroa – SR; 12 Chris McQueen – SR; 13 Trent Merrin (c) – LK	14 Euan Aitken – CE; 15 Jeremy Latimore – PR; 16 Daniel Mortimer – FE; 17 Tom Symonds – SR; 18 Dave Tyrrell – PR	Head coach: Ivan Cleary; Legend: (c) Captain(s); (vc) Vice-captain(s)

=== 2016 ===
24 September 2016

PNG PM's XIII (Papua New Guinea)	0 – 58	(Australia) Australian PM's XIII
	Report	Tries: 3 Mitchell Moses; 2 Josh Dugan; 2 Blake Ferguson; 2 Greg Inglis; 1 Moses Mbye; 1 Semi Radradra; Goals: 4 Matt Moylan; 3 Mitchell Moses

National Football Stadium, Port Moresby
Attendance: 15,011
Referee: David Munro (Australia)

Prime Minister's XIII
2016 squad		Coaching staff
1 James Tedesco – FB; 2 Semi Radradra – WG; 3 Greg Inglis (c) – CE; 4 Josh Dugan – CE; 5 Blake Ferguson – WG; 6 Mitchell Moses – FE; 7 Mitchell Pearce – HB; 8 Aaron Woods – PR; 9 Jake Friend – HK; 10 Ryan James – PR; 11 Boyd Cordner – SR; 12 Tyson Frizell – SR; 13 Josh Jackson – LK	14 David Klemmer – PR; 15 Moses Mbye – FE; 16 Dylan Napa – PR; 17 Jake Trbojevic – PR; 18 Matt Moylan – FB	Head coach: Mal Meninga; Legend: (c) Captain(s); (vc) Vice-captain(s)

=== 2017 ===
23 September 2017

PNG PM's XIII (Papua New Guinea)	8 – 48	(Australia) Australian PM's XIII
Tries: Stanford Talita 1 Goals: Jason Missian 2/2	Report	Tries: 3 Tom Trbojevic; 3 James Tedesco; 1 Tyson Frizell; 1 James Maloney; Goals: 6/6 James Maloney; 1/1 Andrew Fifita; 1/1 Valentine Holmes

National Football Stadium, Port Moresby
Attendance: 13,468
Referee: Henry Perenara (New Zealand)

Prime Minister's XIII
2017 squad		Coaching staff
1 James Tedesco – FB; 2 Dane Gagai – WG; 3 Josh Dugan – CE; 4 Tom Trbojevic – CE; 5 Valentine Holmes – WG; 6 Jack Bird – FE; 7 James Maloney – HB; 8 Aaron Woods (c) – PR; 9 Api Koroisau – HK; 10 Andrew Fifita – PR; 11 Tyson Frizell – SR; 12 Josh Papalii – SR; 13 Jake Trbojevic – LK	14 Wade Graham – SR; 15 David Klemmer – PR; 16 Dylan Walker – CE; 17 Josh Jackson – SR; 18 Paul Vaughan – PR; 19 Corey Norman – FE	Head coach: Mal Meninga; Legend: (c) Captain(s); (vc) Vice-captain(s)

=== 2018 ===
6 October 2018

PNG PM's XIII (Papua New Guinea)	18 – 34	(Australia) Australian PM's XIII
Tries: 3 Laybutt; Martin; Olam; Goals: 3 Martin 3/3	1st: 6 – 24; 2nd: 12 – 10; Report	Tries: 6 Cherry-Evans 2 Allan; Cotric; Townsend; Trbojevic; Goals: 5 Lomax 5/6

National Football Stadium, Port Moresby
Attendance: 14,007
Referee: Chris Sutton (Australia)

Prime Minister's XIII
2018 squad		Coaching staff
1 Corey Allan – FB; 2 Zac Lomax – WG; 3 Jesse Ramien – CE; 4 Brian Kelly – CE; 5 Nick Cotric – WG; 6 Jake Clifford – FE; 7 Daly Cherry-Evans (c) – HB; 8 David Klemmer – PR; 9 Ben Hunt – HK; 10 Jordan McLean – PR; 11 Tyson Frizell – SR; 12 Tyrone Peachey – SR; 13 Jake Trbojevic – LK	14 Aaron Woods – PR; 15 Reagan Campbell-Gillard – PR; 16 Matt Prior – PR; 17 Chad Townsend – HB; 18 Gehamat Shibasaki – CE; 19 Reece Robson – HK; 20 Enari Tuala – CE	Head coach: Mal Meninga; Legend: (c) Captain(s); (vc) Vice-captain(s)

=== 2019 ===
11 October 2019
6:30pm

Fiji PM's XIII	10 – 52	(Australia) Australian PM's XIII
Tries: 2 Ropate Tobe 19'; Apimeleki Lutu 53'; Goals: 1 Timoci Namotokula 1/1 54'; Maika Tudravu 0/1	1st: 4 – 26; 2nd: 6 – 26	Tries: 11; Feldt 2 2' 43'; Haas 6'; Graham 10'; Gutherson 3 22' 29' 50'; Momirovski 65'; Garrick 69'; Fifita 74'; Walker 80'; Goals: 4 Moses 2/4 7', 23'; Momirovski 2/3 30', 45'; Garrick 0/1; Hunt 0/1; Gutherson 0/1; Feldt 0/1

ANZ National Stadium, Suva
Referee: Chris Butler (Australia)

Prime Minister's XIII
2019 squad		Coaching staff
1 Clinton Gutherson – FB; 2 Kyle Feldt – WG; 20 Curtis Scott – CE; 4 Brad Parker – CE; 5 Campbell Graham – WG; 6 Cody Walker – FE; 7 Mitchell Moses – HB; 8 Jai Arrow – LK; 9 Ben Hunt – HK; 10 Payne Haas – PR; 11 Wade Graham (c) – SR; 12 Tyson Frizell – SR; 13 Jake Trbojevic – LK	3 Paul Momirovski – CE; 14 Tino Fa'asuamaleaui – SR; 15 Reuben Garrick – WG; 16 David Fifita – SR; 17 Reed Mahoney – HK; 18 Nathan Brown – LK; 19 Thomas Flegler – PR	Head coach: Mal Meninga; Legend: (c) Captain(s); (vc) Vice-captain(s)

=== 2022 ===
25 September 2022
7:35pm

Australian PM's XIII (Australia)	64 –14	(Papua New Guinea) PNG PM's XIII
Tries: 12; Butcher 2'; Addo-Carr 9'; Crichton 12'; Lomax 14'; Burton 2 22' 64'; Cobbo 2 29' 79'; Averillo 33'; Walker 69'; Laurie 72'; Fermor 74'; Goals: 8 Lomax 8/11 3', 11', 13', 15', 24', 71', 73', 75'; Addo-Carr 0/1	1st: 38 – 4; 2nd: 26 – 10	Tries: 3 Gebbie 39'; Ngutlik 44'; Nima 54'; Goals: 1 Laybutt 1/3 45'

Suncorp Stadium, Brisbane
Referee: Todd Smith (Australia)

Prime Minister's XIII
2022 squad		Coaching staff
1 Daine Laurie – FB; 2 Josh Addo-Carr – WG; 3 Selwyn Cobbo – CE; 4 Zac Lomax – CE; 5 Sosefo Fifita – WG; 6 Matt Burton – FE; 7 Daly Cherry-Evans (c) – HB; 8 Tino Fa'asuamaleaui – PR; 9 Ben Hunt – HK; 10 Thomas Flegler – PR; 11 Nat Butcher – SR; 12 Angus Crichton – SR; 13 Josh King – LK	14 Max King – PR; 15 Beau Fermor – SR; 16 Jake Simpkin – HK; 17 Luke Garner – SR; 18 Josh Curran – LK; 19 Jake Averillo – FB; 20 Sam Walker – HB	Head coach: Mal Meninga; Legend: (c) Captain(s); (vc) Vice-captain(s)

=== 2023 ===
23 September 2023
16:00 PST

PNG PM's XIII (Papua New Guinea)	18–30	(Australia) Australian PM's XIII
Tries: 3 Macdonald 4'; Ten 46'; Kapinias 70'; Goals: 3 Z. Laybutt 3/3 6', 48', 71'	1st: 6–12; 2nd: 12–18; Report	Tries: 5 Taulagi 15'; Young 33'; Khan-Pereira 58'; McInnes 61'; Sloan 79'; Goals: 5 Lomax 5/5 17', 35', 58', 63', 80'

Santos National Football Stadium, Port Moresby
Referee: (Australia) Peter Gough

Prime Minister's XIII
2023 squad		Coaching staff
1 Tyrell Sloan – FB; 5 Murray Taulagi – WG; 3 Hamiso Tabuai-Fidow – CE; 4 Zac Lomax – CE; 17 Alofiana Khan-Pereira – WG; 6 Cody Walker – FE; 7 Daly Cherry-Evans (vc) – HB; 8 Jake Trbojevic – PR; 9 Ben Hunt – HK; 10 Tino Fa'asuamaleaui – PR; 11 Hudson Young – SR; 12 Reuben Cotter – SR; 13 Cameron Murray (c) – LK	14 Reece Robson – HK; 15 Nicholas Hynes – FE; 16 Tom Dearden – FE; 18 Cameron McInnes – HK; 19 Emre Guler – PR; 20 Michael Molo – PR; 2 Josh Addo-Carr – WG	Head coach: Mal Meninga; Legend: (c) Captain(s); (vc) Vice-captain(s)

=== 2024 ===
13 October 2024
15:05 PST

PNG PM's XIII (Papua New Guinea)	20–42	(Australia) Australian PM's XIII
Tries: 4 Rumbu 4'; Mathias 9'; Glare 69'; Max 76'; Goals: 2 Mavoko 2/4 6', 11'	1st: 12–16; 2nd: 8–26; Report	Tries: 8 Fermor 13'; Wishart 27'; Liddle 33'; Weekes 42', 48'; Khan-Pereira 53'; Lucas 59'; McIntyre 73'; Goals: 5 Garrick 4/7 15', 35', 44', 59'; Fermor 1/1 74'

Santos National Football Stadium, Port Moresby
Referee: (Australia) Liam Kennedy

Prime Minister's XIII
2024 squad		Coaching staff
1 Fletcher Sharpe – FB; 2 Xavier Savage – WG; 3 Reuben Garrick – CE; 4 Sean Russell – CE; 5 Alofiana Khan-Pereira – WG; 6 Lachlan Galvin – FE; 7 Jamal Fogarty – HB; 10 Sam McIntyre – PR; 9 Damien Cook (c) – HK; 18 Alex Seyfarth – PR; 12 Beau Fermor – SR; 15 Dylan Lucas – SR; 13 Kobe Hetherington – LK	14 Jacob Liddle – HK; 16 Tallis Duncan – LK; 17 Ethan Bullemor – SR; 19 Luke Brooks – FE; 8 Tyran Wishart – HB; 20 Kaeo Weekes – FE	Head coach: Brad Fittler; Legend: (c) Captain(s); (vc) Vice-captain(s)

=== 2025 ===
12 October 2025
15:05 PST

PNG PM's XIII (Papua New Guinea)	10–28	(Australia) Australian PM's XIII
Tries: 2 Dotoi 13'; Kapinias 74'; Goals: 1 Morea 1/1 75'; Glare 0/1	1st: 4–16; 2nd: 6–12; Report	Tries: 7 Fuller 4 7', 22', 27', 69'; Duncan 19'; Best 57'; Wishart 59'; Goals: 0 Campbell 0/4; Flanagan 0/1; Moses 0/2

Santos National Football Stadium, Port Moresby
Referee: (Australia)
Video referee: Matt Noyen

Prime Minister's XIII
2025 squad		Coaching staff
1 Jye Gray – FB; 2 Jason Saab – WG; 3 Bradman Best – CE; 4 Ethan Strange – CE; 5 Trai Fuller – WG; 6 Kyle Flanagan – FE; 7 Jayden Campbell – HB; 8 Corey Horsburgh – PR; 9 Tom Starling – HK; 10 Keaon Koloamatangi (c) – PR; 11 Tallis Duncan – SR; 12 Joshua Curran – SR; 13 Matt Eisenhuth – LK	14 Jack Williams – LK; 15 Harrison Edwards – LK; 16 Tyran Wishart – FE; 17 Liam Henry – SR; 18 Fletcher Hunt – WG; 19 Mitchell Moses – HB	Head coach: Kevin Walters; Legend: (c) Captain(s); (vc) Vice-captain(s)

=== 2026 ===
3 October 2026
15:05 PST

PNG PM's XIII (Papua New Guinea)	10–60	(Australia) Australian PM's XIII
Tries: 2 Namo 67'; Ben 71' Goals: 1 Ben 69'	1st: 0–38; 2nd: 10–22; Report	Tries: 11; Mam 3 3', 32', 46'; Purdue 2 9', 64'; Walters 6'; Meaney 13'; Hazleton 35'; Da Silva 38'; Chester 49'; Morton 78'; Goals: 8/11; Meaney 7/9 4', 8', 33', 36', 39', 47', 50'; Curran 1/1 79'; Fogarty 0/1

Santos National Football Stadium, Port Moresby
Referee: (Australia) Grant Atkins
Video referee: Liam Kennedy
Touch judges: Tom Cambourn, Ethan Klein

== Women's results ==
=== 2024 ===
13 October 2024
13:00 PST

PNG PM's XIII (Papua New Guinea)	0-50	(Australia) Australian PM's XIII
	1st: 0-44; 2nd: 0-6; Report	Tries: 9 Browne 2', 15', 44'; Owen 5', 23'; Chapman 9', 17'; Apps 26'; Berry 30'; Goals: 7 Dibb 5/7 6', 10', 24', 27', 31'; Brown 1/1 31'; Southwell 1/1 46'

Santos National Football Stadium, Port Moresby
Referee: (Australia)

Prime Minister's XIII
2024 squad		Coaching staff
1 Teagan Berry – FB; 2 Abbi Church – WG; 3 Rory Owen – CE; 4 Jaime Chapman – CE; 5 Keele Browne – WG; 6 Jesse Southwell – FE; 7 Kirra Dibb – HB; 8 Lily Peacock – PR; 9 Emma Manzelmann – HK; 10 Sophie Holyman – PR; 11 Shaylee Bent – SR; 12 Kezie Apps (c) – SR; 13 Bree Chester – LK	14 Chante Temara – HK; 15 Ella Koster – SR; 16 Grace Kemp – PR; 17 Lauren Brown – HB; 18 Monalisa Soliola – SR; 19 Kasey Reh – HB; 20 Krystal Blackwell – WG	Head coach: Brad Donald; Legend: (c) Captain(s); (vc) Vice-captain(s)

=== 2025 ===
12 October 2025
13:00 PST

PNG PM's XIII (Papua New Guinea)	0–50	(Australia) Australian PM's XIII
	1st: 0-20; 2nd: 0-30	Tries: 10; Hippi 3 7', 12', 64'; Turnbull 3 26', 36', 46'; Weale 32'; Dodd 42'; Church 57'; Robinson 69'; Goals: 5 Dibb 3/6; Hannaway 2/4

Santos National Football Stadium, Port Moresby
Referee: (Australia)

Prime Minister's XIII
2025 squad		Coaching staff
1 Abbi Church – FB; 2 Andie Robinson – WG; 3 Jaime Chapman – CE; 4 Jasmine Peters – CE; 5 Phoenix-Raine Hippi – WG; 6 Kasey Reh – FE; 7 Kirra Dibb – HB; 8 Lillian Yarrow – PR; 9 Quincy Dodd (c) – HK; 10 Sophie Holyman (c) – PR; 11 Chloe Jackson – SR; 12 Shaylee Bent – SR; 13 Bree Chester – LK	14 Georgia Hannaway – FE; 15 Kayla Romaniuk – LK; 16 Makenzie Weale – PR; 17 Madison Mulhall – PR; 18 Shenai Lendill – SR; 19 Caitlin Turnbull – WG; 20 Tori Shipton – HK	Head coach: Jess Skinner; Legend: (c) Captain(s); (vc) Vice-captain(s)

=== 2026 ===
3 October 2026
13:00 PST

PNG PM's XIII (Papua New Guinea)	6-66	(Australia) Australian PM's XIII
Tries: 1 Howard 8'; Goals: 1 Walker 1/1 10'	1st: 0-28; 2nd: 6-38; Report	Tries: 12; Taylor 3 4', 17', 45'; Todhunter 3 28', 33', 49'; Robinson 13'; Preston 38'; Morrissey 52'; O'Brien 54'; Reh 60'; Owen 64'; Goals: 9 Preston 5/7 39', 50', 53', 55', 61'; Hannaway 4/5 6', 19', 30', 35'

Santos National Football Stadium, Port Moresby
Referee: (Australia) Ziggy Przeklasa-Adamski
Video referee: Peter Gough
Touch judges: Chrisallan Nana, Albert Muri

== Players ==
=== Captains ===
- Luke Ricketson (2005)
- Steve Price (2006)
- Mark Gasnier (2007)
- Nathan Hindmarsh (2008, 2011)
- Johnathan Thurston (2009)
- Corey Parker (2010)
- Scott Prince (2012)
- Robbie Farah (2013)
- Greg Bird (2014)
- Trent Merrin (2015)
- Greg Inglis (2016)
- Aaron Woods (2017)
- Daly Cherry-Evans (2018, 2022)
- Wade Graham (2019)
- Cameron Murray (2023)
- Damien Cook (2024)
- Keaon Koloamatangi (2025)

== Coaches ==
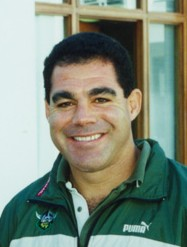
Mal Meninga previously coached the Prime Minister's XIII

- Mal Meninga (2005–2012, 2016–23)
- Laurie Daley (2013–2014)
- Ivan Cleary (2015)
- Brad Fittler (2024)
- Kevin Walters (2025)

== Records ==
=== Team ===
- Largest winning margins
  - 58 58–0 vs PNG PM's XIII, National Football Stadium – 24 September 2016.
  - 50 64–14 vs PNG PM's XIII, Suncorp Stadium – 25 September 2022.
  - 42 52–10 v Fiji PM's XIII, ANZ National Stadium – 11 October 2019.
  - 40 50–10 vs PNG PM's XIII, Kalabond Oval – 29 September 2013.
  - 40 48–8 vs PNG PM's XIII, National Football Stadium – 23 September 2017.

=== Individual ===
- Most games
  - 6 Jake Trbojevic (2015–19, 2023)
  - 5 Robbie Farah (2006, 2008–09, 2013–14)
  - 5 Aaron Woods (2012, 2014, 2016–18)
  - 5 Ben Hunt (2014, 2018–19, 2022–23)
- Most tries
  - 6 Jarryd Hayne
  - 5 Michael Jennings
  - 4 Blake Ferguson
  - 4 Chris Lawrence
  - 4 Trai Fuller
- Most points
  - 40 Zac Lomax
  - 24 Jarryd Hayne
  - 22 Mitchell Moses
  - 20 Michael Jennings
  - 20 Scott Prince
- Most tries in a match
  - 4 Trai Fuller (2025)
  - 3 Michael Jennings (2009)
  - 3 Mitchell Moses (2016)
  - 3 Tom Trbojevic (2017)
  - 3 James Tedesco (2017)
  - 3 Clinton Gutherson (2019)
- Most points in a match
  - 18 Mitchell Moses (2016)
  - 16 Aidan Sezer (2013)
  - 16 James Maloney (2017)
  - 16 Trai Fuller (2025)
  - 14 Johnathan Thurston (2007)

== See also ==
- Australia national rugby league team
- Australian Aboriginal rugby league team
- Junior Kangaroos
- Australian Schoolboys rugby league team
