= Amelia Mafi =

Tonga international rugby league footballer

Amelia Huakau
Personal information
- Born: Amelia Mafi; 22 June 1995 (age 31) South Auckland, New Zealand
- Height: 176 cm (5 ft 9 in)
- Weight: 69 kg (10 st 12 lb)

Playing information
- Position: Prop
Club
Years	Team	Pld	T	G	FG	P
2020	Sydney Roosters	1	0	0	0	0
2023	Parramatta Eels	9	1	0	0	4
2025	Wests Tigers	11	0	0	0	0
2026–	St. George Illawarra Dragons	9	0	0	0	0
	Total	30	1	0	0	4
Representative
Years	Team	Pld	T	G	FG	P
2022–	Tonga	3	0	0	0	0
- Source: RLP As of 31 October 2026

Amelia Huakau (née Mafi; born 22 June 1995) is a New Zealand rugby league footballer who plays as a prop for the Parramatta Eels in the NRL Women's Premiership, Wentworthville Magpies in the NSWRL Women's Premiership and has represented Tonga internationally.

== Background ==
Born in South Auckland, Mafi is of Tongan descent and played her junior rugby league for the Wentworthville Magpies.

== Playing career ==
=== 2018 ===
In 2018, Mafi played for Penrith Brothers in the NSWRL Women's Premiership. In 2019, she joined the Wentworthville Magpies.

=== 2019 ===
In July 2019, she joined the Sydney Roosters NRL Women's Premiership team but did not play a game due to injury. In Round 3 of the 2020 NRLW season, she made her debut for the Roosters in a 24–16 loss to the Brisbane Broncos.

=== 2023 ===
She played for Parramatta Eels in 2023 before joining the Wests Tigers for the 2024 season after recently marrying.
