= Parramatta Eels Women =

Australian rugby league football club

Parramatta Eels
Club information
- Full name: Parramatta Eels Rugby League Club
- Nickname(s): Eels, Parra, Blue and Gold
- Colours: Blue; Gold
- Founded: 4 November 1946 as Parramatta (Club); 27 February 2022 (Women)
- Website: parraeels.com.au

Current details
- Ground: Western Sydney Stadium (30,000)
- CEO: Jim Sarantinos
- Chairman: Sean McElduff
- Coach: Steve Georgallis
- Captain: Mahalia Murphy
- Competition: NRL Women's Premiership
- 2026 season: 5th
- Current season

Uniforms
Home colours	Away colours

Records
- Premierships: 0
- Runners-up: 1 (2022)
- Minor premierships: 0
- Biggest win: Eels 46 – 12 Raiders; GIO Stadium (19 Jul 2025)
- Biggest loss: Eels 6 – 56 Sharks; GIO Stadium (17 Sep 2023)
- First game: Eels 13 – 12 Knights; McDonald Jones Stadium (27 Feb 2022)
- Wooden spoons: 1 (2023)
- Most capped: 48 – Abbi Church
- Highest try scorer: 17 – Rory Owen
- Highest points scorer: 196 – Rachael Pearson

Parramatta Eels Women are a rugby league team, representing the Parramatta region of Sydney. The team is part of the Parramatta Eels club and plays in the National Rugby League Women's Premiership. The club announced their first player signings in late June 2021.

== Seasons ==
The Parramatta Eels Women's team entered the National Rugby League Women's Premiership in the postponed 2021 season on 27 February 2022.

Season	Regular season								Finals		Ref
Season	P	W	D	L	F	A	Pts	Pos	Top	Placing	Ref
2021	5	2	0	3	59	93	4	5th	4	—	
2022	5	1	0	4	86	109	2	4th	4	Runners-up	
2023	9	1	0	8	104	310	2	10th	4	—	
2024	9	5	0	4	160	184	10	5th	4	—	
2025	11	5	0	6	202	234	10	7th	6	—	
2026	11	4	0	7	198	314	8	8th	6	—	

=== 2026 Draw ===
The draw for the 2026 season was announced on 14 November 2025.

Round	Opponent	Score	Date	Time	Venue	
1	Tigers	16–28	Sun 5 Jul 2026	11:50 AM	Home	CommBank Stadium
2	Dragons	8–22	Sun 12 Jul 2026	1:45 PM	Away	WIN Stadium
3	Titans	12–50	Sun 19 Jul 2026	11:50 AM	Away	Cbus Super Stadium
4	Warriors	12–14	Sun 26 Jul 2026	12:00 PM	Home	Eric Tweedale Stadium
5	Knights	12–32	Sun 2 Aug 2026	4:00 PM	Neutral	Geohex Stadium, Wagga Wagga
6	Roosters	6–46	Sun 9 Aug 2026	6:15 PM	Away	Polytec Stadium
7	Bulldogs	30–18	Sat 15 Aug 2026	3:15 PM	Home	CommBank Stadium
8	Sharks	42–16	Sun 23 Aug 2026	6:15 PM	Away	Sharks Stadium
9	Broncos	10–44	Sun 30 Aug 2026	1:45 PM	Home	CommBank Stadium
10	Raiders	17–16	Sun 6 Sep 2026	6:15 PM	Away	GIO Stadium
11	Cowboys	33–28	Sat 12 Sep 2026	12:00 PM	Home	CommBank Stadium

== Head-to-head records ==
Opponent	First Meeting	P	W	D	L	PF	PA	Win %	Share %
Knights	27 Feb 2022	7	1	0	6	79	198	14.29%	28.52%
Dragons	6 Mar 2022	6	1	0	5	56	138	16.67%	28.87%
Titans	13 Mar 2022	6	2	0	4	98	156	33.33%	38.58%
Roosters	20 Mar 2022	7	1	0	6	106	247	14.29%	30.03%
Broncos	27 Mar 2022	6	2	0	4	80	168	33.33%	32.26%
Tigers	23 Jul 2023	4	2	0	2	74	78	50.00%	48.68%
Raiders	20 Aug 2023	4	3	0	1	103	72	75.00%	58.86%
Cowboys	26 Aug 2023	4	3	0	1	79	60	75.00%	56.83%
Sharks	17 Sep 2023	4	2	0	2	82	106	50.00%	43.62%
Warriors	13 Jul 2025	2	0	0	2	12	28	0.00%	30.00%
Bulldogs	12 Sep 2025	2	2	0	0	76	32	100.00%	70.37%
Totals	27 Feb 2022	52	19	0	33	845	1283	36.54%	39.71%

Notes

- Share % is the percentage of points For over the sum of points For and Against.
- Clubs listed in the order than the Eels Women first played them.
- As of 12 September 2026 (after Round 11)

== Coaches ==
As of 8 September 2026

Coach	Season Span	M	W	D	L	For	Agst	Win %	Share %
Dean Widders	2021–2023	21	5	0	16	285	551	23.81%	34.09%
Steve Georgallis	2024–present	31	14	0	17	560	732	45.16%	43.34%

== Captains ==
All players that have captained the Parramatta Eels NRLW team.
As of 12 September 2026

C#	Name	Years as Captain	Debut		Games as Captain			Games for Club	Ref
C#	Name	Years as Captain	Date	Round	Solo	Joint	Total	Games for Club	Ref
1	Simaima Taufa	2021–2022	27 Feb 2022	1	7	5	12	12	
2	Tiana Penitani Gray	2022	20 Aug 2022	1	0	5	5	10	
3	Kennedy Cherrington	2023	23 Jul 2023	1	3	2	5	34	
4	Rachael Pearson	2023	12 Aug 2023	4	4	2	6	36	
5	Mahalia Murphy	2024–present	27 Jul 2024	1	28	0	28	37	
6	Abbi Church	2025	3 Jul 2025	1	3	0	3	47	

== Current squad ==
The team is coached by Steve Georgallis. Jersey numbers in the table reflect the team list announced for Round 11.
Table last updated on 12 September 2026 (after Round 11).

J#	Player	Age	Position(s)	NRLW seasons				NRLW stats					Origin	Tests	All Stars
J#	Player	Age	Position(s)	Debut	2018-24	2025	2026	M	T	G	Pts	Prems	Origin	Tests	All Stars
1	Abbi Church	28	Fullback	2021	26	11	11	48	11	0	44	—	6	1	—
2	Zali Fay	25	Wing	2022	24	9	8	41	10	0	40	—	—	—	5
3	Rory Owen	22	Centre	2024	9	5	10	24	17	0	68	—	5	—	—
4	Jasmin Morrissey	23	Centre, Wing	2025	—	1	8	9	2	0	8	—	—	—	—
5	Freedom Crichton Ropati	18	Wing	2026	—	—	1	1	0	0	0	—	—	—	—
6	Cassey Tohi-Hiku	22	Five-eighth, Centre	2022	22	5	9	36	4	0	16	—	—	2	—
7	Rachael Pearson	33	Halfback	2021	12 15	11	10	48	6	107	241	—	5	—	—
8	Elsie Albert	30	Prop	2020	15 10	10	11	46	11	0	44	—	—	12	—
9	Layne Morgan	27	Halfback	2026	—	RU	5	5	0	0	0	—	—	—	—
10	Boss Kapua	21	Prop, Second-row	2023	5	5	9	19	1	1	6	—	—	—	—
11	Chloe Jackson	22	Second-row	2024	8	11	8	27	3	0	12	—	—	—	—
12	Mahalia Murphy	32	Second-row	2020	3 18	8	11	40	11	0	44	—	1	3	6
13	Keilee Joseph	24	Lock, Prop	2021	22 10	13	8	53	7	0	28	1 1	9	9	6
14	Taneka Todhunter	24	Hooker, Halfback	2023	13	8	9	30	2	0	8	—	—	—	2
15	Ryvrr-Lee Alo	20	Prop, Lock	2025	—	10	10	20	2	0	8	—	—	1 2	—
16	Fontayne Tufuga	19	Second-row	2025	—	2	8	10	0	0	0	—	—	—	—
17	Kennedy Cherrington	27	Lock, Prop	2020	4 23	6	5	38	5	0	20	—	9	6	5
18	Rueben Cherrington	23	Hooker, Lock	2022	12	11	7	30	5	1	22	—	—	—	2
19	Khyliah Gray	19	Lock, Five-eighth	2026	—	R	5	5	0	0	0	—	—	—	—
20	Tess McWilliams	20	Prop	2025	—	9	7	16	1	0	4	—	—	—	—
21	Fleur Ginn	20	Wing, Centre	2025	—	11	4	15	3	0	12	—	—	2	—
22	Kate Fallon	22	Centre	—	—	P	—	0	0	0	0	—	—	1	—
–	Rosemarie Beckett	23	Five-eighth, Fullback	2023	10	4	4	18	5	0	20	—	—	—	—
–	Rysh'e Fa'amausili	23	Centre	2025	—	2	—	3	0	0	0	—	—	—	—
–	Kiana Takairangi	34	Wing, Centre	2019	2 6 5	2	—	15	9	0	36	1	—	2 8	1
IJ	Jayde Herdegen	21	Halfback, Five-eighth	2026	—	R	3	3	0	0	0	—	—	—	—
IJ	Lindsay Tui	21	Centre	2022	7	11	6	24	0	0	0	—	—	6	—
C	Martha Mataele	27	Wing, Centre	2025	—	11	9	20	9	0	36	—	—	2	—
DV	Aaliyah Soufan	18	Halfback	—	—	R	—	0	0	0	0	—	—	—	—
DV	Tia Matthews	19	Second-row	—	—	—	—	0	0	0	0	—	—	—	—
DV	Taylah Falaniko	19	Prop	—	—	U	—	0	0	0	0	—	—	—	—

Notes:

- Khyliah Gray and Kiana Takairangi were signed on supplementary contracts for 2026.
- The following were signed on development contracts for 2026:
  - Freedom Crichton Ropati
  - Taylah Falaniko
  - Tia Matthews
  - Aaliyah Soufan

The Parramatta Eels announced contract extensions in several instalments from July 2025. The Parramatta Eels announced player signings in several instalments from October 2025.

=== Players out ===
Off contract

- Kate Fallon
- Zali Fay
- Martha Mataele
- Taneka Todhunter
- Rosemarie Beckett (CO)
- Khyliah Gray (Sup)
- Mahalia Murphy (CO)

==== Off contract after 2027 ====
- Elsie Albert
- Ryvrr-Lee Alo
- Kennedy Cherrington
- Rueben Cherrington
- Fleur Ginn
- Jayde Herdegen
- Chloe Jackson
- Keilee Joseph
- Boss Kapua
- Tess McWilliams
- Layne Morgan
- Jasmin Morrissey
- Rory Owen
- Rachael Pearson
- Lindsay Tui

== Individual awards ==
The Parramatta Eels player of the year and other club award winners since 2021.

Season	Player of the Year	Player's Player	Blue & Gold Army Members' Award	Coach's Award	Rookie of the Year	Community Award	Ref
2021	Botille Vette-Welsh	Simaima Taufa	—	Shirley Mailangi	—	—	
2022	Kennedy Cherrington & Simaima Taufa	Simaima Taufa	Tiana Penitani	Kennedy Cherrington	—	Kennedy Cherrington	
2023	Abbi Church	Cassey Tohi-Hiku	Abbi Church	Mahalia Murphy	—	Shontelle Stowers	
2024	Elsie Albert	Abbi Church	Abbi Church	Rachael Pearson	Rory Owen	Mahalia Murphy	
2025	Abbi Church	Martha Mataele	Abbi Church	Chloe Jackson	Martha Mataele	Elsie Albert	
2026	Abbi Church	Abbi Church	Abbi Church	Rory Owen	Jasmin Morrissey	Martha Mataele	

== Club records ==
Win loss record since entering the NRLW in 2021

Games	Wins	Drawn	Loss	Points For	Points Against	+/-	Win %
52	19	0	33	845	1,283	–438	36.54%

=== Player records ===
Lists and tables last updated: 12 September 2026 (after Round 11).

==== Career records (at the Eels) ====
===== Most games for the Eels =====
Qualification: 20 games

Rank	Player	Span	Games
1	Abbi Church	2021–present	48
2	Zali Fay	2022–present	41
3	Mahalia Murphy	2023–present	37
4	Cassey Tohi-Hiku	2022–present	36
4	Rachael Pearson	2023–present	36
6	Kennedy Cherrington	2021–present	34
7	Elsie Albert	2023–present	31
8	Rueben Cherrington	2022–present	30
8	Taneka Todhunter	2023–present	30
10	Chloe Jackson	2024–present	27
11	Lindsay Tui	2023–present	24
11	Rory Owen	2024–present	24
13	Martha Mataele	2025–present	20
13	Ryvrr-Lee Alo	2025–present	20

===== Most points for the Eels =====
Qualification: 20 points

Rank	Player	2026 Club	M	T	G	FG	Points
1	Rachael Pearson		36	5	87	2	196
2	Rory Owen		24	17	0	0	68
3	Abbi Church		48	11	0	0	44
3	Mahalia Murphy		37	11	0	0	44
5	Zali Fay		41	10	0	0	40
6	Martha Mataele		20	9	0	0	36
7	Tayla Preston		6	1	15	0	34
8	Elsie Albert		31	8	0	0	32
8	Monique Donovan	—	15	8	0	0	32
10	Rueben Cherrington		30	5	1	0	22
11	Kennedy Cherrington		34	5	0	0	20
11	Simaima Taufa		12	5	0	0	20
11	Rosemarie Beckett		18	5	0	0	20
11	Kimberley Hunt	R	7	5	0	0	20

===== Most tries for the Eels =====
Qualification: 5 tries

Rank	Player	Tries
1	Rory Owen	17
2	Abbi Church	11
2	Mahalia Murphy	11
4	Zali Fay	10
5	Martha Mataele	9
6	Elsie Albert	8
6	Monique Donovan	8
8	Kennedy Cherrington	5
8	Simaima Taufa	5
8	Rueben Cherrington	5
8	Rachael Pearson	5
8	Rosemarie Beckett	5
8	Kimberley Hunt	5

===== Most goals for the Eels =====
All goal kickers

Rank	Player	Goals
1	Rachael Pearson	87
2	Tayla Preston	15
3	Maddie Studdon	7
4	Brooke Walker	2
5	Pihuka Berryman-Duff	1
6	Rueben Cherrington	1
7	Boss Kapua	1

===== Most field goals for the Eels =====
Three instances to date

Rank	Player	Field goals
1	Rachael Pearson	2
2	Maddie Studdon	1

==== Season records ====
Season length has increased over time as the competition has expanded.

===== Most points in a season for the Eels =====
Qualification: 16 points

Rank	Player	Season	M	T	G	FG	Points
1	Rachael Pearson	2025	11	3	27	0	66
2	Rachael Pearson	2026	10	1	26	2	58
3	Rachael Pearson	2024	9	1	22	0	48
4	Rory Owen	2026	10	10	0	0	40
5	Tayla Preston	2022	6	1	15	0	34
6	Martha Mataele	2025	11	7	0	0	28
7	Rachael Pearson	2023	6	0	12	0	24
8	Kimberley Hunt	2023	7	5	0	0	20
8	Monique Donovan	2024	9	5	0	0	20
8	Rory Owen	2024	9	5	0	0	20
11	Maddie Studdon	2021	5	1	7	1	19
12	Simaima Taufa	2022	7	4	0	0	16
12	Rosemarie Beckett	2024	8	4	0	0	16
12	Rueben Cherrington	2025	11	4	0	0	16

===== Most tries in a season for the Eels =====
Qualification: 4 tries

Rank	Player	Season	M	Tries
1	Rory Owen	2026	10	10
2	Martha Mataele	2025	11	7
3	Kimberley Hunt	2023	7	5
3	Monique Donovan	2024	9	5
3	Rory Owen	2024	9	5
6	Simaima Taufa	2022	7	4
6	Rosemarie Beckett	2024	8	4
6	Rueben Cherrington	2025	11	4
6	Zali Fay	2026	8	4

==== Match records ====
===== Most points in a game for the Eels =====
Qualification: 10 points

Rank	Player	Date	Opponent	Venue	T	G	FG	Points
1	Rachael Pearson	19 Jul 2025	Raiders	GIO Stadium	1	7	0	18
2	Rachael Pearson	12 Sep 2025	Bulldogs	CommBank Stadium	1	5	0	14
2	Rachael Pearson	15 Aug 2026	Bulldogs	CommBank Stadium	1	5	0	14
2	Rachael Pearson	23 Aug 2026	Sharks	Ocean Protect Stadium	0	7	0	14
5	Martha Mataele	7 Sep 2025	Tigers	CommBank Stadium	3	0	0	12
5	Tayla Preston	25 Sep 2022	Roosters	Suncorp Stadium	1	4	0	12
7	Rachael Pearson	3 Jul 2025	Sharks	Sharks Stadium	1	3	0	10
7	Rachael Pearson	7 Sep 2025	Tigers	CommBank Stadium	0	5	0	10

===== Most tries in a game for the Eels =====
Qualification: 2 tries

Rank	Player	Date	Opponent	Venue	Tries
1	Martha Mataele	7 Sep 2025	Tigers	CommBank Stadium	3
2	Rikeya Horne	4 Sep 2022	Knights	McDonald Jones Stadium	2
2	Zali Fay	23 Jul 2023	Tigers	CommBank Stadium	2
2	Kimberley Hunt	26 Aug 2023	Cowboys	Netstrata Jubilee Stadium	2
2	Rosemarie Beckett	11 Aug 2024	Cowboys	Totally Workwear Stadium	2
2	Elsie Albert	8 Sep 2024	Titans	Eric Tweedale Stadium	2
2	Chloe Jackson	3 Jul 2025	Sharks	Sharks Stadium	2
2	Rory Owen	19 Jul 2025	Raiders	GIO Stadium	2
2	Mahalia Murphy	7 Sep 2025	Tigers	CommBank Stadium	2
2	Abbi Church	12 Sep 2025	Bulldogs	CommBank Stadium	2
2	Kiana Takairangi	12 Sep 2025	Bulldogs	CommBank Stadium	2
2	Elsie Albert	19 Jul 2026	Titans	Cbus Stadium	2
2	Rory Owen	23 Aug 2026	Sharks	Ocean Protect Stadium	2
2	Zali Fay	23 Aug 2026	Sharks	Ocean Protect Stadium	2
2	Rory Owen	6 Sep 2026	Raiders	GIO Stadium	2
2	Keilee Joseph	12 Sep 2026	Cowboys	CommBank Stadium	2
2	Rory Owen	12 Sep 2026	Cowboys	CommBank Stadium	2

===== Most goals in a game for the Eels =====
Qualification: 4 goals

Rank	Player	Date	Opponent	Venue	Goals
1	Rachael Pearson	19 Jul 2025	Raiders	GIO Stadium	7
1	Rachael Pearson	23 Aug 2026	Sharks	Ocean Protect Stadium	7
3	Rachael Pearson	7 Sep 2025	Tigers	CommBank Stadium	5
3	Rachael Pearson	12 Sep 2025	Bulldogs	CommBank Stadium	5
3	Rachael Pearson	15 Aug 2026	Bulldogs	CommBank Stadium	5
6	Tayla Preston	18 Sep 2022	Broncos	Central Coast Stadium	4
6	Tayla Preston	25 Sep 2022	Roosters	Suncorp Stadium	4
6	Rachael Pearson	8 Sep 2024	Titans	Eric Tweedale Stadium	4
6	Rachael Pearson	12 Sep 2026	Cowboys	CommBank Stadium	4

==== Oldest and youngest players ====
The oldest and youngest players to represent the Parramatta Eels Women's team in the NRLW.

Name	Age	Year
Shontelle Stowers	36 and 257 days	2023
Losana Lutu	18 and 111 days	2022

==== First try and last try ====
Who scored the first try and most recent try for the Eels.

Name	Year	Round	Minute	Opponent
Tiana Penitani-Gray	2021	1	30'	Knights
Rory Owen	2026	11	67'	Cowboys

=== Margins and streaks ===
Biggest winning margins
Qualification: 10 point margin

Margin	Score	Opponent	Venue	Date	Round
34	46—12	Raiders	GIO Stadium	19 Jul 2025	3
34	38—4	Tigers	CommBank Stadium	7 Sep 2025	10
32	46—14	Bulldogs	CommBank Stadium	12 Sep 2025	11
26	42—16	Sharks	Ocean Protect Stadium	23 Aug 2026	8
14	24—10	Roosters	Suncorp Stadium	25 Sep 2022	Semi Final
14	20—6	Cowboys	Totally Workwear Stadium	11 Aug 2024	3
12	28—16	Broncos	Central Coast Stadium	18 Sep 2022	5
12	22—10	Broncos	Suncorp Stadium	27 Jul 2024	1
12	30—18	Bulldogs	CommBank Stadium	15 Aug 2026	7
10	24—14	Titans	CommBank Stadium	13 Mar 2022	3
10	24—14	Titans	Eric Tweedale Stadium	8 Sep 2024	7

Biggest losing margins
Qualification: 24 point margin

Margin	Score	Opponent	Venue	Date	Round
50	6—56	Sharks	GIO Stadium	17 Sep 2023	9
44	12—56	Roosters	CommBank Stadium	23 Aug 2025	8
40	6—46	Roosters	Polytec Stadium	9 Aug 2026	6
38	12—50	Titans	Cbus Stadium	19 Jul 2026	3
34	4—38	Broncos	Suncorp Stadium	27 Mar 2022	5
34	4—38	Knights	CommBank Stadium	6 Aug 2023	3
34	12—46	Roosters	Industree Group Stadium	3 Sep 2023	7
34	4—38	Broncos	Suncorp Stadium	16 Aug 2025	7
34	10—44	Broncos	CommBank Stadium	30 Aug 2026	9
28	8—36	Tigers	CommBank Stadium	23 Jul 2023	1
28	14—42	Dragons	CommBank Stadium	31 Aug 2024	6
26	12—38	Dragons	WIN Stadium	29 Jul 2023	2
24	6—30	Knights	Eric Tweedale Stadium	27 Jul 2025	4

Most consecutive wins

- 2 — (18 September 2022 — 25 September 2022)
- 2 — (11 August 2024 — 18 August 2024)
- 2 — (8 September 2024 — 15 September 2024)
- 2 — (7 September 2025 — 12 September 2025)
- 2 — (15 August 2026 — 23 August 2026)
- 2 — (6 September 2028 — 12 September 2026)

Most consecutive losses

- 6 — (20 March 2022 — 10 September 2022)
- 6 — (2 October 2022, and 23 July 2023 to 20 August 2023)
- 6 — (5 July 2026 — 9 August 2026)

Biggest Comeback

- Recovered from 16 point deficit to win.
- Trailed North Queensland Cowboys 6-22 after 42 minutes at CommBank Stadium on September 12, 2026 and won 33-28.

Worst Collapse

- Surrendered 10 point lead
- Led North Queensland Cowboys 10-0 after 44 minutes at CommBank Stadium on August 10, 2025 and lost 10-14.

== History ==
=== First game and first win ===
Result	Score	Opponent	Venue	Date	Ref
Won	13–12	Newcastle Knights	McDonald Jones Stadium	27 Feb 2022	

=== First Team ===
The first ever Parramatta Eels team who played the Newcastle Knights on the 27th February 2022 at McDonald Jones Stadium. The Eels won the match 13-12.

Jersey	Position	Player
1	Fullback	Botille Vette-Welsh
2	Wing	Taina Naividi
3	Centre	Tiana Penitani-Gray
4	Centre	Jocephy Daniels
5	Wing	Rikeya Horne
6	Five-eighth	Sereana Naitokatoka
7	Halfback	Maddie Studdon
8	Prop	Kennedy Cherrington
9	Hooker	Nita Maynard-Perrin
10	Prop	Tommaya Kelly-Sines
11	Second-row	Ellie Johnston
12	Second-row	Jade Etherden
13	Lock	Simaima Taufa (c)
14	Hooker	Shirley Mailangi
15	Fullback	Abbi Church
16	Lock	Therese Aiton
17	Prop	Filomina Hanisi
	Coach	Dean Widders

=== Grand Final appearances ===
Result	Score	Opponent	Venue	Date	Ref
Lost	12–32	Newcastle Knights	Accor Stadium	2 Oct 2022	

== Players ==
The following players have appeared in NRL Women's Premiership matches for the Eels.
Table last updated: 12 September 2026 (after Round 11).

Order	Player	Eels					First Appearance
Order	Player	M	T	G	FG	Pts	Game	Date	Opponent
1	Botille Vette-Welsh	5	1	0	0	4	1	27 Feb 2022	Knights
2	Taina Naividi	5	0	0	0	0	1	27 Feb 2022	Knights
3	Tiana Penitani Gray	10	4	0	0	16	1	27 Feb 2022	Knights
4	Jocephy Daniels	3	0	0	0	0	1	27 Feb 2022	Knights
5	Rikeya Horne	11	3	0	0	12	1	27 Feb 2022	Knights
6	Sereana Naitokatoka	4	0	0	0	0	1	27 Feb 2022	Knights
7	Maddie Studdon	5	1	7	1	19	1	27 Feb 2022	Knights
8	Kennedy Cherrington	34	5	0	0	20	1	27 Feb 2022	Knights
9	Nita Maynard-Perrin	4	0	0	0	0	1	27 Feb 2022	Knights
10	Tommaya Kelly-Sines	4	0	0	0	0	1	27 Feb 2022	Knights
11	Ellie Johnston	12	2	0	0	8	1	27 Feb 2022	Knights
12	Jade Etherden	2	0	0	0	0	1	27 Feb 2022	Knights
13	Simaima Taufa	12	5	0	0	20	1	27 Feb 2022	Knights
14	Filomina Hanisi	12	0	0	0	0	1	27 Feb 2022	Knights
15	Seli Mailangi	12	1	0	0	4	1	27 Feb 2022	Knights
16	Therese Aiton	2	0	0	0	0	1	27 Feb 2022	Knights
17	Abbi Church	48	11	0	0	44	1	27 Feb 2022	Knights
18	Christian Pio	11	2	0	0	8	2	6 Mar 2022	Dragons
19	Jamie-Anne Wright	3	0	0	0	0	2	6 Mar 2022	Dragons
20	Emily Curtain	3	1	0	0	4	3	13 Mar 2022	Titans
21	Christine Pauli	2	0	0	0	0	4	20 Mar 2022	Roosters
22	Gayle Broughton	7	1	0	0	4	6	20 Aug 2022	Roosters
23	Tess Staines	3	1	0	0	4	6	20 Aug 2022	Roosters
24	Brooke-Morgan Walker	1	0	2	0	4	6	20 Aug 2022	Roosters
25	Losana Lutu	1	0	0	0	0	6	20 Aug 2022	Roosters
26	Vanessa Foliaki	7	1	0	0	4	6	20 Aug 2022	Roosters
27	Brooke Anderson	5	1	0	0	4	6	20 Aug 2022	Roosters
28	Najvada George	6	0	0	0	0	6	20 Aug 2022	Roosters
29	Rima Butler	5	1	0	0	4	6	20 Aug 2022	Roosters
30	Zali Fay	41	10	0	0	40	7	28 Aug 2022	Dragons
31	Tayla Preston	6	1	15	0	34	7	28 Aug 2022	Dragons
32	Ruby-Jean Kennard-Ellis	15	0	0	0	0	7	28 Aug 2022	Dragons
33	Ashleigh Quinlan	6	1	0	0	4	7	28 Aug 2022	Dragons
34	Rueben Cherrington	30	5	1	0	22	8	4 Sep 2022	Knights
35	Cassey Tohi-Hiku	36	4	0	0	16	9	10 Sep 2022	Titans
36	Mahalia Murphy	37	11	0	0	44	13	23 Jul 2023	Wests Tigers
37	Shontelle Stowers	2	0	0	0	0	13	23 Jul 2023	Wests Tigers
38	Pihuka Berryman-Duff	9	0	0	0	0	13	23 Jul 2023	Wests Tigers
39	Jade Fonua	14	0	0	0	0	13	23 Jul 2023	Wests Tigers
40	Madeline Jones	17	0	0	0	0	13	23 Jul 2023	Wests Tigers
41	Amelia Huakau	9	1	0	0	4	13	23 Jul 2023	Wests Tigers
42	Talesha O'Neill	9	0	0	0	0	13	23 Jul 2023	Wests Tigers
43	Kyra Simon	3	0	0	0	0	13	23 Jul 2023	Wests Tigers
44	Shannon Muru	4	0	0	0	0	13	23 Jul 2023	Wests Tigers
45	Monique Donovan	15	8	0	0	32	13	23 Jul 2023	Wests Tigers
46	Capri Paekau	5	0	0	0	0	13	23 Jul 2023	Wests Tigers
47	Rosemarie Beckett	18	5	0	0	20	14	29 Jul 2023	Dragons
48	Nakia Davis-Welsh	2	0	0	0	0	14	29 Jul 2023	Dragons
49	Kimberley Hunt	7	5	0	0	20	15	6 Aug 2023	Knights
50	Kelsey Clark	1	0	0	0	0	15	6 Aug 2023	Knights
51	Rachael Pearson	36	5	87	2	196	16	12 Aug 2023	Broncos
52	Elsie Albert	31	8	0	0	32	16	12 Aug 2023	Broncos
53	Tyla Amiatu	14	2	0	0	8	16	12 Aug 2023	Broncos
54	Taneka Todhunter	30	2	0	0	8	18	20 Aug 2023	Raiders
55	Lindsay Tui	24	0	0	0	0	18	26 Aug 2023	Cowboys
56	Boss Kapua	19	1	1	0	6	19	26 Aug 2023	Cowboys
57	Rory Owen	24	17	0	0	68	22	27 Jul 2024	Broncos
58	Rosie Kelly	9	1	0	0	4	22	27 Jul 2024	Broncos
59	Chloe Jackson	27	3	0	0	12	23	4 Aug 2024	Sharks
60	Tafao Asaua	2	0	0	0	0	25	18 Aug 2024	Wests Tigers
61	Breanna Eales	14	0	0	0	0	25	18 Aug 2024	Wests Tigers
62	Martha Mataele	20	9	0	0	36	31	3 Jul 2025	Sharks
63	Tess McWilliams	16	1	0	0	4	31	3 Jul 2025	Sharks
64	Paige Travis	11	0	0	0	0	31	3 Jul 2025	Sharks
65	Ryvrr-Lee Alo	20	2	0	0	8	31	3 Jul 2025	Sharks
66	Rysh'e Fa'amausili	3	0	0	0	0	31	3 Jul 2025	Sharks
67	Fleur Ginn	15	3	0	0	12	31	3 Jul 2025	Sharks
68	Mia Middleton	2	0	0	0	0	38	23 Aug 2025	Roosters
69	Kiana Takairangi	2	3	0	0	12	40	7 Sep 2025	Wests Tigers
70	Fontayne Tufuga	10	0	0	0	0	40	7 Sep 2025	Wests Tigers
71	Khyliah Gray	5	0	0	0	0	43	12 Jul 2026	Dragons
72	Keilee Joseph	8	3	0	0	12	45	26 Jul 2026	Warriors
73	Jasmin Morrissey	8	2	0	0	8	45	26 Jul 2026	Warriors
74	Jayde Herdegen	3	0	0	0	0	46	2 Aug 2026	Knights
75	Layne Morgan	5	0	0	0	0	48	15 Aug 2026	Bulldogs
76	Freedom Crichton Ropati	1	0	0	0	0	52	12 Sep 2026	Cowboys

== Representative honours ==
Player	Club Debut	Country	International Debut	Years	Ref
Elsie Albert	12 Aug 2023	Papua New Guinea	**22 Jun 2019**	2024–2025	
Ryvrr-Lee Alo	3 Jul 2025	Samoa	19 Oct 2025	2025	
Pihuka Berryman-Duff	23 Jul 2023	Samoa	15 Oct 2023	2023	
Kennedy Cherrington	27 Feb 2022	Australia	2 Nov 2022	2022–2023	
Abbi Church	27 Feb 2022	Australia	2 Nov 2025	2025	
Jade Fonua	23 Jul 2023	Tonga	21 Oct 2023	2023–2024	
Fleur Ginn	3 Jul 2025	Papua New Guinea	18 Oct 2025	2025	
Amelia Huakau	23 Jul 2023	Tonga	**25 Jun 2022**	2023	
Martha Mataele	3 Jul 2025	Tonga	25 Oct 2025	2025	
Mahalia Murphy	23 Jul 2023	Australia	**3 May 2015**	2024	
Shannon Muru	23 Jul 2023	Tonga	**25 Jun 2022**	2023	
Capri Paekau	23 Jul 2023	New Zealand	21 Oct 2023	2023	
Kiana Takairangi	7 Sep 2025	Cook Islands	**16 Nov 2017**	2025	
Simaima Taufa	27 Feb 2022	Australia	**9 Nov 2014**	2022	
Nita Maynard-Perrin	27 Feb 2022	New Zealand	**16 Nov 2017**	2022	
Cassey Tohi-Hiku	10 Sep 2022	Tonga	21 Oct 2023	2023–2024	
Lindsay Tui	26 Aug 2023	Samoa	15 Oct 2023	2023–2025	

Notes:

- International Debut dates in **bold** indicate that the player made her first international appearance prior to playing for the Parramatta Eels NRLW team.
- Paige Travis played for England on 1 March 2025 between signing-on to play for the Eels in November 2024 and making her Eels and NRLW debut in July 2025.
- Ryvrr-Lee Alo played for the Cook Islands in 2024, made her Eels NRLW debut in July 2025, then played for Samoa in October 2025.
- Kiana Takairangi played for New Zealand in 2019 between stints playing for the Cook Islands.

=== Women's State of Origin representatives ===
Past and current players that have played for Queensland and New South Wales in the State of Origin.

Player	State	Year(s)
Kennedy Cherrington	New South Wales	2023 , 2025
Abbi Church	New South Wales	2025
Tiana Penitani-Gray	New South Wales	2022
Rachael Pearson	New South Wales	2024
Simaima Taufa	New South Wales	2022
Rory Owen	Queensland	2025

=== Prime Minister's XIII representatives ===
Past and current players that have been selected to play in the Prime Minister's XIII.

Player	Year(s)
Kimberley Hunt	2023
Cassey Tohi-Hiku	2023
Rachael Pearson	2023
Kennedy Cherrington	2023
Taneka Todhunter	2023
Abbi Church	2023 – 2025
Rueben Cherrington	2023
Rory Owen	2024
Chloe Jackson	2025

=== All-Stars Representatives ===
Past and current players that have played for the Indigenous All-Stars or for the Māori All-Stars.

==== Indigenous All Stars ====
Player	Year(s)
Tommaya Kelly-Sines	2022
Monique Donovan	2024
Taneka Todhunter	2024 – 2025
Mahalia Murphy	2024 – 2025
Keilee Joseph	2026

==== Māori All Stars (Māori people) ====
Player	Year(s)
Botille Vette-Welsh	2022
Jocephy Daniels	2022
Kennedy Cherrington	2022, 2024 – 2026
Zali Fay	2023 – 2026
Rueben Cherrington	2025 – 2026

== Feeder team seasons ==
The Parramatta Eels run two women's pathways teams in the NSWRL Women's Premiership, and one team each in the Tarsha Gale Cup and Lisa Fiaola Cup.

=== NSWRL Women's Premiership ===
==== Parramatta Eels ====
Season	Regular season									Finals		Ref
Season	P	W	D	L	B	F	A	Pts	Pos	Top	Placing	Ref
2024	11	4	0	7	0	172	224	4	6th	4	—	
2025	11	8	0	3	0	228	168	16	5th	4	—	
2026	11	6	0	5	0	318	152	12	6th	5	—	

==== Wentworthville Magpies ====
Season	Regular season									Finals		Ref
Season	P	W	D	L	B	F	A	Pts	Pos	Top	Placing	Ref
2018	12	0	1	11	2	40	730	5	9th	5	—	
2019	10	4	6	6	6	184	194	20	7th	8	Elimination Semi-Finalist	
2020	6	0	1	5	1	32	120	3	7th	6	—	
2021	11	1	0	10	2	104	374	6	9th	6	—	
2022	8	0	0	8	1	74	228	2	9th	4	—	
2023	10	4	0	6	1	186	236	10	8th	4	—	
2024	11	10	0	1	0	302	106	20	1st	4	Semi-Finalist	
2025	11	3	1	9	1	161	298	3	11th	4	—	
2026	11	2	1	10	0	90	444	2	11th	5	—	

=== Tarsha Gale Cup ===
For Under 18 players from 2017 to 2020. Since 2021, the Cup is for Under 19 players.

Season	Regular season									Finals		Ref
Season	P	W	D	L	B	F	A	Pts	Pos	Top	Placing	Ref
2018	8	2	0	6	1	148	362	6	9th	8	—	
2019	9	6	0	3	0	222	168	12	5th	8	Semi-Finalist	
2020	6	1	1	4	0	58	118	3	8th	8	—	
2021	8	2	1	5	1	96	226	7	6th	6	—	
2022	8	6	1	1	1	194	72	15	2nd	6	Semi-Finalist	
2023	8	4	1	3	1	112	124	11	5th	6	Preliminary Semi-Finalist	
2024	8	4	0	4	1	166	142	10	8th	6	—	
2025	8	5	0	3	1	226	124	12	5th	8	Premiers	
2026	8	7	0	1	1	256	92	16	2nd	8	Premiers	

=== Lisa Fiaola Cup ===
For Under 17 players.

Season	Regular season									Finals		Ref
Season	P	W	D	L	B	F	A	Pts	Pos	Top	Placing	Ref
2024	8	6	0	2	1	232	90	14	3rd	6	Preliminary Semi-Finalist	
2025	8	6	0	2	1	224	122	14	3rd	8	Premiers	
2026	8	8	0	0	1	304	70	18	1st	8	Preliminary Finalist	
