= Mahalia Murphy =

Australia international dual-code rugby footballer

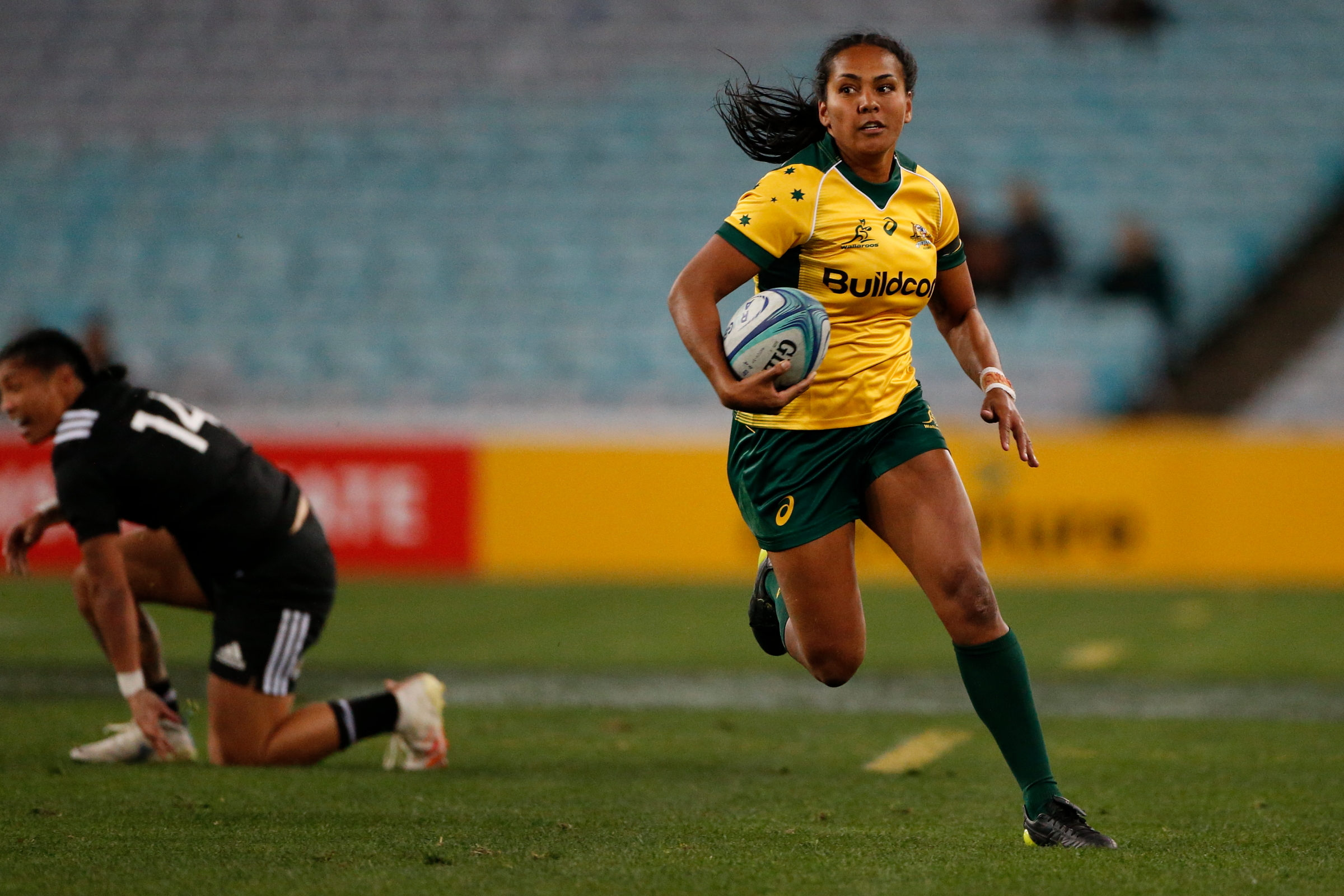
- Murphy playing for Australia against NZ, August 2018

Personal information
- Born: 19 January 1994 (age 32) Blacktown, New South Wales, Australia
- Height: 168 cm (5 ft 6 in)
- Weight: 73 kg (11 st 7 lb)

Playing information

Rugby union
- Position: Wing
Club
Years	Team	Pld	T	G	FG	P
2019–20	NSW Waratahs	5	2	0	0	10
Representative
Years	Team	Pld	T	G	FG	P
2017–18	Australia
2015–19	Australia 7s

Rugby league
- Position: Centre
Club
Years	Team	Pld	T	G	FG	P
2020–22	St George Illawarra Dragons	3	0	0	0	0
2023–	Parramatta Eels	37	11	0	0	44
	Total	40	11	0	0	44
Representative
Years	Team	Pld	T	G	FG	P
2013–15	Indigenous All Stars	2	0	0	0	0
2015	New South Wales	1	0	0	0	0
2015–2024	Australia	3	3	0	0	12
- Source: As of 6 November 2026

Mahalia Murphy (born 19 January 1994) is an Australian rugby league and rugby union footballer who captains the Parramatta Eels in the NRLW. She has represented Australia in both codes. Her primary position is second-row.

In 2015, she made her rugby league Test debut for Australia before switching to rugby union and representing Australia in 2017.

== Early life ==
Born in Blacktown, New South Wales, Murphy played her junior rugby league for the Doonside Roos and attended Hills Sports High School.

== Playing career ==
=== Rugby league ===
In 2013, while playing for the Redfern All Blacks, Murphy represented the Indigenous All Stars. On 3 May 2015, Murphy made her Test debut for Australia, scoring a hat-trick in a 22–14 win over New Zealand. In June 2015, she made her debut for New South Wales in a 4–all draw with Queensland.

On 24 September 2020, Murphy returned to rugby league, joining the St George Illawarra Dragons NRL Women's Premiership team. In Round 1 of the 2020 NRLW season, she made her debut for the Dragons, coming off the bench in a 18–4 loss to the Sydney Roosters.

=== Rugby union ===
In July 2015, Murphy represented Australia at the Pacific Games in Papua New Guinea. In 2017, she represented Australia at the 2017 Women's Rugby World Cup. In 2019, she joined the New South Wales Waratahs Super W team.

Murphy was named in Australia's squad for the 2022 Pacific Four Series in New Zealand. She made the Wallaroos squad for a two-test series against the Black Ferns at the Laurie O'Reilly Cup. She was also selected in the team for the delayed 2022 Rugby World Cup in New Zealand.
