= List of NRL Women's records =

List

This page details first-class rugby league records from the National Rugby League Women's Premiership.

== Team records ==
=== Team wins, losses, win percentage and draws ===
==== Matches played ====
All time ladder
Pos	Team	First game	Pld	W	D	L	PF	PA	Win%	Share %
1	Sydney Roosters	8 September 2018	71	53	0	18	1869	956	74.65%	66.16%
2	Brisbane Broncos	9 September 2018	70	51	0	19	1914	1032	72.86%	64.97%
3	Newcastle Knights	27 February 2022	58	35	0	23	1352	1012	60.34%	57.19%
4	Gold Coast Titans	27 February 2022	55	30	1	24	1033	985	55.45%	51.19%
5	Cronulla-Sutherland Sharks	23 July 2023	44	21	0	23	835	811	47.73%	50.73%
6	Canberra Raiders	23 July 2023	42	18	0	24	831	928	42.86%	47.24%
7	North Queensland Cowboys	22 July 2023	41	16	0	25	652	1059	39.02%	38.11%
8	New Zealand Warriors	8 September 2018	31	12	0	19	544	672	38.71%	44.74%
9	Parramatta Eels	27 February 2022	52	19	0	33	845	1283	36.54%	39.71%
10	St George Illawarra Dragons	9 September 2018	63	21	0	42	979	1356	33.33%	41.93%
11	Canterbury-Bankstown Bulldogs	4 July 2025	22	6	1	15	336	684	29.55%	32.94%
12	Wests Tigers	23 July 2023	41	12	0	29	583	995	29.27%	36.95%

Last updated: 5 October 2026 (after the Grand Final of the 2026 NRL Women's season)
Share % is the percentage of points For over the sum of points For and Against.

==== Most consecutive wins ====
- 18 — Sydney Roosters (1 September 2024 — 6 October 2024, 6 July 2025 — 27 September 2025)
- 14 — Brisbane Broncos (27 July 2025 — 5 October 2025, 4 July 2026 — 26 July 2026)
- 13 — Sydney Roosters (4 July 2026 — 4 October 2026) (current)
- 11 — Newcastle Knights (6 August 2023 – 1 October 2023, 25 July 2024 – 3 August 2024)

==== Most consecutive losses ====
- 14 — Wests Tigers (6 August 2023 — 14 September 2023, 28 July 2024 — 7 September 2024)

=== Premierships ===
Tally	Club	Seasons	Ref
4	Brisbane Broncos	2018, 2019, 2020, 2025	
3	Sydney Roosters	2021, 2024, 2026	
2	Newcastle Knights	2022, 2023	

==== Most consecutive ====
- 3 – Brisbane Broncos (2018 to 2020)
- 2 – Newcastle Knights (2022 to 2023)

=== Grand Final appearances ===
Tally	Club	Seasons
6	Sydney Roosters	2018, 2020, 2021, 2024, 2025, 2026
5	Brisbane Broncos	2018, 2019, 2020, 2025, 2026
2	Newcastle Knights	2022, 2023
2	St. George Illawarra Dragons	2019, 2021
1	Parramatta Eels	2022
1	Gold Coast Titans	2023
1	Cronulla-Sutherland Sharks	2024

==== Most consecutive ====
- 3 – Brisbane Broncos (2018 to 2020)
- 3 – Sydney Roosters (2024 to 2026)
- 2 – Newcastle Knights (2022 to 2023)
- 2 – Brisbane Broncos (2025 to 2026)

=== Runners-up ===
Tally	Club	Seasons
3	Sydney Roosters	2018, 2020, 2025
2	St. George Illawarra Dragons	2019, 2021
1	Parramatta Eels	2022
1	Gold Coast Titans	2023
1	Cronulla-Sutherland Sharks	2024
1	Brisbane Broncos	2026

=== Minor premierships ===
Tally	Club	Seasons
5	Brisbane Broncos	2018, 2019, 2020, 2021, 2024
3	Sydney Roosters	2022, 2025, 2026
1	Newcastle Knights	2023

==== Most consecutive ====
- 4 – Brisbane Broncos (2018 to 2021)

==== Wooden Spoons ====
Tally	Club	Seasons
3	St. George Illawarra Dragons	2018, 2020, 2026
2	Wests Tigers	2024, 2025
1	Sydney Roosters	2019
1	Parramatta Eels	2023
1	Newcastle Knights	2021
1	Gold Coast Titans	2022

==== Most consecutive ====
- 2 – Wests Tigers (2024 to 2025)

=== Result records ===
==== Greatest win margins ====
Rank	Margin	Winning team	Defeated team	Score	Venue	Date	Round	Ref
1	58	Sydney Roosters	New Zealand Warriors	66—8	Allianz Stadium	23 Aug 2026	8	NRL
1	58	Gold Coast Titans	Wests Tigers	58—0	Campbelltown Stadium	6 Sep 2026	10	NRL
3	50	Cronulla-Sutherland Sharks	Parramatta Eels	56—6	GIO Stadium	17 Sep 2023	9	NRL
3	50	Cronulla-Sutherland Sharks	Canberra Raiders	56—6	GIO Stadium	12 Jul 2025	2	NRL
3	50	Sydney Roosters	North Queensland Cowboys	56—6	Queensland Country Bank Stadium	5 Sep 2026	10	NRL
Last updated: 7 September 2026.

==== Most points scored in a game ====
Rank	Points	Winning team	Defeated team	Score	Venue	Date	Round	Ref
1	80	Canberra Raiders	Canterbury-Bankstown Bulldogs	56—24	Belmore Sports Ground	23 Aug 2025	8	NRL
2	78	Newcastle Knights	Canterbury-Bankstown Bulldogs	56—22	McDonald Jones Stadium	5 Sep 2026	10	NRL
3	74	Sydney Roosters	New Zealand Warriors	66—8	Allianz Stadium	23 Aug 2026	8	NRL
4	72	North Queensland Cowboys	St. George Illawarra Dragons	38—34	Queensland Country Bank Stadium	4 Aug 2024	2	NRL
4	72	Canberra Raiders	St. George Illawarra Dragons	38—34	Netstrata Jubilee Stadium	7 Sep 2024	7	NRL
4	72	Brisbane Broncos	Canberra Raiders	44—28	GIO Stadium	10 Aug 2025	6	NRL
4	72	Cronulla-Sutherland Sharks	New Zealand Warriors	40—32	Go Media Stadium	5 Sep 2026	10	NRL
8	70	Brisbane Broncos	New Zealand Warriors	52—18	Totally Workwear Stadium	13 Sep 2026	11	NRL
Last updated: 15 September 2026.

==== Fewest points scored in a game ====
Rank	Points	Winning team	Defeated team	Score	Venue	Date	Round	Ref
1	6	Canberra Raiders	Wests Tigers	6–0	Campbelltown Stadium	18 Sep 2026	EF	NRL
2	10	St. George Illawarra Dragons	Parramatta Eels	10—0	WIN Stadium	6 Mar 2022	2	NRL
2	10	Wests Tigers	Cronulla-Sutherland Sharks	10—0	Belmore Sports Ground	30 Jul 2023	2	NRL
Last updated: 18 September 2026.

==== Most points scored by one team in a game ====
Rank	Points	Winning team	Defeated team	Score	Venue	Date	Round	Ref
1	66	Sydney Roosters	New Zealand Warriors	66—8	Allianz Stadium	23 Aug 2026	8	NRL
2	58	Gold Coast Titans	Wests Tigers	58—0	Campbelltown Stadium	6 Sep 2026	10	NRL
3	56	Cronulla-Sutherland Sharks	Parramatta Eels	56—6	GIO Stadium	17 Sep 2023	9	NRL
3	56	Cronulla-Sutherland Sharks	Canberra Raiders	56—6	GIO Stadium	12 Jul 2025	2	NRL
3	56	Canberra Raiders	Canterbury-Bankstown Bulldogs	56—24	Belmore Sports Ground	23 Aug 2025	8	NRL
3	56	Sydney Roosters	Parramatta Eels	56—12	CommBank Stadium	23 Aug 2025	8	NRL
3	56	Sydney Roosters	North Queensland Cowboys	56—6	Queensland Country Bank Stadium	5 Sep 2026	10	NRL
3	56	Newcastle Knights	Canterbury-Bankstown Bulldogs	56—22	McDonald Jones Stadium	5 Sep 2026	10	NRL
Last updated: 7 September 2026.

==== Highest scores by a losing side ====
Rank	Points	Winning team	Defeated team	Score	Venue	Date	Round	Ref
1	34	North Queensland Cowboys	St. George Illawarra Dragons	38—34	Queensland Country Bank Stadium	4 Aug 2024	2	NRL
1	34	Canberra Raiders	St. George Illawarra Dragons	38—34	Netstrata Jubilee Stadium	7 Sep 2024	7	NRL
3	32	Cronulla-Sutherland Sharks	New Zealand Warriors	40—32	Go Media Stadium	5 Sep 2026	10	NRL
Last updated: 7 September 2026.

=== Season records ===
The season length has increased over time as the number of teams in the competition has expanded.

- 2018 to 2020 seasons — 3 games minimum, 4 maximum
- 2021 and 2022 seasons — 5 games minimum, 7 maximum
- 2023 and 2024 seasons — 9 games minimum, 11 maximum
- 2025 season — 11 games minimum, 14 maximum

The 2021 season was postponed due to the COVID-19 pandemic; it started on 27 February 2022 and was completed on 10 April 2022.

==== Best start to a season ====
- 13 wins by Sydney Roosters in 2026 (11 from 11 regular season round wins plus preliminary final and grand final wins)
- 12 wins by Sydney Roosters in 2025 (11 from 11 regular season round wins plus a preliminary final win)

==== Undefeated in a season ====
- 2026 Sydney Roosters (13 matches)
- 2018 Brisbane Broncos (4 matches)
- 2020 Brisbane Broncos (4 matches)

==== Failed to win a match in a season ====
- 2019 Sydney Roosters (3 matches)
- 2020 St. George Illawarra Dragons (3 matches)
- 2021 Newcastle Knights (5 matches)

==== Most points scored by a team in a season ====
- 484 points by the Sydney Roosters from 13 matches in 2026
- In shorter seasons:
  - 2018 to 2020: 110 points by the Brisbane Broncos from 4 matches in 2018
  - 2021 and 2022: 174 points by the Newcastle Knights from 7 matches in 2022
  - 2023 and 2024: 284 points by the Sydney Roosters from 10 matches in the postposed 2021 season

==== Fewest points scored by a team in a season ====
- By season length:
  - 2018 to 2020: 18 points by the St. George Illawarra Dragons from 3 matches in 2020
  - 2021 and 2022: 48 points by the Newcastle Knights from 5 matches in the postponed 2021 season
  - 2023 and 2024: 104 points by the Parramatta Eels from 9 matches in 2023
  - 2025 and 2026: 100 points by the Wests Tigers from 11 matches in 2025

==== Most points conceded by a team in a season ====
- 375 points by the North Queensland Cowboys from 11 matches in 2026
- In shorter seasons:
  - 2018 to 2020: 66 points by the St. George Illawarra Dragons, twice, from 3 matches in 2018 and from 4 matches in 2019
  - 2021 and 2022: 123 points by the Newcastle Knights from 5 matches in the postponed 2021 season
  - 2023 and 2024: 310 points by the Parramatta Eels from 9 matches in 2023

==== Fewest points conceded by a team in a season ====
- By season length:
  - 2018 to 2020: 20 points by the Brisbane Broncos from 4 matches in 2019
  - 2021 and 2022: 82 points, twice:
    - by the St. George Illawarra Dragons from 7 matches in the postponed 2021 season
    - by the Sydney Roosters from 6 matches in 2022
  - 2023 and 2024: 132 points by the Sydney Roosters from 10 matches in 2023
  - 2025 and 2026: 132 points by the Sydney Roosters from 13 matches in 2026

==== Keeping opposition scoreless: most games in a season ====
- 2 matches by the Cronulla-Sutherland Sharks in 2024, out of 11 matches.

== Individual playing records ==
=== Most games played ===
The following players have made 40 or more appearances in NRLW matches.
Table last updated 5 October 2026 (after the Grand Final of the 2026 season).

R	Player	Debut	Seasons	Matches	2018	2019	2020	2021	2022	2023	2024	2025	2026
1	Chelsea Lenarduzzi	2018	9	69	4	3	4	6	5	10	10	13	14
1	Keeley Nizza	2018	9	69	3	4	3	7	6	9	11	13	13
3	Isabelle Kelly	2018	9	68	4	3	2	7	6	10	11	12	13
4	Ali Brigginshaw	2018	9	67	4	4	4	6	5	10	10	13	11
5	Zahara Temara	2018	9	65	4	3	4	7	6	9	9	10	13
6	Jocelyn Kelleher	2020	7	64	—	—	3	7	6	10	11	13	13
6	Tamika Upton	2019	8	64	—	3	4	4	5	11	10	13	14
8	Shaylee Bent	2019	8	63	—	4	2	7	6	11	9	12	12
9	Georgia Hale	2018	9	62	3	3	3	5	5	11	9	11	12
10	Olivia Kernick	2021	6	60	—	—	—	7	6	10	11	13	13
10	Raecene McGregor	2018	9	60	3	4	4	7	5	9	9	7	12
10	Julia Robinson	2018	9	60	4	3	4	2	5	6	10	12	14
13	Olivia Higgins	2021	6	59	—	—	—	7	7	11	10	12	12
13	Jessica Sergis	2018	9	59	3	4	3	6	6	6	5	13	13
13	Simaima Taufa	2018	9	59	4	2	4	5	7	9	8	11	10
13	Romy Teitzel	2023	7	59	—	—	1	5	7	10	9	13	14
17	Ellie Johnston	2020	7	58	—	—	3	5	7	9	11	13	10
17	Shanice Parker	2019	7	58	—	1	4	—	7	11	10	13	12
17	Sarah Togatuki	2018	8	58	3	—	4	7	5	7	9	11	12
20	Lauren Brown	2020	7	57	—	—	4	6	5	11	7	12	12
20	Kirra Dibb	2019	8	57	—	3	3	5	7	9	9	9	12
20	Holli Wheeler	2018	8	57	3	4	—	7	6	7	10	9	11
23	Tarryn Aiken	2019	8	56	—	4	4	6	5	10	9	7	11
23	Tallisha Harden	2018	9	56	1	3	4	6	4	9	9	11	9
23	Tiana Penitani Gray	2019	8	56	—	4	2	5	5	9	11	12	8
23	Tayla Predebon	2021	6	56	—	—	—	7	7	11	9	12	10
27	Quincy Dodd	2019	8	55	—	1	4	7	6	9	11	7	10
27	Yasmin Meakes	2020	7	55	—	—	4	7	7	11	10	13	3
27	Hannah Southwell	2018	9	55	3	3	3	7	1	8	10	9	11
30	Brydie Parker	2018	7	54	2	—	4	7	—	10	5	13	13
30	Jesse Southwell	2022	5	54	—	—	—	—	7	11	9	13	14
32	Keilee Joseph	2021	6	53	—	—	—	6	6	10	10	13	8
32	Otesa Pule	2022	5	53	—	—	—	—	6	10	11	13	13
34	Teagan Berry	2020	7	52	—	—	1	7	6	9	9	9	11
34	Jada Ferguson	2021	6	52	—	—	—	4	5	7	10	13	13
34	Leianne Tufuga	2021	6	52	—	—	—	7	5	9	7	11	13
37	Millie Elliott	2019	7	51	—	4	4	5	7	8	10	—	13
38	Kezie Apps	2018	9	50	3	4	2	5	5	7	3	11	10
38	Shenae Ciesiolka	2020	7	50	—	—	3	6	5	10	8	8	10
40	Brianna Clark	2020	7	49	—	—	2	4	4	8	8	11	12
40	Jessika Elliston	2019	8	49	—	1	4	6	5	11	9	12	1
40	Amber Hall	2019	8	49	—	4	3	6	5	1	10	11	9
40	Nita Maynard-Perrin	2018	9	49	4	3	4	4	3	11	8	8	4
40	Jasmin Strange	2022	5	49	—	—	—	—	1	11	11	13	13
45	Brooke Anderson	2022	5	48	—	—	—	—	5	9	11	12	11
45	Abbi Church	2021	6	48	—	—	—	5	3	9	9	11	11
45	Emma Manzelmann	2021	6	48	—	—	—	5	7	9	9	12	6
45	Rachael Pearson	2021	6	48	—	—	—	6	6	6	9	11	10
45	Jasmine Peters	2021	6	48	—	—	—	5	3	9	9	12	10
45	Tayla Preston	2022	5	48	—	—	—	—	6	9	11	11	11
45	Kayla Romaniuk	2022	5	48	—	—	—	—	3	11	10	12	12
52	Jaime Chapman	2020	7	47	—	—	3	6	5	9	8	5	11
52	Jayme Fressard	2020	7	47	—	—	3	4	5	8	9	8	10
52	Sophie Holyman	2022	5	47	—	—	—	—	5	9	9	11	13
55	Elsie Albert	2020	7	46	—	—	3	7	5	1	9	10	11
55	Talei Holmes	2020	7	46	—	—	3	4	3	9	10	13	4
55	Apii Nicholls	2018	7	46	3	3	—	—	5	8	9	10	8
58	Gayle Broughton	2022	5	45	—	—	—	—	7	8	8	13	9
58	Rima Butler	2022	5	45	—	—	—	—	5	7	8	13	12
58	Sheridan Gallagher	2023	4	45	—	—	—	—	—	11	8	13	13
58	Evania Isa'ako	2023	6	45	—	—	3	5	5	11	9	—	12
58	Shannon Mato	2020	6	45	—	—	4	2	5	11	9	—	14
58	Christian Pio	2021	6	45	—	—	—	4	7	9	9	4	12
58	Chanté Temara	2020	6	45	—	—	2	—	1	9	9	11	13
58	Botille Vette-Welsh	2018	8	45	1	4	2	5	—	7	9	11	6
66	Corban Baxter	2019	6	44	—	3	4	5	—	10	—	9	13
66	Lauren Dam	2021	5	44	—	—	—	2	—	10	7	11	14
66	Annetta Nu'uausala	2018	8	44	1	3	—	5	2	7	6	11	9
69	Destiny Brill	2021	6	43	—	—	—	6	6	9	9	11	2
69	Kalosipani Hopoate	2022	5	43	—	—	—	—	6	7	11	10	9
69	Emma Verran	2021	5	43	—	—	—	7	6	9	9	12	—
72	Brittany Breayley-Nati	2018	7	42	4	4	—	6	5	11	9	3	—
72	Hayley Maddick	2021	5	42	—	—	—	5	4	10	10	13	—
72	Ashleigh Quinlan	2022	5	42	—	—	—	—	6	9	8	10	9
72	Georgia Roche	2023	4	42	—	—	—	—	—	8	10	13	11
72	Chloe Saunders	2023	4	42	—	—	—	—	—	9	9	11	13
77	Laikha Clarke	2021	6	41	—	—	—	2	5	3	9	10	12
77	Zali Fay	2022	5	41	—	—	—	—	6	9	9	9	8
77	Simone Karpani	2021	6	41	—	—	—	6	6	5	7	9	8
80	Madison Bartlett	2019	7	40	—	2	3	6	5	9	9	6	—
80	Krystal Blackwell	2023	4	40	—	—	—	—	—	7	8	12	13
80	Bree Chester	2023	4	40	—	—	—	—	—	8	9	12	11
80	Tiana Davison	2022	5	40	—	—	—	—	2	6	8	13	11
80	Stephanie Hancock	2018	7	40	4	4	3	6	5	11	7	—	—
80	Mele Hufanga	2023	4	40	—	—	—	—	—	10	10	13	7
80	Shenai Lendill	2023	4	40	—	—	—	—	—	9	9	11	11
80	Mahalia Murphy	2020	5	40	—	—	3	—	—	9	9	8	11
80	Cassie Staples	2022	5	40	—	—	—	—	1	5	11	13	10
80	Angelina Teakaraanga-Katoa	2022	5	40	—	—	—	—	1	9	9	10	11

As at the conclusion of the 2026 season, Talei Holmes has played the most games (46) without scoring a try, followed by Najvada George (36).

=== Most games played for each club ===
As of 5 October 2026 (after the Grand Finalof the 2026 season). Bold text indicates that the player is a current member of the club.

Club	Player(s)	Matches
Brisbane Broncos	**Chelsea Lenarduzzi**	69
Canberra Raiders	**Sophie Holyman** & **Chanté Temara**	42
Canterbury-Bankstown Bulldogs	**Andie Robinson** & **Tayla Preston**	22
Cronulla-Sutherland Sharks	**Ellie Johnston**	43
Gold Coast Titans	**Georgia Hale**	53
Newcastle Knights	**Shanice Parker**	53
New Zealand Warriors	**Apii Nicholls**	24
North Queensland Cowboys	**Jasmine Peters**	40
Parramatta Eels	**Abbi Church**	48
St George Illawarra Dragons	Teagan Berry	52
Sydney Roosters	**Isabelle Kelly**	66
Wests Tigers	**Sarah Togatuki**	39

=== Most points scored ===
==== In a career ====
The following players have scored 40 or more points in NRLW matches.
Table last updated 5 October 2026 (after the Grand Final of the 2026 season).

R	Player	Debut	S	M	T	G	FG	P	2018	2019	2020	2021	2022	2023	2024	2025	2026
1	Jocelyn Kelleher	2020	7	64	8	169	1	371	—	—	0	1t	2t	2t 32g	1t 37g	1t 50g 1fg	1t 50g
2	Jesse Southwell	2022	5	54	9	158	0	352	—	—	—	—	2t 6g	3t 33g	22g	2t 41g	2t 56g
3	Zahara Temara	2018	9	65	7	135	4	302	3g	0	1t 9g	10g 1fg	1t 21g	1t 21g 1fg	2t 25g	2t 21g 1fg	25g 1fg
4	Kirra Dibb	2019	8	57	8	127	2	288	—	4g	1t 4g	4g	1t 15g	1t 18g 1fg	1t 18g 1fg	2t 22g	2t 42g
5	Lauren Brown	2020	7	57	7	108	3	247	—	—	1t	19g	7g	1t 11g 2fg	3t 11g	1t 21g 1fg	1t 39g
6	Tamika Upton	2019	8	64	61	0	0	244	—	1t	5t	1t	5t	7t	7t	20t	15t
7	Rachael Pearson	2021	6	48	6	107	3	241	—	—	—	1t 12g	8g 1fg	12g	1t 22g	3t 27g	1t 26g 2fg
8	Romy Teitzel	2020	7	59	17	74	0	216	—	—	0	2t	3t	0	4t 24g	4t 50g	4t
9	Tayla Preston	2022	5	48	3	100	0	212	—	—	—	—	1t 15g	1t 25g	22g	1t 21g	17g
10	Jessica Sergis	2018	9	59	45	0	0	180	1t	3t	1t	1t	2t	7t	5t	8t	17t
11	Raecene McGregor	2018	9	60	5	78	1	177	0	1t	0	0	0	14g	19g	1t 12g	3t 33g 1fg
12	Teagan Berry	2020	7	52	40	1	0	162	—	—	1t 1g	4t	5t	11t	8t	8t	3t
13	Julia Robinson	2018	9	60	40	0	0	160	2t	1t	2t	1t	3t	5t	9t	9t	8t
14	Jayme Fressard	2020	7	47	36	0	0	144	—	—	0	1t	5t	6t	6t	5t	13t
15	Sheridan Gallagher	2023	4	45	28	14	0	140	—	—	—	—	—	7t 4g	9t 3g	9t	3t 7g
16	Ali Brigginshaw	2018	9	67	14	36	0	128	2t	1t	1t	1t	2t 3g	5t 32g	1t	0	1t 1g
17	Madison Bartlett	2019	7	40	30	0	0	120	—	1t	1t	6t	3t	7t	8t	4t	—
17	Jaime Chapman	2020	7	47	30	0	0	120	—	—	0	3t	4t	9t	3t	2t	9t
17	Isabelle Kelly	2018	9	68	30	0	0	120	2t	0	0	4t	3t	5t	3t	7t	6t
20	Mele Hufanga	2023	4	40	29	0	0	116	—	—	—	—	—	10t	7t	8t	4t
21	Brydie Parker	2018	7	54	28	0	0	112	1t	—	0	3t	—	4t	4t	2t	14t
22	Tarryn Aiken	2019	8	56	24	7	1	111	—	0	1t	2t	3t 1g	5t	3t 1fg	5t	5t 6g
23	Georgia Ravics	2023	4	35	25	0	0	100	—	—	—	—	—	5t	5t	10t	5t
24	Olivia Kernick	2021	6	60	24	0	0	96	—	—	—	3t	3t	1t	6t	7t	4t
25	Emily Bass	2021	6	35	20	6	0	92	—	—	—	4t	0	2t	6t	3t 6g	5t
26	Chelsea Lenarduzzi	2018	9	69	22	0	0	88	0	1t	2t	1t	1t	3t	4t	4t	6t
26	Patricia Maliepo	2025	2	20	7	30	0	88	—	—	—	—	—	—	—	4t 17g	3t 13g
28	Evania Isa'ako	2020	6	45	21	0	0	84	—	—	3t	1t	0	5t	4t	—	8t
28	Kerri Johnson	2025	2	26	21	0	0	84	—	—	—	—	—	—	—	10t	11t
30	Chantay Kiria-Ratu	2023	3	33	5	31	1	83	—	—	—	—	—	2t 2g	—	1t 11g 1fg	2t 18g
31	Lauren Dam	2021	5	44	20	0	0	80	—	—	—	0	—	7t	2t	4t	7t
31	Tiana Penitani Gray	2019	8	56	20	0	0	80	—	2t	1t	2t	2t	2t	9t	0	2t
33	Shenae Ciesiolka	2020	7	50	19	0	0	76	—	—	0	4t	3t	5t	5t	0	2t
34	Jasmine Peters	2021	6	48	18	0	0	72	—	—	—	4t	0	3t	4t	5t	2t
34	Payton Takimoana	2025	2	19	18	0	0	72	—	—	—	—	—	—	—	15t	3t
36	Quincy Dodd	2019	8	55	17	0	0	68	—	0	3t	1t	1t	3t	3t	2t	4t
36	Georgia Grey	2024	3	28	17	0	0	68	—	—	—	—	—	—	2t	8t	7t
36	Olivia Higgins	2021	6	59	17	0	0	68	—	—	—	1t	2t	4t	4t	3t	3t
36	Rory Owen	2024	3	24	17	0	0	68	—	—	—	—	—	—	5t	2t	10t
36	Cassie Staples	2022	5	40	17	0	0	68	—	—	—	—	0	2t	4t	8t	3t
36	Simaima Taufa	2018	9	59	17	0	0	68	0	2t	0	1t	4t	2t	4t	2t	2t
36	Emma Verran	2021	5	43	17	0	0	68	—	—	—	4t	1t	3t	0	9t	—
36	Mackenzie Wiki	2023	4	36	17	0	0	68	—	—	—	—	—	0	4t	3t	10t
44	Georgia Hannaway	2024	3	29	6	21	0	66	—	—	—	—	—	—	1t	2t 17g	3t 4g
45	Amber Hall	2019	8	49	16	0	0	64	—	1t	1t	2t	0	0	5t	4t	3t
45	Ellie Johnston	2020	7	58	16	0	0	64	—	—	0	1t	1t	6t	4t	3t	1t
45	Taina Naividi	2021	4	31	16	0	0	64	—	—	—	0	—	—	1t	11t	4t
45	Pauline Piliae-Rasabale	2023	4	25	2	28	0	64	—	—	—	—	—	15g	1t 13g	1t	0
45	Mia Wood	2023	4	31	16	0	0	64	—	—	—	—	—	4t	5t	5t	2t
50	Phoenix-Raine Hippi	2025	2	17	15	0	0	60	—	—	—	—	—	—	—	9t	6t
50	Yasmin Meakes	2020	7	55	15	0	0	60	—	—	2t	1t	2t	4t	3t	2t	1t
50	Shanice Parker	2019	7	58	15	0	0	60	—	0	0	—	0	6t	2t	3t	4t
50	Leianne Tufuga	2021	6	52	15	0	0	60	—	—	—	2t	2t	5t	1t	1t	4t
50	Stacey Waaka	2024	2	16	15	0	0	60	—	—	—	—	—	—	6t	—	9t
55	Hayley Maddick	2021	5	42	14	0	0	56	—	—	—	0	1t	2t	3t	8t	—
55	Elise Simpson	2025	2	18	14	0	0	56	—	—	—	—	—	—	—	6t	8t
55	Mercedez Taulelei-Siala	2025	2	13	14	0	0	56	—	—	—	—	—	—	—	1t	13t
55	Shakiah Tungai	2018	6	26	11	6	0	56	1t 3g	2t	0	—	0	4t 1g	4t 2g	—	—
55	Margot Vella	2023	4	26	14	0	0	56	—	—	—	—	—	5t	2t	2t	5t
55	Jakiya Whitfeld	2022	4	29	14	0	0	56	—	—	—	—	0	4t	6t	4t	—
61	Rosie Kelly	2024	3	27	3	21	0	54	—	—	—	—	—	—	1t	1t 2g	1t 19g
62	Corban Baxter	2019	6	44	13	0	0	52	—	0	2t	0	—	7t	—	1t	3t
62	Francesca Goldthorp	2023	4	39	13	0	0	52	—	—	—	—	—	1t	2t	6t	4t
64	Destiny Brill	2021	6	43	12	0	0	48	—	—	—	1t	3t	3t	2t	3t	0
64	Gayle Broughton	2022	5	45	12	0	0	48	—	—	—	—	1t	4t	2t	2t	3t
64	Brianna Clark	2020	7	49	4	16	0	48	—	—	0	7g	1g	1t	1t 2g	1t 6g	1t
64	Emma Manzelmann	2021	6	48	9	6	0	48	—	—	—	0	2t	3t	0	3t 4g	1t 2g
64	Jayme Millard	2025	2	16	7	10	0	48	—	—	—	—	—	—	—	1t 7g	6t 3g
64	Keeley Nizza	2018	9	69	12	0	0	48	0	0	0	1t	0	2t	1t	3t	5t
64	Abigail Roache	2023	4	38	12	0	0	48	—	—	—	—	—	6t	3t	3t	0
64	Georgia Roche	2023	4	42	10	4	0	48	—	—	—	—	—	1t	2t 4g	4t	3t
64	Georgia Roche	2023	4	42	10	4	0	48	—	—	—	—	—	1t	2t 4g	4t	3t
64	Monica Tagoai	2025	2	18	12	0	0	48	—	—	—	—	—	—	—	3t	9t
64	Meg Ward	2018	3	10	3	18	0	48	1t	1t 5g	1t 13g	—	—	—	—	—	—
75	Elsie Albert	2020	7	46	11	0	0	44	—	—	0	2t	1t	0	2t	3t	3t
75	Chelsea Baker	2018	2	7	2	18	0	44	2t 15g	3g	—	—	—	—	—	—	—
75	Krystal Blackwell	2023	4	40	11	0	0	44	—	—	—	—	—	1t	1t	5t	4t
75	Indie Bostock	2025	2	18	11	0	0	44	—	—	—	—	—	—	—	3t	8t
75	Abbi Church	2021	6	48	11	0	0	44	—	—	—	2t	1t	1t	1t	3t	3t
75	Mahalia Murphy	2020	5	40	11	0	0	44	—	—	0	—	—	3t	3t	3t	2t
75	Otesa Pule	2022	5	53	11	0	0	44	—	—	—	—	1t	5t	2t	1t	2t
75	Jasmin Strange	2022	5	49	11	0	0	44	—	—	—	—	1t	4t	1t	4t	1t
75	Lavinia Tauhalaliku	2024	3	11	11	0	0	44	—	—	—	—	—	—	1t	1t	9t
75	Caitlin Turnbull	2025	2	20	11	0	0	44	—	—	—	—	—	—	—	8t	3t
85	Millie Elliott	2019	7	51	10	0	0	40	—	0	1t	3t	1t	2t	0	—	3t
85	Zali Fay	2022	5	41	10	0	0	40	—	—	—	—	2t	2t	2t	0	4t
85	Rikeya Horne	2018	8	37	10	0	0	40	1t	0	0	0	3t	4t	2t	—	0
85	Kimberley Hunt	2023	2	11	10	0	0	40	—	—	—	—	—	5t	5t	—	—
85	Tysha Ikenasio	2025	2	18	10	0	0	40	—	—	—	—	—	—	—	2t	8t
85	Bobbi Law	2019	8	36	10	0	0	40	—	1t	1t	0	1t	2t	2t	0	3t
85	Simina Lokotui	2025	2	17	10	0	0	40	—	—	—	—	—	—	—	1t	9t
85	Elizabeth MacGregor	2025	2	17	10	0	0	40	—	—	—	—	—	—	—	7t	3t
85	Tayla Predebon	2021	6	56	10	0	0	40	—	—	—	0	2t	3t	1t	1t	3t
85	Tenika Willison	2024	3	31	10	0	0	40	—	—	—	—	—	—	4t	2t	4t

==== Leading point scorer ====
Player	Club when lead taken	From					To					Duration		Outright leader
Player	Club when lead taken	Season	Round	Week	Date	Points	Points	Season	Round	Week	Date	Days	Rounds	Outright leader
Hilda Peters	Warriors	2018	1	1	8 Sep 2018	4	4	2018	1	1	9 Sep 2018	1	0	Yes
Luisa Gago	Warriors	2018	1	1	8 Sep 2018	4	4	2018	1	1	9 Sep 2018	1	0	No
Isabelle Kelly	Roosters	2018	1	1	8 Sep 2018	4	4	2018	1	1	9 Sep 2018	1	0	No
Chelsea Baker	Broncos	2018	1	1	9 Sep 2018	18	44	2020	3	11	17 Oct 2020	769	10	Yes
Meg Ward	Broncos	2020	3	11	17 Oct 2020	44	48	2021	GF	19	10 Apr 2022	540	8	Yes
Zahara Temara	Roosters	2021	GF	19	10 Apr 2022	49	236	2025	9	57	30 Aug 2025	1238	38	Yes
Jocelyn Kelleher	Roosters	2025	7	55	17 Aug 2025	220	371	2026	GF	76	5 Oct 2026	414	21	Yes

Notes:
- Zahara Temara became the leading point scorer whilst playing for the Sydney Roosters prior to transferring to the Canberra Raiders in the 2023 season.
- Tallies in the **Duration — Rounds** column includes final series matches.
- As of 5 October 2026

==== For each club ====
As of 5 October 2026 (after the Grand Final). Bold text indicates that the player is a current member of the club.

Club	Player(s)	Points
Brisbane Broncos	**Romy Teitzel**	196
Canberra Raiders	**Zahara Temara**	207
Canterbury-Bankstown Bulldogs	**Tayla Preston**	80
Cronulla-Sutherland Sharks	**Georgia Ravics**	100
Gold Coast Titans	**Lauren Brown**	205
Newcastle Knights	Jesse Southwell	232
New Zealand Warriors	**Patricia Maliepo**	88
North Queensland Cowboys	Kirra Dibb	134
Parramatta Eels	**Rachael Pearson**	196
St George Illawarra Dragons	Teagan Berry	162
Sydney Roosters	**Jocelyn Kelleher**	371
Wests Tigers	**Raecene McGregor**	79

==== In each season ====
As of 5 October 2026

Season	Player	Club	M	T	G	FG	Points
2018	Chelsea Baker	Broncos	4	2	15	0	38
2019	Maddie Studdon	Dragons	4	0	8	0	16
2020	Meg Ward	Broncos	4	1	13	0	30
2021	Lauren Brown	Broncos	6	0	19	0	38
2022	Zahara Temara	Roosters	6	1	21	0	46
2023	Ali Brigginshaw	Broncos	10	5	32	0	84
2024	Jocelyn Kelleher	Roosters	11	1	37	0	78
2025	Romy Teitzel	Broncos	13	4	50	0	116
**2026**	Jesse Southwell	Broncos	14	2	56	0	120

Notes:
- The maximum number of matches including finals has increased over time from 4 in the 2018, 2019 and 2020 seasons, 7 in 2021 and 2022, and 11 in 2023 and 2024, and a potential 14 from 2025.
- In the first five seasons, 2018 to 2022, the player with the most points in each season has also been the player with the **most goals in each season**.
- Jesse Southwell (Knights) with 78 points from 3 tries and 33 goals (from 11 games) finished in second place as point-scorer for the 2023 season, and also in first place as the leading goal scorer in 2023.
- Romy Teitzel (Broncos) with 64 points from 4 tries and 24 goals (from 9 games) was the leading point-scorer for 2024 at the completion of the rounds. Jocelyn Kelleher was in second place with 62 points from 1 try and 29 goals. Kelleher was the leading goal-kicker at the competition of the rounds. Zahara Temara was in third place for the 2024 season with 58 points from 2 tries and 25 goals.
- Kelleher's tally went above Teitzel's tally in the Semi-Final, with the former kicking 4 goals and the latter unable to play due to injury. Kelleher added a further 8 points from 4 goals in the Grand Final.
- After 11 rounds of the 2025 season, Romy Teitzel on 106 points led Jocelyn Kelleher (Roosters), 94, Jesse Southwell (Knights), 78, and Tamika Upton, 72.
- After the Grand Final of the 2025 season, Romy Teitzel on 116 points finished ahead of Jocelyn Kelleher (Roosters), 105, Jesse Southwell (Knights), 80, and Tamika Upton, also 80.
- After 11 rounds of the 2026 season, Jocelyn Kelleher (Roosters) and Jesse Southwell (Broncos) were equal leaders on 98 points, followed by Kirra Dibb (Knights) on 88 points, Lauren Brown (Titans) on 82 points and Raecene McGregor on 79 points.
- After the Grand Final of the 2026 season, Jesse Southwell (Broncos) on 120 points finished ahead of Jocelyn Kelleher (Roosters), 104, and Kirra Dibb (Knights) on 92 points.

==== In a match ====
Player	Club	Points	Tries	Goals	FG	Date	Round	Opponent	Venue	Ref
Lauren Brown	Titans	**22**	1	9	0	6 Sep 2026	10	Tigers	Campbelltown Stadium	NRL
Tayla Preston	Sharks	**20**	1	8	0	17 Sep 2023	9	Eels	GIO Stadium	NRL
Rachael Pearson	Eels	**18**	1	7	0	19 Jul 2025	3	Raiders	GIO Stadium	NRL
Jocelyn Kelleher	Roosters	**18**	0	9	0	23 Aug 2026	8	Warriors	Allianz Stadium	NRL

=== Most tries scored ===
==== In a career ====
The following is a list of the top 50 try scorers in NRLW history.

R	Player	M	T	2018	2019	2020	2021	2022	2023	2024	2025	2026
1	**Tamika Upton**	64	61	—	1	5	1	5	7	7	20	15
2	**Jessica Sergis**	59	45	1	3	1	1	2	7	5	8	17
=3	**Teagan Berry**	52	40	—	—	1	4	5	11	8	8	3
=3	**Julia Robinson**	59	40	2	1	2	1	3	5	9	9	8
5	**Jayme Fressard**	47	36	—	—	0	1	5	6	6	5	13
=6	**Madison Bartlett**	40	30	—	1	1	6	3	7	8	4	—
=6	**Jaime Chapman**	47	30	—	—	0	3	4	9	3	2	9
=6	**Isabelle Kelly**	68	30	2	0	0	4	3	5	3	7	6
9	**Mele Hufanga**	40	29	—	—	—	—	—	10	7	8	4
=10	**Sheridan Gallagher**	45	28	—	—	—	—	—	7	9	9	3
=10	**Brydie Parker**	54	28	1	—	0	3	—	4	4	2	14
12	**Georgia Ravics**	35	25	—	—	—	—	—	5	5	10	5
=13	**Tarryn Aiken**	55	24	—	0	1	2	3	5	3	5	5
=13	**Olivia Kernick**	59	24	—	—	—	3	3	1	6	7	4
15	**Chelsea Lenarduzzi**	69	22	0	1	2	1	1	3	4	4	6
=16	**Evania Isa'ako**	45	21	—	—	3	1	0	5	4	—	8
=16	**Kerri Johnson**	26	21	—	—	—	—	—	—	—	10	11
=18	**Emily Bass**	35	20	—	—	—	4	0	2	6	3	5
=18	**Lauren Dam**	44	20	—	—	—	0	—	7	2	4	7
=18	**Tiana Penitani Gray**	56	20	—	2	1	2	2	2	9	0	2
21	**Shenae Ciesiolka**	50	19	—	—	0	4	3	5	5	0	2
=22	**Jasmine Peters**	48	18	—	—	—	4	0	3	4	5	2
=22	**Payton Takimoana**	19	18	—	—	—	—	—	—	—	15	3
=24	**Quincy Dodd**	55	17	—	0	3	1	1	3	3	2	4
=24	**Georgia Grey**	28	17	—	—	—	—	—	—	2	8	7
=24	**Olivia Higgins**	59	17	—	—	—	1	2	4	4	3	3
=24	**Rory Owen**	24	17	—	—	—	—	—	—	5	2	10
=24	**Cassie Staples**	40	17	—	—	—	—	0	2	4	8	3
=24	**Simaima Taufa**	59	17	0	2	0	1	4	2	4	2	2
=24	**Romy Teitzel**	59	17	—	—	0	2	3	0	4	4	4
=24	**Emma Verran**	43	17	—	—	—	4	1	3	0	9	—
=24	**Mackenzie Wiki**	36	17	—	—	—	—	—	0	4	3	10
=33	**Amber Hall**	49	16	—	1	1	2	0	0	5	4	3
=33	**Ellie Johnston**	58	16	—	—	0	1	1	6	4	3	1
=33	**Taina Naividi**	31	16	—	—	—	—	—	—	1	11	4
=33	**Mia Wood**	30	16	—	—	—	—	—	4	5	5	2
=37	**Phoenix-Raine Hippi**	17	15	—	—	—	—	—	—	—	9	6
=37	**Yasmin Meakes**	55	15	—	—	2	1	2	4	3	2	1
=37	**Shanice Parker**	58	15	—	0	0	—	0	6	2	3	4
=37	**Leianne Tufuga**	52	15	—	—	—	2	2	5	1	1	4
=37	**Stacey Waaka**	16	15	—	—	—	—	—	—	6	—	9
=42	Ali Brigginshaw	67	14	2	1	1	1	2	5	1	0	1
=42	**Hayley Maddick**	42	14	—	—	—	0	1	2	3	8	—
=42	**Elise Simpson**	18	14	—	—	—	—	—	—	—	6	8
=42	**Mercedez Taulelei-Siala**	13	14	—	—	—	—	—	—	—	1	13
=42	**Margot Vella**	26	14	—	—	—	—	—	5	2	2	5
=42	**Jakiya Whitfeld**	29	14	—	—	—	—	0	4	6	4	—
=48	Corban Baxter	44	13	—	0	2	0	—	7	—	1	3
=48	**Fran Goldthorp**	39	13	—	—	—	—	—	1	2	6	4
=50	**Destiny Brill**	43	12	—	—	—	1	3	3	2	3	0
=50	**Gayle Broughton**	45	12	—	—	—	—	1	4	2	2	3
=50	**Keeley Nizza**	69	12	0	0	0	1	0	2	1	3	5
=50	**Abigail Roache**	38	12	—	—	—	—	—	6	3	3	0
=50	**Monica Tagoai**	18	12	—	—	—	—	—	—	—	3	9

- Dash indicates the player did not play in any matches in that season
- **Bold** **text** indicates current players
- Table last updated 5 October 2026 (after completion of the 2026 season).

==== Leading try scorer ====
The title of being the NRLW's leading try-scorer has been shared or held outright (i.e. alone) by 10 players to date.

Player	Club when lead taken	From					To					Duration		Outright leader
Player	Club when lead taken	Season	Round	Week	Date	Tries	Tries	Season	Round	Week	Date	Days	Rounds	Outright leader
Hilda Peters	Warriors	2018	1	1	8 Sep 2018	1	1	2018	1	1	9 Sep 2018	1	0	Yes
Luisa Gago	Warriors	2018	1	1	8 Sep 2018	1	1	2018	1	1	9 Sep 2018	1	0	No
Isabelle Kelly	Roosters	2018	1	1	8 Sep 2018	1	1	2018	1	1	9 Sep 2018	1	0	No
Chelsea Baker	Broncos	2018	1	1	9 Sep 2018	2	2	2018	3	3	22 Sep 2018	13	2	Yes
Isabelle Kelly	Roosters	2018	1	2	14 Sep 2018	2	2	2018	3	3	22 Sep 2018	8	1	No
Taleena Simon	Roosters	2018	1	3	22 Sep 2018	4	4	2020	1	9	3 Oct 2020	742	6	Yes
Jessica Sergis	Dragons	2019	3	7	29 Sep 2019	4	5	2020	1	9	3 Oct 2020	370	2	No
Julia Robinson	Broncos	2020	1	9	3 Oct 2020	4	5	2020	GF	12	25 Oct 2020	22	3	No
Tamika Upton	Broncos	2020	1	9	3 Oct 2020	4	4	2020	2	10	10 Oct 2020	7	1	No
Jessica Sergis	Dragons	2020	2	10	10 Oct 2020	5	5	2020	GF	12	25 Oct 2020	15	2	No
Taleena Simon	Roosters	2020	3	11	17 Oct 2020	5	5	2020	GF	12	25 Oct 2020	8	1	No
Tamika Upton	Broncos	2020	3	11	17 Oct 2020	5	7	2021	GF	19	10 Apr 2022	540	8	Yes
Madison Bartlett	Dragons	2021	SF	18	3 Apr 2022	7	11	2022	GF	26	2 Oct 2022	182	8	Yes
Julia Robinson	Broncos	2022	1	20	21 Aug 2022	8	8	2022	3	22	3 Sep 2022	13	2	No
Teagan Berry	Dragons	2022	2	21	28 Aug 2022	8	8	2022	3	22	3 Sep 2022	6	1	No
Tamika Upton	Knights	2022	2	21	28 Aug 2022	8	9	2022	5	24	18 Sep 2022	21	3	No
Tamika Upton	Knights	2022	SF	25	25 Sep 2022	11	12	2023	1	27	23 Jul 2023	301	2	Yes
Madison Bartlett	Raiders	2023	1	27	23 Jul 2023	13	13	2023	2	28	29 Jul 2023	6	1	Yes
Teagan Berry	Dragons	2023	2	28	29 Jul 2023	14	32	2025	5	53	2 Aug 2025	735	25	Yes
Tamika Upton	Broncos	2025	5	53	2 Aug 2025	34	62	2026	GF	76	5 Oct 2026	429	23	Yes

Note:
- Tamika Upton took a share of the lead for the second time on 17 October 2020 whilst playing for the Brisbane Broncos and claimed the outright lead on 25 October 2020.
- Madison Bartlett levelled with Upton on 3 April 2022 (in the postponed 2021 season), before becoming outright leading try-scorer on 10 April 2022. Bartlett then transferred from the St. George Illawarra to the Gold Coast Titans for the 2022 season.
- At most, four players have shared the title. This occurred after Round 2 of the 2022 season, at which point Bartlett and Robinson were joined by Berry and Robinson on a tally of eight tries.
- Tallies in the **Duration — Rounds** column includes final series matches.
- As of 5 October 2026

==== For each club ====
As of 5 October 2026. Bold text indicates that the player is a current member of the club.

Club	Player(s)	Tries
Brisbane Broncos	**Tamika Upton**	42
Canberra Raiders	**Madison Bartlett**	19
Canterbury-Bankstown Bulldogs	**Monica Tagoai**	12
Cronulla-Sutherland Sharks	**Georgia Ravics**	25
Gold Coast Titans	**Jaime Chapman**	23
Newcastle Knights	Sheridan Gallagher	25
New Zealand Warriors	**Payton Takimoana**	18
North Queensland Cowboys	**Jasmine Peters**	14
Parramatta Eels	**Rory Owen**	17
St George Illawarra Dragons	**Teagan Berry**	40
Sydney Roosters	**Jessica Sergis**	40
Wests Tigers	**Caitlin Turnbull**	11

==== In each season ====
As of 5 October 2026

Season	Player	Club	Matches	Tries
2018	Taleena Simon	Roosters	4	4
2019	Jessica Sergis	Dragons	4	3
2020	Tamika Upton	Broncos	4	5
2021	Madison Bartlett	Dragons	6	6
2022	Teagan Berry	Dragons	6	5
2022	Jayme Fressard	Roosters	5	5
2022	Tamika Upton	Knights	5	5
2023	Teagan Berry	Dragons	9	11
2024	Sheridan Gallagher	Knights	8	9
2024	Julia Robinson	Broncos	10	9
2024	Tiana Penitani	Sharks	11	9
2025	Tamika Upton	Broncos	13	20
2026	Jessica Sergis	Roosters	13	17

Notes:
- Gallagher and Robinson with 9 tries each, were the equal leading try scorers for 2024 at the completion of the rounds. Both played in their team's respective Semi-Final, but neither scored.
- Penitani scored six tries across the nine rounds of the regular season, one try in the Semi-Final and two tries in the Grand Final.
- Two players were in equal fourth place for the 2024 season with 8 tries: Teagan Berry (Dragons) and Madison Bartlett (Raiders).
- After 11 rounds of the 2025 season, Tamika Upton (Broncos) with 18 tries led Payton Takimoana (Warriors), on 15 tries, Taina Naividi (Roosters) on 11 tries and Georgia Ravis (Sharks) on 10 tries.
- After the Grand Final of the 2025 season, Tamika Upton (Broncos) with 20 tries led Payton Takimoana (Warriors), on 15 tries, Taina Naividi (Roosters) on 11 tries and Georgia Ravis (Sharks) and Kerri Johnson (Broncos) on 10 tries.

==== In a match (try hattricks) ====
Player	Club	Tries	Times	Date	Round	Opponent	Venue	Ref
Taleena Simon	Roosters	**4**	4' 8' 10' 33'	22 Sep 2018	3	Dragons	Allianz Stadium	NRL
Mele Hufanga	Broncos	**4**	6' 27' 37' 40'	5 Aug 2023	3	Cowboys	Queensland Country Bank Stadium	NRL
Teagan Berry	Dragons	**4**	28' 42' 49' 66'	26 Aug 2023	6	Titans	Netsrata Jubilee Stadium	NRL
Mele Hufanga	Broncos	**4**	29' 34' 46' 62'	12 Aug 2024	3	Titans	Totally Workwear Stadium	NRL
Emma Verran	Sharks	**4**	12' 23' 32' 38'	12 Jul 2025	2	Raiders	GIO Stadium	NRL
Tamika Upton	Broncos	**4**	24' 44' 49' 65'	31 Aug 2025	9	Bulldogs	Totally Workwear Stadium	NRL
Jaime Chapman	Titans	**4**	7' 20' 46' 64'	11 July 2026	2	Bulldogs	Accor Stadium	NRL
Lavinia Tauhalaiku	Warriors	**4**	3' 63' 64' 69'	18 July 2026	3	Cowboys	Mount Smart Stadium	NRL
Kimiora Breayley-Nati	Broncos	**3**	5' 17' 45'	30 Sep 2018	GF	Roosters	ANZ Stadium	NRL
Tamika Upton	Broncos	**3**	16' 19' 28'	3 Oct 2020	1	Warriors	GIO Stadium	NRL
Jaime Chapman	Broncos	**3**	9' 31' 50'	3 Sep 2022	3	Titans	Moreton Daily Stadium	NRL
Leianne Tufuga	Tigers	**3**	13' 64' 68'	6 Aug 2023	3	Raiders	GIO Stadium	NRL
Jayme Fressard	Roosters	**3**	24' 29' 45'	13 Aug 2023	4	Sharks	PointsBet Stadium	NRL
Mia Wood	Roosters	**3**	18' 24' 64'	26 Aug 2023	6	Tigers	Allianz Stadium	NRL
Jaime Chapman	Titans	**3**	34' 36' 59'	10 Sep 2023	6	Eels	Cbus Super Stadium	NRL
Julia Robinson	Broncos	**3**	9' 39' 68'	16 Sep 2023	9	Dragons	Netsrata Jubilee Stadium	NRL
Jaime Chapman	Titans	**3**	13' 39' 42'	1 Oct 2023	GF	Knights	Accor Stadium	NRL
Emily Bass	Titans	**3**	4' 11' 49'	28 Jul 2024	1	Dragons	WIN Stadium	NRL
Jaime Chapman	Titans	**3**	13' 24' 37'	3 Aug 2024	2	Tigers	Cbus Super Stadium	NRL
Sheridan Gallagher	Knights	**3**	9' 30' 49'	14 Sep 2024	8	Titans	Cbus Super Stadium	NRL
Taina Naividi	Roosters	**3**	16' 28' 32'	6 Jul 2025	1	Warriors	Allianz Stadium	NRL
Caitlin Turnbull	Tigers	**3**	4' 25' 41'	20 Jul 2025	3	Titans	Leichhardt Oval	NRL
Payton Takimoana	Warriors	**3**	31' 36' 61'	20 Jul 2025	3	Knights	McDonald Jones Stadium	NRL
Tamika Upton	Broncos	**3**	9' 21' 38'	2 Aug 2025	5	Sharks	McDonald Jones Stadium	NRL
Payton Takimoana	Warriors	**3**	28' 54' 65'	16 Aug 2025	7	Raiders	FMG Stadium Waikato	NRL
Georgia Grey	Titans	3	13' 21' 39'	23 Aug 2025	8	Dragons	Cbus Super Stadium	NRL
Taina Naividi	Roosters	**3**	4' 9' 43'	23 Aug 2025	8	Eels	CommBank Stadium	NRL
Lily-Ann White	Knights	**3**	3' 15' 46'	31 Aug 2025	9	Sharks	Sharks Stadium	NRL
Georgia Ravics	Sharks	**3**	25' 61' 65'	31 Aug 2025	9	Knights	Sharks Stadium	NRL
Martha Mataele	Eels	**3**	9' 30' 67'	7 Sep 2025	10	Tigers	CommBank Stadium	NRL
Tamika Upton	Broncos	**3**	8' 26' 41'	13 Sep 2025	11	Cowboys	Totally Workwear Stadium	NRL
Keighley Simpson	Knights	**3**	44' 55' 66'	14 Sep 2025	11	Dragons	McDonald Jones Stadium	NRL
Kerri Johnson	Broncos	3	1' 18' 59'	4 July 2026	1	Cowboys	Suncorp Stadium	NRL
Tamika Upton	Broncos	**3**	9' 29' 60'	9 July 2026	2	Sharks	Sharks Stadium	NRL
Faythe Manera	Tigers	**3**	4' 32' 45'	11 July 2026	2	Cowboys	Queensland Country Bank Stadium	NRL
Simina Lokotui	Bulldogs	**3**	10' 16' 39'	18 July 2026	3	Sharks	Accor Stadium	NRL
Jayme Fressard	Roosters	**3**	3' 10' 48'	26 July 2026	4	Tigers	Leichhardt Oval	NRL
Jessica Sergis	Roosters	**3**	27' 56' 67'	1 Aug 2026	3	Dragons	Geohex Park	NRL
Tysha Ikenasio	Warriors	**3**	1' 5' 41'	8 Aug 2026	6	Knights	FMG Stadium Waikato	NRL
Brydie Parker	Roosters	**3**	18' 35' 58'	15 Aug 2026	7	Broncos	Suncorp Stadium	NRL
Krystal Blackwell	Raiders	**3**	18' 32' 44'	22 Aug 2026	8	Bulldogs	Belmore Sports Ground	NRL
Charlize Lloyd-Phillips	Cowboys	**3**	6' 32' 54'	22 Aug 2026	8	Dragons	Allianz Stadium	NRL
Brydie Parker	Roosters	**3**	27' 36' 59'	23 Aug 2026	8	Warriors	Allianz Stadium	NRL
Mackenzie Wiki	Raiders	**3**	58' 68' 70'	29 Aug 2026	9	Titans	Cbus Super Stadium	NRL
Mercedez Taulelei-Siala	Knights	**3**	11' 27' 65'	29 Aug 2026	9	Cowboys	Queensland Country Bank Stadium	NRL
Kerri Johnson	Broncos	**3**	17' 21' 53'	30 Aug 2026	9	Eels	CommBank Stadium	NRL
Tayla Predebon	Knights	**3**	10' 62' 67'	5 Sept 2026	10	Bulldogs	McDonald Jones Stadium	NRL
Jaime Chapman	Titans	**3**	10' 23' 31'	6 Sept 2026	10	Tigers	Campbelltown Sports Stadium	NRL
Brydie Parker	Roosters	**3**	4' 26' 56'	4 Oct 2026	GF	Broncos	Accor Stadium	NRL

Most try hattricks

1. Jaime Chapman 6
2. Tamika Upton 5
3. Brydie Parker 3

=== Most goals kicked ===
==== In a row ====
- 22 — Jesse Southwell in 2025

==== In a match ====
Player	Club	Goals	Times	Missed	Date	Round	Opponent	Venue	Ref
Jocelyn Kelleher	Roosters	9	7' 11' 34' 37' 46' 54' 57' 65' 68'	29' 49' 60'	23 Aug 2026	8	Warriors	Allianz Stadium	NRL
Lauren Brown	Titans	9	5' 12' 21' 24' 30' 32' 42' 64' 67'	59'	6 Sep 2026	10	Tigers	Campbelltown Stadium	NRL
Tayla Preston	Sharks	8	2' 5' 11' 31' 34' 39' 55' 70'	21' 64'	17 Sep 2023	9	Eels	GIO Stadium	NRL
Georgia Hannaway	Sharks	8	4' 13' 24' 28' 34' 41' 50' 67'	40' 54'	12 Jul 2025	2	Raiders	GIO Stadium	NRL
Zahara Temara	Raiders	8	10' 15' 24' 28' 42' 55' 57' 60'	2' 52'	23 Aug 2025	8	Bulldogs	Belmore Sports Ground	NRL
Kirra Dibb	Knights	8	7' 12' 15' 19' 54' 57' 63' 68'	32' 34'	5 Sep 2026	10	Bulldogs	McDonald Jones Stadium	NRL
Jocelyn Kelleher	Roosters	7	13' 27' 32' 44' 47' 56' 58'	22'	3 Sep 2023	7	Eels	IG Stadium	NRL
Rachael Pearson	Eels	7	6' 21' 34' 38' 46' 59' 65'	8'	19 Jul 2025	3	Raiders	GIO Stadium	NRL
Kirra Dibb	Cowboys	7	10' 19' 22' 44' 50' 55' 66'	57'	6 Sep 2025	10	Dragons	WIN Stadium	NRL
Romy Teitzel	Broncos	7	10' 13' 22' 28' 35' 43' 55'	39' 70'	13 Sep 2025	11	Cowboys	Totally Workwear Stadium	NRL
Rachael Pearson	Eels	7	6' 18' 21' 31' 37' 58' 66'	14' 56'	23 Aug 2026	8	Sharks	Ocean Protect Stadium	NRL
Jocelyn Kelleher	Roosters	7	4' 8' 16' 19' 31' 42' 58'	2' 14'	5 Sep 2026	10	Cowboys	QCB Stadium	NRL
Tayla Preston	Sharks	6	2' 16' 20' 25' 63' 67'	43'	19 Aug 2023	5	Cowboys	QCB Stadium	NRL
Raecene McGregor	Dragons	6	22' 28' 31' 33' 62' 65'	6' 54' 80'	2 Sep 2023	7	Cowboys	QCB Stadium	NRL
Jocelyn Kelleher	Roosters	6	17' 19' 35' 41' 50' 54'	59'	16 Sep 2023	9	Cowboys	Netsrata Jubilee	NRL
Romy Teitzel	Broncos	6	6' 19' 34' 40' 44' 48'	32' 64'	11 Aug 2024	3	Titans	Totally Workwear Stadium	NRL
Romy Teitzel	Broncos	6	20' 39' 42' 50' 56' 67'	64' 70'	24 Aug 2024	5	Tigers	Leichhardt Oval	NRL
Raecene McGregor	Dragons	6	5' 18' 38' 58' 63' 67'	—	5 Jul 2025	1	Raiders	GIO Stadium	NRL
Romy Teitzel	Broncos	6	7' 10' 14' 17' 45' 69'	26' 67'	13 Jul 2025	2	Titans	Cbus Stadium	NRL
Jesse Southwell	Knights	6	10' 12' 21' 29' 51' 56'	—	20 Jul 2025	3	Warriors	McDonald Jones Stadium	NRL
Romy Teitzel	Broncos	6	10' 12' 34' 57' 61' 67'	4' 17'	10 Aug 2025	6	Raiders	GIO Stadium	NRL
Apii Nicholls	Warriors	6	6' 13' 30' 32' 53' 66'	23' 41' 63'	14 Sep 2025	11	Tigers	Campbelltown Stadium	NRL
Jesse Southwell	Broncos	6	7' 23' 34' 42' 62' 66'	30'	19 Jul 2026	3	Tigers	Totally Workwear Stadium	NRL
Jocelyn Kelleher	Roosters	6	11' 18' 28' 49' 58' 64'	42' 54' 70'	26 Jul 2026	4	Tigers	Leichhardt Oval	NRL
Zahara Temara	Raiders	6	4' 12' 19' 33' 40' 45'	24' 42' 58'	22 Aug 2026	8	Bulldogs	Belmore Sports Ground	NRL
Kirra Dibb	Knights	6	15' 28' 47' 64' 66' 69'	13'	29 Aug 2026	9	Cowboys	Queensland Country Bank Stadium	NRL
Jesse Southwell	Broncos	6	1' 10' 18' 21' 23' 67'	34' 55'	30 Aug 2026	9	Eels	CommBank Stadium	NRL
Raecene McGregor	Tigers	6	18' 26' 31' 39' 54' 68'	57' 66'	30 Aug 2026	9	Bulldogs	Campbelltown Stadium	NRL
Jesse Southwell	Broncos	6	2' 7' 12' 18' 24' 44'	32'	19 Sep 2026	EF	Knights	Totally Workwear Stadium	NRL

=== Most premierships won as a player ===
Player	Current club	Clubs	Premierships & years	Ref
Tamika Upton	Brisbane Broncos	Brisbane Broncos Newcastle Knights	5 2019, 2020 2022, 2023, 2025	
Millie Elliott	Sydney Roosters	Brisbane Broncos Newcastle Knights Sydney Roosters	5 2019, 2020 2022, 2024, 2026	
Julia Robinson	Brisbane Broncos	Brisbane Broncos	4 2018, 2019, 2020, 2025	
Ali Brigginshaw	Brisbane Broncos	Brisbane Broncos	4 2018, 2019, 2020, 2025	
Chelsea Lenarduzzi	Brisbane Broncos	Brisbane Broncos	4 2018, 2019, 2020, 2025	
Tarryn Aiken	Sydney Roosters	Brisbane Broncos Sydney Roosters	4 2019, 2020, 2024, 2026	
Amber Hall	Sydney Roosters	Brisbane Broncos Sydney Roosters	4 2019, 2020, 2024, 2026	
Yasmin Meakes	Newcastle Knights	Sydney Roosters Newcastle Knights	3 2021, 2022, 2023	
Olivia Higgins	Newcastle Knights	Sydney Roosters Newcastle Knights	3 2021, 2022, 2023	
Tayla Predebon	Newcastle Knights	Sydney Roosters Newcastle Knights	3 2021, 2022, 2023	
Raecene McGregor	Wests Tigers	Brisbane Broncos Sydney Roosters	3 2019, 2020, 2021	
Isabelle Kelly	Sydney Roosters	Sydney Roosters	3 2021, 2024, 2026	
Jessica Sergis	Sydney Roosters	Sydney Roosters	3 2021, 2024, 2026	
Olivia Kernick	Sydney Roosters	Sydney Roosters	3 2021, 2024, 2026	
Jocelyn Kelleher	Sydney Roosters	Sydney Roosters	3 2021, 2024, 2026	
Brydie Parker	Sydney Roosters	Sydney Roosters	3 2021, 2024, 2026	
Jayme Fressard	Sydney Roosters	Brisbane Broncos Sydney Roosters	3 2020, 2024, 2026	
Jasmin Strange	Sydney Roosters	Newcastle Knights Sydney Roosters	3 2023, 2024, 2026	
Jesse Southwell	Brisbane Broncos	Newcastle Knights	2 2022, 2023	
Hannah Southwell	St George Illawarra Dragons	Sydney Roosters, Newcastle Knights	2 2021 2023	
Keilee Joseph	Parramatta Eels	Sydney Roosters Brisbane Broncos	2 2021, 2025	
Shanice Parker	Newcastle Knights	Newcastle Knights	2 2022, 2023	
Caitlan Johnston-Green	Cronulla Sharks	Newcastle Knights	2 2022, 2023	
Simone Karpani	Newcastle Knights	Sydney Roosters Newcastle Knights	2 2021, 2022	
Romy Teitzel	Brisbane Broncos	Newcastle Knights Brisbane Broncos	2 2022, 2025	
Shenae Ciesiolka	Brisbane Broncos	Brisbane Broncos	2 2020, 2025	
Tiana Davison	Newcastle Knights	Newcastle Knights Sydney Roosters	2 2023, 2024	

== Season tallies ==
=== Pointscoring ===
Season	Teams	Rounds	Finals	Games	Players	Tries				Goals			Field goals	Points
Season	Teams	Rounds	Finals	Games	Players	Tally	per game	Scorers	Portion of players	Tally	per game	Kickers	Field goals	Points
2018	4	3	1	7	82	41	5.86	31	37.80%	24	3.43	4	0	212
2019	4	3	1	7	82	36	5.14	29	35.37%	24	3.43	5	0	192
2020	4	3	1	7	86	42	6.00	28	32.56%	27	3.86	4	0	222
2021	6	5	3	18	133	117	6.50	65	48.87%	73	4.06	12	2	616
2022	6	5	3	18	139	130	7.22	69	49.64%	79	4.39	10	1	679
2023	10	9	3	48	246	373	7.77	143	58.13%	235	4.90	18	4	1,966
2024	10	9	3	48	239	358	7.46	139	58.16%	232	4.83	17	2	1,898
2025	12	11	5	71	299	530	7.46	181	60.54%	344	4.85	20	4	2,812
2026	12	11	4	70	291	599	8.56	178	61.17%	370	5.29	21	4	3,140

Note: Table last updated 28 September 2026 (after Finals Week 2 of the 2026 season).

=== Player retention and debutants ===
Season	Teams	Rounds	Finals	Games	Players	Retention / recruitment category						Last season	
Season	Teams	Rounds	Finals	Games	Players	Retained	Debutant	Immediate transfer	Delayed transfer	Returned to club	Returned to play	Final	Only
2018	4	3	1	7	82	0	82	0	0	0	0	0	30
2019	4	3	1	7	82	33	36	13	0	0	0	6	13
2020	4	3	1	7	86	37	36	7	0	2	4	7	10
2021	6	5	3	18	133	25	64	31	10	1	2	7	17
2022	6	5	3	18	139	75	34	18	12	0	0	10	3
2023	10	9	3	48	246	55	102	66	14	3	6	16	25
2024	10	9	3	48	239	171	50	12	2	4	0	27	8
2025	12	11	5	71	299	156	82	36	17	5	3	43	25
2026	12	11	4	70	291	195	52	32	3	8	1	0	0

Notes:

- Table last updated 28 September 2026.
- Retained – Player appeared in at least one NRLW game with the same club in the preceding season
- Debutant – Player made their NRLW debut during the season.
- Immediate transfer – Player appeared in at least one NRLW game in the preceding season with a different club.
- Delayed transfer – Player did not appear in the preceding season but had played NRLW in two or more years previously at a different club.
- Returned to club – Player returned to a club after playing with a different club in the interim.
- Returned to play – Player returned to play at the same club after missing one or more seasons.
- Last season – Player has not (yet) played in subsequent seasons.
  - Final – Player appeared in NRLW games in two or more seasons.
  - Only – Player appeared in NRLW games in just one season.
  - Numbers in this pair of columns will change if players from a previous season make their first re-appearance in the current or future seasons.
- The delayed 2021 season began without the New Zealand Warriors, who entered a four-season recess, and saw the addition of three new clubs.

=== Players used and debutants introduced by club each season ===
Season	Broncos		Dragons		Roosters		Warriors		Eels		Knights		Titans		Cowboys		Raiders		Sharks		Tigers		Bulldogs	
Season	PU	D	PU	D	PU	D	PU	D	PU	D	PU	D	PU	D	PU	D	PU	D	PU	D	PU	D	PU	D
2018	20	20	19	19	21	21	22	22	–	–	–	–	–	–	–	–	–	–	–	–	–	–	–	–
2019	19	6	20	7	22	11	21	12	–	–	–	–	–	–	–	–	–	–	–	–	–	–	–	–
2020	20	7	22	9	22	8	22	12	–	–	–	–	–	–	–	–	–	–	–	–	–	–	–	–
2021	22	9	22	10	21	10	–	–	21	10	25	14	22	11	–	–	–	–	–	–	–	–	–	–
2022	23	3	23	5	24	6	–	–	23	12	24	8	22	0	–	–	–	–	–	–	–	–	–	–
2023	23	4	27	15	25	6	–	–	27	14	22	7	23	7	26	14	24	13	23	7	26	15	–	–
2024	23	4	25	6	22	3	–	–	22	4	24	6	25	6	26	3	24	5	22	4	26	9	–	–
2025	23	4	27	7	21	2	26	17	26	7	24	6	28	9	24	2	24	4	25	5	27	7	24	12
2026	22	5	23	1	22	1	26	5	26	4	24	5	26	6	26	9	21	1	26	5	24	3	25	7

Notes:

- As of 28 September 2026
- PU – Number of players used
- D – Number of NRLW debutants

== Coaching records ==
=== Coaches' wins, losses, win percentage and draws ===
All time coaches list
Coach	First game	Most recent	G	W	D	L	PF	PA	Win%	Share %	First club	G	Second club	G
Paul Dyer	9 Sep 2018	2018	4	4	0	0	110	30	100.00%	78.57%	Broncos	4	—	
Adam Hartigan	8 Sep 2018	2018	4	1	0	3	46	58	25.00%	44.23%	Roosters	4	—	
Luisa Avaiki	8 Sep 2018	2019	6	3	0	3	62	104	50.00%	37.35%	Warriors	6	—	
Daniel Lacey	9 Sep 2018	2020	10	3	0	7	104	190	30.00%	35.37%	Dragons	10	—	
Kelvin Wright	15 Sep 2019	2022	19	12	0	7	390	261	63.16%	59.91%	Broncos	19	—	
Rick Stone	14 Sep 2019	2019	3	0	0	3	28	60	0.00%	31.82%	Roosters	3	—	
Jamie Feeney	3 Oct 2020	2021	10	5	0	5	178	180	50.00%	49.72%	Roosters	4	Titans	6
Brad Donald	3 Oct 2020	2020	3	1	0	2	48	60	33.33%	44.44%	Warriors	3	—	
Jamie Soward	27 Feb 2022	2024	31	13	0	18	573	660	41.94%	46.47%	Dragons	31	—	
John Strange	27 Feb 2022	2026	59	49	0	10	1699	772	83.05%	68.76%	Roosters	59	—	
Dean Widders	27 Feb 2022	2023	21	5	0	16	285	551	23.81%	34.09%	Eels	21	—	
Casey Bromilow	27 Feb 2022	2021	5	0	0	5	48	123	0.00%	28.07%	Knights	5	—	
Ronald Griffiths	21 Aug 2022	2026	40	24	0	16	886	755	60.00%	53.99%	Knights	18	Warriors	22
Karyn Murphy	21 Aug 2022	2026	49	27	1	21	921	865	56.12%	51.57%	Titans	49	—	
Scott Prince	22 Jul 2023	2026	46	35	0	11	1408	711	76.09%	66.45%	Broncos	46	—	
Tony Herman	23 Jul 2023	2026	44	21	0	23	835	811	47.73%	50.73%	Sharks	44	—	
Darrin Borthwick	23 Jul 2023	2026	42	18	0	24	831	928	42.86%	47.24%	Raiders	42	—	
Brett Kimmorley	23 Jul 2023	2025	29	5	0	24	344	693	17.24%	33.17%	Tigers	29	—	
Ben Jeffries	22 Jul 2023	2026	44	21	0	23	985	908	47.73%	52.03%	Cowboys	9	Knights	35
Steve Georgallis	27 Jul 2024	2026	31	14	0	17	560	732	45.16%	43.34%	Eels	31	—	
Ricky Henry	27 Jul 2024	2026	32	14	0	18	519	793	43.75%	39.56%	Cowboys	32	—	
Brayden Wiliame	4 Jul 2025	2026	22	6	1	15	336	684	29.55%	32.94%	Bulldogs	22	—	
Nathan Cross	5 Jul 2025	2026	22	5	0	17	302	506	22.73%	37.38%	Dragons	22	—	
Craig Sandercock	5 Jul 2026	2026	12	7	0	5	239	302	58.33%	44.18%	Tigers	12	—	

As of 28 September 2026 (after Finals Week 2)
Share % is the percentage of points For over the sum of points For and Against.

==== Most games coached ====
- 59 — John Strange

=== Most premierships won as a coach ===
Rank	Premierships	Coach	Clubs	Years	Ref
1	2	Kelvin Wright	Brisbane Broncos	2019, 2020	
1	2	Ronald Griffiths	Newcastle Knights	2022, 2023	
1	2	John Strange	Sydney Roosters	2021, 2024	
4	1	Paul Dyer	Brisbane Broncos	2018	
4	1	Scott Prince	Brisbane Broncos	2025	

== Attendance records ==
The National Rugby League has published attendances for most but not all NRLW matches.

NRLW matches have been scheduled and played in different game-day formats. Each format can be further categorised as to whether clubs had both their NRLW and NRL teams at the venue, and whether the NRLW teams were playing in a local venue or had travelled.

Summary of NRLW match attendances by format
Format	Category	Games	With crowd published	Raw crowd total	Adjusted crowd		Average	Highest attended match					
Format	Category	Games	With crowd published	Raw crowd total	Used	Total	Average	Crowd	Home team	Away team	Venue	Round	Date
Stand-alone	Home team at home	99	93	217,964	No	217,964	2,344	12,689	Knights	Broncos	McDonald Jones Stadium	SF	Sun 24 Sep 2023
Stand-alone	Played interstate	1	1	7,855	No	7,855	7,855	7,855	Dragons	Roosters	Moreton Daily Stadium	GF	Sun 10 Apr 2022
Double-header; 1 NRLW; 2 NRL	Same club in both games	26	22	203,841	No	203,841	9,266	19,519	Knights	Sharks	McDonald Jones Stadium	6	Sun 27 Aug 2023
Double-header; 1 NRLW; 2 NRL	Same home club	74	63	490,106	No	490,106	7,779	21,367	Broncos	Knights	Suncorp Stadium	102	Sun 28 Sep 2025
Double-header; 1 NRLW; 2 NRL	Same away club	6	5	128,306	No	128,306	25,661	46,288	Roosters	Broncos	Accor Stadium	GF	Sun 5 Oct 2025
Double-header; 1 NRLW; 2 NRL	Neither club the same	9	5	133,336	No	133,336	26,667	40,649	Knights	Titans	Accor Stadium	GF	Sun 1 Oct 2023
Double-header; 1 NRL; 2 NRLW	Same club in both games	6	4	11,109	No	11,109	2,777	3,741	Dragons	Sharks	WIN Stadium	5	Sun 25 Aug 2024
Double-header; 1 NRL; 2 NRLW	Same home club	5	4	26,009	No	26,009	6,502	9,479	Knights	Dragons	McDonald Jones Stadium	3	Sun 11 Aug 2024
Triple-header; 1 NRLW; 2 NRLW; 3 NRL	Same clubs in one NRLW game	2	0	0,000	N/A	0,000	0,000	0,000	Broncos	Eels	Suncorp Stadium	5	Sun 27 Mar 2022
Triple-header; 1 NRLW; 2 NRLW; 3 NRL	Same home club in one NRLW game	1	0	0,000	N/A	0,000	0,000	0,000	Knights	Dragons	McDonald Jones Stadium	4	Sun 20 Mar 2022
Triple-header; 1 NRLW; 2 NRLW; 3 NRL	Two different NRLW teams	3	0	0,000	N/A	0,000	0,000	0,000	Roosters	Eels	McDonald Jones Stadium	4	Sun 20 Mar 2022
Triple-header; 1 NRLW; 2 NRLW; 3 NRL	Four different NRLW teams	8	3	2,415	Yes	1,910	1,273	1,229	Broncos	Dragons	AAMI Park	4	Sat 10 Sep 2022
Double-header; Both NRLW	At least one local team in each game	8	8	12,123	Yes	8,071	2,018	2,899	Roosters	Broncos	Allianz Stadium	2	Sun 4 Aug 2024
Double-header; Both NRLW	At least one local team in one game	10	10	21,778	No	21,778	2,178	3,643	Knights	Roosters	McDonald Jones Stadium	8	Sat 9 Sep 2023
Double-header; Both NRLW	Both teams visiting	10	6	7,948	No	7,948	1,325	1,584	Knights	Cowboys	Belmore Sports Ground	2	Sun 30 Jul 2023
Triple-header; All 3 NRLW	At least one local team	4	4	17,997	No	17,997	4,499	6,093	Knights	Raiders	McDonald Jones Stadium	5	Sun 3 Aug 2025
Triple-header; All 3 NRLW	Both teams visiting	8	6	18,056	Yes	19,435	6,478	6,214	Dragons	Knights	Central Coast Stadium	5	Sun 18 Sep 2022
Triple-header; All 3 NRLW	All six teams visiting	9	3	19,348	No	19,348	6,449	7,142	Sharks	Tigers	GeoHex Stadium	5	Sat 1 Aug 2026
Quadruple-header; Two NRLW; Two PM's XIII	All 4 NRLW teams visiting	2	2	9,822	Yes	6,173	6,173	6,173	Roosters	Eels	Suncorp Stadium	SF	Sun 25 Sep 2022

Notes:

- Table last updated: 28 September 2026
- Crowds have been published for 205 of 254 NRLW matches.
- This tally excludes a few instances where the published NRLW crowd is the same number as the published NRL crowd.
- Raw crowd total is the sum of the published crowds for the format and category.
- Adjusted crowd total in an attempt to avoid counting the same crowd twice where two matches at the same venue on the same day fit into the same format and category. The higher of the two numbers is used, rather than the total.
  - Example 1: At the triple-header at AAMI Park on 10 September 2022 the published crowds were (1) 505 for NRLW Titans v Eels, (2) 1,229 for NRLW Broncos v Dragons, and (3) 20,838 for NRL Storm v Raiders. The raw crowd total is 1,734 and the adjusted crowd total is the 1,229.
  - Example 2: At the all NRLW triple-header at Central Coast Stadium on 18 September 2022 the published crowds were (1) 3,066 for Broncos v Eels, (2) 4,776 for Roosters v Titans and 6,214 for Dragons v Knights. The Roosters match is included in the At least one local team category. The other two games are both in the Both teams visiting category. The raw crowd total for these two games is 3,066 + 6,214 = 10,280. The adjusted crowd total is 6,214.
  - Example 3: At the NRLW double-header at Allianz Stadium on 4 August 2024 the published crowds were (1) 1,166 for Eels v Sharks and (2) 2,899 for Roosters v Broncos. The raw crowd total is 4,065 and the adjusted crowd total is 2,899.
- There is not necessarily an agreed game time when the crowd figure is taken for NRLW games that precede NRL or other NRLW games. Typically, when an NRLW crowd is announced at the venue, it is with around ten minutes to go in the NRLW match. At an NRLW-NRL double-header, the later in the NRLW game that attendance is taken the higher it will be, as people who have no or limited interest in the NRLW match begin to arrive ahead of the NRL match's kick-off time.
- Attendance for NRLW games that follow NRL games are estimates, as spectators departing after the NRL game are not required to scan out through turnstiles.

=== Stand-alone attendances ===
The table below reflects published attendances for stand-alone NRLW matches.

Stand-alone NRLW match attendances
Season	Games	Games in this format	With crowd published	Total	Average	Highest attended match					
Season	Games	Games in this format	With crowd published	Total	Average	Crowd	Home team	Away team	Venue	Round	Date
2018	7	0	Not applicable								
2019	7	2	2	4,811	2,406	2,518	Warriors	Dragons	Mt Smart Stadium	2	Sun 22 Sep 2019
2020	7	0	Not applicable								
2021	18	2	2	8,878	4,439	7,855	Dragons	Roosters	Moreton Daily Stadium	GF	Sun 10 Apr 2022
2022	18	2	2	13,435	6,718	11,816	Broncos	Roosters	Suncorp Stadium	2	Sat 27 Aug 2022
2023	48	13	13	39,757	3,058	12,689	Knights	Broncos	McDonald Jones Stadium	SF	Sun 24 Sep 2023
2024	48	21	15	27,730	1,849	3,921	Knights	Roosters	McDonald Jones Stadium	1	Thu 25 Jul 2024
2025	71	30	30	68,527	2,284	7,195	Warriors	Broncos	FMG Stadium Waikato	10	Sun 7 Sep 2025
2026	70	33	33	66,370	2,011	7,372	Titans	Broncos	Cbus Super Stadium	PF	Sun 27 Sep 2026

Notes:

- Game days that included reserve grade (NSWRL Women's Premiership, QRL Women's Premiership) or age division matches at the same venue before or after a single NRLW match are included in this category and table.
- For six of the 21 stand-alone matches in 2024 the attendances have not yet been published. The average given for 2024 is calculated based on the 15 games with published attendances. The actual average would be lower, but by exactly how much is not known.
- There were no stand-alone games in the 2018 and 2020 seasons.
- Table last updated: 28 September 2026

== See also ==
- List of National Rugby League records

=== Current team-specific records ===
- Brisbane Broncos Women#Club records and List of Brisbane Broncos players
- Canberra Raiders Women#Club records and Canberra Raiders Women#Players list
- List of Canterbury-Bankstown Bulldogs players#Women's team
- Cronulla-Sutherland Sharks Women#Club records and Cronulla-Sutherland Sharks Women#Players list
- Gold Coast Titans Women#Club records and Gold Coast Titans Women#Players list
- Newcastle Knights Women#Club records and List of Newcastle Knights Women's players
- New Zealand Warriors Women#Club records and List of New Zealand Warriors players#Women
- List of North Queensland Cowboys players#Women's
- Parramatta Eels Women#Club records and Parramatta Eels Women#Players list
- St. George Illawarra Dragons Women#Club records and St. George Illawarra Dragons Women#Players list
- Sydney Roosters Women#Club records and List of Sydney Roosters players#Women's
- Wests Tigers Women#Club records and List of Wests Tigers NRLW players
