= List of Wests Tigers NRLW players =

This article lists all rugby league footballers who have played first-grade for the Wests Tigers in the NRLW competition. Players are listed according to the date of their debut game for the club. Players that debuted in the same game are normally capped in order of which position they played in the game, but order is at club discretion.

== List of players ==
Statistics correct as of Finals Week 1 of the 2026 NRL Women's season.

Cap No.	Name	Nationality	Tigers Career	Debut Round	Previous club (Note: Previous club refers to any previous first-grade rugby league club and does not refer to any junior club or Rugby Union club. Debut refers to a player's debut in first-grade rugby league.)	Position	Appearances	Tries	Goals	Field goals	Points
1	Botille Vette-Welsh	(Australia)	2023–24	Rd. 1	Parramatta Eels	Fullback	16	3	0	0	12
2	Jakiya Whitfeld	(Australia)	2023	Rd. 1	Newcastle Knights	Wing	9	4	0	0	16
3	Rikeya Horne	(Australia)	2023–	Rd. 1	Parramatta Eels	Centre	19	6	0	0	24
4	Leianne Tufuga	(New Zealand)	2023–24	Rd. 1	Sydney Roosters	Centre	16	6	0	0	24
5	Josie Lenaz	(Australia)	2023	Rd. 1	debut	Wing	6	1	0	0	4
6	Pauline Piliae-Rasabale	(Samoa) (Australia)	2023–24	Rd. 1	debut	Five-eighth	18	1	28	0	60
7	Emily Curtain	(Australia)	2023	Rd. 1	Parramatta Eels	Halfback	6	0	1	0	2
8	Sarah Togatuki	(Samoa) (Australia)	2023–	Rd. 1	Sydney Roosters	Prop	39	5	0	0	20
9	Ebony Prior	(Australia)	2023–24	Rd. 1	debut	Hooker	13	2	0	0	8
10	Christian Pio	(Samoa) (Australia)	2023–	Rd. 1	Parramatta Eels	Prop	34	2	0	0	8
11	Kezie Apps	(Australia)	2023–	Rd. 1	St. George Illawarra Dragons	Second-row	31	7	0	0	28
12	Eliza Siilata	(Australia)	2023	Rd. 1	debut	Second-row	8	0	0	0	0
13	Najvada George	(Australia)	2023–24	Rd. 1	Parramatta Eels	Lock	18	0	0	0	0
14	Sophie Curtain	(Australia)	2023–24	Rd. 1	debut	Hooker	15	0	0	0	0
15	Losana Lutu	(Fiji) (Australia)	2023–	Rd. 1	Parramatta Eels	Five-eighth	25	4	3	0	22
16	Taylor Osborne	(Australia)	2023	Rd. 1	debut	Second-row	5	0	0	0	0
17	Folau Vaki	(New Zealand)	2023	Rd. 1	debut	Second-row	3	0	0	0	0
18	Jessica Kennedy	(Netherlands) (Australia)	2023–24	Rd. 3	debut	Prop	8	0	0	0	0
19	Rebecca Pollard	(Australia)	2023–25	Rd. 4	debut	Wing	17	6	0	0	24
20	Imogen Gobran	(Australia)	2023	Rd. 4	debut	Prop	4	0	0	0	0
21	Salma Nour	(Australia)	2023–	Rd. 5	debut	Hooker	28	9	0	0	36
22	Tess Staines	(Australia)	2023–24	Rd. 1	Parramatta Eels	Wing	8	1	0	0	4
23	Hope Tevaga	(Australia)	2023	Rd. 6	debut	Second-row	3	0	0	0	0
24	Brooke Talataina	(New Zealand)	2023–24, 2026–	Rd. 7	debut	Halfback	21	1	0	0	4
25	Bianca Bennetts	(Australia)	2023	Rd. 7	debut	Prop	2	0	0	0	0
26	Jae Patu	(Australia)	2023	Rd. 8	debut	Lock, Prop	2	0	0	0	0
27	Harmony Crichton	(Australia)	2024–	Rd. 1	debut	Halfback	15	1	0	0	4
28	Shaianne McGlone	(New Zealand)	2024	Rd. 1	debut	Second-row	6	0	0	0	0
29	Tara Reinke	(Australia)	2024–	Rd. 1	Canberra Raiders	Prop	27	0	0	0	0
30	Natasha Penitani	(Tonga) (Australia)	2024	Rd. 1	debut	Prop	9	0	0	0	0
31	Tiana-Lee Thorne	(Australia)	2024–25	Rd. 5	debut	Wing	4	1	0	0	4
32	Montana Clifford	(Australia)	2024–25	Rd. 5	debut	Second-row	11	0	0	0	0
33	Chelsea Savill	(Australia)	2024–25	Rd. 7	debut	Hooker	9	0	0	0	0
34	Evie McGrath	(Australia)	2024–25	Rd. 7	debut	Five-eighth	9	1	0	0	4
35	Claudia Nielsen	(Australia)	2024–25	Rd. 8	debut	Wing	3	1	0	0	4
36	Claudia Brown	(Samoa) (Australia)	2024	Rd. 8	debut	Second-row	2	0	0	0	0
37	Jetaya Faifua	(Australia)	2025–	Rd. 1	North Queensland Cowboys	Fullback	13	2	0	0	8
38	Terina Te Tamaki	(New Zealand)	2025–	Rd. 1	debut	Wing	4	0	0	0	0
39	Lily Rogan	(Australia)	2025–	Rd. 1	Sydney Roosters	Centre	22	6	0	0	24
40	Emily Bass	(Australia)	2025–	Rd. 1	Gold Coast Titans	Centre	17	8	6	0	44
41	Caitlin Turnbull	(Australia)	2025–	Rd. 1	debut	Wing	20	11	0	0	44
42	Pihuka Berryman-Duff	(Samoa) (Australia)	2025–	Rd. 1	Parramatta Eels	Hooker	11	1	0	0	4
43	Jade Fonua	(Tonga) (Australia)	2025	Rd. 1	Parramatta Eels	Lock	11	0	0	0	0
44	Jessikah Reeves	(Papua New Guinea) (Australia)	2025	Rd. 1	North Queensland Cowboys	Prop	3	0	0	0	0
45	Amelia Huakau	(New Zealand)	2025	Rd. 1	debut	interchange	11	0	0	0	0
46	Faythe Manera	(Australia)	2025–	Rd. 3	debut	Halfback	19	9	0	0	36
47	Lucyannah Luamanu-Leiataua	(Australia)	2025–	Rd. 5	debut	Second-row	4	0	0	0	0
48	Portia Bourke	(Australia)	2025–	Rd. 7	debut	Second-row	13	0	0	0	0
49	Iemaima Etuale	(New Zealand)	2025	Rd. 7	debut	Prop	5	0	0	0	0
50	Ruby Fifita	(Australia)	2025	Rd. 8	debut	Prop	1	0	0	0	0
51	Namoe Gesa		2026	Rd. 1	debut	Centre	8	2	0	0	8
52	Shenai Lendill	(Australia)	2026	Rd. 1	St. George Illawarra Dragons	Centre	11	1	0	0	4
53	Raecene McGregor	(New Zealand)	2026	Rd. 1	St. George Illawarra Dragons	Halfback	12	3	33	1	79
54	Shaniece Monschau	(New Zealand)	2026	Rd. 1	Canterbury-Bankstown Bulldogs	Prop	12	2	0	0	8
55	Shaylee Bent	(Australia)	2026	Rd. 1	Gold Coast Titans	Second-row	12	3	0	0	12
56	Holli Wheeler	(Australia)	2026	Rd. 1	Canterbury-Bankstown Bulldogs	Lock	11	0	0	0	0
57	Tyla Amiatu	(New Zealand)	2026	Rd. 5	Parramatta Eels	Prop	2	0	0	0	0
58	Kayla Henderson	(Australia)	2026	Rd. 7	debut	Wing	4	0	0	0	0
59	Leah Ollerton	(Australia)	2026	Rd. 7	debut	Hooker	1	0	0	0	0
