= Gaelyn Gordon =

New Zealand writer (1939–1997)

- Born: Gaelyn Hughes; 26 November 1939; Hāwera, New Zealand
- Died: 17 May 1997 (aged 57); Auckland, New Zealand
- Occupations: Children's writer; novelist; schoolteacher
- Spouse: Peter Gordon
- Children: 2

Gaelyn Gordon (née Hughes; 26 November 1939 – 17 May 1997) was a New Zealand novelist, children's writer and schoolteacher. In a ten-year period between retiring as a teacher and her early death, she wrote a number of fantasy novels for young adults, picture books for young children, and crime novels for adults. After her death, the Gaelyn Gordon Award was established in her memory.

== Early life and teaching career ==
Gordon was born in Hāwera, in the Taranaki region of New Zealand, on 26 November 1939. She attended New Plymouth Girls' High School, followed by the University of Canterbury and Christchurch Teachers' College. She was an English and drama teacher at Hamilton Girls' High School until 1987, when she began to suffer from Ménière's disease; she left teaching at this time and became a full-time writer.

== Literary career ==
Gordon is best known for her young adult fiction, which include Stonelight (1988), Mindfire (1991) and Riversong (1995), a trilogy of fantasy novels for young adults which feature elements of Māori mythology, and two novels featuring aliens living in the head of a young man named Alfred Brown. Her 1992 novel Tripswitch, about three cousins who discover they are witches, was selected in 2004 to be the first book published as part of the Collins Modern New Zealand Classics series, along with a foreword from Tessa Duder.

She wrote a number of picture books for young children, including The Life-size Inflatable Whale, illustrated by John Tarlton. This book was published in 1998 after Gordon's death, and received the Children's Choice award at the 1999 New Zealand Post Book Awards for Children and Young Adults. Gordon's husband accepted the award on her behalf.

Gordon's novels for adults included the blackly comic crime novels Above Suspicion (1990), narrated by a murder victim, Strained Relations (1991) and Deadlines (1996). These novels feature the fictional detective Sergeant Rangi, described by the Oxford Companion to New Zealand Literature as a "comic mixture" of Hercule Poirot, Don Juan and Billy T. James. She also wrote the novel Marj's Story, one of four tie-in novels based on the New Zealand soap opera Shortland Street.

== Awards and legacy ==
Gordon received the Choysa Bursary for Children's Writers in 1990, the Buddle Findlay Sargeson Fellowship in 1992, and a Queen Elizabeth II Arts Council Scholarship in Letters in 1994. Her publisher Paul Bradwell said on her death that she was "seen by many as the best author never to win the Children's Book of the Year award, although shortlisted three years in succession". Tessa Duder said of Gordon:

In the 10 years she was a writer her output was phenomenal, of a greater variety than any other writer in New Zealand and of a broader range — I don't know of anyone else who's written right through from picture book to adult novel.

Gordon died of cancer in Auckland on 17 May 1997. She was survived by her husband and two children. In May 1998, her debut (and only) play, Within a Magic Prison, was performed at the Little Maidment Theatre in Auckland. A review in The Sunday Star-Times noted it was inspired by Gordon's experiences parenting her autistic daughter, and said "the resulting salute, flaws accepted, stands as a fond tribute to Gordon's life".

In 1999, the Children's Literature Foundation established the Gaelyn Gordon Award, presented annually in New Zealand to a children's book that has not previously won a major award but that has been popular with children and has "stood the test of time". The first winner of the award was Elsie Locke in 1999, for The Runaway Settlers.

== Selected works ==
=== Books for young adults ===
- Stonelight (1988)
- Tales from Another Now (1989)
- Several Things are Alive and Well and Living in Alfred Brown's Head (1990)
- Mindfire (1991)
- Prudence M. Muggeridge, Damp Rat (1991)
- Tripswitch (1992)
- Take Me to Your Leaders (1993)
- Riversong (1995)
- The Other Worlds of Andrew Griffin (1995)

=== Picture books ===
- Duckat (illustrated by Chris Gaskin, 1991)
- The Fortunate Flats (illustrated by John Tarlton, 1995)
- The Life-size Inflatable Whale (illustrated by John Tarlton, 1998)

=== Books for adults ===
- Above Suspicion (1990)
- Strained Relations (1991)
- Last Summer (1993)
- Fortune's Fool (1994)
- Deadlines (1996)
- Marj's Story (1996)
