= Gaelyn Gordon Award =

NZ literary award for children's fiction

The Gaelyn Gordon Award is awarded annually by the Children's Literature Foundation (now called the Storylines Children's Literature Foundation) to a well-loved work of New Zealand children's fiction.

== History ==
This award is named after Gaelyn Gordon (1939-1997) who was born in Hāwera and taught English and Drama at Hamilton Girls' High School. She published her first children's book in 1989 and wrote many more books for both children and adults until her death from cancer in 1997. Her books were popular but won no major awards during her lifetime.

The Gaelyn Gordon Award for a Much-Loved Book was established by the Children's Literature Foundation in 1998 to honour her memory and mark her contribution to New Zealand children's literature. It was set up with the help of her three publishers HarperCollins, Scholastic and David Ling Publishing. In 2005, the Children's Literature Foundation was renamed the Storylines Children's Literature Foundation, and the award is now known as the Storylines Gaelyn Gordon Award.

== Eligibility ==
- The Gaelyn Gordon Award is for a work of fiction which has stood the test of time. It is awarded to a children's book which may not have received initial recognition but has remained in print (or been reprinted) and has proven to be popular and successful over a period of years.
- The award is made annually and the winning title is chosen by a panel appointed by Storylines.
- The author must still be alive.
- The book must still be in print and have been in print for at least five years (or else reissued and in print for at least two years).
- The book may have been shortlisted for a New Zealand award, but it must not have previously won a major New Zealand award (although it may have won an award overseas).

== List of recipients ==
1999	The Runaway Settlers by Elsie Locke
2000	Grandpa's Slippers by Joy Watson, illustrated by Wendy Hodder
2001	Who Sank the Boat? by Pamela Allen
2002	See Ya, Simon by David Hill
2003	The Little Yellow Digger by Betty Gilderdale and Alan Gilderdale
2004	Under the Mountain by Maurice Gee
2005	Night Race to Kawau by Tessa Duder
2006	The Nickle Nackle Tree by Lynley Dodd
2007	Slide the Corner by Fleur Beale
2008	My Brown Bear Barney by Dorothy Butler, illustrated by Elizabeth Fuller
2009	I Am Not Esther by Fleur Beale
2010	The Wednesday Wizard by Sherryl Jordan
2011	Tangaroa's Gift by Mere Whaanga-Schollum
2012	Uncle Trev by Jack Lasenby
2013	How Maui Slowed the Sun by Peter Gossage
2014	Grandma McGarvey by Jenny Hessell, illustrated by Trevor Pye
2015	Little Kiwi is Scared of the Dark by Bob Darroch
2016	Cry of the Taniwha by Des Hunt
2017	Mr McGee by Pamela Allen
2018	Nicketty Nacketty Noo-Noo-Noo, by Joy Cowley, illustrated by Trace Moroney
2019	The Christmas caravan by Jennifer Beck, illustrated by Robyn Belton
2020	The Big Block of Chocolate by Janet Slater, illustrated by Christine Dale
2021	The Girls in the Kapa Haka by Angie Belcher, illustrated by Debbie Tipuna
2022	Winter of Fire, by Sherryl Jordan
2023	A Kiwi Night Before Christmas by Yvonne Morgan, illustrated by Deborah Hinde

== See also ==
- List of New Zealand literary awards
