= Sherryl Jordan =

New Zealand writer (1949–2023)

Sherryl Rose Jordan (née Brogden; 8 June 1949 – 15 December 2023) was a New Zealand writer for children and young adults, specialising in fantasy and historical fiction. She wrote a number of children's and young adult works, published in New Zealand and overseas. She is best known for her books The Juniper Game and The Raging Quiet. In 2001, she received the Margaret Mahy Medal for her contribution to children's literature, publishing and literacy.

== Biography ==
Jordan was born Sherryl Rose Brogden on 8 June 1949 in Hāwera, the daughter of Alan Vivian Brogden and Patricia Ita Brogden (née Cornwall). and spent her early years in Normanby, in South Taranaki. After the family shifted to Tauranga, she was educated at Tauranga Girls' College from 1962 to 1964, and then trained as a nurse from 1967 to 1968.

Jordan's early work in children's literature was as an illustrator, and she wrote picture books, middle-grade fiction, and young adult fiction. Her knowledge of sign language and her experience working as a teacher aide with deaf children is a clear influence on her historical fiction, The Raging Quiet.

Jordan died on 15 December 2023.

== Bibliography ==
Jordan's books have been published by a range of publishers internationally.

- 1981 The Silent One (Illustrations – text by Joy Cowley)
- 1983 Mouse (Illustrations)
- 1985 Mouse Monster (Illustrations)
- 1984 The Firewind and the Song
- 1985 Matthew's Monster
- 1986 Matthew's Monsters
- 1988 No Problem Pomperoy!
- 1989 Kittens
- 1989 The Wobbly Tooth
- 1990 Rocco (published in the USA as A Time of Darkness)
- 1990 Babysitter Bear
- 1991 The Juniper Game
- 1991 The Wednesday Wizard (Denzil series, book one)
- 1992 Denzil's Dilemma (Denzil series, book two) (published in the US as Wizard for a Day)
- 1993 The Other side of Midnight
- 1993 Winter of Fire
- 1994 Tanith
- 1994 Wolf-Woman
- 1995 Sign of the Lion
- 1996 Secret Sacrament
- 1997 Denzil's Great Bear Burglary (Denzil series, book three)
- 1999 The Raging Quiet
- 2002 The Hunting of the Last Dragon
- 2007 The Silver Dragon (Denzil series, book four)
- 2007 Time of the Eagle
- 2010 Finnigan and the Pirates
- 2012 Ransomwood
- 2013 The Freedom Merchants
- 2018 The Raging Quiet
- 2018 Ratbag
- 2018 The Anger of Angels
- 2021 The King's Nightingale

== Awards ==
Jordan won a number of awards, and her books were shortlisted for awards in New Zealand, the United Kingdom, the United States, Belgium and Germany.

- 1981 Whitcoulls national illustrating competition for The Silent One
- 1982 AIM Children's Book Awards Book of the Year for The Silent One
- 1988 Choysa Bursary Award for Rocco
- 1991 AIM Children's Book Awards Fiction Winner for Rocco
- 1992 Esther Glen Awards shortlist for The Juniper Game
- 1992 Esther Glen Awards shortlist for The Wednesday Wizard
- 1992 AIM Children's Book Awards Fiction shortlist for The Wednesday Wizard
- 1992 AIM Children's Book Awards Fiction shortlist for The Juniper Game
- 1993 AIM Children's Book Awards Junior Fiction shortlist for Denzil's Dilemma
- 1993 Iowa University (USA): Won a writing residency for the International Writing Programme
- 1993 American bookseller magazine "Pick of the List" for Winter of Fire
- 1994 AIM Children's Book Awards Senior Fiction shortlist for Winter of Fire
- 1994 American Library Association Best Book for Young Adults for Winter of Fire
- 1994 Children's Book of the Year by Bank Street School of Education (USA) for Winter of Fire
- 1995 AIM Children's Book Awards Senior Fiction shortlist for Tanith
- 1995 Esther Glen Awards shortlist for Tanith
- 1995 American Library Association Best Book for Young Adults for Tanith (Wolf-Woman)
- 1995 Voted one of the "Young Adults" choices (USA) for Winter of Fire
- 1999 The USA School Library Journal Best of Award for The Raging Quiet
- 2000 Storylines Notable Books List Senior Fiction list for The Raging Quiet
- 2001 Storylines Margaret Mahy Award
- 2001 Wirral Paperpack of the Year for The Raging Quiet
- 2001 Buxtehude Bulle Prize for Best Young Person's Book of the Year for The Juniper Game
- 2002 IBBY Honour Book Writing for The Raging Quiet
- 2005 Storylines Notable Books List – Young Adult Fiction list for The Hunting of the Last Dragon
- 2008 Esther Glen Awards shortlist for Time of the Eagle
- 2008 Storylines Notable Books List Young Adult Fiction list for Time of the Eagle
- 2010 Storylines Gaelyn Gordon Award for Denzil's Dilemma
- 2011 Storylines Notable Books List Junior Fiction list for Finnigan and the Pirates
- 2011 New Zealand Post Children's Book Awards Junior Fiction winner for Finnigan and the Pirates
- 2021 New Zealand Post Children's Book Awards Young Adult Fiction shortlist for The King's Nightingale
