= Joy Watson =

New Zealand writer (1938–2021)

- Born: Valerie Joy Watson; 21 February 1938; Gisborne, New Zealand
- Died: 4 October 2021 (aged 83); Havelock North, New Zealand
- Education: St Mary's College
- Occupations: Author, school dental nurse
- Writing career
- Language: English
- Period: 1980s–2021
- Genre: Children's literature
- Notable work: Grandpa's Slippers
- Notable awards: Gaelyn Gordon Award; New Zealand Post Award

Valerie Joy Watson (née Evans; 21 February 1938 – 4 October 2021) was a New Zealand author of children's books, many of which were published by Scholastic Corporation. Many of Watson's tales were based on her husband Kevin. Watson had also written lyrics to school musicals and songs. She was the mother of writer/singer/musician Mary-anne Scott.

== Early life ==
Watson was born in Gisborne on 21 February 1938 to a farming family, she was the second (and only girl) of four children. Largely educated by correspondence, she later attended school at Waipukurau and St Mary's College, Wellington. Although her father left school at a young age, both of her parents were literate. After finishing school, she trained as a dental nurse and worked in the Dannevirke area.

== Career ==
Watson began her writing career by penning stories and poems for her family. The inspiration for her book Grandpa's Slippers was her husband's old slippers. It became well-known and won a Gaelyn Gordon Award for a Much–Loved book in 2000. Grandpa's Slippers was followed by Grandpa's Cardigan, Grandpa's Shorts, Grandpa's Shed and Grandpa's Cat.

In 2015, Grandpa's Slippers was a fiction nomination for the Great Kiwi Classic, adapted into a stage show, and included in the Devonport-Takapuna Local Grants for 2017/2018. It has been published in foreign language editions.

Watson wrote 15 books and with her husband a musical performed in schools.

In 2012, Watson dedicated preschool story time to the community of Hastings for New Zealand Book Month.

== Personal life ==
Watson married pharmacist Kevin Watson and they had nine children. Her daughter Mary-anne Scott is a writer of young adult fiction.

Watson died in Havelock North on 4 October 2021, aged 83. Her Requiem Mass was held in the town on 7 October 2021.

== Works ==
- Pets (1988)
- Mouse In The House (1989)
- Grandpa's Slippers (1989)
- Grandpa's Cardigan (1993)
- No Porridge, Please (1994)
- Just In Case (1996)
- A Wet Day At School (1996)
- Foster Dog (1999)
- Highway Robbery (2000)
- The Birthday Flood (2001)
- Grandpa's Shorts (2001) - Children's Choice Award at the 2002 New Zealand Post Book Awards for Children and Young Adults
- Grandpa's Shed (2003)
- Zita the Zebra (2006)
- Grandpa's Cat (2006)
- Worms Squirm...and Other Poems (2007)
