= Winter of Fire =

Book by Sherryl Jordan

- Author: Sherryl Jordan
- Language: English
- Genre: Fantasy
- Publisher: Scholastic
- Publication date: 1992
- Publication place: US
- Media type: Print (Hardcover)
- Pages: 321
- ISBN: 0-590-45288-6
- OCLC: 25247228
- LC Class: PZ7.J7684 Wi 1992

Winter of Fire is a young adult fantasy novel by New Zealand author Sherryl Jordan, set in a bleak future environment. It was first published in 1992.

== Plot summary ==
Elsha is a teenager living in a bleak, cold future where world-wide cloud cover has permanently blocked out the sun. Humans have split into two classes - the Chosen and the Quelled, of which Elsha is the latter. The Quelled are doomed to spend their lives in servitude to the Chosen, mining "firestones" - the only means of warmth on the planet. The Firelord is the leader of the Chosen, said to be a great and powerful man.

A rebellious girl, Elsha causes trouble for herself - even going so far as being considered for execution - until she is met by a Chosen man named Amasai, Steward of the Firelord, and given the highest position available to a woman - Handmaiden to the Firelord. The Firelord's life is not known to the Chosen, but he actually made better lives for many Quelled when he was younger. He became Firelord when he was old so he could call upon a young Handmaiden to continue his previous work. On her journeys with the Firelord, Elsha meets Teraj, later revealed to be the Firelord's son, with whom Elsha forms a romantic relationship. Elsha uses her unlikely position to fight the stigma and oppression of her people, eventually inheriting the title for herself after the Firelord's unexpected death and changing the course of the planet's history for the better.

Republished by Scholastic New Zealand Ltd July 2019. ISBN 978-1-77543-598-3

== Reception ==
A review by Kirkus Reviews wrote "The emotion is affecting here, but relationships are confused rather than complex; loose ends dangle from the long, predictable story, and Elsha is unchanged by her experiences." It has also been reviewed by Publishers Weekly, New and Notable: Books For The Secondary School Library, Locus, The ALAN Review, and The Evening Post.

It is a Bank Street College of Education Best Book, and an American Library Association Best Book for Young Adults.
