= Hamilton Girls' High School =

New Zealand girls' high school

- Māori: Te Kura Tamaahine o Kirikiriroa

Location
- Ward Street; Hamilton Central; Hamilton 3204; New Zealand; 37.7896°S 175.2770°E

Information
- Type: State single-sex girls, Secondary (Year 9–13) with Boarding Facilities
- Motto: Sapiens Fortunam Fingit Sibi "A wise woman shapes her own destiny"
- Established: 1911
- Ministry of Education Institution no.: 132
- Principal: Marie Gordon
- Enrolment: 1,801 (July 2026)
- Socio-economic decile: 6N
- Website: hghs.school.nz

Hamilton Girls' High School (Māori: Te Kura Tamaahine o Kirikiriroa) is a state single sex secondary school located in central Hamilton, New Zealand. The school caters for students in Years 9 to 13 (ages 13 to 18).

== History ==
Hamilton High School was opened to students on 12 July 1911, on the current site of Hamilton Girls' High School. The first Principal was Eben Wilson and he was followed by Mr H D Tait in 1937.

In 1955, Hamilton High school was divided into separate boys' and girls' schools, and Hamilton Girls' High School retained the original site with Joan Ellis being the first principal. She was followed by Lesley Anderson in 1958, Pat Edbrooke in 1969, Lyn Scott in 1982, Judith Miles in 1988, Lil Garland in 1998 and Mary Ann Baxter 2004. The current principal is Marie Gordon, who started in 2013.

The buildings have changed significantly over the years – all that remains of the original school is the front steps to the original building, and these now lead to the Wharenui and Wharekai and Maori Language area.

The school has a boarding hostel, Sonninghill, which caters for 130 girls.

The Hamilton High and Girls' High School Old Girls' Association supports Hamilton Girls' High School and has three functions a year which any past pupil can attend.

== Enrolment ==
As of July 2026, Hamilton Girls' High School has a roll of 1,801 students, of which 580 (32.2%) identify as Māori.

As of 2026, the school has an Equity Index of 463, placing it amongst schools whose students have average socioeconomic barriers to achievement (roughly equivalent to deciles 5 and 6 under the former socio-economic decile system).

== Notable alumnae ==
- Jenny Morris (born 1956), musician
- Katherine O'Regan (born 1946), MP for Waipa
- Dame Patsy Reddy (born 1954), lawyer and Governor-General
- Terina Te Tamaki (born 1997), rugby union player and Olympic silver medallist

== See also ==
- List of schools in New Zealand
