= Jetaya Faifua =

Samoa international rugby league player (born 2003)

Personal information
- Born: 31 May 2003 (age 23) Gold Coast, Queensland, Australia
- Height: 162 cm (5 ft 4 in)
- Weight: 58 kg (9 st 2 lb)

Playing information
- Position: Fullback, Hooker, Five-eighth
Club
Years	Team	Pld	T	G	FG	P
2021–22	Gold Coast Titans	7	1	0	0	4
2023–24	Nth Qld Cowboys	11	3	0	0	12
2025–	Wests Tigers	13	2	0	0	8
	Total	31	6	0	0	24
Representative
Years	Team	Pld	T	G	FG	P
2024–	Samoa	5	1	0	0	4
- Source: As of 2 November 2026

Jetaya Faifua (born 31 May 2003) is an Australian professional rugby league footballer who currently plays for the Wests Tigers in the NRL Women's Premiership.

A wing or fullback, she previously played for the Gold Coast Titans and North Queensland Cowboys.

== Background ==
Faifua was born on the Gold Coast, Queensland is of Samoan descent. She attended Helensvale State High School and later Keebra Park State High School, where she played for their rugby sevens team.

== Playing career ==
=== Early years ===
In 2021, Faifua switched to rugby league and played for the Burleigh Bears in the QRL Women's under-19 competition and the QRL Women's Premiership. In June 2021, she represented the Queensland under-19 side. In August 2021, she signed with the Gold Coast Titans.

=== 2022 ===
In Round 1 of the delayed 2021 NRL Women's season, Faifua made her NRLW debut for the Titans in their inaugural game against the St George Illawarra Dragons. After the NRLW season ended, she played for the Tweed Seagulls in the QRL Women's Premiership. In June 2022, she represented Queensland under-19 for the second time.

Faifua returned to the Titans for the 2022 NRL Women's season, playing three games and scoring a try in Round 5 against the Sydney Roosters.

=== 2023 ===
On 10 May, Faifua signed with the North Queensland Cowboys.

In Round 2 of the 2023 NRL Women's season, Faifua made her debut for the Cowboys, starting on the wing and scoring a try in a 31–20 win over the Newcastle Knights.

=== 2024 ===
In Round 4 of the 2024 NRL Women's season, Faifua made her season debut, coming off the bench in the Cowboys' 11–10 win over the Titans.

On 10 November, Faifua played fullback for Samoa, scoring a try in their 34-12 win against Papua New Guinea.

=== 2025 ===
On 14 March, Faifua signed with the Wests Tigers.
