= Terina Te Tamaki =

NZ rugby sevens & league player (born 1997)

- Born: 1 May 1997 (age 29) New Zealand
- Height: 1.65 m (5 ft 5 in)
- Weight: 69 kg (10 st 12 lb)

Rugby union career
- Position: Hooker
National sevens team
Years	Team	Comps
2016–24	New Zealand 7s	59 (25)
- Rugby league career

Playing information
- Position: Centre
Club
Years	Team	Pld	T	G	FG	P
2025–	Wests Tigers	4	0	0	0	0
- As of 29 September 2025
Medal record
Women's rugby sevens
Representing New Zealand
Olympic Games
Silver medal – second place	2016 Rio de Janeiro	Team competition

Terina Lily Te Tamaki (born 1 May 1997) is a New Zealand rugby union and rugby league player who currently plays at centre for Wests Tigers in the NRLW.

== Family and private life ==
Te Tamaki was born in 1997. Sevens player Isaac Te Tamaki is her elder brother. Teresa Te Tamaki is her cousin. Of Māori descent, Te Tamaki affiliates to the Te Arawa, Waikato and Ngāti Maniapoto iwi. She received her education at Hamilton Girls' High School.

== Rugby career ==
Te Tamaki used to watch her elder brother play rugby for Hamilton Boys' High School and thought the sport was not for her, as it was too scary and had too much contact. But the Girls' High coach, former Black Fern Crystal Kaua, convinced her to start the sport. It became her dream to make it to the 2020 Summer Olympics in Tokyo.

Te Tamaki was contracted to the New Zealand women's sevens team in January 2016 and made her debut at the USA Women's Sevens. She was selected for New Zealand's women's sevens team to the 2016 Summer Olympics. She won a silver medal with the team and broke a New Zealand record held since the 1952 Summer Olympics by becoming the country's youngest female medallist. However, she only held the honour for 18 months until the record broken again by 16-year-old Zoi Sadowski-Synnott at the 2018 Winter Olympics.

Te Tamaki was named as a travelling reserve for the Black Ferns Sevens squad to the 2022 Commonwealth Games in Birmingham.

=== Wests Tigers ===
On 2 June 2025 it was reported that she had joined Wests Tigers for the 2025 season.
