= Wests Tigers Women =

Australian rugby league football club

Club information
- Full name: Wests Tigers Rugby League Football Club
- Nickname(s): The Tigers, Wests
- Colours: Black; White; Gold
- Founded: 27 July 1999 Club; 15 June 2022 NRLW license 23 July 2023 First NRLW game
- Website: weststigers.com.au

Current details
- Grounds: Western Sydney Stadium (30,000); Leichhardt Oval (20,000); Campbelltown Stadium (18,000)
- CEO: Shane Richardson
- Chairman: Interim Chair: Barry O'Farrell. Holman Barnes Nominee: David Gilbert.
- Coach: Craig Sandercock (from November 2025)
- Captain: Kezie Apps
- Competition: NRL Women's Premiership

Uniforms
Home colours	Away colours

Records
- Biggest win: Tigers 44 – 14 Bulldogs; Campbelltown Stadium (30 Aug 2026)
- Biggest loss: Tigers 0 – 58 Titans; Campbelltown Stadium (6 Sep 2026)
- First game: Tigers 36 – 8 Eels; CommBank Stadium (23 Jul 2023)
- Wooden spoons: 2 (2024 season 2025 season)
- Most capped: 39 – Sarah Togatuki
- Highest try scorer: 11 – Caitlin Turnbull
- Highest points scorer: 79 – Raecene McGregor

The Wests Tigers Women are an Australian professional rugby league football team, based in the Inner West and South West Sydney. The team is part of the Wests Tigers club and plays in the National Rugby League Women's Premiership.

In June 2022, Wests Tigers were accepted into the NRLW for the 2023 season. Brett Kimmorley was announced as head coach in October 2022. In early April 2023 the club made their first player signing announcement, with the naming of Kezie Apps, Botille Vette-Welsh, and Sarah Togatuki. Wests Tigers Women played their first NRLW competition game in July 2023.

== Seasons ==
Season	Regular season								Finals		Ref
Season	P	W	D	L	F	A	Pts	Pos	Top	Placing	Ref
2023	9	2	0	7	136	186	4	8th	4	—	
2024	9	2	0	7	108	218	4	10th	4	—	
2025	11	1	0	10	100	289	2	12th	6	—	
2026	11	7	0	4	239	296	14	4th	6	Elimination finalist	

=== 2026 draw ===
The draw for the 2026 season was announced on 14 November 2025.

Round	Opponent	Score	Date	Time	Venue	
1	Eels	28–16	Sun 5 Jul 2026	11:50 AM	Away	CommBank Stadium
2	Cowboys	30–18	Sat 11 Jul 2026	12:45 PM	Away	Queensland Country Bank Stadium
3	Broncos	12–40	Sun 19 Jul 2026	1:45 PM	Away	Totally Workwear Stadium
4	Roosters	10–48	Sun 26 Jul 2026	6:15 PM	Home	Leichhardt Oval
5	Sharks	32–20	Sat 1 Aug 2026	12:00 PM	Neutral	Geohex Stadium, Wagga Wagga
6	Dragons	16–12	Sun 9 Aug 2026	1:35 PM	Away	Jubilee Stadium
7	Warriors	30–22	Sun 16 Aug 2026	1:45 PM	Home	CommBank Stadium
8	Knights	27–26	Sat 22 Aug 2026	12:45 PM	Away	McDonald Jones Stadium
9	Bulldogs	44–14	Sun 30 Aug 2026	6:15 PM	Home	Campbelltown Stadium
10	Titans	0–58	Sun 6 Sep 2026	1:45 PM	Home	Campbelltown Stadium
11	Raiders	10–22	Fri 11 Sep 2026	5:40 PM	Home	Leichhardt Oval
FW1	Raiders	0–6	Fri 18 Sep 2026	7:50 PM	Home	Campbelltown Stadium

== Head-to-head records ==
Opponent	First meeting	P	W	D	L	PF	PA	Win %	Share
Eels	23 Jul 2023	4	2	0	2	78	74	50.00%	51.32%
Sharks	30 Jul 2023	4	3	0	1	70	50	75.00%	58.33%
Raiders	6 Aug 2023	5	0	0	5	60	105	0.00%	36.36%
Cowboys	12 Aug 2023	4	1	0	3	72	88	25.00%	45.00%
Dragons	19 Aug 2023	4	3	0	1	64	58	75.00%	52.46%
Roosters	26 Aug 2023	4	0	0	4	28	150	0.00%	15.73%
Titans	3 Sep 2023	4	0	0	4	28	126	0.00%	18.18%
Broncos	9 Sep 2023	4	0	0	4	48	134	0.00%	26.37%
Knights	14 Sep 2023	4	1	0	3	47	118	25.00%	28.48%
Bulldogs	10 Jul 2025	2	1	0	1	52	26	50.00%	66.67%
Warriors	14 Sep 2025	2	1	0	1	36	66	50.00%	35.29%
Totals	23 Jul 2023	41	12	0	29	583	995	29.27%	36.95%

Notes

- Share % is the percentage of points For over the sum of points For and Against.
- Clubs listed in the order that the Tigers Women first played them.
- As of 19 September 2026

== Coaches ==
Appointed in October 2022, Brett Kimmorley served as head coach for the Wests Tigers' first three NRLW seasons. Prior to the penultimate Round of the 2025 season, he announced that he would not seek reappointment. After an open call for applicants to the role, the Wests Tigers announced on 22 September 2025 that Craig Sandercock had been appointed on a two-year contract, commencing in November 2025.

Coach	Season span	M	W	D	L	For	Agst	Win %	Share %
Brett Kimmorley	2023–2025	29	5	0	24	344	693	17.24%	33.17%
Craig Sandercock	2026–present	12	7	0	5	239	302	58.33%	44.18%

As of 19 September 2026

== Captains ==
All players who have captained the Wests Tigers Women's NRLW team.
As of 19 September 2026

C#	Name	Years as Captain	Debut		Games as Captain			Games for Club	Ref
C#	Name	Years as Captain	Date	Round	Solo	Joint	Total	Games for Club	Ref
1	Botille Vette-Welsh	2023–2024	23 Jul 2023	1	7	9	16	16	
1	Kezie Apps	2023–present	23 Jul 2023	1	22	9	31	31	
2	Christian Pio	2023	14 Sep 2023	9	1	0	1	34	
4	Raecene McGregor	2026	16 Aug 2026	7	2	0	2	12	

== Current squad ==
The team is coached by Brett Kimmorley. Jersey numbers in the table reflect the team list announced for Finals Week 1.
Table last updated on 19 September 2026.

J#	Player	Age	Position(s)	NRLW seasons				NRLW stats					Origin	Tests	All Stars
J#	Player	Age	Position(s)	Debut	2018-24	2025	2026	M	T	G	Pts	Prems	Origin	Tests	All Stars
1	Caitlin Turnbull	25	Fullback, Wing	2025	—	10	10	20	11	0	44	—	—	—	1
2	Harmony Crichton	19	Wing, Centre	2024	3	3	9	15	1	0	4	—	—	—	—
3	Rikeya Horne	27	Centre, Wing	2018	7 11 16	P	3	37	10	0	40	—	—	—	—
4	Portia Bourke	26	Centre, Lock	2025	—	4	9	13	0	0	0	—	—	—	—
5	Lily Rogan	22	Wing, Centre	2023	1	10	12	23	6	0	24	—	—	2	—
6	Losana Lutu	22	Five-eighth, Halfback	2022	1 12	4	9	26	4	3	22	—	—	2	—
7	Raecene McGregor	28	Halfback	2018	3 8 12 18	7	12	60	5	78	177	2 1	—	19	6
8	Sarah Togatuki	28	Prop, Lock	2018	19 16	11	12	58	9	0	36	1	11	1 5	—
9	Salma Nour	23	Hooker	2023	10	7	11	28	9	0	36	—	—	1	—
10	Shaniece Monschau	24	Prop, Second-row	2025	—	11	12	23	2	0	8	—	—	2	—
11	Kezie Apps	35	Second-row, Prop	2018	19 10	11	10	50	9	0	36	—	20	22	2
12	Shaylee Bent	26	Second-row, Centre	2019	19 20	12	12	63	8	0	32	—	4	4	7
13	Holli Wheeler	36	Lock, Prop	2018	20 17	9	11	57	2	2	12	—	3	5	—
14	Christian Pio	26	Prop, Second-row	2021	11 18	4	12	45	4	0	16	—	—	3	—
15	Shenai Lendill	26	Centre, Second-row	2023	18	11	11	40	3	0	12	—	—	—	—
16	Jetaya Faifua	23	Five-eighth, Fullback	2021	7 11	11	2	31	6	0	24	—	—	5	—
17	Brooke Talataina	22	Second-row, Halfback	2023	12	H	9	21	1	0	4	—	—	1	—
18	Tara Reinke	27	Lock, Prop	2023	7 9	11	7	34	0	0	0	—	—	—	—
19	Namoe Gesa	18	Centre	2026	—	R	8	8	2	0	8	—	—	—	—
20	Kayla Henderson	—	Fullback, Wing	2026	—	R	4	4	0	0	0	—	—	—	—
21	Emily Bass	27	Wing, Centre	2021	7 11	11	6	35	20	6	92	—	5	—	—
22	Tyla Amiatu	23	Prop, Lock	2023	13	1	2	16	2	0	8	—	—	—	—
–	Vasaliva Feleti	18	Centre, Wing	—	—	—	—	0	0	0	0	—	—	—	—
–	Lucyannah Luamanu-Leiataua	19	Lock, Second-row	2025	—	4	—	4	0	0	0	—	—	—	—
IJ	Faythe Manera	23	Five-eighth, Halfback	2025	—	9	10	19	9	0	36	—	—	—	—
Z	Harmony Kautai	22	Centre, Wing	—	—	RU	—	0	0	0	0	—	—	—	—
DV	Lahnayah Daniel	19	Lock	—	—	D	—	0	0	0	0	—	—	—	—
DV	Diamond Graham	18	Hooker	—	—	—	—	0	0	0	0	—	—	—	—
IJ	Leah Ollerton	22	Hooker	2026	—	R	1	1	0	0	0	—	—	—	—
IJ	Terina Te Tamaki	29	Centre, Wing	2025	—	4	—	4	0	0	0	—	—	—	—
P	Pihuka Berryman-Duff	25	Hooker, Lock	2023	9	11	P	20	1	0	4	—	—	6	—
P	Jade Fonua	29	Lock	2023	14	11	P	25	0	0	0	—	—	4	—

Notes:

- Pihuka Berryman-Duff will miss the 2026 season due to her pregnancy. Salma Nour was signed as her replacement in the squad.
- The following players are signed on a development contract for 2026:
  - Lahnayah Daniel (Canterbury Bulldogs, U19 9 games in 2025, Open 6 games in 2025)
  - Vasaliva Feleti (North Sydney Bears, U19 5 games in 2026)
  - Diamond Graham (Tweed Heads Seagulls, U19, 2 games in 2026)
  - Kayla Henderson (Penrith Panthers, U19 10 games in 2025, Newcastle Knights Open 12 games in 2025)
- The following players were signed on a development contract for 2025:
  - Tallara Bamblett (Parramatta Eels, Open 7 games in 2024)
  - Aaliyah Bula
  - Tiresa Leasuasu (Wests Tigers, U19 8 games in 2025)
  - Lucyannah Luamanu-Leiataua (Wests Tigers, U19 10 games in 2025, Open 9 games in 2024)

The Wests Tigers announced contract extensions in several instalments from October 2025. The Wests Tigers announced player signings in several instalments from October 2025.

=== Players out ===
Off contract

- Tyla Amiatu (Sup)
- Shaylee Bent (Rpl)
- Pihuka Berryman-Duff (Pregnancy)
- Portia Bourke
- Harmony Crichton
- Jetaya Faifua
- Jade Fonua (Pregnancy)
- Kayla Henderson (Dev)
- Losana Lutu
- Faythe Manera
- Salma Nour (Rpl)
- Lily Rogan
- Brooke Talataina
- Terina Te Tamaki
- Holli Wheeler

==== Off contract after 2027 ====
- Emily Bass
- Namoe Gesa
- Rikeya Horne
- Shenai Lendill
- Lucyannah Luamanu-Leiataua
- Raecene McGregor
- Shaniece Monschau
- Leah Ollerton
- Christian Pio
- Tara Reinke

== Club records ==
Win-loss record since entering the NRLW in 2023:

Games	Wins	Drawn	Loss	Points for	Points against	+/-	Win %
40	12	0	28	583	989	–406	30.00%

=== Player records ===
Lists and tables last updated: 19 September 2026.

==== Career records (at Wests Tigers) ====
===== Most games for the Tigers =====
Qualification: 20 games

Rank	Player	Span	Games
1	Sarah Togatuki	2023–	39
2	Christian Pio	2023–	34
3	Kezie Apps	2023–	31
4	Salma Nour	2023–	28
5	Tara Reinke	2024–	27
6	Losana Lutu	2023–	25
7	Lily Rogan	2025–	22
8	Brooke Talataina	2023–24, 2026–	21
9	Caitlin Turnbull	2025–	20

===== Most points for the Tigers =====
Qualification: 20 points

Rank	Player	2026 club	M	T	G	FG	Points
1	Raecene McGregor		12	3	33	1	79
2	Pauline Piliae-Rasabale		18	1	28	0	60
3	Caitlin Turnbull		20	11	0	0	44
3	Emily Bass		17	8	6	0	44
5	Salma Nour		28	9	0	0	36
5	Faythe Manera		19	9	0	0	36
7	Kezie Apps		31	7	0	0	28
8	Rikeya Horne		19	6	0	0	24
8	Rebecca Pollard	—	17	6	0	0	24
8	Leianne Tufuga		16	6	0	0	24
8	Lily Rogan		22	6	0	0	24
12	Losana Lutu		25	4	3	0	22
13	Sarah Togatuki		39	5	0	0	20

===== Most tries for the Tigers =====
Qualification: 5 tries

Rank	Player	Tries
1	Caitlin Turnbull	11
2	Salma Nour	9
2	Faythe Manera	9
4	Emily Bass	8
5	Kezie Apps	7
6	Rikeya Horne	6
6	Rebecca Pollard	6
6	Leianne Tufuga	6
6	Lily Rogan	6
10	Sarah Togatuki	5

===== Most goals for the Tigers =====
All goal kickers

Rank	Player	Goals
1	Raecene McGregor	33
2	Pauline Piliae-Rasabale	28
3	Emily Bass	6
4	Losana Lutu	3
5	Emily Curtain	1

===== Most field goals for the Tigers =====
One instance to date

Rank	Player	Field goals
1	Raecene McGregor	1

==== Season records ====
Season length has increased over time as the competition has expanded.

===== Most points in a season for the Tigers =====
Qualification: 20 points

Rank	Player	Season	M	T	G	FG	Points
1	Raecene McGregor	2026	12	3	33	1	79
2	Caitlin Turnbull	2025	10	8	0	0	32
2	Faythe Manera	2026	10	8	0	0	32
4	Pauline Piliae-Rasabale	2023	9	0	15	0	30
4	Pauline Piliae-Rasabale	2024	9	1	13	0	30
6	Emily Bass	2025	11	3	6	0	24
7	Kezie Apps	2023	7	5	0	0	20
7	Leianne Tufuga	2023	9	5	0	0	20
7	Emily Bass	2026	6	5	0	0	20
7	Lily Rogan	2026	12	5	0	0	20

===== Most tries in a season for the Tigers =====
Qualification: 4 tries

Rank	Player	Season	M	Tries
1	Caitlin Turnbull	2025	10	8
1	Faythe Manera	2026	10	8
3	Kezie Apps	2023	7	5
3	Leianne Tufuga	2023	9	5
3	Emily Bass	2026	6	5
3	Lily Rogan	2026	12	5
7	Rikeya Horne	2023	8	4
7	Jakiya Whitfeld	2023	9	4
7	Rebecca Pollard	2024	6	4
7	Salma Nour	2026	11	4

==== Match records ====
===== Most points in a game for the Tigers =====
Qualification: 10 points

Rank	Player	Date	Opponent	Venue	T	G	FG	Points
1	Raecene McGregor	1 Aug 2026	Sharks	Geohex Park, Wagga Wagga	2	4	0	16
2	Caitlin Turnbull	20 Jul 2025	Titans	Leichhardt Oval	3	0	0	12
2	Leianne Tufuga	6 Aug 2023	Raiders	GIO Stadium	3	0	0	12
2	Faythe Manera	11 Jul 2026	Cowboys	Queensland Country Bank Stadium	3	0	0	12
2	Raecene McGregor	30 Aug 2026	Bulldogs	Campbelltown Stadium	0	6	0	12
6	Pauline Piliae-Rasabale	25 Aug 2024	Broncos	Leichhardt Oval	1	3	0	10
6	Raecene McGregor	11 Jul 2026	Cowboys	Queensland Country Bank Stadium	0	5	0	10
6	Raecene McGregor	16 Aug 2026	Warriors	CommBank Stadium	0	5	0	10

===== Most tries in a game for the Tigers =====
Qualification: 2 tries

Rank	Player	Date	Opponent	Venue	Tries
1	Leianne Tufuga	6 Aug 2023	Raiders	Leichhardt Oval	3
1	Caitlin Turnbull	20 Jul 2025	Titans	Leichhardt Oval	3
1	Faythe Manera	11 Jul 2026	Cowboys	Queensland Country Bank Stadium	3
4	Leianne Tufuga	23 Jul 2023	Eels	CommBank Stadium	2
4	Jakiya Whitfeld	23 Jul 2023	Eels	CommBank Stadium	2
4	Rebecca Pollard	12 Sep 2024	Dragons	Leichhardt Oval	2
4	Caitlin Turnbull	27 Jul 2025	Sharks	Sharks Stadium	2
4	Jetaya Faifua	17 Aug 2025	Dragons	Allianz Stadium	2
4	Caitlin Turnbull	30 Aug 2025	Raiders	GIO Stadium	2
4	Raecene McGregor	1 Aug 2026	Sharks	Geohex Park, Wagga Wagga	2
4	Emily Bass	1 Aug 2026	Sharks	Geohex Park, Wagga Wagga	2
4	Lily Rogan	16 Aug 2026	Warriors	CommBank Stadium	2
4	Faythe Manera	30 Aug 2026	Bulldogs	Campbelltown Stadium	2
4	Lily Rogan	30 Aug 2026	Bulldogs	Campbelltown Stadium	2
4	Salma Nour	30 Aug 2026	Bulldogs	Campbelltown Stadium	2

===== Most goals in a game for the Tigers =====
Qualification: 4 goals

Rank	Player	Date	Opponent	Venue	Goals
1	Raecene McGregor	30 Aug 2026	Bulldogs	Campbelltown Stadium	6
2	Raecene McGregor	11 Jul 2026	Cowboys	Queensland Country Bank Stadium	5
2	Raecene McGregor	16 Aug 2026	Warriors	CommBank Stadium	5
4	Pauline Piliae-Rasabale	23 Jul 2023	Eels	CommBank Stadium	4
4	Raecene McGregor	5 Jul 2026	Eels	CommBank Stadium	4
4	Raecene McGregor	1 Aug 2026	Sharks	Geohex Park, Wagga Wagga	4

==== Oldest and youngest players ====
The oldest and youngest players to represent the Wests Tigers Women's NRLW team.

Name	Age	Year
Kezie Apps	34 and 222 days	2025
Lucyannah Luamanu-Leiataua	18 and 120 days	2025

==== First try and last try ====
Players who scored the first try and most recent try for the Tigers.

Name	Year	Round	Minute	Opponent
Botille Vette-Welsh	2023	1	6'	Eels
Salma Nour	2026	11	64'	Raiders

=== Margins and streaks ===
Biggest winning margins
Qualification: 10 point margin

Margin	Score	Opponent	Venue	Date	Round
30	44—14	Bulldogs	Campbelltown Stadium	30 Aug 2026	9
28	36—8	Eels	CommBank Stadium	23 Jul 2023	1
12	28—16	Eels	CommBank Stadium	5 Jul 2026	1
12	30—18	Cowboys	Queensland Country Bank Stadium	11 Jul 2026	2
12	32—20	Sharks	Geohex Park, Wagga Wagga	1 Aug 2026	5
10	10—0	Sharks	Belmore Sports Ground	30 Jul 2023	2

Biggest losing margins
Qualification: 20 point margin

Margin	Score	Opponent	Venue	Date	Round
58	0—58	Titans	Campbelltown Stadium	6 Sep 2026	10
38	10—48	Roosters	Allianz Stadium	26 Aug 2023	6
38	6—44	Warriors	Campbelltown Stadium	14 Sep 2025	11
38	10—48	Roosters	Leichhardt Oval	26 Jul 2026	4
34	4—38	Eels	CommBank Stadium	7 Sep 2025	10
30	4—34	Roosters	McDonald Jones Stadium	2 Aug 2025	5
30	14—44	Broncos	Leichhardt Oval	25 Aug 2024	5
28	6—34	Knights	McDonald Jones Stadium	1 Sep 2024	6
28	12–40	Broncos	Totally Workwear Stadium	19 Jul 2025	3
24	6—30	Knights	McDonald Jones Stadium	9 Aug 2025	6
24	4—28	Broncos	Totally Workwear Stadium	5 Jul 2025	1
22	8—30	Cowboys	Leichhardt Oval	24 Aug 2025	8
20	12—32	Raiders	Campbelltown Stadium	28 Jul 2024	1
20	8—28	Knights	Leichhardt Oval	14 Sep 2023	9

Most consecutive wins

- 5 (1 August 2026 — 30 August 2026)

Most consecutive losses

- 14 (6 August 2023 — 7 September 2024)
- 6 (5 July 2025 — 9 August 2025)

Biggest comeback

- Recovered from 4 point deficit to win (thrice)
  - Trailed Parramatta Eels 4-8 after 50 minutes at CommBank Stadium on July 23 2023 and won 36-8
  - Trailed Cronulla Sharks 6-10 after 50 minutes at PointsBet Stadium on September 19 2024 and won 12-10
  - Trailed Cronulla Sharks 0-4 after 6 minutes at Geohex Park, Wagga Wagga on August 1 2026 and won 32-20

Worst Collapse

- Surrendered 12 point lead. Led Brisbane Broncos 12-0 after 19 minutes at Leichhardt Oval on August 25 2024 and lost 14-44

First game and first win

Result	Score	Opponent	Venue	Date
Won	36–8	Parramatta Eels	CommBank Stadium	23 Jul 2023

== Individual awards ==
=== Players of the Year ===
The Wests Tigers Women Player of the Year award winners since 2023.

Year	Player of the Year	Player's Player	Rookie of the Year	Ref
2023	Sarah Togatuki	Sarah Togatuki	Eliza Siilata	
2024	Sarah Togatuki	Brooke Talataina	Natasha Penitani	
2025	Sarah Togatuki	Caitlin Turnbull	Caitlin Turnbull	
2026	Raecene McGregor	Shaylee Bent	Namoe Gesa	

== Players ==
=== Inaugural 2023 squad ===
Wests Tigers Women 2023 squad
Top 24 squad - 2023 NRL season			Development list	Coaching staff
Bianca Bennetts – PR; Botille Vette-Welsh (c) – FB; Christian Pio – PR; Ebony Prior – HK; Eliza Siilata – SR; Emily Curtain – HB; Folau Vaki – SR; Hope Tevaga – CE; Imogen Gobran – PR; Jakiya Whitfeld – WG	Jessica Kennedy – PR; Josie Lenaz – WG; Kezie Apps (c) – SR, PR; Leianne Tufuga – CE; Losana Lutu – LK, FE; Najvada George – LK; Pauline Piliae-Rasabale – FE; Rebecca Pollard – WG; Rikeya Horne – CE; Salma Nour – HK	Sarah Togatuki – PR; Sophie Curtain – PR; Taylor Osborne – SR; Tess Staines – FB, WG	Brooke Talataina – FE; Iemaima Etuale – SR; Jae Patu – CE; Tiana-Lee Thorne – FB	Head coach: Brett Kimmorley; Legend: (c) Captain(s); (vc) Vice-captain(s); Updated: 5 October 2023; Source(s): Wests Tigers,

=== First team ===
The first ever Wests Tigers Women team played the Parramatta Eels on 23 July 2023 at CommBank Stadium. The Wests Tigers Women won the match 36-8.

Jersey	Position	Player
1	Fullback	Botille Vette-Welsh (c)
2	Wing	Jakiya Whitfeld
3	Centre	Rikeya Horne
4	Centre	Leianne Tufuga
5	Wing	Josie Lenaz
6	Five-eighth	Pauline Piliae-Rasabale
7	Halfback	Emily Curtain
8	Prop	Sarah Togatuki
9	Hooker	Ebony Prior
10	Prop	Christian Pio
11	Second-row	Kezie Apps (c)
12	Second-row	Eliza Siliata
13	Lock	Najvada George
14	Hooker	Sophie Curtain
15	Halfback	Losana Lutu
16	Prop	Taylor Osborne
17	Prop	Folau Vaki
Coach		Brett Kimmorley

== Representative honours ==
=== National team representatives ===
Player	Club debut	Country	International debut	Years	Ref
Kezie Apps	23 Jul 2023	Australia	**9 Nov 2014**	2023–2025	
Pihuka Berryman-Duff	5 Jul 2025	Samoa	**15 Oct 2023**	2025	
Claudia Brown	12 Sep 2024	Samoa	10 Nov 2024	2024	
Jetaya Faifua	5 Jul 2025	Samoa	**19 Oct 2024**	2025	
Ruby Fifita	24 Aug 2025	Tonga	25 Oct 2025	2025	
Jade Fonua	5 Jul 2025	Tonga	**21 Oct 2023**	2025	
Najvada George	23 Jul 2023	New Zealand	14 Oct 2023	2023–2024	
Amelia Huakau	5 Jul 2025	Tonga	**25 Jun 2022**	2025	
Jessica Kennedy	6 Aug 2023	Netherlands	19 May 2024	2024	
Losana Lutu	23 Jul 2023	Fiji	26 Oct 2024	2024	
Salma Nour	19 Aug 2023	Lebanon	4 Oct 2025	2025	
Natasha Penitani	28 Jul 2024	Tonga	**25 Jun 2022**	2024	
Pauline Piliae-Rasabale	23 Jul 2023	Samoa	15 Oct 2023	2023–2024	
Christian Pio	23 Jul 2023	Samoa	19 Oct 2024	2024	
Rebecca Pollard	23 Jul 2023	Italy	4 Oct 2025	2025	
Jessikah Reeves	5 Jul 2025	Papua New Guinea	**1 Nov 2022**	2025	
Lily Rogan	5 Jul 2025	Ireland	21 Oct 2025	2025	
Brooke Talataina	3 Sep 2023	New Zealand	3 Nov 2024	2024	
Sarah Togatuki	23 Jul 2023	Australia	18 Oct 2024	2024–2025	
Leianne Tufuga	23 Jul 2023	New Zealand	14 Oct 2023	2023–2024	
Folau Vaki	23 Jul 2023	Tonga	21 Oct 2023	2023	
Jakiya Whitfeld	23 Jul 2023	Australia	28 Oct 2023	2023	

Notes:

- International Debut dates in **bold** indicate that the player made her first international appearance prior to playing for the Wests Tigers NRLW team.

=== Women's State of Origin representatives ===
Past and current players who have played for Queensland and New South Wales in the State of Origin.

Player	State	Year(s)
Kezie Apps	New South Wales	2023–2025
Sarah Togatuki	New South Wales	2023–2025
Emily Bass	Queensland	2025

=== Prime Minister's XIII representatives ===
Past and current players who have been selected to play in the Prime Minister's XIII.

Player	Year(s)
Jakiya Whitfeld	2023
Botille Vette-Welsh	2023
Caitlin Turnbull	2025

=== All-Stars representatives ===
Past and current players who have played for the Indigenous All-Stars or for the Māori All-Stars.

==== Indigenous All Stars ====
Player	Year(s)
Caitlin Turnbull	2026

==== Māori All Stars (Māori people) ====
Player	Year(s)
Raecene McGregor	2026

== Feeder team seasons ==
The Wests Tigers run women's pathways teams in the NSWRL Women's Premiership, the Tarsha Gale Cup, and the Lisa Fiaola Cup.

=== NSWRL Women's Premiership ===
Season	Regular season									Finals		Ref
Season	P	W	D	L	B	F	A	Pts	Pos	Top	Placing	Ref
2019	10	5	0	5	7	158	138	24	8th	8	Semi-finalist	
2020	6	2	1	3	1	76	76	7	4th	6	Semi-finalist	
2021	11	6	0	5	2	300	220	16	6th	6	Abandoned	
2022	8	5	0	3	1	140	116	12	4th	4	Premiers	
2023	10	4	0	6	1	165	232	10	9th	4	—	
2024	11	3	1	7	0	176	225	7	10th	4	—	
2025	11	5	0	6	0	186	242	10	8th	4	—	
2026	11	5	2	4	0	230	196	12	7th	5	—	

=== Tarsha Gale Cup ===
For Under 18 players from 2017 to 2020. Since 2021, the Cup is for Under 19 players.

Season	Regular season									Finals		Ref
Season	P	W	D	L	B	F	A	Pts	Pos	Top	Placing	Ref
2017	7	0	0	7	1	50	249	2	9th	8	—	
2018	8	7	0	1	1	346	122	16	3rd	8	Semi-finalist	
2019	9	7	0	2	0	240	132	14	3rd	8	Semi-finalist	
2020	5	2	0	3	0	58	118	4	7th	8	—	
2021	8	5	0	3	1	145	150	12	4th	6	Elimination finalist	
2022	8	5	1	2	1	132	106	13	4th	6	Semi-finalist	
2023	8	1	0	7	1	64	202	4	13th	6	—	
2024	8	3	0	5	1	100	232	8	9th	6	—	
2025	8	6	0	2	1	140	80	14	3rd	8	Semi-finalist	
2026	8	3	1	4	1	134	130	9	8th	8	Elimination finalist	

=== Lisa Fiaola Cup ===
For Under 17 players.

Season	Regular season									Finals		Ref
Season	P	W	D	L	B	F	A	Pts	Pos	Top	Placing	Ref
2024	8	6	0	2	1	218	108	14	5th	6	Grand finalist	
2025	8	5	0	3	1	216	130	12	5th	8	Preliminary finalist	
2026	8	4	0	4	1	128	116	10	8th	8	Semi-finalist	
