= Emily Bass =

Australian rugby league & union footballer (born 1999)

Personal information
- Born: 1 October 1998 (age 28) Toowoomba, Queensland, Australia
- Height: 161 cm (5 ft 3 in)
- Weight: 66 kg (10 st 6 lb)

Playing information

Rugby union
Club
Years	Team	Pld	T	G	FG	P
2021	Queensland Reds

Rugby league
- Position: Wing, Centre
Club
Years	Team	Pld	T	G	FG	P
2021–22	Brisbane Broncos	7	4	0	0	16
2023–24	Gold Coast Titans	11	8	0	0	22
2025–	Wests Tigers	17	8	6	0	44
	Total	35	20	6	0	82
Representative
Years	Team	Pld	T	G	FG	P
2022–25	Queensland	5	3	0	0	12
- Source: RLP As of 2 November 2026
- Education: Scots PGC College
- Relatives: Rachael Pearson (cousin)

Emily Bass (born 1 October 1998) is an Australian rugby league footballer who plays as a winger or centre for the Wests Tigers in the NRL Women's Premiership.

== Background ==
Born in Toowoomba, Queensland, Bass attended Scots PGC College in Warwick, Queensland, where she was a state champion hurdler.

== Playing career ==
=== Queensland Reds (Super W) ===
In 2021, Bass played for the Queensland Reds in the Super W and represented the Oceania Barbarians at the 2021 Oceania Sevens Championship.

=== Brisbane Broncos ===
In 2022, Bass switched to rugby league, joining the Brisbane Broncos for the rescheduled 2021 season.

In Round 1 of the 2021 NRL Women's season, Bass made her debut for the Broncos, scoring two tries in a win over the Sydney Roosters.

=== Gold Coast Titans ===
On 4 April 2023 it was reported that she would join Gold Coast Titans

=== Wests Tigers ===
On 9 May 2025, it was announced that Bass had joined Wests Tigers for the 2025 season.
