= Sarah Togatuki =

Australia and Samoa international rugby league footballer (born 1997)

Personal information
- Born: 14 October 1997 (age 29) Auburn, New South Wales, Australia
- Height: 157 cm (5 ft 2 in)
- Weight: 65 kg (10 st 3 lb)

Playing information
- Position: Prop
Club
Years	Team	Pld	T	G	FG	P
2018	Sydney Roosters	3	0	0	0	0
2020–22	Sydney Roosters	16	4	0	0	16
2023–	Wests Tigers	39	5	0	0	20
	Total	58	9	0	0	36
Representative
Years	Team	Pld	T	G	FG	P
2018	Prime Minister's XIII	1	0	0	0	0
2019	Samoa	1	0	0	0	0
2020–25	New South Wales	11	0	0	0	0
2024–26	Australia	7	0	0	0	0
- Source: RLP As of 16 November 2026

Sarah Togatuki (born 14 October 1997) is an Australian rugby league footballer who plays as a proper for the Wests Tigers in the NRL Women's Premiership and for the St Marys Saints in the NSWRL Women's Premiership.

She is a Samoan, Australian and New South Wales representative.

== Background ==
Togatuki was born in Auburn, New South Wales. With three older siblings, she was the first to be born in Australia to Samoan parents. Her family lived in a Housing Commission home. She said, "There's no shame in growing up in Housing Commission, we have pride in that stuff because it builds our character to what it is. My parents are quiet achievers. They hardly have time to rest. From Monday to Saturday, Dad is working 4am to 9pm and he preaches on a Sunday. That plays a part in my character and why I always want to give back."

Togatuki began playing rugby league for the Glenmore Park Brumbies.

== Playing career ==
In 2018, Togatuki joined the Sydney Roosters NRL Women's Premiership team. In Round 1 of the 2018 NRL Women's season, she made her debut for the Roosters in a 4–10 loss to the New Zealand Warriors. On 30 September 2018, she came off the bench in the Roosters Grand Final loss to the Brisbane Broncos.

On 6 October 2018, she represented the Prime Minister's XIII in their 40–4 win over Papua New Guinea.

In May 2019, she represented NSW City at the Women's National Championships. On 22 June 2019, she started on the wing for Samoa in their 8–46 loss to New Zealand. In July 2019, she joined the St George Illawarra Dragons NRLW team but did not play a game for the club.

In September 2020, Togatuki rejoined the Roosters NRLW team. On 25 October 2020, she started at second-row in the Roosters 10–20 Grand Final loss to the Broncos. The Roosters made the grand final again in the 2021 season (played in 2022 due to COVID-19), but Togatuki was a risk of not playing, facing the judiciary in the week before the match. Cleared to play, she was awarded the Karyn Murphy Medal for player of the match as Roosters beat the Dragons 14-6. Coach John Strange said, "She's the heart and soul of the club. It was a really good lift for the players when she was cleared to play."

On 13 November 2020, she made her debut for New South Wales in a 18–24 loss to Queensland at Sunshine Coast Stadium.

Togatuki was a regular for New South Wales from 2020 on, playing every game until 2025, including the first two-match series in 2023 and the first three-match series in 2024. In 2025, she was a member of the first NSW team to win a series. She played the final game of the series just 5 days after the death of her sister. Captain Isabelle Kelly said, "She's just an infectious type of person. She wasn't in camp with us for a bit and we really missed her and missed her presence. She puts everyone before herself and she's just really inspiring. A lot of us were saying we wouldn't have been able to do what she has done this week. I just know she would've done her family so proud."

With Wests Tigers joining the competition in 2023, Togatuki was one of their inaugural signings along with Kezie Apps and Botille Vette-Welsh. Coach Brett Kimmorley said, "Those three players are quality players, quality people, quality leaders, and we think it's very important signing for us as a club."

== Achievements and accolades ==
=== Representative ===
- Rugby League World Cup Champion: 2026
