= Pauline Piliae-Rasabale =

Australia & Samoa dual-code international rugby player

- Born: 3 February 1992 (age 34) Apia, Samoa
- Height: 1.75 m (5 ft 9 in)
- Weight: 78 kg (12 st 4 lb)
- School: Hills Sports High School

Rugby union career
- Position(s): Fullback, Centre, Fly half
Senior career
Years	Team	Apps	(Points)
- Waratahs
International career
Years	Team	Apps	(Points)
2022	Australia	7	(0)
- Rugby league career

Playing information
- Position: Five-eighth, Stand-off
Club
Years	Team	Pld	T	G	FG	P
2023–24	Wests Tigers	18	1	28	0	60
2025–	Gold Coast Titans	6	1	0	0	4
	Total	24	2	28	0	64
Representative
Years	Team	Pld	T	G	FG	P
2023–26	Samoa	7	0	20	0	40
- As of 13 November 2026

Pauline Piliae-Rasabale (born 3 February 1992) is an Australian rugby union & rugby league player. She plays five-eighth, halfback for the Gold Coast Titans in the NRL Women's Premiership competition and Samoa.

== Rugby Union ==
Piliae-Rasabale started in her international debut for Australia against Fiji on 6 May 2022 at the Suncorp Stadium in Brisbane. She also started against Japan in her second appearance for the Wallaroos a few days later. She was named in the squad for the 2022 Pacific Four Series. She started against the Black Ferns in the opening match of the Pacific Four series on 6 June.

Piliae-Rasabale was named in the Wallaroos squad for a two-test series against the Black Ferns at the Laurie O'Reilly Cup. She also made the team to the delayed 2022 Rugby World Cup in New Zealand.

== Rugby League ==
=== Wests Tigers ===
On 14 February 2023 it was reported that she had joined Wests Tigers

=== Gold Coast Titans ===
On 22 January 2025 it was reported that she had joined Gold Coast Titans
