= 2025 Canterbury-Bankstown Bulldogs NRLW season =

NRL rugby league season

- NRLW Rank: 9th
- Play-off result: Missed
- 2025 record: Wins: 3; draws: 1; losses: 7
- Points scored: For: 162; against: 310

Team information
- CEO: Aaron Warburton
- Head Coach: Brayden Wiliame
- Captains: Tayla Preston; Angelina Teakaraanga-Katoa
- Stadium: Accor Stadium; Belmore Sports Ground
- Avg. attendance: 9,922
- High attendance: 13,108 (Rd 6)
- Low attendance: 9,577 (Rd 1)

Top scorers
- Tries: Elizabeth MacGregor (7)
- Goals: Tayla Preston (21)
- Points: Tayla Preston (46)
List of seasons	2026 →

The 2025 Canterbury-Bankstown Bulldogs NRLW season is the club's 1st season in the professional NRL Women's Premiership (NRLW) football competition in Australia.

To mark 90 years since the club entered the then NSWRFL, the club unveiled a 90th anniversary logo on November 1, 2024 which will be worn on all playing jerseys in 2025.

It is Brayden Wiliame's first season as head coach of the club.

== Pre-season Trials ==
There was one Pre-season trial played in June, before the commencement of the regular season.

Trial: 21 June 2025	Parramatta Eels	18-24	Canterbury-Bankstown Bulldogs	Kellyville
18:00 AEST	Tries: Owen 29'; Fay 32'; Mataele 53'; Middleton 70'; Goals: Pearson 1/3 33'; Graham-Withell 0/1	[ Report]	Tries: Prior 4'; Dymock 7'; Mahakitau-Monschau 23'; Millard 66'; Goals: Preston 4/4 5', 8', 24', 67'	Stadium: Parramatta Eels Centre Of Excellence

== Regular season ==
=== Results by round ===
Round	1	2	3	4	5	6	7	8	9	10	11
Ground	H	A	H	A	A	H	A	H	A	H	A
Result	W	W	L	L	D	L	L	L	L	W	L
Position	5	3	5	7	6	8	8	9	11	8	9
Points	2	4	4	4	5	5	5	5	5	7	7

Source: National Rugby League
A = Away; H = Home; B = Bye; W = Win; D = Draw; L = Loss

=== Matches ===
The league fixtures were announced on 21 November 2024.

Win Draw Loss Fixtures

Round 1: 4 July 2025	Canterbury-Bankstown Bulldogs	26-12	Newcastle Knights	Sydney Olympic Park
17:40 AEST	Tries: Courtenay 29', 51'; Quinlan 33', 63'; Teakaraanga-Katoa 48'; Goals: Preston 3/5 34', 50', 52'	[ Report]	Tries: Roche 15'; Vette-Welsh 54'; Goals: Southwell 2/2 17', 55'	Stadium: Accor Stadium; Attendance: 9,577; Referee: Ziggy Przeklasa-Adam

Round 2: 10 July 2025	Wests Tigers	8-12	Canterbury-Bankstown Bulldogs	Campbelltown
19:45 AEDT	Tries: Bass 55'; Apps 58'; Goals: Lutu 0/2	[ Report]	Tries: Prior 24'; Tauaneai 27'; Goals: Preston 2/2 25', 28'; Sin bin: Teakaraanga-Katoa (yellow card) 65' to 70'	Stadium: Campbelltown Sports Stadium; Attendance: 1,504; Referee: Belinda Sharpe

Round 3: 19 July 2025	Canterbury-Bankstown Bulldogs	14-18	St. George Illawarra Dragons	Sydney Olympic Park
15:15 AEST	Tries: Tagoai 11'; Buleki 22'; Robinson 49'; Goals: Preston 1/3 24'	[ Report]	Tries: Bostock 3'; Browne 7'; Southwell 46'; Reh 69'; Goals: McGregor 1/4 4'	Stadium: Accor Stadium; Attendance: 12,217; Referee: Matt Noyen

Round 4: 26 July 2025	Sydney Roosters	42-22	Canterbury-Bankstown Bulldogs	Moore Park
15:15 AEST	Tries: Strange 5'; Kelly 20', 22'; Carlile 27'; Baxter 31'; Butler 34', 55'; Wood 60'; Goals: Kelleher 5/8 7', 24', 29', 34', 56'	[ Report]	Tries: MacGregor 46', 50'; Tagoai 65'; Quinlan 67'; Goals: Preston 3/4 47', 66', 67'	Stadium: Allianz Stadium; Attendance: 1,118; Referee: Matt Noyen

Round 5: 2 August 2025	Gold Coast Titans	14-14	Canterbury-Bankstown Bulldogs	Newcastle
12:15 AEST	Tries: Grey 10'; Penitani 25'; Solia 32'; Goals: Brown 1/3 26'; Sin bin: Solia (yellow card) 49' to 59'	[ Report]	Tries: MacGregor 28', 47'; Tagoai 40'; Goals: Preston 1/3 42'	Stadium: McDonald Jones Stadium; Attendance: 5,298; Referee: Dillan Wells

Round 6: 9 August 2025	Canterbury-Bankstown Bulldogs	6-34	New Zealand Warriors	Sydney Olympic Park
17:15 AEST	Tries: Hopoate 23'; Goals: Preston 1/1 24'	[ Report]	Tries: Takimoana 2'; Maliepo 12', 47'; Ikenasio 43'; Wetere 55', 59'; Goals: Maliepo 5/7 13', 32 pen', 45', 48', 59'	Stadium: Accor Stadium; Attendance: 13,108; Referee: Mitch Currie

Round 7: 17 August 2025	North Queensland Cowboys	22-6	Canterbury-Bankstown Bulldogs	Townsville
18:15 AEST	Tries: Dibb 14'; Peacock 17'; Whitfeld 44'; Peters 59'; Goals: Dibb 3/4 15', 18', 45'	[ Report]	Tries: Courtenay 50'; Goals: Preston 1/1 51'	Stadium: Queensland Country Bank Stadium; Attendance: 3,360; Referee: Tori Wilkie

Round 8: 23 August 2025	Canterbury-Bankstown Bulldogs	24-56	Canberra Raiders	Belmore
12:45 AEST	Tries: Teakaraanga-Katoa 17'; Tauaneai 33', 45'; Robinson 66'; Goals: Preston 4/4 18', 34', 46', 66'; Sin bin: Monschau (yellow card) 42' to 52'	[ Report]	Tries: Wiki 1'; Taufa 8', 26'; Saunders 13'; Simpson 23'; Preston 41', 59'; Waterman 51', 56'; Robins-Reti 59'; Goals: Temara 8/10 10', 15', 24', 28', 42', 55', 57', 60'	Stadium: Belmore Sports Ground; Attendance: 2,535; Referee: Tori Wilkie

Round 9: 31 August 2025	Brisbane Broncos	44-0	Canterbury-Bankstown Bulldogs	Brisbane
13:45 AEST	Tries: Maddick 3'; Upton 24', 44', 49', 65'; Robinson 37'; Johnson 46'; Joseph 55'; Broughton 62'; Goals: Temara 4/9 4', 26', 45', 56'	[ Report]		Stadium: Totally Workwear Stadium; Attendance: 1,724; Referee: Luke Saldern

Round 10: 6 September 2025	Canterbury-Bankstown Bulldogs	24-14	Cronulla-Sutherland Sharks	Sydney Olympic Park
17:15 AEST	Tries: Lokotui 18'; MacGregor 36'; Muru 39'; Preston 53'; Goals: Preston 4/5 19', 33 pen', 41', 55'	[ Report]	Tries: Johnston 21'; Taylor 49'; Hannaway 63'; Goals: Hannaway 1/2 64'; Kiria-Ratu 0/1	Stadium: Accor Stadium; Attendance: 12,174; Referee: Rochelle Tamarua

Round 11: 12 September 2025	Parramatta Eels	46-14	Canterbury-Bankstown Bulldogs	Parramatta
18:00 AEST	Tries: Takairangi 10', 68'; Ginn 25'; Church 29', 51'; Albert 43'; Pearson 55'; Cherrington 59'; Mataele 68'; Goals: Pearson 5/9 31', 44', 52', 57', 60'	Report	Tries: MacGregor 3', 19'; Robinson 48'; Goals: Preston 1/3 49'	Stadium: CommBank Stadium; Attendance: 803; Referee: Dillan Wells

=== Ladder ===
Pos	Team	Pld	W	D	L	PF	PA	PD	Pts	Qualification
1	Sydney Roosters	11	11	0	0	366	126	+240	22	Advance to second round of finals series (first-round bye)
2	Brisbane Broncos	11	10	0	1	404	116	+288	20	Advance to second round of finals series (first-round bye)
3	Newcastle Knights	11	7	0	4	258	203	+55	14	Advance to finals series
4	North Queensland Cowboys	11	7	0	4	186	176	+10	14	Advance to finals series
5	Cronulla-Sutherland Sharks	11	6	0	5	217	194	+23	12	Advance to finals series
6	Gold Coast Titans	11	5	1	5	171	194	−23	11	Advance to finals series
7	Parramatta Eels	11	5	0	6	202	234	−32	10	
8	New Zealand Warriors	11	4	0	7	194	198	−4	8	
9	Canterbury-Bankstown Bulldogs	11	3	1	7	162	310	−148	7	
10	St. George Illawarra Dragons	11	3	0	8	164	242	−78	6	
11	Canberra Raiders	11	3	0	8	183	325	−142	6	
12	Wests Tigers	11	1	0	10	100	289	−189	2	

Updated to match(es) played on 31 Aug 2025. Source: National Rugby League Women's

=== Inaugural squad ===
The Bulldogs first NRL match was against the Newcastle Knights on 4 July 2025 at Accor Stadium.

Canterbury-Bankstown Bulldogs Inaugural NRL Women's team
Starting team	Interchange	Coaching staff
1 Andie Robinson – FB; 2 Bridget Hoy – WG; 3 Simina Lokotui – CE; 4 Moana Courtenay – CE; 5 Adi Vani Buleki – WG; 6 Ashleigh Quinlan – FE; 7 Tayla Preston (c) – HB; 8 Angelina Teakaraanga-Katoa (c) – PR; 14 Shaquaylah Mahakitau-Monschau – HK; 10 Tegan Dymock – PR; 11 Alexis Tauaneai – SR; 12 Latisha Smythe – SR; 13 Holli Wheeler – LK	9 Ebony Prior – HK; 15 Shaniece Monschau – PR; 16 Shannon Muru – SR; 17 Kalosipani Hopoate – PR; Reserve: 18 Hope Millard – PR	Head coach: Brayden Wiliame; Legend: (c) Captain(s); (vc) Vice-captain(s); Updated: 4 July 2025; Source(s):

== See also ==
- 2025 Canterbury-Bankstown Bulldogs season
