= 2026 Canterbury-Bankstown Bulldogs NRLW season =

NRL rugby league season

- NRLW Rank: TBA
- Play-off result: TBA
- 2026 record: Wins: 3; draws: 0; losses: 4
- Points scored: For: 122; against: 184

Team information
- CEO: Aaron Warburton
- Head Coach: Brayden Wiliame
- Captains: Tayla Preston; Angelina Teakaraanga-Katoa
- Stadium: Accor Stadium; Belmore Sports Ground
- High attendance: 8,649 (Rd 2)
- Low attendance: 565 (Rd 6)

Top scorers
- Tries: Simina Lokotui (6)
- Goals: Tayla Preston (13)
- Points: Tayla Preston (26)
| ← 2025 | List of seasons | 2027 → |

The 2026 Canterbury-Bankstown Bulldogs NRLW season is the club's 2nd season in the professional NRL Women's Premiership (NRLW) football competition in Australia.

It is Brayden Wiliame's second season as head coach of the club.

== Pre-season Trials ==
There was one Pre-season trial played in June, before the commencement of the regular season.

| Trial: 19 June 2026 | Parramatta Eels | 36-6 | Canterbury-Bankstown Bulldogs | Merrylands |
| 18:15 AEST | Tries: Cherrington 9'; Albert 30'; Mataele 41', 48', 53'; Takairangi 57'; McWilliams 66'; Goals: Pearson 2/2 10', 32'; Beckett 1/4 42'; Kapua 1/1 67' | [ Report] | Tries: Jones 18'; Goals: Preston 1/1 19' | Stadium: Eric Tweedale Stadium |

== Regular season ==
=== Results by round ===
| Round | 1 | 2 | 3 | 4 | 5 | 6 | 7 | 8 | 9 | 10 | 11 |
|---|---|---|---|---|---|---|---|---|---|---|---|
| Ground | H | A | H | A | A | H | A | H | A | H | A |
| Result | L | L | W | W | L | W | L | | | | |
| Position | 10 | 11 | 9 | 7 | 8 | 8 | 8 | | | | |
| Points | 0 | 0 | 2 | 4 | 4 | 6 | 6 | | | | |

Source: National Rugby League
A = Away; H = Home; B = Bye; W = Win; D = Draw; L = Loss

=== Matches ===
The league fixtures were announced on 14 November 2025.

Win Draw Loss Fixtures

| Round 1: 5 July 2026 | New Zealand Warriors | 32-10 | Canterbury-Bankstown Bulldogs | Hamilton, New Zealand |
| 13:45 AEST | Tries: Broughton 20'; Paki 25', 35'; Ikenasio 38'; Tauhalaliku 41', 67'; Maliepo 54'; Goals: Maliepo 2/7 22', 55'; Sin bin: Hill-Moana (yellow card) 13' to 23' | Report | Tries: Tauaneai 60'; Tagoai 69'; Goals: Preston 1/2 61' | Stadium: FMG Stadium Waikato; Attendance: 4,928; Referee: Ziggy Przeklasa-Adam |

| Round 2: 11 July 2026 | Canterbury-Bankstown Bulldogs | 10-36 | Gold Coast Titans | Sydney Olympic Park |
| 15:15 AEDT | Tries: Millard 38'; Tagoai 52'; Goals: Preston 1/2 39' | Report | Tries: Chapman 7', 20', 46', 64'; Isa'ako 14'; Levi 57'; Grey 60'; Goals: Brown 4/7 9', 21', 47', 58' | Stadium: Accor Stadium; Attendance: 8,649; Referee: Liam Kennedy |

| Round 3: 18 July 2026 | Canterbury-Bankstown Bulldogs | 24-18 | Cronulla-Sutherland Sharks | Sydney Olympic Park |
| 17:15 AEST | Tries: MacGregor 3'; Lokotui 10', 16', 39'; Tagoai 53'; Goals: Preston 2/5 11', 55' | Report | Tries: Dodd 22'; Staples 28'; Tafua 68'; Goals: Kiria-Ratu 2/2 23', 30'; Hannaway 1/1 68' | Stadium: Accor Stadium; Attendance: 8,010; Referee: Rochelle Tamarua |

| Round 4: 25 July 2026 | Canterbury-Bankstown Bulldogs | 28-8 | St. George Illawarra Dragons | Sydney Olympic Park |
| 15:15 AEST | Tries: Jones 5'; Lokotui 20'; Roberts 37'; Fotu-Moala 43'; Robinson 60'; Goals: Preston 4/5 21', 38', 44', 61' | Report | Tries: Millard 31'; Ekepati 52'; Goals: Millard 0/2 | Stadium: Accor Stadium; Referee: Ethan Klein |

| Round 5: 2 August 2026 | Canterbury-Bankstown Bulldogs | 4-34 | Brisbane Broncos | Wagga Wagga |
| 11:50 AEST | Tries: Tagoai 38'; Goals: Preston 0/1 | Report | Tries: Dam 1'; Spreadborough 11'; Bartlett 34'; Upton 48'; Robinson 52'; Ferguson 62'; Goals: Southwell 5/6 12', 35', 49', 54', 63'; Sin bin: Brigginshaw (yellow card) 28' to 38' | Stadium: Geohex Park, Wagga Wagga; Attendance: 6,908; Referee: Rochelle Tamarua |

| Round 6: 8 August 2026 | Canterbury-Bankstown Bulldogs | 28-26 | North Queensland Cowboys | Belmore |
| 12:45 AEST | Tries: Lokotui 21', 37'; Millard 24'; Robinson 27'; MacGregor 31', 48'; Goals: Preston 2/6 22', 25'; Sin bin: Nankivell (yellow card) 8' to 18' | Report | Tries: Goldthorp 16'; Vella 40'; Marsters 44'; Tiana Raftstrand-Smith 58', 60'; Goals: Kelly 3/5 17', 59', 62' | Stadium: Belmore Sports Ground; Attendance: 565; Referee: Tori Wilkie |

| Round 7: 15 August 2026 | Parramatta Eels | 30-18 | Canterbury-Bankstown Bulldogs | Parramatta |
| 15:15 AEST | Tries: Todhunter 12'; Pearson 17'; Murphy 32'; Tohi-Hiku 34'; Church 62'; Goals: Pearson 5/5 14', 18', 33', 34', 63' | Report | Tries: Tagoai 42'; Roberts 47'; Tauaneai 50'; Goals: Preston 3/3 43', 48', 51'; Sin bin: Smythe (yellow card) 12' to 22'; Jones (yellow card) 52' to 62' | Stadium: CommBank Stadium; Referee: Karra-Lee Nolan |

| Round 8: 22 August 2026 | Canterbury-Bankstown Bulldogs | v | Canberra Raiders | Belmore |
| 15:15 AEST | | | | Stadium: Belmore Sports Ground |

| Round 9: 30 August 2026 | Wests Tigers | v | Canterbury-Bankstown Bulldogs | Campbelltown |
| 18:15 AEST | | | | Stadium: Campbelltown Sports Stadium |

| Round 10: 5 September 2026 | Newcastle Knights | v | Canterbury-Bankstown Bulldogs | Newcastle |
| 17:15 AEST | | | | Stadium: McDonald Jones Stadium |

| Round 11: 10 September 2026 | Sydney Roosters | v | Canterbury-Bankstown Bulldogs | Moore Park |
| 19:45 AEST | | | | Stadium: Allianz Stadium |

=== Ladder ===
| Pos | Team | Pld | W | D | L | PF | PA | PD | Pts | Qualification |
|---|---|---|---|---|---|---|---|---|---|---|
| 1 | Sydney Roosters | 7 | 7 | 0 | 0 | 234 | 82 | +152 | 14 | Advance to second round of finals series (first-round bye) |
| 2 | Gold Coast Titans | 7 | 6 | 0 | 1 | 198 | 98 | +100 | 12 | Advance to second round of finals series (first-round bye) |
| 3 | Brisbane Broncos | 7 | 5 | 0 | 2 | 200 | 110 | +90 | 10 | Advance to finals series |
| 4 | Wests Tigers | 7 | 5 | 0 | 2 | 158 | 176 | −18 | 10 | Advance to finals series |
| 5 | Canberra Raiders | 7 | 4 | 0 | 3 | 159 | 104 | +55 | 8 | Advance to finals series |
| 6 | New Zealand Warriors | 7 | 4 | 0 | 3 | 164 | 130 | +34 | 8 | Advance to finals series |
| 7 | Newcastle Knights | 7 | 3 | 0 | 4 | 142 | 105 | +37 | 6 | |
| 8 | Canterbury-Bankstown Bulldogs | 7 | 3 | 0 | 4 | 122 | 184 | −62 | 6 | |
| 9 | North Queensland Cowboys | 7 | 2 | 0 | 5 | 106 | 218 | −112 | 4 | |
| 10 | Cronulla-Sutherland Sharks | 7 | 1 | 0 | 6 | 108 | 160 | −52 | 2 | |
| 11 | St. George Illawarra Dragons | 7 | 1 | 0 | 6 | 64 | 174 | −110 | 2 | |
| 12 | Parramatta Eels | 7 | 1 | 0 | 6 | 96 | 210 | −114 | 2 | |

Updated to match(es) played on 03 Jul 2026. Source: National Rugby League Women's

== See also ==
- 2026 Canterbury-Bankstown Bulldogs season
