= 2025 NRL Women's season =

Australian women's rugby league season

NRL Telstra Women's Premiership
- Duration: 3 July 2025 to 5 October 2025
- Teams: 12
- Premiers: Brisbane Broncos (4th title)
- Minor premiers: Sydney Roosters (2nd title)
- Highest attendance: 46,288; Broncos vs Roosters; Accor Stadium; 5 October, Grand Final
- Lowest attendance: 618; Eels vs Knights; Eric Tweedale Stadium; 27 July, Round 4
- Broadcast partners: Nine Network; Fox League; Sky Sport (NZ); Sky Sports (UK)
- Wooden spoon: Wests Tigers (2nd spoon)
- Biggest home win: Broncos 50–4 Cowboys; Totally Workwear Stadium; 13 September, Round 11
- Biggest away win: Raiders 6–56 Sharks; GIO Stadium; 12 July, Round 2
- Dally M Medal: Tamika Upton
- Top point-scorer: Romy Teitzel 116
- Top try-scorer: Tamika Upton 20

The 2025 NRL Women's season was the eighth professional season of the NRL Women's Premiership. The number of teams (twelve) was an increase on the 2024 season due to the readmission of the New Zealand Warriors and the introduction of the Canterbury-Bankstown Bulldogs. The expansion in 2025 was confirmed by the NRL in March 2024. The start date and duration of the season was confirmed by the NRL with the release of the draw on 21 November 2024.

== Teams ==
The ten teams that participated in the 2024 season returned for the 2025 season with the addition of the New Zealand Warriors, who returned after a four-season hiatus, and new entrant Canterbury-Bankstown Bulldogs.

Club	Season	Home ground(s)	Head coach	Captain(s)	Ref
Brisbane Broncos	8th season	Suncorp Stadium and Totally Workwear Stadium	Scott Prince	Ali Brigginshaw (13) and Tamika Upton (13)	
Canberra Raiders	3rd season	GIO Stadium	Darrin Borthwick	Simaima Taufa (11) and Zahara Temara (10)	
Canterbury-Bankstown Bulldogs	1st Season	Accor Stadium and Belmore Sports Ground	Brayden Wiliame	Tayla Preston (11) and Angelina Teakaraanga-Katoa (10)	
Cronulla Sharks	3rd season	PointsBet Stadium	Tony Herman	Tiana Penitani-Gray (12) also Quincy Dodd (1: Round 6)	
Gold Coast Titans	5th season	Cbus Super Stadium	Karyn Murphy	Georgia Hale (11) also Lauren Brown (1, Round 3)	
Newcastle Knights	5th season	McDonald Jones Stadium	Ben Jeffries	Yasmin Clydsdale (13)	
New Zealand Warriors	4th season	Mount Smart Stadium and FMG Stadium Waikato	Ronald Griffiths	Apii Nicholls (10) also Harata Butler (1: Round 7)	
North Queensland Cowboys	3rd season	Queensland Country Bank Stadium	Ricky Henry	Kirra Dibb (9) and Emma Manzelmann (12)	
Parramatta Eels	5th season	CommBank Stadium and Eric Tweedale Stadium	Steve Georgallis	Mahalia Murphy (8) also Abbi Church (3: Rounds 1, 2 & 11)	
St. George Illawarra Dragons	8th season	WIN Stadium and Netstrata Jubilee Stadium	Nathan Cross	Raecene McGregor (7) and Zali Hopkins (11)	
Sydney Roosters	8th season	Allianz Stadium and Polytec Stadium	John Strange	Isabelle Kelly (12) also Olivia Kernick (1: Round 10)	
Wests Tigers	3rd season	Leichhardt Oval, Campbelltown Sports Stadium and Allianz Stadium	Brett Kimmorley	Kezie Apps (11)	

Notes:

- In the Captain(s) column
  - The number next to the name indicates the number of games played as captain
  - The word and indicates joint captains. Of the five clubs that employed joint captains only one, the Broncos, had both appear in every match.
  - The word also indicates the player deputised as captain when the regular captain missed one or more matches.
- New head coach appointments were
  - Brayden Williame (Bulldogs) — Announced in early April 2025. This followed the resignation in January 2025 of original appointee Blake Cavellero.
  - Ronald Griffiths (Warriors) — Announced in early July 2024.
  - Nathan Cross (Dragons) — Announced in late October 2024.
- Brett Kimmorley (Wests Tigers) elected not to apply for an extension to his contract.

== Scheduling ==
The start, duration, and conclusion of the 2025 season was influenced by several factors.

- A seven-week preparation period.
- Two weeks of leave.
- A change to the format of the final series from four teams over two weeks to six teams over three weeks. Winners of 3rd place versus 6th place and 4th place versus 5th place in Week 1 meet 1st place and 2nd place in Week 2 semi-finals. Winners of the semi-finals meet in the Grand Final in Week 3.
- Decision on the length of the regular season to use the minimum of eleven rounds required for the twelve teams to play each of their opponents once.
- A three-match Women's State of Origin series on 1 May (in Brisbane), 15 May (in Sydney), and 29 May (in Newcastle) 2025. All three matches are to be played on Thursday nights.
  - The 1st match was brought forward from 16 May (2024) to 1 May (2025). The 1st match again preceded Magic Round.
  - Matches were two weeks apart in 2025, whereas they were three weeks apart in 2024.

Both the New South Wales and Queensland State premiership competitions ran in parallel with the 2025 NRLW season. This was a scheduling change for Queensland, which in 2024 ran from early March to late May.

== Trial matches ==
On 5 June 2025, the NRL announced a trial match between the Brisbane Broncos and Papua New Guinea Orchids. On 10 June, the Newcastle Knights announced their team for a trial match on the following Sunday. The Gold Coast Titans announced a trail match against the North Queensland Cowboys, with the teams playing for the Brittany Breayley-Nati–Jenni-Sue Hoepper Shield as they did in 2024. On 16 June 2025, the Cronulla Sharks announced a trail for the following Sunday. On 17 June 2025, the Wests Tigers announced a trail and their team for the following Sunday. On the same day, the Canterbury Bulldogs announced a trail and their team for the following Saturday evening.

Home	Score	Away	Match information					
Home	Score	Away	Date and time	Format	Venue	Referees	Attendance	Reports
Newcastle Knights	20–12	Canberra Raiders	Sunday 15 June 2025; 12:00 PM	NRLW	Cessnock Sports Ground			
Gold Coast Titans	16–8	North Queensland Cowboys	Saturday 21 June 2025; 3:00 PM	NRLW	Piggabeen Sports Complex			
Parramatta Eels	18–24	Canterbury-Bankstown Bulldogs	Saturday 21 June 2025; 6:00 PM	NRLW	Parramatta Eels Centre of Excellence, Kellyville			
Brisbane Broncos	48–0	PNG Orchids	Sunday 22 June 2025; 11:45 AM	NRLW; NRL	Suncorp Stadium			
Wests Tigers	4–12	St. George Illawarra Dragons	Sunday 22 June 2025; 1:00 PM	NRLW	Leichhardt Oval			
Cronulla-Sutherland Sharks	12–12	Sydney Roosters	Sunday 22 June 2025; 1:30 PM	NRLW	Sharks Stadium			

== Regular season ==
The first announcement of the 2025 NRLW season's fixtures was released by the NRL (at 11am AEST) on 21 November 2024.

There was a grand total of 66 regular season matches. The schedule included 33 double-headers, 18 of which featured the same away club (marked in bold in the Format column). There were 15 double-headers where the home club was the same but teams from two different away clubs featured.

On 17 February 2025, the New Zealand Warriors announced that the last three of their five home games would be played at FMG Stadium Waikato in Hamilton.

Notes regarding the Format column of the below tables:

- **NRLW NRL** (in bold) indicates that the away team was the same for both matches.
- NRLW NRL (in plan text) indicates that the away team for the NRL match was from a different club.
- Where NRLW is listed second, the NRLW game was played after the NRL game.

=== Round 1 ===
Home	Score	Away	Match information					
Home	Score	Away	Date and time	Format	Venue	Referees	Attendance	Reports
Cronulla-Sutherland Sharks	16–18	Parramatta Eels	Thursday 3 July; 7:45 PM	NRLW (Only)	Sharks Stadium	Belinda Sharpe	1,524	
Canterbury-Bankstown Bulldogs	26–12	Newcastle Knights	Friday 4 July; 5:40 PM	NRLW; NRL	Accor Stadium	Ziggy Przeklasa-Adamski	9,577	
Brisbane Broncos	28 – 4	Wests Tigers	Saturday 5 July; 12:45 PM	NRLW (Only)	Totally Workwear Stadium	Tori Wilkie	1,802	
Canberra Raiders	14–36	St. George Illawarra Dragons	Saturday 5 July; 3:15 PM	**NRLW**; **NRL**	GIO Stadium	Clayton Wills	6,100	
North Queensland Cowboys	20–6	Gold Coast Titans	Saturday 5 July; 5:15 PM	NRLW; NRL	Queensland Country Bank Stadium	Tyson Brough	8,112	
Sydney Roosters	30–6	New Zealand Warriors	Sunday 6 July; 11:50 AM	NRLW; NRL	Allianz Stadium	Mitchell Currie	6,829	

Notes:
- Attendance at Accor Stadium was NRLW 9,577 and NRL 25,234 (versus Brisbane).
- Attendance at GIO Stadium was NRLW 6,100 and NRL 15,932.
- Attendance at Queensland Country Bank Stadium was NRLW 8,112 and NRL 20,383 (versus Melbourne).
- Attendance at Allianz Stadium was NRLW 6,829 and NRL 24,311 (versus Wests Tigers).

=== Round 2 ===
Home	Score	Away	Match information					
Home	Score	Away	Date and time	Format	Venue	Referees	Attendance	Reports
Wests Tigers	8–12	Canterbury-Bankstown Bulldogs	Thursday 10 July; 7:45 PM	NRLW (Only)	Campbelltown Sports Ground	Belinda Sharpe	1,504	
Canberra Raiders	6–56	Cronulla-Sutherland Sharks	Saturday 12 July; 12:45 PM	NRLW (Only)	GIO Stadium	Mitchell Currie	1,677	
St. George Illawarra Dragons	10–24	Sydney Roosters	Saturday 12 July; 3:15 PM	**NRLW**; **NRL**	Netstrata Jubilee Stadium	Kasey Badger	5,829	
North Queensland Cowboys	6–26	Newcastle Knights	Saturday 12 July; 5:15 PM	NRLW; NRL	Queensland Country Bank Stadium	Tori Wilkie	7,268	
New Zealand Warriors	14–0	Parramatta Eels	Sunday 13 July; 11:50 AM	NRLW; NRL	Go Media Stadium	Ziggy Przeklasa-Adamski	10,660	
Gold Coast Titans	4–44	Brisbane Broncos	Sunday 13 July; 4:00 PM	**NRLW**; **NRL**	Cbus Super Stadium	Clayton Wills	10,768	

Notes:
- Attendance at Jubilee Stadium was NRLW 5,829 and NRL 13,856.
- Attendance at Queensland Country Bank Stadium was NRLW 7,268 and NRL 18,778 (versus Canterbury).
- Attendance at Go Media Stadium was NRLW 10,660 and NRL 24,112 (versus Wests Tigers).
- Attendance at Cbus Super Stadium was NRLW 10,768 and NRL 24,553.

=== Round 3 ===
Home	Score	Away	Match information					
Home	Score	Away	Date and time	Format	Venue	Referees	Attendance	Reports
Canberra Raiders	12–46	Parramatta Eels	Saturday 19 July; 12:40 PM	**NRLW**; **NRL**	GIO Stadium	Tori Wilkie	9,989	
Canterbury-Bankstown Bulldogs	14–18	St. George Illawarra Dragons	Saturday 19 July; 3:15 PM	**NRLW**; **NRL**	Accor Stadium	Clayton Wills	12,217	
Cronulla-Sutherland Sharks	14–16	North Queensland Cowboys	Saturday 19 July; 5:15 PM	NRLW (Only)	Sharks Stadium	Mitch Currie	1,686	
Wests Tigers	12–24	Gold Coast Titans	Sunday 20 July; 11:50 AM	**NRLW**; **NRL**	Leichhardt Oval	Luke Saldern	3,740	
Brisbane Broncos	26–30	Sydney Roosters	Sunday 20 July; 1:45 PM	NRLW (Only)	Totally Workwear Stadium	Ziggy Przeklasa-Adamski	1,924	
Newcastle Knights	36–20	New Zealand Warriors	Sunday 20 July; 6:15 PM	**NRL**; **NRLW**	McDonald Jones Stadium	Kasey Badger	3,348	

Notes:
- Attendance at GIO Stadium was NRLW 9,989 and NRL 20,751.
- Attendance at Accor Stadium was NRLW 12,217 and NRL 30,115.
- Attendance at Leichhardt Oval was NRLW 3,740 and NRL 16,073.
- Attendance at McDonald Jones Stadium was NRL 21,117 and NRLW 3,348.
- In all four double-headers the club that won the NRLW match lost the NRL match.

=== Round 4 ===
Home	Score	Away	Match information					
Home	Score	Away	Date and time	Format	Venue	Referees	Attendance	Reports
New Zealand Warriors	10–20	Gold Coast Titans	Saturday 26 July; 12:40 PM	**NRLW**; **NRL**	Go Media Stadium	Mitch Currie	9,400	
Sydney Roosters	42–22	Canterbury-Bankstown Bulldogs	Saturday 26 July; 3:15 PM	NRLW (Only)	Allianz Stadium	Luke Saldern	1,118	
North Queensland Cowboys	26–0	Canberra Raiders	Saturday 26 July; 5:15 PM	NRLW (Only)	Queensland Country Bank Stadium	Tori Wilkie	1,355	
Parramatta Eels	6–30	Newcastle Knights	Sunday 27 July; 12:00 PM	NRLW (Only)	Eric Tweedale Stadium	Ziggy Przeklasa-Adamski	618	
St. George Illawarra Dragons	6–30	Brisbane Broncos	Sunday 27 July; 1:45 PM	NRLW (Only)	WIN Stadium	Kasey Badger	1,864	
Cronulla-Sutherland Sharks	20–16	Wests Tigers	Sunday 27 July; 6:15 PM	NRLW (Only)	Sharks Stadium	Dillan Wells	1,018	

Notes:
- Attendance at Go Media Stadium was NRLW 9,400 and NRL 24,212.

=== Round 5 (NRLW Magic Round) ===
Home	Score	Away	Match information					
Home	Score	Away	Date and time	Format	Venue	Referees	Attendance	Reports
Gold Coast Titans	14–14	Canterbury-Bankstown Bulldogs	Saturday 2 August; 12:15 PM	NRLW; NRLW; NRLW	McDonald Jones Stadium	Dillan Wells	5,298	
Wests Tigers	4–34	Sydney Roosters	Saturday 2 August; 2:15 PM	NRLW; NRLW; NRLW	McDonald Jones Stadium	Tori Wilkie	5,298	
Brisbane Broncos	28–14	Cronulla-Sutherland Sharks	Saturday 2 August; 4:15 PM	NRLW; NRLW; NRLW	McDonald Jones Stadium	Mitch Currie	5,298	
North Queensland Cowboys	6–12	New Zealand Warriors	Sunday 3 August; 11:50 AM	NRLW; NRLW; NRLW	McDonald Jones Stadium	Ziggy Przeklasa-Adamski	6,093	
Newcastle Knights	18–0	Canberra Raiders	Sunday 3 August; 1:45 PM	NRLW; NRLW; NRLW	McDonald Jones Stadium	Kasey Badger	6,093	
Parramatta Eels	12–10	St. George Illawarra Dragons	Sunday 3 August; 3:45 PM	NRLW; NRLW; NRLW	McDonald Jones Stadium	Josh Eaton	6,093	

Notes:
- The match between Wests Tigers and Sydney Roosters was suspended due to lightning. Play was suspended at 3:12pm (after Sydney's fifth try) and resumed at 3:50pm.
- The match between Brisbane Broncos and Cronulla Sharks was interrupted due to lightning. Play was suspended at 4:41pm (after the conversion of Brisbane's first try) and resumed at 5:00pm.

=== Round 6 (NRLW Indigenous Round) ===
Home	Score	Away	Match information					
Home	Score	Away	Date and time	Format	Venue	Referees	Attendance	Reports
St. George Illawarra Dragons	6–20	Cronulla-Sutherland Sharks	Saturday 9 August; 12:45 PM	**NRLW**; **NRL**	Netstrata Jubilee Stadium	Belinda Sharpe	3,875	
Newcastle Knights	30–6	Wests Tigers	Saturday 9 August; 3:15 PM	NRLW (Only)	McDonald Jones Stadium	Damian Brady	1,637	
Canterbury-Bankstown Bulldogs	6–34	New Zealand Warriors	Saturday 9 August; 5:15 PM	**NRLW**; **NRL**	Accor Stadium	Mitch Currie	13,108	
Gold Coast Titans	8–24	Sydney Roosters	Sunday 10 August; 11:50 AM	NRLW; NRL	Cbus Super Stadium	Josh Eaton	4,528	
Canberra Raiders	28–44	Brisbane Broncos	Sunday 10 August; 1:45 PM	NRLW (Only)	GIO Stadium	Dillan Wells	1,614	
Parramatta Eels	10–14	North Queensland Cowboys	Sunday 10 August; 6:15 PM	**NRL**; **NRLW**	CommBank Stadium	Ziggy Przeklasa-Adamski	1,964	

Notes:
- Attendance at Jubilee Stadium was NRLW 3,875 and NRL 11,816.
- Attendance at Accor Stadium was NRLW 13,108 and NRL 25,377.
- Attendance at Cbus Super Stadium was NRLW 4,528 and NRL 14,957 (against South Sydney Rabbitohs).
- Attendance at CommBank Stadium was NRL 11,562 and NRLW 1,964.

=== Round 7 (NRLW Indigenous Round) ===
Home	Score	Away	Match information					
Home	Score	Away	Date and time	Format	Venue	Referees	Attendance	Reports
Cronulla-Sutherland Sharks	12–8	Gold Coast Titans	Saturday 16 August; 12:45 PM	**NRLW**; **NRL**	Sharks Stadium	Dillan Wells	2,476	
Brisbane Broncos	38–4	Parramatta Eels	Saturday 16 August; 3:15 PM	NRLW; NRL	Suncorp Stadium	Josh Eaton	12,812	
New Zealand Warriors	16–20	Canberra Raiders	Saturday 16 August; 5:15 PM	NRLW (Only)	FMG Stadium Waikato	Damian Brady	5,968	
Wests Tigers	16–12	St. George Illawarra Dragons	Sunday 17 August; 11:50 AM	NRLW; NRL	Allianz Stadium	Mitch Currie	1,803	
Sydney Roosters	30–14	Newcastle Knights	Sunday 17 August; 1:45 PM	NRLW (Only)	Polytec Stadium	Ziggy Przeklasa-Adamski	2,294	
North Queensland Cowboys	22–6	Canterbury-Bankstown Bulldogs	Sunday 17 August; 6:15 PM	NRL; NRLW	Queensland Country Bank Stadium	Tori Wilkie	3,360	

Notes:
- Central Coast Stadium was named for then sponsor, Industree Group, when the draw was announced in November 2024. The sponsor changed to Polytec during 2025, prior to Round 7.
- Attendance at Shark Park was NRLW 2,476 and NRL 10,112.
- Attendance at Suncorp Stadium was NRLW 12,812 and NRL 44,350 (versus Dolphins).
- Attendance at Allianz Stadium was NRLW 1,803 and NRL 13,105 (versus Manly).
- Attendance at Queensland Country Bank Stadium was NRL 16,640 (versus Newcastle) and NRLW 3,360.
- All four clubs that hosted double-headers won both their NRLW and NRL matches.

=== Round 8 ===
Home	Score	Away	Match information					
Home	Score	Away	Date and time	Format	Venue	Referees	Attendance	Reports
Canterbury-Bankstown Bulldogs	24–56	Canberra Raiders	Saturday 23 August; 12:45 PM	NRLW (Only)	Belmore Sports Ground	Tori Wilkie	2,535	
Gold Coast Titans	22–4	St. George Illawarra Dragons	Saturday 23 August; 3:15 PM	NRLW; NRL	Cbus Super Stadium	Belinda Sharpe	6,210	
Parramatta Eels	12–56	Sydney Roosters	Saturday 23 August; 5:15 PM	**NRLW**; **NRL**	CommBank Stadium	Dillan Wells	9,128	
Newcastle Knights	16–46	Brisbane Broncos	Sunday 24 August; 11:50 AM	**NRLW**; **NRL**	McDonald Jones Stadium	Kasey Badger	15,935	
New Zealand Warriors	14–22	Cronulla-Sutherland Sharks	Sunday 24 August; 1:45 PM	NRLW (Only)	FMG Stadium Waikato	Paki Parkinson	5,712	
Wests Tigers	8–30	North Queensland Cowboys	Sunday 24 August; 6:15 PM	**NRL**; **NRLW**	Leichhardt Oval	Josh Eaton	2,056	

Notes:
- Attendance at Cbus Super Stadium was NRLW 6,210 and NRL 23,271 (versus New Zealand Warriors).
- Attendance at CommBank Stadium was NRLW 9,128 and NRL 19,741.
- Attendance at McDonald Jones Stadium was NRLW 15,935 and NRL 25,813.
- Attendance at Leichhardt Oval was NRL 16,055 and NRLW 2,056.

=== Round 9 ===
Home	Score	Away	Match information					
Home	Score	Away	Date and time	Format	Venue	Referees	Attendance	Reports
Canberra Raiders	17—16 (GP)	Wests Tigers	Saturday 30 August; 12:45 PM	**NRLW**; **NRL**	GIO Stadium	Dillan Wells	14,464	
St. George Illawarra Dragons	26–18	New Zealand Warriors	Saturday 30 August; 3:15 PM	NRLW; NRL	Netstrata Jubilee Stadium	Rochelle Tamarua	3,180	
North Queensland Cowboys	0–30	Sydney Roosters	Saturday 30 August; 5:15 PM	NRLW; NRL	Queensland Country Bank Stadium	Ziggy Przeklasa-Adamski	8,031	
Cronulla-Sutherland Sharks	19–18 (GP)	Newcastle Knights	Sunday 31 August; 11:50 AM	**NRLW**; **NRL**	Sharks Stadium	Belinda Sharpe	2,757	
Brisbane Broncos	44–0	Canterbury-Bankstown Bulldogs	Sunday 31 August; 1:45 PM	NRLW (Only)	Totally Workwear Stadium	Luke Saldern	1,724	
Gold Coast Titans	26–10	Parramatta Eels	Sunday 31 August; 6:15 PM	NRLW (Only)	Cbus Super Stadium	Mitch Currie	633	

Notes:
- The first match of three on both Saturday and Sunday ended regular time with the scores level. Field goals to win the match in golden point extra time were kicked by Zahara Temara (Canberra Raiders), in her 50th NRLW game, and Chantay Kiria-Ratu (Cronulla Sharks)
- Attendance at GIO Stadium was NRLW 14,464 and NRL 23,746.
- Attendance at Jubilee Stadium was NRLW 3,180 and NRL 9,769 (versus Manly).
- Attendance at Queensland Country Bank Stadium was NRLW 8,301 and NRL 22,903 (versus Brisbane).
- Attendance at Shark Park was NRLW 2,757 and NRL 12,234.
- The Gold Coast Titans' NRLW home game at Robina (6:15pm kikc-off) clashed with their NRL away game in Brisbane (6:00pm finish).

=== Round 10 ===
Home	Score	Away	Match information					
Home	Score	Away	Date and time	Format	Venue	Referees	Attendance	Reports
Sydney Roosters	26–14	Canberra Raiders	Friday 5 September; 5:40 PM	NRLW; NRL	Allianz Stadium	Belinda Sharpe	11,020	
St. George Illawarra Dragons	14–42	North Queensland Cowboys	Saturday 6 September; 12:45 PM	NRLW; NRL	WIN Stadium	Josh Eaton	7.040	
Canterbury-Bankstown Bulldogs	24–14	Cronulla-Sutherland Sharks	Saturday 6 September; 5:15 PM	**NRLW**; **NRL**	Accor Stadium	Rochelle Tamarua	12,174	
New Zealand Warriors	6–26	Brisbane Broncos	Sunday 7 September; 12:00 PM	NRLW (Only)	FMG Stadium Waikato	Paki Parkinson	7,195	
Newcastle Knights	28–22	Gold Coast Titans	Sunday 7 September; 1:45 PM	NRLW (Only)	McDonald Jones Stadium	Dillan Wells	2,047	
Parramatta Eels	38–4	Wests Tigers	Sunday 7 September; 6:15 PM	NRL; NRLW	CommBank Stadium	Mitch Currie	4,847	

Notes:
- Attendance at Allianz Stadium was NRLW 11,020 and NRL 41,604.
- Attendance at WIN Stadium was NRLW 7,040 and NRL 17,442.
- Attendance at Accor Stadium was NRLW 12,174 and NRL 30,368.
- Attendance at CommBank Stadium was NRL 23,359 and NRLW 4,847.
- The Newcastle Knights' NRLW home game at Newcastle (3:30pm finish) clashed with their NRL away game in Parramatta (4:05pm kick-off).

=== Round 11 ===
Home	Score	Away	Match information					
Home	Score	Away	Date and time	Format	Venue	Referees	Attendance	Reports
Sydney Roosters	40–10	Cronulla-Sutherland Sharks	Thursday 11 September; 7:45 PM	NRLW (Only)	Polytec Stadium	Kasey Badger	1,521	
Parramatta Eels	46–14	Canterbury-Bankstown Bulldogs	Friday 12 September; 6:00 PM	NRLW (Only)	CommBank Stadium	Dillan Wells	803	
Brisbane Broncos	50–4	North Queensland Cowboys	Saturday 13 September; 12:00 PM	NRLW (Only)	Totally Workwear Stadium	Belinda Sharpe	1,593	
Gold Coast Titans	17—16 (GP)	Canberra Raiders	Saturday 13 September; 1:45 PM	NRLW (Only)	Cbus Super Stadium	Josh Eaton	1,023	
Wests Tigers	6–44	New Zealand Warriors	Sunday 14 September; 12:00 PM	NRLW (Only)	Campbelltown Sports Ground	Rochelle Tamarua	1,256	
Newcastle Knights	30–22	St. George Illawarra Dragons	Sunday 14 September; 1:45 PM	NRLW (Only)	McDonald Jones Stadium	Luke Saldern	2,477	

== Ladder ==
Pos	Team	Pld	W	D	L	PF	PA	PD	Pts	Qualification
1	Sydney Roosters	11	11	0	0	366	126	+240	22	Advance to second round of finals series (first-round bye)
2	Brisbane Broncos	11	10	0	1	404	116	+288	20	Advance to second round of finals series (first-round bye)
3	Newcastle Knights	11	7	0	4	258	203	+55	14	Advance to finals series
4	North Queensland Cowboys	11	7	0	4	186	176	+10	14	Advance to finals series
5	Cronulla-Sutherland Sharks	11	6	0	5	217	194	+23	12	Advance to finals series
6	Gold Coast Titans	11	5	1	5	171	194	−23	11	Advance to finals series
7	Parramatta Eels	11	5	0	6	202	234	−32	10	
8	New Zealand Warriors	11	4	0	7	194	198	−4	8	
9	Canterbury-Bankstown Bulldogs	11	3	1	7	162	310	−148	7	
10	St. George Illawarra Dragons	11	3	0	8	164	242	−78	6	
11	Canberra Raiders	11	3	0	8	183	325	−142	6	
12	Wests Tigers	11	1	0	10	100	289	−189	2	

Updated to match(es) played on 31 Aug 2025. Source: National Rugby League Women's

== Finals series ==
=== Week 1 ===
The schedule for week one of the finals series was announced shortly before 7:00pm (AEST) on Sunday, 14 September 2025.

Home	Score	Away	Match information					
Home	Score	Away	Date and time	Format	Venue	Referees	Attendance	Reports
Newcastle Knights	34–20	Gold Coast Titans	Saturday 20 September; 2:30 PM	NRLW (Only)	McDonald Jones Stadium	Belinda Sharpe	4,092	
North Queensland Cowboys	18–24	Cronulla-Sutherland Sharks	Saturday 20 September; 4:15 PM	NRLW (Only)	Queensland Country Bank Stadium	Kasey Badger	5,024	

=== Week 2 ===
The schedule for week two of the finals series was announced shortly after 7:00pm (AEST) on Monday, 15 September 2025.

Home	Score	Away	Match information					
Home	Score	Away	Date and time	Format	Venue	Referees	Attendance	Reports
Sydney Roosters	17–16	Cronulla-Sutherland Sharks	Saturday 27 September; 7:45 PM	NRLW (Only)	Polytec Stadium	Belinda Sharpe	3,289	
Brisbane Broncos	30–6	Newcastle Knights	Sunday 28 September; 1:15 PM	NRLW; NRL	Suncorp Stadium	Kasey Badger	21,367	

Notes:
- Attendance at Suncorp Stadium was NRLW 21,367 and NRL 52,492 (versus Panthers).

=== Grand Final ===
Home	Score	Away	Match information					
Home	Score	Away	Date and time	Format	Venue	Referee	Attendance	Reports
Sydney Roosters	18–22	Brisbane Broncos	Sunday, 5 October; 4:00 PM	NRLW; NRL	Accor Stadium	Belinda Sharpe	46,288	

== Weekly awards ==
After each round, the NRL announced via social media two weekly awards. The player with the most fantasy points each round was determined by comparison of Player Stats in the respective match centres.

Round	Most Fantasy Points		Try of the Week		Tackle of the Week	Ref
Round	Player	Points	Try-scorer	Assisting Players	Tackle of the Week	Ref
Sponsor	—		Drinkwise		youi	
1	Indie Bostock	78	Indie Bostock	Teagan Berry	Isabella Waterman	
2	Emma Verran	109	Michaela Brake	Five pass shift. last pass by Tysha Ikenasio	Apii Nicholls	
3	Olivia Kernick	81	Hannah Southwell	Solo run from 42m out, palming off 4 defenders	Essay Banu	
4	Isabelle Kelly	89	Not announced		Martha Mataele	
5	Georgia Hale	84	Ivana Lauitiiti	Received pass from dummy half on 10m line, broke the attempted tackles of three opponents	Shannon Muru	
6	Julia Robinson	105	Tyra Wetere	Cross-field kick by Emily Curtain from left edge to right wing	Caitlin Turnbull	
7	Julia Robinson	115	Brydie Parker	An Amber Hall pass put Jocelyn Kelleher through the line. Parker received the ball 15m out and ran through defenders to score.	Holli Wheeler	
8	Tarryn Aiken	91	Not announced		Tess Staines	
9	Caitlin Turnbull	88	Kerri Johnson	A long cut-out pass by Gayle Broughton	Keele Browne	
10	Teagan Berry	82	Zahara Temara	Chased her own angled grubber kick, touching down just inside the dead ball line	Payton Takimoana	
11	Georgia Hale	83	Teagan Berry	Linebreak and tackle break in solo 90m run	Ivana Lolesio	
FW1	Georgia Hannaway	62	Not announced			
FW2	Julia Robinson	72	Not announced			

== Team of the Year ==
=== Dally M Team of the Year ===
Announced on the evening of 1 October 2025.

Jersey	Position	Player
1	Fullback	Tamika Upton
2	Wing	Payton Takimoana
3	Centre	Julia Robinson
4	Centre	Isabelle Kelly
5	Wing	Sheridan Gallagher
6	Five-eighth	Gayle Broughton
7	Halfback	Jesse Southwell
8	Prop	Ellie Johnston
9	Hooker	Emma Manzelmann
10	Prop	Jessika Elliston
11	Second-row	Romy Teitzel
12	Second-row	Yasmin Clydsdale
13	Lock	Olivia Kernick

=== Players' Dream Team ===
The Rugby League Players Association announced the 2025 Players' Dream team on 24 September 2025.

Jersey	Position	Player
1	Fullback	Tamika Upton
2	Wing	Taina Naividi
3	Centre	Isabelle Kelly
4	Centre	Julia Robinson
5	Wing	Payton Takimoana
6	Five-eighth	Patricia Maliepo
7	Halfback	Tarryn Aiken
8	Prop	Rima Butler
9	Hooker	Emma Manzelmann
10	Prop	Otesa Pule
11	Second-row	Yasmin Clydsdale
12	Second-row	Kezie Apps
13	Lock	Olivia Kernick
14	Impact	Shalom Sauaso

=== David Middleton's Team of the Year ===
Released on the 28th December 2025 in the Rugby League Annual Magazine.

Jersey	Position	Player
1	Fullback	Tamika Upton
2	Wing	Julia Robinson
3	Centre	Tiana Penitani-Gray
4	Centre	Isabelle Kelly
5	Wing	Payton Takimoana
6	Five-eighth	Gayle Broughton
7	Halfback	Jesse Southwell
8	Prop	Rima Butler
9	Hooker	Keeley Davis
10	Prop	Jessika Elliston
11	Second-row	Yasmin Clydsdale
12	Second-row	Alexis Tauaneai
13	Lock	Olivia Kernick

== Individual awards ==
=== Dally M Medal Awards Night ===
Announced on the evening of 1 October 2025.

Dally M Medal Player of the Year:
Tamika Upton ( Brisbane Broncos).

Veronica White Medal:
Rhiannon Byers ( Cronulla-Sutherland Sharks).

Captain of the Year:
Isabelle Kelly ( Sydney Roosters).

Coach of the Year:
John Strange ( Sydney Roosters).

Provan-Summons Medal:
Isabelle Kelly on behalf of the Sydney Roosters

Rookie of the Year:
Shalom Sauaso ( Brisbane Broncos).

Try of the Year:
Indie Bostock ( St George Illawarra Dragons)
vs Canberra Raiders in Round 1.

Tackle of the Year:
Ivana Lauitiiti ( New Zealand Warriors)
vs Wests Tigers in Round 11.

=== Statistical awards ===
Highest Point Scorer in Regular-season: Romy Teitzel ( Brisbane Broncos) 106 (4t 45g)
Top Try Scorer in Regular-season: Tamika Upton ( Brisbane Broncos) 18

Highest Point Scorer in full season: Romy Teitzel ( Brisbane Broncos) 116 (4t 50g)
Top Try Scorer in full season: Tamika Upton ( Brisbane Broncos) 20

=== RLPA Players' Champion Awards ===
The following awards were voted for by NRLW players and announced at the end of the season.

The Players' Champion:
Tamika Upton ( Brisbane Broncos)

Rookie of the Year:
Shalom Sauaso ( Brisbane Broncos)

Players' Recruit of the Year:
Tamika Upton ( Brisbane Broncos)

The following award, selected from three nominees, was announced at the end of the season.
Dennis Tutty Award:
Madison Bartlett ( Canberra Raiders)

The Rugby League Players Association announced monthly awards during the season. A panel of three former players selected five players for each month. All current players were eligible to vote for the monthly awards.

- July: Isabelle Kelly ( Sydney Roosters)
- August: Tamika Upton ( Brisbane Broncos)

=== Club awards ===
Club	Player of the Year	Player's Player	Members' Award	Coach's Award	Rookie / Emerging Talent	Community	Ref
Brisbane Broncos	Tamika Upton	Tamika Upton	—	—	Shalom Sauaso	—	
Canberra Raiders	Simaima Taufa	—	—	Jordyn Preston	Elise Simpson	—	
Canterbury-Bankstown Bulldogs	Andie Robinson	Ashleigh Quinlan	Tayla Preston	Angelina Teakaraanga-Katoa	Moana Courtenay	—	
Cronulla-Sutherland Sharks	Emma Verran	Manilita Takapautolo	Emma Verran	—	Stephanie Faulkner	Rhiannon Byers	
Gold Coast Titans	Jessika Elliston	Jessika Elliston	Lily-Rose Kolc	—	Ivana Lolesio	—	
Newcastle Knights	Yasmin Clydsdale	Jesse Southwell	—	—	Sienna Yeo & Jules Kirkpatrick	Kayla Romaniuk	
New Zealand Warriors	Apii Nicholls	Kaiyah Atai	Payton Takimoana	—	Ivana Lauitiiti	—	
North Queensland Cowboys	Bree Chester	Fran Goldthorp	Emma Manzelmann	Abigail Roache	Ana Malupo	—	
Parramatta Eels	Abbi Church	Martha Mataele	Abbi Church	Chloe Jackson	Martha Mataele	Elsie Albert	
St. George Illawarra Dragons	Madi Mulhall	—	Teagan Berry	Keele Browne	Trinity Tauaneai	Keele Browne	
Sydney Roosters	Olivia Kernick	Taina Naividi	Isabelle Kelly	—	Macie Carlile	Olivia Kernick	
Wests Tigers	Sarah Togatuki	Caitlin Turnbull	—	—	Caitlin Turnbull	—	

As clubs each define their own award categories there are awards that do not fit into the above categories:

- Brisbane Broncos
  - Most Consistent: Julia Robinson
  - Best Back: Tamika Upton
  - Best Forward: Keilee Joseph
  - Play of the Year: Tamika Upton for her four-try haul in Round 9 against the Bulldogs
- Canberra Raiders
  - Junior Representative Player of the Year: Uta Uatisone Poka
- Cronulla-Sutherland Sharks
  - NRLW Wellbeing and Education Excellence: Quincy Dodd
  - Harvey Norman Women’s Premiership Player of the Year: Monique Donovan
  - Harvey Norman Women’s Premiership Players Player: Koffi Brookfield
  - Harvey Norman Women’s Premiership Wellbeing and Education Excellence: Koffi Brookfield
- Gold Coast Titans
  - Wellbeing & Education Award: Georgia Grey
  - Effort Player of the Year: Shaylee Bent
- Newcastle Knights
  - Gladiator of the Year: Sheridan Gallagher
  - Harvey Norman Women’s Premiership Player of the Year: Carissa Reid
  - Harvey Norman Women’s Premiership Players’ Player: Sophie Buller
- New Zealand Warriors
  - Clubwoman of the Year: Tysha Ikenasio
- North Queensland Cowboys
  - Townsville Bulletin Fan Choice Award: Emma Manzelmann
  - NRLW Cowboys Way Award: Abigail Roache
- Parramatta Eels
  - Harvey Norman Women’s Premiership Coaches Award: Josie Lenaz
  - Harvey Norman Women’s Premiership Players’ Player Award: Ella Carlisle
  - Harvey Norman Women’s Premiership Player of the Year: Jessica Kennedy
- Sydney Roosters
  - Try of the Year: Isabelle Kelly in Round 4 against the Bulldogs
  - Harvey Norman Women’s Premiership Best & Fairest: Nikiah Campbell
  - Harvey Norman Women’s Premiership Player's Player: Nikiah Campbell
  - Harvey Norman Women’s Premiership Best Back: Jayde Herdegen
  - Harvey Norman Women’s Premiership Best Forward: Imogen Hei
- Wests Tigers
  - Harvey Norman Women’s Premiership Player of the Year: Taylor Mapusua
  - Harvey Norman Women’s Premiership Players’ Player Award: Katalina Vave

=== Middo's Top 5 Players of 2025 ===
Rugby League historian and statician David Middleton nominated his top five players for the 2025 NRLW season.

Player	Club
Abbi Church	Parramatta Eels
Olivia Kernick	Sydney Roosters
Julia Robinson	Brisbane Broncos
Jesse Southwell	Newcastle Knights
Tamika Upton	Brisbane Broncos

== Players and transfers ==
The 2025 season salary cap for clubs is $1,254,000 and the minimum wage for contracted players is $41,800. Squad size is 24 players plus 4 development players. The first transfer signing for the 2025 season was announced on 2 May 2024. In the recent seasons of 2023 and 2024, Clubs were required to fill their 24-player roster by late May.
Players may be added to each club’s roster from outside the initial squad of 24 as injury replacements. This can be to cover season-ending injuries or a significant number of short-term injuries.

=== Transfers ===
Table last updated: 2 July 2025

2025 NRLW Transfers
Player	2024 Club	2025 Club	Announcement Date	Reference
Caitlan Johnston-Green	Newcastle Knights	Cronulla-Sutherland Sharks	2 May 2024	
Tayla Preston	Cronulla-Sutherland Sharks	Canterbury-Bankstown Bulldogs	19 Jul 2024	
Ashleigh Quinlan	Canberra Raiders	Canterbury-Bankstown Bulldogs	19 Jul 2024	
Ebony Prior	Wests Tigers	Canterbury-Bankstown Bulldogs	20 Jul 2024	
Andie Robinson	Cronulla-Sutherland Sharks	Canterbury-Bankstown Bulldogs	24 Jul 2024	
Tegan Dymock	Cronulla-Sutherland Sharks	Canterbury-Bankstown Bulldogs	2 Sep 2024	
Kalosipani Hopoate	Sydney Roosters	Canterbury-Bankstown Bulldogs	2 Sep 2024	
Alexis Tauaneai	St George Illawarra Dragons	Canterbury-Bankstown Bulldogs	2 Sep 2024	
Angelina Teakaraanga-Katoa	St George Illawarra Dragons	Canterbury-Bankstown Bulldogs	2 Sep 2024	
Holli Wheeler	Cronulla-Sutherland Sharks	Canterbury-Bankstown Bulldogs	2 Sep 2024	
Apii Nicholls	Canberra Raiders	New Zealand Warriors	10 Sep 2024	
Harata Butler	North Queensland Cowboys	New Zealand Warriors	12 Sep 2024	
Mya Hill-Moana	Sydney Roosters	New Zealand Warriors	12 Sep 2024	
Capri Paekau	Taniwharau	New Zealand Warriors	12 Sep 2024	
Laishon Albert-Jones	Newcastle Knights	New Zealand Warriors	16 Sep 2024	
Matekino Gray	Gold Coast Titans	New Zealand Warriors	18 Sep 2024	
Emmanita Paki	Central Qld Capras (BMD)	New Zealand Warriors	18 Sep 2024	
Lavinia Tauhalaliku	North Queensland Cowboys	New Zealand Warriors	18 Sep 2024	
Elizabeth MacGregor	Sydney Roosters (U19)	Canterbury-Bankstown Bulldogs	19 Sep 2024	
Hope Millard	Illawarra Steelers (U19 & HNWP)	Canterbury-Bankstown Bulldogs	19 Sep 2024	
Shakira Baker	Hurricanes Poua (Union 2024 & 2025)	New Zealand Warriors	20 Sep 2024	
Tyra Wetere	Rangataua (Bay of Plenty (Union))	New Zealand Warriors	20 Sep 2024	
Metanoia Fotu-Moala	Otara Scorpions	New Zealand Warriors	25 Sep 2024	
Bridget Hoy	Brisbane Broncos	Canterbury-Bankstown Bulldogs	26 Sep 2024	
Rima Butler	Newcastle Knights	Sydney Roosters	15 Oct 2024	
Tiana Davison	Sydney Roosters	Newcastle Knights	23 Oct 2024	
Maatuleio Fotu-Moala	St George Illawarra Dragons	Canterbury-Bankstown Bulldogs	12 Nov 2024	
Anneka Wilson	Wentworthville (HNWP)	Canterbury-Bankstown Bulldogs	26 Nov 2024	
Leilani Wilson	Wentworthville (HNWP)	Canterbury-Bankstown Bulldogs	26 Nov 2024	
Paige Travis	St Helens	Parramatta Eels	28 Nov 2024	
Tamika Upton	Newcastle Knights	Brisbane Broncos	5 Dec 2024	
Martha Mataele	Western Force (Union 2023)	Parramatta Eels	6 Dec 2024	
Botille Vette-Welsh	Wests Tigers	Newcastle Knights	9 Dec 2024	
Michaela Blyde	New Zealand Rugby Sevens (Union)	New Zealand Warriors	17 Dec 2024	
Leianne Tufuga	Wests Tigers	Canberra Raiders	17 Dec 2024	
Tara McGrath-West	St George Illawarra Dragons (Didn't play in 2024 due to injury)	Brisbane Broncos	18 Dec 2024	
Najvada George	Wests Tigers	North Queensland Cowboys	18 Dec 2024	
Abigail Roache	Newcastle Knights	North Queensland Cowboys	18 Dec 2024	
Moana Courtenay	North Harbour (Union)	Canterbury-Bankstown Bulldogs	18 Dec 2024	
Makayla Eli	Manly Sea Eagles (HNWP)	New Zealand Warriors	19 Dec 2024	
Tysha Ikenasio	New Zealand Rugby Sevens (Union)	New Zealand Warriors	19 Dec 2024	
Payton Takimoana	Bay of Plenty (Union)	New Zealand Warriors	19 Dec 2024	
Kalyn Takitimu-Cook	Hurricanes Poua (Union)	New Zealand Warriors	19 Dec 2024	
Chloe Saunders	Cronulla-Sutherland Sharks	Canberra Raiders	19 Dec 2025	
Jasmine Fogavini	Brisbane Broncos	Gold Coast Titans	20 Dec 2024	
Kaiyah Atai	Richmond Roses (Auckland RL)	New Zealand Warriors	20 Dec 2024	
Emily Curtain	Wests Tigers	New Zealand Warriors	20 Dec 2024	
Felila Kia	Newcastle Knights	New Zealand Warriors	20 Dec 2024	
Lavinia Kitai	Cronulla Sharks (HNWP)	New Zealand Warriors	20 Dec 2024	
Maarire Puketapu	Sunshine Coast Falcons (BMD)	New Zealand Warriors	20 Dec 2024	
Lydia Turua-Quedley	Richmond Roses (Auckland RL)	New Zealand Warriors	20 Dec 2024	
Lily Dick	Rugby Sevens	North Queensland Cowboys	20 Dec 2024	
Pauline Piliae-Rasabale	Wests Tigers	Gold Coast Titans	22 Jan 2025	
Georgia Thomas	St George Dragons (HNWP)	Canberra Raiders	31 Jan 2025	
Rosie Kelly	Parramatta Eels	North Queensland Cowboys	7 Feb 2025	
Hailee-Jay Ormond-Maunsell	Gold Coast Titans	North Queensland Cowboys	7 Feb 2025	
Jacinta Carter	Newcastle Knights	Cronulla-Sutherland Sharks	17 Feb 2025	
Shaniah Power	North Queensland Cowboys	Wigan Warriors	19 Feb 2025	
Chantay Kiria-Ratu	Gold Coast Titans	Cronulla-Sutherland Sharks	21 Feb 2025	
Tyla King	St George Illawarra Dragons	Cronulla-Sutherland Sharks	4 Mar 2025	
Grace Hamilton	Melbourne Rebels (Union 2024)	St George Illawarra Dragons	4 Mar 2025	
Ahlivia Ingram	Cronulla Sharks (HNWP)	St George Illawarra Dragons	4 Mar 2025	
Jayme Millard	Cronulla Sharks (HNWP)	St George Illawarra Dragons	4 Mar 2025	
Hannah Southwell	Newcastle Knights	St George Illawarra Dragons	4 Mar 2025	
Pia Tapsell	Cronulla-Sutherland Sharks	St George Illawarra Dragons	4 Mar 2025	
Jetaya Faifua	North Queensland Cowboys	Wests Tigers	14 Mar 2025	
Jade Fonua	Parramatta Eels	Wests Tigers	14 Mar 2025	
Macie Carlile	Canterbury Bulldogs (HNWP)	Sydney Roosters	18 Mar 2025	
Faythe Manera	Queensland Reds (Union 2025)	Wests Tigers	21 Mar 2025	
Lily Rogan	Illawarra Steelers (HNWP)	Wests Tigers	21 Mar 2025	
Caitlin Turnbull	Wentworthville Magpies (HNWP)	Wests Tigers	21 Mar 2025	
Fleur Ginn	Queensland Reds (Union Sevens)	Parramatta Eels	26 Mar 2025	
Jordyn Preston	St George Illawarra Dragons	Canberra Raiders	14 Apr 2025	
Patricia Maliepo	Auckland Blues (Union 2025)	New Zealand Warriors	16 Apr 2025	
Nita Maynard	Newcastle Knights	St George Illawarra Dragons	8 May 2025	
Avery-Rose Carmont	Otahuhu Leopards (Auckland RL)	New Zealand Warriors	8 May 2025	
Emily Bass	Gold Coast Titans	Wests Tigers	9 May 2025	
Pihuka Berryman-Duff	Parramatta Eels	Wests Tigers	9 May 2025	
Kerri Johnson	Auckland Blues (Union 2025)	Brisbane Broncos	9 May 2025	
Azalleyah Maaka	Chiefs Manawa (Union 2025)	Brisbane Broncos	9 May 2025	
Adi Vani Buleki	Western Force	Canterbury-Bankstown Bulldogs	12 May 2025	
Monica Tagoai	Hurricanes Poua (Union 2025)	Canterbury-Bankstown Bulldogs	12 May 2025	
Keighley Simpson	Matatū (Union 2025)	Newcastle Knights	12 May 2025	
Tess Staines	Wests Tigers	Newcastle Knights	12 May 2025	
Sienna Yeo	Illawarra Steelers (HNWP)	Newcastle Knights	12 May 2025	
Tafao Asaua	Parramatta Eels	North Queensland Cowboys	12 May 2025	
Isabella Waterman	Newcastle Knights	Canberra Raiders	13 May 2025	
Megan Pakulis	York Valkyrie	Gold Coast Titans	13 May 2025	
Jayde Herdegen	Newcastle Knights (HNWP)	Sydney Roosters	13 May 2025	
Jayda Lofipo	Wynnum-Manly Seagulls (BMD)	Gold Coast Titans	18 May 2025	
Terina Te Tamaki	New Zealand Rugby Sevens (Union)	Wests Tigers	2 Jun 2025	
Jessikah Reeves	Western Clydesdales (BMD)	Wests Tigers	6 Jun 2025	
Natasha Penitani	Wests Tigers	Gold Coast Titans	7 Jun 2025	
Lili Boyle	Manly Sea Eagles (HNWP)	Canberra Raiders	1 Jul 2025	
Kayla Jackson	Sydney Roosters (Development)	Gold Coast Titans	1 Jul 2025	
Ashlee Matapo	Auckland Storm (Union 2024)	New Zealand Warriors	1 Jul 2025	

=== Promotions ===
The following players have been promoted from a development contract or their NRLW club's pathway teams.
Table last updated: 29 March 2025.

2025 NRLW promoted players
Player	Pathway teams	2025 NRLW club	Announcement date	Reference
Leah Ollerton	2024 Newcastle Knights (Development); 2024 Newcastle Knights (Open)	Newcastle Knights	8 Dec 2023	
Tyra Le Ekepati	2024 Sydney Roosters (Development); 2024 Indigenous Academy (U19); 2024 Central Coast Roosters (Open)	Sydney Roosters	18 Dec 2023	
Trinity Tauaneai	2024 St George Illawarra Dragons (Development); 2024 Illawarra Steelers (Open)	St George Illawarra Dragons	20 Feb 2024	
Indie Bostock	2024 St George Illawarra Dragons (Development); 2024 Illawarra Steelers (U19 & Open)	St George Illawarra Dragons	9 May 2024	
Leilani Ahsam	2024 Newcastle Knights (Development); 2024 Tweed Seagulls (U19); 2024 Newcastle Knights (Open)	Newcastle Knights	24 May 2024	
Fane Finau	2024 Newcastle Knights (Development); 2024 Newcastle Knights (U19 & Open)	Newcastle Knights	19 Jul 2024	
Iemaima Etuale	2024 Wests Tigers (Development); 2024 Wests Tigers (U19 & Open)	Wests Tigers	25 Jul 2024	
Latisha Smythe	2024 Canterbury Bulldogs (Open)	Canterbury-Bankstown Bulldogs	9 Sep 2024	
Sarahcen Oliver	2024 Canterbury Bulldogs (Open)	Canterbury-Bankstown Bulldogs	17 Sep 2024	
Shannon Muru	2024 Canterbury Bulldogs (Open)	Canterbury-Bankstown Bulldogs	30 Sep 2024	
Paea Uilou	2024 Canterbury Bulldogs (U19 & Open)	Canterbury-Bankstown Bulldogs	30 Sep 2024	
Shaniece Monschau	2024 Canterbury Bulldogs (Open)	Canterbury-Bankstown Bulldogs	7 Nov 2024	
Shaquaylah Mahakitau-Monschau	2024 Canterbury Bulldogs (U19 & Open)	Canterbury-Bankstown Bulldogs	7 Nov 2024	
Reegan Hicks	2024 Redcliffe Dolphins (U19); 2024 Norths Devils (Open); 2025 Redcliffe Dolphins (U19)	Brisbane Broncos	20 Dec 2024	
Montaya Hudson	2024 Norths Devils (Open)	Brisbane Broncos	20 Dec 2024	
Shalom Sauaso	2024 Queensland Reds (Union); 2024 Brisbane Broncos (Development)	Brisbane Broncos	20 Dec 2024	
Elise Simpson	2024 Canberra Raiders (U19)	Canberra Raiders	27 Mar 2025	
Tori Shipton	2024 Illawarra Steelers (U17 & Open)	St George Illawarra Dragons	8 Aug 2025	
Tahlia O'Brien	2024 Illawarra Steelers (U17)	St George Illawarra Dragons	8 Aug 2025	
