= Tayla Preston =

Wales women's international rugby league player

Personal information
- Born: Tayla Preston; 27 September 1999 (age 27) Sydney, Australia
- Height: 172 cm (5 ft 8 in)
- Weight: 71 kg (11 st 3 lb)

Playing information
- Position: Halfback
Club
Years	Team	Pld	T	G	FG	P
2022	Parramatta Eels	6	1	15	0	34
2023–24	Cronulla-Sutherland Sharks	20	1	47	0	98
2025–26	Canterbury-Bankstown Bulldogs	22	1	38	0	80
	Total	48	3	100	0	212
Representative
Years	Team	Pld	T	G	FG	P
2026	Prime Minister's XIII	1	1	0	0	4
2026	Wales	3	0	2	0	4
- Source: RLP As of 14 November 2026

Tayla Preston (born 27 September 1999) is an Australian born Welsh women's international rugby league player who plays at halfback for the Canterbury-Bankstown Bulldogs in the NRLW. She previously played for the Parramatta Eels and the Cronulla-Sutherland Sharks.

== Career ==
=== Parramatta Eels ===
She made her NRLW debut in round 2 of the 2022 NRL Women's season for the Eels against the St. George Illawarra Dragons.

=== Representative ===
She played in the Prime Minister's XIII 66–6 win over PNG Prime Minister's XIII, scoring a try, on 3 October 2026.

She made her international debut for Wales in round 1 of the 2026 Women's Rugby League World Cup vs England in a 70–6 loss.
