= Brayden Wiliame =

Fiji international rugby league footballer

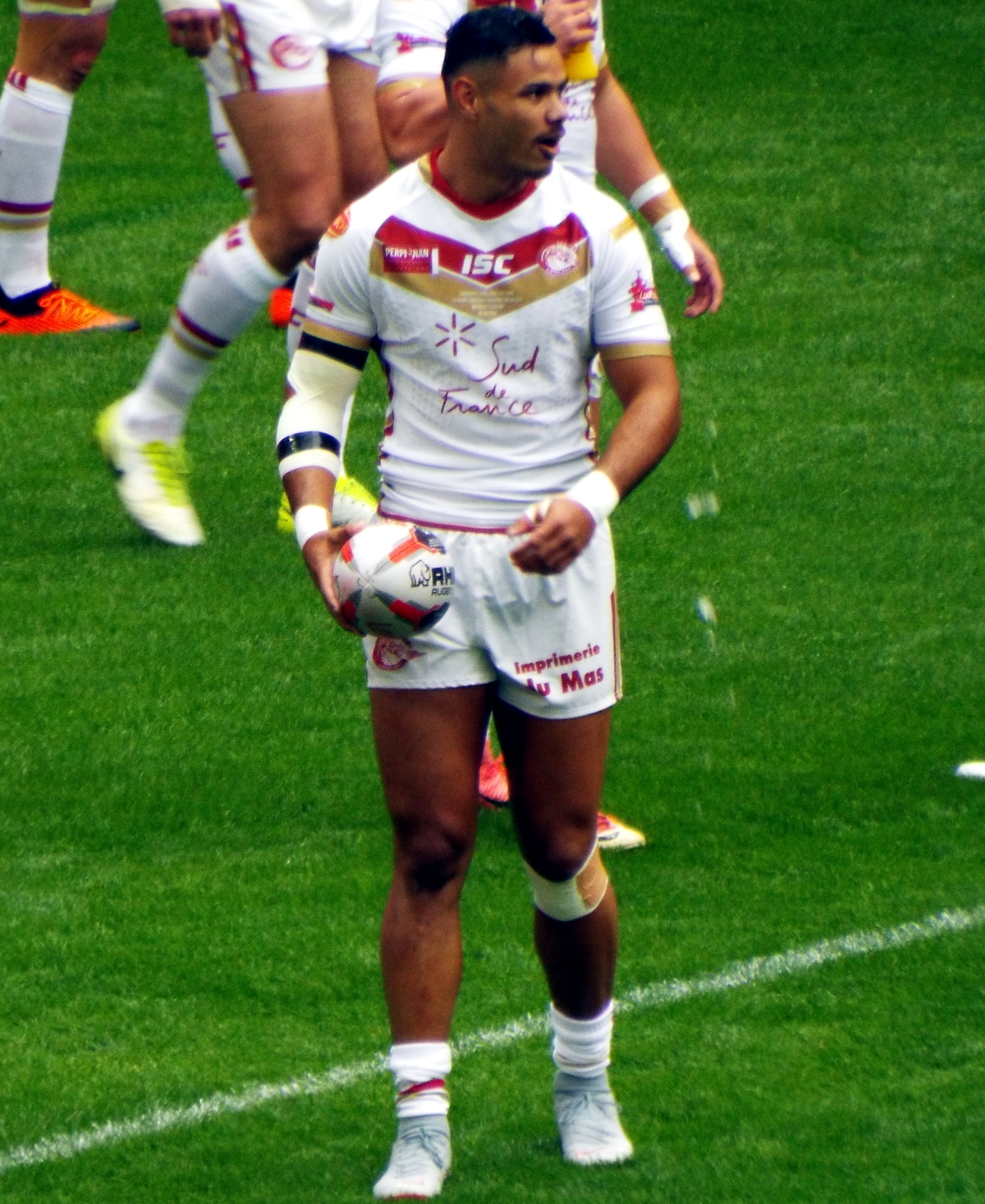

Personal information
- Full name: Brayden Joji Wiliame
- Born: 17 December 1992 (age 33) Gosford, New South Wales, Australia
- Height: 188 cm (6 ft 2 in)
- Weight: 97 kg (15 st 4 lb)

Playing information

Rugby league
- Position: Centre, Wing, Second-row
Club
Years	Team	Pld	T	G	FG	P
2013	Parramatta Eels	6	3	0	0	12
2015–16	Manly Sea Eagles	23	7	0	0	28
2017–19	Catalans Dragons	77	35	0	0	140
2020–21	St. George Illawarra	17	6	0	0	24
2023	New Zealand Warriors	2	0	0	0	0
	Total	125	51	0	0	204
Representative
Years	Team	Pld	T	G	FG	P
2015–19	Fiji	9	4	0	0	16
2019	Fiji 9s	3	0	0	0	0

Rugby union
Club
Years	Team	Pld	T	G	FG	P
2022	USA Perpignan	2	4	0	0	0

Coaching information
Club
Years	Team	Gms	W	D	L	W%
2025–	Canterbury Bulldogs Women	11	3	1	7	27
- Source: As of 1 May 2026

Brayden Wiliame (born 17 December 1992) is a former rugby league footballer who last played as a centre, winger and second-row forward for New Zealand Warriors in the National Rugby League (NRL).

He has previously played for the Parramatta Eels, Manly Warringah Sea Eagles and St George Illawarra Dragons in the (NRL), and the Catalans Dragons in the Super League.

Wiliame is currently the coach of the Canterbury-Bankstown Bulldogs Women's NRLW squad.

== Background ==
Wiliame was born in Gosford, New South Wales, Australia and is of Fijian descent.

He played his junior football for the Woy Woy Roosters, Umina Bunnies and Central Coast Harold Matthews Cup and S. G. Ball Cup squads, before signing a 3-year contract with the Melbourne Storm.

== Playing career ==
=== 2010-2012 ===
From 2010 to 2012, Wiliame played for the Melbourne Storm's NYC team.

In June 2010, Wiliame played for the New South Wales Under-18s team.

In October 2010, Wiliame played for the junior Fiji team.

=== 2013 ===
In 2013, Wiliame joined the Parramatta Eels. In round 13 of the 2013 NRL season, Wiliame made his NRL debut for the Parramatta Eels against the Sydney Roosters. He played six games for Parramatta in the 2013 NRL season as the club finished last on the table for a second consecutive year. At the end of 2013, Wiliame was released by the Parramatta Eels and joined the Newcastle Knights for the 2014 NRL season.

=== 2014 ===
On 1 October 2014, Wiliame signed a two-year contract with the Manly Warringah Sea Eagles starting in 2015.

=== 2015 ===
He made his debut for the Manly Warringah Sea Eagles in round 3 of the 2015 NRL season against the Canterbury-Bankstown Bulldogs.

=== 2016 ===
After playing on the wing in the opening two rounds of the 2016 NRL season, Wiliame was demoted to the Manly Warringah Sea Eagles' New South Wales Cup team to allow for the return from injury of fullback Brett Stewart. He was recalled to the side for the Manly-Warringah Sea Eagles' Anzac Day match against the Newcastle Knights in Newcastle following a broken collar bone suffered by winger Jorge Taufua a week earlier against Parramatta. Wiliame crossed for his first NRL try of the season. Manly-Warringah Sea Eagles ran out 26-10 winners over the bottom placed Newcastle.

After 23 first grade games with Manly Warringah Sea Eagles, Wiliame was granted a release from his contract with the club on 9 November 2016 in order to take up a two-year deal with the Catalans Dragons in the Super League.

=== 2018 ===
He played in the 2018 Challenge Cup Final victory over the Warrington Wolves at Wembley Stadium.

=== 2019 ===
On 17 December 2019, Wiliame signed a two-year deal to join St. George Illawarra starting in the 2020 NRL season.

=== 2020-2021 ===
On 16 September 2021, it was announced that Williame had been released by St. George Illawarra.

=== 2022 ===
On 11 November, Wiliame signed a two-year deal to join the New Zealand Warriors starting in 2023.

=== 2023 ===
Wiliame was limited to only two matches for the New Zealand Warriors in the 2023 NRL season as the club finished 4th on the table and qualified for the finals.

On 11 Oct 2023 he announced his retirement from professional rugby league.

== Coaching career ==
On 7 April 2025, the Canterbury-Bankstown Bulldogs announced that Wiliame had signed a two year deal and would coach their NRLW squad. Wiliame previously worked with the New Zealand Warriors Pathways team.

== International career ==
On 2 May 2015, Wiliame played for Fiji against Papua New Guinea in the 2015 Melanesian Cup.

On 7 May 2016, Wiliame played for Fiji against Papua New Guinea in the 2016 Melanesian Cup.
