= Canterbury-Bankstown Bulldogs Women =

Australian professional rugby league club, based in Belmore, NSW

Canterbury-Bankstown Bulldogs
Club information
- Full name: Canterbury-Bankstown Bulldogs Rugby League Club
- Nickname(s): Dogs, Doggies, The Family Club
- Colours: Blue; White
- Founded: Team: 28 Mar 2024; 2 years ago Club: 1935; 91 years ago
- Website: bulldogs.com.au

Current details
- Grounds: Stadium Australia (84,000); Belmore Sports Ground (19,000)
- CEO: Aaron Warburton
- Chairman: Adam Driussi
- Coach: Mark O'Meley (from 2027)
- Manager: Phil Gould
- Captain: Tayla Preston (incumbent)
- Competition: NRL Women's Premiership
- Current season

Uniforms
Home colours	Away colours

Records
- First game: Bulldogs 26 – 12 Knights; Accor Stadium (4 Jul 2025)
- Biggest win: Bulldogs 28 – 8 Dragons; Accor Stadium (25 Jul 2026)
- Biggest loss: Bulldogs 0 – 44 Broncos; Totally Workwear Stadium (31 Aug 2025)
- Most recent game: Bulldogs 12 – 42 Roosters; Allianz Stadium (10 Sep 2026)
- Most capped: 22 – Tayla Preston; Andie Robinson
- Highest try scorer: 12 – Monica Tagoai
- Highest points scorer: 80 – Tayla Preston

The Canterbury-Bankstown Bulldogs Women are an Australian professional rugby league club based in Belmore, a suburb in the Canterbury-Bankstown region of Sydney. They entered the National Rugby League Women's Premiership competition in mid-2025. Currently, the club fields women’s teams in the pathway competitions facilitated by the New South Wales Rugby League, including the open-age Harvey Norman Women's Premiership, Under 19 Tarsha Gale Cup, and Under 17 Lisa Fiaola Cup.

== Seasons ==
Season	Regular season								Finals		Ref
Season	P	W	D	L	F	A	Pts	Pos	Top	Placing	Ref
2025	11	3	1	7	162	310	7	9th	6	—	
2026	11	3	0	8	174	374	6	TBA	6	—	

=== 2026 draw ===
The draw for the 2026 season was announced on 14 November 2025.

Round	Opponent	Score	Date	Time	Venue	
1	Warriors	10–32	Sun 5 Jul 2026	1:45 PM	Away	FMG Stadium Waikato
2	Titans	10–36	Sat 11 Jul 2026	3:15 PM	Home	Accor Stadium
3	Sharks	24–18	Sat 18 Jul 2026	5:15 PM	Home	Accor Stadium
4	Dragons	28–8	Sat 25 Jul 2026	3:15 PM	Home	Accor Stadium
5	Broncos	4–34	Sun 2 Aug 2026	12:00 PM	Neutral	Geohex Stadium, Wagga Wagga
6	Cowboys	28–26	Sat 8 Aug 2026	12:45 PM	Home	Belmore Sports Ground
7	Eels	18–30	Sat 15 Aug 2026	3:15 PM	Away	CommBank Stadium
8	Raiders	4–48	Sat 22 Aug 2026	3:15 PM	Home	Belmore Sports Ground
9	Tigers	14–44	Sun 30 Aug 2026	6:15 PM	Away	Campbelltown Sports Ground
10	Knights	22–56	Sat 5 Sep 2026	5:15 PM	Away	McDonald Jones Stadium
11	Roosters	12–42	Thu 10 Sep 2026	7:45 PM	Away	Allianz Stadium

== Head-to-head records ==
Opponent	First meeting	P	W	D	L	PF	PA	Win %	Share
Knights	4 Jul 2025	2	1	0	1	48	68	50.00%	41.38%
Tigers	10 Jul 2025	2	1	0	1	26	52	50.00%	33.33%
Dragons	19 Jul 2025	2	1	0	1	42	26	50.00%	61.76%
Roosters	26 Jul 2025	2	0	0	2	34	84	0.00%	28.81%
Titans	2 Aug 2025	2	0	1	1	24	50	25.00%	32.43%
Warriors	9 Aug 2025	2	0	0	2	16	66	0.00%	19.51%
Cowboys	17 Aug 2025	2	1	0	1	34	48	50.00%	41.46%
Raiders	23 Aug 2025	2	0	0	2	28	104	0.00%	21.21%
Broncos	31 Aug 2025	2	0	0	2	4	78	0.00%	4.88%
Sharks	6 Sep 2025	2	2	0	0	48	32	100.00%	60.00%
Eels	12 Sep 2025	2	0	0	2	32	76	0.00%	29.63%
Totals	4 Jul 2025	22	6	1	15	336	684	29.55%	32.94%

Notes

- Share % is the percentage of points For over the sum of points For and Against.
- Clubs listed in the order than the Bulldogs Women first played them.
- As of 11 September 2026

== Coach ==
The inaugural coach of the Canterbury Bulldogs Women's team will coach a second successive season in 2026.
As of 11 September 2026

Coach	Season span	M	W	D	L	For	Agst	Win %	Share %	Ref
Brayden Wiliame	2025—2026	22	6	1	15	336	684	29.55%	32.94%	
Mark O'Meley	2027—	Appointed for 2027 season								

== Captains ==
All players who have captained the Canterbury-Bankstown Bulldogs women's team in NRLW matches.
As of 11 September 2026

C#	Name	Years as Captain	Debut		Games as Captain			Games for Club	Ref
C#	Name	Years as Captain	Date	Round	Solo	Joint	Total	Games for Club	Ref
1	Angelina Teakaraanga-Katoa	2025–2026	4 Jul 2025	1	0	21	21	21	
1	Tayla Preston	2025–present	4 Jul 2025	1	1	21	22	22	

== Players ==
Jersey numbers in the table reflect the team list announced for Round 11.
Table last updated on 11 September 2026.

J#	Player	Age	Position(s)	NRLW seasons				NRLW stats					Origin	Tests	All Stars
J#	Player	Age	Position(s)	Debut	2018-24	2025	2026	M	T	G	Pts	Prems	Origin	Tests	All Stars
1	Shanthie Lui	18	Fullback	2026	—	—	1	1	0	0	0	—	—	—	—
2	Simina Lokotui	20	Wing, Centre	2025	—	7	10	17	10	0	40	—	—	2	—
3	Daynah Nankivell	25	Centre, Wing	2026	—	RU	10	10	1	0	4	—	—	—	—
4	Monica Tagoai	27	Centre	2025	—	8	10	18	12	0	48	—	—	—	—
5	Elizabeth MacGregor	19	Wing, Fullback	2025	—	8	9	17	10	0	40	—	—	—	—
6	Andie Robinson	24	Five-eighth, Fullback	2022	5 6	11	11	33	8	0	32	—	—	—	—
7	Tayla Preston	26	Halfback, Five-eighth	2022	6 20	11	11	48	3	100	212	—	—	—	—
8	Kalosipani Hopoate	22	Prop	2022	24	10	9	43	3	0	12	1	—	4	—
9	Mary-Jane Taito	18	Hooker	2026	—	U	11	11	0	0	0	—	—	—	—
10	Alexis Tauaneai	21	Prop, Lock	2023	16	8	11	35	8	0	32	—	—	6	—
11	Leilani Wilson	23	Second-row, Prop	2026	—	R	11	11	0	0	0	—	—	—	—
12	Pauline Suli-Ruka	20	Second-row, Centre	2025	—	5	4	9	0	0	0	—	—	2	1
13	Angelina Teakaraanga-Katoa	24	Lock, Second-row	2022	1 18	10	11	40	2	0	8	—	—	9	—
14	Evelyn Roberts	18	Five-eighth, Hooker	2026	—	R	9	9	2	0	8	—	—	—	—
15	Latisha Smythe	22	Second-row, Lock	2025	—	7	9	16	0	0	0	—	—	4	—
16	Hope Millard	21	Lock, Prop	2025	—	6	11	17	2	0	8	—	—	—	—
17	Ma’atuleio Fotu-Moala	27	Wing, Centre	2024	6	4	5	15	5	0	20	—	—	—	—
18	Bridget Hoy	27	Wing, Fullback	2024	1	4	3	8	1	0	4	—	—	—	—
19	Moana Courtenay	26	Centre, Wing	2025	—	10	2	12	3	0	12	—	—	2	—
20	Waimarie Martin	21	Hooker	—	—	R	—	0	0	0	0	—	—	—	—
21	Giovanna Suani	18	Prop	2026	—	—	5	5	0	0	0	—	—	—	—
22	Paea Uilou	20	Prop	2025	—	4	4	8	0	0	0	—	—	2	—
–	Tamika Jones	23	Second-row	2026	—	RU	8	8	1	0	4	—	—	—	—
–	Shaquaylah Mahakitau-Monschau	20	Five-eighth, Hooker	2025	—	3	1	4	0	0	0	—	—	—	—
–	Evah McEwen	20	Second-row, Centre	2024	2	9	—	11	4	0	16	—	—	3	1
–	Leteena Medland	18	Prop	—	—	—	—	0	0	0	0	—	—	—	—
–	Ambryn Murphy-Haua	—	Five-eighth, Halfback	—	—	R	—	0	0	0	0	—	—	—	—
–	Ebony Prior	24	Hooker	2023	13	11	2	26	3	0	12	—	—	—	—
–	Ashleigh Quinlan	31	Five-eighth, Halfback	2022	6 17	10	9	42	7	0	28	—	—	8	4
DV	Aliahana Fuimaono	18	Second-row	—	—	R	—	0	0	0	0	—	—	—	—
DV	Milahn Ieremia	19	Wing	—	—	—	—	0	0	0	0	—	—	—	—
DV	Olivia Va'alele	18	Halfback	—	—	R	—	0	0	0	0	—	—	—	—
–	Anneka Wilson	23	Hooker, Halfback	2025	—	9	—	9	0	0	0	—	—	—	—

Notes

- Giovanna Suani and Leilani Wilson were each signed on a supplementary contact for 2026. Both players were named amongst the 17 players selected for Round 1.
- The following players were signed on a development contract for 2026:
  - Aliahana Fuimaono
  - Leteena Medland
  - Milahn Ieremia
  - Olivia Va'alele
- Evelyn Roberts played for Canterbury in the Lisa Fiaola Cup (Under 17) competition in 2024 and 2025 and Tarsha Gale Cup (Under 19) competition in early 2026. Roberts played for the Brisbane Tigers in the open-age BMD Premiership in 2025 and won the Steph Hancock Medal for the competition's best and fairest player.
- Mary-Jane Taito played for Canterbury in the Tarsha Gale Cup (Under 19) competition in 2025 and early 2026.
- The following players were signed on a development contract for 2025:
  - Waimarie Martin (Canterbury Bulldogs, U19 and Opens in 2024)
  - Leilani Wilson (Wentworthville Magpies, Opens in 2024)
  - Lahnayah Daniel Mahakitau-Monschau (Canterbury Bulldogs, U17 in 2024, U19 in 2025)
  - Simina Lokotui (Canterbury Bulldogs, U19 in 2025)

The Bulldogs announced player signings in several instalments from early February 2026. The Bulldogs announced contract extensions from May 2026.

=== Players extended ===
- Moana Courtenay (2027)
- Simina Lokotui (2027)

=== Players out ===
- Alexis Tauaneai to Dragons
- Angelina Teakaraanga-Katoa to Dragons

Off contract

- Ma’atuleio Fotu-Moala
- Kalosipani Hopoate
- Bridget Hoy
- Tamika Jones
- Elizabeth MacGregor
- Shaquaylah Mahakitau-Monschau
- Waimarie Martin
- Hope Millard
- Daynah Nankivell
- Ebony Prior
- Ashleigh Quinlan
- Evelyn Roberts
- Andie Robinson
- Latisha Smythe
- Giovanna Suani (Rpl)
- Pauline Suli-Ruka
- Monica Tagoai
- Mary-Jane Taito
- Paea Uilou
- Leilani Wilson (Sup)

==== Off contract after 2027 ====
- Moana Courtenay
- Simina Lokotui
- Evah McEwen

== Individual awards ==
The Canterbury-Bankstown Bulldogs club award winners since 2025.

Year	Player of the Year	Player's Player	Member's Award	Coach's Award	Rookie	Community	Ref
2025	Andie Robinson	Ashleigh Quinlan	Tayla Preston	Angelina Teakaraanga-Katoa	Moana Courtenay	—	
2026	Alexis Tauaneai	Alexis Tauaneai	Tayla Preston	Hope Millard	Leilani Wilson	Olivia Va'alele	

== Club records ==
Win-loss record since entering the NRLW in 2025.

Games	Wins	Drawn	Loss	Points for	Points against	+/-	Win %
22	6	1	15	336	684	–348	29.55%

=== Player records ===
Lists and tables last updated: 11 September 2026.

==== Career records (at the Bulldogs) ====
===== Most games for the Bulldogs =====
Qualification: 10 games

Rank	Player	Span	Games
1	Andie Robinson	2025–present	22
1	Tayla Preston	2025–present	22
3	Angelina Teakaraanga-Katoa	2025–present	21
4	Alexis Tauaneai	2025–present	19
4	Ashleigh Quinlan	2025–present	19
4	Kalosipani Hopoate	2025–present	19
7	Monica Tagoai	2025–present	18
8	Elizabeth MacGregor	2025–present	17
8	Hope Millard	2025–present	17
8	Simina Lokotui	2025–present	17
11	Latisha Smythe	2025–present	16
12	Ebony Prior	2025–present	13
13	Moana Courtenay	2025–present	12
14	Shaniece Monschau	2025	11
15	Shannon Muru	2025	10

===== Most points for the Bulldogs =====
Qualification: 12 points

Rank	Player	2026 club	M	T	G	FG	Points
1	Tayla Preston		22	1	38	0	80
2	Monica Tagoai		18	12	0	0	48
3	Elizabeth MacGregor		17	10	0	0	40
3	Simina Lokotui		17	10	0	0	40
5	Andie Robinson		22	6	0	0	24
6	Alexis Tauaneai		19	5	0	0	20
7	Ashleigh Quinlan		19	3	0	0	12
7	Moana Courtenay		12	3	0	0	12

===== Most tries for the Bulldogs =====
Qualification: 3 tries

Rank	Player	Tries
1	Monica Tagoai	12
2	Elizabeth MacGregor	10
2	Simina Lokotui	10
4	Andie Robinson	6
5	Alexis Tauaneai	5
6	Ashleigh Quinlan	3
6	Moana Courtenay	3

===== Most goals for the Bulldogs =====
All goal kickers

Rank	Player	Goals
1	Tayla Preston	38

===== Most field goals for the Bulldogs =====
No instances to date

==== Season records ====
===== Most points in a season for the Bulldogs =====
Qualification: 12 points

Rank	Player	Season	M	T	G	FG	Points
1	Tayla Preston	2025	11	1	21	0	46
2	Simina Lokotui	2026	10	9	0	0	36
2	Monica Tagoai	2026	10	9	0	0	36
4	Tayla Preston	2026	11	0	17	0	34
5	Elizabeth MacGregor	2025	8	7	0	0	28
6	Moana Courtenay	2025	10	3	0	0	12
6	Elizabeth MacGregor	2025	8	3	0	0	12
6	Ashleigh Quinlan	2025	10	3	0	0	12
6	Andie Robinson	2025	11	3	0	0	12
6	Monica Tagoai	2025	8	3	0	0	12
6	Alexis Tauaneai	2025	8	3	0	0	12
6	Elizabeth MacGregor	2026	9	3	0	0	12

===== Most tries in a season for the Bulldogs =====
Qualification: 3 tries

Rank	Player	Season	M	Tries
1	Simina Lokotui	2026	10	9
1	Monica Tagoai	2026	10	9
3	Elizabeth MacGregor	2025	8	7
4	Moana Courtenay	2025	10	3
4	Ashleigh Quinlan	2025	10	3
4	Andie Robinson	2025	11	3
4	Monica Tagoai	2025	8	3
4	Alexis Tauaneai	2025	8	3
4	Elizabeth MacGregor	2026	9	3
4	Andie Robinson	2026	11	3

==== Match records ====
===== Most points in a game for the Bulldogs =====
Qualification: 8 points

Rank	Player	Date	Opponent	Venue	T	G	FG	Points
1	Tayla Preston	6 Sep 2025	Sharks	Accor Stadium	1	4	0	12
1	Simina Lokotui	18 Jul 2026	Sharks	Accor Stadium	3	0	0	12
3	Moana Courtenay	4 Jul 2025	Knights	Accor Stadium	2	0	0	8
3	Ashleigh Quinlan	4 Jul 2025	Knights	Accor Stadium	2	0	0	8
3	Elizabeth MacGregor	26 Jul 2025	Roosters	Allianz Stadium	2	0	0	8
3	Elizabeth MacGregor	2 Aug 2025	Titans	McDonald Jones Stadium	2	0	0	8
3	Alexis Tauaneai	23 Aug 2025	Raiders	Belmore Sports Ground	2	0	0	8
3	Tayla Preston	23 Aug 2025	Raiders	Belmore Sports Ground	0	4	0	8
3	Elizabeth MacGregor	12 Sep 2025	Eels	CommBank Stadium	2	0	0	8
3	Tayla Preston	25 Jul 2026	Dragons	Accor Stadium	0	4	0	8
3	Simina Lokotui	8 Aug 2026	Cowboys	Belmore Sports Ground	2	0	0	8
3	Elizabeth MacGregor	8 Aug 2026	Cowboys	Belmore Sports Ground	2	0	0	8

===== Most tries in a game for the Bulldogs =====
Qualification: 2 tries

Rank	Player	Date	Opponent	Venue	Tries
1	Simina Lokotui	18 Jul 2026	Sharks	Accor Stadium	3
2	Moana Courtenay	4 Jul 2025	Knights	Accor Stadium	2
2	Ashleigh Quinlan	4 Jul 2025	Knights	Accor Stadium	2
2	Elizabeth MacGregor	26 Jul 2025	Roosters	Allianz Stadium	2
2	Elizabeth MacGregor	2 Aug 2025	Titans	McDonald Jones Stadium	2
2	Alexis Tauaneai	23 Aug 2025	Raiders	Belmore Sports Ground	2
2	Elizabeth MacGregor	12 Sep 2025	Eels	CommBank Stadium	2
2	Simina Lokotui	8 Aug 2026	Cowboys	Belmore Sports Ground	2
2	Elizabeth MacGregor	8 Aug 2026	Cowboys	Belmore Sports Ground	2
2	Monica Tagoai	5 Sep 2026	Knights	McDonald Jones Stadium	2

===== Most goals in a game for the Bulldogs =====
Qualification: 4 goals

Rank	Player	Date	Opponent	Venue	Goals
1	Tayla Preston	23 Aug 2025	Raiders	Belmore Sports Ground	4
1	Tayla Preston	6 Sep 2025	Sharks	Accor Stadium	4
1	Tayla Preston	25 Jul 2026	Dragons	Accor Stadium	4

==== Oldest and youngest players ====
The oldest and youngest players to represent the Canterbury-Bankstown Bulldogs women's NRLW team.

Name	Age	Year
Holli Wheeler	35 and 227 days	2025
Elizabeth MacGregor	18 and 284 days	2025

==== First try and last try ====
Player who scored the first try and most recent try for the Bulldogs.

Name	Year	Round	Minute	Opponent
Moana Courtenay	2025	1	29'	Knights
Andie Robinson	2026	11	31'	Roosters

=== Margins and streaks ===
Biggest winning margins
Qualification: 10 point margin

Margin	Score	Opponent	Venue	Date	Round
20	28–8	Dragons	Accor Stadium	25 Jul 2026	4
14	26–12	Knights	Accor Stadium	4 July 2025	1
10	24–14	Sharks	Accor Stadium	6 Sep 2025	10

Biggest losing margins
Qualification: 20 point margin

Margin	Score	Opponent	Venue	Date	Round
44	0–44	Broncos	Totally Workwear Stadium	31 Aug 2025	9
44	4–48	Raiders	Belmore Sports Ground	22 Aug 2026	8
34	22–56	Knights	McDonald Jones Stadium	5 Sep 2026	10
32	24–56	Raiders	Belmore Sports Ground	23 Aug 2025	8
32	14–46	Eels	CommBank Stadium	12 Sep 2025	11
30	4–34	Broncos	Geohex Park, Wagga Wagga	2 Aug 2026	5
30	14–44	Tigers	Campbelltown Stadium	30 Aug 2026	9
30	12–42	Sydney Roosters	Allianz Stadium	10 Sep 2026	11
28	6–34	Warriors	Accor Stadium	9 Aug 2025	6
26	10–36	Titans	Accor Stadium	11 Jul 2026	2
22	10–32	Warriors	FMG Stadium Waikato	5 Jul 2026	1
20	22–42	Sydney Roosters	Allianz Stadium	26 Jul 2025	4

Most consecutive wins

- 2 (4 July 2025 — 10 July 2025)
- 2 (18 July 2026 — 25 July 2026)

Most consecutive losses

- 5 (15 August 2026 — 10 September 2026) (current)
- 4 (9 August 2025 — 31 August 2025)

Biggest comeback

- Recovered from 6 point deficit.
  - Trailed Newcastle Knights 6-0 after 29 minutes at Accor Stadium on July 4 2025 and won 26-12.
  - Trailed North Queensland Cowboys 6-0 after 17 minutes at Belmore on August 8 2026 and won 28-26.

Worst collapse

- Surrendered 4 point lead. Led Parramatta Eels 8-4 after 25 minutes at CommBank Stadium on September 12 2025 and lost 14-46.

== History ==
The club’s entry into the NRLW for the 2025 season was confirmed by an NRL announcement on 28 March 2024. The Bulldogs were named as one of two additional clubs for the 2025 season, along with the re-entry of the New Zealand Warriors.

On 30 May 2024, the Bulldogs announced the appointment of Blake Cavallaro as their NRLW coach for their entry into the competition in 2025. As part of preparations for 2025, he was appointed to coach the Bulldogs team in the 2024 season of the NSWRL Women's Premiership. Cavallaro resigned in January 2025.

On 7 April 2025 Brayden Wiliame was announced as head-coach.

First game and first win

Result	Score	Opponent	Venue	Date	Ref
Won	26–12	Newcastle Knights	Accor Stadium	4 Jul 2025	

=== First team ===
The first ever Canterbury-Bankstown Bulldogs played the Newcastle Knights on 4 July 2025 at Accor Stadium. The Bulldogs won the match 26-12.

Jersey	Position	Player
1	Fullback	Andie Robinson
2	Wing	Bridget Hoy
3	Centre	Simina Lokotui
4	Centre	Moana Courtenay
5	Wing	Adi Vani Buleki
6	Five-eighth	Ashleigh Quinlan
7	Halfback	Tayla Preston (c)
8	Prop	Angelina Teakaaranga-Katoa (c)
14	Hooker	Shaquaylah Mahakitau-Monschau
10	Prop	Tegan Dymock
11	Second-row	Alexis Tauaneai
12	Second-row	Latisha Smythe
13	Lock	Holli Wheeler
9	Hooker	Ebony Prior
15	Prop	Shaniece Monschau
16	Second-row	Shannon Muru
17	Prop	Kalosipani Hopoate
	Coach	Brayden Wiliame

== Representative honours ==
=== National team representatives ===
Player	Club debut	Country	International debut	Years	Ref
Moana Courtenay	4 Jul 2025	Tonga	25 Oct 2025	2025	
Kalosipani Hopoate	4 Jul 2025	Tonga	**25 Jun 2022**	2025	
Simina Lokotui	4 Jul 2025	Tonga	25 Oct 2025	2025	
Shaniece Monschau	4 Jul 2025	New Zealand	2 Nov 2025	2025	
Shannon Muru	4 Jul 2025	Tonga	**25 Jun 2022**	2025	
Ashleigh Quinlan	4 Jul 2025	New Zealand	**14 Oct 2023**	2025	
Latisha Smythe	4 Jul 2025	Fiji	**26 Oct 2024**	2025	
Pauline Suli-Ruka	2 Aug 2025	Tonga	25 Oct 2025	2025	
Alexis Tauaneai	4 Jul 2025	New Zealand	**27 Oct 2024**	2025	
Angelina Teakaraanga-Katoa	4 Jul 2025	New Zealand	**14 Oct 2023**	2025	
Paea Uilou	19 Jul 2025	Tonga	**19 Oct 2024**	2025	

Notes:

- International Debut dates in **bold** indicate that the player made her first international appearance prior to playing for the Canterbury Bulldogs NRLW team.

==== Māori All Stars (Māori people) ====
Player	Year(s)
Ashleigh Quinlan	2023–2025

=== Prime Minister's XIII representatives ===
Past and current players who have been selected to play in the Prime Minister's XIII.

Player	Year(s)
Andie Robinson	2025

== Feeder team seasons ==
The Canterbury-Bankstown Bulldogs run women's pathways teams in the NSWRL Women's Premiership, the Tarsha Gale Cup, and the Lisa Fiaola Cup.

=== NSWRL Women's Premiership ===
Season	Regular season									Finals		Ref
Season	P	W	D	L	B	F	A	Pts	Pos	Top	Placing	Ref
2018	12	5	1	5	6	234	210	15	7th	5	—	
2019	7	1	0	6	7	68	144	16	9th	8	—	
2020	6	2	1	3	1	60	88	7	5th	6	Elimination Finalist	
2021	Did not enter									6	—	
2022	Did not enter									4	—	
2023	10	7	0	3	1	212	177	16	3rd	4	Grand Finalist	
2024	11	6	0	5	0	214	214	12	5th	4	—	
2025	11	5	0	6	0	192	206	10	7th	4	—	
2026	11	0	0	11	0	158	358	0	12th	5	—	

=== Tarsha Gale Cup ===
For Under 18 players from 2017 to 2020. Since 2021, the Cup is for Under 19 players.

Season	Regular season									Finals		Ref
Season	P	W	D	L	B	F	A	Pts	Pos	Top	Placing	Ref
2017	7	6	1	0	1	237	78	14	1st	8	Grand Finalist	
2018	9	1	0	8	0	158	444	2	11th	8	—	
2019	9	0	0	9	0	58	382	0	10th	8	—	
2020	5	2	0	3	0	88	88	4	6th	8	—	
2021	8	1	0	7	1	96	208	4	9th	6	—	
2022	8	2	2	4	1	98	140	8	7th	6	—	
2023	8	8	0	0	1	284	52	18	1st	6	Grand Finalist	
2024	8	7	0	1	1	298	50	16	2nd	6	Semi-Finalist	
2025	8	6	1	1	1	240	97	15	2nd	8	Preliminary Finalist	
2026	8	6	0	2	1	264	112	14	3rd	8	Semi-Finalist	

=== Lisa Fiaola Cup ===
For Under 17 players.

Season	Regular season									Finals		Ref
Season	P	W	D	L	B	F	A	Pts	Pos	Top	Placing	Ref
2024	8	8	0	0	1	468	48	18	1st	6	Premiers	
2025	8	7	1	1	1	401	36	17	1st	8	Preliminary Finalist	
2026	8	7	0	1	1	290	66	16	3rd	8	Premiers	

== Inaugural season signings ==
From 19 July 2024 the Bulldogs began to announce player signings for the 2025 NRLW season.

Player	Position(s)	Announcement date	2024 club	Ref
Tayla Preston	Halfback, Five-eighth	19 Jul 2024	Cronulla Sharks	
Ashleigh Quinlan	Five-eighth, Halfback	19 July 2024	Canberra Raiders	
Ebony Prior	Hooker	20 Jul 2024	Wests Tigers	
Andie Robinson	Wing, Centre	24 Jul 2024	Cronulla Sharks	
Pauline Suli-Ruka	Lock	24 Jul 2024	Canterbury Bulldogs (U19)	
Tegan Dymock	Prop, Lock	2 Sep 2024	Cronulla Sharks	
Kalosipani Hopoate	Prop	2 Sep 2024	Sydney Roosters	
Alexis Tauaneai	Lock, Prop	2 Sep 2024	St George Illawarra Dragons	
Angelina Teakaraanga-Katoa	Prop	2 Sep 2024	St George Illawarra Dragons	
Holli Wheeler	Prop, Lock	2 Sep 2024	Cronulla Sharks	
Latisha Smythe	Second-row	9 Sep 2024	Canterbury Bulldogs (HNWP)	
Sarahcen Oliver	Centre	17 Sep 2024	Canterbury Bulldogs (HNWP)	
Elizabeth MacGregor	Fullback, Wing	19 Sep 2024	Sydney Roosters (U19)	
Shannon Muru	Second-row	30 Sep 2024	Canterbury Bulldogs (HNWP)	
Paea Uilou	Prop	30 Sep 2024	Canterbury Bulldogs (U19 & HNWP)	
Hope Millard	Lock	19 Sep 2024	Illawarra Steelers (U19 & HNWP)	
Shaniece Monschau	Second-row, Prop	7 Nov 2024	Canterbury Bulldogs (Open)	
Shaquaylah Mahakitau-Monschau	Hooker, Five-eighth	7 Nov 2024	Canterbury Bulldogs (U19 & Open)	
Maatuleio Fotu-Moala	Prop	12 Nov 2024	St George Illawarra Dragons	
Anneka Wilson	Halfback	26 Nov 2024	Wentworthville (HNWP)	
Leilani Wilson	Prop	26 Nov 2024	Wentworthville (HNWP)	
Moana Courtenay	Centre	18 Dec 2024	North Harbour (Union)	
Adi Vani Buleki	Wing	12 May 2025	Western Force	
Monica Tagoai		12 May 2025	Hurricanes Poua (Union 2025)	
