= Monica Tagoai =

NZ international rugby union & Samoa international rugby league player (born 1998)

- Born: 17 October 1998 (age 28) Apia, Samoa
- Height: 1.70 m (5 ft 7 in)
- Weight: 82 kg (12 st 13 lb)

Rugby union career
- Position(s): Wing, Centre
Provincial / State sides
Years	Team	Apps	(Points)
2016–24	Wellington	45	(75)
Super Rugby
Years	Team	Apps	(Points)
2022–24	Hurricanes Poua	18	(30)
International career
Years	Team	Apps	(Points)
2018–24	New Zealand	4	(0)
- Rugby league career

Playing information
- Position: Centre
Club
Years	Team	Pld	T	G	FG	P
2025–	Canterbury-Bankstown Bulldogs	8	3	0	0	12
Representative
Years	Team	Pld	T	G	FG	P
2025–	Samoa	4	1	0	0	4
- As of 18 November 2026

Monica Tagoai (born 17 October 1998) is a New Zealand rugby union and rugby league player who currently plays at centre for the Canterbury-Bankstown Bulldogs in the NRLW and Samoa.

She played three tests for the Black Ferns in 2018. She has previously played for the Hurricanes Poua in the Super Rugby Aupiki competition and represented Wellington provincially.

== Background ==
Originally from Samoa, Tagoai migrated with her family to New Zealand when she was three, and attended St Mary's College.

== Rugby career ==
=== 2016–18 ===
Tagoai debuted for Wellington against Waikato in 2016. She has made 22 appearances for Wellington since 2016.

Tagoai made her Black Ferns debut in their 67–6 thrashing of the United States at Soldier Field in 2018. She earned her second cap in Black Ferns 27–30 loss to France at Grenoble.

=== 2021 ===
In 2021 Tagoai joined Hurricanes Poua for the inaugural 2022 season of Super Rugby Aupiki. She featured in both their games against Chiefs Manawa and Matatū.

=== Canterbury-Bankstown Bulldogs ===
She joined Canterbury-Bankstown Bulldogs to play in the NRLW for the 2025 season

=== Representative ===
She made her Samoa début in the 2026 Rugby League World Cup 40-0 defeat to Australia on 16 October 2026.
